= Manuela Henkel =

German cross-country skier

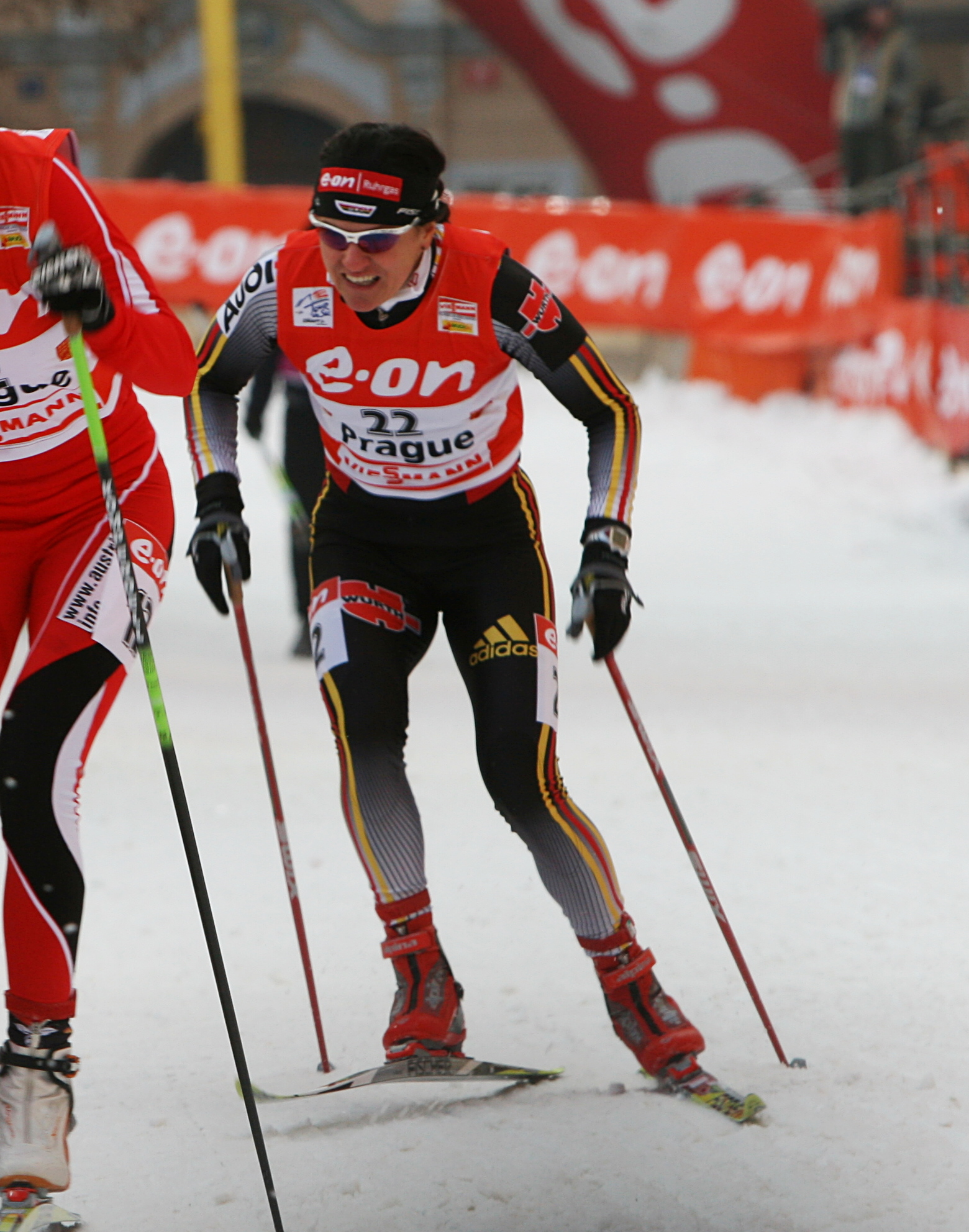
- Henkel in the 2007–08 Tour de Ski

Personal information
- Nationality: Germany
- Born: 4 December 1974 (age 51) Neuhaus am Rennweg, Bezirk Suhl, East Germany

Sport
- Sport: Skiing
- Club: WSV Oberhof 05

World Cup career
- Seasons: 16 – (1995–2010)
- Indiv. starts: 199
- Indiv. podiums: 8
- Indiv. wins: 0
- Team starts: 47
- Team podiums: 16
- Team wins: 2
- Overall titles: 0 – (12th in 2003)
- Discipline titles: 0
Medal record
Women's cross-country skiing
Representing Germany
Olympic Games
Gold medal – first place	2002 Salt Lake City	4 × 5 km relay
World Championships
Gold medal – first place	2003 Val di Fiemme	4 × 5 km relay

Manuela Henkel (born 4 December 1974) is a German cross-country skier who has competed since 1994. She won a gold medal in the 4 × 5 km relay at the 2002 Winter Olympics in Salt Lake City. Her best individual finish was 12th in the Individual sprint at the 2006 Winter Olympics in Turin. She is the older sister of Andrea Henkel, a biathlete.

Henkel also won a gold in the 4 × 5 km relay at the 2003 FIS Nordic World Ski Championships and earned her best individual finish of 9th in the 15 km event at those same games. She has won three individual races in her career, all under 5 km in 1995, 2000, and 2005.

Henkel's local ski club is the WSV Oberhof.

== Cross-country skiing results ==
All results are sourced from the International Ski Federation (FIS).

=== Olympic Games ===
- 1 medal – (1 gold)

Year	Age	5 km	10 km	15 km	Pursuit	30 km	Sprint	4 × 5 km relay	Team sprint
1998	23	—	—N/a	36	—	DNF	—N/a	5	—N/a
2002	27	—N/a	18	—	20	DNF	15	Gold	—N/a
2006	31	—N/a	—	—N/a	52	—	12	—	—

=== World Championships ===
- 1 medal – (1 gold)

Year	Age	5 km	10 km	15 km	Pursuit	30 km	Sprint	4 × 5 km relay	Team sprint
1995	20	—	—N/a	20	—	—	—N/a	5	—N/a
1997	22	30	—N/a	—	44	40	—N/a	6	—N/a
1999	24	—	—N/a	29	—	22	—N/a	—	—N/a
2001	26	—N/a	—	—	14	CNX^{[a]}	10	4	—N/a
2003	28	—N/a	—	18	9	—	11	Gold	—N/a
2005	30	—N/a	—	—N/a	—	DNS	11	—	—
2007	32	—N/a	—	—N/a	—	—	9	—	—
2009	34	—N/a	—	—N/a	—	—	24	—	—

a. ^{1} Cancelled due to extremely cold weather.

=== World Cup ===
==== Season standings ====
Season	Age	Discipline standings					Ski Tour standings	
Season	Age	Overall	Distance	Long Distance	Middle Distance	Sprint	Tour de Ski	World Cup Final
1995	21	39	—N/a	—N/a	—N/a	—N/a	—N/a	—N/a
1996	22	37	—N/a	—N/a	—N/a	—N/a	—N/a	—N/a
1997	23	35	—N/a	43	—N/a	23	—N/a	—N/a
1998	24	58	—N/a	NC	—N/a	51	—N/a	—N/a
1999	25	28	—N/a	37	—N/a	17	—N/a	—N/a
2000	26	26	—N/a	—	31	11	—N/a	—N/a
2001	27	19	—N/a	—N/a	—N/a	3rd place, bronze medalist(s)	—N/a	—N/a
2002	28	18	—N/a	—N/a	—N/a	6	—N/a	—N/a
2003	29	12	—N/a	—N/a	—N/a	4	—N/a	—N/a
2004	30	18	26	—N/a	—N/a	9	—N/a	—N/a
2005	31	40	61	—N/a	—N/a	21	—N/a	—N/a
2006	32	21	62	—N/a	—N/a	5	—N/a	—N/a
2007	33	33	NC	—N/a	—N/a	16	44	—N/a
2008	34	35	43	—N/a	—N/a	27	DNF	—
2009	35	51	84	—N/a	—N/a	34	DNF	50
2010	36	NC	NC	—N/a	—N/a	NC	DNF	—

==== Individual podiums ====
- 8 podiums – (8 WC)

No.	Season	Date	Location	Race	Level	Place
1	2000–01	21 January 2001	Soldier Hollow, United States	1.5 km Sprint F	World Cup	2nd
2	2001–02	13 March 2002	Oslo, Norway	1.5 km Sprint C	World Cup	3rd
3	2001–02	23 March 2002	Lillehammer, Norway	58 km Mass Start C	World Cup	3rd
4	2002–03	6 March 2003	Oslo, Norway	1.5 km Sprint C	World Cup	2nd
5	2002–03	11 March 2003	Drammen, Norway	1.5 km Sprint C	World Cup	2nd
6	2003–04	16 December 2003	Val di Fiemme, Italy	1.2 km Sprint C	World Cup	3rd
7	2003–04	25 January 2004	Val di Fiemme, Italy	70 km Mass Start C	World Cup	3rd
8	2005–06	8 January 2006	Otepää, Estonia	1.0 km Sprint C	World Cup	2nd

==== Team podiums ====
- 2 victories – (2 RL)
- 16 podiums – (13 RL, 3 TS)

No.	Season	Date	Location	Race	Level	Place	Teammate(s)
1	2001–02	10 March 2002	Falun, Sweden	4 × 5 km Relay C/F	World Cup	3rd	Bauer / Künzel / Sachenbacher
2	2002–03	24 November 2002	Kiruna, Sweden	4 × 5 km Relay C/F	World Cup	2nd	Bauer / Künzel / Sachenbacher
3	2002–03	8 December 2002	Davos, Switzerland	4 × 5 km Relay C/F	World Cup	3rd	Bauer / Sachenbacher / Künzel
4	2002–03	19 January 2003	Nové Město, Czech Republic	4 × 5 km Relay C/F	World Cup	1st	Bauer / Künzel / Sachenbacher
5	2002–03	26 January 2003	Oberhof, Germany	6 × 1.5 km Team Sprint F	World Cup	2nd	Künzel
6	2002–03	23 March 2003	Falun, Sweden	4 × 5 km Relay C/F	World Cup	1st	Bauer / Künzel / Sachenbacher
7	2003–04	23 November 2003	Beitostølen, Norway	4 × 5 km Relay C/F	World Cup	2nd	Böhler / Sachenbacher / Künzel
8	2003–04	14 December 2003	Davos, Switzerland	4 × 5 km Relay C/F	World Cup	2nd	Böhler / Sachenbacher / Künzel
9	2003–04	11 January 2004	Otepää, Estonia	4 × 5 km Relay C/F	World Cup	2nd	Bauer / Sachenbacher / Künzel
10	2003–04	7 February 2004	La Clusaz, France	4 × 5 km Relay C/F	World Cup	2nd	Bauer / Reschwam Schulze / Künzel
11	2003–04	15 February 2004	Oberstdorf, Germany	6 × 0.8 km Team Sprint F	World Cup	3rd	Klaus
12	2004–05	24 October 2004	Düsseldorf, Germany	6 × 0.8 km Team Sprint F	World Cup	2nd	Sachenbacher
13	2004–05	12 December 2004	Lago di Tesero, Italy	4 × 5 km Relay C/F	World Cup	2nd	Künzel / Böhler / Sachenbacher
14	2005–06	20 November 2005	Beitostølen, Norway	4 × 5 km Relay C/F	World Cup	2nd	Böhler / Künzel-Nystad / Sachenbacher-Stehle
15	2006–07	19 November 2006	Gällivare, Sweden	4 × 5 km Relay C/F	World Cup	2nd	Zeller / Sachenbacher-Stehle / Künzel-Nystad
16	2007–08	9 December 2007	Davos, Switzerland	4 × 5 km Relay C/F	World Cup	2nd	Zeller / Sachenbacher-Stehle / Böhler
