= Miriam Neureuther =

German biathlete and cross-country skier

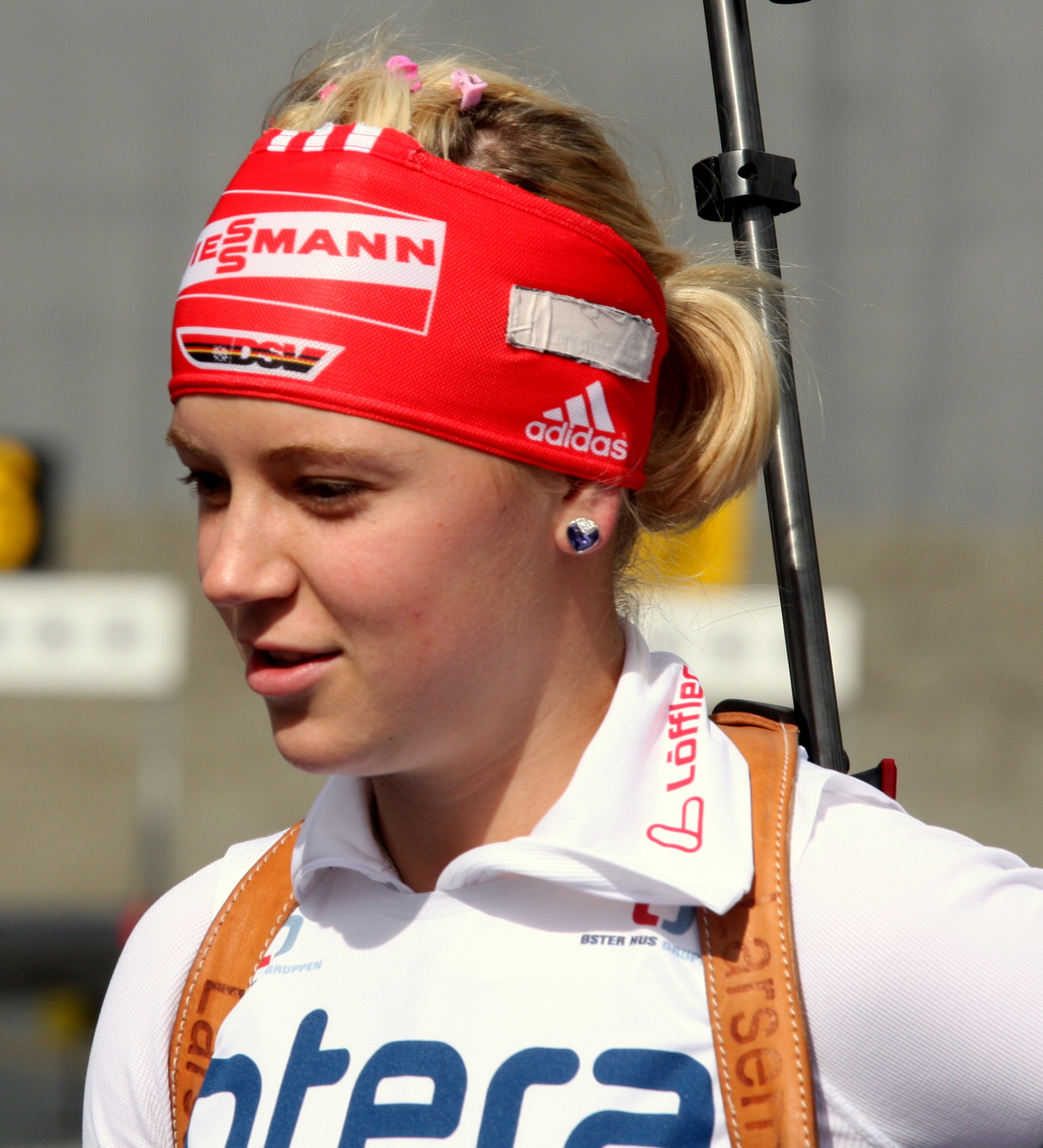
- Gössner in Norway in 2009

Personal information
- Born: Miriam Gössner; 21 June 1990 (age 36) Garmisch-Partenkirchen, West Germany
- Height: 1.67 m (5 ft 6 in)
- Weight: 57 kg (126 lb)
- Website: miriamgoessner.com

Sport

Professional information
- Sport: Biathlon; Cross-country skiing
- Club: Ski Club Garmisch
- Skis: Fischer
- Rifle: Anschütz
- World Cup debut: 2 December 2009; 7 March 2009

Olympic Games
- Teams: 0; 1 (2010)
- Medals: 0; 1 (0 gold)

World Championships
- Teams: 3 (2011, 2012, 2013); 2 (2009, 2013)
- Medals: 2 (2 gold); 1 (0 gold)

World Cup
- Seasons: 6 (2009/10–)
- Individual victories: 3
- All victories: 7
- Individual podiums: 10
- All podiums: 18
Medal record
Representing Germany
Women's biathlon
World Championships
Gold medal – first place	2011 Khanty-Mansiysk	4 × 6 km relay
Gold medal – first place	2012 Ruhpolding	4 × 6 km relay
Junior World Championships
Gold medal – first place	2008 Ruhpolding	3 × 6 km relay
Gold medal – first place	2009 Canmore	10 km pursuit
Silver medal – second place	2009 Canmore	7.5 km sprint
Bronze medal – third place	2009 Canmore	3 × 6 km relay
Women's cross-country skiing
Olympic Games
Silver medal – second place	2010 Vancouver	4 × 5 km relay
World Championships
Silver medal – second place	2009 Liberec	4 × 5 km relay
- Updated on 18 January 2017

Miriam Neureuther (née Gössner; born 21 June 1990) is a former German biathlete and cross-country skier. She has won an Olympic silver medal in cross-country skiing and two biathlon world championship titles, all in team events. Noted for her fast skiing performances, she won two junior world championship titles in biathlon in 2008 and 2009. Gössner was called up for the Nordic World Ski Championships 2009, where she was part of Germany's cross-country team claiming silver in the 4 × 5 kilometre relay.

At the 2010 Winter Olympics in Vancouver, Gössner won a silver medal in cross-country skiing in the 4 × 5 kilometre relay. She returned to biathlon for the 2010–11 season, achieving three podium finishes in her first complete winter on the Biathlon World Cup tour. At the Biathlon World Championships 2011, Gössner won the gold medal in the women's relay. The following year she defended the world championship title with the German team in the 2012 women's relay. Gössner claimed her first individual World Cup win in December 2012.

== Personal life ==
Miriam Gössner was born in the German alpine resort town of Garmisch-Partenkirchen, Bavaria. Her father is German and her mother Norwegian, born in Molde, Norway. Gössner grew up bilingually and is fluent in Norwegian. She originally hoped for a career in alpine skiing, but following an accident during slalom training, in which she lost several teeth and suffered a broken cheekbone, she instead started biathlon at the age of 14. Until 2011, she had been involved in a four-year relationship with German biathlete Simon Schempp. Since 2013 she has been in a relationship with German alpine skier Felix Neureuther: in October 2017 she gave birth to the couple's first child, a girl named Matilda. She married Felix Neureuther in December 2017.

In February 2014 Gössner posed nude for, and appeared on the cover of, the German edition of Playboy.

== Career ==
=== Early career ===
After deciding to pursue a career in biathlon, Gössner joined the German Customs Administration in August 2006 to become a member in the government-supported Customs-Ski-Team (Zoll-Ski-Team). She officially holds the rank of Zollhauptwachtmeisterin (head customs officer), although she is a full-time professional athlete with no customs obligations. For several years Gössner trained alongside retired Olympic champion Magdalena Neuner in Mittenwald, one of Germany's biathlon bases. Her local coach is Bernhard Kröll.

Gössner qualified for the 2008 Biathlon Junior/Youth World Championships in Ruhpolding, Germany, where she won gold as part of the German relay team. One year later at the 2009 Biathlon Junior/Youth World Championships in Canmore, Alberta, Canada, Gössner won the pursuit title. She also won silver in the sprint, bronze in the relay, and came in fourth place in the individual. Early on, Gössner was noted for her fast skiing performances. She won the junior pursuit gold in spite of eight shooting errors and came in fourth in the individual with a total time penalty of six minutes.

Because of her fast skiing times, Germany's cross-country coach, Jochen Behle, called her up as a late replacement for the freestyle sprint at the FIS Nordic World Ski Championships 2009 in Liberec, Czech Republic. She came in 17th place during qualification, but did not advance beyond the quarter-final in the main competition, eventually finishing in 19th position. After Stefanie Böhler had to withdraw, Gössner was picked for the 4 × 5 kilometre relay. She set the fastest time of all racers on her lap and reduced Germany's gap to the lead by 55.1 seconds, playing an important part in Germany's silver medal win. Gössner could not compete in biathlon for the remainder of the season due to a thumb injury, therefore she debuted in the FIS Cross-Country World Cup in Lahti, Finland in March 2009, winning her first World Cup points with two top-30 finishes.

=== Olympic cross-country silver (2009–10 season) ===
Gössner made her debut in the Biathlon World Cup in Östersund, Sweden, in December 2009, the first event of the 2009–10 season. She finished in 73rd place in the individual and 58th in the sprint race, with seven and five shooting errors respectively. She saw no chance to qualify for the 2010 Winter Olympics in biathlon and concentrated on cross-country skiing for the remaining season. Gössner competed at the 2009–10 Tour de Ski, finishing in 5th place in the prologue, which secured her the Olympic qualification in cross-country skiing. She continued with good results in the cross-country World Cup, coming in 5th in the sprint and 4th in the team sprint in Rybinsk, Russia.

The Winter Olympics in Vancouver started with a setback for Gössner. She was looking for a potential top ten finish in the 10 kilometre freestyle race, before crashing on the second loop. She injured her shoulder and lost time, eventually finishing in 21st place. On 25 February 2010, running the third leg alongside Katrin Zeller, Evi Sachenbacher-Stehle and Claudia Nystad for Germany, Gössner claimed the silver medal in the 4 × 5 kilometre relay. After the Olympics, she remained with the cross-country team through the end of the season. Her best World Cup result was a second place in Lahti, again coming in a women's relay event. Along with all Olympic medal winners, she received the Silberne Lorbeerblatt (Silver Laurel Leaf), the highest state decoration for athletes in Germany.

=== Initial biathlon success (2010–11 season) ===
2010–11 World Cup season results
No.	World Cup location	Individual	Sprint	Pursuit	Mass Start	Relay	Mixed relay
1	Östersund, Sweden	39	2	2	–	–	–
2	Hochfilzen, Austria	–	18	25	–	DNS	–
3	Pokljuka, Slovenia	53	12	–	–	–	8
4	Oberhof, Germany	–	43	–	19	DNS	–
5	Ruhpolding, Germany	39	17	22		–	–
6	Antholz, Italy	–	17	–	28	3	–
7	Presque Isle, United States	–	21	29	–	–	DNS
8	Fort Kent, United States	–	2	10	14	–	–
WCH	Khanty-Mansiysk, Russia	DNS	9	7	14	1	DNS
9	Oslo, Norway	–	35	6	13	–	–
Key:"—" denotes discipline not held; DNS—Did not start; WCH—World Championships

Despite repeated attempts by head coach Jochen Behle to convince her to stay with the cross-country team, Gössner decided to return to biathlon for the 2010–11 season, even if she had to compete in second tier IBU Cup races initially. However, she was picked for the German team at the World Cup opening in Östersund. In the first race of the season, she finished in 39th place in the individual race, winning her first Biathlon World Cup points. Two days later, Gössner shot clean and came in second place in the sprint race. In the subsequent pursuit, she defended her second place. She set the fastest course time in both races and was beaten only by Finland's Kaisa Mäkäräinen.

Following her surprising podiums, Gössner continued the season with average results, earning World Cup points in 11 of her next 13 individual races. However, she failed to reach any more top ten positions because of poor shooting performances. In Pokljuka, Slovenia, Gössner competed in her first biathlon team event, a mixed relay race. She incurred four penalty loops in the standing shoot, with Germany finishing eighth eventually. One month later in Antholz, Italy, she reached third place in the women's relay with Germany, again skiing two penalty loops. At the World Cup stop in Fort Kent in the United States, Gössner claimed her third career podium, coming in second behind teammate Andrea Henkel in the sprint race.

In March 2011, Gössner made her first appearance at the Biathlon World Championships in Khanty-Mansiysk, Russia. She achieved good results, finishing in 9th place in the sprint, 7th in the pursuit and 14th in the mass start, and was consequently selected for the women's relay. Alongside Andrea Henkel, Tina Bachmann and Magdalena Neuner, Gössner ran the second leg for Germany, but again struggled with the standing shoot and had to ski two penalty loops. A strong finish by teammate Magdalena Neuner on the last leg, however, gave Gössner her first world championship gold medal and first World Cup win. Gössner ended her first complete biathlon season with three individual podiums and seven top ten finishes, ranked 14th in the overall World Cup standings.

=== Disappointing second season (2011–12 season) ===
2011–12 World Cup season results
No.	World Cup location	Individual	Sprint	Pursuit	Mass Start	Relay	Mixed relay
1	Östersund, Sweden	43	22	38	–	–	–
2	Hochfilzen, Austria	–	48	38	–	DNS	–
3	Hochfilzen, Austria	–	42	28	–	–	5
4	Oberhof, Germany	–	37	–	DNS	DNS	–
5	Nové Město, Czech Republic	58	37	11	–	–	–
6	Antholz, Italy	–	15	–	30	6	–
7	Oslo, Norway	–	15	19	20	–	–
8	Kontiolahti, Finland	–	6	20	–	–	5
WCH	Ruhpolding, Germany	36	37	22	DNS	1	DNS
9	Khanty-Mansiysk, Russia	–	16	25	29	–	–
Key:"—" denotes discipline not held; DNS—Did not start; WCH—World Championships

During the summer of 2011, Gössner had to undergo an emergency intestinal operation after being diagnosed with a volvulus. The 2011–12 World Cup season did not go as well as the previous winter. Gössner was struggling with her skiing speed and she only reached one individual top ten position during the entire season. A sixth place in the Kontiolahti sprint was her best position of the winter, shooting clean but not skiing fast enough for a podium finish. Four of her five best results during the 2011–12 season came in sprint events.

At the 2012 World Championships in Ruhpolding, Gössner managed to end the season with a good performance in front of her home fans. Despite mixed results, she was selected to run the third leg of Germany's women's relay, alongside Tina Bachmann, Magdalena Neuner and Andrea Henkel. She used three spare rounds and led the team from third to first position, playing a pivotal part in Germany's eventual relay victory.

=== First individual World Cup victory (2012–13 season) ===
2012–13 World Cup season results
No.	World Cup location	Individual	Sprint	Pursuit	Mass Start	Relay	Mixed relay
1	Östersund, Sweden	11	45	23	–	–	–
2	Hochfilzen, Austria	–	9	6	–	4	–
3	Pokljuka, Slovenia	–	2	1	2	–	8
4	Oberhof, Germany	–	1	10	–	3	–
5	Ruhpolding, Germany	–	1	–	8	4	–
6	Antholz, Italy	–	62	DNS	–	1	–
WCH	Nové Město, Czech Republic	35	6	21	6	5	13
7	Oslo, Norway	–	–	24	DNS	19	–
8	Sochi, Russia	35	13	–	–	1	–
9	Khanty-Mansiysk, Russia	–	3	5	29	–	–
Key:"—" denotes discipline not held; DNS—Did not start; WCH—World Championships

Gössner lost 10 kilograms during the summer, in an effort to regain her outstanding skiing pace. At the beginning of the 2012–13 season, she was once again able to set the fastest course times. At the third World Cup stop in Pokljuka, Slovenia, Gössner finished all three races on the podium. She missed her first individual victory by 2.0 seconds in the sprint, before claiming her maiden World Cup win in the following pursuit, despite a total of five penalty loops. She ended her weekend with another second place in the Pokljuka mass start.

After the Christmas break, Gössner claimed her second World Cup win in the Oberhof sprint race. She also came third with the German relay team in the Oberhof women's relay. One week later, she won her second sprint race in a row in Ruhpolding. At the last World Cup stage before the world championships, Gössner missed seven out of ten targets in the Antholz sprint, finishing in 62nd place. It was the second worst result of her career, which also meant she failed to qualify for the subsequent pursuit. However, two days later in the last event before the 2013 Biathlon World Championships she was part of Germany's winning relay team. At the Biathlon Worlds themselves, she failed to secure a medal, with her best finishes being a pair of sixth places in the sprint and the mass start. Subsequently, she also narrowly missed out on a medal at the 2013 Nordic Worlds in Val di Fiemme, her first cross-country appearance since the 2010 Olympics, where she finished fourth in the 10km freestyle, half a second behind bronze medallist Yuliya Chekalyova.

=== Injury, drop in form and focus on cross-country ===
Following her 2012–13 season, Gössner suffered a back injury in a cycling accident, which kept her out of the 2014 Winter Olympics in Sochi. The injury contributed to a loss of form in biathlon over the next few seasons. After taking time out of competition due to the birth of her daughter, in May 2018 she was named by the German Ski Association as a member of their third-tier cross-country ski team: earlier that year she had stated that if she would return to racing she would do so in cross-country, rather than biathlon, as she felt she was no longer able to shoot error-free.

== Personal health ==
Neureuther and Kim Bui hosted the German documentary movie Hungern für Gold (2023, Starving for gold). Both talked about their own eating disorders and interviewed other athletes like ski jumpers Sven Hannawald and Maren Lundby.

In 2024 Neureuther criticized FIS president Johan Eliasch for the schedules in professional winter sport. She also offered doubts about the current possibilities for female athletes with children to compete.

== Biathlon statistics ==
=== Skiing ===
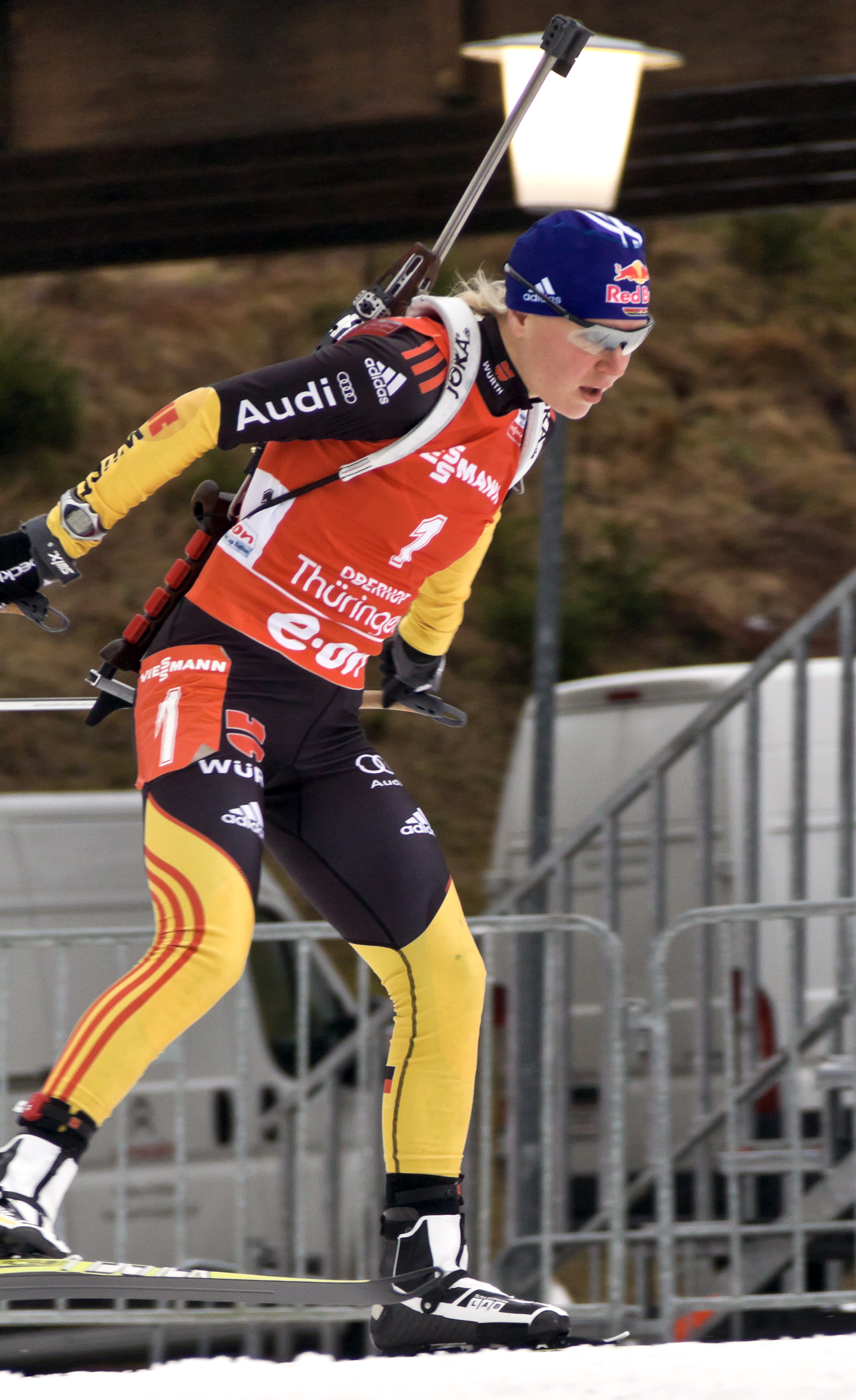
Gössner competing at a World Cup race in Oberhof, Germany

Gössner is known as one of the fastest cross-country skiers in biathlon. During 17 of her 75 World Cup races (23%), she has set the fastest course time (race time without time spent at the shooting range or in the penalty loop). In addition, she has been among the top three fastest skiers in 52% of her career races. At junior level, Gössner was noted for her fast skiing performances and she often had been able to make up for multiple shooting errors on the cross-country course. In her first two World Cup races in the 2009–10 season, she achieved the 9th and 15th fastest course time respectively. One year later during the 2010–11 season, Gössner set the fastest skiing time in 8 of her 25 races, out-skiing most of the field's top contenders on a regular basis. Her skiing performances dropped off considerably in 2011–12 season when she only managed one top three course time. During the 2012–13 season, Gössner returned to her fast ski speed, setting the best course time in nine consecutive races, a new record, beating Magdalena Neuner, who managed 8 consecutive races back in 2007–08 season.

Course times	2009–10 season		2010–11 season		2011–12 season		2012–13 season		2013–14 season		2014–15 season		2015–16 season		Career	
Fastest	0 / 2	0%	8 / 25	32%	0 / 24	0%	9 / 24	38%	0 / 4	0%	0 / 13	0%	3 / 21	14%	20 / 113	18%
2nd fastest	0 / 2	0%	6 / 25	24%	1 / 24	4%	6 / 24	25%	0 / 4	0%	0 / 13	0%	2 / 21	10%	15 / 113	13%
3rd fastest	0 / 2	0%	5 / 25	20%	0 / 24	0%	4 / 24	17%	0 / 4	0%	0 / 13	0%	1 / 21	5%	10 / 113	9%
4th-10th fastest	1 / 2	50%	5 / 25	20%	10 / 24	42%	2 / 24	8%	1 / 4	25%	3 / 13	23%	13 / 21	62%	35 / 113	31%
Other	1 / 2	50%	1 / 25	24%	13 / 24	54%	3 / 24	13%	3 / 4	75%	10 / 13	77%	2 / 21	10%	33 / 113	29%

Key: Number of respective times achieved / number of all races entered, percentage.

* Results in IBU World Cup races, no relay events. Statistics as of 17 March 2013, the end of the 2012–13 season.

=== Shooting ===
As of January 2013, Gössner has a career shooting accuracy of 70%. Her career average in the prone position is 76%, while her career average in the standing position is 64%. Her shooting results in the prone position are slightly below average, while her standing position percentage is among the worst of the entire World Cup field. In her three seasons on the World Cup tour, Gössner produced highly inconsistent shooting results. She shot clean twice (in her first podium finish in the 2010 Östersund sprint, as well as the 2012 Kontiolahti sprint), but also had three races with a total of nine shooting errors (2011 Antholz mass start, 2011 Presque Isle pursuit, 2012 Khanty-Mansiysk mass start). In the 2013 Oberhof pursuit she even had 10 errors, however finished 10th due to an outstanding skiing performance. When she claimed her first World Cup victory she skied five penalty loops (2012 Pokljuka pursuit).

Shooting	2009–10 season		2010–11 season		2011–12 season		2012–13 season		2013–14 season		2014–15 season		2015–16 season		2016–17 season		Career	
Prone position	11 / 15	73.3%	177 / 220	80.5%	161 / 215	74.9%	173 / 233	74.2%	14 / 25	56.0%	70 / 100	70.0%	143 / 189	75.7%	69 / 85	81.2%	818 / 1082	75.6%
Standing position	7 / 15	46.7%	123 / 224	54.9%	147 / 217	67.7%	167 / 241	69.3%	13 / 25	52.0%	62 / 102	60.8%	124 / 193	64.2%	44 / 85	51.8%	687 / 1102	62.3%
Total	18 / 30	60.0%	300 / 444	67.6%	308 / 432	71.3%	340 / 474	71.7%	27 / 50	54.0%	132 / 202	65.3%	267 / 382	69.9%	113 / 170	66.5%	1505 / 2184	68.9%

* Results in all IBU World Cup races, Olympics and World Championships including relay events and disqualified races. Statistics as of 15 January 2017.

== Biathlon results ==
=== Biathlon World Championships ===
Gössner made her debut at the Biathlon World Championships at the 2011 competition in Khanty-Mansiysk, Russia. Following top ten finishes in the sprint and pursuit races, she won her first world title in the women's relay, claiming the gold medal alongside Andrea Henkel, Tina Bachmann and Magdalena Neuner. One year later, Gössner successfully defended the women's relay gold medal with the same German team.

Event	Individual	Sprint	Pursuit	Mass Start	Relay	Mixed Relay
(Russia) 2011 Khanty-Mansiysk	—	9th	7th	14th	Gold	—
(Germany) 2012 Ruhpolding	36th	37th	22nd	—	Gold	—
(Czech Republic) 2013 Nové Město	35th	6th	21st	6th	5th	13th

=== Biathlon World Cup ===
Gössner made her debut in the Biathlon World Cup in the 2009–10 season. After two disappointing races at the beginning of the winter, she joined the German cross-country team. She had ten appearances on the FIS Cross-Country World Cup tour, including three top ten finishes in non-team races. The following winter, Gössner returned to biathlon for the 2010–11 season. In the overall standings she finished her first complete World Cup season in 14th place.

Season	Overall			Sprint			Pursuit			Individual			Mass Start		
Season	Races	Points^{[a]}	Position	Races	Points	Position	Races	Points	Position	Races	Points	Position	Races	Points	Position
2009–10	2/25	0	—N/a	1/10	0	—N/a	0/6	0	—N/a	1/4	0	—N/a	0/5	0	—N/a
2010–11	25/26	593	14th	10/10	266	9th	7/7	206	9th	3/4	4	66th	5/5	117	16th
2011–12	24/26	322	27th	10/10	146	20th	8/8	127	20th	3/3	5	61st	3/5	44	32nd
2012–13	24/26	746	9th	10/10	337	3rd	6/8	207	13th	3/3	42	24th	5/5	160	8th
2013–14	4/22	0	—N/a	3/9	0	—N/a	1/8	0	—N/a	0/2	0	—N/a	0/3	0	—N/a
2014–15	13/25	30	71st	7/10	20	64th	4/7	10	71st	2/3	0	—N/a	0/5	0	—N/a
2015–16	21/25	350	23rd	8/9	187	12th	7/8	80	33rd	2/3	8	57th	4/5	75	23rd

a. ^{1} Until 2009–10 season, IBU did not count an athlete's three worst races in overall World Cup scores. In 2010–11 season, all races were included in World Cup scores. Starting from 2011–12 season, the two worst results have been eliminated again. So the points in the "Points" column is represented after deduction, except 2010–11 season.

=== World Cup podiums ===
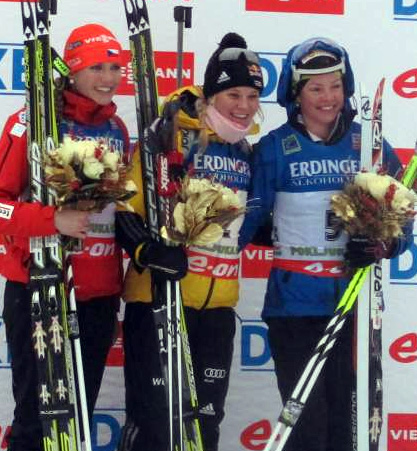
Gössner with Gabriela Soukalová and Marie Dorin Habert on the podium for her first World Cup win in Pokljuka, Slovenia

Gössner reached her first personal World Cup win during her fourth season. As of January 2013, she has won three individual World Cup races. In addition, she has won four relays as a part of the German team. Her first two victories both occurred in world championship races.

==== Individual podiums ====
- 3 victories – (2 Sp, 1 Pu)
- 10 podiums – (7 Sp, 2 Pu, 1 MS)

No.	Season	Date	Location	Discipline	Level	Place
1	2010/11	3 December 2010	Östersund, Sweden	7.5 km Sprint	World Cup	2nd
2	2010/11	4 December 2010	Östersund, Sweden	10 km Pursuit	World Cup	2nd
3	2010/11	11 February 2011	(United States) Fort Kent, USA	7.5 km Sprint	World Cup	2nd
4	2012/13	14 December 2012	Pokljuka, Slovenia	7.5 km Sprint	World Cup	2nd
5	2012/13	15 December 2012	Pokljuka, Slovenia	10 km Pursuit	World Cup	1st
6	2012/13	16 December 2012	Pokljuka, Slovenia	12.5 km Mass Start	World Cup	2nd
7	2012/13	5 January 2013	Oberhof, Germany	7.5 km Sprint	World Cup	1st
8	2012/13	11 January 2013	Ruhpolding, Germany	7.5 km Sprint	World Cup	1st
9	2012/13	14 March 2013	Khanty-Mansiysk, Russia	7.5 km Sprint	World Cup	3rd
10	2015/16	11 December 2015	Hochfilzen, Austria	7.5 km Sprint	World Cup	3rd

* Results are from UIPMB and IBU races which include the Biathlon World Cup, Biathlon World Championships and the Winter Olympic Games.

==== Team podiums ====
- 4 victories – (4 RL)
- 8 podiums – (8 RL)

No.	Season	Date	Location	Discipline	Level	Place	Partners
1	2010/11	22 January 2011	Antholz-Anterselva, Italy	4x6 km Relay	World Cup	3rd	(with Buchholz / Lang / Henkel)
2	2010/11	13 March 2011	Khanty-Mansiysk, Russia	4x6 km Relay	World Championships	1st	(with Henkel / Bachmann / Neuner)
3	2011/12	10 March 2012	Ruhpolding, Germany	4x6 km Relay	World Championships	1st	(with Bachmann / Neuner / Henkel)
4	2012/13	5 January 2013	Oberhof, Germany	4x6 km Relay	World Cup	3rd	(with Buchholz / Hildebrand / N. Horchler)
5	2012/13	20 January 2013	Antholz-Anterselva, Italy	4x6 km Relay	World Cup	1st	(with Hildebrand / N. Horchler / Henkel)
6	2012/13	10 March 2013	Sochi, Russia	4x6 km Relay	World Cup	1st	(with Henkel / Sachenbacher-Stehle / Dahlmeier)
7	2015/16	17 January 2016	Ruhpolding, Germany	4x6 km Relay	World Cup	2nd	(with K. Horchler / Hammerschmidt / Dahlmeier)
8	2015/16	13 February 2016	(United States) Presque Isle, USA	4x6 km Relay	World Cup	3rd	(with Preuß / Kummer / K. Horchler)

* Results are from UIPMB and IBU races which include the Biathlon World Cup, Biathlon World Championships and the Winter Olympic Games.

=== Overall biathlon record ===
As of the end of the 2012–13 season, Gössner has competed in 89 Biathlon World Cup events, claiming three individual wins: one pursuit and two sprint races. In team events, she claimed her maiden World Cup win in the 2011 World Championships relay with Germany. Gössner has achieved 34 top ten finishes—38.20 per cent of all the races she has entered.

Result	Individual	Sprint	Pursuit	Mass Start	Relay	Mixed Relay	Total		
Result	Individual	Sprint	Pursuit	Mass Start	Relay	Mixed Relay	Individual Events	Team Events	All Events
1st Place	–	2	1	–	4	–	3	4	7
2nd Place	–	3	1	1	1	–	5	1	6
3rd Place	–	2	–	–	3	–	2	3	5
Podiums	–	7	2	1	8	–	10	8	18
Top 10	–	13	8	4	14	3	25	17	42
Points	7	37	29	17	14	4	91	18	109
Others	8	17	9	–	–	–	33	–	33
Starts	15	54	38	17	14	4	124	18	142

* Results in all UIPMB and IBU World Cup races, Olympics and World Championships. Statistics as of 15 January 2017.

=== Biathlon Junior/Youth World Championships ===
Gössner has won two gold medals, as well as one silver and one bronze medal at the Biathlon Junior/Youth World Championships. In 2008, she competed at her first junior world championships when they were held in Ruhpolding, Germany, winning gold as part of the German relay team. One year later in Canmore, Alberta, Canada, Gössner won the pursuit title after claiming the silver medal in the sprint, and she also won bronze in the relay.

Event	Individual	Sprint	Pursuit	Relay
(Germany) 2008 Ruhpolding	33rd	15th	13th	Gold
(Canada) 2009 Canmore	4th	Silver	Gold	Bronze

== Cross-country skiing results ==
All results are sourced from the International Ski Federation (FIS).

=== Olympic Games ===
- 1 medal – (1 silver)

Year	Age	10 km individual	15 km skiathlon	30 km mass start	Sprint	4 × 5 km relay	Team sprint
2010	20	21	—	—	—	Silver	—

=== World Championships ===
- 1 medal – (1 silver)

Year	Age	10 km individual	15 km skiathlon	30 km mass start	Sprint	4 × 5 km relay	Team sprint
2009	19	—	—	—	19	Silver	—
2013	23	4	—	—	—	7	—

=== World Cup ===
==== Discipline standings ====
Season	Age	Season standings			Ski Tour standings	
Season	Age	Overall	Distance	Sprint	Tour de Ski	World Cup Final
2009	19	77	86	58	—	—
2010	20	59	32	37	DNF	—

==== Team podiums ====
- 1 podium – (1 RL)

No.	Season	Date	Location	Race	Level	Place	Teammates
1	2009–10	7 March 2010	Lahti, Finland	4 × 5 km Relay C/F	World Cup	2nd	Fessel / Zeller / Sachenbacher-Stehle

== Filmography ==
- Hungern für Gold, 2023
