= Eva Skalníková =

Czech cross-country skier

Personal information
- Nationality: Czech Republic
- Born: 15 January 1985 (age 41) Nové Město na Moravě, Czechoslovakia

Sport
- Sport: Skiing
- Club: LK Slovan Karlovy Vary

World Cup career
- Seasons: 6 – (2002, 2004, 2006, 2008–2010)
- Indiv. starts: 20
- Indiv. podiums: 0
- Team starts: 2
- Team podiums: 0
- Overall titles: 0
- Discipline titles: 0

Eva Skalníková (born 15 January 1985) is a Czech cross country skier who competed between 2002 and 2011. At the 2010 Winter Olympics in Vancouver, she finished 13th in the 4 × 5 km relay and 48th in the 30 km event.

At the FIS Nordic World Ski Championships 2009 in Liberec, Skalníková finished 13th in the 4 × 5 km relay, 45th in the 10 km, and 50th in the 7.5 km + 7.5 km double pursuit.

Her best World Cup individual finish was 42nd in a 5 km event in the Czech Republic in 2002.

== Cross-country skiing results ==
All results are sourced from the International Ski Federation (FIS).

=== Olympic Games ===
Year	Age	10 km individual	15 km skiathlon	30 km mass start	Sprint	4 × 5 km relay	Team sprint
2010	25	—	—	47	—	12	—

=== World Championships ===
Year	Age	10 km individual	15 km skiathlon	30 km mass start	Sprint	4 × 5 km relay	Team sprint
2009	24	45	49	—	—	12	—

=== World Cup ===
==== Season standings ====
Season	Age	Discipline standings			Ski Tour standings	
Season	Age	Overall	Distance	Sprint	Tour de Ski	World Cup Final
2002	17	NC	—N/a	—	—N/a	—N/a
2004	19	NC	NC	NC	—N/a	—N/a
2006	21	NC	NC	NC	—N/a	—N/a
2008	23	NC	NC	NC	DNF	—
2009	24	NC	NC	NC	DNF	—
2010	25	NC	NC	—	—	—
