= Morgan Arritola =

American cross-country skier

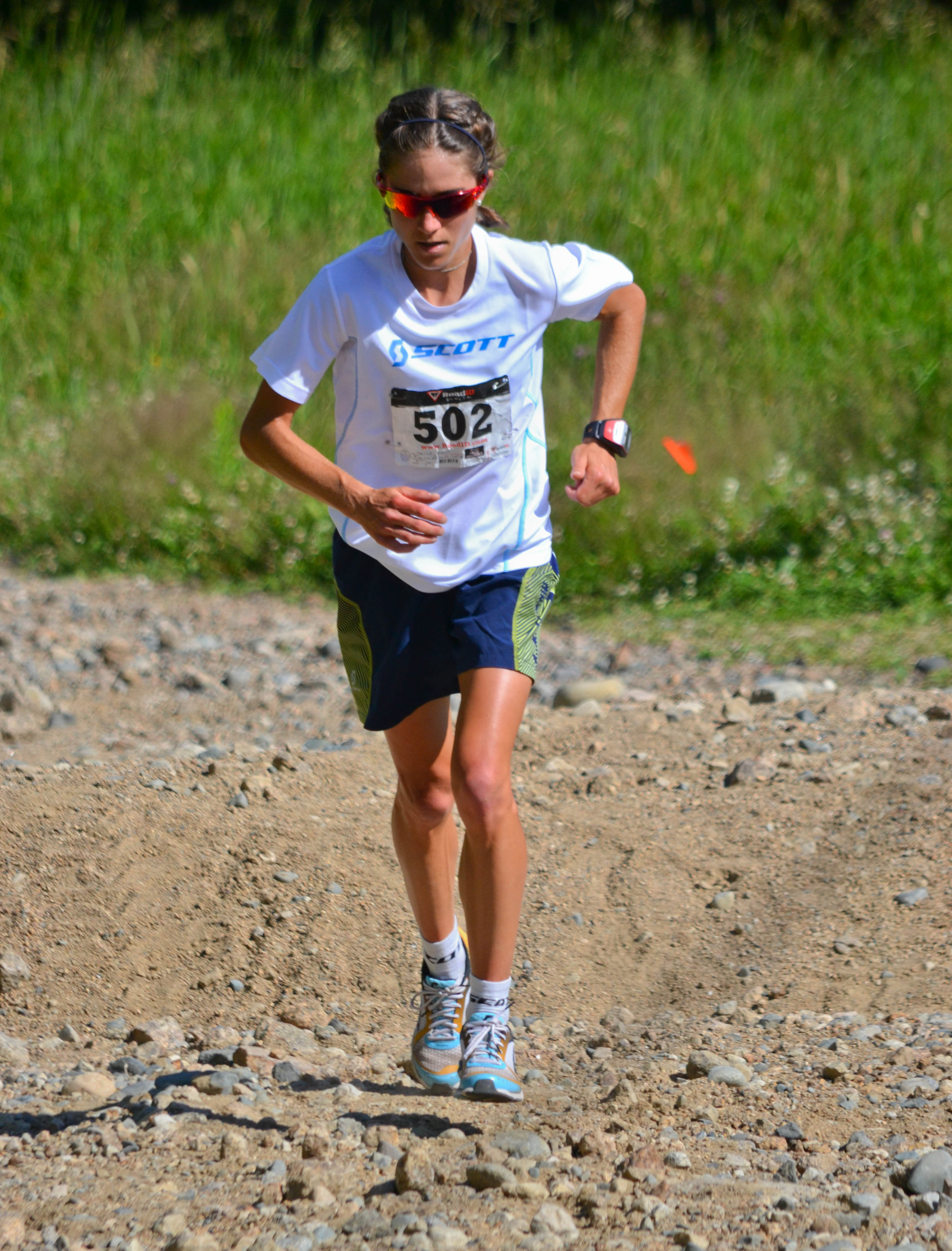
- Arritola in 2012

Personal information
- Nationality: United States
- Born: May 13, 1986 (age 40) Bend, Oregon, United Staters

Sport
- Sport: Skiing
- Club: Sun Valley Ski Education Foundation

World Cup career
- Seasons: 4 – (2008–2011)
- Indiv. starts: 19
- Indiv. podiums: 0
- Team starts: 3
- Team podiums: 0
- Overall titles: 0 – (90th in 2008)
- Discipline titles: 0

Morgan Arritola (born May 13, 1986 in California) is an American cross-country skier who has competed since 2005. Her best World Cup finish was 11th in a 4 × 5 km relay in Switzerland in 2007 while her best individual finish was 24th in a 7.5 km + 7.5 km double pursuit event in Canada in 2008.

At the FIS Nordic World Ski Championships 2009 in Liberec, Arritola had her best finish of 14th in the 4 × 5 km relay and her best individual finish of 22nd in the 30 km mass start.

It was announced on 19 January 2010 that she had qualified for the 2010 Winter Olympics where she earned her best finish of 12th in the 4 × 5 km relay and her best individual finish of 34th in the 10 km event.

Arritola competed in the World Mountain Running Championships in 2012 in Ponte di Legno, Italy, finishing third overall. Morgan won a bronze individual medal and led the US Women's Team to a gold medal. Arritola was the U.S. Mountain Running national champion in 2013 and 2015, and runner-up in 2014.

Arritola began her college education at Westminster College in Salt Lake City before being recruited for professional sport.

== Cross-country skiing results ==
All results are sourced from the International Ski Federation (FIS).

=== Olympic Games ===
Year	Age	10 km individual	15 km skiathlon	30 km mass start	Sprint	4 × 5 km relay	Team sprint
2010	21	34	34	DNF	—	11	—

=== World Championships ===
Year	Age	10 km individual	15 km skiathlon	30 km mass start	Sprint	4 × 5 km relay	Team sprint
2009	22	40	31	21	—	13	—
2011	24	—	43	21	—	—	—

=== World Cup ===
==== Season standings ====
Season	Age	Discipline standings			Ski Tour standings		
Season	Age	Overall	Distance	Sprint	Nordic Opening	Tour de Ski	World Cup Final
2008	21	90	58	—	—N/a	—	—
2009	22	115	82	—	—N/a	—	—
2010	23	106	84	NC	—N/a	—	—
2011	24	98	68	NC	54	—	—
