= Stefanie Böhler =

German cross-country skier

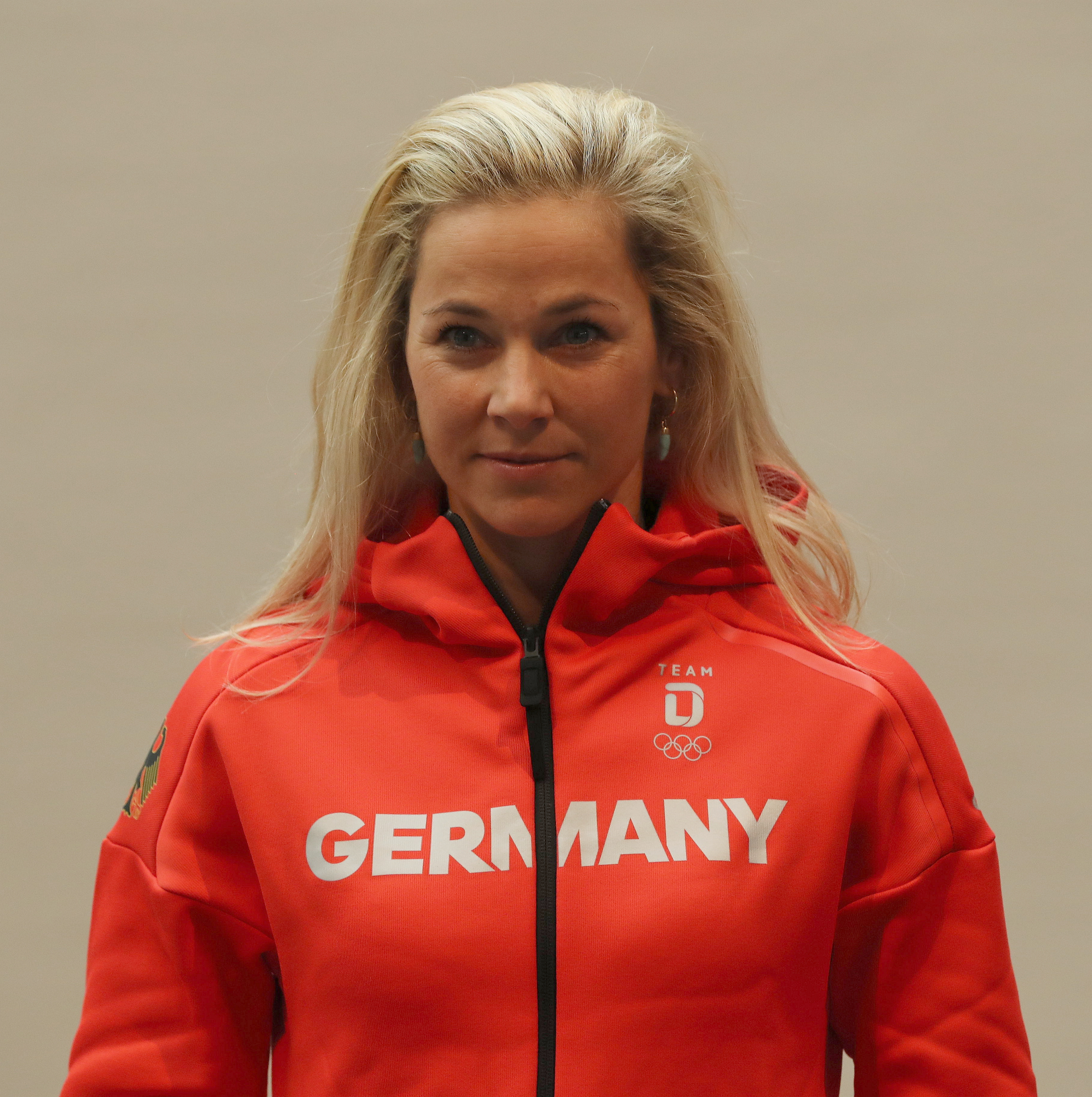
- Böhler in 2018

Personal information
- Nationality: Germany
- Born: 27 February 1981 (age 45) Bad Säckingen, West Germany
- Height: 1.70 m (5 ft 7 in)

Sport
- Sport: Skiing
- Club: SC Ibach

World Cup career
- Seasons: 17 – (2002–2018)
- Indiv. starts: 344
- Indiv. podiums: 2
- Indiv. wins: 0
- Team starts: 42
- Team podiums: 17
- Team wins: 4
- Overall titles: 0 – (11th in 2015)
- Discipline titles: 0
Medal record
Women's cross-country skiing
Representing Germany
Olympic Games
Silver medal – second place	2006 Turin	4 × 5 km relay
Bronze medal – third place	2014 Sochi	4 × 5 km relay
World Championships
Silver medal – second place	2007 Sapporo	4 × 5 km relay
Junior World Championships
Silver medal – second place	1999 Saalfelden	4 × 5 km relay
Silver medal – second place	2001 Karpacz	4 × 5 km relay
- Updated on 2 April 2019

Stefanie Böhler (born 27 February 1981) is a German former cross-country skier who competed between 1999 and 2018. She won a silver medal in the 4 × 5 km relay at the 2006 Winter Olympics in Turin. Her best individual finish was 20th in both the individual sprint and the 30 km events at those same games.

Böhler also won a silver medal in the 4 × 5 km relay at the 2007 FIS Nordic World Ski Championships. Her best individual result at the FIS Nordic World Ski Championships was sixth in the 30 km classical mass start event at Falun in 2015. She won the German national championship in the sprint in 2004 and the 5 km in 2006, and also won a 2002 Continental Cup event in Italy. She won a World Cup team sprint with Denise Herrmann in 2010.

With 343 individual World Cup starts, Böhler ranks second all-time, for both men and women, after Aino-Kaisa Saarinen with 354.

She announced her retirement from cross-country skiing in March 2019, together with teammates Elisabeth Schicho and Sandra Ringwald.

== Cross-country skiing results ==
All results are sourced from the International Ski Federation (FIS).

=== Olympic Games ===
- 2 medals – (1 silver, 1 bronze)

Year	Age	10 km	15 km skiathlon	30 km	Sprint	4 × 5 km relay	Team sprint
2006	25	38	28	20	20th	Silver	—
2010	29	23	35	17	—	—	—
2014	33	6	34	—	—	Bronze	4
2018	37	25	25	16	—	6	—

=== World Championships ===
- 1 medal – (1 silver)

Year	Age	10 km	15 km	Pursuit	30 km	Sprint	4 × 5 km relay	Team sprint
2003	22	—	—	31	29	10	—	—N/a
2005	24	24	—N/a	—	27	18	4	—
2007	26	27	—N/a	—	—	29	Silver	—
2009	28	32	—N/a	DNS	—	—	—	—
2011	30	—	—N/a	40	—	—	5	7
2015	34	43	—N/a	18	6	—	6	—
2017	36	10	—N/a	—	12	—	6	6

=== World Cup results ===
==== Season standings ====
Season	Age	Discipline standings			Ski Tour standings			
Season	Age	Overall	Distance	Sprint	Nordic Opening	Tour de Ski	World Cup Final	Ski Tour Canada
2002	21	75	—N/a	49	—N/a	—N/a	—N/a	—N/a
2003	22	40	—N/a	24	—N/a	—N/a	—N/a	—N/a
2004	23	41	39	33	—N/a	—N/a	—N/a	—N/a
2005	24	31	36	24	—N/a	—N/a	—N/a	—N/a
2006	25	27	27	28	—N/a	—N/a	—N/a	—N/a
2007	26	25	26	19	—N/a	21	—N/a	—N/a
2008	27	25	25	21	—N/a	23	22	—N/a
2009	28	14	15	26	—N/a	13	21	—N/a
2010	29	45	32	33	—N/a	DNF	DNF	—N/a
2011	30	45	33	39	31	DNF	29	—N/a
2012	31	43	24	65	40	DNF	28	—N/a
2013	32	80	66	NC	38	28	—	—N/a
2014	33	31	23	58	—	24	21	—N/a
2015	34	11	11	47	15	11	—N/a	—N/a
2016	35	20	17	48	15	16	—N/a	20
2017	36	22	20	74	33	13	17	—N/a
2018	37	25	17	71st	29	10	44	—N/a

==== Individual podiums ====
- 2 podiums – (2 WC)

No.	Season	Date	Location	Race	Level	Place
1	2008–09	30 January 2009	Rybinsk, Russia	10 km Mass Start F	World Cup	3rd
2	2014–15	23 January 2015	Rybinsk, Russia	10 km Individual F	World Cup	3rd

==== Team podiums ====
- 4 victories – (2 RL, 2 TS)
- 17 podiums – (11 RL, 6 TS)

No.	Season	Date	Location	Race	Level	Place	Teammate(s)
1	2002–03	26 January 2003	Oberhof, Germany	6 × 1.5 km Team Sprint F	World Cup	3rd	Bauer
2	2003–04	23 November 2003	Beitostølen, Norway	4 × 5 km Relay C/F	World Cup	2nd	Henkel / Sachenbacher / Künzel
3	2003–04	14 December 2003	Davos, Switzerland	4 × 5 km Relay C/F	World Cup	2nd	Henkel / Sachenbacher / Künzel
4	2004–05	21 November 2004	Gällivare, Sweden	4 × 5 km Relay C/F	World Cup	3rd	Sachenbacher / Reschwam Schulze / Künzel
5	2004–05	5 December 2004	Bern, Switzerland	6 × 1.1 km Team Sprint F	World Cup	2nd	Künzel
6	2004–05	12 December 2004	Lago di Tesero, Italy	4 × 5 km Relay C/F	World Cup	2nd	Henkel / Böhler / Sachenbacher
7	2004–05	23 January 2005	Pragelato, Italy	6 × 1.2 km Team Sprint C	World Cup	1st	Bauer
8	2005–06	20 November 2005	Beitostølen, Norway	4 × 5 km Relay C/F	World Cup	2nd	Henkel / Künzel-Nystad / Sachenbacher-Stehle
9	2006–07	17 December 2006	La Clusaz, France	4 × 5 km Relay C/F	World Cup	1st	Bauer / Künzel-Nystad / Sachenbacher-Stehle
10	2006–07	25 March 2007	Falun, Sweden	4 × 5 km Relay C/F	World Cup	1st	Bauer / Künzel-Nystad / Sachenbacher-Stehle
11	2007–08	25 November 2007	Beitostølen, Norway	4 × 5 km Relay C/F	World Cup	2nd	Zeller / Sachenbacher-Stehle / Künzel-Nystad
12	2007–08	9 December 2007	Davos, Switzerland	4 × 5 km Relay C/F	World Cup	2nd	Henkel / Zeller / Sachenbacher-Stehle
13	2007–08	24 February 2008	Falun, Sweden	4 × 5 km Relay C/F	World Cup	3rd	Zeller / Künzel-Nystad / Sachenbacher-Stehle
14	2008–09	21 December 2008	Düsseldorf, Germany	6 × 0.8 km Team Sprint F	World Cup	3rd	Künzel-Nystad
15	2008–09	18 January 2009	Whistler, Canada	6 × 1.3 km Team Sprint F	World Cup	2nd	Fessel
16	2009–10	24 January 2010	Rybinsk, Russia	6 × 1.3 km Team Sprint F	World Cup	1st	Sachenbacher-Stehle
17	2016–17	22 January 2017	Ulricehamn, Sweden	4 × 5 km Relay C/F	World Cup	2nd	Hennig / Carl / Ringwald
