= Claudia Nystad =

German cross-country skier

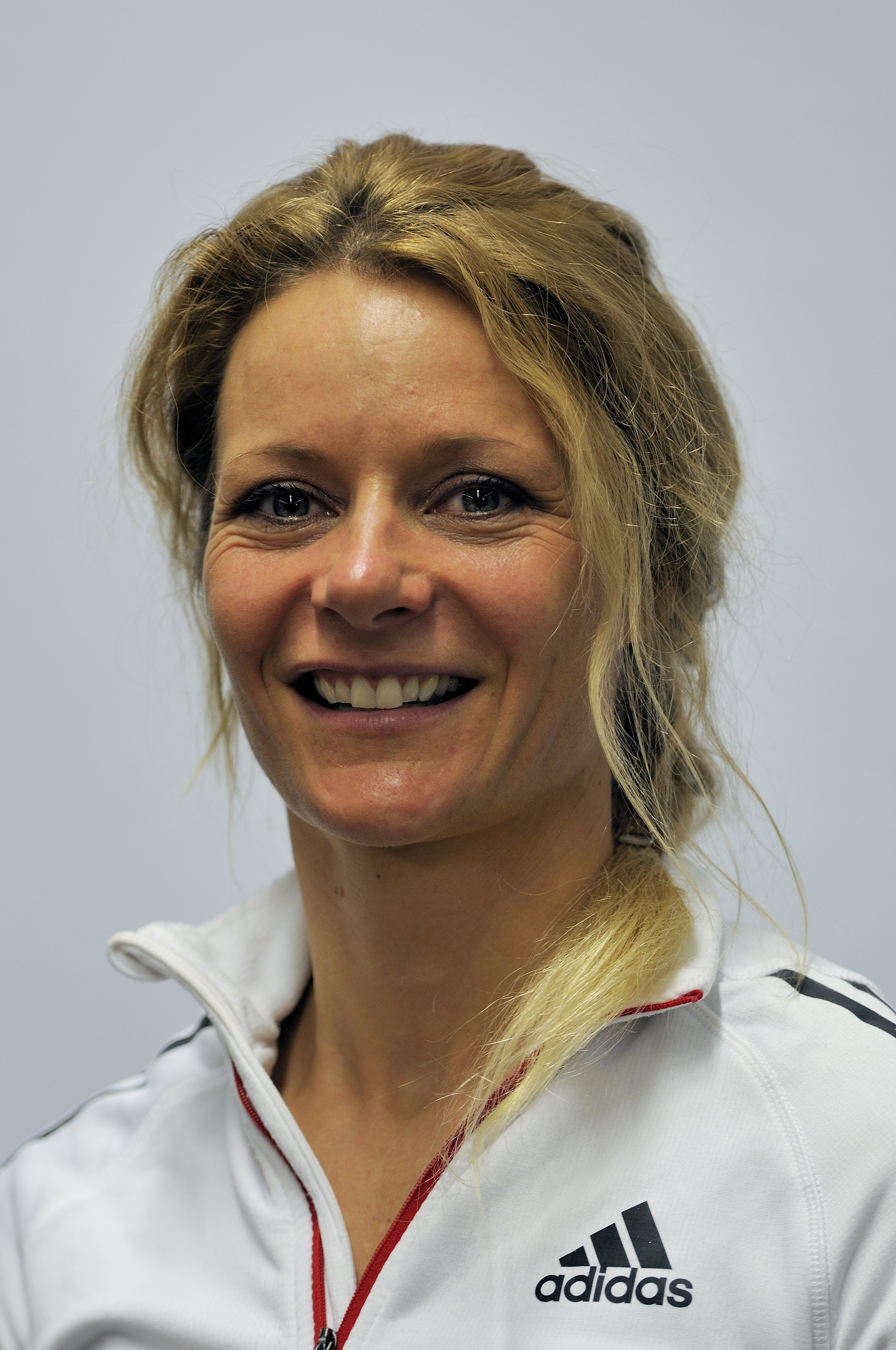

Personal information
- Nationality: Germany
- Born: Claudia Künzel; 1 February 1978 (age 48) Zschopau, East Germany

Sport
- Sport: Skiing
- Club: WSC Erzgebierge Oberwiesenthal

World Cup career
- Seasons: 15 (1998–2010, 2014–2015)
- Indiv. starts: 232
- Indiv. podiums: 26
- Indiv. wins: 4
- Team starts: 45
- Team podiums: 26
- Team wins: 7
- Overall titles: 0 (5th in 2005)
- Discipline titles: 0
Medal record
Women's cross-country skiing
Representing Germany
Olympic Games
Gold medal – first place	2002 Salt Lake City	4 × 5 km relay
Gold medal – first place	2010 Vancouver	Team sprint
Silver medal – second place	2006 Turin	Individual sprint
Silver medal – second place	2006 Turin	4 × 5 km relay
Silver medal – second place	2010 Vancouver	4 × 5 km relay
Bronze medal – third place	2014 Sochi	4 × 5 km relay
World Championships
Gold medal – first place	2003 Val di Fiemme	4 × 5 km relay
Silver medal – second place	2003 Val di Fiemme	Individual sprint
Silver medal – second place	2007 Sapporo	Team sprint
Silver medal – second place	2007 Sapporo	4 × 5 km relay
Silver medal – second place	2009 Liberec	4 × 5 km relay
Junior World Championships
Silver medal – second place	1998 Pontresina	5 km freestyle

Claudia Nystad (née Künzel; born 1 February 1978) is a German top-level cross-country skier. She was born in Zschopau, East Germany, and represents the sports club WSC Erzgebirge Oberwiesenthal. Besides her civilian sports career, she serves as a sports soldier with the German Federal Armed Forces.

== Cross-country skiing results ==
All results are sourced from the International Ski Federation (FIS).

=== Olympic Games ===
- 6 medals (2 gold, 3 silver, 1 bronze)

Year	Age	10 km	15 km	Pursuit	30 km	Sprint	4 × 5 km relay	Team sprint
2002	24	—	26	55	—	4	Gold	—N/a
2006	28	17	—N/a	18	6	Silver	Silver	—
2010	32	16	—N/a	—	—	—	Silver	Gold
2014	36	—	—N/a	42	—	34	Bronze	—

=== World Championships ===
- 5 medals (1 gold, 4 silver)

Year	Age	10 km	15 km	Pursuit	30 km	Sprint	4 × 5 km relay	Team sprint
2001	23	—	17	27	CNX^{[a]}	14	4	—N/a
2003	25	—	—	11	19	Silver	Gold	—N/a
2005	27	—	—N/a	10	6	14	4	4
2007	29	15	—N/a	17	—	26	Silver	Silver
2009	31	—	—N/a	DNF	22	18	Silver	—
2015	37	42	—N/a	—	—	—	—	—

a. ^{1} Cancelled due to extremely cold weather.

=== World Cup ===
==== Season standings ====
Season	Age	Discipline standings					Ski Tour standings		
Season	Age	Overall	Distance	Long distance	Middle distance	Sprint	Nordic Opening	Tour de Ski	World Cup Final
1998	20	NC	—N/a	NC	—N/a	—	—N/a	—N/a	—N/a
1999	21	NC	—N/a	NC	—N/a	—	—N/a	—N/a	—N/a
2000	22	71	—N/a	—	NC	51	—N/a	—N/a	—N/a
2001	23	23	—N/a	—N/a	—N/a	9	—N/a	—N/a	—N/a
2002	24	41	—N/a	—N/a	—N/a	23	—N/a	—N/a	—N/a
2003	25	7	—N/a	—N/a	—N/a	7	—N/a	—N/a	—N/a
2004	26	7	6	—N/a	—N/a	10	—N/a	—N/a	—N/a
2005	27	5	7	—N/a	—N/a	5	—N/a	—N/a	—N/a
2006	28	7	9	—N/a	—N/a	8	—N/a	—N/a	—N/a
2007	29	13	15	—N/a	—N/a	14	—N/a	19	—N/a
2008	30	8	5	—N/a	—N/a	13	—N/a	6	3rd place, bronze medalist(s)
2009	31	13	14	—N/a	—N/a	21	—N/a	16	7
2010	32	43	31	—N/a	—N/a	31	—N/a	DNF	—
2014	36	38	27	—N/a	—N/a	67	36	19	DNF
2015	37	50	34	—N/a	—N/a	65	17	DNF	—N/a

==== Individual podiums ====
- 4 victories (2 WC, 2 SWC)
- 26 podiums (21 WC, 5 SWC)

No.	Season	Date	Location	Race	Level	Place
1	2000–01	4 February 2001	Nové Město, Czech Republic	1.0 km Sprint F	World Cup	3rd
2	2002–03	23 November 2002	Kiruna, Sweden	5 km Individual F	World Cup	3rd
3	2002–03	11 December 2002	Clusone, Italy	1.4 km Sprint F	World Cup	2nd
4	2003–04	23 November 2002	Beitostølen, Norway	10 km Individual F	World Cup	3rd
5	2003–04	6 December 2003	Toblach, Italy	15 km Mass Start F	World Cup	3rd
6	2003–04	21 December 2003	Ramsau, Austria	7.5 km + 7.5 km Pursuit C/F	World Cup	3rd
7	2003–04	10 January 2004	Otepää, Estonia	15 km Mass Start C	World Cup	1st
8	2003–04	17 January 2004	Nové Město, Czech Republic	10 km Individual C	World Cup	2nd
9	2003–04	24 February 2004	Trondheim, Norway	1.5 km Sprint F	World Cup	3rd
10	2004–05	4 December 2004	Bern, Switzerland	0.8 km Sprint F	World Cup	2nd
11	2004–05	16 January 2005	Nové Město, Czech Republic	1.2 km Sprint F	World Cup	3rd
12	2004–05	22 January 2005	Pragelato, Italy	7.5 km + 7.5 km Pursuit C/F	World Cup	3rd
13	2005–06	26 November 2005	Rukatunturi, Finland	10 km Individual C	World Cup	3rd
14	2005–06	11 December 2005	Vernon, Canada	1.3 km Sprint F	World Cup	2nd
15	2005–06	17 December 2005	Canmore, Canada	15 km Mass Start C	World Cup	3rd
16	2005–06	30 December 2005	Nové Město, Czech Republic	1.2 km Sprint F	World Cup	3rd
17	2005–06	21 January 2006	Oberstdorf, Germany	7.5 km + 7.5 km Pursuit C/F	World Cup	2nd
18	2006–07	21 January 2007	Rybinsk, Russia	1.2 km Sprint F	World Cup	2nd
19	2007–08	1 January 2008	Nové Město, Czech Republic	10 km Pursuit F	Stage World Cup	3rd
20	2007–08	5 January 2008	Val di Fiemme, Italy	10 km Mass Start C	Stage World Cup	3rd
21	2007–08	6 January 2008	Val di Fiemme, Italy	9 km Pursuit F	Stage World Cup	3rd
22	2007–08	8 March 2008	Oslo, Norway	30 km Individual F	World Cup	3rd
23	2007–08	14 March 2008	Bormio, Italy	2.5 km Individual F	World Cup	1st
24	2007–08	16 March 2008	Bormio, Italy	10 km Pursuit F	World Cup	3rd
25	2008–09	27 December 2008	Oberhof, Germany	2.8 km Individual F	Stage World Cup	1st
26	2008–09	20 March 2009	Falun, Sweden	2.5 km Individual F	Stage World Cup	1st

==== Team podiums ====
- 7 victories (4 RL, 3 TS)
- 26 podiums (17 RL, 9 TS)

No.	Season	Date	Location	Race	Level	Place	Teammate(s)
1	2001–02	10 March 2002	Falun, Sweden	4 × 5 km Relay C/F	World Cup	3rd	Henkel / Bauer / Sachenbacher
2	2002–03	24 November 2002	Kiruna, Sweden	4 × 5 km Relay C/F	World Cup	2nd	Henkel / Bauer / Sachenbacher
3	2002–03	8 December 2002	Davos, Switzerland	4 × 5 km Relay C/F	World Cup	3rd	Henkel / Bauer / Sachenbacher
4	2002–03	19 January 2003	Nové Město, Czech Republic	4 × 5 km Relay C/F	World Cup	1st	Bauer / Henkel / Sachenbacher
5	2002–03	26 January 2003	Oberhof, Germany	6 × 1.5 km Team Sprint F	World Cup	2nd	Henkel
6	2002–03	14 February 2003	Asiago, Italy	6 × 1.4 km Team Sprint F	World Cup	1st	Sachenbacher
7	2002–03	23 March 2003	Falun, Sweden	4 × 5 km Relay C/F	World Cup	1st	Henkel / Bauer / Sachenbacher
8	2003–04	26 October 2003	Düsseldorf, Germany	6 × 0.8 km Team Sprint F	World Cup	2nd	Disl
9	2003–04	23 November 2003	Beitostølen, Norway	4 × 5 km Relay C/F	World Cup	2nd	Henkel / Böhler / Sachenbacher
10	2003–04	7 December 2003	Toblach, Italy	6 × 1.2 km Team Sprint F	World Cup	2nd	Sachenbacher
11	2003–04	14 December 2003	Davos, Switzerland	4 × 5 km Relay C/F	World Cup	2nd	Böhler / Henkel / Sachenbacher
12	2003–04	11 January 2004	Otepää, Estonia	4 × 5 km Relay C/F	World Cup	2nd	Henkel / Bauer / Sachenbacher
13	2003–04	7 February 2004	La Clusaz, France	4 × 5 km Relay C/F	World Cup	2nd	Henkel / Bauer / Reschwam Schulze
14	2003–04	15 February 2004	Oberstdorf, Germany	6 × 0.8 km Team Sprint F	World Cup	2nd	Sachenbacher
15	2004–05	21 November 2004	Gällivare, Sweden	4 × 5 km Relay C/F	World Cup	3rd	Böhler / Sachenbacher / Reschwam Schulze
16	2004–05	5 December 2004	Bern, Switzerland	6 × 1.1 km Team Sprint F	World Cup	2nd	Böhler
17	2004–05	12 December 2004	Lago di Tesero, Italy	4 × 5 km Relay C/F	World Cup	2nd	Henkel / Böhler / Sachenbacher
18	2004–05	23 January 2005	Pragelato, Italy	6 × 1.2 km Team Sprint C	World Cup	1st	Bauer
19	2005–06	20 November 2005	Beitostølen, Norway	4 × 5 km Relay C/F	World Cup	2nd	Henkel / Böhler / Sachenbacher-Stehle
20	2005–06	18 March 2006	Sapporo, Japan	6 × 0.8 km Team Sprint F	World Cup	1st	Sachenbacher-Stehle
21	2006–07	19 November 2006	Gällivare, Sweden	4 × 5 km Relay C/F	World Cup	2nd	Henkel / Zeller / Sachenbacher-Stehle
22	2006–07	17 December 2006	La Clusaz, France	4 × 5 km Relay C/F	World Cup	1st	Böhler / Bauer / Sachenbacher-Stehle
23	2006–07	25 March 2007	Falun, Sweden	4 × 5 km Relay C/F	World Cup	1st	Bauer / Böhler / Sachenbacher-Stehle
24	2007–08	25 November 2007	Beitostølen, Norway	4 × 5 km Relay C/F	World Cup	2nd	Böhler / Zeller / Sachenbacher-Stehle
25	2007–08	24 February 2008	Falun, Sweden	4 × 5 km Relay C/F	World Cup	3rd	Böhler / Zeller / Sachenbacher-Stehle
26	2008–09	21 December 2008	Düsseldorf, Germany	6 × 0.8 km Team Sprint F	World Cup	3rd	Böhler

== Personal life ==
On June 27, 2005, Künzel married Trond Nystad from Norway, ex-coach of the American cross-country ski team.

In the summer of 2007, Künzel donated her gold medal from the 2002 Winter Olympics to benefit the 'Hansel und Gretel' foundation (Hansel and Gretel in German) committed to helping abused children.

== Honours and awards ==
- Saxon Sportswoman of the Year (2007 and 2010)
- Silver Bay Leaf (2002, 2006 and 2010)
- Badge of Honour of the German Ski Association in Gold (2010)
- Bundeswehr Cross of Honour in Gold (2004)
- Badge of Honour of the Bundeswehr (2002)
