= Cross-country skiing at the 2010 Winter Olympics – Women's 4 × 5 kilometre relay =

Women's 4 × 5 kilometre relay at the XXI Olympic Winter Games
- Pictogram for cross country
- Venue: Whistler Olympic Park
- Dates: 25 February 2010
- Competitors: 64 (16 teams) from 16 nations
- Winning time: 55:19.5

Medalists
1st place, gold medalist(s)		Vibeke Skofterud; Therese Johaug; Kristin Størmer Steira; Marit Bjørgen	Norway
2nd place, silver medalist(s)		Katrin Zeller; Evi Sachenbacher-Stehle; Miriam Gössner; Claudia Nystad	Germany
3rd place, bronze medalist(s)		Pirjo Muranen; Virpi Kuitunen; Riitta-Liisa Roponen; Aino-Kaisa Saarinen	Finland

The women's 4 × 5 kilometre relay cross-country skiing competition at the 2010 Winter Olympics in Vancouver, Canada was held on 25 February at Whistler Olympic Park at 11:15 PST.

Russia was the defending Olympic champion with the team of Natalia Baranova-Masolkina, Larisa Kurkina, Yuliya Chepalova, and Yevgeniya Medvedeva-Arbuzova. Baranova-Masolikina retired following the 2006 Winter Olympics while Chepalova retired in August 2009 after testing positive for recombinant erythropoietin (EPO) doping. (She would be banned from the International Ski Federation (FIS) for two years in a decision rendered on 23 December 2009 that would run until 20 August 2011.) The defending world champions were the Finnish team of Pirjo Muranen, Virpi Kuitunen, Riitta-Liisa Roponen, and Aino-Kaisa Saarinen (The same foursome also won the event at the 2007 championships.) The last World Cup competition for this event prior to the 2010 Games took place 22 November 2009 in Beitostoelen, Norway and was won by the Swedish team of Anna Olsson, Sara Lindborg, Anna Haag, and Charlotte Kalla.

Each team used four skiers who each compete over two separate 2.5 km circuits with classical using the red circuit while freestyle using the blue circuit. The first two raced in the classical technique, and the final pair of skiers raced freestyle technique.

== Results ==
The following are the results of the event.

Sweden's Olsson had the fastest first leg with Norway and Germany, who were using the same foursome in the starting order shown that won them silver at last year's world championships, rounding out the top three. Kowalczyk had the fastest second leg and in the classical technique, moved Poland (who would finish sixth) into the lead after the second exchange with Italy (who would finish fourth) and Norway rounding out the top three. Kalla of Sweden would have the fastest third leg and in the freestyle technique to propel her country from eighth to fifth. The top three after the third exchange was Norway, Italy, and tied for third with Germany and defending world champion Finland, who was using the same foursome in their same starting order. Norway's Bjørgen had the final anchor leg to give her team their first Olympic gold medal in this event since the 1984 Winter Olympics. Defending Olympic champion Russia, with Medvedeva (formerly Medvedeva-Abruzova) being the only returning member, finished a disappointing eighth. Meanwhile, the Swedes, winners of the last World Cup event, finished fifth with Kalla being the only returnee of the foursome that won the previous November.

Rank	Bib	Country	Time	Deficit
1st place, gold medalist(s)	4	Norway; Vibeke Skofterud; Therese Johaug; Kristin Størmer Steira; Marit Bjørgen	55:19.5; 14:49.9; 14:46.5; 12:53.2; 12:49.9	0.0
2nd place, silver medalist(s)	2	Germany; Katrin Zeller; Evi Sachenbacher-Stehle; Miriam Gössner; Claudia Nystad	55:44.1; 14:53.7; 15:00.6; 12:52.0; 12:57.8	+24.6
3rd place, bronze medalist(s)	1	Finland; Pirjo Muranen; Virpi Kuitunen; Riitta-Liisa Roponen; Aino-Kaisa Saarinen	55:49.9; 15:32.4; 14:35.7; 12:38.2; 13:03.6	+30.4
4	5	Italy; Arianna Follis; Marianna Longa; Silvia Rupil; Sabina Valbusa	56:04.9; 14:58.6; 14:29.4; 13:01.8; 13:35.1	+45.4
5	3	Sweden; Anna Olsson; Magdalena Pajala; Charlotte Kalla; Ida Ingemarsdotter	56:18.9; 14:47.1; 15:35.6; 12:25.0; 13:31.2	+59.4
6	9	France; Aurore Cuinet; Karine Laurent Philippot; Celia Bourgeois; Cécile Storti	56:30.6; 15:13.3; 14:38.8; 12:59.9; 13:38.6	+1:11.1
7	8	Russia; Olga Zavyalova; Irina Khazova; Yevgeniya Medvedeva; Natalya Korostelyova	57:00.9; 15:15.2; 15:19.0; 13:01.1; 13:25.6	+1:41.4
8	7	Japan; Madoka Natsumi; Masako Ishida; Nobuko Fukuda; Michiko Kashiwabara	57:40.4; 15:03.0; 14:50.4; 13:34.5; 14:12.5	+2:20.9
9	11	Kazakhstan; Elena Kolomina; Oxana Yatskaya; Tatyana Roshchina; Svetlana Malahova-Shishkina	58:23.3; 15:29.1; 15:25.7; 13:47.7; 13:40.8	+3:03.8
10	10	Belarus; Nastassia Dubarezava; Alena Sannikova; Olga Vasiljonok; Ekaterina Rudakova	58:28.4; 15:36.5; 15:29.2; 13:22.1; 14:00.6	+3:08.9
11	14	United States; Kikkan Randall; Holly Brooks; Morgan Arritola; Caitlin Compton	58:57.5; 14:57.5; 16:12.8; 13:41.6; 14:05.6	+3:38.0
12	13	Czech Republic; Eva Nývltová; Kamila Rajdlová; Ivana Janečková; Eva Skalníková	59:11.2; 15:15.0; 15:28.9; 13:34.3; 14:53.0	+3:51.7
13	12	Ukraine; Tetyana Zavalíy; Kateryna Grygorenko; Maryna Antsybor; Valentyna Shevchenko	59:25.7; 15:38.1; 16:16.7; 13:34.2; 13:56.7	+4:06.2
14	16	Slovenia; Anja Eržen; Katja Višnar; Vesna Fabjan; Barbara Jezeršek	59:47.5; 16:00.8; 16:32.3; 13:25.0; 13:49.4	+4:28.0
15	15	Canada; Daria Gaiazova; Perianne Jones; Chandra Crawford; Madeleine Williams	1:00:05.0; 15:35.8; 16:14.7; 14:17.7; 13:56.8	+4:45.5
DSQ	6	Poland; Kornelia Marek; Justyna Kowalczyk; Paulina Maciuszek; Sylwia Jaśkowiec	56:29.4; 15:25.3; 14:00.3; 13:38.4; 13:25.4	+1:09.9

== See also ==
- Cross-country skiing at the 2010 Winter Paralympics – Women's 3 x 2.5 km Relay
