= Artem Zhmurko =

Russian cross country skier (born 1985)

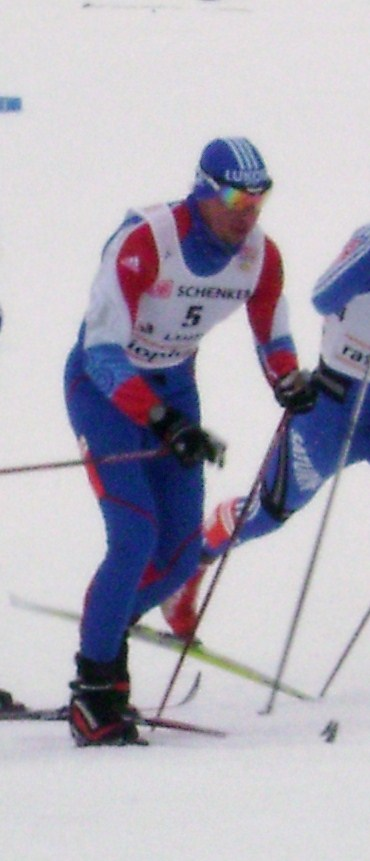
- Artem Zhmurko in 2010

Personal information
- Full name: Artem Vladimirovich Zhmurko
- Nationality: Russia
- Born: 3 October 1985 (age 40) Polysayevo, Soviet Union

Sport
- Sport: Skiing

World Cup career
- Seasons: 3 – (2010–2011, 2013)
- Indiv. starts: 17
- Indiv. podiums: 1
- Indiv. wins: 1
- Team starts: 2
- Team podiums: 0
- Overall titles: 0 – (33rd in 2010)
- Discipline titles: 0

Artem Vladimirovich Zhmurko (Russian: Артём Влади́мирович Жмурко́, born 10 October 1985) is a Russian cross-country skier who has competed between 2008 and 2017. His lone World Cup victory was in a 15 km + 15 km double pursuit event in Russia in January 2010.

Zhmurko also has two victories in lesser events, earning them in 2008 and 2009 respectively.

== Cross-country skiing results ==
All results are sourced from the International Ski Federation (FIS).

=== World Cup ===
==== Season standings ====
Season	Age	Discipline standings			Ski Tour standings		
Season	Age	Overall	Distance	Sprint	Nordic Opening	Tour de Ski	World Cup Final
2010	24	33	19	NC	—N/a	—	15
2011	25	159	100	—	—	—	—
2013	27	NC	NC	NC	—	60	—

==== Individual podiums ====
- 1 victory – (1 WC)
- 1 podium – (1 WC)

No.	Season	Date	Location	Race	Level	Place
1	2009–10	23 January 2010	Rybinsk, Russia	15 km + 15 km Skiathlon C/F	World Cup	1st
