= Katrin Zeller =

German cross-country skier (born 1979)

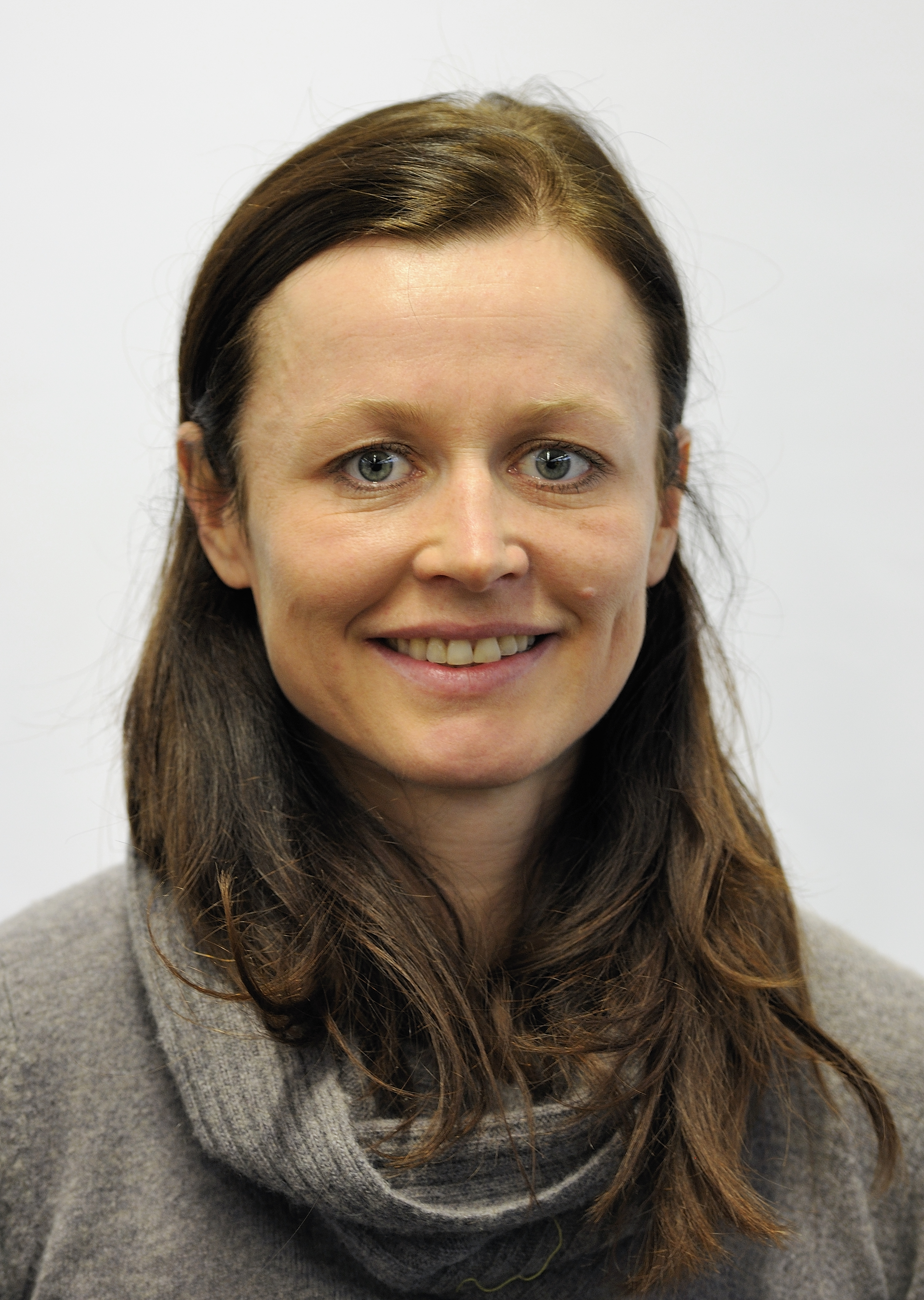
- Zeller in 2014

Personal information
- Nationality: Germany
- Born: 1 March 1979 (age 47) Oberstdorf, West Germany

Sport
- Sport: Skiing
- Club: SC Oberstdorf

World Cup career
- Seasons: 12 – (2000, 2004–2014)
- Indiv. starts: 200
- Indiv. podiums: 1
- Indiv. wins: 0
- Team starts: 10
- Team podiums: 6
- Team wins: 0
- Overall titles: 0 – (13th in 2012)
- Discipline titles: 0
Medal record
Women's cross country skiing
Representing Germany
Olympic Games
Silver medal – second place	2010 Vancouver	4 × 5 km relay
World Championships
Silver medal – second place	2009 Liberec	4 × 5 km relay
Junior World Championships
Silver medal – second place	1999 Saalfelden	4 × 5 km relay

Katrin Zeller (born 1 March 1979 in Oberstdorf, Bavaria, West Germany) is a German cross-country skier who competed between 1997 and 2014. She won a silver medal in the 4 × 5 km relay at the 2010 Winter Olympics in Vancouver, Canada.

Zeller also won a silver medal in the 4 × 5 km relay at the FIS Nordic World Ski Championships 2009 in Liberec. Her best individual finish at the championships was 17th in the 7.5 km + 7.5 km double pursuit at those same championships.

Her best individual World Cup finish was third in a 10 km event at Lahti in 2008. She has seven total victories at various levels in her career from 2003 to 2008.

== Cross-country skiing results ==
All results are sourced from the International Ski Federation (FIS).

=== Olympic Games ===
- 1 medal – (1 silver)

Year	Age	10 km individual	15 km skiathlon	30 km mass start	Sprint	4 × 5 km relay	Team sprint
2010	31	—	24	19	14	Silver	—
2014	35	23	25	12	—	—	—

=== World Championships ===
- 1 medal – (1 silver)

Year	Age	10 km individual	15 km skiathlon	30 km mass start	Sprint	4 × 5 km relay	Team sprint
2007	28	29	32	25	—	—	—
2009	30	18	17	—	—	Silver	7
2011	32	22	16	12	—	5	—
2013	34	11	25	14	—	7	—

=== World Cup ===
==== Season standings ====
Season	Age	Discipline standings					Ski Tour standings		
Season	Age	Overall	Distance	Long Distance	Middle Distance	Sprint	Nordic Opening	Tour de Ski	World Cup Final
2000	21	NC	—N/a	—	—	NC	—N/a	—N/a	—N/a
2004	25	NC	NC	—N/a	—N/a	—	—N/a	—N/a	—N/a
2005	26	NC	NC	—N/a	—N/a	NC	—N/a	—N/a	—N/a
2006	27	104	77	—N/a	—N/a	82	—N/a	—N/a	—N/a
2007	28	35	22	—N/a	—N/a	43	—N/a	DNF	—N/a
2008	29	17	16	—N/a	—N/a	46	—N/a	9	8
2009	30	25	22	—N/a	—N/a	47	—N/a	17	14
2010	31	23	24	—N/a	—N/a	62	—N/a	9	21
2011	32	15	15	—N/a	—N/a	26	16	12	12
2012	33	13	15	—N/a	—N/a	32	37	6	14
2013	34	14	14	—N/a	—N/a	46	23	10	12
2014	35	25	22	—N/a	—N/a	57	42	12	19

==== Individual podiums ====
- 1 podium

No.	Season	Date	Location	Race	Level	Place
1	2007–08	2 March 2008	Lahti, Finland	10 km Individual C	World Cup	3rd

==== Team podiums ====
- 6 podiums – (5 RL, 1 TS)

No.	Season	Date	Location	Race	Level	Place	Teammate(s)
1	2006–07	19 November 2006	Gällivare, Sweden	4 × 5 km Relay C/F	World Cup	2nd	Henkel / Sachenbacher-Stehle / Künzel-Nystad
2	2007–08	25 November 2007	Beitostølen, Norway	4 × 5 km Relay C/F	World Cup	2nd	Böhler / Sachenbacher-Stehle / Künzel-Nystad
3	2007–08	9 December 2007	Davos, Switzerland	4 × 5 km Relay C/F	World Cup	2nd	Henkel / Sachenbacher-Stehle / Böhler
4	2007–08	24 February 2008	Falun, Sweden	4 × 5 km Relay C/F	World Cup	3rd	Böhler / Künzel-Nystad / Sachenbacher-Stehle
5	2009–10	7 March 2010	Lahti, Finland	4 × 5 km Relay C/F	World Cup	2nd	Fessel / Gössner / Sachenbacher-Stehle
6	2013–14	22 December 2013	Asiago, Italy	6 × 1.25 km Team Sprint C	World Cup	3rd	Herrmann
