= Evi Sachenbacher-Stehle =

German cross-country skier and biathlete

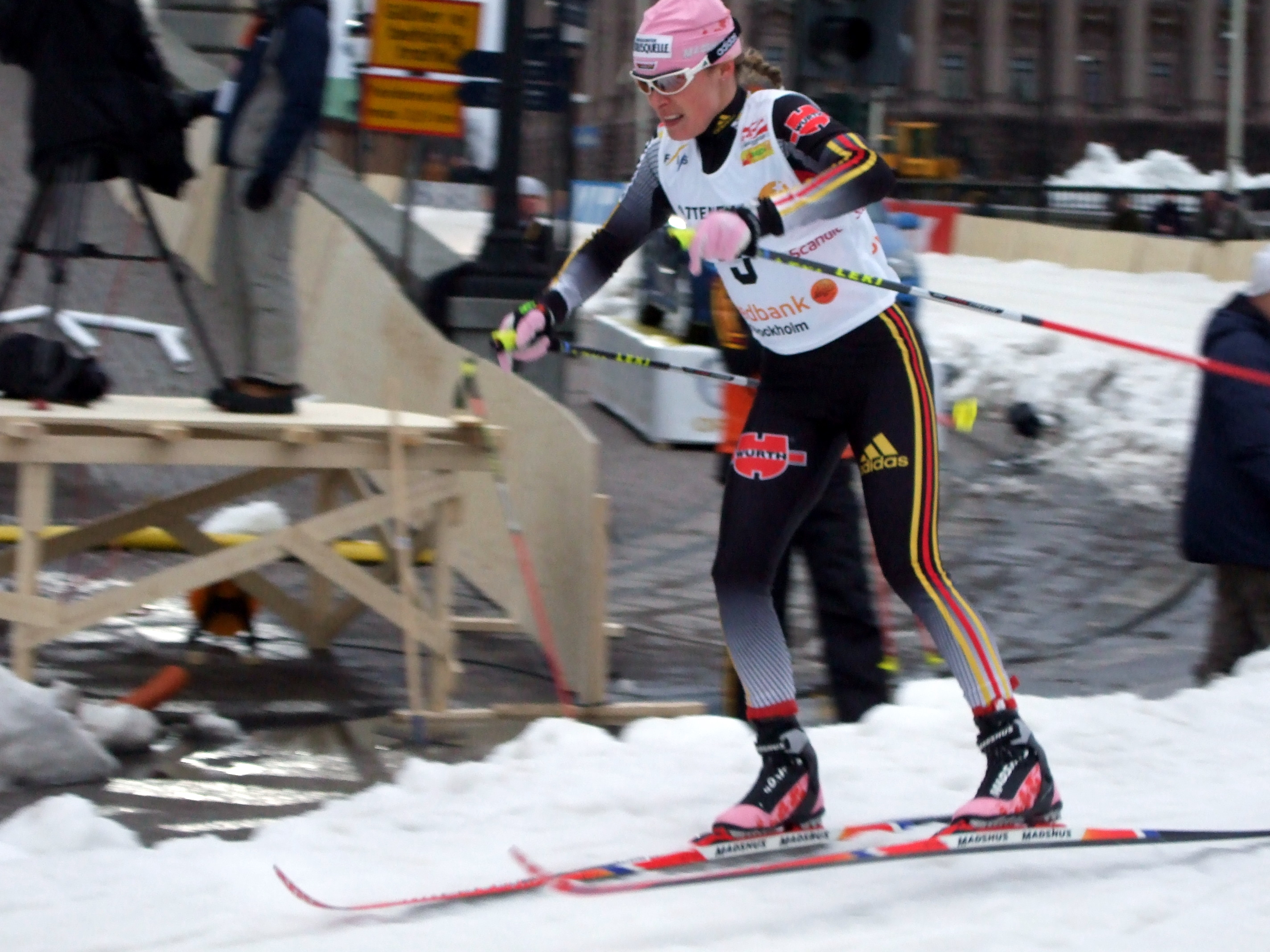
- Sachenbacher-Stehle in Stockholm, 2007

Personal information
- Nationality: Germany
- Born: 27 November 1980 (age 45) Traunstein, West Germany
- Height: 162 cm (5 ft 4 in)

Sport
- Sport: Skiing
- Club: WSV Reit im Winkl

World Cup career
- Seasons: 14 – (1999–2011, 2014)
- Indiv. starts: 228
- Indiv. podiums: 12
- Indiv. wins: 3
- Team starts: 42
- Team podiums: 25
- Team wins: 7
- Overall titles: 0 – (4th in 2003, 2006)
- Discipline titles: 0
Medal record
Women's cross-country skiing
Representing Germany
International nordic ski competitions
Event	1st	2nd	3rd
Olympic Games	2	3	0
World Championships	1	4	1
Total	3	7	1
Olympic Games
Gold medal – first place	2002 Salt Lake City	4 × 5 km relay
Gold medal – first place	2010 Vancouver	Team sprint
Silver medal – second place	2002 Salt Lake City	Individual sprint
Silver medal – second place	2006 Turin	4 × 5 km relay
Silver medal – second place	2010 Vancouver	4 × 5 km relay
World Championships
Gold medal – first place	2003 Val di Fiemme	4 × 5 km relay
Silver medal – second place	2003 Val di Fiemme	10 km double pursuit
Silver medal – second place	2007 Sapporo	Team sprint
Silver medal – second place	2007 Sapporo	4 × 5 km relay
Silver medal – second place	2009 Liberec	4 × 5 km relay
Bronze medal – third place	1999 Ramsau	4 × 5 km relay
Junior World Championships
Gold medal – first place	2000 Štrbské Pleso	15 km classical
Silver medal – second place	1999 Saalfelden	4 × 5 km relay
Bronze medal – third place	1999 Saalfelden	15 km freestyle
Bronze medal – third place	2000 Štrbské Pleso	5 km freestyle

Evi Sachenbacher-Stehle (German pronunciation: [ˈeːfi ˈzaxənbaxɐˈʃteːlə]; born 27 November 1980) is a retired German cross-country skier and biathlete from Reit im Winkl who has competed since 1998. She was born in Traunstein, West Germany. Competing in three Winter Olympics, she won five medals with two golds (Team sprint: 2010, 4 × 5 km relay: 2002) and three silvers (Individual sprint: 2002, 4 × 5 km relay: 2006, 2010).

Sachenbacher-Stehle has also won six medals at the FIS Nordic World Ski Championships with a gold (4 × 5 km relay: 2003) and four silvers (5 km + 5 km double pursuit: 2003, team sprint: 2007 with Claudia Künzel-Nystad, 4 × 5 km relay: 2009) and a bronze. She also has fourteen individual victories at various levels in distances up to 5 km in her career from 1998 to 2006.

She received a five-day suspension at the beginning of the 2006 Winter Olympics due to a high hemoglobin level. She was one of twelve athletes given five-day suspensions for health reasons – the International Ski Federation decided they could not safely compete due to an abnormally high red blood cell counts.

From the 2012/2013 season, she switched to biathlon, citing motivational problems, and was given a slot in the German B-team. Members of the B-team are eligible to compete in IBU Cup races. Her results in the IBU-Cup made her eligible to compete in the Biathlon World Cup. In her first World Cup race, on 14 December 2012 in Pokljuka, Sachenbacher-Stehle finished 59th. On 6 January 2013 she achieved the first IBU Cup podium, finishing second in the 7.5 km sprint in Otepää. As of January 2014, her best individual performance in a World Cup race remains sixth place in 7.5 km sprint in Sochi on 10 March 2013. She finished fourth in the 12.5 kilometre mass start biathlon competition of the Sochi 2014 Olympic Games on 17 February 2014.

On 21 February 2014, it was confirmed that Sachenbacher-Stehle had tested positive for methylhexanamine during the Sochi Olympic Games. She was stripped of her Olympic accreditation, and her results were annulled. In July 2014, she was banned for two years for doping. In November 2014 it was announced that the Court of Arbitration for Sport had ruled that her ban should be cut to six months after she appealed, on the grounds that her failed test was due to contamination of food supplements. However shortly afterwards she announced her retirement from the sport in an interview on the television programme Sportschau.

She married German alpine skier Johannes Stehle in July 2005.

== Cross-country skiing results ==
All results are sourced from the International Ski Federation (FIS).

=== Olympic Games ===
- 5 medals – (2 gold, 3 silver)

Year	Age	10 km	15 km	Pursuit	30 km	Sprint	4 × 5 km relay	Team sprint
2002	21	—	18	12	—	Silver	Gold	—N/a
2006	25	20	—N/a	—	13	—	Silver	5
2010	29	12	—N/a	11	4	—	Silver	Gold

=== World Championships ===
- 6 medals – (1 gold, 4 silver, 1 bronze)

Year	Age	5 km	10 km	15 km	Pursuit	30 km	Sprint	4 × 5 km relay	Team sprint
1999	18	23	—N/a	—	25	—	—N/a	Bronze	—N/a
2001	20	—N/a	—	31	—	CNX^{[a]}	—	—	—N/a
2003	22	—N/a	—	—	Silver	6	5	Gold	—N/a
2005	24	—N/a	17	—N/a	—	—	—	4	—
2007	26	—N/a	6	—N/a	4	—	—	Silver	Silver
2009	28	—N/a	—	—N/a	13	DNS	—	Silver	7
2011	30	—N/a	—	—N/a	13	13	—	—	5

a. ^{1} Cancelled due to extremely cold weather.

=== World Cup ===
==== Season standings ====
Season	Age	Discipline standings					Ski Tour standings		
Season	Age	Overall	Distance	Long Distance	Middle Distance	Sprint	Nordic Opening	Tour de Ski	World Cup Final
1999	19	44	—N/a	40	—N/a	51	—N/a	—N/a	—N/a
2000	20	29	—N/a	48	54	38	—N/a	—N/a	—N/a
2001	21	43	—N/a	—N/a	—N/a	41	—N/a	—N/a	—N/a
2002	22	16	—N/a	—N/a	—N/a	4	—N/a	—N/a	—N/a
2003	23	4	—N/a	—N/a	—N/a	9	—N/a	—N/a	—N/a
2004	24	11	12	—N/a	—N/a	13	—N/a	—N/a	—N/a
2005	25	14	13	—N/a	—N/a	31	—N/a	—N/a	—N/a
2006	26	4	5	—N/a	—N/a	19	—N/a	—N/a	—N/a
2007	27	9	14	—N/a	—N/a	18	—N/a	8	—N/a
2008	28	10	10	—N/a	—N/a	11	—N/a	8	17
2009	29	17	17	—N/a	—N/a	29	—N/a	DNF	8
2010	30	16	13	—N/a	—N/a	39	—N/a	DNF	13
2011	31	60	40	—N/a	—N/a	NC	DNF	—	—
2014	34	NC	NC	—N/a	—N/a	—	—	DNF	—

==== Individual podiums ====
- 3 victories – (3 WC)
- 12 podiums – (12 WC)

No.	Season	Date	Location	Race	Level	Place
1	2001–02	27 December 2001	Garmisch-Partenkirchen, Germany	0.7 km Sprint F	World Cup	1st
2	2002–03	23 November 2002	Kiruna, Sweden	5 km F Individual	World Cup	1st
3	2002–03	12 February 2003	Reit im Winkl, Germany	1.0 km Sprint F	World Cup	2nd
4	2002–03	22 March 2003	Falun, Sweden	5 km + 5 km C/F Pursuit	World Cup	2nd
5	2003–04	29 November 2003	Rukatunturi, Finland	7.5 km + 7.5 km C/F Pursuit	World Cup	3rd
6	2003–04	24 February 2004	Trondheim, Norway	1.5 km Sprint F	World Cup	2nd
7	2005–06	15 December 2005	Canmore, Canada	10 km F Individual	World Cup	3rd
8	2005–06	8 March 2006	Falun, Sweden	5 km + 5 km C/F Pursuit	World Cup	1st
9	2005–06	11 March 2006	Oslo, Norway	30 km F Mass Start	World Cup	3rd
10	2005–06	19 March 2006	Sapporo, Japan	7.5 km + 7.5 km C/F Pursuit	World Cup	3rd
11	2007–08	1 March 2008	Lahti, Finland	1.2 km Sprint F	World Cup	3rd
12	2009–10	1 March 2008	Rybinsk, Russia	7.5 km + 7.5 km C/F Pursuit	World Cup	2nd

==== Team podiums ====
- 7 victories – (4 RL, 3 TS)
- 25 podiums – (19 RL, 6 TS)

No.	Season	Date	Location	Race	Level	Place	Teammate(s)
1	1998–99	26 February 1999	Ramsau, Austria	4 × 5 km Relay C/F	World Championships^{[1]}	3rd	Bauer / Roth / Wille
2	2001–02	10 March 2002	Falun, Sweden	4 × 5 km Relay C/F	World Cup	3rd	Henkel / Bauer / Künzel
3	2002–03	24 November 2002	Kiruna, Sweden	4 × 5 km Relay C/F	World Cup	2nd	Henkel / Bauer / Künzel
4	2002–03	8 December 2002	Davos, Switzerland	4 × 5 km Relay C/F	World Cup	3rd	Henkel / Bauer / Künzel
5	2002–03	19 January 2003	Nové Město, Czech Republic	4 × 5 km Relay C/F	World Cup	1st	Bauer / Henkel / Künzel
6	2002–03	19 January 2003	Asiago, Italy	6 × 1.4 km Team Sprint F	World Cup	1st	Künzel
7	2002–03	23 March 2003	Falun, Sweden	4 × 5 km Relay C/F	World Cup	1st	Henkel / Bauer / Künzel
8	2003–04	23 November 2003	Beitostølen, Norway	4 × 5 km Relay C/F	World Cup	2nd	Henkel / Böhler / Künzel
9	2003–04	7 December 2003	Dobbiaco, Italy	6 × 0.8 km Team Sprint F	World Cup	2nd	Künzel
10	2003–04	14 December 2003	Davos, Switzerland	4 × 5 km Relay C/F	World Cup	2nd	Böhler / Henkel / Künzel
11	2003–04	11 January 2004	Otepää, Estonia	4 × 5 km Relay C/F	World Cup	2nd	Henkel / Bauer / Künzel
12	2003–04	15 February 2004	Oberstdorf, Germany	6 × 0.8 km Team Sprint F	World Cup	2nd	Künzel
13	2004–05	24 November 2004	Düsseldorf, Germany	6 × 0.8 km Team Sprint F	World Cup	2nd	Henkel
14	2004–05	21 November 2004	Gällivare, Sweden	4 × 5 km Relay C/F	World Cup	3rd	Böhler / Reschwam Schulze / Künzel
15	2004–05	12 December 2004	Lago di Tesero, Italy	4 × 5 km Relay C/F	World Cup	2nd	Henkel / Künzel / Böhler
16	2005–06	20 November 2005	Beitostølen, Norway	4 × 5 km Relay C/F	World Cup	2nd	Henkel / Böhler / Künzel
17	2005–06	15 February 2004	Sapporo, Japan	6 × 0.8 km Team Sprint F	World Cup	1st	Künzel-Nystad
18	2006–07	19 November 2006	Gällivare, Sweden	4 × 5 km Relay C/F	World Cup	2nd	Henkel / Zeller / Künzel-Nystad
19	2006–07	17 December 2006	La Clusaz, France	4 × 5 km Relay C/F	World Cup	1st	Böhler / Bauer / Künzel-Nystad
20	2006–07	25 March 2007	Falun, Sweden	4 × 5 km Relay C/F	World Cup	1st	Bauer / Böhler / Künzel-Nystad
21	2007–08	25 November 2007	Beitostølen, Norway	4 × 5 km Relay C/F	World Cup	2nd	Böhler / Zeller / Künzel-Nystad
22	2007–08	9 December 2007	Davos, Switzerland	4 × 5 km Relay C/F	World Cup	2nd	Henkel / Zeller / Böhler
23	2007–08	24 February 2008	Falun, Sweden	4 × 5 km Relay C/F	World Cup	2nd	Böhler / Zeller / Künzel-Nystad
24	2009–10	1 March 2008	Rybinsk, Russia	6 × 0.8 km Team Sprint F	World Cup	1st	Böhler
25	2009–10	7 March 2010	Lahti, Finland	4 × 5 km Relay C/F	World Cup	2nd	Fessel / Zeller / Gössner

Note: ^{1} Until the 1999 World Championships, World Championship races were included in the World Cup scoring system.

==== Overall record ====
Result	Distance Races^{[a]}						Sprint	Ski Tours	Individual Events	Team Events		All Events
Result	≤ 5 km^{[b]}	≤ 10 km^{[b]}	≤ 15 km^{[b]}	≤ 30 km^{[b]}	≥ 30 km^{[b]}	Pursuit^{[c]}	Sprint	Ski Tours	Individual Events	Team Sprint	Relay	All Events
1st place	1	–	–	–	–	1	1	–	3	3	4	10
2nd place	–	–	–	–	–	2	2	–	4	3	10	17
3rd place	–	1	–	1	–	2	1	–	5	–	5	10
Podiums	1	1	–	1	–	5	4	–	12	6	19	37
Top 10	4	22	7	9	–	17	19	3	81	12	28	121
Points	13	61	17	11	–	27	63	4	196	14	29	239
Others	5	8	1	1	–	2	14	–	31	–	–	31
DNF	–	–	1	–	–	–	–	4	5	–	–	5
Starts	18	69	19	12	–	29	77	8	232	14	29	275

a. ^{1} Classification is made according to FIS classification.
b. ^{1} ^{2} ^{3} ^{4} ^{5} Includes individual and mass start races.
c. ^{1} Includes pursuit and double pursuit races.

Note: Until 1999 World Championships, World Championship races are part of the World Cup. Hence results from the 1999 World Championships are included in the World Cup overall record.

== Biathlon results ==
=== Olympic Games ===
Event	Individual	Sprint	Pursuit	Mass start	Relay	Mixed relay
(Russia) 2014 Sochi	20th	11th	27th	DSQ	—	DSQ
