= FIS Nordic World Ski Championships 2009 – Women's 4 × 5 kilometre relay =

Women's 4 × 5 kilometre relay at the FIS Nordic World Ski Championships 2009
- Venue: Liberec
- Date: 26 February 2009
- Competitors: 60 from 15 nations
- Teams: 15
- Winning time: 54:24.3

Medalists
gold medal	Pirjo Muranen; Virpi Kuitunen; Riitta-Liisa Roponen; Aino-Kaisa Saarinen	Finland
silver medal	Katrin Zeller; Evi Sachenbacher-Stehle; Miriam Gössner; Claudia Nystad	Germany
bronze medal	Lina Andersson; Britta Johansson Norgren; Anna Haag; Charlotte Kalla	Sweden

The Women's 4 × 5 kilometre relay at the FIS Nordic World Ski Championships 2009 was held on 26 February 2009 at 13:00 CET. The defending world champions were the Finnish team of Virpi Kuitunen, Aino-Kaisa Saarinen, Riitta-Liisa Roponen and Pirjo Manninen.

== Results ==
Rank	Bib	Country	Athlete	Time	Deficit
1st place, gold medalist(s)	1	Finland	Pirjo Muranen; Virpi Kuitunen; Riitta-Liisa Roponen; Aino-Kaisa Saarinen	54:24.3; 14:11.2; 13:57.2; 13:41.2; 12:34.7	—
2nd place, silver medalist(s)	2	Germany	Katrin Zeller; Evi Sachenbacher-Stehle; Miriam Gössner; Claudia Nystad	54:37.3; 14:34.7; 14:44.9; 12:37.9; 12:39.8	+13.0
3rd place, bronze medalist(s)	4	Sweden	Lina Andersson; Britta Johansson Norgren; Anna Haag; Charlotte Kalla	54:37.7; 14:33.0; 14:38.6; 13:09.3; 12:16.8	+13.4
4	3	Norway	Marit Bjørgen; Therese Johaug; Kristin Størmer Steira; Marthe Kristoffersen	54:40.4; 14:19.9; 14:20.3; 13:01.2; 12:59.0	+16.1
5	6	Italy	Antonella Confortola Wyatt; Marianna Longa; Sabina Valbusa; Arianna Follis	55:16.8; 15:13.0; 14:07.7; 13:19.7; 12:36.4	+52.5
6	15	Poland	Justyna Kowalczyk; Kornelia Marek; Sylwia Jaśkowiec; Paulina Maciuszek	55:36.4; 14:06.9; 15:07.6; 12:42.2; 13:39.7	+1:12.1
7	8	Japan	Madoka Natsumi; Masako Ishida; Michito Kashiwabara; Nobuko Fukuda	55:40.4; 14:43.5; 14:07.1; 13:28.9; 13:20.9	+1:16.1
8	14	France	Élodie Bourgeois-Pin; Karine Laurent Philippot; Coraline Hugue; Célia Bourgeois	56:04.4; 15:14.8; 14:31.4; 13:08.1; 13:10.1	+1:40.1
9	11	Belarus	Olga Vasiljonok; Alena Sannikova; Ekaterina Rudakova; Viktoria Lopatina	56:49.1; 15:15.4; 14:33.9; 13:38.7; 13:21.1	+2:24.8
10	9	Kazakhstan	Tatyana Roshchina; Elena Kolomina; Svetlana Malakhova-Shishkina; Oxana Yatskaya	56:55.7; 15:57.3; 14:47.5; 13:12.4; 12:58.5	+2:31.4
11	10	Ukraine	Vita Yakymchuk; Lada Nesterenko; Maryna Antsybor; Valentyna Shevchenko	57:19.1; 15:33.0; 15:36.3; 13:26.7; 12:43.1	+2:54.8
12	5	Czech Republic	Eva Skalníková; Kamila Rajdlová; Ivana Janečková; Helena Erbenová	57:33.4; 16:16.7; 14:30.9; 13:26.3; 13:19.5	+3:09.1
13	12	United States	Kikkan Randall; Morgan Arritola; Elizabeth Stephen; Caitlin Compton	57:40.7; 14:34.1; 15:11.3; 13:25.2; 14:30.1	+3:16.4
14	13	Estonia	Kaija Udras; Triin Ojaste; Tatjana Mannima; Kaili Sirge	58:10.0; 15:12.7; 15:02.7; 14:05.9; 13:48.7	+3:45.7
	7	Russia	Alyona Sidko; Olga Rocheva; Yuliya Chepalova; Yevgeniya Medvedeva	DSQ	—
