= 2009–10 FIS Cross-Country World Cup =

Cross-country skiing competition

Discipline	Men	Women
Overall	(Norway) Petter Northug	(Poland) Justyna Kowalczyk (2nd title)
Distance	(Norway) Petter Northug	(Poland) Justyna Kowalczyk
Sprint	(Sweden) Emil Jönsson	(Poland) Justyna Kowalczyk
Nations Cup	Norway	Norway
- Nations Cup Overall: Norway

Stage events
Tour de Ski	(Czech Republic) Lukáš Bauer	(Poland) Justyna Kowalczyk
World Cup Final	(Norway) Petter Northug	(Norway) Marit Bjørgen

Competition
Locations	18 venues	18 venues
Individual	30 events	30 events
Relay/Team	4 events	4 events

The 2009–10 FIS Cross-Country World Cup was a multi-race tournament over the season for cross-country skiers. It was the 29th official World Cup season in cross-country skiing for men and women. The season started 21 November 2009 in Beitostølen, Norway and ended on 21 March 2010 in Falun, Sweden. The World Cup was organised by the FIS who also run world cups and championships in ski jumping, snowboarding and alpine skiing amongst others. A new website was created by the FIS for Cross-country skiing fan that was released the week of 16 November 2009.

== Calendar ==
Both men's and women's events tended to be held at the same resorts over a 2 or 3 day period. Listed below is a list of races which equates with the points table further down this page.

The Tour de Ski was a series of events which count towards the World Cup. This started in Oberhof and ended in Val di Fiemme.

=== Men ===
Key: C – Classic / F – Freestyle
WC	Stage	Date	Place	Discipline	Winner	Second	Third	Yellow bib	Ref.
1	1	21 November 2009	(Norway) Beitostølen	15 km F	(Norway) Ronny Hafsås	(France) Vincent Vittoz	(Finland) Matti Heikkinen	(Norway) Ronny Hafsås	
2	2	28 November 2009	(Finland) Ruka	Sprint C	(Norway) Ola Vigen Hattestad	(Norway) Øystein Pettersen	(Russia) Nikita Kryukov	(Norway) Hafsås/Hattestad	
3	3	29 November 2009	(Finland) Ruka	15 km C	(Norway) Petter Northug	(Russia) Maxim Vylegzhanin	(Russia) Alexander Legkov	(Norway) Petter Northug	
4	4	5 December 2009	(Germany) Düsseldorf	Sprint F	(Russia) Alexey Petukhov	(Norway) Anders Gløersen	(Norway) Eirik Brandsdal	(Norway) Petter Northug	
5	5	12 December 2009	(Switzerland) Davos	15 km F	(Finland) Matti Heikkinen	(Sweden) Marcus Hellner	(France) Maurice Manificat	(Finland) Matti Heikkinen	
6	6	13 December 2009	(Switzerland) Davos	Sprint F	(Norway) John Kristian Dahl	(Norway) Petter Northug	(Russia) Alexey Petukhov	(Norway) Petter Northug	
7	7	19 December 2009	(Slovenia) Rogla	Sprint C	(Norway) Petter Northug	(Germany) Tobias Angerer	(Sweden) Jesper Modin	(Norway) Petter Northug	
8	8	20 December 2009	(Slovenia) Rogla	30 km C Mass Start	(Norway) Petter Northug	(Russia) Alexander Legkov	(Russia) Maxim Vylegzhanin	(Norway) Petter Northug	
	9	1 January 2010	(Germany) Oberhof	3.75 km F Prologue	(Norway) Petter Northug	(Sweden) Marcus Hellner	(Germany) Axel Teichmann	(Norway) Petter Northug	
	10	2 January 2010	(Germany) Oberhof	15 km C Pursuit	(Norway) Petter Northug	(Russia) Maxim Vylegzhanin	(Finland) Matti Heikkinen	(Norway) Petter Northug	
	11	3 January 2010	(Germany) Oberhof	Sprint C	(Norway) Eldar Rønning	(Norway) Petter Northug	(Germany) Axel Teichmann	(Norway) Petter Northug	
	12	4 January 2010	(Czech Republic) Prague	Sprint F	(Sweden) Emil Jönsson	(Sweden) Marcus Hellner	(Norway) Simen Østensen	(Norway) Petter Northug	
	13	6 January 2010	(Italy) Cortina d'Ampezzo-Toblach	35 km F Pursuit	(Norway) Petter Northug	(Switzerland) Dario Cologna	(Sweden) Marcus Hellner	(Norway) Petter Northug	
	14	7 January 2010	(Italy) Toblach	10 km C	(Sweden) Daniel Rickardsson	(Czech Republic) Lukáš Bauer	(Norway) Petter Northug	(Norway) Petter Northug	
	15	9 January 2010	(Italy) Val di Fiemme	20 km C Mass Start	(Czech Republic) Lukáš Bauer	(Norway) Petter Northug	(Germany) Axel Teichmann	(Norway) Petter Northug	
	16	10 January 2010	(Italy) Val di Fiemme	10 km F Final Climb	(Czech Republic) Lukáš Bauer	(Sweden) Marcus Hellner	(France) Jean-Marc Gaillard	(Norway) Petter Northug	
9	4th Tour de Ski Overall (1–10 January 2010)				(Czech Republic) Lukáš Bauer	(Norway) Petter Northug	(Switzerland) Dario Cologna	(Norway) Petter Northug	
10	17	16 January 2010	(Estonia) Otepää	15 km C	(Czech Republic) Lukáš Bauer	(Estonia) Andrus Veerpalu	(Estonia) Jaak Mae	(Norway) Petter Northug	
11	18	17 January 2010	(Estonia) Otepää	Sprint C	(Sweden) Emil Jönsson	(Norway) Ola Vigen Hattestad	(Russia) Nikita Kryukov	(Norway) Petter Northug	
12	19	22 January 2010	(Russia) Rybinsk	Sprint F	(Russia) Nikolay Morilov	(Russia) Alexey Petukhov	(Russia) Nikita Kryukov	(Norway) Petter Northug	
13	20	23 January 2010	(Russia) Rybinsk	30 km Skiathlon	(Russia) Artem Zhmurko	(Russia) Ilia Chernousov	(Russia) Sergey Shiryayev	(Norway) Petter Northug	
14	21	5 February 2010	(Canada) Canmore	15 km F	(Italy) Giorgio Di Centa	(Italy) Pietro Piller Cottrer	(Switzerland) Dario Cologna	(Norway) Petter Northug	
15	22	6 February 2010	(Canada) Canmore	Sprint C	(Sweden) Emil Jönsson	(Norway) John Kristian Dahl	(Switzerland) Dario Cologna	(Norway) Petter Northug	
2010 Winter Olympics (12–28 February)
16	23	6 March 2010	(Finland) Lahti	30 km Skiathlon	(France) Maurice Manificat	(Czech Republic) Lukáš Bauer	(Russia) Ilia Chernousov	(Norway) Petter Northug	
17	24	11 March 2010	(Norway) Drammen	Sprint C	(Sweden) Emil Jönsson	(Norway) Petter Northug	(United States) Andrew Newell	(Norway) Petter Northug	
18	25	13 March 2010	(Norway) Oslo	50 km F Mass Start	(Norway) Petter Northug	(Italy) Pietro Piller Cottrer	(France) Vincent Vittoz	(Norway) Petter Northug	
19	26	14 March 2010	(Norway) Oslo	Sprint F	(Norway) Anders Gløersen	(Russia) Alexey Petukhov	(Sweden) Marcus Hellner	(Norway) Petter Northug	
	27	17 March 2010	(Sweden) Stockholm	Sprint C	(Russia) Nikita Kryukov	(Norway) Petter Northug	(Sweden) Emil Jönsson	(Norway) Petter Northug	
	28	19 March 2010	(Sweden) Falun	3.3 km C	(Switzerland) Dario Cologna	(Sweden) Mats Larsson	(Russia) Maxim Vylegzhanin	(Norway) Petter Northug	
	29	20 March 2010	(Sweden) Falun	20 km Skiathlon	(Norway) Petter Northug	(Germany) Tobias Angerer	(Czech Republic) Lukáš Bauer	(Norway) Petter Northug	
	30	21 March 2010	(Sweden) Falun	15 km F Pursuit	(France) Maurice Manificat	(Russia) Maxim Vylegzhanin	(France) Vincent Vittoz	(Norway) Petter Northug	
20	2009–10 World Cup Final (17–21 March 2010)				(Norway) Petter Northug	(France) Maurice Manificat	(Sweden) Marcus Hellner	(Norway) Petter Northug	

=== Women ===
Key: C – Classic / F – Freestyle
WC	Stage	Date	Place	Discipline	Winner	Second	Third	Yellow bib	Ref.
1	1	21 November 2009	(Norway) Beitostølen	10 km F	(Norway) Marit Bjørgen	(Sweden) Charlotte Kalla	(Sweden) Anna Haag	(Norway) Marit Bjørgen	
2	2	28 November 2009	(Finland) Ruka	Sprint C	(Poland) Justyna Kowalczyk	(Slovenia) Petra Majdič	(Slovakia) Alena Procházková	(Poland) Justyna Kowalczyk	
3	3	29 November 2009	(Finland) Ruka	10 km C	(Finland) Aino-Kaisa Saarinen	(Russia) Irina Khazova	(Norway) Vibeke Skofterud	(Finland) Aino-Kaisa Saarinen	
4	4	5 December 2009	(Germany) Düsseldorf	Sprint F	(Sweden) Hanna Falk	(Russia) Natalya Korostelyova	(Slovenia) Vesna Fabjan	(Finland) Aino-Kaisa Saarinen	
5	5	12 December 2009	(Switzerland) Davos	10 km F	(Russia) Irina Khazova	(Sweden) Charlotte Kalla	(Estonia) Kristina Šmigun-Vähi	(Russia) Irina Khazova	
6	6	13 December 2009	(Switzerland) Davos	Sprint F	(Slovenia) Petra Majdič	(Norway) Marit Bjørgen	(Finland) Aino-Kaisa Saarinen	(Slovenia) Petra Majdič	
7	7	19 December 2009	(Slovenia) Rogla	Sprint C	(Norway) Marit Bjørgen	(Poland) Justyna Kowalczyk	(Slovenia) Petra Majdič	(Norway) Marit Bjørgen	
8	8	20 December 2009	(Slovenia) Rogla	15 km C Mass Start	(Poland) Justyna Kowalczyk	(Norway) Marit Bjørgen	(Sweden) Anna Haag	(Norway) Marit Bjørgen	
	9	1 January 2010	(Germany) Oberhof	2.5 km F Prologue	(Slovenia) Petra Majdič	(Russia) Natalya Korostelyova	(Poland) Justyna Kowalczyk	(Norway) Marit Bjørgen	
	10	2 January 2010	(Germany) Oberhof	10 km C Pursuit	(Poland) Justyna Kowalczyk	(Finland) Aino-Kaisa Saarinen	(Norway) Kristin Størmer Steira	(Poland) Justyna Kowalczyk	
	11	3 January 2010	(Germany) Oberhof	Sprint C	(Slovenia) Petra Majdič	(Poland) Justyna Kowalczyk	(Finland) Aino-Kaisa Saarinen	(Poland) Justyna Kowalczyk	
	12	4 January 2010	(Czech Republic) Prague	Sprint F	(Russia) Natalya Korostelyova	(Norway) Celine Brun-Lie	(Slovakia) Alena Procházková	(Poland) Justyna Kowalczyk	
	13	6 January 2010	(Italy) Toblach	16 km F Pursuit	(Italy) Arianna Follis	(Slovenia) Petra Majdič	(Poland) Justyna Kowalczyk	(Poland) Justyna Kowalczyk	
	14	7 January 2010	(Italy) Toblach	5 km C	(Poland) Justyna Kowalczyk	(Finland) Aino-Kaisa Saarinen	(Slovenia) Petra Majdič	(Poland) Justyna Kowalczyk	
	15	9 January 2010	(Italy) Val di Fiemme	10 km C Mass Start	(Slovenia) Petra Majdič	(Kazakhstan) Elena Kolomina	(Italy) Marianna Longa	(Slovenia) Petra Majdič	
	16	10 January 2010	(Italy) Val di Fiemme	9 km F Final Climb	(Norway) Kristin Størmer Steira	(Finland) Riitta-Liisa Roponen	(Russia) Yevgeniya Medvedeva	(Slovenia) Petra Majdič	
9	4th Tour de Ski Overall (1–10 January 2010)				(Poland) Justyna Kowalczyk	(Slovenia) Petra Majdič	(Italy) Arianna Follis	(Poland) Justyna Kowalczyk	
10	17	16 January 2010	(Estonia) Otepää	10 km C	(Poland) Justyna Kowalczyk	(Norway) Marit Bjørgen	(Finland) Aino-Kaisa Saarinen	(Poland) Justyna Kowalczyk	
11	18	17 January 2010	(Estonia) Otepää	Sprint C	(Sweden) Hanna Falk	(Slovenia) Petra Majdič	(Finland) Aino-Kaisa Saarinen	(Poland) Justyna Kowalczyk	
12	19	22 January 2010	(Russia) Rybinsk	Sprint F	(Slovenia) Vesna Fabjan	(Italy) Magda Genuin	(Poland) Justyna Kowalczyk	(Poland) Justyna Kowalczyk	
13	20	23 January 2010	(Russia) Rybinsk	15 km Skiathlon	(Poland) Justyna Kowalczyk	(Germany) Evi Sachenbacher-Stehle	(Russia) Olga Schuchkina	(Poland) Justyna Kowalczyk	
14	21	5 February 2010	(Canada) Canmore	10 km F	(Sweden) Charlotte Kalla	(Poland) Justyna Kowalczyk	(Russia) Irina Khazova	(Poland) Justyna Kowalczyk	
15	22	6 February 2010	(Canada) Canmore	Sprint C	(Poland) Justyna Kowalczyk	(Sweden) Ida Ingemarsdotter	(Canada) Sara Renner	(Poland) Justyna Kowalczyk	
2010 Winter Olympics (12–28 February)
16	23	6 March 2010	(Finland) Lahti	15 km Skiathlon	(Norway) Marit Bjørgen	(Poland) Justyna Kowalczyk	(Norway) Therese Johaug	(Poland) Justyna Kowalczyk	
17	24	11 March 2010	(Norway) Drammen	Sprint C	(Norway) Marit Bjørgen	(Finland) Aino-Kaisa Saarinen	(Finland) Pirjo Muranen	(Poland) Justyna Kowalczyk	
18	25	13 March 2010	(Norway) Oslo	30 km F Mass Start	(Norway) Marit Bjørgen	(Norway) Kristin Størmer Steira	(Norway) Therese Johaug	(Poland) Justyna Kowalczyk	
19	26	14 March 2010	(Norway) Oslo	Sprint F	(Norway) Marit Bjørgen	(United States) Kikkan Randall	(Russia) Natalya Korostelyova	(Poland) Justyna Kowalczyk	
	27	17 March 2010	(Sweden) Stockholm	Sprint C	(Sweden) Anna Olsson	(Poland) Justyna Kowalczyk	(Norway) Marit Bjørgen	(Poland) Justyna Kowalczyk	
	28	19 March 2010	(Sweden) Falun	2.5 km C	(Poland) Justyna Kowalczyk	(Norway) Marit Bjørgen	(Sweden) Charlotte Kalla	(Poland) Justyna Kowalczyk	
	29	20 March 2010	(Sweden) Falun	10 km Skiathlon	(Norway) Marit Bjørgen	(Norway) Kristin Størmer Steira	(Norway) Therese Johaug	(Poland) Justyna Kowalczyk	
	30	21 March 2010	(Sweden) Falun	10 km F Pursuit	(Sweden) Charlotte Kalla	(Norway) Kristin Størmer Steira	(Estonia) Kristina Šmigun-Vähi	(Poland) Justyna Kowalczyk	
20	2009–10 World Cup Final (17–21 March 2010)				(Norway) Marit Bjørgen	(Poland) Justyna Kowalczyk	(Sweden) Charlotte Kalla	(Poland) Justyna Kowalczyk	

=== Men's team ===
WC	Date	Place	Discipline	Winner	Second	Third	Ref.
1	22 November 2009	(Norway) Beitostølen	4 × 10 km relay C/F	Norway I Eldar Rønning; Martin Johnsrud Sundby; Ronny Hafsås; Petter Northug	Russia I Maxim Vylegzhanin; Nikolay Pankratov; Alexander Legkov; Ilia Chernousov	Germany Jens Filbrich; Axel Teichmann; René Sommerfeldt; Tobias Angerer	
2	6 December 2009	(Germany) Düsseldorf	Team Sprint F	Russia I Nikolay Morilov; Alexey Petukhov	Norway I Eirik Brandsdal; Anders Gløersen	Sweden II Robin Bryntesson; Björn Lind	
3	24 January 2010	(Russia) Rybinsk	Team Sprint F	Russia I Nikolay Morilov; Alexey Petukhov	Italy II Fabio Pasini; Loris Frasnelli	Germany Tim Tscharnke; Josef Wenzl	
4	7 March 2010	(Finland) Lahti	4 × 10 km relay C/F	Norway II Simen Østensen; Roger Aa Djupvik; Sjur Røthe; Kristian Tettli Rennemo	Norway I Eldar Rønning; Martin Johnsrud Sundby; Petter Eliassen; Tord Asle Gjerdalen	Germany Hannes Dotzler; Tobias Angerer; Philipp Marschall; Tim Tscharnke	

=== Women's team ===
WC	Date	Place	Discipline	Winner	Second	Third	Ref.
1	22 November 2009	(Norway) Beitostølen	4 × 5 km relay C/F	Sweden I Anna Olsson; Sara Lindborg; Anna Haag; Charlotte Kalla	Norway I Vibeke Skofterud; Therese Johaug; Kristin Størmer Steira; Marit Bjørgen	Finland Pirjo Muranen; Virpi Kuitunen; Riitta-Liisa Roponen; Aino-Kaisa Saarinen	
2	6 December 2009	(Germany) Düsseldorf	Team Sprint F	Italy I Magda Genuin; Arianna Follis	Sweden I Ida Ingemarsdotter; Hanna Falk	Norway I Celine Brun-Lie; Maiken Caspersen Falla	
3	24 January 2010	(Russia) Rybinsk	Team Sprint F	Germany I Stefanie Böhler; Evi Sachenbacher-Stehle	Slovenia Katja Višnar; Vesna Fabjan	Russia I Irina Khazova; Olga Rocheva	
4	7 March 2010	(Finland) Lahti	4 × 5 km relay C/F	Norway I Marthe Kristoffersen; Therese Johaug; Kristin Størmer Steira; Marit Bjørgen	Germany Nicole Fessel; Katrin Zeller; Miriam Gössner; Evi Sachenbacher-Stehle	Italy Marianna Longa; Antonella Confortola Wyatt; Sabina Valbusa; Arianna Follis	

== Men's standings ==
=== Overall ===
Rank	Athlete	Points
1	Petter Northug (NOR)	1621
2	Lukáš Bauer (CZE)	1021
3	Marcus Hellner (SWE)	985
4	Dario Cologna (SUI)	885
5	Maurice Manificat (FRA)	580
6	Emil Jönsson (SWE)	554
7	Axel Teichmann (GER)	541
8	Maxim Vylegzhanin (RUS)	532
9	Vincent Vittoz (FRA)	515
10	Giorgio Di Centa (ITA)	501

Rank	Athlete	Points
11	Jean-Marc Gaillard (FRA)	474
12	René Sommerfeldt (GER)	459
13	Matti Heikkinen (FIN)	443
14	Tobias Angerer (GER)	412
15	Eldar Rønning (NOR)	370
16	Pietro Piller Cottrer (ITA)	368
17	Daniel Rickardsson (SWE)	350
18	Alexey Petukhov (RUS)	347
19	Andrew Newell (USA)	313
20	Ola Vigen Hattestad (NOR)	312

Rank	Athlete	Points
21	Nikita Kriukov (RUS)	307
22	John Kristian Dahl (NOR)	296
23	Ivan Babikov (CAN)	295
24	Curdin Perl (SUI)	293
25	Nikolay Morilov (RUS)	286
26	Jesper Modin (SWE)	283
27	Jens Filbrich (GER)	275
28	Anders Gløersen (NOR)	274
29	Ilia Chernousov (RUS)	260
30	Alexander Legkov (RUS)	253

=== Distance ===
Rank	Athlete	Points
1	Petter Northug (NOR)	749
2	Lukáš Bauer (CZE)	563
3	Marcus Hellner (SWE)	483
4	Dario Cologna (SUI)	384
5	Vincent Vittoz (FRA)	373
6	Giorgio Di Centa (ITA)	340
7	Maxim Vylegzhanin (RUS)	337
8	Maurice Manificat (FRA)	334
9	Matti Heikkinen (FIN)	323
10	Axel Teichmann (GER)	319

=== Sprint ===
Rank	Athlete	Points
1	Emil Jönsson (SWE)	506
2	Petter Northug (NOR)	352
3	Alexey Petukhov (RUS)	347
4	Andrew Newell (USA)	313
5	Ola Vigen Hattestad (NOR)	312
6	Nikita Kriukov (RUS)	307
7	John Kristian Dahl (NOR)	296
8	Nikolay Morilov (RUS)	286
9	Anders Gløersen (NOR)	264
10	Jesper Modin (SWE)	232

== Women's standings ==
=== Overall ===
Rank	Athlete	Points
1	Justyna Kowalczyk (POL)	2064
2	Marit Bjørgen (NOR)	1320
3	Petra Majdič (SLO)	1191
4	Aino-Kaisa Saarinen (FIN)	1123
5	Arianna Follis (ITA)	908
6	Kristin Størmer Steira (NOR)	892
7	Riitta-Liisa Roponen (FIN)	788
8	Charlotte Kalla (SWE)	654
9	Marianna Longa (ITA)	646
10	Natalya Korostelyova (RUS)	488

Rank	Athlete	Points
11	Olga Zavyalova (RUS)	456
12	Marthe Kristoffersen (NOR)	432
13	Irina Khazova (RUS)	406
14	Anna Haag (SWE)	397
15	Ida Ingemarsdotter (SWE)	395
16	Evi Sachenbacher-Stehle (GER)	394
17	Vibeke Skofterud (NOR)	343
18	Therese Johaug (NOR)	372
19	Anna Olsson (SWE)	341
20	Hanna Falk (SWE)	338

Rank	Athlete	Points
21	Vesna Fabjan (SLO)	321
22	Virpi Kuitunen (FIN)	317
23	Katrin Zeller (GER)	311
24	Valentina Shevchenko (UKR)	310
25	Yevgeniya Medvedeva (RUS)	298
26	Riikka Sarasoja (FIN)	294
27	Yuliya Chekaleva (RUS)	284
28	Magda Genuin (ITA)	282
29	Karine Laurent Philippot (FRA)	278
30	Olga Rocheva (RUS)	275

=== Distance ===
Rank	Athlete	Points
1	Justyna Kowalczyk (POL)	929
2	Marit Bjørgen (NOR)	636
3	Kristin Størmer Steira (NOR)	568
4	Charlotte Kalla (SWE)	493
5	Riitta-Liisa Roponen (FIN)	477
6	Aino-Kaisa Saarinen (FIN)	466
7	Arianna Follis (ITA)	429
8	Petra Majdič (SLO)	425
9	Irina Khazova (RUS)	392
10	Marianna Longa (ITA)	383

=== Sprint ===
Rank	Athlete	Points
1	Justyna Kowalczyk (POL)	575
2	Marit Bjørgen (NOR)	484
3	Petra Majdič (SLO)	446
4	Aino-Kaisa Saarinen (FIN)	399
5	Hanna Falk (SWE)	338
6	Ida Ingemarsdotter (SWE)	336
7	Vesna Fabjan (SLO)	319
8	Natalya Korostelyova (RUS)	272
9	Magda Genuin (ITA)	215
10	Arianna Follis (ITA)	195

== Nations Cup ==
=== Overall ===
Rank	Nation	Points
1	Norway	9899
2	Russia	7701
3	Sweden	6793
4	Italy	4956
5	Finland	4748
6	Germany	4308
7	France	2477
8	Poland	2264
9	Switzerland	2013
10	Slovenia	1890

=== Men ===
Rank	Nation	Points
1	Norway	5249
2	Russia	4180
3	Sweden	3535
4	Germany	2453
5	Italy	2226
6	France	1864
7	Switzerland	1729
8	Finland	1543
9	Czech Republic	1335
10	Canada	848

=== Women ===
Rank	Nation	Points
1	Norway	4650
2	Russia	3521
3	Sweden	3258
4	Finland	3215
5	Italy	2730
6	Poland	2155
7	Slovenia	1890
8	Germany	1855
9	France	613
10	Kazakhstan	531

== Points distribution ==
The table shows the number of points won in the 2009–10 Cross-Country Skiing World Cup for men and women.

Place	1	2	3	4	5	6	7	8	9	10	11	12	13	14	15	16	17	18	19	20	21	22	23	24	25	26	27	28	29	30
Individual	100	80	60	50	45	40	36	32	29	26	24	22	20	18	16	15	14	13	12	11	10	9	8	7	6	5	4	3	2	1
Team Sprint	100	80	60	50	45	40	36	32	29	26	24	22	20	18	16	15	14	13	12	11	10	9	8	7	6	5	4	3	2	1
World Cup Final	200	160	120	100	90	80	72	64	58	52	48	44	40	36	32	30	28	26	24	22	20	18	16	14	12	10	8	6	4	2
Relay	200	160	120	100	90	80	72	64	58	52	48	44	40	36	32	30	28	26	24	22	20	18	16	14	12	10	8	6	4	2
Tour de Ski	400	320	240	200	180	160	144	128	116	104	96	88	80	72	64	60	56	52	48	44	40	36	32	28	24	20	16	12	8	4
Stage Tour de Ski	50	46	43	40	37	34	32	30	28	26	24	22	20	18	16	15	14	13	12	11	10	9	8	7	6	5	4	3	2	1
Stage World Cup Final	50	46	43	40	37	34	32	30	28	26	24	22	20	18	16	15	14	13	12	11	10	9	8	7	6	5	4	3	2	1

A skier's best results in all distance races and sprint races counts towards the overall World Cup totals.

All distance races, included individual stages in Tour de Ski and in World Cup Final (which counts as 50% of a normal race), count towards the distance standings. All sprint races, including the sprint races during the Tour de Ski and the first race of the World Cup final (which counts as 50% of a normal race), count towards the sprint standings.

The Nations Cup ranking is calculated by adding each country's individual competitors' scores and scores from team events. Relay events count double (see World Cup final positions), with only one team counting towards the total, while in team sprint events two teams contribute towards the total, with the usual World Cup points (100 to winning team, etc.) awarded.

== Achievements ==
First World Cup career victory

Men

- Ronny Hafsås (NOR), 24, in his 2nd season – the WC 1 (15 km F) in Beitostølen; also first podium
- John Kristian Dahl (NOR), 28, in his 10th season – the WC 6 (Sprint F) in Davos; first podium was 2003-04 WC 5 (Sprint C) in Val di Fiemme
- Daniel Rickardsson (SWE), 27, in his 8th season – the WC 14 (10 km C) in Toblach; also first podium
- Artem Zhmurko (RUS), 24, in his 4th season – the WC 20 (30 km Skiathlon) in Rybinsk; also first podium
- Maurice Manificat (FRA), 23, in his 4th season – the WC 23 (30 km Skiathlon) in Lahti; first podium was 2009-10 WC 5 (15 km F) in Davos
- Giorgio Di Centa (ITA), 37, in his 17th season – the WC 21 (15 km F) in Canmore; first podium was 1996-97 WC 8 (15 km F) in Hakuba
- Nikita Kryukov (RUS), 24, in his 5th season – the WC 27 (Sprint C) in Stockholm; first podium was 2009-10 WC 2 (Sprint C) in Ruka

Women

- Hanna Falk (SWE), 20, in her 2nd season – the WC 4 (Sprint F) in Düsseldorf; also first podium
- Irina Khazova (RUS), 25, in her 6th season – the WC 5 (10 km F) in Davos; first podium was 2009-10 WC 3 (10 km C) in Ruka
- Vesna Fabjan (SLO), 24, in her 6th season – the WC 19 (Sprint F) in Rybinsk

First World Cup podium

Men

- Ronny Hafsås (NOR), 24, in his 2nd season – no. 1 in the WC 1 (15 km F) in Beitostølen
- Maxim Vylegzhanin (RUS), 27, in his 6th season – no. 2 in the WC 3 (15 km C) in Ruka
- Daniel Rickardsson (SWE), 27, in his 8th season – no. 1 in the WC 14 (10 km C) in Toblach
- Artem Zhmurko (RUS), 24, in his 4th season – no. 1 in the WC 20 (30 km Skiathlon) in Rybinsk
- Maurice Manificat (FRA), 23, in his 4th season – no. 3 in the WC 5 (15 km F) in Davos

Women

- Irina Khazova (RUS), 25, in her 6th season – no. 2 in the WC 3 (10 km C) in Ruka
- Hanna Falk (SWE), 20, in her 2nd season – no. 1 in the WC 4 (Sprint F) in Düsseldorf
- Vesna Fabjan (SLO), 24, in her 6th season – no. 3 in the WC 4 (Sprint F) in Düsseldorf

Victories in this World Cup (all-time number of victories as of 2009/10 season in parentheses)

Men

- Petter Northug (NOR), 9 (15) first places
- Lukáš Bauer (CZE), 4 (15) first places
- Emil Jönsson (SWE), 4 (6) first places
- Maurice Manificat (FRA), 2 (2) first places
- Ola Vigen Hattestad (NOR), 1 (9) first place
- Eldar Rønning (NOR), 1 (7) first place
- Dario Cologna (SUI), 1 (5) first place
- Anders Gløersen (NOR), 1 (3) first place
- Alexey Petukhov (RUS), 1 (2) first place
- Nikolay Morilov (RUS), 1 (2) first place
- Ronny Hafsås (NOR), 1 (1) first place
- Matti Heikkinen (FIN), 1 (1) first place
- John Kristian Dahl (NOR), 1 (1) first place
- Daniel Rickardsson (SWE), 1 (1) first place
- Artem Zhmurko (RUS), 1 (1) first place
- Giorgio Di Centa (ITA), 1 (1) first place
- Nikita Kryukov (RUS), 1 (1) first place

Women

- Justyna Kowalczyk (POL), 9 (16) first places
- Marit Bjørgen (NOR), 8 (39) first places
- Petra Majdič (SLO), 4 (20) first places
- Charlotte Kalla (SWE), 2 (7) first places
- Hanna Falk (SWE), 2 (2) first places
- Arianna Follis (ITA), 1 (6) first place
- Kristin Størmer Steira (NOR), 1 (5) first place
- Aino-Kaisa Saarinen (FIN), 1 (4) first place
- Natalya Korostelyova (RUS), 1 (2) first place
- Anna Olsson (SWE), 1 (2) first place
- Irina Khazova (RUS), 1 (1) first place
- Vesna Fabjan (SLO), 1 (1) first place
