= FIS Nordic World Ski Championships 2009 – Women's team sprint =

Women's team sprint at the FIS Nordic World Ski Championships 2009
- Venue: Liberec
- Date: 25 February 2009
- Competitors: 34 from 17 nations
- Teams: 17
- Winning time: 19:43.7

Medalists
gold medal	Aino-Kaisa Saarinen; Virpi Kuitunen	Finland
silver medal	Anna Olsson; Lina Andersson	Sweden
bronze medal	Marianna Longa; Arianna Follis	Italy

The Women's team sprint took place on 25 February 2009. Team sprint qualifying at 11:00 CET and finals at 13:00 CET. The defending world champions were Finland's Riitta-Liisa Roponen and Virpi Kuitunen. Kuitunen defended her title with Aino-Kaisa Saarinen. The Finns led at every exchange until the last rounds at the finish to win by 20 seconds. This event was Saarinen's third medal at these championships. Anna Olsson earned her first championship medal while Andersson, Longa and Follis earned their second medals at these championships.

== Results ==
Q – Qualified for final round due to placing in heat
q – Qualified for final round due to times
PF – Placing decided by Photo finish

=== Semifinals ===
Qualification: First 3 in each heat (Q) and the next 6 fastest (q) advance to the final.

Semifinal 1

Rank	Heat	Bib	Country	Athletes	Time	Note

Semifinal 2

Rank	Heat	Bib	Country	Athletes	Time	Note

=== Final ===
Rank	Bib	Country	Athlete	Time	Deficit	Note
1st place, gold medalist(s)	1	Finland	Aino-Kaisa Saarinen; Virpi Kuitunen	19:43.7	—	
2nd place, silver medalist(s)	3	Sweden	Anna Olsson; Lina Andersson	20:03.7	+20.0	
3rd place, bronze medalist(s)	2	Italy	Marianna Longa; Arianna Follis	20:07.5	+23.8	
4	15	Japan	Masako Ishida; Madoka Natsumi	20:08.9	+25.2	
5	12	Norway	Astrid Uhrenholdt Jacobsen; Ingvild Flugstad Østberg	20:31.4	+47.7	
6	13	Canada	Sara Renner; Perianne Jones	20:47.3	+1:03.6	
7	4	Germany	Katrin Zeller; Evi Sachenbacher-Stehle	20:51.7	+1:08.0	
8	16	Kazakhstan	Oxana Yatskaya; Svetlana Shishkina	20:52.8	+1:09.1	
9	7	Czech Republic	Ivana Janečková; Kamila Rajdlová	21:37.9	+1:54.2	
—	10	Russia	Yevgeniya Shapovalova; Natalya Matveyeva	DSQ		
