= Nicole Fessel =

German cross-country skier (born 1983)

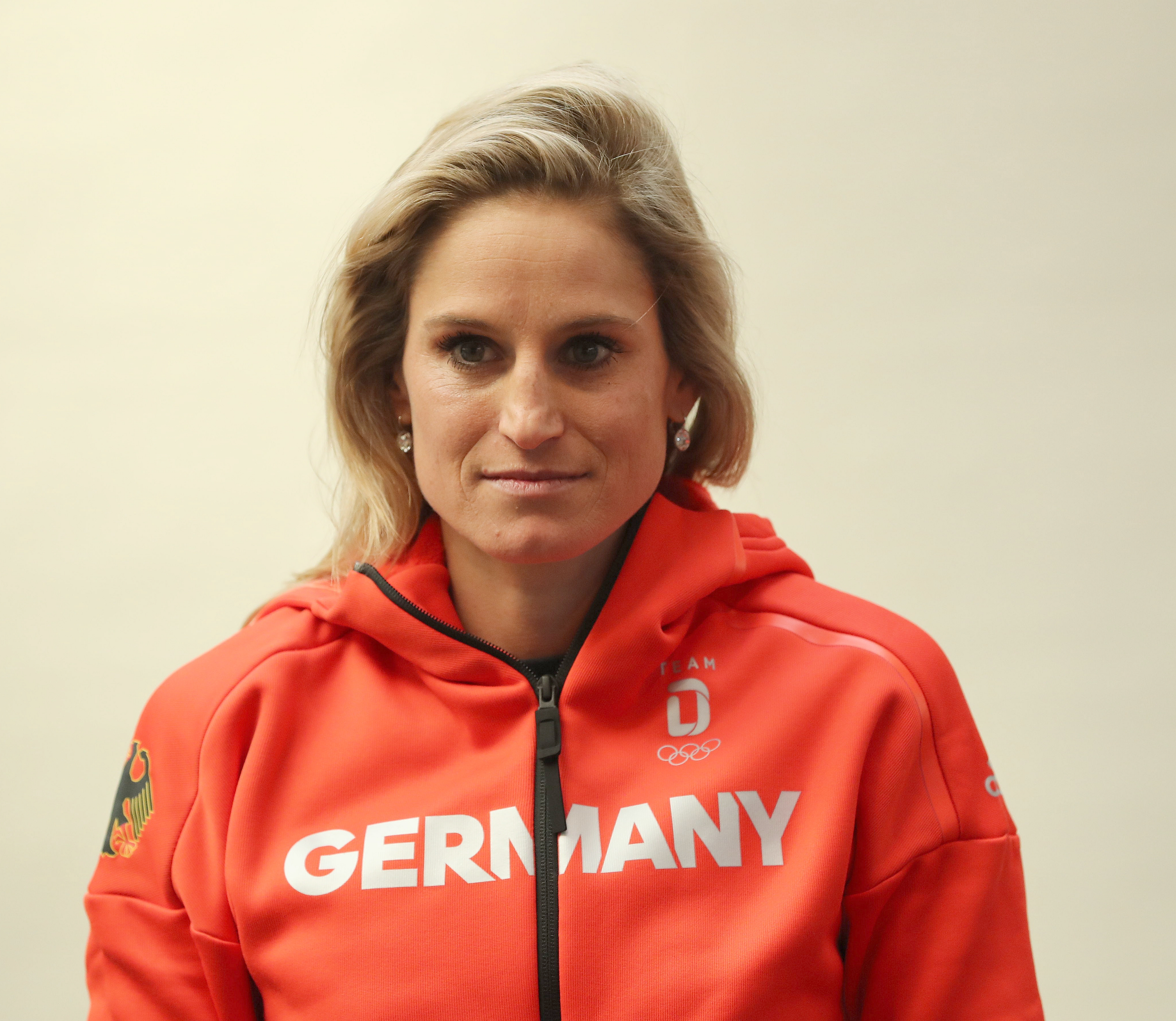
- Nicole Fessel, 2018

Personal information
- Nationality: Germany
- Born: 19 May 1983 (age 43) Annweiler am Trifels, West Germany
- Height: 1.70 m (5 ft 7 in)

Sport
- Sport: Skiing
- Club: SC Oberstdorf

World Cup career
- Seasons: 16 – (2003–2018)
- Indiv. starts: 242
- Indiv. podiums: 3
- Indiv. wins: 0
- Team starts: 28
- Team podiums: 2
- Team wins: 0
- Overall titles: 0 – (8th in 2015)
- Discipline titles: 0
Medal record
Women's cross-country skiing
Representing Germany
Olympic Games
Bronze medal – third place	2014 Sochi	4 × 5 km relay
U23 World Championships
Gold medal – first place	2005 Oberstdorf	Individual sprint
Gold medal – first place	2005 Oberstdorf	10 km freestyle
Bronze medal – third place	2006 Kranj	Individual sprint
Junior World Championships
Gold medal – first place	2003 Sollefteå	Individual sprint
Silver medal – second place	2002 Schonach	Individual sprint

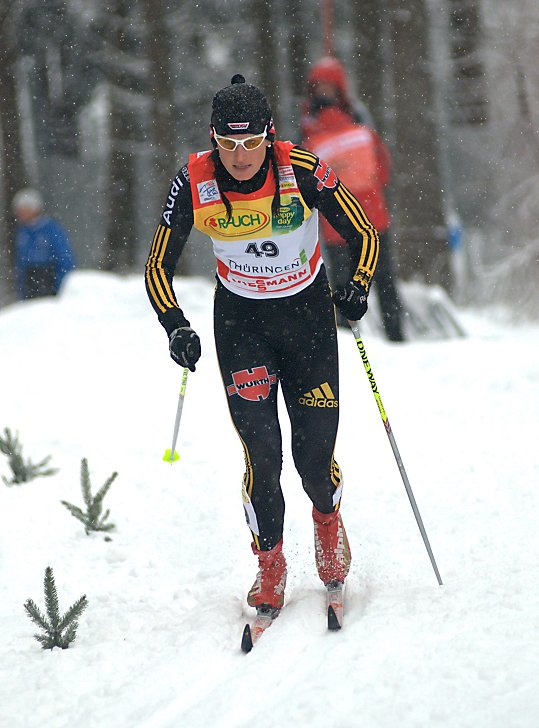
Nicole Fessel in Tour de Ski, 2010

Nicole Fessel (born 19 May 1983) is a German former cross-country skier who competed between 2000 and 2018. Her best World Cup finish was second twice (team sprint: 2009, 4 × 5 km relay: March 2010). Fessel's best individual finish was second in Switzerland in 2014.

Competing in two Winter Olympics, her best finish was 17th in the individual sprint event at Vancouver in 2010 Fessel's best finish at the FIS Nordic World Ski Championships was 15th twice, both in the sprint events (2007, 2009).

She announced her retirement from cross-country skiing in September 2019.

== Cross-country skiing results ==
All results are sourced from the International Ski Federation (FIS).

=== Olympic Games ===
- 1 medal – (1 bronze)

Year	Age	10 km individual	15 km skiathlon	30 km mass start	Sprint	4 × 5 km relay	Team sprint
2006	22	—	—	48	31	—	—
2010	26	—	22	—	17	—	—
2014	30	21	14	DNF	—	Bronze	—
2018	34	—	DNS	—	—	—	10

=== World Championships ===
Year	Age	10 km individual	15 km skiathlon	30 km mass start	Sprint	4 × 5 km relay	Team sprint
2005	21	55	—	—	—	—	—
2007	23	—	—	—	15	—	—
2009	25	—	—	—	15	—	—
2011	27	—	7	7	15	5	7
2013	29	25	22	5	12	7	—
2015	31	46	—	DNS	—	6	4
2017	32	16	—	21	—	6	6

=== World Cup ===
==== Season standings ====
Season	Age	Discipline standings			Ski Tour standings			
Season	Age	Overall	Distance	Sprint	Nordic Opening	Tour de Ski	World Cup Final	Ski Tour Canada
2003	20	73	—N/a	52	—N/a	—N/a	—N/a	—N/a
2004	21	69	NC	43	—N/a	—N/a	—N/a	—N/a
2005	22	84	NC	61	—N/a	—N/a	—N/a	—N/a
2006	23	53	NC	27	—N/a	—N/a	—N/a	—N/a
2007	24	36	70	21	—N/a	42	—N/a	—N/a
2008	25	44	67	30	—N/a	—	40	—N/a
2009	26	52	NC	33	—N/a	DNF	—	—N/a
2010	27	48	45	29	—N/a	DNF	—	—N/a
2011	28	17	20	33	4	—	11	—N/a
2012	29	17	17	23	13	25	12	—N/a
2013	30	22	19	49	10	DNF	23	—N/a
2014	31	43	32	42	27	DNF	30	—N/a
2015	32	8	6	NC	20	7	—N/a	—N/a
2016	33	22	18	64	13	DNF	—N/a	19
2017	34	18	12	NC	DNF	15	9	—N/a
2018	35	43	22	NC	—	DNF	—	—N/a

==== Individual podiums ====
3 podiums – (3 WC)

No.	Season	Date	Location	Race	Level	Place
1	2010–11	28 November 2010	Rukatunturi, Finland	10 km Pursuit F	World Cup	2nd
2	2012–13	2 February 2013	Sochi, Russia	7.5 km + 7.5 km Skiathlon C/F	World Cup	3rd
3	2014–15	20 December 2014	Davos, Switzerland	10 km Individual F	World Cup	2nd

==== Team podiums ====
- 2 podiums – (1 RL, 1 TS)

No.	Season	Date	Location	Race	Level	Place	Teammate(s)
1	2008–09	18 January 2009	Whistler, Canada	6 × 1.3 km Team Sprint F	World Cup	2nd	Böhler
2	2009–10	7 March 2010	Lahti, Finland	4 × 5 km Relay C/F	World Cup	2nd	Zeller / Gössner / Sachenbacher-Stehle
