= FIS Nordic World Ski Championships 2013 – Women's sprint =

Women's sprint at the FIS Nordic World Ski Championships 2013
- Date: 21 February 2013
- Competitors: 103 from 34 nations
- Winning time: 3:16.6

Medalists
gold medal	Marit Bjørgen	Norway
silver medal	Ida Ingemarsdotter	Sweden
bronze medal	Maiken Caspersen Falla	Norway

The women's sprint in the FIS Nordic World Ski Championships 2013 was held on 21 February 2013. The qualifying was held in the morning to determine the final participants.

Marit Bjørgen of Norway successfully defended her title from the previous championships and won the gold medal, while Ida Ingemarsdotter of Sweden won the silver medal, and Maiken Caspersen Falla of Norway won the bronze.

== Qualification ==
Rank	Bib	Athlete	Country	Time	Deficit	Note
1	36	Mona-Liisa Malvalehto	Finland	3:24.01		Q
2	15	Justyna Kowalczyk	Poland	3:24.44	+0.43	Q
3	8	Alena Procházková	Slovakia	3:24.69	+0.68	Q
4	18	Anne Kyllönen	Finland	3:25.24	+1.23	Q
5	13	Katja Višnar	Slovenia	3:25.45	+1.44	Q
6	30	Maiken Caspersen Falla	Norway	3:26.51	+2.50	Q
7	27	Kerttu Niskanen	Finland	3:27.01	+3.00	Q
8	21	Yevgeniya Shapovalova	Russia	3:27.18	+3.17	Q
9	31	Ida Ingemarsdotter	Sweden	3:27.51	+3.50	Q
10	12	Denise Herrmann	Germany	3:28.01	+4.00	Q
11	14	Katerina Smutna	Austria	3:28.26	+4.25	Q
12	16	Krista Lähteenmäki	Finland	3:28.35	+4.34	Q
12	26	Astrid Uhrenholdt Jacobsen	Norway	3:28.35	+4.34	Q
14	22	Marit Bjørgen	Norway	3:29.62	+5.61	Q
15	6	Natalya Matveyeva	Russia	3:30.03	+6.02	Q
16	10	Stina Nilsson	Sweden	3:30.13	+6.12	Q
17	20	Charlotte Kalla	Sweden	3:30.41	+6.40	Q
17	33	Aurore Jéan	France	3:30.41	+6.40	Q
19	24	Anastasia Dotsenko	Russia	3:30.70	+6.69	Q
20	11	Magdalena Pajala	Sweden	3:31.13	+7.12	Q
21	17	Hanna Kolb	Germany	3:31.22	+7.21	Q
22	34	Vesna Fabjan	Slovenia	3:31.67	+7.66	Q
23	9	Nicole Fessel	Germany	3:31.91	+7.90	Q
24	23	Ingvild Flugstad Østberg	Norway	3:32.45	+8.44	Q
25	1	Yuliya Ivanova	Russia	3:32.53	+8.52	Q
26	35	Laurien van der Graaff	Switzerland	3:33.15	+9.14	Q
27	29	Celine Brun-Lie	Norway	3:33.42	+9.41	Q
28	32	Kikkan Randall	United States	3:33.67	+9.66	Q
29	39	Triin Ojaste	Estonia	3:34.70	+10.69	Q
30	38	Sophie Caldwell	United States	3:34.81	+10.80	Q
31	5	Greta Laurent	Italy	3:34.93	+10.92	
32	3	Sadie Bjornsen	United States	3:34.96	+10.95	
33	19	Ida Sargent	United States	3:35.43	+11.42	
34	44	Karolina Grohová	Czech Republic	3:36.90	+12.89	
35	40	Eva Vrabcová-Nyvltová	Czech Republic	3:37.38	+13.37	
36	41	Célia Aymonier	France	3:37.61	+13.60	
37	4	Alenka Čebašek	Slovenia	3:37.71	+13.70	
38	2	Sandra Ringwald	Germany	3:37.79	+13.78	
39	45	Kerstin Muschet	Austria	3:38.30	+14.29	
40	49	Agnieszka Szymanczak	Poland	3:38.74	+14.73	
41	52	Man Dandan	China	3:38.86	+14.85	
42	25	Daria Gaiazova	Canada	3:39.02	+15.01	
43	7	Gaia Vuerich	Italy	3:39.27	+15.26	
44	43	Piret Pormeister	Estonia	3:39.95	+15.94	
45	47	Valiantsina Kaminskaya	Belarus	3:39.98	+15.97	
46	37	Bettina Gruber	Switzerland	3:40.50	+16.49	
47	51	Francesca Baudin	Italy	3:40.55	+16.54	
48	28	Perianne Jones	Canada	3:41.73	+17.72	
49	46	Andrea Dupont	Canada	3:42.49	+18.48	
50	76	Tetyana Antypenko	Ukraine	3:42.81	+18.80	
51	54	Lucie Charvatová	Czech Republic	3:44.93	+20.92	
52	58	Sandra Schützová	Czech Republic	3:45.10	+21.09	
53	50	Nika Razinger	Slovenia	3:45.87	+21.86	
54	78	Kornelia Kubińska	Poland	3:45.93	+21.92	
55	42	Ilaria Debertolis	Italy	3:46.13	+22.12	
56	57	Paulina Maciuszek	Poland	3:46.53	+22.52	
57	48	Emily Nishikawa	Canada	3:46.88	+22.87	
58	72	Li Hongxue	China	3:47.02	+23.01	
59	53	Rosamund Musgrave	Great Britain	3:47.07	+23.06	
60	61	Anna Stoyan	Kazakhstan	3:48.66	+24.65	
61	55	Esther Bottomley	Australia	3:48.86	+24.85	
62	65	Oxana Yatskaya	Kazakhstan	3:50.69	+26.68	
63	74	Barbora Klementová	Slovakia	3:51.60	+27.59	
64	66	Viktoriya Lanchakova	Kazakhstan	3:52.05	+28.04	
65	80	Anna Shevchenko	Kazakhstan	3:52.38	+28.37	
66	62	Daniela Kotschová	Slovakia	3:52.80	+28.79	
67	56	Kaija Vahtra	Estonia	3:53.14	+29.13	
68	59	Nina Broznić	Croatia	3:53.30	+29.29	
69	70	Kateryna Grygorenko	Ukraine	3:53.82	+29.81	
70	64	Li Xin	China	3:56.66	+31.65	
71	75	Inga Daushkane	Latvia	3:57.63	+33.62	
72	68	Vedrana Malec	Croatia	3:57.90	+33.89	
73	63	Ingrida Ardišauskaitė	Lithuania	4:00.98	+36.97	
74	67	Sarah Young	Great Britain	4:01.24	+37.23	
75	101	Nadezhda Demineva	Kyrgyzstan	4:01.46	+37.45	
76	69	Teodora Malcheva	Bulgaria	4:01.83	+37.82	
77	83	Iryna Leletko	Ukraine	4:02.31	+38.30	
78	60	Timeea Sara	Romania	4:04.02	+40.01	
79	98	Emőke Szőcs	Hungary	4:06.53	+42.52	
80	79	Anna Trnka	Australia	4:10.60	+46.59	
81	71	Antoniya Grigorova-Burgova	Bulgaria	4:11.88	+47.87	
82	73	Vineta Pētersone	Latvia	4:16.71	+52.70	
83	93	Signe Schlør	Denmark	4:17.77	+53.76	
84	95	Anda Miuzhniece	Latvia	4:18.57	+54.56	
85	84	Lescinska Grimmer	Australia	4:20.33	+56.32	
86	88	Ágnes Simon	Hungary	4:24.14	+1:00.13	
87	94	Ildikó Papp	Hungary	4:26.38	+1:02.37	
88	82	Syuzanna Varosyan	Armenia	4:28.40	+1:04.39	
89	87	Anna Mkhitaryan	Armenia	4:30.80	+1:06.79	
90	90	Natalija Kovalova	Latvia	4:36.05	+1:12.04	
91	96	Katya Galstyan	Armenia	4:39.54	+1:15.53	
92	91	Viktória Zámbó	Hungary	4:46.68	+1:22.67	
93	86	Valya Varosyan	Armenia	4:52.65	+1:28.64	
94	92	Maria Boumpa	Greece	4:58.12	+1:34.11	
95	99	Alexandra Camenșcic	Moldova	5:09.94	+1:45.93	
96	77	Farzaneh Rezasoltani	Iran	5:40.36	+2:16.35	
97	102	Doina Cravcenco	Moldova	5:52.97	+2:28.96	
98	103	Anna Berghii	Moldova	5:54.58	+2:30.57	
99	89	Golnaz Savoji Asl	Iran	5:56.51	+2:32.50	
100	100	Dumitrita Ciobanu	Moldova	6:01.25	+2:37.24	
101	97	Azadeh Kiashemshaki	Iran	6:05.15	+2:41.14	
	81	Panagiota Tsakiri	Greece	DNS		
	85	Guo Liping	China	DNS		

== Quarterfinals ==
=== Quarterfinal 1 ===
Rank	Seed	Athlete	Country	Time	Deficit	Note
1	10	Denise Herrmann	Germany	3:24.4		Q
2	1	Mona-Liisa Malvalehto	Finland	3:25.5	+1.1	Q
3	11	Kateřina Smutná	Austria	3:25.6	+1.2	
4	30	Sophie Caldwell	United States	3:26.3	+1.9	
5	21	Hanna Kolb	Germany	3:27.3	+2.9	
6	20	Magdalena Pajala	Sweden	3:28.0	+3.6	

=== Quarterfinal 2 ===
Rank	Seed	Athlete	Country	Time	Deficit	Note
1	14	Marit Bjørgen	Norway	3:20.9		Q
2	17	Charlotte Kalla	Sweden	3:22.1	+1.2	Q
3	7	Kerttu Niskanen	Finland	3:22.4	+1.5	LL
4	24	Ingvild Flugstad Østberg	Norway	3:22.5	+1.6	
5	27	Celine Brun-Lie	Norway	3:24.7	+3.8	
6	4	Anne Kyllönen	Finland	3:27.0	+6.1	

=== Quarterfinal 3 ===
Rank	Seed	Athlete	Country	Time	Deficit	Note
1	16	Stina Nilsson	Sweden	3:21.8		Q
2	5	Katja Višnar	Slovenia	3:22.1	+0.3	Q
3	6	Maiken Caspersen Falla	Norway	3:22.2	+0.4	LL
4	25	Yuliya Ivanova	Russia	3:24.3	+2.5	
5	15	Natalya Matveyeva	Russia	3:25.8	+4.0	
6	26	Laurien van der Graaff	Switzerland	3:33.3	+11.5	

=== Quarterfinal 4 ===
Rank	Seed	Athlete	Country	Time	Deficit	Note
1	2	Justyna Kowalczyk	Poland	3:20.4		Q
2	9	Ida Ingemarsdotter	Sweden	3:21.2	+0.8	Q
3	19	Anastasia Dotsenko	Russia	3:23.8	+3.4	
4	12	Astrid Uhrenholdt Jacobsen	Norway	3:25.4	+5.0	
5	29	Triin Ojaste	Estonia	3:29.0	+8.6	
6	22	Vesna Fabjan	Slovenia	3:30.5	+10.1	

=== Quarterfinal 5 ===
Rank	Seed	Athlete	Country	Time	Deficit	Note
1	3	Alena Procházková	Slovakia	3:22.8		Q
2	23	Nicole Fessel	Germany	3:22.9	+0.1	Q
3	13	Krista Lähteenmäki	Finland	3:23.6	+0.8	
4	28	Kikkan Randall	United States	3:25.1	+2.3	
5	18	Aurore Jéan	France	3:26.0	+3.2	
6	8	Yevgeniya Shapovalova	Russia	3:26.4	+3.6	

== Semifinals ==
=== Semifinal 1 ===
Rank	Seed	Athlete	Country	Time	Deficit	Note
1	14	Marit Bjørgen	Norway	3:20.0		Q
2	6	Maiken Caspersen Falla	Norway	3:20.4	+0.4	Q
3	5	Katja Višnar	Slovenia	3:20.9	+0.9	LL
4	1	Mona-Liisa Malvalehto	Finland	3:22.0	+2.0	
5	10	Denise Herrmann	Germany	3:23.1	+3.1	
6	17	Charlotte Kalla	Sweden	3:23.9	+3.9	

=== Semifinal 2 ===
Rank	Seed	Athlete	Country	Time	Deficit	Note
1	2	Justyna Kowalczyk	Poland	3:19.9		Q
2	9	Ida Ingemarsdotter	Sweden	3:20.4	+0.5	Q
3	16	Stina Nilsson	Sweden	3:20.9	+1.0	LL
4	3	Alena Procházková	Slovakia	3:22.2	+2.3	
5	7	Kerttu Niskanen	Finland	3:22.6	+2.7	
6	23	Nicole Fessel	Germany	3:24.4	+4.5	

== Finals ==
The races were held from 12:45 to 14:13.

Rank	Seed	Athlete	Country	Time	Deficit	Note
1st place, gold medalist(s)	14	Marit Bjørgen	Norway	3:16.6		
2nd place, silver medalist(s)	9	Ida Ingemarsdotter	Sweden	3:18.9	+2.3	
3rd place, bronze medalist(s)	6	Maiken Caspersen Falla	Norway	3:20.4	+3.8	
4	5	Katja Višnar	Slovenia	3:21.2	+4.6	
5	16	Stina Nilsson	Sweden	3:21.5	+4.9	
6	2	Justyna Kowalczyk	Poland	3:22.9	+6.3	
