= Anne Kyllönen =

Finnish cross-country skier

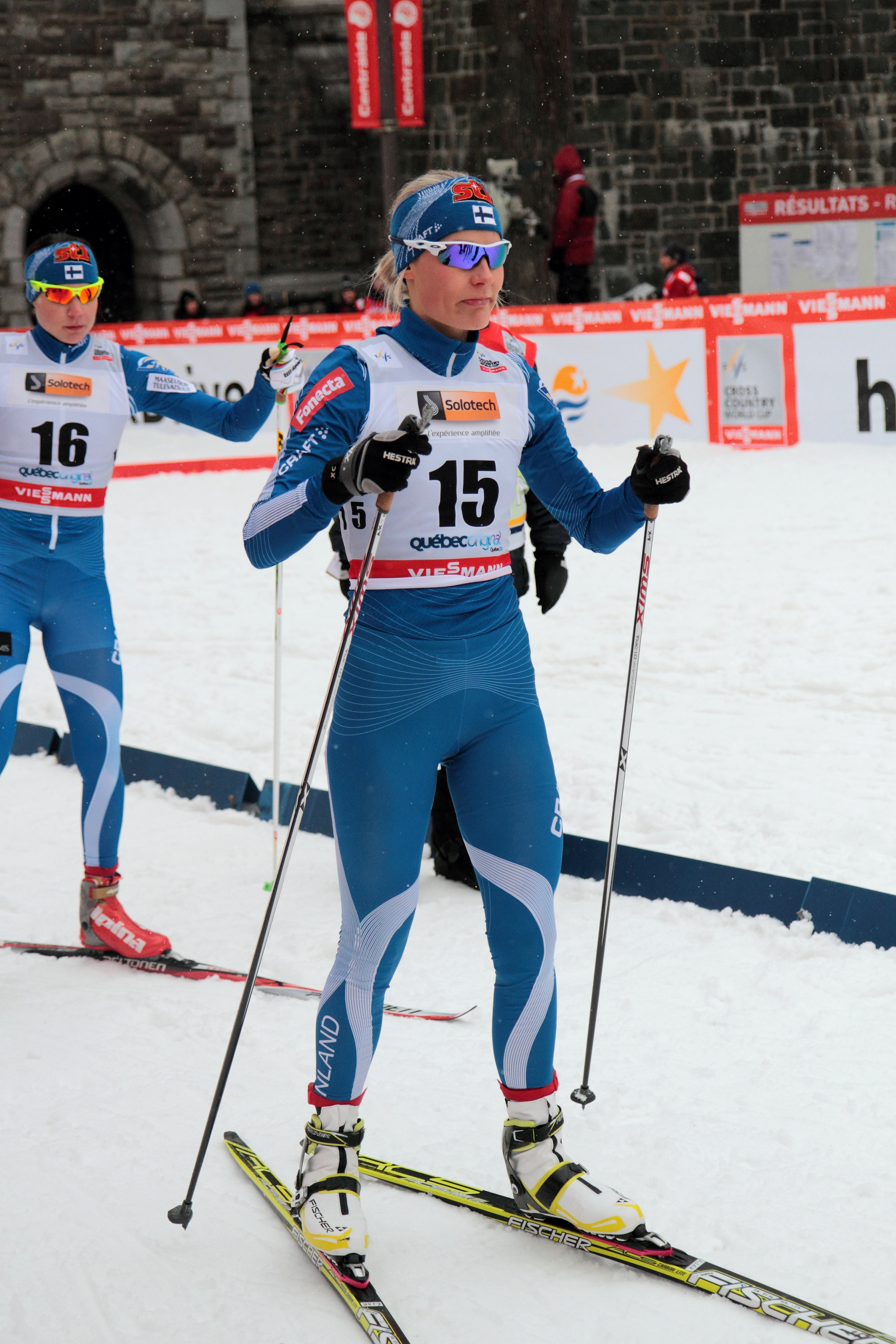
- Kyllönen in 2012

Personal information
- Full name: Anne Maria Kyllönen
- Nationality: Finland
- Born: 30 November 1987 (age 38) Kajaani, Finland
- Height: 167 cm (5 ft 6 in)

Sport
- Sport: Skiing
- Club: Kainuun Hiihtoseura

World Cup career
- Seasons: 17 – (2008–present)
- Indiv. starts: 319
- Indiv. podiums: 9
- Indiv. wins: 0
- Team starts: 27
- Team podiums: 8
- Team wins: 2
- Overall titles: 0 – (7th in 2013)
- Discipline titles: 0
Medal record
Women's cross-country skiing
Representing Finland
Olympic Games
Silver medal – second place	2014 Sochi	4 × 5 km relay
Junior World Championships
Bronze medal – third place	2007 Tarvisio	4 × 3.33 km relay
- Updated on 21 January 2024

Anne Maria Kyllönen (born 30 November 1987) is a Finnish cross-country skier. She debuted in the FIS Cross-Country World Cup on 1 December 2007. Kyllönen won the world cup classic team sprint in Sochi in 2013 with Mona-Lisa Malvalehto, and also the classic team sprint in Asiago in 2013 with Aino-Kaisa Saarinen. In the 2016 Tour de Ski, Kyllönen was seventh overall, a personal best.

== Cross-country skiing results ==
All results are sourced from the International Ski Federation (FIS).

=== Olympic Games ===
- 1 medal – (1 silver)

Year	Age	10 km individual	15 km skiathlon	30 km mass start	Sprint	4 × 5 km relay	Team sprint
2014	26	13	32	—	16	Silver	—
2022	34	16	22	20	—	4	—

=== World Championships ===
Year	Age	10 km individual	15 km skiathlon	30 km mass start	Sprint	4 × 5 km relay	Team sprint
2011	23	—	—	—	33	—	—
2013	25	—	17	8	26	5	—
2015	27	—	—	21	20	—	10
2017	29	38	12	—	—	—	—
2019	31	—	—	—	33	—	7
2021	33	40	—	—	37	—	—
2023	35	—	DNF	26	24	—	—

=== World Cup ===
==== Season standings ====
Season	Age	Discipline standings			Ski Tour standings				
Season	Age	Overall	Distance	Sprint	Nordic Opening	Tour de Ski	Ski Tour 2020	World Cup Final	Ski Tour Canada
2008	20	NC	NC	NC	—N/a	—	—N/a	—	—N/a
2009	21	NC	NC	NC	—N/a	—	—N/a	—	—N/a
2010	22	90	NC	65	—N/a	—	—N/a	—	—N/a
2011	23	44	42	25	DNF	DNF	—N/a	34	—N/a
2012	24	21	25	9	15	21	—N/a	20	—N/a
2013	25	7	5	5	11	9	—N/a	8	—N/a
2014	26	11	13	10	15	6	—N/a	23	—N/a
2015	27	20	25	23	31	14	—N/a	—N/a	—N/a
2016	28	10	7	19	21	7	—N/a	—N/a	8
2017	29	14	16	47	17	7	—N/a	28	—N/a
2018	30	63	47	65	34	DNF	—N/a	DNF	—N/a
2019	31	67	47	NC	—	DNF	—N/a	37	—N/a
2020	32	21	19	23	37	13	19	—N/a	—N/a
2021	33	89	67	73	47	—	—N/a	—N/a	—N/a
2022	34	25	24	39	—N/a	15	—N/a	—N/a	—N/a
2023	35	29	23	39	—N/a	19	—N/a	—N/a	—N/a
2024	36	27	30	21	—N/a	20	—N/a	—N/a	—N/a

==== Individual podiums ====
- 9 podiums – (5 WC, 4 SWC)

No.	Season	Date	Location	Race	Level	Place
1	2012–13	13 December 2012	Canmore, Canada	10 km Mass Start C	World Cup	2nd
2	2012–13	16 December 2012	Canmore, Canada	7.5 + 7.5 km Skiathlon C/F	World Cup	2nd
3	2012–13	20 December 2012	Oberhof, Germany	9 km Pursuit C	Stage World Cup	3rd
4	2012–13	16 February 2013	Davos, Switzerland	1.5 km Sprint C	World Cup	3rd
5	2013–14	21 December 2013	Asiago, Italy	1.25 km Sprint C	World Cup	2nd
6	2013–14	3 January 2014	Cortina-Toblach, Italy	15 km Pursuit F	Stage World Cup	3rd
7	2013–14	4 January 2014	Val di Fiemme, Italy	5 km Individual C	Stage World Cup	3rd
8	2015–16	7 February 2016	Oslo, Norway	30 km Mass Start C	World Cup	3rd
9	2016–17	7 January 2017	Val di Fiemme, Italy	10 km Mass Start C	Stage World Cup	2nd

==== Team podiums ====
- 2 victories – (2 TS)
- 8 podiums – (6 RL, 2 TS)

No.	Season	Date	Location	Race	Level	Place	Teammate(s)
1	2012–13	20 January 2013	La Clusaz, France	4 × 5 km Relay C/F	World Cup	2nd	Saarinen / Roponen / Niskanen
2	2012–13	3 February 2013	Sochi, Russia	6 × 1.25 km Team Sprint C	World Cup	1st	Malvalehto
3	2013–14	8 December 2013	Lillehammer, Norway	4 × 5 km Relay C/F	World Cup	2nd	Saarinen / Niskanen / Lähteenmäki
4	2013–14	22 December 2013	Asiago, Italy	6 × 1.25 km Team Sprint C	World Cup	1st	Saarinen
5	2015–16	6 December 2015	Lillehammer, Norway	4 × 5 km Relay C/F	World Cup	2nd	Pärmäkoski / Niskanen / Mononen
6	2015–16	24 January 2016	Nové Město, Czech Republic	4 × 5 km Relay C/F	World Cup	3rd	Pärmäkoski / Roponen / Niskanen
7	2016–17	18 December 2016	La Clusaz, France	4 × 5 km Relay C/F	World Cup	2nd	Saarinen / Roponen / Mononen
8	2023–24	21 January 2024	Oberhof, Germany	4 × 7.5 km Relay C/F	World Cup	3rd	Matintalo / Pärmäkoski / Joensuu
