= Greta Laurent =

Italian cross-country skier

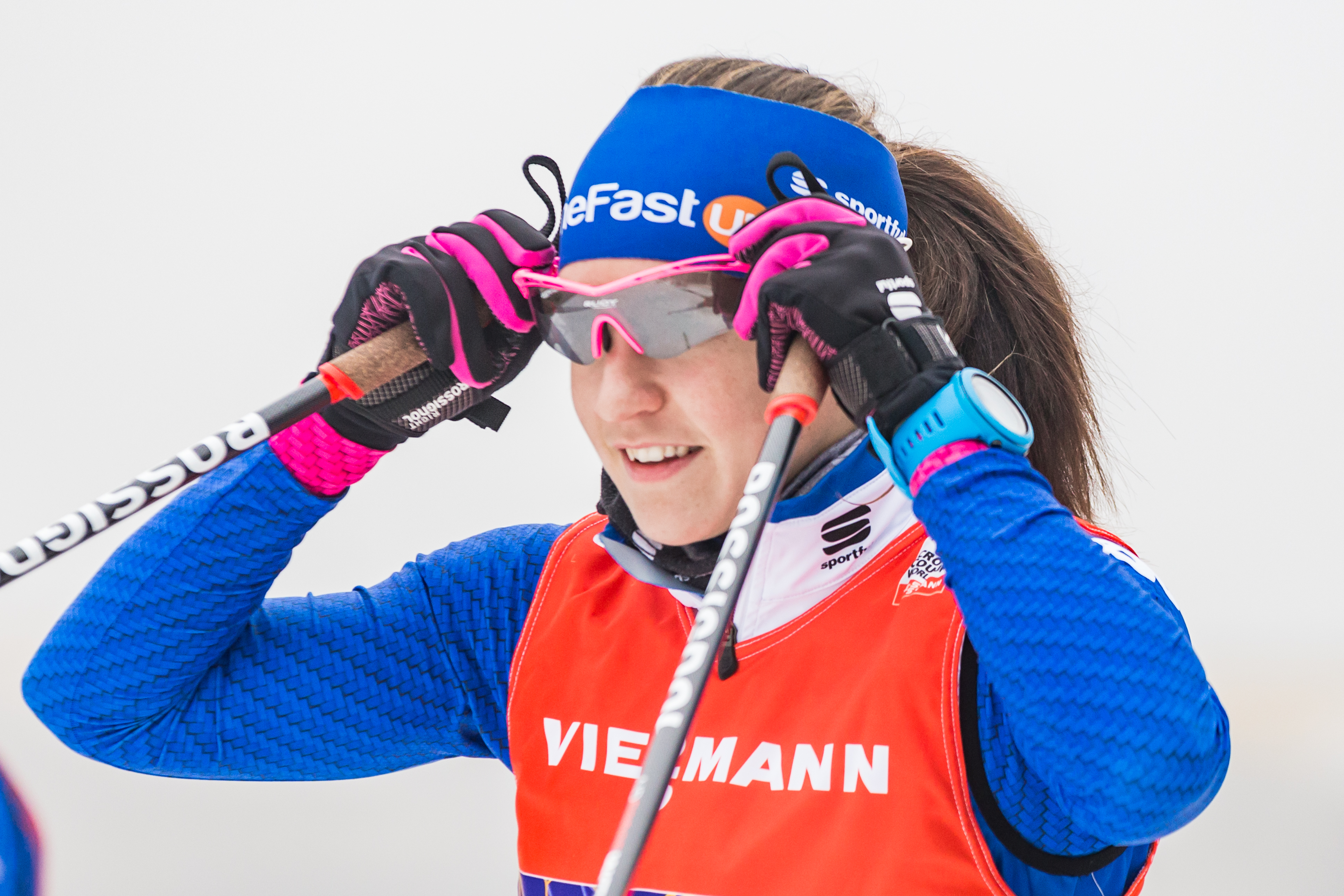

Personal information
- Nationality: Italy
- Born: 3 May 1992 (age 34) Ivrea, Italy

Sport
- Sport: Skiing
- Club: G.S. Fiamme Gialle

World Cup career
- Seasons: 12 – (2012–2023)
- Indiv. starts: 109
- Indiv. podiums: 0
- Team starts: 16
- Team podiums: 0
- Overall titles: 0 – (35th in 2022)
- Discipline titles: 0

Greta Laurent (French: [lɔʁɑ̃]; born 3 May 1992) is an Italian cross-country skier. She competed at the FIS Nordic World Ski Championships 2013 in Val di Fiemme. She competed at the 2014 Winter Olympics in Sochi, where she reached the quarter finals in women's sprint. and 2018 Winter Olympics in Pyeongchang.

== Biography ==
Born in Ivrea but originally from Gressoney-Saint-Jean, Laurent has been in a relationship with fellow cross-country skier Federico Pellegrino since 2012, having previously been a couple during their school-age careers. Pellegrino dedicated his first World Cup race win in 2014 to Laurent. Since 2012 they have lived in Gressoney-Saint-Jean.

== Cross-country skiing results ==
All results are sourced from the International Ski Federation (FIS).

=== Olympic Games ===
Year	Age	10 km individual	15 km skiathlon	30 km mass start	Sprint	4 × 5 km relay	Team sprint
2014	21	—	—	—	25	—	—
2018	25	—	—	—	32	—	—
2022	29	—	—	—	28	—	—

=== World Championships ===
Year	Age	10 km individual	15 km skiathlon	30 km mass start	Sprint	4 × 5 km relay	Team sprint
2015	22	—	—	—	37	—	—
2017	24	—	—	—	29	—	—
2019	26	—	—	—	22	—	11
2021	28	—	—	—	19	—	11

=== World Cup ===
==== Season standings ====
Season	Age	Discipline standings			Ski Tour standings				
Season	Age	Overall	Distance	Sprint	Nordic Opening	Tour de Ski	Ski Tour 2020	World Cup Final	Ski Tour Canada
2012	19	NC	—	NC	—	—	—N/a	—	—N/a
2013	20	104	—	66	—	—	—N/a	—	—N/a
2014	21	65	NC	36	—	DNF	—N/a	—	—N/a
2015	22	97	NC	54	DNF	DNF	—N/a	—N/a	—N/a
2016	23	62	—	41	—	DNF	—N/a	—N/a	—
2017	24	93	NC	57	DNF	—	—N/a	—	—N/a
2018	25	65	—	36	—	DNF	—N/a	DNF	—N/a
2019	26	52	NC	24	DNF	DNF	—N/a	54	—N/a
2020	27	50	NC	22	DNF	DNF	DNF	—N/a	—N/a
2021	28	55	NC	22	64	DNF	—N/a	—N/a	—N/a
2022	29	35	NC	16	—N/a	DNF	—N/a	—N/a	—N/a
