= FIS Nordic World Ski Championships 2015 – Women's sprint =

Women's sprint at the FIS Nordic World Ski Championships 2015
- Date: 19 February 2015
- Competitors: 94 from 37 nations
- Winning time: 3:26.63

Medalists
gold medal	Marit Bjørgen	Norway
silver medal	Stina Nilsson	Sweden
bronze medal	Maiken Caspersen Falla	Norway

The Women's sprint event of the FIS Nordic World Ski Championships 2015 was held on 19 February 2015.

== Results ==
=== Qualification ===
The qualification was held at 13:00.

Rank	Bib	Athlete	Country	Time	Deficit	Note
1	3	Justyna Kowalczyk	Poland	3:24.89		Q
2	11	Maiken Caspersen Falla	Norway	3:25.13	+0.24	Q
3	4	Kari Vikhagen Gjeitnes	Norway	3:25.40	+0.51	Q
4	6	Ingvild Flugstad Østberg	Norway	3:25.54	+0.65	Q
5	18	Stina Nilsson	Sweden	3:26.08	+1.19	Q
6	8	Marit Bjørgen	Norway	3:27.43	+2.54	Q
7	28	Sandra Ringwald	Germany	3:27.69	+2.80	Q
8	22	Katja Višnar	Slovenia	3:27.71	+2.82	Q
9	7	Anastasia Dotsenko	Russia	3:28.23	+3.34	Q
10	10	Celine Brun-Lie	Norway	3:28.91	+4.02	Q
11	14	Magdalena Pajala	Sweden	3:29.64	+4.75	Q
12	25	Kerttu Niskanen	Finland	3:30.23	+5.34	Q
13	13	Ida Ingemarsdotter	Sweden	3:30.26	+5.37	Q
14	38	Alena Procházková	Slovakia	3:30.40	+5.51	Q
15	2	Hanna Falk	Sweden	3:31.09	+6.20	Q
16	34	Francesca Baudin	Italy	3:31.76	+6.87	Q
17	5	Yevgeniya Shapovalova	Russia	3:31.94	+7.05	Q
18	19	Natalya Matveyeva	Russia	3:32.35	+7.46	Q
19	21	Denise Herrmann	Germany	3:32.44	+7.55	Q
20	29	Aino-Kaisa Saarinen	Finland	3:32.60	+7.71	Q
21	16	Sophie Caldwell	United States	3:32.76	+7.87	Q
22	12	Mona-Liisa Malvalehto	Finland	3:32.81	+7.92	Q
23	17	Laurien van der Graaff	Switzerland	3:32.95	+8.06	Q
24	32	Célia Aymonier	France	3:33.22	+8.33	Q
25	30	Yuliya Romanova	Russia	3:34.22	+9.33	Q
26	15	Sadie Bjornsen	United States	3:34.36	+9.47	Q
27	24	Anne Kyllönen	Finland	3:34.47	+9.58	Q
28	31	Perianne Jones	Canada	3:34.79	+9.90	Q
29	1	Ida Sargent	United States	3:36.53	+11.64	Q
30	39	Ewelina Marcisz	Poland	3:36.71	+11.82	Q
31	20	Hanna Kolb	Germany	3:36.96	+12.07	
32	33	Kateřina Smutná	Austria	3:37.31	+12.42	
33	36	Sylwia Jaśkowiec	Poland	3:38.37	+13.48	
34	23	Gaia Vuerich	Italy	3:38.70	+13.81	
35	45	Kornelia Kubińska	Poland	3:39.35	+14.46	
36	9	Kikkan Randall	United States	3:39.75	+14.86	
37	35	Anamarija Lampič	Slovenia	3:39.88	+14.99	
38	26	Greta Laurent	Italy	3:39.95	+15.06	
39	37	Victoria Carl	Germany	3:41.17	+16.28	
40	46	Kateryna Serdyuk	Ukraine	3:43.91	+19.02	
41	47	Anna Stoyan	Kazakhstan	3:43.98	+19.09	
42	27	Nika Razinger	Slovenia	3:44.26	+19.37	
43	40	Karolína Grohová	Czech Republic	3:44.43	+19.54	
44	41	Piret Pormeister	Estonia	3:50.52	+25.63	
45	42	Rosamund Musgrave	Great Britain	3:51.04	+26.15	
46	43	Heidi Raju	Estonia	3:51.20	+26.31	
47	49	Anna Shevchenko	Kazakhstan	3:51.30	+26.41	
48	56	Barbora Klementová	Slovakia	3:52.27	+27.38	
49	50	Maryna Antsybor	Ukraine	3:52.53	+27.64	
50	48	Esther Bottomley	Australia	3:55.75	+30.86	
51	44	Jessica Yeaton	Australia	3:56.35	+31.46	
52	51	Viktoriya Lanchakova	Kazakhstan	3:57.48	+32.59	
53	52	Ina Lukonina	Belarus	4:01.23	+36.34	
54	60	Chi Chunxue	China	4:06.50	+41.61	
55	55	Timea Sara	Romania	4:08.48	+43.59	
56	54	Li Xin	China	4:11.37	+46.48	
57	59	Anna Trnka	Australia	4:13.12	+48.23	
58	57	Sarah Hale	Great Britain	4:13.33	+48.44	
59	66	Anda Muižniece	Latvia	4:15.97	+51.08	
60	58	Antoniya Grigorova	Bulgaria	4:18.37	+53.48	
61	69	Lee Chae-won	South Korea	4:19.67	+54.78	
62	62	Xanthea Dewez	Australia	4:21.46	+56.57	
63	73	Enkhbayar Ariuntungalag	Mongolia	4:24.11	+59.22	
64	63	Vineta Pētersone	Latvia	4:32.90	+1:08.01	
65	64	Anna Mkhitaryan	Armenia	4:39.92	+1:15.03	
66	93	Ildikó Papp	Hungary	4:45.42	+1:20.53	
67	78	Jadambaa Khaliunaa	Mongolia	4:50.04	+1:25.15	
68	72	Neda Bukovskyte	Lithuania	4:50.46	+1:25.57	
69	81	Melina Meyer Magulas	Greece	4:55.55	+1:30.66	
70	94	Ágnes Simon	Hungary	5:00.27	+1:35.38	
71	75	Petya Stoycheva	Bulgaria	5:00.85	+1:35.96	
72	67	Katya Galstyan	Armenia	5:01.89	+1:37.00	
73	77	Yvonne Mrzljak	Croatia	5:02.72	+1:37.83	
74	91	Tzvetelina Pavlova	Bulgaria	5:05.50	+1:40.61	
75	68	Laima Klauža	Latvia	5:06.13	+1:41.24	
76	85	Vaska Blagoeva	Bulgaria	5:06.76	+1:41.87	
77	89	Martyna Biliūnaitė	Lithuania	5:13.43	+1:48.54	
78	71	Silvija Adamonytė	Lithuania	5:14.67	+1:49.76	
79	76	Ugnė Kastanauskaitė	Lithuania	5:17.34	+1:52.45	
80	95	Viktória Zámbó	Hungary	5:26.77	+2:01.86	
81	70	Lilit Tonoyan	Armenia	5:28.98	+2:04.09	
82	92	Fanni Juhász	Hungary	5:29.56	+2:04.67	
83	87	Doina Cravcenco	Moldova	5:37.66	+2:12.77	
84	83	Haykanush Yeritsyan	Armenia	5:42.13	+2:17.24	
85	61	Samaneh Beirami Baher	Iran	5:47.07	+2:22.18	
86	82	Rosana Kirsoka	Macedonia	5:56.40	+2:31.51	
87	88	Alexandra Camenșcic	Moldova	6:00.49	+2:35.60	
88	74	Georgia Nimpiti	Greece	6:17.34	+2:52.45	
89	65	Farzaneh Rezasoltani	Iran	6:20.17	+2:55.28	
90	80	Kunduz Abdykadyrova	Kyrgyzstan	6:31.88	+3:06.99	
91	86	Dumitrita Ciobanu	Moldova	7:40.78	+4:15.89	
92	90	Alina Lukianova	Kyrgyzstan	8:04.08	+4:39.19	
93	84	Juliana Tcaciova	Moldova	8:39.62	+5:14.73	
94	79	Makeleta Stephan	Tonga	10:54.67	+7:29.78	
	53	Ekaterina Rudakova	Belarus	DNS		

=== Quarterfinals ===
The quarterfinals were started at 15:15.

==== Quarterfinal 1 ====
Rank	Seed	Athlete	Country	Time	Deficit	Note
1	1	Justyna Kowalczyk	Poland	3:29.55		Q
2	10	Celine Brun-Lie	Norway	3:31.23	+1.68	Q
3	21	Sophie Caldwell	United States	3:31.75	+2.20	q
4	20	Aino-Kaisa Saarinen	Finland	3:37.55	+8.00	
5	30	Ewelina Marcisz	Poland	3:38.85	+9.30	
6	11	Magdalena Pajala	Sweden	3:41.34	+11.79	

==== Quarterfinal 2 ====
Rank	Seed	Athlete	Country	Time	Deficit	Note
1	4	Ingvild Flugstad Østberg	Norway	3:31.06		Q
2	14	Alena Procházková	Slovakia	3:32.32	+1.26	Q
3	7	Sandra Ringwald	Germany	3:38.06	+7.00	
4	27	Anne Kyllönen	Finland	3:38.12	+7.06	
5	17	Yevgeniya Shapovalova	Russia	3:39.51	+8.45	
6	24	Célia Aymonier	France	3:45.58	+14.52	

==== Quarterfinal 3 ====
Rank	Seed	Athlete	Country	Time	Deficit	Note
1	5	Stina Nilsson	Sweden	3:29.33		Q
2	6	Marit Bjørgen	Norway	3:30.15	+0.84	Q
3	16	Francesca Baudin	Italy	3:35.83	+6.50	
4	26	Sadie Bjornsen	United States	3:38.84	+9.51	
5	25	Yuliya Romanova	Russia	3:47.10	+17.77	
	15	Hanna Falk	Sweden	DSQ		

==== Quarterfinal 4 ====
Rank	Seed	Athlete	Country	Time	Deficit	Note
1	2	Maiken Caspersen Falla	Norway	3:32.62		Q
2	12	Kerttu Niskanen	Finland	3:34.11	+1.49	Q
3	9	Anastasia Dotsenko	Russia	3:34.55	+1.93	
4	19	Denise Herrmann	Germany	3:37.70	+5.08	
5	22	Mona-Liisa Malvalehto	Finland	3:38.22	+5.60	
6	29	Ida Sargent	United States	3:41.18	+8.56	

==== Quarterfinal 5 ====
Rank	Seed	Athlete	Country	Time	Deficit	Note
1	8	Katja Višnar	Slovenia	3:29.36		Q
2	3	Kari Vikhagen Gjeitnes	Norway	3:30.29	+0.93	Q
3	13	Ida Ingemarsdotter	Sweden	3:31.82	+2.46	q
4	18	Natalya Matveyeva	Russia	3:32.87	+3.51	
5	28	Perianne Jones	Canada	3:36.24	+6.88	
6	23	Laurien van der Graaff	Switzerland	3:38.06	+8.70	

=== Semifinals ===
The semifinals were started at 16:25.

==== Semifinal 1 ====
Rank	Seed	Athlete	Country	Time	Deficit	Note
1	1	Justyna Kowalczyk	Poland	3:28.90		Q
2	5	Stina Nilsson	Sweden	3:29.55	+0.65	Q
3	4	Ingvild Flugstad Østberg	Norway	3:29.75	+0.85	q
4	14	Alena Procházková	Slovakia	3:34.86	+5.96	
5	10	Celine Brun-Lie	Norway	3:35.70	+6.80	
6	13	Ida Ingemarsdotter	Sweden	3:45.16	+16.26	

==== Semifinal 2 ====
Rank	Seed	Athlete	Country	Time	Deficit	Note
1	6	Marit Bjørgen	Norway	3:28.86		Q
2	2	Maiken Caspersen Falla	Norway	3:29.27	+0.41	Q
3	3	Kari Vikhagen Gjeitnes	Norway	3:29.94	+1.08	q
4	21	Kerttu Niskanen	Finland	3:34.20	+5.34	
5	12	Sophie Caldwell	United States	3:34.72	+5.86	
6	8	Katja Višnar	Slovenia	3:41.05	+12.19	

=== Final ===
The final was held at 17:00.

Rank	Seed	Athlete	Country	Time	Deficit	Note
1st place, gold medalist(s)	6	Marit Bjørgen	Norway	3:26.63		
2nd place, silver medalist(s)	5	Stina Nilsson	Sweden	3:27.05	+0.42	
3rd place, bronze medalist(s)	2	Maiken Caspersen Falla	Norway	3:27.62	+0.99	
4	1	Justyna Kowalczyk	Poland	3:28.06	+1.43	
5	3	Kari Vikhagen Gjeitnes	Norway	3:32.73	+6.10	
6	4	Ingvild Flugstad Østberg	Norway	3:37.10	+10.47	
