= Ida Ingemarsdotter =

Swedish cross-country skier

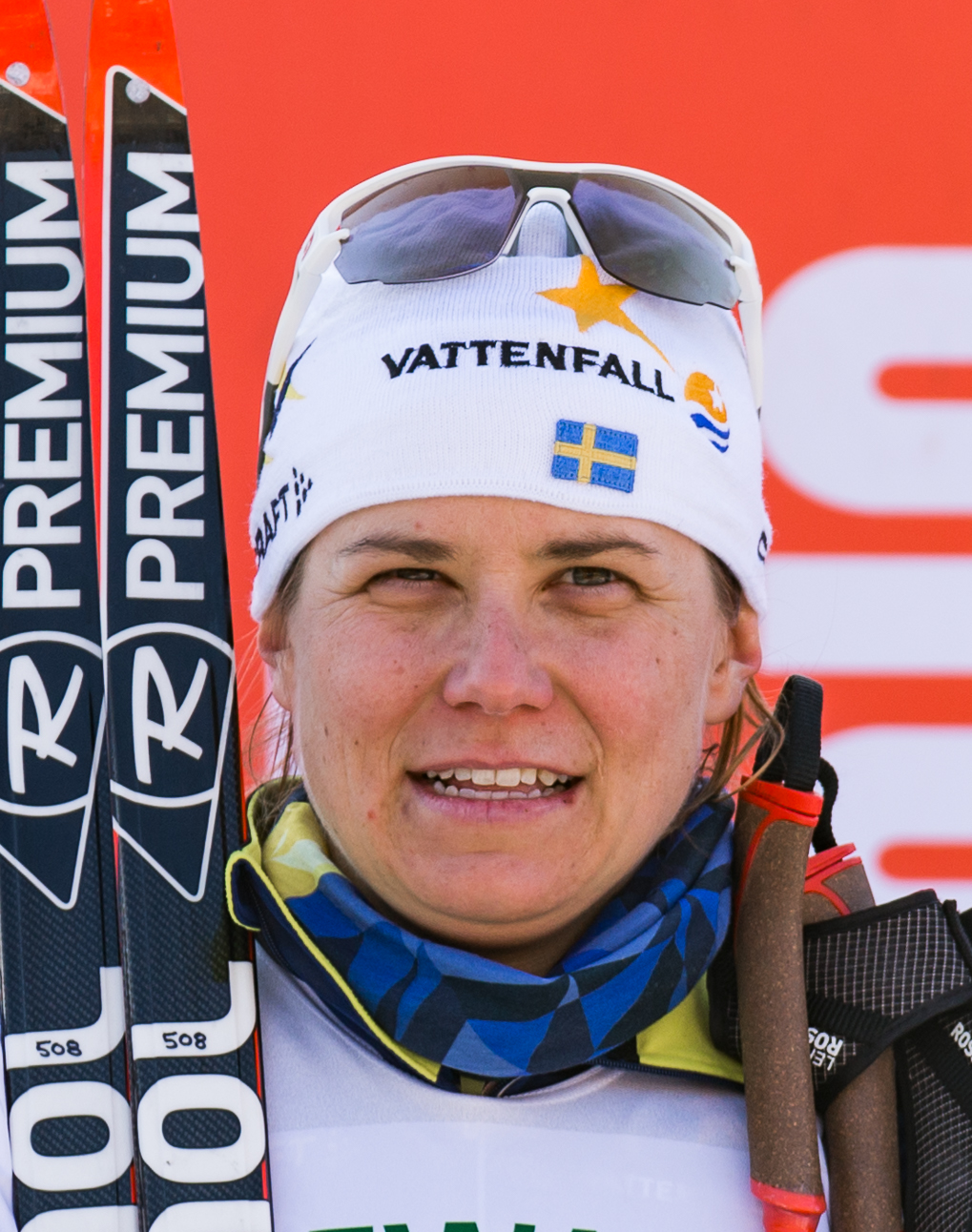
- Ida Ingemarsdotter during World Cup competitions in Dresden, Saxony, Germany in January 2018

Personal information
- Full name: Ida Maria Erika Ingemarsdotter
- Nationality: Sweden
- Born: 26 April 1985 (age 41) Sveg, Sweden
- Height: 1.74 m (5 ft 9 in)

Sport
- Sport: Skiing
- Club: Åsarna IK

World Cup career
- Seasons: 15 – (2004, 2006–2019)
- Indiv. starts: 209
- Indiv. podiums: 9
- Indiv. wins: 2
- Team starts: 26
- Team podiums: 10
- Team wins: 5
- Overall titles: 0 – (12th in 2016)
- Discipline titles: 0
Medal record
Women's cross-country skiing
Representing Sweden
International nordic ski competitions
Event	1st	2nd	3rd
Olympic Games	1	0	1
World Championships	1	5	0
Total	2	5	1
Olympic Games
Gold medal – first place	2014 Sochi	4 × 5 km relay
Bronze medal – third place	2014 Sochi	Team sprint
World Championships
Gold medal – first place	2011 Oslo	Team sprint
Silver medal – second place	2011 Oslo	4 × 5 km relay
Silver medal – second place	2013 Val di Fiemme	Individual sprint
Silver medal – second place	2013 Val di Fiemme	Team sprint
Silver medal – second place	2013 Val di Fiemme	4 × 5 km relay
Silver medal – second place	2015 Falun	Team sprint
U23 World Championships
Silver medal – second place	2008 Mals	Individual sprint
Junior World Championships
Silver medal – second place	2004 Stryn	Individual sprint
Bronze medal – third place	2005 Rovaniemi	Individual sprint

Ida Maria Erika Ingemarsdotter (born 26 April 1985) is a Swedish cross-country skiing coach and former skier who competed between 2003 and 2019.

== Skiing career ==
Ingemarsdotter has a total of five individual victories at various levels up to 15 km since 2003. Her best individual World Cup finish, was first place in a sprint event in Milan in 2012.

At the 2010 Winter Olympics in Vancouver, she finished fifth in the 4 × 5 km relay, 15th in the individual sprint, and 42nd in the 7.5 km + 7.5 km double pursuit events. Ingermarsdotter also competed in the 30 km event, but did not finish. At the 2014 Winter Olympics, Ingemarsdotter won gold in the 4 × 5 km relay.

She announced her retirement from cross-country skiing on 3 May 2019.

== Coaching career ==
On 30 September 2019 she was appointed as a coach for the Swedish National Development Cross-Country Team, substituting for Martina Höök, who will be on maternity leave for the 2019–20 season.

== Cross-country skiing results ==
All results are sourced from the International Ski Federation (FIS).

=== Olympic Games ===
- 2 medals – (1 gold, 1 bronze)

Year	Age	10 km individual	15 km skiathlon	30 km mass start	Sprint	4 × 5 km relay	Team sprint
2010	24	—	42	DNF	15	5	—
2014	28	—	—	—	5	Gold	Bronze
2018	32	34	—	—	13	—	—

=== World Championships ===
- 4 medals – (3 silver, 1 bronze)

Year	Age	10 km individual	15 km skiathlon	30 km mass start	Sprint	4 × 5 km relay	Team sprint
2009	23	—	—	—	4	—	—
2011	25	28	—	—	12	Silver	Gold
2013	27	—	—	—	Silver	Silver	Silver
2015	29	—	—	—	12	—	Silver
2017	31	17	—	—	5	—	4
2019	33	33	11	13	—	—	—

=== World Cup ===
==== Season standings ====
Season	Age	Discipline standings			Ski Tour standings			
Season	Age	Overall	Distance	Sprint	Nordic Opening	Tour de Ski	World Cup Final	Ski Tour Canada
2004	19	86	—	53	—N/a	—N/a	—N/a	—N/a
2006	21	65	—	36	—N/a	—N/a	—N/a	—N/a
2007	22	50	NC	27	—N/a	—	—N/a	—N/a
2008	23	41	NC	26	—N/a	—	—	—N/a
2009	24	49	—	31	—N/a	—	—	—N/a
2010	25	15	54	6	—N/a	DNF	20	—N/a
2011	26	18	27	16	17	—	10	—N/a
2012	27	22	52	6	26	28	DNF	—N/a
2013	28	32	64	10	—	—	DNF	—N/a
2014	29	37	71	15	20	—	28	—N/a
2015	30	21	35	12	12	—	—N/a	—N/a
2016	31	12	9	6	4	12	—N/a	DNF
2017	32	15	28	8	21	—	4	—N/a
2018	33	18	18	12	9	—	21	—N/a
2019	34	15	15	6	12	DNF	15	—N/a

==== Individual podiums ====
- 2 victories – (2 WC)
- 9 podiums – (6 WC, 3 SWC)

No.	Season	Date	Location	Race	Level	Place
1	2009–10	6 February 2010	Canmore, Canada	1.45 km Sprint C	World Cup	2nd
2	2011–12	18 December 2011	Rogla, Slovenia	1.0 km Sprint F	World Cup	3rd
3	2011–12	14 January 2012	Milan, Italy	1.4 km Sprint F	World Cup	1st
4	2011–12	17 February 2012	Szklarska Poręba, Poland	1.6 km Sprint F	World Cup	1st
5	2012–13	8 December 2012	Quebec City, Canada	1.6 km Sprint F	World Cup	3rd
6	2015–16	28 November 2015	Rukatunturi, Finland	5 km Individual F	Stage World Cup	3rd
7	2015–16	1 January 2016	Lenzerheide, Switzerland	1.5 km Sprint F	Stage World Cup	2nd
8	2018–19	24 November 2018	Rukatunturi, Finland	1.4 km Sprint C	World Cup	3rd
9	2018–19	29 December 2018	Toblach, Italy	1.3 km Sprint F	Stage World Cup	2nd

==== Team podiums ====
- 5 victories – (5 TS)
- 11 podiums – (9 TS, 2 RL)

No.	Season	Date	Location	Race	Level	Place	Teammate(s)
1	2009–10	6 December 2009	Düsseldorf, Germany	6 × 0.8 km Team Sprint F	World Cup	2nd	Falk
2	2011–12	15 January 2012	Milan, Italy	6 × 1.4 km Team Sprint F	World Cup	1st	Brodin
3	2012–13	25 November 2012	Gällivare, Sweden	4 × 5 km Relay C/F	World Cup	2nd	Bleckur / Larsen / Kalla
4	2012–13	13 January 2013	Liberec, Czech Republic	6 × 0.85 km Team Sprint F	World Cup	2nd	Nilsson
5	2014–15	18 January 2015	Otepää, Estonia	6 × 1.2 km Team Sprint F	World Cup	1st	Nilsson
6	2015–16	17 January 2016	Planica, Slovenia	6 × 1.2 km Team Sprint F	World Cup	1st	Nilsson
7	2016–17	15 January 2017	Toblach, Italy	6 × 1.3 km Team Sprint F	World Cup	2nd	Falk
8	2016–17	22 January 2017	Ulricehamn, Sweden	4 × 5 km Relay C/F	World Cup	3rd	Henriksson / Kalla / Falk
9	2017–18	14 January 2018	Dresden, Germany	6 × 1.3 km Team Sprint F	World Cup	1st	Dahlqvist
10	2018–19	13 January 2019	Dresden, Germany	6 × 1.6 km Team Sprint F	World Cup	2nd	Sundling
11	2018–19	10 February 2019	Lahti, Finland	6 × 1.4 km Team Sprint C	World Cup	1st	Dahlqvist

Awards
Preceded by Johan Olsson	Svenska Dagbladet Gold Medal; 2014 (with Emma Wikén, Anna Haag & Charlotte Kalla)	Succeeded by Sarah Sjöström
