= Sophie Caldwell Hamilton =

American cross-country skier

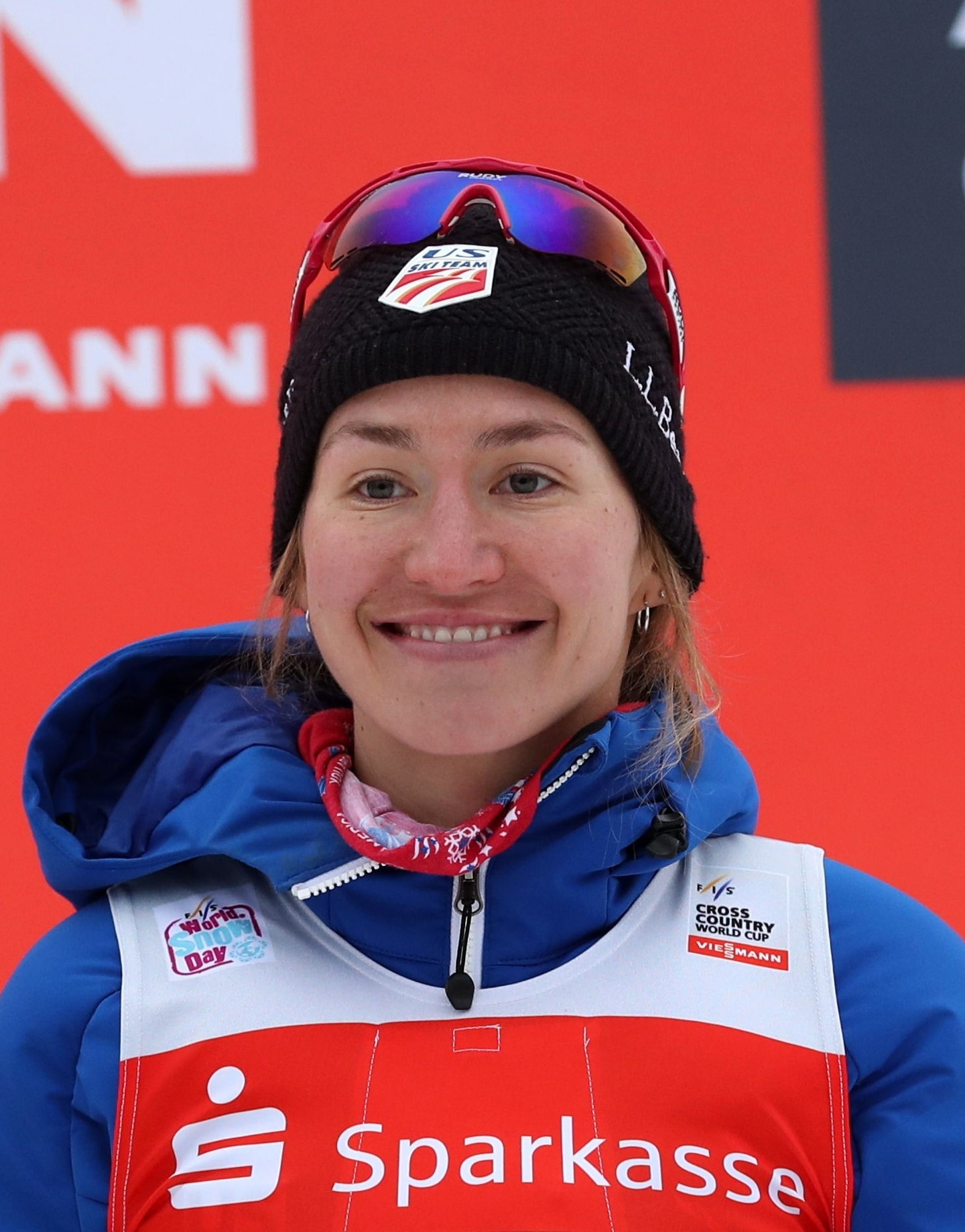
- Sophie Caldwell during World Cup competitions in Dresden, Saxony, Germany in January 2018

Personal information
- Nationality: United States
- Born: 22 March 1990 (age 36) Peru, Vermont, U.S.

Sport
- Sport: Skiing
- Club: Stratton Mountain School

World Cup career
- Seasons: 9 – (2013–2021)
- Indiv. starts: 139
- Indiv. podiums: 10
- Indiv. wins: 2
- Team starts: 19
- Team podiums: 4
- Team wins: 0
- Overall titles: 0 – (19th in 2018)
- Discipline titles: 0
- Updated on 2 November 2021

Sophia Shuell Caldwell Hamilton (born March 22, 1990) is a retired American cross-country ski racer who specialized in sprint disciplines. She won two races and achieved a total of 10 podiums in World Cup competition. Since 2019, Caldwell has been married to fellow US cross-country teammate Simeon Hamilton. On March 22, 2021, aged 31, she announced retirement from competitive skiing.

== Biography ==
=== Early years ===
Sophie Caldwell was born in 1990 in the small town of Peru, Vermont, to Lilly and Sverre Caldwell. Her paternal grandfather John Caldwell, uncle Tim Caldwell and cousin Patrick Caldwell (Tim Caldwell's son) are all Olympic skiers. Sophie attended the Stratton Mountain School in Stratton, Vermont, a preparatory high school with specialized skiing programs, where her father Sverre was the Nordic Director. She later majored in psychology at Dartmouth College in Hanover, New Hampshire, graduating in 2012. During her college years, she participated in the NCAA skiing championships. After graduating, she continued skiing professionally and joined the SMS T2 team in Stratton.

=== Athletic career ===
Caldwell made her debut in FIS Cross-Country World Cup in Quebec's sprints in December 2012 with 14th place in the individual competition. At the 2013 World Ski Championships in Val di Fiemme Caldwell finished 20th in classical style sprint. In 2014 in Lenzerheide, Switzerland, she placed sixth in the freestyle sprint. On March 1, 2014, Caldwell finished third in the Lahti, Finland freestyle sprint World Cup, for her first podium.

At the 2014 Sochi Winter Olympics, she finished sixth in the freestyle sprint. She was in position to contend for a medal midway through the final when Astrid Uhrenholdt Jacobsen poled between her legs, causing her to crash and taking her out of contention for a medal. She finished 12 seconds behind in sixth place. This is the best ever result by a female American cross-country skier.

Caldwell got her first victory in the World Cup during the 2016 edition of the Tour de Ski. She won the classic sprint in Oberstdorf, Germany on January 5, 2016. With this victory, Caldwell was only the second American woman with a victory in the World Cup, the other being Kikkan Randall. Caldwell is also the first American woman to win a classical World Cup event.

== Cross-country skiing results ==
All results are sourced from the International Ski Federation (FIS).

=== Olympic Games ===
Year	Age	10 km individual	15 km skiathlon	30 km mass start	Sprint	4 × 5 km relay	Team sprint
2014	23	30	—	—	6	—	7
2018	27	—	—	—	8	5	—

=== World Championships ===
Year	Age	10 km individual	15 km skiathlon	30 km mass start	Sprint	4 × 5 km relay	Team sprint
2015	23	—	—	—	10	—	8
2017	25	—	—	—	6	—	—
2019	27	29	—	—	14	—	—
2021	29	—	—	—	29	—	—

=== World Cup ===
==== Season standings ====
Season	Age	Discipline standings			Ski Tour standings				
Season	Age	Overall	Distance	Sprint	Nordic Opening	Tour de Ski	Ski Tour 2020	World Cup Final	Ski Tour Canada
2013	23	87	NC	53	—	—	—N/a	—	—N/a
2014	24	23	47	8	64	DNF	—N/a	39	—N/a
2015	25	53	NC	20	71	DNF	—N/a	—N/a	—N/a
2016	26	27	75	7	DNF	DNF	—N/a	—N/a	DNF
2017	27	33	NC	11	DNF	DNF	—N/a	36	—N/a
2018	28	19	61	3rd place, bronze medalist(s)	39	DNF	—N/a	36	—N/a
2019	29	21	NC	4	—	DNF	—N/a	36	—N/a
2020	30	25	69	6	DNF	DNF	44	—N/a	—N/a
2021	31	32	NC	10	57	DNF	—N/a	—N/a	—N/a

==== Individual podiums ====
- 2 victories – (1 WC, 1 SWC)
- 10 podiums – (7 WC, 3 SWC)

No.	Season	Date	Location	Race	Level	Place
1	2013–14	1 March 2014	Lahti, Finland	1.55 km Sprint F	World Cup	3rd
2	2015–16	5 January 2016	Oberstdorf, Germany	1.2 km Sprint C	Stage World Cup	1st
3	2017–18	1 March 2014	Lenzerheide, Switzerland	1.5 km Sprint F	Stage World Cup	2nd
4	2017–18	13 January 2018	Dresden, Germany	1.2 km Sprint F	World Cup	3rd
5	2017–18	27 January 2018	Seefeld, Austria	1.1 km Sprint F	World Cup	1st
6	2018–19	15 December 2018	Davos, Switzerland	1.5 km Sprint F	World Cup	2nd
7	2018–19	1 January 2019	Val Müstair, Switzerland	1.4 km Sprint F	Stage World Cup	2nd
8	2018–19	9 February 2019	Lahti, Finland	1.4 km Sprint F	World Cup	2nd
9	2019–20	14 December 2019	Davos, Switzerland	1.5 km Sprint F	World Cup	3rd
10	2020–21	19 December 2020	Dresden, Germany	1.3 km Sprint F	World Cup	2nd

==== Team podiums ====
- 4 podiums – (2 RL, 2 TS)

No.	Season	Date	Location	Race	Level	Place	Teammate(s)
1	2015–16	24 January 2016	Nové Město, Czech Republic	4 × 5 km Relay C/F	World Cup	2nd	Bjornsen / Stephen / Diggins
2	2016–17	5 February 2017	Pyeongchang, South Korea	6 × 1.4 km Team Sprint F	World Cup	3rd	Sargent
3	2017–18	13 January 2018	Dresden, Germany	6 × 1.3 km Team Sprint F	World Cup	3rd	Sargent
4	2019-20	8 December 2019	Lillehammer, Norway	4 × 5 km Relay C/F	World Cup	2nd	Maubet Bjornsen / Brennan / Diggins
