= Chad Salmela =

American biathlete

- Born: October 26, 1971 (age 54)
- Education: Middlebury College
- Occupations: Coach and Sports Analyst
- Employer: NBC

Chad Salmela is a former member of the U.S. biathlon team from 1990-1998. He currently is an analyst for NBC Olympics' biathlon and cross-country skiing.

Salmela has been an analyst for NBC since the 2006 Winter Olympics. Formerly, he was an athlete representative to the U.S. Biathlon Association's Board of Directors and the U.S. Olympic Committee Athletes Advisory Council from 2000-2008. He also serves as the coach of the NCAA varsity cross-country ski team, and assistant track and field coach at The College of St. Scholastica in Duluth, Minnesota.

Salmela was the broadcaster who memorably shouted "Here comes Diggins! Here comes Diggins!" and "Yes! Yes! Yes! Yes! Gold!” in the NBC broadcast of Jessie Diggins and Kikkan Randall's victory in the women's team sprint at the 2018 Winter Olympics in Pyeongchang, South Korea. Their victory marked the United States' first-ever Olympic cross-country skiing gold medal.

== See also ==
Olympics on NBC commentators
