= Alena Procházková =

Slovak cross-country skier

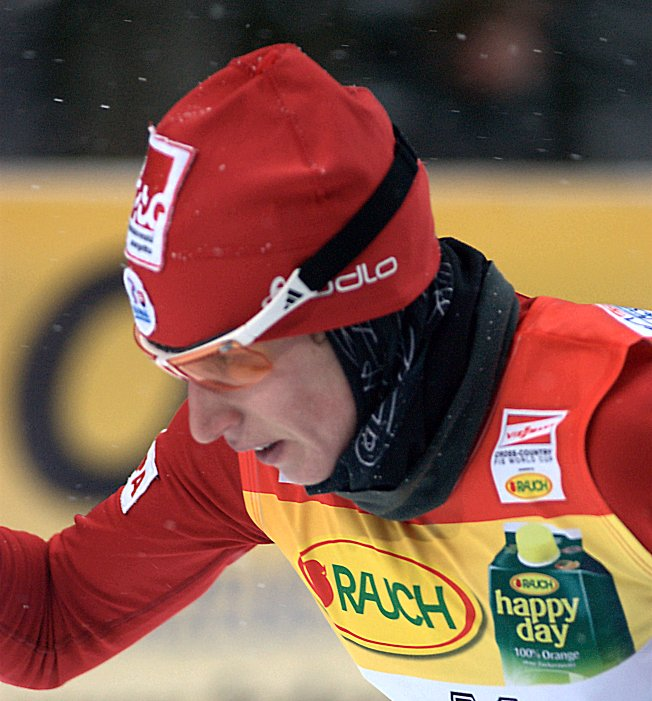
- Alena Procházková in 2010

Personal information
- Nationality: Slovakia
- Born: 9 August 1984 (age 41) Banská Bystrica, Czechoslovakia

Sport
- Sport: Skiing
- Club: LK Slavia UMB Banska Bystrica

World Cup career
- Seasons: 17 – (2005–present)
- Indiv. starts: 195
- Indiv. podiums: 6
- Indiv. wins: 1
- Team starts: 5
- Team podiums: 0
- Overall titles: 0 – (18th in 2009)
- Discipline titles: 0
Medal record
Women's cross-country skiing
Representing Slovakia
Junior World Championships
Gold medal – first place	2007 Tarvisio	Individual sprint
Winter Universiade
Gold medal – first place	2011 Erzurum	10 km pursuit
Gold medal – first place	2011 Erzurum	15 km freestyle
Gold medal – first place	2011 Erzurum	Individual sprint
Gold medal – first place	2011 Erzurum	Mixed team sprint
Silver medal – second place	2007 Turin	10 km pursuit
Silver medal – second place	2007 Turin	5 km freestyle
- Updated on 4 November 2021

Alena Procházková (born 9 August 1984) is a Slovak cross-country skier who has competed since 2002. Competing in four Winter Olympics, she earned her best finish of 18th in the individual sprint event at Vancouver in 2010.

Procházková's best finish at the FIS Nordic World Ski Championships was sixth place in the individual sprint in 2011.

Her lone World Cup victory was during the test event at Whistler Olympic Park in Canada which was a test event for the 2010 Winter Olympics.

== Cross-country skiing results ==
All results are sourced from the International Ski Federation (FIS).

=== Olympic Games ===
Year	Age	10 km individual	15 km skiathlon	30 km mass start	Sprint	4 × 5 km relay	Team sprint
2006	21	28	46	—	23	—	—
2010	25	—	—	—	18	—	—
2014	29	48	—	—	38	—	13
2018	33	58	—	36	31	—	18
2022	37	65	—	—	63	—	—

=== World Championships ===
Year	Age	10 km	15 km	Pursuit	30 km	Sprint	4 × 5 km relay	Team sprint
2003	18	49	—	62	—	—	—	—N/a
2005	20	58	—N/a	44	40	17	—	—
2007	22	34	—N/a	—	—	13	—	7
2009	24	—	—N/a	—	—	7	—	—
2011	26	DNS	—N/a	21	—	6	—	—
2013	28	66	—N/a	39	—	8	—	—
2015	30	35	—N/a	—	—	8	—	13
2017	32	22	—N/a	34	—	31	—	—
2019	34	32	—N/a	—	—	57	—	14
2021	36	53	—N/a	—	—	40	—	14

=== World Cup ===
==== Season standings ====
Season	Age	Discipline standings			Ski Tour standings				
Season	Age	Overall	Distance	Sprint	Nordic Opening	Tour de Ski	Ski Tour 2020	World Cup Final	Ski Tour Canada
2005	20	NC	NC	—	—N/a	—N/a	—N/a	—N/a	—N/a
2006	21	98	NC	63	—N/a	—N/a	—N/a	—N/a	—N/a
2007	22	73	60	60	—N/a	—	—N/a	—N/a	—N/a
2008	23	31	39	17	—N/a	25	—N/a	29	—N/a
2009	24	18	39	6	—N/a	26	—N/a	43	—N/a
2010	25	41	59	16	—N/a	DNF	—N/a	—	—N/a
2011	26	22	26	18	15	DNF	—N/a	26	—N/a
2012	27	64	NC	40	36	—	—N/a	—	—N/a
2013	28	51	65	28	33	—	—N/a	—	—N/a
2014	29	79	NC	49	DNF	—	—N/a	—	—N/a
2015	30	114	NC	74	DNF	—	—N/a	—N/a	—N/a
2016	31	44	40	36	54	DNF	—N/a	—N/a	26
2017	32	75	92	43	58	—	—N/a	—	—N/a
2018	33	NC	NC	NC	DNF	—	—N/a	—	—N/a
2019	34	NC	NC	NC	DNF	—	—N/a	—	—N/a
2020	35	NC	NC	NC	—	—	—	—N/a	—N/a
2021	36	122	NC	82	—	—	—N/a	—N/a	—N/a

==== Individual podiums ====
- 1 victory – (1 WC)
- 6 podiums – (5 WC, 1 SWC)

No.	Season	Date	Location	Race	Level	Place
1	2007–08	1 December 2007	Rukatunturi, Finland	1.2 km Sprint C	World Cup	3rd
2	2008–09	16 January 2009	Whistler, Canada	1.3 km Sprint C	World Cup	1st
3	2008–09	12 March 2009	Trondheim, Norway	1.4 km Sprint C	World Cup	2nd
4	2009–10	28 November 2009	Rukatunturi, Finland	1.2 km Sprint C	World Cup	3rd
5	2009–10	4 January 2010	Prague, Czech Republic	1.2 km Sprint F	Stage World Cup	3rd
6	2012–13	9 March 2013	Lahti, Finland	1.55 km Sprint F	World Cup	3rd
