= Célia Aymonier =

French biathlete and cross-country skier

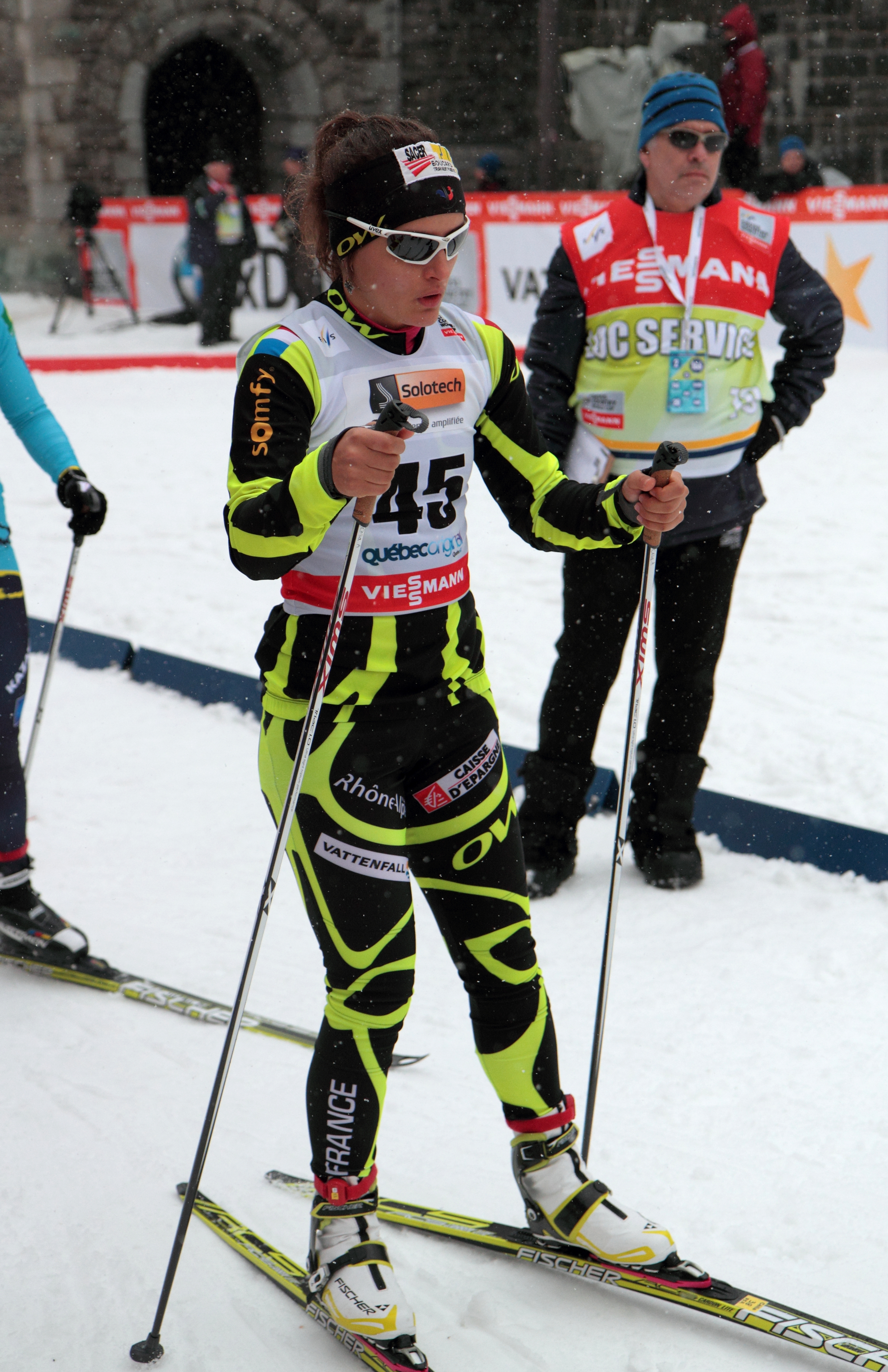
- Aymonier in Quebec in 2012

Personal information
- Born: 5 August 1991 (age 34) Pontarlier, France
- Height: 1.60 m (5 ft 3 in)
- Website: celiaymonier.fr

Sport

Professional information
- Sport: Biathlon; Cross-country skiing
- Club: EMHM – Les Fourgs
- Skis: Fischer
- World Cup debut: 18 December 2010

Olympic Games
- Teams: 1 (2018) (biathlon); 1 (2014) (skiing)
- Medals: 0

World Championships
- Teams: 4 (2016-2020) (biathlon); 2 (2013, 2015) (skiing)
- Medals: 1

World Cup
- Seasons: 5 (2015/16-2019/20) (biathlon); 4 (2010/11, 2012/13–2014/15) (skiing)
- All victories: 3
Medal record
Representing France
Women's biathlon
World Championships
Bronze medal – third place	2017 Hochfilzen	4 × 6 km relay
Women's cross-country skiing
U23 World Championships
Silver medal – second place	2014 Val di Fiemme	10 km classical

Célia Aymonier (born 5 August 1991) is a former French cross-country skier and biathlete. She competed as a cross-country skier at the 2014 Winter Olympics in Sochi, competing in the skiathlon and the 10 km classical.

Ahead of the 2015–16 season, Aymonier changed sport to biathlon and became a part of the French elite biathlon team. She competed at the 2018 Winter Olympics. She retired after the 2019–20 season.

== Biathlon results ==
=== Olympic Games ===
Event	Individual	Sprint	Pursuit	Mass start	Relay	Mixed relay
(South Korea) 2018 Pyeongchang	48th	—	—	—	—	—

=== World Championships ===
1 medal (1 bronze)

Event	Individual	Sprint	Pursuit	Mass start	Relay	Mixed relay	Single mixed relay
(Norway) 2016 Oslo Holmenkollen	—	64th	—	—	—	—	—N/a
(Austria) 2017 Hochfilzen	25th	9th	9th	17th	Bronze	—	—N/a
(Sweden) 2019 Östersund	20th	23rd	18th	20th	8th	—	—
(Italy) 2020 Antholz-Anterselva	28th	15th	30th	11th	14th	—	—

*The single mixed relay was added as an event in 2019.

=== World Cup ===
World Cup rankings

Season	Overall		Individual		Sprint		Pursuit		Mass start	
Season	Points	Position	Points	Position	Points	Position	Points	Position	Points	Position
2015–16	-	48th	-	61st	-	39th	-	47th	-	36th
2016–17	-	22nd	-	49th	-	12th	-	15th	-	32nd
2017–18	-	24th	-	44th	-	23rd	-	27th	-	23rd
2018–19	-	24th	-	31st	-	16th	-	18th	-	31st
2019–20	-	28th	-	37th	-	22nd	-	27th	-	35th

Relay victories

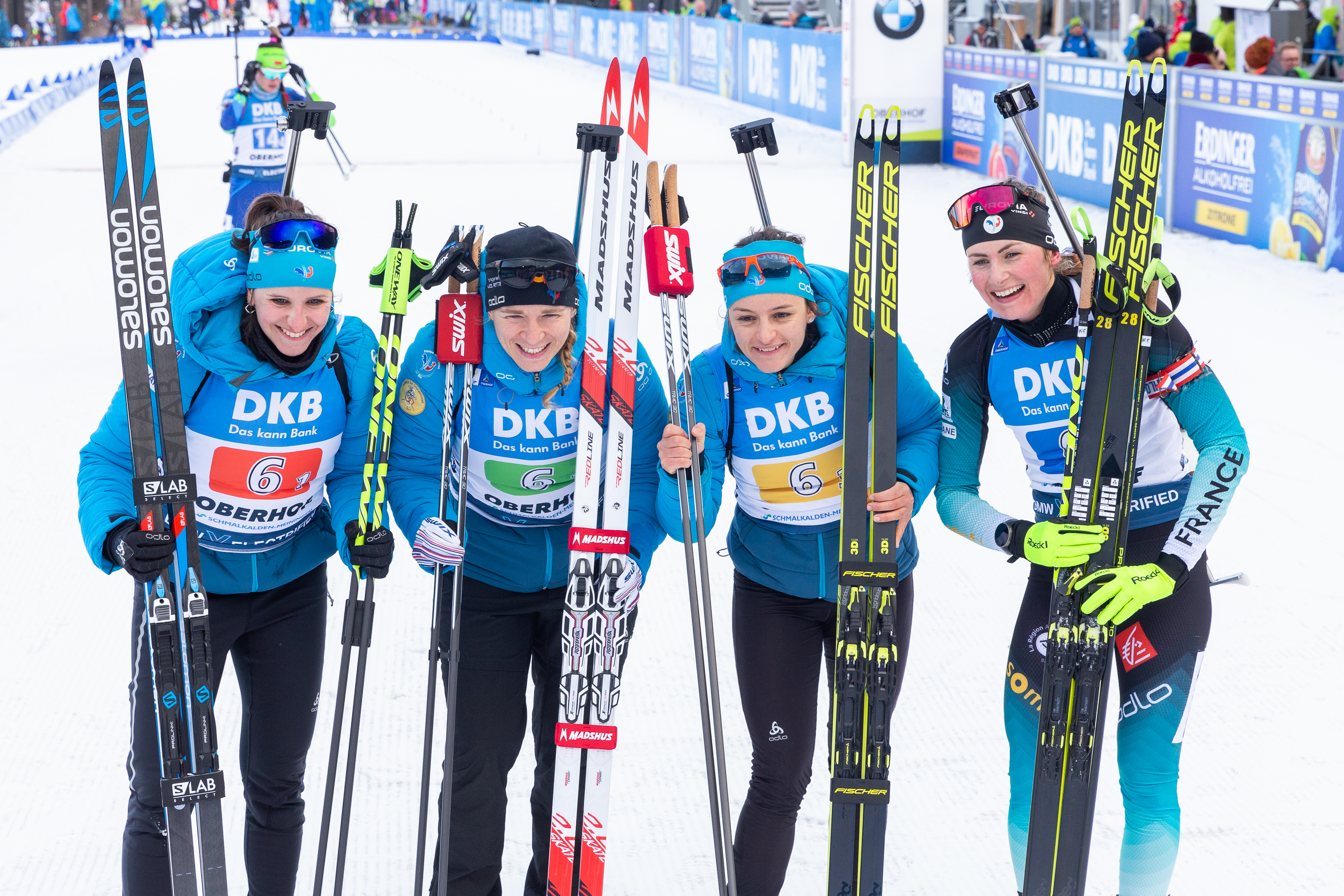
Simon / Bescond / Aymonier / Braisaz finishing 3rd at Oberhof on 11th January 2020

3 victories

No.	Season	Date	Location	Discipline	Level	Team
1	2017–18	7 January 2018	(Germany) Oberhof	Relay	Biathlon World Cup	Bescond / Chevalier / Aymonier / Braisaz
2	2017–18	17 March 2018	(Norway) Oslo Holmenkollen	Relay	Biathlon World Cup	Chevalier / Aymonier / Dorin Habert / Bescond
3	2018–19	17 February 2019	(United States) Salt Lake City	Mixed Relay	Biathlon World Cup	Fillon Maillet / Desthieux / Aymonier / Chevalier

== Cross-country skiing results ==
All results are sourced from the International Ski Federation (FIS).

=== Olympic Games ===
Year	Age	10 km individual	15 km skiathlon	30 km mass start	Sprint	4 × 5 km relay	Team sprint
2014	22	25	20	—	39	4	11

=== World Championships ===
Year	Age	10 km individual	15 km skiathlon	30 km mass start	Sprint	4 × 5 km relay	Team sprint
2013	21	—	36	—	36	6	10
2015	23	18	—	27	28	8	6

=== World Cup ===
Season standings

Season	Age	Discipline standings			Ski Tour standings		
Season	Age	Overall	Distance	Sprint	Nordic Opening	Tour de Ski	World Cup Final
2011	19	NC	NC	—	—	—	—
2013	21	56	46	55	—	DNF	—
2014	22	64	46	63	26	32	—
2015	23	37	32	24	—	30	—N/a
