= FIS Nordic World Ski Championships 2017 – Women's sprint =

Women's sprint at the FIS Nordic World Ski Championships 2017
- Location: Lahti, Finland
- Date: 23 February
- Competitors: 107 from 40 nations
- Winning time: 3:02.34

Medalists
gold medal	Maiken Caspersen Falla	Norway
silver medal	Jessie Diggins	United States
bronze medal	Kikkan Randall	United States

The Women's sprint event of the FIS Nordic World Ski Championships 2017 was held on 23 February 2017.

== Results ==
=== Qualification ===
The qualification was held at 15:00.

Rank	Bib	Athlete	Country	Time	Deficit	Note
1	16	Maiken Caspersen Falla	Norway	3:03.14		Q
2	24	Mari Laukkanen	Finland	3:05.51	+2.37	Q
3	22	Katja Višnar	Slovenia	3:05.56	+2.42	Q
4	5	Hanna Falk	Sweden	3:05.95	+2.81	Q
5	8	Laurien van der Graaff	Switzerland	3:06.31	+3.17	Q
6	18	Hanna Kolb	Germany	3:06.57	+3.43	Q
7	21	Kathrine Harsem	Norway	3:06.66	+3.52	Q
8	7	Marit Bjørgen	Norway	3:07.04	+3.90	Q
9	6	Stina Nilsson	Sweden	3:07.10	+3.96	Q
10	15	Kikkan Randall	United States	3:07.59	+4.45	Q
11	1	Natalya Matveyeva	Russia	3:08.06	+4.92	Q
12	26	Sofie Krehl	Germany	3:08.17	+5.03	Q
13	4	Sophie Caldwell	United States	3:08.80	+5.66	Q
14	17	Heidi Weng	Norway	3:09.90	+6.76	Q
15	19	Sandra Ringwald	Germany	3:09.99	+6.85	Q
16	12	Vesna Fabjan	Slovenia	3:10.11	+6.97	Q
17	3	Gaia Vuerich	Italy	3:10.42	+7.28	Q
18	25	Alenka Čebašek	Slovenia	3:10.46	+7.32	Q
19	2	Jessie Diggins	United States	3:11.11	+7.97	Q
20	20	Yuliya Belorukova	Russia	3:11.13	+7.99	Q
21	31	Anna Dyvik	Sweden	3:11.33	+8.19	Q
22	11	Ida Ingemarsdotter	Sweden	3:11.57	+8.43	Q
23	10	Ilaria Debertolis	Italy	3:11.63	+8.49	Q
24	32	Yelena Soboleva	Russia	3:11.98	+8.84	Q
25	13	Ingvild Flugstad Østberg	Norway	3:12.10	+8.96	Q
26	29	Victoria Carl	Germany	3:12.26	+9.12	Q
27	9	Ida Sargent	United States	3:12.51	+9.37	Q
28	27	Greta Laurent	Italy	3:12.76	+9.62	Q
29	23	Nadine Fähndrich	Switzerland	3:13.05	+9.91	Q
30	14	Anamarija Lampič	Slovenia	3:13.13	+9.99	Q
31	28	Alena Procházková	Slovakia	3:13.15	+10.01	
32	36	Katri Lylynperä	Finland	3:15.26	+12.12	
33	38	Karolína Grohová	Czech Republic	3:15.46	+12.32	
34	43	Susanna Saapunki	Finland	3:15.62	+12.48	
35	34	Petra Nováková	Czech Republic	3:15.90	+12.76	
36	51	Lisa Unterweger	Austria	3:16.22	+13.08	
37	33	Dahria Beatty	Canada	3:16.80	+13.66	
38	45	Annika Taylor	United Kingdom	3:17.13	+13.99	
39	53	Sandra Schützová	Czech Republic	3:17.31	+14.17	
40	37	Andrea Julin	Finland	3:17.38	+14.24	
41	41	Polina Seronosova	Belarus	3:18.29	+15.15	
42	35	Yulia Tikhonova	Belarus	3:18.84	+15.70	
43	47	Anna Shevchenko	Kazakhstan	3:19.11	+15.97	
44	30	Polina Kovaleva	Russia	3:19.62	+16.48	
45	39	Jessica Yeaton	Australia	3:19.63	+16.49	
46	52	Barbara Jezeršek	Australia	3:20.65	+17.51	
47	69	Tímea Lőrincz	Romania	3:22.96	+19.82	
48	42	Cendrine Browne	Canada	3:23.56	+20.42	
49	44	Mathilde-Amivi Petitjean	Togo	3:24.14	+21.00	
50	40	Vedrana Malec	Croatia	3:24.82	+21.68	
51	46	Anna Stoyan	Kazakhstan	3:25.27	+22.13	
52	49	Ewelina Marcisz	Poland	3:25.37	+22.23	
53	70	Emőke Szőcs	Hungary	3:26.34	+23.20	
54	58	Olga Mandrika	Kazakhstan	3:27.02	+23.88	
55	54	Irina Bykova	Kazakhstan	3:27.04	+23.90	
56	59	Patrīcija Eiduka	Latvia	3:28.31	+25.17	
57	64	Mariel Pulles	Estonia	3:28.54	+25.40	
58	48	Katherine Stewart-Jones	Canada	3:29.43	+26.29	
59	63	Aimee Watson	Australia	3:31.33	+28.19	
60	50	Laura Alba	Estonia	3:31.45	+28.31	
61	67	Elsa Guðrún Jónsdóttir	Iceland	3:33.99	+30.85	
62	57	Inga Paškovska	Latvia	3:35.44	+32.30	
63	55	Tetyana Antypenko	Ukraine	3:36.13	+32.99	
64	107	Alla Ghilenko	Moldova	3:38.66	+35.52	
65	73	Nansi Okoro	Bulgaria	3:40.34	+37.20	
66	101	Tanja Karišik	Bosnia and Herzegovina	3:41.48	+38.34	
67	68	Gabrijela Skender	Croatia	3:41.94	+38.80	
68	56	Katerina Paul	Australia	3:42.53	+39.39	
69	79	Dejana Košarac	Bosnia and Herzegovina	3:42.96	+39.82	
70	66	Yuliya Krol	Ukraine	3:43.58	+40.44	
71	103	Anastasia Niciporenko	Moldova	3:43.77	+40.63	
72	71	Natalija Kovalova	Latvia	3:46.72	+43.58	
73	61	Jaqueline Mourão	Brazil	3:47.34	+44.20	
74	62	Anda Muižniece	Latvia	3:47.68	+44.54	
75	78	Fern Cates	United Kingdom	3:49.81	+46.67	
76	90	Viktorija Todorovska	Macedonia	3:50.06	+46.92	
77	82	Martyna Biliūnaite	Lithuania	3:52.15	+49.01	
78	76	Hristina Miteva	Bulgaria	3:53.09	+49.95	
79	81	Bruna Moura	Brazil	3:53.15	+50.01	
80	75	Katya Galstyan	Armenia	3:54.85	+51.71	
81	84	Sanja Kusmuk	Bosnia and Herzegovina	3:55.63	+52.49	
82	77	Vanesa Emilova	Bulgaria	4:00.54	+57.40	
83	74	Anna Mkhitaryan	Armenia	4:01.22	+58.08	
84	91	Georgia Nimpiti	Greece	4:05.24	+1:02.10	
85	93	Anastasija Vojinović	Serbia	4:09.14	+1:06.00	
86	80	Elisavet Anastasiadou	Greece	4:09.24	+1:06.10	
87	94	Inesa Zekić	Serbia	4:09.67	+1:06.53	
88	92	Rafaela Mavroudi	Greece	4:14.43	+1:11.29	
89	85	Ágnes Simon	Hungary	4:14.50	+1:11.36	
90	99	Marija Kolaroska	Macedonia	4:14.99	+1:11.85	
91	97	Sára Pónya	Hungary	4:16.52	+1:13.38	
92	95	Marija Bulatović	Montenegro	4:16.79	+1:13.65	
93	87	Claudia Salcedo	Chile	4:20.23	+1:17.09	
94	89	Mirlene Picin	Brazil	4:20.97	+1:17.83	
95	96	Viktória Zámbó	Hungary	4:21.45	+1:18.31	
96	104	Valentina Mirza	Moldova	4:21.82	+1:18.68	
97	88	Effrosyni Giannakoviti	Greece	4:25.05	+1:21.91	
98	65	Samaneh Beirami Baher	Iran	4:27.59	+1:24.45	
99	98	Viktorija Jovanovska	Macedonia	4:32.40	+1:29.26	
100	100	Ana Cvetanovska	Macedonia	4:42.84	+1:39.70	
101	72	Farzaneh Rezasoltani	Iran	4:45.88	+1:42.74	
102	105	Victoria Manica	Moldova	4:59.78	+1:56.64	
103	83	Azadeh Kiashemshaki	Iran	5:04.92	+2:01.78	
104	86	Gholnaz Savojiasl	Iran	5:33.82	+2:30.68	
105	108	Makeleta Stephan	Tonga	6:18.43	+3:15.29	
106	102	Mery Kayrouz	Lebanon	6:38.30	+3:35.16	
107	106	Laetitia Arida	Lebanon	7:01.32	+3:58.18	
—	60	Marija Kaznačenko	Lithuania	DNS		

=== Quarterfinals ===
The quarterfinals were started at 16:30. The top two placed and the two fastest skiers not placed first or second in their heat, qualified for the semifinals.

==== Quarterfinal 1 ====
Rank	Seed	Athlete	Country	Time	Deficit	Note
1	9	Stina Nilsson	Sweden	3:15.02		Q
2	13	Sophie Caldwell	United States	3:15.34	+0.32	Q
3	7	Kathrine Harsem	Norway	3:15.72	+0.70	
4	23	Ilaria Debertolis	Italy	3:15.90	+0.88	
5	26	Victoria Carl	Germany	3:19.44	+4.42	
6	24	Yelena Soboleva	Russia	3:20.01	+4.99	

==== Quarterfinal 2 ====
Rank	Seed	Athlete	Country	Time	Deficit	Note
1	1	Maiken Caspersen Falla	Norway	3:11.66		Q
2	4	Hanna Falk	Sweden	3:12.02	+0.38	Q
3	10	Kikkan Randall	United States	3:12.55	+0.91	q
4	30	Anamarija Lampič	Slovenia	3:12.99	+1.35	
5	29	Nadine Fähndrich	Switzerland	3:13.19	+1.55	
—	5	Laurien van der Graaff	Switzerland	DSQ		

==== Quarterfinal 3 ====
Rank	Seed	Athlete	Country	Time	Deficit	Note
1	11	Natalya Matveyeva	Russia	3:11.46		Q
2	2	Mari Laukkanen	Finland	3:12.01	+0.55	Q
3	6	Hanna Kolb	Germany	3:12.43	+0.97	q
4	18	Alenka Čebašek	Slovenia	3:12.82	+1.36	
5	27	Ida Sargent	United States	3:16.06	+4.60	
6	28	Greta Laurent	Italy	3:17.86	+6.40	

==== Quarterfinal 4 ====
Rank	Seed	Athlete	Country	Time	Deficit	Note
1	19	Jessie Diggins	United States	3:12.84		Q
2	20	Yuliya Belorukova	Russia	3:14.32	+1.48	Q
3	15	Sandra Ringwald	Germany	3:14.79	+1.95	
4	12	Sofie Krehl	Germany	3:15.12	+2.28	
5	3	Katja Višnar	Slovenia	3:15.25	+2.41	
6	21	Anna Dyvik	Sweden	3:15.53	+2.69	

==== Quarterfinal 5 ====
Rank	Seed	Athlete	Country	Time	Deficit	Note
1	22	Ida Ingemarsdotter	Sweden	3:13.44		Q
2	14	Heidi Weng	Norway	3:13.76	+0.35	Q
3	17	Gaia Vuerich	Italy	3:13.86	+0.45	
4	8	Marit Bjørgen	Norway	3:14.27	+0.86	
5	25	Ingvild Flugstad Østberg	Norway	3:14.65	+1.24	
6	16	Vesna Fabjan	Slovenia	3:15.04	+1.63	

=== Semifinals ===
The semifinals were started at 18:30. The top two placed and the two fastest skiers not placed first or second in their heat, qualified for the final.

==== Semifinal 1 ====
Rank	Seed	Athlete	Country	Time	Deficit	Note
1	1	Maiken Caspersen Falla	Norway	3:07.07		Q
2	10	Kikkan Randall	United States	3:07.48	+0.41	Q
3	13	Sophie Caldwell	United States	3:07.89	+0.82	q
4	4	Hanna Falk	Sweden	3:09.48	+2.41	q
5	11	Natalya Matveyeva	Russia	3:20.78	+13.71	
—	9	Stina Nilsson	Sweden	DSQ		

==== Semifinal 2 ====
Rank	Seed	Athlete	Country	Time	Deficit	Note
1	19	Jessie Diggins	United States	3:10.39		Q
2	22	Ida Ingemarsdotter	Sweden	3:10.62	+0.23	Q
3	14	Heidi Weng	Norway	3:10.72	+0.33	
4	2	Mari Laukkanen	Finland	3:11.05	+0.66	
5	20	Yuliya Belorukova	Russia	3:11.65	+1.26	
6	6	Hanna Kolb	Germany	3:12.47	+2.08	

=== Final ===
The final was started at 18:55.

Rank	Seed	Athlete	Country	Time	Deficit	Note
1st place, gold medalist(s)	1	Maiken Caspersen Falla	Norway	3:02.34		
2nd place, silver medalist(s)	19	Jessie Diggins	United States	3:04.00	+1.66	
3rd place, bronze medalist(s)	10	Kikkan Randall	United States	3:06.10	+3.76	
4	4	Hanna Falk	Sweden	3:06.25	+3.91	
5	22	Ida Ingemarsdotter	Sweden	3:06.76	+4.42	
6	13	Sophie Caldwell	United States	3:07.71	+5.37	
