= Gaia Vuerich =

Italian cross-country skier (born 1991)

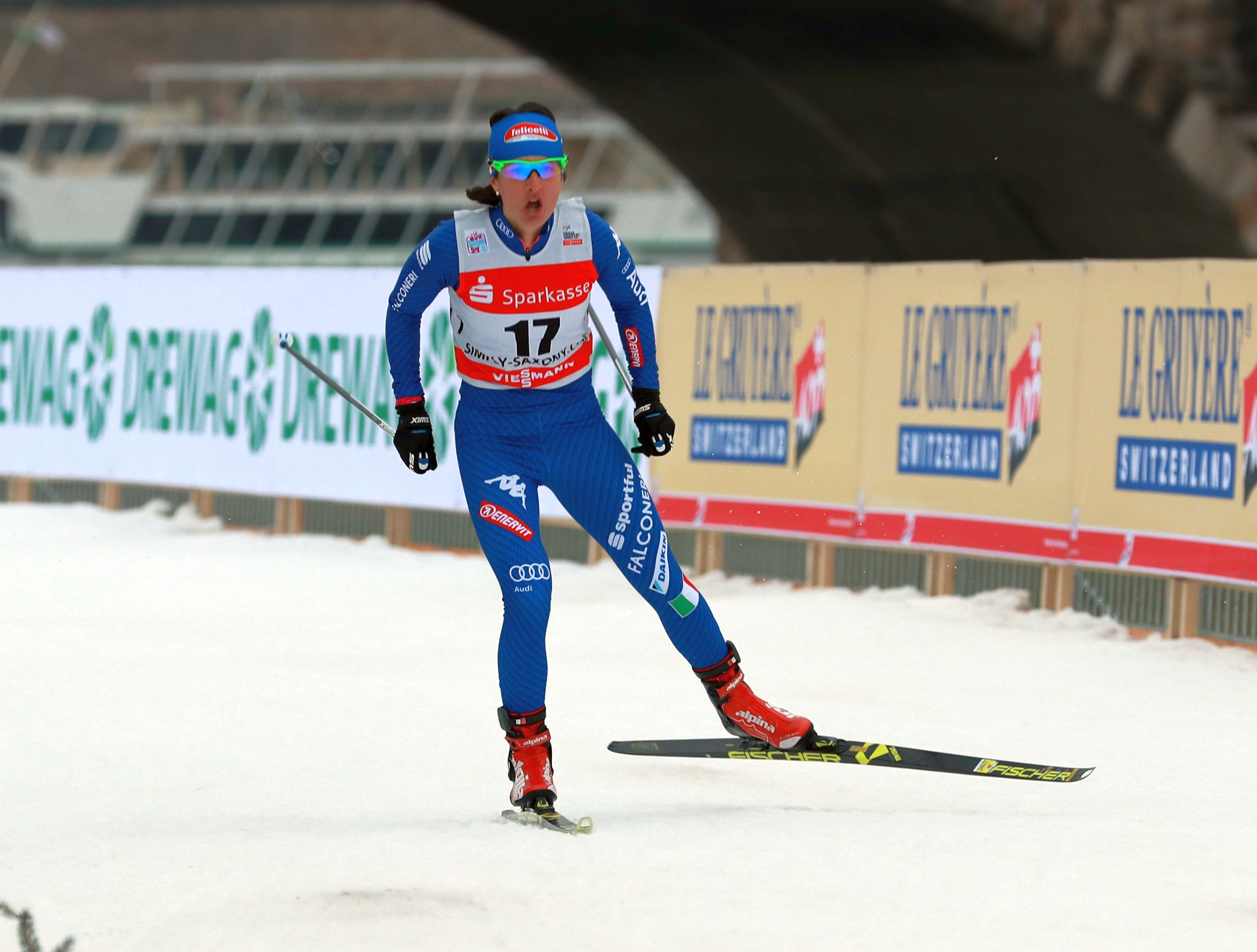
- Gaia Vuerich in Dresden, 2018

Personal information
- Nationality: Italy
- Born: 4 July 1991 (age 35) Cavalese, Italy

Sport
- Sport: Skiing
- Club: C.S. Carabinieri

World Cup career
- Seasons: 10 – (2009–2018)
- Indiv. starts: 73
- Indiv. podiums: 0
- Team starts: 11
- Team podiums: 0
- Overall titles: 0 – (27th in 2014)
- Discipline titles: 0
- Updated on 20 January 2019

Gaia Vuerich (born 4 July 1991) is an Italian cross-country skier. She competed at the 2011 Nordic World Ski Championships in Oslo, and at the 2013 Nordic World Ski Championships in Val di Fiemme. She competed at the 2014 Winter Olympics in Sochi, in the women's sprint.

== Cross-country skiing results ==
All results are sourced from the International Ski Federation (FIS).

=== Olympic Games ===
Year	Age	10 km individual	15 km skiathlon	30 km mass start	Sprint	4 × 5 km relay	Team sprint
2014	22	—	—	—	7	—	12
2018	26	—	—	—	21	—	15

=== World Championships ===
Year	Age	10 km individual	15 km skiathlon	30 km mass start	Sprint	4 × 5 km relay	Team sprint
2015	23	—	—	—	33	—	11
2017	25	—	—	—	15	—	—

=== World Cup ===
==== Season standings ====
Season	Age	Discipline standings			Ski Tour standings			
Season	Age	Overall	Distance	Sprint	Nordic Opening	Tour de Ski	World Cup Final	Ski Tour Canada
2009	18	128	—	88	—N/a	—	—	—N/a
2010	19	99	—	70	—N/a	—	—	—N/a
2011	20	113	—	78	—	—	—	—N/a
2012	21	59	—	36	—	—	—	—N/a
2013	22	85	—	50	—	—	—	—N/a
2014	23	27	NC	9	—	DNF	DNF	—N/a
2015	24	62	NC	29	DNF	DNF	—N/a	—N/a
2016	25	52	NC	33	—	DNF	—N/a	DNF
2017	26	62	—	30	DNF	DNF	—	—N/a
2018	27	64	—	35	—	DNF	DNF	—N/a
