= Anastasia Dotsenko =

Russian cross-country skier

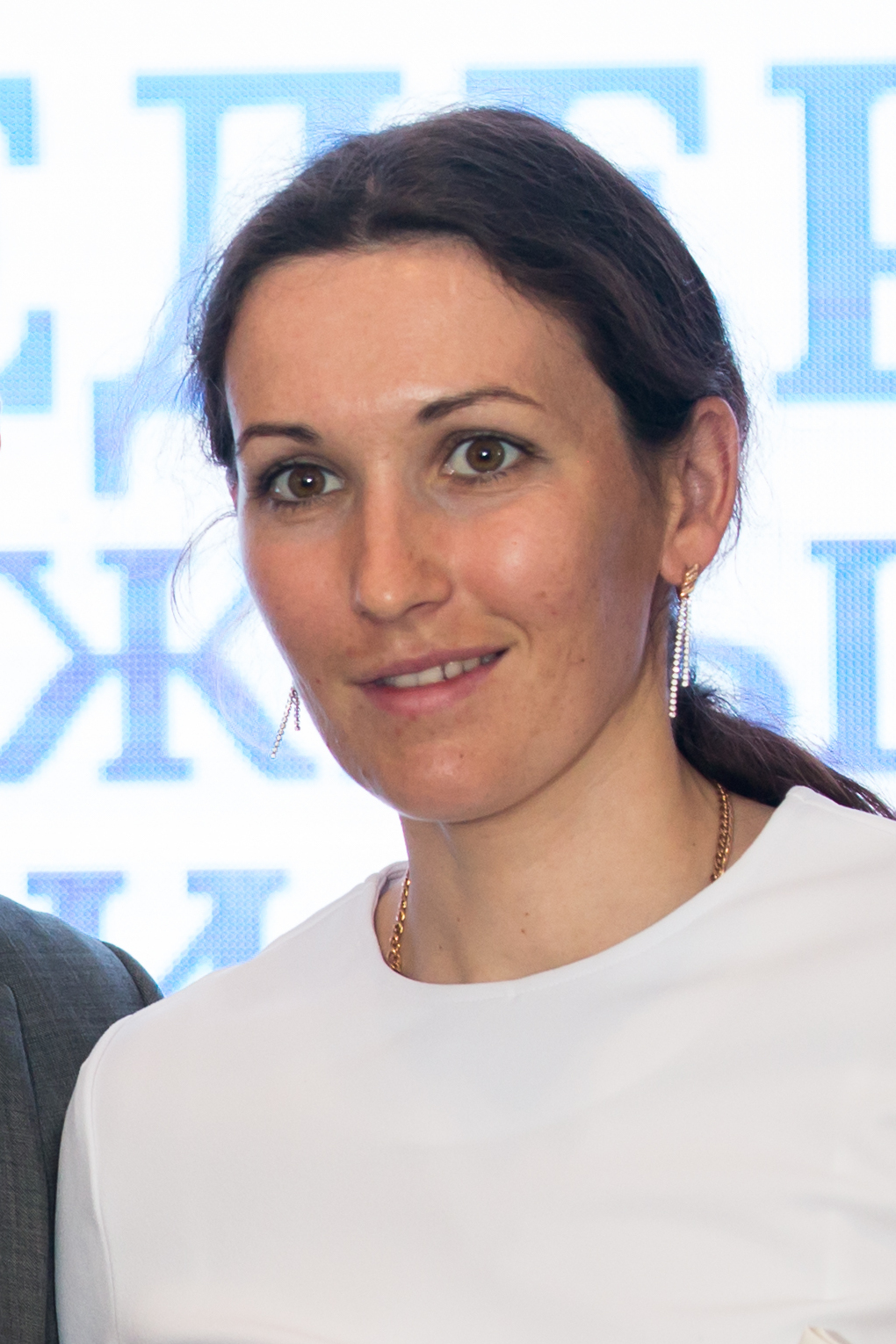

Personal information
- Nationality: Russia
- Born: 14 October 1986 (age 39) Zelenodolsk, Soviet Union

Sport
- Sport: Skiing

World Cup career
- Seasons: 7 – (2010–2016)
- Indiv. starts: 106
- Indiv. podiums: 2
- Indiv. wins: 0
- Team starts: 12
- Team podiums: 0
- Overall titles: 0 – (26th in 2012)
- Discipline titles: 0
- Updated on 28 May 2019

Anastasia Alexandrovna Dotsenko (Russian: Анастаси́я Алекса́ндровна Доце́нко) (born 14 October 1986 in Zelenodolsk) is a Russian cross-country skier. She competed at the FIS Nordic World Ski Championships 2011 in Oslo, and at the FIS Nordic World Ski Championships 2013 in Val di Fiemme. She competed at the 2014 Winter Olympics in Sochi, where she reached the quarter-finals in the ladies' sprint, and she was part of the Russian team that placed sixth in the team sprint, along with Yuliya Ivanova.

On 1 December 2017 she was disqualified from the 2014 Winter Olympics, as a result of a positive doping test.

== Cross-country skiing results ==
All results are sourced from the International Ski Federation (FIS).

=== Olympic Games ===
Year	Age	10 km individual	15 km skiathlon	30 km mass start	Sprint	4 × 5 km relay	Team sprint
2014	27	—	—	—	DSQ	—	DSQ

=== World Championships ===
Year	Age	10 km individual	15 km skiathlon	30 km mass start	Sprint	4 × 5 km relay	Team sprint
2011	24	—	—	32	30	—	10
2013	26	50	—	—	15	—	—
2015	28	—	—	26	14	7	5

=== World Cup ===
==== Season standings ====
Season	Age	Discipline standings			Ski Tour standings			
Season	Age	Overall	Distance	Sprint	Nordic Opening	Tour de Ski	World Cup Final	Ski Tour Canada
2010	23	129	—	95	—N/a	—	—	—N/a
2011	24	35	38	32	14	—	21	—N/a
2012	25	26	39	17	19	30	29	—N/a
2013	26	34	40	23	DNF	27	19	—N/a
2014	27	57	70	31	DNF	—	—	—N/a
2015	28	33	46	14	22	—	—N/a	—N/a
2016	29	41	32	48	26	25	—N/a	—

==== Individual podiums ====
- 2 podiums – (1 WC, 1 SWC)

No.	Season	Date	Location	Race	Level	Place
1	2011–12	2 February 2012	Moscow, Russia	1.5 km Sprint F	World Cup	3rd
2	2012–13	30 November 2012	Rukatunturi, Finland	1.4 km Sprint C	Stage World Cup	3rd
