= Cross-country skiing at the 2014 Winter Olympics – Women's sprint =

Women's sprint at the XXII Olympic Winter Games
- Venue: Laura Biathlon & Ski Complex
- Dates: 11 February 2014
- Competitors: 67 from 31 nations
- Winning time: 2:35.49

Medalists
1st place, gold medalist(s)		Maiken Caspersen Falla	Norway
2nd place, silver medalist(s)		Ingvild Flugstad Østberg	Norway
3rd place, bronze medalist(s)		Vesna Fabjan	Slovenia

The women's freestyle sprint cross-country skiing competition in the free technique at the 2014 Sochi Olympics took place on 11 February at Laura Biathlon & Ski Complex.

== Qualification ==
An athlete with a maximum of 100 FIS distance points (the A standard) will be allowed to compete in both or one of the event (sprint/distance). An athlete with a maximum 120 FIS sprint points will be allowed to compete in the sprint event and 10 km for women or 15 km for men provided their distance points do not exceed 300 FIS points. NOC's who do not have any athlete meeting the A standard can enter one competitor of each sex (known as the basic quota) in only 10 km classical event for women or 15 km classical event for men. They must have a maximum of 300 FIS distance points at the end of qualifying on 20 January 2014. The qualification period began in July 2012.

== Results ==
Q — qualified for next round
LL — lucky loser
PF — photo finish

In November 2017, Yevgeniya Shapovalova, and later Natalya Matveyeva and Anastasia Dotsenko were disqualified from the event. In January 2018, Shapovalova and Matveyeva successfully appealed against the lifetime ban as well as decision to disqualify them from Sochi Olympics at the court of arbitration for sport. The disqualification of Dotsenko was upheld.

=== Qualifying ===
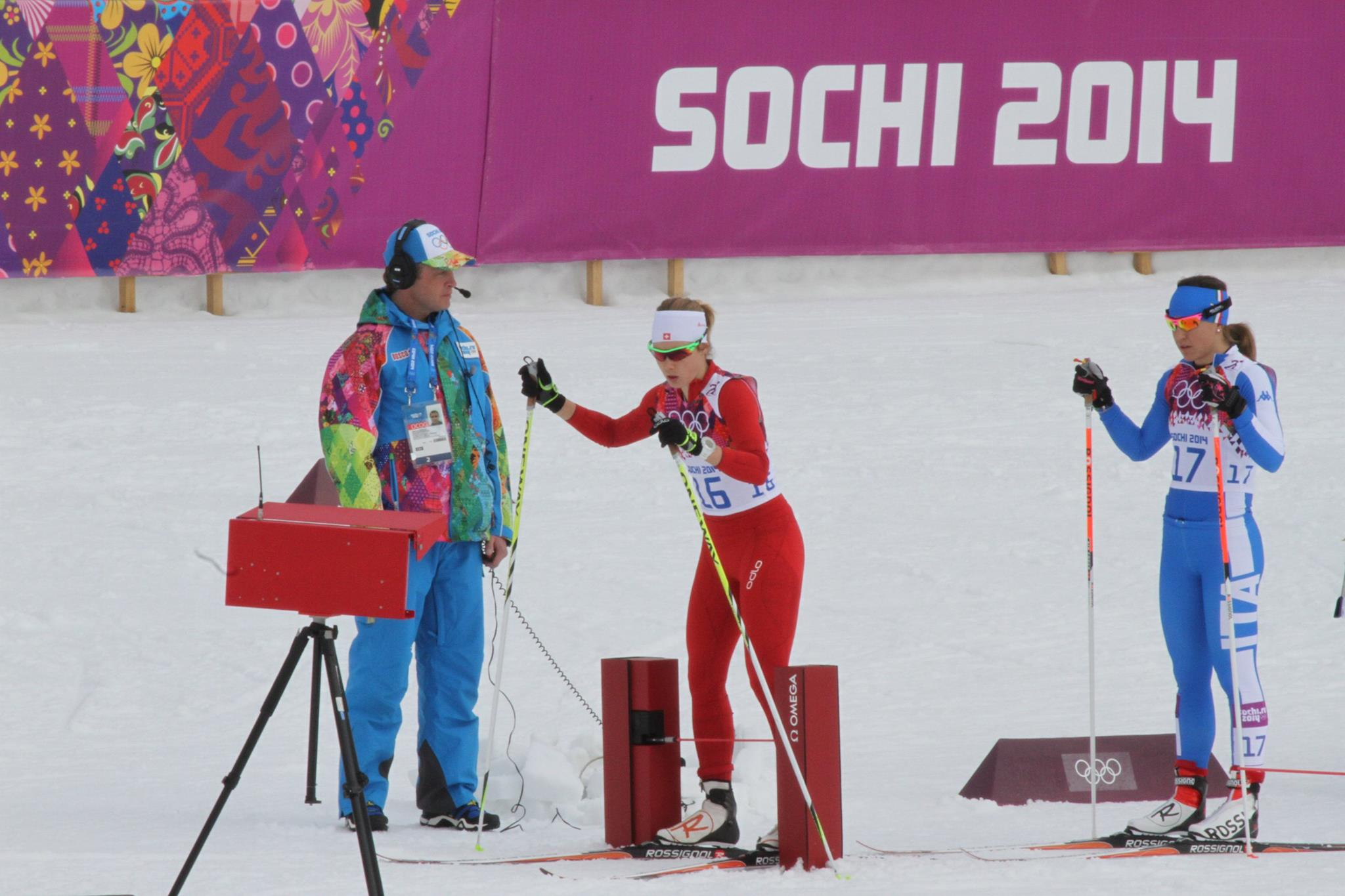
Laurien van der Graaff and Greta Laurent

Rank	Bib	Athlete	Country	Time	Deficit	Note
1	5	Maiken Caspersen Falla	Norway	2:32.07	—	Q
2	6	Katja Višnar	Slovenia	2:32.47	+0.40	Q
3	21	Marit Bjørgen	Norway	2:33.17	+1.10	Q
4	15	Vesna Fabjan	Slovenia	2:34.13	+2.06	Q
5	18	Ida Ingemarsdotter	Sweden	2:34.16	+2.09	Q
6	22	Ingvild Flugstad Østberg	Norway	2:34.18	+2.11	Q
7	10	Astrid Uhrenholdt Jacobsen	Norway	2:35.00	+2.93	Q
8	24	Denise Herrmann	Germany	2:35.11	+3.04	Q
9	19	Sophie Caldwell	United States	2:35.18	+3.11	Q
10	13	Stina Nilsson	Sweden	2:35.37	+3.30	Q
11	1	Anne Kyllönen	Finland	2:35.57	+3.50	Q
12	14	Jessie Diggins	United States	2:35.64	+3.57	Q
13	23	Gaia Vuerich	Italy	2:35.81	+3.74	Q
14	25	Alenka Čebašek	Slovenia	2:35.94	+3.87	Q
15	8	Britta Johansson Norgren	Sweden	2:35.98	+3.91	Q
16	17	Greta Laurent	Italy	2:36.30	+4.23	Q
17	27	Nika Razinger	Slovenia	2:36.55	+4.48	Q
18	11	Kikkan Randall	United States	2:36.67	+4.60	Q
19	12	Yevgeniya Shapovalova	Russia	2:37.03	+4.96	Q
20	16	Laurien van der Graaff	Switzerland	2:37.84	+5.77	Q
21	30	Aurore Jéan	France	2:37.96	+5.89	Q
DSQ	31	Anastasia Dotsenko	Russia	2:38.14	+6.07	Q
23	36	Perianne Jones	Canada	2:38.63	+6.56	Q
24	28	Mari Laukkanen	Finland	2:39.06	+6.99	Q
25	46	Petra Novaková	Czech Republic	2:39.44	+7.37	Q
26	2	Ida Sargent	United States	2:39.80	+7.73	Q
27	26	Daria Gaiazova	Canada	2:40.04	+7.97	Q
28	4	Mona-Liisa Malvalehto	Finland	2:40.08	+8.01	Q
29	9	Natalya Matveyeva	Russia	2:40.15	+8.08	Q
30	20	Hanna Kolb	Germany	2:40.17	+8.10	Q
31	32	Lucia Anger	Germany	2:40.22	+8.15	
32	39	Ilaria Debertolis	Italy	2:40.29	+8.22	
32	43	Man Dandan	China	2:40.29	+8.22	
34	55	Maryna Antsybor	Ukraine	2:40.55	+8.48	
35	35	Claudia Nystad	Germany	2:41.13	+9.06	
36	37	Marion Buillet	France	2:41.30	+9.23	
37	33	Riikka Sarasoja-Lilja	Finland	2:41.55	+9.48	
38	38	Karolina Grohová	Czech Republic	2:41.75	+9.68	
39	29	Alena Procházková	Slovakia	2:41.95	+9.88	
40	34	Celia Aymonier	France	2:42.57	+10.50	
41	40	Agnieszka Szymanczak	Poland	2:43.06	+10.99	
42	44	Rosamund Musgrave	Great Britain	2:43.31	+11.24	
43	41	Heidi Widmer	Canada	2:43.36	+11.29	
44	42	Chandra Crawford	Canada	2:43.59	+11.52	
45	57	Kateryna Serdyuk	Ukraine	2:44.12	+12.05	
46	54	Elena Kolomina	Kazakhstan	2:46.37	+14.30	
47	47	Valiantsina Kaminskaya	Belarus	2:46.76	+14.69	
48	45	Triin Ojaste	Estonia	2:47.07	+15.00	
49	62	Timea Sara	Romania	2:48.16	+16.09	
50	50	Irina Khazova	Russia	2:48.64	+16.57	
51	52	Li Hongxue	China	2:48.72	+16.65	
52	3	Hanna Erikson	Sweden	2:48.83	+16.76	
53	48	Nathalie Schwarz	Austria	2:49.54	+17.47	
54	60	Teodora Malcheva	Bulgaria	2:49.66	+17.59	
55	58	Daniela Kotschová	Slovakia	2:49.81	+17.74	
56	49	Esther Bottomley	Australia	2:50.54	+18.47	
57	53	Tatyana Ossipova	Kazakhstan	2:51.44	+19.37	
58	51	Maryna Lisohor	Ukraine	2:53.22	+21.15	
59	56	Inga Dauškane	Latvia	2:53.90	+21.83	
60	67	Antoniya Grigorova-Burgova	Bulgaria	2:54.31	+22.24	
61	59	Vedrana Malec	Croatia	2:54.60	+22.53	
62	61	Ingrida Ardišauskaitė	Lithuania	2:55.24	+23.17	
63	7	Sylwia Jaśkowiec	Poland	3:01.21	+29.14	
64	65	Panagiota Tsakiri	Greece	3:02.75	+30.68	
65	63	Jaqueline Mourão	Brazil	3:02.83	+30.76	
66	64	Ágnes Simon	Hungary	3:04.72	+32.65	
67	66	Kelime Çetinkaya	Turkey	3:05.00	+32.93	

=== Quarterfinals ===
Quarterfinal 1

Rank	Seed	Athlete	Country	Time	Deficit	Note
1	1	Maiken Caspersen Falla	Norway	2:33.23	—	Q
2	10	Stina Nilsson	Sweden	2:34.01	+0.78	Q
3	21	Aurore Jéan	France	2:35.55	+2.32	LL
4	11	Anne Kyllönen	Finland	2:37.07	+3.84	
5	20	Laurien van der Graaff	Switzerland	2:37.95	+4.72	
6	30	Hanna Kolb	Germany	2:38.43	+5.20	

Quarterfinal 2

Rank	Seed	Athlete	Country	Time	Deficit	Note
1	7	Astrid Uhrenholdt Jacobsen	Norway	2:37.01	—	Q
2	4	Vesna Fabjan	Slovenia	2:37.22	+0.21	Q
3	24	Mari Laukkanen	Finland	2:37.48	+0.47	
4	14	Alenka Čebašek	Slovenia	2:37.69	+0.68	
5	27	Daria Gaiazova	Canada	2:40.45	+3.44	
6	17	Nika Razinger	Slovenia	2:43.61	+6.60	

Quarterfinal 3

Rank	Seed	Athlete	Country	Time	Deficit	Note
1	6	Ingvild Flugstad Østberg	Norway	2:36.62	—	Q, PF
2	5	Ida Ingemarsdotter	Sweden	2:36.64	+0.02	Q, PF
3	15	Britta Johansson Norgren	Sweden	2:37.86	+1.24	
4	26	Ida Sargent	United States	2:39.05	+2.43	
5	25	Petra Novaková	Czech Republic	2:47.52	+10.90	
6	16	Greta Laurent	Italy	2:52.07	+15.45	

Quarterfinal 4

Rank	Seed	Athlete	Country	Time	Deficit	Note
1	2	Katja Višnar	Slovenia	2:36.45	—	Q
2	9	Sophie Caldwell	United States	2:37.21	+0.76	Q
3	12	Jessie Diggins	United States	2:38.06	+1.61	
4	29	Natalya Matveyeva	Russia	2:38.66	+2.21	
DSQ	22	Anastasia Dotsenko	Russia	2:38.83	+2.38	PF
6	19	Yevgeniya Shapovalova	Russia	2:38.83	+2.38	PF

Quarterfinal 5

Rank	Seed	Athlete	Country	Time	Deficit	Note
1	8	Denise Herrmann	Germany	2:34.87	—	Q
2	3	Marit Bjørgen	Norway	2:35.42	+0.55	Q
3	13	Gaia Vuerich	Italy	2:35.65	+0.78	LL
4	18	Kikkan Randall	United States	2:35.70	+0.83	
5	23	Perianne Jones	Canada	2:38.66	+3.79	
6	28	Mona-Liisa Malvalehto	Finland	2:41.20	+6.33	

=== Semifinals ===
Semifinal 1

Rank	Seed	Athlete	Country	Time	Deficit	Note
1	1	Maiken Caspersen Falla	Norway	2:35.80	—	Q
2	4	Vesna Fabjan	Slovenia	2:36.02	+0.22	Q, PF
3	5	Ida Ingemarsdotter	Sweden	2:36.05	+0.25	LL, PF
4	7	Astrid Uhrenholdt Jacobsen	Norway	2:36.32	+0.52	LL
5	10	Stina Nilsson	Sweden	2:36:42	+0.62	
6	21	Aurore Jéan	France	2:38.28	+2.48	

Semifinal 2

Rank	Seed	Athlete	Country	Time	Deficit	Note
1	6	Ingvild Flugstad Østberg	Norway	2:36.66	—	Q, PF
2	9	Sophie Caldwell	United States	2:36:67	+0.01	Q, PF
3	13	Gaia Vuerich	Italy	2:36.87	+0.21	
4	8	Denise Herrmann	Germany	2:36.94	+0.28	
5	2	Katja Višnar	Slovenia	2:37.76	+1.10	
6	3	Marit Bjørgen	Norway	2:52.27	+15.61	

=== Final ===
The final was held at 17:29.

Rank	Seed	Athlete	Country	Time	Deficit	Note
1st place, gold medalist(s)	1	Maiken Caspersen Falla	Norway	2:35.49	—	
2nd place, silver medalist(s)	6	Ingvild Flugstad Østberg	Norway	2:35.87	+0.38	PF
3rd place, bronze medalist(s)	4	Vesna Fabjan	Slovenia	2:35.89	+0.40	PF
4	7	Astrid Uhrenholdt Jacobsen	Norway	2:37.31	+1.82	
5	5	Ida Ingemarsdotter	Sweden	2:42.04	+6.55	
6	9	Sophie Caldwell	United States	2:47.75	+12.26	
