= FIS Nordic World Ski Championships 2015 – Women's team sprint =

Women's team sprint at the FIS Nordic World Ski Championships 2015
- Date: 22 February 2015
- Competitors: 38 from 19 nations
- Winning time: 14:29.57

Medalists
| gold medal | Ingvild Flugstad Østberg; Maiken Caspersen Falla | Norway |
| silver medal | Ida Ingemarsdotter; Stina Nilsson | Sweden |
| bronze medal | Justyna Kowalczyk; Sylwia Jaśkowiec | Poland |

The Women's team sprint event of the FIS Nordic World Ski Championships 2015 was held on 22 February 2015.

== Results ==
=== Semifinals ===
Semifinal A

| Rank | Heat | Bib | Country | Athletes | Time | Note |
|---|---|---|---|---|---|---|
| 1 | A | 1 | Norway | Ingvild Flugstad Østberg; Maiken Caspersen Falla | 14:49.26 | Q |
| 2 | A | 3 | Poland | Justyna Kowalczyk; Sylwia Jaśkowiec | 14:49.41 | Q |
| 3 | A | 2 | Sweden | Ida Ingemarsdotter; Stina Nilsson | 14:49.58 | q |
| 4 | A | 5 | France | Coraline Hugue; Célia Aymonier | 14:57.40 | q |
| 5 | A | 4 | Switzerland | Seraina Boner; Laurien van der Graaff | 15:01.87 | q |
| 6 | A | 6 | Kazakhstan | Anastassiya Slonova; Elena Kolomina | 15:44.16 | out |
| 7 | A | 7 | Ukraine | Maryna Antysbor; Kateryna Serdyuk | 16:05.91 | out |
| 8 | A | 9 | United Kingdom | Rosamund Musgrave; Sarah Hale | 16:42.91 | out |
| 9 | A | 8 | Australia | Jessica Yeaton; Casey Wright | 16:46.05 | out |

Semifinal B

| Rank | Heat | Bib | Country | Athletes | Time | Note |
|---|---|---|---|---|---|---|
| 1 | B | 11 | Germany | Nicole Fessel; Denise Herrmann | 14:56.64 | Q |
| 2 | B | 13 | United States | Sophie Caldwell; Jessie Diggins | 15:04.02 | Q |
| 3 | B | 14 | Finland | Riikka Sarasoja-Lilja; Anne Kyllönen | 15:07.90 | q |
| 4 | B | 12 | Russia | Anastasia Dotsenko; Natalya Matveyeva | 15:08.47 | q |
| 5 | B | 10 | Slovenia | Katja Višnar; Nika Razinger | 15:08.48 | q |
| 6 | B | 15 | Italy | Ilaria Debertolis; Gaia Vuerich | 15:08.49 | out |
| 7 | B | 17 | Slovakia | Alena Procházková; Barbora Klementová | 15:09.92 | out |
| 8 | B | 16 | Belarus | Ina Lukonina; Ekaterina Rudakova | 16:14.40 | out |
| 9 | B | 19 | China | Chi Chunxue; Li Xin | 16:44.42 | out |
| 10 | B | 18 | Hungary | Emőke Szőcs; Ildikó Papp | 17:28.69 | out |

=== Final ===
The final was started at 14:30.

| Rank | Bib | Country | Athletes | Time | Deficit |
|---|---|---|---|---|---|
| 1st place, gold medalist(s) | 1 | Norway | Ingvild Flugstad Østberg; Maiken Caspersen Falla | 14:29.57 | |
| 2nd place, silver medalist(s) | 2 | Sweden | Ida Ingemarsdotter; Stina Nilsson | 14:37.74 | +8.17 |
| 3rd place, bronze medalist(s) | 3 | Poland | Justyna Kowalczyk; Sylwia Jaśkowiec | 14:38.05 | +8.48 |
| 4 | 11 | Germany | Nicole Fessel; Denise Herrmann | 14:41.14 | +11.57 |
| 5 | 12 | Russia | Anastasia Dotsenko; Natalya Matveyeva | 14:58.76 | +29.19 |
| 6 | 5 | France | Coraline Hugue; Célia Aymonier | 14:59.83 | +30.26 |
| 7 | 4 | Switzerland | Seraina Boner; Laurien van der Graaff | 15:03.55 | +33.38 |
| 8 | 13 | United States | Sophie Caldwell; Jessie Diggins | 15:03.63 | +34.06 |
| 9 | 10 | Slovenia | Katja Višnar; Nika Razinger | 15:11.96 | +42.39 |
| 10 | 14 | Finland | Riikka Sarasoja-Lilja; Anne Kyllönen | 15:12.47 | +42.90 |
