= Makeleta Stephan =

Cross-country skier (born 1978)

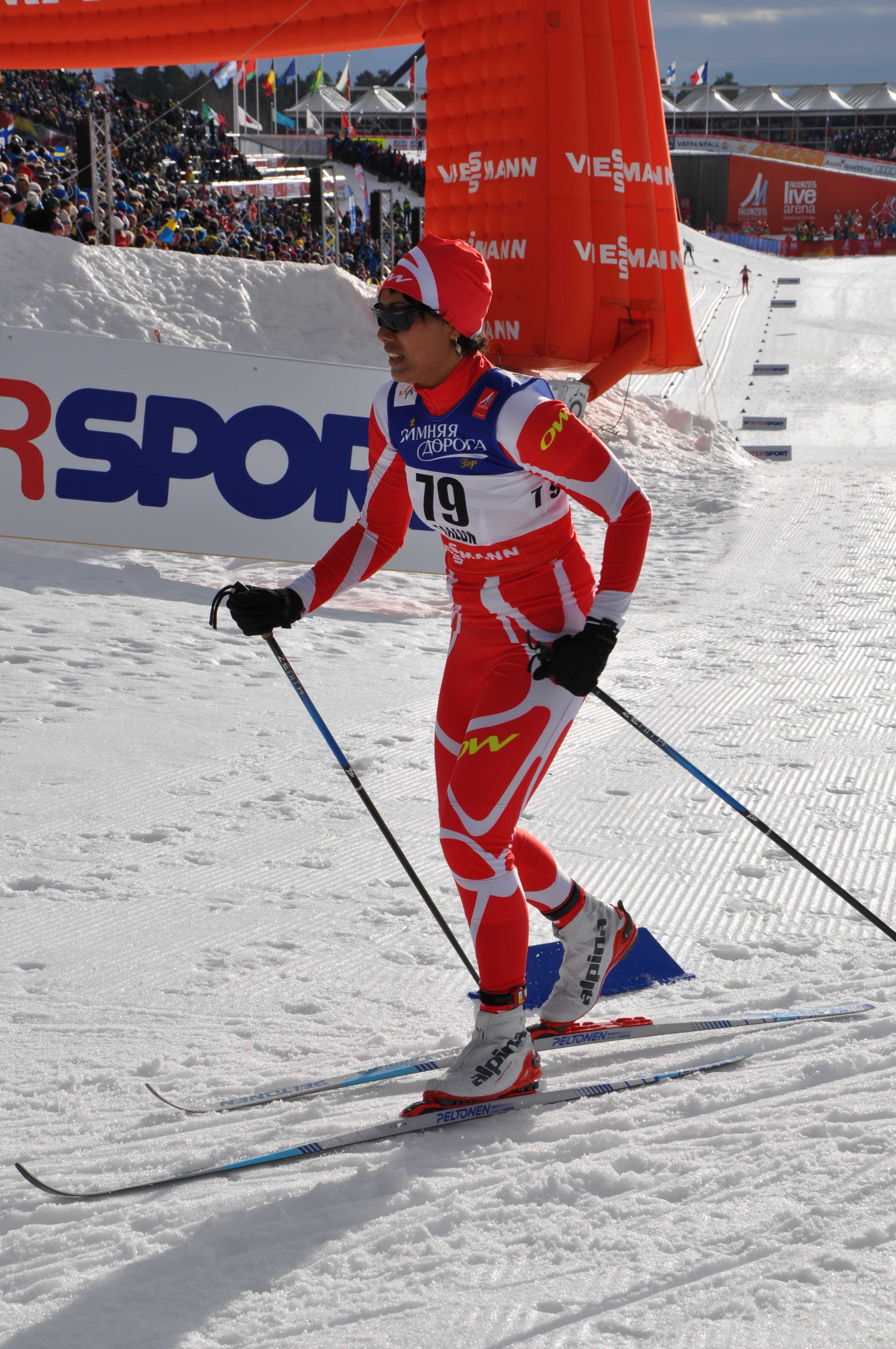

Personal information
- Born: 23 May 1978 (age 47) Haʻateiho, Tongatapu, Tonga

Sport
- Sport: Skiing
- Club: Royal Tonga Ski Federation, Tonga

World Cup career
- Seasons: 2015 World Championships
- Updated on 23 FEBRUARY 2015

Makeleta Stephan (born 23 May 1978 as Makeleta Piukala) is the first Tongan cross-country skier to compete in the FIS Nordic World Ski Championships.

Stephan was born in Haʻateiho, Tongatapu, Tonga, but moved to the outskirts of Pfullendorf, a small town north of Lake Constance in Baden-Württemberg, Germany, when she was fourteen. She is part of the most recent development programme for winter sports athletes from Tonga.

Stephan's entered international competition a year after another German-based Tongan, luge slider Bruno Banani, made the Tongan debut at the 2014 Winter Olympics in Sochi. Tonga set up the Royal Tonga Ski Federation in 2014, with the aim of sending teams to the 2016 Winter Youth Olympics in Lillehammer, Norway, and the 2018 Winter Games in Pyeongchang, South Korea.

Stephan's first representation of Tonga at the FIS Nordic World Ski Championships 2015 in Falun, Sweden, ended with her completing the qualifying round in the cross-country sprint in last place.
