= Cross-country skiing at the 2018 Winter Olympics – Women's team sprint =

Women's team sprint at the XXIII Olympic Winter Games
- Cross-country skiing
- Venue: Alpensia Cross-Country Skiing Centre
- Dates: 21 February 2018
- Competitors: 42 from 21 nations
- Winning time: 15:56.47

Medalists
1st place, gold medalist(s)		Kikkan Randall; Jessie Diggins	United States
2nd place, silver medalist(s)		Charlotte Kalla; Stina Nilsson	Sweden
3rd place, bronze medalist(s)		Marit Bjørgen; Maiken Caspersen Falla	Norway

The women's team sprint freestyle cross-country skiing competition at the 2018 Winter Olympics was held on 21 February 2018 at 19:00 KST at the Alpensia Cross-Country Skiing Centre in Pyeongchang, South Korea. The event consisted of six by 1.25km sprints alternating between two teammates. Kikkan Randall and Jessie Diggins won the event, making this the first ever Olympic medal for the United States in women's cross-country skiing. It was also the first ever Olympic gold medal for the United States in cross-country skiing. Charlotte Kalla and Stina Nilsson came second, and the defending champion Marit Bjørgen, skiing in pair with Maiken Caspersen Falla, won the bronze medal.

== Qualification ==
A total of up to 310 cross-country skiers qualified across all eleven events. Athletes qualified for this event by having met the A qualification standard, which meant having 100 or less FIS Points The Points list takes into average the best results of athletes per discipline during the qualification period (1 July 2016 to 21 January 2018). Countries received additional quotas by having athletes ranked in the top 30 of the FIS Olympics Points list (two per gender maximum, overall across all events). Countries also received an additional quota (one per gender maximum) if an athlete was ranked in the top 300 of the FIS Olympics Points list. After the distribution of B standard quotas, the remaining quotas were distributed using the Olympic FIS Points list, with each athlete only counting once for qualification purposes. A country could only enter a maximum of one team for the sprint consisting of two athletes.

== Results ==
Q — qualified for next round
LL — lucky loser
PF — photo finish

=== Semifinals ===
Rank	Heat	Bib	Country	Athletes	Time	Note
1	1	1	Norway	Marit Bjørgen; Maiken Caspersen Falla	16:33.28	Q
2	1	3	Switzerland	Nadine Fähndrich; Laurien van der Graaff	16:39.83	Q
3	1	5	Slovenia	Alenka Čebašek; Anamarija Lampič	16:39.92	LL
4	1	2	Germany	Nicole Fessel; Sandra Ringwald	16:51.67	LL
5	1	6	Czech Republic	Kateřina Beroušková; Petra Nováková	16:53.06	
6	1	9	Australia	Jessica Yeaton; Barbara Jezeršek	17:20.38	
7	1	4	Austria	Lisa Unterweger; Teresa Stadlober	17:25.98	
8	1	8	Belarus	Yulia Tikhonova; Polina Seronosova	17:33.63	
9	1	11	Slovakia	Alena Procházková; Barbora Klementová	17:52.14	
10	1	7	Kazakhstan	Anna Shevchenko; Valeriya Tyuleneva	17:57.04	
11	1	10	South Korea	Lee Chae-won; Ju Hye-ri	19:19.17	
1	2	14	United States	Kikkan Randall; Jessie Diggins	16:22.56	Q
2	2	12	Sweden	Charlotte Kalla; Stina Nilsson	16:23.28	Q
3	2	15	Olympic Athletes from Russia	Natalya Nepryayeva; Yuliya Belorukova	16:24.63	LL
4	2	13	Finland	Mari Laukkanen; Krista Pärmäkoski	16:31.54	LL
5	2	18	Poland	Justyna Kowalczyk; Sylwia Jaśkowiec	16:35.19	LL
6	2	17	France	Aurore Jéan; Coraline Thomas Hugue	16:40.40	LL
7	2	21	Canada	Emily Nishikawa; Dahria Beatty	17:01.54	
8	2	16	Italy	Elisa Brocard; Gaia Vuerich	17:13.04	
9	2	20	China	Chi Chunxue; Li Xin	17:35.94	
10	2	19	Ukraine	Tetyana Antypenko; Maryna Antsybor	17:44.04	

=== Final ===
The final started at 19:00.

Rank	Bib	Country	Athletes	Time	Deficit
1st place, gold medalist(s)	14	United States	Kikkan Randall; Jessie Diggins	15:56.47	—
2nd place, silver medalist(s)	12	Sweden	Charlotte Kalla; Stina Nilsson	15:56.66	+0.19
3rd place, bronze medalist(s)	1	Norway	Marit Bjørgen; Maiken Caspersen Falla	15:59.44	+2.97
4	3	Switzerland	Nadine Fähndrich; Laurien van der Graaff	16:17.79	+21.32
5	13	Finland	Mari Laukkanen; Krista Pärmäkoski	16:19.18	+22.71
6	5	Slovenia	Alenka Čebašek; Anamarija Lampič	16:28.24	+31.77
7	18	Poland	Justyna Kowalczyk; Sylwia Jaśkowiec	16:32.48	+36.01
8	17	France	Aurore Jéan; Coraline Thomas Hugue	16:32.49	+36.02
9	15	Olympic Athletes from Russia	Natalya Nepryayeva; Yuliya Belorukova	16:41.76	+45.29
10	2	Germany	Nicole Fessel; Sandra Ringwald	17:06.57	+1:10.10

== Broadcast call ==
The final is also known for its NBC broadcast call of "Here comes Diggins!" from Chad Salmela alongside Steve Schlanger:

Schlanger: Jessie Diggins with two fifth-place finishes, one sixth, so close for the U.S. on so many occasions, now moving up on the outside into second place!
Salmela: They're all completely gassed! They've given it everything on the Klæbo-bakken! Stina Nilsson leading Jessie Diggins into the final turn – can Diggins answer?!
Schlanger: As the roars rattle around the cross-country stadium in Pyeongchang, Sweden, the U.S., and Norway coming to the line!
Salmela: Here comes Diggins! Here comes Diggins!
Schlanger: On the outside! Diggins making the play around Sweden!
Salmela: Yes! Yes! Yes! Yes! Gold!
Schlanger: Jessie Diggins to the line! And it is Jessie Diggins delivering a landmark moment that will be etched in U.S. Olympic history! The first ever cross-country gold medal for the U.S.!
Salmela: It's a gold medal for the United States! It's not just a medal, it's the gold!
