= Farzaneh Rezasoltani =

Personal information
- Born: September 13, 1985 (age 40)

Sport
- Country: Iran
- Sport: Cross-country skiing

Farzaneh Rezasoltani (Persian: فرزانه رضاسلطانی, born September 13, 1985) is a cross-country skier competing for Iran. She competed for Iran at the 2014 Winter Olympics in the 10 kilometre classical race. She finished in 70th place, with a time of 42:31.3.
