= Cross-country skiing at the 2014 Winter Olympics – Women's team sprint =

Women's team sprint at the XXII Olympic Winter Games
- Venue: Laura Biathlon & Ski Complex
- Dates: 19 February 2014
- Competitors: 34 from 17 nations
- Winning time: 16:04.05

Medalists
1st place, gold medalist(s)		Marit Bjørgen; Ingvild Flugstad Østberg	Norway
2nd place, silver medalist(s)		Aino-Kaisa Saarinen; Kerttu Niskanen	Finland
3rd place, bronze medalist(s)		Ida Ingemarsdotter; Stina Nilsson	Sweden

The women's team sprint cross-country skiing competition in the classical technique at the 2014 Sochi Olympics took place on 19 February at Laura Biathlon & Ski Complex.

== Results ==
The races were started at 14:05.

In November 2017, Yuliya Ivanova was disqualified from the event meaning that the whole Russian team was also disqualified.

=== Semifinals ===
Rank	Heat	Bib	Country	Athletes	Time	Note
1	1	1	Norway	Ingvild Flugstad Østberg; Marit Bjørgen	16:43.45	Q
2	1	3	Sweden	Ida Ingemarsdotter; Stina Nilsson	16:48.76	Q
3	1	2	United States	Sophie Caldwell; Kikkan Randall	16:51.36	LL
4	1	7	Switzerland	Bettina Gruber; Seraina Boner	17:02.14	LL
5	1	6	Canada	Perianne Jones; Daria Gaiazova	17:09.13	
6	1	5	France	Aurore Jéan; Célia Aymonier	17:10.07	
7	1	4	Italy	Ilaria Debertolis; Gaia Vuerich	17:35.98	
8	1	8	China	Man Dandan; Li Hongxue	17:40.90	
9	1	9	Kazakhstan	Yelena Kolomina; Anastassiya Slonova	17:49.66	
1	2	11	Finland	Aino-Kaisa Saarinen; Kerttu Niskanen	16:42.15	Q
2	2	13	Poland	Sylwia Jaśkowiec; Justyna Kowalczyk	16:49.43	Q
DSQ	2	14	Russia	Anastasia Dotsenko; Yuliya Ivanova	16:49.61	LL
4	2	12	Germany	Stefanie Böhler; Denise Herrmann	16:58.98	LL
5	2	15	Austria	Kateřina Smutná; Teresa Stadlober	16:59.50	LL
6	2	10	Slovenia	Alenka Čebašek; Katja Višnar	17:00.32	LL
7	2	16	Slovakia	Alena Procházková; Daniela Kotschová	18:51.94	
	2	17	Ukraine	Maryna Lisohor; Kateryna Serdyuk	DNS	

On 19 February Ukrainian athletes asked for and were refused permission by the International Olympic Committee (IOC) to wear black arm bands to honor those killed in the violent clashes in Kyiv the previous day. According to press reports Lisohor and Serdyuk had refused to start because they had been denied to wear black arm bands. The National Olympic Committee of Ukraine claimed Serdyuk was injured.

=== Final ===
Rank	Bib	Country	Athletes	Time	Deficit
1st place, gold medalist(s)	1	Norway	Ingvild Flugstad Østberg; Marit Bjørgen	16:04.05	—
2nd place, silver medalist(s)	11	Finland	Aino-Kaisa Saarinen; Kerttu Niskanen	16:13.14	+09.09
3rd place, bronze medalist(s)	3	Sweden	Ida Ingemarsdotter; Stina Nilsson	16:23.82	+19.77
4	12	Germany	Stefanie Böhler; Denise Herrmann	16:24.97	+20.94
5	13	Poland	Sylwia Jaśkowiec; Justyna Kowalczyk	16:35.54	+31.49
DSQ	14	Russia	Anastasia Dotsenko; Yuliya Ivanova	16:44.91	+40.86
6	7	Switzerland	Bettina Gruber; Seraina Boner	16:45.47	+41.42
7	2	United States	Sophie Caldwell; Kikkan Randall	16:48.08	+44.03
8	15	Austria	Kateřina Smutná; Teresa Stadlober	16:49.16	+45.11
9	10	Slovenia	Alenka Čebašek; Katja Višnar	16:57.98	+53.93

== Medal ceremony ==
At the medal ceremony in Sochi on 20 February, the day after the race, all medals were awarded by IOC member Frederik, Crown Prince of Denmark and flowers to all medalists were awarded by Mats Årjes, FIS council member.
