= Olga Reshetkova =

Kyrgyzstani cross-country skier (born 1982)

Personal information
- Born: January 29, 1982 (age 43) Bishkek, Kyrgyzstan

Sport
- Country: Kyrgyzstan
- Sport: Skiing

Olga Reshetkova (born January 29, 1982) is a Kyrgyzstani cross-country skier who has competed since 2002. She finished 54th in the individual sprint event at the 2010 Winter Olympics in Vancouver.

Reshetkova's best finish at the FIS Nordic World Ski Championships was 15th in the team sprint event at Liberec in 2009 was 43rd in a 15 km event at Val di Fiemme six years earlier.

Her best overall finish was 11th in a 5 km race in the Czech Republic in 2009.

== Cross-country skiing results ==
All results are sourced from the International Ski Federation (FIS).

=== Olympic Games ===
Year	Age	10 km individual	15 km skiathlon	30 km mass start	Sprint	4 × 5 km relay	Team sprint
2010	28	—	—	—	54	—	—

=== World Championships ===
Year	Age	10 km	15 km	Pursuit	30 km	Sprint	4 × 5 km relay	Team sprint
2003	21	55	43	60	—	—	—	—N/a
2007	25	64	—N/a	DNF	44	—	—	—
2009	27	—	—N/a	62	55	70	—	15
2011	29	—	—N/a	—	—	86	—	—
