= Maria Rydqvist =

Swedish cross-country skier (born 1983)

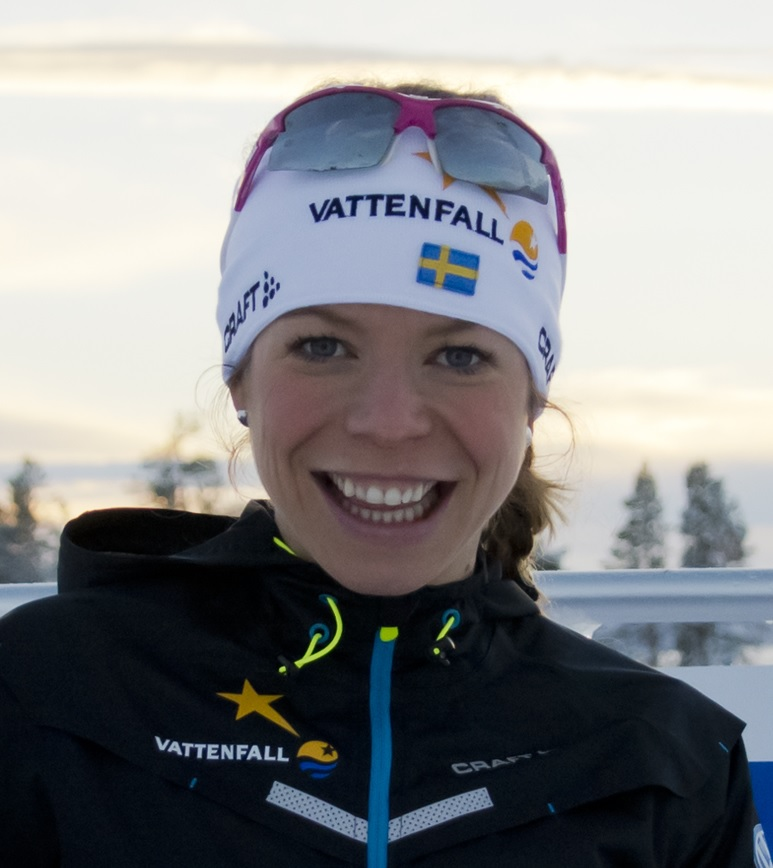
- Maria Rydqvist in November 2015

Personal information
- Full name: Anna Maria Sofia Rydqvist
- Nationality: Sweden
- Born: 22 March 1983 Smålandsstenar, Sweden

Sport
- Sport: Skiing
- Club: Älvdalens IF

World Cup career
- Seasons: 13 – (2003–2009, 2011–2012, 2014–2017)
- Indiv. starts: 138
- Indiv. podiums: 0
- Team starts: 17
- Team podiums: 4
- Team wins: 0
- Overall titles: 0 – (24th in 2016)
- Discipline titles: 0
Medal record
Women's cross-country skiing
Representing Sweden
World Championships
Silver medal – second place	2015 Falun	4 × 5 km relay
U23 World Championships
Bronze medal – third place	&m2005 Oberstdorf	15 km skiathlon
Junior World Championships
Silver medal – second place	2003 Sollefteå	15 km freestyle
Bronze medal – third place	2001 Karpacz	4 × 5 km relay
Bronze medal – third place	2003 Sollefteå	4 × 5 km relay

Maria Rydqvist (born 22 March 1983) is a Swedish cross-country skier. Her best World Cup finish is third in a 4 × 5 km relay event in Sweden in 2007.

Rydqvist's best individual finish at the FIS Nordic World Ski Championships was fourth in the 10 km freestyle in Falun in 2015.

== Cross-country skiing results ==
All results are sourced from the International Ski Federation (FIS).

=== World Championships ===
- 1 medal – (1 silver)

Year	Age	10 km individual	15 km skiathlon	30 km mass start	Sprint	4 × 5 km relay	Team sprint
2005	21	35	21	—	—	8	—
2009	25	—	DNS	—	—	—	—
2011	27	—	6	—	—	—	—
2015	31	4	9	—	—	Silver	—

=== World Cup ===
==== Season standings ====
Season	Age	Discipline standings			Ski Tour standings			
Season	Age	Overall	Distance	Sprint	Nordic Opening	Tour de Ski	World Cup Final	Ski Tour Canada
2003	20	NC	—N/a	NC	—N/a	—N/a	—N/a	—N/a
2004	21	NC	NC	NC	—N/a	—N/a	—N/a	—N/a
2005	22	NC	NC	NC	—N/a	—N/a	—N/a	—N/a
2006	23	73	56	NC	—N/a	—N/a	—N/a	—N/a
2007	24	78	54	NC	—N/a	—	—N/a	—N/a
2008	25	64	46	55	—N/a	—	—	—N/a
2009	26	104	77	NC	—N/a	DNF	—	—N/a
2011	28	31	22	66	24	15	22	—N/a
2012	29	37	22	NC	DNF	27	24	—N/a
2014	31	50	38	NC	—	18	—	—N/a
2015	32	27	22	NC	57	12	—N/a	—N/a
2016	33	24	21	NC	23	13	—N/a	DNF
2017	34	88	65	NC	—	DNF	—	—N/a

==== Team podiums ====
- 4 podiums – (4 RL)

No.	Season	Date	Location	Race	Level	Place	Teammates
1	2006–07	25 March 2007	Falun, Sweden	4 × 5 km Relay C/F	World Cup	3rd	Dahlberg / Norgren / Kalla
2	2010–11	21 November 2010	Gällivare, Sweden	4 × 5 km Relay C/F	World Cup	2nd	Norgren / Haag / Kalla
3	2010–11	19 December 2010	La Clusaz, France	4 × 5 km Relay C/F	World Cup	3rd	Lindborg / Haag / Kalla
4	2016–17	18 December 2016	La Clusaz, France	4 × 5 km Relay C/F	World Cup	3rd	Wikén / Nilsson / Dyvik
