= Britta Johansson Norgren =

Swedish cross-country skier

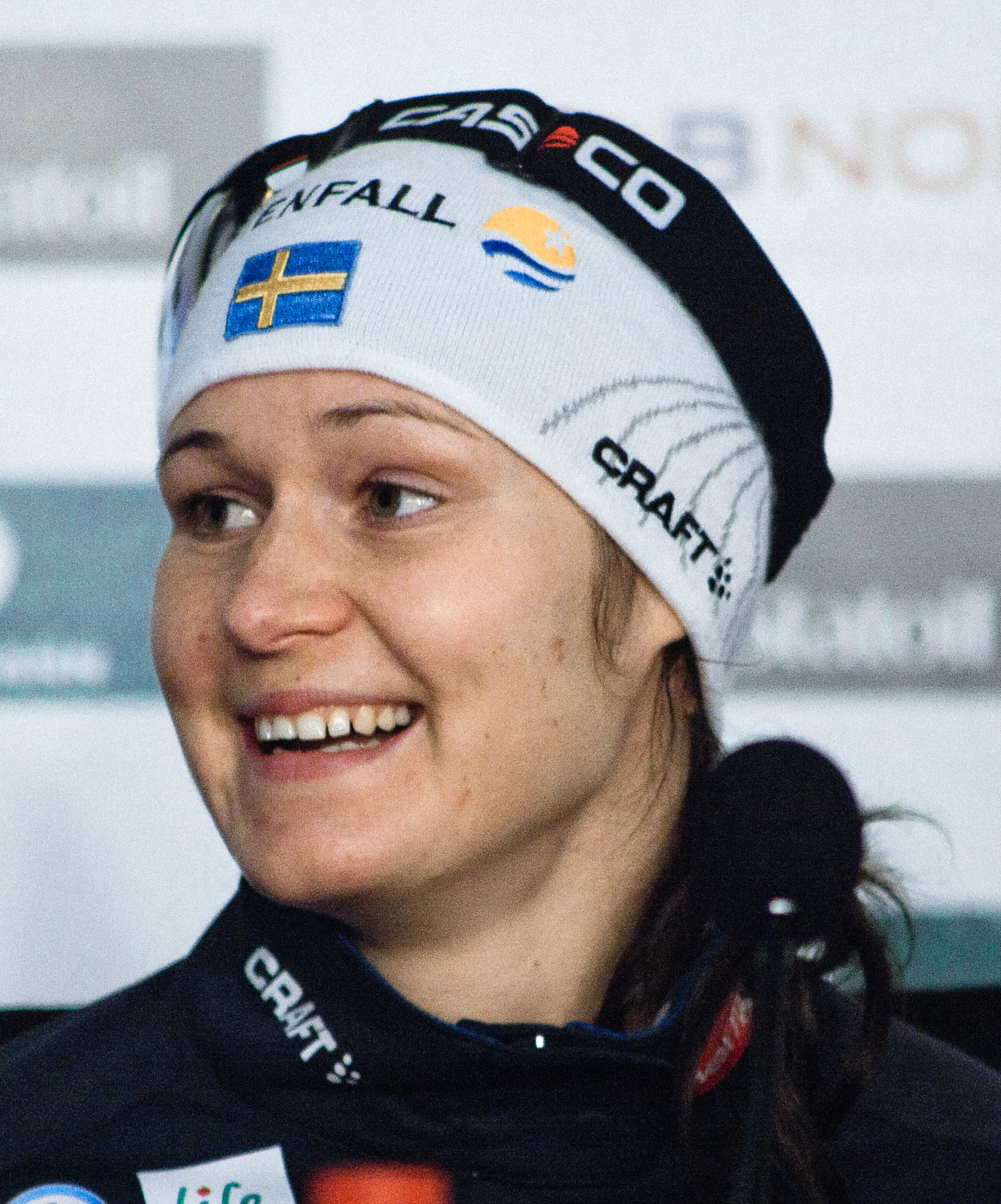
- Britta Johansson Norgren in March 2011

Personal information
- Full name: Britta Johanna Helena Johansson Norgren
- Nationality: Sweden
- Born: 30 March 1983 (age 43) Uppsala, Sweden

Sport
- Sport: Skiing
- Club: Sollefteå Skidor IF

World Cup career
- Seasons: 11 – (2003–2011, 2013–2014)
- Indiv. starts: 113
- Indiv. podiums: 0
- Team starts: 16
- Team podiums: 8
- Team wins: 2
- Overall titles: 0 – (30th in 2009)
- Discipline titles: 0
Medal record
Women's cross-country skiing
Representing Sweden
World Championships
Silver medal – second place	2011 Oslo	4 × 5 km relay
Bronze medal – third place	2009 Liberec	4 × 5 km relay

Britta Johanna Helena Johansson Norgren (née Norgren; born 30 March 1983) is a Swedish former cross-country skier who has competed between 2002 and 2022, first in World Cup events, then in marathon events. She won a bronze medal in the 4 × 5 km at the FIS Nordic World Ski Championships 2009 in Liberec. Her best individual finish at the FIS Nordic World Ski Championships is 26th in the individual sprint at Sapporo in 2007.

== Career ==
Britta Norgren was born and raised in Bälinge, Uppsala Municipality and moved to Sollefteå to attend the skiing riksidrottsgymnasium.

Johansson Norgren's best individual finish at the Winter Olympics was 11th in the 10 km event at Turin in 2006.

She has a total of eight individual victories at various levels up to 30 km since 2002. Johansson Norgren's best individual World Cup finish was eighth in the sprint event in Germany in 2006.

After the 2013–14 season, Johansson Norgren switched to marathon cross-county skiing. On 31 January 2016 she won the women's edition of the Marcialonga ski marathon race in Italy.

She won the Tjejvasan in 2016, On 25 February 2017, she once again won Tjejvasan. She also won Tjejvasan in 2019. and the ski marathon Vasaloppet in 2017 and 2019. In February 2020, she won Tjejvasan once again. On 26 February 2022, she again won the same race.

On 8 April 2022, she announced her retirement from cross-country skiing.

== Personal life ==
Britta Norgren is married to Jonas Johansson, a former national coach for the Sweden biathlon team.

== Cross-country skiing results ==
All results are sourced from the International Ski Federation (FIS).

=== Olympic Games ===
Year	Age	10 km individual	15 km skiathlon	30 km mass start	Sprint	4 × 5 km relay	Team sprint
2006	22	11	15	28	—	4	—
2010	26	29	52	—	13	—	—
2014	30	—	38	—	14	—	—

=== World Championships ===
- 2 medals – (1 silver, 1 bronze)

Year	Age	10 km individual	15 km skiathlon	30 km mass start	Sprint	4 × 5 km relay	Team sprint
2007	23	—	27	32	26	4	4
2009	25	—	—	DNF	38	Bronze	—
2011	27	—	—	31	—	Silver	—

=== World Cup ===
==== Season standings ====
Season	Age	Discipline standings			Ski Tour standings		
Season	Age	Overall	Distance	Sprint	Nordic Opening	Tour de Ski	World Cup Final
2003	20	102	—N/a	67	—N/a	—N/a	—N/a
2004	21	NC	NC	NC	—N/a	—N/a	—N/a
2005	22	NC	NC	—	—N/a	—N/a	—N/a
2006	23	35	36	23	—N/a	—N/a	—N/a
2007	24	38	80	22	—N/a	41	—N/a
2008	25	96	NC	73	—N/a	—	—
2009	26	30	35	16	—N/a	—	DNF
2010	27	50	44	42	—N/a	26	36
2011	28	32	31	24	29	17	30
2013	30	61	NC	32	—	—	—
2014	31	36	44	26	11	—	—

==== Team podiums ====
- 2 victories – (1 RL, 1 TS)
- 8 podiums – (5 RL, 3 TS)

No.	Season	Date	Location	Race	Level	Place	Teammate(s)
1	2005–06	18 March 2006	Sapporo, Japan	6 × 0.8 km Team Sprint F	World Cup	3rd	Strömstedt
2	2006–07	29 October 2006	Düsseldorf, Germany	6 × 0.8 km Team Sprint F	World Cup	2nd	Andersson
3	2006–07	17 December 2006	La Clusaz, France	4 × 5 km Relay C/F	World Cup	2nd	Andersson / Lindborg / Kalla
4	2006–07	4 February 2007	Davos, Switzerland	4 × 5 km Relay C/F	World Cup	1st	Andersson / Strömstedt / Kalla
5	2006–07	25 March 2007	Falun, Sweden	4 × 5 km Relay C/F	World Cup	3rd	Dahlberg / Rydqvist / Kalla
6	2007–08	28 October 2007	Düsseldorf, Germany	6 × 0.8 km Team Sprint F	World Cup	1st	Kalla
7	2008–09	23 November 2008	Gällivare, Sweden	4 × 5 km Relay C/F	World Cup	3rd	Hansson / Haag / Kalla
8	2010–11	21 November 2010	Gällivare, Sweden	4 × 5 km Relay C/F	World Cup	2nd	Haag / Rydqvist / Kalla
