= Sara Lindborg =

Swedish cross-country skier

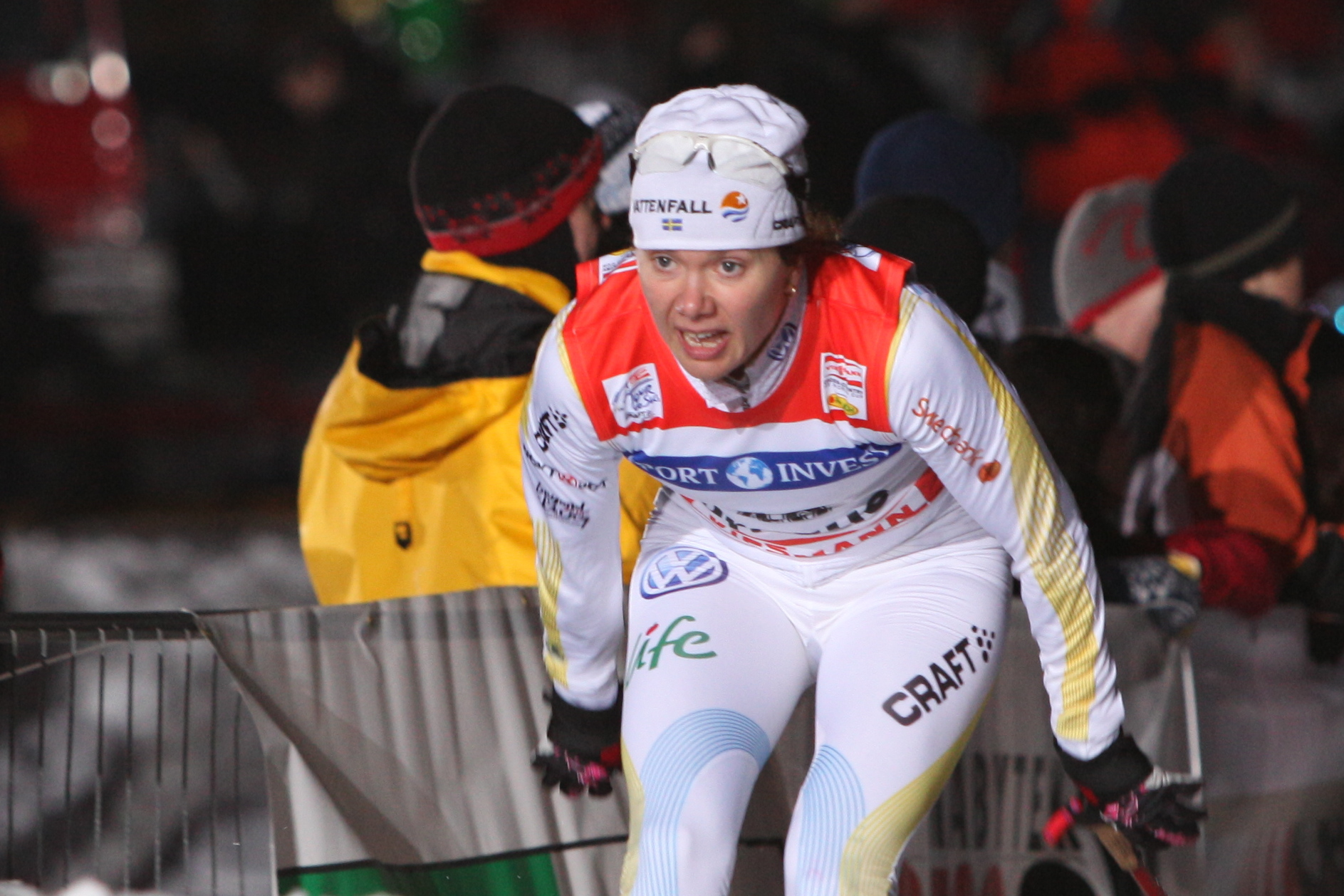
- Sara Lindborg at Ski Sprint Prague 2010

Personal information
- Nationality: Sweden
- Born: 30 November 1983 (age 42) Falun, Sweden

Sport
- Sport: Skiing
- Club: Östersunds SK

World Cup career
- Seasons: 12 – (2004–2015)
- Indiv. starts: 104
- Indiv. podiums: 0
- Team starts: 11
- Team podiums: 4
- Team wins: 1
- Overall titles: 0 – (26th in 2014)
- Discipline titles: 0

Sara Lindborg (born 30 November 1983) is a Swedish cross-country skier who has competed since 2002. Her best World Cup finish was second twice, both in the 4 × 5 km relay in France (2006, 2008). Lindborg's best individual finish was 12th in a 10 km event in Estonia in 2007.

At the FIS Nordic World Ski Championships 2007 in Sapporo, she finished 16th in the 30 km, 24th in the 10 km, and 31st in the 7.5 km + 7.5 km double pursuit events.

== Cross-country skiing results ==
All results are sourced from the International Ski Federation (FIS).

=== Olympic Games ===
Year	Age	10 km individual	15 km skiathlon	30 km mass start	Sprint	4 × 5 km relay	Team sprint
2014	30	15	19	37	—	—	—

=== World Championships ===
Year	Age	10 km individual	15 km skiathlon	30 km mass start	Sprint	4 × 5 km relay	Team sprint
2007	23	24	31	16	—	—	—
2011	27	25	30	30	—	—	—

=== World Cup ===
==== Season standings ====
Season	Age	Discipline standings			Ski Tour standings		
Season	Age	Overall	Distance	Sprint	Nordic Opening	Tour de Ski	World Cup Final
2004	21	NC	NC	—	—N/a	—N/a	—N/a
2005	22	NC	NC	—	—N/a	—N/a	—N/a
2006	23	NC	NC	—	—N/a	—N/a	—N/a
2007	24	65	41	NC	—N/a	33	—N/a
2008	25	NC	NC	—	—N/a	—	—
2009	26	64	50	NC	—N/a	24	—
2010	27	88	62	NC	—N/a	DNF	—
2011	28	71	51	NC	36	DNF	27
2012	29	78	57	NC	31	—	—
2013	30	79	59	NC	28	39	—
2014	31	26	24	NC	—	11	15
2015	32	69	47	NC	28	DNF	—N/a

==== Team podiums ====
- 1 victory – (1 RL)
- 4 podiums – (4 RL)

No.	Season	Date	Location	Race	Level	Place	Teammates
1	2006–07	17 December 2006	La Clusaz, France	4 × 5 km Relay C/F	World Cup	2nd	Andersson / Kalla / Norgren
2	2008–09	7 December 2008	La Clusaz, France	4 × 5 km Relay C/F	World Cup	2nd	Andersson / Haag / Kalla
3	2009–10	22 November 2009	Beitostølen, Norway	4 × 5 km Relay C/F	World Cup	1st	Olsson / Haag / Kalla
4	2010–11	12 December 2010	La Clusaz, France	4 × 5 km Relay C/F	World Cup	3rd	Haag / Rydqvist / Kalla
