= Charlotte Kalla =

Swedish cross-country skier

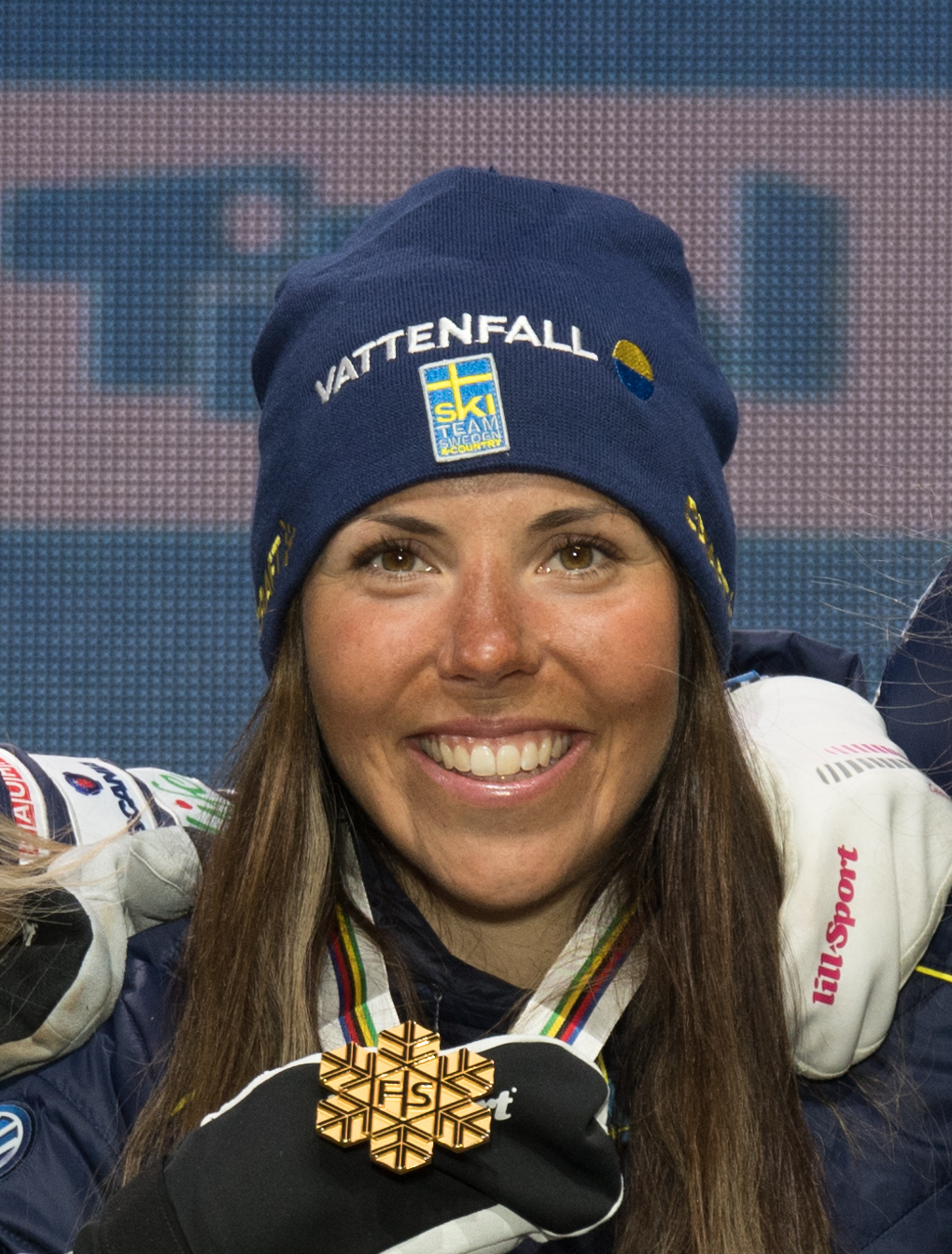
- Kalla in February 2019

Personal information
- Full name: Marina Charlotte Kalla
- Nationality: Sweden
- Born: 22 July 1987 (age 39) Pajala, Sweden
- Height: 1.62 m (5 ft 4 in)

Sport
- Sport: Skiing
- Club: Piteå Elit

World Cup career
- Seasons: 17 – (2006–2022)
- Indiv. starts: 266
- Indiv. podiums: 59
- Indiv. wins: 12
- Team starts: 30
- Team podiums: 15
- Team wins: 3
- Overall titles: 0 – (4th in 2008, 2012)
- Discipline titles: 0
Medal record
Women's cross-country skiing
Representing Sweden
International nordic ski competitions
Event	1st	2nd	3rd
Olympic Games	3	6	0
World Championships	3	6	4
Total	6	12	4
Olympic Games
Gold medal – first place	2010 Vancouver	10 km freestyle
Gold medal – first place	2014 Sochi	4 × 5 km relay
Gold medal – first place	2018 Pyeongchang	15 km skiathlon
Silver medal – second place	2010 Vancouver	Team sprint
Silver medal – second place	2014 Sochi	15 km skiathlon
Silver medal – second place	2014 Sochi	10 km classical
Silver medal – second place	2018 Pyeongchang	10 km freestyle
Silver medal – second place	2018 Pyeongchang	4 × 5 km relay
Silver medal – second place	2018 Pyeongchang	Team sprint
World Championships
Gold medal – first place	2011 Oslo	Team sprint
Gold medal – first place	2015 Falun	10 km freestyle
Gold medal – first place	2019 Seefeld	4 × 5 km relay
Silver medal – second place	2011 Oslo	4 × 5 km relay
Silver medal – second place	2013 Val di Fiemme	Team sprint
Silver medal – second place	2013 Val di Fiemme	4 × 5 km relay
Silver medal – second place	2015 Falun	4 × 5 km relay
Silver medal – second place	2017 Lahti	10 km classical
Silver medal – second place	2017 Lahti	4 × 5 km relay
Bronze medal – third place	2009 Liberec	4 × 5 km relay
Bronze medal – third place	2015 Falun	15 km skiathlon
Bronze medal – third place	2015 Falun	30 km classical
Bronze medal – third place	2017 Lahti	15 km skiathlon
Junior World Championships
Gold medal – first place	2006 Kranj	10 km pursuit
Gold medal – first place	2007 Tarvisio	10 km pursuit
Gold medal – first place	2007 Tarvisio	5 km freestyle
Silver medal – second place	2006 Kranj	4 × 3.33 km relay
Silver medal – second place	2007 Tarvisio	Individual sprint
Silver medal – second place	2007 Tarvisio	4 × 3.33 km relay
Bronze medal – third place	2006 Kranj	5 km classical

Marina Charlotte Kalla (Swedish pronunciation: [ɧaˈɭɔtː ˈkâlːa]; born 22 July 1987) is a Swedish Tornedalian retired cross-country skier. A four-time Olympian, Kalla won three golds and nine medals overall at the Olympics between 2004 and 2022. She holds the joint record as Sweden's most decorated Olympic competitor and is the all-time leader among Swedish female athletes. She is also a 13-time medalist at the World Championships, including a gold medal at the FIS Nordic World Ski Championships 2015 10 km freestyle event in Falun. This made Kalla the first Swedish female cross-country skier to win individual golds in both the Olympics and World Championships. In 2008, Kalla won the Jerring Award for her Tour de Ski win.

She retired from competitive skiing after the Swedish Championships in March 2022.

== Winter Olympics ==
=== 2010 Winter Olympics ===
Kalla won the gold medal in the women's 10 km individual for Sweden at the 2010 Winter Olympics in Vancouver, British Columbia, Canada, with a time of 24:58.4. She also won a silver in the team sprint event with Anna Haag at those same games.

=== 2014 Winter Olympics ===
Kalla won a silver medal in the skiathlon event on 8 February in Sochi, and another silver in the classical race on 13 February. In the 4 × 5 km women's relay race, held on 15 February, she ran in the final leg and started third with a 25.7 sec lag behind the first place and a 19.9 lag behind the second place, but totally reduced the gap, and overtook her competitors in the final straight, giving Sweden the gold medal.

=== 2018 Winter Olympics ===
Kalla took the first gold medal awarded at the 2018 Games in Pyeongchang when she won the skiathlon, breaking away from the leading group on the last lap of the course to take victory with a lead of 7.8 seconds over second-placed Marit Bjørgen. Her win made her the first Swedish woman to win three Winter Olympic golds, and tied her with canoer Agneta Andersson as the female Swede with most Olympic gold medals overall. It was also Kalla's sixth Olympic medal, equalling Anja Pärson's record for the most Winter Olympic medals among Swedish women. She then went on to win silver in the 10 km freestyle individual start, the 4 × 5 km relay (together with Anna Haag, Ebba Andersson and Stina Nilsson) and the team sprint (with Stina Nilsson).

=== 2022 Winter Olympics ===
Kalla competed in three events at the 2022 Olympics in Beijing, her fourth appearance at the Games. Her highest placing was in the 15-km skiathlon, where she finished 19th as the defending champion. Kalla announced her retirement from international competition later that winter.

== Other competitions ==
On 6 January 2008, Kalla won the second edition of Tour de Ski in her debut in the event.

On 17–18 April 2015, Kalla participated and placed second in Keb Classic, a ski mountaineering event in Kebnekaise, Sweden, with Emelie Forsberg and Josefina Wikberg.

== Personal life ==
Kalla was born in Tärendö in Norrbotten, Sweden. She is the eldest of three daughters.

In 2023, Kalla competed on the Swedish reality TV series Let's Dance, pairing with professional dancer Tobias Karlsson. Kalla became pregnant before the competition started, becoming the first dancer to participate while pregnant. Her daughter was born 15 July 2023. In August 2025, she gave birth to a son.

Kalla is of Tornedalian descent. Her grandfather, Väinö Martikkala, was of Finnish descent, and her maternal grandmother came from Finland.

She published her autobiography in 2023: "Skam den som ger sig" ("shame on the one who gives up"), in Swedish only. Written in the first person, the book summarises her sports career and describes her view.

== Cross-country skiing results ==
All results are sourced from the International Ski Federation (FIS).

=== Olympic Games ===
- 9 medals – (3 gold, 6 silver)

Year	Age	10 km individual	15 km skiathlon	30 km mass start	Sprint	4 × 5 km relay	Team sprint
2010	22	Gold	8	6	—	5	Silver
2014	26	Silver	Silver	34	—	Gold	—
2018	30	Silver	Gold	5	—	Silver	Silver
2022	34	20	19	35	—	—	—

=== World Championships ===
- 13 medals – (3 gold, 6 silver, 4 bronze)

Year	Age	10 km individual	15 km skiathlon	30 km mass start	Sprint	4 × 5 km relay	Team sprint
2007	19	5	7	—	—	4	—
2009	21	—	8	18	6	Bronze	—
2011	23	11	4	4	8	Silver	Gold
2013	25	7	6	11	11	Silver	Silver
2015	27	Gold	Bronze	Bronze	—	Silver	—
2017	29	Silver	Bronze	7	—	Silver	—
2019	31	9	6	5	—	Gold	—
2021	33	6	5	DNF	—	6	—

=== World Cup ===
==== Season standings ====
Season	Age	Discipline standings			Ski Tour standings				
Season	Age	Overall	Distance	Sprint	Nordic Opening	Tour de Ski	Ski Tour 2020	World Cup Final	Ski Tour Canada
2006	18	78	NC	48	—N/a	—N/a	—N/a	—N/a	—N/a
2007	19	37	28	39	—N/a	—	—N/a	—N/a	—N/a
2008	20	4	7	18	—N/a	1st place, gold medalist(s)	—N/a	18	—N/a
2009	21	12	12	17	—N/a	—	—N/a	3rd place, bronze medalist(s)	—N/a
2010	22	8	4	52	—N/a	—	—N/a	3rd place, bronze medalist(s)	—N/a
2011	23	5	6	12	3rd place, bronze medalist(s)	5	—N/a	—N/a	—N/a
2012	24	4	4	15	4	7	—N/a	3rd place, bronze medalist(s)	—N/a
2013	25	8	7	20	—	7	—N/a	3rd place, bronze medalist(s)	—N/a
2014	26	7	4	38	2nd place, silver medalist(s)	—	—N/a	5	—N/a
2015	27	7	4	21	5	—	—N/a	—N/a	—N/a
2016	28	5	4	22	6	4	—N/a	—N/a	12
2017	29	9	5	69	—	11	—N/a	8	—N/a
2018	30	7	6	43	1st place, gold medalist(s)	—	—N/a	7	—N/a
2019	31	10	7	35	4	—	—N/a	10	—N/a
2020	32	14	10	69	14	12	15	—N/a	—N/a
2021	33	53	42	—	—	—	—N/a	—N/a	—N/a
2022	34	31	20	NC	—N/a	16	—N/a	—N/a	—N/a

==== Individual podiums ====
- 12 victories – (7 WC, 5 SWC)
- 59 podiums – (35 WC, 24 SWC)

No.	Season	Date	Location	Race	Level	Place
1	2007–08	24 November 2007	Beitostølen, Norway	10 km Individual F	World Cup	3rd
2	2007–08	29 December 2007	Nové Město, Czech Republic	10 km Pursuit F	Stage World Cup	1st
3	2007–08	1 January 2008	Nové Město, Czech Republic	10 km Pursuit F	Stage World Cup	1st
4	2007–08	4 January 2008	Asiago, Italy	1.2 km Sprint F	Stage World Cup	1st
5	2007–08	5 January 2008	Val di Fiemme, Italy	10 km Mass Start C	Stage World Cup	2nd
6	2007–08	28 December 2007 – 6 January 2008	(Czech Republic) (Italy) Tour de Ski	Overall Standings	World Cup	1st
7	2007–08	16 February 2008	Liberec, Czech Republic	7.6 km Individual F	World Cup	3rd
8	2007–08	8 March 2008	Oslo, Norway	30 km Individual F	World Cup	2nd
9	2008–09	22 November 2008	Gällivare, Sweden	10 km Individual F	World Cup	1st
10	2008–09	8 March 2009	Lahti, Finland	10 km Individual F	World Cup	2nd
11	2008–09	20 March 2009	Falun, Sweden	2.5 km Individual F	Stage World Cup	2nd
12	2008–09	20–22 March 2009	(Sweden) World Cup Final	Overall Standings	World Cup	3rd
13	2009–10	21 November 2009	Beitostølen, Norway	10 km Individual F	World Cup	2nd
14	2009–10	12 December 2009	Davos, Switzerland	10 km Individual F	World Cup	2nd
15	2009–10	5 February 2010	Canmore, Canada	10 km Individual F	World Cup	1st
16	2009–10	19 March 2010	Falun, Sweden	2.5 km Individual F	Stage World Cup	2nd
17	2009–10	21 March 2010	Falun, Sweden	10 km Pursuit F	Stage World Cup	1st
18	2009–10	19–21 March 2010	(Sweden) World Cup Final	Overall Standings	World Cup	3rd
19	2010–11	20 November 2010	Gällivare, Sweden	10 km Individual F	World Cup	2nd
20	2010–11	26–28 November 2010	(Finland) Nordic Opening	Overall Standings	World Cup	3rd
21	2010–11	31 December 2010	Oberhof, Germany	2.8 km Individual F	Stage World Cup	2nd
22	2010–11	3 January 2011	Oberstdorf, Germany	5 km + 5 km Pursuit C/F	Stage World Cup	2nd
23	2010–11	20 February 2011	Drammen, Norway	1.2 km Sprint F	World Cup	3rd
24	2011–12	19 November 2011	Sjusjøen, Norway	10 km Individual F	World Cup	2nd
25	2011–12	25 November 2011	Rukatunturi, Finland	1.2 km Sprint C	Stage World Cup	2nd
26	2011–12	26 November 2011	Rukatunturi, Finland	5 km Individual F	Stage World Cup	3rd
27	2011–12	7 January 2012	Val di Fiemme, Italy	10 km Mass Start C	Stage World Cup	3rd
28	2011–12	4 February 2012	Rybinsk, Russia	10 km Mass Start F	World Cup	2nd
29	2011–12	16 March 2012	Falun, Sweden	2.5 km Individual F	Stage World Cup	2nd
30	2011–12	18 March 2012	Falun, Sweden	10 km Pursuit F	Stage World Cup	2nd
31	2011–12	16–18 March 2012	(Sweden) World Cup Final	Overall Standings	World Cup	3rd
32	2012–13	29 December 2012	Oberhof, Germany	3 km Individual F	Stage World Cup	2nd
33	2012–13	3 January 2013	Cortina, Italy	15 km Pursuit F	Stage World Cup	2nd
34	2012–13	22 March 2013	Falun, Sweden	2.5 km Individual F	Stage World Cup	2nd
35	2012–13	24 March 2013	Falun, Sweden	10 km Pursuit F	Stage World Cup	3rd
36	2012–13	22–24 March 2013	(Sweden) World Cup Final	Overall Standings	World Cup	3rd
37	2013–14	1 December 2013	Rukatunturi, Finland	10 km Pursuit F	Stage World Cup	1st
38	2013–14	29 November 2013 – 1 December 2013	(Finland) Nordic Opening	Overall Standings	World Cup	2nd
39	2013–14	7 December 2013	Lillehammer, Norway	10 km Individual C	World Cup	2nd
40	2013–14	14 December 2013	Davos, Switzerland	15 km Individual F	World Cup	3rd
41	2013–14	1 February 2014	Toblach, Italy	10 km Individual C	World Cup	3rd
42	2013–14	2 March 2014	Lahti, Finland	10 km Individual F	World Cup	2nd
43	2014–15	30 November 2014	Rukatunturi, Finland	10 km Individual C	World Cup	3rd
44	2014–15	15 February 2015	Östersund, Sweden	10 km Individual F	World Cup	1st
45	2014–15	8 March 2015	Lahti, Finland	10 km Individual C	World Cup	3rd
46	2015–16	28 November 2015	Rukatunturi, Finland	5 km Individual F	Stage World Cup	2nd
47	2015–16	5 December 2015	Lillehammer, Norway	7.5 km + 7.5 km Skiathlon C/F	World Cup	2nd
48	2016–17	7 January 2017	Val di Fiemme, Italy	10 km Mass Start C	Stage World Cup	3rd
49	2016–17	21 January 2017	Ulricehamn, Sweden	10 km Individual F	World Cup	3rd
50	2016–17	19 February 2017	Otepää, Estonia	10 km Individual C	World Cup	2nd
51	2017–18	25 November 2017	Rukatunturi, Finland	10 km Individual C	Stage World Cup	2nd
52	2017–18	26 November 2017	Rukatunturi, Finland	10 km Pursuit F	Stage World Cup	3rd
53	2017–18	24–26 November 2017	(Finland) Nordic Opening	Overall Standings	World Cup	1st
54	2017–18	3 December 2017	Lillehammer, Norway	7.5 km + 7.5 km Skiathlon C/F	World Cup	1st
55	2017–18	16 December 2017	Toblach, Italy	10 km Individual F	World Cup	1st
56	2017–18	21 January 2018	Planica, Slovenia	10 km Individual C	World Cup	2nd
57	2018–19	25 November 2018	Rukatunturi, Finland	10 km Individual C	World Cup	2nd
58	2018–19	1 December 2018	Lillehammer, Norway	10 km Individual F	Stage World Cup	3rd
59	2018–19	8 December 2018	Beitostølen, Norway	15 km Individual F	World Cup	2nd

==== Team podiums ====
- 3 victories – (2 RL, 1 TS)
- 15 podiums – (14 RL, 1 TS)

No.	Season	Date	Location	Race	Level	Place	Teammate(s)
1	2006–07	17 December 2006	La Clusaz, France	4 × 5 km Relay C/F	World Cup	2nd	L. Andersson / Lindborg / Norgren
2	2006–07	4 February 2007	Davos, Switzerland	4 × 5 km Relay C/F	World Cup	1st	L. Andersson / Strömstedt / Norgren
3	2006–07	25 March 2007	La Clusaz, France	4 × 5 km Relay C/F	World Cup	3rd	Dahlberg / Rydqvist / Norgren
4	2007–08	28 October 2007	Düsseldorf, Germany	6 × 0.8 km Team Sprint F	World Cup	1st	Norgren
5	2008–09	23 November 2008	Gällivare, Sweden	4 × 5 km Relay C/F	World Cup	3rd	Hansson / Norgren / Haag
6	2008–09	7 December 2008	La Clusaz, France	4 × 5 km Relay C/F	World Cup	2nd	L. Andersson / Lindborg / Haag
7	2009–10	22 November 2009	Beitostølen, Norway	4 × 5 km Relay C/F	World Cup	1st	Olsson / Lindborg / Haag
8	2010–11	21 November 2010	Gällivare, Sweden	4 × 5 km Relay C/F	World Cup	2nd	Norgren / Haag / Rydqvist
9	2010–11	12 December 2010	La Clusaz, France	4 × 5 km Relay C/F	World Cup	3rd	Lindborg / Haag / Rydqvist
10	2012–13	25 November 2012	Gällivare, Sweden	4 × 5 km Relay C/F	World Cup	2nd	Ingemarsdotter / Bleckur / Larsen
11	2016–17	22 January 2017	Ulricehamn, Sweden	4 × 5 km Relay C/F	World Cup	3rd	Ingemarsdotter / Henriksson / Falk
12	2018–19	27 January 2019	Ulricehamn, Sweden	4 × 5 km Relay C/F	World Cup	2nd	Settlin / E. Andersson / Sundling
13	2019–20	8 December 2019	Lillehammer, Norway	4 × 5 km Relay C/F	World Cup	3rd	Ribom / Rönnlund / Lundgren
14	2019–20	1 March 2020	Lahti, Finland	4 × 5 km Relay C/F	World Cup	3rd	Karlsson / Öhrn / Dahlqvist
15	2020–21	24 January 2021	Lahti, Finland	4 × 5 km Relay C/F	World Cup	2nd	Ribom / Modig / E. Andersson
