= Marit Bjørgen =

Norwegian cross-country skier

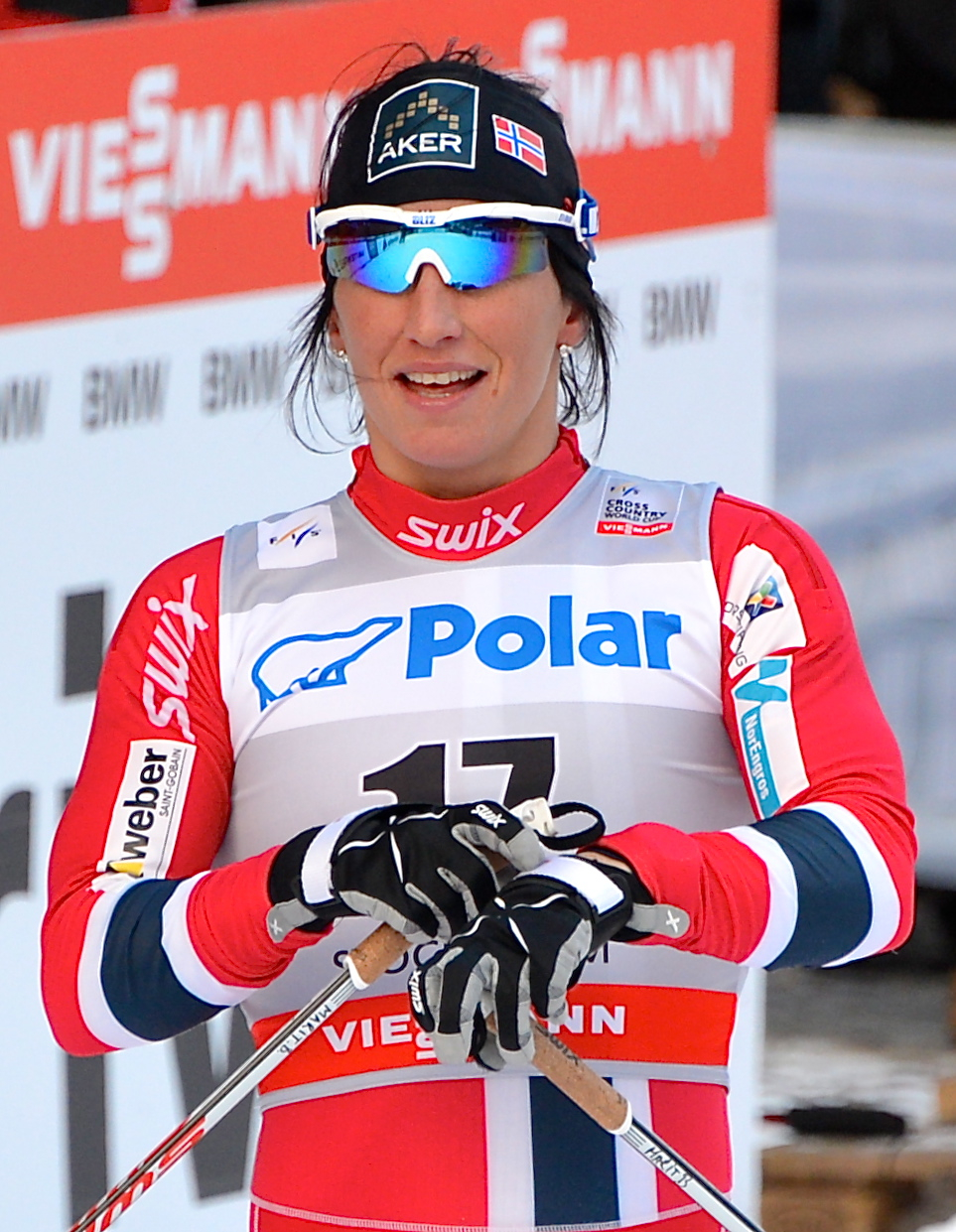
- Bjørgen during FIS Cross-Country Skiing World Cup sprint competitions in Stockholm, Sweden in March 2013

Personal information
- Nationality: Norway
- Born: 21 March 1980 (age 46) Trondheim, Norway
- Height: 1.68 m (5 ft 6 in)
- Spouse: Fred Børre Lundberg

Sport
- Sport: Skiing
- Club: Rognes IL

World Cup career
- Seasons: 18 – (2000–2015, 2017–2018)
- Indiv. starts: 303
- Indiv. podiums: 184
- Indiv. wins: 114
- Team starts: 44
- Team podiums: 37
- Team wins: 30
- Overall titles: 4 – (2005, 2006, 2012, 2015)
- Discipline titles: 8 – (3 DI, 5 SP)
Medal record
Women's cross-country skiing
Representing Norway
International nordic ski competitions
Event	1st	2nd	3rd
Olympic Games	8	4	3
World Championships	18	5	3
Total	26	9	6
Olympic Games
Gold medal – first place	2010 Vancouver	Individual sprint
Gold medal – first place	2010 Vancouver	15 km pursuit
Gold medal – first place	2010 Vancouver	4 × 5 km relay
Gold medal – first place	2014 Sochi	15 km skiathlon
Gold medal – first place	2014 Sochi	30 km freestyle
Gold medal – first place	2014 Sochi	Team sprint
Gold medal – first place	2018 Pyeongchang	4 × 5 km relay
Gold medal – first place	2018 Pyeongchang	30 km classical
Silver medal – second place	2002 Salt Lake City	4 × 5 km relay
Silver medal – second place	2006 Turin	10 km classical
Silver medal – second place	2010 Vancouver	30 km classical
Silver medal – second place	2018 Pyeongchang	15 km skiathlon
Bronze medal – third place	2010 Vancouver	10 km freestyle
Bronze medal – third place	2018 Pyeongchang	10 km freestyle
Bronze medal – third place	2018 Pyeongchang	Team sprint
World Championships
Gold medal – first place	2003 Val di Fiemme	Individual sprint
Gold medal – first place	2005 Oberstdorf	Team sprint
Gold medal – first place	2005 Oberstdorf	30 km classical
Gold medal – first place	2005 Oberstdorf	4 × 5 km relay
Gold medal – first place	2011 Oslo	Individual sprint
Gold medal – first place	2011 Oslo	15 km skiathlon
Gold medal – first place	2011 Oslo	10 km classical
Gold medal – first place	2011 Oslo	4 × 5 km relay
Gold medal – first place	2013 Val di Fiemme	Individual sprint
Gold medal – first place	2013 Val di Fiemme	15 km skiathlon
Gold medal – first place	2013 Val di Fiemme	4 × 5 km relay
Gold medal – first place	2013 Val di Fiemme	30 km classical
Gold medal – first place	2015 Falun	Individual sprint
Gold medal – first place	2015 Falun	4 × 5 km relay
Gold medal – first place	2017 Lahti	10 km classical
Gold medal – first place	2017 Lahti	15 km skiathlon
Gold medal – first place	2017 Lahti	4 × 5 km relay
Gold medal – first place	2017 Lahti	30 km freestyle
Silver medal – second place	2003 Val di Fiemme	4 × 5 km relay
Silver medal – second place	2005 Oberstdorf	15 km skiathlon
Silver medal – second place	2011 Oslo	30 km freestyle
Silver medal – second place	2013 Val di Fiemme	10 km freestyle
Silver medal – second place	2015 Falun	30 km classical
Bronze medal – third place	2005 Oberstdorf	10 km freestyle
Bronze medal – third place	2007 Sapporo	Team sprint
Bronze medal – third place	2007 Sapporo	4 × 5 km relay
Junior World Championships
Bronze medal – third place	1999 Saalfelden	4 × 5 km relay
Bronze medal – third place	2000 Štrbské Pleso	4 × 5 km relay

Marit Bjørgen (born 21 March 1980) is a former Norwegian cross-country skier. She is ranked first in the all-time Cross-Country World Cup rankings with 114 individual victories. Bjørgen is also the most successful sprinter in Cross-Country World Cup history, with 29 victories. She headed the medal table at the 2010 Winter Olympics by winning five medals, including three gold. A five-time Olympian, her five Olympic medals at the 2018 Pyeongchang Games brought her total number of medals up to a record 15, making her the most decorated Winter Olympian of all time and the third-most decorated Olympian of all time.

On 6 April 2018, Bjørgen announced her retirement from cross-country skiing following the 2017–18 season. In May 2020, she announced that she would return to competition with long-distance cross-country ski squad Team Ragde Eiendom, with a focus on competing in Vasaloppet in March 2021.

On 28 April 2022, she announced the end of her career by also finishing her long-distance career.

== World Cup ==
Marit Bjørgen initially excelled at the sprint events, and seven victories in that event was enough to give her second place overall in the 2003–04 FIS Cross-Country World Cup season. However, in the 2004–05 season, Bjørgen became an accomplished distance skier.

On 19 March 2006 in Sapporo, Japan, Bjørgen claimed her second FIS World Cup title. Bjørgen led the overall World Cup by 66 points, ahead of Canada's Beckie Scott going into the final race of the season, the 2 x 7.5 km double pursuit. Scott needed to win the race and for Bjørgen to finish no higher than eighth to claim the title. Scott did win the race but Bjørgen came fourth, winning the crystal globe with 1036 points to Scott's 1020. Bjørgen also won the sprint title for the season, 6 points ahead of Norway's Ella Gjømle, making the 2005–06 season the fourth season in a row that Bjørgen won the sprint title. Bjørgen finished the distance standings in fourth place, 108 points behind Russia's Julija Tchepalova.

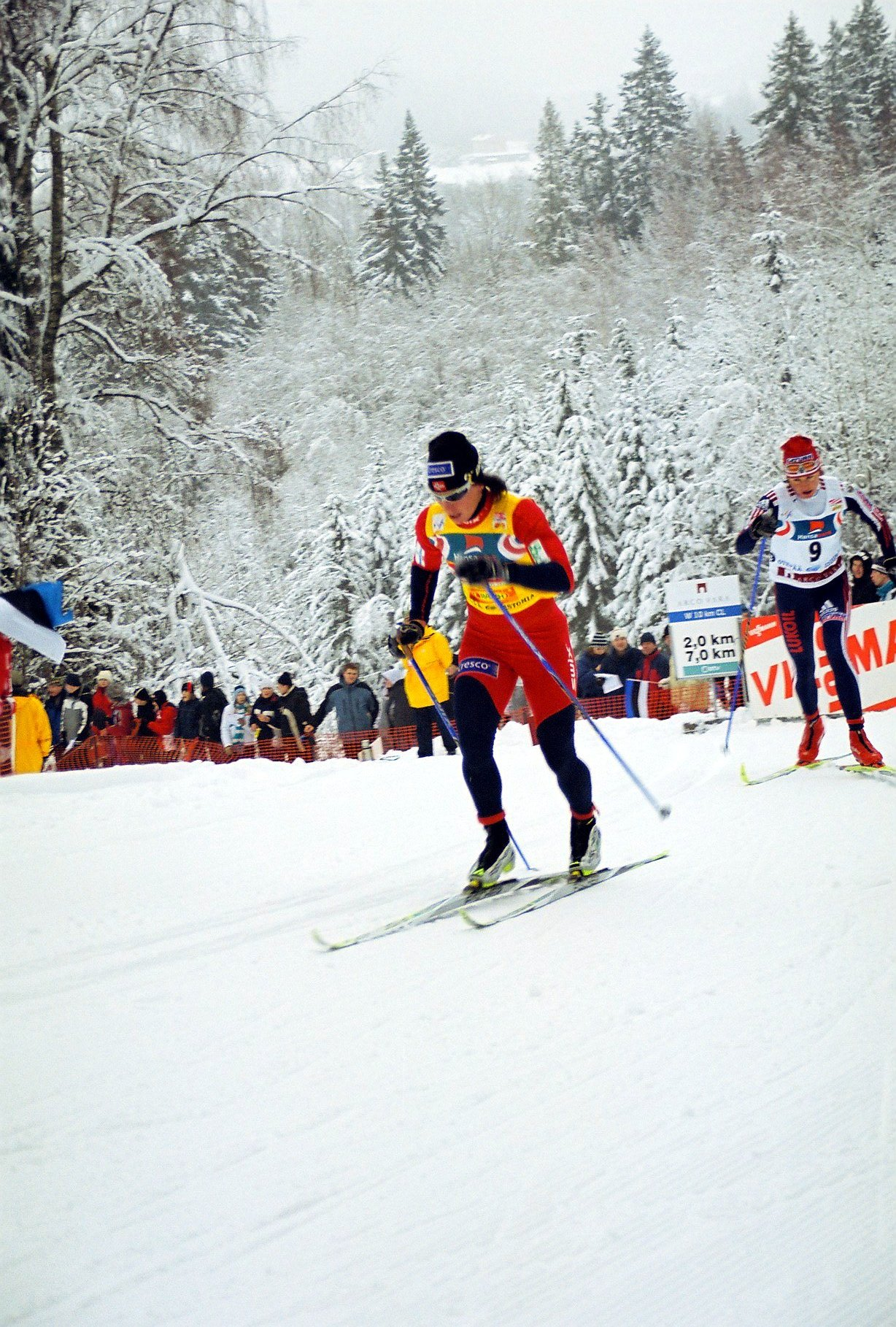
Marit Bjørgen in Otepää during the 2005–06 FIS Cross-Country World Cup

Bjørgen made the podium eight times during the 2005–06 season, six of them in first place, one second and one third place. Bjørgen now has 70 podium finishes, 46 of them in first place, 13 in second and 11 in third. 22 of her victories have been in the sprint, which is by far her most successful event. Seven of these victories were in the 2003–04 season and they had decreased in the previous few seasons whilst her results in the other disciplines improved. She has nine victories in the 10 km and seven in the pursuit. Her four other victories have been in longer races (30 km. and Vasaloppet).

Bjørgen has competed in the World Cup since 2000, when she finished the season in 53rd place overall and 48th in the sprints. The season after, she finished the overall season in 32nd and the sprint in 36th. The following season (2002–03), she won the sprint title and finished in 6th place overall. The 2003–04 season was Bjørgen's best season up until that time when she again won the sprint title, and came 11th in the distance standings, finishing the season in 2nd place behind Gabriella Paruzzi. In the 2004–05 season she won all the titles, and again won the overall and sprint title in 2005–06. In 2011–12 she claimed the overall title for the third time, ahead of Poland's Justyna Kowalczyk.

In 2015 Bjørgen won her first Tour de Ski after nine attempts, defeating reigning champion and compatriot Therese Johaug by over one and a half minutes.

== World Championships ==
Bjørgen has eighteen World Championship gold medals, twelve of them individual. Her first gold medal in the World Championships came in the individual sprint in Val di Fiemme in 2003, where she also picked up a silver in the 4 × 5 km. She took three medals in Oberstdorf in 2005 in the 30 km classical, team sprint, and 4 × 5 km. She also won a silver in the 7.5 km + 7.5 km double pursuit and a bronze in the 10 km free in the same games. At the 2007 championships in Sapporo, Bjørgen won two bronze medals in team sprint (with Astrid Jacobsen) and in the 4 × 5 km. In Holmenkollen 2011 she won the individual sprint, the pursuit, the 10 km classical, the 4 × 5 km, and a silver in the 30km. In the 2013 Val di Fiemme World Championships she won the individual sprint, the double pursuit, the 4 x 5 km, the 30 km, and a silver in the 10 km freestyle.

In the World Championships 2011, held at Holmenkollen, Oslo, during February and March 2011, Bjørgen won gold medals in the Sprint, the 10-kilometre classic, the 15-kilometre pursuit and the 4 × 5-kilometre relay. She also finished second to Therese Johaug in the 30-kilometre freestyle.

== Olympics ==
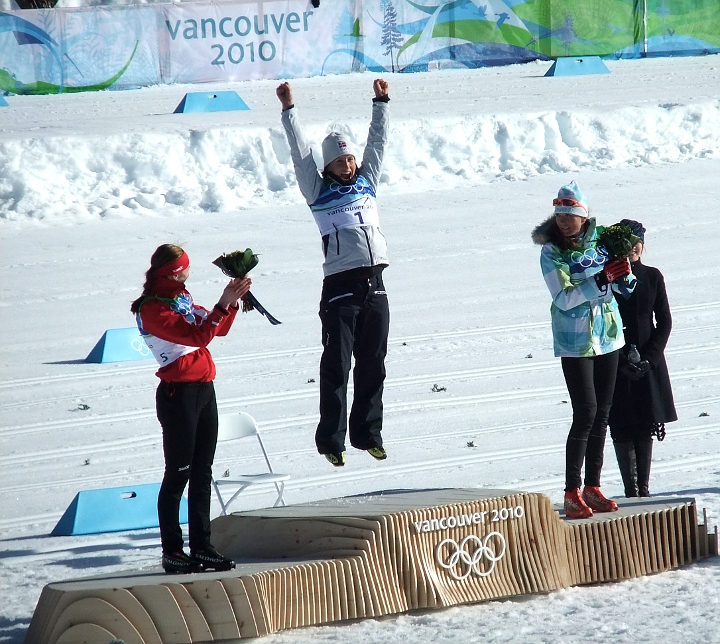
Marit Bjørgen celebrates sprint gold at the 2010 Olympics

Bjørgen had a disappointing Winter Olympics in Turin. She suffered from bronchitis a week before the games started and was prescribed antibiotics, then in the first race of the games, the 7.5 km + 7.5 km double pursuit, Bjørgen withdrew during the classic phase complaining of an upset stomach. In the next event, the team sprint, Bjørgen and Hilde G. Pedersen came fourth, and despite winning a silver in the 10 km, the remainder of the games went poorly for her. The next event was the 4 × 5 km relay, where Bjørgen took the anchor leg and finished in fifth place, the first time since 1988 that Norway had failed to reach the podium in the women's relay. In the individual sprint, Bjørgen failed to make the semi-finals, and both Bjørgen and Pedersen decided not to compete in the 30 km and returned home to Norway. Afterwards she was quoted as saying she was "sick and tired of Pragelato and OL (Olympic games)".

However Bjørgen recovered to win the 45 km Vasaloppet from Oxberg to Mora on 4 March, eight days after the end of the Winter Olympics. Bjørgen broke away with Hilde Pedersen and Vibeke Skofterud after only 10 km, but Skofterud could not keep up with the pace and fell back, and Bjørgen powered away from Pedersen with a few kilometres left, winning in a time of 2:17:53, 1:22 ahead of Pedersen and 3:23 ahead of Petra Majdič of Slovenia. Winning a purse of 88,000 SEK and also winning two of the three sprints during the race to add another 10,000 SEK. Then three days later on 7 March, Bjørgen finished second in the individual sprint event in Borlänge, Sweden.

In the 2010 Winter Olympics in Vancouver, Bjørgen finished third in the 10 km freestyle event, before winning her first Olympic gold medal in the sprint. In the sprint she was up against a very strong field, consisting of Petra Majdič of Slovenia who had taken a serious fall earlier in the day during warm-up, and Justyna Kowalczyk of Poland who was leading the overall World Cup standings coming into the race. Bjørgen won her second gold in the 2 × 7.5-kilometre on 19 February 2010. Bjørgen was also part of the 4 × 5 km relay team that won gold on 25 February 2010, finishing with enough time to cross the line with a large Norwegian flag given to her by a spectator near the finish, and jumping over the finish line. She closed out her trip in Vancouver by taking silver 0.3 seconds behind Poland's Justyna Kowalczyk in the women's 30 km event.

Bjørgen won gold at the 2014 Winter Olympics in Sochi in the 15 km skiathlon, the Team sprint and the 30km freestyle race. These three Olympic medals brought her total up to ten, equaling the record for most Winter Olympic medals held by a woman, already achieved by Stefania Belmondo and Raisa Smetanina; but of the three record holders at the time, Bjørgen had the most golds.

Bjørgen is a five-time Olympian, having competed in every Winter Olympics since Salt Lake City in 2002 where she won her first silver medal. At the 2018 Winter Olympics in Pyeongchang she won her 11th–15th Olympic medals, the highest number of medals won by any athlete in Winter Olympics history.

== Holmenkollen ==
Bjørgen won the women's 30 km event at the Holmenkollen ski festival in 2005. She won the same event five years later in 2010. This was the first World Cup event to be held at Holmenkollen since the completion of the new ski jumping hill. For her win in both the 30 km and the sprint event, along with her successes at the 2010 Games in Vancouver, Bjørgen was awarded the Holmenkollen medal. On 11 March 2018, Bjørgen won a record seventh 30 km in Holmenkollen.

== International Fair Play Mecenate Award ==
Bjørgen was awarded the International Fair Play Mecenate award for 2014. The jury of the Fair Play Mecenate consists of members from all continents and represents the international sports media and various international sports organisations. The jury states that the Fair Play Mecenate is awarded Marit Bjørgen "for the particular ethical and fair play behaviour that you have always had both in your agonistic career and in your demonstrations of great sportsmanship and solidarity".

== Asthma medications ==
In the 2009–2010 season Bjørgen had a Therapeutic Use Exemption (TUE) issued by the International Ski Federation (FIS) for the asthma medication Symbicort which contained substances on the World Anti-Doping Agency (WADA) prohibited list. Bjørgen continued to use the medication over the 2010 Olympics and was strongly criticized by Justyna Kowalczyk who accused her of doping. As of September 2011 athletes no longer need a TUE for Symbicort, and the drug can be used by any athlete but only in a restricted dose.

== Cross-country skiing results ==
All results are sourced from the International Ski Federation (FIS).

=== Olympic Games ===
- 15 medals – (8 gold, 4 silver, 3 bronze)

Year	Age	10 km	15 km	Pursuit	30 km	Sprint	4 × 5 km relay	Team sprint
2002	21	—	50	—	14	—	Silver	—N/a
2006	25	Silver	—N/a	DNF	—	18	5	4
2010	29	Bronze	—N/a	Gold	Silver	Gold	Gold	—
2014	33	5	—N/a	Gold	Gold	11	5	Gold
2018	37	Bronze	—N/a	Silver	Gold	—	Gold	Bronze

=== World Championships ===
- 26 medals – (18 gold, 5 silver, 3 bronze)

Year	Age	10 km	15 km	Pursuit	30 km	Sprint	4 × 5 km relay	Team sprint
2001	20	24	—	19	CNX^{[a]}	—	—	—N/a
2003	22	—	24	—	—	Gold	Silver	—N/a
2005	24	Bronze	—N/a	Silver	Gold	16	Gold	Gold
2007	26	22	—N/a	12	9	10	Bronze	Bronze
2009	28	16	—N/a	19	—	9	4	—
2011	30	Gold	—N/a	Gold	Silver	Gold	Gold	—
2013	32	Silver	—N/a	Gold	Gold	Gold	Gold	—
2015	34	31	—N/a	6	Silver	Gold	Gold	—
2017	36	Gold	—N/a	Gold	Gold	16	Gold	—

a. ^{1} Cancelled due to extremely cold weather.

=== World Cup ===
==== Season titles ====
- 12 titles – (4 Overall, 3 Distance, 5 Sprint)

Season	
Season	Discipline
2003	Sprint
2004	Sprint
2005	Overall
2005	Distance
2005	Sprint
2006	Overall
2006	Sprint
2012	Overall
2012	Distance
2015	Overall
2015	Distance
2015	Sprint

==== Season standings ====
Season	Age	Discipline standings					Ski Tour standings		
Season	Age	Overall	Distance	Long Distance	Middle Distance	Sprint	Nordic Opening	Tour de Ski	World Cup Final
2000	20	NC	—N/a	NC	—	NC	—N/a	—N/a	—N/a
2001	21	53	—N/a	—N/a	—N/a	48	—N/a	—N/a	—N/a
2002	22	32	—N/a	—N/a	—N/a	36	—N/a	—N/a	—N/a
2003	23	6	—N/a	—N/a	—N/a	1st place, gold medalist(s)	—N/a	—N/a	—N/a
2004	24	2nd place, silver medalist(s)	11	—N/a	—N/a	1st place, gold medalist(s)	—N/a	—N/a	—N/a
2005	25	1st place, gold medalist(s)	1st place, gold medalist(s)	—N/a	—N/a	1st place, gold medalist(s)	—N/a	—N/a	—N/a
2006	26	1st place, gold medalist(s)	4	—N/a	—N/a	1st place, gold medalist(s)	—N/a	—N/a	—N/a
2007	27	2nd place, silver medalist(s)	4	—N/a	—N/a	6	—N/a	2nd place, silver medalist(s)	—N/a
2008	28	11	6	—N/a	—N/a	16	—N/a	DNF	6
2009	29	10	9	—N/a	—N/a	14	—N/a	10	20
2010	30	2nd place, silver medalist(s)	2nd place, silver medalist(s)	—N/a	—N/a	2nd place, silver medalist(s)	—N/a	—	1st place, gold medalist(s)
2011	31	2nd place, silver medalist(s)	2nd place, silver medalist(s)	—N/a	—N/a	4	1st place, gold medalist(s)	—	1st place, gold medalist(s)
2012	32	1st place, gold medalist(s)	1st place, gold medalist(s)	—N/a	—N/a	3rd place, bronze medalist(s)	1st place, gold medalist(s)	2nd place, silver medalist(s)	1st place, gold medalist(s)
2013	33	4	6	—N/a	—N/a	7	1st place, gold medalist(s)	—	1st place, gold medalist(s)
2014	34	2nd place, silver medalist(s)	2nd place, silver medalist(s)	—N/a	—N/a	3rd place, bronze medalist(s)	1st place, gold medalist(s)	DNF	2nd place, silver medalist(s)
2015	35	1st place, gold medalist(s)	1st place, gold medalist(s)	—N/a	—N/a	1st place, gold medalist(s)	1st place, gold medalist(s)	1st place, gold medalist(s)	—N/a
2017	37	5	2nd place, silver medalist(s)	—N/a	—N/a	15	4	—	1st place, gold medalist(s)
2018	38	5	5	—N/a	—N/a	26	2nd place, silver medalist(s)	—	1st place, gold medalist(s)

==== Individual podiums ====
- 114 victories – (84 WC, 30 SWC)
- 184 podiums – (126 WC, 58 SWC)

No.	Season	Date	Location	Race	Level	Place
1	2002–03	26 October 2002	Düsseldorf, Germany	2.0 km Sprint F	World Cup	1st
2	2002–03	11 December 2002	Clusone, Italy	1.4 km Sprint F	World Cup	1st
3	2002–03	15 December 2002	Cogne, Italy	1.0 km Sprint C	World Cup	2nd
4	2002–03	21 December 2002	Ramsau, Austria	5 km + 5 km Pursuit C/F	World Cup	2nd
5	2002–03	12 February 2003	Reit im Winkl, Germany	1.0 km Sprint F	World Cup	1st
6	2002–03	20 March 2003	Borlänge, Sweden	1.0 km Sprint F	World Cup	3rd
7	2003–04	16 December 2003	Val di Fiemme, Italy	1.2 km Sprint C	World Cup	1st
8	2003–04	18 January 2004	Nové Město, Czech Republic	1.2 km Sprint F	World Cup	1st
9	2003–04	18 February 2004	Stockholm, Sweden	1.1 km Sprint C	World Cup	1st
10	2003–04	21 February 2004	Umeå, Sweden	10 km Individual C	World Cup	3rd
11	2003–04	24 February 2004	Trondheim, Norway	1.5 km Sprint F	World Cup	1st
12	2003–04	26 February 2004	Drammen, Norway	1.2 km Sprint C	World Cup	1st
13	2003–04	5 March 2004	Lahti, Finland	1.0 km Sprint F	World Cup	1st
14	2003–04	12 March 2004	Pragelato, Italy	1.0 km Sprint F	World Cup	1st
15	2004–05	23 October 2004	Düsseldorf, Germany	0.8 km Sprint F	World Cup	1st
16	2004–05	20 November 2004	Gällivare, Sweden	10 km Individual C	World Cup	1st
17	2004–05	28 November 2004	Rukatunturi, Finland	10 km Individual C	World Cup	3rd
18	2004–05	5 December 2004	Bern, Switzerland	0.8 km Sprint F	World Cup	1st
19	2004–05	11 December 2004	Val di Fiemme, Italy	7.5 km + 7.5 km Pursuit C/F	World Cup	1st
20	2004–05	14 December 2004	Asiago, Italy	1.2 km Sprint C	World Cup	1st
21	2004–05	8 January 2005	Otepää, Estonia	10 km Individual C	World Cup	1st
22	2004–05	15 January 2005	Nové Město, Czech Republic	10 km Individual F	World Cup	2nd
23	2004–05	16 January 2005	Nové Město, Czech Republic	1.2 km Sprint F	World Cup	1st
24	2004–05	13 February 2005	Reit im Winkl, Germany	1.5 km Sprint C	World Cup	2nd
25	2004–05	12 March 2005	Oslo, Norway	30 km Individual C	World Cup	1st
26	2004–05	16 March 2005	Gothenburg, Sweden	1.0 km Sprint F	World Cup	1st
27	2004–05	19 March 2005	Falun, Sweden	7.5 km + 7.5 km Pursuit C/F	World Cup	1st
28	2005–06	22 October 2005	Düsseldorf, Germany	0.8 km Sprint F	World Cup	1st
29	2005–06	19 November 2005	Beitostølen, Norway	10 km Individual C	World Cup	1st
30	2005–06	26 November 2005	Rukatunturi, Finland	10 km Individual C	World Cup	1st
31	2005–06	10 December 2005	Vernon, Canada	7.5 km + 7.5 km Pursuit C/F	World Cup	1st
32	2005–06	14 January 2006	Lago di Tesero, Italy	15 km Mass Start F	World Cup	3rd
33	2005–06	4 March 2006	Mora, Sweden	45 km Mass Start C	World Cup	1st
34	2005–06	7 March 2006	Borlänge, Sweden	0.75 km Sprint F	World Cup	2nd
35	2005–06	15 March 2006	Changchun, China	1.0 km Sprint F	World Cup	1st
36	2006–07	28 October 2006	Düsseldorf, Germany	0.8 km Sprint F	World Cup	1st
37	2006–07	18 November 2006	Gällivare, Sweden	10 km Individual F	World Cup	3rd
38	2006–07	25 November 2006	Rukatunturi, Finland	1.2 km Sprint C	World Cup	3rd
39	2006–07	26 November 2006	Rukatunturi, Finland	10 km Individual C	World Cup	2nd
40	2006–07	31 December 2006	Munich, Germany	1.1 km Sprint F	Stage World Cup	1st
41	2006–07	5 January 2007	Asiago, Italy	1.2 km Sprint F	Stage World Cup	2nd
42	2006–07	6 January 2007	Cavalese, Italy	15 km Mass Start C	Stage World Cup	3rd
43	2006–07	31 December 2006 – 7 January 2007	(Germany) (Italy) Tour de Ski	Overall Standings	World Cup	2nd
44	2006–07	3 February 2007	Davos, Switzerland	10 km Individual F	World Cup	3rd
45	2006–07	24 March 2007	Falun, Sweden	7.5 km + 7.5 km Pursuit C/F	World Cup	1st
46	2007–08	27 October 2007	Düsseldorf, Germany	0.8 km Sprint F	World Cup	2nd
47	2007–08	24 November 2007	Beitostølen, Norway	10 km Individual F	World Cup	1st
48	2007–08	2 December 2007	Rukatunturi, Finland	10 km Individual C	World Cup	1st
49	2007–08	29 December 2007	Nové Město, Czech Republic	10 km Pursuit F	Stage World Cup	3rd
50	2007–08	30 December 2007	Nové Město, Czech Republic	1.0 km Sprint F	Stage World Cup	3rd
51	2007–08	23 February 2008	Falun, Sweden	7.5 km + 7.5 km Pursuit C/F	World Cup	2nd
52	2008–09	22 November 2008	Gällivare, Sweden	10 km Individual F	World Cup	2nd
53	2008–09	30 November 2008	Rukatunturi, Finland	10 km Individual C	World Cup	3rd
54	2008–09	13 December 2008	Davos, Switzerland	10 km Individual C	World Cup	3rd
55	2008–09	14 December 2008	Davos, Switzerland	1.4 km Sprint F	World Cup	3rd
56	2008–09	28 December 2008	Oberhof, Germany	10 km Pursuit C	Stage World Cup	2nd
57	2008–09	31 December 2008	Nové Město, Czech Republic	9 km Individual C	Stage World Cup	3rd
58	2009–10	21 November 2009	Beitostølen, Norway	10 km Individual F	World Cup	1st
59	2009–10	13 December 2009	Davos, Switzerland	1.0 km Sprint F	World Cup	2nd
60	2009–10	19 December 2009	Rogla, Slovenia	1.0 km Sprint C	World Cup	1st
61	2009–10	20 December 2009	Rogla, Slovenia	15 km Mass Start C	World Cup	2nd
62	2009–10	16 January 2010	Otepää, Estonia	10 km Individual C	World Cup	2nd
63	2009–10	6 March 2010	Lahti, Finland	7.5 km + 7.5 km Pursuit C/F	World Cup	1st
64	2009–10	11 March 2010	Drammen, Norway	1.0 km Sprint C	World Cup	1st
65	2009–10	13 March 2010	Oslo, Norway	30 km Mass Start F	World Cup	1st
66	2009–10	14 March 2010	Oslo, Norway	1.0 km Sprint F	World Cup	1st
67	2009–10	17 March 2010	Stockholm, Sweden	1.1 km Sprint C	Stage World Cup	3rd
68	2009–10	19 March 2010	Falun, Sweden	2.5 km Individual C	Stage World Cup	2nd
69	2009–10	20 March 2010	Falun, Sweden	5 km + 5 km Pursuit C/F	Stage World Cup	1st
70	2009–10	19–21 March 2010	(Sweden) World Cup Final	Overall Standings	World Cup	1st
71	2010–11	20 November 2010	Gällivare, Sweden	10 km Individual F	World Cup	1st
72	2010–11	26 November 2010	Rukatunturi, Finland	1.2 km Sprint C	Stage World Cup	1st
73	2010–11	27 November 2010	Rukatunturi, Finland	5 km Individual C	Stage World Cup	1st
74	2010–11	26–28 November 2010	(Finland) Nordic Opening	Overall Standings	World Cup	1st
75	2010–11	11 December 2010	Davos, Switzerland	10 km Individual C	World Cup	1st
76	2010–11	12 December 2010	Davos, Switzerland	1.4 km Sprint F	World Cup	1st
77	2010–11	18 December 2010	La Clusaz, France	15 km Mass Start F	World Cup	1st
78	2010–11	22 January 2011	Otepää, Estonia	10 km Individual C	World Cup	1st
79	2010–11	19 February 2011	Drammen, Norway	10 km Individual C	World Cup	1st
80	2010–11	13 March 2011	Lahti, Finland	1.4 km Sprint C	World Cup	1st
81	2010–11	16 March 2011	Stockholm, Sweden	1.0 km Sprint C	Stage World Cup	2nd
82	2010–11	18 March 2011	Falun, Sweden	2.5 km Individual C	Stage World Cup	1st
83	2010–11	19 March 2011	Falun, Sweden	5 km + 5 km Pursuit C/F	Stage World Cup	1st
84	2010–11	16–20 March 2011	(Sweden) World Cup Final	Overall Standings	World Cup	1st
85	2011–12	19 November 2011	Sjusjøen, Norway	10 km Individual F	World Cup	1st
86	2011–12	25 November 2011	Rukatunturi, Finland	1.2 km Sprint C	Stage World Cup	1st
87	2011–12	26 November 2011	Rukatunturi, Finland	5 km Individual F	Stage World Cup	1st
88	2011–12	27 November 2011	Rukatunturi, Finland	5 km + 5 km Pursuit C/F	Stage World Cup	2nd
89	2011–12	25–27 November 2011	(Finland) Nordic Opening	Overall Standings	World Cup	1st
90	2011–12	10 December 2011	Davos, Switzerland	15 km Individual F	World Cup	1st
91	2011–12	29 December 2011	Oberhof, Germany	2.5 km Individual F	Stage World Cup	2nd
92	2011–12	30 December 2011	Oberhof, Germany	10 km Pursuit C	Stage World Cup	3rd
93	2011–12	31 December 2011	Oberstdorf, Germany	1.2 km Sprint C	Stage World Cup	2nd
94	2011–12	1 January 2012	Oberstdorf, Germany	5 km + 5 km Skiathlon C/F	Stage World Cup	1st
95	2011–12	3 January 2012	Toblach, Italy	3.3 km Individual C	Stage World Cup	1st
96	2011–12	4 January 2012	Toblach, Italy	1.3 km Sprint F	Stage World Cup	1st
97	2011–12	5 January 2012	Toblach, Italy	15 km Pursuit F	Stage World Cup	1st
98	2011–12	7 January 2012	Val di Fiemme, Italy	10 km Mass Start C	Stage World Cup	2nd
99	2011–12	8 January 2012	Val di Fiemme, Italy	9 km Pursuit F	Stage World Cup	3rd
100	2011–12	29 December 2011 – 8 January 2012	(Germany) (Italy) Tour de Ski	Overall Standings	World Cup	2nd
101	2011–12	21 January 2012	Otepää, Estonia	1.2 km Sprint C	World Cup	2nd
102	2011–12	22 January 2012	Otepää, Estonia	10 km Individual C	World Cup	2nd
103	2011–12	4 February 2012	Rybinsk, Russia	10 km Mass Start F	World Cup	1st
104	2011–12	5 February 2012	Rybinsk, Russia	7.5 km + 7.5 km Skiathlon C/F	World Cup	3rd
105	2011–12	11 February 2012	Nové Město, Czech Republic	15 km Mass Start C	World Cup	1st
106	2011–12	18 February 2012	Szklarska Poręba, Poland	10 km Individual C	World Cup	2nd
107	2011–12	3 March 2012	Lahti, Finland	7.5 km + 7.5 km Skiathlon C/F	World Cup	2nd
108	2011–12	4 March 2012	Lahti, Finland	1.4 km Sprint C	World Cup	1st
109	2011–12	7 March 2012	Drammen, Norway	1.2 km Sprint C	World Cup	1st
110	2011–12	11 March 2012	Oslo, Norway	30 km Mass Start C	World Cup	1st
111	2011–12	14 March 2012	Stockholm, Sweden	1.0 km Sprint C	Stage World Cup	1st
112	2011–12	16 March 2012	Falun, Sweden	2.5 km Individual F	Stage World Cup	1st
113	2011–12	14–18 March 2012	(Sweden) World Cup Final	Overall Standings	World Cup	1st
114	2012–13	24 November 2012	Gällivare, Sweden	10 km Individual F	World Cup	1st
115	2012–13	30 November 2012	Rukatunturi, Finland	1.4 km Sprint C	Stage World Cup	1st
116	2012–13	1 December 2012	Rukatunturi, Finland	5 km Individual F	Stage World Cup	1st
117	2012–13	2 December 2012	Rukatunturi, Finland	10 km Pursuit C	Stage World Cup	1st
118	2012–13	30 November – 2 December 2012	(Finland) Nordic Opening	Overall Standings	World Cup	1st
119	2012–13	19 January 2013	La Clusaz, France	10 km Mass Start C	World Cup	1st
120	2012–13	16 February 2013	Davos, Switzerland	1.2 km Sprint C	World Cup	2nd
121	2012–13	9 March 2013	Lahti, Finland	1.55 km Sprint F	World Cup	2nd
122	2012–13	10 March 2013	Lahti, Finland	10 km Individual C	World Cup	2nd
123	2012–13	20 March 2013	Stockholm, Sweden	1.1 km Sprint C	Stage World Cup	2nd
124	2012–13	22 March 2013	Falun, Sweden	2.5 km Individual F	Stage World Cup	1st
125	2012–13	23 March 2013	Falun, Sweden	10 km Mass Start C	Stage World Cup	1st
126	2012–13	20–24 March 2013	(Sweden) World Cup Final	Overall Standings	World Cup	1st
127	2013–14	30 November 2013	Rukatunturi, Finland	5 km Individual C	Stage World Cup	2nd
128	2013–14	1 December 2013	Rukatunturi, Finland	10 km Pursuit F	Stage World Cup	3rd
129	2013–14	29 November – 1 December 2013	(Finland) Nordic Opening	Overall Standings	World Cup	1st
130	2013–14	7 December 2013	Lillehammer, Norway	10 km Individual C	World Cup	3rd
131	2013–14	14 December 2013	Davos, Switzerland	15 km Individual F	World Cup	1st
132	2013–14	15 December 2013	Davos, Switzerland	1.5 km Sprint F	World Cup	1st
133	2013–14	28 December 2013	Oberhof, Germany	3 km Individual F	Stage World Cup	1st
134	2013–14	1 February 2014	Toblach, Italy	10 km Individual C	World Cup	1st
135	2013–14	2 February 2014	Toblach, Italy	1.3 km Sprint F	World Cup	1st
136	2013–14	2 March 2014	Lahti, Finland	10 km Individual F	World Cup	1st
137	2013–14	5 March 2014	Drammen, Norway	1.3 km Sprint C	World Cup	2nd
138	2013–14	9 March 2014	Oslo, Norway	30 km Mass Start C	World Cup	1st
139	2013–14	14 March 2014	Falun, Sweden	1.2 km Sprint C	Stage World Cup	1st
140	2013–14	15 March 2014	Falun, Sweden	7.5 km + 7.5 km Skiathlon C/F	Stage World Cup	2nd
141	2013–14	16 March 2014	Falun, Sweden	10 km Pursuit F	Stage World Cup	2nd
142	2013–14	14–16 March 2014	(Sweden) World Cup Final	Overall Standings	World Cup	2nd
143	2014–15	29 November 2014	Rukatunturi, Finland	1.4 km Sprint C	World Cup	1st
144	2014–15	30 November 2014	Rukatunturi, Finland	10 km Individual C	World Cup	2nd
145	2014–15	5 December 2014	Lillehammer, Norway	1.5 km Sprint F	Stage World Cup	1st
146	2014–15	6 December 2014	Lillehammer, Norway	5 km Individual F	Stage World Cup	2nd
147	2014–15	7 December 2014	Lillehammer, Norway	10 km Pursuit C	Stage World Cup	3rd
148	2014–15	5–7 December 2014	(Norway) Nordic Opening	Overall Standings	World Cup	1st
149	2014–15	13 December 2014	Davos, Switzerland	10 km Individual C	World Cup	2nd
150	2014–15	20 December 2014	Davos, Switzerland	10 km Individual F	World Cup	1st
151	2014–15	21 December 2014	Davos, Switzerland	1.3 km Sprint F	World Cup	1st
152	2014–15	3 January 2015	Oberstdorf, Germany	3 km Individual F	Stage World Cup	1st
153	2014–15	4 January 2015	Oberstdorf, Germany	10 km Pursuit C	Stage World Cup	1st
154	2014–15	6 January 2015	Val Müstair, Switzerland	1.4 km Sprint F	Stage World Cup	1st
155	2014–15	7 January 2015	Toblach, Italy	5 km Individual C	Stage World Cup	1st
156	2014–15	8 January 2015	Toblach, Italy	15 km Pursuit F	Stage World Cup	1st
157	2014–15	10 January 2015	Val di Fiemme, Italy	10 km Mass Start C	Stage World Cup	2nd
158	2014–15	11 January 2015	Val di Fiemme, Italy	9 km Pursuit F	Stage World Cup	3rd
159	2014–15	3–11 January 2015	(Germany) (Switzerland) (Italy) Tour de Ski	Overall Standings	World Cup	1st
160	2014–15	14 February 2015	Östersund, Sweden	1.2 km Sprint C	World Cup	1st
161	2014–15	15 February 2015	Östersund, Sweden	10 km Individual F	World Cup	2nd
162	2014–15	7 March 2015	Lahti, Finland	1.5 km Sprint F	World Cup	1st
163	2014–15	8 March 2015	Lahti, Finland	10 km Individual C	World Cup	1st
164	2014–15	11 March 2015	Drammen, Norway	1.3 km Sprint C	World Cup	3rd
165	2014–15	15 March 2015	Oslo, Norway	30 km Mass Start F	World Cup	1st
166	2016–17	27 November 2016	Rukatunturi, Finland	10 km Individual C	World Cup	1st
167	2016–17	3 December 2016	Lillehammer, Norway	5 km Individual F	Stage World Cup	3rd
168	2016–17	17 December 2016	La Clusaz, France	10 km Mass Start F	World Cup	2nd
169	2016–17	21 January 2017	Ulricehamn, Sweden	10 km Individual F	World Cup	1st
170	2016–17	29 January 2017	Falun, Sweden	15 km Mass Start C	World Cup	1st
171	2016–17	19 February 2017	Otepää, Estonia	10 km Individual C	World Cup	1st
172	2016–17	12 March 2017	Oslo, Norway	30 km Mass Start C	World Cup	1st
173	2016–17	18 March 2017	Quebec City, Canada	10 km Mass Start C	Stage World Cup	1st
174	2016–17	19 March 2017	Quebec City, Canada	10 km Pursuit F	Stage World Cup	1st
175	2016–17	17–19 March 2017	(Canada) World Cup Final	Overall Standings	World Cup	1st
176	2017–18	25 November 2017	Rukatunturi, Finland	10 km Individual C	Stage World Cup	1st
177	2017–18	24–26 November 2017	(Finland) Nordic Opening	Overall Standings	World Cup	2nd
178	2017–18	17 December 2017	Toblach, Italy	10 km Pursuit C	World Cup	1st
179	2017–18	4 March 2018	Lahti, Finland	10 km Individual C	World Cup	3rd
180	2017–18	11 March 2018	Oslo, Norway	30 km Mass Start F	World Cup	1st
181	2017–18	16 March 2018	Falun, Sweden	1.4 km Sprint F	Stage World Cup	3rd
182	2017–18	17 March 2018	Falun, Sweden	10 km Mass Start C	Stage World Cup	2nd
183	2017–18	18 March 2018	Falun, Sweden	10 km Pursuit F	Stage World Cup	3rd
184	2017–18	16–18 March 2018	(Sweden) World Cup Final	Overall Standings	World Cup	1st

==== Team podiums ====
- 30 victories – (20 RL, 10 TS)
- 37 podiums – (27 RL, 10 TS)

No.	Season	Date	Location	Race	Level	Place	Teammate(s)
1	2001–02	10 March 2002	Falun, Sweden	4 × 5 km Relay C/F	World Cup	2nd	Moen / Pedersen / Skofterud
2	2002–03	19 January 2003	Nové Město, Czech Republic	4 × 5 km Relay C/F	World Cup	2nd	Moen / Steira / Pedersen
3	2003–04	26 October 2003	Düsseldorf, Germany	6 × 0.8 km Team Sprint F	World Cup	1st	Pedersen
4	2003–04	23 November 2003	Beitostølen, Norway	4 × 5 km Relay C/F	World Cup	1st	Skofterud / Pedersen / Steira
5	2003–04	7 December 2003	Toblach, Italy	6 × 1.2 km Team Sprint F	World Cup	1st	Pedersen
6	2003–04	14 December 2003	Davos, Switzerland	4 × 5 km Relay C/F	World Cup	1st	Skofterud / Stemland / Pedersen
7	2003–04	11 January 2004	Otepää, Estonia	4 × 5 km Relay C/F	World Cup	1st	Skofterud / Pedersen / Steira
8	2003–04	15 February 2004	Oberstdorf, Germany	6 × 0.8 km Team Sprint F	World Cup	1st	Pedersen
9	2003–04	22 February 2004	Umeå, Sweden	4 × 5 km Relay C/F	World Cup	1st	Skofterud / Steira / Pedersen
10	2004–05	24 October 2004	Düsseldorf, Germany	6 × 0.8 km Team Sprint F	World Cup	1st	Pedersen
11	2004–05	24 November 2004	Gällivare, Sweden	4 × 5 km Relay C/F	World Cup	1st	Bjørnås / Skofterud / Pedersen
12	2004–05	5 December 2004	Bern, Switzerland	6 × 1.1 km Team Sprint F	World Cup	1st	Berg
13	2004–05	12 December 2004	Lago di Tesero, Italy	4 × 5 km Relay C/F	World Cup	3rd	Bjørnås / Skofterud / Pedersen
14	2004–05	15 December 2004	Asiago, Italy	6 × 1.2 km Team Sprint C	World Cup	1st	Berg
15	2004–05	20 March 2005	Falun, Sweden	4 × 5 km Relay C/F	World Cup	2nd	Bjørnås / Pedersen / Stemland
16	2005–06	23 October 2005	Düsseldorf, Germany	6 × 0.8 km Team Sprint F	World Cup	1st	Pedersen
17	2005–06	20 November 2005	Beitostølen, Norway	4 × 5 km Relay C/F	World Cup	1st	Berg / Skofterud / Pedersen
18	2005–06	15 January 2006	Val di Fiemme, Italy	4 × 5 km Relay C/F	World Cup	3rd	Skofterud / Stemland / Steira
19	2006–07	29 October 2006	Düsseldorf, Germany	6 × 0.8 km Team Sprint F	World Cup	1st	Berg
20	2006–07	19 November 2006	Gällivare, Sweden	4 × 5 km Relay C/F	World Cup	1st	Skofterud / Pedersen / Steira
21	2006–07	4 February 2007	Davos, Switzerland	4 × 5 km Relay C/F	World Cup	2nd	Jacobsen / Skofterud / Steira
22	2007–08	25 November 2007	Beitostølen, Norway	4 × 5 km Relay C/F	World Cup	1st	Jacobsen / Johaug / Skofterud
23	2007–08	17 February 2008	Liberec, Czech Republic	4 × 1.4 km Team Sprint C	World Cup	1st	Jacobsen
24	2007–08	24 February 2008	Falun, Sweden	4 × 5 km Relay C/F	World Cup	1st	Tyldum / Jacobsen / Steira
25	2008–09	23 November 2008	Gällivare, Sweden	4 × 5 km Relay C/F	World Cup	1st	Johaug / Steira / Kristoffersen
26	2009–10	22 November 2009	Beitostølen, Norway	4 × 5 km Relay C/F	World Cup	2nd	Skofterud / Johaug / Steira
27	2009–10	7 March 2010	Lahti, Finland	4 × 5 km Relay C/F	World Cup	1st	Kristoffersen / Johaug / Steira
28	2010–11	21 November 2010	Gällivare, Sweden	4 × 5 km Relay C/F	World Cup	1st	Skofterud / Johaug / Steira
29	2010–11	19 December 2010	La Clusaz, France	4 × 5 km Relay C/F	World Cup	1st	Skofterud / Johaug / Steira
30	2010–11	16 January 2011	Liberec, Czech Republic	6 × 1.3 km Team Sprint C	World Cup	1st	Falla
31	2011–12	20 November 2011	Sjusjøen, Norway	4 × 5 km Relay C/F	World Cup	1st	Skofterud / Johaug / Steira
32	2011–12	12 February 2012	Nové Město, Czech Republic	4 × 5 km Relay C/F	World Cup	1st	Skofterud / Johaug / Jacobsen
33	2012–13	25 November 2012	Gällivare, Sweden	4 × 5 km Relay C/F	World Cup	1st	Skofterud / Johaug / Hagen
34	2012–13	20 January 2013	La Clusaz, France	4 × 5 km Relay C/F	World Cup	1st	Weng / Johaug / Steira
35	2013–14	8 December 2013	Lillehammer, Norway	4 × 5 km Relay C/F	World Cup	1st	Weng / Johaug / Steira
36	2016–17	18 December 2016	La Clusaz, France	4 × 5 km Relay C/F	World Cup	1st	Østberg / Haga / Weng
37	2016–17	22 January 2017	Ulricehamn, Sweden	4 × 5 km Relay C/F	World Cup	1st	Østberg / Weng / Jacobsen

== Personal life ==
Bjørgen lives with her partner Fred Børre Lundberg, a former Olympic champion in Nordic combined, in Holmenkollen, Oslo. In 2015, Bjørgen announced that she was pregnant and would not compete in the coming season, aiming for a return in the 2017 season. Her first son was born on 26 December 2015. After having retired at the end of the 2018 season she gave birth to a second son in March 2019.
