= Valentyna Shevchenko (cross-country skier) =

Ukrainian cross-country skier (born 1975)

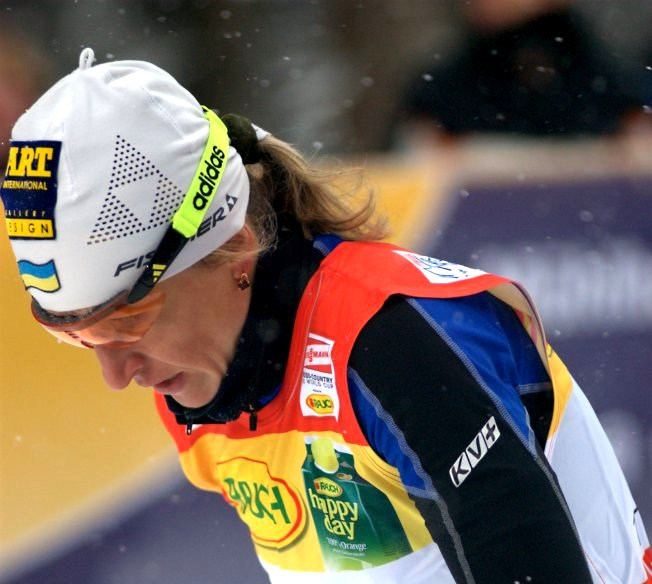
- Valentyna Shevchenko in 2010

Personal information
- Full name: Valentyna Yevhenivna Shevchenko
- Nationality: Ukraine
- Born: 2 October 1975 (age 50) Nosivka Raion, Ukrainian SSR, Soviet Union

Sport
- Sport: Skiing

World Cup career
- Seasons: 1994–2000, 2002–2017
- Indiv. starts: 276
- Indiv. podiums: 18
- Indiv. wins: 5
- Team starts: 36
- Team podiums: 0
- Overall titles: 0 – (3rd in 2004)
- Discipline titles: 1 – (DI, 2004)
Medal record
Representing Ukraine
Women's cross-country skiing
World Championships
Bronze medal – third place	2009 Liberec	30 km freestyle
Winter Universiade
Gold medal – first place	1999 Poprad	5 km
Gold medal – first place	1999 Poprad	10 km pursuit
Gold medal – first place	1999 Poprad	15 km mass start
Gold medal – first place	2003 Tarvisio	15 km individual
Bronze medal – third place	1995 Jaca	Relay
Bronze medal – third place	1999 Poprad	Relay

Valentyna Yevhenivna Shevchenko (Ukrainian: Валентина Євгенівна Шевченко) (born 2 October 1975 in Nosivka Raion) is a Ukrainian former cross-country skier who competed in the World Cup between the 1993–94 season and the 2016–17 season.

== Career ==
She won the bronze medal in the 30 km event at the FIS Nordic World Ski Championships 2009 in Liberec.

Competing in four Winter Olympics, Shevchenko earned her best finish finished fifth in the 30 km at Salt Lake City in 2002.

She won the 30 km event at the Holmenkollen ski festival in 2008, as well as La Sgambeda on 19 December 2010 in Livigno, Italy.

Shevchenko carried the Ukrainian flag at the opening ceremony of the 2014 Winter Olympics.

== Cross-country skiing results ==
All results are sourced from the International Ski Federation (FIS).

=== Olympic Games ===
Year	Age	5 km	10 km	15 km	Pursuit	30 km	Sprint	4 × 5 km relay	Team sprint
1998	22	19	—N/a	11	20	14	—N/a	9	—N/a
2002	26	—N/a	12	21	21	5	—	DNS	—N/a
2006	30	—N/a	21	—N/a	14	7	—	8	—
2010	34	—N/a	9	—N/a	14	DNF	—	13	—
2014	38	—N/a	22	—N/a	26	14	—	11	—

=== World Championships ===
- 1 medal – (1 bronze)

Year	Age	5 km	10 km	15 km	Pursuit	30 km	Sprint	4 × 5 km relay	Team sprint
1995	19	63	—N/a	—	54	—	—N/a	—	—N/a
1997	21	38	—N/a	31	26	15	—N/a	10	—N/a
1999	23	6	—N/a	12	15	11	—N/a	6	—N/a
2003	27	—N/a	6	20	9	20	—	—	—N/a
2005	29	—N/a	14	—N/a	14	DNF	—	DSQ	—
2007	31	—N/a	8	—N/a	14	12	—	12	—
2009	33	—N/a	5	—N/a	5	Bronze	—	11	—
2011	35	—N/a	16	—N/a	17	14	—	12	—
2013	37	—N/a	22	—N/a	21	12	—	10	—
2015	39	—N/a	—	—N/a	28	33	—	11	—
2017	41	—N/a	44	—N/a	42	DNF	—	16	—

=== World Cup ===
==== Season titles ====
- 1 title – (1 distance)

Season
Season	Discipline
2004	Distance

==== Season standings ====
Season	Age	Discipline standings					Ski Tour standings			
Season	Age	Overall	Distance	Long Distance	Middle Distance	Sprint	Nordic Opening	Tour de Ski	World Cup Final	Ski Tour Canada
1994	18	NC	—N/a	—N/a	—N/a	—N/a	—N/a	—N/a	—N/a	—N/a
1995	19	NC	—N/a	—N/a	—N/a	—N/a	—N/a	—N/a	—N/a	—N/a
1996	20	66	—N/a	—N/a	—N/a	—N/a	—N/a	—N/a	—N/a	—N/a
1997	21	41	—N/a	25	—N/a	—	—N/a	—N/a	—N/a	—N/a
1998	22	27	—N/a	16	—N/a	37	—N/a	—N/a	—N/a	—N/a
1999	23	18	—N/a	14	—N/a	36	—N/a	—N/a	—N/a	—N/a
2000	24	17	—N/a	11	16	64	—N/a	—N/a	—N/a	—N/a
2002	26	19	—N/a	—N/a	—N/a	NC	—N/a	—N/a	—N/a	—N/a
2003	27	13	—N/a	—N/a	—N/a	55	—N/a	—N/a	—N/a	—N/a
2004	28	3rd place, bronze medalist(s)	1st place, gold medalist(s)	—N/a	—N/a	—	—N/a	—N/a	—N/a	—N/a
2005	29	19	12	—N/a	—N/a	—	—N/a	—N/a	—N/a	—N/a
2006	30	14	8	—N/a	—N/a	—	—N/a	—N/a	—N/a	—N/a
2007	31	7	9	—N/a	—N/a	71	—N/a	3rd place, bronze medalist(s)	—N/a	—N/a
2008	32	6	2nd place, silver medalist(s)	—N/a	—N/a	38	—N/a	4	4	—N/a
2009	33	15	10	—N/a	—N/a	85	—N/a	14	—	—N/a
2010	34	24	16	—N/a	—N/a	69	—N/a	19	18	—N/a
2011	35	19	16	—N/a	—N/a	NC	18	16	15	—N/a
2012	36	30	21	—N/a	—N/a	NC	29	14	21	—N/a
2013	37	28	22	—N/a	—N/a	NC	26	16	30	—N/a
2014	38	45	36	—N/a	—N/a	NC	49	14	32	—N/a
2015	39	NC	NC	—N/a	—N/a	—	—	—	—N/a	—N/a
2016	40	NC	NC	—N/a	—N/a	—	—	—	—N/a	—
2017	41	NC	NC	—N/a	—N/a	NC	—	—	—	—N/a

==== Individual podiums ====
- 5 victories – (4 WC, 1 SWC)
- 18 podiums – (14 WC, 4 SWC)

No.	Season	Date	Location	Race	Level	Place
1	2003–04'	23 November 2003	Beitostølen, Norway	10 km Individual F	World Cup	2nd
2	2003–04'	28 November 2003	Rukatunturi, Finland	10 km Individual C	World Cup	1st
3	2003–04'	6 December 2003	Toblach, Italy	15 km Mass Start F	World Cup	2nd
4	2003–04'	13 December 2003	Davos, Switzerland	10 km Individual C	World Cup	1st
5	2003–04'	20 December 2003	Ramsau, Austria	10 km Individual F	World Cup	3rd
6	2003–04'	21 December 2003	Ramsau, Austria	7.5 km + 7.5 km Skiathlon C/F	World Cup	2nd
7	2003–04'	25 January 2004	Marcialonga, Italy	70 km Mass Start C	World Cup	2nd
8	2003–04'	28 February 2004	Oslo, Norway	30 km Individual F	World Cup	3rd
9	2005–06	31 December 2005	Nové Město, Czech Republic	10 km Individual F	World Cup	3rd
10	2006–07	2 January 2007	Oberstdorf, Germany	5 km + 5 km Skiathlon C/F	Stage World Cup	2nd
11	2006–07	7 January 2007	Cavalese, Italy	10 km Individual F	Stage World Cup	3rd
12	2006–07	31 December 2006 – 7 January 2007	(Germany) (Italy) Tour de Ski	Overall Standings	World Cup	3rd
13	2006–07	27 January 2007	Otepää, Estonia	10 km Individual C	World Cup	3rd
14	2007–08	6 January 2008	Val di Fiemme, Italy	9 km Pursuit F	Stage World Cup	1st
15	2007–08	25 January 2008	Canmore, Canada	10 km Individual F	World Cup	1st
16	2007–08	2 March 2008	Lahti, Finland	10 km Individual C	World Cup	2nd
17	2007–08	8 March 2008	Oslo, Norway	30 km Individual F	World Cup	1st
18	2008–09	4 January 2009	Val di Fiemme, Italy	9 km Pursuit F	World Cup	2nd

Olympic Games
Preceded by Liliya Ludan	Flagbearer for Ukraine; Sochi 2014	Succeeded by Olena Pidhrushna
