= Anna Jönsson Haag =

Swedish cross-country skier

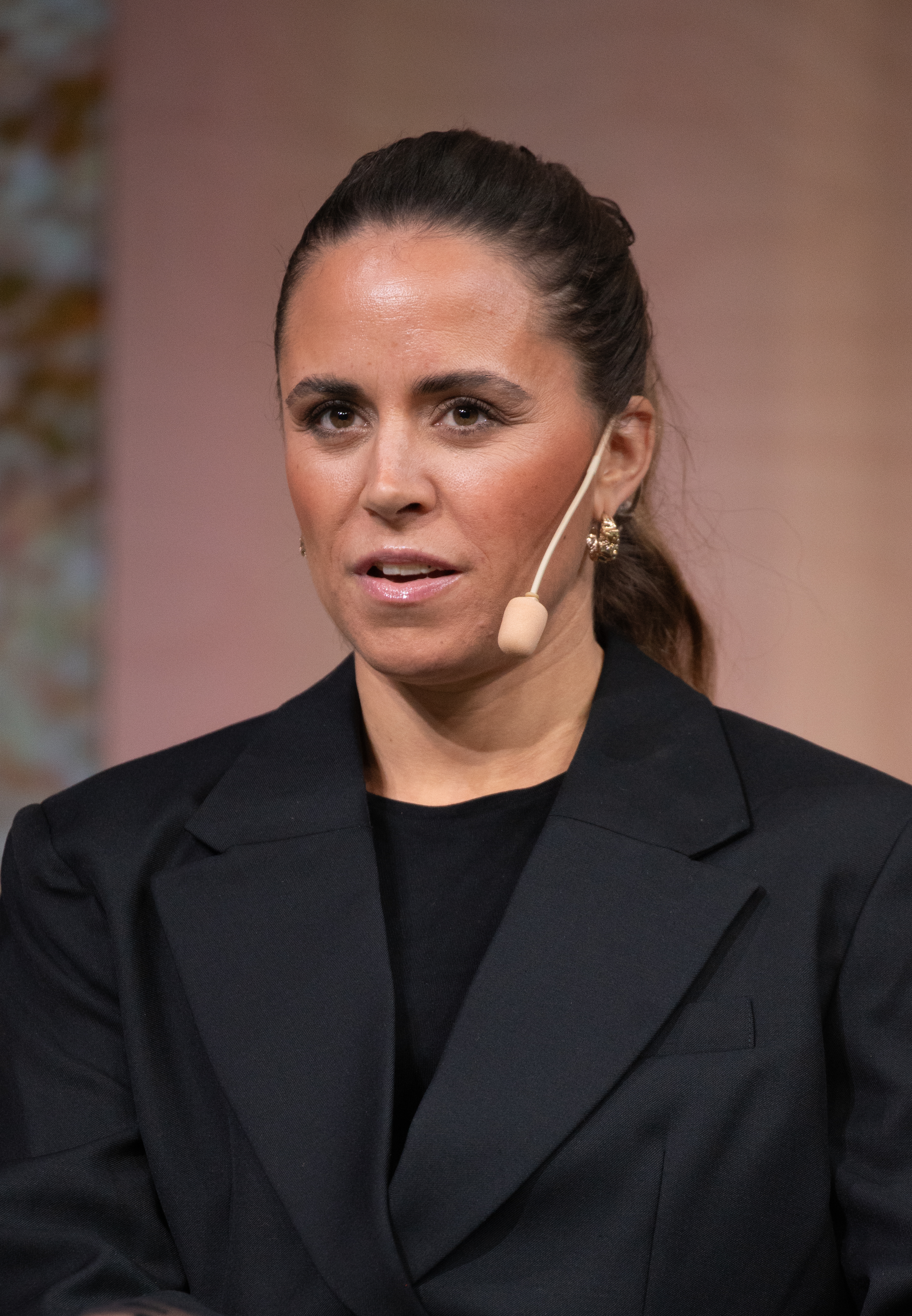
- Haag at 2024 Nobel Week

Personal information
- Full name: Anna Margret Jönsson Haag
- Nationality: Sweden
- Born: Anna Hansson; 1 June 1986 (age 40) Köping, Sweden
- Height: 1.63 m (5 ft 4 in)
- Spouse: Emil Jönsson (m. 2018)

Sport
- Sport: Skiing
- Club: Anna & Emil Sportklubb

World Cup career
- Seasons: 12 – (2007–2018)
- Indiv. starts: 175
- Indiv. podiums: 3
- Indiv. wins: 1
- Team starts: 14
- Team podiums: 5
- Team wins: 1
- Overall titles: 0 – (11th in 2011)
- Discipline titles: 0
Medal record
Women's cross-country skiing
Representing Sweden
International nordic ski competitions
Event	1st	2nd	3rd
Olympic Games	1	3	0
World Championships	0	3	1
Total	1	6	1
Olympic Games
Gold medal – first place	2014 Sochi	4 × 5 km relay
Silver medal – second place	2010 Vancouver	15 km pursuit
Silver medal – second place	2010 Vancouver	Team sprint
Silver medal – second place	2018 Pyeongchang	4 × 5 km relay
World Championships
Silver medal – second place	2011 Oslo	4 × 5 km relay
Silver medal – second place	2013 Val di Fiemme	4 × 5 km relay
Silver medal – second place	2017 Lahti	4 × 5 km relay
Bronze medal – third place	2009 Liberec	4 × 5 km relay
Junior World Championships
Silver medal – second place	2006 Kranj	4 × 3.33 km relay

Anna Margret Jönsson Haag (born 1 June 1986 as Anna Hansson) is a Swedish retired cross-country skier who competed between 2003 and 2018. At the Sochi 2014 Winter Olympics Haag won gold in the 4 × 5 km relay, earning Sweden the first gold medal in the women's relay event since 1960.

== Career ==
Haag participated in her first FIS Nordic World Ski Championships 2009 in Liberec. She won a bronze medal in the 4 × 5 km relay event together with Lina Andersson, Britta Norgren and Charlotte Kalla.

Haag's best individual World Cup finish is a third place in a 10 km event 21 November 2009. Her lone victory was at a FIS race in Sweden in the 10 km event in 2008.

On 19 February 2010, Haag won the Olympic silver medal in the 15 km pursuit. Three days later, on 22 February, she won another silver medal, in the team sprint together with Charlotte Kalla.

At the Sochi 2014 Winter Olympics Haag in the 4 × 5 km relay, 3rd stage, won gold.

At the Pyeongchang 2018 Winter Olympics Haag won silver in the 4 × 5 km relay.

In March 2018, her retirement from cross–country skiing following the 2017–2018 season was announced.

== Cross-country skiing results ==
All results are sourced from the International Ski Federation (FIS).

=== Olympic Games ===
- 4 medals – (1 gold, 3 silver)

Year	Age	10 km individual	15 km skiathlon	30 km mass start	Sprint	4 × 5 km relay	Team sprint
2010	23	4	Silver	—	—	—	Silver
2014	27	20	—	11	—	Gold	—
2018	31	—	32	29	—	Silver	—

=== World Championships ===
- 4 medals – (3 silver, 1 bronze)

Year	Age	10 km individual	15 km skiathlon	30 km mass start	Sprint	4 × 5 km relay	Team sprint
2009	22	—	—	25	—	Bronze	—
2011	24	14	10	10	—	Silver	—
2013	26	17	15	6	—	Silver	—
2015	28	—	—	14	—	—	—
2017	30	5	18	9	—	Silver	—

=== World Cup ===
==== Season standings ====
Season	Age	Discipline standings			Ski Tour standings			
Season	Age	Overall	Distance	Sprint	Nordic Opening	Tour de Ski	World Cup Final	Ski Tour Canada
2007	21	NC	NC	—	—N/a	—	—N/a	—N/a
2008	22	19	17	50	—N/a	13	—	—N/a
2009	23	19	19	43	—N/a	7	34	—N/a
2010	24	14	11	44	—N/a	—	15	—N/a
2011	25	11	8	38	11	DNF	7	—N/a
2012	26	23	18	61	8	DNF	13	—N/a
2013	27	31	25	67	—	18	17	—N/a
2014	28	67	39	NC	—	DNF	—	—N/a
2015	29	40	23	76	25	DNF	—N/a	—N/a
2016	30	30	27	53	—	21	—N/a	25
2017	31	26	19	NC	13	—	13	—N/a
2018	32	24	20	52	17	12	41	—N/a

==== Individual podiums ====
- 1 victory – (1 SWC)
- 3 podiums – (2 WC, 1 SWC)

No.	Season	Date	Location	Race	Level	Place
1	2009–10	21 November 2009	Beitostølen, Norway	10 km Individual F	World Cup	3rd
2	2009–10	12 December 2009	Rogla, Slovenia	15 km Mass Start C	World Cup	3rd
3	2010–11	3 January 2011	Oberstdorf, Germany	5 km + 5 km Pursuit C/F	World Cup	1st

==== Team podiums ====
- 1 victory – (1 RL)
- 5 podiums – (5 RL)

No.	Season	Date	Location	Race	Level	Place	Teammates
1	2008–09	23 November 2008	Gällivare, Sweden	4 × 5 km Relay C/F	World Cup	3rd	Hansson / Johansson Norgren / Kalla
2	2008–09	7 December 2008	La Clusaz, France	4 × 5 km Relay C/F	World Cup	2nd	Andersson / Lindborg / Kalla
3	2009–10	22 November 2009	Beitostølen, Norway	4 × 5 km Relay C/F	World Cup	1st	Olsson / Lindborg / Kalla
4	2010–11	21 November 2010	Gällivare, Sweden	4 × 5 km Relay C/F	World Cup	2nd	Johansson Norgren / Rydqvist / Kalla
5	2010–11	19 December 2010	La Clusaz, France	4 × 5 km Relay C/F	World Cup	3rd	Lindborg / Rydqvist / Kalla

== Personal life ==
Haag married fellow Swedish sprint specialist Emil Jönsson in 2018. They spend their time between Östersund, Sweden and Davos, Switzerland.
