= FIS Nordic World Ski Championships 2009 – Women's 30 kilometre freestyle =

Women's 30 kilometre freestyle at the FIS Nordic World Ski Championships 2009
- Venue: Liberec
- Date: 28 February 2009
- Competitors: 69 from 25 nations
- Winning time: 1:16:10.6

Medalists
gold medal	Justyna Kowalczyk	Poland
silver medal	Yevgeniya Medvedeva	Russia
bronze medal	Valentyna Shevchenko	Ukraine

The Women's 30 kilometre freestyle at the FIS Nordic World Ski Championships 2009 was held on 28 February 2009 at 13:00 CET.

== Results ==
Rank	Bib	Athlete	Country	Time	Deficit
1st place, gold medalist(s)	2	Justyna Kowalczyk	Poland	1:16:10.6	—
2nd place, silver medalist(s)	14	Yevgeniya Medvedeva	Russia	1:16:19.4	+8.8
3rd place, bronze medalist(s)	7	Valentyna Shevchenko	Ukraine	1:16:19.9	+9.3
4	8	Therese Johaug	Norway	1:16:20.5	+9.9
5	5	Kristin Størmer Steira	Norway	1:16:21.9	+11.3
6	10	Riitta-Liisa Roponen	Finland	1:16:22.8	+12.2
7	1	Aino-Kaisa Saarinen	Finland	1:16:27.1	+16.5
8	6	Arianna Follis	Italy	1:16:41.7	+31.1
9	3	Marianna Longa	Italy	1:16:57.5	+46.9
10	9	Pirjo Muranen	Finland	1:17:24.1	+1:13.5
11	17	Karine Laurent Philippot	France	1:17:49.7	+1:39.1
12	22	Marthe Kristoffersen	Norway	1:17:52.4	+1:41.8
13	27	Olga Zavyalova	Russia	1:18:09.0	+1:58.4
14	26	Coraline Hugue	France	1:18:34.1	+2:23.5
15	20	Antonella Confortola Wyatt	Italy	1:18:38.1	+2:27.5
16	41	Oxana Yatskaya	Kazakhstan	1:18:47.8	+2:37.2
17	35	Elizabeth Stephen	United States	1:18:53.4	+2:42.8
18	13	Charlotte Kalla	Sweden	1:18:57.0	+2:46.4
19	18	Sabina Valbusa	Italy	1:19:01.6	+2:51.0
20	36	Kornelia Marek	Poland	1:19:13.6	+3:03.0
21	42	Morgan Arritola	United States	1:19:22.8	+3:12.2
22	15	Claudia Nystad	Germany	1:19:29.7	+3:19.1
23	32	Alena Sannikova	Belarus	1:19:35.3	+3:24.7
24	28	Riikka Sarasoja	Finland	1:19:51.4	+3:40.8
25	11	Anna Haag	Sweden	1:19:52.6	+3:42.0
26	62	Hongxue Li	China	1:19:53.6	+3:43.0
27	33	Célia Bourgeois	France	1:19:54.5	+3:43.9
28	29	Laura Orgué	Spain	1:20:06.7	+3:56.1
29	31	Svetlana Malahova-Shishkina	Kazakhstan	1:20:12.2	+4:01.6
30	30	Maryna Antsybor	Ukraine	1:20:26.8	+4:16.2
31	61	Ekaterina Rudakova	Belarus	1:21:12.4	+5:01.8
32	21	Tatyana Zhambaeva	Russia	1:21:27.7	+5:17.1
33	48	Vita Yakymchuk	Ukraine	1:21:32.0	+5:21.4
34	38	Tatjana Mannima	Estonia	1:21:33.2	+5:22.6
35	53	Elena Kolomina	Kazakhstan	1:21:34.7	+5:24.1
36	23	Ingvild Flugstad Østberg	Norway	1:22:35.9	+6:25.3
37	63	Li Xin	China	1:22:59.2	+6:48.6
38	43	Helena Erbenová	Czech Republic	1:23:08.1	+6:57.5
39	54	Shayla Swanson	Canada	1:23:36.0	+7:25.4
40	57	Nastassia Dubarezava	Belarus	1:24:18.8	+8:08.2
41	52	Maja Benedičič	Slovenia	1:24:39.7	+8:29.1
42	46	Katherine Calder	New Zealand	1:25:19.7	+9:09.1
43	44	Barbara Jezeršek	Slovenia	1:25:31.3	+9:20.7
44	39	Kateryna Grygorenko	Ukraine	1:25:51.6	+9:41.0
45	50	Klára Moravcová	Czech Republic	1:26:12.7	+10:02.1
46	64	Yingcui E	China	1:26:24.5	+10:13.9
47	49	Caitlin Compton	United States	1:26:56.2	+10:45.6
48	45	Hanna Brodin	Sweden	1:27:25.1	+11:14.5
49	59	Paulina Maciuszek	Poland	1:27:26.2	+11:15.6
50	37	Irina Terentjeva	Lithuania	1:29:15.2	+13:04.6
51	51	Dina Ussina	Kazakhstan	1:29:52.3	+13:41.7
52	60	Aimee Watson	Australia	1:30:05.9	+13:55.3
53	56	Antonia Grigorova-Burgova	Bulgaria	1:31:06.9	+14:56.3
54	67	Jaqueline Mourão	Brazil	1:34:12.0	+18:01.4
55	66	Olga Reshetkova	Kyrgyzstan	1:35:51.3	+19:40.7
56	69	Julia Zamyatina	Kyrgyzstan	LAP	
57	68	Mirlene Picin	Brazil	LAP	
—	24	Yuliya Chepalova	Russia	DSQ	
—	4	Virpi Kuitunen	Finland	DNF	
—	19	Britta Johansson Norgren	Sweden	DNF	
—	34	Cécile Storti	France	DNF	
—	55	Kelime Çetinkaya	Turkey	DNF	
—	58	Daria Gaiazova	Canada	DNF	
—	12	Sara Renner	Canada	DNS	
—	16	Evi Sachenbacher-Stehle	Germany	DNS	
—	25	Sylwia Jaśkowiec	Poland	DNS	
—	40	Ivana Janečková	Czech Republic	DNS	
—	47	Olga Vasiljonok	Belarus	DNS	
—	65	Andrea Fancy	New Zealand	DNS	
