= Cross-country skiing at the 2010 Winter Olympics – Women's 10 kilometre freestyle =

Women's 10 kilometre freestyle at the XXI Olympic Winter Games
- Venue: Whistler Olympic Park
- Dates: 15 February 2010
- Competitors: 78 from 36 nations
- Winning time: 24:58.4

Medalists
| 1st place, gold medalist(s) | | Charlotte Kalla | Sweden |
| 2nd place, silver medalist(s) | | Kristina Šmigun-Vähi | Estonia |
| 3rd place, bronze medalist(s) | | Marit Bjørgen | Norway |

The women's 10 kilometre freestyle cross-country skiing competition at the 2010 Winter Olympics in Vancouver, Canada was held on February 15 at Whistler Olympic Park in Whistler, British Columbia at 10:00 PST.

Each skier starts at 30-second intervals, skiing the entire 10 kilometre course. Estonia's Kristina Šmigun-Vähi was the defending Olympic champion in this event though it was held in the classical style. Aino-Kaisa Saarinen on Finland was the defending world champion though that event was also held in the classical style. The final World Cup event in women's 10 km freestyle prior to the 2010 Games took place on February 5 at Canmore, Alberta and was won by Sweden's Charlotte Kalla.

Šmigun-Vähi won silver in this event, Saarinen would finish 15th, and Kalla would win gold. Kalla is the Sweden's first female individual gold medalist in cross-country skiing since Toini Gustafsson's 5 km win at Grenoble in 1968.

== Results ==
| Rank | Bib | Name | Country | Time | Deficit |
|---|---|---|---|---|---|
| 1st place, gold medalist(s) | 31 | Charlotte Kalla | Sweden | 24:58.4 | 0.00 |
| 2nd place, silver medalist(s) | 17 | Kristina Šmigun-Vähi | Estonia | 25:05.0 | +6.6 |
| 3rd place, bronze medalist(s) | 28 | Marit Bjørgen | Norway | 25:14.3 | +15.9 |
| 4 | 23 | Anna Haag | Sweden | 25:19.3 | +20.9 |
| 5 | 33 | Justyna Kowalczyk | Poland | 25:20.1 | +21.7 |
| 6 | 26 | Riitta-Liisa Roponen | Finland | 25:24.3 | +25.9 |
| 7 | 22 | Yevgeniya Medvedeva | Russia | 25:26.5 | +28.1 |
| 8 | 30 | Kristin Størmer Steira | Norway | 25:50.5 | +52.1 |
| 9 | 21 | Valentyna Shevchenko | Ukraine | 25:51.1 | +52.7 |
| 10 | 16 | Svetlana Malahova-Shishkina | Kazakhstan | 25:53.9 | +55.5 |
| 11 | 27 | Arianna Follis | Italy | 25:54.1 | +55.7 |
| 12 | 18 | Evi Sachenbacher-Stehle | Germany | 25:57.7 | +59.3 |
| 12 | 19 | Olga Zavyalova | Russia | 25:57.7 | +59.3 |
| 14 | 34 | Silvia Rupil | Italy | 25:58.5 | +1:00.1 |
| 15 | 32 | Aino-Kaisa Saarinen | Finland | 25:59.5 | +1:01.1 |
| 16 | 14 | Claudia Nystad | Germany | 25:59.8 | +1:01.4 |
| 17 | 12 | Sabina Valbusa | Italy | 26:05.8 | +1:07.4 |
| 18 | 25 | Marianna Longa | Italy | 26:06.2 | +1:07.8 |
| 19 | 20 | Natalya Korostelyova | Russia | 26:07.0 | +1:08.6 |
| 20 | 29 | Irina Khazova | Russia | 26:08.7 | +1:10.3 |
| 21 | 44 | Miriam Gössner | Germany | 26:14.8 | +1:16.4 |
| 22 | 24 | Vibeke Skofterud | Norway | 26:16.3 | +1:17.9 |
| 23 | 7 | Stefanie Böhler | Germany | 26:19.2 | +1:20.8 |
| 24 | 8 | Anna Olsson | Sweden | 26:23.1 | +1:24.7 |
| 25 | 10 | Kamila Rajdlová | Czech Republic | 26:26.2 | +1:27.8 |
| 26 | 9 | Karine Laurent Philippot | France | 26:27.9 | +1:29.5 |
| 27 | 11 | Elena Kolomina | Kazakhstan | 26:35.6 | +1:37.2 |
| 28 | 47 | Sylwia Jaskowiec | Poland | 26:37.2 | +1:38.8 |
| 29 | 6 | Britta Johansson Norgren | Sweden | 26:48.1 | +1:49.7 |
| 30 | 55 | Caitlin Compton | United States | 26:49.1 | +1:50.7 |
| 31 | 13 | Riikka Sarasoja | Finland | 26:50.2 | +1:51.8 |
| 32 | 3 | Ivana Janečková | Czech Republic | 26:51.3 | +1:52.9 |
| 33 | 46 | Vesna Fabjan | Slovenia | 26:51.6 | +1:53.2 |
| 34 | 41 | Morgan Arritola | United States | 27:04.4 | +2:06.0 |
| 35 | 2 | Li Hongxue | China | 27:05.7 | +2:07.3 |
| 36 | 42 | Tatyana Roshchina | Kazakhstan | 27:06.6 | +2:08.2 |
| 37 | 53 | Maryna Antsybor | Ukraine | 27:07.4 | +2:09.0 |
| 38 | 1 | Laura Orgue | Spain | 27:09.4 | +2:11.0 |
| 39 | 51 | Kornelia Marek | Poland | 27:12.6 | +2:14.2 |
| 40 | 37 | Oxana Yatskaya | Kazakhstan | 27:16.3 | +2:17.9 |
| 41 | 57 | Barbara Jezeršek | Slovenia | 27:17.3 | +2:18.9 |
| 42 | 50 | Holly Brooks | United States | 27:17.6 | +2:19.2 |
| 43 | 54 | Monika Gyorgy | Romania | 27:19.5 | +2:21.1 |
| 44 | 5 | Alena Sannikova | Belarus | 27:21.3 | +2:22.9 |
| 45 | 61 | Paulina Maciuszek | Poland | 27:22.1 | +2:23.7 |
| 46 | 48 | Kateryna Grygorenko | Ukraine | 27:29.7 | +2:31.3 |
| 47 | 36 | Aurore Cuinet | France | 27:30.2 | +2:31.8 |
| 48 | 40 | Celia Bourgeois | France | 27:31.4 | +2:33.0 |
| 49 | 15 | Marthe Kristoffersen | Norway | 27:38.4 | +2:40.0 |
| 50 | 39 | Liz Stephen | United States | 27:41.1 | +2:42.7 |
| 51 | 52 | Madeleine Williams | Canada | 27:43.6 | +2:45.2 |
| 52 | 58 | Nobuko Fukuda | Japan | 27:47.7 | +2:49.3 |
| 53 | 4 | Krista Lähteenmäki | Finland | 27:49.4 | +2:51.0 |
| 54 | 65 | Lee Chae-Won | South Korea | 27:56.0 | +2:57.6 |
| 55 | 38 | Eva Nývltová | Czech Republic | 28:04.1 | +3:05.7 |
| 56 | 35 | Olga Vasiljonok | Belarus | 28:06.2 | +3:07.8 |
| 57 | 56 | Lada Nesterenko | Ukraine | 28:06.4 | +3:08.0 |
| 58 | 49 | Tatjana Mannima | Estonia | 28:13.0 | +3:14.6 |
| 59 | 43 | Ekaterina Rudakova | Belarus | 28:16.1 | +3:17.7 |
| 60 | 64 | Antonia Grigorova | Bulgaria | 28:27.7 | +3:29.3 |
| 61 | 60 | Michiko Kashiwabara | Japan | 28:32.0 | +3:33.6 |
| 62 | 45 | Laure Barthélémy | France | 28:43.9 | +3:45.5 |
| 63 | 62 | Katherine Calder | New Zealand | 28:50.9 | +3:52.5 |
| 64 | 59 | Irina Terentjeva | Lithuania | 28:52.2 | +3:53.8 |
| 65 | 63 | Li Xin | China | 29:38.5 | +4:40.1 |
| 66 | 69 | Teodora Malcheva | Bulgaria | 29:52.4 | +4:54.0 |
| 67 | 67 | Jaqueline Mourão | Brazil | 30:22.2 | +5:23.8 |
| 68 | 68 | Fiona Hughes | Great Britain | 30:29.8 | +5:31.4 |
| 69 | 66 | Kelime Çetinkaya | Turkey | 30:48.0 | +5:49.6 |
| 70 | 72 | Anete Brice | Latvia | 30:51.8 | +5:53.4 |
| 71 | 77 | Alexandra Camenscic | Moldova | 31:01.0 | +6:02.6 |
| 72 | 71 | Tanja Karisik | Bosnia and Herzegovina | 31:30.4 | +6:32.0 |
| 73 | 73 | Maria Danou | Greece | 32:14.6 | +7:16.2 |
| 74 | 74 | Erdene-Ochir Ochirsuren | Mongolia | 32:56.1 | +7:57.7 |
| 75 | 75 | Vera Viczián | Hungary | 33:45.8 | +8:47.4 |
| 76 | 78 | Kristine Khachatryan | Armenia | 34:17.5 | +9:19.1 |
| 77 | 70 | Rosana Kiroska | Macedonia | 34:45.8 | +9:47.4 |
| 78 | 76 | Belma Šmrković | Serbia | 35:47.4 | +10:49.0 |
