= FIS Nordic World Ski Championships 2009 – Women's 15 kilometre pursuit =

Women's 15 kilometre pursuit at the FIS Nordic World Ski Championships 2009
- Venue: Liberec
- Date: 21 February 2009
- Competitors: 77 from 30 nations
- Winning time: 40:55.3

Medalists
gold medal	Justyna Kowalczyk	Poland
silver medal	Kristin Størmer Steira	Norway
bronze medal	Aino-Kaisa Saarinen	Finland

The Women's 15 kilometre pursuit at the FIS Nordic World Ski Championships 2009 was held on 21 February 2009 at 13:00 CET.

== Results ==
Rank	Bib	Athlete	Country	Time	Deficit
1st place, gold medalist(s)	2	Justyna Kowalczyk	Poland	40:55.3	—
2nd place, silver medalist(s)	6	Kristin Størmer Steira	Norway	40:57.0	+1.7
3rd place, bronze medalist(s)	1	Aino-Kaisa Saarinen	Finland	41:03.3	+8.0
4	3	Marianna Longa	Italy	41:16.8	+21.5
5	9	Valentyna Shevchenko	Ukraine	41:39.5	+44.2
6	10	Therese Johaug	Norway	42:19.2	+1:23.9
7	8	Arianna Follis	Italy	42:25.3	+1:30.0
8	14	Charlotte Kalla	Sweden	42:25.9	+1:30.6
9	7	Petra Majdič	Slovenia	42:30.6	+1:35.3
10	19	Evi Sachenbacher-Stehle	Germany	42:34.4	+1:39.1
11	44	Oxana Yatskaya	Kazakhstan	42:34.5	+1:39.2
12	15	Yevgeniya Medvedeva	Russia	42:46.6	+1:51.3
13	4	Virpi Kuitunen	Finland	42:49.2	+1:53.9
14	22	Masako Ishida	Japan	42:51.4	+1:56.1
15	38	Elizabeth Stephen	United States	42:52.3	+1:57.0
16	24	Antonella Confortola Wyatt	Italy	42:53.5	+1:58.2
17	18	Katrin Zeller	Germany	42:59.7	+2:04.4
18	20	Karine Laurent Philippot	France	43:05.4	+2:10.1
19	5	Marit Bjørgen	Norway	43:12.4	+2:17.1
20	37	Kamila Rajdlová	Czech Republic	43:18.7	+2:23.4
21	13	Sara Renner	Canada	43:22.9	+2:27.6
22	35	Alena Sannikova	Belarus	43:23.2	+2:27.9
23	12	Riitta-Liisa Roponen	Finland	43:30.2	+2:34.9
24	32	Riikka Sarasoja	Finland	43:32.4	+2:37.1
25	58	Elena Kolomina	Kazakhstan	43:32.9	+2:37.6
26	34	Svetlana Malahova-Shishkina	Kazakhstan	43:35.1	+2:39.8
27	23	Olga Rocheva	Russia	43:37.4	+2:42.1
28	21	Sabina Valbusa	Italy	43:47.7	+2:52.4
29	68	Hongxue Li	China	43:48.5	+2:53.2
30	28	Sylwia Jaśkowiec	Poland	43:49.9	+2:54.6
31	45	Morgan Arritola	United States	43:51.3	+2:56.0
32	43	Ivana Janečková	Czech Republic	43:59.0	+3:03.7
33	30	Olga Zavyalova	Russia	44:04.8	+3:09.5
34	29	Coraline Hugue	France	44:15.6	+3:20.3
35	27	Natalya Korostelyova	Russia	44:22.0	+3:26.7
36	25	Astrid Uhrenholdt Jacobsen	Norway	44:24.4	+3:29.1
37	53	Vita Yakymchuk	Ukraine	44:25.9	+3:30.6
38	51	Olga Vasiljonok	Belarus	44:32.0	+3:36.7
39	40	Kornelia Marek	Poland	44:32.7	+3:37.4
40	42	Lada Nesterenko	Ukraine	44:39.5	+3:44.2
41	46	Helena Erbenová	Czech Republic	45:13.5	+4:18.2
42	36	Cécile Storti	France	45:13.9	+4:18.6
43	67	Ekaterina Rudakova	Belarus	45:15.2	+4:19.9
44	54	Tatyana Roshchina	Kazakhstan	45:18.8	+4:23.5
45	41	Tatjana Mannima	Estonia	45:32.9	+4:37.6
46	63	Daria Gaiazova	Canada	45:33.8	+4:38.5
47	59	Shayla Swanson	Canada	45:39.2	+4:43.9
48	47	Barbara Jezeršek	Slovenia	45:55.2	+4:59.9
49	57	Eva Skalníková	Czech Republic	46:00.5	+5:05.2
50	49	Hanna Brodin	Sweden	46:01.8	+5:06.5
51	52	Zoya Obiukh	Ukraine	46:18.9	+5:23.6
52	39	Laure Barthélémy	France	46:28.1	+5:32.8
53	55	Nobuko Fukuda	Japan	46:28.3	+5:33.0
54	62	Nastassia Dubarezava	Belarus	46:47.4	+5:52.1
55	50	Katherine Calder	New Zealand	46:55.8	+6:00.5
56	69	Xin Li	China	47:18.0	+6:22.7
57	64	Paulina Maciuszek	Poland	47:30.0	+6:34.7
58	56	Caitlin Compton	United States	47:35.3	+6:40.0
59	65	Aimee Watson	Australia	47:48.7	+6:53.4
60	48	Laura Rohtla	Estonia	49:13.2	+8:17.9
61	74	Maria Danou	Greece	LAP	
62	76	Otgontsetseg Chinbat	Mongolia	LAP	
63	77	Julia Zamyatina	Kyrgyzstan	LAP	
64	75	Jaqueline Mourão	Brazil	LAP	
65	73	Olga Reshetkova	Kyrgyzstan	LAP	
66	70	Fiona Hughes	United Kingdom	LAP	
67	71	Sarah Young	United Kingdom	LAP	
68	66	Mónika György	Romania	LAP	
69	61	Antonia Grigorova-Burgova	Bulgaria	LAP	
—	26	Yuliya Chepalova	Russia	DSQ	
—	16	Claudia Nystad	Germany	DNF	
—	17	Kateřina Smutná	Austria	DNF	
—	31	Seraina Mischol	Switzerland	DNF	
—	60	Kelime Çetinkaya	Turkey	DNF	
—	72	Dandan Man	China	DNF	
—	11	Stefanie Böhler	Germany	DNS	
—	33	Maria Rydqvist	Sweden	DNS	
