= FIS Nordic World Ski Championships 2011 – Women's 15 kilometre pursuit =

Women's 15 kilometre pursuit at the FIS Nordic World Ski Championships 2011
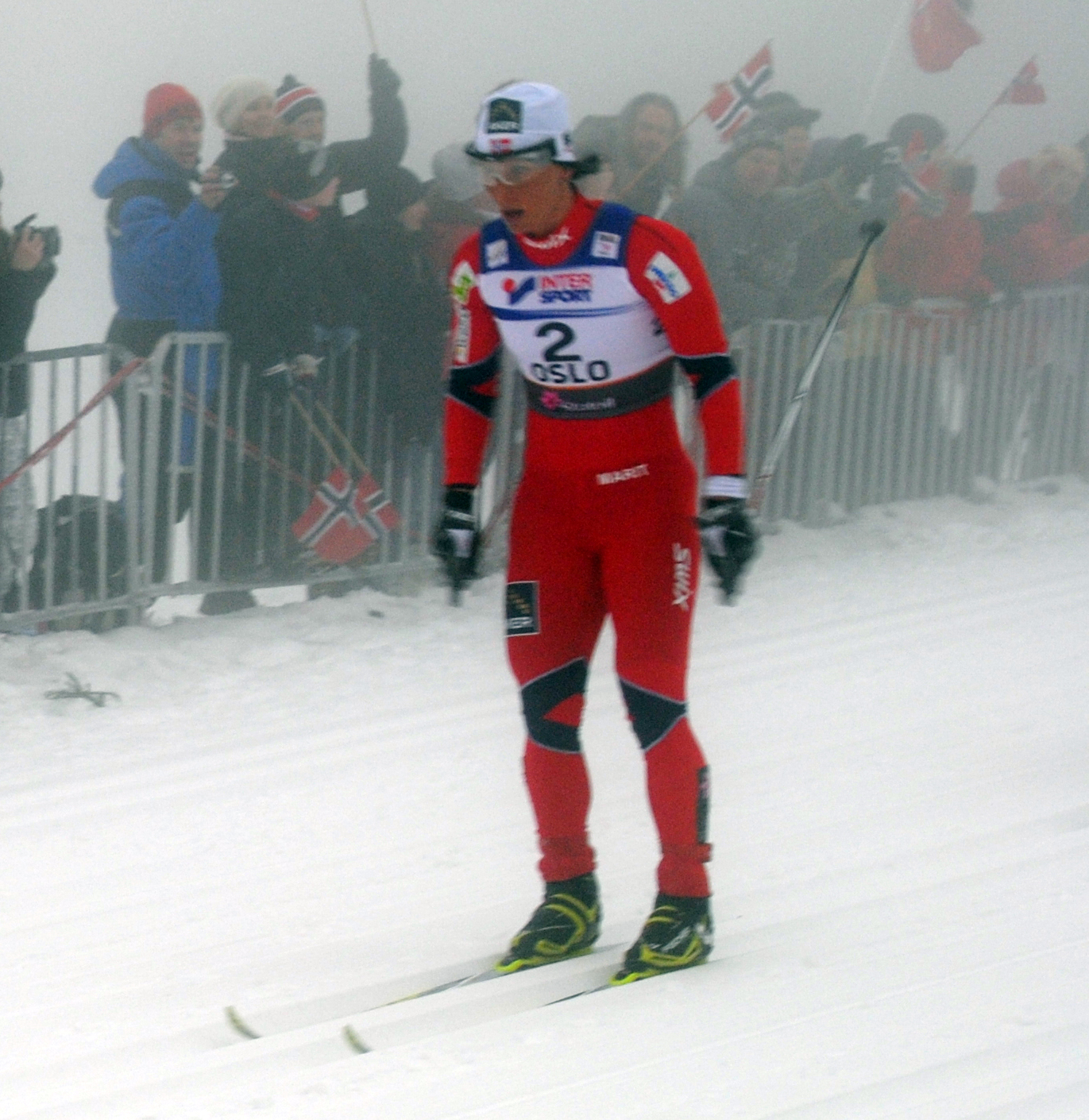
- Marit Bjørgen at Frognerseteren
- Venue: Holmenkollen National Arena
- Date: 26 February 2011
- Competitors: 56 from 23 nations
- Winning time: 38:08.6

Medalists
gold medal	Marit Bjørgen	Norway
silver medal	Justyna Kowalczyk	Poland
bronze medal	Therese Johaug	Norway

The women's 15 kilometre pursuit at the FIS Nordic World Ski Championships 2011 was held on 26 February 2011 at 11:30 CET. The defending world champion was Poland's Justyna Kowalczyk while the defending Olympic champion was Norway's Marit Bjørgen.

== Results ==
Rank	Bib	Athlete	Country	Time	Deficit
1st place, gold medalist(s)	2	Marit Bjørgen	Norway	38:08.6	
2nd place, silver medalist(s)	1	Justyna Kowalczyk	Poland	38:16.1	+7.5
3rd place, bronze medalist(s)	4	Therese Johaug	Norway	38:17.4	+8.8
4	5	Charlotte Kalla	Sweden	39:02.5	+53.9
5	3	Marianna Longa	Italy	39:17.0	+1:08.4
6	17	Maria Rydqvist	Sweden	39:17.4	+1:08.8
7	18	Nicole Fessel	Germany	39:17.4	+1:08.8
8	7	Aino-Kaisa Saarinen	Finland	39:19.9	+1:11.3
9	15	Kristin Størmer Steira	Norway	39:24.6	+1:16.0
10	9	Anna Haag	Sweden	39:46.8	+1:38.2
11	16	Masako Ishida	Japan	40:02.9	+1:54.3
12	12	Yuliya Chekalyova	Russia	40:05.5	+1:56.9
13	22	Evi Sachenbacher-Stehle	Germany	40:05.8	+1:57.2
14	8	Riitta-Liisa Roponen	Finland	40:06.9	+1:58.3
15	11	Marthe Kristoffersen	Norway	40:07.7	+1:59.1
16	13	Katrin Zeller	Germany	40:11.0	+2:02.4
17	14	Valentyna Shevchenko	Ukraine	40:37.9	+2:29.3
18	20	Riikka Sarasoja	Finland	40:50.7	+2:42.1
19	6	Arianna Follis	Italy	40:51.3	+2:42.7
20	27	Barbara Jezeršek	Slovenia	40:57.1	+2:48.5
21	19	Alena Procházková	Slovakia	40:58.7	+2:50.1
22	31	Ivana Janečková	Czech Republic	41:03.0	+2:54.4
23	29	Elena Kolomina	Kazakhstan	41:03.3	+2:54.7
24	37	Elizabeth Stephen	United States	41:03.5	+2:54.9
25	32	Holly Brooks	United States	41:21.5	+3:12.9
26	23	Valentina Novikova	Russia	41:22.7	+3:14.1
27	26	Yuliya Ivanova	Russia	41:25.9	+3:17.3
28	42	Jessie Diggins	United States	41:33.8	+3:25.2
29	50	Oxana Yatskaya	Kazakhstan	41:35.2	+3:26.6
30	35	Sara Lindborg	Sweden	41:35.3	+3:26.7
31	10	Krista Lähteenmäki	Finland	41:50.7	+3:42.1
32	40	Paulina Maciuszek	Poland	41:51.2	+3:42.6
33	28	Kateryna Grygorenko	Ukraine	41:54.9	+3:46.3
34	33	Eva Nývltová	Czech Republic	42:00.0	+3:51.4
35	30	Virginia de Martin Topranin	Italy	42:01.9	+3:53.3
36	25	Svetlana Malakhova-Shishkina	Kazakhstan	42:02.4	+3:53.8
37	49	Lada Nesterenko	Ukraine	42:06.6	+3:58.0
38	21	Laure Barthélémy	France	42:33.3	+4:24.7
39	34	Aurore Jéan	France	42:33.9	+4:25.3
40	24	Stefanie Böhler	Germany	42:38.9	+4:30.3
41	48	Laura Rohtla	Estonia	42:52.8	+4:44.2
42	44	Yuki Kobayashi	Japan	43:08.1	+4:59.5
43	41	Morgan Arritola	United States	43:09.5	+5:00.9
44	36	Svetlana Bochkareva	Russia	43:16.7	+5:08.1
45	43	Laura Orgué	Spain	43:39.9	+5:31.3
46	46	Mónika György	Romania	43:40.0	+5:31.4
47	47	Lee Chae-won	South Korea	43:40.8	+5:32.6
48	38	Célia Bourgeois	France	44:11.9	+5:53.7
49	52	Marina Matrosova	Kazakhstan	44:12.2	+5:54.0
50	45	Maryna Antsybor	Ukraine	45:09.9	+6:51.7
51	39	Brooke Gosling	Canada	45:18.2	+7:00.0
52	54	Esther Bottomley	Australia	46:32.4	+8:14.2
53	53	Rosamund Musgrave	United Kingdom	48:11.2	+9:53.0
	55	Mirlene Picin	Brazil	LAP	
	56	Irina Khodiakova	Kyrgyzstan	LAP	
	51	Agnieszka Szymańczak	Poland	DNS	
