= FIS Nordic World Ski Championships 2011 – Women's 4 × 5 kilometre relay =

Women's 4 × 5 kilometre relay at the FIS Nordic World Ski Championships 2011
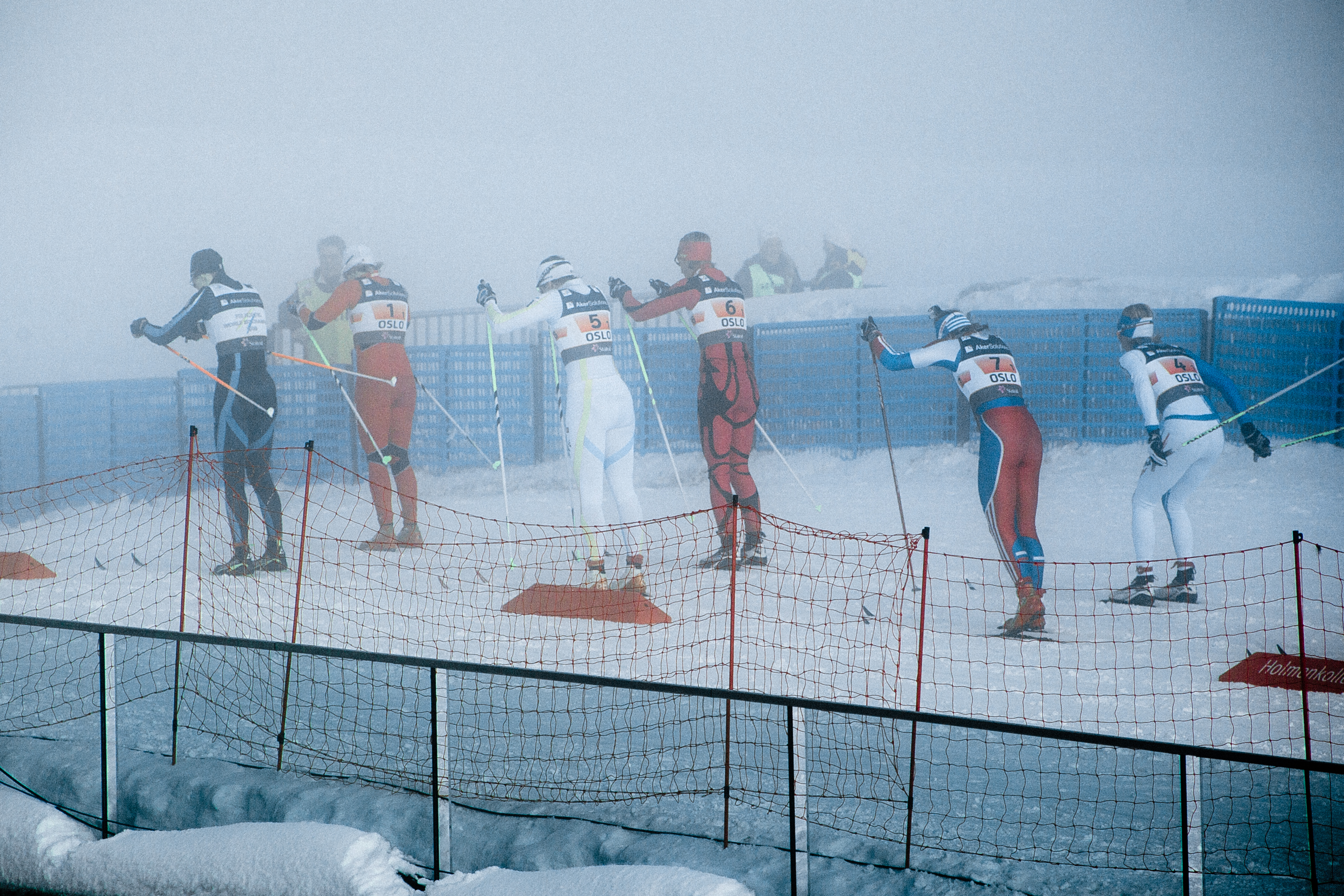
- Venue: Holmenkollen National Arena
- Date: 2 March 2011
- Competitors: 32 from 16 nations
- Teams: 16
- Winning time: 19:25.0

Medalists
gold medal	Vibeke Skofterud; Therese Johaug; Kristin Størmer Steira; Marit Bjørgen	Norway
silver medal	Ida Ingemarsdotter; Anna Haag; Britta Johansson Norgren; Charlotte Kalla	Sweden
bronze medal	Pirjo Muranen; Aino-Kaisa Saarinen; Riitta-Liisa Roponen; Krista Lähteenmäki	Finland

The Women's 4 × 5 kilometre relay at the FIS Nordic World Ski Championships 2011 was held on 3 March 2011 at 14:00 CET. The defending world champions were the Finnish team of Pirjo Muranen, Virpi Kuitunen, Riitta-Liisa Roponen and Aino-Kaisa Saarinen while the defending Olympic champions were the Norwegian team of Vibeke Skofterud, Therese Johaug, Kristin Størmer Steira and Marit Bjørgen. Kuitunen retired after the 2009-10 season.

== Results ==
Rank	Bib	Country	Athlete	Time	Deficit
1st place, gold medalist(s)	1	Norway	Vibeke Skofterud; Therese Johaug; Kristin Størmer Steira; Marit Bjørgen	53:30.0; 13:58.8; 13:47.7; 12:58.3; 12:45.2	
2nd place, silver medalist(s)	5	Sweden	Ida Ingemarsdotter; Anna Haag; Britta Johansson Norgren; Charlotte Kalla	54:06.1; 13:49.3; 14:05.9; 13:24.3; 12:46.6	+36.1
3rd place, bronze medalist(s)	3	Finland	Pirjo Muranen; Aino-Kaisa Saarinen; Riitta-Liisa Roponen; Krista Lähteenmäki	54:29.8; 13:56.6; 14:03.6; 13:20.3; 13:09.3	+59.8
4	4	Italy	Marianna Longa; Antonella Confortola Wyatt; Silvia Rupil; Arianna Follis	54:56.1; 13:47.9; 14:56.3; 13:18.7; 12:53.2	+1:26.1
5	2	Germany	Stefanie Böhler; Katrin Zeller; Evi Sachenbacher-Stehle; Nicole Fessel	55:11.8; 14:20.9; 14:08.5; 13:23.5; 13:18.9	+1:41.8
6	7	Russia	Valentina Novikova; Aliya Iksanova; Yuliya Chekalyova; Olga Mikhailova	55:45.4; 14:26.6; 14:50.4; 12:56.6; 13:31.8	+2:15.4
7	12	Slovenia	Anja Eržen; Petra Majdič; Vesna Fabjan; Barbara Jezeršek	55:53.0; 14:45.9; 13:41.7; 13:43.2; 13:42.2	+2:23.0
8	14	Poland	Ewelina Marcisz; Justyna Kowalczyk; Paulina Maciuszek; Agnieszka Szymańczak	56:19.2; 14:52.7; 13:34.7; 13:46.0; 14:05.8	+2:49.2
9	10	United States	Kikkan Randall; Holly Brooks; Elizabeth Stephen; Jessie Diggins	56:24.7; 14:28.1; 14:55.8; 13:35.2; 13:25.6	+2:54.7
10	8	Japan	Madoka Natsumi; Masako Ishida; Yuki Kobayashi; Michito Kashiwabara	56:25.8; 14:28.8; 14:13.5; 13:46.9; 13:56.6	+2:55.8
11	9	Kazakhstan	Elena Kolomina; Oxana Yatskaya; Tatyana Roshchina; Svetlana Malakhova-Shishkina	56:31.2; 14:14.5; 14:30.0; 14:21.5; 13:25.2	+3:01.2
12	11	Ukraine	Kateryna Grygorenko; Lada Nesterenko; Valentyna Shevchenko; Maryna Antsybor	56:52.6; 14:46.2; 15:17.1; 13:14.7; 13:34.6	+3:22.6
13	6	France	Aurore Jéan; Laure Barthélémy; Célia Bourgeois; Émilie Vina	56:53.2; 15:15.0; 14:45.3; 13:18.2; 13:34.7	+3:23.2
14	13	Canada	Daria Gaiazova; Perianne Jones; Chandra Crawford; Brooke Gosling	58:19.2; 14:37.6; 15:11.7; 13:59.3; 14:30.6	+4:49.2

== See also ==
- 2011 IPC Biathlon and Cross-Country Skiing World Championships – Women's relay
