= Sara Renner =

Canadian cross-country skier

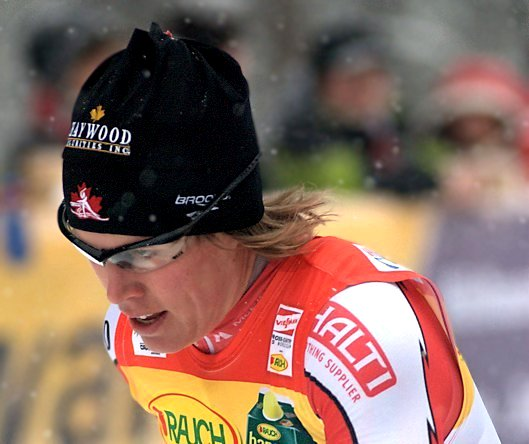

Personal information
- Nationality: Canada
- Born: 10 April 1976 (age 50) Golden, British Columbia, Canada
- Height: 5 ft 6 in (1.68 m)

Sport
- Sport: Skiing
- Club: Canmore Nordic Ski Club

World Cup career
- Seasons: 13 – (1996–1998, 2000–2006, 2008–2010)
- Indiv. starts: 141
- Indiv. podiums: 4
- Indiv. wins: 0
- Team starts: 18
- Team podiums: 2
- Team wins: 0
- Overall titles: 0 – (10th in 2006)
- Discipline titles: 0
Medal record
Women's cross-country skiing
Representing Canada
Olympic Games
Silver medal – second place	2006 Turin	Team sprint
World Championships
Bronze medal – third place	2005 Oberstdorf	Individual sprint

Sara Renner (born April 10, 1976) is a Canadian former cross-country skier who competed from 1994 to 2010. With Beckie Scott, she won the silver medal in the team sprint event at the 2006 Winter Olympics in Turin and earned her best individual finish of eight in the 10 km classical event in those same games. She was born in Golden, British Columbia.

== 2006 Winter Olympics ==
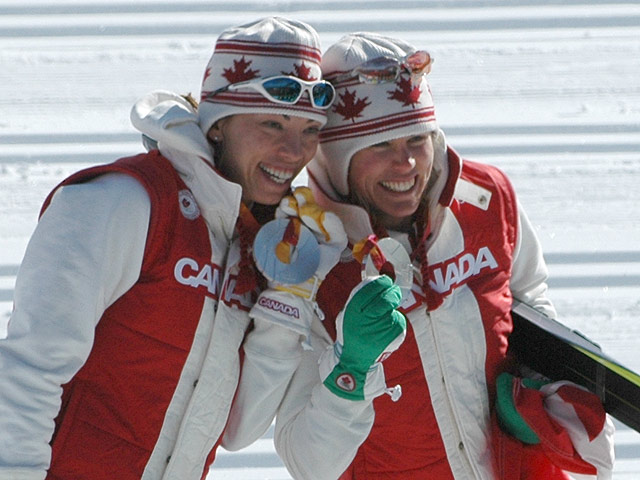
With Beckie Scott (left) at the 2006 Winter Olympics

Norwegian coach Bjørnar Håkensmoen gave Sara Renner a ski pole after hers was broken when a competitor stepped on it during the cross-country team sprint at the 2006 Winter Olympics. Norway's athlete ended up fourth, implying that this selfless act of sportsmanship may well have cost the Norwegian team a medal. Renner gave Håkensmoen a bottle of wine as a thank you, while other Canadians responded with phone calls and letters to the Norwegian Embassy and sent 7,400 cans of maple syrup to Håkensmoen. The incident was immortalized in a 2010 Winter Olympics television commercial.

== Retirement ==
She announced her retirement in Vancouver following her finish in the Women's 30 km, Mass Start event. She said: "I just left everything out there today," Renner said after carrying her three-year-old daughter, Aria, in her arms through a series of TV interviews. "It was a beautiful race in the pouring rain — quite the way to go out. To hear everyone cheering for me, it was absolutely inspiring."

== Cross-country skiing results ==
All results are sourced from the International Ski Federation (FIS).

=== Olympic Games ===
- 1 medal – (1 silver)

Year	Age	5 km	10 km	15 km	Pursuit	30 km	Sprint	4 × 5 km relay	Team sprint
1998	21	74	—N/a	—	64	54	—N/a	16	—N/a
2002	25	—N/a	13	—	17	DNS	9	8	—N/a
2006	29	—N/a	8	—N/a	16	—	16	10	Silver
2010	33	—N/a	—	—N/a	10	15	34	—	7

=== World Championships ===
- 1 medal – (1 bronze)

Year	Age	5 km	10 km	15 km	Pursuit	30 km	Sprint	4 × 5 km relay	Team sprint
1997	20	61	—N/a	58	54	DNF	—N/a	14	—N/a
2001	24	—N/a	37	—	37	CNX^{[a]}	38	6	—N/a
2003	26	—N/a	16	—	17	12	7	—	—N/a
2005	28	—N/a	—	—N/a	22	—	Bronze	—	10
2009	32	—N/a	9	—N/a	21	DNS	—	—	6

a. ^{1} Cancelled due to extremely cold weather.

=== World Cup ===
==== Season standings ====
Season	Age	Discipline standings					Ski Tour standings	
Season	Age	Overall	Distance	Long Distance	Middle Distance	Sprint	Tour de Ski	World Cup Final
1996	19	NC	—N/a	—N/a	—N/a	—N/a	—N/a	—N/a
1997	20	NC	—N/a	NC	—N/a	—	—N/a	—N/a
1998	21	NC	—N/a	NC	—N/a	—	—N/a	—N/a
2000	23	NC	—N/a	—	NC	—	—N/a	—N/a
2001	24	63	—N/a	—N/a	—N/a	54	—N/a	—N/a
2002	25	47	—N/a	—N/a	—N/a	30	—N/a	—N/a
2003	26	35	—N/a	—N/a	—N/a	21	—N/a	—N/a
2004	27	28	33	—N/a	—N/a	23	—N/a	—N/a
2005	28	26	35	—N/a	—N/a	14	—N/a	—N/a
2006	29	10	15	—N/a	—N/a	11	—N/a	—N/a
2008	31	46	36	—N/a	—N/a	43	—	—
2009	32	22	18	—N/a	—N/a	45	15	31
2010	33	39	40	—N/a	—N/a	41	16	—

==== Individual podiums ====
- 4 podiums – (4 WC)

No.	Season	Date	Location	Race	Level	Place
1	2005–06	11 December 2005	Vernon, Canada	1.3 km Sprint F	World Cup	3rd
2	2005–06	5 February 2006	Davos, Switzerland	10 km Individual C	World Cup	2nd
3	2005–06	7 March 2006	Borlänge, Sweden	0.75 km Sprint F	World Cup	3rd
4	2009–10	6 February 2010	Canmore, Canada	1.45 km Sprint C	World Cup	3rd

==== Team podiums ====
- 2 podiums – (1 RL, 1 TS)

No.	Season	Date	Location	Race	Level	Place	Teammate(s)
1	2000–01	13 January 2001	Soldier Hollow, United States	4 × 5 km Relay C/F	World Cup	2nd	Thériault / Scott / Fortier
2	2005–06	18 December 2005	Canmore, Canada	6 × 1.2 km Team Sprint C	World Cup	2nd	Scott

== Personal life ==
Renner grew up at remote Mount Assiniboine Lodge, the oldest backcountry ski lodge in the Canadian Rockies, located southwest of Banff and Canmore, Alberta, just across the British Columbia provincial border. Her parents ran the high-altitude lodge for three decades, and she credits her youth there for her skiing success.

In 2001 Renner posed nude in a calendar called "Nordic Nudes" to help raise money for the Canadian women's Nordic ski team. Teammates Beckie Scott, Milaine Thériault, Jaime Fortier and sister Amanda Fortier also posed nude for the calendar.

Renner is married to retired Italian-Canadian alpine skier Thomas Grandi. Grandi had family support out for himself and his wife during the Turin Olympics.

On September 18, 2006, Renner announced that she was taking the year off to have a baby with husband Thomas Grandi. Renner came back after her baby was born, and lead the women's team to Vancouver 2010.

On February 2, 2007, Renner gave birth to a girl named Aria at a hospital in Banff, Alberta. She and Grandi live in Canmore, Alberta.
