= Yevgeniya Medvedeva (cross-country skier) =

Russian cross-country skier

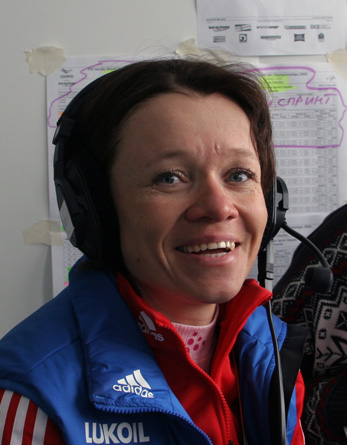
- Medvedeva in 2009

Personal information
- Nationality: Russia
- Born: July 4, 1976 (age 50) Kondopoga, Soviet Union

Sport
- Sport: Skiing

World Cup career
- Seasons: 12 – (1997–1998, 2000–2003, 2005–2010)
- Indiv. starts: 111
- Indiv. podiums: 5
- Indiv. wins: 1
- Team starts: 24
- Team podiums: 5
- Team wins: 2
- Overall titles: 0 – (17th in 2005)
- Discipline titles: 0
Medal record
Women's cross-country skiing
Representing Russia
Olympic Games
| Gold medal – first place | 2006 Turin | 4 × 5 km relay |
| Bronze medal – third place | 2006 Turin | 15 km double pursuit |
World Championships
| Silver medal – second place | 2005 Oberstdorf | 4 × 5 km relay |
| Silver medal – second place | 2009 Liberec | 30 km freestyle |

Yevgeniya Vladimirovna Medvedeva (Russian: Евге́ния Влади́мировна Медве́дева-Арбу́зова; born 4 July 1976 in Kondopoga, Karelian ASSR) is a Russian cross-country skier who has competed since 1996. Competing in two Winter Olympics, she won two medals at Turin in 2006 with a gold in the 4 × 5 km relay and a bronze in the 7.5 km + 7.5 km double pursuit.

Medvedeva-Arbuzova also won two silver medals at the FIS Nordic World Ski Championships (30 km: 2009, 4 × 5 km relay: 2005).

== Cross-country skiing results ==
All results are sourced from the International Ski Federation (FIS).

=== Olympic Games ===
- 2 medals – (1 gold, 1 bronze)

| Year | Age | 10 km individual | 15 km skiathlon | 30 km mass start | Sprint | 4 × 5 km relay | Team sprint |
|---|---|---|---|---|---|---|---|
| 2006 | 29 | — | Bronze | 21 | — | Gold | — |
| 2010 | 33 | 7 | 39 | — | — | 7 | — |

=== World Championships ===
- 2 medals – (2 silver)

| Year | Age | 10 km individual | 15 km classical | Pursuit | 30 km | Sprint | 4 × 5 km relay | Team sprint |
|---|---|---|---|---|---|---|---|---|
| 2003 | 26 | — | — | 22 | 27 | — | — | —N/a |
| 2005 | 28 | 10 | —N/a | — | — | — | Silver | — |
| 2007 | 30 | 11 | —N/a | 18 | — | — | 7 | — |
| 2009 | 32 | — | —N/a | 12 | Silver | — | DSQ | — |

=== World Cup ===
==== Season standings ====
| Season | Age | Discipline standings | | | | | Ski Tour standings | |
| Season | Age | Overall | Distance | Long Distance | Middle Distance | Sprint | Tour de Ski | World Cup Final |
|---|---|---|---|---|---|---|---|---|
| 1997 | 20 | NC | —N/a | NC | —N/a | — | —N/a | —N/a |
| 1998 | 21 | NC | —N/a | NC | —N/a | — | —N/a | —N/a |
| 2000 | 23 | NC | —N/a | — | NC | — | —N/a | —N/a |
| 2001 | 24 | 59 | —N/a | —N/a | —N/a | NC | —N/a | —N/a |
| 2002 | 25 | 37 | —N/a | —N/a | —N/a | NC | —N/a | —N/a |
| 2003 | 26 | 32 | —N/a | —N/a | —N/a | 58 | —N/a | —N/a |
| 2005 | 28 | 17 | 11 | —N/a | —N/a | NC | —N/a | —N/a |
| 2006 | 29 | 41 | 26 | —N/a | —N/a | — | —N/a | —N/a |
| 2007 | 30 | 42 | 20 | —N/a | —N/a | NC | 34 | —N/a |
| 2008 | 31 | 24 | 19 | —N/a | —N/a | NC | 24 | 25 |
| 2009 | 32 | 20 | 16 | —N/a | —N/a | 80 | 18 | 17 |
| 2010 | 33 | 25 | 18 | —N/a | —N/a | NC | 11 | — |

==== Individual podiums ====
- 1 victory – (1 WC)
- 5 podiums – (4 WC, 1 SWC)

| No. | Season | Date | Location | Race | Level | Place |
|---|---|---|---|---|---|---|
| 1 | 2004–05 | 18 December 2004 | Ramsau, Austria | 15 km Mass Start F | World Cup | 3rd |
| 2 | 2004–05 | 12 February 2005 | Reit im Winkl, Germany | 10 km Individual F | World Cup | 1st |
| 3 | 2007–08 | 22 January 2008 | Canmore, Canada | 7.5 km + 7.5 km Pursuit C/F | World Cup | 2nd |
| 4 | 2007–08 | 25 January 2008 | Canmore, Canada | 10 km Individual F | World Cup | 2nd |
| 5 | 2009–10 | 10 January 2010 | Val di Fiemme, Italy | 9 km Pursuit F | Stage World Cup | 3rd |

==== Team podiums ====
- 2 victories – (1 RL, 1 TS)
- 5 podiums – (4 RL, 1 TS)

| No. | Season | Date | Location | Race | Level | Place | Teammate(s) |
|---|---|---|---|---|---|---|---|
| 1 | 2001–02 | 13 January 2002 | Nové Město, Czech Republic | 4 × 1.5 km Team Sprint F | World Cup | 1st | Chepalova |
| 2 | 2004–05 | 8 December 2002 | Davos, Switzerland | 4 × 5 km Relay C/F | World Cup | 2nd | Zavyalova / Vasilieva / Gavrylyuk |
| 3 | 2004–05 | 12 December 2004 | Val di Fiemme, Italy | 4 × 5 km Relay C/F | World Cup | 1st | Kurkina / Baranova-Masalkina / Chepalova |
| 4 | 2004–05 | 20 March 2005 | Falun, Sweden | 4 × 5 km Relay C/F | World Cup | 3rd | Kurkina / Baranova-Masalkina / Chepalova |
| 5 | 2005–06 | 15 January 2006 | Val di Fiemme, Italy | 4 × 5 km Relay C/F | World Cup | 2nd | Rocheva / Baranova-Masalkina / Chepalova |
