= Kirsi =

Kirsi is a Finnish female given name. Its nameday is celebrated on 24 July. It began to be used in the 1940s, and it reached its peak of popularity in the 1960s and 1970s. As of 2013 there are 23,000 women with this name in Finland. The name Kirsi originated as a short form of Kristiina, Finnish version of Christina or Kirsikka which means cherry in Finnish. It also means frost in Finnish.

Notable people with this name include:

- Kirsi Ahonen (born 1976), Finnish javelin thrower
- Kirsi Boström (born 1968), Finnish orienteer
- Kirsi Hänninen (born 1976), Finnish ice hockey player
- Kirsi Heikkinen (born 1978), Finnish football referee
- Kirsi Helen (born 1982), Finnish cross-country skier
- Kirsi Kunnas (1924 - 2021), Finnish poet
- Kirsi Lampinen (born 1972), Finnish tennis player
- Kirsi Mykkänen (born 1978), Finnish sprinter
- Kirsi Ojansuu (born 1963), Finnish politician
- Kirsi Peltonen, Finnish mathematician
- Kirsi Perälä (born 1982), Finnish cross-country skier
- Kirsi Piha (born 1967), Finnish politician
- Kirsi Rauta (born 1962), Finnish marathon runner
- Kirsi Välimaa (born 1978), Finnish cross country skier
- Kirsi Viilonen (better known as Kikka, 1964–2005), Finnish singer
- Kirsi Ylijoki (born 1969), Finnish actress
