= Olga Rocheva =

Russian cross-country skier

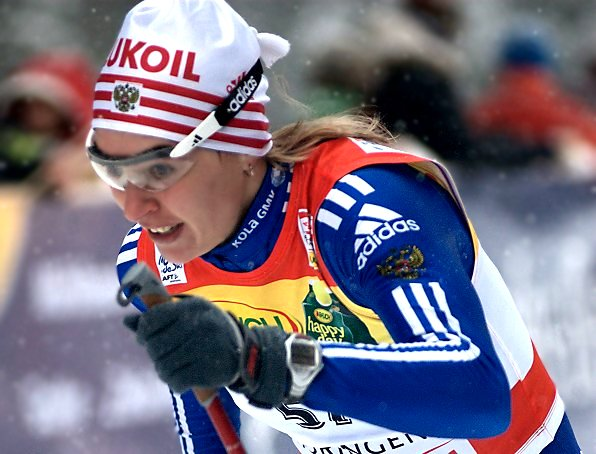
- Rocheva in 2010

Personal information
- Nationality: Russia
- Born: 4 July 1978 (age 48) Krasnoyarsk, Soviet Union

Sport
- Sport: Skiing

World Cup career
- Seasons: 14 – (1999–2003, 2005–2006, 2008–2011, 2012–2013, 2017)
- Indiv. starts: 115
- Indiv. podiums: 1
- Indiv. wins: 0
- Team starts: 21
- Team podiums: 5
- Team wins: 0
- Overall titles: 0 – (12th in 2008)
- Discipline titles: 0
Medal record
Women'scross-country skiing
Representing Russia
Junior World Championships
Bronze medal – third place	1998 Pontresina	4 × 5 km relay

Olga Vladimirovna Rocheva (Russian: О́льга Влади́мировна Ро́чева) (born 4 July 1978 in Krasnoyarsk) is a Russian cross-country skier who has competed since 1999. Competing in two Winter Olympics, she earned her best finish of sixth in the team sprint at Turin in 2006 and had her best individual finish of 14th in the individual sprint event at those same games.

At the FIS Nordic World Ski Championships 2009 in Liberec, Rocheva finished eighth in the 4 × 5 km relay, 11th in the 10 km, and 27th in the 7.5 km + 7.5 km double pursuit events.

Her best individual World Cup finish was third in a 7.5 km + 7.5 km double pursuit event in Canada in 2008 while Rocheva's best World Cup finish second twice, both in 4 × 5 km relays in 2001 and 2006.

== Cross-country skiing results ==
All results are sourced from the International Ski Federation (FIS).

=== Olympic Games ===
Year	Age	10 km individual	15 km skiathlon	30 km mass start	Sprint	4 × 5 km relay	Team sprint
2006	27	—	—	18	14	—	6
2010	31	—	26	29	40	—	—

=== World Championships ===
Year	Age	10 km individual	15 km skiathlon	30 km mass start	Sprint	4 × 5 km relay	Team sprint
2009	30	11	27	—	—	DSQ	—

=== World Cup ===
==== Season standings ====
Season	Age	Discipline standings					Ski Tour standings		
Season	Age	Overall	Distance	Long Distance	Middle Distance	Sprint	Nordic Opening	Tour de Ski	World Cup Final
1999	20	61	—N/a	61	—N/a	66	—N/a	—N/a	—N/a
2000	21	NC	—N/a	—	NC	—	—N/a	—N/a	—N/a
2001	22	33	—N/a	—N/a	—N/a	44	—N/a	—N/a	—N/a
2002	23	63	—N/a	—N/a	—N/a	49	—N/a	—N/a	—N/a
2003	24	75	—N/a	—N/a	—N/a	60	—N/a	—N/a	—N/a
2005	26	93	62	—N/a	—N/a	NC	—N/a	—N/a	—N/a
2006	27	19	19	—N/a	—N/a	21	—N/a	—N/a	—N/a
2008	29	12	12	—N/a	—N/a	22	—N/a	5	20
2009	30	37	34	—N/a	—N/a	52	—N/a	19	—
2010	31	30	23	—N/a	—N/a	23	—N/a	DNF	30
2012	33	52	31	—N/a	—N/a	66	—	—	—
2013	34	75	51	—N/a	—N/a	—	—	—	—
2017	38	NC	NC	—N/a	—N/a	—	—	—	—

==== Individual podiums ====
- 1 podium

No.	Season	Date	Location	Race	Level	Place
1	2007–08	22 January 2008	Canmore, Canada	7.5 km + 7.5 km Skiathlon C/F	World Cup	3rd

==== Team podiums ====
- 5 podiums – (3 RL, 2 TS)

No.	Season	Date	Location	Race	Level	Place	Teammate(s)
1	2000–01	13 December 2000	Clusone, Italy	6 × 1.5 km Team Sprint F	World Cup	3rd	Schastlivaya
2	2001–02	16 December 2001	Davos, Switzerland	4 × 5 km Relay C/F	World Cup	2nd	Sidko / Burukhina / Schastlivaya
3	2005–06	15 January 2006	Val di Fiemme, Italy	4 × 5 km Relay C/F	World Cup	2nd	Baranova-Masalkina / Medvedeva-Arbuzova / Chepalova
4	2007–08	9 December 2007	Davos, Switzerland	4 × 5 km Relay C/F	World Cup	3rd	Kurkina / Chekalyova / Korostelyova
5	2009–10	24 January 2010	Rybinsk, Russia	6 × 1.3 km Team Sprint F	World Cup	3rd	Khazova
