= Bjørnar =

Bjørnar is a given name. Notable people with the name include:

- Bjørnar Andersen (born 1978), Norwegian refrigerator mechanic and competitive dog musher
- Bjørnar Håkensmoen (born 1969), the head coach of the Norwegian cross-country skiing team at the 2006 Winter Olympics
- Bjørnar Holmvik (born 1985), Norwegian football defender
- Bjørnar Johannessen (born 1977), Norwegian football midfielder
- Bjørnar Laabak (born 1961), Norwegian politician
- Bjørnar Moxnes (born 1981), Norwegian politician and leader of the Red Party
- Bjørnar Neteland (born 1991), alpine skier
- Bjørnar Valstad (born 1967), Norwegian orienteering athlete, winner of 4 World Orienteering Championships gold medals

== See also ==
- Arna-Bjørnar Fotball, Norwegian football club from Arna, Bergen
- Bjorn
