= Milaine Thériault =

Canadian cross-country skier

Personal information
- Nationality: Canada
- Born: November 14, 1973 (age 52) Saint-Quentin, New Brunswick, Canada

Sport
- Sport: Skiing
- Club: Foothills Nordic Ski Club

World Cup career
- Seasons: 11 – (1994–1995, 1997–1999, 2001–2005, 2009)
- Indiv. starts: 53
- Indiv. podiums: 0
- Team starts: 10
- Team podiums: 1
- Team wins: 0
- Overall titles: 0 – (60th in 2002)
- Discipline titles: 0

Milaine Thériault (born November 14, 1973, in Saint-Quentin, New Brunswick) is a retired Canadian cross-country skier.

In February, 2004 Thériault won her second consecutive women's five km free technique at the Haywood NorAm Canada Cup competition in Kelowna, British Columbia

== Cross-country skiing results ==
All results are sourced from the International Ski Federation (FIS).

=== Olympic Games ===
Year	Age	5 km	10 km	15 km	Pursuit	30 km	Sprint	4 × 5 km relay	Team sprint
1998	24	54	—N/a	59	56	—	—N/a	16	—N/a
2002	28	—N/a	23	—	33	31	31	8	—N/a
2006	32	—N/a	46	—N/a	54	DNS	—	10	—

=== World Championships ===
Year	Age	5 km	10 km	15 km	Pursuit	30 km	Sprint	4 × 5 km relay	Team sprint
1995	21	—	—N/a	48	—	—	—N/a	—	—N/a
1997	23	70	—N/a	—	58	47	—N/a	14	—N/a
1999	25	60	—N/a	—	DNF	41	—N/a	15	—N/a
2001	27	—N/a	34	25	—	CNX^{[a]}	28	6	—N/a
2005	31	—N/a	—	—N/a	34	37	21	—	—

a. ^{1} Cancelled due to extremely cold weather.

=== World Cup ===
==== Season standings ====
Season	Age	Discipline standings				Ski Tour standings	
Season	Age	Overall	Distance	Long Distance	Sprint	Tour de Ski	World Cup Final
1994	20	NC	—N/a	—N/a	—N/a	—N/a	—N/a
1995	21	NC	—N/a	—N/a	—N/a	—N/a	—N/a
1997	23	NC	—N/a	NC	—	—N/a	—N/a
1998	24	NC	—N/a	NC	—	—N/a	—N/a
1999	25	NC	—N/a	NC	—	—N/a	—N/a
2001	27	73	—N/a	—N/a	82	—N/a	—N/a
2002	28	60	—N/a	—N/a	39	—N/a	—N/a
2003	29	NC	—N/a	—N/a	NC	—N/a	—N/a
2004	30	NC	NC	—N/a	NC	—N/a	—N/a
2005	31	89	NC	—N/a	65	—N/a	—N/a
2006	32	81	70	—N/a	73	—N/a	—N/a
2009	35	NC	NC	—N/a	—	—	—

==== Team podiums ====
- 1 podium

No.	Season	Date	Location	Race	Level	Place	Teammates
1	2000–01	13 January 2001	Soldier Hollow, United States	4 × 5 km Relay C/F	World Cup	2nd	Renner / Scott / Fortier
