= Alyona Sidko =

Russian cross-country skier

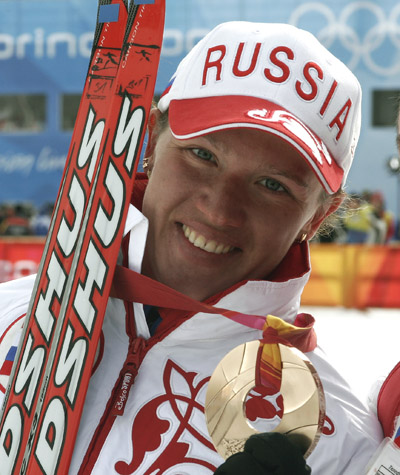

Personal information
- Nationality: Russia
- Born: 20 September 1979 (age 47) Krasnoyarsk, Soviet Union

Sport
- Sport: Skiing

World Cup career
- Seasons: 10 – (2000–2007, 2009–2010)
- Indiv. starts: 117
- Indiv. podiums: 2
- Indiv. wins: 1
- Team starts: 31
- Team podiums: 6
- Team wins: 0
- Overall titles: 0 – (20th in 2004)
- Discipline titles: 0
Medal record
Women's cross-country skiing
Representing Russia
Olympic Games
Bronze medal – third place	2006 Turin	Individual sprint
World Championships
Bronze medal – third place	2005 Oberstdorf	Team sprint

Alyona Viktorovna Sidko (Russian: Алёна Ви́кторовна Сидько́; born 20 September 1979, Krasnoyarsk) is a Russian cross-country skier who competed between 2000 and 2013.

Sidko won a bronze medal in the Individual Sprint at the 2006 Winter Olympics in Turin. She also won a bronze in the Team sprint (with Yuliya Chepalova) at the 2005 FIS Nordic World Ski Championships in Oberstdorf and had her best individual finish of 12th in the Individual sprint in 2003. Sidko has nineteen wins at various levels in distances in up to 10 km since 2002. She took the 2007–08 season off due to pregnancy but returned for the 2008–09 season.

Sidko was banned from competing at the 2010 Vancouver Olympics for breaking anti-doping rules. She had tested positive for EPO at a race in Krasnogorsk 26 December 2009 and was subsequently banned from competing in the sport for two years.

== Cross-country skiing results ==
All results are sourced from the International Ski Federation (FIS).

=== Olympic Games ===
- 1 medal – (1 bronze)

Year	Age	10 km individual	15 km skiathlon	30 km mass start	Sprint	4 × 5 km relay	Team sprint
2006	26	—	—	—	Bronze	—	6

=== World Championships ===
- 1 medal – (1 bronze)

Year	Age	10 km individual	15 km skiathlon	30 km mass start	Sprint	4 × 5 km relay	Team sprint
2005	25	—	—	—	13	—	Bronze
2007	27	—	—	27	30	7	—
2009	29	17	—	—	43	DSQ	—

=== World Cup ===
==== Season standings ====
Season	Age	Discipline standings					Ski Tour standings	
Season	Age	Overall	Distance	Long Distance	Middle Distance	Sprint	Tour de Ski	World Cup Final
2000	20	NC	—N/a	NC	NC	—	—N/a	—N/a
2001	21	101	—N/a	—N/a	—N/a	—	—N/a	—N/a
2002	22	45	—N/a	—N/a	—N/a	40	—N/a	—N/a
2003	23	25	—N/a	—N/a	—N/a	15	—N/a	—N/a
2004	24	20	29	—N/a	—N/a	16	—N/a	—N/a
2005	25	29	37	—N/a	—N/a	19	—N/a	—N/a
2006	26	23	37	—N/a	—N/a	16	—N/a	—N/a
2007	27	28	31	—N/a	—N/a	23	29	—N/a
2009	29	26	28	—N/a	—N/a	30	—	19
2010	30	100	75	—N/a	—N/a	NC	DSQ	—

==== Individual podiums ====
- 1 victory
- 2 podiums

No.	Season	Date	Location	Race	Level	Place
1	2003–04	25 October 2003	Düsseldorf, Germany	0.8 km Sprint F	World Cup	2nd
2	2005–06	30 December 2005	Nové Město, Czech Republic	1.2 km Sprint F	World Cup	1st

==== Team podiums ====
- 6 podiums – (3 RL, 3 TS)

No.	Season	Date	Location	Race	Level	Place	Teammate(s)
1	2001–02	27 November 2001	Kuopio, Finland	4 × 5 km Relay C/F	World Cup	2nd	Yegorova / Burukhina / Gavrylyuk
2	2001–02	16 December 2001	Davos, Switzerland	4 × 5 Relay C/F	World Cup	2nd	Rocheva / Burukhina / Schastlivaya
3	2002–03	14 February 2003	Asiago, Italy	6 × 1.4 km Team Sprint F	World Cup	2nd	Korostelyova
4	2003–04	26 October 2003	Düsseldorf, Germany	6 × 0.8 km Team Sprint F	World Cup	2nd	Hahina
5	2003–04	23 November 2003	Beitostølen, Norway	4 × 5 km Relay C/F	World Cup	3rd	Hahina / Vorontsova / Zavyalova
6	2005–06	23 October 2005	Düsseldorf, Germany	6 × 0.8 km Team Sprint F	World Cup	3rd	Matveyeva
