= Amanda Fortier =

Canadian cross-country skier

Personal information
- Born: 9 March 1978 (age 48) Edmonton, Alberta, Canada

Sport
- Sport: Skiing

World Cup career
- Seasons: 3 – (1999, 2001–2002)
- Indiv. starts: 19
- Indiv. podiums: 0
- Team starts: 3
- Team podiums: 1
- Team wins: 0
- Overall titles: 0 – (88th in 2002)
- Discipline titles: 0

Amanda Fortier (born 9 March 1978) is a Canadian cross-country skier. She competed in four events at the 2002 Winter Olympics.

== Cross-country skiing results ==
All results are sourced from the International Ski Federation (FIS).

=== Olympic Games ===
| Year | Age | 10 km | 15 km | Pursuit | 30 km | Sprint | 4 × 5 km relay |
|---|---|---|---|---|---|---|---|
| 2002 | 24 | — | 34 | 49 | 28 | — | 8 |

=== World Championships ===
| Year | Age | 5 km | 10 km | 15 km | Pursuit | 30 km | Sprint | 4 × 5 km relay |
|---|---|---|---|---|---|---|---|---|
| 1999 | 21 | 54 | —N/a | 51 | 45 | — | —N/a | 15 |
| 2001 | 23 | —N/a | 50 | — | 54 | CNX^{[a]} | — | — |

a. ^{1} Cancelled due to extremely cold weather.

=== World Cup ===
==== Season standings ====
| Season | Age | | | |
| Season | Age | Overall | Long Distance | Sprint |
|---|---|---|---|---|
| 1999 | 21 | NC | NC | — |
| 2001 | 23 | 89 | —N/a | NC |
| 2002 | 24 | 88 | —N/a | NC |

==== Team podiums ====
- 1 podium – (1 RL)

| No. | Season | Date | Location | Race | Level | Place | Teammates |
|---|---|---|---|---|---|---|---|
| 1 | 2000–01 | 13 January 2001 | Soldier Hollow, United States | 4 × 5 km Relay C/F | World Cup | 2nd | Renner / Thériault / Scott |
