= Kirsi Helen =

Finnish cross-country skier (born 1982)

Personal information
- Full name: Kirsi Johanna Helen
- Nationality: Finland
- Born: 6 May 1982 (age 44) Forssa, Finland

Sport
- Sport: Skiing
- Club: Noormarkun Nopsa

World Cup career
- Seasons: 9 – (2002–2005, 2007–2011)
- Indiv. starts: 52
- Indiv. podiums: 0
- Team starts: 7
- Team podiums: 0
- Overall titles: 0 – (36th in 2005)
- Discipline titles: 0
Medal record
Women's cross-country skiing
Representing Finland
Junior World Championships
Bronze medal – third place	2001 Karpacz	Individual sprint

Kirsi Helen (née Perälä, born May 6, 1982, in Forssa) is a Finnish cross-country skier who has competed since 2001. At the 2010 Winter Olympics in Vancouver, she finished 19th in the individual sprint event.

Helen also finished 23rd in the sprint event at the FIS Nordic World Ski Championships 2009 in Liberec.

Her best World Cup finish was fifth twice (2008, 2010), both in sprint events.

== Cross-country skiing results ==
All results are sourced from the International Ski Federation (FIS).

=== Olympic Games ===
Year	Age	10 km individual	15 km skiathlon	30 km mass start	Sprint	4 × 5 km relay	Team sprint
2010	27	—	—	—	19	—	—

=== World Championships ===
Year	Age	10 km individual	15 km skiathlon	30 km mass start	Sprint	4 × 5 km relay	Team sprint
2009	26	—	—	—	23	—	—

=== World Cup ===
==== Season standings ====
Season	Age	Discipline standings			Ski Tour standings		
Season	Age	Overall	Distance	Sprint	Nordic Opening	Tour de Ski	World Cup Final
2002	19	NC	—N/a	NC	—N/a	—N/a	—N/a
2003	20	66	—N/a	46	—N/a	—N/a	—N/a
2004	21	42	NC	19	—N/a	—N/a	—N/a
2005	22	36	—	17	—N/a	—N/a	—N/a
2007	24	79	—	46	—N/a	—	—N/a
2008	25	51	—	35	—N/a	—	—
2009	26	44	NC	22	—N/a	—	55
2010	27	54	—	24	—N/a	—	—
2011	28	69	—	45	DNF	—	—
