= Cross-country skiing at the FIS Nordic World Ski Championships 2009 =

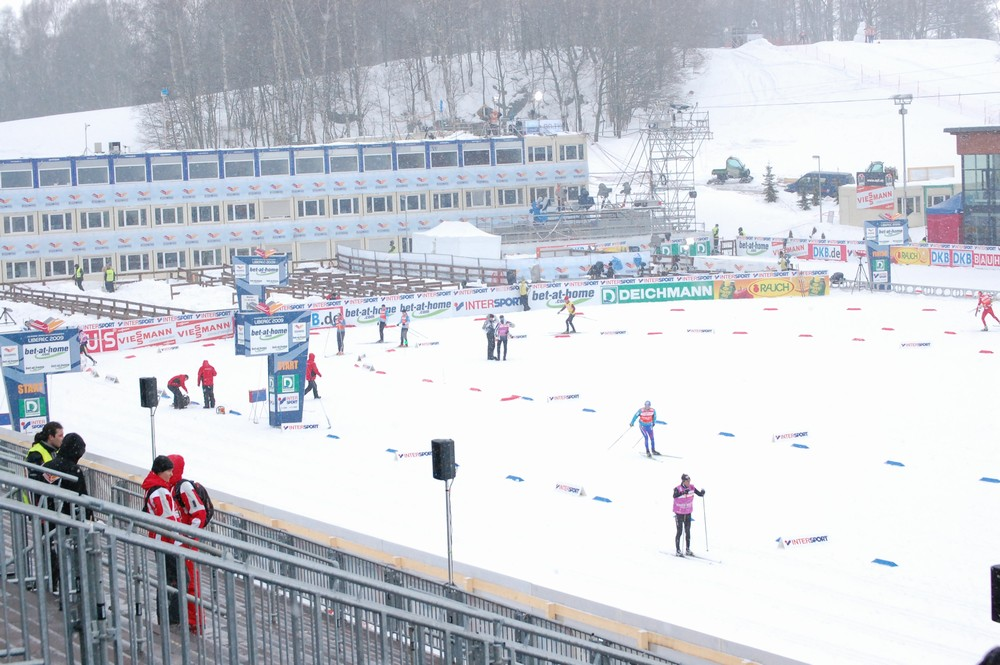
The women's 4 × 5 km relay event in action during the 2009 world championships on 26 February

At the FIS Nordic World Ski Championships 2009 in Liberec, Czech Republic, twelve cross-country skiing events were held with six for men and six for women. The format of the program was unchanged since the 2005 World Championships in Oberstdorf, Germany. For the men's events, Norway won five of the six events and a total of six medals with Petter Northug winning golds in the pursuit, 50 km and relay events. Ola Vigen Hattestad won two golds in the sprint events (individual and team). The only event the Norwegians did not win was in the 15 km event (Eldar Rønning was the highest finisher at seventh), won by Estonia's Andrus Veerpalu, who became the oldest world champion ever.

Norway won only one medal in the women's event with a silver in the pursuit event by Kristin Størmer Steira. Dario Cologna of Switzerland, the overall World Cup leader entering the championships, won no medals, with a best finish of fourth in the individual sprint event. For the women's events, the biggest winners were Finland's Aino-Kaisa Saarinen, the women's overall World Cup leader entering the championships, and Poland's Justyna Kowalczyk, the women's World Cup leader in the distance event, winning four and three medals respectively with golds in five of the six events (three for Saarinen and two for Kowalczyk). The only event not won by either Saarinen or Kowalczyk was the individual sprint which was won by Italy's Arianna Follis.

Individual sprint silver medalist Kikkan Randall became the first American woman to medal in cross-country skiing at the World Championships and the second American overall to do so (Lindsey Van had won a gold medal in the women's ski jumping individual normal hill event at the championships four days earlier). Cross country World Cup Sprint leader Petra Majdič of Slovenia won no medals, earning her best finish of ninth in the pursuit event. Nine countries won medals at the championships with Finland winning eight, Norway winning seven, and Germany and Italy each winning four medals.

== Men's events ==
=== Individual sprint freestyle ===
24 February. Jens Arne Svartedal of Norway was defending champion, but was eliminated in the quarterfinals at these championships. It was the first individual medal for all three finishers.

Medal	Athlete	Time
Gold	Ola Vigen Hattestad (NOR)	3:00.8
Silver	Johan Kjølstad (NOR)	+ 0.4
Bronze	Nikolay Morilov (RUS)	+ 1.0

=== Team sprint classical ===
25 February. Italy's Renato Pasini and Christian Zorzi were the defending champions. Zorzi did not compete, but Pasini did though he was eliminated in the semifinal round with teammate Fulvio Scola. Hattestad and Kjølstad, the gold and silver medalists in the individual sprint event the day before, teamed up to win the gold medal in the team sprint event while Jauhojärvi and Nousiainen earned their first championship medals. Germany beat Finland in a photo finish.

Medal	Team	Athletes	Time
Gold	Norway	Ola Vigen Hattestad	22:48.5
Gold	Norway	Johan Kjølstad	22:48.5
Silver	Germany	Axel Teichmann	+ 0.5
Silver	Germany	Tobias Angerer	+ 0.5
Bronze	Finland	Sami Jauhojärvi	+ 0.5
Bronze	Finland	Ville Nousiainen	+ 0.5

=== 15 km classical interval start ===
20 February. A 10 km qualification event took place on the 18th. Norway's Lars Berger was the defending champion, but could not defend his title to his involvement at the 2009 Biathlon World Championships in Pyeongchang, South Korea which was going on at the same time of the Nordic skiing world championships. The top ten finishers in the qualification event advanced to the 15 km event on the 20th. Heikkinen had the fastest time at 5 km while Bauer had the fastest time at 10 km. This was Veerpalu's third medal overall and first since the 2001 championships. The top three qualifiers from the 10 km event finished 66th, 63rd and 65th, respectively. Veerpalu is the oldest world champion ever, having turned 38 earlier that month.

10 km qualification results

Position	Athlete	Time
1	Xu Wenlong (CHN)	31:22.9
2	Jonas Thor Olsen (DEN)	+ 22.4
3	Sebastian Sørensen (DEN)	+ 34.5

Medal	Athlete	Time
Gold	Andrus Veerpalu (EST)	38:54.4
Silver	Lukáš Bauer (CZE)	+ 6.3
Bronze	Matti Heikkinen (FIN)	+ 16.4

=== 15 km + 15 km double pursuit ===
22 February. Germany's Axel Teichmann was the defending champion and would finish seventh in the event. The top three leaders at the classical part were Södergren, Sweden's Johan Olsson (he finished 16th), and Italy's Pietro Piller Cottrer (he would finish 32nd), while the fastest pit time belonged to Finland's Matti Heikkinen. Mathias Fredriksson of Sweden had the fastest time in the freestyle leg to move from 39th at the end of the classical portion to finish 17th. Northug and Södergren earned their first individual medals at the championships.

Medal	Athlete	15 km classical time	Pit time	15 km freestyle time	Finish time
Gold	Petter Northug (NOR)	38:40.1 (22)	26.2 (5)	36:46.0 (3)	1:15:52.4
Silver	Anders Södergren (SWE)	38:34.3 (1)	26.9 (8)	36:54.3 (5)	+ 3.1
Bronze	Giorgio Di Centa (ITA)	38:38.3 (16)	29.0 (tied at 29)	36:56.8 (6)	+ 11.9

=== 50 km freestyle mass start ===
1 March. Odd-Bjørn Hjelmeset of Norway was the defending champion, but did not participate due to this event being held in freestyle. The lead was different at every interval mark on the official report. At the 12.5 km mark, the three leaders were Austria's Christian Hoffman (he finished 25th), Russia's Alexander Legkov (he would finish 18th), and France's Jean Marc Gaillard (he finished 23rd). By the 20 km mark, the top three were Italy's Pietro Piller Cottrer (who would finish 11th), his teammate Christian Zorzi (would finish 12th), and Russia's Vylegzhanin. The top three at the 27.5 km mark were Zorzi, Switzerland's Curdin Perl (who would finish 27th), and his teammate Remo Fischer (who would finish 19th). With 7.5 km left in the race, the top three were Fischer, Norway's Tord Asle Gjerdalen (who would finish 20th), and 2006 Winter Olympic 50 km gold medalist Giorgio Di Centa of Italy (who would finish fourth). Northug, seventh at the 42.5 km mark, would win his third gold medal at the championships and fourth overall. It was Vylegzhanin's first world championship medal and Angerer's sixth career medal. The top 19 finishers all completed the course in under two hours while the top 22 finishers were separated by no more than 26 seconds at the finish. During the event, Angerer had to change skis.

Medal	Athlete	Time
Gold	Petter Northug (NOR)	1:59:38.1
Silver	Maxim Vylegzhanin (RUS)	+ 0.7
Bronze	Tobias Angerer (GER)	+ 2.0

=== 4 × 10 km relay ===
27 February. The Norwegian team of Eldar Rønning, Hjelmeset, Berger and Petter Northug were the defending champions and repeated for the fifth straight time with Hofstad taking Berger's spot on the relay team. Germany's Filbrich had the fastest first leg time with the top three positions at the first exchange being Germany, Canada (who would finish fifth), and Estonia (who would finish eighth). Jauhojärvi of Finland has the fastest second and in the classical style to move his country from fifth to second at the second exchange. The leader at the second exchange was Germany with Estonia being third. Italy's Pietro Piller Cottrer had the fastest third leg, moving his team from tenth to fifth (The Italians would finish fourth.) with leaders at the third exchange being Germany, Norway and Finland. France's Emmanuel Jonnier had the fastest anchor time and freestyle technique time to move the French from 12th to ninth. Norway's Northug used his leg to move past Germany to win the gold.

Medal	Team	Athletes	Time
Gold	Norway	Eldar Rønning	1:41:50.6
Gold	Norway	Odd-Bjørn Hjelmeset	1:41:50.6
Gold	Norway	Tore Ruud Hofstad	1:41:50.6
Gold	Norway	Petter Northug	1:41:50.6
Silver	Germany	Jens Filbrich	+ 2.6
Silver	Germany	Tobias Angerer	+ 2.6
Silver	Germany	Franz Göring	+ 2.6
Silver	Germany	Axel Teichmann	+ 2.6
Bronze	Finland	Matti Heikkinen	+ 43.9
Bronze	Finland	Sami Jauhojärvi	+ 43.9
Bronze	Finland	Teemu Kattilakoski	+ 43.9
Bronze	Finland	Ville Nousiainen	+ 43.9

== Women's events ==
=== Individual sprint freestyle ===
24 February. Norway's Astrid Jacobsen was the defending champion, but did not make past the qualifying round. It was Follis's first gold medal at the championships. Randall became the first American woman to medal in cross country skiing at the championships while Muranen, the 2001 champion under her maiden name Manninen, became the first woman to medal in this event twice in the championships. Fourth-place finisher Natalya Matveyeva of Russia would be banned for doping on 23 December 2009 though she had tested positive at the 2010 Winter Olympic test event at Whistler Olympic Park in Canada which were held a month prior to the world championships. The results were changed as of 20 March 2010 to show Matveyeva's doping disqualification.

Medal	Athlete	Time
Gold	Arianna Follis (ITA)	2:39.3
Silver	Kikkan Randall (USA)	+ 0.6
Bronze	Pirjo Muranen (FIN)	+ 0.7

=== Team sprint classical ===
25 February. Finland's Riitta-Liisa Roponen and Virpi Kuitunen were the defending champions. Kuitunen defended her title with Aino-Kaisa Saarinen. The Finns led at every exchange until the last rounds at the finish to win by 20 seconds. This event was Saarinen's third medal at these championships. Anna Olsson earned her first championship medal while Andersson, Longa and Follis earned their second medals at these championships.

Medal	Team	Athletes	Time
Gold	Finland	Virpi Kuitunen	19:43.7
Gold	Finland	Aino-Kaisa Saarinen	19:43.7
Silver	Sweden	Anna Olsson	+ 20.0
Silver	Sweden	Lina Andersson	+ 20.0
Bronze	Italy	Arianna Follis	+ 23.8
Bronze	Italy	Marianna Longa	+ 23.8

=== 10 km individual classical interval start ===
19 February. A 5 km qualification for this event took place on the 18th. Organizing Committee chair Katerina Neumannová of the Czech Republic is two-time defending champion, but retired after the 2006–07 season. The top ten finishers of the 5 km event advanced to the 10 km event on the 19th. Saarinen won her first individual gold medal as a follow-up to her relay gold medal at the previous championships in Sapporo, leading at all time marks. Longa and Kowalczyk both earned their first medals at the championships. The top three 5 km qualifiers, Smyth, Li and Kashiwabara, finished 51st, 55th, and did not start respectively.

5 km qualification results

Position	Athlete	Time
1	Morgan Smyth (USA)	17:24.9
2	Li Xin (CHN)	+ 4.7
3	Michiko Kashiwabara (JPN)	+ 10.2

Medal	Athlete	Time
Gold	Aino-Kaisa Saarinen (FIN)	28:12.8
Silver	Marianna Longa (ITA)	+ 4.2
Bronze	Justyna Kowalczyk (POL)	+ 11.5

=== Pursuit 7.5 km classical + 7.5 km freestyle ===
21 February. Russia's Olga Zavyalova was the defending champion though she only finished 34th at this year's championship. The top three after the classical part of the event were Saarinen, Italy's Marianna Longa, and Steira, while the top three during the pit portion were Saarinen, Longa, and Valentina Shevchenko of Ukraine. Kowalczyk and Saarinen switched medal positions from the 10 km event two days earlier.

Medal	Athlete	7.5 km classical time	Pit time	7.5 km freestyle time	Finish time
Gold	Justyna Kowalczyk (POL)	21:35.8 (4)	26.2 (4)	18:53.2 (1)	40:55.3
Silver	Kristin Størmer Steira (NOR)	21:34.9 (3)	26.7 (6)	18:55.2 (2)	+ 1.7
Bronze	Aino-Kaisa Saarinen (FIN)	21:33.7 (1)	24.5 (1)	19:05.0 (3)	+ 8.0

=== 30 km freestyle mass start ===
28 February. Finland's Kuitunen was the defending champion, but did not finish the event at this championships, having dropped out after the 15 km mark. The top three leaders at 7.5 km were Therese Johaug (who would finish fourth) and Kristin Størmer Steira (who would finish fifth) (both of Norway) and Kowalczyk. At 15 km, the top three were Steira, Johaug, and Finland's Aino-Kaisa Saarinen (who would finish seventh). At 22.5 km, the top three were Steira, Kowalczyk and Saarinen. Kowalczyk pulled away at the last 7.5 km to win her second gold medal by 8.8 seconds and third overall at the championships. Medvedeva, Shevchenko and Johaug had a fight to finish with Johaug losing the bronze by 0.6 seconds. It was Medvedeva's and Shevchenko's first individual championship medals.

Medal	Athlete	Time
Gold	Justyna Kowalczyk (POL)	1:16:10.6
Silver	Yevgeniya Medvedeva (RUS)	+8.8
Bronze	Valentyna Shevchenko (UKR)	+9.3

=== 4 × 5 km relay ===
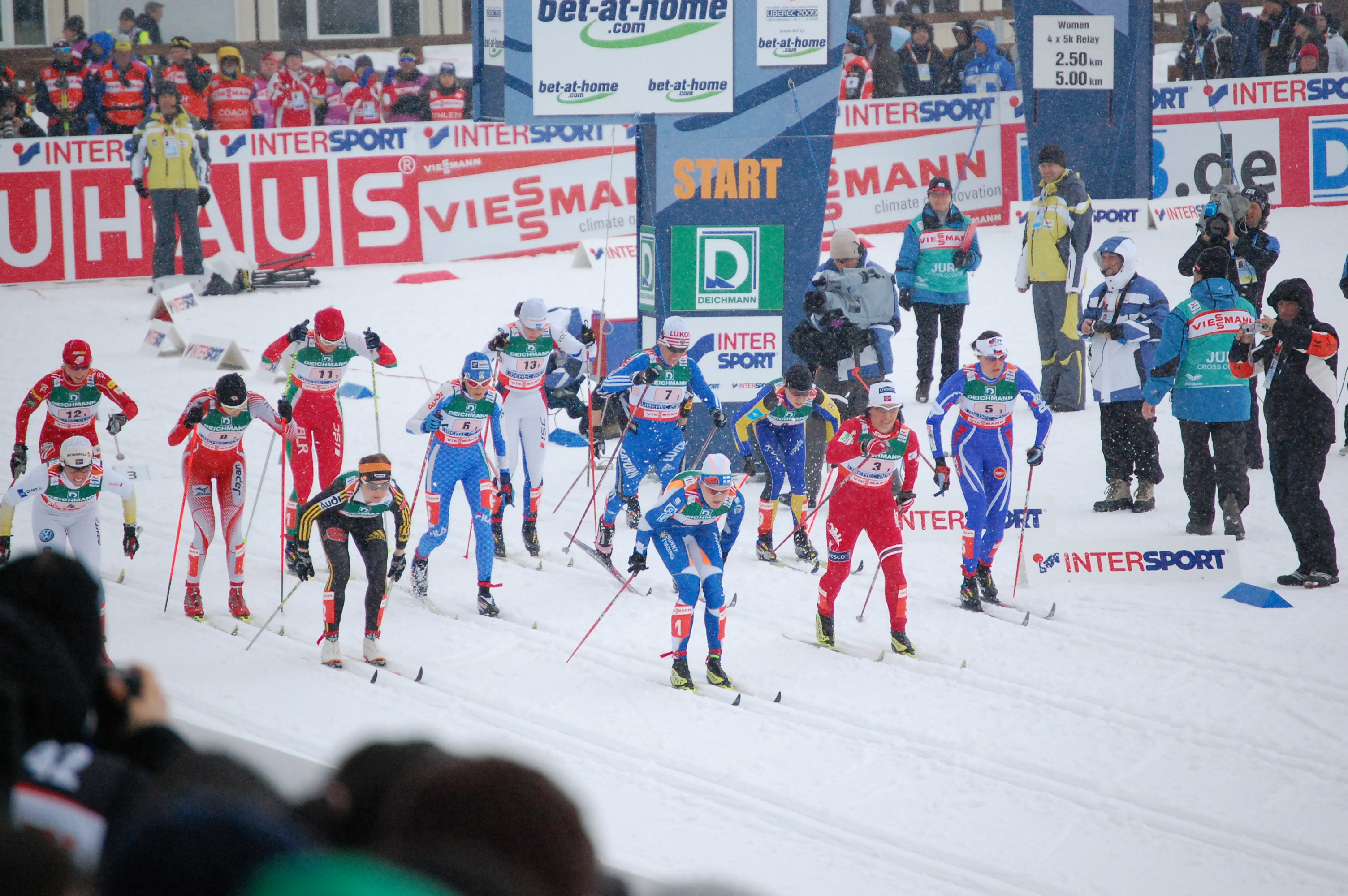
Start of the women's 4 × 5 km relay at the world championships on 26 February.

26 February. The Finnish team of Kuitunen, Aino-Kaisa Saarinen, Roponen and Pirjo Manninen (Muranen since June 2007) were the defending champions and repeated albeit in a different starting order. The top three at the first exchange with Poland (who would finish sixth), Finland and Russia (who finished eighth), with Poland's Justyna Kowalczyk having the fastest first leg. Finland's Kuitunen had the fastest time in the classical technique and the second leg to propel her team from second to first with Norway (who would finish fourth) and Japan (who finished seventh) rounding out the top three at the second exchange. Germany's Gössner had the fastest time of the third leg, moving her team from sixth to fourth. At the third exchange, the top three teams were Norway, Finland and Poland. Sweden's Kalla had the fastest time in the freestyle technique and the anchor leg to propel her team from sixth to the bronze medal, losing the silver to Germany by 0.4 seconds. Saarinen of Finland won the gold by 13.0 seconds.

Medal	Team	Athletes	Time
Gold	Finland	Pirjo Muranen	54:24.3
Gold	Finland	Virpi Kuitunen	54:24.3
Gold	Finland	Riitta-Liisa Roponen	54:24.3
Gold	Finland	Aino-Kaisa Saarinen	54:24.3
Silver	Germany	Katrin Zeller	+ 13.0
Silver	Germany	Evi Sachenbacher-Stehle	+ 13.0
Silver	Germany	Miriam Gössner	+ 13.0
Silver	Germany	Claudia Künzel-Nystad	+ 13.0
Bronze	Sweden	Lina Andersson	+ 13.4
Bronze	Sweden	Britta Norgren	+ 13.4
Bronze	Sweden	Anna Haag	+ 13.4
Bronze	Sweden	Charlotte Kalla	+ 13.4
