= Yelena Turysheva =

Russian cross-country skier

Personal information
- Nationality: Russia
- Born: January 29, 1986 (age 40) Sverdlovsk, Soviet Union

Sport
- Sport: Skiing
- Club: Ugra Svsm 2

World Cup career
- Seasons: 2 – (2009–2010)
- Indiv. starts: 16
- Indiv. podiums: 0
- Team starts: 2
- Team podiums: 0
- Overall titles: 0 – (50th in 2009)
- Discipline titles: 0

Yelena Turysheva (born January 29, 1986) is a Russian cross-country skier who has competed since 2006. She finished 35th in the individual sprint event at the 2010 Winter Olympics in Vancouver.

Turysheva's best World Cup finish was eighth in an individual sprint event in Russia in January 2010.

== Cross-country skiing results ==
All results are sourced from the International Ski Federation (FIS).

=== Olympic Games ===
Year	Age	10 km individual	15 km skiathlon	30 km mass start	Sprint	4 × 5 km relay	Team sprint
2010	24	—	—	—	35	—	—

=== World Cup ===
==== Season standings ====
Season	Age	Discipline standings			Ski Tour standings	
Season	Age	Overall	Distance	Sprint	Tour de Ski	World Cup Final
2009	23	50	58	36	—	—
2010	24	70	—	36	—	—
