= Annmari Viljanmaa =

Finnish cross-country skier

Personal information
- Nationality: Finland
- Born: 10 July 1973 (age 53) Huittinen, Finland

Sport
- Sport: Skiing
- Club: Parkanon Urheilijat

World Cup career
- Seasons: 9 – (1998–2006)
- Indiv. starts: 66
- Indiv. podiums: 1
- Indiv. wins: 0
- Team starts: 14
- Team podiums: 1
- Team wins: 1
- Overall titles: 0 – (15th in 2003)
- Discipline titles: 0

Annmari Viljanmaa (born 10 July 1973 in Huittinen) is a Finnish cross-country skier. She competed in three events at the 2002 Winter Olympics.

== Cross-country skiing results ==
All results are sourced from the International Ski Federation (FIS).

=== Olympic Games ===
Year	Age	10 km individual	15 km mass start	Pursuit	30 km mass start	Sprint	4 × 5 km relay
2002	28	37	DNF	—	24	—	—

=== World Championships ===
Year	Age	10 km	15 km	Pursuit	30 km	Sprint	4 × 5 km relay	Team sprint
2003	29	11	7	—	—	—	—	—N/a
2005	31	—	—N/a	—	19	—	—	—

=== World Cup ===
==== Season standings ====
Season	Age					
Season	Age	Overall	Distance	Long Distance	Middle Distance	Sprint
1998	24	NC	—N/a	NC	—N/a	—
1999	25	NC	—N/a	NC	—N/a	—
2000	26	58	—N/a	29	51	—
2001	27	51	—N/a	—N/a	—N/a	62
2002	28	40	—N/a	—N/a	—N/a	NC
2003	29	15	—N/a	—N/a	—N/a	17
2004	30	54	37	—N/a	—N/a	NC
2005	31	66	49	—N/a	—N/a	60
2006	32	89	63	—N/a	—N/a	—

==== Individual podiums ====
- 1 podium

No.	Season	Date	Location	Race	Level	Place
1	2002–03	8 March 2003	Oslo, Norway	30 km Individual C	World Cup	2nd

==== Team podiums ====
- 1 victory – (1 RL)
- 1 podium – (1 RL)

No.	Season	Date	Location	Race	Level	Place	Teammates
1	2002–03	1 December 2002	Rukatunturi, Finland	2 × 5 km / 2 × 10 km Relay C/F	World Cup	1st	Manninen / Palolahti / Kattilakoski
