= Doris Trachsel =

Swiss cross-country skier

Personal information
- Nationality: Switzerland
- Born: April 27, 1984 (age 42) Fribourg, Switzerland

Sport
- Sport: Skiing
- Club: SC Plasselb

World Cup career
- Seasons: 10 – (2005–2014)
- Indiv. starts: 63
- Indiv. podiums: 0
- Team starts: 7
- Team podiums: 0
- Overall titles: 0 – (68th in 2011)
- Discipline titles: 0

Doris Trachsel (born 27 April 1984) is a Swiss cross-country skier who has competed since 2001. She finished 30th in the individual sprint event at the 2010 Winter Olympics in Vancouver.

At the FIS Nordic World Ski Championships 2005 in Oberstdorf, Trachsel finished 11th in the 4 × 5 km relay and 47th in the 10 km event.

Her best World Cup finish was seventh in a 4 × 5 km relay at Italy in 2006 while her best individual finish was 16th in an individual sprint event at Canada in February 2010.

== Cross-country skiing results ==
All results are sourced from the International Ski Federation (FIS).

=== Olympic Games ===
Year	Age	10 km individual	15 km skiathlon	30 km mass start	Sprint	4 × 5 km relay	Team sprint
2010	25	—	—	—	30	—	—

=== World Championships ===
Year	Age	10 km individual	15 km skiathlon	30 km mass start	Sprint	4 × 5 km relay	Team sprint
2005	20	47	—	—	—	11	—
2011	26	33	—	—	—	—	—

=== World Cup ===
==== Season standings ====
Season	Age	Discipline standings			Ski Tour standings		
Season	Age	Overall	Distance	Sprint	Nordic Opening	Tour de Ski	World Cup Final
2005	20	99	NC	70	—N/a	—N/a	—N/a
2006	21	NC	—	NC	—N/a	—N/a	—N/a
2007	22	NC	NC	—	—N/a	—	—N/a
2008	23	NC	NC	NC	—N/a	—	—
2009	24	NC	NC	NC	—N/a	—	—
2010	25	82	NC	57	—N/a	DNF	—
2011	26	68	80	47	49	—	—
2012	27	76	77	50	39	—	—
2013	28	NC	NC	NC	36	—	—
2014	29	103	74	NC	—	—	—
