= Bjørnar Håkensmoen =

Norwegian cross-country skier

Bjørnar Håkensmoen (or Bjoernar Haakensmoen, born July 18, 1969) was the head coach of the Norwegian cross-country skiing team at the 2006 Winter Olympics. He rose to fame after offering Canadian skier Sara Renner his ski pole after hers broke during the women's team sprint event. This act of sportsmanship allowed Renner to go on to claim the silver medal with teammate Beckie Scott, edging the Norwegian entry of Ella Gjømle Berg and Marit Bjørgen into fourth place.

Canada responded to this act of kindness with many gifts and gestures, including:

- Over 600 letters, telephone calls and e-mails of thanks were received by the Norwegian Embassy in Canada.
- Canadian businessman Michael Page donated 7400 cans of maple syrup to the Norwegian Olympic Committee.
- Renner herself sent Håkensmoen a bottle of wine as a token of her appreciation.
