= Yelena Burukhina =

Russian cross-country skier

Personal information
- Nationality: Russia
- Born: 9 March 1977 (age 49) Dolgoprudny, Soviet Union

Sport
- Sport: Skiing

World Cup career
- Seasons: 10 – (1997–1998, 2000–2003, 2005–2008)
- Indiv. starts: 52
- Indiv. podiums: 2
- Indiv. wins: 0
- Team podiums: 2
- Team wins: 0
- Overall titles: 0 – (21st in 2001)
- Discipline titles: 0
Medal record
Women's cross-country skiing
Representing Russia
World Championships
Silver medal – second place	2003 Val di Fiemme	30 km freestyle
Bronze medal – third place	2003 Val di Fiemme	4 × 5 km relay
- Updated on 29 May 2019

Yelena Burukhina (born March 9, 1977) is a former Russian cross-country skier who has competed since 1996. She won two medals at the 2003 FIS Nordic World Ski Championships with a silver (30 km) and a bronze (4 × 5 km relay).

Burukina's best individual finish at the Winter Olympics was 13th in the 15 km at Salt Lake City in 2002. She has two individual career victories at 5 km (2002) and at 10 km (2005).

== Cross-country skiing results ==
All results are sourced from the International Ski Federation (FIS).

=== Olympic Games ===
Year	Age	10 km individual	15 km mass start	Pursuit	30 km	Sprint	4 × 5 km relay	Team sprint
2002	25	—	13	—	—	16	—	—N/a
2006	29	—	—N/a	37	—	—	—	—

=== World Championships ===
- 2 medals – (1 silver, 1 bronze)

Year	Age	10 km	15 km	Pursuit	30 km	Sprint	4 × 5 km relay
2001	24	—	—	—	CNX^{[a]}	6	—
2003	26	—	—	7	Silver	—	Bronze

a. ^{1} Cancelled due to extremely cold weather.

=== World Cup ===
==== Season standings ====
Season	Age	Discipline standings					Ski Tour standings	
Season	Age	Overall	Distance	Long Distance	Middle Distance	Sprint	Tour de Ski	World Cup Final
1997	20	NC	—N/a	NC	—N/a	—	—N/a	—N/a
1998	21	NC	—N/a	NC	—N/a	—	—N/a	—N/a
2000	23	65	—N/a	33	—	—	—N/a	—N/a
2001	24	21	—N/a	—N/a	—N/a	NC	—N/a	—N/a
2002	25	28	—N/a	—N/a	—N/a	46	—N/a	—N/a
2003	26	30	—N/a	—N/a	—N/a	64	—N/a	—N/a
2005	28	55	38	—N/a	—N/a	NC	—N/a	—N/a
2006	29	49	32	—N/a	—N/a	—	—N/a	—N/a
2007	30	82	58	—N/a	—N/a	—	—	—N/a
2008	31	57	33	—N/a	—N/a	—	—	—

==== Individual podiums ====
- 2 podiums

No.	Season	Date	Location	Race	Level	Place
1	2000–01	14 March 2001	Borlänge, Sweden	5 km Individual F	World Cup	2nd
2	2001–02	22 December 2001	Ramsau, Austria	15 km Mass Start F	World Cup	3rd

==== Team podiums ====
- 2 podiums

No.	Season	Date	Location	Race	Level	Place	Teammates
1	2001–02	27 November 2001	Kuopio, Finland	4 × 5 km Relay C/F	World Cup	2nd	Sidko / Yegorova / Zavyalova
2	2001–02	16 December 2001	Davos, Switzerland	4 × 5 km Relay C/F	World Cup	2nd	Sidko / Rocheva / Schastlivaya
