= Teemu Kattilakoski =

Finnish cross-country skier

Personal information
- Nationality: Finland
- Born: December 16, 1977 (age 48) Kannus, Finland

Sport
- Sport: Skiing
- Club: Alavieskan Viri

World Cup career
- Seasons: 13 – (1999–2011)
- Indiv. starts: 47
- Indiv. podiums: 0
- Team starts: 24
- Team podiums: 3
- Team wins: 1
- Overall titles: 0 – (65th in 2000)
- Discipline titles: 0
Medal record
Men's cross-country skiing
Representing Finland
World Championships
Bronze medal – third place	2009 Liberec	4 × 10 km relay

Teemu Kattilakoski (December 16, 1977 in Kannus) is a Finnish cross-country skier who has been competing since 1996. His best finish at the FIS Nordic World Ski Championships was sixth in the 4 × 10 km relay in 2007 while his best individual finish was eighth in the 50 km event in 2003.

Kattilakoski's best individual finish at the Winter Olympics was 27th in the 15 km event at Vancouver in 2010.

He has a total of four individual victories at various levels all at 10 km from 1998 to 2005.

He made an appearance in a commercial for Tide, playing one of the background civilians.

== Cross-country skiing results ==
All results are sourced from the International Ski Federation (FIS).

=== Olympic Games ===
Year	Age	15 km	Pursuit	30 km	50 km	Sprint	4 × 10 km relay	Team sprint
2002	24	—	—	35	—	—	11	—N/a
2006	28	—	—	—N/a	43	—	10	—
2010	32	27	—	—N/a	—	—	5	—

=== World Championships ===
- 1 medal – (1 bronze)

Year	Age	15 km	Pursuit	30 km	50 km	Sprint	4 × 10 km relay	Team sprint
2003	25	—	—	—	8	—	6	—N/a
2005	27	9	—	—N/a	—	—	12	—
2007	29	46	—	—N/a	—	—	6	—
2009	31	—	—	—N/a	8	—	Bronze	—
2011	33	—	—	—N/a	35	—	—	—

=== World Cup ===
==== Season standings ====
Season	Age	Discipline standings					Ski Tour standings		
Season	Age	Overall	Distance	Long Distance	Middle Distance	Sprint	Nordic Opening	Tour de Ski	World Cup Final
1999	21	NC	—N/a	NC	—N/a	—	—N/a	—N/a	—N/a
2000	22	65	—N/a	36	52	—	—N/a	—N/a	—N/a
2001	23	NC	—N/a	—N/a	—N/a	—	—N/a	—N/a	—N/a
2002	24	96	—N/a	—N/a	—N/a	NC	—N/a	—N/a	—N/a
2003	25	105	—N/a	—N/a	—N/a	—	—N/a	—N/a	—N/a
2004	26	142	100	—N/a	—N/a	—	—N/a	—N/a	—N/a
2005	27	120	78	—N/a	—N/a	—	—N/a	—N/a	—N/a
2006	28	94	63	—N/a	—N/a	NC	—N/a	—N/a	—N/a
2007	29	86	52	—N/a	—N/a	—	—N/a	—	—N/a
2008	30	77	48	—N/a	—N/a	—	—N/a	—	—
2009	31	159	99	—N/a	—N/a	—	—N/a	—	—
2010	32	121	76	—N/a	—N/a	—	—N/a	—	—
2011	33	NC	NC	—N/a	—N/a	—	—	—	—

==== Team podiums ====
- 1 victory – (1 RL)
- 3 podiums – (2 RL, 1 TS)

No.	Season	Date	Location	Race	Level	Place	Teammate(s)
1	2000–01	26 November 2000	Lahti, Finland	4 × 10 km Relay C/F	World Cup	2nd	Immonen / Kirvesniemi / Repo
2	2002–03	1 December 2002	Rukatunturi, Finland	2 × 5 km / 2 × 10 km Relay C/F	World Cup	1st	Viljanmaa / Manninen / Palolahti
3	2002–03	13 December 2002	Nové Město, Czech Republic	6 × 1.5 km Team Sprint F	World Cup	3rd	Repo
