= Cross-country skiing at the 2010 Winter Olympics – Women's sprint =

Women's sprint at the XXI Olympic Winter Games
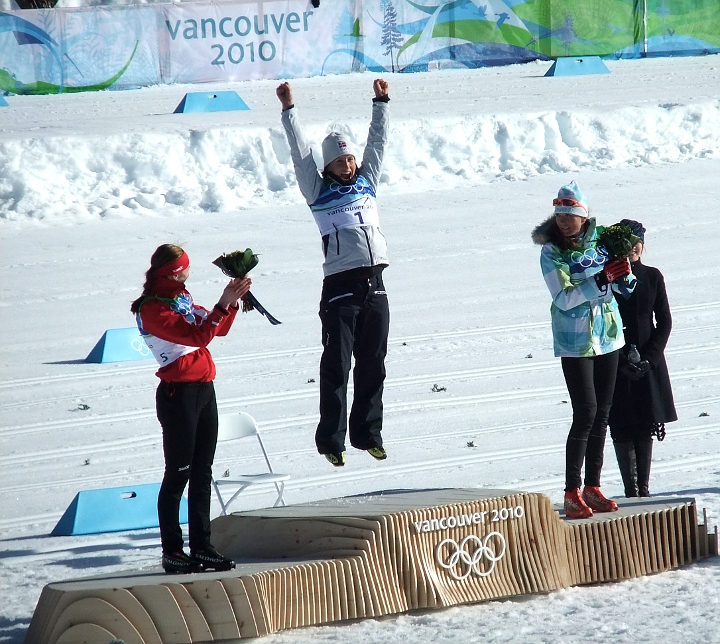
- The medalists
- Venue: Whistler Olympic Park
- Dates: 17 February 2010
- Competitors: 54 from 27 nations
- Winning time: 3:39.2

Medalists
1st place, gold medalist(s)		Marit Bjørgen	Norway
2nd place, silver medalist(s)		Justyna Kowalczyk	Poland
3rd place, bronze medalist(s)		Petra Majdič	Slovenia

The Women's sprint cross-country skiing competition in the classical technique at the 2010 Winter Olympics in Vancouver, Canada was held on 17 February at Whistler Olympic Park in Whistler, British Columbia.

Canada's Chandra Crawford was the defending Olympic champion in this event, though that event was in the freestyle technique. Italy's Arianna Follis was the defending world champion in this event which was also held in freestyle technique. Alena Procházková of Slovakia won the test event that took place at Olympic venue on 16 January 2009. The last World Cup event prior to the 2010 Games in this format took place on 6 February 2010 in Canmore, Alberta and was won by Poland's Justyna Kowalczyk.

Follis did not qualify for the event at the Winter Olympics. Crawford and Procházková were eliminated in the quarterfinals. Kowalczyk won silver. It was Bjørgen's second medal at these Olympics and first gold for her. Majdič won her first Olympic medal and the first for Slovenia in cross-country skiing. During the warm-up she crashed down a bank, into an unprotected 3 m (9.8 ft) deep gorge and landed on ice and rocks, sustaining five broken ribs and a pneumothorax. In spite of agonizing pain, she finished third in the sprint a few hours later, winning the first individual Winter Olympic medal for Slovenia in 16 years and its first ever in cross-country skiing at the Winter Olympics. She earned the highest praise from other skiers, staff and the media for her amazing bravery as she attended the medal giving ceremony with a tube in her chest to relieve pneumothorax.

== Results ==
=== Qualifying ===
Qualifying took place at 10:15 PST.

Rank	Bib	Athlete	Country	Time	Deficit	Note
1	2	Marit Bjørgen	Norway	3:38.05	+0.00	Q
2	18	Aino-Kaisa Saarinen	Finland	3:38.82	+0.77	Q
3	23	Anna Olsson	Sweden	3:41.95	+3.90	Q
4	12	Magda Genuin	Italy	3:42.18	+4.13	Q
5	17	Justyna Kowalczyk	Poland	3:43.35	+5.30	Q
6	21	Virpi Kuitunen	Finland	3:43.72	+5.67	Q
7	7	Katja Višnar	Slovenia	3:44.10	+6.05	Q
8	13	Celine Brun-Lie	Norway	3:44.71	+6.66	Q
9	22	Nicole Fessel	Germany	3:44.79	+6.74	Q
10	24	Kikkan Randall	United States	3:44.97	+6.92	Q
11	25	Astrid Jacobsen	Norway	3:45.01	+6.96	Q
12	1	Kateřina Smutná	Austria	3:45.03	+6.98	Q
13	8	Magdalena Pajala	Sweden	3:45.50	+7.45	Q
14	5	Natalya Korostelyova	Russia	3:45.56	+7.51	Q
15	20	Pirjo Muranen	Finland	3:46.04	+7.99	Q
16	6	Alena Procházková	Slovakia	3:46.16	+8.11	Q
17	27	Daria Gaiazova	Canada	3:46.97	+8.92	Q
18	47	Chandra Crawford	Canada	3:47.25	+9.20	Q
19	3	Petra Majdič	Slovenia	3:47.84	+9.79	Q
20	10	Kirsi Perälä	Finland	3:48.08	+10.03	Q
21	4	Vesna Fabjan	Slovenia	3:48.40	+10.35	Q
22	26	Madoka Natsumi	Japan	3:48.48	+10.43	Q
23	31	Aurore Cuinet	France	3:48.52	+10.47	Q
24	38	Katrin Zeller	Germany	3:48.63	+10.58	Q
25	19	Ida Ingemarsdotter	Sweden	3:49.11	+11.06	Q
26	16	Yevgeniya Shapovalova	Russia	3:49.52	+11.47	Q
27	14	Hanna Falk	Sweden	3:49.94	+11.89	Q
28	30	Maiken Caspersen Falla	Norway	3:50.23	+12.18	Q
29	33	Hanna Kolb	Germany	3:50.29	+12.24	Q
30	40	Doris Trachsel	Switzerland	3:50.85	+12.80	Q
31	28	Kaija Udras	Estonia	3:51.05	+13.00	
32	15	Oxana Jatskaja	Kazakhstan	3:51.27	+13.22	
33	37	Eva Nývltová	Czech Republic	3:51.37	+13.32	
34	43	Sara Renner	Canada	3:51.79	+13.74	
35	9	Elena Turysheva	Russia	3:51.99	+13.94	
36	35	Elena Kolomina	Kazakhstan	3:52.12	+14.07	
37	34	Triin Ojaste	Estonia	3:52.31	+14.26	
38	50	Holly Brooks	United States	3:52.51	+14.46	
39	29	Karin Moroder	Italy	3:53.74	+15.69	
40	11	Olga Rocheva	Russia	3:53.87	+15.82	
41	39	Perianne Jones	Canada	3:54.27	+16.22	
42	45	Nastassia Dubarezava	Belarus	3:56.87	+18.82	
43	32	Elisa Brocard	Italy	3:58.27	+20.22	
44	52	Monika Gyorgy	Romania	3:58.32	+20.27	
45	46	Elena Antonova	Kazakhstan	4:01.35	+23.30	
46	36	Olga Vasiljonok	Belarus	4:01.73	+23.68	
47	49	Katherine Calder	New Zealand	4:03.11	+25.06	
48	48	Marina Matrossova	Kazakhstan	4:03.14	+25.09	
49	41	Irina Terentjeva	Lithuania	4:04.47	+26.42	
50	44	Esther Bottomley	Australia	4:05.12	+27.07	
51	42	Man Dandan	China	4:08.55	+30.50	
52	51	Nina Broznić	Croatia	4:15.31	+37.26	
53	53	Kelime Çetinkaya	Turkey	4:22.32	+44.27	
54	54	Olga Reshetkova	Kyrgyzstan	4:32.96	+54.91	

=== Quarterfinals ===
Quarterfinals took place at 12:30 PST.

Quarterfinal 1

Rank	Seed	Athlete	Country	Time	Deficit	Note
1	1	Marit Bjørgen	Norway	3:35.4	+0.0	Q
2	11	Astrid Jacobsen	Norway	3:39.0	+3.6	Q
3	10	Kikkan Randall	United States	3:39.4	+4.0	LL
4	20	Kirsi Perälä	Finland	3:39.7	+4.3	
5	21	Vesna Fabjan	Slovenia	3:43.7	+8.3	
6	30	Doris Trachsel	Switzerland	3:44.7	+9.3	

Quarterfinal 2

Rank	Seed	Athlete	Country	Time	Deficit	Note
1	4	Magda Genuin	Italy	3:41.9	+0.0	Q
2	14	Natalya Korostelyova	Russia	3:42.9	+1.0	Q
3	24	Katrin Zeller	Germany	3:43.0	+1.1	
4	7	Katja Višnar	Slovenia	3:43.5	+1.6	
5	17	Daria Gaiazova	Canada	3:44.4	+2.5	
6	27	Hanna Falk	Sweden	4:22.5	+40.6	

Quarterfinal 3

Rank	Seed	Athlete	Country	Time	Deficit	Note
1	5	Justyna Kowalczyk	Poland	3:38.8	+0.0	Q
2	6	Virpi Kuitunen	Finland	3:39.9	+1.1	Q
3	25	Ida Ingemarsdotter	Sweden	3:40.0	+1.2	
4	16	Alena Procházková	Slovakia	3:40.1	+1.3	
5	15	Pirjo Muranen	Finland	3:41.7	+2.9	
6	26	Yevgeniya Shapovalova	Russia	3:43.2	+4.4	

Quarterfinal 4

Rank	Seed	Athlete	Country	Time	Deficit	Note
1	19	Petra Majdič	Slovenia	3:40.2	+0.0	Q
2	12	Kateřina Smutná	Austria	3:40.5	+0.3	Q
3	2	Aino-Kaisa Saarinen	Finland	3:40.7	+0.5	
4	9	Nicole Fessel	Germany	3:41.2	+1.0	
5	29	Hanna Kolb	Germany	3:41.6	+1.4	
6	22	Madoka Natsumi	Japan	3:42.6	+2.4	

Quarterfinal 5

Rank	Seed	Athlete	Country	Time	Deficit	Note
1	3	Anna Olsson	Sweden	3:36.5	+0.0	Q
2	13	Magdalena Pajala	Sweden	3:37.7	+1.2	Q
3	8	Celine Brun-Lie	Norway	3:39.7	+3.2	LL
4	28	Maiken Caspersen Falla	Norway	3:41.6	+5.1	
5	23	Aurore Cuinet	France	3:48.7	+12.2	
6	18	Chandra Crawford	Canada	3:50.0	+13.5	

=== Semifinals ===
Semifinals took place at 13:20 PST.

Semifinals 1

Rank	Seed	Athlete	Country	Time	Deficit	Note
1	1	Marit Bjørgen	Norway	3:39.3	+0.0	Q
2	4	Magda Genuin	Italy	3:42.2	+2.9	Q
3	11	Astrid Jacobsen	Norway	3:44.2	+4.9	
4	10	Kikkan Randall	United States	3:45.9	+6.6	
5	6	Virpi Kuitunen	Finland	3:46.4	+7.1	
6	14	Natalya Korostelyova	Russia	3:48.1	+8.8	

Semifinals 2

Rank	Seed	Athlete	Country	Time	Deficit	Note
1	5	Justyna Kowalczyk	Poland	3:38.0	+0.0	Q
2	3	Anna Olsson	Sweden	3:38.7	+0.7	Q
3	8	Celine Brun-Lie	Norway	3:40.1	+2.1	LL
4	19	Petra Majdič	Slovenia	3:41.2	+3.2	LL
5	13	Magdalena Pajala	Sweden	3:45.0	+7.0	
6	12	Kateřina Smutná	Austria	3:45.1	+7.1	

=== Final ===
Final took place at 13:45 PST.

Rank	Seed	Athlete	Country	Time	Deficit	Note
1st place, gold medalist(s)	1	Marit Bjørgen	Norway	3:39.2	+0.0	
2nd place, silver medalist(s)	5	Justyna Kowalczyk	Poland	3:40.3	+1.1	
3rd place, bronze medalist(s)	19	Petra Majdič	Slovenia	3:41.0	+1.8	
4	3	Anna Olsson	Sweden	3:41.7	+2.5	
5	4	Magda Genuin	Italy	3:49.1	+9.9	
6	8	Celine Brun-Lie	Norway	3:51.5	+12.3	

== See also ==
- Cross-country skiing at the 2010 Winter Paralympics – Women's 1 km Sprint Classic
