= Pirjo Muranen =

Finnish cross-country skier

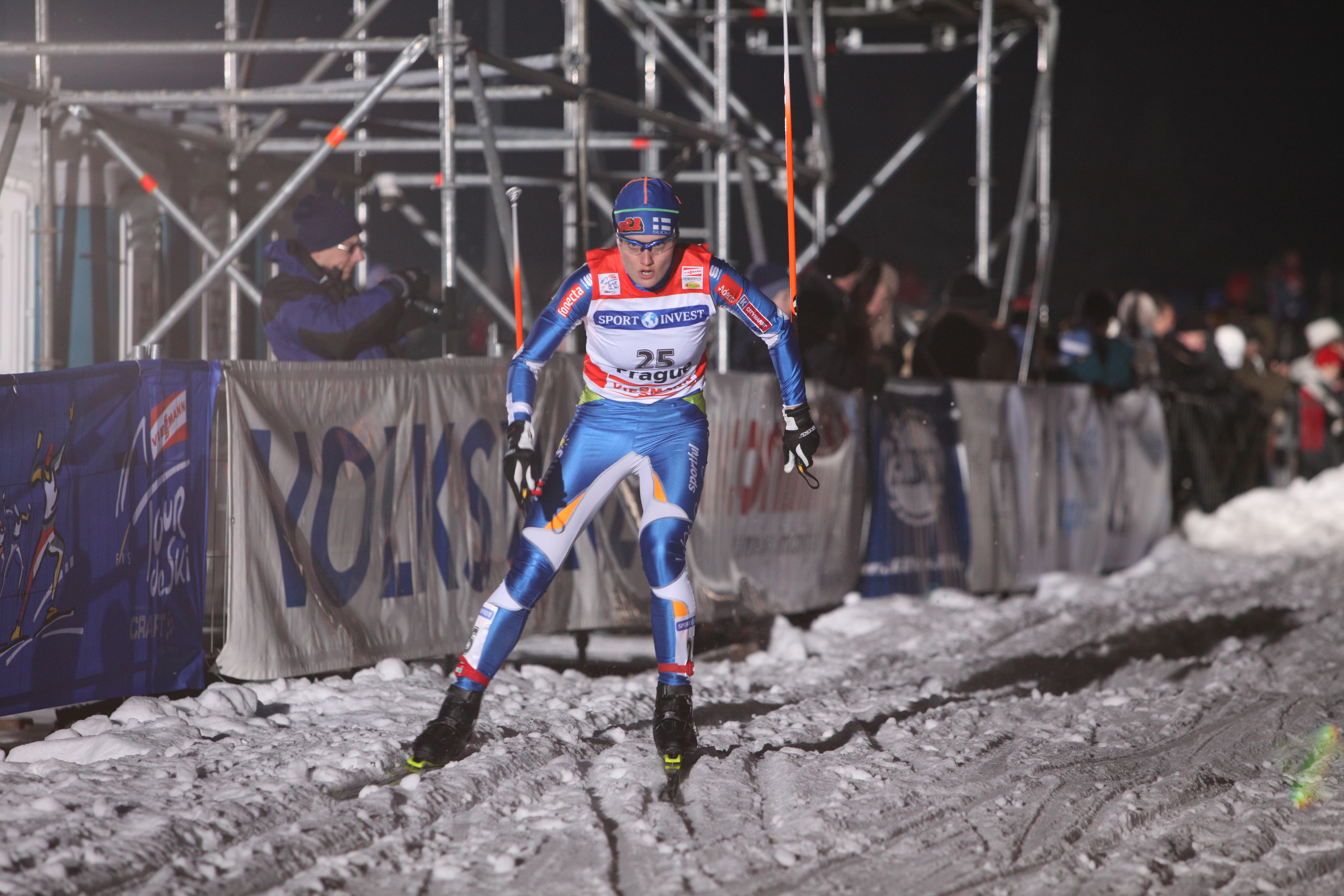
- Pirjo Muranen at Ski Sprint Prague, 2010

Personal information
- Full name: Pirjo Elina Muranen
- Nationality: Finland
- Born: 8 March 1981 (age 45) Rovaniemi, Finland

Sport
- Sport: Skiing
- Club: Ounasvaaran Hiihtoseura

World Cup career
- Seasons: 13 – (1998–2001, 2003–2011)
- Indiv. starts: 157
- Indiv. podiums: 15
- Indiv. wins: 5
- Team starts: 29
- Team podiums: 14
- Team wins: 3
- Overall titles: 0 – (7th in 2009)
- Discipline titles: 0
Medal record
Women's cross-country skiing
Representing Finland
Olympic Games
Bronze medal – third place	2010 Vancouver	4 × 5 km relay
World Championships
Gold medal – first place	2001 Lahti	Individual sprint
Gold medal – first place	2007 Sapporo	4 × 5 km relay
Gold medal – first place	2009 Liberec	4 × 5 km relay
Silver medal – second place	2005 Oberstdorf	Team sprint
Bronze medal – third place	2009 Liberec	Individual sprint
Bronze medal – third place	2011 Oslo	4 × 5 km relay
Junior World Championships
Gold medal – first place	1999 Saalfelden	4 × 5 km relay
Gold medal – first place	2000 Štrbské Pleso	Individual sprint
Gold medal – first place	2001 Karpacz	15 km freestyle
Gold medal – first place	2001 Karpacz	Individual sprint
Gold medal – first place	2001 Karpacz	4 × 5 km relay
Silver medal – second place	1998 Pontresina	4 × 5 km relay
Silver medal – second place	1999 Saalfelden	5 km classical
Silver medal – second place	2000 Štrbské Pleso	5 km freestyle
Silver medal – second place	2001 Karpacz	5 km classical
Bronze medal – third place	2000 Štrbské Pleso	15 km classical

Pirjo Muranen (née Manninen, born 8 March 1981 in Rovaniemi) is a retired Finnish cross-country skier. She won a bronze medal in the 4 × 5 km relay at the 2010 Winter Olympics in Vancouver. Muranen won five medals at the FIS Nordic World Ski Championships with three golds (Individual sprint: 2001, 4 × 5 km relay: 2007, 2009), a silver (Team sprint: 2005, with Riitta-Liisa Lassila), and a bronze (Individual sprint: 2009). She married on 30 June 2007; previously known by her maiden name of Pirjo Manninen.

Muranen also has sixteen additional victories up to 15 km from 2000 to 2002. She is the younger sister of Nordic combined skier Hannu. At the 2007 FIS Nordic World Ski Championships in Sapporo, they became the first brother-sister combination to win gold medals at the same championships.

Muranen retired from the sport in April 2011. She has then worked as a cross-country skiing pundit and studio commentator for Finland's national public-broadcasting company Yle.

== Cross-country skiing results ==
All results are sourced from the International Ski Federation (FIS).

=== Olympic Games ===
- 1 medal – (1 bronze)

Year	Age	10 km individual	15 km skiathlon	30 km mass start	Sprint	4 × 5 km relay	Team sprint
2010	28	—	30	—	21	Bronze	—

=== World Championships ===
- 6 medals – (3 gold, 1 silver, 2 bronze)

Year	Age	10 km	15 km	Pursuit	30 km	Sprint	4 × 5 km relay	Team sprint
2001	19	—	—	26	CNX^{[a]}	Gold	DSQ	—N/a
2003	21	14	—	—	18	6	DSQ	—N/a
2005	23	50	—N/a	—	—	—	—	Silver
2007	25	—	—N/a	15	—	7	Gold	—
2009	27	7	—N/a	—	10	Bronze	Gold	—
2011	29	6	—N/a	—	—	38	Bronze	—

a. ^{1} Cancelled due to extremely cold weather.

=== World Cup ===
==== Season standings ====
Season	Age	Discipline standings					Ski Tour standings		
Season	Age	Overall	Distance	Long Distance	Middle Distance	Sprint	Nordic Opening	Tour de Ski	World Cup Final
1998	16	NC	—N/a	NC	—N/a	—	—N/a	—N/a	—N/a
1999	17	80	—N/a	—	—N/a	79	—N/a	—N/a	—N/a
2000	18	22	—N/a	—	32	6	—N/a	—N/a	—N/a
2001	19	11	—N/a	—N/a	—N/a	2nd place, silver medalist(s)	—N/a	—N/a	—N/a
2003	21	16	—N/a	—N/a	—N/a	3rd place, bronze medalist(s)	—N/a	—N/a	—N/a
2004	22	32	55	—N/a	—N/a	15	—N/a	—N/a	—N/a
2005	23	21	NC	—N/a	—N/a	7	—N/a	—N/a	—N/a
2006	24	75	NC	—N/a	—N/a	46	—N/a	—N/a	—N/a
2007	25	29	38	—N/a	—N/a	25	—N/a	22	—N/a
2008	26	14	28	—N/a	—N/a	5	—N/a	15	43
2009	27	7	13	—N/a	—N/a	3rd place, bronze medalist(s)	—N/a	12	6
2010	28	31	37	—N/a	—N/a	15	—N/a	DNF	DNF
2011	29	34	41	—N/a	—N/a	17	DNF	—	DNF

==== Individual podiums ====
- 5 victories – (5 WC)
- 15 podiums – (14 WC, 1 SWC)

No.	Season	Date	Location	Race	Level	Place
1	1999–00	28 February 2000	Stockholm, Sweden	1.5 km Sprint C	World Cup	2nd
2	1999–00	8 March 2000	Oslo, Norway	1.5 km Sprint C	World Cup	2nd
3	2000–01	17 December 2000	Brusson, Italy	1.0 km Sprint F	World Cup	1st
4	2000–01	28 December 2000	Engelberg, Switzerland	1.0 km Sprint C	World Cup	2nd
5	2000–01	29 December 2000	Engelberg, Switzerland	1.0 km Sprint F	World Cup	1st
6	2000–01	7 March 2001	Oslo, Norway	1.5 km Sprint F	World Cup	1st
7	2002–03	19 December 2002	Linz, Austria	1.5 km Sprint F	World Cup	1st
8	2003–04	18 January 2004	Nové Město, Czech Republic	1.2 km Sprint F	World Cup	3rd
9	2004–05	16 January 2005	Nové Město, Czech Republic	1.2 km Sprint F	World Cup	2nd
10	2007–08	30 December 2007	Prague, Czech Republic	1.0 km Sprint F	Stage World Cup	2nd
11	2007–08	26 January 2008	Canmore, Canada	1.2 km Sprint F	World Cup	2nd
12	2008–09	31 January 2009	Rybinsk, Russia	1.3 km Sprint F	World Cup	1st
13	2008–09	13 February 2009	Valdidentro, Italy	1.4 km Sprint F	World Cup	2nd
14	2008–09	7 March 2009	Lahti, Finland	1.3 km Sprint F	World Cup	3rd
15	2009–10	11 March 2010	Drammen, Norway	1.0 km Sprint C	World Cup	3rd

==== Team podiums ====
- 3 victories – (3 RL)
- 14 podiums – (9 RL, 5 TS)

No.	Season	Date	Location	Race	Level	Place	Teammate(s)
1	2000–01	26 November 2000	Beitostølen, Norway	4 × 5 km Relay C/F	World Cup	1st	Jauho / Kuitunen / Varis
2	2000–01	9 December 2000	(Italy) Santa Caterina, Norway	4 × 3 km Relay C/F	World Cup	3rd	Salonen / Kuitunen / Jauho
3	2002–03	1 December 2002	Rukatunturi, Finland	2 × 5 km / 2 × 10 km Relay C/F	World Cup	1st	Viljanmaa / Palolahti / Kattilakoski
4	2003–04	6 March 2004	Lahti, Finland	6 × 1.0 km Team Sprint C	World Cup	2nd	Pienimäki-Hietamäki
5	2004–05	23 January 2005	Pragelato, Italy	6 × 1.2 km Team Sprint C	World Cup	3rd	Saarinen
6	2005–06	18 March 2006	Sapporo, Japan	6 × 0.8 km Team Sprint F	World Cup	2nd	Roponen
7	2006–07	4 February 2007	Davos, Switzerland	4 × 5 km Relay C/F	World Cup	3rd	Saarinen / Venäläinen / Roponen
8	2006–07	25 March 2007	Falun, Sweden	4 × 5 km Relay C/F	World Cup	3rd	Kuitunen / Roponen / Saarinen
9	2007–08	28 October 2007	Düsseldorf, Germany	6 × 0.8 km Team Sprint F	World Cup	3rd	Kuitunen
10	2007–08	25 November 2007	Beitostølen, Norway	4 × 5 km Relay C/F	World Cup	3rd	Sarasoja / Saarinen / Roponen
11	2007–08	17 February 2008	Liberec, Czech Republic	4 × 1.4 km Team Sprint C	World Cup	2nd	Saarinen
12	2008–09	23 November 2008	Gällivare, Sweden	4 × 5 km Relay C/F	World Cup	2nd	Kuitunen / Saarinen / Roponen
13	2008–09	7 December 2008	La Clusaz, France	4 × 5 km Relay C/F	World Cup	1st	Kuitunen / Roponen / Saarinen
14	2009–10	22 November 2009	Beitostølen, Norway	4 × 5 km Relay C/F	World Cup	3rd	Kuitunen / Roponen / Saarinen

== See also ==
- List of Olympic medalist families
