= Ari Palolahti =

Finnish cross-country skier

Personal information
- Nationality: Finland
- Born: 9 September 1968 (age 57) Rovaniemi, Finland

Sport
- Sport: Skiing
- Club: Alatornion Pirkat

World Cup career
- Seasons: 12 – (1987, 1995–2005)
- Indiv. starts: 77
- Indiv. podiums: 3
- Indiv. wins: 1
- Team starts: 26
- Team podiums: 4
- Team wins: 1
- Overall titles: 0 – (27th in 1998)
- Discipline titles: 0

Ari Palolahti (born 9 September 1968 in Rovaniemi) is a Finnish cross-country skier. He represented Finland at the 2002 Winter Olympics in Salt Lake City, where he competed in the 15 km and in the sprint.

== Cross-country skiing results ==
All results are sourced from the International Ski Federation (FIS).

=== Olympic Games ===
Year	Age	15 km	Pursuit	30 km	50 km	Sprint	4 × 10 km relay
2002	33	53	—	—	—	20	—

=== World Championships ===
Year	Age	15 km	Pursuit	30 km	50 km	Sprint	4 × 10 km relay
2001	32	—	—	—	32	4	—
2003	34	—	—	—	—	20	—

=== World Cup ===
==== Season standings ====
Season	Age					
Season	Age	Overall	Distance	Long Distance	Middle Distance	Sprint
1987	18	NC	—N/a	—N/a	—N/a	—N/a
1995	26	NC	—N/a	—N/a	—N/a	—N/a
1996	27	NC	—N/a	—N/a	—N/a	—N/a
1997	28	47	—N/a	52	—N/a	38
1998	29	27	—N/a	NC	—N/a	17
1999	30	50	—N/a	NC	—N/a	14
2000	31	56	—N/a	—	—	17
2001	32	49	—N/a	—N/a	—N/a	23
2002	33	57	—N/a	—N/a	—N/a	24
2003	34	39	—N/a	—N/a	—N/a	16
2004	35	73	NC	—N/a	—N/a	32
2005	36	101	—	—N/a	—N/a	51

==== Individual podiums ====
- 1 victory
- 3 podiums

No.	Season	Date	Location	Race	Level	Place
1	1997–98	10 December 1997	Milan, Italy	1.0 km Sprint F	World Cup	1st
2	1998–99	27 December 1998	Garmisch-Partenkirchen, Germany	1.0 km Sprint F	World Cup	3rd
3	2000–01	4 February 2001	Nové Město, Czech Republic	1.0 km Sprint F	World Cup	3rd

==== Team podiums ====
- 1 victory – (1 RL)
- 24 podiums – (2 RL, 2 TS)

No.	Season	Date	Location	Race	Level	Place	Teammate(s)
1	1995–96	17 March 1996	Oslo, Norway	4 × 5 km Relay F	World Cup	3rd	Repo / Vuorenmaa / Isometsä
2	1996–97	19 January 1997	Lahti, Finland	12 × 1.5 km Team Sprint F	World Cup	2nd	Räsänen
3	1997–98	11 March 1998	Falun, Sweden	10 × 1.6 km Team Sprint F	World Cup	3rd	Isometsä
4	2002–03	1 December 2002	Kuusamo, Finland	2 × 5 km / 2 × 10 km Relay C/F	World Cup	1st	Viljanmaa / Manninen / Kattilakoski
