= Belma Šmrković =

Serbian cross-country skier (born 1990)

Belma Šmrković (Serbian Cyrillic: Белма Шмрковић; born August 14, 1990, in Sjenica) is a Serbian cross-country skier who has competed since 2003. At the 2010 Winter Olympics in Vancouver, she finished 78th in the individual sprint event.

Šmrković finished 90th in the individual sprint event at the FIS Nordic World Ski Championships 2009 in Liberec.

Her lone victory was at a 5 km event in Kruševo, Macedonia in 2008.

She now works as a physics teacher in Novi Pazar, Serbia.
