= Beckie Scott =

Canadian cross-country skier (born 1974)

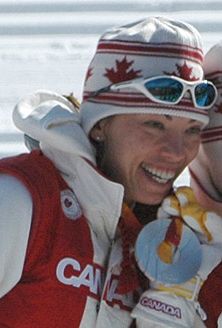

Personal information
- Full name: Rebecca Scott
- Nationality: Canada
- Born: August 1, 1974 (age 52) Vegreville, Alberta, Canada
- Height: 5 ft 7 in (1.70 m)

Sport
- Sport: Skiing
- Club: Vermilion Nordic Ski Club

World Cup career
- Seasons: 13 (1994–2006)
- Indiv. starts: 129
- Indiv. podiums: 15
- Indiv. wins: 4
- Team starts: 16
- Team podiums: 4
- Team wins: 0
- Overall titles: 0 – (2nd in 2006)
- Discipline titles: 0
Medal record
Women's cross-country skiing
Representing Canada
Olympic Games
Gold medal – first place	2002 Salt Lake City	2 × 5 km pursuit
Silver medal – second place	2006 Turin	Team sprint

Rebecca Scott OC AOE MSM (born August 1, 1974) is a Canadian retired cross-country skier. She is an Olympic gold and silver medallist, and the first Canadian to win an Olympic medal in cross-country skiing. She is the founder of a national organization dedicated to improving health, wellness and education outcomes for Indigenous youth through sport and play. Scott was Chair of the World Anti-Doping Agency (WADA) Athlete Committee, and gained notoriety for her position during the Russian (2014–2019) doping scandal. She served as an International Olympic Committee member by virtue of being elected to the IOC Athlete's Commission along with Saku Koivu between 2006 and 2014. She is married to the American former cross-country skier Justin Wadsworth. They have two children.

== Early life and education ==
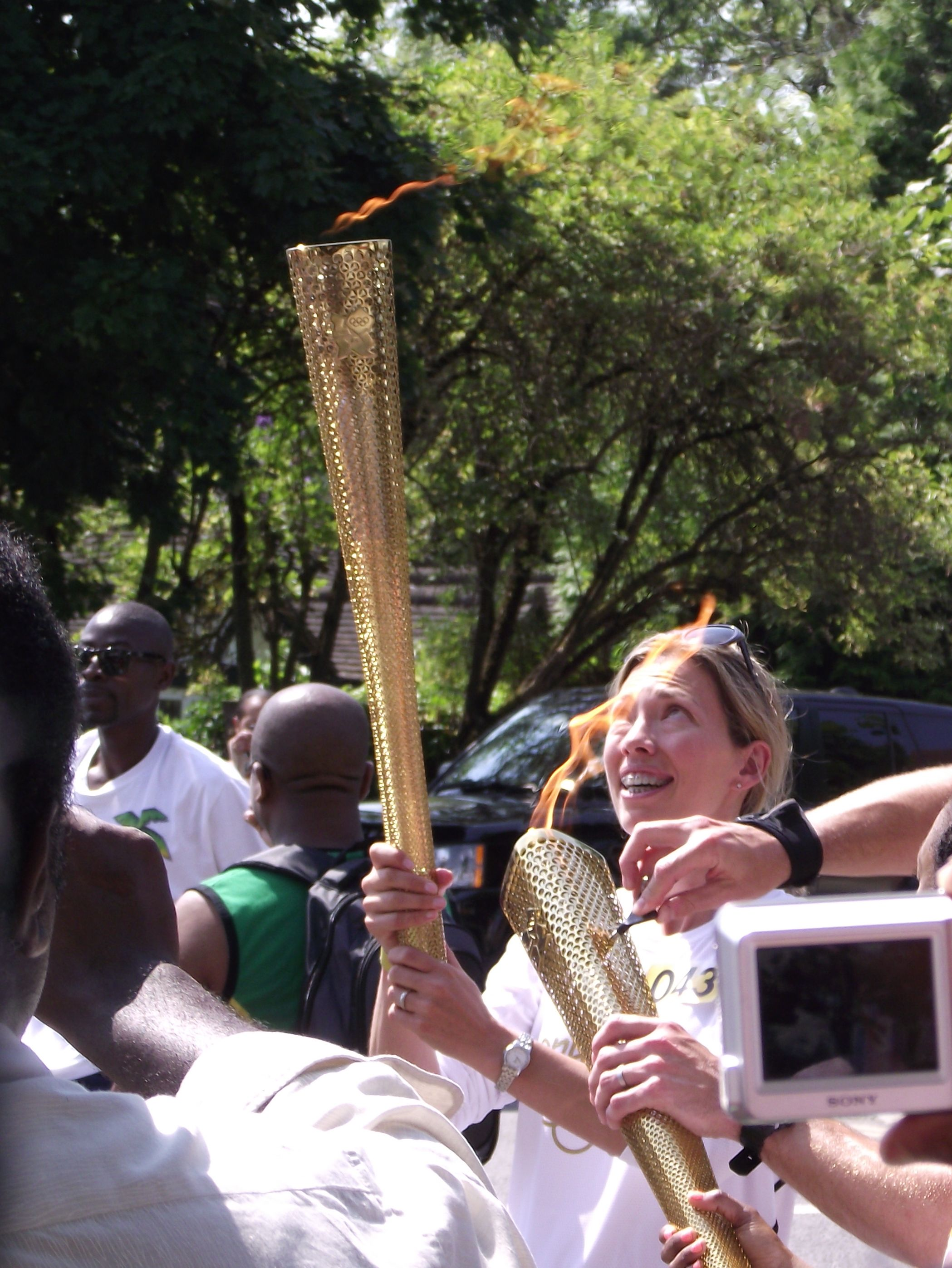
Beckie Scott during the torch relay for the 2012 Summer Olympics in London, July 2012

Scott was born on August 1, 1974, in Vegreville, Alberta, but grew up in Vermilion, Alberta. Supported by her parents, she began cross-country skiing at the age of five. She entered her first competition at age seven and attended the Junior National Championships in 1988.

== Career ==
Scott went on to win seventeen World Cup medals in individual sprints. Scott is a three-time Olympian, participating at the 1998 Winter Olympic Games in Nagano, Japan, the 2002 Winter Olympic Games in Salt Lake City, Utah, and the 2006 Winter Olympic Games in Turin, Italy. Her best-placed finish in Nagano was 45th, but Scott won a gold medal in cross-country skiing at the Salt Lake City games. She originally finished third in the 5 km pursuit, but she was upgraded to the gold medal when winner Olga Danilova and runner-up Larissa Lazutina were eventually disqualified for using darbepoetin, a performance-enhancing drug. Scott was awarded a silver medal before receiving her gold medal in June 2004, almost two and a half years after the Olympics ended. She became the first Canadian and first North American woman to win an Olympic medal in cross-country skiing.

Scott is an Officer of the Order of Canada, and has been honoured with a variety of awards in Canada. She has been inducted into the Canadian Sports Hall of Fame, the Canadian Olympic Hall of Fame, the Canadian Ski Hall of Fame, and the Alberta Sports Hall of Fame. She has a Bachelor of Arts in English from the University of Waterloo and has twice received the John Semmelink Award, for demonstrating sportsmanship and ability in international competition. She holds honorary Doctorates of Laws from the University of Alberta, Mount Royal University and the University of British Columbia. Scott was inducted into the Alberta Order of Excellence on October 17, 2019.

On March 29, 2005, Scott agreed to join the World Anti-Doping Agency's (WADA) athlete committee.

On February 23, 2006, Scott was elected as an athlete member of the International Olympic Committee along with Finnish ice hockey player Saku Koivu. Scott retired on April 12, 2006, as the most decorated Canadian cross-country skier. 2006 was also her best season, with multiple victories and podiums on the World Cup circuit, to go with her Olympic silver in one of her races in Turin, and she lost out on winning her first World Cup overall season title to the great Marit Bjørgen by the smallest margin.

In September 2012, Scott was appointed to WADA's executive committee. In September 2018, Scott resigned from the WADA compliance and review committee responsible for making a recommendation to end the Russian Anti-Doping Agency's suspension from WADA.

== Charity ==
In 2017, Scott established Spirit North, a charitable organization dedicated to improving health, wellness and education outcomes for Indigenous youth through equitable access to sport and play.

== Cross-country skiing results ==
All results are sourced from the International Ski Federation (FIS).

=== Olympic Games ===
- 2 medals – (1 gold, 1 silver)

Year	Age	5 km	10 km	15 km	Pursuit	30 km	Sprint	4 × 5 km relay	Team sprint
1998	21	47	—N/a	60	45	51	—N/a	16	—N/a
2002	25	—N/a	4	—	Gold	—	5	8	—N/a
2006	29	—N/a	DSQ	—N/a	6	—	4	10	Silver

=== World Championships ===
Year	Age	5 km	10 km	15 km	Pursuit	30 km	Sprint	4 × 5 km relay	Team sprint
1995	20	42	—N/a	40	43	—	—N/a	13	—N/a
1997	22	24	—N/a	25	27	28	—N/a	14	—N/a
1999	24	36	—N/a	53	29	—	—N/a	15	—N/a
2001	26	—N/a	—	26	11	CNX^{[a]}	9	6	—N/a
2003	28	—N/a	8	—	6	9	4	—	—N/a
2005	30	—N/a	13	—N/a	4	15	12	—	10

a. ^{1} Cancelled due to extremely cold weather.

=== World Cup ===
==== Season standings ====
Season	Age					
Season	Age	Overall	Distance	Long Distance	Middle Distance	Sprint
1994	19	NC	—N/a	—N/a	—N/a	—N/a
1995	20	NC	—N/a	—N/a	—N/a	—N/a
1996	21	NC	—N/a	—N/a	—N/a	—N/a
1997	22	50	—N/a	51	—N/a	50
1998	23	33	—N/a	43	—N/a	31
1999	24	44	—N/a	NC	—N/a	21
2000	25	15	—N/a	21	20	9
2001	26	15	—N/a	—N/a	—N/a	17
2002	27	22	—N/a	—N/a	—N/a	10
2003	28	9	—N/a	—N/a	—N/a	10
2004	29	16	23	—N/a	—N/a	6
2005	30	18	22	—N/a	—N/a	12
2006	31	2nd place, silver medalist(s)	3rd place, bronze medalist(s)	—N/a	—N/a	2nd place, silver medalist(s)

==== Individual podiums ====
- 4 victories
- 15 podiums

No.	Season	Date	Location	Race	Level	Place
1	2000–01	14 January 2001	Soldier Hollow, United States	1.0 km Sprint F	World Cup	3rd
2	2001–02	19 December 2001	Asiago, Italy	1.5 km Sprint F	World Cup	3rd
3	2002–03	19 December 2002	Linz, Austria	1.0 km Sprint F	World Cup	3rd
4	2002–03	15 February 2003	Asiago, Italy	5 km Individual C	World Cup	2nd
5	2002–03	20 March 2003	Borlänge, Sweden	1.0 km Sprint F	World Cup	3rd
6	2003–04	12 March 2004	Pragelato, Italy	1.0 km Sprint F	World Cup	2nd
7	2005–06	10 December 2005	Vernon, Canada	7.5 km + 7.5 km Skiathlon C/F	World Cup	2nd
8	2005–06	11 December 2005	Vernon, Canada	1.5 km Sprint F	World Cup	1st
9	2005–06	15 December 2005	Canmore, Canada	10 km Individual F	World Cup	2nd
10	2005–06	17 December 2005	Canmore, Canada	15 km Mass Start C	World Cup	1st
11	2005–06	21 January 2006	Oberstdorf, Germany	7.5 km + 7.5 km Skiathlon C/F	World Cup	1st
12	2005–06	8 March 2006	Falun, Sweden	5 km + 5 km Skiathlon C/F	World Cup	3rd
13	2005–06	9 March 2006	Drammen, Norway	1.0 km Sprint C	World Cup	2nd
14	2005–06	15 March 2006	Changchun, China	1.0 km Sprint F	World Cup	2nd
15	2005–06	19 March 2006	Sapporo, Japan	7.5 km + 7.5 km Skiathlon C/F	World Cup	1st

==== Team podiums ====
- 2 podiums – (1 RL, 1 TS)

No.	Season	Date	Location	Race	Level	Place	Teammate(s)
1	2000–01	13 January 2001	Soldier Hollow, United States	4 × 5 km Relay C/F	World Cup	2nd	Renner / Thériault / Fortier
2	2005–06	18 December 2005	Canmore, Canada	6 × 1.2 km Team Sprint C	World Cup	2nd	Renner

== See also ==
- List of University of Waterloo people
