= Sebastian Sørensen =

Danish cross-country skier (born 1984)

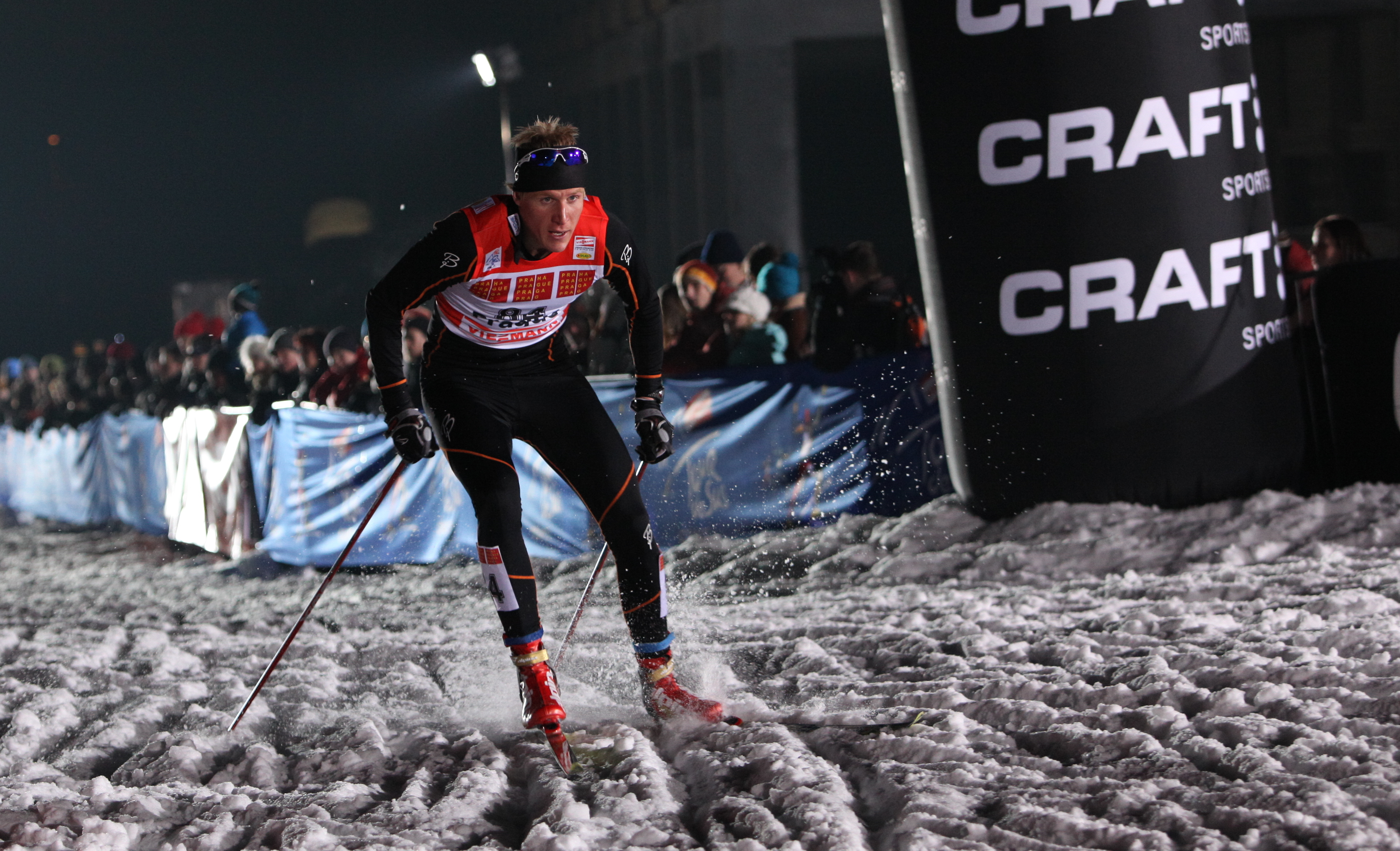
Sebastian Sørensen competing in Prague in 2010

Sebastian Sørensen (born 14 August 1984) is a Danish cross-country skier who has competed since 2002. He finished third in the 10 km qualification for the FIS Nordic World Ski Championships 2009 in Liberec, Czech Republic.

At the FIS Nordic World Ski Championships 2005 in Oberstdorf, Sørensen finished 20th in the 4 x 10 km relay had his best individual finish of 63rd in the individual sprint event.

His best World Cup finish was 65th in the individual sprint at Gothenburg, Sweden in 2005.
