= Kirsi Peltonen =

Finnish mathematician

- Education: University of Helsinki
- Occupation: Mathematician

Kirsi Peltonen is a Finnish mathematician whose research interests include differential geometry and the connections between mathematics and art. She is a Senior University Lecturer in the Department of Mathematics and Systems Analysis at Aalto University, and a docent at the University of Helsinki. Her work has included the design of an innovative interdisciplinary course on mathematics, art, and architecture, the creation of a major exhibit at the Heureka science center near Helsinki, and presentations on mathematics at Finnish schools.

Peltonen earned her Ph.D. in 1992, at the University of Helsinki. Her dissertation, On the Existence of Quasiregular Mappings, was supervised by Seppo Rickman.

In 2015, Peltonen was the inaugural lecturer for a series of lectures titled Women in Mathematics in Finland and sponsored by European Women in Mathematics.

In 2018 the Finnish Mathematics Society awarded their annual mathematics prize to Peltonen, for her work on mathematics and art.
