= FIS Nordic World Ski Championships 2009 – Women's sprint =

Women's sprint at the FIS Nordic World Ski Championships 2009
- Venue: Liberec
- Date: 24 February 2009
- Competitors: 97 from 42 nations

Medalists
gold medal	Arianna Follis	Italy
silver medal	Kikkan Randall	United States
bronze medal	Pirjo Muranen	Finland

The women's sprint cross-country skiing competition at the FIS Nordic World Ski Championships 2009 was held on 24 February 2009. The Sprint qualifying began at 11:35 CET with finals at 13:30 CET. The defending world champion was Norway's Astrid Uhrenholdt Jacobsen, but she was eliminated in the qualification round at these championships. It was the first individual gold medal for Arianna Follis.

== Results ==
=== Qualification ===
Rank	Bib	Athlete	Country	Time	Deficit	Note
1	23	Arianna Follis	Italy	2:47.42	—	Q
2	26	Pirjo Muranen	Finland	2:47.92	+0.50	Q
3	10	Charlotte Kalla	Sweden	2:48.57	+1.15	Q
4	18	Marthe Kristoffersen	Norway	2:48.82	+1.40	Q
5	22	Vesna Fabjan	Slovenia	2:49.71	+2.29	Q
6	38	Kikkan Randall	USA	2:50.19	+2.77	Q
7	1	Olga Vasiljonok	Belarus	2:50.50	+3.08	Q
8	41	Claudia Nystad	Germany	2:50.55	+3.13	Q
9	24	Ida Ingemarsdotter	Sweden	2:50.61	+3.19	Q
10	42	Natalya Korostelyova	Russia	2:50.73	+3.31	Q
11	40	Anna Olsson	Sweden	2:50.79	+3.37	Q
12	37	Alena Procházková	Slovakia	2:51.89	+4.47	Q
13	12	Riikka Sarasoja	Finland	2:51.92	+4.50	Q
14	39	Marit Bjørgen	Norway	2:51.97	+4.55	Q
15	6	Kaija Udras	Estonia	2:51.98	+4.56	Q
16	95	Miriam Gössner	Germany	2:51.99	+4.57	Q
17	43	Laure Barthélémy	France	2:52.32	+4.90	Q
18	29	Petra Majdič	Slovenia	2:52.35	+4.93	Q
19	30	Celine Brun-Lie	Norway	2:52.37	+4.95	Q
20	31	Kirsi Perälä	Finland	2:52.46	+5.04	Q
21	17	Manuela Henkel	Germany	2:52.83	+5.41	Q
22	21	Magda Genuin	Italy	2:53.13	+5.71	Q
23	14	Aurore Cuinet	France	2:53.32	+5.90	Q
24	15	Katja Višnar	Slovenia	2:53.36	+5.94	Q
25	34	Riitta-Liisa Roponen	Finland	2:53.37	+5.95	Q
26	25	Nicole Fessel	Germany	2:53.58	+6.16	Q
27	19	Madoka Natsumi	Japan	2:54.06	+6.64	Q
28	4	Daria Gaiazova	Canada	2:54.26	+6.84	Q
29	7	Caroline Weibel	France	2:54.27	+6.85	Q
30	3	Sylwia Jaśkowiec	Poland	2:54.34	+6.92	
31	59	Vita Yakymchuk	Ukraine	2:54.38	+6.96	
32	8	Elisa Brocard	Italy	2:55.50	+8.08	
33	9	Kaili Sirge	Estonia	2:55.54	+8.12	
34	20	Astrid Uhrenholdt Jacobsen	Norway	2:55.76	+8.34	
35	27	Natalya Naryshkina	Russia	2:56.00	+8.58	
36	45	Triin Ojaste	Estonia	2:56.22	+8.80	
37	16	Seraina Mischol	Switzerland	2:56.31	+8.89	
38	35	Britta Johansson Norgren	Sweden	2:56.33	+8.91	
39	32	Maiken Caspersen Falla	Norway	2:56.35	+8.93	
39	60	Elizabeth Stephen	USA	2:56.35	+8.93	
41	46	Laura Valaas	USA	2:56.71	+9.29	
42	2	Viktoria Lopatina	Belarus	2:57.41	+9.99	
43	36	Alyona Sidko	Russia	2:57.46	+10.04	
44	11	Nobuko Fukuda	Japan	2:57.75	+10.33	
45	67	Michito Kashiwabara	Japan	2:57.85	+10.43	
46	5	Eva Nývltová	Czech Republic	2:57.92	+10.50	
47	49	Maryna Antsybor	Ukraine	2:59.02	+11.60	
48	28	Karin Moroder	Italy	2:59.06	+11.64	
49	64	Song Bo	China	2:59.26	+11.84	
50	57	Helena Erbenová	Czech Republic	2:59.40	+11.98	
51	48	Oxana Yatskaya	Kazakhstan	2:59.49	+12.07	
52	47	Morgan Smyth	USA	2:59.87	+12.45	
53	55	Irina Terentjeva	Lithuania	3:00.51	+13.09	
54	13	Perianne Jones	Canada	3:00.52	+13.10	
55	52	Dandan Man	China	3:01.14	+13.72	
56	56	Katarina Garajova	Slovakia	3:01.69	+14.27	
57	54	Yingcui E	China	3:02.19	+14.77	
58	50	Esther Bottomley	Australia	3:02.68	+15.26	
59	58	Elena Kolomina	Kazakhstan	3:03.02	+15.60	
60	62	Nastassia Dubarezava	Belarus	3:03.64	+16.22	
61	66	Kateryna Grygorenko	Ukraine	3:03.76	+16.34	
62	44	Shayla Swanson	Canada	3:04.14	+16.72	
63	61	Tatyana Roshchina	Kazakhstan	3:05.16	+17.74	
64	63	Katherine Calder	New Zealand	3:05.29	+17.87	
65	53	Barbara Jezeršek	Slovenia	3:05.50	+18.08	
66	51	Kornelia Marek	Poland	3:06.23	+18.81	
67	72	Teodora Malcheva	Bulgaria	3:08.31	+20.89	
68	69	Mónika György	Romania	3:09.38	+21.96	
69	68	Dina Ussina	Kazakhstan	3:10.97	+23.55	
70	81	Olga Reshetkova	Kyrgyzstan	3:11.68	+24.26	
71	73	Lada Nesterenko	Ukraine	3:12.62	+25.20	
72	71	Katarina Johansen	Slovakia	3:12.67	+25.25	
73	70	Kelime Çetinkaya	Turkey	3:13.79	+26.37	
74	75	Antonia Grigorova-Burgova	Bulgaria	3:14.71	+27.29	
75	79	Chae-Won Lee	South Korea	3:14.96	+27.54	
76	84	Jaquelin Mourao	Brazil	3:17.17	+29.75	
77	77	Vedrana Malec	Croatia	3:18.29	+30.87	
78	82	Anete Brice	Latvia	3:19.26	+31.84	
79	76	Andrea Fancy	New Zealand	3:22.52	+35.10	
80	74	Sarah Young	United Kingdom	3:22.94	+35.52	
81	90	Vera Viczián	Hungary	3:23.09	+35.67	
82	80	Maria Danou	Greece	3:25.51	+38.09	
83	88	Rosana Kiroska	Macedonia	3:29.20	+41.78	
84	96	Alexandra Camenșcic	Moldova	3:29.22	+41.80	
85	78	Fiona Hughes	United Kingdom	3:29.62	+42.20	
86	93	Tanja Karišik	Bosnia and Herzegovina	3:33.35	+45.93	
87	94	Kitti Szoelloesi	Hungary	3:33.88	+46.46	
88	92	Julia Zamyatina	Kyrgyzstan	3:39.99	+52.57	
89	83	Erdene-Ochiryn Ochirsüren	Mongolia	3:51.81	+1:04.39	
90	85	Belma Smrkovic	Serbia	3:52.37	+1:04.95	
91	87	Mirlene Picin	Brazil	3:54.56	+1:07.14	
92	89	Ana Angelova	Macedonia	3:59.20	+1:11.78	
93	86	Otgontsetseg Chinbat	Mongolia	4:11.52	+1:24.10	
94	97	Qristine Khachatryan	Armenia	4:20.05	+1:32.63	
95	91	Bhuwneshwari Thakur	India	4:58.24	+2:10.82	
—	65	Laura Orgué	Spain	DNS		
—	33	Natalya Matveyeva	Russia	DSQ		

=== Quarterfinals ===
Q - Qualified for next round
PF - Photo Finish
LL - Lucky Loser - qualified for next round due to their times

Quarterfinal 1

Rank	Seed	Athlete	Country	Time	Deficit	Note
1	1	Natalya Matveyeva	Russia		—	Q
2	10	Ida Ingemarsdotter	Sweden			Q
3	11	Natalya Korostelyova	Russia			LL
4	20	Celine Brun-Lie	Norway			LL
5	21	Kirsi Perälä	Finland			23rd
6	30	Caroline Weibel	France			29th

Quarterfinal 2

Rank	Seed	Athlete	Country	Time	Deficit	Note
1	4	Charlotte Kalla	Sweden		—	Q
2	7	Kikkan Randall	USA			Q
3	27	Nicole Fessel	Germany			15th
4	17	Miriam Gössner	Germany			19th
5	14	Riikka Sarasoja	Finland			20th
6	24	Aurore Cuinet	France			25th

Quarterfinal 3

Rank	Seed	Athlete	Country	Time	Deficit	Note
1	5	Marthe Kristoffersen	Norway		—	Q
2	15	Marit Bjørgen	Norway			Q
3	26	Riitta-Liisa Roponen	Finland			14th
4	6	Vesna Fabjan	Slovenia			16th
5	16	Kaija Udras	Estonia			21st
6	25	Katja Višnar	Slovenia			26th

Quarterfinal 4

Rank	Seed	Athlete	Country	Time	Deficit	Note
1	2	Arianna Follis	Italy		—	Q
2	12	Anna Olsson	Sweden			Q
3	19	Petra Majdič	Slovenia			12th
4	9	Claudia Nystad	Germany			18th
5	22	Manuela Henkel	Germany			24th
6	29	Daria Gaiazova	Canada			28th

Quarterfinal 5

Rank	Seed	Athlete	Country	Time	Deficit	Note
1	3	Pirjo Muranen	Finland		—	Q
2	13	Alena Procházková	Slovakia			Q
3	23	Magda Genuin	Italy			13th
4	8	Olga Vasiljonok	Belarus			17th
5	18	Laure Barthélémy	France			22nd
6	28	Madoka Natsumi	Japan			27th

=== Semifinals ===
Semifinal 1

Rank	Seed	Athlete	Country	Time	Deficit	Note
1	7	Kikkan Randall	USA	2:43.2	—	QA
2	1	Natalya Matveyeva	Russia	2:43.7	+0.5	QA
3	10	Ida Ingemarsdotter	Sweden	2:43.7	+0.5	QA LL
5	15	Marit Bjørgen	Norway	2:47.0	+3.8	QB
6	4	Charlotte Kalla	Sweden	2:47.3	+4.1	QB

Semifinal 2

Rank	Seed	Athlete	Country	Time	Deficit	Note
1	2	Arianna Follis	Italy	2:44.2	—	QA
2	3	Pirjo Muranen	Finland	2:44.6	+0.4	QA
3	12	Anna Olsson	Sweden	2:45.1	+0.9	QA LL
4	5	Marthe Kristoffersen	Norway	2:46.2	+2.0	QB
5	13	Alena Procházková	Slovakia	2:49.5	+5.3	QB
6	11	Natalya Korostelyova	Russia	2:51.8	+7.6	QB

=== Finals ===
Final A

Rank	Seed	Athlete	Country	Time	Deficit	Note
1st place, gold medalist(s)	2	Arianna Follis	Italy		—	1st
2nd place, silver medalist(s)	7	Kikkan Randall	USA			2nd
3rd place, bronze medalist(s)	3	Pirjo Muranen	Finland			3rd
4	10	Ida Ingemarsdotter	Sweden			4th
5	12	Anna Olsson	Sweden			5th
—	1	Natalya Matveyeva	Russia	DSQ		

Final B

Rank	Seed	Athlete	Country	Time	Deficit	Note
1	4	Charlotte Kalla	Sweden		—	6th
2	13	Alena Procházková	Slovakia			7th
3	5	Marthe Kristoffersen	Norway			8th
4	15	Marit Bjørgen	Norway			9th
5	11	Natalya Korostelyova	Russia			10th
6	20	Celine Brun-Lie	Norway			11th
