= 2002–03 FIS Cross-Country World Cup =

Cross-country skiing competition

Discipline	Men	Women
Overall	(Sweden) Mathias Fredriksson	(Norway) Bente Skari (4th title)
Distance	(not arranged)	(not arranged)
Sprint	(Sweden) Thobias Fredriksson	(Norway) Marit Bjørgen
Nations Cup	Sweden	Norway
- Nations Cup Overall: Norway

Competition
Locations	19 venues	19 venues
Individual	21 events	21 events
Relay/Team	6 events	6 events

The 2002–03 FIS Cross-Country World Cup was the 22nd official World Cup season in cross-country skiing for men and women. The season began in Düsseldorf, Germany, on 26 October on 2002 and was concluded in Falun, Sweden, on 23 March 2003. Mathias Fredriksson of Sweden won the overall men's cup, and Bente Skari of Norway won the women's.

== Calendar ==
=== Men ===
Key: C – Classic / F – Freestyle
WC	Date	Place	Discipline	Winner	Second	Third	Yellow bib	Ref.
1	26 October 2002	(Germany) Düsseldorf	Sprint F	(Sweden) Peter Larsson	(Sweden) Thobias Fredriksson	(Norway) Tor Arne Hetland	(Sweden) Peter Larsson	
2	23 November 2002	(Sweden) Kiruna	10 km F	(France) Vincent Vittoz	(Italy) Pietro Piller Cottrer	(Italy) Fulvio Valbusa	(Norway) Tor Arne Hetland	
3	30 November 2002	(Finland) Ruka	15 km C	(Russia) Vasily Rochev	(Czech Republic) Lukáš Bauer	(Germany) Axel Teichmann	(Russia) Vasily Rochev	
4	7 December 2002	(Switzerland) Davos	15 km F	(Sweden) Mathias Fredriksson	(France) Vincent Vittoz	(Italy) Fulvio Valbusa	(France) Vincent Vittoz	
5	11 December 2002	(Italy) Clusone	Sprint F	(Norway) Tor Arne Hetland	(Germany) René Sommerfeldt	(Sweden) Anders Högberg	(Germany) René Sommerfeldt	
6	14 December 2002	(Italy) Cogne	30 km C Mass Start	(Norway) Frode Estil	(Norway) Anders Aukland	(Sweden) Mathias Fredriksson	(Sweden) Mathias Fredriksson	
7	15 December 2002	(Italy) Cogne	Sprint C	(Norway) Tor Arne Hetland	(Finland) Lauri Pyykönen	(Norway) Jens Arne Svartedal	(Norway) Tor Arne Hetland	
8	19 December 2002	(Austria) Linz	Sprint F	(Sweden) Mikael Östberg	(Sweden) Thobias Fredriksson	(Italy) Cristian Zorzi	(Norway) Tor Arne Hetland	
9	21 December 2002	(Austria) Ramsau	10 km C + 10 km F Double Pursuit	(Germany) Axel Teichmann	(Sweden) Anders Södergren	(Germany) Tobias Angerer	(Norway) Tor Arne Hetland	
10	4 January 2003	(Russia) Kavgolovo	10 km F	(Germany) René Sommerfeldt	(Sweden) Mathias Fredriksson	(Germany) Axel Teichmann	(Germany) René Sommerfeldt	
11	12 January 2003	(Estonia) Otepää	30 km C Mass Start	(Sweden) Jörgen Brink	(Norway) Anders Aukland	(Estonia) Andrus Veerpalu	(Germany) René Sommerfeldt	
12	18 January 2003	(Czech Republic) Nové Město	15 km F	(Czech Republic) Lukáš Bauer	(Austria) Christian Hoffmann	(Sweden) Per Elofsson	(Germany) René Sommerfeldt	
13	25 January 2003	(Germany) Oberhof	15 km C Mass Start	(Sweden) Mathias Fredriksson	(Switzerland) Reto Burgermeister	(Norway) Frode Estil	(Sweden) Mathias Fredriksson	
14	12 February 2003	(Germany) Reit im Winkl	Sprint F	(Italy) Cristian Zorzi	(Sweden) Jörgen Brink	(Germany) Tobias Angerer	(Sweden) Mathias Fredriksson	
15	15 February 2003	(Italy) Asiago	10 km C	(Estonia) Andrus Veerpalu	(Norway) Frode Estil	(Italy) Fulvio Valbusa	(Sweden) Mathias Fredriksson	
FIS Nordic World Ski Championships 2003 (22 February – 5 March)
16	6 March 2003	(Norway) Oslo	Sprint C	(Norway) Håvard Bjerkeli	(Finland) Lauri Pyykönen	(Sweden) Thobias Fredriksson	(Sweden) Mathias Fredriksson	
17	8 March 2003	(Norway) Oslo	50 km C	(Estonia) Andrus Veerpalu	(Norway) Anders Aukland	(Russia) Andrey Noutrikhin	(Sweden) Mathias Fredriksson	
18	11 March 2003	(Norway) Drammen	Sprint C	(Norway) Jens Arne Svartedal	(Finland) Keijo Kurttila	(Sweden) Thobias Fredriksson	(Sweden) Mathias Fredriksson	
19	16 March 2003	(Finland) Lahti	15 km F	(Sweden) Mathias Fredriksson	(Czech Republic) Lukáš Bauer	(Italy) Pietro Piller Cottrer	(Sweden) Mathias Fredriksson	
20	20 March 2003	(Sweden) Borlänge	Sprint F	(Sweden) Thobias Fredriksson	(Sweden) Peter Larsson	(Italy) Cristian Zorzi	(Sweden) Mathias Fredriksson	
21	22 March 2003	(Sweden) Falun	10 km C + 10 km F Double Pursuit	(Sweden) Mathias Fredriksson	(Norway) Frode Estil	(Sweden) Jörgen Brink	(Sweden) Mathias Fredriksson	

=== Women ===
Key: C – Classic / F – Freestyle
WC	Date	Place	Discipline	Winner	Second	Third	Yellow bib	Ref.
1	26 October 2002	(Germany) Düsseldorf	Sprint F	(Norway) Marit Bjørgen	(Italy) Gabriella Paruzzi	(Norway) Anita Moen	(Norway) Marit Bjørgen	
2	23 November 2002	(Sweden) Kiruna	5 km F	(Germany) Evi Sachenbacher (Estonia) Kristina Šmigun		(Germany) Claudia Künzel	(Germany) Evi Sachenbacher	
3	30 November 2002	(Finland) Ruka	10 km C	(Norway) Bente Skari	(Estonia) Kristina Šmigun	(Russia) Lilia Vasilieva	(Estonia) Kristina Šmigun	
4	7 December 2002	(Switzerland) Davos	10 km F	(Norway) Bente Skari	(Estonia) Kristina Šmigun	(Italy) Gabriella Paruzzi	(Estonia) Kristina Šmigun	
5	11 December 2002	(Italy) Clusone	Sprint F	(Norway) Marit Bjørgen	(Germany) Claudia Künzel	(Norway) Maj Helen Sorkmo	(Estonia) Kristina Šmigun	
6	14 December 2002	(Italy) Cogne	15 km C Mass Start	(Norway) Bente Skari	(Estonia) Kristina Šmigun	(Norway) Anita Moen	(Estonia) Kristina Šmigun	
7	15 December 2002	(Italy) Cogne	Sprint C	(Norway) Bente Skari	(Norway) Marit Bjørgen	(Norway) Hilde Gjermundshaug Pedersen	(Norway) Bente Skari	
8	19 December 2002	(Austria) Linz	Sprint F	(Finland) Pirjo Manninen	(Norway) Hilde Gjermundshaug Pedersen	(Canada) Beckie Scott	(Norway) Bente Skari	
9	21 December 2002	(Austria) Ramsau	5 km C + 5 km F Double Pursuit	(Norway) Bente Skari	(Norway) Marit Bjørgen	(Estonia) Kristina Šmigun	(Norway) Bente Skari	
10	4 January 2003	(Russia) Kavgolovo	5 km F	(Estonia) Kristina Šmigun	(Italy) Sabina Valbusa	(Italy) Gabriella Paruzzi	(Norway) Bente Skari	
11	12 January 2003	(Estonia) Otepää	15 km C Mass Start	(Norway) Bente Skari	(Estonia) Kristina Šmigun	(Finland) Kaisa Varis	(Norway) Bente Skari	
12	18 January 2003	(Czech Republic) Nové Město	10 km F	(Norway) Bente Skari	(Italy) Gabriella Paruzzi	(Estonia) Kristina Šmigun	(Norway) Bente Skari	
13	25 January 2003	(Germany) Oberhof	10 km C Mass Start	(Norway) Bente Skari	(Norway) Hilde Gjermundshaug Pedersen	(Finland) Kaisa Varis	(Norway) Bente Skari	
14	12 February 2003	(Germany) Reit im Winkl	Sprint F	(Norway) Marit Bjørgen	(Germany) Evi Sachenbacher	(Italy) Sabina Valbusa	(Norway) Bente Skari	
15	15 February 2003	(Italy) Asiago	5 km C	(Norway) Bente Skari	(Canada) Beckie Scott	(Russia) Olga Zavyalova	(Norway) Bente Skari	
FIS Nordic World Ski Championships 2003 (22 February – 5 March)
16	6 March 2003	(Norway) Oslo	Sprint C	(Norway) Bente Skari	(Germany) Manuela Henkel	(Finland) Kirsi Välimaa	(Norway) Bente Skari	
17	8 March 2003	(Norway) Oslo	30 km C	(Norway) Bente Skari	(Finland) Annmari Viljanmaa	(Finland) Aino-Kaisa Saarinen	(Norway) Bente Skari	
18	11 March 2003	(Norway) Drammen	Sprint C	(Norway) Bente Skari	(Germany) Manuela Henkel	(Finland) Virpi Kuitunen	(Norway) Bente Skari	
19	16 March 2003	(Finland) Lahti	10 km F	(Italy) Gabriella Paruzzi	(Russia) Olga Zavyalova	(Norway) Bente Skari	(Norway) Bente Skari	
20	20 March 2003	(Sweden) Borlänge	Sprint F	(Norway) Bente Skari	(Canada) Beckie Scott	(Norway) Marit Bjørgen	(Norway) Bente Skari	
21	22 March 2003	(Sweden) Falun	5 km C + 5 km F Double Pursuit	(Norway) Bente Skari	(Germany) Evi Sachenbacher	(Russia) Olga Zavyalova	(Norway) Bente Skari	

=== Men's team ===
WC	Date	Place	Discipline	Winner	Second	Third	Ref.
	27 October 2002	(Germany) Düsseldorf	Team Sprint F	cancelled, not rescheduled			
1	24 November 2002	(Sweden) Kiruna	4 × 10 km relay C/F	Italy Giorgio Di Centa; Fulvio Valbusa; Pietro Piller Cottrer; Cristian Zorzi	Norway Kristen Skjeldal; Anders Aukland; Tor Arne Hetland; Thomas Alsgaard	Germany Andreas Schlütter; Axel Teichmann; Tobias Angerer; René Sommerfeldt	
2	8 December 2002	(Switzerland) Davos	4 × 10 km relay C/F	Norway II Anders Aukland; Tore Bjonviken; Tor Arne Hetland; Thomas Alsgaard	Italy Giorgio Di Centa; Freddy Schwienbacher; Pietro Piller Cottrer; Cristian Zorzi	Norway Odd-Bjørn Hjelmeset; Frode Estil; Kristen Skjeldal; Espen Bjervig	
	5 January 2003	(Russia) Kavgolovo	Team Sprint F	cancelled, not rescheduled			
3	19 January 2003	(Czech Republic) Nové Město	4 × 10 km relay C/F	Norway Anders Aukland; Frode Estil; Tore Ruud Hofstad; Thomas Alsgaard	Italy Giorgio Di Centa; Fulvio Valbusa; Cristian Zorzi; Freddy Schwienbacher	Germany Jens Filbrich; Andreas Schlütter; Tobias Angerer; Andreas Stitzl	
4	26 January 2003	(Germany) Oberhof	Team Sprint F	Italy Giorgio Di Centa; Cristian Zorzi	Germany René Sommerfeldt; Tobias Angerer	Norway Jens Arne Svartedal; Thomas Alsgaard	
5	14 February 2003	(Italy) Asiago	Team Sprint F	Italy Giorgio Di Centa; Cristian Zorzi	Germany II René Sommerfeldt; Tobias Angerer	Italy II Renato Pasini; Freddy Schwienbacher	
6	23 March 2003	(Sweden) Falun	4 × 10 km relay C/F	Sweden Lars Carlsson; Mathias Fredriksson; Anders Södergren; Jörgen Brink	Italy Giorgio Di Centa; Fulvio Valbusa; Pietro Piller Cottrer; Cristian Zorzi	Germany Jens Filbrich; Andreas Schlütter; René Sommerfeldt; Axel Teichmann	

=== Women's team ===
WC	Date	Place	Discipline	Winner	Second	Third	Ref.
	27 October 2002	(Germany) Düsseldorf	Team Sprint F	cancelled, not rescheduled			
1	24 November 2002	(Sweden) Kiruna	4 × 5 km relay C/F	Norway Anita Moen; Bente Skari; Maj Helen Sorkmo; Vibeke Skofterud	Germany Manuela Henkel; Viola Bauer; Claudia Künzel; Evi Sachenbacher	Italy Magda Genuin; Gabriella Paruzzi; Arianna Follis; Sabina Valbusa	
2	8 December 2002	(Switzerland) Davos	4 × 5 km relay C/F	Norway Vibeke Skofterud; Bente Skari; Hilde Gjermundshaug Pedersen; Maj Helen Sorkmo	Russia Olga Zavyalova; Lilia Vasilieva; Yevgeniya Medvedeva-Arbuzova; Nina Gavrylyuk	Germany Manuela Henkel; Viola Bauer; Evi Sachenbacher; Claudia Künzel	
	5 January 2003	(Russia) Kavgolovo	Team Sprint F	cancelled, not rescheduled			
3	19 January 2003	(Czech Republic) Nové Město	4 × 5 km relay C/F	Germany Viola Bauer; Manuela Henkel; Claudia Künzel; Evi Sachenbacher	Norway Anita Moen; Marit Bjørgen; Kristin Størmer Steira; Hilde Gjermundshaug Pedersen	Finland Kirsi Välimaa; Aino-Kaisa Saarinen; Elina Hietamäki; Kaisa Varis	
4	26 January 2003	(Germany) Oberhof	Team Sprint F	Norway Anita Moen; Hilde Gjermundshaug Pedersen	Germany II Claudia Künzel; Manuela Henkel	Germany III Viola Bauer; Stefanie Böhler	
5	14 February 2003	(Italy) Asiago	Team Sprint F	Germany II Claudia Künzel; Evi Sachenbacher	Russia II Alyona Sidko; Natalya Korostelyova	Italy Karin Moroder; Arianna Follis	
6	23 March 2003	(Sweden) Falun	4 × 5 km relay C/F	Germany Manuela Henkel; Viola Bauer; Claudia Künzel; Evi Sachenbacher	Norway Anita Moen; Hilde Gjermundshaug Pedersen; Kristin Størmer Steira; Bente Skari	Italy Sabina Valbusa; Gabriella Paruzzi; Antonella Confortola; Arianna Follis	

=== Mixed team ===
WC	Date	Place	Discipline	Winner	Second	Third	Ref.
1	1 December 2002	(Finland) Ruka	2 × 5 km/2 × 10 km C/F	Finland Annmari Viljanmaa; Ari Palolahti; Pirjo Manninen; Teemu Kattilakoski	Finland II Kirsi Välimaa; Kuisma Taipale; Riitta-Liisa Lassila; Sami Jauhojärvi	Italy Gabriella Paruzzi; Fulvio Valbusa; Sabina Valbusa; Pietro Piller Cottrer	

== Men's standings ==
=== Overall ===
Rank	Skier	Points
1	(Sweden) Mathias Fredriksson	876
2	(Germany) René Sommerfeldt	589
3	(Sweden) Jörgen Brink	441
4	(Germany) Axel Teichmann	441
5	(Czech Republic) Lukáš Bauer	429
6	(Norway) Frode Estil	414
7	(Estonia) Andrus Veerpalu	370
8	(France) Vincent Vittoz	352
9	(Norway) Tor Arne Hetland	340
10	(Norway) Anders Aukland	340

Rank	Skier	Points
11	(Italy) Giorgio Di Centa	338
12	(Italy) Cristian Zorzi	315
13	(Germany) Tobias Angerer	312
14	(Italy) Fulvio Valbusa	309
15	(Norway) Jens Arne Svartedal	294
16	(Sweden) Anders Södergren	286
17	(Sweden) Thobias Fredriksson	284
18	(Italy) Pietro Piller Cottrer	282
19	(Estonia) Jaak Mae	272
20	(Russia) Vasily Rochev	271

Rank	Skier	Points
21	(Sweden) Peter Larsson	225
22	(Norway) Kristen Skjeldal	225
23	(Czech Republic) Martin Koukal	217
24	(Sweden) Per Elofsson	209
25	(Norway) Odd-Bjørn Hjelmeset	199
26	(Finland) Lauri Pyykönen	195
27	(Norway) Håvard Bjerkeli	190
28	(Germany) Andreas Schlütter	185
29	(Germany) Jens Filbrich	173
30	(Slovakia) Ivan Bátory	172

=== Sprint ===
Rank	Skier	Points
1	(Sweden) Thobias Fredriksson	416
2	(Norway) Tor Arne Hetland	391
3	(Finland) Lauri Pyykönen	280
4	(Sweden) Jörgen Brink	279
5	(Italy) Cristian Zorzi	276
6	(Norway) Håvard Bjerkeli	267
7	(Sweden) Peter Larsson	248
8	(Norway) Jens Arne Svartedal	215
9	(Sweden) Mikael Östberg	195
10	(Germany) René Sommerfeldt	195

== Women's standings ==
=== Overall ===
Rank	Skier	Points
1	(Norway) Bente Skari	1392
2	(Estonia) Kristina Šmigun	834
3	(Italy) Gabriella Paruzzi	713
4	(Germany) Evi Sachenbacher	667
5	(Norway) Hilde Gjermundshaug Pedersen	543
6	(Norway) Marit Bjørgen	508
7	(Germany) Claudia Künzel	466
8	(Italy) Sabina Valbusa	427
9	(Canada) Beckie Scott	405
10	(Norway) Anita Moen	398

Rank	Skier	Points
11	(Russia) Olga Zavyalova	378
12	(Germany) Manuela Henkel	360
13	(Ukraine) Valentyna Shevchenko	317
14	(Slovenia) Petra Majdič	275
15	(Finland) Annmari Viljanmaa	274
16	(Finland) Pirjo Manninen	271
17	(Russia) Natalya Korostelyova	269
18	(Russia) Nina Gavrylyuk	230
19	(Finland) Kirsi Välimaa	229
20	(Germany) Viola Bauer	224

Rank	Skier	Points
21	(Norway) Vibeke Skofterud	217
22	(Norway) Maj Helen Sorkmo	202
23	(Finland) Virpi Kuitunen	188
24	(Sweden) Jenny Olsson	187
25	(Russia) Alyona Sidko	185
26	(Finland) Kaisa Varis	184
27	(Finland) Aino-Kaisa Saarinen	169
28	(Russia) Lilia Vasilieva	163
29	(Sweden) Elin Ek	155
30	(Russia) Yelena Burukhina	151

=== Sprint ===
Rank	Skier	Points
1	(Norway) Marit Bjørgen	485
2	(Norway) Bente Skari	410
3	(Finland) Pirjo Manninen	292
4	(Germany) Manuela Henkel	276
5	(Norway) Anita Moen	263
6	(Norway) Hilde Gjermundshaug Pedersen	248
7	(Germany) Claudia Künzel	230
8	(Norway) Maj Helen Sorkmo	196
9	(Germany) Evi Sachenbacher	190
10	(Canada) Beckie Scott	181

== Achievements ==
Victories in this World Cup (all-time number of victories as of 2002/03 season in parentheses)

Men

- Mathias Fredriksson (SWE), 4 (5) first places
- Tor Arne Hetland (NOR), 2 (6) first places
- Andrus Veerpalu (EST), 2 (2) first places
- Cristian Zorzi (ITA), 1 (5) first place
- Jens Arne Svartedal (NOR), 1 (4) first places
- Frode Estil (NOR), 1 (2) first place
- Håvard Bjerkeli (NOR), 1 (2) first place
- Peter Larsson (SWE), 1 (1) first place
- Vincent Vittoz (FRA), 1 (1) first place
- Vasily Rochev (RUS), 1 (1) first place
- Mikael Östberg (SWE), 1 (1) first place
- Axel Teichmann (GER), 1 (1) first place
- René Sommerfeldt (GER), 1 (1) first place
- Jörgen Brink (SWE), 1 (1) first place
- Lukáš Bauer (CZE), 1 (1) first place
- Thobias Fredriksson (SWE), 1 (1) first place

Women

- Bente Skari (NOR), 14 (42) first places
- Marit Bjørgen (NOR), 3 (3) first places
- Kristina Šmigun (EST), 2 (9) first places
- Pirjo Manninen (FIN), 1 (4) first place
- Evi Sachenbacher (GER), 1 (2) first place
- Gabriella Paruzzi (ITA), 1 (1) first place
