= 2010–11 Tour de Ski =

Cross country skiing competition

Tour de Ski
2010–11 FIS Cross-Country World Cup

Ski tour details
- Venue(s): Oberhof, Germany; Oberstdorf, Germany; Toblach, Italy; Cortina d'Ampezzo, Italy; Val di Fiemme, Italy
- Dates: 31 December 2010 – 9 January 2011
- Stages: 8

Results
Men
Jersey awarded to the men's overall winner	Winner	Dario Cologna (SUI)
	Second	Petter Northug (NOR)
	Third	Lukáš Bauer (CZE)
Jersey awarded to the men's sprint classification winner	Sprint	Dario Cologna (SUI)
Women
Jersey awarded to the women's overall winner	Winner	Justyna Kowalczyk (POL)
	Second	Therese Johaug (NOR)
	Third	Marianna Longa (ITA)
Jersey awarded to the women's sprint classification winner	Sprint	Justyna Kowalczyk (POL)

The 2010–11 Tour de Ski was the 5th edition of the Tour de Ski and took place from 31 December 2010 to 9 January 2011. The race started in Oberhof, Germany, and ended in Val di Fiemme, Italy. The defending champions were Lukáš Bauer of the Czech Republic for the men and Poland's Justyna Kowalczyk for the women. Kowalczyk defende her title, and Swiss Dario Cologna won the Men's title.

== Final standings ==
Legend
Denotes the winner of the Overall standings	Denotes the winner of the Sprint standings

=== Overall standings ===
==== Men ====
Final overall standings (1–10)
Rank	Name	Time
1	(Switzerland) Dario Cologna	4:28:02.0
2	(Norway) Petter Northug	+27.3
3	(Czech Republic) Lukáš Bauer	+1:44.1
4	(Switzerland) Curdin Perl	+1:58.2
5	(Italy) Roland Clara	+2:06.5
6	(France) Jean-Marc Gaillard	+2:27.5
7	(Canada) Devon Kershaw	+2:31.7
8	(Czech Republic) Martin Jakš	+2:39.9
9	(Sweden) Daniel Rickardsson	+3:00.2
10	(Canada) Alex Harvey	+3:09.2

==== Women ====
Final overall standings (1–10)
Rank	Name	Time
1	(Poland) Justyna Kowalczyk	2:47:31.0
2	(Norway) Therese Johaug	+1:21.5
3	(Italy) Marianna Longa	+2:40.7
4	(Italy) Arianna Follis	+3:19.9
5	(Sweden) Charlotte Kalla	+4:27.7
6	(Slovenia) Petra Majdič	+4:52.6
7	(Norway) Marthe Kristoffersen	+5:09.0
8	(Finland) Krista Lähteenmäki	+5:15.2
9	(Norway) Marte Elden	+5:25.6
10	(Norway) Astrid Uhrenholdt Jacobsen	+5:57.9

=== Sprint standings ===
==== Men ====
Final sprint standings (1–10)
Rank	Name	Time
1	(Switzerland) Dario Cologna	3:58
2	(Norway) Petter Northug	2:58
3	(Sweden) Marcus Hellner	2:56
4	(Canada) Devon Kershaw	2:21
5	(Czech Republic) Martin Jakš	1:13
6	(Canada) Alex Harvey	1:02
7	(Sweden) Daniel Rickardsson	0:47
8	(Switzerland) Curdin Perl	0:35
9	(Russia) Dmitriy Yaparov	0:34
10	(Finland) Matti Heikkinen	0:32

==== Women ====
Final sprint standings (1–10)
Rank	Name	Time
1	(Poland) Justyna Kowalczyk	3:05
2	(Slovenia) Petra Majdič	2:00
3	(Italy) Arianna Follis	1:27
4	(Sweden) Anna Haag	1:20
5	(Sweden) Charlotte Kalla	1:20
6	(Italy) Marianna Longa	1:18
7	(Norway) Astrid Uhrenholdt Jacobsen	1:07
8	(Finland) Aino-Kaisa Saarinen	1:05
9	(United States) Kikkan Randall	0:58
10	(Sweden) Britta Johansson Norgren	0:51

== Stages ==
=== Stage 1 ===
31 December 2010, Oberhof, Germany - prologue

Men - 3.75 km freestyle
Place	Name	Time
1	Marcus Hellner (SWE)	7:34.5
2	Alexey Petukhov (RUS)	+2.0
3	Petter Northug (NOR)	+2.9
4	Alexander Legkov (RUS)	+4.8
5	Loris Frasnelli (ITA)	+5.1
6	Robin Duvillard (FRA)	+5.8
7	Dario Cologna (SUI)	+6.7
8	Ilia Chernousov (RUS)	+8.3
9	Lukáš Bauer (CZE)	+8.6
10	Jean-Marc Gaillard (FRA)	+9.4

Women - 2.8 km freestyle
Place	Name	Time
1	Justyna Kowalczyk (POL)	6:39.0
2	Charlotte Kalla (SWE)	+1.5
3	Astrid Uhrenholdt Jacobsen (NOR)	+4.8
4	Riitta-Liisa Roponen (FIN)	+5.7
5	Yuliya Chekalyova (RUS)	+7.2
6	Aino-Kaisa Saarinen (FIN)	+7.3
7	Denise Herrmann (GER)	+8.7
8	Petra Majdič (SLO)	+9.3
9	Laure Barthélémy (FRA)	+9.5
9	Krista Lähteenmäki (FIN)	+9.5

=== Stage 2 ===
1 January 2011, Oberhof - distance (handicap start)

Men - 15 km classical (pursuit)
Place	Name	Time
1	Dario Cologna (SUI)	47:48.1
2	Devon Kershaw (CAN)	+0.5
3	Alexander Legkov (RUS)	+0.8
4	Ilia Chernousov (RUS)	+4.2
5	Petter Northug (NOR)	+5.4
6	Sami Jauhojärvi (FIN)	+5.5
7	Matti Heikkinen (FIN)	+7.4
8	Ville Nousiainen (FIN)	+8.3
9	Alex Harvey (CAN)	+9.1
10	Axel Teichmann (GER)	+10.1

Women - 10 km classical (pursuit)
Place	Name	Time
1	Justyna Kowalczyk (POL)	33:32.5
2	Krista Lähteenmäki (FIN)	+27.5
3	Marianna Longa (ITA)	+30.5
4	Aino-Kaisa Saarinen (FIN)	+31.6
5	Petra Majdič (SLO)	+34.5
6	Riitta-Liisa Roponen (FIN)	+34.8
7	Charlotte Kalla (SWE)	+35.1
8	Arianna Follis (ITA)	+35.2
9	Therese Johaug (NOR)	+36.1
10	Yuliya Chekalyova (RUS)	+37.3

=== Stage 3 ===
2 January 2011, Oberstdorf, Germany - sprint

Men - sprint classical
Place	Name	Time
1	(Sweden) Emil Jönsson	2:34.1
2	(Canada) Devon Kershaw	+0.0
3	(Switzerland) Dario Cologna	+0.3
4	(Norway) Simen Østensen	+6.2
5	(Russia) Alexey Petukhov	+6.5
6	(Russia) Alexander Legkov	

Women - sprint classical
Place	Name	Time
1	(Slovenia) Petra Majdič	2:50.8
2	(Poland) Justyna Kowalczyk	+4.3
3	(Norway) Astrid Uhrenholdt Jacobsen	+4.8
4	(Slovakia) Alena Procházková	+9.2
5	(Russia) Yuliya Ivanova	+10.1
6	(Finland) Aino-Kaisa Saarinen	

=== Stage 4 ===
3 January 2011, Oberstdorf - pursuit

Men - 10+10 km
Place	Name	Time
1	(Finland) Matti Heikkinen	49:20.1
2	(Switzerland) Dario Cologna	+1.0
3	(Czech Republic) Martin Jakš	+4.9
4	(France) Jean-Marc Gaillard	+5.0
5	(Czech Republic) Lukáš Bauer	+5.9
6	(Sweden) Daniel Rickardsson	+7.4
7	(Canada) Devon Kershaw	+8.2
8	(Russia) Alexander Legkov	+9.6
9	(Norway) Tord Asle Gjerdalen	+10.6
10	(Sweden) Marcus Hellner	+11.1

Women - 5+5 km
Place	Name	Time
1	(Sweden) Anna Haag	26:59.8
2	(Sweden) Charlotte Kalla	+0.6
3	(Norway) Marthe Kristoffersen	+7.2
4	(Italy) Arianna Follis	+7.8
5	(Poland) Justyna Kowalczyk	+8.7
6	(Italy) Marianna Longa	+8.9
7	(Norway) Therese Johaug	+9.7
8	(Finland) Krista Lähteenmäki	+10.9
9	(Finland) Riitta-Liisa Roponen	+15.9
10	(Slovenia) Petra Majdič	+29.4

=== Stage 5 ===
5 January 2011, Toblach, Italy - sprint F

Men - sprint 1.3 km freestyle
Place	Name	Time
1	(Canada) Devon Kershaw	2:58.0
2	(Switzerland) Dario Cologna	+0.1
3	(Norway) Petter Northug	+1.2
4	(Sweden) Marcus Hellner	+2.8
5	(Norway) Simen Østensen	+3.4
6	(Sweden) Jesper Modin	

Women - sprint 1.3 km freestyle
Place	Name	Time
1	(Slovenia) Petra Majdič	3:17.5
2	(Italy) Arianna Follis	+0.1
3	(Italy) Magda Genuin	+0.5
4	(France) Laure Barthélémy	+8.0
5	(United States) Kikkan Randall	+16.6
6	(Sweden) Britta Johansson Norgren	

=== Stage 6 ===
6 January 2011, Cortina d'Ampezzo – Toblach - distance (handicap start)

Men - 35 km freestyle (pursuit)
Place	Name	Time
1	(Switzerland) Dario Cologna	1:20:06.9
2	(Sweden) Marcus Hellner	+1:06.3
3	(Norway) Petter Northug	+1:39.9
4	(Czech Republic) Martin Jakš	+1:40.7
5	(Canada) Alex Harvey	+1:41.2
6	(Switzerland) Curdin Perl	+1:41.5
7	(Sweden) Daniel Rickardsson	+1:41.6
8	(Finland) Matti Heikkinen	+1:42.1
9	(France) Jean-Marc Gaillard	+1:42.1
10	(Canada) Devon Kershaw	+1:46.6

Women - 15 km freestyle (pursuit)
Place	Name	Time
1	(Poland) Justyna Kowalczyk	37:41.7
2	(Italy) Arianna Follis	+22.2
3	(Italy) Marianna Longa	+22.6
4	(Sweden) Charlotte Kalla	+23.7
5	(Slovenia) Petra Majdič	+36.4
6	(Sweden) Anna Haag	+1:41.4
7	(Finland) Krista Lähteenmäki	+1:45.0
8	(Norway) Astrid Uhrenholdt Jacobsen	+2:21.4
9	(Norway) Therese Johaug	+2:44.5
10	(Slovakia) Alena Procházková	+2:47.7

=== Stage 7 ===
8 January 2011, Val di Fiemme, Italy - distance (mass start)

Men - 20 km classical (mass start)
Place	Name	Time
1	(Norway) Petter Northug	57:17.2
2	(Switzerland) Dario Cologna	+1.8
3	(Canada) Devon Kershaw	+2.2
4	(Czech Republic) Martin Jakš	+2.6
5	(Canada) Alex Harvey	+2.9
6	(Italy) Roland Clara	+3.7
7	(Germany) Jens Filbrich	+3.9
8	(Switzerland) Curdin Perl	+4.5
9	(Sweden) Anders Södergren	+4.7
10	(Sweden) Daniel Rickardsson	+5.1

Women - 10 km classical (mass start)
Place	Name	Time
1	(Poland) Justyna Kowalczyk	30:27.6
2	(Norway) Therese Johaug	+6.3
3	(Italy) Marianna Longa	+55.7
4	(Norway) Marte Elden	+1:01.4
5	(Finland) Aino-Kaisa Saarinen	+1:14.0
6	(Italy) Arianna Follis	+1:20.8
7	(Norway) Marthe Kristoffersen	+1:25.1
8	(Germany) Katrin Zeller	+1:28.1
9	(Slovenia) Petra Majdič	+1:32.0
10	(Norway) Ingvild Flugstad Østberg	+1:33.3

=== Stage 8 ===
9 January 2011, Val di Fiemme - distance (handicap start)

Men - 9 km freestyle (Fastest of the Day)
Place	Name	Time
1	(Czech Republic) Lukáš Bauer	30:28.3
2	(Italy) Roland Clara	+ 32.4
3	(Switzerland) Curdin Perl	+ 33.8
4	(France) Vincent Vittoz	+ 35.0
5	(Norway) Petter Northug	+ 39.0
6	(Canada) Ivan Babikov	+ 47.1
7	(United States) Kris Freeman	+ 53.9
8	(Italy) Thomas Moriggl	+ 58.0
9	(France) Jean-Marc Gaillard	+ 1:01.4
10	(Germany) Tom Reichelt	+ 1:03.2

Women - 9 km freestyle (Fastest of the Day)
Place	Name	Time
1	(Norway) Therese Johaug	33:14.4
2	(Norway) Marte Elden	+1:00.4
3	(Norway) Marthe Kristoffersen	+1:53.9
4	(Poland) Justyna Kowalczyk	+1:59.3
5	(Ukraine) Valentyna Shevchenko	+2:06.8
6	(Finland) Krista Lähteenmäki	+2:12.7
7	(Germany) Katrin Zeller	+2:20.8
8	(Sweden) Maria Rydqvist	+2:26.2
9	(Italy) Marianna Longa	+2:31.7
10	(Norway) Astrid Uhrenholdt Jacobsen	+2:42.0
