= Gjøvik =

Gjøvik may refer to:

== Places ==
- Gjøvik (town), a town within Gjøvik Municipality in Innlandet county, Norway
- Gjøvik Municipality, a municipality in Innlandet county, Norway
- Gjøvik Station, a railway station in Gjøvik Municipality in Innlandet county, Norway
- Gjøvik Church, a church in Gjøvik Municipality in Innlandet county, Norway

== People ==
- Ashley Gjøvik, an American program manager and activist

== Sports ==
- Gjøvik FF, a former Norwegian association football club
- Gjøvik FK, a former Norwegian women's association football club
- SK Gjøvik-Lyn, a Norwegian football club
- Gjøvik Hockey, a Norwegian hockey club

== Other ==
- Gjøvik University College, a university college based in Gjøvik, Norway (part of the Norwegian University of Science and Technology)
- Gjøvik Line, a Norwegian railway line
- Gjøvik Stadion, a sports stadium in Gjøvik Municipality in Innlandet county, Norway
