= Heidi Weng =

Norwegian cross-country skier (born 1991)

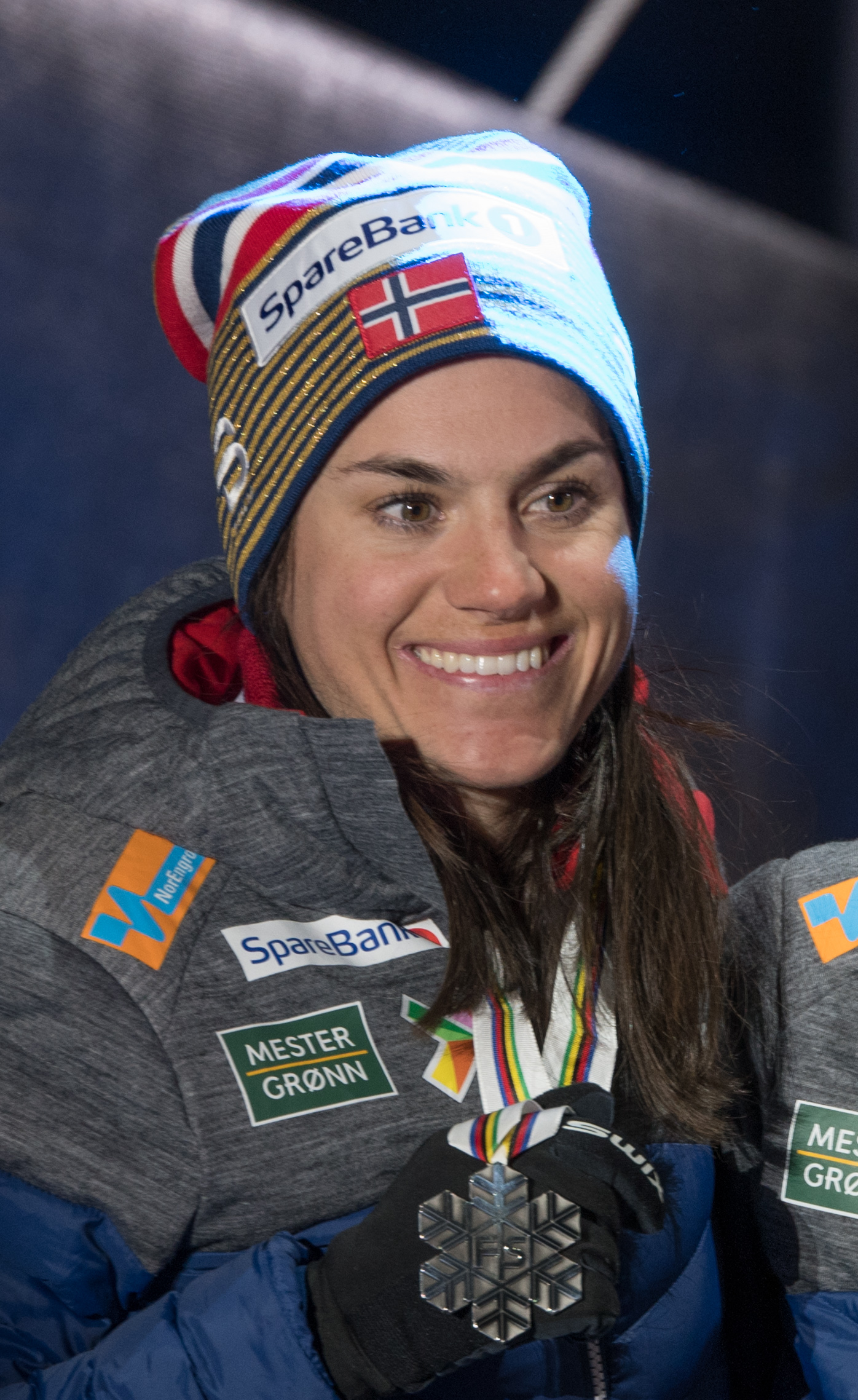
- Weng in 2019

Personal information
- Nationality: Norway
- Born: 20 July 1991 (age 35) Ytre Enebakk, Norway
- Height: 1.63 m (5 ft 4 in)

Sport
- Sport: Skiing
- Club: IL i BUL

World Cup career
- Seasons: 16 – (2010–present)
- Indiv. starts: 327
- Indiv. podiums: 128
- Indiv. wins: 14
- Team starts: 24
- Team podiums: 18
- Team wins: 12
- Overall titles: 2 – (2017, 2018)
- Discipline titles: 2 – (DI 2017, 2018)
Medal record
Women's cross-country skiing
Representing Norway
Olympic Games
Gold medal – first place	2026 Milano Cortina	4 × 7.5 km relay
Silver medal – second place	2026 Milano Cortina	50 km classical
Bronze medal – third place	2014 Sochi	15 km skiathlon
Bronze medal – third place	2026 Milano Cortina	20 km skiathlon
World Championships
Gold medal – first place	2013 Val di Fiemme	4 × 5 km relay
Gold medal – first place	2015 Falun	4 × 5 km relay
Gold medal – first place	2017 Lahti	Team sprint
Gold medal – first place	2017 Lahti	4 × 5 km relay
Gold medal – first place	2021 Oberstdorf	4 × 5 km relay
Silver medal – second place	2017 Lahti	30 km freestyle
Silver medal – second place	2019 Seefeld	4 × 5 km relay
Silver medal – second place	2021 Oberstdorf	30 km classical
Silver medal – second place	2025 Trondheim	50 km freestyle
Silver medal – second place	2025 Trondheim	4 x 7.5 km relay
Bronze medal – third place	2013 Val di Fiemme	15 km pursuit
Junior World Championships
Gold medal – first place	2010 Hinterzarten	4 × 3.33 km relay
Gold medal – first place	2011 Otepää	10 km pursuit
Gold medal – first place	2011 Otepää	4 × 3.33 km relay
Silver medal – second place	2010 Hinterzarten	10 km pursuit
Bronze medal – third place	2011 Otepää	5 km freestyle
- Updated on 22 March 2026

Heidi Weng (born 20 July 1991) is a Norwegian cross-country skier and fell runner.

== Career ==
In cross-country skiing her best individual World Cup finish is her victories in Tour de Ski both 2016–17 and 2017–18. She has won three gold medals at the Junior World Championships, two in relay and one in pursuit. She has won six medals at World Championships, four of them gold.

She is a Norwegian senior champion in fell running in 2010, and placed fourth at the World Junior Championships in the same year. She is also a Norwegian junior champion in cross-country running.

She hails from Ytre Enebakk, but represents the club IL i BUL.

Weng won the bronze medal at the skiathlon event at the 2014 Winter Olympics in Sochi.

Heidi Weng won the Bronze medal in 20 kilometre skiathlon at the 2026 Winter Olympics. Weng later won the Silver medal in the 50 km classical race at the same Olympics.

== Cross-country skiing results ==
All results are sourced from the International Ski Federation (FIS).

=== Olympic Games ===
- 4 medals – (1 gold, 1 silver, 2 bronze)

Year	Age	10 km individual	15/20 km skiathlon	30/50 km mass start	Sprint	4 × 5/7.5 km relay	Team sprint
2014	22	9	Bronze	19	—	5	—
2018	26	11	9	8	11	—	—
2026	34	5	Bronze	Silver	—	Gold	—

=== World Championships ===
- 11 medals – (5 gold, 5 silver, 1 bronze)

Year	Age	10 km individual	15/20 km skiathlon	30/50 km mass start	Sprint	4 × 5/7.5 km relay	Team sprint
2013	21	6	Bronze	4	—	Gold	—
2015	23	22	7	8	—	Gold	—
2017	25	4	5	Silver	7	Gold	Gold
2019	27	19	7	—	—	Silver	—
2021	29	15	9	Silver	—	Gold	—
2025	33	5	5	Silver	—	Silver	—

=== World Cup ===
==== Season titles ====
- 4 titles – (2 Overall, 2 Distance)

Season
Season	Discipline
2017	Overall
2017	Distance
2018	Overall
2018	Distance

==== Season standings ====
Season	Age	Discipline standings			Ski Tour standings				
Season	Age	Overall	Distance	Sprint	Nordic Opening	Tour de Ski	Ski Tour 2020	World Cup Final	Ski Tour Canada
2010	18	110	87	NC	—N/a	—	—N/a	—	—N/a
2011	19	59	49	83	—	—	—N/a	18	—N/a
2012	20	10	10	21	16	DNF	—N/a	2nd place, silver medalist(s)	—N/a
2013	21	5	4	13	3rd place, bronze medalist(s)	6	—N/a	4	—N/a
2014	22	4	5	27	9	3rd place, bronze medalist(s)	—N/a	3rd place, bronze medalist(s)	—N/a
2015	23	3rd place, bronze medalist(s)	3rd place, bronze medalist(s)	5	3rd place, bronze medalist(s)	3rd place, bronze medalist(s)	—N/a	—N/a	—N/a
2016	24	3rd place, bronze medalist(s)	2nd place, silver medalist(s)	4	9	3rd place, bronze medalist(s)	—N/a	—N/a	2nd place, silver medalist(s)
2017	25	1st place, gold medalist(s)	1st place, gold medalist(s)	4	1st place, gold medalist(s)	1st place, gold medalist(s)	—N/a	2nd place, silver medalist(s)	—N/a
2018	26	1st place, gold medalist(s)	1st place, gold medalist(s)	15	4	1st place, gold medalist(s)	—N/a	18	—N/a
2019	27	16	11	77	16	7	—N/a	20	—N/a
2020	28	2nd place, silver medalist(s)	2nd place, silver medalist(s)	14	2nd place, silver medalist(s)	4	2nd place, silver medalist(s)	—N/a	—N/a
2021	29	20	7	NC	DNF	—	—N/a	—N/a	—N/a
2022	30	6	5	41	—N/a	3rd place, bronze medalist(s)	—N/a	—N/a	—N/a
2023	31	10	4	98	—N/a	6	—N/a	—N/a	—N/a
2024	32	8	6	51	—N/a	2nd place, silver medalist(s)	—N/a	—N/a	—N/a
2025	33	8	8	74	—N/a	5	—N/a	—N/a	—N/a
2026	34	5	3rd place, bronze medalist(s)	108	—N/a	3rd place, bronze medalist(s)	—N/a	—N/a	—N/a

==== Individual podiums ====
- 14 victories – (6 WC, 8 SWC)
- 128 podiums – (70 WC, 58 SWC)

No.	Season	Date	Location	Race	Level	Place
1	2011–12	3 March 2012	Lahti, Finland	7.5 km + 7.5 km Skiathlon C/F	World Cup	3rd
2	2011–12	17 March 2012	Falun, Sweden	10 km Mass Start C	Stage World Cup	2nd
3	2011–12	18 March 2012	Falun, Sweden	10 km Pursuit F	Stage World Cup	3rd
4	2011–12	14–18 March 2012	(Sweden) World Cup Final	Overall Standings	World Cup	2nd
5	2012–13	2 December 2012	Rukatunturi, Finland	10 km Pursuit C	Stage World Cup	3rd
6	2012–13	30 November – 2 December 2012	(Finland) Nordic Opening	Overall Standings	World Cup	3rd
7	2012–13	1 January 2013	Val Müstair, Switzerland	1.4 km Sprint F	Stage World Cup	3rd
8	2012–13	6 January 2013	Val di Fiemme, Italy	9 km Pursuit F	Stage World Cup	3rd
9	2012–13	10 March 2013	Lahti, Finland	10 km Individual C	World Cup	3rd
10	2012–13	15 March 2013	Drammen, Norway	1.3 km Sprint C	World Cup	2nd
11	2012–13	23 March 2013	Falun, Sweden	10 km Mass Start C	Stage World Cup	3rd
12	2013–14	28 December 2013 – 5 January 2014	(Germany) (Switzerland) (Italy) Tour de Ski	Overall Standings	World Cup	3rd
13	2013–14	16 March 2014	Falun, Sweden	10 km Pursuit F	Stage World Cup	3rd
14	2013–14	14–16 March 2014	(Sweden) World Cup Final	Overall Standings	World Cup	3rd
15	2014–15	5 December 2014	Lillehammer, Norway	1.5 km Sprint F	Stage World Cup	3rd
16	2014–15	6 December 2014	Lillehammer, Norway	5 km Individual F	Stage World Cup	3rd
17	2014–15	7 December 2014	Lillehammer, Norway	10 km Pursuit C	Stage World Cup	2nd
18	2014–15	5–7 December 2014	(Norway) Nordic Opening	Overall Standings	World Cup	3rd
19	2014–15	20 December 2014	Davos, Switzerland	10 km Individual F	World Cup	3rd
20	2014–15	3 January 2015	Oberstdorf, Germany	3 km Individual F	Stage World Cup	2nd
21	2014–15	4 January 2015	Oberstdorf, Germany	10 km Pursuit C	Stage World Cup	2nd
22	2014–15	6 January 2015	Val Müstair, Switzerland	1.4 km Sprint F	Stage World Cup	2nd
23	2014–15	7 January 2015	Toblach, Italy	5 km Individual C	Stage World Cup	3rd
24	2014–15	8 January 2015	Toblach, Italy	15 km Pursuit F	Stage World Cup	2nd
25	2014–15	10 January 2015	Val di Fiemme, Italy	10 km Mass Start C	Stage World Cup	3rd
26	2014–15	11 January 2015	Val di Fiemme, Italy	9 km Pursuit F	Stage World Cup	2nd
27	2014–15	3–11 January 2015	(Germany) (Switzerland) (Italy) Tour de Ski	Overall Standings	World Cup	3rd
28	2014–15	8 March 2015	Lahti, Finland	10 km Individual C	World Cup	2nd
29	2014–15	11 March 2015	Drammen, Norway	1.3 km Sprint C	World Cup	2nd
30	2015–16	5 December 2015	Lillehammer, Norway	7.5 km + 7.5 km Skiathlon C/F	World Cup	2nd
31	2015–16	12 December 2015	Davos, Switzerland	15 km Individual F	World Cup	3rd
32	2015–16	2 January 2016	Lenzerheide, Switzerland	15 km Mass Start C	Stage World Cup	3rd
33	2015–16	3 January 2016	Lenzerheide, Switzerland	5 km Pursuit F	Stage World Cup	3rd
34	2015–16	5 January 2016	Oberstdorf, Germany	1.2 km Sprint C	Stage World Cup	2nd
35	2015–16	6 January 2016	Oberstdorf, Germany	10 km Mass Start C	Stage World Cup	3rd
36	2015–16	8 January 2016	Toblach, Italy	5 km Individual F	Stage World Cup	2nd
37	2015–16	9 January 2016	Val di Fiemme, Italy	10 km Mass Start C	Stage World Cup	1st
38	2015–16	10 January 2016	Val di Fiemme, Italy	9 km Pursuit F	Stage World Cup	2nd
39	2015–16	1–10 January 2016	(Switzerland) (Germany) (Italy) Tour de Ski	Overall Standings	World Cup	3rd
40	2015–16	16 January 2016	Planica, Slovenia	1.2 km Sprint F	World Cup	3rd
41	2015–16	13 February 2016	Falun, Sweden	5 km Individual C	World Cup	2nd
42	2015–16	14 February 2016	Falun, Sweden	10 km Mass Start F	World Cup	2nd
43	2015–16	20 February 2016	Lahti, Finland	1.6 km Sprint F	World Cup	3rd
44	2015–16	21 February 2016	Lahti, Finland	7.5 km + 7.5 km Skiathlon C/F	World Cup	2nd
45	2015–16	2 March 2016	Montreal, Canada	10.5 km Mass Start C	Stage World Cup	2nd
46	2015–16	4 March 2016	Quebec City, Canada	1.5 km Sprint F	Stage World Cup	3rd
47	2015–16	5 March 2016	Quebec City, Canada	10 km Pursuit F	Stage World Cup	1st
48	2015–16	9 March 2016	Canmore, Canada	7.5 km + 7.5 km Skiathlon C/F	Stage World Cup	1st
49	2015–16	11 March 2016	Canmore, Canada	10 km Individual F	Stage World Cup	2nd
50	2015–16	1–12 March 2016	Ski Tour Canada	Overall Standings	World Cup	2nd
51	2016–17	26 November 2016	Rukatunturi, Finland	1.4 km Sprint C	World Cup	3rd
52	2016–17	27 November 2016	Rukatunturi, Finland	10 km Individual C	World Cup	3rd
53	2016–17	2 December 2016	Lillehammer, Norway	1.3 km Sprint C	Stage World Cup	1st
54	2016–17	3 December 2016	Lillehammer, Norway	5 km Individual F	Stage World Cup	2nd
55	2016–17	4 December 2016	Lillehammer, Norway	10 km Pursuit C	Stage World Cup	3rd
56	2016–17	2–4 December 2016	(Norway) Nordic Opening	Overall Standings	World Cup	1st
57	2016–17	10 December 2016	Davos, Switzerland	15 km Individual F	World Cup	2nd
58	2016–17	17 December 2016	La Clusaz, France	10 km Mass Start F	World Cup	1st
59	2016–17	31 December 2016	Val Müstair, Switzerland	1.5 km Sprint F	Stage World Cup	3rd
60	2016–17	1 January 2017	Val Müstair, Switzerland	5 km Mass Start C	Stage World Cup	2nd
61	2016–17	3 January 2017	Oberstdorf, Germany	5 km + 5 km Skiathlon C/F	Stage World Cup	3rd
62	2016–17	4 January 2017	Oberstdorf, Germany	10 km Pursuit F	Stage World Cup	2nd
63	2016–17	8 January 2017	Val di Fiemme, Italy	9 km Pursuit F	Stage World Cup	1st
64	2016–17	31 December 2016 – 8 January 2017	(Switzerland) (Germany) (Italy) Tour de Ski	Overall Standings	World Cup	1st
65	2016–17	28 January 2017	Falun, Sweden	1.4 km Sprint F	World Cup	3rd
66	2016–17	29 January 2017	Falun, Sweden	15 km Mass Start C	World Cup	3rd
67	2016–17	18 February 2017	Otepää, Estonia	1.3 km Sprint F	World Cup	3rd
68	2016–17	19 February 2017	Otepää, Estonia	10 km Individual C	World Cup	3rd
69	2016–17	18 March 2017	Quebec City, Canada	10 km Mass Start C	Stage World Cup	2nd
70	2016–17	19 March 2017	Quebec City, Canada	10 km Pursuit F	Stage World Cup	2nd
71	2016–17	17–19 March 2017	(Canada) World Cup Final	Overall Standings	World Cup	2nd
72	2017–18	26 November 2017	Rukatunturi, Finland	10 km Pursuit F	World Cup	2nd
73	2017–18	3 December 2017	Lillehammer, Norway	7.5 km + 7.5 km Skiathlon C/F	World Cup	2nd
74	2017–18	16 December 2017	Toblach, Italy	10 km Individual F	World Cup	3rd
75	2017–18	17 December 2017	Toblach, Italy	10 km Pursuit C	World Cup	3rd
76	2017–18	31 December 2017	Lenzerheide, Switzerland	10 km Individual C	Stage World Cup	2nd
77	2017–18	1 January 2018	Lenzerheide, Switzerland	10 km Pursuit F	Stage World Cup	2nd
78	2017–18	6 January 2018	Val di Fiemme, Italy	10 km Mass Start C	Stage World Cup	1st
79	2017–18	7 January 2018	Val di Fiemme, Italy	9 km Pursuit F	Stage World Cup	1st
80	2017–18	30 December 2017 – 7 January 2018	(Switzerland) (Germany) (Italy) Tour de Ski	Overall Standings	World Cup	1st
81	2017–18	21 January 2018	Planica, Slovenia	10 km Individual C	World Cup	3rd
82	2017–18	28 January 2018	Seefeld, Austria	10 km Mass Start F	World Cup	2nd
83	2019–20	1 December 2019	Rukatunturi, Finland	10 km Pursuit F	Stage World Cup	2nd
84	2019–20	29 November – 1 December 2019	(Finland) Nordic Opening	Overall Standings	World Cup	2nd
85	2019–20	7 December 2019	Lillehammer, Norway	7.5 km + 7.5 km Skiathlon C/F	World Cup	3rd
86	2019–20	15 December 2019	Davos, Switzerland	10 km Individual F	World Cup	2nd
87	2019–20	28 December 2019	Lenzerheide, Switzerland	10 km Mass Start F	Stage World Cup	2nd
88	2019–20	1 January 2020	Toblach, Italy	10 km Pursuit C	Stage World Cup	3rd
89	2019–20	5 January 2020	Val di Fiemme, Italy	10 km Mass Start F	Stage World Cup	2nd
90	2019–20	18 January 2020	Nové Město, Czech Republic	10 km Individual F	World Cup	3rd
91	2019–20	9 February 2020	Falun, Sweden	10 km Mass Start F	World Cup	3rd
92	2019–20	15 February 2020	Östersund, Sweden	10 km Individual F	Stage World Cup	2nd
93	2019–20	16 February 2020	Östersund, Sweden	10 km Pursuit C	Stage World Cup	2nd
94	2019–20	18 February 2020	Åre, Sweden	0.7 km Sprint F	Stage World Cup	2nd
95	2019–20	20 February 2020	Meråker, Norway	34 km Mass Start F	Stage World Cup	3rd
96	2019–20	15–23 February 2020	(Sweden) (Norway) FIS Ski Tour 2020	Overall Standings	World Cup	2nd
97	2020–21	23 January 2021	Lahti, Finland	7.5 km + 7.5 km Skiathlon C/F	World Cup	3rd
98	2020–21	13 March 2021	Engadin, Switzerland	10 km Mass Start C	World Cup	2nd
99	2020–21	14 March 2021	Engadin, Switzerland	30 km Pursuit F	World Cup	1st
100	2021–22	28 November 2021	Rukatunturi, Finland	10 km Pursuit F	World Cup	3rd
101	2021–22	3 January 2022	Val di Fiemme, Italy	10 km Mass Start C	Stage World Cup	2nd
102	2021–22	4 January 2022	Val di Fiemme, Italy	10 km Mass Start F	Stage World Cup	1st
103	2021–22	28 December 2021 – 4 January 2022	(Switzerland) (Germany) (Italy) Tour de Ski	Overall Standings	World Cup	3rd
104	2022–23	2 December 2022	Lillehammer, Norway	10 km Individual F	World Cup	3rd
105	2022–23	8 January 2023	Val di Fiemme, Italy	10 km Mass Start F	Stage World Cup	2nd
106	2023–24	10 December 2023	Östersund, Sweden	10 km Individual F	World Cup	2nd
107	2023–24	16 December 2023	Trondheim, Norway	10 km + 10 km Skiathlon C/F	World Cup	3rd
108	2023–24	7 January 2024	Val di Fiemme, Italy	10 km Mass Start F	Stage World Cup	2nd
109	2023–24	30 December 2023 – 7 January 2024	(Italy) (Switzerland) Tour de Ski	Overall Standings	World Cup	2nd
110	2023–24	9 February 2024	Canmore, Canada	15 km Mass Start F	World Cup	3rd
111	2023–24	11 February 2024	Canmore, Canada	20 km Mass Start C	World Cup	3rd
112	2023–24	17 March 2024	Falun, Sweden	20 km Mass Start F	World Cup	2nd
113	2024–25	1 December 2024	Rukatunturi, Finland	20 km Mass Start F	World Cup	3rd
114	2024–25	6 December 2024	Lillehammer, Norway	10 km Individual F	World Cup	2nd
115	2024–25	8 December 2024	Lillehammer, Norway	10 km + 10 km Skiathlon C/F	World Cup	2nd
116	2024–25	3 January 2025	Val di Fiemme, Italy	1.2 km Sprint C	Stage World Cup	3rd
117	2024–25	5 January 2025	Val di Fiemme, Italy	10 km Mass Start F	Stage World Cup	3rd
118	2024–25	15 February 2025	Falun, Sweden	10 km Individual C	World Cup	2nd
119	2024–25	16 February 2025	Falun, Sweden	20 km Mass Start F	World Cup	2nd
120	2024–25	16 March 2025	Oslo, Norway	10 km Individual F	World Cup	2nd
121	2025–26	28 November 2025	Rukatunturi, Finland	10 km Individual C	World Cup	2nd
122	2025–26	30 November 2025	Rukatunturi, Finland	20 km Mass Start F	World Cup	3rd
123	2025–26	6 December 2025	Trondheim, Norway	10 km + 10 km Skiathlon C/F	World Cup	2nd
124	2025–26	4 January 2026	Val di Fiemme, Italy	10 km Mass Start F	Stage World Cup	3rd
125	2025–26	28 December 2025 – 4 January 2026	(Italy) Tour de Ski	Overall Standings	World Cup	3rd
126	2025–26	1 March 2026	Falun, Sweden	10 km + 10 km Skiathlon C/F	World Cup	1st
127	2025–26	20 March 2026	(United States) Lake Placid, USA	10 km Individual C	World Cup	3rd
128	2025–26	22 March 2026	(United States) Lake Placid, USA	20 km Mass Start F	World Cup	3rd

==== Team podiums ====
- 12 victories – (12 RL)
- 18 podiums – (17 RL, 1 TS)

No.	Season	Date	Location	Race	Level	Place	Teammate(s)
1	2011–12	12 February 2012	Nové Město, Czech Republic	4 × 5 km Relay C/F	World Cup	3rd	Haga / Kristoffersen / Østberg
2	2012–13	20 January 2013	La Clusaz, France	4 × 5 km Relay C/F	World Cup	1st	Johaug / Steira / Bjørgen
3	2013–14	8 December 2013	Lillehammer, Norway	4 × 5 km Relay C/F	World Cup	1st	Johaug / Steira / Bjørgen
4	2015–16	6 December 2015	Lillehammer, Norway	4 × 5 km Relay C/F	World Cup	1st	Falla / Østberg / Johaug
5	2015–16	17 January 2016	Planica, Slovenia	6 × 1.2 km Team Sprint F	World Cup	2nd	Jacobsen
6	2015–16	24 January 2016	Nové Město, Czech Republic	4 × 5 km Relay C/F	World Cup	1st	Østberg / Johaug / Jacobsen
7	2016–17	18 December 2016	La Clusaz, France	4 × 5 km Relay C/F	World Cup	1st	Østberg / Bjørgen / Haga
8	2016–17	22 January 2017	Ulricehamn, Sweden	4 × 5 km Relay C/F	World Cup	1st	Østberg / Jacobsen / Bjørgen
9	2018–19	9 December 2018	Beitostølen, Norway	4 × 5 km Relay C/F	World Cup	1st	Johaug / Haga / Østberg
10	2018–19	27 January 2019	Ulricehamn, Sweden	4 × 5 km Relay C/F	World Cup	1st	Johaug / Jacobsen / Østberg
11	2019–20	8 December 2019	Lillehammer, Norway	4 × 5 km Relay C/F	World Cup	1st	Falla / Jacobsen / Johaug
12	2019–20	1 March 2020	Lahti, Finland	4 × 5 km Relay C/F	World Cup	1st	Udnes Weng / Østberg / Johaug
13	2020–21	24 January 2021	Lahti, Finland	4 × 5 km Relay C/F	World Cup	1st	Udnes Weng / Johaug / Fossesholm
14	2021–22	5 December 2021	Lillehammer, Norway	4 × 5 km Relay C/F	World Cup	3rd	T. Udnes Weng / Johaug / Fossesholm
15	2021–22	13 March 2022	Falun, Sweden	4 × 5 km Mixed Relay F	World Cup	3rd	Holund / Tønseth / Johaug
16	2022–23	11 December 2022	Beitostølen, Norway	4 × 5 km Mixed Relay C/F	World Cup	2nd	Kalvå / Nyenget / Iversen
17	2022–23	5 February 2023	Toblach, Italy	4 × 7.5 km Relay C/F	World Cup	1st	Kalvå / Østberg / Theodorsen
18	2022–23	19 March 2023	Falun, Sweden	4 × 5 km Mixed Relay C/F	World Cup	2nd	Nyenget / Krüger / Kalvå
