= 2016 Tour de Ski =

Cross-country skiing event

Tour de Ski
2015–16 FIS Cross-Country World Cup

Ski tour details
- Venue(s): Lenzerheide, Switzerland; Oberstdorf, Germany; Toblach, Italy; Val di Fiemme, Italy
- Dates: 1 January 2016 – 10 January 2016
- Stages: 8

Results
Men
Jersey awarded to the men's overall winner	Winner	Martin Johnsrud Sundby (NOR)
	Second	Finn Hågen Krogh (NOR)
	Third	Sergey Ustiugov (RUS)
Jersey awarded to the men's sprint classification winner	Sprint	Martin Johnsrud Sundby (NOR)
Women
Jersey awarded to the women's overall winner	Winner	Therese Johaug (NOR)
	Second	Ingvild Flugstad Østberg (NOR)
	Third	Heidi Weng (NOR)
Jersey awarded to the women's sprint classification winner	Sprint	Ingvild Flugstad Østberg (NOR)

The 2016 Tour de Ski was the 10th edition of the Tour de Ski. The Stage World Cup event began in Lenzerheide, Switzerland on January 1, 2016, and ended in Val di Fiemme, Italy on January 10, 2016. The cups were being defended by Marit Bjørgen (Norway) and Petter Northug (Norway).

== Schedule ==
Stage	Venue	Date	Event	Technique	Distance		Start time (CET)	
Stage	Venue	Date	Event	Technique	Women	Men	Women	Men
1	Lenzerheide (SUI)	1 January 2016	Sprint	Freestyle	1.5 km	1.5 km	15:55	16:21
2	Lenzerheide (SUI)	2 January 2016	Distance, mass start	Classic	15 km	30 km	13:00	15:00
3	Lenzerheide (SUI)	3 January 2015	Distance, pursuit	Freestyle	5 km	10 km	11:45	13:20
4	Oberstdorf (GER)	5 January 2016	Sprint	Classic	1.2 km	1.2 km	14:30	14:30
5	Oberstdorf (GER)	6 January 2016	Distance, mass start	Classic	10 km	15 km	14:20	15:20
6	Toblach (ITA)	8 January 2016	Distance, interval start	Freestyle	5 km	10 km	13:30	11:30
7	Val di Fiemme (ITA)	9 January 2016	Distance, mass start	Classic	10 km	15 km	12:30	14:30
8	Val di Fiemme (ITA)	10 January 2016	Final Climb, pursuit	Freestyle	9 km	9 km	14:00	15:40

== Overall leadership ==
Overall leadership by stage
Stage	Men			Women		
Stage	Winner	Overall standings	Sprint standings	Winner	Overall standings	Sprint standings
1	Federico Pellegrino	Federico Pellegrino	Federico Pellegrino	Maiken Caspersen Falla	Maiken Caspersen Falla	Maiken Caspersen Falla
2	Martin Johnsrud Sundby	Martin Johnsrud Sundby	Martin Johnsrud Sundby	Therese Johaug	Therese Johaug	Ingvild Flugstad Østberg
3	Martin Johnsrud Sundby	Martin Johnsrud Sundby	Martin Johnsrud Sundby	Ingvild Flugstad Østberg	Ingvild Flugstad Østberg	Ingvild Flugstad Østberg
4	Emil Iversen	Martin Johnsrud Sundby	Martin Johnsrud Sundby	Sophie Caldwell	Ingvild Flugstad Østberg	Ingvild Flugstad Østberg
5	Alexey Poltoranin	Martin Johnsrud Sundby	Martin Johnsrud Sundby	Therese Johaug	Ingvild Flugstad Østberg	Ingvild Flugstad Østberg
6	Finn Hågen Krogh	Martin Johnsrud Sundby	Martin Johnsrud Sundby	Jessie Diggins	Ingvild Flugstad Østberg	Ingvild Flugstad Østberg
7	Martin Johnsrud Sundby	Martin Johnsrud Sundby	Martin Johnsrud Sundby	Heidi Weng	Ingvild Flugstad Østberg	Ingvild Flugstad Østberg
8	Martin Johnsrud Sundby	Martin Johnsrud Sundby	Martin Johnsrud Sundby	Therese Johaug	Therese Johaug	Ingvild Flugstad Østberg
Final		Martin Johnsrud Sundby	Martin Johnsrud Sundby	Final	Therese Johaug	Ingvild Flugstad Østberg

== Final standings ==
Legend
Denotes the winner of the Overall standings	Denotes the winner of the Sprint standings

=== Overall standings ===
==== Men ====
Final overall standings (1–10)
Rank	Name	Time
1	Martin Johnsrud Sundby (NOR)	3:47:18.2
2	Finn Hågen Krogh (NOR)	+3:15.7
3	Sergey Ustiugov (RUS)	+3:43.8
4	Petter Northug (NOR)	+4:35.6
5	Alexey Poltoranin (KAZ)	+4:38.3
6	Sjur Røthe (NOR)	+4:58.1
7	Didrik Tønseth (NOR)	+5:44.4
8	Niklas Dyrhaug (NOR)	+5:51.8
9	Francesco de Fabiani (ITA)	+6:26.2
10	Emil Iversen (NOR)	+6:33.4

Final overall standings (11–52)
Rank	Name	Time
11	Evgeniy Belov (RUS)	+6:39.4
12	Alexander Legkov (RUS)	+6:46.8
13	Maurice Manificat (FRA)	+6:56.5
14	Alex Harvey (CAN)	+6:57.3
15	Hans Christer Holund (NOR)	+7:24.7
16	Andreas Katz (GER)	+8:40.9
17	Jonas Dobler (GER)	+8:51.4
18	Matti Heikkinen (FIN)	+8:53.1
19	Martin Jakš (CZE)	+9:36.6
20	Jonas Baumann (SUI)	+10:10.6
21	Jean-Marc Gaillard (FRA)	+10:41.8
22	Noah Hoffman (USA)	+10:44.3
23	Toni Livers (SUI)	+11:04.7
24	Alexander Bessmertnykh (RUS)	+11:06.2
25	Maxim Vylegzhanin (RUS)	+11:15.9
26	Andrey Larkov (RUS)	+11:28.7
27	Giandomenico Salvadori (ITA)	+11:50.0
28	Stanislav Volzhentsev (RUS)	+12:07.7
29	Ivan Babikov (CAN)	+12:42.2
30	Curdin Perl (SUI)	+13:30.3
31	Robin Duvillard (FRA)	+13:31.7
32	Devon Kershaw (CAN)	+13:47.7
33	Simon Andersson (SWE)	+14:22.1
34	Adrien Backscheider (FRA)	+14:28.6
35	Paul Constantin Pepene (ROU)	+14:39.7
36	Sami Jauhojärvi (FIN)	+14:54.4
37	Oskar Svensson (SWE)	+15:20.5
38	Jens Burman (SWE)	+15:54.8
39	Lucas Bögl (GER)	+15:59.6
40	Andrew Musgrave (GBR)	+17:29.6
41	Erik Bjornsen (USA)	+17:51.4
42	Veselin Tsinzov (BUL)	+17:54.7
43	Philipp Hälg (LIE)	+18:45.4
44	Ristomatti Hakola (FIN)	+19:13.7
45	Mattia Pellegrin (ITA)	+19:39.0
46	Roland Clara (ITA)	+20:52.9
47	Anssi Pentsinen (FIN)	+21:35.2
48	Konstantin Glavatskikh (RUS)	+21:41.1
49	Karel Tammjärv (EST)	+22:51.6
50	Raido Rankel (EST)	+23:06.3
51	Carl Quicklund (SWE)	+25:02.8
52	Michail Semenov (BLR)	+25:08.1

==== Women ====
Final overall standings (1–10)
Rank	Name	Time
1	Therese Johaug (NOR)	2:40:34.8
2	Ingvild Flugstad Østberg (NOR)	+2:20.9
3	Heidi Weng (NOR)	+3:13.9
4	Charlotte Kalla (SWE)	+7:45.4
5	Kerttu Niskanen (FIN)	+7:52.0
6	Ragnhild Haga (NOR)	+8:29.7
7	Anne Kyllönen (FIN)	+8:46.2
8	Krista Pärmäkoski (FIN)	+9:13.9
9	Laura Mononen (FIN)	+10:53.1
10	Jessie Diggins (USA)	+11:20.4

Final overall standings (11–43)
Rank	Name	Time
11	Teresa Stadlober (AUT)	+11:30.7
12	Ida Ingemarsdotter (SWE)	+12:11.5
13	Maria Rydqvist (SWE)	+12:19.6
14	Sadie Bjornsen (USA)	+12:24.1
15	Nathalie von Siebenthal (SUI)	+12:37.7
16	Stefanie Böhler (GER)	+12:38.7
17	Virginia De Martin Topranin (ITA)	+13:16.9
18	Kari Øyre Slind (NOR)	+13:23.6
19	Elizabeth Stephen (USA)	+13:27.8
20	Sandra Ringwald (GER)	+13:38.4
21	Anna Haag (SWE)	+13:40.0
22	Denise Herrmann (GER)	+14:05.2
23	Justyna Kowalczyk (POL)	+14:45.0
24	Stina Nilsson (SWE)	+15:43.6
25	Anastasia Dotsenko (RUS)	+16:11.9
26	Polina Kalsina (RUS)	+17:28.3
27	Daria Storozhilova (RUS)	+17:58.7
28	Monique Siegel (GER)	+18:07.2
29	Anouk Faivre Picon (FRA)	+18:35.3
30	Elena Soboleva (RUS)	+19:38.5
31	Nathalie Schwarz (AUT)	+20:02.8
32	Rosie Brennan (USA)	+20:06.1
33	Evelina Settlin (SWE)	+21:37.9
34	Lea Einfalt (SLO)	+22:19.3
35	Lucia Scardoni (ITA)	+22:48.5
36	Susanna Saapunki (FIN)	+23:05.9
37	Yulia Tikhonova (BLR)	+23:34.9
38	Debora Agreiter (ITA)	+23:43.6
39	Alisa Zhambalova (RUS)	+23:47.7
40	Natalja Iljina (RUS)	+23:53.8
41	Anna Povaliaeva (RUS)	+23:55.9
42	Caitlin Gregg (USA)	+23:57.6
43	Olga Repnitsyna (RUS)	+24:43.8

=== Sprint standings ===
==== Men ====
Final sprint standings (1–10)
Rank	Name	Time
1	Martin Johnsrud Sundby (NOR)	3:57
2	Finn Hågen Krogh (NOR)	2:22
3	Petter Northug (NOR)	2:22
4	Sergey Ustiugov (RUS)	2:14
5	Didrik Tønseth (NOR)	1:53
6	Alexey Poltoranin (KAZ)	1:38
7	Dario Cologna (SUI)	1:24
8	Emil Iversen (NOR)	1:11
9	Ristomatti Hakola (FIN)	1:10
10	Alex Harvey (CAN)	0:50

==== Women ====
Final sprint standings (1–10)
Rank	Name	Time
1	Ingvild Flugstad Østberg (NOR)	3:25
2	Therese Johaug (NOR)	2:42
3	Heidi Weng (NOR)	2:23
4	Ida Ingemarsdotter (SWE)	1:50
5	Stina Nilsson (SWE)	1:28
6	Krista Pärmäkoski (FIN)	1:05
7	Jessie Diggins (USA)	1:03
8	Sandra Ringwald (GER)	0:53
9	Ragnhild Haga (NOR)	0:49
10	Anne Kyllönen (FIN)	0:48

== Stages ==
=== Stage 1 ===
1 January 2016, Lenzerheide, Switzerland

Men – 1.5 km Sprint Freestyle
Rank	Name	Time
1	Federico Pellegrino (ITA)	2:43.14
2	Sergey Ustiugov (RUS)	+0.40
3	Finn Hågen Krogh (NOR)	+1.25
4	Martin Johnsrud Sundby (NOR)	+10.09
5	Emil Jönsson (SWE)	+12.27
6	Dario Cologna (SUI)	+59.01

Women – 1.5 km Sprint Freestyle
Rank	Name	Time
1	Maiken Caspersen Falla (NOR)	3:06.7
2	Ida Ingemarsdotter (SWE)	+0.4
3	Ingvild Flugstad Østberg (NOR)	+0.54
4	Sophie Caldwell (USA)	+1.03
5	Astrid Uhrenholdt Jacobsen (NOR)	+1.09
6	Stina Nilsson (SWE)	+2.33

=== Stage 2 ===
2 January 2016, Lenzerheide, Switzerland

Men – 30 km Classic (mass start)
Rank	Name	Time
1	Martin Johnsrud Sundby (NOR)	1:14:48.3
2	Petter Northug (NOR)	+34.6
3	Didrik Tønseth (NOR)	+35.1
4	Sjur Røthe (NOR)	+35.6
5	Alexey Poltoranin (KAZ)	+36.8

Women – 15 km Classic (mass start)
Rank	Name	Time
1	Therese Johaug (NOR)	41:26.4
2	Ingvild Flugstad Østberg (NOR)	+37.9
3	Heidi Weng (NOR)	+1:16.2
4	Anne Kyllönen (FIN)	+1:32.7
5	Kerttu Niskanen (FIN)	+1:32.9

=== Stage 3 ===
3 January 2016, Lenzerheide, Switzerland

Men – 10 km Freestyle (pursuit)
Rank	Name	Time
1	Martin Johnsrud Sundby (NOR)	21:44.7
2	Petter Northug (NOR)	+1:25.2
3	Finn Hågen Krogh (NOR)	+1:50.2
4	Sergey Ustiugov (RUS)	+1:50.2
5	Sjur Røthe (NOR)	+1:52.9

Women – 5 km Freestyle (pursuit)
Rank	Name	Time
1	Ingvild Flugstad Østberg (NOR)	13:02.3
2	Therese Johaug (NOR)	+9.3
3	Heidi Weng (NOR)	+2:03.6
4	Charlotte Kalla (SWE)	+2:30.8
5	Anne Kyllönen (FIN)	+2:37.2

=== Stage 4 ===
5 January 2016, Oberstdorf, Germany

Men – 1.2 km Sprint Classic
Rank	Name	Time
1	Emil Iversen (NOR)	2:25.21
2	Sergey Ustiugov (RUS)	+1.03
3	Alexey Poltoranin (KAZ)	+1.40
4	Martin Johnsrud Sundby (NOR)	+4.86
5	Petter Northug (NOR)	+10.32
6	Sebastian Eisenlauer (GER)	+14.19

Women – 1.2 km Sprint Classic
Rank	Name	Time
1	Sophie Caldwell (USA)	2:46.38
2	Heidi Weng (NOR)	+0.10
3	Ingvild Flugstad Østberg (NOR)	+0.80
4	Ida Ingemarsdotter (SWE)	+3.95
5	Therese Johaug (NOR)	+4.71
6	Stina Nilsson (SWE)	+27.43

=== Stage 5 ===
6 January 2016, Oberstdorf, Germany

Men – 15 km Classic (mass start)
Rank	Name	Time
1	Alexey Poltoranin (KAZ)	35:35.9
2	Dario Cologna (SUI)	+0.1
3	Francesco de Fabiani (ITA)	+0.6
4	Niklas Dyrhaug (NOR)	+0.7
5	Didrik Tønseth (NOR)	+1.3

Women – 10 km Classic (mass start)
Rank	Name	Time
1	Therese Johaug (NOR)	26:37.6
2	Ingvild Flugstad Østberg (NOR)	+9.9
3	Heidi Weng (NOR)	+19.7
4	Ragnhild Haga (NOR)	+1:12.0
5	Anne Kyllönen (FIN)	+1:12.7

=== Stage 6 ===
8 January 2016, Toblach, Italy

Men – 10 km Freestyle (individual)
Rank	Name	Time
1	Finn Hågen Krogh (NOR)	22:07.8
2	Martin Johnsrud Sundby (NOR)	+3.6
3	Maurice Manificat (FRA)	+14.6
4	Sergey Ustiugov (RUS)	+16.0
5	Hans Christer Holund (NOR)	+18.0

Women – 5 km Freestyle (individual)
Rank	Name	Time
1	Jessie Diggins (USA)	13:15.5
2	Heidi Weng (NOR)	+0.9
3	Ingvild Flugstad Østberg (NOR)	+1.5
4	Ragnhild Haga (NOR)	+8.4
5	Therese Johaug (NOR)	+9.6

=== Stage 7 ===
9 January 2016, Val di Fiemme, Italy

Men – 15 km Classic (mass start)
Rank	Name	Time
1	Martin Johnsrud Sundby (NOR)	39:55.2
2	Niklas Dyrhaug (NOR)	+7.7
3	Alexey Poltoranin (KAZ)	+12.6
4	Francesco de Fabiani (ITA)	+30.2
5	Finn Hågen Krogh (NOR)	+30.9

Women – 10 km Classic (mass start)
Rank	Name	Time
1	Heidi Weng (NOR)	29:16.3
2	Ingvild Flugstad Østberg (NOR)	+0.8
3	Therese Johaug (NOR)	+6.2
4	Krista Pärmäkoski (FIN)	+17.4
5	Charlotte Kalla (SWE)	+55.1

=== Stage 8 ===
10 January 2016, Val di Fiemme, Italy

Men – 9 km Final Climb Freestyle (pursuit)
Rank	Name	Time
1	Martin Johnsrud Sundby (NOR)	30:47.0
2	Robin Duvillard (FRA)	+7.2
3	Matti Heikkinen (FIN)	+11.8
4	Finn Hågen Krogh (NOR)	+14.3
5	Evgeniy Belov (RUS)	+18.9

Women – 9 km Final Climb Freestyle (pursuit)
Rank	Name	Time
1	Therese Johaug (NOR)	33:14.8
2	Heidi Weng (NOR)	+1:25.9
3	Elizabeth Stephen (USA)	+1:29.5
4	Ragnhild Haga (NOR)	+1:36.2
5	Charlotte Kalla (SWE)	+1:38.1
