= Tour de Ski =

Annual skiing event in Europe

Coordinates: 59°57′50″N 10°40′04″E

Race details
- Date: late December – early January
- Venue(s): Central Europe; Italy
- Competition: FIS Cross-Country World Cup
- Organiser: International Ski Federation

History
- First edition: 31 December 2006; 19 years ago
- Editions: 20 (as of 2026)

Men
- First winner: Tobias Angerer (GER)
- Most wins: Johannes Høsflot Klæbo (NOR) (5 wins)
- Most recent: Johannes Høsflot Klæbo (NOR)

Ladies
- First winner: Virpi Kuitunen (FIN)
- Most wins: Justyna Kowalczyk (POL); Therese Johaug (NOR) (4 wins)
- Most recent: Jessie Diggins (USA)

The Tour de Ski (TdS) is a cross-country skiing event held annually since the 2006–07 season in Central Europe. The Tour de Ski is a Stage World Cup event in the FIS Cross-Country World Cup. Each Tour de Ski has consisted of six to nine stages, held during late December and early January in the Czech Republic, Germany, Italy, and Switzerland. As of 2023, the prize money for the event is 770,000 Swiss francs (779,000 euros), shared out on both men and women. Men's and women's events are held together on the same days, with the only difference being the distance skied.

The stage hosts changes every year, but some of the format stays the same with the diversity of competitions; sprints, mass starts, races with individual starts and pursuits. The Tour de Ski has every year concluded with two or three stages in Val di Fiemme, with the final stage where the skiers race up the alpine skiing course on Alpe Cermis in Cavalese.

There are usually between 20 and 30 nations participating, with the numbers of skiers from each nation based on quotas with a maximum of 10 skiers. All of the stages are timed to the finish; the skiers' times are compounded with their previous stage times. The skier with the lowest cumulative finishing times is the overall leader of the race and wears the yellow leader bib. While the overall standings garners the most attention, there are two other contests held within the Tour: the point standings (previously called "sprint standings") for the sprinters and the climbing standings for skiers, who are the first on certain hill summits.

== History ==
=== Origins ===
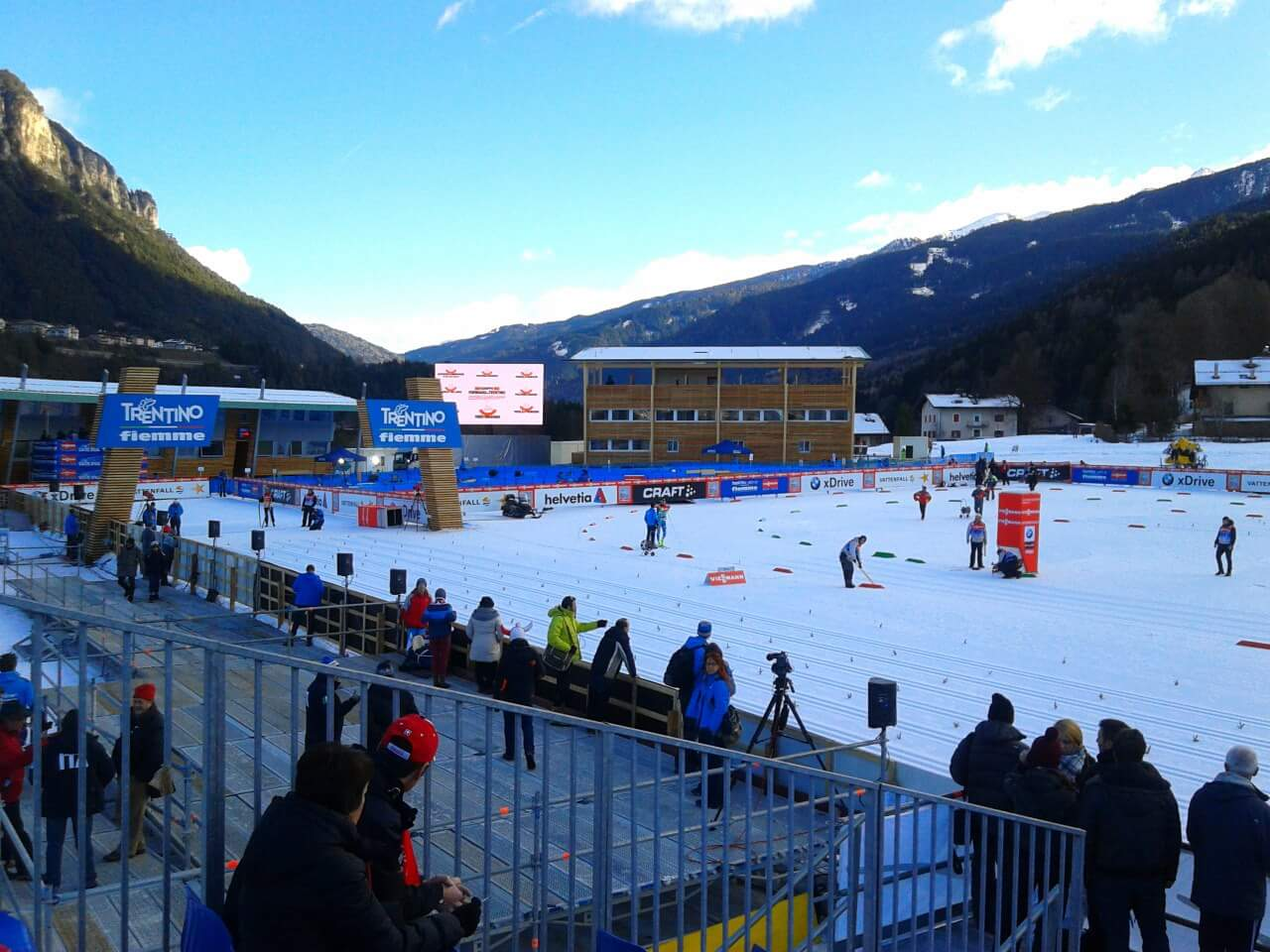
Tour de Ski 2013 at Lago di Tesero Cross Country Stadium, Val di Fiemme, Italy

Cross-country skiing had been through a period of renewal from the early 1980s, when the free technique was first introduced to the World Championships which led to a rush of new events, including pursuit skiing, sprint skiing and eventually long mass start races, to complement the traditional time trial or individual start style of skiing. The Tour de Ski is another such new event, and the idea has been reported to come from a meeting between former Olympic gold medallist Vegard Ulvang and Jürg Capol, the International Ski Federation's (FIS) chief executive officer for cross-country competitions, in Ulvang's sauna in Maridalen, Norway. Their idea was to create a stage competition consisting of different events which they expected would lead to several days of continuous excitement before the most complete skiers would become Tour de Ski champions. Ulvang has also brought up the idea of a tour of the Barents Region, Tour de Barents, with stages in Kirkenes (Sandnes) and Vadsø in Finnmark and Murmansk in Russia.

=== The first Tour de Ski (2006–07) ===
Jürg Capol stated that FIS originally wished to start the race in the Alps. However, as neither Austria or Switzerland were interested, the opening two stages were to be held in Nové Město na Moravě in the Czech Republic. A week before the Tour was due to start, FIS announced that snow conditions in Nové Město were not good enough, and cancelled the two races there. The first Tour de Ski therefore opened with a sprint race in Munich on 31 December 2006, and was won by Marit Bjørgen (NOR) and Christoph Eigenmann (SUI).

Skiers from France, Germany and Norway, among others, said that the Tour de Ski was among their targets for the 2006–07 season, with Norwegian skier Jens Arne Svartedal claiming that the winner would have "extreme respect" for winning such an extreme race. Tobias Angerer (GER) and Virpi Kuitunen (FIN) were the first overall winners of the Tour.

After the first Tour de Ski, reactions among athletes were largely positive. Norwegian athletes said "it was a good concept", German winner Tobias Angerer claimed that the Tour de Ski "has a great future", though many of the athletes expressed concern over the final climb up an alpine skiing hill both before and after the race. The director of FIS' cross-country committee, Vegard Ulvang, said the finish would be in the same place next year, but the way up could be changed. Ulvang also claimed that the Tour had been a success, and a "breakthrough for FIS" Ulvang did, however, admit that there would have to be some changes, as up to a third of participants in the Tour de Ski have struggled with illness or injury after the competition.

Newspaper comments were divided: in Expressen's opinion, the finish was the "most enjoyable competition seen in years," while Roland Wiedemann in Der Spiegel said this "should be the future of cross-country skiing". Critical commentaries appeared in Göteborgs-Posten, criticising the fact that sprinters didn't have a chance in the overall standings, and Wiesbaden Kurier, describing it as a reality show and a skiing circus.

=== Since 2007 ===
The second Tour de Ski was held between 28 December 2007 and 6 January 2008, in the Czech Republic and Italy. Oberstdorf in Bavaria was originally scheduled to host two stages, but cancelled as the German Ski Association could only arrange a race on 2 January.

At a meeting in Venice, Italy, on 7 May 2009, Tour de Ski officials met with officials from the Giro d'Italia road cycle race to learn from the stage race to further improve Tour de Ski competition for the 2009–2010 event.

In the late 2000s and early 2010s, the women's Tour was dominated by Justyna Kowalczyk, who won the Tour de Ski four consecutive times and the sprint standings three consecutive times and a record 14 stages. Dario Cologna dominated the same period of time and won three Tours and two sprint competitions in four years from 2008–09 to 2011–12. In 2017–18, the season Cologna won his record fourth overall Tour, Alex Harvey of Canada and Jessie Diggins of USA became the first non-Europeans to achieve podium spot for men and women respectively in the overall standings. In 2021 Diggins became the first non-European to win Tour de Ski.

== Race structure ==
=== Ranking ===
Bonus seconds for the top 30 positions by type
Type		1	2	3	4	5	6	7	8	9	10	11	12	13–15	16–20	21–25	26–30
In finish	Interval start	none															
In finish	Mass start	none															
In finish	Pursuit	none															
In finish	Sprint	60	54	48	46	44	42	32	30	28	26	24	22	10	8	6	4
Intermediate sprint	Mass Start	15	12	10	8	6	5	4	3	2	1	none					

The overall results are based on the aggregate time for all events, as well as bonus seconds awarded on sprint and mass start stages.

The sprint races carry bonus seconds for the finish, which are subtracted from the overall time. The current bonus format in sprint competitions, as of 2022–23, hands out bonus seconds to the 30 skiers that qualify for the quarter-finals (60–54–48–46–44–42–32–30–28–26–24–22–10–10–10–8–8–8–8–8–6–6–6–6–6–4–4–4–4–4).

In mass start competitions, intermediate points carry bonus seconds; 15 to the winner, 10 to number two, and 5 to number three. The same number of seconds used to be usually awarded at the finish, but not anymore. In the later editions of the Tour, intermediate points has been handed out to the 10 first skiers (15–12–10–8–6–5–4–3–2–1) past the intermediate point.

The final stage of the race includes a steep climb up Alpe Cermis, with a height difference of 425 meters. By the 2018–19 Tour de Ski this last stage was held in a pursuit format, with competitors starting with the gaps they had in the overall classification, so the first skier to reach the top was the overall winner. Since 2019–20 Tour de Ski the Final Climb is held in a mass start format, with stage results added to overall classification.

=== Bibs ===
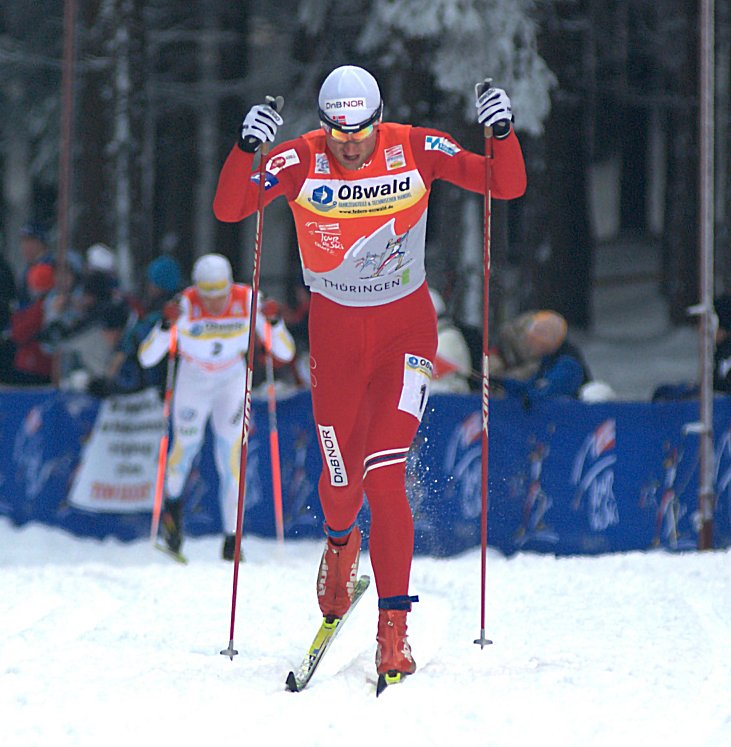
Petter Northug in the red overall leader bib during the 2009–10 Tour de Ski.

The overall leaders wear the leader bib on the following stage. The leader bib is from the 2019–20 edition colored yellow. From the start in 2006 to 2017–18 the leader bib was red and in the 2018–19 the leader wore a blue bib. Since the edition 2023–24 leaders of the general classification wear a gold bib.

The leaders of the points competitions wear the points bib on the following stage. The bib worn by the leader of the points standings is from the 2019–20 edition colored red. In the previous editions of the Tour, the leader of the sprint standings wore a sprint bib; from the start in 2006 to 2017–18 this bib was black and in the 2018–19 the sprint bib was grey. Since the edition 2023–24 leaders of the points classification wear a silver bib.

Since the edition 2024-2025 there is a climbing classification for skiers, who are the first on the top of particular hills. The leaders of the climbing classifications wear the violet bib on the following stage.

=== Prizes ===
Prizes and bonuses are awarded for daily placings and final placings at the end of the race. In 2023, the winners received CHF 80,000, while each of the stage winners won CHF 3,000. The winners of the points and climbing standings won CHF 6,000.

== Winners by year ==
=== Men ===
Year	Overall			Sprint/Points
Year	1st	2nd	3rd	Sprint/Points
2006–07	Tobias Angerer (GER)	Alexander Legkov (RUS)	Simen Østensen (NOR)	Tor Arne Hetland (NOR)
2007–08	Lukáš Bauer (CZE)	René Sommerfeldt (GER)	Giorgio Di Centa (ITA)	Petter Northug (NOR)
2008–09	Dario Cologna (SUI)	Petter Northug (NOR)	Axel Teichmann (GER)	Tor Arne Hetland (NOR)
2009–10	Lukáš Bauer (CZE)	Petter Northug (NOR)	Dario Cologna (SUI)	Petter Northug (NOR)
2010–11	Dario Cologna (SUI)	Petter Northug (NOR)	Lukáš Bauer (CZE)	Dario Cologna (SUI)
2011–12	Dario Cologna (SUI)	Marcus Hellner (SWE)	Petter Northug (NOR)	Dario Cologna (SUI)
2012–13	Alexander Legkov (RUS)	Dario Cologna (SUI)	Maxim Vylegzhanin (RUS)	Petter Northug (NOR)
2013–14	Martin Johnsrud Sundby (NOR)	Chris Jespersen (NOR)	Petter Northug (NOR)	Martin Johnsrud Sundby (NOR)
2015	Petter Northug (NOR)	Evgeniy Belov (RUS)	Calle Halfvarsson (SWE)	Petter Northug (NOR)
2016	Martin Johnsrud Sundby (NOR)	Finn Hågen Krogh (NOR)	Sergey Ustiugov (RUS)	Martin Johnsrud Sundby (NOR)
2016–17	Sergey Ustiugov (RUS)	Martin Johnsrud Sundby (NOR)	Dario Cologna (SUI)	Sergey Ustiugov (RUS)
2017–18	Dario Cologna (SUI)	Martin Johnsrud Sundby (NOR)	Alex Harvey (CAN)	Dario Cologna (SUI)
2018–19	Johannes Høsflot Klæbo (NOR)	Sergey Ustiugov (RUS)	Simen Hegstad Krüger (NOR)	Johannes Høsflot Klæbo (NOR)
2019–20	Alexander Bolshunov (RUS)	Sergey Ustiugov (RUS)	Johannes Høsflot Klæbo (NOR)	Johannes Høsflot Klæbo (NOR)
2021	Alexander Bolshunov (RUS)	Maurice Manificat (FRA)	Denis Spitsov (RUS)	Alexander Bolshunov (RUS)
2021–22	Johannes Høsflot Klæbo (NOR)	Alexander Bolshunov (RUS)	Iivo Niskanen (FIN)	Johannes Høsflot Klæbo (NOR)
2022–23	Johannes Høsflot Klæbo (NOR)	Simen Hegstad Krüger (NOR)	Hans Christer Holund (NOR)	Johannes Høsflot Klæbo (NOR)
2023–24	Harald Østberg Amundsen (NOR)	Friedrich Moch (GER)	Hugo Lapalus (FRA)	Lucas Chanavat (FRA)
2024–25	Johannes Høsflot Klæbo (NOR)	Mika Vermeulen (AUT)	Hugo Lapalus (FRA)	Johannes Høsflot Klæbo (NOR)
2025–26	Johannes Høsflot Klæbo (NOR)	Mattis Stenshagen (NOR)	Harald Østberg Amundsen (NOR)	Johannes Høsflot Klæbo (NOR)

=== Women ===
Year	Overall			Sprint/Points
Year	1st	2nd	3rd	Sprint/Points
2006–07	Virpi Kuitunen (FIN)	Marit Bjørgen (NOR)	Valentina Shevchenko (UKR)	Virpi Kuitunen (FIN)
2007–08	Charlotte Kalla (SWE)	Virpi Kuitunen (FIN)	Arianna Follis (ITA)	Virpi Kuitunen (FIN)
2008–09	Virpi Kuitunen (FIN)	Aino-Kaisa Saarinen (FIN)	Petra Majdič (SLO)	Petra Majdič (SLO)
2009–10	Justyna Kowalczyk (POL)	Petra Majdič (SLO)	Arianna Follis (ITA)	Petra Majdič (SLO)
2010–11	Justyna Kowalczyk (POL)	Therese Johaug (NOR)	Marianna Longa (ITA)	Justyna Kowalczyk (POL)
2011–12	Justyna Kowalczyk (POL)	Marit Bjørgen (NOR)	Therese Johaug (NOR)	Justyna Kowalczyk (POL)
2012–13	Justyna Kowalczyk (POL)	Therese Johaug (NOR)	Kristin Størmer Steira (NOR)	Justyna Kowalczyk (POL)
2013–14	Therese Johaug (NOR)	Astrid Uhrenholdt Jacobsen (NOR)	Heidi Weng (NOR)	Astrid Uhrenholdt Jacobsen (NOR)
2015	Marit Bjørgen (NOR)	Therese Johaug (NOR)	Heidi Weng (NOR)	Marit Bjørgen (NOR)
2016	Therese Johaug (NOR)	Ingvild Flugstad Østberg (NOR)	Heidi Weng (NOR)	Ingvild Flugstad Østberg (NOR)
2016–17	Heidi Weng (NOR)	Krista Pärmäkoski (FIN)	Stina Nilsson (SWE)	Stina Nilsson (SWE)
2017–18	Heidi Weng (NOR)	Ingvild Flugstad Østberg (NOR)	Jessie Diggins (USA)	Ingvild Flugstad Østberg (NOR)
2018–19	Ingvild Flugstad Østberg (NOR)	Natalya Nepryayeva (RUS)	Krista Pärmäkoski (FIN)	Ingvild Flugstad Østberg (NOR)
2019–20	Therese Johaug (NOR)	Natalya Nepryayeva (RUS)	Ingvild Flugstad Østberg (NOR)	Anamarija Lampič (SLO)
2021	Jessie Diggins (USA)	Yuliya Stupak (RUS)	Ebba Andersson (SWE)	Linn Svahn (SWE)
2021–22	Natalya Nepryayeva (RUS)	Ebba Andersson (SWE)	Heidi Weng (NOR)	Johanna Hagström (SWE)
2022–23	Frida Karlsson (SWE)	Kerttu Niskanen (FIN)	Tiril Udnes Weng (NOR)	Tiril Udnes Weng (NOR)
2023–24	Jessie Diggins (USA)	Heidi Weng (NOR)	Kerttu Niskanen (FIN)	Linn Svahn (SWE)
2024–25	Therese Johaug (NOR)	Astrid Øyre Slind (NOR)	Jessie Diggins (USA)	Nadine Fähndrich (SUI)
2025–26	Jessie Diggins (USA)	Teresa Stadlober (AUT)	Heidi Weng (NOR)	Maja Dahlqvist (SWE)

== Stages ==
=== Mass start stages ===
In the mass start stages in the Tour de Ski, time bonuses are awarded to the top ten skiers of intermediate sprints. Since 2019–20, no bonus seconds are awarded based on the skiers finishing positions in the mass start stages. Until the 2018–19 edition, time bonuses of 15, 10 and 5 bonus seconds were usually awarded to the first three finishers. Mass-start stages are typically 5 km or 10 km for women and 10 km or 15 km for men, often raced by skiing several laps. Skiers who are overlapped by others will be excluded from the rest of the Tour. There are usually two or three mass start stages.

=== Interval start stages ===
In the interval start, or time trial stages in the Tour de Ski, skiers are sent out from the start in 30 second intervals. Interval start stages are typically 5 km or 10 km for women and 10 km or 15 km for men. Since 2019–20, no bonus seconds are awarded on the interval start stage. Time bonuses of 15, 10 and 5 bonus seconds were awarded to the three fastest skiers by the edition 2018–19. There are usually one or two interval start stages. Between 2007–08 and 2015, the first stage of the Tour was a short trial, a prologue. The first prologue was in Oberhof, Germany in 2007 and the last in Oberstdorf, Germany, on 3 January 2015.

=== Sprint stages ===
The first ever Tour de Ski stage was a sprint stage in Munich, Germany, on 31 December 2006. Sprint stages consists of two rounds; a qualification round and a final round with a knock-out competition format. The 30 fastest skiers in the qualification round qualifies for the final round quarter-finals. In the quarter-, and semi-finals, the skiers compete in heats of six and the two best skiers in each heat are guaranteed progression. 12 skiers advance from the quarter-finals to the semi-finals of which six advance to the final. The winners are rewarded, as of 2022–23, 60 bonus seconds. The amount of bonus seconds are higher in sprint races then other types to encourage sprinter specialists to go for results in the overall standings. There are usually one or two sprint stages.

=== Final Climb ===
The Tour de Ski has every year concluded with the final stage in Val di Fiemme where the skiers race up the alpine skiing course on Alpe Cermis in Cavalese. The stage's length is 9.0 km in total, the climb itself 3.6 km with an average gradient of 11.6% and a maximum gradient of 28.0%.

By the edition 2018–19, this stage was raced as a free technique pursuit with starting intervals equal to the skiers accumulative times in the overall standings; which meant that the first skier to cross the finish line on Alpe Cermis was the winner of the Tour de Ski. If the time differences were big, the race jury could decide that the lowest ranked skiers started in a «wave start». Since 2019–20, the final stage is a mass start on same course. The stage results are added to overall standings.

== Records ==
Ten skiers have won both overall and sprint/points standings in the same Tour – six men (13 times in total) and four women (6 times in total), the first being Virpi Kuitunen in the inaugural women's Tour. Johannes Høsflot Klæbo is the only skier who achieved this feat five times. Johannes Høsflot Klæbo (four times), Sergey Ustiugov and Marit Bjørgen are the only skiers who have led the overall standings from the first stage and held the lead all the way to the top of Alpe Cermis. The most appearances have been by Jean-Marc Gaillard, who skied his 15th Tour in 2021, having finished 11 of them. In 2016, Petter Northug became the first skier to complete ten Tours. The smallest margins between the winner and the second placed skiers at the end of the Tour are 7.2 seconds between Virpi Kuitunen and Aino-Kaisa Saarinen in 2008–09 (in the women's Tour) and 12.6 seconds between Petter Northug and Evgeniy Belov in 2015 (in the men's Tour). The largest margin, by comparison, remains that of the 2021 Tour: 3 min 23.9 s between Alexander Bolshunov and Maurice Manificat. The biggest winning margin in the women's Tour is 2 min 42.0 s between Ingvild Flugstad Østberg and Natalya Nepryayeva in 2018–19.

Skiers who won the Tour de Ski and an individual Olympic gold medal in the same year include: Justyna Kowalczyk (2010), Dario Cologna (2018) and Johannes Høsflot Klæbo (2022, 2026). Six skiers have won the Tour de Ski and an individual World Championship gold medal in the same year. These are: Virpi Kuitunen (2007), Marit Bjørgen (2015), Petter Northug (2015), Sergey Ustiugov (2017), Johannes Høsflot Klæbo (2019, 2023, 2025, 2026) and Alexander Bolshunov (2021).

=== Overall winners ===
Johannes Høsflot Klæbo from Norway have won the overall Tour de Ski a record five times. Three skiers have won four times: Justyna Kowalczyk (Poland), Dario Cologna (Switzerland) and Therese Johaug (Norway). Jessie Diggins from the United States have won three times. An additional three men and two women have won two times. Kowalczyk achieved the mark with a record four consecutive wins.

Men
Wins	Skier	Editions
5	Johannes Høsflot Klæbo (NOR)	2018–19, 2021–22, 2022–23, 2024–25, 2025–26
4	Dario Cologna (SUI)	2008–09, 2010–11, 2011–12, 2017–18
2	Lukáš Bauer (CZE)	2007–08, 2009–10
2	Martin Johnsrud Sundby (NOR)	2013–14, 2016
2	Alexander Bolshunov (RUS)	2019–20, 2021
1	Tobias Angerer (GER)	2006–07
1	Alexander Legkov (RUS)	2012–13
1	Petter Northug (NOR)	2015
1	Sergey Ustiugov (RUS)	2016–17
1	Harald Østberg Amundsen (NOR)	2023–24

Women
Wins	Skier	Editions
4	Justyna Kowalczyk (POL)	2009–10, 2010–11, 2011–12, 2012–13
4	Therese Johaug (NOR)	2013–14, 2016, 2019–20, 2024–25
3	Jessie Diggins (USA)	2021, 2023–24, 2025–26
2	Virpi Kuitunen (FIN)	2006–07, 2008–09
2	Heidi Weng (NOR)	2016–17, 2017–18
1	Charlotte Kalla (SWE)	2007–08
1	Marit Bjørgen (NOR)	2015
1	Ingvild Flugstad Østberg (NOR)	2018–19
1	Natalya Nepryayeva (RUS)	2021–22
1	Frida Karlsson (SWE)	2022–23

=== Stage wins ===
23 men and 21 women have won multiple stages in the Tour de Ski. Johannes Høsflot Klæbo has won the most stages with 24, followed by Therese Johaug with 16 victories and Justyna Kowalczyk with 14 stage wins. Klæbo won six consecutive stages in one edition (2022–23), which is a record. In previous editions Bjørgen (2015), Ustiugov (2016–17), and Bolshunov (2021) were able to win five consecutive stages.

Men
Pos	Name	Victories
1	Johannes Høsflot Klæbo (NOR)	24
2	Petter Northug (NOR)	13
3	Sergey Ustiugov (RUS)	9
4	Dario Cologna (SUI)	7
4	Martin Johnsrud Sundby (NOR)	7
6	Alexey Poltoranin (KAZ)	6
6	Alexander Bolshunov (RUS)	6
8	Lukáš Bauer (CZE)	5
9	Axel Teichmann (GER)	4
9	Harald Østberg Amundsen (NOR)	4
11	Eldar Rønning (NOR)	3
11	Emil Iversen (NOR)	3
11	Federico Pellegrino (ITA)	3
11	Simen Hegstad Krüger (NOR)	3
15	Emil Jönsson (SWE)	2
15	Tor Arne Hetland (NOR)	2
15	Nikolay Morilov (RUS)	2
15	Alexander Legkov (RUS)	2
15	Marcus Hellner (SWE)	2
15	Finn Hågen Krogh (NOR)	2
15	Sjur Røthe (NOR)	2
15	Lucas Chanavat (FRA)	2
15	Mattis Stenshagen (NOR)	2

Women
Pos	Name	Victories
1	Therese Johaug (NOR)	16
2	Justyna Kowalczyk (POL)	14
3	Marit Bjørgen (NOR)	11
3	Ingvild Flugstad Østberg (NOR)	11
3	Jessie Diggins (USA)	11
6	Virpi Kuitunen (FIN)	7
7	Petra Majdič (SLO)	6
7	Stina Nilsson (SWE)	6
7	Linn Svahn (SWE)	6
10	Heidi Weng (NOR)	5
11	Arianna Follis (ITA)	4
11	Natalya Nepryayeva (RUS)	4
11	Kerttu Niskanen (FIN)	4
14	Charlotte Kalla (SWE)	3
14	Astrid Øyre Slind (NOR)	3
16	Kikkan Randall (USA)	2
16	Kristin Størmer Steira (NOR)	2
16	Astrid Uhrenholdt Jacobsen (NOR)	2
16	Anamarija Lampič (SLO)	2
16	Frida Karlsson (SWE)	2
16	Nadine Fähndrich (SUI)	2

- State at 4 January 2026

=== Most successful countries ===
#	Country (Note: Standings after the 2025–26 Tour de Ski and the disqualifications of Yevgeny Dementyev (Russia) in 2008–09, Alena Sidko (Russia) in 2009–10, Johannes Dürr (Austria) in 2013–14 and Martin Johnsrud Sundby (Norway) in 2015.)	1st	2nd	3rd	4th	5th	6th	7th	8th	9th	10th
1	Norway	17	19	16	11	14	10	11	9	7	10
2	Russia	5	8	3	4	7	5	5	4	4	7
3	Switzerland	4	1	2	2	1	–	1	3	–	–
4	Poland	4	–	–	1	–	–	1	–	–	–
5	United States	3	–	2	1	2	2	3	1	2	2
6	Finland	2	4	3	8	5	5	4	3	7	2
7	Sweden	2	2	3	4	3	4	3	5	4	2
8	Czech Republic	2	–	1	–	1	3	–	2	1	3
9	Germany	1	2	1	–	1	6	2	7	5	3
10	Austria	–	2	–	–	1	1	2	–	3	3
11	France	–	1	2	1	1	2	2	1	2	4
12	Slovenia	–	1	1	–	–	2	–	–	–	–
13	Italy	–	–	4	5	3	–	2	2	4	1
14	Canada	–	–	1	1	–	–	3	–	1	1
15	Ukraine	–	–	1	1	–	–	–	–	–	–
16	Kazakhstan	–	–	–	1	1	–	1	–	–	–
–	Individual Neutral Athletes (Note: At the 2025–26 Tour de Ski, in accordance with sanctions imposed following by the 2022 Russian invasion of Ukraine, skiers from Russia were not permitted to use the name or flag of Russia. They instead participated as "Individual Neutral Athletes (AIN)", their results were not counted in the Nations Cup standings.)	–	–	–	–	–	–	–	1	–	1
17	Japan	–	–	–	–	–	–	–	1	–	1
18	Latvia	–	–	–	–	–	–	–	1	–	–

== Venues ==
Twelve venues have hosted stages of the Tour de Ski. Val di Fiemme is the only venue to host a stage in all 21 Tours.

Host \ Season	06–07	07–08	08–09	09–10	10–11	11–12	12–13	13–14	14–15	15–16	16–17	17–18	18–19	19–20	20–21	21–22	22–23	23–24	24–25	25–26	26–27
(Italy) Asiago	X	X																			
(Switzerland) Davos																		X			
(Switzerland) Lenzerheide								X		X		X		X		X					
(France) Les Rousses																					X
(Germany) Munich	X																				
(Czech Republic) Nové Město na Moravě	CNX^{1}	X^{2}	X																		
(Germany) Oberhof			X	X	X	X	X	X													
(Germany) Oberstdorf	X	CNX^{2}			X	X			X	X	X	X	X			X	X				X
(Czech Republic) Prague		X	X	X																	
(Italy) Toblach				X	X	X	X	X	X	X	X		X	X	X			X	X	X	
(Italy) Val di Fiemme	X	X	X	X	X	X	X	X	X	X	X	X	X	X	X	X	X	X	X	X	X
(Switzerland) Val Müstair							X		X		X		X		X		X				

- ^{1} Cancelled due to lack of snow
- ^{2} Relocated from Oberstdorf to Nové Město na Moravě due to scheduling problems

== Sources ==
- Rules for the FIS Cross-Country World Cup 2018/2019 (PDF). International Ski Federation (FIS). 2018.
- Rules for the FIS Cross-Country World Cup 2019/2020 (PDF). International Ski Federation (FIS). 2019.
- Rules for the FIS Cross-Country World Cup 2019/2020 (PDF). International Ski Federation (FIS). 2020.
- Rules for the FIS Cross-Country World Cup 2022/2023 (PDF). International Ski Federation. Archived from the original (PDF) on 2 December 2022.
- Rules for the FIS Cross-Country World Cup 2025/2026 (PDF). International Ski Federation (FIS).
