= Ingvild Flugstad Østberg =

Norwegian cross-country skier (born 1990)

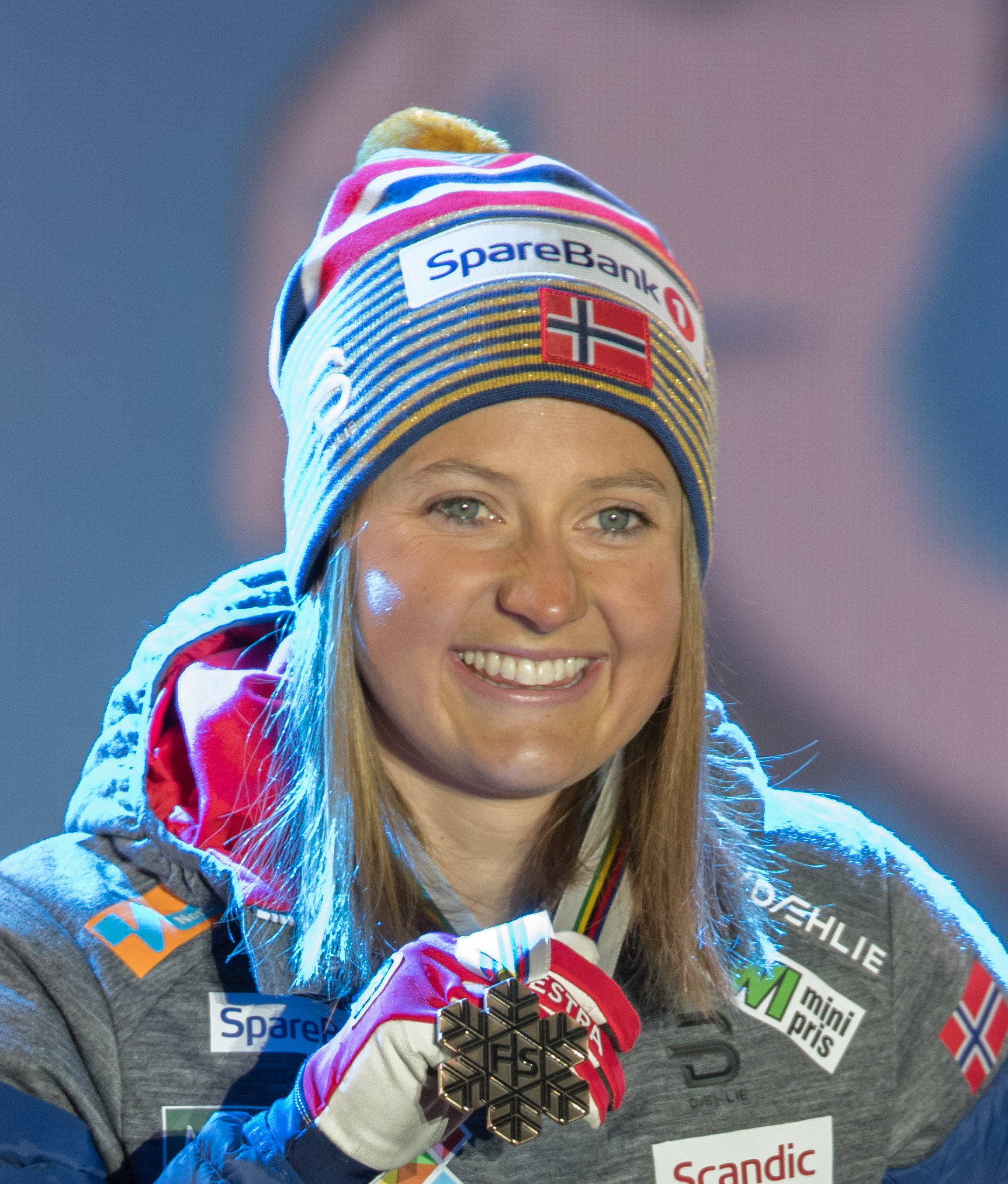
- Flugstad Østberg with her bronze medal for third place in the 10 km at the 2019 World Championships in Seefeld

Personal information
- Nationality: Norway
- Born: 9 November 1990 (age 35) Gjøvik, Norway
- Height: 1.65 m (5 ft 5 in)

Sport
- Sport: Skiing
- Club: Gjøvik Skiklubb

World Cup career
- Seasons: 15 – (2008–2020, 2022–present)
- Indiv. starts: 275
- Indiv. podiums: 73
- Indiv. wins: 17
- Team starts: 22
- Team podiums: 15
- Team wins: 10
- Overall titles: 1 – (2019)
- Discipline titles: 0
Medal record
Women's cross-country skiing
Representing Norway
International nordic ski competitions
Event	1st	2nd	3rd
Olympic Games	2	1	0
World Championships	2	3	2
Total	4	4	2
Olympic Games
Gold medal – first place	2014 Sochi	Team sprint
Gold medal – first place	2018 Pyeongchang	4 × 5 km relay
Silver medal – second place	2014 Sochi	Individual sprint
World Championships
Gold medal – first place	2015 Falun	Team sprint
Gold medal – first place	2023 Planica	4 × 5 km relay
Silver medal – second place	2019 Seefeld	15 km skiathlon
Silver medal – second place	2019 Seefeld	30 km freestyle
Silver medal – second place	2019 Seefeld	4 × 5 km relay
Bronze medal – third place	2019 Seefeld	10 km classical
Bronze medal – third place	2019 Seefeld	Team sprint
U23 World Championships
Gold medal – first place	2011 Otepää	15 km skiathlon
Junior World Championships
Gold medal – first place	2008 Mals	4 × 3.33 km relay
Gold medal – first place	2009 Praz de Lys-Sommand	Individual sprint
Gold medal – first place	2009 Praz de Lys-Sommand	10 km skiathlon
Gold medal – first place	2009 Praz de Lys-Sommand	5 km freestyle
Gold medal – first place	2009 Praz de Lys-Sommand	4 × 3.33 km relay
Gold medal – first place	2010 Hinterzarten	10 km skiathlon
Gold medal – first place	2010 Hinterzarten	4 × 3.33 km relay
Silver medal – second place	2008 Mals	5 km classical
Silver medal – second place	2010 Hinterzarten	Individual sprint
Silver medal – second place	2010 Hinterzarten	5 km classical
- Updated on 27 March 2023

Ingvild Flugstad Østberg (born 9 November 1990) is a Norwegian cross-country skier who has competed since 2008.

== Career ==
She won her first competition in the sprint event in the Tour de Ski on 31 December 2013. Her previous best individual World Cup finish was a second place at a sprint event on 1 January 2013 held in Val Müstair, Switzerland during Tour de Ski.

She won four gold medals during the 2009 Junior World Championship in Praz de Lys-Sommand, but had to settle for a fifth place in the team sprint event during the 2009 World Championship in Liberec, along with Astrid Jacobsen. She finished 37th in the 30 km event.

At the 2014 Olympic Games in Sochi, she won the team sprint with Marit Bjørgen, and placed second in the individual sprint. In Falun, she won the team sprint, this time with Maiken Caspersen Falla.

In the 2015–2016 season, she placed second in the Tour de Ski. In the 2018–2019 season, Østberg won the Tour de Ski with a record winning margin of 2 min 42.0 seconds down to Russian Natalya Nepryayeva.

She has previously played football for Gjøvik FK.

In November 2019, she was handed a competition ban by the Norwegian Ski Federation (NSF), for not fulfilling the NSF's health criteria. She was forced to sit out seven World Cup races, before making her return in late December, where she finished third overall in the 2019–20 Tour de Ski.

In March 2020, she suffered a stress fracture in her left heel, and missed the last two World Cup races of the season.

In November 2020 she was handed another competition ban from the NSF, for failing to fulfill the NSF's health criteria, with regards to nutritional intake.

As a consequence of the ban, she was forced to sit out the whole 2020–21 World Cup season, and missed the 2021 World Championships in Oberstdorf, Germany.

In November 2021, the competition ban was lifted. She made her comeback in the World Cup opener in Rukatunturi, Finland, where she finished 33rd in the 10 km classical race. She competed in an additional two races, with her best result being eight in Davos, Switzerland.

On 26 December 2021, she was handed a third competition ban by the NSF. The NSF head physician, Øystein Andersen, said in a press briefing that the medical results from the three World Cup races Østberg had taken part in, showed that she couldn't handle a tougher schedule. The ban stretched over the 2021–22 Tour de Ski and the 2022 Winter Olympics.

On 7 November 2022, she was cleared to compete again, having passed the NSF's health criteria. She took part in the opening races of the 2022–23 World Cup in Rukatunturi, Finland. She finished 16th in the 10 km classical and 11th in the 20 km freestyle pursuit.

== Cross-country skiing results ==
All results are sourced from the International Ski Federation (FIS).

=== Olympic Games ===
- 3 medals – (2 gold, 1 silver)

Year	Age	10 km individual	15 km skiathlon	30 km mass start	Sprint	4 × 5 km relay	Team sprint
2014	23	—	—	—	Silver	—	Gold
2018	27	7	11	4	17	Gold	—

=== World Championships ===
- 7 medals (2 gold, 3 silver, 2 bronze)

Year	Age	10 km individual	15 km skiathlon	30 km mass start	Sprint	4 × 5 km relay	Team sprint
2009	18	—	—	36	—	—	5
2013	22	—	—	—	17	—	4
2015	24	—	—	10	6	—	Gold
2017	26	8	19	—	22	—	—
2019	28	Bronze	Silver	Silver	—	Silver	Bronze
2023	32	5	7	11	—	Gold	—

=== World Cup ===
==== Season titles ====
- 1 title – (1 overall)

Season
Season	Discipline
2019	Overall

==== Season standings ====
Season	Age	Discipline standings			Ski Tour standings				
Season	Age	Overall	Distance	Sprint	Nordic Opening	Tour de Ski	Ski Tour 2020	World Cup Final	Ski Tour Canada
2008	17	NC	—	NC	—N/a	—	—N/a	—	—N/a
2009	18	60	41	49	—N/a	—	—N/a	36	—N/a
2010	19	64	50	60	—N/a	—	—N/a	29	—N/a
2011	20	28	25	22	22	14	—N/a	28	—N/a
2012	21	19	20	8	20	15	—N/a	36	—N/a
2013	22	15	28	3rd place, bronze medalist(s)	DNF	DNF	—N/a	13	—N/a
2014	23	10	19	4	13	DNF	—N/a	6	—N/a
2015	24	4	15	2nd place, silver medalist(s)	4	DNF	—N/a	—N/a	—N/a
2016	25	2nd place, silver medalist(s)	3rd place, bronze medalist(s)	2nd place, silver medalist(s)	3rd place, bronze medalist(s)	2nd place, silver medalist(s)	—N/a	—N/a	3rd place, bronze medalist(s)
2017	26	3rd place, bronze medalist(s)	4	5	2nd place, silver medalist(s)	4	—N/a	6	—N/a
2018	27	3rd place, bronze medalist(s)	2nd place, silver medalist(s)	13	5	2nd place, silver medalist(s)	—N/a	8	—N/a
2019	28	1st place, gold medalist(s)	2nd place, silver medalist(s)	15	3rd place, bronze medalist(s)	1st place, gold medalist(s)	—N/a	3rd place, bronze medalist(s)	—N/a
2020	29	5	5	39	—	3rd place, bronze medalist(s)	3rd place, bronze medalist(s)	—N/a	—N/a
2022	31	65	37	—	—N/a	—	—N/a	—N/a	—N/a
2023	32	26	12	—	—N/a	—	—N/a	—N/a	—N/a

==== Individual podiums ====
- 17 victories – (5 WC, 12 SWC)
- 73 podiums – (38 WC, 35 SWC)

No.	Season	Date	Location	Race	Level	Place
1	2012–13	1 January 2013	Val Müstair, Switzerland	1.4 km Sprint F	Stage World Cup	2nd
2	2012–13	13 March 2013	Drammen, Norway	1.3 km Sprint C	World Cup	3rd
3	2013–14	29 December 2013	Oberhof, Germany	1.5 km Sprint F	Stage World Cup	3rd
4	2013–14	31 December 2013	Lenzerheide, Switzerland	1.5 km Sprint F	Stage World Cup	1st
5	2013–14	11 January 2014	Nové Město, Czech Republic	1.3 km Sprint F	World Cup	3rd
6	2013–14	2 February 2014	Toblach, Italy	1.3 km Sprint F	World Cup	3rd
7	2013–14	14 March 2014	Falun, Sweden	1.2 km Sprint C	Stage World Cup	2nd
8	2014–15	14 December 2014	Davos, Switzerland	1.3 km Sprint F	World Cup	1st
9	2014–15	21 December 2014	Davos, Switzerland	1.3 km Sprint F	World Cup	3rd
10	2014–15	6 January 2015	Val Müstair, Switzerland	1.4 km Sprint F	Stage World Cup	3rd
11	2014–15	17 January 2015	Otepää, Estonia	1.2 km Sprint C	World Cup	1st
12	2014–15	7 March 2015	Lahti, Finland	1.5 km Sprint F	World Cup	2nd
13	2015–16	27–29 November 2015	(Finland) Nordic Opening	Overall Standings	World Cup	3rd
14	2015–16	12 December 2015	Davos, Switzerland	15 km Individual F	World Cup	2nd
15	2015–16	13 December 2015	Davos, Switzerland	1.6 km Sprint F	World Cup	3rd
16	2015–16	19 December 2015	Toblach, Italy	1.3 km Sprint F	World Cup	2nd
17	2015–16	20 December 2015	Toblach, Italy	10 km Individual C	World Cup	3rd
18	2015–16	1 January 2016	Lenzerheide, Switzerland	1.5 km Sprint F	Stage World Cup	3rd
19	2015–16	2 January 2016	Lenzerheide, Switzerland	15 km Mass Start C	Stage World Cup	2nd
20	2015–16	3 January 2016	Lenzerheide, Switzerland	5 km Pursuit F	Stage World Cup	1st
21	2015–16	5 January 2016	Oberstdorf, Germany	1.2 km Sprint C	Stage World Cup	3rd
22	2015–16	6 January 2016	Oberstdorf, Germany	10 km Mass Start C	Stage World Cup	2nd
23	2015–16	8 January 2016	Toblach, Italy	5 km Individual F	Stage World Cup	3rd
24	2015–16	9 January 2016	Val di Fiemme, Italy	10 km Mass Start C	Stage World Cup	2nd
25	2015–16	1–10 January 2016	(Switzerland) (Germany) (Italy) Tour de Ski	Overall Standings	World Cup	2nd
26	2015–16	3 February 2016	Drammen, Norway	1.2 km Sprint C	World Cup	2nd
27	2015–16	7 February 2016	Oslo, Norway	30 km Mass Start C	World Cup	2nd
28	2015–16	11 February 2016	Stockholm, Sweden	1.2 km Sprint C	World Cup	2nd
29	2015–16	13 February 2016	Falun, Sweden	5 km Individual C	World Cup	3rd
30	2015–16	21 February 2016	Lahti, Finland	7.5 km + 7.5 km Skiathlon C/F	World Cup	3rd
31	2015–16	8 March 2016	Canmore, Canada	1.5 km Sprint C	Stage World Cup	3rd
32	2015–16	11 March 2016	Canmore, Canada	10 km Individual F	Stage World Cup	1st
33	2015–16	1–12 March 2016	Ski Tour Canada	Overall Standings	World Cup	3rd
34	2016–17	4 December 2016	Lillehammer, Norway	10 km Pursuit C	Stage World Cup	2nd
35	2016–17	2–4 December 2016	(Norway) Nordic Opening	Overall Standings	World Cup	2nd
36	2016–17	10 December 2016	Davos, Switzerland	15 km Individual F	World Cup	1st
37	2016–17	11 December 2016	Davos, Switzerland	1.6 km Sprint F	World Cup	2nd
38	2016–17	17 December 2016	La Clusaz, France	10 km Mass Start F	World Cup	3rd
39	2016–17	1 January 2017	Val Müstair, Switzerland	5 km Mass Start C	Stage World Cup	1st
40	2016–17	4 January 2017	Oberstdorf, Germany	10 km Pursuit F	Stage World Cup	3rd
41	2016–17	29 January 2017	Falun, Sweden	15 km Mass Start C	World Cup	2nd
42	2017–18	25 November 2017	Rukatunturi, Finland	10 km Individual C	Stage World Cup	3rd
43	2017–18	10 December 2017	Davos, Switzerland	10 km Individual F	World Cup	1st
44	2017–18	17 December 2017	Toblach, Italy	10 km Pursuit C	World Cup	2nd
45	2017–18	31 December 2017	Lenzerheide, Switzerland	10 km Individual C	Stage World Cup	1st
46	2017–18	1 January 2018	Lenzerheide, Switzerland	10 km Pursuit F	Stage World Cup	1st
47	2017–18	4 January 2018	Oberstdorf, Germany	10 km Mass Start F	Stage World Cup	1st
48	2017–18	30 December 2017 – 7 January 2018	(Switzerland) (Germany) (Italy) Tour de Ski	Overall Standings	World Cup	2nd
49	2017–18	17 March 2018	Falun, Sweden	10 km Mass Start C	Stage World Cup	3rd
50	2018–19	2 December 2018	Lillehammer, Norway	10 km Pursuit C	Stage World Cup	2nd
51	2018–19	30 November – 2 December 2018	(Norway) Nordic Opening	Overall Standings	World Cup	3rd
52	2018–19	8 December 2018	Beitostølen, Norway	15 km Individual F	World Cup	3rd
53	2018–19	16 December 2018	Davos, Switzerland	10 km Individual F	World Cup	2nd
54	2018–19	30 December 2018	Toblach, Italy	10 km Individual F	Stage World Cup	2nd
55	2018–19	2 January 2019	Oberstdorf, Germany	10 km Mass Start C	Stage World Cup	1st
56	2018–19	3 January 2019	Oberstdorf, Germany	10 km Pursuit F	Stage World Cup	1st
57	2018–19	5 January 2019	Val di Fiemme, Italy	10 km Mass Start C	Stage World Cup	1st
58	2018–19	6 January 2019	Val di Fiemme, Italy	9 km Pursuit F	Stage World Cup	1st
59	2018–19	29 December 2018 – 6 January 2019	(Italy) (Switzerland) (Germany) (Italy) Tour de Ski	Overall Standings	World Cup	1st
60	2018–19	23 March 2019	Quebec City, Canada	10 km Mass Start C	Stage World Cup	3rd
61	2018–19	22–24 March 2019	(Canada) World Cup Final	Overall Standings	World Cup	3rd
62	2019–20	31 December 2019	Toblach, Italy	10 km Individual F	Stage World Cup	2nd
63	2019–20	1 January 2020	Toblach, Italy	10 km Pursuit C	Stage World Cup	1st
64	2019–20	5 January 2020	Val di Fiemme, Italy	10 km Mass Start F	Stage World Cup	3rd
65	2019–20	28 December 2019 – 5 January 2020	(Switzerland) (Italy) Tour de Ski	Overall Standings	World Cup	3rd
66	2019–20	19 January 2020	Nové Město, Czech Republic	10 km Pursuit C	World Cup	3rd
67	2019–20	25 January 2020	Oberstdorf, Germany	7.5 km + 7.5 km Skiathlon C/F	World Cup	2nd
68	2019–20	15 February 2020	Östersund, Sweden	10 km Individual F	Stage World Cup	3rd
69	2019–20	16 February 2020	Östersund, Sweden	10 km Pursuit C	Stage World Cup	3rd
70	2019–20	20 February 2020	Meråker, Norway	34 km Mass Start F	Stage World Cup	2nd
71	2019–20	15–23 February 2020	(Sweden) (Norway) FIS Ski Tour 2020	Overall Standings	World Cup	3rd
72	2022–23	18 December 2022	Davos, Switzerland	20 km Individual F	World Cup	2nd
73	2022–23	4 February 2023	Toblach, Italy	10 km Individual F	World Cup	3rd

==== Team podiums ====
- 10 victories – (8 RL, 2 TS)
- 15 podiums – (11 RL, 4 TS)

No.	Season	Date	Location	Race	Level	Place	Teammate(s)
1	2011–12	20 November 2011	Sjusjøen, Norway	4 × 5 km Relay C/F	World Cup	2nd	Jacobsen / Berger / Kristoffersen
2	2011–12	12 February 2012	Nové Město, Czech Republic	4 × 5 km Relay C/F	World Cup	3rd	Weng / Haga / Kristoffersen
3	2012–13	13 January 2013	Liberec, Czech Republic	6 × 0.85 km Team Sprint F	World Cup	1st	Falla
4	2012–13	20 January 2013	Nové Město, Czech Republic	4 × 5 km Relay C/F	World Cup	3rd	Skofterud / Hagen / Jacobsen
5	2013–14	22 December 2013	Asiago, Italy	6 × 1.25 km Team Sprint C	World Cup	2nd	Falla
6	2013–14	12 January 2014	Nové Město, Czech Republic	6 × 1.3 km Team Sprint C	World Cup	1st	Falla
7	2014–15	18 January 2015	Otepää, Estonia	6 × 1.2 km Team Sprint F	World Cup	2nd	Falla
8	2015–16	6 December 2015	Lillehammer, Norway	4 × 5 km Relay C/F	World Cup	1st	Falla / Johaug / Weng
9	2015–16	24 January 2016	Nové Město, Czech Republic	4 × 5 km Relay C/F	World Cup	1st	Weng / Johaug / Jacobsen
10	2016–17	18 December 2016	La Clusaz, France	4 × 5 km Relay C/F	World Cup	1st	Bjørgen / Haga / Weng
11	2016–17	22 January 2017	Ulricehamn, Sweden	4 × 5 km Relay C/F	World Cup	1st	Weng / Jacobsen / Bjørgen
12	2018–19	9 December 2018	Beitostølen, Norway	4 × 5 km Relay C/F	World Cup	1st	Weng / Johaug / Haga
13	2018–19	27 January 2019	Ulricehamn, Sweden	4 × 5 km Relay C/F	World Cup	1st	Weng / Johaug / Jacobsen
14	2019–20	1 March 2020	Lahti, Finland	4 × 5 km Relay C/F	World Cup	1st	T. Udnes Weng / Johaug / Weng
15	2022–23	1 March 2020	Toblach, Italy	4 × 7.5 km Relay C/F	World Cup	1st	Weng / Kalvå / Theodorsen
