= Marthe Kristoffersen =

Norwegian cross-country skier

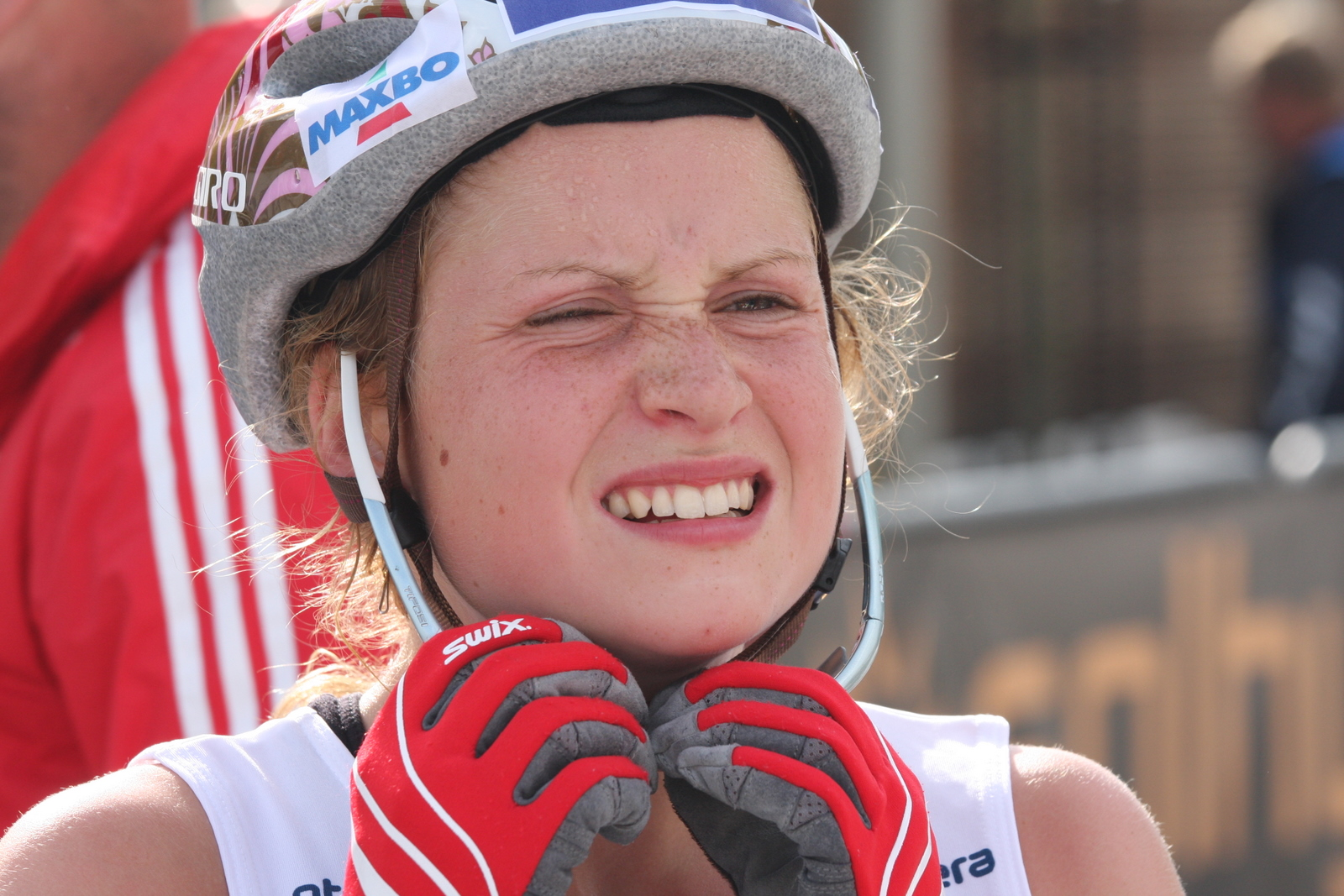
- Marthe Kristoffersen in Sandnes in 2009

Personal information
- Nationality: Norway
- Born: 11 August 1989 (age 36) Vannøya, Troms, Norway

Sport
- Sport: Skiing
- Club: IL Varden

World Cup career
- Seasons: 10 – (2008–2017)
- Indiv. starts: 123
- Indiv. podiums: 6
- Indiv. wins: 0
- Team starts: 11
- Team podiums: 4
- Team wins: 2
- Overall titles: 0 – (6th in 2012)
- Discipline titles: 0
Medal record
Women's cross-country skiing
Representing Norway
Junior World Championships
Gold medal – first place	2008 Mals	4 × 3.33 km relay
Gold medal – first place	2009 Praz de Lys-Sommand	4 × 3.33 km relay
Silver medal – second place	2007 Tarvisio	5 km freestyle

Marthe Kristoffersen (born 11 August 1989 in Karlsøy, Norway) is a Norwegian cross-country skier who has competed since 2006. At the 2010 Winter Olympics, she finished 21st in the 30 kilometres (19 mi) and 49th in the 10 kilometres (6.2 mi) event. She was born on the island of Vannøya in Karlsøy Municipality in Troms county, Norway.

At the 2009 World Championship in Liberec, she finished fourth in the 4 × 5 km relay, ninth in the individual sprint, and 12th in the 30 kilometres (19 mi) events.

She has two World Cup victories, both in 4 × 5 km relays (2008, 2009). Kristoffersen also finished third at a 10 kilometres (6.2 mi) event in Lahti on 8 March 2009.

She finished in 11th place overall in the 2009–10 Tour de Ski.

== Cross-country skiing results ==
All results are sourced from the International Ski Federation (FIS).

=== Olympic Games ===
Year	Age	10 km individual	15 km skiathlon	30 km mass start	Sprint	4 × 5 km relay	Team sprint
2010	20	48	—	20	—	—	—

=== World Championships ===
Year	Age	10 km individual	15 km skiathlon	30 km mass start	Sprint	4 × 5 km relay	Team sprint
2009	19	20	—	12	8	4	—
2011	21	—	15	—	—	—	—

=== World Cup ===
==== Season standings ====
Season	Age	Discipline standings			Ski Tour standings			
Season	Age	Overall	Distance	Sprint	Nordic Opening	Tour de Ski	World Cup Final	Ski Tour Canada
2008	18	47	29	73	—N/a	—	26	—N/a
2009	19	23	21	35	—N/a	DNF	9	—N/a
2010	20	12	17	28	—N/a	10	22	—N/a
2011	21	13	10	49	DNF	7	14	—N/a
2012	22	6	5	37	9	5	7	—N/a
2013	23	63	41	NC	—	DNF	—	—N/a
2014	24	86	55	NC	—	—	—	—N/a
2015	25	103	74	NC	DNF	—	—N/a	—N/a
2016	26	96	75	—	—	—	—N/a	—
2017	27	53	44	53	28	—	29	—N/a

==== Individual podiums ====
- 6 podiums – (2 WC, 4 SWC)

No.	Season	Date	Location	Race	Level	Place
1	2008–09	8 March 2009	Lahti, Finland	10 km Individual F	World Cup	3rd
2	2008–09	22 March 2008	Falun, Sweden	10 km Pursuit F	Stage World Cup	3rd
3	2010–11	3 January 2011	Oberstdorf, Germany	5 km + 5 km Pursuit C/F	Stage World Cup	3rd
4	2010–11	9 January 2011	Val di Fiemme, Italy	9 km Pursuit F	Stage World Cup	3rd
5	2011–12	4 February 2012	Rybinsk, Russia	10 km Mass Start F	World Cup	3rd
6	2011–12	16 March 2012	Falun, Sweden	2.5 km Individual F	Stage World Cup	3rd

==== Team podiums ====
- 2 victories
- 4 podiums

No.	Season	Date	Location	Race	Level	Place	Teammates
1	2008–09	23 November 2008	Gällivare, Sweden	4 × 5 km Relay C/F	World Cup	1st	Bjørgen / Johaug / Steira
2	2009–10	7 March 2010	Lahti, Finland	4 × 5 km Relay C/F	World Cup	1st	Johaug / Steira / Bjørgen
3	2011–12	20 November 2011	Sjusjøen, Norway	4 × 5 km Relay C/F	World Cup	2nd	Jacobsen / Østberg / Berger
4	2011–12	12 February 2012	Nové Město, Czech Republic	4 × 5 km Relay C/F	World Cup	3rd	Weng / Haga / Østberg
