= Ytre Enebakk =

Coordinates: 59°43′43″N 11°2′21″E

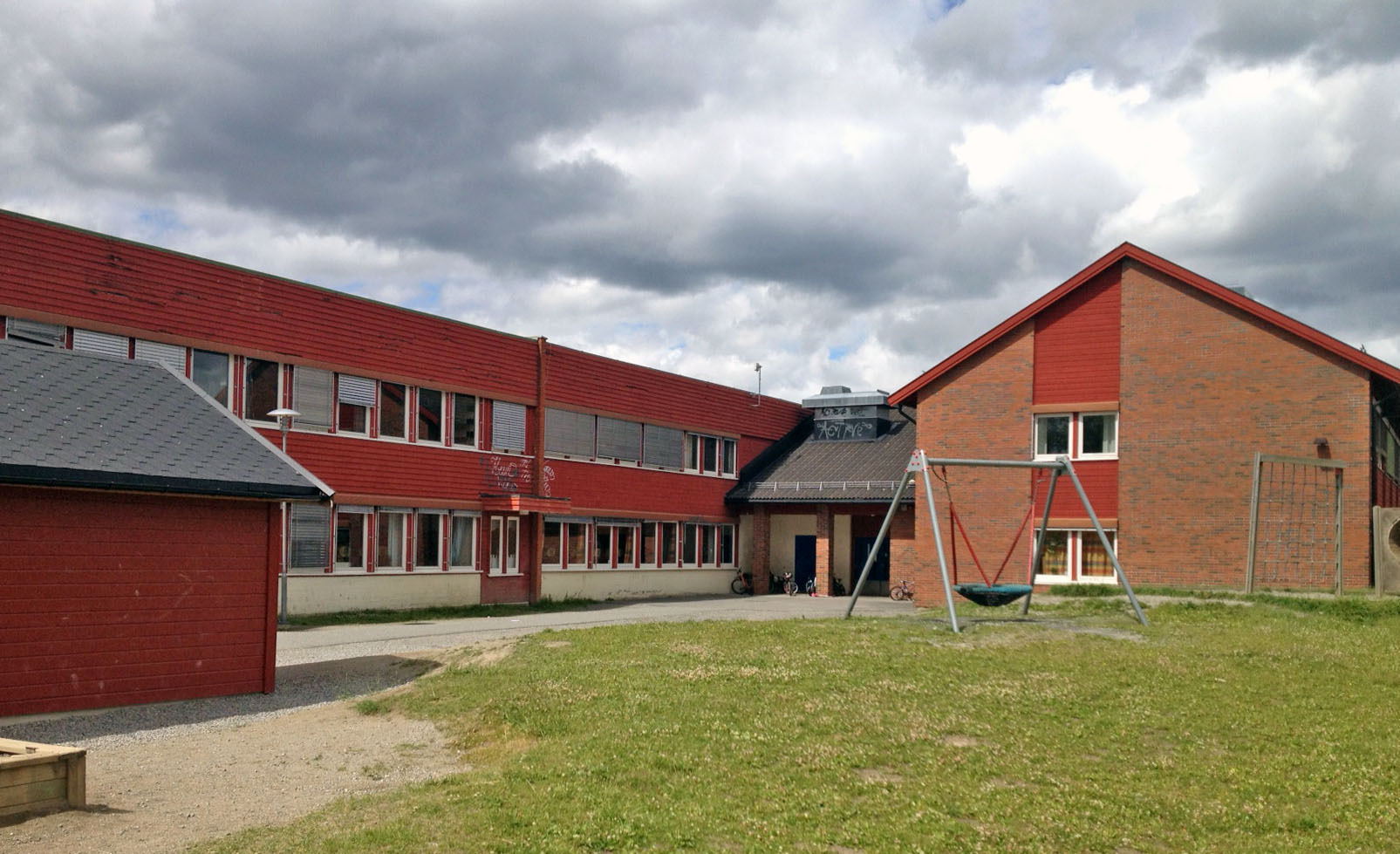
- Ytre Enebakk School

- Location in Akershus
- Country: Norway
- Region: Østlandet
- County: Akershus
- Time zone: UTC+01:00 (CET)
  - Summer (DST): UTC+02:00 (CEST)

Ytre Enebakk is a village and a forest and farming village in the municipality Enebakk in Akershus. The village has 3,359 inhabitants as of 1 January 2009, and is located 10 kilometers southwest of the municipal center of Kirkebygda and 30 kilometers from Oslo, Norway's capital. Ytre Enebakk is surrounded by low wooded hills and many small lakes

Ytre Enebakk was formerly a society based on sawmill operations and forestry. Today, most of its residents work outside the village. Ytre Enebakk have a mall with several shops, pharmacies and dentists. Residents of the Ytre Enebakk trades for less than half as much locally, compared with the rest of the country. Large portions of this leakage can be explained in the Ytre Enebakk is a commuter community. It is expected that population will increase in coming years. Ytre Enebakk has one of the youngest populations in the country.

The name "Ytre Enebakk" comes from the village's original name: "Ytterbygda" or "Ytterbygdsfjerdingen". Enebakk community originally consisted of four "fjerdinger": Ytre Enebakk (Ytterbygda), Kirkebygda, Flateby (Stranda) and Dalefjerdingen.

Total population of around 10,000 people in the community, most of them in Ytre Enebakk and Flateby. Political, administrative management of the municipality is located in Kirkebygda, located midway between Flateby and Ytre Enebakk.

Ytre Enebakk has five kindergartens and an elementary and secondary school.
