= Gjøvik FK =

Norwegian football club

- Full name: Gjøvik Fotballklubb
- Founded: 15 August 1991
- Ground: Gjøvik stadion
- League: First Division
Home colours

Gjøvik Fotballklubb was a Norwegian women's football club from Gjøvik. It founded on August 15, 1991, it played in the First Division, the second tier in Norway.

The club was a merger between the women's football sections of Vind and Raufoss. Originally named Raufoss/Vind FK, in 1996 the club changed its name to Gjøvik FK. After the 2009 season, however, the club had run out of funds and faced hardships in acquiring training space. The team subsequently relocated to Raufoss.

Their most famous player was cross-country skier Ingvild Flugstad Østberg.

== See also ==
- Gjøvik FF
