= Gjøvik FF =

Norwegian football club

- Full name: Gjøvik Fotballforening
- Founded: 8 October 2008
- Dissolved: 1 January 2014
- Ground: Gjøvik Stadion

Gjøvik Fotballforening was a Norwegian football club from Gjøvik, founded in 2008. The club was dissolved in 2014 as a result of a merger with FK Gjøvik-Lyn.

== History ==
The club was established on 8 October 2008 as a merger of the senior teams of SK Gjøvik-Lyn and Vardal IF. The clubs Vind and Redalen were asked to join, but declined. In May 2009 it faced Rosenborg in the Norwegian football cup, losing 0–4 in front of a 5,000 attendance. In 2010 it won its Third Division group, but lost out in a promotion playoff against Elverum. Gjøvik won their Third Division in 2011 and was promoted to the Second Division.

== Season history ==
Season		Pos.	Pl.	W	D	L	GS	GA	P	Cup	Notes
2009	3. divisjon	2	22	15	4	3	73	28	49	First round	
2010	3. divisjon	1	22	20	1	1	103	21	61	First round	
2011	3. divisjon	↑ 1	26	22	3	1	96	23	69	Second round	Promoted to the 2. divisjon
2012	2. divisjon	8	26	9	9	8	38	43	36	Second round	
2013	2. divisjon	9	26	9	6	11	39	48	33	First round	

== See also ==
- Gjøvik FK
