= Astrid Uhrenholdt Jacobsen =

Norwegian cross-country skier

Astrid Uhrenholdt Jacobsen OLY
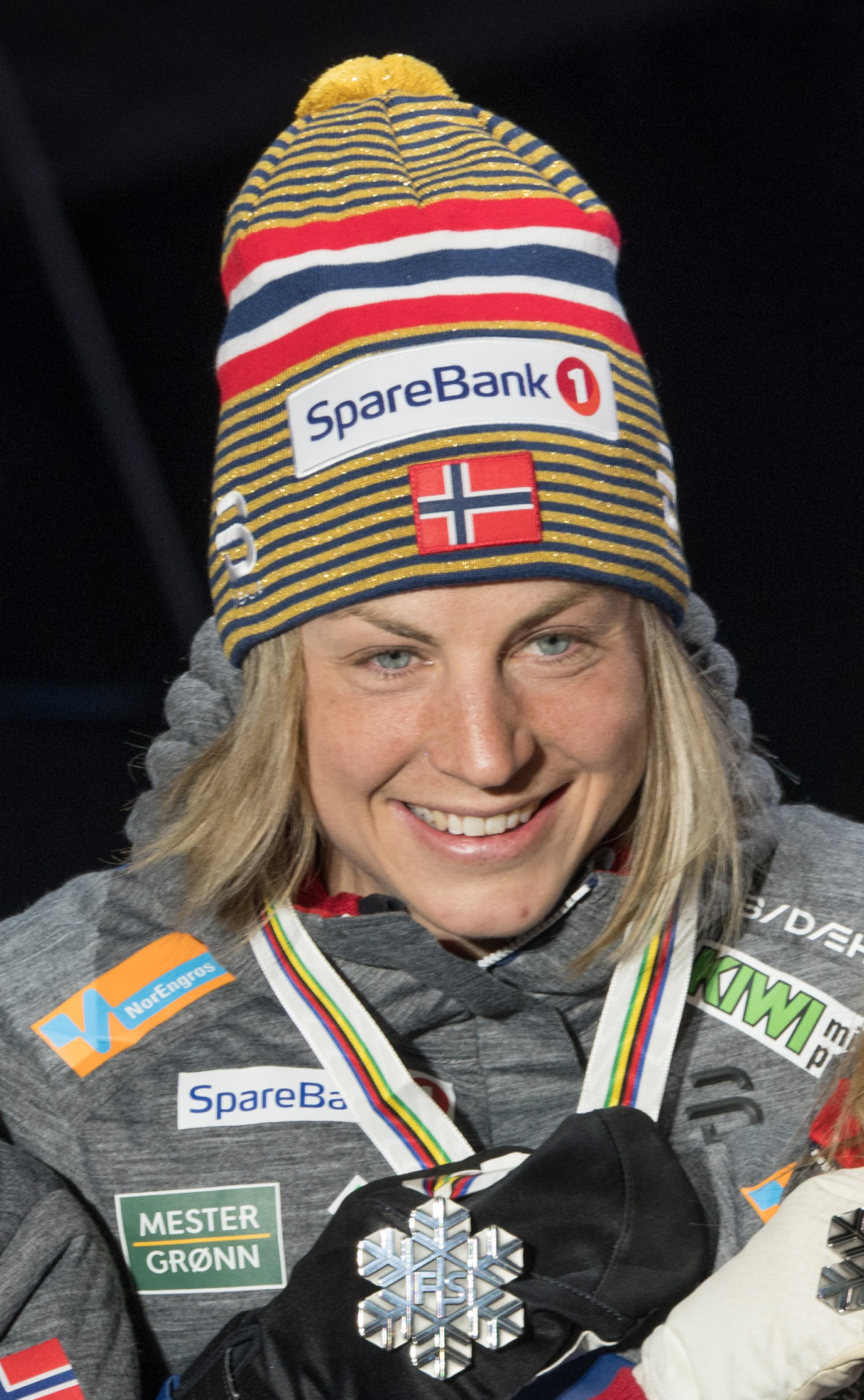
- Jacobsen during the World Championships in Seefeld in Tirol, Austria in February 2019

Personal information
- Full name: Astrid Uhrenholdt Jacobsen
- Nationality: Norway
- Born: 22 January 1987 (age 39) Trondheim, Norway
- Height: 1.75 m (5 ft 9 in)

Sport
- Sport: Skiing
- Club: IL Heming

World Cup career
- Seasons: 16 – (2005–2020)
- Indiv. starts: 258
- Indiv. podiums: 43
- Indiv. wins: 6
- Team starts: 26
- Team podiums: 13
- Team wins: 8
- Overall titles: 0 – (2nd in 2008)
- Discipline titles: 0
Medal record
Women's cross-country skiing
Representing Norway
International nordic ski competitions
Event	1st	2nd	3rd
Olympic Games	1	0	0
World Championships	3	2	5
Total	4	2	5
Olympic Games
Gold medal – first place	2018 Pyeongchang	4 × 5 km relay
World Championships
Gold medal – first place	2007 Sapporo	Individual sprint
Gold medal – first place	2015 Falun	4 × 5 km relay
Gold medal – first place	2017 Lahti	4 × 5 km relay
Silver medal – second place	2015 Falun	15 km skiathlon
Silver medal – second place	2019 Seefeld	4 × 5 km relay
Bronze medal – third place	2007 Sapporo	Team sprint
Bronze medal – third place	2007 Sapporo	4 × 5 km relay
Bronze medal – third place	2011 Oslo	Team sprint
Bronze medal – third place	2017 Lahti	10 km classical
Bronze medal – third place	2017 Lahti	30 km freestyle
Junior World Championships
Gold medal – first place	2005 Rovaniemi	4 × 5 km relay
Gold medal – first place	2006 Kranj	Individual sprint
Gold medal – first place	2006 Kranj	5 km classical
Gold medal – first place	2007 Taraviso	Individual sprint
Gold medal – first place	2007 Taraviso	4 × 3.33 km relay
Silver medal – second place	2005 Rovaniemi	5 km classical
Bronze medal – third place	2007 Taraviso	5 km freestyle

Astrid Uhrenholdt Jacobsen (born 22 January 1987) is a Norwegian former cross-country skier and a member of the International Olympic Committee (IOC). She skied with the IL Heming club in Oslo, near Holmenkollen. Her greatest achievement is winning the gold medal in sprint at the 2007 World Championships. On 22 April 2020, she announced her retirement from cross-country skiing in favour of medical studies.

== Career ==
=== Before 2006/07 season ===
Prior to the 2006/07 season Uhrenholdt Jacobsen had competed in five World Cup events, three sprint races and two pursuits. One sprint in Drammen in the 2004/05 season and the rest at the end of the 2005/06 season. Her best result in those races was a 10th place in the freestyle sprint in Changchun, China where she lost in the semi-final, having had the third best qualifying time. She also achieved another top twenty finish by finishing 17th in the classic sprint in Drammen (2005/06), after qualifying in 15th position. Jacobsen finished the 2005/06 season in 64th place overall and 35th in the sprint, gaining 40 points.

Astrid Uhrenholdt Jacobsen has competed in two Junior World Championships, in the 2004/2005 Championships held in Rovaniemi, Finland she won a silver in the sprint, behind fellow countrywoman Kari Vikhagen Gjeitnes, and ahead of Swedish Ida Ingemarsdotter. Then in the 2005/06 Championships in Kranj, Slovenia Uhrenholdt Jacobsen won two gold medals. The first in the sprint, ahead of Russian Natalia Matveeva, and Norwegian Celine Brun-Lie., after qualifying in first place. The second gold was in a 5 km classical style race, winning in a time of 13:57.9, 18.4 seconds ahead of Eva Nývltová, and 32.7 seconds ahead of Charlotte Kalla. She also competed in the pursuit two days later, but finished in 35th place, in a time of 31:26.7, 2:14.5 behind winner Kalla.

She also competed in two Scandinavian Cup races (2005/06), a pursuit and a sprint, and became fifth and eighth respectively. Uhrenholdt Jacobsen has one National Championship medal, a silver, which she won in January 2005. She became third in the qualifying, and lost to Marit Bjørgen, and ahead of Ella Gjømle, who was third.

=== 2006/07 season ===
Uhrenholdt Jacobsen competed in three of the four opening races of the 2006/07 season. In the sprint in Düsseldorf she finished in 25th position. A month later she achieved her highest ever World Cup finish, becoming fourth in the classic sprint, losing to Petra Majdič, Virpi Kuitunen, and Marit Bjørgen in the final. The day after she became 35th in the classic 10 km race, in a time of 30:29.5, 2:28.3 behind winner Kuitunen.

Her placements in the world cup were good enough to be selected for the Norwegian sprint team to the World Championships in Sapporo where she won her first international title in the sprint event. She also won bronze medals in the team sprint (with Marit Bjørgen) and the 4 x 5 km.

=== 2007/08 season ===
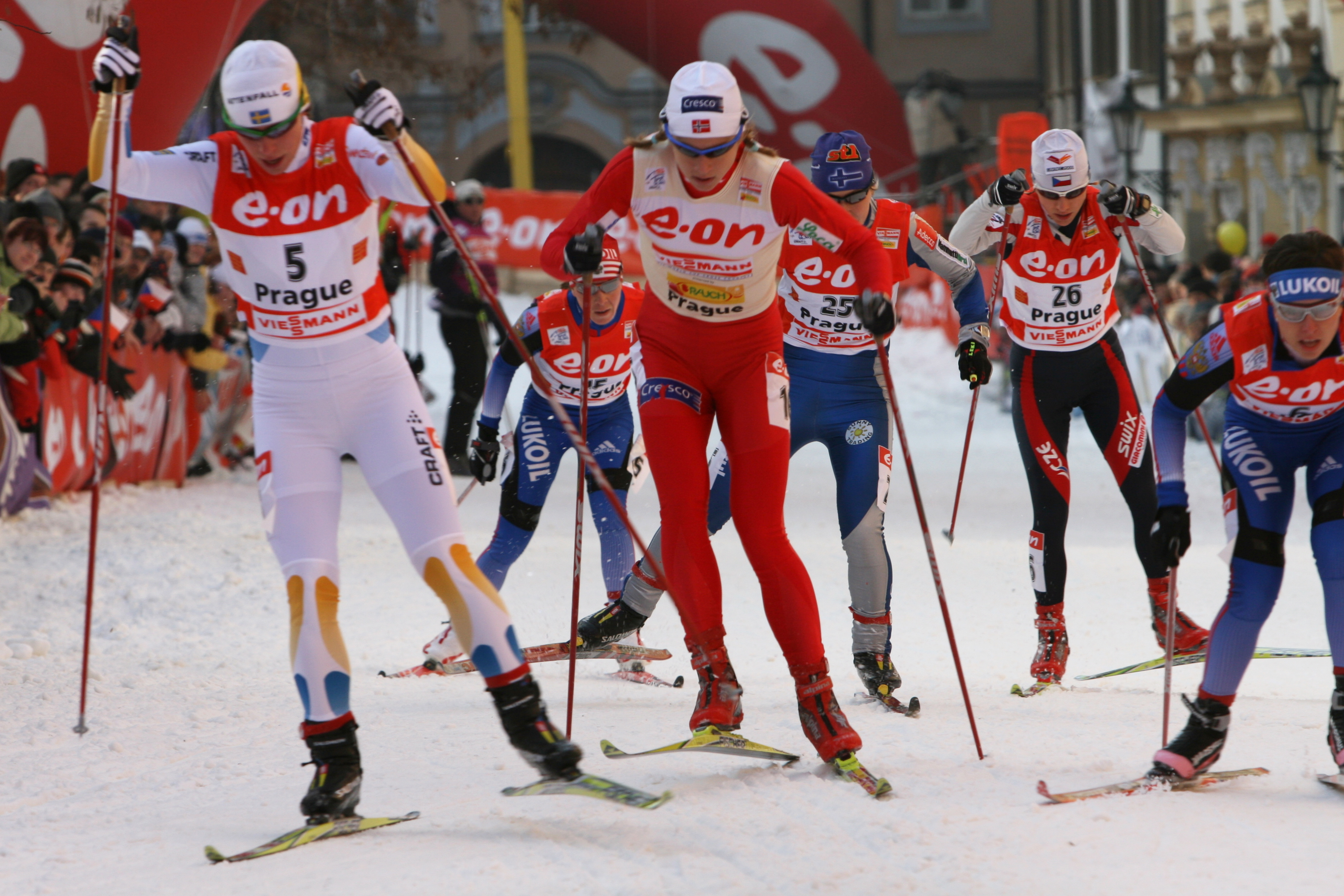
Astrid Uhrenholdt Jasobsen (numberless) at Tour de Ski in Prague in 2007

After two second places in Kuusamo, Uhrenholdt Jacobsen retrieved her first world cup in Rybinsk 15 December. by winning a 15 km freestyle. Altogether, Jacobsen had 2 wins and 6 podiums this season, placing her second overall behind Virpi Kuitunen.

=== 2008/09 season ===
After the 2007/08 season, Uhrenholdt Jacobsen was struck by injuries as well as loss of motivation. Therefore, she lost the early season. She returned to the world cup at the beginning of Tour de Ski, where she placed tenth in the opening prologue. Unfortunately, she fell ill just before the final race, causing her to give up the Tour. She was absent from the world cup after Tour de Ski as well, choosing training for the World Championship instead of competing. However, the championship ended as a big disappointment for Uhrenholdt Jacobsen, placing 20, 37, 35 in the three first individual events. Her best performance was a fifth place in team sprint along with junior Ingvild Flugstad Østberg. After these poor performances, Uhrenholdt Jacobsen chose to leave the championship. She fractured her jaw, elbow and back in a cycling accident in June 2009.

=== 2010 Winter Olympics ===
At the 2010 Winter Olympics, Uhrenholdt Jacobsen finished fifth in the team sprint and seventh in the individual sprint event.

=== 2010/11 season ===
In July 2010 Uhrenholdt Jacobsen fell and dislocated a shoulder while training on roller skis. She treated herself immediately to repair the damage and soon recovered. At the FIS Nordic World Ski Championships 2011 at Holmenkollen in Oslo, Uhrenholdt Jacobsen was selected for the Team Sprint with her teammate Maiken Caspersen Falla. The pair took Bronze behind the Swedish and Finnish teams.

=== 2013 season ===
In 2013 Uhrenholdt Jacobsen had an early success, gaining second place in the Tour de Ski on 6 January. She thanked her mother, Dr Britt Uhrenholdt Jacobsen, for suggesting during the previous summer that her daughter might be suffering from a gluten allergy, which tests then proved to be correct. Uhrenholdt Jacobsen described this diagnosis as very important for her future career.

== Cross-country skiing results ==
All results are sourced from the International Ski Federation (FIS).

=== Olympic Games ===
- 1 medal — (1 gold)

Year	Age	10 km individual	15 km skiathlon	30 km mass start	Sprint	4 × 5 km relay	Team sprint
2010	23	—	—	—	7	—	—
2014	27	17	—	—	4	5	—
2018	31	—	—	—	—	Gold	—

=== World Championships ===
- 10 medals – (3 gold, 2 silver, 5 bronze)

Year	Age	10 km individual	15 km skiathlon	30 km mass start	Sprint	4 × 5 km relay	Team sprint
2007	20	—	—	—	Gold	Bronze	Bronze
2009	22	20	36	—	34	—	5
2011	24	—	—	—	9	—	Bronze
2013	26	—	9	—	16	—	—
2015	28	33	Silver	—	—	Gold	—
2017	30	Bronze	8	Bronze	—	Gold	—
2019	32	10	4	12	—	Silver	—

=== World Cup ===
==== Season standings ====
Season	Age	Discipline standings			Ski Tour standings				
Season	Age	Overall	Distance	Sprint	Nordic Opening	Tour de Ski	Ski Tour 2020	World Cup Final	Ski Tour Canada
2005	18	90	—	66	—N/a	—N/a	—N/a	—N/a	—N/a
2006	19	64	NC	35	—N/a	—N/a	—N/a	—N/a	—N/a
2007	20	24	46	10	—N/a	—	—N/a	—N/a	—N/a
2008	21	2nd place, silver medalist(s)	4	2nd place, silver medalist(s)	—N/a	16	—N/a	7	—N/a
2009	22	90	NC	62	—N/a	DNF	—N/a	—	—N/a
2010	23	49	38	45	—N/a	DNF	—N/a	—	—N/a
2011	24	8	11	7	DNF	10	—N/a	5	—N/a
2012	25	9	11	11	32	8	—N/a	DNF	—N/a
2013	26	9	8	29	DNF	5	—N/a	6	—N/a
2014	27	3rd place, bronze medalist(s)	6	19	6	2nd place, silver medalist(s)	—N/a	DNF	—N/a
2015	28	15	10	30	DNF	—	—N/a	—N/a	—N/a
2016	29	7	8	5	7	DNF	—N/a	—N/a	6
2017	30	25	23	24	18	DNF	—N/a	—	—N/a
2018	31	15	11	45	—	DNF	—N/a	5	—N/a
2019	32	13	10	16	—	DNF	—N/a	7	—N/a
2020	33	4	6	8	3rd place, bronze medalist(s)	5	5	—N/a	—N/a

==== Individual podiums ====
- 6 victories – (4 WC, 2 SWC)
- 43 podiums – (22 WC, 21 SWC)

No.	Season	Date	Location	Race	Level	Place
1	2006–07	28 January 2007	Otepää, Estonia	1.0 km Sprint C	World Cup	2nd
2	2007–08	1 December 2007	Rukatunturi, Finland	1.2 km Sprint C	World Cup	2nd
3	2007–08	2 December 2007	Rukatunturi, Finland	10 km Individual C	World Cup	2nd
4	2007–08	15 December 2007	Rybinsk, Russia	15 km Mass Start F	World Cup	1st
5	2007–08	16 December 2007	Rybinsk, Russia	1.2 km Sprint F	World Cup	2nd
6	2007–08	23 January 2008	Canmore, Canada	1.2 km Sprint C	World Cup	2nd
7	2007–08	10 February 2008	Otepää, Estonia	1.2 km Sprint C	World Cup	2nd
8	2007–08	16 February 2008	Liberec, Czech Republic	7.6 km Individual F	World Cup	1st
9	2007–08	23 February 2008	Falun, Sweden	7.5 km + 7.5 km Pursuit C/F	World Cup	1st
10	2007–08	5 March 2008	Drammen, Norway	1.0 km Sprint C	World Cup	3rd
11	2007–08	14 March 2008	Bormio, Italy	2.5 km Individual F	World Cup	2nd
12	2010–11	26 November 2010	Rukatunturi, Finland	1.2 km Sprint C	Stage World Cup	3rd
13	2010–11	31 December 2010	Oberhof, Germany	2.5 km Individual F	Stage World Cup	3rd
14	2010–11	2 January 2011	Oberstdorf, Germany	1.2 km Sprint C	Stage World Cup	3rd
15	2010–11	13 March 2011	Lahti, Finland	1.4 km Sprint C	World Cup	2nd
16	2010–11	20 March 2011	Falun, Sweden	10 km Pursuit F	Stage World Cup	2nd
17	2011–12	31 January 2011	Oberstdorf, Germany	1.2 km Sprint C	Stage World Cup	3rd
18	2011–12	3 January 2012	Toblach, Italy	3 km Individual C	Stage World Cup	3rd
19	2011–12	7 March 2012	Drammen, Norway	1.2 km Sprint C	World Cup	2nd
20	2012–13	4 January 2013	Toblach, Italy	3 km Individual C	Stage World Cup	3rd
21	2013–14	28 December 2013	Oberhof, Germany	3 km Individual F	Stage World Cup	2nd
22	2013–14	31 December 2013	Lenzerheide, Switzerland	1.5 km Sprint F	Stage World Cup	2nd
23	2013–14	1 January 2014	Lenzerheide, Switzerland	10 km Mass Start C	Stage World Cup	2nd
24	2013–14	3 January 2014	Cortina/Toblach, Italy	15 km Pursuit F	Stage World Cup	1st
25	2013–14	4 January 2014	Val di Fiemme, Italy	5 km Individual C	Stage World Cup	2nd
26	2013–14	5 January 2014	Val di Fiemme, Italy	9 km Pursuit F	Stage World Cup	2nd
27	2013–14	28 December 2013 – 5 January 2014	(Germany) (Switzerland) (Italy) Tour de Ski	Overall Standings	World Cup	2nd
28	2014–15	23 January 2015	Rybinsk, Russia	10 km Individual F	World Cup	1st
29	2014–15	15 March 2015	Oslo, Norway	30 km Mass Start F	World Cup	3rd
30	2015–16	16 January 2016	Planica, Slovenia	1.2 km Sprint F	World Cup	2nd
31	2015–16	23 January 2016	Nové Město, Czech Republic	10 km Individual F	World Cup	2nd
32	2015–16	14 February 2016	Falun, Sweden	10 km Mass Start F	World Cup	3rd
33	2015–16	2 March 2016	Montreal, Canada	10.5 km Mass Start C	Stage World Cup	3rd
34	2015–16	5 March 2016	Quebec City, Canada	10 km Pursuit F	Stage World Cup	3rd
35	2015–16	8 March 2016	Canmore, Canada	1.5 km Sprint C	Stage World Cup	2nd
36	2015–16	9 March 2016	Canmore, Canada	7.5 km + 7.5 km Skiathlon C/F	Stage World Cup	3rd
37	2018–19	26 January 2019	Ulricehamn, Sweden	10 km Individual F	World Cup	2nd
38	2018–19	12 March 2019	Drammen, Norway	1.2 km Sprint C	World Cup	2nd
39	2019–20	29 November – 1 December 2019	(Finland) Nordic Opening	Overall Standings	World Cup	3rd
40	2019–20	3 January 2020	Val di Fiemme, Italy	10 km Mass Start C	Stage World Cup	1st
41	2019–20	4 January 2020	Val di Fiemme, Italy	1.3 km Sprint C	Stage World Cup	2nd
42	2019–20	18 February 2020	Åre, Sweden	0.7 km Sprint F	Stage World Cup	3rd
43	2019–20	23 February 2020	Trondheim, Norway	15 km Pursuit C	Stage World Cup	2nd

==== Team podiums ====
- 8 victories – (7 RL, 1 TS)
- 13 podiums – (10 RL, 3 TS)

No.	Season	Date	Location	Race	Level	Place	Teammate(s)
1	2006–07	4 February 2007	Davos, Switzerland	4 × 5 km Relay C/F	World Cup	2nd	Skofterud / Størmer Steira / Bjørgen
2	2007–08	25 November 2007	Beitostølen, Norway	4 × 5 km Relay C/F	World Cup	1st	Johaug / Skofterud / Bjørgen
3	2007–08	17 February 2008	Liberec, Czech Republic	4 × 1.4 km Team Sprint C	World Cup	1st	Bjørgen
4	2007–08	24 February 2008	Falun, Sweden	4 × 5 km Relay C/F	World Cup	1st	Aunet Tyldum / Størmer Steira / Bjørgen
5	2011–12	20 November 2011	Sjusjøen, Norway	4 × 5 km Relay C/F	World Cup	2nd	Flugstad Østberg / Berger / Kristoffersen
6	2011–12	12 February 2012	Nové Město, Czech Republic	4 × 5 km Relay C/F	World Cup	1st	Skofterud / Johaug / Bjørgen
7	2012–13	20 January 2013	La Clusaz, France	4 × 5 km Relay C/F	World Cup	2nd	Skofterud / Flugstad Østberg / Ek Hagen
8	2015–16	17 January 2016	Planica, Slovenia	6 × 1.2 km Team Sprint F	World Cup	2nd	Weng
9	2015–16	24 January 2016	Nové Město, Czech Republic	4 × 5 km Relay C/F	World Cup	1st	Flugstad Østberg / Weng / Johaug
10	2016–17	15 January 2017	Toblach, Italy	6 × 1.4 km Team Sprint F	World Cup	3rd	Caspersen Falla
11	2016–17	22 January 2017	Ulricehamn, Sweden	4 × 5 km Relay C/F	World Cup	1st	Flugstad Østberg / Weng / Bjørgen
12	2018–19	27 January 2019	Ulricehamn, Sweden	4 × 5 km Relay C/F	World Cup	1st	Weng / Johaug / Flugstad Østberg
13	2019–20	8 December 2019	Lillehammer, Norway	4 × 5 km Relay C/F	World Cup	1st	Caspersen Falla / Johaug / Weng
