= FIS Nordic World Ski Championships 2011 – Women's sprint =

Women's sprint at the FIS Nordic World Ski Championships 2011
- Venue: Holmenkollen National Arena
- Date: 24 February 2011
- Competitors: 87
- Winning time: 3:03.9

Medalists
gold medal	Marit Bjørgen	Norway
silver medal	Arianna Follis	Italy
bronze medal	Petra Majdič	Slovenia

The Women's sprint at the FIS Nordic World Ski Championships 2011 was held on 24 February 2011. Sprint qualifying at 13:00 CET with finals at 15:00 CET. The defending world champion was Italy's Arianna Follis while the defending Olympic champion was Norway's Marit Bjørgen.

== Results ==
=== Qualification ===
Rank	Bib	Athlete	Country	Time	Deficit	Note
1	30	Marit Bjørgen	Norway	3:03.89		Q
2	36	Charlotte Kalla	Sweden	3:05.39	+1.50	Q
3	19	Maiken Caspersen Falla	Norway	3:05.64	+1.75	Q
4	34	Astrid Uhrenholdt Jacobsen	Norway	3:07.31	+3.42	Q
5	29	Katja Višnar	Slovenia	3:07.64	+3.75	Q
6	32	Krista Lähteenmäki	Finland	3:07.90	+4.01	Q
7	18	Hanna Falk	Sweden	3:07.97	+4.08	Q
8	37	Laure Barthélémy	France	3:08.53	+4.64	Q
9	25	Kikkan Randall	United States	3:09.75	+5.86	Q
10	27	Magda Genuin	Italy	3:09.91	+6.02	Q
11	16	Arianna Follis	Italy	3:10.41	+6.52	Q
12	24	Celine Brun-Lie	Norway	3:10.45	+6.56	Q
13	35	Justyna Kowalczyk	Poland	3:10.49	+6.60	Q
14	23	Petra Majdič	Slovenia	3:11.13	+7.24	Q
14	20	Vesna Fabjan	Slovenia	3:11.13	+7.24	Q
16	43	Nicole Fessel	Germany	3:11.37	+7.48	Q
17	55	Silvana Bucher	Switzerland	3:12.24	+8.35	Q
18	50	Natalya Ilyina	Russia	3:12.27	+8.38	Q
19	48	Alenka Čebašek	Slovenia	3:12.88	+8.99	Q
20	39	Denise Herrmann	Germany	3:13.32	+9.43	Q
21	40	Riikka Sarasoja	Finland	3:13.49	+9.60	Q
22	17	Ida Ingemarsdotter	Sweden	3:13.50	+9.61	Q
23	44	Chandra Crawford	Canada	3:13.90	+10.01	Q
24	9	Perianne Jones	Canada	3:13.95	+10.06	Q
25	22	Alena Procházková	Slovakia	3:14.64	+10.75	Q
26	21	Anastasia Dotsenko	Russia	3:15.03	+11.14	Q
27	33	Daria Gaiazova	Canada	3:15.10	+11.21	Q
28	15	Sadie Bjornsen	United States	3:15.19	+11.30	Q
29	7	Jessie Diggins	United States	3:15.24	+11.35	Q
30	31	Hanna Brodin	Sweden	3:15.54	+11.65	Q
31	47	Aurore Jéan	France	3:15.61	+11.72	
32	38	Natalya Korostelyova	Russia	3:15.83	+11.94	
33	45	Anne Kyllönen	Finland	3:16.45	+12.56	
34	49	Triin Ojaste	Estonia	3:16.70	+12.81	
35	10	Gaia Vuerich	Italy	3:16.89	+13.00	
36	41	Kateřina Smutná	Austria	3:17.19	+13.30	
37	26	Madoka Natsumi	Japan	3:17.89	+14.00	
38	28	Pirjo Muranen	Finland	3:18.21	+14.32	
39	54	Yelena Soboleva	Russia	3:19.55	+15.66	
40	11	Yelena Kolomina	Kazakhstan	3:20.17	+16.28	
41	8	Oxana Yatskaya	Kazakhstan	3:20.31	+16.42	
42	51	Lucia Anger	Germany	3:20.55	+16.66	
43	46	Laurien van der Graaff	Switzerland	3:20.66	+16.77	
44	6	Esther Bottomley	Australia	3:21.86	+17.97	
45	53	Ida Sargent	United States	3:22.32	+18.43	
46	12	Elisa Brocard	Italy	3:22.52	+18.63	
47	2	Ewelina Marcisz	Poland	3:22.54	+18.65	
48	57	Tatyana Roshchina	Kazakhstan	3:22.85	+18.96	
49	3	Agnieszka Szymańczak	Poland	3:23.48	+19.59	
50	14	Émilie Vina	France	3:23.97	+20.08	
51	56	Kateryna Grygorenko	Ukraine	3:24.63	+20.74	
52	60	Paulina Maciuszek	Poland	3:25.30	+21.41	
53	59	Rosamund Musgrave	United Kingdom	3:26.34	+22.45	
54	1	Anastasia Slonova	Kazakhstan	3:26.51	+22.62	
55	52	Eva Nývltová	Czech Republic	3:27.05	+23.16	
56	4	Piret Pormeister	Estonia	3:27.34	+23.45	
57	64	Maryna Antsybor	Ukraine	3:28.17	+24.28	
58	58	Teodora Malcheva	Bulgaria	3:28.79	+24.90	
59	42	Hanna Kolb	Germany	3:28.81	+24.92	
60	66	Vita Yakymchuk	Ukraine	3:29.67	+25.78	
61	62	Lina Kreivenaitė	Lithuania	3:32.01	+28.12	
62	63	Mónika György	Romania	3:32.20	+28.31	
63	71	Niviaq Chemnitz Berthelsen	Denmark	3:32.56	+28.67	
64	68	Ingrida Ardišauskaitė	Lithuania	3:33.54	+29.65	
65	13	Kaija Udras	Estonia	3:33.88	+29.99	
66	5	Katarína Garajová	Slovakia	3:37.08	+30.19	
67	67	Zoya Zaviedieieva	Ukraine	3:38.21	+31.32	
68	65	Nina Broznić	Croatia	3:38.36	+31.47	
69	69	Lee Chae-won	South Korea	3:38.59	+31.70	
70	74	Inga Dauškāne	Latvia	3:39.28	+32.39	
71	70	Vedrana Malec	Croatia	3:41.54	+34.65	
72	84	Jaqueline Mourão	Brazil	3:49.07	+45.18	
73	72	Sarah Young	United Kingdom	3:50.77	+46.88	
74	86	Irina Khodiakova	Kyrgyzstan	3:52.24	+48.35	
75	79	Vera Viczián	Hungary	3:54.40	+50.51	
76	82	Rosana Kiroska	Macedonia	3:55.96	+52.07	
77	75	Kristine Liepiņa	Latvia	3:57.70	+53.81	
78	77	Ágnes Simon	Hungary	4:04.44	+1:00.55	
79	81	Natālija Kovaļova	Latvia	4:08.67	+1:04.78	
80	87	Ildikó Papp	Hungary	4:11.74	+1:07.85	
81	83	Viktória Zámbó	Hungary	4:21.85	+1:17.86	
82	73	Syuzanna Varosyan	Armenia	4:25.77	+1:21.88	
83	85	Ana Angelova	Macedonia	4:30.67	+1:26.78	
84	76	Valya Varosyan	Armenia	4:30.74	+1:26.85	
85	80	Zane Eglīte	Latvia	4:37.37	+1:33.48	
86	78	Olga Reshetkova	Kyrgyzstan	4:43.84	+1:39.95	
	61	Brooke Gosling	Canada	DNS		

=== Quarterfinals ===
Quarterfinal 1

Rank	Seed	Athlete	Country	Time	Deficit	Note
1	1	Marit Bjørgen	Norway	3:04.8		Q
2	11	Arianna Follis	Italy	3:04.9	+0.1	Q
3	30	Hanna Brodin	Sweden	3:06.1	+1.3	LL
4	10	Magda Genuin	Italy	3:06.8	+2.0	
5	20	Denise Herrmann	Germany	3:08.3	+3.5	
6	21	Riikka Sarasoja	Finland	3:09.5	+4.7	

Quarterfinal 2

Rank	Seed	Athlete	Country	Time	Deficit	Note
1	7	Hanna Falk	Sweden	3:06.0		Q
2	14	Petra Majdič	Slovenia	3:06.0		Q
3	4	Astrid Uhrenholdt Jacobsen	Norway	3:06.1	+0.1	LL
4	27	Daria Gaiazova	Canada	3:06.4	+0.4	
5	17	Silvana Bucher	Switzerland	3:08.0	+2.0	
6	24	Perianne Jones	Canada	3:08.1	+2.1	

Quarterfinal 3

Rank	Seed	Athlete	Country	Time	Deficit	Note
1	15	Vesna Fabjan	Slovenia	3:06.2		Q
2	25	Alena Procházková	Slovakia	3:06.5	+0.3	Q
3	16	Nicole Fessel	Germany	3:06.5	+0.3	
4	6	Krista Lähteenmäki	Finland	3:06.6	+0.4	
5	5	Katja Višnar	Slovenia	3:08.9	+2.7	
6	26	Anastasia Dotsenko	Russia	3:11.8	+4.6	

Quarterfinal 4

Rank	Seed	Athlete	Country	Time	Deficit	Note
1	2	Charlotte Kalla	Sweden	3:06.6		Q
2	22	Ida Ingemarsdotter	Sweden	3:07.3	+0.7	Q
3	12	Celine Brun-Lie	Norway	3:08.4	+1.8	
4	19	Alenka Čebašek	Slovenia	3:08.5	+1.9	
5	29	Jessie Diggins	United States	3:10.5	+3.9	
6	9	Kikkan Randall	United States	3:19.0	+12.4	

Quarterfinal 5

Rank	Seed	Athlete	Country	Time	Deficit	Note
1	8	Laure Barthélémy	France	3:06.8		Q
2	13	Justyna Kowalczyk	Poland	3:07.1	+0.3	Q
3	3	Maiken Caspersen Falla	Norway	3:07.3	+0.5	
4	18	Natalja Iljina	Russia	3:08.0	+1.2	
5	28	Sadie Bjornsen	United States	3:11.1	+4.3	
6	23	Chandra Crawford	Canada	3:17.8	+11.0	

=== Semifinals ===
Semifinal 1

Rank	Seed	Athlete	Country	Time	Deficit	Note
1	1	Marit Bjørgen	Norway	3:04.3		Q
2	14	Petra Majdič	Slovenia	3:04.4	+0.1	Q
3	11	Arianna Follis	Italy	3:04.6	+0.3	LL
4	25	Alena Procházková	Slovakia	3:05.8	+1.5	LL
5	4	Astrid Uhrenholdt Jacobsen	Norway	3:06.1	+1.8	
6	7	Hanna Falk	Sweden	3:12.3	+8.0	

Semifinal 2

Rank	Seed	Athlete	Country	Time	Deficit	Note
1	15	Vesna Fabjan	Slovenia	3:05.9		Q
2	13	Justyna Kowalczyk	Poland	3:06.2	+0.3	Q
3	8	Laure Barthélémy	France	3:06.7	+0.8	
4	2	Charlotte Kalla	Sweden	3:06.8	+0.9	
5	30	Hanna Brodin	Sweden	3:07.3	+1.4	
6	22	Ida Ingemarsdotter	Sweden	3:08.0	+2.1	

=== Finals ===
Rank	Seed	Athlete	Country	Time	Deficit	Note
1st place, gold medalist(s)	1	Marit Bjørgen	Norway	3:03.9		
2nd place, silver medalist(s)	11	Arianna Follis	Italy	3:04.1	+0.2	
3rd place, bronze medalist(s)	14	Petra Majdič	Slovenia	3:04.4	+0.5	
4	15	Vesna Fabjan	Slovenia	3:04.4	+0.5	
5	13	Justyna Kowalczyk	Poland	3:05.7	+1.8	
6	25	Alena Procházková	Slovakia	3:15.4	+11.5	

== See also ==
- 2011 IPC Biathlon and Cross-Country Skiing World Championships – Women's sprint
