= FIS Nordic World Ski Championships 2013 – Women's 10 kilometre freestyle =

Women's 10 kilometre freestyle at the FIS Nordic World Ski Championships 2013
- Date: 26 February 2013
- Competitors: 79 from 31 nations
- Winning time: 25:23.4

Medalists
| gold medal | Therese Johaug | Norway |
| silver medal | Marit Bjørgen | Norway |
| bronze medal | Yuliya Chekalyova | Russia |

The Women's 10 kilometre freestyle at the FIS Nordic World Ski Championships 2013 was held on 26 February 2013. A 5 km qualifying event took place on 20 February.

== Results ==
=== Race ===
The race was started at 12:45.

| Rank | Bib | Athlete | Country | Time | Deficit |
|---|---|---|---|---|---|
| 1st place, gold medalist(s) | 78 | Therese Johaug | Norway | 25:23.4 | |
| 2nd place, silver medalist(s) | 68 | Marit Bjørgen | Norway | 25:33.6 | +10.2 |
| 3rd place, bronze medalist(s) | 72 | Yuliya Chekalyova | Russia | 25:56.1 | +32.7 |
| 4 | 47 | Miriam Gössner | Germany | 25:56.6 | +33.2 |
| 5 | 52 | Liz Stephen | United States | 26:04.6 | +41.2 |
| 6 | 70 | Heidi Weng | Norway | 26:06.6 | +43.2 |
| 7 | 64 | Charlotte Kalla | Sweden | 26:09.0 | +45.6 |
| 8 | 62 | Riitta-Liisa Roponen | Finland | 26:12.7 | +49.3 |
| 9 | 76 | Kristin Størmer Steira | Norway | 26:25.0 | +1:01.6 |
| 10 | 27 | Coraline Hugue | France | 26:26.2 | +1:02.8 |
| 11 | 60 | Katrin Zeller | Germany | 26:26.6 | +1:03.2 |
| 12 | 46 | Riikka Sarasoja-Lilja | Finland | 26:27.1 | +1:03.7 |
| 13 | 39 | Mariya Gushchina | Russia | 26:30.4 | +1:07.0 |
| 14 | 32 | Kaisa Mäkäräinen | Finland | 26:33.9 | +1:10.5 |
| 15 | 58 | Krista Lähteenmäki | Finland | 26:35.4 | +1:12.0 |
| 16 | 38 | Debora Agreiter | Italy | 26:39.0 | +1:15.6 |
| 17 | 44 | Anna Haag | Sweden | 26:40.5 | +1:17.1 |
| 18 | 36 | Anouk Faivre-Picon | France | 26:46.3 | +1:22.9 |
| 19 | 50 | Emma Wikén | Sweden | 26:49.1 | +1:25.7 |
| 20 | 16 | Marina Piller | Italy | 26:49.4 | +1:26.0 |
| 21 | 34 | Aurore Jéan | France | 26:50.6 | +1:27.2 |
| 22 | 54 | Valentyna Shevchenko | Ukraine | 26:53.2 | +1:29.8 |
| 23 | 40 | Jessie Diggins | United States | 26:55.8 | +1:32.4 |
| 24 | 56 | Denise Herrmann | Germany | 26:56.2 | +1:32.8 |
| 25 | 48 | Nicole Fessel | Germany | 26:59.7 | +1:36.3 |
| 26 | 30 | Teresa Stadlober | Austria | 27:00.8 | +1:37.4 |
| 27 | 42 | Holly Brooks | United States | 27:03.7 | +1:40.3 |
| 28 | 15 | Ekaterina Rudakova | Belarus | 27:08.7 | +1:45.3 |
| 29 | 23 | Laura Orgué | Spain | 27:15.3 | +1:51.9 |
| 30 | 74 | Kikkan Randall | United States | 27:17.8 | +1:54.4 |
| 31 | 9 | Selina Gasparin | Switzerland | 27:21.3 | +1:57.9 |
| 32 | 66 | Martine Ek Hagen | Norway | 27:23.6 | +2:00.2 |
| 33 | 37 | Natalya Zhukova | Russia | 27:25.4 | +2:02.0 |
| 34 | 11 | Paulina Maciuszek | Poland | 27:25.8 | +2:02.4 |
| 35 | 55 | Veronica Cavallar | Italy | 27:26.5 | +2:03.1 |
| 36 | 71 | Agnieszka Szymańczak | Poland | 27:30.1 | +2:06.7 |
| 37 | 77 | Kornelia Kubińska | Poland | 27:34.5 | +2:11.1 |
| 38 | 14 | Alena Sannikova | Belarus | 27:35.8 | +2:12.4 |
| 39 | 28 | Ilaria Debertolis | Italy | 27:36.9 | +2:13.5 |
| 40 | 17 | Daria Gaiazova | Canada | 27:37.6 | +2:14.2 |
| 41 | 25 | Eva Vrabcová-Nývltová | Czech Republic | 27:38.1 | +2:14.7 |
| 42 | 20 | Tetyana Antypenko | Ukraine | 27:39.0 | +2:15.6 |
| 42 | 31 | Alenka Čebašek | Slovenia | 27:39.0 | +2:15.6 |
| 44 | 29 | Barbara Jezeršek | Slovenia | 27:39.5 | +2:16.1 |
| 45 | 8 | Diana Rasimovičiūtė | Lithuania | 27:43.3 | +2:19.9 |
| 46 | 61 | Li Hongxue | China | 27:44.1 | +2:20.7 |
| 47 | 18 | Yuki Kobayashi | Japan | 27:46.5 | +2:23.1 |
| 48 | 59 | Sylwia Jaśkowiec | Poland | 27:54.2 | +2:30.8 |
| 49 | 24 | Maryna Antsybor | Ukraine | 28:04.3 | +2:40.9 |
| 50 | 33 | Anastasia Dotsenko | Russia | 28:05.9 | +2:42.5 |
| 51 | 35 | Lisa Larsen | Sweden | 28:08.6 | +2:45.2 |
| 52 | 73 | Vesna Fabjan | Slovenia | 28:13.2 | +2:49.8 |
| 53 | 75 | Kateryna Grygorenko | Ukraine | 28:14.7 | +2:51.3 |
| 54 | 4 | Natalija Kočergina | Lithuania | 28:32.6 | +3:09.2 |
| 55 | 63 | Viktoriya Lanchakova | Kazakhstan | 28:32.9 | +3:09.5 |
| 56 | 53 | Petra Novaková | Czech Republic | 28:34.3 | +3:10.9 |
| 57 | 22 | Emily Nishikawa | Canada | 28:38.7 | +3:15.3 |
| 58 | 19 | Elena Kolomina | Kazakhstan | 28:44.4 | +3:21.0 |
| 59 | 13 | Marina Matrosova | Kazakhstan | 28:48.5 | +3:25.1 |
| 60 | 67 | Antoniya Grigorova-Burgova | Bulgaria | 28:50.8 | +3:27.4 |
| 61 | 7 | Rosamund Musgrave | Great Britain | 28:54.1 | +3:30.7 |
| 62 | 26 | Lea Einfalt | Slovenia | 28:55.3 | +3:31.9 |
| 63 | 69 | Tatyana Osipova | Kazakhstan | 28:55.4 | +3:32.0 |
| 64 | 49 | Li Xin | China | 29:08.9 | +3:45.5 |
| 65 | 57 | Timeea Sara | Romania | 29:18.7 | +3:55.3 |
| 66 | 21 | Alena Procházková | Slovakia | 29:21.2 | +3:57.8 |
| 67 | 45 | Vedrana Malec | Croatia | 29:35.4 | +4:12.0 |
| 68 | 12 | Brittany Webster | Canada | 29:44.4 | +4:21.0 |
| 69 | 1 | Emőke Szőcs | Hungary | 29:53.3 | +4:29.9 |
| 70 | 43 | Teodora Malcheva | Bulgaria | 30:10.9 | +4:47.5 |
| 71 | 65 | Heidi Raju | Estonia | 30:12.8 | +4:49.4 |
| 72 | 10 | Ingrida Ardišauskaitė | Lithuania | 30:17.3 | +4:53.9 |
| 73 | 51 | Yana Hrakovich | Belarus | 30:22.6 | +4:59.2 |
| 74 | 41 | Fiona Hughes | Great Britain | 30:23.0 | +4:59.6 |
| 75 | 3 | Jaqueline Mourão | Brazil | 30:35.5 | +5:12.1 |
| 76 | 2 | Sarah Young | Great Britain | 30:42.9 | +5:19.5 |
| 77 | 5 | Niviaq Chemnitz Berthelsen | Denmark | 30:55.6 | +5:32.2 |
| | 6 | Guo Liping | China | DNF | |
| | | Tanja Karišik | Bosnia and Herzegovina | DNS | |

=== Qualification ===
The Qualification was held at 12:45.

| Rank | Bib | Athlete | Country | Time | Deficit | Notes |
|---|---|---|---|---|---|---|
| 1 | 43 | Diana Rasimovičiūtė | Lithuania | 13:21.3 | | Q |
| 2 | 38 | Natalija Kočergina | Lithuania | 13:42.0 | +20.7 | Q |
| 3 | 42 | Rosamund Musgrave | Great Britain | 13:55.1 | +33.8 | Q |
| 4 | 29 | Emőke Szőcs | Hungary | 14:02.0 | +40.7 | Q |
| 5 | 41 | Guo Liping | China | 14:06.2 | +44.9 | Q |
| 6 | 21 | Tanja Karišik | Bosnia and Herzegovina | 14:20.2 | +58.9 | Q |
| 7 | 44 | Ingrida Ardišauskaitė | Lithuania | 14:25.1 | +1:03.8 | Q |
| 8 | 40 | Niviaq Chemnitz Berthelsen | Denmark | 14:27.2 | +1:05.9 | Q |
| 9 | 37 | Jaqueline Mourão | Brazil | 14:31.0 | +1:09.7 | Q |
| 10 | 30 | Sarah Young | Great Britain | 14:44.3 | +1:23.0 | Q |
| 11 | 33 | Anna Trinka | Australia | 14:48.4 | +1:27.1 | |
| 12 | 36 | Aimee Watson | Australia | 14:53.9 | +1:32.6 | |
| 13 | 3 | Sarah Murphy | New Zealand | 15:03.6 | +1:42.3 | |
| 14 | 39 | Lescinska Grimmer | Australia | 15:04.1 | +1:42.8 | |
| 15 | 5 | Nadezhda Demineva | Kyrgyzstan | 15:15.9 | +1:54.6 | |
| 16 | 32 | Inga Dauškāne | Latvia | 15:21.0 | +1:59.7 | |
| 17 | 34 | Ildikó Papp | Hungary | 15:25.4 | +2:04.1 | |
| 18 | 19 | Panagiota Tsakiri | Greece | 15:39.5 | +2:18.2 | |
| 18 | 28 | Agnes Simon | Hungary | 15:39.5 | +2:18.2 | |
| 20 | 35 | Nina Broznić | Croatia | 15:45.2 | +2:23.9 | |
| 21 | 24 | Anda Muižniece | Latvia | 15:47.3 | +2:26.0 | |
| 22 | 23 | Alexandra Camenșcic | Moldova | 15:49.2 | +2:27.9 | |
| 23 | 25 | Katya Galstyan | Armenia | 16:05.0 | +2:43.7 | |
| 24 | 11 | Laura Fenyvesi | Hungary | 16:05.5 | +2:44.2 | |
| 25 | 15 | Otgontsetseg Chinbat | Mongolia | 16:05.9 | +2:44.6 | |
| 26 | 27 | Anna Mkhitaryan | Armenia | 16:10.2 | +2:48.9 | |
| 27 | 20 | Signe Schlør | Denmark | 16:13.4 | +2:52.1 | |
| 28 | 10 | Mirlene Picin | Brazil | 16:15.7 | +2:54.4 | |
| 29 | 26 | Syuzanna Varosyan | Armenia | 16:25.7 | +3:04.4 | |
| 30 | 22 | Valya Varosyan | Armenia | 16:31.0 | +3:09.7 | |
| 31 | 17 | Belma Šmrković | Serbia | 16:35.4 | +3:14.1 | |
| 32 | 8 | Snežana Borovčanin | Bosnia and Herzegovina | 16:40.6 | +3:19.3 | |
| 33 | 16 | Dejana Kosarac | Bosnia and Herzegovina | 16:44.9 | +3:23.6 | |
| 34 | 18 | Maria Boumpa | Greece | 16:52.9 | +3:31.6 | |
| 35 | 13 | Natalija Kovalova | Latvia | 16:55.8 | +3:34.5 | |
| 36 | 9 | Marija Kolaroska | Macedonia | 17:07.0 | +3:45.7 | |
| 37 | 31 | Farzaneh Rezasoltani | Iran | 17:27.7 | +4:06.4 | |
| 38 | 2 | Uugantsetseg Nandintsetseg | Mongolia | 17:54.8 | +4:33.5 | |
| 39 | 1 | Anna Berghii | Moldova | 18:09.1 | +4:47.8 | |
| 40 | 7 | Georgia Nimpiti | Greece | 18:27.1 | +5:05.8 | |
| 41 | 4 | Doina Cravcenco | Moldova | 18:52.1 | +5:30.8 | |
| 42 | 6 | Dumitrita Ciobanu | Moldova | 19:31.9 | +6:10.6 | |
| 43 | 14 | Golnaz Savoji Asl | Iran | 19:40.1 | +6:18.8 | |
| 44 | 12 | Azadeh Kiashemshaki | Iran | 20:47.2 | +7:25.9 | |
