= Celine Brun-Lie =

Norwegian cross-country skier

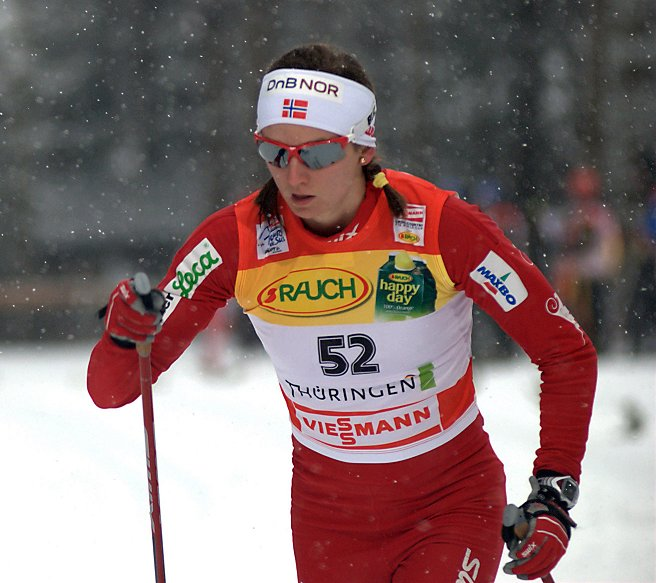

Personal information
- Full name: Celine Marie Knudtzon Brun-Lie
- Born: 18 March 1988 (age 38) Oslo, Norway
- Height: 171 cm (5 ft 7 in)

Sport
- Sport: Skiing
- Club: SK Njård

World Cup career
- Seasons: 9 – (2007–2015)
- Indiv. starts: 91
- Indiv. podiums: 8
- Indiv. wins: 0
- Team starts: 15
- Team podiums: 5
- Team wins: 0
- Overall titles: 0 – (25th in 2013)
- Discipline titles: 0
Medal record
Women's cross-country skiing
Representing Norway
Junior World Championships
Gold medal – first place	2007 Tarvisio	4 × 3.33 km relay
Gold medal – first place	2008 Mals	4 × 3.33 km relay
Bronze medal – third place	2006 Kranj	Individual sprint

Celine Marie Knudtzon Brun-Lie (born 18 March 1988) is a Norwegian former cross-country skier.

She won a bronze medal at the 2006 Junior World Ski Championships, recorded a fourth place at the 2007 Junior World Ski Championships and won a gold medal in relay at the 2008 Junior World Ski Championships. She made her World Cup debut in March 2007 in Stockholm, with a twentieth place. She recorded her first top-ten result in December 2007, with a tenth place in Rybinsk, and finished on the podium for the first time in December 2008, when she finished second in the sprint race in Davos. She also competed at the FIS Nordic World Ski Championships 2009, recording a twelfth place in the sprint.

At the 2010 Winter Olympics in Vancouver she reached the finals of both her events, coming sixth in the Individual Sprint and fifth (with Astrid Jacobsen) in the Team Sprint.

She represents the sports club Njård IL, and lives in Trondheim. She is a student at the Norwegian University of Science and Technology. She has three siblings and speaks Norwegian, English, and French.

In February 2015, Brun-Lie announced that she was retiring from top-level skiing after the 2015 season, aiming to complete her civil engineer studies at the Norwegian University of Science and Technology.

== Cross-country skiing results ==
All results are sourced from the International Ski Federation (FIS).

=== Olympic Games ===
Year	Age	10 km individual	15 km skiathlon	30 km mass start	Sprint	4 × 5 km relay	Team sprint
2010	21	—	—	—	6	—	5

=== World Championships ===
Year	Age	10 km individual	15 km skiathlon	30 km mass start	Sprint	4 × 5 km relay	Team sprint
2009	20	—	—	—	11	—	—
2011	22	—	—	—	14	—	—
2013	26	—	—	—	24	—	—
2015	28	—	—	—	9	—	—

=== World Cup ===
==== Season standings ====
Season	Age	Discipline standings			Ski Tour standings		
Season	Age	Overall	Distance	Sprint	Nordic Opening	Tour de Ski	World Cup Final
2007	19	92	—	58	—N/a	—	—N/a
2008	20	63	—	44	—N/a	—	—
2009	21	27	57	9	—N/a	—	26
2010	22	33	42	17	—N/a	DNF	23
2011	23	38	NC	14	DNF	—	40
2012	24	82	NC	58	DNF	—	—
2013	25	25	52	6	29	—	24
2014	26	42	73	16	30	—	35
2015	27	26	NC	7	DNF	—	—N/a

==== Individual podiums ====
- 8 podiums – (5 WC, 3 SWC)

No.	Season	Date	Location	Race	Level	Place
1	2008–09	14 December 2008	Davos, Switzerland	1.4 km Sprint F	World Cup	2nd
2	2009–10	4 January 2010	Prague, Czech Republic	1.2 km Sprint F	Stage World Cup	2nd
3	2010–11	15 January 2011	Liberec, Czech Republic	1.3 km Sprint F	Stage World Cup	3rd
4	2012–13	15 December 2012	Canmore, Canada	1.3 km Sprint F	World Cup	3rd
5	2012–13	1 February 2013	Sochi, Russia	1.25 km Sprint F	World Cup	3rd
6	2014–15	5 December 2014	Lillehammer, Norway	1.5 km Sprint F	Stage World Cup	2nd
7	2014–15	14 December 2014	Davos, Switzerland	1.3 km Sprint F	World Cup	3rd
8	2014–15	17 January 2015	Otepää, Estonia	1.2 km Sprint C	World Cup	3rd

==== Team podiums ====
- 5 podiums – (5 TS)

No.	Season	Date	Location	Race	Level	Place	Teammate
1	2008–09	21 December 2008	Düsseldorf, Germany	6 × 0.8 km Team Sprint F	World Cup	2nd	Falla
2	2009–10	6 December 2009	Düsseldorf, Germany	6 × 0.8 km Team Sprint F	World Cup	3rd	Falla
3	2010–11	5 December 2010	Düsseldorf, Germany	6 × 0.9 km Team Sprint F	World Cup	2nd	Falla
4	2010–11	16 January 2011	Liberec, Czech Republic	6 × 1.3 km Team Sprint C	World Cup	3rd	Gjeitnes
5	2012–13	7 December 2012	Quebec City, Canada	6 × 1.6 km Team Sprint F	World Cup	3rd	Falla
