= FIS Nordic World Ski Championships 2011 – Women's 10 kilometre classical =

Women's 10 km classical interval start at the FIS Nordic World Ski Championships 2011
- Venue: Holmenkollen National Arena
- Date: 28 February 2011
- Competitors: 67
- Winning time: 27:39.3

Medalists
gold medal	Marit Bjørgen	Norway
silver medal	Justyna Kowalczyk	Poland
bronze medal	Aino-Kaisa Saarinen	Finland

The Women's 10 kilometre classical at the FIS Nordic World Ski Championships 2011 was held on 28 February 2011 at 13:00 CET. A 5 km qualifying event took place on 23 February. The defending world champion was Finland's Aino-Kaisa Saarinen while the defending Olympic champion (on freestyle) was Sweden's Charlotte Kalla.

== Results ==
Rank	Bib	Athlete	Country	Time	Deficit
1st place, gold medalist(s)	66	Marit Bjørgen	Norway	27:39.3	
2nd place, silver medalist(s)	67	Justyna Kowalczyk	Poland	27:43.4	+4.1
3rd place, bronze medalist(s)	62	Aino-Kaisa Saarinen	Finland	27:49.0	+9.7
4	64	Therese Johaug	Norway	28:03.0	+23.7
5	59	Krista Lähteenmäki	Finland	28:03.2	+23.9
6	42	Pirjo Muranen	Finland	28:06.1	+26.8
7	65	Marianna Longa	Italy	28:08.2	+28.9
8	46	Kerttu Niskanen	Finland	28:29.0	+49.7
9	55	Vibeke Skofterud	Norway	28:40.2	+1:00.9
10	53	Kristin Størmer Steira	Norway	28:42.9	+1:03.6
11	63	Charlotte Kalla	Sweden	28:46.7	+1:07.4
12	57	Yuliya Chekalyova	Russia	28:51.8	+1:12.5
13	58	Petra Majdič	Slovenia	28:55.7	+1:16.4
14	60	Anna Haag	Sweden	29:00.1	+1:20.8
15	40	Kateřina Smutná	Austria	29:08.8	+1:29.5
16	54	Valentyna Shevchenko	Ukraine	29:09.4	+1:30.1
17	52	Masako Ishida	Japan	29:12.9	+1:33.6
18	61	Riitta-Liisa Roponen	Finland	29:22.9	+1:43.6
19	45	Aliya Iksanova	Russia	29:27.7	+1:48.4
20	39	Elena Kolomina	Kazakhstan	29:31.6	+1:52.3
21	47	Valentina Novikova	Russia	29:36.8	+1:57.5
22	56	Katrin Zeller	Germany	29:36.9	+1:57.6
23	50	Laure Barthélémy	France	29:46.1	+2:06.8
24	43	Svetlana Malakhova-Shishkina	Kazakhstan	29:49.3	+2:10.0
25	35	Sara Lindborg	Sweden	29:52.1	+2:12.8
26	36	Svetlana Nikolayeva	Russia	29:52.3	+2:13.0
27	37	Holly Brooks	United States	29:54.2	+2:14.9
28	48	Ida Ingemarsdotter	Sweden	30:02.1	+2:22.8
29	26	Sadie Bjornsen	United States	30:06.8	+2:27.5
30	33	Alena Sannikova	Belarus	30:14.4	+2:35.1
31	27	Tatyana Roshchina	Kazakhstan	30:20.1	+2:40.8
32	49	Kikkan Randall	United States	30:21.2	+2:41.9
33	29	Doris Trachsel	Switzerland	30:24.8	+2:45.5
34	38	Virginia de Martin Topranin	Italy	30:31.8	+2:52.5
35	41	Kateryna Grygorenko	Ukraine	30:36.5	+2:57.2
36	16	Lada Nesterenko	Ukraine	30:38.6	+2:59.3
37	31	Daria Gaiazova	Canada	30:38.8	+2:59.5
38	28	Laura Orgué	Spain	30:44.5	+3:05.2
39	25	Perianne Jones	Canada	30:44.6	+3:05.3
40	12	Zoya Zaviedieieva	Ukraine	30:45.4	+3:06.1
41	22	Vesna Fabjan	Slovenia	30:46.1	+3:06.8
42	30	Lucia Anger	Germany	30:46.3	+3:07.0
43	44	Denise Herrmann	Germany	30:47.4	+3:08.1
44	13	Anja Eržen	Slovenia	30:57.4	+3:18.1
45	19	Laura Rohtla	Estonia	31:02.5	+3:23.2
46	20	Alenka Čebašek	Slovenia	31:03.8	+3:24.5
47	32	Paulina Maciuszek	Poland	31:12.3	+3:33.0
48	23	Triin Ojaste	Estonia	31:14.2	+3:34.9
49	14	Oxana Yatskaya	Kazakhstan	31:14.6	+3:35.3
50	21	Mónika György	Romania	31:15.0	+3:35.7
51	15	Ida Sargent	United States	31:19.3	+3:40.0
52	17	Chandra Crawford	Canada	31:22.7	+3:43.4
53	24	Michito Kashiwabara	Japan	31:33.5	+3:54.2
54	18	Ewelina Marcisz	Poland	31:48.5	+4:09.2
55	11	Agnieszka Szymańczak	Poland	31:54.9	+4:15.6
56	34	Brooke Gosling	Canada	32:27.7	+4:48.4
57	10	Teodora Malcheva	Bulgaria	33:40.0	+6:00.7
58	7	Ingrida Ardišauskaitė	Lithuania	33:42.7	+6:03.4
59	6	Vedrana Malec	Croatia	34:04.2	+6:24.9
60	9	Rosamund Musgrave	United Kingdom	34:17.3	+6:38.0
61	3	Nina Broznić	Croatia	34:42.7	+7:03.4
62	5	Jaqueline Mourão	Brazil	35:07.1	+7:27.8
63	8	Niviaq Chemnitz Berthelsen	Denmark	35:37.4	+7:58.1
64	2	Syuzanna Varosyan	Armenia	36:49.9	+9:10.6
65	1	Mirlene Picin	Brazil	36:51.6	+9:12.3
66	4	Sarah Young	United Kingdom	36:59.4	+9:20.1
	51	Alena Procházková	Slovakia	DNS	

== Qualification ==
Rank	Bib	Athlete	Country	Time	Deficit	Notes
1	16	Niviaq Chemnitz Berthelsen	Denmark	17:45.9		Q
2	11	Nina Broznić	Croatia	18:27.7	+41.8	Q
3	15	Ingrida Ardisauskaite	Lithuania	18:34.8	+48.9	Q
4	14	Vedrana Malec	Croatia	18:38.8	+52.9	Q
5	9	Lina Kreivenaite	Lithuania	19:03.4	+1:17.5	Q
6	12	Sarah Young	United Kingdom	19:05.6	+1:19.7	Q
7	13	Jaqueline Mourão	Brazil	19:15.2	+1:29.3	Q
8	10	Syuzanna Varosyan	Armenia	19:59.6	+2:13.7	Q
9	7	Mirlene Picin	Brazil	20:20.4	+2:34.5	Q
10	1	Irina Khodiakova	Kyrgyzstan	20:21.6	+2:35.7	Q
11	4	Agnes Simon	Hungary	20:33.1	+2:47.2	
12	2	Ildiko Papp	Hungary	21:00.4	+3:14.5	
13	6	Vera Viczián	Hungary	21:01.5	+3:15.6	
14	8	Valya Varosyan	Armenia	21:52.6	+4:06.7	
15	3	Orsolya Marosffy	Hungary	23:05.4	+5:19.5	
16	5	Olga Reshetkova	Kyrgyzstan	24:43.1	+6:57.2	
