= Perianne Jones =

Canadian cross-country skier

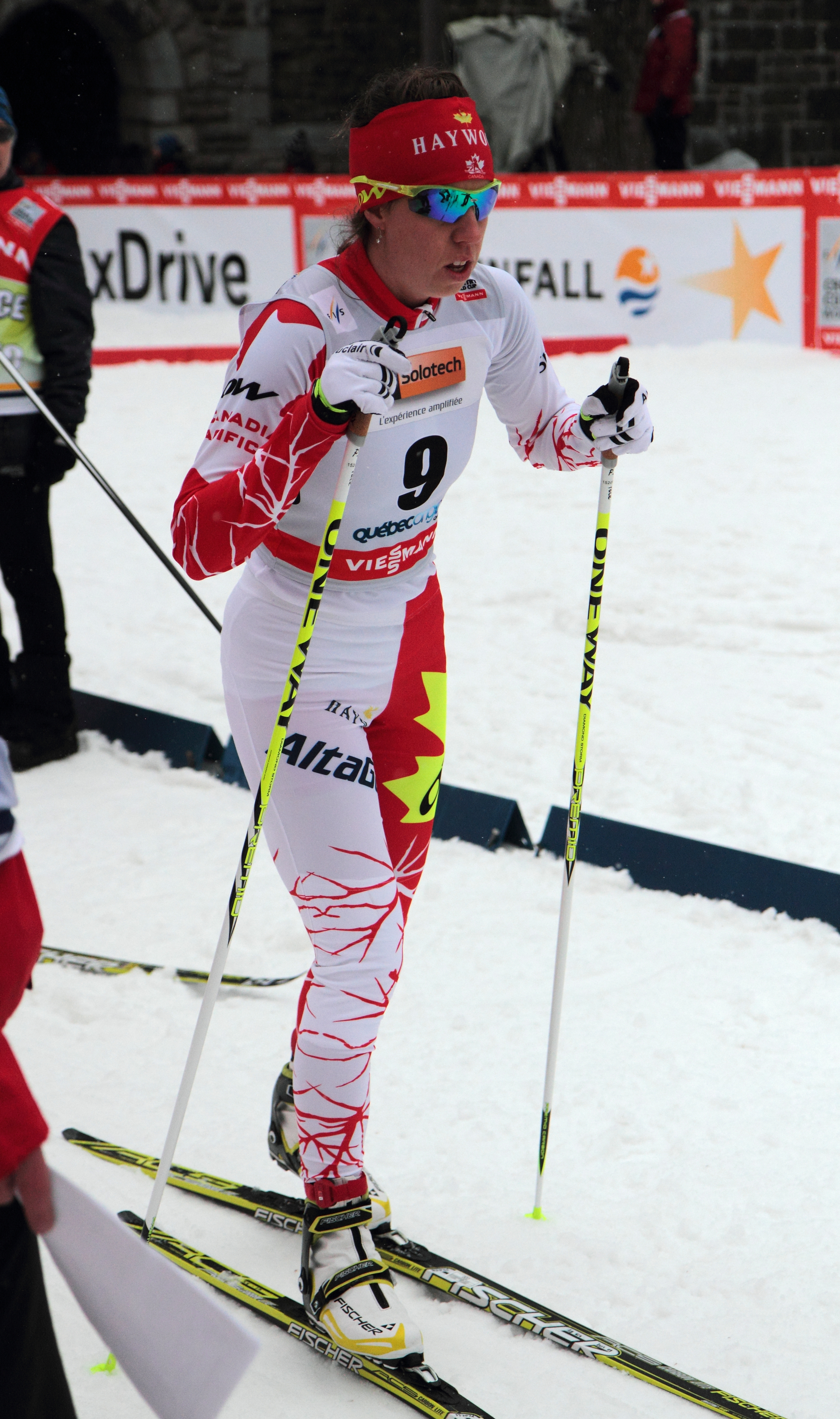
- Jones at 2012 Cross-Country World Cup

Personal information
- Nationality: Canada
- Born: 18 February 1985 (age 41) Almonte, Ontario, Canada
- Height: 167 cm (5 ft 6 in)

Sport
- Sport: Skiing
- Club: Nakkertok Ski Club

World Cup career
- Seasons: 10 – (2006–2015)
- Indiv. starts: 78
- Indiv. podiums: 0
- Team starts: 10
- Team podiums: 2
- Team wins: 0
- Overall titles: 0 – (53rd in 2013)
- Discipline titles: 0

Perianne Jones (born 18 February 1985 in Almonte, Canada) is a Canadian cross-country skier who between 2002 and 2015.

She competed at the 2010 Winter Olympics in Vancouver in the women's individual sprint classic and 15km pursuit competitions. In the sprint competition on 17 February, she placed 41st with a time of 3:54.27 (16.22 behind first).

At the FIS Nordic World Ski Championships 2009 in Liberec, Jones finished sixth in the team sprint, 48th in the 10 km, and 54th in the individual sprint events.

Her best World Cup finish was third in a team sprint in Milan, Italy in 2012 while her best individual finish was 19th in an individual sprint event in Canada in 2009.

== Cross-country skiing results ==
All results are sourced from the International Ski Federation (FIS).

=== Olympic Games ===
Year	Age	10 km individual	15 km skiathlon	30 km mass start	Sprint	4 × 5 km relay	Team sprint
2010	25	—	56	—	41	15	—
2014	29	—	—	—	22	13	10

=== World Championships ===
Year	Age	10 km individual	15 km skiathlon	30 km mass start	Sprint	4 × 5 km relay	Team sprint
2009	24	48	—	—	54	—	6
2011	26	39	—	—	29	14	6
2013	28	—	—	—	48	DNF	13
2015	30	32	37	—	24	—	—

=== World Cup ===
==== Season standings ====
Season	Age	Discipline standings			Ski Tour standings		
Season	Age	Overall	Distance	Sprint	Nordic Opening	Tour de Ski	World Cup Final
2006	21	NC	NC	NC	—N/a	—N/a	—N/a
2007	22	NC	NC	NC	—N/a	47	—N/a
2008	23	104	—	80	—N/a	—	—
2009	24	80	88	59	—N/a	—	DNF
2010	25	117	—	81	—N/a	—	—
2011	26	80	NC	55	—	—	41
2012	27	72	82	47	57	—	—
2013	28	53	NC	27	DNF	—	—
2014	29	78	NC	48	—	DNF	—
2015	30	104	NC	63	DNF	—	—N/a

==== Team podiums ====
- 2 podiums – (2 TS)

No.	Season	Date	Location	Race	Level	Place	Teammate
1	2011–12	15 January 2012	Milan, Italy	6 × 1.4 km Team Sprint F	World Cup	3rd	Crawford
2	2012–13	3 February 2013	Sochi, Russia	6 × 1.25 km Team Sprint C	World Cup	3rd	Gaiazova
