= Kaija Vahtra =

Estonian cross-country skier (born 1986)

Personal information
- Nationality: Estonia
- Born: 4 December 1986 (age 39) Võru, then part of Estonian SSR, Soviet Union

Sport
- Sport: Skiing

World Cup career
- Seasons: 8 – (2005, 2007–2011, 2013–2014)
- Indiv. starts: 34
- Indiv. podiums: 0
- Team starts: 2
- Team podiums: 0
- Overall titles: 0 – (80th in 2010)
- Discipline titles: 0

Kaija Vahtra (née Udras, born 4 December 1986) is an Estonian cross-country skier who has competed since 2005. At the 2010 Winter Olympics in Vancouver, she finished 16th in the team sprint, 31st in the individual sprint, and did not finish the 7.5 km + 7.5 km double pursuit events.

Vahtra competed at the FIS Nordic World Ski Championships 2009 in Liberec, finishing 11th in the team sprint, 15th in the 4 × 5 km relay, 21st in the individual sprint, and 54th in the 10 km event. Her best World Cup finish was 18th in a team sprint event at Germany in 2008 while her best individual finish was 19th in an individual sprint event at Slovenia in 2009.

== Cross-country skiing results ==
All results are sourced from the International Ski Federation (FIS).

=== Olympic Games ===
Year	Age	10 km individual	15 km skiathlon	30 km mass start	Sprint	4 × 5 km relay	Team sprint
2010	23	—	DNF	—	31	—	15

=== World Championships ===
Year	Age	10 km individual	15 km skiathlon	30 km mass start	Sprint	4 × 5 km relay	Team sprint
2009	22	54	—	—	21	14	11
2011	24	—	—	—	65	—	—
2013	26	—	52	—	67	13	—

=== World Cup ===
==== Season standings ====
Season	Age	Discipline standings			Ski Tour standings		
Season	Age	Overall	Distance	Sprint	Nordic Opening	Tour de Ski	World Cup Final
2005	18	NC	NC	—	—N/a	—N/a	—N/a
2007	20	NC	NC	—	—N/a	—	—N/a
2008	21	NC	NC	NC	—N/a	—	—
2009	22	113	NC	75	—N/a	—	DNF
2010	23	80	99	55	—N/a	—	—
2011	24	NC	NC	NC	DNF	—	—
2013	26	NC	NC	NC	—	—	—
2014	27	NC	—	NC	—	—	—
