= Vesna Fabjan =

Slovenian cross-country skier

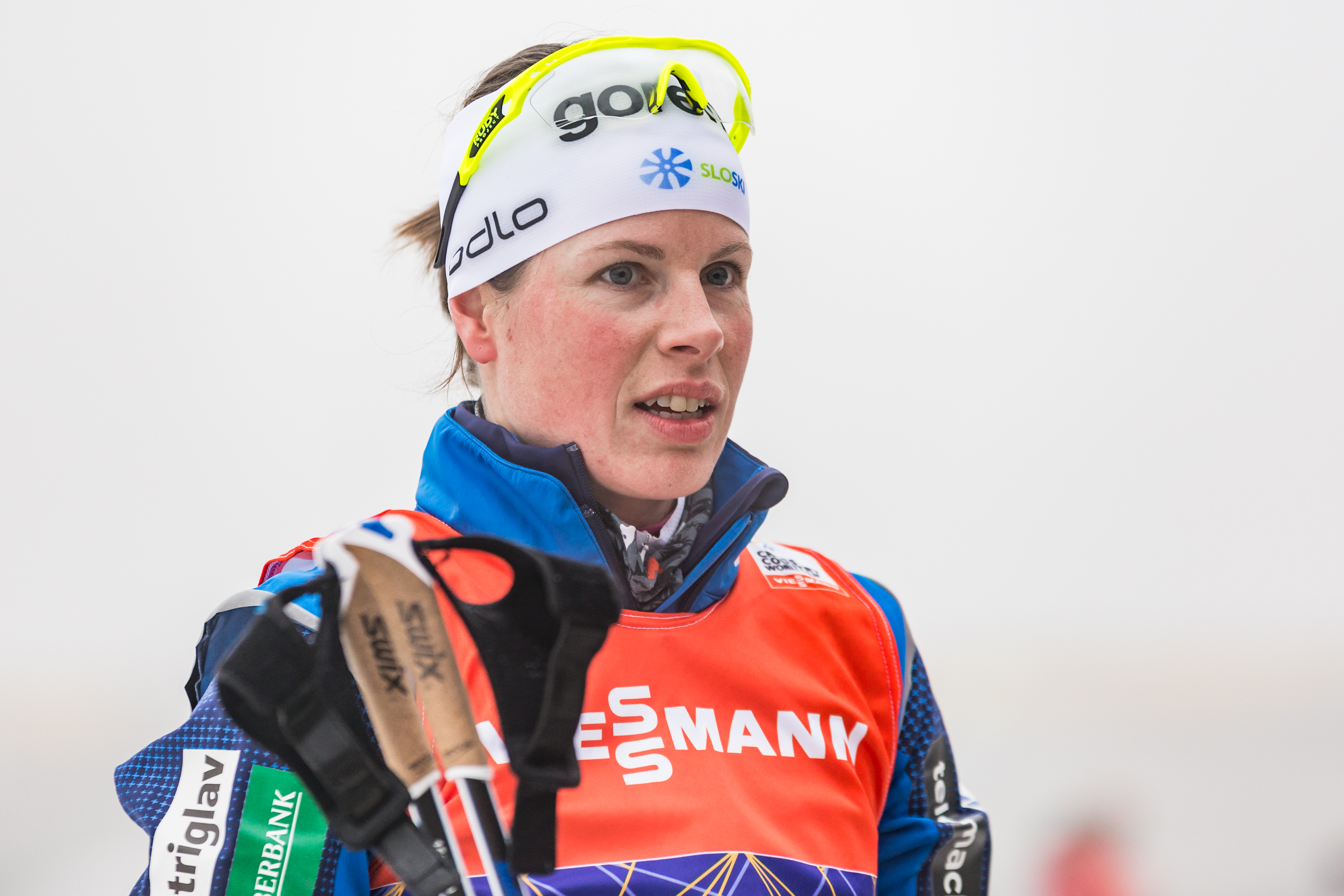
- Vesna Fabjan in January 2018

Personal information
- Nationality: Slovenia
- Born: 13 March 1985 (age 41) Kranj, SR Slovenia, Socialist Federal Republic of Yugoslavia
- Height: 1.70 m (5 ft 7 in)

Sport
- Sport: Skiing
- Club: TSK Merkur

World Cup career
- Seasons: 16 – (2005–2020)
- Indiv. starts: 209
- Indiv. podiums: 5
- Indiv. wins: 2
- Team starts: 28
- Team podiums: 1
- Team wins: 0
- Overall titles: 0 – (21st in 2010)
- Discipline titles: 0
Medal record
Women's cross-country skiing
Representing Slovenia
Olympic Games
Bronze medal – third place	2014 Sochi	Individual sprint
U23 World Championships
Gold medal – first place	2008 Mals	Individual sprint
- Updated on 30 March 2020

Vesna Fabjan (born 13 March 1985) is a Slovenian cross-country skier who has competed since 2001. Competing in three Winter Olympics, her best finish is third in the individual sprint event at Sochi in 2014.

Fabjan's best finish at the FIS Nordic World Ski Championships was fourth in the individual sprint in Oslo in 2011. She finished ninth in the team sprint event in Sapporo in 2007.

Her two World Cup victories were achieved at a sprint freestyle event in Russia in January 2010 and February 2011.

Fabjan finished third in the individual sprint to win bronze at the Sochi 2014 Winter Olympic Games.

In June 2020, she announced her retirement.

== Cross-country skiing results ==
All results are sourced from the International Ski Federation (FIS).

=== Olympic Games ===
- 1 medal – (1 bronze)

Year	Age	10 km individual	15 km skiathlon	30 km mass start	Sprint	4 × 5 km relay	Team sprint
2006	20	—	—	—	40	—	14
2010	24	33	—	—	23	14	10
2014	28	—	—	—	3rd	10	—
2018	32	—	—	—	—	8	—

=== World Championships ===
Year	Age	10 km individual	15 km skiathlon	30 km mass start	Sprint	4 × 5 km relay	Team sprint
2005	19	—	—	—	34	—	—
2007	21	57	—	—	37	—	9
2009	23	53	—	—	16	—	—
2011	25	41	—	—	4	7	—
2013	27	52	—	—	29	14	6
2017	31	59	—	—	26	—	—

=== World Cup ===
Season Standings
Season	Age	Discipline standings			Ski Tour standings				
Season	Age	Overall	Distance	Sprint	Nordic Opening	Tour de Ski	Ski Tour 2020	World Cup Final	Ski Tour Canada
2005	19	NC	—	NC	—N/a	—N/a	—N/a	—N/a	—N/a
2006	20	103	—	68	—N/a	—N/a	—N/a	—N/a	—N/a
2007	21	56	NC	32	—N/a	48	—N/a	—N/a	—N/a
2008	22	37	NC	23	—N/a	40	—N/a	53	—N/a
2009	23	34	91	12	—N/a	33	—N/a	52	—N/a
2010	24	21	97	7	—N/a	DNF	—N/a	37	—N/a
2011	25	29	89	9	DNF	DNF	—N/a	36	—N/a
2012	26	31	68	10	DNF	DNF	—N/a	38	—N/a
2013	27	60	NC	31	DNF	DNF	—N/a	—	—N/a
2014	28	34	NC	11	—	—	—N/a	40	—N/a
2015	29	67	—	37	DNF	—	—N/a	—N/a	—N/a
2016	30	35	79	16	DNF	DNF	—N/a	—N/a	35
2017	31	49	NC	22	DNF	DNF	—N/a	37	—N/a
2018	32	58	NC	28	—	DNF	—N/a	DNF	—N/a
2019	33	75	NC	38	DNF	DNF	—N/a	DNF	—N/a
2020	34	97	NC	66	—	DNF	—	—N/a	—N/a

==== Individual podiums ====
- 2 victories – (2 WC)
- 5 podiums – (5 WC)

No.	Season	Date	Location	Race	Level	Place
1	2009–10	5 December 2009	Düsseldorf, Germany	0.8 km Sprint F	World Cup	3rd
2	2009–10	22 January 2010	Rybinsk, Russia	1.0 km Sprint F	World Cup	1st
3	2010–11	4 December 2010	Düsseldorf, Germany	0.9 km Sprint F	World Cup	3rd
4	2010–11	5 February 2011	Rybinsk, Russia	1.3 km Sprint F	World Cup	1st
5	2013–14	18 January 2014	Szklarska Poręba, Poland	1.5 km Sprint F	World Cup	3rd

==== Team podiums ====
- 1 podium – (1 TS)

No.	Season	Date	Location	Race	Level	Place	Teammate
1	2009–10	24 January 20,101	Rybinsk, Russia	6 × 1.3 km Team Sprint F	World Cup	2nd	Višnar

Olympic Games
Preceded by Tomaž Razingar	Flagbearer for Slovenia; PyeongChang 2018	Succeeded by Ilka Štuhec and Rok Marguč
