= Yuliya Chekalyova =

Russian cross-country skier

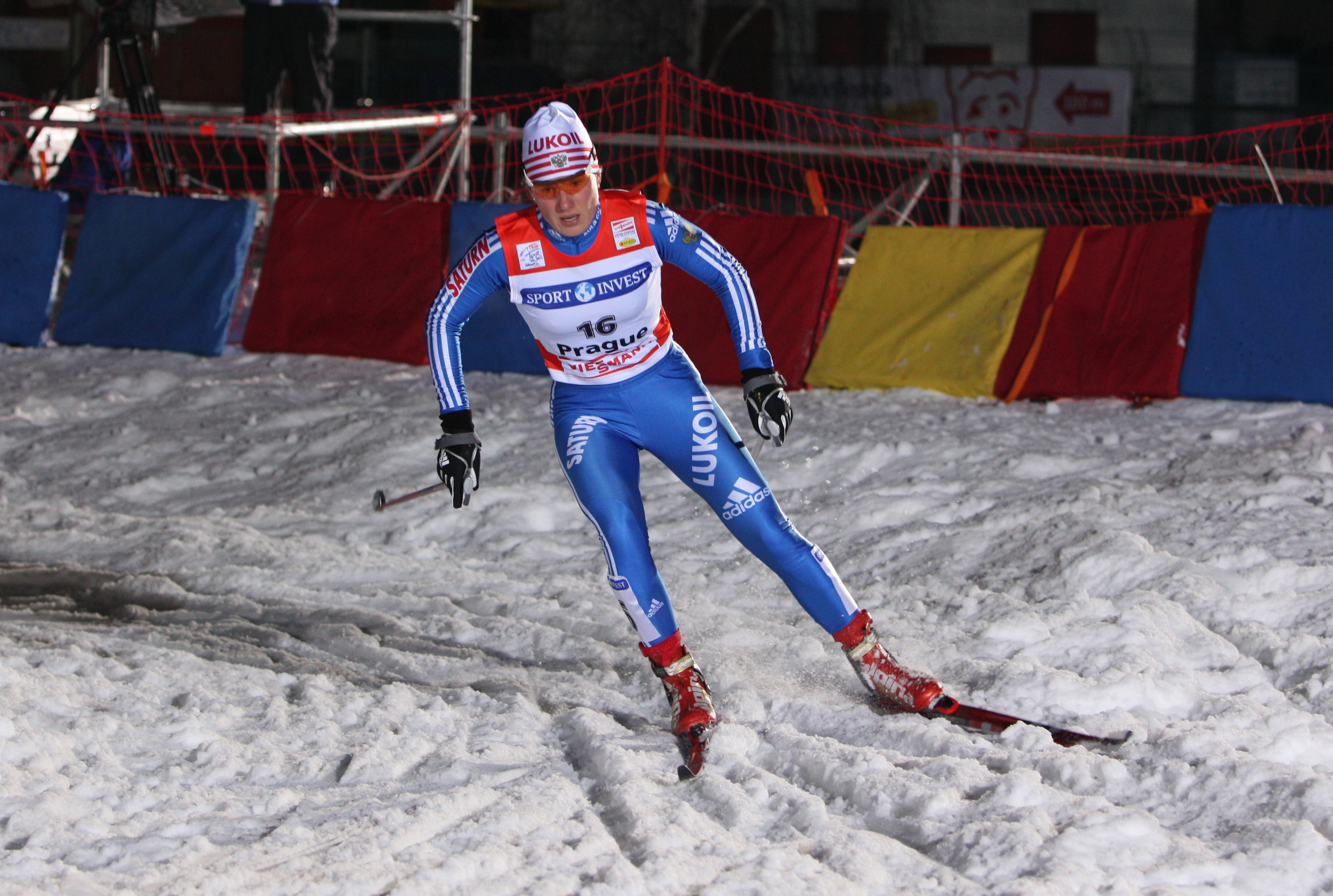
- Chekalyova in 2010

Personal information
- Full name: Yuliya Vladimirovna Chekalyova
- Nationality: Russia
- Born: 6 February 1984 (age 42) Vologda, Soviet Union

Sport
- Sport: Skiing

World Cup career
- Seasons: 10 – (2006–2011, 2013–2015, 2017)
- Indiv. starts: 123
- Indiv. podiums: 4
- Indiv. wins: 0
- Team starts: 10
- Team podiums: 2
- Team wins: 0
- Overall titles: 0 – (11th in 2017)
- Discipline titles: 0
Medal record
Women's cross-country skiing
Representing Russia
World Championships
| Bronze medal – third place | 2013 Val di Fiemme | 10 km freestyle |
| Bronze medal – third place | 2013 Val di Fiemme | 4 × 5 km relay |
U23 World Championships
| Gold medal – first place | 2007 Tarvisio | 15 km skiathlon |
| Bronze medal – third place | 2006 Kranj | 10 km classical |
| Bronze medal – third place | 2006 Kranj | 15 km skiathlon |

Yuliya Vladimirovna Chekalyova (Russian: Юлия Владимировна Чекалёва, also romanized Yulia Tchekaleva, born 6 February 1984) is a Russian cross-country skier who competed between 2005 and 2018.

== Career ==
Her best World Cup finish was 11th in a 15 km event in Russia in 2007.

At the FIS Nordic World Ski Championships 2007 in Sapporo, she finished 16th in the 10 km and 22nd in the 30 km events.

Chekalyova is married to Alexey Kuritsyn, with whom she has a son, Matvey, born in 2012.

On 1 December 2017 she was disqualified from the 2014 Winter Olympics, her results (including sixth place in the relay) were annulled, and she was banned for life from the Olympic games as a result of a positive doping test.

== Cross-country skiing results ==
All results are sourced from the International Ski Federation (FIS).

=== Olympic Games ===
| Year | Age | 10 km individual | 15 km skiathlon | 30 km mass start | Sprint | 4 × 5 km relay | Team sprint |
|---|---|---|---|---|---|---|---|
| 2014 | 28 | DSQ | DSQ | DSQ | — | DSQ | — |

=== World Championships ===
- 2 medals – (2 bronze)

| Year | Age | 10 km individual | 15 km skiathlon | 30 km mass start | Sprint | 4 × 5 km relay | Team sprint |
|---|---|---|---|---|---|---|---|
| 2007 | 23 | 16 | — | 22 | — | — | — |
| 2011 | 27 | 12 | 12 | 26 | — | 6 | — |
| 2013 | 29 | Bronze | 7 | 13 | — | Bronze | — |
| 2015 | 31 | 28 | 16 | — | — | 7 | — |
| 2017 | 33 | 18 | 7 | 10 | — | 5 | — |

=== World Cup ===
Season standings
| Season | Age | Discipline standings | | | Ski Tour standings | | |
| Season | Age | Overall | Distance | Sprint | Nordic Opening | Tour de Ski | World Cup Final |
|---|---|---|---|---|---|---|---|
| 2006 | 22 | 94 | 68 | — | —N/a | —N/a | —N/a |
| 2007 | 23 | 55 | 40 | NC | —N/a | 27 | —N/a |
| 2008 | 24 | 48 | 31 | 62 | —N/a | 28 | 31 |
| 2009 | 25 | 72 | 44 | — | —N/a | — | — |
| 2010 | 26 | 27 | 20 | 78 | —N/a | 12 | — |
| 2011 | 27 | 16 | 14 | 53 | 5 | DNF | 20 |
| 2013 | 29 | 12 | 9 | 72 | DNF | 14 | 10 |
| 2014 | 30 | 15 | 10 | NC | 7 | — | 7 |
| 2015 | 31 | 18 | 9 | NC | 11 | — | —N/a |
| 2017 | 33 | 11 | 10 | NC | 6 | 10 | 23 |

==== Individual podiums ====
- 4 podiums – (3 WC, 1 SWC)

| No. | Season | Date | Location | Race | Level | Place |
|---|---|---|---|---|---|---|
| 1 | 2012–13 | 1 December 2012 | Rukatunturi, Finland | 5 km Individual F | Stage World Cup | 3rd |
| 2 | 2012–13 | 2 February 2013 | Sochi Russia | 7.5 km + 7.5 km Skiathlon C/F | World Cup | 2nd |
| 3 | 2012–13 | 17 March 2013 | Oslo, Norway | 30 km Mass Start F | World Cup | 3rd |
| 4 | 2013–14 | 19 January 2014 | Szklarska Poręba, Poland | 10 km Mass Start C | World Cup | 2nd |

==== Team podiums ====
- 2 podiums – (2 RL)

| No. | Season | Date | Location | Race | Level | Place | Teammates |
|---|---|---|---|---|---|---|---|
| 1 | 2007–08 | 9 December 2007 | Davos, Switzerland | 4 × 5 km Relay C/F | World Cup | 3rd | Kurkina / Rocheva / Korostelyova |
| 2 | 2010–11 | 6 February 2011 | Rybinsk, Russia | 4 × 5 km Relay C/F | World Cup | 2nd | Novikova / Nikolaeva / Mikhaylova |
