= Ágnes Simon =

Ágnes Simon may refer to:

- Agnes Simon (born 1935), former table tennis player from Hungary
- Ágnes Simon (skier) (born 1974), cross-country skier for Hungary
