= Agnieszka Szymańczak =

Polish cross-country skier

Personal information
- Nationality: Poland
- Born: 11 November 1984 (age 41) Wilkowice, Poland

Sport
- Sport: Skiing
- Club: LKS Klimczok Bystra

World Cup career
- Seasons: 2011–2014
- Indiv. starts: 22
- Indiv. podiums: 0
- Team starts: 4
- Team podiums: 0
- Overall titles: 0 – (103rd in 2012)
- Discipline titles: 0

Agnieszka Szymańczak (born 11 November 1984) is a Polish cross-country skier. She competed at the 2014 Winter Olympics in Sochi, in skiathlon and women's classical.

== Cross-country skiing results ==
All results are sourced from the International Ski Federation (FIS).

=== Olympic Games ===
Year	Age	10 km individual	15 km skiathlon	30 km mass start	Sprint	4 × 5 km relay	Team sprint
2014	29	—	44	—	40	—	—

=== World Championships ===
Year	Age	10 km individual	15 km skiathlon	30 km mass start	Sprint	4 × 5 km relay	Team sprint
2011	26	55	DNS	47	49	8	—
2013	28	36	27	—	40	9	9

=== World Cup ===
==== Season standings ====
Season	Age	Discipline standings			Ski Tour standings		
Season	Age	Overall	Distance	Sprint	Nordic Opening	Tour de Ski	World Cup Final
2011	26	NC	NC	NC	66	—	—
2012	27	103	NC	73	—	—	—
2013	28	NC	—	NC	—	—	—
2014	29	112	NC	73	DNF	—	—
