= Émilie Vina =

French cross-country skier (born 1982)

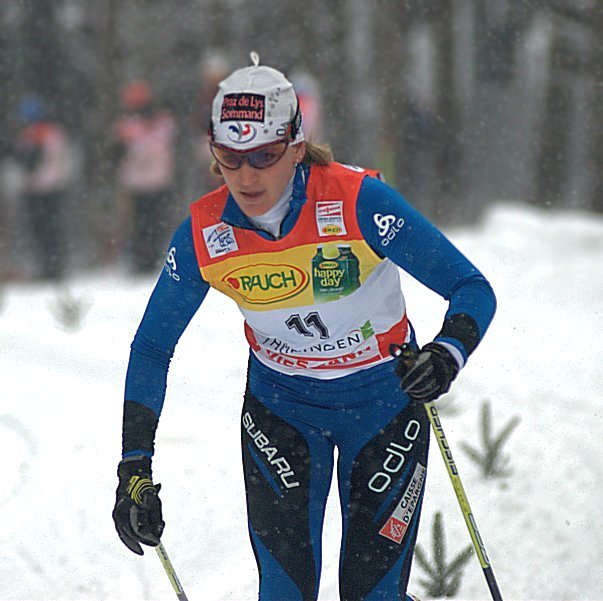
- Émilie Vina in 2010

Personal information
- Nationality: France
- Born: 24 March 1982 (age 44) Bonneville, Haute-Savoie, France

Sport
- Sport: Skiing
- Club: Defense 27e BCA Annecy

World Cup career
- Seasons: 10 – (2003–2012)
- Indiv. starts: 72
- Indiv. podiums: 0
- Team starts: 20
- Team podiums: 0
- Overall titles: 0 – (60th in 2005)
- Discipline titles: 0
Medal record
Women's cross-country skiing
Representing France
U23 World Championships
| Silver medal – second place | 2005 Oberstdorf | Individual sprint |
| Bronze medal – third place | 2003 Valdidentro | Individual sprint |
| Bronze medal – third place | 2005 Oberstdorf | 10 km freestyle |

Émilie Vina (born 24 March 1982, in Bonneville, Haute-Savoie) is a French cross-country skier and non-commissioned officer who has competed since 2000. Competing in two Winter Olympics, she earned her best finish of ninth in the 4 × 5 km relay at Turin in 2006 and had her best individual finish of 47th in the individual sprint event at those same games.

Vina's best finish at the FIS Nordic World Ski Championships was ninth in the 4 × 5 km relay at Val di Fiemme in 2003 while her best individual finish was 36th in the individual sprint event at those same championships.

Her best World Cup finish was fifth twice (2004, 2006) while her best individual finish was 14th in an individual sprint event at Germany in 2005.

== Cross-country skiing results ==
All results are sourced from the International Ski Federation (FIS).

=== Olympic Games ===
| Year | Age | 10 km individual | 15 km skiathlon | 30 km mass start | Sprint | 4 × 5 km relay | Team sprint |
|---|---|---|---|---|---|---|---|
| 2006 | 23 | — | — | — | 47 | 9 | — |
| 2010 | 27 | — | 48 | — | — | — | — |

=== World Championships ===
| Year | Age | 10 km | 15 km | Pursuit | 30 km | Sprint | 4 × 5 km relay | Team sprint |
|---|---|---|---|---|---|---|---|---|
| 2003 | 20 | — | — | — | — | 36 | 9 | —N/a |
| 2005 | 22 | 59 | —N/a | — | — | 47 | — | — |
| 2011 | 28 | — | —N/a | — | 45 | 50 | 13 | — |

=== World Cup ===
==== Season standings ====
| Season | Age | Discipline standings | | | Ski Tour standings | | |
| Season | Age | Overall | Distance | Sprint | Nordic Opening | Tour de Ski | World Cup Final |
|---|---|---|---|---|---|---|---|
| 2003 | 22 | NC | —N/a | — | —N/a | —N/a | —N/a |
| 2004 | 23 | NC | NC | NC | —N/a | —N/a | —N/a |
| 2005 | 24 | 60 | NC | 37 | —N/a | —N/a | —N/a |
| 2006 | 25 | 77 | NC | 47 | —N/a | —N/a | —N/a |
| 2007 | 26 | 89 | NC | 53 | —N/a | DNF | —N/a |
| 2008 | 27 | 80 | NC | 58 | —N/a | — | — |
| 2009 | 28 | NC | — | NC | —N/a | — | — |
| 2010 | 29 | 89 | 92 | 66 | —N/a | 31 | — |
| 2011 | 30 | 61 | 58 | 80 | — | 25 | — |
| 2012 | 31 | NC | — | NC | — | — | — |
