= Triin Ojaste =

Estonian cross-country skier (born 1990)

Personal information
- Nationality: Estonia
- Born: March 14, 1990 (age 36) Rakvere, then part of Estonian SSR, Soviet Union

Sport
- Sport: Skiing
- Club: Karupesa Team

World Cup career
- Seasons: 8 – (2009–2015, 2017)
- Indiv. starts: 43
- Indiv. podiums: 0
- Team starts: 3
- Team podiums: 0
- Overall titles: 0 – (88th in 2012)
- Discipline titles: 0

Triin Ojaste (born 14 March 1990) is an Estonian cross-country skier who has competed since 2007. At the 2010 Winter Olympics in Vancouver, she finished 16th in the team sprint and 37th in the individual sprint event. She also represented Estonia at the 2014 Winter Olympics.

Ojaste finished 16th in the 4 × 5 km relay and 37th in the individual sprint event at the FIS Nordic World Ski Championships 2009 in Liberec. Her best World Cup finish was 15th in a team sprint event at Germany in 2009 while her best individual finish was 23rd in an individual sprint event at Germany in 2009.

Her father and trainer is biathlete Kalju Ojaste.

== Cross-country skiing results ==
All results are sourced from the International Ski Federation (FIS).

=== Olympic Games ===
Year	Age	10 km individual	15 km skiathlon	30 km mass start	Sprint	4 × 5 km relay	Team sprint
2010	19	—	—	—	37	—	15
2014	23	43	—	—	47	—	—

=== World Championships ===
Year	Age	10 km individual	15 km skiathlon	30 km mass start	Sprint	4 × 5 km relay	Team sprint
2009	18	—	—	—	36	14	—
2011	20	48	—	—	34	—	11
2013	22	—	—	—	25	13	15
2015	24	—	—	—	—	13	—

=== World Cup ===
==== Season standings ====
Season	Age	Discipline standings			Ski Tour standings		
Season	Age	Overall	Distance	Sprint	Nordic Opening	Tour de Ski	World Cup Final
2009	18	NC	NC	NC	—N/a	—	DNF
2010	19	109	—	77	—N/a	—	—
2011	20	124	NC	87	DNF	—	—
2012	21	88	NC	59	DNF	DNF	—
2013	22	NC	NC	NC	DNF	—	—
2014	23	NC	NC	NC	DNF	—	—
2015	24	NC	—	NC	—	—	—N/a
2017	26	NC	—	NC	—	—	—
