= Silvana Bucher =

Swiss cross-country skier

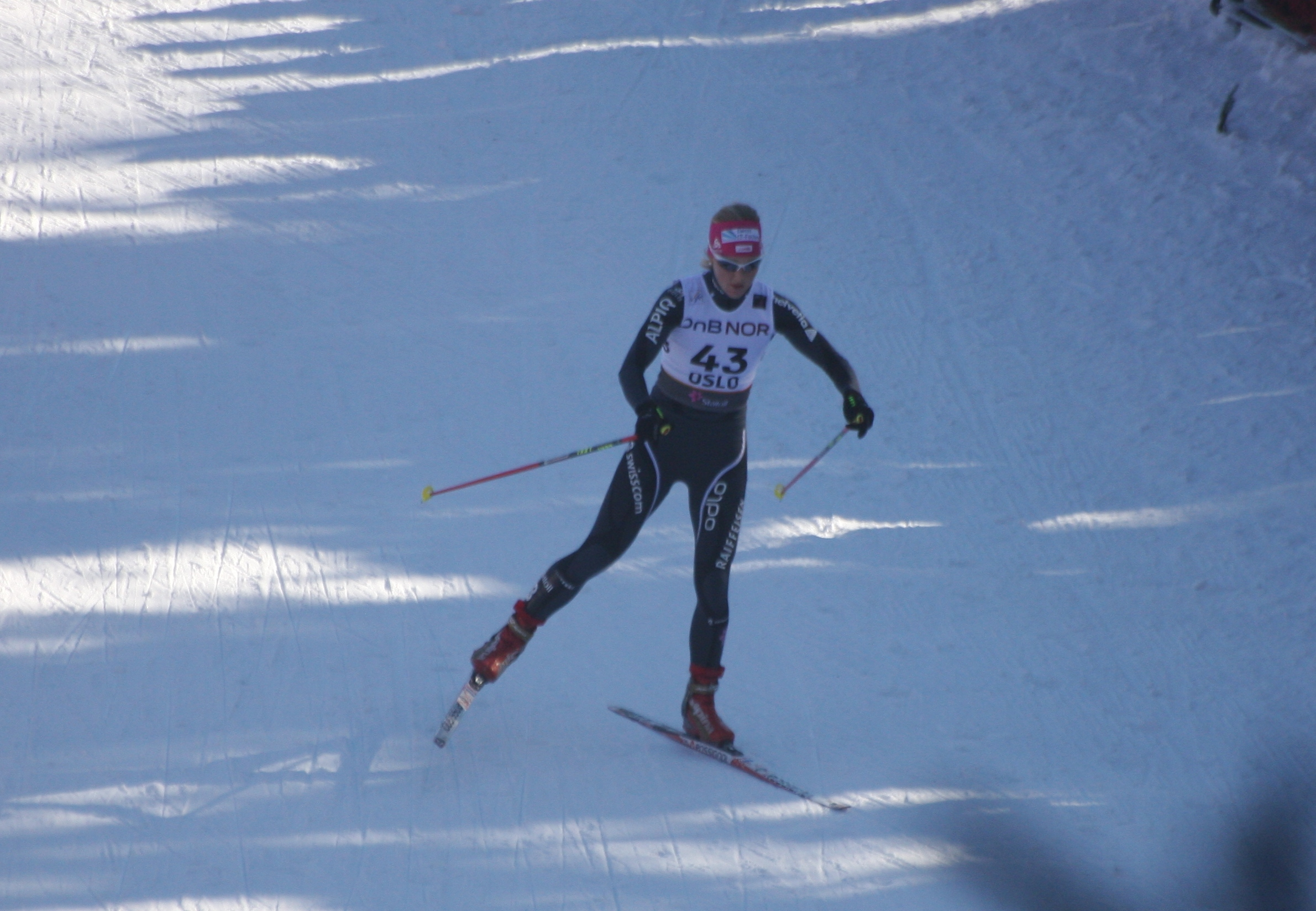

Personal information
- Nationality: Switzerland
- Born: February 3, 1984 (age 42) Malters, Switzerland

Sport
- Sport: Skiing
- Club: SC Entlebuch

World Cup career
- Seasons: 7 – (2006–2012)
- Indiv. starts: 28
- Indiv. podiums: 0
- Team starts: 12
- Team podiums: 0
- Overall titles: 0 – (65th in 2008, 2010)
- Discipline titles: 0
Medal record
Women's cross-country skiing
Representing Switzerland
U23 World Championships
Gold medal – first place	2007 Tarvisio	10 km freestyle

Silvana Bucher (born 3 February 1984) is a Swiss cross-country skier who has competed since 2001. At the 2010 Winter Olympics in Vancouver, she finished 18th in the team sprint event.

At the FIS Nordic World Ski Championships 2007 in Sapporo, Bucher finished ninth in the 4 × 5 km relay and 25th in the 10 km event.

Her best World Cup finish was fifth in the team sprint event at Russia in January 2010 while her best individual finish was also fifth in an individual sprint event at Norway in March 2010.

== Cross-country skiing results ==
All results are sourced from the International Ski Federation (FIS).

=== Olympic Games ===
Year	Age	10 km individual	15 km skiathlon	30 km mass start	Sprint	4 × 5 km relay	Team sprint
2010	26	—	—	—	—	—	17

=== World Championships ===
Year	Age	10 km individual	15 km skiathlon	30 km mass start	Sprint	4 × 5 km relay	Team sprint
2007	23	25	—	—	—	—	9
2011	27	—	—	19	22	—	—

=== World Cup ===
==== Season standings ====
Season	Age	Discipline standings			Ski Tour standings		
Season	Age	Overall	Distance	Sprint	Nordic Opening	Tour de Ski	World Cup Final
2006	22	NC	NC	—	—N/a	—N/a	—N/a
2007	23	117	91	NC	—N/a	—	—N/a
2008	24	65	50	52	—N/a	—	30
2009	25	NC	—	NC	—N/a	—	—
2010	26	65	58	48	—N/a	DNF	—
2011	27	73	63	61	—	—	—
2012	28	NC	NC	NC	—	—	—
