= Ida Sargent (skier) =

American cross-country skier (born 1988)

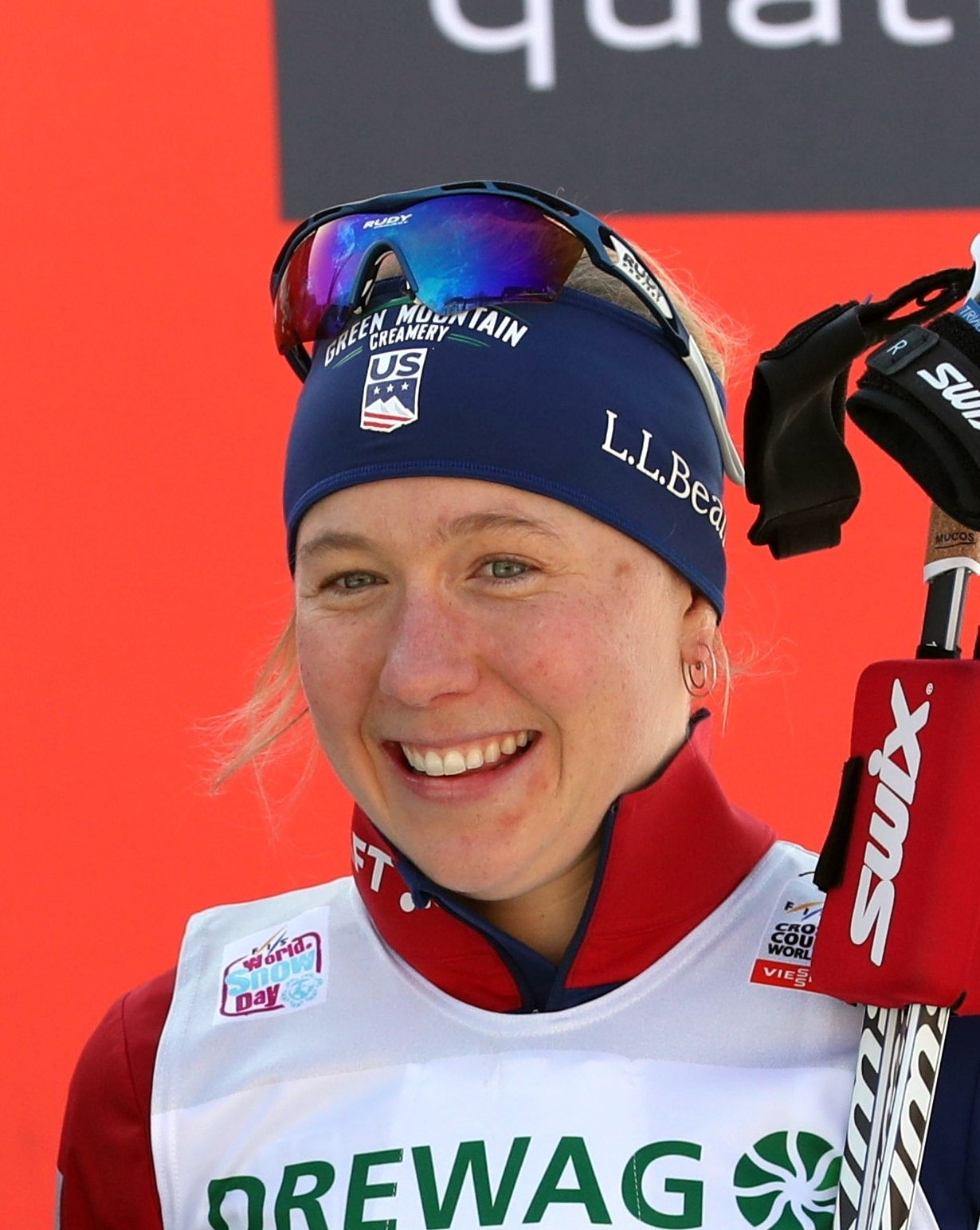
- Ida Sargent in Dresden, 2018

Personal information
- Nationality: United States
- Born: January 25, 1988 (age 38) Newport, Vermont, United States

Sport
- Sport: Skiing
- Club: Craftsbury Nordic Ski Club

World Cup career
- Seasons: 9 – (2011–2019)
- Indiv. starts: 148
- Indiv. podiums: 1
- Indiv. wins: 0
- Team starts: 17
- Team podiums: 2
- Team wins: 0
- Overall titles: 0 – (39th in 2013)
- Discipline titles: 0

Ida Sargent (born January 25, 1988) is an American cross-country skier. Sargent competed at the 2014 Winter Olympics in Sochi, Russia. Sargent attended Burke Mountain Academy in Vermont before competing collegiately at Dartmouth College, where she studied biology and psychology.

== Cross-country skiing results ==
All results are sourced from the International Ski Federation (FIS).

=== Olympic Games ===
Year	Age	10 km individual	15 km skiathlon	30 km mass start	Sprint	4 × 5 km relay	Team sprint
2014	24	32	—	—	19	—	—
2018	28	—	—	—	33	—	—

=== World Championships ===
Year	Age	10 km individual	15 km skiathlon	30 km mass start	Sprint	4 × 5 km relay	Team sprint
2011	23	51	—	—	45	—	9
2013	25	—	38	25	33	—	—
2015	27	—	—	—	29	—	—
2017	29	43	—	—	24	—	—

=== World Cup ===
==== Season standings ====
Season	Age	Discipline standings			Ski Tour standings			
Season	Age	Overall	Distance	Sprint	Nordic Opening	Tour de Ski	World Cup Final	Ski Tour Canada
2011	23	NC	NC	NC	DNF	—	—	—N/a
2012	24	71	72	49	38	—	—	—N/a
2013	25	39	53	22	18	—	37	—N/a
2014	26	49	48	33	38	—	38	—N/a
2015	27	57	NC	26	DNF	DNF	—N/a	—N/a
2016	28	43	NC	23	44	DNF	—N/a	34
2017	29	44	NC	17	57	—	DNF	—N/a
2018	30	56	67	23	38	DNF	57	—N/a
2019	31	76	NC	40	DNF	—	48	—N/a

==== Individual podiums ====
- 1 podium – (1 WC)

No.	Season	Date	Location	Race	Level	Place
1	2016–17	3 February 2017	Pyeongchang, South Korea	1.4 km Sprint C	World Cup	3rd

==== Team podiums ====
- 2 podiums – (2 TS)

No.	Season	Date	Location	Race	Level	Place	Teammate
1	2016–17	5 February 2017	Pyeongchang, South Korea	6 × 1.4 km Team Sprint F	World Cup	3rd	Caldwell
2	2017–18	14 January 2018	Dresden, Germany	6 × 1.3 km Team Sprint F	World Cup	3rd	Caldwell
