= Lucia Joas =

German cross-country skier (born 1991)

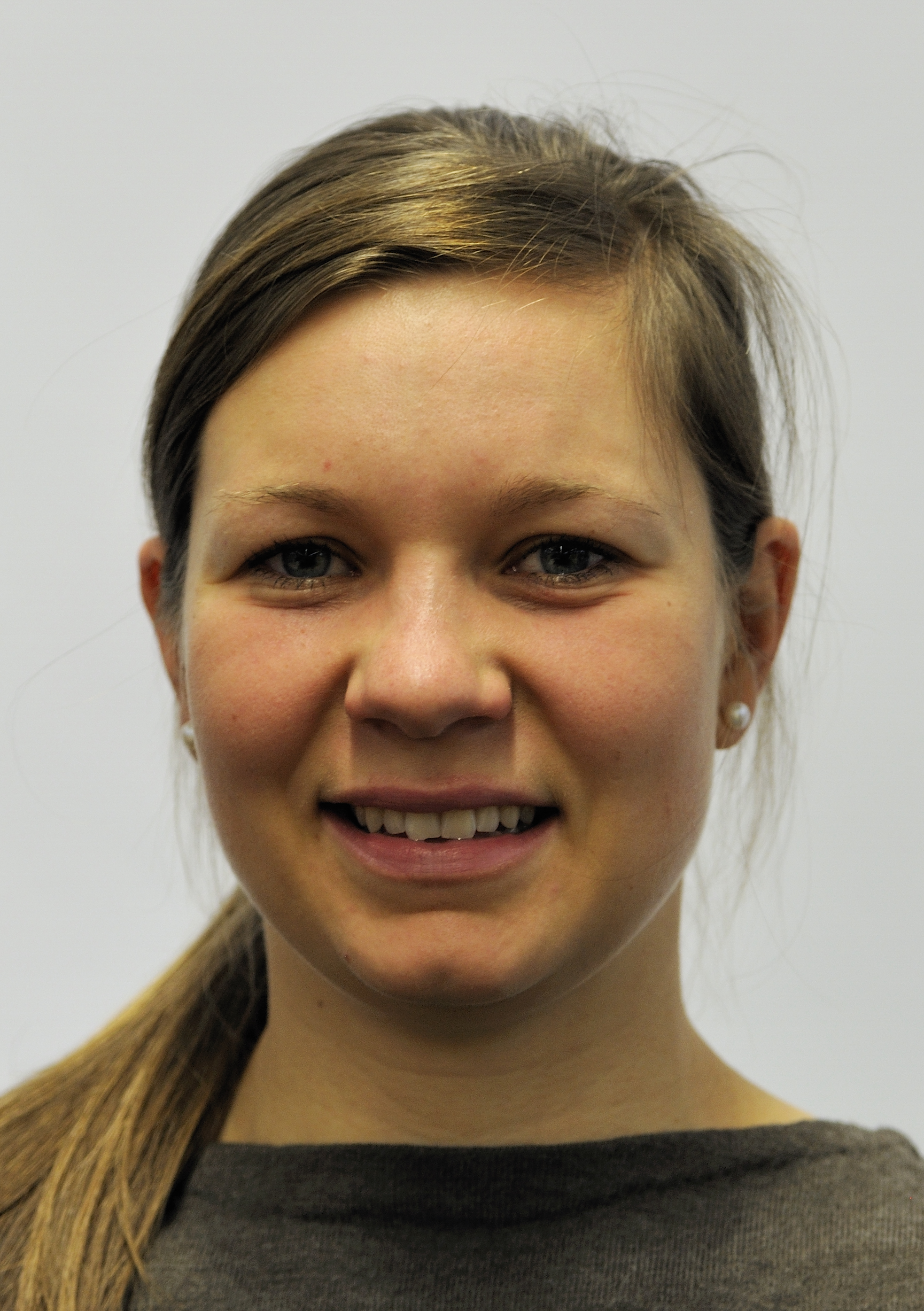
- Lucia Anger (2014)

Personal information
- Nationality: Germany
- Born: 26 January 1991 (age 35) Oberstdorf, Germany

Sport
- Sport: Skiing
- Club: SC Oberstdorf

World Cup career
- Seasons: 7 – (2010–2016)
- Indiv. starts: 43
- Indiv. podiums: 0
- Team starts: 6
- Team podiums: 0
- Overall titles: 0 – (46th in 2016)
- Discipline titles: 0
Medal record
Women's cross-country skiing
Representing Germany
Junior World Championships
Gold medal – first place	2011 Otepää	Individual sprint
Bronze medal – third place	2008 Mals	Individual sprint
Bronze medal – third place	2008 Mals	5 km classical
Bronze medal – third place	2009 Praz de Lys-Sommand	4 × 3.33 km relay
Bronze medal – third place	2011 Otepää	4 × 3.33 km relay

Lucia Joas (née Anger; born 26 January 1991 in Oberstdorf) is a German cross-country skier.

Joas competed at the 2014 Winter Olympics for Germany. She placed 31st in the qualifying round in the sprint, failing to advance to the knockout stages.

As of April 2014, her best showing at the World Championships is 42nd, in the classical 10 kilometres in 2011.

Joas made her World Cup debut in November 2009. As of April 2014, her best finish is sixth, in a freestyle sprint race at Oberhof in the 2013–14. Her best World Cup overall finish is 60th, in 2013–14. Her best World Cup finish in a discipline is 34th, in the sprint in 2013–14.

== Cross-country skiing results ==
All results are sourced from the International Ski Federation (FIS).

=== Olympic Games ===
Year	Age	10 km individual	15 km skiathlon	30 km mass start	Sprint	4 × 5 km relay	Team sprint
2014	23	—	—	—	30	—	—

=== World Championships ===
Year	Age	10 km individual	15 km skiathlon	30 km mass start	Sprint	4 × 5 km relay	Team sprint
2011	20	42	—	—	43	—	—

=== World Cup ===
==== Season standings ====
Season	Age	Discipline standings			Ski Tour standings			
Season	Age	Overall	Distance	Sprint	Nordic Opening	Tour de Ski	World Cup Final	Ski Tour Canada
2010	19	NC	—	NC	—N/a	—	—	—N/a
2011	20	84	NC	63	—	DNF	—	—N/a
2012	21	114	NC	79	—	DNF	—	—N/a
2013	22	NC	NC	—	—	DNF	—	—N/a
2014	23	60	79	34	—	DNF	—	—N/a
2015	24	96	NC	53	—	DNF	—N/a	—N/a
2016	25	46	71	27	—	DNF	—N/a	DNF
