= Aurore Jean =

French cross-country skier (born 1985)

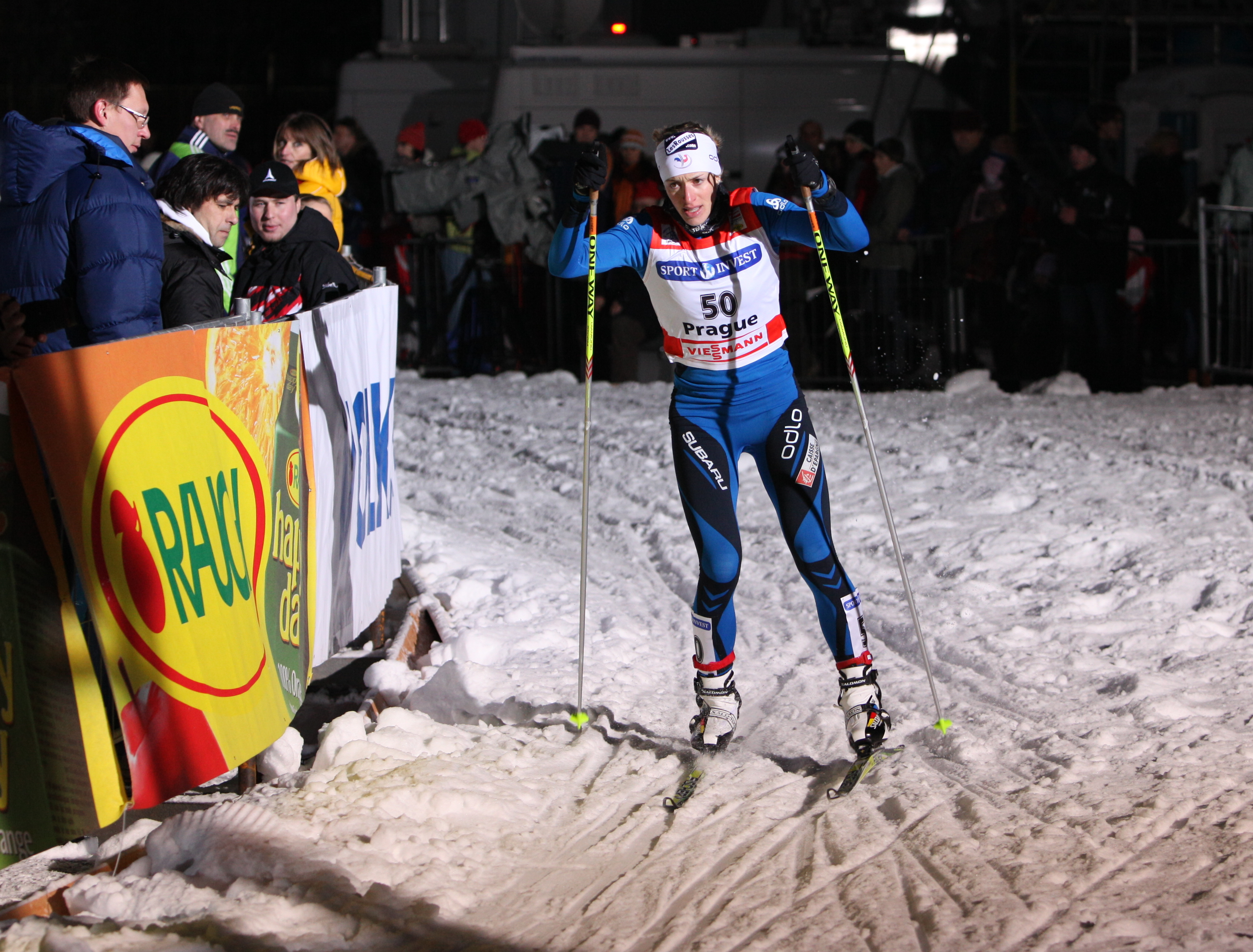
- Aurore Jean in 2010

Personal information
- Nationality: France
- Born: June 27, 1985 (age 41) Besançon, France

Sport
- Sport: Skiing
- Club: SC Grandvaux / Douanes / Skieurs Rousselands

World Cup career
- Seasons: 10 – (2007–2015, 2018)
- Indiv. starts: 168
- Indiv. podiums: 1
- Indiv. wins: 0
- Team starts: 20
- Team podiums: 0
- Overall titles: 0 – (16th in 2013)
- Discipline titles: 0
Medal record
Women's cross-country skiing
Representing France
U23 World Championships
Silver medal – second place	2008 Mals	10 km classical

Aurore Jean (French pronunciation: [o.ʁɔʁ ʒɑ̃]; née Cuinet; born 25 June 1985 in Besançon) is a former French cross-country skier who has competed internationally from 2005 to 2018. At the 2010 Winter Olympics in Vancouver, she finished sixth in the 4 × 5 km relay, 15th in the 30 km, 24th in the individual sprint, 32nd in the 7.5 km + 7.5 km double pursuit event, and 47th in the 10 km event.

At the FIS Nordic World Ski Championships 2009 in Liberec, Aurore Cuinet finished 12th in the team sprint while not finishing the 10 km event.

Her best World Cup finish was seventh at a team sprint event in Canada in 2009 while her best individual finish was 28th at a 15 km mass start event in Slovenia also in 2009.

== Cross-country skiing results ==
All results are sourced from the International Ski Federation (FIS).

=== Olympic Games ===
Year	Age	10 km individual	15 km skiathlon	30 km mass start	Sprint	4 × 5 km relay	Team sprint
2010	24	46	32	14	24	6	—
2014	28	27	17	6	12	4	11
2018	32	22	23	—	46	12	8

=== World Championships ===
Year	Age	10 km individual	15 km skiathlon	30 km mass start	Sprint	4 × 5 km relay	Team sprint
2009	23	DNF	—	—	25	—	12
2011	25	—	39	DNF	31	13	—
2013	27	21	13	—	22	6	—
2015	29	—	—	—	—	8	—

=== World Cup ===
==== Season standings ====
Season	Age	Discipline standings			Ski Tour standings		
Season	Age	Overall	Distance	Sprint	Nordic Opening	Tour de Ski	World Cup Final
2007	21	NC	NC	—	—N/a	—	—N/a
2008	22	100	NC	78	—N/a	—	DNF
2009	23	71	NC	50	—N/a	—	—
2010	24	57	72	30	—N/a	DNF	—
2011	25	46	34	59	39	23	—
2012	26	38	50	22	56	31	40
2013	27	16	29	9	60	20	11
2014	28	28	28	37	35	15	29
2015	29	73	60	62	27	DNF	—N/a
2018	32	71	57	59	—	DNF	—

==== Individual podiums ====
- 1 podium – (1 WC)

No.	Season	Date	Location	Race	Level	Place
1	2012–13	1 February 2013	Sochi, Russia	1.25 km Sprint F	World Cup	2nd
