= Holly Brooks =

American cross-country skier

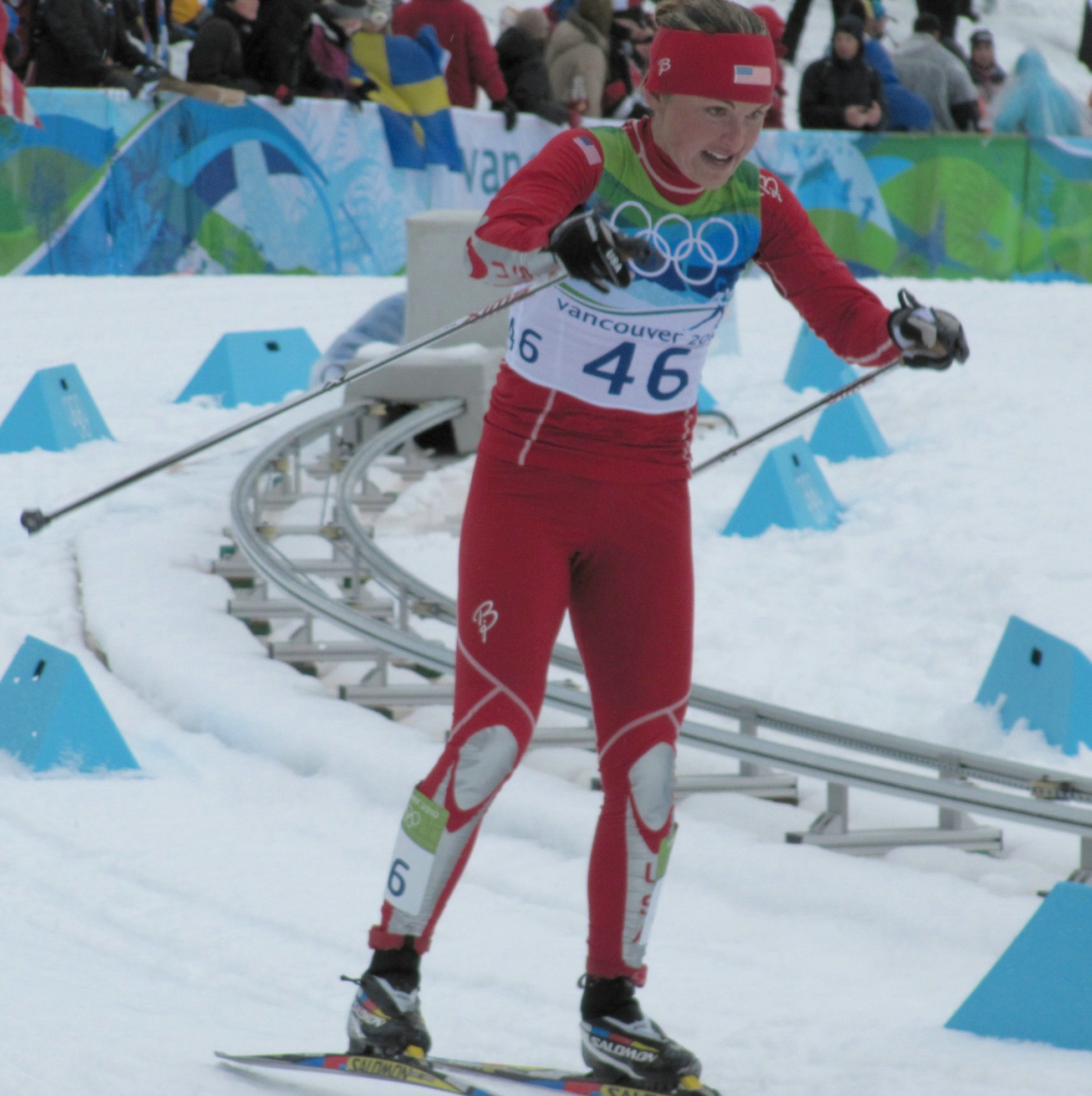

Personal information
- Full name: Holly Anne Syrjala Brooks
- Nationality: United States
- Born: April 17, 1982 (age 44) Seattle, Washington, United States
- Height: 1.69 m (5 ft 7 in)

Sport
- Sport: Skiing
- Club: APU Ski Team

World Cup career
- Seasons: 5 – (2010–2014)
- Indiv. starts: 74
- Indiv. podiums: 0
- Team podiums: 1
- Team wins: 0
- Overall titles: 0 – (35th in 2013)
- Discipline titles: 0

Holly Brooks (born April 17, 1982) is an American cross-country skier from Seattle, Washington who competed for Whitman College in 2001–04 and has competed recreationally since 2009. She has four victories in lesser events up to 10 km, all earned in 2009. She was a late qualifier to the 2010 Winter Olympics in Vancouver, her second ever international skiing competition following the 2010 World Cup in Canmore. She went on to qualify for the World Championship team in 2011 and the 2014 Olympic Games in Sochi. Brooks retired from world-class ski racing after the 2015-2016 season.

== Personal life ==
Born and raised in Seattle, Washington, Brooks began skiing as a young girl, primarily at Snoqualmie Pass where her family owned a cabin and she took lessons through the Junior Nordic Program. She competed in Nordic skiing events in high school and college, but never raced at NCAA's. She currently is a full-time coach at Alaska Pacific University, where she coaches juniors, masters and women's only ski groups. Brooks has three siblings who are triplets. Brooks is married to Anchorage firefighter Robert Whitney. She currently resides full-time in Anchorage. Brooks won the 2012 and 2014 Women's Mount Marathon in Seward, Alaska. In 2014, she won with a time of 52 minutes, 48.16 seconds, less than three seconds ahead of defending champion Marvin, a Palmer woman who clocked 52:50.51.

== Vancouver 2010 Olympics ==
It was announced on 26 January 2010 that Brooks had qualified for the 2010 Winter Olympics. She competed in five events. Her best finish was 12th in the 4 × 5 km relay, and her best individual finish was 36th in the 30 km event. Her entrance to the Olympics came as a surprise as she was not a full-time athlete, and had only recently begun to think about skiing at an elite level.

== Sochi 2014 Olympics ==
On 22 January 2014, Brooks was selected to represent the United States at the 2014 Winter Olympics.

== Cross-country skiing results ==
All results are sourced from the International Ski Federation (FIS).

=== Olympic Games ===
Year	Age	10 km individual	15 km skiathlon	30 km mass start	Sprint	4 × 5 km relay	Team sprint
2010	27	41	55	35	38	11	—
2014	31	33	46	27	—	—	—

=== World Championships ===
Year	Age	10 km individual	15 km skiathlon	30 km mass start	Sprint	4 × 5 km relay	Team sprint
2011	28	27	25	25	—	9	—
2013	30	27	49	—	—	—	—

=== World Cup ===
==== Season standings ====
Season	Age	Discipline standings			Ski Tour standings		
Season	Age	Overall	Distance	Sprint	Nordic Opening	Tour de Ski	World Cup Final
2010	27	107	90	88	—N/a	—	—
2011	28	NC	NC	NC	—	—	33
2012	29	55	45	60	23	39	—
2013	30	35	37	43	22	38	27
2014	31	84	56	76	34	DNF	—

==== Team podiums ====
- 1 podium – (1 RL)

No.	Season	Date	Location	Race	Level	Place	Teammates
1	2012–13	25 November 2012	Gällivare, Sweden	4 × 5 km Relay C/F	World Cup	3rd	Randall / Stephen / Diggins
