= Alenka Čebašek =

Slovenian cross-country skier

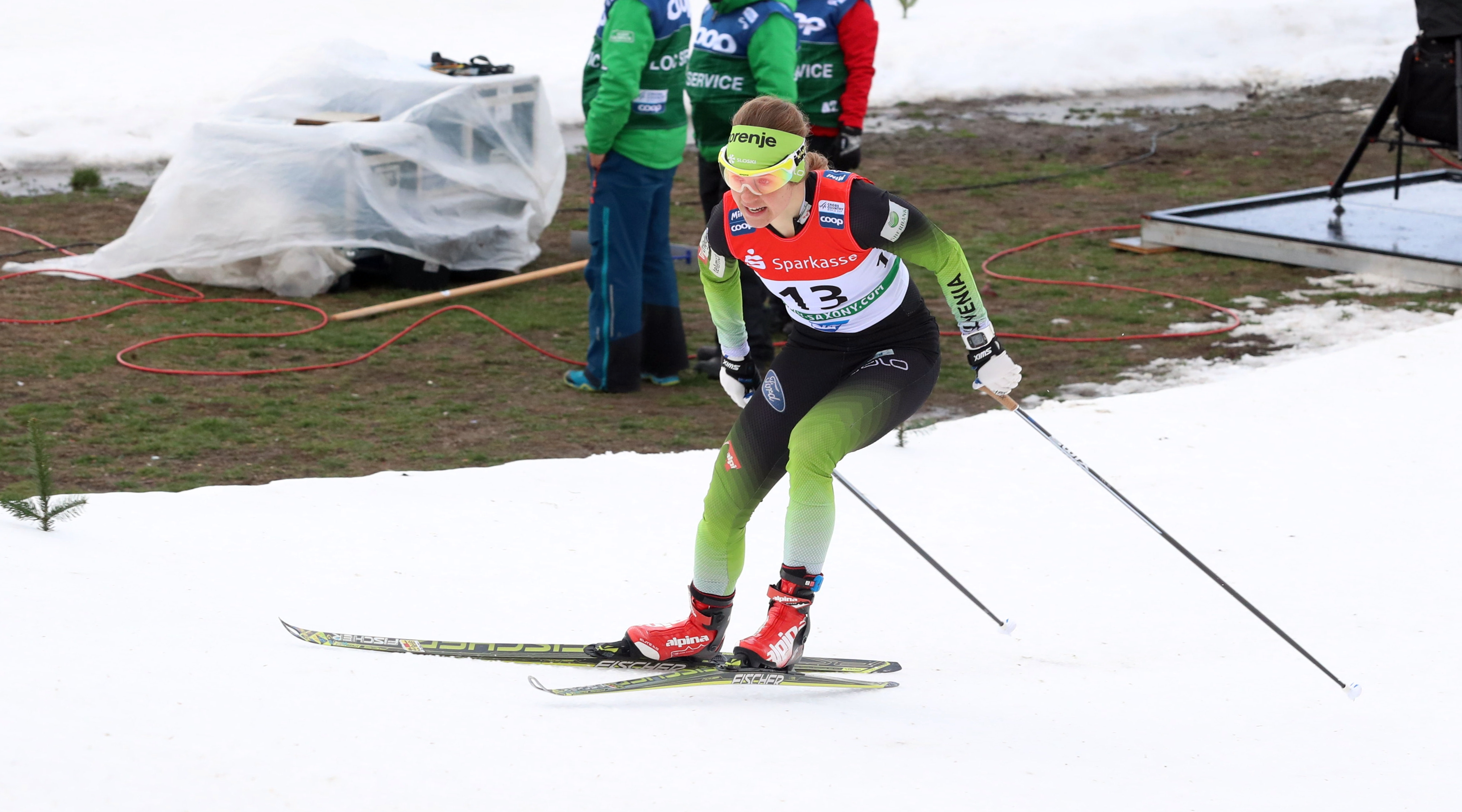
- Čebašek in Dresden, 2019

Personal information
- Nationality: Slovenia
- Born: 24 April 1989 (age 37) Kranj, SR Slovenia, SFR Yugoslavia
- Height: 1.66 m (5 ft 5 in)

Sport
- Sport: Skiing
- Club: TSK Bled

World Cup career
- Seasons: 11 – (2010–2020)
- Indiv. starts: 154
- Indiv. podiums: 0
- Team starts: 14
- Team podiums: 0
- Overall titles: 0 – (34th in 2019)
- Discipline titles: 0
- Updated on 8 December 2021

Alenka Čebašek (born 24 April 1989) is a Slovenian cross-country skier. She competed at the 2014 Winter Olympics in Sochi.

== Cross-country skiing results ==
All results are sourced from the International Ski Federation (FIS).

=== Olympic Games ===
Year	Age	10 km individual	15 km skiathlon	30 km mass start	Sprint	4 × 5 km relay	Team sprint
2014	24	31	—	—	17	10	9
2018	28	12	—	—	30	8	6

=== World Championships ===
Year	Age	10 km individual	15 km skiathlon	30 km mass start	Sprint	4 × 5 km relay	Team sprint
2011	21	46	—	—	19	—	—
2013	23	42	—	—	37	14	—
2017	27	DNF	39	—	18	13	—
2019	29	—	36	—	27	9	—

=== World Cup ===
==== Season standings ====
Season	Age	Discipline standings			Ski Tour standings				
Season	Age	Overall	Distance	Sprint	Nordic Opening	Tour de Ski	Ski Tour 2020	World Cup Final	Ski Tour Canada
2010	20	NC	NC	NC	—N/a	—	—N/a	—	—N/a
2011	21	83	—	57	—	—	—N/a	—	—N/a
2012	22	58	NC	34	—	DNF	—N/a	—	—N/a
2013	23	90	76	60	63	DNF	—N/a	—	—N/a
2014	24	55	50	41	31	DNF	—N/a	—	—N/a
2015	25	44	40	31	24	DNF	—N/a	—N/a	—N/a
2016	26	37	33	29	39	DNF	—N/a	—N/a	30
2017	27	60	53	40	DNF	DNF	—N/a	—	—N/a
2018	28	62	NC	33	55	—	—N/a	51	—N/a
2019	29	34	40	30	35	21	—N/a	—	—N/a
2020	30	93	NC	64	—	—	—	—N/a	—N/a
