= Paulina Maciuszek =

Polish cross-country skier

Personal information
- Nationality: Poland
- Born: September 2, 1985 (age 40) Rabka-Zdrój, Polish People's Republic

Sport
- Sport: Skiing
- Club: LKS Poroniec Poronin

World Cup career
- Seasons: 8 – (2008–2015)
- Indiv. starts: 73
- Indiv. podiums: 0
- Team starts: 9
- Team podiums: 0
- Overall titles: 0 – (61st in 2014)
- Discipline titles: 0

Paulina Maciuszek (born 2 September 1985 in Rabka-Zdrój) is a Polish cross-country skier who has been competing since 2004. At the 2010 Winter Olympics in Vancouver, she finished sixth in the 4 × 5 km relay, 29th in the 30 km, 45th in the 10 km, and 52nd in the 7.5 km + 7.5 km double pursuit events.

At the FIS Nordic World Ski Championships 2009 in Liberec, Maciuszek finished sixth in the 4 × 5 km relay, 50th in the 30 km, 58th in the 7.5 km + 7.5 km double pursuit, and 61st in the 10 km events.

Her best career finish was ninth in a 4 × 5 km relay in France in 2008 while her best individual finish was 34th at a 10 km event in Estonia in January 2010.

== Cross-country skiing results ==
All results are sourced from the International Ski Federation (FIS).

=== Olympic Games ===
Year	Age	10 km individual	15 km skiathlon	30 km mass start	Sprint	4 × 5 km relay	Team sprint
2010	24	44	51	28	—	DSQ	—
2014	28	37	28	39	—	6	—

=== World Championships ===
Year	Age	10 km individual	15 km skiathlon	30 km mass start	Sprint	4 × 5 km relay	Team sprint
2009	23	61	57	49	—	6	—
2011	25	47	32	43	52	8	—
2013	27	34	28	—	56	9	—

=== World Cup ===
==== Season standings ====
Season	Age	Discipline standings			Ski Tour standings		
Season	Age	Overall	Distance	Sprint	Nordic Opening	Tour de Ski	World Cup Final
2008	22	NC	NC	—	—N/a	—	57
2009	23	NC	NC	NC	—N/a	—	—
2010	24	NC	NC	NC	—N/a	—	—
2011	25	64	55	NC	44	26	—
2012	26	NC	NC	NC	DNF	DNF	—
2013	27	109	78	NC	54	40	—
2014	28	61	49	NC	44	21	—
2015	29	NC	NC	NC	61	—	—N/a
