= Brittany Webster =

Canadian cross-country skier

Personal information
- Nationality: Canada
- Born: 25 June 1987 (age 39) Toronto, Ontario, Canada
- Height: 168 cm (5 ft 6 in)
- Weight: 57 kg (126 lb)

Sport
- Sport: Skiing
- Club: Highlands Nordic

World Cup career
- Seasons: 3 – (2009–2010, 2013)
- Indiv. starts: 4
- Indiv. podiums: 0
- Team starts: 1
- Team podiums: 0
- Overall titles: 0 – (88th in 2009)
- Discipline titles: 0

Brittany Webster (born 25 June 1987) is a Canadian cross-country skier.

She competed at the 2010 Winter Olympics in Vancouver, and has been named to the Canadian team for the 2014 Winter Olympics in Sochi.

Webster attended Mayfield Secondary School.

== Cross-country skiing results ==
All results are sourced from the International Ski Federation (FIS).

=== Olympic Games ===
Year	Age	10 km individual	15 km skiathlon	30 km mass start	Sprint	4 × 5 km relay	Team sprint
2014	26	40	50	44	—	13	—

=== World Championships ===
Year	Age	10 km individual	15 km skiathlon	30 km mass start	Sprint	4 × 5 km relay	Team sprint
2013	25	68	57	—	—	DNF	—

=== World Cup ===
==== Season standings ====
Season	Age	Discipline standings			Ski Tour standings		
Season	Age	Overall	Distance	Sprint	Nordic Opening	Tour de Ski	World Cup Final
2009	21	88	61	NC	—N/a	—	—
2010	22	NC	NC	—	—N/a	—	—
2013	25	NC	NC	—	—	—	—
