= Marina Piller =

Italian cross-country skier

Personal information
- Nationality: Italy
- Born: 17 November 1984 (age 41) Tolmezzo, Italy

Sport
- Sport: Skiing
- Club: G.S. Forestale

World Cup career
- Seasons: 7 – (2006–2008, 2012–2015)
- Indiv. starts: 47
- Indiv. podiums: 0
- Team starts: 6
- Team podiums: 0
- Overall titles: 0 – (66th in 2015)
- Discipline titles: 0
Medal record
Women's cross-country skiing
Representing Italy
U23 World Championships
Bronze medal – third place	2007 Tarvisio	10 km freestyle

Marina Piller (born 17 November 1984) is an Italian cross-country skier who has competed between 2006 and 2015. Her best World Cup finish was second twice (team sprint: 2009, 4 × 5 km relay: March 2010). Piller's best individual finish was fourth in a sprint event in China in 2007.

She has competed at the 2014 Winter Olympics, her best finish was 16th in the skiathlon event. In 2018, she was disqualified for doping retroactively, all her 2014 Olympic results were annulled.

== Cross-country skiing results ==
All results are sourced from the International Ski Federation (FIS).

=== Olympic Games ===
Year	Age	10 km individual	15 km skiathlon	30 km mass start	Sprint	4 × 5 km relay	Team sprint
2014	29	DQ	DQ	DQ	—	DQ	—

=== World Championships ===
Year	Age	10 km individual	15 km skiathlon	30 km mass start	Sprint	4 × 5 km relay	Team sprint
2013	28	20	—	—	—	8	5
2015	30	13	40	—	—	9	—

=== World Cup ===
==== Season standings ====
Season	Age	Discipline standings			Ski Tour standings		
Season	Age	Overall	Distance	Sprint	Nordic Opening	Tour de Ski	World Cup Final
2006	21	NC	NC	—	—N/a	—N/a	—N/a
2007	22	NC	NC	—	—N/a	—	—N/a
2008	23	94	62	NC	—N/a	—	—
2012	27	NC	NC	NC	DNF	DNF	—
2013	28	66	45	NC	DNF	42	—
2014	29	95	63	NC	DNF	DNF	—
2015	30	113	84	NC	DNF	—	—N/a
