= Laure Barthélémy =

French cross-country skier (born 1988)

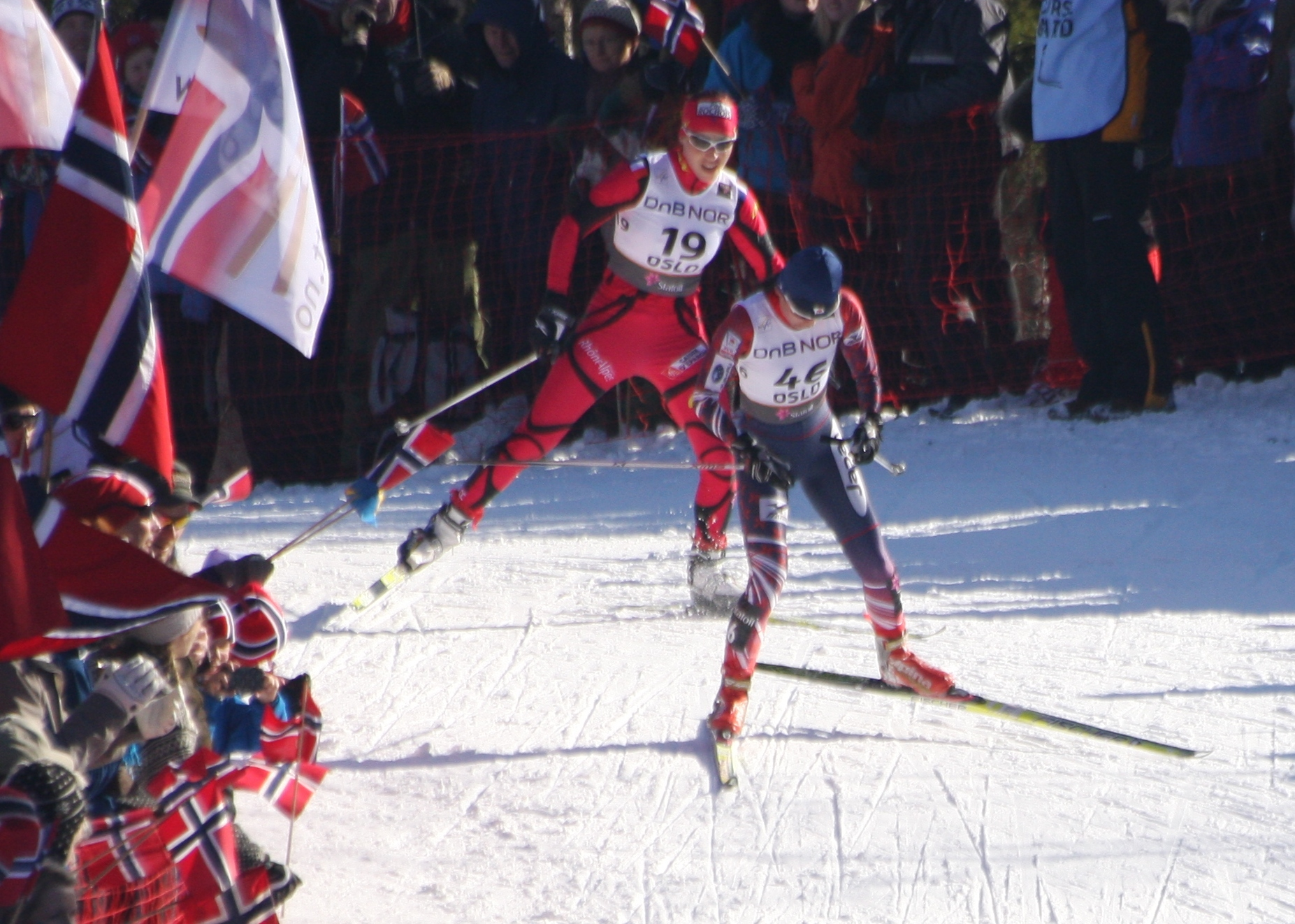
- Laure Barthélémy in 2011

Personal information
- Nationality: France
- Born: August 5, 1988 (age 38) Briançon, Hautes-Alpes, France

Sport
- Sport: Skiing
- Club: SC Nordique Pays Rochois

World Cup career
- Seasons: 6 – (2007–2012)
- Indiv. starts: 84
- Indiv. podiums: 0
- Team starts: 12
- Team podiums: 0
- Overall titles: 0 – (23rd in 2011)
- Discipline titles: 0
Medal record
Women's cross-country skiing
Representing France
Junior World Championships
| Gold medal – first place | 2008 Mals | Individual sprint |
| Silver medal – second place | 2008 Mals | 10 km freestyle |

Laure Barthélémy (born August 5, 1988, in Briançon, Hautes-Alpes) is a French cross-country skier and soldier who has competed since 2005.

Barthélémy also competed in one Winter Olympics, earning her best finish of fifth in the team sprint event with Karine Laurent Philippot at Vancouver in 2010. She also finished first in the sprint event at the Junior World Ski Championships in Mals in 2008, and second in the 10 km event.

At the FIS Nordic World Ski Championships 2009 in Liberec, she finished 22nd in the individual sprint and 53rd in the 7.5 km + 7.5 km double pursuit. Barthélémy's best World Cup finish was fifth in a team sprint event in Canada in 2009.

== Cross-country skiing results ==
All results are sourced from the International Ski Federation (FIS).

=== Olympic Games ===
| Year | Age | 10 km individual | 15 km skiathlon | 30 km mass start | Sprint | 4 × 5 km relay | Team sprint |
|---|---|---|---|---|---|---|---|
| 2010 | 21 | 61 | — | — | — | — | 9 |

=== World Championships ===
| Year | Age | 10 km individual | 15 km skiathlon | 30 km mass start | Sprint | 4 × 5 km relay | Team sprint |
|---|---|---|---|---|---|---|---|
| 2009 | 20 | — | 52 | — | 22 | — | — |
| 2011 | 22 | 23 | 38 | 35 | 7 | 13 | — |

=== World Cup ===
==== Season standings ====
| Season | Age | Discipline standings | | | Ski Tour standings | | |
| Season | Age | Overall | Distance | Sprint | Nordic Opening | Tour de Ski | World Cup Final |
|---|---|---|---|---|---|---|---|
| 2007 | 17 | NC | NC | — | —N/a | — | —N/a |
| 2008 | 18 | NC | NC | — | —N/a | — | 47 |
| 2009 | 19 | 70 | 63 | 61 | —N/a | — | 30 |
| 2010 | 20 | 83 | 63 | 75 | —N/a | DNF | — |
| 2011 | 22 | 23 | 25 | 20 | — | 20 | 17 |
| 2012 | 23 | 41 | 30 | 31 | 42 | 37 | 22 |
