= Daria Gaiazova =

Canadian cross-country skier

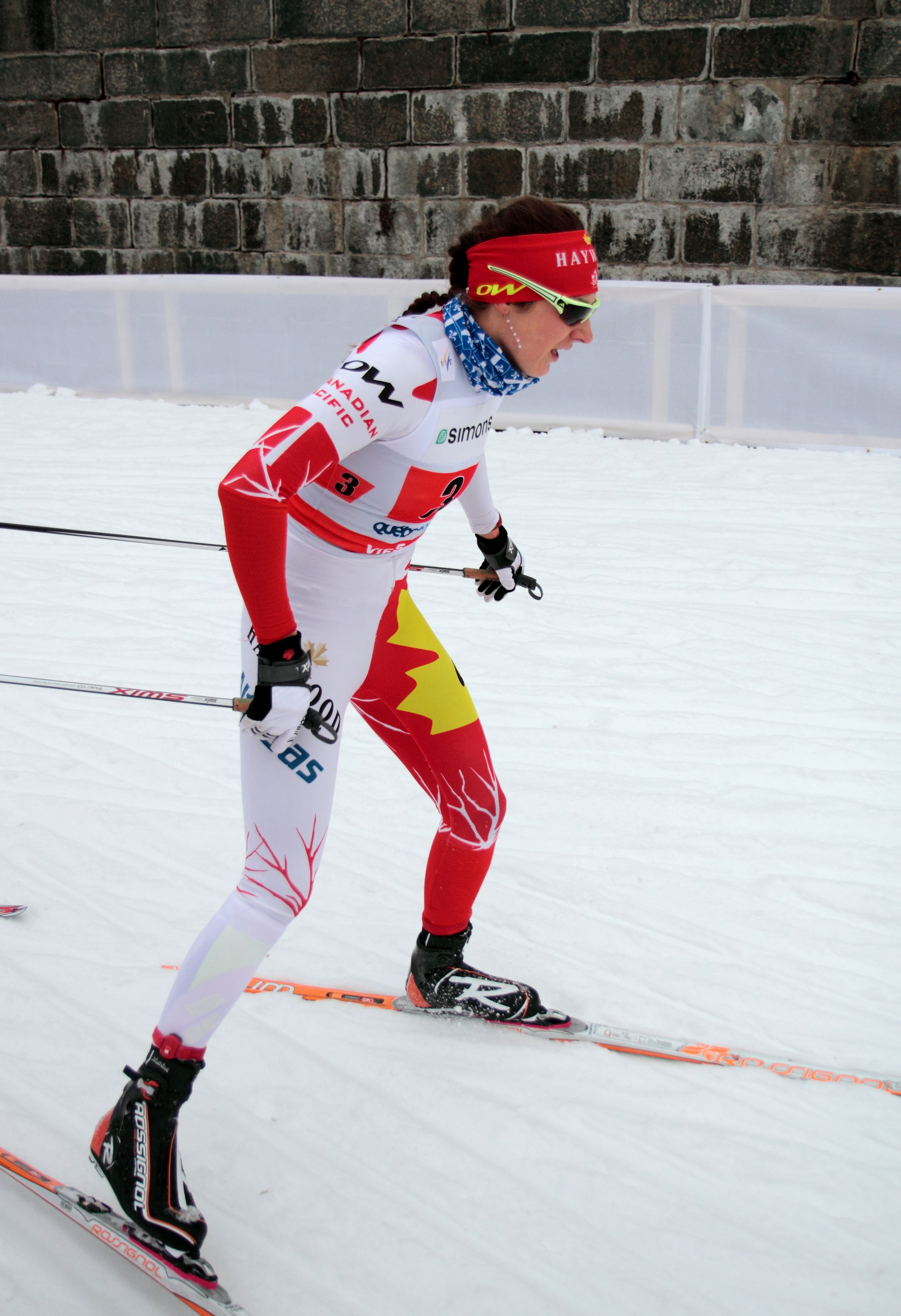

Personal information
- Nationality: Canada
- Born: 24 December 1983 (age 42) Pushchino, Soviet Union
- Height: 178 cm (5 ft 10 in)

Sport
- Sport: Skiing
- Club: Rocky Mountain Racers

World Cup career
- Seasons: 9 – (2006–2014)
- Indiv. starts: 94
- Indiv. podiums: 0
- Team starts: 11
- Team podiums: 2
- Team wins: 0
- Overall titles: 0 – (42nd in 2013)
- Discipline titles: 0
Medal record
Women's cross-country skiing
Representing Canada
U23 World Championships
Bronze medal – third place	2004 Park City	Team sprint

Daria Gaiazova (born 24 December 1983) is a Canadian cross-country skier.

She was born in Russia and moved with her family to Montreal in 1999. Competing since 2001, she finished seventh in the team sprint, 16th in the 4 x 5 km relay, 22nd in the individual sprint, and 42nd in the 7.5 km + 7.5 km double pursuit events. Gaiazova's best finish at the FIS Nordic World Ski Championships was 16th in the 4 x 5 km relay at Sapporo in 2007 while her best individual finish was 28th in the individual sprint event at Liberec two years later.

Her best World Cup finish was 12th on three occasions, all in sprint events, since 2005.

Gaiazova participated at four events in the 2010 Olympics (two individual and two team events), where her best result was the seventh place in the team sprint, together with Sara Renner.

== Cross-country skiing results ==
All results are sourced from the International Ski Federation (FIS).

=== Olympic Games ===
Year	Age	10 km individual	15 km skiathlon	30 km mass start	Sprint	4 × 5 km relay	Team sprint
2014	30	42	—	—	24	13	10

=== World Championships ===
Year	Age	10 km individual	15 km skiathlon	30 km mass start	Sprint	4 × 5 km relay	Team sprint
2007	23	47	46	40	52	16	—
2009	25	—	46	DNF	28	—	—
2011	27	37	—	—	20	14	6
2013	29	40	—	—	42	DNF	13

=== World Cup ===
==== Season standings ====
Season	Age	Discipline standings			Ski Tour standings		
Season	Age	Overall	Distance	Sprint	Nordic Opening	Tour de Ski	World Cup Final
2006	22	NC	NC	NC	—N/a	—N/a	—N/a
2007	23	NC	NC	NC	—N/a	DNF	—N/a
2008	24	NC	NC	NC	—N/a	—	—
2009	25	78	64	78	—N/a	—	51
2010	26	71	82	43	—N/a	—	41
2011	27	53	NC	31	48	—	—
2012	28	46	67	26	DNF	—	41
2013	29	42	82	17	DNF	—	DNF
2014	30	68	NC	40	DNF	—	DNF

==== Team podiums ====
- 2 podiums – (2 TS)

No.	Season	Date	Location	Race	Level	Place	Teammate
1	2010–11	5 December 2010	Düsseldorf, Germany	6 × 0.9 km Team Sprint F	World Cup	3rd	Crawford
2	2012–13	3 February 2013	Sochi, Russia	6 × 1.25 km Team Sprint C	World Cup	3rd	Jones
