= Marija Kolaroska =

Macedonian cross-country skier (born 1997)

Personal information
- Born: 21 September 1997 (age 28)
Medal record
Cross-country skiing
Representing North Macedonia

Marija Kolaroska (born 21 September 1997) is a cross-country skier competing for North Macedonia. She competed for Macedonia at the 2014 Winter Olympics in the 10 kilometre classical race.

== See also ==
- Macedonia at the 2014 Winter Olympics
