= Cross-country skiing at the 2014 Winter Olympics – Women's 10 kilometre classical =

Women's 10 kilometre classical at the XXII Olympic Winter Games
- Venue: Laura Biathlon & Ski Complex
- Dates: 13 February 2014
- Competitors: 76 from 40 nations
- Winning time: 28:17.8

Medalists
1st place, gold medalist(s)		Justyna Kowalczyk	Poland
2nd place, silver medalist(s)		Charlotte Kalla	Sweden
3rd place, bronze medalist(s)		Therese Johaug	Norway

The women's 10 kilometre classical cross-country skiing competition at the 2014 Sochi Olympics took place on 13 February at Laura Biathlon & Ski Complex. Justyna Kowalczyk of Poland won the race after taking a commanding lead early on, then never threatened. Swede Charlotte Kalla won her second silver medal of the 2014 Olympic Games, and Therese Johaug of Norway edged into third place to win the bronze medal.

== Qualification ==
An athlete with a maximum of 100 FIS distance points (the A standard) will be allowed to compete in both or one of the event (sprint/distance). An athlete with a maximum 120 FIS sprint points will be allowed to compete in the sprint event and 10 km for women or 15 km for men provided their distance points do not exceed 300 FIS points. NOC's who do not have any athlete meeting the A standard can enter one competitor of each sex (known as the basic quota) in only 10 km classical event for women or 15 km classical event for men. They must have a maximum of 300 FIS distance points at the end of qualifying on January 20, 2014. The qualification period began in July 2012.

== Results ==
The race was started at 14:00.

Rank	Bib	Name	Country	Time	Deficit
1st place, gold medalist(s)	43	Justyna Kowalczyk	Poland	28:17.8	—
2nd place, silver medalist(s)	40	Charlotte Kalla	Sweden	28:36.2	+18.4
3rd place, bronze medalist(s)	46	Therese Johaug	Norway	28:46.1	+28.3
4	37	Aino-Kaisa Saarinen	Finland	28:48.1	+30.3
5	45	Marit Bjørgen	Norway	28:51.2	+33.4
6	31	Stefanie Böhler	Germany	29:04.3	+46.5
7	20	Natalya Zhukova	Russia	29:15.5	+57.7
8	41	Kerttu Niskanen	Finland	29:16.7	+58.9
9	42	Heidi Weng	Norway	29:28.2	+1:10.4
10	39	Krista Lähteenmäki	Finland	29:36.0	+1:18.2
11	23	Emma Wikén	Sweden	29:38.9	+1:21.1
12	28	Olga Kuzyukova	Russia	29:41.9	+1:24.1
13	36	Anne Kyllönen	Finland	29:52.8	+1:35.0
14	35	Masako Ishida	Japan	29:55.7	+1:37.9
15	30	Sara Lindborg	Sweden	29:56.2	+1:38.4
16	26	Sadie Bjornsen	United States	29:59.7	+1:41.9
17	44	Astrid Uhrenholdt Jacobsen	Norway	30:01.6	+1:43.8
18	24	Anna Haag	Sweden	30:04.5	+1:46.7
19	34	Eva Vrabcová-Nývltová	Czech Republic	30:06.7	+1:48.9
20	27	Kateřina Smutná	Austria	30:13.6	+1:55.8
21	25	Nicole Fessel	Germany	30:27.0	+2:09.2
22	21	Valentyna Shevchenko	Ukraine	30:33.0	+2:15.2
23	33	Katrin Zeller	Germany	30:38.5	+2:20.7
24	53	Kornelia Kubińska	Poland	30:43.5	+2:25.7
25	19	Célia Aymonier	France	30:45.8	+2:28.0
26	14	Laura Orgué	Spain	30:48.0	+2:30.2
27	29	Aurore Jéan	France	31:01.0	+2:43.2
28	9	Tetyana Antypenko	Ukraine	31:06.9	+2:49.1
29	13	Sophie Caldwell	United States	31:11.4	+2:53.6
30	17	Alenka Čebašek	Slovenia	31:13.6	+2:55.8
31	50	Ida Sargent	United States	31:15.1	+2:57.3
32	18	Holly Brooks	United States	31:19.1	+3:01.3
33	5	Elena Kolomina	Kazakhstan	31:20.1	+3:02.3
34	1	Li Hongxue	China	31:20.7	+3:02.9
35	8	Nathalie Schwarz	Austria	31:23.2	+3:05.4
36	11	Paulina Maciuszek	Poland	31:25.8	+3:08.0
37	16	Elisa Brocard	Italy	31:28.0	+3:10.2
38	15	Barbara Jezeršek	Slovenia	31:40.0	+3:22.2
39	54	Brittany Webster	Canada	31:41.0	+3:23.2
40	12	Alena Sannikova	Belarus	31:42.2	+3:24.4
41	49	Daria Gaiazova	Canada	31:47.0	+3:29.2
42	58	Triin Ojaste	Estonia	31:54.3	+3:36.5
43	69	Anastassiya Slonova	Kazakhstan	31:56.6	+3:38.8
44	4	Veronika Mayerhofer	Austria	31:59.6	+3:41.8
45	48	Klara Moravcová	Czech Republic	32:00.6	+3:42.8
46	47	Kateryna Grygorenko	Ukraine	32:03.5	+3:45.7
47	3	Alena Procházková	Slovakia	32:08.4	+3:50.6
48	52	Lee Chae-won	South Korea	32:16.9	+3:59.1
49	2	Tatyana Ossipova	Kazakhstan	32:20.1	+4:02.3
50	55	Man Dandan	China	32:25.1	+4:07.3
51	61	Katja Višnar	Slovenia	32:47.0	+4:29.2
52	6	Amanda Ammar	Canada	32:48.8	+4:31.0
53	59	Kelime Çetinkaya	Turkey	32:58.0	+4:40.2
54	51	Heidi Widmer	Canada	33:01.9	+4:44.1
55	10	Maryna Lisohor	Ukraine	33:35.4	+5:17.6
56	56	Vedrana Malec	Croatia	33:42.3	+5:24.5
57	7	Nika Razinger	Slovenia	33:54.1	+5:36.3
58	68	Esther Bottomley	Australia	34:30.1	+6:12.3
59	62	Timea Sara	Romania	34:48.2	+6:30.4
60	60	Aimee Watson	Australia	34:56.0	+6:38.2
61	70	Katya Galstyan	Armenia	35:26.4	+7:08.6
62	66	Inga Dauškāne	Latvia	36:13.1	+7:55.3
63	57	Rosamund Musgrave	Great Britain	36:18.5	+8:00.7
64	64	Ingrida Ardišauskaitė	Lithuania	36:52.1	+8:34.3
65	67	Mathilde-Amivi Petitjean	Togo	37:26.7	+9:08.9
66	71	Ágnes Simon	Hungary	38:36.7	+10:18.9
67	74	Chinbatyn Otgontsetseg	Mongolia	38:43.1	+10:25.3
68	73	Alexandra Camenșcic	Moldova	39:52.6	+11:34.8
69	63	Tanja Karišik	Bosnia and Herzegovina	41:34.6	+13:16.8
70	65	Farzaneh Rezasoltani	Iran	42:31.3	+14:13.5
71	75	Marija Kolaroska	Macedonia	44:46.0	+16:28.2
72	72	Ivana Kovačević	Serbia	45:21.3	+17:03.5
DSQ	38	Yuliya Chekalyova	Russia	~~29:36.1~~	~~+1:18.3~~
DSQ	32	Yuliya Ivanova	Russia	~~29:59.4~~	~~+1:41.6~~
DSQ	22	Marina Piller	Italy	~~31:07.6~~	~~+2:49.8~~
	76	Angelica di Silvestri	Dominica	Did not start	
