= Vera Viczián =

Hungarian cross-country skier (born 1972)

Vera Viczián (born 28 September 1972) is a Hungarian cross-country skier who has competed since 2003. She finished 75th in the 10 km event at the 2010 Winter Olympics in Vancouver.

At the FIS Nordic World Ski Championships 2009 in Liberec, Viczián finished 81st in the individual sprint event.

Her best career finish was fourth twice in lesser events, both in Macedonia in January 2010 up to 10 km.
