= Teodora Malcheva =

Bulgarian cross-country skier (born 1983)

Teodora Malcheva (born January 25, 1983) is a Bulgarian cross-country skier who has competed since 2002. She finished 66th in the 10 km event at the 2010 Winter Olympics in Vancouver.

Malcheva's best finish at the FIS Nordic World Ski Championships was 17th in the team sprint event at Oberstdorf in 2005 while her best individual finish was 63rd in the individual sprint event at those same championships.

Her best World Cup finish was 60th in a 10 km event in Canada in 2010.
