= Inga Dauškāne =

Latvian cross-country skier (born 1980)

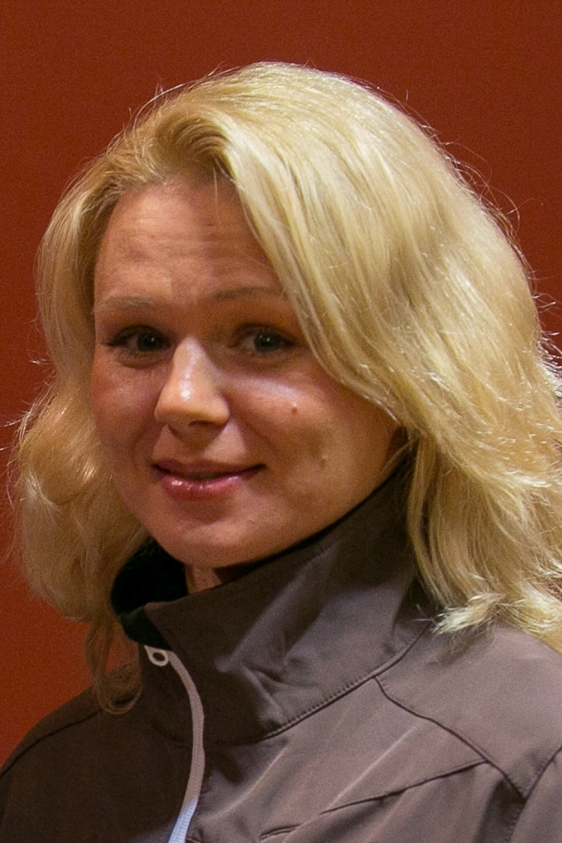
- Dauškāne in 2014

Personal information
- Born: 12 April 1980 (age 44); Latvian SSR
- Height: 171 cm (5 ft 7 in)
- Weight: 58 kg (128 lb)

Sport
- Country: Latvia
- Sport: Cross-country skiing

Inga Dauškāne (born 12 April 1980) is a Latvian cross-country skier. She competed at the FIS Nordic World Ski Championships 2011 in Oslo, the FIS Nordic World Ski Championships 2013 in Val di Fiemme, and at the 2014 Winter Olympics in Sochi.
