= Rosamund Musgrave =

British cross-country skier (born 1986)

Rosamund "Posy" Musgrave (born 28 October 1986) is a British former cross-country skier.

Born in Cairo, Egypt, due to her father's work in the oil industry, she competed for Great Britain at the 2014 Winter Olympics in Sochi. She finished 41st in the women's sprint qualification event and 66th in the women's 10 kilometre classical event.

She is the older sister of fellow cross-country skier Andrew Musgrave.

In May 2015 she announced her retirement from competition and her appointment as an athlete manager with GMR Marketing.

After retiring, Posy has been working for Eurosport commentating on their coverage of cross country skiing. She also coaches and supports the British Nordic Development Squad.

Posy got married near her family home at Barra Castle in Aberdeenshire on 3 July 2021 to Daniel Johnson.
