= Nina Broznić =

Croatian cross-country skier (born 1991)

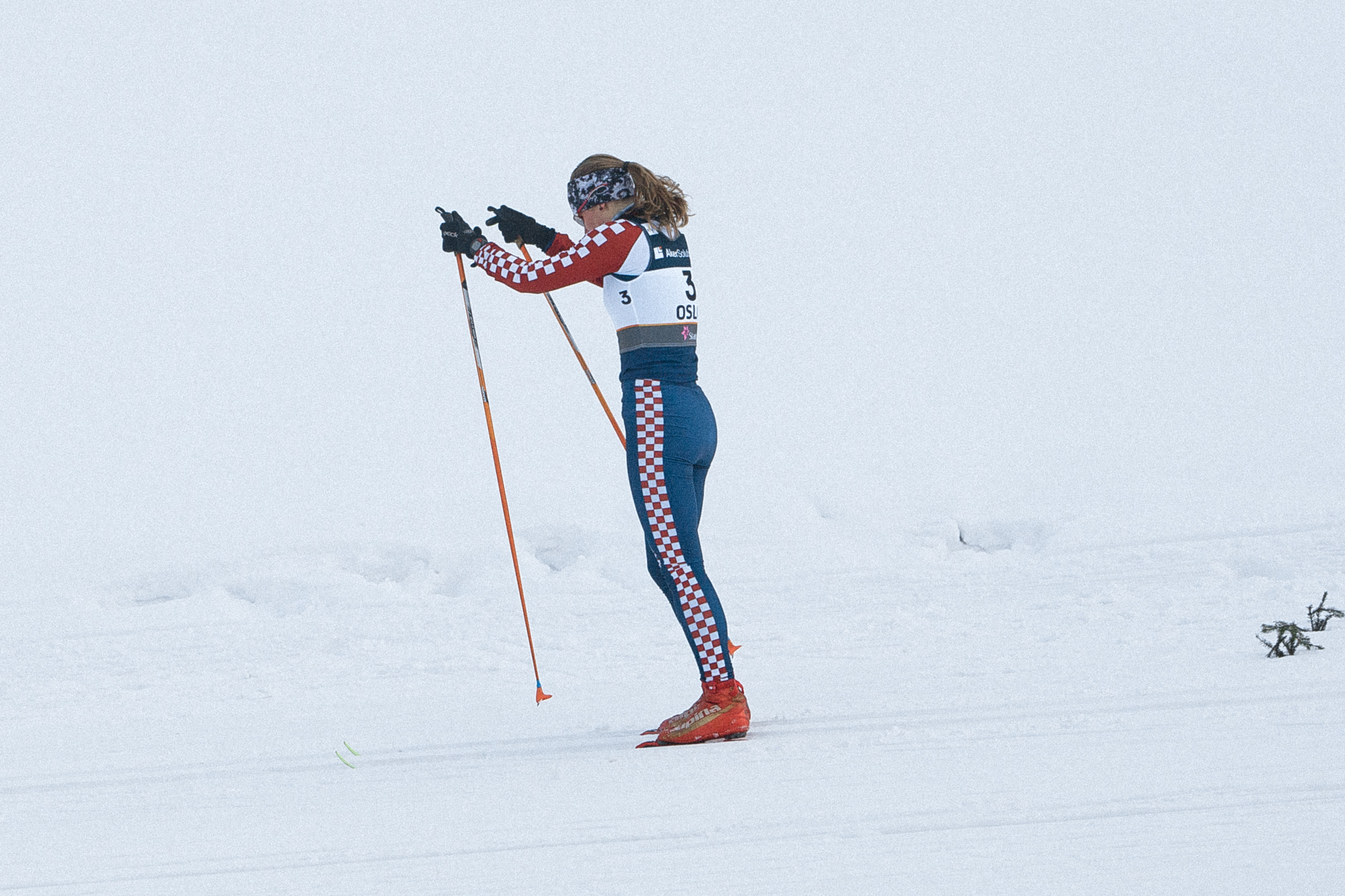
Broznić in Oslo 2011

Nina Broznić (born 19 February 1991 in Rijeka) is a Croatian cross-country skier who has competed since 2007. She finished 52nd in the individual sprint event at the 2010 Winter Olympics in Vancouver.

Broznić has two victories in lesser events, both in sprints, in 2008 and 2009.
