= Ágnes Simon (skier) =

Hungarian cross-country skier (born 1974)

Personal information
- Born: 23 September 1974 (age 51) Cluj-Napoca, Romania

Sport
- Country: Hungary
- Sport: Cross-country skiing

Ágnes Simon (born 23 September 1974 in Cluj-Napoca, Romania) is a cross-country skier competing for Hungary. She competed for Hungary at the 2014 Winter Olympics in the 10 kilometre classical race, finishing in 69th place out of 76 competitors.

Simon originally competed for her native Romania but made the switch to competing for Hungary in 2005.
