= Tatyana Osipova =

Kazakhstani cross-country skier (born 1987)

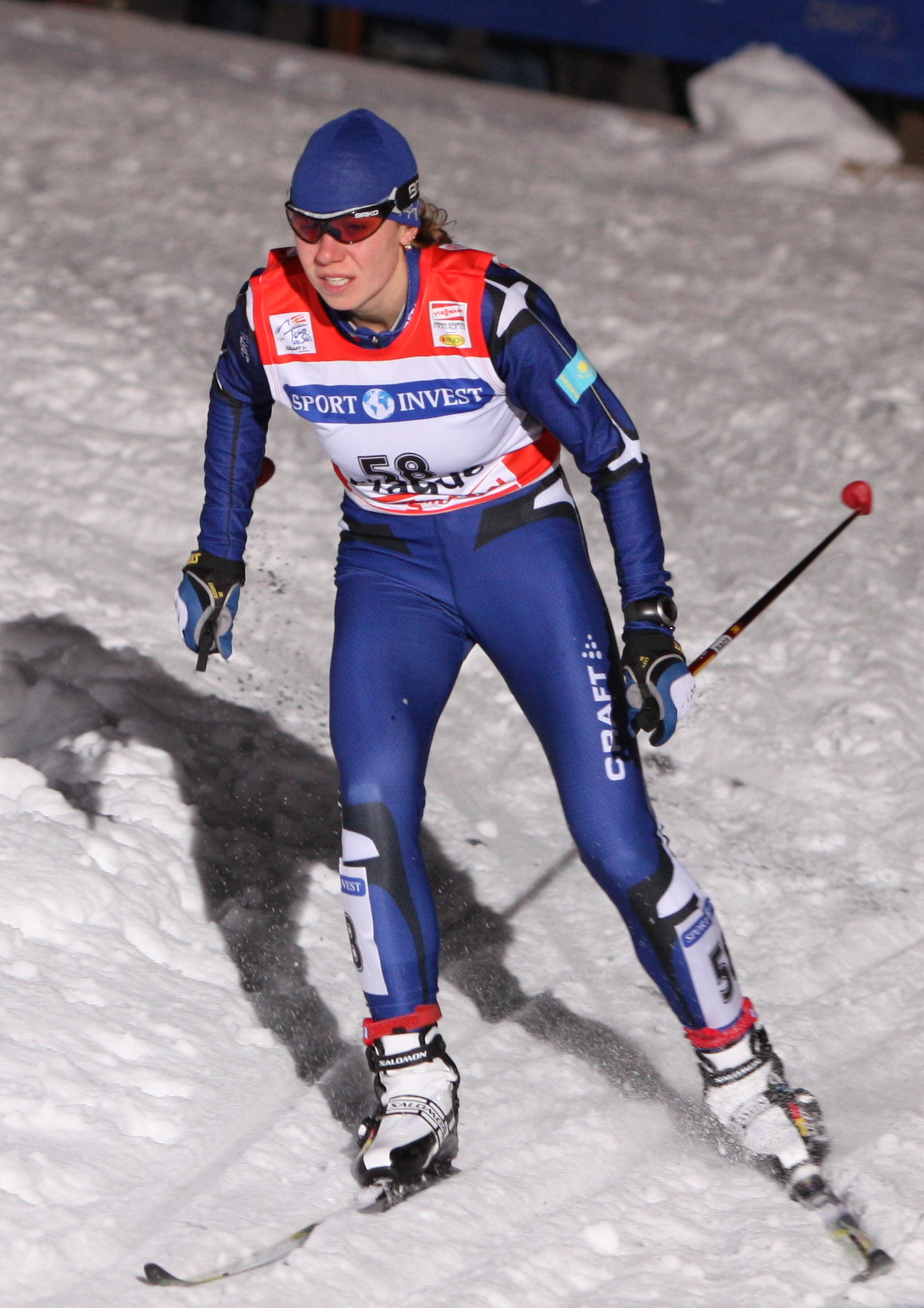
- Osipova in 2010
- Full name: Tatyana Andreyevna Roshchina-Osipova
- Born: 23 September 1987 (age 37); Kokshetau, Akmola, Kazakhstan
- Height: 1.71 m (5 ft 7 in)

Tatyana Andreyevna Roshchina-Osipova (Татьяна Андреевна Рощина-Осипова; born 23 September 1987 in Kokshetau, Akmola) is a Kazakhstani cross-country skier who has been competing since 2004. At the 2010 Winter Olympics in Vancouver, she finished tenth in the 4 × 5 km relay and 36th in the 10 km event.

Osipova's best finish at the FIS Nordic World Ski Championships was 11th in the 4 × 5 km relay at Liberec in 2009. Her best individual finish was 45th in the 7.5 km + 7.5 km double pursuit at those same championships.

Osipova's best World Cup finish was eighth in a 4 × 5 km relay at Norway in 2009 while her best individual finish was 57th in a 15 km mass start event at France in 2008.

In marriage she bears the name Osipova. Her husband is the Kazakhstani cross-country skier Alexander Osipov.
