= Ingrida Ardišauskaitė =

Lithuanian cross-country skier (born 1993)

Personal information
- Born: 17 January 1993 (age 33) Utena, Lithuania
- Height: 178 cm (5 ft 10 in)
- Weight: 65 kg (143 lb)

Sport
- Club: Utena ski club

Ingrida Ardišauskaitė (born 17 January 1993 in Utena, Lithuania) is a retired Lithuanian cross-country skier.

She competed at FIS Nordic World Ski Championships 2011 and FIS Nordic World Ski Championships 2013.

In 2014 Ardišauskaitė was selected to represent Lithuania at the 2014 Winter Olympic Games. In August 2014 Ardišauskaitė officially announced her retirement from skiing.
