= Hanna Kolb =

German cross-country skier (born 1991)

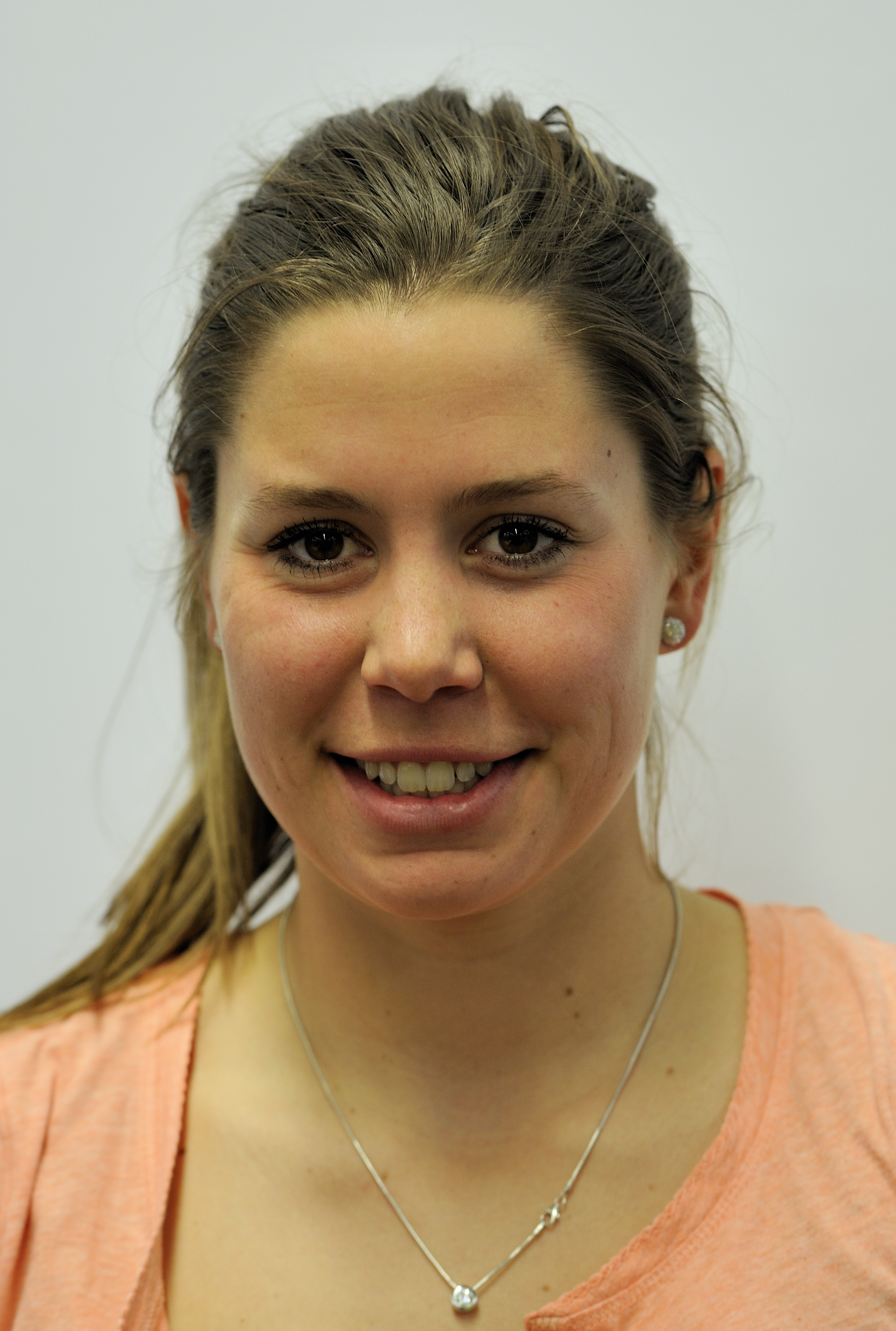
- Kolb in 2014

Personal information
- Nationality: Germany
- Born: 21 August 1991 (age 34) Stuttgart, Germany

Sport
- Sport: Skiing
- Club: TSV Buchenberg

World Cup career
- Seasons: 9 – (2010–2018)
- Indiv. starts: 115
- Indiv. podiums: 0
- Team starts: 13
- Team podiums: 2
- Team wins: 0
- Overall titles: 0 – (32nd in 2016)
- Discipline titles: 0
Medal record
Women's cross-country skiing
Representing Germany
U23 World Championships
Gold medal – first place	2012 Erzurum	Individual sprint
Bronze medal – third place	2013 Liberec	Individual sprint
Junior World Championships
Bronze medal – third place	2009 Praz de Lys-Sommand	4 × 3.33 km relay
Bronze medal – third place	2011 Otepää	4 × 3.33 km relay
- Updated on 14 January 2019

Hanna Kolb (born 21 August 1991 in Stuttgart) is a German cross-country skier who has competed since 2007. She finished 25th in the individual sprint event at the 2010 Winter Olympics in Vancouver.

Kolb's best World Cup finish was 11th in a sprint event at Germany in 2009.

== Cross-country skiing results ==
All results are sourced from the International Ski Federation (FIS).

=== Olympic Games ===
Year	Age	10 km individual	15 km skiathlon	30 km mass start	Sprint	4 × 5 km relay	Team sprint
2010	18	—	—	—	25	—	—
2014	22	—	—	—	29	—	—
2018	26	—	—	—	36	—	—

=== World Championships ===
Year	Age	10 km individual	15 km skiathlon	30 km mass start	Sprint	4 × 5 km relay	Team sprint
2011	19	—	—	—	59	—	—
2013	21	—	—	—	23	—	8
2015	23	—	—	—	30	—	—
2017	25	—	—	—	11	—	—

=== World Cup ===
All results are sourced from the International Ski Federation (FIS).

==== Season standings ====
Season	Age	Discipline standings			Ski Tour standings			
Season	Age	Overall	Distance	Sprint	Nordic Opening	Tour de Ski	World Cup Final	Ski Tour Canada
2010	19	78	—	54	—N/a	—	—	—N/a
2011	20	54	78	35	—	DNF	—	—N/a
2012	21	49	59	29	—	DNF	44	—N/a
2013	22	37	NC	12	DNF	DNF	45	—N/a
2014	23	39	NC	14	DNF	DNF	—	—N/a
2015	24	45	NC	15	70	DNF	—N/a	—N/a
2016	25	32	NC	13	56	DNF	—N/a	39
2017	26	58	NC	29	62	DNF	48	—N/a
2018	27	60	NC	30	—	DNF	—	—N/a

==== Team podiums ====
- 2 podiums (2 TS)

No.	Season	Date	Location	Race	Level	Place	Teammate
1	2012–13	7 December 2012	Quebec City, Canada	6 × 1.6 km Team Sprint F	World Cup	2nd	Herrmann
2	2015–16	17 January 2016	Planica, Slovenia	6 × 1.2 km Team Sprint F	World Cup	3rd	Ringwald
