= 2015 Tour de Ski =

Cross-country skiing event

Tour de Ski
2014–15 FIS Cross-Country World Cup

Ski tour details
- Venue(s): Oberstdorf, Germany; Val Müstair, Switzerland; Toblach, Italy; Val di Fiemme, Italy
- Dates: 3 January 2015 – 10 January 2015
- Stages: 7

Results
Men
Jersey awarded to the men's overall winner	Winner	Petter Northug (NOR)
	Second	Evgeniy Belov (RUS)
	Third	Calle Halfvarsson (SWE)
Jersey awarded to the men's sprint classification winner	Sprint	Petter Northug (NOR)
Women
Jersey awarded to the women's overall winner	Winner	Marit Bjørgen (NOR)
	Second	Therese Johaug (NOR)
	Third	Heidi Weng (NOR)
Jersey awarded to the women's sprint classification winner	Sprint	Marit Bjørgen (NOR)

The 2015 Tour de Ski was the 9th edition of the Tour de Ski. The Stage World Cup event began in Oberstdorf, Germany on January 3, 2015, and ended in Val di Fiemme, Italy on January 10, 2015. The titles were being defended by Therese Johaug (Norway) and Martin Johnsrud Sundby (Norway), the former of which came second to Marit Bjørgen, while Sundby initially retained his title until it was passed on to Petter Northug when Sundby was stripped of the title.

On July 20, 2016, Sundby was stripped of the win due to illegal use of asthma medication during the race.

== Schedule ==
Stage	Venue	Date	Event	Technique	Distance		Start time (CET)	
Stage	Venue	Date	Event	Technique	Women	Men	Women	Men
1	Oberstdorf (GER)	3 January 2015	Prologue, individual start	Freestyle	3 km	4 km	10:45	12:45
2	Oberstdorf (GER)	4 January 2015	Distance, pursuit	Classic	10 km	15 km	11:00	12:15
3	Val Müstair (SUI)	6 January 2015	Sprint, qualification and finals	Freestyle	1.4 km	1.4 km	13:15	
4	Toblach (ITA)	7 January 2015	Distance, individual start	Classic	5 km	10 km	15:30	13:00
5	Toblach (ITA)	8 January 2015	Distance, pursuit	Freestyle	15 km	25 km	15:30	12:15
6	Val di Fiemme (ITA)	10 January 2015	Distance, mass start	Classic	10 km	15 km	15:45	13:00
7	Val di Fiemme (ITA)	11 January 2015	Final Climb, pursuit	Freestyle	9 km	9 km	13:30	12:00

== Final standings ==
Legend
Denotes the winner of the Overall standings	Denotes the winner of the Sprint standings

=== Overall standings ===
Final overall standings after all seven stages, with bonus seconds deducted.

==== Men ====
Final overall standings (1–10)
Rank	Name	Time
1	Petter Northug (NOR)	3:27:14.4
2	Evgeniy Belov (RUS)	+12.6
3	Calle Halfvarsson (SWE)	+30.7
4	Dario Cologna (SUI)	+1:33.1
5	Roland Clara (ITA)	+2:00.7
6	Niklas Dyrhaug (NOR)	+2:04.0
7	Alexey Poltoranin (KAZ)	+2:28.2
8	Chris Jespersen (NOR)	+2:37.8
9	Maxim Vylegzhanin (RUS)	+2:51.2
10	Daniel Rickardsson (SWE)	+3:04.5

Final overall standings (11–45)
Rank	Name	Time
11	Marcus Hellner (SWE)	+3:18.3
12	Toni Livers (SUI)	+4:03.3
13	Simen Andreas Sveen (NOR)	+4:14.3
14	Stanislav Volzhentsev (RUS)	+4:24.8
15	Maurice Manificat (FRA)	+4:28.1
16	Jonas Dobler (GER)	+4:54.6
17	Eldar Rønning (NOR)	+4:57.4
18	Alexander Bessmertnykh (RUS)	+5:03.5
19	Andrew Musgrave (GBR)	+5:17.1
20	Tim Tscharnke (GER)	+5:26.4
21	Dietmar Nöckler (ITA)	+5:33.2
22	Jonas Baumann (SUI)	+5:34.2
23	Andrey Larkov (RUS)	+6:15.2
24	Francesco De Fabiani (ITA)	+6:19.9
25	Sergey Turyshev (RUS)	+6:23.4
26	Simon Andersson (SWE)	+7:46.8
27	Curdin Perl (SUI)	+7:51.4
28	Thomas Bing (GER)	+7:54.4
29	Vladisav Skobelev (RUS)	+7:54.5
30	Ivan Babikov (CAN)	+8:09.4
31	Lucas Bögl (GER)	+8:30.2
32	Dmitriy Yaparov (RUS)	+9:13.6
33	Giorgio Di Centa (ITA)	+9:24.4
34	Devon Kershaw (CAN)	+9:55.5
35	Anders Svanebo (SWE)	+10:42.4
36	Bernhard Tritscher (AUT)	+10:53.7
37	Veselin Tsinzov (BUL)	+11:21.4
38	Andy Kühne (GER)	+12:31.3
39	Florian Notz (GER)	+13:00.5
40	David Hofer (ITA)	+13:06.3
41	Maciej Kreczmer (POL)	+13:40.9
42	Thomas Wick (GER)	+13:57.5
43	Max Hauke (AUT)	+14:35.0
44	Martin Bajčičák (SVK)	+15:29.6
45	Karel Tammjärv (EST)	+19:02.5

==== Women ====
Final overall standings (1–10)
Rank	Name	Time
1	Marit Bjørgen (NOR)	2:34:44.6
2	Therese Johaug (NOR)	+1:39.2
3	Heidi Weng (NOR)	+1:59.5
4	Ragnhild Haga (NOR)	+7:32.2
5	Elizabeth Stephen (USA)	+7:41.8
6	Eva Vrabcová-Nývltová (CZE)	+8:29.4
7	Nicole Fessel (GER)	+8:55.8
8	Denise Herrmann (GER)	+9:35.1
9	Emma Wikén (SWE)	+9:47.9
10	Teresa Stadlober (AUT)	+9:53.8

Final overall standings (11–35)
Rank	Name	Time
11	Stefanie Böhler (GER)	+10:09.5
12	Maria Rydqvist (SWE)	+10:22.5
13	Aino-Kaisa Saarinen (FIN)	+10:33.0
14	Anne Kyllönen (FIN)	+11:09.8
15	Alevtina Tanygina (RUS)	+11:29.8
16	Sylwia Jaśkowiec (POL)	+11:41.7
17	Nathalie von Siebenthal (SUI)	+11:57.8
18	Coraline Thomas Hugue (FRA)	+13:02.2
19	Ilaria Debertolis (ITA)	+14:40.6
20	Nathalie Schwarz (AUT)	+14:46.2
21	Kornelia Kubińska (POL)	+14:50.8
22	Lea Einfalt (SLO)	+15:05.3
23	Virginia De Martin Topranin (ITA)	+15:14.1
24	Monique Siegel (GER)	+15:14.3
25	Yuliya Ivanova (RUS)	+15:23.4
26	Olga Kuzyukova (RUS)	+15:37.9
27	Helene Söderlund (SWE)	+15:43.7
28	Laura Orgué (ESP)	+16:11.7
29	Yevgeniya Shapovalova (RUS)	+16:13.6
30	Célia Aymonier (FRA)	+16:19.7
31	Oxana Usatova (RUS)	+17:14.6
32	Maria Gräfnings (SWE)	+17:36.8
33	Francesca Baudin (ITA)	+18:45.3
34	Anna Nechaevskaya (RUS)	+18:55.0
35	Anastasia Vlasova (RUS)	+26:19.5

=== Sprint standings ===
Final sprint standings after all seven stages, all bonus seconds counts.

==== Men ====
Final sprint standings (1–10)
Rank	Name	Time
1	Petter Northug (NOR)	2:01
2	Calle Halfvarsson (SWE)	1:29
3	Evgeniy Belov (RUS)	1:11
4	Dario Cologna (SUI)	0:59
5	Alexey Poltoranin (KAZ)	0:39
6	Bernhard Tritscher (AUT)	0:36
7	Simon Andersson (SWE)	0:30
8	Alex Harvey (CAN)	0:25
9	Tim Tscharnke (GER)	0:24
10	Niklas Dyrhaug (NOR)	0:18

==== Women ====
Final sprint standings (1–10)
Rank	Name	Time
1	Marit Bjørgen (NOR)	2:20
2	Heidi Weng (NOR)	1:48
3	Therese Johaug (NOR)	1:07
4	Ragnhild Haga (NOR)	0:36
5	Yevgeniya Shapovalova (RUS)	0:36
6	Justyna Kowalczyk (POL)	0:21
7	Anne Kyllönen (FIN)	0:14
8	Ilaria Debertolis (ITA)	0:13
9	Célia Aymonier (FRA)	0:12
10	Aino-Kaisa Saarinen (FIN)	0:08

== Stages ==
=== Stage 1 ===
3 January 2015, Oberstdorf, Germany – Prologue

Men – 4.4 km Freestyle (individual)
Rank	Name	Time
1	Dario Cologna (SUI)	9:54.2
2	Calle Halfvarsson (SWE)	+5.0
3	Petter Northug (NOR)	+5.5
4	Ilia Chernousov (RUS)	+7.0
5	Marcus Hellner (SWE)	+8.2
6	Evgeniy Belov (RUS)	+8.5
7	Andrey Larkov (RUS)	+9.0
8	Jonas Baumann (SUI)	+11.6
9	Maurice Manificat (FRA)	+11.8
10	Martin Johnsrud Sundby (NOR)	+11.9

Women – 3.2 km Freestyle (individual)
Rank	Name	Time
1	Marit Bjørgen (NOR)	7:53.0
2	Heidi Weng (NOR)	+10.7
3	Ragnhild Haga (NOR)	+12.2
4	Therese Johaug (NOR)	+13.2
5	Nicole Fessel (GER)	+13.5
6	Ingvild Flugstad Østberg (NOR)	+15.1
7	Sadie Bjornsen (USA)	+19.0
8	Elizbeth Stephen (USA)	+19.9
9	Coraline Hugue (FRA)	+20.0
10	Justyna Kowalczyk (POL)	+20.3

=== Stage 2 ===
4 January 2015, Oberstdorf, Germany

Men – 15 km Classic (pursuit)
Rank	Name	Time
1	Petter Northug (NOR)	42:01.2
2	Alex Harvey (CAN)	+0.6
3	Calle Halfvarsson (SWE)	+0.8
4	Niklas Dyrhaug (NOR)	+2.0
5	Alexey Poltoranin (KAZ)	+2.1
6	Dario Cologna (SUI)	+2.3
7	Francesco De Fabiani (ITA)	+3.4
8	Martin Johnsrud Sundby (NOR)	+3.8
9	Marcus Hellner (SWE)	+5.2
10	Dietmar Nöckler (ITA)	+6.5

Women – 10 km Classic (pursuit)
Rank	Name	Time
1	Marit Bjørgen (NOR)	29:27.6
2	Heidi Weng (NOR)	+56.2
3	Therese Johaug (NOR)	+56.8
4	Stina Nilsson (SWE)	+1:33.5
5	Nicole Fessel (GER)	+1:37.7
6	Justyna Kowalczyk (POL)	+1:39.6
7	Emma Wikén (SWE)	+1:41.8
8	Alevtina Tanygina (RUS)	+1:45.3
9	Ingvild Flugstad Østberg (NOR)	+1:46.3
10	Ragnhild Haga (NOR)	+1:47.3

=== Stage 3 ===
6 January 2015, Val Müstair, Switzerland

Men – 1.4 km Sprint Freestyle
Rank	Name	Time
1	Federico Pellegrino (ITA)	3:13.65
2	Petter Northug (NOR)	+0.18
3	Martin Johnsrud Sundby (NOR)	+0.19
4	Evgeniy Belov (RUS)	+2.33
5	Ilia Chernousov (RUS)	+6.07
6	Calle Halfvarsson (SWE)	+15.05

Women – 1.4 km Sprint Freestyle
Rank	Name	Time
1	Marit Bjørgen (NOR)	3:37.73
2	Heidi Weng (NOR)	+1.97
3	Ingvild Flugstad Østberg (NOR)	+2.41
4	Stina Nilsson (SWE)	+6.40
5	Maiken Caspersen Falla (NOR)	+7.74
6	Laurien van der Graaff (SUI)	+27.71

=== Stage 4 ===
7 January 2015, Toblach, Italy

Men – 10 km Classic (individual)
Rank	Name	Time
1	Alexey Poltoranin (KAZ)	22:58.1
2	Evgeniy Belov (RUS)	+0.5
3	Martin Johnsrud Sundby (NOR)	+4.2
4	Calle Halfvarsson (SWE)	+9.4
5	Dario Cologna (SUI)	+14.3
6	Daniel Rickardsson (SWE)	+20.4
7	Petter Northug (NOR)	+22.8
8	Niklas Dyrhaug (NOR)	+23.4
9	Eldar Rønning (NOR)	+26.3
10	Iivo Niskanen (FIN)	+26.5

Women – 5 km Classic (individual)
Rank	Name	Time
1	Marit Bjørgen (NOR)	12:48.5
2	Therese Johaug (NOR)	+10.8
3	Heidi Weng (NOR)	+13.1
4	Emma Wikén (SWE)	+13.8
5	Justyna Kowalczyk (POL)	+17.6
6	Anne Kyllönen (FIN)	+19.8
7	Yevgeniya Shapovalova (RUS)	+21.1
8	Sadie Bjornsen (USA)	+22.7
9	Ingvild Flugstad Østberg (NOR)	+26.1
10	Anna Haag (SWE)	+31.6

=== Stage 5 ===
8 January 2015, Toblach, Italy

Men – 25 km Freestyle (pursuit)
Rank	Name	Time
1	Petter Northug (NOR)	53:56.9
2	Calle Halfvarsson (SWE)	+2.0
3	Evgeniy Belov (RUS)	+2.4
4	Niklas Dyrhaug (NOR)	+1:45.9
5	Alex Harvey (CAN)	+1:46.0
6	Dario Cologna (SUI)	+1:46.4
7	Alexey Poltoranin (KAZ)	+1:49.1
8	Daniel Rickardsson (SWE)	+1:51.0
9	Maxim Vylegzhanin (RUS)	+2:08.3
10	Andrew Musgrave (GBR)	+2:08.8

Women – 15 km Freestyle (pursuit)
Rank	Name	Time
1	Marit Bjørgen (NOR)	36:37.9
2	Heidi Weng (NOR)	+1:58.8
3	Therese Johaug (NOR)	+2:51.4
4	Emma Wikén (SWE)	+4:20.4
5	Ragnhild Haga (NOR)	+4:23.7
6	Justyna Kowalczyk (POL)	+4:46.7
7	Anna Haag (SWE)	+4:48.7
8	Nicole Fessel (GER)	+4:48.7
9	Denise Herrmann (GER)	+5:16.0
10	Laura Mononen (FIN)	+4:23.7

=== Stage 6 ===
10 January 2015, Val di Fiemme, Italy

Men – 15 km Classic (mass start)
Rank	Name	Time
1	Tim Tscharnke (GER)	46:48.8
2	Alexey Poltoranin (KAZ)	+0.0
3	Dario Cologna (SUI)	+0.3
4	Stanislav Volzhentsev (RUS)	+0.7
5	Alexander Bessmertnykh (RUS)	+0.7
6	Thomas Bing (GER)	+2.0
7	Francesco De Fabiani (ITA)	+3.2
8	Andrey Larkov (RUS)	+4.5
9	Dietmar Nöckler (ITA)	+4.8
10	Jonas Baumann (SUI)	+9.7

Women – 10 km Classic (mass start)
Rank	Name	Time
1	Therese Johaug (NOR)	33:10.4
2	Marit Bjørgen (NOR)	+1.1
3	Heidi Weng (NOR)	+5.5
4	Aino-Kaisa Saarinen (FIN)	+1:13.1
5	Elizabeth Stephen (USA)	+1:39.6
6	Teresa Stadlober (AUT)	+1:40.9
7	Justyna Kowalczyk (POL)	+1:47.2
8	Eva Vrabcová-Nývltová (CZE)	+1:47.7
9	Ragnhild Haga (NOR)	+1:50.5
10	Denise Herrmann (GER)	+2:01.3

=== Stage 7 ===
11 January 2015, Val di Fiemme, Italy

Men – 9 km Final Climb (pursuit)
Rank	Name	Time
1	Roland Clara (ITA)	29:13.0
2	Maurice Manificat (FRA)	+2.1
DSQ	Martin Johnsrud Sundby (NOR)	–
3	Toni Livers (SUI)	+16.9
4	Simen Andreas Sveen (NOR)	+24.8
5	Evgeniy Belov (RUS)	+30.2
6	Chris Jespersen (NOR)	+33.3
7	Stanislav Volzhentsev (RUS)	+33.4
8	Dario Cologna (SUI)	+34.4
9	Niklas Dyrhaug (NOR)	+39.6
10	Marcus Hellner (SWE)	+40.8

Women – 9 km Final Climb (pursuit)
Rank	Name	Time
1	Therese Johaug (NOR)	32:16.4
2	Heidi Weng (NOR)	+59.4
3	Marit Bjørgen (NOR)	+1:11.1
4	Elizabeth Stephen (USA)	+1:13.5
5	Eva Vrabcová-Nyvltová (CZE)	+1:54.6
6	Ragnhild Haga (NOR)	+1:56.2
7	Maria Rydqvist (SWE)	+1:56.3
8	Laura Orgué (ESP)	+2:16.9
9	Nicole Fessel (GER)	+2:20.3
10	Teresa Stadlober (AUT)	+2:30.5
