= Nika Razinger =

Slovenian cross-country skier

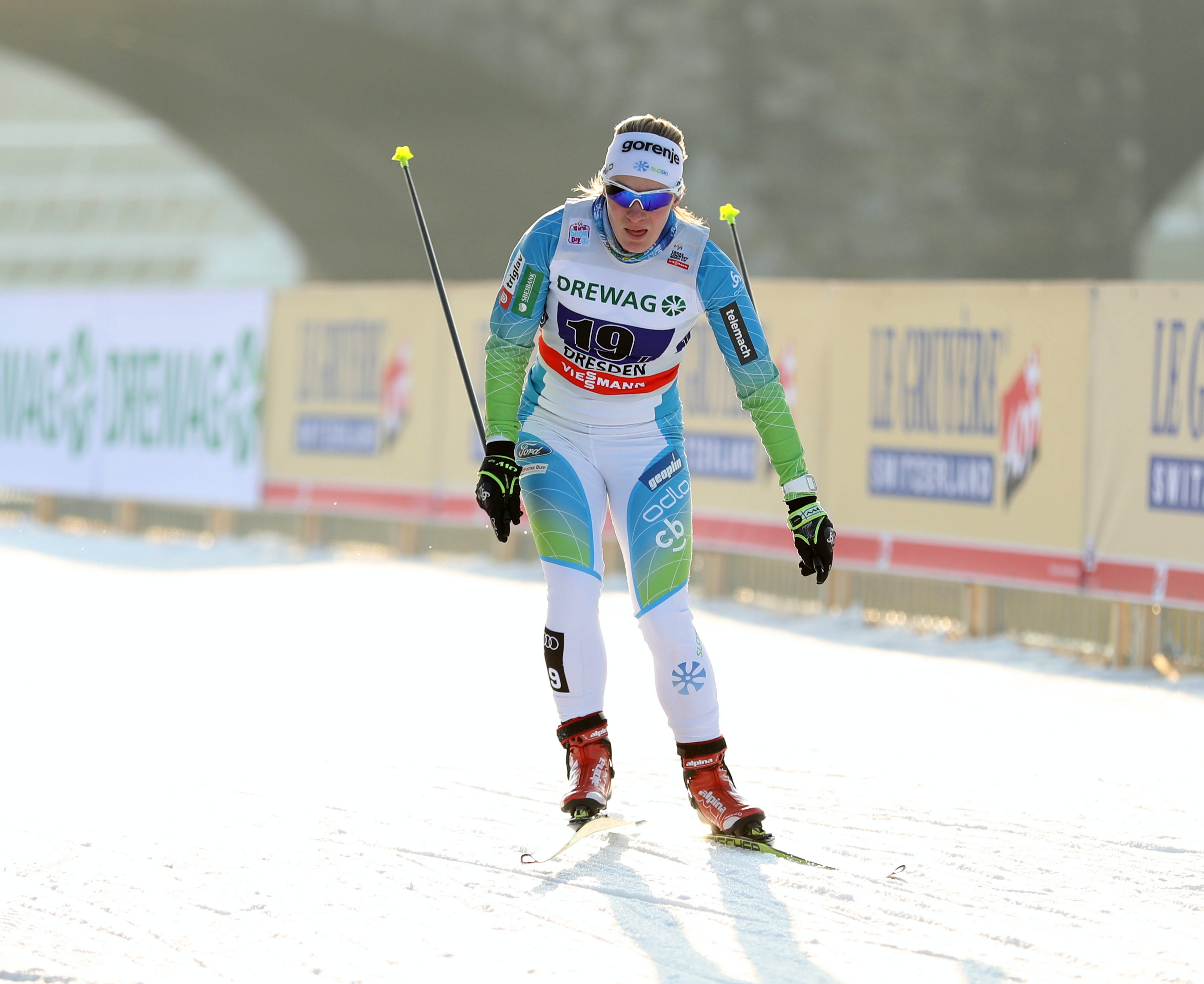
- Nika Razinger in January, 2018

Personal information
- Nationality: Slovenia
- Born: October 5, 1993 (age 32) Jesenice, Slovenia

Sport
- Sport: Skiing
- Club: TSK Bled

World Cup career
- Seasons: 4 – (2014–2016, 2018)
- Indiv. starts: 43
- Indiv. podiums: 0
- Team starts: 5
- Team podiums: 0
- Overall titles: 0 – (49th in 2016)
- Discipline titles: 0
Medal record
Women's cross-country skiing
Representing Slovenia
Junior World Championships
Gold medal – first place	2012 Erzurum	10 km skiathlon
Bronze medal – third place	2012 Erzurum	4 × 3.33 km relay
- Updated on 27 May 2019

Nika Razinger (born 5 October 1993) is a Slovenian cross-country skier. She competed at the 2014 Winter Olympics in Sochi.

== Cross-country skiing results ==
All results are sourced from the International Ski Federation (FIS).

=== Olympic Games ===
Year	Age	10 km individual	15 km skiathlon	30 km mass start	Sprint	4 × 5 km relay	Team sprint
2014	20	58	—	—	26	—	—
2018	24	69	—	—	52	—	—

=== World Championships ===
Year	Age	10 km individual	15 km skiathlon	30 km mass start	Sprint	4 × 5 km relay	Team sprint
2013	19	—	54	—	53	—	—
2015	21	—	—	—	41	10	9

=== World Cup ===
==== Season standings ====
Season	Age	Discipline standings			Ski Tour standings			
Season	Age	Overall	Distance	Sprint	Nordic Opening	Tour de Ski	World Cup Final	Ski Tour Canada
2014	20	80	—	50	—	—	—	—N/a
2015	21	84	NC	44	—	—	—N/a	—N/a
2016	22	49	NC	31	64	DNF	—N/a	DNF
2018	24	90	NC	62	DNF	—	—	—N/a
