= Martine Ek Hagen =

Norwegian cross-country skier

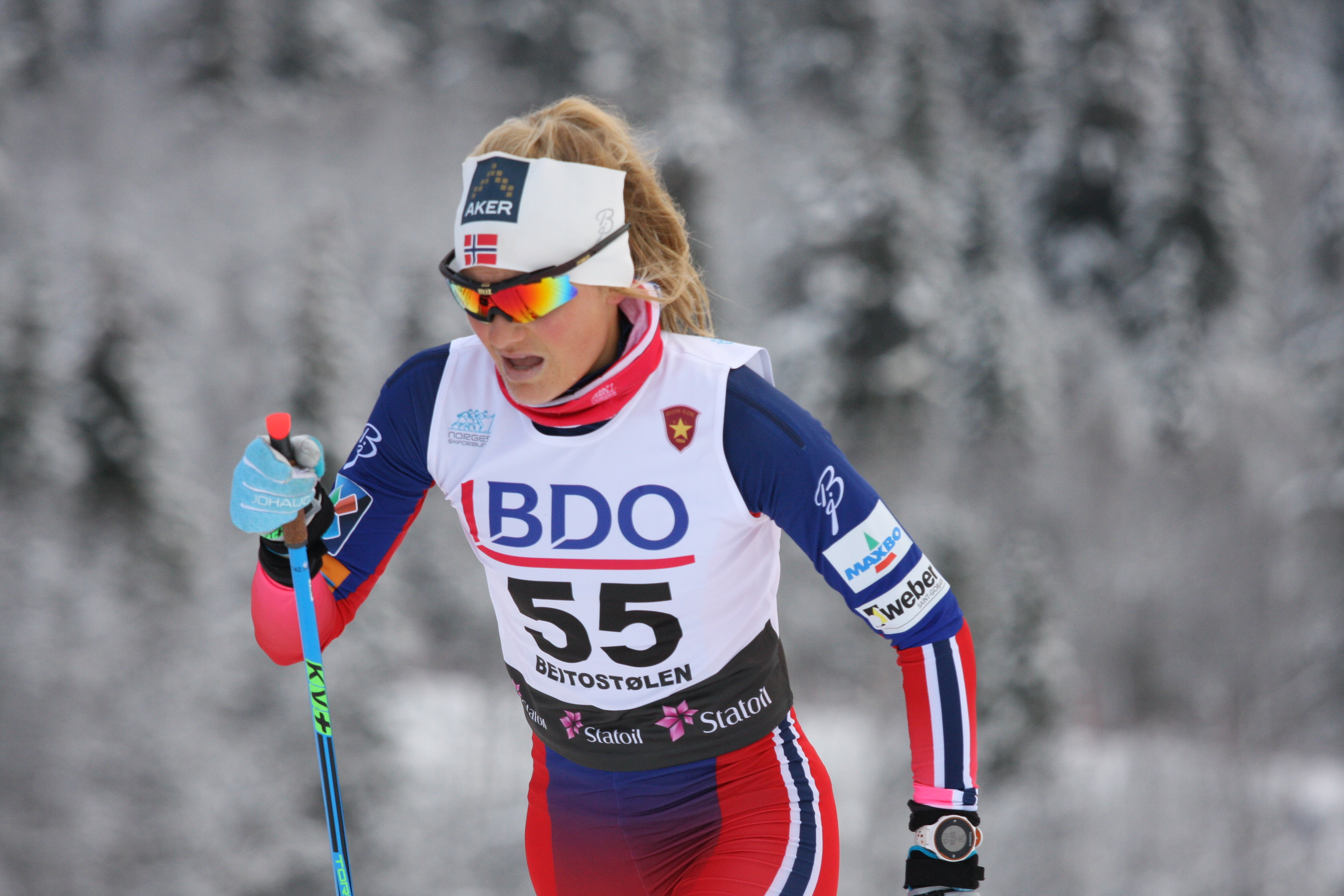

Personal information
- Nationality: Norway
- Born: 4 April 1991 (age 35) Ytre Enebakk, Norway

Sport
- Sport: Skiing
- Club: IL i BUL

World Cup career
- Seasons: 7 – (2011–2016, 2018)
- Indiv. starts: 42
- Indiv. podiums: 1
- Indiv. wins: 1
- Team starts: 4
- Team podiums: 2
- Team wins: 1
- Overall titles: 0 – (17th in 2015)
- Discipline titles: 0
Medal record
Women's cross-country skiing
Representing Norway
U23 World Championships
Gold medal – first place	2012 Erzurum	15 km skiathlon
Gold medal – first place	2014 Val di Fiemme	15 km skiathlon
Gold medal – first place	2014 Val di Fiemme	10 km classical
Bronze medal – third place	2012 Erzurum	10 km classical
Junior World Championships
Gold medal – first place	2011 Otepää	4 × 3.33 km relay
Silver medal – second place	2011 Otepää	10 km skiathlon
- Updated on 21 April 2019

Martine Ek Hagen (born 4 April 1991) is a Norwegian cross-country skier from Ytre Enebakk.

She competed at the FIS Nordic World Ski Championships 2013 in Val di Fiemme, and at the FIS Nordic World Ski Championships 2015 in Falun.

On 4 April 2018, she announced her retirement from cross-country skiing.

== Cross-country skiing results ==
All results are sourced from the International Ski Federation (FIS).

=== World Championships ===
Year	Age	10 km individual	15 km skiathlon	30 km mass start	Sprint	4 × 5 km relay	Team sprint
2013	21	32	—	—	—	—	—
2015	23	—	12	12	—	—	—

=== World Cup ===
==== Season standings ====
Season	Age	Discipline standings			Ski Tour standings			
Season	Age	Overall	Distance	Sprint	Nordic Opening	Tour de Ski	World Cup Final	Ski Tour Canada
2011	19	126	92	—	—	—	—	—N/a
2012	20	47	33	NC	—	—	9	—N/a
2013	21	49	37	NC	13	—	—	—N/a
2014	22	58	43	NC	—	—	14	—N/a
2015	23	17	8	70	13	DNF	—N/a	—N/a
2016	24	90	67	NC	DNF	—	—N/a	—
2018	26	97	72	—	—	—	—	—N/a

==== Individual podiums ====
- 1 victory – (1 WC)

No.	Season	Date	Location	Race	Level	Place
1	2014–15	25 January 2015	Rybinsk, Russia	7.5 km + 7.5 km Skiathlon C/F	World Cup	1st

==== Team podiums ====
- 1 victory – (1 RL)
- 2 podiums – (2 RL)

No.	Season	Date	Location	Race	Level	Place	Teammates
1	2012–13	25 November 2012	Gällivare, Sweden	4 × 5 km Relay C/F	World Cup	1st	Skofterud / Johaug / Bjørgen
2	2012–13	20 January 2013	La Clusaz, France	4 × 5 km Relay C/F	World Cup	3rd	Skofterud / Østberg / Jacobsen
