= Olga Kuzyukova =

Russian cross-country skier

Personal information
- Nationality: Russia
- Born: 27 September 1985 (age 40) Rubtsovsk, Soviet Union

Sport
- Sport: Skiing

World Cup career
- Seasons: 7 – (2008–2011, 2013–2015)
- Indiv. starts: 47
- Indiv. podiums: 0
- Team starts: 4
- Team podiums: 0
- Overall titles: 0 – (46th in 2014)
- Discipline titles: 0

Olga Kuzyukova (born September 27, 1985) is a Russian cross-country skier. She competed at the 2014 Winter Olympics in Sochi, in skiathlon and women's classical.

== Cross-country skiing results ==
All results are sourced from the International Ski Federation (FIS).

=== Olympic Games ===
Year	Age	10 km individual	15 km skiathlon	30 km mass start	Sprint	4 × 5 km relay	Team sprint
2014	28	12	23	—	—	DSQ	—

=== World Championships ===
Year	Age	10 km individual	15 km skiathlon	30 km mass start	Sprint	4 × 5 km relay	Team sprint
2013	27	—	—	21	—	—	—
2015	29	—	—	28	—	—	—

=== World Cup ===
==== Season standings ====
Season	Age	Discipline standings			Ski Tour standings		
Season	Age	Overall	Distance	Sprint	Nordic Opening	Tour de Ski	World Cup Final
2008	22	75	56	71	—N/a	—	—
2009	23	116	—	77	—N/a	—	—
2010	24	85	81	72	—N/a	—	—
2011	25	107	NC	76	DNF	—	—
2013	27	55	38	NC	—	32	—
2014	28	46	29	NC	—	22	—
2015	29	52	36	NC	26	26	—N/a
