= Francesca Baudin =

Italian cross-country skier (born 1993)

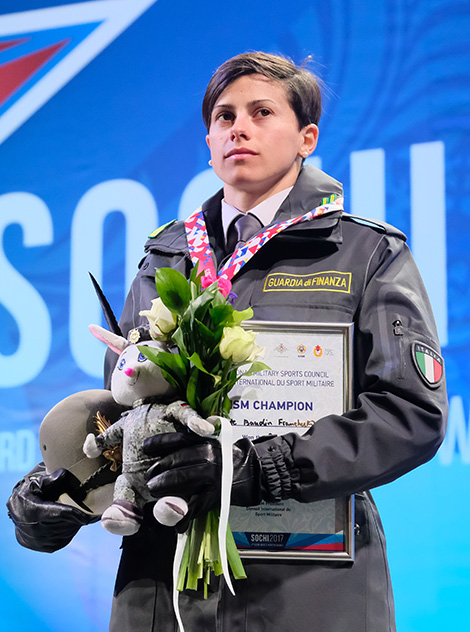
- Francesca Baudin at the 2017 World Military Games

Personal information
- Born: 25 November 1993 (age 32) Aosta, Italy

Sport
- Sport: Skiing
- Club: G.S. Fiamme Gialle

World Cup career
- Seasons: 5 – (2014–2015, 2017–2019)
- Indiv. starts: 24
- Indiv. podiums: 0
- Team starts: 1
- Team podiums: 0
- Overall titles: 0 – (98th in 2015)
- Discipline titles: 0
Medal record
Women's cross-country skiing
Representing Italy
U23 World Championships
Gold medal – first place	2015 Almaty	Individual sprint
World Military Games
Bronze medal – third place	2017 Sochi	10 km freestyle
Bronze medal – third place	2017 Sochi	Team sprint
- Updated on 21 December 2019

Francesca Baudin (born 25 November 1993) is an Italian cross-country skier. She competed in the World Cup 2015 season.

She represented Italy at the FIS Nordic World Ski Championships 2015 in Falun.

== Cross-country skiing results ==
All results are sourced from the International Ski Federation (FIS).

=== World Championships ===
Year	Age	10 km individual	15 km skiathlon	30 km mass start	Sprint	4 × 5 km relay	Team sprint
2013	19	—	—	—	47	—	—
2015	21	—	DNF	34	—	9	—

=== World Cup ===
==== Season standings ====
Season	Age	Discipline standings				Ski Tour standings		
Season	Age	Overall	Distance	Sprint	U23	Nordic Opening	Tour de Ski	World Cup Final
2014	20	NC	NC	NC	—N/a	—	—	—
2015	21	98	83	58	20	65	33	—N/a
2017	23	NC	NC	NC	—N/a	—	DNF	—
2018	24	NC	NC	NC	—N/a	—	—	—
2019	25	NC	NC	NC	—N/a	—	—	—
