= Sofia Bleckur =

Swedish former cross-country skier (born 1984)

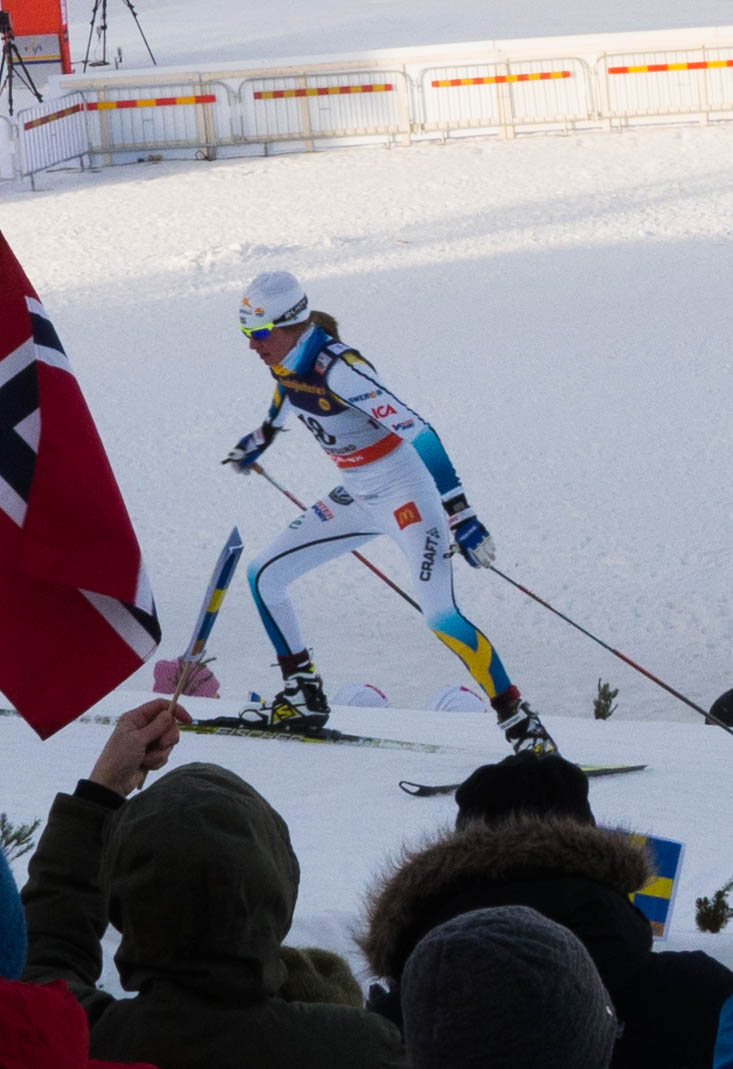
- Sofia Bleckur during World Cup competitions in Östersund, Sweden in February 2015

Personal information
- Full name: Anna Sofia Bleckur
- Nationality: Sweden
- Born: 3 July 1984 Rättvik, Sweden

Sport
- Sport: Skiing
- Club: IFK Mora SK

World Cup career
- Seasons: 10 – (2005–2009, 2011–2015)
- Indiv. starts: 47
- Indiv. podiums: 0
- Team starts: 9
- Team podiums: 1
- Team wins: 0
- Overall titles: 0 – (49th in 2015)
- Discipline titles: 0
Medal record
Women's cross-country skiing
Representing Sweden
World Championships
Silver medal – second place	2015 Falun	4 × 5 km relay
U23 World Championships
Silver medal – second place	2007 Tarvisio	10 km freestyle

Sofia Bleckur, born 3 July 1984, is a Swedish former cross-country skier who competed in the World Cup level, and for IFK Mora. She won Tjejvasan in 2005 and 2014. On 5 August 2015 she announced her retirement from cross-country skiing.

== Cross-country skiing results ==
All results are sourced from the International Ski Federation (FIS).

=== World Championships ===
- 1 medal – (1 silver)

Year	Age	10 km individual	15 km skiathlon	30 km mass start	Sprint	4 × 5 km relay	Team sprint
2013	28	—	34	18	—	—	—
2015	30	—	5	5	—	Silver	—

=== World Cup ===
==== Season standings ====
Season	Age	Discipline standings			Ski Tour standings		
Season	Age	Overall	Distance	Sprint	Nordic Opening	Tour de Ski	World Cup Final
2005	21	NC	NC	—	—N/a	—N/a	—N/a
2006	22	NC	NC	—	—N/a	—N/a	—N/a
2007	23	NC	NC	NC	—N/a	—	—N/a
2008	24	87	68	68	—N/a	—	—
2009	25	NC	NC	NC	—N/a	—	—
2011	27	110	74	NC	—	—	37
2012	28	57	42	—	—	—	—
2013	29	59	43	NC	25	—	—
2014	30	69	42	NC	46	—	—
2015	31	49	29	—	—	—	—N/a

==== Team podiums ====
- 1 podium – (1 RL)

No.	Season	Date	Location	Race	Level	Place	Teammates
1	2012–13	25 November 2012	Gällivare, Sweden	4 × 5 km Relay C/F	World Cup	2nd	Ingemarsdotter / Larsen / Kalla
