= Natalya Zhukova (skier) =

Russian cross-country skier

Personal information
- Nationality: Russia
- Born: 19 July 1992 Kazan, Russia

Sport
- Sport: Skiing

World Cup career
- Seasons: 4 – (2013–2016)
- Indiv. starts: 32
- Indiv. podiums: 0
- Team starts: 3
- Team podiums: 0
- Overall titles: 0 – (63rd in 2015)
- Discipline titles: 0
Medal record
Women's cross-country skiing
Representing Russia
Junior World Championships
Gold medal – first place	2012 Erzurum	5 km classical
Gold medal – first place	2012 Erzurum	4 × 3.33 km relay
- Updated on 25 May 2019

Natalya Zhukova (born July 19, 1992) is a Russian cross-country skier. She competed at the 2014 Winter Olympics in Sochi, in skiathlon and women's classical.

== Cross-country skiing results ==
All results are sourced from the International Ski Federation (FIS).

=== Olympic Games ===
Year	Age	10 km individual	15 km skiathlon	30 km mass start	Sprint	4 × 5 km relay	Team sprint
2014	21	7	16	15	—	DSQ	—

=== World Championships ===
Year	Age	10 km individual	15 km skiathlon	30 km mass start	Sprint	4 × 5 km relay	Team sprint
2013	20	33	—	—	—	—	—
2015	22	17	13	22	—	7	—

=== World Cup ===
==== Season standings ====
Season	Age	Discipline standings			Ski Tour standings			
Season	Age	Overall	Distance	Sprint	Nordic Opening	Tour de Ski	World Cup Final	Ski Tour Canada
2013	20	65	44	NC	—	—	—	—N/a
2014	21	71	45	NC	50	—	—	—N/a
2015	22	63	39	NC	37	—	—N/a	—N/a
2016	23	70	45	NC	42	—	—N/a	—
