= Emily Nishikawa =

Canadian cross-country skier

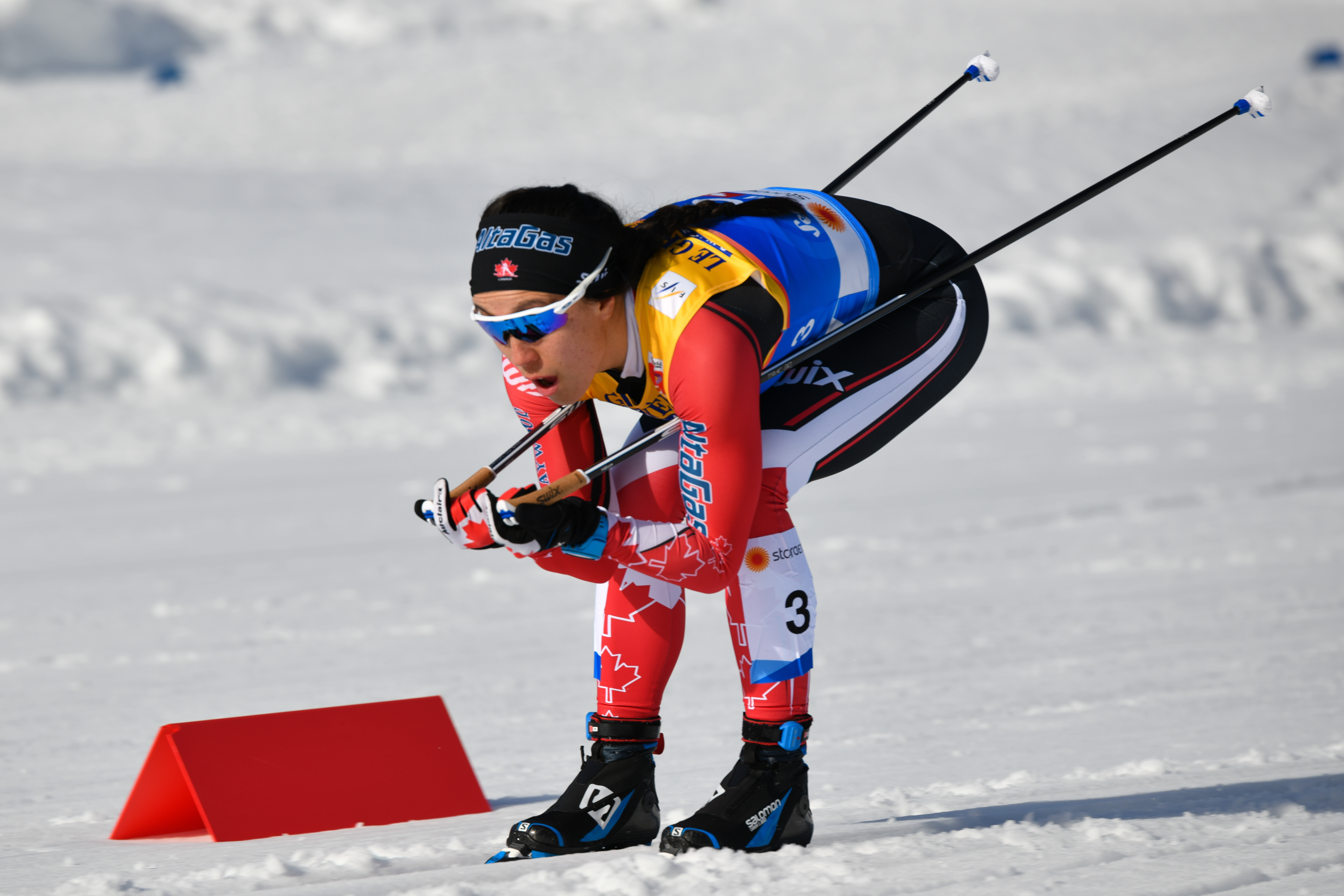

Personal information
- Nationality: Canada
- Born: 26 July 1989 (age 36) Whitehorse, Yukon, Canada
- Height: 163 cm (5 ft 4 in)

Sport
- Sport: Skiing
- Club: Whitehorse Cross Country SC

World Cup career
- Seasons: 11 – (2008–2009, 2011, 2013–2020)
- Indiv. starts: 90
- Indiv. podiums: 0
- Team starts: 3
- Team podiums: 0
- Overall titles: 0 – (65th in 2019)
- Discipline titles: 0

Emily Nishikawa (born July 26, 1989) is a Canadian former cross-country skier.

Born in Whitehorse, Yukon, Canada, Nishikawa competed at the 2014 Winter Olympics in Sochi, where she finished in 42nd in the 15k skiathlon, and in the 2018 Winter Olympics in Pyeongchang where she finished 44th in the same event. After the end of the 2019–20 World Cup season, Nishikawa announced her retirement from international skiing.

== Cross-country skiing results ==
All results are sourced from the International Ski Federation (FIS).

=== Olympic Games ===
Year	Age	10 km individual	15 km skiathlon	30 km mass start	Sprint	4 × 5 km relay	Team sprint
2014	24	—	41	45	—	13	—
2018	28	32	44	30	34	13	13

=== World Championships ===
Year	Age	10 km individual	15 km skiathlon	30 km mass start	Sprint	4 × 5 km relay	Team sprint
2013	23	57	DNF	38	57	DNF	—
2015	25	30	—	32	—	—	—
2017	27	37	38	40	—	10	—
2019	29	36	—	39	—	12	12

=== World Cup ===
==== Season standings ====
Season	Age	Season standings			Ski Tour standings				
Season	Age	Overall	Distance	Sprint	Nordic Opening	Tour de Ski	Ski Tour 2020	World Cup Final	Ski Tour Canada
2008	18	NC	NC	—	—N/a	—	—N/a	—	—N/a
2009	19	NC	—	NC	—N/a	—	—N/a	—	—N/a
2011	21	NC	NC	—	—	—	—N/a	—	—N/a
2013	23	NC	NC	NC	—	—	—N/a	46	—N/a
2014	24	NC	NC	—	—	—	—N/a	—	—N/a
2015	25	106	77	NC	47	—	—N/a	—N/a	—N/a
2016	26	NC	NC	NC	60	—	—N/a	—N/a	37
2017	27	NC	NC	NC	46	—	—N/a	38	—N/a
2018	28	NC	NC	NC	69	—	—N/a	48	—N/a
2019	29	65	55	NC	—	25	—N/a	31	—N/a
2020	30	NC	NC	NC	—	—	35	—N/a	—N/a
