= Veronika Mayerhofer =

Austrian cross-country skier

Personal information
- Nationality: Austria
- Born: 10 July 1992 (age 34) Schwarzach, Austria

Sport
- Sport: Skiing
- Club: SC Bad Gastein-Salzburg

World Cup career
- Seasons: 2013–2014
- Indiv. starts: 6
- Indiv. podiums: 0
- Team starts: 0
- Team podiums: 0
- Overall titles: 0 – (109th in 2014)
- Discipline titles: 0
- Updated on 23 January 2019

Veronika Mayerhofer (born 10 July 1992) is an Austrian cross-country skier. She competed at the FIS Nordic World Ski Championships 2013 in Val di Fiemme. She competed at the 2014 Winter Olympics in Sochi, in 10 kilometre classical, and was part of the Austrian team that placed thirteenth in the relay.

== Cross-country skiing results ==
All results are sourced from the International Ski Federation (FIS).

=== Olympic Games ===
Year	Age	10 km individual	15 km skiathlon	30 km mass start	Sprint	4 × 5 km relay	Team sprint
2014	21	45	—	—	—	12	—

=== World Cup ===
==== Season standings ====
Season	Age	Discipline standings			Ski Tour standings		
Season	Age	Overall	Distance	Sprint	Nordic Opening	Tour de Ski	World Cup Final
2013	20	NC	NC	DNF	—	DNF	—
2014	21	109	81	NC	—	—	—
