= Eva Vrabcová-Nývltová =

Czech cross-country skier and marathon runner

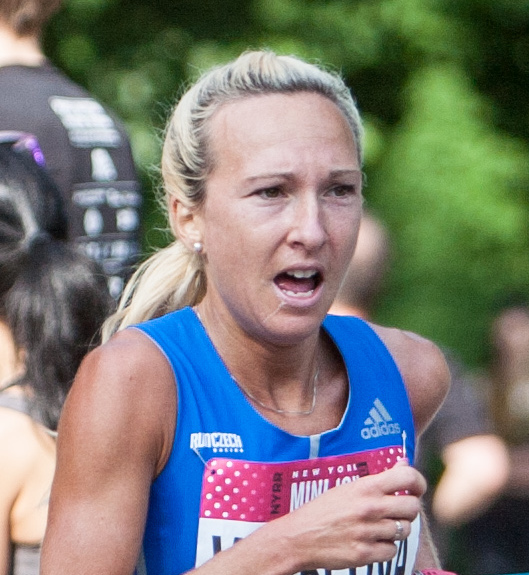
- Vrabcová-Nývltová in 2018

Personal information
- Nationality: Czech Republic
- Born: Eva Nývltová; 6 February 1986 (age 40) Trutnov, Czechoslovakia

Sport
- Sport: Skiing
- Club: Olfin Car – Vella Trutnov

World Cup career
- Seasons: 12 – (2005–2016)
- Indiv. starts: 128
- Indiv. podiums: 0
- Team starts: 10
- Team podiums: 0
- Overall titles: 0 – (14th in 2014)
- Discipline titles: 0
Medal record
Representing Czech Republic
Women's athletics
European Championships
Bronze medal – third place	2018 Berlin	Marathon
Women's cross-country skiing
Winter Universiade
Silver medal – second place	2011 Erzurum	Sprint
Junior World Championships
Silver medal – second place	2004 Stryn	4 × 5 km relay
Silver medal – second place	2006 Kranj	5 km classical
Bronze medal – third place	2005 Rovaniemi	4 × 5 km relay
Bronze medal – third place	2006 Kranj	10 km skiathlon

Eva Vrabcová-Nývltová (Czech pronunciation: [ˈɛva ˈvraptsovaː ˈniːvl̩tovaː]; born Eva Nývltová, 6 February 1986) is a Czech cross country skier and long-distance runner. A five-time Olympian, Vrabcová-Nývltová represented the Czech Republic in three Winter Olympic Games as well as twice in the Summer Olympics.

In winter sports, she won a silver medal at the 2011 Winter Universiade in the cross-country sprint competition. As a road runner, she set national records at half marathon and marathon distances, winning a bronze medal at the 2018 European Athletics Championships in the marathon.

== Cross-country skiing ==
Nývltová first competed in the Winter Olympics at the 2006 Olympics in Turin. She subsequently competed in Vancouver in 2010.

Nŷvltova competed for the Czech Republic at the 2011 Winter Universiade in the Turkish city of Erzurum. She won a silver medal in cross-country skiing in the sprint event, which was her country's first medal in Erzurum.

At the 2014 Olympics in Sochi, Vrabcová-Nŷvltova recorded her best finish of 5th in the 30 kilometre freestyle event.

Vrabcová-Nývltová's best finish at the FIS Nordic World Ski Championships was 9th, which she achieved at the FIS Nordic World Ski Championships 2015 in the 30 kilometre classical event.

== Cross-country skiing results ==
All results are sourced from the International Ski Federation (FIS).

=== Olympic Games ===
Year	Age	10 km individual	15 km skiathlon	30 km mass start	Sprint	4 × 5 km relay	Team sprint
2006	20	45	—	—	50	—	—
2010	24	54	50	39	33	12	—
2014	28	19	11	5	—	9	—

=== World Championships ===
Year	Age	10 km individual	15 km skiathlon	30 km mass start	Sprint	4 × 5 km relay	Team sprint
2005	19	56	51	—	—	—	—
2007	21	37	37	—	45	—	—
2009	23	56	—	—	46	—	—
2011	25	—	34	29	55	—	12
2013	27	41	—	26	35	12	14
2015	29	23	10	9	—	—	—

=== World Cup ===
Season standings
Season	Age	Discipline standings			Ski Tour standings			
Season	Age	Overall	Distance	Sprint	Nordic Opening	Tour de Ski	World Cup Final	Ski Tour Canada
2005	19	NC	NC	NC	—N/a	—N/a	—N/a	—N/a
2006	20	NC	NC	NC	—N/a	—N/a	—N/a	—N/a
2007	21	NC	NC	NC	—N/a	—	—N/a	—N/a
2008	22	NC	NC	NC	—N/a	—	—	—N/a
2009	23	NC	NC	NC	—N/a	DNF	—	—N/a
2010	24	67	53	91	—N/a	22	—	—N/a
2011	25	40	39	37	32	19	31	—N/a
2012	26	50	49	46	—	18	37	—N/a
2013	27	73	62	NC	41	26	—	—N/a
2014	28	14	12	61	25	8	10	—N/a
2015	29	19	18	NC	30	6	—N/a	—N/a
2016	30	NC	—	NC	DNF	—	—N/a	—

== Athletics ==
Vrabcová-Nývltová became national champion in the 10K run in September 2014, setting a new national record of 33:42 at the course of the Běchovice – Prague Race, where she finished more than two minutes ahead of nearest compatriot, Petra Kamínková. She followed this up by winning the national championship at the same course a year later in a time of 33:27, taking a further 15 seconds off the record. That same month she made her debut at half marathon distance, finishing 5th in the Ústí nad Labem Half Marathon in a time of 1:12:11, second-fastest ever for a Czech woman behind the record of Alena Peterková.

Vrabcová-Nývltová competed for the Czech Republic in the marathon at the 2016 Summer Olympics in Rio de Janeiro. She finished in 26th place with a time of 2:33:51.

After not participating in the Běchovice – Prague Race in 2016 due to fatigue from the Olympics, Vrabcová-Nývltová returned to the race in 2017, where she again won for her third title. She was named Trutnov's Sportsperson of the Year for 2017, marking the fifth time she had received the award.

On August 12, 2018, Vrabcová-Nývltová won her first major athletics medal, finishing third for a bronze medal in the women's marathon at the 2018 European Athletics Championships in Berlin. Her time in the event of 2:26:31 set a new Czech record. Also in 2018, in Prague, Vrabcová-Nývltová set a Czech national record in the half marathon of 1:11:01, a record which stood until being surpassed by Moira Stewartová in March 2022.

In 2021, Vrabcová-Nývltová competed at the marathon at the 2020 Summer Olympics in Tokyo, but did not finish the race after experiencing an injury.

She announced her retirement at the age of 37 in February 2023.

== Personal life ==
In 2012 Nývltová got married and added her husband's surname to hers, becoming Eva Vrabcová-Nývltová. She became a mother in April 2020, giving birth to a daughter in Trutnov at the age of 34.
