= Teresa Stadlober =

Austrian cross-country skier (born 1993)

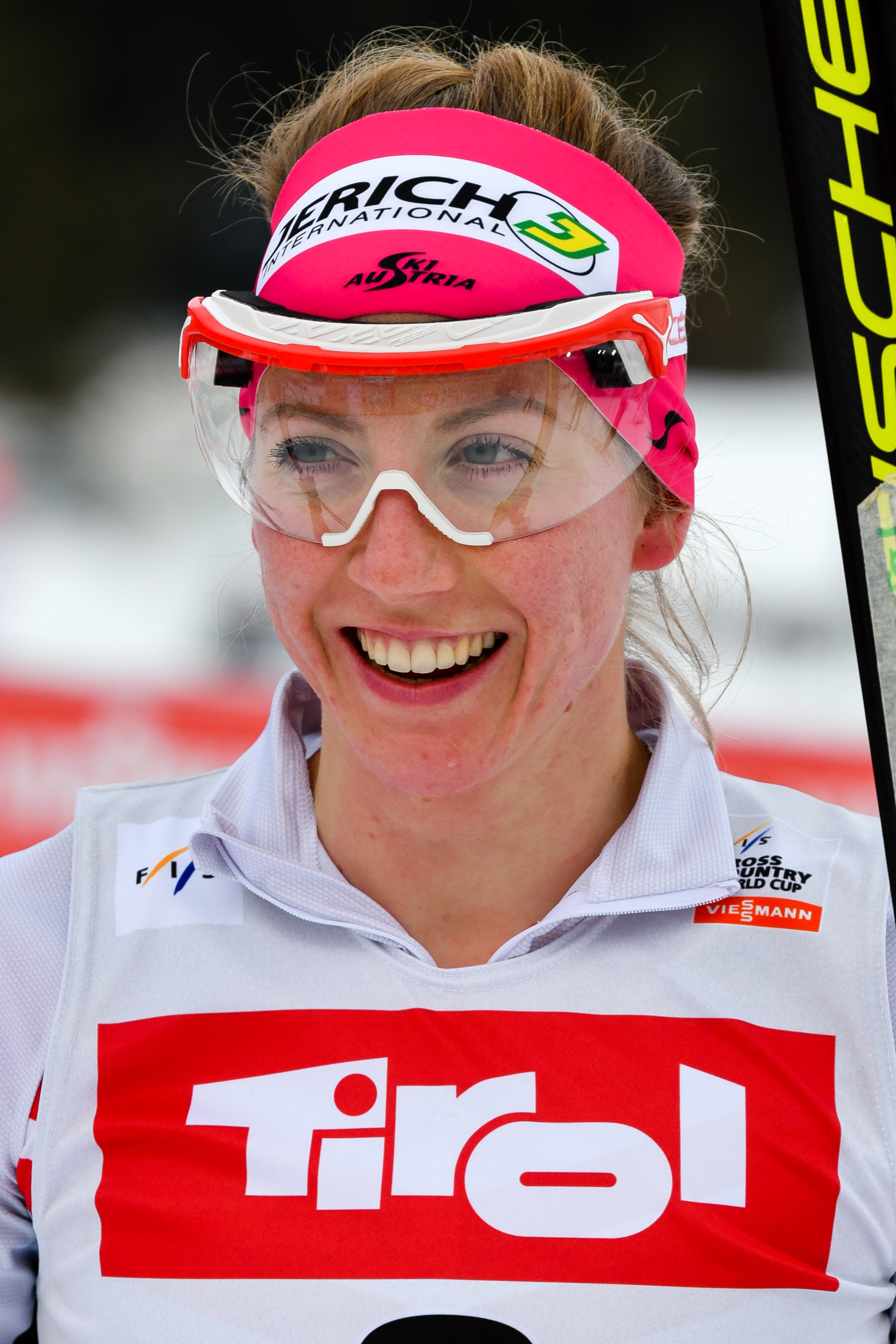
- Stadlober during FIS World Cup competitions in Seefeld, Austria in January 2018

Personal information
- Nationality: Austria
- Born: 1 February 1993 (age 33) Radstadt, Austria
- Height: 1.68 m (5 ft 6 in)

Sport
- Sport: Skiing
- Club: SC Sparkasse Radstadt-Salzburg

World Cup career
- Seasons: 13 – (2014–present)
- Indiv. starts: 250
- Indiv. podiums: 9
- Indiv. wins: 0
- Team starts: 2
- Team podiums: 0
- Overall titles: 0 – (8th in 2018)
- Discipline titles: 0
Medal record
Women's cross-country skiing
Representing Austria
Olympic Games
Bronze medal – third place	2022 Beijing	15 km skiathlon
U23 World Championships
Bronze medal – third place	2014 Val di Fiemme	15 km skiathlon
Junior World Championships
Gold medal – first place	2013 Liberec	10 km skiathlon
Silver medal – second place	2013 Liberec	5 km freestyle
- Updated on 25 January 2026

Teresa Stadlober (born 1 February 1993) is an Austrian cross-country skier. She first competed at the Winter Olympics in 2014 Winter Olympics in Sochi, in skiathlon and women's classical. She won individual Olympic medal at the 2022 Winter Olympics, in the 15 km skiathlon event.

She is the daughter of former cross-country skier Alois Stadlober and former alpine skier Roswitha Steiner, and younger sister of cross-country skier Luis Stadlober.

She placed sixth in the 50 km classical race at the 2026 Winter Olympics.

== Cross-country skiing results ==
All results are sourced from the International Ski Federation (FIS).

=== Olympic Games ===
Year	Age	10 km individual	Skiathlon	30 km mass start	Sprint	Relay	Team sprint
2014	21	—	36	20	—	12	8
2018	25	9	7	9	—	—	14
2022	29	9	Bronze	11	—	—	6
2026	33	7	9	6	—	10	—

=== World Championships ===
Year	Age	Individual	Skiathlon	Mass Start	Sprint	Relay	Team sprint
2013	20	26	29	—	—	11	—
2015	22	25	21	13	—	—	—
2017	24	12	6	8	—	—	—
2019	26	8	—	8	—	—	—
2021	28	9	4	5	—	—	—
2023	30	—	17	8	—	—	—
2025	32	4	16	11	—	—	—

=== World Cup ===
==== Season standings ====
Season	Age	Discipline standings				Ski Tour standings				
Season	Age	Overall	Distance	Sprint	U23	Nordic Opening	Tour de Ski	Ski Tour 2020	World Cup Final	Ski Tour Canada
2014	21	72	54	NC	—N/a	62	27	—N/a	—	—N/a
2015	22	28	26	NC	2nd place, silver medalist(s)	33	10	—N/a	—N/a	—N/a
2016	23	19	15	NC	3rd place, bronze medalist(s)	27	11	—N/a	—N/a	18
2017	24	12	11	NC	—N/a	15	9	—N/a	14	—N/a
2018	25	8	7	NC	—N/a	6	5	—N/a	14	—N/a
2019	26	22	12	NC	—N/a	7	DNF	—N/a	29	—N/a
2020	27	10	9	65	—N/a	16	6	11	—N/a	—N/a
2021	28	14	11	80	—N/a	16	9	—N/a	—N/a	—N/a
2022	29	17	11	NC	—N/a	—N/a	7	—N/a	—N/a	—N/a
2023	30	15	10	104	—N/a	—N/a	9	—N/a	—N/a	—N/a
2024	31	12	9	72	—N/a	—N/a	13	—N/a	—N/a	—N/a
2025	32	10	7	109	—N/a	—N/a	7	—N/a	—N/a	—N/a
2026	33	4	5	104	—N/a	—N/a	2nd place, silver medalist(s)	—N/a	—N/a	—N/a

==== Individual podiums ====
- 9 podiums – (4 WC, 5 SWC)

No.	Season	Date	Location	Race	Level	Place
1	2017–18	6 January 2018	Val di Fiemme, Italy	10 km Mass Start C	Stage World Cup	3rd
2	2017–18	7 January 2018	Val di Fiemme, Italy	9 km Pursuit F	Stage World Cup	2nd
3	2019–20	25 January 2020	Oberstdorf, Germany	7.5 km +7.5 km Skiathlon C/F	World Cup	3rd
4	2024–25	4 January 2025	Val di Fiemme, Italy	10 km +10 km Skiathlon C/F	Stage World Cup	2nd
5	2024–25	19 January 2025	Les Rousses, France	20 km Mass Start C	World Cup	3rd
6	2025–26	29 December 2025	Toblach, Italy	10 km Individual C	Stage World Cup	2nd
7	2025–26	1 January 2026	Toblach, Italy	20 km Pursuit C	Stage World Cup	3rd
8	2025–26	28 December 2025 – 4 January 2026	(Italy) Tour de Ski	Overall Standings	World Cup	2nd
9	2025–26	18 January 2026	Oberhof, Germany	10 km Individual C	World Cup	2nd
