= Natalya Zhukova =

Natalya Zhukova may refer to:

- Natalya Zhukova (volleyball) (born 1980), Kazakhstani volleyball player
- Natalya Zhukova (skier) (born 1992), Russian cross-country skier

== See also ==
- Natalia Zhukova (born 1979), Ukrainian chess grandmaster
