= Alevtina Tanygina =

Russian cross-country skier

Personal information
- Nationality: Russia
- Born: 15 December 1989 (age 36) Kuzhenersky District, Soviet Union

Sport
- Sport: Skiing

World Cup career
- Seasons: 4 – (2012, 2014–2016)
- Indiv. starts: 31
- Indiv. podiums: 0
- Team starts: 3
- Team podiums: 0
- Overall titles: 0 – (30th in 2015)
- Discipline titles: 0
Medal record
Women's cross-country skiing
Representing Russia
U23 World Championships
Silver medal – second place	2010 Hinterzarten	10 km classical

Alevtina Tanygina (born 15 December 1989) is a Russian cross-country skier. She competed in the World Cup 2015 season.

She represented Russia at the FIS Nordic World Ski Championships 2015 in Falun.

== Cross-country skiing results ==
All results are sourced from the International Ski Federation (FIS).

=== World Championships ===
Year	Age	10 km individual	15 km skiathlon	30 km mass start	Sprint	4 × 5 km relay	Team sprint
2015	25	24	14	—	—	7	—

=== World Cup ===
==== Season standings ====
Season	Age	Discipline standings			Ski Tour standings			
Season	Age	Overall	Distance	Sprint	Nordic Opening	Tour de Ski	World Cup Final	Ski Tour Canada
2012	22	80	60	NC	33	—	—	—N/a
2014	24	NC	NC	NC	—	35	—	—N/a
2015	25	30	20	NC	—	15	—N/a	—N/a
2016	26	76	48	NC	32	—	—N/a	—
