= Emma Wikén =

Swedish cross-country skier

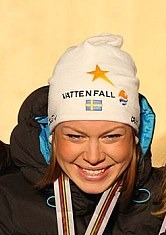
- Emma Wikén in 2013

Personal information
- Full name: Emma Christina Wikén
- Nationality: Sweden
- Born: 1 May 1989 (age 37) Berg, Sweden
- Height: 167 cm (5 ft 6 in)

Sport
- Sport: Skiing
- Club: Åsarna IK

World Cup career
- Seasons: 10 – (2010–2019)
- Indiv. starts: 103
- Indiv. podiums: 0
- Indiv. wins: 0
- Team starts: 6
- Team podiums: 1
- Team wins: 0
- Overall titles: 0 – (16th in 2015)
- Discipline titles: 0
Medal record
Women's cross-country skiing
Representing Sweden
Olympic Games
Gold medal – first place	2014 Sochi	4 × 5 km relay
World Championships
Silver medal – second place	2013 Val di Fiemme	4 × 5 km relay
U23 World Championships
Silver medal – second place	2012 Erzurum	Individual sprint
Bronze medal – third place	2012 Erzurum	15 km skiathlon
Junior World Championships
Silver medal – second place	2009 Praz de Lys-Sommand	4 × 3.33 km relay
- Updated on 31 January 2024

Emma Christina Wikén (born 1 May 1989) is a Swedish retired cross-country skier who competed in the cross-country World Cup. During the Swedish championships in skiathlon in Falun 2013, Wikén won gold. At the 2014 Winter Olympics, Wikén won gold in the 4 × 5 km relay along with Ida Ingemarsdotter, Anna Haag and Charlotte Kalla.

== Cross-country skiing results ==
All results are sourced from the International Ski Federation (FIS).

=== Olympic Games ===
- 1 medal – (1 gold)

Year	Age	10 km individual	15 km skiathlon	30 km mass start	Sprint	4 × 5 km relay	Team sprint
2014	24	11	9	8	—	Gold	—

=== World Championships ===
- 1 medal – (1 silver)

Year	Age	10 km individual	15 km skiathlon	30 km mass start	Sprint	4 × 5 km relay	Team sprint
2013	23	19	14	22	—	Silver	—
2015	25	16	19	25	—	—	—
2017	27	—	—	32	—	—	—

=== World Cup ===
==== Season standings ====
Season	Age	Discipline standings			Ski Tour standings			
Season	Age	Overall	Distance	Sprint	Nordic Opening	Tour de Ski	World Cup Final	Ski Tour Canada
2010	20	120	93	NC	—N/a	—	34	—N/a
2011	21	NC	NC	NC	—	—	39	—N/a
2012	22	83	61	—	—	—	—	—N/a
2013	23	21	20	56	—	11	21	—N/a
2014	24	21	16	NC	38	17	8	—N/a
2015	25	16	14	68	16	9	—N/a	—N/a
2016	26	67	42	NC	DNF	52	—N/a	—
2017	27	47	33	NC	—	23	33	—N/a
2018	28	36	24	NC	—	14	—	—N/a
2019	29	NC	NC	—	—	—	—	—N/a

==== Team podiums ====
- 1 podium – (1 RL)

No.	Season	Date	Location	Race	Level	Place	Teammates
1	2016–17	18 December 2016	La Clusaz, France	4 × 5 km Relay C/F	World Cup	3rd	Nilsson / Rydqvist / Dyvik

Awards
Preceded by Johan Olsson	Svenska Dagbladet Gold Medal; 2014 (with Ida Ingemarsdotter, Anna Haag & Charlotte Kalla)	Succeeded by Sarah Sjöström
