= 2012 Nordic Junior World Ski Championships =

International skiing competition

FIS Nordic Junior and U23 World Ski Championships 2012
- Host city: Erzurum, Turkey
- Events: 21
- Opening: 19 February
- Closing: 26 February

The FIS Nordic Junior and U23 World Ski Championships 2012 took place in Erzurum, Turkey from 19 February to 26 February 2012. It was the 35th Junior World Championships and the 7th Under-23 World Championships in Nordic skiing.

== Medal summary ==
=== Junior events ===
==== Cross-country skiing ====
Event	Gold		Silver		Bronze	
Men's Junior Events
Men's junior sprint free	Sergey Ustiugov; Russia		Sindre Bjørnestad Skar; Norway		Sondre Turvoll Fossli; Norway	
Men's junior 10 km classic	Sergey Ustiugov; Russia	25:24.7	Ermil Vokuev; Russia	25:47.2	Sindre Bjørnestad Skar; Norway	25:57.1
Men's junior 20 km skiathlon	Sergey Ustiugov; Russia	50:28.8	Artem Maltsev; Russia	50:39.5	Sindre Bjørnestad Skar; Norway	50:53.4
Men's junior 4 × 5 km relay	Russia; Artem Maltsev; Ermil Vokuev; Dmitriy Rostovtsev; Sergey Ustiugov	47:18.2	Kazakhstan; Daulet Rakhimbayev; Sergey Malyshev; Nikita Tkachenko; Roman Ragozin	48:03.0	Norway; Sondre Turvoll Fossli; Martin Løwstrøm Nyenget; Håvard Solås Taugbøl; Sindre Bjørnestad Skar	48:17.6
Ladies' Junior Events
Ladies' junior sprint free	Stina Nilsson; Sweden		Evelina Settlin; Sweden		Christa Jäger; Switzerland	
Ladies' junior 5 km classic	Natalya Zhukova; Russia	14:53.1	Elena Soboleva; Russia	14:53.9	Elena Serokhvostova; Russia	14:58.6
Ladies' junior 10 km skiathlon	Nika Razinger; Slovenia	29:33.3	Lea Einfalt; Slovenia	29:41.1	Nadezhda Shuniaeva; Russia	29:46.6
Ladies' junior 4 × 3.33 km relay	Russia; Elena Serokhvostova; Natalya Zhukova; Nadezhda Shuniaeva; Elena Soboleva	34:06.1	Sweden; Evelina Settlin; Sofia Henriksson; Jonna Sundling; Stina Nilsson	34:19.5	Slovenia; Anja Eržen; Anamarija Lampič; Lea Einfalt; Nika Razinger	34:19.6

==== Nordic Combined ====
Event	Gold		Silver		Bronze	
Normal hill/10 km	Mattia Runggaldier; Italy	26:50.8	Manuel Faisst; Germany	26:57.3	Michael Schuller; Germany	27:00.6
Team normal hill/4 × 5 km	Austria; David Pommer; Franz-Josef Rehrl; Alexander Brandner; Philipp Orter	51:16.9	Italy; Samuel Costa; Roberto Tomio; Manuel Maierhofer; Mattia Runggaldier	51:31.0	Germany; Christian Arlt; Tobias Simon; Michael Schuller; Manuel Faisst	51:52.2
Normal hill/5 km	Øystein Granbu Lien; Norway	12:52.9	Ilkka Herola; Finland	13:03.1	Espen Andersen; Norway	13:08.9

==== Ski jumping ====
Event	Gold		Silver		Bronze	
Men's Junior Events
Men's junior individual normal hill	Nejc Dežman; Slovenia	286.5	Aleksander Zniszczoł; Poland; Jaka Hvala; Slovenia	280.5 280.5	Not awarded	
Men's junior team normal hill	Norway; Espen Røe; Mats Søhagen Berggaard; Simen Key Grimsrud; Phillip Sjøen	988.5	Poland; Klemens Murańka; Tomasz Byrt; Bartlomiej Klusek; Aleksander Zniszczoł	985.5	Austria; Christoph Stauder; Ulrich Wohlgenannt; Stefan Kraft; Lukas Müller	960.0
Ladies' Junior Events
Ladies' junior individual normal hill	Sara Takanashi; Japan	276.5	Sarah Hendrickson; United States	265.0	Carina Vogt; Germany	255.5
Ladies' junior team normal hill	Japan; Yuki Ito; Yurina Yamada; Kaori Iwabuchi; Sara Takanashi	968.0	Germany; Ramona Straub; Svenja Würth; Katharina Althaus; Carina Vogt	848.5	Slovenia; Urša Bogataj; Barbara Klinec; Špela Rogelj; Katja Požun	823.5

=== Under-23 events ===
==== Cross-country skiing ====
Event	Gold		Silver		Bronze	
Men's Under-23 Events
Men's under-23 sprint free	Gleb Retivykh; Russia		Evgeniy Belov; Russia		Roman Furger; Switzerland	
Men's under-23 15 kilometre classic	Evgeniy Belov; Russia	37:40.1	Noah Hoffman; United States	38:05.5	Hannes Dotzler; Germany	38:09.1
Men's under-23 30 kilometre skiathlon	Raul Shakirzianov; Russia	1:16:30.9	Evgeniy Belov; Russia	1:16:31.8	Hannes Dotzler; Germany	1:16:32.0
Ladies' Under-23 Events
Ladies' under-23 sprint free	Hanna Kolb; Germany		Emma Wikén; Sweden		Jennie Öberg; Sweden	
Ladies' under-23 10 kilometre classic	Mariya Guschina; Russia	29:23.2	Polina Medvedeva; Russia	29:49.9	Martine Ek Hagen; Norway	29:51.2
Ladies' under-23 15 kilometre skiathlon	Martine Ek Hagen; Norway	43:52.5	Debora Agreiter; Italy	44:06.4	Emma Wikén; Sweden	44:27.0

=== Medal table ===
Rank	Nation	Gold	Silver	Bronze	Total
1	Russia (RUS)	10	6	2	18
2	Norway (NOR)	3	1	6	10
3	Slovenia (SLO)	2	2	2	6
4	Japan (JPN)	2	0	0	2
5	Sweden (SWE)	1	3	2	6
6	Germany (GER)	1	2	5	8
7	Italy (ITA)	1	2	0	3
8	Austria (AUT)	1	0	1	2
9	Poland (POL)	0	2	0	2
9	United States (USA)	0	2	0	2
11	Finland (FIN)	0	1	0	1
11	Kazakhstan (KAZ)	0	1	0	1
13	Switzerland (SUI)	0	0	2	2
Totals (13 entries)		21	22	20	63
