= Kornelia Kubińska =

Polish cross-country skier

Personal information
- Nationality: Poland
- Born: 3 August 1985 (age 40) Wodzisław Śląski - Marklowice, Polish People's Republic

Sport
- Sport: Skiing
- Club: AZS-AWF Katowice

World Cup career
- Seasons: 7 – (2008–2010, 2013–2015, 2017)
- Indiv. starts: 66
- Indiv. podiums: 0
- Team starts: 8
- Team podiums: 0
- Overall titles: 0 – (66th in 2015)
- Discipline titles: 0

Kornelia Kubińska (née Marek, born 3 August 1985 in Marklowice, Wodzisław Śląski) is a Polish cross country skier who between from 2002 and 2017. At the 2010 Winter Olympics in Vancouver, she finished sixth in the 4 × 5 km relay, ninth in the team sprint, 11th in the 30 km, 35th in the 7.5 km + 7.5 km double pursuit, and 39th in the 10 km events.

At the FIS Nordic World Ski Championships 2009 in Liberec, Kubińska finished sixth in the 4 × 5 km relay, 21st in the 30 km, 29th in the 10 km, 40th in the 7.5 km + 7.5 km double pursuit, and 66th in the individual sprint events.

Her best career finish was ninth in a 4 × 5 km relay in France in 2008 while her best individual finish was 23rd at a 10 km event in Estonia in January 2010.

On 11 March 2010 it was reported that Kubińska was tested positive for erythropoietin by the Polish Olympic Committee. If found guilty of doping by the International Olympic Committee, Kubińska and the relay teams would be disqualified and stripped of their Vancouver results. She would also be banned from the next Winter Olympics in Sochi, Russia, in 2014. On 7 April 2010, it was announced that she will be banned from all competitions for two years.

== Cross-country skiing results ==
All results are sourced from the International Ski Federation (FIS).

=== Olympic Games ===
Year	Age	10 km individual	15 km skiathlon	30 km mass start	Sprint	4 × 5 km relay	Team sprint
2010	24	DSQ	DSQ	DSQ	—	DSQ	—
2014	28	24	33	41	—	6	—

=== World Championships ===
Year	Age	10 km individual	15 km skiathlon	30 km mass start	Sprint	4 × 5 km relay	Team sprint
2009	23	29	39	20	66	6	—
2013	27	37	23	23	54	9	—
2015	29	41	24	DNF	34	5	—
2017	31	40	37	24	—	8	—

=== World Cup ===
==== Season standings ====
Season	Age	Discipline standings			Ski Tour standings		
Season	Age	Overall	Distance	Sprint	Nordic Opening	Tour de Ski	World Cup Final
2008	22	91	60	NC	—N/a	—	56
2009	23	125	90	NC	—N/a	—	39
2010	24	103	79	NC	—N/a	—	—
2013	27	NC	NC	NC	52	37	—
2014	28	107	78	NC	40	DNF	—
2015	29	66	65	NC	55	21	—N/a
2017	31	NC	NC	—	—	—	—
