= Liz Stephen =

American cross-country skier

Personal information
- Full name: Elizabeth Stephen
- Nationality: United States
- Born: 12 January 1987 (age 39) Barre, Vermont, United States

Sport
- Sport: Skiing
- Club: Burke Mountain Academy

World Cup career
- Seasons: 11 – (2007, 2009–2018)
- Indiv. starts: 173
- Indiv. podiums: 6
- Indiv. wins: 0
- Team starts: 13
- Team podiums: 4
- Team wins: 0
- Overall titles: 0 – (10th in 2015)
- Discipline titles: 0
Medal record
Women's cross-country skiing
Representing United States
U23 World Championships
Bronze medal – third place	2008 Mals	15 km freestyle

Elizabeth Stephen (born January 12, 1987, in East Montpelier, Vermont) is a retired American cross-country skier who competed between 2005 and 2018.

== Career ==
At the FIS Nordic World Ski Championships 2009 in Liberec, Stephen had her best finish of 14th in the 4 x 5 km relay and her best individual finish of 15th in the 7.5 km + 7.5 km double pursuit.

It was announced on 19 January 2010 that she had qualified for the 2010 Winter Olympics where she finished 50th in the 10 km and 58th in the 15 km mixed pursuit.

At the FIS Nordic World Ski Championships 2011 in Oslo, Stephen finished 16th in the Women's 30 kilometre Freestyle, as the first of the four Americans in the class, with a time of 1:30:07.

Stephen was named to the U.S. team for the 2014 Winter Olympics. In the 15 kilometer skiathlon, she placed 12th (out of 61 competitors) with a time of 40:09.6.

In the 2015 Tour de Ski, she finished 5th in the overall ranking, also recording her best World Cup performance.

She announced her retirement from cross-country skiing in April 2018.

== Cross-country skiing results ==
All results are sourced from the International Ski Federation (FIS).

=== Olympic Games ===
Year	Age	10 km individual	15 km skiathlon	30 km mass start	Sprint	4 × 5 km relay	Team sprint
2010	23	49	57	—	—	—	—
2014	27	—	12	24	—	8	—
2018	31	30	—	—	—	—	—

=== World Championships ===
Year	Age	10 km individual	15 km skiathlon	30 km mass start	Sprint	4 × 5 km relay	Team sprint
2009	22	—	49	17	39	13	—
2011	24	—	24	16	—	9	—
2013	26	5	20	16	—	4	—
2015	28	10	11	11	—	4	—
2017	30	—	20	25	—	4	—

=== World Cup ===
==== Season standings ====
Season	Age	Discipline standings			Ski Tour standings			
Season	Age	Overall	Distance	Sprint	Nordic Opening	Tour de Ski	World Cup Final	Ski Tour Canada
2007	20	NC	NC	—	—N/a	—	—N/a	—N/a
2009	22	106	79	NC	—N/a	—	—	—N/a
2010	23	NC	NC	NC	—N/a	—	—	—N/a
2011	24	81	59	NC	47	—	—	—N/a
2012	25	42	28	NC	35	24	18	—N/a
2013	26	20	15	71	17	15	16	—N/a
2014	27	17	15	62	32	7	17	—N/a
2015	28	10	7	NC	29	5	—N/a	—N/a
2016	29	33	28	NC	59	19	—N/a	DNF
2017	30	28	22	75	38	14	—	—N/a
2018	31	52	44	NC	56	16	50	—N/a

==== Individual podiums ====
- 6 podiums – (2 WC, 4 SWC)

No.	Season	Date	Location	Race	Level	Place
1	2012–13	6 January 2013	Val di Fiemme, Italy	9 km Pursuit F	Stage World Cup	2nd
2	2013–14	5 January 2014	Val di Fiemme, Italy	9 km Pursuit F	Stage World Cup	3rd
3	2014–15	23 January 2015	Rybinsk, Russia	10 km Individual F	World Cup	2nd
4	2015–16	10 January 2016	Val di Fiemme, Italy	9 km Pursuit F	Stage World Cup	3rd
5	2016–17	8 January 2017	Val di Fiemme, Italy	9 km Pursuit F	Stage World Cup	2nd
6	2016–17	2 February 2017	Pyeongchang, South Korea	7.5 km + 7.5 km Skiathlon C/F	World Cup	2nd

==== Team podiums ====
- 4 podiums – (4 RL)

No.	Season	Date	Location	Race	Level	Place	Teammates
1	2012–13	25 November 2012	Gällivare, Sweden	4 × 5 km Relay C/F	World Cup	3rd	Brooks / Randall / Diggins
2	2013–14	8 December 2013	Lillehammer, Norway	4 × 5 km Relay C/F	World Cup	3rd	Randall / Bjornsen / Diggins
3	2015–16	6 December 2015	Lillehammer, Norway	4 × 5 km Relay C/F	World Cup	3rd	Brennan / Bjornsen / Diggins
4	2015–16	24 January 2016	Nové Město, Czech Republic	4 × 5 km Relay C/F	World Cup	2nd	Caldwell / Bjornsen / Diggins
