= FIS Nordic World Ski Championships 2015 – Women's 30 kilometre classical =

Women's 30 kilometre classical at the FIS Nordic World Ski Championships 2015
- Date: 28 February 2015
- Competitors: 49 from 22 nations
- Winning time: 1:24:47.0

Medalists
| gold medal | Therese Johaug | Norway |
| silver medal | Marit Bjørgen | Norway |
| bronze medal | Charlotte Kalla | Sweden |

The Women's 30 kilometre classical event of the FIS Nordic World Ski Championships 2015 was held on 28 February 2015.

== Results ==
The race was started at 13:00.

| Rank | Bib | Athlete | Country | Time | Deficit |
|---|---|---|---|---|---|
| 1st place, gold medalist(s) | 2 | Therese Johaug | Norway | 1:24:47.0 | |
| 2nd place, silver medalist(s) | 1 | Marit Bjørgen | Norway | 1:25:39.3 | +52.3 |
| 3rd place, bronze medalist(s) | 8 | Charlotte Kalla | Sweden | 1:26:18.6 | +1:31.6 |
| 4 | 10 | Kerttu Niskanen | Finland | 1:26:42.2 | +1:55.2 |
| 5 | 22 | Sofia Bleckur | Sweden | 1:26:56.3 | +2:09.3 |
| 6 | 6 | Stefanie Böhler | Germany | 1:27:23.9 | +2:36.9 |
| 7 | 21 | Aino-Kaisa Saarinen | Finland | 1:27:32.2 | +2:45.2 |
| 8 | 3 | Heidi Weng | Norway | 1:27:32.7 | +2:45.7 |
| 9 | 17 | Eva Vrabcová-Nývltová | Czech Republic | 1:27:39.4 | +2:52.4 |
| 10 | 12 | Ingvild Flugstad Østberg | Norway | 1:27:48.1 | +3:01.1 |
| 11 | 5 | Liz Stephen | United States | 1:27:49.4 | +3:02.4 |
| 12 | 9 | Martine Ek Hagen | Norway | 1:28:00.8 | +3:13.8 |
| 13 | 18 | Teresa Stadlober | Austria | 1:28:07.7 | +3:20.7 |
| 14 | 14 | Anna Haag | Sweden | 1:28:20.7 | +3:33.7 |
| 15 | 26 | Seraina Boner | Switzerland | 1:28:24.0 | +3:37.0 |
| 16 | 29 | Rosie Brennan | United States | 1:28:42.9 | +3:55.9 |
| 17 | 7 | Justyna Kowalczyk | Poland | 1:28:43.0 | +3:56.0 |
| 18 | 13 | Riitta-Liisa Roponen | Finland | 1:29:16.1 | +4:29.1 |
| 19 | 24 | Masako Ishida | Japan | 1:29:26.9 | +4:39.9 |
| 20 | 15 | Sadie Bjornsen | United States | 1:29:51.6 | +5:04.6 |
| 21 | 19 | Anne Kyllönen | Finland | 1:30:04.6 | +5:17.6 |
| 22 | 23 | Natalya Zhukova | Russia | 1:30:16.0 | +5:29.0 |
| 23 | 25 | Nathalie von Siebenthal | Switzerland | 1:30:36.8 | +5:49.8 |
| 24 | 33 | Virginia De Martin Topranin | Italy | 1:30:48.8 | +6:01.8 |
| 25 | 11 | Emma Wikén | Sweden | 1:31:10.0 | +6:23.0 |
| 26 | 34 | Anastasia Dotsenko | Russia | 1:31:17.2 | +6:30.2 |
| 27 | 20 | Célia Aymonier | France | 1:31:52.2 | +7:05.2 |
| 28 | 28 | Olga Kuzyukova | Russia | 1:32:18.3 | +7:31.3 |
| 29 | 35 | Victoria Carl | Germany | 1:32:26.6 | +7:39.6 |
| 30 | 30 | Yuki Kobayashi | Japan | 1:32:29.2 | +7:42.2 |
| 31 | 37 | Laura Orgué | Spain | 1:33:19.6 | +8:32.6 |
| 32 | 38 | Emily Nishikawa | Canada | 1:33:28.2 | +8:41.2 |
| 33 | 36 | Valentyna Shevchenko | Ukraine | 1:33:40.4 | +8:53.4 |
| 34 | 27 | Francesca Baudin | Italy | 1:33:52.8 | +9:05.8 |
| 35 | 31 | Nathalie Schwarz | Austria | 1:34:32.3 | +9:45.3 |
| 36 | 32 | Natalya Ilyina | Russia | 1:35:16.7 | +10:29.7 |
| 37 | 41 | Elena Kolomina | Kazakhstan | 1:37:06.6 | +12:19.6 |
| 38 | 44 | Karolína Grohová | Czech Republic | 1:37:20.9 | +12:33.9 |
| 39 | 43 | Olga Mandrika | Kazakhstan | 1:38:04.6 | +13:17.6 |
| 40 | 42 | Yulia Tikhonova | Belarus | 1:38:33.4 | +13:46.4 |
| 41 | 40 | Anna Shevchenko | Kazakhstan | 1:40:06.4 | +15:19.4 |
| 42 | 47 | Kateryna Grygorenko | Ukraine | 1:40:19.1 | +15:32.1 |
| 43 | 51 | Chi Chunxue | China | 1:41:19.3 | +16:32.3 |
| 44 | 48 | Anna Stoyan | Kazakhstan | 1:42:04.8 | +17:17.8 |
| 45 | 46 | Laura Alba | Estonia | 1:47:16.9 | +22:29.9 |
| 46 | 52 | Anda Muižniece | Latvia | 1:52:30.0 | +27:43.0 |
| 47 | 50 | Casey Weight | Australia | 1:59:02.7 | +34:15.7 |
| | 16 | Jessie Diggins | United States | DNF | |
| | 39 | Kornelia Kubińska | Poland | DNF | |
| | 4 | Nicole Fessel | Germany | DNS | |
| | 45 | Jessica Yeaton | Australia | DNS | |
| | 49 | Aimee Watson | Australia | DNS | |
