= Iryna Leletko =

Ukrainian cross-country skier (born 1993)

Personal information
- Full name: Iryna Leletko
- Born: 16 April 1993 (age 33) Ukraine

Sport
- Sport: Skiing
- Updated on 21 February 2013

Iryna Leletko (born 16 April 1993) is a cross-country skier from Ukraine.

== Performances ==
Level	Year	Event	SP	IS	PU	MS	TS	R
NJWSC	2013	Liberec, Czech Republic	53	24	48			12
NWSC	2013	Val di Fiemme, Italy	77			LAP	19	
