= Nathalie Schwarz =

Austrian cross-country skier

Personal information
- Nationality: Austria
- Born: 29 July 1993 (age 32) Linz, Austria

Sport
- Sport: Skiing
- Club: SU Raika Zwettl

World Cup career
- Seasons: 2014–2017
- Indiv. starts: 34
- Indiv. podiums: 0
- Team starts: 1
- Team podiums: 0
- Overall titles: 0 – (64th in 2015)
- Discipline titles: 0
- Updated on 22 January 2019

Nathalie Schwarz (born 29 July 1993) is an Austrian cross-country skier. She competed at the 2014 Winter Olympics in Sochi, in 10 kilometre classical, was part of the Austrian team that placed thirteenth in the relay, and competed in the women's sprint.

== Cross-country skiing results ==
All results are sourced from the International Ski Federation (FIS).

=== Olympic Games ===
Year	Age	10 km individual	15 km skiathlon	30 km mass start	Sprint	4 × 5 km relay	Team sprint
2014	20	36	—	—	52	12	—

=== World Cup ===
==== Season standings ====
Season	Age	Discipline standings				Ski Tour standings			
Season	Age	Overall	Distance	Sprint	U23	Nordic Opening	Tour de Ski	World Cup Final	Ski Tour Canada
2014	20	105	76	NC	—N/a	—	DNF	—	—N/a
2015	21	64	64	NC	7	—	20	—N/a	—N/a
2016	22	84	58	NC	20	—	31	—N/a	—
2017	23	NC	NC	NC	—N/a	—	DNF	—	—N/a
