= Cross-country skiing at the 2014 Winter Olympics – Women's 4 × 5 kilometre relay =

Women's 4 × 5 kilometre relay at the XXII Olympic Winter Games
- Venue: Laura Biathlon & Ski Complex
- Dates: 15 February 2014
- Competitors: 56 from 14 nations
- Teams: 14
- Winning time: 53:02.7

Medalists
1st place, gold medalist(s)		Ida Ingemarsdotter; Emma Wikén; Anna Haag; Charlotte Kalla	Sweden
2nd place, silver medalist(s)		Anne Kyllönen; Aino-Kaisa Saarinen; Kerttu Niskanen; Krista Lähteenmäki	Finland
3rd place, bronze medalist(s)		Nicole Fessel; Stefanie Böhler; Claudia Nystad; Denise Herrmann	Germany

The women's 4 × 5 kilometre relay cross-country skiing competition at the 2014 Sochi Olympics took place on 15 February at Laura Biathlon & Ski Complex. Sweden won the event. This became the first gold medal in the women's relay for Sweden since the 1960 Winter Olympics. Finland won the silver medals, and Germany finished third.

Gold medals won in this event featured a fragment from the Chelyabinsk meteor, to commemorate the first anniversary of the meteor strike.

== Results ==
The race was started at 14:00.

In November 2017, Yuliya Ivanova was disqualified from the event meaning that the whole Russian team was also disqualified. In September 2018, Marina Piller was disqualified for doping, and all her 2014 Olympic results were annulled, including the result of the Italian relay team.

Rank	Bib	Nation	Time	Deficit
1st place, gold medalist(s)	2	Sweden; Ida Ingemarsdotter; Emma Wikén; Anna Haag; Charlotte Kalla	53:02.7; 14:09.8; 14:02.3; 12:40.2; 12:10.4	
2nd place, silver medalist(s)	5	Finland; Anne Kyllönen; Aino-Kaisa Saarinen; Kerttu Niskanen; Krista Lähteenmäki	53:03.2; 14:21.2; 13:51.3; 12:14.1; 12:36.6	+0.5
3rd place, bronze medalist(s)	7	Germany; Nicole Fessel; Stefanie Böhler; Claudia Nystad; Denise Herrmann	53:03.6; 14:13.4; 13:59.9; 12:19.1; 12:31.2	+0.9
4	6	France; Aurore Jéan; Célia Aymonier; Anouk Faivre-Picon; Coraline Hugue	53:47.7; 14:12.1; 14:13.8; 12:34.5; 12:47.3	+45.0
5	1	Norway; Heidi Weng; Therese Johaug; Astrid Uhrenholdt Jacobsen; Marit Bjørgen	53:56.3; 14:12.0; 14:13.5; 12:34.5; 12:56.3	+53.6
6	9	Poland; Kornelia Kubińska; Justyna Kowalczyk; Sylwia Jaśkowiec; Paulina Maciuszek	54:38.9; 14:37.4; 13:47.7; 12:34.2; 13:39.6	+1:36.2
7	4	United States; Kikkan Randall; Sadie Bjornsen; Liz Stephen; Jessie Diggins	55:33.4; 14:45.2; 14:31.8; 12:44.2; 13:32.2	+2:30.7
8	12	Czech Republic; Eva Vrabcová-Nývltová; Karolina Grohová; Petra Novaková; Klara Moravcová	56:29.8; 14:06.1; 15:25.3; 13:06.4; 13:52.0	+3:27.1
9	13	Slovenia; Alenka Čebašek; Katja Višnar; Barbara Jezeršek; Vesna Fabjan	56:37.0; 14:18.2; 15:39.1; 12:56.1; 13:43.6	+3:34.3
10	10	Ukraine; Tetyana Antypenko; Valentyna Shevchenko; Maryna Antsybor; Kateryna Grygorenko	56:56.1; 15:10.6; 14:55.4; 13:01.7; 13:48.4	+3:53.4
11	11	Austria; Kateřina Smutná; Nathalie Schwarz; Teresa Stadlober; Veronika Mayerhofer	57:04.7; 14:20.3; 15:36.8; 13:08.7; 13:58.9	+4:02.0
12	14	Canada; Perianne Jones; Daria Gaiazova; Emily Nishikawa; Brittany Webster	59:13.6; 15:50.9; 15:09.5; 13:27.3; 14:45.9	+6:10.9
DSQ	3	Russia; Yuliya Ivanova; Olga Kuzyukova; Natalya Zhukova; Yuliya Chekalyova	~~54:06.3~~; 14:05.5; 14:37.2; 12:34.9; 12:48.7	~~+1:03.6~~
DSQ	8	Italy; Virginia De Martin Topranin; Elisa Brocard; Marina Piller; Ilaria Debertolis	~~55:19.9~~; 14:26.9; 14:49.4; 12:42.9; 13:20.7	~~+2:17.2~~

== Flower and medal ceremonies ==
Immediately after the race a flower ceremony was held at the ski stadium, where the medalist received flowers on the podium. The next day the medal ceremony was held in Sochi, where the gold medals was handed out by International Olympic Committee member Gunilla Lindberg and flowers handed out by International Ski Federation Cross-Country Committee chairman Vegard Ulvang, after which the Swedish national anthem was played for the gold medal team on the podium.
