= Anda Muižniece =

Latvian cross-country skier (born 1991)

Anda Muizhniece
Personal information
- Nationality: Latvia
- Born: 20 November 1991 (age 34)

Sport
- Sport: Skiing
- Club: SK Vietalva

Anda Muizhniece (born 20 November 1991) is a Latvian cross-country skier who competes internationally.

She competed for Latvia at the FIS Nordic World Ski Championships 2017 in Lahti, Finland.
