= Cross-country skiing at the 2014 Winter Olympics – Women's 15 kilometre skiathlon =

Women's 15 kilometre skiathlon at the XXII Olympic Winter Games
- Venue: Laura Biathlon & Ski Complex
- Dates: 8 February 2014
- Competitors: 61 from 24 nations
- Winning time: 38:33.6

Medalists
1st place, gold medalist(s)		Marit Bjørgen	Norway
2nd place, silver medalist(s)		Charlotte Kalla	Sweden
3rd place, bronze medalist(s)		Heidi Weng	Norway

The women's 15 kilometre skiathlon cross-country skiing competition at the 2014 Sochi Olympics took place at 14:00 (MSK) on 8 February 2014 at Laura Biathlon & Ski Complex.

The defending champion was Marit Bjørgen from Norway, who also became the 2014 Olympic champion. The 2010 silver medalist Anna Haag did not participate, and the 2010 bronze medalist, Justyna Kowalczyk, finished sixth. Charlotte Kalla from Sweden became the silver medalist, and Heidi Weng from Norway took bronze.

A large group of skiers kept together at the classical part of the course, but in the free skiing part soon a group of five skiers took the lead. The group included Bjørgen, Kalla, Weng, Therese Johaug, and Aino-Kaisa Saarinen. Shortly before the finish, Kalla escaped but was overtaken by Bjørgen at the finish line.

== Qualification ==
An athlete with a maximum of 100 FIS distance points (the A standard) was allowed to compete in both or one of the event (sprint/distance). An athlete with a maximum 120 FIS sprint points was allowed to compete in the sprint event and 10 km for women or 15 km for men provided their distance points did not exceed 300 FIS points. NOC's who do not have any athlete meeting the A standard could enter one competitor of each sex (known as the basic quota) in only 10 km classical event for women or 15 km classical event for men. They must have had a maximum of 300 FIS distance points at the end of qualifying on 20 January 2014. The qualification period began in July 2012.

== Competition schedule ==
All times are (UTC+4).

Date	Time	Event
8 February	14:00	Final

== Results ==
The race was started at 14:00.

Rank	Bib	Name	Country	7.5 km C	Rank	Pitstop	7.5 km F	Rank	Finish time	Deficit
1st place, gold medalist(s)	2	Marit Bjørgen	Norway	19:10.6	1	35.1	18:47.9	1	38:33.6	—
2nd place, silver medalist(s)	6	Charlotte Kalla	Sweden	19:11.6	3	33.5	18:50.3	2	38:35.4	+1.8
3rd place, bronze medalist(s)	4	Heidi Weng	Norway	19:12.0	4	33.7	19:01.1	4	38:46.8	+13.2
4	1	Therese Johaug	Norway	19:11.5	2	35.7	19:01.0	3	38:48.2	+14.6
5	9	Aino-Kaisa Saarinen	Finland	19:12.4	5	34.2	19:02.3	5	38:48.9	+15.3
6	3	Justyna Kowalczyk	Poland	19:12.9	6	39.6	19:37.2	9	39:29.7	+56.1
7	5	Kerttu Niskanen	Finland	19:17.4	7	32.0	19:45.9	12	39:35.3	+1:01.7
8	15	Jessie Diggins	United States	20:01.7	25	34.3	19:29.5	8	40:05.5	+1:31.9
9	27	Emma Wikén	Sweden	19:48.5	14	33.8	19:44.9	11	40:07.2	+1:33.6
10	13	Masako Ishida	Japan	19:24.4	8	34.3	20:09.6	25	40:08.3	+1:34.7
11	14	Eva Vrabcová-Nývltová	Czech Republic	19:51.0	16	33.7	19:44.1	10	40:08.8	+1:35.2
12	12	Liz Stephen	United States	20:14.7	29	32.7	19:22.2	7	40:09.6	+1:36.0
13	7	Krista Lähteenmäki	Finland	19:27.6	10	34.6	20:07.7	22	40:09.9	+1:36.3
14	26	Nicole Fessel	Germany	19:24.8	9	37.3	20:09.3	24	40:11.4	+1:37.8
15	31	Natalya Zhukova	Russia	19:48.2	13	35.1	19:52.2	13	40:15.5	+1:41.9
16	20	Aurore Jéan	France	19:55.2	18	34.6	19:57.3	14	40:27.1	+1:53.5
17	37	Barbara Jezeršek	Slovenia	19:48.9	15	34.8	20:05.8	20	40:29.5	+1:55.9
18	19	Sara Lindborg	Sweden	19:56.1	19	34.7	20:01.6	17	40:32.4	+1:58.8
19	33	Célia Aymonier	France	20:00.0	23	35.1	19:57.5	15	40:32.6	+1:59.0
20	24	Coraline Hugue	France	20:41.1	43	34.5	19:17.5	6	40:33.1	+1:59.5
21	11	Kristin Størmer Steira	Norway	19:54.2	17	34.8	20:06.5	21	40:35.5	+2:01.9
22	21	Olga Kuzyukova	Russia	19:39.2	12	35.0	20:29.0	32	40:43.2	+2:09.6
23	38	Laura Orgué	Spain	20:07.6	27	34.1	20:04.8	18	40:46.5	+2:12.9
24	16	Katrin Zeller	Germany	19:57.6	21	35.4	20:16.7	27	40:49.7	+2:16.1
25	30	Valentyna Shevchenko	Ukraine	20:17.0	32	33.1	20:00.6	16	40:50.7	+2:17.1
26	25	Irina Khazova	Russia	20:04.9	26	38.9	20:16.5	26	41:00.3	+2:26.7
27	41	Paulina Maciuszek	Poland	20:15.0	30	36.4	20:09.2	23	41:00.6	+2:27.0
28	32	Debora Agreiter	Italy	20:25.4	38	34.5	20:04.9	19	41:04.8	+2:31.2
29	23	Sadie Bjornsen	United States	19:56.8	20	35.9	20:37.0	34	41:09.7	+2:36.1
30	36	Elisa Brocard	Italy	20:20.3	34	34.3	20:18.0	28	41:12.6	+2:39.0
31	10	Anne Kyllönen	Finland	19:30.3	11	35.7	21:12.9	45	41:18.9	+2:45.3
32	56	Kornelia Kubińska	Poland	20:23.5	37	35.2	20:20.7	29	41:19.4	+2:45.8
33	17	Stefanie Böhler	Germany	20:00.8	24	39.5	20:39.7	35	41:20.0	+2:46.4
34	43	Petra Novaková	Czech Republic	20:16.5	31	38.2	20:26.0	31	41:20.7	+2:47.1
35	35	Teresa Stadlober	Austria	20:35.7	40	38.6	20:24.5	30	41:38.8	+3:05.2
36	28	Anouk Faivre-Picon	France	20:21.2	35	34.7	20:48.5	38	41:44.4	+3:10.8
37	39	Britta Johansson Norgren	Sweden	19:59.3	22	34.5	21:17.2	46	41:51.0	+3:17.4
38	46	Yelena Kolomina	Kazakhstan	20:27.8	39	39.9	20:44.5	36	41:52.2	+3:18.6
39	61	Anastassiya Slonova	Kazakhstan	20:40.3	41	40.7	20:31.8	33	41:52.8	+3:19.2
40	49	Emily Nishikawa	Canada	20:42.6	44	36.7	20:45.4	37	42:04.7	+3:31.1
41	18	Claudia Nystad	Germany	20:40.7	42	36.1	20:52.0	40	42:08.8	+3:35.2
42	47	Virginia de Martin Topranin	Italy	20:19.8	33	38.0	21:19.8	47	42:17.6	+3:44.0
43	55	Agnieszka Szymańczak	Poland	20:42.9	45	36.3	21:03.1	43	42:22.3	+3:48.7
44	22	Kateřina Smutná	Austria	20:14.2	28	36.9	21:41.7	51	42:32.8	+3:59.2
45	34	Holly Brooks	United States	20:22.3	36	37.1	21:34.6	48	42:34.0	+4:00.4
46	44	Maryna Antsybor	Ukraine	21:06.1	47	34.5	21:01.9	42	42:42.5	+4:08.9
47	52	Kateryna Grygorenko	Ukraine	21:11.6	48	34.4	21:01.2	41	42:47.2	+4:13.6
48	51	Li Hongxue	China	21:21.0	50	44.2	21:12.5	44	43:17.7	+4:44.1
49	57	Brittany Webster	Canada	21:01.6	46	36.8	21:47.2	53	43:25.6	+4:52.0
50	42	Tetyana Antypenko	Ukraine	21:19.5	49	39.2	21:41.6	50	43:40.3	+5:06.7
51	40	Alena Sannikova	Belarus	21:46.4	53	36.3	21:47.0	52	44:09.7	+5:36.1
52	54	Lee Chae-Won	South Korea	22:41.1	57	44.8	20:51.3	39	44:17.2	+5:43.6
53	45	Amanda Ammar	Canada	21:39.3	52	37.4	22:07.6	55	44:24.3	+5:50.7
54	50	Antonia Grigorova	Bulgaria	22:12.5	55	34.5	21:40.9	49	44:27.9	+5:54.3
55	48	Tatyana Osipova	Kazakhstan	21:31.3	51	41.8	22:15.9	56	44:29.0	+5:55.4
56	53	Klara Moravcová	Czech Republic	22:00.9	54	42.7	21:57.2	54	44:40.8	+6:07.2
57	58	Vedrana Malec	Croatia	22:23.2	56	38.8	22:50.1	57	45:52.1	+7:18.5
58	60	Tímea Sára	Romania	22:54.0	58	38.5	23:10.5	58	46:43.0	+8:09.4
59	59	Kelime Çetinkaya	Turkey	22:54.9	59	41.7	23:41.1	59	47:17.7	+8:44.1
DSQ	8	Yuliya Chekalyova	Russia	~~19:50.6~~		~~36.4~~	~~19:44.6~~		~~40:11.6~~	~~+1:38.0~~
DSQ	29	Marina Piller	Italy	~~19:54.7~~		~~43.2~~	~~19:36.1~~		~~40:14.0~~	~~+1:40.4~~
