= FIS Nordic World Ski Championships 2015 – Women's 10 kilometre freestyle =

Women's 10 kilometre freestyle at the FIS Nordic World Ski Championships 2015
- Date: 24 February 2015
- Competitors: 71 from 31 nations
- Winning time: 25:08.8

Medalists
gold medal	Charlotte Kalla	Sweden
silver medal	Jessie Diggins	United States
bronze medal	Caitlin Compton	United States

The Women's 10 kilometre freestyle event of the FIS Nordic World Ski Championships 2015 was held on 24 February 2015. A 5 km qualification race was held on 18 February 2015.

== Results ==
=== Race ===
The race was started at 13:30.

Rank	Bib	Athlete	Country	Time	Deficit
1st place, gold medalist(s)	49	Charlotte Kalla	Sweden	25:08.8	
2nd place, silver medalist(s)	37	Jessie Diggins	United States	25:49.8	+41.0
3rd place, bronze medalist(s)	3	Caitlin Compton Gregg	United States	25:55.7	+46.9
4	27	Maria Rydqvist	Sweden	25:57.4	+48.6
5	5	Anouk Faivre-Picon	France	26:04.0	+55.2
6	15	Nathalie von Siebenthal	Switzerland	26:08.0	+59.2
7	11	Masako Ishida	Japan	26:11.3	+1:02.5
8	47	Kerttu Niskanen	Finland	26:13.4	+1:04.6
9	7	Seraina Boner	Switzerland	26:14.6	+1:05.8
10	53	Liz Stephen	United States	26:15.2	+1:06.4
11	1	Yuki Kobayashi	Japan	26:21.3	+1:12.5
12	21	Coraline Thomas Hugue	France	26:23.1	+1:14.3
13	2	Marina Piller	Italy	26:26.4	+1:17.6
14	25	Sylwia Jaśkowiec	Poland	26:27.8	+1:19.0
15	4	Kikkan Randall	United States	26:34.0	+1:25.2
16	45	Emma Wikén	Sweden	26:34.7	+1:25.9
17	17	Natalya Zhukova	Russia	26:36.2	+1:27.4
18	23	Célia Aymonier	France	26:43.9	+1:35.1
19	41	Riitta-Liisa Roponen	Finland	26:53.6	+1:44.8
20	31	Krista Pärmäkoski	Finland	26:57.7	+1:48.9
21	9	Ilaria Debertolis	Italy	26:58.3	+1:49.5
22	61	Heidi Weng	Norway	27:00.7	+1:51.9
23	35	Eva Vrabcová-Nývltová	Czech Republic	27:02.3	+1:53.5
24	39	Alevtina Tanygina	Russia	27:09.7	+2:00.9
25	33	Teresa Stadlober	Austria	27:14.9	+2:06.1
26	13	Lea Einfalt	Slovenia	27:16.7	+2:07.9
27	63	Therese Johaug	Norway	27:22.8	+2:14.0
28	57	Yuliya Chekalyova	Russia	27:27.5	+2:18.7
29	55	Ragnhild Haga	Norway	27:29.2	+2:20.4
30	54	Emily Nishikawa	Canada	27:20.3	+2:20.5
31	65	Marit Bjørgen	Norway	27:32.4	+2:23.6
32	22	Perianne Jones	Canada	27:35.5	+2:26.7
33	43	Astrid Uhrenholdt Jacobsen	Norway	27:41.2	+2:32.4
34	29	Laura Mononen	Finland	27:42.9	+2:34.1
35	32	Alena Procházková	Slovakia	27:46.1	+2:37.3
36	10	Katja Višnar	Slovenia	27:59.4	+2:50.6
37	62	Jennie Öberg	Sweden	28:06.5	+2:57.7
38	16	Kateryna Grygorenko	Ukraine	28:28.9	+3:20.1
39	36	Ekaterina Rudakova	Belarus	28:29.0	+3:20.2
40	38	Maryna Antsybor	Ukraine	28:30.2	+3:21.4
41	52	Kornelia Kubińska	Poland	28:30.3	+3:21.5
42	19	Claudia Nystad	Germany	28:35.2	+3:26.4
43	51	Stefanie Böhler	Germany	28:38.6	+3:29.8
44	60	Ewelina Marcisz	Poland	28:39.2	+3:30.4
45	56	Laura Orgué	Spain	28:40.0	+3:31.2
46	59	Nicole Fessel	Germany	28:42.9	+3:34.1
47	8	Tímea Sára	Romania	28:52.9	+3:44.1
48	48	Anastassiya Slonova	Kazakhstan	29:01.8	+3:53.0
49	14	Rosamund Musgrave	Great Britain	29:02.1	+3:53.3
50	30	Ina Lukonina	Belarus	29:08.7	+3:50.9
51	26	Vedrana Malec	Croatia	29:13.2	+4:04.4
52	28	Olivia Bouffard-Nesbitt	Canada	29:14.2	+4:05.4
53	58	Olga Repnitsyna	Russia	29:23.0	+4:14.2
54	12	Aimee Watson	Australia	29:28.0	+4:19.2
55	42	Karolína Grohová	Czech Republic	29:32.0	+4:23.2
56	18	Magdalena Kozielska	Poland	29:38.9	+4:30.1
57	50	Kateryna Serdyuk	Ukraine	29:43.6	+4:34.8
58	20	Antoniya Grigorova	Bulgaria	29:44.8	+4:36.0
59	46	Elena Kolomina	Kazakhstan	30:02.8	+4:54.0
60	34	Jessica Yeaton	Australia	30:12.2	+5:03.4
61	6	Xanthea Dewez	Australia	30:49.0	+5:40.2
62	69	Emőke Szőcs	Hungary	30:58.3	+5:49.5
63	40	Viktoriya Lanchakova	Kazakhstan	31:00.4	+5:51.6
64	67	Li Xin	China	31:03.9	+5:55.1
65	24	Esther Bottomley	Australia	31:15.0	+6:06.2
65	64	Nathalie Schwarz	Austria	31:15.0	+6:06.2
67	44	Olga Mandrika	Kazakhstan	31:53.5	+6:44.7
68	70	Rosana Kirsoka	Macedonia	33:08.4	+7:59.6
69	68	Anda Muižniece	Latvia	34:37.4	+9:28.6
70	66	Katya Galstyan	Armenia	35:39.8	+10:31.0
	71	Tanja Karišik	Bosnia and Herzegovina	DNF	

=== Qualification ===
The race was held at 13:30.

Rank	Bib	Athlete	Country	Time	Deficit	Notes
1	41	Chi Chunxue	China	13:33.8		Q
2	12	Tanja Karišik	Bosnia and Herzegovina	14:23.1	+49.3	Q
3	43	Casey Wright	Australia	14:41.3	+1:07.5	Q
4	45	Anna Trnka	Australia	14:41.6	+1:07.8	Q
5	39	Anda Muižniece	Latvia	14:43.5	+1:09.7	Q
6	35	Inga Paškovska	Latvia	15:11.1	+1:37.3	Q
7	30	Ildikó Papp	Hungary	15:12.9	+1:39.1	Q
8	32	Rosana Kiroska	Macedonia	15:18.7	+1:44.9	Q
9	37	Laima Klauža	Latvia	15:20.8	+1:47.0	Q
10	44	Katya Galstyan	Armenia	15:23.0	+1:49.2	Q
11	19	Enkhbayaryn Ariuntungalag	Mongolia	15:41.5	+2:07.7	
12	36	Neda Bukovskytė	Lithuania	15:43.7	+2:09.9	
13	34	Tzvetelina Pavlova	Bulgaria	15:56.4	+2:22.6	
14	25	Ágnes Simon	Hungary	15:59.3	+2:25.5	
15	21	Laura Csúcs-Fenyvesi	Hungary	16:06.8	+2:33.0	
16	33	Anja Ilić	Serbia	16:10.3	+2:36.5	
17	26	Ugnė Kastanauskaitė	Lithuania	16:11.9	+2:38.1	
18	13	Melina Meyer Megulas	Greece	16:14.5	+2:40.7	
19	14	Regina Bertóti	Hungary	16:16.0	+2:42.2	
20	7	Vaska Blagoeva	Bulgaria	16:16.4	+2:42.6	
21	11	Jadambaagiin Khaliunaa	Mongolia	16:19.7	+2:45.9	
22	22	Mirlene Picin	Brazil	16:23.1	+2:49.3	
23	40	Anna Mkhitaryan	Armenia	16:27.0	+2:53.2	
24	42	Samaneh Beirami Baher	Iran	16:32.7	+2:58.9	
25	31	Petya Stoycheva	Bulgaria	16:35.0	+3:01.2	
26	23	Katarina Bogdanović	Bosnia and Herzegovina	16:52.8	+3:19.0	
27	24	Marija Bulatović	Montenegro	16:55.0	+3:21.2	
28	17	Sara Mumović	Bosnia and Herzegovina	16:56.3	+3:22.5	
28	2	Doina Cravcenco	Moldova	16:56.3	+3:22.5	
30	38	Lilit Tonoyan	Armenia	17:12.1	+3:38.3	
31	20	Maida Drndić	Serbia	17:13.0	+3:39.2	
32	18	Teodora Đukić	Bosnia and Herzegovina	17:16.8	+3:43.0	
33	16	Marija Kolaroska	Macedonia	17:21.8	+3:48.0	
34	3	Martyna Biliūnaitė	Lithuania	17:37.3	+4:03.5	
35	27	Georgia Nimpiti	Greece	17:39.7	+4:05.9	
36	29	Farzaneh Rezasoltani	Iran	17:52.5	+4:18.7	
37	28	Haykanush Yeritsyan	Armenia	18:29.1	+4:55.3	
38	6	Jelena Bulatović	Montenegro	19:38.2	+6:04.4	
39	9	Kunduz Abdykadyrova	Kyrgyzstan	19:44.0	+6:10.2	
40	10	Juliana Tcaciova	Moldova	20:52.6	+7:18.8	
41	4	Dumitrita Ciobanu	Moldova	26:02.8	+12:29.0	
42	5	Alina Lukianova	Kyrgyzstan	27:52.6	+14:18.8	
	1	Makeleta Stephan	Tonga	DNS		
	15	Alexandra Camenșcic	Moldova	DNS		
	8	Viktoriia Shaiakhmedova	Kyrgyzstan	DNF		
