= FIS Nordic World Ski Championships 2015 – Women's 15 kilometre pursuit =

Women's 15 kilometre pursuit at the FIS Nordic World Ski Championships 2015
- Date: 21 February 2015
- Competitors: 56 from 24 nations
- Winning time: 40:57.6

Medalists
gold medal	Therese Johaug	Norway
silver medal	Astrid Uhrenholdt Jacobsen	Norway
bronze medal	Charlotte Kalla	Sweden

The Women's 15 kilometre pursuit event of the FIS Nordic World Ski Championships 2015 was held on 21 February 2015.

== Results ==
The race was started at 13:00.

Rank	Bib	Athlete	Country	Time	Deficit
1st place, gold medalist(s)	2	Therese Johaug	Norway	40:57.6	
2nd place, silver medalist(s)	11	Astrid Uhrenholdt Jacobsen	Norway	41:03.3	+5.7
3rd place, bronze medalist(s)	7	Charlotte Kalla	Sweden	41:03.6	+6.0
4	9	Kerttu Niskanen	Finland	42:03.3	+1:05.7
5	20	Sofia Bleckur	Sweden	42:05.0	+1:07.4
6	1	Marit Bjørgen	Norway	42:30.8	+1:33.2
7	3	Heidi Weng	Norway	42:38.9	+1:41.3
8	12	Riitta-Liisa Roponen	Finland	42:39.2	+1:41.6
9	18	Maria Rydqvist	Sweden	42:40.8	+1:43.2
10	15	Eva Vrabcová-Nývltová	Czech Republic	42:41.4	+1:43,8
11	5	Liz Stephen	United States	42:34.4	+1:45.8
12	8	Martine Ek Hagen	Norway	42:50.6	+1:53.0
13	21	Natalya Zhukova	Russia	42:58.9	+2:01.3
14	13	Alevtina Tanygina	Russia	43:09.7	+2:12.1
15	19	Aino-Kaisa Saarinen	Finland	43:22.2	+2:24.6
16	4	Yuliya Chekalyova	Russia	43:22.5	+2:24.6
17	22	Masako Ishida	Japan	43:25.7	+2:28.1
18	6	Stefanie Böhler	Germany	43:32.5	+2:34.9
19	10	Emma Wikén	Sweden	43:36.9	+2:39.3
20	14	Sadie Bjornsen	United States	43:38.7	+2:41.1
21	16	Teresa Stadlober	Austria	43:41.4	+2:43.8
22	23	Nathalie von Siebenthal	Switzerland	43:57.4	+2:59.8
23	17	Krista Pärmäkoski	Finland	44:13.5	+3:15.9
24	40	Kornelia Kubińska	Poland	44:24.4	+3:26.8
25	34	Virginia De Martin Topranin	Italy	44:36.8	+3:39.2
26	24	Anouk Faivre Picon	France	44:40.8	+3:43.2
27	38	Ewelina Marcisz	Poland	44:41.4	+3:43.8
28	37	Valentyna Shevchenko	Ukraine	44:45.9	+3:48.3
29	36	Victoria Carl	Germany	44:47.5	+3:49.9
30	27	Rosie Brennan	United States	44:49.0	+3:51.4
31	26	Kikkan Randall	United States	45:24.2	+4:26.6
32	42	Anastassiya Slonova	Kazakhstan	45:31.1	+4:33.5
33	33	Sandra Ringwald	Germany	45:34.9	+4:37.3
34	29	Yuki Kobayashi	Japan	45:46.6	+4:49.0
35	31	Lea Einfalt	Slovenia	45:50.2	+4:52.6
36	39	Laura Orgué	Spain	45:55.6	+4:58.0
37	48	Perianne Jones	Canada	46:08.6	+5:11.0
38	30	Nathalie Schzwarz	Austria	46:15.1	+5:17.5
39	57	Li Xin	China	46:19.5	+5:21.9
40	28	Marina Piller	Italy	46:19.7	+5:22.1
41	35	Yelena Soboleva	Russia	46:33.3	+5:35.9
42	44	Elena Kolomina	Kazakhstan	46:56.9	+5:59.3
43	45	Karolína Grohová	Czech Republic	47:09.6	+6:12.9
44	49	Kateryna Grygorenko	Ukraine	47:22.5	+6:24.0
45	32	Anamarija Lampič	Slovenia	48:01.9	+7:04.3
46	41	Anna Shevchenko	Kazakhstan	48:04.0	+7:06.4
47	53	Tímea Sára	Romania	48:29.0	+7:31.4
48	46	Ina Lukonina	Belarus	48:29.6	+7:32.0
49	50	Marina Matrosova	Kazakhstan	48:34.9	+7:37.3
50	43	Lee Chae-won	South Korea	49:06.4	+8:08.8
51	47	Vedrana Malec	Croatia	50:01.2	+9:03.6
52	58	Chi Chunxue	China	50:53.7	+9:56.1
53	52	Aimee Watson	Australia	51:08.6	+10:11.0
54	55	Xanthea Dewez	Australia	53:36.4	+12:38.8
55	54	Anna Trnka	Australia	LAP	
	25	Francesca Baudin	Italy	DNF	
	51	Heidi Raju	Estonia	DNS	
	56	Casey Wright	Australia	DNS	
