= Cross-country skiing at the 2014 Winter Olympics – Women's 30 kilometre freestyle =

Women's 30 kilometre freestyle at the XXII Olympic Winter Games
- Venue: Laura Biathlon & Ski Complex
- Dates: 22 February 2014
- Competitors: 57 from 24 nations
- Winning time: 1:11:05.2

Medalists
1st place, gold medalist(s)		Marit Bjørgen	Norway
2nd place, silver medalist(s)		Therese Johaug	Norway
3rd place, bronze medalist(s)		Kristin Størmer Steira	Norway

The women's 30 kilometre mass start freestyle cross-country skiing competition at the 2014 Sochi Olympics took place on 22 February at Laura Biathlon & Ski Complex. Three Norwegian athletes, Marit Bjørgen, Therese Johaug, and Kristin Størmer Steira, took the lead from 1 km on and skied in the group, never being threatened by other competitors. At the finish line, Bjørgen won gold, Johaug finished second, and Størmer Steira was third. This is the first gold for Norway in women's 30 km race, and the first clean sweep in Olympic cross country skiing since 1992. For Bjørgen, this was the sixth Winter Olympic gold medal, which, together with Lidiya Skoblikova and Lyubov Yegorova, made her a woman with the largest number of Winter Olympics gold medals won. Størmer Steira won her first individual Olympic medal. The defending 2010 champion Justyna Kowalczyk did not finish.

== Qualification ==
An athlete with a maximum of 100 FIS distance points (the A standard) will be allowed to compete in both or one of the event (sprint/distance). An athlete with a maximum 120 FIS sprint points will be allowed to compete in the sprint event and 10 km for women or 15 km for men provided their distance points do not exceed 300 FIS points. NOC's who do not have any athlete meeting the A standard can enter one competitor of each sex (known as the basic quota) in only 10 km classical event for women or 15 km classical event for men. They must have a maximum of 300 FIS distance points at the end of qualifying on January 20, 2014. The qualification period began in July 2012.

== Results ==
The race started at 13:30.

Rank	Bib	Name	Country	Time	Deficit
1st place, gold medalist(s)	2	Marit Bjørgen	Norway	1:11:05.2	—
2nd place, silver medalist(s)	1	Therese Johaug	Norway	1:11:07.8	+2.6
3rd place, bronze medalist(s)	10	Kristin Størmer Steira	Norway	1:11:28.8	+23.6
4	5	Kerttu Niskanen	Finland	1:12:26.9	+1:21.7
5	13	Eva Vrabcová-Nývltová	Czech Republic	1:12:27.1	+1:21.9
6	20	Aurore Jéan	France	1:12:27.5	+1:22.3
7	21	Coraline Hugue	France	1:12:29.5	+1:24.3
8	25	Emma Wikén	Sweden	1:12:31.6	+1:26.4
9	31	Seraina Boner	Switzerland	1:12:35.0	+1:29.8
10	37	Laura Orgué	Spain	1:12:37.3	+1:32.1
11	24	Anna Haag	Sweden	1:12:40.1	+1:34.9
12	15	Katrin Zeller	Germany	1:12:41.4	+1:36.2
13	34	Elisa Brocard	Italy	1:12:42.0	+1:36.8
14	28	Valentyna Shevchenko	Ukraine	1:12:42.6	+1:37.4
15	29	Natalya Zhukova	Russia	1:12:56.7	+1:51.5
16	30	Debora Agreiter	Italy	1:12:58.5	+1:53.3
17	26	Anouk Faivre Picon	France	1:13:29.4	+2:24.2
18	7	Krista Lähteenmäki	Finland	1:13:37.6	+2:32.4
19	4	Heidi Weng	Norway	1:13:46.1	+2:40.9
20	33	Teresa Stadlober	Austria	1:13:50.1	+2:44.9
21	9	Aino-Kaisa Saarinen	Finland	1:13:52.5	+2:47.3
22	48	Li Hongxue	China	1:14:01.5	+2:56.3
23	12	Masako Ishida	Japan	1:14:09.0	+3:03.8
24	11	Liz Stephen	United States	1:14:11.8	+3:06.6
25	19	Riitta-Liisa Roponen	Finland	1:14:51.6	+3:46.4
26	32	Holly Brooks	United States	1:14:58.3	+3:53.1
27	16	Kikkan Randall	United States	1:15:10.7	+4:05.5
28	22	Irina Khazova	Russia	1:15:19.2	+4:14.0
29	35	Barbara Jezeršek	Slovenia	1:15:35.8	+4:30.6
30	44	Sylwia Jaśkowiec	Poland	1:15:47.6	+4:42.4
31	6	Charlotte Kalla	Sweden	1:16:18.5	+5:13.3
32	41	Maryna Antsybor	Ukraine	1:16:22.7	+5:17.5
33	52	Lee Chae-won	South Korea	1:16:38.2	+5:33.0
34	40	Petra Novaková	Czech Republic	1:17:49.6	+6:44.4
35	49	Kateryna Grygorenko	Ukraine	1:17:53.0	+6:47.8
36	18	Sara Lindborg	Sweden	1:18:03.9	+6:58.7
37	14	Jessie Diggins	United States	1:18:13.0	+7:07.8
38	39	Paulina Maciuszek	Poland	1:18:44.7	+7:39.5
39	38	Alena Sannikova	Belarus	1:18:46.3	+7:41.1
40	53	Kornelia Kubińska	Poland	1:19:57.7	+8:52.5
41	36	Ilaria Debertolis	Italy	1:20:22.2	+9:17.0
42	50	Klara Moravcová	Czech Republic	1:20:56.4	+9:51.2
43	54	Brittany Webster	Canada	1:21:05.5	+10:00.3
44	46	Emily Nishikawa	Canada	1:21:38.6	+10:33.4
45	43	Elena Kolomina	Kazakhstan	1:21:50.0	+10:44.8
46	42	Amanda Ammar	Canada	1:22:03.7	+10:58.5
47	47	Antoniya Grigorova-Burgova	Bulgaria	1:23:05.6	+12:00.4
48	45	Tatyana Osipova	Kazakhstan	1:23:52.6	+12:47.4
49	51	Heidi Widmer	Canada	1:24:11.5	+13:06.3
50	56	Vedrana Malec	Croatia	1:24:13.4	+13:08.2
51	57	Aimee Watson	Australia	1:34:00.1	+22:54.9
DSQ	27	Marina Piller	Italy	~~1:14:44.7~~	~~+3:39.5~~
DSQ	17	Yuliya Ivanova	Russia	~~1:15:22.1~~	~~+4:16.9~~
DSQ	8	Yuliya Chekalyova	Russia	~~1:15:46.6~~	~~+4:41.4~~
	3	Justyna Kowalczyk	Poland	Did not finish	
	23	Nicole Fessel	Germany	Did not finish	
	55	Teodora Malcheva	Bulgaria	Did not finish	
