= FIS Nordic World Ski Championships 2013 – Women's 30 kilometre classical =

Women's 30 kilometre classical at the FIS Nordic World Ski Championships 2013
- Date: 2 March 2013
- Competitors: 45 from 17 nations
- Winning time: 1:27:19.9

Medalists
gold medal	Marit Bjørgen	Norway
silver medal	Justyna Kowalczyk	Poland
bronze medal	Therese Johaug	Norway

The Women's 30 kilometre classical at the FIS Nordic World Ski Championships 2013 was held on 2 March 2013.

== Results ==
The race was started at 12:15.

Rank	Bib	Athlete	Country	Time	Deficit
1st place, gold medalist(s)	7	Marit Bjørgen	Norway	1:27:19.9	
2nd place, silver medalist(s)	1	Justyna Kowalczyk	Poland	1:27:23.6	+3.7
3rd place, bronze medalist(s)	2	Therese Johaug	Norway	1:27:28.6	+8.7
4	6	Heidi Weng	Norway	1:28:58.2	+1:38.3
5	17	Nicole Fessel	Germany	1:29:08.9	+1:49.0
6	18	Anna Haag	Sweden	1:29:25.6	+2:05.7
7	12	Kerttu Niskanen	Finland	1:29:32.7	+2:12.8
8	4	Anne Kyllönen	Finland	1:29:36.0	+2:16.1
9	3	Kristin Størmer Steira	Norway	1:29:36.4	+2:16.5
10	9	Masako Ishida	Japan	1:29:39.0	+2:19.1
11	8	Charlotte Kalla	Sweden	1:31:04.6	+3:44.7
12	13	Valentyna Shevchenko	Ukraine	1:31:10.5	+3:50.6
13	5	Yuliya Chekalyova	Russia	1:31:26.5	+4:06.6
14	10	Katrin Zeller	Germany	1:31:51.9	+4:32.0
15	19	Yuliya Ivanova	Russia	1:32:00.6	+4:40.7
16	14	Liz Stephen	United States	1:32:12.0	+4:52.1
17	16	Aino-Kaisa Saarinen	Finland	1:32:25.5	+5:05.6
18	23	Sofia Bleckur	Sweden	1:32:28.0	+5:08.1
19	29	Tetyana Antypenko	Ukraine	1:32:44.7	+5:24.8
20	20	Virginia de Martin Topranin	Italy	1:33:00.1	+5:40.2
21	24	Olga Kuzyukova	Russia	1:33:08.7	+5:48.8
22	15	Emma Wikén	Sweden	1:34:14.1	+6:54.2
23	35	Kornelia Kubińska	Poland	1:34:50.4	+7:30.5
24	22	Debora Agreiter	Italy	1:35:42.0	+8:22.1
25	34	Ida Sargent	United States	1:35:47.3	+8:56.7
26	26	Eva Vrabcová-Nývltová	Czech Republic	1:36:16.6	+8:56.7
27	32	Alena Sannikova	Belarus	1:37:06.3	+9:46.4
28	30	Lucia Scardoni	Italy	1:37:35.2	+10:15.3
29	27	Laura Orgué	Spain	1:37:41.6	+10:21.7
30	36	Kateryna Grygorenko	Ukraine	1:38:08.2	+10:48.3
31	37	Tatjana Mannima	Estonia	1:38:12.8	+10:52.9
32	25	Yuliya Tikhonova	Russia	1:38:15.4	+10:55.5
33	33	Marina Matrossova	Kazakhstan	1:39:13.8	+11:53.9
34	40	Li Hongxue	China	1:40:44.1	+13:24.2
35	31	Yuki Kobayashi	Japan	1:42:16.5	+14:56.6
36	38	Anna Shevchenko	Kazakhstan	1:44:52.9	+17:33.0
37	44	Li Xin	China	1:46:12.2	+18.52.3
	28	Emily Nishikawa	Canada	LAP	
	45	Iryna Leletko	Ukraine	LAP	
	11	Krista Lähteenmäki	Finland	DNF	
	41	Veronica Cavallar	Italy	DNF	
	21	Jessie Diggins	United States	DNF	
	42	Oxana Yatskaya	Kazakhstan	DNF	
	43	Yana Hrakovich	Belarus	DNF	
	39	Viktoriya Lanchakova	Kazakhstan	DNS	
