= FIS Nordic World Ski Championships 2013 – Women's 15 kilometre pursuit =

Women's Women's 15 kilometre pursuit at the FIS Nordic World Ski Championships 2013
- Date: 23 February 2013
- Competitors: 76 from 30 nations
- Winning time: 39:04.4

Medalists
gold medal	Marit Bjørgen	Norway
silver medal	Therese Johaug	Norway
bronze medal	Heidi Weng	Norway

The women's 15 kilometre pursuit at the FIS Nordic World Ski Championships 2013 took place on 23 February 2013.

== Results ==
The race was started at 12:45.

Rank	Bib	Athlete	Country	Time	Deficit
1st place, gold medalist(s)	7	Marit Bjørgen	Norway	39:04.4	
2nd place, silver medalist(s)	2	Therese Johaug	Norway	39:07.8	+3.4
3rd place, bronze medalist(s)	6	Heidi Weng	Norway	39:19.3	+14.9
4	3	Kristin Størmer Steira	Norway	39:20.7	+16.3
5	1	Justyna Kowalczyk	Poland	39:31.5	+27.1
6	9	Charlotte Kalla	Sweden	39:45.6	+41.2
7	5	Yuliya Chekalyova	Russia	39:51.3	+46.9
8	13	Krista Lähteenmäki	Finland	39:53.2	+48.8
9	8	Astrid Uhrenholdt Jacobsen	Norway	40:10.9	+1:06.5
10	11	Masako Ishida	Japan	40:11.9	+1:07.5
11	21	Yuliya Ivanova	Russia	40:21.5	+1:17.1
12	14	Kerttu Niskanen	Finland	40:33.1	+1:28.7
13	29	Aurore Jéan	France	40:35.4	+1:31.0
14	17	Emma Wikén	Sweden	40:36.3	+1:31.9
15	20	Anna Haag	Sweden	40:47.5	+1:31.9
16	10	Riitta-Liisa Roponen	Finland	40:51.3	+1:43.1
17	4	Anne Kyllönen	Finland	40:52.4	+1:46.9
18	23	Kateřina Smutná	Austria	40:58.9	+1:48.0
19	24	Virginia de Martin Topranin	Italy	41:01.0	+1:56.6
20	16	Elizabeth Stephen	United States	41:12.6	+2:08.2
21	15	Valentyna Shevchenko	Ukraine	41:14.9	+2:10.5
22	18	Nicole Fessel	Germany	41:17.9	+2:13.5
23	51	Kornelia Kubińska	Poland	41:18.1	+2:13.7
24	25	Mariya Gushchina	Russia	41:18.1	+2:13.7
25	12	Katrin Zeller	Germany	41:38.1	+2:33.7
26	19	Aliya Iksanova	Russia	41:38.2	+2:33.8
27	53	Agnieszka Szymańczak	Poland	41:41.7	+2:37.3
28	50	Paulina Maciuszek	Poland	41:41.8	+2:37.4
29	31	Teresa Stadlober	Austria	41:45.4	+2:41.0
30	41	Tetyana Antypenko	Ukraine	41:46.5	+2:42.1
31	26	Debora Agreiter	Italy	41:49.3	+2:44.9
32	34	Coraline Hugue	France	41:58.6	+2:54.2
33	60	Veronica Cavallar	Italy	42:01.5	+2:57.1
34	27	Sofia Bleckur	Sweden	42:19.1	+3:14.7
35	37	Laura Orgué	Spain	42:24.2	+3:19.8
36	35	Célia Aymonier	France	42:27.0	+3:22.6
37	33	Sadie Bjornsen	United States	42:27.1	+3:22.7
38	49	Ida Sargent	United States	42:35.4	+3:31.0
39	40	Alena Procházková	Slovakia	42:45.3	+3:40.9
40	32	Barbara Jezeršek	Slovenia	42:46.2	+3:41.8
41	45	Ekaterina Rudakova	Belarus	42:49.6	+3:45.2
42	43	Lucia Scardoni	Italy	43:06.7	+4:02.3
43	52	Kateryna Grygorenko	Ukraine	43:15.3	+4:10.9
44	44	Yuki Kobayashi	Japan	43:26.1	+4:21.7
45	47	Marina Matrosova	Kazakhstan	43:32.3	+4:27.9
46	28	Anouk Faivre-Picon	France	43:42.6	+4:38.2
47	36	Maryna Antsybor	Ukraine	43:42.7	+4:38.3
48	46	Alena Sannikova	Belarus	43:52.1	+4:47.7
49	22	Holly Brooks	United States	43:56.2	+4:51.8
50	58	Li Hongxue	China	43:57.3	+4:52.9
51	30	Sandra Ringwald	Germany	44:44.5	+5:40.1
52	66	Kaija Vahtra	Estonia	44:51.5	+5:47.1
53	42	Elena Kolomina	Kazakhstan	44:54.6	+5:50.2
54	38	Nika Razinger	Slovenia	45:08.3	+6:03.9
55	62	Li Xin	China	45:10.7	+6:06.3
56	56	Antoniya Grigorova-Burgova	Bulgaria	45:11.1	+6:06.7
57	48	Brittany Webster	Canada	45:25.0	+6:20.6
58	63	Vedrana Malec	Croatia	45:27.3	+6:22.9
59	55	Anna Shevchenko	Kazakhstan	45:28.3	+6:23.9
60	61	Yana Hrakovich	Belarus	45:30.8	+6:26.4
61	68	Guo Liping	China	46:25.0	+7:20.6
62	57	Heidi Raju	Estonia	46:25.7	+7:21.3
63	54	Tatyana Osipova	Kazakhstan	46:25.7	+7:21.3
64	65	Ingrida Ardišauskaitė	Lithuania	46:32.5	+7:28.1
65	71	Aimee Watson	Australia	46:59.5	+7:55.1
66	59	Timeea Sara	Romania	47:50.9	+8:46.5
67	75	Sarah Murphy	New Zealand	47:56.4	+8:52.0
68	72	Anna Trnka	Australia	48:12.5	+9:08.1
69	64	Fiona Hughes	Great Britain	48:13.5	+9:09.1
70	69	Niviaq Chemnitz Berthelsen	Denmark	50:23.0	+11:18.6
	70	Lescinska Grimmer	Australia	LAP	
	73	Syuzanna Varosyan	Armenia	LAP	
	74	Otgontsetseg Chinbat	Mongolia	LAP	
	76	Uugantsetseg Nandintsetseg	Mongolia	LAP	
	67	Esther Bottomley	Australia	DNF	
	39	Emily Nishikawa	Canada	DNF	
