= FIS Nordic World Ski Championships 2013 – Women's 4 × 5 kilometre relay =

Women's 4 × 5 kilometre relay at the FIS Nordic World Ski Championships 2013
- Date: 28 February 2013
- Competitors: 64 from 16 nations

Medalists
gold medal	Heidi Weng; Therese Johaug; Kristin Størmer Steira; Marit Bjørgen	Norway
silver medal	Ida Ingemarsdotter; Emma Wikén; Anna Haag; Charlotte Kalla	Sweden
bronze medal	Yuliya Ivanova; Aliya Iksanova; Mariya Gushchina; Yuliya Chekalyova	Russia

The women's 4 x 5 kilometre relay at the FIS Nordic World Ski Championships 2013 was held on 28 February 2013.

== Results ==
The race was started at 12:45.

Rank	Bib	Country	Athlete	Time	Deficit
1st place, gold medalist(s)	1	Norway	Heidi Weng; Therese Johaug; Kristin Størmer Steira; Marit Bjørgen	1:00:36.5; 15:47.4; 16:00.5; 14:32.6; 14:16.0	
2nd place, silver medalist(s)	2	Sweden	Ida Ingemarsdotter; Emma Wikén; Anna Haag; Charlotte Kalla	1:01:02.7; 16:22.2; 16:09.2; 14:14.7; 14:16.6	+26.2
3rd place, bronze medalist(s)	6	Russia	Yuliya Ivanova; Aliya Iksanova; Mariya Gushchina; Yuliya Chekalyova	1:01:22.3; 15:57.5; 16:53.2; 14:33.0; 13:58.6	+45.8
4	9	United States	Sadie Bjornsen; Kikkan Randall; Elizabeth Stephen; Jessie Diggins	1:01:48.9; 16:20.5; 16:43.5; 14:11.7; 14:33.2	+1:12.4
5	3	Finland	Anne Kyllönen; Kerttu Niskanen; Riitta-Liisa Roponen; Riikka Sarasoja-Lilja	1:02:00.3; 16:21.9; 16:10.0; 14:18.7; 15:09.7	+1:23.8
6	12	France	Aurore Jéan; Célia Aymonier; Anouk Faivre-Picon; Coraline Hugue	1:02:30.2; 15:56.7; 16:57.4; 14:42.9; 14:53.2	+1:53.7
7	5	Germany	Nicole Fessel; Katrin Zeller; Denise Herrmann; Miriam Gössner	1:02:44.3; 16:15.4; 16:44.9; 14:35.9; 15:08.1	+2:07.8
8	4	Italy	Lucia Scardoni; Virginia de Martin Topranin; Debora Agreiter; Marina Piller	1:03:32.6; 16:24.0; 16:40.6; 14:53.9; 15:34.1	+2:56.1
9	8	Poland	Kornelia Kubińska; Justyna Kowalczyk; Paulina Maciuszek; Agnieszka Szymańczak	1:04:11.5; 16:24.5; 15:22.6; 16:12.3; 16:12.1	+3:35.0
10	11	Ukraine	Tetyana Antypenko; Valentyna Shevchenko; Maryna Antsybor; Kateryna Grygorenko	1:04:33.0; 17:16.5; 17:01.2; 15:07.5; 15:07.8	+3:56.5
11	14	Austria	Kateřina Smutná; Teresa Stadlober; Veronika Mayerhofer; Kerstin Muschet	1:04:50.6; 16:15.0; 16:46.8; 15:45.2; 16:03.6	+4:14.1
12	16	Czech Republic	Eva Vrabcová-Nývltová; Petra Novaková; Karolina Grohová; Lucie Charvatová	1:06:26.6; 16:45.7; 17:41.5; 15:44.9; 16:14.5	+5:50.1
13	15	Estonia	Triin Ojaste; Tatjana Mannima; Kaija Vahtra; Heidi Raju	1:09:10.7; 17:15.9; 18:11.3; 16:28.4; 17:15.1	+8:34.2
	7	Slovenia	Barbara Jezeršek; Katja Višnar; Vesna Fabjan; Alenka Čebašek	17:33.8; 18:58.9; 15:33.7	LAP
	10	Kazakhstan	Yelena Kolomina; Anna Stoyan; Vikotriya Lanchakova; Anna Shevchenko	18:26.0; 18:42.6; 15:56.4	LAP
	13	Canada	Daria Gaiazova; Perianne Jones; Emily Nishikawa; Brittany Webster	16:42.0; 17:32.3; 15:33.8	DNF
