= FIS Nordic World Ski Championships 2015 – Women's 4 × 5 kilometre relay =

Women's 4 × 5 kilometre relay at the FIS Nordic World Ski Championships 2015
- Date: 26 February 2015
- Competitors: 56 from 14 nations
- Winning time: 49:04.7

Medalists
gold medal	Heidi Weng; Therese Johaug; Astrid Uhrenholdt Jacobsen; Marit Bjørgen	Norway
silver medal	Sofia Bleckur; Charlotte Kalla; Maria Rydqvist; Stina Nilsson	Sweden
bronze medal	Aino-Kaisa Saarinen; Kerttu Niskanen; Riitta-Liisa Roponen; Krista Pärmäkoski	Finland

The women's 4 × 5 kilometre relay event of the FIS Nordic World Ski Championships 2015 was held on 26 February 2015.

== Results ==
The race was started at 13:30.

Rank	Bib	Country	Athlete	Time	Deficit
1st place, gold medalist(s)	5	Norway	Heidi Weng; Therese Johaug; Astrid Uhrenholdt Jacobsen; Marit Bjørgen	49:04.7; 14:20.1; 14:06.7; 10:17.0; 10:20.9	
2nd place, silver medalist(s)	1	Sweden	Sofia Bleckur; Charlotte Kalla; Maria Rydqvist; Stina Nilsson	49:33.9; 14:31.6; 13:56.8; 10:33.2; 10:32.3	+29.2
3rd place, bronze medalist(s)	2	Finland	Aino-Kaisa Saarinen; Kerttu Niskanen; Riitta-Liisa Roponen; Krista Pärmäkoski	49:35.6; 14:19.3; 14:23.5; 10:18.8; 10.34.0	+30.9
4	9	United States	Sadie Bjornsen; Rosie Brennan; Liz Stephen; Jessie Diggins	50:54.6; 15:09.7; 14:57.3; 10:14.4; 10:33.2	+1:49.9
5	7	Poland	Kornelia Kubińska; Justyna Kowalczyk; Ewelina Marcisz; Sylwia Jaśkowiec	50:57.0; 15:00.8; 14:28.5; 10.45.7; 10:42.0	+1:52.3
6	3	Germany	Victoria Carl; Stefanie Böhler; Denise Herrmann; Nicole Fessel	50:59.2; 15:27.0; 14:44.3; 10:13.4; 10:34.5	+1:54.5
7	6	Russia	Anastasia Dotsenko; Alevtina Tanygina; Natalya Zhukova; Yuliya Chekalyova	51:44.4; 14:38.1; 15:32.7; 10:54.6; 10:39.0	+2:39.7
8	4	France	Aurore Jéan; Célia Aymonier; Anouk Faivre-Picon; Coraline Thomas Hugue	52:12.8; 15:46.3; 14:50.0; 10:43.4; 10:53.1	+3:08.1
9	8	Italy	Francesca Baudin; Virginia de Martin Topranin; Marina Piller; Ilaria Debertolis	53:05.6; 15:37.1; 14:59.6; 11:13.5; 11:15.4	+4:00.9
10	10	Slovenia	Anamarija Lampič; Katja Višnar; Nika Razinger; Lea Einfalt	53:20.6; 15:54.4; 15:20.3; 11:03.0; 11:02.9	+4:15.9
11	11	Ukraine	Kateryna Serdyuk; Valentyna Shevchenko; Maryna Antsybor; Kateryna Grygorenko	54:03.7; 15:53.6; 15:34.4; 10:55.9; 11:39.8	+4:59.0
12	13	Kazakhstan	Anna Stoyan; Marina Matrosova; Olga Mandrika; Anastassiya Slonova	LAP; 16:01.0; 16:20.6; LAP	
13	12	Estonia	Triin Ojaste; Laura Alba; Tatjana Mannima; Heidi Raju	LAP; 17:37.3; 16:55.4; LAP	
14	14	Australia	Jessica Yeaton; Aimee Watson; Esther Bottomley; Casey Wright	LAP; 17:20.5; LAP	
