= Bettina Gruber =

Swiss cross-country skier

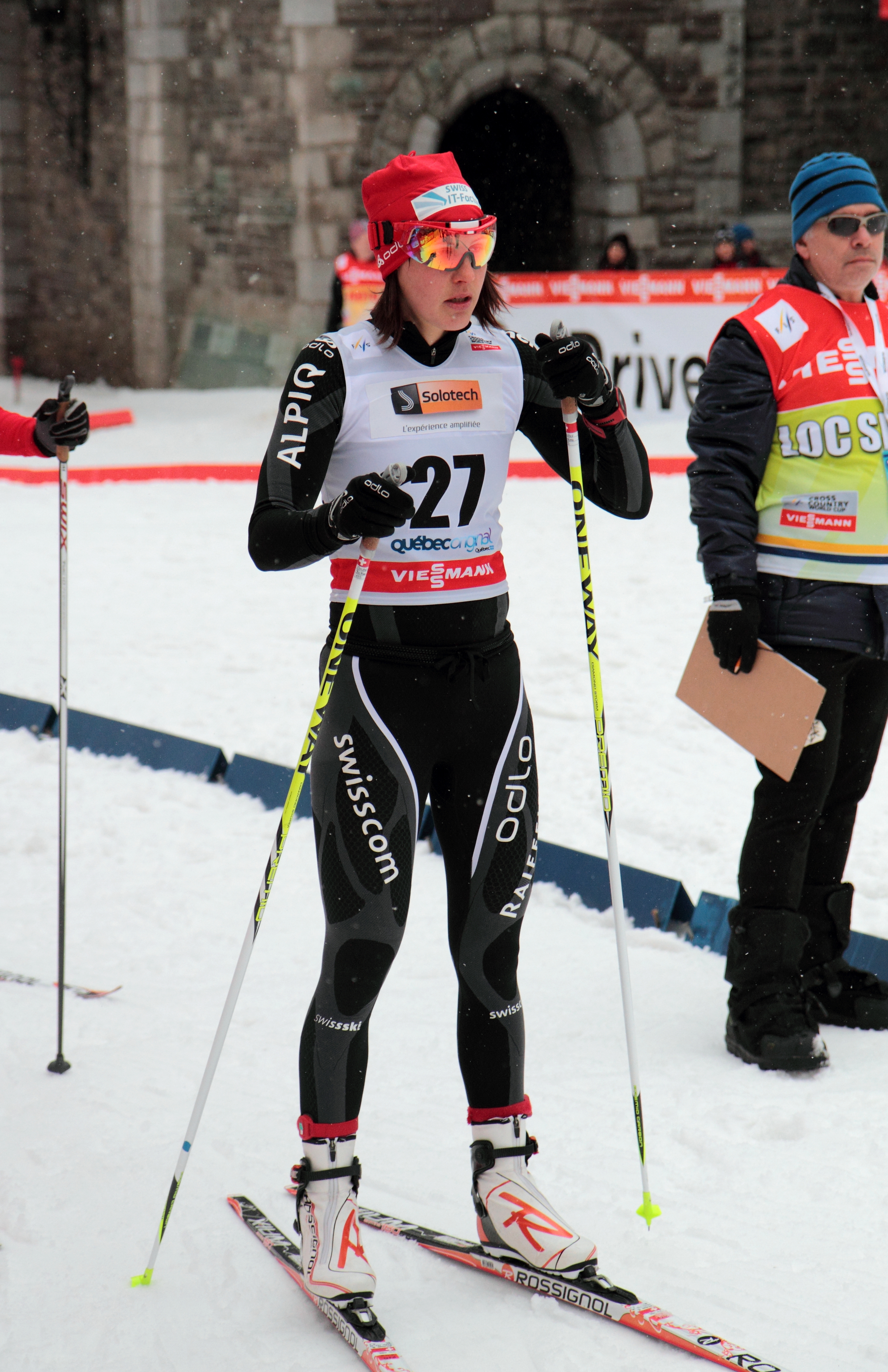
- Bettina Gruber in 2012

Personal information
- Nationality: Switzerland
- Born: 31 January 1985 (age 41) Rossa, Switzerland

Sport
- Sport: Skiing
- Club: SAS Bern

World Cup career
- Seasons: 7 – (2006, 2008–2010, 2012–2014)
- Indiv. starts: 39
- Indiv. podiums: 0
- Team starts: 9
- Team podiums: 0
- Overall titles: 0 – (73rd in 2010)
- Discipline titles: 0

Bettina Gruber (born 31 January 1985) is a Swiss cross-country skier who competed between 2002 and 2016. At the 2010 Winter Olympics in Vancouver, she finished 18th in the team sprint event.

Gruber's best World Cup finish was fifth in the team sprint event at Russia in January 2010.

== Cross-country skiing results ==
All results are sourced from the International Ski Federation (FIS).

=== Olympic Games ===
Year	Age	10 km individual	15 km skiathlon	30 km mass start	Sprint	4 × 5 km relay	Team sprint
2010	25	—	—	—	—	—	17
2014	29	—	—	—	—	—	6

=== World Championships ===
Year	Age	10 km individual	15 km skiathlon	30 km mass start	Sprint	4 × 5 km relay	Team sprint
2013	28	—	—	—	46	—	11

=== World Cup ===
Season Standings
Season	Age	Discipline standings			Ski Tour standings		
Season	Age	Overall	Distance	Sprint	Nordic Opening	Tour de Ski	World Cup Final
2006	21	NC	—	NC	—N/a	—N/a	—N/a
2008	23	NC	—	NC	—N/a	—	—
2009	24	124	—	83	—N/a	—	—
2010	25	73	—	46	—N/a	—	—
2012	27	77	NC	51	—	—	—
2013	28	93	NC	57	—	—	—
2014	29	97	66	74	DNF	—	—
