= Yuliya Ivanova (cross-country skier) =

Russian cross-country skier

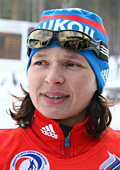

Personal information
- Full name: Yuliya Anatoliyevna Ivanova
- Nationality: Russia
- Born: 9 September 1985 (age 40) Sosnogorsk, Soviet Union

Sport
- Sport: Skiing

World Cup career
- Seasons: 11 – (2005–2015)
- Indiv. starts: 132
- Indiv. podiums: 3
- Indiv. wins: 0
- Team starts: 15
- Team podiums: 3
- Team wins: 0
- Overall titles: 0 – (16th in 2012)
- Discipline titles: 0
Medal record
Women's cross-country skiing
Representing Russia
World Championships
Bronze medal – third place	2013 Val di Fiemme	4 × 5 km relay

Yuliya Anatoliyevna Ivanova (Russian: Юлия Анатольевна Иванова) (born 9 September 1985 in Sosnogorsk) is a Russian cross-country skier. She competed at the FIS Nordic World Ski Championships 2011 in Oslo, and at the FIS Nordic World Ski Championships 2013 in Val di Fiemme.

== Career ==
She competed at the 2014 Winter Olympics in Sochi, in 10 kilometre classical and 30 kilometre freestyle.

She was part of the Russian team that placed sixth in the relay, and part of the Russian team which placed sixth in the team sprint.

In December 2016, the International Ski Federation (FIS) provisionally suspended six Russian cross-country skiers linked to doping violations during the 2014 Winter Olympics, including Yuliya Ivanova. On 9 November 2017, she was officially disqualified from the 2014 Winter Olympics by the International Olympic Committee.

== Cross-country skiing results ==
All results are sourced from the International Ski Federation (FIS).

=== Olympic Games ===
Year	Age	10 km individual	15 km skiathlon	30 km mass start	Sprint	4 × 5 km relay	Team sprint
2014	28	DSQ	—	DSQ	—	DSQ	DSQ

=== World Championships ===
- 1 medal – (1 bronze)

Year	Age	10 km individual	15 km skiathlon	30 km mass start	Sprint	4 × 5 km relay	Team sprint
2011	25	—	27	—	—	—	10
2013	27	—	11	15	18	Bronze	—

=== World Cup ===
Season standings
Season	Age	Discipline standings			Ski Tour standings		
Season	Age	Overall	Distance	Sprint	Nordic Opening	Tour de Ski	World Cup Final
2005	19	NC	—	NC	—N/a	—N/a	—N/a
2006	20	96	NC	58	—N/a	—N/a	—N/a
2007	21	88	85	61	—N/a	—	—N/a
2008	22	43	31	54	—N/a	29	—
2009	23	58	53	44	—N/a	31	—
2010	24	119	—	85	—N/a	—	—
2011	25	42	32	43	28	DNF	25
2012	26	16	16	25	30	13	10
2013	27	29	26	40	19	19	—
2014	28	30	25	54	10	DNF	25
2015	29	74	69	67	—	25	—N/a

==== Individual podiums ====
- 3 podiums – (2 WC, 1 SWC)

No.	Season	Date	Location	Race	Level	Place
1	2011–12	4 March 2012	Lahti, Finland	1.4 km Sprint C	World Cup	2nd
2	2011–12	14 March 2012	Stockholm, Sweden	1.0 km Sprint C	Stage World Cup	2nd
3	2013–14	19 January 2014	Szklarska Poręba, Poland	10 km Mass Start C	World Cup	3rd

==== Team podiums ====
- 3 podiums – (1 RL, 2 TS)

No.	Season	Date	Location	Race	Level	Place	Teammate(s)
1	2010–11	6 February 2011	Rybinsk, Russia	4 × 5 km Relay C/F	World Cup	3rd	Kasakul / Tikhonova / Korostelyova
2	2012–13	3 February 2013	Sochi, Russia	6 × 1.25 km Team Sprint C	World Cup	2nd	Matveyeva
3	2013–14	12 January 2014	Nové Město, Czech Republic	6 × 1.3 km Team Sprint C	World Cup	3rd	Shapovalova
