= Chandra Crawford =

Canadian cross-country skier (born 1983)

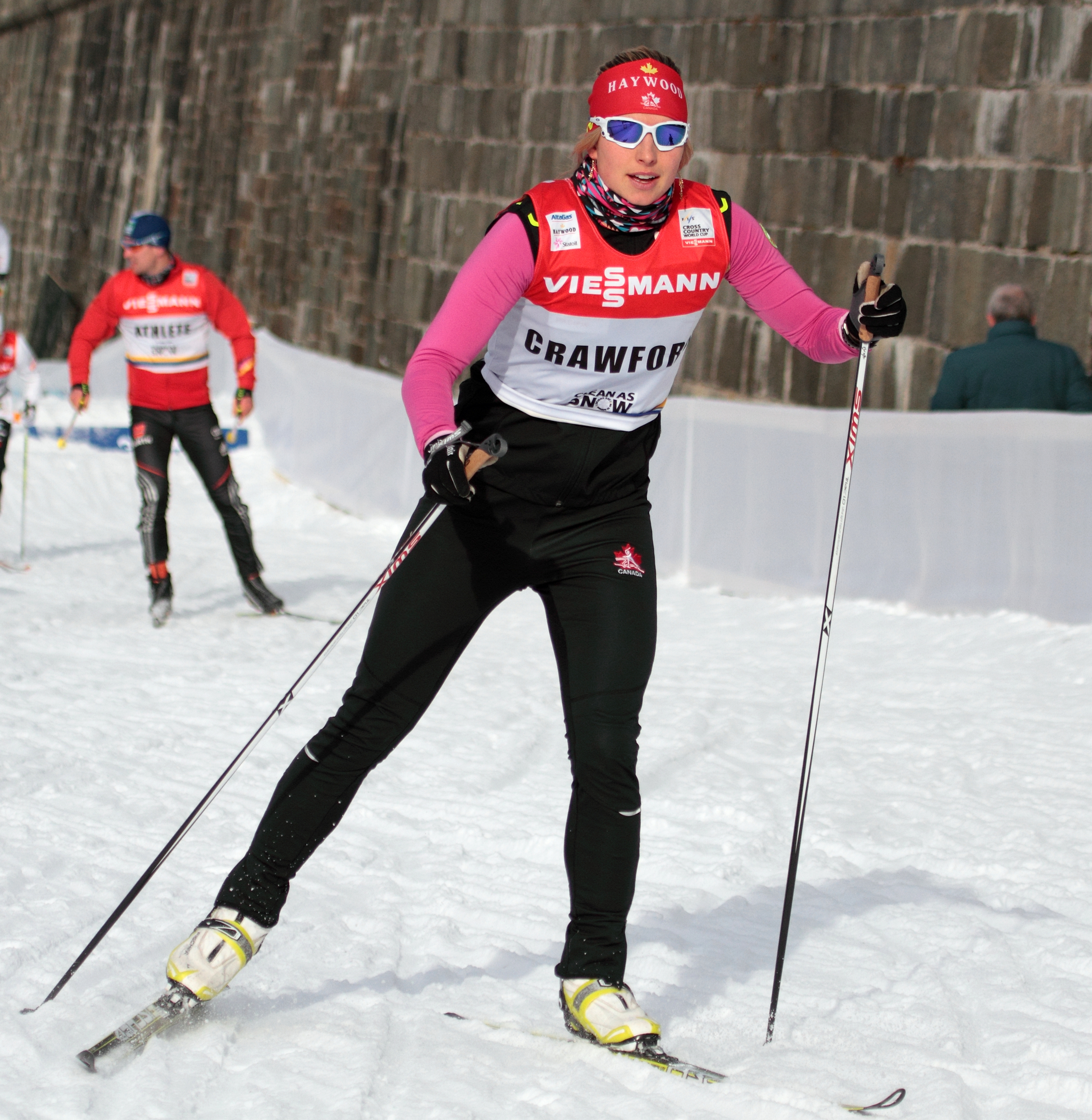

Personal information
- Nationality: Canada
- Born: 19 November 1983 (age 42) Canmore, Alberta, Canada
- Height: 5 ft 8 in (173 cm)

Sport
- Sport: Skiing
- Club: Canmore Nordic Ski Club

World Cup career
- Seasons: 9 – (2005–2008, 2010–2014)
- Indiv. starts: 84
- Indiv. podiums: 5
- Indiv. wins: 2
- Team starts: 12
- Team podiums: 2
- Team wins: 0
- Overall titles: 0 – (23rd in 2008)
- Discipline titles: 0
Medal record
Women's cross-country skiing
Representing Canada
Olympic Games
| Gold medal – first place | 2006 Turin | Individual sprint |
U23 World Championships
| Silver medal – second place | 2004 Park City | Individual sprint |
| Bronze medal – third place | 2004 Park City | Team sprint |

Chandra Crawford (born November 19, 1983) is a Canadian cross-country skier who has competed since 2001 at the age of 16. Prior to this, she was a biathlete for five years. She was born in Canmore, Alberta, Canada.

== Career ==
On February 22, 2006, she became the surprise gold medal winner in the women's cross-country 1.1 km (0.7 mi) sprint at the 2006 Winter Olympics in Turin, Italy. Video of her circulated on the Internet as she sang "O Canada", the Canadian national anthem, from the medals podium. Then-CBC commentator Brian Willams said of the event: "If you're ever standing on top of the podium, this is how you sing our national anthem."

She won her first World Cup gold medal in her home-town of Canmore in January 2008 in the sprint event, followed by a second gold in Lahti, Finland, in March 2008. She finished the 2008 World Cup season ranked seventh in the sprint and 23rd overall.

Crawford placed 44th in the freestyle sprint during the 2014 Winter Olympics in Sochi, Russia. On March 27, 2014, she retired from competitive skiing.

== Cross-country skiing results ==
All results are sourced from the International Ski Federation (FIS).

=== Olympic Games ===
- 1 medal – (1 gold)

| Year | Age | 10 km individual | 15 km skiathlon | 30 km mass start | Sprint | 4 × 5 km relay | Team sprint |
|---|---|---|---|---|---|---|---|
| 2006 | 22 | — | 60 | — | Gold | — | — |
| 2010 | 26 | — | — | — | 26 | 15 | — |
| 2014 | 30 | — | — | — | 43 | — | — |

=== World Championships ===
| Year | Age | 10 km individual | 15 km skiathlon | 30 km mass start | Sprint | 4 × 5 km relay | Team sprint |
|---|---|---|---|---|---|---|---|
| 2005 | 21 | — | — | DNF | 45 | — | — |
| 2007 | 23 | 59 | — | — | 32 | 16 | 15 |
| 2011 | 27 | 52 | — | 42 | 28 | 14 | — |

=== World Cup ===
==== Season standings ====
| Season | Age | Discipline standings | | | Ski Tour standings | | |
| Season | Age | Overall | Distance | Sprint | Nordic Opening | Tour de Ski | World Cup Final |
|---|---|---|---|---|---|---|---|
| 2005 | 21 | NC | — | NC | —N/a | —N/a | —N/a |
| 2006 | 22 | 30 | NC | 14 | —N/a | —N/a | —N/a |
| 2007 | 23 | 87 | NC | 52 | —N/a | 43 | —N/a |
| 2008 | 24 | 23 | NC | 7 | —N/a | — | — |
| 2010 | 25 | 81 | NC | 56 | —N/a | — | — |
| 2011 | 26 | 58 | NC | 36 | DNF | — | — |
| 2012 | 27 | 29 | NC | 7 | 54 | — | 31 |
| 2013 | 28 | 72 | NC | 42 | DNF | — | — |
| 2014 | 29 | NC | — | NC | — | — | — |

==== Individual podiums ====
- 2 victories – (2 WC)
- 5 podiums – (4 WC, 1 SWC)

| No. | Season | Date | Location | Race | Level | Place |
|---|---|---|---|---|---|---|
| 1 | 2005–06 | 4 February 2006 | Davos, Switzerland | 1.0 km Sprint F | World Cup | 3rd |
| 2 | 2006–07 | 31 December 2006 | Munich, Germany | 1.1 km Sprint F | Stage World Cup | 3rd |
| 3 | 2007–08 | 26 January 2008 | Canmore, Canada | 1.2 km Sprint F | World Cup | 1st |
| 4 | 2007–08 | 1 March 2008 | Lahti, Finland | 1.2 km Sprint F | World Cup | 1st |
| 5 | 2011–12 | 18 December 2011 | Rogla, Slovenia | 1.0 km Sprint F | World Cup | 2nd |

==== Team podiums ====
- 2 podiums – (2 TS)

| No. | Season | Date | Location | Race | Level | Place | Teammate |
|---|---|---|---|---|---|---|---|
| 1 | 2010–11 | 5 December 2010 | Düsseldorf, Germany | 6 × 0.9 km Team Sprint F | World Cup | 3rd | Gaiazova |
| 2 | 2011–12 | 15 January 2012 | Milan, Italy | 6 × 1.4 km Team Sprint F | World Cup | 3rd | Jones |

== Career highlights ==
Women's cross-country 1.1 kilometre sprint

- Silver – 2011 World Cup, Rogla, Slovenia
- Gold – 2008 World Cup, Lahti, Finland
- Gold – 2008 World Cup, Canmore, Alberta
- Silver – 2007 NorAm Cup, Mont-Sainte-Anne, Quebec
- Bronze – 2006 Tour de Ski, Munich, Germany
- Gold – 2006 Winter Olympics, Turin, Italy
- Bronze – 2006 World Cup, Davos, Switzerland
- Gold – 2005 Canadian Championships, Prince George, British Columbia
- Silver – 2004 Under-23 World Championships, Soldier Hollow, Utah, U.S.

Women's cross-country team relay

- Bronze – 2004 Under-23 World Championships, Soldier Hollow, Utah,

== Honors ==
In 2018, Crawford was awarded the Order of Sport, marking her induction into Canada's Sports Hall of Fame.
