= John Kristian Dahl =

Norwegian cross-country skier

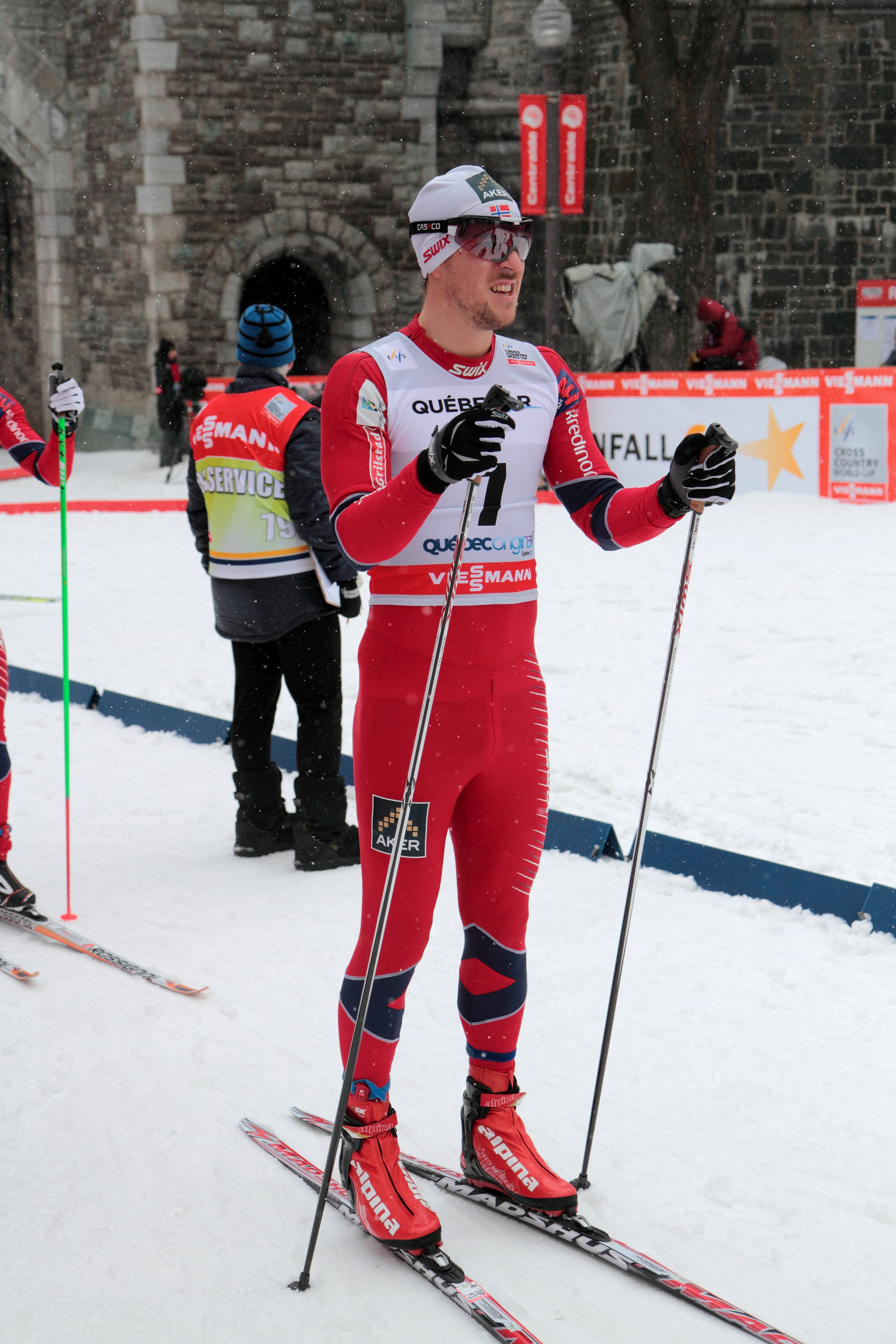
- Dahl during the Cross-Country Skiing World Cup competitions in Quebec City, Canada in December 2012

Personal information
- Nationality: Norway
- Born: 27 March 1981 (age 45) Kirkenes, Norway

Sport
- Sport: Skiing
- Club: Strindheim IL

World Cup career
- Seasons: 14 – (2001–2014)
- Indiv. starts: 137
- Indiv. podiums: 11
- Indiv. wins: 2
- Team starts: 13
- Team podiums: 4
- Team wins: 0
- Overall titles: 0 – (16th in 2009)
- Discipline titles: 0
Medal record
Men's cross-country skiing
Representing Norway
U23 World Championships
Gold medal – first place	2003 Valdidentro	Individual sprint
Junior World Championships
Silver medal – second place	2001 Karpacz	Individual sprint
Bronze medal – third place	2001 Karpacz	4 × 10 km relay

John Kristian Dahl (born 27 March 1981) is a Norwegian cross-country skier who competed between 2001 and 2019. His best World Cup finish was second, three times between 2003 and 2008, all in the sprint event.

On 2 March 2014, he won the annual long-distance cross-country ski race Vasaloppet in Mora, Sweden as the fourth ever Norwegian skier to win. On 6 March 2016, he won it the second time with the time of 4:08:00 and on 5 March 2017, for the third time with the time 3:57:18.

On 10 April 2016, he also won the men's edition of Nordenskiöldsloppet.

On 2 April 2019, he announced his retirement from cross-country skiing.

== Cross-country skiing results ==
All results are sourced from the International Ski Federation (FIS).

=== World Championships ===
Year	Age	15 km individual	30 km skiathlon	50 km mass start	Sprint	4 × 10 km relay	Team sprint
2009	27	—	—	—	15	—	—

=== World Cup ===
==== Season standings ====
Season	Age	Discipline standings			Ski Tour standings		
Season	Age	Overall	Distance	Sprint	Nordic Opening	Tour de Ski	World Cup Final
2001	19	NC	—N/a	NC	—N/a	—N/a	—N/a
2002	20	87	—N/a	42	—N/a	—N/a	—N/a
2003	21	58	—N/a	27	—N/a	—N/a	—N/a
2004	22	26	NC	6	—N/a	—N/a	—N/a
2005	23	51	NC	26	—N/a	—N/a	—N/a
2006	24	59	—	22	—N/a	—N/a	—N/a
2007	25	45	NC	20	—N/a	31	—N/a
2008	26	19	71	3rd place, bronze medalist(s)	—N/a	38	44
2009	27	16	42	4	—N/a	21	63
2010	28	22	NC	7	—N/a	—	DNF
2011	29	38	66	11	DNF	—	33
2012	30	60	77	29	41	—	24
2013	31	62	98	26	DNF	—	—
2014	32	164	—	104	—	—	—

==== Individual podiums ====
- 2 victories – (1 WC, 1 SWC)
- 11 podiums – (9 WC, 2 SWC)

No.	Season	Date	Location	Race	Level	Place
1	2003–04	16 December 2003	Val di Fiemme, Italy	1.2 km Sprint C	World Cup	2nd
2	2003–04	18 February 2004	Stockholm, Sweden	1.1 km Sprint C	World Cup	2nd
3	2005–06	4 February 2006	Davos, Switzerland	1.1 km Sprint F	World Cup	3rd
4	2007–08	27 October 2007	Düsseldorf, Germany	1.5 km Sprint F	World Cup	3rd
5	2007–08	10 February 2008	Otepää, Estonia	1.4 km Sprint C	World Cup	2nd
6	2008–09	29 November 2008	Rukatunturi, Finland	1.4 km Sprint C	World Cup	3rd
7	2008–09	12 March 2009	Trondheim, Norway	1.6 km Sprint C	World Cup	3rd
8	2008–09	18 March 2009	Stockholm, Sweden	1.0 km Sprint C	Stage World Cup	2nd
9	2009–10	13 December 2009	Davos, Switzerland	1.7 km Sprint F	World Cup	1st
10	2009–10	6 February 2010	Canmore, Canada	1.7 km Sprint C	World Cup	2nd
11	2010–11	26 November 2010	Rukatunturi, Finland	1.4 km Sprint C	Stage World Cup	1st

==== Team podiums ====
- 4 podiums – (1 RL, 3 TS)

No.	Season	Date	Location	Race	Level	Place	Teammate(s)
1	2003–04	7 December 2003	Toblach, Italy	6 × 1.2 km Team Sprint F	World Cup	3rd	Solbakken
2	2007–08	17 February 2008	Liberec, Czech Republic	6 × 1.4 km Team Sprint C	World Cup	3rd	Rønning
3	2010–11	17 February 2008	Liberec, Czech Republic	6 × 1.6 km Team Sprint C	World Cup	3rd	Brandsdal
4	2011–12	20 November 2011	Sjusjøen, Norway	4 × 10 km Relay C/F	World Cup	2nd	Ansnes / Eilifsen / Røthe
