= Petra Nováková =

Czech cross-country skier

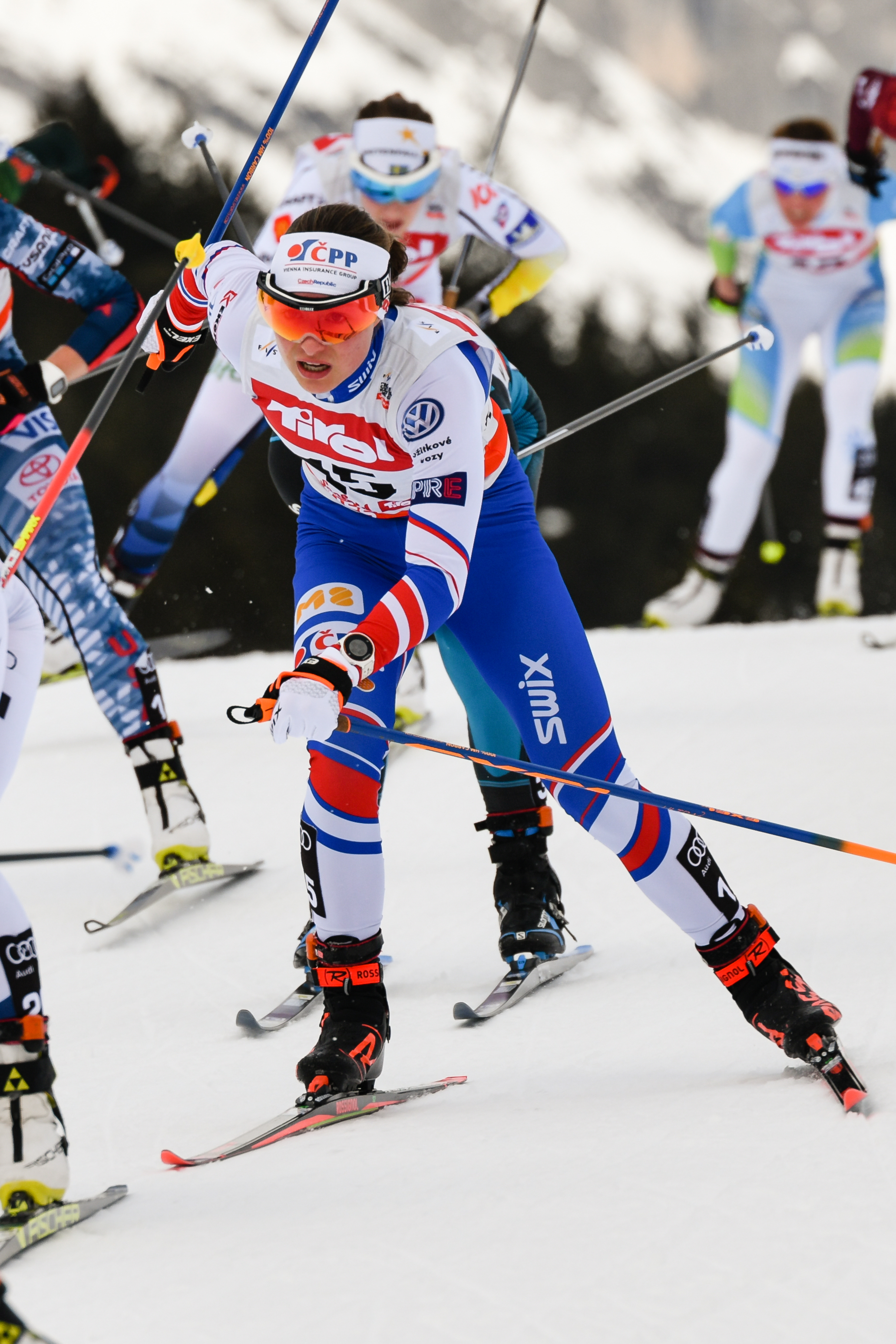
- Petra Nováková in January, 2018

Personal information
- Nationality: Czech Republic
- Born: 17 August 1993 (age 32) Karlovy Vary, Czech Republic

Sport
- Sport: Skiing
- Club: LK Slovan Karlovy Vary

World Cup career
- Seasons: 11 – (2013–present)
- Indiv. starts: 127
- Indiv. podiums: 0
- Team starts: 9
- Team podiums: 0
- Overall titles: 0 – (25th in 2016)
- Discipline titles: 0
Medal record
Women's cross-country skiing
Representing Czech Republic
U23 World Championships
Bronze medal – third place	2016 Râșnov	10 km classical
- Updated on 27 March 2023

Petra Nováková (born 17 August 1993 in Karlovy Vary) is a Czech cross-country skier.

She competed at the FIS Nordic World Ski Championships 2013 in Val di Fiemme. She competed at the 2014 Winter Olympics in Sochi, in the sprint, skiathlon, relay and 30 kilometers. She competed at the 2022 Winter Olympics, in Women's 10 kilometre classical, Women's 30 kilometre freestyle, Women's 15 kilometre skiathlon, and Women's 4 × 5 kilometre relay.

== Cross-country skiing results ==
All results are sourced from the International Ski Federation (FIS).

=== Olympic Games ===
Year	Age	10 km individual	15 km skiathlon	30 km mass start	Sprint	4 × 5 km relay	Team sprint
2014	20	—	35	35	23	9	—
2018	24	28	28	—	—	11	11
2022	28	30	30	DNF	13	—	—

=== World Championships ===
Year	Age	10 km individual	15 km skiathlon	30 km mass start	Sprint	4 × 5 km relay	Team sprint
2013	19	56	—	—	—	12	14
2017	23	—	—	DNF	25	11	—
2019	25	—	28	32	37	11	—
2021	27	—	31	32	46	8	—

=== World Cup ===
==== Season standings ====
Season	Age	Discipline standings			Ski Tour standings				
Season	Age	Overall	Distance	Sprint	Nordic Opening	Tour de Ski	Ski Tour 2020	World Cup Final	Ski Tour Canada
2013	19	NC	NC	—	—	—	—N/a	—	—N/a
2014	20	102	NC	66	58	33	—N/a	—	—N/a
2015	21	58	45	57	23	DNF	—N/a	—N/a	—N/a
2016	22	25	24	39	18	DNF	—N/a	—N/a	17
2017	23	NC	NC	NC	43	DNF	—N/a	—	—N/a
2018	24	32	25	53	—	13	—N/a	—	—N/a
2019	25	105	75	NC	DNF	—	—N/a	—	—N/a
2020	26	56	43	54	29	DNF	—	—N/a	—N/a
2021	27	85	69	69	56	DNF	—N/a	—N/a	—N/a
2022	28	112	84	NC	—N/a	DNF	—N/a	—N/a	—N/a
2023	29	129	118	95	—N/a	—	—N/a	—N/a	—N/a
