= Ronny Fredrik Ansnes =

Norwegian cross-country skier

Personal information
- Nationality: Norway
- Born: 28 June 1989
- Died: 15 July 2018 (aged 29) Meldal Municipality, Norway

Sport
- Sport: Skiing
- Club: Klæbu IL

World Cup career
- Seasons: 3 – (2011–2013)
- Indiv. starts: 4
- Indiv. podiums: 0
- Team starts: 2
- Team podiums: 1
- Team wins: 0
- Overall titles: 0 – (119th in 2011)
- Discipline titles: 0

Ronny Fredrik Ansnes (28 June 1989 – c.15 July 2018) was a Norwegian cross-country skier.

He made his World Cup debut in February 2011 in Drammen, also breaking the top 15-barrier with a 13th place in the 15 kilometre race. He also finished second in a relay race in November 2011 in Sjusjøen. Ansnes also contested the Holmenkollen 50 kilometre race in 2012 and 2013 and a World Cup race in La Clusaz in January 2013 before retiring in 2014. He also won an individual silver medal at the Norwegian Championships, the 15 kilometre race in 2012, as well as a relay bronze medal in 2010.

He hailed from Klæbu Municipality and represented the sports club Byåsen IL.

Ansnes drowned in July 2018 in the Resa river in Resdalen in Meldal Municipality. He was found on 16 July, probably having drowned on the previous day. He was 29.

== Cross-country skiing results ==
All results are sourced from the International Ski Federation (FIS).

=== World Cup ===
Season	Age	Discipline standings			Ski Tour standings		
Season	Age	Overall	Distance	Sprint	Nordic Opening	Tour de Ski	World Cup Final
2011	21	119	70	—	—	—	—
2012	22	NC	NC	—	—	—	—
2013	23	NC	NC	—	—	—	—

==== Team podiums ====
- 1 podium – (1 RL)

No.	Season	Date	Location	Race	Level	Place	Teammates
1	2011–12	20 November 2011	Sjusjøen, Norway	4 × 10 km Relay C/F	World Cup	2nd	Dahl / Eilifsen / Røthe
