= Natalya Korostelyova =

Russian cross-country skier

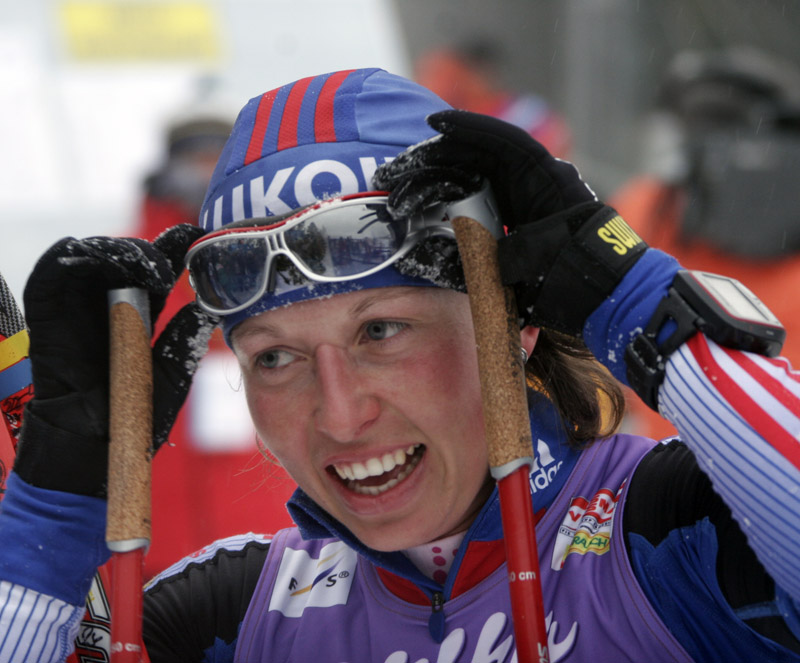
- Korostelyova in 2007

Personal information
- Full name: Natalya Sergeyevna Korostelyova
- Nationality: Russia
- Born: 4 October 1981 (age 45)

Sport
- Sport: Skiing

World Cup career
- Seasons: 12 – (2003, 2005–2015)
- Indiv. starts: 164
- Indiv. podiums: 8
- Indiv. wins: 1
- Team starts: 32
- Team podiums: 6
- Team wins: 1
- Overall titles: 0 – (10th in 2010)
- Discipline titles: 0
Medal record
Women's cross-country skiing
Representing Russia
Olympic Games
Bronze medal – third place	2010 Vancouver	Team sprint
World Championships
Bronze medal – third place	2003 Val di Fiemme	4 × 5 km relay
U23 World Championships
Gold medal – first place	2002 Val di Fiemme	15 km freestyle
Bronze medal – third place	2002 Val di Fiemme	Individual sprint
Military World Games
Gold medal – first place	2017 Sochi	10 km freestyle team
Gold medal – first place	2017 Sochi	Team sprint
Gold medal – first place	2010 Aosta Valley	10 km freestyle
Silver medal – second place	2013 Annecy	10 km freestyle team
New Zealand Winter Games
Gold medal – first place	2011 Wanaka	Individual sprint

Natalya Sergeyevna Korostelyova (Russian: Ната́лья Серге́евна Коростелёва; born 4 October 1981) is a Russian cross country skier who competed between 2002 and 2018. She won a bronze in the team sprint event at the 2010 Winter Olympics in Vancouver.

Korostelyova also won a bronze medal in the 4 × 5 km relay at the FIS Nordic World Ski Championships 2003 in Val di Fiemme and had her best individual finish of ninth in the individual sprint at those same championships.

Korostelyova's lone World Cup victory came at a team sprint event in Germany in 2008. She is also the mother of the cross-country skieer Savely Korostelev.

== Cross-country skiing results ==
All results are sourced from the International Ski Federation (FIS).

=== Olympic Games ===
- 1 medal – (1 bronze)

Year	Age	10 km individual	15 km skiathlon	30 km mass start	Sprint	4 × 5 km relay	Team sprint
2010	28	19	—	—	12	7	Bronze

=== World Championships ===
- 1 medal – (1 bronze)

Year	Age	10 km	15 km	Pursuit	30 km	Sprint	4 × 5 km relay	Team sprint
2003	21	15	—	—	—	9	Bronze	—N/a
2005	23	—	—N/a	—	—	28	—	—
2007	25	10	—N/a	11	28	27	7	—
2009	27	—	—N/a	35	—	10	—	—
2011	29	—	—N/a	—	—	32	—	—
2013	31	—	—N/a	—	—	—	—	7

=== World Cup ===
==== Season standings ====
Season	Age	Discipline standings			Ski Tour standings		
Season	Age	Overall	Distance	Sprint	Nordic Opening	Tour de Ski	World Cup Final
2003	21	17	—N/a	23	—N/a	—N/a	—N/a
2005	23	47	32	56	—N/a	—N/a	—N/a
2006	24	48	48	33	—N/a	—N/a	—N/a
2007	25	22	19	28	—N/a	23	—N/a
2008	26	20	21	19	—N/a	22	—
2009	27	31	33	24	—N/a	—	23
2010	28	10	19	8	—N/a	DNF	19
2011	29	55	NC	34	DNF	—	—
2012	30	25	29	16	18	DNF	DNF
2013	31	44	47	24	DNF	DNF	34
2014	32	87	NC	56	—	—	—
2015	33	109	NC	64	DNF	—	—N/a

==== Individual podiums ====
- 1 victory – (1 SWC)
- 8 podiums – (5 WC, 3 SWC)

No.	Season	Date	Location	Race	Level	Place
1	2007–08	15 December 2007	Rybinsk, Russia	15 km Mass Start F	World Cup	2nd
2	2007–08	16 December 2007	Rybinsk, Russia	1.2 km Sprint F	World Cup	3rd
3	2007–08	4 January 2008	Asiago, Italy	1.2 km Sprint F	Stage World Cup	2nd
4	2009–10	15 December 2009	Düsseldorf, Germany	0.8 km Sprint F	World Cup	2nd
5	2009–10	1 January 2010	Oberhof, Germany	2.8 km Individual F	Stage World Cup	2nd
6	2009–10	4 January 2010	Prague, Czech Republic	1.2 km Sprint F	Stage World Cup	1st
7	2009–10	14 March 2010	Oslo, Norway	1.3 km Sprint F	World Cup	3rd
8	2011–12	2 February 2012	Rybinsk, Russia	1.5 km Sprint F	World Cup	2nd

==== Team podiums ====
- 1 victory – (1 TS)
- 6 podiums – (2 RL, 4 TS)

No.	Season	Date	Location	Race	Level	Place	Teammate(s)
1	2002–03	14 February 2003	Asiago, Italy	6 × 1.4 km Team Sprint F	World Cup	2nd	Sidko
2	2007–08	28 October 2007	Düsseldorf, Germany	6 × 0.8 km Team Sprint F	World Cup	2nd	Matveyeva
3	2007–08	9 December 2007	Davos, Switzerland	4 × 5 km Relay C/F	World Cup	3rd	Kurkina / Rocheva / Chekalyova
4	2008–09	21 December 2008	Düsseldorf, Germany	6 × 0.8 km Team Sprint F	World Cup	1st	Matveyeva
5	2010–11	6 February 2011	Rybinsk, Russia	4 × 5 km Relay C/F	World Cup	3rd	Kasakul / Tikhonova / Ivanova
6	2011–12	4 December 2011	Düsseldorf, Germany	6 × 0.9 km Team Sprint F	World Cup	3rd	Matveyeva
