= Jesper Modin =

Swedish cross-country skier

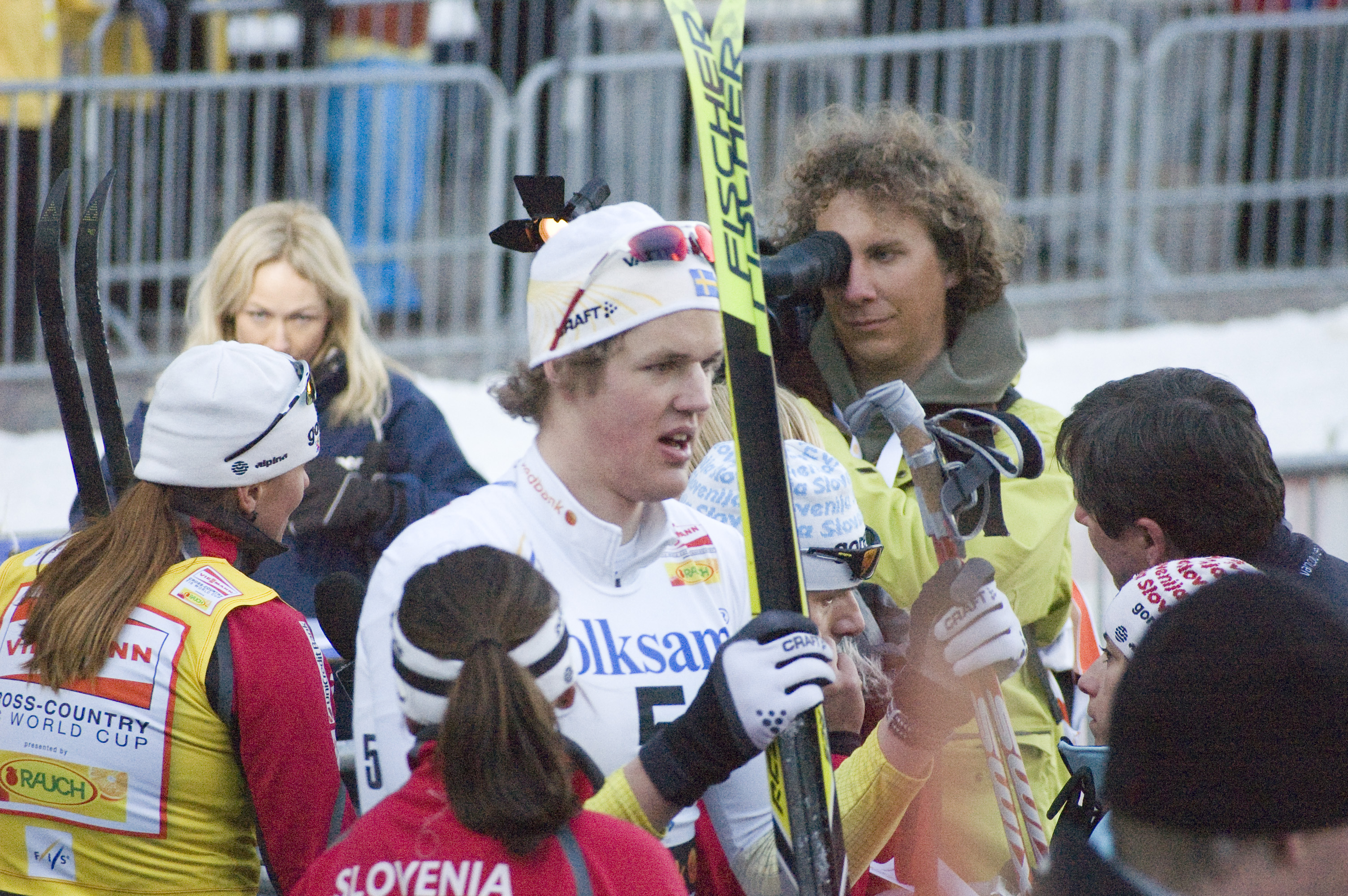
- Jesper Modin in March 2009

Personal information
- Full name: Jesper Olof Modin
- Nationality: Sweden
- Born: 4 June 1988 Selånger, Sweden

Sport
- Sport: Skiing
- Club: Piteå Elit

World Cup career
- Seasons: 7 – (2007, 2009–2012, 2015–2016)
- Indiv. starts: 63
- Indiv. podiums: 1
- Indiv. wins: 0
- Team starts: 8
- Team podiums: 2
- Team wins: 1
- Overall titles: 0 – (22nd in 2011)
- Discipline titles: 0
Medal record
Men's cross-country skiing
Representing Sweden
Junior World Championships
Gold medal – first place	2007 Tarvisio	4 × 5 km relay
Silver medal – second place	2008 Mals	Individual sprint
- Updated on 3 April 2019

Jesper Modin, born June 4, 1988, in Selånger, Sweden is a Swedish cross-country skier who has competed at international top level since 2005. During the 2010 Winter Olympics in Vancouver, he finished 18th in the individual sprint event.

His best World Cup competition finish was third at a sprint event in Rogla, Slovenia in December 2009.

On 7 April 2016 his retirement from cross-country skiing was announced.

== Cross-country skiing results ==
All results are sourced from the International Ski Federation (FIS).

=== Olympic Games ===
Year	Age	15 km individual	30 km skiathlon	50 km mass start	Sprint	4 × 10 km relay	Team sprint
2010	21	—	—	—	18	—	—

=== World Championships ===
Year	Age	15 km individual	30 km skiathlon	50 km mass start	Sprint	4 × 10 km relay	Team sprint
2011	22	—	—	—	5	—	—

=== World Cup ===
==== Season standings ====
Season	Age	Discipline standings			Ski Tour standings			
Season	Age	Overall	Distance	Sprint	Nordic Opening	Tour de Ski	World Cup Final	Ski Tour Canada
2007	18	113	—	54	—N/a	—	—N/a	—N/a
2009	20	60	NC	25	—N/a	—	52	—N/a
2010	21	26	55	19	—N/a	DNF	42	—N/a
2011	22	22	67	3rd place, bronze medalist(s)	DNF	DNF	35	—N/a
2012	23	66	NC	25	47	—	—	—N/a
2015	24	154	94	NC	—	—	—N/a	—N/a
2016	25	NC	NC	NC	—	—	—N/a	—

==== Individual podiums ====
- 1 podium

No.	Season	Date	Location	Race	Level	Place
1	2009–10	19 December 2009	Rogla, Slovenia	1.5 km Sprint C	World Cup	3rd

==== Team podiums ====
- 1 victory – (1 TS)
- 2 podiums – (2 TS)

No.	Season	Date	Location	Race	Level	Place	Teammate
1	2010–11	16 January 2011	Liberec, Czech Republic	6 × 1.6 km Team Sprint C	World Cup	2nd	Larsson
2	2011–12	4 December 2011	Düsseldorf, Germany	6 × 1.7 km Team Sprint F	World Cup	1st	Peterson
