= Jan Pechoušek =

Czech cross-country skier

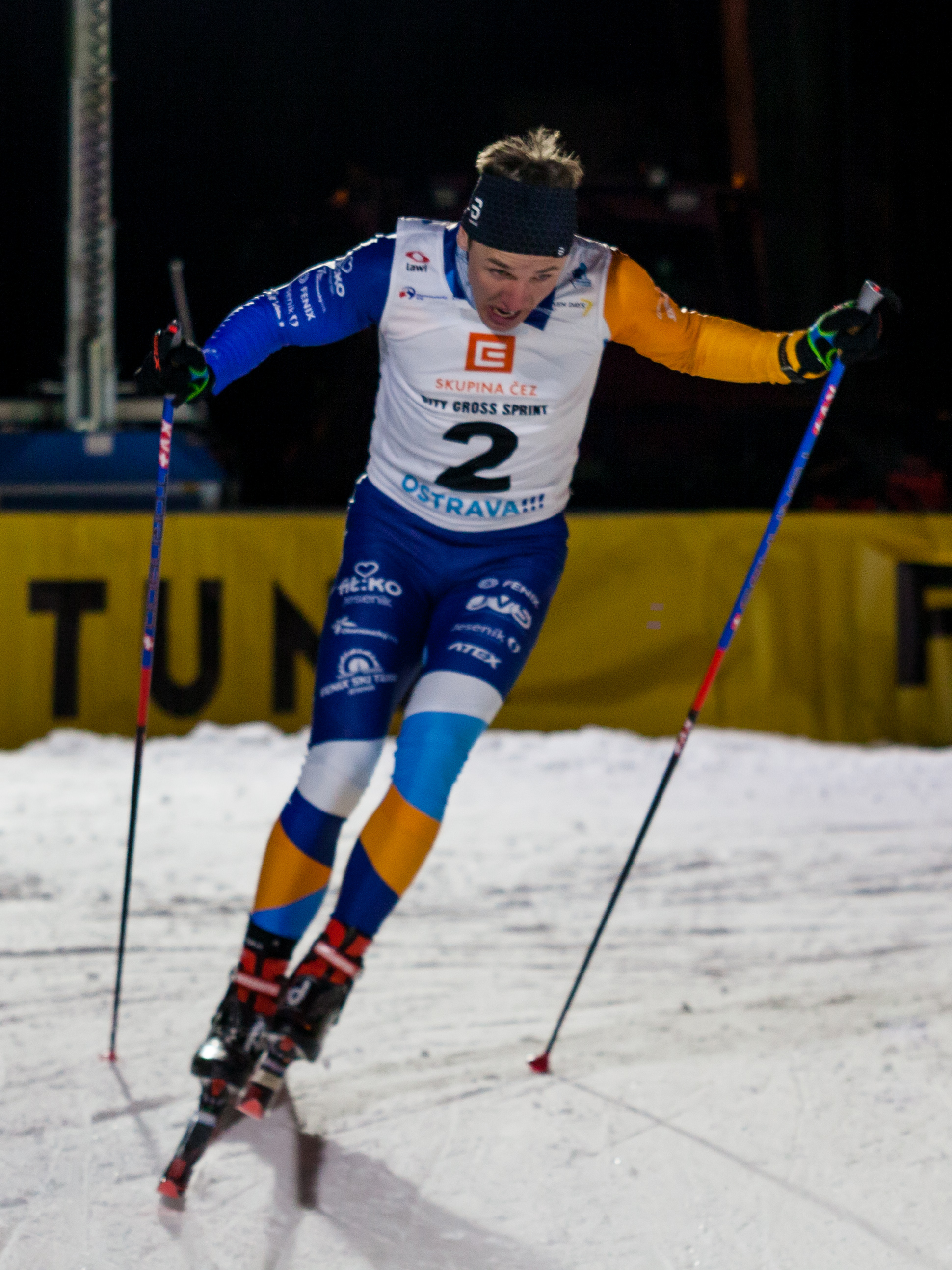
- Jan Pechoušek in 2019

Personal information
- Nationality: Czech Republic
- Born: 4 April 1994 (age 32)
- Height: 1.91 m (6 ft 3 in)

Sport
- Sport: Skiing
- Club: Fenix Ski Team Jeseník

World Cup career
- Seasons: 4 – (2019–2022)
- Indiv. starts: 17
- Indiv. podiums: 0
- Team starts: 4
- Overall titles: 0 – (104th in 2020)
- Discipline titles: 0
- Updated on 29 March 2023

Jan Pechoušek (born 4 April 1997) is a Czech cross-country skier. He competed in the 4 × 10 kilometre relay and the sprint at the 2022 Winter Olympics.

== Cross-country skiing results ==
All results are sourced from the International Ski Federation (FIS).

=== Olympic Games ===
Year	Age	15 km individual	30 km skiathlon	50 km mass start	Sprint	4 × 10 km relay	Team sprint
2022	24	DNS	—	—^{[a]}	33	12	—

^{a} Distance reduced to 30 km due to weather conditions.

=== World Championships ===
Year	Age	15 km individual	30 km skiathlon	50 km mass start	Sprint	4 × 10 km relay	Team sprint
2021	23	—	—	—	41	11	—

=== World Cup ===
==== Season standings ====
Season	Age	Discipline standings				Ski Tour standings			
Season	Age	Overall	Distance	Sprint	U23	Nordic Opening	Tour de Ski	Ski Tour 2020	World Cup Final
2019	21	131	—	83	22	—	DNF	—N/a	—
2020	22	104	—	63	5	DNF	—	—	—N/a
2021	23	117	—	70	—N/a	DNF	—	—N/a	—N/a
2022	24	109	NC	64	—N/a	—N/a	—	—N/a	—N/a
