= Natalya Matveyeva =

Russian cross-country skier

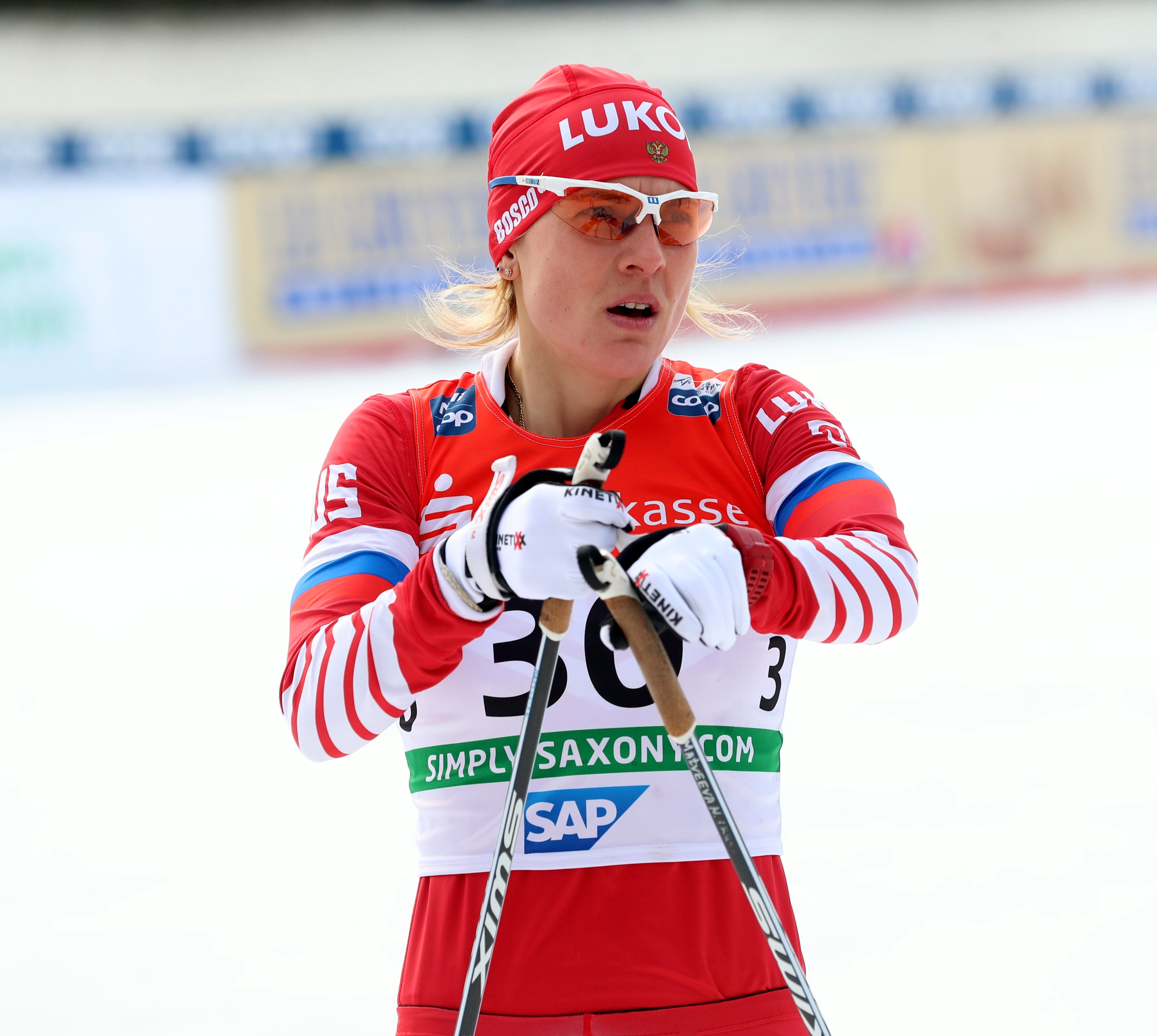

Personal information
- Nationality: Russia
- Born: 23 May 1986 (age 40) Moscow, Soviet Union

Sport
- Sport: Skiing
- Club: Dinamo

World Cup career
- Seasons: 13 – (2006–2009, 2012–2020)
- Indiv. starts: 123
- Indiv. podiums: 12
- Indiv. wins: 2
- Team starts: 23
- Team podiums: 7
- Team wins: 2
- Overall titles: 0 – (17th in 2007)
- Discipline titles: 0
Medal record
Women's cross-country skiing
Representing Russia
World Championships
Silver medal – second place	2017 Lahti	Team sprint
Junior World Championships
Silver medal – second place	2006 Kranj	Individual sprint

Natalya Konstantinovna Matveyeva (Russian: Ната́лья Константи́новна Матве́ева; born 23 May 1986) is a Russian cross-country skier who has been competing since 2004. Matveyeva skis for Dynamo Moscow. She has a total of four victories since 2004, including three in the 2006–2007 season. All four of her victories have been in the sprint events.

== Career ==
As of February 2007, Matveyeva leads the women's sprint category in the 2006–2007 Cross country skiing World Cup going into the FIS Nordic World Ski Championships 2007 in Sapporo, Japan, despite never having won a World Cup event. Her best placing in individual World Cup meets is second-place, which she achieved in the 2006 Changchun and Düsseldorf meets. She competed in the 2006 Winter Olympics in Turin, finishing 30th in the individual sprint.

She tested positive for recombinant EPO (EPO) at a January 2009 meet in Whistler, British Columbia and was suspended provisionally from the sport following the receipt of the confirmation of the V analysis from the World Anti-Doping Agency (WADA) accredited laboratory in Quebec. The case was reviewed and adjudicated by the FIS Doping Panel, chaired by Canadian judge Partick Smith. Matveyeva's results from the most recent results from the world championships in Liberec have not been removed from the official results pending the hearing though she finished fourth in the women's individual sprint event. A verdict was rendered on 23 December 2009 by the FIS that effectively banned her from competition until 12 March 2011 for doping.

In December 2017, she was one of eleven Russian athletes who were banned for life from the Olympics by the International Olympic Committee, after doping offences at the 2014 Winter Olympics. In January 2018, she successfully appealed against the lifetime ban as well as decision to disqualify her from Sochi Olympics at the Court of Arbitration for Sport.

== Cross-country skiing results ==
All results are sourced from the International Ski Federation (FIS).

=== Olympic Games ===
Year	Age	10 km individual	15 km skiathlon	30 km mass start	Sprint	4 × 5 km relay	Team sprint
2006	19	—	—	—	20	—	—
2014	27	—	—	—	30	—	—

=== World Championships ===
- 1 medal – (1 silver)

Year	Age	10 km individual	15 km skiathlon	30 km mass start	Sprint	4 × 5 km relay	Team sprint
2007	20	—	—	—	23	—	12
2009	22	—	—	—	DSQ	—	DSQ
2013	26	—	—	—	21	—	7
2015	28	—	—	—	16	—	5
2017	30	—	—	—	9	—	Silver
2019	32	—	—	—	24	—	—

=== World Cup ===
==== Season standings ====
Season	Age	Discipline standings			Ski Tour standings				
Season	Age	Overall	Distance	Sprint	Nordic Opening	Tour de Ski	Ski Tour 2020	World Cup Final	Ski Tour Canada
2006	19	29	—	13	—N/a	—N/a	—N/a	—N/a	—N/a
2007	20	17	47	3rd place, bronze medalist(s)	—N/a	—	—N/a	—N/a	—N/a
2008	21	21	NC	4	—N/a	—	—N/a	—	—N/a
2009	22	41	NC	19	—N/a	—	—N/a	—	—N/a
2012	25	20	58	5	DNF	DNF	—N/a	—	—N/a
2013	26	64	—	36	—	—	—N/a	—	—N/a
2014	27	59	NC	30	DNF	—	—N/a	—	—N/a
2015	28	32	NC	9	—	—	—N/a	—N/a	—N/a
2016	29	34	66	15	40	DNF	—N/a	—N/a	DNF
2017	30	30	—	7	—	—	—N/a	—	—N/a
2018	31	59	NC	29	46	—	—N/a	47	—N/a
2019	32	46	NC	21	44	—	—N/a	—	—N/a
2020	33	NC	—	NC	—	—	—	—N/a	—N/a

==== Individual podiums ====
- 2 victories – (2 WC)
- 12 podiums – (12 WC)

No.	Season	Date	Location	Race	Level	Place
1	2005–06	22 October 2005	Düsseldorf, Germany	0.8 km Sprint F	World Cup	3rd
2	2006–07	28 October 2006	Düsseldorf, Germany	0.8 km Sprint F	World Cup	2nd
3	2006–07	15 February 2007	Changchun, China	1.1 km Sprint C	World Cup	2nd
4	2007–08	27 October 2007	Düsseldorf, Germany	0.8 km Sprint F	World Cup	1st
5	2007–08	1 March 2008	Lahti, Finland	1.2 km Sprint F	World Cup	2nd
6	2008–09	20 December 2008	Düsseldorf, Germany	0.8 km Sprint F	World Cup	2nd
7	2011–12	3 December 2011	Düsseldorf, Germany	0.9 km Sprint F	World Cup	2nd
8	2011–12	11 December 2011	Davos, Switzerland	1.5 km Sprint F	World Cup	2nd
9	2011–12	21 January 2012	Otepää, Estonia	1.2 km Sprint C	World Cup	3rd
10	2014–15	24 January 2015	Rybinsk, Russia	1.3 km Sprint F	World Cup	2nd
11	2015–16	3 February 2016	Drammen, Norway	1.2 km Sprint C	World Cup	3rd
12	2016–17	14 January 2017	Toblach, Italy	1.3 km Sprint F	World Cup	1st

==== Team podiums ====
- 2 victories – (2 TS)
- 7 podiums – (7 TS)

No.	Season	Date	Location	Race	Level	Place	Teammate
1	2005–06	23 October 2005	Düsseldorf, Germany	6 × 0.8 km Team Sprint F	World Cup	3rd	Sidko
2	2007–08	28 October 2007	Düsseldorf, Germany	6 × 0.8 km Team Sprint F	World Cup	2nd	Korostelyova
3	2007–08	17 February 2008	Liberec, Czech Republic	4 × 1.4 km Team Sprint C	World Cup	3rd	Shapovalova
4	2008–09	21 December 2008	Düsseldorf, Germany	6 × 0.8 km Team Sprint F	World Cup	1st	Korostelyova
5	2011–12	4 December 2011	Düsseldorf, Germany	6 × 0.9 km Team Sprint F	World Cup	3rd	Korostelyova
6	2012–13	3 February 2013	Sochi, Russia	6 × 1.25 km Team Sprint C	World Cup	2nd	Ivanova
7	2016–17	15 January 2017	Toblach, Italy	6 × 1.3 km Team Sprint F	World Cup	1st	Belorukova
