= Teodor Peterson =

Swedish cross-country skier

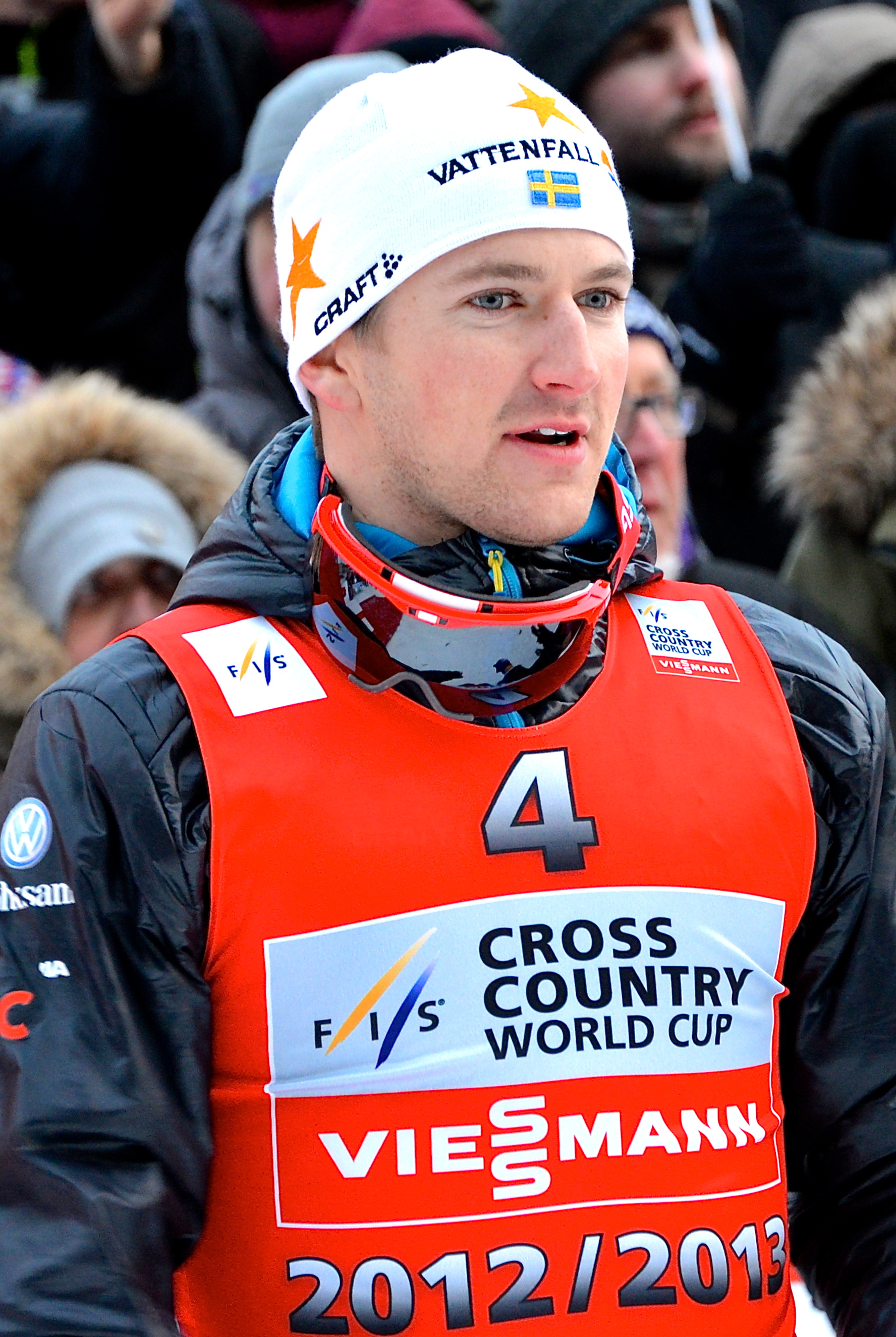
- Teodor Peterson at the Royal Palace Sprint in Stockholm, 2013

Personal information
- Full name: Teodor Anders Peterson
- Nationality: Sweden
- Born: 1 May 1988 (age 38) Umeå, Västerbotten, Sweden
- Height: 186 cm (6 ft 1 in)

Sport
- Sport: Skiing
- Club: Sågmyra SK

World Cup career
- Seasons: 12 – (2009–2020)
- Indiv. starts: 154
- Indiv. podiums: 12
- Indiv. wins: 4
- Team starts: 14
- Team podiums: 4
- Team wins: 1
- Overall titles: 0 – (12th in 2012)
- Discipline titles: 1 – (1 SP: 2012)
Medal record
Men's cross-country skiing
Representing Sweden
Olympic Games
Silver medal – second place	2014 Sochi	Individual sprint
Bronze medal – third place	2014 Sochi	Team sprint

Teodor Anders Peterson (born 1 May 1988 in Umeå) is a Swedish former cross-country skier that had sprint as his best discipline.

== Career ==
He debuted in the World Cup on 7 March 2009 in Lahti in the 2008–09 season.

Peterson made his breakthrough in the 2011–12 season. He won the first sprint race of the season, on 25 November 2011 in Ruka, Finland. The weekend after, in Düsseldorf, he won the team sprint together with Jesper Modin, representing Sweden.

Peterson won his first individual World Cup victory on 2 February 2012 in Moscow.

Peterson also won the overall sprint world cup 2011/2012.

Peterson competed for Sweden in 2010 Winter Olympics in Vancouver. He finished in 11th place in the individual sprint and 15th place in the team sprint together with Marcus Hellner. Peterson also competed for Sweden in the World Championships in Oslo 2011 there, he went out in the quarterfinals and finished in 16th place.

He won silver in the sprint and a bronze in the sprint relay at the 2014 Winter Olympics in Sochi.

== Cross-country skiing results ==
All results are sourced from the International Ski Federation (FIS).

=== Olympic Games ===
- 2 medals – (1 silver, 1 bronze)

Year	Age	15 km individual	30 km skiathlon	50 km mass start	Sprint	4 × 10 km relay	Team sprint
2010	21	—	—	—	11	—	15
2014	25	—	—	—	Silver	—	Bronze
2018	29	—	—	—	9	—	—

=== World Championships ===
Year	Age	15 km individual	30 km skiathlon	50 km mass start	Sprint	4 × 10 km relay	Team sprint
2011	22	—	—	—	16	—	—
2013	24	—	—	—	15	—	—
2015	26	—	—	—	7	—	9
2017	28	—	—	—	24	—	8
2019	30	—	—	—	46	—	—

==== Season titles ====
- 1 title – (1 sprint)

Season
Season	Discipline
2012	Sprint

==== Season standings ====
Season	Age	Discipline standings			Ski Tour standings			
Season	Age	Overall	Distance	Sprint	Nordic Opening	Tour de Ski	World Cup Final	Ski Tour Canada
2009	21	98	NC	53	—N/a	—	58	—N/a
2010	22	36	NC	12	—N/a	DNF	43	—N/a
2011	23	82	—	42	—	—	—	—N/a
2012	24	12	NC	1st place, gold medalist(s)	50	DNF	41	—N/a
2013	25	31	NC	4	66	—	DNF	—N/a
2014	26	19	NC	4	81	—	33	—N/a
2015	27	109	NC	55	72	—	—N/a	—N/a
2016	28	36	NC	12	47	DNF	—N/a	44
2017	29	28	92	12	24	—	31	—N/a
2018	30	44	NC	15	54	—	52	—N/a
2019	31	47	87	24	DNF	DNF	27	—N/a
2020	32	38	NC	12	DNF	—	—N/a	—N/a

==== Individual podiums ====
- 4 victories – (2 WC, 2 SWC)
- 12 podiums – (6 WC, 6 SWC)

No.	Season	Date	Location	Race	Level	Place
1	2011–12	25 November 2011	Rukatunturi, Finland	1.4 km Sprint C	Stage World Cup	1st
2	2011–12	11 December 2011	Davos, Switzerland	1.5 km Sprint F	World Cup	2nd
3	2011–12	14 January 2012	Milan, Italy	1.4 km Sprint F	World Cup	3rd
4	2011–12	2 February 2012	Moscow, Russia	1.5 km Sprint F	World Cup	1st
5	2011–12	4 March 2012	Lahti, Finland	1.4 km Sprint C	World Cup	2nd
6	2011–12	14 March 2012	Stockholm, Sweden	1.0 km Sprint C	Stage World Cup	2nd
7	2012–13	8 December 2012	Quebec City, Canada	1.6 km Sprint F	World Cup	2nd
8	2012–13	12 January 2013	Liberec, Czech Republic	1.6 km Sprint C	World Cup	1st
9	2013–14	29 November 2013	Rukatunturi, Finland	1.4 km Sprint C	Stage World Cup	3rd
10	2013–14	14 March 2014	Falun, Sweden	1.4 km Sprint C	Stage World Cup	1st
11	2016–17	2 December 2016	Lillehammer, Norway	1.6 km Sprint C	Stage World Cup	3rd
12	2017–18	20 January 2018	Planica, Slovenia	1.6 km Sprint C	World Cup	3rd

==== Team podiums ====
- 1 victory – (1 TS)
- 4 podiums – (4 TS)

No.	Season	Date	Location	Race	Level	Place	Teammate
1	2011–12	4 December 2011	Düsseldorf, Germany	6 × 1.7 km Team Sprint F	World Cup	1st	Modin
2	2011–12	15 January 2012	Milan, Italy	6 × 1.4 km Team Sprint F	World Cup	2nd	Halfvarsson
3	2012–13	3 February 2013	Sochi, Russia	6 × 1.8 km Team Sprint C	World Cup	2nd	Jönsson
4	2017–18	14 January 2018	Dresden, Germany	6 × 1.2 km Team Sprint F	World Cup	2nd	Jönsson
