= Ojaste =

Ojaste is an Estonian surname. Notable people with the surname include:

- Kalju Ojaste (born 1961), Estonian biathlete, triathlete and coach
- Triin Ojaste (born 1990), Estonian cross-country skier
