= FIS Nordic World Ski Championships 2013 – Women's team sprint =

Women's team sprint at the FIS Nordic World Ski Championships 2013
- Date: 24 February 2013
- Competitors: 20 from 10 nations
- Winning time: 20:24.4

Medalists
| gold medal | Jessie Diggins; Kikkan Randall | United States |
| silver medal | Charlotte Kalla; Ida Ingemarsdotter | Sweden |
| bronze medal | Riikka Sarasoja-Lilja; Krista Lahteenmäki | Finland |

The women's team sprint was held on 24 February 2013.

== Results ==
=== Semifinals ===
Semifinal 1

| Rank | Heat | Bib | Country | Athletes | Time | Note |
|---|---|---|---|---|---|---|
| 1 | 1 | 1 | Norway | Ingvild Flugstad Østberg; Maiken Caspersen Falla | 21:24.2 | Q |
| 2 | 1 | 2 | Germany | Hanna Kolb; Denise Herrmann | 21:25.5 | Q |
| 3 | 1 | 6 | Italy | Marina Piller; Ilaria Debertolis | 21:25.6 | q |
| 4 | 1 | 3 | Slovenia | Katja Višnar; Vesna Fabjan | 21:30.1 | q |
| 5 | 1 | 8 | Poland | Sylwia Jaśkowiec; Agnieszka Szymańczak | 21:30.2 | q |
| 6 | 1 | 5 | Switzerland | Bettina Gruber; Laurien van der Graaff | 21:58.2 | out |
| 7 | 1 | 4 | Canada | Perianne Jones; Daria Gaiazova | 22:01.7 | out |
| 8 | 1 | 7 | Estonia | Piret Pormeister; Triin Ojaste | 22:22.5 | out |
| 9 | 1 | 10 | Bulgaria | Antoniya Grigorova-Burgova; Teodora Malcheva | 22:57.3 | out |
| 10 | 1 | 9 | Ukraine | Maryna Antsybor; Iryna Leletko | 23:03.2 | out |
| 11 | 1 | 11 | Great Britain | Rosamund Musgrave; Sarah Young | 23:31.5 | out |
| 12 | 1 | 13 | Hungary | Emőke Szőcs; Ildikó Papp | 24:02.5 | out |
| 13 | 1 | 12 | Latvia | Inga Dauškāne; Kitija Auziņa | 24:59.1 | out |

Semifinal 2

| Rank | Heat | Bib | Country | Athletes | Time | Note |
|---|---|---|---|---|---|---|
| 1 | 2 | 14 | United States | Jessie Diggins; Kikkan Randall | 21:17.4 | Q |
| 2 | 2 | 15 | Sweden | Charlotte Kalla; Ida Ingemarsdotter | 21:18.2 | Q |
| 3 | 2 | 16 | Finland | Riikka Sarasoja-Lilja; Krista Lähteenmäki | 21:18.6 | q |
| 4 | 2 | 17 | Russia | Natalya Korostelyova; Natalya Matveyeva | 21:37.5 | q |
| 5 | 2 | 19 | France | Célia Aymonier; Coraline Hugue | 21:40.0 | q |
| 6 | 2 | 23 | China | Li Hongxue; Man Dandan | 22:27.2 | out |
| 7 | 2 | 20 | Czech Republic | Petra Novaková; Eva Vrabcová-Nývltová | 22:28.3 | out |
| 8 | 2 | 18 | Austria | Kerstin Muschet; Kateřina Smutná | 22:38.6 | out |
| 9 | 2 | 21 | Belarus | Ekaterina Rudakova; Valiantsina Kaminskaya | 22:39.1 | out |
| 10 | 2 | 24 | Lithuania | Ingrida Ardišauskaitė; Natalija Kočergina | 23:09.0 | out |
| 11 | 2 | 22 | Kazakhstan | Anna Stoyan; Oxana Yatskaya | 23:14.3 | out |
| 12 | 2 | 25 | Denmark | Niviaq Chemnitz Berthelsen; Signe Schlør | 25:02.6 | out |

=== Final ===
The final was held at 12:00.

| Rank | Bib | Country | Athletes | Time | Deficit |
|---|---|---|---|---|---|
| 1st place, gold medalist(s) | 14 | United States | Jessie Diggins; Kikkan Randall | 20:24.4 | |
| 2nd place, silver medalist(s) | 15 | Sweden | Charlotte Kalla; Ida Ingemarsdotter | 20:32.2 | +7.8 |
| 3rd place, bronze medalist(s) | 16 | Finland | Riikka Sarasoja-Lilja; Krista Lähteenmäki | 20:35.3 | +10.9 |
| 4 | 1 | Norway | Ingvild Flugstad Østberg; Maiken Caspersen Falla | 20:45.2 | +20.8 |
| 5 | 6 | Italy | Marina Piller; Ilaria Debertolis | 20:45.8 | +21.4 |
| 6 | 3 | Slovenia | Katja Višnar; Vesna Fabjan | 20:49.5 | +25.1 |
| 7 | 17 | Russia | Natalya Korostelyova; Natalya Matveyeva | 20:58.4 | +34.0 |
| 8 | 2 | Germany | Hanna Kolb; Denise Herrmann | 20:58.5 | +34.1 |
| 9 | 8 | Poland | Sylwia Jaśkowiec; Agnieszka Szymańczak | 21:10.4 | +46.0 |
| 10 | 19 | France | Célia Aymonier; Coraline Hugue | 21:10.9 | +46.5 |
