= 2011–12 FIS Cross-Country World Cup =

Cross-country skiing competition

Discipline	Men	Women
Overall	(Switzerland) Dario Cologna (3rd title)	(Norway) Marit Bjørgen (3rd title)
Distance	(Switzerland) Dario Cologna	(Norway) Marit Bjørgen
Sprint	(Sweden) Teodor Peterson	(United States) Kikkan Randall
Nations Cup	Norway	Norway
- Nations Cup Overall: Norway

Stage events
Nordic Opening	(Norway) Petter Northug	(Norway) Marit Bjørgen
Tour de Ski	(Switzerland) Dario Cologna	(Poland) Justyna Kowalczyk
World Cup Final	(Switzerland) Dario Cologna	(Norway) Marit Bjørgen

Competition
Locations	21 venues	21 venues
Individual	35 events	35 events
Relay/Team	4 events	4 events

2011–12 FIS Cross-Country World Cup was a multi-race tournament over the season for cross-country skiers. It was the 31st official World Cup season in cross-country skiing for men and women. The season began in Sjusjøen, Norway, on 19 November 2011 and concluded on 18 March 2012 in Falun, Sweden.

This season's biggest event was the Tour de Ski, as there were no World Championships or Olympic Games.

== Calendar ==
=== Men ===
Key: C – Classic / F – Freestyle
WC	Stage	Date	Place	Discipline	Winner	Second	Third	Yellow bib	Ref.
1	1	19 November 2011	(Norway) Sjusjøen (Note: Rescheduled from Beitostølen.)	15 km F	(Sweden) Johan Olsson	(Norway) Petter Northug	(Italy) Roland Clara	(Sweden) Johan Olsson	
	2	25 November 2011	(Finland) Ruka	Sprint C	(Sweden) Teodor Peterson	(Russia) Nikita Kryukov	(Norway) Øystein Pettersen	(Sweden) Johan Olsson	
	3	26 November 2011	(Finland) Ruka	10 km F	(Norway) Petter Northug	(Italy) Roland Clara	(France) Maurice Manificat	(Norway) Petter Northug	
	4	27 November 2011	(Finland) Ruka	15 km C Pursuit	(Kazakhstan) Alexey Poltoranin	(Norway) Eldar Rønning	(Sweden) Daniel Rickardsson	(Sweden) Johan Olsson	
2	2nd Nordic Opening Overall (25–27 November 2011)				(Norway) Petter Northug	(Switzerland) Dario Cologna	(Norway) Eldar Rønning	(Norway) Petter Northug	
3	5	3 December 2011	(Germany) Düsseldorf	Sprint F	(Norway) Ola Vigen Hattestad	(Russia) Alexey Petukhov	(Norway) Pål Golberg		
4	6	10 December 2011	(Switzerland) Davos	30 km F	(Norway) Petter Northug	(France) Maurice Manificat	(Czech Republic) Lukáš Bauer		
5	7	11 December 2011	(Switzerland) Davos	Sprint F	(Russia) Alexey Petukhov	(Sweden) Teodor Peterson	(Sweden) Emil Jönsson		
6	8	17 December 2011	(Slovenia) Rogla	15 km C Mass Start	(Norway) Petter Northug	(Switzerland) Dario Cologna	(Kazakhstan) Alexey Poltoranin		
7	9	18 December 2011	(Slovenia) Rogla	Sprint F	(Switzerland) Dario Cologna	(Russia) Nikolay Morilov	(Norway) Anders Gløersen		
	10	29 December 2011	(Germany) Oberhof	3.75 km F Prologue	(Norway) Petter Northug	(Switzerland) Dario Cologna	(France) Maurice Manificat		
	11	30 December 2011	(Germany) Oberhof	15 km C Pursuit	(Germany) Axel Teichmann	(Norway) Petter Northug	(Switzerland) Dario Cologna		
	12	31 December 2011	(Germany) Oberstdorf	Sprint C	(Russia) Nikita Kryukov	(Russia) Alexey Petukhov	(Russia) Nikolay Morilov		
	13	1 January 2012	(Germany) Oberstdorf	20 km Skiathlon	(Norway) Petter Northug	(Switzerland) Dario Cologna	(Russia) Maxim Vylegzhanin		
	14	3 January 2012	(Italy) Toblach	5 km C	(Russia) Alexander Legkov	(Norway) Eldar Rønning	(Switzerland) Dario Cologna		
	15	4 January 2012	(Italy) Toblach	Sprint F	(Russia) Nikolay Morilov	(Norway) Petter Northug	(Switzerland) Dario Cologna		
	16	5 January 2012	(Italy) Cortina d'Ampezzo–Toblach	35 km F Pursuit	(Switzerland) Dario Cologna	(Norway) Petter Northug	(Russia) Alexander Legkov		
	17	7 January 2012	(Italy) Val di Fiemme	20 km C Mass Start	(Norway) Eldar Rønning	(Canada) Alex Harvey	(Switzerland) Dario Cologna		
	18	8 January 2012	(Italy) Val di Fiemme	9 km F Pursuit; Final Climb	(Russia) Alexander Legkov	(France) Maurice Manificat	(Sweden) Marcus Hellner		
8	6th Tour de Ski Overall (29 December 2011 – 8 January 2012)				(Switzerland) Dario Cologna	(Sweden) Marcus Hellner	(Norway) Petter Northug		
9	19	14 January 2012	(Italy) Milan	Sprint F	(Norway) Eirik Brandsdal	(Germany) Josef Wenzl	(Sweden) Teodor Peterson		
10	20	21 January 2012	(Estonia) Otepää	Sprint C	(Switzerland) Dario Cologna	(Norway) Ola Vigen Hattestad	(Norway) Eirik Brandsdal		
11	21	22 January 2012	(Estonia) Otepää	15 km C	(Switzerland) Dario Cologna	(Czech Republic) Lukáš Bauer	(Canada) Devon Kershaw		
12	22	2 February 2012	(Russia) Moscow	Sprint F	(Sweden) Teodor Peterson	(Norway) Anders Gløersen	(Canada) Devon Kershaw		
13	23	4 February 2012	(Russia) Rybinsk	15 km F Mass Start	(Canada) Devon Kershaw	(Russia) Ilia Chernousov	(Germany) Tobias Angerer		
14	24	5 February 2012	(Russia) Rybinsk	30 km Skiathlon	(Russia) Maxim Vylegzhanin	(Russia) Ilia Chernousov	(Germany) Tobias Angerer		
15	25	11 February 2012	(Czech Republic) Nové Město	30 km C Mass Start	(Sweden) Johan Olsson	(Switzerland) Dario Cologna	(Russia) Maxim Vylegzhanin		
16	26	17 February 2012	(Poland) Szklarska Poręba	Sprint F	(Canada) Devon Kershaw	(Russia) Nikolay Morilov	(Norway) Ola Vigen Hattestad		
17	27	18 February 2012	(Poland) Szklarska Poręba	15 km C	(Sweden) Johan Olsson	(Switzerland) Dario Cologna	(Russia) Alexander Legkov		
18	28	3 March 2012	(Finland) Lahti	30 km Skiathlon	(Switzerland) Dario Cologna	(Norway) Martin Johnsrud Sundby	(Canada) Alex Harvey		
19	29	4 March 2012	(Finland) Lahti	Sprint C	(Sweden) Emil Jönsson	(Sweden) Teodor Peterson	(Russia) Nikita Kryukov		
20	30	7 March 2012	(Norway) Drammen	Sprint C	(Norway) Eirik Brandsdal	(Canada) Len Väljas	(Norway) Pål Golberg		
21	31	10 March 2012	(Norway) Oslo	50 km C Mass Start	(Norway) Eldar Rønning	(Switzerland) Dario Cologna	(Norway) Martin Johnsrud Sundby		
	32	14 March 2012	(Sweden) Stockholm	Sprint C	(Norway) Eirik Brandsdal	(Sweden) Teodor Peterson	(Canada) Len Väljas		
	33	16 March 2012	(Sweden) Falun	3.75 km F	(Canada) Alex Harvey	(Switzerland) Dario Cologna	(Canada) Devon Kershaw		
	34	17 March 2012	(Sweden) Falun	15 km C Mass Start	(Switzerland) Dario Cologna	(Norway) Eldar Rønning	(Canada) Len Väljas		
	35	18 March 2012	(Sweden) Falun	15 km F Pursuit	(Russia) Petr Sedov	(Canada) Alex Harvey	(Italy) Roland Clara		
22	2011–12 World Cup Final (14–18 March 2012)				(Switzerland) Dario Cologna	(Canada) Devon Kershaw	(Norway) Niklas Dyrhaug		

=== Women ===
Key: C – Classic / F – Freestyle
WC	Stage	Date	Place	Discipline	Winner	Second	Third	Yellow bib	Ref.
1	1	19 November 2011	(Norway) Sjusjøen	10 km F	(Norway) Marit Bjørgen	(Sweden) Charlotte Kalla	(Norway) Vibeke Skofterud	(Norway) Marit Bjørgen	
	2	25 November 2011	(Finland) Ruka	Sprint C	(Norway) Marit Bjørgen	(Sweden) Charlotte Kalla	(Norway) Vibeke Skofterud	(Norway) Marit Bjørgen	
	3	26 November 2011	(Finland) Ruka	5 km F	(Norway) Marit Bjørgen	(Sweden) Charlotte Kalla	(Norway) Vibeke Skofterud	(Norway) Marit Bjørgen	
	4	27 November 2011	(Finland) Ruka	10 km C Pursuit	(Norway) Therese Johaug	(Norway) Marit Bjørgen	(Norway) Vibeke Skofterud	(Norway) Marit Bjørgen	
2	2nd Nordic Opening Overall (25–27 November 2011)				(Norway) Marit Bjørgen	(Norway) Therese Johaug	(Norway) Vibeke Skofterud	(Norway) Marit Bjørgen	
3	5	3 December 2011	(Germany) Düsseldorf	Sprint F	(United States) Kikkan Randall	(Russia) Natalya Matveyeva	(Switzerland) Laurien van der Graaff		
4	6	10 December 2011	(Switzerland) Davos	15 km F	(Norway) Marit Bjørgen	(Norway) Vibeke Skofterud	(Norway) Therese Johaug		
5	7	11 December 2011	(Switzerland) Davos	Sprint F	(United States) Kikkan Randall	(Russia) Natalya Matveyeva	(Norway) Maiken Caspersen Falla		
6	8	17 December 2011	(Slovenia) Rogla	10 km C Mass Start	(Poland) Justyna Kowalczyk	(Norway) Therese Johaug	(Norway) Vibeke Skofterud		
7	9	18 December 2011	(Slovenia) Rogla	Sprint F	(Norway) Maiken Caspersen Falla	(Canada) Chandra Crawford	(Sweden) Ida Ingemarsdotter		
	10	29 December 2011	(Germany) Oberhof	2.5 km F Prologue	(Poland) Justyna Kowalczyk	(Norway) Marit Bjørgen	(Sweden) Hanna Brodin		
	11	30 December 2011	(Germany) Oberhof	10 km C Pursuit	(Poland) Justyna Kowalczyk	(Norway) Therese Johaug	(Norway) Marit Bjørgen		
	12	31 December 2011	(Germany) Oberstdorf	Sprint C	(Poland) Justyna Kowalczyk	(Norway) Marit Bjørgen	(Norway) Astrid Uhrenholdt Jacobsen		
	13	1 January 2012	(Germany) Oberstdorf	10 km Skiathlon	(Norway) Marit Bjørgen	(Poland) Justyna Kowalczyk	(Norway) Therese Johaug		
	14	3 January 2012	(Italy) Toblach	3 km C	(Norway) Marit Bjørgen	(Poland) Justyna Kowalczyk	(Norway) Astrid Uhrenholdt Jacobsen		
	15	4 January 2012	(Italy) Toblach	Sprint F	(Norway) Marit Bjørgen	(United States) Kikkan Randall	(Poland) Justyna Kowalczyk		
	16	5 January 2012	(Italy) Toblach	15 km F Pursuit	(Norway) Marit Bjørgen	(Poland) Justyna Kowalczyk	(Norway) Therese Johaug		
	17	7 January 2012	(Italy) Val di Fiemme	10 km C Mass Start	(Poland) Justyna Kowalczyk	(Norway) Marit Bjørgen	(Sweden) Charlotte Kalla		
	18	8 January 2012	(Italy) Val di Fiemme	9 km F Pursuit; Final Climb	(Norway) Therese Johaug	(Poland) Justyna Kowalczyk	(Norway) Marit Bjørgen		
8	6th Tour de Ski Overall (29 December 2011 – 8 January 2012)				(Poland) Justyna Kowalczyk	(Norway) Marit Bjørgen	(Norway) Therese Johaug		
9	19	14 January 2012	(Italy) Milan	Sprint F	(Sweden) Ida Ingemarsdotter	(United States) Kikkan Randall	(Norway) Maiken Caspersen Falla		
10	20	21 January 2012	(Estonia) Otepää	Sprint C	(Poland) Justyna Kowalczyk	(Norway) Marit Bjørgen	(Russia) Natalya Matveyeva		
11	21	22 January 2012	(Estonia) Otepää	10 km C	(Poland) Justyna Kowalczyk	(Norway) Marit Bjørgen	(Norway) Therese Johaug		
12	22	2 February 2012	(Russia) Moscow	Sprint F	(Poland) Justyna Kowalczyk	(Russia) Natalya Korostelyova	(Russia) Anastasia Dotsenko		
13	23	4 February 2012	(Russia) Rybinsk	10 km F Mass Start	(Norway) Marit Bjørgen	(Sweden) Charlotte Kalla	(Norway) Marthe Kristoffersen		
14	24	5 February 2012	(Russia) Rybinsk	15 km Skiathlon	(Norway) Therese Johaug	(Poland) Justyna Kowalczyk	(Norway) Marit Bjørgen		
15	25	11 February 2012	(Czech Republic) Nové Město	15 km C Mass Start	(Norway) Marit Bjørgen	(Poland) Justyna Kowalczyk	(Norway) Therese Johaug		
16	26	17 February 2012	(Poland) Szklarska Poręba	Sprint F	(Sweden) Ida Ingemarsdotter	(Norway) Maiken Caspersen Falla	(United States) Kikkan Randall		
17	27	18 February 2012	(Poland) Szklarska Poręba	10 km C	(Poland) Justyna Kowalczyk	(Norway) Marit Bjørgen	(Norway) Therese Johaug		
18	28	3 March 2012	(Finland) Lahti	15 km Skiathlon	(Norway) Therese Johaug	(Norway) Marit Bjørgen	(Norway) Heidi Weng		
19	29	4 March 2012	(Finland) Lahti	Sprint C	(Norway) Marit Bjørgen	(Russia) Yuliya Ivanova	(Poland) Justyna Kowalczyk		
20	30	7 March 2012	(Norway) Drammen	Sprint C	(Norway) Marit Bjørgen	(Norway) Astrid Jacobsen	(Poland) Justyna Kowalczyk		
21	31	11 March 2012	(Norway) Oslo	30 km C Mass Start	(Norway) Marit Bjørgen	(Poland) Justyna Kowalczyk	(Norway) Therese Johaug		
	32	14 March 2012	(Sweden) Stockholm	Sprint C	(Norway) Marit Bjørgen	(Russia) Yuliya Ivanova	(Norway) Maiken Caspersen Falla		
	33	16 March 2012	(Sweden) Falun	2.5 km F	(Norway) Marit Bjørgen	(Sweden) Charlotte Kalla	(Norway) Marthe Kristoffersen		
	34	17 March 2012	(Sweden) Falun	10 km C Mass Start	(Poland) Justyna Kowalczyk	(Norway) Heidi Weng	(Norway) Therese Johaug		
	35	18 March 2012	(Sweden) Falun	10 km F Pursuit	(Norway) Therese Johaug	(Sweden) Charlotte Kalla	(Norway) Heidi Weng		
22	2011–12 World Cup Final (14–18 March 2012)				(Norway) Marit Bjørgen	(Norway) Heidi Weng	(Sweden) Charlotte Kalla		

=== Men's team ===
WC	Date	Place	Discipline	Winner	Second	Third	Ref.
1	20 November 2011	(Norway) Sjusjøen	4 × 10 km relay C/F	Norway I Eldar Rønning; Finn Hågen Krogh; Lars Berger; Petter Northug	Norway III John Kristian Dahl; Ronny Fredrik Ansnes; Morten Eilifsen; Sjur Røthe	Sweden Marcus Hellner; Daniel Rickardsson; Johan Olsson; Calle Halfvarsson	
2	4 December 2011	(Germany) Düsseldorf	Team Sprint F	Sweden I Jesper Modin; Teodor Peterson	Russia I Nikita Kryukov; Alexey Petukhov	Norway I Pål Golberg; Ola Vigen Hattestad	
3	15 January 2012	(Italy) Milan	Team Sprint F	Russia I Alexey Petukhov; Nikolay Morilov	Sweden I Calle Halfvarsson; Teodor Peterson	Italy I David Hofer; Fulvio Scola	
4	12 February 2012	(Czech Republic) Nové Město	4 × 10 km relay C/F	Norway I Eldar Rønning; Niklas Dyrhaug; Martin Johnsrud Sundby; Petter Northug	Russia I Dmitry Yaparov; Stanislav Volzhentsev; Konstantin Glavatskikh; Maxim Vylegzhanin	Sweden Daniel Rickardsson; Johan Olsson; Anders Södergren; Marcus Hellner	

=== Women's team ===
WC	Date	Place	Discipline	Winner	Second	Third	Ref.
1	20 November 2011	(Norway) Sjusjøen	4 × 5 km relay C/F	Norway I Vibeke Skofterud; Therese Johaug; Kristin Størmer Steira; Marit Bjørgen	Norway II Astrid Uhrenholdt Jacobsen; Ingvild Flugstad Østberg; Tora Berger; Marthe Kristoffersen	Finland Krista Lähteenmäki; Aino-Kaisa Saarinen; Riitta-Liisa Roponen; Riikka Sarasoja-Lilja	
2	4 December 2011	(Germany) Düsseldorf	Team Sprint F	Norway I Mari Eide; Maiken Caspersen Falla	United States I Sadie Bjornsen; Kikkan Randall	Russia I Natalya Korostelyova; Natalya Matveyeva	
3	15 January 2012	(Italy) Milan	Team Sprint F	Sweden I Hanna Brodin; Ida Ingemarsdotter	United States I Jessie Diggins; Kikkan Randall	Canada Perianne Jones; Chandra Crawford	
4	12 February 2012	(Czech Republic) Nové Město	4 × 5 km relay C/F	Norway I Vibeke Skofterud; Therese Johaug; Astrid Uhrenholdt Jacobsen; Marit Bjørgen	Finland Riikka Sarasoja-Lilja; Aino-Kaisa Saarinen; Riitta-Liisa Roponen; Krista Lähteenmäki	Norway II Heidi Weng; Ragnhild Haga; Marthe Kristoffersen; Ingvild Flugstad Østberg	

== Men's standings ==
=== Overall ===
Rank	Athlete	Points
1	Dario Cologna (SUI)	2216
2	Devon Kershaw (CAN)	1466
3	Petter Northug (NOR)	1199
4	Marcus Hellner (SWE)	1058
5	Alexander Legkov (RUS)	1000
6	Alex Harvey (CAN)	974
7	Maxim Vylegzhanin (RUS)	911
8	Maurice Manificat (FRA)	768
9	Ilia Chernousov (RUS)	750
10	Eldar Rønning (NOR)	675

Rank	Athlete	Points
11	Tobias Angerer (GER)	646
12	Teodor Peterson (SWE)	617
13	Lukáš Bauer (CZE)	611
14	Johan Olsson (SWE)	593
15	Nikolay Morilov (RUS)	524
16	Niklas Dyrhaug (NOR)	512
17	Eirik Brandsdal (NOR)	483
18	Roland Clara (ITA)	463
19	Martin Johnsrud Sundby (NOR)	449
20	Alexey Petukhov (RUS)	435

Rank	Athlete	Points
21	Ola Vigen Hattestad (NOR)	426
22	Martin Jakš (CZE)	402
23	Jean-Marc Gaillard (FRA)	382
24	Petr Sedov (RUS)	379
25	Jens Filbrich (GER)	370
26	Alexey Poltoranin (KAZ)	368
27	Sergey Turychev (RUS)	347
28	Len Väljas (CAN)	343
29	Tim Tscharnke (GER)	326
30	Sjur Røthe (NOR)	319

=== Distance ===
Rank	Athlete	Points
1	Dario Cologna (SUI)	1052
2	Devon Kershaw (CAN)	781
3	Alexander Legkov (RUS)	673
4	Maxim Vylegzhanin (RUS)	657
5	Petter Northug (NOR)	619
6	Ilia Chernousov (RUS)	567
7	Alex Harvey (CAN)	546
8	Marcus Hellner (SWE)	536
9	Maurice Manificat (FRA)	508
10	Johan Olsson (SWE)	503

=== Sprint ===
Rank	Athlete	Points
1	Teodor Peterson (SWE)	617
2	Nikolay Morilov (RUS)	494
3	Eirik Brandsdal (NOR)	483
4	Alexey Petukhov (RUS)	435
5	Ola Vigen Hattestad (NOR)	426
6	Dario Cologna (SUI)	404
7	Devon Kershaw (CAN)	303
8	Emil Jönsson (SWE)	277
9	Pål Golberg (NOR)	258
10	Nikita Kriukov (RUS)	257

== Women's standings ==
=== Overall ===
Rank	Athlete	Points
1	Marit Bjørgen (NOR)	2689
2	Justyna Kowalczyk (POL)	2419
3	Therese Johaug (NOR)	1787
4	Charlotte Kalla (SWE)	1376
5	Kikkan Randall (USA)	1307
6	Marthe Kristoffersen (NOR)	1069
7	Krista Lähteenmäki (FIN)	940
8	Aino-Kaisa Saarinen (FIN)	852
9	Astrid Uhrenholdt Jacobsen (NOR)	787
10	Heidi Weng (NOR)	785

Rank	Athlete	Points
11	Vibeke Skofterud (NOR)	707
12	Maiken Caspersen Falla (NOR)	703
13	Katrin Zeller (GER)	631
14	Kristin Størmer Steira (NOR)	616
15	Riitta-Liisa Roponen (FIN)	613
16	Yuliya Ivanova (RUS)	573
17	Nicole Fessel (GER)	561
18	Masako Ishida (JPN)	542
19	Ingvild Flugstad Østberg (NOR)	539
20	Natalya Matveyeva (RUS)	487

Rank	Athlete	Points
21	Anne Kyllönen (FIN)	487
22	Ida Ingemarsdotter (SWE)	475
23	Anna Haag (SWE)	404
24	Riikka Sarasoja-Lilja (FIN)	367
25	Natalya Korostelyova (RUS)	328
26	Anastasia Dotsenko (RUS)	304
27	Polina Medvedeva (RUS)	294
28	Hanna Brodin (SWE)	292
29	Chandra Crawford (CAN)	280
30	Valentyna Shevchenko (UKR)	280

=== Distance ===
Rank	Athlete	Points
1	Marit Bjørgen (NOR)	1448
2	Justyna Kowalczyk (POL)	1324
3	Therese Johaug (NOR)	1231
4	Charlotte Kalla (SWE)	804
5	Marthe Kristoffersen (NOR)	699
6	Vibeke Skofterud (NOR)	522
7	Krista Lähteenmäki (FIN)	492
8	Aino-Kaisa Saarinen (FIN)	488
9	Kristin Størmer Steira (NOR)	484
10	Heidi Weng (NOR)	429

=== Sprint ===
Rank	Athlete	Points
1	Kikkan Randall (USA)	658
2	Maiken Caspersen Falla (NOR)	536
3	Marit Bjørgen (NOR)	521
4	Justyna Kowalczyk (POL)	515
5	Natalya Matveyeva (RUS)	469
6	Ida Ingemarsdotter (SWE)	416
7	Chandra Crawford (CAN)	280
8	Ingvild Flugstad Østberg (NOR)	266
9	Anne Kyllönen (FIN)	256
10	Vesna Fabjan (SLO)	252

== Nations Cup ==
=== Overall ===
Rank	Nation	Points
1	Norway	16702
2	Russia	9627
3	Sweden	7394
4	Finland	5590
5	Germany	4046
6	Canada	3560
7	Switzerland	3157
8	United States	2734
9	Italy	2698
10	France	2556

=== Men ===
Rank	Nation	Points
1	Russia	6814
2	Norway	6034
3	Sweden	3991
4	Canada	2990
5	Switzerland	2804
6	Germany	2133
7	Italy	2066
8	France	1762
9	Finland	1314
10	Czech Republic	1222

=== Women ===
Rank	Nation	Points
1	Norway	10668
2	Finland	4276
3	Sweden	3403
4	Russia	2813
5	Poland	2489
6	United States	2211
7	Germany	1913
8	France	794
9	Slovenia	691
10	Italy	632

== Points distribution ==
The table shows the number of points won in the 2011–12 Cross-Country Skiing World Cup for men and women.

Place	1	2	3	4	5	6	7	8	9	10	11	12	13	14	15	16	17	18	19	20	21	22	23	24	25	26	27	28	29	30
Individual	100	80	60	50	45	40	36	32	29	26	24	22	20	18	16	15	14	13	12	11	10	9	8	7	6	5	4	3	2	1
Team Sprint	100	80	60	50	45	40	36	32	29	26	24	22	20	18	16	15	14	13	12	11	10	9	8	7	6	5	4	3	2	1
Nordic Opening	200	160	120	100	90	80	72	64	58	52	48	44	40	36	32	30	28	26	24	22	20	18	16	14	12	10	8	6	4	2
World Cup Final	200	160	120	100	90	80	72	64	58	52	48	44	40	36	32	30	28	26	24	22	20	18	16	14	12	10	8	6	4	2
Relay	200	160	120	100	90	80	72	64	58	52	48	44	40	36	32	30	28	26	24	22	20	18	16	14	12	10	8	6	4	2
Tour de Ski	400	320	240	200	180	160	144	128	116	104	96	88	80	72	64	60	56	52	48	44	40	36	32	28	24	20	16	12	8	4
Stage Nordic Opening	50	46	43	40	37	34	32	30	28	26	24	22	20	18	16	15	14	13	12	11	10	9	8	7	6	5	4	3	2	1
Stage Tour de Ski	50	46	43	40	37	34	32	30	28	26	24	22	20	18	16	15	14	13	12	11	10	9	8	7	6	5	4	3	2	1
Stage World Cup Final	50	46	43	40	37	34	32	30	28	26	24	22	20	18	16	15	14	13	12	11	10	9	8	7	6	5	4	3	2	1
Bonus points	15	12	10	8	6	5	4	3	2	1

A skier's best results in all distance races and sprint races counts towards the overall World Cup totals.

All distance races, included individual stages in Tour de Ski and in World Cup Final (which counts as 50% of a normal race), count towards the distance standings. All sprint races, including the sprint races during the Tour de Ski and the first race of the World Cup final (which counts as 50% of a normal race), count towards the sprint standings.

In mass start races bonus points are awarded to the first 10 at each bonus station.

The Nations Cup ranking is calculated by adding each country's individual competitors' scores and scores from team events. Relay events count double (see World Cup final positions), with only one team counting towards the total, while in team sprint events two teams contribute towards the total, with the usual World Cup points (100 to winning team, etc.) awarded.

== Achievements ==
First World Cup career victory

Men

- Teodor Peterson (SWE), 23, in his 4th season – the WC 2 (Sprint C) in Ruka; also first podium
- Alex Harvey (CAN), 23, in his 5th season – the WC 33 (3.75 km F) in Falun; first podium was 2008–09 WC 26 (50 km C Mass Start) in Trondheim
- Petr Sedov (RUS), 21, in his 4th season – the WC 34 (15 km F Handicap Start) in Falun; also first podium

Women

- Maiken Caspersen Falla (NOR), 21, in her 4th season – the WC 7 (Sprint F) in Rogla; first podium was 2008–09 WC 7 (Sprint F) in Düsseldorf
- Ida Ingemarsdotter (SWE), 26, in her 9th season – the WC 9 (Sprint F) in Milan; first podium was 2009–10 WC 15 (Sprint C) in Canmore

First World Cup podium

Men

- Roland Clara (ITA), 29, in his 8th season – no. 3 in the WC 1 (15 km F Individual) in Sjusjoen
- Teodor Peterson (SWE), 23, in his 4th season – no. 1 in the WC 2 (Sprint C) in Ruka
- Len Väljas (CAN), 23, in his 4th season – no. 2 in the WC 20 (Sprint C) in Drammen
- Petr Sedov (RUS), 21, in his 4th season – no. 1 in the WC 34 (15 km F Handicap Start) in Falun

Women

- Laurien van der Graaff (SUI), 24, in her 5th season – no. 3 in the WC 3 (Sprint F) in Düsseldorf
- Anastasia Dotsenko (RUS), 25, in her 2nd season – no. 3 in the WC 12 (Sprint F) in Moscow
- Yuliya Ivanova (RUS), 26, in her 6th season – no.2 in the WC 19 (Sprint C) in Lahti

Victories in this World Cup (all-time number of victories as of 2011–12 season in parentheses)

Men

- Dario Cologna (SUI), 8 (18) first places
- Petter Northug (NOR), 6 (24) first places
- Johan Olsson (SWE), 3 (4) first places
- Eirik Brandsdal (NOR), 3 (4) first places
- Eldar Rønning (NOR), 2 (10) first places
- Alexander Legkov (RUS), 2 (5) first places
- Devon Kershaw (CAN), 2 (2) first places
- Teodor Peterson (SWE), 2 (2) first places
- Axel Teichmann (GER), 1 (13) first place
- Ola Vigen Hattestad (NOR), 1 (11) first place
- Emil Jönsson (SWE), 1 (10) first place
- Alexey Petukhov (RUS), 1 (3) first place
- Nikolay Morilov (RUS), 1 (3) first place
- Nikita Kryukov (RUS), 1 (2) first place
- Alexey Poltoranin (KAZ), 1 (2) first place
- Maxim Vylegzhanin (RUS), 1 (2) first place
- Alex Harvey (CAN), 1 (1) first place
- Petr Sedov (RUS), 1 (1) first place

Women

- Marit Bjørgen (NOR), 17 (69) first places
- Justyna Kowalczyk (POL), 11 (33) first places
- Kikkan Randall (USA), 2 (5) first places
- Therese Johaug (NOR), 5 (9) first places
- Ida Ingemarsdotter (SWE), 2 (2) first places
- Maiken Caspersen Falla (NOR), 1 (1) first place
