= 2012–13 FIS Cross-Country World Cup =

Cross-country skiing competition

| Discipline | Men | Women |
| Overall | (Norway) Petter Northug (2nd title) | (Poland) Justyna Kowalczyk (4th title) |
| Distance | (Russia) Alexander Legkov | (Poland) Justyna Kowalczyk |
| Sprint | (Sweden) Emil Jönsson | (United States) Kikkan Randall |
| Nations Cup | Norway | Norway |
- Nations Cup Overall: Norway

Stage events
| Nordic Opening | (Norway) Petter Northug | (Norway) Marit Bjørgen |
| Tour de Ski | (Russia) Alexander Legkov | (Poland) Justyna Kowalczyk |
| World Cup Final | (Norway) Petter Northug | (Norway) Marit Bjørgen |

Competition
| Locations | 18 venues | 18 venues |
| Individual | 29 events | 29 events |
| Relay/Team | 5 events | 5 events |

2012–13 FIS Cross-Country World Cup was a multi-race tournament over the season for cross-country skiers. It was the 32nd official World Cup season in cross-country skiing for men and women. The season started on 24 November 2012 in Gällivare, Sweden, and ended on 24 March 2013 in Falun, Sweden.

This season's biggest event was the Tour de Ski and the 2013 World Championships.

== Calendar ==
=== Men ===
Key: C – Classic / F – Freestyle
| WC | Stage | Date | Place | Discipline | Winner | Second | Third | Yellow bib | Ref. |
|---|---|---|---|---|---|---|---|---|---|
| 1 | 1 | 24 November 2012 | (Sweden) Gällivare | 15 km F | (Norway) Martin Johnsrud Sundby | (Kazakhstan) Alexey Poltoranin | (Sweden) Marcus Hellner | (Norway) Martin Johnsrud Sundby | |
| | 2 | 30 November 2012 | (Finland) Ruka | Sprint C | (Russia) Nikita Kryukov | (Norway) Petter Northug | (Norway) Eirik Brandsdal | (Kazakhstan) Alexey Poltoranin | |
| | 3 | 1 December 2012 | (Finland) Ruka | 10 km F | (Russia) Alexander Legkov | (Norway) Petter Northug | (France) Maurice Manificat | (Kazakhstan) Alexey Poltoranin | |
| | 4 | 2 December 2012 | (Finland) Ruka | 15 km C Pursuit | (Russia) Maxim Vylegzhanin | (Switzerland) Dario Cologna | (Norway) Martin Johnsrud Sundby | (Kazakhstan) Alexey Poltoranin | |
| 2 | 3rd Nordic Opening Overall (30 November – 2 December 2012) | | | | (Norway) Petter Northug | (Russia) Maxim Vylegzhanin | (Kazakhstan) Alexey Poltoranin | (Norway) Petter Northug | |
| 3 | 5 | 8 December 2012 | (Canada) Quebec | Sprint F | (Sweden) Emil Jönsson | (Sweden) Teodor Peterson | (Russia) Alexey Petukhov | (Norway) Petter Northug | |
| 4 | 6 | 13 December 2012 | (Canada) Canmore | 15 km C Mass Start | (Germany) Tim Tscharnke | (Norway) Sjur Røthe | (Germany) Tobias Angerer | (Norway) Petter Northug | |
| 5 | 7 | 15 December 2012 | (Canada) Canmore | Sprint F | (Sweden) Emil Jönsson | (Norway) Anders Gløersen | (Russia) Nikita Kryukov | (Sweden) Emil Jönsson | |
| 6 | 8 | 16 December 2012 | (Canada) Canmore | 30 km Skiathlon | (France) Maurice Manificat | (Italy) Roland Clara | (Norway) Sjur Røthe | (Sweden) Emil Jönsson | |
| | 9 | 29 December 2012 | (Germany) Oberhof | 4 km F Prologue | (Norway) Petter Northug | (Sweden) Marcus Hellner | (Russia) Alexander Legkov | (Norway) Petter Northug | |
| | 10 | 30 December 2012 | (Germany) Oberhof | 15 km C Pursuit | (Russia) Maxim Vylegzhanin | (Russia) Alexander Legkov | (Norway) Petter Northug | (Norway) Petter Northug | |
| | 11 | 1 January 2013 | (Switzerland) Val Müstair | Sprint F | (Norway) Finn Hågen Krogh | (Italy) Federico Pellegrino | (Canada) Len Väljas | (Norway) Petter Northug | |
| | 12 | 3 January 2013 | (Italy) Cortina–Toblach | 35 km F Pursuit | (Norway) Petter Northug | (Russia) Alexander Legkov | (Switzerland) Dario Cologna | (Norway) Petter Northug | |
| | 13 | 4 January 2013 | (Italy) Toblach | 5 km C | (Kazakhstan) Alexey Poltoranin | (Norway) Petter Northug | (Switzerland) Dario Cologna | (Norway) Petter Northug | |
| | 14 | 5 January 2013 | (Italy) Val di Fiemme | 15 km C Mass Start | (Kazakhstan) Alexey Poltoranin | (Canada) Len Väljas | (Canada) Alex Harvey | (Norway) Petter Northug | |
| | 15 | 6 January 2013 | (Italy) Val di Fiemme | 9 km F Pursuit; Final Climb | (Sweden) Marcus Hellner | (Canada) Ivan Babikov | (Italy) Roland Clara | (Norway) Petter Northug | |
| 7 | 7th Tour de Ski (29 December 2012 – 6 January 2013) | | | | (Russia) Alexander Legkov | (Switzerland) Dario Cologna | (Russia) Maxim Vylegzhanin | (Russia) Alexander Legkov | |
| 8 | 16 | 12 January 2013 | (Czech Republic) Liberec | Sprint C | (Sweden) Teodor Peterson | (Sweden) Emil Jönsson | (Norway) Pål Golberg | (Russia) Alexander Legkov | |
| 9 | 17 | 19 January 2013 | (France) La Clusaz | 15 km C Mass Start | (Kazakhstan) Alexey Poltoranin | (Russia) Alexander Bessmertnykh | (Switzerland) Dario Cologna | (Russia) Alexander Legkov | |
| 10 | 18 | 1 February 2013 | (Russia) Sochi | Sprint F | (Norway) Petter Northug | (Switzerland) Dario Cologna | (Italy) David Hofer | (Switzerland) Dario Cologna | |
| 11 | 19 | 2 February 2013 | (Russia) Sochi | 30 km Skiathlon | (Switzerland) Dario Cologna | (Russia) Ilia Chernousov | (Russia) Alexander Legkov | (Switzerland) Dario Cologna | |
| 12 | 20 | 16 February 2013 | (Switzerland) Davos | Sprint C | (Kazakhstan) Alexey Poltoranin | (Switzerland) Dario Cologna | (Italy) Federico Pellegrino | (Switzerland) Dario Cologna | |
| 13 | 21 | 17 February 2013 | (Switzerland) Davos | 15 km F | (Sweden) Johan Olsson | (Switzerland) Dario Cologna | (Russia) Alexander Legkov | (Switzerland) Dario Cologna | |
FIS Nordic World Ski Championships 2013 (20 February–3 March)
| 14 | 22 | 9 March 2013 | (Finland) Lahti | Sprint F | (Sweden) Emil Jönsson | (Norway) Ola Vigen Hattestad | (Norway) Finn Hågen Krogh | (Switzerland) Dario Cologna | |
| 15 | 23 | 10 March 2013 | (Finland) Lahti | 15 km C | (Norway) Petter Northug | (Kazakhstan) Alexey Poltoranin | (Norway) Martin Johnsrud Sundby | (Switzerland) Dario Cologna | |
| 16 | 24 | 13 March 2013 | (Norway) Drammen | Sprint C | (Norway) Petter Northug | (Kazakhstan) Alexey Poltoranin | (Russia) Nikita Kryukov | (Switzerland) Dario Cologna | |
| 17 | 25 | 16 March 2013 | (Norway) Oslo | 50 km F Mass Start | (Russia) Alexander Legkov | (Norway) Martin Johnsrud Sundby | (Russia) Ilia Chernousov | (Russia) Alexander Legkov | |
| | 26 | 20 March 2013 | (Sweden) Stockholm | Sprint C | (Norway) Petter Northug | (Norway) Eirik Brandsdal | (Russia) Nikita Kryukov | (Norway) Petter Northug | |
| | 27 | 22 March 2013 | (Sweden) Falun | 2.5 km F Prologue | (Norway) Petter Northug | (Norway) Pål Golberg | (Norway) Anders Gløersen | (Norway) Petter Northug | |
| | 28 | 23 March 2013 | (Sweden) Falun | 15 km C Mass Start | (Norway) Eldar Rønning | (Russia) Maxim Vylegzhanin | (Norway) Martin Johnsrud Sundby | (Norway) Petter Northug | |
| | 29 | 24 March 2013 | (Sweden) Falun | 15 km F Pursuit | (Norway) Finn Hågen Krogh | (Norway) Martin Johnsrud Sundby | (Russia) Alexander Legkov | (Norway) Petter Northug | |
| 18 | 2012–13 World Cup Final (20–24 March 2013) | | | | (Norway) Petter Northug | (Norway) Finn Hågen Krogh | (Norway) Martin Johnsrud Sundby | (Norway) Petter Northug | |

=== Women ===
Key: C – Classic / F – Freestyle
| WC | Stage | Date | Place | Discipline | Winner | Second | Third | Yellow bib | Ref. |
|---|---|---|---|---|---|---|---|---|---|
| 1 | 1 | 24 November 2012 | (Sweden) Gällivare | 10 km F | (Norway) Marit Bjørgen | (Norway) Therese Johaug | (United States) Kikkan Randall | (Norway) Marit Bjørgen | |
| | 2 | 30 November 2012 | (Finland) Ruka | Sprint C | (Norway) Marit Bjørgen | (Russia) Yevgeniya Shapovalova | (Russia) Anastasia Dotsenko | (Norway) Marit Bjørgen | |
| | 3 | 1 December 2012 | (Finland) Ruka | 5 km F | (Norway) Marit Bjørgen | (United States) Kikkan Randall | (Russia) Yuliya Chekalyova | (Norway) Marit Bjørgen | |
| | 4 | 2 December 2012 | (Finland) Ruka | 10 km C Pursuit | (Norway) Marit Bjørgen | (Norway) Therese Johaug | (Norway) Heidi Weng | (Norway) Marit Bjørgen | |
| 2 | 3rd Nordic Opening Overall (30 November – 2 December 2012) | | | | (Norway) Marit Bjørgen | (Poland) Justyna Kowalczyk | (Norway) Heidi Weng | (Norway) Marit Bjørgen | |
| 3 | 5 | 8 December 2012 | (Canada) Quebec | Sprint F | (United States) Kikkan Randall | (Norway) Maiken Caspersen Falla | (Sweden) Ida Ingemarsdotter | (Norway) Marit Bjørgen | |
| 4 | 6 | 13 December 2012 | (Canada) Canmore | 10 km C Mass Start | (Poland) Justyna Kowalczyk | (Finland) Anne Kyllönen | (Norway) Maiken Caspersen Falla | (Norway) Marit Bjørgen | |
| 5 | 7 | 15 December 2012 | (Canada) Canmore | Sprint F | (Norway) Maiken Caspersen Falla | (United States) Kikkan Randall | (Norway) Celine Brun-Lie | (Norway) Marit Bjørgen | |
| 6 | 8 | 16 December 2012 | (Canada) Canmore | 15 km Skiathlon | (Poland) Justyna Kowalczyk | (Finland) Anne Kyllönen | (Norway) Vibeke Skofterud | (Poland) Justyna Kowalczyk | |
| | 9 | 29 December 2012 | (Germany) Oberhof | 3 km F Prologue | (United States) Kikkan Randall | (Sweden) Charlotte Kalla | (Poland) Justyna Kowalczyk | (Poland) Justyna Kowalczyk | |
| | 10 | 30 December 2012 | (Germany) Oberhof | 9 km C Pursuit | (Poland) Justyna Kowalczyk | (Norway) Therese Johaug | (Finland) Anne Kyllönen | (Poland) Justyna Kowalczyk | |
| | 11 | 1 January 2013 | (Switzerland) Val Müstair | Sprint F | (United States) Kikkan Randall | (Norway) Ingvild Flugstad Østberg | (Norway) Heidi Weng | (Poland) Justyna Kowalczyk | |
| | 12 | 3 January 2013 | (Italy) Toblach | 15 km F Pursuit | (Poland) Justyna Kowalczyk | (Sweden) Charlotte Kalla | (Norway) Therese Johaug | (Poland) Justyna Kowalczyk | |
| | 13 | 4 January 2013 | (Italy) Toblach | 3.3 km C | (Poland) Justyna Kowalczyk | (Finland) Krista Lähteenmäki | (Norway) Astrid Uhrenholdt Jacobsen | (Poland) Justyna Kowalczyk | |
| | 14 | 5 January 2013 | (Italy) Val di Fiemme | 10 km C Mass Start | (Poland) Justyna Kowalczyk | (Norway) Kristin Størmer Steira | (Finland) Krista Lähteenmäki | (Poland) Justyna Kowalczyk | |
| | 15 | 6 January 2013 | (Italy) Val di Fiemme | 9 km F Pursuit; Final Climb | (Norway) Therese Johaug | (United States) Elizabeth Stephen | (Norway) Heidi Weng | (Poland) Justyna Kowalczyk | |
| 7 | 7th Tour de Ski (29 December 2012 – 6 January 2013) | | | | (Poland) Justyna Kowalczyk | (Norway) Therese Johaug | (Norway) Kristin Størmer Steira | (Poland) Justyna Kowalczyk | |
| 8 | 16 | 12 January 2013 | (Czech Republic) Liberec | Sprint C | (Finland) Mona-Liisa Malvalehto | (Poland) Justyna Kowalczyk | (Norway) Maiken Caspersen Falla | (Poland) Justyna Kowalczyk | |
| 9 | 17 | 19 January 2013 | (France) La Clusaz | 10 km C Mass Start | (Norway) Marit Bjørgen | (Norway) Therese Johaug | (Poland) Justyna Kowalczyk | (Poland) Justyna Kowalczyk | |
| 10 | 18 | 1 February 2013 | (Russia) Sochi | Sprint F | (United States) Kikkan Randall | (France) Aurore Jéan | (Norway) Celine Brun-Lie | (Poland) Justyna Kowalczyk | |
| 11 | 19 | 2 February 2013 | (Russia) Sochi | 15 km Skiathlon | (Norway) Kristin Størmer Steira | (Russia) Yuliya Chekalyova | (Germany) Nicole Fessel | (Poland) Justyna Kowalczyk | |
| 12 | 20 | 16 February 2013 | (Switzerland) Davos | Sprint C | (Poland) Justyna Kowalczyk | (Norway) Marit Bjørgen | (Finland) Anne Kyllönen | (Poland) Justyna Kowalczyk | |
| 13 | 21 | 17 February 2013 | (Switzerland) Davos | 10 km F | (Norway) Therese Johaug | (Poland) Justyna Kowalczyk | (Norway) Kristin Størmer Steira | (Poland) Justyna Kowalczyk | |
FIS Nordic World Ski Championships 2013 (20 February–3 March)
| 14 | 22 | 9 March 2013 | (Finland) Lahti | Sprint F | (United States) Kikkan Randall | (Norway) Marit Bjørgen | (Slovakia) Alena Procházková | (Poland) Justyna Kowalczyk | |
| 15 | 23 | 10 March 2013 | (Finland) Lahti | 10 km C | (Poland) Justyna Kowalczyk | (Norway) Marit Bjørgen | (Norway) Heidi Weng | (Poland) Justyna Kowalczyk | |
| 16 | 24 | 13 March 2013 | (Norway) Drammen | Sprint C | (Poland) Justyna Kowalczyk | (Norway) Heidi Weng | (Norway) Ingvild Flugstad Østberg | (Poland) Justyna Kowalczyk | |
| 17 | 25 | 17 March 2013 | (Norway) Oslo | 30 km F Mass Start | (Norway) Therese Johaug | (Poland) Justyna Kowalczyk | (Russia) Yuliya Chekalyova | (Poland) Justyna Kowalczyk | |
| | 26 | 20 March 2013 | (Sweden) Stockholm | Sprint C | (Poland) Justyna Kowalczyk | (Norway) Marit Bjørgen | (Finland) Kerttu Niskanen | (Poland) Justyna Kowalczyk | |
| | 27 | 22 March 2013 | (Sweden) Falun | 2.5 km F Prologue | (Norway) Marit Bjørgen | (Sweden) Charlotte Kalla | (United States) Kikkan Randall | (Poland) Justyna Kowalczyk | |
| | 28 | 23 March 2013 | (Sweden) Falun | 10 km C Mass Start | (Norway) Marit Bjørgen | (Norway) Therese Johaug | (Norway) Heidi Weng | (Poland) Justyna Kowalczyk | |
| | 29 | 24 March 2013 | (Sweden) Falun | 10 km F Pursuit | (Norway) Therese Johaug | (United States) Kikkan Randall | (Sweden) Charlotte Kalla | (Poland) Justyna Kowalczyk | |
| 18 | 2012–13 World Cup Final (20–24 March 2013) | | | | (Norway) Marit Bjørgen | (Norway) Therese Johaug | (Sweden) Charlotte Kalla | (Poland) Justyna Kowalczyk | |

=== Men's team ===
| WC | Date | Place | Discipline | Winner | Second | Third | Ref. |
|---|---|---|---|---|---|---|---|
| 1 | 25 November 2012 | (Sweden) Gällivare | 4 × 7.5 km relay C/F | Norway I Eldar Rønning; Martin Johnsrud Sundby; Sjur Røthe; Petter Northug | Sweden I Emil Jönsson; Johan Olsson; Daniel Rickardsson; Marcus Hellner | Russia I Evgeniy Belov; Maxim Vylegzhanin; Alexander Legkov; Ilia Chernousov | |
| 2 | 7 December 2012 | (Canada) Quebec | Team Sprint F | Kazakhstan I Denis Volotka; Nikolay Chebotko | Russia I Nikita Kryukov; Alexey Petukhov | Norway I Anders Gløersen; Eirik Brandsdal | |
| 3 | 13 January 2013 | (Czech Republic) Liberec | Team Sprint C | Russia II Mikhail Devyatyarov; Nikolay Morilov | Norway I Eirik Brandsdal; Pål Golberg | Russia I Nikita Kryukov; Alexey Petukhov | |
| 4 | 20 January 2013 | (France) La Clusaz | 4 × 7.5 km relay C/F | Norway Eldar Rønning; Didrik Tønseth; Martin Johnsrud Sundby; Sjur Røthe | Sweden Daniel Rickardsson; Johan Olsson; Calle Halfvarsson; Marcus Hellner | Czech Republic Jiří Magál; Lukáš Bauer; Aleš Razym; Martin Jakš | |
| 5 | 3 February 2013 | (Russia) Sochi | Team Sprint C | Russia I Dmitry Yaparov; Maxim Vylegzhanin | Sweden I Teodor Peterson; Emil Jönsson | Germany I Axel Teichmann; Tobias Angerer | |

=== Women's team ===
| WC | Date | Place | Discipline | Winner | Second | Third | Ref. |
|---|---|---|---|---|---|---|---|
| 1 | 25 November 2012 | (Sweden) Gällivare | 4 × 5 km relay C/F | Norway I Vibeke Skofterud; Therese Johaug; Martine Ek Hagen; Marit Bjørgen | Sweden I Ida Ingemarsdotter; Sofia Bleckur; Lisa Larsen; Charlotte Kalla | United States Holly Brooks; Kikkan Randall; Elizabeth Stephen; Jessie Diggins | |
| 2 | 7 December 2012 | (Canada) Quebec | Team Sprint F | United States I Jessie Diggins; Kikkan Randall | Germany Hanna Kolb; Denise Herrmann | Norway I Celine Brun-Lie; Maiken Caspersen Falla | |
| 3 | 13 January 2013 | (Czech Republic) Liberec | Team Sprint C | Norway I Ingvild Flugstad Østberg; Maiken Caspersen Falla | Sweden I Stina Nilsson; Ida Ingemarsdotter | Sweden II Linn Sömskar; Magdalena Pajala | |
| 4 | 20 January 2013 | (France) La Clusaz | 4 × 5 km relay C/F | Norway I Heidi Weng; Therese Johaug; Kristin Steira; Marit Bjørgen | Finland Anne Kyllönen; Aino-Kaisa Saarinen; Riitta-Liisa Roponen; Kerttu Niskanen | Norway II Vibeke Skofterud; Ingvild Flugstad Østberg; Martine Ek Hagen; Astrid Uhrenholdt Jacobsen | |
| 5 | 3 February 2013 | (Russia) Sochi | Team Sprint C | Finland Mona-Liisa Malvalehto; Anne Kyllönen | Russia II Yuliya Ivanova; Natalya Matveyeva | Canada Perianne Jones; Daria Gaiazova | |

== Men's standings ==
=== Overall ===
| Rank | Athlete | Points |
|---|---|---|
| 1 | Petter Northug (NOR) | 1561 |
| 2 | Alexander Legkov (RUS) | 1381 |
| 3 | Dario Cologna (SUI) | 1364 |
| 4 | Alexey Poltoranin (KAZ) | 995 |
| 5 | Maxim Vylegzhanin (RUS) | 935 |
| 6 | Ilia Chernousov (RUS) | 845 |
| 7 | Emil Jönsson (SWE) | 735 |
| 8 | Martin Johnsrud Sundby (NOR) | 672 |
| 9 | Marcus Hellner (SWE) | 630 |
| 10 | Finn Hågen Krogh (NOR) | 545 |

| Rank | Athlete | Points |
|---|---|---|
| 11 | Giorgio Di Centa (ITA) | 510 |
| 12 | Lukáš Bauer (CZE) | 504 |
| 13 | Sjur Røthe (NOR) | 480 |
| 14 | Tobias Angerer (GER) | 460 |
| 15 | Calle Halfvarsson (SWE) | 430 |
| 16 | Evgeniy Belov (RUS) | 425 |
| 17 | Roland Clara (ITA) | 389 |
| 18 | Johan Olsson (SWE) | 369 |
| 19 | Dmitry Yaparov (RUS) | 368 |
| 20 | Ivan Babikov (CAN) | 354 |

| Rank | Athlete | Points |
|---|---|---|
| 21 | Pål Golberg (NOR) | 346 |
| 22 | Tim Tscharnke (GER) | 338 |
| 23 | Len Väljas (CAN) | 335 |
| 24 | Daniel Rickardsson (SWE) | 328 |
| 25 | Nikita Kryukov (RUS) | 316 |
| 26 | Maurice Manificat (FRA) | 302 |
| 27 | Devon Kershaw (CAN) | 298 |
| 28 | Jens Filbrich (GER) | 295 |
| 29 | Andrew Newell (USA) | 292 |
| 30 | Alexander Bessmertnykh (RUS) | 282 |

=== Distance ===
| Rank | Athlete | Points |
|---|---|---|
| 1 | Alexander Legkov (RUS) | 793 |
| 2 | Dario Cologna (SUI) | 644 |
| 3 | Petter Northug (NOR) | 632 |
| 4 | Alexey Poltoranin (KAZ) | 521 |
| 5 | Ilia Chernousov (RUS) | 508 |
| 6 | Martin Johnsrud Sundby (NOR) | 469 |
| 7 | Maxim Vylegzhanin (RUS) | 437 |
| 8 | Sjur Røthe (NOR) | 390 |
| 9 | Tobias Angerer (GER) | 368 |
| 10 | Roland Clara (ITA) | 361 |

=== Sprint ===
| Rank | Athlete | Points |
|---|---|---|
| 1 | Emil Jönsson (SWE) | 498 |
| 2 | Petter Northug (NOR) | 329 |
| 3 | Nikita Kryukov (RUS) | 316 |
| 4 | Teodor Peterson (SWE) | 274 |
| 5 | Andrew Newell (USA) | 264 |
| 6 | Alexey Poltoranin (KAZ) | 258 |
| 7 | Eirik Brandsdal (NOR) | 240 |
| 8 | Len Väljas (CAN) | 214 |
| 9 | Dario Cologna (SUI) | 210 |
| 10 | Nikolay Chebotko (KAZ) | 183 |

== Women's standings ==
=== Overall ===
| Rank | Athlete | Points |
|---|---|---|
| 1 | Justyna Kowalczyk (POL) | 2017 |
| 2 | Therese Johaug (NOR) | 1503 |
| 3 | Kikkan Randall (USA) | 1190 |
| 4 | Marit Bjørgen (NOR) | 1148 |
| 5 | Heidi Weng (NOR) | 1085 |
| 6 | Kristin Størmer Steira (NOR) | 1018 |
| 7 | Anne Kyllönen (FIN) | 987 |
| 8 | Charlotte Kalla (SWE) | 845 |
| 9 | Astrid Uhrenholdt Jacobsen (NOR) | 778 |
| 10 | Krista Lähteenmäki (FIN) | 736 |

| Rank | Athlete | Points |
|---|---|---|
| 11 | Kerttu Niskanen (FIN) | 648 |
| 12 | Yuliya Chekalyova (RUS) | 559 |
| 13 | Denise Herrmann (GER) | 535 |
| 14 | Katrin Zeller (GER) | 499 |
| 15 | Ingvild Flugstad Østberg (NOR) | 478 |
| 16 | Aurore Jéan (FRA) | 438 |
| 17 | Masako Ishida (JPN) | 438 |
| 18 | Riitta-Liisa Roponen (FIN) | 421 |
| 19 | Maiken Caspersen Falla (NOR) | 417 |
| 20 | Elizabeth Stephen (USA) | 410 |

| Rank | Athlete | Points |
|---|---|---|
| 21 | Emma Wikén (SWE) | 359 |
| 22 | Nicole Fessel (GER) | 326 |
| 23 | Vibeke Skofterud (NOR) | 316 |
| 24 | Kateřina Smutná (AUT) | 316 |
| 25 | Celine Brun-Lie (NOR) | 309 |
| 26 | Aino-Kaisa Saarinen (FIN) | 304 |
| 27 | Riikka Sarasoja-Lilja (FIN) | 300 |
| 28 | Valentyna Shevchenko (UKR) | 290 |
| 29 | Yuliya Ivanova (RUS) | 268 |
| 30 | Mona-Liisa Malvalehto (FIN) | 244 |

=== Distance ===
| Rank | Athlete | Points |
|---|---|---|
| 1 | Justyna Kowalczyk (POL) | 1027 |
| 2 | Therese Johaug (NOR) | 874 |
| 3 | Kristin Størmer Steira (NOR) | 665 |
| 4 | Heidi Weng (NOR) | 526 |
| 5 | Anne Kyllönen (FIN) | 499 |
| 6 | Marit Bjørgen (NOR) | 492 |
| 7 | Charlotte Kalla (SWE) | 456 |
| 8 | Astrid Uhrenholdt Jacobsen (NOR) | 441 |
| 9 | Yuliya Chekalyova (RUS) | 430 |
| 10 | Kikkan Randall (USA) | 398 |

=== Sprint ===
| Rank | Athlete | Points |
|---|---|---|
| 1 | Kikkan Randall (USA) | 542 |
| 2 | Justyna Kowalczyk (POL) | 430 |
| 3 | Ingvild Flugstad Østberg (NOR) | 294 |
| 4 | Maiken Caspersen Falla (NOR) | 283 |
| 5 | Anne Kyllönen (FIN) | 260 |
| 6 | Celine Brun-Lie (NOR) | 258 |
| 7 | Marit Bjørgen (NOR) | 256 |
| 8 | Mona-Liisa Malvalehto (FIN) | 244 |
| 9 | Aurore Jéan (FRA) | 213 |
| 10 | Ida Ingemarsdotter (SWE) | 213 |

== Nations Cup ==
=== Overall ===
| Pos | Nation | Points |
|---|---|---|
| 1 | Norway | 14208 |
| 2 | Russia | 9130 |
| 3 | Sweden | 6352 |
| 4 | Finland | 4841 |
| 5 | Germany | 3869 |
| 6 | United States | 3482 |
| 7 | Italy | 2664 |
| 8 | Switzerland | 2449 |
| 9 | Poland | 2182 |
| 10 | Canada | 1947 |

=== Men ===
| Pos | Nation | Points |
|---|---|---|
| 1 | Russia | 6353 |
| 2 | Norway | 6154 |
| 3 | Sweden | 3583 |
| 4 | Switzerland | 2197 |
| 5 | Italy | 2023 |
| 6 | Germany | 1881 |
| 7 | Kazakhstan | 1645 |
| 8 | Canada | 1494 |
| 9 | Czech Republic | 909 |
| 10 | France | 895 |

=== Women ===
| Pos | Nation | Points |
|---|---|---|
| 1 | Norway | 8054 |
| 2 | Finland | 4139 |
| 3 | Russia | 2777 |
| 4 | Sweden | 2769 |
| 5 | United States | 2709 |
| 6 | Poland | 2104 |
| 7 | Germany | 1988 |
| 8 | France | 903 |
| 9 | Italy | 641 |
| 10 | Canada | 453 |

== Points distribution ==
The table shows the number of points won in the 2012–13 Cross-Country Skiing World Cup for men and women.

| Place | 1 | 2 | 3 | 4 | 5 | 6 | 7 | 8 | 9 | 10 | 11 | 12 | 13 | 14 | 15 | 16 | 17 | 18 | 19 | 20 | 21 | 22 | 23 | 24 | 25 | 26 | 27 | 28 | 29 | 30 |
| Individual | 100 | 80 | 60 | 50 | 45 | 40 | 36 | 32 | 29 | 26 | 24 | 22 | 20 | 18 | 16 | 15 | 14 | 13 | 12 | 11 | 10 | 9 | 8 | 7 | 6 | 5 | 4 | 3 | 2 | 1 |
| Team Sprint | 100 | 80 | 60 | 50 | 45 | 40 | 36 | 32 | 29 | 26 | 24 | 22 | 20 | 18 | 16 | 15 | 14 | 13 | 12 | 11 | 10 | 9 | 8 | 7 | 6 | 5 | 4 | 3 | 2 | 1 |
| Nordic Opening | 200 | 160 | 120 | 100 | 90 | 80 | 72 | 64 | 58 | 52 | 48 | 44 | 40 | 36 | 32 | 30 | 28 | 26 | 24 | 22 | 20 | 18 | 16 | 14 | 12 | 10 | 8 | 6 | 4 | 2 |
| World Cup Final | 200 | 160 | 120 | 100 | 90 | 80 | 72 | 64 | 58 | 52 | 48 | 44 | 40 | 36 | 32 | 30 | 28 | 26 | 24 | 22 | 20 | 18 | 16 | 14 | 12 | 10 | 8 | 6 | 4 | 2 |
| Relay | 200 | 160 | 120 | 100 | 90 | 80 | 72 | 64 | 58 | 52 | 48 | 44 | 40 | 36 | 32 | 30 | 28 | 26 | 24 | 22 | 20 | 18 | 16 | 14 | 12 | 10 | 8 | 6 | 4 | 2 |
| Tour de Ski | 400 | 320 | 240 | 200 | 180 | 160 | 144 | 128 | 116 | 104 | 96 | 88 | 80 | 72 | 64 | 60 | 56 | 52 | 48 | 44 | 40 | 36 | 32 | 28 | 24 | 20 | 16 | 12 | 8 | 4 |
| Stage Nordic Opening | 50 | 46 | 43 | 40 | 37 | 34 | 32 | 30 | 28 | 26 | 24 | 22 | 20 | 18 | 16 | 15 | 14 | 13 | 12 | 11 | 10 | 9 | 8 | 7 | 6 | 5 | 4 | 3 | 2 | 1 |
| Stage Tour de Ski | 50 | 46 | 43 | 40 | 37 | 34 | 32 | 30 | 28 | 26 | 24 | 22 | 20 | 18 | 16 | 15 | 14 | 13 | 12 | 11 | 10 | 9 | 8 | 7 | 6 | 5 | 4 | 3 | 2 | 1 |
| Stage World Cup Final | 50 | 46 | 43 | 40 | 37 | 34 | 32 | 30 | 28 | 26 | 24 | 22 | 20 | 18 | 16 | 15 | 14 | 13 | 12 | 11 | 10 | 9 | 8 | 7 | 6 | 5 | 4 | 3 | 2 | 1 |
| Bonus points | 15 | 12 | 10 | 8 | 6 | 5 | 4 | 3 | 2 | 1 |

Every skier's results in all distance races and sprint races counts towards the overall World Cup totals.

All distance races, included individual stages in Tour de Ski and in World Cup Final (which counts as 50% of a normal race), count towards the distance standings. All sprint races, including the sprint races during the Tour de Ski and the first race of the World Cup final (which counts as 50% of a normal race), count towards the sprint standings.

In mass start races bonus points are awarded to the first 10 at each bonus station.

The Nations Cup ranking is calculated by adding each country's individual competitors' scores and scores from team events. Relay events count double (see World Cup final positions), with only one team counting towards the total, while in team sprint events two teams contribute towards the total, with the usual World Cup points (100 to winning team, etc.) awarded.

== Achievements ==
First World Cup career victory

Men

- Tim Tscharnke (GER), 23, in his 4th season – the WC 4 (15 km C Mass Start) in Canmore; his first podium

Women

- Mona-Liisa Malvalehto (FIN), 29, in her 12th season – the WC 8 (Sprint C) in Liberec; her first podium

First World Cup podium

Men

- Sjur Røthe (NOR), 24, in his 4th season - no. 2 in the WC 4 (15 km C Mass Start) in Canmore

Women

- Anne Kyllönen (FIN), 25, in her 6th season - no. 2 in the WC 4 (10 km C Mass Start) in Canmore
- Elizabeth Stephen (USA), 23, in her 5th season - no. 2 in the WC 7 (9 km F Final Climb) in Val di Fiemme
- Nicole Fessel (GER), 30, in her 11th season - no. 3 in the WC 11 (15 km Skiathlon) in Sochi

Victories in this World Cup (all-time number of victories as of 2012/13 season in parentheses)

Men

- Petter Northug (NOR), 9 (33) first places
- Alexey Poltoranin (KAZ), 4 (6) first places
- Emil Jönsson (SWE) 3 (13) first places
- Alexander Legkov (RUS), 3 (8) first places
- Maxim Vylegzhanin (RUS), 2 (4) first places
- Finn Hågen Krogh (NOR), 2 (3) first places
- Dario Cologna (SUI), 1 (11) first place
- Eldar Rønning (NOR), 1 (11) first place
- Marcus Hellner (SWE), 1 (4) first place
- Nikita Kriukov (RUS), 1 (3) first place
- Martin Johnsrud Sundby (NOR), 1 (2) first place
- Maurice Manificat (FRA), 1 (2) first place
- Johan Olsson (SWE), 1 (5) first place
- Teodor Peterson (SWE), 1 (3) first place
- Tim Tscharnke (GER), 1 (1) first place

Women

- Justyna Kowalczyk (POL), 11 (44) first places
- Marit Bjørgen (NOR), 9 (78) first places
- Kikkan Randall (USA) 5 (10) first places
- Therese Johaug (NOR), 4 (13) first places
- Maiken Caspersen Falla (NOR), 1 (2) first place
- Mona-Liisa Malvalehto (FIN), 1 (1) first place
- Kristin Størmer Steira (NOR), 1 (3) first place
