= FIS Cross-Country Nor-Am Cup =

Series of cross-country skiing event in Canada

- Genre: Cross-country skiing
- Date: Northern wintertime season
- Begins: November
- Ends: March
- Location: Canada
- Inaugurated: 2001
- Organiser: International Ski Federation

The FIS Cross-Country Nor-Am Cup is a series of cross-country skiing events arranged by the International Ski Federation (FIS). It is one of the nine FIS Cross-Country Continental Cups, a second-level competition ranked below the Cross-Country World Cup. The Nor-Am Cup is open for competitors from all nations, but are mainly a competition for skiers from Canada.

The Nor-Am Cup has been held since the 2001 season, and has been a part of the Cross-Country Continental Cup since the 2004–05 season.

== World Cup qualification ==
In the end of certain periods, the overall leaders for both genders receive a place in the World Cup in the following period. The overall winners of the season receive a place in the World Cup in the beginning of the following season.

== Overall winners ==
=== Men ===
Season	Winner	Second	Third
2007–08	(Canada) Stefan Kuhn	(Canada) Graham Nishikawa	(Canada) Brent McMurtry
2008–09	(Canada) Graham Nishikawa (1)	(Canada) Alex Harvey	(Canada) David Nighbor
2009–10	(Canada) Brent McMurtry	(Canada) Graham Nishikawa	(Canada) Drew Goldsack
2010–11	(Canada) Graham Nishikawa (2)	(Canada) Drew Goldsack	(Canada) George Grey
2011–12	(Canada) Kevin Sandau	(Canada) Brent McMurtry	(Canada) Jesse Cockney
2012–13	(Canada) Jesse Cockney	(Canada) Graham Nishikawa	(Canada) Michael Somppi
2013–14	(Canada) Graham Nishikawa (3)	(Canada) Kevin Sandau	(Canada) Michael Somppi
2014–15	(Canada) Michael Somppi	(Canada) Kevin Sandau	(Canada) Andy Shields
2015–16	(Canada) Andy Shields (1)	(Canada) Kevin Sandau	(Canada) Knute Johnsgaard
2016–17	(Canada) Russell Kennedy	(Canada) Evan Palmer-Charrette	(Canada) Andy Shields
2017–18	(Canada) Andy Shields (2)	(Canada) Jesse Cockney	(Canada) Evan Palmer-Charrette
2018–19	(Canada) Philippe Boucher	(Canada) Alexis Dumas	(Canada) Julien Locke
2019–20	(Canada) Antoine Cyr	(Canada) Evan Palmer-Charrette	(Spain) Ricardo Izquierdo-Bernier
2020–21	Not held due to the coronavirus pandemic		
2021–22	(Canada) Antoine Cyr (2)	(Canada) Russell Kennedy	(Canada) Rémi Drolet

=== Women ===
Season	Winner	Second	Third
2007–08	(Canada) Perianne Jones (1)	(Canada) Madeleine Williams	(Canada) Daria Gaiazova
2008–09	(Canada) Madeleine Williams	(Canada) Daria Gaiazova	(United States) Laura Valaas
2009–10	(Canada) Daria Gaiazova	(Canada) Madeleine Williams	(Canada) Brooke Gosling
2010–11	(Canada) Perianne Jones (2)	(Canada) Emily Nishikawa	(Canada) Brittany Webster
2011–12	(Canada) Alysson Marshall	(Canada) Emily Nishikawa	(Canada) Kate Brennan
2013–14	(Canada) Amanda Ammar	(Canada) Kate Brennan	(Canada) Alysson Marshall
2014–15	(Canada) Emily Nishikawa	(Canada) Andrea Dupont	(Canada) Dahria Beatty
2015–16	(Canada) Dahria Beatty	(Canada) Cendrine Browne	(Canada) Olivia Bouffard-Nesbitt
2016–17	(United States) Chelsea Holmes	(Canada) Katherine Stewart-Jones	(Canada) Emily Nishikawa
2017–18	(United States) Caitlin Gregg	(Canada) Olivia Bouffard-Nesbitt	(Canada) Annika Hicks
2018–19	(Canada) Katherine Stewart-Jones	(Canada) Dahria Beatty	(Canada) Zoe Williams
2019–20	(Canada) Katherine Stewart-Jones (2)	(Canada) Cendrine Browne	(Canada) Laura Leclair
2020–21	Not held due to the coronavirus pandemic		
2021–22	(Canada) Katherine Stewart-Jones (3)	(Canada) Cendrine Browne	(Canada) Olivia Bouffard-Nesbitt
