= 2018–19 FIS Cross-Country Nor-Am Cup =

Cross-country ski competition

Discipline	Men	Women
Overall	(Canada) Philippe Boucher	(Canada) Katherine Stewart-Jones

Competition
Locations	4 venues	4 venues
Individual	11 events	11 events

The 2018–19 FIS Cross-Country Nor-Am Cup was a season of the Nor-Am Cup, a Continental Cup season in cross-country skiing for men and women. The season began on 8 December 2018 in Vernon, British Columbia, Canada and concluded on 3 February 2019 in Duntroon, Ontario, Canada.

== Calendar ==
=== Men ===
Key: C – Classic / F – Freestyle
Period	Race	Date	Place	Discipline	Winner	Second	Third	Ref.
I	1	8 December 2018	(Canada) Vernon, BC	Sprint F	(United States) Andrew Newell	(Canada) Antoine Briand	(United States) Benjamin Saxton	
I	2	9 December 2018	(Canada) Vernon, BC	15 km C	(United States) Kyle Bratrud	(United States) Benjamin Lustgarten	(Canada) Ricardo Izquierdo-Bernier	
I	3	13 December 2018	(Canada) Canmore	Sprint C	(Canada) Bob Thompson	(Canada) Angus Foster	(Canada) Julien Locke	
I	4	15 December 2018	(Canada) Canmore	15 km F	(Canada) Russell Kennedy	(Canada) Evan Palmer-Charrette	(Canada) Alexis Dumas	
I	5	16 December 2018	(Canada) Canmore	30 km C Mass Start	(Canada) Bob Thompson	(Canada) Jack Carlyle	(Canada) Russell Kennedy	
II	6	18 January 2019	(Canada) Sherbrooke	Sprint F	(Canada) Evan Palmer-Charrette	(Canada) Julien Locke	(Canada) Russell Kennedy	
II	7	19 January 2019	(Canada) Sherbrooke	15 km C	(Canada) Scott James Hill	(Canada) Russell Kennedy	(Canada) Graham Nishikawa	
II	8	20 January 2019	(Canada) Sherbrooke	30 km F Mass Start	(Canada) Russell Kennedy	(Canada) Scott James Hill	(Canada) Evan Palmer-Charrette	
III	9	1 February 2019	(Canada) Duntroon, ON	Sprint C	(Canada) Julien Locke	(Canada) Dominique Moncion-Groulx	(Canada) Antoine Briand	
III	10	2 February 2019	(Canada) Duntroon, ON	10 km C	(Canada) Alexis Dumas	(Canada) Andy Shields	(Canada) Philippe Boucher	
III	11	3 February 2019	(Canada) Duntroon, ON	15 km F Pursuit	(Canada) Alexis Dumas	(Canada) Andy Shields	(Canada) Philippe Boucher	

=== Women ===
Key: C – Classic / F – Freestyle
Period	Race	Date	Place	Discipline	Winner	Second	Third	Ref.
I	1	8 December 2018	(Canada) Vernon, BC	Sprint F	(United States) Julia Kern	(Canada) Dahria Beatty	(United States) Lauren Jortberg	
I	2	9 December 2018	(Canada) Vernon, BC	10 km C	(Canada) Katherine Stewart-Jones	(United States) Becca Rorabaugh	(United States) Julia Kern	
I	3	13 December 2018	(Canada) Canmore	Sprint C	(Canada) Dahria Beatty	(Canada) Katherine Stewart-Jones	(Canada) Maya MacIsaac-Jones	
I	4	15 December 2018	(Canada) Canmore	10 km F	(Canada) Dahria Beatty	(Canada) Katherine Stewart-Jones	(Canada) Frederique Vezina	
I	5	16 December 2018	(Canada) Canmore	15 km C Mass Start	(Canada) Dahria Beatty	(Canada) Katherine Stewart-Jones	(Canada) Hannah Mehain	
II	6	18 January 2019	(Canada) Sherbrooke	Sprint F	(Canada) Maya MacIsaac-Jones	(Canada) Katherine Stewart-Jones	(Canada) Laura Leclair	
II	7	19 January 2019	(Canada) Sherbrooke	10 km C	(Canada) Katherine Stewart-Jones	(Canada) Cendrine Browne	(Canada) Zoe Williams	
II	8	20 January 2019	(Canada) Sherbrooke	20 km F Mass Start	(Canada) Katherine Stewart-Jones	(Canada) Cendrine Browne	(Canada) Zoe Williams	
III	9	1 February 2019	(Canada) Duntroon, ON	Sprint C	(Canada) Zoe Williams	(Canada) Laura Leclair	(Canada) Mia Serratore	
III	10	2 February 2019	(Canada) Duntroon, ON	10 km C	(Canada) Zoe Williams	(Canada) Mia Serratore	(Canada) Laura Leclair	
III	11	3 February 2019	(Canada) Duntroon, ON	15 km F Pursuit	(Canada) Zoe Williams	(Canada) Mia Serratore	(Canada) Laura Leclair	

== Overall standings ==
=== Men's overall standings ===
Rank		Points
1	(Canada) Philippe Boucher	593
2	(Canada) Alexis Dumas	559
3	(Canada) Julian Locke	524
4	(Canada) Russell Kennedy	519
5	(Canada) Evan Palmer-Charrette	455
6	(Canada) Jack Carlyle	452
7	(Canada) Andy Shields	431
8	(Canada) Antoine Briand	427
9	(Canada) Dominique Moncion-Groulx	401
10	(Canada) Bob Thompson	389

=== Women's overall standings ===
Rank		Points
1	(Canada) Katherine Stewart-Jones	820
2	(Canada) Dahria Beatty	785
3	(Canada) Zoe Williams	614
4	(Canada) Laura Leclair	547
5	(Canada) Maya MacIsaac-Jones	441
6	(Canada) Annika Richardson	419
7	(Canada) Cendrine Browne	410
8	(Canada) Alannah Maclean	398
9	(Canada) Frederique Vezina	385
10	(Canada) Mia Serratore	357
