= Anna Seebacher =

Austrian cross-country skier

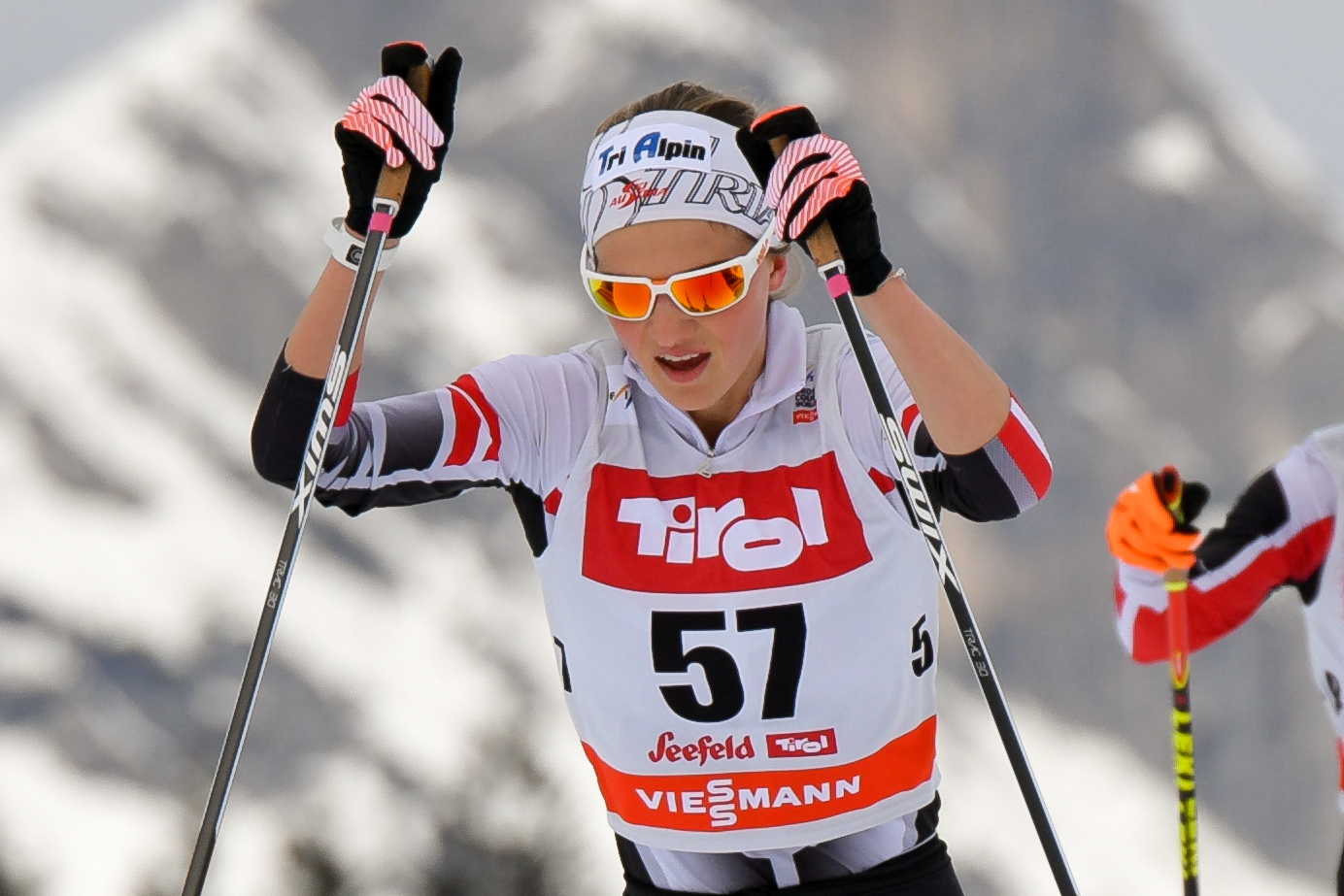
- Seebacher in 2018

Personal information
- Full name: Anna Roswitha Seebacher
- Nationality: Austria
- Born: 9 March 1994 (age 32)
- Height: 1.69 m (5 ft 7 in)

Sport
- Sport: Skiing
- Club: SC Sparkasse Radstadt-Salzburg

World Cup career
- Seasons: 2018
- Indiv. starts: 8
- Indiv. podiums: 0
- Team starts: 1
- Team podiums: 0
- Overall titles: 0
- Discipline titles: 0
- Updated on 22 January 2019

Anna Roswitha Seebacher (born 9 March 1994) is an Austrian cross-country skier. She competed in the women's 10 kilometre freestyle at the 2018 Winter Olympics.

== Cross-country skiing results ==
All results are sourced from the International Ski Federation (FIS).

=== Olympic Games ===
Year	Age	10 km individual	15 km skiathlon	30 km mass start	Sprint	4 × 5 km relay	Team sprint
2018	24	61	—	—	—	—	—

=== World Championships ===
Year	Age	10 km individual	15 km skiathlon	30 km mass start	Sprint	4 × 5 km relay	Team sprint
2017	23	49	—	—	—	—	16

=== World Cup ===
==== Season standings ====
Season	Age	Discipline standings			Ski Tour standings		
Season	Age	Overall	Distance	Sprint	Nordic Opening	Tour de Ski	World Cup Final
2018	24	NC	NC	NC	—	DNF	—
