= Anna Sixtová =

Czech cross-country skier (born 1996)

Personal information
- Nationality: Czech Republic
- Born: 29 May 1996 (age 30)

Sport
- Sport: Skiing

World Cup career
- Seasons: 3 – (2016–2017, 2019)
- Indiv. starts: 3
- Indiv. podiums: 0
- Team starts: 1
- Team podiums: 0
- Overall titles: 0
- Discipline titles: 0

Anna Sixtová (born 29 May 1996) is a Czech cross-country skier who competes internationally.

She competed for the Czech Republic at the FIS Nordic World Ski Championships 2017 in Lahti, Finland.

== Cross-country skiing results ==
All results are sourced from the International Ski Federation (FIS).

=== World Championships ===
Year	Age	10 km individual	15 km skiathlon	30 km mass start	Sprint	4 × 5 km relay	Team sprint
2017	20	—	—	45	—	—	—

=== World Cup ===
==== Season standings ====
Season	Age	Discipline standings			Ski Tour standings			
Season	Age	Overall	Distance	Sprint	Nordic Opening	Tour de Ski	World Cup Final	Ski Tour Canada
2016	19	NC	NC	—	—	—	—N/a	—
2017	20	NC	NC	—	—	—	—	—N/a
2019	22	NC	NC	—	—	—	—	—N/a
