= Cross-country skiing at the 2018 Winter Olympics – Women's 10 kilometre freestyle =

Women's 10 kilometre freestyle at the XXIII Olympic Winter Games
- Cross-country skiing
- Venue: Alpensia Cross-Country Skiing Centre
- Dates: 15 February 2018
- Competitors: 90 from 44 nations
- Winning time: 25:00.5

Medalists
1st place, gold medalist(s)		Ragnhild Haga	Norway
2nd place, silver medalist(s)		Charlotte Kalla	Sweden
3rd place, bronze medalist(s)		Marit Bjørgen	Norway
3rd place, bronze medalist(s)		Krista Pärmäkoski	Finland

The women's 10 kilometre freestyle cross-country skiing competition at the 2018 Winter Olympics was held on 15 February 2018 at 15:30 KST at the Alpensia Cross-Country Skiing Centre in Pyeongchang, South Korea. Ragnhild Haga of Norway won the gold medal, finishing more than 20 seconds ahead of silver medalist Charlotte Kalla of Sweden. Two bronze medals were awarded after Norwegian Marit Bjørgen and Krista Pärmäkoski of Finland recorded identical times; it was Bjørgen's twelfth Winter Olympic medal leaving her one behind the all-time record of thirteen held by biathlete Ole Einar Bjørndalen.

== Qualification ==
A total of up to 310 cross-country skiers qualified across all eleven events. Athletes qualified for this event by having met the A qualification standard, which meant having 100 or less FIS Points or meeting the B standard, which meant 300 or less FIS points in the distance classification. Countries not meeting the A standard were allowed to enter a maximum of one B standard athlete per gender. The Points list takes into average the best results of athletes per discipline during the qualification period (1 July 2016 to 21 January 2018). Countries received additional quotas by having athletes ranked in the top 30 of the FIS Olympics Points list (two per gender maximum, overall across all events). Countries also received an additional quota (one per gender maximum) if an athlete was ranked in the top 300 of the FIS Olympics Points list. After the distribution of B standard quotas, the remaining quotas were distributed using the Olympic FIS Points list, with each athlete only counting once for qualification purposes. A country could only enter a maximum of four athletes for the event.

== Competition schedule ==
All times are (UTC+9).

Date	Time	Event
15 February	15:30	Final

== Results ==
The race was started at 15:30.

Rank	Bib	Name	Country	Time	Deficit
1st place, gold medalist(s)	50	Ragnhild Haga	Norway	25:00.5	—
2nd place, silver medalist(s)	52	Charlotte Kalla	Sweden	25:20.8	+20.3
3rd place, bronze medalist(s)	32	Marit Bjørgen	Norway	25:32.4	+31.9
3rd place, bronze medalist(s)	48	Krista Pärmäkoski	Finland	25:32.4	+31.9
5	56	Jessie Diggins	United States	25:35.7	+35.2
6	46	Nathalie von Siebenthal	Switzerland	25:50.3	+49.8
7	58	Ingvild Flugstad Østberg	Norway	26:06.0	+1:05.5
8	42	Anastasia Sedova	Olympic Athletes from Russia	26:07.8	+1:07.3
9	54	Teresa Stadlober	Austria	26:16.1	+1:15.6
10	29	Anna Nechaevskaya	Olympic Athletes from Russia	26:24.8	+1:24.3
11	60	Heidi Weng	Norway	26:25.1	+1:24.6
12	37	Alenka Čebašek	Slovenia	26:30.1	+1:29.6
13	30	Ebba Andersson	Sweden	26:32.9	+1:32.4
14	28	Coraline Hugue	France	26:37.9	+1:37.4
15	44	Sadie Bjornsen	United States	26:42.6	+1:42.1
16	23	Kikkan Randall	United States	26:50.4	+1:49.9
17	19	Alisa Zhambalova	Olympic Athletes from Russia	26:57.8	+1:57.3
18	21	Masako Ishida	Japan	27:03.5	+2:03.0
19	18	Victoria Carl	Germany	27:04.6	+2:04.1
20	27	Riitta-Liisa Roponen	Finland	27:04.8	+2:04.3
21	16	Hanna Falk	Sweden	27:08.5	+2:08.0
22	22	Aurore Jéan	France	27:12.6	+2:12.1
23	40	Laura Mononen	Finland	27:15.6	+2:15.1
24	35	Sylwia Jaśkowiec	Poland	27:21.5	+2:21.0
25	34	Stefanie Böhler	Germany	27:21.8	+2:21.3
26	24	Sandra Ringwald	Germany	27:24.7	+2:24.2
27	15	Anamarija Lampič	Slovenia	27:26.4	+2:25.9
28	38	Petra Nováková	Czech Republic	27:33.8	+2:33.3
29	26	Elisa Brocard	Italy	27:34.8	+2:34.3
30	17	Liz Stephen	United States	27:35.9	+2:35.4
31	59	Ilaria Debertolis	Italy	27:41.2	+2:40.7
32	55	Emily Nishikawa	Canada	27:41.5	+2:41.0
33	6	Barbara Jezeršek	Australia	27:42.5	+2:42.0
34	36	Ida Ingemarsdotter	Sweden	27:42.6	+2:42.1
35	25	Anouk Faivre-Picon	France	27:42.8	+2:42.3
36	49	Li Xin	China	27:44.5	+2:44.0
37	64	Dahria Beatty	Canada	27:48.9	+2:48.4
38	13	Sara Pellegrini	Italy	28:01.5	+3:01.0
39	39	Lucia Scardoni	Italy	28:04.1	+3:03.6
40	33	Yulia Tikhonova	Belarus	28:07.0	+3:06.5
41	61	Jessica Yeaton	Australia	28:09.6	+3:09.1
42	41	Ewelina Marcisz	Poland	28:10.0	+3:09.5
43	47	Cendrine Browne	Canada	28:12.4	+3:11.9
44	65	Patrīcija Eiduka	Latvia	28:13.6	+3:13.1
45	20	Kateřina Beroušková	Czech Republic	28:14.4	+3:13.9
46	11	Maryna Antsybor	Ukraine	28:18.7	+3:18.2
47	12	Valeriya Tyuleneva	Kazakhstan	28:20.7	+3:20.2
48	9	Polina Seronosova	Belarus	28:22.8	+3:22.3
49	10	Lydia Hiernickel	Switzerland	28:33.4	+3:32.9
50	51	Tatjana Mannima	Estonia	28:37.0	+3:36.5
51	2	Lee Chae-won	South Korea	28:37.5	+3:37.0
52	7	Tetyana Antypenko	Ukraine	28:38.2	+3:37.7
53	80	Tímea Lőrincz	Romania	28:40.9	+3:40.4
54	57	Manca Slabanja	Slovenia	28:47.3	+3:46.8
55	43	Chi Chunxue	China	28:49.7	+3:49.2
56	14	Anna Shevchenko	Kazakhstan	28:56.9	+3:56.4
57	4	Delphine Claudel	France	28:58.9	+3:58.4
58	53	Alena Procházková	Slovakia	28:59.5	+3:59.0
59	5	Barbora Havlíčková	Czech Republic	29:00.7	+4:00.2
60	8	Petra Hynčicová	Czech Republic	29:09.9	+4:09.4
61	45	Anna Seebacher	Austria	29:11.2	+4:10.7
62	68	Anne-Marie Comeau	Canada	29:11.3	+4:10.8
63	3	Elena Kolomina	Kazakhstan	29:13.0	+4:12.5
64	31	Martyna Galewicz	Poland	29:23.3	+4:22.8
65	71	Tanja Karišik-Košarac	Bosnia and Herzegovina	29:24.3	+4:23.8
66	63	Antoniya Grigorova	Bulgaria	29:32.8	+4:32.3
67	1	Lisa Unterweger	Austria	29:35.2	+4:34.7
68	66	Aimee Watson	Australia	29:41.4	+4:40.9
69	74	Nika Razinger	Slovenia	29:45.5	+4:45.0
70	62	Valiantsina Kaminskaya	Belarus	30:01.6	+5:01.1
71	70	Vedrana Malec	Croatia	30:20.3	+5:19.8
72	81	Katya Galstyan	Armenia	30:25.1	+5:24.6
73	83	Marija Kaznačenko	Lithuania	30:44.2	+5:43.7
74	73	Jaqueline Mourão	Brazil	30:50.3	+5:49.8
75	76	Annika Taylor	Great Britain	30:52.9	+5:52.4
76	69	Maria Ntanou	Greece	31:04.1	+6:03.6
77	85	Emőke Szőcs	Hungary	31:04.6	+6:04.1
78	77	Elsa Guðrún Jónsdóttir	Iceland	31:12.8	+6:12.3
79	67	Ju Hye-ri	South Korea	31:27.1	+6:26.6
80	86	Inga Paškovska	Latvia	31:34.9	+6:34.4
81	75	Casey Wright	Australia	31:56.3	+6:55.8
82	78	Karen Chanloung	Thailand	32:30.2	+7:29.7
83	84	Mathilde-Amivi Petitjean	Togo	32:35.2	+7:34.7
84	82	Chinbatyn Otgontsetseg	Mongolia	32:52.1	+7:51.6
85	79	Viktorija Todorovska	Macedonia	32:57.6	+7:57.1
86	72	Ayşenur Duman	Turkey	33:06.4	+8:05.9
87	87	María Cecilia Domínguez	Argentina	34:16.1	+9:15.6
88	89	Marija Bulatović	Montenegro	35:24.0	+10:23.5
89	90	Ri Yong-gum	North Korea	36:40.4	+11:39.9
90	88	Claudia Salcedo	Chile	37:19.2	+12:18.7
