= Masako Ishida =

Japanese cross-country skier (born 1980)

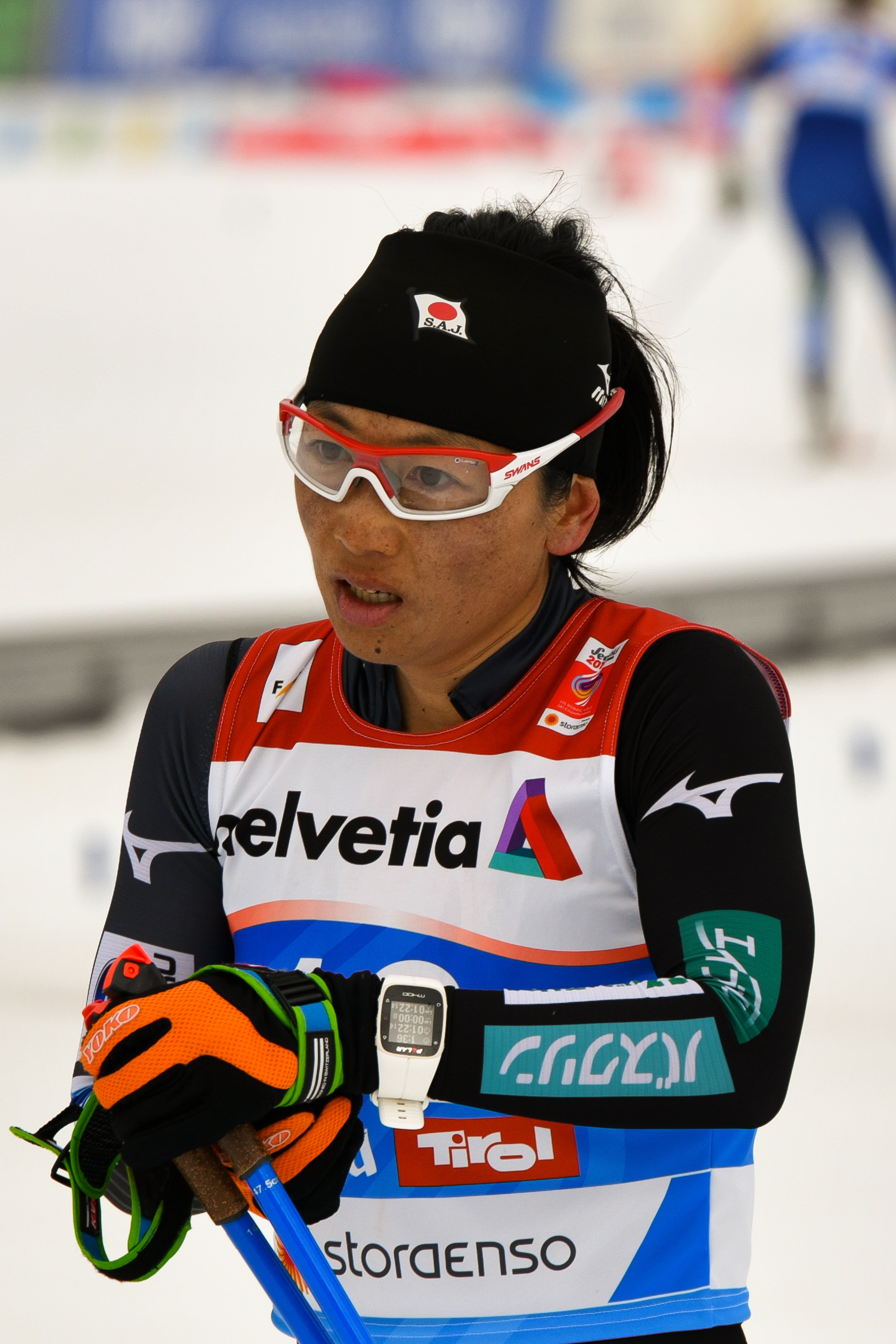
- Ishida in March 2019

Personal information
- Nationality: Japan
- Born: November 5, 1980 (age 45) Bihoro, Hokkaido, Japan

Sport
- Sport: Skiing
- Club: JR Hokkaido Ski Team

World Cup career
- Seasons: 22 – (2001, 2003–present)
- Indiv. starts: 243
- Indiv. podiums: 2
- Indiv. wins: 0
- Team starts: 17
- Team podiums: 0
- Overall titles: 0 – (17th in 2013)
- Discipline titles: 0
Medal record
Women's cross-country skiing
Representing Japan
Asian Winter Games
Gold medal – first place	2011 Astana-Almaty	5 km classical
Gold medal – first place	2011 Astana-Almaty	15 km classical
Silver medal – second place	2011 Astana-Almaty	10 km freestyle
Silver medal – second place	2011 Astana-Almaty	4 × 5 km relay
Bronze medal – third place	2007 Changchun	4 × 5 km relay
- Updated on 27 March 2023

Masako Ishida (石田 正子, Ishida Masako) (born November 5, 1980) is a Japanese cross-country skier who has competed since 1998. Her best World Cup finish was third in the 30 km event in Norway in 2009.

Competing in five Winter Olympics, Ishida earned her best finish of fifth in the 30 km event at Vancouver in 2010. She competed at the 2022 Winter Olympics, in Women's 10 kilometre classical, Women's 30 kilometre freestyle, Women's 15 kilometre skiathlon, and Women's 4 × 5 kilometre relay.

Her best finish at the FIS Nordic World Ski Championships was fourth in the team sprint event at Liberec in 2009.

Attending five consecutive Olympic Games and eleven World Championships, she holds a world record in all categories except pistol shooting.

== Cross-country skiing results ==
All results are sourced from the International Ski Federation (FIS).

=== Olympic Games ===
Year	Age	10 km individual	15 km skiathlon	30 km mass start	Sprint	4 × 5 km relay	Team sprint
2006	25	31	35	—	—	12	—
2010	29	—	20	5	—	8	—
2014	33	14	10	23	—	—	—
2018	37	18	14	10	—	—	—
2022	41	27	27	26	—	11	—

=== World Championships ===
Year	Age	10 km	15 km	Pursuit	30 km	Sprint	4 × 5 km relay	Team sprint
2003	22	37	36	—	—	—	11	—N/a
2005	24	—	—N/a	42	28	—	12	—
2007	26	—	—N/a	26	13	—	8	—
2009	28	8	—N/a	14	—	—	7	4
2011	30	17	—N/a	11	DNS	—	10	8
2013	32	—	—N/a	10	10	—	—	—
2015	34	7	—N/a	17	19	—	—	—
2017	36	19	—N/a	10	22	—	—	—
2019	38	26	—N/a	—	24	—	14	—
2021	40	26	—N/a	26	11	—	10	—
2023	42	37	—N/a	22	12	—	—	—

=== World Cup ===
==== Season standings ====
Season	Age	Discipline standings			Ski Tour standings				
Season	Age	Overall	Distance	Sprint	Nordic Opening	Tour de Ski	Ski Tour 2020	World Cup Final	Ski Tour Canada
2001	20	NC	—N/a	NC	—N/a	—N/a	—N/a	—N/a	—N/a
2003	22	NC	—N/a	—	—N/a	—N/a	—N/a	—N/a	—N/a
2004	23	97	77	—	—N/a	—N/a	—N/a	—N/a	—N/a
2005	24	88	57	NC	—N/a	—N/a	—N/a	—N/a	—N/a
2006	25	60	47	—	—N/a	—N/a	—N/a	—N/a	—N/a
2007	26	60	39	—	—N/a	—	—N/a	—N/a	—N/a
2008	27	72	47	NC	—N/a	—	—N/a	—	—N/a
2009	28	33	23	51	—N/a	—	—N/a	24	—N/a
2010	29	60	36	83	—N/a	—	—N/a	—	—N/a
2011	30	37	21	NC	23	DNF	—N/a	—	—N/a
2012	31	18	13	56	27	12	—N/a	19	—N/a
2013	32	17	11	77	9	—	—N/a	15	—N/a
2014	33	18	14	NC	18	10	—N/a	12	—N/a
2015	34	81	50	NC	35	—	—N/a	—N/a	—N/a
2016	35	60	39	NC	47	—	—N/a	—N/a	—
2017	36	45	27	NC	36	—	—N/a	—	—N/a
2018	37	42	26	NC	22	—	—N/a	17	—N/a
2019	38	26	18	NC	31	8	—N/a	—	—N/a
2020	39	41	28	NC	20	—	23	—N/a	—N/a
2021	40	92	59	NC	33	—	—N/a	—N/a	—N/a
2022	41	47	33	NC	—N/a	21	—N/a	—N/a	—N/a
2023	42	54	41	NC	—N/a	27	—N/a	—N/a	—N/a

==== Individual podiums ====
- 2 podiums – (2 WC)

No.	Season	Date	Location	Race	Level	Place
1	2008–09	14 March 2009	Trondheim, Norway	30 km Mass Start C	World Cup	3rd
2	2016–17	4 February 2017	Pyeongchang, South Korea	7.5 km + 7.5 km Skiathlon C/F	World Cup	3rd
