= Ebba Andersson (cross-country skier) =

Swedish cross-country skier (born 1997)

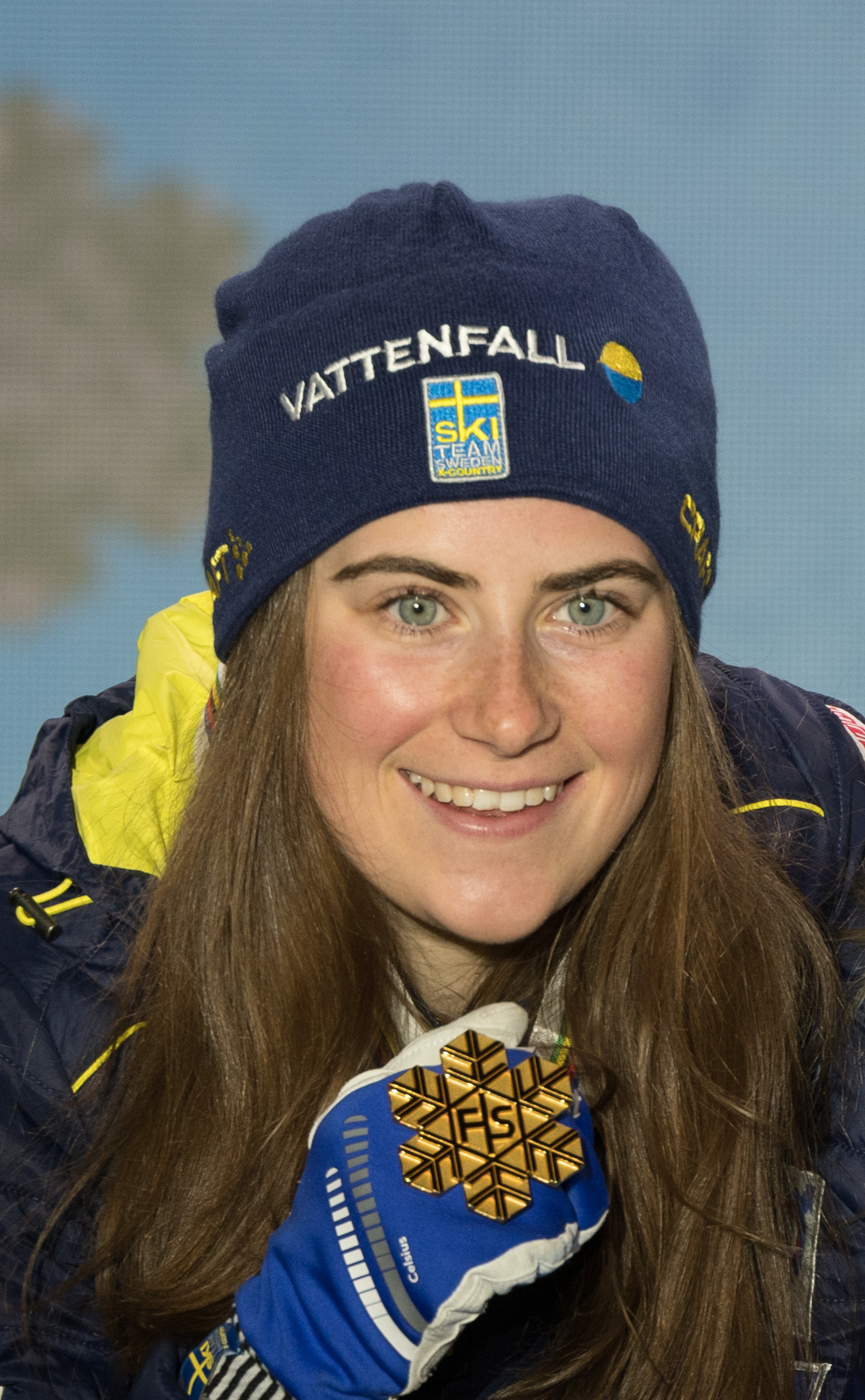
- Ebba Andersson in February 2019

Personal information
- Full name: Ebba Kristina Andersson
- Nationality: Sweden
- Born: 10 July 1997 (age 29) Hudiksvall, Sweden
- Height: 1.64 m (5 ft 5 in)

Sport
- Sport: Skiing
- Club: Piteå Elit

World Cup career
- Seasons: 8 – (2015, 2018–present)
- Indiv. starts: 121
- Indiv. podiums: 45
- Indiv. wins: 9
- Team starts: 10
- Team podiums: 7
- Team wins: 2
- Overall titles: 0 – (3rd in 2021, 2022)
- Discipline titles: 2 – (U23 in 2019, 2020)
Medal record
Women's cross-country skiing
Representing Sweden
International nordic ski competitions
| Event | 1st | 2nd | 3rd |
|---|---|---|---|
| Olympic Games | 1 | 4 | 1 |
| World Championships | 6 | 1 | 4 |
| Total | 7 | 5 | 5 |
Olympic Games
| Gold medal – first place | 2026 Milano Cortina | 50 km classical |
| Silver medal – second place | 2018 Pyeongchang | 4 × 5 km relay |
| Silver medal – second place | 2026 Milano Cortina | 10 km freestyle |
| Silver medal – second place | 2026 Milano Cortina | 20 km skiathlon |
| Silver medal – second place | 2026 Milano Cortina | 4 × 7.5 km relay |
| Bronze medal – third place | 2022 Beijing | 4 × 5 km relay |
World Championships
| Gold medal – first place | 2019 Seefeld | 4 × 5 km relay |
| Gold medal – first place | 2023 Planica | 15 km skiathlon |
| Gold medal – first place | 2023 Planica | 30 km classical |
| Gold medal – first place | 2025 Trondheim | 20 km skiathlon |
| Gold medal – first place | 2025 Trondheim | 10 km classical |
| Gold medal – first place | 2025 Trondheim | 4 x 7.5 km relay |
| Silver medal – second place | 2017 Lahti | 4 × 5 km relay |
| Bronze medal – third place | 2021 Oberstdorf | 10 km freestyle |
| Bronze medal – third place | 2021 Oberstdorf | 15 km skiathlon |
| Bronze medal – third place | 2023 Planica | 10 km freestyle |
| Bronze medal – third place | 2023 Planica | 4 × 5 km relay |
U23 World Championships
| Gold medal – first place | 2020 Oberwiesenthal | 10 km classical |
| Gold medal – first place | 2020 Oberwiesenthal | 15 km freestyle |
Junior World Championships
| Gold medal – first place | 2016 Râșnov | 10 km freestyle |
| Gold medal – first place | 2016 Râșnov | 4 × 2.5 km relay |
| Gold medal – first place | 2017 Park City | 5 km freestyle |
| Silver medal – second place | 2017 Park City | 10 km skiathlon |
| Bronze medal – third place | 2015 Almaty | 10 km skiathlon |
- Updated on 12 February 2026

Ebba Kristina Andersson (born 10 July 1997) is a Swedish cross-country skier. She has six World Championships gold medals and one Olympic gold. On 22 January 2024, she was awarded the Jerring Award for her 2023 performances.

== Personal life ==
Andersson was born in Delsbo on 10 July 1997.

She is in a relationship with Gustaf Berglund.

== Cross-country skiing ==
Andersson first international championship at a senior level was at the FIS Nordic World Ski Championships 2017 in Lahti, Finland. At these world championships she won a silver medal in the 4x5km relay, with the Swedish relay team.

In the 2018 Olympics Andersson finished fourth in the skiathlon, 0.8 seconds behind bronze medalist Krista Pärmäkoski. She placed 13th in the 10 km individual, 13th in the 30 km mass start, and won a silver medal in the relay with the Swedish team.

At the FIS Nordic World Ski Championships 2019 in Seefeld, she won her first world championships gold medal, winning the 4 × 5 km relay as a member of the Swedish team.

At the 2026 Winter Olympics, Andersson won three silver medals (in the 20 km skiathlon and 10 km freestyle individually, as well as in the 4 × 7.5 km relay as part of team Sweden) and one gold medal (in the 50 km classical).

== Running ==
Andersson has also competed in running at international junior level. During the 2015 European Junior Championships in Eskilstuna she ended up 6th at 3 000 metres with the time 9:29.98. As a track and field athlete, she competed for Sollefteå GIF Friidrott.

== Roller skiing ==
On 23 August 2019, she won a 7.5 kilometres roller skiing competition (without any shooting moments) in Sollefteå where cross-country skiers and biathletes competed against each other.

== Cross-country skiing results ==
All results are sourced from the International Ski Federation (FIS).

=== Olympic Games ===
- 6 medals – (1 gold, 4 silver, 1 bronze)

| Year | Age | 10 km individual | 15/20 km skiathlon | 30/50 km mass start | Sprint | 4 × 5/7.5 km relay | Team sprint |
|---|---|---|---|---|---|---|---|
| 2018 | 20 | 13 | 4 | 13 | — | Silver | — |
| 2022 | 24 | 6 | 10 | 8 | — | Bronze | — |
| 2026 | 28 | Silver | Silver | Gold | — | Silver | — |

=== World Championships ===
- 11 medals – (6 gold, 1 silver, 4 bronze)

| Year | Age | 10 km individual | 15/20 km skiathlon | 30/50 km mass start | Sprint | 4 × 5/7.5 km relay | Team sprint |
|---|---|---|---|---|---|---|---|
| 2017 | 19 | — | 22 | 17 | — | Silver | — |
| 2019 | 21 | 16 | — | 6 | — | Gold | — |
| 2021 | 23 | Bronze | Bronze | 4 | — | 6 | — |
| 2023 | 25 | Bronze | Gold | Gold | — | Bronze | — |
| 2025 | 27 | Gold | Gold | 4 | — | Gold | — |

=== World Cup ===
==== Season titles ====
- 2 titles – (2 U23)

Season
| Season | Discipline |
| 2019 | Under-23 |
| 2020 | Under-23 |

==== Season standings ====
| Season | Age | Discipline standings | | | | Ski Tour standings | | | |
| Season | Age | Overall | Distance | Sprint | U23 | Nordic Opening | Tour de Ski | Ski Tour 2020 | World Cup Final |
|---|---|---|---|---|---|---|---|---|---|
| 2015 | 17 | 100 | 70 | — | 21 | — | — | —N/a | —N/a |
| 2018 | 20 | 26 | 15 | NC | 3rd place, bronze medalist(s) | — | — | —N/a | 10 |
| 2019 | 21 | 7 | 5 | 45 | 1st place, gold medalist(s) | 2nd place, silver medalist(s) | — | —N/a | 5 |
| 2020 | 22 | 7 | 3rd place, bronze medalist(s) | 50 | 1st place, gold medalist(s) | — | DNF | 4 | —N/a |
| 2021 | 23 | 3rd place, bronze medalist(s) | 2nd place, silver medalist(s) | 64 | —N/a | 3rd place, bronze medalist(s) | 3rd place, bronze medalist(s) | —N/a | —N/a |
| 2022 | 24 | 3rd place, bronze medalist(s) | 4 | NC | —N/a | —N/a | 2nd place, silver medalist(s) | —N/a | —N/a |
| 2023 | 25 | 20 | 9 | 90 | —N/a | —N/a | — | —N/a | —N/a |
| 2024 | 26 | 10 | 3rd place, bronze medalist(s) | 63 | —N/a | —N/a | DNF | —N/a | —N/a |
| 2025 | 27 | 7 | 6 | 123 | —N/a | —N/a | 6 | —N/a | —N/a |

==== Individual podiums ====
- 9 victories – (8 WC, 1 WCS)
- 45 podiums – (32 WC, 13 WCS)

| No. | Season | Date | Location | Race | Level | Place |
|---|---|---|---|---|---|---|
| 1 | 2018–19 | 25 November 2018 | Rukatunturi, Finland | 10 km individual C | World Cup | 3rd |
| 2 | 2018–19 | 1 December 2018 | Lillehammer, Norway | 10 km individual F | World Cup stage | 2nd |
| 3 | 2018–19 | 2 December 2018 | Lillehammer, Norway | 10 km pursuit C | World Cup stage | 3rd |
| 4 | 2018–19 | 30 November – 2 December 2018 | (Norway) Nordic Opening | Overall standings | World Cup | 2nd |
| 5 | 2018–19 | 20 January 2019 | Otepää, Estonia | 10 km individual C | World Cup | 2nd |
| 6 | 2018–19 | 26 January 2019 | Ulricehamn, Sweden | 10 km individual F | World Cup | 3rd |
| 7 | 2018–19 | 10 March 2019 | Oslo, Norway | 30 km mass start C | World Cup | 3rd |
| 8 | 2018–19 | 17 March 2019 | Falun, Sweden | 10 km individual F | World Cup | 2nd |
| 9 | 2018–19 | 24 March 2019 | Quebec City, Canada | 10 km pursuit F | World Cup stage | 3rd |
| 10 | 2019–20 | 28 December 2019 | Lenzerheide, Switzerland | 10 km mass start F | World Cup stage | 3rd |
| 11 | 2019–20 | 31 December 2019 | Toblach, Italy | 10 km individual F | World Cup stage | 3rd |
| 12 | 2019–20 | 3 January 2020 | Val di Fiemme, Italy | 10 km mass start C | World Cup stage | 2nd |
| 13 | 2019–20 | 9 February 2020 | Falun, Sweden | 10 km mass start F | World Cup | 2nd |
| 14 | 2019–20 | 29 February 2020 | Lahti, Finland | 10 km individual C | World Cup | 2nd |
| 15 | 2019–20 | 7 March 2020 | Oslo, Norway | 30 km mass start C | World Cup | 3rd |
| 16 | 2020–21 | 28 November 2020 | Rukatunturi, Finland | 10 km individual C | World Cup stage | 3rd |
| 17 | 2020–21 | 27 November – 29 November 2020 | (Finland) Nordic Opening | Overall standings | World Cup | 3rd |
| 18 | 2020–21 | 5 January 2021 | Toblach, Italy | 10 km individual F | World Cup stage | 3rd |
| 19 | 2020–21 | 6 January 2021 | Toblach, Italy | 10 km pursuit C | World Cup stage | 2nd |
| 20 | 2020–21 | 8 January 2021 | Val di Fiemme, Italy | 10 km mass start C | World Cup stage | 3rd |
| 21 | 2020–21 | 10 January 2021 | Val di Fiemme, Italy | 10 km mass start F | World Cup stage | 1st |
| 22 | 2020–21 | 1–10 January 2021 | (Switzerland) (Italy) Tour de Ski | Overall standings | World Cup | 3rd |
| 23 | 2020–21 | 29 January 2021 | Falun, Sweden | 10 km individual F | World Cup | 3rd |
| 24 | 2020–21 | 13 March 2021 | Engadin, Switzerland | 10 km mass start C | World Cup | 3rd |
| 25 | 2020–21 | 14 March 2021 | Engadin, Switzerland | 30 km pursuit F | World Cup | 2nd |
| 26 | 2021–22 | 29 December 2021 | Lenzerheide, Switzerland | 10 km individual C | World Cup stage | 2nd |
| 27 | 2021–22 | 4 January 2022 | Val di Fiemme, Italy | 10 km mass start F | World Cup stage | 2nd |
| 28 | 2021–22 | 28 December 2021 – 4 January 2022 | (Switzerland) (Germany) (Italy) Tour de Ski | Overall standings | World Cup | 2nd |
| 29 | 2022–23 | 26 November 2022 | Rukatunturi, Finland | 10 km individual C | World Cup | 1st |
| 30 | 2022–23 | 27 November 2022 | Rukatunturi, Finland | 20 km pursuit F | World Cup | 2nd |
| 31 | 2022–23 | 4 December 2022 | Lillehammer, Norway | 20 km mass start C | World Cup | 3rd |
| 32 | 2022–23 | 27 January 2023 | Les Rousses, France | 10 km individual F | World Cup | 1st |
| 33 | 2022–23 | 29 January 2023 | Les Rousses, France | 20 km mass start C | World Cup | 1st |
| 34 | 2022–23 | 4 February 2023 | Toblach, Italy | 10 km individual F | World Cup | 1st |
| 35 | 2023–24 | 25 November 2023 | Rukatunturi, Finland | 10 km individual C | World Cup | 1st |
| 36 | 2023–24 | 2 December 2023 | Gällivare, Sweden | 10 km individual F | World Cup | 2nd |
| 37 | 2023–24 | 16 December 2023 | Trondheim, Norway | 10 km + 10 km skiathlon | World Cup | 1st |
| 38 | 2023–24 | 17 December 2023 | Trondheim, Norway | 10 km individual C | World Cup | 3rd |
| 39 | 2023–24 | 9 March 2024 | Oslo, Norway | 50 km mass start C | World Cup | 2nd |
| 40 | 2024–25 | 19 January 2025 | Les Rousses, France | 20 km mass start C | World Cup | 2nd |
| 41 | 2024–25 | 15 February 2025 | Falun, Sweden | 10 km individual C | World Cup | 1st |
| 42 | 2024–25 | 16 February 2025 | Falun, Sweden | 20 km mass start F | World Cup | 3rd |
| 43 | 2024–25 | 23 March 2025 | Lahti, Finland | 50 km mass start C | World Cup | 3rd |
| 44 | 2025–26 | December 6, 2025 | Trondheim, Norway | 10 km + 10 km Skiathlon C/F | World Cup | 3rd |
| 45 | 2025–26 | December 7, 2025 | Trondheim, Norway | 10 km Individual F | World Cup | 1st |

==== Team podiums ====
- 2 victories – (2 RL)
- 7 podiums – (7 RL)

| No. | Season | Date | Location | Race | Level | Place | Teammates |
|---|---|---|---|---|---|---|---|
| 1 | 2018–19 | 27 January 2019 | Ulricehamn, Sweden | 4 × 5 km relay C/F | World Cup | 2nd | Settlin / Kalla / Sundling |
| 2 | 2020–21 | 24 January 2021 | Lahti, Finland | 4 × 5 km relay C/F | World Cup | 2nd | Kalla / Ribom / Modig |
| 3 | 2021–22 | 5 December 2021 | Lillehammer, Norway | 4 × 5 km relay C/F | World Cup | 2nd | Ribom / Karlsson / Olsson |
| 4 | 2022–23 | 5 February 2023 | Toblach, Italy | 4 × 7.5 km relay C/F | World Cup | 2nd | Ribom / Ilar / Sundling |
| 5 | 2023–24 | 3 December 2023 | Gällivare, Sweden | 4 × 7.5 km relay C/F | World Cup | 1st | Ribom / Lundgren / Ilar |
| 6 | 2023–24 | 21 January 2024 | Oberhof, Germany | 4 × 7.5 km relay C/F | World Cup | 1st | Svahn / Karlsson / Sundling |
| 7 | 2023–24 | 26 January 2024 | Goms, Switzerland | 4 × 5 km mixed relay C/F | World Cup | 2nd | Häggström / Anger / Dahlqvist |
