= Laura Leclair =

Canadian cross-country skier (born 1997)

Laura Leclair OLY
Personal information
- Nationality: Canada
- Born: 15 January 1997 (age 29) Chelsea, Quebec, Canada

Sport
- Sport: Skiing
- Club: Chelsea Nordiq

World Cup career
- Seasons: 3 – (2017, 2019, 2021)
- Indiv. starts: 10
- Indiv. podiums: 0
- Team starts: 0
- Overall titles: 0
- Discipline titles: 0
- Updated on 20 January 2022

Laura Leclair (born 15 January 1997) is a Canadian cross-country skier.

== Career ==
=== Junior ===
At the 2020 Nordic Junior World Ski Championships in Oberwiesenthal, Germany, Leclair had a 20th-place finish in the U-23 skate ski race.

=== Senior ===
At the FIS Nordic World Ski Championships 2021, Leclair at her first senior FIS World Championships. Along with Dahria Beatty, Cendrine Browne, and Katherine Stewart-Jones, finished 9th in the 4x5km relay, Canada's best result in 20 years in the event.

At the Canadian Olympic Cross-country skiing trials in January 2022, Leclair went onto win the individual sprint event, clinching her a spot on the 2022 Olympic team.

On January 13, 2022, Leclair was officially named to Canada's 2022 Olympic team.

== Cross-country skiing results ==
All results are sourced from the International Ski Federation (FIS).

=== Olympic Games ===
Year	Age	10 km individual	15 km skiathlon	30 km mass start	Sprint	4 × 5 km relay	Team sprint
2022	25	—	—	51	58	—	—

=== World Championships ===
Year	Age	10 km individual	15 km skiathlon	30 km mass start	Sprint	4 × 5 km relay	Team sprint
2021	24	57	48	—	51	9	—

=== World Cup ===
==== Season standings ====
Season	Age	Discipline standings				Ski Tour standings		
Season	Age	Overall	Distance	Sprint	U23	Nordic Opening	Tour de Ski	World Cup Final
2017	20	NC	NC	NC	NC	—	—	67
2019	22	NC	NC	NC	NC	—	—	61
2021	24	NC	NC	NC	—N/a	—	—	—N/a
