= FIS Nordic World Ski Championships 2021 – Women's 4 × 5 kilometre relay =

Women's 4 × 5 kilometre relay at the FIS Nordic World Ski Championships 2021
- Location: Oberstdorf, Germany
- Date: 4 March
- Competitors: 60 from 15 nations
- Teams: 15
- Winning time: 53:43.2

Medalists
gold medal	Tiril Udnes Weng; Heidi Weng; Therese Johaug; Helene Marie Fossesholm	Norway
silver medal	Yana Kirpichenko; Yuliya Stupak; Tatiana Sorina; Natalya Nepryayeva
bronze medal	Jasmi Joensuu; Johanna Matintalo; Riitta-Liisa Roponen; Krista Pärmäkoski	Finland

The Women's 4 × 5 kilometre relay competition at the FIS Nordic World Ski Championships 2021 was held on 4 March 2021.

== Results ==
The race was started at 13:15.

Rank	Bib	Country	Time	Deficit
1st place, gold medalist(s)	2	Norway; Tiril Udnes Weng; Heidi Weng; Therese Johaug; Helene Marie Fossesholm	53:43.2; 14:02.3; 14:26.3; 12:16.1; 12:58.5	
2nd place, silver medalist(s)	3	Russian Ski Federation; Yana Kirpichenko; Yuliya Stupak; Tatiana Sorina; Natalya Nepryayeva	54:09.8; 14:02.9; 14:28.3; 12:33.3; 13:05.3	+26.6
3rd place, bronze medalist(s)	6	Finland; Jasmi Joensuu; Johanna Matintalo; Riitta-Liisa Roponen; Krista Pärmäkoski	54:29.4; 14:08.7; 14:52.6; 12:54.4; 12:33.7	+46.2
4	5	United States; Hailey Swirbul; Sadie Maubet Bjornsen; Rosie Brennan; Jessie Diggins	54:30.2; 14:15.9; 14:40.5; 12:59.9; 12:33.9	+47.0
5	4	Germany; Laura Gimmler; Katharina Hennig; Pia Fink; Victoria Carl	54:49.6; 14:15.2; 14:40.9; 12:56.8; 12:56.7	+1:06.4
6	1	Sweden; Jonna Sundling; Charlotte Kalla; Ebba Andersson; Frida Karlsson	55:43.2; 14:14.3; 15:53.3; 12:37.1; 12:58.5	+2:00.0
7	7	Switzerland; Laurien van der Graaff; Nadine Fähndrich; Lydia Hiernickel; Alina Meier	56:32.4; 14:16.0; 14:40.9; 13:24.4; 14:11.1	+2:49.2
8	8	Czech Republic; Kateřina Razýmová; Petra Nováková; Kateřina Janatová; Petra Hynčicová	56:47.5; 14:01.8; 15:34.1; 13:26.1; 13:45.5	+3:04.3
9	9	Canada; Katherine Stewart-Jones; Dahria Beatty; Cendrine Browne; Laura Leclair	57:25.3; 14:08.2; 15:22.6; 13:14.5; 14:40.0	+3:42.1
10	11	Japan; Masae Tsuchiya; Masako Ishida; Miki Kodama; Shiori Yokohama	59:13.2; 15:21.3; 15:35.9; 13:55.1; 14:20.9	+5:30.0
11	12	Kazakhstan; Darya Ryazhko; Irina Bykova; Valeriya Tyuleneva; Olga Mandrika	LAP; 16:10.3; 16:37.2; 13:53.1	
12	10	Poland; Monika Skinder; Izabela Marcisz; Karolina Kaleta; Karolina Kukuczka	LAP; 16:07.4; 16:13.4	
13	13	Ukraine; Yuliya Krol; Valiantsina Kaminskaya; Maryna Antsybor; Viktoriya Olekh	LAP; 15:59.4; 17:14.5	
14	14	Estonia; Kaidy Kaasiku; Aveli Uustalu; Keidy Kaasiku; Johanna Udras	LAP; 15:22.0; 18:00.0	
15	15	Lithuania; Eglė Savickaitė; Emilija Bučytė; Ieva Dainytė; Gabija Bučytė	LAP; 19:01.3	
