= FIS Nordic World Ski Championships 2021 – Women's 10 kilometre freestyle =

Event at the 2021 FIS Nordic World Ski Championship

Women's 10 kilometre freestyle at the FIS Nordic World Ski Championships 2021
- Location: Oberstdorf, Germany
- Dates: 24 February (qualification); 2 March (final)
- Competitors: 88 from 47 nations
- Winning time: 23:09.8

Medalists
gold medal	Therese Johaug	Norway
silver medal	Frida Karlsson	Sweden
bronze medal	Ebba Andersson	Sweden

The Women's 10 kilometre freestyle competition at the FIS Nordic World Ski Championships 2021 was held on 2 March. A qualification was held on 24 February 2021.

== Results ==
=== Final ===
The race was started on 2 March at 13:15.

Rank	Bib	Athlete	Country	Time	Deficit
1st place, gold medalist(s)	40	Therese Johaug	Norway	23:09.8	
2nd place, silver medalist(s)	46	Frida Karlsson	Sweden	24:04.0	+54.2
3rd place, bronze medalist(s)	34	Ebba Andersson	Sweden	24:16.7	+1:06.9
4	32	Jessie Diggins	United States	24:21.8	+1:12.0
5	44	Tatiana Sorina	Russian Ski Federation	24:23.6	+1:13.8
6	28	Charlotte Kalla	Sweden	24:26.1	+1:16.3
7	24	Ragnhild Haga	Norway	24:35.7	+1:25.9
8	50	Helene Marie Fossesholm	Norway	24:50.8	+1:41.0
9	48	Teresa Stadlober	Austria	24:52.0	+1:42.2
10	19	Riitta-Liisa Roponen	Finland	24:53.7	+1:43.9
11	29	Sadie Maubet Bjornsen	United States	24:57.6	+1:47.8
12	42	Natalya Nepryayeva	Russian Ski Federation	25:03.0	+1:53.2
13	52	Krista Pärmäkoski	Finland	25:04.2	+1:54.4
14	23	Victoria Carl	Germany	25:04.3	+1:54.5
15	56	Heidi Weng	Norway	25:07.1	+1:57.3
16	16	Francesca Franchi	Italy	25:10.4	+2:00.6
17	38	Rosie Brennan	United States	25:13.1	+2:03.3
18	30	Anamarija Lampič	Slovenia	25:16.6	+2:06.8
19	27	Tiril Udnes Weng	Norway	25:24.2	+2:14.4
20	9	Pia Fink	Germany	25:28.8	+2:19.0
21	15	Kateřina Janatová	Czech Republic	25:29.6	+2:19.8
22	58	Delphine Claudel	France	25:31.4	+2:21.6
23	53	Sophia Laukli	United States	25:32.8	+2:23.0
24	25	Laura Mononen	Finland	25:36.8	+2:27.0
25	54	Kateřina Razýmová	Czech Republic	25:38.9	+2:29.1
26	21	Masako Ishida	Japan	25:42.0	+2:32.2
27	3	Cendrine Browne	Canada	25:42.3	+2:32.5
28	39	Mariya Istomina	Russian Ski Federation	25:51.5	+2:41.7
29	36	Yuliya Stupak	Russian Ski Federation	25:51.6	+2:41.8
30	2	Masae Tsuchiya	Japan	25:57.1	+2:47.3
31	20	Anna Comarella	Italy	25:57.2	+2:47.4
32	22	Ilaria Debertolis	Italy	26:04.2	+2:54.4
33	6	Petra Hynčicová	Czech Republic	26:06.8	+2:57.0
34	60	Maja Dahlqvist	Sweden	26:08.1	+2:58.3
35	87	Baiba Bendika	Latvia	26:08.5	+2:58.7
36	14	Anna Shevchenko	Kazakhstan	26:10.7	+3:00.9
37	11	Flora Dolci	France	26:11.6	+3:01.8
38	37	Jialin Bayani	China	26:14.4	+3:04.6
39	10	Lisa Lohmann	Germany	26:17.6	+3:07.8
40	26	Anne Kyllönen	Finland	26:18.9	+3:09.1
41	45	Dinigeer Yilamujiang	China	26:21.2	+3:11.4
42	5	Miki Kodama	Japan	26:24.3	+3:14.5
43	13	Patrīcija Eiduka	Latvia	26:24.6	+3:14.8
44	31	Dahria Beatty	Canada	26:26.0	+3:16.2
45	8	Valeriya Tyuleneva	Kazakhstan	26:31.5	+3:21.7
46	7	Antonia Fräbel	Germany	26:35.3	+3:25.5
47	43	Anja Mandeljc	Slovenia	26:36.7	+3:26.9
48	18	Lucia Scardoni	Italy	26:39.1	+3:29.3
49	51	Maryna Antsybor	Ukraine	26:50.4	+3:40.6
50	59	Olga Mandrika	Kazakhstan	26:57.6	+3:47.8
51	62	Keidy Kaasiku	Estonia	27:05.6	+3:55.8
52	4	Lisa Unterweger	Austria	27:07.9	+3:58.1
53	12	Alena Procházková	Slovakia	27:14.2	+4:04.4
54	41	Carola Vila	Andorra	27:31.5	+4:21.7
55	83	Karen Chanloung	Thailand	27:32.0	+4:22.2
56	17	Izabela Marcisz	Poland	27:32.2	+4:22.4
57	72	Laura Leclair	Canada	28:01.9	+4:52.1
58	55	Angelina Shuryga	Kazakhstan	28:11.6	+5:01.8
59	57	Valentyna Kaminska	Ukraine	28:11.9	+5:02.1
60	63	Kaidy Kaasiku	Estonia	28:16.0	+5:06.2
61	1	Shiori Yokohama	Japan	28:22.9	+5:13.1
62	78	Katya Galstyan	Armenia	28:25.3	+5:15.5
63	47	Vedrana Malec	Croatia	28:32.1	+5:22.3
64	49	Barbara Walchhofer	Austria	28:37.0	+5:27.2
65	77	Karolina Kukuczka	Poland	28:40.4	+5:30.6
66	80	Tuva Bygrave	Australia	29:03.0	+5:53.2
67	65	Nina Riedener	Liechtenstein	29:03.2	+5:53.4
68	69	Han Da-som	South Korea	29:10.5	+6:00.7
69	79	Barbora Klementová	Slovakia	29:11.2	+6:01.4
70	74	Tena Hadžić	Croatia	29:14.4	+6:04.6
71	35	Yuliya Krol	Ukraine	29:21.5	+6:11.7
72	66	Lee Eui-jin	South Korea	29:48.8	+6:39.0
73	67	Viktoriya Olekh	Ukraine	29:51.7	+6:41.9
74	33	Maida Drndić	Serbia	30:05.6	+6:55.8
75	84	Jaqueline Mourão	Brazil	30:08.1	+6:58.3
76	85	Gígja Björnsdóttir	Iceland	30:15.2	+7:05.4
77	75	Kitija Auziņa	Latvia	30:20.5	+7:10.7
78	71	Ayşenur Duman	Turkey	30:22.3	+7:12.5
79	61	Tímea Lőrincz	Romania	30:44.6	+7:34.8
80	73	Maria Ntanou	Greece	31:03.4	+7:53.6
81	88	Sára Pónya	Hungary	31:18.7	+8:08.9
82	76	Seher Kaçmaz	Turkey	32:14.4	+9:04.6
83	82	María Cecilia Domínguez	Argentina	32:34.6	+9:24.8
84	70	Sanja Kusmuk	Bosnia and Herzegovina	32:35.8	+9:26.0
85	68	Paraskevi Ladopoulou	Greece	33:00.2	+9:50.4
86	86	Samanta Krampe	Latvia	33:29.5	+10:19.7
87	81	Nefeli Tita	Greece	33:46.4	+10:36.6
88	64	Anja Ilić	Serbia	34:00.0	+10:50.2

=== Qualification ===
The qualification was started on 24 February at 09:00.

Rank	Bib	Athlete	Country	Time	Deficit	Notes
1	20	Baiba Bendika	Latvia	11:48.3		Q
2	34	Karen Chanloung	Thailand	12:12.6	+24.3	Q
3	42	Katya Galstyan	Armenia	12:54.2	+1:05.9	Q
4	31	Jaqueline Mourão	Brazil	12:56.4	+1:08.1	Q
5	30	Gígja Björnsdóttir	Iceland	13:39.6	+1:51.3	Q
6	41	Nika Jagečić	Croatia	13:39.8	+1:51.5	Q
7	43	Kitija Auziņa	Latvia	13:48.5	+2:00.2	Q
8	36	María Cecilia Domínguez	Argentina	14:22.6	+2:34.3	Q
9	21	Samanta Krampe	Latvia	14:26.0	+2:37.7	Q
10	5	Sára Pónya	Hungary	14:26.5	+2:38.2	Q
11	18	Ieva Dainytė	Lithuania	14:27.9	+2:39.6	
12	39	Ioanna Kotsalou	Greece	14:28.8	+2:40.5	
13	28	Ariunsanaagiin Enkhtuul	Mongolia	14:30.6	+2:42.3	
14	15	Estere Volfa	Latvia	14:34.1	+2:45.8	
15	38	Sara Plakalović	Bosnia and Herzegovina	14:34.2	+2:45.9	
16	25	Mirlene Picin	Brazil	14:36.2	+2:47.9	
17	26	Ana Cvetanovska	North Macedonia	14:39.0	+2:50.7	
18	23	Eglė Savickaitė	Lithuania	14:50.7	+3:02.4	
19	33	Konstantina Charalampidou	Greece	15:15.4	+3:27.1	
20	37	Bruna Moura	Brazil	15:26.8	+3:38.5	
21	35	Dženana Hodžić	Serbia	15:26.9	+3:38.6	
22	29	Kalina Nedyalkova	Bulgaria	15:28.4	+3:40.1	
23	40	Samaneh Beyrami Baher	Iran	15:37.3	+3:49.0	
24	11	Marija Bulatović	Montenegro	15:41.0	+3:52.7	
25	32	Mihaela Danoska	North Macedonia	15:49.4	+4:01.1	
26	17	Barsnyamyn Nomin-Erdene	Mongolia	15:54.6	+4:06.3	
27	24	Eleni Ioannou	Greece	16:19.0	+4:30.7	
28	13	Emilija Bučytė	Lithuania	16:28.2	+4:39.9	
29	10	Bolortsetsegiin Nomunaa	Mongolia	16:51.5	+5:03.2	
30	8	Gabija Bučytė	Lithuania	17:03.5	+5:15.2	
31	22	Sahel Tir	Iran	17:08.2	+5:19.9	
32	9	Anna Mkhitaryan	Armenia	17:30.0	+5:41.7	
33	27	Farzaneh Rezasoltani	Iran	17:47.6	+5:59.3	
34	19	Zahra Saveh Shemshaki	Iran	18:39.5	+6:51.2	
35	16	Natalia Ayala	Chile	18:53.4	+7:05.1	
36	1	Fiorella D'Croz Brusatin	Colombia	18:56.6	+7:08.3	
37	12	Evgenija Zdravevska	North Macedonia	18:58.3	+7:10.0	
38	14	Andrea Marković	Serbia	19:16.7	+7:28.4	
39	7	Regina Martínez Lorenzo	Mexico	19:38.6	+7:50.3	
40	2	Angelika da Silva	Portugal	19:54.1	+8:05.8	
41	6	Nour Keirouz	Lebanon	22:07.2	+10:18.9	
42	3	Huguette Fakhry	Lebanon	24:16.9	+12:28.6	
43	4	Raquel Sukkar	Lebanon	33:40.7	+21:52.4	
