= Polina Kalsina =

Russian cross-country skier

Personal information
- Nationality: Russia
- Born: 20 March 1989 (age 37) Khanty-Mansiysk, Soviet Union

Sport
- Sport: Skiing

World Cup career
- Seasons: 8 – (2010–2014, 2016–2018)
- Indiv. starts: 96
- Indiv. podiums: 0
- Team starts: 6
- Team podiums: 0
- Overall titles: 0 – (27th in 2012)
- Discipline titles: 0
Medal record
Women's cross-country skiing
Representing Russia
U23 World Championships
Silver medal – second place	2012 Erzurum	10 km classical
- Updated on 29 May 2019

Polina Olegovna Kalsina (Russian: Поли́на Оле́говна Ка́льсина, née Medvedeva; born 20 March 1989) is a Russian cross-country skier who competes internationally with the Russian national team.

She competed at the FIS Nordic World Ski Championships 2017 in Lahti, Finland.

== Cross-country skiing results ==
All results are sourced from the International Ski Federation (FIS).

=== World Championships ===
Year	Age	10 km individual	15 km skiathlon	30 km mass start	Sprint	4 × 5 km relay	Team sprint
2017	27	24	14	—	—	5	—

=== World Cup ===
==== Season standings ====
Season	Age	Discipline standings			Ski Tour standings			
Season	Age	Overall	Distance	Sprint	Nordic Opening	Tour de Ski	World Cup Final	Ski Tour Canada
2010	21	125	—	90	—N/a	—	—	—N/a
2011	22	108	NC	77	—	—	—	—N/a
2012	23	27	23	52	14	19	23	—N/a
2013	24	50	42	61	27	25	—	—N/a
2014	25	73	51	69	29	31	—	—N/a
2016	27	38	30	NC	36	26	—N/a	23
2017	28	37	30	NC	30	20	—	—N/a
2018	29	NC	—	NC	—	—	—	—N/a
