= FIS Nordic World Ski Championships 2021 – Women's 15 kilometre skiathlon =

Women's 15 kilometre skiathlon at the FIS Nordic World Ski Championships 2021
- Location: Oberstdorf, Germany
- Date: 27 February
- Competitors: 59 from 21 nations
- Winning time: 38:35.5

Medalists
gold medal	Therese Johaug	Norway
silver medal	Frida Karlsson	Sweden
bronze medal	Ebba Andersson	Sweden

The Women's 15 kilometre skiathlon competition at the FIS Nordic World Ski Championships 2021 was held on 27 February 2021.

== Results ==
The race was started at 11:45.

Rank	Bib	Athlete	Country	Time	Deficit
1st place, gold medalist(s)	4	Therese Johaug	Norway	38:35.5	
2nd place, silver medalist(s)	8	Frida Karlsson	Sweden	39:05.5	+30.0
3rd place, bronze medalist(s)	2	Ebba Andersson	Sweden	39:05.7	+30.2
4	9	Teresa Stadlober	Austria	39:46.9	+1:11.4
5	21	Charlotte Kalla	Sweden	39:47.6	+1:12.1
6	10	Helene Marie Fossesholm	Norway	39:51.1	+1:15.6
7	15	Delphine Claudel	France	39:58.2	+1:22.7
8	7	Tatiana Sorina	Russian Ski Federation	39:58.8	+1:23.3
9	14	Heidi Weng	Norway	40:01.0	+1:25.5
10	13	Yana Kirpichenko	Russian Ski Federation	40:05.5	+1:30.0
11	3	Yuliya Stupak	Russian Ski Federation	40:28.0	+1:52.5
12	23	Anne Kjersti Kalvå	Norway	40:28.7	+1:53.2
13	11	Krista Pärmäkoski	Finland	40:28.9	+1:53.4
14	12	Kateřina Razýmová	Czech Republic	40:31.1	+1:55.6
15	1	Jessie Diggins	United States	40:35.0	+1:59.5
16	6	Natalya Nepryayeva	Russian Ski Federation	40:39.8	+2:04.3
17	26	Lotta Udnes Weng	Norway	41:03.2	+2:27.7
18	17	Emma Ribom	Sweden	41:07.1	+2:31.6
19	32	Pia Fink	Germany	41:31.7	+2:56.2
20	22	Laura Mononen	Finland	41:34.8	+2:59.3
21	19	Anna Comarella	Italy	41:44.0	+3:08.5
22	33	Vilma Nissinen	Finland	41:47.5	+3:12.0
23	38	Cendrine Browne	Canada	41:51.4	+3:15.9
24	46	Caterina Ganz	Italy	41:51.6	+3:16.1
25	44	Sophia Laukli	United States	41:54.2	+3:18.7
26	24	Masako Ishida	Japan	41:57.0	+3:21.5
27	29	Francesca Franchi	Italy	42:18.1	+3:42.6
28	25	Katherine Stewart-Jones	Canada	42:18.5	+3:43.0
29	5	Katharina Hennig	Germany	42:32.1	+3:56.6
30	18	Johanna Matintalo	Finland	42:36.6	+4:01.1
31	27	Petra Nováková	Czech Republic	42:58.4	+4:22.9
32	30	Katharine Ogden	United States	43:20.4	+4:44.9
33	34	Valeriya Tyuleneva	Kazakhstan	43:27.9	+4:52.4
34	31	Lisa Lohmann	Germany	43:28.1	+4:52.6
35	35	Martina Di Centa	Italy	43:31.4	+4:55.9
36	36	Antonia Fräbel	Germany	43:32.7	+4:57.2
37	16	Hailey Swirbul	United States	43:38.8	+5:03.3
38	20	Patrīcija Eiduka	Latvia	43:54.2	+5:18.7
39	39	Masae Tsuchiya	Japan	43:55.0	+5:19.5
40	28	Izabela Marcisz	Poland	44:01.0	+5:25.5
41	48	Carola Vila	Andorra	44:55.7	+6:20.2
42	37	Miki Kodama	Japan	45:05.4	+6:29.9
43	41	Olga Mandrika	Kazakhstan	45:17.4	+6:41.9
44	43	Angelina Shuryga	Kazakhstan	45:34.7	+6:59.2
45	40	Shiori Yokohama	Japan	45:35.4	+6:59.9
46	42	Valentyna Kaminska	Ukraine	45:35.8	+7:00.3
47	51	Karolina Kaleta	Poland	45:36.4	+7:00.9
48	54	Laura Leclair	Canada	45:39.8	+7:04.3
49	58	Tuva Bygrave	Australia	45:49.8	+7:14.3
50	47	Irina Bykova	Kazakhstan	46:17.9	+7:42.4
51	49	Yuliya Krol	Ukraine	46:22.5	+7:47.0
52	57	Katya Galstyan	Armenia	46:32.6	+7:57.1
53	56	Karolina Kukuczka	Poland	46:53.3	+8:17.8
54	45	Maryna Antsybor	Ukraine	47:03.1	+8:27.6
55	60	Jaqueline Mourão	Brazil	48:50.7	+10:15.2
56	52	Viktoriya Olekh	Ukraine	49:53.0	+11:17.5
57	55	Maria Ntanou	Greece	Lapped	
58	53	Paraskevi Ladopoulou	Greece	Lapped	
59	59	Nefeli Tita	Greece	Lapped	
	50	Anja Ilić	Serbia	Did not start	
