= FIS Nordic World Ski Championships 2017 – Women's 10 kilometre classical =

Women's 10 kilometre classical at the FIS Nordic World Ski Championships 2017
- Location: Lahti, Finland
- Date: 28 February
- Competitors: 72 from 29 nations
- Winning time: 25:24.9

Medalists
gold medal	Marit Bjørgen	Norway
silver medal	Charlotte Kalla	Sweden
bronze medal	Astrid Uhrenholdt Jacobsen	Norway

The Women's 10 kilometre classical event of the FIS Nordic World Ski Championships 2017 was held on 28 February 2017. A 5 kilometre classical qualification competition was held on 22 February 2017 for those participants that do not have enough FIS points to qualify automatically to other distances in the World Ski Championships.

== Results ==
=== Qualification ===
The qualification was held on 22 February 2017.

Rank	Bib	Athlete	Country	Time	Deficit	Notes
1	26	Elsa Guðrún Jónsdóttir	Iceland	15:23.9		Q
2	28	Nansi Okoro	Bulgaria	15:44.0	+20.1	Q
3	32	Katerina Paul	Australia	15:58.1	+34.2	Q
4	34	Chinbatyn Otgontsetseg	Mongolia	16:04.4	+40.5	Q
5	31	Gabrijela Skender	Croatia	16:18.6	+54.7	Q
6	23	Kitija Auziņa	Latvia	16:18.8	+54.9	Q
7	27	Katya Galstyan	Armenia	16:21.7	+57.8	Q
8	30	Maria Ntanou	Greece	16:47.1	+1:23.2	Q
9	35	Ariunsanaagiin Enkhtuul	Mongolia	16:47.5	+1:23.6	Q
10	25	Vanesa Emilova	Bulgaria	16:52.9	+1:29.0	Q
11	24	Hristina Miteva	Bulgaria	16:55.8	+1:31.9	
12	15	Melina Megulas	Greece	17:10.8	+1:46.9	
13	12	Ildikó Papp	Hungary	17:26.4	+2:02.5	
14	16	Bruna Moura	Brazil	17:42.2	+2:18.3	
15	17	Anna Mkhitaryan	Armenia	17:48.8	+2:24.9	
16	20	Natalija Kovalova	Latvia	17:51.4	+2:27.5	
17	33	Marija Kaznačenko	Lithuania	17:55.9	+2:32.0	
18	21	Mirlene Picin	Brazil	17:56.1	+2:32.2	
19	1	Alla Ghilenko	Moldova	17:59.3	+2:35.4	
20	5	Anastasia Niciporenko	Moldova	18:06.1	+2:42.2	
21	10	Martyna Biliūnaitė	Lithuania	18:08.5	+2:44.6	
22	19	Fern Cates	Great Britain	18:32.2	+3:08.3	
23	8	Regina Bertóti	Hungary	18:57.2	+3:33.3	
24	29	Samaneh Baher	Iran	19:25.5	+4:01.6	
25	22	Farzaneh Rezasoltani	Iran	19:43.9	+4:20.0	
26	9	Tamás Bianka	Hungary	20:01.9	+4:38.0	
27	13	Gholnaz Savojiasl	Iran	22:08.4	+6:44.5	
28	7	Erika Vasziljevic	Hungary	22:51.6	+7:27.7	
29	11	Azadeh Kiashemshaki	Iran	23:26.8	+8:02.9	
30	14	Claudia Salcedo	Chile	25:16.0	+9:52.1	
31	2	Mery Kayrouz	Lebanon	30:56.7	+15:32.8	
32	4	Laetitia Arida	Lebanon	35:25.6	+20:01.7	
—	6	Victoria Manica	Moldova	Did not start		
—	18	Marija Bulatović	Montenegro	Did not start		
—	3	Valentina Mirza	Moldova	Disqualified		

=== Final ===
The final was started at 13:45.

Rank	Bib	Athlete	Country	Time	Deficit
1st place, gold medalist(s)	54	Marit Bjørgen	Norway	25:24.9	
2nd place, silver medalist(s)	34	Charlotte Kalla	Sweden	26:05.9	+41.0
3rd place, bronze medalist(s)	30	Astrid Uhrenholdt Jacobsen	Norway	26:20.4	+55.5
4	60	Heidi Weng	Norway	26:38.7	+1:13.8
5	18	Anna Haag	Sweden	26:47.6	+1:22.7
6	38	Kerttu Niskanen	Finland	26:48.6	+1:23.7
7	56	Krista Pärmäkoski	Finland	26:56.3	+1:31.4
8	44	Justyna Kowalczyk	Poland	26:59.4	+1:34.5
8	58	Ingvild Flugstad Østberg	Norway	26:59.4	+1:34.5
10	29	Stefanie Böhler	Germany	27:00.7	+1:35.8
11	27	Anastasia Sedova	Russia	27:01.2	+1:36.3
12	50	Teresa Stadlober	Austria	27:02.5	+1:37.6
13	32	Stina Nilsson	Sweden	27:08.1	+1:43.2
14	36	Laura Mononen	Finland	27:09.6	+1:44.7
15	28	Hanna Falk	Sweden	27:16.3	+1:51.4
16	48	Nicole Fessel	Germany	27:22.0	+1:57.1
17	19	Ida Ingemarsdotter	Sweden	27:27.7	+2:02.8
18	52	Yuliya Chekalyova	Russia	27:28.4	+2:03.5
19	21	Masako Ishida	Japan	27:36.4	+2:11.5
20	13	Maryia Gushchina	Russia	27:38.3	+2:13.4
21	26	Victoria Carl	Germany	27:42.3	+2:17.4
22	5	Alena Procházková	Slovakia	27:44.1	+2:19.2
23	46	Sadie Bjornsen	United States	27:46.1	+2:21.2
24	23	Polina Kalsina	Russia	27:50.9	+2:26.0
25	20	Nadine Fähndrich	Switzerland	27:54.7	+2:29.8
26	10	Kikkan Randall	United States	27:56.6	+2:31.7
27	24	Katharina Hennig	Germany	28:10.2	+2:45.3
28	2	Kateřina Beroušková	Czech Republic	28:13.6	+2:48.7
29	25	Caterina Ganz	Italy	28:15.8	+2:50.9
30	42	Nathalie von Siebenthal	Switzerland	28:16.4	+2:51.5
31	17	Kateřina Smutná	Czech Republic	28:17.4	+2:52.5
32	7	Rosie Brennan	United States	28:20.3	+2:55.4
33	22	Lucia Scardoni	Italy	28:21.5	+2:56.6
34	6	Anamarija Lampič	Slovenia	28:26.6	+3:01.7
35	16	Yulia Tikhonova	Belarus	28:29.9	+3:05.0
36	51	Katherine Stewart-Jones	Canada	28:34.5	+3:09.6
37	14	Emily Nishikawa	Canada	28:39.8	+3:14.9
38	40	Anne Kyllönen	Finland	28:40.3	+3:15.4
39	8	Dahria Beatty	Canada	28:49.8	+3:24.9
40	49	Kornelia Kubińska	Poland	28:51.5	+3:26.6
41	12	Virginia De Martin Topranin	Italy	28:57.2	+3:32.3
42	4	Ewelina Marcisz	Poland	29:18.7	+3:53.8
43	11	Ida Sargent	United States	29:20.1	+3:55.2
44	3	Valentyna Shevchenko	Ukraine	29:26.9	+4:02.0
45	41	Anna Stoyan	Kazakhstan	29:28.9	+4:04.0
46	71	Katja Višnar	Slovenia	29:29.5	+4:04.6
47	53	Cendrine Browne	Canada	29:30.1	+4:05.2
48	45	Jessica Yeaton	Australia	29:37.8	+4:12.9
49	55	Anna Roswitha Seebacher	Austria	29:39.9	+4:15.0
50	59	Tetyana Antypenko	Ukraine	29:51.3	+4:26.4
51	57	Barbara Jezeršek	Australia	29:51.6	+4:26.7
52	9	Polina Seronosova	Belarus	29:54.4	+4:29.5
53	47	Martyna Galewicz	Poland	30:02.3	+4:37.4
54	35	Irina Bykova	Kazakhstan	30:05.9	+4:41.0
55	62	Aimee Watson	Australia	30:07.0	+4:42.1
56	39	Laura Alba	Estonia	30:09.0	+4:44.1
57	64	Annette Veerpalu	Estonia	30:26.6	+5:01.7
58	1	Annika Taylor	Great Britain	30:35.8	+5:10.9
59	43	Vesna Fabjan	Slovenia	30:45.6	+5:20.7
60	31	Lada Nesterenko	Ukraine	30:45.9	+5:21.0
61	61	Vedrana Malec	Croatia	31:02.4	+5:37.5
62	37	Valeriya Tyuleneva	Kazakhstan	31:05.2	+5:40.3
63	33	Tímea Lőrincz	Romania	31:52.6	+6:27.7
64	66	Yuliya Krol	Ukraine	32:02.5	+6:37.6
65	65	Natalya Sokolovskaya	Kazakhstan	32:05.9	+6:41.0
66	67	Anda Muižniece	Latvia	32:23.5	+6:58.6
67	70	Elsa Guðrún Jónsdóttir	Iceland	32:41.4	+7:16.5
68	63	Jaqueline Mourão	Brazil	32:43.8	+7:18.9
69	68	Nansi Okoro	Bulgaria	33:12.2	+7:47.3
70	72	Chinbatyn Otgontsetseg	Mongolia	33:53.4	+8:28.5
71	69	Katya Galstyan	Armenia	33:58.2	+8:33.3
—	15	Alenka Čebašek	Slovenia	DNF	
