= Krista Pärmäkoski =

Finnish cross-country skier (born 1990)

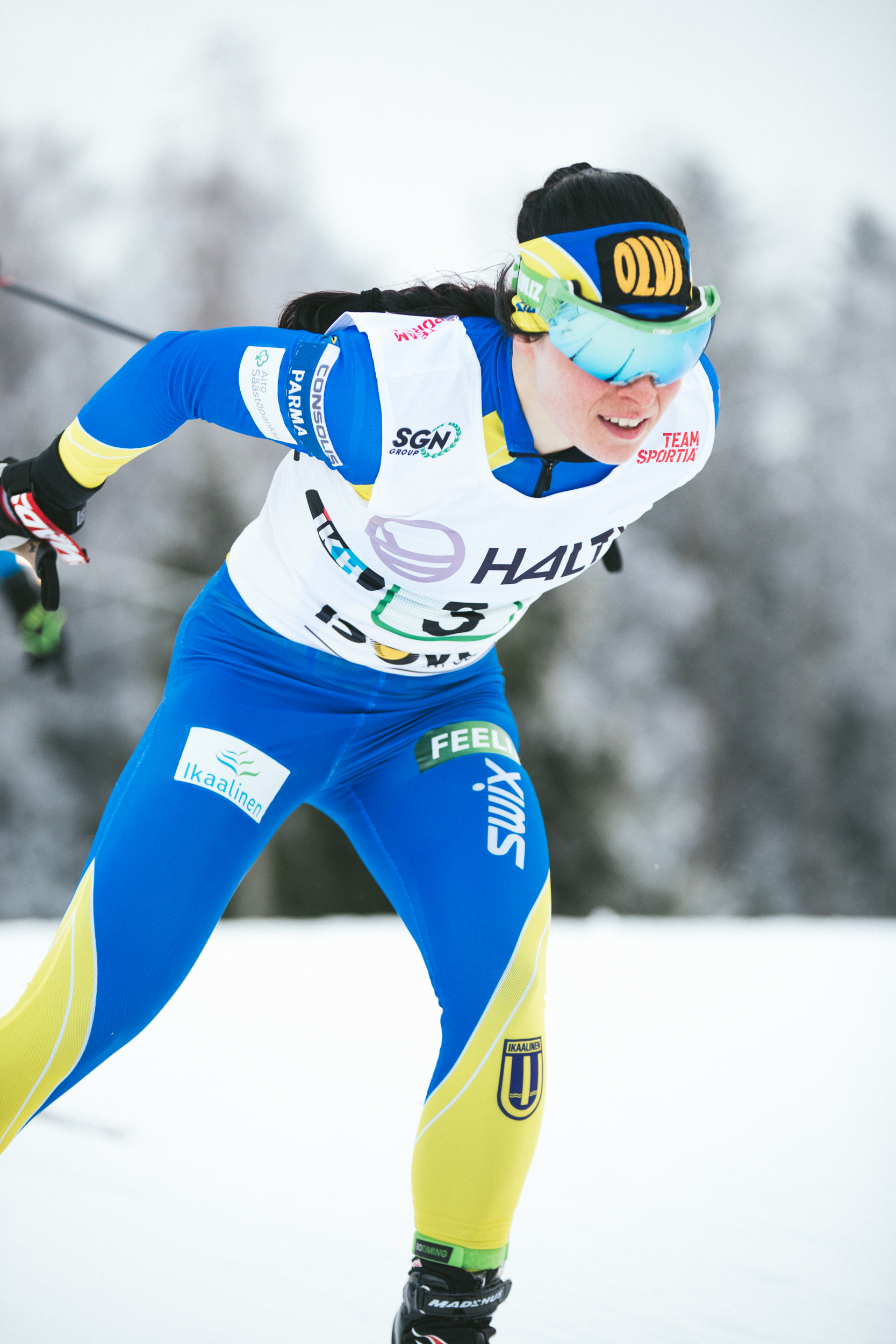
- Pärmäkoski in 2019

Personal information
- Nationality: Finland
- Born: 12 December 1990 (age 35) Ikaalinen, Finland
- Height: 1.60 m (5 ft 3 in)

Sport
- Sport: Skiing
- Club: Ikaalisten Urheilijat

World Cup career
- Seasons: 18 – (2009– 2026)
- Indiv. starts: 301
- Indiv. podiums: 37
- Indiv. wins: 6
- Team starts: 22
- Team podiums: 12
- Team wins: 0
- Overall titles: 0 – (2nd in 2017)
- Discipline titles: 0
Medal record
Women's cross-country skiing
Representing Finland
International nordic ski competitions
Event	1st	2nd	3rd
Olympic Games	0	2	3
World Championships	0	2	5
Total	0	4	8
Olympic Games
Silver medal – second place	2014 Sochi	4 × 5 km relay
Silver medal – second place	2018 Pyeongchang	30 km classical
Bronze medal – third place	2018 Pyeongchang	10 km freestyle
Bronze medal – third place	2018 Pyeongchang	15 km skiathlon
Bronze medal – third place	2022 Beijing	10 km classical
World Championships
Silver medal – second place	2011 Oslo	Team sprint
Silver medal – second place	2017 Lahti	15 km skiathlon
Bronze medal – third place	2011 Oslo	4 × 5 km relay
Bronze medal – third place	2013 Val di Fiemme	Team sprint
Bronze medal – third place	2015 Falun	4 × 5 km relay
Bronze medal – third place	2017 Lahti	4 × 5 km relay
Bronze medal – third place	2021 Oberstdorf	4 × 5 km relay
U23 World Championships
Gold medal – first place	2011 Otepää	10 km freestyle
Junior World Championships
Gold medal – first place	2010 Hinterzarten	5 km classical
Silver medal – second place	2009 Praz de Lys-Sommand	10 km skiathlon
Silver medal – second place	2010 Hinterzarten	4 × 3.33 km relay
Bronze medal – third place	2008 Mals	4 × 3.33 km relay
- Updated on 21 January 2024

Krista Pärmäkoski (née Lähteenmäki; born 12 December 1990) is a Finnish cross-country skier who has been competing since 2007. Among other career achievements, she is a five-time Olympic medalist.

== Career ==
At the 2010 Winter Olympics, Pärmäkoski finished 26th in the 30 km and 53rd in the 10 km event. At the FIS Nordic World Ski Championships 2009 in Liberec, she finished 37th in the 10 km event.

She won her first World Championship medals in Oslo 2011, a silver in the team sprint and a bronze in 4 × 5 km relay. Since then, she has amassed four other bronze medals in these events, the latest being a relay bronze in the 2021 championships in Oberstdorf.

At the 2014 Winter Olympics in Sochi, Pärmäkoski placed 10th in the 10 km classical event and won her first Olympic medal when she anchored Finland into second place in the 4 x 5 km relay.

The 2017 World Championships on home soil in Lahti, Finland, saw Pärmäkoski win her first and to date only individual WCH medal, a silver in the 15 km skiathlon behind Marit Bjørgen. The 2016–17 season was also Pärmäkoski's big breakthrough in the World Cup; she reached the podium ten times, came in second at the Tour de Ski, and placed 2nd in the overall World Cup.

The 2018 Olympics in Pyeongchang were also a remarkable success for Pärmäkoski, who won a medal in all three individual distance competitions. She won bronze both in the 15 km skiathlon and 10 km freestyle, the latter she shared with Bjørgen as their finishing times were the same. Pärmäkoski closed off the Olympics with a silver medal in the 30 km classical. Her good form from the Olympics continued for the rest of the season; among other podiums, she won the 10 km classical competitions in Lahti and Falun.

Pärmäkoski came close to another individual medal when she finished 4th in the 10 km classical in the 2019 World Championships in Seefeld, missing out on the bronze medal by only two seconds. She won her next medal at the next Olympics in Beijing in 2022, where she seized a bronze in 10 km classical after Therese Johaug and Finnish teammate Kerttu Niskanen, with only 0.1 seconds separating her from Natalia Nepryaeva of the ROC who came in fourth. As the anchor for Finland in both the team sprint and relay, Pärmäkoski finished 4th, with bare seconds from medal placements. Pärmäkoski was Finland's flag bearer in the closing ceremony.

During her career, Pärmäkoski has amassed five wins and 36 World Cup podiums overall. She has enjoyed much success at the Tour de Ski, finishing 2nd and 3rd once alongside four 4th places. In terms of individual and team Olympic and World Championship medals and World Cup success, she is one of the most successful Finnish cross-country skiers of the 21st century.

== Personal life ==
In August 2014 she married Tommi Pärmäkoski but they divorced in 2024.

== Cross-country skiing results ==
All results are sourced from the International Ski Federation (FIS).

=== Olympic Games ===
- 5 medals – (2 silver, 3 bronze)

Year	Age	10 km individual	15/20 km skiathlon	30/50 km mass start	Sprint	4 × 5/7.5 km relay	Team sprint
2010	19	52	—	25	—	—	—
2014	23	10	13	18	—	Silver	—
2018	27	Bronze	Bronze	Silver	9	4	5
2022	31	Bronze	7	10	—	4	4
2026	35	25	20	21	—	—	—

=== World Championships ===
- 7 medals – (2 silver, 5 bronze)

Year	Age	10 km individual	15 km skiathlon	30 km mass start	Sprint	4 × 5 km relay	Team sprint
2009	18	37	—	—	—	—	—
2011	20	5	31	11	16	Bronze	Silver
2013	22	15	8	DNF	14	—	Bronze
2015	24	20	23	—	—	Bronze	—
2017	26	7	Silver	6	—	Bronze	—
2019	28	4	8	11	—	6	7
2021	30	13	13	8	—	Bronze	7
2023	32	17	6	15	—	4	6

=== World Cup ===
==== Season standings ====
Season	Age	Discipline standings			Ski Tour standings				
Season	Age	Overall	Distance	Sprint	Nordic Opening	Tour de Ski	Ski Tour 2020	World Cup Final	Ski Tour Canada
2009	18	112	NC	74	—N/a	—	—N/a	—	—N/a
2010	19	102	77	—	—N/a	—	—N/a	—	—N/a
2011	20	12	12	29	12	8	—N/a	DNF	—N/a
2012	21	7	7	19	12	4	—N/a	17	—N/a
2013	22	10	13	26	6	4	—N/a	9	—N/a
2014	23	8	9	17	12	4	—N/a	11	—N/a
2015	24	24	24	40	8	DNF	—N/a	—N/a	—N/a
2016	25	4	5	9	8	8	—N/a	—N/a	4
2017	26	2nd place, silver medalist(s)	3rd place, bronze medalist(s)	6	3rd place, bronze medalist(s)	2nd place, silver medalist(s)	—N/a	5	—N/a
2018	27	4	4	7	15	4	—N/a	6	—N/a
2019	28	4	4	14	5	3rd place, bronze medalist(s)	—N/a	4	—N/a
2020	29	9	7	27	6	—	7	—N/a	—N/a
2021	30	12	13	33	DNF	5	—N/a	—N/a	—N/a
2022	31	4	3rd place, bronze medalist(s)	28	—N/a	4	—N/a	—N/a	—N/a
2023	32	11	11	25	—N/a	DNF	—N/a	—N/a	—N/a
2024	33	21	18	55	—N/a	7	—N/a	—N/a	—N/a
2025	34	11	10	60	—N/a	9	—N/a	—N/a	—N/a

==== Individual podiums ====
- 6 victories – (3 WC, 3 SWC)
- 37 podiums – (18 WC, 19 SWC)

No.	Season	Date	Location	Race	Level	Place
1	2010–11	1 January 2011	Oberhof, Germany	10 km Pursuit C	Stage World Cup	2nd
2	2012–13	4 January 2013	Toblach, Italy	3 km Individual C	Stage World Cup	2nd
3	2012–13	5 January 2013	Val di Fiemme, Italy	10 km Mass Start C	Stage World Cup	3rd
4	2015–16	20 December 2015	Toblach, Italy	10 km Individual C	World Cup	2nd
5	2015–16	11 March 2016	Canmore, Canada	10 km Individual F	Stage World Cup	3rd
6	2015–16	12 March 2016	Canmore, Canada	10 km Pursuit C	Stage World Cup	1st
7	2016–17	27 November 2016	Rukatunturi, Finland	10 km Individual C	World Cup	2nd
8	2016–17	4 December 2016	Lillehammer, Norway	10 km Pursuit C	Stage World Cup	1st
9	2016–17	2–4 December 2016	(Norway) Nordic Opening	Overall Standings	World Cup	3rd
10	2016–17	10 December 2016	Davos, Switzerland	15 km Individual F	World Cup	3rd
11	2016–17	1 January 2017	Val Müstair, Switzerland	5 km Mass Start C	Stage World Cup	3rd
12	2016–17	6 January 2017	Toblach, Italy	5 km Individual F	Stage World Cup	2nd
13	2016–17	31 December 2016 – 8 January 2017	(Switzerland) (Germany) (Italy) Tour de Ski	Overall Standings	World Cup	2nd
14	2016–17	21 January 2017	Ulricehamn, Sweden	10 km Individual F	World Cup	2nd
15	2016–17	8 March 2017	Drammen, Norway	1.2 km Sprint C	World Cup	2nd
16	2016–17	12 March 2017	Oslo, Norway	30 km Mass Start C	World Cup	2nd
17	2016–17	18 March 2017	Quebec, Canada	10 km Mass Start C	Stage World Cup	3rd
18	2017–18	2 December 2016	Lillehammer, Norway	1.3 km Sprint C	World Cup	2nd
19	2017–18	10 December 2017	Davos, Switzerland	10 km Individual F	World Cup	3rd
20	2017–18	4 January 2018	Oberstdorf, Germany	10 km Mass Start F	Stage World Cup	3rd
21	2017–18	6 January 2018	Val di Fiemme, Italy	10 km Mass Start C	Stage World Cup	2nd
22	2017–18	21 January 2018	Planica, Slovenia	10 km Individual C	World Cup	1st
23	2017–18	4 March 2018	Lahti, Finland	10 km Individual C	World Cup	1st
24	2017–18	17 March 2018	Falun, Sweden	10 km Mass Start C	Stage World Cup	1st
25	2018–19	16 December 2018	Davos, Switzerland	10 km Individual F	World Cup	3rd
26	2018–19	6 January 2019	Val di Fiemme, Italy	9 km Pursuit F	Stage World Cup	2nd
27	2018–19	29 December 2018 – 6 January 2019	(Italy) (Switzerland) (Germany) Tour de Ski	Overall Standings	World Cup	3rd
28	2018–19	24 March 2019	Quebec City, Canada	10 km Pursuit F	Stage World Cup	2nd
29	2019–20	30 November 2019	Rukatunturi, Finland	10 km Individual C	Stage World Cup	2nd
30	2019–20	23 February 2020	Trondheim, Norway	15 km Pursuit C	Stage World Cup	3rd
31	2019–20	29 February 2020	Lahti, Finland	10 km Individual C	World Cup	3rd
32	2021–22	3 January 2022	Val di Fiemme, Italy	10 km Mass Start C	Stage World Cup	3rd
33	2021–22	27 February 2022	Lahti, Finland	10 km Individual C	World Cup	3rd
34	2021–22	5 March 2022	Oslo, Norway	30 km Mass Start C	World Cup	2nd
35	2022–23	3 January 2023	Oberstdorf, Germany	10 km Individual C	Stage World Cup	2nd
36	2022–23	4 January 2023	Oberstdorf, Germany	20 km Pursuit F	Stage World Cup	2nd
37	2023–24	2 March 2024	Lahti, Finland	20 km Individual C	World Cup	1st

==== Team podiums ====
- 12 podiums – (11 RL, 1 TS)

No.	Season	Date	Location	Race	Level	Place	Teammates
1	2011–12	20 November 2011	Sjusjøen, Norway	4 × 5 km Relay C/F	World Cup	3rd	Saarinen / Roponen / Sarasoja-Lilja
2	2011–12	12 February 2012	Nové Město, Czech Republic	4 × 5 km Relay C/F	World Cup	2nd	Sarasoja-Lilja / Saarinen / Roponen
3	2013–14	8 December 2013	Lillehammer, Norway	4 × 5 km Relay C/F	World Cup	2nd	Saarinen / Kyllönen / Niskanen
4	2015–16	6 December 2015	Lillehammer, Norway	4 × 5 km Relay C/F	World Cup	2nd	Niskanen / Mononen / Kyllönen
5	2015–16	24 January 2016	Nové Město, Czech Republic	4 × 5 km Relay C/F	World Cup	3rd	Kyllönen / Roponen / Niskanen
6	2018–19	9 December 2018	Beitostølen, Norway	4 × 5 km Relay C/F	World Cup	3rd	Matintalo / Roponen / Piippo
7	2018–19	27 January 2019	Ulricehamn, Sweden	4 × 5 km Relay C/F	World Cup	3rd	Mononen / Roponen / Piippo
8	2019–20	1 March 2020	Lahti, Finland	4 × 5 km Relay C/F	World Cup	2nd	Matintalo / Niskanen / Mononen
9	2020–21	24 January 2021	Lahti, Finland	4 × 5 km Relay C/F	World Cup	3rd	Matintalo / Niskanen / Mononen
10	2021–22	13 March 2022	Falun, Sweden	4 × 5 km Mixed Relay F	World Cup	2nd	K. Niskanen / Hyvärinen / I. Niskanen
11	2023–24	21 January 2024	Oberhof, Germany	4 × 7.5 km Relay C/F	World Cup	3rd	Matintalo / Kyllönen / Joensuu
12	2023–24	1 March 2024	Lahti, Finland	6 × 1.3 km Team Sprint C	World Cup	2nd	Matintalo
