= Elsa Guðrún Jónsdóttir =

Icelandic cross-country skier (born 1986)

Personal information
- Nationality: Icelandic
- Born: 29 March 1986 (age 38)

Sport
- Sport: Cross-country skiing

Elsa Guðrún Jónsdóttir (born 29 March 1986) is an Icelandic cross-country skier. She competed in the women's 10 kilometre freestyle at the 2018 Winter Olympics.
