= Brent McMurtry =

Canadian cross-country skier

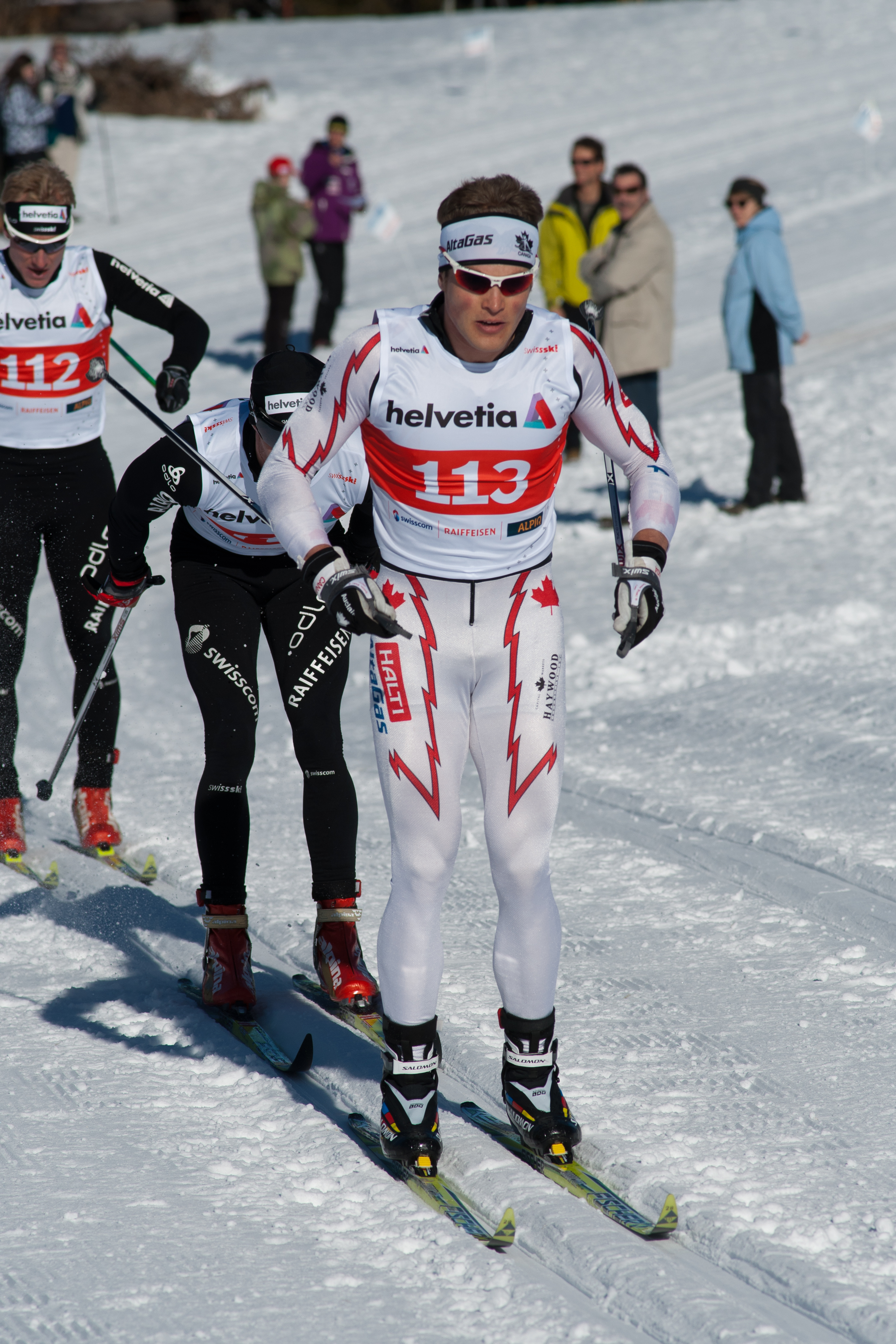

Personal information
- Born: 22 April 1986 (age 40) Calgary, Alberta, Canada
- Height: 175 cm (69 in)
- Weight: 75 kg (165 lb)

Sport
- Sport: Skiing
- Updated on 19 February 2010

Brent McMurtry (born 22 April 1986 in Calgary, Alberta) is a Canadian cross-country skier who has been competing since 2003. He was a member of the Canadian National Cross country ski team.

He competed at the 2010 Winter Olympics in Vancouver in the men's individual sprint classic competition on 17 February where he finished 41st in the qualifying round with a 3:45.02 time (10.45 behind the leader).

McMurtry's best World Cup finish was ninth in the team sprint event at Canada in 2009 while his best individual finish was 16th in a 15 km + 15 km double pursuit event also at that same event.

Brent was voted as the best looking male athlete at the 2010 Vancouver Winter Olympics.

Brent scored the first goal in Urban Expos history in a 2–1 loss to Twaffle FC on 8 October 2019 at Empire Field in Vancouver, BC.
