= Dahria Beatty =

Canadian cross-country skier

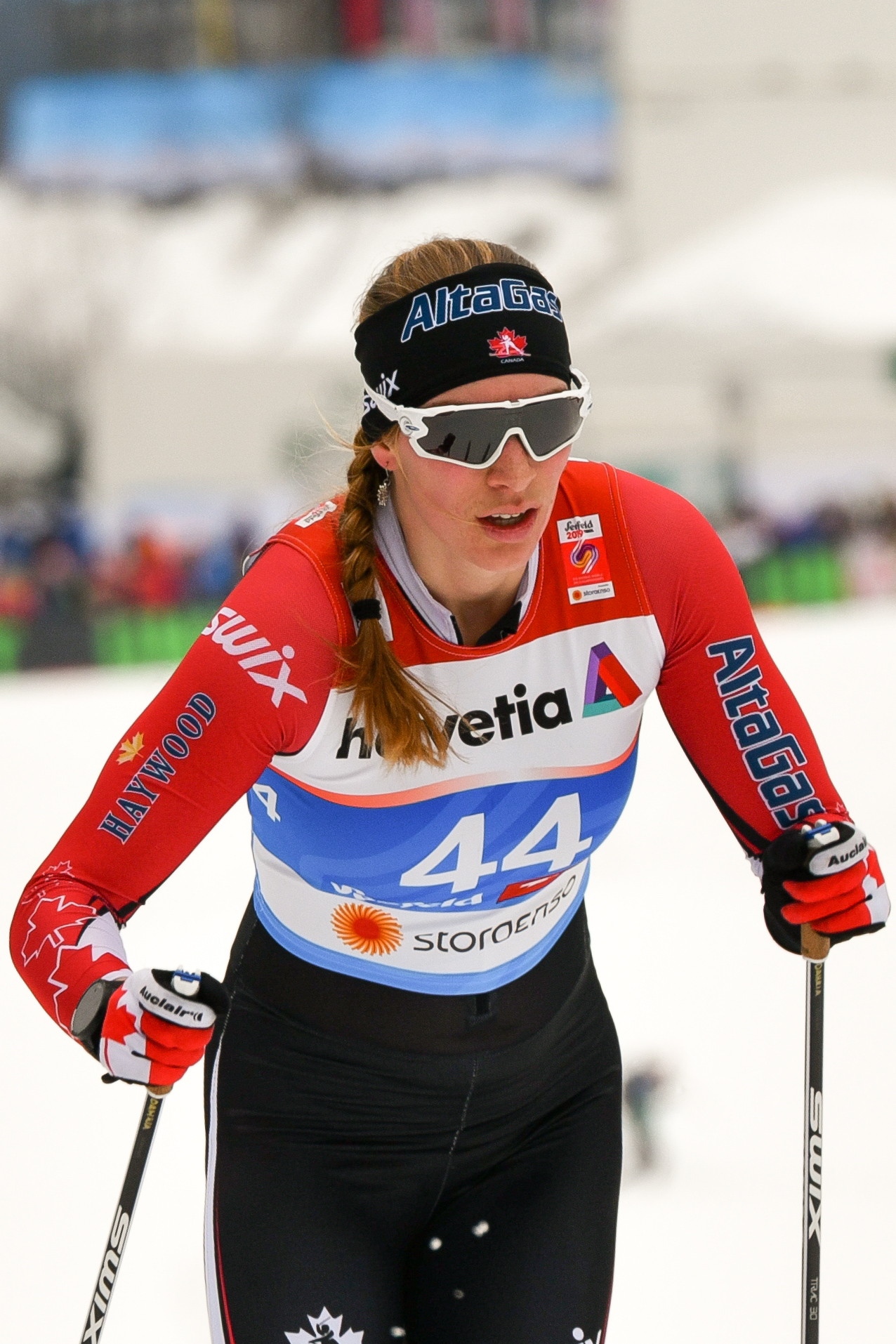
- Beatty in Seefeld, 2019

Personal information
- Nationality: Canada
- Born: 7 March 1994 (age 32) Whitehorse, Yukon, Canada

Sport
- Sport: Skiing
- Club: Whitehorse Cross Country SC

World Cup career
- Seasons: 10 – (2013, 2015–2023)
- Indiv. starts: 95
- Indiv. podiums: 0
- Team starts: 11
- Team podiums: 0
- Overall titles: 0 – (69th in 2021)
- Discipline titles: 0

Dahria Beatty (born 7 March 1994) is a Canadian, former cross-country skier who competed internationally.

== Career ==
She competed for Canada at the FIS Nordic World Ski Championships 2017 in Lahti, Finland, at the 2018 Winter Olympics, and at the 2019 World Championships.

On 13 January 2022, Beatty was officially named to Canada's 2022 Olympic team.

She announced her retirement from cross-country skiing on 14 March 2023.

== Cross-country skiing results ==
All results are sourced from the International Ski Federation (FIS).

=== Olympic Games ===
Year	Age	10 km individual	15 km skiathlon	30 km mass start	Sprint	4 × 5 km relay	Team sprint
2018	24	37	52	—	42	13	13
2022	28	18	28	39	25	9	12

=== World Championships ===
Year	Age	10 km individual	15 km skiathlon	30 km mass start	Sprint	4 × 5 km relay	Team sprint
2017	23	39	—	34	37	10	13
2019	25	49	—	41	31	12	12
2021	27	44	—	34	38	9	12
2023	29	46	—	36	35	—	12

=== World Cup ===
==== Season standings ====
Season	Age	Discipline standings				Ski Tour standings				
Season	Age	Overall	Distance	Sprint	U23	Nordic Opening	Tour de Ski	Ski Tour 2020	World Cup Final	Ski Tour Canada
2013	18	NC	NC	NC	—N/a	—	—	—N/a	—	—N/a
2015	20	NC	—	NC	NC	—	—	—N/a	—N/a	—N/a
2016	21	80	NC	52	18	—	—	—N/a	—N/a	DNF
2017	22	99	83	71	17	59	—	—N/a	50	—N/a
2018	23	89	NC	61	—N/a	DNF	—	—N/a	54	—N/a
2019	24	84	NC	45	—N/a	—	DNF	—N/a	45	—N/a
2020	25	79	NC	51	—N/a	—	—	—	—N/a	—N/a
2021	26	69	43	NC	—N/a	—	—	—N/a	—N/a	—N/a
2022	27	NC	NC	NC	—N/a	—N/a	—	—N/a	—N/a	—N/a
2023	28	74	69	62	—N/a	—N/a	37	—N/a	—N/a	—N/a
