= Russell Kennedy =

Canadian cross-country skier (born 1991)

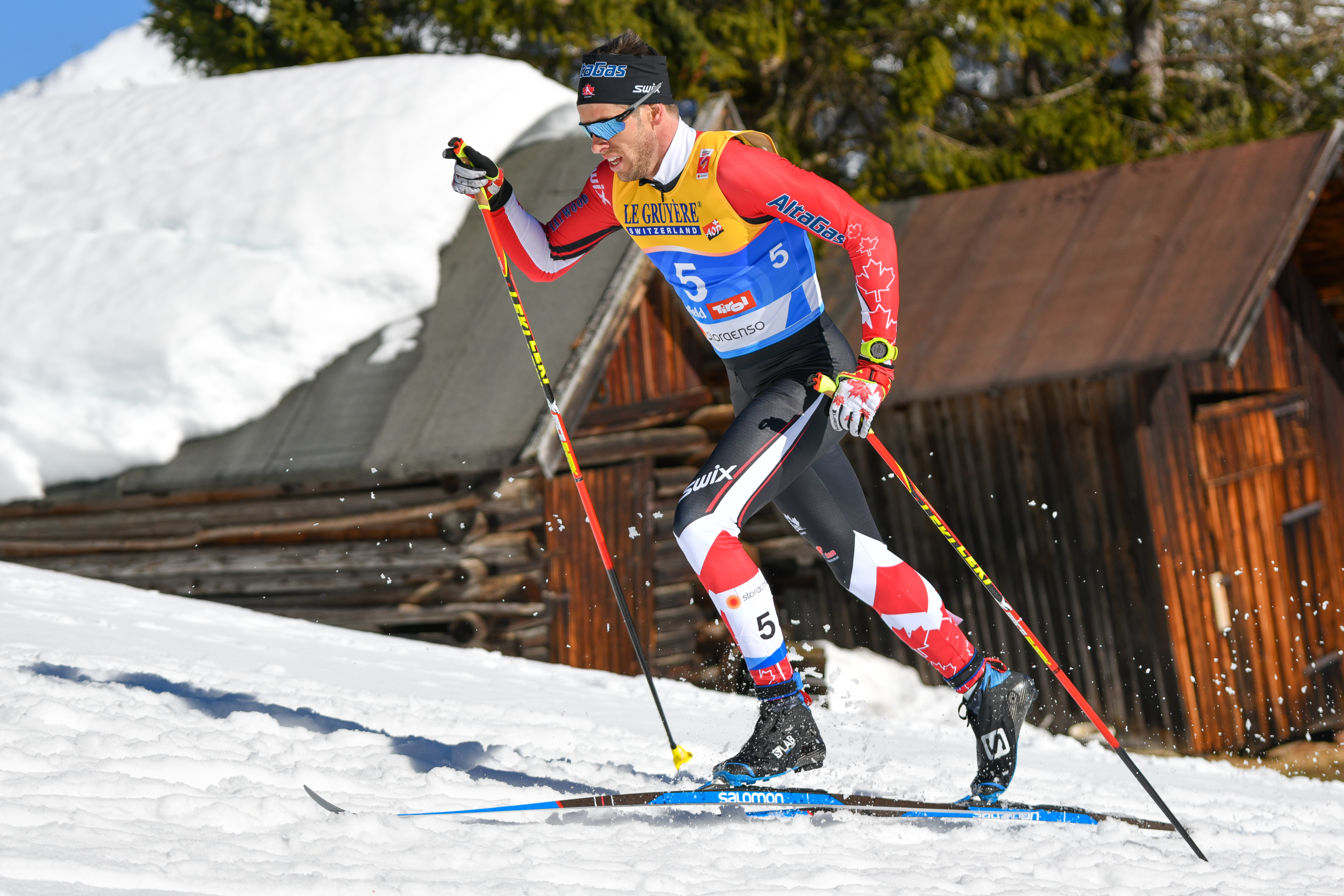
- Russell Kennedy in 2019

Personal information
- Nationality: Canada
- Born: 7 October 1991 (age 34) Truckee, California, United States

Sport
- Sport: Skiing
- Club: Canmore Nordic Ski Club

World Cup career
- Seasons: 9 – (2013, 2016–present)
- Indiv. starts: 66
- Indiv. podiums: 0
- Team starts: 6
- Team podiums: 0
- Overall titles: 0 – (102nd in 2022)
- Discipline titles: 0
- Updated on 29 March 2023

Russell Kennedy (born 7 October 1991) is a Canadian cross-country skier. He competed in the 2018 Winter Olympics.

Kennedy is a graduate of Alberta's Athabasca University.

== Cross-country skiing results ==
All results are sourced from the International Ski Federation (FIS).

=== Olympic Games ===
| Year | Age | 15 km individual | 30 km skiathlon | 50 km mass start | Sprint | 4 × 10 km relay | Team sprint |
|---|---|---|---|---|---|---|---|
| 2018 | 26 | — | — | 49 | 55 | 9 | — |

=== World Championships ===
| Year | Age | 15 km individual | 30 km skiathlon | 50 km mass start | Sprint | 4 × 10 km relay | Team sprint |
|---|---|---|---|---|---|---|---|
| 2019 | 27 | 68 | — | 46 | DNS | — | — |
| 2021 | 29 | 30 | DNF | 28 | DNS | 10 | — |
| 2023 | 31 | — | 37 | — | — | — | — |

=== World Cup ===
==== Season standings ====
| Season | Age | Discipline standings | | | Ski Tour standings | | | | |
| Season | Age | Overall | Distance | Sprint | Nordic Opening | Tour de Ski | Ski Tour 2020 | World Cup Final | Ski Tour Canada |
|---|---|---|---|---|---|---|---|---|---|
| 2013 | 21 | NC | — | NC | — | — | —N/a | — | —N/a |
| 2016 | 24 | NC | NC | NC | — | — | —N/a | —N/a | 50 |
| 2017 | 25 | NC | NC | NC | — | — | —N/a | 67 | —N/a |
| 2018 | 26 | NC | NC | NC | — | — | —N/a | — | —N/a |
| 2019 | 27 | 106 | NC | 54 | 61 | — | —N/a | 56 | —N/a |
| 2020 | 28 | NC | NC | NC | — | — | 39 | —N/a | —N/a |
| 2021 | 29 | 111 | 71 | NC | — | — | —N/a | —N/a | —N/a |
| 2022 | 30 | 102 | 55 | NC | —N/a | — | —N/a | —N/a | —N/a |
| 2023 | 31 | 126 | 89 | 112 | —N/a | 39 | —N/a | —N/a | —N/a |
