= FIS Nordic World Ski Championships 2017 – Women's 30 kilometre freestyle =

Women's 30 kilometre freestyle at the FIS Nordic World Ski Championships 2017
- Location: Lahti, Finland
- Date: 4 March
- Competitors: 51 from 22 nations
- Winning time: 1:08:36.8

Medalists
gold medal	Marit Bjørgen	Norway
silver medal	Heidi Weng	Norway
bronze medal	Astrid Uhrenholdt Jacobsen	Norway

The Women's 30 kilometre freestyle event of the FIS Nordic World Ski Championships 2017 was held on 4 March 2017.

== Results ==
The race was started at 14:30.

Rank	Bib	Athlete	Country	Time	Deficit
1st place, gold medalist(s)	3	Marit Bjørgen	Norway	1:08:36.8	
2nd place, silver medalist(s)	1	Heidi Weng	Norway	1:08:38.7	+1.9
3rd place, bronze medalist(s)	14	Astrid Uhrenholdt Jacobsen	Norway	1:08:38.7	+1.9
4	12	Ragnhild Haga	Norway	1:08:44.2	+7.4
5	4	Jessie Diggins	United States	1:08:47.2	+10.4
6	2	Krista Pärmäkoski	Finland	1:08:48.1	+11.3
7	5	Charlotte Kalla	Sweden	1:08:50.7	+13.9
8	8	Teresa Stadlober	Austria	1:08:52.3	+15.5
9	16	Anna Haag	Sweden	1:08:57.1	+20.3
10	6	Yuliya Chekalyova	Russia	1:09:57.7	+1:20.9
11	10	Nathalie von Siebenthal	Switzerland	1:09:57.7	+1:20.9
12	15	Stefanie Böhler	Germany	1:10:00.3	+1:23.5
13	24	Chelsea Holmes	United States	1:10:04.9	+1:28.1
14	18	Aino-Kaisa Saarinen	Finland	1:10:33.1	+1:56.3
15	28	Elisa Brocard	Italy	1:10:33.2	+1:56.4
16	17	Ilaria Debertolis	Italy	1:10:33.2	+1:56.4
17	20	Ebba Andersson	Sweden	1:10:35.9	+1:59.1
18	7	Laura Mononen	Finland	1:10:37.5	+2:00.7
19	23	Katharina Hennig	Germany	1:11:16.9	+2:40.1
20	26	Yelena Soboleva	Russia	1:11:17.0	+2:40.2
21	11	Nicole Fessel	Germany	1:11:17.1	+2:40.3
22	19	Masako Ishida	Japan	1:11:17.8	+2:41.0
23	29	Alisa Zhambalova	Russia	1:11:20.5	+2:43.7
24	44	Kornelia Kubińska	Poland	1:11:34.9	+2:58.1
25	13	Liz Stephen	United States	1:11:46.2	+3:09.4
26	41	Cendrine Browne	Canada	1:11:52.8	+3:16.0
27	38	Kateřina Beroušková	Czech Republic	1:12:24.2	+3:47.4
28	30	Sara Pellegrini	Italy	1:12:24.9	+3:48.1
29	22	Caterina Ganz	Italy	1:12:25.8	+3:49.0
30	31	Yulia Tikhonova	Belarus	1:13:01.9	+4:25.1
31	35	Anna Medvedeva	Russia	1:13:03.2	+4:26.4
32	25	Emma Wikén	Sweden	1:13:04.3	+4:27.5
33	46	Jessica Yeaton	Australia	1:13:08.8	+4:32.0
34	36	Dahria Beatty	Canada	1:13:22.0	+4:45.2
35	40	Barbara Jezeršek	Australia	1:13:24.8	+4:48.0
36	32	Caitlin Compton Gregg	United States	1:13:40.5	+5:03.7
37	21	Victoria Carl	Germany	1:14:38.4	+6:01.6
38	39	Annika Taylor	Great Britain	1:14:56.2	+6:19.4
39	49	Lada Nesterenko	Ukraine	1:15:00.5	+6:23.7
40	33	Emily Nishikawa	Canada	1:15:18.3	+6:41.5
41	42	Katherine Stewart-Jones	Canada	1:15:55.4	+7:18.6
42	48	Timea Lőrincz	Romania	1:16:30.8	+7:54.0
43	47	Tatjana Mannima	Estonia	1:16:37.0	+8:00.2
44	45	Olga Mandrika	Kazakhstan	1:18:17.2	+9:40.4
45	43	Anna Sixtová	Czech Republic	1:21:44.7	+13:07.9
46	51	Jaqueline Mourão	Brazil	1:22:21.4	+13:44.6
47	52	Anda Muižniece	Latvia	1:23:12.7	+14:35.9
—	9	Kerttu Niskanen	Finland	DNF	
—	27	Petra Nováková	Czech Republic	DNF	
—	34	Polina Seronosova	Belarus	DNF	
—	37	Valentyna Shevchenko	Ukraine	DNF	
—	50	Aimee Watson	Australia	DNS	
