= Olga Mandrika =

Kazakhstani cross-country skier (born 1993)

Personal information
- Nationality: Kazakhstan
- Born: 17 June 1993 (age 33)

Sport
- Sport: Skiing

World Cup career
- Seasons: 2015–2017, 2020–
- Indiv. starts: 37
- Indiv. podiums: 0
- Team starts: 4
- Team podiums: 0
- Overall titles: 0 – (114th in 2020)
- Discipline titles: 0
- Updated on 7 April, 2020

Olga Mandrika (born 17 June 1993) is a Kazakhstani cross-country skier who competes internationally.

She competed for Kazakhstan at the FIS Nordic World Ski Championships 2017 in Lahti, Finland.

== Cross-country skiing results ==
All results are sourced from the International Ski Federation (FIS).

=== World Championships ===
Year	Age	10 km individual	15 km skiathlon	30 km mass start	Sprint	4 × 5 km relay	Team sprint
2015	21	67	—	39	—	12	—
2017	23	—	43	44	54	12	—

=== World Cup ===
Season standings
Season	Age	Discipline standings				Ski Tour standings				
Season	Age	Overall	Distance	Sprint	U23	Nordic Opening	Tour de Ski	Ski Tour 2020	World Cup Final	Ski Tour Canada
2015	21	NC	NC	NC	NC	69	—	—N/a	—N/a	—N/a
2016	22	NC	NC	NC	NC	67	—	—N/a	—N/a	—
2017	23	NC	NC	NC	—N/a	DNF	—	—N/a	—	—N/a
2020	26	114	80	NC	—N/a	59	—	47	—N/a	—N/a
