= Cendrine Browne =

Canadian cross-country skier

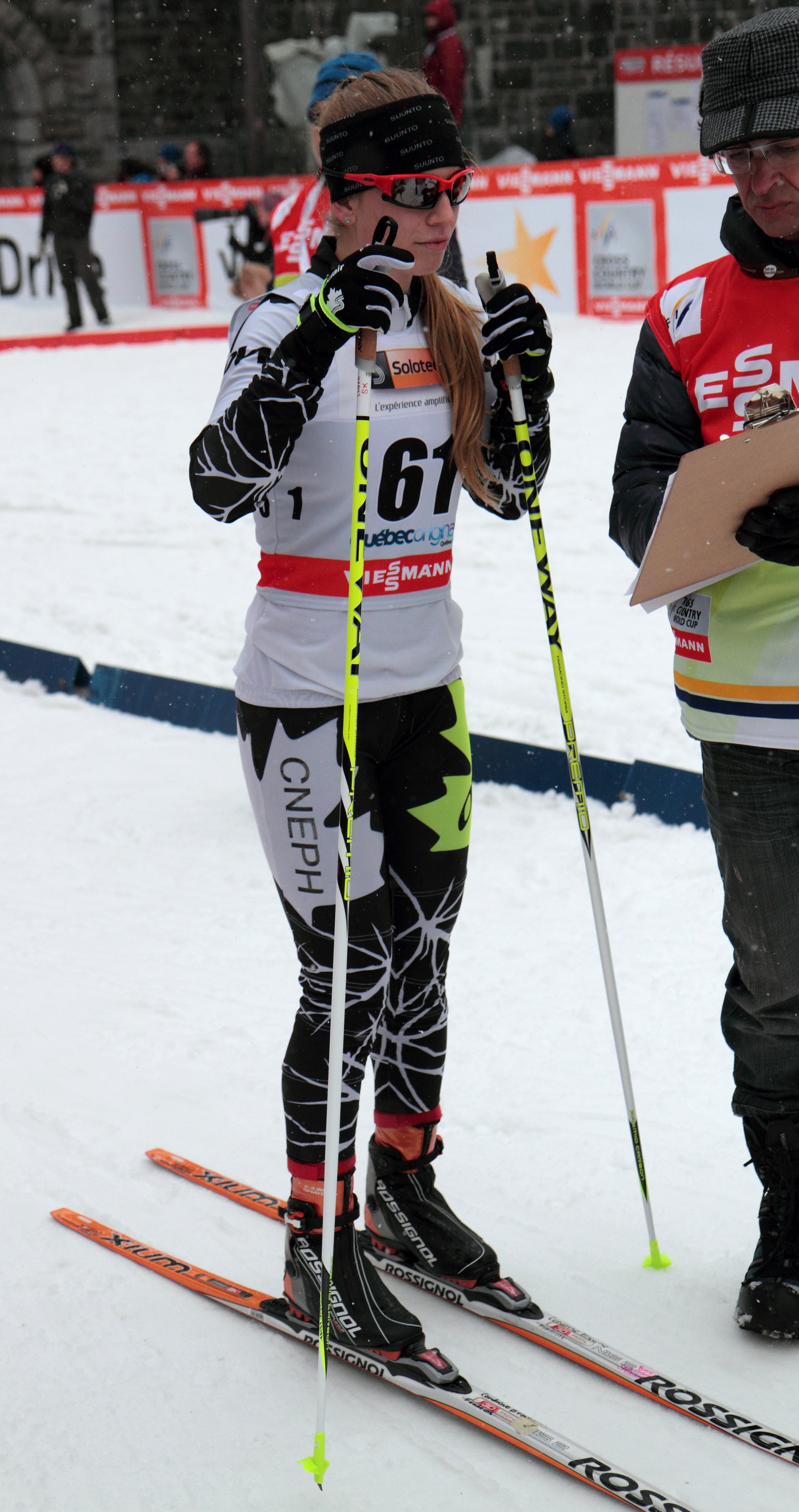
- Cendrine Browne in 2012

Personal information
- Nationality: Canada
- Born: 8 September 1993 (age 32) Barrie, Ontario, Canada
- Height: 163 cm (5 ft 4 in)

Sport
- Sport: Skiing
- Club: Fondeurs Laurentides

World Cup career
- Seasons: 10 – (2013–2022)
- Indiv. starts: 76
- Indiv. podiums: 0
- Team starts: 6
- Team podiums: 0
- Overall titles: 0 – (80th in 2021)
- Discipline titles: 0
- Updated on 19 March 2022

Cendrine Browne (born 8 September 1993) is a Canadian cross-country skier who competes internationally. She competed at the 2022 Winter Olympics, in Women's 10 kilometre classical, Women's 30 kilometre freestyle, Women's 15 kilometre skiathlon, Women's sprint, and Women's 4 × 5 kilometre relay.

== Career ==
She competed for Canada at the FIS Nordic World Ski Championships 2017 in Lahti, Finland, and the 2018 Winter Olympics.

On January 13, 2022, Browne was officially named to Canada's 2022 Olympic team.

== Cross-country skiing results ==
All results are sourced from the International Ski Federation (FIS).

=== Olympic Games ===
Year	Age	10 km individual	15 km skiathlon	30 km mass start	Sprint	4 × 5 km relay	Team sprint
2018	24	43	33	43	51	13	—
2022	28	48	20	16	35	9	—

=== World Championships ===
Year	Age	10 km individual	15 km skiathlon	30 km mass start	Sprint	4 × 5 km relay	Team sprint
2017	23	47	35	26	48	10	13
2019	25	—	40	46	—	12	—
2021	27	27	23	27	—	9	—

=== World Cup ===
==== Season standings ====
Season	Age	Discipline standings			Ski Tour standings				
Season	Age	Overall	Distance	Sprint	Nordic Opening	Tour de Ski	Ski Tour 2020	World Cup Final	Ski Tour Canada
2013	19	NC	—	NC	—	—	—N/a	—	—N/a
2014	20	NC	NC	NC	—	—	—N/a	—	—N/a
2015	21	NC	NC	NC	—	—	—N/a	—N/a	—N/a
2016	22	NC	NC	NC	—	—	—N/a	—N/a	40
2017	23	NC	NC	NC	52	—	—N/a	40	—N/a
2018	24	99	75	NC	72	—	—N/a	39	—N/a
2019	25	NC	NC	NC	—	—	—N/a	57	—N/a
2020	26	104	72	NC	—	—	33	—N/a	—N/a
2021	27	80	53	78	—	—	—N/a	—N/a	—N/a
2022	28	95	63	76	—N/a	—	—N/a	—N/a	—N/a
