= Claudia Salcedo =

Chilean biathlete (born 1980)

Claudia Salcedo Quezada (Latin American Spanish: [ˈklawðja salˈseðo keˈsaða]; born 19 July 1980) is a Chilean cross-country skier, biathlete, and roller skater. She is a member of the Chilean military in addition to sports. She competed for Chile at the 2018 Winter Olympics in cross-country skiing.
