= Katherine Stewart-Jones =

Canadian cross-country skier (born 1995)

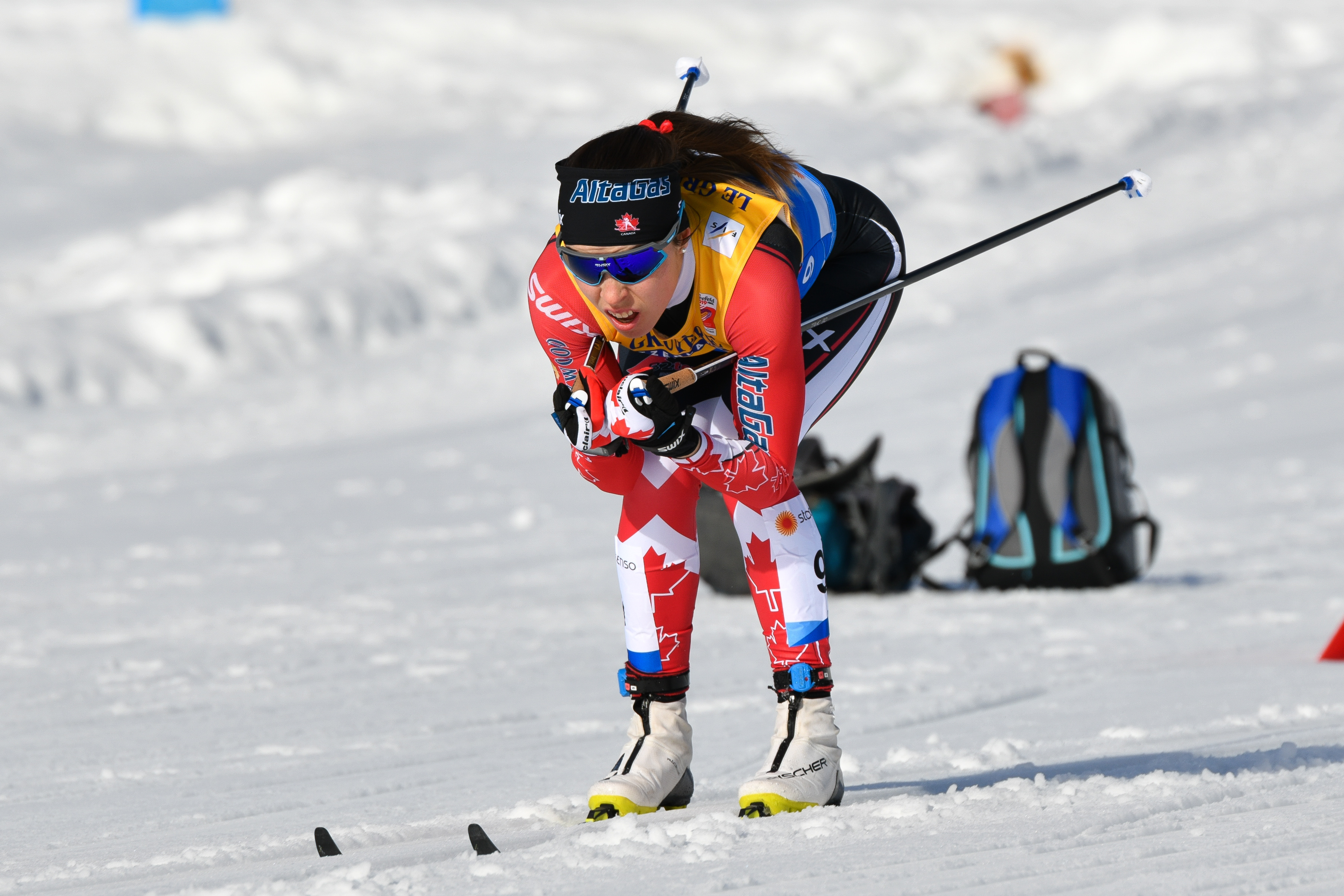
- Stewart-Jones in 2019

Personal information
- Nationality: Canada
- Born: 5 May 1995 (age 31) Ottawa, Ontario, Canada
- Height: 161 cm (5 ft 3 in)

Sport
- Sport: Skiing
- Club: Nakkertok Ski Club

World Cup career
- Seasons: 8 – (2016–present)
- Indiv. starts: 70
- Indiv. podiums: 0
- Team starts: 8
- Team podiums: 0
- Overall titles: 0 – (36th in 2023)
- Discipline titles: 0
- Updated on 27 March 2023

Katherine Stewart-Jones (born 5 May 1995) is a Canadian cross-country skier who competes internationally.

== Career ==
She competed for Canada at the FIS Nordic World Ski Championships 2017 in Lahti, Finland.

On January 13, 2022, Stewart-Jones was officially named to Canada's 2022 Olympic team.

On December 19, 2025, Stewart-Jones was named to Canada's 2026 Olympic Team.

== Cross-country skiing results ==
All results are sourced from the International Ski Federation (FIS).

=== Olympic Games ===
Year	Age	10 km individual	15 km skiathlon	30 km mass start	Sprint	4 × 5 km relay	Team sprint
2022	26	36	23	30	—	9	12
2026	30	47	45	27	—	—	—

=== World Championships ===
Year	Age	10 km individual	15 km skiathlon	30 km mass start	Sprint	4 × 5 km relay	Team sprint
2017	21	36	40	41	58	10	—
2019	23	51	39	28	40	12	—
2021	25	—	28	23	41	9	—
2023	27	27	25	28	—	8	—

=== World Cup ===
==== Season standings ====
Season	Age	Discipline standings				Ski Tour standings				
Season	Age	Overall	Distance	Sprint	U23	Nordic Opening	Tour de Ski	Ski Tour 2020	World Cup Final	Ski Tour Canada
2016	20	NC	NC	NC	NC	—	—	—N/a	—N/a	DNF
2017	21	NC	NC	NC	NC	—	—	—N/a	58	—N/a
2018	22	NC	NC	NC	NC	—	—	—N/a	—	—N/a
2019	23	NC	NC	NC	—N/a	—	—	—N/a	44	—N/a
2020	24	108	NC	NC	—N/a	—	—	29	—N/a	—N/a
2021	25	64	42	84	—N/a	—	—	—N/a	—N/a	—N/a
2022	26	78	51	NC	—N/a	—N/a	—	—N/a	—N/a	—N/a
2023	27	36	20	77	—N/a	—N/a	18	—N/a	—N/a	—N/a
