= Marija Bulatović =

Montenegrin cross-country skier

Personal information
- Nationality: Montenegrin
- Born: 16 May 1995 (age 29)

Sport
- Sport: Cross-country skiing

Marija Bulatović (Montenegrin pronunciation: [mǎrija bulǎːtoʋitɕ]; born 16 May 1995) is a Montenegrin cross-country skier. She competed in the 2018 Winter Olympics.

== Career ==
Bulatović made her debut in the Balkan Cup in March 2013 in Mavrovo, where she finished 15th in the 5 km freestyle event. Her most notable performance in the Balkan Cup occurred in January 2017 in Dvorista, where she achieved seventh place in the 5 km freestyle. During the 2017 Nordic Ski World Championships in Lahti, she secured the 92nd place in the sprint event. The following year, she competed in the Olympic Winter Games in Pyeongchang, finishing 88th in the 10 km freestyle. In the 2021 Nordic Ski World Championships in Oberstdorf, she placed 104th in the sprint and 103rd in the 10 km freestyle.
