= Yulia Tikhonova =

Belarusian cross-country skier (born 1986)

Personal information
- Nationality: Belarus
- Born: 8 April 1986 (age 40) Shchyolkovo

Sport
- Sport: Skiing

Yulia Dmitriyevna Tikhonova (Russian: Юлия Дмитриевна Тихонова, born 8 April 1986) is a Belarusian cross-country skier who competes internationally.

She competed for Belarus at the FIS Nordic World Ski Championships 2017 in Lahti, Finland.
