= FIS Nordic World Ski Championships 2017 – Women's 4 × 5 kilometre relay =

Women's 4 × 5 kilometre relay at the FIS Nordic World Ski Championships 2017
- Location: Lahti, Finland
- Date: 2 March
- Competitors: 64 from 16 nations
- Teams: 16
- Winning time: 52:21.5

Medalists
gold medal	Maiken Caspersen Falla; Heidi Weng; Astrid Uhrenholdt Jacobsen; Marit Bjørgen	Norway
silver medal	Anna Haag; Charlotte Kalla; Ebba Andersson; Stina Nilsson	Sweden
bronze medal	Aino-Kaisa Saarinen; Kerttu Niskanen; Laura Mononen; Krista Pärmäkoski	Finland

The Women's 4 × 5 kilometre relay event of the FIS Nordic World Ski Championships 2017 was held on 2 March 2017.

== Results ==
The race was started at 15:00.

Rank	Bib	Country	Athlete	Time	Deficit
1st place, gold medalist(s)	1	Norway	Maiken Caspersen Falla; Heidi Weng; Astrid Uhrenholdt Jacobsen; Marit Bjørgen	52:21.5; 11:35.0; 12:01.4; 14:07.2; 14:37.9	
2nd place, silver medalist(s)	2	Sweden	Anna Haag; Charlotte Kalla; Ebba Andersson; Stina Nilsson	53:23.1; 11:43.1; 12:05.6; 14:51.6; 14:42.8	+1:01.6
3rd place, bronze medalist(s)	3	Finland	Aino-Kaisa Saarinen; Kerttu Niskanen; Laura Mononen; Krista Pärmäkoski	53:23.6; 11:42.1; 11:53.9; 15:05.9; 14:41.7	+1:02.1
4	4	United States	Kikkan Randall; Sadie Bjornsen; Liz Stephen; Jessie Diggins	53:55.3; 11:59.5; 12:12.7; 14:51.2; 14:51.9	+1:33.8
5	7	Russia	Polina Kalsina; Yuliya Belorukova; Yuliya Chekalyova; Anastasia Sedova	54:50.1; 13:02.4; 12:15.4; 14:31.1; 15:01.2	+2:28.6
6	6	Germany	Katharina Hennig; Stefanie Böhler; Nicole Fessel; Sandra Ringwald	54:59.8; 12:42.3; 12:05.7; 14:41.6; 15:30.2	+2:38.3
7	15	Switzerland	Laurien van der Graaff; Nadine Fähndrich; Nathalie von Siebenthal; Seraina Boner	55:13.6; 12:45.8; 12:28.6; 14:23.9; 15:35.3	+2:52.1
8	5	Poland	Justyna Kowalczyk; Ewelina Marcisz; Kornelia Kubińska; Martyna Galewicz	55:43.5; 11:42.9; 13:04.2; 14:46.1; 16:10.3	+3:22.0
9	8	Italy	Lucia Scardoni; Caterina Ganz; Elisa Brocard; Ilaria Debertolis	56:03.5; 13:09.9; 12:48.1; 14:39.7; 15:25.8	+3:42.0
10	14	Canada	Katherine Stewart-Jones; Emily Nishikawa; Cendrine Browne; Dahria Beatty	56:37.7; 12:43.0; 13:02.4; 14:57.4; 15:54.9	+4:16.2
11	16	Czech Republic	Kateřina Smutná; Kateřina Beroušková; Petra Nováková; Barbora Havlíčková	57:36.5; 12:35.7; 13:16.9; 15:20.4; 16:23.5	+5:15.0
12	11	Kazakhstan	Anna Shevchenko; Anna Stoyan; Olga Mandrika; Irina Bykova	58:28.2; 12:49.3; 13:09.0; 15:39.2; 16:50.7	+6:06.7
13	9	Slovenia	Anamarija Lampič; Katja Višnar; Lea Einfalt; Alenka Čebašek	59:24.5; 12:57.8; 13:06.4; 16:57.2; 16:23.1	+7:03.0
14	12	Estonia	Laura Alba; Anette Veerpalu; Tatjana Mannima; Mariel Merlii Pulles	59:31.1; 13:25.8; 13:36.2; 15:26.9; 17:02.2	+7:09.6
15	13	Australia	Jessica Yeaton; Aimee Watson; Barbara Jezeršek; Katerina Paul	1:01:05.8; 13:26.8; 13:37.0; 15:24.1; 18:37.9	+8:44.3
16	10	Ukraine	Tetyana Antypenko; Yuliya Krol; Lada Nesterenko; Valentyna Shevchenko	LAP; 13:34.7; 14:41.4; LAP	
