= Cross-country skiing at the 2018 Winter Olympics =

Cross-country skiing at the XXIII Olympic Winter Games
- Cross-country skiing pictogram at the 2018 Winter Olympics
- Venue: Alpensia Cross-Country Skiing Centre
- Dates: 10–25 February 2018
- No. of events: 12 (6 men, 6 women)
- Competitors: 313 from 65 nations

Cross-country skiing at the 2018 Winter Olympics was held at the Alpensia Cross-Country Skiing Centre in Pyeongchang, South Korea. The twelve events took place between 10 and 25 February 2018.

== Qualification ==
A maximum of 310 quota spots were available to athletes to compete at the games. A maximum of 20 athletes could be entered by a National Olympic Committee, with a maximum of 12 men or 12 women. There were two qualification standards for the games: an A standard and a B standard.

== Competition schedule ==
The following was the competition schedule for all twelve events.

All times are (UTC+9).

Date	Time	Event
10 February	16:15	Women's skiathlon
11 February	15:15	Men's skiathlon
13 February	17:30	Men's & women's individual sprint qualification classical
13 February	20:00	Men's & women's individual sprint finals classical
15 February	15:30	Women's 10 km freestyle
16 February	15:00	Men's 15 km freestyle
17 February	18:30	Women's 4 × 5 km relay
18 February	15:15	Men's 4 × 10 km relay
21 February	17:00	Women's team sprint freestyle
21 February	19:00	Men's team sprint freestyle
24 February	14:00	Men's 50 km mass start classical
25 February	15:15	Women's 30 km mass start classical

== Medal summary ==
=== Medal table ===
Rank	Nation	Gold	Silver	Bronze	Total
1	Norway	7	4	3	14
2	Sweden	2	3	1	6
3	Finland	1	1	2	4
4	Switzerland	1	0	0	1
4	United States	1	0	0	1
6	Olympic Athletes from Russia	0	3	5	8
7	Italy	0	1	0	1
8	France	0	0	2	2
Totals (8 entries)		12	12	13	37

=== Men's events ===
Event	Gold		Silver		Bronze	
15 km freestyle	Dario Cologna; Switzerland	33:43.9	Simen Hegstad Krüger; Norway	34:02.2	Denis Spitsov; Olympic Athletes from Russia	34:06.9
30 km skiathlon	Simen Hegstad Krüger; Norway	1:16:20.0	Martin Johnsrud Sundby; Norway	1:16:28.0	Hans Christer Holund; Norway	1:16:29.9
50 km classical	Iivo Niskanen; Finland	2:08:22.1	Alexander Bolshunov; Olympic Athletes from Russia	2:08:40.8	Andrey Larkov; Olympic Athletes from Russia	2:10:59.6
4 × 10 km relay	Norway; Didrik Tønseth; Martin Johnsrud Sundby; Simen Hegstad Krüger; Johannes Høsflot Klæbo	1:33:04.9	Olympic Athletes from Russia; Andrey Larkov; Alexander Bolshunov; Aleksey Chervotkin; Denis Spitsov	1:33:14.3	France; Jean-Marc Gaillard; Maurice Manificat; Clément Parisse; Adrien Backscheider	1:33:41.8
Sprint classical	Johannes Høsflot Klæbo; Norway	3:05.75	Federico Pellegrino; Italy	3:07.09	Alexander Bolshunov; Olympic Athletes from Russia	3:07.11
Team sprint freestyle	Norway; Martin Johnsrud Sundby; Johannes Høsflot Klæbo	15:56.26	Olympic Athletes from Russia; Denis Spitsov; Alexander Bolshunov	15:57.97	France; Maurice Manificat; Richard Jouve	15:58.28

=== Women's events ===
Event	Gold		Silver		Bronze	
10 km freestyle	Ragnhild Haga; Norway	25:00.5	Charlotte Kalla; Sweden	25:20.8	Marit Bjørgen; Norway Krista Pärmäkoski; Finland	25:32.4
15 km skiathlon	Charlotte Kalla; Sweden	40:44.9	Marit Bjørgen; Norway	40:52.7	Krista Pärmäkoski; Finland	40:55.0
30 km classical	Marit Bjørgen; Norway	1:22:17.6	Krista Pärmäkoski; Finland	1:24:07.1	Stina Nilsson; Sweden	1:24:16.5
4 × 5 km relay	Norway; Ingvild Flugstad Østberg; Astrid Uhrenholdt Jacobsen; Ragnhild Haga; Marit Bjørgen	51:24.3	Sweden; Anna Haag; Charlotte Kalla; Ebba Andersson; Stina Nilsson	51:26.3	Olympic Athletes from Russia; Natalia Nepryaeva; Yulia Belorukova; Anastasia Sedova; Anna Nechaevskaya	52:07.6
Sprint classical	Stina Nilsson; Sweden	3:03.84	Maiken Caspersen Falla; Norway	3:06.87	Yulia Belorukova; Olympic Athletes from Russia	3:07.21
Team sprint freestyle	United States; Kikkan Randall; Jessie Diggins	15:56.47	Sweden; Charlotte Kalla; Stina Nilsson	15:56.66	Norway; Marit Bjørgen; Maiken Caspersen Falla	15:59.44

== Participating nations ==
A total of 313 athletes from 65 nations (including the IOC's designation of Olympic Athletes from Russia) were scheduled to participate (the numbers of athletes are shown in parentheses).

- Andorra (1)
- Argentina (2)
- Armenia (2)
- Australia (6)
- Austria (7)
- Belarus (9)
- Belgium (1)
- Bermuda (1)
- Bolivia (1)
- Bosnia and Herzegovina (2)
- Brazil (2)
- Bulgaria (3)
- Canada (11)
- Chile (2)
- China (4)
- Colombia (1)
- Croatia (4)
- Czech Republic (10)
- Denmark (1)
- Ecuador (1)
- Estonia (7)
- Finland (19)
- France (13)
- Germany (16)
- Great Britain (4)
- Greece (2)
- Hungary (2)
- Iceland (3)
- India (1)
- Iran (2)
- Ireland (1)
- Italy (15)
- Japan (2)
- Kazakhstan (7)
- Kyrgyzstan (1)
- Latvia (3)
- Lebanon (1)
- Liechtenstein (1)
- Lithuania (3)
- Macedonia (2)
- Mexico (1)
- Moldova (1)
- Mongolia (2)
- Montenegro (1)
- Morocco (1)
- North Korea (3)
- Norway (20)
- Olympic Athletes from Russia (12)
- Pakistan (1)
- Poland (7)
- Portugal (1)
- Romania (3)
- Serbia (1)
- Slovakia (5)
- Slovenia (8)
- South Korea (4)
- Spain (2)
- Sweden (20)
- Switzerland (13)
- Thailand (2)
- Togo (1)
- Tonga (1)
- Turkey (3)
- Ukraine (4)
- United States (20)
