= FIS Cross-Country Alpen Cup =

- Genre: Cross-country skiing
- Date: Northern wintertime season
- Begins: November
- Ends: March
- Locations: Alpine countries: Andorra; Austria; Czech Republic; France; Germany; Italy; Liechtenstein; Slovenia; Spain; Switzerland
- Inaugurated: 2004
- Organiser: International Ski Federation

The FIS Cross-Country Alpen Cup, OPA Alpen Cup (alpine nations ski association) or simply Alpen Cup is one of the nine FIS Cross-Country Continental Cups, a series of second-level cross-country skiing competitions ranked below the Cross-Country World Cup. It is arranged by the International Ski Federation (FIS) and the ski associations of the alpine countries.

== History ==
After the Alpen Cup had been held as a junior series for several years, the 2004 FIS Congress in Miami incorporated Alpen Cup as an official continental cup, ranked as a second-level competition ranked below the Cross-Country World Cup. Even today there is still a Youth Alpen Cup, which is held under the name Under-18 according to the same rules as the senior's Alpen Cup. Cross-country skiers from all member associations affiliated to the International Ski Federation can take part in Alpen Cup, but only athletes from OPA members can collect points according to the FIS points system. These member associations are Andorra, Austria, Czech Republic, France, Germany, Italy, Liechtenstein, Slovenia, Spain and Switzerland. At the end of each season, the overall winner will be determined from the points awarded, which will then get a personal starting place in the beginning of the following World Cup season.

In contrast to World Cup ratings, the three worst results can be removed out of the overall ranking, but only if more than twelve competitions are held in the relevant season. In the competitions themselves, there is also a U-20 rating for women and men in addition to the senior's competition. In addition to the overall ranking, winners are also determined in the sprint and distance rankings. The best nation is also honoured. The overall winners receive trophies and prize money.

Similar to the Tour de Ski in the World Cup, two mini-tours over three stages each are being held as part of the Alpen Cup. The top 30 athletes on the mini-tour will be awarded double points for the overall standings. In addition, the European Cross-Country Skiing Championship has been held annually as a U-18 competition of the European Ski Federation (ESF) as part of the Alpen Cup since 2011.

== World Cup qualification ==
In the end of certain periods, the overall leaders for both genders receive a place in the World Cup in the following period. The overall winners of the season receive a place in the World Cup in the beginning of the following season.

== Overall winners ==
=== Men ===
Season	Winner	Second	Third
2004–05	(Italy) Roland Clara	(Italy) Thomas Moriggl	(Germany) Tom Reichelt
2005–06	(Italy) Loris Frasnelli	(France) Benoît Chauvet	(Italy) Florian Kostner
2006–07	(Switzerland) Dario Cologna	(Italy) Giovanni Gullo	(Italy) David Hofer
2007–08	(Italy) Florian Kostner (1)	(Germany) Tom Reichelt	(Germany) Kay Bochert
2008–09	(Italy) Florian Kostner (2)	(Italy) Fulvio Scola	(France) Benoît Chauvet
2009–10	(Italy) Dietmar Nöckler	(Italy) Fulvio Scola	(Germany) Andreas Katz
2010–11	(Germany) Andy Kühne	(Germany) Thomas Bing	(Italy) Luca Orlandi
2011–12	(Switzerland) Marco Mühlematter	(France) Ivan Perrillat Boiteux	(Switzerland) Jonas Baumann
2012–13	(Germany) Franz Göring	(Germany) Sebastian Eisenlauer	(Germany) Lucas Bögl
2013–14	(France) Paul Goalabre (1)	(Italy) Francesco De Fabiani	(Germany) Andy Kühne
2014–15	(France) Paul Goalabre (2)	(Germany) Markus Weeger	(Italy) Giandomenico Salvadori
2015–16	(Italy) Giandomenico Salvadori	(France) Damien Tarantola	(France) Valentin Chauvin
2016–17	(Italy) Maicol Rastelli	(Italy) Sergio Rigoni	(Andorra) Irineu Esteve Altimiras
2017–18	(France) Jean Tiberghien (1)	(Switzerland) Beda Klee	(France) Valentin Chauvin
2018–19	(France) Valentin Chauvin	(France) Jean Tiberghien	(Italy) Simone Daprà
2019–20	(France) Jean Tiberghien (2)	(France) Jules Chappaz	(Italy) Stefano Gardener
2020–21	(France) Arnaud Chautemps	(France) Renaud Jay	(Germany) Friedrich Moch

=== Women ===
Season	Winner	Second	Third
2004–05	(France) Coraline Hugue	(Germany) Nicole Fessel	(Germany) Katrin Zeller
2005–06	(Germany) Katrin Zeller	(Italy) Magda Genuin	(Germany) Anke Reschwamm Schulze
2006–07	(Italy) Marina Piller	(Germany) Antje Mämpel	(France) Émilie Vina
2007–08	(Germany) Manuela Henkel	(Italy) Karin Moroder	(Switzerland) Doris Trachsel
2008–09	(Italy) Silvia Rupil	(Spain) Laura Orgué	(Switzerland) Ursina Badilatti
2009–10	(France) Anouk Faivre Picon	(Italy) Virginia De Martin Topranin	(Germany) Denise Herrmann
2010–11	(Germany) Monique Siegel (1)	(France) Elodie Bourgeois Pin	(France) Coraline Hugue
2011–12	(France) Célia Aymonier	(Italy) Lucia Scardoni	(Germany) Sandra Ringwald
2012–13	(Germany) Monique Siegel (2)	(Germany) Sandra Ringwald	(Spain) Laura Orgué
2013–14	(Italy) Francesca Baudin	(Italy) Sara Pellegrini	(Italy) Giulia Stürz
2014–15	(Italy) Lucia Scardoni	(Italy) Giulia Stürz	(Germany) Elisabeth Schicho
2015–16	(Germany) Julia Belger	(Germany) Monique Siegel	(Germany) Laura Gimmler
2016–17	(Italy) Caterina Ganz	(Germany) Theresa Eichhorn	(Germany) Pia Fink
2017–18	(Germany) Antonia Fräbel (1)	(Italy) Sara Pellegrini	(Germany) Julia Belger
2018–19	(Germany) Antonia Fräbel (2)	(Switzerland) Lydia Hiernickel	(Italy) Ilaria Debertolis
2019–20	(Italy) Ilaria Debertolis	(Italy) Sara Pellegrini	(Italy) Elisa Brocard
2020–21	(Germany) Lisa Lohmann	(Switzerland) Désirée Steiner	(Germany) Coletta Ryzdek
