= 2018–19 FIS Cross-Country Alpen Cup =

Discipline	Men	Women
Overall	(France) Valentin Chauvin	(Germany) Antonia Fräbel (2nd title)

Competition
Locations	6 venues	6 venues
Individual	14 events	14 events
Cancelled	2 events	2 events

The 2018–19 FIS Cross-Country Alpen Cup (OPA Cup) was a season of the Alpen Cup, a Continental Cup season in cross-country skiing for men and women. The season began on 21 December 2018 in Valdidentro, Italy and concluded on 17 March 2019 in Oberwiesenthal, Germany.

== Calendar ==
=== Men ===
Key: C – Classic / F – Freestyle
Period	Race	Date	Place	Discipline	Winner	Second	Third	Ref.
I		8 December 2018	(France) Prémanon	10 km C	Cancelled			
I		9 December 2018	(France) Prémanon	15 km F	Cancelled			
I	1	21 December 2018	(Italy) Valdidentro	Sprint F	(France) Richard Jouve	(France) Valentin Chauvin	(Switzerland) Joeri Kindschi	
I	2	22 December 2018	(Italy) Valdidentro	15 km F	(Germany) Andreas Katz	(Germany) Thomas Bing	(France) Hugo Baffard	
I	3	23 December 2018	(Italy) Valdidentro	15 km C Mass Start	(France) Maurice Manificat	(Italy) Maicol Rastelli	(Switzerland) Beda Klee	
II	4	4 January 2019	(Czech Republic) Nové Město na Moravě	Sprint C	(France) Valentin Chauvin	(Italy) Gilberto Panisi	(Czech Republic) Michal Novák	
II	5	5 January 2019	(Czech Republic) Nové Město na Moravě	15 km F	(France) Robin Duvillard	(Czech Republic) Michal Novák	(France) Hugo Buffard	
II	6	6 January 2019	(Czech Republic) Nové Město na Moravě	20 km C Mass Start	(France) Valentin Chauvin	(Switzerland) Ueli Schnider	(Italy) Simone Daprà	
III	7	8 February 2019	(Slovenia) Planica	Sprint F	(France) Jules Chappaz	(Italy) Davide Graz	(Germany) Maxim Cervinka	
III	8	9 February 2019	(Slovenia) Planica	15 km C	(Kazakhstan) Alexey Poltoranin	(Estonia) Karel Tammjärv	(Poland) Dominik Bury	
III	9	10 February 2019	(Slovenia) Planica	20 km F Mass Start	(Austria) Max Hauke	(Poland) Dominik Bury	(Austria) Bernhard Tritscher	
IV	10	2 March 2019	(Switzerland) Le Brassus	15 km F	(France) Hugo Lapalus	(France) Jean Tiberghien	(France) Hugo Buffard	
IV	11	3 March 2019	(Switzerland) Le Brassus	15 km C Pursuit	(France) Valentin Chauvin	(France) Jean Tiberghien	(France) Hugo Lapalus	
IV	12	15 March 2019	(Germany) Oberwiesenthal	Sprint F	(Switzerland) Janik Riebli	(Switzerland) Erwan Käser	(France) Clement Arnault	
IV	13	16 March 2019	(Germany) Oberwiesenthal	15 km C Mass Start	(France) Valentin Chauvin	(France) Clement Arnault	(Switzerland) Ueli Schnider	
IV	14	17 March 2019	(Germany) Oberwiesenthal	15 km F Pursuit	(France) Clement Arnault	(Italy) Simone Daprà	(Germany) Valentin Mättig	

=== Women ===
Key: C – Classic / F – Freestyle
Period	Race	Date	Place	Discipline	Winner	Second	Third	Ref.
I		8 December 2018	(France) Prémanon	5 km C	Cancelled			
I		9 December 2018	(France) Prémanon	10 km F	Cancelled			
I	1	21 December 2018	(Italy) Valdidentro	Sprint F	(Switzerland) Laurien van der Graaff	(Italy) Ilaria Debertolis	(Germany) Victoria Carl	
I	2	22 December 2018	(Italy) Valdidentro	10 km F	(Italy) Elisa Brocard	(France) Anouk Faivre Picon	(Germany) Katharina Hennig	
I	3	23 December 2018	(Italy) Valdidentro	10 km C Mass Start	(Germany) Antonia Fräbel	(France) Anouk Faivre Picon	(Italy) Anna Comarella	
II	4	4 January 2019	(Czech Republic) Nové Město na Moravě	Sprint C	(Germany) Antonia Fräbel	(Switzerland) Fabiana Wieser	(Switzerland) Désirée Steiner	
II	5	5 January 2019	(Czech Republic) Nové Město na Moravě	10 km F	(Germany) Antonia Fräbel	(Italy) Anna Comarella	(Germany) Sofie Krehl	
II	6	6 January 2019	(Czech Republic) Nové Město na Moravě	15 km C Mass Start	(Germany) Antonia Fräbel	(Italy) Anna Comarella	(Switzerland) Lydia Hiernickel	
III	7	8 February 2019	(Slovenia) Planica	Sprint F	(Italy) Ilaria Debertolis	(Italy) Elisa Brocard	(Italy) Lucia Scardoni	
III	8	9 February 2019	(Slovenia) Planica	10 km C	(Italy) Lucia Scardoni	(Italy) Sara Pellegrini	(Germany) Nadine Herrmann	
III	9	10 February 2019	(Slovenia) Planica	15 km F Mass Start	(Italy) Ilaria Debertolis	(France) Laura Chamiot Maitral	(Italy) Elisa Brocard	
IV	10	2 March 2019	(Switzerland) Le Brassus	10 km F	(France) Laura Chamiot Maitral	(France) Coralie Bentz	(United States) Hailey Swirbul	
IV	11	3 March 2019	(Switzerland) Le Brassus	15 km C Pursuit	(Germany) Julia Belger	(United States) Hailey Swirbul	(France) Laura Chamiot Maitral	
IV	12	15 March 2019	(Germany) Oberwiesenthal	Sprint F	(Czech Republic) Katerina Janatová	(Italy) Ilaria Debertolis	(Czech Republic) Petra Hynčicová	
IV	13	16 March 2019	(Germany) Oberwiesenthal	10 km C Mass Start	(Germany) Antonia Fräbel	(Czech Republic) Kateřina Razýmová	(Austria) Lisa Unterweger	
IV	14	17 March 2019	(Germany) Oberwiesenthal	10 km F Pursuit	(Czech Republic) Kateřina Razýmová	(Germany) Antonia Fräbel	(United States) Hailey Swirbul	

== Overall standings ==
=== Men's overall standings ===
Rank		Points
1	(France) Valentin Chauvin	675
2	(France) Jean Tiberghien	484
3	(Italy) Simone Daprà	387
4	(France) Clement Arnault	372
5	(France) Hugo Lapalus	348
6	(Switzerland) Ueli Schnider	317
7	(Switzerland) Cedric Steiner	289
8	(France) Hugo Buffard	269
9	(Germany) Valentin Mättig	265
10	(Switzerland) Dajan Danuser	223

=== Women's overall standings ===
Rank		Points
1	(Germany) Antonia Fräbel	821
2	(Switzerland) Lydia Hiernickel	460
3	(Italy) Ilaria Debertolis	451
4	(France) Laura Chamiot Maitral	427
5	(Germany) Nadine Herrmann	376
6	(Italy) Sara Pellegrini	329
7	(Italy) Elisa Brocard	290
8	(France) Coraline Bentz	283
9	(Germany) Katherine Sauerbrey	277
10	(Italy) Anna Comarella	274
