= Katja Višnar =

Slovenian cross-country skier

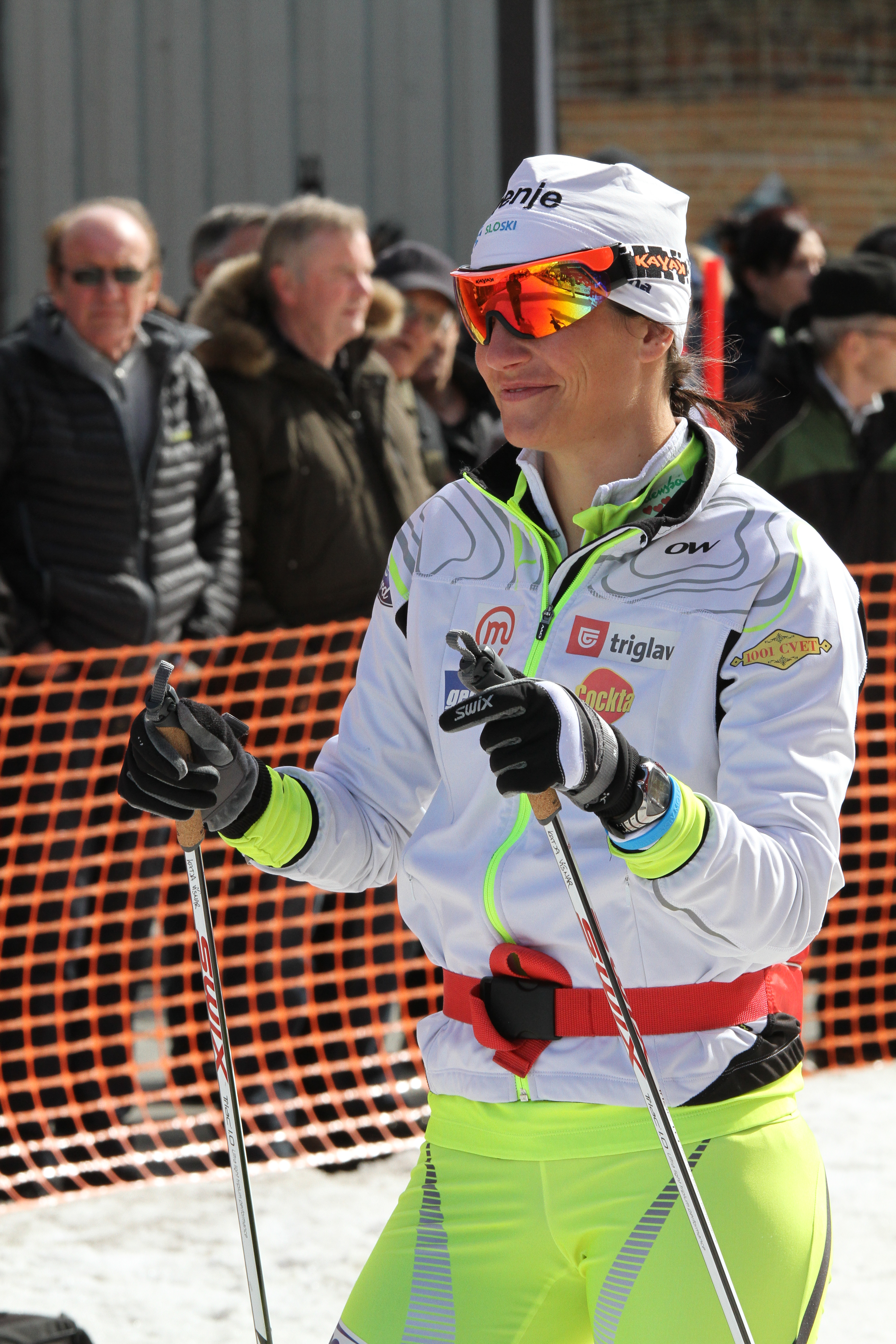
- Katja Višnar at "Bysprinten" Mosjøen (2013)

Personal information
- Nationality: Slovenia
- Born: 21 March 1984 (age 42) Bled, SR Slovenia, Yugoslavia
- Height: 1.74 m (5 ft 9 in)
- Spouse: Ola Vigen Hattestad

Sport
- Sport: Skiing
- Club: TSK Bled

World Cup career
- Seasons: 13 – (2007–2015, 2017–2020)
- Indiv. starts: 161
- Indiv. podiums: 3
- Indiv. wins: 0
- Team starts: 20
- Team podiums: 1
- Team wins: 0
- Overall titles: 0 – (22nd in 2014)
- Discipline titles: 0
Medal record
Women's cross-country skiing
Representing Slovenia
World Championships
Silver medal – second place	2019 Seefeld	Team sprint
- Updated on 30 March 2020

Katja Višnar (born 21 March 1984) is a Slovenian, former cross-country skier who competed between 2002 and 2020. At the 2010 Winter Olympics in Vancouver, she finished 11th in the team sprint, 15th in the 4 × 5 km relay, and 16th in the individual sprint events.

Višnar's best finish at the FIS Nordic World Ski Championships was second in the team sprint event at Seefeld in 2019 in pair with Anamarija Lampič.

Her best World Cup finish was second in a team sprint event in Russia in January 2010 and her best individual sprint finish was ninth at that same event. On 5 February 2011 she repeated her success at the World Cup finishing second in the sprint in Russia behind her compatriot Vesna Fabjan.

She announced her retirement from cross-country skiing in January 2020.

== Cross-country skiing results ==
All results are sourced from the International Ski Federation (FIS).

=== Olympic Games ===
Year	Age	10 km individual	15 km skiathlon	30 km mass start	Sprint	4 × 5 km relay	Team sprint
2010	25	—	—	—	16	14	10
2014	29	52	—	—	9	10	9
2018	33	—	—	—	16	8	—

=== World Championships ===
- 1 medal – (1 silver)

Year	Age	10 km individual	15 km skiathlon	30 km mass start	Sprint	4 × 5 km relay	Team sprint
2007	22	66	—	—	38	—	—
2009	24	—	—	—	26	—	—
2011	26	—	—	—	21	—	5
2013	28	—	—	—	4	14	6
2015	30	35	—	—	11	10	9
2017	32	46	—	—	21	13	8
2019	34	—	—	—	26	9	Silver

=== World Cup ===
==== Season standings ====
Season	Age	Discipline standings			Ski Tour standings			
Season	Age	Overall	Distance	Sprint	Nordic Opening	Tour de Ski	Ski Tour 2020	World Cup Final
2007	23	101	—	70	—N/a	—	—N/a	—N/a
2008	24	55	NC	39	—N/a	DNF	—N/a	DNF
2009	25	63	NC	40	—N/a	—	—N/a	DNF
2010	26	44	NC	11	—N/a	—	—N/a	42
2011	27	30	NC	8	DNF	—	—N/a	DNF
2012	28	35	NC	13	DNF	DNF	—N/a	45
2013	29	40	NC	14	DNF	—	—N/a	DNF
2014	30	22	82	6	59	—	—N/a	41
2015	31	25	NC	6	DNF	—	—N/a	—N/a
2017	33	39	NC	16	DNF	DNF	—N/a	41
2018	34	46	NC	16	DNF	—	—N/a	DNF
2019	35	32	NC	13	54	DNF	—N/a	55
2020	36	46	NC	18	DNF	DNF	DNF	—N/a

==== Individual podiums ====
- 3 podiums – (3 WC)

No.	Season	Date	Location	Race	Level	Place
1	2010–11	5 February 2011	Rybinsk, Russia	1.3 km Sprint F	World Cup	2nd
2	2013–14	1 March 2014	Lahti, Finland	1.55 km Sprint F	World Cup	2nd
3	2014–15	29 November 2014	Rukatunturi, Finland	1.4 km Sprint C	World Cup	2nd

==== Team podiums ====
- 1 podium – (1 TS)

No.	Season	Date	Location	Race	Level	Place	Teammate
1	2009–10	24 January 2010	Rybinsk, Russia	6 × 1.3 km Team Sprint F	World Cup	2nd	Fabjan
