= Rosie Brennan =

American cross-country skier (born 1988)

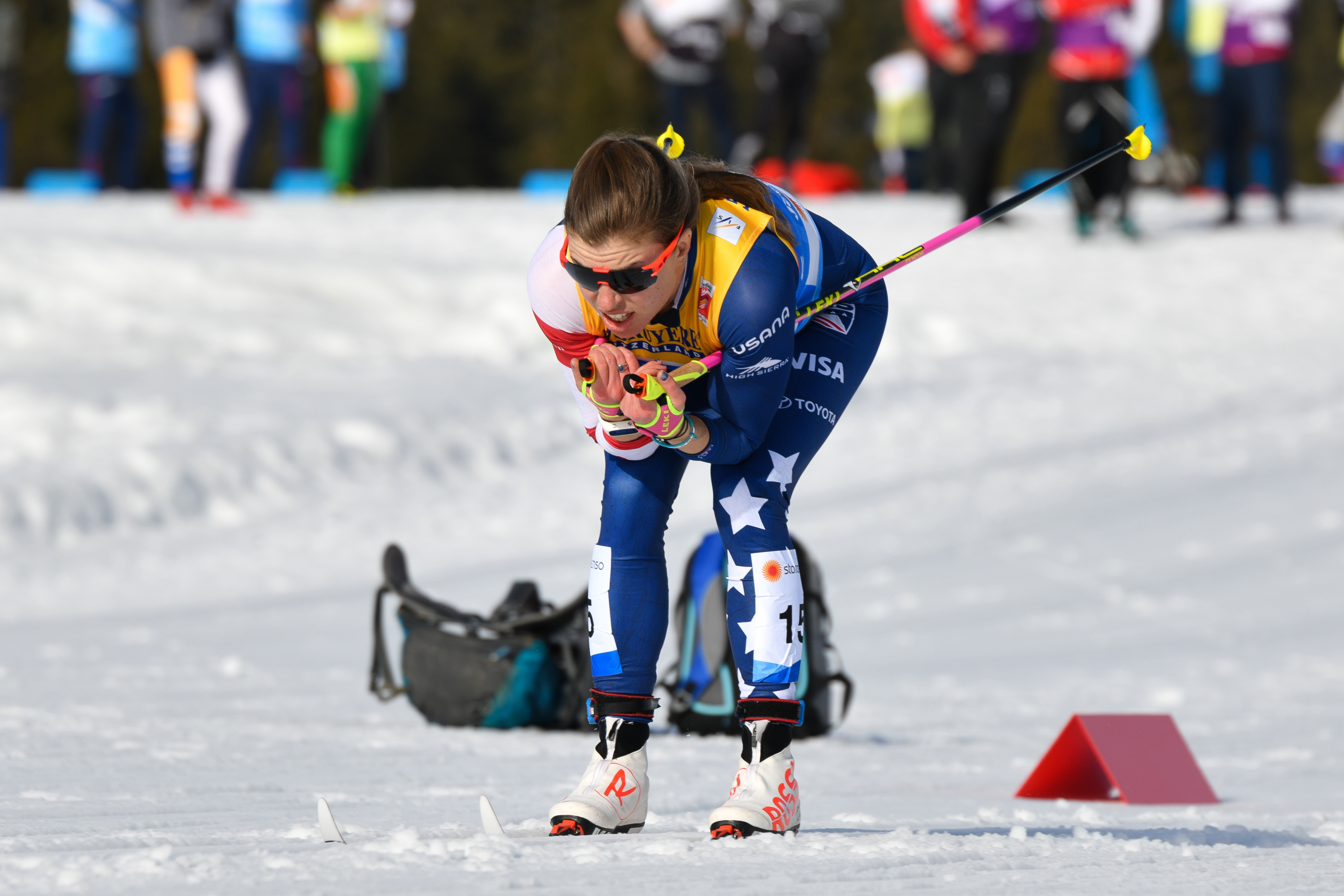
- Brennan in 2019

Personal information
- Nationality: United States
- Born: 2 December 1988 (age 37) Park City, Utah, U.S.

Sport
- Sport: Skiing
- Club: APU Nordic Ski Center

World Cup career
- Seasons: 13 – (2009, 2013–present)
- Indiv. starts: 228
- Indiv. podiums: 12
- Indiv. wins: 2
- Team starts: 15
- Team podiums: 6
- Team wins: 1
- Overall titles: 0 – (4th in 2021, 4th in 2023, 7th in 2024)
- Discipline titles: 0
- Updated on 12 March 2024

Rosie Brennan (born December 2, 1988) is an American cross-country skier. On 13 December 2020, she became the second American cross-country skier to win back-to-back World Cup races, after Kikkan Randall in 2011. She has represented the United States at several World Championships and Winter Olympic Games.

== Early life and education ==
Brenan was born and raised in Park City, Utah. She started skiing at the age of 14. She attended Park City High School.

Brenan earned a bachelor's degree in geography at Dartmouth College and a master's degree from Alaska Pacific University.

== Career ==
She represented the United States at the 2015 World Championships in Falun, the 2017 World Championships in Lahti, the 2018 Winter Olympics, and the 2019 World Championships in Seefeld.

Brennan competed at the 2024 Stifel Loppet Cup in Minneapolis—the first World Cup cross-country skiing race held in the United States in 23 years. While she did not make a podium at the competition, she was able to earn enough points to be in the fifth position in the overall leaderboard for the season standings.

On 1 May 2026, she announced her retirement from competitive cross-country skiing.

== Cross-country skiing results ==
All results are sourced from the International Ski Federation (FIS).

=== Olympic Games ===
Year	Age	10 km individual	15/20 km skiathlon	30/50 km mass start	Sprint	4 × 5/7.5 km relay	Team sprint
2018	29	—	58	—	—	—	—
2022	33	13	14	6	4	6	5
2026	37	—	37	15	—	5	—

=== World Championships ===
Year	Age	10 km individual	15/20 km skiathlon	30/50 km mass start	Sprint	4 × 5/7.5 km relay	Team sprint
2015	26	—	30	16	—	4	—
2017	28	32	28	—	—	—	—
2019	30	24	10	16	—	5	—
2021	32	17	—	—	34	4	5
2023	34	15	19	5	7	5	—
2025	36	22			30	6	

=== World Cup ===
==== Season standings ====
Season	Age	Discipline standings			Ski Tour standings				
Season	Age	Overall	Distance	Sprint	Nordic Opening	Tour de Ski	Ski Tour 2020	World Cup Final	Ski Tour Canada
2009	20	NC	—	NC	—N/a	—	—N/a	—	—N/a
2013	24	NC	NC	NC	—	—	—N/a	43	—N/a
2014	25	NC	NC	NC	70	—	—N/a	—	—N/a
2015	26	87	56	NC	—	—	—N/a	—N/a	—N/a
2016	27	54	42	NC	34	32	—N/a	—N/a	24
2017	28	65	47	82	41	28	—N/a	42	—N/a
2018	29	55	45	54	28	24	—N/a	DNF	—N/a
2019	30	38	27	54	15	—	—N/a	39	—N/a
2020	31	17	14	35	10	15	12	—N/a	—N/a
2021	32	4	4	9	5	6	—N/a	—N/a	—N/a
2022	33	14	10	12	—N/a	—	—N/a	—N/a	—N/a
2023	34	4	6	16	—N/a	4	—N/a	—N/a	—N/a
2024	35	7	7	10	—N/a	12	—N/a	—N/a	—N/a

==== Individual podiums ====
- 2 victories – (2 WC)
- 12 podiums – (8 WC, 4 SWC)

No.	Season	Date	Location	Race	Level	Place
1	2020–21	29 November 2020	Rukatunturi, Finland	10 km Pursuit F	Stage World Cup	3rd
2	2020–21	12 December 2020	Davos, Switzerland	1.5 km Sprint F	World Cup	1st
3	2020–21	13 December 2020	Davos, Switzerland	10 km Individual F	World Cup	1st
4	2020–21	3 January 2021	Val Müstair, Switzerland	10 km Pursuit F	Stage World Cup	2nd
5	2020–21	5 January 2021	Toblach, Italy	10 km Individual F	Stage World Cup	2nd
6	2021–22	4 December 2021	Lillehammer, Norway	10 km Individual F	World Cup	3rd
7	2022–23	18 December 2022	Davos, Switzerland	20 km Individual F	World Cup	3rd
8	2023–24	25 November 2023	Rukatunturi, Finland	10 km Individual C	World Cup	2nd
9	2023–24	26 November 2023	Rukatunturi, Finland	20 km Mass Start F	World Cup	3rd
10	2023–24	17 December 2023	Trondheim, Norway	10 km Individual C	World Cup	2nd
11	2023–24	4 January 2024	Davos, Switzerland	20 km Pursuit C	Stage World Cup	2nd
12	2023–24	12 March 2024	Drammen, Norway	1.2 km Sprint C	World Cup	3rd

==== Team podiums ====
- 1 victory – (1 RL)
- 6 podiums – (5 RL, 1 TS)

No.	Season	Date	Location	Race	Level	Place	Teammate(s)
1	2015-16	6 December 2015	Lillehammer, Norway	4 × 5 km Relay C/F	World Cup	3rd	Bjornsen / Stephen / Diggins
2	2019-20	8 December 2019	Lillehammer, Norway	4 × 5 km Relay C/F	World Cup	2nd	Caldwell / Maubet Bjornsen / Diggins
3	2021-22	13 March 2022	Falun, Sweden	4 × 5 km Mixed Relay F	World Cup	1st	Ketterson / Patterson / Diggins
4	2022–23	22 January 2023	Livigno, Italy	6 × 1.2 km Team Sprint F	World Cup	3rd	Kern
5	2022–23	5 February 2023	Toblach, Italy	4 × 7.5 km Relay C/F	World Cup	3rd	Swirbul / Diggins / Kern
6	2023–24	3 December 2023	Gällivare, Sweden	4 × 7.5 km Relay C/F	World Cup	3rd	Diggins / Laukli / Kern
