= Lydia Mettler =

Swiss cross-country skier

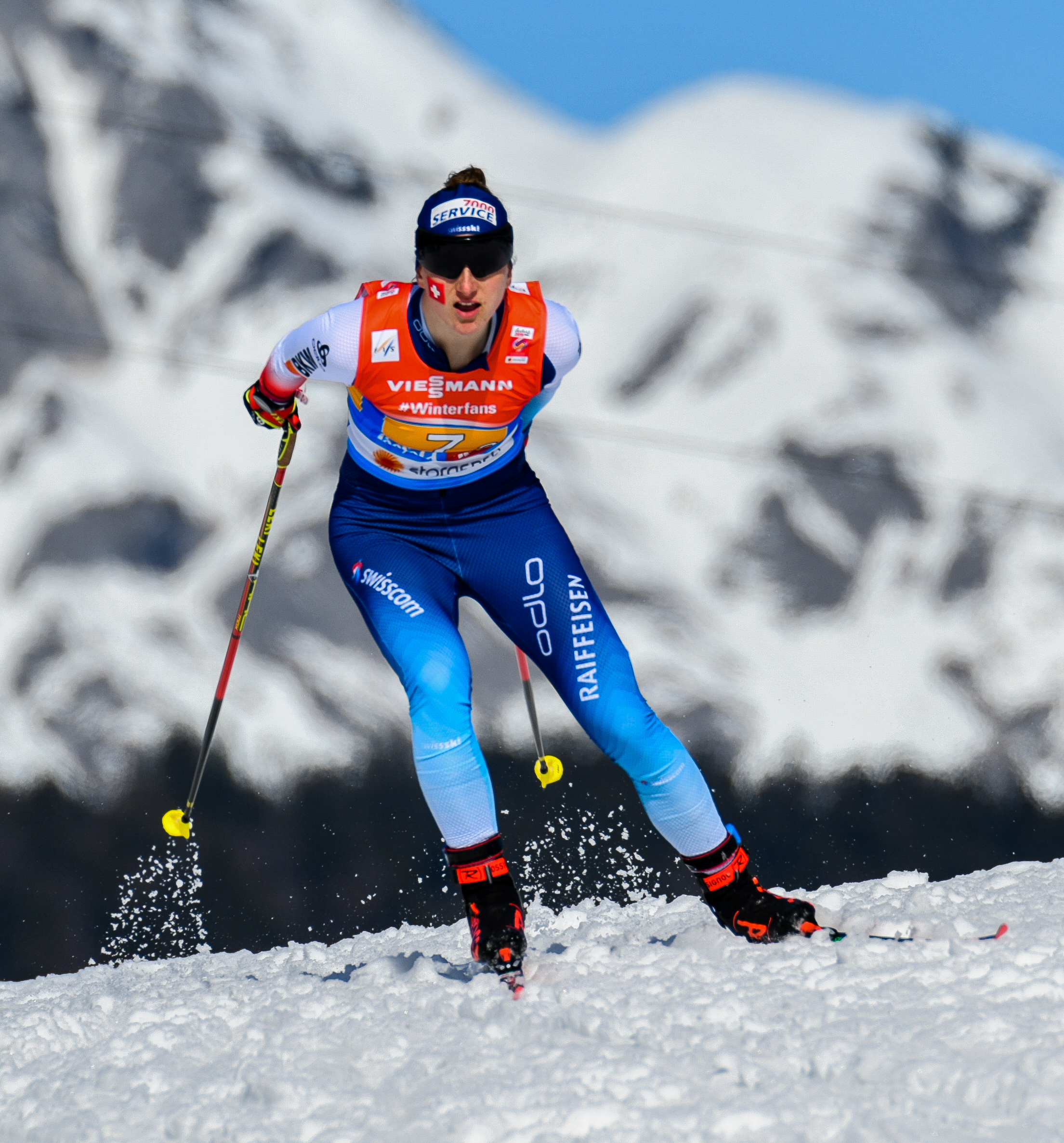
- Lydia Mettler in 2019

Personal information
- Nationality: Switzerland
- Born: 23 December 1996 (age 29) Schwanden, Switzerland

Sport
- Sport: Skiing
- Club: Gardes-Frontière

World Cup career
- Seasons: 5 – (2018–present)
- Indiv. starts: 23
- Indiv. podiums: 0
- Team starts: 2
- Team podiums: 0
- Overall titles: 0 – (90th in 2022)
- Discipline titles: 0
- Updated on 16 March 2022

Lydia Mettler (née Hiernickel; born 23 December 1996) is a Swiss biathlete and former cross-country skier. She competed in the women's 10 kilometre freestyle at the 2018 Winter Olympics.

== Cross-country skiing results ==
All results are sourced from the International Ski Federation (FIS).

=== Olympic Games ===
Year	Age	10 km individual	15 km skiathlon	30 km mass start	Sprint	4 × 5 km relay	Team sprint
2018	21	49	—	—	—	7	—
2022	25	—	32	27	—	—	—

=== World Championships ===
Year	Age	10 km individual	15 km skiathlon	30 km mass start	Sprint	4 × 5 km relay	Team sprint
2019	22	—	—	—	—	10	—

=== World Cup ===
==== Season standings ====
Season	Age	Discipline standings				Ski Tour standings			
Season	Age	Overall	Distance	Sprint	U23	Nordic Opening	Tour de Ski	Ski Tour 2020	World Cup Final
2018	21	NC	NC	NC	NC	—	DNF	—N/a	—
2019	22	NC	NC	NC	NC	—	—	—N/a	—
2020	23	NC	NC	NC	—N/a	—	DNF	—	—N/a
