= Laurien van der Graaff =

Swiss cross-country skier (born 1987)

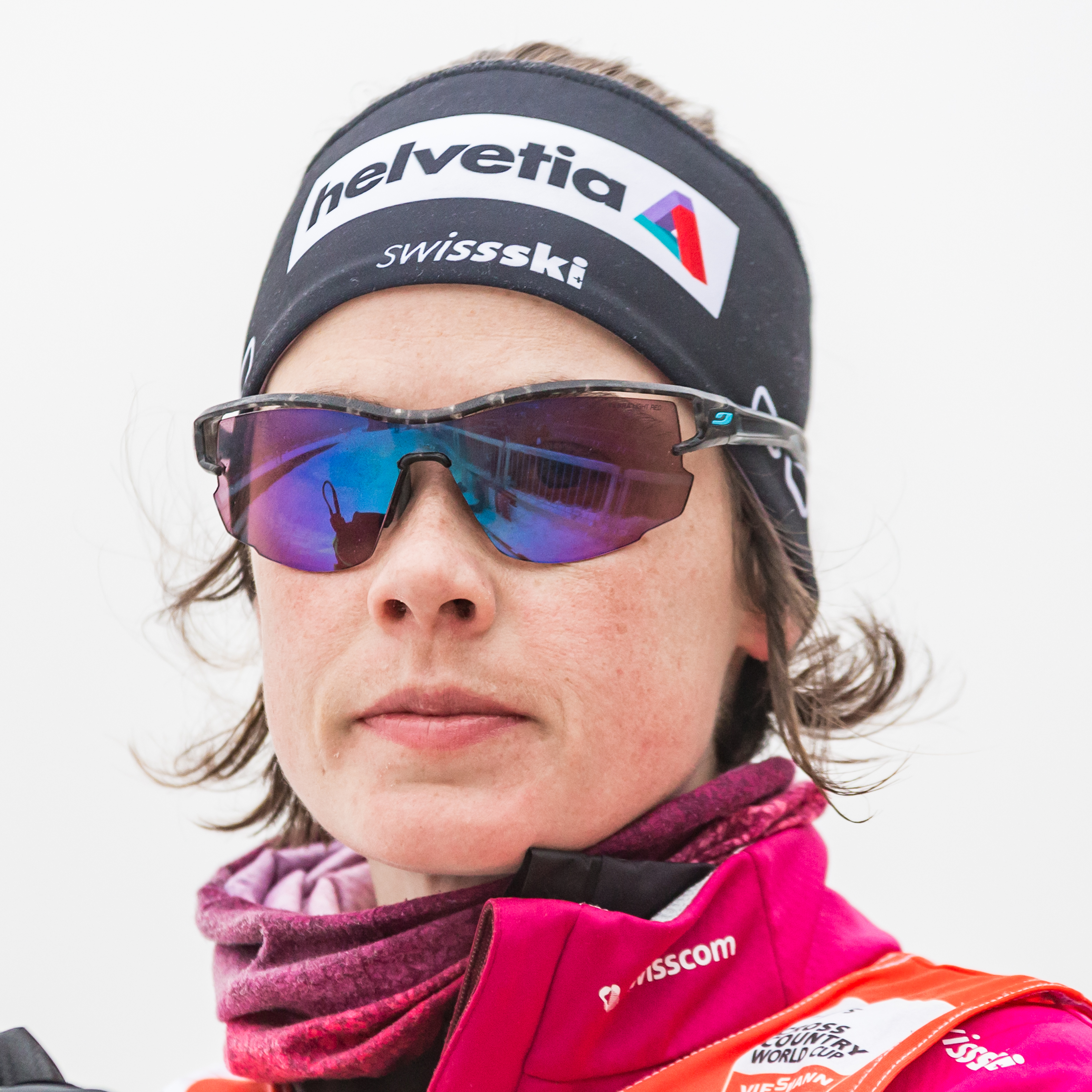

Personal information
- Nationality: Switzerland
- Born: 14 October 1987 (age 38) Nieuwkoop, Netherlands
- Height: 1.67 m (5 ft 6 in)

Sport
- Sport: Skiing
- Club: TG Hütten

World Cup career
- Seasons: 15 – (2008–2022)
- Indiv. starts: 173
- Indiv. podiums: 5
- Indiv. wins: 2
- Team starts: 21
- Team podiums: 4
- Team wins: 1
- Overall titles: 0 – (21st in 2018)
- Discipline titles: 0
Medal record
Women's cross-country skiing
Representing Switzerland
World Championships
Silver medal – second place	2021 Oberstdorf	Team sprint

Laurien van der Graaff (born 14 October 1987) is a Swiss former cross-country skier.

== Career ==
Born in the Netherlands to Dutch parents, she has dual citizenship. Her family moved to Switzerland when she was four. Van der Graaff competed at the 2014 Winter Olympics for Switzerland. She placed 20th in the qualifying round in the sprint, advancing to the quarterfinals. She then finished 5th in that quarterfinal, failing to advance.

As of April 2014, her best showing at the World Championships is 11th, in the freestyle team sprint in 2013. Her best individual finish is 30th, in the 2013 classical sprint.

Van der Graaff made her World Cup debut in March 2008. As of April 2014, she has two podium finishes, with the best a silver medal, in a freestyle sprint race at Nove Mesto in 2013–14. Her best World Cup overall finish is 24th, in 2013–14. Her best World Cup finish in a discipline is 7th, in the sprint in 2013–14.

She announced her retirement from cross-country skiing in March 2022.

== Cross-country skiing results ==
All results are sourced from the International Ski Federation (FIS).

=== Olympic Games ===
Year	Age	10 km individual	15 km skiathlon	30 km mass start	Sprint	4 × 5 km relay	Team sprint
2014	26	—	—	—	21	—	—
2018	30	—	—	—	10	7	4
2022	34	—	—	—	24	7	7

=== World Championships ===
- 1 medal – (1 silver)

Year	Age	10 km individual	15 km skiathlon	30 km mass start	Sprint	4 × 5 km relay	Team sprint
2011	23	—	—	—	40	—	—
2013	25	—	—	—	30	—	11
2015	27	—	—	—	27	—	7
2017	29	—	—	—	30	7	7
2019	31	—	—	—	16	10	8
2021	33	—	—	—	14	—	Silver

=== World Cup ===
==== Season standings ====
Season	Age	Discipline standings			Ski Tour standings				
Season	Age	Overall	Distance	Sprint	Nordic Opening	Tour de Ski	Ski Tour 2020	World Cup Final	Ski Tour Canada
2008	20	NC	—	NC	—N/a	—	—N/a	—	—N/a
2009	21	NC	—	NC	—N/a	—	—N/a	—	—N/a
2010	22	121	—	86	—N/a	—	—N/a	—	—N/a
2011	23	82	—	56	—	—	—N/a	—	—N/a
2012	24	36	NC	14	—	—	—N/a	42	—N/a
2013	25	47	NC	19	—	DNF	—N/a	44	—N/a
2014	26	24	NC	7	DNF	DNF	—N/a	DNF	—N/a
2015	27	38	NC	10	DNF	DNF	—N/a	—N/a	—N/a
2016	28	40	NC	21	DNF	DNF	—N/a	—N/a	DNF
2017	29	34	60	14	DNF	DNF	—N/a	39	—N/a
2018	30	21	71	5	DNF	DNF	—N/a	40	—N/a
2019	31	51	73	25	DNF	DNF	—N/a	DNF	—N/a
2020	32	31	62	13	36	25	DNF	—N/a	—N/a
2021	33	34	91	11	52	35	—N/a	—N/a	—N/a

==== Individual podiums ====
- 2 victories – (1 WC, 1 SWC)
- 5 podiums – (4 WC, 1 SWC)

No.	Season	Date	Location	Race	Level	Place
1	2011–12	3 December 2011	Düsseldorf, Germany	0.9 km Sprint F	World Cup	3rd
2	2013–14	11 January 2014	Nové Město, Czech Republic	1.3 km Sprint F	World Cup	2nd
3	2014–15	24 January 2015	Rybinsk, Russia	1.3 km Sprint F	World Cup	3rd
4	2017–18	30 December 2017	Lenzerheide, Switzerland	1.5 km Sprint F	Stage World Cup	1st
5	2017–18	27 January 2018	Seefeld, Austria	1.1 km Sprint F	World Cup	1st

==== Team podiums ====
- 1 victory – (1 TS)
- 4 podiums – (4 TS)

No.	Season	Date	Location	Race	Level	Place	Teammate
1	2019–20	22 December 2019	Planica, Slovenia	6 × 1.2 km Team Sprint F	World Cup	3rd	Fähndrich
2	2019–20	12 January 2020	Dresden, Germany	12 × 0.65 km Team Sprint F	World Cup	2nd	Fähndrich
3	2020–21	20 December 2020	Dresden, Germany	12 × 0.65 km Team Sprint F	World Cup	1st	Fähndrich
4	2020–21	7 February 2021	Ulricehamn, Sweden	6 × 1.5 km Team Sprint F	World Cup	3rd	Fähndrich
