= Anouk Faivre-Picon =

French cross-country skier (born 1986)

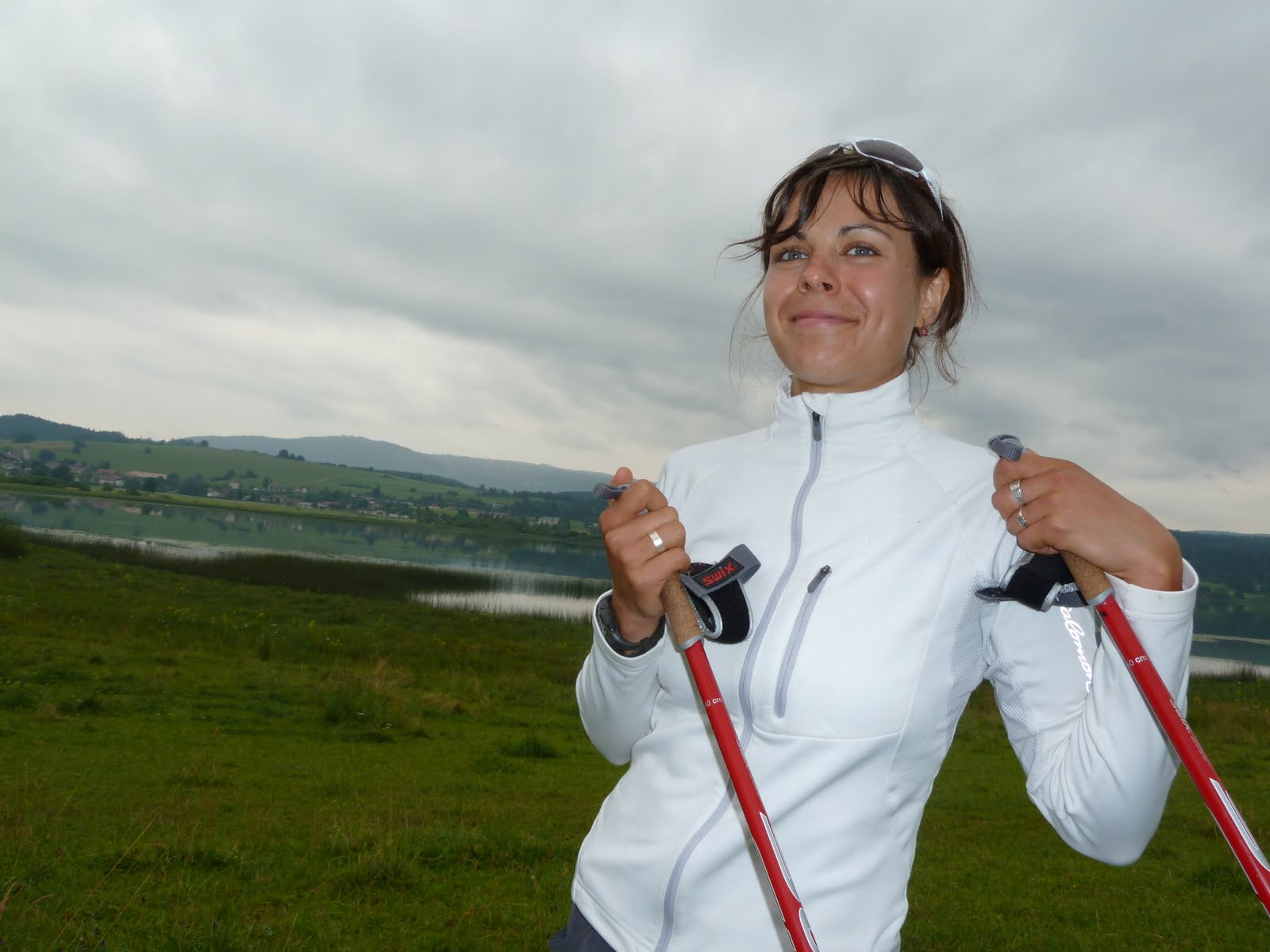
- Faivre-Picon in 2011

Personal information
- Nationality: France
- Born: 18 February 1986 (age 40) Pontarlier, France
- Height: 5 ft 6 in (168 cm)

Sport
- Sport: Skiing
- Club: Defense EMHM Pontarlier

World Cup career
- Seasons: 11 – (2008–2016, 2018–2019)
- Indiv. starts: 116
- Indiv. podiums: 0
- Team starts: 7
- Team podiums: 0
- Overall titles: 0 – (44th in 2014)
- Discipline titles: 0
- Updated on 4 January 2020

Anouk Faivre-Picon (born 18 February 1986) is a French cross-country skier. She competed at the 2014 Winter Olympics in Sochi, in skiathlon and women's classical.

== Cross-country skiing results ==
All results are sourced from the International Ski Federation (FIS).

=== Olympic Games ===
Year	Age	10 km individual	15 km skiathlon	30 km mass start	Sprint	4 × 5 km relay	Team sprint
2014	28	—	37	17	—	4	—
2018	32	35	13	—	—	12	—

=== World Championships ===
Year	Age	10 km individual	15 km skiathlon	30 km mass start	Sprint	4 × 5 km relay	Team sprint
2013	27	18	46	—	—	6	—
2015	29	5	26	—	—	8	—
2019	33	—	20	26	—	8	—

=== World Cup ===
Season Standings
Season	Age	Discipline standings			Ski Tour standings			
Season	Age	Overall	Distance	Sprint	Nordic Opening	Tour de Ski	World Cup Final	Ski Tour Canada
2008	22	NC	NC	NC	—N/a	—	46	—N/a
2009	23	119	85	NC	—N/a	—	40	—N/a
2010	24	93	86	NC	—N/a	—	26	—N/a
2011	25	NC	NC	NC	41	DNF	—	—N/a
2012	26	51	36	NC	49	22	39	—N/a
2013	27	68	48	NC	42	33	—	—N/a
2014	28	44	31	NC	—	23	20	—N/a
2015	29	82	51	NC	56	—	—N/a	—N/a
2016	30	53	35	69	—	29	—N/a	—
2018	32	74	53	NC	—	DNF	—	—N/a
2019	33	49	35	NC	—	18	—	—N/a
