= Sadie Maubet Bjornsen =

American cross-country skier

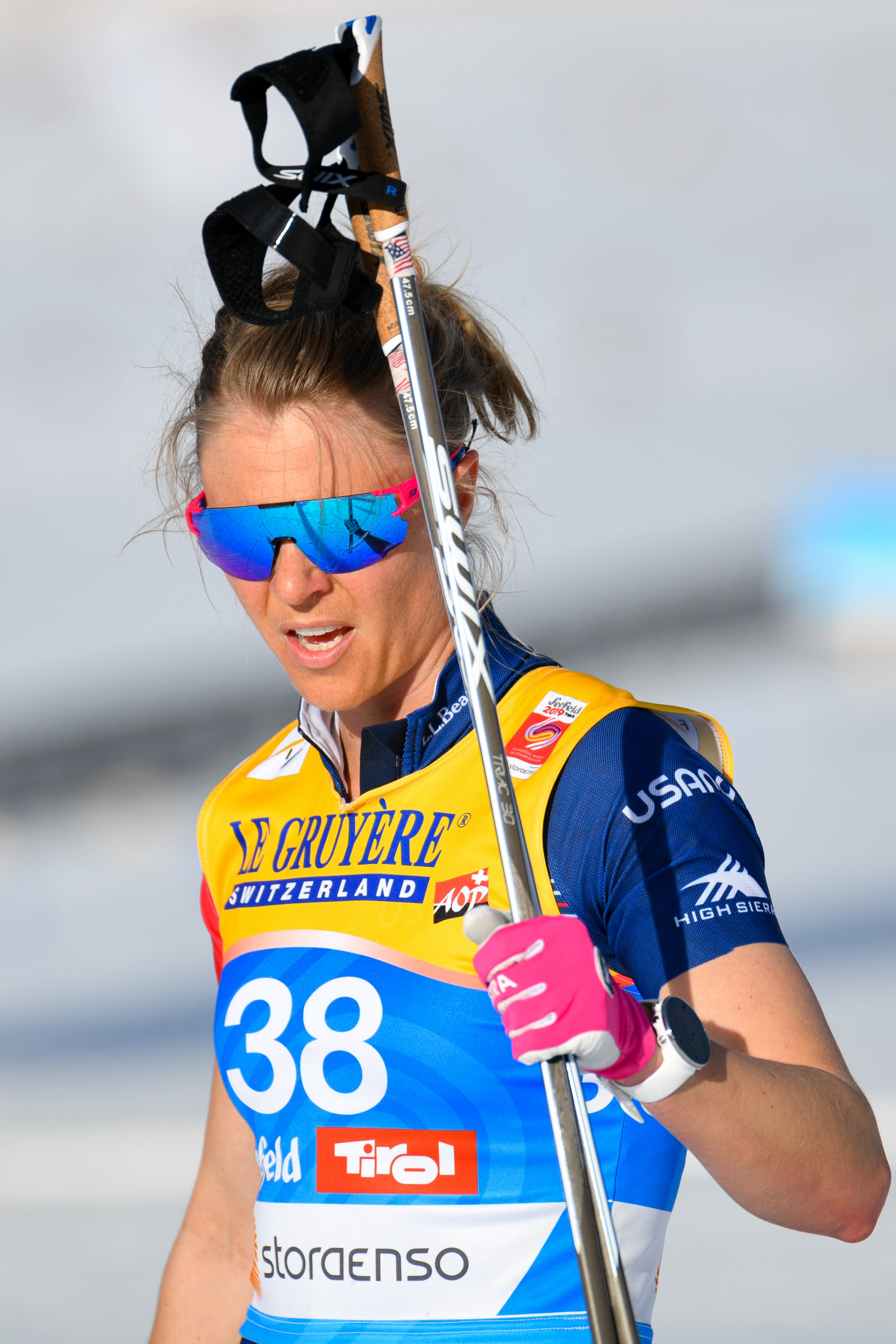
- Maubet Bjornsen in February 2019

Personal information
- Nationality: United States
- Born: November 21, 1989 (age 36) Omak, Washington, U.S.

Sport
- Sport: Skiing
- Club: APU Ski Team

World Cup career
- Seasons: 11– (2011–2021)
- Indiv. starts: 188
- Indiv. podiums: 7
- Indiv. wins: 0
- Team starts: 14
- Team podiums: 5
- Team wins: 0
- Overall titles: 0 – (6th in 2018)
- Discipline titles: 0
Medal record
Women's cross-country skiing
Representing United States
World Championships
Bronze medal – third place	2017 Lahti	Team sprint
- Updated on 2 November 2021

Sadie Maubet Bjornsen (née Bjornsen, born November 21, 1989) is a retired American cross-country skier and former member of the United States Ski Team Nordic programs "Cross Country A Team" roster.

Her brother Erik Bjornsen is also a cross-country skier.

== Athletic career ==
Bjornsen competed at the 2014 Winter Olympics in Sochi, Russia. In 2015, she graduated from Alaska Pacific University.

Bjornsen has one individual world cup podium and four team world cup podiums: Third in the 5 km in Toblach in 2017, third in the 4 × 5 km relay in Lillehammer in 2013 and 2015, second in the 4 × 5 km relay in Nové Město in 2016, and second in the team sprint at Düsseldorf in 2011.

Bjornsen finished ninth overall in the 2017–18 Tour de Ski, behind teammate Jessie Diggins in third: this was the first time that two Americans finished in the top ten in the race's overall classification.

== Cross-country skiing results ==
All results are sourced from the International Ski Federation (FIS).

=== Olympic Games ===
Year	Age	10 km individual	15 km skiathlon	30 km mass start	Sprint	4 × 5 km relay	Team sprint
2014	24	16	30	—	—	9	—
2018	28	15	—	17	14	5	—

=== World Championships ===
- 1 medal – (1 bronze)

Year	Age	10 km individual	15 km skiathlon	30 km mass start	Sprint	4 × 5 km relay	Team sprint
2011	21	29	—	—	28	—	9
2013	23	—	37	—	32	4	—
2015	25	—	20	20	26	4	—
2017	27	23	—	—	—	4	Bronze
2019	29	23	—	15	18	5	5
2021	31	11	—	15	—	4	5

=== World Cup ===
==== Season standings ====
Season	Age	Discipline standings			Ski Tour standings				
Season	Age	Overall	Distance	Sprint	Nordic Opening	Tour de Ski	Ski Tour 2020	World Cup Final	Ski Tour Canada
2011	21	NC	NC	NC	—	—	—N/a	—	—N/a
2012	22	98	NC	69	59	—	—N/a	—	—N/a
2013	23	54	56	37	—	—	—N/a	—	—N/a
2014	24	32	26	43	17	—	—N/a	22	—N/a
2015	25	23	19	24	18	DNF	—N/a	—N/a	—N/a
2016	26	14	14	14	14	14	—N/a	—N/a	11
2017	27	16	17	23	11	DNF	—N/a	10	—N/a
2018	28	6	10	8	10	9	—N/a	3rd place, bronze medalist(s)	—N/a
2019	29	14	13	8	10	DNF	—N/a	11	—N/a
2020	30	8	13	10	4	7	10	—N/a	—N/a
2021	31	54	40	40	—	—	—N/a	—N/a	—N/a

==== Individual podiums ====
- 7 podiums – (2 WC, 5 SWC)

No.	Season	Date	Location	Race	Level	Place
1	2016–17	January 6, 2017	Toblach, Italy	5 km Individual F	Stage World Cup	3rd
2	2017–18	November 24, 2017	Rukatunturi, Finland	1.4 km Sprint C	Stage World Cup	2nd
3	2017–18	December 2, 2017	Lillehammer, Norway	1.3 km Sprint C	World Cup	3rd
4	2017–18	December 31, 2017	Lenzerheide, Switzerland	10 km Individual C	Stage World Cup	3rd
5	2017–18	March 16–18, 2018	(Sweden) World Cup Final	Overall Standings	World Cup	3rd
6	2018–19	November 30, 2018	Lillehammer, Norway	1.3 km Sprint F	Stage World Cup	3rd
7	2019–20	November 29, 2019	Rukatunturi, Finland	1.4 km Sprint C	Stage World Cup	3rd

==== Team podiums ====
- 5 podiums – (1 TS, 4 RL)

No.	Season	Date	Location	Race	Level	Place	Teammate(s)
1	2011–12	December 4, 2011	Düsseldorf, Germany	6 × 0.9 km Team Sprint F	World Cup	2nd	Randall
2	2013–14	December 8, 2013	Lillehammer, Norway	4 × 5 km Relay C/F	World Cup	3rd	Randall / Stephen / Diggins
3	2015-16	December 6, 2015	Lillehammer, Norway	4 × 5 km Relay C/F	World Cup	3rd	Brennan / Stephen / Diggins
4	2015-16	January 24, 2016	Nové Město, Czech Republic	4 × 5 km Relay C/F	World Cup	2nd	Caldwell / Stephen / Diggins
5	2019-20	December 8, 2019	Lillehammer, Norway	4 × 5 km Relay C/F	World Cup	2nd	Caldwell / Brennan / Diggins
