= Elisa Brocard =

Italian cross-country skier (born 1984)

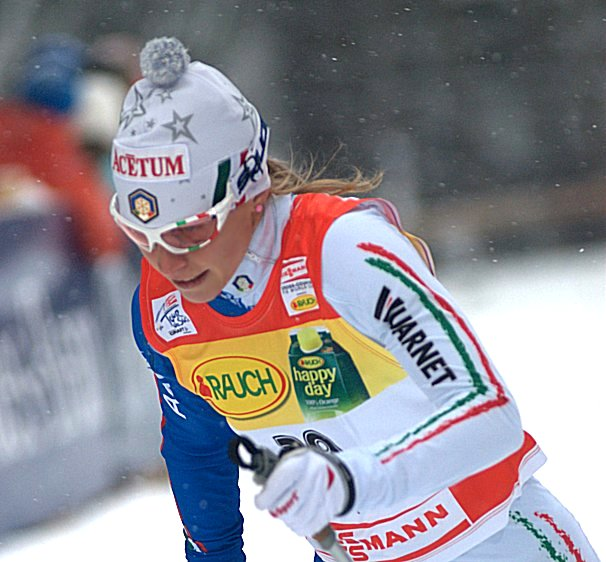
- Elisa Brocard in 2010

Personal information
- Nationality: Italy
- Born: 27 October 1984 (age 41) Aosta, Italy

Sport
- Sport: Skiing
- Club: C.S. Esercito

World Cup career
- Seasons: 16 – (2007–2022)
- Indiv. starts: 162
- Indiv. podiums: 0
- Team starts: 15
- Team podiums: 0
- Overall titles: 0 – (38th in 2018)
- Discipline titles: 0
- Updated on 20 March 2022

Elisa Brocard (born 27 October 1984 in Aosta) is an Italian cross-country skier who has competed since 2001.

== Skiing career ==
At the 2010 Winter Olympics in Vancouver, she finished 43rd in the individual sprint event. At the FIS Nordic World Ski Championships 2009 in Liberec, Brocard finished 32nd in the individual sprint. Her best World Cup finish is sixth in a team sprint event in Germany in 2008, while her best individual finish is 16th in an individual sprint event, also at the same event in Germany.

== Cross-country skiing results ==
All results are sourced from the International Ski Federation (FIS).

=== Olympic Games ===
Year	Age	10 km individual	15 km skiathlon	30 km mass start	Sprint	4 × 5 km relay	Team sprint
2010	25	—	—	—	43	—	—
2014	29	38	31	13	—	7	—
2018	33	29	25	27	—	9	15

=== World Championships ===
Year	Age	10 km individual	15 km skiathlon	30 km mass start	Sprint	4 × 5 km relay	Team sprint
2009	24	—	—	—	32	—	—
2011	26	—	—	—	46	—	—
2017	32	—	30	15	—	9	—
2019	34	—	14	20	10	7	—

=== World Cup ===
==== Season standings ====
Season	Age	Discipline standings			Ski Tour standings				
Season	Age	Overall	Distance	Sprint	Nordic Opening	Tour de Ski	Ski Tour 2020	World Cup Final	Ski Tour Canada
2007	22	NC	NC	—	—N/a	—	—N/a	—N/a	—N/a
2008	23	108	NC	82	—N/a	—	—N/a	35	—N/a
2009	24	68	NC	48	—N/a	—	—N/a	—	—N/a
2010	25	74	78	68	—N/a	27	—N/a	—	—N/a
2011	26	72	70	54	58	DNF	—N/a	—	—N/a
2012	27	44	40	43	63	23	—N/a	25	—N/a
2013	28	119	86	NC	—	—	—N/a	—	—N/a
2014	29	89	60	NC	84	30	—N/a	—	—N/a
2015	30	NC	NC	NC	DNF	—	—N/a	—N/a	—N/a
2016	31	NC	NC	NC	—	—	—N/a	—N/a	—
2017	32	54	48	NC	—	21	—N/a	34	—N/a
2018	33	38	29	74	—	17	—N/a	20	—N/a
2019	34	59	43	51	—	DNF	—N/a	24	—N/a
2020	35	54	50	70	—	37	24	—N/a	—N/a
2021	36	86	87	62	—	DNF	—N/a	—N/a	—N/a
2022	37	83	75	60	—N/a	—	—N/a	—N/a	—N/a
