= FIS Nordic World Ski Championships 2019 – Women's 4 × 5 kilometre relay =

Women's 4 × 5 kilometre relay at the FIS Nordic World Ski Championships 2019
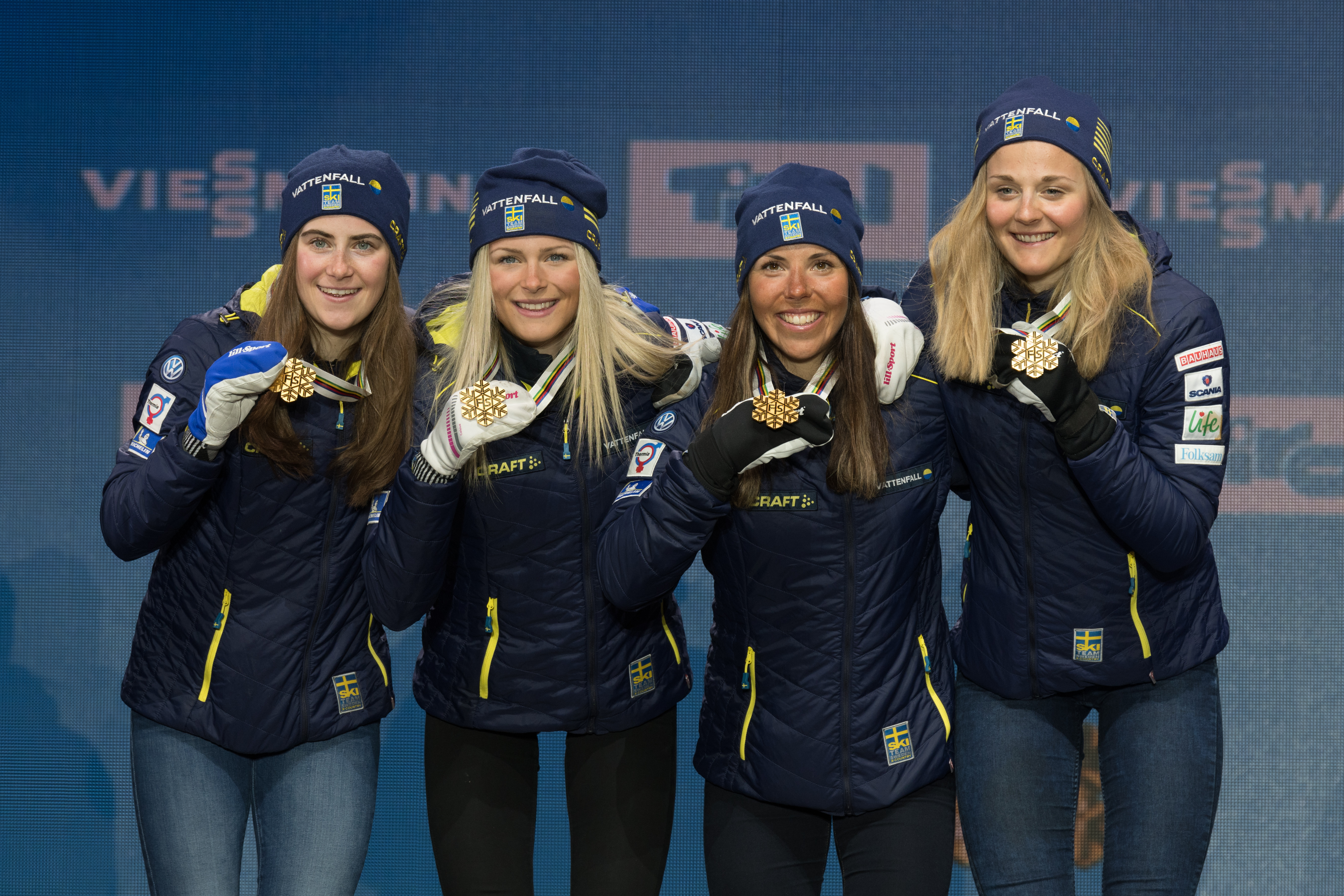
- Team Sweden — gold medalists
- Location: Seefeld in Tirol, Austria
- Dates: 28 February
- Competitors: 68 from 17 nations
- Teams: 17
- Winning time: 55:21.0

Medalists
gold medal	Ebba Andersson; Frida Karlsson; Charlotte Kalla; Stina Nilsson	Sweden
silver medal	Heidi Weng; Ingvild Flugstad Østberg; Astrid Uhrenholdt Jacobsen; Therese Johaug	Norway
bronze medal	Yuliya Belorukova; Anastasia Sedova; Anna Nechaevskaya; Natalya Nepryayeva	Russia

The Women's 4 × 5 kilometre relay competition at the FIS Nordic World Ski Championships 2019 was held on 28 February 2019.

== Results ==
The race was started at 13:00.

Rank	Bib	Country	Athletes	Time	Deficit
1st place, gold medalist(s)	2	Sweden	Ebba Andersson; Frida Karlsson; Charlotte Kalla; Stina Nilsson	55:21.0; 14:43.7; 14:28.7; 13:00.7; 13:07.9	
2nd place, silver medalist(s)	1	Norway	Heidi Weng; Ingvild Flugstad Østberg; Astrid Uhrenholdt Jacobsen; Therese Johaug	55:24.1; 14:44.1; 14:26.9; 13:20.9; 12:52.2	+3.1
3rd place, bronze medalist(s)	3	Russia	Yuliya Belorukova; Anastasia Sedova; Anna Nechaevskaya; Natalya Nepryayeva	57:24.8; 14:43.5; 14:39.5; 14:09.3; 13:52.5	+2:03.8
4	6	Germany	Victoria Carl; Katharina Hennig; Sandra Ringwald; Laura Gimmler	58:07.3; 14:51.1; 14:31.1; 14:12.1; 14:33.0	+2:46.3
5	5	United States	Julia Kern; Sadie Bjornsen; Rosie Brennan; Jessie Diggins	58:27.0; 15:27.7; 15:02.7; 13:46.6; 14:10.0	+3:06.0
6	4	Finland	Laura Mononen; Krista Pärmäkoski; Riitta-Liisa Roponen; Eveliina Piippo	59:08.7; 15:02.3; 14:53.7; 14:07.7; 15:05.0	+3:47.7
7	9	Italy	Anna Comarella; Lucia Scardoni; Elisa Brocard; Ilaria Debertolis	59:15.9; 14:54.5; 15:50.1; 13:59.3; 14:32.0	+3:54.9
8	12	France	Anouk Faivre-Picon; Laura Chamiot-Maitral; Delphine Claudel; Flora Dolci	59:21.9; 15:13.2; 15:21.3; 14:18.7; 14:28.7	+4:00.9
9	8	Slovenia	Katja Višnar; Anamarija Lampič; Alenka Čebašek; Eva Urevc	59:42.2; 15:52.6; 15:08.1; 14:08.1; 14:33.4	+4:21.2
10	7	Switzerland	Laurien van der Graaff; Nadine Fähndrich; Lydia Hiernickel; Nathalie von Siebenthal	59:51.9; 16:18.7; 14:47.6; 14:46.8; 13:58.8	+4:30.9
11	11	Czech Republic	Kateřina Razýmová; Petra Hynčicová; Petra Nováková; Sandra Schützová	1:00:14.0; 15:20.5; 15:36.5; 14:28.9; 14:48.1	+4:53.0
12	13	Canada	Katherine Stewart-Jones; Emily Nishikawa; Cendrine Browne; Dahria Beatty	1:00:23.7; 15:16.8; 15:26.3; 15:15.0; 14:25.6	+5:02.7
13	10	Poland	Monika Skinder; Justyna Kowalczyk; Izabela Marcisz; Urszula Łętocha	1:00:25.7; 16:47.7; 14:47.6; 13:54.5; 14:55.9	+5:04.7
14	14	Japan	Masako Ishida; Kozue Takizawa; Miki Kodama; Sumiko Ishigaki	1:01:24.0; 14:54.9; 16:02.7; 15:00.2; 15:26.2	+6:03.0
15	15	Kazakhstan	Anna Shevchenko; Irina Bykova; Marina Matrossova; Valeriya Tyuleneva	1:02:12.4; 15:43.1; 16:10.7; 15:29.5; 14:49.1	+6:51.4
16	17	China	Chi Chunxue; Ma Qinghua; Meng Honglian; Li Xin	LAP; 15:46.0; 17:04.5; 26:46.9	
17	16	Ukraine	Yuliya Krol; Tetyana Antypenko; Valiantsina Kaminskaya; Viktoriya Olekh	LAP; 16:53.8; 16:34.8	
