= Mattia Pellegrin =

Italian cross-country skier

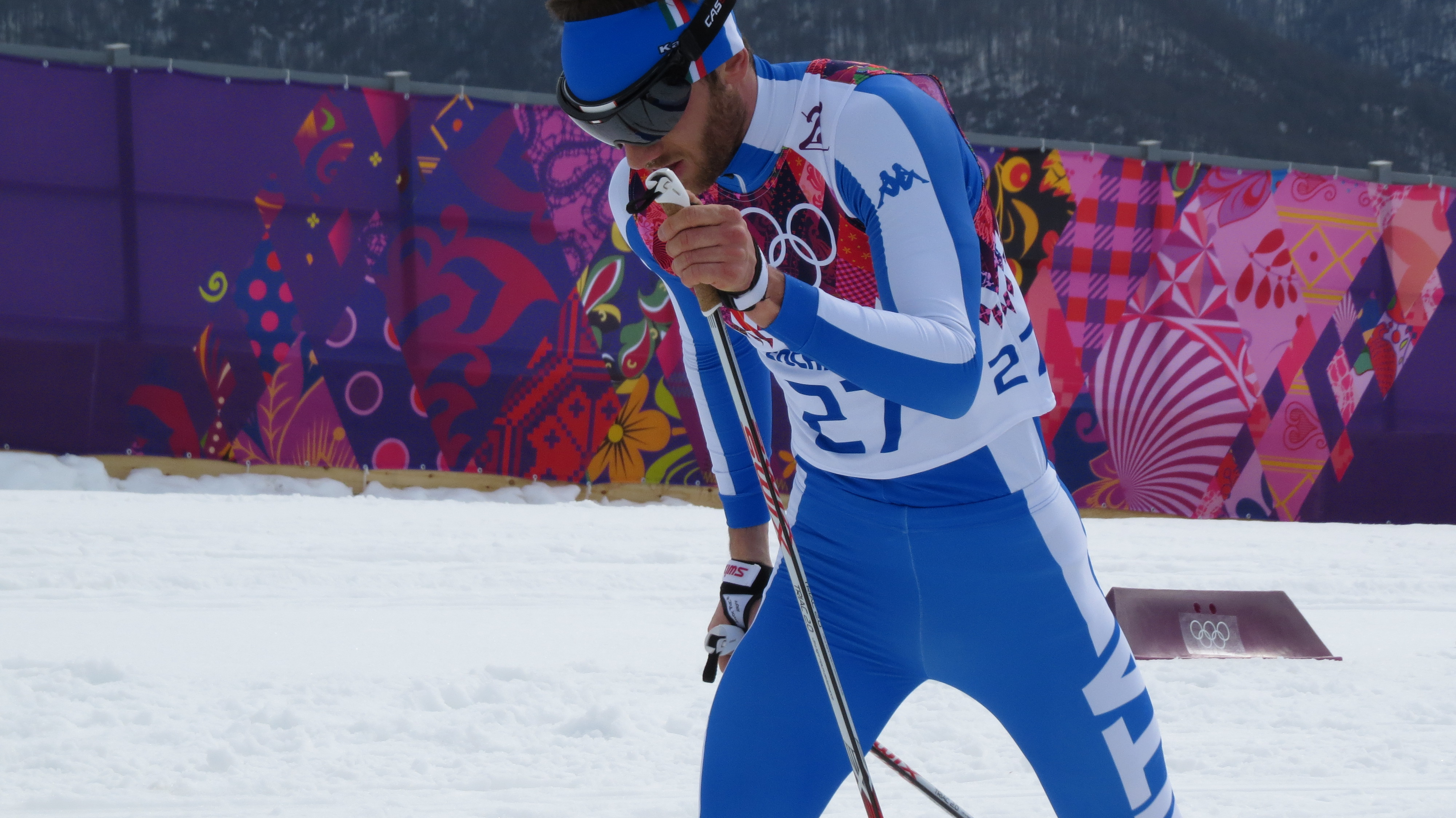

Personal information
- Born: 8 June 1989 (age 37)
- Height: 1.80 m (5 ft 11 in) (5' 11'')
- Weight: 71 kg / 157 lb

Sport
- Club: Fiamme Oro
Medal record
Cross-country skiing
Representing Italy

Mattia Pellegrin (born 8 June 1989) is a former cross-country skier from Italy. He competed for Italy at the 2014 Winter Olympics in the cross country skiing events. He has been in a relationship with cross-country skier Lucia Scardoni since 2011: the couple have lived together in Predazzo since 2013. As of 2018, he had retired from competition and was working as a policeman.
