= Lucia Scardoni =

Italian cross-country skier

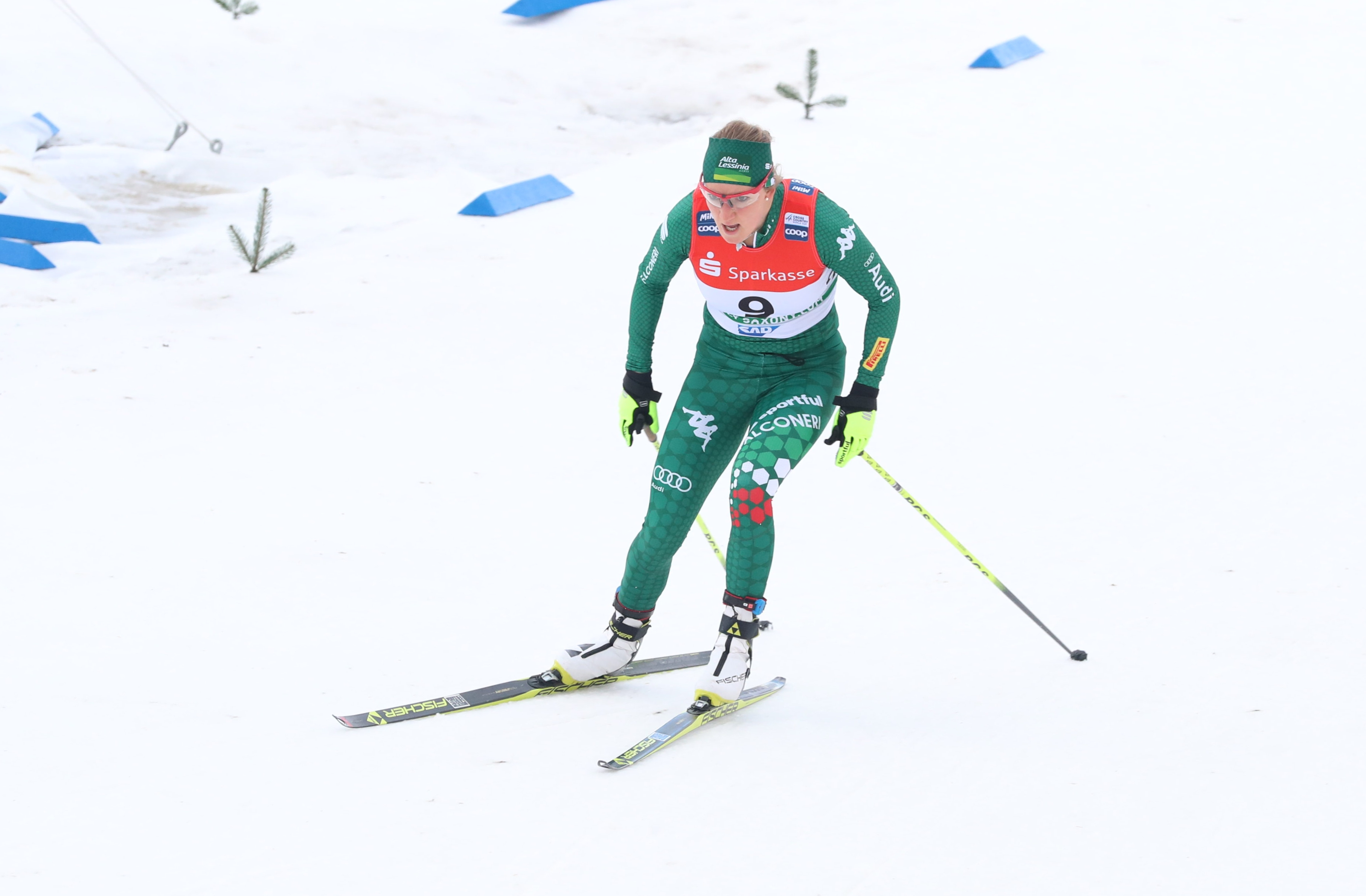
- Lucia Scardoni in Dresden, 2019

Personal information
- Nationality: Italy
- Born: 22 March 1991 (age 35) Verona, Italy

Sport
- Sport: Skiing
- Club: G.S. Fiamme Gialle

World Cup career
- Seasons: 11 – (2012–2022)
- Indiv. starts: 126
- Indiv. podiums: 0
- Team starts: 14
- Team podiums: 0
- Overall titles: 0 – (30th in 2021)
- Discipline titles: 0
- Updated on 15 March 2022

Lucia Scardoni (born 22 March 1991) is an Italian cross-country skier. She competed in the women's sprint at the 2018 Winter Olympics. and Women's 10 kilometre classical, at the 2022 Winter Olympics.

== Biography ==
Scardoni grew up in Valdiporro, near Bosco Chiesanuova, the daughter of Roberta, a schoolteacher, and Ivo, a painter and decorator. She followed in the footsteps of her father, who was a keen cross-country skier who competed in long-distance races, including Marcialonga and Vasaloppet. She has been in a relationship with cross-country skier Mattia Pellegrin since 2011: the couple have lived together in Predazzo since 2013.

== Cross-country skiing results ==
All results are sourced from the International Ski Federation (FIS).

=== Olympic Games ===
Year	Age	10 km individual	15 km skiathlon	30 km mass start	Sprint	4 × 5 km relay	Team sprint
2018	27	39	—	41	24	9	—
2022	31	38	—	—	29	8	13

=== World Championships ===
Year	Age	10 km individual	15 km skiathlon	30 km mass start	Sprint	4 × 5 km relay	Team sprint
2017	26	33	—	—	—	9	10
2019	28	34	—	—	25	7	11
2021	30	48	—	—	15	—	11

=== World Cup ===
==== Season standings ====
Season	Age	Discipline standings			Ski Tour standings				
Season	Age	Overall	Distance	Sprint	Nordic Opening	Tour de Ski	Ski Tour 2020	World Cup Final	Ski Tour Canada
2012	21	NC	NC	—	—	—	—N/a	—	—N/a
2013	22	NC	NC	—	—	—	—N/a	—	—N/a
2014	23	NC	NC	NC	69	DNF	—N/a	—	—N/a
2015	24	NC	NC	NC	—	—	—N/a	—N/a	—N/a
2016	25	65	79	47	27	35	—N/a	—N/a	—
2017	26	92	82	63	55	DNF	—N/a	—	—N/a
2018	27	59	NC	28	—	DNF	—N/a	—	—N/a
2019	28	56	65	33	—	—	—N/a	35	—N/a
2020	29	52	NC	29	41	DNF	DNF	—N/a	—N/a
2021	30	30	46	12	27	31	—N/a	—N/a	—N/a
