= Ilaria Debertolis =

Italian cross-country skier

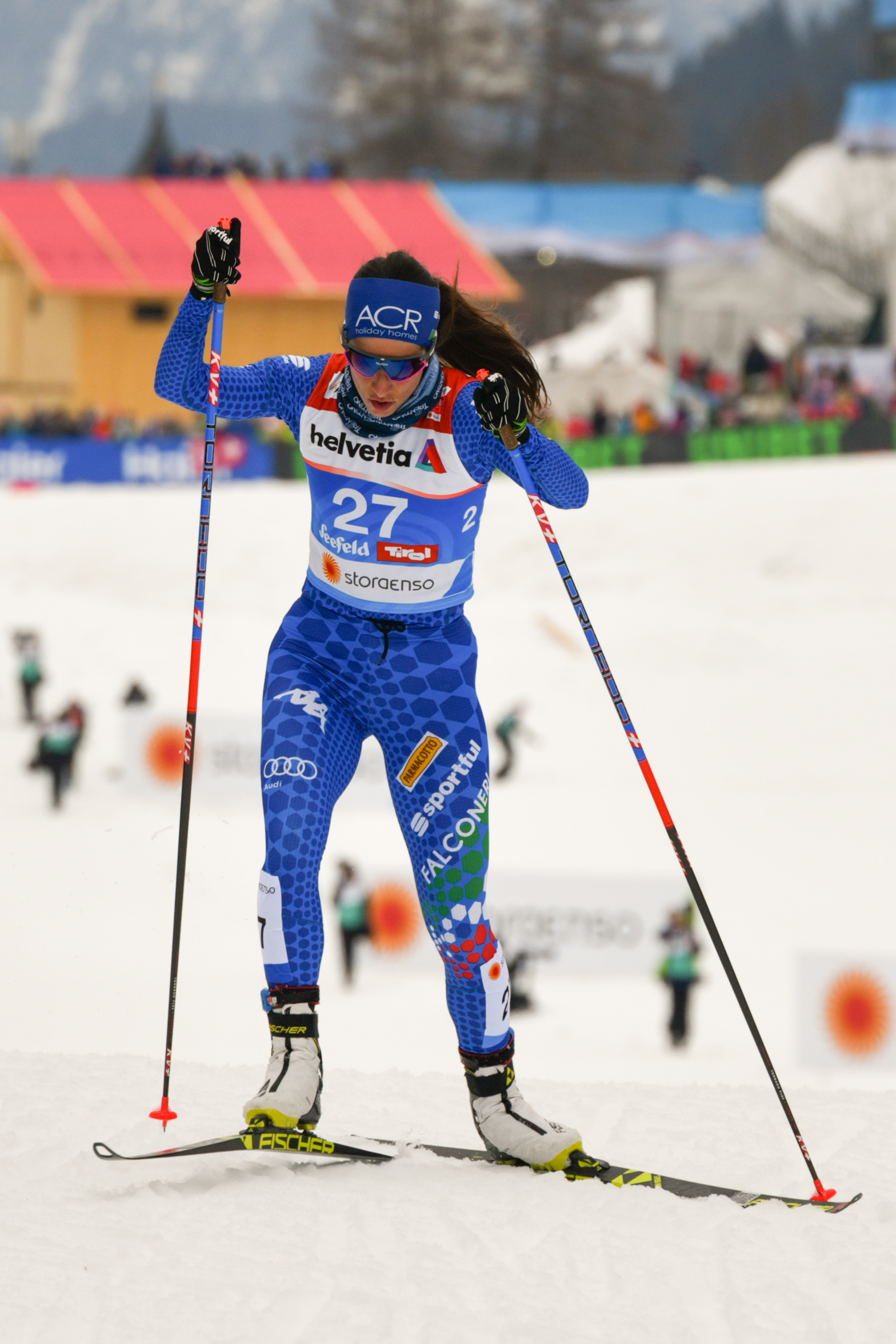

Personal information
- Nationality: Italy
- Born: 17 September 1989 (age 36) Feltre, Italy
- Height: 1.69 m (5 ft 7 in)

Sport
- Sport: Skiing
- Club: G.S. Fiamme Oro

World Cup career
- Seasons: 10 – (2012–2021)
- Indiv. starts: 128
- Indiv. podiums: 0
- Team starts: 12
- Team podiums: 0
- Overall titles: 0 – (54th in 2014)
- Discipline titles: 0
- Updated on 4 November 2021

Ilaria Debertolis (born 17 September 1989 in Feltre) is an Italian cross-country skier. She competed at the FIS Nordic World Ski Championships 2013 in Val di Fiemme. She competed at the 2014 Winter Olympics in Sochi, in 30 kilometre freestyle, and was part of the Italian team that placed eighth in the relay. She has been in a relationship with fellow cross-country skier Dietmar Nöckler since 2009.

== Cross-country skiing results ==
All results are sourced from the International Ski Federation (FIS).

=== Olympic Games ===
Year	Age	10 km individual	15 km skiathlon	30 km mass start	Sprint	4 × 5 km relay	Team sprint
2014	24	—	—	42	31	7	12
2018	28	31	49	—	—	9	—

=== World Championships ===
Year	Age	10 km individual	15 km skiathlon	30 km mass start	Sprint	4 × 5 km relay	Team sprint
2013	23	39	—	—	55	—	5
2015	25	21	—	—	—	9	11
2017	27	—	31	16	19	9	10
2019	29	—	—	38	58	7	—
2021	31	32	—	—	—	—	—

=== World Cup ===
==== Season standings ====
Season	Age	Discipline standings			Ski Tour standings				
Season	Age	Overall	Distance	Sprint	Nordic Opening	Tour de Ski	Ski Tour 2020	World Cup Final	Ski Tour Canada
2012	22	NC	NC	NC	—	DNF	—N/a	—	—N/a
2013	23	102	NC	65	—	DNF	—N/a	—	—N/a
2014	24	92	69	75	57	28	—N/a	—	—N/a
2015	25	54	53	52	53	19	—N/a	—N/a	—N/a
2016	26	75	62	53	45	DNF	—N/a	—N/a	—
2017	27	29	26	28	29	19	—N/a	31	—N/a
2018	28	NC	NC	NC	49	—	—N/a	—	—N/a
2019	29	94	NC	62	—	DNF	—N/a	—	—N/a
2020	30	92	73	79	—	DNF	34	—N/a	—N/a
2021	31	95	72	86	—	41	—N/a	—N/a	—N/a
