= Valentin Chauvin =

French cross-country skier (born 1995)

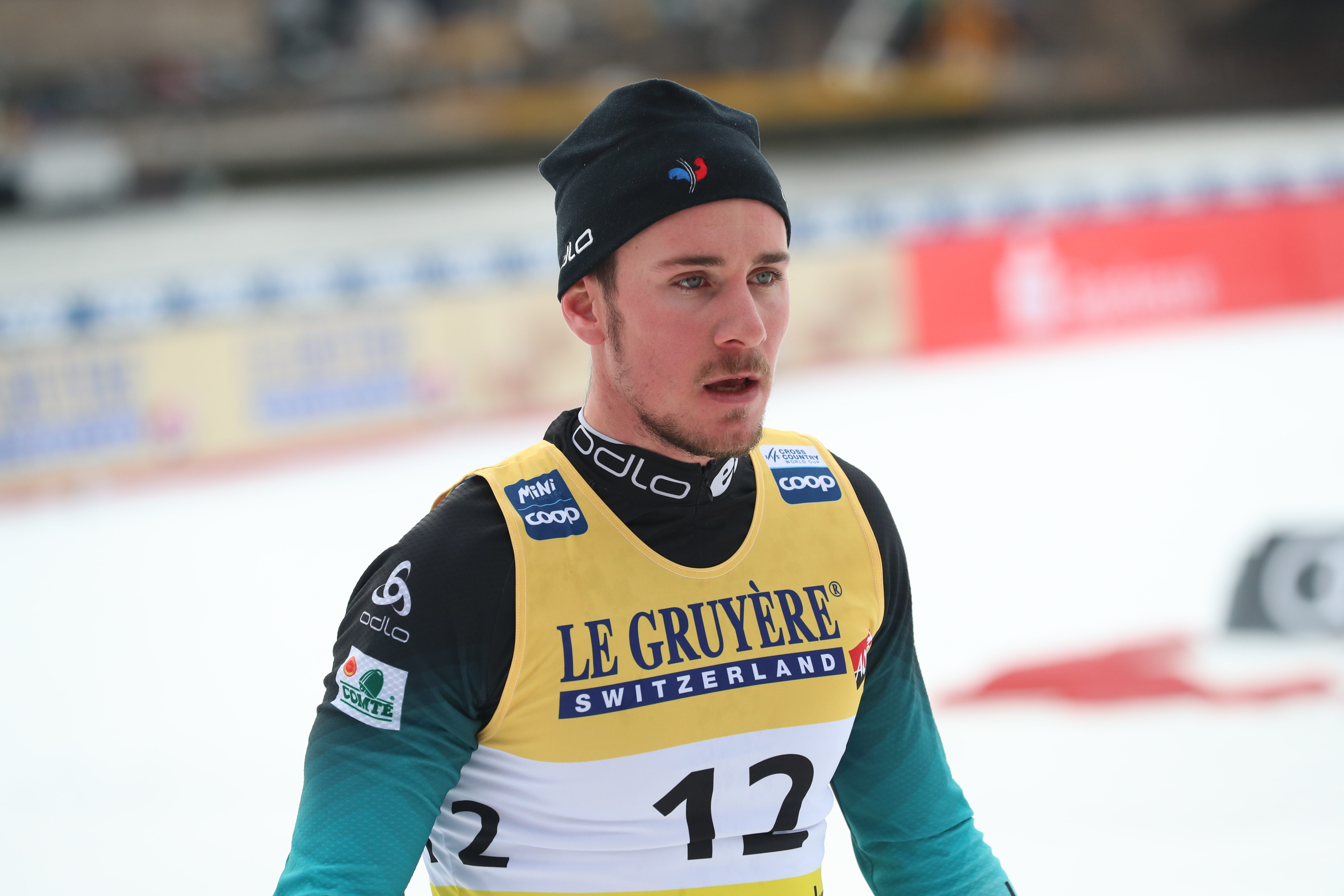
- Chauvin in 2019

Personal information
- Nationality: France
- Born: 30 December 1995 (age 30)

Sport
- Sport: Skiing
- Club: Haut-Jura Ski

World Cup career
- Seasons: 5 – (2016–2021)
- Indiv. starts: 50
- Indiv. podiums: 0
- Team podiums: 1
- Overall titles: 0 – (42nd in 2021)
- Discipline titles: 0
Medal record
Men's cross-country skiing
Representing France
Junior World Championships
Silver medal – second place	2014 Val di Fiemme	4 × 5 km relay
Silver medal – second place	2015 Almaty	4 × 5 km relay
- Updated on 5 December 2023

Valentin Chauvin (born 30 December 1995) is a French cross-country skier, who last competed in 2021. He had one team podium in the 2015–16 FIS Cross-Country World Cup and won the 2018–19 FIS Cross-Country Alpen Cup.

== Cross-country skiing results ==
All results are sourced from the International Ski Federation (FIS).

=== World Championships ===
Year	Age	15 km individual	30 km skiathlon	50 km mass start	Sprint	4 × 10 km relay	Team sprint
2019	23	37	—	—	—	—	—
2021	25	—	—	—	25	—	—

=== World Cup ===
==== Season standings ====
Season	Age	Discipline standings				Ski Tour standings			
Season	Age	Overall	Distance	Sprint	U23	Nordic Opening	Tour de Ski	Ski Tour 2020	World Cup Final
2016	19	140	—	92	17	—	—N/a	—	—N/a
2017	20	—	—	—	—	—	—	—	—N/a
2018	21	143	—	83	25	—	—N/a	—	—N/a
2019	22	101	72	78	—N/a	—	—	—N/a	—N/a
2020	23	62	81	27	—N/a	—	—	—N/a	—N/a
2021	24	42	—	10	—N/a	—N/a	43	—N/a	—N/a

==== Team podiums ====
- 1 podiums – (1 TS)

No.	Season	Date	Location	Race	Level	Place	Teammate
1	2015–16	17 January 2016	Planica, Slovenia	6 × 1.2 km Team Sprint F	World Cup	3rd	Jouve
