= FIS Nordic World Ski Championships 2017 – Women's team sprint =

Women's team sprint at the FIS Nordic World Ski Championships 2017
- Location: Lahti, Finland
- Date: 26 February
- Competitors: 34 from 17 nations
- Teams: 17
- Winning time: 20:20.5

Medalists
gold medal	Heidi Weng; Maiken Caspersen Falla	Norway
silver medal	Yuliya Belorukova; Natalya Matveyeva	Russia
bronze medal	Sadie Bjornsen; Jessie Diggins	United States

The Women's team sprint event of the FIS Nordic World Ski Championships 2017 was held on 26 February 2017.

== Results ==
=== Semifinals ===
The semifinals were started at 11:30.

Semifinal A

Rank	Heat	Bib	Country	Athletes	Time	Deficit	Note
1	A	1	Norway	Heidi Weng; Maiken Caspersen Falla	20:10.7	—	Q
2	A	3	Finland	Aino-Kaisa Saarinen; Kerttu Niskanen	20:13.8	+3.1	Q
3	A	2	Switzerland	Nadine Fähndrich; Laurien van der Graaff	20:23.6	+12.9	q
4	A	5	Italy	Ilaria Debertolis; Lucia Scardoni	20:34.5	+23.8	q
5	A	4	Slovenia	Katja Višnar; Anamarija Lampič	20:43.4	+32.7	q
6	A	7	Czech Republic	Karolína Grohová; Sandra Schützová	21:26.3	+1:15.6	out
7	A	6	Canada	Cendrine Browne; Dahria Beatty	21:35.6	+1:24.9	out
8	A	8	Ukraine	Tetyana Antypenko; Yuliya Krol	22:04.4	+1:53.7	out
9	A	9	Australia	Jessica Yeaton; Katerina Paul	23:11.9	+3:01.2	out

Semifinal B

Rank	Heat	Bib	Country	Athletes	Time	Deficit	Note
1	B	11	Sweden	Ida Ingemarsdotter; Stina Nilsson	20:29.2	—	Q
2	B	12	Germany	Stefanie Böhler; Nicole Fessel	20:29.6	+0.4	Q
3	B	10	United States	Sadie Bjornsen; Jessie Diggins	20:30.6	+1.4	q
4	B	13	Russia	Yuliya Belorukova; Natalya Matveyeva	20:33.6	+4.4	q
5	B	14	Poland	Ewelina Marcisz; Justyna Kowalczyk	21:00.2	+31.0	q
6	B	15	Belarus	Polina Seronosova; Yulia Tikhonova	21:06.8	+37.6	out
7	B	17	Kazakhstan	Anna Stoyan; Anna Shevchenko	21:39.3	+ 1:10.1	out
8	B	16	Austria	Lisa Unterweger; Anna Roswitha Seebacher	22:07.7	+ 1:38.5	out

=== Final ===
The final was started at 13:30.

Rank	Bib	Country	Athletes	Time	Deficit
1st place, gold medalist(s)	1	Norway	Heidi Weng; Maiken Caspersen Falla	20:20.5	—
2nd place, silver medalist(s)	13	Russia	Yuliya Belorukova; Natalya Matveyeva	20:26.1	+5.6
3rd place, bronze medalist(s)	10	United States	Sadie Bjornsen; Jessie Diggins	20:38.9	+18.4
4	11	Sweden	Ida Ingemarsdotter; Stina Nilsson	20:39.1	+18.6
5	3	Finland	Aino-Kaisa Saarinen; Kerttu Niskanen	20:43.5	+23.0
6	12	Germany	Stefanie Böhler; Nicole Fessel	20:50.0	+29.5
7	2	Switzerland	Nadine Fähndrich; Laurien van der Graaff	21:02.4	+41.9
8	4	Slovenia	Katja Višnar; Anamarija Lampič	21:09.0	+48.5
9	14	Poland	Ewelina Marcisz; Justyna Kowalczyk	21:09.5	+49.0
10	5	Italy	Ilaria Debertolis; Lucia Scardoni	21:25.7	+1:05.2
