= Antonia Fräbel =

German cross-country skier

Antonia Horn
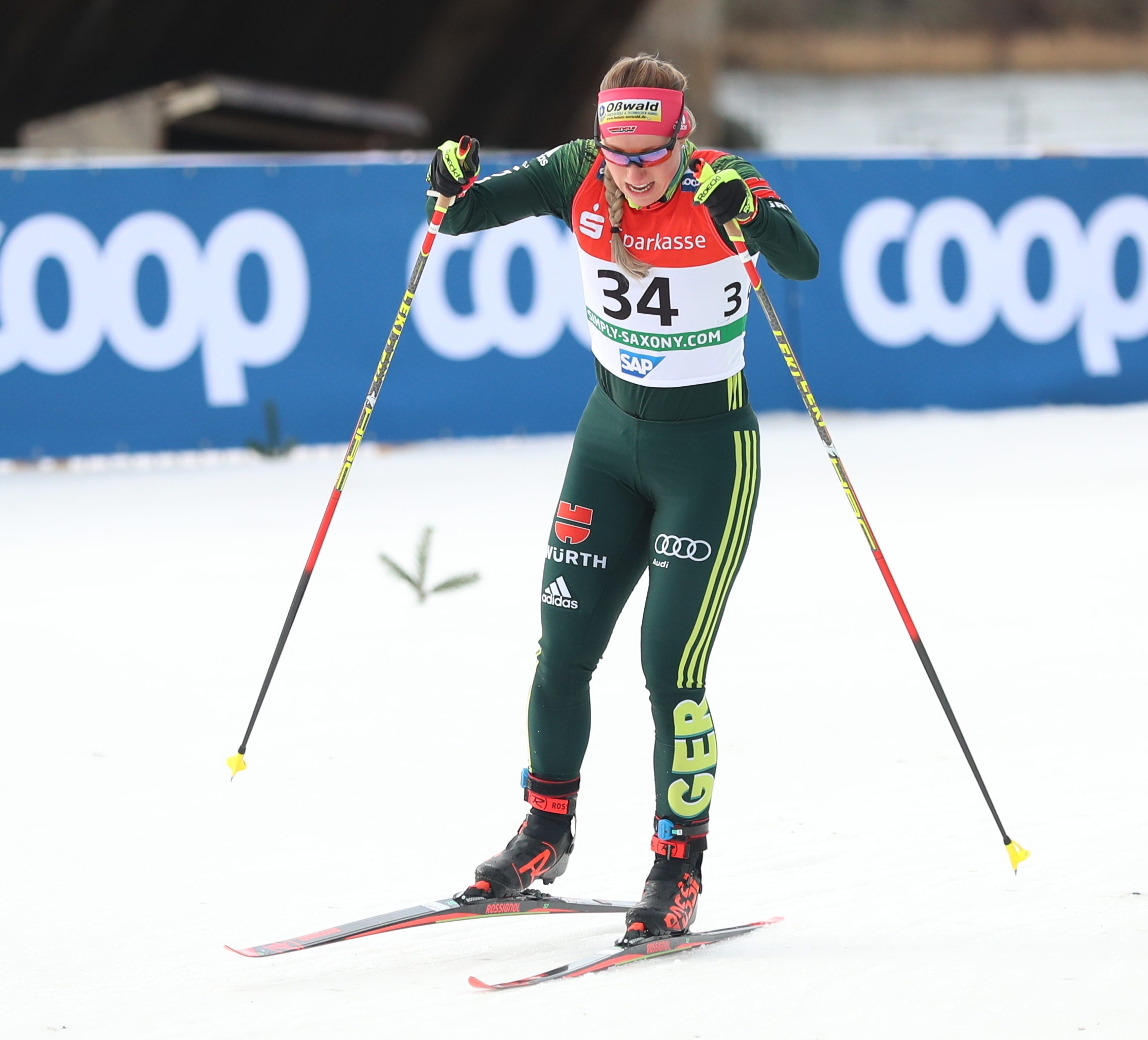
- Fräbel in 2019

Personal information
- Nationality: Germany
- Born: Antonia Fräbel; 25 January 1997 (age 29) Schmalkalden, Germany
- Height: 1.60 m (5 ft 3 in)
- Spouse: Philipp Horn (m. 2022)

Sport
- Sport: Skiing
- Club: WSV Asbach

World Cup career
- Seasons: 6 – (2017–2022)
- Indiv. starts: 56
- Indiv. podiums: 0
- Team starts: 5
- Team podiums: 0
- Overall titles: 0 – (56th in 2021)
- Discipline titles: 0
Medal record
Women's cross-country skiing
Representing Germany
Junior World Championships
Silver medal – second place	2017 Park City	Individual sprint
Bronze medal – third place	2016 Râșnov	5 km classical
- Updated on 19 March 2022

Antonia Horn (née Fräbel; born 25 January 1997) is a German cross-country skier. In May 2022, she married biathlete Philipp Horn and has used his surname since then.

She participated in the pursuit event at the FIS Nordic World Ski Championships 2021.

== Cross-country skiing results ==
All results are sourced from the International Ski Federation (FIS).

=== Olympic Games ===
Year	Age	10 km individual	15 km skiathlon	30 km mass start	Sprint	4 × 5 km relay	Team sprint
2022	25	28	—	19	—	—	—

=== World Championships ===
Year	Age	10 km individual	15 km skiathlon	30 km mass start	Sprint	4 × 5 km relay	Team sprint
2021	24	46	36	—	—	—	—

=== World Cup ===
==== Season standings ====
Season	Age	Discipline standings				Ski Tour standings			
Season	Age	Overall	Distance	Sprint	U23	Nordic Opening	Tour de Ski	Ski Tour 2020	World Cup Final
2017	20	NC	NC	NC	NC	—	DNF	—N/a	—
2018	21	NC	NC	NC	NC	—	—	—N/a	—
2019	22	108	81	NC	27	DNF	—	—N/a	—
2020	23	83	88	68	21	46	36	—	—N/a
2021	24	56	44	63	—N/a	—	26	—N/a	—N/a
2022	25	61	34	NC	—N/a	—N/a	32	—N/a	—N/a
