= FIS Nordic World Ski Championships 2019 – Women's sprint =

Women's sprint at the FIS Nordic World Ski Championships 2019
- Location: Seefeld in Tirol, Austria
- Dates: 21 February
- Competitors: 110 from 41 nations
- Winning time: 2:32.35

Medalists
gold medal	Maiken Caspersen Falla	Norway
silver medal	Stina Nilsson	Sweden
bronze medal	Mari Eide	Norway

The Women's sprint competition at the FIS Nordic World Ski Championships 2019 was held on 21 February 2019.

== Results ==
=== Qualification ===
The qualification was held at 12:00.

Rank	Bib	Athlete	Country	Time	Deficit	Notes
1	22	Maja Dahlqvist	Sweden	2:29.44		Q
2	14	Nadine Fähndrich	Switzerland	2:30.48	+1.04	Q
3	20	Hanna Falk	Sweden	2:30.75	+1.31	Q
4	21	Sophie Caldwell	United States	2:31.14	+1.70	Q
5	10	Eva Urevc	Slovenia	2:31.39	+1.95	Q
6	7	Maiken Caspersen Falla	Norway	2:31.46	+2.02	Q
7	2	Anamarija Lampič	Slovenia	2:31.58	+2.14	Q
8	4	Katja Višnar	Slovenia	2:31.80	+2.36	Q
9	6	Natalya Nepryayeva	Russia	2:32.64	+3.20	Q
10	3	Greta Laurent	Italy	2:33.08	+3.64	Q
11	9	Tiril Udnes Weng	Norway	2:33.17	+3.73	Q
12	16	Stina Nilsson	Sweden	2:33.20	+3.76	Q
13	24	Kristine Stavås Skistad	Norway	2:33.42	+3.98	Q
14	13	Sadie Bjornsen	United States	2:33.82	+4.38	Q
15	23	Jessie Diggins	United States	2:34.05	+4.61	Q
16	8	Alenka Čebašek	Slovenia	2:34.25	+4.81	Q
17	12	Sandra Ringwald	Germany	2:34.38	+4.94	Q
18	17	Yuliya Belorukova	Russia	2:34.42	+4.98	Q
19	5	Laura Gimmler	Germany	2:34.78	+5.34	Q
20	15	Jonna Sundling	Sweden	2:34.83	+5.39	Q
21	19	Laurien van der Graaff	Switzerland	2:34.85	+5.41	Q
22	28	Julia Kern	United States	2:35.76	+6.32	Q
23	1	Natalya Matveyeva	Russia	2:35.98	+6.54	Q
24	27	Elisa Brocard	Italy	2:36.07	+6.63	Q
25	11	Mari Eide	Norway	2:36.22	+6.78	Q
26	25	Victoria Carl	Germany	2:36.40	+6.96	Q
27	32	Sofie Krehl	Germany	2:36.54	+7.10	Q
28	35	Tereza Beranová	Czech Republic	2:36.65	+7.21	Q
29	31	Lucia Scardoni	Italy	2:37.20	+7.76	Q
30	51	Mariel Merlii Pulles	Estonia	2:37.46	+8.02	Q
31	36	Dahria Beatty	Canada	2:37.49	+8.05	
32	18	Lotta Udnes Weng	Norway	2:37.60	+8.16	
33	39	Anne Kyllönen	Finland	2:38.11	+8.67	
34	26	Yelena Soboleva	Russia	2:38.31	+8.87	
35	29	Delphine Claudel	France	2:38.35	+8.91	
36	59	Patrīcija Eiduka	Latvia	2:38.81	+9.37	
37	44	Petra Nováková	Czech Republic	2:39.08	+9.64	
38	54	Jessica Yeaton	Australia	2:39.10	+9.66	
39	52	Li Xin	China	2:39.33	+9.89	
40	53	Katherine Stewart-Jones	Canada	2:39.39	+9.95	
41	33	Kateřina Janatová	Czech Republic	2:39.50	+10.06	
42	37	Anastasia Kirillova	Belarus	2:39.52	+10.08	
43	43	Petra Hynčicová	Czech Republic	2:40.06	+10.62	
44	40	Lisa Unterweger	Austria	2:40.23	+10.79	
45	30	Katri Lylynperä	Finland	2:40.50	+11.06	
46	56	Weronika Kaleta	Poland	2:40.56	+11.12	
47	50	Urszula Łętocha	Poland	2:40.62	+11.18	
48	46	Polina Seronosova	Belarus	2:40.65	+11.21	
49	55	Ma Qinghua	China	2:40.80	+11.36	
50	58	Chi Chunxue	China	2:41.26	+11.82	
51	45	Anita Korva	Finland	2:41.38	+11.94	
52	47	Maya MacIsaac-Jones	Canada	2:41.64	+12.20	
53	48	Annika Taylor	Great Britain	2:41.70	+12.26	
54	34	Laura Mononen	Finland	2:42.82	+13.38	
55	41	Monika Skinder	Poland	2:43.04	+13.60	
56	57	Izabela Marcisz	Poland	2:43.27	+13.83	
57	42	Alena Procházková	Slovakia	2:43.73	+14.29	
58	38	Ilaria Debertolis	Italy	2:44.61	+15.17	
59	61	Vedrana Malec	Croatia	2:45.17	+15.73	
60	60	Valentyna Kaminska	Ukraine	2:45.86	+16.42	
61	63	Elmira Mutagarova	Kazakhstan	2:46.32	+16.88	
62	49	Anna Shevchenko	Kazakhstan	2:46.66	+17.22	
63	69	Barbora Klementová	Slovakia	2:47.35	+17.91	
64	62	Irina Bykova	Kazakhstan	2:47.38	+17.94	
65	64	Kristrún Guðnadóttir	Iceland	2:47.46	+18.02	
66	71	Karen Chanloung	Thailand	2:47.64	+18.20	
67	66	Meng Honglian	China	2:47.94	+18.50	
68	68	Yuliya Krol	Ukraine	2:49.32	+19.88	
69	65	Barbara Jezeršek	Australia	2:51.17	+21.73	
70	72	Valeriya Tyuleneva	Kazakhstan	2:51.19	+21.75	
71	79	Aimee Watson	Australia	2:52.33	+22.89	
72	67	Katerina Paul	Australia	2:52.62	+23.18	
73	70	Tetiana Antypenko	Ukraine	2:54.77	+25.33	
74	74	Viktoriya Olekh	Ukraine	2:55.39	+25.95	
75	77	Jaqueline Mourão	Brazil	2:55.91	+26.47	
76	75	Nansi Okoro	Bulgaria	2:56.12	+26.68	
77	78	Kitija Auziņa	Latvia	3:00.41	+30.97	
78	83	Maria Ntanou	Greece	3:00.97	+31.53	
79	76	Maida Drndić	Serbia	3:02.57	+33.13	
80	93	Viktorija Todorovska	North Macedonia	3:05.48	+36.04	
81	73	Anja Ilić	Serbia	3:05.57	+36.13	
82	89	Gabrijela Škender	Croatia	3:10.42	+40.98	
83	113	Nika Jagečić	Croatia	3:10.52	+41.08	
84	100	Ayşenur Duman	Turkey	3:10.55	+41.11	
85	101	Melina Meyer Magulas	Greece	3:12.13	+42.69	
86	81	Martyna Biliūnaitė	Lithuania	3:12.34	+42.90	
87	80	Sanja Kusmuk	Bosnia and Herzegovina	3:12.37	+42.93	
88	109	Ana Cvetanovska	North Macedonia	3:14.24	+44.80	
89	112	Styliani Giannakoviti	Greece	3:14.58	+45.14	
90	96	Emilija Siavro	Lithuania	3:14.89	+45.45	
91	103	Georgia Nimpiti	Greece	3:16.31	+46.87	
92	99	Viktorija Jovanovska	North Macedonia	3:16.45	+47.01	
93	92	Anastasija Vojinović	Serbia	3:17.31	+47.87	
94	95	Ildikó Papp	Hungary	3:18.99	+49.55	
95	88	Claudia Salcedo	Chile	3:23.93	+54.49	
96	84	Catalina González	Argentina	3:25.86	+56.42	
97	90	Fausta Repečkaitė	Lithuania	3:27.39	+57.95	
98	105	Valentina Mirza	Moldova	3:27.85	+58.41	
99	94	Violeta Citovičiūtė	Lithuania	3:32.92	+1:03.48	
100	97	Samaneh Beyrami Baher	Iran	3:33.80	+1:04.36	
101	110	Anamarija Zafirovska	North Macedonia	3:44.32	+1:14.88	
102	108	Kunduz Abdykadyrova	Kyrgyzstan	3:45.73	+1:16.29	
103	86	Sahel Tir	Iran	3:45.88	+1:16.44	
104	98	Jelena Đorđević	Serbia	3:48.08	+1:18.64	
105	102	Samaneh Kiashemshaki	Iran	4:04.57	+1:35.13	
106	107	Poonyanuch Klobuczek	Thailand	4:09.64	+1:40.20	
107	82	Zahra Savehshemshaki	Iran	4:15.37	+1:45.93	
108	104	Nour Keirouz	Lebanon	4:25.44	+1:56.00	
109	106	Mery Kayrouz	Lebanon	4:38.63	+2:09.19	
110	111	Ghiwa Fakhry	Lebanon	5:55.20	+3:25.76	
	85	Enkhbayaryn Ariuntungalag	Mongolia	Did not start		
	87	Ariunsanaagiin Enkhtuul	Mongolia	Did not start		
	91	Dulamsürengiin Oyunchimeg	Mongolia	Did not start		

=== Quarterfinals ===
==== Quarterfinal 1 ====
Rank	Seed	Athlete	Country	Time	Deficit	Notes
1	13	Kristine Stavås Skistad	Norway	2:35.47		Q
2	12	Stina Nilsson	Sweden	2:35.51	+0.04	Q
3	4	Sophie Caldwell	United States	2:35.60	+0.13	
4	18	Yuliya Belorukova	Russia	2:37.38	+1.91	
5	29	Lucia Scardoni	Italy	2:38.00	+2.53	
6	8	Katja Višnar	Slovenia	2:38.10	+2.63	

==== Quarterfinal 2 ====
Rank	Seed	Athlete	Country	Time	Deficit	Notes
1	6	Maiken Caspersen Falla	Norway	2:30.11		Q
2	20	Jonna Sundling	Sweden	2:30.54	+0.43	Q
3	9	Natalya Nepryayeva	Russia	2:30.58	+0.47	LL
4	24	Elisa Brocard	Italy	2:31.68	+1.57	LL
5	5	Eva Urevc	Slovenia	2:33.34	+3.23	
6	30	Mariel Merlii Pulles	Estonia	2:36.68	+6.57	

==== Quarterfinal 3 ====
Rank	Seed	Athlete	Country	Time	Deficit	Notes
1	25	Mari Eide	Norway	2:35.97		Q
2	2	Nadine Fähndrich	Switzerland	2:36.10	+0.13	Q
3	3	Hanna Falk	Sweden	2:36.17	+0.20	
4	19	Laura Gimmler	Germany	2:37.67	+1.70	
5	10	Greta Laurent	Italy	2:37.85	+1.88	
6	27	Sofie Krehl	Germany	2:38.37	+2.40	

==== Quarterfinal 4 ====
Rank	Seed	Athlete	Country	Time	Deficit	Notes
1	26	Victoria Carl	Germany	2:33.36		Q
2	1	Maja Dahlqvist	Sweden	2:33.40	+0.04	Q
3	11	Tiril Udnes Weng	Norway	2:33.52	+0.16	
4	14	Sadie Bjornsen	United States	2:34.28	+0.92	
5	23	Natalya Matveyeva	Russia	2:36.07	+2.71	
6	16	Alenka Čebašek	Slovenia	2:36.41	+3.05	

==== Quarterfinal 5 ====
Rank	Seed	Athlete	Country	Time	Deficit	Notes
1	15	Jessie Diggins	United States	2:34.28		Q
2	17	Sandra Ringwald	Germany	2:34.45	+0.17	Q
3	21	Laurien van der Graaff	Switzerland	2:34.63	+0.35	
4	7	Anamarija Lampič	Slovenia	2:35.48	+1.20	
5	22	Julia Kern	United States	2:41.44	+7.16	
6	28	Tereza Beranová	Czech Republic	2:53.58	+19.30	

=== Semifinals ===
==== Semifinal 1 ====
Rank	Seed	Athlete	Country	Time	Deficit	Notes
1	6	Maiken Caspersen Falla	Norway	2:33.40		Q
2	12	Stina Nilsson	Sweden	2:33.57	+0.17	Q
3	20	Jonna Sundling	Sweden	2:34.56	+1.16	LL
4	25	Mari Eide	Norway	2:35.66	+2.26	LL
5	24	Elisa Brocard	Italy	2:36.17	+2.77	
6	13	Kristine Stavås Skistad	Norway	2:58.53	+25.13	

==== Semifinal 2 ====
Rank	Seed	Athlete	Country	Time	Deficit	Notes
1	1	Maja Dahlqvist	Sweden	2:37.16		Q
2	26	Victoria Carl	Germany	2:37.32	+0.16	Q
3	2	Nadine Fähndrich	Switzerland	2:37.40	+0.24	
4	15	Jessie Diggins	United States	2:37.53	+0.37	
5	9	Natalya Nepryaeva	Russia	2:37.74	+0.58	
6	17	Sandra Ringwald	Germany	2:37.91	+0.75	

=== Final ===
Rank	Seed	Athlete	Country	Time	Deficit	Notes
1st place, gold medalist(s)	6	Maiken Caspersen Falla	Norway	2:32.35		
2nd place, silver medalist(s)	12	Stina Nilsson	Sweden	2:34.01	+1.66	
3rd place, bronze medalist(s)	25	Mari Eide	Norway	2:35.19	+2.84	
4	20	Jonna Sundling	Sweden	2:35.52	+3.17	
5	26	Victoria Carl	Germany	2:38.06	+5.71	
6	1	Maja Dahlqvist	Sweden	3:03.84	+31.49	
