= FIS Nordic World Ski Championships 2019 – Women's 30 kilometre freestyle =

Women's 30 kilometre freestyle at the FIS Nordic World Ski Championships 2019
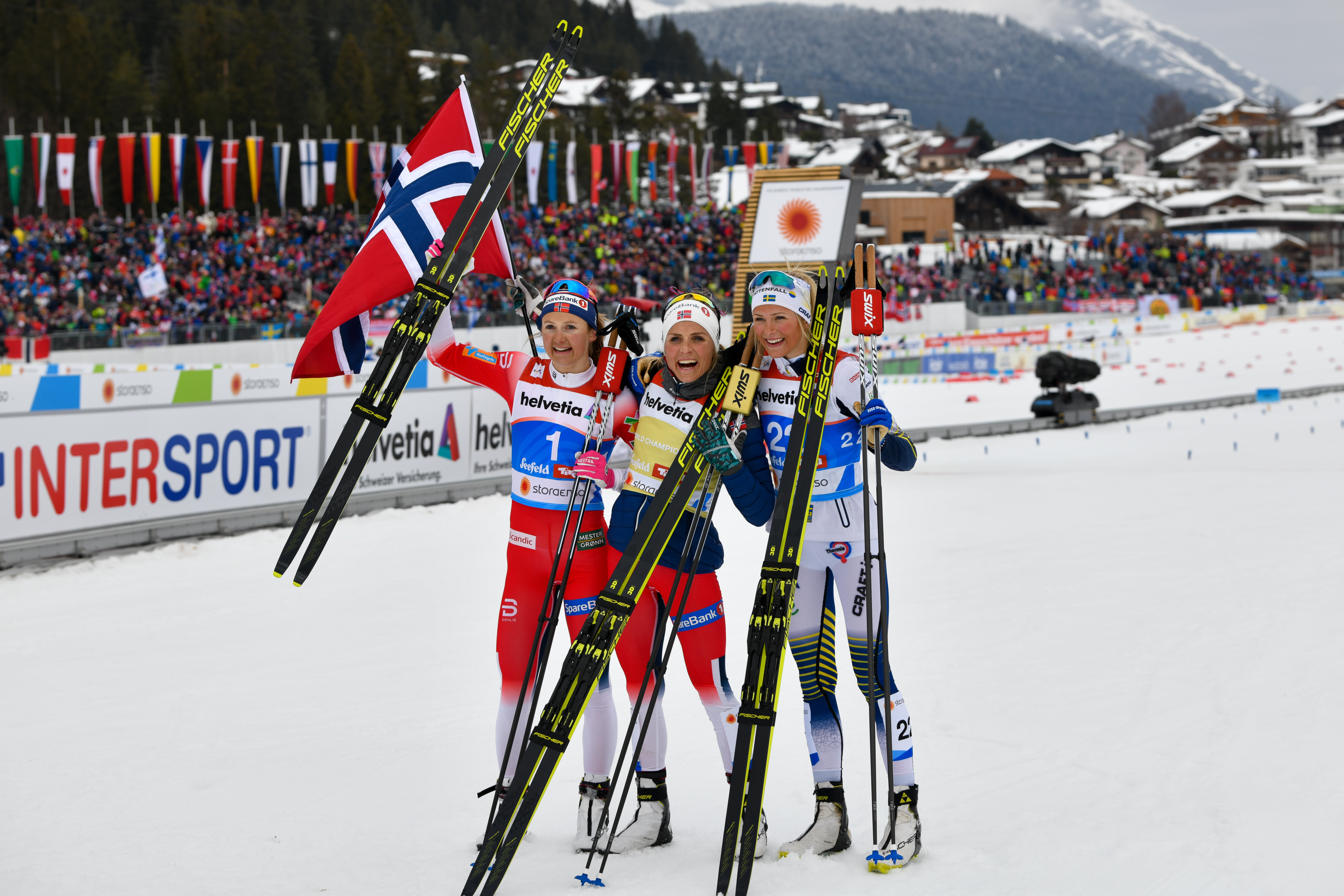
- Location: Seefeld in Tirol, Austria
- Date: 2 March
- Competitors: 48 from 17 nations
- Winning time: 1:14:26.2

Medalists
gold medal	Therese Johaug	Norway
silver medal	Ingvild Flugstad Østberg	Norway
bronze medal	Frida Karlsson	Sweden

The Women's 30 kilometre freestyle competition at the FIS Nordic World Ski Championships 2019 was held on 2 March 2019.

== Results ==
The race was started at 12:15.

Rank	Bib	Athlete	Country	Time	Deficit
1st place, gold medalist(s)	2	Therese Johaug	Norway	1:14:26.2	
2nd place, silver medalist(s)	1	Ingvild Flugstad Østberg	Norway	1:15:03.0	+36.8
3rd place, bronze medalist(s)	22	Frida Karlsson	Sweden	1:15:10.2	+44.0
4	5	Jessie Diggins	United States	1:15:32.1	+1:05.9
5	7	Charlotte Kalla	Sweden	1:15:42.8	+1:16.6
6	4	Ebba Andersson	Sweden	1:15:43.5	+1:17.3
7	13	Nathalie von Siebenthal	Switzerland	1:16:09.9	+1:43.7
8	8	Teresa Stadlober	Austria	1:16:30.0	+2:03.8
9	20	Victoria Carl	Germany	1:16:43.0	+2:16.8
10	10	Ragnhild Haga	Norway	1:16:51.5	+2:25.3
11	3	Krista Pärmäkoski	Finland	1:17:25.6	+2:59.4
12	9	Astrid Uhrenholdt Jacobsen	Norway	1:17:35.2	+3:09.0
13	15	Ida Ingemarsdotter	Sweden	1:18:35.9	+4:09.7
14	6	Anastasia Sedova	Russia	1:19:06.7	+4:40.5
15	11	Sadie Bjornsen	United States	1:19:09.1	+4:42.9
16	16	Rosie Brennan	United States	1:19:47.2	+5:21.0
17	17	Anna Nechaevskaya	Russia	1:19:49.0	+5:22.8
18	18	Laura Mononen	Finland	1:19:49.4	+5:23.2
19	32	Eveliina Piippo	Finland	1:19:50.0	+5:23.8
20	23	Elisa Brocard	Italy	1:20:10.5	+5:44.3
21	19	Katharina Hennig	Germany	1:20:25.1	+5:58.9
22	33	Riitta-Liisa Roponen	Finland	1:20:44.9	+6:18.7
23	30	Valeriya Tyuleneva	Kazakhstan	1:20:57.8	+6:31.6
24	12	Masako Ishida	Japan	1:21:14.8	+6:48.6
25	26	Pia Fink	Germany	1:21:33.5	+7:07.3
26	21	Anouk Faivre-Picon	France	1:21:47.7	+7:21.5
27	29	Yelena Soboleva	Russia	1:22:19.4	+7:53.2
28	36	Katherine Stewart-Jones	Canada	1:22:44.1	+8:17.9
29	14	Mariya Istomina	Russia	1:22:44.2	+8:18.0
30	31	Polina Seronosova	Belarus	1:23:01.5	+8:35.3
31	34	Jessica Yeaton	Australia	1:23:13.8	+8:47.6
32	39	Petra Nováková	Czech Republic	1:23:15.1	+8:48.9
33	28	Anna Shevchenko	Kazakhstan	1:23:15.6	+8:49.4
34	24	Caitlin Patterson	United States	1:23:15.6	+8:49.4
35	25	Sara Pellegrini	Italy	1:23:50.2	+9:24.0
36	48	Chi Chunxue	China	1:23:52.7	+9:26.5
37	37	Kateřina Razýmová	Czech Republic	1:23:52.8	+9:26.6
38	27	Ilaria Debertolis	Italy	1:24:28.5	+10:02.3
39	40	Emily Nishikawa	Canada	1:24:37.7	+10:11.5
40	35	Sandra Schützová	Czech Republic	1:24:46.7	+10:20.5
41	44	Dahria Beatty	Canada	1:26:00.7	+11:34.5
42	45	Miki Kodama	Japan	1:26:07.5	+11:41.3
43	41	Lisa Unterweger	Austria	1:27:36.3	+13:10.1
44	42	Irina Bykova	Kazakhstan	1:28:14.3	+13:48.1
45	46	Sumiko Ishigaki	Japan	1:28:36.1	+14:09.9
46	43	Cendrine Browne	Canada	1:29:16.2	+14:50.0
47	47	Barbara Jezeršek	Australia	1:30:03.8	+15:37.6
48	49	Aimee Watson	Australia	1:39:07.2	+24:41.0
	38	Marina Matrossova	Kazakhstan	Did not start	
