= FIS Nordic World Ski Championships 2017 – Women's 15 kilometre pursuit =

Women's 15 kilometre pursuit at the FIS Nordic World Ski Championships 2017
- Location: Lahti, Finland
- Date: 25 February
- Competitors: 50 from 21 nations
- Winning time: 37:57.5

Medalists
gold medal	Marit Bjørgen	Norway
silver medal	Krista Pärmäkoski	Finland
bronze medal	Charlotte Kalla	Sweden

The Women's 15 kilometre pursuit event of the FIS Nordic World Ski Championships 2017 was held on 25 February 2017.

== Results ==
The race was started at 12:00.

Rank	Bib	Athlete	Country	Time	Deficit
1st place, gold medalist(s)	4	Marit Bjørgen	Norway	37:57.5	
2nd place, silver medalist(s)	3	Krista Pärmäkoski	Finland	38:02.3	+4.8
3rd place, bronze medalist(s)	7	Charlotte Kalla	Sweden	38:29.5	+32.0
4	12	Nathalie von Siebenthal	Switzerland	39:02.5	+1:05.0
5	1	Heidi Weng	Norway	39:02.6	+1:05.1
6	10	Teresa Stadlober	Austria	39:02.9	+1:05.4
7	8	Yuliya Chekalyova	Russia	39:03.2	+1:05.7
8	14	Astrid Uhrenholdt Jacobsen	Norway	39:08.6	+1:11.1
9	19	Anastasia Sedova	Russia	39:12.8	+1:15.3
10	17	Masako Ishida	Japan	39:19.3	+1:21.8
11	24	Katharina Hennig	Germany	39:36.6	+1:39.1
12	11	Anne Kyllönen	Finland	39:36.8	+1:39.3
13	9	Laura Mononen	Finland	39:36.9	+1:39.4
14	18	Polina Kalsina	Russia	40:02.6	+2:05.1
15	22	Victoria Carl	Germany	40:03.3	+2:05.8
16	25	Sofie Krehl	Germany	40:04.1	+2:06.6
17	30	Kikkan Randall	United States	40:06.7	+2:09.2
18	15	Anna Haag	Sweden	40:08.5	+2:11.0
19	2	Ingvild Flugstad Østberg	Norway	40:09.7	+2:12.2
20	13	Liz Stephen	United States	40:09.9	+2:12.4
21	20	Sandra Ringwald	Germany	40:30.6	+2:33.1
22	21	Ebba Andersson	Sweden	40:39.9	+2:42.4
23	35	Anna Shevchenko	Kazakhstan	40:40.7	+2:43.2
24	40	Barbara Jezeršek	Australia	40:50.9	+2:53.4
25	23	Caterina Ganz	Italy	40:51.7	+2:54.2
26	6	Stina Nilsson	Sweden	40:57.7	+3:00.2
27	37	Kateřina Beroušková	Czech Republic	41:00.4	+3:02.9
28	32	Rosie Brennan	United States	41:00.7	+3:03.2
29	33	Johanna Matintalo	Finland	41:01.8	+3:04.3
30	26	Elisa Brocard	Italy	41:16.2	+3:18.7
31	16	Ilaria Debertolis	Italy	41:18.6	+3:21.1
32	29	Virginia De Martin Topranin	Italy	41:19.2	+3:21.7
33	31	Anna Medvedeva	Russia	41:41.8	+3:44.3
34	34	Alena Procházková	Slovakia	42:01.0	+4:03.5
35	41	Cendrine Browne	Canada	42:13.0	+4:15.5
36	39	Tetyana Antypenko	Ukraine	42:14.8	+4:17.3
37	43	Kornelia Kubińska	Poland	42:24.3	+4:26.8
38	28	Emily Nishikawa	Canada	42:26.8	+4:29.3
39	27	Alenka Čebašek	Slovenia	42:27.5	+4:30.0
40	42	Catherine Stewart-Jones	Canada	42:35.6	+4:38.1
41	38	Annika Taylor	Great Britain	42:47.2	+4:49.7
42	36	Valentyna Shevchenko	Ukraine	42:52.7	+4:55.2
43	45	Olga Mandrika	Kazakhstan	42:58.0	+5:00.5
44	49	Aimee Watson	Australia	43:42.1	+5:44.6
45	44	Martyna Galewicz	Poland	44:05.2	+6:07.7
46	47	Irina Bykova	Kazakhstan	44:18.2	+6:20.7
47	48	Tímea Lőrincz	Romania	44:42.3	+6:44.8
48	46	Valeriya Tyuleneva	Kazakhstan	44:50.0	+6:52.5
49	50	Elsa Guðrún Jónsdóttir	Iceland	47:39.6	+9:42.1
—	5	Jessie Diggins	United States	DNF	
