= FIS Nordic World Ski Championships 2019 – Women's team sprint =

Women's team sprint at the FIS Nordic World Ski Championships 2019
- Location: Seefeld in Tirol, Austria
- Dates: 24 February
- Competitors: 38 from 19 nations
- Teams: 19
- Winning time: 15:14.93

Medalists
gold medal	Stina Nilsson; Maja Dahlqvist	Sweden
silver medal	Katja Višnar; Anamarija Lampič	Slovenia
bronze medal	Ingvild Flugstad Østberg; Maiken Caspersen Falla	Norway

The Women's team sprint competition at the FIS Nordic World Ski Championships 2019 was held on 24 February 2019.

== Results ==
=== Semifinals ===
The semifinals were started at 09:15. The first two teams of each semifinals and the next six best timed teams advanced to the final.

==== Semifinal A ====
Rank	Bib	Country	Athletes	Time	Deficit	Notes
1	2	Sweden	Stina Nilsson; Maja Dahlqvist	15:36.52		Q
2	1	Norway	Ingvild Flugstad Østberg; Maiken Caspersen Falla	15:36.69	+0.17	Q
3	3	Finland	Anne Kyllönen; Krista Pärmäkoski	15:36.84	+0.32	q
4	4	Germany	Victoria Carl; Sandra Ringwald	15:36.88	+0.36	q
5	5	Italy	Greta Laurent; Lucia Scardoni	16:03.97	+27.45	
6	6	Canada	Emily Nishikawa; Dahria Beatty	16:12.65	+36.13	
7	8	Slovakia	Barbora Klementová; Alena Procházková	16:44.95	+1:08.43	
8	9	Great Britain	Annika Taylor; Nichole Bathe	16:47.60	+1:11.08	
9	7	Kazakhstan	Marina Matrossova; Elmira Mutagarova	17:07.03	+1:30.51	

==== Semifinal B ====
Rank	Bib	Country	Athletes	Time	Deficit	Notes
1	11	Russia	Natalya Nepryayeva; Yuliya Belorukova	15:34.54		Q
2	12	Switzerland	Laurien van der Graaff; Nadine Fähndrich	15:34.96	+0.42	Q
3	13	Slovenia	Katja Višnar; Anamarija Lampič	15:35.07	+0.53	q
4	10	United States	Sadie Bjornsen; Jessie Diggins	15:35.19	+0.65	q
5	15	Poland	Justyna Kowalczyk; Monika Skinder	15:50.80	+16.26	q
6	14	Belarus	Anastasia Kirillova; Polina Seronosova	15:58.12	+23.58	q
7	17	Czech Republic	Kateřina Janatová; Petra Hynčicová	16:24.92	+50.38	
8	18	China	Ma Qinghua; Meng Honglian	16:46.01	+1:11.47	
9	16	Ukraine	Yuliya Krol; Valentyna Kaminska	17:06.30	+1:31.76	
10	19	Thailand	Karen Chanloung; Poonyanuch Klobuczek	Lapped		

=== Final ===
The final was started at 11:30.

Rank	Bib	Country	Athletes	Time	Deficit
1st place, gold medalist(s)	2	Sweden	Stina Nilsson; Maja Dahlqvist	15:14.93	
2nd place, silver medalist(s)	13	Slovenia	Katja Višnar; Anamarija Lampič	15:15.30	+0.37
3rd place, bronze medalist(s)	1	Norway	Ingvild Flugstad Østberg; Maiken Caspersen Falla	15:15.53	+0.60
4	11	Russia	Natalya Nepryayeva; Yuliya Belorukova	15:15.86	+0.93
5	10	United States	Sadie Bjornsen; Jessie Diggins	15:17.72	+2.79
6	4	Germany	Victoria Carl; Sandra Ringwald	15:21.64	+6.71
7	3	Finland	Anne Kyllönen; Krista Pärmäkoski	15:23.79	+8.86
8	12	Switzerland	Laurien van der Graaff; Nadine Fähndrich	15:36.28	+21.35
9	14	Belarus	Anastasia Kirillova; Polina Seronosova	15:39.70	+24.77
10	15	Poland	Justyna Kowalczyk; Monika Skinder	16:00.99	+46.06
