= Polina Seronosova =

Belarusian cross-country skier (born 1993)

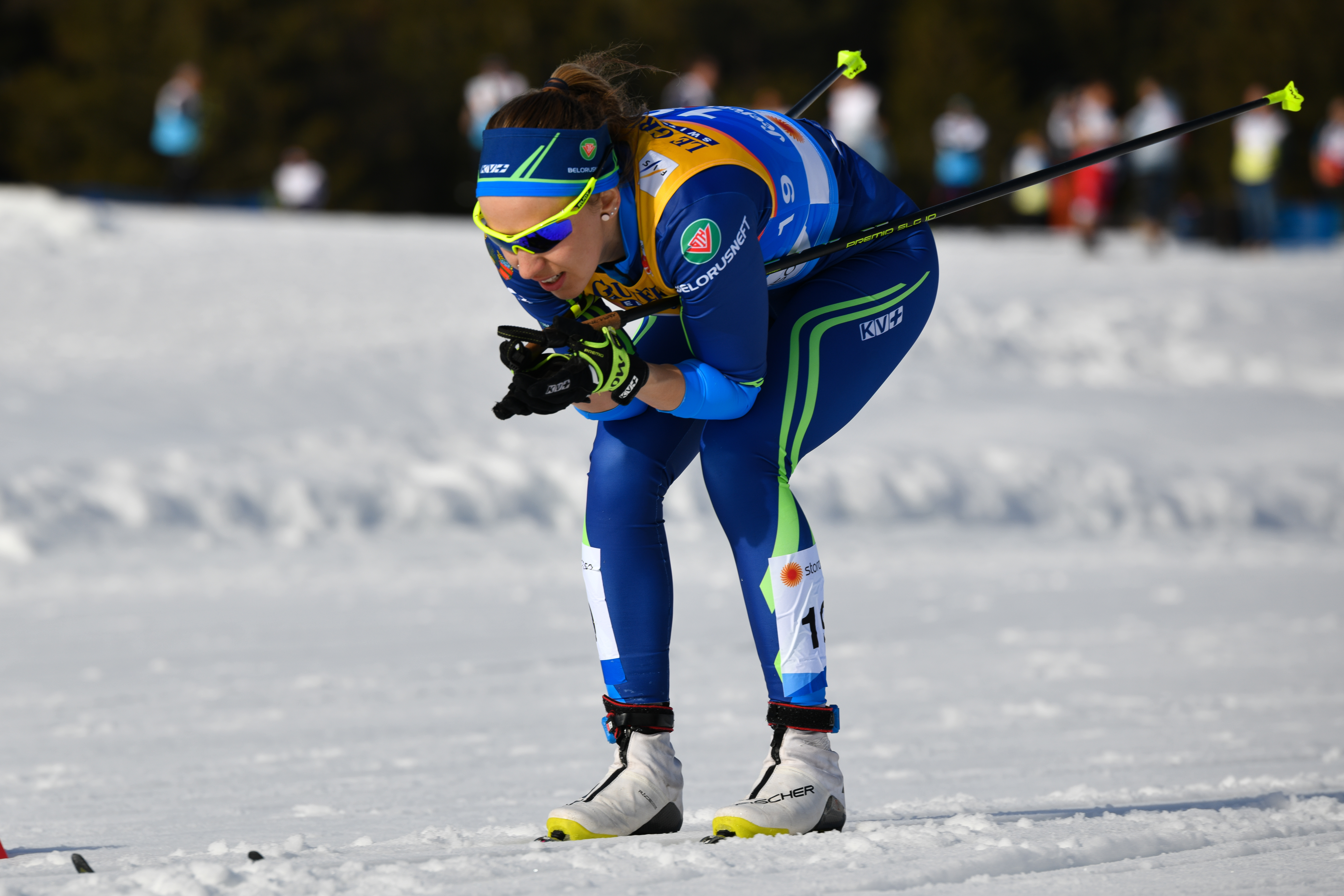
- Seronosova in 2019

Personal information
- Nationality: Belarus
- Born: 22 January 1993 (age 33) Nyukhcha, Republic of Karelia

Sport
- Sport: Skiing
- Sports career
- Sport: Cross-country skiing

Polina Seronosova (born 22 January 1993) is a Belarusian cross-country skier who competes internationally.

She competed for Belarus at the FIS Nordic World Ski Championships 2017 in Lahti, Finland.

Seronosova also competed for Belarus at the 2018 Winter Olympics in Pyeongchang, South Korea.
