= FIS Nordic World Ski Championships 2019 – Women's 10 kilometre classical =

Women's 10 kilometre classical at the FIS Nordic World Ski Championships 2019
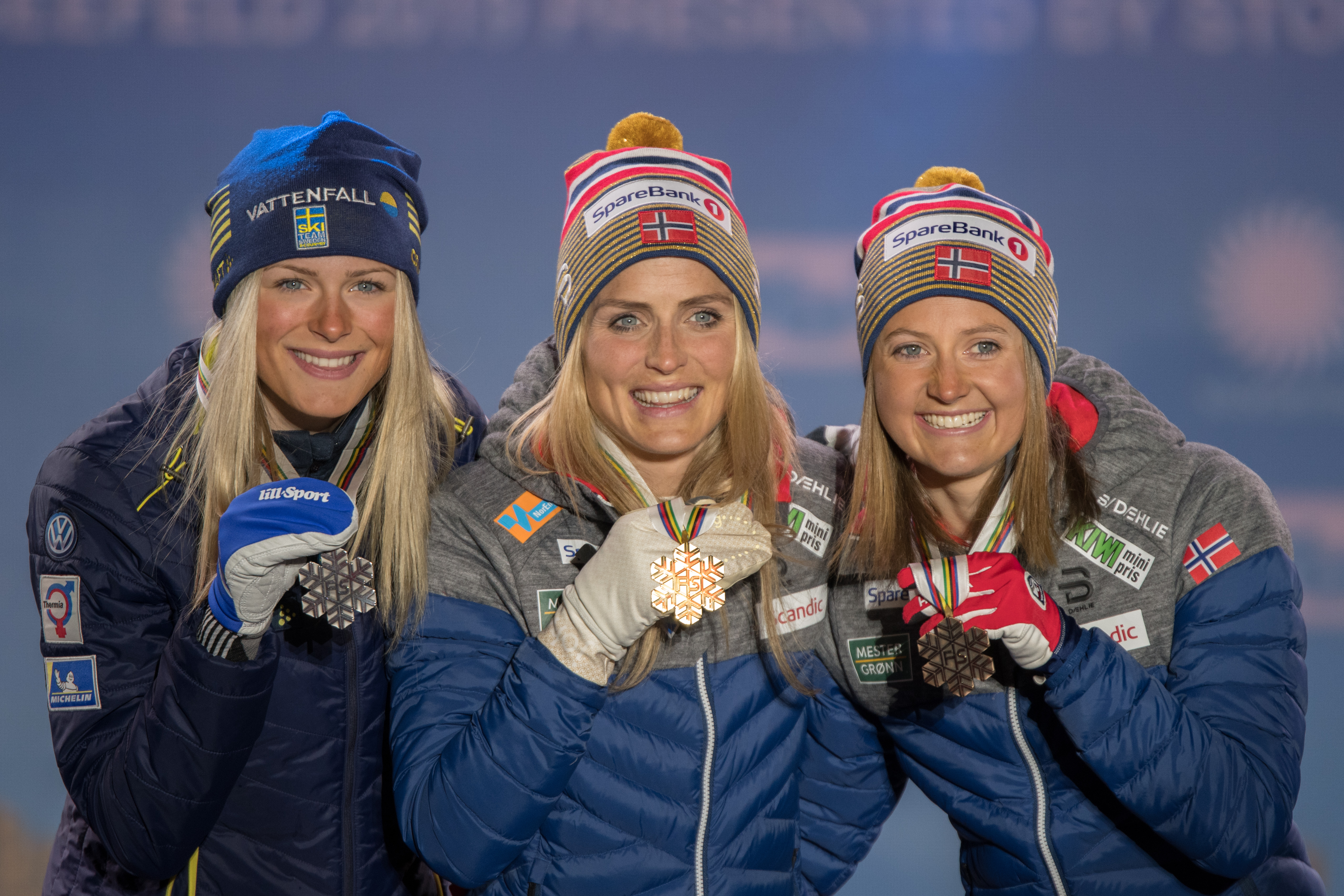
- Location: Seefeld in Tirol, Austria
- Dates: 20, 26 February
- Competitors: 74 from 31 nations
- Winning time: 27:02.1

Medalists
gold medal	Therese Johaug	Norway
silver medal	Frida Karlsson	Sweden
bronze medal	Ingvild Flugstad Østberg	Norway

The Women's 10 kilometre classical competition at the FIS Nordic World Ski Championships 2019 was held on 20 and 26 February 2019. A qualification was held on 20 February.

== Results ==
=== Qualification ===
The qualification was held on 20 February at 12:30.

Rank	Bib	Athlete	Country	Time	Deficit	Notes
1	18	Meng Honglian	China	15:57.0	–	Q
2	21	Jaqueline Mourão	Brazil	16:27.0	+30.0	Q
3	20	Katerina Paul	Australia	16:39.5	+42.5	Q
4	3	Ariunsanaagiin Enkhtuul	Mongolia	17:17.7	+1:20.7	Q
5	14	Ayşenur Duman	Turkey	17:32.2	+1:35.2	Q
6	5	Enkhbayaryn Ariuntungalag	Mongolia	17:32.9	+1:35.9	Q
7	23	Kristrún Guðnadóttir	Iceland	17:40.1	+1:43.1	Q
8	25	Maria Ntanou	Greece	17:58.6	+2:01.6	Q
9	19	Gabrijela Škender	Croatia	18:07.5	+2:10.5	Q
10	7	Nika Jagečić	Croatia	18:16.3	+2:19.3	Q
11	22	Catalin González	Argentina	18:21.0	+2:24.0	
12	2	Ildikó Papp	Hungary	18:23.5	+2:26.5	
13	1	Dulamsürengiin Oyunchimeg	Mongolia	18:34.4	+2:37.4	
14	26	Samaneh Beyrami Baher	Iran	19:07.3	+3:10.3	
15	24	Paraskevi Ladopoulou	Greece	19:07.5	+3:10.5	
16	11	Martyna Biliūnaitė	Lithuania	19:37.5	+3:40.5	
17	9	Fausta Repečkaitė	Lithuania	20:12.5	+4:15.5	
18	17	Nefeli Tita	Greece	20:26.8	+4:29.8	
19	6	Emilija Siavro	Lithuania	21:19.6	+5:22.6	
20	12	Samaneh Kiashemshaki	Iran	21:53.9	+5:56.9	
21	8	Violeta Citovičiūtė	Lithuania	22:02.6	+6:05.6	
22	15	Sahel Tir	Iran	22:18.7	+6:21.7	
23	16	Zahra Savehshemshaki	Iran	22:29.7	+6:32.7	
24	4	Poonyanuch Klobuczek	Thailand	25:50.8	+9:53.8	
	10	Evelin Laczkó	Hungary	Did not finish		
	13	Claudia Salcedo	Chile	Did not start		

=== Final ===
The race was started at 15:00.

Rank	Bib	Athlete	Country	Time	Deficit
1st place, gold medalist(s)	60	Therese Johaug	Norway	27:02.1	
2nd place, silver medalist(s)	28	Frida Karlsson	Sweden	27:14.3	+12.2
3rd place, bronze medalist(s)	58	Ingvild Flugstad Østberg	Norway	27:37.7	+35.6
4	54	Krista Pärmäkoski	Finland	27:39.1	+37.0
5	25	Nadine Fähndrich	Switzerland	28:06.0	+1:03.9
6	46	Anastasia Sedova	Russia	28:07.0	+1:04.9
7	56	Natalya Nepryayeva	Russia	28:09.6	+1:07.5
8	40	Teresa Stadlober	Austria	28:10.0	+1:07.9
9	44	Charlotte Kalla	Sweden	28:11.3	+1:09.2
10	32	Astrid Uhrenholdt Jacobsen	Norway	28:11.5	+1:09.4
11	27	Katharina Hennig	Germany	28:17.8	+1:15.7
12	48	Yuliya Belorukova	Russia	28:19.1	+1:17.0
13	8	Laura Gimmler	Germany	28:19.4	+1:17.3
14	14	Laura Mononen	Finland	28:20.2	+1:18.1
15	24	Pia Fink	Germany	28:25.5	+1:23.4
16	52	Ebba Andersson	Sweden	28:29.1	+1:27.0
17	22	Johanna Matintalo	Finland	28:34.0	+1:31.9
18	19	Polina Seronosova	Belarus	28:34.5	+1:32.4
19	42	Heidi Weng	Norway	28:35.9	+1:33.8
20	16	Anamarija Lampič	Slovenia	28:39.7	+1:37.6
21	29	Alisa Zhambalova	Russia	28:41.3	+1:39.2
22	30	Kerttu Niskanen	Finland	28:42.7	+1:40.6
23	38	Sadie Bjornsen	United States	28:43.1	+1:41.0
24	15	Rosie Brennan	United States	28:47.2	+1:45.1
25	50	Jessie Diggins	United States	28:54.0	+1:51.9
26	36	Masako Ishida	Japan	28:55.5	+1:53.4
27	18	Sandra Ringwald	Germany	29:08.9	+2:06.8
28	26	Anna Comarella	Italy	29:09.5	+2:07.4
29	11	Sophie Caldwell	United States	29:11.6	+2:09.5
30	20	Valeriya Tyuleneva	Kazakhstan	29:20.5	+2:18.4
31	2	Lisa Unterweger	Austria	29:23.0	+2:20.9
32	6	Alena Procházková	Slovakia	29:28.7	+2:26.6
33	34	Ida Ingemarsdotter	Sweden	29:29.5	+2:27.4
34	17	Lucia Scardoni	Italy	29:31.4	+2:29.3
35	4	Izabela Marcisz	Poland	29:31.9	+2:29.8
36	3	Emily Nishikawa	Canada	29:38.2	+2:36.1
37	7	Kateřina Razýmová	Czech Republic	29:46.9	+2:44.8
38	23	Anna Shevchenko	Kazakhstan	29:47.1	+2:45.0
39	13	Jessica Yeaton	Australia	29:49.2	+2:47.1
40	21	Caterina Ganz	Italy	30:03.5	+3:01.4
41	1	Irina Bykova	Kazakhstan	30:03.9	+3:01.8
42	35	Li Xin	China	30:05.2	+3:03.1
43	5	Marina Matrossova	Kazakhstan	30:15.3	+3:13.2
44	10	Tetyana Antypenko	Ukraine	30:23.1	+3:21.0
45	12	Sandra Schützová	Czech Republic	30:24.3	+3:22.2
46	53	Anita Klemenčič	Slovenia	30:33.4	+3:31.3
47	66	Chi Chunxue	China	30:37.0	+3:34.9
48	45	Petra Hynčicová	Czech Republic	30:40.2	+3:38.1
49	55	Dahria Beatty	Canada	30:41.4	+3:39.3
50	33	Nichole Bathe	Great Britain	30:44.1	+3:42.0
51	9	Katherine Stewart-Jones	Canada	30:47.1	+3:45.0
52	37	Patrīcija Eiduka	Latvia	30:54.2	+3:52.1
53	47	Carola Vila Obiols	Andorra	30:54.8	+3:52.7
54	57	Kozue Takizawa	Japan	31:00.8	+3:58.7
55	61	Mariel Merlii Pulles	Estonia	31:16.7	+4:14.6
56	43	Urszula Łętocha	Poland	31:19.1	+4:17.0
57	63	Weronika Kaleta	Poland	31:22.3	+4:20.2
58	39	Annika Taylor	Great Britain	31:23.6	+4:21.5
59	65	Ma Qinghua	China	31:26.0	+4:23.9
60	49	Kateřina Janatová	Czech Republic	31:32.8	+4:30.7
61	62	Anastasia Kirillova	Belarus	31:46.5	+4:44.4
62	70	Karen Chanloung	Thailand	31:47.6	+4:45.5
63	59	Valentyna Kaminska	Ukraine	32:20.9	+5:18.8
64	31	Vedrana Malec	Croatia	32:24.5	+5:22.4
65	51	Yuliya Krol	Ukraine	32:37.2	+5:35.1
66	64	Maya MacIsaac-Jones	Canada	32:38.0	+5:35.9
67	68	Katya Galstyan	Armenia	32:38.9	+5:36.8
68	71	Meng Honglian	China	32:42.2	+5:40.1
69	72	Aimee Watson	Australia	32:47.8	+5:45.7
70	41	Viktoriya Olekh	Ukraine	33:25.2	+6:23.1
71	74	Melina Meyer Magulas	Greece	33:29.6	+6:27.5
72	67	Nansi Okoro	Bulgaria	33:41.2	+6:39.1
73	69	Kristrún Guðnadóttir	Iceland	34:01.2	+6:59.1
74	73	Ayşenur Duman	Turkey	36:56.8	+9:54.7
