= 2016–17 FIS Cross-Country World Cup Finals =

International skiing competition

2016–17 FIS Cross-Country World Cup
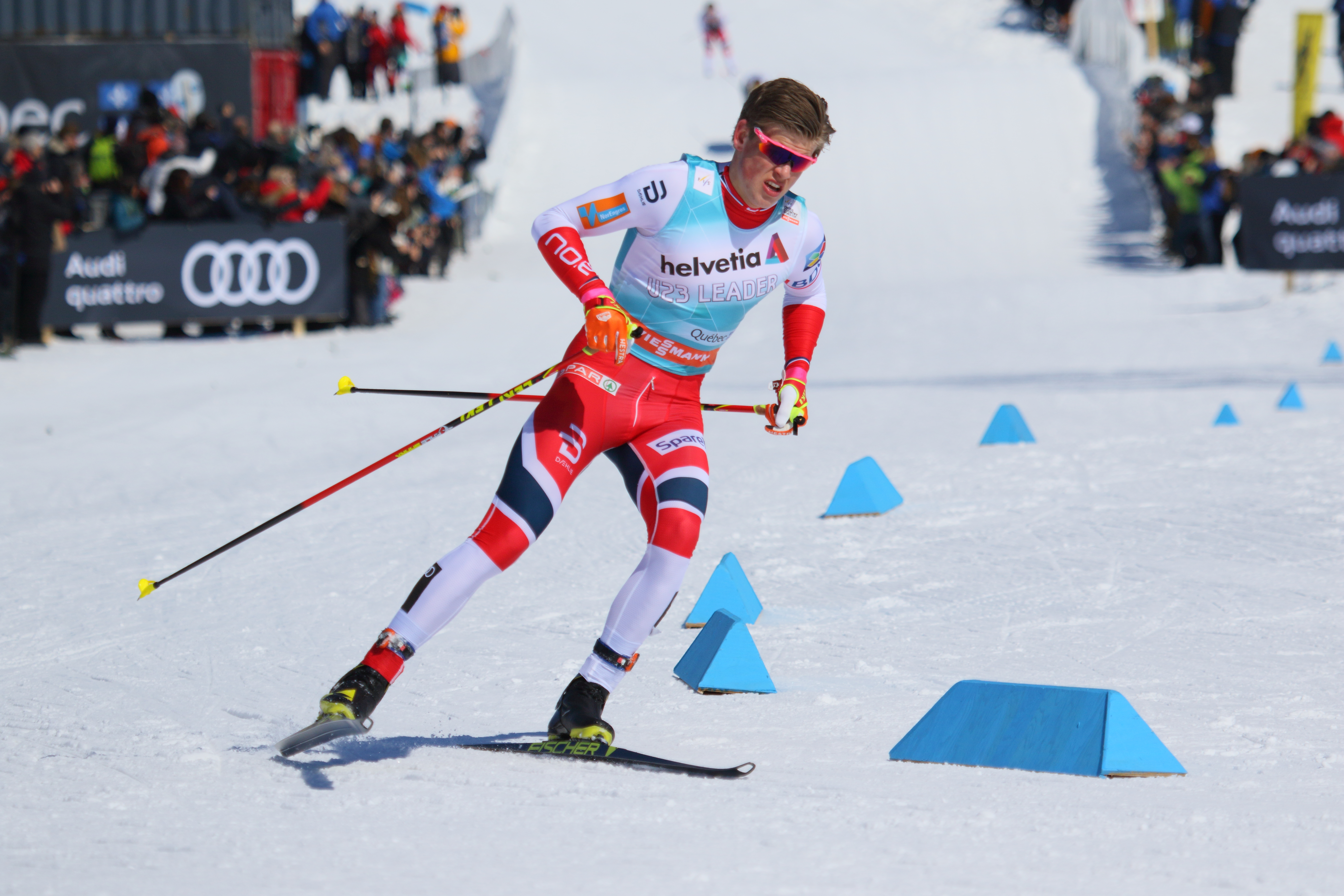
- Johannes Høsflot Klæbo during stage 3 of the men's competition

Ski tour details
- Venue(s): Québec City, Canada
- Dates: 16–18 March
- Stages: 3: Sprint F 10/15 km C Mass start 10/15 km F Pursuit

Results
Men
	Winner	Johannes Høsflot Klæbo (NOR)
	Second	Alex Harvey (CAN)
	Third	Niklas Dyrhaug (NOR)
Women
	Winner	Marit Bjørgen (NOR)
	Second	Heidi Weng (NOR)
	Third	Stina Nilsson (SWE)

The 2016–17 FIS Cross-Country World Cup Finals were the 9th edition of the FIS Cross-Country World Cup Finals, an annual cross-country skiing mini-tour event. The three-day event was held in Québec City, Canada. It began on 17 March 2017 and concluded on 19 March 2017. It was the final competition round of the 2016–17 FIS Cross-Country World Cup.

Alex Harvey of Canada and Stina Nilsson of Sweden won the first stage of the mini-tour; a sprint freestyle. Johannes Høsflot Klæbo of Norway took over the men's overall leadership after winning the second stage. Klæbo won the overall standings by defending his leading positions on the third stage. Marit Bjørgen of Norway won the two last stages; a mass start classic and a pursuit freestyle. She surpassed Heidi Weng; the leader of the ladies' overall standings after two stages, on the final stage.

== Overall leadership ==
The results in the overall standings were calculated by adding each rider's finishing times on each stage. On the sprint stage, the winners were awarded 30 bonus seconds. On the second stage, the three fastest skiers in finish were awarded 15, 10 and 5 bonus seconds, and the ten first skiers to pass the intermediate sprint points were also awarded bonus seconds. No bonus seconds were awarded on the third stage. The skier with the lowest cumulative time was the overall winner of the Cross-Country World Cup Finals.

Overall leadership by stage
Stage	Men		Women	
Stage	Winner	Overall standings	Winner	Overall standings
1	Alex Harvey	Alex Harvey	Stina Nilsson	Stina Nilsson
2	Johannes Høsflot Klæbo	Johannes Høsflot Klæbo	Marit Bjørgen	Heidi Weng
3	Marcus Hellner	Johannes Høsflot Klæbo	Marit Bjørgen	Marit Bjørgen
Final		Johannes Høsflot Klæbo	Final	Marit Bjørgen

== Overall standings ==
Men's overall standings (1–10)
Rank	Name	Time
1	Johannes Høsflot Klæbo (NOR)	1:09:50.6
2	Alex Harvey (CAN)	+0.0*
3	Niklas Dyrhaug (NOR)	+0.1
4	Sindre Bjørnestad Skar (NOR)	+26.1
5	Dario Cologna (SUI)	+26.5
6	Marcus Hellner (SWE)	+26.8
7	Sjur Røthe (NOR)	+27.2
8	Andrey Larkov (RUS)	+27.6
9	Andrew Musgrave (GBR)	+30.6
10	Didrik Tønseth (NOR)	+41.1

Women's overall standings (1–10)
Rank	Name	Time
1	Marit Bjørgen (NOR)	49:20.5
2	Heidi Weng (NOR)	+1.2
3	Stina Nilsson (SWE)	+1:00.0
4	Ida Ingemarsdotter (SWE)	+1:01.9
5	Krista Pärmäkoski (FIN)	+1:05.6
6	Ingvild Flugstad Østberg (NOR)	+1:06.8
7	Maiken Caspersen Falla (NOR)	+1:19.8
8	Charlotte Kalla (SWE)	+1:26.8
9	Nicole Fessel (GER)	+1:26.9
10	Sadie Bjornsen (USA)	+1:27.2

== Stages ==
=== Stage 1 ===
17 March 2017

- The skiers qualification times counted in the overall standings. Bonus seconds were awarded to the 30 skiers that qualifies for the quarter-finals, distributed as following:
  - Final: 30–27–24–23–22–21
  - Semi-final: 16–15–14–13–12–11
  - Quarter-final: 5–5–5–4–4–4–4–4–3–3–3–3–3–2–2–2–2–2

Men – 1.5 km Sprint Freestyle
Rank	Name	QT	Time	BS
1	Alex Harvey (CAN)	2:43.58 (4)	2:44.92	30
2	Finn Hågen Krogh (NOR)	2:42.87 (2)	+0.31	27
3	Richard Jouve (FRA)	2:46.05 (10)	+0.94	24
4	Simeon Hamilton (USA)	2:46.96 (16)	+1.01	23
5	Sindre Bjørnestad Skar (NOR)	2:46.89 (14)	+1.51	22
6	Lucas Chanavat (FRA)	2:43.17 (3)	+1.72	21
7	Federico Pellegrino (ITA)	2:43.95 (5)	SF	16
8	Johannes Høsflot Klæbo (NOR)	2:39.44 (1)	SF	15
9	Andrey Larkov (RUS)	2:47.36 (18)	SF	14
10	Jesse Cockney (CAN)	2:49.34 (28)	SF	13

Women – 1.5 km Sprint Freestyle
Rank	Name	QT	Time	BS
1	Stina Nilsson (SWE)	3:06.21 (4)	3:01.87	30
2	Maiken Caspersen Falla (NOR)	3:04.63 (2)	+0.42	27
3	Hanna Falk (SWE)	3:02.91 (1)	+2.58	24
4	Ida Ingemarsdotter (SWE)	3:08.84 (12)	+3.02	23
5	Nadine Fähndrich (SUI)	3:10.53 (17)	+3.41	22
6	Heidi Weng (NOR)	3:06.25 (5)	+32.36	21
7	Marit Bjørgen (NOR)	3:04.80 (3)	SF	16
8	Ingvild Flugstad Østberg (NOR)	3:06.82 (7)	SF	15
9	Jessie Diggins (USA)	3:08.77 (11)	SF	14
10	Laurien van der Graaff (SUI)	3:10.45 (16)	SF	13

=== Stage 2 ===
18 March 2017
Bonus seconds:

- Men: 2 intermediate sprints, bonus seconds to the 10 first skiers (15–12–10–8–6–5–4–3–2–1) past the intermediate points.
- Women: 1 intermediate sprint, bonus seconds to the 10 first skiers (15–12–10–8–6–5–4–3–2–1) past the intermediate point.
- Bonus seconds in finish: 15–10–5 to the 3 first skiers crossing the finish line.

Men – 15 km Classical (mass start)
Rank	Name	Time	BS
1	Johannes Høsflot Klæbo (NOR)	35:23.7	42
2	Niklas Dyrhaug (NOR)	+0.5	32
3	Alexander Bessmertnykh (RUS)	+0.8	10
4	Alex Harvey (CAN)	+0.8	9
5	Sjur Røthe (NOR)	+1.7	8
6	Dario Cologna (SUI)	+1.9	2
7	Pål Golberg (NOR)	+2.5	5
8	Didrik Tønseth (NOR)	+3.0	14
9	Andrey Larkov (RUS)	+3.7	1
10	Dietmar Nöckler (ITA)	+5.1	

Women – 10 km Classical (mass start)
Rank	Name	Time	BS
1	Marit Bjørgen (NOR)	24:23.6	27
2	Heidi Weng (NOR)	+0.6	25
3	Krista Pärmäkoski (FIN)	+2.9	5
4	Ingvild Flugstad Østberg (NOR)	+7.8	10
5	Nicole Fessel (GER)	+18.6	1
6	Charlotte Kalla (SWE)	+18.8	
7	Anna Haag (SWE)	+19.1	
8	Maiken Caspersen Falla (NOR)	+23.1	8
9	Kathrine Harsem (NOR)	+23.5	4
10	Kerttu Niskanen (FIN)	+23.8	

=== Stage 3 ===
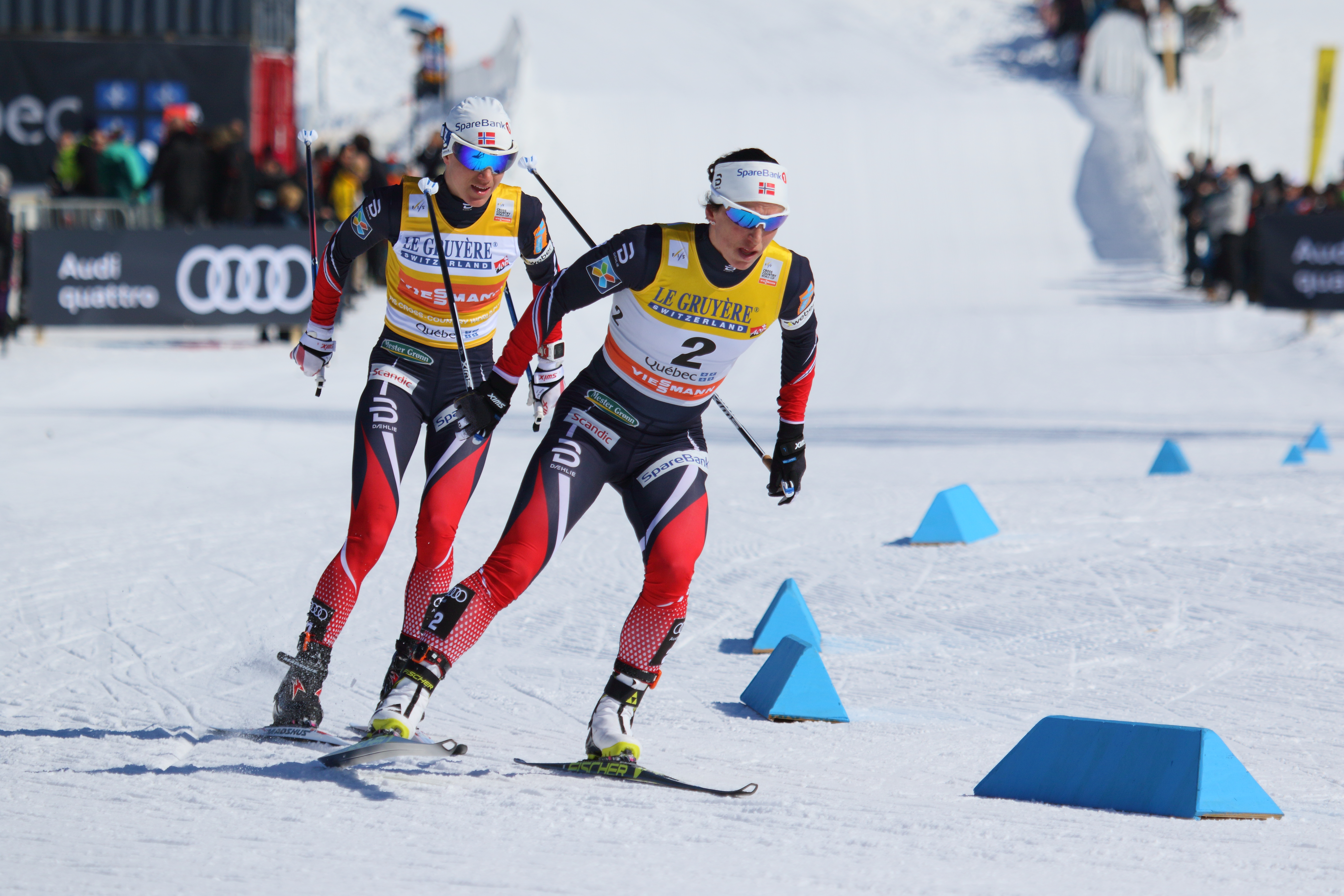
Heidi Weng and Marit Bjørgen during stage 3 of the competition

19 March 2017

- The race for "Winner of the Day" counted for 2016–17 FIS Cross-Country World Cup points. No bonus seconds were awarded on this stage.

Men – 15 km Freestyle (pursuit)
Rank	Name	Time
1	Marcus Hellner (SWE)	31:55.5
2	Andrew Musgrave (GBR)	+6.3
3	Sjur Røthe (NOR)	+11.9
4	Dario Cologna (SUI)	+12.9
5	Andrey Larkov (RUS)	+23.0
6	Alex Harvey (CAN)	+25.7
6	Sindre Bjørnestad Skar (NOR)	+25.7
8	Niklas Dyrhaug (NOR)	+26.3
9	Didrik Tønseth (NOR)	+31.6
10	Federico Pellegrino (ITA)	+39.0

Women – 10 km Freestyle (pursuit)
Rank	Name	Time
1	Marit Bjørgen (NOR)	22:35.1
2	Heidi Weng (NOR)	+2.2
3	Stina Nilsson (SWE)	+11.9
4	Nicole Fessel (GER)	+15.3
5	Charlotte Kalla (SWE)	+17.8
5	Sadie Bjornsen (USA)	+17.8
7	Ida Ingemarsdotter (SWE)	+18.7
8	Krista Pärmäkoski (FIN)	+19.7
9	Ragnhild Haga (NOR)	+22.2
10	Nathalie von Siebenthal (SUI)	+25.4

== World Cup points distribution ==
The overall winners were awarded 200 points. The winners of each of the three stages are awarded 50 points. The maximum number of points an athlete could earn was therefore 350 points.

Position	1	2	3	4	5	6	7	8	9	10	11	12	13	14	15	16	17	18	19	20	21	22	23	24	25	26	27	28	29	30
Overall	200	160	120	100	90	80	72	64	58	52	48	44	40	36	32	30	28	26	24	22	20	18	16	14	12	10	8	6	4	2
Stage	50	46	43	40	37	34	32	30	28	26	24	22	20	18	16	15	14	13	12	11	10	9	8	7	6	5	4	3	2	1
