= 2016–17 Tour de Ski =

Cross-country skiing event

Tour de Ski
2016–17 FIS Cross-Country World Cup

Ski tour details
- Venue(s): Val Müstair, Switzerland; Oberstdorf, Germany; Toblach, Italy; Val di Fiemme, Italy
- Dates: 31 December 2016 – 8 January 2017
- Stages: 7

Results
Men
Jersey awarded to the men's overall winner	Winner	Sergey Ustiugov (RUS)
	Second	Martin Johnsrud Sundby (NOR)
	Third	Dario Cologna (SUI)
Jersey awarded to the men's sprint classification winner	Sprint	Sergey Ustiugov (RUS)
Women
Jersey awarded to the women's overall winner	Winner	Heidi Weng (NOR)
	Second	Krista Pärmäkoski (FIN)
	Third	Stina Nilsson (SWE)
Jersey awarded to the women's sprint classification winner	Sprint	Stina Nilsson (SWE)

The 2016–17 Tour de Ski was the 11th edition of the Tour de Ski. The World Cup stage event began in Val Müstair, Switzerland on December 31, 2016, and ended in Val di Fiemme, Italy on January 8, 2017. The cups were being defended by Therese Johaug (Norway) and Martin Johnsrud Sundby (Norway).

== Schedule ==
Stage	Venue	Date	Event	Technique	Distance		Start time (CET)	
Stage	Venue	Date	Event	Technique	Women	Men	Women	Men
1	Val Müstair (SUI)	31 December 2016	Sprint	Freestyle	1.4 km	1.4 km	14:50	14:50
2	Val Müstair (SUI)	1 January 2017	Distance, mass start	Classic	5 km	10 km	16:00	13:00
3	Oberstdorf (GER)	3 January 2017	Skiathlon	Classic/Freestyle	10 km	20 km	12:15	15:15
4	Oberstdorf (GER)	4 January 2017	Distance, pursuit	Freestyle	10 km	15 km	11:30	12:45
5	Toblach (ITA)	6 January 2017	Distance, interval start	Freestyle	5 km	10 km	13:00	10:45
6	Val di Fiemme (ITA)	7 January 2017	Distance, mass start	Classic	10 km	15 km	14:30	15:30
7	Val di Fiemme (ITA)	8 January 2017	Final climb, pursuit	Freestyle	9 km	9 km	11:30	15:30

== Overall leadership ==
Overall leadership by stage
Stage	Men			Women		
Stage	Winner	Overall standings	Sprint standings	Winner	Overall standings	Sprint standings
1	Sergey Ustiugov	Sergey Ustiugov	Sergey Ustiugov	Stina Nilsson	Stina Nilsson	Stina Nilsson
2	Sergey Ustiugov	Sergey Ustiugov	Sergey Ustiugov	Ingvild Flugstad Østberg	Ingvild Flugstad Østberg	Heidi Weng
3	Sergey Ustiugov	Sergey Ustiugov	Sergey Ustiugov	Stina Nilsson	Stina Nilsson	Stina Nilsson
4	Sergey Ustiugov	Sergey Ustiugov	Sergey Ustiugov	Stina Nilsson	Stina Nilsson	Stina Nilsson
5	Sergey Ustiugov	Sergey Ustiugov	Sergey Ustiugov	Jessie Diggins	Heidi Weng	Stina Nilsson
6	Martin Johnsrud Sundby	Sergey Ustiugov	Sergey Ustiugov	Stina Nilsson	Stina Nilsson	Stina Nilsson
7	Maurice Manificat	Sergey Ustiugov	Sergey Ustiugov	Heidi Weng	Heidi Weng	Stina Nilsson
Final		Sergey Ustiugov	Sergey Ustiugov	Final	Heidi Weng	Stina Nilsson

== Final standings ==
Legend
Denotes the winner of the Overall standings	Denotes the winner of the Sprint standings

=== Overall standings ===
==== Men ====
Final overall standings (1–10)
Rank	Name	Time
1	Sergey Ustiugov (RUS)	3:24:47.9
2	Martin Johnsrud Sundby (NOR)	+1:02.9
3	Dario Cologna (SUI)	+1:19.1
4	Maurice Manificat (FRA)	+1:26.9
5	Matti Heikkinen (FIN)	+1:31.3
6	Marcus Hellner (SWE)	+2:05.8
7	Alex Harvey (CAN)	+2:39.7
8	Simen Hegstad Krüger (NOR)	+3:27.2
9	Hans Christer Holund (NOR)	+3:50.4
10	Niklas Dyrhaug (NOR)	+4:24.9

Final overall standings (11–40)
Rank	Name	Time
11	Sjur Røthe (NOR)	+4:56.4
12	Didrik Tønseth (NOR)	+5:07.7
13	Alexander Bessmertnykh (RUS)	+5:14.2
14	Francesco De Fabiani (ITA)	+5:20.4
15	Jean-Marc Gaillard (FRA)	+5:28.3
16	Jens Burman (SWE)	+5:30.3
17	Florian Notz (GER)	+5:43.1
18	Andrew Musgrave (GBR)	+6:07.7
19	Lucas Bögl (GER)	+6:13.1
20	Toni Livers (SUI)	+6:19.6
21	Jonas Baumann (SUI)	+7:46.0
22	Andrey Larkov (RUS)	+8:02.3
23	Clément Parisse (FRA)	+8:16.1
24	Daniel Rickardsson (SWE)	+8:45.6
25	Devon Kershaw (CAN)	+9:32.2
26	Noah Hoffman (USA)	+9:40.3
27	Andrey Melnichenko (RUS)	+10:01.1
28	Giandomenico Salvadori (ITA)	+10:09.5
29	Petr Sedov (RUS)	+10:14.8
30	Thomas Bing (GER)	+10:25.2
31	Perttu Hyvärinen (FIN)	+10:25.3
32	Axel Ekström (SWE)	+10:28.6
33	Paul Constantin Pepene (ROU)	+11:04.8
34	Viktor Thorn (SWE)	+11:13.7
35	Alexis Jeannerod (FRA)	+11:18.9
36	Ermil Vokuev (RUS)	+12:18.0
37	Valentin Mättig (GER)	+12:44.6
38	Max Hauke (AUT)	+14:01.4
39	Maicol Rastelli (ITA)	+14:42.1
40	Indulis Bikše (LAT)	+18:59.8

==== Women ====
Final overall standings (1–10)
Rank	Name	Time
1	Heidi Weng (NOR)	2:27:39.4
2	Krista Pärmäkoski (FIN)	+1:37.0
3	Stina Nilsson (SWE)	+1:54.4
4	Ingvild Flugstad Østberg (NOR)	+2:04.3
5	Jessie Diggins (USA)	+3:09.0
6	Kerttu Niskanen (FIN)	+4:18.2
7	Anne Kyllönen (FIN)	+4:27.7
8	Nathalie von Siebenthal (SUI)	+4:39.5
9	Teresa Stadlober (AUT)	+4:44.1
10	Yuliya Chekalyova (RUS)	+4:58.7

Final overall standings (11–31)
Rank	Name	Time
11	Charlotte Kalla (SWE)	+5:27.0
12	Laura Mononen (FIN)	+6:04.8
13	Stefanie Böhler (GER)	+6:16.5
14	Elizabeth Stephen (USA)	+6:45.6
15	Nicole Fessel (GER)	+7:04.4
16	Silje Øyre Slind (NOR)	+7:21.1
17	Aino-Kaisa Saarinen (FIN)	+7:38.2
18	Kathrine Rolsted Harsem (NOR)	+7:43.6
19	Ilaria Debertolis (ITA)	+8:14.1
20	Polina Kalsina (RUS)	+8:28.6
21	Elisa Brocard (ITA)	+8:42.6
22	Elena Soboleva (RUS)	+9:16.9
23	Emma Wikén (SWE)	+9:26.2
24	Virginia De Martin Topranin (ITA)	+9:34.3
25	Evelina Settlin (SWE)	+9:46.1
26	Mariya Guschina (RUS)	+11:25.6
27	Maria Nordström (SWE)	+12:03.7
28	Rosie Brennan (USA)	+12:59.9
29	Giulia Stuerz (ITA)	+13:51.9
30	Alisa Zhambalova (RUS)	+15:13.5
31	Olga Tsareva (RUS)	+18:22.4

=== Sprint standings ===
==== Men ====
Final sprint standings (1–10)
Rank	Name	Bonus Time
1	Sergey Ustiugov (RUS)	2:40
2	Martin Johnsrud Sundby (NOR)	2:18
3	Alex Harvey (CAN)	1:27
4	Dario Cologna (SUI)	1:02
5	Andrey Larkov (RUS)	0:46
6	Marcus Hellner (SWE)	0:44
7	Thomas Bing (GER)	0:38
8	Maurice Manificat (FRA)	0:37
9	Didrik Tønseth (NOR)	0:35
10	Andrew Musgrave (GBR)	0:34

==== Women ====
Final sprint standings (1–10)
Rank	Name	Bonus Time
1	Stina Nilsson (SWE)	2:22
2	Heidi Weng (NOR)	1:47
3	Ingvild Flugstad Østberg (NOR)	1:35
4	Krista Pärmäkoski (FIN)	1:18
5	Jessie Diggins (USA)	1:14
6	Kathrine Harsem (NOR)	1:04
7	Evelina Settlin (SWE)	0:16
8	Anne Kyllönen (FIN)	0:14
9	Charlotte Kalla (SWE)	0:14
10	Ilaria Debertolis (ITA)	0:14

== Stages ==
=== Stage 1 ===
31 December 2016, Val Müstair, Switzerland

Men – 1.5 km Sprint Freestyle
Place	Name	Time	BS
1	Sergey Ustiugov (RUS)	3:00.50	60
2	Federico Pellegrino (ITA)	+2.03	56
3	Finn Hågen Krogh (NOR)	+2.80	52
4	Martin Johnsrud Sundby (NOR)	+3.52	48
5	Lucas Chanavat (FRA)	+10.25	44
6	Alex Harvey (CAN)	+15.93	42

Women – 1.5 km Sprint Freestyle
Place	Name	Time	BS
1	Stina Nilsson (SWE)	3:26.27	60
2	Maiken Caspersen Falla (NOR)	+2.48	56
3	Heidi Weng (NOR)	+6.47	52
4	Kathrine Rolsted Harsem (NOR)	+6.95	48
5	Laurien van der Graaff (SUI)	+6.96	44
6	Jessie Diggins (USA)	+7.64	42

=== Stage 2 ===
1 January 2017, Val Müstair, Switzerland

- 1 intermediate sprint, bonus seconds to the 10 first skiers (15–12–10–8–6–5–4–3–2–1) past the intermediate point.
- Bonus seconds in finish: 15-10-5 to the 3 first skiers crossing the finish line.

Men – 10 km Classic (mass start)
Place	Name	Time	BS
1	Sergey Ustiugov (RUS)	24:50.0	25
2	Martin Johnsrud Sundby (NOR)	+1.9	25
3	Didrik Tønseth (NOR)	+2.3	11
4	Sjur Røthe (NOR)	+3.3	3
5	Dario Cologna (SUI)	+5.5	8
6	Matti Heikkinen (FIN)	+5.6	

Women – 5 km Classic (mass start)
Place	Name	Time	BS
1	Ingvild Flugstad Østberg (NOR)	13:21.2	30
2	Heidi Weng (NOR)	+7.0	22
3	Krista Pärmäkoski (FIN)	+11.4	13
4	Nadine Fähndrich (SUI)	+24.6	
5	Stina Nilsson (SWE)	+25.1	10
6	Anne Kyllönen (FIN)	+26.0	10

=== Stage 3 ===
3 January 2017, Oberstdorf, Germany

- Men: 2 intermediate sprints, bonus seconds to the 10 first skiers (15–12–10–8–6–5–4–3–2–1) past the intermediate points.
- Women: 1 intermediate sprint, bonus seconds to the 10 first skiers (15–12–10–8–6–5–4–3–2–1) past the intermediate point.
- Bonus seconds in finish: 15-10-5 to the 3 first skiers crossing the finish line.

Men – 20 km Skiathlon
Place	Name	Time	BS
1	Sergey Ustiugov (RUS)	48:40.4	32
2	Martin Johnsrud Sundby (NOR)	+0.6	22
3	Dario Cologna (SUI)	+1.0	18
4	Alex Harvey (CAN)	+2.7	25
5	Marcus Hellner (SWE)	+3.6	12
6	Simen Hegstad Krüger (NOR)	+3.8	8

Women – 10 km Skiathlon
Place	Name	Time	BS
1	Stina Nilsson (SWE)	27:23.8	27
2	Jessie Diggins (USA)	+0.2	13
3	Heidi Weng (NOR)	+1.5	11
4	Maiken Caspersen Falla (NOR)	+3.3	5
5	Sadie Bjornsen (USA)	+8.1	
6	Nicole Fessel (GER)	+8.1	

=== Stage 4 ===
4 January 2017, Oberstdorf, Germany

- Bonus seconds in finish: 15-10-5 to the 3 first skiers crossing the finish line.

Men – 15 km Freestyle (pursuit)
Place	Name	Time	BS
1	Sergey Ustiugov (RUS)	37:58.5	15
2	Martin Johnsrud Sundby (NOR)	+37.2	10
3	Alex Harvey (CAN)	+1:08.8	5
4	Dario Cologna (SUI)	+1:09.6	
5	Matti Heikkinen (FIN)	+1:45.0	
6	Marcus Hellner (SWE)	+1:47.6	

Women – 10 km Freestyle (pursuit)
Place	Name	Time	BS
1	Stina Nilsson (SWE)	27:42.7	15
2	Heidi Weng (NOR)	+1.7	10
3	Ingvild Flugstad Østberg (NOR)	+1.8	5
4	Krista Pärmäkoski (FIN)	+42.4	
5	Jessie Diggins (USA)	+1:47.5	
6	Nicole Fessel (GER)	+2:39.1	

=== Stage 5 ===
6 January 2016, Toblach, Italy

- Bonus seconds in finish: 15-10-5 to the 3 fastest skiers.

Men – 10 km Freestyle (individual)
Place	Name	Time	BS
1	Sergey Ustiugov (RUS)	21:47.9	15
2	Maurice Manificat (FRA)	+0.4	10
3	Simen Hegstad Krüger (NOR)	+16.6	5
4	Matti Heikkinen (FIN)	+17.3	
5	Marcus Hellner (SWE)	+25.8	
6	Didrik Tønseth (NOR)	+27.2	

Women – 5 km Freestyle (individual)
Place	Name	Time	BS
1	Jessie Diggins (USA)	12:45.6	15
2	Krista Pärmäkoski (FIN)	+13.6	10
3	Sadie Bjornsen (USA)	+14.6	5
4	Charlotte Kalla (SWE)	+14.9	
5	Heidi Weng (NOR)	+17.5	
6	Kerttu Niskanen (FIN)	+18.0	

=== Stage 6 ===
7 January 2017, Val di Fiemme, Italy

- Men: 2 intermediate sprints, bonus seconds to the 10 first skiers (15–12–10–8–6–5–4–3–2–1) past the intermediate points.
- Ladies: 1 intermediate sprint, bonus seconds to the 10 first skiers (15–12–10–8–6–5–4–3–2–1) past the intermediate point.
- Bonus seconds in finish: 15-10-5 to the 3 first skiers crossing the finish line.

Men – 15 km Classic (mass start)
Place	Name	Time	BS
1	Martin Johnsrud Sundby (NOR)	40:40.0	33
2	Sergey Ustiugov (RUS)	+2.2	13
3	Matti Heikkinen (FIN)	+2.8	13
4	Francesco de Fabiani (ITA)	+3.2	1
5	Andrey Larkov (RUS)	+3.3	6
6	Niklas Dyrhaug (NOR)	+3.5	12

Women – 10 km Classic (mass start)
Place	Name	Time	BS
1	Stina Nilsson (SWE)	30:20.8	30
2	Anne Kyllönen (FIN)	+3.0	13
3	Charlotte Kalla (SWE)	+3.7	5
4	Krista Pärmäkoski (FIN)	+9.4	6
5	Teresa Stadlober (AUT)	+10.1	4
6	Yuliya Chekalyova (RUS)	+10.1	5

=== Stage 7 ===
8 January 2017, Val di Fiemme, Italy

The race for Fastest of the Day counts for 2016–17 FIS Cross-Country World Cup points. No bonus seconds were awarded on this stage.

Men – 9 km Final Climb Freestyle (pursuit)
Place	Name	Time
1	Maurice Manificat (FRA)	30:27.7
2	Matti Heikkinen (FIN)	+6.1
3	Hans Christer Holund (NOR)	+15.8
4	Marcus Hellner (SWE)	+19.0
5	Dario Cologna (SUI)	+22.7
6	Alexander Bessmertnykh (RUS)	+37.5

Women – 9 km Final Climb Freestyle (pursuit)
Place	Name	Time
1	Heidi Weng (NOR)	33:34.3
2	Elizabeth Stephen (USA)	+38.2
3	Kerttu Niskanen (FIN)	+46.0
4	Teresa Stadlober (AUT)	+49.7
5	Anne Kyllönen (FIN)	+1:00.1
6	Ingvild Flugstad Østberg (NOR)	+1:00.2
