= Mari Eide =

Norwegian cross-country skier

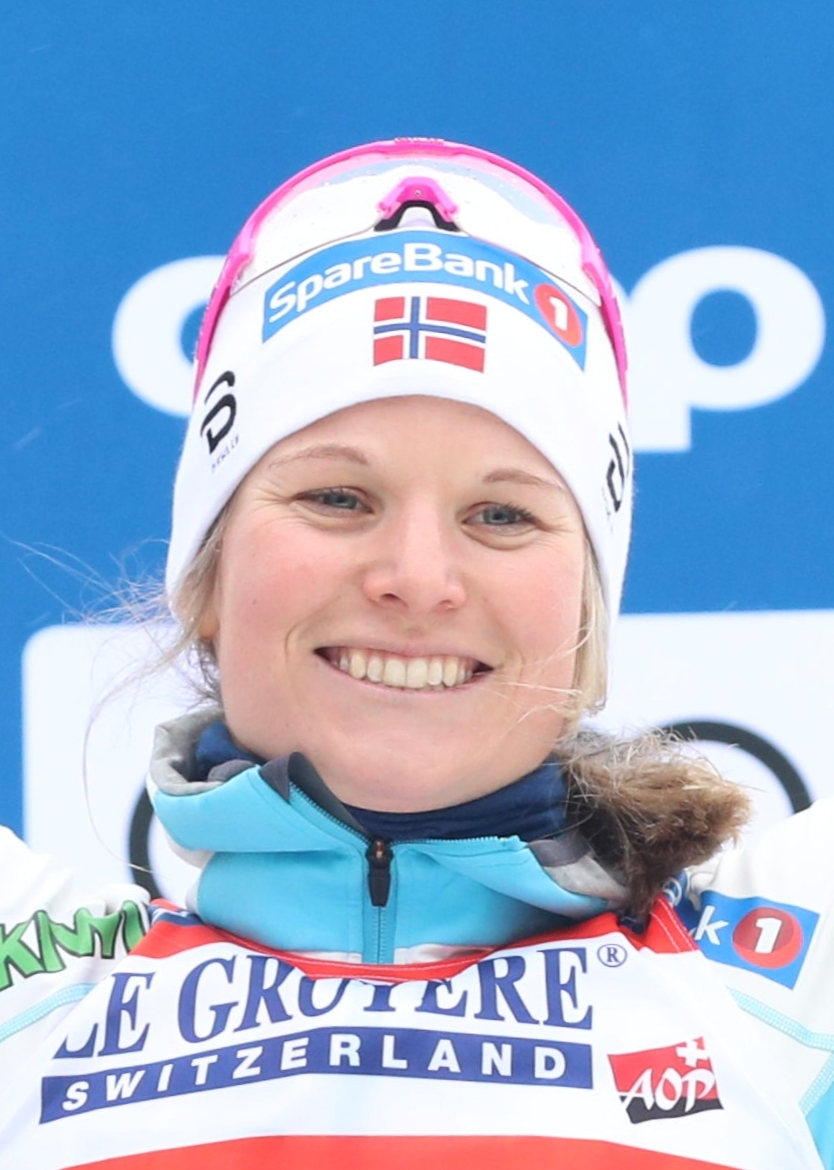
- Eide at the FIS Cross-Country World Cup Dresden 2019

Personal information
- Nationality: Norway
- Born: 18 November 1989 (age 36) Beitostølen, Norway
- Height: 1.73 m (5 ft 8 in)

Sport
- Sport: Skiing
- Club: Øystre Slidre IL

World Cup career
- Seasons: 11 – (2010–2020)
- Indiv. starts: 70
- Indiv. podiums: 0
- Team starts: 8
- Team podiums: 2
- Team wins: 1
- Overall titles: 0 – (44th in 2018)
- Discipline titles: 0
Medal record
Women's cross-country skiing
Representing Norway
World Championships
Bronze medal – third place	2019 Seefeld	Individual sprint
- Updated on 2 November 2021

Mari Eide (born 18 November 1989) is a retired cross-country skier from Norway. She has competed in the World Cup since the 2010 season. She was selected to participate in the 2018 Winter Olympics. She is the younger sister of former cross-country skier Ida Eide, who died of cardiac arrest during a foot race in Jessheim, 2 September 2018.

She announced her retirement from cross-country skiing in February 2021.

== Cross-country skiing results ==
All results are sourced from the International Ski Federation (FIS).

=== World Championships ===
- 1 medal – (1 bronze)

Year	Age	10 km individual	15 km skiathlon	30 km mass start	Sprint	4 × 5 km relay	Team sprint
2019	29	—	—	—	Bronze	—	—

=== World Cup ===
==== Season standings ====
Season	Age	Discipline standings			Ski Tour standings				
Season	Age	Overall	Distance	Sprint	Nordic Opening	Tour de Ski	Ski Tour 2020	World Cup Final	Ski Tour Canada
2010	20	NC	—	NC	—N/a	—	—N/a	—	—N/a
2011	21	70	—	46	—	—	—N/a	—	—N/a
2012	22	56	NC	30	—	—	—N/a	—	—N/a
2013	23	114	NC	73	—	—	—N/a	—	—N/a
2014	24	101	NC	65	—	—	—N/a	—	—N/a
2015	25	92	NC	49	DNF	—	—N/a	—N/a	—N/a
2016	26	45	60	26	—	—	—N/a	—N/a	—
2017	27	48	NC	19	40	—	—N/a	—	—N/a
2018	28	44	51	31	16	DNF	—N/a	—	—N/a
2019	29	50	63	32	—	DNF	—N/a	27	—N/a
2020	30	64	NC	38	DNF	—	—	—N/a	—N/a

==== Team podiums ====
- 1 victory – (1 TS)
- 2 podiums – (2 TS)

No.	Season	Date	Location	Race	Level	Place	Teammate
1	2011–12	4 December 2011	Düsseldorf, Germany	6 × 0.9 km Team Sprint F	World Cup	1st	Falla
2	2018–19	13 January 2019	Dresden, Germany	6 × 1.6 km Team Sprint F	World Cup	3rd	Falla
