= FIS Cross-Country World Cup Finals =

Annual cross-country skiing event

Race details
- Date: Mid-March
- Venue(s): Various
- Competition: FIS Cross-Country World Cup
- Type: Mini-tour
- Organiser: International Ski Federation

History
- First edition: 14 March 2008; 17 years ago
- Editions: 11 (as of 2019)

Men
- First winner: Vincent Vittoz (FRA)
- Most wins: Petter Northug (NOR) (3 wins)
- Most recent: Johannes Høsflot Klæbo (NOR)

Ladies
- First winner: Virpi Kuitunen (FIN)
- Most wins: Marit Bjørgen (NOR) (6 wins)
- Most recent: Stina Nilsson (SWE)

The FIS Cross-Country World Cup Finals is a cross-country skiing event held annually since the 2007–08 season in various places in Europe or Canada. The World Cup Finals is a Stage World Cup event in the FIS Cross-Country World Cup, and is held as the last World Cup race weekend of the season. The inaugural World Cup Finals was held in 2008 in Bormio, Italy. As of the 2018–19 season, the World Cup Finals consists of three stages; a sprint, a mass start race and a pursuit.

The first stages was arranged on 14 March 2008 and were won by Claudia Künzel (ladies) and Pietro Piller Cottrer (men). The first overall winners of the World Cup Finals were Virpi Kuitunen and Vincent Vittoz.

== Venues ==
Year	Venue
2008	(Italy) Bormio
2009	(Sweden) Stockholm and Falun
2010	(Sweden) Stockholm and Falun
2011	(Sweden) Stockholm and Falun
2012	(Sweden) Stockholm and Falun
2013	(Sweden) Stockholm and Falun
2014	(Sweden) Falun
2015	not arranged
2016	(Canada) Gatineau, Montreal, Quebec City, Canmore and Lake Louise
2017	(Canada) Quebec City
2018	(Sweden) Falun
2019	(Canada) Quebec City
2020	~~Canmore~~ Cancelled due to the COVID-19 pandemic in Canada
2021	~~Beijing~~ Cancelled due to the COVID-19 pandemic in China
2022	(Russia) Tyumen

== Prize money ==
As of the 2018–19 edition, a total of CHF 240,000, both genders included, is awarded in cash prizes in the race. The overall winners of the World Cup Finals receive CHF 22,500, with the second and third placed skiers getting CHF 17,500 and CHF 11,000 respectively. All finishers in the top 20 are awarded money. CHF 5,000 is given to the winners of each stage of the race, with smaller amounts given to places 2 and 3.

== Overall winners ==
=== Men ===
Year	Winner	Second	Third
2008	(France) Vincent Vittoz	(Czech Republic) Lukáš Bauer	(Italy) Giorgio Di Centa
2009	(Switzerland) Dario Cologna	(France) Vincent Vittoz	(Russia) Alexander Legkov
2010	(Norway) Petter Northug	(France) Maurice Manificat	(Sweden) Marcus Hellner
2011	(Norway) Petter Northug	(Norway) Finn Hågen Krogh	(Switzerland) Dario Cologna
2012	(Switzerland) Dario Cologna	(Canada) Devon Kershaw	(Norway) Niklas Dyrhaug
2013	(Norway) Petter Northug	(Norway) Finn Hågen Krogh	(Norway) Martin Johnsrud Sundby
2014	(Norway) Martin Johnsrud Sundby	(Canada) Alex Harvey	(Russia) Alexander Legkov
2015	not arranged		
2016	(Norway) Martin Johnsrud Sundby	(Russia) Sergey Ustiugov	(Norway) Petter Northug
2017	(Norway) Johannes Høsflot Klæbo	(Canada) Alex Harvey	(Norway) Niklas Dyrhaug
2018	(Russia) Alexander Bolshunov	(Canada) Alex Harvey	(Switzerland) Dario Cologna
2019	(Norway) Johannes Høsflot Klæbo	(Canada) Alex Harvey	(Russia) Alexander Bolshunov
2020	Cancelled due to the COVID-19 pandemic in Canada		
2021	Cancelled due to the COVID-19 pandemic in China		

=== Women ===
Year	Winner	Second	Third
2008	(Finland) Virpi Kuitunen	(Poland) Justyna Kowalczyk	(Germany) Claudia Künzel
2009	(Poland) Justyna Kowalczyk	(Norway) Therese Johaug	(Sweden) Charlotte Kalla
2010	(Norway) Marit Bjørgen	(Poland) Justyna Kowalczyk	(Sweden) Charlotte Kalla
2011	(Norway) Marit Bjørgen	(Poland) Justyna Kowalczyk	(Norway) Therese Johaug
2012	(Norway) Marit Bjørgen	(Norway) Heidi Weng	(Sweden) Charlotte Kalla
2013	(Norway) Marit Bjørgen	(Norway) Therese Johaug	(Sweden) Charlotte Kalla
2014	(Norway) Therese Johaug	(Norway) Marit Bjørgen	(Norway) Heidi Weng
2015	not arranged		
2016	(Norway) Therese Johaug	(Norway) Heidi Weng	(Norway) Ingvild Flugstad Østberg
2017	(Norway) Marit Bjørgen	(Norway) Heidi Weng	(Sweden) Stina Nilsson
2018	(Norway) Marit Bjørgen	(United States) Jessie Diggins	(United States) Sadie Bjornsen
2019	(Sweden) Stina Nilsson	(Norway) Therese Johaug	(Norway) Ingvild Flugstad Østberg
2020	Cancelled due to the COVID-19 pandemic in Canada		
2021	Cancelled due to the COVID-19 pandemic in China		

== Records ==
=== Overall winners ===
Six skiers have won the World Cup Finals two or more times. Marit Bjørgen (NOR) is the only skier to win six times. Petter Northug (NOR) has won the World Cup Finals three times.

Men
Wins	Skier	Editions
3	Petter Northug (NOR)	2010, 2011, 2013
2	Dario Cologna (SUI)	2009, 2012
2	Martin Johnsrud Sundby (NOR)	2014, 2016
2	Johannes Høsflot Klæbo (NOR)	2017, 2019
1	Vincent Vittoz (FRA)	2008
1	Alexander Bolshunov (RUS)	2018

Women
Wins	Skier	Editions
6	Marit Bjørgen (NOR)	2010, 2011, 2012, 2013, 2017, 2018
2	Therese Johaug (NOR)	2014, 2016
1	Virpi Kuitunen (FIN)	2008
1	Justyna Kowalczyk (POL)	2009
1	Stina Nilsson (SWE)	2019

== World Cup points ==
The overall winner are awarded 200 points. The winners of each of the three stages are awarded 50 points. The maximum number of points an athlete can earn is therefore 350 points.

Position	1	2	3	4	5	6	7	8	9	10	11	12	13	14	15	16	17	18	19	20	21	22	23	24	25	26	27	28	29	30
Overall	200	160	120	100	90	80	72	64	58	52	48	44	40	36	32	30	28	26	24	22	20	18	16	14	12	10	8	6	4	2
Stage	50	46	43	40	37	34	32	30	28	26	24	22	20	18	16	15	14	13	12	11	10	9	8	7	6	5	4	3	2	1

== Sources ==
- Rules for the FIS Cross-Country World Cup (PDF). International Ski Federation (FIS). 2018.
