= Daniel Stock =

Norwegian cross-country skier

Personal information
- Nationality: Norway
- Born: September 16, 1992 (age 33)

Sport
- Sport: Skiing
- Club: Vadsø SK

World Cup career
- Seasons: 8 – (2014–2021)
- Indiv. starts: 16
- Indiv. podiums: 1
- Indiv. wins: 0
- Team starts: 1
- Team podiums: 0
- Overall titles: 0 – (37th in 2017)
- Discipline titles: 0
Medal record
Men's cross-country skiing
Representing Norway
U23 World Championships
Bronze medal – third place	2014 Val di Fiemme	30 km skiathlon
- Updated on 24 December 2021

Daniel Stock (born 16 September 1992) is a Norwegian cross-country skier.

He competed at the 2012 Junior World Championships, later in the U23 age class at the 2014 Junior World Championships where he won the bronze medal in the 30 km skiathlon.

He made his World Cup debut in March 2014 in the Holmenkollen 50 km race, collecting his first World Cup points in the 2015 edition of the same race with a 25th place. In January 2017 in Ulricehamn he finished fifth in the 15 km race, and in February 2017 in Pyeongchang, South Korea, he finished second in the 30 km skiathlon.

He represents the sports club Vadsø SK.

== Cross-country skiing results ==
All results are sourced from the International Ski Federation (FIS).

=== World Cup ===
==== Season standings ====
Season	Age	Discipline standings			Ski Tour standings				
Season	Age	Overall	Distance	Sprint	Nordic Opening	Tour de Ski	Ski Tour 2020	World Cup Final	Ski Tour Canada
2014	21	NC	NC	—	—	—	—N/a	—	—N/a
2015	22	141	85	—	—	—	—N/a	—N/a	—N/a
2016	23	143	92	—	—	—	—N/a	—N/a	—
2017	24	37	23	102	—	—	—N/a	—	—N/a
2018	25	119	80	—	—	—	—N/a	—	—N/a
2019	26	70	44	—	—	—	—N/a	—	—N/a
2020	27	119	71	—	—	—	—	—N/a	—N/a
2021	28	82	59	—	—	—	—N/a	—N/a	—N/a

==== Individual podiums ====
- 1 podium – (1 WC)

No.	Season	Date	Location	Race	Level	Place
1	2016–17	4 February 2017	Pyeongchang, South Korea	15 km + 15 km Skiathlon C/F	World Cup	2nd
