= 2016–17 FIS Cross-Country World Cup =

Cross-country skiing competition

Discipline	Men	Women
Overall	(Norway) Martin Johnsrud Sundby (3rd title)	(Norway) Heidi Weng
Distance	(Norway) Martin Johnsrud Sundby	(Norway) Heidi Weng
Sprint	(Norway) Johannes Høsflot Klæbo	(Norway) Maiken Caspersen Falla
U-23	(Norway) Johannes Høsflot Klæbo	(Slovenia) Anamarija Lampič
Nations Cup	Norway	Norway
- Nations Cup Overall: Norway

Stage events
Nordic Opening	(Norway) Martin Johnsrud Sundby	(Norway) Heidi Weng
Tour de Ski	(Russia) Sergey Ustiugov	(Norway) Heidi Weng
World Cup Final	(Norway) Johannes Høsflot Klæbo	(Norway) Marit Bjørgen

Competition
Locations	16 venues	16 venues
Individual	28 events	28 events
Relay/Team	4 events	4 events

The 2016–17 FIS Cross-Country World Cup was the 36th official World Cup season in cross-country skiing for men and women. The season started on 26 November 2016 in Ruka, Finland, and ended on 19 March 2017 in Quebec City, Canada.

== Calendar ==
=== Men ===
C – Classic / F – Freestyle
WC	Stage	Date	Place	Discipline	Winner	Second	Third	Yellow bib	Ref.
1	1	26 November 2016	(Finland) Ruka	Sprint C	(Norway) Pål Golberg	(Sweden) Calle Halfvarsson	(Norway) Johannes Høsflot Klæbo	(Norway) Pål Golberg	
2	2	27 November 2016	(Finland) Ruka	15 km C	(Finland) Iivo Niskanen	(Norway) Emil Iversen	(Norway) Martin Johnsrud Sundby	(Sweden) Calle Halfvarsson	
	3	2 December 2016	(Norway) Lillehammer	Sprint C	(Sweden) Calle Halfvarsson	(Norway) Emil Iversen	(Sweden) Teodor Peterson	(Sweden) Calle Halfvarsson	
	4	3 December 2016	(Norway) Lillehammer	10 km F	(Sweden) Calle Halfvarsson	(Sweden) Marcus Hellner	(Russia) Sergey Ustiugov	(Sweden) Calle Halfvarsson	
	5	4 December 2016	(Norway) Lillehammer	15 km pursuit C	(Finland) Matti Heikkinen	(Norway) Martin Johnsrud Sundby	(Norway) Pål Golberg	(Sweden) Calle Halfvarsson	
3	7th Nordic Opening Overall (2–4 December 2016)				(Norway) Martin Johnsrud Sundby	(Norway) Johannes Høsflot Klæbo	(Finland) Matti Heikkinen	(Norway) Martin Johnsrud Sundby	
4	6	10 December 2016	(Switzerland) Davos	30 km F	(Norway) Martin Johnsrud Sundby	(Norway) Anders Gløersen	(Finland) Matti Heikkinen	(Norway) Martin Johnsrud Sundby	
5	7	11 December 2016	(Switzerland) Davos	Sprint F	(Russia) Sergey Ustiugov	(Norway) Finn Hågen Krogh	(Norway) Sindre Bjørnestad Skar	(Norway) Martin Johnsrud Sundby	
6	8	17 December 2016	(France) La Clusaz	15 km mass start F	(Norway) Finn Hågen Krogh	(Norway) Martin Johnsrud Sundby	(Russia) Alexander Legkov	(Norway) Martin Johnsrud Sundby	
	9	31 December 2016	(Switzerland) Val Müstair	Sprint F	(Russia) Sergey Ustiugov	(Italy) Federico Pellegrino	(Norway) Finn Hågen Krogh	(Norway) Martin Johnsrud Sundby	
	10	1 January 2017	(Switzerland) Val Müstair	10 km mass start C	(Russia) Sergey Ustiugov	(Norway) Martin Johnsrud Sundby	(Norway) Didrik Tønseth	(Norway) Martin Johnsrud Sundby	
	11	3 January 2017	(Germany) Oberstdorf	20 km skiathlon	(Russia) Sergey Ustiugov	(Norway) Martin Johnsrud Sundby	(Switzerland) Dario Cologna	(Norway) Martin Johnsrud Sundby	
	12	4 January 2017	(Germany) Oberstdorf	15 km pursuit F	(Russia) Sergey Ustiugov	(Norway) Martin Johnsrud Sundby	(Canada) Alex Harvey	(Norway) Martin Johnsrud Sundby	
	13	6 January 2017	(Italy) Toblach	10 km F	(Russia) Sergey Ustiugov	(France) Maurice Manificat	(Norway) Simen Hegstad Krüger	(Norway) Martin Johnsrud Sundby	
	14	7 January 2017	(Italy) Val di Fiemme	15 km mass start C	(Norway) Martin Johnsrud Sundby	(Russia) Sergey Ustiugov	(Finland) Matti Heikkinen	(Norway) Martin Johnsrud Sundby	
	15	8 January 2017	(Italy) Val di Fiemme	9 km pursuit climb F	(France) Maurice Manificat	(Finland) Matti Heikkinen	(Norway) Hans Christer Holund	(Norway) Martin Johnsrud Sundby	
7	11th Tour de Ski Overall (31 December 2016 – 8 January 2017)				(Russia) Sergey Ustiugov	(Norway) Martin Johnsrud Sundby	(Switzerland) Dario Cologna	(Norway) Martin Johnsrud Sundby	
8	16	14 January 2017	(Italy) Toblach	Sprint F	(Norway) Sindre Bjørnestad Skar	(United States) Simeon Hamilton	(Norway) Johannes Høsflot Klæbo	(Norway) Martin Johnsrud Sundby	
9	17	21 January 2017	(Sweden) Ulricehamn	15 km F	(Canada) Alex Harvey	(Norway) Martin Johnsrud Sundby	(Sweden) Marcus Hellner	(Norway) Martin Johnsrud Sundby	
10	18	28 January 2017	(Sweden) Falun	Sprint F	(Italy) Federico Pellegrino	(Norway) Emil Iversen	(Norway) Sindre Bjørnestad Skar	(Norway) Martin Johnsrud Sundby	
11	19	29 January 2017	(Sweden) Falun	30 km mass start C	(Norway) Emil Iversen	(Norway) Martin Johnsrud Sundby	(Sweden) Calle Halfvarsson	(Norway) Martin Johnsrud Sundby	
12	20	3 February 2017	(South Korea) Pyeongchang	Sprint C	(Russia) Gleb Retivykh	(Norway) Sondre Turvoll Fossli	(Russia) Andrey Parfenov	(Norway) Martin Johnsrud Sundby	
13	21	4 February 2017	(South Korea) Pyeongchang	30 km skiathlon	(Russia) Petr Sedov	(Norway) Daniel Stock	(Norway) Mathias Rundgreen	(Norway) Martin Johnsrud Sundby	
14	22	18 February 2017	(Estonia) Otepää	Sprint F	(Norway) Johannes Høsflot Klæbo	(Norway) Finn Hågen Krogh	(Russia) Sergey Ustiugov	(Norway) Martin Johnsrud Sundby	
15	23	19 February 2017	(Estonia) Otepää	15 km C	(Norway) Martin Johnsrud Sundby	(Finland) Iivo Niskanen	(Norway) Hans Christer Holund	(Norway) Martin Johnsrud Sundby	
FIS Nordic World Ski Championships 2017 (22 February–5 March)
16	24	8 March 2017	(Norway) Drammen	Sprint C	(Norway) Eirik Brandsdal	(Norway) Johannes Høsflot Klæbo	(Russia) Sergey Ustiugov	(Norway) Martin Johnsrud Sundby	
17	25	11 March 2017	(Norway) Oslo	50 km mass start C	(Norway) Martin Johnsrud Sundby	(Finland) Iivo Niskanen	(Russia) Alexander Bessmertnykh	(Norway) Martin Johnsrud Sundby	
	26	17 March 2017	(Canada) Quebec City	Sprint F	(Canada) Alex Harvey	(Norway) Finn Hågen Krogh	(France) Richard Jouve	(Norway) Martin Johnsrud Sundby	
	27	18 March 2017	(Canada) Quebec City	15 km mass start C	(Norway) Johannes Høsflot Klæbo	(Norway) Niklas Dyrhaug	(Russia) Alexander Bessmertnykh	(Norway) Martin Johnsrud Sundby	
	28	19 March 2017	(Canada) Quebec City	15 km pursuit F	(Sweden) Marcus Hellner	(United Kingdom) Andrew Musgrave	(Norway) Sjur Røthe	(Norway) Martin Johnsrud Sundby	
18	2016–17 World Cup Final (17–19 March 2017)				(Norway) Johannes Høsflot Klæbo	(Canada) Alex Harvey	(Norway) Niklas Dyrhaug	(Norway) Martin Johnsrud Sundby	

=== Women ===
WC	Stage	Date	Place	Discipline	Winner	Second	Third	Yellow bib	Ref.
1	1	26 November 2016	(Finland) Ruka	Sprint C	(Sweden) Stina Nilsson	(Norway) Maiken Caspersen Falla	(Norway) Heidi Weng	(Sweden) Stina Nilsson	
2	2	27 November 2016	(Finland) Ruka	10 km C	(Norway) Marit Bjørgen	(Finland) Krista Pärmäkoski	(Norway) Heidi Weng	(Sweden) Stina Nilsson	
	3	2 December 2016	(Norway) Lillehammer	Sprint C	(Norway) Heidi Weng	(Norway) Maiken Caspersen Falla	(Sweden) Hanna Falk	(Norway) Heidi Weng	
	4	3 December 2016	(Norway) Lillehammer	5 km F	(United States) Jessie Diggins	(Norway) Heidi Weng	(Norway) Marit Bjørgen	(Norway) Heidi Weng	
	5	4 December 2016	(Norway) Lillehammer	10 km pursuit C	(Finland) Krista Pärmäkoski	(Norway) Ingvild Flugstad Østberg	(Norway) Heidi Weng	(Norway) Heidi Weng	
3	7th Nordic Opening Overall (2–4 December 2016)				(Norway) Heidi Weng	(Norway) Ingvild Flugstad Østberg	(Finland) Krista Pärmäkoski	(Norway) Heidi Weng	
4	6	10 December 2016	(Switzerland) Davos	15 km F	(Norway) Ingvild Flugstad Østberg	(Norway) Heidi Weng	(Finland) Krista Pärmäkoski	(Norway) Heidi Weng	
5	7	11 December 2016	(Switzerland) Davos	Sprint F	(Norway) Maiken Caspersen Falla	(Norway) Ingvild Flugstad Østberg	(Sweden) Hanna Falk	(Norway) Ingvild Flugstad Østberg	
6	8	17 December 2016	(France) La Clusaz	10 km mass start F	(Norway) Heidi Weng	(Norway) Marit Bjørgen	(Norway) Ingvild Flugstad Østberg	(Norway) Heidi Weng	
	9	31 December 2016	(Switzerland) Val Müstair	Sprint F	(Sweden) Stina Nilsson	(Norway) Maiken Caspersen Falla	(Norway) Heidi Weng	(Norway) Heidi Weng	
	10	1 January 2017	(Switzerland) Val Müstair	5 km mass start C	(Norway) Ingvild Flugstad Østberg	(Norway) Heidi Weng	(Finland) Krista Pärmäkoski	(Norway) Heidi Weng	
	11	3 January 2017	(Germany) Oberstdorf	10 km skiathlon	(Sweden) Stina Nilsson	(United States) Jessie Diggins	(Norway) Heidi Weng	(Norway) Heidi Weng	
	12	4 January 2017	(Germany) Oberstdorf	10 km pursuit F	(Sweden) Stina Nilsson	(Norway) Heidi Weng	(Norway) Ingvild Flugstad Østberg	(Norway) Heidi Weng	
	13	6 January 2017	(Italy) Toblach	5 km F	(United States) Jessie Diggins	(Finland) Krista Pärmäkoski	(United States) Sadie Bjornsen	(Norway) Heidi Weng	
	14	7 January 2017	(Italy) Val di Fiemme	10 km mass start C	(Sweden) Stina Nilsson	(Finland) Anne Kyllönen	(Sweden) Charlotte Kalla	(Norway) Heidi Weng	
	15	8 January 2017	(Italy) Val di Fiemme	9 km pursuit climb F	(Norway) Heidi Weng	(United States) Elizabeth Stephen	(Finland) Kerttu Niskanen	(Norway) Heidi Weng	
7	11th Tour de Ski Overall (31 December 2016 – 8 January 2017)				(Norway) Heidi Weng	(Finland) Krista Pärmäkoski	(Sweden) Stina Nilsson	(Norway) Heidi Weng	
8	16	14 January 2017	(Italy) Toblach	Sprint F	(Russia) Natalya Matveyeva	(Norway) Maiken Caspersen Falla	(Sweden) Hanna Falk	(Norway) Heidi Weng	
9	17	21 January 2017	(Sweden) Ulricehamn	10 km F	(Norway) Marit Bjørgen	(Finland) Krista Pärmäkoski	(Sweden) Charlotte Kalla	(Norway) Heidi Weng	
10	18	28 January 2017	(Sweden) Falun	Sprint F	(Sweden) Stina Nilsson	(Norway) Maiken Caspersen Falla	(Norway) Heidi Weng	(Norway) Heidi Weng	
11	19	29 January 2017	(Sweden) Falun	15 km mass start C	(Norway) Marit Bjørgen	(Norway) Ingvild Flugstad Østberg	(Norway) Heidi Weng	(Norway) Heidi Weng	
12	20	3 February 2017	(South Korea) Pyeongchang	Sprint C	(Slovenia) Anamarija Lampič	(Norway) Silje Øyre Slind	(United States) Ida Sargent	(Norway) Heidi Weng	
13	21	4 February 2017	(South Korea) Pyeongchang	15 km skiathlon	(Poland) Justyna Kowalczyk	(United States) Elizabeth Stephen	(Japan) Masako Ishida	(Norway) Heidi Weng	
14	22	18 February 2017	(Estonia) Otepää	Sprint F	(Sweden) Stina Nilsson	(Norway) Maiken Caspersen Falla	(Norway) Heidi Weng	(Norway) Heidi Weng	
15	23	19 February 2017	(Estonia) Otepää	10 km C	(Norway) Marit Bjørgen	(Sweden) Charlotte Kalla	(Norway) Heidi Weng	(Norway) Heidi Weng	
FIS Nordic World Ski Championships 2017 (22 February–5 March)
16	24	8 March 2017	(Norway) Drammen	Sprint C	(Sweden) Stina Nilsson	(Finland) Krista Pärmäkoski	(Sweden) Hanna Falk	(Norway) Heidi Weng	
17	25	12 March 2017	(Norway) Oslo	30 km mass start C	(Norway) Marit Bjørgen	(Finland) Krista Pärmäkoski	(Finland) Kerttu Niskanen	(Norway) Heidi Weng	
	26	17 March 2017	(Canada) Quebec City	Sprint F	(Sweden) Stina Nilsson	(Norway) Maiken Caspersen Falla	(Sweden) Hanna Falk	(Norway) Heidi Weng	
	27	18 March 2017	(Canada) Quebec City	10 km mass start C	(Norway) Marit Bjørgen	(Norway) Heidi Weng	(Finland) Krista Pärmäkoski	(Norway) Heidi Weng	
	28	19 March 2017	(Canada) Quebec City	10 km pursuit F	(Norway) Marit Bjørgen	(Norway) Heidi Weng	(Sweden) Stina Nilsson	(Norway) Heidi Weng	
18	2016–17 World Cup Final (17–19 March 2017)				(Norway) Marit Bjørgen	(Norway) Heidi Weng	(Sweden) Stina Nilsson	(Norway) Heidi Weng	

=== Men's team ===
WC	Stage	Date	Place	Discipline	Winner	Second	Third	Ref.
1	1	18 December 2016	(France) La Clusaz	4 x 7.5 km relay C/F	Norway Didrik Tønseth; Martin Johnsrud Sundby; Anders Gløersen; Finn Hågen Krogh	Russia I Evgeniy Belov; Alexander Legkov; Aleksey Chervotkin; Sergey Ustiugov	France I Jean-Marc Gaillard; Alexis Jeannerod; Clément Parisse; Maurice Manificat	
2	2	15 January 2017	(Italy) Toblach	Team sprint F	Canada Len Väljas; Alex Harvey	Sweden I Karl-Johan Westberg; Oskar Svensson	Italy I Dietmar Nöckler; Federico Pellegrino	
3	3	22 January 2017	(Sweden) Ulricehamn	4 x 7.5 km relay C/F	Norway I Simen Hegstad Krüger; Martin Johnsrud Sundby; Anders Gløersen; Finn Hågen Krogh	Sweden I Daniel Rickardsson; Johan Olsson; Marcus Hellner; Calle Halfvarsson	Canada Devon Kershaw; Alex Harvey; Knute Johnsgaard; Len Väljas	
4	4	5 February 2017	(South Korea) Pyeongchang	Team sprint F	Russia I Andrey Parfenov; Gleb Retivykh	France Baptiste Gros; Lucas Chanavat	Russia II Artem Maltsev; Nikita Kryukov	

=== Women's team ===
WC	Stage	Date	Place	Discipline	Winner	Second	Third	Ref.
1	1	18 December 2016	(France) La Clusaz	4 x 5 km relay C/F	Norway Ingvild Flugstad Østberg; Marit Bjørgen; Ragnhild Haga; Heidi Weng	Finland Aino-Kaisa Saarinen; Anne Kyllönen; Riitta-Liisa Roponen; Laura Mononen	Sweden Emma Wikén; Stina Nilsson; Maria Rydqvist; Anna Dyvik	
2	2	15 January 2017	(Italy) Toblach	Team sprint F	Russia I Yuliya Belorukova; Natalya Matveyeva	Sweden I Ida Ingemarsdotter; Hanna Falk	Norway I Astrid Uhrenholdt Jacobsen; Maiken Caspersen Falla	
3	3	22 January 2017	(Sweden) Ulricehamn	4 x 5 km relay C/F	Norway I Ingvild Flugstad Østberg; Heidi Weng; Astrid Uhrenholdt Jacobsen; Marit Bjørgen	Germany Katharina Hennig; Stefanie Böhler; Victoria Carl; Sandra Ringwald	Sweden I Ida Ingemarsdotter; Sofia Henriksson; Charlotte Kalla; Hanna Falk	
4	4	5 February 2017	(South Korea) Pyeongchang	Team sprint F	Sweden I Elin Mohlin; Maria Nordström	Norway I Anna Svendsen; Silje Øyre Slind	United States I Sophie Caldwell; Ida Sargent	

== Men's standings ==
=== Overall ===
Rank	after 28 events	Points
1	(Norway) Martin Johnsrud Sundby	1626
2	(Russia) Sergey Ustiugov	1176
3	(Canada) Alex Harvey	1128
4	(Norway) Johannes Høsflot Klæbo	884
5	(Finland) Matti Heikkinen	869
6	(Sweden) Marcus Hellner	815
7	(Switzerland) Dario Cologna	788
8	(Norway) Niklas Dyrhaug	758
9	(Norway) Sjur Røthe	673
10	(Norway) Finn Hågen Krogh	660

=== Distance ===
Rank	after 18 events	Points
1	(Norway) Martin Johnsrud Sundby	1056
2	(Canada) Alex Harvey	588
3	(Finland) Matti Heikkinen	555
4	(Finland) Iivo Niskanen	475
5	(Norway) Niklas Dyrhaug	468
6	(Norway) Sjur Røthe	465
7	(Russia) Sergey Ustiugov	454
8	(Sweden) Marcus Hellner	453
9	(Switzerland) Dario Cologna	424
10	(Norway) Hans Christer Holund	409

=== Sprint ===
Rank	after 10 events	Points
1	(Norway) Johannes Høsflot Klæbo	399
2	(Italy) Federico Pellegrino	363
3	(Norway) Sindre Bjørnestad Skar	338
4	(Norway) Finn Hågen Krogh	323
5	(Russia) Sergey Ustiugov	322
6	(Norway) Pål Golberg	238
7	(Norway) Emil Iversen	237
8	(France) Lucas Chanavat	216
9	(United States) Simeon Hamilton	200
10	(Norway) Eirik Brandsdal	199

=== Prize money ===
Rank	after 44 payouts	CHF
1	(Norway) Martin Johnsrud Sundby	215,850
2	(Russia) Sergey Ustiugov	171,875
3	(Norway) Johannes Høsflot Klæbo	117,749
4	(Canada) Alex Harvey	74,250
5	(Norway) Finn Hågen Krogh	51,187
6	(Norway) Emil Iversen	48,625
7	(Finland) Matti Heikkinen	47,275
8	(Switzerland) Dario Cologna	41,125
9	(Norway) Sindre Bjørnestad Skar	37,375
10	(Finland) Iivo Niskanen	37,313

=== Helvetia U23 ===
Rank	after 28 events	Points
1	(Norway) Johannes Høsflot Klæbo	884
2	(Sweden) Jens Burman	252
3	(France) Lucas Chanavat	216
4	(Sweden) Oskar Svensson	143
5	(France) Richard Jouve	100
6	(Russia) Aleksey Chervotkin	51
7	(Sweden) Viktor Thorn	34
8	(Russia) Alexander Bolshunov	29
9	(Slovenia) Janez Lampič	24
10	(Russia) Pavel Petrov	24

=== Audi Quattro Bonus Ranking ===
Rank	after 12 events	Points
1	(Norway) Martin Johnsrud Sundby	286
2	(Russia) Sergey Ustiugov	211
3	(Canada) Alex Harvey	163
4	(Norway) Niklas Dyrhaug	118
5	(Norway) Finn Hågen Krogh	104
6	(Norway) Sjur Røthe	96
7	(Russia) Andrey Larkov	92
8	(Finland) Iivo Niskanen	89
9	(Norway) Emil Iversen	82
10	(Italy) Federico Pellegrino	72

== Women's standings ==
=== Overall ===
Rank	after 28 events	Points
1	(Norway) Heidi Weng	2032
2	(Finland) Krista Pärmäkoski	1618
3	(Norway) Ingvild Flugstad Østberg	1517
4	(Sweden) Stina Nilsson	1437
5	(Norway) Marit Bjørgen	1307
6	(United States) Jessie Diggins	912
7	(Norway) Maiken Caspersen Falla	866
8	(Finland) Kerttu Niskanen	704
9	(Sweden) Charlotte Kalla	660
10	(Finland) Laura Mononen	605

=== Distance ===
Rank	after 18 events	Points
1	(Norway) Heidi Weng	951
2	(Norway) Marit Bjørgen	854
3	(Finland) Krista Pärmäkoski	807
4	(Norway) Ingvild Flugstad Østberg	771
5	(Sweden) Charlotte Kalla	491
6	(Sweden) Stina Nilsson	467
7	(United States) Jessie Diggins	432
8	(Finland) Kerttu Niskanen	417
9	(Finland) Laura Mononen	383
10	(Russia) Yuliya Chekalyova	367

=== Sprint ===
Rank	after 10 events	Points
1	(Norway) Maiken Caspersen Falla	558
2	(Sweden) Stina Nilsson	520
3	(Sweden) Hanna Falk	359
4	(Norway) Heidi Weng	321
5	(Norway) Ingvild Flugstad Østberg	306
6	(Finland) Krista Pärmäkoski	281
7	(Russia) Natalya Matveyeva	242
8	(Sweden) Ida Ingemarsdotter	232
9	(Slovenia) Anamarija Lampič	214
10	(United States) Jessie Diggins	206

=== Prize money ===
Rank	after 44 payouts	CHF
1	(Norway) Heidi Weng	272,350
2	(Sweden) Stina Nilsson	153,375
3	(Finland) Krista Pärmäkoski	153,000
4	(Norway) Marit Bjørgen	150,900
5	(Norway) Ingvild Flugstad Østberg	122,750
6	(Norway) Maiken Caspersen Falla	70,500
7	(United States) Jessie Diggins	39,062
8	(Slovenia) Anamarija Lampič	27,499
9	(Russia) Natalya Matveyeva	27,000
10	(Sweden) Hanna Falk	26,750

=== Helvetia U23 ===
Rank	after 28 events	Points
1	(Slovenia) Anamarija Lampič	242
2	(Russia) Yuliya Belorukova	201
3	(Switzerland) Nadine Fähndrich	172
4	(Sweden) Jonna Sundling	157
5	(Russia) Anastasia Sedova	146
6	(Germany) Katharina Hennig	138
7	(Sweden) Anna Dyvik	96
8	(Russia) Alisa Zhambalova	91
9	(Germany) Victoria Carl	80
10	(Norway) Lotta Udnes Weng	64

=== Audi Quattro Bonus Ranking ===
Rank	after 12 events	Points
1	(Norway) Heidi Weng	219
2	(Sweden) Stina Nilsson	196
3	(Norway) Ingvild Flugstad Østberg	162
4	(Norway) Marit Bjørgen	140
5	(Finland) Krista Pärmäkoski	123
6	(Norway) Maiken Caspersen Falla	106
7	(United States) Jessie Diggins	88
8	(Norway) Kathrine Rolsted Harsem	73
9	(Sweden) Charlotte Kalla	64
10	(Poland) Justyna Kowalczyk	58

== Nations Cup ==
=== Overall ===
Rank	after 66 events	Points
1	Norway	13383
2	Sweden	7053
3	Finland	5817
4	Russia	5711
5	United States	3218
6	Switzerland	2597
7	Germany	2563
8	France	1853
9	Italy	1812
10	Canada	1800

=== Men ===
Rank	after 33 events	Points
1	Norway	6793
2	Russia	3737
3	Sweden	2877
4	Finland	2273
5	France	1791
6	Canada	1714
7	Switzerland	1647
8	Italy	1109
9	Germany	760
10	United States	708

=== Women ===
Rank	after 33 events	Points
1	Norway	6590
2	Sweden	4176
3	Finland	3544
4	United States	2510
5	Russia	1974
6	Germany	1803
7	Switzerland	950
8	Slovenia	709
9	Italy	703
10	Austria	532

== Points distribution ==
The table shows the number of points won in the 2016/17 Cross-Country Skiing World Cup for men and ladies.

Place	1	2	3	4	5	6	7	8	9	10	11	12	13	14	15	16	17	18	19	20	21	22	23	24	25	26	27	28	29	30
Individual	100	80	60	50	45	40	36	32	29	26	24	22	20	18	16	15	14	13	12	11	10	9	8	7	6	5	4	3	2	1
Team sprint	100	80	60	50	45	40	36	32	29	26	24	22	20	18	16	15	14	13	12	11	10	9	8	7	6	5	4	3	2	1
Nordic Opening	200	160	120	100	90	80	72	64	58	52	48	44	40	36	32	30	28	26	24	22	20	18	16	14	12	10	8	6	4	2
World Cup Final	200	160	120	100	90	80	72	64	58	52	48	44	40	36	32	30	28	26	24	22	20	18	16	14	12	10	8	6	4	2
Relay	200	160	120	100	90	80	72	64	58	52	48	44	40	36	32	30	28	26	24	22	20	18	16	14	12	10	8	6	4	2
Tour de Ski	400	320	240	200	180	160	144	128	116	104	96	88	80	72	64	60	56	52	48	44	40	36	32	28	24	20	16	12	8	4
Stage Nordic Opening	50	46	43	40	37	34	32	30	28	26	24	22	20	18	16	15	14	13	12	11	10	9	8	7	6	5	4	3	2	1
Stage Tour de Ski	50	46	43	40	37	34	32	30	28	26	24	22	20	18	16	15	14	13	12	11	10	9	8	7	6	5	4	3	2	1
Stage World Cup Final	50	46	43	40	37	34	32	30	28	26	24	22	20	18	16	15	14	13	12	11	10	9	8	7	6	5	4	3	2	1
Bonus points	15	12	10	8	6	5	4	3	2	1

== Achievements ==
Only individual events.

First World Cup career victory

Men

- (Norway) Sindre Bjørnestad Skar, 24, in his 7th season – the WC 8 (sprint F) in Toblach; first podium was 2014–15 WC 15 (sprint F) in Lahti
- (Russia) Gleb Retivykh, 25, in his 7th season – the WC 12 (sprint C) in Pyeongchang; also first podium
- (Norway) Johannes Høsflot Klæbo, 20, in his 2nd season - the WC 14 (sprint F) in Otepää; first podium was 2016–17 WC 1 (sprint C) in Ruka

Women

- (Slovenia) Anamarija Lampič, 21, in her 4th season – the WC 12 (sprint C) in Pyeongchang; also first podium

Women

First World Cup podium

Men

- (Norway) Johannes Høsflot Klæbo, 20, in his 2nd season – no. 3 in the WC 1 (sprint C) in Kuusamo
- (Norway) Simen Hegstad Krüger, 23, in his 5th season – no. 3 in the WC 7 (10 km F) in Toblach
- (Russia) Gleb Retivykh, 25, in his 7th season – no. 1 in the WC 12 (sprint C) in Pyeongchang
- (Norway) Daniel Stock, 24, in his 4th season – no. 2 in the WC 13 (30 km skiathlon) in Pyeongchang
- (Norway) Mathias Rundgreen, 25, in his 4th season – no. 3 in the WC 13 (30 km skiathlon) in Pyeongchang

Women

- (United States) Sadie Bjornsen, 27, in her 7th season – no. 3 in the WC 7 (5 km F) in Toblach
- (Slovenia) Anamarija Lampič, 21, in her 4th season – no. 1 in the WC 12 (sprint C) in Pyeongchang
- (Norway) Silje Øyre Slind, 28, in her 6th season – no. 2 in the WC 12 (sprint C) in Pyeongchang
- (United States) Ida Sargent, 29, in her 7th season – no. 3 in the WC 12 (sprint C) in Pyeongchang

Victories in this World Cup (all-time number of victories in parentheses)

Men

- (Russia) Sergey Ustiugov, 7 (11) first places
- (Norway) Martin Johnsrud Sundby, 5 (29) first places
- (Norway) Johannes Høsflot Klæbo, 3 (3) first places
- (Canada) Alex Harvey, 2 (6) first places
- (Sweden) Calle Halfvarsson, 2 (3) first places
- (Italy) Federico Pellegrino, 1 (9) first place
- (Norway) Eirik Brandsdal, 1 (9) first place
- (Norway) Finn Hågen Krogh, 1 (8) first place
- (France) Maurice Manificat, 1 (7) first place
- (Sweden) Marcus Hellner, 1 (5) first place
- (Norway) Pål Golberg, 1 (4) first place
- (Finland) Matti Heikkinen, 1 (4) first place
- (Norway) Emil Iversen, 1 (4) first place
- (Finland) Iivo Niskanen, 1 (2) first place
- (Russia) Petr Sedov, 1 (2) first place
- (Norway) Sindre Bjørnestad Skar, 1 (1) first place
- (Russia) Gleb Retivykh, 1 (1) first place

Women

- (Sweden) Stina Nilsson, 9 (12) first places
- (Norway) Marit Bjørgen, 8 (110) first places
- (Norway) Heidi Weng, 5 (8) first places
- (Norway) Ingvild Flugstad Østberg, 2 (7) first places
- (United States) Jessie Diggins, 2 (3) first places
- (Poland) Justyna Kowalczyk, 1 (50) first place
- (Norway) Maiken Caspersen Falla, 1 (13) first place
- (Finland) Krista Pärmäkoski, 1 (2) first place
- (Russia) Natalya Matveyeva, 1 (2) first place
- (Slovenia) Anamarija Lampič, 1 (1) first place

== Retirements ==
Following are notable cross-country skiers who announced their retirement:

Men

- Martin Johansson (SWE)
- Tomas Northug (NOR)
- Johan Olsson (SWE)
- Tim Tscharnke (GER)

Women

- Marthe Kristoffersen (NOR)
