= Maiken Caspersen Falla =

Norwegian cross-country skier

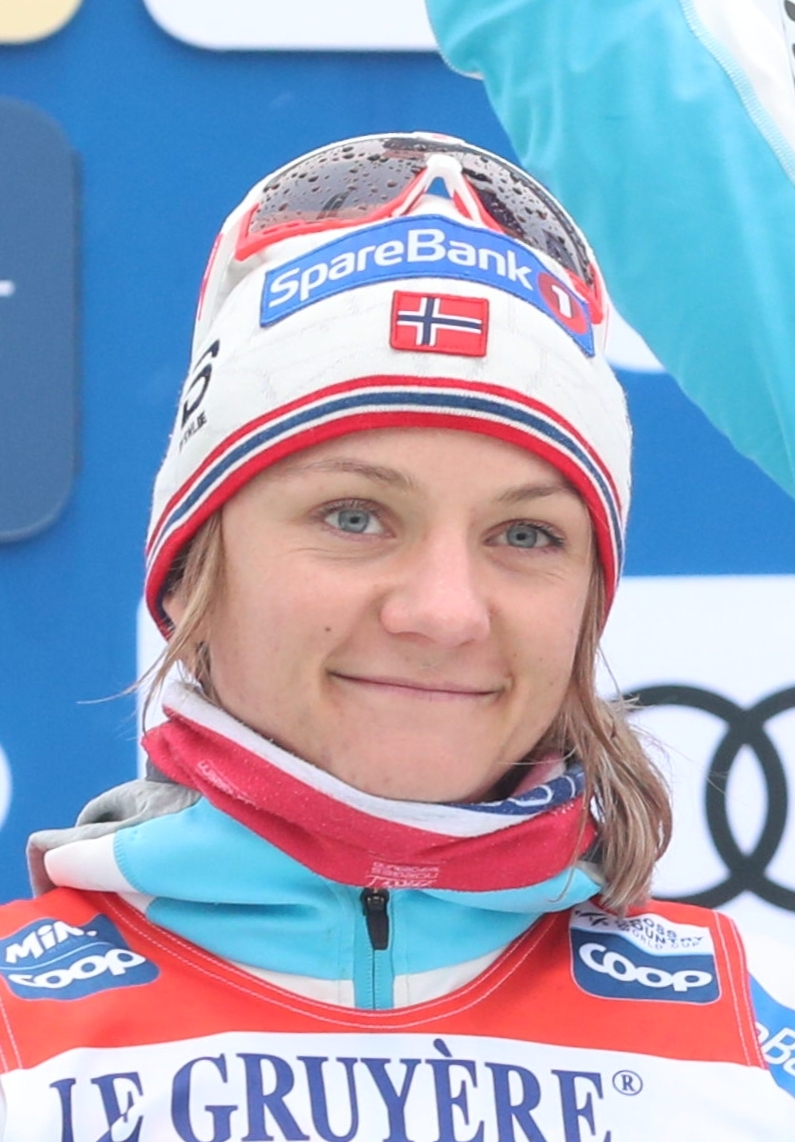
- Falla in 2019

Personal information
- Full name: Maiken Caspersen Falla
- Nationality: Norway
- Born: 13 August 1990 (age 36) Fet, Akershus, Norway
- Height: 1.61 m (5 ft 3 in)

Sport
- Sport: Skiing
- Club: Strandbygda IL

World Cup career
- Seasons: 14 – (2009–2022)
- Indiv. starts: 168
- Indiv. podiums: 55
- Indiv. wins: 22
- Team starts: 22
- Team podiums: 15
- Team wins: 6
- Overall titles: 0 – (6th in 2015, 2016)
- Discipline titles: 3 – (3 SP: 2016–2018)
Medal record
Women's cross-country skiing
Representing Norway
International nordic ski competitions
Event	1st	2nd	3rd
Olympic Games	1	1	1
World Championships	5	1	4
Total	6	2	5
Olympic Games
Gold medal – first place	2014 Sochi	Individual sprint
Silver medal – second place	2018 Pyeongchang	Individual sprint
Bronze medal – third place	2018 Pyeongchang	Team sprint
World Championships
Gold medal – first place	2015 Falun	Team sprint
Gold medal – first place	2017 Lahti	Individual sprint
Gold medal – first place	2017 Lahti	Team sprint
Gold medal – first place	2017 Lahti	4 × 5 km relay
Gold medal – first place	2019 Seefeld	Individual sprint
Silver medal – second place	2021 Oberstdorf	Individual sprint
Bronze medal – third place	2011 Oslo	Team sprint
Bronze medal – third place	2013 Val di Fiemme	Individual sprint
Bronze medal – third place	2015 Falun	Individual sprint
Bronze medal – third place	2019 Seefeld	Team sprint
Junior World Championships
Gold medal – first place	2009 Praz de Lys-Sommand	4 × 3.33 km relay
Bronze medal – third place	2009 Praz de Lys-Sommand	Individual sprint

Maiken Caspersen Falla (born 13 August 1990) is a Norwegian former cross-country skier who specialized in sprint and short-distance races. She is the 2014 Olympic champion in the individual sprint and three-time Olympic medalist. She became the individual sprint World champion at the 2017 FIS Nordic World Ski Championships and successfully defended her World title in 2019. Falla won a total of five gold, one silver and four bronze medals at the World Championships in her career and she is the most medalled skier in the individual sprint discipline in the Championship history with five medals. Winner of three consecutive Sprint World Cup crystal globes, Falla's highest finish in the overall World Cup standings was sixth-place which she achieved in 2014–15 and 2015–16 World Cup seasons.

With 22 World Cup sprint victories, Falla is the second-most successful female World Cup sprinter of all time, only behind Marit Bjørgen. She also shares the record of most sprint victories in a single season with Petra Majdič at eight victories.

She announced her retirement from cross-country skiing in April 2022.

== Career ==
Falla made her World Cup debut with a classical sprint race in Kuusamo on 29 November 2008, where she finished in 22nd place. She reached her first World Cup podium in Düsseldorf in her second ever World Cup race. With that promising start, Falla was given a spot in the individual sprint race at the 2009 FIS Nordic World Ski Championships in Liberec, but she failed to qualify for the quarter-finals by finishing 39th in qualifying round. After a podium appearance in her rookie season, Falla could not make the World Cup podium for more than two years. During that span, her sixth-place finish at the classical sprint in Kuusamo helped her to secure a spot in the Norwegian Olympic team for the 2010 Winter Olympics in Vancouver. At the Olympics, she finished 20th in the individual sprint event.

Falla returned to World Cup podium in 2010/11 season with a third place at the classical sprint in Otepää, then she backed up that performance with a second-place finish in Drammen. With two podiums in the last two sprints prior to the 2011 FIS Nordic World Ski Championships, she became one of the medal favorites in the upcoming home World Championships in Oslo Holmenkollen. At the World Championships, after setting the third fastest time in the qualification Falla took a fall in her quarter final heat and eliminated from the competition in that stage after finishing third in the heat. After the disappointment in the individual sprint, Falla was not initially considered for the team sprint but after the withdrawal of Marit Bjørgen, she was selected for the event alongside Astrid Uhrenholdt Jacobsen and the pair went on to take a bronze medal behind the Swedish and Finnish teams.

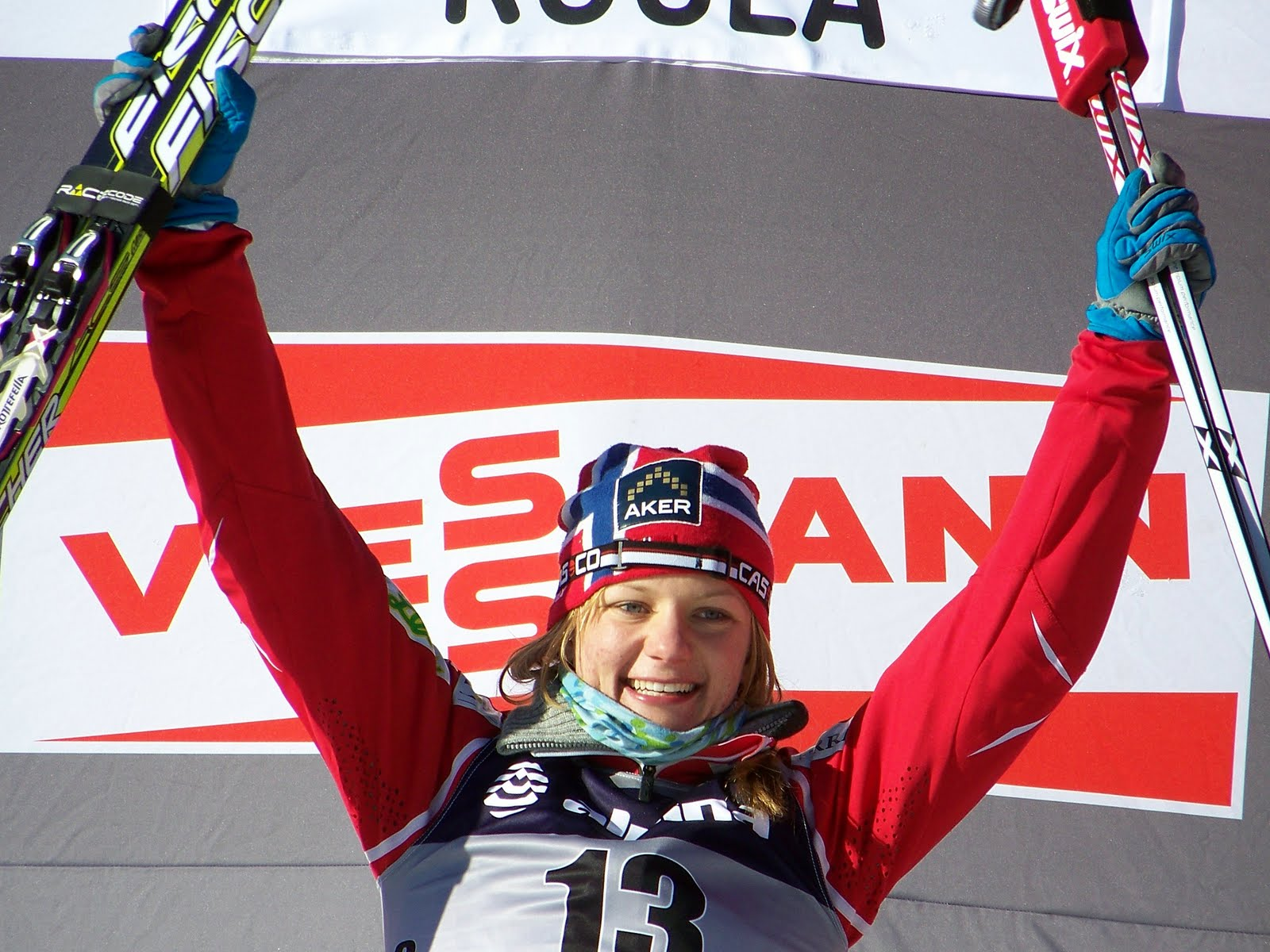
Falla during the podium ceremony after winning her first World Cup race in Rogla in December 2011.

In 2011/12 season, Falla won her first World Cup victory in a freestyle sprint race in Rogla, Slovenia. She also reached four more podiums during the season and finished the season in second place in sprint rankings behind Kikkan Randall.

Falla started 2012/13 season in very good form with one victory and three podiums from her first three sprint races. She also reached a podium in a distance race for the first time, a 10 km mass start race in Canmore, but her level dropped after mid-January, and she could not make a single top 10 in the remainder of the World Cup season. Despite the decrease in performance, at the 2013 FIS Nordic World Ski Championships in Val di Fiemme, Falla won her first individual World Championship medal with a bronze medal in the individual sprint event. For the team sprint race she teamed up with Ingvild Flugstad Østberg but the pair missed the medals and finished in fourth place mainly due to Østberg’s fall in the penultimate leg of the race.

Falla has not started well to 2013/14 season and she managed to reach only one podium in World Cup sprints before the Olympics. At the 2014 Winter Olympics in Sochi Falla won the gold medal in individual sprint despite more than one year without a victory in the World Cup. She dominated the event from start to finish by setting the fastest time in the qualifying round and winning every heat she competed. She was left out in the team sprint since her teammates Marit Bjørgen and Ingvild Flugstad Østberg has shown better performance in classical discipline throughout the season. Although the reason was understandable for many, some people – including Bente Skari – criticized the decision of putting Bjørgen into the team instead of Olympic champion Falla. After the Olympics, Falla earned her sole World Cup victory of the season in the prestigious classical sprint race in Drammen.

In 2014/15 season, Falla recorded four World Cup podiums and her only victory of the season once again came in Drammen. She finished the season in third place in sprint rankings behind her teammates Bjørgen and Østberg. At the 2015 FIS Nordic World Ski Championships in Falun, Falla earned her first World Championship gold medal in the team sprint event with Østberg, but once again she had to settle for bronze medal in the individual sprint behind Marit Bjørgen and Stina Nilsson.

Falla's best season to date in terms of wins came in 2015/16 season. She was the dominant force in sprint races of the World cup throughout the season by winning eight of eleven sprint races, she participated in and missed the podium only once in the entire season. That came in Planica where she was dealing with illness. With eight sprint victories, Falla equaled the Petra Majdič’s record of most World Cup sprint victories in a single season. At the end of the season she clinched the seasonal sprint World Cup title for the first time in her career.

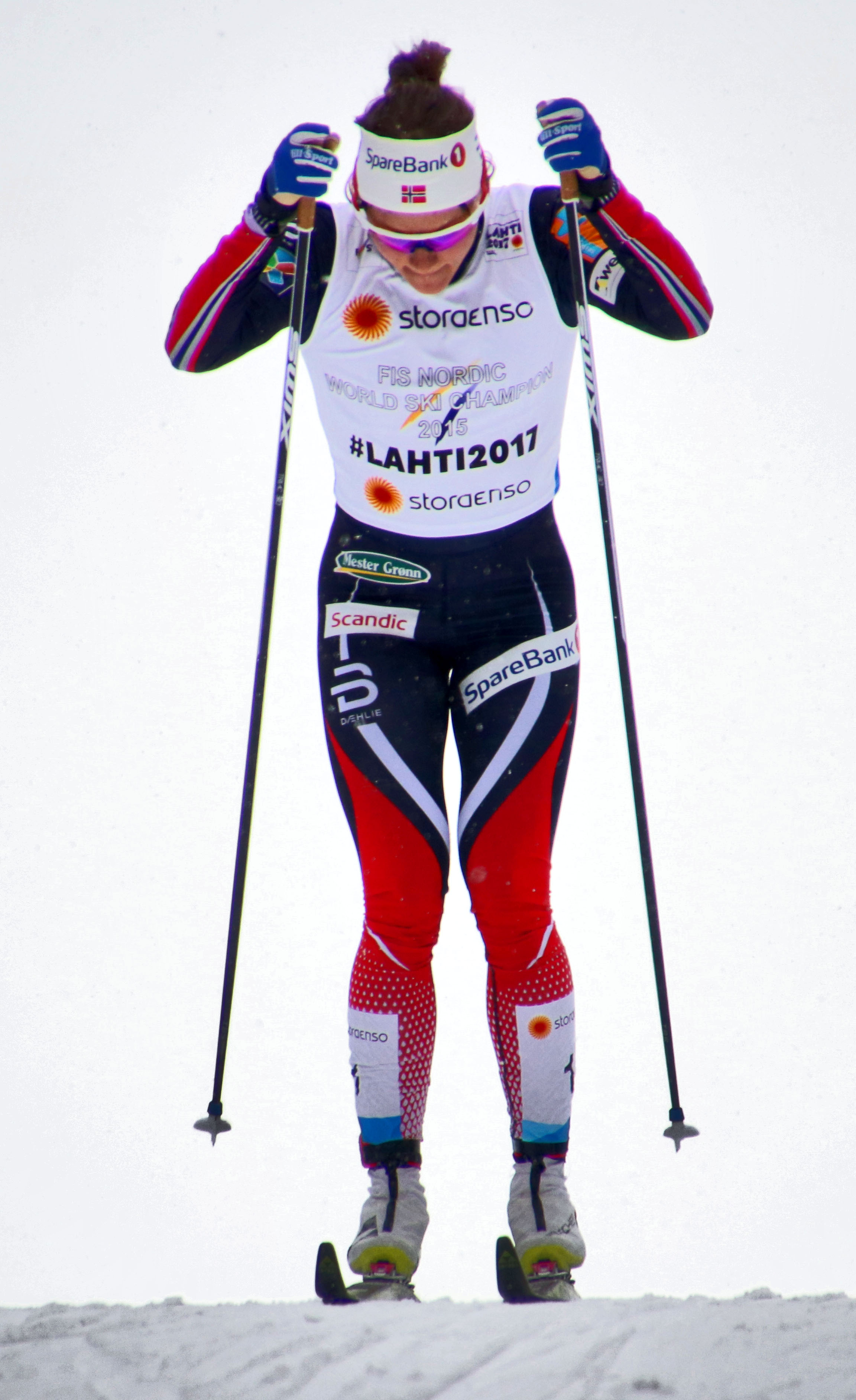
Falla at the 2017 World Championships where she won three gold medals in three races.

In 2016/17 season, Falla defended her sprint World Cup title despite being outsprinted by Sweden's Stina Nilsson in most of the sprint races. Although Falla has only one sprint victory compared to Nilsson's six, she took the advantage in sprint rankings when Nilsson opted not to ski in Toblach and she maintained it until the end of the season. At the 2017 FIS Nordic World Ski Championships in Lahti, Falla took the gold medal in the individual sprint in a similar fashion to her Olympic title and won the only sprint title that has eluded her in her career. She set the fastest time in the qualification and won every heat she competed during the process, while her archrival Nilsson was disqualified in the semifinal. By winning the gold medal, she became the second female skier to win Olympic, World and World Cup sprint title after her compatriot Marit Bjørgen who reached that triple crown in 2010 but Falla has the distinction of holding those three honours at the same time. During the championships, Falla added two more gold medals to her medal tally and finished the championships with three gold medals. Along with Heidi Weng, she once again brought the World team sprint title to Norway. She was also the member of the Norwegian relay team that won the gold medal in 4 × 5 km relay, running the opening classical leg.

== Personal life ==
Falla resides in Lillehammer along with her partner Kristian Hågensen Aune, a former football player who has served as a captain for the Norwegian club Levanger FK. Her twin brother Marius Caspersen Falla is also a cross-country skier.

== Cross-country skiing results ==
All results are sourced from the International Ski Federation (FIS).

=== Olympic Games ===
- 3 medals – (1 gold, 1 silver, 1 bronze)

Year	Age	10 km individual	15 km skiathlon	30 km mass start	Sprint	4 × 5 km relay	Team sprint
2010	19	—	—	—	20	—	—
2014	23	—	—	—	Gold	—	—
2018	27	—	—	—	Silver	—	Bronze
2022	31	—	—	—	8	—	8

=== World Championships ===
- 10 medals – (5 gold, 1 silver, 4 bronze)

Year	Age	10 km individual	15 km skiathlon	30 km mass start	Sprint	4 × 5 km relay	Team sprint
2009	18	—	—	—	39	—	—
2011	20	—	—	—	13	—	Bronze
2013	22	—	—	—	Bronze	—	4
2015	24	—	—	—	Bronze	—	Gold
2017	26	—	—	—	Gold	Gold	Gold
2019	28	—	—	—	Gold	—	Bronze
2021	30	—	—	—	Silver	—	6

=== World Cup ===
==== Season titles ====
- 3 titles – (3 sprint)

Season
Season	Discipline
2016	Sprint
2017	Sprint
2018	Sprint

==== Season standings ====
Season	Age	Discipline standings			Ski Tour standings				
Season	Age	Overall	Distance	Sprint	Nordic Opening	Tour de Ski	Ski Tour 2020	World Cup Final	Ski Tour Canada
2009	18	39	—	15	—N/a	—	—N/a	—	—N/a
2010	19	55	—	25	—N/a	—	—N/a	—	—N/a
2011	20	24	NC	6	DNF	—	—N/a	DNF	—N/a
2012	21	12	35	2nd place, silver medalist(s)	11	—	—N/a	16	—N/a
2013	22	19	35	4	—	—	—N/a	14	—N/a
2014	23	16	37	5	16	—	—N/a	18	—N/a
2015	24	6	37	3rd place, bronze medalist(s)	7	DNF	—N/a	—N/a	—N/a
2016	25	6	20	1st place, gold medalist(s)	10	DNF	—N/a	—N/a	10
2017	26	7	24	1st place, gold medalist(s)	7	DNF	—N/a	7	—N/a
2018	27	11	32	1st place, gold medalist(s)	21	DNF	—N/a	15	—N/a
2019	28	11	52	2nd place, silver medalist(s)	—	DNF	—N/a	13	—N/a
2020	29	24	NC	5	—	DNF	DNF	—N/a	—N/a
2021	30	80	—	47	—	—	—N/a	—N/a	—N/a
2022	31	22	61	7	—N/a	—	—N/a	—N/a	—N/a

==== Individual podiums ====
- 22 victories – (16 WC, 6 SWC)
- 55 podiums – (39 WC, 15 SWC)

No.	Season	Date	Location	Race	Level	Place
1	2008–09	20 December 2008	Düsseldorf, Germany	0.8 km Sprint F	World Cup	3rd
2	2010–11	23 January 2011	Otepää, Estonia	1.2 km Sprint C	World Cup	3rd
3	2010–11	20 February 2011	Drammen, Norway	1.2 km Sprint F	World Cup	2nd
4	2010–11	16 March 2011	Stockholm, Sweden	1.0 km Sprint C	Stage World Cup	3rd
5	2011–12	11 December 2011	Davos, Switzerland	1.5 km Sprint F	World Cup	3rd
6	2011–12	18 December 2011	Rogla, Slovenia	1.0 km Sprint F	World Cup	1st
7	2011–12	14 January 2012	Milano, Italy	1.4 km Sprint F	World Cup	3rd
8	2011–12	17 February 2012	Szklarska Poręba, Poland	1.6 km Sprint F	World Cup	2nd
9	2011–12	14 March 2012	Stockholm, Sweden	1.0 km Sprint C	Stage World Cup	3rd
10	2012–13	8 December 2012	Quebec City, Canada	1.6 km Sprint F	World Cup	2nd
11	2012–13	13 December 2012	Canmore, Canada	10 km Mass Start C	World Cup	3rd
12	2012–13	15 December 2012	Canmore, Canada	1.3 km Sprint F	World Cup	1st
13	2012–13	12 January 2013	Liberec, Czech Republic	0.85 km Sprint C	World Cup	3rd
14	2013–14	21 December 2013	Asiago, Italy	1.25 km Sprint C	World Cup	3rd
15	2013–14	5 March 2014	Drammen, Norway	1.3 km Sprint C	World Cup	1st
16	2014–15	29 November 2014	Rukatunturi, Finland	1.4 km Sprint C	World Cup	3rd
17	2014–15	14 December 2014	Davos, Switzerland	1.3 km Sprint F	World Cup	2nd
18	2014–15	14 February 2015	Östersund, Sweden	1.2 km Sprint C	World Cup	2nd
19	2014–15	11 March 2015	Drammen, Norway	1.3 km Sprint C	World Cup	1st
20	2015–16	27 November 2015	Rukatunturi, Finland	1.4 km Sprint C	Stage World Cup	1st
21	2015–16	13 December 2015	Davos, Switzerland	1.6 km Sprint F	World Cup	2nd
22	2015–16	19 December 2015	Toblach, Italy	1.3 km Sprint F	World Cup	1st
23	2015–16	1 January 2016	Lenzerheide, Switzerland	1.5 km Sprint F	Stage World Cup	1st
24	2015–16	3 February 2016	Drammen, Norway	1.2 km Sprint C	World Cup	1st
25	2015–16	11 February 2016	Stockholm, Sweden	1.2 km Sprint C	World Cup	1st
26	2015–16	20 February 2016	Lahti, Finland	1.6 km Sprint F	World Cup	1st
27	2015–16	1 March 2016	Gatineau, Canada	1.7 km Sprint F	Stage World Cup	1st
28	2015–16	4 March 2016	Quebec City, Canada	1.5 km Sprint F	Stage World Cup	2nd
29	2015–16	8 March 2016	Canmore, Canada	1.5 km Sprint C	Stage World Cup	1st
30	2016–17	26 November 2016	Rukatunturi, Finland	1.4 km Sprint C	World Cup	2nd
31	2016–17	2 December 2016	Lillehammer, Norway	1.3 km Sprint C	Stage World Cup	2nd
32	2016–17	11 December 2016	Davos, Switzerland	1.6 km Sprint F	World Cup	1st
33	2016–17	31 December 2016	Val Müstair, Switzerland	1.5 km Sprint F	Stage World Cup	2nd
34	2016–17	14 January 2017	Toblach, Italy	1.3 km Sprint F	World Cup	2nd
35	2016–17	28 January 2017	Falun, Sweden	1.4 km Sprint F	World Cup	2nd
36	2016–17	18 February 2017	Otepää, Estonia	1.3 km Sprint F	World Cup	2nd
37	2016–17	17 March 2017	Quebec City, Canada	1.5 km Sprint F	Stage World Cup	2nd
38	2017–18	2 December 2017	Lillehammer, Norway	1.3 km Sprint C	World Cup	1st
39	2017–18	9 December 2017	Davos, Switzerland	1.5 km Sprint F	World Cup	2nd
40	2017–18	30 December 2017	Lenzerheide, Switzerland	1.5 km Sprint F	Stage World Cup	3rd
41	2017–18	4 January 2018	Oberstdorf, Germany	10 km Mass Start F	Stage World Cup	2nd
42	2017–18	20 January 2018	Planica, Slovenia	1.4 km Sprint C	World Cup	3rd
43	2017–18	27 January 2018	Seefeld, Austria	1.1 km Sprint F	World Cup	3rd
44	2017–18	3 March 2018	Lahti, Finland	1.4 km Sprint F	World Cup	1st
45	2017–18	7 March 2018	Drammen, Norway	1.2 km Sprint C	World Cup	1st
46	2018–19	19 January 2019	Otepää, Estonia	1.3 km Sprint C	World Cup	1st
47	2018–19	9 February 2019	Lahti, Finland	1.4 km Sprint F	World Cup	1st
48	2018–19	12 March 2019	Drammen, Norway	1.2 km Sprint C	World Cup	1st
49	2018–19	16 March 2019	Falun, Sweden	1.4 km Sprint F	World Cup	2nd
50	2019–20	29 November 2019	Rukatunturi, Finland	1.4 km Sprint C	Stage World Cup	1st
51	2019–20	14 December 2019	Davos, Switzerland	1.5 km Sprint F	World Cup	2nd
52	2019–20	29 December 2019	Lenzerheide, Switzerland	1.5 km Sprint F	Stage World Cup	2nd
53	2019–20	22 February 2020	Trondheim, Norway	1.5 km Sprint C	Stage World Cup	1st
54	2021–22	26 November 2021	Rukatunturi, Finland	1.4 km Sprint C	World Cup	3rd
55	2021–22	3 March 2022	Drammen, Norway	1.2 km Sprint C	World Cup	1st

==== Team podiums ====
- 6 victories – (2 RL, 4 TS)
- 15 podiums – (2 RL, 13 TS)

No.	Season	Date	Location	Race	Level	Place	Teammate(s)
1	2008–09	21 December 2008	Düsseldorf, Germany	6 × 0.8 km Team Sprint F	World Cup	2nd	Brun-Lie
2	2009–10	6 December 2009	Düsseldorf, Germany	6 × 0.8 km Team Sprint F	World Cup	3rd	Brun-Lie
3	2010–11	5 December 2010	Düsseldorf, Germany	6 × 0.9 km Team Sprint F	World Cup	2nd	Brun-Lie
4	2010–11	16 January 2011	Liberec, Czech Republic	6 × 1.3 km Team Sprint C	World Cup	1st	Bjørgen
5	2011–12	4 December 2011	Düsseldorf, Germany	6 × 0.9 km Team Sprint F	World Cup	1st	Eide
6	2012–13	7 December 2012	Quebec City, Canada	6 × 1.6 km Team Sprint F	World Cup	3rd	Brun-Lie
7	2012–13	13 January 2013	Liberec, Czech Republic	6 × 0.85 km Team Sprint F	World Cup	1st	Østberg
8	2013–14	22 December 2013	Asiago, Italy	6 × 1.25 km Team Sprint C	World Cup	2nd	Østberg
9	2013–14	12 January 2014	Nové Město, Czech Republic	6 × 1.3 km Team Sprint C	World Cup	1st	Østberg
10	2014–15	18 January 2015	Otepää, Estonia	6 × 1.2 km Team Sprint F	World Cup	2nd	Østberg
11	2015–16	6 December 2015	Lillehammer, Norway	4 × 5 km Relay C/F	World Cup	1st	Østberg / Johaug / Weng
12	2016–17	15 January 2017	Toblach, Italy	6 × 1.3 km Team Sprint F	World Cup	3rd	Jacobsen
13	2018–19	13 January 2019	Dresden, Germany	6 × 1.6 km Team Sprint F	World Cup	3rd	Eide
14	2018–19	10 February 2019	Lahti, Finland	6 × 1.4 km Team Sprint C	World Cup	2nd	T. Udnes Weng
15	2019–20	8 December 2019	Lillehammer, Norway	4 × 5 km Relay C/F	World Cup	1st	Jacobsen / Johaug / Weng

==== Overall record ====
As of 11 March 2022

Result	Distance Races^{[a]}							Sprint	Ski Tours	Individual Events	Team Events		All Events
Result	≤ 5 km^{[b]}	≤ 10 km^{[b]}	≤ 15 km^{[b]}	≤ 30 km^{[b]}	≥ 30 km^{[b]}	Pursuit	Skiathlon	Sprint	Ski Tours	Individual Events	Team Sprint	Relay	All Events
1st place	–	–	–	–	–	–	–	22	–	22	4	2	28
2nd place	–	1	–	–	–	–	–	18	–	19	5	–	24
3rd place	–	1	–	–	–	–	–	13	–	14	4	–	18
Podiums	–	2	–	–	–	–	–	53	–	55	13	2	70
Top 10	1	5	1	–	–	4	3	84	5	103	16	5	124
Points	9	13	1	3	–	14	7	98	13	158	17	5	180
Others	2	8	–	–	1	4	–	8	–	23	–	–	23
DNF	–	–	–	–	–	–	–	–	9	9	–	–	9
Starts	11	21	1	3	1	18	7	106	22	190	17	5	211

a. ^{1} Classification is made according to FIS classification.
b. ^{1} ^{2} ^{3} ^{4} ^{5} Includes individual and mass start races.
