= Hanna Falk =

Swedish cross-country skier

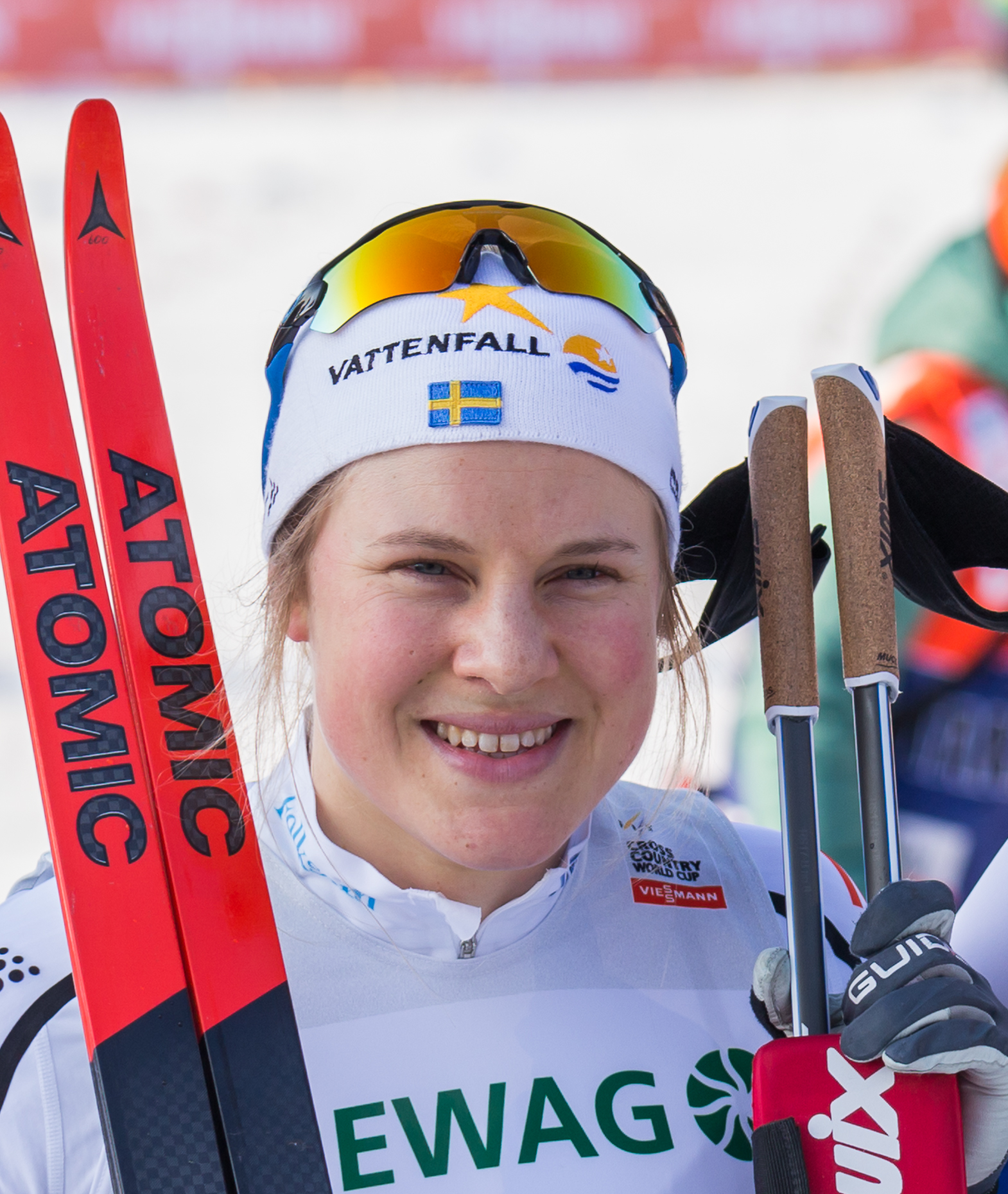
- Hanna Falk in January 2018

Personal information
- Full name: Hanna Linnéa Falk
- Nationality: Sweden
- Born: 5 July 1989 (age 37) Ulricehamn, Sweden

Sport
- Sport: Skiing
- Club: Ulricehamns IF SK

World Cup career
- Seasons: 13 – (2007, 2010–2021)
- Indiv. starts: 113
- Indiv. podiums: 11
- Indiv. wins: 4
- Team starts: 13
- Team podiums: 5
- Team wins: 0
- Overall titles: 0 – (20th in 2010, 2017, 2018)
- Discipline titles: 0
Medal record
Women's cross-country skiing
Representing Sweden
Junior World Championships
Silver medal – second place	2008 Mals	4 × 3.33 km relay
Silver medal – second place	2009 Praz de Lys-Sommand	4 × 3.33 km relay

Hanna Falk (born 5 July 1989 in Ulricehamn, Sweden) is a Swedish cross-country skier who has competed since 2006. She finished 29th in the individual sprint event at the 2010 Winter Olympics in Vancouver.

She announced her retirement from World Cup cross-country skiing in April 2021.

== Cross-country skiing results ==
All results are sourced from the International Ski Federation (FIS).

=== Olympic Games ===
Year	Age	10 km individual	15 km skiathlon	30 km mass start	Sprint	4 × 5 km relay	Team sprint
2010	20	—	—	—	29	—	—
2018	28	21	—	—	5	—	—

=== World Championships ===
Year	Age	10 km individual	15 km skiathlon	30 km mass start	Sprint	4 × 5 km relay	Team sprint
2011	21	—	—	—	11	—	—
2015	25	—	—	—	DSQ	—	—
2017	27	15	—	—	4	—	—
2019	29	—	—	—	13	—	—

=== World Cup ===
==== Season standings ====
Season	Age	Discipline standings			Ski Tour standings				
Season	Age	Overall	Distance	Sprint	Nordic Opening	Tour de Ski	Ski Tour 2020	World Cup Final	Ski Tour Canada
2007	17	NC	—	NC	—N/a	—	—N/a	—N/a	—N/a
2010	20	20	NC	5	—N/a	—	—N/a	40	—N/a
2011	21	33	NC	10	DNF	—	—N/a	DNF	—N/a
2012	22	111	—	77	—	—	—N/a	—	—N/a
2013	23	81	—	48	—	—	—N/a	—	—N/a
2014	24	63	—	35	—	—	—N/a	—	—N/a
2015	25	31	NC	8	59	—N/a	—N/a	—N/a	—N/a
2016	26	26	37	11	17	DNF	—N/a	—N/a	32
2017	27	20	41	3rd place, bronze medalist(s)	34	—	—N/a	32	—N/a
2018	28	20	55	4	26	—	—N/a	25	—N/a
2019	29	44	76	20	DNF	—	—N/a	—	—N/a
2020	30	124	—	91	—	—	—	—	—N/a
2021	31	64	—	38	—	—	—N/a	—	—N/a

==== Individual podiums ====
- 4 victories – (3 WC, 1 SWC)
- 11 podiums – (8 WC, 3 SWC)

No.	Season	Date	Location	Race	Level	Place
1	2009–10	5 December 2009	Düsseldorf, Germany	0.8 km Sprint F	World Cup	1st
2	2009–10	17 January 2010	Otepää, Estonia	1.2 km Sprint C	World Cup	1st
3	2010–11	15 January 2011	Liberec, Czech Republic	1.3 km Sprint F	World Cup	2nd
4	2016–17	2 December 2016	Lillehammer, Norway	1.3 km Sprint C	Stage World Cup	3rd
5	2016–17	11 December 2016	Davos, Switzerland	1.6 km Sprint F	World Cup	3rd
6	2016–17	14 January 2017	Toblach, Italy	1.3 km Sprint F	World Cup	3rd
7	2016–17	8 March 2017	Drammen, Norway	1.2 km Sprint C	World Cup	3rd
8	2016–17	17 March 2017	Quebec City, Canada	1.5 km Sprint F	Stage World Cup	3rd
9	2017–18	13 January 2018	Dresden, Germany	1.2 km Sprint F	World Cup	1st
10	2017–18	3 March 2018	Lahti, Finland	1.4 km Sprint F	World Cup	3rd
11	2017–18	16 March 2018	Falun, Sweden	1.4 km Sprint F	Stage World Cup	1st

==== Team podiums ====
- 5 podiums – (1 RL, 4 TS)

No.	Season	Date	Location	Race	Level	Place	Teammate(s)
1	2009–10	6 December 2009	Düsseldorf, Germany	6 × 0.8 km Team Sprint F	World Cup	2nd	Ingemarsdotter
2	2016–17	15 January 2017	Toblach, Italy	6 × 1.3 km Team Sprint F	World Cup	2nd	Ingemarsdotter
3	2016–17	22 January 2017	Ulricehamn, Sweden	4 × 5 km Relay C/F	World Cup	3rd	Ingemarsdotter / Henriksson / Kalla
4	2017–18	14 January 2018	Dresden, Germany	6 × 1.2 km Team Sprint F	World Cup	2nd	Nilsson
5	2018–19	10 February 2019	Lahti, Finland	6 × 1.4 km Team Sprint C	World Cup	3rd	Settlin
