= Silje Øyre Slind =

Norwegian cross-country skier

Personal information
- Nationality: Norway
- Born: February 9, 1988 (age 38)

Sport
- Sport: Skiing
- Club: Oppdal IL

World Cup career
- Seasons: 9 (2012–2020, 2022–present)
- Indiv. starts: 72
- Indiv. podiums: 1
- Indiv. wins: 0
- Team starts: 5
- Team podiums: 1
- Team wins: 0
- Overall titles: 0 – (27th in 2017)
- Discipline titles: 0
- Updated on 31 December 2021

Silje Øyre Slind (born 9 February 1988) is a Norwegian cross-country skier.

She made her World Cup debut in the 2011–12 season opener at Sjusjøen, finishing 32nd. She collected several World Cup points in the 2014–15 season, recording sixth and eight places in Rybinsk in January 2015. She once again broke the top-ten barrier in December 2015, finishing seventh in the Lillehammer sprint. In February 2017 she made her first podiums, in Pyeongchang where she finished second in the sprint and team sprint.

She also competed at the 2013 Winter Universiade, recording a sixth place (relay) and a seventh place.

She represented the sports clubs Oppdal IL. She is the twin sister of Astrid Øyre Slind and older sister of Kari Øyre Slind.

== Cross-country skiing results ==
All results are sourced from the International Ski Federation (FIS).

=== World Cup ===
==== Season standings ====
Season	Age	Discipline standings			Ski Tour standings				
Season	Age	Overall	Distance	Sprint	Nordic Opening	Tour de Ski	Ski Tour 2020	World Cup Final	Ski Tour Canada
2012	24	NC	NC	—	—	—	—N/a	—	—N/a
2013	25	NC	NC	NC	—	—	—N/a	—	—N/a
2014	26	NC	NC	—	—	—	—N/a	—	—N/a
2015	27	51	42	36	50	—	—N/a	—N/a	—N/a
2016	28	78	52	NC	—	—	—N/a	—N/a	—
2017	29	27	25	26	51	16	—N/a	—	—N/a
2018	30	40	37	34	31	DNF	—N/a	19	—N/a
2019	31	77	51	NC	37	DNF	—N/a	—	—N/a
2020	32	66	45	77	—	—	—	—N/a	—N/a

==== Individual podiums ====
- 1 podium – (1 WC)

No.	Season	Date	Location	Race	Level	Place
1	2016–17	3 February 2017	Pyeongchang, South Korea	1.4 km Sprint C	World Cup	2nd

==== Team podiums ====
- 1 podium – (1 TS)

No.	Season	Date	Location	Race	Level	Place	Teammate
1	2016–17	5 February 2017	Pyeongchang, South Korea	6 × 1.4 km Team Sprint F	World Cup	2nd	Svendsen
