= Kathrine Harsem =

Norwegian cross-country skier (born 1989)

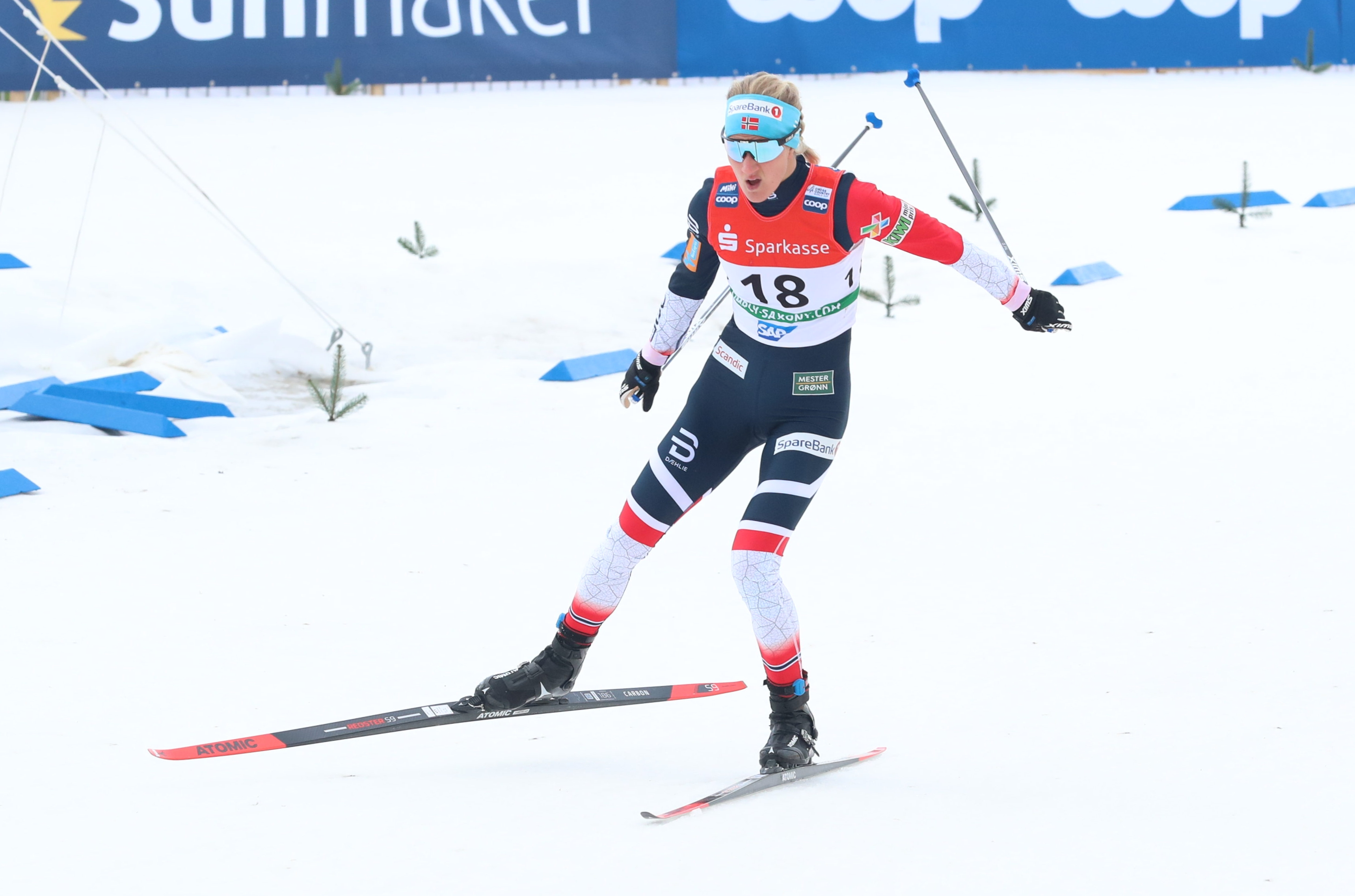
- Harsem in Dresden, 2019

Personal information
- Full name: Kathrine Rolsted Harsem
- Nationality: Norway
- Born: 7 February 1989 (age 37)

Sport
- Sport: Skiing
- Club: IL Varden Meråker

World Cup career
- Seasons: 14 – (2010–2023)
- Indiv. starts: 96
- Indiv. podiums: 1
- Indiv. wins: 0
- Team starts: 6
- Team podiums: 0
- Overall titles: 0 – (13th in 2017)
- Discipline titles: 0
Medal record
Women's cross-country skiing
Representing Norway
U23 World Championships
Bronze medal – third place	2010 Hinterzarten	Individual sprint
- Updated on 25 January 2023

Kathrine Rolsted Harsem (born 7 February 1989) is a Norwegian cross-country skier.

She made her FIS Cross-Country World Cup debut in March 2010 in Oslo. She collected her first World Cup points with a 17th-place finish in the March 2013 in Drammen. Her first top-10 placement came in February 2014 in Toblach. She was dropped from the Norwegian National Cross-country Team in May 2019, due to poor results during the 2018–19 season, where she was not selected for the World Championships in Seefeld.

She represents the sports club IL Varden, prior to 2011 for Fossum IF.

== Cross-country skiing results ==
All results are sourced from the International Ski Federation (FIS).

=== Olympic Games ===
Year	Age	10 km individual	15 km skiathlon	30 km mass start	Sprint	4 × 5 km relay	Team sprint
2018	29	—	—	—	18	—	—

=== World Championships ===
Year	Age	10 km individual	15 km skiathlon	30 km mass start	Sprint	4 × 5 km relay	Team sprint
2017	28	—	—	—	13	—	—

=== World Cup ===
==== Season standings ====
Season	Age	Discipline standings			Ski Tour standings				
Season	Age	Overall	Distance	Sprint	Nordic Opening	Tour de Ski	Ski Tour 2020	World Cup Final	Ski Tour Canada
2010	21	NC	—	NC	—N/a	—	—N/a	—	—N/a
2011	22	NC	NC	NC	—	—	—N/a	—	—N/a
2012	23	NC	NC	NC	—	—	—N/a	—	—N/a
2013	24	95	NC	59	—	—	—N/a	—	—N/a
2014	25	47	58	22	—	—	—N/a	33	—N/a
2015	26	47	68	18	32	—	—N/a	—N/a	—N/a
2016	27	29	31	18	19	—	—N/a	—N/a	—
2017	28	13	18	12	12	18	—N/a	15	—N/a
2018	29	14	16	9	11	DNF	—N/a	13	—N/a
2019	30	89	NC	57	32	—	—N/a	—	—N/a
2020	31	70	63	52	—	—	—	—N/a	—N/a
2021	32	125	93	—	—	—	—N/a	—N/a	—N/a
2022	33	84	—	54	—N/a	—	—N/a	—N/a	—N/a

==== Individual podiums ====
- 1 podium – (1 WC)

No.	Season	Date	Location	Race	Level	Place
1	2017–18	20 January 2018	Planica, Slovenia	1.4 km Sprint C	World Cup	2nd
