= Stina Nilsson =

Swedish cross-country skier

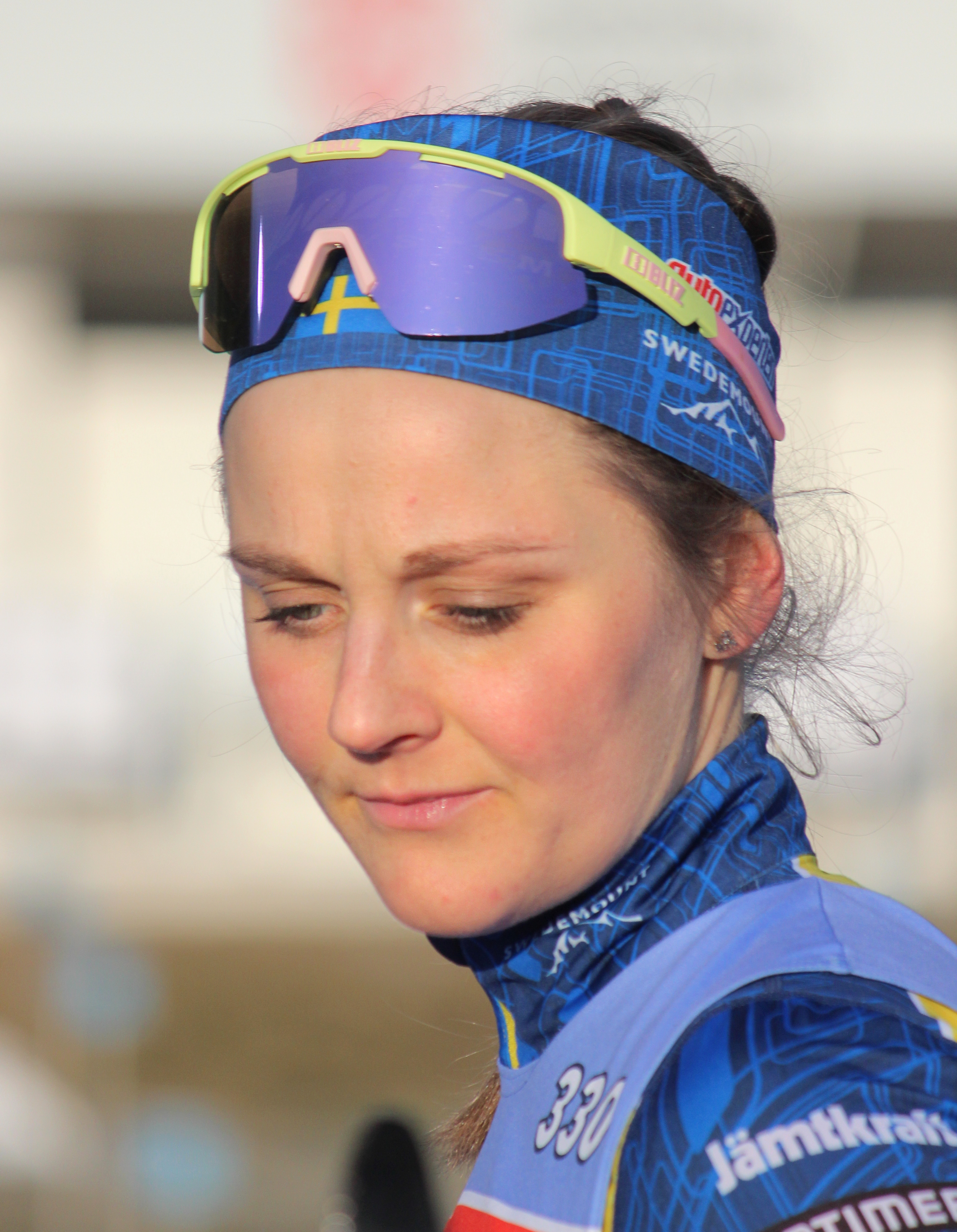
- Stina Nilsson in 2023

Personal information
- Full name: Täpp Karin Stina Nilsson
- Nationality: Sweden
- Born: 24 June 1993 (age 33) Malung, Sweden
- Height: 1.76 m (5 ft 9 in)

Sport
- Sport: Skiing
- Club: IFK Mora SK

World Cup career
- Seasons: 9 – (2012–2020) (cross-country skiing); 2 – (2021–2022) (biathlon)
- Indiv. starts: 108 (cross-country skiing); 14 (biathlon)
- Indiv. podiums: 41 (cross-country skiing); 1 (biathlon)
- Indiv. wins: 23 (cross-country skiing); 0 (biathlon)
- Team starts: 9 (cross-country skiing); 1 (biathlon)
- Team podiums: 7 (cross-country skiing); 1 (biathlon)
- Team wins: 3 (cross-country skiing); 0 (biathlon)
- Overall titles: 0 – (4th in 2017)
- Discipline titles: 3 – (2 U23, 1 SP)
Medal record
Representing Sweden
Women's cross-country skiing
International nordic ski competitions
Event	1st	2nd	3rd
Olympic Games	1	2	2
World Championships	2	5	0
Total	3	7	2
Olympic Games
Gold medal – first place	2018 Pyeongchang	Individual sprint
Silver medal – second place	2018 Pyeongchang	4 × 5 km relay
Silver medal – second place	2018 Pyeongchang	Team sprint
Bronze medal – third place	2014 Sochi	Team sprint
Bronze medal – third place	2018 Pyeongchang	30 km classical
World Championships
Gold medal – first place	2019 Seefeld	Team sprint
Gold medal – first place	2019 Seefeld	4 × 5 km relay
Silver medal – second place	2015 Falun	Individual sprint
Silver medal – second place	2015 Falun	Team sprint
Silver medal – second place	2015 Falun	4 × 5 km relay
Silver medal – second place	2017 Lahti	4 × 5 km relay
Silver medal – second place	2019 Seefeld	Individual sprint
Junior World Championships
Gold medal – first place	2012 Erzurum	Individual sprint
Gold medal – first place	2013 Liberec	Individual sprint
Gold medal – first place	2013 Liberec	4 × 3.33 km relay
Silver medal – second place	2012 Erzurum	4 × 3.33 km relay
European Youth Olympic Festival
Gold medal – first place	2011 Liberec	Individual sprint
Women's biathlon
European Championships
Bronze medal – third place	2023 Lenzerheide	Mixed relay
- Updated on 29 March 2020

Stina Nilsson (born 24 June 1993) is a Swedish former biathlete and former cross-country skier. She is a five-time Olympic medalist and the 2018 Olympic champion in the individual sprint. In March 2020 she announced that she would switch to competing in biathlon. In April 2024, she announced her return to cross-country skiing, this time as a long-distance racer. On 2 March 2025, she won the women's edition of Vasaloppet.

== Career ==
=== 2011–12: World Cup debut and Junior World Champion ===
Stina Nilsson finished 23rd in her World Cup debut in Drammen on 7 March 2012. Nilsson won the gold medal in the sprint event at the 2012 Junior World Championships in Erzurum, Turkey.

=== 2012–13 ===
At the 2013 Junior World Championships in Liberec, Czech Republic, Nilsson defended her gold medal in the sprint.

=== 2013–14: First Olympic medal and World Cup podium ===
On 19 February 2014, Nilsson and Ida Ingemarsdotter, won bronze medals together in the team sprint at the Olympic Games in Sochi. Nilsson also finished 10th in the individual sprint. She made her first individual World Cup podium on 5 March, having finished third in the classical sprint in Drammen.

=== 2014–15: Falun World Championships ===
Nilsson won three silver medals at the 2015 World Championships in Falun; On 19 February in the individual sprint, on 22 February in the team sprint (with Ida Ingemarsdotter), and on 26 February in the 4 × 5 km relay (with Sofia Bleckur, Charlotte Kalla, and Maria Rydqvist). Nilsson won the Under-23 World Cup title for the 2014–2015 season and finished fourth in the Sprint World Cup.

=== 2015–16 ===
She defended the U23 World Cup title in the 2015–2016 season and finished third in the Sprint World Cup, having won three individual sprint events over the season.

=== 2016–17 ===
On 2 March 2017, she won the silver medal in the 4 × 5 km relay (with Anna Haag, Charlotte Kalla, and Ebba Andersson) at the World Championships in Lahti. Nilsson won nine individual World Cup races over the 2016–2017 season, finishing fourth in the Overall World Cup and second in the Sprint World Cup. She also finished overall-third in the Tour de Ski.

=== 2017–18: Four Olympic medals ===
Nilsson won four medals at the 2018 Olympic Games in Pyeongchang. On 13 February she became an Olympic champion, having won the gold medal in the individual sprint. On 17 and 21 February respectively, she won silver medals in the 4 × 5 km relay (with Anna Haag, Charlotte Kalla, and Ebba Andersson) and in the team sprint (with Charlotte Kalla). On 25 February, Nilsson won a surprise bronze in the 30 km classical mass start. She also finished 10th in the 15 km skiathlon. She finished second in the 2017–2018 Sprint World Cup, having won three individual sprint events over the season.

She was awarded the Victoria Scholarship in 2018.

=== 2018-19: Continued World Championship success ===
Nilsson started the season off successfully, but injured her thigh in an extreme finish line stretch at the Otepää sprint event. She managed to recover just in time to return to competition at the 2019 World Championships in Seefeld, where she started her campaign with a silver medal in the freestyle sprint. She then went on to win her first World Championships gold medals in the classical team sprint and the 4 × 5 kilometre relay; in the latter, she anchored Sweden to the win by sprinting past Therese Johaug of Norway in the final uphill. Nilsson's success continued for the rest of the season and included a distance win at the World Cup finals in Quebec. She won the Sprint World Cup for the first time in her career.

=== 2019-20: Injuries, switch to biathlon ===
Nilsson suffered a rib injury in the summer, but started the season with stable results, including 2nd places in the sprint and team sprint in Planica. At the first event of the Tour de Ski, however, the injury aggravated and she was forced to quit the Tour. She soon decided to end her season early after the recovery training proved to have been too heavy. The podiums in Planica turned out to be her last as a cross-country skier.

On 22 March, she officially announced the unexpected news that she was switching sports to biathlon on her Instagram account. She left cross-country skiing as one of Sweden's most decorated skiers of the 2010s.

=== 2020-21: First steps in biathlon ===
For most of the 2020–21 season, Nilsson competed in the IBU Cup, where her season highlight was an 8th place in the pursuit at Brezno. A 2nd place in a relay held the same weekend marked Nilsson's first international biathlon podium. She also took part in the European Championships in January, placing 42nd in the sprint and 38th in the pursuit; struggles with shooting were consistently present during Nilsson's debut season.

In March 2021, Nilsson was selected to the Swedish team at their home World Cup competitions in Östersund, Sweden. She managed to perform well events, placing 26th in the sprint and 22nd in the pursuit, thus collecting her first world cup points already in her very first competitions in the Biathlon World Cup.

=== 2021-22: First World Cup podiums in biathlon, Olympic roster ===
In the spring of 2021, Nilsson officially became part of Sweden's national biathlon team, having previously held a so-called "developmental" spot in the team. In the summer biathlon Swedish championships, she sensationally won gold over the Öberg sisters, Elvira and Hanna.

Nilsson's second season as a biathlete saw her secure a near-permanent spot at the starting line in World Cup competitions; she took part in almost all WC weekends. Managing to recover her skiing speed and improving her aim, she reached the top twenty in eight individual competitions. In January 2022, she celebrated her first World Cup podium, a second place at the relay in Ruhpolding, where she got to ski a leg at the absence of Sweden's biggest biathlon stars. In March, Nilsson reached her first individual podium in biathlon when she placed third in the sprint at Kontiolahti, Finland.

She was named as the last athlete into the Swedish biathlon team for the 2022 Beijing Olympics, her first as a biathlete. Due to the success of her more seasoned teammates, Nilsson did not get to start in any of the races, which prevented her from getting a first chance at winning an Olympic medal in both cross-country skiing and biathlon.

== Cross-country skiing results ==
All results are sourced from the International Ski Federation (FIS).

=== Olympic Games ===
- 5 medals – (1 gold, 2 silver, 2 bronze)

Year	Age	10 km individual	15 km skiathlon	30 km mass start	Sprint	4 × 5 km relay	Team sprint
2014	20	—	—	—	10	—	Bronze
2018	24	—	10	Bronze	Gold	Silver	Silver

=== World Championships ===
- 7 medals – (2 gold, 5 silver)

Year	Age	10 km individual	15 km skiathlon	30 km mass start	Sprint	4 × 5 km relay	Team sprint
2013	19	—	—	—	5	—	—
2015	21	—	—	—	Silver	Silver	Silver
2017	23	13	26	—	12	Silver	4
2019	25	—	—	—	Silver	Gold	Gold

=== World Cup ===
==== Season titles ====
- 3 titles – (2 U23, 1 Sprint)

Season
Season	Discipline
2015	Under-23
2016	Under-23
2019	Sprint

==== Season standings ====
Season	Age	Discipline standings				Ski Tour standings				
Season	Age	Overall	Distance	Sprint	U23	Nordic Opening	Tour de Ski	Ski Tour 2020	World Cup Final	Ski Tour Canada
2012	18	93	—	63	—N/a	—	—	—N/a	—	—N/a
2013	19	67	—	38	—N/a	—	—	—N/a	—	—N/a
2014	20	35	72	12	—N/a	52	—	—N/a	DNF	—N/a
2015	21	12	41	4	1st place, gold medalist(s)	21	DNF	—N/a	—N/a	—N/a
2016	22	11	23	3rd place, bronze medalist(s)	1st place, gold medalist(s)	2nd place, silver medalist(s)	24	—N/a	—N/a	DNF
2017	23	4	6	2nd place, silver medalist(s)	—N/a	5	3rd place, bronze medalist(s)	—N/a	3rd place, bronze medalist(s)	—N/a
2018	24	12	33	2nd place, silver medalist(s)	—N/a	7	—	—N/a	—	—N/a
2019	25	5	20	1st place, gold medalist(s)	—N/a	6	DNF	—N/a	1st place, gold medalist(s)	—N/a
2020	26	29	46	16	—N/a	11	DNF	—	—N/a	—N/a

==== Individual podiums ====
- 23 victories – (12 WC, 11 SWC)
- 41 podiums – (24 WC, 17 SWC)

No.	Season	Date	Location	Race	Level	Place
1	2013–14	5 March 2014	Drammen, Norway	1.3 km Sprint C	World Cup	3rd
2	2013–14	14 March 2014	Falun, Sweden	1.2 km Sprint C	Stage World Cup	3rd
3	2014–15	21 December 2014	Davos, Switzerland	1.3 km Sprint F	World Cup	2nd
4	2014–15	17 January 2015	Otepää, Estonia	1.2 km Sprint C	World Cup	2nd
5	2014–15	14 February 2015	Östersund, Sweden	1.2 km Sprint C	World Cup	3rd
6	2015–16	27 November 2015	Rukatunturi, Finland	1.4 km Sprint C	Stage World Cup	2nd
7	2015–16	29 November 2015	Rukatunturi, Finland	10 km C Pursuit	Stage World Cup	2nd
8	2015–16	27–29 November 2015	(Finland) Nordic Opening	Overall Standings	World Cup	2nd
9	2015–16	13 December 2015	Davos, Switzerland	1.6 km Sprint F	World Cup	1st
10	2015–16	19 December 2015	Toblach, Italy	1.3 km Sprint F	World Cup	3rd
11	2015–16	16 January 2016	Planica, Slovenia	1.2 km Sprint F	World Cup	1st
12	2015–16	11 February 2016	Stockholm, Sweden	1.2 km Sprint C	World Cup	3rd
13	2015–16	1 March 2016	Gatineau, Canada	1.7 km Sprint F	Stage World Cup	2nd
14	2015–16	4 March 2016	Quebec City, Canada	1.5 km Sprint F	Stage World Cup	1st
15	2016–17	26 November 2016	Rukatunturi, Finland	1.4 km Sprint C	World Cup	1st
16	2016–17	31 December 2016	Val Müstair, Switzerland	1.5 km Sprint F	Stage World Cup	1st
17	2016–17	3 January 2017	Oberstdorf, Germany	5 km + 5 km C/F Skiathlon	Stage World Cup	1st
18	2016–17	4 January 2017	Oberstdorf, Germany	10 km F Pursuit	Stage World Cup	1st
19	2016–17	7 January 2017	Val di Fiemme, Italy	10 km C Mass Start	Stage World Cup	1st
20	2016–17	31 December 2016 – 8 January 2017	(Switzerland) (Germany) (Italy) Tour de Ski	Overall Standings	World Cup	3rd
21	2016–17	28 January 2017	Falun, Sweden	1.4 km Sprint F	World Cup	1st
22	2016–17	18 February 2017	Otepää, Estonia	1.3 km Sprint F	World Cup	1st
23	2016–17	8 March 2017	Drammen, Norway	1.2 km Sprint C	World Cup	1st
24	2016–17	17 March 2017	Quebec City, Canada	1.5 km Sprint F	Stage World Cup	1st
25	2016–17	19 March 2017	Quebec City, Canada	10 km F Pursuit	Stage World Cup	3rd
26	2016–17	17–19 March 2017	(Canada) World Cup Final	Overall Standings	World Cup	3rd
27	2017–18	24 November 2017	Rukatunturi, Finland	1.4 km Sprint C	Stage World Cup	1st
28	2017–18	9 December 2017	Davos, Switzerland	1.5 km Sprint F	World Cup	1st
29	2017–18	20 January 2018	Planica, Slovenia	1.4 km Sprint C	World Cup	1st
30	2017–18	3 March 2018	Lahti, Finland	1.4 km Sprint F	World Cup	2nd
31	2017–18	7 March 2018	Drammen, Norway	1.2 km Sprint C	World Cup	2nd
32	2018–19	30 November 2018	Lillehammer, Norway	1.3 km Sprint F	Stage World Cup	2nd
33	2018–19	15 December 2018	Davos, Switzerland	1.5 km Sprint F	World Cup	1st
34	2018–19	29 December 2018	Toblach, Italy	1.3 km Sprint F	Stage World Cup	1st
35	2018–19	1 January 2019	Val Müstair, Switzerland	1.4 km Sprint F	Stage World Cup	1st
36	2018–19	12 January 2019	Dresden, Germany	1.6 km Sprint F	World Cup	1st
37	2018–19	16 March 2019	Falun, Sweden	1.4 km Sprint F	World Cup	1st
38	2018–19	22 March 2019	Quebec City, Canada	1.6 km Sprint F	Stage World Cup	1st
39	2018–19	23 March 2019	Quebec City, Canada	10 km C Mass Start	Stage World Cup	1st
40	2018–19	22–24 March 2019	(Canada) World Cup Final	Overall Standings	World Cup	1st
41	2019–20	21 December 2019	Planica, Slovenia	1.2 km Sprint F	World Cup	2nd

==== Team podiums ====
- 3 victories – (3 TS)
- 7 podiums – (1 RL, 6 TS)

No.	Season	Date	Location	Race	Level	Place	Teammate(s)
1	2012–13	13 January 2013	Liberec, Czech Republic	6 × 0.85 km Team Sprint F	World Cup	2nd	Ingemarsdotter
2	2014–15	18 January 2015	Otepää, Estonia	6 × 1.2 km Team Sprint F	World Cup	1st	Ingemarsdotter
3	2015–16	17 January 2016	Planica, Slovenia	6 × 1.2 km Team Sprint F	World Cup	1st	Ingemarsdotter
4	2016–17	18 December 2016	La Clusaz, France	4 × 5 km Relay C/F	World Cup	3rd	Wikén / Rydqvist / Dyvik
5	2017–18	14 January 2018	Dresden, Germany	6 × 1.3 km Team Sprint F	World Cup	2nd	Falk
6	2018–19	13 January 2019	Dresden, Germany	6 × 1.6 km Team Sprint F	World Cup	1st	Dahlqvist
7	2019–20	22 December 2019	Planica, Slovenia	6 × 1.2 km Team Sprint F	World Cup	2nd	Sundling

== Biathlon results ==
All results are sourced from the International Biathlon Union.

=== World Cup ===
Season	Overall		Individual		Sprint		Pursuit		Mass start	
Season	Points	Position	Points	Position	Points	Position	Points	Position	Points	Position
2020-21	34	71st	-	-	15	73rd	19	59th	-	-

==== Individual podiums ====
- 0 victories
- 1 podiums

No.	Season	Date	Location	Race	Place
1	2021–22	5 March 2022	(Finland) Kontiolahti	Sprint	3rd

==== Team podiums ====
- 0 victories
- 1 podiums

No.	Season	Date	Location	Race	Place	Team
1	2021–22	14 January 2022	(Germany) Ruhpolding	Relay	2nd	Skottheim / Nilsson / Brorsson / Magnusson

*Results are from IBU races which include the Biathlon World Cup, Biathlon World Championships and the Winter Olympic Games.
