= List of skiers in the 2019–20 Tour de Ski =

List of skiers

The following is a list of nations and cross-country skiers that took part in the 2019–20 Tour de Ski.

== Nations ==
Each nation had right for a maximum of 10 start quotas per gender.

The nations entering the race will be (number of skiers in brackets):

Men

- Andorra (1)
- Austria (1)
- Belarus (1)
- Czech Republic (3)
- Finland (4)
- France (9)
- Germany (5)
- United Kingdom (2)
- Italy (7)
- Kazakhstan (5)
- Latvia (1)
- Norway (10)
- Poland (3)
- Ireland (1)
- Romania (1)
- Russia (8)
- Slovenia (1)
- Slovakia (1)
- Spain (1)
- Sweden (7)
- Switzerland (10)
- Thailand (1)
- United States (3)

Women

- Australia (1)
- Austria (2)
- Belarus (1)
- Croatia (1)
- Czech Republic (3)
- Finland (2)
- France (3)
- Germany (5)
- Italy (7)
- Kazakhstan (4)
- Latvia (1)
- Norway (10)
- Poland (3)
- Russia (7)
- Slovenia (4)
- Slovakia (1)
- Sweden (8)
- Switzerland (4)
- Thailand (1)
- United States (6)

== Skiers ==
Legend
Pos.	Position in the overall standings
	Denotes the winner of the overall standings
	Denotes the winner of the points standings
^{TEAM}	Denotes the winner of the team standings
DNS	Denotes a skier who did not start a stage, followed by the stage before which he or she withdrew
DNF	Denotes a skier who did not finish a stage, followed by the stage in which he or she withdrew
DSQ	Denotes a skier who was disqualified from the race, followed by the stage in which this occurred

=== By nation ===
==== Men ====
Andorra
Skier	Pos.
Irineu Esteve Altimiras (AND)	23

Austria
Skier	Pos.
Bernhard Tritscher (AUT)	DNS-3

Belarus
Skier	Pos.
Michail Semenov (BLR)	46

Czech Republic
Skier	Pos.
Petr Knop (CZE)	41
Adam Fellner (CZE)	47
Michal Novak (CZE)	DNS-3

Finland
Skier	Pos.
Iivo Niskanen (FIN)	10
Perttu Hyvärinen (FIN)	14
Lari Lehtonen (FIN)	38
Lauri Lepistö (FIN)	43

France
Skier	Pos.
Adrien Backscheider (FRA)	19
Clément Parisse (FRA)	21
Jean-Marc Gaillard (FRA)	22
Maurice Manificat (FRA)	26
Hugo Lapalus (FRA)	36
Renaud Jay (FRA)	DNS-6
Jules Chappaz (FRA)	DNS-4
Richard Jouve (FRA)	DNS-3
Lucas Chanavat (FRA)	DNS-1

Germany
Skier	Pos.
Lucas Bögl (GER)	16
Sebastian Eisenlauer (GER)	25
Janosch Brugger (GER)	DNS-5
Jonas Dobler (GER)	DNS-4
Florian Notz (GER)	DNS-4

Great Britain
Skier	Pos.
Andrew Musgrave (GBR)	32
James Clugnet (GBR)	DNS-2

Italy
Skier	Pos.
Giandomenico Salvadori (ITA)	29
Mikael Abram (ITA)	45
Maicol Rastelli (ITA)	51
Federico Pellegrino (ITA)	DNS-6
Stefan Zelger (ITA)	DNS-6
Francesco de Fabiani (ITA)	DNS-3
Michael Hellweger (ITA)	DNS-2

Kazakhstan
Skier	Pos.
Denis Volotka (KAZ)	50
Vladislav Kovalyov (KAZ)	52
Nail Bashmakov (KAZ)	55
Vitaliy Pukhkalo (KAZ)	DNS-4
Asset Dyussenov (KAZ)	DNS-3

Latvia
Skier	Pos.
Indulis Bikse (LAT)	49

Norway^{TEAM}
Skier	Pos.
Johannes Høsflot Klæbo (NOR)	3
Sjur Røthe (NOR)	4
Simen Hegstad Krüger (NOR)	5
Pål Golberg (NOR)	6
Jan Thomas Jenssen (NOR)	18
Hans Christer Holund (NOR)	DNS-6
Martin Løwstrøm Nyenget (NOR)	DNS-4
Didrik Tønseth (NOR)	DNS-3
Erik Valnes (NOR)	DNF-3
Emil Iversen (NOR)	DNS-2

Poland
Skier	Pos.
Dominik Bury (POL)	24
Kamil Bury (POL)	42
Maciej Starega (POL)	DNS-2

Republic of Ireland
Skier	Pos.
Thomas Maloney Westgård (IRL)	48

Romania
Skier	Pos.
Paul Constantin Pepene (ROU)	34

Russia
Skier	Pos.
Alexander Bolshunov (RUS)	1
Sergey Ustiugov (RUS)	2
Andrey Melnichenko (RUS)	8
Artem Maltsev (RUS)	9
Denis Spitsov (RUS)	11
Andrey Larkov (RUS)	13
Ivan Yakimushkin (RUS)	17
Gleb Retivykh (RUS)	44

Spain
Skier	Pos.
Imanol Rojo (SPA)	37

Slovenia
Skier	Pos.
Miha Šimenc (SVN)	54

Slovakia
Skier	Pos.
Ján Koristek (SVK)	53

Sweden
Skier	Pos.
Jens Burman (SWE)	12
Calle Halfvarsson (SWE)	15
Karl-Johan Westberg (SWE)	30
Johan Häggström (SWE)	31
Oskar Svensson (SWE)	39
Björn Sandström (SWE)	DNS-6
Axel Ekström (SWE)	DNS-3

Switzerland
Skier	Pos.
Dario Cologna (SUI)	7
Jonas Baumann (SUI)	20
Roman Furger (SUI)	27
Beda Klee (SUI)	28
Ueli Schnider (SUI)	33
Jason Rüesch (SUI)	40
Livio Bieler (SUI)	DNS-4
Erwan Käser (SUI)	DNS-4
Toni Livers (SUI)	DNS-4
Jovian Hediger (SUI)	DNS-2

Thailand
Skier	Pos.
Mark Chanloung (THA)	DNS-2

United States
Skier	Pos.
David Norris (USA)	35
Logan Hanneman (USA)	56
Kevin Bolger (USA)	DNS-4

==== Women ====
Australia
Skier	Pos.
Jessica Yeaton (AUS)	38

Austria
Skier	Pos.
Teresa Stadlober (AUT)	6
Lisa Unterweger (AUT)	DNS-6

Belarus
Skier	Pos.
Polina Seronosova (BLR)	39

Croatia
Skier	Pos.
Vedrana Malec (CRO)	DNS-3

Czech Republic
Skier	Pos.
Kateřina Janatová (CZE)	27
Petra Nováková (CZE)	DNS-3
Sandra Schützová (CZE)	DNS-3
Kateřina Razýmová (CZE)	DNS-2

Finland
Skier	Pos.
Kerttu Niskanen (FIN)	11
Anne Kyllönen (FIN)	13
Vilma Nissinen (FIN)	31

France
Skier	Pos.
Delphine Claudel (FRA)	23
Enora Latuilliere (FRA)	DNS-2
Laura Chamiot Maitral (FRA)	DNS-2
Richard Jouve (FRA)	DNS-3
Lucas Chanavat (FRA)	DNS-1

Germany
Skier	Pos.
Katharina Hennig (GER)	8
Antonia Fräbel (GER)	36
Victoria Carl (GER)	DNS-5
Sofie Krehl (GER)	DNS-4
Pia Fink (GER)	DNS-2
Laura Gimmler (GER)	DNS-2

Italy
Skier	Pos.
Anna Comarella (ITA)	18
Elisa Brocard (ITA)	37
Lucia Scardoni (ITA)	DNS-6
Caterina Ganz (ITA)	DNS-4
Ilaria Debertolis (ITA)	DNS-3
Greta Laurent (ITA)	DNS-2
Francesca Franchi (ITA)	DNF-1

Kazakhstan
Skier	Pos.
Valeriya Tyuleneva (KAZ)	30
Anna Shevchenko (KAZ)	34
Irina Bykova (KAZ)	40
Kseniya Shalygina (KAZ)	41

Latvia
Skier	Pos.
Patricija Eiduka (LAT)	DNS-3

Norway^{TEAM}
Skier	Pos.
Therese Johaug (NOR)	1
Ingvild Flugstad Østberg (NOR)	3
Heidi Weng (NOR)	4
Astrid Uhrenholdt Jacobsen (NOR)	5
Tiril Udnes Weng (NOR)	10
Anne Kjersti Kalvå (NOR)	16
Ragnhild Haga (NOR)	17
Magni Smedås (NOR)	20
Kari Øyre Slind (NOR)	DNS-5
Maiken Caspersen Falla (NOR)	DNS-2

Poland
Skier	Pos.
Izabela Marcisz (POL)	DNS-3
Weronika Kaleta (POL)	DNS-3
Monika Skinder (POL)	DNF-1

Russia
Skier	Pos.
Natalya Nepryayeva (RUS)	2
Yana Kirpichenko (RUS)	21
Alisa Zhambalova (RUS)	24
Lidia Durkina (RUS)	26
Anna Nechaevskaya (RUS)	29
Diana Golovan (RUS)	33
Anna Zherebyateva (RUS)	35

Slovenia
Skier	Pos.
Anamarija Lampič (SVN)	19
Vesna Fabjan (SVN)	DNS-3
Katja Visnar (SVN)	DNS-2
Anita Klemenčič (SVN)	DNS-2

Slovakia
Skier	Pos.
Alena Procházková (SVK)	DNS

Sweden
Skier	Pos.
Charlotte Kalla (SWE)	12
Jonna Sundling (SWE)	14
Elina Rönnlund (SWE)	22
Maja Dahlqvist (SWE)	32
Ebba Andersson (SWE)	DNS-6
Moa Lundgren (SWE)	DNS-4
Emma Ribom (SWE)	DNS-2
Stina Nilsson (SWE)	DNS-1

Switzerland
Skier	Pos.
Laurien van der Graaff (SUI)	25
Lydia Hiernickel (SUI)	DNS-4
Nadine Fähndrich (SUI)	DNS-3
Selina Gasparin (SUI)	DNS-2

Thailand
Skier	Pos.
Karen Chanloung (THA)	DNS-2

United States
Skier	Pos.
Sadie Maubet Bjornsen (USA)	7
Jessie Diggins (USA)	9
Rosie Brennan (USA)	15
Katharine Ogden (USA)	28
Sophie Caldwell (USA)	DNS-4
Julia Kern (USA)	DNS-2

=== By nationality ===
The 163 skiers that competed in the 2019–20 Tour de Ski; 86 men and 77 women, originated from 25 different countries.

Country
Country	Men			Women			Total			
Country	No. of skiers	Finishers	Stage wins	No. of skiers	Finishers	Stage wins	No. of skiers	Finishers	Stage wins	
Country	Andorra	1	1					1	1	
Country	Australia				1	1		1	1	
Country	Austria	1			2	1		3	1	
Country	Belarus	1	1		1	1		2	2	
Country	Croatia				1			1		
Country	Czech Republic	3	2		4	1		7	3	
Country	Finland	4	4		3	3		7	7	
Country	France	9	5		3	1		12	6	
Country	Germany	5	2		6	2		11	4	
Country	Great Britain	2	1					2	1	
Country	Italy	7	3		7	2		14	5	
Country	Kazakhstan	5	3		4	4		9	7	
Country	Latvia	1	1		1			2	1	
Country	Norway	10	5	4 (Johannes Høsflot Klæbo x3, Simen Hegstad Krüger)	10	8	(Therese Johaug x3, Ingvild Flugstad Østberg, Astrid Uhrenholdt Jacobsen)	20	13	9
Country	Poland	3	2		3			6	2	
Country	Republic of Ireland	1	1					1	1	
Country	Romania	1	1					1	1	
Country	Russia	8	8	3 (Sergey Ustiugov x2, Alexander Bolshunov)	7	7		15	15	3
Country	Slovenia	1	1		4	1	2 (Anamarija Lampič x2)	5	2	2
Country	Slovakia	1	1		1			2	1	
Country	Spain	1	1					1	1	
Country	Sweden	7	5		8	4		15	9	
Switzerland	10	6		4	1		14	7		
Thailand	1			1			2			
United States	3	2		6	4		9	6		
Total	86	56	7	77	41	7	163	97	14	
