= 2019–20 Tour de Ski =

Cross-country skiing event

Tour de Ski
2019–20 FIS Cross-Country World Cup

Ski tour details
- Venue(s): Lenzerheide, Switzerland; Toblach, Italy; Val di Fiemme, Italy
- Dates: 28 December 2019 – 5 January 2020
- Stages: 7

Results
Men
Jersey awarded to the men's overall winner	Winner	Alexander Bolshunov (RUS)
	Second	Sergey Ustiugov (RUS)
	Third	Johannes Høsflot Klæbo (NOR)
Jersey awarded to the men's points classification winner	Points	Johannes Høsflot Klæbo (NOR)
Women
Jersey awarded to the women's overall winner	Winner	Therese Johaug (NOR)
	Second	Natalya Nepryayeva (RUS)
	Third	Ingvild Flugstad Østberg (NOR)
Jersey awarded to the women's points classification winner	Points	Anamarija Lampič (SLO)

The 2019–20 Tour de Ski was the 14th edition of the Tour de Ski and part of the 2019–20 FIS Cross-Country World Cup. The World Cup stage event began in Lenzerheide, Switzerland on 28 December 2019 and concluded with the Final Climb stage in Val di Fiemme, Italy, on 5 January 2020. The tour was the third tour starting in Lenzerheide. The last stage known as the Final Climb was held as a mass start for the first time. A points standing replaced the sprint standing from previous editions.

Alexander Bolshunov became the overall winner, surpassing Sergey Ustiugov and Johannes Høsflot Klæbo. He became the third Russian to win the Tour de Ski. In the women's event the overall winner became Therese Johaug, who won the third Tour de Ski cup in her career. Natalya Nepryayeva was second and defending champion Ingvild Flugstad Østberg finished third.

== Schedule ==
Stage	Venue	Date	Event	Technique	Distance		Start time (CET)	
Stage	Venue	Date	Event	Technique	Women	Men	Women	Men
1	Lenzerheide (SUI)	28 December 2019	Distance, mass start	Freestyle	10 km	15 km	12:45	14:15
2	Lenzerheide (SUI)	29 December 2019	Sprint	Freestyle	1.5 km	1.5 km	11:20	11:20
3	Toblach (ITA)	31 December 2019	Distance, interval start	Freestyle	10 km	15 km	15:00	12:30
4	Toblach (ITA)	1 January 2020	Distance, pursuit	Classic	10 km	15 km	11:40	13:00
5	Val di Fiemme (ITA)	3 January 2020	Distance, mass start	Classic	10 km	15 km	13:15	15:15
6	Val di Fiemme (ITA)	4 January 2020	Sprint	Classic	1.3 km	1.5 km	11:25	11:25
7	Val di Fiemme (ITA)	5 January 2020	Final Climb, mass start	Freestyle	10 km	10 km	13:15	15:15

== Overall leadership ==
Two main individual classifications were contested in the 2019–20 Tour de Ski, as well as a team competition. The most important was the overall standings, calculated by adding each skier's finishing times on each stage. Time bonuses (time subtracted) were awarded at both sprint stages and at intermediate points during mass start stages. In the sprint stages, the winners were awarded 60 bonus seconds, while on mass start stages the first ten skiers past the intermediate point received from 15 seconds to 1 seconds. The skier with the lowest cumulative time would be the overall winner of the Tour de Ski. For the first time in Tour history, the skier leading the overall standings would wear a yellow bib.

Bonus seconds for the top 30 positions by type
Type		1	2	3	4	5	6	7	8	9	10	11	12	13–15	16–20	21–25	26–30
In finish	Interval start	none															
In finish	Mass start	none															
In finish	Pursuit	none															
In finish	Sprint	60	54	48	46	44	42	32	30	28	26	24	22	10	8	6	4
Intermediate sprint	Stage 5 (Mass Start)	15	12	10	8	6	5	4	3	2	1	none					

The second competition was the points standings, which replaced the sprint competition from past editions. The skiers who received the highest number of points during the Tour would win the points standings. The points available for each stage finish were determined by the stage's type. The leader was identified by a red bib.

Points standings points for the top 10 positions by type
Type		1	2	3	4	5	6	7	8	9	10
In finish
In finish	Pursuit	15	12	10	8	6	5	4	3	2	1
In finish	Sprint	30	24	20	16	12	10	8	6	4	2
Intermediate sprint	Interval start (1st IT)	15	12	10	8	6	5	4	3	2	1
Intermediate sprint	Mass start	15	12	10	8	6	5	4	3	2	1

The final competition was a team competition. This was calculated using the finishing times of the best two skiers of both genders per team on each stage; the leading team was the team with the lowest cumulative time.

A total of CHF 560,000, both genders included, was awarded in cash prizes in the race. The overall winners of the Tour de Ski received CHF 55,000, with the second and third placed skiers getting CHF 40,000 and CHF 27,500 respectively. All finishers in the top 20 were awarded money. The holders of the overall and points standings would benefit on each stage they led; the final winners of the points standings would be given CHF 6,000. CHF 3,000 was given to the winners of each stage of the race, with smaller amounts given to places 2 and 3.

Overall leadership by stage
Stage	Men			Women		
Stage	Winner	Overall standings	Points standings	Winner	Overall standings	Points standings
1	Sergey Ustiugov	Sergey Ustiugov	Johannes Høsflot Klæbo	Therese Johaug	Therese Johaug	Therese Johaug
2	Johannes Høsflot Klæbo	Johannes Høsflot Klæbo	Johannes Høsflot Klæbo	Anamarija Lampič	Natalya Nepryayeva	Anamarija Lampič
3	Sergey Ustiugov	Sergey Ustiugov	Johannes Høsflot Klæbo	Therese Johaug	Therese Johaug	Anamarija Lampič
4	Alexander Bolshunov	Alexander Bolshunov	Johannes Høsflot Klæbo	Ingvild Flugstad Østberg	Therese Johaug	Anamarija Lampič
5	Johannes Høsflot Klæbo	Alexander Bolshunov	Johannes Høsflot Klæbo	Astrid Uhrenholdt Jacobsen	Therese Johaug	Natalya Nepryayeva
6	Johannes Høsflot Klæbo	Johannes Høsflot Klæbo	Johannes Høsflot Klæbo	Anamarija Lampič	Therese Johaug	Anamarija Lampič
7	Simen Hegstad Krüger	Alexander Bolshunov	Johannes Høsflot Klæbo	Therese Johaug	Therese Johaug	Anamarija Lampič
Final		Alexander Bolshunov	Johannes Høsflot Klæbo	Final	Therese Johaug	Anamarija Lampič

== Final standings ==
Legend
Denotes the winner of the Overall standings	Denotes the winner of the Points standings

=== Overall standings ===
==== Men ====
Final overall standings (1–10)
Rank	Name	Time
1	Alexander Bolshunov (RUS)	2:58:18.1
2	Sergey Ustiugov (RUS)	+27.3
3	Johannes Høsflot Klæbo (NOR)	+1:09.0
4	Sjur Røthe (NOR)	+1:51.6
5	Simen Hegstad Krüger (NOR)	+2:53.7
6	Pål Golberg (NOR)	+2:55.7
7	Dario Cologna (SUI)	+3:08.7
8	Andrey Melnichenko (RUS)	+3:17.5
9	Artem Maltsev (RUS)	+3:32.8
10	Iivo Niskanen (FIN)	+3:39.2

Final overall standings (11–56)
Rank	Name	Time
11	Denis Spitsov (RUS)	+3:56.9
12	Jens Burman (SWE)	+4:04.1
13	Andrey Larkov (RUS)	+4:24.4
14	Perttu Hyvärinen (FIN)	+4:27.1
15	Calle Halfvarsson (SWE)	+4:40.1
16	Lucas Bögl (GER)	+5:13.8
17	Ivan Yakimushkin (RUS)	+5:15.3
18	Jan Thomas Jenssen (NOR)	+5:22.4
19	Adrien Backscheider (FRA)	+6:15.4
20	Jonas Baumann (SUI)	+6:22.3
21	Clément Parisse (FRA)	+6:33.9
22	Jean-Marc Gaillard (FRA)	+6:45.2
23	Irineu Esteve Altimiras (AND)	+6:52.5
24	Dominik Bury (POL)	+7:18.0
25	Sebastian Eisenlauer (GER)	+7:48.3
26	Maurice Manificat (FRA)	+7:55.7
27	Roman Furger (SUI)	+8:06.7
28	Beda Klee (SUI)	+8:10.4
29	Giandomenico Salvadori (ITA)	+8:27.8
30	Karl-Johan Westberg (SWE)	+8:36.0
31	Johan Häggström (SWE)	+9:03.7
32	Andrew Musgrave (GBR)	+9:19.6
33	Ueli Schnider (SUI)	+10:08.5
34	Paul Constantin Pepene (ROU)	+10:15.5
35	David Norris (USA)	+10:18.1
36	Hugo Lapalus (FRA)	+10:26.0
37	Imanol Rojo (ESP)	+10:48.2
38	Lari Lehtonen (FIN)	+10:50.6
39	Oskar Svensson (SWE)	+11:01.6
40	Jason Rüesch (SUI)	+11:08.3
41	Petr Knop (CZE)	+11:23.4
42	Kamil Bury (POL)	+11:41.8
43	Lauri Lepistö (FIN)	+13:17.3
44	Gleb Retivykh (RUS)	+13:33.7
45	Mikael Abram (ITA)	+13:57.8
46	Michail Semenov (BLR)	+14:15.8
47	Adam Fellner (CZE)	+14:23.1
48	Thomas Maloney Westgård (IRL)	+14:53.7
49	Indulis Bikše (LAT)	+16:13.7
50	Denis Volotka (KAZ)	+16:30.6
51	Maicol Rastelli (ITA)	+16:30.7
52	Vladislav Kovalyov (KAZ)	+17:20.1
53	Ján Koristek (SVK)	+17:38.6
54	Miha Šimenc (SLO)	+18:06.3
55	Nail Bashmakov (KAZ)	+18:13.5
56	Logan Hanneman (USA)	+20:05.5

==== Women ====
Final overall standings (1–10)
Rank	Name	Time
1	Therese Johaug (NOR)	2:28:18.6
2	Natalya Nepryayeva (RUS)	+1:11.1
3	Ingvild Flugstad Østberg (NOR)	+1:17.5
4	Heidi Weng (NOR)	+1:37.3
5	Astrid Uhrenholdt Jacobsen (NOR)	+2:13.4
6	Teresa Stadlober (AUT)	+4:34.1
7	Sadie Maubet Bjornsen (USA)	+4:40.6
8	Katharina Hennig (GER)	+4:40.9
9	Jessie Diggins (USA)	+4:44.1
10	Tiril Udnes Weng (NOR)	+5:07.1

Final overall standings (11–41)
Rank	Name	Time
11	Kerttu Niskanen (FIN)	+5:42.0
12	Charlotte Kalla (SWE)	+6:00.7
13	Anne Kyllönen (FIN)	+6:50.1
14	Jonna Sundling (SWE)	+6:56.4
15	Rosie Brennan (USA)	+7:11.0
16	Anne Kjersti Kalvå (NOR)	+7:31.0
17	Ragnhild Haga (NOR)	+7:59.5
18	Anna Comarella (ITA)	+9:17.0
19	Anamarija Lampič (SLO)	+9:38.8
20	Magni Smedås (NOR)	+9:59.8
21	Yana Kirpichenko (RUS)	+10:02.2
22	Elina Rönnlund (SWE)	+10:47.0
23	Delphine Claudel (FRA)	+10:58.5
24	Alisa Zhambalova (RUS)	+11:11.2
25	Laurien van der Graaff (SUI)	+11:52.5
26	Lidia Durkina (RUS)	+12:12.2
27	Kateřina Janatová (CZE)	+12:19.6
28	Katharine Ogden (USA)	+12:26.5
29	Anna Nechaevskaya (RUS)	+13:06.7
30	Valentina Tyuleneva (KAZ)	+13:50.1
31	Vilma Nissinen (FIN)	+15:00.9
32	Maja Dahlqvist (SWE)	+15:23.7
33	Diana Golovan (RUS)	+15:39.5
34	Anna Shevchenko (KAZ)	+15:54.0
35	Anna Zherebyateva (RUS)	+16:11.1
36	Antonia Fräbel (GER)	+16:18.1
37	Elisa Brocard (ITA)	+16:24.6
38	Jessica Yeaton (AUS)	+16:45.7
39	Polina Seronosova (BLR)	+17:52.4
40	Irina Bykova (KAZ)	+19:18.3
41	Kseniya Shalygina (KAZ)	+21:03.2

=== Points standings ===
==== Men ====
Final points standings (1–10)
Rank	Name	Points
1	Johannes Høsflot Klæbo (NOR)	117
2	Alexander Bolshunov (RUS)	89
3	Sergey Ustiugov (RUS)	87
4	Gleb Retivykh (RUS)	67
5	Pål Golberg (NOR)	37
6	Andrey Melnichenko (RUS)	35
7	Artem Maltsev (RUS)	23
8	Iivo Niskanen (FIN)	18
9	Sjur Røthe (NOR)	17
10	Johan Häggström (SWE)	17

==== Women ====
Final points standings (1–10)
Rank	Name	Points
1	Anamarija Lampič (SLO)	90
2	Natalya Nepryayeva (RUS)	76
3	Jessie Diggins (USA)	72
4	Therese Johaug (NOR)	66
5	Heidi Weng (NOR)	61
6	Astrid Uhrenholdt Jacobsen (NOR)	59
7	Ingvild Flugstad Østberg (NOR)	50
8	Sadie Maubet Bjornsen (USA)	34
9	Katharina Hennig (GER)	15
10	Tiril Udnes Weng (NOR)	12

=== Team standings ===
Final team standings (1–5)
Rank	Nation	Time
1	Norway	10:50:25.0
2	Russia	+12:10.1
3	Sweden	+17:49.3
4	Finland	+23:21.8
5	Germany	+30:08.5

== Stages ==
=== Stage 1 ===
28 December 2019, Lenzerheide, Switzerland

- No bonus seconds were awarded on this stage.

Men – 15 km Freestyle (mass start)
Rank	Name	Time
1	Sergey Ustiugov (RUS)	33.19.1
2	Johannes Høsflot Klæbo (NOR)	+4.0
3	Alexander Bolshunov (RUS)	+4.0
4	Emil Iversen (NOR)	+7.2
5	Martin Løwstrøm Nyenget (NOR)	+8.6
6	Dario Cologna (SUI)	+8.7
7	Hans Christer Holund (NOR)	+8.8
8	Jan Thomas Jenssen (NOR)	+8.9
9	Sjur Røthe (NOR)	+9.0
10	Simen Hegstad Krüger (NOR)	+10.0

Women – 10 km Freestyle (mass start)
Rank	Name	Time
1	Therese Johaug (NOR)	28:12:1
2	Heidi Weng (NOR)	+12.3
3	Ebba Andersson (SWE)	+12.9
4	Ingvild Flugstad Østberg (NOR)	+13.1
5	Astrid Uhrenholdt Jacobsen (NOR)	+24.1
6	Natalya Nepryayeva (RUS)	+40.1
7	Tiril Udnes Weng (NOR)	+40.6
8	Moa Lundgren (SWE)	+41.3
9	Charlotte Kalla (SWE)	+41.9
10	Kerttu Niskanen (FIN)	+42.0

=== Stage 2 ===
29 December 2019, Lenzerheide, Switzerland

- Bonus seconds to the 30 skiers that qualifies for the quarter-finals, distributed as following:
  - Final: 60–54–48–46–44–42
  - Semi-final: 32–30–28–26–24–22
  - Quarter-final: 10–10–10–8–8–8–8–8–6–6–6–6–6–4–4–4–4–4

Men – 1.5 km Sprint Freestyle
Rank	Name	QT	Time	BS
1	Johannes Høsflot Klæbo (NOR)	2:44.64 (1)	2:55.33	60
2	Federico Pellegrino (ITA)	2:45.84 (2)	+0.35	54
3	Richard Jouve (FRA)	2:49.91 (13)	+0.57	48
4	Gleb Retivykh (RUS)	2:49.28 (11)	+0.86	46
5	Johan Häggström (SWE)	2:48.32 (8)	+0.94	44
6	Pål Golberg (NOR)	2:46.65 (5)	+2.16	42
7	Erik Valnes (NOR)	2:46.70 (6)	SF	32
8	Alexander Bolshunov (RUS)	2:46.61 (4)	SF	30
9	Jovian Hediger (SUI)	2:46.34 (3)	SF	28
10	Renaud Jay (FRA)	2:50.66 (17)	SF	26

Women – 1.5 km Sprint Freestyle
Rank	Name	QT	Time	BS
1	Anamarija Lampič (SLO)	3:17.69 (20)	3:06.02	60
2	Maiken Caspersen Falla (NOR)	3:12.64 (6)	+0.03	54
3	Natalya Nepryayeva (RUS)	3:14.44 (12)	+0.47	48
4	Jessie Diggins (USA)	3:11.23 (3)	+1.03	46
5	Sadie Maubet Bjornsen (USA)	3:11.43 (4)	+4.78	44
6	Tiril Udnes Weng (NOR)	3:16.70 (17)	+5.29	42
7	Anne Kjersti Kalvå (NOR)	3:14.95 (13)	SF	32
8	Emma Ribom (SWE)	3:17.80 (22)	SF	30
9	Sophie Caldwell (USA)	3:10.76 (1)	SF	28
10	Moa Lundgren (SWE)	3:14.02 (8)	SF	26

=== Stage 3 ===
31 December 2019, Toblach, Italy

- No bonus seconds were awarded on this stage.

Men – 15 km Freestyle (individual)
Rank	Name	Time
1	Sergey Ustiugov (RUS)	31:02.5
2	Ivan Yakimushkin (RUS)	+22.6
3	Alexander Bolshunov (RUS)	+29.0
4	Calle Halfvarsson (SWE)	+29.6
5	Hans Christer Holund (NOR)	+34.6
6	Artem Maltsev (RUS)	+35.2
7	Andrey Melnichenko (RUS)	+37.0
8	Sjur Røthe (NOR)	+39.4
9	Lucas Bögl (GER)	+42.6
10	Denis Spitsov (RUS)	+43.1

Women – 10 km Freestyle (individual)
Rank	Name	Time
1	Therese Johaug (NOR)	23:51.9
2	Ingvild Flugstad Østberg (NOR)	+0.7
3	Ebba Andersson (SWE)	+10.2
4	Heidi Weng (NOR)	+10.5
5	Astrid Uhrenholdt Jacobsen (NOR)	+20.8
6	Natalya Nepryayeva (RUS)	+26.0
7	Jessie Diggins (USA)	+35.6
8	Sadie Maubet Bjornsen (USA)	+42.9
9	Rosie Brennan (USA)	+45.0
10	Katharina Hennig (GER)	+53.1

=== Stage 4 ===
1 January 2020, Toblach, Italy

- Pursuit start lists were based only on Stage 3 results (not as in the past on the current Tour de Ski overall standing). In fact, stage 4 finish differences are combined results of stages 3 and 4
- No bonus seconds were awarded on this stage.

Men – 15 km Classic (pursuit)
Rank	Name	Time
1	Alexander Bolshunov (RUS)	38:14.9
2	Sergey Ustiugov (RUS)	+13.7
3	Iivo Niskanen (FIN)	+24.8
4	Artem Maltsev (RUS)	+29.2
5	Calle Halfvarsson (SWE)	+29.6
6	Sjur Røthe (NOR)	+29.8
7	Hans Christer Holund (NOR)	+30.7
8	Lucas Bögl (GER)	+47.9
9	Ivan Yakimushkin (RUS)	+55.9
10	Johannes Høsflot Klæbo (NOR)	+57.2

Women – 10 km Classic (pursuit)
Rank	Name	Time
1	Ingvild Flugstad Østberg (NOR)	26:51.5
2	Therese Johaug (NOR)	+0.4
3	Heidi Weng (NOR)	+27.2
4	Natalya Nepryayeva (RUS)	+27.3
5	Astrid Uhrenholdt Jacobsen (NOR)	+27.7
6	Ebba Andersson (SWE)	+28.1
7	Anamarija Lampič (SLO)	+1.29.4
8	Teresa Stadlober (AUT)	+1.29.8
9	Katharina Hennig (GER)	+1.30.1
10	Charlotte Kalla (SWE)	+1.30.6

=== Stage 5 ===
3 January 2020, Val di Fiemme, Italy

Men – 15 km Classic (mass start)
Rank	Name	Time	BS
1	Johannes Høsflot Klæbo (NOR)	39:51.0	15
2	Sergey Ustiugov (RUS)	+0.7	2
3	Alexander Bolshunov (RUS)	+1.0	8
4	Andrey Larkov (RUS)	+4.4	5
5	Sjur Røthe (NOR)	+10.2	12
6	Dario Cologna (SUI)	+11.0	4
7	Denis Spitsov (RUS)	+13.7	
8	Hans Christer Holund (NOR)	+15.8	6
9	Calle Halfvarsson (SWE)	+18.1	1
10	Iivo Niskanen (FIN)	+18.4	3

Women – 10 km Classic (mass start)
Rank	Name	Time	BS
1	Astrid Uhrenholdt Jacobsen (NOR)	29:07.9	15
2	Ebba Andersson (SWE)	+0.4	12
3	Katharina Hennig (GER)	+1.0	10
4	Therese Johaug (NOR)	+6.2	5
5	Ingvild Flugstad Østberg (NOR)	+6.8	8
6	Natalya Nepryayeva (RUS)	+15.5	4
7	Sadie Maubet Bjornsen (USA)	+17.2	3
8	Heidi Weng (NOR)	+19.0	6
9	Jonna Sundling (SWE)	+25.0	1
10	Tiril Udnes Weng (NOR)	+26.6	2

==== Stage 5 bonus seconds ====
- Men: 1 intermediate sprint, bonus seconds to the 10 first skiers (15–12–10–8–6–5–4–3–2–1) past the intermediate point.
- Women: 1 intermediate sprint, bonus seconds to the 10 first skiers (15–12–10–8–6–5–4–3–2–1) past the intermediate point.
- No bonus seconds were awarded at the finish

Bonus seconds (Stage 5 – Men)
Name	Point 1
Johannes Høsflot Klæbo (NOR)	15
Sjur Røthe (NOR)	12
Simen Hegstad Krüger (NOR)	10
Alexander Bolshunov (RUS)	8
Hans Christer Holund (NOR)	6
Andrey Larkov (RUS)	5
Dario Cologna (SUI)	4
Iivo Niskanen (FIN)	3
Sergey Ustiugov (RUS)	2
Calle Halfvarsson (SWE)	1

Bonus seconds (Stage 5 – Women)
Name	Point 1
Astrid Uhrenholdt Jacobsen (NOR)	15
Ebba Andersson (SWE)	12
Katharina Hennig (GER)	10
Ingvild Flugstad Østberg (NOR)	8
Heidi Weng (NOR)	6
Therese Johaug (NOR)	5
Natalya Nepryayeva (RUS)	4
Sadie Maubet Bjornsen (USA)	3
Tiril Udnes Weng (NOR)	2
Jonna Sundling (SWE)	1

=== Stage 6 ===
4 January 2020, Val di Fiemme, Italy

- Bonus seconds to the 30 skiers that qualifies for the quarter-finals, distributed as following:
  - Final: 60–54–48–46–44–42
  - Semi-final: 32–30–28–26–24–22
  - Quarter-final: 10–10–10–8–8–8–8–8–6–6–6–6–6–4–4–4–4–4

Men – 1.5 km Sprint Classic
Rank	Name	QT	Time	BS
1	Johannes Høsflot Klæbo (NOR)	3:02.17 (1)	3:03.78	60
2	Sergey Ustiugov (RUS)	3:08.87 (4)	+0.70	54
3	Alexander Bolshunov (RUS)	3:09.28 (5)	+1.33	48
4	Pål Golberg (NOR)	3:08.27 (3)	+2.01	46
5	Gleb Retivykh (RUS)	3:13.68 (12)	+6.30	44
6	Andrey Melnichenko (RUS)	3:15.84 (22)	+8.69	42
7	Jan Thomas Jenssen (NOR)	3:14.09 (15)	SF	32
8	Miha Šimenc (SLO)	3:15.93 (23)	SF	30
9	Iivo Niskanen (FIN)	3:15.16 (17)	SF	28
10	Denis Spitsov (RUS)	3:15.65 (21)	SF	26

Women – 1.3 km Sprint Classic
Rank	Name	QT	Time	BS
1	Anamarija Lampič (SLO)	3:07.99 (12)	3:03.03	60
2	Astrid Uhrenholdt Jacobsen (NOR)	3:07.13 (7)	+0.22	54
3	Jessie Diggins (USA)	3:04.26 (1)	+0.28	48
4	Sadie Maubet Bjornsen (USA)	3:05.69 (4)	+0.80	46
5	Lucia Scardoni (ITA)	3:04.74 (2)	+1.12	44
6	Natalya Nepryayeva (RUS)	3:07.09 (6)	+15.30	42
7	Anne Kyllönen (FIN)	3:06.01 (5)	SF	32
8	Heidi Weng (NOR)	3:11.96 (18)	SF	30
9	Jonna Sundling (SWE)	3:05.66 (3)	SF	28
10	Maja Dahlqvist (SWE)	3:07.70 (11)	SF	26

=== Stage 7 ===
5 January 2020, Val di Fiemme, Italy

The race for "Fastest of the Day" counts for 2019–20 FIS Cross-Country World Cup points. No bonus seconds are awarded on this stage.

Men – 10 km Final Climb Freestyle (mass start)
Rank	Name	Time
1	Simen Hegstad Krüger (NOR)	30:55.8
2	Sjur Røthe (NOR)	+13.9
3	Alexander Bolshunov (RUS)	+22.3
4	Denis Spitsov (RUS)	+26.2
5	Sergey Ustiugov (RUS)	+35.6
6	Dario Cologna (SUI)	+41.0
7	Andrey Melnichenko (RUS)	+44.8
8	Irineu Esteve Altimiras (AND)	+47.8
9	Andrey Larkov (RUS)	+53.7
10	Hugo Lapalus (FRA)	+59.3

Women – 10 km Freestyle (mass start)
Rank	Name	Time
1	Therese Johaug (NOR)	34:21.6
2	Heidi Weng (NOR)	+50.3
3	Ingvild Flugstad Østberg (NOR)	+54.5
4	Natalya Nepryayeva (RUS)	+57.1
5	Teresa Stadlober (AUT)	+1:15.1
6	Jessie Diggins (USA)	+1:51.1
7	Rosie Brennan (USA)	+1:58.0
8	Ragnhild Haga (NOR)	+2:06.5
9	Astrid Uhrenholdt Jacobsen (NOR)	+2:10.4
10	Katharina Hennig (GER)	+2:12.9

== World Cup points distribution ==
The table shows the number of 2019–20 FIS Cross-Country World Cup points won in the 2019–20 Tour de Ski for men and women.

Place	1	2	3	4	5	6	7	8	9	10	11	12	13	14	15	16	17	18	19	20	21	22	23	24	25	26	27	28	29	30	31 - 40	>40
Overall Standings	400	320	240	200	180	160	144	128	116	104	96	88	80	72	64	60	56	52	48	44	40	36	32	28	24	20	20	20	20	20	10	5
Each Stage	50	46	43	40	37	34	32	30	28	26	24	22	20	18	16	15	14	13	12	11	10	9	8	7	6	5	4	3	2	1

== Sources ==
- "RULES FOR THE FIS CROSS-COUNTRY WORLD CUP 2020/2021" (PDF). International Ski Federation.
