= Lampič =

Lampič is a surname. Notable people with the surname include:

- Anamarija Lampič (born 1995), Slovenian cross-country skier
- Janez Lampič (born 1963), Yugoslav cyclist
- Janez Lampič (skier) (born 1996), Slovenian cross-country skier
