= David Norris =

David Norris may refer to:

== Sports ==
- David Norris (diver) (1920–1972), Australian diver
- Dave Norris (athlete) (born 1939), New Zealand athlete
- David Norris (cricketer) (born 1946), English cricketer
- David Norris (speedway rider) (born 1972), former British international speedway rider
- David Norris (footballer) (born 1981), English footballer
- Bud Norris or David Norris (born 1985), American baseball player
- David Norris (skier) (born 1990), American cross country skier in the 2019–20 Tour de Ski

== Other people ==
- David Norris (Royal Navy officer) (1875–1937), British admiral
- David Norris (politician) (born 1944), Irish senator, civil rights activist, James Joyce scholar and former presidential candidate
- David Owen Norris (born 1953), British pianist and broadcaster
- David Norris, convicted of the murder of Stephen Lawrence
- David Norris, protagonist in The Adjustment Bureau
