= FIS Nordic World Ski Championships 2019 – Men's sprint =

Men's sprint at the FIS Nordic World Ski Championships 2019
- Location: Seefeld in Tirol, Austria
- Dates: 21 February
- Competitors: 145 from 52 nations
- Winning time: 3:21.17

Medalists
gold medal	Johannes Høsflot Klæbo	Norway
silver medal	Federico Pellegrino	Italy
bronze medal	Gleb Retivykh	Russia

The Men's sprint competition at the FIS Nordic World Ski Championships 2019 was held on 21 February 2019.

== Results ==
=== Qualification ===
The qualification was held at 12:50.

Rank	Bib	Athlete	Country	Time	Deficit	Notes
1	7	Viktor Thorn	Sweden	2:55.58		Q
2	5	Sergey Ustiugov	Russia	2:55.58	+0.00	Q
3	4	Finn Hågen Krogh	Norway	2:56.11	+0.53	Q
4	6	Calle Halfvarsson	Sweden	2:56.11	+0.53	Q
5	16	Johannes Høsflot Klæbo	Norway	2:56.49	+0.91	Q
6	8	Federico Pellegrino	Italy	2:56.49	+0.91	Q
7	18	Emil Iversen	Norway	2:56.77	+1.19	Q
8	21	Joni Mäki	Finland	2:57.82	+2.24	Q
9	14	Francesco De Fabiani	Italy	2:57.95	+2.37	Q
10	15	Lucas Chanavat	France	2:57.96	+2.38	Q
11	11	Simi Hamilton	United States	2:58.48	+2.90	Q
12	31	James Clugnet	Great Britain	2:58.66	+3.08	Q
13	2	Sindre Bjørnestad Skar	Norway	2:58.96	+3.38	Q
14	20	Gleb Retivykh	Russia	2:59.18	+3.60	Q
15	24	Richard Jouve	France	2:59.21	+3.63	Q
16	17	Oskar Svensson	Sweden	2:59.30	+3.72	Q
17	9	Andrew Young	Great Britain	2:59.54	+3.96	Q
18	10	Alex Harvey	Canada	2:59.64	+4.06	Q
19	40	Artem Maltsev	Russia	3:00.39	+4.81	Q
20	51	Logan Hanneman	United States	3:00.92	+5.34	Q
21	36	Hiroyuki Miyazawa	Japan	3:00.99	+5.41	Q
22	23	Baptiste Gros	France	3:01.25	+5.67	Q
23	26	Kevin Bolger	United States	3:01.55	+5.97	Q
24	12	Ristomatti Hakola	Finland	3:02.07	+6.49	Q
25	37	Aliaksandr Voranau	Belarus	3:02.43	+6.85	Q
26	49	Wang Qiang	China	3:02.63	+7.05	Q
27	39	Stefan Zelger	Italy	3:02.76	+7.18	Q
28	25	Roman Schaad	Switzerland	3:02.77	+7.19	Q
29	19	Alexander Bolshunov	Russia	3:02.87	+7.29	Q
30	13	Renaud Jay	France	3:02.87	+7.29	Q
31	29	Maciej Staręga	Poland	3:03.05	+7.47	
32	72	Davide Graz	Italy	3:03.77	+8.19	
33	50	Janez Lampič	Slovenia	3:03.88	+8.30	
34	22	Miha Šimenc	Slovenia	3:04.01	+8.43	
35	32	Lauri Vuorinen	Finland	3:04.05	+8.47	
36	3	Jovian Hediger	Switzerland	3:04.07	+8.49	
37	34	Anssi Pentsinen	Finland	3:04.15	+8.57	
38	28	Michal Novák	Czech Republic	3:04.25	+8.67	
39	33	Roman Furger	Switzerland	3:04.67	+9.09	
40	47	Claudio Muller	Italy	3:04.87	+9.29	
41	30	Andrew Newell	United States	3:04.89	+9.31	
42	54	Janosch Brugger	Germany	3:04.94	+9.36	
43	38	Sebastian Eisenlauer	Germany	3:05.17	+9.59	
44	41	Karel Tammjärv	Estonia	3:05.24	+9.66	
45	27	Dominik Baldauf	Austria	3:05.64	+10.06	
46	59	Denis Volotka	Kazakhstan	3:06.15	+10.57	
47	1	Teodor Peterson	Sweden	3:06.40	+10.82	
48	53	Dominik Bury	Poland	3:06.68	+11.10	
49	55	Jason Rüesch	Switzerland	3:06.68	+11.10	
50	44	Luis Stadlober	Austria	3:07.02	+11.44	
51	42	Len Väljas	Canada	3:07.24	+11.66	
52	57	Olzhas Klimin	Kazakhstan	3:07.36	+11.78	
53	35	Marko Kilp	Estonia	3:07.65	+12.07	
54	45	Raido Ränkel	Estonia	3:08.72	+13.14	
55	62	Daulet Rakhimbayev	Kazakhstan	3:10.16	+14.58	
56	67	Zhu Mingliang	China	3:10.24	+14.66	
57	43	Luděk Šeller	Czech Republic	3:10.88	+15.30	
58	52	Tobias Habenicht	Austria	3:11.62	+16.04	
59	58	Benjamin Moser	Austria	3:11.71	+16.13	
60	64	Mark Chanloung	Thailand	3:12.52	+16.94	
61	46	Jan Pechoušek	Czech Republic	3:12.54	+16.96	
62	56	Henri Roos	Estonia	3:12.74	+17.16	
63	48	Kamil Bury	Poland	3:12.87	+17.29	
64	68	Evan Palmer-Charrette	Canada	3:13.01	+17.43	
65	75	Phillip Bellingham	Australia	3:13.50	+17.92	
66	66	Indulis Bikše	Latvia	3:13.58	+18.00	
67	60	Nikolay Chebotko	Kazakhstan	3:13.79	+18.21	
68	82	Thomas Hjalmar Westgård	Ireland	3:14.80	+19.22	
69	73	Bao Lin	China	3:14.85	+19.27	
70	76	Ádám Kónya	Hungary	3:15.21	+19.63	
71	70	Oleksiy Krasovsky	Ukraine	3:15.75	+20.17	
72	78	Raimo Vīgants	Latvia	3:17.69	+22.11	
73	94	Hamza Dursun	Turkey	3:17.90	+22.32	
74	74	Shang Jincai	China	3:18.19	+22.61	
75	69	Isak Stianson Pedersen	Iceland	3:20.08	+24.50	
76	63	Michael Biedermann	Liechtenstein	3:20.11	+24.53	
77	71	Raul Mihai Popa	Romania	3:20.12	+24.54	
78	77	Andrej Segeč	Slovakia	3:22.10	+26.52	
79	86	Seve de Campo	Australia	3:23.65	+28.07	
80	132	Yusuf Emre Fırat	Turkey	3:23.74	+28.16	
81	81	Edi Dadić	Croatia	3:24.42	+28.84	
82	83	Jaunius Drūsys	Lithuania	3:26.77	+31.19	
83	122	Ömer Ayçiçek	Turkey	3:26.84	+31.26	
84	84	Dagur Benediktsson	Iceland	3:27.04	+31.46	
85	80	Petrică Hogiu	Romania	3:27.08	+31.50	
86	90	Marko Skender	Croatia	3:27.66	+32.08	
87	96	Yan Kostruba	Ukraine	3:27.82	+32.24	
88	127	Nikolaos Tsourekas	Greece	3:29.13	+33.55	
89	93	Matheus Vasconcellos	Brazil	3:29.27	+33.69	
90	79	Mark Pollock	Australia	3:29.61	+34.03	
91	65	Stepan Terentjev	Lithuania	3:30.24	+34.66	
92	103	Titouan Serot	Belgium	3:31.24	+35.66	
93	106	Strahinja Erić	Bosnia and Herzegovina	3:32.49	+36.91	
94	97	Ragnar Gamalíel Sigurgeirsson	Iceland	3:33.11	+37.53	
95	104	Franco Dal Farra	Argentina	3:34.00	+38.42	
96	102	Stefan Anić	Bosnia and Herzegovina	3:34.64	+39.06	
97	92	Albert Jónsson	Iceland	3:34.69	+39.11	
98	88	Yonathan Jesús Fernández	Chile	3:35.89	+40.31	
99	105	Tue Rømer	Denmark	3:37.06	+41.48	
100	126	Stavre Jada	North Macedonia	3:37.82	+42.24	
101	85	Dmytro Drahun	Ukraine	3:38.12	+42.54	
102	109	Jakov Hladika	Croatia	3:38.68	+43.10	
103	115	Marko Stanojević	Bosnia and Herzegovina	3:38.72	+43.14	
104	89	Marco Dal Farra	Argentina	3:39.03	+43.45	
105	87	Matías Zuloaga	Argentina	3:39.39	+43.81	
106	113	Rejhan Šmrković	Serbia	3:39.89	+44.31	
107	117	Kristóf Lágler	Hungary	3:40.58	+45.00	
108	128	Tariel Zharkymbaev	Kyrgyzstan	3:42.96	+47.38	
109	119	Kleanthis Karamichas	Greece	3:43.26	+47.68	
109	134	Todor Malchov	Bulgaria	3:43.26	+47.68	
111	111	Miloš Čolić	Bosnia and Herzegovina	3:44.20	+48.62	
112	99	Rhaick Bomfim	Brazil	3:44.36	+48.78	
113	100	Victor Santos	Brazil	3:44.47	+48.89	
114	91	Miloš Milosavljević	Serbia	3:44.74	+49.16	
115	120	Marijus Butrimavičius	Lithuania	3:44.87	+49.29	
116	114	Juan Agurto	Chile	3:45.47	+49.89	
117	112	Sattar Seyd	Iran	3:47.48	+51.90	
118	131	Jan Rossiter	Ireland	3:47.90	+52.32	
119	133	Joachim Weel Rosbo	Denmark	3:50.84	+55.26	
120	101	Samer Tawk	Lebanon	3:54.36	+58.78	
121	124	Sabahudin Rastić	Serbia	3:56.30	+1:00.72	
122	110	Nicolae Gaiduc	Moldova	3:56.84	+1:01.26	
123	130	Jacob Weel Rosbo	Denmark	3:57.36	+1:01.78	
124	108	Gabrielius Paukštė	Lithuania	3:57.51	+1:01.93	
125	116	Yasin Shemshaki	Iran	3:57.75	+1:02.17	
126	136	Peter Jensen	Denmark	4:03.12	+1:07.54	
127	95	Yaghoob Kiashemshaki	Iran	4:04.07	+1:08.49	
128	135	Aleksandar Milenković	Serbia	4:04.19	+1:08.61	
129	142	Timo Juhani Grönlund	Bolivia	4:09.60	+1:14.02	
130	140	Aleksandar Grbović	Montenegro	4:10.62	+1:15.04	
131	141	Angelos Antoniadis	Greece	4:12.82	+1:17.24	
132	143	Spyridonas Papadopoulos	Greece	4:16.17	+1:20.59	
133	149	Andrew Theall	Colombia	4:19.74	+1:24.16	
134	147	André Gonçalves	Portugal	4:22.65	+1:27.07	
135	129	Maroun Hanna	Lebanon	4:22.90	+1:27.32	
136	145	Roni Aleksander Zein	Lebanon	4:27.75	+1:32.17	
137	123	Reza Rajabbloukat	Iran	4:38.93	+1:43.35	
138	150	Nikolai Matveev	Kyrgyzstan	4:44.31	+1:48.73	
139	146	Filipe Cabrita	Portugal	4:48.63	+1:53.05	
140	137	Juan Luis Uberuaga	Chile	4:52.04	+1:56.46	
141	148	Nikola Kostoski	North Macedonia	4:57.64	+2:02.06	
142	144	Nikola Petkovski	North Macedonia	5:00.41	+2:04.83	
143	121	Cristian Bocancea	Moldova	5:31.50	+2:35.92	
144	139	Mark Rajack	Trinidad and Tobago	5:46.27	+2:50.69	
145	138	Charbel Al Najjar	Lebanon	5:51.41	+2:55.83	
	61	Russell Kennedy	Canada	Did not start		
	98	Batmönkhiin Achbadrakh	Mongolia	Did not start		
	107	Soninbayaryn Düürenbayar	Mongolia	Did not start		
	118	Aleksandar Ognyanov	Bulgaria	Did not start		
	125	Dashdondogiin Mönkhgerel	Mongolia	Did not start		

=== Quarterfinals ===
==== Quarterfinal 1 ====
Rank	Seed	Athlete	Country	Time	Deficit	Notes
1	5	Johannes Høsflot Klæbo	Norway	3:00.28		Q
2	2	Sergey Ustiugov	Russia	3:00.51	+0.23	Q
3	3	Finn Hågen Krogh	Norway	3:01.90	+1.62	
4	23	Kevin Bolger	United States	3:04.31	+4.03	
5	28	Roman Schaad	Switzerland	3:04.57	+4.29	
6	27	Stefan Zelger	Italy	3:05.24	+4.96	

==== Quarterfinal 2 ====
Rank	Seed	Athlete	Country	Time	Deficit	Notes
1	6	Federico Pellegrino	Italy	3:00.18		Q
2	13	Sindre Bjørnestad Skar	Norway	3:01.57	+1.39	Q
3	22	Baptiste Gros	France	3:02.38	+2.20	
4	30	Renaud Jay	France	3:02.79	+2.61	
5	4	Calle Halfvarsson	Sweden	3:03.26	+3.08	
6	12	James Clugnet	Great Britain	3:05.72	+5.54	

==== Quarterfinal 3 ====
Rank	Seed	Athlete	Country	Time	Deficit	Notes
1	9	Francesco De Fabiani	Italy	3:01.06		Q
2	10	Lucas Chanavat	France	3:01.19	+0.13	Q
3	29	Alexander Bolshunov	Russia	3:01.63	+0.57	LL
4	11	Simi Hamilton	United States	3:01.89	+0.83	LL
5	1	Viktor Thorn	Sweden	3:10.11	+9.05	
6	26	Wang Qiang	China	3:10.69	+9.63	

==== Quarterfinal 4 ====
Rank	Seed	Athlete	Country	Time	Deficit	Notes
1	7	Emil Iversen	Norway	3:06.08		Q
2	15	Richard Jouve	France	3:06.29	+0.21	Q
3	8	Joni Mäki	Finland	3:06.37	+0.25	
4	19	Artem Maltsev	Russia	3:06.74	+0.66	
5	25	Aliaksandr Voranau	Belarus	3:07.91	+1.83	
6	21	Hiroyuki Miyazawa	Japan	3:12.10	+6.02	

==== Quarterfinal 5 ====
Rank	Seed	Athlete	Country	Time	Deficit	Notes
1	14	Gleb Retivykh	Russia	3:08.93		Q
2	16	Oskar Svensson	Sweden	3:08.94	+0.01	Q
3	24	Ristomatti Hakola	Finland	3:09.18	+0.25	
4	18	Alex Harvey	Canada	3:09.35	+0.42	
5	17	Andrew Young	Great Britain	3:10.04	+1.11	
6	20	Logan Hanneman	United States	3:10.35	+1.42	

=== Semifinals ===
==== Semifinal 1 ====
Rank	Seed	Athlete	Country	Time	Deficit	Notes
1	6	Federico Pellegrino	Italy	3:08.22		Q
2	5	Johannes Høsflot Klæbo	Norway	3:08.54	+0.32	Q
3	13	Sindre Bjørnestad Skar	Norway	3:08.97	+0.75	
4	9	Francesco De Fabiani	Italy	3:10.12	+1.90	
5	11	Simi Hamilton	United States	3:10.21	+1.99	
–	2	Sergey Ustiugov	Russia	DSQ		Booked

==== Semifinal 2 ====
Rank	Seed	Athlete	Country	Time	Deficit	Notes
1	7	Emil Iversen	Norway	3:03.33		Q
2	15	Richard Jouve	France	3:03.43	+0.10	Q
3	10	Lucas Chanavat	France	3:03.51	+0.18	LL
4	14	Gleb Retivykh	Russia	3:03.66	+0.33	LL
5	16	Oskar Svensson	Sweden	3:03.73	+0.40	
6	29	Alexander Bolshunov	Russia	3:05.02	+1.69	

=== Final ===
Rank	Seed	Athlete	Country	Time	Deficit	Notes
1st place, gold medalist(s)	5	Johannes Høsflot Klæbo	Norway	3:21.17		
2nd place, silver medalist(s)	6	Federico Pellegrino	Italy	3:21.40	+0.23	
3rd place, bronze medalist(s)	14	Gleb Retivykh	Russia	3:22.54	+1.37	
4	15	Richard Jouve	France	3:23.16	+1.99	
5	7	Emil Iversen	Norway	3:23.42	+2.25	
6	10	Lucas Chanavat	France	3:42.67	+21.50	
