= Cross-country skiing at the 2018 Winter Olympics – Men's sprint =

Men's sprint at the XXIII Olympic Winter Games
- Cross-country skiing
- Venue: Alpensia Cross-Country Skiing Centre
- Dates: 13 February 2018
- Competitors: 80 from 39 nations

Medalists
1st place, gold medalist(s)		Johannes Høsflot Klæbo	Norway
2nd place, silver medalist(s)		Federico Pellegrino	Italy
3rd place, bronze medalist(s)		Alexander Bolshunov	Olympic Athletes from Russia

The men's individual sprint classical cross-country skiing competition at the 2018 Winter Olympics was held on 13 February 2018 at 17:30 KST at the Alpensia Cross-Country Skiing Centre in Pyeongchang, South Korea. The sprint distance was 1.4 km.

== Qualification ==
A total of up to 310 cross-country skiers qualified across all eleven events. Athletes qualified for this event by having met the A qualification standard, which meant having 100 or less FIS Points or meeting the B standard, which meant 120 or less FIS points in the sprint classification. Countries not meeting the A standard were allowed to enter a maximum of one B standard athlete per gender. The Points list takes into average the best results of athletes per discipline during the qualification period (1 July 2016 to 21 January 2018). Countries received additional quotas by having athletes ranked in the top 30 of the FIS Olympics Points list (two per gender maximum, overall across all events). Countries also received an additional quota (one per gender maximum) if an athlete was ranked in the top 300 of the FIS Olympics Points list. After the distribution of B standard quotas, the remaining quotas were distributed using the Olympic FIS Points list, with each athlete only counting once for qualification purposes. A country could only enter a maximum of four athletes for the event.

== Results ==
Q — qualified for next round
LL — lucky loser
PF — photo finish
DSQ — disqualified

=== Qualifying ===
The qualifying was held at 18:15.

Rank	Bib	Athlete	Country	Time	Deficit	Note
1	9	Ristomatti Hakola	Finland	3:08.54	—	Q
2	19	Johannes Høsflot Klæbo	Norway	3:08.73	+0.19	Q
3	5	Alexander Bolshunov	Olympic Athletes from Russia	3:10.20	+1.66	Q
4	27	Maicol Rastelli	Italy	3:11.32	+2.78	Q
5	12	Teodor Peterson	Sweden	3:11.55	+3.01	Q
6	22	Alexander Panzhinskiy	Olympic Athletes from Russia	3:11.63	+3.09	Q
7	13	Oskar Svensson	Sweden	3:12.02	+3.48	Q
8	30	Viktor Thorn	Sweden	3:12.19	+3.65	Q
9	16	Federico Pellegrino	Italy	3:13.18	+4.64	Q
10	1	Calle Halfvarsson	Sweden	3:13.27	+4.73	Q
11	17	Pål Golberg	Norway	3:13.71	+5.17	Q
12	8	Emil Iversen	Norway	3:14.36	+5.82	Q
13	24	Alexey Poltoranin	Kazakhstan	3:14.43	+5.89	Q
14	25	Alexey Vitsenko	Olympic Athletes from Russia	3:14.56	+6.02	Q
15	32	Marko Kilp	Estonia	3:15.05	+6.51	Q
16	31	Sebastian Eisenlauer	Germany	3:15.06	+6.52	Q
17	11	Jovian Hediger	Switzerland	3:15.86	+7.32	Q
18	7	Eirik Brandsdal	Norway	3:15.95	+7.41	Q
19	2	Simi Hamilton	United States	3:16.13	+7.59	Q
20	4	Baptiste Gros	France	3:16.27	+7.73	Q
21	10	Iivo Niskanen	Finland	3:16.37	+7.83	Q
22	45	Thomas Bing	Germany	3:16.66	+8.12	Q
23	14	Lauri Vuorinen	Finland	3:16.69	+8.15	Q
24	6	Martti Jylhä	Finland	3:16.79	+8.25	Q
25	51	Peter Mlynár	Slovakia	3:16.82	+8.28	Q
26	39	Len Väljas	Canada	3:17.11	+8.57	Q
27	41	Aliaksandr Voranau	Belarus	3:17.12	+8.58	Q
28	53	Kamil Bury	Poland	3:17.15	+8.61	Q
29	3	Richard Jouve	France	3:17.69	+9.15	Q
30	34	Erik Bjornsen	United States	3:17.69	+9.15	Q
31	33	Raido Ränkel	Estonia	3:17.88	+9.34	
32	15	Alex Harvey	Canada	3:17.95	+9.41	
32	29	Miha Šimenc	Slovenia	3:17.95	+9.41	
34	20	Lucas Chanavat	France	3:18.46	+9.92	
35	23	Dominik Baldauf	Austria	3:18.54	+10.00	
35	52	Jesse Cockney	Canada	3:18.54	+10.00	
37	21	Andrew Newell	United States	3:19.36	+10.82	
38	26	Maciej Staręga	Poland	3:19.42	+10.88	
39	60	Ueli Schnider	Switzerland	3:19.47	+10.93	
40	50	Mirco Bertolina	Italy	3:20.07	+11.53	
41	38	Stefan Zelger	Italy	3:20.18	+11.64	
42	44	Logan Hanneman	United States	3:20.74	+12.20	
43	58	Aleš Razým	Czech Republic	3:21.05	+12.51	
44	47	Modestas Vaičiulis	Lithuania	3:21.10	+12.56	
45	18	Andrew Young	Great Britain	3:21.50	+12.96	
46	28	Janez Lampič	Slovenia	3:22:03	+13.49	
47	59	Alin Florin Cioancă	Romania	3:22.22	+13.68	
48	37	Andrey Melnichenko	Olympic Athletes from Russia	3:22.27	+13.73	
49	56	Kim Magnus	South Korea	3:22.36	+13.82	
50	35	Erwan Käser	Switzerland	3:22.48	+13.94	
51	43	Denis Volotka	Kazakhstan	3:22.52	+13.98	
52	49	Karel Tammjärv	Estonia	3:22.68	+14.14	
53	36	Luis Stadlober	Austria	3:23.01	+14.47	
54	46	Russell Kennedy	Canada	3:23.37	+14.83	
55	71	Isak Stianson Pedersen	Iceland	3:24.57	+16.03	
56	62	Andrej Segeč	Slovakia	3:24.84	+16.30	
57	63	Mark Chanloung	Thailand	3:26.12	+17.58	
58	55	Miroslav Rypl	Czech Republic	3:27.46	+18.92	
59	68	Veselin Tzinzov	Bulgaria	3:28.19	+19.65	
60	40	Michal Novák	Czech Republic	3:28.33	+19.79	
61	61	Miroslav Šulek	Slovakia	3:28.74	+20.20	
62	70	Thomas Hjalmar Westgård	Ireland	3:29.16	+21.07	
63	57	Indulis Bikše	Latvia	3:30.53	+21.99	
64	67	Mantas Strolia	Lithuania	3:31.11	+22.57	
65	42	Phillip Bellingham	Australia	3:31.54	+23.00	
66	54	Wang Qiang	China	3:31.56	+23.02	
67	65	Ádám Kónya	Hungary	3:31.84	+23.30	
68	75	Yordan Chuchuganov	Bulgaria	3:32.62	+24.08	
69	66	Edi Dadić	Croatia	3:33.17	+24.63	
70	48	Oleksiy Krasovsky	Ukraine	3:33.40	+24.86	
71	73	Hamza Dursun	Turkey	3:36.53	+27.99	
72	74	Mikayel Mikayelyan	Armenia	3:37.40	+28.86	
73	69	Andriy Orlyk	Ukraine	3:39.18	+30.64	
74	80	Apostolos Angelis	Greece	3:47.10	+38.56	
75	72	Damir Rastić	Serbia	3:50.65	+42.11	
76	78	Sattar Seid	Iran	3:56.08	+47.54	
77	77	Ömer Ayçiçek	Turkey	3:57.91	+49.37	
78	76	Tariel Zharkymbaev	Kyrgyzstan	4:05.99	+57.45	
79	79	Stavre Jada	Macedonia	4:23.85	+1:15.31	
	64	Sun Qinghai	China	DSQ		

=== Quarterfinals ===
Quarterfinal 1

Rank	Seed	Athlete	Country	Time	Deficit	Note
1	2	Johannes Høsflot Klæbo	Norway	3:11.09	—	Q
2	5	Teodor Peterson	Sweden	3:12.23	+1.14	Q
3	29	Richard Jouve	France	3:12.40	+1.31	
4	13	Alexey Poltoranin	Kazakhstan	3:12.60	+1.51	
5	30	Erik Bjornsen	United States	3:12.72	+1.63	
6	4	Maicol Rastelli	Italy	3:14.38	+3.29	

Quarterfinal 2

Rank	Seed	Athlete	Country	Time	Deficit	Note
1	9	Federico Pellegrino	Italy	3:10.55	—	Q
2	11	Pål Golberg	Norway	3:11.07	+0.52	Q
3	10	Calle Halfvarsson	Sweden	3:11.95	+1.40	PF
4	15	Marko Kilp	Estonia	3:12.00	+1.45	PF
5	18	Eirik Brandsdal	Norway	3:18.25	+7.70	
6	28	Kamil Bury	Poland	3:25.79	+15.24	

Quarterfinal 3

Rank	Seed	Athlete	Country	Time	Deficit	Note
1	3	Alexander Bolshunov	Olympic Athletes from Russia	3:08.45	—	Q
2	1	Ristomatti Hakola	Finland	3:09.41	+0.96	Q
3	21	Iivo Niskanen	Finland	3:12.20	+3.75	
4	17	Jovian Hediger	Switzerland	3:14.25	+5.80	
5	27	Aliaksandr Voranau	Belarus	3:14.95	+6.50	
6	8	Viktor Thorn	Sweden	3:17.33	+8.88	

Quarterfinal 4

Rank	Seed	Athlete	Country	Time	Deficit	Note
1	7	Oskar Svensson	Sweden	3:08.77	—	Q
2	12	Emil Iversen	Norway	3:10.21	+1.44	Q
3	26	Len Väljas	Canada	3:10.87	+2.10	LL
4	6	Alexander Panzhinskiy	Olympic Athletes from Russia	3:11.15	+2.38	LL
5	25	Peter Mlynár	Slovakia	3:15.77	+7.00	
6	16	Sebastian Eisenlauer	Germany	3:16.22	+7.45	

Quarterfinal 5

Rank	Seed	Athlete	Country	Time	Deficit	Note
1	24	Martti Jylhä	Finland	3:17.46	—	Q
2	20	Baptiste Gros	France	3:18.62	+1.16	Q, PF
3	22	Thomas Bing	Germany	3:18.64	+1.18	PF
4	19	Simi Hamilton	United States	3:27.89	+10.43	
5	14	Alexey Vitsenko	Olympic Athletes from Russia	3:30.72	+13.26	
6	23	Lauri Vuorinen	Finland	3:33.13	+15.67	

=== Semifinals ===
Semifinal 1

Rank	Seed	Athlete	Country	Time	Deficit	Note
1	2	Johannes Høsflot Klæbo	Norway	3:06.01	—	Q
2	9	Federico Pellegrino	Italy	3:06.17	+0.16	Q
3	3	Alexander Bolshunov	Olympic Athletes from Russia	3:06.63	+0.62	LL
4	11	Pål Golberg	Norway	3:07.24	+1.23	LL
5	5	Teodor Peterson	Sweden	3:11.02	+5.01	
6	6	Alexander Panzhinskiy	Olympic Athletes from Russia	3:19.05	+13.04	

Semifinal 2

Rank	Seed	Athlete	Country	Time	Deficit	Note
1	1	Ristomatti Hakola	Finland	3:09.93	—	Q
2	7	Oskar Svensson	Sweden	3:10.61	+0.68	Q
3	26	Len Väljas	Canada	3:13.91	+3.98	
4	12	Emil Iversen	Norway	3:14.09	+4.16	
5	24	Martti Jylhä	Finland	3:14.93	+5.00	
6	20	Baptiste Gros	France	3:27.44	+17.51	

=== Final ===
The final was held at 21:37.

Rank	Seed	Athlete	Country	Time	Deficit	Note
1st place, gold medalist(s)	2	Johannes Høsflot Klæbo	Norway	3:05.75	—	
2nd place, silver medalist(s)	9	Federico Pellegrino	Italy	3:07.09	+1.34	PF
3rd place, bronze medalist(s)	3	Alexander Bolshunov	Olympic Athletes from Russia	3:07.11	+1.36	PF
4	11	Pål Golberg	Norway	3:09.56	+3.81	
5	7	Oskar Svensson	Sweden	3:13.48	+7.73	
6	1	Ristomatti Hakola	Finland	3:26.47	+20.72	
