= Lucas Bögl =

German cross-country skier (born 1990)

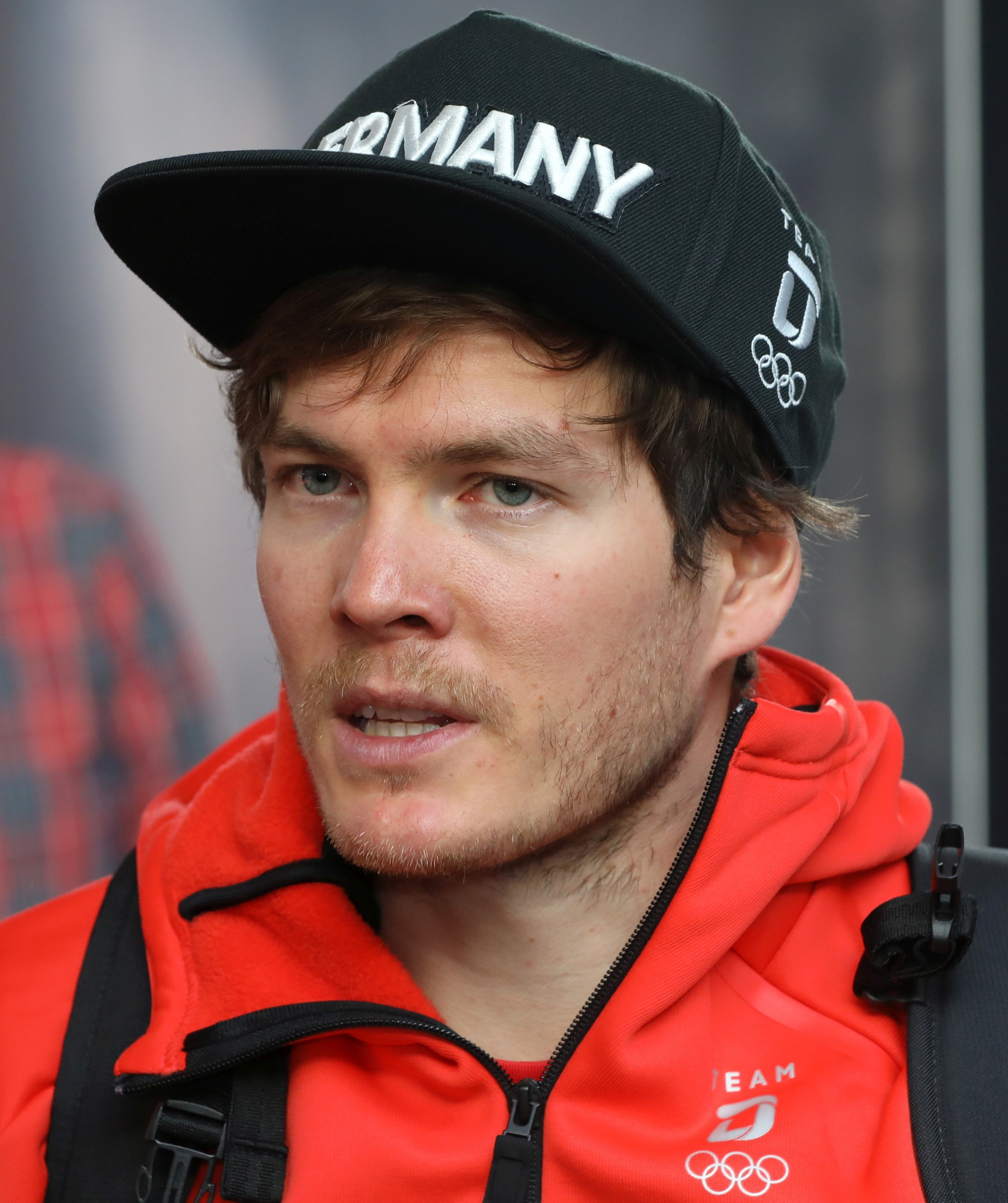
- Lucas Bögl in 2018

Personal information
- Nationality: Germany
- Born: 14 June 1990 (age 36) Munich, West Germany
- Height: 1.72 m (5 ft 8 in)

Sport
- Sport: Skiing
- Club: SC Gaissach

World Cup career
- Seasons: 12 – (2011, 2013–present)
- Indiv. starts: 125
- Indiv. podiums: 0
- Team starts: 7
- Team podiums: 0
- Overall titles: 0 – (26th in 2021)
- Discipline titles: 0
Medal record
Representing Germany
Men's cross-country skiing
Junior World Championships
Bronze medal – third place	2010 Hinterzarten	4 × 5 km relay
- Updated on 29 March 2023

Lucas Bögl (born 14 June 1990) is a German cross-country skier who competes internationally.

He competed for Germany at the FIS Nordic World Ski Championships 2017 in Lahti, Finland.

== Cross-country skiing results ==
All results are sourced from the International Ski Federation (FIS).

=== Olympic Games ===
Year	Age	15 km individual	30 km skiathlon	50 km mass start	Sprint	4 × 10 km relay	Team sprint
2018	27	15	16	46	—	—	—
2022	31	17	12	33^{[a]}	—	5	—

^{a} Distance reduced to 30 km due to weather conditions.

=== World Championships ===
Year	Age	15 km individual	30 km skiathlon	50 km mass start	Sprint	4 × 10 km relay	Team sprint
2017	26	31	19	18	—	6	—
2019	28	26	34	31	—	—	—
2021	30	28	29	33	—	7	—
2023	32	25	33	—	—	—	—

=== World Cup ===
==== Season standings ====
Season	Age	Discipline standings			Ski Tour standings				
Season	Age	Overall	Distance	Sprint	Nordic Opening	Tour de Ski	Ski Tour 2020	World Cup Final	Ski Tour Canada
2011	20	NC	NC	NC	—	DNF	—N/a	—	—N/a
2013	22	NC	NC	—	—	DNF	—N/a	—	—N/a
2014	23	NC	NC	—	—	—	—N/a	—	—N/a
2015	24	103	61	NC	—	31	—N/a	—N/a	—N/a
2016	25	115	68	NC	—	39	—N/a	—N/a	—
2017	26	58	50	NC	—	19	—N/a	36	—N/a
2018	27	52	34	NC	—	25	—N/a	48	—N/a
2019	28	56	42	NC	30	22	—N/a	—	—N/a
2020	29	35	26	NC	27	16	—	—N/a	—N/a
2021	30	26	24	NC	25	12	—N/a	—N/a	—N/a
2022	31	34	26	NC	—N/a	20	—N/a	—N/a	—N/a
2023	32	66	34	NC	—N/a	DNF	—N/a	—N/a	—N/a
