= Lauri Vuorinen =

Finnish cross-country skier (born 1995)

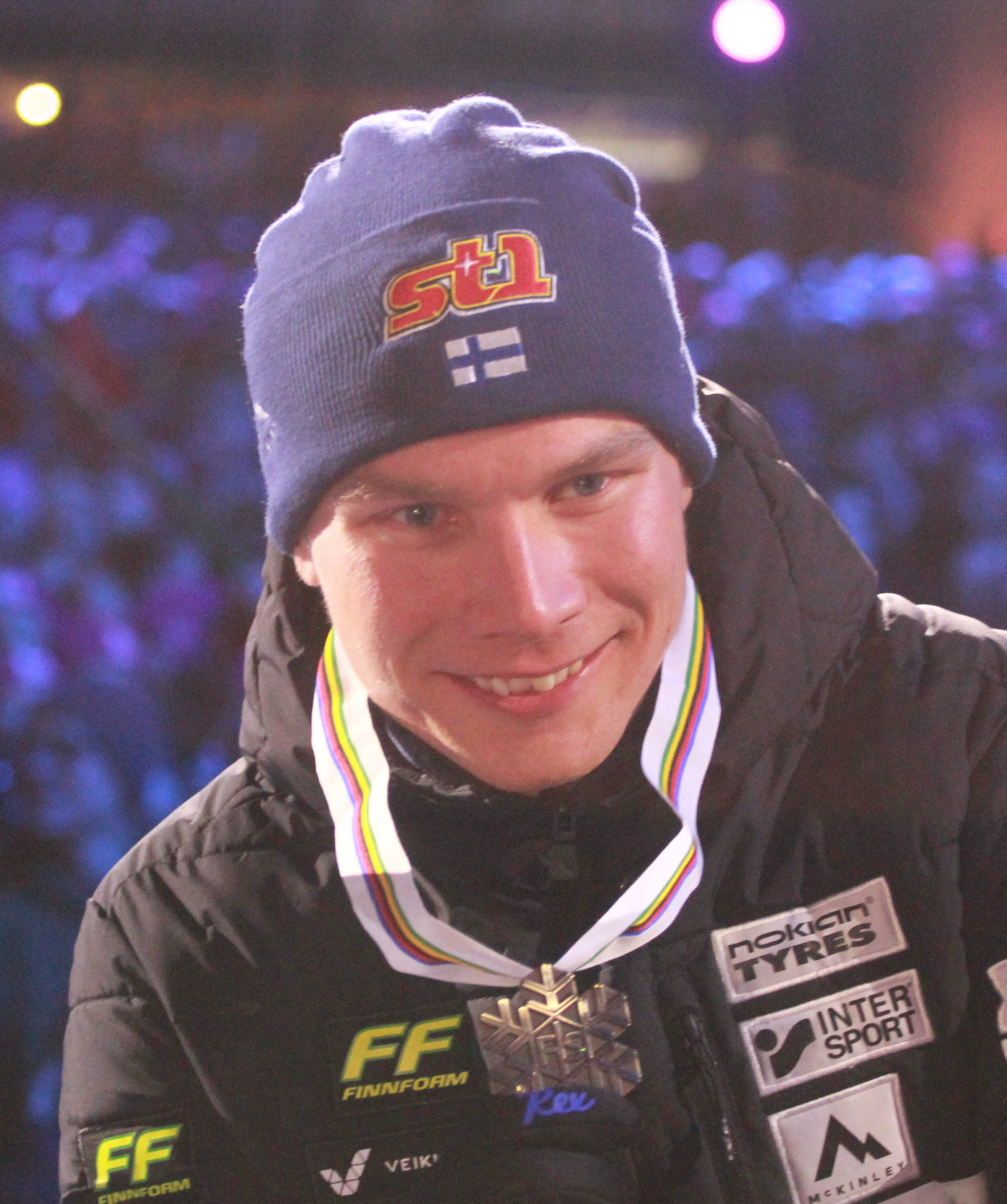
- Vuorinen in 2025

Personal information
- Nationality: Finland
- Born: 1 January 1995 (age 31) Perniö, Finland

Sport
- Sport: Skiing
- Club: Ounasvaaran Hiihtoseura

World Cup career
- Seasons: 13 – (2013–present)
- Indiv. starts: 115
- Indiv. podiums: 2
- Team starts: 14
- Team podiums: 1
- Overall titles: 0 – (20th in 2024)
- Discipline titles: 0
Medal record
World Championships
Silver medal – second place	2025 Trondheim	Team sprint
Bronze medal – third place	2025 Trondheim	Individual sprint
- Updated on 1 December 2024

Lauri Vuorinen (born 1 January 1995) is a Finnish cross-country skier who specializes in sprint events. He has competed in the 2018 and 2022 Winter Olympics as well as in multiple FIS World Championships.

Season 2023–2024 was one of Lauri's most successful seasons to date, including his first podium in Lahti in Men's team sprint (classic) on March 1, 2024, and his first individual podium in Falun in classic sprint on March 15, 2024.

== Cross-country skiing results ==
All results are sourced from the International Ski Federation (FIS).

=== Olympic Games ===
Year	Age	10/15 km individual	20/30 km skiathlon	50 km mass start	Sprint	4 × 7.5/10 km relay	Team sprint
2018	23	—	—	—	29	—	—
2022	27	—	—	—^{[a]}	14	—	—
2026	31	—	—	27	4	4	11

^{a} Distance reduced to 30 km due to weather conditions.

=== World Championships ===
- 2 medals – (1 silver, 1 bronze)

Year	Age	10/15 km individual	20/30 km skiathlon	50 km mass start	Sprint	4 × 7.5/10 km relay	Team sprint
2019	24	—	—	—	34	—	—
2021	26	—	—	—	15	—	—
2023	28	—	—	—	32	—	—
2025	30				Bronze		Silver

=== World Cup ===
==== Season standings ====
Season	Age	Discipline standings				Ski Tour standings				
Season	Age	Overall	Distance	Sprint	U23	Nordic Opening	Tour de Ski	Ski Tour 2020	World Cup Final	Ski Tour Canada
2013	18	NC	—	NC	—N/a	—	—	—N/a	—	—N/a
2014	19	NC	—	NC	—N/a	—	—	—N/a	—	—N/a
2015	20	NC	—	NC	NC	—	—	—N/a	—N/a	—N/a
2016	21	148	NC	99	19	79	—	—N/a	—N/a	—
2017	22	116	119	59	12	—	—	—N/a	—	—N/a
2018	23	68	NC	30	9	DNF	—	—N/a	—	—N/a
2019	24	72	NC	34	—N/a	65	DNF	—N/a	46	—N/a
2020	25	58	NC	22	—N/a	57	—	49	—N/a	—N/a
2021	26	72	NC	30	—N/a	52	—	—N/a	—N/a	—N/a
2022	27	32	78	11	—N/a	—N/a	DNF	—N/a	—N/a	—N/a
2023	28	54	111	25	—N/a	—N/a	—	—N/a	—N/a	—N/a
2024	29	20	36	9	—N/a	—N/a	DNF	—N/a	—N/a	—N/a
2025	30	22	62	7	—N/a	—N/a	DNF	—N/a	—N/a	—N/a

==== Individual podiums ====
- 2 podiums – (2 WC, 0 SWC)

No.	Season	Date	Location	Race	Level	Place
1	2023–24	15 March 2024	Falun, Sweden	1.4 km Sprint C	World Cup	2nd
2	2024–25	30 November 2024	Rukatunturi, Finland	1.4 km Sprint C	World Cup	3rd

==== Team podiums ====
- 1 podium – (1 TS)

No.	Season	Date	Location	Race	Level	Place	Teammate(s)
1	2023–24	1 March 2024	Lahti, Finland	6 × 1.3 km Team Sprint C	World Cup	3rd	Niskanen
