= Viktor Thorn (cross-country skier) =

Swedish cross-country skier

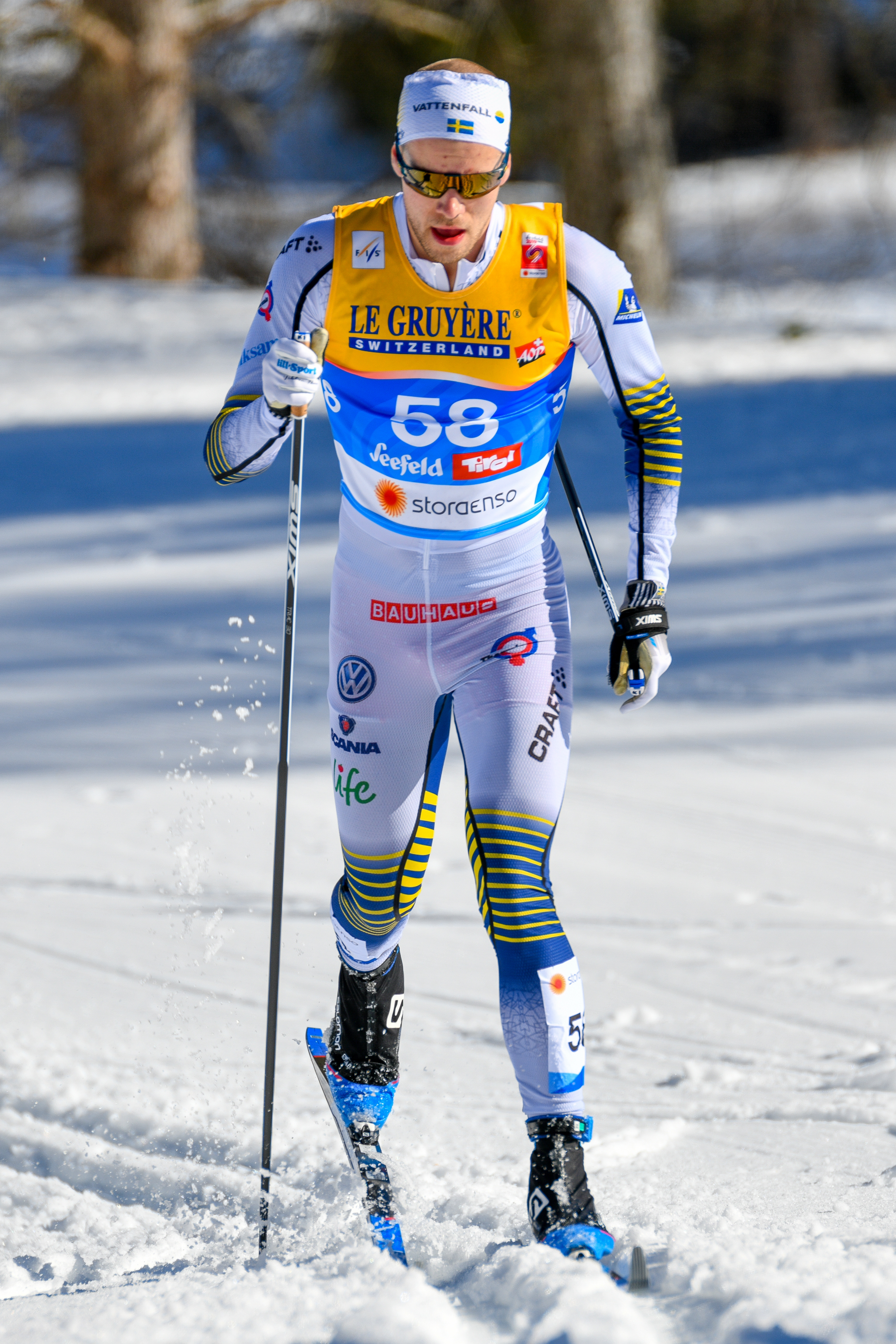
- Viktor Thorn during the 2019 World Championships in Seefeld, Austria

Personal information
- Full name: John Viktor Örjan Thorn
- Nationality: Sweden
- Born: 11 May 1996 (age 30) Bengtsfors, Sweden

Sport
- Sport: Skiing
- Club: Ulricehamns IF SK

World Cup career
- Seasons: 5 – (2017–2021)
- Indiv. starts: 57
- Indiv. podiums: 0
- Team starts: 3
- Team podiums: 0
- Overall titles: 0 – (18th in 2019)
- Discipline titles: 0
- Updated on 9 April 2021

Viktor Thorn (born 11 May 1996) is a Swedish cross-country skier. He competed in the 2018 Winter Olympics. On 6 April 2021, he announced his retirement from cross-country skiing.

== Cross-country skiing results ==
All results are sourced from the International Ski Federation (FIS).

=== Olympic Games ===
Year	Age	15 km individual	30 km skiathlon	50 km mass start	Sprint	4 × 10 km relay	Team sprint
2018	21	—	—	40	27	—	—

=== World Championships ===
Year	Age	15 km individual	30 km skiathlon	50 km mass start	Sprint	4 × 10 km relay	Team sprint
2019	22	12	—	—	20	5	—

=== World Cup ===
==== Season standings ====
Season	Age	Discipline standings				Ski Tour standings			
Season	Age	Overall	Distance	Sprint	U23	Nordic Opening	Tour de Ski	Ski Tour 2020	World Cup Final
2017	20	97	67	84	7	—	34	—N/a	37
2018	21	71	39	67	11	—	—	—N/a	42
2019	22	18	26	18	4	9	18	—N/a	15
2020	23	86	89	58	—N/a	—	—	DNF	—N/a
2021	24	119	—	72	—N/a	—	—	—N/a	—N/a
