= Janez Lampič =

Yugoslav cyclist

Personal information
- Born: 18 October 1963 (age 62) Kranj, Slovenia, Yugoslavia

Cycling career
- Sport: Cycling

Janez Lampič (born 18 October 1963) is a Yugoslav Slovene former cyclist. He competed in the team time trial event at the 1984 Summer Olympics.

== Biography ==
His younger son, Janez Lampič is a Slovenian cross-country skier. His elder daughter, Anamarija Lampič is also a cross-country skier who has competed at the World Championships held in 2015 and 2017 before earning an opportunity to compete for Slovenia at the 2018 Winter Olympics. Coincidentally, both of his children, Janez Lampič and Anamarija Lampič made their Olympic debuts during the 2018 Winter Olympics and competed in the cross-country skiing events.
