= Janez Lampič (skier) =

Slovenian cross-country skier

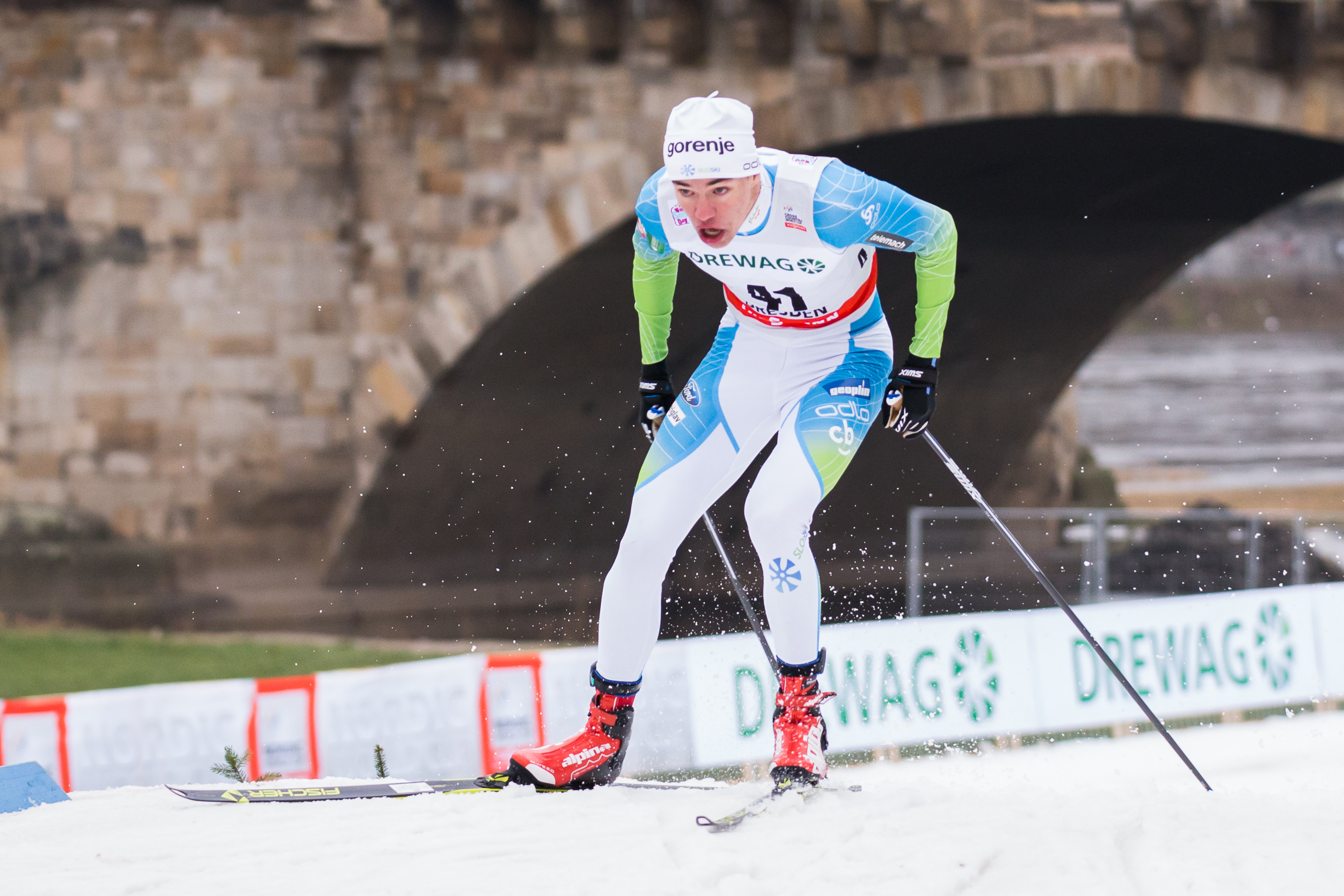
- Lampič in 2018

Personal information
- Nationality: Slovenia
- Born: September 27, 1996 (age 30) Ljubljana, Slovenia

Sport
- Sport: Skiing
- Club: TSK Triglav Kranj

World Cup career
- Seasons: 7 – (2016–2022)
- Indiv. starts: 54
- Indiv. podiums: 0
- Team starts: 8
- Team podiums: 0
- Overall titles: 0 – (101st in 2021)
- Discipline titles: 0
- Updated on 7 March 2023

Janez Lampič (born 27 September 1996) also often known as Janez Lampic (to avoid confusion with his father's name) is a Slovenian male cross-country skier. He went onto participate at the 2018 Winter Olympics representing Slovenia and competed in the men's sprint event finished on 46th position.

== Biography ==
Janez Lampic was born on 27 September 1996 just after his elder sister's birth in 1995. His father, Janez Lampič was a professional road cyclist who represented Yugoslavia at the 1984 Summer Olympics and competed in the men's team time trial event. His elder sister, Anamarija Lampič is also a cross-country skier who has competed at the World Championships held in 2015 and 2017 before earning an opportunity to compete for Slovenia at the 2018 Winter Olympics. Coincidentally, both Janez Lampič and Anamarija Lampič made their Olympic debuts during the 2018 Winter Olympics and competed in the cross-country skiing events.

== Cross-country skiing results ==
All results are sourced from the International Ski Federation (FIS).

=== Olympic Games ===
Year	Age	15 km individual	30 km skiathlon	50 km mass start	Sprint	4 × 10 km relay	Team sprint
2018	21	—	—	—	47	—	21
2022	25	—	—	—	74	14	—

=== World Championships ===
Year	Age	15 km individual	30 km skiathlon	50 km mass start	Sprint	4 × 10 km relay	Team sprint
2017	20	—	—	—	37	—	13
2019	22	—	—	—	32	—	9
2021	24	—	—	—	55	—	19

=== World Cup ===
==== Season standings ====
Season	Age	Discipline standings				Ski Tour standings				
Season	Age	Overall	Distance	Sprint	U23	Nordic Opening	Tour de Ski	Ski Tour 2020	World Cup Final	Ski Tour Canada
2016	19	NC	—	NC	NC	—	—	—N/a	—N/a	—
2017	20	105	NC	52	9	DNF	—	—N/a	—	—N/a
2018	21	124	NC	68	15	DNF	—	—N/a	—	—N/a
2019	22	141	NC	93	17	DNF	—	—N/a	DNF	—N/a
2020	23	124	NC	74	—N/a	DNF	—	DNF	—N/a	—N/a
2021	24	101	NC	61	—N/a	DNF	DNF	—N/a	—N/a	—N/a
2022	25	NC	—	NC	—N/a	—N/a	—	—N/a	—N/a	—N/a
