= Stefan Zelger =

Italian cross-country skier

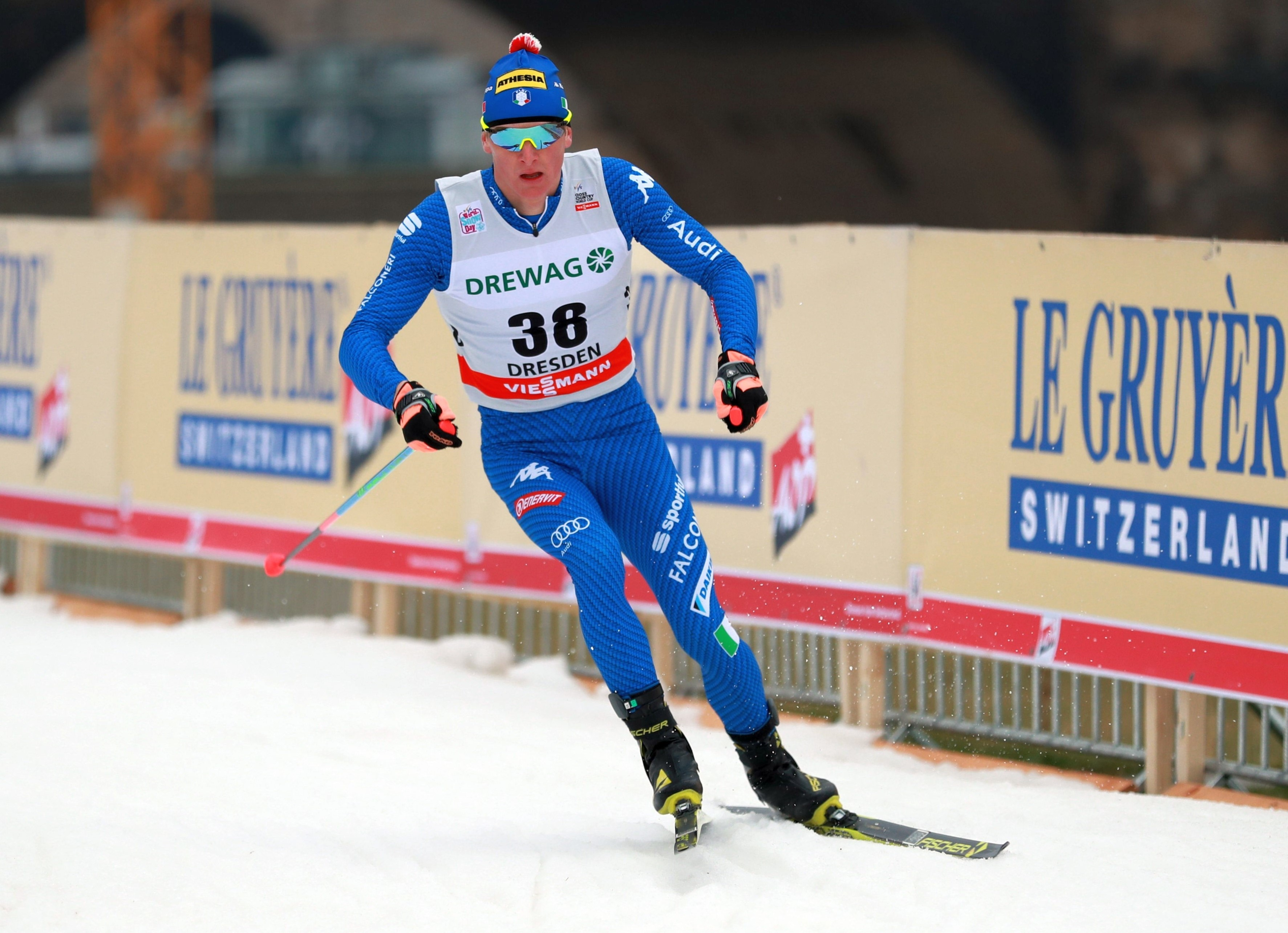
- Zelger in January, 2018

Personal information
- Nationality: Italy
- Born: 9 September 1995 (age 30) Bozen, Italy

Sport
- Sport: Skiing
- Club: C.S. Esercito

World Cup career
- Seasons: 5 – (2017–2021)
- Indiv. starts: 34
- Indiv. podiums: 0
- Team starts: 7
- Team podiums: 0
- Overall titles: 0 – (89th in 2020)
- Discipline titles: 0
- Updated on 14 November 2021

Stefan Zelger (born 9 September 1995) is an Italian cross-country skier. He competed in the 2018 Winter Olympics.

== Cross-country skiing results ==
All results are sourced from the International Ski Federation (FIS).

=== Olympic Games ===
Year	Age	15 km individual	30 km skiathlon	50 km mass start	Sprint	4 × 10 km relay	Team sprint
2018	22	60	—	—	42	—	—

=== World Championships ===
Year	Age	15 km individual	30 km skiathlon	50 km mass start	Sprint	4 × 10 km relay	Team sprint
2019	23	57	—	—	29	—	—

=== World Cup ===
==== Season standings ====
Season	Age	Discipline standings				Ski Tour standings			
Season	Age	Overall	Distance	Sprint	U23	Nordic Opening	Tour de Ski	Ski Tour 2020	World Cup Final
2017	21	NC	—	NC	NC	—	—	—N/a	—
2018	22	147	NC	85	28	—	—	—N/a	—
2019	23	118	90	85	—N/a	—	DNF	—N/a	—
2020	24	89	NC	53	—N/a	59	DNF	—	—N/a
2021	25	NC	—	NC	—N/a	—	—	—N/a	—N/a
