= Jan Thomas Jenssen =

Norwegian cross-country skier

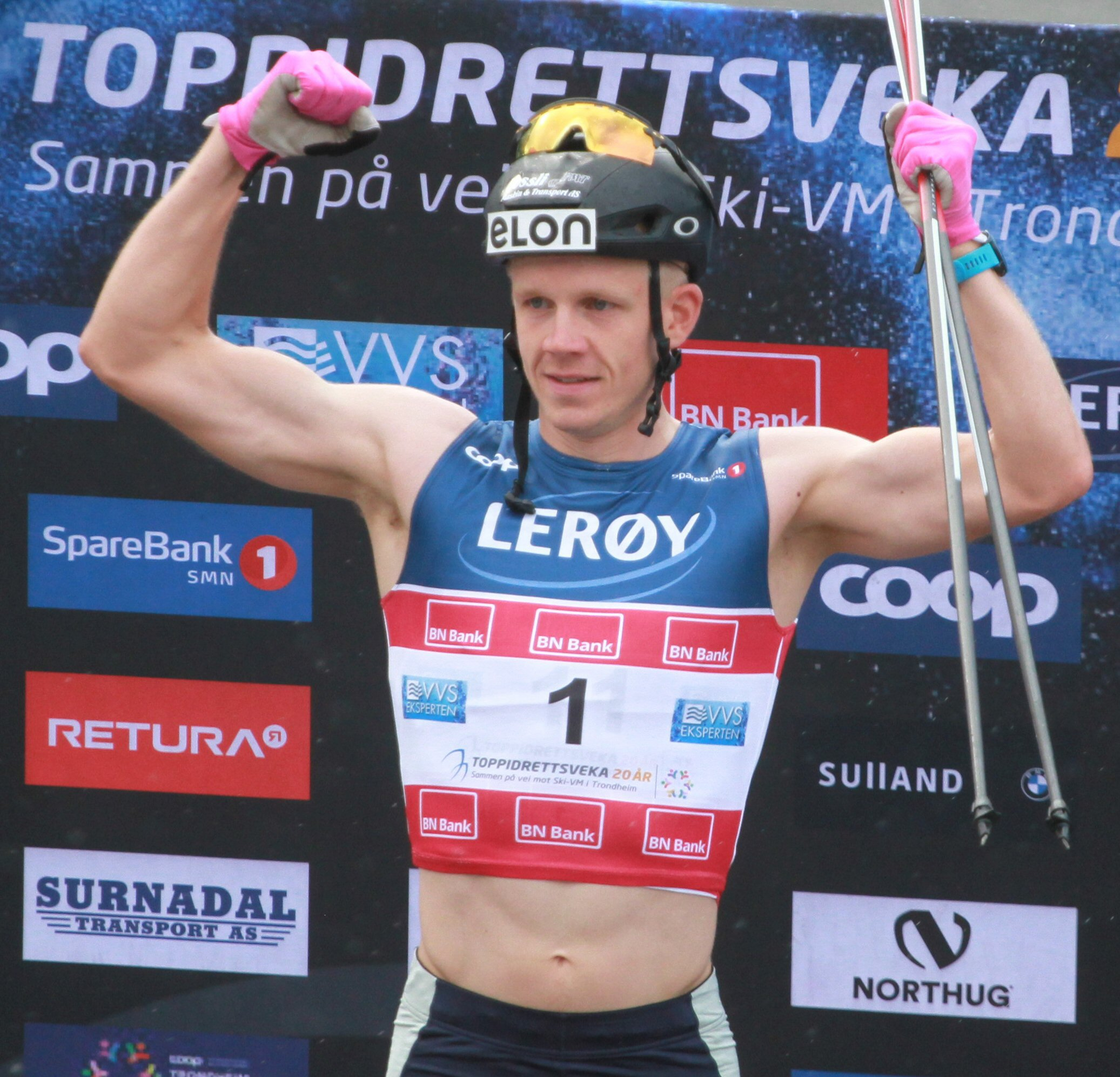

Personal information
- Nationality: Norway
- Born: 1 April 1996 (age 30) Trondheim, Norway

Sport
- Sport: Skiing
- Club: Hommelvik IL

World Cup career
- Seasons: 5 – (2017–present)
- Indiv. starts: 37
- Indiv. podiums: 5
- Indiv. wins: 1
- Team podiums: 1
- Team wins: 1
- Overall titles: 0 – (23rd in 2025)
- Discipline titles: 0
Medal record
Men's cross-country skiing
Representing Norway
U23 World Championships
Bronze medal – third place	2018 Goms	Individual sprint
Junior World Championships
Gold medal – first place	2016 Râșnov	4 × 5 km relay
- Updated on 16 March 2025

Jan Thomas Jenssen (born 1 April 1996) is a Norwegian cross-country skier.

He made his World Cup debut in December 2017 in Lillehammer, finishing 51st. Two years later, he recorded his first placement among the top 30, finishing 8th in the Lenzerheide mass start of the 2019–20 Tour de Ski. He obtained his first World Cup win in November 2023 after missing three years of World Cup racing, winning the 20 kilometer freestyle mass start in Ruka, Finland. He also was on the winning team in the 4x7.5 km team relay in Gällivare, Sweden a week later.

== Cross-country skiing results ==
All results are sourced from the International Ski Federation (FIS).

=== World Cup ===
==== Season standings ====
Season	Age	Discipline standings				Ski Tour standings
Season	Age	Overall	Distance	Sprint	U23	Tour de Ski
2020	23	37	31	41	—N/a	18
2024	27	30	20	115	—N/a	15
2025	28	23	20	NC	—N/a	10

==== Individual podiums ====
- 1 victory – (1 WC)
- 5 podiums – (3 WC, 2 SWC)

No.	Season	Date	Location	Race	Level	Place
1	2023–24	27 November 2023	Rukatunturi, Finland	20 km Mass Start F	World Cup	1st
2	2023–24	1 January 2024	Toblach, Italy	20 km Pursuit F	Stage World Cup	3rd
3	2024–25	1 December 2024	Rukatunturi, Finland	20 km Mass Start F	World Cup	2nd
4	2024–25	8 December 2024	Lillehammer, Norway	10 km + 10 km Skiathlon C/F	World Cup	2nd
5	2024–25	4 January 2025	Val di Fiemme, Italy	10 km + 10 km Skiathlon C/F	Stage World Cup	3rd

==== Team podiums ====
- 1 victory – (1 RL)
- 1 podium – (1 RL)

No.	Season	Date	Location	Race	Level	Place	Teammate
1	2023–24	3 December 2023	Gällivare, Sweden	4 × 7.5 km Relay C/F	World Cup	1st	Golberg / Nyenget / Krüger
