= David Norris (cricketer) =

English cricketer

Personal information
- Full name: David William Worsley Norris
- Born: 1 May 1946 (age 80); Hampstead, Middlesex, England
- Batting: Right-handed
- Role: Wicket-keeper

Domestic team information
- Years: Team
- 1967–1968: Cambridge University

Career statistics
Competition	First-class
Matches	20
Runs scored	307
Batting average	9.90
100s/50s	0/0
Top score	43
Balls bowled	–
Wickets	–
Bowling average	–
5 wickets in innings	–
10 wickets in match	–
Best bowling	–
Catches/stumpings	21/3
- Source: Cricinfo, 25 May 2020

David William Worsley Norris (born 1 May 1946) is a former English first-class cricketer who played for Cambridge University in 1967 and 1968.

David Norris attended Harrow School, where he captained the First XI, before going up to Selwyn College, Cambridge. He was Cambridge's regular wicket-keeper for the 1967 and 1968 seasons, gaining his blue in each year.

Norris has worked as a chartered accountant and company director.
