= Logan Hanneman =

American cross-country skier (born 1993)

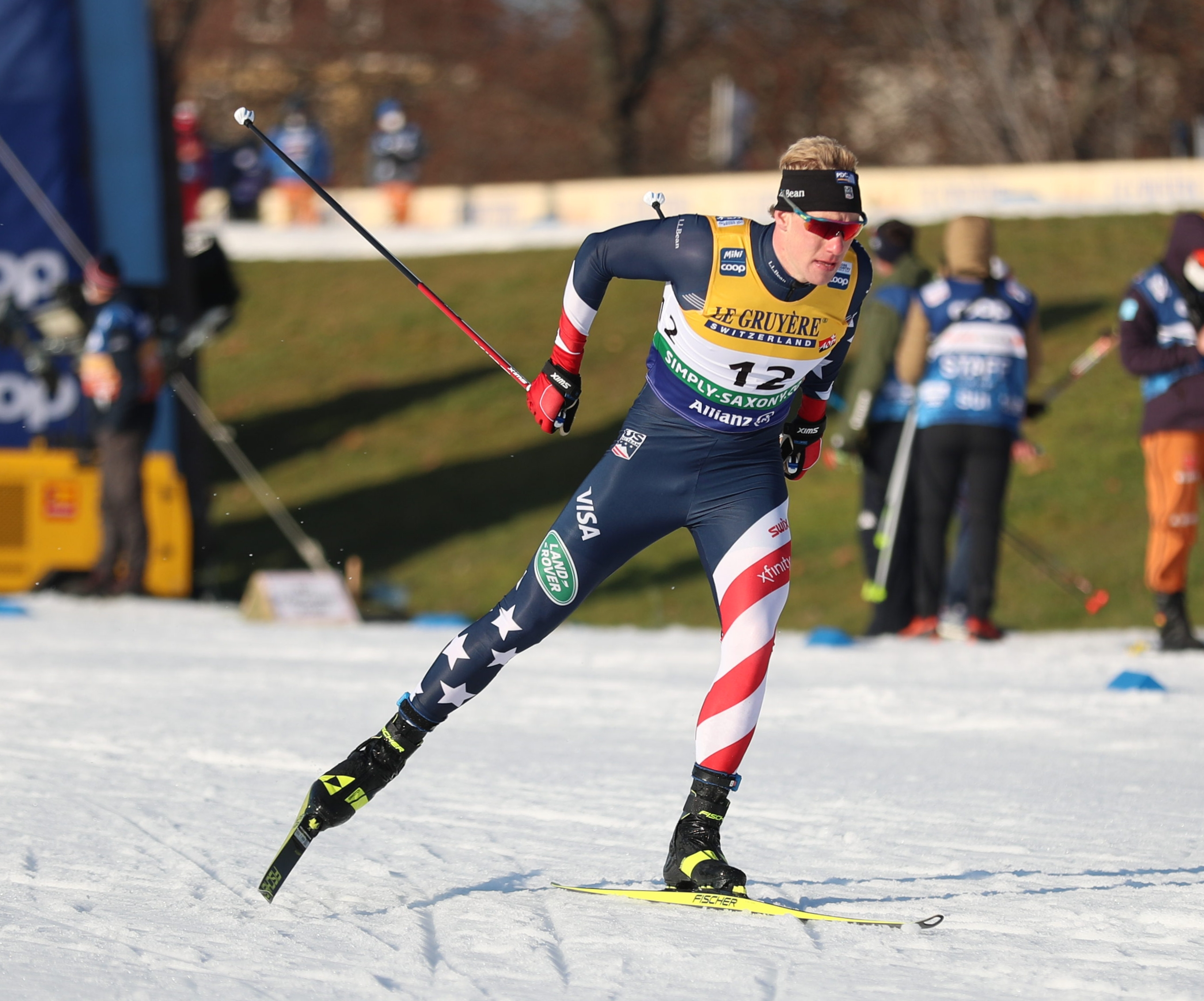
- Hanneman in 2020

Personal information
- Nationality: United States
- Born: June 2, 1993 (age 33) Fairbanks, Alaska, United States

Sport
- Sport: Skiing
- Club: APU Nordic Ski Center

World Cup career
- Seasons: 5 – (2018–present)
- Indiv. starts: 46
- Indiv. podiums: 0
- Team starts: 5
- Team podiums: 0
- Overall titles: 0 – (71st in 2021)
- Discipline titles: 0
- Updated on 16 March 2022

Logan Hanneman (born June 2, 1993) is an American cross-country skier. He competed in the 2018 Winter Olympics.

== Cross-country skiing results ==
All results are sourced from the International Ski Federation (FIS).

=== Olympic Games ===
Year	Age	15 km individual	30 km skiathlon	50 km mass start	Sprint	4 × 10 km relay	Team sprint
2018	24	—	—	—	43	—	—

=== World Championships ===
Year	Age	15 km individual	30 km skiathlon	50 km mass start	Sprint	4 × 10 km relay	Team sprint
2019	25	—	—	—	26	—	—
2021	27	—	—	—	39	—	—

=== World Cup ===
==== Season standings ====
Season	Age	Discipline standings			Ski Tour standings			
Season	Age	Overall	Distance	Sprint	Nordic Opening	Tour de Ski	Ski Tour 2020	World Cup Final
2018	24	NC	—	NC	—	—	—N/a	—
2019	25	124	NC	72	—	—	—N/a	65
2020	26	83	NC	49	—	56	DNF	—N/a
2021	27	71	NC	29	66	—	—N/a	—N/a
2022	28	130	NC	77	—N/a	DNF	—N/a	—N/a
