= Irina Bykova =

Kazakhstani cross-country skier (born 1993)

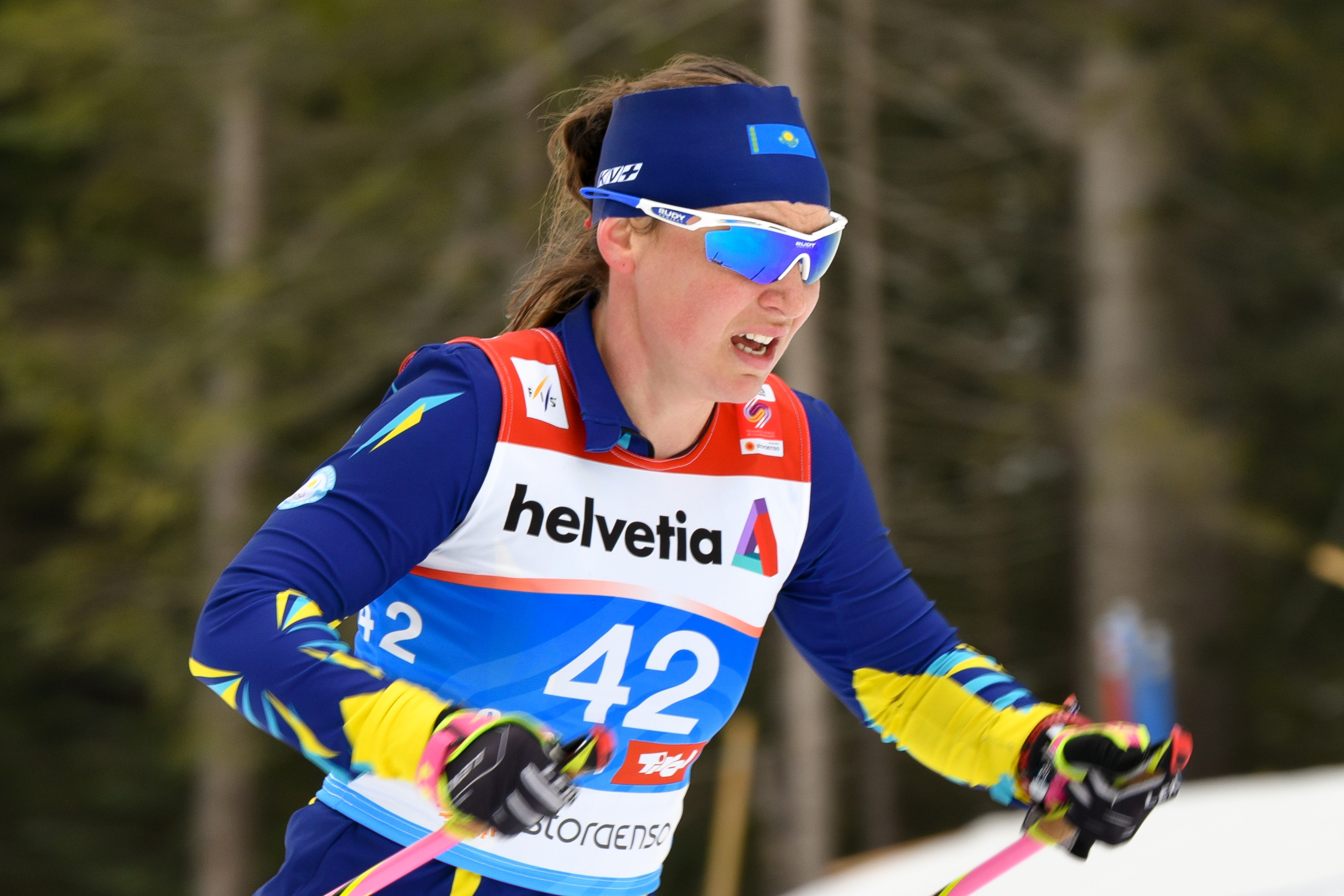
- Irina Bykova in March, 2019

Personal information
- Full name: Irina Nikolayevna Bykova
- Nationality: Kazakhstan
- Born: 6 July 1993 (age 33) Pavlodar, Kazakhstan

Sport
- Sport: Skiing

World Cup career
- Seasons: 6 – (2016–2020, 2022–present)
- Indiv. starts: 56
- Indiv. podiums: 0
- Team starts: 7
- Team podiums: 0
- Overall titles: 0 – (102nd in 2020)
- Discipline titles: 0
- Updated on 20 March 2022

Irina Nikolayevna Bykova (Russian: Ирина Николаевна Быкова; born 6 July 1993) is a Kazakhstani cross-country skier who competes internationally.

She competed for Kazakhstan at the FIS Nordic World Ski Championships 2017 in Lahti, Finland. She competed at the 2022 Winter Olympics, in Women's 30 kilometre freestyle, Women's sprint, and Women's 4 × 5 kilometre relay.

== Cross-country skiing results ==
All results are sourced from the International Ski Federation (FIS).

=== Olympic Games ===
Year	Age	10 km individual	15 km skiathlon	30 km mass start	Sprint	4 × 5 km relay	Team sprint
2022	28	—	—	54	68	15	—

=== World Championships ===
Year	Age	10 km individual	15 km skiathlon	30 km mass start	Sprint	4 × 5 km relay	Team sprint
2017	23	54	46	—	55	12	—
2019	25	41	46	44	64	15	—

=== World Cup ===
==== Season standings ====
Season	Age	Discipline standings				Ski Tour standings				
Season	Age	Overall	Distance	Sprint	U23	Nordic Opening	Tour de Ski	Ski Tour 2020	World Cup Final	Ski Tour Canada
2016	21	NC	NC	NC	NC	72	—	—N/a	—N/a	—
2017	22	NC	NC	NC	—N/a	63	—	—N/a	—	—N/a
2018	23	NC	NC	NC	—N/a	67	—	—N/a	—	—N/a
2019	24	NC	NC	NC	—N/a	53	—	—N/a	—	—N/a
2020	25	102	NC	NC	—N/a	62	40	49	—N/a	—N/a
2022	27	115	89	NC	—N/a	—N/a	—	—N/a	—N/a	—N/a
