= Miha Šimenc =

Slovenian cross-country skier (born 1995)

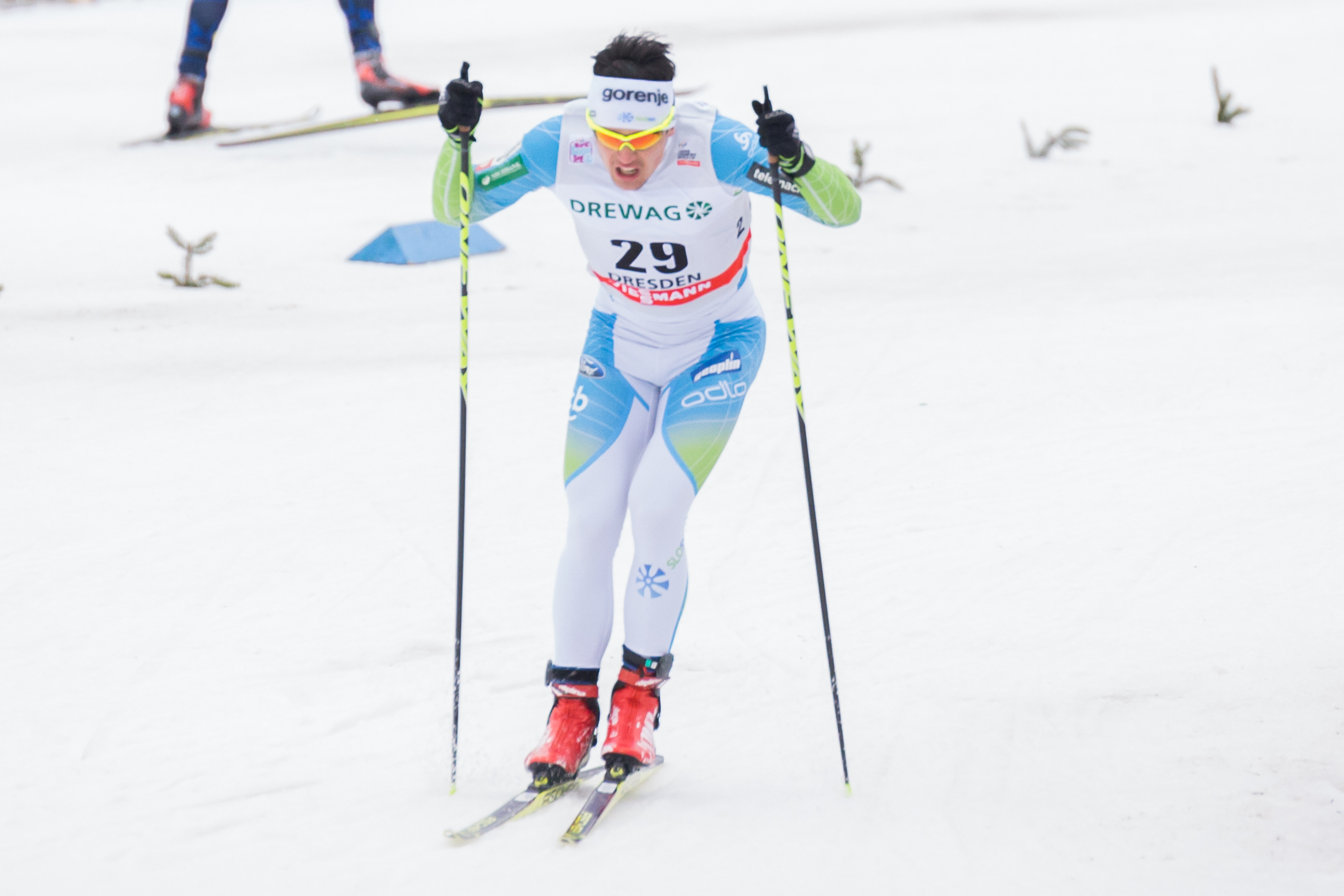
- Šimenc in 2018

Personal information
- Nationality: Slovenia
- Born: 21 December 1995 (age 30) Ljubljana, Slovenia

Sport
- Sport: Skiing
- Club: TSK Logatec

World Cup career
- Seasons: 7 – (2016–2020, 2022–present)
- Indiv. starts: 101
- Indiv. podiums: 0
- Team starts: 9
- Team podiums: 0
- Overall titles: 0 – (49th in 2019)
- Discipline titles: 0
- Updated on 29 March 2023

Miha Šimenc (born 21 December 1995) is a Slovenian cross-country skier. He competed at the 2018 and 2022 Winter Olympics.

== Cross-country skiing results ==
All results are sourced from the International Ski Federation (FIS).

=== Olympic Games ===
Year	Age	15 km individual	30 km skiathlon	50 km mass start	Sprint	4 × 10 km relay	Team sprint
2018	22	88	—	—	32	—	21
2022	26	71	—	—	44	14	16

=== World Championships ===
Year	Age	15 km individual	30 km skiathlon	50 km mass start	Sprint	4 × 10 km relay	Team sprint
2017	21	—	—	—	35	—	13
2019	23	—	—	—	33	—	9
2023	27	38	—	DNF	22	11	14

=== World Cup ===
==== Season standings ====
Season	Age	Discipline standings				Ski Tour standings				
Season	Age	Overall	Distance	Sprint	U23	Nordic Opening	Tour de Ski	Ski Tour 2020	World Cup Final	Ski Tour Canada
2016	20	NC	NC	NC	NC	DNF	DNF	—N/a	—N/a	—
2017	21	135	NC	71	14	DNF	DNF	—N/a	—	—N/a
2018	22	133	NC	75	22	85	DNF	—N/a	77	—N/a
2019	23	49	NC	23	—N/a	DNF	DNF	—N/a	54	—N/a
2020	24	53	NC	21	—N/a	DNF	54	DNF	—N/a	—N/a
2022	26	NC	NC	NC	—N/a	—N/a	DNF	—N/a	—N/a	—N/a
2023	27	73	96	34	—N/a	—N/a	DNF	—N/a	—N/a	—N/a
