= Ádám Kónya =

Hungarian cross-country skier (born 1992)

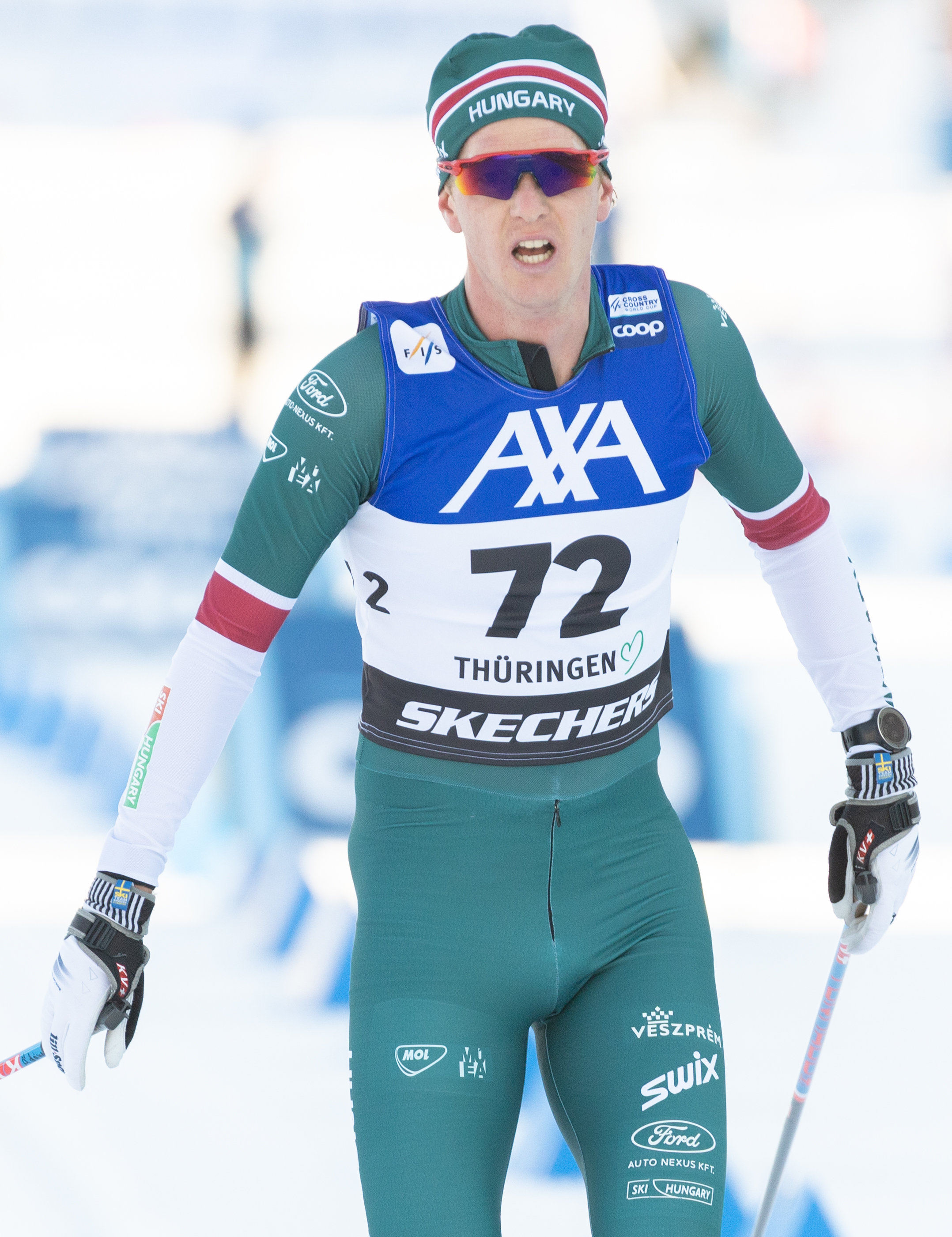
- Kónya in 2026

Personal information
- Nationality: Hungarian
- Born: 19 December 1992 (age 33) Veszprém, Hungary
- Height: 188 cm (6 ft 2 in)
- Weight: 74 kg (163 lb)

Sport
- Sport: Cross-country skiing

Ádám Kónya (born 19 December 1992) is a former Hungarian cross-country skier. He competed in the 2018 Winter Olympics, 2022 Winter Olympics and 2026 Winter Olympics.
