= Dominik Baldauf =

Austrian cross-country skier

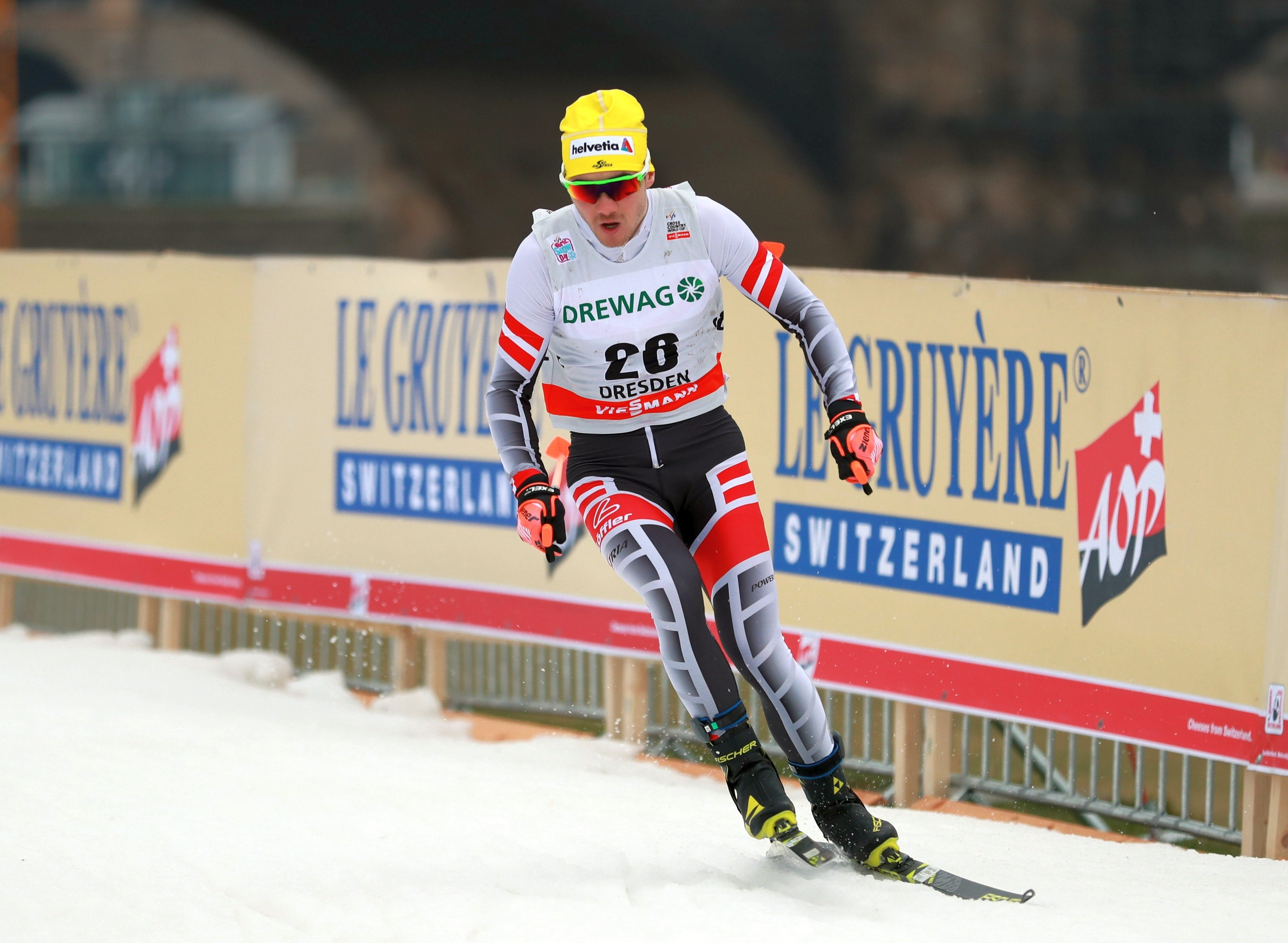

Personal information
- Nationality: Austria
- Born: 23 April 1992 (age 34) Bregenz, Austria

Sport
- Sport: Skiing
- Club: SV Sulzberg-Vorarlberg

World Cup career
- Seasons: 2015–2019
- Indiv. starts: 58
- Indiv. podiums: 0
- Team starts: 5
- Team podiums: 0
- Overall titles: 0 – (77th in 2019)
- Discipline titles: 0
- Updated on 12 April 2019

Dominik Baldauf (born 23 April 1992) is an Austrian cross-country skier from Sulzberg. He competed in the World Cup 2015 season and represented Austria at the FIS Nordic World Ski Championships 2015 in Falun and again in the 2017 World Championships in Lahti.

He competed in the FIS Nordic World Ski Championships 2019 in Seefeld before being arrested for blood doping along with his teammate Max Hauke and three other athletes from Estonia and Kazakhstan. In July 2019, Baldauf was handed a 4-year ban by the Austrian Anti-Doping Commission (ÖADR).

== World Cup results ==
All results are sourced from the International Ski Federation (FIS).

=== World Cup standings ===
Season	Age	Season standings				Ski Tour standings			
Season	Age	Overall	Distance	Sprint	U23	Nordic Opening	Tour de Ski	World Cup Final	Ski Tour Canada
2015	23	119	NC	66	15	DNP	DNF	—N/a	—N/a
2016	24	114	97	74	—N/a	DNP	DNF	—N/a	DNF
2017	25	123	NC	63	—N/a	DNP	DNF	DNP	—N/a
2018	26	84	93	40	—N/a	DNF	DNF	33	—N/a
2019	27	77	92	42	—N/a	DNF	DNF	DNP	—N/a
