= Anamarija Lampič =

Slovenian biathlete and cross-country skier

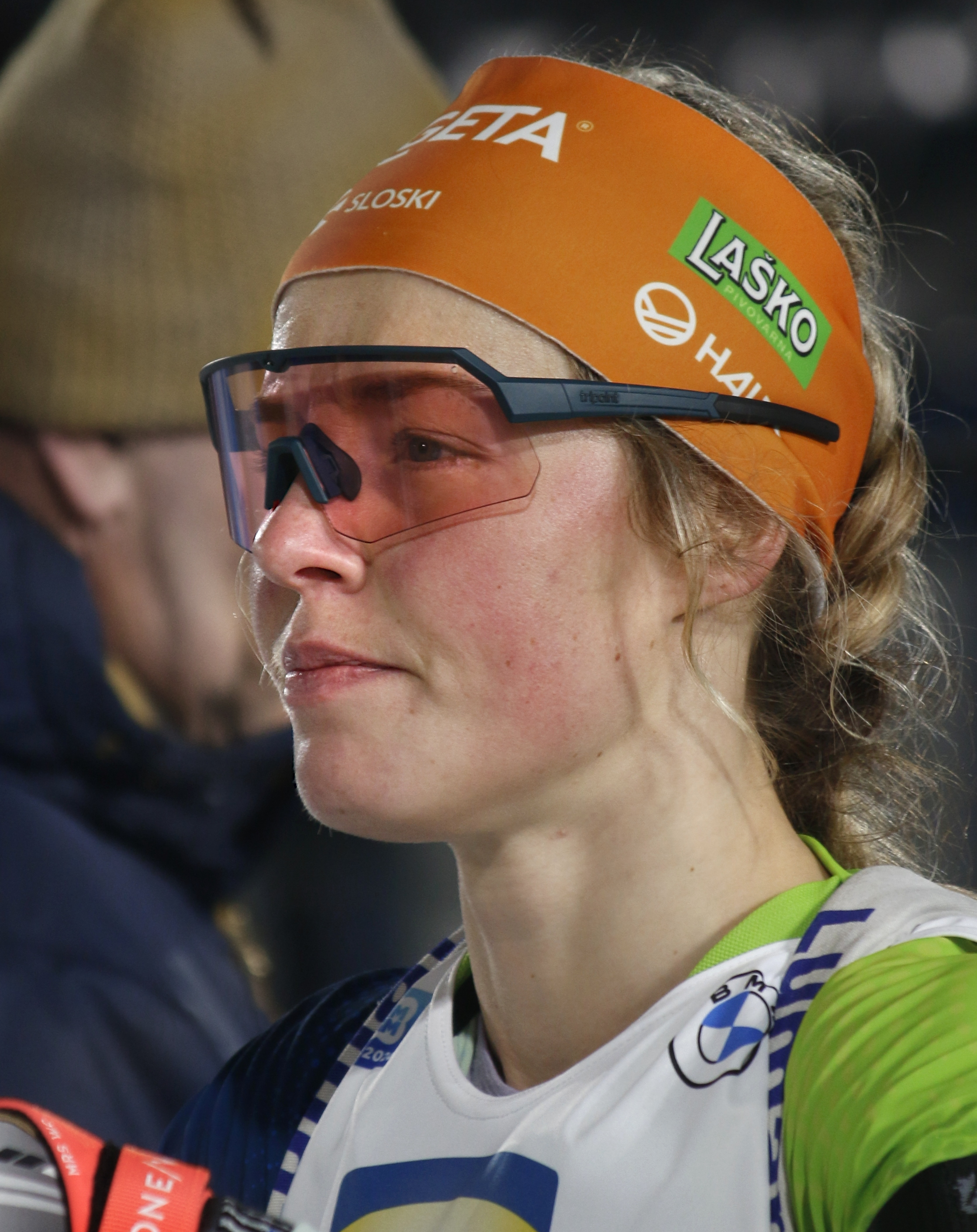
- Lampič in 2024

Personal information
- Nationality: Slovenia
- Born: 17 June 1995 (age 31) Ljubljana, Slovenia
- Height: 1.77 m (5 ft 10 in)

Sport
- Sport: Skiing
- Club: TSK Triglav Kranj

World Cup career
- Seasons: 9 – (2014–2022)
- Indiv. starts: 137
- Indiv. podiums: 14
- Indiv. wins: 3
- Team starts: 14
- Team podiums: 3
- Team wins: 1
- Overall titles: 0 – (8th in 2021, 2022)
- Discipline titles: 2 – (U23 in 2017, SP in 2021)
Medal record
Women's cross-country skiing
Representing Slovenia
World Championships
Silver medal – second place	2019 Seefeld	Team sprint
Bronze medal – third place	2021 Oberstdorf	Individual sprint
Bronze medal – third place	2021 Oberstdorf	Team sprint
Junior World Championships
Bronze medal – third place	2012 Erzurum	4 × 3.33 km relay
- Updated on 14 March 2022

Anamarija Lampič (born 17 June 1995) is a Slovenian biathlete and former cross-country skier. She made her Olympic debut at the 2018 Winter Olympics. She is a triple World Championship medalist.

On 13 May 2022, she announced she was giving up cross-country skiing in favor of biathlon.

== Biography ==
Her father, Janez Lampič was a professional road cyclist who represented Yugoslavia at the 1984 Summer Olympics and competed in the men's team time trial event. Her younger brother, Janez Lampič is also a cross-country skier who competes internationally. Coincidentally, both Janez Lampič and Anamarija Lampič made their Olympic debuts during the 2018 Winter Olympics and competed in the cross-country skiing events.

In August 2026 she announced that she is expecting a baby with her partner Boštjan Klavžar.

== Biathlon results ==
All results are sourced from the International Biathlon Union.

=== Oympic Games ===
0 medals

Event	Individual	Sprint	Pursuit	Mass start	Relay	Mixed relay
(Italy) 2026 Milano Cortina	75th	78th	—	—	16th	—

=== World Championships ===
0 medals

Event	Individual	Sprint	Pursuit	Mass start	Relay	Mixed relay	Single mixed relay
(Germany) 2023 Oberhof	—	58th	51st	—	12th	—	—
(Czech Republic) 2024 Nové Město	58th	36th	28th	—	13th	9th	—
(Switzerland) 2025 Lenzerheide	71st	14th	28th	16th	8th	11th	—

=== World Cup ===
Season	Overall			Individual		Sprint		Pursuit		Mass start	
Season	Races	Points	Position	Points	Position	Points	Position	Points	Position	Points	Position
2022–23	7/20	91	48th	—	—	91	27th	—	—	—	—
2023–24	21/21	378	17th	16	52nd	181	12th	92	23rd	89	14th

==== Individual podiums ====
- 2 podiums

No.	Season	Date	Location	Level	Race	Place
1	2024–25	20 December 2024	(France) Annecy–Le Grand-Bornand	World Cup	Sprint	3rd
2	2024–25	15 March 2025	(Slovenia) Pokljuka	World Cup	Mass Start	3rd

== Cross-country skiing results ==
All results are sourced from the International Ski Federation (FIS).

=== Olympic Games ===
Year	Age	10 km individual	15 km skiathlon	30 km mass start	Sprint	4 × 5 km relay	Team sprint
2018	22	27	—	—	7	8	6
2022	26	17	—	—	12	—	14

=== World Championships ===
- 3 medals – (1 silver, 2 bronze)

Year	Age	10 km individual	15 km skiathlon	30 km mass start	Sprint	4 × 5 km relay	Team sprint
2015	19	—	44	—	36	10	—
2017	21	—	—	—	20	—	8
2019	23	20	—	—	17	9	Silver
2021	25	18	—	21	Bronze	—	Bronze

=== World Cup ===
==== Season titles ====
- 2 titles – (1 Sprint, 1 U23)

Season
Season	Discipline
2017	Under-23
2021	Sprint

==== Season standings ====
Season	Age	Discipline standings				Ski Tour standings				
Season	Age	Overall	Distance	Sprint	U23	Nordic Opening	Tour de Ski	Ski Tour 2020	World Cup Final	Ski Tour Canada
2014	18	NC	—	NC	—N/a	—	—	—N/a	—	—N/a
2015	19	94	—	50	17	—	—	—N/a	—N/a	—N/a
2016	20	47	65	28	6	—	—	—N/a	—N/a	DNF
2017	21	31	59	9	1st place, gold medalist(s)	61	DNF	—N/a	44	—N/a
2018	22	30	30	18	6	48	DNF	—N/a	26	—N/a
2019	23	25	36	17	—N/a	40	22	—N/a	22	—N/a
2020	24	12	18	3rd place, bronze medalist(s)	—N/a	21	19	DNF	—N/a	—N/a
2021	25	8	18	1st place, gold medalist(s)	—N/a	19	15	—N/a	—N/a	—N/a
2022	26	8	27	2nd place, silver medalist(s)	—N/a	—N/a	12	—N/a	—N/a	—N/a

==== Individual podiums ====
- 3 victories – (1 WC, 2 SWC)
- 14 podiums – (10 WC, 4 SWC)

No.	Season	Date	Location	Race	Level	Place
1	2016–17	3 February 2017	Pyeongchang, South Korea	1.4 km Sprint C	World Cup	1st
2	2019–20	29 December 2019	Lenzerheide, Switzerland	1.5 km Sprint F	Stage World Cup	1st
3	2019–20	4 January 2020	Val di Fiemme, Italy	1.3 km Sprint C	Stage World Cup	1st
4	2019–20	11 January 2020	Dresden, Germany	1.3 km Sprint F	World Cup	2nd
5	2019–20	26 January 2020	Oberstdorf, Germany	1.5 km Sprint C	World Cup	2nd
6	2020–21	12 December 2020	Davos, Switzerland	1.5 km Sprint F	World Cup	2nd
7	2020–21	19 December 2020	Dresden, Germany	1.3 km Sprint F	World Cup	3rd
8	2020–21	1 January 2021	Val Müstair, Switzerland	1.7 km Sprint F	Stage World Cup	2nd
9	2020–21	31 January 2021	Falun, Sweden	1.4 km Sprint C	World Cup	2nd
10	2021–22	11 December 2021	Davos, Switzerland	1.5 km Sprint F	World Cup	3rd
11	2021–22	18 December 2021	Dresden, Germany	1.3 km Sprint F	World Cup	3rd
12	2021–22	28 December 2021	Lenzerheide, Switzerland	1.5 km Sprint F	Stage World Cup	3rd
13	2021–22	3 March 2022	Drammen, Norway	1.2 km Sprint C	World Cup	3rd
14	2021–22	11 March 2022	Falun, Sweden	1.4 km Sprint C	World Cup	2nd

==== Team podiums ====
- 1 victory – (1 TS)
- 3 podiums – (3 TS)

No.	Season	Date	Location	Race	Level	Place	Teammate
1	2020–21	20 December 2020	Dresden, Germany	12 × 0.65 km Team Sprint F	World Cup	3rd	Urevc
2	2020–21	7 February 2021	Ulricehamn, Sweden	6 × 1.5 km Team Sprint	World Cup	1st	Urevc
3	2021–22	19 December 2021	Dresden, Germany	12 × 0.65 km Team Sprint F	World Cup	3rd	Urevc
