= James Matthews (hedge fund manager) =

British hedge fund manager and former professional racing driver (born 1975)

- Born: James Spencer Matthews; 21 August 1975 (age 51)
- Occupations: Hedge fund manager; former professional racing driver
- Spouse: Pippa Middleton (m. 2017)
- Children: 3
- Relatives: Spencer Matthews (brother); Vogue Williams (sister-in-law)
- Family: Middleton (by marriage)

James Spencer Matthews (born 21 August 1975) is a British hedge fund manager, former professional racing driver and heir to the Scottish feudal title of Laird of Glen Affric. In 2017, he married Pippa Middleton, the younger sister of Catherine, Princess of Wales.

== Early life and education ==
Matthews is the eldest son of David Matthews, whose father Wallace Matthews worked in the coal industry and then a garage near Rotherham. David Matthews was a car dealer before moving into the luxury hotel business. James' father also owns the resort Eden Rock, St Barths, and is also laird of a 10,000-acre Scottish estate, Glen Affric. James' mother is Zimbabwean-born artist Jane Matthews (née Jane Spencer Parker). Jane Matthews was educated at London's Slade School of Art; she is the daughter of Robert Spencer Parker, an architect. James is the older brother of Spencer Matthews, a former cast member of the reality TV show Made in Chelsea.

The family own the "castle-like" hunting lodge on their Scottish estate. Matthews' brother, Michael, died in 1999 in a mountaineering accident on Mount Everest, hours after becoming the youngest Briton to conquer the peak. Matthews boarded at Uppingham School, in Rutland. He trained as a securities trader at Spear, Leeds & Kellogg, now part of Goldman Sachs. In 1997 Matthews moved to a finance house called Nordic Options Ltd, which de-merged from Spear, where he became a senior equity options trader.

== Career ==
=== Racing ===
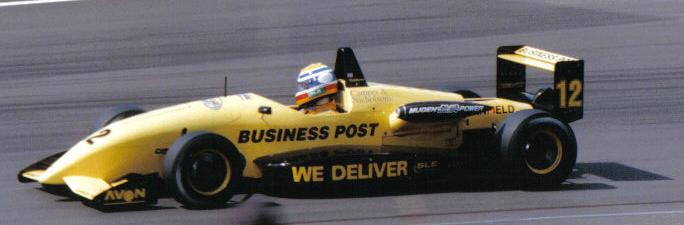
Matthews racing in 1995

As a racing driver, Matthews has competed in such series as the British Formula 3 Championship. He won the British Formula Renault Championship title in 1994 for Manor Motorsport. He won the Eurocup Formula Renault in the same year.

=== City career ===
Matthews became a City of London trader in 1995 and in 2001 was co-founder of Eden Rock Capital Management (named after his father's Eden Rock hotel), of which he is now Chief Executive. By 2007, the firm was reported to be managing over £1 billion in assets, and in 2017, David Friedman estimated that Matthews was "a demi-billionaire or close to a billionaire on his own merits".

It was reported in July 2016 that Matthews' Eden Rock Capital Management fund was a major investor in a collapsed Scottish company at the heart of a £90 million fraud investigation.

=== Glen Affric ===
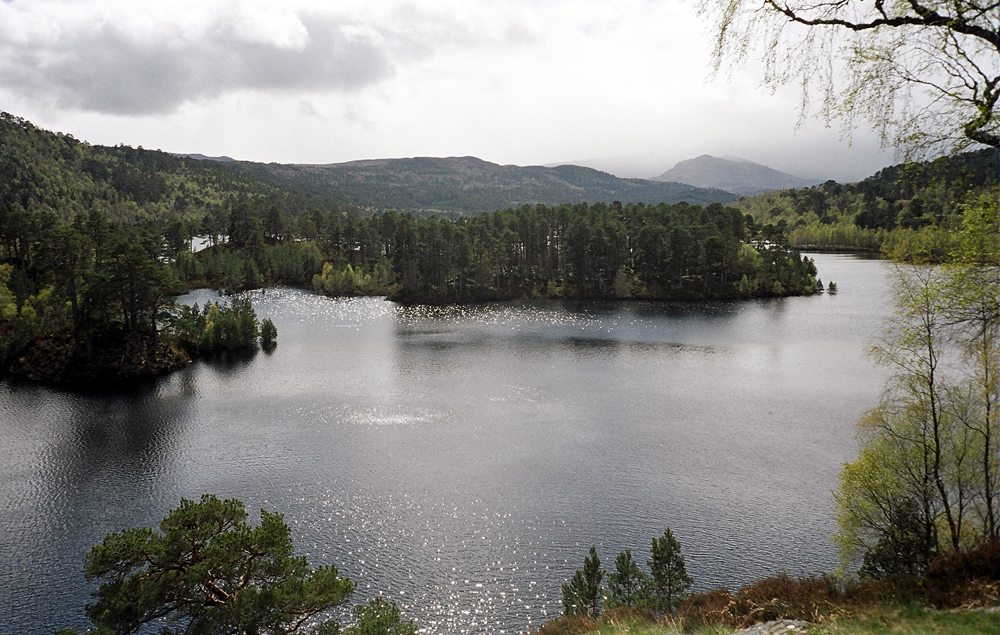
Matthews is the managing director and heir to the 10,000 acre Glen Affric Estate

According to documents lodged with Companies House, James Matthews has been, since 2007, the "solitary managing director of Beaufort Glen Affric Ltd". The 10,000-acre (4,000 ha) Glen Affric Estate is in the Scottish Highlands. As eldest son, upon his father's death, Matthews will inherit the courtesy title of Laird of Glen Affric. Until that time he is able to use, should he choose to do so, the title, James Matthews of Glen Affric the Younger.

Matthews' brother-in-law, James Middleton, was reported in The Times in 2018 as hosting deer stalking parties at Glen Affric Estate.

== Personal life ==
In July 2016, it was reported that Matthews had become engaged to Pippa Middleton, sister of Catherine, Princess of Wales. Matthews and Middleton were married on 20 May 2017.

Their son was born in 2018 at St Mary's Hospital, London. Their elder daughter was born in 2021. Their second daughter was born in 2022. The family lives on the Barton Court estate near the village of Kintbury, West Berkshire, close to the River Kennet. In 2026, a planning inquiry rejected a proposal to formally recognise a disputed route through the estate as a public footpath, following an application by West Berkshire Ramblers and objections from Matthews, who cited security concerns.

Matthews is fond of endurance events having competed in the 251 km (156 miles) Marathon des Sables, the 76 km (47 miles) swim and run competition Ötillö, and the 54 km (34 mi) long-distance cross-country ski marathon Birkebeinerrennet.

In 2021, Matthews and his wife bought Bucklebury Farm Park for around £1.3 million. In 2026, it was reported that the couple was selling the property.

Sporting positions
| Preceded by Ivan Arias | British Formula Renault; UK series champion 1994 | Succeeded by Guy Smith |
| Preceded by Olivier Couvreur | Eurocup Formula Renault champion 1994 | Succeeded by Cyrille Sauvage |
Awards
| Preceded by Dario Franchitti | Autosport; British Club Driver of the Year; 1994 | Succeeded by Guy Smith |
