= Ski Classics =

Series of cross-country skiing competitions

- Status: active
- Genre: sporting event series
- Date: Northern winter
- Frequency: annual
- Inaugurated: 2011

Ski Classics is a world championship series within cross-country ski races in classic style that has been held since 2011. In season XII, 2021–2022, the circuit included 15 events, in a professional tour for the 35 Pro Teams involved. From 2015 to 2022, the official name of the circuit was Visma Ski Classics, thanks to their main sponsor. The special thing about the Ski Classics concept is that anyone can start the races: professional or amateur, male or female, 25 or 75 years old. Everyone stands together on the same starting line to face the same weather conditions and the same course.

Ski Classics has also, since April 2019, launched the concept of Challengers. This tour has been created to connect and promote long distance skiing events worldwide. By autumn 2021, 39 races were on the Challenger calendar, combining cross-country skiing in winter and roller skiing throughout the year.

== History ==
The cup was first arranged in 2011. The Czech skier Stanislav Řezáč won the men's overall cup, and the Swiss skier Seraina Boner won the ladies' overall cup.

In 2012, the cup consisted of 7 races. The races were Jizerská padesátka, Marcialonga, König Ludwig Lauf, Tartu Maraton, Vasaloppet, Birkebeinerrennet and the final Norefjellrennet which was cancelled because of lack of snow. The Norwegian cross country skier Anders Aukland won the overall cup. He participated for the Norwegian team Team Xtra Personell. The Swedish skier Jenny Hansson won the ladies' overall cup.

In 2013, the cup consisted of 6 races, Jizerská padesátka, Marcialonga, König Ludwig Lauf, Vasaloppet, Birkebeinerrennet and Årefjällslopet. It is an overall-cup, a sprintpoints-cup, a youth-cup and a team competition. The most profiled teams are Team Xtra Personell, Team United Bakeries, Team Coop, Team Tynell, Team Skinfit Racing Team and Team Skigo.

In 2014, the cup consisted of 6 races, among them La Diagonela, Marcialonga and Vasaloppet. Rickard Tynell won the first race, held in Switzerland due to lack of snow in Czech Republic.

== Season I 2010-11 ==
| Event | Distance | Country | Men | Team | Women | Team |
|---|---|---|---|---|---|---|
| Jizerská padesátka | 50km | Czech Republic | (Norway) Anders Aukland | Team Xtra Personell | (Sweden) Sandra Hansson | Team United Bakeries |
| Marcialonga | 70km | Italy | (Sweden) Jerry Ahrlin | Team Xtra Personell | (Switzerland) Seraina Boner | Engadin Skimarathon Team |
| König-Ludwig-Lauf | 50km | Germany | (Sweden) Jerry Ahrlin | Team Xtra Personell | (Sweden) Sandra Hansson | Team United Bakeries |
| Vasaloppet | 90km | Sweden | (Sweden) Jörgen Brink | Team United Bakeries | (Sweden) Jenny Grip | Team Exspirit |
| Birkebeinerrennet | 54km | Norway | (Czech Republic) Stanislav Řezáč | Patria Direct Team | (Switzerland) Seraina Boner | Engadin Skimarathon Team |
| Norefjellrennet | 60km | Norway | (Norway) Anders Aukland | Team Xtra Personell | (Switzerland) Seraina Boner | Engadin Skimarathon Team |

== Season II 2011-12 ==
| Event | Distance | Country | Men | Team | Women | Team |
|---|---|---|---|---|---|---|
| Jizerská padesátka | 50km | Czech Republic | (Czech Republic) Stanislav Řezáč | Patria Direct Team | (Norway) Sara Svendsen | Team Xtra Personell |
| Marcialonga | 70km | Italy | (Norway) Jørgen Aukland | Team Xtra Personell | (Sweden) Susanne Nyström | Team Exspirit |
| König-Ludwig-Lauf | 50km | Germany | (Czech Republic) Stanislav Řezáč | Patria Direct Team | (Sweden) Susanne Nyström | Team Exspirit |
| Tartu Maraton | 63km | Estonia | (Sweden) Jörgen Brink | Team United Bakeries | (Sweden) Susanne Nyström | Team Exspirit |
| Vasaloppet | 90km | Sweden | (Sweden) Jörgen Brink | Team United Bakeries | (Norway) Vibeke Skofterud | |
| Birkebeinerrennet | 54km | Norway | (Norway) Anders Aukland | Team Xtra Personell | (Switzerland) Seraina Boner | Team Exspirit |
| Vålådalen | 50km | Sweden | (Norway) Anders Aukland | Team Xtra Personell | (Switzerland) Seraina Boner | Team Exspirit |

== Season III 2012-13 ==
| Event | Distance | Country | Men | Team | Women | Team |
|---|---|---|---|---|---|---|
| Jizerská padesátka | 50km | Czech Republic | (Norway) Anders Aukland | Team Xtra Personell | (Ukraine) Valentina Shevchenko | Ixmind Racing Team |
| Marcialonga | 70km | Italy | (Norway) Jørgen Aukland | Team Xtra Personell | (Switzerland) Seraina Boner | Team Coop |
| König-Ludwig-Lauf | 50km | Germany | (Sweden) Jerry Ahrlin | Team Xtra Personell | (Switzerland) Seraina Boner | Team Coop |
| Vasaloppet | 90km | Sweden | (Norway) Jørgen Aukland | Team Xtra Personell | (Norway) Laila Kveli | Team Xtra Personell |
| Birkebeinerrennet | 54km | Norway | (Norway) Anders Aukland | Team Xtra Personell | (Switzerland) Seraina Boner | Team Coop |
| Årefjällsloppet | 75km | Sweden | (Norway) Jørgen Aukland | Team Xtra Personell | (Switzerland) Seraina Boner | Team Coop |
| Årefjällsloppet | 75km | Sweden | (Norway) Anders Aukland | Team Xtra Personell | (Switzerland) Seraina Boner | Team Coop |

== Season IV 2013-14 ==
| Event | Distance | Country | Men | Team | Women | Team |
|---|---|---|---|---|---|---|
| La Diagonela | 50 km | Switzerland | (Sweden) Rikard Tynell | Team Tynell | (Switzerland) Seraina Boner | Team Coop |
| Marcialonga | 70km | Italy | (Norway) Simen Østensen | Team Centric | (Belarus) Julia Tikhonova | Russian Marathon Team |
| König-Ludwig-Lauf | 50km | Germany | (Norway) Johan Kjølstad | Team United Bakeries | (Switzerland) Seraina Boner | Team Coop |
| Vasaloppet | 90km | Sweden | (Norway) John Kristian Dahl | Team United Bakeries | (Norway) Laila Kveli | Team Centric |
| Årefjällsloppet | 75km | Sweden | (Sweden) Daniel Richardsson | Helsinge Ski Team | (Sweden) Charlotte Kalla | |

== Season V 2014-15 ==
| Event | Distance | Country | Men | Team | Women | Team |
|---|---|---|---|---|---|---|
| La Sgambeda | 35km | Italy | (Norway) Anders Aukland | Team Santander | (Switzerland) Seraina Boner | Team Coop |
| Jizerská padesátka | 50km | Czech Republic | (Norway) Morten Eide Pedersen | Team Coop | (Austria) Kateřina Smutná | Team Santander |
| La Diagonela | 50 km | Switzerland | (Norway) Øystein Pettersen | Team United Bakeries | (Japan) Masako Ishida | Team United Bakeries |
| Marcialonga | 70km | Italy | (Norway) Tord Asle Gjerdalen | Team Santander | (Austria) Kateřina Smutná | Team Santander |
| König-Ludwig-Lauf | 50km | Germany | (Norway) Petter Eliassen | Team Leaseplan | (Sweden) Britta Johansson Norgren | Team SkiProAM |
| Vasaloppet | 90km | Sweden | (Norway) Petter Eliassen | Team Leaseplan | (Poland) Justyna Kowalczyk | Russian Marathon Team |
| Birkebeinerrennet | 54km | Norway | (Norway) Petter Eliassen | Team Leaseplan | (Norway) Therese Johaug | |
| Årefjällsloppet | 50km | Sweden | (Norway) Petter Eliassen | Team Leaseplan | (Switzerland) Seraina Boner | Team Coop |

== Season VI 2015-16 ==
| Event | Distance | Country | Men | Team | Women | Team |
|---|---|---|---|---|---|---|
| La Sgambeda | 35km | Italy | (Norway) John Kristian Dahl | Team United Bakeries | (Austria) Kateřina Smutná | Team Santander |
| Jizerská padesátka | 50km | Czech Republic | (Norway) Petter Eliassen | Team Leaseplan | (Sweden) Britta Johansson Norgren | Lager 157 Ski Team |
| La Diagonela | 50km | Switzerland | (Norway) Petter Eliassen | Team Leaseplan | (Sweden) Britta Johansson Norgren | Lager 157 Ski Team |
| Marcialonga | 70km | Italy | (Norway) Tord Asle Gjerdalen | Team Santander | (Sweden) Britta Johansson Norgren | Lager 157 Ski Team |
| Kaiser Maximilian Lauf | 50km | Austria | (Norway) Petter Eliassen | Team Leaseplan | (Switzerland) Seraina Boner | Team Exspirit |
| Toblach-Cortina | 30km | Italy | (Norway) Tord Asle Gjerdalen | Team Santander | (Sweden) Britta Johansson Norgren | Lager 157 Ski Team |
| Vasaloppet | 90km | Sweden | (Norway) John Kristian Dahl | Team United Bakeries | (Austria) Kateřina Smutná | Team Santander |
| Birkebeinerrennet | 54km | Norway | (Norway) John Kristian Dahl | Team United Bakeries | (Switzerland) Seraina Boner | Team Exspirit |
| Årefjällsloppet | 55km | Sweden | (Norway) Johan Kjølstad | Team United Bakeries | (Poland) Justyna Kowalczyk | Team Santander |

== Season VII 2016-17 ==
| Event | Distance | Country | Men | Team | Women | Team |
|---|---|---|---|---|---|---|
| Prologue | 8km | Switzerland | (Norway) Petter Eliassen | Team Leaseplan | (Czech Republic) Kateřina Smutná | Team Santander |
| La Sgambeda | 35km | Italy | (Norway) Tord Asle Gjerdalen | Team Santander | (Sweden) Britta Johansson Norgren | Lager 157 Ski Team |
| Vasaloppet China | 50km | China | (Norway) Andreas Nygaard | Team Santander | (Russia) Olga Rotcheva | Russian Marathon Team |
| Kaiser Maximilian Lauf | 50km | Austria | (Norway) Andreas Nygaard | Team Santander | (Czech Republic) Kateřina Smutná | Team Santander |
| La Diagonela | 50km | Switzerland | (Russia) Ilya Chernousov | Russian Marathon Team | (Czech Republic) Kateřina Smutná | Team Santander |
| Marcialonga | 70km | Italy | (Norway) Tord Asle Gjerdalen | Team Santander | (Czech Republic) Kateřina Smutná | Team Santander |
| Toblach-Cortina | 50km | Italy | (Norway) Tord Asle Gjerdalen | Team Santander | (Czech Republic) Kateřina Smutná | Team Santander |
| Jizerská padesátka | 50km | Czech Republic | (Norway) Morten Eide Pedersen | Team BN Bank | (Czech Republic) Kateřina Smutná | Team Santander |
| Vasaloppet | 90km | Sweden | (Norway) John Kristian Dahl | Team United Bakeries | (Sweden) Britta Johansson Norgren | Lager 157 Ski Team |
| Birkebeinerrennet | 54km | Norway | (Norway) Martin Johnsrud Sundby | Team United Bakeries | (Poland) Justyna Kowalczyk | Team Santander |
| Årefjällsloppet | 55km | Sweden | (Norway) Anders Aukland | Team Santander | (Sweden) Britta Johansson Norgren | Lager 157 Ski Team |
| Reistadløpet | 54km | Norway | (Norway) Petter Eliassen | Team Leaseplan | (Poland) Justyna Kowalczyk | Team Santander |
| Ylläs-Levi | 70km | Finland | (Norway) Petter Eliassen | Team Leaseplan | (Czech Republic) Kateřina Smutná | Team Santander |

== Season VIII 2017-18 ==
| Event | Distance | Country | Men | Team | Women | Team |
|---|---|---|---|---|---|---|
| Pro Team Tempo | 15km | Switzerland | Lager 157 Ski Team | | Lager 157 Ski Team | |
| La Sgambeda | 35km | Italy | (Norway) Andreas Nygaard | Team Santander | (Sweden) Britta Johansson Norgren | Lager 157 Ski Team |
| Kaiser Maximilian Lauf | 60km | Austria | (Norway) Tord Asle Gjerdalen | Team Santander | (Sweden) Britta Johansson Norgren | Lager 157 Ski Team |
| La Diagonela | 65km | Switzerland | (Norway) Tord Asle Gjerdalen | Team Santander | (Sweden) Britta Johansson Norgren | Lager 157 Ski Team |
| Marcialonga | 70km | Italy | (Russia) Ilya Chernousov | Bauer Ski Team | (Sweden) Britta Johansson Norgren | Lager 157 Ski Team |
| Toblach-Cortina | 50km | Italy | (Norway) Tord Asle Gjerdalen | Team Santander | (Sweden) Britta Johansson Norgren | Lager 157 Ski Team |
| Jizerská padesátka | 50km | Czech Republic | (Norway) Morten Eide Pedersen | Team BN Bank | (Sweden) Britta Johansson Norgren | Lager 157 Ski Team |
| Vasaloppet | 90km | Sweden | (Norway) Andreas Nygaard | Team Santander | (Sweden) Lina Korsgren | Team Åre Längdskidklubb |
| Birkebeinerrennet | 54km | Norway | (Norway) Andreas Nygaard | Team Santander | (Poland) Justyna Kowalczyk | Team Trentino Robinson Trainer |
| Reistadløpet | 54km | Norway | (Norway) Tord Asle Gjerdalen | Team Santander | (Japan) Masako Ishida | Team United Bakeries |
| Ylläs-Levi | 70km | Finland | (Norway) Andreas Nygaard | Team Santander | (Norway) Astrid Øyre Slind | Team United Bakeries |

== Season IX 2018-19 ==
| Event | Distance | Country | Men | Team | Women | Team |
|---|---|---|---|---|---|---|
| Pro Team Tempo | 15km | Switzerland | Team Kaffebryggeriet | | Lager 157 Ski Team | |
| La Sgambeda | 35km | Italy | (Norway) Øystein Pettersen | Team BN Bank | (Sweden) Britta Johansson Norgren | Lager 157 Ski Team |
| Kaiser Maximilian Lauf | 60km | Austria | (Norway) Petter Eliassen | Team BN Bank | (Sweden) Britta Johansson Norgren | Lager 157 Ski Team |
| La Diagonela | 65km | Switzerland | (Norway) Andreas Nygaard | Team Ragde Eiendom | (Czech Republic) Kateřina Smutná | ED System Bauer Team |
| Marcialonga | 70km | Italy | (Norway) Petter Eliassen | Team BN Bank | (Sweden) Britta Johansson Norgren | Lager 157 Ski Team |
| Jizerská padesátka | 50km | Czech Republic | (Norway) Andreas Nygaard | Team Ragde Eiendom | (Sweden) Lina Korsgren | Team Ramudden |
| Vasaloppet | 90km | Sweden | (Norway) Tore Bjørseth Berdal | Team Koteng | (Sweden) Britta Johansson Norgren | Lager 157 Ski Team |
| Engadin Ski Marathon | 42km | Switzerland | (Switzerland) Dario Cologna | (Switzerland) Natalie Von Siebenthal | | |
| Birkebeinerrennet | 54km | Norway | (Norway) Petter Eliassen | Team BN Bank | (Poland) Justyna Kowalczyk | Team Trentino Robinson Trainer |
| Reistadløpet | 54km | Norway | (Norway) Mikael Gunnulfsen | Team Telemark | (Norway) Astrid Øyre Slind | Team Koteng |
| Ylläs-Levi | 70km | Finland | (Norway) Andreas Nygaard | Team Ragde Eiendom | (Norway) Astrid Øyre Slind | Team Koteng |

== Season X 2019-20 ==
| Event | Distance | Country | Men | Team | Women | Team |
|---|---|---|---|---|---|---|
| Pro Team Prologue | 15km | Switzerland | Team Ragde Eiendom | | Lager 157 Ski Team | |
| Individual Prologue | 35km | Italy | (Sweden) Emil Persson | Lager 157 Ski Team | (Sweden) Britta Johansson Norgren | Lager 157 Ski Team |
| La Venosta | 35km | Italy | (Russia) Ermil Vokuev | Russian Winter Team | (Norway) Astrid Øyre Slind | Team Koteng |
| Kaiser Maximilian Lauf | 60km | Austria | (Sweden) Emil Persson | Lager 157 Ski Team | (Sweden) Lina Korsgren | Team Ramudden |
| La Diagonela | 65km | Switzerland | (Norway) Chris Andre Jespersen | Team Koteng | (Norway) Astrid Øyre Slind | Team Koteng |
| Marcialonga | 70km | Italy | (Norway) Tore Bjørseth Berdal | Team Koteng | (Norway) Kari Vikhagen Gjeitnes | Team Koteng |
| Toblach-Cortina | 50km | Italy | (Norway) Andreas Nygaard | Team Ragde Eiendom | (Sweden) Britta Johansson Norgren | Lager 157 Ski Team |
| Jizerská padesátka | 50km | Czech Republic | (Norway) Andreas Nygaard | Team Ragde Eiendom | (Sweden) Britta Johansson Norgren | Lager 157 Ski Team |
| Vasaloppet | 90km | Sweden | (Norway) Petter Eliassen | Team Ragde Eiendom | (Sweden) Lina Korsgren | Team Ramudden |

== Season XI 2020-21 ==
| Event | Distance | Country | Men | Team | Women | Team |
|---|---|---|---|---|---|---|
| La Diagonela | 54km | Switzerland | (Sweden) Oskar Kardin | Team Ragde Eiendom | (Sweden) Jenny Larsson | Team Ramudden |
| Toblach-Cortina | 40km | Italy | (Russia) Ermil Vokuev | Russian Winter Team | (Sweden) Lina Korsgren | Team Ramudden |
| Marcialonga | 70km | Italy | (Sweden) Emil Persson | Lager 157 Ski Team | (Sweden) Lina Korsgren | Team Ramudden |
| Jizerská padesátka | 50km | Czech Republic | (Sweden) Emil Persson | Lager 157 Ski Team | (Sweden) Lina Korsgren | Team Ramudden |
| Vasaloppet | 90km | Sweden | (Norway) Tord Asle Gjerdalen | Team XPND | (Sweden) Lina Korsgren | Team Ramudden |
| Vålådalsrennet | 54km | Sweden | (Sweden) Emil Persson | Lager 157 Ski Team | (Sweden) Ebba Andersson | Lager 157 Ski Team |
| Tåssåsen Criterium | 54km | Sweden | (Sweden) Emil Persson | Lager 157 Ski Team | (Sweden) Lina Korsgren | Team Ramudden |
| Årefjällsloppet | 100km | Sweden | (Norway) Andreas Nygaard | Team Ragde Eiendom | (Sweden) Lina Korsgren | Team Ramudden |

== Season XII 2021-22 ==
| Event | Distance | Country | Men | Team | Women | Team |
|---|---|---|---|---|---|---|
| Orsa Grönklitt Pro Team Tempo | 15km | Sweden | Team Ragde Charge | | Lager 157 Ski Team | |
| Orsa Grönklitt Individual Prologue | 45km | Sweden | (Sweden) Emil Persson | Lager 157 Ski Team | (Norway) Astrid Øyre Slind | Team Koteng Eidissen |
| Pustertaler Ski Marathon | 62km | Italy | (Sweden) Max Novak | Team Ramudden | (Sweden) Britta Johansson Norgren | Lager 157 Ski Team |
| Prato Piazza Mountain Challenge | 30km | Italy | (Sweden) Johannes Eklof | Team Ramudden | (Sweden) Ida Dahl | Team Ramudden |
| La Venosta Time Trial | 10km | Italy | (Norway) Tord Asle Gjerdalen | Team XPND Fuel | (Sweden) Britta Johansson Norgren | Lager 157 Ski Team |
| Engadin La Diagonela | 55km | Switzerland | (Norway) Kaspar Stadaas | Team Ragde Charge | (Sweden) Ida Dahl | Team Ramudden |
| Marcialonga | 70km | Italy | Ermil Vokuev | Russian Winter Team | (Sweden) Ida Dahl | Team Ramudden |
| Jizerská padesátka | 50km | Czech Republic | (Norway) Andreas Nygaard | Team Ragde Charge | (Sweden) Ida Dahl | Team Ramudden |
| Tartu Maraton | 63km | Estonia | (Sweden) Emil Persson | Lager 157 Ski Team | (Sweden) Britta Johansson Norgren | Lager 157 Ski Team |
| Vasaloppet | 90km | Sweden | (Norway) Andreas Nygaard | Team Ragde Charge | (Norway) Astrid Øyre Slind | Team Koteng Eidissen |
| Birkebeinerrennet | 54km | Norway | (Norway) Andreas Nygaard | Team Ragde Charge | (Norway) Astrid Øyre Slind | Team Koteng Eidissen |
| Årefjällsloppet | 100km | Sweden | (Norway) Kasper Stadaas | Team Ragde Charge | (Norway) Astrid Øyre Slind | Team Koteng Eidissen |
| Reistadløpet | 54km | Norway | (Norway) Martin Løwstrøm Nyenget | Team Eksjohus | (Sweden) Ebba Andersson | Lager 157 Ski Team |
| Ylläs-Levi | 70km | Finland | (Sweden) Emil Persson | Lager 157 Ski Team | (Sweden) Britta Johansson Norgren | Lager 157 Ski Team |

== Standings ==
=== Champion Men ===
| Year | Season | Winner | Team | Second | Team | Third | Team |
|---|---|---|---|---|---|---|---|
| 2010-11 | I | (Czech Republic) Stanislav Řezáč | Patria Direct Team | (Sweden) Jerry Ahrlin | Team Xtra Personell | (Norway) Anders Aukland | Team Xtra Personell |
| 2011-12 | II | (Norway) Anders Aukland | Team Xtra Personell | (Czech Republic) Stanislav Řezáč | Patria Direct Team | (Sweden) Jörgen Brink | Team United Bakeries |
| 2012-13 | III | (Norway) Anders Aukland | Team Xtra Personell | (Norway) Jörgen Aukland | Team Xtra Personell | (Czech Republic) Stanislav Řezáč | Team Xtra Personell |
| 2013-14 | IV | (Norway) Johan Kjølstad | Team United Bakeries | (Norway) John Kristian Dahl | Team United Bakeries | (Norway) Simen Østensen | Team Centric |
| 2014-15 | V | (Norway) Petter Eliassen | Team Leaseplan | (Norway) Anders Aukland | Team Santander | (Norway) Tord Asle Gjerdalen | Team Santander |
| 2015-16 | VI | (Norway) Petter Eliassen | Team Leaseplan | (Norway) Tord Asle Gjerdalen | Team Santander | (Norway) John Kristian Dahl | Team United Bakeries |
| 2016-17 | VII | (Norway) Tord Asle Gjerdalen | Team Santander | (Norway) Petter Eliassen | Team Leaseplan | (Norway) Andreas Nygaard | Team Santander |
| 2017-18 | VIII | (Norway) Tord Asle Gjerdalen | Team Santander | (Norway) Andreas Nygaard | Team Santander | (Norway) Morten Eide Pedersen | Team BN Bank |
| 2018-19 | IX | (Norway) Andreas Nygaard | Team Ragde Eiendom | (Norway) Petter Eliassen | Team BN Bank | (Norway) Tord Asle Gjerdalen | Team Ragde Eiendom |
| 2019-20 | X | (Norway) Andreas Nygaard | Team Ragde Eiendom | (Norway) Tord Asle Gjerdalen | Team Ragde Eiendom | (Norway) Stian Hoelgaard | Team Koteng |
| 2020-21 | XI | (Sweden) Emil Persson | Lager 157 Ski Team | (Norway) Tord Asle Gjerdalen | Team XPND | (Sweden) Oskar Kardin | Team Ragde Eiendom |

=== Champion Women ===
| Year | Season | Winner | Team | Second | Team | Third | Team |
|---|---|---|---|---|---|---|---|
| 2010-11 | I | (Switzerland) Seraina Boner | Engadin Skimarathon Team | (Sweden) Susanne Nyström | Team Exspirit | (Sweden) Jenny Hansson | Team Exspirit |
| 2011-12 | II | (Sweden) Jenny Hansson | Team Exspirit | (Sweden) Susanne Nyström | Team Exspirit | (Switzerland) Seraina Boner | Team Exspirit |
| 2012-13 | III | (Switzerland) Seraina Boner | Team Coop | (Norway) Laila Kveli | Team Xtra Personell | (Sweden) Jenny Hansson | Team Coop |
| 2013-14 | IV | (Switzerland) Seraina Boner | Team Coop | (Norway) Laila Kveli | Team Centric | (Sweden) Susanne Nyström | Team Centric |
| 2014-15 | V | (Austria) Kateřina Smutná | Silvini Madshus Team | (Switzerland) Seraina Boner | Team Coop | (Sweden) Britta Johansson Norgren | Team SkiProAM |
| 2015-16 | VI | (Sweden) Britta Johansson Norgren | Lager 157 Ski Team | (Switzerland) Seraina Boner | Team Exspirit | (Austria) Kateřina Smutná | Team Santander |
| 2016-17 | VII | (Sweden) Britta Johansson Norgren | Lager 157 Ski Team | (Czech Republic) Kateřina Smutná | Team Santander | (Norway) Astrid Øyre Slind | Team United Bakeries |
| 2017-18 | VIII | (Sweden) Britta Johansson Norgren | Lager 157 Ski Team | (Czech Republic) Kateřina Smutná | Bauer Ski Team | (Sweden) Lina Korsgren | Team Åre Längdskidklubb |
| 2018-19 | IX | (Sweden) Britta Johansson Norgren | Lager 157 Ski Team | (Norway) Astrid Øyre Slind | Team Koteng | (Czech Republic) Kateřina Smutná | ED System Bauer Team |
| 2019-20 | X | (Sweden) Britta Johansson Norgren | Lager 157 Ski Team | (Norway) Kari Vikhagen Gjeitnes | Team Koteng | (Czech Republic) Kateřina Smutná | ED System Bauer Team |
| 2020-21 | XI | (Sweden) Lina Korsgren | Team Ramudden | (Sweden) Ida Dahl | Team Ramudden | (Norway) Emilie Fleten | Team Koteng |

=== Sprint Competition Men ===
| År | Säsong | 1:a |
| 2021 | XI | Emil Persson Lager 157 Ski Team |
| 2020 | X | Stian Berg Team Kaffebryggeriet |
| 2019 | IX | Anton Karlsson Lager 157 Ski Team |
| 2018 | VIII | Anton Karlsson Lager 157 Ski Team |
| 2017 | VII | Andreas Nygaard Team Santander |
| 2016 | VI | Andreas Nygaard Team Santander |
| 2015 | V | Øystein Pettersen Team United Bakeries |
| 2014 | IV | John Kristian Dahl Team United Bakeries |
| 2013 | III | Simen Østensen Team Xtra Personell |
| 2012 | II | Stanislav Řezáč Patria Direct Team |
| 2011 | I | Jerry Ahrlin Team Xtra Personell |

=== Sprint Competition Women ===
| År | Säsong | 1:a |
| 2021 | XI | Lina Korsgren Team Ramudden |
| 2020 | X | Lina Korsgren Team Ramudden |
| 2019 | IX | Britta Johansson Norgren Lager 157 Ski Team |
| 2018 | VIII | Britta Johansson Norgren Lager 157 Ski Team |
| 2017 | VII | Britta Johansson Norgren Lager 157 Ski Team |

=== Climb Competition Men ===
| År | Säsong | 1:a |
| 2021 | XI | Ermil Vokuev Russian Winter Team |
| 2020 | X | Morten Eide Pedersen Team Kaffebryggeriet |
| 2019 | IX | Morten Eide Pedersen Team BN Bank |
| 2018 | VIII | Morten Eide Pedersen Team BN Bank |

=== Climb Competition Women ===
| År | Säsong | 1:a |
| 2021 | XI | Lina Korsgren Team Ramudden |
| 2020 | X | Britta Johansson Norgren Lager 157 Ski Team |
| 2019 | IX | Astrid Øyre Slind Team Koteng |
| 2018 | VIII | Britta Johansson Norgren Lager 157 Ski Team |

=== Youth Competition Men ===
| År | Säsong | 1:a |
| 2021 | XI | Emil Persson Lager 157 Ski Team |
| 2020 | X | Max Novak Team Ramudden |
| 2019 | IX | Torleif Syrstad Team Koteng |
| 2018 | VIII | Oskar Kardin Team Santander |
| 2017 | VII | Stian Hoelgaard Team Leaseplan |
| 2016 | VI | Stian Hoelgaard Team Leaseplan |
| 2015 | V | Anders Høst Team Leaseplan |
| 2014 | IV | Christoffer Callesen Team Leaseplan |
| 2013 | III | Morten Eide Pedersen Team Coop |
| 2012 | II | Morten Eide Pedersen Team Birken |
| 2011 | I | Morten Eide Pedersen Team Birken |

=== Youth Competition Women ===
| År | Säsong | 1:a |
| 2021 | XI | Ida Dahl Team Ramudden |
| 2020 | X | Ida Dahl Team Ramudden |
| 2019 | IX | Sofie Elebro Team Ragde Eiendom |
| 2018 | VIII | Evelina Bångman Team Mäenpää |
| 2017 | VII | Evelina Bångman Team SkiProAm |
| 2016 | VI | Emilia Lindstedt Team SkiProAm |
| 2015 | V | Tone Sundvor Team Synnfjell |
| 2014 | IV | Tuva Toftdahl Staver Team Coop |
| 2013 | III | Laila Kveli Team Xtra Personell |
| 2012 | II | Laila Kveli Team Xtra Personell |
| 2011 | I | Laila Kveli Team Xtra Personell |

=== Pro Team Competition ===
| År | Säsong | 1:a | 2:a | 3:a |
| 2021 | XI | Team Ramudden | Lager 157 Ski Team | Team Ragde Eiendom |
| 2020 | X | Team Ragde Eiendom | Lager 157 Ski Team | Team Koteng |
| 2019 | IX | Team Koteng | Team Ragde Eiendom | Lager 157 Ski Team |
| 2018 | VIII | Team Santander | Lager 157 Ski Team | Team Koteng |
| 2017 | VII | Team Santander | Lager 157 Ski Team | Team United Bakeries |
| 2016 | VI | Team Santander | Team United Bakeries | Team Exspirit |
| 2015 | V | Team Santander | Team United Bakeries | Team Coop |
| 2014 | IV | Team United Bakeries | Team Centric | Team Coop |
| 2013 | III | Team Xtra Personell | Team Coop | Team United Bakeries |
| 2012 | II | Team Xtra Personell | Team Exspirit | Team United Bakeries |
| 2011 | I | Team Xtra Personell | Team Exspirit | Team United Bakeries |

== Ski Classics Legends ==
Atleter som vunnit minst fem enskilda Pro Tour Event klassas som Ski Classics Legends of the sport.

| Vinster | Födelseår | Legend |
| 21 | 1983 | Britta Johansson Norgren Lager 157 Ski Team |
| 16 | 1972 | Anders Aukland Team Ragde Charge |
| 15 | 1982 | Seraina Boner Team Exspirit |
| 14 | 1973 | Stanislav Řezáč Patria Direct Team |
| 13 | 1985 | Petter Eliassen Team Ragde Eiendom |
| 12 | 1990 | Andreas Nygaard Team Ragde Charge |
| 11 | 1983 | Kateřina Smutná ED System Bauer Team |
| 10 | 1983 | Tord Asle Gjerdalen Team XPND |
| 10 | 1988 | Lina Korsgren Team Ramudden |
| 8 | 1975 | Jørgen Aukland Team Xtra Personell |
| 7 | 1976 | Oskar Svärd |
| 7 | 1980 | Jenny Grip |
| 6 | 1983 | Justyna Kowalczyk Team Santander |
| 6 | 1978 | Jerry Ahrlin Team Xtra Personell |
| 6 | 1995 | Emil Persson Lager 157 Ski Team |
| 5 | 1981 | John Kristian Dahl Team United Bakeries |
| 5 | 1981 | Sandra Hansson Team United Bakeries |
| 5 | 1976 | Daniel Tynell |
| 5 | 1988 | Astrid Øyre Slind Team Koteng |
