= Maid (title) =

Title granted to the eldest daughter of a Laird

Maid was a customary title in the Scottish Highlands for the heiress to a chiefship or chieftainship.

== Heiress to lairdship ==
It was also granted to the eldest daughter of a laird. The title is not often used today but can still be used. The title is customary and not automatically given.

The eldest daughter of a laird is entitled to place the title at the end of her name along with the lairdship therefore becoming "Miss [Firstname] [Lastname], Maid of [Lairdship]". Placing only the word "maid" at the end of the name is incorrect, as the lairdship must be included.

As the title is customary and not automatic, it means that the eldest daughter can choose if they wish to take on this title, if they choose not to they are simply addressed as "Miss [Firstname] [Lastname] of [Lairdship]".

If the eldest daughter is the heir apparent to a lairdship, she has the choice to either take on the title "younger" or to remain titled as "Maid of [x]". Once they take on the lairdship in their own right, they will then become styled as "lady" and the title of "Maid of [x]" will pass on to their eldest daughter.

The title "Maid of [x]" is held for life, unless the eldest daughter becomes a "lady" in her own right. No one else can be given this title during the lifetime of another maid. If a laird has a son who is the heir apparent but still has an elder daughter, she is still entitled to become styled as "maid".

=== Forms of address ===
If the eldest daughter of a laird chooses to accept the title it would be styled as "Miss [Forename] [Surname], Maid of [Lairdship]" (e.g. Miss Jane Smith, Maid of Edinburgh). If the eldest daughter should marry, she will still hold the title.

If a laird has any younger daughters, they are styled as "Miss [Forename] [Surname] of [Lairdship]"

== See also ==
- Princess Royal
- Forms of address in the United Kingdom
- Courtesy titles in the United Kingdom
- Lord
- Lady
- The Honourable
