= Team Xtra Personell =

Team Centric
- Sport: Skiing
- Founded: 2007
- League: Ski Classics
- Region: Norway
- Team history: formerly Team Xtra Personell
- Managing director: Nils Marius Otterstad
- Main sponsor: Centric
- Website: teamcentric.org

Team Centric (formerly Team Xtra Personell) was the first professional private Cross-country skiing team in Norway. It was created in 2007. In the 2012–2013 season the team consisted of skiers Anders Aukland, Jørgen Aukland, Jerry Ahrlin, Simen Østensen and Stanislav Řezáč. The team participates mainly in the international long distance cross country cup Ski Classics.

Team Xtra Personell won Ski Classics team overall competition in both 2011 and 2012. Anders Aukland won the men's overall cup in 2012. Simen Østensen competed in Tour de Ski in the 2012–2013 season.

Since autumn 2013 the team is named Team Centric due to the team's main sponsor Xtra Personell being merged with the company Centric.
