= Årefjällsloppet =

Cross-country skiing event in Sweden

- Status: active
- Genre: sporting event
- Date: March
- Frequency: annual
- Locations: Åre Mountains, Jämtland County
- Country: Sweden
- Inaugurated: 2013

Årefjällsloppet is a Swedish long-distance cross country race which in 2013 is the final of the long distance cup Ski Classics. The first edition was held on 23 March 2013, and was 75 km classic technique.

== Winners ==
Year	Men	Women
2013	(Norway) Anders Aukland/ (Norway) Jørgen Aukland	(Switzerland) Seraina Boner
2014	(Sweden) Daniel Richardsson	(Sweden) Charlotte Kalla
2015	(Norway) Petter Eliassen	(Switzerland) Seraina Boner
2016	(Norway) John Kristian Dahl	(Poland) Justyna Kowalczyk
