= Birkebeinerrennet =

Norwegian cross-country ski marathon

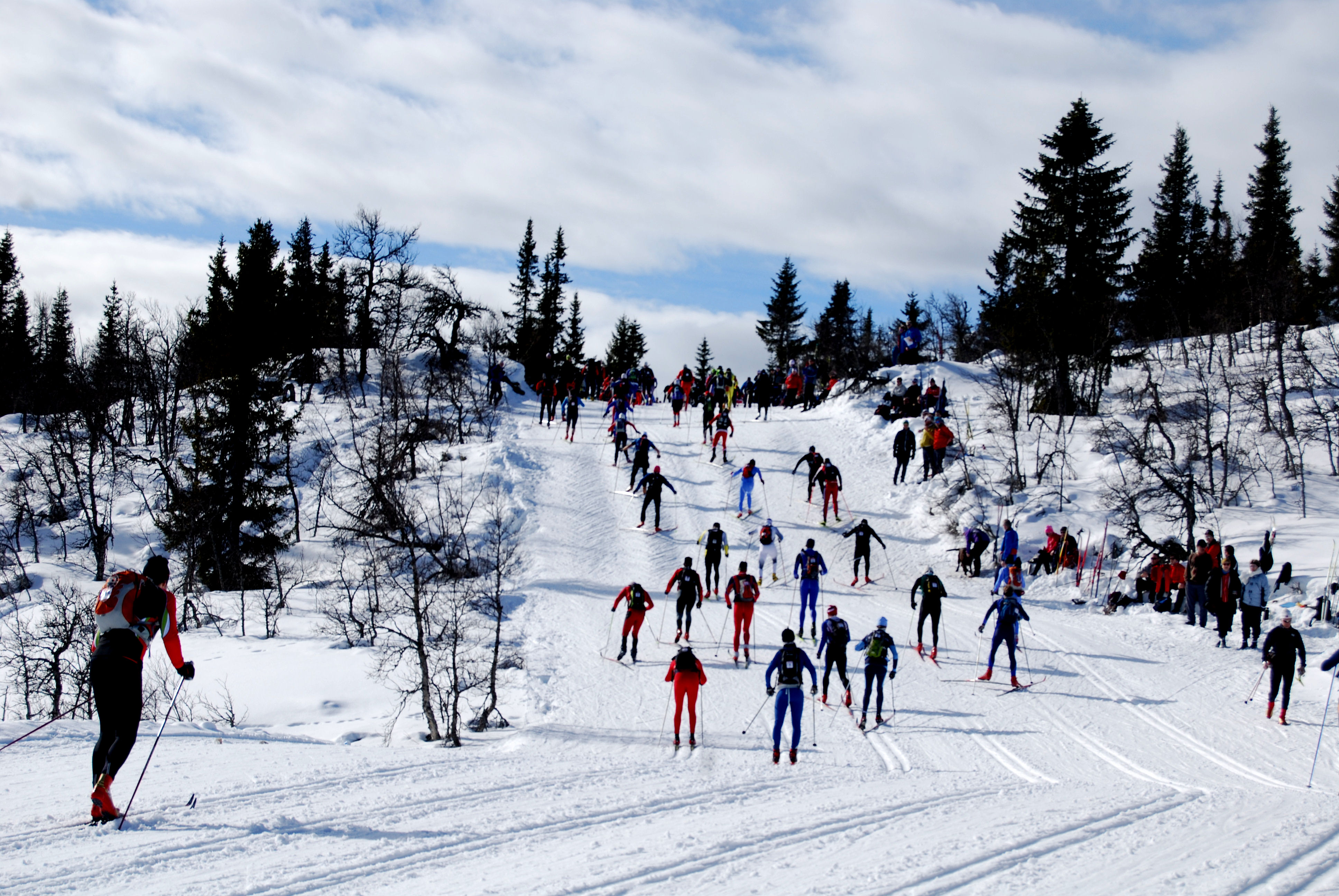
- Birkebeinerrennet 2010
- Status: active
- Genre: sporting event
- Date: Third Saturday in March
- Frequency: annual
- Location: Rena–Lillehammer
- Country: Norway
- Years active: 94
- Inaugurated: 1932 (men); 1976 (women)
- Major events: Cross-country skiing
- Sponsor: Sport1; Ssangyong; Swix

Birkebeinerrennet (lit. The Birkebeiner race) is a long-distance cross-country ski marathon held annually in Norway. It debuted in 1932 and has been a part of Worldloppet since Worldloppet's inception in 1979.

The Birkebeinerrennet is one of three races held under the Birkebeiner moniker, the other two being Birkebeinerrittet (bicycling) and Birkebeinerløpet (cross-country running).

The race was inspired by a notable journey made by the Birkebeiner loyalists Torstein Skevla and Skjervald Skrukka to save the infant heir to the Norwegian throne, Håkon Håkonsson, in the winter of 1206.

Researchers at the Manchester Metropolitan University found that the metabolic cost for modern ski models is about 2.5 J/kg*m as compared to about 5 J/kg*m for ski models dated 542 AD. They also estimated maximum cross country speed for the 542 AD ski to 5 m/s, compared to about 12 m/s for modern cross country skis; for long distance skiing (several hours) results were 3 and 7 m/s respectively. This corresponds to about 5 hours for the original 1206 AD Birkebeiner flight.

== Race ==
The race starts at Rena and ends at Lillehammer, a distance of 54 kilometres (34 mi). The number of participants has been steadily increasing each year, and for the 2011 race, the limit was set at 16,000.

The following aid stations are present:

- Skramstadsetra, 9 km
- Dambua, 15 km
- Kvarstad, 28 km
- Midtfjellet, 35 km
- Sjusjøen, 40 km

== History ==
=== Origin ===
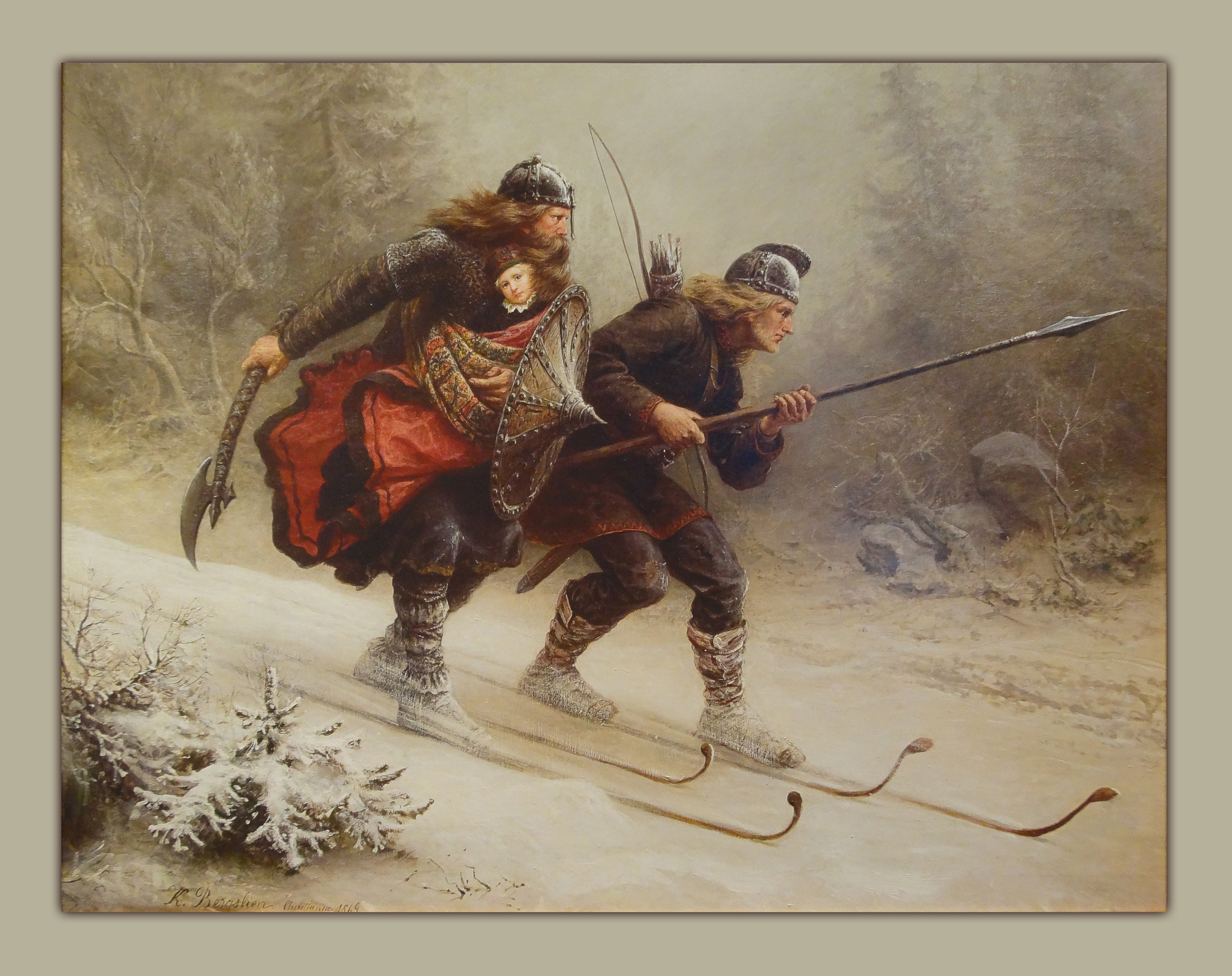
Skiing Birchlegs Crossing the Mountain with the Royal Child, painted by Knud Bergslien. Painting located at The Ski Museum. Holmenkollen, Oslo, Norway.

The Birkebeinerrennet has been held since 1932, and commemorates a trip made by the Birkebeiner loyalists Torstein Skevla and Skjervald Skrukka to save the infant heir to the Norwegian throne, Håkon Håkonsson, in 1206. All participants carry a backpack weighing at least 3.5 kg, symbolizing the weight of the then one-year-old king. The inaugural edition was won by Trygve Beisvåg. An own class for women was established in 1976. Until 1991, the start city was alternated between Lillehamer (finish at Rena) and Rena (finish at Lillehamer). The last time that Birkebeinerrenet started at Lillehammer, the start was located on the site where the Lysgårdsbakken ski jumping arena were built for the 1994 Winter Olympics.

=== Special 2002 FIS World Cup Race ===
In 2002, the race was included as the last event in the FIS World Cup. The World Cup class was won by Thomas Alsgaard and Anita Moen Guidon finishing in 2:24:08.7 and 2:43:39.1, respectively, faster than all records set prior to 2012 for men and prior to 2015 for women. However, the participants in the World Cup class were not required to carry the 3.5 kg backpack, and these times set in 2002 were therefore not considered as records.

=== Recent years ===
In 2007, the race was cancelled for the first time in history due to extremely high winds (90 km/h or 55 mph). However, at the time of cancellation, the event had been under way for nearly an hour, with roughly a quarter of the 13,000 competitors already on course. Despite the efforts of officials to send everyone back to the starting point, 55 competitors eventually reached the finish in Lillehammer, and upon being interviewed, blasted the decision to cancel the event .

The race was also cancelled in 2014, only 15 minutes before the start due to high winds of 15 m/s. Despite the cancellation, thousands of skiers completed the route from Rena to Lillehammer (and from Lillehammer to Rena) and criticized the decision. The organizers also decided not to give any refunds, which caused an investigation by the Norwegian Skiing Federation. In 2015, conditions were good for skiing fast and new records were set in both the men's and the women's classes. Petter Eliassen skied in 2 hours, 19 minutes and 28 seconds, more than two minutes faster than the previous record set by Anders Aukland in 2012. Therese Johaug skied the 2015 edition in 2 hours, 41 minutes and 46 seconds and set a new record for female skiers. The 2020 edition was cancelled due to the coronavirus pandemic.

== Past winners ==
Course record in bold.

=== Men ===
Year	Name	Club/Nation	Time
1932	Trygve Beisvåg	Norway	4:51.04
1933	Arne Rustadstuen	Norway	4:24.12
1934	Arne Rustadstuen (2)	Norway	5:41.25
1935	Olaf Hoffsbakken	Norway	4:10.35
1936	Oscar Gjøslien	Norway	5:16.05
1937	Gunnar Hansveen	Norway	4:44.45
1938	Olaf Hoffsbakken (2)	Norway	3:56.34
1939	Hallvard Eggset	Norway	4:09.05
1940	Gunnar Hansveen (2)	Norway	4:30.09
1946	Leif Haugen	Norway	3:54.59
1947	Gunnar Hermansen	Norway	4:38.24
1949	Olav Kveberg	Norway	4:13.55
1950	Gunnar Hermansen (2)	Norway	4:28.15
1951	Thorfinn Staff Eid	Norway	4:12.01
1952	Odd Nyborg	Norway	4:17.50
1953	Johs. Woxen	Norway	4:20.25
1954	Johan Østvang	Norway	4:30.18
1955	Oddmund Jensen	Norway	3:57.31
1956	Einar Skaaren	Norway	4:03.33
1957	Oddmund Jensen (2)	Norway	3:48.46
1958	Oddmund Jensen (3)	Norway	3:39.34
1959	Einar Skaaren (2)	Norway	4:01.33
1960	Martin Stokken	Norway	3:34.19
1961	Ole Ellefsæter	Norway	3:44.02
1962	Oddmund Jensen (4)	Norway	3:43.15
1963	Magnar Ingebrigtsli	Norway	4:04.59
1964	Egil Tvedt	Norway	3:23.31
1965	Oddmund Jensen (5)	Norway	3:41.48
1966	Egil Tvedt (2)	Norway	3:36.34
1967	Ivar Skogsrud	Norway	4:00.39
1968	Erik Solberg Johansen	Norway	4:16.50
1969	Niri Helleberg	Norway	3:20.51
1970	Arne Vehus	Norway	3:21.40
1971	Bjørn Arvnes	Norway	3:40.30
1972	Erik Solberg Johansen (2)	Norway	3:24.19
1973	Per Knotten	Norway	3:06.07
1974	Dag Anmarkrud	Norway	3:22.42
1975	Ivar Formo	Norway	3:25.35
1976	Audun Kolstad	Norway	3:12.10
1977	Audun Kolstad (2)	Norway	3:05.39
1978	Anders Bakken	Norway	3:14.04
1979	Anders Bakken (2)	Norway	3:14.35
1980	Dag Atle Bjørkheim	Norway	3:16.05
1981	Sven-Åke Lundbäck	Sweden	3:16.25
1982	Dag Atle Bjørkheim (2)	Norway	3:02.43
1983	Per Knut Aaland	Norway	2:51.25
1984	Magnar Rismyhr	Norway	2:59.28
1985	Ola Hassis	Sweden	2:53.11
1986	Örjan Blomquist	Sweden	3:08.30
1987	Pierre Harvey	Canada	3:08.30
1988	Jo Helgestad	Norway	3:08.08
1989	John Kvale	Norway	2:58.56
1990	Per Knut Aaland (2)	Norway	3:03.44
1991	Per Knut Aaland (3)	Norway	3:05.07
1992	Odd-Bjørn Hjelmeset	Norway	3:15.34
1993	Aleksandr Golubev	Russia	2:45.42
1994	Erling Jevne	Norway	2:36.10
1995	Odd-Bjørn Hjelmeset (2)	Norway	2:57.18
1996	Erling Jevne (2)	Norway	2:39.12
1997	Erling Jevne (3)	Norway	2:33.05
1998	Erling Jevne (4)	Norway	2:43.19
1999	Erling Jevne (5)	Øyer-Tretten IF, Norway	2:50.45
2000	Erling Jevne (6)	Øyer-Tretten IF, Norway	2:41.53
2001	Erling Jevne (7)	Øyer-Tretten IF, Norway	2:38.45
2002	Stanislav Řezáč	Czech Republic	2:39.08
2003	Odd-Bjørn Hjelmeset (3)	Fjellhug/Vereide IL, Norway	2:39.56
2004	Gianantonio Zanetel	Italy	2:48.55
2005	Stanislav Řezáč (2)	Czech Republic	2:37.37
2006	Anders Aukland	Oseberg SL, Norway	2:52.13
2007	Cancelled		
2008	Stanislav Řezáč (3)	Czech Republic	2:24.33
2009	Jerry Ahrlin	Sweden	2:36.58
2010	Anders Aukland (2)	Oseberg SL, Norway	2:27.19
2011	Stanislav Řezáč (4)	Czech Republic	2:39.54
2012	Anders Aukland (3)	Norway	2:21.34
2013	Anders Aukland (4)	Norway	2:42.38
2014	Cancelled		
2015	Petter Eliassen	Team LeasePlan Go, Norway	**2:19.28**
2016	John Kristian Dahl	Team United Bakeries, Norway	2:27.34
2017	Martin Johnsrud Sundby	Team United Bakeries, Norway	2:20.52
2018	Andreas Nygaard	Team Santander, Norway	2:33.13
2019	Petter Eliassen (2)	Team BN Bank, Norway	2:23.47
2020	Cancelled due to the coronavirus pandemic		
2021	Cancelled due to the coronavirus pandemic		
2022	Andreas Nygaard (2)	Team Santander, Norway	
2023	Andreas Nygaard (3)	Team Santander, Norway	
2024	Andreas Nygaard (4)	Team Santander, Norway	
2025	Andreas Nygaard (5)	Team Santander, Norway	

=== Women ===
Year	Name	Club/Nation	Time
1976	Berit Mørdre Lammedal	Norway	3:54.44
1977	Valborg Østberg	Norway	3:31.04
1978	Birgit Øverby Tennøe	Norway	3:49.01
1979	Anna Bjørgan	Norway	4:07.48
1980	Anna Bjørgan (2)	Norway	3:47.15
1981	Vigdis Rønning	Norway	3:43.19
1982	Birgit Øverby Tennøe (2)	Norway	3:40.55
1983	Hilde Riis	Norway	3:26.47
1984	Gry Oftedal	Norway	3:27.00
1985	Gry Oftedal (2)	Norway	3:25.45
1986	Ellen Grepperud	Norway	3:52.45
1987	Astrid Dæhlie	Norway	3:47.32
1988	Elisabeth Tharaldsen	Norway	3:50.13
1989	Marthe Flugstad	Norway	3:13.35
1990	Mona Fugli	Norway	3:51.50
1991	Ragnhild Bratberg	Norway	3:38.54
1992	Anne Jahren	Norway	3:52.00
1993	Astrid Kristin Ruud	NTHI, Norway	3:24.25
1994	Marit Elveos	Norway	3:21.12
1995	Unni Ødegård	Norway	3:28.15
1996	Marit Mikkelsplass	Norway	3:05.12
1997	Marthe Flugstad (2)	Norway	3:10.46
1998	Anita Moen Guidon	Trysilfjellet SK, Norway	3:03.21
1999	Anita Moen Guidon (2)	Trysilfjellet SK, Norway	3:21.22
2000	Anita Moen Guidon (3)	Trysilfjellet SK, Norway	3:06.24
2001	Anita Moen Guidon (4)	Trysilfjellet SK, Norway	3:03.27
2002	Marthe Flugstad (3)	Gjøvik SK, Norway	3:08.27
2003	Annmari Viljanmaa	Finland	3:05.16
2004	Annmari Viljanmaa (2)	Finland	3:03.47
2005	Cristina Paluselli	Italy	3:10.59
2006	Hilde Gjermundshaug Pedersen	Nybygda IL, Norway	3:08.10
2007	Cancelled		
2008	Hilde Gjermundshaug Pedersen (2)	Nybygda IL, Norway	2:52.04
2009	Hilde Gjermundshaug Pedersen (3)	Nybygda IL, Norway	3:05.00
2010	Jenny Hansson	Sweden	2:57.33
2011	Seraina Boner	Switzerland	3:11.17
2012	Seraina Boner (2)	Switzerland	2:47.03
2013	Seraina Boner (3)	Switzerland	3:09.12
2014	Cancelled		
2015	Therese Johaug	Norway	**2.41.46**
2016	Seraina Boner (4)	Switzerland	2:55.04
2017	Justyna Kowalczyk	Team Santander, Poland	2:46.40
2018	Justyna Kowalczyk (2)	Team Santander, Poland	3:06.10
2019	Justyna Kowalczyk (3)	Team Trentino Robinson Trainer, Poland	2:51.31
2020	Cancelled due to the coronavirus pandemic		
2021	Cancelled due to the coronavirus pandemic		
2022	Astrid Øyre Slind	Norway	
2023	Astrid Øyre Slind (2)	Norway	
2024	Magni Smedås	Norway	
2025	Stina Nilsson	Sweden	

== Birken Ski Festival ==
In the week preceding Birkebeinerrennet, several cross-country skiing races are held during the Birken Ski Festival:

- Inga-låmi (ladies – 5–30 km (3.1–18.6 mi))
- HalvBirken (half – 28 km (17 mi))
- BarneBirken (kids)
- UngdomsBirken (9–16 years old – 15 km (9.3 mi))
- StafettBirken (relay – 50 km (31 mi))
- FredagsBirken (Friday, original race – 54 km (34 mi))
- Birkebeinerrennet (original – 54 km (34 mi))
