= Bucklebury Farm Park =

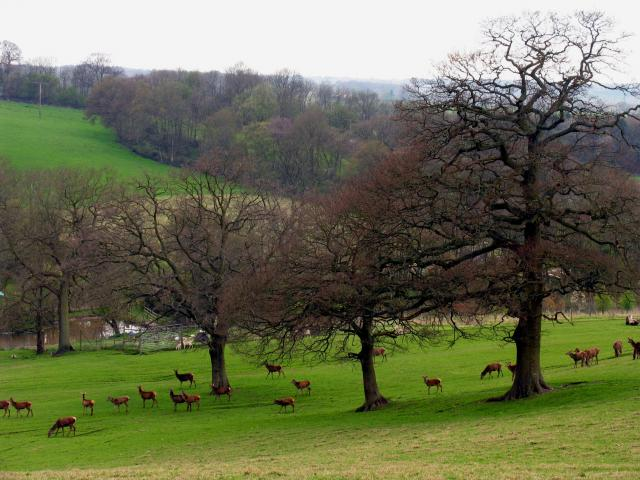
- Deer in Bucklebury Farm Park
- Interactive map of Bucklebury Farm Park
- 51°25′49.33″N 1°12′10.23″W
- Date opened: 1992
- Location: Bucklebury, Berkshire, England
- Land area: 74 acres (30 ha)
- Major exhibits: Deer Park, Farm Animals
- Website: buckleburyfarm.co.uk

Bucklebury Farm Park is an animal park located in Bucklebury in Berkshire, England. The Farm Park consists of mostly animals, Play equipment, Deer and Woody's Cafe which opened in 2013. Bucklebury Farm Park also houses a revolutionary Jumping Pillow which is one of only few in the UK. In March 2021 the park was bought for around £1.3 million by James Matthews and Pippa Middleton, who were joint owners with James Murray. The property reached a total debt of £807,543 in 2025 and the plans by Matthews and Middleton to build a nursery on the site for children were refused by the local highways authority. In 2026, it was reported that the couple was selling the property.
