= Younger (title) =

Scottish convention for titles

Younger is a Scottish convention, style of address, or description traditionally used by the heir apparent to a laird, someone whose name includes a territorial designation (e.g. armigerous families who are no longer lairds), a chieftainship (the head of a cadet branch of a clan which has a chief), a clan chief, or a Scottish Baron.

The style of using the term "Younger" applies equally to a woman who is heir in her own right as to a man. The style of "Younger" is neither a title of nobility nor a peerage. The abbreviation of Younger is Yr. When a person bearing this suffix becomes the laird or Baron in their own right, or succeeds to the arms of a now landless family, or inherits the chieftainship of a cadet branch or a clan chiefship, they drop the suffix and the next heir apparent may add the style to their name.

== Forms of address ==
- The written style of address of the heir to a baron is (for example) "John Smith of Edinburgh, Younger", abbreviated "John Smith of Edinburgh, Yr.", or "John Smith Yr. of Edinburgh".
- The wife of the heir may adopt the same style as her husband and would be addressed in writing as Mrs. John Smith of Edinburgh, Younger (she might use her own forename but this might imply that she was divorced).
- An heir can also be referred to and addressed as "The Younger (of) [x]", for example "The Younger (of) Edinburgh".
- Other younger sons would not have the territorial surname unless they was the nominated heir presumptive.

== See also ==
- Laird
- Maid (title)
- Prince of Wales
- Forms of address in the United Kingdom
- Courtesy titles in the United Kingdom
- Lord
- Lady
- The Honourable
