= Stanislav Řezáč =

Czech cross-country skier

Personal information
- Nationality: Czech Republic
- Born: 29 April 1973 (age 53) Jablonec nad Nisou, Czech SR, Czechoslovakia

Sport
- Sport: Skiing

Stanislav Řezáč (born 29 April 1973) is a Czech long-distance cross-country skier competing in the Worldloppet Ski Federation series of races.

Řezáč won the prestigious Birkebeinerrennet race in Norway for four times - in 2002, 2005, 2008 and 2011. He also finished second-placed in the Vasaloppet race in Sweden in 2011. In 2009 he finished third in the same race.

== Media ==
In 2011 a video of Řezáč giving an interview after the Birkebeinerrennet race became viral in the Czech Republic. Řezáč was struggling to speak English, mixing it with German and Czech. During the interview, Řezáč mentions the word "šůšn" several times. Journalists initially thought it was a mispronunciation of an English word; it was later revealed to be a reference to the Norwegian village of Sjusjøen.

== Achievements ==
- 2000 Jizerská padesátka, Bedřichov, 50 km, Czech Republic, 1. place
- 2001 Jizerská padesátka, Bedřichov, 50 km, Czech Republic, 1. place
- 2002 Kangaroo Hoppet, Falls Creek, Victoria (Australia), 1. place
- 2003 Jizerská padesátka, Bedřichov, 50 km, Czech Republic, 2. place
- 2003 Vasaloppet, Sweden, 3. place
- 2003 FIS Marathon Cup, 2. place
- 2004 König Ludwig Lauf (Germany), 50 km classic, 1. place
- 2004 Gatineau Loppet (Canada), 50 km classic, 1. place
- 2004 American Birkebeiner (USA), 50 km classic, 2. place
- 2004 FIS Marathon Cup, 3. place
- 2006 König Ludwig Lauf (Germany), 50 km classic, 1. place
- 2006 Vasaloppet, Sweden, 4. place
- 2009 Vasaloppet, Sweden, 3. place
- 2010 Vasaloppet, Sweden, 3. place
- 2011 Vasaloppet, Sweden, 2. place
- 2011 Birkebeinerrennet, Norway, 1. place
- 2011 World Classics Champion, 1. place
- 2012 Jizerská padesátka, Bedřichov, 50 km, Czech Republic, 1. place
- 2012 Marcialonga di Fiemme e Fassa 2012, 70 km classic, Italy, 3. place
- 2012 Koenig Ludwig Lauf, 50 km, 1. place
- 2012 Vasaloppet, Sweden, 3. place
