= Unni Ødegård =

Norwegian cross-country skier

Unni Ødegård (born 25 September 1974) is a retired Norwegian cross-country skier.

She competed at the 1993 and 1994 Junior World Championships, managing two 5th-place finishes.

She made her World Cup debut in February 1995 at the Holmenkollen ski festival, finishing 42nd in the 30 km. She collected her first World Cup points at the 1996 edition of the same race, finishing 21st, and improved to 15th in the 2004 Val di Fiemme 70 km. Her last World Cup outing was a 27th place in March 2004 in Pragelato.

She represented the sports club Molde og Omegn IF.
