= Oddmund Jensen =

Norwegian cross-country skier and coach

Personal information
- Full name: Oddmund Ingvald Jensen
- Born: 26 September 1928 Sørfold Municipality, Norway
- Died: 6 March 2011 (aged 82) Lillehammer Municipality, Norway

Sport
- Country: Norway
- Sport: Cross-country skiing
- Club: Alvdal IL; Lillehammer SK

Oddmund Ingvald Jensen (26 September 1928 – 6 March 2011) was a Norwegian cross-country skier and coach.

He was born in Sørfold Municipality, but represented Alvdal IL. He participated at the 1956 Winter Olympics in Cortina d'Ampezzo, in 30 and 50 km, and at the 1960 Winter Olympics in Squaw Valley. He was Norwegian champion in 50 km in 1959.

He was head coach for the Norwegian men's cross country national team from 1964 to 1978. He was responsible for the ski tracks at the 1994 Winter Olympics at Lillehammer.

Jensen died on 6 March 2011 at the age of 82.

== Cross-country skiing results ==
=== Olympic Games ===
Year	Age	15 km	30 km	50 km	4 × 10 km relay
1956	27	—	17	14	—
1960	31	—	10	11	—

=== World Championships ===
Year	Age	15 km	30 km	50 km	4 × 10 km relay
1958	29	24	22	—	4
1962	33	—	—	15	—
