= König Ludwig Lauf =

Ski race in Germany

Start König Ludwig Lauf
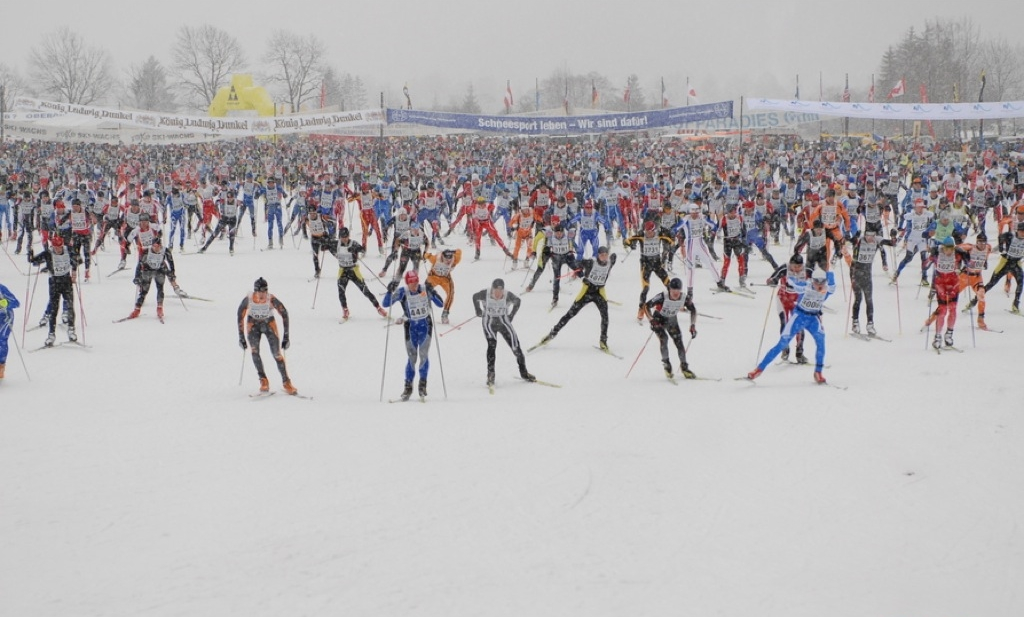
- Start König Ludwig Lauf
- Status: active
- Genre: sporting event
- Date: February
- Frequency: annual
- Location: Bavaria
- Country: Germany
- Inaugurated: 1968 (men); 1980 (women)

König Ludwig Lauf is a long distance cross-country skiing race, that takes places in Germany, and is part of the international long distance cup Ski Classics and the Worldloppet series. The race is over distances of 50 km and 23 km in both classical and free technique.

It debuted in 1968 and has been a part of Worldloppet as long as Worldloppet has been around.
