= Courtesy titles in the United Kingdom =

Forms of address for close relatives of peers

A courtesy title is a form of address and/or reference in the British system of nobility used for children, former wives and other close relatives of a peer, as well as certain officials such as some judges and members of the Scottish gentry. These styles are used "by courtesy" in the sense that persons referred to by these titles do not in law hold the substantive title. There are several different kinds of courtesy title in the British peerage system.

== Children of peers ==
=== Courtesy titles ===
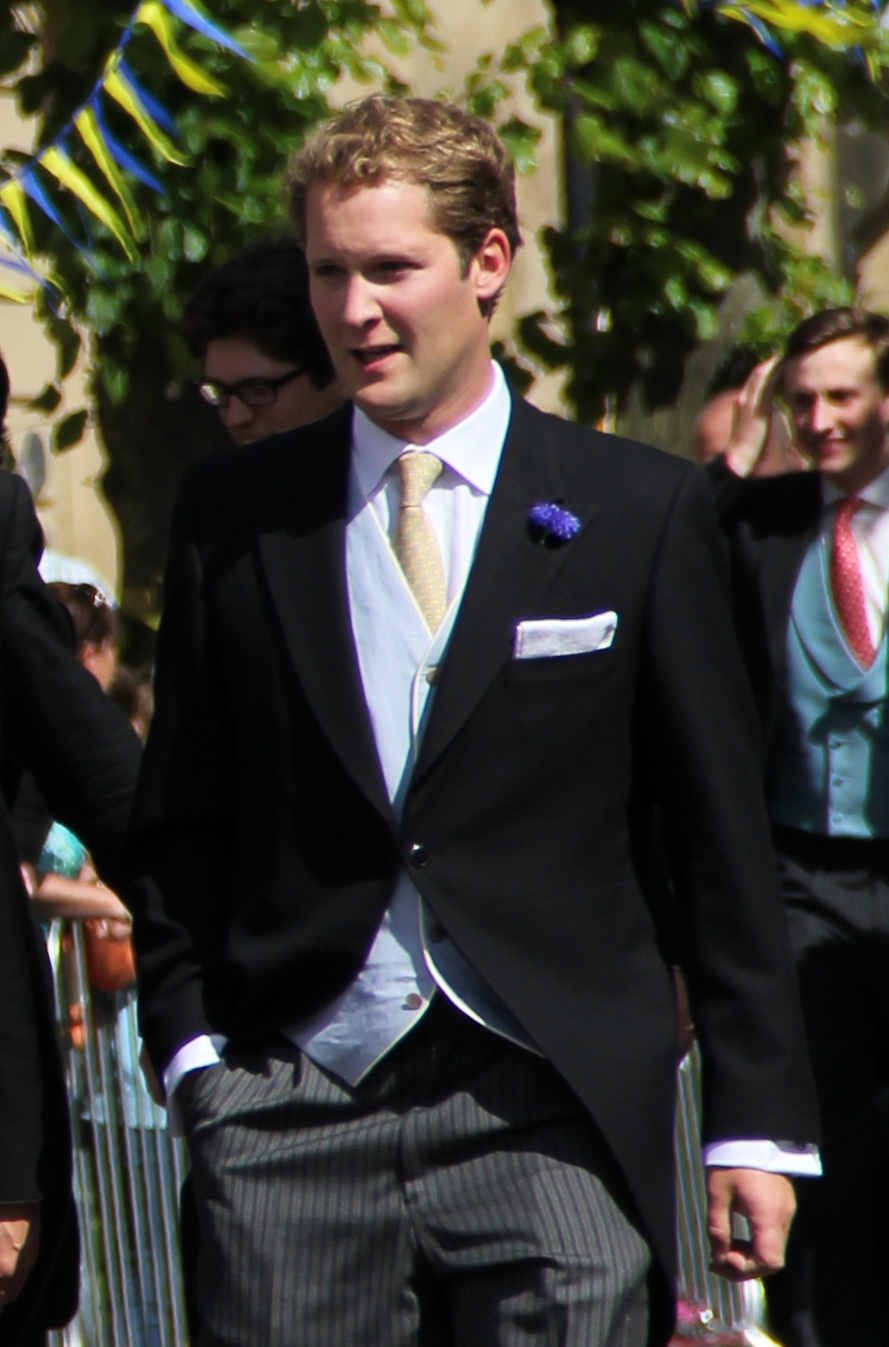
The son of the current Duke of Northumberland has the courtesy title of Earl Percy, and is addressed and referred to as "Lord Percy".

If a peer of one of the top three ranks of the peerage (a duke, a marquess or an earl) has more than one title, his eldest son – himself not a peer – may use one of his father's lesser titles "by courtesy". However, the father continues to be the substantive holder of the peerage title, and the son is using the title by courtesy only, unless issued a writ of acceleration. The eldest son of the eldest son of a duke or marquess may use a still lower title, if one exists. In legal documents, the courtesy title is implied, but not used directly – that is, the name of the person is given, followed by "commonly called [title]".

For example, the Duke of Norfolk is also Earl of Arundel and Baron Maltravers. His eldest son is, therefore, styled "Earl of Arundel" ("the" does not precede it, as this would indicate a substantive title). Lord Arundel's eldest son (should he have one during his father's lifetime) would be styled "Lord Maltravers". However, only the Duke of Norfolk is actually a peer; his son Lord Arundel and his hypothetical grandson Lord Maltravers are not.

Courtesy titles are used by the peer's eldest living son, and the eldest son's eldest living son, and so forth, only; other descendants are not permitted to use the peer's subsidiary titles. Only the heir apparent (and heir apparent to the heir apparent, and so on) may use them. An heir presumptive (for instance, a brother, nephew, or cousin) does not use a courtesy title. However, Scottish practice allows the style Master/Mistress of X to an heir presumptive as well as to an heir apparent; for example, the brother of the present Marquess of Tweeddale, Lord Alistair Hay, has the title Master of Tweeddale.

Holders of courtesy titles do not, at the Court of St James's, have their title preceded by "the": "Earl of Arundel" rather than "the Earl of Arundel", for instance.

Wives are entitled to use the feminine forms of their husbands' courtesy titles. Thus, the wife of an Earl of Arundel would be styled "Countess of Arundel" (again, without the definite article in front).

The children (either male or female) of holders of courtesy titles bear the styles as would be theirs if their fathers actually held the peerages by which they were known; for example, Serena Stanhope, daughter of Viscount Petersham (heir to the Earl of Harrington), had the style of the Honourable, which is reserved for daughters of viscounts and barons, a title which her father held by courtesy only.

=== Choosing a courtesy peer's title ===
The actual courtesy title which is used is a matter of family tradition. For instance, the eldest son of the Duke of Buccleuch and Queensberry is styled "Earl of Dalkeith", even though the duke is also Marquess of Dumfriesshire, a title that outranks the earldom. Similarly, the eldest son of the Marquess of Londonderry is styled "Viscount Castlereagh", even though the marquess is also Earl Vane.

In a few houses, successive heirs alternate between two courtesy titles. Heirs to the Marquess of Lansdowne are alternately "Earl of Kerry" and "Earl of Shelburne", whereas heirs to the Earl of Jersey are alternately "Viscount Grandison" and "Viscount Villiers".

Titles with the same name as a peer's main title are not used as courtesy titles. For instance, the Duke of Westminster is also Marquess of Westminster and Earl Grosvenor (among other titles). The duke's heir apparent (when there is one) is not styled "Marquess of Westminster", as this would cause confusion between son and father, and so the former is styled "Earl Grosvenor" instead.

The title used does not have to be exactly equivalent to the actual peerage. For example, the eldest son of the Duke of Wellington is usually styled "Marquess of Douro", although the actual peerage possessed by his father is Marquess Douro (no "of" between the rank and place).

If a peer of the rank of earl or above does not have any subsidiary titles of a name different from his main title, his eldest son usually uses an invented courtesy title of "Lord [surname]". For instance, the eldest son of the Earl of Devon is styled "Lord Courtenay", even though the earl has no barony of that name; similarly, the eldest son of the Earl of Guilford is styled "Lord North". The eldest son of the Earl of Huntingdon, who has no subsidiary titles, is styled "Viscount Hastings" to avoid confusion with Lord Hastings, a substantive peer. The heir of Earl Castle Stewart uses the style "Viscount Stewart" to avoid confusion with Lord Stewart, the eldest son of Viscount Castlereagh (the eldest son of the Marquess of Londonderry).

=== Courtesy style of "Lord" ===
The courtesy style of "Lord" before the given name is accorded to younger sons of dukes and marquesses. It is always added before the person's given name and surname, as in the example of Lord Randolph Churchill, although conversational usage drops the surname on secondary reference. It is never used before the person's surname alone, and is not considered a "title" under peerage law.

The title persists after the death of the holder's father, but is not inherited by any of his children. The wife of the holder is entitled to the feminine form of her husband's style, which takes the form of "Lady" followed by her husband's given name and surname, as in the example of Lady Randolph Churchill. The holder is addressed as "Lord Randolph" and his wife as "Lady Randolph".

=== Courtesy style of "Lady" ===
The courtesy style of "Lady" is used for the daughters of dukes, marquesses, and earls. It is added before the person's given name, as in the examples Lady Diana Spencer and Lady Henrietta Waldegrave. Because it is merely a courtesy with no legal implications, the honorific persists after the death of the holder's father, but it is not inherited by her children. The style is never used immediately before the surname alone.

"Lady" is also used before the first name of Ladies Companion of the Order of the Garter and Ladies of the Order of the Thistle who do not hold another, higher title or style.

"Lady" is also a courtesy title for wives of knights and baronets, preceding the family name but never before the first name. Wives of lairds are also accorded the courtesy, with the title preceding the name of the estate and not the individual, similar to wives of peers.

The spouse of a woman with a courtesy style does not hold any courtesy style in right of their spouse; neither does the husband of a person with any style or title (including the husband of a peer).

=== Courtesy style of "The Honourable" ===
Younger sons of earls, along with all sons and daughters of viscounts, barons and lords of parliament, are accorded the courtesy style of "the Honourable" before their name; one example is the Honourable Vita Sackville-West. This is usually abbreviated to "the Hon.". The style persists after the death of the holder's father, but it may not be inherited by the holder's children. It is used only in third person reference, not in speaking to the person.

=== Married daughters ===
A daughter of a duke, marquess or earl who marries an untitled man becomes "Lady [given name] [husband's surname]"; an example from fiction is Lady Catherine de Bourgh in Pride and Prejudice, who married the untitled knight (or baronet) Sir Lewis de Bourgh and, therefore, retains her courtesy style. The daughter of a viscount or baron who marries a commoner is styled "the Honourable [given name] [husband's surname]".

Any woman who marries a peer can use the feminine version of his peerage title. If a woman marries a younger son of a duke or marquess, she becomes "Lady [husband's full name]". If she marries a younger son of an earl, or any son of a viscount or a baron, she becomes "the Hon. Mrs [husband's full name]".

In cases of divorce, a woman may keep the same style as during marriage or she may choose to assume the style "Mrs [given name] [husband's surname]". Regardless of what she chooses, she loses all precedence acquired from marriage and, because of the former option, there can be multiple Ladies John Smith at any one time.

=== Adoption ===
Until 2004, children who had been adopted by peers had no right to any courtesy titles. Pursuant to a Royal Warrant dated 30 April 2004, these children are now automatically entitled to the same styles and courtesy titles as their siblings. However, unlike biological children, they cannot inherit peerages from their parent (and thus, since they cannot be heirs, if a peer adopts a son and he is the oldest son, he would use the styles of younger sons). For example, actress Nimmy March, the daughter of the Duke and Duchess of Richmond, was immediately elevated to Lady Naomi Gordon-Lennox on 30 April 2004.

Scottish peerages' rules for courtesy titles and styles differ.

=== Summary ===
Peer	Wife	Eldest son	Younger son	Unmarried daughter
Duke	Duchess	[father's subsidiary title]	Lord [first name] [last name]	Lady [first name] [last name]
Marquess	Marchioness	[father's subsidiary title]	Lord [first name] [last name]	Lady [first name] [last name]
Earl	Countess	[father's subsidiary title]	the Honourable [first name] [last name]	Lady [first name] [last name]
Viscount	Viscountess	the Honourable [first name] [last name]	the Honourable [first name] [last name]	the Honourable [first name] [last name]
Baron	Baroness	the Honourable [first name] [last name]	the Honourable [first name] [last name]	the Honourable [first name] [last name]

== Indirect inheritance ==
Occasionally, a person succeeds to a peerage upon the death of a relative who is not one of his or her parents. When this happens, the relatives of the new peer may be allowed to use the courtesy titles or styles which would have been accorded them if the new peer had succeeded a parent or grandparent in the title.

For instance, Rupert Ponsonby, 7th Baron de Mauley succeeded his childless uncle in 2002. His brother George had no title, as their father was only a younger son of a peer and never inherited (as heir presumptive) the Baron de Mauley title. However, in 2003, George was granted, by warrant of precedence from Queen Elizabeth II, the style and precedence that would have been his, had his father survived to inherit the barony, becoming the Honourable George Ponsonby. Precedence in such circumstances is usually granted, but is not automatic.

== Spouses of peers ==
The wife of a substantive peer is legally entitled to the privileges of peerage: she is said to have a "life estate" in her husband's dignity. Thus, a duke's wife is titled "the duchess", a marquess's wife "the marchioness", an earl's wife "the countess", a viscount's wife, "the viscountess" and a baron's wife "the baroness". Despite being referred to as a "peeress", she is a peer by virtue of her marriage; however, this is considered a legal title, as it grants her a legal (marriage) estate, unlike the social (courtesy) titles used by a peer's children.

The wives of eldest sons of peers hold their titles on the same basis as their husbands — that is, by courtesy. Thus, the wife of the person known as Marquess of Douro is known as "Marchioness of Douro".

=== Husbands ===
In the case of a woman who is a substantive peer in her own right, by succession or by first creation (that is, ennoblement, most commonly in recent times under the Life Peerages Act 1958), her husband acquires no distinction in right of his wife. Thus, the husband of Baroness Bottomley of Nettlestone has no courtesy title; he was simply called "Mr Peter Bottomley" until he was knighted and became "Sir Peter Bottomley".

In 2012, Conservative MP Oliver Colvile put forward a Ten Minute Rule bill to allow the spouse of a woman who holds an honour, if he or she enters civil partnership or marriage, to assume the style the Honourable. This bill stalled, and was not passed by the end of the Parliament. In 2013, there was a private member's bill in the House of Lords introduced by Conservative excepted hereditary peer Lord Lucas to the same effect, which was similarly not passed.

=== Widows ===
If a prince or peer dies, his wife's style does not change unless the new peer is a married man (or a woman, if the succession permits). Traditionally, the widowed peeress puts "Dowager" in her style – for example, "The Most Hon. the Marchioness of London" becomes "The Most Hon. the Dowager Marchioness of London".

If a widowed peeress's son predeceases her, her daughter-in-law does not use the title of Dowager, but is styled, for instance, "The Most Hon. Mary, Marchioness of London" until her mother-in-law dies, at which point she may use the title of "Dowager Marchioness". In more recent times, some widows have chosen to be styled with their first names, instead of as Dowager – for example, "Octavia, Lady Baden-Powell" ("Lady Octavia Baden-Powell" would incorrectly imply that she was a daughter of a duke, a marquess or an earl, or a Lady Companion of the Order of the Garter or a Lady of the Order of the Thistle without a higher style).

=== Divorced wives and widows who remarry ===
It used to be customary for women with higher titles from one marriage to retain them even on subsequent remarriage. As Lord Macnaughten put it, in the case of Earl Cowley v Countess Cowley [1901] AC 450: "... everybody knows that it is a very common practice for peeresses (not being peeresses in their own right) after marrying commoners to retain the title lost by such marriage. It is not a matter of right. It is merely a matter of courtesy, and allowed by the usages of society." The divorce court, in the above case, granted the earl an injunction preventing his former wife from using his title; however, this was overturned by the Court of Appeal, and this was confirmed by the House of Lords, on the grounds that ordinary courts of law lacked jurisdiction in matters of honour.

The same practice was, historically, followed by widows who remarried. A prominent example was Catherine Parr, the last wife of Henry VIII, who continued to be known as Queen Catherine even after her marriage to Thomas, Baron Seymour of Sudeley (and, indeed, she disputed precedence with Anne Seymour, Duchess of Somerset on this basis). This usage died out later in the twentieth century, and women who remarry now ordinarily take a new married name and do not retain their former title.

The College of Arms, acting on an opinion of the Lord Chancellor, holds that divorced peeresses "cannot claim the privileges or status of Peeresses which they derived from their husbands". While a divorced former wife of a peer is no longer a peeress, she may still use the title, styled with her forename prefixed to the title (without the definite article). Her forename is used primarily to differentiate her from any new wife of her former husband; however, should the former husband remain unmarried, then the former wife may continue to use the title without her forename attached. Should a former wife of a peer remarry, then she would lose the style of a divorced peeress and take on a style relating to her new husband.

On 21 August 1996, letters patent changed titles of divorced wives of British princes, depriving their former wives of the style of Royal Highness. For this reason Her Royal Highness the Princess of Wales after divorce became Diana, Princess of Wales. The same happened to Her Royal Highness the Duchess of York, who became Sarah, Duchess of York.

=== Civil partners ===
Civil partners of someone using a courtesy title are not entitled to use their partner's title.

== Scottish courtesy titles ==
Laird is a courtesy title for the owners of some long-established Scottish estates; the title is attached to the estate, not to the family of the owner. Traditionally, a laird is formally styled in the manner evident on the 1730 tombstone in a Scottish kirkyard (churchyard). It reads: "The Much Honoured John Grant Laird of Glenmoriston". The section titled Scottish Feudal Baronies in Debrett's states that the use of the prefix "The Much Hon." is correct, but that "most lairds prefer the unadorned name and territorial designation". The wife of a laird is traditionally accorded the courtesy title of Lady.

=== Courtesy suffix of "Younger" ===
A form of courtesy title granted is the suffix of "the Younger" (also written as Yr or yr) at the end of the name. This title is granted to the heir apparent of a Scottish baron and is placed at the end of his or her name (for example, John Smith of Edinburgh, Younger, or John Smith, Younger of Edinburgh). The wife of a Younger may herself place the title at the end of her name. The holder is addressed as the younger (for example, The Younger of Edinburgh).

=== Courtesy prefix of "Maid" ===
The courtesy prefix of "Maid" is granted to the eldest daughter of a Scottish baron. If the eldest daughter is also the heir presumptive she may either hold the title "Younger" or the title "Maid". The title is customary and not automatically given. The title is placed at the end of the name (for example, Miss Alice Joy, Maid of Newcastle). The holder is addressed as "The Maid of [Barony]".

== Precedence status of courtesy titles ==
The courtesy titles and styles of children of peers are social, not legal. For this reason, in official documents, Lord John Smith is often referred to as John Smith, Esq., commonly called Lord John Smith; the Hon. Mrs Smith would be called Mary Jane, Mrs Smith, commonly called the Hon. Mary Jane Smith. Only peers in attendance at Parliament enjoy statutory precedence. There is, however, official precedence accorded at the Court of St James's that results from being the wife or child of a peer, and to which social styles are attached. The wives of peers, however, are peeresses and legally enjoy their titles in exactly the same manner as peeresses in their own right.

Children of peers can outrank certain actual peers. For instance, the daughter of a duke outranks a countess. However, if the daughter of a duke marries an earl, she drops to the rank of countess, because her courtesy title is subsumed in his substantive title; however, if that same daughter marries a commoner, she retains her rank. If that daughter marries the eldest son of an earl, though he may be a courtesy peer, she may keep her rank until the son inherits the earldom, when she must drop to the rank of countess.

== Judicial courtesy titles ==
=== College of Justice in Scotland ===
In Scotland, Senators of the College of Justice (the judges of the Court of Session and the High Court of Justiciary as well as the Chairman of the Scottish Land Court) traditionally use the title Lord or Lady along with a surname or a territorial name. All Senators of the College have the honorific the Honourable before their titles, while those who are also Privy Counsellors or peers have the honorific the Right Honourable. Senators are made Privy Counsellors upon promotion to the Inner House.

For example, Alexander Wylie is known as the Honourable Lord Kinclaven, while Ronald Mackay is known as the Right Honourable Lord Eassie. Some Senators also hold peerage titles, such as the Right Honourable the Lady Clark of Calton, and these would be used in place of judicial titles.

=== Supreme Court of the United Kingdom ===
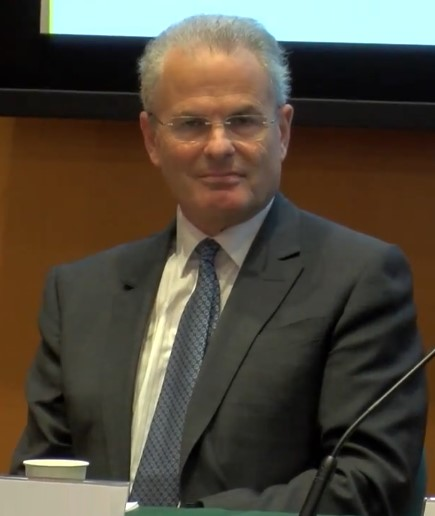
John Dyson, first Justice of the Supreme Court with the judicial courtesy title of Lord

On creation of the Supreme Court of the United Kingdom on 1 October 2009, the first Justices already held life peerages as Lords of Appeal in Ordinary, and continued to hold them. The government announced that future appointees would not be created peers. The first non-peer appointed to the Supreme Court was Sir John Dyson, who took office on 19 April 2010.

By royal warrant dated 10 December 2010, all Justices of the Supreme Court who are not already peers are granted the style Lord or Lady followed by a surname, territorial designation or a combination of both, for life. This decision avoided any distinction from the Scottish Senators of the College of Justice (see section above). Accordingly, Sir John Dyson is styled Lord Dyson. Wives of male Supreme Court justices are styled as if they were wives of peers.

Nicholas Wilson, Lord Wilson of Culworth, appointed to the Supreme Court on 26 May 2011, was the first person to use a territorial name with his judicial courtesy title, adopting reference to Culworth in Northamptonshire.

== Professional courtesy titles ==
The title of "Doctor" (or the abbreviation "Dr") is used as a courtesy title in a number of fields by professionals who do not hold doctoral degrees. It is commonly used in this manner by physicians and dentists, although not surgeons. The Royal College of Veterinary Surgeons also allows the use of "Doctor" as a courtesy title by its members, though they must make clear in writing that they are vets and not physicians of human medicine or holders of academic doctorates to ensure the public are not misled.

The title of Captain is used as a courtesy title by shipmasters in the merchant navy who do not hold the military rank of captain. It is also used in oral address for naval officers below the rank of captain who are in command of a ship.

== See also ==
- List of courtesy titles in the peerages of Britain and Ireland
- Forms of address in the United Kingdom

== Bibliography ==
- Montague-Smith, P. (editor). (1979). Debrett's Peerage and Baronetage. ISBN 978-0-905-64920-7.
