= Ötillö =

Swimrun competition

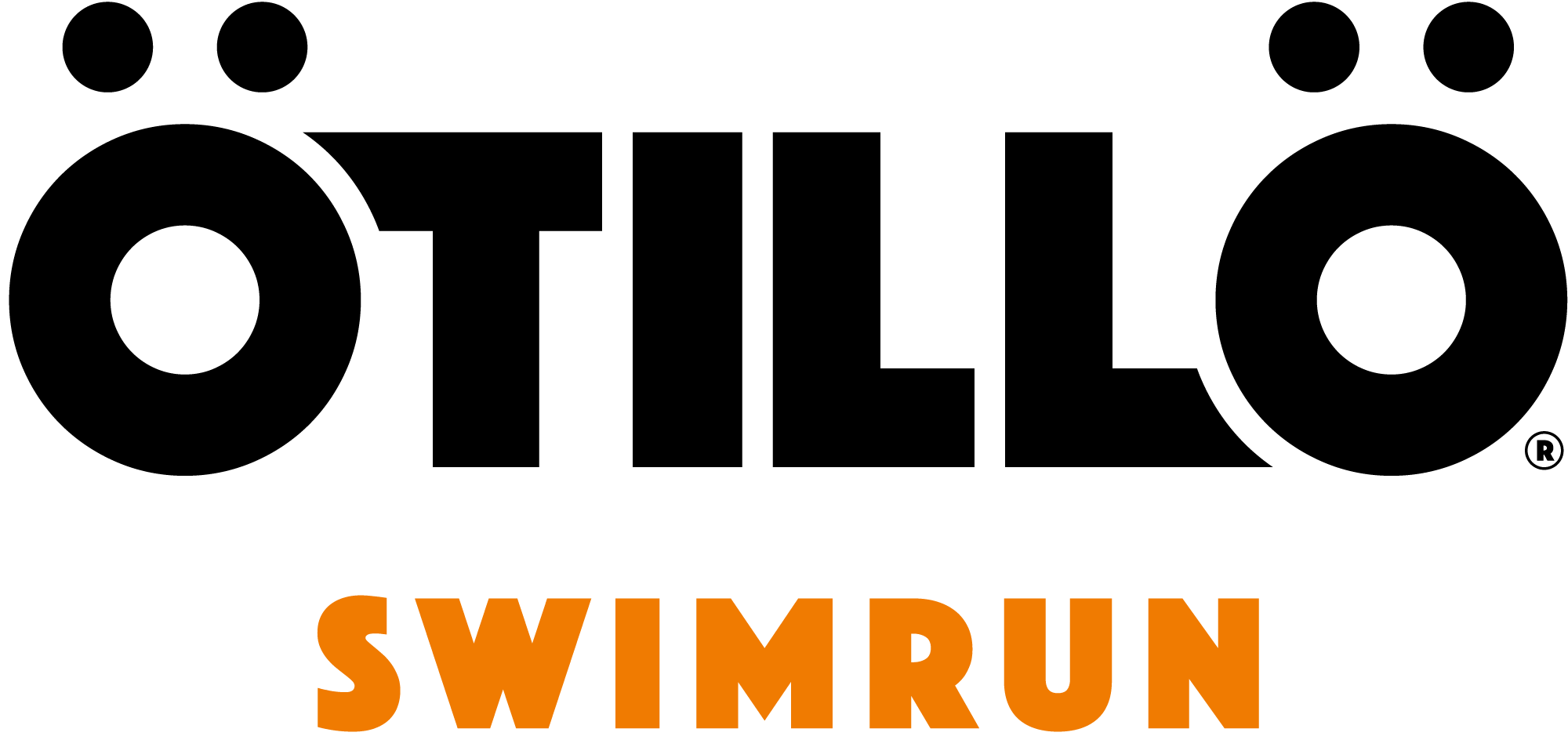
Logo

Ötillö is an ultra-endurance race held annually on the first Monday in September in the Stockholm archipelago, Sweden. 160 women's, men's and mixed teams complete a 70 km racecourse, consisting of a 60 km trail running and 10 km of open water swimming across 25 islands to crown the Ötillö Swimrun World Champions.

The essence of swimrun is racing in teams of two on a marked course in wild nature. The athletes alternate between trail running and open water swimming. To lose no time between these two disciplines, they run in their wetsuit and swim in their shoes.

== History ==
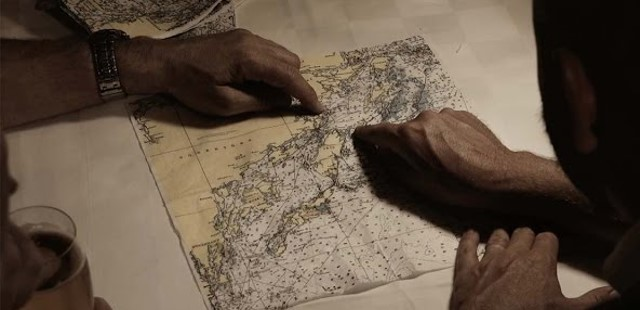
Napkin with a map of the Stockholm archipelago

In 2002 Anders Malm, one of the owners of Utö Värdshus (the finish line hotel of Ötillö, The Swimrun World Championship), his friend Janne Lindberg and some of his staff (the Andersson brothers) had a late night in the bar. Playing with a napkin with a map of the Stockholm archipelago, they challenged each other – "Last team of two to Sandhamn pays for hotel, dinner and drinks". Two teams of two started the next morning with the only rule being that they had to pass the three different restaurants on the islands between the start and the finish. The last team at the restaurant had to drink and pay what the team ahead of them had ordered for them. It took them more than 24 hours and they were too tired to party on arrival. We call them the Original 4.

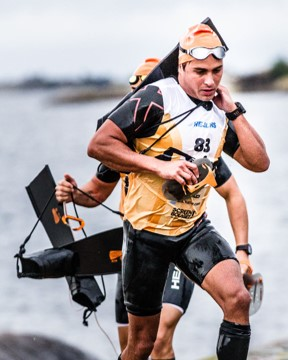
Athletes with swim fins

This was the first recorded Swimrun in history. In 2006, the Swedish adventure racer duo Michael Lemmel and Mats Skott turned this bet into a commercial race called Ötillö, which is Swedish and means island to island. The first couple of years only 11 teams started and only two managed to finish within the time limits. From 2007 onward, the Ötillö race underwent several changes. Participants experimented with equipment like surfboards, snorkels, fins on shoes, and creatively crafted rocket tow floats, adding a playful twist to the sport. These innovations exemplified the pioneering spirit of the athletes.

By 2009, Ötillö attracted 50–60 teams, marking a solid foundation for the growing sport. In 2011, swimrun got its name from Erika Rosenbaum, one of Ötillö, The Swimrun World Championship podium finishers. The Ötillö Swimrun Engadin race in 2014 was the first Ötillö race outside of Sweden. It launched the international swimrun movement. Nowadays, there are hundreds of swimrun races across Europe, America, Africa, Australia, and New Zealand. To further develop the sport, in 2023 Swimrun AG, owner of Ötillö, The Swimrun World Championship, and the Ötillö Swimrun World Series, acquired a majority stake in Swimrun USA Inc., a prominent organizer of Swimrun events in the United States, called Ödyssey. As part of the acquisition, all Ödyssey races will become part of the Ötillö Swimrun World Series by 2024.

== Today ==
From being a single endurance challenge in its early years, Ötillö has developed into a worldwide sport, the sport of swimrun. There are now more than 600 swimrun races around the world and an estimate of 50.000 active athletes involved in the swimrun movement. Today, Ötillö is internationally recognised as one of the toughest one-day races in the world. Every year, on the first Monday in September, 400 swimrunners start the Ötillö from Sandhamn to Utö.

=== Ötillö World Series ===
Due to the great interest, in 2015, the Ötillö Swimrun World Series was launched as a series of qualifier races for Ötillö, The Swimrun World Championship. The World Series consists of four events in Europe (Utö, Engadin, Gothenburg, Cannes) and five events in North America (Whistler, Casco Bay, Mackinac, Orcas Island and Austin). Swimrunner can collect Swimrun Ranking Points by finishing in the top 30 at the Ötillö Swimrun World Series races or selected Ötillö Merit Races. Based on the ranking results, the best swimrunners of the season can apply to take part in the Ötillö, The Swimrun World Championship.

=== Ötillö Race Distances ===
An Ötillö Swimrun weekend comprises three different race formats. Athletes can chose to race solo or in teams of two.

==== World Series ====
World Series races serve as qualifiers to Ötillö, The Swimrun World Championship. It is the longest and thoughest swimrun discipline. The race distance is around 40 km (33 km of trail running and 7 km of swimming).

==== Sprint ====
Sprint races are a shorter version of the World Series. They are designed to be fun and challenging with a distance of around 15 km (11 km of trail running and 4 km of swimming).

==== Experience ====
The Experience races are short and serve as an entry-level for swimrun beginners to get introduced to the sport. These races are about 8 km long (6.5 km of trail running and 1.5 km of swimming).

== Ötillö Course ==
The 70-kilometer ÖTILLO Swimrun World Championship course starts on the island of Sandhamn at Sandhamn Seglarhotell. On their way to the finish on Utö, the athletes will complete 24 trail running sections ranging from 0.2 to 17 kilometres and 23 swimming sections ranging from 50 to 1600 metres. They pass 24 islands, including Runmarö, Nämdö and Ornö.

=== Course record ===
The course record of 7:00:59 h was set in 2022 by the team ARK Swimrun Hugo & Max with Hugo Tormento (FRA) and Max Andersson (SWE).

== Ötillö Events ==
Event	Location	Country	Edition	
Event	Location	Country	First	Next
Ötillö Swimrun Utö	Utö, Sweden	Sweden	2013	8 June 2024
Ötillö Swimrun Engadin	Engadin	Switzerland	2014	29 June 2024
Ötillö Swimrun Whistler	Whistler (British Columbia)	Canada	2024	7 July 2024
Ötillö Swimrun Gothenburg	Gothenburg	Sweden	2021	3 August 2024
Ötillö Swimrun Casco Bay	Casco Bay	United States	2016	11 August 2024
Ötillö Swimrun Mackinac	Mackinac Island	United States	2021	25 August 2024
Ötillö Swimrun Final 15K	Utö, Sweden	Sweden	2016	31 August 2024
Ötillö, The Swimrun World Championship	Stockholm Archipelago	Sweden	2006	7 September 2026
Ötillö Swimrun Orcas Island	Orcas Island	United States	2018	15 September 2024
Ötillö Swimrun Cannes	Cannes	France	2018	12 October 2024
Ötillö Swimrun Austin	Austin (Texas)	United States	2020	3 November 2024

== Ötillö Swimrun World Champions ==
Winner-Teams of Ötillö
Year	Mixed	Women	Men
2026	Sweden Anna Hellström; France Alexis Charrier; 7:58:09 h	France Johanne Laizeau; France Mélisande Muller; 9:06:47 h	New Caledonia Hugo Tormento; Australia Adriel Young; 7:18:32 h
2025	Sweden Hanna Skårbratt; Sweden Johan Skårbratt; 8:03:39 h	Switzerland Sabina Rapelli; Sweden Anna Hellström; 8:24:01 h (Course Record)	France Arnaud De Lustrac; France Jérome Gueguen; 7:13:05 h
2024	Sweden Lorraine Axegård; Sweden Fredrik Axegård; 08:31:04 h	Switzerland Sabina Rapelli; Sweden Desirée Andersson; 8:47:00 h	France Alexis Charrier; France Matthieu Poullain; 7:56:03 h
2023	Sweden Amanda Nilsson; Australia Adriel Young; 7:57:53 h	Sweden Anna Hellström; Sweden Desirée Andersson; 8:39:13 h	Sweden Max Andersson; France Hugo Tormento; 7:32:13 h
2022	Sweden Desirée Andersson; Sweden Alexander Berggren; 7:49:54 h (Course Record)	Sweden Helena Sivertsson; Sweden Ulrika Eriksson	Sweden Max Andersson; France Hugo Tormento; 7:00:59 h (Course Record)
2021	Sweden Desirée Andersson; Sweden Victor Dahl; 8:14:57 h	Sweden Helena Sivertsson; Sweden Kirstin Larsson; 9:00:47 h	Sweden Oscar Olsson; Australia Adriel Young; 7:38:43 h
2019	Sweden Charlotte Eriksson; Sweden Simon Börjeson; 8:38:10 h	Sweden Fanny Danckwardt; Sweden Desirée Andersson; 9:05:29 h	Sweden Pontus Lindberg; Sweden George Bjälkemo; 7:47:48 h
2018	Czech Republic Helena Karásková; Finland Martin Flinta; 8:16:15 h	Sweden Kristin Larsson; Sweden Annika Ericsson; 8:56:26 h	Finland Fredrik Axegård; Finland Alex Flores; 7:39:25 h
2017	Sweden Eva Nyström; Australia Adriel Young; 9:01:31 h	Sweden Kristin Larsson; Sweden Annika Ericsson; 10:03:32 h	Sweden Daniel Hansson; Sweden Jesper Svensson; 7:58:06 h
2016	Sweden Eva Nyström; Australia Adriel Young; 8:49:58 h	Sweden Kristin Larsson; Sweden Annika Ericsson; 9:32:03 h	Sweden Lelle Moberg; Sweden Daniel Hansson; 7:59:04 h
2015	Sweden Marika Wagner; Sweden Staffan Björklund; 8:55:39 h	Sweden Annika Ericsson; Sweden Maya Tesch; 10:30:36 h	Sweden Björn Englund; Canada Paul Krochak; 8:29:11 h
2014	Sweden Ulrika Eriksson; Sweden Jonas Udehn; 9:52:11 h	Sweden Bibben Nordblom; Sweden Charlotta Nilsson; 10:26:31 h	Sweden Lelle Moberg; Sweden Daniel Hansson; 8:16:12h
2013	Sweden Annika Ericsson; Sweden Fredrik Selmerde; 10:33:48 h	Sweden Bibben Nordblom; Sweden Charlotta Nilsson; 10:54:59 h	Sweden Björn Englund; Canada Paul Krochak; 8:35:00h
2012	Sweden Annika Åström; Sweden Fredrik Åström; 11:16:36 h	Sweden Helena Lindahl; Sweden Linda Sernfalk; 13:47:42 h	Sweden Magnus Olander; Sweden Lennart Moberg; 9:11:58 h
2011	Sweden Åsa Annerstedt; Sweden Joakim Axelsson; 11:10:18 h	Sweden Annika Åström; Sweden Karin Edvinsson; 12:28:01 h	Sweden Björn Englund; Finland Antti Antonov; 9:07:24 h
2010	Sweden Rebecca Nordholm; Sweden Johan Nyqvist; 11:32:29 h	Sweden Åsa Annerstedt; Sweden Annie Gustafsson; 11:15:42 h	Sweden Jonas Colting; Canada Gordo Byrn; 9:09:15 h
2009	Sweden Ingrid Stengård; Finland Mikko Kolehmainen; 11:06:16 h	Sweden Åsa Annerstedt; Sweden Annie Gustafsson; 11:09:36 h	Sweden Jonas Colting; Sweden Martin Flinta; 8:53:05 h
2008	-	-	Sweden Jonas Colting; Sweden Pasi Salonen; 10:14 h
2007	-	-	Sweden Martin Flinta; Sweden Ted Ås: h
2006	-	-	Finland Petri Forsman; Finland Ville Niemelä; 12:00 h
