= Jizerská padesátka =

- Status: active
- Genre: sporting event
- Date: February
- Frequency: annual
- Location: Jizera Mountains
- Country: Czech Republic
- Inaugurated: 1968

The Jizerská padesátka is a 50 kilometres long cross-country ski race which is held every year in the Jizera Mountains, Czech Republic. It debuted in 1968 became part of Worldloppet in the year 2000.

== History ==
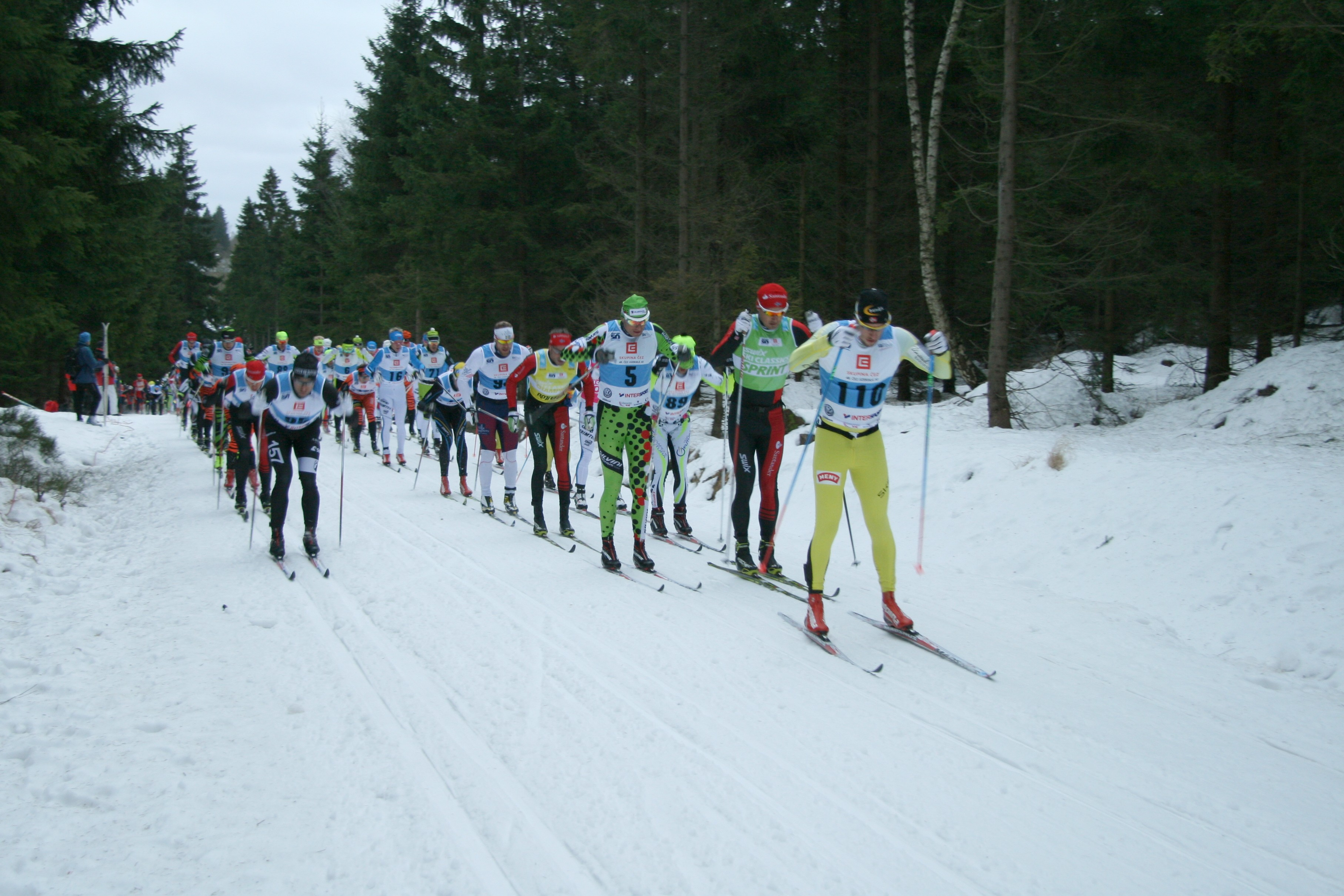
Jizerská padesátka

The beginning of the race goes back to the year 1968, when a group of mountain climbers of TJ Lokomotiva came with an idea of undertaking a race in the Jizera Mountains. They became the forerunners of what is nowadays known as the ‘Jizerská 50’.

The first race was held on 20 January 1968. There were 52 competitors who participated in the race from Bedřichov to Kořenov and back. The winner was Josef Driml of TJ Lokomotiva Liberec. In 1970 the members of the Peru expedition participated in this race. Unfortunately, they were all buried by an avalanche under Huascarán four months later. The fourth year of the race and all next years were therefore held in the memory of these brave men who died in Peru on 31 May 1970 during an infamous expedition.

The race became very popular and in 1978 nearly 8,000 competitors participated in the race. In past few years the track was changed, which was a lucky step in order to increase popularity and the value of the race. The Jizerská 50 is considered to be a very well organized race. In 1999 it was included in the Worldloppet Ski Federation and in 2003 it was for the first time held as a part of FIS Marathon Cup.

== Track ==
The race starts at the Bedřichov stadium and goes through Nová Louka, Kristiánov, Rozmezí Knajpa, Kasárenská road (along the Jizera river), Hraniční road, Vlašský hřeben, Bunkr, Jizerká, Pyramida, Bunkr, Promenadní road, Smědava, Knajpa, Na Čihadle, Štolpišská road, Krásná Máří, Hřebínek, Bílá Kuchyně, Olivetská hora, Vladní, U Buku and finishes again at Bedřichov stadium.

== Doping Tests ==
The first six men and six women to finish the race are subject to testing for the proscribed performance-enhancing substances. The others are tested only in the event of clear suspicion.

== Results ==
The result calculations are performed by a provider of modern technology for measuring the individual times of all participants. Every competitor is provided with a measurement chip before the start of the race. Participants are required to affix the chip to their left ankle in order to detect their precise time. If the race is completed without the measurement chip, the participant is disqualified.

== Provision of the race ==
The race is held by the Race Ski Club Jizerská padesátka. The Race Ski Klub Jizerská padesátka members are responsible for the entire organisation of the race. The participants of the race can refresh themselves at 6 refreshment stations along the track. Medical care is provided by the mountain rescue service of the Jizera Mountain region.
