= Seraina Boner =

Swiss cross-country skier

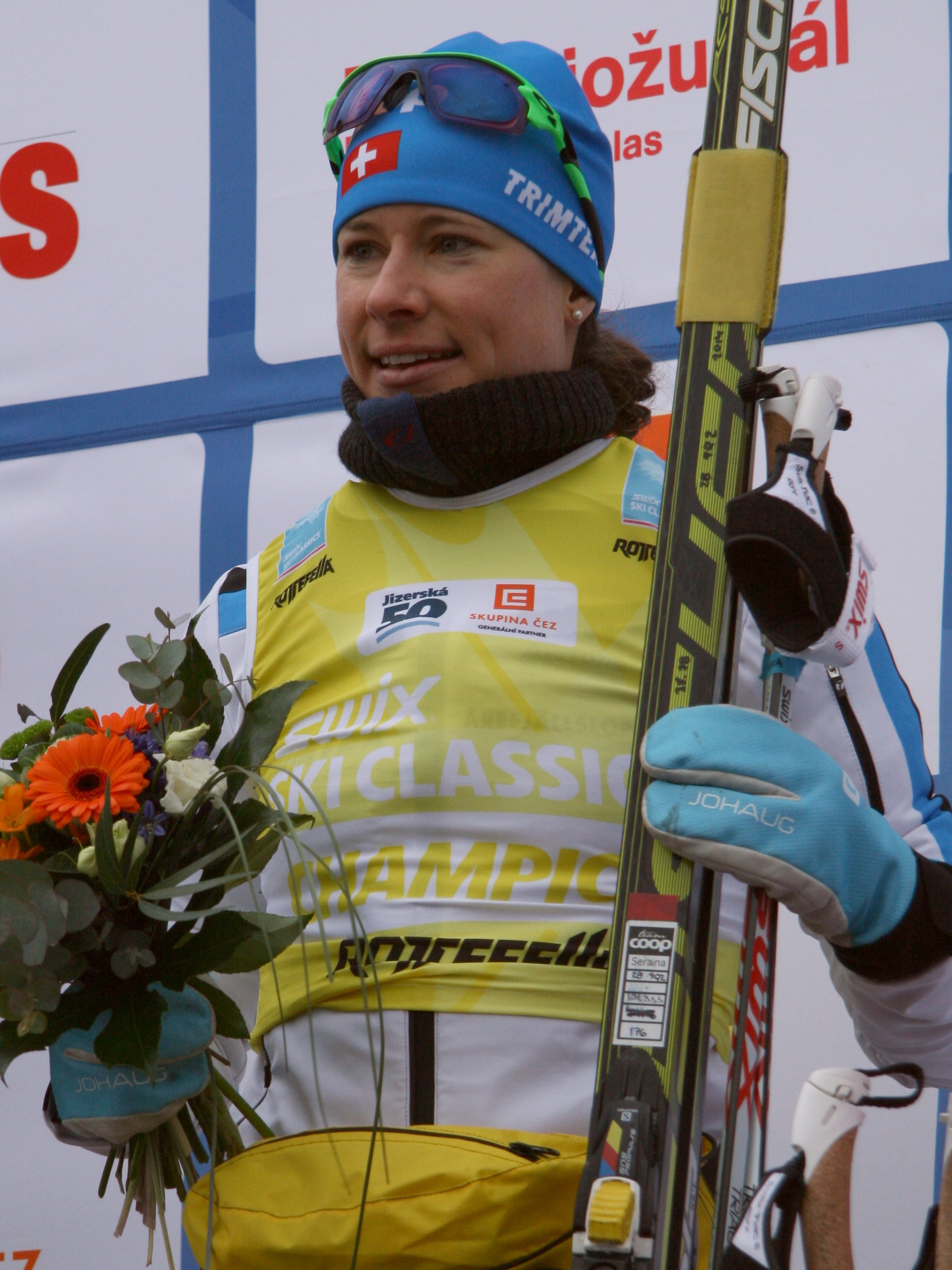

Personal information
- Nationality: Switzerland
- Born: 11 April 1982 (age 44) Davos, Grisons
- Height: 1.68 m (5 ft 6 in)

Sport
- Sport: Skiing
- Club: SC Klosters

World Cup career
- Seasons: 14 – (2004, 2006–2018)
- Indiv. starts: 77
- Indiv. podiums: 0
- Indiv. wins: 0
- Team starts: 10
- Team podiums: 0
- Team wins: 0
- Updated on 19 December 2018

Seraina Boner (born 11 April 1982) is a Swiss cross-country skier who has been competing since 1998. She has competed at the 2006 Winter Olympics in Torino and the 2014 Winter Olympics in Sochi.

== Cross-country skiing results ==
All results are sourced from the International Ski Federation (FIS).

=== Olympic Games ===
Year	Age	10 km individual	15 km skiathlon	30 km mass start	Sprint	4 × 5 km relay	Team sprint
2006	23	41	—	—	—	11	—
2014	31	—	—	9	—	—	6

=== World Championships ===
Year	Age	10 km individual	15 km skiathlon	30 km mass start	Sprint	4 × 5 km relay	Team sprint
2007	24	41	—	—	—	9	—
2015	32	9	—	15	—	—	7
2017	34	—	—	—	—	7	—

=== World Cup ===
==== Season standings ====
Season	Age	Discipline standings			Ski Tour standings			
Season	Age	Overall	Distance	Sprint	Nordic Opening	Tour de Ski	World Cup Final	Ski Tour Canada
2004	21	NC	NC	—	—N/a	—N/a	—N/a	—N/a
2006	23	NC	NC	—	—N/a	—N/a	—N/a	—N/a
2007	24	NC	NC	NC	—N/a	—	—N/a	—N/a
2008	25	98	66	NC	—N/a	—	DNF	—N/a
2009	26	127	93	NC	—N/a	DNF	—	—N/a
2010	27	NC	NC	NC	—N/a	—	—	—N/a
2011	28	111	75	NC	—	—	—	—N/a
2012	29	NC	NC	NC	44	—	—	—N/a
2013	30	NC	NC	—	—	—	—	—N/a
2014	31	91	59	—	—	—	—	—N/a
2015	32	72	52	61	38	DNF	—N/a	—N/a
2016	33	57	36	NC	—	DNF	—N/a	—
2017	34	NC	NC	—	—	—	—	—N/a
2018	35	NC	NC	—	—	—	—	—N/a
