= Forms of address in the United Kingdom =

Forms of address used in the United Kingdom are given below.

== Terminology ==
=== Abbreviations ===
Several terms have been abbreviated in the tables below. The forms used in the table are given first, followed by alternative acceptable abbreviations in parentheses. The punctuation of each abbreviation depends on the source. For example, the punctuation of "The Rt Hon" is not consistent throughout sources. The Gazette favours "The Rt. Hon.", while the government usually prefers "The Rt Hon" or "The Rt Hon."

- His/Her Majesty: HM (pl. TM)
- His/Her Royal Highness: HRH (pl. TRH)
- His/Her Grace: HG (pl. TG)
- The Most Honourable: The Most Hon (The Most Honble)
- The Right Honourable: The Rt Hon (The Rt Honble)
- The Honourable: The Hon (The Honble)
- The Much Honoured: The Much Hon (The Much Hon'd)
- The Most Reverend: The Most Rev (The Most Revd or The Most Rev'd)
- The Right Reverend: The Rt Rev (The Rt Revd or The Rt Rev'd)
- The Very Reverend: The Very Rev (The Very Revd or The Very Rev'd)
- The Reverend: The Rev (The Revd or The Rev'd)
- The Venerable: The Ven (The Venble)

"The Most Noble", which is an abbreviation of "The Most High, Potent, and Noble", is rarely used by Dukes and Duchesses; when used, the forenames of the peer or peeress can be used after "His Grace" but before "The Duke of [...]". This style is also sometimes used without "His Grace".

=== Names and territorial designations ===
- "London" represents the territorial designation of any peerage.
  - "Edinburgh" represents any territorial designation in Scotland.
  - "Birmingham" represents any manor in England or Wales.
- "John" and "William" represent any male name
- "Jane" and "Mary" represent any female name.
- "Smith" and "Brown" represent any surname, regardless of gender.

In regards to the nobility, Mary Brown represents a woman who married John Brown, while Jane Smith represents an unmarried woman.

== Royalty ==
Position	On envelopes	Salutation in letter	Oral address
King	HM The King	Your Majesty	Your Majesty, and thereafter as "Sir" (or the archaic "Sire")
Queen	HM The Queen	Your Majesty	Your Majesty, and thereafter as "Ma'am" (to rhyme with "jam")
Prince of Wales	HRH The Prince of Wales; HRH The Duke of Rothesay (in Scotland)	Your Royal Highness	Your Royal Highness, and thereafter as "Sir" (for males) or "Ma'am" (for females)
Princess of Wales	HRH The Princess of Wales; HRH The Duchess of Rothesay (in Scotland)	Your Royal Highness	Your Royal Highness, and thereafter as "Sir" (for males) or "Ma'am" (for females)
Princess Royal	HRH The Princess Royal	Your Royal Highness	Your Royal Highness, and thereafter as "Sir" (for males) or "Ma'am" (for females)
Royal peer	HRH The Duke/etc. of London, e.g. HRH The Duke of Edinburgh	Your Royal Highness	Your Royal Highness, and thereafter as "Sir" (for males) or "Ma'am" (for females)
Royal peeress	HRH The Duchess/etc. of London, e.g. HRH The Duchess of Edinburgh	Your Royal Highness	Your Royal Highness, and thereafter as "Sir" (for males) or "Ma'am" (for females)
Sovereign's son (unless a peer) Spouse to Queen suo jure (in the case of Prince Philip)	HRH The Prince John	Your Royal Highness	Your Royal Highness, and thereafter as "Sir" (for males) or "Ma'am" (for females)
Sovereign's son's wife (unless a peeress)	HRH The Princess John	Your Royal Highness	Your Royal Highness, and thereafter as "Sir" (for males) or "Ma'am" (for females)
Sovereign's daughter (unless a peeress)	HRH The Princess Mary	Your Royal Highness	Your Royal Highness, and thereafter as "Sir" (for males) or "Ma'am" (for females)
Sons of the Prince of Wales (unless a peer)	HRH Prince John of Wales, e.g. HRH Prince George of Wales	Your Royal Highness	Your Royal Highness, and thereafter as "Sir" (for males) or "Ma'am" (for females)
Daughters of the Prince of Wales (unless a peer)	HRH Princess Mary of Wales, e.g. HRH Princess Charlotte of Wales	Your Royal Highness	Your Royal Highness, and thereafter as "Sir" (for males) or "Ma'am" (for females)
Sovereign's son's son Prince of Wales's eldest son's sons (unless a peer)	HRH Prince John of London, e.g. HRH Prince Michael of Kent	Your Royal Highness	Your Royal Highness, and thereafter as "Sir" (for males) or "Ma'am" (for females)
Sovereign's son's son's wife (unless a peeress)	HRH Princess John of London, e.g. HRH Princess Michael of Kent	Your Royal Highness	Your Royal Highness, and thereafter as "Sir" (for males) or "Ma'am" (for females)
Sovereign's son's daughter Prince of Wales's eldest son's daughters if unmarried (unless a peeress)	HRH Princess Mary of London, e.g. HRH Princess Lilibet of Sussex	Your Royal Highness	Your Royal Highness, and thereafter as "Sir" (for males) or "Ma'am" (for females)
Sovereign's son's daughter Prince of Wales's eldest son's daughters if married (unless a peeress)	HRH Princess Mary, Mrs John Brown, e.g. HRH Princess Beatrice, Mrs Edoardo Mapelli Mozzi	Your Royal Highness	Your Royal Highness, and thereafter as "Sir" (for males) or "Ma'am" (for females)
Sovereign's son's son's son (unless a peer) (except sons of the eldest son of the Prince of Wales)	The Lord John Windsor, e.g. The Lord Nicholas Windsor	Dear Lord John	Lord John
Sovereign's son's son's son's wife (unless a peeress)	The Lady John Windsor, e.g. The Lady Nicholas Windsor	Dear Lady John	Lady John
Sovereign's son's son's daughter (unless a peeress) (except daughters of the eldest son of the Prince of Wales)	The Lady Mary Windsor, e.g. The Lady Helen Taylor	Dear Lady Mary	Lady Mary

== Nobility ==
The preposition of may be omitted in the form of Marquessates and Earldoms and included in the form of Scottish Viscountcies. It is not often present in peerage Baronies and Lordships of Parliament, though always present in Dukedoms and Scottish feudal Baronies.

The definite article the in the middle of two or more titles is sometimes capitalized, as in these tables. However this is controversial: traditional British guides use the lower-case the. As a single example, Debrett's gives "Major-General the Lord ...", and Pears' Cyclopaedia in the section on Modes of Address gives several examples where the definite article interior to a list of honours is lowercase.

=== Peers and peeresses ===
Position	On envelopes	Salutation in letter (Note: The forms given under "Salutation in Letter" are for use in social correspondence only. In formal letters, "Sir" or "Madam" would be used instead.)	Oral address
Duke	(The Most Noble) (His Grace) The Duke of London	My Lord Duke or Dear Duke (of London)	Your Grace or Duke
Duchess	(The Most Noble) (Her Grace) The Duchess of London	Madam or Dear Duchess (of London)	Your Grace or Duchess
Marquess	(The Most Hon) The Marquess (of) London	My Lord Marquess or Dear Lord London	My Lord or Your Lordship or Lord London
Marchioness	(The Most Hon) The Marchioness (of) London	Madam or Dear Lady London	My Lady or Your Ladyship or Lady London
Earl	(The Rt Hon) The Earl (of) London	My Lord or Dear Lord London	My Lord or Your Lordship or Lord London
Countess	(The Rt Hon) The Countess (of) London	Madam or Dear Lady London	My Lady or Your Ladyship or Lady London
Viscount	(The Rt Hon) The Viscount (of) London	My Lord or Dear Lord London	My Lord or Your Lordship or Lord London
Viscountess	(The Rt Hon) The Viscountess (of) London	Madam or Dear Lady London	My Lady or Your Ladyship or Lady London
Baron; Lord of Parliament	(The Rt Hon) The Lord London	My Lord or Dear Lord London	My Lord or Your Lordship or Lord London
Baroness (in her own right)	(The Rt Hon) The Baroness London or (The Rt Hon) The Lady London (Note: Nowadays it is more common to use the form of "The Baroness (of) X" when addressing a baroness in her own right, instead of the more archaric form of "The Lady (of) X", and to distinguish her from a baron's wife. This is customary when addressing female members of the House of Lords who have a life peerage, and as well the directive of Her Majesty's Passport Office.)	Madam or Dear Lady London	My Lady or Your Ladyship or Lady London
Baroness (in her husband's right); Lady of Parliament (in her or her husband's right)	(The Rt Hon) The Lady London	Madam or Dear Lady London	My Lady or Your Ladyship or Lady London

=== Eldest sons of dukes, marquesses and earls ===
Eldest sons of dukes, marquesses and earls use their father's most senior subsidiary title as courtesy titles, without "The" before the title. (Note: Some sources do not recommend the use of the definite article before certain courtesy titles (particularly those who have prospects of promotion within the family's titles), but it is used by official Court publications such as the Court Circular.) If applicable, eldest sons of courtesy marquesses or courtesy earls also use a subsidiary title from their (great) grandfather, which is lower ranking than the one used by their father. Eldest daughters do not have courtesy titles; all courtesy peeresses are wives of courtesy peers. (Note: If the definite article is not used before courtesy peerages and The Hon Elizabeth Smith marries Sir William Brown, she becomes The Hon Lady Brown, but if she marries the higher-ranked Lord Brown, a courtesy Baron, she becomes only Lady Brown. If this Sir William Brown's father is created Earl of London and Baron Brown, as a result of this ennoblement his wife's style will actually change, from "The Hon Lady Brown" to "Lady Brown". While the style may appear diminished, the precedence taken increases from that of a wife of a knight to that of a wife of an earl's eldest son.)

Position	On envelopes	Salutation in letter	Oral address
Courtesy marquess	Marquess (of) London	My Lord or Dear Lord London	My Lord or Lord London
Courtesy marquess's wife	Marchioness (of) London	Madam or Dear Lady London	My Lady or Lady London
Courtesy earl	Earl (of) London	My Lord or Dear Lord London	My Lord or Lord London
Courtesy earl's wife	Countess (of) London	Madam or Dear Lady London	My Lady or Lady London
Courtesy viscount	Viscount (of) London	My Lord or Dear Lord London	My Lord or Lord London
Courtesy viscount's wife	Viscountess (of) London	Madam or Dear Lady London	My Lady or Lady London
Courtesy baron Courtesy Lord of Parliament	Lord London	My Lord or Dear Lord London	My Lord or Lord London
Courtesy baron's wife Wife of courtesy Lord of Parliament	Lady London	Madam or Dear Lady London	My Lady or Lady London

=== Heirs of Scottish peers ===
Heirs-apparent and heirs-presumptive of Scottish peers use the titles "Master" and "Mistress"; these are substantive, not courtesy titles. If, however, the individual is the eldest son of a Duke, Marquess or Earl, then he uses the appropriate courtesy title, as noted above.

Position	On envelopes	Salutation in letter	Oral address
Scottish peer's heir-apparent or heir-presumptive	The Master of Edinburgh	Sir or Dear Master of Edinburgh	Sir or Master
Scottish peer's heiress-apparent or heiress-presumptive	The Mistress of Edinburgh	Madam or Dear Mistress of Edinburgh	Madam or Mistress

=== Male descendants of peers ===
Position	On envelopes	Salutation in letter	Oral address
Duke's younger son (Courtesy) Marquess's younger son	The Lord John Smith	My Lord or Dear Lord John (Smith)	My Lord or Lord John
Duke's younger son's wife (Courtesy) Marquess's younger son's wife	The Lady John Smith	Madam or Dear Lady John	My Lady or Lady John
(Courtesy) Earl's younger son (Courtesy) Viscount's son (Courtesy) Baron's son (Courtesy) Lord of Parliament's son	The Hon John Smith	Sir or Dear Mr Smith	Sir or Mr Smith
(Courtesy) Earl's younger son's wife (Courtesy) Viscount's son's wife (Courtesy) Baron's son's wife (Courtesy) Lord of Parliament's son's wife	The Hon Mrs John Smith	Madam or Dear Mrs Smith	Madam or Mrs Smith

=== Female descendants of peers ===
If a daughter of a peer or courtesy peer marries another peer or courtesy peer, she takes her husband's rank. If she marries anyone else, she keeps her rank and title, using her husband's surname instead of her maiden name.

Position	On envelopes	Salutation in letter	Oral address
Duke's daughter (Courtesy) Marquess's daughter (Courtesy) Earl's daughter (unmarried or married to a commoner)	The Lady Mary Smith (if unmarried), The Lady Mary Brown (husband's surname, if married)	Madam or Dear Lady Mary	My Lady or Lady Mary
(Courtesy) Viscount's daughter (Courtesy) Baron's daughter (Courtesy) Lord of parliament's daughter (unmarried)	The Hon Mary Smith	Madam or Dear Miss Smith	Madam or Miss Smith
(Courtesy) Viscount's daughter (Courtesy) Baron's daughter (Courtesy) Lord of Parliament's daughter (married to a commoner)	The Hon Mrs Brown (husband's surname)	Madam or Dear Mrs Brown	Madam or Mrs Brown

== Gentry and minor nobility ==
Knights and Baronets are distinguished by the use of "Bt" (or, archaically, "Bart") after the latter's names (and by the use of the appropriate post-nominal letters if the former are members of an Order of Chivalry). Esquires are distinguished by the use of "Esq" except in the case of a Scottish laird, whose territorial designation implies the rank of esquire.

=== Baronets ===
Position	On envelopes	Salutation in letter	Oral address
Baronet	Sir John Smith, Bt (or Bart)	Sir or Dear Sir John (Smith)	Sir or Sir John
Baronetess in her own right	Dame Mary Smith, Btss	Madam or Dear Dame Mary (Smith)	Madam or Dame Mary
Baronet's wife	Lady Brown	Madam or Dear Lady Brown	My Lady or Lady Brown
Baronet's divorced wife	Mary, Lady Brown	Madam or Dear Lady Brown	My Lady or Lady Brown
Baronet's widow	Mary, Lady Brown; Dowager Lady Brown, or Lady Brown (if the heir incumbent is unmarried)	Madam or Dear Lady Brown	My Lady or Lady Brown

=== Scottish barons ===
Barons in Scotland are non-peerage nobles in the Baronage of Scotland. The Scottish equivalent to an English baron is Lord of Parliament.

	Baron	Baroness or Baron's wife
Envelope	(The Much Hon) John Smith [of Edinburgh], Baron of Edinburgh or (The Much Hon) (The) Baron of Edinburgh (Incorrect: Baron Edinburgh) [of Edinburgh] if baron has territorial designation	(The Much Hon) Jane Smith, Baroness of Edinburgh or (The Much Hon) (The) Baroness of Edinburgh or (The) Lady Edinburgh
Salutation in a letter	Dear Baron (of Edinburgh) or Dear Edinburgh	Dear Baroness (of Edinburgh) or Dear Lady Edinburgh ("Dear Baroness Edinburgh" is incorrect)
Invitation / Place Card / Introduction	The Baron of Edinburgh Together: The Baron of Edinburgh and Lady Edinburgh	The Baroness of Edinburgh or Lady Edinburgh
Oral address	Baron or Edinburgh	Baroness or Lady Edinburgh

Position	On envelopes	Salutation in letter	Oral address
Scottish baron's heir-apparent or heir-presumptive	The Younger of Edinburgh	Sir or Dear Younger of Edinburgh	Sir or Master
Scottish baron's heiress-apparent or heiress-presumptive	The Maid of Edinburgh	Madam or Dear Maid of Edinburgh	Madam or Mistress
Scottish baron's's heir-apparent's wife	Mrs Smith, yr of Edinburgh	Madam or Dear Mrs Smith, Younger of Edinburgh	Madam or Mrs Smith
Scottish baron's's heir-apparent's wife (if baron has territorial designation)	Mrs Smith of Edinburgh, yr	Madam or Dear Mrs Smith of Edinburgh the Younger	Madam or Mrs Smith of Edinburgh
Scottish baron's younger daughters (if baron has territorial designation)	Miss Mary Smith of Edinburgh	Madam or Dear Miss Smith of Edinburgh	Madam or Miss Smith of Edinburgh

=== Knights and dames ===
Position	On envelopes	Salutation in letter	Oral address
Knight (of any order)	Sir John Smith	Sir or Dear Sir John (Smith)	Sir or Sir John
Lady (of the Order of the Garter or the Thistle)	Lady Mary Brown	Madam or Dear Lady Mary (Smith)	My Lady or Lady Mary
Dame (of an order other than the Garter or the Thistle)	Dame Mary Brown	Madam or Dear Dame Mary (Smith)	Madam or Dame Mary
Knight's wife	Lady Smith	Madam or Dear Lady Smith	My Lady or Lady Smith

=== Seigneurs of Fiefs (Channel Islands only) ===
Position	On envelopes	Salutation in letter	Oral address
Feudal Fief Seigneur	The Much Hon John Smith of Fief de Sausmarez or The Much Hon John Smith, Seigneur of Fief de Sausmarez or The Much Hon Seigneur of Fief de Sausmarez	Sir or Dear Sausmarez or Dear Sieur	Sausmarez or Seigneur or Abbreviated Sieur (Sgr.)
Female Feudal Dame of a Fief or Feudal Seigneur's wife	As feudal Seigneur, substituting "Madam" for first name and substituting "Dame" for "Seigneur", or Dame Sausmarez	Madam or Dear Dame or Dear Dame of Sausmarez	Madam or Sausmarez or Dame Sausmarez

=== Chiefs, chieftains and lairds ===
Position	On envelopes	Salutation in letter	Oral address
Chief, chieftain or laird (Only lairds recognised in a territorial designation by the Lord Lyon)	John Smith of Smith or John Smith of Edinburgh or John Smith of that Ilk or The Smith of Smith or The Smith of Edinburgh or The Smith (Note: The exact form of a Scottish chief's style varies from family to family, and is generally based on tradition rather than formal rules.) (only the 2nd form of address above applies to lairds)	Sir or Dear Edinburgh (if placename in title) or Dear Smith (otherwise)	Edinburgh (if placename in title) or Smith (otherwise)
Female Chief, chieftain or laird or Chief, chieftain or laird's wife	Chief, chieftain or laird's wife, substituting "Madam" or "Mrs" for first name or "The" or Lady Edinburgh	Madam or as on envelope	Madam or as on envelope
Chief (etc.)'s heir-apparent	John Smith of Edinburgh, yr or John Smith, yr of Edinburgh or John Smith of Edinburgh (last only if different first name to father)	Sir or Dear Younger of Edinburgh or Dear Mr Smith of Edinburgh	Sir or Young Edinburgh or The Younger of Edinburgh
Chief (etc.)'s heir-apparent's wife	Mrs Smith of Edinburgh, yr or Mrs Smith, yr of Edinburgh	Madam or Dear Mrs Smith of Edinburgh the Younger	Madam or Mrs Smith of Edinburgh
Chief (etc.)'s eldest daughter (if none senior)	Miss Smith of Edinburgh or Jane Smith, Maid of Edinburgh	Madam or Dear Miss Smith of Edinburgh or Dear Maid of Edinburgh	Madam or Miss Smith of Edinburgh or Maid of Edinburgh
Chief (etc.)'s younger daughter	Miss Mary Smith of Edinburgh	Madam or Dear Miss Smith of Edinburgh	Madam or Miss Smith of Edinburgh

=== Lords of the Manor (England and Wales) ===
Position	On envelopes	Salutation in letter	Oral address
Lord of the manor	John Brown, Lord of the manor of Birmingham or Lord of the manor of Birmingham or John Brown, Esq	Sir or Dear Lord of the manor of Birmingham	Sir or Lord of the manor
Lady of the Manor	Jane Brown, Lady of the Manor of Birmingham or Lady of the Manor of Birmingham	Madam or Dear Lady of the Manor of Birmingham	Madam or Lady of the Manor

== Clergy ==
=== Church of England ===
Similar styles are also applied to clergy of equivalent status in other religious organisations. The words clergy and cleric/clerk are derived from the proper term for bishops, priests and deacons still used in legal documents: Clerk in Holy Orders (e.g. "Vivienne Frances Faull, Clerk in Holy Orders"). Clergy in the Church of England are never addressed as "Revd (Surname)".

Position	On envelopes	Salutation in letter	Oral address
Archbishop	The Most Revd and Rt Hon The Lord Archbishop of Canterbury/York	Dear Archbishop	Your Grace or Archbishop
Diocesan bishop in Privy Council	The Rt Revd and Rt Hon The Lord Bishop of London	Dear Bishop	My Lord or Bishop
Bishop, diocesan or suffragan	The Rt Revd The Lord Bishop of Durham	Dear Bishop	My Lord or Bishop
Dean	The Very Revd The Dean of York	Dear Mr/Madam Dean	Dean or Mr/Madam Dean
Archdeacon	The Ven The Archdeacon of London	Dear Archdeacon	Archdeacon
Prebendary	The Revd Prebendary Smith	Dear Prebendary Smith	Prebend
Canon	The Revd Canon John Smith	Dear Canon	Canon
Priest	The Revd John Smith or The Revd Mr John Smith or The Revd Dr John Smith (if applicable)	Dear Mr/Mrs/Ms/Dr Smith	Mr/Mrs/Ms Smith or Vicar/Rector/Prebendary/Curate/Chaplain etc. as applicable
Deacon	The Revd Deacon John Smith or The Revd John Smith	Dear Mr/Mrs/Ms Smith or Dear Deacon Smith	Deacon Smith or Mr/Mrs/Ms Smith

=== Church of Scotland ===
The Church of Scotland, as a Presbyterian church, recognizes state-awarded titles only as courtesy. In court (assembly, presbytery and session) a person may only be addressed as Mr, Mrs, Miss, Dr, Prof, etc. depending on academic achievement. Thus ministers are correctly addressed as, for example, Mr Smith or Mrs Smith unless they have a higher degree or academic appointment e.g. Dr Smith or Prof. Smith. It is 'infra dig' to use the style 'Rev' and even the use of 'the Rev Mr' requires sensitivity to official style.

Position	On envelopes	Salutation in letter	Oral address
Lord High Commissioner to the General Assembly	His Grace The Lord High Commissioner	Your Grace	Your Grace or Sir/Ma'am
Clergy	The Rev John Smith	Dear Mr Smith	Mr Smith/Dr Smith etc.
Current Moderator of the General Assembly of the Church of Scotland	The Right Rev John Smith	Dear Mr Smith	Mr Smith/Dr Smith etc.
Former Moderators of the General Assembly of the Church of Scotland	The Very Rev John Smith	Dear Mr Smith	Mr Smith/Dr Smith etc.

== Judiciary ==
=== United Kingdom ===
Position	On envelopes	Salutation in letter	Oral address	In court
Male Justice of the Supreme Court holding a peerage	The Right Honourable The Lord Smith	Lord Smith	Lord Smith	My Lord
Male Justice of the Supreme Court	The Right Honourable Lord Smith	Lord Smith	Lord Smith	My Lord
Female Justice of the Supreme Court holding a peerage	The Right Honourable The Lady Smith	Lady Smith	Lady Smith	My Lady
Female Justice of the Supreme Court	The Right Honourable Lady Smith	Lady Smith	Lady Smith	My Lady

==== England and Wales ====
Position	On envelopes	Salutation in letter	Oral address	In court
Lord Chief Justice	The Rt Hon the Lord Chief Justice of England and Wales	Lord Chief Justice	Lord Chief Justice	My Lord
Male Lord Justice of Appeal	The Rt Hon Lord Justice (John) Smith	Lord Justice	Lord Justice	My Lord
Retired male Lord Justice of Appeal	The Rt Hon Sir John Smith	Judge or Sir John	Sir John	My Lord
Female Lord Justice of Appeal	The Rt Hon Lady Justice (Mary) Smith, DBE	Lady Justice	Lady Justice	My Lady
Retired female Lord Justice of Appeal	The Rt Hon Dame Mary Smith, DBE	Judge or Dame Mary	Dame Mary	My Lady
Male High Court judge	The Hon. Mr Justice (John) Smith	Judge	Judge	My Lord
Retired male High Court judge	Sir John Smith	Judge or Sir John	Sir John	My Lord
Female High Court judge	The Hon. Mrs Justice (Mary) Smith, DBE	Judge	Judge	My Lady
Retired female High Court judge	Dame Mary Smith, DBE	Judge or Dame Mary	Dame Mary	My Lady
High Court Master	Master (John) Smith (KC should be added if applicable)	Master	Master (Note: "Master" is used as the form of address whether the High Court Master is male or female.)	Master
Insolvency and Companies Court Judge	Insolvency and Companies Court Judge (John) Smith (KC, if applicable)	Judge	Judge	Judge
Circuit judge (Note: Some circuit judges – for example, the Recorder of Liverpool or circuit judges sitting in the Central Criminal Court – are addressed in court as "My Lord" or "My Lady".)	His Honour Judge (John) Smith (KC, if applicable)	Judge	Judge	Your Honour
Recorder	Mr (or Mrs) Recorder Smith (KC, if applicable)	Judge	Judge	Your Honour
District judge	District Judge (John) Smith (KC, if applicable)	Judge	Sir or Madam	Sir or Madam
Justice of the Peace/Magistrate	Mr John Smith, JP	Mr Smith	Mr Smith or (if "Chair/Lead") Sir or Madam	Sir or Madam (if 'Chair/Lead') or Your Worship
Chancellor of a diocese (ecclesiastical)	The Worshipful Mr (or Mrs) Smith (KC, if applicable)	Chancellor	Chancellor	Your Worship

A judge's first name only forms part of their judicial style if, at the time of their appointment, there is a senior judge with the same or a similar surname. Thus, if there is a "Mr Justice Smith", subsequent judges will be "Mr Justice John Smith", "Mrs Justice Mary Smith", etc. High Court Judges and above who are King's Counsel do not use the post-nominal letters following appointment or after retirement.

A member of the Bar (but not a solicitor) addresses a circuit judge or higher, out of court, as "Judge".

==== Scotland ====
Position	On envelopes	Salutation in letter	Oral address	In court
Lord President of the Court of Session/Lord Justice General of Scotland	The Rt Hon (the) Lord/Lady Smith Lord President of the Court of Session/Lord Justice General of Scotland	Lord President/Lord Justice General	Lord President/Lord Justice General	My Lord/Lady
Lord Justice Clerk	The Rt Hon (the) Lord/Lady Smith Lord Justice Clerk	Lord Justice Clerk	Lord Justice Clerk	My Lord/Lady
Senator of the College of Justice and the Chairman of the Scottish Land Court	The Hon./Rt Hon. (the) Lord/Lady Smith	Lord/Lady Smith	Lord/Lady Smith	My Lord/Lady
Sheriff principal	Sheriff Principal Smith (KC should be added where applicable)	Sheriff Principal Smith	Sheriff Principal Smith	My Lord/Lady
Sheriff	Sheriff Smith (KC should be added where applicable)	Sheriff Smith	Sheriff Smith	My Lord/Lady
Summary sheriff	Sheriff Smith (KC should be added where applicable)	Sheriff Smith	Sheriff Smith	My Lord/Lady
Justice of the Peace	Mr John/Mrs Mary Smith	Mr/Mrs Smith	Mr/Mrs Smith	Your Honour

== Academics ==
The forms of address used for academics can, in most cases, be either formal or social.

Position	On envelopes	Salutation in letter	Oral address	In conversation
Chancellor (formal)	The Chancellor of [university name]	Dear Chancellor	Chancellor (if on a platform) or by name and title	The Chancellor or by name
Chancellor (social)	[Name], (Note: This is the full name and title as it would be according to the rules elsewhere on this page, e.g. The Viscount London, Sir John Smith, KBE, Professor Jane Doe, Dr Tom Brown.) Chancellor of [university name]	By name	By name or Chancellor	The Chancellor or by name
Vice-Chancellor (formal)	The Vice-Chancellor of [university name] (Note: Check official title for the university concerned: The Reverend the Vice-Chancellor (Oxford) The Right Worshipful the Vice-Chancellor (Cambridge), The Vice-Chancellor and Warden (Durham), The President and Provost (UCL), etc.)	Dear Sir/Madam/Vice-Chancellor	Vice-Chancellor (if on a platform) or by name	The Vice-Chancellor or by name
Vice-Chancellor (social)	[Name], (Note: Title) Vice-Chancellor of [university name]	By name or Dear Vice-Chancellor	Vice-Chancellor (if on a platform) or by name	The Vice-Chancellor or by name
Professor (formal)	Professor Jane Smith (Note: If a professor holds an ecclesiastical rank this, strictly speaking, supersedes the academic rank. However, the academic style may still be used within academia and the two can be combined, e.g. as The Reverend Professor Jane Smith. If a professor holds a peerage or a knighthood, this title can be combined, e.g. Professor Lord Smith, Professor Sir John Smith, Professor Dame Jane Smith.)	Dear Sir/Madam	Professor Smith	Professor Smith
Professor (social)	Professor Jane Smith	Dear Professor Smith	Professor Smith	Professor Smith
Doctor (formal) (Note: The forms of address for a doctor applies to "the recipient of a doctorate conferred by a university or other body, such as the Council for National Academic Awards", not just those working in academia. The exception is surgeons, who are never addressed as Doctor even if they hold a doctorate.)	Dr Jane Smith or The Revd John Smith DD or Susan Brown MD or Tom Brown PhD, etc. (Note: Doctorates in divinity and medicine are always given as letters after the name, and this form may optionally be used for doctorates in other faculties. If "Dr" is used before the name, degrees are not given after it.)	Dear Sir/Madam	Dr Smith	Dr Smith
Doctor (social)	Dr Jane Smith	Dear Dr Smith	Dr Smith	Dr Smith

== See also ==
- Orders of precedence in the United Kingdom
- British nobility
- Orders, decorations, and medals of the United Kingdom
- Peerage
- Gentry
- List of post-nominal letters (United Kingdom)
