= Kranskulla =

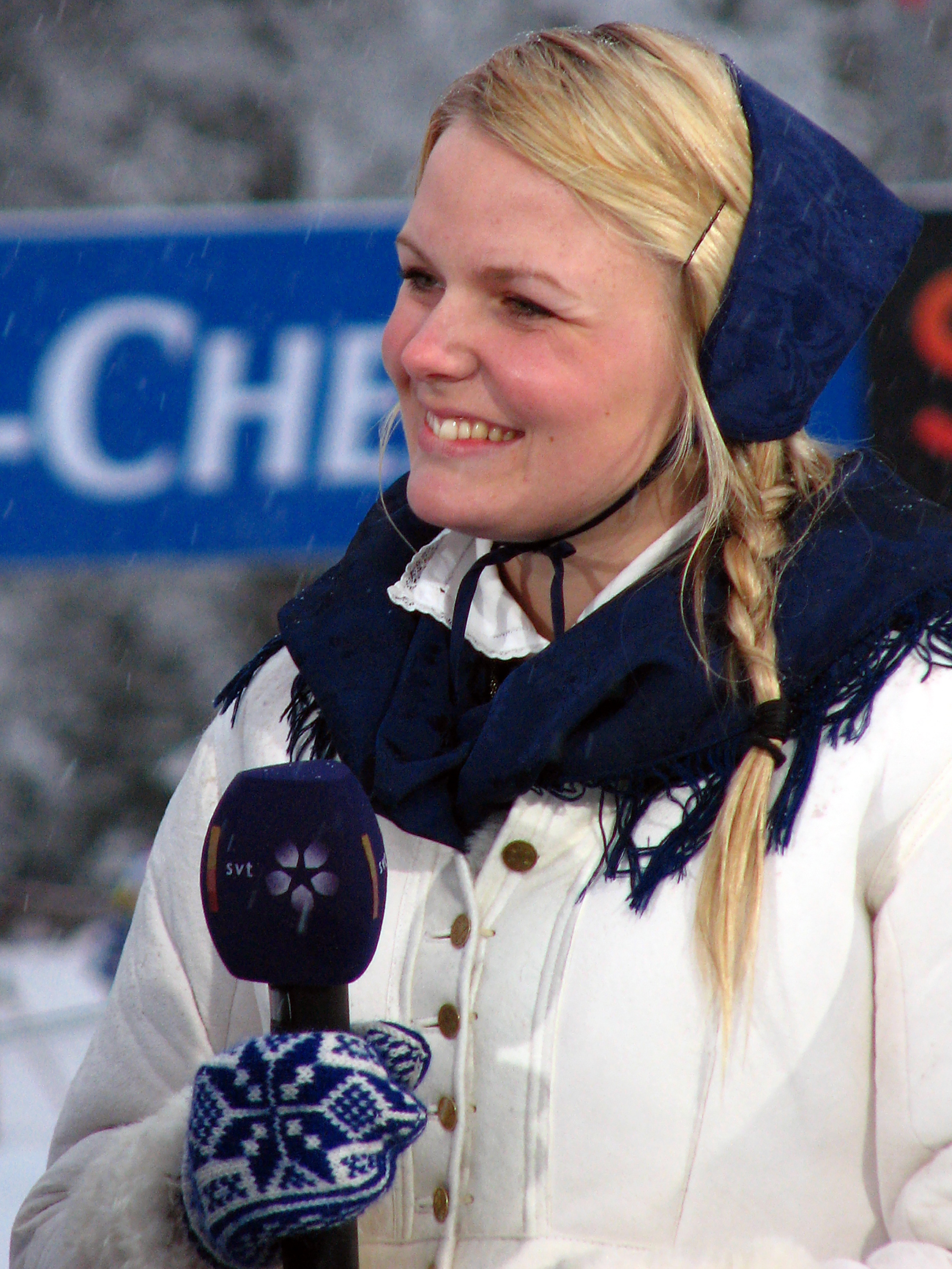
2008 kranskulla at Vasaloppet, Caroline Westling.

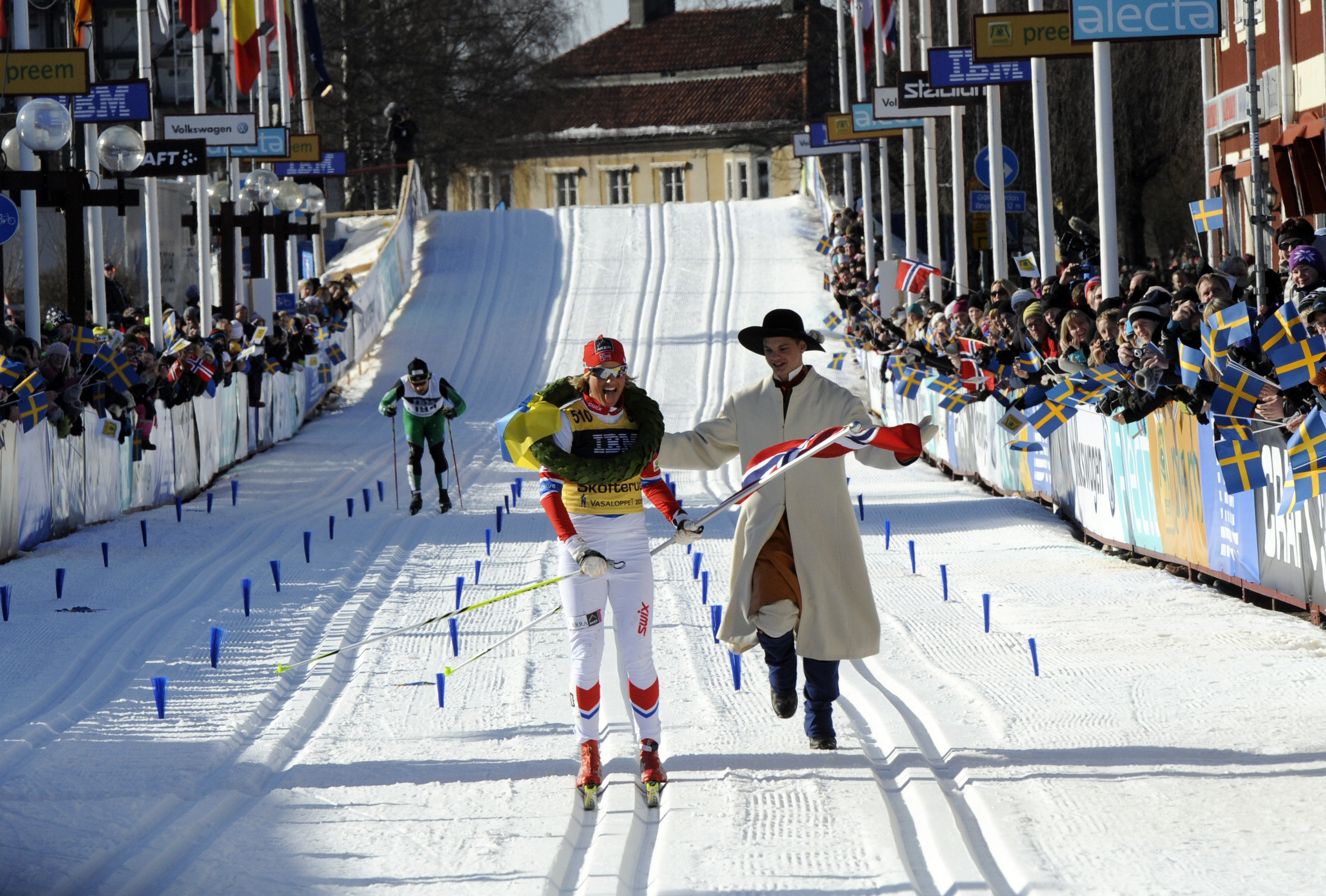
Kransmas Erik Smedhs and Vibeke Skofterud, 2012

A kranskulla ("Wreath Maiden") (after kulla) is a Swedish woman appointed annually to give the winner of the skiing competition Vasaloppet a laurel victory wreath by hanging it around his neck. A man doing the same task for women winners is called kransmas ("Wreath Man").

== History ==
At the first Vasaloppet, the organizers had ordered a victory wreath from gardener Linqvist. As he walked to the finish line to deliver the wreath, he spotted two women, Therese Eliasson and Svea Romson, dressed in their finest folk costumes and asked if one of them would like to hang the wreath around the neck of the winner. Eliasson accepted even if she was a little worried about how to do this if the winner was tall since she herself was small. However, when the winner Ernst Alm approached the finish line, he stumbled and fell to his knees and thus she had no problem fulfilling her task.

The first kransmas was not appointed, but rather a male skier from IFK Mora, Mikael Stenqvist, who in 1985 was asked by the organizers to perform a small "coup". He was dressed in folk costume and waited just before the finish line with a wreath for the first female skier to appear. It was Maria Canins-Bonaldi from Italy who got the wreath.

In 2006, Martin Johansson was appointed kransmas. He made the race himself, finishing in 44th place and had 15 minutes to change before hanging the victory wreath around the neck of women winner Italian Christina Paluselli.

== Function ==
A kranskulla is a Swedish woman appointed annually to give the winner of the skiing competition Vasaloppet a victory laurel wreath by hanging it around his neck. Mostly the kranskulla stands about 100 m (330 ft) from the finish line to give the winner (if it is apparent at that time) his wreath. She is dressed in the traditional folk costume of Dalarna.

A man doing the same task for women winners is called kransmas ("Wreath Man"). (Note: Mas is an older dialectal name for "man" in Dalarna.) This title became relevant with the event of the women's race, Tjejvasan in 1988. During the year they have been appointed for, the kranskulla and kransmas serve as ambassadors for the race.

=== Criteria ===
To be eligible for kranskulla, a woman must be unmarried, have distinguished herself in sports, worked at sports events and competitions. Her father's or other family members' sports merits are also taken into consideration. She must also represent one of the sports clubs IFK Mora or Sälens IF.

The criteria for the kransmas is that he must be a member of sports clubs IFK Mora or Sälens IF, a good representative and example for sports and/or a good sports coach, sports official or active in sports.

== In other competitions ==
Other competitions have adapted the use of kranskulla and kransmas after Vasaloppet. Even though these persons are not from Dalarna, the term and the old dialectal form has remained in the title. Since 1968, a kranskulla has been appointed for cross country running competition Lidingöloppet. Both a kranskulla and kransmas are appointed for open water swimming competition Vansbrosimningen. Cross-country ski race Skinnarloppet has a kranskulla, as do bicycle race Storsjön Runt.

== Vasaloppet ==
Women and men appointed kranskulla and kransmas for Vasaloppet.

=== Kranskulla ===
- 1922 – Therese Eliasson
- 1923 – Hilma Ström
- 1924 – Maja Lundgren
- 1925 – Elsa Cederlund
- 1926 – Aina Pers
- 1927 – Lea Ström
- 1928 – Stina Eriksson
- 1929 – Elin Henriksson
- 1930 – Ethel Eriksson
- 1931 – Anna-Britta Mattsson
- 1932 – Cancelled
- 1933 – Margit Nilsson
- 1934 – Cancelled
- 1935 – Marianne Edling
- 1936 – Inga-Greta Landeck
- 1937 – Gerda Berg
- 1938 – Majt Sundin
- 1939 – Anna-Greta Pettersson
- 1940 – Kerstin Cassel
- 1941 – Ingrid Asplund
- 1942 – Britt Herdin
- 1943 – Elsa Karlsson
- 1944 – Margareta Julin
- 1945 – Kerstin Sars
- 1946 – Elsa Sars
- 1947 – Nina Lindén
- 1948 – Ann-Mari Andersson
- 1949 – Kerstin Norlin
- 1950 – Karin Bergström
- 1951 – Inga Nyström
- 1952 – Åsa Mattson-Djos
- 1953 – Anna-Greta Beus
- 1954 – Birgitta Heimer
- 1955 – Kerstin Ingemansson
- 1956 – Gun Larsson
- 1957 – Barbro Persson
- 1958 – Anna-Greta Mattsson
- 1959 – Margareta Åhs
- 1960 – Maivor Olsson
- 1961 – Marianne Eriksson
- 1962 – Ann.Mari Hansson
- 1963 – Anita Håkansson
- 1964 – Anita Rosendahl
- 1965 – Gudrun Nilsson
- 1966 – Eva Runesson
- 1967 – Christina Fernström
- 1968 – Karin Abrahamsson
- 1969 – Christina Spansk
- 1970 – Karin Karlsson (now Green)
- 1971 – Ingegärd Backlund
- 1972 – Marianne Karlsson
- 1973 – Gunilla Lannerbro
- 1974 – Anna Mattsson
- 1975 – Lena Banck
- 1976 – Åsa Mattsson
- 1977 – Christina Andersson
- 1978 – Gunilla Lund
- 1979 – Britta Samuelsson
- 1980 – Inga-Britt Ax
- 1981 – Åsa Norell
- 1982 – Anna-Karin Winberg
- 1983 – Mait Eriksson
- 1984 – Marie Andersson
- 1985 – Eva Hermansson
- 1986 – Camilla Carlberg
- 1987 – Sara Kans
- 1988 – Karin Värnlund
- 1989 – Eva Lönn
- 1990 – Cancelled
- 1991 – Christel Asp
- 1992 – Maria Gustavsson
- 1993 – Helena Gezelius
- 1994 – Isabell Andersson
- 1995 – Malin Brandt
- 1996 – Katrin Svensson
- 1997 – Marika Engström
- 1998 – Ida Holmberg
- 1999 – Maria Wik
- 2000 – Emma Stefansson
- 2001 – Catharina Asph
- 2002 – Maria Bergqvist
- 2003 – Åsa Östberg
- 2004 – Lena Hermansson
- 2005 – Eva Lif
- 2006 – Julia Limby
- 2007 – Eva Svensson
- 2008 – Caroline Westling
- 2009 – Sandra Brander
- 2010 – Helene Söderlund
- 2011 – Frida Dahl
- 2012 – Johanna Axelsson
- 2013 – Isabelle Jansson
- 2014 – Lisa Englund
- 2015 – Viktoria Stärner
- 2016 – Hanna Eriksson
- 2017 – Lydia Sundin

=== Kransmas ===
- 1988 – Axel Jungward
- 1989 – Mattias Helgesson
- 1990 – Cancelled
- 1991 – Erik Frykberg
- 1992 – Erik Eriksson
- 1993 – Jonas Orsén
- 1994 – Staffan Larsson
- 1995 – Mikael Helgesson
- 1996 – Thomas Sparr
- 1997 – Jonas Buud
- 1998 – Torbjörn Schedvin
- 1999 – Stefan Hansson
- 2000 – Thomas Eriksson
- 2001 – Niklas Karlsson
- 2002 – Mikael Hedh
- 2003 – Andreas Johansson
- 2004 – Niclas Jacobsson
- 2005 – Markus Leijon
- 2006 – Martin Johansson
- 2007 – Lars Suther
- 2008 – Joakim Engström
- 2009 – Jonas Nilsson
- 2010 – Johan Öhagen
- 2011 – Anders Solin
- 2012 – Erik Smedhs
- 2013 – André Gatu
- 2014 – Daniel Svensson
- 2015 – Victor Gustafsson
- 2016 – Johan Wellert
- 2017 – Linus Rapp
