= Vasaloppet =

Annual Swedish cross-country ski race

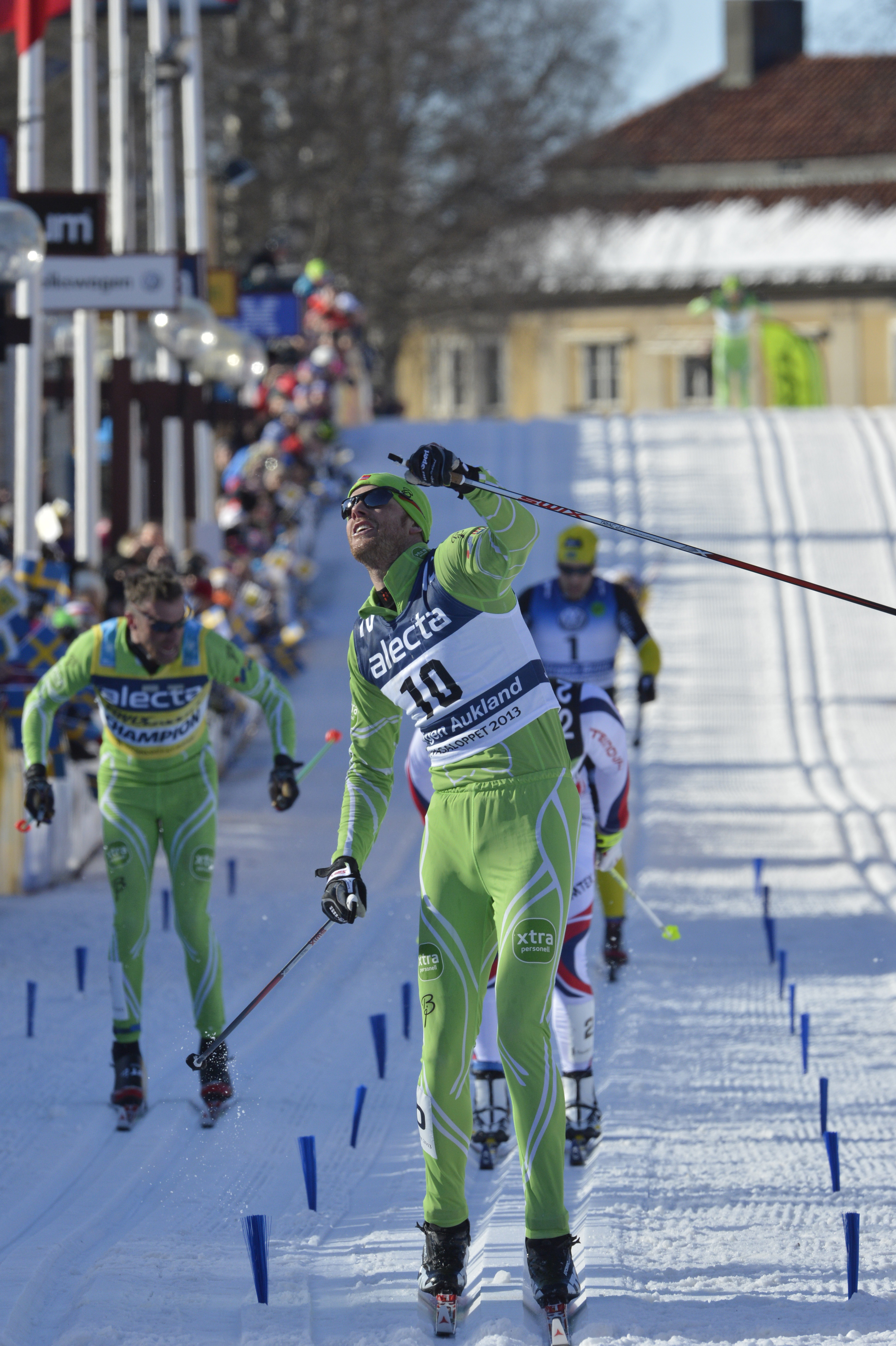
- Jørgen Aukland, Norway, winning the 2013 men's event
- Status: Active
- Genre: Sports event
- Date: First Sunday in March
- Frequency: Annually
- Location: Sälen–Mora
- Country: Sweden
- Years active: 104
- Inaugurated: 1922
- Founder: Anders Pers
- Participants: 15,800
- Attendance: 70,200 (2015)
- Budget: SEK 120 million (2012)
- Major events: Cross-country skiing
- Organiser: IFK Mora; Sälens IF
- Sponsor: Volvo; IBM; Preem; Stadium AB

Vasaloppet (Swedish for 'the Vasa race') is an annual long distance cross-country ski race held on the first Sunday of March. The 90 km (56 mi) course starts in the village of Berga, just south of Sälen in western Dalarna, Sweden, and ends in the town of Mora in the central part of the province. It is the oldest cross-country ski race in the world, as well as the one with the highest number of participants.

The race was inspired by a notable journey King Gustav Vasa made from Mora to Sälen when he was fleeing from Christian II's soldiers during the winter of 1520–1521. According to legend, he fled on skis. The modern competition started in 1922 and it has been a part of the Worldloppet events since 1979.

== Origin ==
In 1520, the young nobleman Gustav Ericsson Vasa was fleeing from the troops of Christian II, king of Denmark, Sweden and Norway (the Kalmar Union). Much of the Swedish nobility was in opposition to the king, and had nicknamed him Christian the Tyrant. In a move to silence the opposition, Christian invited the Swedish aristocracy to a reconciliation party in Stockholm, only to have them, including Gustav's parents, massacred in what came to be known as the Stockholm Bloodbath.

Gustav fled through Dalarna, fearing for his life if he were discovered by the king's troops. He spoke to the men of Mora at a gathering and tried to convince them to raise a levy and start a rebellion against King Christian. The men refused to join the rebellion, and Gustav started out west, toward Norway to seek refuge. However, the men in Mora changed their minds after hearing that the rulers had decided to raise taxes, and now they wanted to join the rebellion with Gustav as their leader. They sent out the two best skiers in the county, two brothers from Mora, Lars and Engelbrekt, to search for him and they caught up with him at Sälen. On 6 June 1523, Gustav Vasa was crowned King of Sweden, after having defeated king Christian and dissolved the Kalmar Union.

While Gustav traveled from Mora to Sälen, the modern race is run the opposite way, finishing in Mora.

== History ==
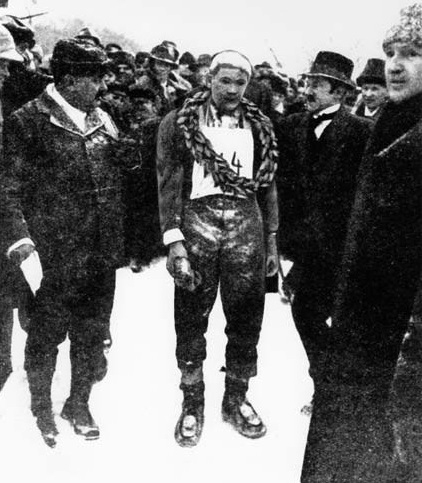
Ernst Alm, first winner, 1922

The idea for the race was published in Westmanlands Läns Tidning on 10 February 1922 by Anders Pers from Mora. On 5 March 1922, the board of IFK Mora decided to organize a trial race. Newspaper Dagens Nyheter sponsored the race with SEK 1,000 and with finances secured the first race was held on 19 March 1922. 136 participants registered for the race and 119 started. The winner was 22-year-old Ernst Alm from Norsjö Sports Club in 7:32:49. He also remained the youngest winner of the race for almost 103 years, until Alvar Myhlback won in 2025, age 18.

In the 80th race, held on 7 March 2004, about 15,500 skiers competed in the main event. More than 40,000 participated in one of the seven different races held during the first week of March. Vasaloppet is one of the races in the long distance cup Ski Classics.

When Swedish Prime Minister Olof Palme was assassinated just two days before the race in 1986, a cancellation of that year's race was considered. However, the race proceeded as planned with the 10,000 participants observing a moment of silence before the start.

No races were held between 1942 & 1945, however, 2021 did hold a smaller race.

=== Women's participation ===
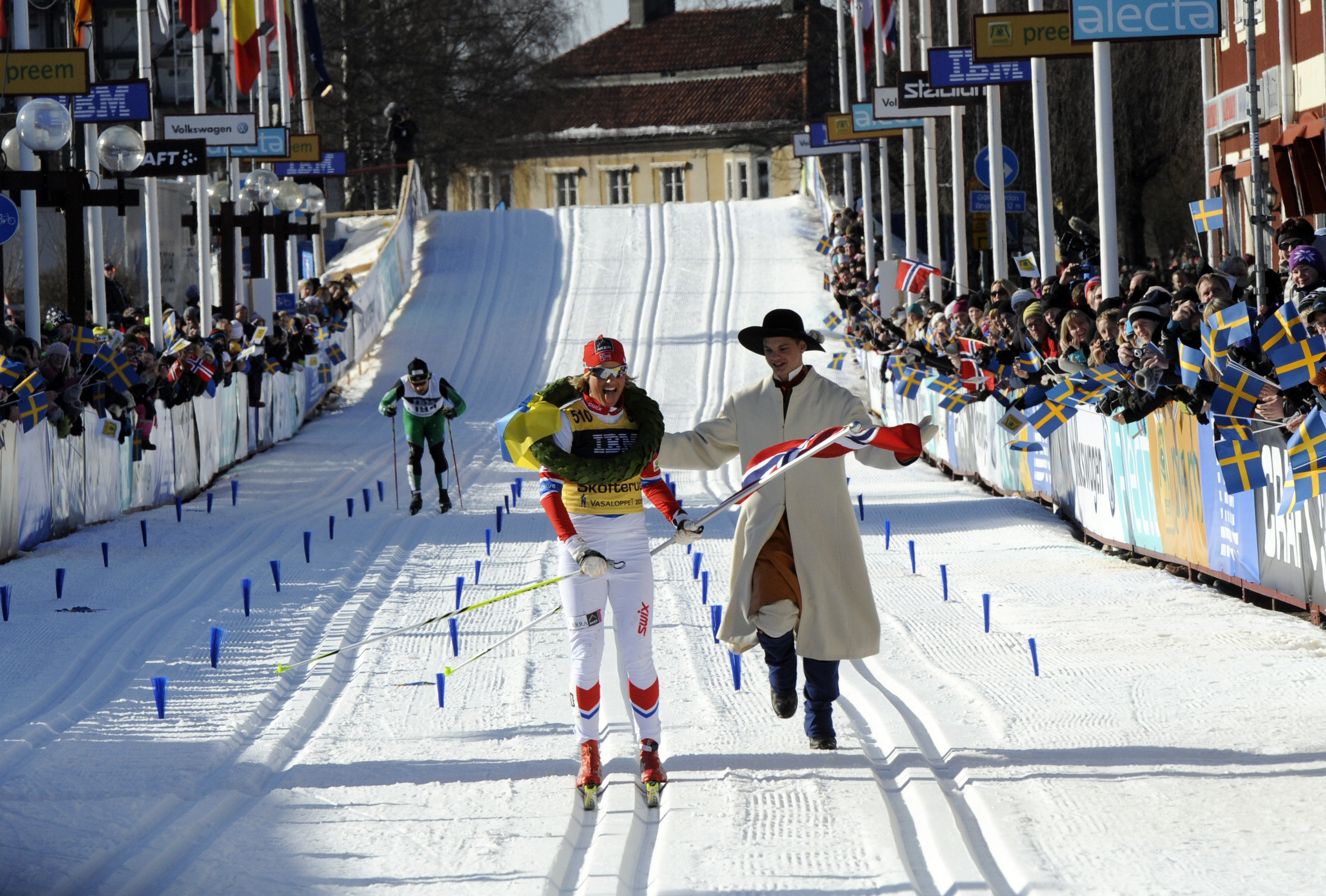
Kransmas Erik Smedhs and Vibeke Skofterud, 2012

Women winners in Vasaloppet have received awards since 1997. Before that, in 1922–23 and 1981–96, women were allowed to race, but did not receive awards. The first woman to participate was Margit Nordin from Grängesberg in 1923, at 10:09:42. Falu Kuriren wrote about the event: "... an incredible ovation greeted the only lady competitor, Miss Margit Nordin. Miss Nordin was lifted high on strong arms and she received flowers and cheers".

Through the years following the first race, there were many heated debates about women's participation. A majority of officials, mostly male, within sports organizations as well as in society in general, were opposed to women in the race. This led to women being banned from the race from 1924 until 1980. The ban was introduced because it was considered bad for women's health to participate in such a competition. The ban was criticized, especially after 1960. Some defended the ban saying that allowing women would diminish the race's reputation as a tough challenge. Several women did nevertheless participate during the ban, disguised as men. Two of the women who disguised themselves in 1978, Birgitta Westhed and Britt Dohsé, were assisted by professional make-up artist from the Gothenburg City Theatre, who changed their looks using wigs, moustache and a full beard. Westhed was interviewed by TV during the race, which put women's participation higher on the media agenda.

=== Motto ===
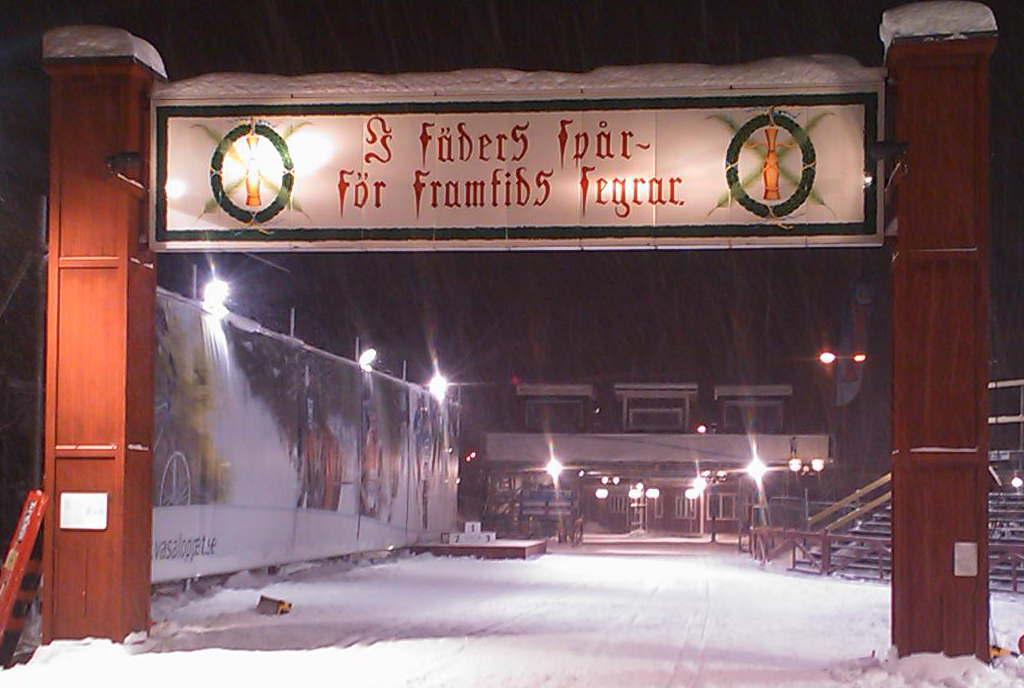
Finish portal

The motto of Vasaloppet I fäders spår för framtids segrar ('In [our] fathers' tracks for future victories') is written on a portal erected over the finish line in Mora. At the first race, the finish line was simply marked with white board between two flag poles with the word Mål ('Finish') on it. The second year a more stately portal with the motto was fashioned. In 1986, the portal was made permanent and has since become a significant landmark in Mora.

=== Kranskulla and kransmas ===
A tradition connected to the race is the custom to choose a kranskulla. This is a woman who is given the honor of hanging a laurel victory wreath around the neck of the winner of the race as he crosses the finish line. She is dressed in the traditional folk costume of Dalarna. With the introduction of the women's race, Tjejvasan in 1988, a male kransmas is also appointed. During the year, those who have been appointed as kranskulla and kransmas serve as ambassadors for the race.

== The race ==
=== Organization ===
The race is organized by the non-profit organization Vasaloppsföreningen Sälen-Mora that was registered with the Swedish Companies Registration Office in 1992 and is owned by two local sports clubs, IFK Mora and Sälens IF. The organization has approximately 35-year-round employees who work with planning, preparing and developing the events.

=== Stations ===
Traditionally since 1958, blåbärssoppa ('bilberry-soup') made by Ekströms food company, is served at the stations along the course. The Swedish word for bilberry, blåbär, literally means 'blueberry'. About 50,000 liters are served during the Vasaloppet week. In addition, sports drinks and "Vasaloppet buns" are also served. Coffee is served at the Eldris station.

For a number of years, Ekströms had the logo for their blåbärssoppa printed on the number tags worn by the participants in the race. The word blåbär was printed in large bold letters, which resulted in the participants being called blåbär — a double meaning and pun since the word is also used to describe a "rookie".

Vasaloppet stations

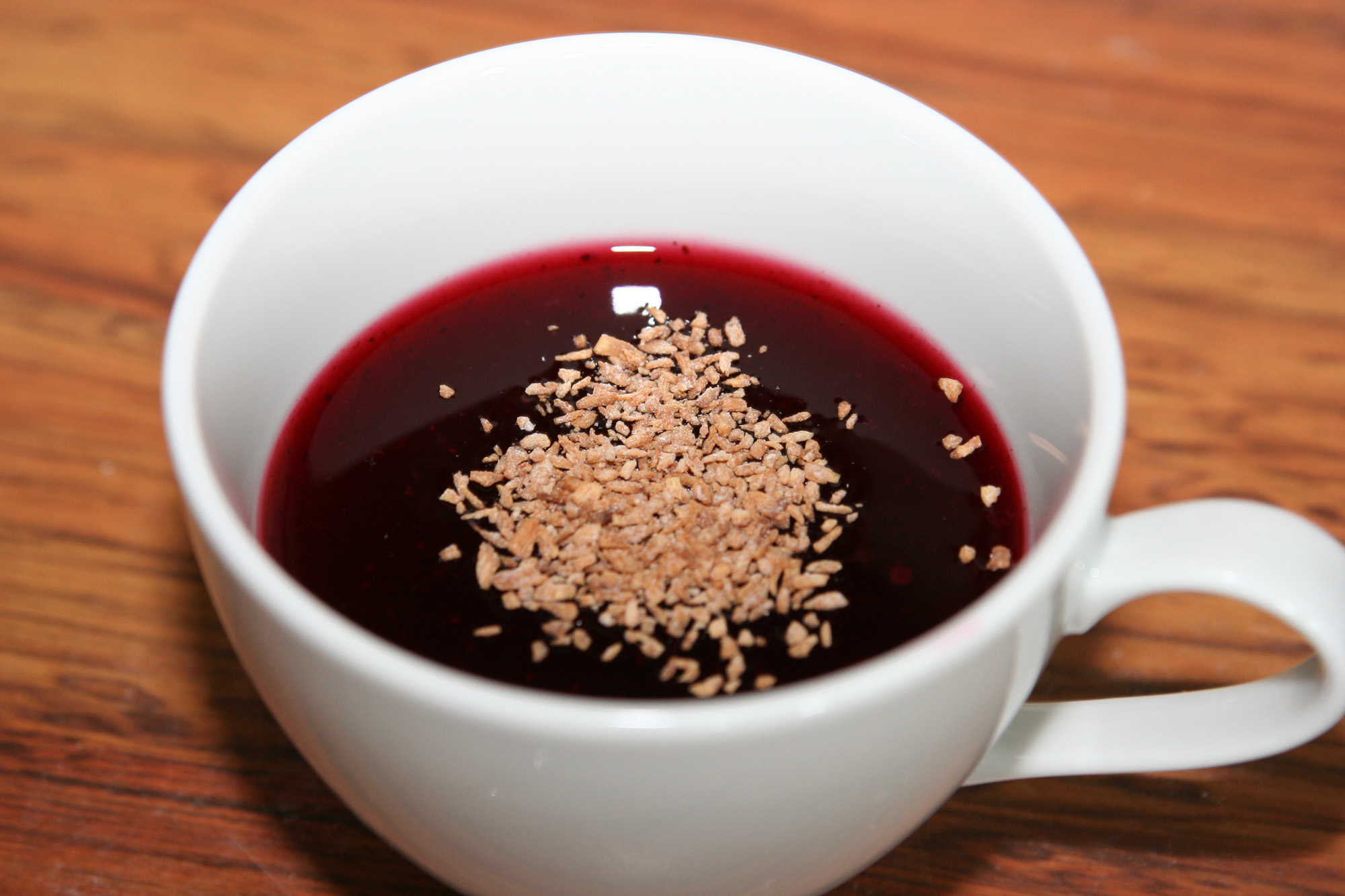
A cup of blåbärssoppa

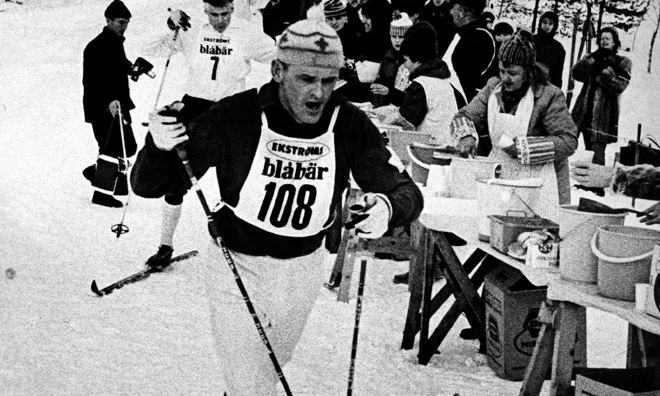
Assar Rönnlund as blåbär 108 in 1967

- Berga by, 0 km (0 mi)
- Smågan, 11 km (6.8 mi)
- Mångsbodarna, 24 km (15 mi)
- Risberg, 35 km (22 mi)
- Evertsberg, 47 km (29 mi)
- Oxberg, 62 km (39 mi)
- Hökberg, 71 km (44 mi)
- Eldris, 81 km (50 mi)
- Mora, 90 km (56 mi)

=== Track profile ===
Location	Distance	Elevation	Coordinates
Berga	0 km (0 mi)	350 m (1,150 ft)	61.105556°N 13.304167°E
Sprängsbackarna	5 km (3.1 mi)	525 m (1,722 ft)	61.130197°N 13.338928°E
Smågan	11 km (6.8 mi)	480 m (1,570 ft)	61.124093°N 13.426329°E
Långheden	17 km (11 mi)	520 m (1,710 ft)	61.095614°N 13.509009°E
Mångsbodarna	24 km (15 mi)	425 m (1,394 ft)	61.079390°N 13.619093°E
Tennäng	29 km (18 mi)	315 m (1,033 ft)	61.079165°N 13.687726°E
Risberg	35 km (22 mi)	420 m (1,380 ft)	61.085556°N 13.773056°E
Lyttran	37 km (23 mi)	380 m (1,250 ft)	61.093893°N 13.806360°E
Evertsberg	47 km (29 mi)	430 m (1,410 ft)	61.138376°N 13.962904°E
Björnarvet	57 km (35 mi)	215 m (705 ft)	61.113132°N 14.107093°E
Kvarnbäcken	60 km (37 mi)	265 m (869 ft)	61.115937°N 14.150596°E
Oxberg	62 km (39 mi)	230 m (750 ft)	61.114820°N 14.176688°E
Hökberg	71 km (44 mi)	250 m (820 ft)	61.074956°N 14.309514°E
Eldris	81 km (50 mi)	205 m (673 ft)	61.015236°N 14.410089°E
Mora	90 km (56 mi)	165 m (541 ft)	61.007490°N 14.545555°E

=== The Rope ===
The Rope, also referred to as "The Dreaded Rope", is a series of ropes drawn across the track at certain times to prevent participants, who have no chance of reaching the finish line in Mora before the area is closed, to continue. The ropes in Vasaloppet are drawn at seven of the stations: Smågan, Mångsbodarna, Risberg, Evertsberg, Oxberg, Hökberg and Eldris. The race starts at 8:00 a.m. and the finish area is closed at 8:15 p.m. just before the prize ceremony. There is artificial light from Eldris, but skiers should not go in darkness before that place, which also sets a limit for the rope times.

== World cup race ==
Since 1978, Vasaloppet is included in the Worldloppet Ski Federation, a series of long-distance cross-country skiing races. In 2006, the Vasaloppet was included in the FIS Cross-Country World Cup; a large complement of World Cup racers joined the men's field for the full 90 km (56 mi) distance. Owing to the distance—40 km (25 mi) longer than the longest race usually skied in the World Cup—as well as the proximity to the just-concluded Olympic Games in Turin, the race was again dominated by long-distance specialists rather than World Cup racers. Daniel Tynell won the race, just ahead of Jerry Ahrlin, while Anders Aukland – who has skied on both the Norwegian national World Cup team and in marathons like the Vasaloppet – finished third. The women's World Cup Vasaloppet was held over 45 km (28 mi) the previous day, rather than being integrated with the full Vasaloppet. Marit Bjørgen from Norway won, though the field included only World Cup racers, since the marathon specialists chose to race in the full-distance event the next day.

== Vasaloppet's Winter Week ==
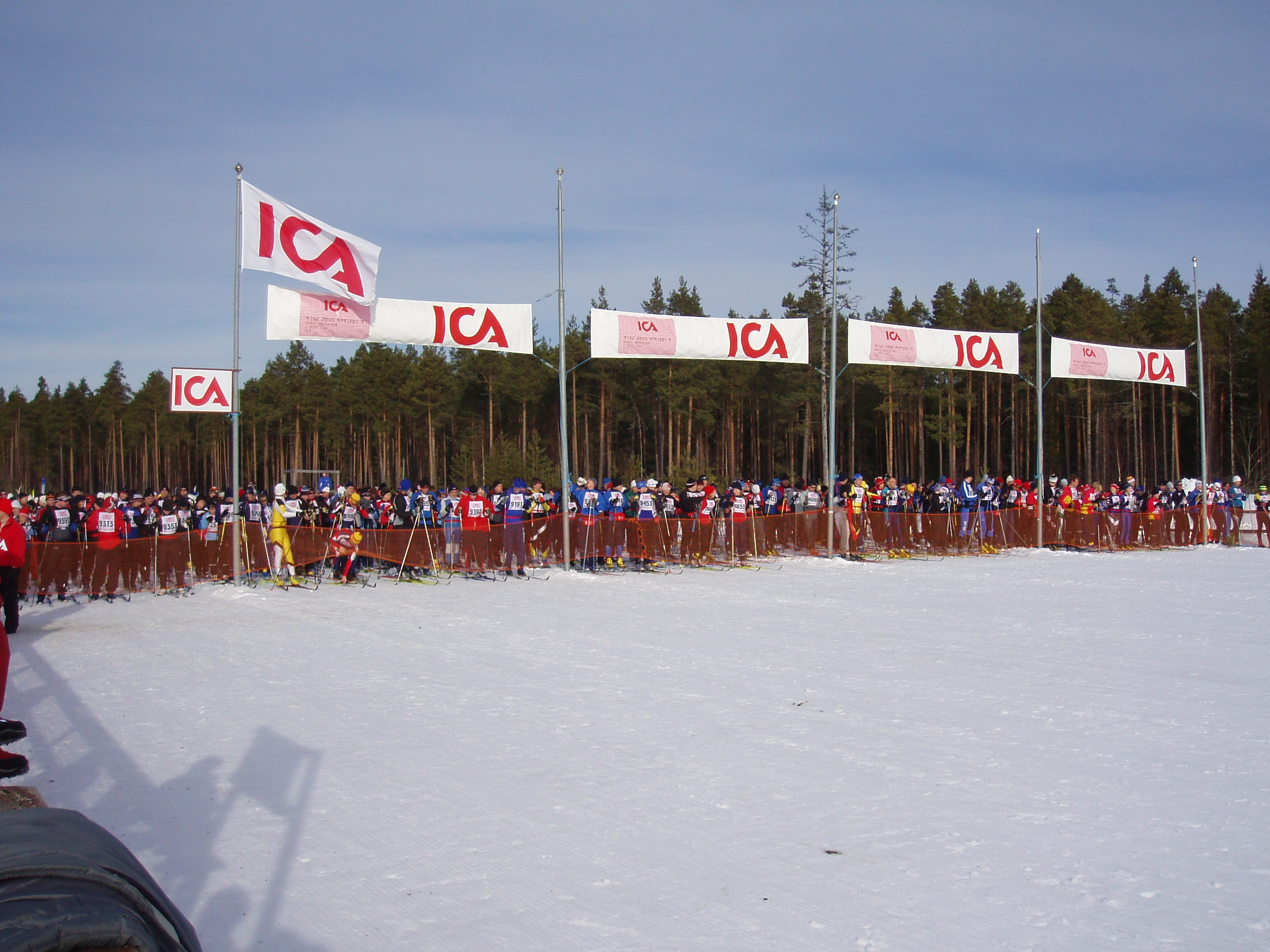
Kortvasan start in Oxberg, 2006

The week preceding Vasaloppet is known as Vasaloppet's Winter Week. Races held during this week include 15 different ski races, in both classical and free style technique:

- Vasaloppet 30 (short – 30 km (19 mi))
- Tjejvasan (ladies – 30 km (19 mi))
- Vasaloppet 45 (half – 45 km (28 mi))
- Ungdomsvasan (9–16 years old – 3–9 km (1.9–5.6 mi))
- Öppet spår (non-competitive – 90 km (56 mi))
- Stafettvasan (relay – 90 km (56 mi))
- Nattvasan (individually or two-person teams make the original race at night in darkness – 90 km (56 mi))
- Vasaloppet (original – 90 km (56 mi))

The Vasaloppet’s Winter Week 2027 calendar:

Friday, February 26, Vasaloppet 30, start Oxberg, 30 km

Saturday, February 27, Tjejvasan, start Oxberg, 30 km

Sunday, February 28, Öppet Spår Sunday, start Sälen, 90 km

Sunday, February 28, Vasaloppet Pro Race 30, start Oxberg, 30 km

Sunday, February 28, Ungdomsvasan, start Eldris, 9 km, start Hökberg, 19 km

Monday, March 1, Öppet Spår Monday 90, freestyle, start Sälen, 90 km

Monday, March 1, Öppet Spår Monday 45, freestyle, start Oxberg, 45 km

Monday, March 1, Öppet Spår Monday 30, freestyle, start Oxberg, 30 km

Tuesday, March 2, Vasaloppet 45, start Oxberg, 45 km

Friday, March 5, Stafettvasan, ski relay, five sections, start Sälen, 90 km

Friday, March 5, Nattvasan 30, individually or two-person teams, freestyle, start Oxberg, 30 km

Friday, March 5, Nattvasan 45, individually or two-person teams, freestyle, start Oxberg, 45 km

Friday, March 5, Nattvasan 90, individually or two-person teams, freestyle, start Sälen, 90 km

Saturday, March 6, Vasaloppet 10, freestyle, start Eldris, 9 km

Sunday, March 7, The 103rd Vasaloppet, start Sälen, 90 km

== Statistics ==
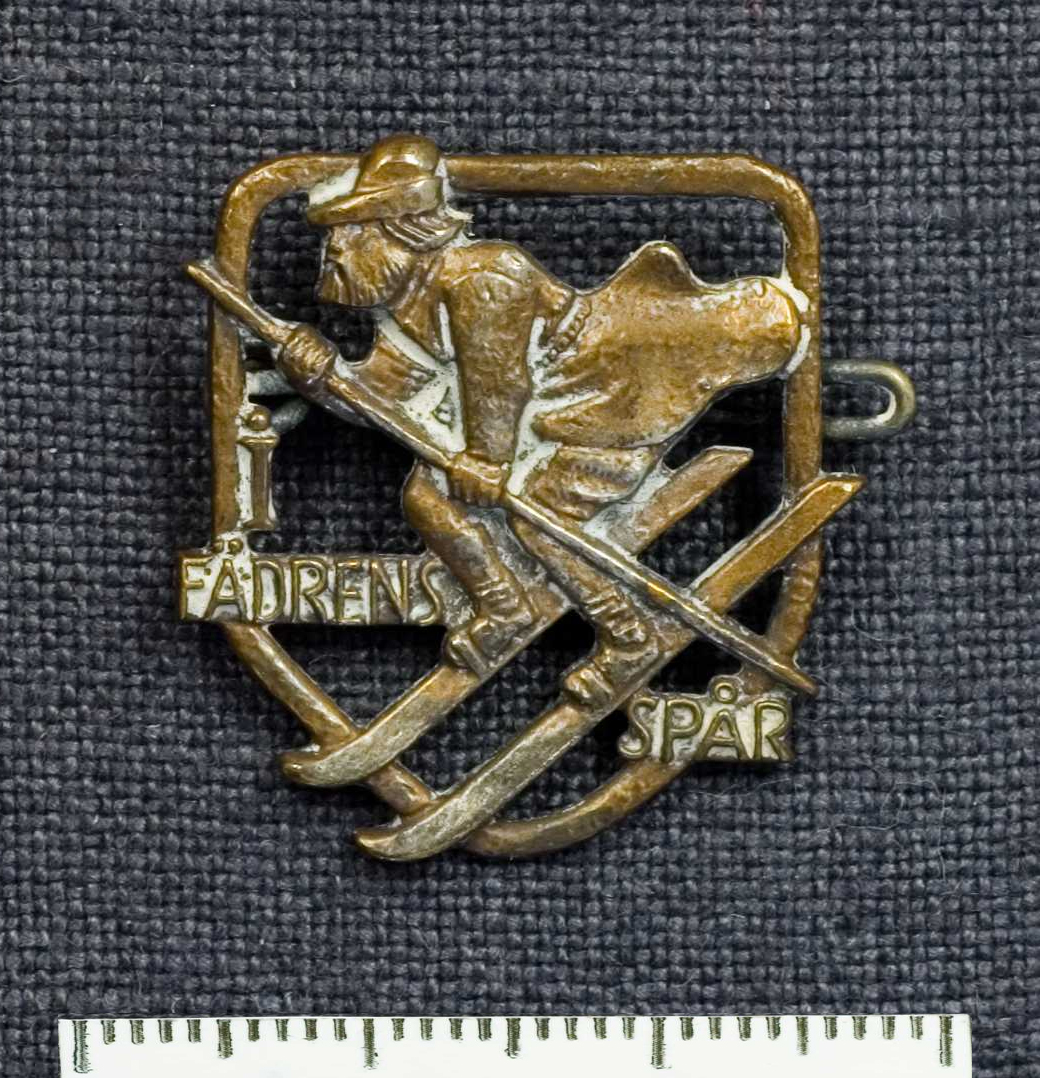
One of the earliest Vasaloppet pin badges.

=== Multiple winners ===
Men

Nils 'Mora-Nisse' Karlsson has the most titles, with 9. Janne Stefansson (7), Jan Ottosson (4), Arthur Häggblad (4), Bengt Hassis (3), Oskar Svärd (3), Daniel Tynell, Jörgen Brink (3) and John Kristian Dahl (3) are the only other racers with more than two titles. Six men have two titles.

Women

Sofia Lind has the most titles, with 4. Four women have two titles.

=== Time ===
The average winning time is 5:11:38 (a per-kilometer average of 3:28). The record winning time is 3:28:18 (2:19 per kilometer), set by Tord Asle Gjerdalen of Norway in 2021. Only 17 winners have finished in less than four hours.

Konrad Hallenbarter from Switzerland, is the first to win a Vasaloppet under four hours,3:58:08, in 1983.

The ten fastest times include six Swedes and four Norwegians. Of the ten fastest times, one occurred in the 1980s, one in the 1990s, two in the 2000s, two in the 2010s and four in the 2020s.

In 2021 course records were set for both men and women. Before that the fastest year was 2012, also with course records for both men and women.

Ten fastest times

1. 2021: Tord Asle Gjerdalen (NOR) – 3:28:18
2. 2025: Alvar Myhlback (SWE) - 3:28:45
3. 2022: Andreas Nygaard (NOR) - 3:32:18
4. 2023: Emil Persson (SWE) – 3:37:43
5. 2012: Jörgen Brink (SWE) – 3:38:41
6. 1998: Peter Göransson (SWE) – 3:38:57
7. 2004: Anders Aukland (NOR) – 3:48:42
8. 1986: Bengt Hassis (SWE) – 3:48:55
9. 2013: Jørgen Aukland (NOR) – 3:50:49
10. 2005: Oskar Svärd (SWE) – 3:51:47

=== Average times ===
Average times per decade have declined in each ten-year span, with the sharpest drop between decade averages occurring in the 1960s, for which the average winning time was 31:45 faster than the average winning time of the 1950s. The average winning time in the 1970s was 16:07 faster than the 1960s, the 1980s average was 24:09 faster than the 1970s, and the 1990s average was 13:06 faster than the 1980s. The average winning time in the 2000s is only 2:18 faster than the 1990s, however. As of 2011 the average winning time so far in the 2010s is 12:12 faster than the 2000s.

=== Winners' nationalities ===
Sweden is the most prolific producer of winners, with 74 titles (including two all-Sweden ties, in 1928 and 1988), or 90% of the 82 contested races. (The race was canceled in 1932, 1934, and 1990). Norway has produced seven winners: Ole Ellefsæter, 1971; Anders Aukland, 2004; Jørgen Aukland, 2008 and 2013; John Kristian Dahl, 2014, 2016 and 2017, Petter Eliassen, 2015, Andreas Nygaard, 2018, Tore Björseth Berdal, 2019. Two countries have produced two winners: Finland (Pekka Kuvaja, 1954; Pauli Siitonen, 1973) and Austria (Walter Mayer, 1980; Mikhail Botvinov, 1997). Five countries have produced one winner: East Germany (Gert-Dietmar Klause, 1975), the Soviet Union (Ivan Garanin, 1977), France (Jean-Paul Pierrat, 1978), Switzerland (Konrad Hallenbarter, 1983), and Estonia (Raul Olle, 2000).

Sweden won every race until 1954, when Pekka Kuvaja of Finland won the race. The next non-Swede to win was Ole Ellefsæter of Norway (1971), who kicked off a decade in which Sweden won just five titles and racers from five other countries won the five other titles. Sweden won 8 of the titles in the 1980s (Austria [Mayer, 1980] and Switzerland [Hallenbarter, 1983] each won one title in that decade), and 8 more in the 1990s (Austria won one more title in that decade [Botvinov, 1997], and the race was canceled once [1990]). In the 2000s, Sweden won seven races, Norway won twice (Anders Aukland, 2004; Jørgen Aukland, 2008), and Estonia won once (Olle, 2000).

== Winners ==
=== Men ===
Year	Name	Club/Nation	Time
1922	Ernst Alm	IFK Norsjö, Sweden	7:32:49
1923	Oskar Lindberg	IFK Norsjö, Sweden	6:32:41
1924	John Lindgren	IFK Umeå, Sweden	6:53:26
1925	Sven Utterström	Bodens BK, Sweden	6:03:55
1926	Per-Erik Hedlund	Malungs IF, Sweden	5:36:07
1927	Konrad Pettersson	Luleå SK, Sweden	6:19:32
1928	Per-Erik Hedlund and Sven Utterström (tie)	Särna SK, Sweden; Bodens BK, Sweden	5:33:23
1929	Johan Abram Persson	Arjeplogs SK, Sweden	6:38:22
1930	Verner Lundström	Arvidsjaurs IF, Sweden	6:56:30
1931	Anders Ström	IFK Mora, Sweden	6:37:47
1932	Cancelled		
1933	Arthur Häggblad	IFK Umeå, Sweden	5:57:09
1934	Cancelled		
1935	Arthur Häggblad	IFK Umeå, Sweden	6:08:55
1936	Sven Hansson	Lima IF, Sweden	6:31:55
1937	Arthur Häggblad	IFK Umeå, Sweden	6:05:56
1938	Elias Nilsson	Östersunds SK, Sweden	5:48:28
1939	Alfred Lif	Orsa IF, Sweden	5:35:59
1940	Arthur Häggblad	IFK Umeå, Sweden	6:23:57
1941	Mauritz Brännström	IFK Norsjö, Sweden	6:51:12
1942	Olle Wiklund	IFK Bergvik, Sweden	5:31:50
1943	Nils 'Mora-Nisse' Karlsson	IFK Mora, Sweden	5:47:10
1944	Gösta Andersson	IFK Umeå, Sweden	5:18:43
1945	Nils 'Mora-Nisse' Karlsson	IFK Mora, Sweden	6:27:59
1946	Nils 'Mora-Nisse' Karlsson	IFK Mora, Sweden	6:08:42
1947	Nils 'Mora-Nisse' Karlsson	IFK Mora, Sweden	5:59:35
1948	Nils 'Mora-Nisse' Karlsson	IFK Mora, Sweden	5:35:13
1949	Nils 'Mora-Nisse' Karlsson	IFK Mora, Sweden	5:44:09
1950	Nils 'Mora-Nisse' Karlsson	IFK Mora, Sweden	6:08:25
1951	Nils 'Mora-Nisse' Karlsson	IFK Mora, Sweden	5:27:20
1952	Sigfrid Mattsson	Skarpnäcks IF, Sweden	5:09:45
1953	Nils 'Mora-Nisse' Karlsson	IFK Mora, Sweden	5:01:55
1954	Pekka Kuvaja	Finland	6:22:51
1955	Sixten Jernberg	Lima IF, Sweden	5:27:28
1956	Sigvard Jonsson	Rossöns IK, Sweden	5:23:36
1957	Gunnar Larsson	Oxbergs IF, Sweden	6:23:40
1958	Gunnar Larsson	Oxbergs IF, Sweden	5:31:50
1959	Sune Larsson	Oxbergs IF, Sweden	5:13:28
1960	Sixten Jernberg	Lima IF, Sweden	5:13:26
1961	David Johansson	Delsbo IF, Sweden	4:45:10
1962	Janne Stefansson	Sälens IF, Sweden	5:07:46
1963	Janne Stefansson	Sälens IF, Sweden	4:56:25
1964	Janne Stefansson	Sälens IF, Sweden	5:32:07
1965	Janne Stefansson	Sälens IF, Sweden	4:35:03
1966	Janne Stefansson	Sälens IF, Sweden	5:52:38
1967	Assar Rönnlund	IFK Umeå, Sweden	5:20:22
1968	Janne Stefansson	Sälens IF, Sweden	4:39:49
1969	Janne Stefansson	Sälens IF, Sweden	4:50:07
1970	Lars-Arne Bölling	IFK Mora, Sweden	5:08:38
1971	Ole Ellefsæter	Norway	5:12:56
1972	Lars-Arne Bölling	IFK Mora, Sweden	5:35:19
1973	Pauli Siitonen	Finland	4:42:11
1974	Matti Kuosku	Högbo IF, Sweden	5:06:23
1975	Gert-Dietmar Klause	East Germany	4:20:29
1976	Matti Kuosku	Högbo IF, Sweden	4:09:07
1977	Ivan Garanin	Soviet Union	4:30:34
1978	Jean-Paul Pierrat	France	5:20:12
1979	Ola Hassis	Orsa IF, Sweden	4:05:58
1980	Walter Mayer	Austria	4:08:02
1981	Sven-Åke Lundbäck	IFK Råneå, Sweden	4:29:32
1982	Lasse Frykberg	IFK Mora, Sweden	4:28:50
1983	Konrad Hallenbarter	Switzerland	3:58:08
1984	Hans Persson	Åsarna IK, Sweden	4:14:14
1985	Bengt Hassis	Orsa IF, Sweden	4:45:43
1986	Bengt Hassis	Orsa IF, Sweden	3:48:55
1987	Anders Larsson	Bondsjöhöjden, Sweden	4:20:20
1988	Anders Blomquist and Örjan Blomquist (tie)	IFK Lidingö, Sweden; IFK Lidingö, Sweden	4:47:04
1989	Jan Ottosson	Åsarna IK, Sweden	5:09:33
1990	Cancelled		
1991	Jan Ottosson	Åsarna IK, Sweden	5:07:11
1992	Jan Ottosson	Åsarna IK, Sweden	3:57:04
1993	Håkan Westin	Graningealliansen, Sweden	4:02:10
1994	Jan Ottosson	Åsarna IK, Sweden	4:06:19
1995	Sven-Erik Danielsson	Dala-Järna IK, Sweden	4:11:09
1996	Håkan Westin	Graningealliansen, Sweden	4:01:15
1997	Michail Botvinov	Austria	4:11:41
1998	Peter Göransson	Åsarna IK, Sweden	3:38:57
1999	Staffan Larsson	IFK Mora, Sweden	4:31:37
2000	Raul Olle	Estonia	4:14:38
2001	Henrik Eriksson	IFK Mora, Sweden	4:01:22
2002	Daniel Tynell	Falun/Borlänge SK, Sweden	3:58:52
2003	Oskar Svärd	Sollefteå SK, Sweden	3:58:23
2004	Anders Aukland	Norway	3:48:42
2005	Oskar Svärd	Ulricehamns IF, Sweden	3:51:47
2006	Daniel Tynell	Grycksbo IF, Sweden	4:34:09
2007	Oskar Svärd	Ulricehamns IF, Sweden	4:43:40
2008	Jørgen Aukland	Team Xtra Personnel, Norway	4:13:45
2009	Daniel Tynell	Grycksbo IF, Sweden	4:10:56
2010	Jörgen Brink	Hudiksvalls IF, Sweden	4:02:59
2011	Jörgen Brink	Hudiksvalls IF, Sweden	3:51:51
2012	Jörgen Brink	Team United Bakeries, Sweden	3:38:41
2013	Jørgen Aukland	Team Xtra Personnel, Norway	3:50:49
2014	John Kristian Dahl	Team United Bakeries, Norway	4:14:33
2015	Petter Eliassen	Team LeasePlan Go, Norway	4:01:48
2016	John Kristian Dahl	Team United Bakeries, Norway	4:08:00
2017	John Kristian Dahl	Team United Bakeries, Norway	3:57:18
2018	Andreas Nygaard	Norway	4:24:36
2019	Tore Bjørseth Berdal	Norway	4:39:15
2020	Petter Eliassen	Norway	4:25:14
2021	Tord Asle Gjerdalen	Norway	3:28:18
2022	Andreas Nygaard	Norway	3:32:18
2023	Emil Persson	Sweden	3:37:43
2024	Torleif Syrstad	Norway	3:52:43
2025	Alvar Myhlback	Sweden	3:28:45
2026	Oskar Kardin	Sweden	4:14:45

=== Women ===
Year	Name	Club/Nation	Time
1997	Sofia Lind	Åsarna IK, Sweden	5:06:35
1998	Kerrin Petty	IFK Mora, citizen of United States	4:17:02
1999	Sofia Lind	Åsarna IK, Sweden	5:04:50
2000	Svetlana Nageykina	Russia	4:52:35
2001	Ulrica Persson	SK Bore, Sweden	4:31:05
2002	Svetlana Nageykina	Belarus	4:38:47
2003	Ulrica Persson	SK Bore, Sweden	4:32:57
2004	Sofia Lind	Åsarna IK, Sweden	4:20:28
2005	Sofia Lind	Åsarna IK, Sweden	4:24:09
2006	Cristina Paluselli	Italy	4:59:24
2007	Elin Ek	IFK Mora, Sweden	4:48:29
2008	Sandra Hansson	Uddevalla IS, Sweden	4:47:16
2009	Sandra Hansson	Uddevalla IS, Sweden	4:43:13
2010	Susanne Nyström	IFK Mora, Sweden	4:33:07
2011	Jenny Hansson	Östersunds SK, Sweden	4:25:30
2012	Vibeke Skofterud	Slitu IF, Norway	4:08:24
2013	Laila Kveli	Lierne IL, Norway	4:22:22
2014	Laila Kveli	Lierne IL, Norway	4:31:57
2015	Justyna Kowalczyk	Poland	4:41:02
2016	Kateřina Smutná	Czech Republic	4:17:56
2017	Britta Johansson Norgren	Sollefteå SK, Sweden	4:19:43
2018	Lina Korsgren	(Sweden) Åre Längdskidklubb, Swedensv	4:41:50
2019	Britta Johansson Norgren	Sollefteå SK, Sweden	4:54:24
2020	Lina Korsgren	Åre Längdskidklubb, Sweden	4:41:02
2021	Lina Korsgren	Åre Längdskidklubb Sweden	3:52:08
2022	Astrid Øyre Slind	Norway	3:50:06
2023	Emilie Fleten	Norway	4:04:08
2024	Emilie Fleten	Norway	4:23:06
2025	Stina Nilsson	Sweden	3:54:00
2026	Emilie Fleten	Norway	4.24.26

== Sister races ==
- Vasaloppet USA, held annually on the second Saturday of February in Mora, Minnesota, USA (prior to 2015, the race occurred annually on the second Sunday of February)
- Vasaloppet Japan, held in Asahikawa, Hokkaido, since 1981
- Chinese Vasaloppet, held in Changchun since 2003
- Botniavasan, Finland, since 2006
- Vasaloppet de la Sergerie, Jonquière, Quebec, Canada, since 2007
- Cykelvasan, summer cycling race using the Vasaloppet course.

== Notable participants ==
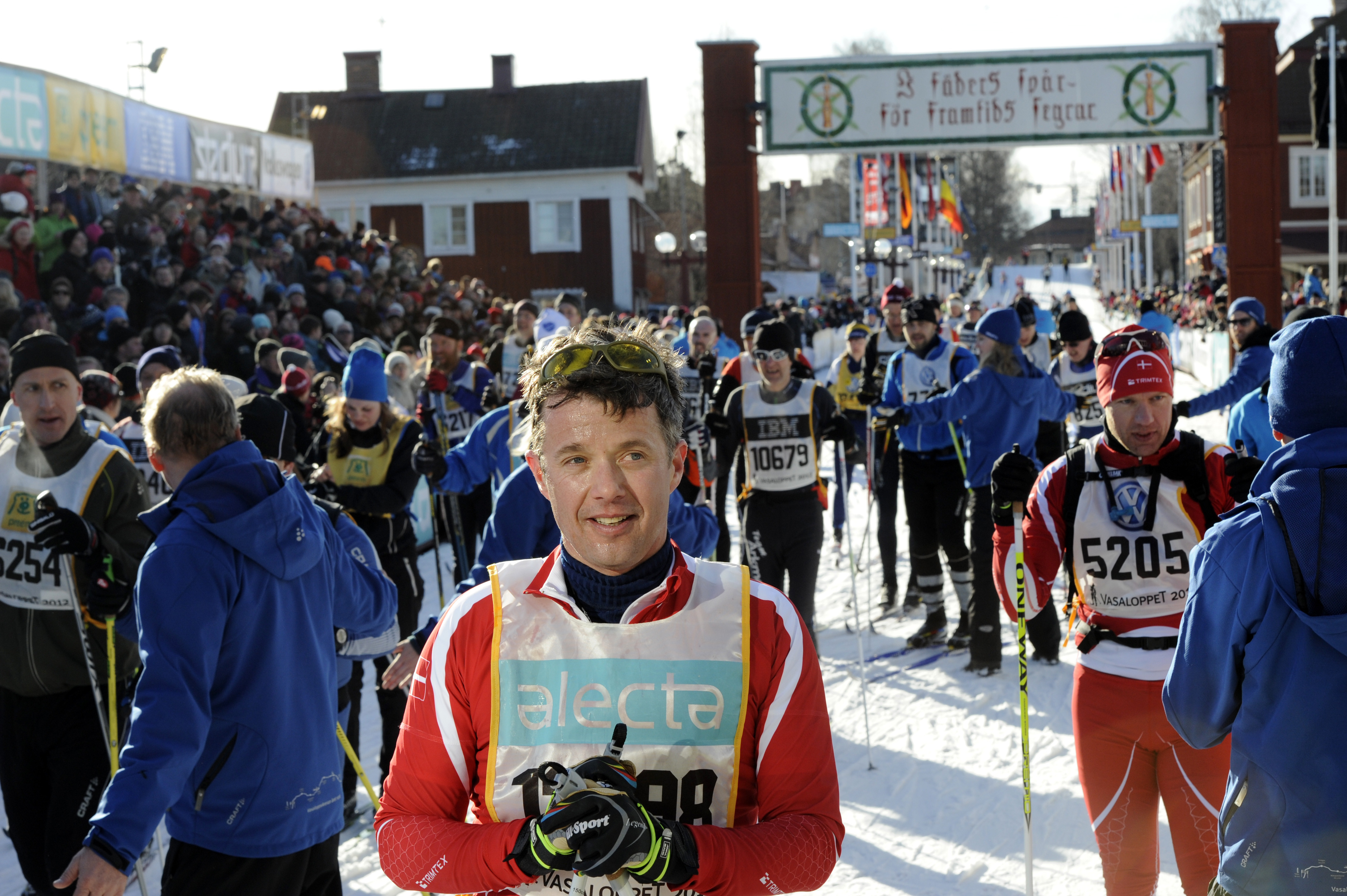
Prince Frederik of Denmark, 2012

Vasaloppet has been called a rite of passage for Swedes. Aside from the winners, some of the noted people who have completed the race are:

- Alice Bah Kuhnke, former minister of culture.
- Carl XVI Gustaf, King of Sweden (3 times).
- Carl Philip, Prince of Sweden.
- Magdalena Forsberg, former biathlon champion.
- Peter Forsberg, ice hockey player.
- Frederik X, King of Denmark.
- Marcus Grönholm, rally driver.
- Mark Levengood, journalist, writer.
- Ueli Maurer, Swiss defence minister.
- Anna Westerberg, Swedish rail regulator.
- Pippa Middleton, socialite.
- James William Middleton, businessman.
- Arild Monsen, cross-country skier.
- Rickard Olsson, television and radio presenter.
- Anja Pärson, alpine skier.
- Åsa Romson, politician
- Olaf Tufte, competition rower
- Lassi Karonen, competition rower.
- Frida Wallberg, boxer.
- Måns Zelmerlöw, Eurovision winner.
- Robin Bryntesson, cross-country skier.
- Filip Dikmen, comedian.
- Gunde Svan, cross-country skier.

== See also ==
- Finlandia-hiihto
- List of Swedish sportspeople
- Skiing
- Tjejvasan
- Tourism in Sweden
