= Tjejvasan =

Women's cross-country skiing competition in Sweden

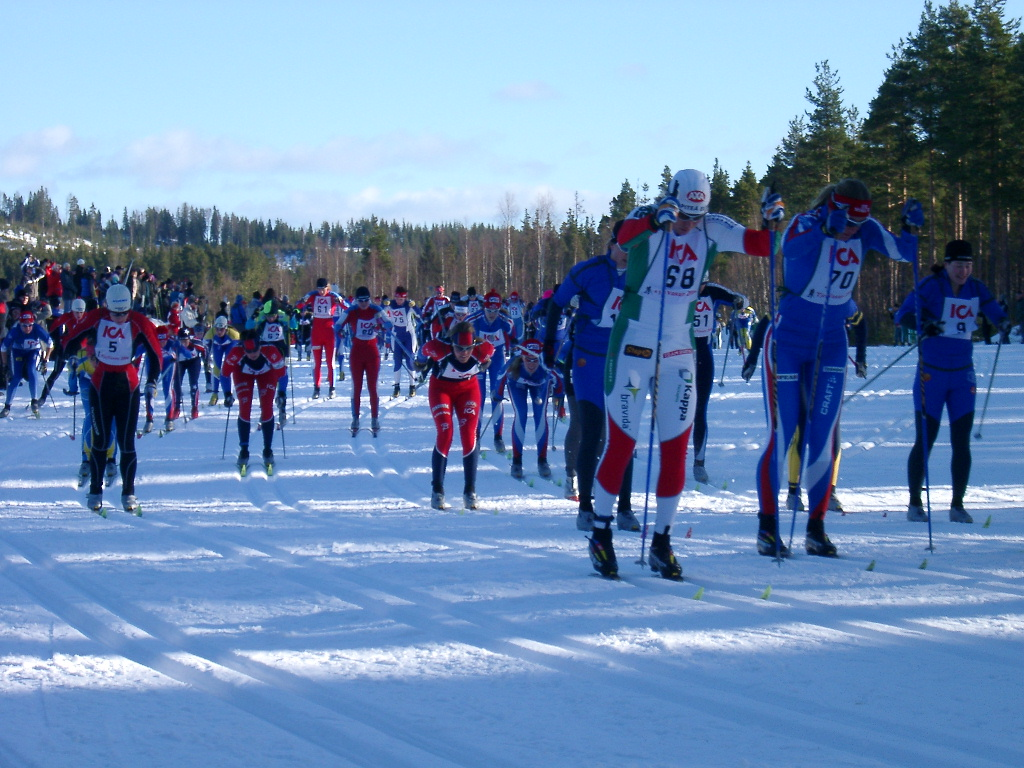
- Tjejvasan 2006.
- Status: active
- Genre: sporting event
- Date: February
- Frequency: annual
- Location: Oxberg-Mora
- Country: Sweden
- Inaugurated: 1988

Tjejvasan is a cross-country skiing event in Sweden, running from Oxberg to Mora, a distance of 30 kilometers. It is only open to female skiers. Being annual, the first event was first held in 1988.

== Winners ==
Winners throughout the years.

- 1988 – Karin Värnlund, IFK Mora
- 1989 – Marie Johansson, Dala Järna IK
- 1990 – cancelled because of lack of snow
- 1991 – Anna Frithioff, Kvarnsvedens GoIF
- 1992 – Anna Frithioff, Kvarnsvedens GoIF
- 1993 – Carina Görlin, Hudiksvalls IF
- 1994 – Marie-Helene Östlund, Hudiksvalls IF
- 1995 – Marie-Helene Östlund, Hudiksvalls IF
- 1996 – Kerrin Petty, IFK Mora
- 1997 – Kerrin Petty, Stockviks SF
- 1998 – Bente Martinsen, Norway
- 1999 – Elin Ek, Bergeforsens SK
- 2000 – Annika Evaldsson, IFK Mora
- 2001 – Anita Moen, Norway
- 2002 – Emelie Öhrstig, Stockviks SF
- 2003 – Ulrica Persson, SK Bore
- 2004 – Hilde Gjermundshaug Pedersen, Norway
- 2005 – Sofia Bleckur, IK Jarl
- 2006 – Elin Ek, IFK Mora
- 2007 – Susanne Nyström, Piteå Elit SK
- 2008 – Susanne Nyström, Piteå Elit SK
- 2009 – Susanne Nyström, Piteå Elit SK
- 2010 – Susanne Nyström, IFK Mora
- 2011 – Jenny Hansson, Östersunds SK
- 2012 – Susanne Nyström, Laisvalls SK
- 2013 – Susanne Nyström, Laisvalls SK
- 2014 – Sofia Bleckur, IFK Mora
- 2015 – Laila Kveli, Norway
- 2016 – Britta Johansson Norgren, Sollefteå SK
- 2017 – Britta Johansson Norgren, Sollefteå SK
- 2018 – Kateřina Smutná, Czech Republic
- 2019 – Britta Johansson Norgren, Sollefteå SK
- 2020 – Britta Johansson Norgren, Sollefteå Skidor IF
- 2021 – Lina Korsgren, Åre LSK
- 2022 – Britta Johansson Norgren, Sollefteå Skidor IF
- 2023 – Ida Dahl, Team Engcon
- 2024 – Kati Roivas, Finland
- 2025 – Jenny Larsson, Lager 157
- 2026 – Johanna Hagström, Sweden

== See also ==
- Tjejmilen
- Tjejtrampet
- Vasaloppet
