= Lars-Arne Bölling =

Swedish cross-country skier

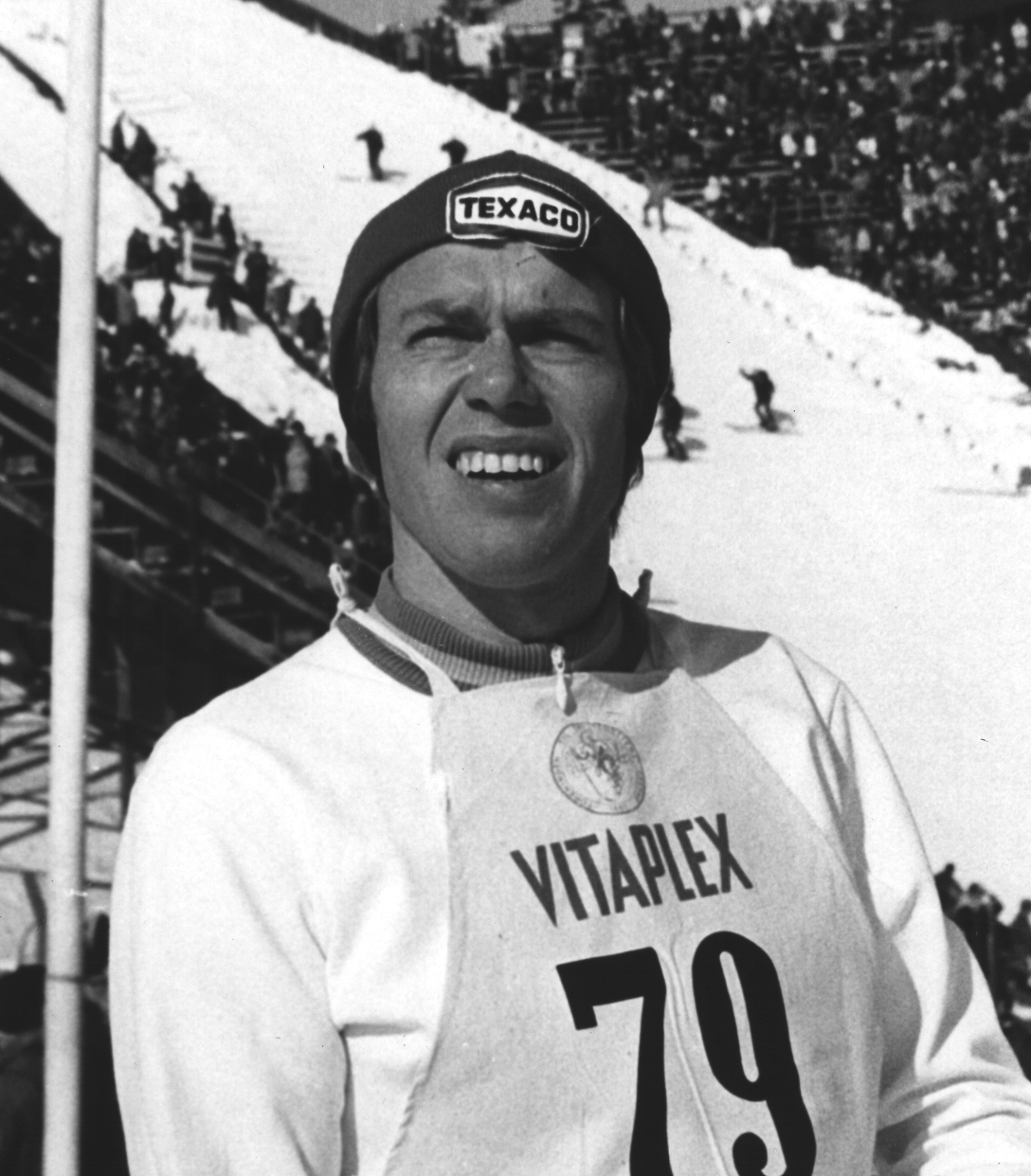

Personal information
- Born: 6 October 1944 Sörsjön, Sweden

Sport
- Sport: Skiing
- Club: IFK Mora, Orsa IF

Lars-Arne Bölling, born Lars Arne Torsten 6 October 1944 in Sörsjön, Sweden, is a Swedish former cross-country skier competing for IFK Mora and Orsa IF at club level. He won Vasaloppet in 1970 and 1972. He became Swedish national champion in the 15 kilometers race in 1970, and in the 1973 30 kilometers race as well as the 1970 and 1971 50 kilometers races. He was also part of the IFK Mora team winning the Swedish national relay championship in 1970–1973, and in 1974 he won the same relay title with Orsa IF.

In 1970, he was awarded the Sixten Jernberg Award. and he also represented Sweden during the Olympic Winter Games of 1972 in Sapporo, where he ended up 9th in the 50 kilometers race. In 1973 he won the Marcialonga race in Italy.

He is the son Arne Bölling, who ended up second at Vasaloppet 1943, and the brother's son of Stig Bölling.

== Cross-country skiing results ==
=== Olympic Games ===
Year	Age	15 km	30 km	50 km	4 × 10 km relay
1972	27	—	—	7	—
