= Verner Lundström =

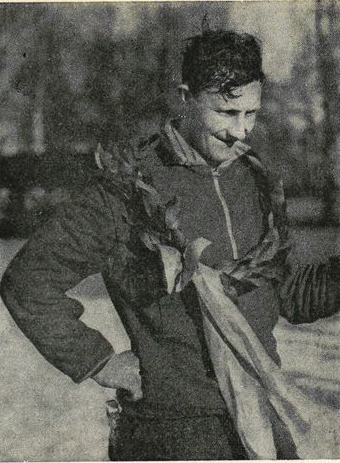
- Verner Lundström in 1930

Personal information
- Born: 30 January 1901 Arvidsjaur, Sweden
- Died: 18 October 1983 (aged 82) Glommersträsk, Sweden

Sport
- Sport: Skiing

Verner Lundström (born 30 January 1901 in Arvidsjaur, Sweden; died 18 October 1983 in Glommersträsk, Sweden) was a Swedish cross-country skier. He won Vasaloppet in 1930.
