= Johan Persson =

Johan Persson may refer to:

- Johan Persson (photographer) (born 1982), Swedish photographer
- Johan Persson (footballer) (born 1984), Swedish footballer
- Johan Persson (ice hockey) (born 1990), Swedish ice hockey player
- Johan Abram Persson (1898–1971), Swedish cross-country skier, fisherman, craftsman and wolfhunter

== See also ==
- Johan Pehrson (born 1968), Swedish politician
