= Sandra Hansson =

Swedish cross-country skier

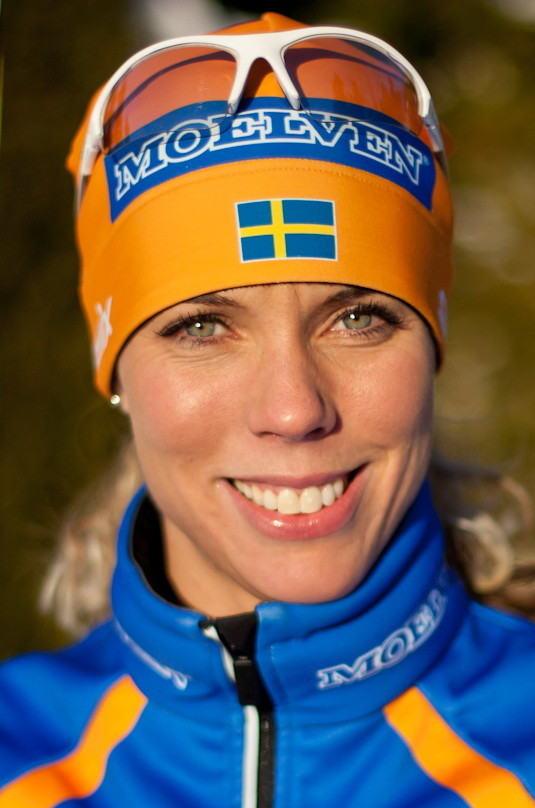

Personal information
- Nationality: Sweden
- Born: April 2, 1980 (age 46) Bäckefors, Sweden

Sport
- Sport: Skiing
- Club: Uddevalla IS, Strindheim IL
Medal record
Women's cross-country skiing
Representing Sweden
Junior World Championships
Gold medal – first place	2000 ŠtrbskévPleso	4 × 5 km relay

Sandra Hansson (born 2 April 1980) is a Swedish cross-country skier. In 2008 and 2009, she won the women's main Vasaloppet event. She has also been successful in roller skiing.
