= Elias Edström =

Swedish ice hockey player

- Born: April 19, 1995 (age 30); Glommersträsk, Sweden
- Height: 6 ft 0 in (183 cm)
- Weight: 187 lb (85 kg; 13 st 5 lb)
- Position: Forward
- Shot: Left
- Played for: Skellefteå AIK
- Playing career: 2014–2023

Elias Edström (born April 19, 1995) is a Swedish former professional ice hockey player.

Edström made his Swedish Hockey League debut playing with Skellefteå AIK during the 2014–15 SHL season.
