= Frykberg =

Frykberg is a Swedish surname. Notable people with the surname include:

- Lasse Frykberg (born 1957), Swedish cross-country skier
- Nils Frykberg (1888–1966), Swedish runner
- Susan Frykberg (1954–2023), New Zealand electroacoustic composer and sound artist
