= Bengt Hassis =

Swedish cross-country skier (born 1957)

Personal information
- Born: 11 January 1957

Sport
- Sport: Skiing
- Club: Orsa IF

Bengt Hassis, born 11 January 1957, is a Swedish former cross-country skier. He represented Orsa IF at club level. In 1985 and 1986, he won Vasaloppet. During his 1986 victory, he broke the Vasaloppet record, which lasted until 1998, when it was broken by Peter Göransson.

Bengt Hassis is now a cross-country skiing instructor in Grönklitt. He is the brother of Swedish cross-country skier Ola Hassis.
