= Gösta Andersson =

Gösta Andersson may refer to:

- Gösta Andersson (wrestler) (1917–1975), Swedish wrestler
- Gösta Andersson (skier) (1918–1979), Swedish skier and winner of Vasaloppet
- Gösta Andersson (footballer), Swedish footballer
