= Anders Blomquist =

Anders Blomquist may refer to:

- Anders Blomquist (cross-country skier) (born 1960), Swedish cross-country skier
- Anders Blomquist (footballer) (born 1977), Swedish footballer

== See also ==
- Anders Blomqvist (born 1949), Swedish professor of pain research
