= Henrik Eriksson =

Henrik Eriksson may refer to:

- Henrik Eriksson (ice hockey) (born 1990), professional Swedish ice hockey player
- Henrik Eriksson (cross-country skier) (born 1974), Swedish former cross-country skier
