= Siitonen =

Siitonen is a Finnish surname. Notable people with the surname include:

- Eva-Riitta Siitonen (born 1940), Finnish politician
- Hannu Siitonen (born 1949), Finnish javelin thrower
- Pauli Siitonen (born 1938), Finnish cross-country skier
- Fredi (singer), stage name of the Finnish comedic actor, musician, singer/songwriter and television presenter Matti Kalevi Siitonen (1942–2021)
- Stig (singer), stage name of the Finnish singer Pasi Siitonen (born 1978)
