= Sune Larsson =

Swedish cross-country skier (1930–2026)

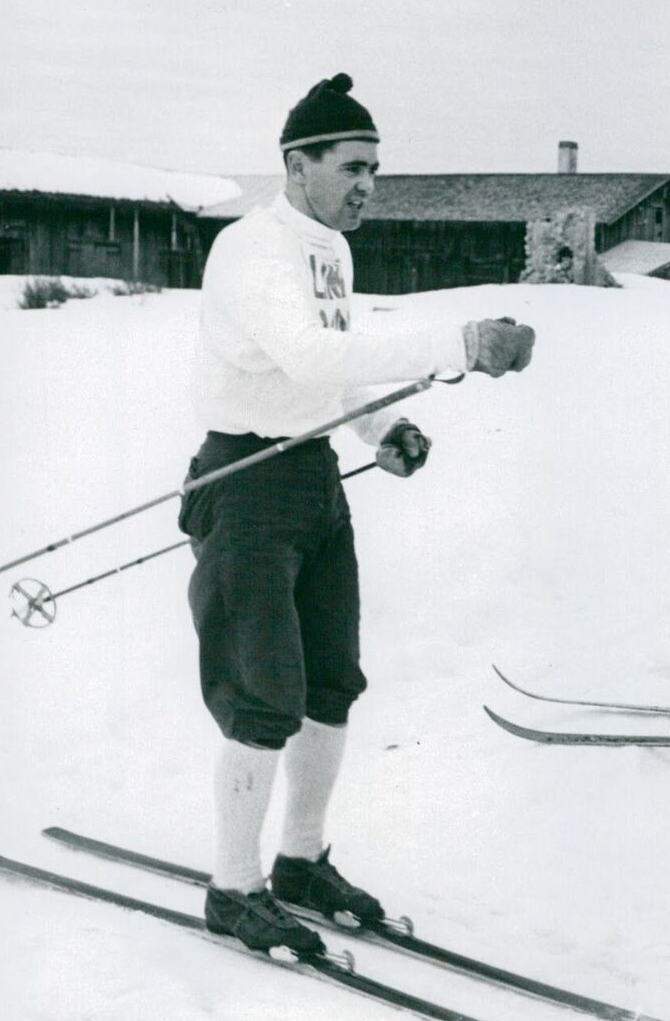
- Larsson at the 1961 Vasaloppet

Personal information
- Born: 21 June 1930 Oxberg, Sweden
- Died: 31 May 2026 (aged 95)

Sport
- Sport: Cross-country skiing
- Club: IFK Mora
Medal record
Representing Sweden
World Championships
Bronze medal – third place	1954 Falun	4 × 10 km

Sune Larsson (21 June 1930 – 31 May 2026) was a Swedish cross-country skier. He earned a bronze medal in the 4 × 10 km relay at the 1954 FIS Nordic World Ski Championships in Falun, Sweden. In 1959, he won the Vasaloppet. He was part of Swedish team reserve at the 1956 and 1960 Winter Olympics.

Larsson was born in Oxberg, Sweden on 21 June 1930. He died on 31 May 2026, at the age of 95. His younger brother Hans-Erik Larsson competed in cross-country skiing at the 1972 Olympics.
