= Olle Wiklund =

Swedish cross-country skier

Personal information
- Born: 26 December 1914 Bergvik, Sweden
- Died: 31 December 1999 (aged 85) Bergvik, Sweden

Sport
- Sport: Skiing
- Club: IFK Bergvik

Olle Wiklund (1914-1999) was a Swedish cross-country skier. In 1942, he won Vasaloppet., nine minutes before second-placed Bertil Melin, breaking the old Vasaloppet record, dated back to 1928, with two minutes.

Competing for IFK Bergvik at club level, he participated in Vasaloppet at some points.
