= Ulrica Persson =

Swedish cross-country skier

Personal information
- Full name: Anna Ulrica Persson
- Nationality: Sweden
- Born: 7 March 1975

Sport
- Sport: Skiing
- Club: Sunne SK

World Cup career
- Seasons: 8 – (1999, 2001–2007)
- Indiv. starts: 19
- Indiv. podiums: 0
- Team starts: 7
- Team podiums: 0
- Overall titles: 0 – (100th in 2004)
- Discipline titles: 0

Ulrica Persson, born 7 March 1975, is a Swedish cross-country skier. She won the women's main competition of Vasaloppet in 2001 and 2003. In 2003, she also won Tjejvasan. She also competed in the women's 30 kilometre classical at the 2002 Winter Olympics.

== Cross-country skiing results ==
All results are sourced from the International Ski Federation (FIS).

=== Olympic Games ===
Year	Age	10 km	15 km	Pursuit	30 km	Sprint	4 × 5 km relay
2002	23	—	—	—	DNF	—	—

=== World Cup ===
==== Season standings ====
Season	Age	Discipline standings				Ski Tour standings
Season	Age	Overall	Distance	Long Distance	Sprint	Tour de Ski
1999	24	NC	—N/a	NC	—	—N/a
2001	26	NC	—N/a	—N/a	—	—N/a
2002	27	NC	—N/a	—N/a	—	—N/a
2003	28	101	—N/a	—N/a	—	—N/a
2004	29	100	80	—N/a	—	—N/a
2005	30	NC	NC	—N/a	—	—N/a
2006	31	107	76	—N/a	—	—N/a
2007	32	NC	NC	—N/a	—	—
