= Kateřina Smutná =

Czech, later Austrian, cross-country skier

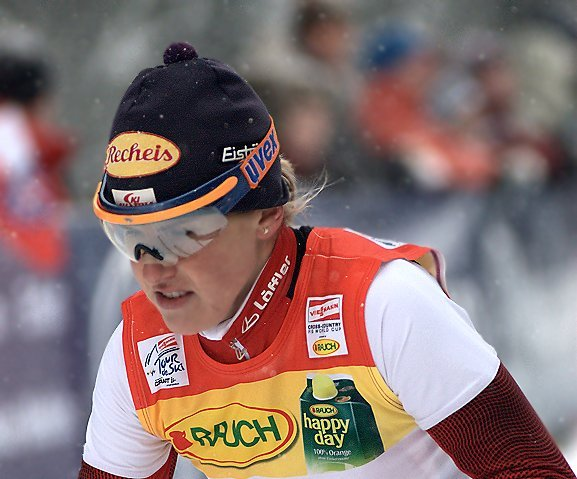
- Smutná in 2010

Personal information
- Nationality: Czech Republic
- Born: 13 June 1983 (age 43) Jablonec nad Nisou, Czechoslovakia
- Height: 1.71 m (5 ft 7 in)

Sport
- Sport: Skiing
- Club: HSV Saalfelden

World Cup career
- Seasons: 11 – (2003, 2007–2015, 2017)
- Indiv. starts: 171
- Indiv. podiums: 0
- Team starts: 4
- Team podiums: 0
- Overall titles: 0 – (24th in 2009, 2013)
- Discipline titles: 0

Kateřina Smutná (born 13 June 1983) is a Czech national ski team member and a former Austrian cross-country skier.

== Personal life ==
Smutná grew up in Jablonec and after trying modern gymnastics became a member of ski club in the same town.

== Career ==
=== For the Czech Republic ===
Smutná achieved many success and titles of national champion in younger and junior categories in cross-country skiing as well as rollerski in the summer.

In 2002, Smutná finished 13th at the World Junior Championships. A year later in 2003, she competed in Val di Fiemme as a member of the Czech national cross country team. After an unsatisfying result, she was accused by the head coach of sabotaging the race and was sacked from the national team. This was followed by several incidents and conflicts which she attributed to an inflexible and old-fashioned management system. She last competed for the Czech Republic in 2005.

In March 2016, she won Vasaloppet. and February 2018, she won Tjejvasan.

=== For Austria ===
In 2006, Smutná decided to change her citizenship and continue her sports career in Austria. Her best World Cup finish for Austrian national team was fourth in a sprint event at Whistler Olympic Park, Canada in January 2009. Smutná's best finish at the FIS Nordic World Ski Championships was 11th in the sprint event at Sapporo in 2007.

At the 2010 Winter Olympics in Vancouver, she finished 11th in the individual sprint, 29th in the 7.5 km + 7.5 km double pursuit, and 33rd in the 30 kilometres events.

== Cross-country skiing results ==
All results are sourced from the International Ski Federation (FIS).

=== Olympic Games ===
| Year | Age | 10 km individual | 15 km skiathlon | 30 km mass start | Sprint | 4 × 5 km relay | Team sprint |
|---|---|---|---|---|---|---|---|
| 2010 | 26 | — | 29 | 32 | 11 | — | — |
| 2014 | 30 | 20 | 45 | — | — | 12 | 8 |

=== World Championships ===
| Year | Age | 10 km | 15 km | Pursuit | 30 km | Sprint | 4 × 5 km relay | Team sprint |
|---|---|---|---|---|---|---|---|---|
| 2003 | 19 | 51 | — | — | — | — | — | —N/a |
| 2007 | 23 | — | —N/a | — | DNF | 11 | — | — |
| 2009 | 25 | 24 | —N/a | DNF | — | — | — | — |
| 2011 | 26 | 15 | —N/a | — | — | 36 | — | 36 |
| 2013 | 27 | — | —N/a | 18 | — | 13 | 11 | 16 |
| 2015 | 29 | — | —N/a | — | — | 31 | — | — |
| 2017 | 31 | 31 | —N/a | — | — | — | 11 | — |

=== World Cup ===
==== Season standings ====
| Season | Age | Discipline standings | | | Ski Tour standings | | |
| Season | Age | Overall | Distance | Sprint | Nordic Opening | Tour de Ski | World Cup Final |
|---|---|---|---|---|---|---|---|
| 2003 | 19 | NC | —N/a | NC | —N/a | —N/a | —N/a |
| 2007 | 23 | 41 | 42 | 30 | —N/a | DNF | —N/a |
| 2008 | 24 | 39 | 41 | 31 | —N/a | 27 | 33 |
| 2009 | 25 | 24 | 24 | 13 | —N/a | 23 | 35 |
| 2010 | 26 | 38 | 48 | 19 | —N/a | DNF | 33 |
| 2011 | 27 | 43 | 36 | 30 | 37 | DNF | DNF |
| 2012 | 28 | 33 | 38 | 27 | 22 | 33 | DNF |
| 2013 | 29 | 24 | 32 | 15 | 14 | DNF | 35 |
| 2014 | 30 | 41 | 30 | 34 | 19 | DNF | DNF |
| 2015 | 31 | 88 | 59 | NC | — | — | —N/a |
| 2017 | 33 | NC | NC | — | — | — | — |
