= Vasaloppet Japan =

Vasalopet Japan
- Status: active
- Genre: sporting event
- Date: February
- Frequency: annual
- Locations: Asahikawa, Hokkaido
- Country: Japan
- Inaugurated: 1981
- Website: www.ahmic21.ne.jp/asahikawa-sports/vasaloppet.html

Vasaloppet Japan is a cross-country skiing event held around Asahikawa on the island of Hokkaido in northern Japan. The event has been held since 1981 and was named after Vasaloppet in Sweden.
