= Daniel Tynell =

Swedish cross-country skier

Personal information
- Nationality: Sweden
- Born: January 6, 1976 (age 50) Grycksbo, Sweden

Sport
- Sport: Skiing

World Cup career
- Seasons: 2 – (2004, 2006)
- Indiv. starts: 2
- Indiv. podiums: 1
- Indiv. wins: 1
- Team starts: 0
- Overall titles: 0 – (55th in 2006)
- Discipline titles: 0

Daniel Tynell (born 6 January 1976 in Grycksbo, Dalarna) is a Swedish retired cross-country skier who won the ski marathon Vasaloppet three times, in 2002, 2006 and 2009, and came in second in the 2010, 2011 and 2013 marathons. Tynell also won the König Ludwig Lauf, an event that is part of Worldloppet Ski Federation, twice. He represented the ski club Grycksbo IF.

In March 2015, Tynell had a heart attack which prevented him from participating in that year's Vasaloppet. Shortly thereafter, he announced that he was retiring from skiing due to his heart problems.

== Cross-country skiing results ==
All results are sourced from the International Ski Federation (FIS).

=== World Cup ===
==== Season standings ====
Season	Age			
Season	Age	Overall	Distance	Sprint
2004	28	111	71	—
2006	30	55	35	—

==== Individual podiums ====
- 1 victory
- 1 podium

No.	Season	Date	Location	Race	Level	Place
1	2005–06	5 March 2006	Vasaloppet, Sweden	90 km Mass Start C	World Cup	1st
