= Sigfrid Mattsson =

Swedish cross-country skier

Personal information
- Born: 19 September 1917
- Died: 27 August 2009 (aged 91)

Sport
- Sport: Skiing
- Club: Skarpnäcks IF

Sigfrid Mattsson (1917 - 2009) was a Swedish cross-country skier. Representing Skarpnäcks IF in club competitions, he won Vasaloppet in 1952.
