= Håkan Westin =

Swedish cross-country skier

Personal information
- Born: July 21, 1964 Ed Parish, Sweden

Sport
- Sport: Skiing

Håkan Westin, born 21 July 1964 in Ed Parish, Sweden, is a Swedish former cross-country skier. He has won Vasaloppet two times: in 1993 and 1996. He is also, 15 generations backwards in time, ancestor of Gustav Vasa.

Håkan Westin is the brother of Swedish cross-country skier Marie-Helene Östlund.
