= Margit Nordin =

Swedish gymnastics director and first woman to compete in the Vasaloppet (1897-1982)

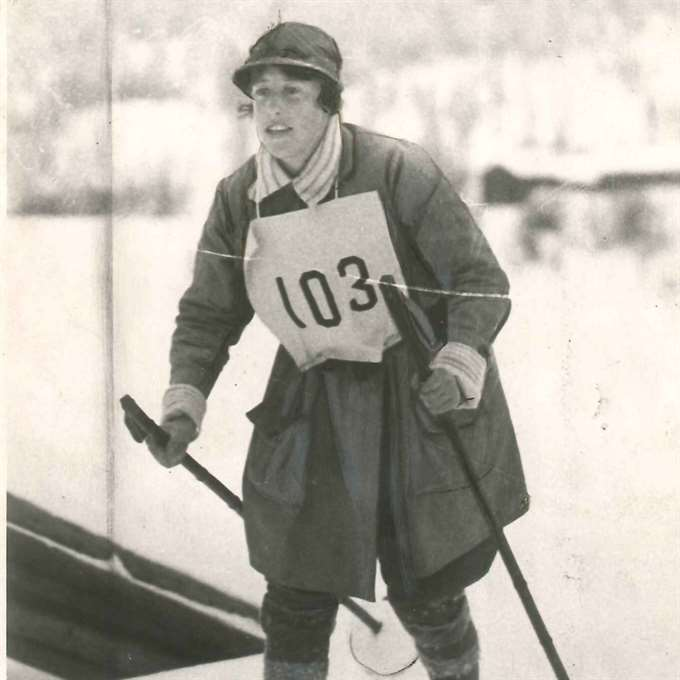
- Nordin, at the 1923 Vasaloppet
- Born: Ellen Margit Ingrid Nordin; August 10, 1897; Karlstad, Sweden
- Died: May 3, 1982 (aged 84); Saltsjöbaden

Ellen Margit Ingrid Nordin, (August 10, 1897 - May 3,1982), was a Swedish gymnastics director and the first woman to compete in the Vasaloppet, which she did in 1923. She later lived in Grängesberg and competed during the race for IFK Grängesberg in southern Dalarna. After the race, female participants in the Vasaloppet were banned, a ban that only ended in 1981.

== Biography ==
Margit Nordin was the daughter of lecturer Richard Nordin (1867–1929), from Uppsala, and his wife Elin Maria, née Runström (1869–1960), from Västerås. Between 1924 and 1930 she was married to lawyer Nils Sundell; his father Carl Reinhold Sundell performed the couple's marriage in Uppsala Cathedral on July 19, 1924.

Nordin worked as a physical education teacher and physiotherapist in Grängesberg. One winter she had a patient 15 km away, which for a long time meant daily skiing trips of 30 km per day. She was also used to day hikes/training marches of 40 to 60 kilometres. This gave Nordin the idea to test whether her fitness was also good enough for a full Vasaloppet, which had its first race in 1922.

=== The 1923 Vasaloppet and its aftermath ===
At six o'clock on the morning of March 4, 1923, the starting field was released, 160 men and one woman in total. Nordin wore the number 103. Apart from a meal break and a 15-minute rest at a farm near Mångsbodarna, she was on the run the whole time. Nordin crossed the finish line after 10 hours, 9 minutes and 42 seconds.

She was seen as a bold woman looking for a challenge and caused some excitement during and after the race. After Nordin's finish, people had cheered for this first woman in the race, even though she finished after all the male participants (except the three who had dropped out).

In the spring of 1923, after the race. the Vasaloppet organizers decided to ban women from participating with the support of the rules of the Swedish Ski Association, not allowing women to participate in distances longer than 10 km and it was until 1980 that there was a total ban on women participating in the race.

In 1981, however, the rules were changed. Women were again allowed to run, and the second official woman to finish the Vasaloppet was Meeri Bodelid with a time of 5:28.08. Between Nordin and Bodelid, however, several women using male names and disguised as men had raced the Vasaloppet during the 56 years of prohibition, notably Birgitta Westhed, who had been identified in a TV interview at the track in 1978, which put pressure on the organizers to allow women. Since 1997, there has been an official award for the best female skier.

On August 10, 2023, over 100 years after she skied the Vasaloppet, Margit Nordin was honored with a Google Doodle on her 126th birthday.
