= Lasse Frykberg =

Swedish cross-country skier

Lars Frykberg
Personal information
- Born: 3 January 1957

Sport
- Sport: Skiing
- Club: IFK Mora

Lars Frykberg (born 3 January 1957) is a Swedish former cross-country skier. He won Vasaloppet in 1982, while competing for IFK Mora in a competition where Jean-Paul Pierrat from France first reached the finish, but was disqualified for changing skis (which was not allowed).

He also won Worldloppet in the seasons of 1981/1982 and 1982/1983.
