= Konrad Pettersson =

Personal information
- Born: 1 July 1903
- Died: 18 November 1976 (aged 73)

Sport
- Sport: Skiing
- Club: Luleå SK

Konrad Pettersson (1 July 1903 in Älvsbyn, Sweden – 18 November 1976 in Piteå, Sweden), was a Swedish cross-country skier. He won Vasaloppet in 1927. He represented Luleå SK in club competitions.
