= Anders Blomquist (cross-country skier) =

Swedish cross-country skier

Personal information
- Nationality: Sweden
- Born: 17 October 1960 Bromma, Sweden

Sport
- Sport: Skiing
- Club: IFK Lidingö, Åsarna IK

Anders Blomquist (born 17 October 1960 in Bromma, Sweden) is a Swedish former cross-country skier, competing for IFK Lidingö and Åsarna IK at club level. In 1988, he shared the Vasaloppet victory together with his brother Örjan Blomquist. For many years, he has been an SVT commentator during skiing events. Until March 2010, he was the CEO for Destination Funäsdalen.
