= Ola Hassis =

Personal information
- Born: 22 March 1951

Sport
- Sport: Skiing
- Club: Orsa IF

Ola Hassis, born 22 March 1951, is a Swedish former cross-country skier, competing for Orsa IF at club level. He won Vasaloppet in 1979. He is the brother of Swedish cross-country skier Bengt Hassis.
