= Elias Nilsson =

Swedish cross-country skier

Personal information
- Born: 4 January 1910 Stugun, Sweden
- Died: 9 November 2001 (aged 91) Lit, Sweden

Sport
- Sport: Skiing

Elias Nilsson (born 1 April 1910 in Stugun, Sweden, died 9 November 2001 in Lit, Sweden) was a Swedish cross-country skier. In 1938, he won the Vasaloppet.
