= Pekka Kuvaja =

Personal information
- Born: 15 June 1921
- Died: 21 November 2003 (aged 82)

Sport
- Sport: cross-country skiing

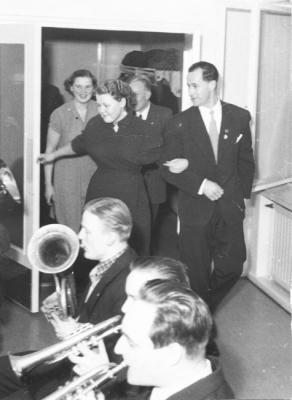
Pekka Kuvaja and his wife in March 1954

Armas Petter "Pekka" Kuvaja (15 June 1921, Heinävesi, Finland – 21 November 2003 in Tampere, Finland) was a Finnish cross-country skier who competed in the late 1940s and early 1950s.

He was born in Heinävesi and died in Tampere.

In the 50 km event at the Winter Olympics, he finished seventh in 1948 and ninth in 1952. Also, in 1954, he became the first non-Swede to finish first in the Vasaloppet.

== Cross-country skiing results ==
=== Olympic Games ===
| Year | Age | 18 km | 50 km | 4 × 10 km relay |
|---|---|---|---|---|
| 1948 | 26 | — | 7 | — |
| 1952 | 30 | — | 9 | — |
