= Sofia Lind =

Swedish cross-country skier

Personal information
- Full name: Anna Sofia Lind
- Nationality: Sweden
- Born: September 4, 1975 (age 50)

Sport
- Sport: Skiing
- Club: Åsarna IK

World Cup career
- Seasons: 6 – (1999–2001, 2003–2005)
- Indiv. starts: 10
- Indiv. podiums: 0
- Team starts: 3
- Team podiums: 0
- Overall titles: 0
- Discipline titles: 0

Sofia Lind (born 4 September 1975) is a Swedish cross-country skier. She won the women's race at the Vasaloppet four times, in 1997, 1999, 2004 and 2005. She also had the best time among the women in 1996, but prior to 1997, there was no official women's championship.

== Cross-country skiing results ==
All results are sourced from the International Ski Federation (FIS).

=== World Cup ===
==== Season standings ====
Season	Age					
Season	Age	Overall	Distance	Long Distance	Middle Distance	Sprint
1999	23	NC	—N/a	NC	—N/a	—
2000	24	NC	—N/a	—	NC	—
2001	25	NC	—N/a	—N/a	—N/a	—
2003	27	NC	—N/a	—N/a	—N/a	—
2004	28	NC	NC	—N/a	—N/a	—
2005	29	NC	NC	—N/a	—N/a	—
