= Hallenbarter =

Hallenbarter is a surname. Notable people with the surname include:

- Konrad Hallenbarter (born 1953), Swiss cross country skier
- Simon Hallenbarter (born 1979), Swiss biathlete
