= Dalkulla =

Swedish dialectal name for an unmarried woman

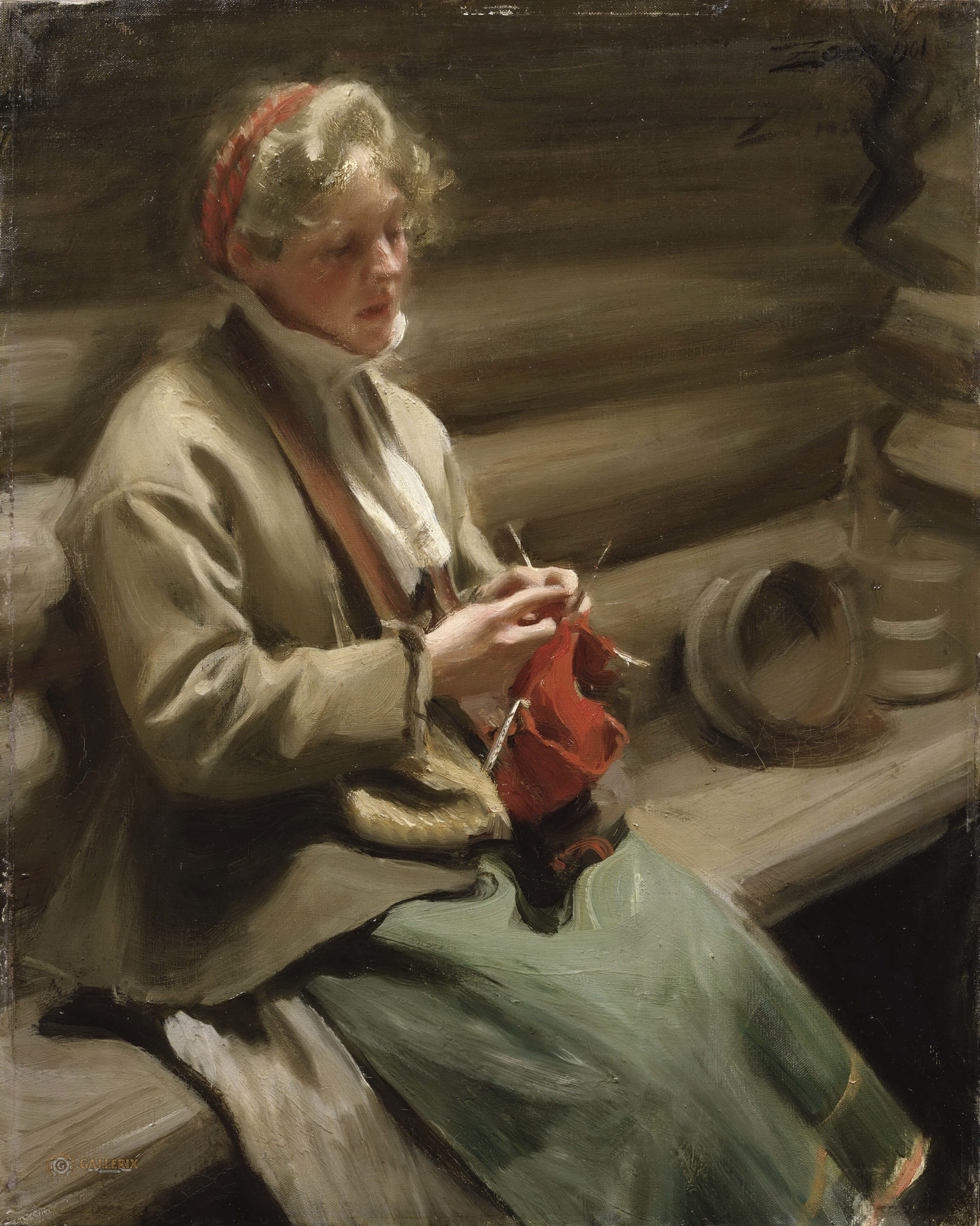
A kulla knitting, painting by Anders Zorn, 1901.

Kulla (plural kullor) is an older dialectal name for an unmarried woman, used often in most region of Sweden in the vicinity of Dalarna, but in present time mostly used as a term for a woman from Dalarna ("dalkulla").

In the oldest known source from 1640, kulla is synonymous with "woman." An older, unmarried woman is referred to as gammkulla, while a married woman is referred to as käring.

The male equivalent is dalkarl or mas.

== See also ==
- Kranskulla
- Dalkarl
