= Alfred Lif =

Swedish cross-country skier (1908–1980)

Personal information
- Born: 26 March 1908
- Died: 16 May 1980 (aged 72)

Sport
- Sport: Skiing

Alfred Lif (26 March 1908 – 16 May 1980) was a Swedish cross-country skier. He won the Swedish 50 kilometers national championship in 1935. and in 1939 he won Vasaloppet.

Also competing in alpine skiing, he participated in the 1937 Swedish national championships.
