= Matti Kuosku =

Swedish cross-country skier

Personal information
- Born: 4 March 1941 Pelkosenniemi, Lapland, Finland
- Died: 22 April 2012 (aged 71) Gävle, Sweden

Sport
- Sport: Skiing

Matti Kuosku (4 March 1941 – 22 April 2012) was a Swedish cross-country skier. He competed in the 50 km event at the 1976 Winter Olympics. Kuosku was a Sweden Finn, and he had moved to Sweden in the late 1960s. In 1974 and 1976, he won Vasaloppet.

== Cross-country skiing results ==
=== Olympic Games ===
Year	Age	15 km	30 km	50 km	4 × 10 km relay
1976	34	—	—	19	—
