= Hans-Erik Larsson =

Swedish cross-country skier

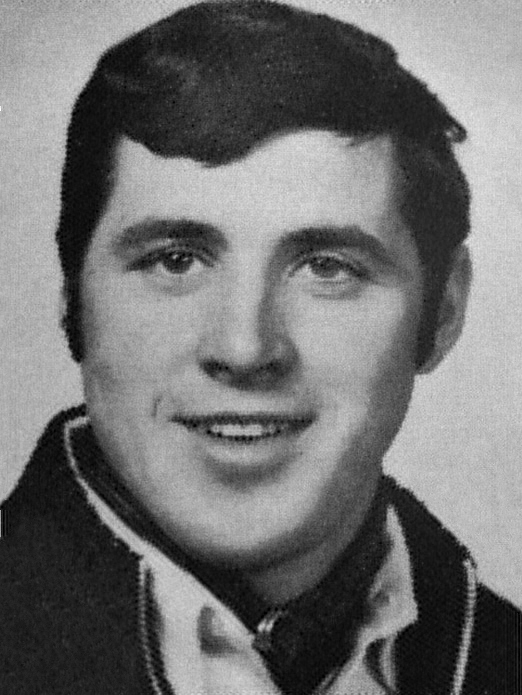

Personal information
- Nationality: Swedish
- Born: 2 April 1947 (age 78); Mora Municipality, Sweden

Sport
- Sport: Cross-country skiing
- Club: IFK Mora

Hans-Erik Larsson (born 2 April 1947) is a Swedish cross-country skier. He finished 11th in the 50 km race at the 1972 Winter Olympics.

His brother Sune Larsson won a bronze medal in cross-country skiing at the 1954 World Championships.
