= Staffan Larsson =

Personal information
- Full name: Bogg Erik Staffan Larsson
- Nationality: Sweden
- Born: 10 February 1970 (age 56)

Sport
- Sport: Skiing
- Club: IFK Mora SK

World Cup career
- Seasons: 9 – (1995–2003)
- Indiv. starts: 20
- Indiv. podiums: 0
- Team starts: 7
- Team podiums: 0
- Overall titles: 0 – (89th in 1995)
- Discipline titles: 0
- Updated on 3 April 2019

Staffan Larsson (born 10 February 1970) is a Swedish former cross-country skier.

Larsson competed at an elite level from 1992 to 2005. He took part in the Vasaloppet on numerous occasions, and finished second in 1998 after a late finish from Peter Göransson. Larsson took revenge a year later (1999) when he won the Vasaloppet.

== Cross-country skiing results ==
All results are sourced from the International Ski Federation (FIS).

=== World Cup ===
==== Season standings ====
Season	Age					
Season	Age	Overall	Distance	Long Distance	Middle Distance	Sprint
1995	25	89	—N/a	—N/a	—N/a	—N/a
1996	26	NC	—N/a	—N/a	—N/a	—N/a
1997	27	NC	—N/a	NC	—N/a	—
1998	28	NC	—N/a	NC	—N/a	—
1999	29	NC	—N/a	NC	—N/a	—
2000	30	95	—N/a	53	NC	—
2001	31	NC	—N/a	—N/a	—N/a	—
2002	32	NC	—N/a	—N/a	—N/a	—
2003	33	NC	—N/a	—N/a	—N/a	—
