= Örjan Blomquist =

Personal information
- Born: 23 August 1957 Bromma, Sweden
- Died: 30 July 2000 (aged 42)

Sport
- Sport: Skiing
- Club: IFK Lidingö

Örjan Blomquist (23 August 1957 – 30 July 2000) was a Swedish cross-country skier, specialised at long-distance races during the 1980s. Competing for IFK Lidingö at club level, he shared the victory at Vasaloppet 1988 together with his brother Anders Blomquist. Örjan Blomquist also won Worldloppet in 1985.

After the career, he worked as an SVT commentator during skiing events. Outside skiing, he was an economist. Örjan Blomquist died in the year 2000 due to cancer.
