= Botniavasan =

- Status: active
- Genre: sporting event
- Date: February
- Frequency: annual
- Location: Vörå
- Country: Finland
- Inaugurated: 2006
- Website: www.botniavasan.fi

Botniavasan is a cross-country skiing event held around Vörå in Finland. The event was first held in 2006, and is held in February each year. The main race is 50 km (31 mi) long, and the event has been named after Vasaloppet in Sweden.
