= Vasaloppet de la Sergerie =

- Status: active
- Genre: sporting event
- Date: March
- Frequency: annual
- Location: Quebec
- Country: Canada
- Inaugurated: 2007

Vasaloppet de la Sergerie is a cross-country skiing event held around Le Norvégien in the Quebec province in Canada. The event was first held in 2007.

Held in February or early March, the event is named after Vasaloppet in Sweden.
