= Gösta Andersson (skier) =

Swedish cross-country skier (1918–1979)

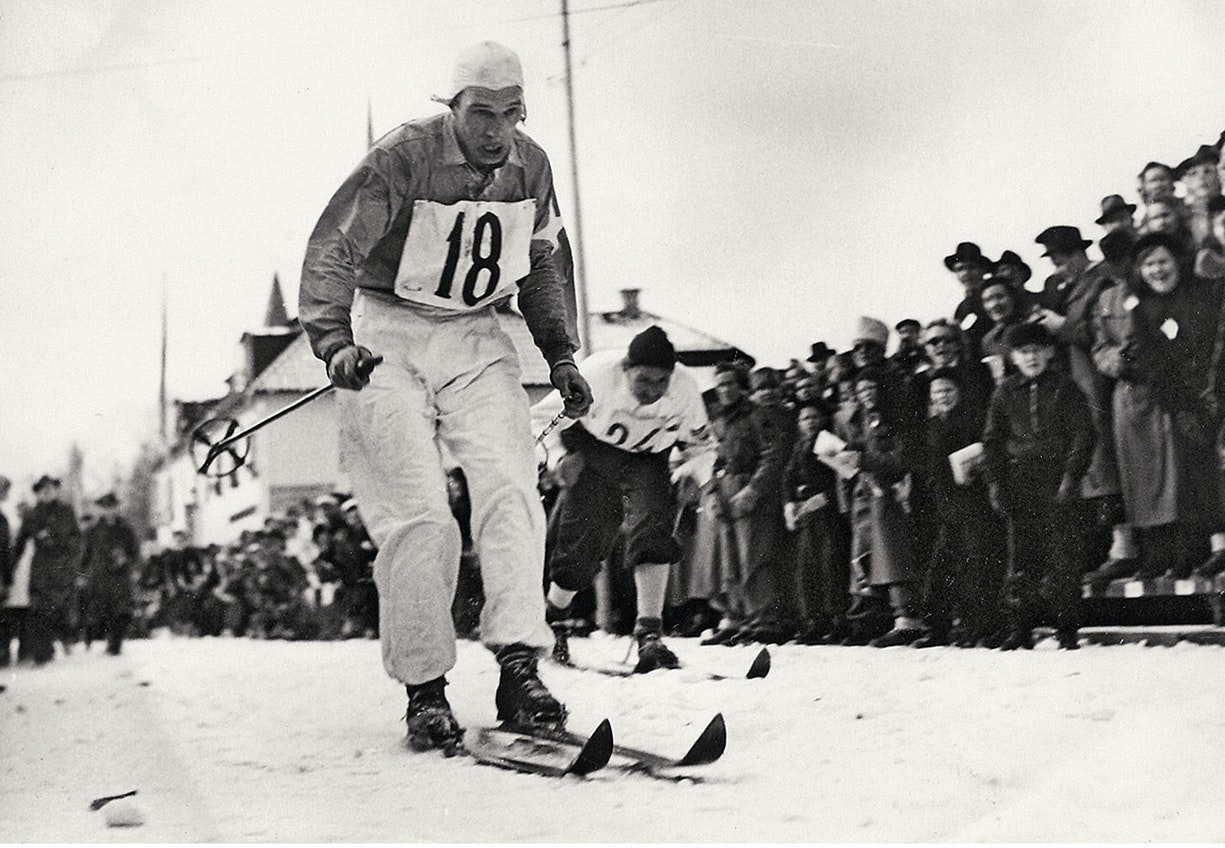
Gösta Andersson cross-country skiing.

Gösta Andersson (18 January 1918 in Umeå, Sweden – 24 November 1979 in Holmsund, Sweden) was a Swedish cross-country skier who won the Vasaloppet ski race in 1944 with a margin of one second before Nils Karlsson (Mora-Nisse).
