= Henrik Eriksson (cross-country skier) =

Swedish cross-country skier

Personal information
- Nationality: Sweden
- Born: February 4, 1974 (age 52)

Sport
- Sport: Skiing
- Club: IFK Mora SK

World Cup career
- Seasons: 5 – (1996, 1998–1999, 2001, 2006)
- Indiv. starts: 5
- Indiv. podiums: 0
- Team starts: 2
- Team podiums: 0
- Overall titles: 0 – (143rd in 2006)
- Discipline titles: 0
Medal record
Men's cross-country skiing
Representing Sweden
Junior World Championships
Bronze medal – third place	1994 Breitenwang	4 × 10 km relay

Henrik Eriksson (born 4 February 1974) is a Swedish former cross-country skier. When it came to club competitions, he competed for IFK Mora SK. Competing at elite level between 1994 and 2006, he participated at Vasaloppet several times, winning the event in 2001. In Vasaloppet 2002, he ended up ninth and Vasaloppet in 2004 he ended up tenth.

== Cross-country skiing results ==
All results are sourced from the International Ski Federation (FIS).

=== World Cup ===
==== Season standings ====
Season	Age				
Season	Age	Overall	Distance	Long Distance	Sprint
1996	22	NC	—N/a	—N/a	—N/a
1998	24	NC	—N/a	NC	—
1999	25	NC	—N/a	NC	—
2001	27	NC	—N/a	—N/a	—
2006	32	143	104	—N/a	—
