= Hans Persson =

Swedish cross-country skier

Personal information
- Born: 18 January 1959

Sport
- Sport: Skiing
- Club: Åsarna IK

Hans Persson, born 18 January 1959, is a Swedish former cross-country skier, specialized at long-distance races. In 1984, he won Vasaloppet. Representing at Åsarna IK, he won the Swedish national relay championship with that club in 1980-1983 and again in 1988.
