= Susanne Nyström =

Swedish cross-country skier

Personal information
- Full name: Susanne Elinor Nyström
- Nationality: Sweden
- Born: December 29, 1982 (age 43) Laisvall, Sweden

Sport
- Sport: Skiing

World Cup career
- Seasons: 6 – (2003–2008)
- Indiv. starts: 13
- Indiv. podiums: 0
- Team starts: 2
- Team podiums: 0
- Overall titles: 0 – (90th in 2006)
- Discipline titles: 0

Susanne Nyström, born 29 December 1982 in Laisvall, Sweden is a Swedish female cross-country skier and nurse.

She competed for Laisvalls SK, having competed for clubs like IFK Mora SK, Arvidsjaur Ski Team] Luleå Gjutarens IF and Piteå Elit.

She won Tjejvasan in 2007, 2008, 2009, 2010, 2012 and 2013. and ended up second ad Tjejvasan 2011. In 2010, she won the women's Vasaloppet main competition, making her the first to win Tjejvasan and the Vasaloppet main competition the same year.

She has also won several Swedish national championship gold medals.

== Cross-country skiing results ==
All results are sourced from the International Ski Federation (FIS).

=== World Cup ===
==== Season standings ====
Season	Age	Discipline standings			Ski Tour standings	
Season	Age	Overall	Distance	Sprint	Tour de Ski	World Cup Final
2003	21	NC	—N/a	—	—N/a	—N/a
2004	22	NC	—	NC	—N/a	—N/a
2005	23	NC	NC	NC	—N/a	—N/a
2006	24	90	79	67	—N/a	—N/a
2007	25	98	NC	68	—	—N/a
2008	26	NC	—	NC	—	—
