= Ernst Alm =

Swedish cross-country skier

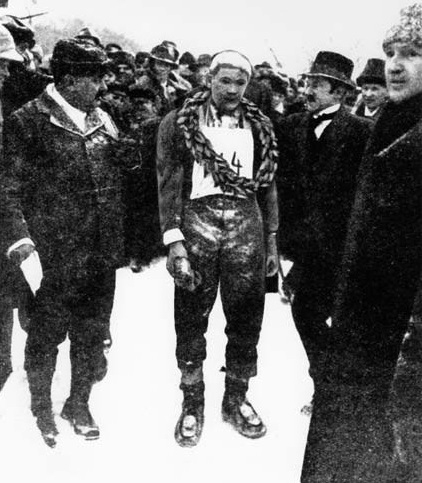
- Ernst Alm, first winner of Vasaloppet, 1922

Personal information
- Nationality: Sweden
- Born: 1 March 1900 Hemmingen, Sweden
- Died: 7 October 1980 (aged 80) Skelleftehamn, Sweden

Sport
- Sport: Skiing
- Club: IFK Norsjö, Skellefteå IF

Ernst Alm (March 1, 1900, in Norsjö – October 7, 1980) was a Swedish cross-country skier who competed in the 1924 Winter Olympics. He finished sixth in the 50 km event. Alm also won the first Vasaloppet in 1922

== Cross-country skiing results ==
=== Olympic Games ===
Year	Age	18 km	50 km
1924	23	—	6
