= Oxberg =

Coordinates: 61.1169°N 14.1742°E

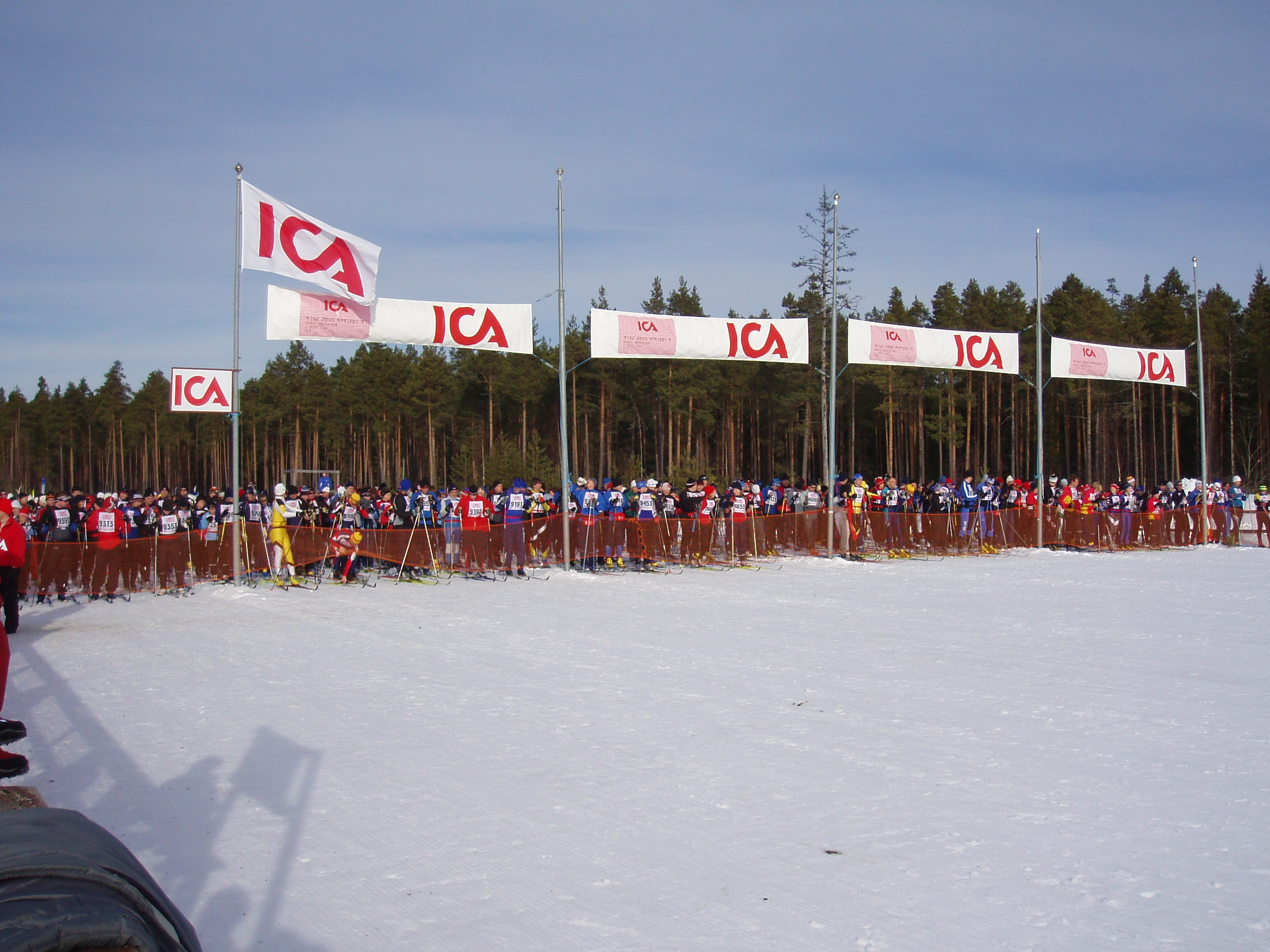
- Kortvasan starting in Oxberg. February 2006.

- Location within Dalarna Location within Sweden
- Country: Sweden
- Province: Dalarna
- County: Dalarna
- Municipality: Mora

Population (31 December 2010)
  - Total: 97
  - Density: 1.44/km^{2} (3.7/sq mi)
- Time zone: UTC+1 (CET)
  - Summer (DST): UTC+2 (CEST)

Oxberg is a minor locality in Mora Municipality, Sweden. It had 97 inhabitants in 2010. Vasaloppet goes through Oxberg. It is also the start site for Tjejvasan, Kortvasan and Halvvasan. The Oxberg Bridge is also located here.
