= Nils Karlsson =

Swedish cross-country skier (1917–2012)

Nils "Mora-Nisse" Karlsson
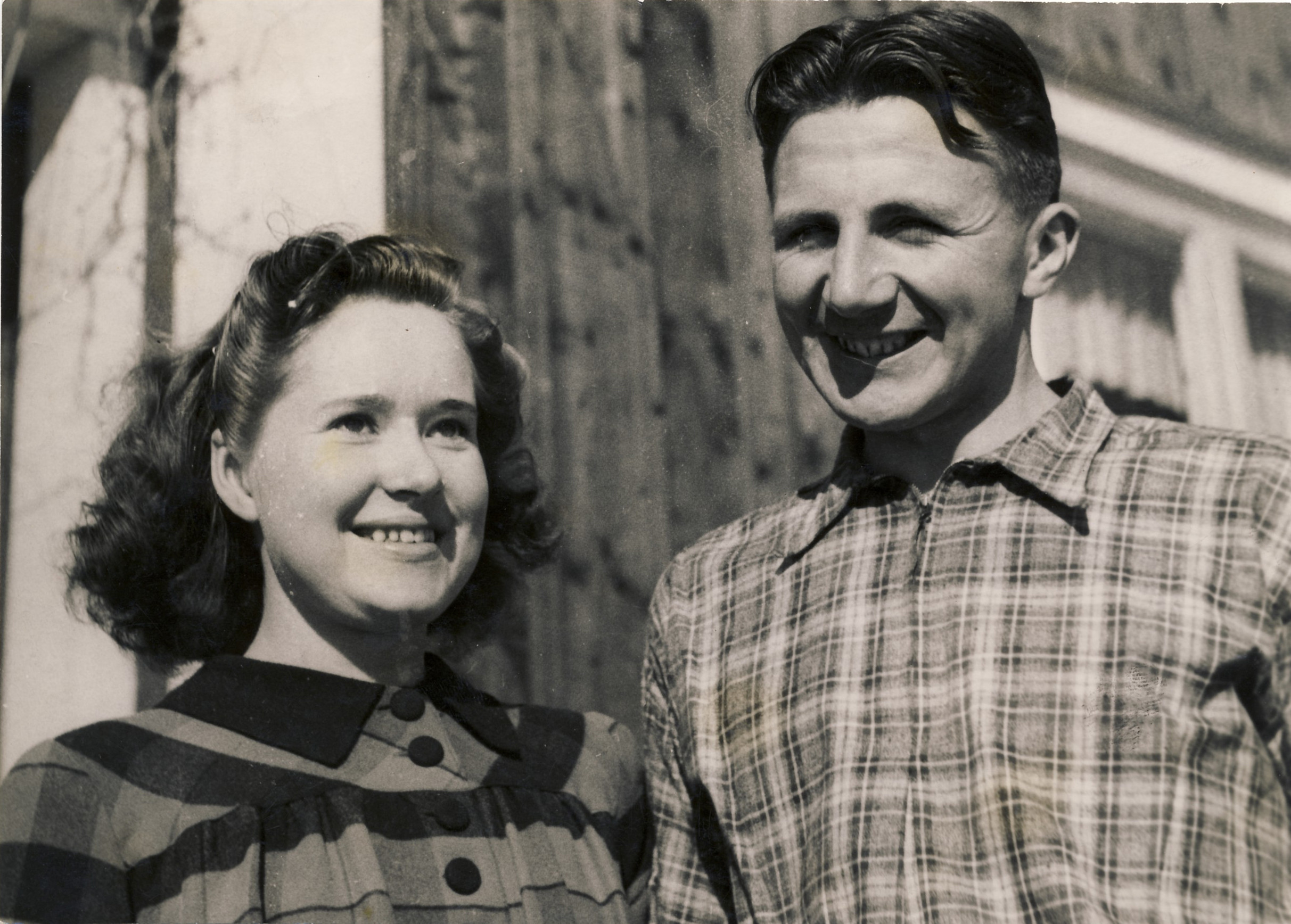
- Nils Karlsson with his wife Ulla-Britt

Personal information
- Full name: Nils Emanuel Karlsson
- Born: 25 June 1917 Östnor, Sweden
- Died: 16 June 2012 (aged 94) Mora, Sweden

Sport
- Sport: Skiing
- Club: IFK Mora SK
Medal record
Men's cross-country skiing
Representing Sweden
Olympic Games
| Gold medal – first place | 1948 St. Moritz | 50 km |
World Championships
| Bronze medal – third place | 1950 Lake Placid | 50 km |

Nils Emanuel Karlsson (25 June 1917 – 16 June 2012), better known as Mora-Nisse, was a Swedish cross-country skier. Karlsson won gold in the 50 km event at the 1948 Winter Olympics and nine Vasaloppet victories.

== Biography ==
He was born near Mora.

He won the Olympic gold medal in the 50 km at the 1948 Winter Olympics, a bronze medal in 50 km at the 1950 FIS Nordic World Ski Championships, and a total of 37 gold medals in Swedish national championships, 17 in individual competition. He also won Vasaloppet nine times (in 1943, 1945, 1946, 1947, 1948, 1949, 1950, 1951 and 1953). Karlsson won the Holmenkollen ski festival 50 km event twice (1947 and 1951) as well. For his success in cross-country skiing, Karlsson was awarded the Holmenkollen medal in 1952 (shared with Stein Eriksen, Torbjørn Falkanger and Heikki Hasu). Eight years earlier, Karlsson was awarded the Svenska Dagbladet Gold Medal.

Karlsson has meant a lot to Vasaloppet, initially through his many victories. With the aid of Sven Jerring's radio sports commentary, he made Vasaloppet known throughout the country. After his active career, he participated in the administration of Vasaloppet, both as a leader and as chief of the course. Two of his grandchildren have been successful in the Vasaloppet - Erik Eriksson has repeatedly finished within the top ten, once ending up in a fourth place; meanwhile Anders Eriksson was once 38th.

Between 1954 and 1966 Karlsson trained the national cross-country skiing team, yet he lived all his life in his native village Östnor near Mora, where a road was named after him during his lifetime, and where he ran the sport equipment store "Mora-Nisse Sports". The Mora-Nisse's Jubilee Fund was established on his 65th birthday, which supports young Swedish skiers.

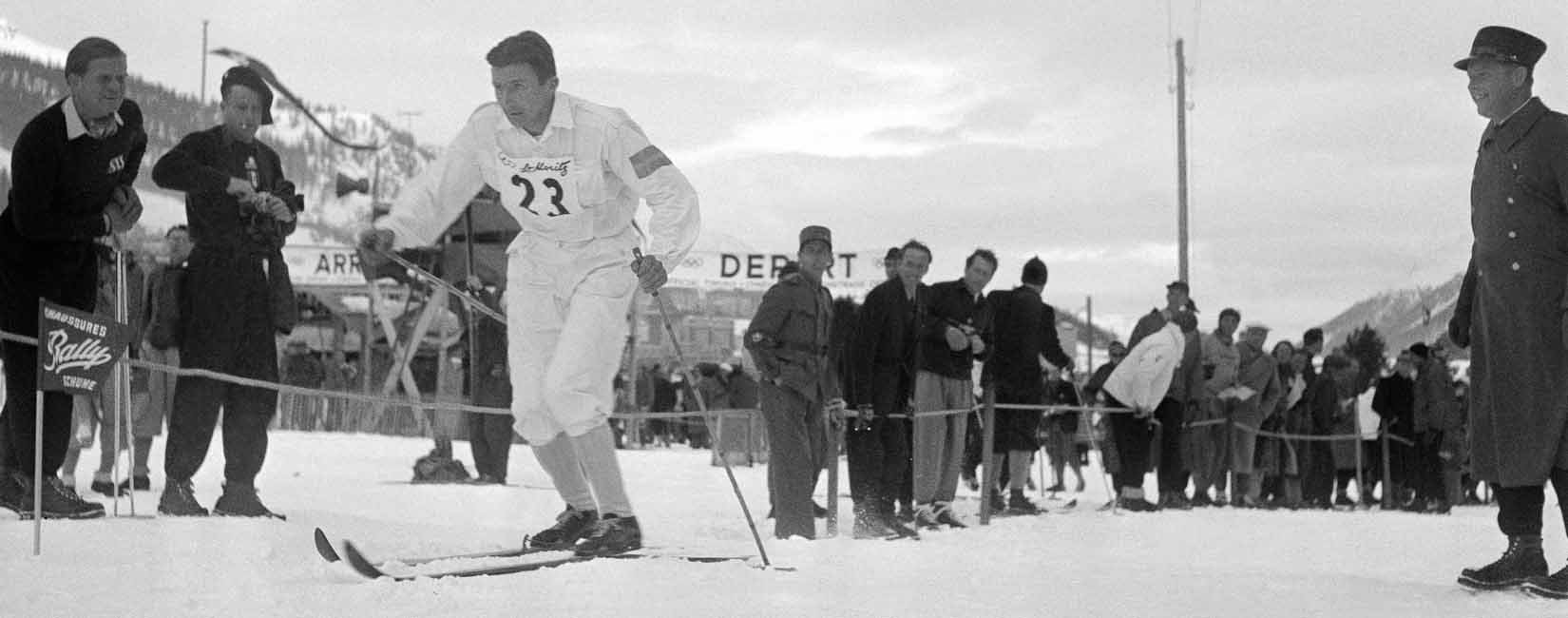
Karlsson at the 1948 Olympics

== Cross-country skiing results ==
All results are sourced from the International Ski Federation (FIS).

=== Olympic Games ===
- 1 medal – (1 gold)

| Year | Age | 18 km | 50 km | 4 × 10 km relay |
|---|---|---|---|---|
| 1948 | 30 | 5 | Gold | — |
| 1952 | 34 | 5 | 6 | — |

=== World Championships ===
- 1 medal – (1 bronze)

| Year | Age | 18 km | 50 km | 4 × 10 km relay |
|---|---|---|---|---|
| 1950 | 32 | 13 | Bronze | — |

| Preceded by Arne Andersson | Svenska Dagbladet Gold Medal; 1944 | Succeeded by Claes Egnell |
