= Pauli Siitonen =

Finnish cross-country skier (1938–2024)

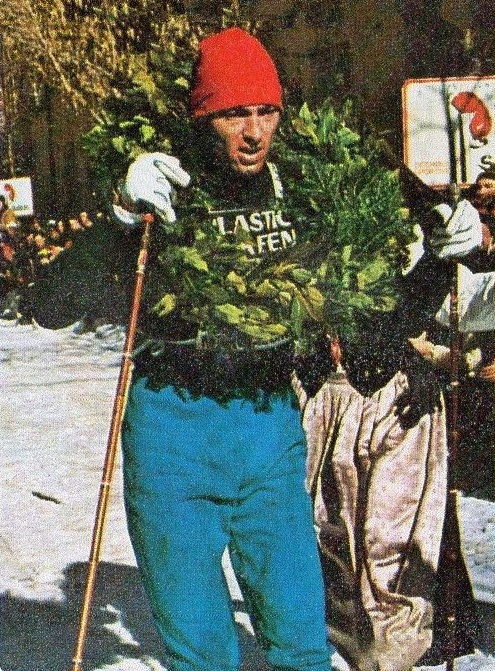
- Siitonen c. 1972

Personal information
- Born: 3 February 1938 Simpele, Finland
- Died: 20 April 2024 (aged 86) Espoo, Finland
- Height: 1.75 m (5 ft 9 in)
- Weight: 70 kg (150 lb)

Sport
- Sport: Skiing

Pauli Ensio Siitonen (3 February 1938 – 20 April 2024) was a Finnish cross-country skier. He was one of the most successful long-distance cross-country skiers of the 1970s, and in 1973 became the second Finnish skier to win Vasaloppet. Siitonen competed at the 1968 Olympics, and won the Finlandia-hiihto in Finland and König-Ludwig-Lauf in West Germany.

Siitonen is credited with popularizing the so-called Siitonen-step (or "marathon skate"), the precursor to modern skating technique in cross-country skiing.

Siitonen died on 20 April 2024, at the age of 86.

== Cross-country skiing results ==
=== Olympic Games ===
Year	Age	15 km	30 km	50 km	4 × 10 km relay
1968	30	—	—	19	—
