= Johan Abram Persson =

Swedish cross-country skier (1898–1971)

Personal information
- Born: 13 July 1898 Luokta Sami Village, Sweden
- Died: 24 February 1971 (aged 72) Skerfa, Sweden

Sport
- Sport: Skiing
- Club: Arjeplogs SK

Johan Abram Persson (13 July 1898 – 24 February 1971) was a Swedish cross-country skier, fisherman, craftsman and wolfhunter. He was the son of Per Larsson and Anna Stina Bassem from Luokta lappby, and lived in Skierfa near the Pite River throughout his entire life.

Competing for Arjeplogs SK in club competitions and for Sweden in international events, he won Vasaloppet in 1929.

== Cross-country skiing results ==
=== World Championships ===
Year	Age	17 km	18 km	50 km	4 × 10 km relay
1930	31	—	—N/a	17	—N/a
1933	34	—N/a	—	5	—
