= Laila Kveli =

Norwegian cross-country skier

Personal information
- Born: 22 October 1987

Sport
- Sport: Skiing
- Club: Lierne IL

Laila Kveli (born 22 October 1987, in Trondheim, Norway) is a Norwegian cross-country skier. She finished second in the women's main competition of Vasaloppet in 2012, and won the same competition in 2013 and 2014.

== Merits ==
=== 2012 ===
2nd place, Vasaloppet

=== 2013 ===
1st place, Vasaloppet

2nd place, Marcialonga

3rd place, König-Ludwig-Lauf

=== 2014 ===
1st place, Vasaloppet

=== 2015 ===
1st place, Tjejvasan
