= Glommersträsk =

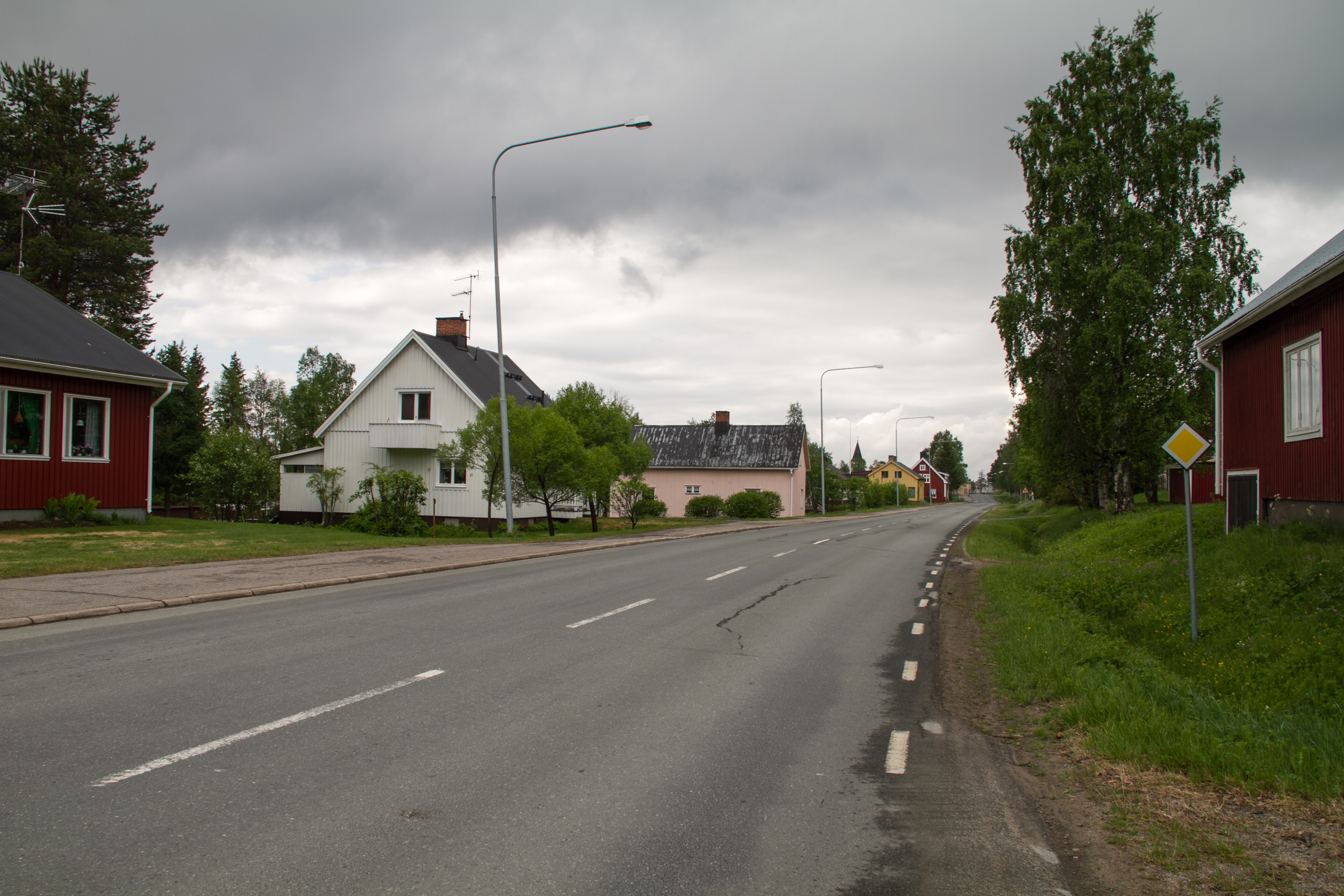

- Location within Norrbotten Location within Sweden
- Coordinates: 65°16′N 19°38′E
- Country: Sweden
- Province: Lapland
- County: Norrbotten County
- Municipality: Arvidsjaur Municipality

Area
  - Total: 1.52 km^{2} (0.59 sq mi)

Population (2017)
  - Total: 231
  - Density: 179/km^{2} (460/sq mi)
- Time zone: UTC+1 (CET)
  - Summer (DST): UTC+2 (CEST)

Glommersträsk (Swedish pronunciation: [ˈɡlʊ̂mːɛʂˌtrɛsk]) is a locality situated in Arvidsjaur Municipality, Norrbotten County, Sweden, with 272 inhabitants in 2010.
