= Uddevalla IS =

Swedish football club

- Full name: Uddevalla IS
- Nickname: UIS
- Founded: 1907
- Ground: Rimnersvallen, Uddevalla
Home colours

Uddevalla IS is a Swedish sports club located in Uddevalla.

Historically, the club has also competed in athletics, bandy, cycling, gymnastics, orienteering, skating, skiing, and wrestling. The wrestler Sanfrid Söderqvist became European champion in 1929.

The original club colours were black and green striped shirts and blue shorts.

The football team played in Västsvenska serien, a second-tier league during three season in the 1920s, in 1925–26, 1926–27, and 1927–28. The club dropped their football team in 2013 after 100 years of league play.
