= Peter Göransson =

Personal information
- Full name: Lars Peter Göransson
- Nationality: Sweden
- Born: May 20, 1969 (age 57)

Sport
- Sport: Skiing
- Club: Åsarna IK

World Cup career
- Seasons: 7 – (1994–1998, 2000–2001)
- Indiv. starts: 14
- Indiv. podiums: 0
- Team starts: 5
- Team podiums: 0
- Overall titles: 0 – (60th in 1995)
- Discipline titles: 0
- Updated on 3 April 2019

Peter Göransson (born 20 May 1969) is a former Swedish cross-country skier who competed from 1993 to 2003. His best World Cup finish was 12th in a sprint event in Sweden in 1997. He won Vasaloppet in 1998 with a time of 3 hours, 38 minutes and 57 seconds, beating the old Vasaloppet record by ten minutes. This record lasted for 14 years until Jörgen Brink in 2012 finished Vasaloppet 16 seconds faster (3 hours, 38 minutes and 41 seconds).

== Cross-country skiing results ==
All results are sourced from the International Ski Federation (FIS).

=== World Cup ===
==== Season standings ====
Season	Age				
Season	Age	Overall	Long Distance	Middle Distance	Sprint
1994	24	NC	—N/a	—N/a	—N/a
1995	25	60	—N/a	—N/a	—N/a
1996	26	NC	—N/a	—N/a	—N/a
1997	27	75	NC	—N/a	55
1998	28	NC	NC	—N/a	—
2000	30	114	—	69	—
2001	31	NC	—N/a	—N/a	—
