= Åsarna IK =

Sports club in Åsarna, Sweden

- Short name: ÅIK
- Sport: cross-country skiing
- Founded: 1 May 1924
- Based in: Åsarna, Sweden
- Website: www.guldbyn.nu

Åsarna IK, founded in 1924, is a Swedish sports club in Åsarna, Jämtland. The club has had many prominent competitors in cross-country skiing, which is evident in the nickname of the village Åsarna, Guldbyn (Gold Village), which was coined after the 1988 Winter Olympics when three out of the four competitors in the men's relay competition came from the club. Åsarna IK has also spawned prominent track and field athletes.

== History ==
The club was founded on 1 May 1924 as Åsarna IK, before changing name on 1 February 1942, following a merger with Åsarna BK. Anton Bolinder (born 1915), who started jumping in a gravel pit in Åsarna, became the European champion in high jump in 1946 (jumping 1,99 m), and runner John Isberg broke the junior world record for 1500 m five times in the 1940s. By the time of their international breakthroughs, both Bolinder and Isberg had changed clubs to IFK Östersund. Bolinder became Swedish champion twice in high jump. In mid 2015 a book about Åsarna IK appeared. The club's chairperson since 2014, Ingvar Borg (1954–2017), died in a snow scooter accident in December 2017.

== Notable skiers from Åsarna IK ==
- Jens Burman
- Hanna Erikson
- Ida Ingemarsdotter
- Mats Larsson
- Moa Lundgren
- Torgny Mogren
- Lars Nelson
- Anna Olsson
- Johan Olsson
- Jan Ottosson
- Thomas Wassberg
- Emma Wikén
- Lars-Göran Åslund
- Edvin Anger

== Winners of Vasaloppet ==
- Sofia Lind – 1996, 1997, 1999, 2004 and 2005
- Hans Persson – 1984
- Peter Göransson – 1998
- Jan Ottosson – 1989, 1991, 1992, 1994
