= IFK Mora =

Sports club in Mora, Sweden

- Full name: Idrottsföreningen Mora
- Nicknames: Morakamraterna
- Sport: orienteering, cross-country skiing, orienteering, athletics, gymnastics, football
- Founded: 22 August 1909
- Based in: Mora, Sweden

IFK Mora is a sports club in Mora, Sweden. The club was founded on 22 August 1909, and became an alliance club on 1 January 1992, following a 1991 decision. IFK Mora is known for its successes in orienteering and cross-country skiing but is also active in athletics, gymnastics, and football. IFK Mora and Sälens IF own and arrange Vasaloppet together every year.

The best known profile in the club is Nils "Mora-Nisse" Karlsson, Olympic gold winner in cross-country skiing in 1948 and won Vasaloppet nine times.

== Association football ==
The men's football team has been playing two seasons in the second highest division.

== Orienteering ==
The club's team came second in Tiomila in 1965 with Karl-Åke Asph, Åke Stenkvist in the first two legs and Anders Romson in the last one.
