= Imperial, royal and noble ranks =

Legal privilege given to some members in monarchical and princely societies

Traditional rank amongst European imperiality, royalty, peers, and nobility is rooted in Late Antiquity and the Middle Ages. Although they vary over time and among geographic regions (for example, one region's prince might be equal to another's grand duke), the following is a reasonably comprehensive list that provides information on both general ranks and specific differences. Distinction should be made between reigning (or formerly reigning) families and the nobility – the latter being a social class subject to and created by the former.

== Sovereign ==
- The word monarch is derived from the Greek μονάρχης, monárkhēs, "sole ruler" (from μόνος, mónos, "single" or "sole", and ἄρχων, árkhōn, "archon", "leader", "ruler", "chief", the word being the present participle of the verb ἄρχειν, árkhein, "to rule", "to lead", this from the noun ὰρχή, arkhē, "beginning", "authority", "principle") through the Latinized form monarcha.
- The word sovereign is derived from the Latin super ("above").
- Autocrat is derived from the Greek αὐτοκράτωρ: αὐτός ("self") and κρατείν ("to hold power"), and may be translated as "one who rules by himself."

Many titles listed may also be used by lesser nobles – non-sovereigns – depending on the historical period and state. The sovereign titles listed below are grouped together into categories roughly according to their degree of dignity; these being: imperial (Emperor/Empress, etc.), royal (King/Queen, Grand Duke, etc.), others (sovereign Prince, sovereign Duke, etc.), and religious.

=== Imperial titles ===
- Emperor (in English), Imperador (in Portuguese), Emperador (in Spanish), Imperatore (in Italian), Împărat (in Romanian), and Empereur (in French), from the Latin Imperator, was originally a military title. Soldiers would salute the leader of a victorious army as 'imperator'. In English, the feminine form is Empress (the Latin is imperatrix). The realm of an emperor or empress is termed an Empire. Other words meaning Emperor include:
  - Augustus, a Roman honorific title which means "venerable" or "majestic", used by Roman Emperors from the beginning of the Empire onwards. The feminine form is Augusta.
  - Caesar, the appellation of Roman emperors derived from the Roman dictator Julius Caesar, whose great-nephew and adopted son Gaius Julius Caesar Augustus became the first emperor of Rome. Augustus' four successors were each made the adoptive son of his predecessor, and were therefore legally entitled to use "Caesar" as a constituent of their names; after Nero, however, the familial link of the Julio-Claudian dynasty was disrupted and use of the word Caesar continued as a title only.
    - Kaiser, derived from Caesar, primarily used in Germanic countries. The feminine form in German is Kaiserin.
    - Tsar / Tzar / Csar / Czar, derived as shortened variant of the Slavic pronunciation of Caesar (tsyasar), the feminine form is Tsaritsa, primarily used in Bulgaria, and after that in Russia and other Slavic countries, although in English Tsarina was also sometimes used.
    - Keizer, the Dutch word for Caesar. The Dutch and Portuguese gave the rulers of Sonbai the title of "emperor" (keizer, imperador).
    - Kaysar-i Rûm, claimed by the Ottoman monarchs
  - Basileus kai Autokrator, Medieval Greek title meaning "sovereign and autocrat", used by the Greek Byzantine Emperors from the 9th century onwards.
  - Huēyi Tlahtloāni, the Classical Nahuatl term for the ruler of multiple āltepētl, a pre-Hispanic city-state in Mesoamerica, commonly referring to the head of the Aztec Triple Alliance, or Aztec Empire. It is variously translated in English as "Great Speaker" or the equivalent to the European "great king" or "high king", though more usually as "emperor".
  - Sapa Inca, The Sapa Inca (Hispanicized spelling) or Sapa Inka (Quechua for "the only Inca"), also known as Apu ("divinity"), Inka Qhapaq ("mighty Inca"), or simply Sapa ("the only one"), was the ruler of the Kingdom of Cusco and, later, the monarch of the Tawantinsuyu (called Inca Empire by historians) and the Neo-Inca State.
  - Samrat, (Sanskrit: samrāt or सम्राट) is an ancient Indian title meaning "king of all lands". The feminine form is Samrājñī ("queen of all lands").
  - Chakravarti, the universal monarch in the Indian cultural sphere. The feminine form is Chakravartini.
    - Chakravartigal, the equivalent of the northern Chakravartin. Used by the emperors of the Chola Empire.
    - Tribhuvana-Chakravartin, literally "emperor of the three worlds", used by the Cholas
    - Cakkavattin, Pali for Chakravartin. Claimed by the Siamese, Khmer, Lao, and Burmese monarchs.
      - Chakkaphat, the Thai/Lao version of Cakkavattin
    - 轉輪王 ("wheel-turning king") or 轉輪聖王 ("wheel-turning sacred king"), the Chinese characters for Chakravarti, used in East Asia
      - 金輪王 or 金輪聖王, meaning "cakravartin of the golden wheel", used by the Chinese empress Wu Zetian, the Japanese emperor Go-Daigo, the Goryeo monarchs of Korea, etc.
      - Emperor Manjushri, one of the titles for the Qing emperors. Related to the wheel-turning king (Chakravarti).
  - Padishah, Persian pād "master" and shāh "king". Used in the Ottoman Empire and the Mughal Empire.
  - 皇帝 is the title of emperors in East Asia. An emperor is called Huángdì in Chinese, Hwangje in Korean, Hoàng đế in Vietnamese, and Kōtei in Japanese, but these are all just their respective pronunciations of the Chinese characters 皇帝.
    - Huangdi (皇帝), the Imperial monarch during Imperial China.
      - Da Huangdi (大皇帝), literally "great emperor", one of the titles for the Qing emperors
    - Hwangje (황제; 皇帝), title used for emperors of the Korean Empire
      - Seonghwang (성황; 聖皇), literally "holy emperor", one of the titles for the rulers of the Goryeo. It is a combination of 聖 (seong), meaning "holy", and 皇, an abbreviation of 皇帝 (hwangje).
    - Hoàng đế (皇帝), Vietnamese, meaning "emperor"
    - Kōtei (皇帝), Japanese title primarily used for emperors of other nations (e.g. Rome, Russia, China, Germany). Tennō refers only to an emperor of Japan, whereas kōtei refers to an emperor of any country.
      - Tennō (天皇), meaning "heavenly emperor", title used for emperors of Japan. It is a combination of 天 (ten), meaning "heavenly", and 皇, an abbreviation of 皇帝 (kōtei).
      - Mikado (帝), the traditional title for Tennō. 帝 (mikado) is an abbreviation of 皇帝 (kōtei).
  - King of Kings, the style of monarchic title used in a number of empires
    - Khagan, derived from "khan of khans", used by the Central Asian nomads. The feminine form is Khatun.
      - Tian Kehan (天可汗), meaning "heavenly khagan", given to Tang Taizong and Tang Gaozong by Turkic nomads
    - Šar Šarrāni, Akkadian for "king of kings"
    - Shahanshah, Persian title equivalent of the style King of Kings, meaning "shah of shahs". Used by Persian/Iranian monarchs.
    - Sulṭānü's-Selāṭīn, the sultanic equivalent of the style King of Kings, meaning "Sultan of Sultans".
    - Basileus Basileōn, Ancient Greek title meaning "king of kings", used by Alexander the Great after the similar title of the Achaemenid dynasty of Persia. A translation from Ancient Persian Shahanshah.
    - Nəgusä Nägäst, title of the rulers of Ethiopia, meaning "king of kings".
    - Ark'ayits Ark'a, Արքայից Արքայ, Armenian for "king of kings"
    - Mepe-Mepeta, მეფეთა მეფე, Georgian for "king of kings"
    - Rajadhiraja, Sanskrit for "king of kings"
      - Maharajadhiraja, meaning "great king of kings", used by the emperors of the Gupta Empire. In ancient India it was an imperial title, but it later became a royal title.
        - Paramabhattaraka-Maharajadhiraja-Paramesvara, a standard formula of imperial dignity in India. The feminine form is Paramabhattarika-Maharajadhiraja-Paramesvari.
    - Malik al-Muluk, Arabic title meaning "king of kings"

=== Royal titles ===
- King, from the Germanic *kuningaz, roughly meaning "son of the people." (See: Germanic kingship) (Note: Loss of sovereignty or fief does not necessarily lead to loss of title. The position in the ranking table is however accordingly adjusted. The occurrence of fiefs has changed from time to time, and from country to country. For instance, dukes in England rarely had a duchy to rule.) The realm of a king is termed a kingdom (sovereign kings are ranked above vassal kings). The female equivalent is queen, with a distinction between queen regnant and queen consort, from the Germanic *kwoeniz, or *kwenon, "wife"; cognate of Greek γυνή, gynē, "woman"; from PIE *gʷḗn, "woman". Regardless of a ruler's sex, their realm is known as a kingdom.
  - Great King, a royal title suggesting an elevated status among the host of kings.
  - High King, a king who holds a position of seniority over a group of other kings, without the title of emperor.
  - Rex, Latin for king, the feminine form is Regina.
  - Rei (in Portuguese and Catalan), Rey (in Spanish), Re (in Italian), Roi (in French), Rege (in Romanian) – Derived from Latin Rex, meaning "ruler". Rex is cognate with Raja, Rí, Reign, Regina, Arqa (Armenian Արքա), etc.
  - Basileus, from Mycenaean Greek meaning "chieftain", used by various Ancient Greek rulers.
  - Bretwalda, title given to some of the rulers of Anglo-Saxon kingdoms from the 5th century onwards who had achieved overlordship of some or all of the other Anglo-Saxon kingdoms.
  - Król (in Polish) Král (in Czech), Király (in Hungarian), Король (in Russian and Ukrainian), Кароль (in Belarusian), Краљ / Kralj (in Croatian and Serbian), Крал (in Bulgarian), Crai (in Romanian), Korol – Derived from Old East Slavic Король king, used in Kazakh, Tatar, and Kyrgyz languages. The korol, krol, kral, крал and kiraly versions used in Central Europe and Eastern Europe derive from the name of Charlemagne.
  - Rí, Gaelic title meaning king, of which there were several grades, the highest being Ard Rí (high king). Cognate with Indian Raja, Latin Rex, and ancient Gaulish Rix.
  - Shah, Persian word for king, from Indo-European for "he who rules". Used in Persia, alongside Shahanshah. The feminine form is Shahbanu.
    - Pivot of the Universe, Persian title exculsively used by Shahs.
  - Sultan, from Arabic and originally referring to one who had "power", more recently used as synonym for a king. The feminine equivalent is a Sultana.
    - Suratrana, Sanskrit for Sultan
  - Mepe, მეფე, Georgian word for king and queen regnant.
  - Arka or Arqa (Արքա) is a royal title (king) in Great Armenia and various Kingdoms of Armenia. Another used name was Tagavor or Thagawor, which also appeared later in Cilician Armenia.
  - Melech, Hebrew word for king. The word for queen is Malka.
  - Malik, Arabic for "king". The feminine equivalent is a Malika.
  - Lugal, is the Sumerian term for "king, ruler". Literally, the term means "big man."
  - Anax, from Mycenaean wanax for "high king". Outranked Basileus in Mycenaean usage.
  - Pharaoh, "Man of the Great House (Palace)" used in Ancient Egypt to denote the kings of Upper Egypt and Lower Egypt in the Nile river valley.
  - 王 is the title of kings in East Asia. A king is called Wáng in Chinese, Wang in Korean, Vương in Vietnamese, and Ō in Japanese, but these are all just their respective pronunciations of the Chinese character 王.
    - Wáng (王), the head of state of Ancient China. In ancient China it was a royal title, but later became a princely title.
      - Bà Wáng (霸王), meaning "Hegemon-King"
      - Tian Wang (天王), meaning "heavenly king"
      - Yìxìng Wáng (異姓王), meaning "different surnamed king/prince". This title was granted to subjects as a peerage.
    - Wang (왕; 王), Korean, meaning "king"
      - Daewang (대왕; 大王), Korean title meaning "great king"
      - Taewang (태왕; 太王), literally "greatest king", a Korean title for the rulers of the Goguryeo
      - Seongwang (성왕; 聖王), meaning "holy king", used by the Balhae monarchs
      - Sinseongjewang (신성제왕; 神聖帝王), literally "holy emperor-king", one of the titles for the rulers of the Goryeo
    - Vương (王), Vietnamese, meaning "king". In ancient Vietnam it was a royal title, but later became a princely title.
      - Đại vương (大王), Vietnamese, meaning "great king/prince"
    - Ō (王), Japanese, meaning "king", or "sovereign". Also the title for the rulers of the Wakoku. In ancient Japan it was a royal title, but later became a princely title. The female title is Joō (女王).
      - Okimi (大王), Japanese title meaning "great king"
  - Khan, from the Turco-Mongol word for "ruler" or "king". The feminine equivalent is a Khanum. A Khan's realm is called a Khanate.
    - Maripgan (마립간; 麻立干), literally "highest khan", a Korean title for the rulers of early Silla
    - Bogda Khan, one of the titles for the Qing emperors
  - Tsenpo, also known as Ihase or "Divine Son", was the title of the monarchs of Tibet.
  - Chanyu, short for Chengli Gutu Chanyu (撐犁孤塗單于) was a title used by supreme nomadic rulers of Inner Asia. Meaning "Son of Heaven, Ruler of the North", it was later superseded by the title Khagan.
  - Arasan (அரசன்), Vēndhar (வேந்தர்), Kō (கோ) are the various titles referring to the King in Tamil.
  - Raja, Sanskrit, later Hindustani, for "king". Cognate with Latin Rex, Irish Rí, Armenian Arqa, etc. The female equivalent is Rani. The Filipino feminine equivalent is Hara.
    - Devaraja, literally "god king". A title in the Khmer Empire and throughout Java
    - Raya, a regional variation of Raja.
    - Devaraya, literally "god king", used by the Vijayanagara monarchs
    - Rai, a regional variation of Raja.
    - Rao, a regional variation of Raja.
    - Rana, a regional variation of Raja.
    - Rawal, a regional variation of Raja.
    - Racha / Rachini written in Thai as ราชา or ราชินี. deriving from the Sanskrit राज (rāja, "king"). King is ราชา (Racha), Queen is ราชินี (Rachini). Typically refer to the person, not necessary a title.
  - Maharaja, Sanskrit, later Hindustani, for "Great King". It is the title of high kings in the Indian subcontinent. The feminine equivalent is Maharani.
    - Maharao, a regional variation of Maharaja.
    - Maharawal, a regional variation of Maharaja.
    - Maharana, a regional variation of Maharaja.
  - Kamonteng Ansi (กมรเตงอัญศรี) deriving from Old Khmer, used for Sukhothai kings. Meaning: "Lord of Our Lives." Used for king Kamonteng Ansi Inthrabodinthrathit, and Phrabat Kamonteng Ansi Rammarat. In which, following the latter's reign, the title became defunct
  - Khun (ขุน) an archaic Thai term referring to a leader.
    - Pho Khun (พ่อขุน) derivation of Khun. Used during the Sukhothai kingdom era. An example is Pho Khun Ban Mueang
    - Khun Luang (ขุนหลวง) derivation of Khun. Used during the Ayutthaya kingdom era. This title is not used with names, only to refer to the person only. For example, to refer to the King. One says Khun Luang, never Khun Luang Ekkathat. If one wishes to refer to a king, one must either say the regnant name: Somdet Phra Borommaracha III or a personal (formal) name: Somdet Phra Chao Ekkathat.
  - Chao (เจ้า) in Thai means Lord or Master.
    - Phra Chao (พระเจ้า) informal version of Somdet Phra Chao. A derivation of Chao.
    - Somdet Phra Chao (สมเด็จพระเจ้า) a derivation of Chao.
    - Chao Fa (เจ้าฟ้า) a generally use title for chieftain, lord, and kings among the Tai people. This is also used for personal names of Thai Kings. A derivation of Chao. Though in modern Thailand, this might be refer to a prince or princess.
    - Sao Möm, a derivation of Chao used among Tai peoples in the Shan State.
    - Sao, a derivation of Chao used among Tai peoples in the Shan State.
  - Nai Luang (ในหลวง) informally referring to a king, the King of Thailand.
  - Phraya (พระยา) an archaic title referring to a Thai King. This was used during the Sukhothai era. Later on during the Ayutthaya, Rattanakosin/Siam, and Thailand era, this was used to refer to a duke instead of a king.
  - Susuhunan, "he to whom homage is paid", title of the Javanese monarch of the Surakarta Sunanate.
  - Khosi, a king in Lesotho, Botswana and other Sotho speaking communities.
  - Eze, the Igbo word for the King or Ruler of a kingdom or city-state. It is cognate with Obi and Igwe.
  - Oba, the Yoruba word for King or Ruler of a kingdom or city-state. It is used across all the traditional Yoruba lands, as well as by the Edo, throughout Nigeria, Benin, and Togo.
    - Alaafin, or "Man of the Palace" in the Yoruba language, was the title of the ruler of the medieval Oyo Empire in northwestern Yorubaland. He is considered the supreme overlord of the empire and expected to keep tributaries safe from attack as well as mediate disputes between various kings (Obas) and their people within the Empire.
  - Kabaka, ruler of Buganda, a realm within Uganda in East Africa.
  - Omukama is a title associated with the Bunyoro-Kitara in Uganda. It is also the title of the Omukama of Toro.
  - Boqor, Somali for King. However, in practice, it is the primus inter pares or "King of Kings". The title is etymologically derived from one of the Afro-Asiatic Somali language terms for "belt", in recognition of the official's unifying role within the greater society. Furthermore, Boqor is linguistically related to the style Paqar, which was employed by rulers in the early Nile Valley state of Meroe.
  - Mwami in Rwanda and neighbouring regions in the Congo. The female counterpart is Mwamikazi.
  - Almamy, King of Futa Toro, a pre-colonial kingdom of the Toucouleur people. From the old Pulaar title "Almamy" (king).
  - Maad a Sinig, King of Sine, a pre-colonial kingdom of the Serer people. From the old Serer title "Maad" (king).
  - Maad Saloum, ruler of Saloum, a pre-colonial kingdom of the Serer people.
  - Negus, Ethiopian for king.
  - Teigne, ruler of Baol, previously a pre-colonial Serer kingdom.
  - Faama, title of the rulers of the pre-imperial Mali, meaning "king".
  - Mansa, title of the rulers of the Mali Empire
  - Omanhene or Ohene, an Akan title meaning King of the Nation, with Ohene simply meaning King. Ohemaa, the maternal counterpart (his mother, sister, aunt (referred to as a 2nd mother), cousin (referred to as sister)), has equal power and selects which son she wants to lead the people. The Akan king rules on behalf of his mother who is the true power of the land. If the Ohemaa doesn't select any male relative to lead on her behalf, then she can take the role as King or Omanhene.
  - Mwenematapa, title of the rulers of the Kingdom of Mutapa. It means "Prince of the Realm" in Shona. Also spelled Mwene Mutapa or in Portuguese transliteration Monomotapa.
  - Yang di-Pertuan Agong, the official title of the Malaysian head of state, and means "He who is Made Supreme Lord" and is generally glossed in English as "king". The officeholder is elected from among the heads of the nine royal states.
  - Lamane, "master of the land" or "chief owner of the soil" in old Serer language were the ancient hereditary kings and landed gentry of the Serer people found in Senegal, the Gambia and Mauritania. The Lamanes were guardians of Serer religion and many of them have been canonized as Holy Saints (Pangool).
  - Otumfuo, literally "the powerful one", an Akan title to mean a king. It is thought to originate with the Akan state of Akwamu. It is still used amongst the Akwamu and now the Asante people.
  - Qhapaq, written as Capac in Spanish texts, the Inca word for "king"
  - Tlahtloāni, the Classical Nahuatl term for the ruler of an āltepētl, a pre-Hispanic city-state in Mesoamerica, variously translated in English as "king," "ruler," (or "speaker" in the political sense). A cihuātlahtoāni is a female ruler, or queen regnant.
  - Irecha, title of the rulers of the Purépecha Empire

=== Princely, ducal, and other sovereign titles ===
- Grand Vizier was the title of the effective head of government (prime-minister) of many sovereign states in the Muslim world. The office of Grand Vizier was first held by officials in the later Abbasid Caliphate. It was then held in the Ottoman Empire, the Mughal Empire, the Sokoto Caliphate, the Safavid Empire and Morocco. In the Ottoman Empire, the Grand Vizier held the imperial seal and could convene all other viziers (ministers) to attend to affairs of the state; the viziers in conference were called "Kubbealtı viziers" in reference to their meeting place, the Kubbealtı ('under the dome') in Topkapı Palace. His offices were located at the Sublime Porte. Today, the Prime Minister of Pakistan is referred to in Urdu as Wazir-e-azam, which translates literally to Grand Vizier
- Khedive (/kəˈdiːv/, Ottoman Turkish: خدیو, romanized: hıdiv; Arabic: خديوي, romanized: khudaywī) was an honorific title of Persian origin used for the sultans and grand viziers of the Ottoman Empire, but most famously for the viceroy of Egypt from 1805 to 1914.
- Sovereign Duke, from the Latin Dux, meaning "leader," a military rank in the Late Roman Empire. Variant forms include Doge and Duce; it has also been modified into Archduke (meaning "chief" Duke), Grand Duke (literally "large", or "big" Duke; see above under royal titles), Vice Duke ("deputy" Duke), etc. The female equivalent is Duchess.
  - Grand Duke is considered to be part of the reigning nobility ("Royalty", in German Hochadel; their correct form of address is "Royal Highness"). The feminine form is Grand Duchess
    - Veliki Vojvoda, derived from Voievod. The title of the Bosnian Grand Duke (Serbo-Croatian: veliki vojvoda rusaga bosanskog, Latin: Bosne supremus voivoda / Sicut supremus voivoda regni Bosniae) appeared at the beginning of the 14th century as different type of this title, unique for the Bosnian medieval state. It was a court title, bestowed by the monarch to the highest military commander, usually reserved for the most influential and most capable among the highest Bosnian nobility. To interpret it as an office post rather than a court rank could be equally accurate, and although it was retained for life by a nobleman who gained it, it was not meant to be hereditary, at least not at first. However, in the last several decades of the Bosnian medieval state it became hereditary, which means it became more than just an office or a court rank.
    - Didysis Kunigaikštis, derived from kunigaikštis which itself is a derivative of kunigas (King). It was the title used in the Grand Duchy of Lithuania, also translated as "Grand Prince".
    - Archduke, ruler of an archduchy; used exclusively by the Habsburg dynasty and its junior branch of Habsburg-Lorraine which ruled the Holy Roman Empire (until 1806), the Austrian Empire (1804–1867), the Second Mexican Empire (1863–1867) and the Austro-Hungarian Empire (1867–1918) for imperial family members of the dynasty, each retaining it as a subsidiary title when founding sovereign cadet branches by acquiring thrones under different titles (e.g., Tuscany, Modena); it was also used for those ruling some Habsburg territories such as those that became the modern so-called "Benelux" nations (Belgium, Netherlands, Luxembourg); The title was created by forgery in 1358 by the Habsburgs themselves to establish a precedence of their princes over the other titleholders of high nobility of the era; therefore the rank was not recognized by the other ruling dynasties until 1453. The feminine form is Archduchess.
  - Petty king, a medieval title found predominantly in western Europe was a title of king that was subordinate to a higher sovereign or the king of a minor kingdom and not part of a larger unified state often accompanied by other small petty kingdoms.
  - Duce, an Italian dictatorial title used by Gabriele D'Annunzio and Benito Mussolini
  - Doge, elected lord and head of state in several Italian city-states
  - Ealdorman, Old English for "elder man", rendered Dux in Latin.
- Sovereign Prince, from the Latin princeps, meaning "one who takes first [place]". The feminine form is Sovereign Princess. Variant forms include the German Fürst and Russian Knyaz (князь) and the feminine form Knyaginya (княгиня). (Note: "Prince")
  - Grand Prince or Great Prince (feminine: Grand Princess or Great Princess) (Latin: Magnus Princeps; Swedish: Storfurste; German: Großfürst; Greek: Μέγας Αρχών, romanized: Megas archon, is a title of nobility ranked in honour below Emperor, equal to Archduke, King, Grand Duke and Prince-Archbishop; above a Sovereign Prince and Duke.
    - Velikiy knyaz (великий князь), ruler of a grand principality; a title primarily used in the medieval Russian principalities and claimed by the most important ruling prince, e.g. the ruler of the Grand Principality of Vladimir;
  - Elector Prince (Kurfürst in German), a rank for those who voted for the Holy Roman Emperor, usually sovereign of a state (e.g. the Margrave of Brandenburg, an elector, called the Elector of Brandenburg)
  - Datu in the Visayas and Mindanao which, together with the term Raja ( in the Rajahnate of Cebu and Kingdom of Maynila) and Lakan (title widely used on the island of Luzon), are the Filipino equivalents of "sovereign prince" and thus, glossed as "ruler". The female equivalent is a Dayang. (Cf. also Principalía – the hispanized and Christianized Datu class during the Spanish colonial period in the Philippines.)
- Nizam, the word is derived from the Arabic language Nizām (نظام), meaning order, arrangement. Nizām-ul-mulk was a title first used in Urdu around 1600 to mean Governor of the realm or Deputy for the Whole Empire.
- Despot, Greek for "lord, master", initially an appellation for the Byzantine emperor, later the senior court title, awarded to sons and close relatives of the emperor. In the 13th–15th centuries borne by autonomous and independent rulers in the Balkans. The feminine form is Despotess.
- Voievod şi domn, title held by the sovereign princes of Wallachia and Moldavia. Voievod (from Slavic) means in this context supreme military commander while Domn (from lat. dominus) means master, lord, autocrat. The "civilian" title of domn holds a kind of primacy. The office/authority is called "domnie" (roughly "lordship") rather than voievodship (as is the case of similar named but lesser Slavic titles). The prince is called upon as "doamne" ("mylord").
- Tuanku, literally "My Master" (Tuan Ku), the title of the rulers of the nine Royal states of Malaysia; all princes and princesses of the Royal Families also receive the appellation Tunku (literally "My Lord" (Tun Ku) or spelt Tengku) or Raja.
- Shogun, officially Sei-i Taishōgun (Commander-in Chief of the Expeditionary Force Against the Barbarians), the Japanese word for generalissimo, who acted as the de facto military dictators of Japan of the period spanning from 1185 to 1868.
- Emir, often rendered Amir in older English usage; from the Arabic "to command." The female form is Emira (Amirah). Emir is the root of the naval rank "Admiral". Is usually translated as prince in English.
  - Amir al-umara, Emir of Emirs.
- Mir, according to the book Persian Inscriptions on Indian Monuments, Mir is most probably an Arabized form of Pir. Pir in Old Persian and Sanskrit means the old, the wise man, the chief and the great leader. It was Arabized as Mir then, with Al(A) (Arabic definite article), it was pronounced as Amir.
  - In the Ottoman Empire, Mir-i Miran was used as the Persian equivalent to the Turkish title Beylerbey ("Bey of Beys"), alongside the Arabic equivalent Amir al-Umara ("Emir of Emirs").
- Bey, or Beg/Baig, Turkish for "Chieftain." The feminine form is Begum.
  - Beylerbey, Bey of Beys.
  - Atabeg, word is a compound of two Turkic words: ata, "ancestor", and beg or bey, "lord, leader, prince".
  - Beg Khan, concatenation of Baig and Khan.
  - Khagan Bek, title used by Khazars.
  - Derebey, feudal lord in Anatolia and the Pontic areas of Lazistan and Acara in the 18th century.
- Dey, title given to the rulers of the Regency of Algiers and Tripoli under the Ottoman Empire from 1671 onwards.
- Sardar, also spelled as Sirdar, Sardaar or Serdar, is a title of nobility (sir-, sar/sair- means "head or authority" and -dār means "holder" in Sanskrit and Avestan). The feminine form is Sardarni.
- Pati, Sanskrit for "lord, master"
  - Chhatrapati, title of the rulers of the Marathas

=== Tribal titles ===
- Cacique, derived from the Taíno word kasike, for pre-Columbian monarchs.
- Chieftain, a Lineage or Clan chief. the feminine form is Chieftainess.
- Sheikh is often used as a title for Arab royal families. It commonly designates a tribal chief, royal family member or a Muslim scholar. The feminine form is Shaykhah.
- Tadodaho, derived from the name of the first "keeper of the council fire" of the Iroquois Confederacy, Haudenosaunee, or Five Nations, refers to the individual with the highest authority in both their modern territory and their spiritual way of life.
- Taoiseach (Irish pronunciation: [ˈt̪ˠiːʃəx]) means leader. An Irish clan chief. Since 1937, this has been the title for the elected prime minister of Ireland, in both Irish and English.
- Tánaiste (Irish pronunciation: [ˈt̪ˠaːn̪ˠəʃtʲə]) is the second in command of an Irish clan. Since 1937, this has been the title in both Irish and English for the deputy head of the Irish government, nominated by the serving Taoiseach to act in that role during the Taoiseach's temporary absence.
- Tòiseach, the Scottish Gaelic for clan chief.
- Tywysog (Welsh pronunciation: [təˈwəsɔɡ]), in modern Welsh, means "Prince" and is cognate with Taoiseach and Tòiseach. Derived from the proto-Celtic *towissākos "chieftain, leader".
- Rí ruirech, "king of over-kings", or rí cóicid, a provincial King in Ireland.
- Corono, leader of a large tribe in Celtic Gallaecia. In later Latin inscriptions, they would sometimes be referred to as Princeps.
- Fon, the regional and tribal leaders in Cameroon.
- Jarl, an Old Norse title for a chieftain in Scandinavia during the Viking and Middle Ages.
- Odikro, an Akan chieftain. Obahemaa female maternal counterpart.
- Lonko, chief of several Mapuche communities.
- Ratu, a Fijian chiefly title that is also found in Javanese culture.
- Aliʻi nui, was the supreme monarch of various Hawaiian islands. They are the supreme high chiefs (chief of chiefs). This title would later be used by rulers of the entire Hawaiian chain of islands.
- Ajaw, in Maya meaning "lord", "ruler", "king" or "leader". Was the title of the ruler in the Classic Maya polity. A variant being the title of K'inich Ajaw or "Great Sun King" as it was used to refer to the founder of the Copán dynasty, K'inich Yax K'uk' Mo'. The female equivalent is a Ix-ajaw.
  - Kaloomte, in Maya meaning "high king" or "emperor".
- Halach Uinik, in Maya meaning "real man", "person of fact" or "person of command". Was the title of the ruler in the Post-Classic Maya polity (Kuchkabal).

=== Religious titles ===
- Pope, also "Supreme Pontiff of the Universal Church and Vicar of Christ", is considered the apostolic successor of Saint Peter, one of the Twelve Apostles (primary disciples) of Jesus Christ. Once wielding substantial secular power as the ruler of the Papal States and leader of Christendom, the Pope is also the absolute ruler of the sovereign state Vatican City. Also the title of the leader of the Coptic Church, considered to be the successor of the Apostle Saint Mark the Evangelist. The word pope is derived from Latin and Italian papa, a familiar form of "father".
  - Pontifex maximus, formerly one of the titles of the Roman emperors
- Catholicos is the Chief Bishop, Patriarch of the Armenian Orthodox Church. The earliest ecclesiastical use of the title Catholicos was by the Bishop of Armenia, head of the Armenian Orthodox Apostolic Church, in the 4th century.
- Patriarch is the highest ecclesial title used in the Eastern Christian tradition. Some patriarchs are also styled as popes.
- Caliph means 'successor' (to Muhammad), both a religious and a secular leader. The ruler of the caliphate was the secular head of the international Muslim community, as a nation. To claim the Caliphate was, theoretically, to claim stewardship over Muslims on earth, under the sovereignty of Allah. (See Amir al-Mu'minin above). This did not necessarily mean that the Caliph was himself the supreme authority on Islamic law or theology; that still fell to the Ulema. The role of the Caliph was to oversee and take responsibility for the Muslim community's political and governmental needs (both within and beyond the borders of his territorial realm), rather than to himself determine matters of doctrine.
  - Amir al-Mu'minin, or "Commander (Emir) of the Faithful," a title traditionally held by the Caliphs of Islam to denote their suzerainty over all Muslims, even (theoretically) those beyond their territorial borders. Currently, the King of Morocco and the Sultan of Sokoto hold this title, although neither officially claims the Caliphate.
- Imam, Imam (/ɪˈmɑːm/; Arabic: إمام imām; plural: أئمة aʼimmah) is an Islamic leadership position. For Sunni Muslims, Imam is most commonly used as the title of a worship leader of a mosque. In this context, imams may lead Islamic worship services, lead prayers, serve as community leaders, and provide religious guidance. Thus for Sunnis, anyone can study the basic Islamic sciences and become an Imam
- Dalai Lama, the highest authority in Tibetan (or more specifically Gelug) Buddhism and a symbol of the unification of Tibet, said to belong to a line of reincarnations of the bodhisattva Avalokitesvara. Among other incarnate Tibetan lamas, the second highest Gelug prelate is the Panchen Lama. From the time of the Fifth Dalai Lama until 1950, the Dalai Lamas effectively ruled Tibet. The chief of the rival Kagyu school of Tibetan Buddhism is the Karmapa.
- Saltigue, the high priests and priestesses of the Serer people. They are the diviners in the Serer religion.
- Jathedar, a title of a Sikh general, commander, the leader of a Jatha or Takht, literally means "holder of troops". The feminine form is Jathedarni.

=== Dual titles ===
- Emperor at home, king abroad
- King-Emperor, is a sovereign ruler who is simultaneously a king of one territory and emperor of another.
  - Imperial and Royal / Imperial–royal
- King-Grand Duke
- King in Prussia

== Other sovereigns, royalty, peers, and major nobility ==
Several ranks were widely used (for more than a thousand years in Europe alone) for both sovereign rulers and non-sovereigns. Additional knowledge about the territory and historic period is required to know whether the rank holder was a sovereign or non-sovereign. However, joint precedence among rank holders often greatly depended on whether a rank holder was sovereign, whether of the same rank or not. This situation was most widely exemplified by the Holy Roman Empire (HRE) in Europe. Several of the following ranks were commonly both sovereign and non-sovereign within the HRE. Outside of the HRE, the most common sovereign rank of these below was that of Prince. Within the HRE, those holding the following ranks who were also sovereigns had (enjoyed) what was known as an immediate relationship with the Emperor. Those holding non-sovereign ranks held only a mediate relationship (meaning that the civil hierarchy upwards was mediated by one or more intermediaries between the rank holder and the Emperor).

=== Titles ===
- Prince (Prinz in German), junior members of a royal, grand ducal, ruling ducal or princely, or mediatised family. The title of Fürst was usually reserved, from the 19th century, for rulers of principalities—the smallest sovereign entities (e.g., Liechtenstein, Lippe, Schwarzburg, Waldeck-and-Pyrmont)—and for heads of high-ranking, noble but non-ruling families (Bismarck, Clary und Aldringen, Dietrichstein, Henckel von Donnersmarck, Kinsky, Paar, Pless, Thun und Hohenstein, etc.). Cadets of these latter families were generally not allowed to use Prinz, being accorded only the style of count (Graf) or, occasionally, that of Fürst (Wrede, Urach) even though it was also a ruling title. Exceptional use of Prinz was permitted for some morganatic families (e.g., Battenberg, Montenuovo) and a few others (Carolath-Beuthen, Biron von Kurland). Prince is also used as the highest, non-royal title of nobility in instances such as that of Prince Bernadotte where Swedish royal princes lost those titles due to unapproved marriages. The feminine form is Princess.
  - In particular, Crown Prince (Kronprinz in German) was reserved for the heir apparent of an emperor or king. The feminine form is Crown Princess.
  - Grand Prince (Velikiy knyaz), ruler of a grand principality; a title primarily used in the medieval Russian principalities and claimed by the most important ruling prince; It was also used by the Romanovs of the Russian Empire for members of the imperial family. The feminine form is Grand Princess.
  - Great Prince, a variation of Grand Prince, the feminine form is Great Princess.
  - Ban, noble title used in several states in both Central Europe and Southeastern Europe between the 7th century and the 20th century.
  - Dauphin, title of the heir apparent of the royal family of France, as he was the de jure ruler of the Dauphiné province in today's southeastern France (under the authority of the King)
  - Infante, title of the cadet members of the royal families of Portugal and Spain. The feminine form is Infanta.
  - Prince Royal was the title held by the heir apparent or the heir presumptive to the throne of the Kingdom of Portugal
  - Mexican Prince was the title created on June 22, 1822 by the Mexican Constituent Congress during the First Mexican Empire, to be granted to legitimate children who were not the heir or firstborn of the Emperor Agustín de Iturbide. Later, his grandsons were given the titles Prince of Iturbide by Emperor Maximilian I of Mexico.
  - Królewicz, title used by the children of the monarchs of Poland and the later Polish–Lithuanian Commonwealth
  - Ōji (王子), Japanese, literally "sovereign-child", used only for the son of a monarch.
  - Rajkumar, the Indian title for prince, the feminine form is Rajkumari.
  - Shahzada, Persian for prince, the feminine form is Shahzadi.
  - Yuvaraja, is an Indian title for crown prince, literally "young king", the heir apparent to the throne of a kingdom. The feminine is Yuvarani.
  - Buumi, first in line to the throne in Serer pre-colonial kingdoms. The second in line is called a Thilas, whereas the third in line is known as a Loul.
  - Bai, Filipino feminine equivalent of a prince.
  - Ampuan, Maranao royal title which literally means "The One to whom one asks for apology"
  - Ginoo, Ancient Filipino equivalent to noble man or prince (now used in the form "Ginoóng" as the analogue to "mister").
  - Pillai, Ancient South Indian title meaning "child", Prince for junior children of Emperors
  - Morza, a Tatar title usually translated as "prince", it ranked below a Khan. The title was borrowed from Persian and Indian appellation Mirza added to the names of certain nobles, which itself derived from Emir.
  - Daakyehene, pronounced: Daa-chi-hi-ni, literally: future king. The feminine form is Daakyehemaa. An Akan prince.
  - Knyaz, a title found in most Slavic languages, denoting a ruling or noble rank. It is usually translated into English as "Prince", but the word is related to the English King and the German König. Also translated as Herzog (Duke).
- Daimyo title of powerful Japanese magnates, feudal lords of medieval and early modern Japan.
- Duke (Herzog in German), ruler of a duchy; (Note: A duke who is not actually or formerly sovereign, or a member of a reigning or formerly reigning dynasty, such as British, French, Portuguese, Spanish and most Italian dukes, is a non-dynastic noble ranking above a marquis.) also for junior members of ducal and some grand ducal families. The feminine form is Duchess.
  - Babu, Indian title, equivalent of Duke, feminine is Babuain
- Marquess, Margrave, or Marquis (literally "Count of a March" (=Border territory)) was the ruler of a marquessate, margraviate, or march. The female equivalent is Marchioness, Margravine, or Marquise.
  - Grand Župan, a more influential Župan.
  - Landgrave (literally "Land Count"), a German title, ruler of a landgraviate (large / provincial territory).
- Count, theoretically the ruler of a county; known as an Earl in modern Britain; known as a Graf in German, known as Conde in Spain and Mexico, known as a Serdar in Montenegro and Serbia. The female equivalent is Countess, which in Britain also refers to an earl's wife.
  - Župan, noble and administrative title used in several states in Central and Southeastern Europe between the 7th century and the 21st century.
  - Ispán, leader of a castle district (a fortress and the royal lands attached to it) in the Kingdom of Hungary from the early 11th century.
- Viscount (vice-count), theoretically the ruler of a viscounty, which did not develop into a hereditary title until much later. The female equivalent is Viscountess. In the case of French viscounts and viscountesses, it is customary to leave the titles untranslated as vicomte [vikɔ̃t] and vicomtesse [vikɔ̃tɛs].
  - Burgrave, or Burggraf ("count of a burg"). In the Low Countries, the ruler of a major city or deputy to a count, usually in charge of managing the court and administrative affairs.
- Castellan, or Châtelain, "holder of a castle".
  - Kiladar was a title for the governor of a fort or large town in early modern India. Had the same functions as that of a European feudal Castellan
- Sahib, title of Arabic origin meaning "companion." The feminine form is Sahiba.
- Baron, theoretically the ruler of a barony – some barons in some countries may have been "free barons" (liber baro) and as such, regarded (themselves) as higher barons. The female equivalent is Baroness.
  - Freiherr, a German word meaning literally "Free Master" or "Free Lord" (i.e. not subdued to feudal chores or drudgery), is the German equivalent of the English term "Baron", with the important difference that unlike the British Baron, he is not a "Peer of the Realm" (member of the high aristocracy). The female equivalent is Freifrau.
  - Heer, a Dutch word meaning "lord", when used before and during the Dutch Republic, refers to the feudal lords that ran the countryside on behalf of the counts. Untitled descendants, male and female, of this old nobility (Dutch:oude adel) use the title "Jonkheer/Jonkvrouw", and after the establishment of the Kingdom of the Netherlands sometimes "Baron/Baroness", before the given and surname following the German practice for Freiherr. Also like the German practice, females inherit the title, but cannot pass it down.
  - Primor, a Hungarian noble title, originally the highest rank of Székely nobility, usually compared to baron (or less commonly, count). Originally, primores could de jure not be evicted from his fiefdom, even by the King of Hungary (although such instances did occur).
  - Zamindar were considered to be equivalent to lords and barons; in some cases they were independent sovereign princes. The feminine form is Zamindarni.
  - Jagirdar, also spelled as Jageerdar (Devanagari: जागीर, Persian: جاگیر, ja- meaning "place", -gir meaning "keeping, holding"). Indian title for the ruler of a jagir (fief) The feminine form is Jagirdarni.
  - Principal, a person belonging to the aristocratic ruling class of Filipino nobles called Principalía, roughly equivalent to ancient Roman Patricians, through whom the Spanish Monarchs ruled the Philippines during the colonial period (c. 1600s to 1898). The feminine form is Principala.
  - Regents: A regent (from Latin regens: ruling, governing) is a person appointed to govern a state pro tempore (Latin: 'for the time being') because the monarch is a minor, absent, incapacitated or unable to discharge the powers and duties of the monarchy, or the throne is vacant and the new monarch has not yet been determined. The rule of a regent or regents is called a regency. A regent or regency council may be formed ad hoc or in accordance with a constitutional rule. Regent is sometimes a formal title granted to a monarch's most trusted advisor or personal assistant. If the regent is holding their position due to their position in the line of succession, the compound term prince regent is often used; if the regent of a minor is their mother, she would be referred to as queen regent.

== Minor nobility, landed gentry, and other aristocracy ==
The distinction between the ranks of the major nobility (listed above) and the minor nobility, listed here, was not always a sharp one in all nations. But the precedence of the ranks of a baronet or a knight is quite generally accepted for where this distinction exists for most nations. Here the rank of baronet (ranking above a knight) is taken as the highest rank among the ranks of the minor nobility or landed gentry that are listed below.

=== Titles ===
- Baronet is a hereditary title ranking below baron but above knight; this title is granted only in the United Kingdom and is variously considered to be "the head of the nobiles minores" or "the lowest of the nobiles majores" of that country. The feminine form is Baronetess.
- Dominus was the Latin title of the feudal, superior and mesne, lords, and also an ecclesiastical and academical title (equivalent of Lord)
- Vidame, a minor French aristocrat
- Vavasour, also a petty French feudal lord
- Seigneur or Lord of the manor rules a smaller local fief
- Captal, archaic Gascon title equivalent to seigneur
- Knight is the central rank of the Medieval aristocratic system in Europe (and having its equivalents elsewhere), usually ranking at or near the top of the minor nobility in most areas. However, before the 18th century in the Low Countries of the Holy Roman Empire, the knights (ridderen) were major nobility, ranking above the heren (equivalent to feudal barons and lords of the manor, depending on the size of the estate) and directly below the head of state.
- Patrician is a dignity of minor nobility or landed gentry (most often being hereditary) usually ranking below Knight but above Esquire
- Fidalgo or Hidalgo is a minor Portuguese and Spanish aristocrat (respectively; from filho d'algo / hijo de algo, lit. "son of something")
- Nobile is an Italian title of nobility for prestigious families that never received a title
- Edler is a minor aristocrat in Germany and Austria during those countries' respective imperial periods.
- Jonkheer is an honorific for members of the Dutch nobility who do not currently hold a title. An untitled noblewoman is styled Jonkvrouw, though the wife of a Jonkheer is a Mevrouw or, sometimes, Freule, which could also be used by daughters of the same.
- Junker is a German noble honorific, meaning "young nobleman" or otherwise "young lord".
- Reis is an obscure aristocratic title from the coastlines of Lebanon and Syria that is roughly equivalent to a baron. The word itself can be translated as "Commodore", and is found only among a few of the former "Merchant Aristocrat" houses of the former Mount Lebanon Emirate. The only legitimate holders of this title are those that trace their lineage back to vassals of Fakhr al-Din II that arrived from Italy via the alliance with the Medici.
- Skartabel is a minor Polish aristocrat.
- Scottish Baron is a hereditary noble dignity, outside the Scots peerage, recognised by Lord Lyon as a member of the Scots noblesse and ranking below a Lord of Parliament but above a Scottish Laird (Note: There are actually five dignities in the Baronage of Scotland that are types of a Scottish Baron; these are (in ascending order of rank): Baron, Lord, Earl, Marquis and Duke (the general name for the dignity listed above among the ranks of aristocratic gentry).) in the British system. However, Scottish Barons on the European continent are considered and treated equal to European barons.
- Laird is a Scottish hereditary feudal dignity ranking below a Scottish Baron but above an Esquire
- Esquire is a rank of gentry originally derived from Squire and indicating the status of an attendant to a knight, an apprentice knight, or a manorial lord; it ranks below Knight (or in Scotland below Laird) but above Gentleman. (Note: The meaning of the title Esquire became (and remains) quite diffuse, and may indicate anything from no aristocratic status, to some official government civil appointment, or (more historically) the son of a knight or noble who had no other title above just Gentleman.) (Note: In the United States, where there is no nobility, the title esquire is sometimes arrogated (without any governmental authorization) by lawyers admitted to the state bar.)
- Gentleman is the basic rank of landed gentry (ranking below Esquire), historically primarily associated with land; within British Commonwealth nations it is also roughly equivalent to some minor nobility of some of the continental European nations The feminine form is Gentlewoman
- Bibi, means Miss in Urdu and is frequently used as a respectful title for women in South Asia when added to the given name.
- Lord, a title of the peerage in the United Kingdom, or used for people entitled to courtesy titles. The collective "Lords" can refer to a group or body of peers, the feminine is Lady.
- Lalla, is an Amazigh title of respect. The title is a prefix to her given name or personal name, and is used by females usually of noble or royal background.
- Samurai, the hereditary military nobility and officer caste of medieval and early-modern Japan.
- Jizamurai, (samurai of the land) lower-ranking provincial samurai and petty nobility. The term was rather broad and could also refer to non-noble independent peasant landowners.
- Sidi, is a masculine title of respect, meaning "my master" in Maltese, Darija and Egyptian Arabic.
- Dvoryanin, the word (Russian: Дворянин, romanized: Member of the court); a member of Russian nobility.

== Further information by country ==
=== English titles ===
During the Middle Ages, in England, as in most of Europe, the feudal system was the dominant social and economic system. Under the feudal system, the monarch would grant land to the monarch's loyal subjects in exchange for the subject's loyalty and military service when called by the monarch. Besides grants of land, these subjects were usually given titles that implied nobility and rank, such as duke, earl, baron, etc., which were passed down through the holder's male line. Barons were the lowest rank of nobility and were granted small parcels of land. Earls were the next highest rank with larger land holdings. Dukes were the highest rank and held the largest holdings, known as duchies. The monarch was the ultimate authority and was able to grant and revoke titles.

An English peerage began to emerge as a separate entity from the feudal system in the 14th century. The peers held titles granted by the monarch, but did not necessarily hold any land or have any feudal obligations. The peerage was divided into five ranks; from highest to lowest: duke, marquess, earl, viscount, and baron.

The peerage system became more formalized over time. By the 18th century, peerages were no longer granted as a reward for military service, but instead were granted as a way to recognize social status and political influence.

Today, there are two types of peerages in England: hereditary and life peerages. Hereditary peerages are those that are passed down through the male line of the family. In contrast, life peerages are granted to an individual for their lifetime only, without any succession to heirs. Life peerages were relatively rare before 1958, and were held to entitle the bearer to sit in the House of Lords. Since the Life Peerages Act 1958, nearly all new peerages are life baronies.

In addition to peerages, there are also a number of other titles in England, such as "knight" and "dame", granted by the monarch without hereditary succession.

=== In German-speaking states ===
The actual rank of a title-holder in German-speaking states depended not only on the nominal rank of the title, but also the degree of sovereignty exercised, the rank of the title-holder's suzerain, and the length of time the family possessed its status within the nobility (Uradel, Briefadel, altfürstliche, neufürstliche, see: German nobility). Thus, any reigning sovereign ranks higher than any deposed or mediatized sovereign (e.g., the Fürst of Waldeck, sovereign until 1918, was higher than the Duke of Arenberg, head of a mediatized family, although Herzog is nominally a higher title than Fürst). However, former holders of higher titles in extant monarchies retained their relative rank, i.e., a queen dowager of Belgium outranks the reigning Prince of Liechtenstein.

A queen dowager is the widow of a king;

a queen mother is the mother of a reigning sovereign.

A queen emerita is a title given to a former queen consort who has retired following the abdication of her husband.

Members of a formerly sovereign or mediatized house rank higher than the nobility. Among the nobility, those whose titles derive from the Holy Roman Empire rank higher than the holder of an equivalent title granted by one of the German monarchs after 1806.

The constitution of the Weimar Republic in 1919 ceased to accord privileges to members of dynastic and noble families. Their titles henceforth became legal parts of the family name, and traditional forms of address (e.g., "Hoheit" or "Durchlaucht") ceased to be accorded to them by governmental entities. The last title was conferred on 12 November 1918 to Kurt von Kleefeld.

In Austria, nobility titles may no longer be used since 1918.

== Informal use of titles as honorifics ==
Royal and aristocratic titles are widely used informally as honorifics:

- in jazz: King, Queen, Prince, Maharaja, Count, Duke;
- in popular music, King, Prince;
- in French newspapers of the 20th century for various arts: princes of poetry (Paul Fort), song (Xavier Privas), humor (Gabriel de Lautrec), storytelling (Henry Nor), vaudeville (Georges Feydeau), terror (André de Lorde), gastronomy (Curnonsky).

== See also ==
- Clergy
- Courtesy title
- Ecclesiastical Addresses
- False titles of nobility
- Forms of address in the United Kingdom
- Nobiliary particle
- Petty kingdom
- Prince of the church
- Royal and noble styles
- Subsidiary title
- Substantive title
