= Cromar (disambiguation) =

Cromar may refer to:

== People ==
- Bert Cromar (1931-2007), Scottish amateur footballer
- James Cromar Watt (1862-1942), Scottish artist, architect, and jeweller
- John Cromar, (1859/1860-1942), Scottish-Australian seaman and author

== Places ==
- Cromar, an area in Aberdeenshire

== Other ==
- Baron of Cromar, a title in the Baronage of Scotland
