= Burgh of barony =

Formerly a type of Scottish town

A burgh of barony was a type of Scottish town (burgh).

Burghs of barony were distinct from royal burghs, as the title was granted to a landowner who, as a tenant-in-chief, held his estates directly from the crown. (In some cases, they might also be burghs of regality where the crown granted to lords of regality, who were leading noblemen, judicial powers to try criminals for all offences except treason). They were created between 1450 and 1846, and conferred upon the landowner the right to hold weekly markets. Unlike royal burghs, they were not allowed to participate in foreign trade. In practice very few burghs of barony developed into market towns.

Over 300 such burghs were created: the last was Ardrossan in 1846. From 1833 inhabitants of such burghs could form a police burgh governed by elected commissioners. In some cases the existing burgh continued to exist alongside the police burgh. Remaining burghs of barony were abolished in 1893 by the Burgh Police (Scotland) Act 1892 (55 & 56 Vict. c. 55). Where a police burgh had been formed it absorbed the burgh of barony, in other cases the burgh was dissolved. From that date there was no practical difference between burghs of barony and other police burghs, though a distinction was still sometimes made. For instance, in 1957 Lord Lyon introduced distinctive "burghal coronets" to be displayed above the arms of burghs matriculated by his office: a "coronet suitable to a burgh of barony" was a red mural crown, whereas that for a police burgh was blue in colour.

All burghs were abolished in 1975 by the Local Government (Scotland) Act 1973. However, feudal titles (such as baronies, lordships and earldoms) formally attached to the lands have been preserved (section 63 of Abolition of Feudal Tenure etc. (Scotland) Act 2000), and are still recognised by the British crown today.

== See also ==
- List of burghs in Scotland
