= Barony =

Barony may refer to:

- Barony, the peerage of, office of, or territory held by, a baron.
- Barony, the title and land held in fealty by a feudal baron.
- Barony (county division), a type of administrative or geographical division in parts of the British Isles
  - Barony (Ireland), a historical subdivision of an Irish county
- Barony (role-playing game), a 1990 tabletop RPG
- Barony Parish, a former civil and ecclesiastic parish in Lanarkshire, Scotland, absorbed into Townhead district, Glasgow, where landmarks still recall the parish (Barony Church, Barony Hall, etc.)

== See also ==
- Baron
- Baronet
- Baronage
