= Baronage =

Title of peerage

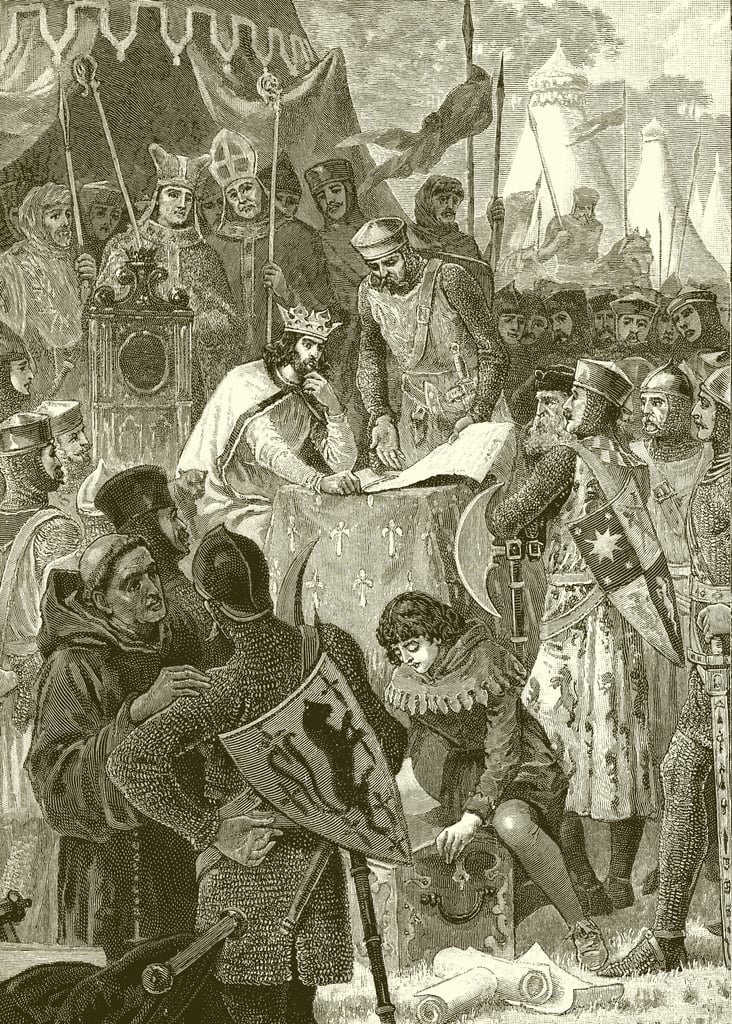
King John signs Magna Carta at Runnymede in 1215, surrounded by his baronage. Illustration from Cassell's History of England, 1902.

In England, the baronage was the collectively inclusive term denoting all members of the feudal nobility, as observed by the constitutional authority Edward Coke. It was replaced eventually by the term peerage.

== Origin ==
The term originated at a time when the feudal baron was the only substantive degree of nobility. The feudal baron held his lands directly from the king as a tenant-in-chief by the feudal land tenure. This gave him the obligation to provide knights and troops for the royal feudal army. Barons could hold other executive offices apart from the duties they owed the king, such as an earldom, though immediately after the Norman Conquest of 1066, very few barons did. An Earl, at the time, was the highest executive office concerned with shire administration, holding higher responsibilities than the sheriff, whose title would later evolve into a Viscount.

The privilege attached was the right, indeed the obligation, to attend the king in his feudal court, termed the Council de Baronage, a precursor to the modern Parliament, in order to advise and support him.

== Evolution of the title ==
The executive duties of the earldom eventually became redundant as the office became absorbed into that of the sheriff, so the title of earl became a noble and honorary title above 'baron'. Other baronages evolved similarly, until the title itself eventually became 'peerages' to recognise their contemporary equality under the monarch and effectively declining privileges.

The use of the barony continues into the 21st century, so all members of the peerage are barons. Commoners are not elevated directly to the nobility without also being a baron; the commoner Admiral John Jervis was elevated to the peerage in 1797 as Earl St Vincent, as well as being created the Baron Jervis, and former British prime minister Harold Macmillan, when elevated to an earldom, was also created a baron simultaneously. However, in both cases the barony is itself submerged within its higher title. The heir apparent may also take a seat in the House of Lords by writ of acceleration if suitable. A peerage may also be used without any legal or political substance as a courtesy title by the eldest son of an earl or higher noble.

== Baronage of Scotland ==
In Scotland, its baronage the Baronage of Scotland continues to this day comprising around 350 barons, who in most cases bear titles within the ancient nobility of Scotland granted prior to the 1707 Act of Union. In addition, there are seven baronage earldoms (Arran, Breadalbane, Crawfurd-Lindsay, Errol, Nithsdale, Rothes, Wigtoun), one baronage marquisate (Huntly) and one baronage dukedom (Hamilton), all held in baroneum, where there is entitlement. Of these, four of the earldoms are extant, two are unclaimed, one is in dispute, the marquisate is extant held by a non-peer and the dukedom is held by a senior member of the Scottish peerage. Such nobles bear the honorific "The Much Honoured" (The Much Hon.) before their titles.

== Sources ==
- Encyclopædia Britannica, 9th. ed., vol. 3, p. 387-8, Baron

== See also ==
- Peerage
- English feudal barony
- Convocation of the English Clergy
