= Scottish Barony Register =

Non-statutory register of baronies

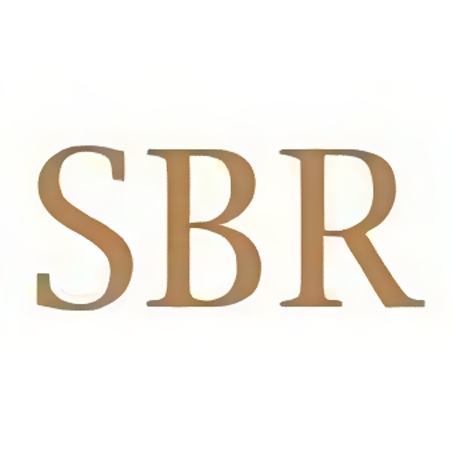

Non-statutory register overview
- Formed: 2004
- Jurisdiction: Scotland
- Headquarters: Princes Exchange, 1 Earl Grey Street, Edinburgh EH3 9EE
- Non-statutory register executive: Alastair Kennedy Shepherd, Custodian of the Register
- Website: scottishbaronyregister.org

The Scottish Barony Register is a non-statutory register established and maintained by legal professionals in Scotland. It was incorporated as a private company limited by guarantee, registered under the number SC276349. Since November 2021, the Custodian has been Alastair Shepherd, a retired solicitor and a Writer to His Majesty's Signet, who succeeded Alistair Rennie in the post.

== History ==
Prior to 2000, Scotland had not adopted the "severance of title" doctrine that England had. Through the generations, as a barony (title in land and title of nobility) was passed from one person to the next, the barony had to be confirmed by the crown. As government administration and record-keeping advanced, Parliament recognized that land records (without more) provided a chain of succession to a barony and, in the 1800s, relieved the crown of the burden to confirm baronies.

The Abolition of Feudal Tenure etc. (Scotland) Act 2000 severed feudal titles into separate land titles and personal dignities, which took effect in 2004. While Scottish land law provided for recording the chain of succession of land titles, the act did not provide for recording the chain of succession of personal dignities. Without a clear chain of succession, questions arose as to how the Lord Lyon King of Arms might establish jurisdiction over an individual so as to grant a coat of arms. Thus, in 2004, members of the Scottish legal community, learned in feudal law, formed the Scottish Barony Register to maintain a record of baronies. Upon certification by Scottish Baronry Register and upon sufficient evidence provided by the individual, the Lord Lyon will determine its jurisdiction to grant arms.

== Purpose ==
The Scottish Barony Register serves as a source of information regarding the ownership of dignities in the Baronage of Scotland. It addresses a previous gap in available knowledge by providing a record of ownership rights for titles such as baronies, lordships, and earldoms, particularly in relation to heraldic grants issued by the Lord Lyon.

As of January 2024, the Scottish Barony Register contains a total of 188 registered dignities, predominantly baronies.

== See also ==
- Baronage of Scotland
