= Duguid =

Duguid (/ˈdjuːɡɪd/ DEW-ghid) is a Scottish surname, most likely derived from a nickname for a well-intentioned person, from the Middle English du ('do') and gu(i)d ('good'). Notable people with the surname include:

- Andy Duguid (born 1982), German-Scottish DJ and producer
- Archer Fortescue Duguid (1887–1976), Scottish-Canadian historian
- Brad Duguid (born 1962), Canadian politician
- Charles Duguid (1884–1986), Scottish-born Australian Aboriginal rights campaigner
- Chris Duguid (born 1977), Australian cyber security practitioner
- Dale Duguid, Australian visual effects supervisor and producer
- David Duguid (1832–1907), Scottish cabinet-maker and medium
- David Duguid (born 1970), British politician
- Don Duguid (1935–2026), Canadian curler
- Gerry Duguid (1929–1993), Canadian football player
- Ian Duguid (born 1960), British theologian
- Irvin Duguid (born 1969), Scottish musician
- Jim Duguid, Scottish musician
- Karl Duguid (born 1978), English football player
- Lorne Duguid (1910–1981), Canadian ice hockey player
- Naomi Duguid (born 1950), Canadian food writer
- Nigel Duguid (born 1969), West Indian cricket umpire
- Terry Duguid (born 1954 or 1955), Canadian politician
- William Duguid Geddes (1828–1900), Scottish scholar

== Others ==
- Facebook v. Duguid, a 2021 U.S. Supreme Court case
- Auchenhove Castle, castle ruins in Aberdeenshire, Scotland
