= Baron of Cromar =

Was a title of nobility in the Baronage of Scotland

Baron of Cromar was a title in the Baronage of Scotland. It was a feudal barony with its caput baronium at Migvie Castle in Aberdeenshire, Scotland. The Earls of Mar held the barony until transferred to the Duke of Fife.
