= The Much Honoured =

Honorific bestowed on minor nobles in Scotland

The Much Honoured (abbreviated to The Much Hon.) is an honorific style applied to various nobles in Scotland, including Scots barons.

== Overview ==
There were around 350 identifiable local baronies in Scotland by the early fifteenth century and these could mostly be mapped against local parish boundaries. In addition, there are a small number of extant baronage earldoms in the Baronage of Scotland (Aboyne, Arran, Breadalbane, Crawfurd-Lindsay, Errol, Lennox, Orkney, Rothes, Wigtoun), one extant baronage marquisate (Huntly) and one extant baronage dukedom (Hamilton). Since all these titles are personal titles based in Scots property law and not peerages, two different persons can hold the peerage title and the baronage title. The peerage title descends according to the destination in the letters patent of creation of the peerage and the rules of peerage law, while the baronage title can be bought, sold, gifted or bequeathed under Scots property law.

== Usage ==
Historically, the honorific is used in association with five groups:

- Scottish barons. For example, The Much Hon. David Leslie, Baron of Leslie.
- Lords in the Baronage of Scotland (not to be confused with lairds). For example, The Much Hon. David Leslie, Lord of Leslie.
- Earls/marquises/dukes in the Baronage of Scotland. For example, The Much Hon. James Leslie, Earl of Rothes.
- Clan chiefs/chieftains or lairds who are recognised in a territorial designation by the Lord Lyon. For example, The Much Hon. Catherine Maxwell-Stuart, Lady of Traquair.
- It has been said that usage of The Much Honoured can be extended to English Lords of the Manor.

== See also ==
- Forms of address in the United Kingdom
- Style (form of address)
- The Honourable
