= Scottish feudal barony of Lenzie =

The feudal barony of Lenzie was a feudal barony with its caput baronium at an unknown location in East Dunbartonshire, Scotland. The barony was granted to William Comyn, Baron Lenzie in 1170. After the Comyns were disinherited by King Robert the Bruce, the barony was given to the Fleming family after 1306.
