= Baron of Loudoun =

Baron of Loudoun is a title of nobility in the Baronage of Scotland for the holder of the barony with its caput baronium at Loudoun Castle in Ayrshire, Scotland. The Loudouns of Loudoun held the barony prior to passing via marriage to the Crauford family whom held the barony, then the Campbells of Loudoun held the lands via marriage.
