= Burgh of regality =

Scottish administrative division

A burgh of regality is a type of Scottish town.

They were distinct from royal burghs as they were granted to "lords of regality", leading noblemen. (In distinction, burghs of barony were granted to a tenant-in-chief, a landowner who held his estates directly from the crown, and had fewer civil and criminal law powers). They were created between 1450 and 1707, and conferred upon the landowner varying trading rights, such as the right to hold weekly markets or to trade overseas.

Burghs of regality possessed higher jurisdictional rights in liberam regalitatem, amounting to complete criminal jurisdiction except for treason. These rights were abolished by the Heritable Jurisdictions (Scotland) Act 1746, after which the burghs enjoyed only the jurisdictional rights of burghs of barony.

== See also ==
- Burgh, borough, and ancient borough
- List of burghs in Scotland
- Kilwinning Abbey
- Lords of Regality
