= Baron of Newton =

Title of nobility in the Baronage of Scotland

- Arms of Much Hon. Philip, Baron of Newton
- Creation date: 1685
- Creation: Baronage of Scotland
- Created by: Charles I
- First holder: Edward Wright, 1st Baron of Newton
- Present holder: Philip David Pickering, 13th Baron of Newton
- Heir apparent: Joanne Alexandra Costas, Maid of Newton
- Status: extant
- Motto: Viator Orbis
- Arms: Argent, on a base undy Azure and Argent a sailing ship with three masts in full sail Proper pennons flying Gules on a Chief Azure three fleur-de-lys Or..

Baron of Newton is a title of nobility in the Baronage of Scotland.

== John Wright ==
According to the Retours for Stirlingshire, number 321, John Wright, second son of the late Edward Wright advocate, was served heir to his brother Edward Wright eldest son of Edward Wright advocate, in the barony of Newton, on 16 December 1695. John Wright extended his property in Stirlingshire when on 2 January 1702 he was granted the lands and barony of Kersey (Kerse). Kersey seems to have been transferred to his younger brother Richard sometime before 1710 as in that year he, Richard Wright of Kersey took action in the Court of Session, Scotland's highest civil court, against the creditors of Bruce of Newton. During the 1720s and 1730s there were several cases before Court of Session concerning Richard Wright of Kersey.

== Richard Wright ==
Richard Wright of Kersey was served heir to his brother John Wright of Kersey, who died in March 1714, in half of Newton and Newton of Bothkennar and in the Grange and Mains of Bothkennar, also in the lands and barony of Kersey with salmon fishing in the River Forth, Stirlingshire, 2 February 1733.

== Lawrence Dundas (1712–1781) ==
Thomas Dundas of Fingask, Perthshire, and his wife Bethia Baillie, daughter of John Baillie of Castlecary, Stirlingshire, had two sons namely Thomas Dundas of Fingask and Carron Hall, and Lawrence Dundas of Kerse. Lawrence, born in 1712, became Sir Lawrence Dundas baronet, a Member of Parliament for Linlithgow burghs from 1747 to 1748, a Privy Councillor in 1771, Vice Admiral of Shetland and Orkney, Commissary General and a contractor to the British Army from 1748 to 1759, was created a baronet 16 November 1762. Sir Laurence Dundas of Kerse received several grants during the 1760s and 1770s including Seabegs in 1764, parts of Kerse in 1766, Abbotskerse in 1772, West Kerse in 1773, also Clackmannan in 1763, and Denboig 1766. He also acquired the lands and barony of Newton around this period. All these properties were in the Forth Valley an area which was rapidly industrialising.

== Lawrence Dundas (1766–1839) ==
Lawrence Dundas, born 10 April 1766, he became Lord Lieutenant and Vice Admiral of Orkney and Shetland, Lord Mayor of York, and was created Earl of Zetland on 2 July 1838. The Honourable Laurence Dundas, eldest son of Thomas, Lord Dundas, was granted Kerse on 5 July 1806. [RGS.136.164/207] He was the husband of Harriot, daughter of General John Hale. On his death on 19 February 1839 he was succeeded by his son Thomas as 2nd Earl of Zetland.

== Philip David Pickering ==
The rights and title of the Barony of Newton were passed to Philip David Pickering in December 2011 [SBR 2012/1] as the 13th Baron of Newton.
