= Baron of Rannoch =

Dormant nobility title in the Baronage of Scotland

Barony of Rannoch
- Creation date: 1502
- Creation: Baronage of Scotland
- Created by: James IV
- First holder: Sir Robert Menzies of that Ilk, Baron of Rannoch
- Status: extant

Baron of Rannoch is a title of nobility in the Baronage of Scotland.

King James IV, granted the lands of Rannoch, which lies in highland Perthshire, and its neighbouring forest, loch and islands, to Sir Robert Menzies of that Ilk (1475-1557) as the free barony of Rannoch on 1 Sep 1502 (Sir Robert also held the baronies of Menzies and Camsorny). On 1 May 1533, King James V granted Alexander Menzies, (1504-1563), son and heir apparent of Sir Robert, the lands and barony of Rannoch (terras et baroniam de Rannoch, viz. Downane, Kinclauchir, duas Cammyserachtis, Ardlaroche, Kilquhonane, Lairane, Ardlair, Laragan), the island of Loch Rannoch (insulam de Lochranoche), the lakes of Rannoch and Ericht (cum lacubus de Rannoche et Irochty) and all the lochs and islands.

== Barons of Rannoch (1502) ==
Barons of Rannoch (born and died where known/relevant)^{a}	Succeeded
Sir Robert Menzies of that Ilk (1475-1557)	1502
Alexander Menzies (1504-1563)	1533
James Menzies of that Ilk, 14th baron of Menzies (1523-1585)	1563
Sir Alexander Menzies of that Ilk, 15th baron of Menzies (1566-1644)	1585
Sir Duncan Menzies of that Ilk, 16th baron of Menzies (1600-1656)	1644
Sir Alexander Menzies of that Ilk, 17th baron of Menzies, 1st baronet of Menzies, Nova Scotia (1623-1695)	1656
Sir Alexander Menzies, 2nd baronet of Menzies, Nova Scotia (died c. 1730)	1695
Sir Robert Menzies, 21st baron of that Ilk, 3rd baronet of Menzies, Nova Scotia (1706-1786)	1778
Sir John Menzies of that Ilk, 4th baronet of Menzies, Nova Scotia ( - 26 Mar 1800)	1786
Sir Robert Menzies, 5th baronet of Menzies, 22nd baron of that Ilk (1745-3 May 1813)	1800
Sir Neil Menzies, 6th baronet of Menzies, Nova Scotia, 23rd baron of that Ilk (1780-16 Aug 1844)	1813
Sir Robert Menzies, 24th baron of Menzies 7th baronet of Menzies, Nova Scotia (26 Sep 1817-22 Apr 1903)	1844
Sir Neil James Menzies of that Ilk, 8th baronet of Menzies, Nova Scotia, 25th baron of Menzies (1855 – 21 December 1910)^{b}	13 Jun 1903
Dame Susan Harriet Grant Suttie or Menzies ( - 1946)	20 Mar 1911
Trustees of Dame Susan above	8 March 1913
John Dupuis Cobbold	11 Nov 1914
Rannoch Estate Ltd (controlled by John Dupuis Cobbold above)	27 Aug 1924

a: The Campbells of Glenorchy had some claim to the lands of Rannoch in the 17th century: on 25 July 1661, John Campbell the younger of Glen Orchy sold to John Campbell of Ferdew the lands and barony of Rannoch. Nevertheless, on 1 Mar 1679 James Menzies of Culdares, had a sasine of the lands and barony of Rannoch

b: having no surviving sons, the Nova Scotia baronetcy of Menzies expired
