= Era Ten =

Science fiction role-playing game

Cover art by Todd Pickens

Era Ten, subtitled "Sci Fi Role-Play", is a science fiction role-playing game (RPG) published by Better Games in 1990.

== Contents ==
Era Ten is a science fiction role-playing game set a thousand years in the future, when humanity ("Terrans") have formed the "Tetra League", an alliance with three alien species (the Cruz, the Skia and the Cimmer.) A "pacification" virus has left most citizens of the League unable to engage in conflict. Those that are immune become either violent criminals preying on the pacified masses, or are pressed into service as armor-clad assault troops that fight the criminals or defend worlds against alien invasion.

The game comes with three books:

- "Battle Born": 38 pages of role-playing rules.
- "Encounters and Sci-Fi Scenarios": A 53-page book of "Quick & Dirty" tables used to generate random encounters using playing cards as a randomizer.
- "Designing Sci-Fi Scenarios" A 38-page book of more tables that are used to create missions and scenarios.

The game also comes with a paper gamemaster's screen that proved to be too flimsy to stand on its own.

There are no lists of equipment that each player character can buy. The emphasis in the rules is on storytelling rather than dice rolling, which is only used for skill and task resolution.

=== Character generation ===
Characters can be any one of the four races of the Tetra League, each of which possess certain advantages. Players then choose a career path for the character (grunt, doc, tech-ninja, spec, or sarge), which determines the superior attributes and skills the character has. Additional skills can be purchased using a point-buy system.

=== Advancement ===
The gamemaster can choose one of two options for advancement: Advancement upon mission completion; or the characters must complete nine story elements such as heroics, a cunning ploy, personal growth, etc. in order to advance.

=== Gameplay ===
The "Quick & Dirty" tables are used for every aspect of the game, including personal combat, task resolution, and spacefleet engagements.

== Publication history ==
In the early 1980s, the RPG game market was dominated by games with complex rules such as Dungeons & Dragons (TSR) and RuneQuest (Chaosium). But in the late 1980s, small independent game designers started to create games that were less about rolling dice and more centered on the story narrative. Two such designers were Joseph Hillmer and George Rahm, who created two "rules light" role-playing games: the science fiction RPG Era Ten and the fantasy RPG Barony. Both implemented a much simplified rules system that used tables and a deck of cards to resolve all action in the game. Era Ten, featuring the artwork of Todd Pickens, was published by Better Games of Burbank, California in 1990. Better Games also produced several supplements for Era Ten, which were published on their website and in the pages of Space Gamer/Fantasy Gamer.

== Reception ==
In Issue 26 of White Wolf #26 (April/May, 1991), Stewart Wieck reviewed both of Better Games' RPGs, Barony and Era Ten, and liked the rules system, calling it "an outline that relies little on actual rules, and more on gamemaster initiative." But Wieck was not impressed by the poor editing, noting "the choppy writing (innumerable sentence fragments) makes the text tiresome to follow." Wieck was also distressed by the lack of organization of the rules. Nonetheless, Wieck concluded by giving Era Ten a rating of 4 out of 5, saying, "Better Games works under the tagline that you've been gamemastering long enough to know what you want and how you want to run your game. The systems presented in Barony and Era Ten will allow you to do this if you have the stamina to survive the rules writing and the wits to use the ideas."

In Issue 48 of Challenge (Jan.-Feb. 1991), Lester W. Smith liked the storytelling aspect of the game, but found, "The game has one major problem. That is, the writing is terrible. The books consist largely of poorly expressed, ungrammatical sentences, collected into paragraphs that ramble relatively aimlessly from topic to topic ... absolutely the worst written of any of the roleplaying games I've ever read." Despite this, Smith concluded, "Era Ten is a lot of fun. The problems with its text mechanics is offset by its inventiveness."

In his 2014 book Designers & Dragons: The '80s, game historian Shannon Appelcline noted that Era Ten and Barony were part of a movement of "'free style roleplay' games" in the early 1990s, "early 'indie' efforts that tried to break free of the old clichés of RPGs and instead offer more story-oriented games."
