= Baron of Ardgrain =

Scottish noble title

Baron of Ardgrain is a noble title within the Baronage of Scotland, historically tied to the Ardgrain Estate, located near Ellon, Aberdeenshire.

== History ==
The Barony of Ardgrain is historically tied to Nether Ardgrain, located near Ellon, Aberdeenshire. The estate dates back to the 16th century, with the Nether Ardgrain farmhouse built in 1664 by John Kennedy of Kermuck. The property is recognised as a Category A listed building, reflecting its architectural and historical importance.

== Current titleholder ==
Pepijn Oscar Hendriks, Baron of Ardgrain since 2013.

== See also ==
- Baronage of Scotland
- Ellon, Aberdeenshire
- Historic Environment Scotland
