= Baron of Bannockburn =

Barony in the Baronage of Scotland

Baron of Bannockburn is a title of nobility in the Baronage of Scotland located in the historical county of Stirlingshire.

The first barons of Bannockburn were from the Sandilands and Vere families, descendants of a man named James who around 1348 had been granted the territory of Sandilands, Lesmahagow Lanarkshire, taking the territorial name as his surname. He was also later granted the barony of Calder near Edinburgh. The link of the Sandilands to Bannockburn was established on 14 July 1489, when King James IV confirmed James Sandelands of Calder and his wife Margaret Kerr his wife in the lands of Bannockburn.

By 7 July 1509, James Calder had transferred Bannockburn to his son. On that date, King James IV confirmed a charter by Sir James Sandelands of Calder granting various lands including the barony of Ouchterbannok alias Bannockburn to his son James Sandelands. On 23 August 1510, King James IV granted Sir James Sandelands of Caldour (nephew of Sir James Sandelands and his wife Mariota Forrester), various lands including the lands and barony of Bannockburn.

Robert De Vere, 6th Earl of Oxford accompanied Edward II. on his campaign which culminated in defeat by the victorious King Robert the Bruce at the Battle of Bannockburn on the 23rd and 24 June 1314.

It is by a quirk of fate that the barony of Bannockburn was granted to the Sandilands as they were close relatives to the senior Scottish branch of the Veres both in blood and territorial location their estates in Lanarkshire being contiguous.

The Veres of Lesmahagow and Calder whose vast estates in Lanarkshire in the early 14th century encompassed that of their near relatives and neighbours the Sandilands are today represented by their descendants the Hope Vere Anderson family of Lesmahagow, Lanarkshire and New Abbey, Dumfries and Galloway.

Hope Vere Anderson acquired the title in 2016.
