= Baron of Lethington =

Title of nobility in the Baronage of Scotland

Barony of Lethington
- Coat of Arms of the Baron of Lethington as granted by the Lord Lyon of Scotland
- Creation date: c. 1155
- Creation: Baronage of Scotland
- Arms: Azure, a cross engrailed Argent between four roses Or barbed and seeded.

Baron of Lethington is a heritable title of nobility in the Baronage of Scotland.

== History ==
In 1166, King William the Lion of Scotland issued a writ confirming the grant of his predecessor King Malcolm IV of Scotland:

Willemus . Rex Scottorum . Omnibus probis . homnibus tocius terre sue . Clericus . laicis . Francis . Anglis . Scottis . et Galweiensbus salutem . Sciant presentes et futuri . me concessisse . et hac carta mea confirmasse hugoni Giffard . et heredibus suis . in fewdo et hereditate . omnes terras et teneuras quas idem hugo habet ex donacione Regis Macolmi . fratris mei . et Ade Comitesse . matris mee . et Herberti Camerarij . scilicet Jhestrith per Rectas diuisas suas . et illam partem de laftidune . quam Edolf filius Ginel tenuit . et terram more hadingtun per diusas per quas perambulata . et unum plenarium toftum in linlidqu . scilicet toftum quod toke tenuit . Et Berewaldestune per Rectas diuisas suas quam herbertus Camerarius cum filia sua ei dedit . Et quatuor libratas terre in pottum sicut Walterus de lindesi . te Engelramus clericus ilias ei perambulauerunt . et Aldekathin per rectas diusas suas . Volo itaque et prcipio . ut idem hugo et heredes sui terras . et teneuras prenominatas hereditarie trneant et habeant . ita libere . et quiete et honorifice . sicut Carte Regis . Malcolmi . fratris mei . et Ade Comitisse matris mee et . Herberti . Camerarij . testantur . et confirmant . Testibus Nicolao Cancellario . Richardo de Morevilla constabulario Dauid Olifar . Willelmo de ueteri ponte . Bernardo filio brien Gilberto filio Richerij. Roberto de Costentin . Apud Dunelmum.

=== Original grant ===
Circa 1155, upon the marriage of Hugh de Giffard to the daughter of Herbert the Lord High Chamberlain of Scotland, King Malcolm IV of Scotland, his widowed mother Countess Ada de Warenne, and Herbert granted a royal charter for lands in Lethington (Laftidune), Haddinton (Hadingtun), and other parts of what is now East Lothian, which comprised the erection of the Barony of Yester.

=== Additional lands incorporated ===
Circa 1166–1182, King William granted two subsequent royal charters, which added lands to the barony. Subsequent to Hugh’s death and the barony passing to his son William, King William also confirmed in a royal charter to William several lands, including the whole of Lethington. Additional lands were added to the barony via successive royal charters over the ensuing decades.

=== Relationship with the Crown ===
Since the reign of King David I of Scotland, the de Giffard family had an exceptionally close relationship with Scotland’s royal family. Prior to the erection of this barony, Hugh de Giffard regularly accompanied King David and King Malcolm on their travels (called perambulations) and witnessed their granting of royal charters of baronies. This relationship continued with Hugh’s son William de Giffard, who would be a guarantor of a treaty between Scotland and England.. King William’s son Alexander, who would become King Alexander II of Scotland, was born on lands of this barony. Hugh’s grandson (William de Giffard’s son), also named Hugh de Giffard, was appointed Guardian of the young King Alexander III of Scotland and was conferred as one of the Council of Regents of Scotland until Alexander’s majority.

=== Yester Castle ===
The barony’s historical seat (or caput) was Yester Castle, which was built by Hugh de Giffard (grandson of the first baron) prior to 1267.

=== The Maitlands ===
The ancient Maitland family had come across from France to England with William the Conqueror and settled in Northumberland. They won favour with King William I of Scotland and had been important landowners in southern Scotland since around 1250. At a point prior to 1345, Robert Maitland of Thirlestane married a daughter of Hugh de Giffard III (thus, the great-great-granddaughter of the first baron) and was granted the barony, with its lands and Yester Castle. In the late 1300s to early 1400s time frame, Lethington Tower (later Lethington Castle) was built and became the barony's seat (or caput). Yester Castle was vacated. Under the Maitlands, the title was ultimately confirmed as the Baron of Lethington.
