= Baron of Abbotshall =

Scottish noble title

- Creation date: 16th century
- Creation: Baronage of Scotland
- Created by: King James VI of Scotland
- First holder: Sir Thomas Scott of Abbotshall
- Remainder to: heirs and assignees
- Status: extant
- Former seat: Abbotshall House

Baron of Abbotshall is a title of nobility in the Baronage of Scotland associated with the lands of Abbotshall, near Kirkcaldy in Fife, Scotland. The title has historical connections to the Scott family.

== History ==
The Barony of Abbotshall dates back to the 16th century, when it was held by the Scott family, who were significant landowners in Fife. Thomas Scott of Abbotshall, the first known baron, established the family's presence in the region, and the title remained with his descendants for several generations. The barony's lands were historically connected with nearby Kirkcaldy, playing a role in the local economy and governance.

The barony has changed hands multiple times over the centuries. The original Abbotshall House, once the seat of the barony, was replaced by a mansion in the 17th century, which itself fell into ruin by the 1800s. Today, remnants of the original estate, including some old walls and gateways, can still be found in Raith Gardens, Kirkcaldy.

== Notable barons ==
- Sir Thomas Scott of Abbotshall: The first known holder of the barony, established the Scott family's influence in Fife. He was the son of Thomas Scott of Abbotshall (and Agnes Moncreiffe) who received the lands by disposition (a legal transfer of property) in the 16th century, the lands were later raised to a barony for his son by royal charter signed by King James VI of Scotland. (Note: Baronial titles tend to be used when a landed family holds no peerage title of higher rank, subsequently granted, nor has been created a knight of the realm. While some families prefer to be known as [name] of [barony] if they own the caput. In this case the holder was a Baronet (hereditary knight) which outranks his baronial title.)
