= Baron of Blackhall =

Scottish noble title

Royal Barony of Blackhall
- Creation date: 1395
- Creation: Baronage of Scotland
- Created by: David II
- First holder: Sir John Stewart, 1st Baron of Blackhall
- Remainder to: heirs male of the body lawfully begotten
- Status: extant
- Seat: Blackhall Manor
- Motto: "Oh Pilgrim Heart Forget Not The Cat"

Baron of Blackhall is a title of nobility in the Baronage of Scotland associated with the ancient lands of Blackhall, located in the parish of Paisley, Renfrewshire, Scotland. The title

== Robert Brown Gillespie, 27th Baron of Blackhall, O.B.E. ==
The current holder of the title is Robert Brown Gillespie, 27th Baron of Blackhall.

== Modern transition of baronage titles ==
The status of the barony changed significantly after the Scotland Act 2000, which redefined baronies as incorporeal heritable titles, no longer tied to land ownership.

== Notable barons ==
- Sir John Stewart, 1st Baron of Blackhall: The first known holder of the title, granted in the 14th century.

== Arms ==
The coat of arms associated with the Baron of Blackhall is described as: "Argent a fess Gules between in chief a stag's head cabossed and in base a fleur-de-lis Sable." The stag's head represents strength and vigilance, while the fleur-de-lis is a symbol of purity and light. The family motto is "Oh Pilgrim Heart Forget Not The Cat," reflecting a long-standing dedication to serving the nation.
