= Baron of Plenderleith =

Title of nobility in the Baronage of Scotland

Barony of Plenderleith
- Creation date: 1306
- Creation: Baronage of Scotland
- Created by: Robert the Bruce
- First holder: Sir William Wishart, 1st Baron of Plenderleith
- Present holder: Clifford Harmon, 31st Baron of Plenderleith
- Heir apparent: Clifford Taylor Harmon IV, Younger of Plenderleith
- Remainder to: heirs and assignees
- Status: extant

Baron of Plenderleith is an ancient title of nobility in the Baronage of Scotland.

The Barony of Plenderleith is a crown barony comprising approximately one half of Oxnam Parish, Roxburghshire, in the vicinity of Kelso, Scottish Borders. The earliest references to the estates of Plenderleith (also known as Plenderlathe, Prendrelathe, Prendrelath, Pendirlath, and Prendirlath) date to 1175, when John de Plenderleith witnessed a charter in lands in Teviotdale during the reign of William the Lion. By the mid-13th century, the lands of Plenderleith were held by Nicholas de Prendrelathe, lay abbott of Jedburgh Abbey. In 1292, the estates passed to his daughter, Johanna, the wife of Sir John Wishart (Wishard/Wischarde/Whyssard/Wyssard).

Sir John was sent by Robert the Bruce and John Comyn, then Guardians of Scotland, in embassy to France in 1302. Upon the Bruce's accession to the throne of Scotland in 1306 as Robert I, he erected the lands of Plenderleith, then held by Sir John's son, William, into a barony, apparently in recognition of this service. When Sir William died, the lands and barony of Plenderleith passed to his daughter, Alicia. She subsequently married Sir George de Abernethy, 4th Baron of Saltoun, who, through the marriage, became Baron of Plenderleith, as well.

In 1346, Edward Balliol, who had usurped the title "King of Scots" with the support of Edward III of England, declared Plenderleith forfeit to the crown as a result of Sir George's support for the Scottish king David II's invasion of England. Sir George had accompanied King David into England, and was captured with the king at the Battle of Neville's Cross. During Sir George's internment in the Tower of London, control of Plenderleith was awarded by Balliol to Sir Walter de Selby. After Sir Walter's death at Lydelle, Edward III proclaimed Sir Walter's son, James de Selby, as heir to his father's rights and titles in Plenderleith. Some time following David II's uncontested return to the Scottish throne in 1357, the barony was restored to Sir George, though as late as 1359, it was reported by Henry Ker, Sheriff of Roxburgh, that the "barony was in the allegiance of England."

The barony remained in the hands of the Abernethys of Saltoun until 1612, when John, 8th Lord Saltoun, conveyed several of his estates, including the lands and barony of Plenderleith, to Sir James Stewart of Killeith, 4th Lord Ochiltree, in order to satisfy debts. Lord Ochiltree, in turn, assigned Plenderleith to John Gordon of Cairnburrow (Lord Rothiemay) in 1617, who passed the barony to Robert Ker, 1st Earl of Roxburghe in 1620. These assignations were confirmed by James VI. In 1707, John Ker, 5th Earl of Roxburghe, was created 1st Duke of Roxburghe for his services in bringing about the Act of Union of 1707. In 1755, his successor, John Ker, 3rd Duke and Earl of Roxburghe, received a Crown Charter from George II confirming to him the barony of Plenderleith. After Plenderleith had been held by the Earls and Dukes of Roxburghe for over 300 years, the rights and title of Baron of Plenderleith passed by assignation from the Innes-Kers to the Harmons. The current and 31st Baron of Plenderleith is Clifford Harmon of Dallas, Texas, who succeeded to the barony in 2007 following the death of his father. The heir apparent to the barony is Clifford Taylor Harmon IV.

In addition to the 1306 charter erecting the barony, Crown Charters confirming the barony were issued by James II in 1464, Edward IV in 1483, James VI in 1613 and 1620, Charles I in 1635, and George II in 1755. The 1483 charter united the barony of Plenderleith to the barony of Abernethy, though it remained independently recognised in subsequent heirship proceedings and was later formally separated again.

== Arms ==
Coat of arms of Baron of Plenderleith

Crest
The crest sits atop a helm appropriate to the Dignity of a Baron in the Baronage of Scotland

== Sources and further reading ==
- Calendar of the Laing Charters
- Senior-Milne, Graham (41st Baron of Mordington), The Feudal Baronies of Scotland (2005)http://www.peerage.org/genealogy/Baronies.htm
- Grant, Alexander, Franchises North of the Border: Baronies and Regalties in Medieval Scotland http://eprints.lancs.ac.uk/633/1/Grant_Franchises.pdf See footnote 55
- Wishart, David, Genealogical History of the Wisharts of Pittarrow and Logie Wishart (Perth, by Wood & Son, 1914) http://www.wishart.org/books
- Fraser, Alexander (17th Lord Saltoun), The Frasers of Philorth, Vol. II (Edinburgh - MDCCCLXXIX), pages 51–52 https://books.google.com/books?id=FyANAAAAYAAJ&pg=PA51
- History of the Berwickshire Naturalists' Club, 1885 - 1886, pages 97–98 and 123-128 https://books.google.com/books?id=bPoXAAAAYAAJ&pg=PA97
- Inquisitionum ad Capellam Regis Retornatarum Abbreviato
- Liber Sancte Marie de Melros (Edinburgh1837) https://books.google.com/books?id=gCIvAAAAMAAJ&pg=PA677, page 677
- National Archives of Scotland
- http://www.rampantscotland.com/ragman/blragman_p.htm
- Register of the Great Seal of Scotland [Registrum Magni Sigilli Regum Scotorum]
- Robertson's Index of Charters (1797)
- http://www.rothi.co.uk/history.html
- Scottish Archives Network Gazetteer (Unit ID10361539)
- Scottish Barony Register
- Paul, James Balfour, The Scots Peerage (Edinburgh: D. Douglas 1904–14)
- Syllabus of Scottish Cartularies - Kelso; http://www.arts.gla.ac.uk/scottishstudies/charters/Kelso.pdf, Charters 276 and 342
- http://www.visionofbritain.org.uk/relationships.jsp;jsessionid=441DAEA4C4D817F207C0926A109F2518?u_id=10361539&c_id=10107260

== See also ==
- List of places in the Scottish Borders
- List of places in Scotland
