= Migvie Castle =

Location
- Coordinates: 57.1468°N 2.9331°W

Site history
- Built: 13th century

Migvie Castle was a 13th-century castle to the west of Migvie, Aberdeenshire, Scotland. Its remains were listed as a scheduled monument in 2007.

== History ==
The castle occupies an important and commanding position along the old north road leading from Aboyne to Strathdon. First mentioned in a charter in 1268 by Uilleam, Earl of Mar, the castle was the seat of the Lord of Cromar and caput of the barony of Cromar. Migvie was later held by the Rutherfords of Tarland in the 1440s and from 1452 it passed to Alexander Gordon, Earl of Huntly.

Slight traces of the castle's curtain wall are visible above ground.
