= Barony (role-playing game) =

Fantasy role-playing game

Cover art by Todd Pickens

Barony, subtitled "Fantasy Role-Play", is a role-playing game published by Better Games in 1990.

== Description ==
Barony is a fantasy role-playing game outlined in three books:

- 42-page rule book
- 39 page scenario design book
- 52-page encounters book

The game also includes a cut-apart tarot deck printed on three letter-sized pieces of cardstock, and a gamemaster's screen printed on paper, which reviewers noted was too flimsy to stand up on its own.

== Gameplay ==
=== Character generation ===
1. Players choose one of four professions for their character: Footman (soldier), Bumpkin (duelist), Street Urchin (thief) or Student (mage).
2. Players then choose one of six Traits for the character from: Bold, Clever, Energetic, Magical, Methodical, and Rugged. Players also roll an eight-sided die to determine if their character has any other Traits.
3. Rather than choosing an exact weapon, players choose a combat skill from a descriptive list such Hero's Great Weapon, Ranged Power Blow or Foul Blow.
4. There is no list of equipment to choose from—characters are assumed to have the proper equipment for each adventure. If a character needs a particular piece of equipment for a certain situation, the player rolls a skill check to see if the character remembered that piece of equipment.

=== Character advancement ===
Characters gain a new level or stage for each adventure completed successfully, and choose advancement in any one of the four beginning professions. If a player chooses to advance the character along the same profession path, the character can reach the highest possible level after as few as eight adventures. Moving a character from profession to profession will slow the rate of advancement down.

=== Skill resolution ===
Skills have four categories: Gifted; Learned; Practiced and Patient; and Physical and Combat. For a character to complete a task, the referee assigns a Difficulty to the task (Simple, Difficult, or Tasking), and the player rolls two eight-sided dice to determine success.

=== Combat ===
There are no exact weapons in this game, only the character's combat skill. There are no hit points — both characters and their opponents have a list of adjectives describing their health, divided into four columns corresponding to the severity of the wound received (Bruise/Cut; Bleeder; Vicious; and Spirit). The tougher the character or opponent, the more adjectives are contained in each list. Each time a creature takes damage, one of the adjectives is marked off. When the last adjective has been removed, the creature is dead. There is also a completely separate combat system for battling dragons.

=== Magic ===
Rather than casting a pre-printed spell, the player simply tells the referee what effect is desired, and which of six "laws of nature" is being broken. The referee judges if the request is reasonable, and decides to what degree the laws of nature are being broken. The player then makes a skill roll for each law being broken, the difficulty being dependent on the degree to which the law is being broken. If the player is not very successful, the character will either have to pay a cost in Magic Points, or if the character has no Magic Points, the player rolls dice to determine a Major Mishap that will inflict the character.

== Publication history ==
In the early 1980s, the RPG game market was dominated by games with complex rules such as Dungeons & Dragons (TSR) and RuneQuest (Chaosium). But in the late 1980s, small independent game designers started to create games that were less about rolling dice and more centered on the story narrative. Two such designers were Joseph Hillmer and George Rahm, who created two "rules light" role-playing games: the science fiction RPG Era Ten and the fantasy RPG Barony. Both implemented a much simplified rules system that used tables and a deck of cards to resolve all action in the game. Barony, featuring the artwork of Todd Pickens, was published by Better Games of Burbank, California in 1990. Better Games also produced several supplements for Barony, which were published on their website and in the pages of Space Gamer/Fantasy Gamer.

== Reception ==
Stewart Wieck, reviewing both of Better Games' RPGs, Barony and Era Ten, in White Wolf #26 (April/May, 1991), liked the rules system, calling it "an outline that relies little on actual rules, and more on gamemaster initiative." But Wieck was not impressed by the poor editing, noting "the choppy writing (innumerable sentence fragments) makes the text tiresome to follow." Wieck was also distressed by the lack of organization of the rules. Nonetheless, Wieck concluded by giving Barony a rating of 4 out of 5, saying, "Better Games works under the tagline that you've been gamemastering long enough to know what you want and how you want to run your game. The systems presented in Barony and Era Ten will allow you to do this if you have the stamina to survive the rules writing and the wits to use the ideas."

In the March 1992 edition of Dragon (Issue #179), Lester Smith Smith found the game "amazing in its inventiveness." He liked the outward appearance of the packaged game but found the titles of the three books too ambiguous, with lack of clarity as to which one he should read first. Smith found a certain "lack of polish" in the product, with small, dense text with no chapter headings, and a writing style that "ranges from mildly difficult to nigh impossible to read in places, and evinces a near complete lack of awareness of the simplest technical writing tricks to make text easy to comprehend. The thing that bothers me most about this is that the creative ideas included in the game deserve better presentation." Despite these problems, Smith believed that "The Barony game should be part of every serious role-player’s library. The magic system, dragon battle system, mission generator, and encounter generator can be adapted very easily to any other fantasy role-playing game, and that FRPG will be the richer for it ... Despite my complaints about the game’s presentation, I highly recommend the Barony game.

In his 2014 book Designers & Dragons: The '80s, game historian Shannon Appelcline noted that Barony and Era Ten were part of a movement of "'free style roleplay' games" in the early 1990s, "early 'indie' efforts that tried to break free of the old clichés of RPGs and instead offer more story-oriented games."
