= Lord of Parliament =

Lowest rank of Scottish nobility

Coronet worn by Lords of Parliament.

Lord of Parliament (Scots: Laird o Pairlament) is the lowest rank within the Peerage of Scotland. It is distinct from barons, who were historically feudal barons until the abolition of the feudal system in 2004. The Abolition of Feudal Tenure etc. (Scotland) Act 2000 converted feudal baronial titles into non-territorial dignities, preserving the dignity of baron and other titles, whether of feudal or personal origin, along with their associated quality, precedence, and heraldic rights. Unlike barons, who hold a noble but non-peerage rank within the Baronage of Scotland (comparable to barons in some continental European systems), lords of Parliament hold a peerage rank, below a viscount.

Lords of Parliament hold a lordship of Parliament, which allowed them the right to sit and vote in the pre-Union Parliament of Scotland. The creation of new lordships of Parliament ceased with the Acts of Union 1707, which merged the Scottish and English parliaments into the Parliament of Great Britain. From 1707 to 1963, Scottish peers, including lords of parliament, were represented in the House of Lords by a limited number of elected Scottish representative peers. The Peerage Act 1963 allowed all Scottish peers, including lords of Parliament, to sit in the House of Lords without election until the passage of the House of Lords Act 1999.

The 1999 act removed the automatic right of hereditary peers, including lords of Parliament, to sit in the House of Lords. However, a small number of hereditary peers were elected to remain, including two lords of Parliament: Lord Reay and Lady Saltoun. Following Lord Reay's death on 10 May 2013, Lady Saltoun remained the sole lord of Parliament in the chamber until her resignation in December 2014. After that, Lord Fairfax of Cameron also had entered the House of Lords.

The Scotland Act 1998 permits peers of the United Kingdom, Great Britain, England, Scotland, or Ireland to stand for election to the Scottish Parliament, but there is no specific provision for lords of Parliament to be represented in the modern devolved Parliament.

== Styles and forms of address ==
A male holder of a Scottish lordship of Parliament is designated as a Lord of Parliament and is styled Lord [Title]. Female holders of such peerages are styled Lady [Title]; however, there is no distinct formal designation equivalent to "Lord of Parliament" for female peers.

The wife of a lord of Parliament is customarily styled Lady [Title]. Children of lords of parliament, as well as those of female peers holding a lordship of Parliament in their own right, are granted the courtesy style The Honourable [Forename] [Surname]. The heir apparent to a lordship of Parliament is styled The Master of [Title]. In cases where succession by females is permitted, the heiress presumptive may be styled The Mistress of [Title]. These courtesy titles may continue to be used after the death of the peer parent.

The term Lord of Parliament (or Lady of Parliament) may also be used in a broader sense to refer to any member of the House of Lords, regardless of peerage. This usage appears in official contexts; for example, a Standing Order of the House of Lords states that bishops who receive writs of summons are not peers, but are "Lords of Parliament" for the purpose of participating in its proceedings.

== See also ==
- Laird
- List of Lordships of Parliament
