= Lords of Regality =

Baronial titles of nobility in Scotland

In the Baronage of Scotland, a Lord of Regality is an ancient noble title. Lords of regality were said to hold a regality - a type of territorial jurisdiction under old Scots law. This jurisdiction was created by erecting lands in liberam regalitatem (in free regality), and the area over which this right extended became the regality.

== Background ==
Regality jurisdictions originated as a form of delegated authority from the Scottish monarch. Lords of regality historically had powers akin to an earl palatine in England, and they held superior courts, known as regality courts, that exercised both civil and criminal legal powers over specified lands and baronies.

In terms of civil jurisdiction, regality courts possessed authority equivalent to that of the monarch's regional sheriff courts. They also held extensive criminal judicial powers, known as "pits and gallows", which were comparable to those of the High Court of Justiciary, Scotland's supreme criminal court, except in cases of treason. A regality court's jurisdiction superseded that of any lower baron courts encompassed within its boundaries, regardless of the baronies' ownership status.

Regality courts were traditionally presided over by the lord of regality's bailie or their deputy. The courts also included suitors of court - individuals who held lands within the regality by obligation of suit of court, or attendance at the regality court.

Where appropriate for coastal properties, lords of regality could also hold rights of admiralty. Article 19 of the Act of Union 1707 protected these admiralty and vice-admiralty rights in Scotland, treating them as heritable rights of property, while subject to regulations and changes by the Parliament regarding their exercise. Therefore, lords of regality with coastal lands would also have been lords admiral of the realm, as the office of Lord Admiral survived the Heritable Jurisdictions (Scotland) Act 1746 in the same way the title of hereditary sheriff, as recognised by the Lord Lyon, and lord of regality survived. Senior Counsel asserts the Act should be interpreted based on its purpose, which was to remove jurisdictions, not titles.

While initially established to aid in governance through delegated authority, some regality lords in the 14th century attempted to usurp royal power and rule their jurisdictions independently. By the 15th century, regalities had returned to functioning as a means of local administration on behalf of the monarchy.

The 1746 Act formally abolished all regality jurisdictions and limited lords of regality's rights to those of a burgh of barony. However, the titles remain in descriptive use today, particularly regarding grants of arms by the Lord Lyon King of Arms, the heraldic authority in Scotland, who will accept ownership of a dignity of regality as sufficient to bring the holder within his jurisdiction for seeking an arms, as Lyon considers a regality to be a genus of barony.

== List of Lordships of Regality ==
Title	C.
Lord of Regality of Arbroath	1605
Lord of Regality of Coupar (Angus)	1606
Lord of Regality of the Garioch	
Lord of Regality of Holyroodhouse
Lord of Regality of Kirkstyle	17c
Lord of Regality of Mordington	1381
Lord of Regality of Pittenweem	1605
Lord of Regality of Slains	1452

== See also ==
- Burgh of regality

== Sources ==
- Walker, David M. (1980). The Oxford Companion to Law.
