= Hereditament =

In common law, a hereditament (from Latin hereditare, to inherit, from heres, heir) is any kind of property that can be inherited. Hereditaments are divided into corporeal and incorporeal.

Corporeal hereditaments are "such as affect the senses, and may be seen and handled by the body; incorporeal are not the subject of sensation, can neither be seen nor handled, are creatures of the mind, and exist only in contemplation". An example of a corporeal hereditament is land held in freehold and in leasehold.

Incorporeal hereditaments include hereditary titles of honour or dignity, heritable titles of office, coats of arms, prescriptive baronies, pensions, annuities, rentcharges, franchises, and any other like interest having no physical existence. Two categories related to the church have been abolished in England and Wales and certain other parts of the British Isles: tithes and advowsons.

The term featured in the one-time "sweeper definition" (ie, the catch-all phrase) "lands, tenements and hereditaments", although this is deprecated in contemporary legal documents. The terms "land", "buildings" and (where such land is unregistered) "appurtenant rights", invariably coupled with itemised lists of fixtures and decorations and the like, more properly describe property constituting or connected with land — as opposed to goods, chattels and other forms of movable property.

== Other meanings ==
In the UK, the word is used in annual property taxation; its practical definition being the answer to the question, "as a matter of fact and degree, is or will the building, as a building, be ready for occupation, or capable of occupation, for the purposes for which it is intended?" combined with tests surrounding whether it is a dwelling and case law decisions, for example whether:

- other structures than homes such as garages form part of the hereditament
- the addition or reduction of small parcels of land constitutes a new "hereditament".
