= Baronage of Scotland =

Heritable title of honour in Scotland

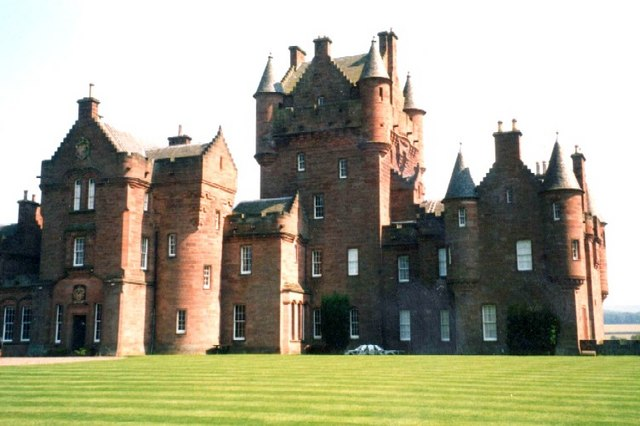
Ayton Castle, Scottish Borders, caput of the barony of Ayton. Built in 1851 in the Scottish Baronial style by William Mitchell-Innes, then baron of Ayton, to the design of James Gillespie Graham

In Scotland, a "baron" or "baroness" holds a barony within the Baronage of Scotland, recognised as titled nobility. The holder of a barony having the status of a minor baron. Scottish baronies are heritable titles of honour, originally created by Crown charter from the medieval period onward. They are distinct from the Peerage of Scotland; a Scottish baron is noble but not a peer, and the Scottish equivalent of an English baron is the higher title of Lord of Parliament. Scottish baronies differ from British peerage and baronetage titles in that they may be succeeded by alienation, not solely by inheritance. Unlike these titles, they are not governed by strict succession rules and have remainders to "heirs and assignees", as stated in Crown charters. These titles are also excluded from the Honours (Prevention of Abuses) Act 1925, since they are not newly created honours but existing dignities recognised in law.

Historically, a barony combined a defined estate with land with local jurisdictional power; barons administered justice through baron's courts, and sat in the Parliament of Scotland. Their powers were curtailed in the 18th century, and Scottish baronies survived into modern times principally as titles of honour attached to land. Although being historically referred to as feudal barons, the term feudal is now incorrect. The Abolition of Feudal Tenure etc. (Scotland) Act 2000, which came into force in 2004, severed baronies from the land to which they had been attached. They became non-territorial dignities, or personal honours in law, with no associated land rights. The heraldic privileges associated with a barony are regulated by the Court of the Lord Lyon, although the Lord Lyon King of Arms has no jurisdiction over the assignation of the title itself.

== History ==
Scottish baronies originated as grants of land by the Crown, which gave the holder both an estate and the jurisdiction to administer justice within it. They were heritable and, in time, prescriptive: a barony attached to the land rather than to the person, and could be alienated together with the principal seat of the barony (called the caput), rather than passing solely by inheritance. Most Scottish baronies were created before 1745, although a small number were erected as late as 1824.

A barony required a Crown charter erecting specified lands into a barony, recorded in the Register of the Great Seal of Scotland. Where the original charter was later lost, an official extract from the Register carried the same legal weight. The General Register of Sasines, established in 1617, provided a public record of land transfers and conferred prescriptive rights over the caput. From 1874, the requirement that each new baron be confirmed by the Crown through a charter of confirmation was abolished, and transfers were thereafter recorded by ordinary disposition in the Register of Sasines.

Barons sat in the Parliament of Scotland as part of the Second Estate. In 1428, James I sought to allow the smaller barons to be represented by elected shire commissioners, but this did not become a regular occurrence until 1587. Greater barons frequently acquired peerage titles over time, becoming lords of parliament, earls, or dukes; lesser barons retained local influence through their baron's courts. In the aftermath of the Jacobite rising of 1745, the jurisdiction of these courts was restricted to minor civil and criminal matters by the Heritable Jurisdictions (Scotland) Act 1746.

Following the Acts of Union of 1707, legislative authority over Scottish private law passed to the Parliament of Great Britain at Westminster and, from 1999, to the devolved Scottish Parliament. The Scottish Parliament's first major reform of land law was the Abolition of Feudal Tenure etc. (Scotland) Act 2000, which came into force on 28 November 2004. The Act abolished the feudal system of land tenure in Scotland and severed baronies from the land to which they had been attached. Existing baronies were preserved as dignities – incorporeal hereditaments, similar to hereditary peerages, baronetcies, and coats of arms – but no longer conferred any right to land. The Act meant a barony could no longer be acquired by purchasing land containing the caput.

Since 2000, baronies are thus "floating" dignities, capable of being assigned by their holder or bequeathed by will. Where a baron dies intestate, the dignity is inherited under the pre-1964 rules of succession, which the Succession (Scotland) Act 1964 preserved for titles and dignities. The Court of the Lord Lyon retains jurisdiction over the heraldic aspects of baronies, and a holder may petition it for a grant of arms. The Court has no jurisdiction over the legal assignation of baronies, which is a matter of civil law.

=== Lordships ===
The medieval baronage existed alongside, and overlapped with, a category of greater territorial dignities known as the "provincial lordships". These were extensive territories such as the lordships of Annandale, Badenoch, Galloway, Lorne, and the Lordship of the Isles, which corresponded to whole provinces and resembled earldoms in scale rather than the ordinary barony. Over the 14th and 15th centuries these provincial lordships largely ceased to exist as a distinct category: most were absorbed into earldoms, came into the hands of the Crown, or became lordships of parliament, that is, peerages. By the middle of the 15th century the higher dignities of duke, earl, and lord of parliament had developed into a personal, honorific peerage, distinct from the baronage out of which the greater barons had been drawn.

Within the Baronage of Scotland, the holder of a lordship may be styled either "Lord of X" or "Baron of X". By contrast, the holder of an ordinary barony, one not erected into a lordship, is styled only "Baron of X". Nevertheless, the institutional writer Lord Stair described such lordships within the baronage as "but more noble titles of a barony" in 1681.

== Acquisition and transfer since 2004 ==
The Abolition of Feudal Tenure etc. (Scotland) Act 2000 separated Scottish baronies from the land with which they had previously been associated. As a result, baronial titles became freely transferable and may be bought, sold, gifted, or bequeathed independently of any landholding, with the transferee becoming the new holder of the title. Baronies may be acquired by any individual regardless of nationality or place of residence. The explanatory notes to the Act observed that a market in Scottish baronies had developed in recent years and cited a Scottish Law Commission estimate that, based on 1997 market evidence, a barony of no particular distinction was worth approximately £60,000. In 2002, the Barony of MacDonald of the Isle of Skye was reported to have been offered for sale for more than £1 million. Baronies are not registrable in the Land Register, and deeds relating to them are no longer recordable in the Register of Sasines.

A non-statutory "Scottish Barony Register" was established by members of the Scottish legal profession in 2004 to record transfers. The Scottish Barony Register reached an understanding with the Lord Lyon King of Arms whereby the Custodian of the Register can certify that an individual holds a baronial title, which is considered sufficient evidence for proceedings before the Lyon Court.

== Styles and forms of address ==
Holders of a Scottish barony may incorporate the title into their name in the form "John Doe, Baron of X" or "Jane Doe, Baroness of X". Where the holder is also in possession of the caput, and has permission of the Lord Lyon, the territorial designation may be combined with the title, as in "John Doe of X, Baron of X". The name recorded by the Lord Lyon King of Arms in a grant or matriculation of arms becomes the holder's official name for legal purposes.

The standard third-person forms are "The Baron of X" and "The Baroness of X". The form "Baron X" is incorrect, as it implies a peerage title. Where the husband holds the barony, his wife is granted the courtesy title "Baroness of X" or "Lady X"; the husband of a substantive baroness receives no courtesy title. The eldest son of a baron or baroness may use the territorial designation with the suffix "yr" (younger) if approved by the Lord Lyon. In formal correspondence, the honorific prefix The Much Honoured (abbreviated as The Much Hon.) can be used.

== Heraldry ==
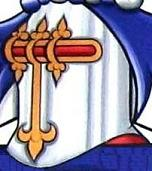
A Scottish baron's helmet

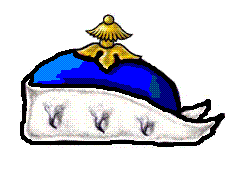
An azure chapeau

The heraldic privileges of Scottish barons are regulated by the Lord Lyon King of Arms, who exercises authority over the granting and matriculation of arms in Scotland. A holder may petition the Lyon Court for a grant of arms and is entitled to bear the helm and additaments appropriate to the dignity. Barons may wear two eagle feathers when dressed in Highland attire; for those belonging to a clan, the practice is subject to consultation with the clan chief. Between the 1930s and 2004, the Lord Lyon also granted a chapeau or cap of maintenance to barons as part of their armorial achievement: gules doubled ermine for barons in possession of the caput, and an azure version for heirs of ancient baronial families no longer holding the estates. The Baron of the Bachuil is uniquely permitted to use a chapeau lined with vair (squirrel fur). The chapeau was an addition introduced under Thomas Innes of Learney as Lord Lyon and is no longer granted; many earlier baronial arms do not include it.

== List of baronies ==
Below is an incomplete list of baronies created in the Scottish baronage. Titles in italics are subsidiary baronial titles held by the same baron. Titles linked and with The before the name is the holder's primary title.

Title	Creation date
The Baron of Abbotshall	17c
The Baron of Abergeldie	1482
The Baron of Aden	1333
The Baron of Alford	17c
The Baron of Alforshire	
Baron of Trent	
The Baron of Anstruther	16c
The Baron of Ardblair	1399
Baron of Gask	
The Baron of Ardgour	16c
The Baron of Ardgowan	13c
The Baron of Ardgrain	
The Baron of Ardoch	16c
The Baron of Arndilly	17c
The Baron of Arnisdale	17c
The Baron of Arnot	1507
The Baron of Auchreoch	15C
The Baron of Auchendarroch	17c
The Baron of Auchenhove	15c
The Baron of Auchindoir	15c
The Baron of Auchinleck	15c
The Baron of Auchmacoy	16c
The Baron of Auchterhouse	13c
The Baron of Auchtermunzie	1437
Baron of Auchterutherstruther	17c
The Baron of Ayton	17c
The Baron of the Bachuil	9c
The Baron of Badenscoth	1823
The Baron of Balcaskie	17c
The Baron of Balfluig	16c
The Baron of Ballencrieff (East Lothian)	
The Baron of Ballencrieff (West Lothian)	15c
The Baron of Ballindalloch	17c
The Baron of Ballumbie	17c
The Baron of Balmachreuchie	15c
Baron of Balmain	1475
The Baron of Balmore	1478
The Baron of Balquhain	1670
Baron of Balquidder	1774
The Baron of Balcaskie	17c
The Baron of Balvaird	16c
The Baron of Balvenie	16c
The Baron of Balvill	1630
The Baron of Banchory	18c
The Baron of Bannockburn	14c
The Baron of Barnbarroch	16c
The Baron of Barnis Forbes	15c
The Baron of Barnton	14c
The Baron of Barr	16c
The Baron of Barra	16c
The Baron of Bathgate	c. 1160
The Baron of Bavelaw	1359
The Baron of Bearcrofts	1697
The Baron of Bedrule	
The Baron of Belton	c. 1468
The Baron of Benholm	15c
The Baron of Biggar	1451
The Baron of Blackburn	16c
The Baron of Blackford	17c
The Baron of Blackhall	1395
The Baron of Blackness	
The Baron of Blair	15c
The Baron of Blantyre	16c
The Baron of Bognie	1635
Baron of Mountblairy	1812
The Baron of Bombie	17c
The Baron of Buittle	1315
The Baron of Brigton	1761
The Baron of Brough	
Baron of Buchan Forest	
Baron of Blairbuis	
Baron of Corsewall	
Baron of Glencammon	
The Baron of Buquhollie and Freswick	16c
The Baron of Byres	1366
Baron of Calder	14c
The Baron of Cambusnethan	1315
The Baron of Carmichael	14c
The Baron of Carnoustie	16c
The Baron of Carnwath	
Baron of Braidwood
Baron of Walston
Baron of Dryden
Baron of Covington
Baron of Milntown
Baron of Westshield
Baron of Newholm
The Baron of Carstairs	14c
Baron of Baldoon	15c
The Baron of Cartsburn	1669
Baron of Castlehill	1411
Baron of Caskieben	16c
The Baron of Castle Stewart	1638
The Baron of Cavers	16c
The Baron of Chirnside	
The Baron of Clackmannan	1334
The Baron of Cleghorn	15c
The Baron of Clerkington	1369
The Baron of Closeburn	15c
The Baron of Clugstoun	1471
The Baron of Cluny	16c
The Baron of Cluny	17c
The Baron of Cockenzie	16c
The Baron of Coigach	1511
The Baron of Coldingknows	1634
The Baron of Elphinstone	15c
The Baron of Colstoun	17c
The Baron of Corrachree	16c
The Baron of Corstorphine	1431
The Baron of Coupar	1606
The Baron of Cowie (Aberdeen)	
The Baron of Cowie (stirling)	12c
Baron of Coxton	1686
The Baron of Craighall	
The Baron of Craigie	1666
Baron of Craigievar	16c
The Baron of Craigmillar	1511
The Baron of Cranshaws	15c
The Baron of Crawfordjohn	13c
The Baron of Crichton	15c
The Baron of Crimond	16c
The Baron of Cromar	
The Baron of Cromarty	17c
The Baron of Crommey	18c
The Baron of Culbin	16c
The Baron of Culcreuch	c. 1472
The Baron of Cushnie	15c
The Baron of Dairsie	18c
The Baron of Dalziel	
The Baron of Danira and Comrie	
The Baron of Delvine	15c
The Baron of Denboig	1657
The Baron of Denny	16c
Baron of Fullarton	
The Baron of Dinnet	14c
Baron of Dirleton	1220
The Baron of Dolphinstoun	c. 1700
The Baron of Dowart	1496
The Baron of Drum	1323
Baron of Drylaw	
Baron of Duart and Morvern	1631
The Baron of Dudhope	1542
The Baron of Dun	1382
Baron of Dunconnel	1400
The Baron of Duncrub	17c
The Baron of Dunure	16c
The Baron of Earlshall	15c
The Baron of Easter Gordon	
The Baron of Echlin	18c
The Baron of Edingight	16c
The Baron of Elie and St Monans	15c
The Baron of Entwistle	1212
The Baron of Esslemont	16c
The Baron of Ethie	
Baron of Eyemouth	18c
The Baron of Fetternear	17c
The Baron of Fingalton	1663
The Baron of Finlaystone Maxwell	17c
The Baron of Finzean	17c
The Baron of Fithie	
The Baron of Fordell	1511
The Baron of Freuch	1559
The Baron of Gala	16c
The Baron of Garrallan	14c
The Baron of Garthland	c. 1637
The Baron of Gartly	15c
The Baron of Gartmore	15c
The Baron of Giffen	1371
Baron of Trearne	1371
Baron of Ramshead	1371
Baron of Stane	1371
The Baron of Gilmerton	1667
The Baron of Glasserton	1542
The Baron of Glencoe	
The Baron of Glendowachy	
The Baron of Gleneagles	
The Baron of Glenfaier	
The Baron of Glenfalloch	14c
The Baron of Glengarnock	
The Baron of Glenluce	c. 1628
The Baron of Glentirian	
The Baron of Gogar	16c
The Baron of Gourdie	16c
The Baron of Gourock	18c
The Baron of Grandhome	17c
The Baron of Grantully	15c
Baron of Greenlaw	1451
The Baron of Greenan	16c
Baron of Clary	17c
The Baron of Greenock	18c
The Baroness of Grougar	1321
The Baron of Haliburton and Lambden	1451
Baron of Hallrule	16c
The Baron of Buncle and Preston	14c
The Baron of Over Liberton	
The Baron of Haddington	16c
The Baron of Hartsyde	1345
The Baron of Herbertshire	1523
The Baron of Horsbrugh	15c
The Baron of Houston	c. 1296
The Baron of Inchdrewer	16c
The Baron of Insch	1528
The Baron of Invermessan	1566
The Baron of Inneryne	10c
The Baron of Innes	17c
The Baron of Inverallochy	
The Baron of Invercauld and Omnalprie	
The Baron of Jedburgh Forest	1602
The Baron of Keith Marischal	1150
The Baron of Kellie	1619
The Baron of Kelly	
The Baron of Kemnay	
The Baron of Kerse	
The Baron of Kersland	
The Baron of Kilbirnie	1600
The Baron of Kilcoy	16c
The Baron of Kilduthie	
The Baron of Kilmichael	1541
Baron of Kilmun	
Baron of Innerwick	15c
The Baron of Kilmaurs	
The Baron of Kilpunt	
The Baron of Kilravock	1293
The Baron of Kinblathmond	
The Baroness of Kincaid	15c
The Baron of Kincraig	16c
The Baron of Kinedar	
The Baron of Kinnaber	
The Baron of Kinnairdy	17c
The Baron of Kinnear	16c
The Baron of Kinross	
The Baron of Kinloch	1686
The Baroness of Kippenross	16c
The Baron of Kirkbuddo	1463
The Baron of Kirkdale	15c
The Baron of Kirkgunzeon	
The Baron of Kirkliston	1618
The Baron of Kirriemuir	1390
The Baron of Kirknewton	17c
The Baron of Kirkton	17c
Burgh of Barony of Kirkstyle	
The Baron of Krawfort	1576
The Baron of Lag	1685
The Baron of Lamberton	c. 1236
The Baron of Lamden	
The Baron of Lamington	
The Baron of Largo	17c
The Baron of Lathallan	17c
The Baron of Lee	1272
The Baron of Lenzie	1170
The Baron of Lescure	15c
The Baron of Leslie (Aberdeenshire)	16c
The Baron of Leslie (Fife)	14c
The Baron of Lesmahagow	
The Baron of Lethendy	17c
The Baron of Lethington	c. 1155
The Baron of Lintrathen	
The Baron of Little Pert	
The Baron of Lochfergus	16c
Baron of Locherwart	
Baron of Heriotmuir	
The Baron of Loch Mullion	c. 1700
The Baron of Lochnaw	1699
The Baron of Lochrounell	c. 1630
The Baron of Logany	c. 1576
The Baron of Logie	
The Baron of Logiealmond	
The Baron of Loncastell	c. 1551
The Baron of Loudoun	12c
The Baron of Lour	1654
The Baron of Lundie	1489
The Baron of Marchmont	17c
Baron of MacDonald	17c
The Baron of MacDougall	1660
The Baron of MacDuff	1039
The Baron of McAuslane of Caldenocht	c. 1395
The Baron of Martyn-Kennedy alias Frethrid	c. 1541
The Baron of Mearns	12c
The Baron of Meigle and Fullerton	1165
The Baron of Melfort	1360
The Baron of Melgund	
The Baron of Melville	
The Baron of Menie	1317
The Baron of Menzies	1510
The Baron of Mertoun	1504
The Baron of Midmar	16c
The Baron of Miltonhaven	1695
The Baron of Mochrum	c. 1472
The Baron of Moncreiffe	1248
Baron of Easter Moncreiffe	1248
The Baron of Montgomeriestoun	c. 1636
The Baron of Mordington	1124
The Baron of Mouswald	1452
The Baron of Moy	17c
The Baron of Mugdock	1458
The Baron of Muirton	1532
The Baron of Mullion	1446
The Baron of Mureth	c. 1514
The Baron of Myrton	c. 1470
The Baron of Newabbay	
The Baron of Newton	1685
The Baron of Niddrie Marischal	1672
The Baron of Ochtercoull	
The Baron of Old Montrose	
The Baron of Ormiston	1637
Baron of Robertland	1539
The Baron of Otterinverane	14c
Baron of Over Cowal	
The Baron of Panbride	
The Baron of Panmure	
The Baron of Park	1563
The Baron of Paistoun	16c
Baron of Penicuik	16c
The Baron of Pentland	1316
Baron of Lochawe	
The Baron of Phantelane	1436
The Baron of Pitcaple	17c
The Baron of Pitcruivie	15c
The Baron of Pitmilly	16c
The Baron of Plean	16c
The Baron of Plenderleith	1306
The Baron of Pluscarden	
The Baron of Portrie	c. 1636
The Baron of Porterfield	
The Baron of Portlethen	18c
The Baron of Poltoun	1726
The Baron of Preston and Prestonpans	1460
The Baron of Prestonfield	
The Baron of Prestoungrange	1189
The Baron of Primside and House Site	
The Baron of Quhithorne	c. 1569
The Baron of Rachane	17c
The Baron of Rannoch	1502
The Baron of Rattray	16c
The Baron of Ravenstone	15c
The Baron of Redcastle	15c
The Baron of Remistoun	c. 1540
Baron of Renfrew	1398
The Baron of Rescobie	
The Baron of Restalrig	
The Baron of Roberton	16c
The Baron of Rossie	17c
The Baron of Ruchlaw	16c
The Baron of Rusco	17c
The Baron of Saint Monance	1596
The Baron of Sauchie	1320
The Baron of Saulset	c. 1629
The Baron of Seabegs	15c
The Baron of Seggieden	1209
The Baron of Skeane	1317
Baron of Hallyards	
The Baron of Smeaton Hepburn	15c
The Baron of Stobo	1577
The Baron of Stonehaven	
The Baron of Stoneywood	15c
The Baron of Strathlachlan	
The Baron of Strichen	1514
The Baron of Struan	16c
The Baron of Swinton	1098
The Baron of Tarbert	
The Baron of Teallach	17c
The Baron of Thainstone	1488
The Baron of Thankerton	
The Baron of Torboll	1360
The Baron of Tranent	16c
The Baron of Traquair	1491
The Baron of Troup	
The Baron of Tulloch	1678
The Baron of Turriff	1592
The Baron of Twynehame	15c
The Baron of Urquhart	1587
The Baron of Waughton	
The Baron of Wedderburn	1413
The Baron of Wells	17c
The Baron of West Niddry	
The Baron of West Nisbet	
The Baron of Winchburgh	15c
The Baron of Wormiston	17c
The Baron of Yair	1806
The Baron of Yeochrie	15c

a: The creation date is the earliest known date for the barony and subject to revision.

b: C before the date is circa around this date of before. C after the date = century.

=== Higher titles ===
- List of Earldoms in the Baronage of Scotland – the third degree of baronage nobility, nobler than Baron (first) and Lord (second)
- List of Marquisates and Dukedoms in the Baronage of Scotland – the noblest forms in the hierarchy
- List of Lordships of Regality – erected in liberam regalitatem

== See also ==
- Commissioner (Scottish Parliament)
- Earls, Marquises and Dukes in the Baronage of Scotland
- English feudal barony
- Irish feudal barony
- Feu
- Laird
- List of extant baronetcies
- List of family seats of Scottish nobility
- List of Marcher lordships (Welsh Marches)
- Lord of Parliament
