= Feudal baron =

Hereditary medieval title

A feudal baron is a vassal holding a heritable fief called a barony, comprising a specific portion of land, granted by an overlord in return for allegiance and service. Following the end of European feudalism, feudal baronies have largely been superseded by baronies held as a rank of nobility, without any attachment to a fief.

== England ==
Historically, the feudal barons of England were the king's tenants-in-chief, that is to say men who held land by feudal tenure directly from the king as their sole overlord and were granted by him a legal jurisdiction (court baron) over their territory, the barony, comprising several manors. Such men, if not already noblemen, (Note: Several of the men granted feudal baronies by William the Conqueror were of obscure Norman origin who had served conspicuously during the Norman Conquest and had revealed valuable personal qualities to a king seeking to establish his rule in a conquered land (e.g. Turstin FitzRolf, feudal baron of North Cadbury)) were ennobled by obtaining such tenure, and had thenceforth an obligation, upon summons by writ, to attend the king's peripatetic court, the earliest form of Parliament and the House of Lords. They thus formed the baronage, which later formed a large part of the peerage of England.

English feudal baronies (and all lesser forms of feudal tenure) were abolished by the Tenures Abolition Act 1660, but the titles/dignities remain. However, long before then the royal summons to attend parliament had been withheld from all but the most powerful feudal barons and had been extended to persons with lesser feudal tenures who had personal qualities fitting them to be royal councillors and thus peers. These latter were barons by writ.

The English feudal barony, or "barony by tenure", now has no legal existence except as an incorporeal hereditament title or dignity. It was the highest form of feudal land tenure, namely per baroniam (Latin for "by barony") under which the land-holder owed the now little understood service of "being one of the king's barons". It must be distinguished from the lesser barony, also feudal, which existed within a county palatine, such as the barony of Halton within the Palatinate of Chester. (Note: Sanders refers to the "Lord" of Halton being the hereditary constable of the County Palatine of Chester, and omits Halton from both his lists) Such barons were merely tenants-in-chief of a prince, whose own overlord was the king.

The duties and privileges owed by feudal barons cannot now be defined exactly, but the main duty certainly was the provision of soldiers to the royal feudal army on demand by the king. A further duty, which involved considerable expense and travel, clearly also a privilege, was the attendance at the king's feudal court, the precursor of Parliament. The principal benefits clearly were

- the revenue generated from rents and production within the demesne lands of the barony;
- the personal power and prestige derived from the feudal service of the tenants, the highest level of whom, lords of their own manors, became knights in the baron's retinue.

The estate-in-land held by barony, if containing a significant castle as its caput and if especially large, that is to say consisting of more than about 20 knight's fees (each loosely equivalent to a manor), was termed an "honour". Constituent manors of a barony were mostly subinfeudated by the baron to his own knights or followers, with a few retained tenantless as his demesne. Most English feudal baronies were converted to baronies of writ or peerage under the Tenures Abolition Act 1660. The baronies not converted became baronies of free socage, a dignity title.

There exist today a very few cases of English families which, had it not been for the 1660 Act, would still be feudal barons of ancient creation. One such is the Berkeley family. Although its Earldom of Berkeley became extinct in 1942 and it recently lost its older peerage title Baron Berkeley to a female line, in 2014 the family still possesses and resides (that is to say retains tenure) as county gentry at Berkeley Castle, the caput of the feudal barony of Berkeley granted by King Henry II (1154–1189) to its direct ancestor in the male line Robert FitzHarding (d.1171), whose son took the surname de Berkeley.

== France ==
Under the Ancien Régime until the abolition of the feudal system in 1789, a French baron was any noble in possession of fief called a barony. As such, possession of the title and the land were in theory inextricably linked. Nevertheless, nobles without any fief of their own might assume the title of baron for themselves.

Under the imperial nobility of Napoleon and the recreated peerage of the Bourbon Restoration, French baronies returned. However, these new baronies were simply titles of nobility and not fiefdoms.

== Papal States ==
Within the Papal States, a feudal barony was commonly known as a luogo baronale (plural luoghi baronali). These were territories held in fief by ecclesiastical institutions or noble families, which exercised civil and judicial jurisdiction over their communities while remaining subject to papal sovereignty. Alongside directly administered lands, the Papal States thus included numerous baronial jurisdictions governed by abbots, cardinals, princes, and other aristocratic lords.

In the early 18th century, feudal lands accounted for a substantial portion of the population and territory of the state. Over time, however, papal legislation increasingly restricted baronial autonomy. Following the restoration of papal rule in 1815, feudal jurisdictions were abolished in several provinces and progressively curtailed elsewhere. The administrative reform of 1816 reorganized the territory into delegations under papal delegates, effectively ending the practical authority of the feudal barons.

== Scotland ==
In contrast to the English equivalent, the dignity of baron is a non-peerage rank of feudal origin in the Baronage of Scotland and is protected by the "Abolition of Feudal Tenure, etc (Scotland) Act 2000" recognised by the crown as a title of nobility with status of minor baron. A Scottish barony is the only UK title of nobility able to be legally alienated from the bloodline of its previous possessor. Hence the Scottish equivalent of an English peerage baron is a Lord of Parliament. The heraldry of Scottish baronies is governed by the court of the Lord Lyon.

== See also ==
- Barony (county division)
