= Auchenhove Castle =

Castle in Aberdeenshire, Scotland

Coordinates: 57.1105°N 2.7364°W

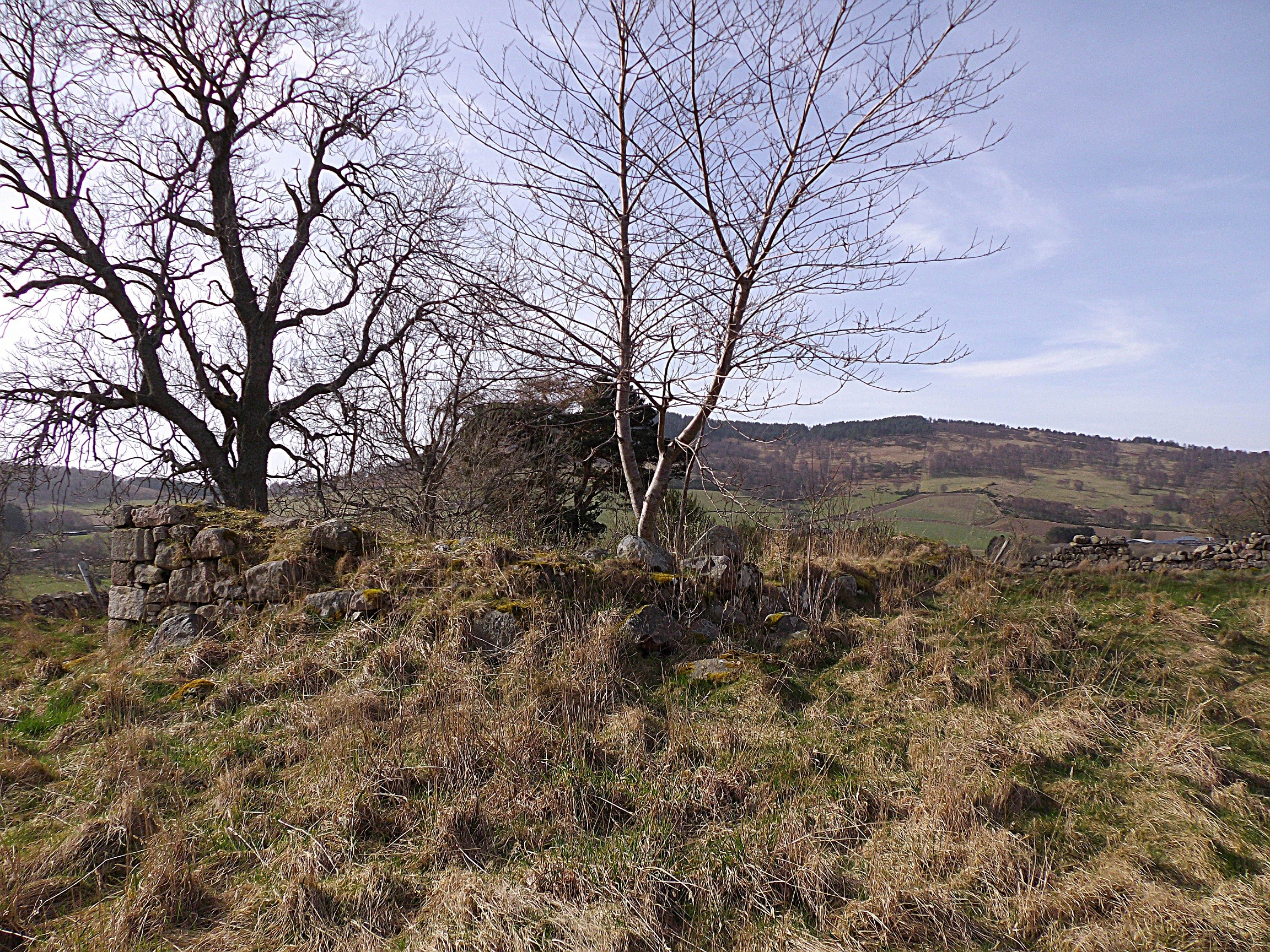
Auchenhove Castle mound

Auchenhove Castle is a castle, of which little remains, dating from the 16th century, 3.5 miles (5.6 km) north-east of Aboyne, at Auchenhove, Aberdeenshire, Scotland.

Escutcheon of the Duguid family

Alternatively, it may be known as Easter Mains of Auchinhove (or East Mains of Auchenhove today).

== History ==
The castle was built by the Duguid family and was owned by the Barony of Auchenhove. It was burned by the army of the Duke of Cumberland in 1746 during the Jacobite rising. The estate belonged to the Duguids from about 1434.

== Structure ==
It appears to have been a late courtyard house, with a causeway approach.
