= Caput baroniae =

Chief seat of a barony

In the customs and laws of the kingdom of England, the caput baroniae (from Latin 'head of the barony') was the ancient, or chief, seat or castle of a nobleman — the primary place of his baronial court. The caput baroniae was not to be divided between multiple daughters (if there was no son to inherit); instead, the whole of it was to descend entirely to the eldest daughter caeteris filiabus aliunde satisfactis, 'other daughters having been satisfied elsewhere'.

The Leges Henrici Primi stated that a lord's tenants would (when escalating disputes or like matters) have to go to the caput of their [land-] lord, even if it was in another county.

The central settlement of an Anglo-Saxon multiple estate (an estate which had main and subsidiary settlements) was called a caput (also short for caput baroniae).

The word is also used for the centre of administration of a hundred, as well as of the early feudal honour.
