= Earls, Marquises and Dukes in the Baronage of Scotland =

Baronial title of Scottish ancient nobility

An Earl/Marquis/Duke in the Baronage of Scotland is an ancient title of nobility that is held en baroneum, which means that its holder, who is a earl/marquis/duke in the Baronage of Scotland, is also always a baron. The holder may or may not be a Lord of Regality, which meant that the holder was appointed by the Crown and had the power of "pit and gallows", meaning the power to authorise the death sentence.

A baronial earl/marquis/duke ranks above both a baron and a lord (being a baron of a higher degree) in the Baronage of Scotland, but below all ranks in the Peerage of Scotland. Earldoms, marquisates and dukedoms in the Baronage of Scotland are very rare.

Since all baronage titles are based in Scots property law and not personal peerages, there are some instances when, for historic reasons, the baronage title happens to share the same name as an extant peerage title, but the current holder of the baronage title is different from the current holder of the peerage title of the same name. The two are not to be confused. Historically, they were held by one and the same person, but the baronage title may subsequently have been disponed according to Scots property law, whereas the peerage title always descends according to the destination in the letters patent of creation of the peerage and the rules of peerage law.

Scottish titles, in order of precedence, are as follows: Duke, Marquis, Earl, Viscount, Lord, Baronet, Knight, Baron, Clan Chief, Esquire/Gentleman. Wallace states that "Lordships, Earldoms, Marquisates and Dukedoms differ only in name from Baronies" but continues "one whose property was erected into a Lordship ranked before a simple Baron" and "A person to whom an Earldom belonged, would be superior to a person who had no more than a lordship ... One, whose lands were incorporated into a Marquisate, was superior to both ... A man, who owned a fief elevated into a Dukedom, was exaulted above all three." However, Lord Stair states that Lordships or Earldoms are "but more noble titles of a Barony".

== Modern status ==
In 2014 the Lord Lyon King of Arms issued the "Note on the Petition of George Menking", under which he determined to accept petitions for the grant arms for baronage dignities including Earldoms, Marquisates and Dukedoms since such dignities have historically always been of the genus of a barony and as such represent a higher form of barony and fall within the jurisdiction of the King of Arms.

The Menking Note is considered an important change (and return to similar status of an earlier Lord Lyon) from an interim ruling on the petition in 2010 by a Swiss national Willi Ernst Sturzenegger, who had purchased the feudal Earldom of Arran, and wished to be titled as 'Willi Ernst Sturzenegger of Arran, Earl of Arran in the territorial baronage of Scotland' or 'Sturzenegger of Arran, holder of the territorial Earldom of Arran", or 'Sturzenegger of Arran, holder of the feudal Earldom of Arran'. In 2006, an earlier Lord Lyon had recognised three petitioners as "Feudal Countess of Crawfurd-Lindsay", "Feudal Earl of Breadalbane" and "Feudal Earl of Rothes". In the ruling in 2010, the Lord Lyon stated that as a general rule previous decisions should be followed, but he could not agree with them as the arguments in the previous cases did not appear to have been tested and no reasoning had been given by the prior Lord Lyon for his decisions. The title "feudal Earl", "territorial Earl", or simply "Earl", being used or recognised in respect of an assemblage of lands into an earldom had never existed until recently. He stated that while the Abolition of Feudal Tenure Act of 2000 divorced feudal baronies from land title, it preserved the title of baron. This was not the case he found with "territorial" or "feudal earldoms": "On the contrary there is a clear break between the type of territorial earldoms which existed before the evolution of a personal peerage, and the later erection of lands into what has been termed a “territorial earldom”. He therefore did not accept that it follows from the recognition of a feudal baron, or one possessed of the dignity of a former feudal barony, as “Baron of X”, that the person in possession of a “territorial earldom” stemming from the erection by the Crown of lands into a free earldom, should be recognised as an “Earl” or “Countess”, “feudal” or otherwise." Since then, in April 2015 the Lord Lyon changed his mind and he may recognise a person possessing a barony (and other titles that are but nobler titles of baron within the Baronage of Scotland lord/earl/marquis/duke) on petition.

== List of Earldoms in the Baronage of Scotland ==
Below is anincomplete list of Earldoms created in the baronage, please help by filling in details below (with reference links).

Titles in italics are subsidiary baronial titles held by the same earl. Titles with The before the name is the holder's primary title.

Title	C.	Infeft	Incumbent	Heir	Notes
The Earl of Aboyne	1676	2016	Christiano Arnhold Simoes, Earl of Aboyne	Hannah Arnhold Simões, Mistress of Aboyne	
The Earl of Arran	17c	2023	Susan Clarke Livingston, 22nd Countess of Arran, Lady Balquidder		
The Earl of Breadalbane	17c	2023	Alan MacKay		
The Earl of Crawfurd-Lindsay	17c	2004	Abigail Busch Reisinger, Countess of Crawfurd-Lindsay, Baroness of Auchterutherstruther		Father is Baron of Inneryne
The Earl of Eglinton	1607		Hugh Montgomerie, 19th Earl of Eglinton	Rhuridh, Lord Montgomerie	
The Earl of Erroll	1546	2021	Dr David Willien, 19th Earl of Erroll, 17th Baron of Tulloch		
Earl of Lennox	1594	2017	Charles Gordon-Lennox, 11th Duke of Richmond	Charles Gordon-Lennox, Earl of March and Kinrara	
The Earl of Orkney	1603	1998	Peter St John, 9th Earl of Orkney	Oliver St John, Viscount Kirkwall	
The Earl of Rothes	1458	2024	Dario Item, Earl of Rothes and Sheriff of Fife		
The Earl of Wigtoun	1606	2004	Dr Roland Zettel, Earl of Wigtoun, Lord of Cumbernauld		

Note that some peerage titles of feudal origin sometimes have a duplicate baronage title of the same name either held by the current peer or transferred to a new holder.

== List of Marquisates and Dukedoms in the Baronage of Scotland ==
The below are very rare, only two baronage titles are known to continue existing until today.

The Scots spelling of marquis, as a rule, follows the French spelling, rather than the English spelling "marquess".

Title	C.	Infeft	Arms	Incumbent	Heir	Notes
The Marquis of Huntly	1684					The Marquisate, Earldom and Lordship of Huntly was disponed to a non-peer in 1930s, holder known as Marquis or Lord interchangeably; According to the Lord Lyon, as at 2009, "...a Petition had previously been lodged on 27th May 1992 by Dennistoun Gordon Teall of Teallach narrating that he had “acquired right and title to the feudal Marquisate, Earldom and Lordship of Huntly” by disposition ... dated 22 November 1991, recorded 3 January 1992".
The Duke of Albany	1565	Extinct				
The Duke of Hamilton	1661	2010		Alexander Douglas-Hamilton, 16th Duke of Hamilton	Douglas Douglas-Hamilton, Marquis of Douglas	peer's title has feudal origins
The Duke of Lennox	1581	Extinct				
The Duke of Montrose	1488	Extinct				

== List of Lordships in the Baronage of Scotland ==
Lord is the second degree of baronage nobility, nobler than Baron (first) but not before Earl (third), Marquess (fourth) or Duke (fifth).

Click here for a list of Lordships in the Baronage of Scotland

== List of Baronies in the Baronage of Scotland ==
The first degree of baronage nobility.

Click here for a list of Baronies in the Baronage of Scotland

== List of Lordships of Regality ==
Higher dignities compared to baronage titles, erected in liberam regalitatem.

Click here for a list of Lordships of Regality

== See also ==
- Lords in the Baronage of Scotland
- Baronage of Scotland
- Peerage of Scotland
