= Marcialonga =

Annual Italian cross-country skiing competition

Coordinates: 46.3289°N 11.6020°E

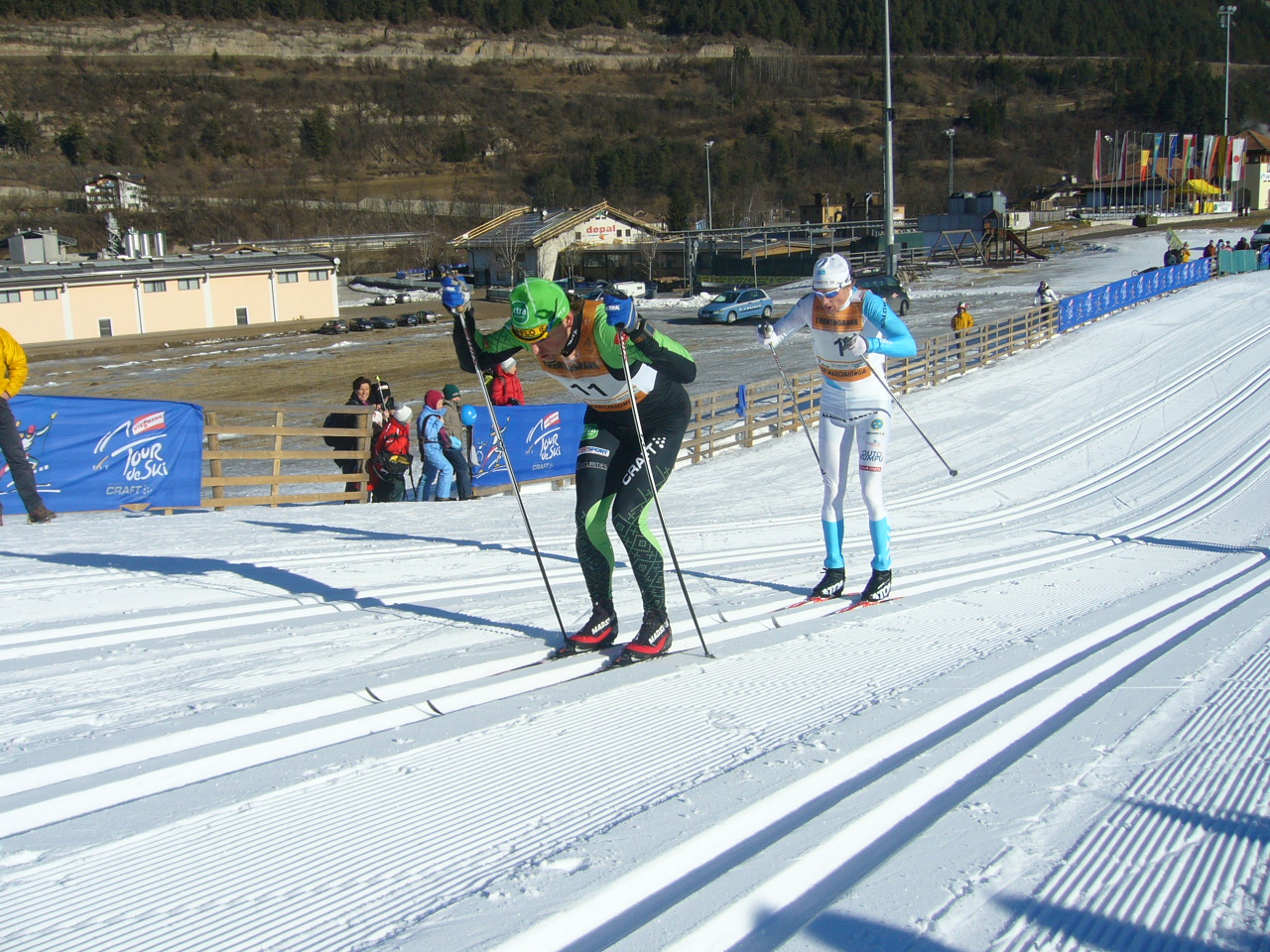
- Swedes Jerry Ahrlin and Oskar Svärd duelling in the 2011 men's edition
- Status: active
- Genre: sporting event
- Date: last Sunday of January
- Frequency: annual
- Country: Italy
- Inaugurated: 1971 (men); 1978 (women)

Marcialonga is a cross-country ski race which is arranged for the last Sunday in January in Trentino in Italy. It was first held in 1971 and is part of the international Worldloppet federation of ski marathons.

The run begins in Moena, where the skiers first go further up Fassa Valley and along Canazei, passing Moena on its way alongside Cavalese in the Fiemme Valley.

Marcialonga runs in classic style, and is 70 km long, but in 2007, 2015 and 2017, it was shortened to 57 km due to snow problems. In 1975, 1989 and 1990 it was cancelled due to the total lack of snow on the track. A shorter race, Marcialonga light, is 45 km, and goes from Moena to Predazzo.

Official Tour Operators to Marcialonga for English speaking skiers are Globalrunners based in Europe and Lumi Experiences based in Vermont, USA.

== History ==
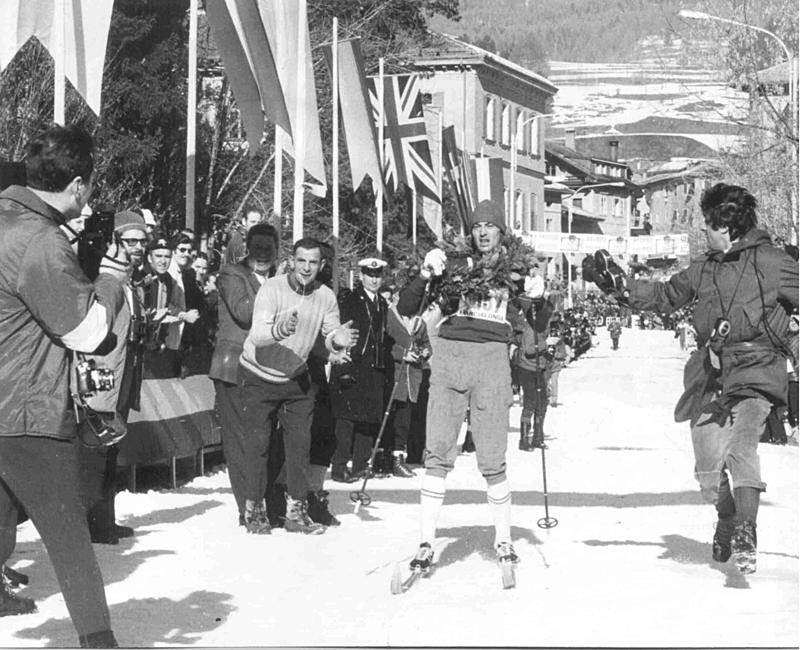
Ulrico Kostner, winner of first edition in 1971

In the summer of 1970 four Italian friends (Mario Cristofolini, Giulio Giovannini, Roberto Moggio, and Nele Zorzi) decided to organize in Fiemme Valley a ski marathon that would trace, in some way, the legendary Vasaloppet, historical and well-known Swedish cross-country skiing competition, in which they had participated the previous winter.

On 7 February 1971 the first edition of the "Marcialonga di Fiemme e Fassa" was held: the four organizers, who had believed in the project, expected about one hundred participants, instead 1,157 skiers arrived to compete along the 70 km of the route immersed in the Trentino valleys. The first race was won by Ulrico Kostner in front of the favourite Franco Nones, gold medalist at the 1968 Winter Olympics in Grenoble.

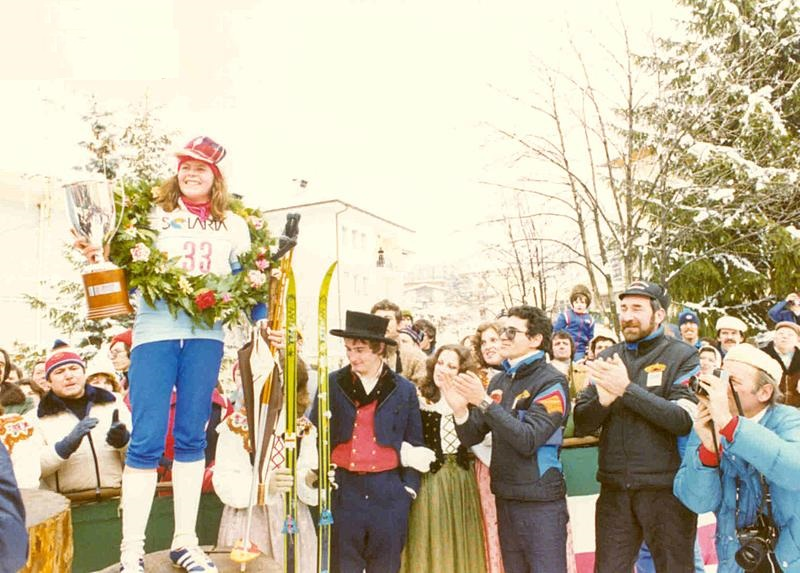
Dominique Robert, first woman to win at Marcialonga in 1978

First 6 editions of Marcialonga were reserved only to men, even if already since 1972 some women tried to participate in the race, disguising themselves also with fake moustaches or using fake male names. In 1977 there were 14 women disqualified at the finish line, where a banner was displayed with the words "Marcialonga forbidden to women: why?". So, starting from 1978 the cross-country marathon was officially opened also to the female category, in which the French Dominique Robert won.

Due to the lack of snow, the event did not take place in 1975, 1989, and 1990, while in many other editions the route was shortened. In 1994 the Marcialonga took place with the shortest route, of only 45 km with arrival in Predazzo: in that edition the German Johann Mühlegg and the Italian Silvano Barco crossed the finish line with exactly the same time and were therefore both declared winners on equal merit. In 1999 the same Johann Mühlegg (who had changed nationality in the meantime) won a second time ex aequo with his Spanish fellow Juan Jesús Gutiérrez, this time on the 70 km route.

In 2004 the Marcialonga was included in the Cross-country Ski World Cup: among the women, for Gabriella Paruzzi, the victory in the Trentino race for the conquest of the crystal cup was decisive. Some top athletes did not participate, fearing to exhaust their energies in view of the continuation of the season.

On 22 February 2003, the Autonomous Province of Trento awarded the four "founding fathers" of the Marcialonga with the seal of San Venceslao as a sign of gratitude and homage.

In 2013, the memorable year in which the Fiemme Valley hosted for the third time the Nordic Ski World Championships and the cross-country skiing competitions of the XXVI Winter Universiade, the highest number of participants was registered, with 7,570 athletes. Another peculiarity of the 40th edition was the lengthening of the route (72 km, instead of the classic 70 km) to allow transit through the town centers of Canazei and Predazzo.

== Track ==
The Marcialonga track (which can be covered with cross-country skis throughout the winter season and on foot, with roller skis, by bicycle and on horseback in the summer months) crosses the entire Fassa Valley and then Fiemme valley: it is 69.38 kilometres (43.11 mi) long, with a total difference in height of about 1,030 metres (3,380 ft). The average skiing time is about 3 hours and 13 minutes at an average speed of 21.5 km/h.

The race starts from the so-called "plain" of Moena, located at an altitude of 1,150 metres (3,770 ft) above sea level, at the gates of the town near the municipal stadium. The morning start is one of the most spectacular moments of the competition and it takes place in line and in steps: the first to start are the "senators" (those who have participated continuously in all editions since 1971) together with the strongest professional athletes; at the center, the skiers who in previous editions have obtained a good placement; at the last, all the remaining amateur sportsmen, affectionately called "the bisons".

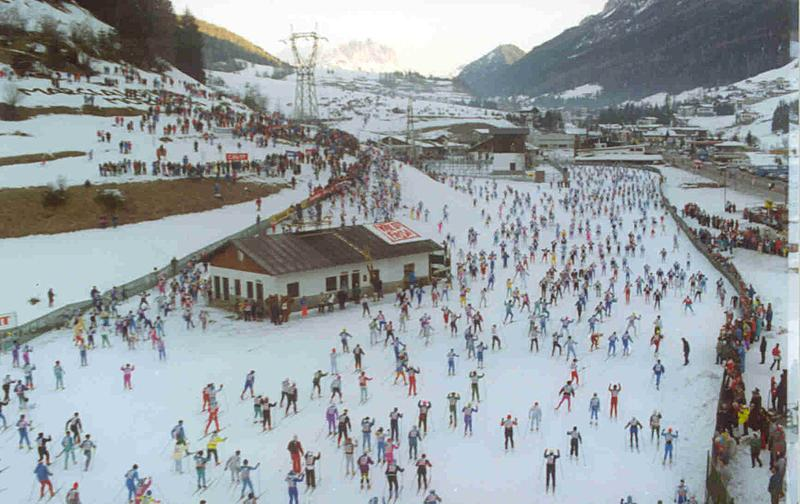
Skiers in Moena going to Canazei in 1991

After the start, the track goes on the right bank of the Avisio stream: the skiers face the first ascent towards the Moena Alpine Training Centre of the State Police and go up the whole Fassa Valley. Near Soraga di Fassa, they cross the Avisio stream and reach Vigo di Fassa where, in the locality of San Giovanni, there is the second climb, short but unequivocally nicknamed "legbreaker" (Spacagiames in the local dialect). Then the race passez through the villages of Pozza di Fassa, Mazzin, Campitello di Fassa up to the control point of Canazei, at 1,430 metres (4,690 ft) above sea level, where is located the first turning point.

The trail goes back, finally downhill, from Canazei again till Soraga di Fassa, where skiers face the third climb, so called "The Endless" (L'Infinita), because of its length that requires considerable effort, considering that after the long descent from Canazei, the athletes' muscles have cooled down. Descending from the hamlet of Someda, they cross the entire town centre of Moena, continuing straight on towards the next Fiemme Valley. After passing the "Giuseppe Dal Ben" Ski Jump Arena, skiers reach the town of Predazzo, where there is the finish line of the half race (Marcialonga light) near the former railway station. Arriving in Ziano di Fiemme there is a short climb called Diaol del Gaso, where athletes are warmly encouraged by the public.

Once in the lower Fiemme Valley, the trail crosses the municipality of Panchià and Tesero (with a passage in the Lago di Tesero Cross Country Stadium). After the waterfall (La Cascata) in Masi di Cavalese, it is located the second point control point at Molina di Fiemme, at the lowest altitude (800 metres (2,600 ft) above sea level): here takes place the second turning point, back in the direction of Cavalese.

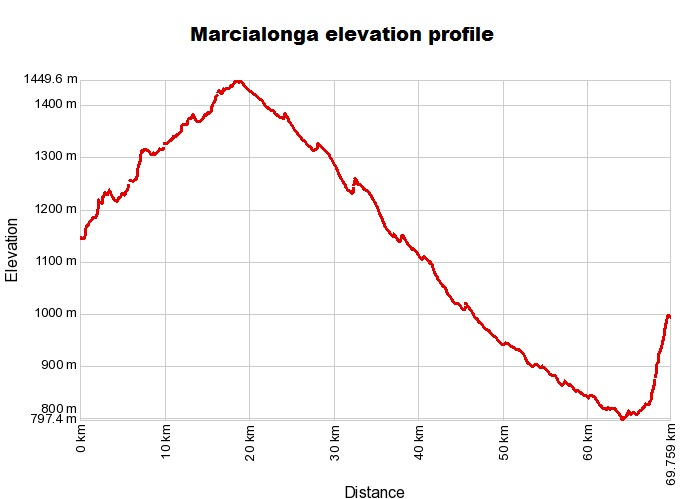
Marcialonga elevation profile

Returning to the "Cascata" (waterfall), it is where the stretch considered the hardest and most selective of the race begins: from there it starts the last 2.5 kilometres (1.6 mi) of the challenging final ramp, called "Full Gas" or simply "ascent of the waterfall" (salita della cascata), which with its 144 meters of elevation gain (with slopes of up to 12%) leads to the arrival in Mendini boulevard in Cavalese. At the finish line, the winner is welcomed with a laurel wreath.

Athletes who do not wish to reach the final finish in Cavalese can stop at the 45th km near Predazzo, where the finish line of the Marcialonga light classification is located.

In 2007, 2015, and 2017, due to the lack of snow, the race was shortened to 57 km (starting from Mazzin in the direction of Canazei and back to Cavalese), using of artificial snow. The cost of the snowmaking program, which involves the production, movement and preparation of more than 70-80,000 cubic meters of snow, has cost about 200,000 euros in 2015: however, it has been estimated that the total turnover of the event amounts to about 8 million euros spent by participants, escorts and spectators.

== Participants ==
Every year many thousands of skiers participate at the Marcialonga: in 2017 6,983 athletes were registered.

The competitors who have participated in all editions of the Marcialonga are called "senators" or "pioneers", while the amateur skiers who start in the last step are jokingly called "bisons".

The winners of the men's and women's categories are welcomed on finish line by the Soreghina, a girl elected from the towns crossed by the Marcialonga and who wears the traditional dress of her town. The Soreghina is in charge of rewarding the winners with a large laurel wreath, stuck (or sometimes thrown at speed) on the shoulders of the athlete. However, even the last competitor to arrive at Cavalese in the dark of the evening is warmly welcomed with an identical laurel wreath and celebrated as the winner.

== Skiing style ==
The race took place in the first editions with the classic technique, the only one used at the time. Later it was introduced the free style: in 1985 Giorgio Vanzetta won the Marcialonga using skating style for the first time.

In 2003, the race returned to the classic technique, which allowed to better exploit the width of the track in a race that sees at least 5,000 competitors at the start.

In the same year, however, the brothers Anders Aukland and Jørgen Aukland introduced for the first time in Italy the so-called "hybrid style" of double poling, the evolution of the sliding thrust: this new technique, invented in 1993 by Staffan Larsson and still formally considered within the classical technique, consists in repetitively pushing rigid bust legs on parallel skis only with the force of the arms and with both poles (longer than normal ones) also parallel, for all the 70 km of the ski marathon, including the terrible final climb of the Waterfall. To limit the use of the double poling, which in fact distorted the classical technique, in the past the variation of the Marcialonga route has been proposed, including also the very hard climb of the Alpe Cermis (already used in the Tour de Ski competitions); however, this proposal has been very criticized, especially by amateur skiers, due its hardness.

== Winners ==
The first skier to win the Marcialonga in 1971 was the South Tyrolean Ulrico Kostner, ahead of favourite Franco Nones.

The athlete who has achieved the most victories in the Marcialonga has been the Italian Maria Canins, who in addition to the 9 consecutive victories from 1979 to 1988 has always inflicted very heavy detachments to his rivals. Guidina Dal Sasso has won five editions.

In the men's category, the skiers with the most victories were the Italian Maurilio De Zolt and the Norwegian Jørgen Aukland, with 4 victories each. Moreover, in 2008 and 2012 the Aukland brothers, who came in first and second place, have created a unique "family double win", very rare for this kind of competitions. Tord Asle Gjerdalen is the only man to have won three consecutive editions.

In 1994 and 1999 there were two ex aequo winners, with exactly the same timing, and one of them was Johann Mühlegg in both the editions.

=== Men ===
Year	Name	Nation
1971	Ulrico Kostner	Italy
1972	Pauli Siitonen	Finland
1973	Lars Arne Bölling	Sweden
1974	Magnar Lundemo	Norway
1975	Cancelled	
1976	Tonino Biondini	Italy
1977	Jean-Paul Pierrat	France
1978	Ulrico Kostner	Italy
1979	Jorma Kinnunen	Finland
1980	Ivan Garanin	Soviet Union
1981	Sven-Åke Lundbäck	Sweden
1982	Dag Atle Bjørkheim	Norway
1983	Walter Mayer	Austria
1984	Bengt Hassis	Sweden
1985	Giorgio Vanzetta	Italy
1986	Maurilio De Zolt	Italy
1987	Anders Blomquist	Sweden
1988	Albert Walder	Italy
1989	Cancelled	
1990	Cancelled	
1991	Maurilio De Zolt	Italy
1992	Maurilio De Zolt	Italy
1993	Michail Botvinov	Austria
1994	Johann Mühlegg	Germany
1995	Hervé Balland	France
1996	Maurizio Pozzi	Italy
1997	Michail Botvinov	Austria
1998	Michail Botvinov	Austria
1999	Johann Mühlegg	Germany
2000	Fulvio Valbusa	Italy
2001	Juan Jesús Gutiérrez	Spain
2002	Juan Jesús Gutiérrez	Spain
2003	Jørgen Aukland	Norway
2004	Anders Aukland	Norway
2005	Stanislav Řezáč	Czech Republic
2006	Jørgen Aukland	Norway
2007	Jerry Ahrlin	Sweden
2008	Anders Aukland	Norway
2009	Jerry Ahrlin	Sweden
2010	Oskar Svärd	Sweden
2011	Jerry Ahrlin	Sweden
2012	Jørgen Aukland	Norway
2013	Jørgen Aukland	Norway
2014	Simen Østensen	Norway
2015	Tord Asle Gjerdalen	Norway
2016	Tord Asle Gjerdalen	Norway
2017	Tord Asle Gjerdalen	Norway
2018	Ilia Chernousov	Russia
2019	Petter Eliassen	Norway
2020	Tore Bjørseth Berdal	Norway
2021	Emil Persson	Sweden
2022	Ermil Vokuev	Russia
2023	Emil Persson	Sweden
2024	Runar Skaug Mathisen	Norway
2025	Andreas Nygaard	Norway
2026	Kasper Stadaas	Norway

=== Women ===
Year	Name	Nation
1978	Dominique Robert	France
1979	Maria Canins	Italy
1980	Maria Canins	Italy
1981	Maria Canins	Italy
1982	Maria Canins	Italy
1983	Maria Canins	Italy
1984	Maria Canins	Italy
1985	Maria Canins	Italy
1986	Maria Canins	Italy
1987	Maria Canins	Italy
1988	Maria Canins	Italy
1989	Cancelled	
1990	Cancelled	
1991	Guidina Dal Sasso	Italy
1992	Tatiana Bondareva	Russia
1993	Tatiana Bondareva	Russia
1994	Yelena Kalugina	Russia
1995	Eugenia Bitchougova	Russia
1996	Guidina Dal Sasso	Italy
1997	Guidina Dal Sasso	Italy
1998	Guidina Dal Sasso	Italy
1999	Guidina Dal Sasso	Italy
2000	Svetlana Nageykina	Russia
2001	Irina Skladneva	Russia
2002	Anna Santer	Italy
2003	Lara Peyrot	Italy
2004	Gabriella Paruzzi	Italy
2005	Cristina Paluselli	Italy
2006	Cristina Paluselli	Italy
2007	Hilde Gjermundshaug Pedersen	Norway
2008	Jenny Hansson	Sweden
2009	Hilde Gjermundshaug Pedersen	Norway
2010	Jenny Hansson	Sweden
2011	Seraina Boner	Switzerland
2012	Susanne Nyström	Sweden
2013	Seraina Boner	Switzerland
2014	Yulia Tikhonova	Russia
2015	Katerina Smutna	Austria
2016	Britta Johansson Norgren	Sweden
2017	Katerina Smutna	Czech Republic
2018	Britta Johansson Norgren	Sweden
2019	Britta Johansson Norgren	Sweden
2020	Kari Vikhagen Gjeitnes	Norway
2021	Lina Korsgren	Sweden
2022	Ida Dahl	Sweden
2023	Magni Smedås	Norway
2024	Emilie Fleten	Norway
2025	Emilie Fleten	Norway
2026	Emilie Fleten	Norway

== Related events ==
In addition to the classic Marcialonga which takes place on the last Sunday of January, other cross country ski events are organized, including:

- Marcialonga baby, reserved for skiers under 6 years of age who, on the previous Friday, use the classic technique to cover about 100 meters of snow in the center of Predazzo;
- Mini Marcialonga, for children aged 6 to 12 years, on the classic technique route of 3 km on the ring of the Lago di Tesero cross-country stadium. The race takes place on the previous Saturday;
- Marcialonga young, for young athletes of the categories boys, students, aspirants and juniors (who, being minors, can not participate in the regular Marcialonga) and who compete on routes of 4-9-14 km at the Lagodi Tesero Stadium;
- Marcialonga story, introduced in 2013 to celebrate the 40th edition, is a competition in which skiers can participate only with vintage materials before 1976 (i.e. wooden cross-country skis, leather boots with square toe and bamboo rackets), the year in which was introduced a new type of binding with a width of less than 75 mm; materials must be certified and entered in the special "register of vintage cross-country skis", kept by the organization. The event takes place on the previous Saturday, on a classic technique track of 11 km that goes from Lago di Tesero to Predazzo, uphill and in the opposite direction to the Marcialonga. From the year 2017, each kilometer of the historic route has been dedicated to a person or an organization that has played a decisive role in the history of the territory: the kilometer zero is dedicated to the Municipality of Tesero.

In addition to the cross-country skiing competition, two other competitions have been instituted, which are considered "sister competitions":

- Marcialonga Cycling, a 135 km race to be covered in June by bike on the route that starts from Predazzo, goes up from Aldino to Monte San Pietro, the passes of Lavazé (Tesero), San Pellegrino (Moena) and Valles, and finally ends again in Predazzo;
- Marcialonga Running, a 26 km walking race organised in September on the summer track of the Marcalonga from Moena to Cavalese.

For those who take part in all three races (cross-country skiing, cycling and running) there is a special "combined" classification.

== Culture ==
The event is followed by many sports journalists and is broadcast in Eurovision and live by Rai and other international television channels, thus also contributing to the promotion of the territory.

For each of the editions, two special philatelic cancellations have always been made on the occasion of the event, one at the place of departure in Moena and one at the arrival in Cavalese. In some editions up to four stamps have been made, including the intermediate arrivals of Canazei and Predazzo.
