= Gsieser-Tal-Lauf =

Italian cross-country skiing race

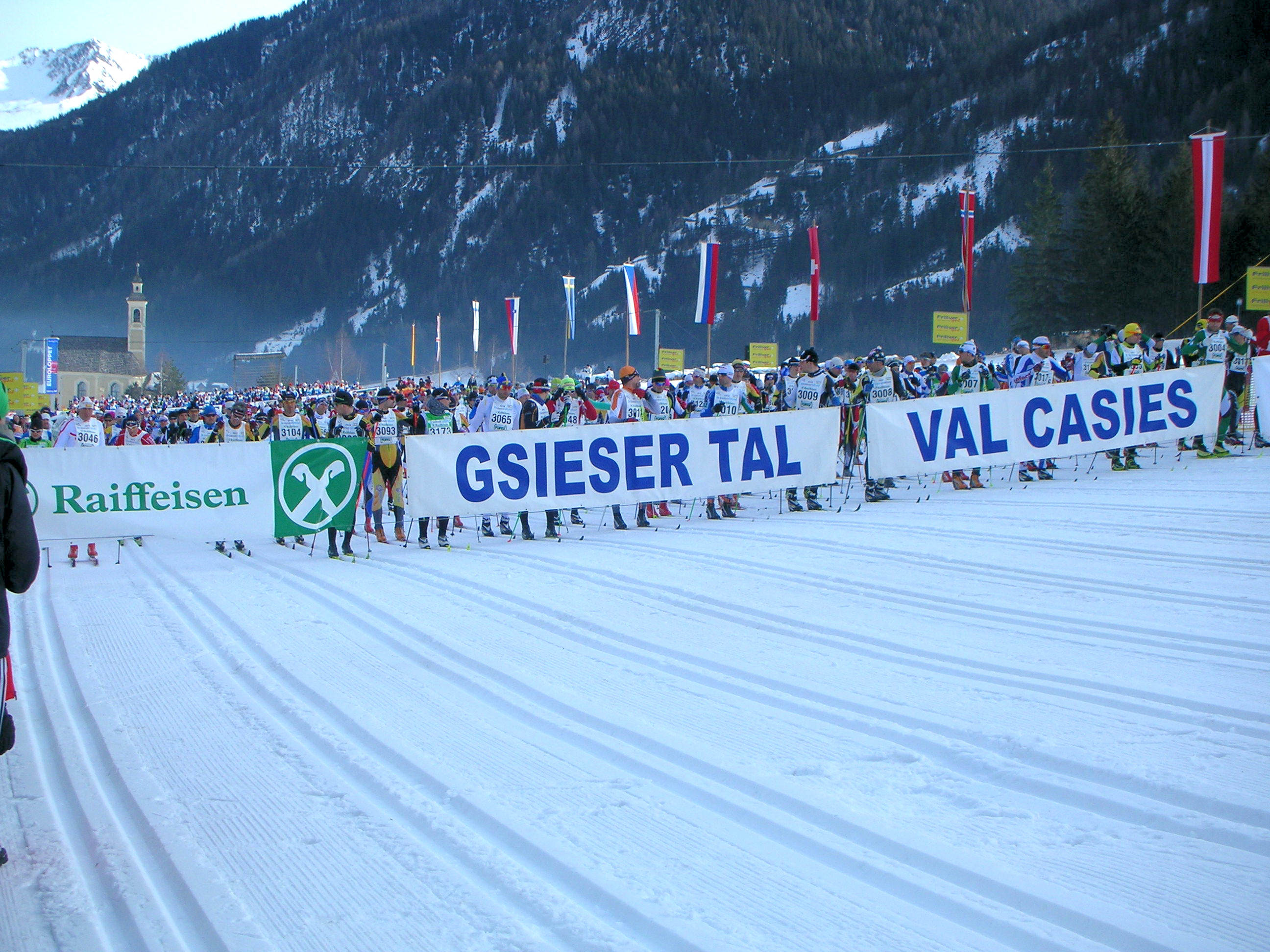
Start Gsieser Tal Lauf 2012

The Gsieser-Tal-Lauf (Italian: Gran Fondo Val Casies) is a cross-country skiing race that takes place every year on the third weekend in February in the Gsiesertal in South Tyrol, Italy.

It is the largest mass winter sports event in South Tyrol and the second largest in Italy. The event has never been cancelled (except in 2021 / COVID-19) since the race was first held in 1984, a unique record in Europe. Every year around 2,300 people from over 35 nations take part in the race.

== Course ==
The loop route from Gsieser Tal to Taisten begins and ends in St. Martin in Gsies (1,220 m a.s.l.). The route distances are 30 km and 42 km, for both classic and skating styles, and both races feature a wave-start format.

Age-group categories are also awarded. There are 6 points classifications, 3 for the classic races and 3 for the skating races, and all races count towards the Euroloppet Series. The "KIDS Run" is traditionally held on Saturday afternoon.

The Gsieser-Tal-Lauf also includes a non-ranked "Just For Fun" category for non-competitive participants who want to enjoy the special marathon atmosphere.

== Taking part ==
Skiers aged 16 and over are eligible to take part. For the 42 km race, competitors must be aged 18 or over. Competitors are split into 4 different start waves. Timing is recorded by means of an electronic chip. Each participant receives a certificate of participation and a race medal. Entry fees are staggered, and are based on the date of registration. Online registration begins on 1 June every year.

== Winners ==
=== Winners skating 42 km ===
Year	Male	Nationality	Time	Female	Nationality	Time
2025	Mikael Abram	Italy	1:36:03 h	Christina Pittin	Italy	1:44:40 h
2024	Giandomenico Salvadori	Italy	1:36:07 h	Federica Sanfilippo	Italy	1:48:12 h
2023	Lorenzo Romano	Italy	1:39:09 h	Sigrid Mutscheller	Germany	1:53:27 h
2022	Lorenzo Romano	Italy	1:40:09 h	Ilenia Defrancesco	Italy	1:54:19 h
2021	canceled (COVID-19)					
2020	Mirco Bertolina	Italy	1:37:40 h	Sara Pellegrini	Italy	1:45:53 h
2019	Alexei Tscherwotkin	Russia	1:42:14 h	Riitta-Liisa Roponen	Finland	1:53:02 h
2018	Stefano Gardener	Italy	1:47:57 h	Antonella Confortola	Italy	2:04:29 h
2017	Anders Gløersen	Norway	1:38:01 h	Natalja Sernowa	Russia	1:52:21 h
2016	Mirco Bertolina	Italy	1:42:40 h	Walentyna Schewtschenko	Ukraine	1:57:25 h
2015	Giorgio Di Centa	Italy	1:41:30 h	Natalja Sernowa	Russia	1:57:25 h
2014	Fabrizio Clementi	Italy	1:41:21 h	Stephanie Santer	Italy	1:54:27 h
2013	Roland Clara	Italy	1:39:09 h	Antonella Confortola Wyatt	Italy	1:51:53 h
2012	Roland Clara	Italy	1:36:24 h	Antonella Confortola Wyatt	Italy	1:47:48 h
2011	Thomas Moriggl	Italy	1:22:20 h	Antonella Confortola Wyatt	Italy	1:29:25 h
2010	Alexandre Rousselet	France	1:29:47 h	Clara Bettega	Italy	1:42:03 h
2009	Tom Reichelt	Germany	1:29:07 h	Daniela Jellici	Italy	1:41:48 h
2008	Tom Reichelt	Germany	1:27:01 h	Veronica de Martin Pinter	Italy	1:44:27 h
2007	Maurizio Pozzi	Italy	1:28:28 h	Stefanie Meyr	Germany	1:40:08 h
2006	Florian Kostner	Italy	1:35:48 h	Anna Santer	Italy	1:48:37 h
2005	Maurizio Pozzi	Italy	1:41:03 h	Lara Peyrot	Italy	1:46:58 h
2004	Marco Cattaneo	Italy	1:29:58 h	Lara Peyrot	Italy	1:42:28 h
2003	Juan Jesús Gutiérrez	Spain	1:33:55 h	Eugenia Bitchougova	Russia	1:48:32 h
2002 (40 km)	Alois Blassnig	Austria	1:12:43 h	Eugenia Bitchougova	Russia	1:18:16 h
2001	Ole Einar Bjørndalen	Norway	1:28:43 h	Antonella Confortola Wyatt	Italy	1:38:28 h
2000	Silvio Fauner	Italy	1:37:30 h	Maria Canins	Italy	1:50:35 h
1999	Cristian Zorzi	Italy	1:30:23 h	Guidina Dal Sasso	Italy	1:44:04 h
1998	Michail Botwinow	Austria	1:27:11 h	Eugenia Bitchougova	Russia	1:37:35 h
1997	Roberto De Zolt	Italy	1:27:18 h	Eugenia Bitchougova	Russia	1:36:01 h
1996	Silvio Fauner	Italy	1:28:42 h	Eugenia Bitchougova	Russia	1:42:13 h
1995	Taufik Khamitov	Kazakhstan	1:41:38 h	Maria Canins	Italy	1:55:27 h
1994	Alfred Runggaldier	Italy	1:37:34 h	Maria Canins	Italy	1:47:54 h
1993 (30 km)	Alfred Runggaldier	Italy	1:26,19 h	Nathalie Santer	Italy	1:34:07 h
1992 (40 km)	Paolo Riva	Italy	1:28:26 h	Maria Canins	Italy	1:40:30 h
1991 (40 km)	Patrizio Deola	Italy	1:31:43 h	Maria Canins	Italy	1:48:31 h
1990 (40 km)	Luciano Fontana	Italy	1:25:45 h	Giovanna Vego Socco	Italy	2:11:32 h
1989 (30 km)	Patrizio Deola	Italy	1:09:44 h	Maria Canins	Italy	1:19:01 h
1988 (40 km)	Alfred Runggaldier	Italy	1:31:57 h	Maria Canins	Italy	1:41:15 h
1987 (40 km)	Luciano Fontana	Italy	2:08:10 h	Maria Canins	Italy	2:14:25 h
1986 (40 km)	Giuseppe Ploner	Italy	1:34:31 h	Maria Canins	Italy	1:50:14 h
1985 (40 km)	Friedrich Nöckler	Italy	1:56:42 h	Loretta de Monte	Italy	3:04:38 h
1984 (40 km)	Albert Walder	Italy	1:58:11 h	Johanna Rehmann	Italy	2:56:35 h

=== Winners skating 30 km ===
Year	Male	Female
2025	Matteo Tanel Italy	Ilona Plechacova Czech Republic
2024	Giacomo Gabrielli Italy	Julia Kuen Italy
2023	Patrick Klettenhammer Italy	Federica Sanfilippo Italy
2022	Matteo Tanel Italy	Martina Bellini Italy
2021	canceled (COVID-19)	
2020	Florian Cappello Italy	Martina Di Centa Italy
2019	Clemens Blaßnig Austria	Barbara Jezeršek Australia
2018	Matteo Tanel Italy	Debora Roncari Italy
2017	Enrico Nizzi Italy	Elisa Brocard Italy
2016	Jiri Rocarek Czech Republic	Debora Roncari Italy
2015	Eric Thomas Germany	Barbara Jezeršek Slovenia
2014	Simone Paredi Italy	Melissa Gorra Italy
2013	Simone Paredi Italy	Barbara Felderer Italy
2012	Enrico Nizzi Italy	Veronika Vítková Czech Republic
2011	Bruno Debertolis Italy	Eugenia Bitchougova Italy
2010	Candide Pralong Switzerland	Picon Anouk Faivre France
2009	Dietmar Nöckler Italy	Magda Genuin Italy
2008	Christian Cusini Italy	Karin Moroder Italy

=== Winners classic 42 km ===
Year	Male	Nationality	Time	Female	Nationality	Time
2025	Francesco Ferrari	Italy	1:46:42 h	Michaela Patscheider	Italy	1:58:57 h
2024	Lorenzo Busin	Italy	1:46:57 h	Heli Heiskanen	Finland	2:04:20 h
2023	Lorenzo Busin	Italy	1:47:24 h	Malin Börjesjö	Sweden	2:08:19 h
2022	Dietmar Nöckler	Italy	1:55:38 h	Malin Börjesjö	Sweden	2:13:22 h
2021	canceled (COVID-19)					
2020	Mauro Brigadoi	Italy	1:47:29 h	Klara Moravcova	Czech Republic	2:04:25 h
2019	Oskar Kardin	Sweden	1:51:05 h	Justyna Kowalczyk	Poland	2:04:09 h
2018	Jewgeni Dementjew	Russia	1:52:52 h	Franziska Müller	Germany	2:16:23 h
2017	Mauro Brigadoi	Italy	1:50:06 h	Jessica Müller	Germany	2:16:05 h
2016	Dietmar Nöckler	Italy	1:43:38 h	Kateřina Smutná	Austria	1:52:31 h
2015	Petr Novák	Czech Republic	1:48:18 h	Renate Forstner	Germany	2:30:48 h
2014	Franz Göring	Germany	1:52:05 h	Adela Boudikova	Czech Republic	2:19:05 h
2013	Bruno Debertolis	Italy	1:47:12 h	Eugenia Bitchougova	Russia	2:21:28 h
2012	Sergio Bonaldi	Italy	1:47:15 h	Renate Forstner	Germany	2:21:24 h
2011	Bruno Debertolis	Italy	1:31:16 h	Ingrid Damgaard	Norway	1:47:40 h
2010	Bruno Debertolis	Italy	1:53:37 h	Eugenia Bitchougova	Russia	2:14:24 h

=== Winners classic 30 km ===
Year	Male	Female
2025	Tommaso Dellagiacoma Italy	Anna Schmidhofer Austria
2024	Tommaso Dellagiacoma Italy	Michaela Patscheider Italy
2023	Stefano Dellagiacoma Italy	Michaela Patscheider Italy
2022	Stefano Dellagiacoma Italy	Michaela Patscheider Italy
2021	canceled (COVID-19)	
2020	Florian Cappello Italy	Franziska Müller Germany
2019	Lorenzo Busin Italy	Chiara Caminada Italy
2018	Riccardo Mich Italy	Federica Simeoni Italy
2017	Christian Völz Germany	Franziska Müller Germany
2016	Miroslav Rypl Czech Republic	Jessica Müller Germany
2015	Eric Thomas Germany	Barbara Felderer Italy
2014	Andy Gerstenberger Germany	Alexandra Svoboda Germany
2013	Jens Filbrich Germany	Jessica Müller Germany
2012	Thomas Moriggl Italy	Barbara Felderer Italy
2011	Peter Milz Germany	Valentina Vuerich Italy
2010	Ivan Debertolis Italy	Barbara Antonelli Italy
2010	Thomas Steurer Austria	Eugenia Bitchougova Russia
2008	Marco Cattaneo Italy	Eugenia Bitchougova Russia
2007	Anders Aukland Norway	Alessandra Rigamonti Italy
