= Cross country and biathlon center Fabio Canal =

Skiing venue in Tesero, Italy

- Stadio del fondo di Lago di Tesero
- Lago di Tesero Cross Country Stadium
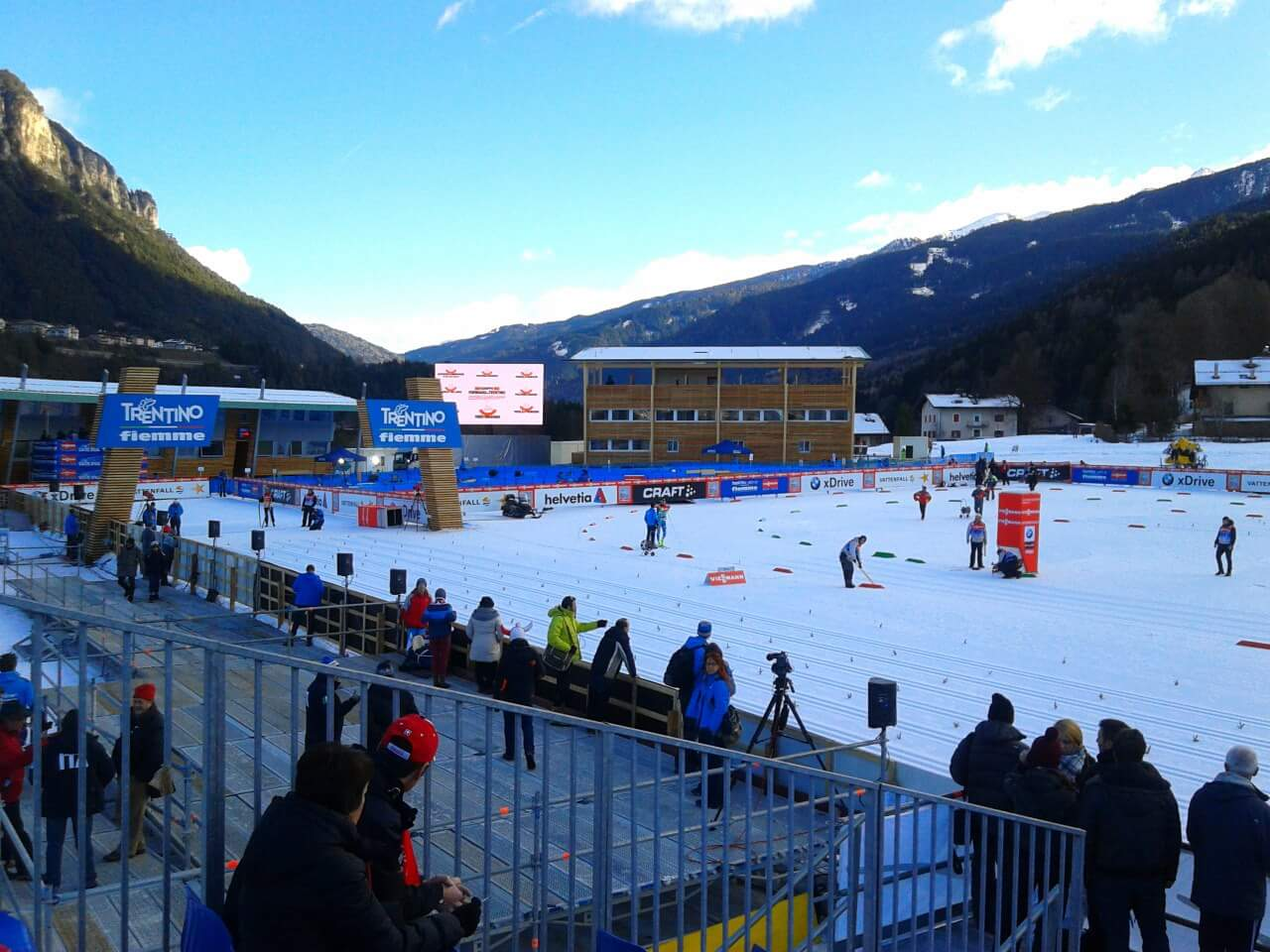
- Tour de Ski 2013 at Lago di Tesero Cross-country Ski Stadium
- Interactive map of Cross country and biathlon center Fabio Canal
- Address: Via della Stazione, 8 Tesero (Trento)
- Coordinates: 46°16′52″N 11°31′23″E
- Owner: Municipality of Tesero
- Operator: ITAP spa
- Capacity: 50,000
- Type: stadium
- Event: sporting events
- Surface: snow
- Scoreboard: yes
- Public transit: Lago, Trentino Trasporti

Construction
- Built: 1988-1990
- Renovated: 2010-2012

The Cross country and biathlon center Fabio Canàl (in italian: Centro del fondo e del biathlon Fabio Canal), until December 2018 named Lago di Tésero Cross Country Stadium (in italian: Stadio del fondo di Lago di Tesero) is a sport venue located in the village of Lago, in the municipality of Tésero (Fiemme Valley), in Trentino, northern Italy. It hosted cross-country skiing and Nordic combined for the 2026 Winter Olympics and Paralympics.

== History ==
The project to create a cross-country ski center was born in the mid-1980s, when the Val di Fiemme was a candidate to host the FIS Nordic World Ski Championships. At the 1988 Istanbul convention the FIS International Committee decided to set the FIS Nordic World Ski Championships 1991 at Val di Fiemme. The area of Lago di Tésero was chosen since it is located in the center of the Fiemme Valley, easily accessible (a new road in the bottom of the valley was realized on the occasion of the 1991 World Championship) and easily snowproof in case of adverse weather conditions and lack of natural snow (the stadium is located near the left bank of the river Avisio, from which they can take the necessary water for the artificial snow). The construction of the new sports facility cost 3.8 billion ITL and was financed entirely by the Autonomous Province of Trento.

After the success of Nordic World Ski Championships 1991, FIS assigned to Fiemme valley the Nordic World Ski Championships 2003. From 1993 to 2016, the center hosted the Trofeo Topolino cross-country skiing trophy (Mikey Mouse Trophy), later renamed as the Skiri Trophy XCross.

After the success of both the 1991 and 2003, the stadium was renovated between 2010 and 2012, in order to host again the World Ski Championship in 2013. Among the numerous renovations were the construction of a new building to house the commentary booths for journalists and a 2,000 m² warehouse, and the extension of the press room building. In addition, a shooting range was built for the 2013 Winter Universiade, when the venue hosted the biathlon events. The pistes were widened (to a minimum of 9 metres), and a climb was built after the start, as well as walkways and tunnels for spectators.

On 23 December 2018, the cross-country stadium was named in memory of Fabio Canal (1958-2008), historic sports director who founded the Winterthur Land Service Team and first president of the Lago di Tesero sports centre from 1995 until his death. In the same ceremony, the meeting room was named after Mario Morandini (Panet), while the press room was dedicated to journalist Lorenzo Lucianer, editor-in-chief of the TGR of Trento's RAI, who followed all the most important sporting events organised in Val di Fiemme.

== Features ==
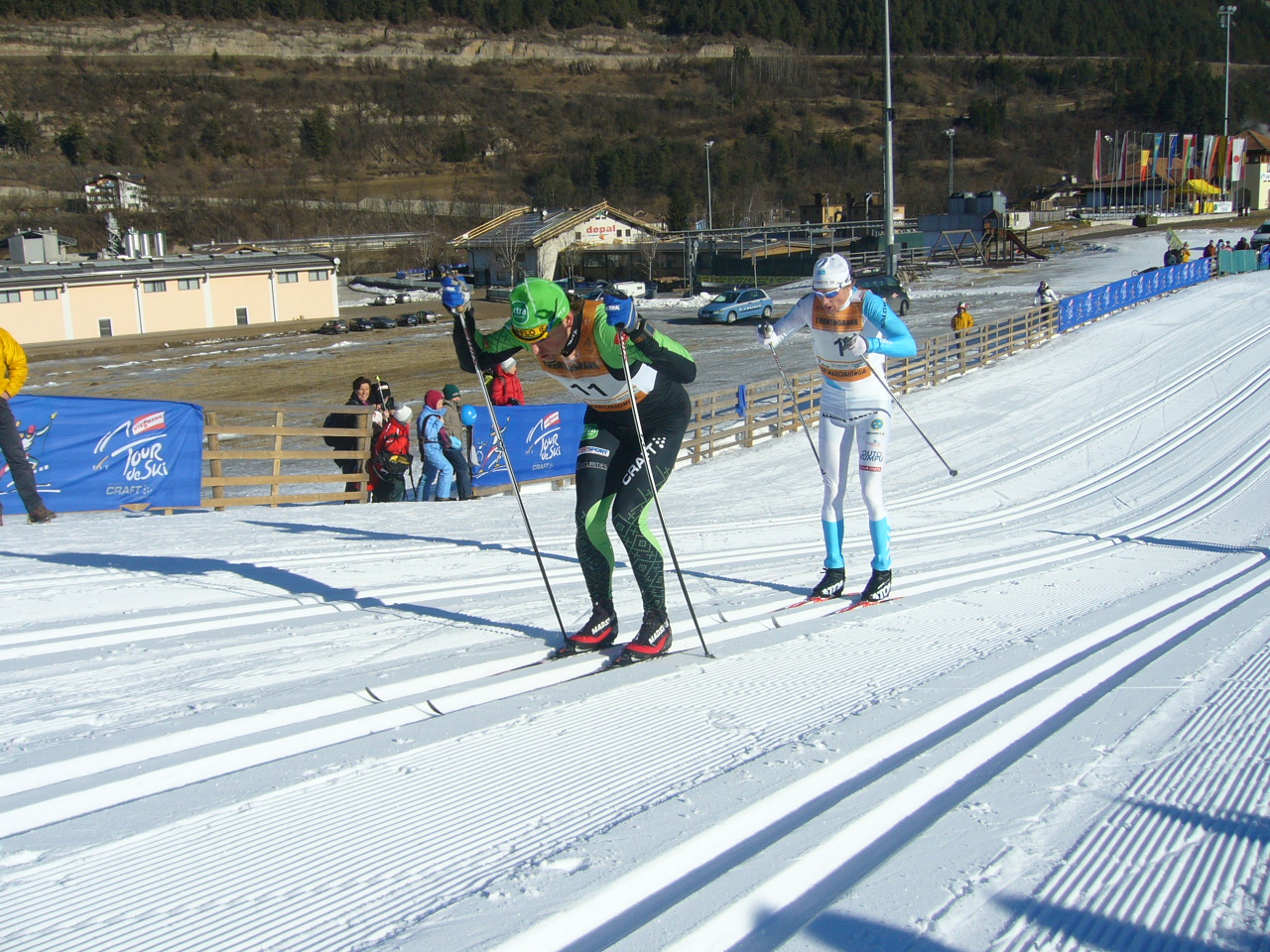
Marcialonga 2011: Jerry Ahrlin followed by Oskar Svärd passing through the Lago di Tesero Cross Country Stadium

The cross country stadium regularly hosts cross-country ski events. The ski center is open between December and mid March and, thanks to the lighting system, it is possible to ski also in the evening until 9 p.m. In case of snow lack, it's possible to ski at Lavazè Pass cross country center at the altitude of 1,850 metres (6,070 ft) MSL.

The venue hosted the cross-country ski events of three editions of FIS Nordic World Ski Championships (1991, 2003, and 2013), the 2013 Winter Universiade, and many events of the FIS Cross-Country World Cup. Every year hosts the Mickey Mouse Trophy of Cross-country ski (Trofeo Topolino di sci di fondo), and the Marcialonga passes through.

The buildings are all lined with Val di Fiemme wood and equipped with ISO 14001 environmental certification. The cost of stadium construction was funded at 95% by the Autonomous Province of Trento and the remaining 5% by the municipality of Tésero.

The cross-country stadium maximum capacity is about 50,000 spectators.

== Tracks ==
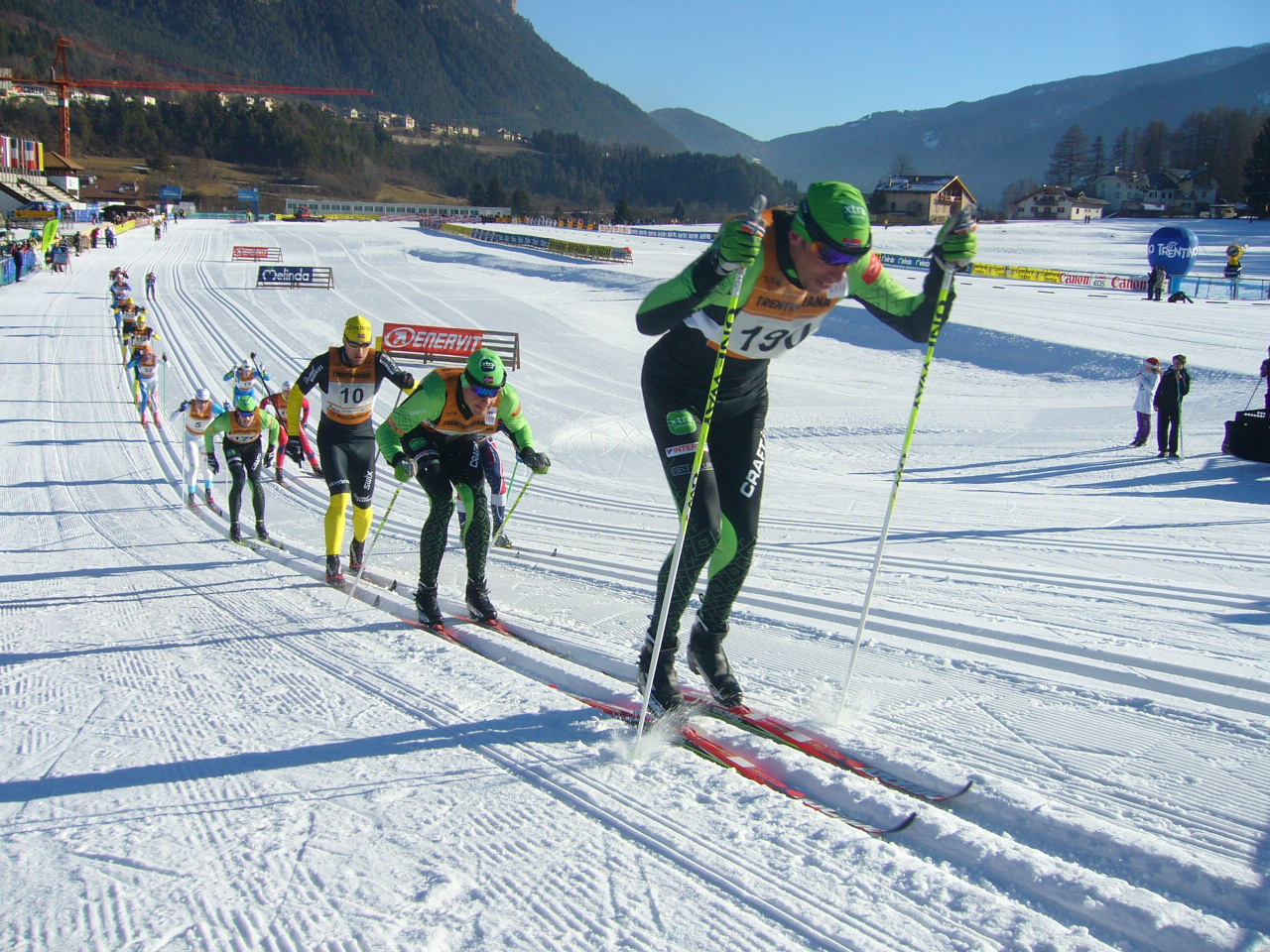
Skiers passing through the stadium during Marcialonga 2011

The venue, located at the altitude of 850 metres (2,790 ft) mean sea level, opens in winter season. There are 19 km of tracks, mostly with guaranteed artificial snow, from December to February, and it is linked with the Marcialonga track.

The 3 km ring track is lit at night.

== Facilities ==
Inside the venue, there is a ski school, a ski rental, an ice rink, and a restaurant.

In the immediate vicinity of the stadium, there is also a homologated sphaeristerium for tamburello matches.

== Major events hosted ==
- Winter Olympics: 2026 (cross-country skiing)
- Winter Paralympics: 2026 (biathlon and cross-country skiing)
- FIS Nordic World Ski Championships: 1991, 2003, 2013 (Nordic combined and cross-country skiing)
- Winter Universiade: 2013 (biathlon and cross-country skiing)
- Tour de Ski: from 2007
- Italian cross-country skiing championships: 1998, 2004, 2012
- Mickey Mouse Trophy: from 1993 to 2016
- Skiri Trophy XCross: from 2017

== See also ==
- Marcialonga
- "Giuseppe Dal Ben" Ski Jumping Stadium, Predazzo
