= Tesero =

- Comune
- Comune di Tesero
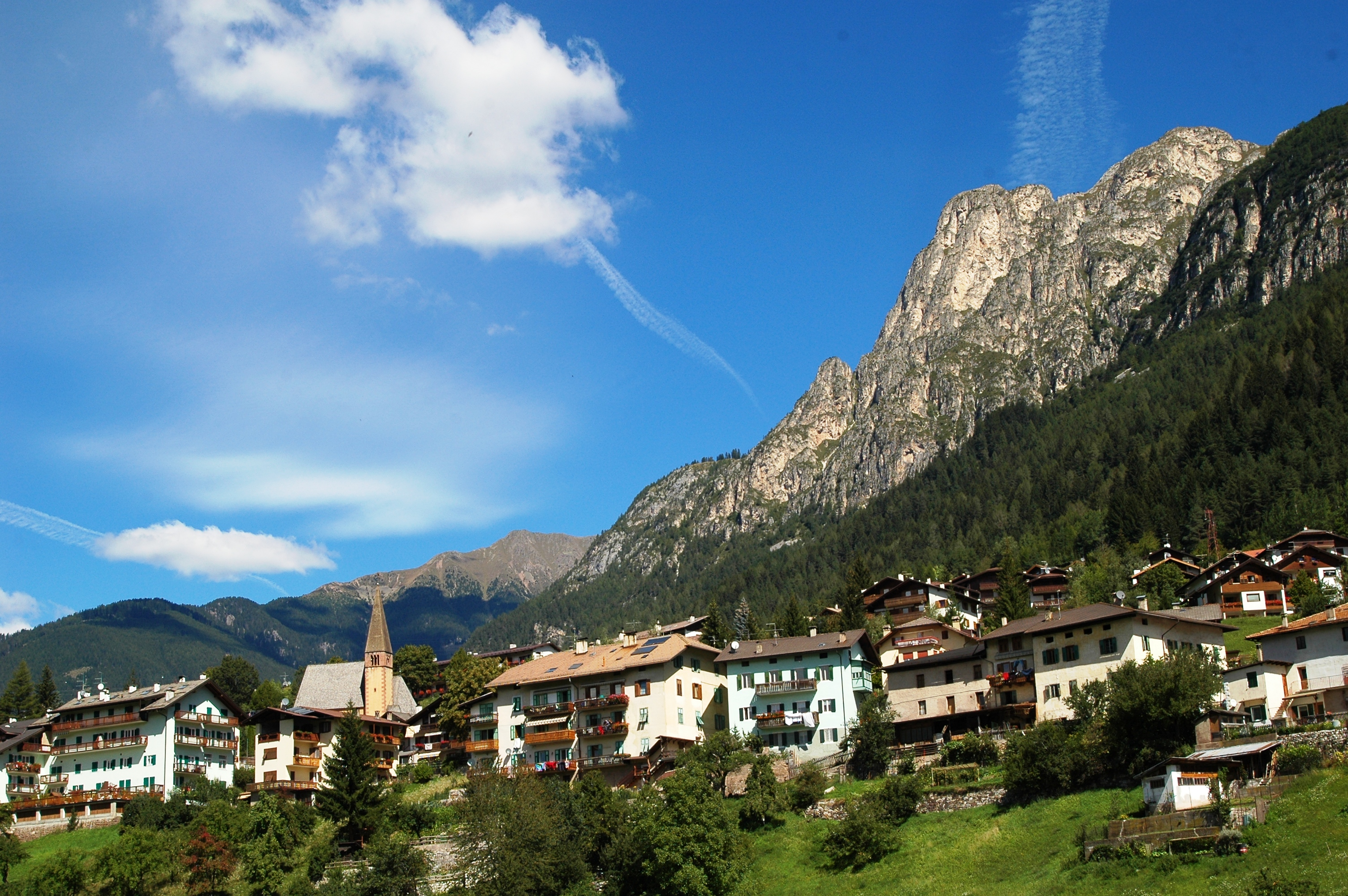

- Location within Italy Location within Trentino-Alto Adige/Südtirol
- Coordinates: 46°17′N 11°31′E
- Country: Italy
- Region: Trentino-Alto Adige/Südtirol
- Province: Trentino (TN)
- Frazioni: Lago, Stava, Alpe di Pampeago

Government
  - Mayor: Massimiliano Deflorian

Area
  - Total: 50.55 km^{2} (19.52 sq mi)
- Elevation: 1,000 m (3,300 ft)

Population (31 October 2021)
  - Total: 2,934
  - Density: 58.04/km^{2} (150.3/sq mi)
- Demonym: Teserani
- Time zone: UTC+1 (CET)
  - Summer (DST): UTC+2 (CEST)
- Postal code: 38038
- Dialing code: 0462
- Patron saint: Elisha
- Saint day: 14 June
- Website: Official website

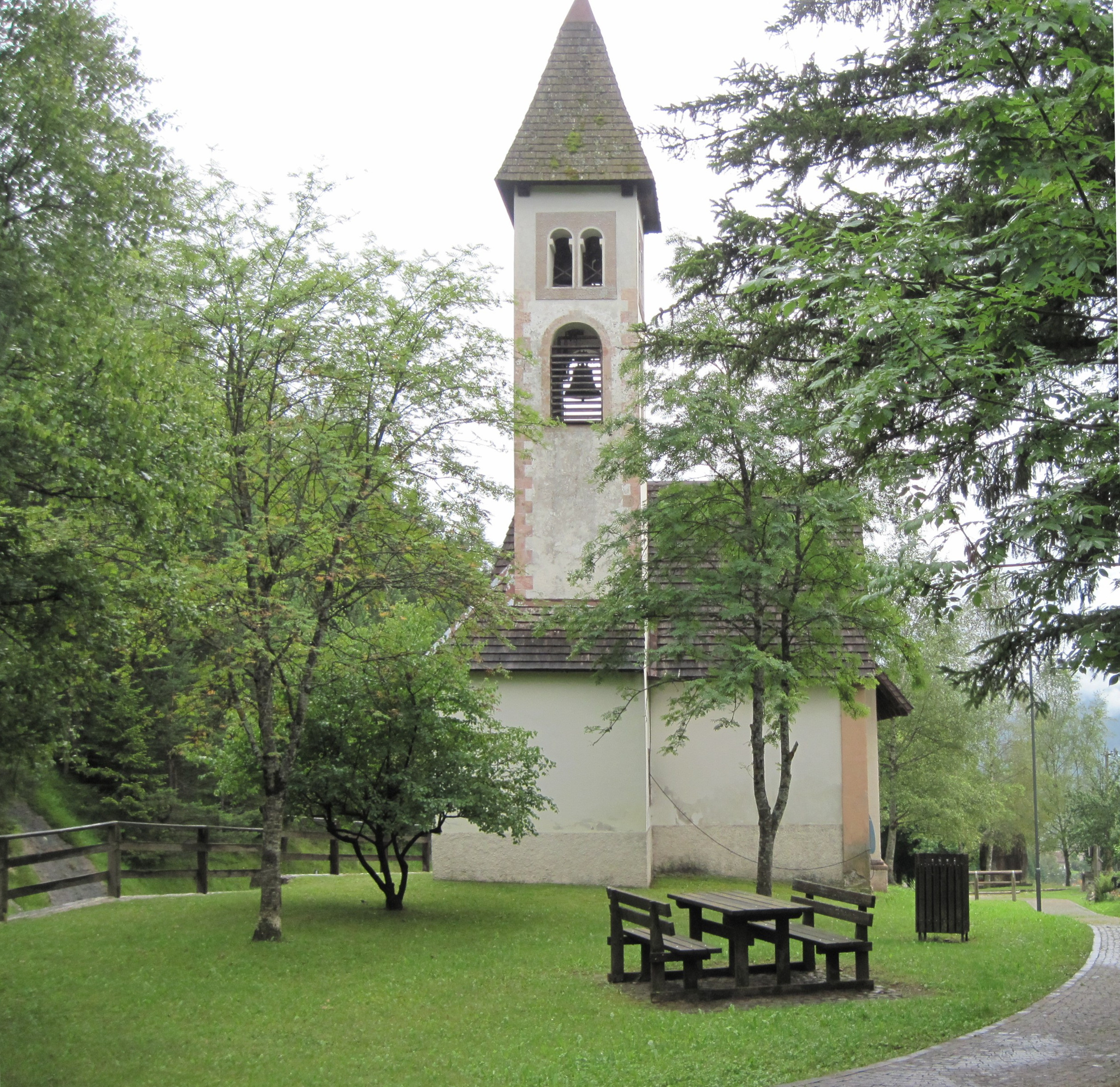
Addolorata Church

Tésero (Tiézer in local dialect) is a comune (municipality) in Trentino in the northern Italian region Trentino-Alto Adige/Südtirol, located in the Val di Fiemme about 40 kilometres (25 mi) northeast of Trento.

The municipality of Tesero contains the frazioni (subdivisions, mainly villages and hamlets) Lago, Stava and Alpe di Pampeago.

Tesero borders the following municipalities: Deutschnofen, Predazzo, Panchià, Cavalese, Pieve Tesino and Ville di Fiemme.

The 1985 Val di Stava dam collapse killed 268 people in Tesero.

== Sport ==
=== Cross country ski ===
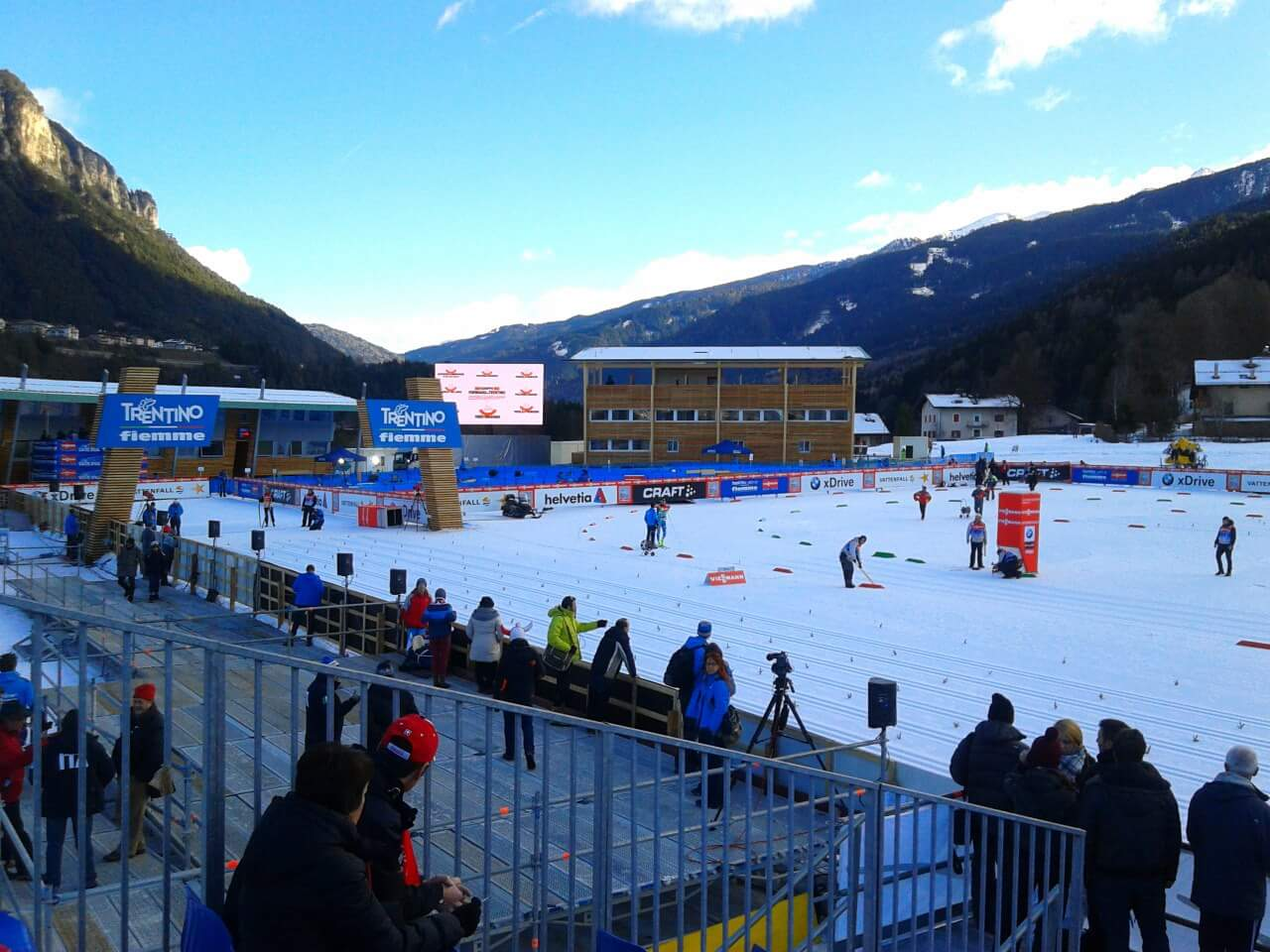
Tour de Ski 2013 at Lago di Tesero Cross Country Stadium

In the village of Lago, the Lago di Tesero Cross Country Stadium hosts winter events (cross-country ski, biathlon, ice rink games). The stadium was a sport venue of three editions of FIS Nordic World Ski Championships (1991, 2003, and 2013), 2013 Winter Universiade, and many events of the FIS Cross-Country World Cup. This venue will host the cross-country skiing and Nordic combined events during the 2026 Winter Olympics. Every year it hosts the Mickey Mouse Trophy of Cross-country ski (Trofeo Topolino di sci di fondo), and the Marcialonga passes through.

Other cross-country ski tracks are located in Pampeago and Lavazè Pass.

=== Alpine ski ===
Ski Center Latemar at Pampeago offers 48 kilometres (30 mi) of slopes.

=== Cycling ===
The Giro d'Italia ended five stages at Pampeago Pass in 1998, 1999, 2003, 2008, and 2012.

== See also ==
- Lago di Tesero Cross Country Stadium
