= Jerry Ahrlin =

Swedish cross-country skier

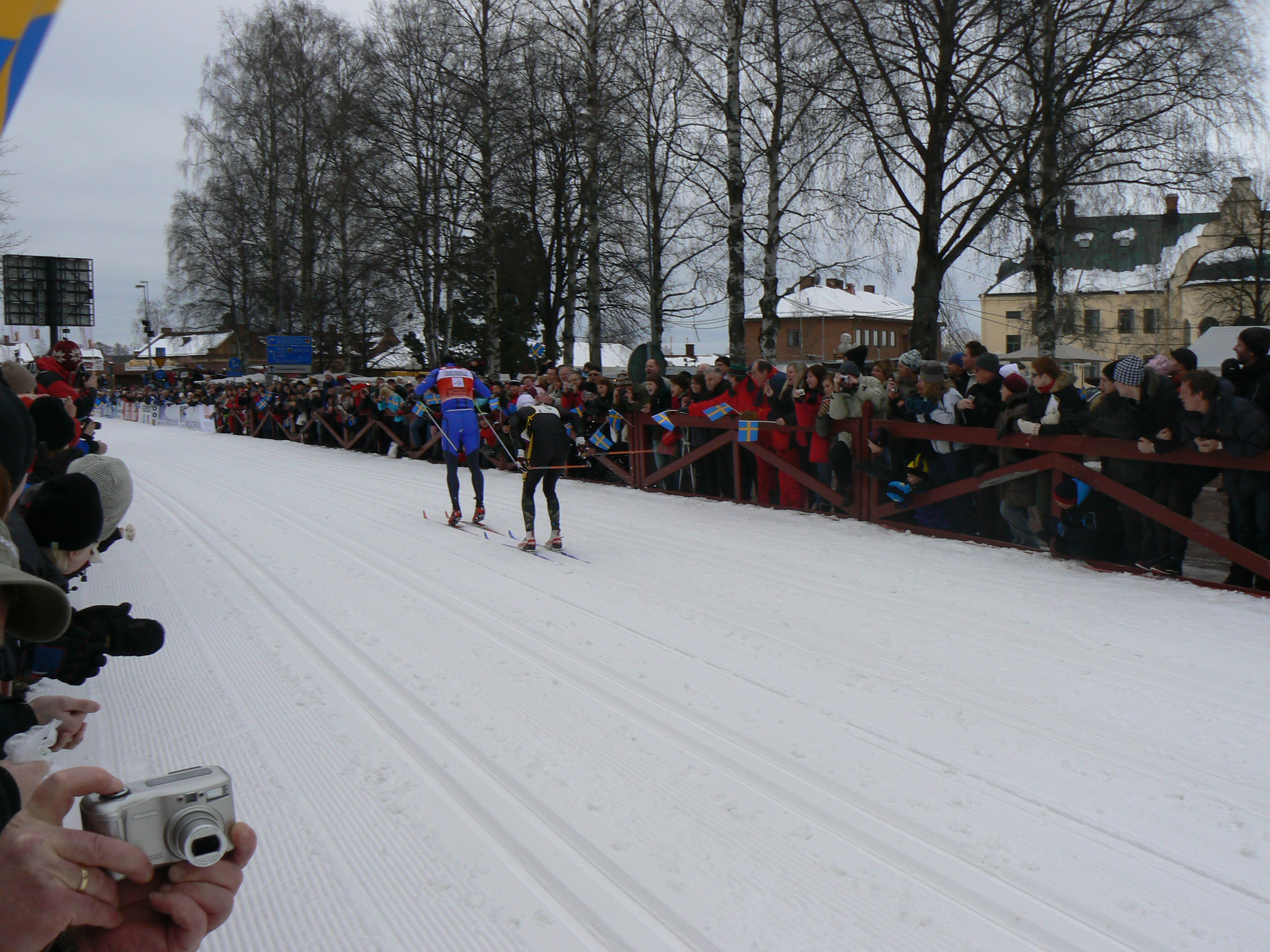
- The 2007 Vasaloppet, Oskar Svärd (in black) is still behind Jerry Ahrlin (in blue), when a few hundreds of meters remain.

Personal information
- Nationality: Sweden
- Born: 15 January 1978 (age 48) Östersund, Sweden

Sport
- Sport: Skiing
- Club: Brunflo IF

World Cup career
- Seasons: 7 – (2000, 2002–2006, 2008)
- Indiv. starts: 12
- Indiv. podiums: 1
- Indiv. wins: 0
- Team starts: 3
- Team podiums: 0
- Overall titles: 0 – (66th in 2006)
- Discipline titles: 0

Jerry Ahrlin (born 15 January 1978 in Östersund, Sweden), is a Swedish cross-country skier.

== Cross-country skiing results ==
All results are sourced from the International Ski Federation (FIS).

=== World Cup ===
==== Season standings ====
Season	Age	Discipline standings					Ski Tour standings	
Season	Age	Overall	Distance	Long Distance	Middle Distance	Sprint	Tour de Ski	World Cup Final
2000	22	NC	—N/a	—	—	NC	—N/a	—N/a
2002	24	128	—N/a	—N/a	—N/a	70	—N/a	—N/a
2003	25	NC	—N/a	—N/a	—N/a	NC	—N/a	—N/a
2004	26	115	NC	—N/a	—N/a	58	—N/a	—N/a
2005	27	NC	—	—N/a	—N/a	NC	—N/a	—N/a
2006	28	66	43	—N/a	—N/a	—	—N/a	—N/a
2008	30	NC	NC	—N/a	—N/a	—	DNF	—

==== Individual podiums ====
- 1 podium – (1 WC)

No.	Season	Date	Location	Race	Level	Place
1	2005–06	5 March 2006	Vasaloppet, Sweden	90 km Mass Start C	World Cup	2nd

== Trophies ==
- Marcialonga winner of 2007, 2009 and 2011
- Tartu Maraton winner of 2007 and 2011
- König Ludwig Lauf winner of 2013
