= Jørgen Aukland =

Norwegian cross-country skier

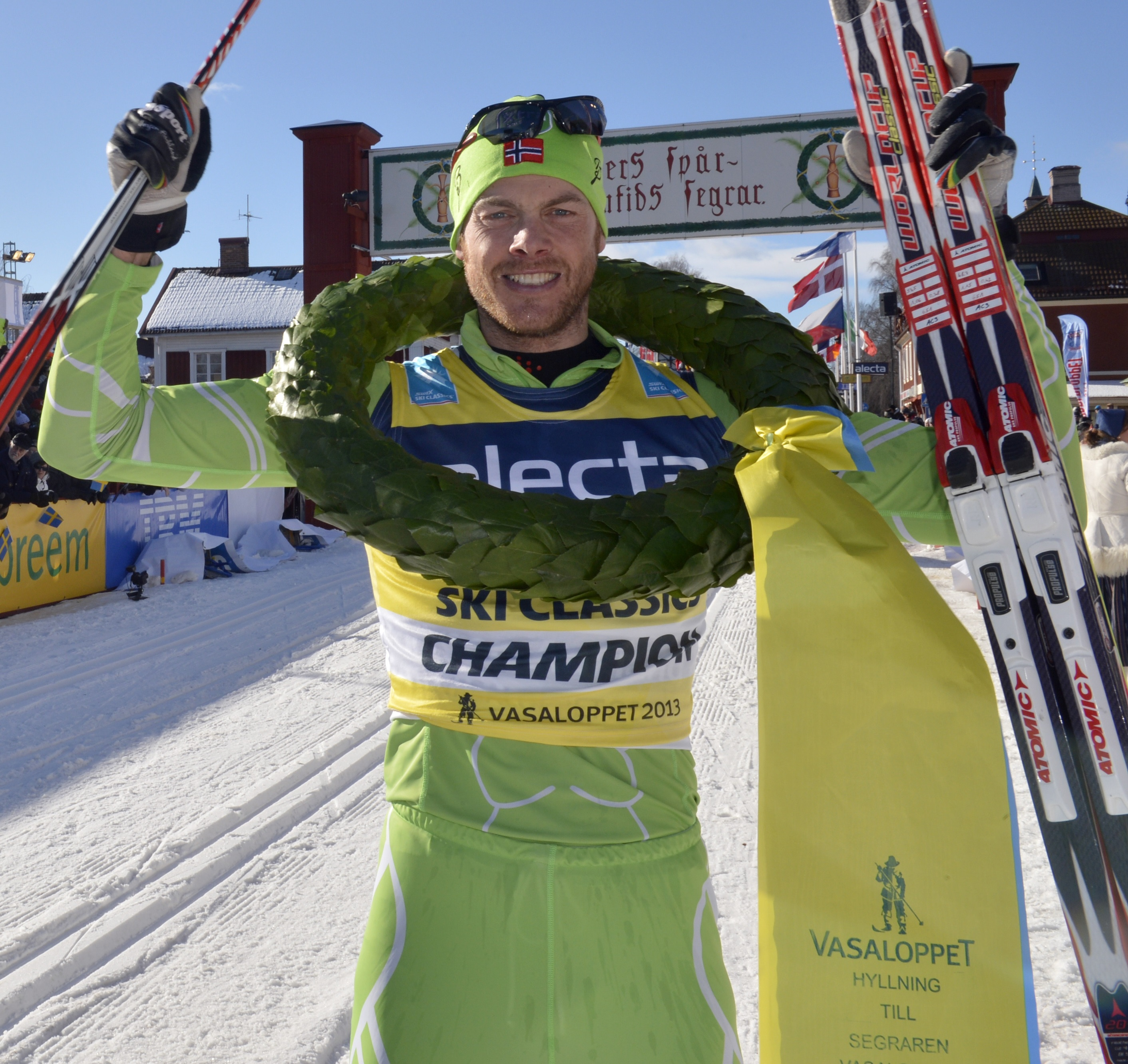
- Aukland wins Vasaloppet 2013

Personal information
- Nationality: Norway
- Born: 6 August 1975 (age 50) Tønsberg, Norway

Sport
- Sport: Skiing
- Club: Oseberg SL

World Cup career
- Seasons: 5 – (2001–2002, 2004, 2006)
- Indiv. starts: 4
- Indiv. podiums: 1
- Indiv. wins: 0
- Team starts: 0
- Overall titles: 0 – (67th in 2004)
- Discipline titles: 0

Jørgen Aukland (born 6 August 1975) is a Norwegian retired long-distance cross-country skier. He is the brother of Anders Aukland and Fredrik Aukland.

Aukland went to college at the Norwegian School of Sport Sciences.

In 2008, he won Vasaloppet.

On 9 April 2016, it was announced that he was going to retire following Nordenskiöldsloppet in Sweden the next day.

== Cross-country skiing results ==
All results are sourced from the International Ski Federation (FIS).

=== World Cup ===
==== Season standings ====
Season	Age			
Season	Age	Overall	Distance	Sprint
2001	25	NC	—N/a	NC
2002	26	121	—N/a	—
2004	28	67	44	—
2006	30	105	71	—

==== Individual podiums ====
- 1 podium (1 WC)

No.	Season	Date	Location	Race	Level	Place
1	2003–04	24 January 2004	Marcialonga, Italy	70 km Mass Start C	World Cup	3rd

== Sports merits ==
- 2002 Vasaloppet – 2nd
- 2003 Vasaloppet – 2nd
- 2003 FIS Marathon Cup – Winner
- 2003 Marcialonga – Winner
- 2004 Vasaloppet – 3rd
- 2005 Vasaloppet – 3rd
- 2006 Marcialonga – Winner
- 2007 Vasaloppet – 3rd
- 2008 Vasaloppet – Winner
- 2012 Marcialonga – Winner
- 2013 Marcialonga – Winner
- 2013 Vasaloppet – Winner
