= Panchià =

- Comune
- Comune di Panchià
- Location within Italy Location within Trentino-Alto Adige/Südtirol
- Coordinates: 46°17′N 11°33′E
- Country: Italy
- Region: Trentino-Alto Adige/Südtirol
- Province: Trentino (TN)

Government
  - Mayor: Gianfranco Varesco

Area
  - Total: 20.2 km^{2} (7.8 sq mi)
- Elevation: 981 m (3,219 ft)

Population (30 November 2016)
  - Total: 827
  - Density: 40.9/km^{2} (106/sq mi)
- Demonym: Panciai
- Time zone: UTC+1 (CET)
  - Summer (DST): UTC+2 (CEST)
- Postal code: 38030
- Dialing code: 0462
- Website: Official website

Panchià (Pancià in local dialect) is a comune (municipality) in Trentino in the northern Italian region Trentino-Alto Adige/Südtirol, located about 40 kilometres (25 mi) northeast of Trento.

Panchià borders the following municipalities: Predazzo, Tesero, Ziano di Fiemme and Pieve Tesino.

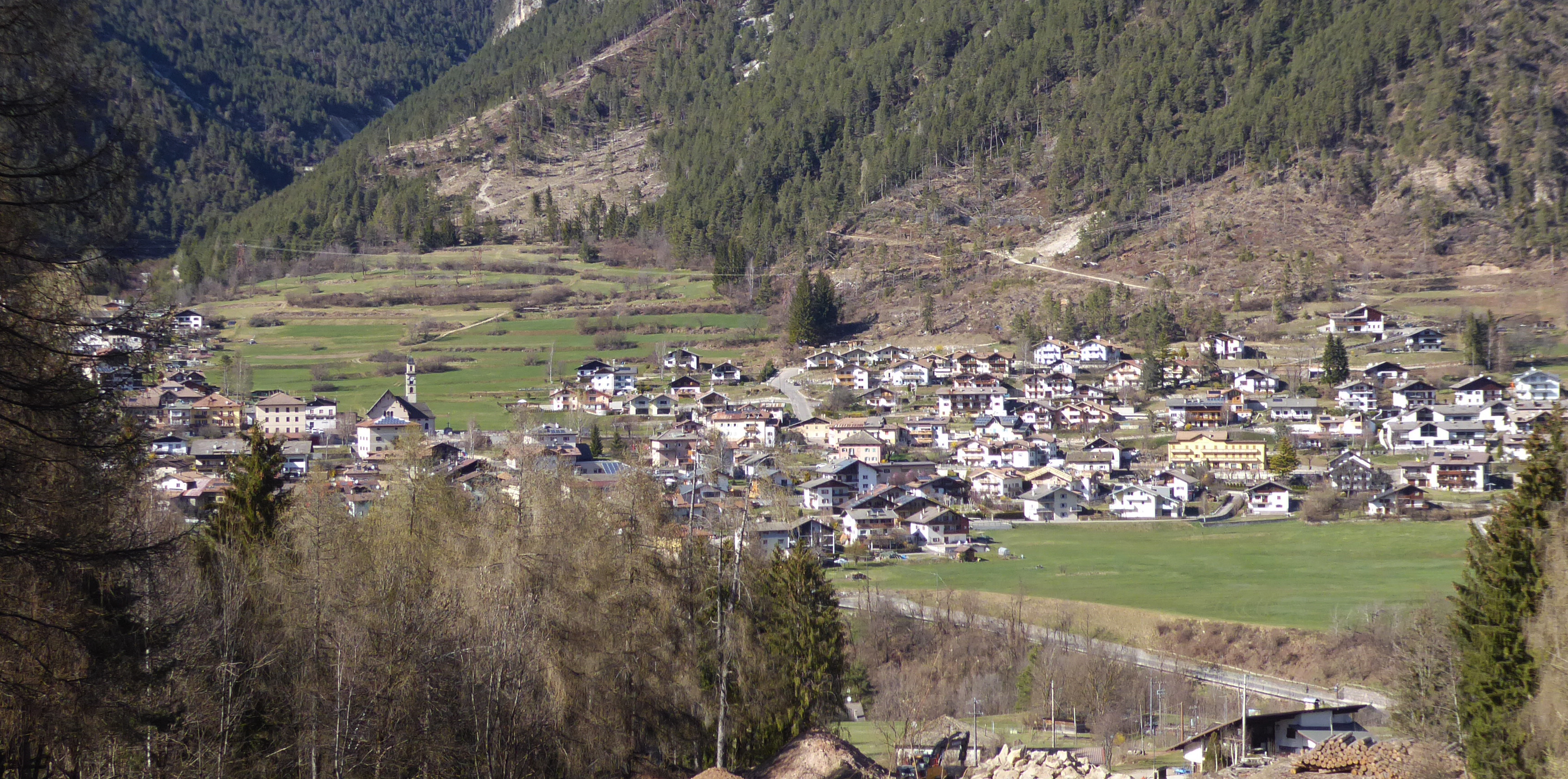
View of Panchià
