= Emilie Fleten =

Norwegian cross-country skier (born 1992)

Personal information
- Born: 9 June 1992 (age 33) Gol, Norway

Sport
- Sport: Cross-country skiing
- Club: Gol IL

Emilie Fleten (born 9 June 1992) is a Norwegian cross-country skier who represents the club Gol IL.

Her achievements include victories in Vasaloppet in 2023, 2024 and 2026.

In January 2024 she won the women's class of Marcialonga 2024 and again in 2025. By winning the ski race Janteloppet in April 2024, she thus won the overall 2023/24 season of Ski Classics.
