= Gsies =

Gsies Italian: Valle di Casies
- Comune
- Gemeinde Gsies; Comune di Valle di Casies
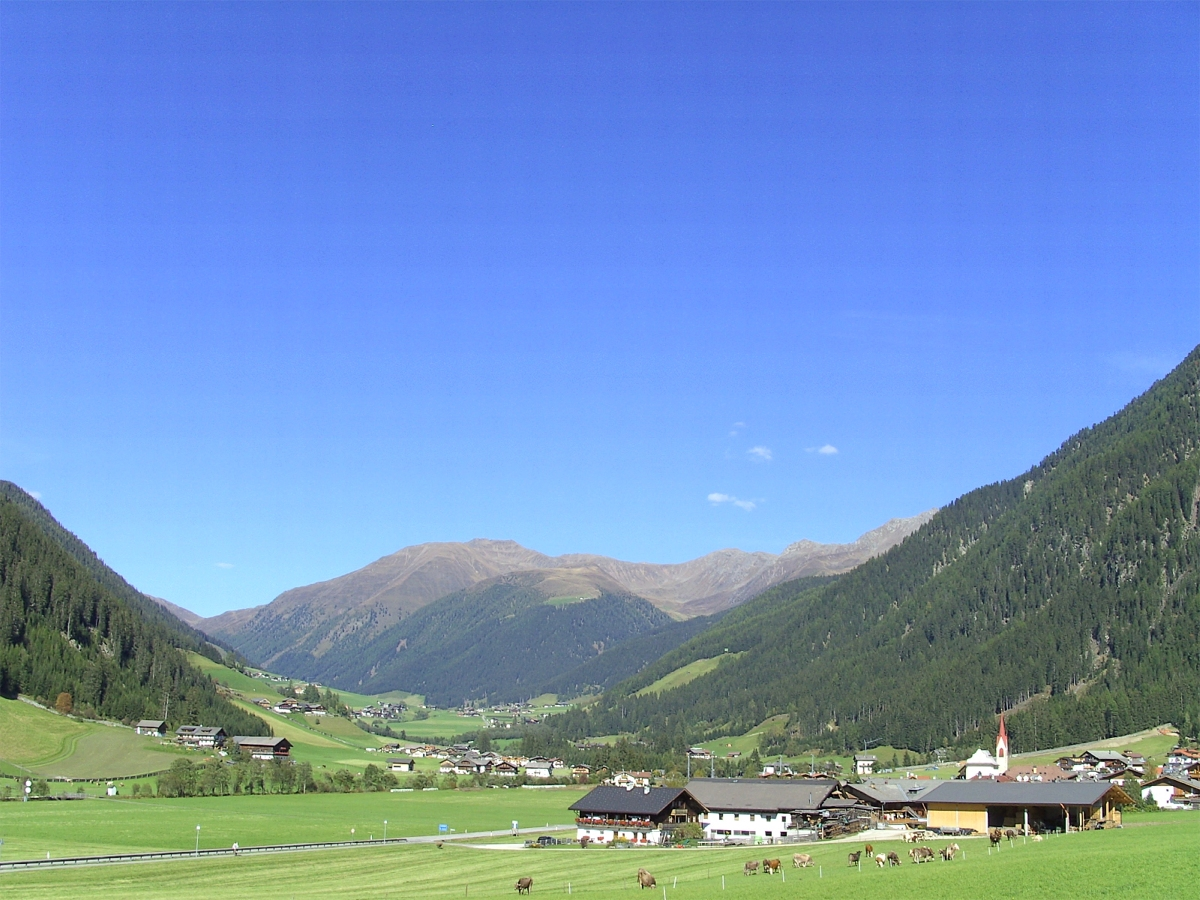
- Gsies Valley

- Location within Italy Location within Trentino-Alto Adige/Südtirol
- Coordinates: 46°46′N 12°11′E
- Country: Italy
- Region: Trentino-Alto Adige/Südtirol
- Province: South Tyrol (BZ)
- Frazioni: Außerpichl (Colle di Fuori), Innerpichl (Colle di Dentro), St Magdalena-Niedertal (Santa Maddalena Valbassa), St Magdalena-Obertal (Santa Maddalena Vallalta), St Martin-Niedertal (San Martino Valbassa), St Martin-Obertal (San Martino Vallalta), Oberplanken (Planca di Sopra), Unterplanken (Planca di Sotto)

Government
  - Mayor: Paul Schwingshackl

Area
  - Total: 108.7 km^{2} (42.0 sq mi)

Population (Nov. 2010)
  - Total: 2,256
  - Density: 20.75/km^{2} (53.75/sq mi)
- Demonym(s): German: Gsieser; Italian: di Casies
- Time zone: UTC+1 (CET)
  - Summer (DST): UTC+2 (CEST)
- Postal code: 39035
- Dialing code: 0474
- Website: Official website

Gsies (German: [ˈɡsiːəs]; Italian: Valle di Casies [ˈvalle di kaˈziːes]) is a valley and comune (municipality) in South Tyrol in northern Italy, located about 70 kilometres (43 mi) northeast of Bolzano, on the border with Austria. Gsies held the FIL World Luge Natural Track Championships 1994.

== Geography ==
As of 30 November 2010, it had a population of 2,256 and an area of 108.7 square kilometres (42.0 mi^{2}).

Gsies borders the following municipalities: Toblach, Innervillgraten (Austria), Welsberg-Taisten, Rasen-Antholz, Sankt Jakob in Defereggen (Austria), and Niederdorf.

=== Frazioni ===
The municipality of Gsies contains the frazioni (subdivisions, mainly villages and hamlets) Außerpichl (Colle di Fuori), Innerpichl (Colle di Dentro), St Magdalena-Niedertal (Santa Maddalena Valbassa), St Magdalena-Obertal (Santa Maddalena Vallalta), St Martin-Niedertal (San Martino Valbassa), St Martin-Obertal (San Martino Vallalta), Oberplanken (Planca di Sopra) and Unterplanken (Planca di Sotto).

== History ==
=== Coat-of-arms ===
The emblem represents two sable scrapers placed per fess on or. It is the arms of the Knights of Gsies known from 13th century and extinct in 1429. The emblem was granted in 1968.

== Society ==
=== Linguistic distribution ===
According to the 2024 census, 98.11% of the population speak German, 1.80% Italian and 0.09% Ladin as first language.

=== Demographic evolution ===
Historical population

Year	Pop.	±%
1861	?	—
1871	?	—
1881	?	—
1901	?	—
1911	?	—

Year	Pop.	±%
1921	1,319	—
1931	1,360	+3.1%
1936	1,411	+3.8%
1951	1,561	+10.6%
1961	1,732	+11.0%

Year	Pop.	±%
1971	1,819	+5.0%
1981	1,932	+6.2%
1991	2,008	+3.9%
2001	2,098	+4.5%

Source: Data from ISTAT

== Sports ==
- Gsieser-Tal-Lauf, cross-country skiing race in the Gsiesertal in South Tyrol, Italy
