= Enrico Nizzi =

Italian cross-country skier

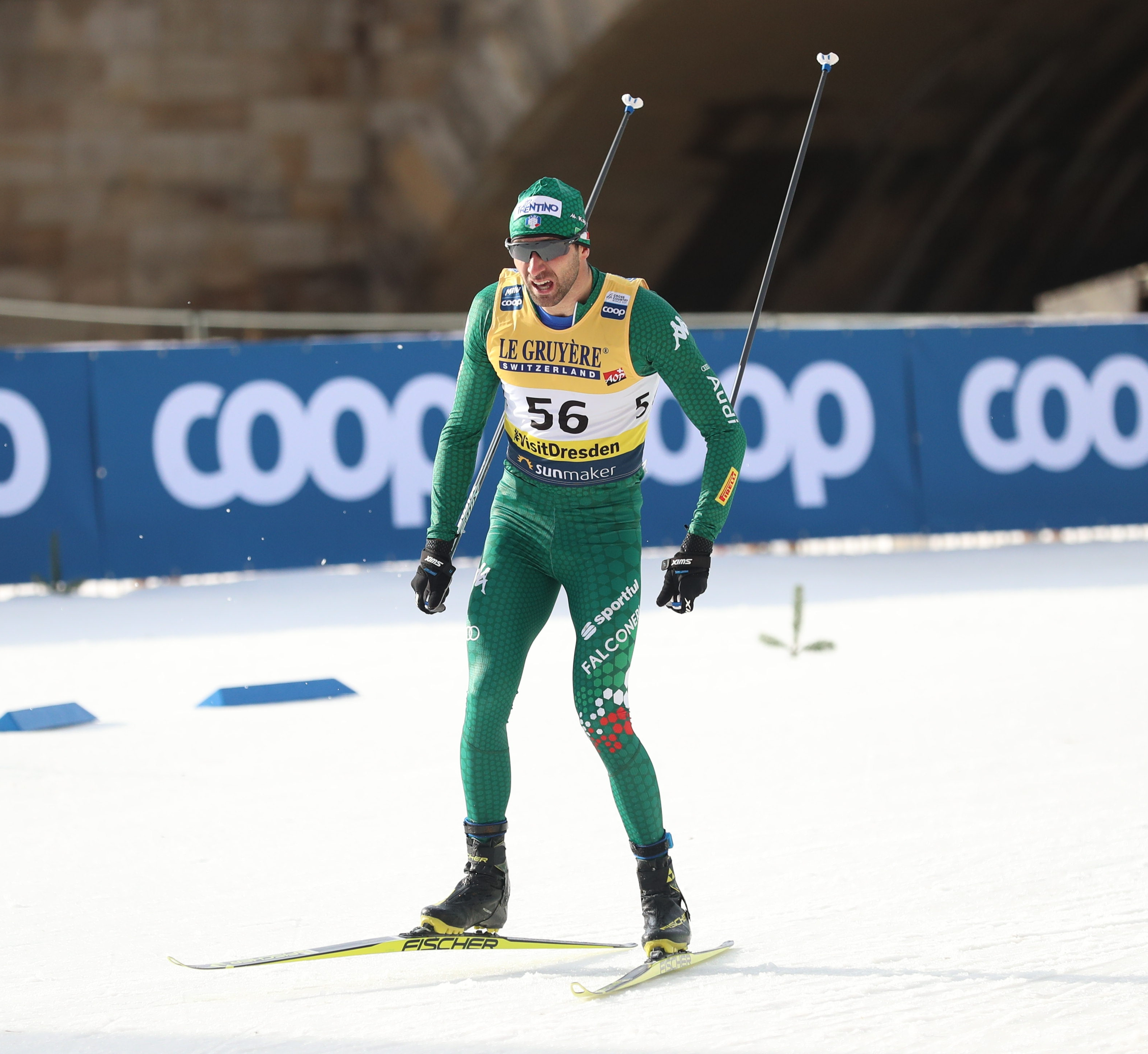
- Enrico Nizzi in January, 2019

Personal information
- Nationality: Italy
- Born: 1 August 1990 (age 36) Cavalese, Italy

Sport
- Sport: Skiing
- Club: C.S. Esercito

World Cup career
- Seasons: 7 – (2012, 2014–2019)
- Indiv. starts: 20
- Indiv. podiums: 0
- Team starts: 4
- Team podiums: 0
- Overall titles: 0 – (122nd in 2019)
- Discipline titles: 0
- Updated on 18 April 2019

Enrico Nizzi (born 1 August 1990 in Cavalese) is an Italian cross-country skier.

Nizzi competed at the 2014 Winter Olympics for Italy. He placed 44th in the qualifying round in the sprint, failing to advance to the knockout stages.

Nizzi made his World Cup debut in January 2012. As of April 2014, his best finish is a 13th, in a classical team sprint event at Asiago in 2013–14. His best individual finish is 25th, in a freestyle sprint race at Davos in 2013-14. His best World Cup overall finish is 147th, in 2013-14. His best World Cup finish in a discipline is 91st, in the 2013-14 sprint.

== Cross-country skiing results ==
All results are sourced from the International Ski Federation (FIS).

=== Olympic Games ===
Year	Age	15 km individual	30 km skiathlon	50 km mass start	Sprint	4 × 10 km relay	Team sprint
2018	27	—	—	—	44	—	—

=== World Cup ===
==== Season standings ====
Season	Age	Discipline standings			Ski Tour standings			
Season	Age	Overall	Distance	Sprint	Nordic Opening	Tour de Ski	World Cup Final	Ski Tour Canada
2012	21	NC	—	NC	—	—	—	—N/a
2014	23	NC	NC	NC	—	—	—	—N/a
2015	24	144	—	89	—	DNF	—N/a	—N/a
2016	25	NC	NC	NC	—	—	—N/a	—
2017	26	NC	—	NC	—	—	—	—N/a
2018	27	NC	—	NC	—	—	—	—N/a
2019	28	122	—	66	NC	DNF	—	—N/a
