= Predazzo =

- Comune
- Comune di Predazzo
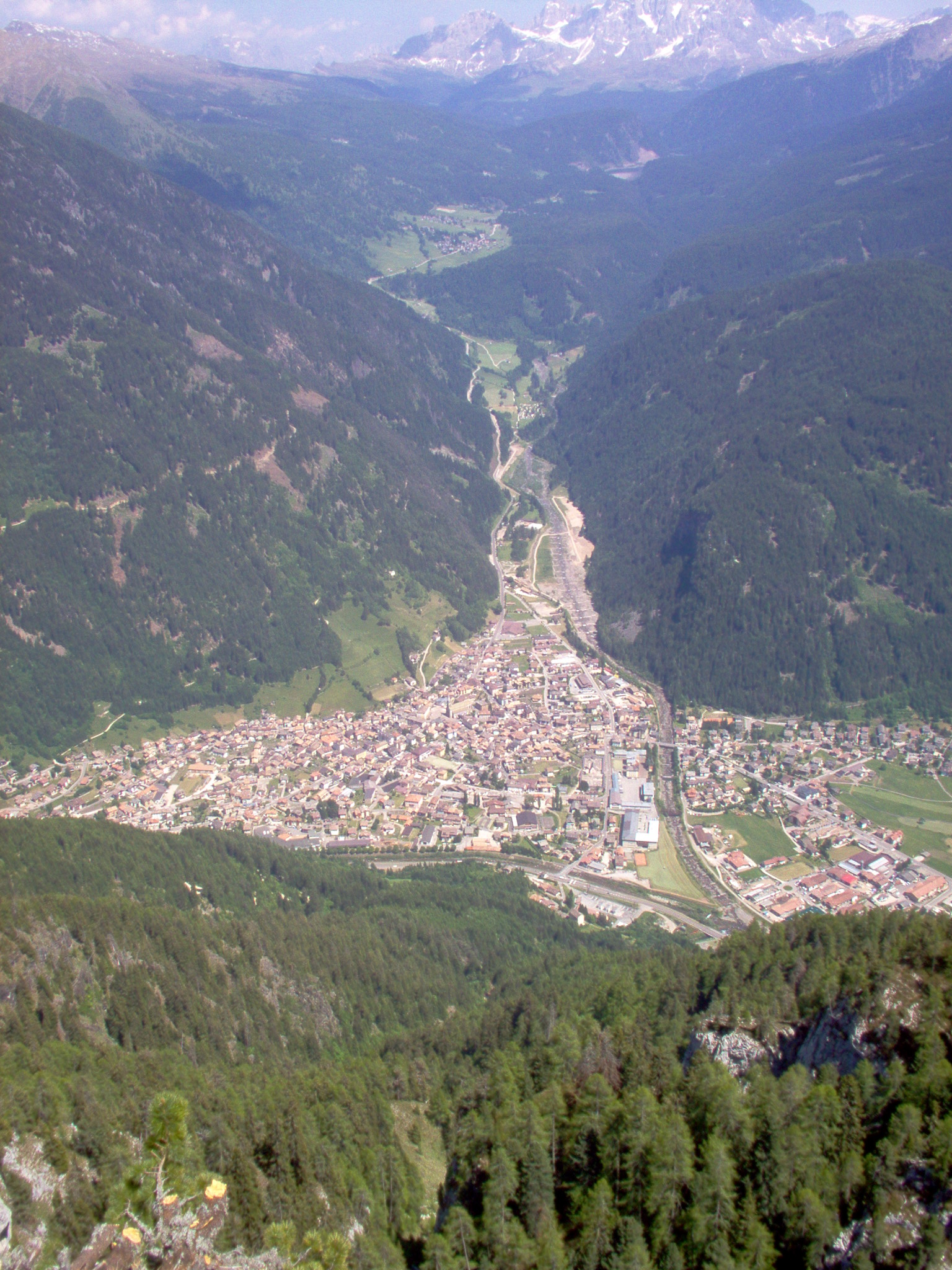

- Coat of arms

- Location within Italy Location within Trentino-Alto Adige/Südtirol
- Coordinates: 46°19′N 11°36′E
- Country: Italy
- Region: Trentino-Alto Adige/Südtirol
- Province: Trentino (TN)
- Frazioni: Bellamonte, Fòl, Mezzavalle, Paneveggio, Coste and Zaluna

Government
  - Mayor: Paolo Boninsegna

Area
  - Total: 109.9 km^{2} (42.4 sq mi)
- Elevation: 1,018 m (3,340 ft)

Population (2026)
  - Total: 4,510 (M 2,220 and F 2,290)
  - Density: 41.0/km^{2} (106/sq mi)
- Demonym: Predazzani
- Time zone: UTC+1 (CET)
  - Summer (DST): UTC+2 (CEST)
- Postal code: 38037
- Dialing code: 0462
- Patron saint: St. Philip and St. James
- Saint day: July 25
- Website: Official website

Predazzo (Italian pronunciation: [preˈdaːttso], lit. 'big meadow') is a village and comune in the province of Trento, northern Italy. Predazzo is located about 58 kilometres northeast of Trento in Val di Fiemme.

It is one of the main centers of Val di Fiemme (the other is Cavalese), being the most populous and widespread of the valley. It is an important road junction and trade between the valleys of Fiemme and Fassa and the area of Primiero.

== Geography ==
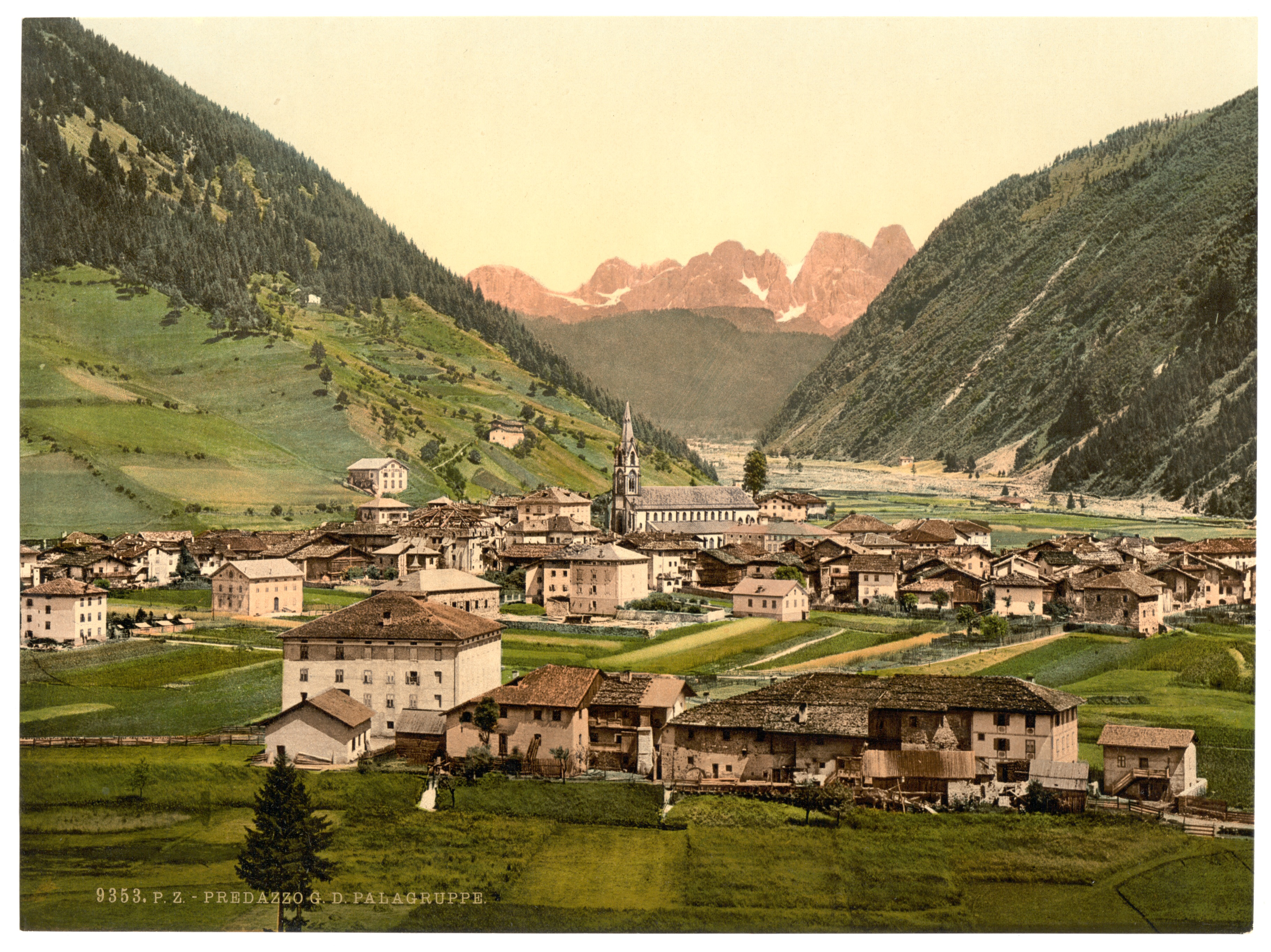
Predazzo between 1890 and 1900

=== Territory & climate ===
Predazzo borders with the following municipalities: Moena, Tesero, Panchià, Ziano di Fiemme, Primiero San Martino di Castrozza, Canal San Bovo, Nova Levante and Nova Ponente. Located at the confluence of the river Travignolo from the Dolomite Group of the Pale di San Martino, in the river Avisio, from the top of the Marmolada, it is the most upstream of the Val di Fiemme.

The territory of Predazzo is part of the Paneveggio-Pale di San Martino Natural Park, the Magnifica Comunità di Fiemme and Comprensorio della Valle di Fiemme (C1).

Minimum and maximum temperatures during the whole year reach −21 °C (−6 °F) and +38 °C (100 °F).

=== Morphology and geology ===
The characteristic morphology of Predazzo was originated around 200 million years ago, when a volcano collapsed. The territory then changed shape due to different atmospheric phenomena (e.g. erosion, glaciation). Predazzo is consequently located in the core of the Dolomites, between Lagorai, Latemar and Pale di San Martino mountain groups - which are part of the Dolomites recognised by UNESCO as World Heritage Site.

At the beginning of the 18th century, the Italian geologist Giuseppe Marzari Pencati noticed that granite, lava and marine sediment were altogether present in this area. The discovery of geology's value in the Dolomites attracted more and more scientists and researchers from all Europe, making Predazzo become an important destination for geology. Among the list of names: A. von Humboldt, F. von Richthofen, D. de Dolomieu, M.M. Gordon.

== Hamlets and places ==
Predazzo is divided in 8 neighborhoods and has 6 hamlets: Bellamonte, Paneveggio, Mezzavalle, Fol, Coste and Zaluna. Pè de Pardac (Piè di Predazzo) is the historic center and it is located between Sommavilla and Molin. Molin is located on the west part of Predazzo, at the foot of Pelenzana, and takes its name from the presence of mills and canals in the early twentieth century. Before the advent of the electric light, in fact, many manufacturers took advantage of the hydraulic force on the course of the water conveyed in canals.

Somaìla (Sommavilla), situated near the square, is considered part of the old town and marks the end of the valley Travignolo.

Poz is a very recently district, close to the municipal aqueduct north of Predazzo and at the foot of Mount Mulat. Adjacent at it there is Birreria that take the name because of the presence of a brewery (now closed) near the exit to the north of Predazzo. Borgonuovo appears to be the newest part of Predazzo. New houses built close to the horse racing and football fields. It is located south of Predazzo.

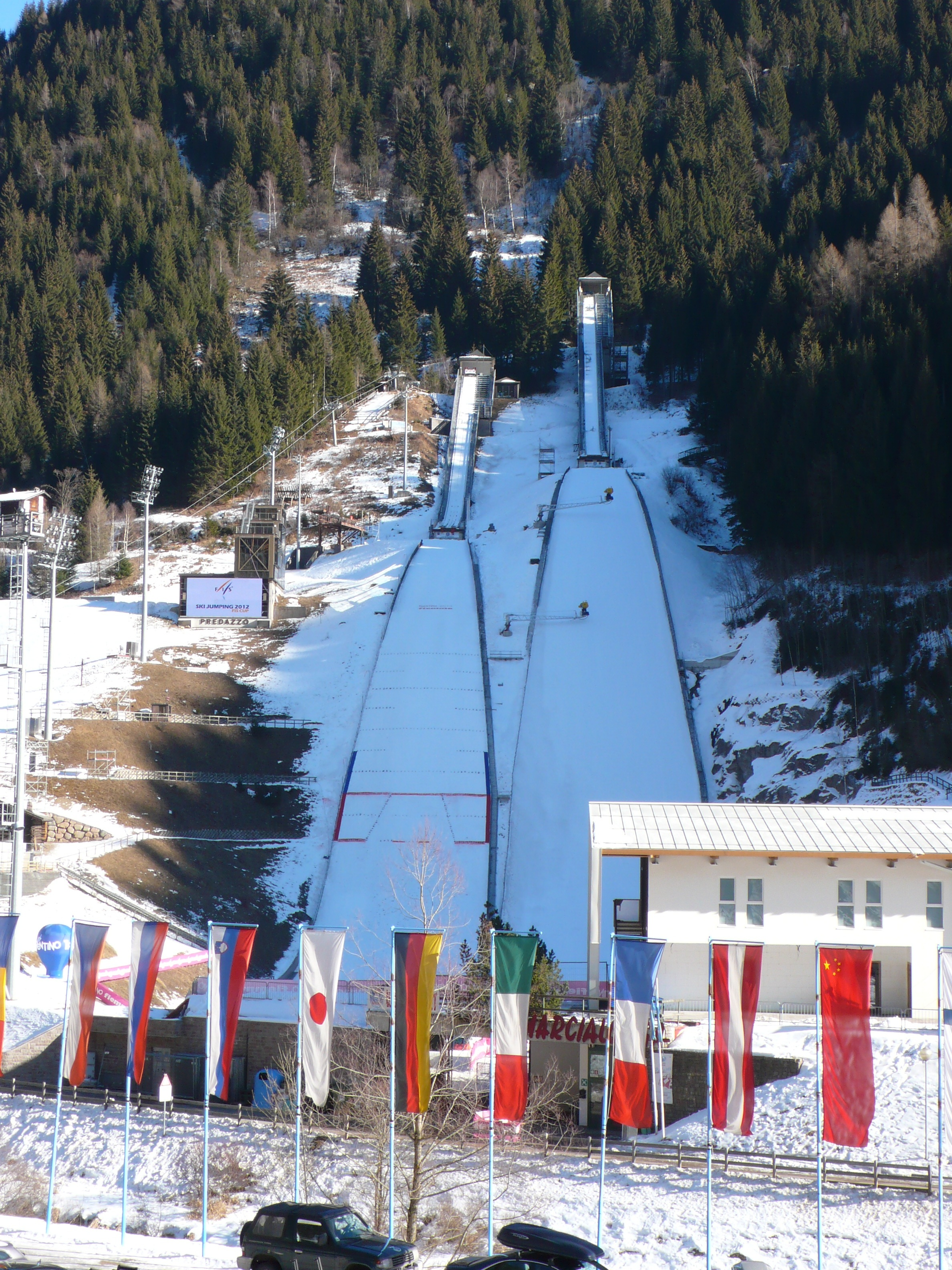
Trampolino Giuseppe Dal Ben, World Championship hills

== Main sights ==
Predazzo is home of a Geological Museum of the Dolomites, which offers guests the opportunity to learn about the geological and mineralogical properties of this alpine territory. There are also relevant educational and cultural itineraries, such as the GeoTrail Dòs Capèl, that is the oldest path of Italy that focuses on geology.

On the road from the town to Passo Rolle is the Forte Dossaccio, and Austrian fortification from World War I.

=== Traditional events ===
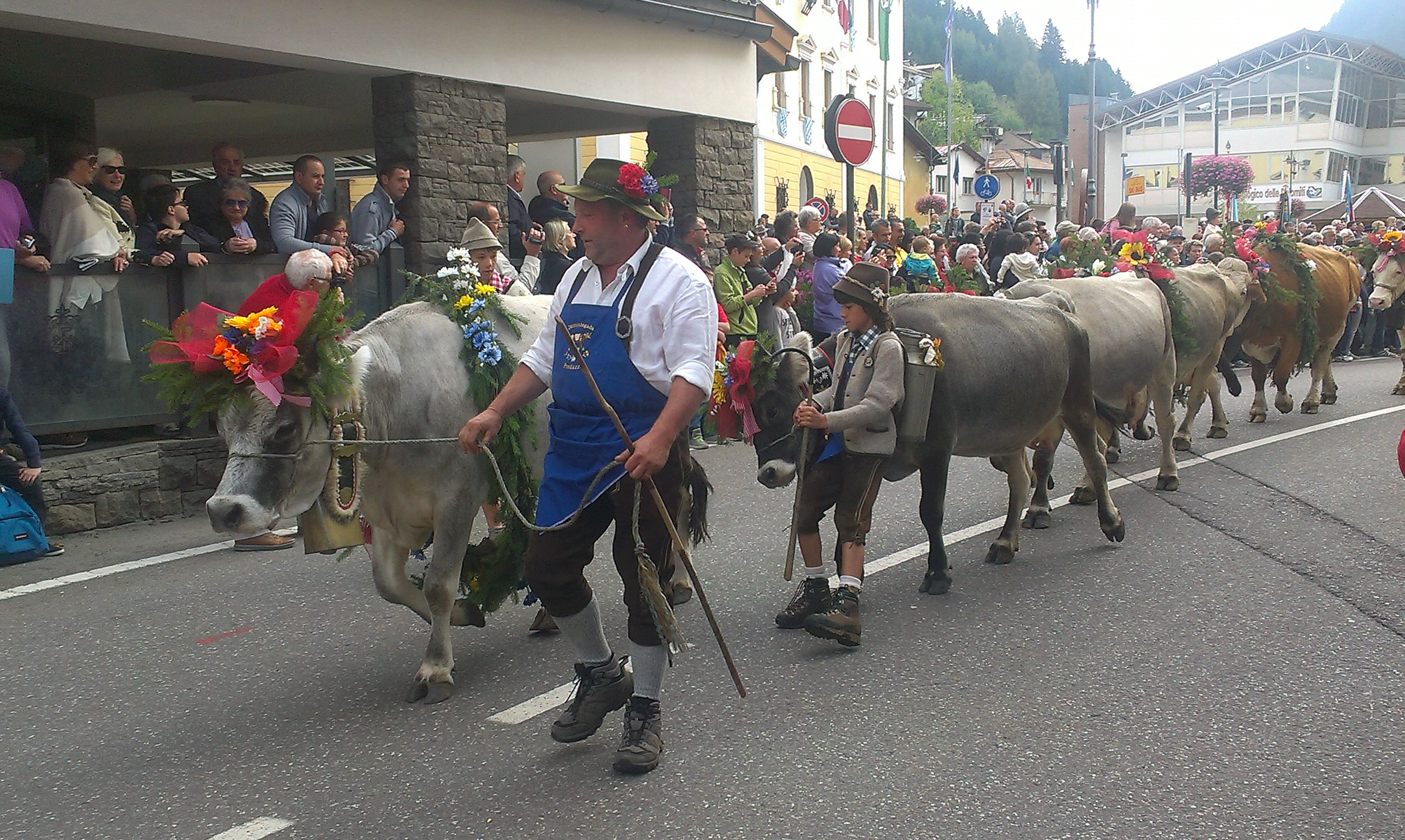
Alpine transhumance in Trentino-South Tyrol

There are also different traditional events during the year:

- Catanaoc 'n festa, that consists of gastronomic festival and historic commemoration.
- Saint Martin's fireworks (11 November), that is celebrated with huge bonfires and a cortége.
- Saint James' market (25 July)
- The Desmontegada de le Vache (beginning of October), an episode of alpine transhumance where the livestock is brought back to the valleys after the summer season on high pastures.

== Twin towns ==
- Hallbergmoos, Germany, since 1994
- Ferrere, Italy, since 2005 (friendship)

== Ski jumping ==
The ski jumping and the ski jumping part of Nordic combined was held here at the FIS Nordic World Ski Championships 1991, FIS Nordic World Ski Championships 2003 and FIS Nordic World Ski Championships 2013. In addition, Predazzo was one of the communities selected to host events during the 2026 Winter Olympics as part of the winning bid by Milan and Cortina d'Ampezzo.

== People ==
- Ivo Pertile, ski jumper
