= Jenny Hansson =

Swedish cross-country skier

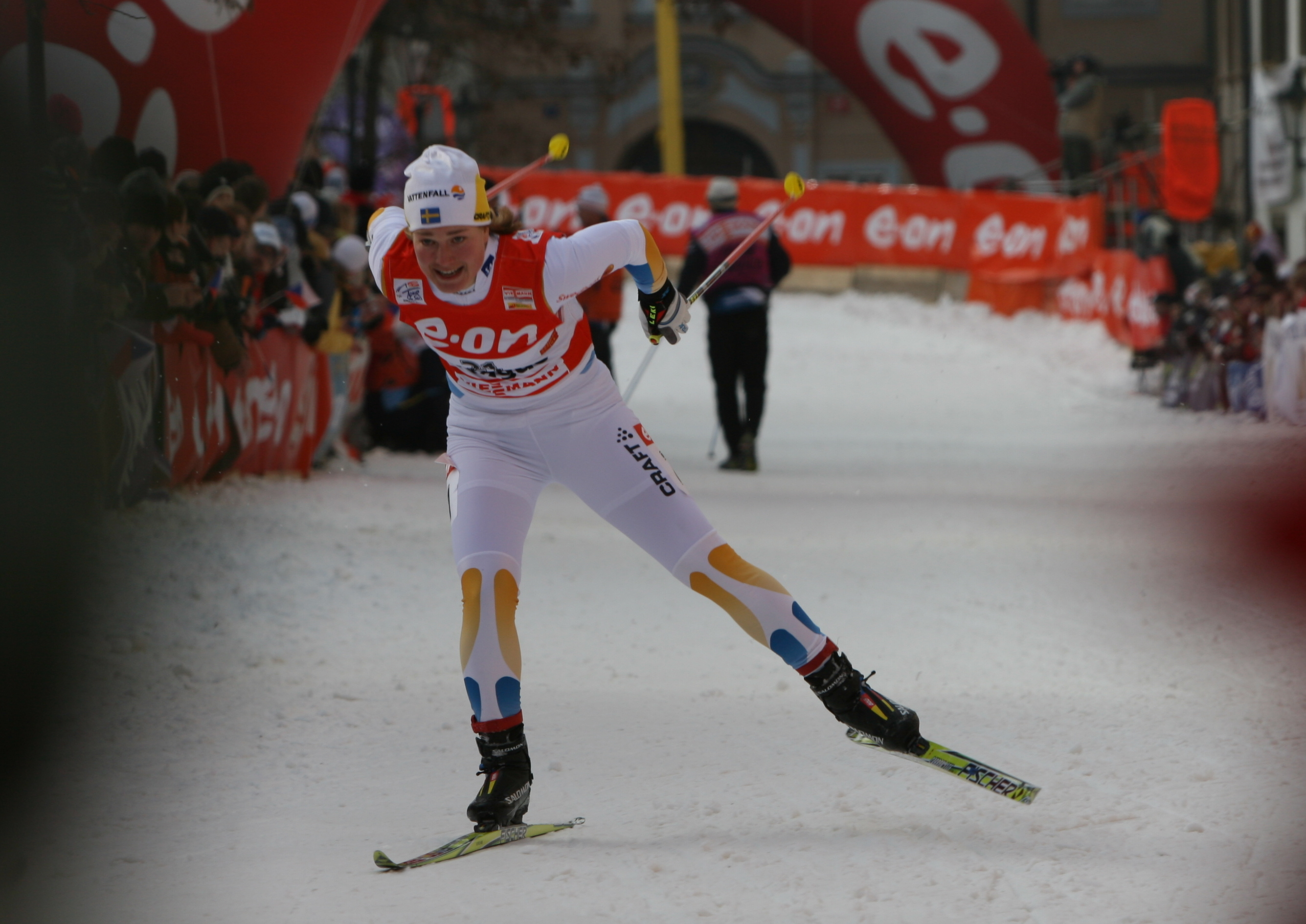
- Jenny Hansson in 2007

Personal information
- Full name: Jenny Maria Hansson
- Nationality: Sweden
- Born: 26 August 1980 Gällivare, Sweden

Sport
- Sport: Skiing
- Club: Åre Längdskidklubb

World Cup career
- Seasons: 6 – (2005, 2008–2009, 2011–2013)
- Indiv. starts: 19
- Indiv. podiums: 0
- Team starts: 4
- Team podiums: 1
- Team wins: 0
- Overall titles: 0
- Discipline titles: 0

Jenny Hansson, born 26 August 1980, is a Swedish former cross-country skier who competed between 2002 and 2013. Her best World Cup finish was third in the 4 × 5 km relay in Sweden in November 2008. Hansson's best individual finish was 39th in a 10 km event in Switzerland in 2007. She won Birkebeinerrennet in 2010, and in 2011 she won the women's race in the ski marathon Vasaloppet. In 2011, she won Tjejvasan.

She announced her retirement from cross-country skiing on 31 May 2013.

== Cross-country skiing results ==
All results are sourced from the International Ski Federation (FIS).

=== World Cup ===
==== Season standings ====
Season	Age	Discipline standings			Ski Tour standings		
Season	Age	Overall	Distance	Sprint	Nordic Opening	Tour de Ski	World Cup Final
2005	25	NC	NC	—	—N/a	—N/a	—N/a
2008	26	NC	NC	NC	—N/a	38	—
2009	29	NC	NC	NC	—N/a	DNF	—
2011	31	NC	NC	—	—	—	—
2012	32	NC	NC	—	—	—	—
2013	33	NC	NC	—	—	—	—

==== Team podiums ====
- 1 podium – (1 RL)

No.	Season	Date	Location	Race	Level	Place	Teammates
1	2008–09	23 November 2008	Gällivare, Sweden	4 × 5 km Relay C/F	World Cup	3rd	Johansson Norgren / Haag / Kalla
