= Mirco Bertolina =

Italian cross-country skier

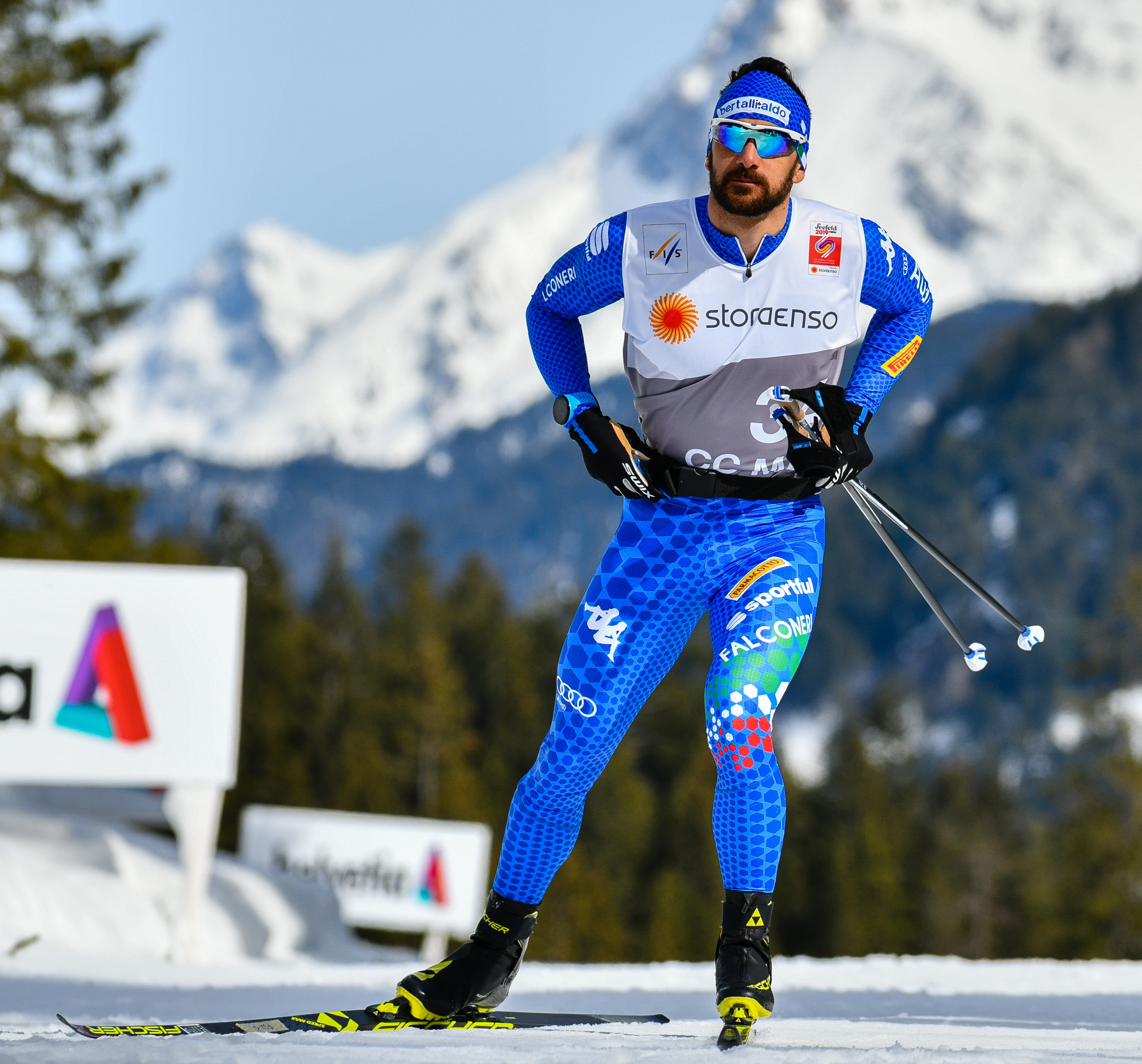
- Mirco Bertolina in March, 2019

Personal information
- Nationality: Italy
- Born: 11 May 1991 (age 35) Sondalo, Italy

Sport
- Sport: Skiing
- Club: C.S. Carabinieri

World Cup career
- Seasons: 5 – (2016–2019, 2021)
- Indiv. starts: 27
- Indiv. podiums: 0
- Team starts: 2
- Team podiums: 0
- Overall titles: 0 – (93rd in 2018)
- Discipline titles: 0
- Updated on 13 November 2021

Mirco Bertolina (born 11 May 1991) is an Italian cross-country skier. He competed in the 2018 Winter Olympics.

== Cross-country skiing results ==
All results are sourced from the International Ski Federation (FIS).

=== Olympic Games ===
Year	Age	15 km individual	30 km skiathlon	50 km mass start	Sprint	4 × 10 km relay	Team sprint
2018	26	44	—	—	41	—	—

=== World Championships ===
Year	Age	15 km individual	30 km skiathlon	50 km mass start	Sprint	4 × 10 km relay	Team sprint
2019	27	—	—	52	—	—	—
2021	29	DNS	—	—	—	—	—

=== World Cup ===
==== Season standings ====
Season	Age	Discipline standings			Ski Tour standings			
Season	Age	Overall	Distance	Sprint	Nordic Opening	Tour de Ski	World Cup Final	Ski Tour Canada
2016	24	NC	—	NC	—	—	—N/a	—
2017	25	NC	—	NC	—	—	—	—N/a
2018	26	93	61	NC	—	33	—	—N/a
2019	27	NC	NC	NC	—	—	—	—N/a
2021	29	134	NC	NC	—	42	—N/a	—N/a
