= Eugenia Bitchougova =

Russian cross-country skier

Eugenia Bitchougova (Russian: Евгения Бичугова; born 1958) is a Russian cross-country skier, who since 2010 has represented Italy.

== Career ==
In FIS Marathon Cup, Bitchougova finished ninth in general qualification. In total she reaced the podium twice, both in the Italian marathon Marcialonga (second place in 2001 and third place in 2003). She won the same cup in 1995, but at that time it wasn't part of FIS Marathon Cup. Except that, she started generally only in FIS Race. Only points in FIS Cross-Country World Cup she earned in 2004, when she was 18th in marathon Marcialonga, which exceptionally was the part of FIS Cross-Country World Cup calendar. She's never started in FIS Nordic World Ski Championships or Winter Olympic Games.

== Achievements ==
FIS Cross-Country World Cup

Places in general qualification
- season 2000/2001: 78.

FIS Marathon Cup

Places in general qualification
- season 2000/2001: 9.
- season 2001/2002: 19.
- season 2002/2003: 9.
