= Oskar Svärd =

Swedish cross-country skier, orienteer and military officer

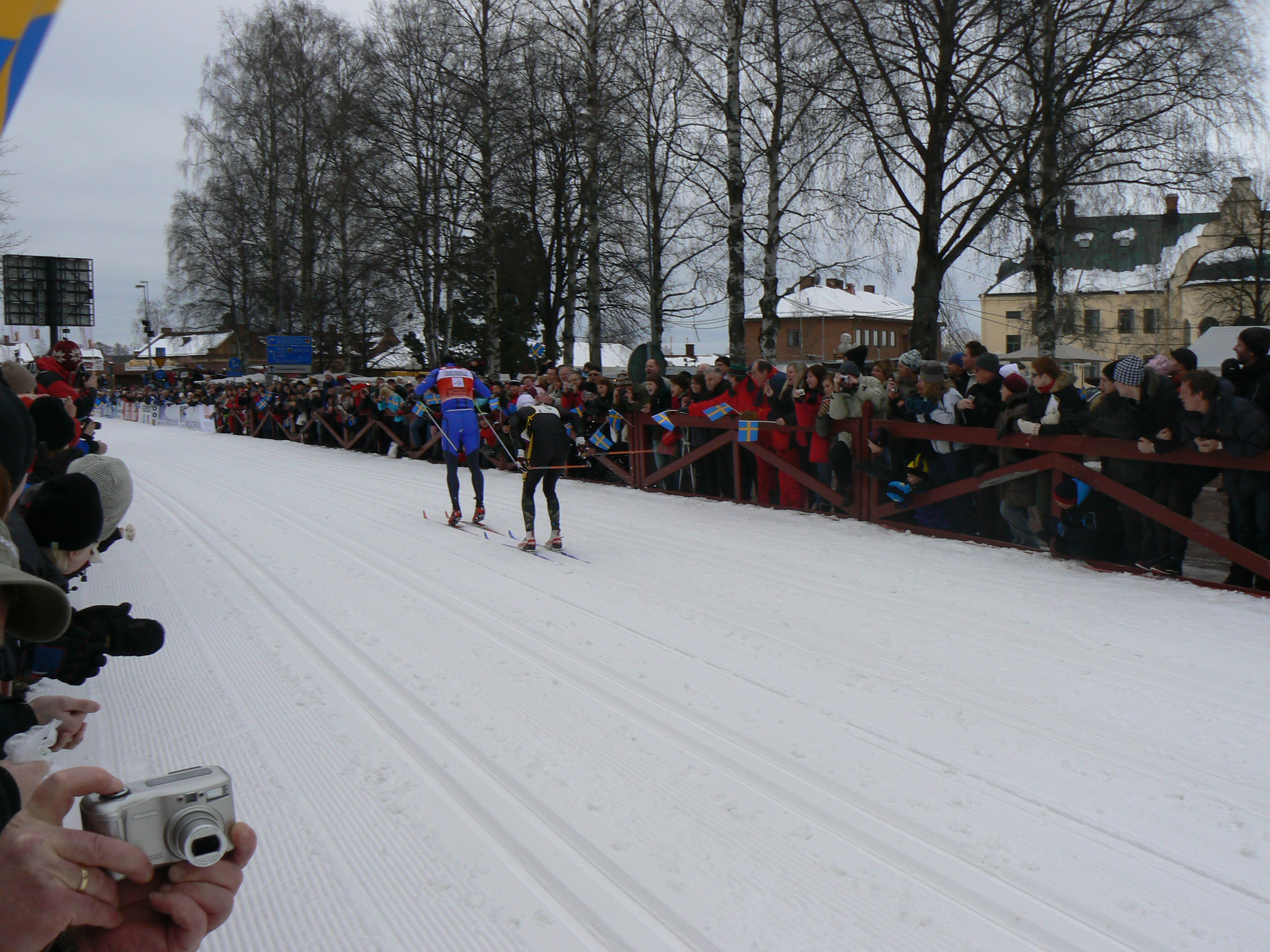
- Oskar Svärd during Vasaloppet in March 2007

Personal information
- Nationality: Sweden
- Born: 19 September 1976 (age 49) Tvärred, Sweden

Sport
- Sport: Skiing
- Club: Tvärreds IF

World Cup career
- Seasons: 3 – (2004–2006)
- Indiv. starts: 3
- Indiv. podiums: 0
- Team starts: 2
- Team podiums: 0
- Overall titles: 0 – (89h in 2006)
- Discipline titles: 0

Oskar Svärd (born 19 September 1976 in Tvärred, Sweden) is a Swedish cross-country skier. He is best known for winning the Vasaloppet three times (2003, 2005, 2007). In January 2010, he won Marcialonga.

== Cross-country skiing results ==
All results are sourced from the International Ski Federation (FIS).

=== World Cup ===
==== Season standings ====
Season	Age			
Season	Age	Overall	Distance	Sprint
2004	27	146	—	67
2005	28	NC	NC	—
2006	29	89	62	—
