= Ziano di Fiemme =

- Comune
- Comune di Ziano di Fiemme
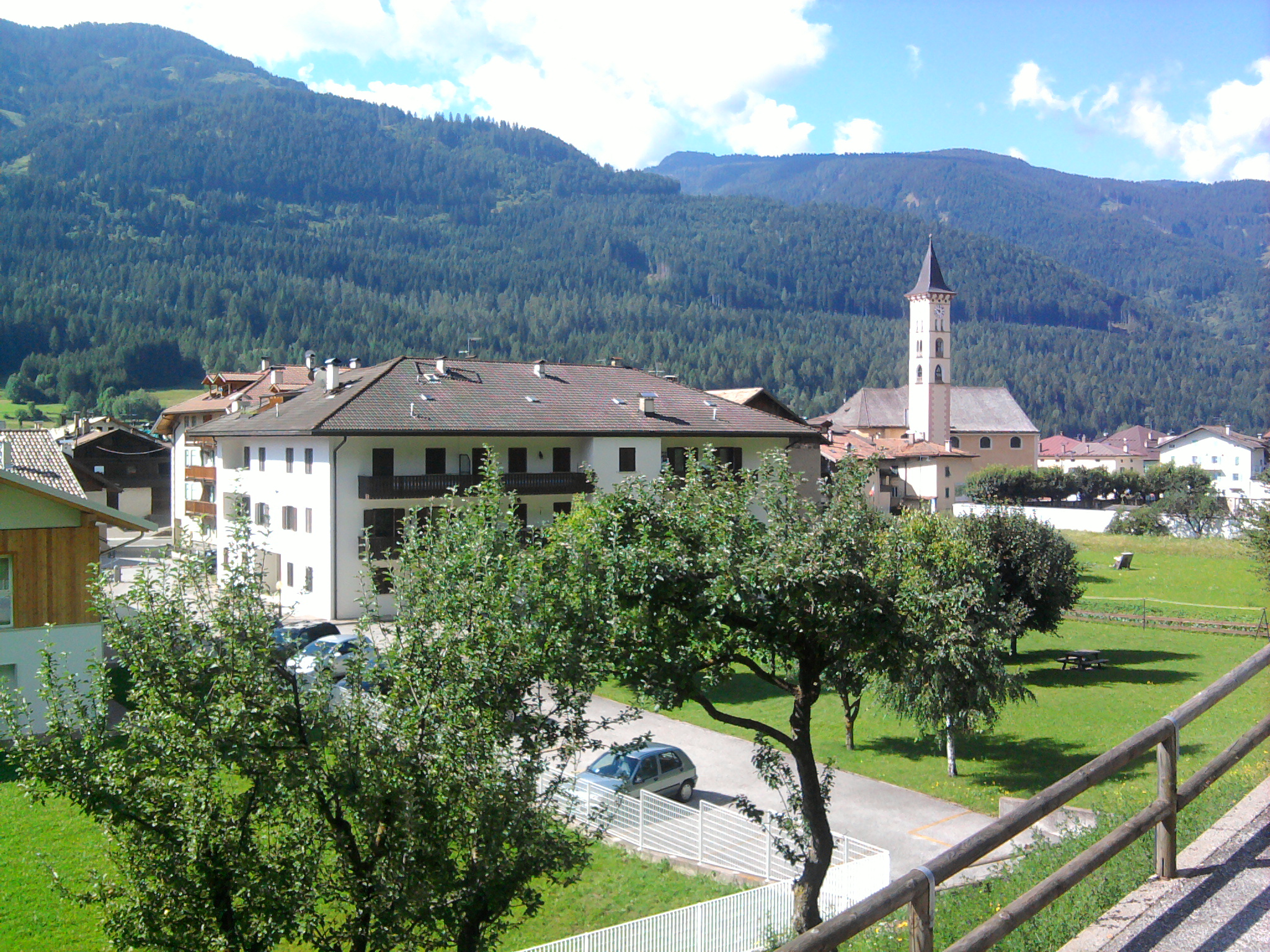

- Location within Italy Location within Trentino-Alto Adige/Südtirol
- Coordinates: 46°17′N 11°34′E
- Country: Italy
- Region: Trentino-Alto Adige/Südtirol
- Province: Trentino (TN)

Government
  - Mayor: Fabio Vanzetta

Area
  - Total: 35.8 km^{2} (13.8 sq mi)
- Elevation: 953 m (3,127 ft)

Population (31 December 2015)
  - Total: 1,718
  - Density: 48.0/km^{2} (124/sq mi)
- Demonym: Zianesi or Suaneri
- Time zone: UTC+1 (CET)
  - Summer (DST): UTC+2 (CEST)
- Postal code: 38030
- Dialing code: 0462
- Patron saint: Madonna of Loreto
- Saint day: 10 December
- Website: Official website

Ziano di Fiemme is a comune (municipality) in Trentino in the northern Italian region Trentino-Alto Adige/Südtirol, located about 40 kilometres (25 mi) northeast of Trento.
