= Maurizio Pozzi =

Italian cross-country skier

Personal information
- Nationality: Italy
- Born: 25 June 1970 (age 56) Bormio, Italy

Sport
- Sport: Skiing
- Club: G.S. Forestale

World Cup career
- Seasons: 12 – (1992–2002, 2004)
- Indiv. starts: 72
- Indiv. podiums: 1
- Indiv. wins: 0
- Team starts: 11
- Team podiums: 4
- Team wins: 2
- Overall titles: 0 – (23rd in 1998)
- Discipline titles: 0

Maurizio Pozzi (born 25 June 1970) is an Italian cross-country skier who competed between 1992 and 2008. His best World Cup finish was third in a 30 km event in Russia in 1997.

Pozzi also finished ninth in the 50 km event at the 1998 Winter Olympics in Nagano, Japan. He is member of the Gruppo Sportivo Forestale.

== Cross-country skiing results ==
All results are sourced from the International Ski Federation (FIS).

=== Olympic Games ===
Year	Age	10 km	Pursuit	30 km	50 km	4 × 10 km relay
1998	27	—	—	—	9	—

=== World Championships ===
Year	Age	10 km	15 km	Pursuit	30 km	50 km	Sprint	4 × 10 km relay
1993	22	—	—N/a	—	—	19	—N/a	—
1995	24	—	—N/a	—	—	20	—N/a	—
1997	26	—	—N/a	—	20	—	—N/a	—
1999	28	—	—N/a	—	12	—	—N/a	—
2001	30	—N/a	50	—	30	—	—	—

=== World Cup ===
==== Season standings ====
Season	Age					
Season	Age	Overall	Distance	Long Distance	Middle Distance	Sprint
1992	21	NC	—N/a	—N/a	—N/a	—N/a
1993	22	48	—N/a	—N/a	—N/a	—N/a
1994	23	NC	—N/a	—N/a	—N/a	—N/a
1995	24	45	—N/a	—N/a	—N/a	—N/a
1996	25	84	—N/a	—N/a	—N/a	—N/a
1997	26	28	—N/a	10	—N/a	52
1998	27	23	—N/a	21	—N/a	27
1999	28	26	—N/a	21	—N/a	47
2000	29	65	—N/a	65	44	NC
2001	30	78	—N/a	—N/a	—N/a	NC
2002	31	NC	—N/a	—N/a	—N/a	NC
2004	33	NC	NC	—N/a	—N/a	—

=== Individual podiums ===
- 1 podium

No.	Season	Date	Location	Race	Level	Place
1	1996–97	4 January 1997	Kavgolovo, Russia	30 km Individual F	World Cup	3rd

=== Team podiums ===
- 2 victories – (1 RL, 1 TS)
- 4 podiums – (3 RL, 1 TS)

No.	Season	Date	Location	Race	Level	Place	Teammate(s)
1	1996–97	15 December 1996	Brusson, Italy	4 × 10 km Relay F	World Cup	2nd	Valbusa / Godioz / Fauner
2	1996–97	19 January 1997	Lahti, Finland	12 × 1.5 km Team Sprint F	World Cup	1st	Di Centa
3	1998–99	29 November 1998	Muonio, Finland	4 × 10 km Relay F	World Cup	3rd	Maj / Fauner / Piller Cottrer
4	1999–00	28 November 1999	Kiruna, Sweden	4 × 10 km Relay F	World Cup	1st	Valbusa / Maj / Fauner
