= Silvio Fauner =

Italian cross-country skier (born 1968)

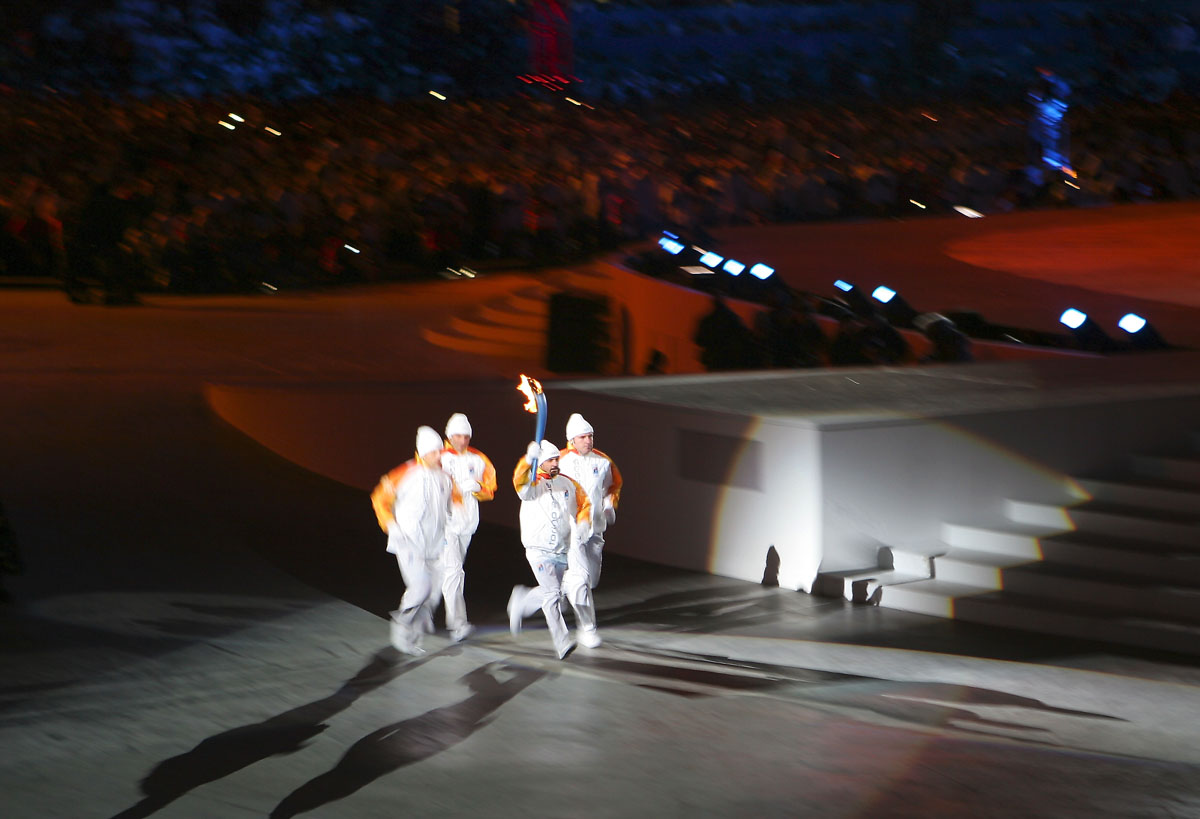

Personal information
- Nationality: Italy
- Born: 1 November 1968 (age 57) San Pietro di Cadore, Italy

Sport
- Sport: Skiing
- Club: C.S. Carabinieri

World Cup career
- Seasons: 19 – (1988–2006)
- Indiv. starts: 168
- Indiv. podiums: 19
- Indiv. wins: 3
- Team starts: 39
- Team podiums: 23
- Team wins: 6
- Overall titles: 0 – (3rd in 1995)
- Discipline titles: 0
Medal record
Men's cross-country skiing
Representing Italy
International Nordic ski competitions
Event	1st	2nd	3rd
Olympic Games	1	2	2
World Championships	1	2	4
Total	2	4	6
Olympic Games
Gold medal – first place	1994 Lillehammer	4 × 10 km relay
Silver medal – second place	1992 Albertville	4 × 10 km relay
Silver medal – second place	1998 Nagano	4 × 10 km relay
Bronze medal – third place	1994 Lillehammer	10 km + 15 km combined pursuit
Bronze medal – third place	1998 Nagano	30 km classical
World Championships
Gold medal – first place	1995 Thunder Bay	50 km freestyle
Silver medal – second place	1993 Falun	4 × 10 km relay
Silver medal – second place	1995 Thunder Bay	10 km + 15 km combined pursuit
Bronze medal – third place	1993 Falun	10 km + 15 km combined pursuit
Bronze medal – third place	1995 Thunder Bay	4 × 10 km relay
Bronze medal – third place	1997 Trondheim	4 × 10 km relay
Bronze medal – third place	1999 Ramsau	4 × 10 km relay
Junior World Championships
Silver medal – second place	1987 Asiago	30 km
Silver medal – second place	1988 Saalfelden	3 × 10 km relay
Bronze medal – third place	1987 Asiago	3 × 10 km relay

Silvio Fauner (born 1 November 1968 in San Pietro di Cadore, Province of Belluno) is an Italian former cross-country skier who competed from 1988 to 2006. His best-known victory was part of the 4 × 10 km relay team that upset Norway at the 1994 Winter Olympics in Lillehammer. He also won four other medals at the Winter Olympics with silvers in the 4 × 10 km relay (1992, 1998) and bronzes in the 15 km (1994) and 30 km (1998).

== Biography ==
Fauner also won six medals at the Nordic skiing World Championships, including 1 gold (50 km: 1995), 2 silvers (10 km + 15 km combined pursuit: 1995, 4 × 10 km relay: 1993), and 3 bronzes (4 × 10 km relay: 1995, 1997, 1999).

At the Opening Ceremony for the 2006 Winter Olympics in Turin on February 10, he and his 4 × 10 km relay teammates (Maurilio De Zolt, Marco Albarello, and Giorgio Vanzetta) who won the gold at the 1994 Winter Olympics in Lillehammer, were among the last carriers of the Olympic torch before it was lit by fellow Italian cross-country skier Stefania Belmondo.

In May 2007, Fauner was named the head coach of the Italian national cross-country ski team, replacing his former ski teammate Marco Albarello.

== Doping allegations ==
The Swedish investigative television show Uppdrag granskning claimed that Fauner had an exceptionally high haemoglobin level prior to a World Cup in Lahti in 1997. According to sources quoted in the documentary, Fauner had tested 19.2 g/dL. The test result was confirmed and signed by International Ski Federation (FIS) official Bengt-Erik Bengtsson. Currently, the allowed limit to compete in official FIS competition is 17.0 g/dL. According to Bengt Saltin, former chairman of the FIS medical committee, such a haemoglobin value is not possible to achieve without banned substances or blood doping.

== Cross-country skiing results ==
All results are sourced from the International Ski Federation (FIS).

=== Olympic Games ===
- 5 medals – (1, gold, 2 silver, 2 bronze)

Year	Age	10 km	15 km	Pursuit	30 km	50 km	Sprint	4 × 10 km relay
1992	23	10	—N/a	7	—	—	—N/a	Silver
1994	25	8	—N/a	Bronze	7	11	—N/a	Gold
1998	29	10	—N/a	4	Bronze	10	—N/a	Silver
2002	33	—N/a	—	—	51	—	14	—

=== World Championships ===
- 7 medals – (1 gold, 2 silver, 4 bronze)

Year	Age	10 km	15 km classical	15 km freestyle	Pursuit	30 km	50 km	Sprint	4 × 10 km relay
1989	20	—N/a	27	—	—N/a	28	—	—N/a	—
1991	22	20	—N/a	37	—N/a	—	—	—N/a	—
1993	24	6	—N/a	—N/a	Bronze	13	—	—N/a	Silver
1995	26	4	—N/a	—N/a	Silver	5	Gold	—N/a	Bronze
1997	28	11	—N/a	—N/a	10	45	14	—N/a	Bronze
1999	30	25	—N/a	—N/a	19	16	DNF	—N/a	Bronze
2001	32	—N/a	—	—N/a	—	—	DNF	7	—
2003	34	—N/a	—	—N/a	—	—	—	37	—

=== World Cup ===
==== Season standings ====
Season	Age					
Season	Age	Overall	Distance	Long Distance	Middle Distance	Sprint
1988	19	53	—N/a	—N/a	—N/a	—N/a
1989	20	NC	—N/a	—N/a	—N/a	—N/a
1990	21	54	—N/a	—N/a	—N/a	—N/a
1991	22	43	—N/a	—N/a	—N/a	—N/a
1992	23	14	—N/a	—N/a	—N/a	—N/a
1993	24	6	—N/a	—N/a	—N/a	—N/a
1994	25	5	—N/a	—N/a	—N/a	—N/a
1995	26	3rd place, bronze medalist(s)	—N/a	—N/a	—N/a	—N/a
1996	27	5	—N/a	—N/a	—N/a	—N/a
1997	28	5	—N/a	13	—N/a	3rd place, bronze medalist(s)
1998	29	9	—N/a	8	—N/a	11
1999	30	24	—N/a	26	—N/a	22
2000	31	26	—N/a	43	33	8
2001	32	25	—N/a	—N/a	—N/a	11
2002	33	32	—N/a	—N/a	—N/a	19
2003	34	95	—N/a	—N/a	—N/a	45
2004	35	96	62	—N/a	—N/a	—
2005	36	NC	—	—N/a	—N/a	NC
2006	37	166	121	—N/a	—N/a	—

==== Individual podiums ====
- 3 victories
- 19 podiums

No.	Season	Date	Location	Race	Level	Place
1	1991–92	8 December 1991	Silver Star, Canada	15 km Pursuit C	World Cup	3rd
2	1992–93	24 February 1993	Falun, Sweden	15 km Pursuit F	World Championships^{[1]}	3rd
3	1992–93	19 March 1993	Štrbské Pleso, Slovakia	15 km Individual C	World Cup	3rd
4	1993–94	22 December 1993	Toblach, Italy	15 km Pursuit F	World Cup	2nd
5	1993–94	19 February 1994	Lillehammer, Norway	15 km Pursuit F	Olympic Games^{[1]}	3rd
6	1994–95	17 December 1994	Sappada, Italy	15 km Individual F	World Cup	2nd
7	1994–95	14 January 1995	Nové Město, Czech Republic	15 km Individual C	World Cup	3rd
8	1994–95	4 February 1995	Falun, Sweden	30 km Individual C	World Cup	2nd
9	1994–95	13 March 1995	Thunder Bay, Canada	15 km Pursuit F	World Championships^{[1]}	2nd
10	1994–95	19 March 1995	Thunder Bay, Canada	50 km Individual F	World Championships^{[1]}	1st
11	1995–96	29 November 1995	Gällivare, Sweden	15 km Individual F	World Cup	3rd
12	1995–96	9 December 1995	Davos, Switzerland	30 km Individual C	World Cup	3rd
13	1995–96	13 December 1995	Brusson, Italy	15 km Individual F	World Cup	2nd
14	1995–96	4 February 1996	Reit im Winkl, Germany	1.0 km Sprint F	World Cup	3rd
15	1996–97	11 January 1997	Hakuba, Japan	10 km Individual C	World Cup	1st
16	1996–97	12 January 1997	Hakuba, Japan	15 km Pursuit F	World Cup	1st
17	1997–98	10 January 1998	Ramsau, Austria	30 km Individual F	World Cup	2nd
18	1999–00	3 March 2000	Lahti, Finland	1.0 km Sprint F	World Cup	3rd
19	2000–01	14 January 2001	Soldier Hollow, United States	1.0 km Sprint F	World Cup	3rd

==== Team podiums ====
- 6 victories – (5 RL, 1 TS)
- 23 podiums – (21 RL, 2 TS)

No.	Season	Date	Location	Race	Level	Place	Teammate(s)
1	1989–90	1 March 1990	Lahti, Finland	4 × 10 km Relay C/F	World Cup	1st	De Zolt / Vanzetta / Runggaldier
2	1991–92	18 February 1992	Albertville, France	4 × 10 km Relay C/F	Olympic Games^{[1]}	2nd	Pulie / Albarello / Vanzetta
3	1992–93	26 February 1993	Falun, Sweden	4 × 10 km Relay C/F	World Championships^{[1]}	2nd	De Zolt / Albarello / Vanzetta
4	1993–94	22 February 1994	Lillehammer, Norway	4 × 10 km Relay C/F	Olympic Games^{[1]}	1st	De Zolt / Albarello / Vanzetta
5	1993–94	13 March 1994	Falun, Sweden	4 × 10 km Relay F	World Cup	2nd	Barco / De Zolt / Vanzetta
6	1994–95	15 January 1995	Nové Město, Czech Republic	4 × 10 km Relay C	World Cup	3rd	Maj / Godioz / Albarello
7	1994–95	17 March 1995	Thunder Bay, Canada	4 × 10 km Relay C/F	World Championships^{[1]}	3rd	Valbusa / Albarello / Maj
8	1994–95	26 March 1995	Sapporo, Japan	4 x 10 km Relay C/F	World Cup	2nd	Albarello / Godioz / Maj
9	1995–96	3 February 1996	Seefeld, Austria	12 × 1.5 km Team Sprint F	World Cup	1st	Valbusa
10	1995–96	25 February 1996	Trondheim, Norway	4 × 10 km Relay C/F	World Cup	2nd	Di Centa / Albarello / Valbusa
11	1995–96	1 March 1996	Lahti, Finland	4 × 10 km Relay C/F	World Cup	1st	Albarello / Maj / Valbusa
12	1996–97	24 November 1996	Kiruna, Sweden	4 × 10 km Relay C	World Cup	2nd	Maj / Piller / Valbusa
13	1996–97	15 December 1996	Brusson, Italy	4 × 10 km Relay F	World Cup	2nd	Pozzi / Valbusa / Godioz
14	1996–97	28 February 1997	Trondheim, Norway	4 × 10 km Relay C/F	World Championships^{[1]}	3rd	Di Centa / Piller Cottrer / Valbusa
15	1997–98	7 December 1997	Santa Caterina, Italy	4 × 10 km Relay F	World Cup	2nd	Maj / Piller Cottrer / De Zolt Ponte
16	1997–98	11 January 1998	Ramsau, Austria	4 × 10 km Relay C/F	World Cup	1st	Maj / Valbusa / Piller Cottrer
17	1998–99	29 November 1998	Muonio, Finland	4 × 10 km Relay F	World Cup	3rd	Maj / Piller Cottrer / Pozzi
18	1998–99	10 January 1999	Nové Město, Czech Republic	4 × 10 km Relay C/F	World Cup	2nd	Valbusa / Maj / Piller Cottrer
19	1998–99	26 February 1999	Ramsau, Austria	4 × 10 km Relay C/F	World Championships^{[1]}	3rd	Di Centa / Valbusa / Maj
20	1998–99	8 March 1999	Vantaa, Finland	Team Sprint F	World Cup	3rd	Piller Cottrer
21	1998–99	21 March 1999	Oslo, Norway	4 × 10 km Relay C	World Cup	3rd	Di Centa / Maj / Valbusa
22	1999–00	28 November 1999	Kiruna, Sweden	4 × 10 km Relay F	World Cup	1st	Valbusa / Pozzi / Maj
23	2000–01	18 March 2001	Falun, Sweden	4 × 10 km Relay C/F	World Cup	3rd	Maj / Piller Cottrer / Zorzi

Note: ^{1} Until the 1999 World Championships and the 1994 Winter Olympics, World Championship and Olympic races were included in the World Cup scoring system.
