= Sergio Piller =

Italian cross-country skier (born 1969)

Personal information
- Nationality: Italy
- Born: 21 November 1969 (age 56)

Sport
- Sport: Skiing

World Cup career
- Seasons: 8 – (1992, 1994, 1996–2001)
- Indiv. starts: 31
- Indiv. podiums: 0
- Team starts: 5
- Team podiums: 1
- Team wins: 0
- Overall titles: 0 – (44th in 1998)
- Discipline titles: 0

Sergio Piller (born 21 November 1969) is a retired Italian cross-country skier.

He made his World Cup debut in December 1992 in Kavgolovo, and broke the top 30-barrier with a 21st place in December 1995 in Brusson. He broke the top 20 for the first time in March 1996 in Lahti, and recorded his highest placement with 11th in March 1998 in Falun. His last World Cup outing came in December 2000 in Brusson.

== Cross-country skiing results ==
All results are sourced from the International Ski Federation (FIS).

=== World Cup ===
==== Season standings ====
Season	Age				
Season	Age	Overall	Long Distance	Middle Distance	Sprint
1992	23	NC	—N/a	—N/a	—N/a
1994	25	NC	—N/a	—N/a	—N/a
1996	27	54	—N/a	—N/a	—N/a
1997	28	NC	—	—N/a	—
1998	29	44	45	—N/a	42
1999	30	101	65	—N/a	—
2000	31	NC	—	NC	—
2001	32	NC	—N/a	—N/a	NC

==== Team podiums ====
- 1 podium – (1 RL)

No.	Season	Date	Location	Race	Level	Place	Teammate(s)
1	1996–97	24 November 1996	Kiruna, Sweden	4 × 10 km Relay C	World Cup	2nd	Maj / Fauner / Valbusa
