= Fulvio Valbusa =

Italian cross-country skier

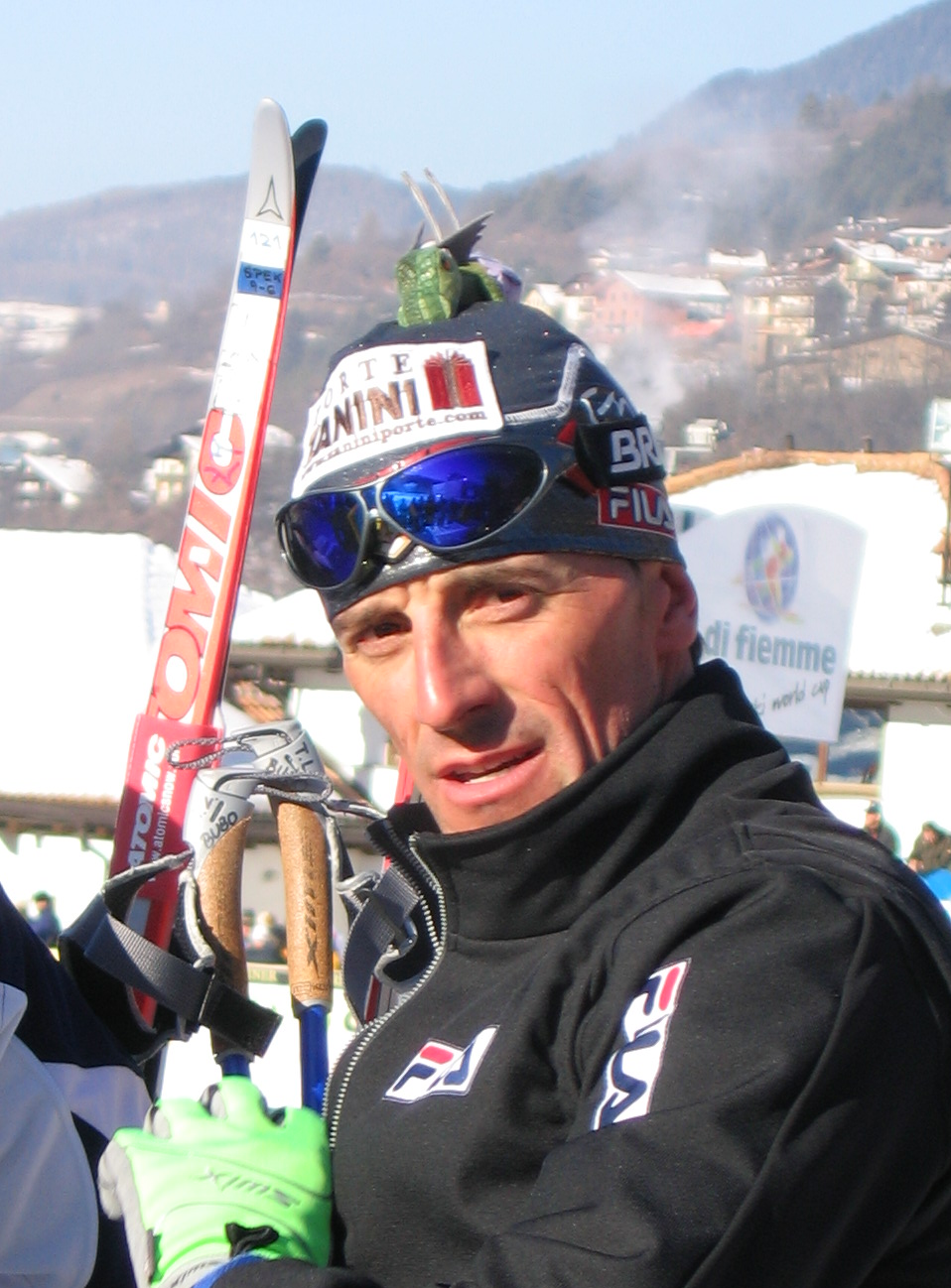
- Valbusa in 2006

Personal information
- Nationality: Italy
- Born: 15 February 1969 (age 57) Verona, Italy

Sport
- Sport: Skiing
- Club: G.S. Forestale

World Cup career
- Seasons: 15 – (1992–2006)
- Indiv. starts: 187
- Indiv. podiums: 13
- Indiv. wins: 2
- Team starts: 45
- Team podiums: 22
- Team wins: 7
- Overall titles: 0 – (3rd in 1997)
- Discipline titles: 0
Medal record
Men's cross-country skiing
Representing Italy
Olympic Games
Gold medal – first place	2006 Turin	4 × 10 km relay
Silver medal – second place	1998 Nagano	4 × 10 km relay
World Championships
Silver medal – second place	2005 Oberstdorf	15 km freestyle
Bronze medal – third place	1995 Thunder Bay	4 × 10 km relay
Bronze medal – third place	1997 Trondheim	4 × 10 km relay
Bronze medal – third place	1999 Ramsau	10 km + 15 km combined pursuit
Bronze medal – third place	1999 Ramsau	4 × 10 km relay
Junior World Championships
Silver medal – second place	1988 Saalfelden	30 km

Fulvio Valbusa (born 15 February 1969, in Verona) is an Italian cross-country skier who competed from 1992 to 2006. He won two medals in the 4 × 10 km relay at the Winter Olympics with a gold in 2006 and a silver in 1998. He also finished fifth in three other cross-country events at the 1998 Winter Olympics in Nagano (10 km + 15 km combined pursuit, 30 km, and 50 km).

Valbusa also won five medals at the FIS Nordic World Ski Championships, including one silver (15 km: 2005) and four bronzes (10 km + 15 km combined pursuit: 1999, 4 × 10 km relay: 1995, 1997, 1999). He also won three FIS races at 15 km in 1996, 1997, and 2004.

He is the older brother of cross-country skier Sabina Valbusa.

== Cross-country skiing results ==
All results are sourced from the International Ski Federation (FIS).

=== Olympic Games ===
- 2 medals – (1 gold, 1 silver)

Year	Age	10 km	15 km	Pursuit	30 km	50 km	Sprint	4 × 10 km relay	Team sprint
1992	23	—	—N/a	—	17	—	—N/a	—	—N/a
1994	25	29	—N/a	22	—	—	—N/a	—	—N/a
1998	29	11	—N/a	5	5	5	—N/a	Silver	—N/a
2002	33	—N/a	31	18	—	—	27	—	—N/a
2006	37	—N/a	12	—	—N/a	30	—	Gold	—

=== World Championships ===
- 4 medals – (1 silver, 3 bronze)

Year	Age	10 km	15 km	Pursuit	30 km	50 km	Sprint	4 × 10 km relay	Team sprint
1993	24	19	—N/a	11	—	—	—N/a	—	—N/a
1995	26	16	—N/a	16	—	—	—N/a	Bronze	—N/a
1997	28	6	—N/a	5	5	DNF	—N/a	Bronze	—N/a
1999	30	10	—N/a	Bronze	4	15	—N/a	Bronze	—N/a
2001	32	—N/a	26	8	—	14	—	6	—N/a
2003	34	—N/a	48	—	—	18	—	10	—N/a
2005	36	—N/a	Silver	9	—N/a	—	—	4	—

=== World Cup ===
==== Season standings ====
Season	Age					
Season	Age	Overall	Distance	Long Distance	Middle Distance	Sprint
1992	23	30	—N/a	—N/a	—N/a	—N/a
1993	24	30	—N/a	—N/a	—N/a	—N/a
1994	25	42	—N/a	—N/a	—N/a	—N/a
1995	26	22	—N/a	—N/a	—N/a	—N/a
1996	27	6	—N/a	—N/a	—N/a	—N/a
1997	28	3rd place, bronze medalist(s)	—N/a	7	—N/a	2nd place, silver medalist(s)
1998	29	6	—N/a	14	—N/a	5
1999	30	12	—N/a	7	—N/a	33
2000	31	33	—N/a	26	36	20
2001	32	7	—N/a	—N/a	—N/a	9
2002	33	48	—N/a	—N/a	—N/a	65
2003	34	14	—N/a	—N/a	—N/a	66
2004	35	8	7	—N/a	—N/a	50
2005	36	49	29	—N/a	—N/a	NC
2006	37	82	56	—N/a	—N/a	—

==== Individual podiums ====
- 2 victories
- 13 podiums

No.	Season	Date	Location	Race	Level	Place
1	1995–96	2 February 1996	Seefeld, Austria	10 km Individual F	World Cup	2nd
2	1995–96	10 March 1996	Falun, Sweden	15 km Pursuit C	World Cup	2nd
3	1996–97	7 December 1996	Davos, Switzerland	10 km Individual F	World Cup	3rd
4	1996–97	14 December 1996	Brusson, Italy	15 km Individual F	World Cup	2nd
5	1996–97	4 January 1997	Kavgolovo, Russia	30 km Individual F	World Cup	2nd
6	1997–98	16 December 1997	Val di Fiemme, Italy	15 km Individual F	World Cup	1st
7	1998–99	23 February 1999	Ramsau, Austria	15 km Pursuit F	World Championships^{[1]}	3rd
8	2000–01	13 January 2001	Soldier Hollow, United States	15 km Individual C	World Cup	3rd
9	2002–03	23 November 2002	Kiruna, Sweden	10 km Individual F	World Cup	3rd
10	2002–03	7 December 2002	Davos, Switzerland	15 km Individual F	World Cup	3rd
11	2002–03	15 February 2003	Asiago, Italy	10 km Individual C	World Cup	3rd
12	2003–04	6 February 2004	La Clusaz, France	15 km Individual F	World Cup	1st
13	2003–04	28 February 2004	Oslo, Norway	50 km Individual F	World Cup	2nd

==== Team podiums ====
- 7 victories – (5 RL, 2 TS)
- 22 podiums – (20 RL, 2 TS)

No.	Season	Date	Location	Race	Level	Place	Teammate(s)
1	1994–95	17 March 1995	Thunder Bay, Canada	4 × 10 km Relay C/F	World Championships^{[1]}	3rd	Albarello / Maj / Fauner
2	1995–96	14 January 1996	Nové Město, Czech Republic	4 × 10 km Relay C	World Cup	3rd	Maj / Vanzetta / Godioz
3	1995–96	3 February 1996	Seefeld, Austria	12 × 1.5 km Team Sprint F	World Cup	1st	Fauner
4	1995–96	25 February 1996	Trondheim, Norway	4 × 10 km Relay C/F	World Cup	2nd	Di Centa / Albarello / Fauner
5	1995–96	1 March 1996	Lahti, Finland	4 × 10 km Relay C/F	World Cup	1st	Albarello / Fauner / Maj
6	1996–97	24 November 1996	Kiruna, Sweden	4 × 10 km Relay C	World Cup	2nd	Maj / Fauner / Piller
7	1996–97	15 December 1996	Brusson, Italy	4 × 10 km Relay F	World Cup	2nd	Pozzi / Godioz / Fauner
8	1996–97	28 February 1997	Trondheim, Norway	4 × 10 km Relay C/F	World Championships^{[1]}	3rd	Di Centa / Fauner / Piller Cottrer
9	1997–98	11 January 1998	Ramsau, Austria	4 × 10 km Relay C/F	World Cup	1st	Maj / Piller Cottrer / Fauner
10	1998–99	10 January 1999	Nové Město, Czech Republic	4 × 10 km Relay C/F	World Cup	2nd	Maj / Piller Cottrer / Fauner
11	1998–99	26 February 1999	Ramsau, Austria	4 × 10 km Relay C/F	World Championships^{[1]}	3rd	Di Centa / Maj / Fauner
12	1998–99	21 March 1999	Oslo, Norway	4 × 10 km Relay C	World Cup	3rd	Fauner / Di Centa / Maj
13	1999–00	28 November 1999	Kiruna, Sweden	4 × 10 km Relay F	World Cup	1st	Pozzi / Maj / Fauner
14	1999–00	27 February 2000	Falun, Sweden	4 × 10 km Relay F	World Cup	1st	Maj / Piller Cottrer / Zorzi
15	2000–01	13 December 2000	Clusone, Italy	10 × 1.5 km Team Sprint F	World Cup	1st	Maj
16	2002–03	24 November 2002	Kiruna, Sweden	4 × 10 km Relay C/F	World Cup	1st	Di Centa / Piller Cottrer / Zorzi
17	2002–03	1 December 2002	Rukatunturi, Finland	2 × 5 km / 2 × 10 km Relay C/F	World Cup	3rd	Paruzzi / S. Valbusa / Piller Cottrer
18	2002–03	19 January 2003	Nové Město, Czech Republic	4 × 10 km Relay C/F	World Cup	2nd	Di Centa / Zorzi / Schwienbacher
19	2002–03	23 March 2003	Falun, Sweden	4 × 10 km Relay C/F	World Cup	2nd	Di Centa / Piller Cottrer / Zorzi
20	2003–04	11 January 2004	Otepää, Estonia	4 × 10 km Relay C/F	World Cup	2nd	Carrara / Checchi / Piller Cottrer
21	2004–05	21 November 2004	Gällivare, Sweden	4 × 10 km Relay C/F	World Cup	2nd	Di Centa / Piller Cottrer / Zorzi
22	2004–05	12 December 2004	Val di Fiemme, Italy	4 ×10 km Relay C/F	World Cup	2nd	Di Centa / Piller Cottrer / Zorzi

Note: ^{1} Until the 1999 World Championships, World Championship races were included in the World Cup scoring system.
