= Giorgio Di Centa =

Italian cross-country skier

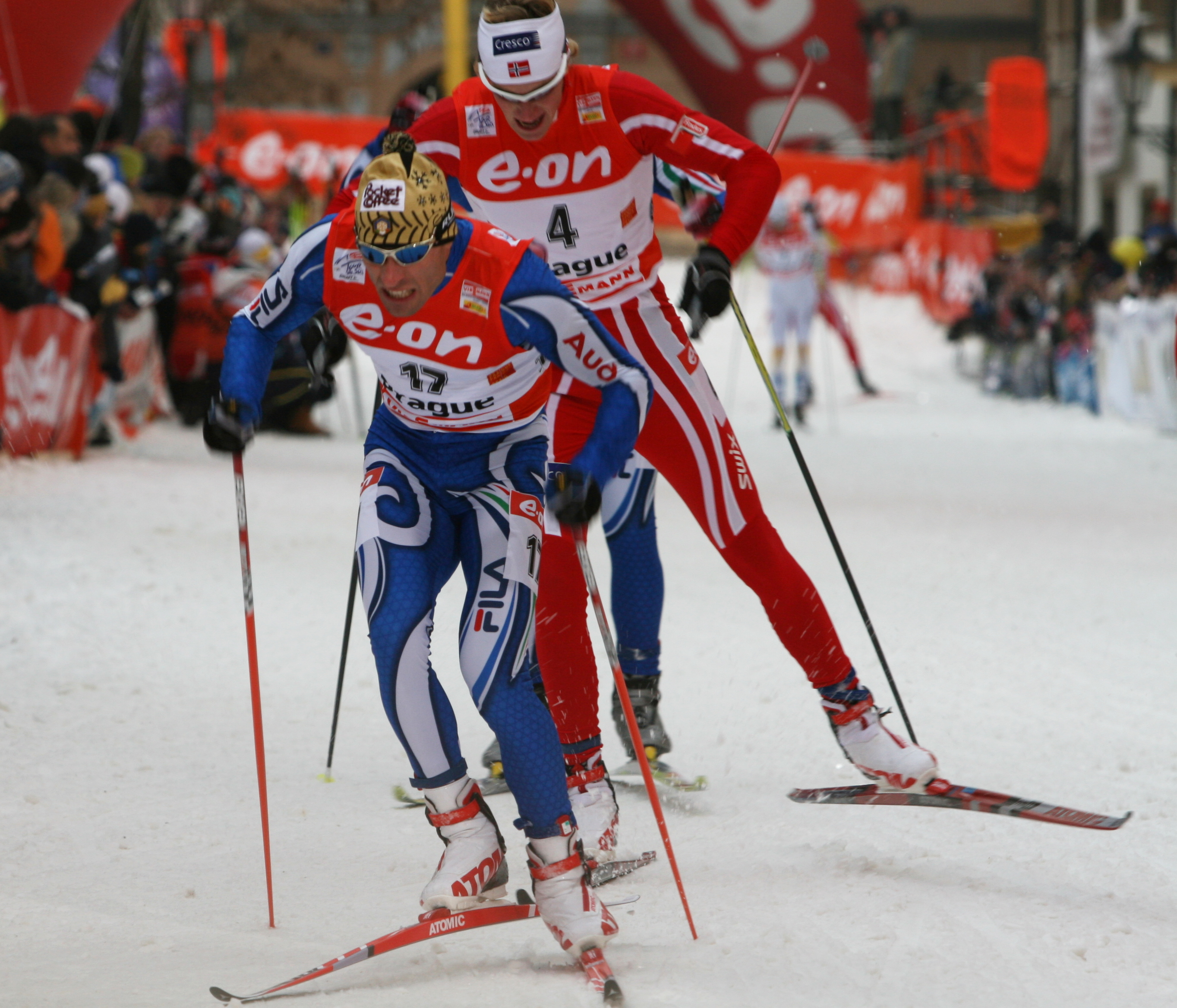
- Di Centa at the 2007 Tour de Ski in Prague.

Personal information
- Nationality: Italy
- Born: 7 October 1972 (age 53) Tolmezzo, Province of Udine, Italy

Sport
- Sport: Skiing
- Club: C.S. Carabinieri

World Cup career
- Seasons: 24 – (1994–2017)
- Indiv. starts: 334
- Indiv. podiums: 13
- Indiv. wins: 1
- Team starts: 59
- Team podiums: 23
- Team wins: 7
- Overall titles: 0 – (5th in 2008)
- Discipline titles: 0
Medal record
Men's cross-country skiing
Representing Italy
Olympic Games
Gold medal – first place	2006 Turin	50 km freestyle
Gold medal – first place	2006 Turin	4 × 10 km relay
Silver medal – second place	2002 Salt Lake City	4 × 10 km relay
World Championships
Silver medal – second place	2005 Oberstdorf	30 km pursuit
Bronze medal – third place	1997 Trondheim	4 × 10 km relay
Bronze medal – third place	1999 Ramsau	4 × 10 km relay
Bronze medal – third place	2009 Liberec	30 km pursuit
Junior World Championships
Silver medal – second place	1992 Vuokatti	30 km freestyle
Bronze medal – third place	1992 Vuokatti	4 × 10 km relay
- Updated on 14 April 2019

Giorgio Di Centa (born 7 October 1972 in Tolmezzo, Province of Udine) is an Italian former cross-country skier who won two gold medals at the 2006 Winter Olympics, including the individual 50 km freestyle race. He is the younger brother of Olympic gold medalist, cross-country skier Manuela Di Centa.

== Biography ==
Di Centa began cross-county skiing very early in a family in which his elder brother Andrea was also a professional skier. At the age of 16, he became a member of Italy's junior team while also skiing for the Carabinieri sport team. He became a member of Italy's senior team in 1995. He finished 8th in the 30 km event at the 1998 Winter Olympics.

After a silver medal at the 2005 FIS Nordic World Ski Championships in the double pursuit and a silver medal at the 2002 Winter Olympics in the 4 x 10 km. Di Centa, who had never won an individual race in the cross-country skiing World Cup, arrived in great shape for the 2006 Winter Olympics in Turin. He would finish a disappointing fourth in the 30 km double pursuit, losing a medal at the finish to fellow Italian Pietro Piller Cottrer. The two were also key players in the strongest Italian relay team ever, winning gold in the 4 x 10 km race.

Di Centa's greatest victory was in the 50 km race where he defeated Russian Eugeni Dementiev by 0.8 seconds, the closest 50 km event in Olympic history, eclipsing Thomas Wassberg's 4.9 second victory over Gunde Svan (both Sweden) at the 1984 Winter Olympics in Sarajevo. The medals ceremony for the 50 km occurred during the Closing Ceremony, where Di Centa's sister, Olympic medalist Manuela Di Centa, presented him with the gold medal. He won a bronze medal in the 15 km + 15 km double pursuit at the FIS Nordic World Ski Championships 2009 in Liberec.

For the 2010 Winter Olympics, a picture of Di Centa in competition during the 50 km event at the previous Olympics was used as a pictogram for the cross-country skiing events. In September 2009, it was announced that Di Centa was named flagbearer for the opening ceremony for the 2010 Games.

He retired on 1 March 2015 at the age of 42, after the end of the 50 km at the FIS Nordic World Ski Championships 2015.

On 20 December 2015, he returned to the World Cup race in the 15 km classic in Toblach, Italy.

The father of three children, his daughter Martina competed for Italy at the 2022 Winter Olympics in Cross-country skiing, also returning for the 2026 Olympics.

== Cross-country skiing results ==
All results are sourced from the International Ski Federation (FIS).

=== Olympic Games ===
- 3 medals – (2 gold, 1 silver)

Year	Age	10 km	15 km	Pursuit	30 km	50 km	Sprint	4 × 10 km relay	Team sprint
1998	25	—	—N/a	—	8	—	—N/a	—	—N/a
2002	29	—N/a	35	4	—	11	—	Silver	—N/a
2006	33	—N/a	—	4	—N/a	Gold	—	Gold	9
2010	37	—N/a	10	12	—N/a	11	—	9	—
2014	41	—N/a	—	11	—N/a	—	—	5	—

=== World Championships ===
- 4 medals – (1 silver, 3 bronze)

Year	Age	10 km	15 km	Pursuit	30 km	50 km	Sprint	4 × 10 km relay	Team sprint
1997	24	17	—N/a	12	—	—	—N/a	Bronze	—N/a
1999	26	18	—N/a	11	—	—	—N/a	Bronze	—N/a
2001	28	—N/a	—	18	34	—	—	—	—N/a
2003	30	—N/a	—	27	—	—	—	—	—N/a
2005	32	—N/a	14	Silver	—N/a	—	—	4	—
2007	34	—N/a	25	11	—N/a	31	—	9	—
2009	36	—N/a	—	Bronze	—N/a	4	—	4	—
2011	38	—N/a	—	10	—N/a	9	—	5	—
2013	40	—N/a	—	16	—N/a	19	—	4	—
2015	42	—N/a	—	—	—N/a	22	—	—	—

=== World Cup ===
==== Season standings ====
Season	Age	Discipline standings					Ski Tour standings			
Season	Age	Overall	Distance	Long Distance	Middle Distance	Sprint	Nordic Opening	Tour de Ski	World Cup Final	Ski Tour Canada
1994	21	NC	—N/a	—N/a	—N/a	—N/a	—N/a	—N/a	—N/a	—N/a
1995	22	81	—N/a	—N/a	—N/a	—N/a	—N/a	—N/a	—N/a	—N/a
1996	23	22	—N/a	—N/a	—N/a	—N/a	—N/a	—N/a	—N/a	—N/a
1997	24	16	—N/a	27	—N/a	11	—N/a	—N/a	—N/a	—N/a
1998	25	45	—N/a	35	—N/a	63	—N/a	—N/a	—N/a	—N/a
1999	26	25	—N/a	34	—N/a	35	—N/a	—N/a	—N/a	—N/a
2000	27	46	—N/a	61	38	39	—N/a	—N/a	—N/a	—N/a
2001	28	16	—N/a	—N/a	—N/a	12	—N/a	—N/a	—N/a	—N/a
2002	29	26	—N/a	—N/a	—N/a	31	—N/a	—N/a	—N/a	—N/a
2003	30	11	—N/a	—N/a	—N/a	55	—N/a	—N/a	—N/a	—N/a
2004	31	23	16	—N/a	—N/a	NC	—N/a	—N/a	—N/a	—N/a
2005	32	8	5	—N/a	—N/a	NC	—N/a	—N/a	—N/a	—N/a
2006	33	16	8	—N/a	—N/a	—	—N/a	—N/a	—N/a	—N/a
2007	34	36	29	—N/a	—N/a	80	—N/a	20	—N/a	—N/a
2008	35	5	7	—N/a	—N/a	38	—N/a	3rd place, bronze medalist(s)	3rd place, bronze medalist(s)	—N/a
2009	36	8	13	—N/a	—N/a	26	—N/a	4	15	—N/a
2010	37	10	6	—N/a	—N/a	102	—N/a	10	10	—N/a
2011	38	17	16	—N/a	—N/a	85	31	13	4	—N/a
2012	39	31	27	—N/a	—N/a	77	31	15	15	—N/a
2013	40	11	14	—N/a	—N/a	87	28	8	7	—N/a
2014	41	55	52	—N/a	—N/a	NC	26	17	—	—N/a
2015	42	104	62	—N/a	—N/a	NC	75	33	—N/a	—N/a
2016	43	NC	NC	—N/a	—N/a	—	—	—	—N/a	—
2017	44	NC	NC	—N/a	—N/a	NC	—	DNF	—	—N/a

==== Individual podiums ====
- 1 victory – (1 WC)
- 13 podiums – (10 WC, 3 SWC)

No.	Season	Date	Location	Race	Level	Place
1	1996–97	12 January 1997	Hakuba, Japan	15 km Individual F	World Cup	2nd
2	2000–01	28 December 2000	Engelberg, Switzerland	1.0 km Sprint C	World Cup	3rd
3	2003–04	25 January 2004	Val di Fiemme, Italy	70 km Mass Start C	World Cup	2nd
4	2004–05	27 November 2004	Rukatunturi, Finland	15 km Individual F	World Cup	3rd
5	2004–05	12 February 2005	Reit im Winkl, Germany	15 km Individual F	World Cup	2nd
6	2005–06	11 March 2006	Oslo, Norway	50 km Individual F	World Cup	2nd
7	2006–07	7 January 2007	Val di Fiemme, Italy	11 km Pursuit F	Stage World Cup	3rd
8	2007–08	28 December 2007 – 6 January 2008	(Czech Republic) (Italy) Tour de Ski	Overall Standings	World Cup	3rd
9	2007–08	22 January 2008	Canmore, Canada	15 km + 15 km Pursuit C/F	World Cup	2nd
10	2007–08	16 March 2008	Bormio, Italy	15 km Pursuit F	World Cup	3rd
11	2008–09	4 January 2009	Val di Fiemme, Italy	10 km Pursuit F	Stage World Cup	3rd
12	2009–10	5 February 2010	Canmore, Canada	15 km Individual F	World Cup	1st
13	2010–11	19 March 2011	Falun, Sweden	10 km + 10 km Pursuit C/F	Stage World Cup	2nd

==== Team podiums ====
- 7 victories – (2 RL, 5 TS)
- 23 podiums – (15 RL, 8 TS)

No.	Season	Date	Location	Race	Level	Place	Teammate(s)
1	1995–96	25 February 1996	Trondheim, Norway	4 × 10 km Relay C/F	World Cup	2nd	Albarello / Valbusa / Fauner
2	1996–97	19 January 1997	Lahti, Finland	12 × 1.5 km Team Sprint F	World Cup	1st	Pozzi
3	1996–97	28 February 1997	Trondheim, Norway	4 × 10 km Relay C/F	World Championships^{[1]}	3rd	Fauner / Piller Cottrer / Valbusa
4	1998–99	26 February 1999	Ramsau, Austria	4 × 10 km Relay M	World Championships^{[1]}	3rd	Valbusa / Maj / Fauner
5	1998–99	8 March 1999	Vantaa, Finland	Team Sprint F	World Cup	1st	Zorzi
6	1998–99	21 March 1999	Oslo, Norway	4 × 10 km Relay C	World Cup	3rd	Fauner / Maj / Valbusa
7	1999–00	8 December 1999	Asiago, Italy	Team Sprint F	World Cup	3rd	Zorzi
8	2000–01	13 December 2000	Clusone, Italy	10 × 1.5 km Team Sprint F	World Cup	2nd	Zorzi
9	2001–02	13 January 2002	Nové Město, Czech Republic	6 × 1.5 km Team Sprint F	World Cup	2nd	Zorzi
10	2001–02	3 March 2002	Lahti, Finland	6 × 1.5 km Team Sprint F	World Cup	1st	Zorzi
11	2002–03	24 November 2002	Kiruna, Sweden	4 × 10 km Relay C/F	World Cup	1st	Valbusa / Piller Cottrer / Zorzi
12	2002–03	8 December 2002	Davos, Switzerland	4 × 10 km Relay C/F	World Cup	2nd	Schwienbacher / Piller Cottrer / Zorzi
13	2002–03	19 January 2003	Nové Město, Czech Republic	4 × 10 km Relay C/F	World Cup	2nd	Valbusa / Zorzi / Schwienbacher
14	2002–03	26 January 2003	Oberhof, Germany	10 × 1.5 km Team Sprint F	World Cup	1st	Zorzi
15	2002–03	14 February 2003	Asiago, Italy	10 × 1.4 km Team Sprint F	World Cup	1st	Zorzi
16	2002–03	23 March 2003	Falun, Sweden	4 × 10 km Relay C/F	World Cup	2nd	Valbusa / Piller Cottrer / Zorzi
17	2004–05	21 November 2004	Gällivare, Sweden	4 × 10 km Relay C/F	World Cup	2nd	Valbusa / Piller Cottrer / Zorzi
18	2004–05	12 December 2004	Val di Fiemme, Italy	4 × 10 km Relay C/F	World Cup	2nd	Valbusa / Piller Cottrer / Zorzi
19	2004–05	20 March 2005	Falun, Sweden	4 × 10 km Relay C/F	World Cup	2nd	Clara / Checchi / Piller Cottrer
20	2005–06	15 January 2006	Val di Fiemme, Italy	4 × 10 km Relay C/F	World Cup	1st	Checchi / Piller Cottrer / Zorzi
21	2006–07	4 February 2007	Davos, Switzerland	4 × 10 km Relay C/F	World Cup	2nd	Checchi / Piller Cottrer / Santus
22	2007–08	9 December 2007	Davos, Switzerland	4 × 10 km Relay C/F	World Cup	2nd	Checchi / Piller Cottrer / Zorzi
23	2010–11	6 February 2011	Rybinsk, Russia	4 × 10 km Relay C/F	World Cup	2nd	Checchi / Clara / Piller Cottrer

Note: ^{1} Until the 1999 World Championships, World Championship races were included in the World Cup scoring system.

== See also ==
- List of flag bearers for Italy at the Olympics

Winter Olympics
Preceded by Carolina Kostner	Flag bearer for Italy; 2010 Vancouver	Succeeded by Armin Zöggeler
