= Jan Jacob Verdenius =

Norwegian cross-country skier (born 1973)

Personal information
- Nationality: Norway
- Born: 11 September 1973 (age 52)

Sport
- Sport: Skiing
- Club: Byåsen IL

World Cup career
- Seasons: 9 – (1994–2002)
- Indiv. starts: 53
- Indiv. podiums: 3
- Indiv. wins: 1
- Team starts: 1
- Team podiums: 0
- Overall titles: 0 – (18th in 2001)
- Discipline titles: 1 – (1 SP: 2001)

Jan Jacob Verdenius (born 11 September 1973) is a Norwegian cross-country skier who competed from 1994 to 2002. His only World Cup victory was in a sprint event at Engelberg, Switzerland in 2000.

Verdenius's best finish at the FIS Nordic World Ski Championships was tenth in the sprint event at Lahti in 2001.

His club was Byåsen IL.

== Cross-country skiing results ==
All results are sourced from the International Ski Federation (FIS).

=== World Championships ===
| Year | Age | 10 km | 15 km | Pursuit | 30 km | 50 km | Sprint | 4 × 10 km relay |
|---|---|---|---|---|---|---|---|---|
| 1995 | 21 | 81 | —N/a | — | — | — | —N/a | — |
| 1997 | 23 | 43 | —N/a | 45 | 52 | — | —N/a | — |
| 2001 | 27 | —N/a | — | — | — | 28 | 10 | — |

=== World Cup ===
==== Season standings ====
| Season | Age | | | | | |
| Season | Age | Overall | Distance | Long Distance | Middle Distance | Sprint |
|---|---|---|---|---|---|---|
| 1994 | 20 | NC | —N/a | —N/a | —N/a | —N/a |
| 1995 | 21 | NC | —N/a | —N/a | —N/a | —N/a |
| 1996 | 22 | NC | —N/a | —N/a | —N/a | —N/a |
| 1997 | 23 | NC | —N/a | NC | —N/a | NC |
| 1998 | 24 | NC | —N/a | NC | —N/a | — |
| 1999 | 25 | NC | —N/a | NC | —N/a | — |
| 2000 | 26 | NC | —N/a | NC | NC | — |
| 2001 | 27 | 18 | —N/a | —N/a | —N/a | 1st place, gold medalist(s) |
| 2002 | 28 | 54 | —N/a | —N/a | —N/a | 14 |

==== Individual podiums ====
- 1 victory
- 3 podiums

| No. | Season | Date | Location | Race | Level | Place |
|---|---|---|---|---|---|---|
| 1 | 2000–01 | 17 December 2000 | Brusson, Italy | 1.0 km Sprint F | World Cup | 2nd |
| 2 | 2000–01 | 28 December 2000 | Engelberg, Switzerland | 1.0 km Sprint C | World Cup | 1st |
| 3 | 2000–01 | 7 March 2001 | Oslo, Norway | 1.0 km Sprint C | World Cup | 3rd |
