= Pietro Piller Cottrer =

Italian cross-country skier

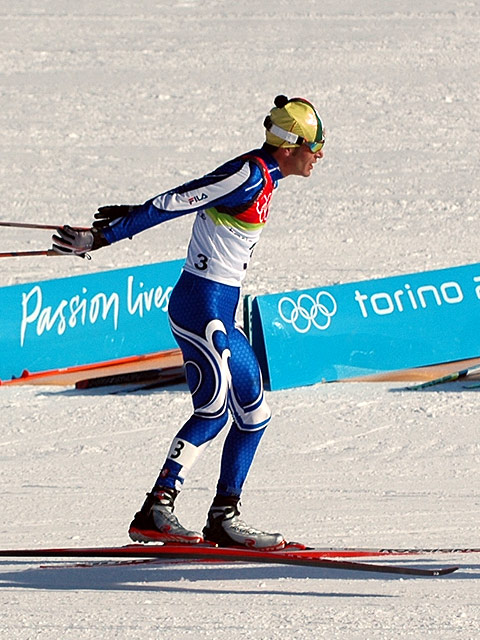
- Piller Cottrer at the 2006 Winter Olympics in Turin.

Personal information
- Nationality: Italy
- Born: 20 December 1974 (age 51) Pieve di Cadore, Italy

Sport
- Sport: Skiing
- Club: C.S. Carabinieri

World Cup career
- Seasons: 18 – (1995–2012)
- Indiv. starts: 229
- Indiv. podiums: 21
- Indiv. wins: 6
- Team starts: 47
- Team podiums: 20
- Team wins: 4
- Overall titles: 0 – (3rd in 2008)
- Discipline titles: 1 – (1 DI: 2009)
Medal record
Men's cross-country skiing
Representing Italy
Olympic Games
Gold medal – first place	2006 Turin	4 × 10 km relay
Silver medal – second place	2002 Salt Lake City	4 × 10 km relay
Silver medal – second place	2010 Vancouver	15 km freestyle
Bronze medal – third place	2006 Turin	30 km pursuit
World Championships
Gold medal – first place	2005 Oberstdorf	15 km freestyle
Bronze medal – third place	1997 Trondheim	4 × 10 km relay
Bronze medal – third place	2007 Sapporo	30 km pursuit

Pietro Piller Cottrer (born 20 December 1974) is an Italian former cross-country skier who won gold medal in the 4 ×10 km relay at the 2006 Winter Olympics in Turin. He was born at Sappada in the province of Udine.

== Career ==
Piller Cottrer's first relevant success in the cross-country skiing world cup came in 1997, when he won the 50 km race at the Holmenkollen Ski Festival. In the same year he won the bronze medal with the Italian relay at the 1997 World Championships in Trondheim. Thanks to Piller Cottrer's presence, the Italian relay confirmed as one of the best in the world winning silver medal in the 2002 Winter Olympics and, better, to gold medal in the home Olympics of Turin. He also won an Olympic bronze medal in the 15 + 15 km pursuit.

His successes include a World Championship gold medal in the 15 km freestyle pursuit at the 2005 World Championships, and a total of seven victories in the World Cup. The latest in Vancouver 2009.

Piller Cottrer won a bronze medal in the 15 km + 15 km double pursuit at the 2007 World Championships in Sapporo.

At the 2010 Winter Olympics in Vancouver Piller Cottrer skied a 34:00.9 in the 15 km freestyle event and won the silver medal. In February 2013, Piller Cottrer announced his retirement.

== Cross-country skiing results ==
All results are sourced from the International Ski Federation (FIS).

=== Olympic Games ===
- 4 medals – (1 gold, 2 silver, 1 bronze)

Year	Age	10 km	15 km	Pursuit	30 km	50 km	Sprint	4 × 10 km relay	Team sprint
1998	23	—	—N/a	—	—	16	—N/a	—	—N/a
2002	27	—N/a	—	8	4	—	—	Silver	—N/a
2006	31	—N/a	—	Bronze	—N/a	5	—	Gold	—
2010	35	—N/a	Silver	14	—N/a	26	—	9	—

=== World Championships ===
- 3 medals – (1 gold, 2 bronze)

Year	Age	10 km	15 km	Pursuit	30 km	50 km	Sprint	4 × 10 km relay	Team sprint
1995	20	—	—N/a	—	38	—	—N/a	—	—N/a
1997	22	—	—N/a	—	4	—	—N/a	Bronze	—N/a
2001	26	—N/a	—	9	—	8	—	6	—N/a
2003	28	—N/a	—	10	—	14	—	9	—N/a
2005	30	—N/a	Gold	20	—N/a	—	—	4	—
2007	32	—N/a	9	Bronze	—N/a	DNS	—	9	—
2009	34	—N/a	—	32	—N/a	11	—	4	—
2011	36	—N/a	—	13	—N/a	19	—	5	—

=== World Cup ===
==== Season standings ====
Season	Age	Discipline standings					Ski Tour standings		
Season	Age	Overall	Distance	Long Distance	Middle Distance	Sprint	Nordic Opening	Tour de Ski	World Cup Final
1995	20	51	—N/a	—N/a	—N/a	—N/a	—N/a	—N/a	—N/a
1996	21	60	—N/a	—N/a	—N/a	—N/a	—N/a	—N/a	—N/a
1997	22	13	—N/a	4	—N/a	5	—N/a	—N/a	—N/a
1998	23	17	—N/a	14	—N/a	21	—N/a	—N/a	—N/a
1999	24	38	—N/a	43	—N/a	42	—N/a	—N/a	—N/a
2000	25	23	—N/a	21	18	27	—N/a	—N/a	—N/a
2001	26	4	—N/a	—N/a	—N/a	18	—N/a	—N/a	—N/a
2002	27	15	—N/a	—N/a	—N/a	NC	—N/a	—N/a	—N/a
2003	28	18	—N/a	—N/a	—N/a	77	—N/a	—N/a	—N/a
2004	29	12	10	—N/a	—N/a	NC	—N/a	—N/a	—N/a
2005	30	35	19	—N/a	—N/a	—	—N/a	—N/a	—N/a
2006	31	13	7	—N/a	—N/a	—	—N/a	—N/a	—N/a
2007	32	17	27	—N/a	—N/a	NC	—N/a	27	—N/a
2008	33	3rd place, bronze medalist(s)	2nd place, silver medalist(s)	—N/a	—N/a	19	—N/a	7	4
2009	34	5	1st place, gold medalist(s)	—N/a	—N/a	54	—N/a	7	14
2010	35	15	11	—N/a	—N/a	NC	—N/a	DNF	11
2011	36	87	52	—N/a	—N/a	NC	27	—	—
2012	37	NC	NC	—N/a	—N/a	NC	84	—	—

==== Individual podiums ====
- 6 victories – (5 WC, 1 SWC)
- 21 podiums – (20 WC, 1 SWC)

No.	Season	Date	Location	Race	Level	Place
1	1996–97	15 March 1997	Oslo, Norway	50 km Individual F	World Cup	1st
2	1999–00	2 February 2000	Trondheim, Norway	10 km Individual F	World Cup	3rd
3	1999–00	26 February 2000	Falun, Sweden	15 km Individual F	World Cup	3rd
4	2000–01	14 March 2001	Borlänge, Sweden	10 km Individual F	World Cup	2nd
5	2000–01	25 March 2001	Kuopio, Finland	60 km Individual F	World Cup	2nd
6	2001–02	16 March 2002	Oslo, Norway	50 km Individual F	World Cup	3rd
7	2002–03	23 November 2002	Kiruna, Sweden	10 km Individual F	World Cup	2nd
8	2002–03	16 March 2003	Lahti, Finland	15 km Individual F	World Cup	3rd
9	2003–04	22 November 2003	Beitostølen, Norway	15 km Individual F	World Cup	1st
10	2003–04	6 January 2004	Falun, Sweden	15 km + 15 km Pursuit C/F	World Cup	2nd
11	2005–06	15 December 2005	Canmore, Canada	15 km Individual F	World Cup	1st
12	2005–06	14 January 2006	Val di Fiemme, Italy	30 km Mass Start F	World Cup	3rd
13	2007–08	15 December 2007	Rybinsk, Russia	30 km Mass Start F	World Cup	3rd
14	2007–08	1 January 2008	Nové Město, Czech Republic	15 km Pursuit F	Stage World Cup	1st
15	2007–08	25 January 2008	Canmore, Canada	15 km Individual F	World Cup	3rd
16	2007–08	14 March 2008	Bormio, Italy	3.3 km Individual F	World Cup	1st
17	2008–09	22 November 2008	Gällivare, Sweden	15 km Individual F	World Cup	2nd
18	2008–09	17 January 2009	Whistler, Canada	15 km + 15 km Pursuit C/F	World Cup	1st
19	2008–09	8 March 2009	Lahti, Finland	15 km Individual F	World Cup	2nd
20	2009–10	5 February 2010	Canmore, Canada	15 km Individual F	World Cup	2nd
21	2009–10	13 March 2010	Oslo, Norway	50 km Mass Start F	World Cup	2nd

==== Team podiums ====
- 4 victories – (4 RL)
- 20 podiums – (19 RL, 1 TS)

No.	Season	Date	Location	Race	Level	Place	Teammate(s)
1	1996–97	28 February 1997	Trondheim, Norway	4 × 10 km Relay C/F	World Championships^{[1]}	3rd	Di Centa / Fauner / F. Valbusa
2	1997–98	7 December 1997	Santa Caterina, Italy	4 × 10 km Relay F	World Cup	2nd	Maj / Fauner / De Zolt Ponte
3	1997–98	11 January 1998	Ramsau, Austria	4 × 10 km Relay C/F	World Cup	1st	Maj / F. Valbusa / Fauner
4	1998–99	29 November 1998	Muonio, Finland	4 × 10 km Relay F	World Cup	3rd	Maj / Fauner / Pozzi
5	1998–99	10 January 1999	Nové Město, Czech Republic	4 × 10 km Relay C/F	World Cup	2nd	F. Valbusa / Maj / Fauner
6	1998–99	8 March 1999	Vantaa, Finland	Team Sprint F	World Cup	3rd	Fauner
7	1999–00	27 February 2000	Falun, Sweden	4 × 10 km Relay F	World Cup	1st	F. Valbusa / Maj / Zorzi
8	2000–01	18 March 2001	Falun, Sweden	4 × 10 km Relay C/F	World Cup	3rd	Fauner / Maj / Zorzi
9	2002–03	24 November 2002	Kiruna, Sweden	4 × 10 km Relay C/F	World Cup	1st	Di Centa / F. Valbusa / Zorzi
10	2002–03	1 December 2002	Rukatunturi, Finland	2 × 5 km / 2 × 10 km Relay C/F	World Cup	3rd	Paruzzi / F. Valbusa / S. Valbusa
11	2002–03	8 December 2002	Davos, Switzerland	4 × 10 km Relay C/F	World Cup	2nd	Di Centa / Schwienbacher / Zorzi
12	2002–03	23 March 2003	Falun, Sweden	4 × 10 km Relay C/F	World Cup	2nd	Di Centa / F. Valbusa / Zorzi
13	2003–04	11 January 2004	Otepää, Estonia	4 × 10 km Relay C/F	World Cup	2nd	Carrara / Checchi / F. Valbusa
14	2004–05	21 November 2004	Gällivare, Sweden	4 × 10 km Relay C/F	World Cup	2nd	Di Centa / F. Valbusa / Zorzi
15	2004–05	12 December 2004	Val di Fiemme, Italy	4 × 10 km Relay C/F	World Cup	2nd	Di Centa / F. Valbusa / Zorzi
16	2004–05	20 March 2005	Falun, Sweden	4 × 10 km Relay C/F	World Cup	2nd	Clara / Checchi / Di Centa
17	2005–06	15 January 2006	Val di Fiemme, Italy	4 × 10 km Relay C/F	World Cup	1st	Di Centa / Checchi / Zorzi
18	2006–07	4 February 2007	Davos, Switzerland	4 × 10 km Relay C/F	World Cup	2nd	Checchi / Di Centa / Santus
19	2007–08	9 December 2007	Davos, Switzerland	4 × 10 km Relay C/F	World Cup	2nd	Di Centa / Checchi / Zorzi
20	2010–11	6 February 2011	Rybinsk, Russia	4 × 10 km Relay C/F	World Cup	2nd	Checchi / Di Centa / Clara

Note: ^{1} Until the 1999 World Championships, World Championship races were included in the World Cup scoring system.
