= Gaudenzio Godioz =

Italian cross-country skier

Personal information
- Nationality: Italy
- Born: 26 February 1968 (age 58)

Sport
- Sport: Skiing
- Club: G.S. Esercito

World Cup career
- Seasons: 9 – (1992–2000)
- Indiv. starts: 57
- Indiv. podiums: 0
- Team starts: 10
- Team podiums: 3
- Team wins: 0
- Overall titles: 0 – (15th in 1995)
- Discipline titles: 0
Medal record
Men's cross-country skiing
Representing Italy
Junior World Championships
| Silver medal – second place | 1988 Saafelden | 3 × 10 km relay |

Gaudenzio Godioz (born 26 February 1968) is an Italian cross-country skier who competed from 1992 to 2000. His best World Cup finish was sixth twice, both in the 30 km events with one each in 1992 and in 1995.

Godioz's best finish at the FIS Nordic World Ski Championships was ninth in the 50 km event at Thunder Bay in 1995. Participating in the 50 km event of the 1999 Italian men's championships of cross-country skiing, he finished third. Godioz, Nicola Invernizzi and Emanuel Conta competed in the "international military" class at the Patrouille des Glaciers in 2000, where they placed ninth in the total ranking.

== Cross-country skiing results ==
All results are sourced from the International Ski Federation (FIS).

=== World Championships ===
| Year | Age | 10 km | Pursuit | 30 km | 50 km | 4 × 10 km relay |
|---|---|---|---|---|---|---|
| 1995 | 27 | 33 | 14 | — | 9 | — |

=== World Cup ===
==== Season standings ====
| Season | Age | | | | |
| Season | Age | Overall | Long Distance | Middle Distance | Sprint |
|---|---|---|---|---|---|
| 1992 | 24 | 47 | —N/a | —N/a | —N/a |
| 1993 | 25 | 35 | —N/a | —N/a | —N/a |
| 1994 | 26 | 29 | —N/a | —N/a | —N/a |
| 1995 | 27 | 15 | —N/a | —N/a | —N/a |
| 1996 | 28 | 26 | —N/a | —N/a | —N/a |
| 1997 | 29 | 61 | 43 | —N/a | 65 |
| 1998 | 30 | 69 | 43 | —N/a | — |
| 1999 | 31 | 78 | NC | —N/a | 75 |
| 2000 | 32 | NC | — | NC | — |

==== Team podiums ====
- 3 podiums

| No. | Season | Date | Location | Race | Level | Place | Teammates |
|---|---|---|---|---|---|---|---|
| 1 | 1994–95 | 15 January 1995 | Nové Město, Czech Republic | 4 × 10 km Relay C | World Cup | 3rd | Maj / Fauner / Albarello |
| 2 | 1994–95 | 26 March 1995 | Sapporo, Japan | 4 x 10 km Relay C/F | World Cup | 2nd | Albarello / Fauner / Maj |
| 3 | 1996–97 | 15 December 1996 | Brusson, Italy | 4 × 10 km Relay F | World Cup | 2nd | Pozzi / Valbusa / Fauner |
