= Cristian Zorzi =

Italian cross-country skier

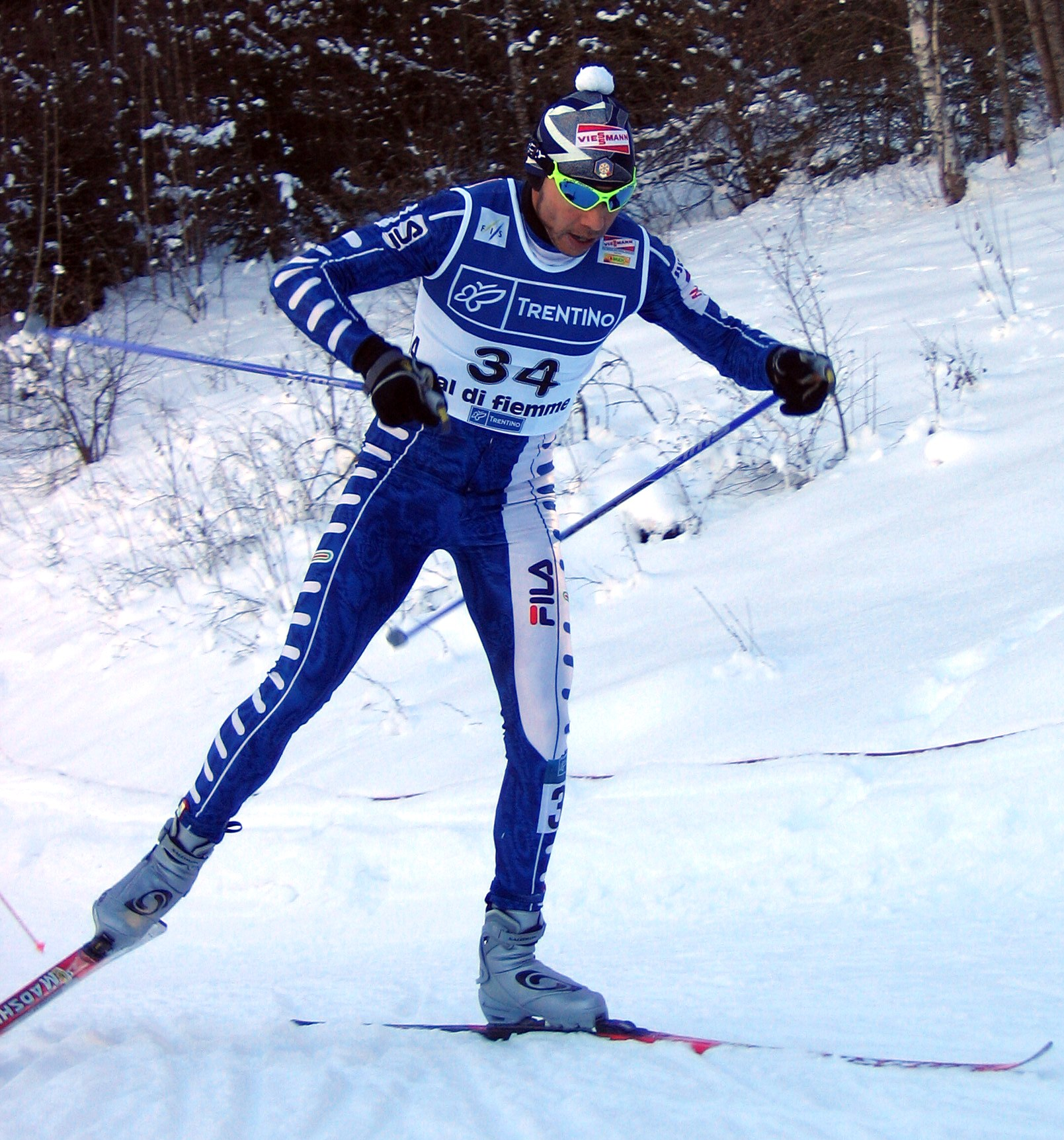
- Zorzi in 2006

Personal information
- Nationality: Italy
- Born: 14 August 1972 (age 54) Cavalese, Italy

Sport
- Sport: Skiing
- Club: G.S. Fiamme Gialle

World Cup career
- Seasons: 17 – (1994–2010)
- Indiv. starts: 186
- Indiv. podiums: 12
- Indiv. wins: 5
- Team starts: 51
- Team podiums: 19
- Team wins: 8
- Overall titles: 0 – (7th in 2002)
- Discipline titles: 0
Medal record
Men's cross-country skiing
Representing Italy
Olympic Games
Gold medal – first place	2006 Turin	4 × 10 km relay
Silver medal – second place	2002 Salt Lake City	4 × 10 km relay
Bronze medal – third place	2002 Salt Lake City	Individual sprint
World Championships
Gold medal – first place	2007 Sapporo	Team sprint
Silver medal – second place	2001 Lahti	Individual sprint
Junior World Championships
Bronze medal – third place	1992 Vuokatti	4 × 10 km relay

Cristian Zorzi (born 14 August 1972) is an Italian former cross-country skier who excelled at sprint ski races. He is nicknamed Zorro, for his exuberant character.

== Biography ==
Zorzi's first major success was at the 2000 Cross-Country Skiing World Cup, where he finished in second place. At the 2002 Winter Olympics in Salt Lake City, he won a silver medal in the 4 × 10 km relay and a bronze in the individual sprint.

At the 2006 Winter Olympics in Turin, he was the anchor on the Italian 4 × 10 km relay team that won the gold medal in those games.

Zorzi won two medals at the FIS Nordic World Ski Championships; a gold medal in the team sprint in 2007 and a silver in the individual sprint in 2001. He has also finished second in the 2000–01 Sprint World Cup, which he followed up with a third place in the following 2001–02 season.

== Cross-country skiing results ==
All results are sourced from the International Ski Federation (FIS).

=== Olympic Games ===
- 3 medals – (1 gold, 1 silver, 1 bronze)

Year	Age	15 km	Pursuit	30 km	50 km	Sprint	4 × 10 km relay	Team sprint
2002	29	—	—	9	—	Bronze	Silver	—N/a
2006	33	—	—	—N/a	—	4	Gold	—
2010	37	—	—	—N/a	—	—	9	8

=== World Championships ===
- 2 medals – (1 gold, 1 silver)

Year	Age	15 km	Pursuit	30 km	50 km	Sprint	4 × 10 km relay	Team sprint
2001	28	—	—	—	DNF	Silver	6	—N/a
2003	30	—	—	—	—	8	10	—N/a
2005	32	17	—	—N/a	—	—	4	4
2007	34	66	—	—N/a	—	—	9	Gold
2009	36	—	—	—N/a	12	23	—	—

=== World Cup ===
==== Season standings ====
Season	Age	Discipline standings					Ski Tour standings	
Season	Age	Overall	Distance	Long Distance	Middle Distance	Sprint	Tour de Ski	World Cup Final
1994	21	NC	—N/a	—N/a	—N/a	—N/a	—N/a	—N/a
1995	22	NC	—N/a	—N/a	—N/a	—N/a	—N/a	—N/a
1996	23	79	—N/a	—N/a	—N/a	—N/a	—N/a	—N/a
1997	24	52	—N/a	28	—N/a	—	—N/a	—N/a
1998	25	53	—N/a	NC	—N/a	40	—N/a	—N/a
1999	26	53	—N/a	NC	—N/a	58	—N/a	—N/a
2000	27	10	—N/a	NC	8	5	—N/a	—N/a
2001	28	11	—N/a	—N/a	—N/a	2nd place, silver medalist(s)	—N/a	—N/a
2002	29	7	—N/a	—N/a	—N/a	3rd place, bronze medalist(s)	—N/a	—N/a
2003	30	12	—N/a	—N/a	—N/a	5	—N/a	—N/a
2004	31	57	108	—N/a	—N/a	25	—N/a	—N/a
2005	32	21	23	—N/a	—N/a	14	—N/a	—N/a
2006	33	23	59	—N/a	—N/a	12	—N/a	—N/a
2007	34	101	85	—N/a	—N/a	61	44	—N/a
2008	35	76	NC	—N/a	—N/a	46	31	DNF
2009	36	41	63	—N/a	—N/a	18	48	49
2010	37	77	125	—N/a	—N/a	37	—	—

==== Individual podiums ====
- 5 victories – (5 WC)
- 12 podiums – (11 WC, 1 SWC)

No.	Season	Date	Location	Race	Level	Place
1	1999–00	3 March 2000	Lahti, Finland	1.0 km Sprint F	World Cup	1st
2	2000–01	17 December 2000	Brusson, Italy	1.0 km Sprint F	World Cup	3rd
3	2000–01	29 December 2000	Engelberg, Switzerland	1.0 km Sprint F	World Cup	2nd
4	2000–01	14 January 2001	Soldier Hollow, United States	1.0 km Sprint F	World Cup	1st
5	2001–02	9 December 2001	Cogne, Italy	1.5 km Sprint F	World Cup	1st
6	2001–02	27 December 2001	Garmisch-Partenkirchen, Germany	1.5 km Sprint F	World Cup	1st
7	2002–03	19 December 2002	Linz, Austria	1.5 km Sprint F	World Cup	3rd
8	2002–03	12 February 2003	Reit im Winkl, Germany	1.5 km Sprint F	World Cup	1st
9	2002–03	20 March 2003	Borlänge, Sweden	1.5 km Sprint F	World Cup	3rd
10	2004–05	23 October 2004	Düsseldorf, Germany	1.5 km Sprint F	World Cup	3rd
11	2005–06	4 February 2006	Davos, Switzerland	1.1 km Sprint F	World Cup	2nd
12	2008–09	1 January 2009	Nové Město, Czech Republic	1.2 km Sprint F	Stage World Cup	3rd

==== Team podiums ====
- 8 victories – (3 RL, 5 TS)
- 19 podiums – (9 RL, 10 TS)

No.	Season	Date	Location	Race	Level	Place	Teammate(s)
1	1998–99	8 March 1999	Vantaa, Finland	Team Sprint F	World Cup	1st	Di Centa
2	1999–00	8 December 1999	Asiago, Italy	Team Sprint F	World Cup	3rd	Di Centa
3	2000–01	13 December 2000	Clusone, Italy	10 × 1.5 km Team Sprint F	World Cup	2nd	Di Centa
4	2000–01	27 February 2000	Falun, Sweden	4 × 10 km Relay F	World Cup	1st	Valbusa / Maj / Piller Cottrer
5	2001–02	13 January 2002	Nové Město, Czech Republic	6 × 1.5 km Team Sprint F	World Cup	2nd	Di Centa
6	2001–02	3 March 2002	Lahti, Finland	6 × 1.5 km Team Sprint F	World Cup	1st	Di Centa
7	2002–03	24 November 2002	Kiruna, Sweden	4 × 10 km Relay C/F	World Cup	1st	Di Centa / Valbusa / Piller Cottrer
8	2002–03	8 December 2002	Davos, Switzerland	4 × 10 km Relay C/F	World Cup	2nd	Di Centa / Schwienbacher / Piller Cottrer
9	2002–03	19 January 2003	Nové Město, Czech Republic	4 × 10 km Relay C/F	World Cup	2nd	Di Centa / Valbusa / Schwienbacher
10	2002–03	26 January 2003	Oberhof, Germany	10 × 1.5 km Team Sprint F	World Cup	1st	Di Centa
11	2002–03	14 February 2003	Asiago, Italy	10 × 1.4 km Team Sprint F	World Cup	1st	Di Centa
12	2002–03	23 February 2003	Falun, Sweden	4 × 10 km Relay C/F	World Cup	2nd	Di Centa / Valbusa / Piller Cottrer
13	2003–04	21 November 2004	Gällivare, Sweden	4 × 10 km Relay C/F	World Cup	2nd	Di Centa / Valbusa / Piller Cottrer
14	2003–04	5 December 2004	Bern, Switzerland	6 × 1.1 km Team Sprint F	World Cup	3rd	Pasini
15	2003–04	12 December 2004	Val di Fiemme, Italy	4 × 10 km Relay C/F	World Cup	2nd	Di Centa / Valbusa / Piller Cottrer
16	2005–06	15 January 2006	Val di Fiemme, Italy	4 × 10 km Relay C/F	World Cup	1st	Di Centa / Checchi / Piller Cottrer
17	2005–06	18 March 2006	Sapporo, Japan	6 × 1.5 km Team Sprint F	World Cup	1st	Frasnelli
18	2006–07	29 October 2006	Düsseldorf, Germany	6 × 1.5 km Team Sprint F	World Cup	3rd	Pasini
19	2007–08	9 December 2007	Davos, Switzerland	4 × 10 km Relay C/F	World Cup	2nd	Di Centa / Checchi / Piller Cottrer
