= Verdenius =

Verdenius is a surname. Notable people with the surname include:

- Jan Jacob Verdenius (born 1973), Norwegian skier
- Willem Jacob Verdenius (1913–1998), Dutch classicist
