= Valerio Checchi =

Italian cross-country skier

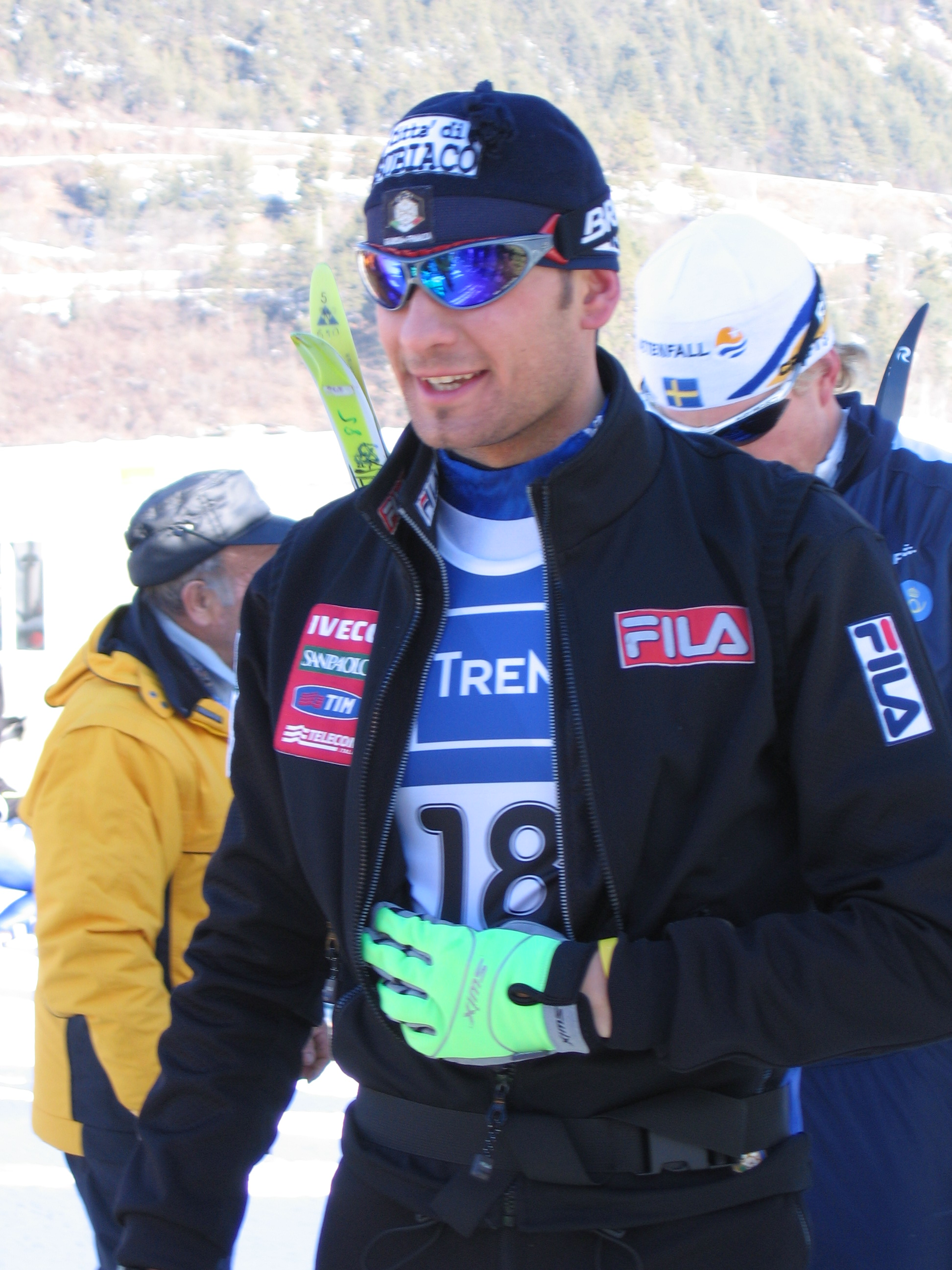
- Valerio Checchi in 2008

Personal information
- Nationality: Italy
- Born: 3 April 1980 (age 46) Subiaco, Italy

Sport
- Sport: Skiing
- Club: G.S. Forestale

World Cup career
- Seasons: 13 – (2002–2014)
- Indiv. starts: 163
- Indiv. podiums: 4
- Indiv. wins: 1
- Team starts: 27
- Team podiums: 6
- Team wins: 1
- Overall titles: 0 – (10th in 2008)
- Discipline titles: 0

Valerio Checchi (born Subiaco, Lazio, 3 April 1980) is an Italian cross-country skier who has competed since 1999. He has two World Cup victories, with one in 2006 and another in 2008.

At the 2006 Winter Olympics in Turin, Checchi finished 18th in the 15 km + 15 km double pursuit event and 36th in the 15 km event. Checchi's best finish at the FIS Nordic World Ski Championships was fourth in the 4 × 10 km relay at Liberec in 2009.

Checchi finished ninth in the 4 × 10 km relay event at the 2010 Winter Olympics in Vancouver, British Columbia, Canada.

== Anti-doping rule violation ==
In 2014, Checchi was handed a one-year ban from sports for three whereabouts failures in 18 months. The ban ended 13 April 2015.

== Cross-country skiing results ==
All results are sourced from the International Ski Federation (FIS).

=== Olympic Games ===
Year	Age	15 km individual	30 km skiathlon	50 km mass start	Sprint	4 × 10 km relay	Team sprint
2006	25	38	18	—	—	—	—
2010	29	19	—	31	—	4	—

=== World Championships ===
Year	Age	15 km	Pursuit	30 km	50 km	Sprint	4 × 10 km relay	Team sprint
2003	22	—	37	28	—	—	—	—N/a
2005	24	—	24	—N/a	16	—	—	—
2007	26	60	26	—N/a	DNF	—	—	—
2009	28	24	21	—N/a	—	—	4	—
2011	30	—	25	—N/a	—	—	5	—
2013	32	—	35	—N/a	36	—	—	—

=== World Cup ===
==== Season standings ====
Season	Age	Discipline standings			Ski Tour standings		
Season	Age	Overall	Distance	Sprint	Nordic Opening	Tour de Ski	World Cup Final
2002	21	NC	—N/a	NC	—N/a	—N/a	—N/a
2003	22	103	—N/a	—	—N/a	—N/a	—N/a
2004	23	46	29	—	—N/a	—N/a	—N/a
2005	24	39	20	—	—N/a	—N/a	—N/a
2006	25	29	17	—	—N/a	—N/a	—N/a
2007	26	81	49	NC	—N/a	DNF	—N/a
2008	27	10	6	68	—N/a	15	13
2009	28	66	41	NC	—N/a	32	—
2010	29	31	22	NC	—N/a	14	DNF
2011	30	66	39	NC	25	DNF	—
2012	31	74	47	NC	62	DNF	—
2013	32	111	73	NC	DNF	33	—
2014	33	156	99	NC	67	—	—

==== Individual podiums ====
- 1 victory – (1 WC)
- 4 podiums – (2 WC, 2 SWC)

No.	Season	Date	Location	Race	Level	Place
1	2007–08	29 December 2007	Nové Město, Czech Republic	15 km Pursuit F	Stage World Cup	3rd
2	2007–08	1 January 2008	Nové Město, Czech Republic	15 km Pursuit F	Stage World Cup	2nd
3	2007–08	25 January 2008	Canmore, Canada	15 km Individual F	World Cup	1st
4	2008–09	17 January 2009	Whistler, Canada	15 km + 15 km Skiathlon C/F	World Cup	3rd

==== Team podiums ====
- 1 victory – (1 RL)
- 6 podiums – (6 RL)

No.	Season	Date	Location	Race	Level	Place	Teammates
1	2003–04	11 January 2004	Otepää, Estonia	4 × 10 km Relay C/F	World Cup	2nd	Carrara / Piller Cottrer / Valbusa
2	2004–05	20 March 2005	Falun, Sweden	4 × 10 km Relay C/F	World Cup	2nd	Clara / Piller Cottrer / Di Centa
3	2005–06	15 January 2006	Val di Fiemme, Italy	4 × 10 km Relay C/F	World Cup	1st	Di Centa / Piller Cottrer / Zorzi
4	2006–07	4 February 2007	Davos, Switzerland	4 × 10 km Relay C/F	World Cup	2nd	Di Centa / Piller Cottrer / Santus
5	2007–08	9 December 2007	Davos, Switzerland	4 × 10 km Relay C/F	World Cup	2nd	Di Centa / Piller Cottrer / Zorzi
6	2010–11	6 February 2011	Rybinsk, Russia	4 × 10 km Relay C/F	World Cup	2nd	Di Centa / Clara / Piller Cottrer
