= Cross-country skiing at the 2006 Winter Olympics – Men's 4 × 10 kilometre relay =

Men's 4 × 10 kilometre relay at the XX Olympic Winter Games
- Venue: Pragelato
- Dates: 19 February 2006
- Competitors: 64 from 16 nations
- Teams: 16
- Winning time: 1:43:45.7

Medalists
1st place, gold medalist(s)		Giorgio Di Centa; Pietro Piller Cottrer; Fulvio Valbusa; Cristian Zorzi	Italy
2nd place, silver medalist(s)		Tobias Angerer; Jens Filbrich; Andreas Schlütter; René Sommerfeldt	Germany
3rd place, bronze medalist(s)		Mathias Fredriksson; Mats Larsson; Johan Olsson, Anders Södergren	Sweden

The men's 4 × 10 kilometre relay cross-country skiing competition at the 2006 Winter Olympics in Turin, Italy, was held on 19 February at Pragelato.

A World Cup event in the relay was held at Beitostølen, Norway, on 20 November 2005, and Germany's team of Andreas Schlütter, Axel Teichmann, Jens Filbrich and Tobias Angerer won the competition. The defending World Champions were Norway, with a team of Odd-Bjørn Hjelmeset, Frode Estil, Lars Berger and Tore Ruud Hofstad. The Norwegians were also the defending Olympic champion, with Anders Aukland, Estil, Kristen Skjeldal and Thomas Alsgaard winning gold in Salt Lake. At Nagano in 1998, the Norwegians beat the Italians by less than one tenth of a second, and in 1994 at Lillehammer the Italians beat the Norwegians by less than one tenth of a second. In the previous three Olympics, the winning team beat the silver medalists by a cumulative time of just under one tenth of a second. One further relay event was held before the Olympics, at Val di Fiemme on 15 January 2006, which was won by an Italian team consisting of Giorgio Di Centa, Valerio Checchi, Pietro Piller Cottrer and Cristian Zorzi. Four teams finished within 2.6 seconds of the Italian winners.

Hosts Italy won this relay, their fifth straight medal in relays in the Winter Olympics. They were over 15 seconds ahead of any competitors. Sweden took bronze, their first medal since 1988, and Norway failed to win a medal for the first time since 1988.

== Results ==
Each team used four skiers, with each completing racing over the same 10 kilometre circuit. The first two raced in the classical style, and the final pair of skiers raced freestyle. The Austrian team was disqualified after the IOC declared all four members permanently ineligible for doping-related violations. This had a minimal effect on the final standings, as the Austrian team had been lapped during the race, ending up last overall.

The race was started at 10:00.

Rank	Bib	Team	Time	Deficit
1st place, gold medalist(s)	4	Italy; Fulvio Valbusa; Giorgio Di Centa; Pietro Piller Cottrer; Cristian Zorzi	1:43:45.7; 25:54.0; 26:50.6; 24:59.1; 26:02.0	—
2nd place, silver medalist(s)	2	Germany; Andreas Schlütter; Jens Filbrich; René Sommerfeldt; Tobias Angerer	1:44:01.4; 25:53.9; 26:50.2; 25:18.9; 25:58.4	+15.7
3rd place, bronze medalist(s)	7	Sweden; Mats Larsson; Johan Olsson; Anders Södergren; Mathias Fredriksson	1:44:01.7; 25:53.4; 26:55.4; 25:00.5; 26:12.4	+16.0
4	6	France; Christophe Perrillat; Alexandre Rousselet; Emmanuel Jonnier; Vincent Vittoz	1:44:22.8; 26:05.4; 26:46.2; 25:47.1; 25:44.1	+37.1
5	1	Norway; Jens Arne Svartedal; Odd-Bjørn Hjelmeset; Frode Estil; Tore Ruud Hofstad	1:44:56.3; 25:53.0; 26:50.8; 25:42.8; 26:29.7	+1:10.6
6	3	Russia; Sergey Novikov; Vasily Rochev; Ivan Alypov; Yevgeny Dementyev	1:45:09.9; 26:03.7; 26:39.8; 25:58.2; 26:28.2	+1:24.2
7	15	Switzerland; Reto Burgermeister; Christian Stebler; Toni Livers; Remo Fischer	1:45:10.9; 26:02.0; 26:50.2; 25:46.4; 26:32.3	+1:25.2
8	9	Estonia; Aivar Rehemaa; Andrus Veerpalu; Jaak Mae; Kaspar Kokk	1:45:23.8; 26:45.7; 26:39.9; 25:32.0; 26:26.2	+1:38.1
9	8	Czech Republic; Martin Koukal; Lukáš Bauer; Jiří Magál; Dušan Kožíšek	1:46:03.3; 26:01.6; 26:41.3; 25:19.6; 28:00.8	+2:17.6
10	12	Finland; Sami Jauhojärvi; Tero Similä; Olli Ohtonen; Teemu Kattilakoski	1:46:36.1; 25:56.1; 27:28.9; 25:53.4; 27:17.7	+2:50.4
11	13	Canada; Devon Kershaw; Sean Crooks; Chris Jeffries; George Grey	1:48:15.9; 25:52.3; 29:30.6; 26:02.3; 26:50.7	+4:30.2
12	11	United States; Kris Freeman; Lars Flora; Andrew Johnson; Carl Swenson	1:48:44.2; 26:03.1; 28:27.8; 26:44.1; 27:29.2	+4:58.5
13	10	Kazakhstan; Andrey Golovko; Dmitrij Eremenko; Maxim Odnodvortsev; Yevgeniy Koschevoy	1:49:03.6; 26:03.5; 27:48.5; 26:18.9; 28:52.7	+5:17.9
14	14	Ukraine; Roman Leybyuk; Vladimir Olschanski; Olexandr Putsko; Mikhail Gumenyak	1:50:01.9; 26:36.7; 28:32.5; 26:28.5; 28:24.2	+6:16.2
15	16	China; Xia Wan; Li Geilang; Zhang Chengye; Zhang Qing	1:50:40.5; 27:27.9; 28:46.3; 26:23.6; 28:02.7	+6:54.8
	5	Austria; Martin Tauber; Jürgen Pinter; Roland Diethart; Johannes Eder	DSQ	
