= Fabio Maj =

Italian cross-country skier

Personal information
- Nationality: Italy
- Born: 16 June 1970 (age 56) Schilpario, Italy

Sport
- Sport: Skiing
- Club: G.S. Forestale

World Cup career
- Seasons: 13 – (1992–2004)
- Indiv. starts: 143
- Indiv. podiums: 4
- Indiv. wins: 2
- Team starts: 36
- Team podiums: 17
- Team wins: 6
- Overall titles: 0 – (6th in 2000)
- Discipline titles: 0
Medal record
Men's cross-country skiing
Representing Italy
Olympic Games
| Silver medal – second place | 1998 Nagano | 4 × 10 km relay |
| Silver medal – second place | 2002 Salt Lake City | 4 × 10 km relay |
World Championships
| Bronze medal – third place | 1995 Thunder Bay | 4 × 10 km relay |
| Bronze medal – third place | 1997 Trondheim | 4 × 10 km relay |

Fabio Maj (born 16 June 1970 in Schilpario) is an Italian cross-country skier who competed from 1992 to 2004. He won two silver medals in the 4 × 10 km relay at the Winter Olympics (1998, 2002). He also finished 13th in the 10 km + 15 km combined pursuit at the 1998 Winter Olympics in Nagano and 13th in the 30 km event at the 2002 Winter Olympics in Salt Lake City which were his best individual Olympic finishes.

Maj also won two bronze medals in the 4 × 10 km relay at the Nordic skiing World Championships (1995, 1999). His best individual finish was seventh in the 30 km at the 2001 event.

== Cross-country skiing results ==
All results are sourced from the International Ski Federation (FIS).

=== Olympic Games ===
- 2 medals – (2 silver)

| Year | Age | 10 km | 15 km | Pursuit | 30 km | 50 km | Sprint | 4 × 10 km relay |
|---|---|---|---|---|---|---|---|---|
| 1998 | 27 | 28 | —N/a | 13 | — | — | —N/a | Silver |
| 2002 | 31 | —N/a | — | 20 | 13 | 14 | — | Silver |

=== World Championships ===
- 2 medals – (2 bronze)

| Year | Age | 10 km | 15 km | Pursuit | 30 km | 50 km | Sprint | 4 × 10 km relay |
|---|---|---|---|---|---|---|---|---|
| 1995 | 24 | — | —N/a | — | 11 | — | —N/a | Bronze |
| 1997 | 26 | — | —N/a | — | — | 17 | —N/a | — |
| 1999 | 28 | 19 | —N/a | 10 | 25 | 11 | —N/a | Bronze |
| 2001 | 30 | —N/a | — | 15 | 7 | — | — | 6 |
| 2003 | 32 | —N/a | 23 | — | 15 | — | — | 10 |

=== World Cup ===
==== Season standings ====
| Season | Age | | | | | |
| Season | Age | Overall | Distance | Long Distance | Middle Distance | Sprint |
|---|---|---|---|---|---|---|
| 1992 | 21 | NC | —N/a | —N/a | —N/a | —N/a |
| 1993 | 22 | 52 | —N/a | —N/a | —N/a | —N/a |
| 1994 | 23 | 44 | —N/a | —N/a | —N/a | —N/a |
| 1995 | 24 | 26 | —N/a | —N/a | —N/a | —N/a |
| 1996 | 25 | 29 | —N/a | —N/a | —N/a | —N/a |
| 1997 | 26 | 23 | —N/a | 23 | —N/a | 20 |
| 1998 | 27 | 11 | —N/a | 7 | —N/a | 19 |
| 1999 | 28 | 18 | —N/a | 22 | —N/a | 15 |
| 2000 | 29 | 6 | —N/a | 7 | 20 | 9 |
| 2001 | 30 | 14 | —N/a | —N/a | —N/a | 22 |
| 2002 | 31 | 23 | —N/a | —N/a | —N/a | 50 |
| 2003 | 32 | 94 | —N/a | —N/a | —N/a | — |
| 2004 | 33 | NC | NC | —N/a | —N/a | — |

==== Individual podiums ====
- 2 victories
- 4 podiums

| No. | Season | Date | Location | Race | Level | Place |
|---|---|---|---|---|---|---|
| 1 | 1997–98 | 3 January 1998 | Kavgolovo, Russia | 30 km Individual F | World Cup | 3rd |
| 2 | 1999–00 | 27 December 1999 | Engelberg, Switzerland | 1.0 km Sprint C | World Cup | 1st |
| 3 | 1999–00 | 4 March 2000 | Lahti, Finland | 30 km Mass Start C | World Cup | 2nd |
| 4 | 2001–02 | 12 January 2002 | Nové Město, Czech Republic | 10 km Individual F | World Cup | 1st |

==== Team podiums ====
- 6 victories – (4 RL, 2 TS)
- 17 podiums – (15 RL, 2 TS)

| No. | Season | Date | Location | Race | Level | Place | Teammate(s) |
|---|---|---|---|---|---|---|---|
| 1 | 1994–95 | 15 January 1995 | Nové Město, Czech Republic | 4 × 10 km Relay C | World Cup | 3rd | Fauner / Godioz / Albarello |
| 2 | 1994–95 | 17 March 1995 | Thunder Bay, Canada | 4 × 10 km Relay C/F | World Championships^{[1]} | 3rd | Valbusa / Albarello / Fauner |
| 3 | 1994–95 | 26 March 1995 | Sapporo, Japan | 4 × 10 km Relay C/F | World Cup | 2nd | Albarello / Fauner / Godioz |
| 4 | 1995–96 | 14 January 1996 | Nové Město, Czech Republic | 4 × 10 km Relay C | World Cup | 3rd | Vanzetta / Valbusa / Godioz |
| 5 | 1995–96 | 1 March 1996 | Lahti, Finland | 4 × 10 km Relay C/F | World Cup | 1st | Albarello / Fauner / Valbusa |
| 6 | 1996–97 | 24 November 1996 | Kiruna, Sweden | 4 × 10 km Relay C | World Cup | 2nd | Fauner / Piller / Valbusa |
| 7 | 1997–98 | 7 December 1997 | Santa Caterina, Italy | 4 × 10 km Relay F | World Cup | 2nd | Fauner / Piller Cottrer / De Zolt Ponte |
| 8 | 1997–98 | 11 January 1998 | Ramsau, Austria | 4 × 10 km Relay C/F | World Cup | 1st | Valbusa / Piller Cottrer / Fauner |
| 9 | 1998–99 | 29 November 1998 | Muonio, Finland | 4 × 10 km Relay F | World Cup | 3rd | Fauner / Piller Cottrer / Pozzi |
| 10 | 1998–99 | 10 January 1999 | Nové Město, Czech Republic | 4 × 10 km Relay C/F | World Cup | 2nd | Valbusa / Piller Cottrer / Fauner |
| 11 | 1998–99 | 26 February 1999 | Ramsau, Austria | 4 × 10 km Relay C/F | World Championships^{[1]} | 3rd | Di Centa / Valbusa / Fauner |
| 12 | 1998–99 | 21 March 1999 | Oslo, Norway | 4 × 10 km Relay C | World Cup | 3rd | Fauner / Di Centa / Valbusa |
| 13 | 1999–00 | 28 November 1999 | Kiruna, Sweden | 4 × 10 km Relay F | World Cup | 1st | Valbusa / Pozzi / Fauner |
| 14 | 1999–00 | 27 February 2000 | Falun, Sweden | 4 x 10 km Relay F | World Cup | 1st | Valbusa / Piller Cottrer / Zorzi |
| 15 | 2000–01 | 13 December 2000 | Clusone, Italy | 10 × 1.5 km Team Sprint F | World Cup | 1st | Valbusa |
| 16 | 2000–01 | 18 March 2001 | Falun, Sweden | 4 × 10 km Relay C/F | World Cup | 3rd | Fauner / Piller Cottrer / Zorzi |
| 17 | 2001–02 | 13 January 2002 | Nové Město, Czech Republic | 6 × 1.5 km Team Sprint F | World Cup | 1st | Schwienbacher |

Note: ^{1} Until the 1999 World Championships, World Championship races were included in the World Cup scoring system.
