= Andrej Pátricka =

Slovak cross-country skier (born 1975)

Personal information
- Nationality: Slovak
- Born: 19 September 1975 (age 49); Kremnica, Czechoslovakia

Sport
- Sport: Cross-country skiing

Andrej Pátricka (born 19 September 1975) is a Slovak cross-country skier. He competed in the men's relay event at the 1998 Winter Olympics.
