= 1996–97 FIS Cross-Country World Cup =

Cross-country skiing competition

Discipline	Men	Women
Overall	(Norway) Bjørn Dæhlie (5th title)	(Russia) Yelena Välbe (5th title)
Long Distance	(Finland) Mika Myllylä	(Russia) Yelena Välbe
Sprint	(Norway) Bjørn Dæhlie	(Italy) Stefania Belmondo
Nations Cup	Norway	Russia
- Nations Cup Overall: Norway

Competition
Locations	11 venues	11 venues
Individual	15 events	15 events
Relay/Team	6 events	7 events

The 1996–97 FIS Cross-Country World Cup was the 16th official World Cup season in cross-country skiing for men and women. The season began in Kiruna, Sweden, on 23 November 1996 and finished in Holmenkollen, Oslo, Norway, on 15 March 1997. Bjørn Dæhlie of Norway won the overall men's cup, and Yelena Välbe of Russia won the women's. Both skiers won their fifth overall World Cup.

== Calendar ==
=== Men ===
C – Classic / F – Freestyle
WC	Date	Place	Discipline	Winner	Second	Third	Ref.
1	23 November 1996	(Sweden) Kiruna	10 km F	(Norway) Bjørn Dæhlie	(Finland) Jari Isometsä	(Norway) Kristen Skjeldal	
2	7 December 1996	(Switzerland) Davos	10 km C	(Finland) Mika Myllylä	(Norway) Erling Jevne	(Italy) Fulvio Valbusa	
3	14 December 1996	(Italy) Brusson	15 km F	(Norway) Bjørn Dæhlie	(Italy) Fulvio Valbusa	(Norway) Kristen Skjeldal	
4	18 December 1996	(Germany) Oberstdorf	30 km C	(Norway) Bjørn Dæhlie	(Norway) Erling Jevne	(Norway) Sture Sivertsen	
5	4 January 1997	(Russia) Kavgolovo	30 km F	(Finland) Mika Myllylä	(Italy) Fulvio Valbusa	(Italy) Maurizio Pozzi	
6	11 January 1997	(Japan) Hakuba	10 km C	(Italy) Silvio Fauner	(Norway) Erling Jevne	(Finland) Jari Isometsä	
7	12 January 1997	(Japan) Hakuba	15 km F Pursuit	(Italy) Silvio Fauner	(Italy) Giorgio Di Centa	(Finland) Jari Isometsä	
8	19 January 1997	(Finland) Lahti	30 km C	(Kazakhstan) Vladimir Smirnov	(Finland) Mika Myllylä	(Sweden) Henrik Forsberg	
FIS Nordic World Ski Championships (21 February–2 March)
9	21 February 1997	(Norway) Trondheim	30 km F	(Russia) Alexey Prokurorov	(Norway) Bjørn Dæhlie	(Norway) Thomas Alsgaard	
10	24 February 1997	(Norway) Trondheim	10 km C	(Norway) Bjørn Dæhlie	(Russia) Alexey Prokurorov	(Finland) Mika Myllylä	
11	25 February 1997	(Norway) Trondheim	15 km F Pursuit	(Norway) Bjørn Dæhlie	(Finland) Mika Myllylä	(Russia) Alexey Prokurorov	
12	2 March 1997	(Norway) Trondheim	50 km C	(Finland) Mika Myllylä	(Norway) Erling Jevne	(Norway) Bjørn Dæhlie	
13	8 March 1997	(Sweden) Falun	15 km C	(Norway) Bjørn Dæhlie	(Norway) Sture Sivertsen	(Norway) Erling Jevne	
14	11 March 1997	(Sweden) Sunne	Sprint F	(Norway) Bjørn Dæhlie	(Norway) Tore Bjonviken	(Sweden) Mathias Fredriksson	
15	15 March 1997	(Norway) Oslo	50 km F	(Italy) Pietro Piller Cottrer	(Norway) Tor Arne Hetland	(Norway) Bjørn Dæhlie	

Note: Until FIS Nordic World Ski Championships 1999, World Championship races are part of the World Cup. Hence results from those races are included in the World Cup overall.

=== Women ===
C – Classic / F – Freestyle
WC	Date	Place	Discipline	Winner	Second	Third	Ref.
1	23 November 1996	(Sweden) Kiruna	5 km F	(Russia) Yelena Välbe	(Italy) Stefania Belmondo	(Russia) Nina Gavrylyuk	
2	7 December 1996	(Switzerland) Davos	10 km C	(Italy) Stefania Belmondo	(Russia) Yelena Välbe	(Russia) Nina Gavrylyuk	
3	14 December 1996	(Italy) Brusson	15 km F	(Italy) Stefania Belmondo	(Russia) Yelena Välbe	(Russia) Nina Gavrylyuk	
4	18 December 1996	(Germany) Oberstdorf	10 km C	(Norway) Trude Dybendahl	(Norway) Bente Martinsen	(Norway) Anita Moen	
5	5 January 1997	(Russia) Kavgolovo	15 km F	(Russia) Yelena Välbe	(Russia) Larisa Lazutina	(Russia) Lyubov Yegorova	
6	11 January 1997	(Japan) Hakuba	5 km C	(Italy) Stefania Belmondo	(Czech Republic) Kateřina Neumannová	(Russia) Yelena Välbe	
7	12 January 1997	(Japan) Hakuba	10 km F Pursuit	(Italy) Stefania Belmondo	(Czech Republic) Kateřina Neumannová	(Russia) Yelena Välbe	
8	18 January 1997	(Finland) Lahti	15 km C	(Norway) Marit Mikkelsplass	(Russia) Yelena Välbe	(Italy) Stefania Belmondo	
FIS Nordic World Ski Championships (21 February–2 March)
9	21 February 1997	(Norway) Trondheim	15 km F	(Russia) Yelena Välbe	(Italy) Stefania Belmondo	(Czech Republic) Kateřina Neumannová	
10	23 February 1997	(Norway) Trondheim	5 km C	(Russia) Yelena Välbe	(Italy) Stefania Belmondo	(Russia) Olga Danilova	
11	24 February 1997	(Norway) Trondheim	10 km F Pursuit	(Russia) Yelena Välbe	(Italy) Stefania Belmondo	(Russia) Nina Gavrylyuk	
12	1 March 1997	(Norway) Trondheim	30 km C	(Russia) Yelena Välbe	(Italy) Stefania Belmondo	(Norway) Marit Mikkelsplass	
13	8 March 1997	(Sweden) Falun	5 km F	(Russia) Yelena Välbe	(Italy) Stefania Belmondo	(Czech Republic) Kateřina Neumannová	
14	11 March 1997	(Sweden) Sunne	Sprint F	(Norway) Trude Dybendahl	(Russia) Yelena Välbe	(Norway) Bente Martinsen	
15	15 March 1997	(Norway) Oslo	30 km F	(Italy) Stefania Belmondo	(Russia) Yelena Välbe	(Norway) Elin Nilsen	

Note: Until FIS Nordic World Ski Championships 1999, World Championship races are part of the World Cup. Hence results from those races are included in the World Cup overall.

=== Men's team ===
WC	Date	Place	Discipline	Winner	Second	Third	Ref.
1	24 November 1996	(Sweden) Kiruna	4 × 10 km relay C	Finland I Sami Repo; Harri Kirvesniemi; Mika Myllylä; Jari Isometsä	Italy I Fabio Maj; Silvio Fauner; Sergio Piller; Fulvio Valbusa	Norway I Kristen Skjeldal; Anders Eide; Vegard Ulvang; Bjørn Dæhlie	
2	8 December 1996	(Switzerland) Davos	4 × 10 km relay C	Finland I Jari Isometsä; Sami Repo; Harri Kirvesniemi; Mika Myllylä	Sweden Mathias Fredriksson; Anders Bergström; Niklas Jonsson; Henrik Forsberg	Norway I Kristen Skjeldal; Vegard Ulvang; Anders Eide; Sture Sivertsen	
3	15 December 1996	(Italy) Brusson	4 × 10 km relay F	Norway Egil Kristiansen; Anders Eide; Kristen Skjeldal; Bjørn Dæhlie	Italy Maurizio Pozzi; Fulvio Valbusa; Gaudenzio Godioz; Silvio Fauner	Sweden Mathias Fredriksson; Anders Bergström; Niklas Jonsson; Torgny Mogren	
4	18 January 1997	(Finland) Lahti	Team Sprint F	Italy Maurizio Pozzi; Giorgio Di Centa	Finland I Ari Palolahti; Jari Räsänen	Sweden Magnus Ingesson; Håkan Nordbäck	
5	28 February 1997	(Norway) Trondheim	4 × 10 km relay C/F	Norway Sture Sivertsen; Erling Jevne; Bjørn Dæhlie; Thomas Alsgaard	Finland Harri Kirvesniemi; Mika Myllylä; Jari Räsänen; Jari Isometsä	Italy Giorgio Di Centa; Silvio Fauner; Pietro Piller Cottrer; Fulvio Valbusa	
6	9 March 1997	(Sweden) Falun	4 × 10 km relay C/F	Norway I Sture Sivertsen; Erling Jevne; Kristen Skjeldal; Bjørn Dæhlie	Norway II Odd-Bjørn Hjelmeset; Øyvind Skaanes; Krister Sørgård; Thomas Alsgaard	Sweden I Mathias Fredriksson; Henrik Forsberg; Torgny Mogren; Anders Bergström	

=== Women's team ===
WC	Date	Place	Discipline	Winner	Second	Third	Ref.
1	24 November 1996	(Sweden) Kiruna	4 × 5 km relay C	Russia I Nina Gavrylyuk; Larisa Lazutina; Lyubov Yegorova; Yelena Välbe	Norway I Trude Dybendahl; Marit Mikkelsplass; Anita Moen; Bente Martinsen	Russia II Svetlana Nageykina; Olga Zavyalova; Yuliya Chepalova; Olga Danilova	
2	8 December 1996	(Switzerland) Davos	4 × 5 km relay C	Norway I Bente Martinsen; Anita Moen; Marit Mikkelsplass; Trude Dybendahl	Russia I Nina Gavrylyuk; Larisa Lazutina; Lyubov Yegorova; Yelena Välbe	Russia II Natalya Baranova-Masalkina; Svetlana Nageykina; Yuliya Chepalova; Olga Danilova	
3	15 December 1996	(Italy) Brusson	4 × 5 km relay F	Russia I Nina Gavrylyuk; Olga Danilova; Lyubov Yegorova; Yelena Välbe	Russia II Olga Zavyalova; Svetlana Nageykina; Larisa Lazutina; Yuliya Chepalova	Italy Gabriella Paruzzi; Sabina Valbusa; Guidina Dal Sasso; Stefania Belmondo	
4	18 January 1997	(Finland) Lahti	Team Sprint F	Italy I Sabina Valbusa; Stefania Belmondo	Russia I Nina Gavrylyuk; Yelena Välbe	Norway I Anita Moen; Trude Dybendahl	
5	28 February 1997	(Norway) Trondheim	4 × 5 km relay C/F	Russia Olga Danilova; Larisa Lazutina; Nina Gavrylyuk; Yelena Välbe	Norway Bente Martinsen; Marit Mikkelsplass; Elin Nilsen; Trude Dybendahl	Finland Riikka Sirviö; Tuulikki Pyykkönen; Kati Pulkkinen; Satu Salonen	
6	9 March 1997	(Sweden) Falun	4 × 5 km relay C/F	Russia I Olga Danilova; Larisa Lazutina; Nina Gavrylyuk; Yelena Välbe	Norway Bente Martinsen; Trude Dybendahl; Elin Nilsen; Maj Helen Sorkmo	Finland Tuulikki Pyykkönen; Riikka Sirviö; Kati Pulkkinen; Satu Salonen	
7	16 March 1997	(Norway) Oslo	4 × 5 km relay F	Russia I Olga Danilova; Nina Gavrylyuk; Svetlana Nageykina; Yelena Välbe	Norway I Anita Moen; Elin Nilsen; Marit Mikkelsplass; Trude Dybendahl	Italy Gabriella Paruzzi; Lara Peyrot; Sabina Valbusa; Stefania Belmondo	

== Men's standings ==
=== Overall ===
Rank	after all 15 events	Points
1	(Norway) Bjørn Dæhlie	845
2	(Finland) Mika Myllylä	580
3	(Italy) Fulvio Valbusa	523
4	(Norway) Erling Jevne	488
5	(Italy) Silvio Fauner	447
6	(Finland) Jari Isometsä	363
7	(Norway) Kristen Skjeldal	351
8	(Norway) Sture Sivertsen	345
9	(Kazakhstan) Vladimir Smirnov	309
10	(Russia) Alexey Prokurorov	290

=== Long Distance ===
Rank	after all events	Points
1	(Finland) Mika Myllylä	235
2	(Norway) Bjørn Dæhlie	210
3	(Kazakhstan) Vladimir Smirnov	193
4	(Italy) Pietro Piller Cottrer	124
5	(Norway) Erling Jevne	116
6	(Sweden) Mathias Fredriksson	106
7	(Italy) Fulvio Valbusa	102
8	(Norway) Sture Sivertsen	100
9	(Russia) Alexey Prokurorov	93
10	(Italy) Maurizio Pozzi	82

=== Sprint ===
Rank	after all events	Points
1	(Norway) Bjørn Dæhlie	448
2	(Italy) Fulvio Valbusa	335
3	(Italy) Silvio Fauner	320
4	(Norway) Erling Jevne	256
5	(Norway) Kristen Skjeldal	241
6	(Finland) Jari Isometsä	238
7	(Finland) Mika Myllylä	165
8	(Norway) Sture Sivertsen	155
9	(Finland) Sami Repo	140
10	(Sweden) Henrik Forsberg	137

== Women's standings ==
=== Overall ===
Rank	after all 15 events	Points
1	(Russia) Yelena Välbe	940
2	(Italy) Stefania Belmondo	909
3	(Czech Republic) Kateřina Neumannová	525
4	(Russia) Nina Gavrylyuk	518
5	(Russia) Olga Danilova	414
6	(Norway) Bente Martinsen	391
7	(Norway) Marit Mikkelsplass	367
8	(Russia) Larisa Lazutina	366
9	(Norway) Trude Dybendahl	334
10	(Russia) Lyubov Yegorova	271

=== Long Distance ===
Rank	after all events	Points
1	(Russia) Yelena Välbe	340
2	(Italy) Stefania Belmondo	280
3	(Russia) Nina Gavrylyuk	205
4	(Norway) Marit Mikkelsplass	167
5	(Russia) Olga Danilova	162
6	(Russia) Larisa Lazutina	136
7	(Norway) Elin Nilsen	109
8	(Czech Republic) Kateřina Neumannová	99
9	(Russia) Lyubov Yegorova	96
10	(Norway) Bente Martinsen	95

=== Sprint ===
Rank	after all events	Points
1	(Italy) Stefania Belmondo	489
2	(Russia) Yelena Välbe	472
3	(Czech Republic) Kateřina Neumannová	321
4	(Norway) Bente Martinsen	232
5	(Norway) Trude Dybendahl	225
6	(Russia) Nina Gavrylyuk	203
7	(Japan) Fumiko Aoki	162
8	(Russia) Olga Danilova	142
9	(Russia) Lyubov Yegorova	135
10	(Russia) Larisa Lazutina	130

== Achievements ==
Victories in this World Cup (all-time number of victories as of 1996/97 season in parentheses)

Men

- Bjørn Dæhlie (NOR), 7 (37) first places
- Mika Myllylä (FIN), 3 (3) first places
- Silvio Fauner (ITA), 2 (3) first places
- Vladimir Smirnov (KAZ), 1 (29) first place
- Alexey Prokurorov (RUS), 1 (8) first place
- Pietro Piller Cottrer (ITA), 1 (1) first place

Women

- Yelena Välbe (RUS), 7 (44) first places
- Stefania Belmondo (ITA), 5 (15) first places
- Trude Dybendahl (NOR), 2 (6) first places
- Marit Mikkelsplass (NOR), 1 (1) first place
