= 2000–01 FIS Cross-Country World Cup =

Cross-country skiing competition

Discipline	Men	Women
Overall	(Sweden) Per Elofsson	(Russia) Yuliya Chepalova
Distance	(not arranged)	(not arranged)
Sprint	(Norway) Jan Jacob Verdenius	(Norway) Bente Skari
Nations Cup	Norway	Russia
- Nations Cup Overall: Norway

Competition
Locations	15 venues	15 venues
Individual	20 events	20 events
Relay/Team	4 events	4 events

The 2000–01 FIS Cross-Country World Cup was the 20th official World Cup in cross-country skiing. It started in Beitostølen, Norway on 25 November 2000 and finished in Kuopio, Finland on 25 March 2001. Per Elofsson of Sweden won the overall men's cup, and Yuliya Chepalova of Russia won the women's.

== Calendar ==
=== Men ===
Key: C – Classic / F – Freestyle
WC	Date	Place	Discipline	Winner	Second	Third	Yellow bib	Ref.
1	25 November 2000	(Norway) Beitostølen	15 km C	(Norway) Odd-Bjørn Hjelmeset	(Norway) Thomas Alsgaard	(Norway) Tore Bjonviken	(Norway) Odd-Bjørn Hjelmeset	
2	29 November 2000	(Norway) Beitostølen	10 km F	(Sweden) Per Elofsson	(Finland) Sami Repo	(Norway) Thomas Alsgaard	(Norway) Thomas Alsgaard	
3	8 December 2000	(Italy) Santa Caterina	15 km F	(Sweden) Per Elofsson	(France) Vincent Vittoz	(Norway) Tor Arne Hetland	(Sweden) Per Elofsson	
4	16 December 2000	(Italy) Brusson	20 km Skiathlon	(Sweden) Per Elofsson	(Spain) Johann Mühlegg	(France) Vincent Vittoz	(Sweden) Per Elofsson	
5	17 December 2000	(Italy) Brusson	Sprint F	(Norway) Thomas Alsgaard	(Norway) Jan Jacob Verdenius	(Italy) Cristian Zorzi		
6	20 December 2000	(Switzerland) Davos	30 km C	(Finland) Mika Myllylä	(Russia) Mikhail Ivanov	(Norway) Odd-Bjørn Hjelmeset		
7	28 December 2000	(Switzerland) Engelberg	Sprint C	(Norway) Jan Jacob Verdenius	(Norway) Tor Arne Hetland	(Italy) Giorgio Di Centa		
8	29 December 2000	(Switzerland) Engelberg	Sprint F	(Norway) Tor Arne Hetland	(Italy) Cristian Zorzi	(Norway) Håvard Solbakken		
9	10 January 2001	(United States) Soldier Hollow	30 km F Mass Start	(Spain) Johann Mühlegg	(Austria) Christian Hoffmann	(Germany) René Sommerfeldt		
10	13 January 2001	(United States) Soldier Hollow	15 km C	(Spain) Johann Mühlegg	(Austria) Mikhail Botvinov	(Italy) Fulvio Valbusa		
11	14 January 2001	(United States) Soldier Hollow	Sprint F	(Italy) Cristian Zorzi	(Sweden) Thobias Fredriksson	(Italy) Silvio Fauner		
12	1 February 2001	(Italy) Asiago	Sprint C	(Norway) Odd-Bjørn Hjelmeset	(Norway) Trond Iversen	(Norway) Jens Arne Svartedal		
13	4 February 2001	(Czech Republic) Nové Město	Sprint F	(Norway) Morten Brørs	(Norway) Trond Einar Elden	(Finland) Ari Palolahti		
14	10 February 2001	(Estonia) Otepää	10 km C	(Norway) Thomas Alsgaard	(Sweden) Per Elofsson	(Finland) Janne Immonen		
FIS Nordic World Ski Championships 2001 (15–25 February)
15	4 March 2001	(Russia) Kavgolovo	15 km F	(Sweden) Per Elofsson	(Austria) Mikhail Botvinov	(Russia) Alexey Prokourorov		
16	7 March 2001	(Norway) Oslo	Sprint C	(Norway) Thomas Alsgaard	(Norway) Thoralf Heimdal	(Norway) Jan Jacob Verdenius		
17	10 March 2001	(Norway) Oslo	50 km C	(Sweden) Per Elofsson	(Norway) Anders Aukland	(Norway) Frode Estil		
18	14 March 2001	(Sweden) Borlänge	10 km F	(Sweden) Per Elofsson	(Italy) Pietro Piller Cottrer	(Spain) Johann Mühlegg		
19	17 March 2001	(Sweden) Falun	15 km C	(Russia) Mikhail Ivanov	(Norway) Frode Estil	(Norway) Tore Bjonviken (Norway) Kristen Skjeldal	(Sweden) Per Elofsson	
20	25 March 2001	(Finland) Kuopio	60 km F	(Belarus) Sergey Dolidovich	(Italy) Pietro Piller Cottrer	(Austria) Mikhail Botvinov	(Sweden) Per Elofsson	

=== Women ===
Key: C – Classic / F – Freestyle
WC	Date	Place	Discipline	Winner	Second	Third	Yellow bib	Ref.
1	25 November 2000	(Norway) Beitostølen	10 km C	(Norway) Bente Skari	(Finland) Kaisa Varis	(Italy) Stefania Belmondo	(Norway) Bente Skari	
2	29 November 2000	(Norway) Beitostølen	5 km F	(Finland) Kaisa Varis	(Italy) Stefania Belmondo	(Estonia) Kristina Šmigun	(Finland) Kaisa Varis	
3	8 December 2000	(Italy) Santa Caterina	10 km F	(Russia) Yuliya Chepalova	(Italy) Stefania Belmondo	(Russia) Larisa Lazutina	(Italy) Stefania Belmondo	
4	16 December 2000	(Italy) Brusson	10 km C	(Norway) Bente Skari	(Russia) Olga Danilova	(Russia) Larisa Lazutina	(Italy) Stefania Belmondo	
5	17 December 2000	(Italy) Brusson	Sprint F	(Finland) Pirjo Manninen	(Czech Republic) Katerina Neumannova	(Finland) Virpi Kuitunen	(Russia) Yuliya Chepalova	
6	20 December 2000	(Switzerland) Davos	15 km C	(Russia) Yuliya Chepalova	(Norway) Bente Skari	(Estonia) Kristina Šmigun	(Russia) Yuliya Chepalova	
7	28 December 2000	(Switzerland) Engelberg	Sprint C	(Norway) Bente Skari	(Finland) Pirjo Manninen	(Russia) Nina Gavrylyuk	(Norway) Bente Skari	
8	29 December 2000	(Switzerland) Engelberg	Sprint F	(Finland) Pirjo Manninen	(Russia) Yuliya Chepalova	(Italy) Stefania Belmondo	(Russia) Yuliya Chepalova	
9	10 January 2001	(United States) Soldier Hollow	10 km Skiathlon	(Czech Republic) Kateřina Neumannová	(Italy) Gabriella Paruzzi	(Italy) Stefania Belmondo	(Russia) Yuliya Chepalova	
10	14 January 2001	(United States) Soldier Hollow	Sprint F	(Norway) Bente Skari	(Germany) Manuela Henkel	(Canada) Beckie Scott	(Norway) Bente Skari	
11	1 February 2001	(Italy) Asiago	Sprint C	(Norway) Bente Skari	(Norway) Anita Moen	(Slovenia) Petra Majdič	(Norway) Bente Skari	
12	4 February 2001	(Czech Republic) Nové Město	Sprint F	(Russia) Yuliya Chepalova	(Norway) Anita Moen	(Germany) Claudia Künzel	(Norway) Bente Skari	
13	10 February 2001	(Estonia) Otepää	5 km C	(Norway) Bente Skari	(Finland) Virpi Kuitunen	(Russia) Olga Danilova	(Norway) Bente Skari	
FIS Nordic World Ski Championships 2001 (15–25 February)
14	4 March 2001	(Russia) Kavgolovo	15 km F	(Russia) Yuliya Chepalova	(Russia) Larisa Lazutina	(Italy) Stefania Belmondo	(Norway) Bente Skari	
15	7 March 2001	(Norway) Oslo	Sprint C	(Finland) Pirjo Manninen	(Norway) Bente Skari	(Sweden) Lina Andersson	(Norway) Bente Skari	
16	10 March 2001	(Norway) Oslo	30 km C	(Russia) Larisa Lazutina	(Norway) Bente Skari	(Russia) Olga Zavyalova	(Norway) Bente Skari	
17	14 March 2001	(Sweden) Borlänge	5 km F	(Russia) Yuliya Chepalova	(Russia) Yelena Burukhina	(Russia) Larisa Lazutina	(Norway) Bente Skari	
18	17 March 2001	(Sweden) Falun	10 km F	(Russia) Yuliya Chepalova	(Russia) Larisa Lazutina	(Russia) Olga Zavyalova	(Russia) Yuliya Chepalova	
19	18 March 2001	(Sweden) Falun	10 km C	(Russia) Larisa Lazutina	(Norway) Bente Skari	(Russia) Yuliya Chepalova	(Russia) Yuliya Chepalova	
20	24 March 2001	(Finland) Kuopio	40 km F	(Russia) Yuliya Chepalova	(Russia) Olga Zavyalova	(Russia) Larisa Lazutina	(Russia) Yuliya Chepalova	

=== Men's team ===
WC	Date	Place	Discipline	Winner	Second	Third	Ref.
1	26 November 2000	(Norway) Beitostølen	4 × 10 km relay C/F	Norway I Tore Bjonviken; Odd-Bjørn Hjelmeset; Kristen Skjeldal; Tor Arne Hetland	Finland Janne Immonen; Harri Kirvesniemi; Mika Myllylä; Sami Repo	Norway II Krister Sørgård; Anders Aukland; Hans Leithe; Espen Bjervig	
2	9 December 2000	(Italy) Santa Caterina	4 × 10 km relay C/F	Norway Frode Estil; Kristen Skjeldal; Tor Arne Hetland; Thomas Alsgaard	Austria Gerhard Urain; Mikhail Botvinov; Achim Walcher; Christian Hoffmann	Russia Vitaly Denisov; Mikhail Ivanov; Nikolay Bolshakov; Vladimir Vilisov	
3	13 December 2000	(Italy) Clusone	Team Sprint F	Italy I Fulvio Valbusa; Fabio Maj	Italy II Giorgio Di Centa; Cristian Zorzi	Germany René Sommerfeldt; Peter Schlickenrieder	
4	18 March 2001	(Sweden) Falun	4 × 10 km relay C/F	Russia Vitaly Denisov; Mikhail Ivanov; Nikolay Bolshakov; Vladimir Vilisov	Sweden Urban Lindgren; Mathias Fredriksson; Morgan Göransson; Per Elofsson	Italy Silvio Fauner; Fabio Maj; Pietro Piller Cottrer; Cristian Zorzi	

=== Women's team ===
WC	Date	Place	Discipline	Winner	Second	Third	Ref.
1	26 November 2000	(Norway) Beitostølen	4 × 5 km relay C/F	Finland Pirjo Manninen; Milla Jauho; Virpi Kuitunen; Kaisa Varis	Russia Olga Danilova; Lyubov Yegorova; Larisa Lazutina; Yuliya Chepalova	Sweden Lina Andersson; Karin Öhman; Carin Holmberg; Mariana Handler	
2	8 December 2000	(Italy) Santa Caterina	4 × 5 km relay C/F	Russia Nina Gavrylyuk; Olga Zavyalova; Larisa Lazutina; Yuliya Chepalova	Norway Tina Bay; Bente Skari; Elin Nilsen; Hilde G. Pedersen	Finland Pirjo Manninen; Satu Salonen; Virpi Kuitunen; Milla Jauho	
3	13 December 2000	(Italy) Clusone	Team Sprint F	Russia I Olga Zavyalova; Yuliya Chepalova	Italy Sabina Valbusa; Stefania Belmondo	Russia III Irina Skladneva; Olga Moskalenko	
4	13 January 2001	(United States) Soldier Hollow	4 × 5 km relay C/F	Italy Sabina Valbusa; Gabriella Paruzzi; Cristina Paluselli; Stefania Belmondo	Canada Sara Renner; Milaine Theriault; Beckie Scott; Amanda Fortier	Finland Mari Rauhala; Kirsi Välimaa; Riikka Sirviö; Aino-Kaisa Saarinen	

== Men's standings ==
=== Overall ===
Rank	Skier	Points
	(Sweden) Per Elofsson	763
2	(Spain) Johann Mühlegg	603
3	(Norway) Thomas Alsgaard	474
4	(Italy) Pietro Piller Cottrer	456
5	(Norway) Odd-Bjørn Hjelmeset	439
6	(Germany) René Sommerfeldt	384
7	(Italy) Fulvio Valbusa	378
8	(Norway) Frode Estil	370
9	(Norway) Kristen Skjeldal	363
10	(Austria) Mikhail Botvinov	346

Rank	Skier	Points
11	(Italy) Cristian Zorzi	331
12	(Norway) Tor Arne Hetland	330
13	(Sweden) Mathias Fredriksson	298
14	(Italy) Fabio Maj	288
15	(Russia) Mikhail Ivanov	272
16	(France) Vincent Vittoz	264
	(Italy) Giorgio Di Centa	264
18	(Norway) Jan Jacob Verdenius	263
19	(Austria) Christian Hoffmann	253
20	(Norway) Tore Bjonviken	246

Rank	Skier	Points
21	(Norway) Morten Brørs	238
22	(Norway) Anders Aukland	228
23	(Finland) Sami Repo	218
24	(Germany) Axel Teichmann	208
25	(Italy) Silvio Fauner	186
26	(Slovakia) Ivan Bátory	184
27	(Norway) Trond Einar Elden	180
28	(Russia) Vladimir Vilisov	171
29	(Russia) Alexey Prokourorov	169
30	(Austria) Gerhard Urain	167

=== Sprint ===
Rank	Skier	Points
	(Norway) Jan Jacob Verdenius	321
2	(Italy) Cristian Zorzi	288
3	(Norway) Tor Arne Hetland	239
4	(Norway) Morten Brørs	214
5	(Norway) Trond Einar Elden	212
6	(Norway) Thomas Alsgaard	200
7	(Norway) Håvard Bjerkeli	177
8	(Sweden) Thobias Fredriksson	161
9	(Italy) Fulvio Valbusa	154
10	(Norway) Håvard Solbakken	152

== Women's standings ==
=== Overall ===
Rank	Skier	Points
	(Russia) Yuliya Chepalova	1106
2	(Norway) Bente Skari	990
3	(Russia) Larisa Lazutina	893
4	(Italy) Stefania Belmondo	785
5	(Russia) Olga Zavyalova	529
6	(Italy) Gabriella Paruzzi	528
7	(Russia) Olga Danilova	502
8	(Russia) Nina Gavrylyuk	481
9	(Czech Republic) Kateřina Neumannová	435
10	(Estonia) Kristina Šmigun	352

Rank	Skier	Points
11	(Finland) Pirjo Manninen	350
12	(Finland) Kaisa Varis	337
13	(Italy) Sabina Valbusa	306
14	(Norway) Hilde G. Pedersen	280
15	(Canada) Beckie Scott	248
16	—N/a	—N/a
17	(Norway) Anita Moen	230
18	(Finland) Virpi Kuitunen	227
19	(Germany) Manuela Henkel	224
20	(Finland) Kati Venäläinen	235

Rank	Skier	Points
21	(Russia) Yelena Burukhina	195
22	(Russia) Lyubov Yegorova	188
23	(Germany) Claudia Künzel	166
24	(Ukraine) Iryna Taranenko-Terelya	145
25	(Finland) Riikka Sirviö	138
26	(Russia) Ekaterina Stchastlivaia	137
27	(Finland) Milla Jauho	131
28	(Italy) Karin Moroder	117
	(Finland) Aino-Kaisa Saarinen	117
30	(Italy) Cristina Paluselli	116

=== Sprint ===
Rank	Skier	Points
	(Norway) Bente Skari	430
2	(Finland) Pirjo Manninen	380
3	(Germany) Manuela Henkel	259
4	(Russia) Yuliya Chepalova	256
	(Norway) Anita Moen	256
6	(Italy) Gabriella Paruzzi	185
7	(Italy) Stefania Belmondo	164
8	(Italy) Karin Moroder	161
9	(Germany) Claudia Künzel	139
10	(Finland) Elina Hietamäki	136

== Achievements ==
Victories in this World Cup (all-time number of victories as of 2000–01 season in parentheses)

Men

- Per Elofsson (SWE), 6 (7) first places
- Thomas Alsgaard (NOR), 3 (10) first places
- Johann Mühlegg (ESP), 2 (6) first places
- Odd-Bjørn Hjelmeset (NOR), 2 (5) first places
- Mika Myllylä (FIN), 1 (10) first place
- Tor Arne Hetland (NOR), 1 (4) first place
- Cristian Zorzi (ITA), 1 (2) first place
- Jan Jacob Verdenius (NOR), 1 (1) first place
- Morten Brørs (NOR), 1 (2) first place
- Mikhail Ivanov (RUS), 1 (2) first place
- Sergey Dolidovich (BLR), 1 (1) first place

Women

- Yuliya Chepalova (RUS), 7 (11) first places
- Bente Skari (NOR), 6 (21) first places
- Pirjo Manninen (FIN), 3 (3) first places
- Larisa Lazutina (RUS), 2 (21) first places
- Kaisa Varis (FIN), 1 (2) first place
- Kateřina Neumannová (CZE), 1 (4) first place
