= Cross-country skiing at the 1998 Winter Olympics – Men's 4 × 10 kilometre relay =

Men's 4 × 10 kilometre relay at the XVIII Olympic Winter Games
- Venue: Snow Harp
- Dates: 18 February 1998
- Competitors: 80 from 20 nations
- Winning time: 1:40:55.7

Medalists
1st place, gold medalist(s)		Sture Sivertsen; Erling Jevne; Bjørn Dæhlie; Thomas Alsgaard	Norway
2nd place, silver medalist(s)		Marco Albarello; Fulvio Valbusa; Fabio Maj; Silvio Fauner	Italy
3rd place, bronze medalist(s)		Harri Kirvesniemi; Mika Myllylä; Sami Repo; Jari Isometsä	Finland

The men's 4 × 10 kilometre relay cross-country skiing competition at the 1998 Winter Olympics in Nagano, Japan, was held on 18 February at Snow Harp.

== Race summary ==
The opening leg in Nagano was a surprise with Germany leading, and Norway in 10th place, as Sture Sivertsen hit the wall at eight kilometers. After the 1st exchange Finland was third and Italy fourth, but the margin was less than 20 seconds to Finland. On the second leg Erling Jevne pulled Norway up to second, still trailing Italy and Fulvio Valbusa by 12 seconds. Norway sent out Bjørn Dæhlie on the third leg, and he made up ground on Fabio Maj. At the final exchange, Italy led by 0.5 seconds, with Finland in third, though a full minute behind.

As in Lillehammer the anchor leg battle between Norway and Italy was tight. Thomas Alsgaard was the Norwegian anchor, facing Italy's Silvio Fauner. As the Italians had done four years before, Alsgaard sat on Fauner's tail for most of the leg, refusing to take the lead. Then in the stadium he unleashed a sprint 150 metres from the line, to win the gold medal for his team by 2/10ths of a second. For Bjørn Dæhlie this was his seventh gold medal, a Winter Olympic record at the time.

Finland hung on for the bronze medal, but they were closely challenged by Sweden, which was less than 10 seconds away from the podium.

== Results ==
Each team used four skiers, with each completing racing over the same 10 kilometre circuit. The first two raced in the classical style, and the final pair of skiers raced freestyle.

Rank	Bib	Team	Time	Deficit
1st place, gold medalist(s)	1	Norway; Sture Sivertsen; Erling Jevne; Bjørn Dæhlie; Thomas Alsgaard	1:40:55.7; 26:20.0; 25:18.9; 24:42.3; 24:34.5	—
2nd place, silver medalist(s)	3	Italy; Marco Albarello; Fulvio Valbusa; Fabio Maj; Silvio Fauner	1:40:55.9; 26:04.1; 25:22.2; 24:54.4; 24:35.2	+0.2
3rd place, bronze medalist(s)	2	Finland; Harri Kirvesniemi; Mika Myllylä; Sami Repo; Jari Isometsä	1:42:15.5; 26:01.7; 25:47.5; 25:31.0; 24:55.3	+1:19.8
4	5	Sweden; Mathias Fredriksson; Niklas Jonsson; Per Elofsson; Henrik Forsberg	1:42:25.2; 26:33.7; 26:07.9; 25:25.2; 24:18.4	+1:29.5
5	4	Russia; Vladimir Legotine; Alexey Prokourorov; Sergey Kriyanin; Sergey Tchepikov	1:42:39.5; 26:19.0; 25:21.2; 26:02.4; 24:56.9	+1:43.8
6	20	Switzerland; Jeremias Wigger; Beat Koch; Reto Burgermeister; Wilhelm Aschwanden	1:42:49.2; 26:20.8; 26:12.0; 25:31.8; 24:44.6	+1:53.5
7	14	Japan; Katsuhito Ebisawa; Hiroyuki Imai; Mitsuo Horigome; Kazutoshi Nagahama	1:43:06.7; 26:11.0; 26:13.9; 25:15.2; 25:26.6	+2:11.0
8	6	Germany; Andreas Schlütter; Jochen Behle; René Sommerfeldt; Johann Mühlegg	1:43:16.1; 25:57.4; 26:48.8; 26:01.0; 24:28.9	+2:20.4
9	13	Austria; Markus Gandler; Alois Stadlober; Achim Walcher; Christian Hoffmann	1:43:16.5; 26:00.9; 26:28.5; 25:47.5; 24:59.6	+2:20.8
10	11	Estonia; Andrus Veerpalu; Raul Olle; Elmo Kassin; Jaak Mae	1:44:20.9; 26:50.0; 26:14.3; 26:11.1; 25:05.5	+3:25.2
11	9	Slovakia; Ivan Batory; Martin Bajcicak; Andrey Párička; Stanislav Ježík	1:44:31.6; 26:13.4; 26:19.1; 26:28.5; 25:30.6	+3:35.9
12	16	Ukraine; Gennadiy Nikon; Alexander Zarovnyi; Mikhailo Artyukhov; Nikolay Popovich	1:44:33.9; 26:40.5; 26:30.9; 26:04.3; 25:18.2	+3:38.2
13	17	France; Vincent Vittoz; Patrick Remy; Herve Balland; Philippe Sanchez	1:45:00.2; 26:36.4; 26:28.5; 26:11.3; 25:44.0	+4:04.5
14	7	Belarus; Sergei Dolidovich; Aleksey Tregubov; Alexander Sannikov; Viatscheslav Plaksunov	1:45:15.3; 26:14.1; 27:18.4; 26:16.8; 25:26.0	+4:19.6
15	8	Czech Republic; Lukáš Bauer; Martin Koukal; Petr Michl; Jiří Magál	1:45:35.4; 26:17.6; 27:02.6; 26:12.2; 26:03.0	+4:39.7
16	12	Kazakhstan; Pavel Riabinine; Vladimir Bortsov; Andrey Nevzorov; Vitaly Lilitchenko	1:46:12.9; 26:21.1; 27:16.0; 25:43.9; 26:51.9	+5:17.2
17	15	United States; Marcus Nash; John Bauer; Patrick Weaver; Justin Wadsworth	1:48:16.4; 27:19.7; 27:53.2; 27:07.9; 25:55.6	+7:20.7
18	10	Canada; Donald Farley; Robin McKeever; Chris Blanchard; Guido Visser	1:49:27.4; 28:15.6; 28:00.3; 26:20.3; 26:51.2	+8:31.7
19	18	Spain; Jordi Ribó; Diego Ruiz; Juan Jesús Gutiérrez; Álvaro Gijón	1:49:27.9; 27:51.4; 28:26.0; 26:18.0; 26:52.5	+8:32.2
20	19	South Korea; Park Byung-chul; Ahn Jin-soo; Shin Doo-sun; Park Byung-joo	1:55:17.1; 29:05.0; 29:53.9; 28:15.2; 28:03.0	+14:21.4
