= Brusson, Aosta Valley =

Brusson Breutson (Valdôtain) Brütze/Britze (Walser)
- Comune
- Comune di Brusson; Commune de Brusson
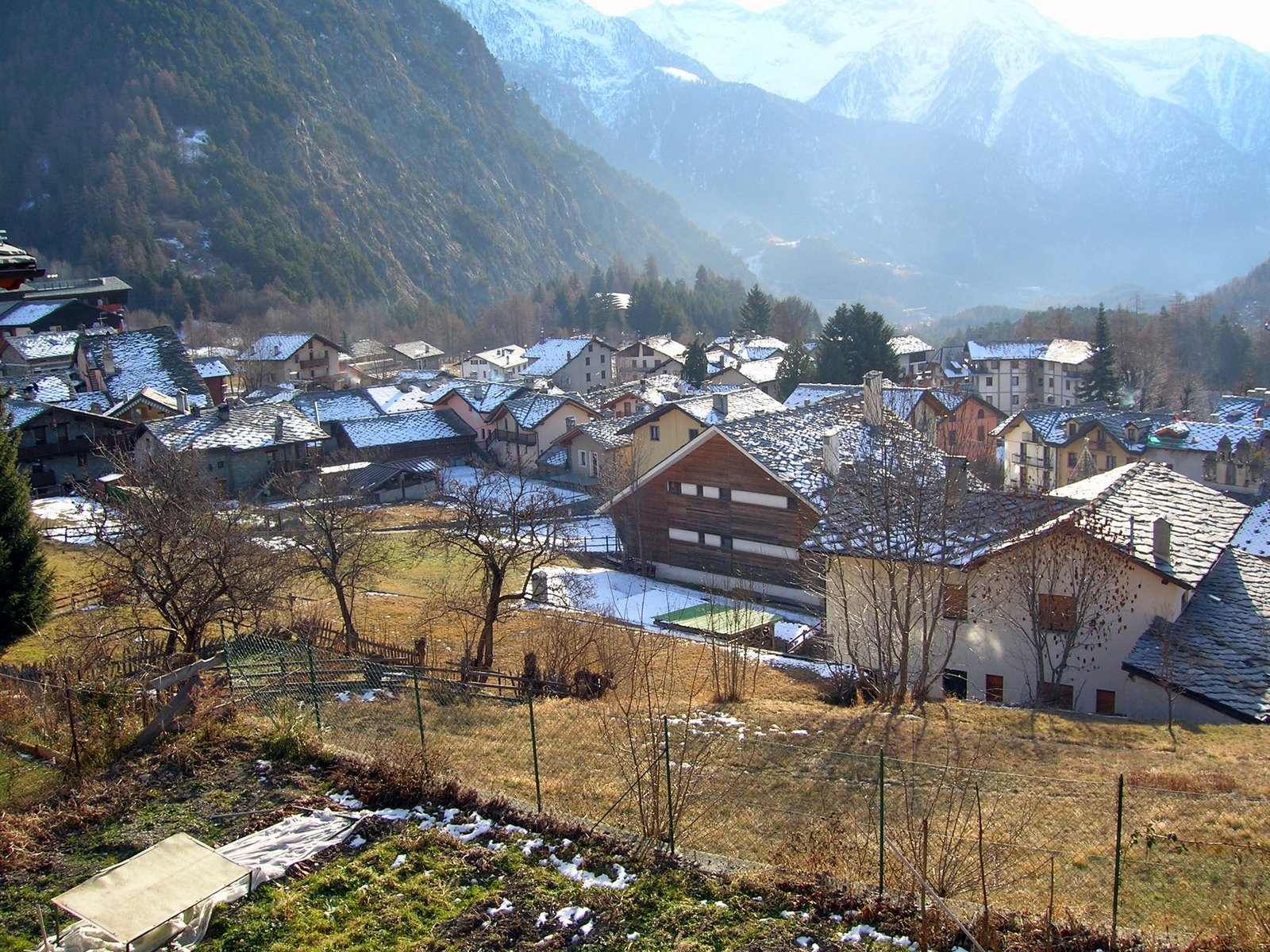

- Coat of arms

- Location within Italy Location within Aosta Valley
- Coordinates: 45°46′N 7°44′E
- Country: Italy
- Region: Aosta Valley
- Province: none
- Frazioni: Pasquier, La Croix, Vollon, Estoul, La Pilaz, Arcésaz, Extrepierre, Fontaine, Graines, Curien, Fénille

Government
  - Mayor: Giulio Grosjacques

Area
  - Total: 55 km^{2} (21 sq mi)
- Elevation: 1,338 m (4,390 ft)

Population (31 December 2022)
  - Total: 849
  - Density: 15/km^{2} (40/sq mi)
- Demonym: Brussonins
- Time zone: UTC+1 (CET)
  - Summer (DST): UTC+2 (CEST)
- Postal code: 11022
- Dialing code: 0125
- Patron saint: Saint Maurice
- Saint day: 22 September
- Website: Official website

Brusson French pronunciation (Valdôtain: Breutson; Issime Walser: Brütze; Gressoney Walser: Britze) is a town and comune in the Ayas Valley, a left side valley of the Aosta Valley region in Italy.

== Description ==
It is well known as a summer and winter vacationing spot, and better known for its plentiful cross-country skiing trails. It is also a good starting point for climbing Monte Rosa. Brusson is part of the Monterosa Ski domain, home to cross-country skiing trails used for several World Cup races. On the road that leads to the Col de Joux mountain pass, which connects the Ayas Valley with Saint-Vincent, there is the fountain where Napoleon is said to have quenched his thirst in 1800. The Chamousira-Fénilliaz mine, the most important gold mine in the Aosta Valley discovered in 1899, is also located in this municipality and was active from 1900 until the end of the 1980s.

=== Landmarks ===
- Graines Castle
- Palasinaz Lakes
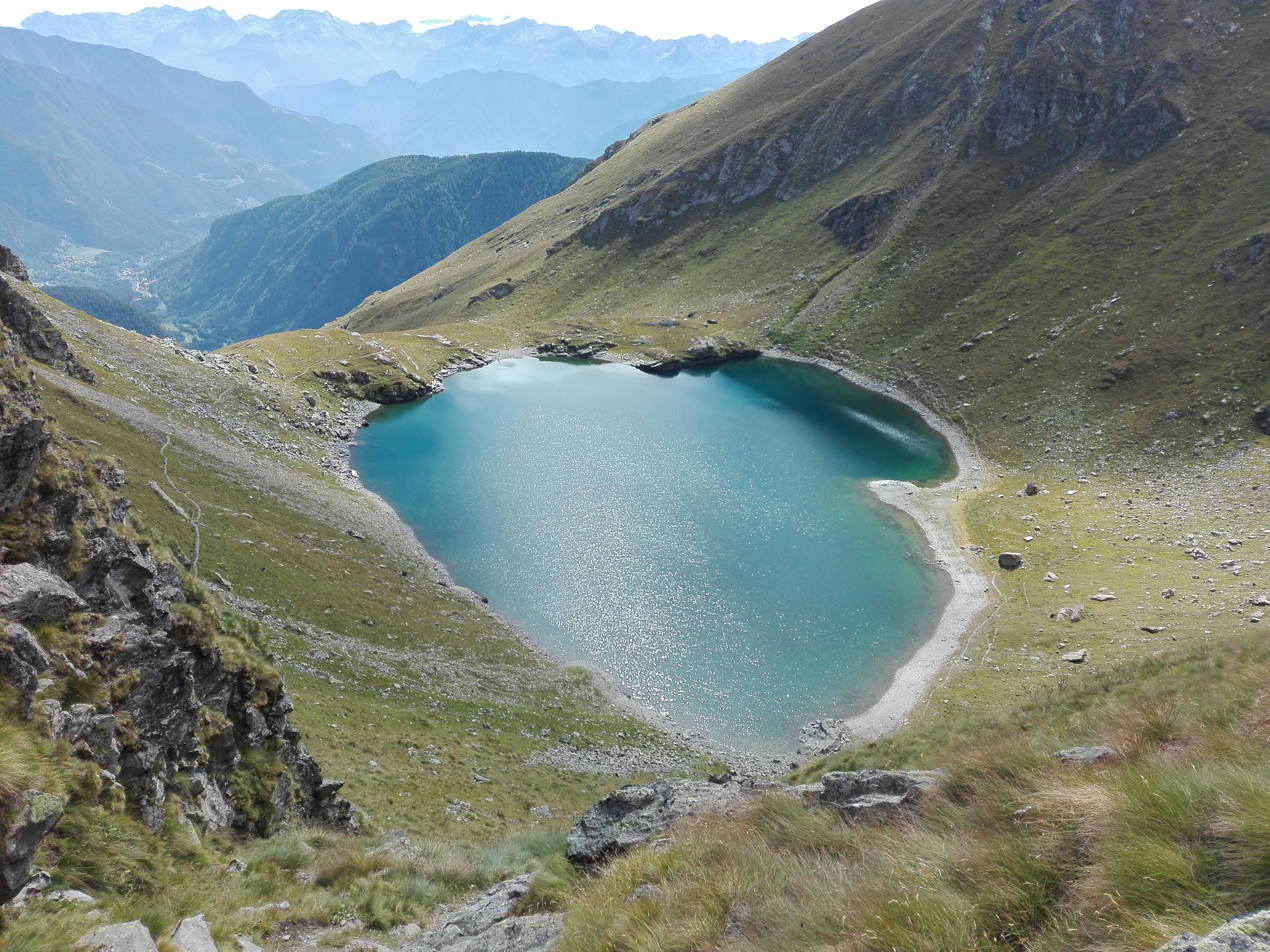
Bringuez lake.

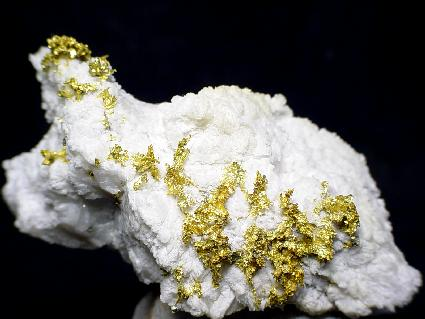
Gold specimen from the old Chamoursira-Fénillaz Mine.

== Hamlets ==
=== Estoul ===
The village of Estoul is located 1,850 m (6,070 ft) above sea level and is characterized by pastures and pine forests. It is part of the municipality of Brusson, from which it is located 2.67 km (1.66 mi) away. Nine families live in the village of Estoul, which has a total of nineteen inhabitants. In this village there are 52 buildings, but only 41 are used of which 32 are for residential purposes, while 9 are intended for commercial or other use.

It is located in the upper part of the Messouère valley, on the eastern side of the Ayas Valley. From the main village of Brusson, it is possible to reach the village by a steep but practicable asphalted road, which ends at an altitude of 1892m.

== Twin towns ==
- Forio, Italy (2008)
