= Christophe Perrillat-Collomb =

French cross-country skier (born 1979)

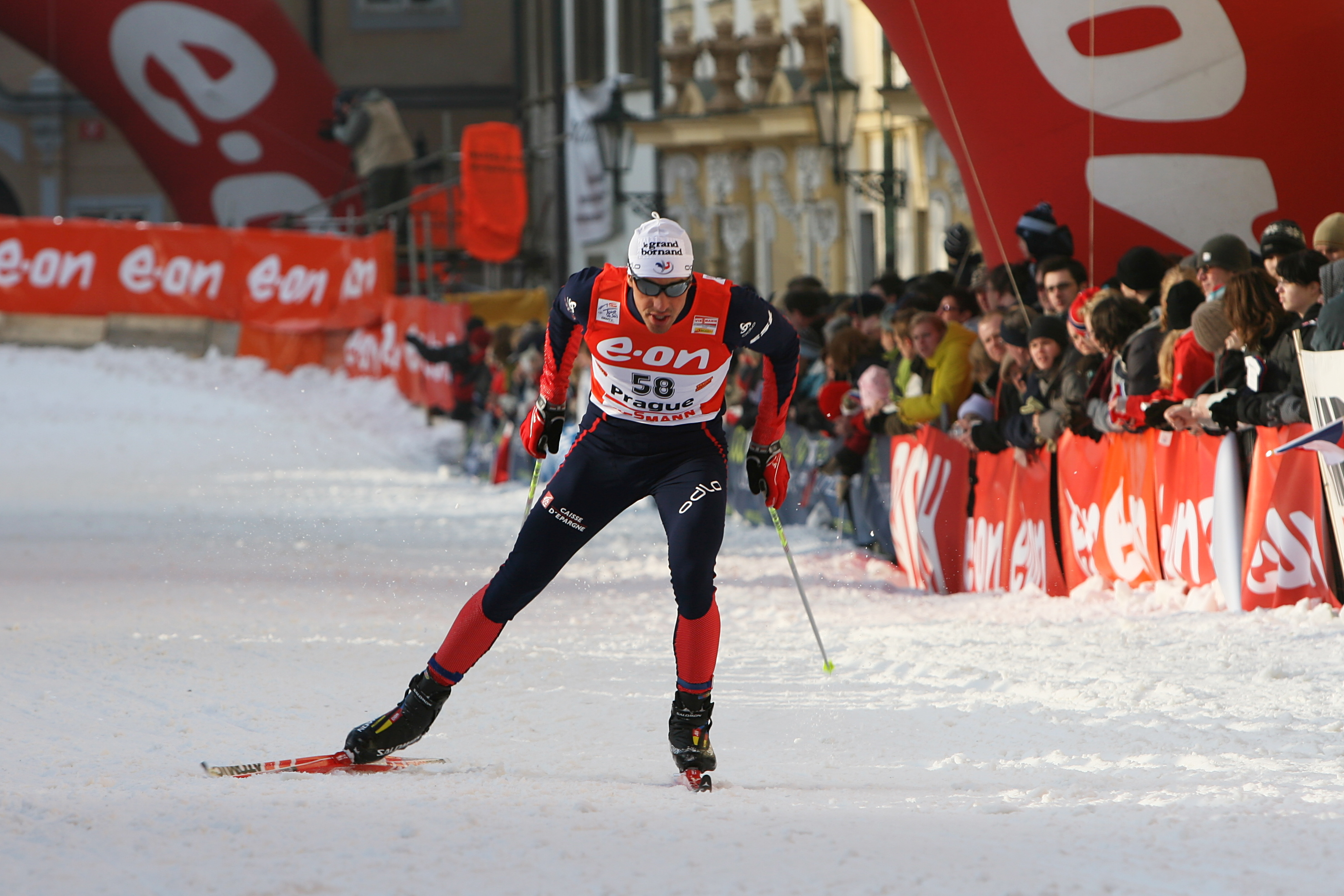

Personal information
- Nationality: France
- Born: 19 January 1979 (age 47) Annecy, France

Sport
- Sport: Skiing
- Club: Grand Bornand

World Cup career
- Seasons: 14 – (2000–2013)
- Indiv. starts: 135
- Indiv. podiums: 0
- Team starts: 23
- Team podiums: 5
- Team wins: 1
- Overall titles: 0 – (70th in 2006)
- Discipline titles: 0

Christophe Perrillat-Collomb (born 19 January 1979 in Annecy) is a French cross-country skier who has competed between 1998 and 2015. His lone World Cup victory was in a 4 × 10 km relay event in France in 2004 while Perrillat's best individual finish was eighth in a 15 km + 15 km double pursuit event at Whistler Olympic Park in January 2009.

Competing in two Winter Olympics, he earned his best finish of eighth in the 4 × 10 km relay at Salt Lake City in 2002. Perrillat's best finish at the FIS Nordic World Ski Championships was sixth in the 4 × 10 km relay at Oberstdorf in 2005.

== Cross-country skiing results ==
All results are sourced from the International Ski Federation (FIS).

=== Olympic Games ===
Year	Age	15 km	Pursuit	30 km	50 km	Sprint	4 × 10 km relay	Team sprint
2002	23	—	56	DNF	—	—	8	—N/a
2006	27	24	34	—N/a	—	—	4	—

=== World Championships ===
Year	Age	15 km	Pursuit	30 km	50 km	Sprint	4 × 10 km relay	Team sprint
2003	24	—	—	40	—	—	—	—N/a
2005	26	—	23	—N/a	15	—	6	—
2007	28	—	DNF	—N/a	25	—	—	—
2009	30	41	—	—N/a	28	—	—	—
2011	32	32	32	—N/a	—	—	—	—

=== World Cup ===
==== Season standings ====
Season	Age	Discipline standings					Ski Tour standings		
Season	Age	Overall	Distance	Long Distance	Middle Distance	Sprint	Nordic Opening	Tour de Ski	World Cup Final
2000	21	NC	—N/a	NC	NC	NC	—N/a	—N/a	—N/a
2001	22	112	—N/a	—N/a	—N/a	NC	—N/a	—N/a	—N/a
2002	23	142	—N/a	—N/a	—N/a	NC	—N/a	—N/a	—N/a
2003	24	NC	—N/a	—N/a	—N/a	—	—N/a	—N/a	—N/a
2004	25	80	53	—N/a	—N/a	NC	—N/a	—N/a	—N/a
2005	26	95	60	—N/a	—N/a	NC	—N/a	—N/a	—N/a
2006	27	70	47	—N/a	—N/a	—	—N/a	—N/a	—N/a
2007	28	120	68	—N/a	—N/a	NC	—N/a	39	—N/a
2008	29	103	61	—N/a	—N/a	NC	—N/a	50	47
2009	30	96	59	—N/a	—N/a	NC	—N/a	—	39
2010	31	NC	NC	—N/a	—N/a	NC	—N/a	DNF	—
2011	32	107	68	—N/a	—N/a	NC	62	29	—
2012	33	75	48	—N/a	—N/a	NC	54	37	—
2013	34	NC	NC	—N/a	—N/a	—	—	—	—

==== Team podiums ====
- 1 victory – (1 RL)
- 5 podiums – (5 RL)

No.	Season	Date	Location	Race	Level	Place	Teammates
1	2003–04	7 February 2004	La Clusaz, France	4 × 10 km Relay C/F	World Cup	1st	Rousselet / Vittoz / Jonnier
2	2004–05	21 November 2004	Gällivare, Sweden	4 × 10 km Relay C/F	World Cup	3rd	Vittoz / Jonnier / Chauvet
3	2004–05	12 December 2004	Val di Fiemme, Italy	4 × 10 km Relay C/F	World Cup	3rd	Vittoz / Jonnier / Rousselet
4	2005–06	20 November 2005	Beitostølen, Norway	4 × 10 km Relay C/F	World Cup	2nd	Rousselet / Jonnier / Vittoz
5	2006–07	25 March 2007	Falun, Sweden	4 × 10 km Relay C/F	World Cup	3rd	Gaillard / Vittoz / Jonnier
