= Reto Burgermeister =

Swiss cross country skier

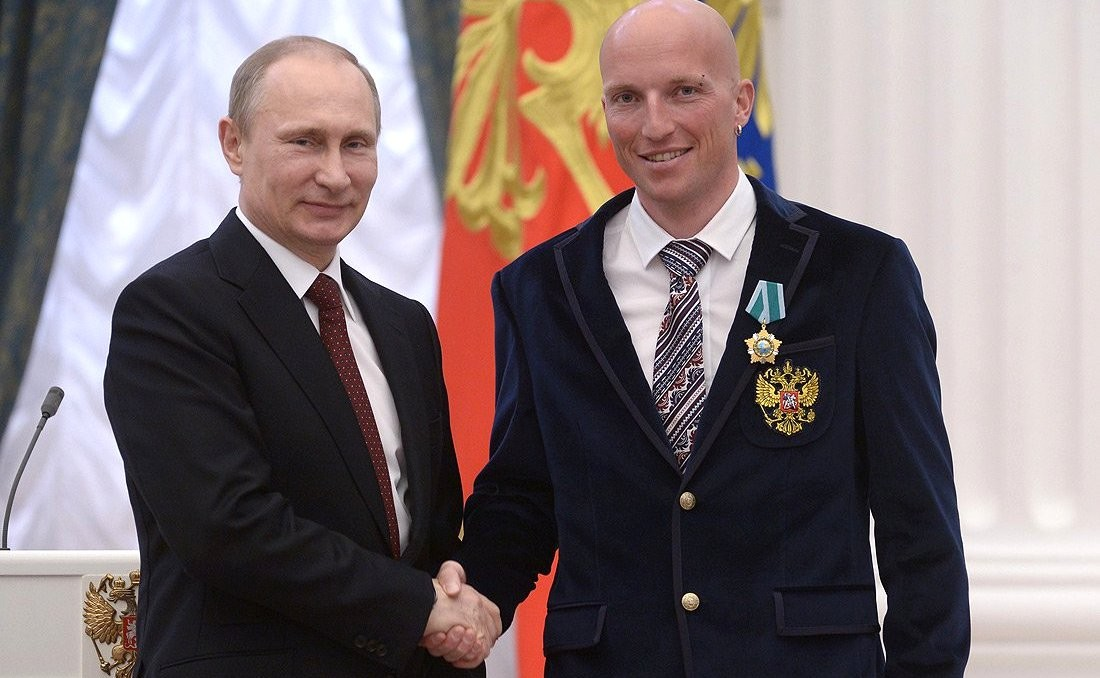
- The coach of the Russian national cross-country skiing team, Reto Burgermeister, was awarded the Order of Friendship by Vladimir Putin in March, 2014

Personal information
- Nationality: Switzerland
- Born: 7 September 1975 (age 50) Pfäffikon, Canton of Zürich, Switzerland

Sport
- Sport: Skiing
- Club: SC Davos

World Cup career
- Seasons: 15 – (1996–2010)
- Indiv. starts: 109
- Indiv. podiums: 2
- Indiv. wins: 0
- Team starts: 26
- Team podiums: 0
- Overall titles: 0 – (31st in 2004)
- Discipline titles: 0

Reto Burgermeister (born 7 September 1975) is a Swiss cross-country skier who has competed since 1994. Competing in three Winter Olympics, he finished sixth in the 4 × 10 km relay at Nagano in 1998 overall and ninth in the 15 km at Salt Lake City in 2002.

Burgermeister's best finish at the FIS Nordic World Ski Championships was tenth in the 30 km event at Val di Fiemme in 2003. His best World Cup finish was second twice in Germany (2003: 15 km, 2004: 15 km + 15 km double pursuit).

Burgermeister earned sixteen individual victories in lesser events up to 30 km from 1998 to 2006.

Burgermeister retired in 2009 as he was very unsuccessful since 2001. He was a former member of the Ski Club am Bachtel, the largest cross-country skiclub in the region of Zurich.

Since 2011 Burgermeister works as a coach for Russian national cross-country skiing team with Alexander Legkov and Ilia Chernousov under his supervision.

== Cross-country skiing results ==
All results are sourced from the International Ski Federation (FIS).

=== Olympic Games ===
Year	Age	10 km	15 km	Pursuit	30 km	50 km	Sprint	4 × 10 km relay	Team sprint
1998	22	—	—N/a	—	—	49	—N/a	6	—N/a
2002	26	—N/a	9	41	—	37	—	10	—N/a
2006	30	—N/a	—	59	—N/a	—	—	7	15

=== World Championships ===
Year	Age	10 km	15 km	Pursuit	30 km	50 km	Sprint	4 × 10 km relay	Team sprint
1999	23	47	—N/a	32	—	—	—N/a	—	—N/a
2001	25	—N/a	18	26	—	—	—	—	—N/a
2003	27	—N/a	21	—	10	—	—	5	—N/a
2005	29	—N/a	—	—	—N/a	—	—	16	—
2007	31	—N/a	—	—	—N/a	40	—	10	—
2009	33	—N/a	50	—	—N/a	—	—	—	—

=== World Cup ===
==== Season standings ====
Season	Age	Discipline standings					Ski Tour standings	
Season	Age	Overall	Distance	Long Distance	Middle Distance	Sprint	Tour de Ski	World Cup Final
1996	20	NC	—N/a	—N/a	—N/a	—N/a	—N/a	—N/a
1997	21	NC	—N/a	NC	—N/a	—	—N/a	—N/a
1998	22	NC	—N/a	NC	—N/a	—	—N/a	—N/a
1999	23	102	—N/a	68	—N/a	—	—N/a	—N/a
2000	24	65	—N/a	53	45	NC	—N/a	—N/a
2001	25	48	—N/a	—N/a	—N/a	NC	—N/a	—N/a
2002	26	79	—N/a	—N/a	—N/a	NC	—N/a	—N/a
2003	27	44	—N/a	—N/a	—N/a	NC	—N/a	—N/a
2004	28	31	22	—N/a	—N/a	—	—N/a	—N/a
2005	29	NC	NC	—N/a	—N/a	—	—N/a	—N/a
2006	30	87	60	—N/a	—N/a	NC	—N/a	—N/a
2007	31	83	74	—N/a	—N/a	NC	24	—N/a
2008	32	137	78	—N/a	—N/a	—	—	DNF
2009	33	180	114	—N/a	—N/a	—	—	—
2010	34	NC	NC	—N/a	—N/a	—	—	—

==== Individual podiums ====
- 2 podiums – (2 WC)

No.	Season	Date	Location	Race	Level	Place
1	2002–03	25 January 2003	Oberhof, Germany	15 km Mass Start C	World Cup	3rd
2	2003–04	13 February 2004	Oberstdorf, Germany	15 km + 15 km Pursuit C/F	World Cup	2nd
