= Cross-country skiing at the 2006 Winter Olympics – Men's 30 kilometre pursuit =

Men's 30 kilometre pursuit at the XX Olympic Winter Games
- Pictogram for cross country
- Venue: Pragelato
- Dates: 12 February 2006
- Competitors: 76 from 27 nations
- Winning time: 1:17:00.8

Medalists
| 1st place, gold medalist(s) | | Yevgeny Dementyev | Russia |
| 2nd place, silver medalist(s) | | Frode Estil | Norway |
| 3rd place, bronze medalist(s) | | Pietro Piller Cottrer | Italy |

The Men's 30 kilometre pursuit cross-country skiing competition at the 2006 Winter Olympics in Turin, Italy, was held on 12 February at Pragelato.

== Summary ==
The pursuit in this format had been skied three times at the Nordic skiing World Championships, and Frenchman Vincent Vittoz was the reigning World Champion. A pursuit event similar to this was skied at the 2002 Winter Olympics, where the gold was shared between Thomas Alsgaard (retired by 2006) and Frode Estil, but the 2002 event 2002 event was a 20 kilometre pursuit, not 30.

The event opened dramatically as Estil fell at the start, causing a mass collision. Then the pack kept together almost until the end, with skiers continually trailing off as they could not keep up with the pace. Eventually, five men came into the finishing straight together, after Anders Södergren of Sweden had tried to pull away on the final lap. However, Södergren could not keep up with the pace, and Russian Yevgeny Dementyev pulled away to defeat Estil and win Russia's first gold medal of the Games.

== Results ==
The pursuit consisted of a 15 kilometre section raced in the classical style, followed by a 15 kilometre portion raced freestyle. In between the sections, each skier took time (approximately 30 seconds) to 'pit', changing their skis. Martin Tauber, an Austrian skier, originally placed 17th, but was disqualified after the IOC declared him permanently ineligible for doping-related violations.

The race was started at 13:45.

| Rank | Bib | Name | Country | 15 km classic | Rank | Pitstop | 15 km free | Rank | Finish time | Deficit |
|---|---|---|---|---|---|---|---|---|---|---|
| 1st place, gold medalist(s) | 13 | Yevgeny Dementyev | Russia | 39:57.9 | 29 | 30.9 | 36:31.9 | 1 | 1:17:00.8 | |
| 2nd place, silver medalist(s) | 4 | Frode Estil | Norway | 39:50.0 | 13 | 28.6 | 36:42.7 | 2 | 1:17:01.4 | +0.6 |
| 3rd place, bronze medalist(s) | 3 | Pietro Piller Cottrer | Italy | 39:46.6 | 3 | 27.1 | 36:47.9 | 9 | 1:17:01.7 | +0.9 |
| 4 | 10 | Giorgio Di Centa | Italy | 39:48.4 | 10 | 27.6 | 36:47.1 | 7 | 1:17:03.2 | +2.4 |
| 5 | 8 | Anders Södergren | Sweden | 39:48.3 | 9 | 27.5 | 36:48.5 | 10 | 1:17:04.3 | +3.5 |
| 6 | 2 | Vincent Vittoz | France | 39:53.6 | 21 | 29.5 | 36:44.3 | 4 | 1:17:07.5 | +6.7 |
| 7 | 20 | Mikhail Botvinov | Austria | 39:51.5 | 17 | 30.1 | 36:46.8 | 6 | 1:17:08.5 | +7.7 |
| 8 | 19 | Martin Bajčičák | Slovakia | 39:55.4 | 26 | 28.8 | 36:44.3 | 4 | 1:17:08.7 | +7.9 |
| 9 | 37 | Maxim Odnodvortsev | Kazakhstan | 39:51.7 | 18 | 30.6 | 36:47.2 | 8 | 1:17:09.6 | +8.8 |
| 10 | 7 | Lukáš Bauer | Czech Republic | 39:46.3 | 1 | 30.1 | 36:53.5 | 11 | 1:17:10.1 | +9.3 |
| 11 | 21 | Markus Hasler | Liechtenstein | 39:55.9 | 27 | 31.0 | 36:43.9 | 3 | 1:17:10.9 | +10.1 |
| 12 | 1 | Tobias Angerer | Germany | 39:47.2 | 6 | 28.6 | 36:56.5 | 13 | 1:17:12.5 | +11.7 |
| 13 | 23 | Ivan Babikov | Russia | 39:49.5 | 12 | 31.6 | 36:56.0 | 12 | 1:17:17.2 | +16.4 |
| 14 | 16 | Jiří Magál | Czech Republic | 39:51.0 | 16 | 30.8 | 36:59.8 | 15 | 1:17:21.7 | +20.9 |
| 15 | 6 | Mathias Fredriksson | Sweden | 39:50.3 | 14 | 27.8 | 37:04.9 | 16 | 1:17:23.1 | +22.3 |
| 16 | 18 | Fabio Santus | Italy | 39:47.8 | 8 | 38.2 | 36:59.4 | 14 | 1:17:25.5 | +24.7 |
| 17 | 25 | Tord Asle Gjerdalen | Norway | 39:53.6 | 21 | 29.2 | 37:13.2 | 17 | 1:17:36.2 | +35.4 |
| 18 | 15 | Valerio Checchi | Italy | 39:49.2 | 11 | 32.0 | 37:16.5 | 18 | 1:17:37.8 | +37.0 |
| 19 | 48 | Kaspar Kokk | Estonia | 39:59.0 | 31 | 28.6 | 37:23.2 | 19 | 1:17:50.8 | +50.0 |
| 20 | 17 | Sami Jauhojärvi | Finland | 39:52.2 | 19 | 29.9 | 37:35.8 | 20 | 1:17:58.1 | +57.3 |
| 21 | 27 | Martin Koukal | Czech Republic | 39:54.4 | 23 | 31.2 | 37:43.9 | 21 | 1:18:09.6 | +1:08.8 |
| 22 | 9 | Jens Filbrich | Germany | 39:46.9 | 4 | 28.0 | 38:23.1 | 23 | 1:18:38.2 | +1:37.4 |
| 23 | 26 | Johan Olsson | Sweden | 39:55.2 | 25 | 31.8 | 38:20.8 | 22 | 1:18:47.9 | +1:47.1 |
| 24 | 41 | Ivan Bátory | Slovakia | 39:47.1 | 5 | 29.2 | 38:41.8 | 26 | 1:18:58.2 | +1:57.4 |
| 25 | 44 | George Grey | Canada | 39:57.4 | 28 | 30.5 | 38:40.8 | 25 | 1:19:08.9 | +2:08.1 |
| 26 | 14 | Alexandre Rousselet | France | 39:53.1 | 20 | 32.5 | 38:51.2 | 27 | 1:19:17.0 | +2:16.2 |
| 27 | 28 | Jan Egil Andresen | Norway | 39:59.3 | 32 | 30.1 | 39:00.3 | 29 | 1:19:29.8 | +2:29.0 |
| 28 | 24 | Anders Aukland | Norway | 39:46.5 | 2 | 30.6 | 39:13.3 | 37 | 1:19:30.6 | +2:29.8 |
| 29 | 50 | Andrey Golovko | Kazakhstan | 39:47.4 | 7 | 35.1 | 39:11.6 | 33 | 1:19:34.3 | +2:33.5 |
| 30 | 35 | Jörgen Brink | Sweden | 39:50.5 | 15 | 32.9 | 39:11.7 | 35 | 1:19:35.3 | +2:34.5 |
| 31 | 47 | Vicente Vilarrubla | Spain | 39:54.9 | 24 | 33.3 | 39:11.5 | 32 | 1:19:39.8 | +2:39.0 |
| 32 | 51 | Aivar Rehemaa | Estonia | 39:58.6 | 30 | 32.3 | 39:20.3 | 38 | 1:19:51.4 | +2:50.6 |
| 33 | 29 | Tero Similä | Finland | 39:59.8 | 33 | 33.0 | 39:31.7 | 42 | 1:20:04.5 | +3:03.7 |
| 34 | 22 | Christophe Perrillat | France | 41:05.9 | 40 | 31.9 | 38:34.1 | 24 | 1:20:12.0 | +3:11.2 |
| 35 | 34 | Milan Šperl | Czech Republic | 40:54.6 | 39 | 30.4 | 38:51.6 | 28 | 1:20:16.7 | +3:15.9 |
| 36 | 38 | Remo Fischer | Switzerland | 40:47.6 | 35 | 30.9 | 39:01.2 | 30 | 1:20:19.7 | +3:18.9 |
| 37 | 33 | Alexander Legkov | Russia | 40:49.2 | 36 | 32.3 | 39:06.7 | 31 | 1:20:28.2 | +3:27.4 |
| 38 | 46 | Dan Roycroft | Canada | 40:52.5 | 38 | 32.3 | 39:28.5 | 41 | 1:20:53.3 | +3:52.5 |
| 39 | 42 | Carl Swenson | United States | 41:25.6 | 47 | 30.0 | 39:12.3 | 36 | 1:21:08.0 | +4:07.2 |
| 40 | 32 | Toni Livers | Switzerland | 41:26.2 | 48 | 30.4 | 39:11.6 | 33 | 1:21:08.2 | +4:07.4 |
| 41 | 30 | Katsuhito Ebisawa | Japan | 41:25.2 | 46 | 28.6 | 39:22.3 | 40 | 1:21:16.2 | +4:15.4 |
| 42 | 45 | Andrew Johnson | United States | 41:22.6 | 42 | 33.6 | 39:20.6 | 39 | 1:21:16.8 | +4:16.0 |
| 43 | 54 | James Southam | United States | 41:56.8 | 51 | 33.6 | 39:35.3 | 44 | 1:22:05.8 | +5:05.0 |
| 44 | 52 | Dmitrij Eremenko | Kazakhstan | 40:50.3 | 37 | 32.6 | 40:46.8 | 53 | 1:22:09.9 | +5:09.1 |
| 45 | 55 | Nejc Brodar | Slovenia | 41:23.9 | 43 | 31.3 | 40:28.6 | 50 | 1:22:23.9 | +5:23.1 |
| 46 | 57 | Mikhail Gumenyak | Ukraine | 42:02.4 | 52 | 38.4 | 39:43.7 | 46 | 1:22:24.6 | +5:23.8 |
| 47 | 63 | Zsolt Antal | Romania | 42:20.5 | 56 | 29.6 | 39:39.6 | 45 | 1:22:29.8 | +5:29.0 |
| 48 | 53 | Lars Flora | United States | 41:06.5 | 41 | 32.1 | 40:52.5 | 54 | 1:22:31.2 | +5:30.4 |
| 49 | 40 | Roman Leybyuk | Ukraine | 41:24.4 | 44 | 30.5 | 40:36.5 | 52 | 1:22:31.5 | +5:30.7 |
| 50 | 65 | Xia Wan | China | 41:47.4 | 50 | 35.1 | 40:09.1 | 47 | 1:22:31.7 | +5:30.9 |
| 51 | 56 | Ivan Arteev | Russia | 41:35.2 | 49 | 37.6 | 40:23.3 | 49 | 1:22:36.2 | +5:35.4 |
| 52 | 62 | Olexandr Putsko | Ukraine | 42:31.1 | 57 | 32.5 | 39:33.8 | 43 | 1:22:37.6 | +5:36.8 |
| 53 | 60 | Michal Malák | Slovakia | 42:03.1 | 53 | 34.9 | 41:01.9 | 56 | 1:23:39.9 | +6:39.1 |
| 54 | 39 | Diego Ruiz | Spain | 43:23.4 | 65 | 32.3 | 40:09.7 | 48 | 1:24:05.5 | +7:04.7 |
| 55 | 59 | Joze Mehle | Slovenia | 43:00.7 | 62 | 44.1 | 40:28.7 | 51 | 1:24:13.6 | +7:12.8 |
| 56 | 61 | Drew Goldsack | Canada | 42:46.3 | 59 | 30.9 | 40:57.1 | 55 | 1:24:14.3 | +7:13.5 |
| 57 | 64 | Oleksandr Batiuk | Ukraine | 42:53.4 | 61 | 39.7 | 41:02.7 | 57 | 1:24:35.9 | +7:35.1 |
| 58 | 49 | Nobu Naruse | Japan | 42:52.0 | 60 | 28.6 | 42:00.6 | 58 | 1:25:21.3 | +8:20.5 |
| 59 | 31 | Reto Burgermeister | Switzerland | 42:05.2 | 54 | 28.9 | 43:15.8 | 63 | 1:25:49.9 | +8:49.1 |
| 60 | 66 | Andrey Kondroschev | Kazakhstan | 43:03.2 | 63 | 40.1 | 42:08.0 | 59 | 1:25:51.4 | +8:50.6 |
| 61 | 58 | Chris Jeffries | Canada | 43:18.9 | 64 | 35.0 | 42:23.0 | 61 | 1:26:17.0 | +9:16.2 |
| 62 | 72 | Ren Long | China | 42:35.2 | 58 | 1:13.7 | 42:37.3 | 62 | 1:26:26.4 | +9:25.6 |
| 63 | 75 | Mihai Galiceanu | Romania | 43:35.7 | 68 | 37.3 | 42:18.7 | 60 | 1:26:31.8 | +9:31.0 |
| 64 | 68 | Denis Klobucar | Croatia | 42:10.8 | 55 | 33.1 | 44:32.3 | 65 | 1:27:16.4 | +10:15.6 |
| 65 | 74 | Sebahattin Oğlago | Turkey | 43:43.0 | 70 | 40.3 | 43:40.4 | 64 | 1:28:03.8 | +11:03.0 |
| | 5 | René Sommerfeldt | Germany | 40:05.1 | 35 | 28.9 | Did not finish | | | |
| | 11 | Emmanuel Jonnier | France | 41:25.0 | 46 | 31.4 | Did not finish | | | |
| | 36 | Shunsuke Komamura | Japan | Did not finish | | | Did not finish | | | |
| | 67 | Park Byeong-ju | South Korea | 43:35.1 | 68 | 38.6 | Did not finish | | | |
| | 69 | Han Dawei | China | 45:41.8 | 72 | 34.8 | Did not finish | | | |
| | 70 | Choi Im-heon | South Korea | Did not finish | | | Did not finish | | | |
| | 71 | Li Zhiguang | China | 43:26.9 | 67 | 37.6 | Did not finish | | | |
| | 73 | Jung Eui-myung | South Korea | 46:23.2 | 73 | 35.3 | Did not finish | | | |
| | 76 | Francesc Soulie | Andorra | 45:19.0 | 71 | 36.1 | Did not finish | | | |
| | 77 | Ivan Bariakov | Bulgaria | 48:44.5 | 74 | | Did not finish | | | |
| | 43 | Olli Ohtonen | Finland | Did not start | | | | | | |
| | 12 | Martin Tauber | Austria | Disqualified | | | | | ~~1:17:28.6~~ | ~~+27.8~~ |
