= Fabio Santus =

Italian cross-country skier

Personal information
- Nationality: Italy
- Born: 26 May 1976 (age 50) Clusone, Italy

Sport
- Sport: Skiing
- Club: C.S. Carabinieri

World Cup career
- Seasons: 15 – (1997–2009, 2012, 2014)
- Indiv. starts: 117
- Indiv. podiums: 0
- Team starts: 25
- Team podiums: 1
- Team wins: 0
- Overall titles: 0 – (28th in 2004)
- Discipline titles: 0
Medal record
Men's cross-country skiing
Representing Italy
Junior World Championships
Gold medal – first place	1995 Gällivare	4 × 10 km relay
Gold medal – first place	1996 Asiago	30 km freestyle
Silver medal – second place	1995 Gällivare	30 km freestyle
Silver medal – second place	1996 Asiago	4 × 10 km relay

Fabio Santus (born Clusone, May 26, 1976) is an Italian cross country skier who has competed since 1995. His best World Cup finish was second in a 4 x 10 km event in Switzerland in 2007 while Santus's best individual finish was fifth in a 15 km + 15 km double pursuit event in Sweden in 2004.

Competing in two Winter Olympics, he earned his best finish of 16th in the 15 km + 15 km double pursuit event at Turin in 2006. Santus's best finish at the FIS Nordic World Ski Championships was 19th in the 50 km event at Val di Fiemme in 2003. He also won the 2010 American Birkebeiner setting a record time of 1:56:58.2.

== Cross-country skiing results ==
All results are sourced from the International Ski Federation (FIS).

=== Olympic Games ===
Year	Age	15 km	Pursuit	30 km	50 km	Sprint	4 × 10 km relay	Team sprint
2002	25	—	—	—	26	—	—	—N/a
2006	29	33	16	—N/a	19	—	—	—

=== World Championships ===
Year	Age	15 km	Pursuit	30 km	50 km	Sprint	4 × 10 km relay	Team sprint
2003	26	—	—	—	19	—	—	—N/a
2005	28	—	—	—N/a	35	—	—	—
2007	30	30	—	—N/a	DNF	—	—	—

=== World Cup ===
==== Season standings ====
Season	Age	Discipline standings					Ski Tour standings		
Season	Age	Overall	Distance	Long Distance	Middle Distance	Sprint	Nordic Opening	Tour de Ski	World Cup Final
1997	20	NC	—N/a	NC	—N/a	—	—N/a	—N/a	—N/a
1998	21	NC	—N/a	NC	—N/a	—	—N/a	—N/a	—N/a
1999	22	NC	—N/a	NC	—N/a	—	—N/a	—N/a	—N/a
2000	23	111	—N/a	78	65	NC	—N/a	—N/a	—N/a
2001	24	NC	—N/a	—N/a	—N/a	NC	—N/a	—N/a	—N/a
2002	25	115	—N/a	—N/a	—N/a	NC	—N/a	—N/a	—N/a
2003	26	102	—N/a	—N/a	—N/a	NC	—N/a	—N/a	—N/a
2004	27	28	19	—N/a	—N/a	—	—N/a	—N/a	—N/a
2005	28	58	36	—N/a	—N/a	—	—N/a	—N/a	—N/a
2006	29	36	23	—N/a	—N/a	—	—N/a	—N/a	—N/a
2007	30	115	66	—N/a	—N/a	—	—N/a	—	—N/a
2008	31	57	41	—N/a	—N/a	NC	—N/a	23	20
2009	32	105	61	—N/a	—N/a	NC	—N/a	—	31
2012	35	146	91	—N/a	—N/a	—	—	—	—
2014	37	NC	NC	—N/a	—N/a	—	—	—	—

==== Team podiums ====
- 1 podium – (1 RL)

No.	Season	Date	Location	Race	Level	Place	Teammates
1	2006–07	4 February 2007	Davos, Switzerland	4 × 10 km Relay C/F	World Cup	2nd	Checchi / Di Centa / Piller Cottrer
