= Remo Fischer =

Swiss cross-country skier

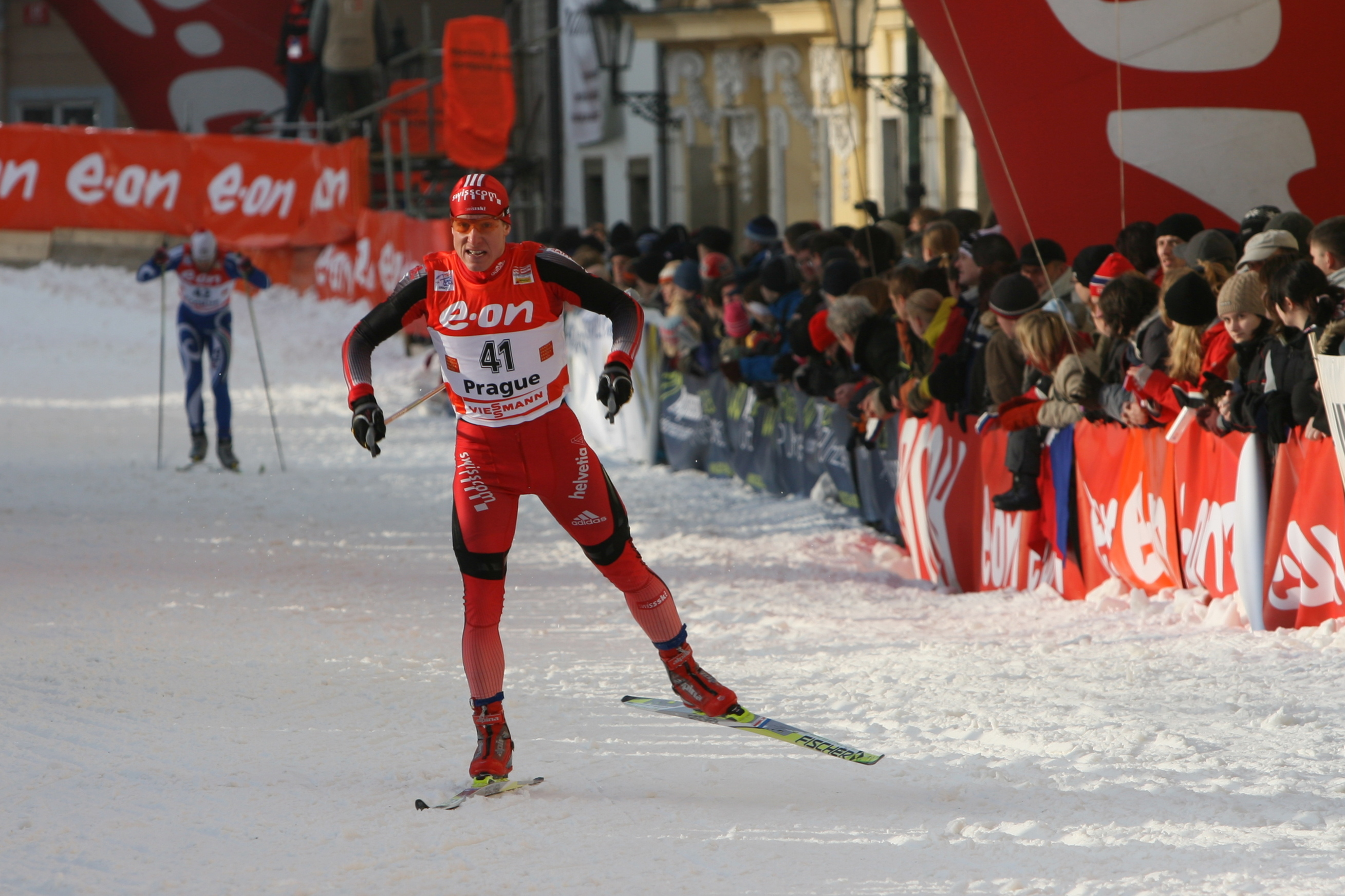
- Remo Fischer in 2007

Personal information
- Nationality: Switzerland
- Born: 13 August 1981 (age 44) Bäretswil, Switzerland

Sport
- Sport: Skiing
- Club: SC Vättis

World Cup career
- Seasons: 12 – (2003–2014)
- Indiv. starts: 100
- Indiv. podiums: 1
- Indiv. wins: 0
- Team starts: 19
- Team podiums: 1
- Team wins: 1
- Overall titles: 0 – (59th in 2011)
- Discipline titles: 0

Remo Fischer (born 13 August 1981 in Bäretswil) is a Swiss cross-country skier who has competed since 2000. He competed at the 2006 Winter Olympics in Turin, finishing 21st in the 50 km and 36th in the 15 km + 15 km double pursuit events.

At the FIS Nordic World Ski Championships, Fischer's best finish was seventh in the 4 × 10 km relay at Liberec in 2009, while his best individual finish was 16th in the 15 km event at Oberstdorf in 2005.

His best World Cup finish was third in the 50 km event at the Holmenkollen ski festival in 2008. Fischer has ten career victories from 10 km to 50 km at lesser events since 2004.

Fischer finished tenth in the 4 × 10 km relay at the 2010 Winter Olympics in Vancouver.

== Cross-country skiing results ==
All results are sourced from the International Ski Federation (FIS).

=== Olympic Games ===
Year	Age	15 km individual	30 km skiathlon	50 km mass start	Sprint	4 × 10 km relay	Team sprint
2006	24	—	36	21	—	7	—
2010	28	15	44	—	—	10	—
2014	32	—	—	22	—	7	—

=== World Championships ===
Year	Age	15 km individual	30 km skiathlon	50 km mass start	Sprint	4 × 10 km relay	Team sprint
2005	23	16	46	—	—	16	—
2007	25	45	—	—	—	—	12
2009	27	—	48	19	—	7	—
2011	29	—	33	37	—	9	—
2013	31	34	—	—	—	9	—

=== World Cup ===
==== Season standings ====
Season	Age	Discipline standings			Ski Tour standings		
Season	Age	Overall	Distance	Sprint	Nordic Opening	Tour de Ski	World Cup Final
2003	21	NC	—N/a	—	—N/a	—N/a	—N/a
2004	22	NC	NC	—	—N/a	—N/a	—N/a
2005	23	129	82	—	—N/a	—N/a	—N/a
2006	24	160	118	—	—N/a	—N/a	—N/a
2007	25	77	45	—	—N/a	—	—N/a
2008	26	60	36	NC	—N/a	DNF	36
2009	27	114	67	NC	—N/a	—	34
2010	28	76	44	—	—N/a	—	—
2011	29	59	44	NC	28	22	—
2012	30	73	46	NC	36	DNF	—
2013	31	82	61	NC	55	29	—
2014	32	112	67	NC	33	DNF	—

==== Individual podiums ====
- 1 podium

No.	Season	Date	Location	Race	Level	Place
1	2007–08	8 March 2008	Oslo, Norway	50 km Individual F	World Cup	3rd

==== Team podiums ====
- 1 victory – (1 RL)
- 1 podium – (1 RL)

No.	Season	Date	Location	Race	Level	Place	Teammates
1	2010–11	19 December 2010	La Clusaz, France	4 c 10 km Relay C/F	World Cup	1st	Livers / Cologna / Perl
