= Jan Egil Andresen =

Norwegian cross-country skier

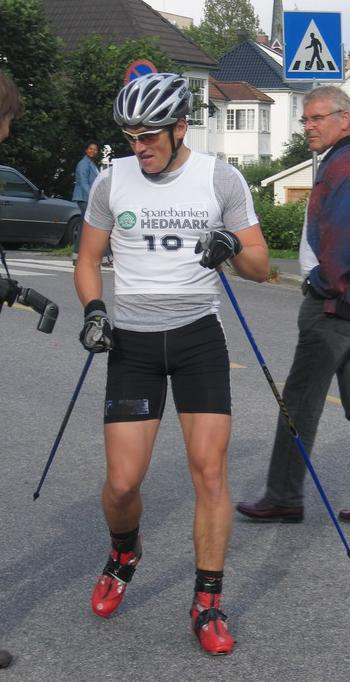

Personal information
- Nationality: Norway
- Born: 25 September 1978 (age 47) Mo i Rana, Norway

Sport
- Sport: Skiing
- Club: Hamar IL

World Cup career
- Seasons: 6 – (2000, 2002–2006)
- Indiv. starts: 27
- Indiv. podiums: 0
- Team starts: 4
- Team podiums: 0
- Overall titles: 0 – (72nd in 2006)
- Discipline titles: 0

Jan Egil Andresen (born 25 September 1978) is a Norwegian cross-country skier, born in Mo i Rana. He competed at the Winter Olympics in Turin in 2006, placing 27th in the 30 km and 41st in the 50 km.

== Cross-country skiing results ==
All results are sourced from the International Ski Federation (FIS).

=== Olympic Games ===
Year	Age	15 km individual	30 km skiathlon	50 km mass start	Sprint	4 × 10 km relay	Team sprint
2006	27	—	27	41	—	—	—

=== World Championships ===
Year	Age	15 km individual	30 km skiathlon	50 km mass start	Sprint	4 × 10 km relay	Team sprint
2005	26	29	—	—	—	—	—

=== World Cup ===
==== Season standings ====
Season	Age					
Season	Age	Overall	Distance	Long Distance	Middle Distance	Sprint
2000	21	NC	—N/a	—	—	NC
2002	23	117	—N/a	—N/a	—N/a	—
2003	24	117	—N/a	—N/a	—N/a	NC
2004	25	107	68	—N/a	—N/a	—
2005	26	73	46	—N/a	—N/a	—
2006	27	72	49	—N/a	—N/a	—
