= FIS Nordic World Ski Championships 2005 – Men's 30 kilometre pursuit =

Men's 30 kilometre pursuit at the FIS Nordic World Ski Championships 2005
- Venue: Oberstdorf
- Date: 20 February 2005
- Competitors: 96
- Winning time: 1:19:20.5

Medalists
gold medal	Vincent Vittoz	France
silver medal	Giorgio Di Centa	Italy
bronze medal	Frode Estil	Norway

The men's 30 kilometre pursuit (15 km classical + 15 km freestyle) at the FIS Nordic World Ski Championships 2005 took place on 20 February 2005 at Oberstdorf, Germany.

Vincent Vittoz of France won the race and became World Champion for the first time.

== Results ==
Rank	Bib	Name	Country	15 km classic	Rank	Pitstop	15 km free	Rank	Finish time	Deficit
1st place, gold medalist(s)	3	Vincent Vittoz	France	41:58.2	11	30.7	36:51.6	1	1:19:20.5	—
2nd place, silver medalist(s)	10	Giorgio Di Centa	Italy	41:58.7	14	28.9	36:53.6	2	1:19:21.3	+0.8
3rd place, bronze medalist(s)	5	Frode Estil	Norway	41:30.9	3	30.1	37:20.3	5	1:19:21.3	+0.8
4	21	Martin Bajčičák	Slovakia	41:31.5	4	29.9	37:20.3	5	1:19:21.8	+1.3
5	15	Anders Södergren	Sweden	41:30.4	2	30.1	37:22.0	7	1:19:22.6	+2.1
6	27	Sergei Dolidovich	Belarus	41:42.2	6	29.2	37:17.8	4	1:19:29.3	+8.8
7	14	Kristen Skjeldal	Norway	41:58.6	13	30.6	37:02.7	3	1:19:32.0	+11.5
8	20	Mikhail Botvinov	Austria	41:30.0	1	30.2	37:40.2	12	1:19:40.5	+20.0
9	9	Fulvio Valbusa	Italy	41:57.6	9	33.2	37:37.6	9	1:20:08.5	+48.0
10	17	Nikolay Pankratov	Russia	41:58.0	10	33.5	37:38.1	11	1:20:09.7	+49.2
11	42	Sami Jauhojärvi	Finland	42:06.2	17	33.7	37:38.0	10	1:20:18.0	+57.5
12	4	Mathias Fredriksson	Sweden	41:47.6	7	28.3	38:07.2	21	1:20:23.1	+1:02.6
13	41	Tero Similä	Finland	41:59.3	16	32.8	37:53.6	16	1:20:25.8	+1:05.3
14	13	Jens Filbrich	Germany	41:59.0	15	30.5	37:58.9	17	1:20:28.5	+1:08.0
15	31	Markus Hasler	Liechtenstein	42:43.0	27	33.3	37:26.5	8	1:20:42.9	+1:22.4
16	28	Roman Leybyuk	Ukraine	42:33.3	23	30.0	37:45.3	13	1:20:48.7	+1:28.2
17	6	Tobias Angerer	Germany	42:37.6	26	29.7	37:45.8	14	1:20:53.2	+1:32.7
18	19	Jiří Magál	Czech Republic	42:06.9	18	29.8	38:16.5	24	1:20:53.3	+1:32.8
19	11	Andrus Veerpalu	Estonia	41:53.2	8	31.7	38:31.4	27	1:20:56.5	+1:36.0
20	16	Pietro Piller Cottrer	Italy	42:36.9	25	28.6	37:51.6	15	1:20:57.2	+1:36.7
21	23	Johan Olsson	Sweden	42:17.9	20	30.8	38:16.1	23	1:21:04.9	+1:44.4
22	8	Yevgeny Dementyev	Russia	42:34.0	24	32.6	38:00.3	18	1:21:07.0	+1:46.5
23	44	Christophe Perrillat	France	43:10.6	30	29.5	38:02.2	19	1:21:42.3	+2:21.8
24	24	Valerio Checchi	Italy	41:58.4	12	29.9	39:20.9	39	1:21:49.3	+2:28.8
25	35	Espen Harald Bjerke	Norway	43:12.0	32	37.2	38:04.8	20	1:21:54.0	+2:33.5
26	36	Gion Andrea Bundi	Switzerland	43:11.1	31	29.1	38:15.5	22	1:21:55.7	+2:35.2
27	50	Martin Koukal	Czech Republic	43:10.1	29	32.7	38:17.2	25	1:22:00.1	+2:39.6
28	1	René Sommerfeldt	Germany	42:57.1	28	29.1	38:34.5	28	1:22:00.8	+2:40.3
29	12	Jaak Mae	Estonia	42:19.7	21	31.3	39:13.6	35	1:22:04.7	+2:44.2
30	2	Axel Teichmann	Germany	43:12.6	33	29.2	39:06.8	33	1:22:48.8	+3:28.3
31	34	Martin Tauber	Austria	41:41.7	5	33.1	40:37.8	53	1:22:52.7	+3:32.2
32	52	George Grey	Canada	43:14.7	34	28.9	39:17.2	37	1:23:00.9	+3:40.4
33	38	Andrey Golovko	Kazakhstan	42:32.1	22	31.9	40:14.5	52	1:23:18.5	+3:58.0
34	7	Lukáš Bauer	Czech Republic	42:13.3	19	29.0	40:38.2	54	1:23:20.7	+4:00.2
35	30	Alexandre Rousselet	France	43:35.4	38	31.5	39:16.7	36	1:23:23.6	+4:03.1
36	53	Katsuhito Ebisawa	Japan	44:21.9	43	33.3	38:30.6	26	1:23:25.9	+4:05.4
37	55	Dmitriy Eremenko	Kazakhstan	43:31.9	37	33.4	39:21.5	40	1:23:26.9	+4:06.4
38	61	Ryo Saito	Japan	44:18.0	42	28.6	38:42.8	29	1:23:29.5	+4:09.0
39	54	Diego Ruiz	Spain	44:27.2	47	40.7	38:44.7	30	1:23:52.7	+4:32.2
40	37	Nikolay Chebotko	Kazakhstan	43:25.7	36	30.3	40:06.1	49	1:24:02.2	+4:41.7
41	33	Christian Stebler	Switzerland	44:23.9	46	30.5	39:19.2	38	1:24:13.7	+4:53.2
42	25	Olli Ohtonen	Finland	43:58.7	39	31.1	39:49.0	43	1:24:18.9	+4:58.4
43	60	Shunsuke Komamura	Japan	43:16.1	35	29.8	40:38.8	55	1:24:24.8	+5:04.3
44	22	Mikhail Ivanov	Russia	43:59.3	40	31.7	40:03.6	46	1:24:34.7	+5:14.2
45	72	Alexander Lasutkin	Belarus	44:47.5	51	32.3	39:23.8	41	1:24:43.6	+5:23.1
46	40	Remo Fischer	Switzerland	44:23.2	45	31.7	40:14.3	51	1:25:09.4	+5:48.9
47	47	Jean-Marc Gaillard	France	44:47.1	50	35.0	39:47.5	42	1:25:09.6	+5:49.1
48	26	Ivan Batory	Slovakia	44:31.2	48	32.0	40:06.9	50	1:25:10.2	+5:49.7
49	49	Andrew Johnsen	United States	45:31.1	58	33.0	39:06.7	32	1:25:10.9	+5:50.4
50	32	Kris Freeman	United States	44:38.4	49	42.9	39:53.2	44	1:25:14.6	+5:54.1
51	59	Vicente Vilarrubla	Spain	45:40.8	60	30.5	39:03.3	31	1:25:14.7	+5:54.2
52	29	Jörgen Brink	Sweden	45:21.7	54	28.5	39:56.2	45	1:25:46.5	+6:26.0
53	69	Valery Rodokhlebov	Finland	45:30.6	57	34.0	40:05.1	48	1:26:09.9	+6:49.4
55	58	Dan Roycroft	Canada	46:26.1	62	32.6	39:11.7	34	1:26:10.6	+6:50.1
56	74	Olexandr Putsko	Ukraine	45:37.2	59	35.3	40:04.6	47	1:26:17.2	+6:56.7
57	39	Maxim Odnodvortsev	Kazakhstan	45:07.1	53	31.6	40:47.5	57	1:26:26.4	+7:05.9
58	57	David Chamberlain	United States	44:47.5	51	37.0	41:30.0	59	1:26:54.6	+7:34.1
59	51	Milan Šperl	Czech Republic	44:13.3	41	32.5	42:25.3	62	1:27:11.1	+7:50.6
60	70	Aleksei Ivanou	Belarus	46:13.9	61	34.1	40:43.0	56	1:27:31.1	+8:10.6
61	45	Devon Kershaw	Canada	45:26:4	56	33.0	41:46.4	60	1:27:45.9	+8:25.4
62	46	Priit Narusk	Estonia	45:25:9	55	33.8	42:03.8	61	1:28:03.6	+8:43.1
	18	Odd-Bjørn Hjelmeset	Norway	DNF						
	43	Carl Swenson	United States	46:26.8	63	32.7	DNF			
	48	Dmitriy Pirogov	Russia	DNF						
	62	Johannes Eder	Austria	DNF						
	64	Mikhail Gumenyak	Ukraine	47:22.9	67	34.5	DNF			
	65	Gordon Jewett	Canada	47:33.5	68	33.1	DNF			
	67	Ben Sim	Australia	DNF						
	68	Martin Møller	Denmark	46:28.1	64	33.5	DNF			
	71	Ben Derrick	Australia	47:22.3	66	40.5	DNF			
	73	Aleksei Novoselki	Lithuania	DNF						
	75	Vitaly Martsyv	Ukraine	DNF						
	76	Ondrej Benka-Rybar	Slovakia	DNF						
	77	Sebahattin Oglago	Turkey	DNF						
	78	Jonas Thor Olsen	Denmark	50:21.8	72	DNF				
	79	Ivan Bariakov	Bulgaria	DNF						
	80	Jakob Jakobsson	Iceland	DNF						
	81	Li Geliang	China	46:37.4	65	36.6	DNF			
	82	Edmond Khachatryan	Armenia	DNF						
	83	Veselin Tzinzov	Bulgaria	DNF						
	84	Vladimir Tupytzin	Israel	DNF						
	85	Gjoko Icoski	Macedonia	DNF						
	86	Han Dawei	China	47:56.6	69	37.2	DNF			
	87	Li Zhiguang	China	48:55.9	71	34.0	DNF			
	88	Erkan Yildrim	Turkey	DNF						
	89	Borce Jovanoski	Macedonia	DNF						
	90	Ye Tian	China	48:45.2	70	35.3	DNF			
	91	Ile Spaseski	Macedonia	DNF						
	92	Igor Ilieski	Macedonia	DNF						
	93	Stephan Langer	Belgium	DNF						
	93	Helio Freitas	Macedonia	DNF						
	94	Khürelbaataryn Khash-Erdene	Mongolia	DNF						
	96	Thorsten Langer	Belgium	DNF						
	63	Denis Vorobiev	Belarus	DNS						
	66	Kaspar Kokk	Estonia	DNS						
