= FIS Nordic World Ski Championships 2007 – Men's 30 kilometre pursuit =

Men's 30 kilometre pursuit at the FIS Nordic World Ski Championships 2007
- Venue: Shirahatayama Open Stadium
- Date: 24 February 2007
- Competitors: 89
- Winning time: 1:11:35.8

Medalists
gold medal	Axel Teichmann	Germany
silver medal	Tobias Angerer	Germany
bronze medal	Pietro Piller Cottrer	Italy

The men's 30 kilometre pursuit (15 km classical + 15 km freestyle) at the FIS Nordic World Ski Championships 2007 took place on 24 February 2007 at the Shirahatayama Open Stadium.

== Results ==
Rank	Bib	Name	Country	15 km classic	Rank	Pitstop	15 km free	Rank	Finish time	Deficit
1st place, gold medalist(s)	4	Axel Teichmann	Germany	36:01.3	8	36.1	34:58.3	1	1:11:35.8	—
2nd place, silver medalist(s)	1	Tobias Angerer	Germany	36:00.0	3	33.4	35:02.8	3	1:11:36.3	+0.5
3rd place, bronze medalist(s)	19	Pietro Piller Cottrer	Italy	36:00.8	5	33.5	35:02.3	2	1:11:36.7	+0.9
4	10	Jens Filbrich	Germany	35:59.2	1	35.8	35:03.8	5	1:11:39.0	+3.2
5	21	Petter Northug	Norway	36:02.6	12	35.1	35:06.2	7	1:11:44.0	+8.2
6	3	Alexander Legkov	Russia	36:01.7	10	36.7	35:06.9	8	1:11:45.3	+9.5
7	17	Lukas Bauer	Czech Republic	36:01.2	7	36.7	35:13.3	11	1:11:51.3	+15.5
8	6	Anders Södergren	Sweden	36:12.8	20	35.1	35:03.6	4	1:11:51.6	+15.8
9	12	Toni Livers	Switzerland	36:04.0	16	36.8	35:10.8	10	1:11:51.7	+15.9
10	2	Vincent Vittoz	France	36:15.4	21	32.4	35:04.5	6	1:11:52.4	+16.6
11	23	Giorgio Di Centa	Italy	36:04.5	17	39.6	35:08.9	9	1:11:53.1	+17.3
12	5	Eldar Rønning	Norway	36:00.5	4	34.1	35:19.3	14	1:11:54.1	+18.3
13	11	René Sommerfeldt	Germany	36:00.9	6	33.3	35:20.3	15	1:11:54.5	+18.7
14	8	Mathias Fredriksson	Sweden	35:59.6	2	33.7	35:22.2	16	1:11:55.6	+19.8
15	22	Jiri Magal	Czech Republic	36:03.4	15	42.4	35:13.3	11	1:11:59.3	+23.5
16	16	Sami Jauhojärvi	Finland	36:08.9	19	33.6	35:19.2	13	1:12:01.8	+26.0
17	9	Frode Estil	Norway	36:02.8	13	34.7	35:26.7	17	1:12:04.3	+28.5
18	24	Martin Bajcicak	Slovakia	36:01.6	9	35.6	35:50.7	19	1:12:28.1	+52.3
19	44	Kris Freeman	United States	36:02.4	11	36.4	36:04.9	22	1:12:43.8	+1:08.0
20	30	Johan Olsson	Sweden	36:03.3	14	40.5	36:19.8	25	1:13:03.6	+1:27.8
21	29	Roland Clara	Italy	36:15.8	22	35.4	36:15.2	24	1:13:06.5	+1:30.7
22	50	Sergey Cherepanov	Kazakhstan	36:47.2	26	36.0	36:13.4	23	1:13:36.8	+2:01.0
23	38	Andrey Golovko	Kazakhstan	36:04.6	18	38.4	37:03.8	34	1:13:47.0	+2:11.2
24	31	Ville Nousiainen	Finland	37:10.4	31	36.5	36:01.2	21	1:13:48.2	+2:12.4
25	41	George Grey	Canada	36:54.6	29	37.3	36:21.7	26	1:13:53.7	+2:17.9
26	28	Valerio Checchi	Italy	36:53.2	27	36.7	36:27.4	29	1:13:57.4	+2:21.6
27	34	Gion Andrea Bundi	Switzerland	37:33.0	36	34.8	35:49.6	18	1:13:57.5	+2:21.7
28	32	Tero Similä	Finland	36:55.0	30	—	—	—	1:13:59.1	+2:23.3
29	49	Kaspar Kokk	Estonia	37:24.7	33	38.9	35:57.8	20	1:14:01.5	+2:25.7
30	39	Curdin Perl	Switzerland	37:25.1	34	38.9	36:24.5	27	1:14:28.7	+2:52.9
31	20	Ilia Chernousov	Russia	37:12.9	32	44.2	36:56.4	32	1:14:53.7	+3:17.9
32	55	Alexey Poltoranin	Kazakhstan	36:46.5	25	35.8	37:31.3	40	1:14:53.7	+3:17.9
33	40	Mats Larsson	Sweden	36:31.5	24	37.3	37:55.3	45	1:15:04.2	+3:28.4
34	25	Maxim Odnovortsev	Kazakhstan	37:31.0	35	39.5	37:02.2	33	1:15:12.8	+3:37.0
35	15	Jean Marc Gaillard	France	38:12.6	46	35.2	36:25.4	28	1:15:13.3	+3:37.5
36	57	Osamu Yamagishi	Japan	38:05.2	40	38.9	36:34.5	30	1:15:18.7	+3:42.9
37	54	Dan Roycroft	Canada	38:07.4	41	39.8	37:05.6	35	1:15:52.8	+4:17.0
38	26	Mikhail Gumenyak	Ukraine	38:11.7	44	42.0	37:13.7	36	1:16:07.4	+4:31.6
39	69	Brian McKeever	Canada	37:57.0	39	41.1	37:30.6	39	1:16:08.7	+4:32.9
...	...	...	...	...	...	...	...	...	...	...
73	88	Leanid Karneyenka	Belarus	LAP						
	7	Emmanuel Jonnier	France	DNF						
	14	Martin Koukal	Czech Republic	DNF						
	18	Ivan Batory	Slovakia	DNF						
	27	Simen Østensen	Norway	36:31.0	23	35.7	DNF			
	33	Alexander Lasutkin	Belarus	DNF						
	35	Markus Hasler	Liechtenstein	DNF						
	36	Roman Leybyuk	Ukraine	DNF						
	37	Christophe Perrillat	France	DNF						
	47	Vicente Vilarrubla	Spain	DNF						
	48	Martin Jaks	Czech Republic	36:54.0	28	DNF				
	53	Nejc Brodar	Slovenia	DNF						
	60	Lauri Pyykönen	Finland	DNF						
	73	Muhammet Kizilarslan	Turkey	DNF						
	68	Francesc Soulie	Andorra	DNS						
	13	Sergey Shiryayev	Russia	DSQ						
	89	Johannes Eder	Austria	DSQ						
