= Emmanuel Jonnier =

French cross-country skier

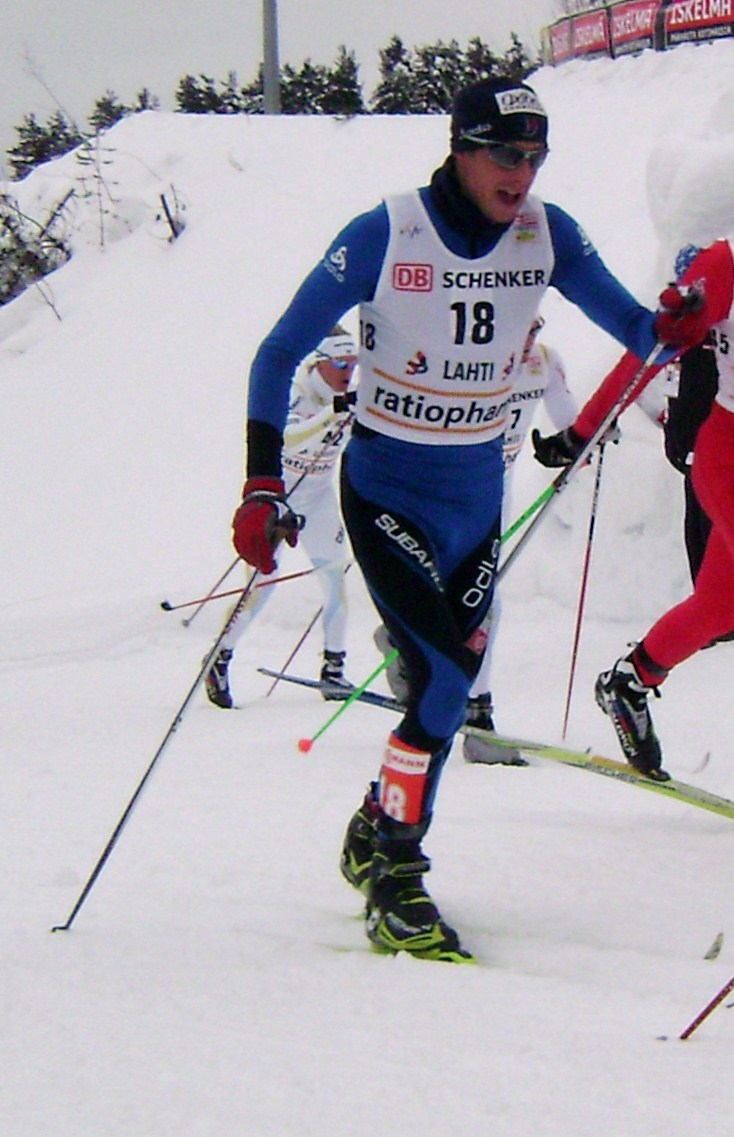
- Emmanuel Jonnier.in 2010

Personal information
- Nationality: France
- Born: 31 May 1975 (age 51) Dijon, France

Sport
- Sport: Skiing
- Club: SC Saint Claude

World Cup career
- Seasons: 13 – (1999–2011)
- Indiv. starts: 124
- Indiv. podiums: 5
- Indiv. wins: 1
- Team starts: 27
- Team podiums: 7
- Team wins: 1
- Overall titles: 0 – (21st in 2006 and 2007)
- Discipline titles: 0

Emmanuel "Manu" Jonnier (born Dijon, May 31, 1975) is a French cross-country skier and non-commissioned officer who has been competing since 1998. His best finish at the Winter Olympics was fourth in the 50 km event at the 2006 games in Turin.

Jonnier's best finish at the FIS Nordic World Ski Championships was fifth in the 4 × 10 km at Sapporo in 2007. His best individual finish was 20th in the 15 km event both in 2005 and 2007.

Jonnier's best individual World Cup finish was second in a 30 km event in Russia in January 2007. He also finished second in a 15 km Continental Cup event in Austria in 2000.

== Cross-country skiing results ==
All results are sourced from the International Ski Federation (FIS).

=== Olympic Games ===
Year	Age	15 km	Pursuit	30 km	50 km	Sprint	4 × 10 km relay	Team sprint
2002	26	—	60	10	—	—	8	—N/a
2006	30	—	DNF	—N/a	4	—	4	—
2010	34	20	—	—N/a	—	—	4	—

=== World Championships ===
Year	Age	10 km	15 km	Pursuit	30 km	50 km	Sprint	4 × 10 km relay	Team sprint
1999	23	—	—N/a	—	—	—	—N/a	15	—N/a
2001	25	—N/a	—	67	—	25	27	—	—N/a
2003	27	—N/a	—	29	—	26	—	11	—N/a
2005	29	—N/a	20	—	—N/a	—	—	6	5
2007	31	—N/a	17	DNF	—N/a	—	—	5	—
2009	33	—N/a	—	51	—N/a	13	—	9	—

=== World Cup ===
==== Season standings ====
Season	Age	Discipline standings					Ski Tour standings		
Season	Age	Overall	Distance	Long Distance	Middle Distance	Sprint	Nordic Opening	Tour de Ski	World Cup Final
1999	23	NC	—N/a	NC	—N/a	—	—N/a	—N/a	—N/a
2000	24	NC	—N/a	—	NC	—	—N/a	—N/a	—N/a
2001	25	86	—N/a	—N/a	—N/a	60	—N/a	—N/a	—N/a
2002	26	103	—N/a	—N/a	—N/a	NC	—N/a	—N/a	—N/a
2003	27	59	—N/a	—N/a	—N/a	—	—N/a	—N/a	—N/a
2004	28	56	35	—N/a	—N/a	—	—N/a	—N/a	—N/a
2005	29	56	34	—N/a	—N/a	NC	—N/a	—N/a	—N/a
2006	30	21	12	—N/a	—N/a	—	—N/a	—N/a	—N/a
2007	31	21	9	—N/a	—N/a	NC	—N/a	26	—N/a
2008	32	34	17	—N/a	—N/a	NC	—N/a	27	26
2009	33	42	29	—N/a	—N/a	106	—N/a	25	28
2010	34	80	47	—N/a	—N/a	113	—N/a	DNF	—
2011	35	48	91	—N/a	—N/a	—	—	—	—

==== Individual podiums ====
- 1 victory – (1 SWC)
- 5 podiums – (3 WC, 2 SWC)

No.	Season	Date	Location	Race	Level	Place
1	2006–07	20 January 2007	Rybinsk, Russia	30 km Mass Start F	World Cup	2nd
2	2006–07	16 February 2007	Changchun, China	15 km Individual F	World Cup	3rd
3	2006–07	24 March 2007	Falun, Sweden	15 km + 15 km Skiathlon C/F	World Cup	3rd
4	2007–08	29 December 2007	Nové Město, Czech Republic	15 km Pursuit F	Stage World Cup	1st
5	2007–08	1 January 2008	Nové Město, Czech Republic	15 km Pursuit F	Stage World Cup	3rd

==== Team podiums ====
- 1 victory – (1 RL)
- 7 podiums – (7 RL)

No.	Season	Date	Location	Race	Level	Place	Teammates
1	2003–04	7 February 2004	La Clusaz, France	4 × 10 km Relay C/F	World Cup	1st	Rousselet / Perrillat-Collomb / Vittoz
2	2004–05	21 November 2004	Gällivare, Sweden	4 × 10 km Relay C/F	World Cup	3rd	Perrillat-Collomb / Vittoz / Chauvet
3	2004–05	12 December 2004	Val di Fiemme, Italy	4 × 10 km Relay C/F	World Cup	3rd	Perrillat-Collomb / Vittoz / Rousselet
4	2005–06	20 November 2005	Beitostølen, Norway	4 × 10 km Relay C/F	World Cup	2nd	Rousselet / Perrillat-Collomb / Vittoz
5	2006–07	4 February 2007	Davos, Switzerland	4 × 10 km Relay C/F	World Cup	3rd	Gaillard / Rousselet / Vittoz
6	2006–07	25 March 2007	Falun, Sweden	4 × 10 km Relay C/F	World Cup	3rd	Perrillat-Collomb Gaillard / Vittoz
7	2008–09	7 December 2008	La Clusaz, France	4 × 10 km Relay C/F	World Cup	3rd	Gaillard / Vittoz / Manificat
