= Alexandre Rousselet =

French cross-country skier (born 1977)

Personal information
- Nationality: France
- Born: 29 January 1977 (age 49) Pontarlier, France

Sport
- Sport: Skiing
- Club: Emhm Métabief

World Cup career
- Seasons: 10 – (2001–2010)
- Indiv. starts: 110
- Indiv. podiums: 0
- Team starts: 21
- Team podiums: 4
- Team wins: 1
- Overall titles: 0 – (33rd in 2006)
- Discipline titles: 0

Alexandre Rousselet (born 29 January 1977) is a French cross-country skier who has competed since 1998. His best individual finish at the Winter Olympics was 19th in the 15 km event at Turin in 2006.

Rousselet's best finish at the FIS Nordic World Ski Championships was fifth in the 4 × 10 km relay at Sapporo in 2007 while his best individual finish was 25th in the 15 km event in 2005.

His best individual career finish was fourth in a 15 km + 15 km double pursuit FIS race in France in 2006 while his best individual World Cup finish was eighth in a 30 km event in Italy, also in 2006.

Rousselet was born in Pontarlier, Doubs.

== Cross-country skiing results ==
All results are sourced from the International Ski Federation (FIS).

=== Olympic Games ===
| Year | Age | 15 km | Pursuit | 30 km | 50 km | Sprint | 4 × 10 km relay | Team sprint |
|---|---|---|---|---|---|---|---|---|
| 2002 | 25 | — | 35 | 47 | — | — | 8 | —N/a |
| 2006 | 29 | 18 | 26 | —N/a | 26 | — | 4 | — |

=== World Championships ===
| Year | Age | 15 km | Pursuit | 30 km | 50 km | Sprint | 4 × 10 km relay | Team sprint |
|---|---|---|---|---|---|---|---|---|
| 2001 | 24 | — | 44 | — | 40 | 33 | — | —N/a |
| 2003 | 26 | 60 | — | — | 47 | — | 11 | —N/a |
| 2005 | 28 | 25 | 35 | —N/a | 26 | — | 6 | — |
| 2007 | 30 | 38 | 44 | —N/a | 42 | — | 5 | — |
| 2009 | 32 | 27 | — | —N/a | — | — | 9 | — |

=== World Cup ===
==== Season standings ====
| Season | Age | Discipline standings | | | Ski Tour standings | |
| Season | Age | Overall | Distance | Sprint | Tour de Ski | World Cup Final |
|---|---|---|---|---|---|---|
| 2001 | 24 | 126 | —N/a | NC | —N/a | —N/a |
| 2002 | 25 | NC | —N/a | NC | —N/a | —N/a |
| 2003 | 26 | 106 | —N/a | NC | —N/a | —N/a |
| 2004 | 27 | 127 | 88 | — | —N/a | —N/a |
| 2005 | 28 | 77 | 49 | — | —N/a | —N/a |
| 2006 | 29 | 33 | 21 | — | —N/a | —N/a |
| 2007 | 30 | 71 | 41 | NC | 42 | —N/a |
| 2008 | 31 | 120 | 67 | NC | 37 | 42 |
| 2009 | 32 | 91 | 62 | 92 | 30 | — |
| 2010 | 33 | NC | NC | — | — | — |

==== Team podiums ====
- 1 victory – (1 RL)
- 4 podiums – (4 RL)

| No. | Season | Date | Location | Race | Level | Place | Teammates |
|---|---|---|---|---|---|---|---|
| 1 | 2003–04 | 7 February 2004 | La Clusaz, France | 4 × 10 km Relay C/F | World Cup | 1st | Perrillat-Collomb / Vittoz / Jonnier |
| 2 | 2004–05 | 12 December 2004 | Val di Fiemme, Italy | 4 × 10 km Relay C/F | World Cup | 3rd | Perrillat-Collomb / Vittoz / Jonnier |
| 3 | 2005–06 | 20 November 2005 | Beitostølen, Norway | 4 × 10 km Relay C/F | World Cup | 2nd | Perrillat-Collomb / Jonnier / Vittoz |
| 4 | 2006–07 | 4 February 2007 | Davos, Switzerland | 4 × 10 km Relay C/F | World Cup | 3rd | Gaillard / Vittoz / Jonnier |
