= Cross-country skiing at the 2006 Winter Olympics – Men's 50 kilometre freestyle =

Men's 50 kilometre freestyle at the XX Olympic Winter Games
- Venue: Pragelato
- Dates: February 26, 2006
- Competitors: 82 from 32 nations
- Winning time: 2:06:11.8

Medalists
1st place, gold medalist(s)		Giorgio Di Centa; Italy
2nd place, silver medalist(s)		Yevgeny Dementyev; Russia
3rd place, bronze medalist(s)		Mikhail Botvinov; Austria

The Men's 50 kilometre freestyle cross-country skiing competition at the 2006 Winter Olympics in Turin, Italy, was held on 26 February, at Pragelato. This was the final day of the Games, and the top three finishers were presented their medals as part of the Closing Ceremony.

This is the first time in Olympic history that the 50 kilometre race is run as a mass start, where all skiers start at the same time, and the winner of the race is the first to cross the finish line. This is unlike the individual start, where skiers start one by one at 30-second intervals, and the winner is the skier whoever runs the distance the fastest.

The 50 kilometre had previously been skied only once as a mass start event at the World Championships, in 2005, with Frode Estil of Norway winning. However, that was in the classical style. The last 50 kilometre freestyle race at a World Championship was in 2003, and Martin Koukal of the Czech Republic won that event. Mikhail Ivanov of Russia was defending Olympic champion on 50 kilometre, but that event was held in classical technique with individual start. The last Olympic mass start race in 2002, won by Christian Hoffmann of Austria, was a shorter 30 kilometre event.

With a pack of 10–15 skiers coming together towards the finish, Giorgio Di Centa won Italy's second gold medal in cross-country skiing. This was the closest Olympic 50 km ever (0.8 seconds), eclipsing the 4.9 seconds that separated Thomas Wassberg from Gunde Svan (both from Sweden) at the 1984 Winter Olympics in Sarajevo.

A photograph of Di Centa in action during this event would be used as the pictogram for the cross-country skiing events at the following Olympics.

== Results ==
The race was a 'mass start', with all 79 skiers starting at the same time. 13 skiers failed to finish the race, while 3 were originally entered, but did not start.

Rank	Name	Country	Time
Gold medal	Giorgio Di Centa	Italy	2:06:11.8
Silver medal	Yevgeny Dementyev	Russia	2:06:12.6
Bronze medal	Mikhail Botwinov	Austria	2:06:12.7
4	Emmanuel Jonnier	France	2:06:13.5
5	Pietro Piller Cottrer	Italy	2:06:14.0
6	Anders Södergren	Sweden	2:06:14.1
7	Martin Koukal	Czech Republic	2:06:14.9
8	Jiří Magál	Czech Republic	2:06:15.1
9	Vincent Vittoz	France	2:06:16.4
10	Mathias Fredriksson	Sweden	2:06:17.1
11	Jean-Marc Gaillard	France	2:06:19.9
12	Sergei Dolidovich	Belarus	2:06:22.4
13	Maxim Odnodvortsev	Kazakhstan	2:06:23.4
14	Martin Bajčičák	Slovakia	2:06:24.9
15	Tord Asle Gjerdalen	Norway	2:06:26.2
16	Lukáš Bauer	Czech Republic	2:06:29.0
17	Jens Filbrich	Germany	2:06:31.1
18	Nikolai Pankratov	Russia	2:06:33.9
19	Fabio Santus	Italy	2:06:38.2
20	Alexander Legkov	Russia	2:06:39.7
21	Remo Fischer	Switzerland	2:06:40.9
22	Juan Jesus Guiterrez	Spain	2:06:43.3
23	Diego Ruiz	Spain	2:06:51.6
24	Tobias Angerer	Germany	2:07:00.3
25	Johan Olsson	Sweden	2:07:00.9
26	Alexandre Rousselet	France	2:07:01.5
27	Milan Šperl	Czech Republic	2:07:01.9
28	Frode Estil	Norway	2:07:06.1
29	Andrey Golovko	Kazakhstan	2:07:19.6
30	Fulvio Valbusa	Italy	2:07:22.5
31	Nejc Brodar	Slovenia	2:07:24.5
32	Toni Livers	Switzerland	2:07:25.4
33	Tor Arne Hetland	Norway	2:07:36.2
34	Andrew Johnson	United States	2:07:56.3
35	Aivar Rehemaa	Estonia	2:08:00.8
36	René Sommerfeldt	Germany	2:08:03.0
37	Denis Krivushkin	Kazakhstan	2:08:05.3
38	Ivan Babikov	Russia	2:08:07.9
39	Markus Hasler	Liechtenstein	2:08:29.0
40	Alexander Lasutkin	Belarus	2:08:40.4
41	Jan Egil Andresen	Norway	2:08:43.7
42	Vicente Vilarrubla	Spain	2:09:03.1
43	Teemu Kattilakoski	Finland	2:09:26.2
44	George Grey	Canada	2:09:38.4
45	Michal Malak	Slovakia	2:09:38.7
46	Zsolt Antal	Romania	2:10:06.7
47	Ivan Bátory	Slovakia	2:10:32.2
48	Li Geilang	China	2:10:36.9
49	Katsuhito Ebisawa	Japan	2:10:39.6
50	Christian Stebler	Switzerland	2:11:13.0
51	Jörgen Brink	Sweden	2:11:19.2
52	Olli Ohtonen	Finland	2:11:54.7
53	Qiung Zhang	China	2:12:13.0
54	Andrey Kondroschev	Kazakhstan	2:13:24.2
55	Joze Mehle	Slovenia	2:13:37.1
56	Mikhail Gumenyak	Ukraine	2:13:44.6
57	Dan Roycroft	Canada	2:13:47.5
58	Chris Jeffries	Canada	2:13:49.5
59	Shunsuke Komamura	Japan	2:14:08.8
60	Oļegs Maļuhins	Latvia	2:15:10.6
61	Kris Freeman	United States	2:15:32.6
62	Vladimir Olschanski	Ukraine	2:16:14.7
63	Ren Long	China	2:16:15.0
	Carl Swenson	United States	DNF
	Ville Nousiainen	Finland	DNF
	Nobu Naruse	Japan	DNF
	James Southam	United States	DNF
	Olexandr Putsko	Ukraine	DNF
	Xia Wan	China	DNF
	Aleksej Novoselkij	Lithuania	DNF
	Jung Eui Myung	South Korea	DNF
	Sabahattin Oglago	Turkey	DNF
	Francesc Soulie	Andorra	DNF
	Valts Eiduks	Latvia	DNF
	Intars Spalvins	Latvia	DNF
	Aleksandar Milenkovic	Serbia and Montenegro	DNF
	Olegs Andrejevs	Latvia	DNF
	Oliver Kraas	South Africa	DNF
	Noureddine Bentoumi	Algeria	DNF
	Mihai Galiceanu	Romania	DNS
	Edmond Khachatryan	Armenia	DNS
	Hovhannes Sargsyan	Armenia	DNS
