= Jean-Marc Gaillard =

French cross-country skier (born 1980)

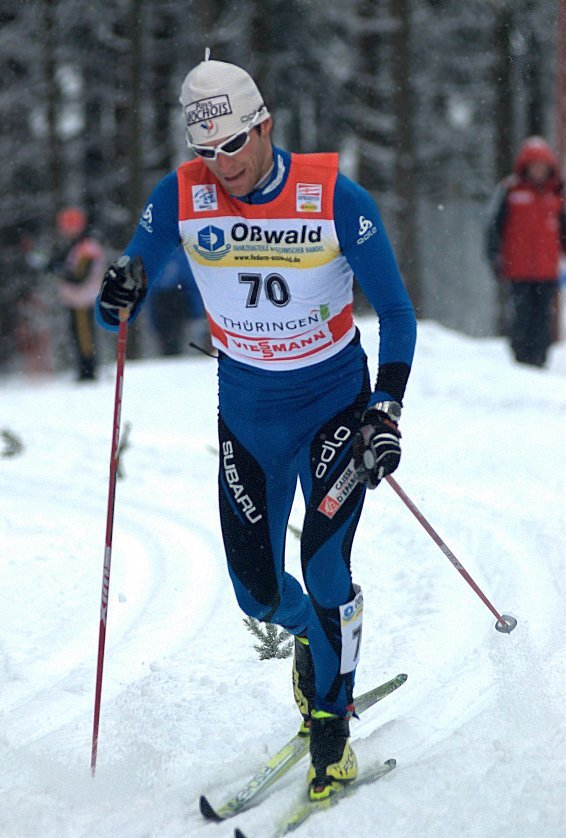

Personal information
- Full name: Jean-Marc Gaillard
- Nationality: France
- Born: 7 October 1980 (age 45) Annemasse, France
- Height: 1.79 m (5 ft 10 in)

Sport
- Sport: Skiing
- Club: SCN Pays Rochois

World Cup career
- Seasons: 21 – (2002–2022)
- Indiv. starts: 300
- Indiv. podiums: 7
- Indiv. wins: 1
- Team starts: 38
- Team podiums: 3
- Team wins: 0
- Overall titles: 0 – (7th in 2009)
- Discipline titles: 0
Medal record
Men's cross-country skiing
Representing France
Olympic Games
Bronze medal – third place	2014 Sochi	4 × 10 km relay
Bronze medal – third place	2018 Pyeongchang	4 × 10 km relay
World Championships
Bronze medal – third place	2015 Falun	4 × 10 km relay
- Updated on 21 March 2022

Jean-Marc Gaillard (born 7 October 1980) is a French cross-country skier who has been competing since 2000. His best finish at the FIS Nordic World Ski Championships was seventh in the 50 km event at Sapporo in 2007. At the 2010 Winter Olympics in Vancouver, Gaillard had his best finish of fourth in the 4 × 10 km relay as well.

== Cross-country skiing results ==
All results are sourced from the International Ski Federation (FIS).

=== Olympic Games ===
- 2 medals – (2 bronze)

Year	Age	15 km individual	30 km skiathlon	50 km mass start	Sprint	4 × 10 km relay	Team sprint
2006	25	23	—	11	—	—	—
2010	29	32	30	19	—	4	—
2014	33	21	6	35	—	Bronze	10
2018	37	23	28	18	—	Bronze	—

=== World Championships ===
- 1 medals – (1 bronze)

Year	Age	15 km individual	30 km skiathlon	50 km mass start	Sprint	4 × 10 km relay	Team sprint
2005	24	—	47	DNF	—	—	—
2007	26	20	35	7	—	5	—
2009	28	14	54	22	—	9	5
2011	30	—	23	DNF	—	11	8
2013	32	DNF	10	DNF	—	—	6
2015	34	30	9	DNF	—	Bronze	—
2017	36	—	26	21	—	7	—
2019	38	—	35	—	—	—	—
2021	40	—	28	40	—	—	—

=== World Cup ===
==== Season standings ====
Season	Age	Discipline standings			Ski Tour standings				
Season	Age	Overall	Distance	Sprint	Nordic Opening	Tour de Ski	Ski Tour 2020	World Cup Final	Ski Tour Canada
2002	21	123	—N/a	NC	—N/a	—N/a	—N/a	—N/a	—N/a
2003	22	NC	—N/a	—	—N/a	—N/a	—N/a	—N/a	—N/a
2004	23	135	95	—	—N/a	—N/a	—N/a	—N/a	—N/a
2005	24	113	72	NC	—N/a	—N/a	—N/a	—N/a	—N/a
2006	25	62	40	—	—N/a	—N/a	—N/a	—N/a	—N/a
2007	26	32	16	NC	—N/a	36	—N/a	—N/a	—N/a
2008	27	46	26	NC	—N/a	DNF	—N/a	DNF	—N/a
2009	28	7	10	44	—N/a	6	—N/a	5	—N/a
2010	29	11	13	66	—N/a	5	—N/a	DNF	—N/a
2011	30	9	8	111	55	6	—N/a	8	—N/a
2012	31	23	17	NC	12	DNF	—N/a	11	—N/a
2013	32	41	26	NC	29	26	—N/a	20	—N/a
2014	33	14	13	102	12	11	—N/a	7	—N/a
2015	34	36	26	NC	19	DNF	—N/a	—N/a	—N/a
2016	35	20	19	NC	—	21	—N/a	—N/a	15
2017	36	24	21	NC	61	15	—N/a	21	—N/a
2018	37	21	18	NC	30	7	—N/a	30	—N/a
2019	38	29	22	NC	29	15	—N/a	22	—N/a
2020	39	34	23	NC	—	22	DNF	—N/a	—N/a
2021	40	57	32	57	—	DNF	—N/a	—N/a	—N/a
2022	41	151	88	—	—N/a	—	—N/a	—N/a	—N/a

==== Individual podiums ====
- 1 victory – (1 WC)
- 7 podiums – (4 WC, 3 SWC)

No.	Season	Date	Location	Race	Level	Place
1	2007–08	16 February 2008	Liberec, Czech Republic	11.4 km Individual F	World Cup	1st
2	2008–09	29 December 2008	Prague, Czech Republic	1.3 km Sprint F	Stage World Cup	3rd
3	2008–09	17 January 2009	Whistler, Canada	15 km + 15 km Skiathlon C/F	World Cup	2nd
4	2008–09	30 January 2009	Rybinsk, Russia	15 km Mass Start F	World Cup	2nd
5	2009–10	10 January 2010	Val di Fiemme, Italy	10 km Pursuit F	Stage World Cup	3rd
6	2010–11	4 February 2011	Rybinsk, Russia	10 km + 10 km Skiathlon C/F	World Cup	2nd
7	2018–19	2 December 2018	Lillehammer, Norway	15 km Pursuit C	Stage World Cup	2nd

==== Team podiums ====
- 3 podiums – (3 RL)

No.	Season	Date	Location	Race	Level	Place	Teammates
1	2006–07	4 February 2007	Davos, Switzerland	4 × 10 km Relay C/F	World Cup	3rd	Jonnier / Rousselet / Vittoz
2	2008–09	7 December 2008	La Clusaz, France	4 × 10 km Relay C/F	World Cup	3rd	Vittoz / Manificat / Jonnier
3	2016–17	18 December 2016	La Clusaz, France	4 × 7.5 km Relay C/F	World Cup	3rd	Jeannerod / Parisse / Manificat
