= Carl Swenson =

American cross-country skier

Personal information
- Born: April 20, 1970 (age 56) Corvallis, Oregon, United States

Sport
- Sport: Skiing
- Club: The Factory Team

World Cup career
- Seasons: 11 – (1994–1997, 2000–2006)
- Indiv. starts: 55
- Indiv. podiums: 0
- Team starts: 11
- Team podiums: 0
- Overall titles: 0 – (64th in 2004)
- Discipline titles: 0
- Updated on November 19, 2021

Carl Swenson (born April 20, 1970) is a retired American cross-country skier, mountain biker, and road cyclist. He competed as a skier at three Winter Olympics.

== Biography ==
Swenson competed at the 1994, 2002, and 2006 Winter Olympics as a cross-country skier. He was a six-time national champion, competing in multiple Nordic events.

Swenson also competed in mountain biking during the skiing off-season, winning a silver medal in the mountain bike race at the 1999 Pan American Games. Three years later, he became the American national mountain bike champion. He retired from skiing after the 2006 Winter Olympics. As a mountain biker, Swenson also competed in endurance events 18-hour and 24-hour races.

Swenson studied at Dartmouth College. He later attended the S.J. Quinney College of Law at the University of Utah becoming a criminal lawyer. Between 2004 and 2006, Swenson was on the board of the International Ski Federation. The following year, he was on the board of directors of the United States Anti-Doping Agency.

== Cross-country skiing results ==
All results are sourced from the International Ski Federation (FIS).

=== Olympic Games ===
Year	Age	10 km	15 km	Pursuit	30 km	50 km	Sprint	4 × 10 km relay	Team sprint
1994	23	—	—N/a	—	45	—	—N/a	—	—N/a
2002	31	—N/a	—	—	56	—	29	5	—N/a
2006	35	—N/a	—	39	—N/a	DNF	—	12	—

=== World Championships ===
Year	Age	10 km	15 km	Pursuit	30 km	50 km	Sprint	4 × 10 km relay	Team sprint
1995	24	—	—N/a	—	—	41	—N/a	14	—N/a
1997	26	—	—N/a	—	64	—	—N/a	15	—N/a
2001	30	—N/a	—	75	—	21	24	13	—N/a
2003	32	—N/a	—	11	—	5	38	12	—N/a
2005	34	—N/a	—	DNF	—N/a	—	—	—	—

=== World Cup ===
==== Season standings ====
Season	Age					
Season	Age	Overall	Distance	Long Distance	Middle Distance	Sprint
1994	23	NC	—N/a	—N/a	—N/a	—N/a
1995	24	NC	—N/a	—N/a	—N/a	—N/a
1996	25	NC	—N/a	—N/a	—N/a	—N/a
1997	26	NC	—N/a	NC	—N/a	—
2000	29	NC	—N/a	—	—	NC
2001	30	98	—N/a	—N/a	—N/a	56
2002	31	66	—N/a	—N/a	—N/a	NC
2003	32	134	—N/a	—N/a	—N/a	—
2004	33	64	41	—N/a	—N/a	NC
2005	34	149	93	—N/a	—N/a	—
2006	35	78	53	—N/a	—N/a	—
