= Espen Harald Bjerke =

Norwegian cross-country skier

Personal information
- Nationality: Norway
- Born: April 12, 1980 (age 46)

Sport
- Sport: Skiing
- Club: Lillehammer SK

World Cup career
- Seasons: 10 – (2001–2010)
- Indiv. starts: 28
- Indiv. podiums: 0
- Team starts: 5
- Team podiums: 0
- Overall titles: 0 – (47th in 2005)
- Discipline titles: 0
Medal record
Men's cross-country skiing
Representing Norway
U23 World Championships
| Gold medal – first place | 2002 Val di Fiemme | 15 km skiathlon |
Junior World Championships
| Silver medal – second place | 2000 Štrbské Pleso | 4 × 10 km relay |

Espen Harald Bjerke (born 12 April 1980) is a Norwegian cross-country skier who represents Lillehammer SK.

He took part in his first junior World Championship in 1999 where he came 13th. He made his World Cup debut in 2001 with a 20th place. His best World Cup placing is (as of 2007) a fourth place in 2005.

He had the record of highest VO2max (maximum amount of oxygen uptake) with 96.0 milliliter per kilogram per minute (7.3 liter/min, 76 kg body weight), set in 2005.

== Cross-country skiing results ==
All results are sourced from the International Ski Federation (FIS).

=== World Championships ===
| Year | Age | 15 km individual | 30 km skiathlon | 50 km mass start | Sprint | 4 × 10 km relay | Team sprint |
|---|---|---|---|---|---|---|---|
| 2005 | 24 | — | 25 | — | — | — | — |

=== World Cup ===
==== Season standings ====
| Season | Age | Discipline standings | | | Ski Tour standings | |
| Season | Age | Overall | Distance | Sprint | Tour de Ski | World Cup Final |
|---|---|---|---|---|---|---|
| 2001 | 20 | 99 | —N/a | — | —N/a | —N/a |
| 2002 | 21 | 81 | —N/a | — | —N/a | —N/a |
| 2003 | 22 | 75 | —N/a | — | —N/a | —N/a |
| 2004 | 23 | NC | NC | — | —N/a | —N/a |
| 2005 | 24 | 47 | 27 | — | —N/a | —N/a |
| 2006 | 25 | NC | NC | — | —N/a | —N/a |
| 2007 | 26 | 112 | 65 | — | — | —N/a |
| 2008 | 27 | 157 | 93 | — | — | — |
| 2009 | 28 | NC | NC | — | — | — |
| 2010 | 29 | 150 | 98 | — | — | — |
