= George Grey (skier) =

Canadian cross-country skier (born 1979)

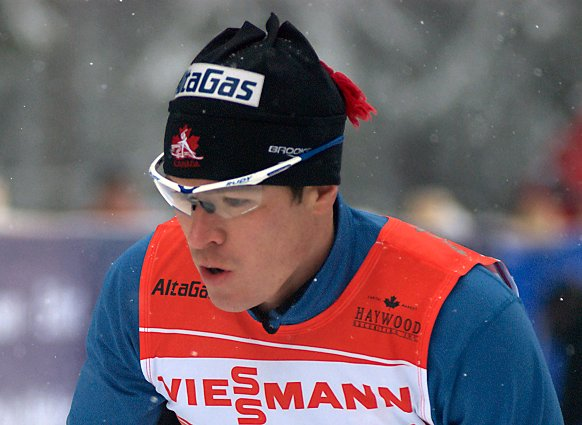
- Grey in 2010

Personal information
- Nationality: Canada
- Born: 22 July 1979 (age 47) Sidcup, England, United Kingdom

Sport
- Sport: Skiing
- Club: Blackjack SC

World Cup career
- Seasons: 10 – (2001, 2003–2011)
- Indiv. starts: 100
- Indiv. podiums: 0
- Team starts: 15
- Team podiums: 1
- Team wins: 0
- Overall titles: 0 – (85th in 2009)
- Discipline titles: 0

George Grey (born 22 July 1979) is a Canadian cross-country skier.

Grey made his World Cup debut in 2001, with his best finish coming in early 2009, when he teamed with Alex Harvey to win a bronze medal in the team sprint. His best individual performance thus far is 16th place, which he achieved at Canmore in 2005 and at Davos in 2008. He also had a ninth-place finish in the prologue of the 2008-09 Tour de Ski.

Grey had a pair of top 10 finishes at the 2009 Nordic World Ski Championships, ending up fifth in the 4 × 10 km relay and ninth in the team sprint.

Competing in two Winter Olympics, Grey earned his best finish of seventh in the 4 × 10 km relay at Vancouver in 2010 and had his best individual finish of eighth in the 30 km pursuit at those same games.

== Cross-country skiing results ==
All results are sourced from the International Ski Federation (FIS).

=== Olympic Games ===
Year	Age	15 km individual	30 km skiathlon	50 km mass start	Sprint	4 × 10 km relay	Team sprint
2006	26	31	25	44	—	11	11
2010	30	29	8	18	—	7	—

=== World Championships ===
Year	Age	15 km	Pursuit	30 km	50 km	Sprint	4 × 10 km relay	Team sprint
2003	23	39	62	—	—	—	15	—N/a
2005	25	—	32	—N/a	DNS	19	13	6
2007	27	70	25	—N/a	—	—	11	—
2009	29	21	—	—N/a	—	—	5	9
2011	31	57	46	—N/a	—	—	12	—

=== World Cup ===
==== Season standings ====
Season	Age	Discipline standings			Ski Tour standings		
Season	Age	Overall	Distance	Sprint	Nordic Opening	Tour de Ski	World Cup Final
2001	21	NC	—N/a	NC	—N/a	—N/a	—N/a
2003	23	NC	—N/a	NC	—N/a	—N/a	—N/a
2004	24	NC	NC	NC	—N/a	—N/a	—N/a
2005	25	NC	NC	NC	—N/a	—N/a	—N/a
2006	26	113	83	69	—N/a	—N/a	—N/a
2007	27	143	92	NC	—N/a	43	—N/a
2008	28	102	60	NC	—N/a	—	—
2009	29	85	53	NC	—N/a	DNF	37
2010	30	120	74	NC	—N/a	DNF	—
2011	31	NC	NC	NC	DNF	—	—

==== Team podiums ====
- 1 podium – (1 TS)

No.	Season	Date	Location	Race	Level	Place	Teammate
1	2008–09	18 January 2009	Whistler, Canada	6 × 1.6 km Team Sprint F	World Cup	3rd	Harvey
