= Curdin Perl =

Swiss cross-country skier

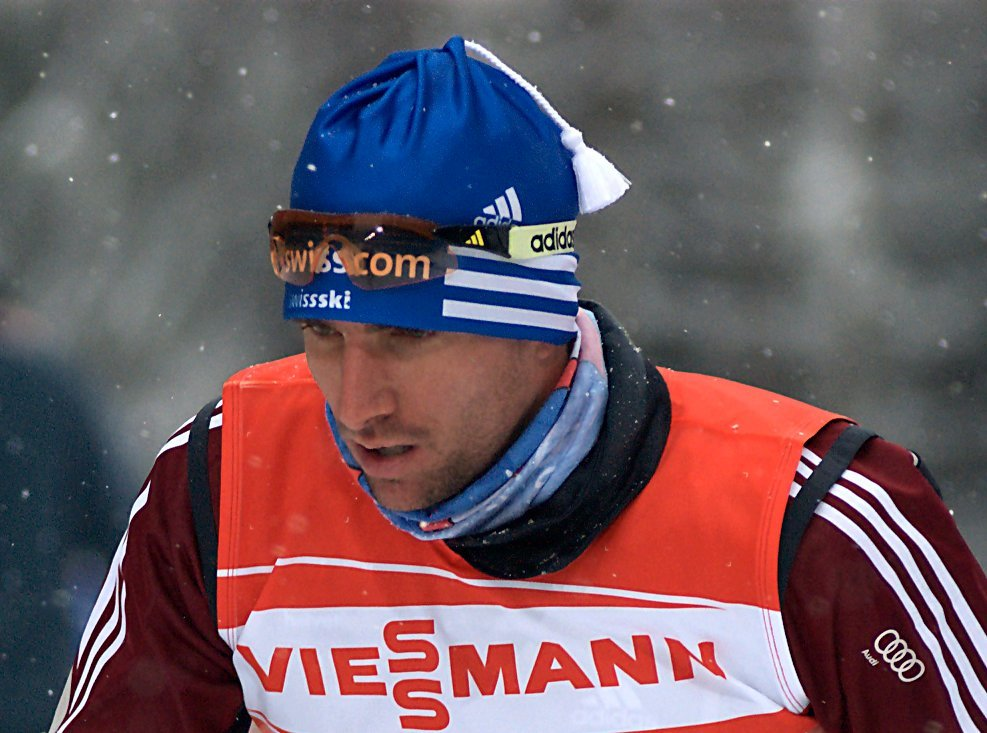
- Curdin Perl in 2010

Personal information
- Nationality: Switzerland
- Born: 15 November 1984 (age 41) Samedan, Switzerland

Sport
- Sport: Skiing
- Club: Bernina Pontresina

World Cup career
- Seasons: 14 – (2005–2018)
- Indiv. starts: 163
- Indiv. podiums: 1
- Indiv. wins: 0
- Team starts: 20
- Team podiums: 1
- Team wins: 1
- Overall titles: 0 – (14th in 2011)
- Discipline titles: 0
Medal record
Men's cross-country skiing
Representing Switzerland
U23 World Championships
Bronze medal – third place	2007 Tarvisio	30 km skiathlon
Junior World Championships
Silver medal – second place	2004 Stryn	30 km classical

Curdin Perl (born 15 November 1984 in Samedan) is a Swiss cross-country skier who has competed since 2001. His best finish at the FIS Nordic World Ski Championships was seventh in the 4 × 10 km relay at Liberec in 2009 while his best individual finish was 27th in the 50 km event at those same championships. In the 50 km at the 2013 World Ski Championships in Val di Fiemme, Italy Curden went off and gained a 20-second four minutes into the race only to be caught later on.

Perl's best individual World Cup finish was tenth in a 15 km event in Davos in 2007. He has a total of eleven victories from 10 km to 30 km between 2003 and 2007.

He finished tenth in the 4 × 10 km relay at the 2010 Winter Olympics in Vancouver.

== Cross-country skiing results ==
All results are sourced from the International Ski Federation (FIS).

=== Olympic Games ===
Year	Age	15 km individual	30 km skiathlon	50 km mass start	Sprint	4 × 10 km relay	Team sprint
2010	25	17	20	—	—	10	—
2014	29	22	26	12	—	7	—

=== World Championships ===
Year	Age	15 km individual	30 km skiathlon	50 km mass start	Sprint	4 × 10 km relay	Team sprint
2007	22	28	30	—	—	10	—
2009	24	—	—	26	—	7	—
2011	26	—	—	44	—	9	—
2013	28	11	14	32	—	6	—
2017	32	—	—	54	—	4	—

=== World Cup ===
==== Season standings ====
Season	Age	Discipline standings			Ski Tour standings			
Season	Age	Overall	Distance	Sprint	Nordic Opening	Tour de Ski	World Cup Final	Ski Tour Canada
2005	20	NC	NC	—	—N/a	—N/a	—N/a	—N/a
2006	21	NC	NC	—	—N/a	—N/a	—N/a	—N/a
2007	22	97	57	—	—N/a	—	—N/a	—N/a
2008	23	94	59	—	—N/a	—	29	—N/a
2009	24	53	38	65	—N/a	29	32	—N/a
2010	25	24	21	NC	—N/a	15	12	—N/a
2011	26	14	16	78	DNF	4	—	—N/a
2012	27	72	50	93	56	35	—	—N/a
2013	28	36	22	101	35	17	34	—N/a
2014	29	92	64	NC	—	DNF	—	—N/a
2015	30	144	90	NC	29	27	—N/a	—N/a
2016	31	92	64	NC	38	30	—N/a	DNF
2017	32	120	79	NC	58	DNF	—	—N/a
2018	33	141	92	NC	—	DNF	—	—N/a

==== Individual podiums ====
- 1 podium

No.	Season	Date	Location	Race	Level	Place
1	2010–11	9 January 2011	Val di Fiemme, Italy	9 km Pursuit F	Stage World Cup	3rd

==== Team podiums ====
- 1 victory – (1 RL)
- 1 podium – (1 RL)

No.	Season	Date	Location	Race	Level	Place	Teammates
1	2010–11	19 December 2010	La Clusaz, France	4 × 10 km Relay C/F	World Cup	1st	Livers / Cologna / Fischer
