= Tero Similä =

Finnish cross-country skier

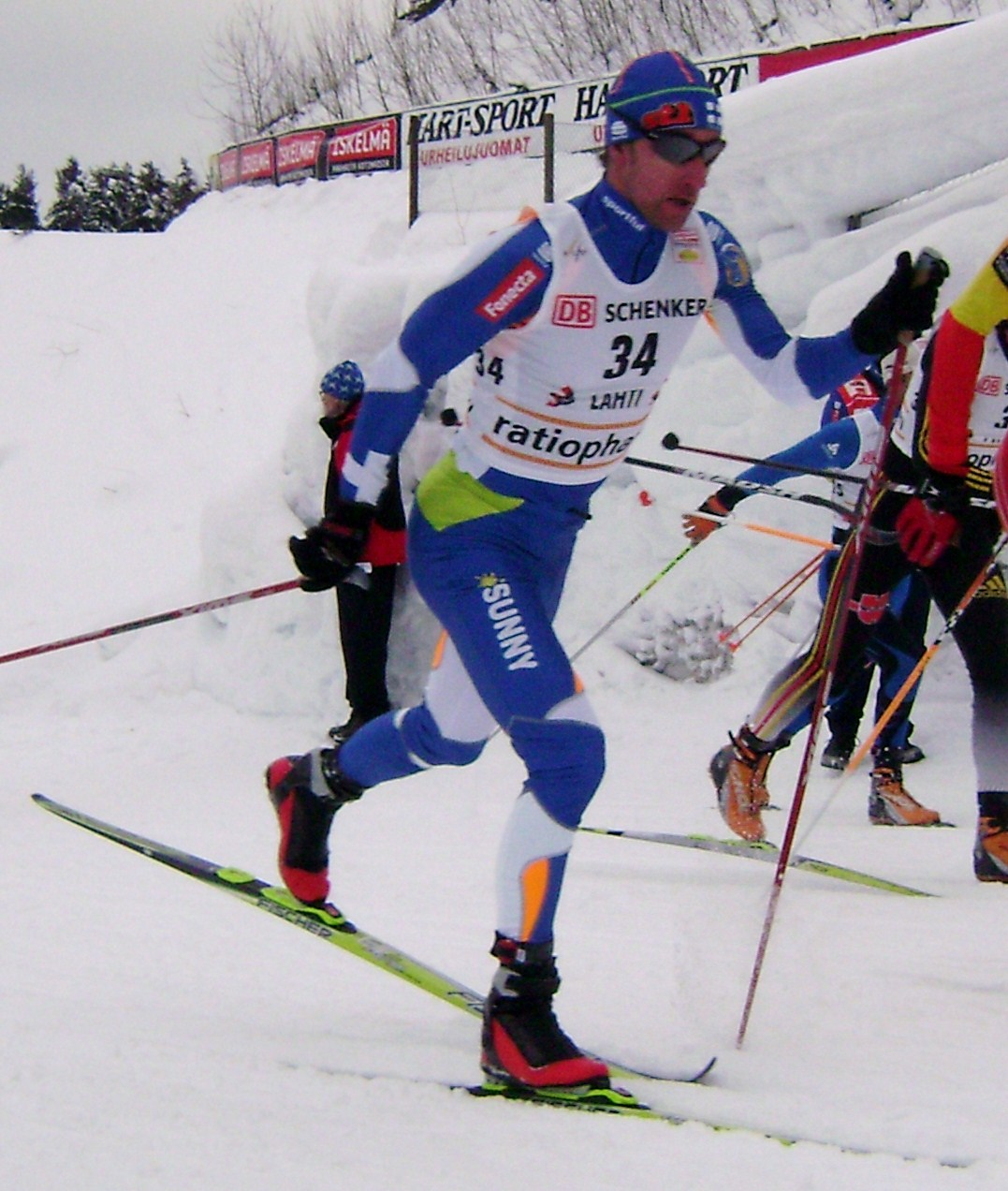
- Tero Similä in 2010

Personal information
- Nationality: Finland
- Born: February 26, 1980 (age 46) Ylivieska, Finland

Sport
- Sport: Skiing
- Club: Ylivieskan Kuula

World Cup career
- Seasons: 14 – (2001–2014)
- Indiv. starts: 72
- Indiv. podiums: 0
- Team starts: 13
- Team podiums: 0
- Overall titles: 0 – (68th in 2005)
- Discipline titles: 0

Tero Similä (born 26 February 1980 in Ylivieska, Northern Ostrobothnia) is a Finnish cross-country skier. He competed in cross-country skiing at the 2006 Winter Olympics in Turin, and placed tenth in the relay with the Finnish team.

== Doping ban ==
Similä tested positive for EPO in an out-of-competition control 9 March 2014. He was handed a two-year ban from sports for the anti-doping rule violation.

== Cross-country skiing results ==
All results are sourced from the International Ski Federation (FIS).

=== Olympic Games ===
Year	Age	15 km individual	30 km skiathlon	50 km mass start	Sprint	4 × 10 km relay	Team sprint
2006	26	32	33	—	—	10	—

=== World Championships ===
Year	Age	15 km individual	30 km skiathlon	50 km mass start	Sprint	4 × 10 km relay	Team sprint
2005	25	—	13	25	—	12	—
2007	27	42	28	22	—	—	—
2011	31	16	28	31	—	—	—
2013	33	37	39	35	—	—	—

=== World Cup ===
==== Season standings ====
Season	Age	Discipline standings			Ski Tour standings			
Season	Age	Overall	Distance	Sprint	Nordic Opening	Tour de Ski	World Cup Final	Ski Tour Canada
2002	22	NC	—N/a	—	—N/a	—N/a	—N/a	—N/a
2003	23	NC	—N/a	—	—N/a	—N/a	—N/a	—N/a
2004	24	148	106	—	—N/a	—N/a	—N/a	—N/a
2005	25	68	43	NC	—N/a	—N/a	—N/a	—N/a
2006	26	97	66	—	—N/a	—N/a	—N/a	—N/a
2007	27	74	43	—	—N/a	—	—N/a	—N/a
2008	28	NC	NC	—	—N/a	—	—	—N/a
2009	29	172	106	—	—N/a	—	—	—N/a
2010	30	158	104	—	—N/a	—	—	—N/a
2011	31	NC	NC	NC	57	—	—	—N/a
2012	32	NC	NC	NC	55	—	—	—N/a
2013	33	NC	NC	—	—	—	—	—N/a
2014	34	NC	NC	NC	50	—	—	—N/a
