= Vincent Vittoz =

French cross-country skier

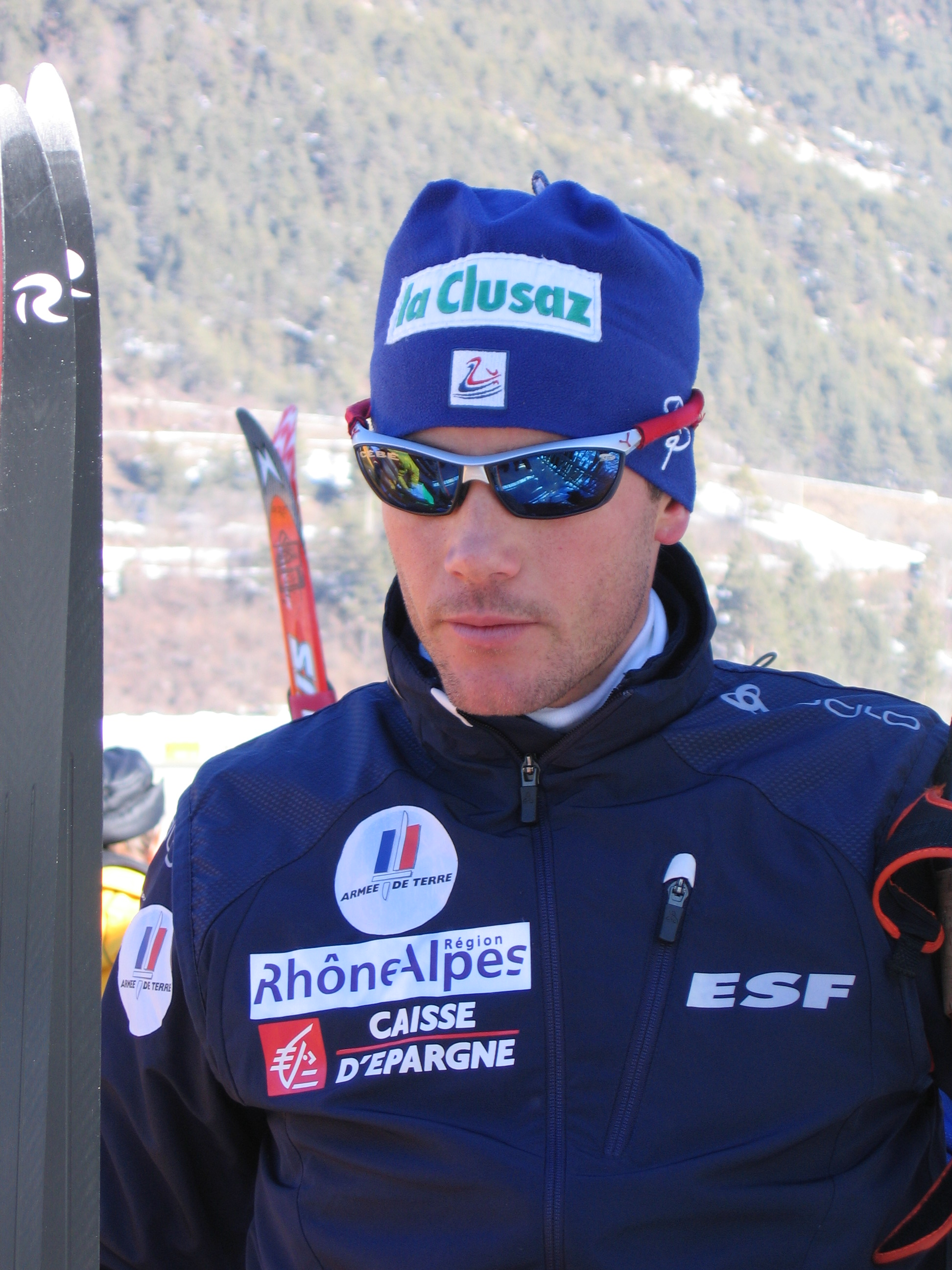

Personal information
- Nationality: France
- Born: 17 July 1975 (age 51) Annecy, France

Sport
- Sport: Skiing
- Club: Défense EMHM La Clusaz

World Cup career
- Seasons: 16 – (1996–2011)
- Indiv. starts: 215
- Indiv. podiums: 26
- Indiv. wins: 8
- Team starts: 37
- Team podiums: 7
- Team wins: 1
- Overall titles: 0 – (2nd in 2005)
- Discipline titles: 0
Medal record
Men's cross-country skiing
Representing France
World Championships
| Gold medal – first place | 2005 Oberstdorf | 30 km skiathlon |

Vincent Vittoz (born 17 July 1975 in Annecy, Haute-Savoie) is a French former cross-country skier, non-commissioned officer and coach. He grew up in the town of La Clusaz in the Northern French Alps and has been competing since 1982. He made his FIS Cross-Country World Cup debut in January 1996 in Nové Město na Moravě, finishing 22nd in a 15 km classical race. He won a gold medal in the 15 km + 15 km double pursuit at the 2005 FIS Nordic World Ski Championships in Oberstdorf. As of 2018 Vittoz is the only French cross-country skiing world champion.

Vittoz's best overall team finish at the Winter Olympics was a fourth place in the 4 × 10 km relay events in Turin in the 2006 and in Vancouver in 2010. His best individual finish in Turin was sixth in the 15 km + 15 km double pursuit in. He finished fifth in the 15 km free event in Vancouver. He competed in four Olympic Games in total, in 1998, 2002, 2006 and 2010.

Vittoz won seven World Cup individual events and one World Cup team event. He was ranked second in the overall classification of the 2005 World Cup.

Vittoz served as an ambassador for Annecy's bid for the 2018 Winter Olympics.

He retired from competition at the end of the 2010-11 season, taking up a position as coach of the French national under-23 cross-country ski team in the spring of 2011. Seven years later, he was appointed as the coach of the French national biathlon team.

== Cross-country skiing results ==
All results are sourced from the International Ski Federation (FIS).

=== Olympic Games ===
| Year | Age | 10 km | 15 km | Pursuit | 30 km | 50 km | Sprint | 4 × 10 km relay | Team sprint |
|---|---|---|---|---|---|---|---|---|---|
| 1998 | 22 | 24 | —N/a | 19 | — | 21 | —N/a | 13 | —N/a |
| 2002 | 26 | —N/a | — | 13 | 11 | — | — | 8 | —N/a |
| 2006 | 30 | —N/a | 14 | 6 | —N/a | 9 | — | 4 | — |
| 2010 | 34 | —N/a | 5 | 15 | —N/a | 13 | — | 4 | 7 |

=== World Championships ===
- 1 medal – (1 gold)

| Year | Age | 10 km | 15 km | Pursuit | 30 km | 50 km | Sprint | 4 × 10 km relay | Team sprint |
|---|---|---|---|---|---|---|---|---|---|
| 1997 | 21 | 28 | —N/a | 28 | 16 | — | —N/a | — | —N/a |
| 1999 | 23 | 45 | —N/a | DNF | — | — | —N/a | 15 | —N/a |
| 2001 | 25 | —N/a | 21 | 19 | — | DNF | 30 | — | —N/a |
| 2003 | 27 | —N/a | — | 28 | DNF | 6 | — | 11 | —N/a |
| 2005 | 29 | —N/a | 6 | Gold | —N/a | — | — | 6 | 5 |
| 2007 | 31 | —N/a | DNF | 10 | —N/a | — | — | 5 | — |
| 2009 | 33 | —N/a | 23 | 6 | —N/a | 9 | — | 9 | — |
| 2011 | 35 | —N/a | — | 34 | —N/a | 22 | — | 11 | — |

=== World Cup ===
==== Season standings ====
| Season | Age | Discipline standings | | | | | Ski Tour standings | | |
| Season | Age | Overall | Distance | Long Distance | Middle Distance | Sprint | Nordic Opening | Tour de Ski | World Cup Final |
|---|---|---|---|---|---|---|---|---|---|
| 1996 | 20 | 67 | —N/a | —N/a | —N/a | —N/a | —N/a | —N/a | —N/a |
| 1997 | 21 | 37 | —N/a | 57 | —N/a | 26 | —N/a | —N/a | —N/a |
| 1998 | 22 | 54 | —N/a | NC | —N/a | 44 | —N/a | —N/a | —N/a |
| 1999 | 23 | 35 | —N/a | 68 | —N/a | 31 | —N/a | —N/a | —N/a |
| 2000 | 24 | 31 | —N/a | 78 | 22 | 18 | —N/a | —N/a | —N/a |
| 2001 | 25 | 16 | —N/a | —N/a | —N/a | 37 | —N/a | —N/a | —N/a |
| 2002 | 26 | 24 | —N/a | —N/a | —N/a | 72 | —N/a | —N/a | —N/a |
| 2003 | 27 | 8 | —N/a | —N/a | —N/a | NC | —N/a | —N/a | —N/a |
| 2004 | 28 | 19 | 15 | —N/a | —N/a | 64 | —N/a | —N/a | —N/a |
| 2005 | 29 | 2nd place, silver medalist(s) | 2nd place, silver medalist(s) | —N/a | —N/a | 60 | —N/a | —N/a | —N/a |
| 2006 | 30 | 5 | 2nd place, silver medalist(s) | —N/a | —N/a | — | —N/a | —N/a | —N/a |
| 2007 | 31 | 6 | 2nd place, silver medalist(s) | —N/a | —N/a | NC | —N/a | 19 | —N/a |
| 2008 | 32 | 11 | 4 | —N/a | —N/a | 53 | —N/a | DNF | 1st place, gold medalist(s) |
| 2009 | 33 | 10 | 11 | —N/a | —N/a | NC | —N/a | 17 | 2nd place, silver medalist(s) |
| 2010 | 34 | 9 | 5 | —N/a | —N/a | NC | —N/a | 18 | 5 |
| 2011 | 35 | 23 | 20 | —N/a | —N/a | NC | — | 11 | 22 |

==== Individual podiums ====
- 8 victories – (7 WC, 1 SWC)
- 26 podiums – (23 WC, 3 SWC)

| No. | Season | Date | Location | Race | Level | Place |
|---|---|---|---|---|---|---|
| 1 | 2000–01 | 8 December 2000 | Santa Caterina, Italy | 15 km Individual F | World Cup | 2nd |
| 2 | 2000–01 | 16 December 2000 | Brusson, Italy | 10 km + 10 km Pursuit C/F | World Cup | 3rd |
| 3 | 2002–03 | 23 November 2002 | Kiruna, Sweden | 10 km Individual F | World Cup | 1st |
| 4 | 2002–03 | 17 December 2002 | Davos, Switzerland | 15 km Individual F | World Cup | 2nd |
| 5 | 2003–04 | 6 December 2003 | Toblach, Italy | 30 km Mass Start F | World Cup | 3rd |
| 6 | 2003–04 | 6 February 2004 | La Clusaz, France | 15 km Individual F | World Cup | 2nd |
| 7 | 2004–05 | 27 November 2004 | Rukatunturi, Finland | 15 km Individual F | World Cup | 1st |
| 8 | 2004–05 | 11 December 2004 | Lago di Tesero, Italy | 15 km + 15 km Pursuit C/F | World Cup | 3rd |
| 9 | 2004–05 | 18 December 2004 | Ramsau, Austria | 30 km Mass Start F | World Cup | 1st |
| 10 | 2004–05 | 15 January 2005 | Nové Město, Czech Republic | 15 km Individual F | World Cup | 1st |
| 11 | 2005–06 | 27 November 2005 | Rukatunturi, Finland | 15 km Individual F | World Cup | 2nd |
| 12 | 2005–06 | 15 December 2005 | Canmore, Canada | 15 km Individual F | World Cup | 2nd |
| 13 | 2005–06 | 31 December 2005 | Nové Město, Czech Republic | 15 km Individual F | World Cup | 1st |
| 14 | 2005–06 | 5 February 2006 | Davos, Switzerland | 15 km Individual C | World Cup | 3rd |
| 15 | 2006–07 | 26 November 2006 | Rukatunturi, Finland | 15 km Individual C | World Cup | 2nd |
| 16 | 2006–07 | 2 January 2007 | Oberstdorf, Germany | 10 km + 10 km Pursuit C/F | Stage World Cup | 1st |
| 17 | 2006–07 | 3 February 2007 | Davos, Switzerland | 15 km Individual F | World Cup | 1st |
| 18 | 2006–07 | 16 February 2007 | Changchun, China | 15 km Individual F | World Cup | 2nd |
| 19 | 2007–08 | 16 March 2008 | Bormio, Italy | 15 km Pursuit F | World Cup | 1st |
| 20 | 2008–09 | 24 January 2009 | Otepää, Estonia | 15 km Individual C | World Cup | 3rd |
| 21 | 2008–09 | 22 March 2009 | Falun, Sweden | 15 km Pursuit F | Stage World Cup | 2nd |
| 22 | 2008–09 | 18–22 March 2009 | (Sweden) World Cup Final | Overall Standings | World Cup | 2nd |
| 23 | 2009–10 | 21 November 2009 | Beitostølen, Norway | 15 km Individual F | World Cup | 2nd |
| 24 | 2009–10 | 13 March 2010 | Oslo, Norway | 50 km Mass Start F | World Cup | 2nd |
| 25 | 2009–10 | 21 March 2010 | Falun, Sweden | 15 km Pursuit F | Stage World Cup | 3rd |
| 26 | 2010–11 | 12 March 2011 | (Finland) Lahti, Estonia | 10 km + 10 km Pursuit C/F | World Cup | 3rd |

==== Team podiums ====
- 1 victory – (1 RL)
- 7 podiums – (7 RL)

| No. | Season | Date | Location | Race | Level | Place | Teammates |
|---|---|---|---|---|---|---|---|
| 1 | 2003–04 | 7 February 2004 | La Clusaz, France | 4 × 10 km Relay C/F | World Cup | 1st | Rousselet / Perrillat-Collomb / Jonnier |
| 2 | 2004–05 | 21 November 2004 | Gällivare, Sweden | 4 × 10 km Relay C/F | World Cup | 3rd | Perrillat-Collomb / Jonnier / Chauvet |
| 3 | 2004–05 | 12 December 2004 | Val di Fiemme, Italy | 4 × 10 km Relay C/F | World Cup | 3rd | Perrillat-Collomb / Jonnier / Rousselet |
| 4 | 2005–06 | 20 November 2005 | Beitostølen, Norway | 4 × 10 km Relay C/F | World Cup | 2nd | Rousselet / Perrillat-Collomb / Jonnier |
| 5 | 2006–07 | 4 February 2007 | Davos, Switzerland | 4 × 10 km Relay C/F | World Cup | 3rd | Gaillard / Jonnier / Rousselet |
| 6 | 2006–07 | 25 March 2007 | Falun, Sweden | 4 × 10 km Relay C/F | World Cup | 3rd | Perrillat-Collomb Gaillard / Jonnier |
| 7 | 2008–09 | 7 December 2008 | La Clusaz, France | 4 × 10 km Relay C/F | World Cup | 3rd | Gaillard / Manificat / Jonnier |
