= FIS Nordic World Ski Championships 2007 – Men's 4 × 10 kilometre relay =

Men's 4 × 10 kilometre relay at the FIS Nordic World Ski Championships 2007
- Venue: Shirahatayama, Sapporo
- Date: 2 March 2007
- Competitors: 68 from 17 nations
- Teams: 17
- Winning time: 1:30:49.2

Medalists
gold medal	Eldar Rønning; Odd-Bjørn Hjelmeset; Lars Berger; Petter Northug	Norway
silver medal	Nikolay Pankratov; Vasily Rochev; Alexander Legkov; Yevgeny Dementyev	Russia
bronze medal	Martin Larsson; Mathias Fredriksson; Marcus Hellner; Anders Södergren	Sweden

The men's 4 x 10 kilometre relay was held on 2 March 2007 at 14:30 CET at Shirahatayama cross-country course in Sapporo. The defending world champions were the Norwegian team of Odd-Bjørn Hjelmeset, Frode Estil, Lars Berger and Tore Ruud Hofstad.

== Results ==
Rank	Bib	Country	Athlete	Time	Deficit
1st place, gold medalist(s)	5	Norway	Eldar Rønning; Odd-Bjørn Hjelmeset; Lars Berger; Petter Northug	1:30:49.2; 25:39.7; 24:49.0; 20:05.4; 20:15.1	—
2nd place, silver medalist(s)	6	Russia	Nikolay Pankratov; Vasily Rochev; Alexander Legkov; Yevgeny Dementyev	1:30:52.4; 25:40.6; 24:50.3; 20:03.0; 20:18.5	+3.2
3rd place, bronze medalist(s)	3	Sweden	Martin Larsson; Mathias Fredriksson; Marcus Hellner; Anders Södergren	1:30:52.7; 25:43.2; 24:45.5; 20:06.2; 20:17.8	+3.5
4	2	Germany	Jens Filbrich; Franz Göring; Tobias Angerer; Axel Teichmann	1:31:39.7; 25:40.4; 25:10.7; 20:21.0; 20:27.6	+50.5
5	4	France	Jean-Marc Gaillard; Vincent Vittoz; Emmanuel Jonnier; Alexandre Rousselet	1:32:15.0; 25:39.4; 25:13.9; 20:18.2; 21:03.5	+1:25.8
6	10	Finland	Ville Nousiainen; Sami Jauhojärvi; Juha Lallukka; Teemu Kattilakoski	1:32:55.5; 25:35.7; 25:16.8; 21:10.7; 20:52.3	+2:06.3
7	12	Kazakhstan	Andrey Golovko; Alexey Poltoranin; Maxim Odnodvortsev; Nikolay Chebotko	1:32:56.4; 25:40.1; 25:35.4; 20:42.0; 20:58.9	+2:07.2
8	9	Czech Republic	Martin Koukal; Lukáš Bauer; Jiří Magál; Milan Sperl	1:32:56.8; 25:46.9; 25:28.2; 20:48.0; 20:53.7	+2:07.6
9	1	Italy	Roland Clara; Giorgio Di Centa; Pietro Piller Cottrer; Cristian Zorzi	1:34:09.3; 26:34.7; 26:11.3; 20:17.2; 21:06.1	+3:20.1
10	7	Switzerland	Reto Burgermeister; Toni Livers; Curdin Perl; Gion Andrea Bundi	1:34:09.6; 25:41.5; 25:54.9; 21:16.1; 21:17.1	+3:20.4
11	11	Canada	Devon Kershaw; George Grey; Dan Roycroft; Drew Goldsack	1:35:12.0; 25:41.7; 26:39.4; 21:30.5; 21:20.4	+4:22.8
12	8	Estonia	Peeter Kummel; Jaak Mae; Kaspar Kokk; Aivar Rehemaa	1:35:30.8; 26:34.2; 26:05.8; 21:10.8; 21:40.0	+4:41.6
13	16	Belarus	Aleksey Ivanov; Alexander Lasutkin; Sergei Dolidovich; Leanid Karneyenka	1:35:51.1; 26:56.6; 26:13.3; 20:55.7; 21:45.5	+5:01.9
14	17	Japan	Katsuhito Ebisawa; Shunsuke Komamura; Osamu Yamagishi; Masaaki Kozu	1:36:39.6; 25:43.0; 26:12.3; 22:11.7; 22:32.6	+5:50.4
15	13	Ukraine	Vitaly Shtun; Roman Leybyuk; Olexandr Putsko; Mikhail Gumenyak	1:37:14.3; 27:59.4; 25:53.7; 21:31.3; 21:49.9	+6:25.1
16	14	China	Xia Wan; Qinghai Sun; Songtao Wang; Geliang Li	LAP; 27:26.6; 28:27.8; LAP; LAP	—
—	15	Austria	Martin Tauber; Mikhail Botvinov; Christian Hoffmann; Jürgen Pinter	DSQ	
