= Olli Ohtonen =

Finnish cross-country skier

Personal information
- Nationality: Finland
- Born: 27 April 1979 (age 47) Helsinki, Finland

Sport
- Sport: Skiing
- Club: Kainuun Hiihtoseura

World Cup career
- Seasons: 10 – (2001–2010)
- Indiv. starts: 47
- Indiv. podiums: 0
- Team starts: 11
- Team podiums: 0
- Overall titles: 0 – (83rd in 2005)
- Discipline titles: 0

Olli Ohtonen (born 27 April 1979) is a Finnish cross-country skier. He competed in the men's 15 kilometre classical event at the 2006 Winter Olympics.

== Cross-country skiing results ==
All results are sourced from the International Ski Federation (FIS).

=== Olympic Games ===
Year	Age	15 km individual	30 km skiathlon	50 km mass start	Sprint	4 × 10 km relay	Team sprint
2006	26	48	DNS	52	—	10	—

=== World Championships ===
Year	Age	15 km	Pursuit	30 km	50 km	Sprint	4 × 10 km relay	Team sprint
2003	23	—	30	34	41	—	—	—N/a
2005	25	28	42	—N/a	DNF	—	12	—

=== World Cup ===
==== Season standings ====
Season	Age	Discipline standings			Ski Tour standings	
Season	Age	Overall	Distance	Sprint	Tour de Ski	World Cup Final
2001	21	130	—N/a	—	—N/a	—N/a
2002	22	120	—N/a	—	—N/a	—N/a
2003	23	NC	—N/a	—	—N/a	—N/a
2004	24	99	63	—	—N/a	—N/a
2005	25	83	52	—	—N/a	—N/a
2006	26	139	100	—	—N/a	—N/a
2007	27	NC	NC	—	—	—N/a
2008	28	NC	NC	—	—	—
2009	29	NC	NC	—	—	—
2010	30	NC	NC	—	—	—
