= Chris Jeffries =

Canadian cross-country skier

Chris Jeffries (born July 1, 1978) is a Canadian cross-country skier.

Jeffries made his World Cup debut in 2001, with his best finish coming in 2004, when he teamed with George Grey to finish 9th in team sprint at Lahti. His best individual performance was a 24th-place finish, which he achieved in a pursuit race at Oberstdorf in 2006.

Jeffries competed in three events at the 2006 Olympics in Turin. His best individual showing came in the 50 kilometres, where he finished 58th. He also was a part of the Canadian team in the relay, which finished 11th.
