= FIS Nordic World Ski Championships 2007 – Men's 15 kilometre freestyle =

Men's 15 km freestyle interval start at the FIS Nordic World Ski Championships 2007
- Venue: Shirahatayama Open Stadium
- Date: 28 February 2007
- Competitors: 121
- Winning time: 35:50.0

Medalists
gold medal	Lars Berger	Norway
silver medal	Leanid Karneyenka	Belarus
bronze medal	Tobias Angerer	Germany

The Men's 15 km classical interval start was part of the FIS Nordic World Ski Championships 2007's events held in Sapporo, Japan. The race went underway on 28 February 2007 at 14:30 CET at Shirahatayama cross-country course in Sapporo. The defending world champion was Italy's Pietro Piller Cottrer.

== Results ==
Rank	Bib	Athlete	Country	Time	Deficit
1st place, gold medalist(s)	55	Lars Berger	Norway	35:50.0	—
2nd place, silver medalist(s)	3	Leanid Karneyenka	Belarus	36:25.8	+35.8
3rd place, bronze medalist(s)	121	Tobias Angerer	Germany	36:42.4	+52.4
4	118	Axel Teichmann	Germany	37:04.6	+1:14.6
5	119	Alexander Legkov	Russia	37:06.4	+1:16.4
6	114	Franz Göring	Germany	37:07.9	+1:17.9
7	90	Johan Olsson	Sweden	37:09.3	+1:19.3
8	72	Marcus Hellner	Sweden	37:13.0	+1:23.0
9	102	Pietro Piller Cottrer	Italy	37:14.3	+1:24.3
10	116	Anders Södergren	Sweden	37:19.0	+1:29.0
11	73	Juha Lallukka	Finland	37:19.9	+1:29.9
12	87	Sergei Dolidovich	Belarus	37:23.9	+1:33.9
13	109	Ole Einar Bjørndalen	Norway	37:26.8	+1:36.8
14	113	Frode Estil	Norway	37:36.4	+1:46.4
15	48	Olexandr Putsko	Ukraine	37:37.1	+1:47.1
16	112	Christian Hoffmann	Austria	37:40.1	+1:50.1
17	115	Emmanuel Jonnier	France	37:41.9	+1:51.9
18	89	Ville Nousiainen	Finland	37:44.9	+1:54.9
19	111	René Sommerfeldt	Germany	37:46.2	+1:56.2
20	105	Jean Marc Gaillard	France	37:57.4	+2:07.4
21	44	Brian McKeever	Canada	38:03.7	+2:13.7
22	117	Yevgeny Dementyev	Russia	38:05.7	+2:15.7
23	67	Sergey Cherepanov	Kazakhstan	38:11.8	+2:21.8
24	100	Petter Northug	Norway	38:13.0	+2:23.0
25	98	Giorgio Di Centa	Italy	38:13.1	+2:23.1
26	107	Martin Koukal	Czech Republic	38:17.5	+2:27.5
27	68	Kaspar Kokk	Estonia	38:26.3	+2:36.3
28	80	Curdin Perl	Switzerland	38:26.9	+2:36.9
29	99	Jiri Magal	Czech Republic	38:27.2	+2:37.2
30	92	Fabio Santus	Italy	38:31.6	+2:41.6
31	71	Nikolay Chebotko	Kazakhstan	38:33.2	+2:43.2
32	75	Janusz Krezelok	Poland	38:33.8	+2:43.8
33	82	Gion Andrea Bundi	Switzerland	38:34.9	+2:44.9
34	37	Songtao Wang	China	38:36.0	+2:46.0
35	47	Zsolt Antal	Romania	38:38.6	+2:48.6
36	101	Nikolay Pankratov	Russia	38:41.4	+2:51.4
37	110	Toni Livers	Switzerland	38:42.6	+2:52.6
38	95	Alexandre Rousselet	France	38:42.8	+2:52.8
39	63	Masaaki Kozu	Japan	38:42.9	+2:52.9
40	56	Katsuhiro Oyama	Japan	38:43.5	+2:53.5
—	...	...	...	...	...
110	10	Rory Morrish	Ireland	52:36.7	+16:46.7
111	8	Philip Boit	Kenya	56:03.2	+20:13.2
112	1	Gokio Dineski	North Macedonia	56:46.1	+20:56.1
113	7	Helio Freitas	Brazil	59:07.5	+23:17.5
—	4	Grigoris Moschovakos	Greece	DNF	
—	120	Vincent Vittoz	France	DNF	
—	60	Dusan Kozisek	Czech Republic	DNS	
—	94	Mikhail Botvinov	Austria	DNS	
—	2	Johannes Eder	Austria	DSQ	
—	40	Yevgeniy Koschevoy	Kazakhstan	DSQ	
—	64	Jürgen Pinter	Austria	DSQ	
—	108	Sergey Shiryayev	Russia	DSQ	
