= FIS Nordic World Ski Championships 2005 – Men's 4 × 10 kilometre relay =

Men's 4 × 10 kilometre relay at the FIS Nordic World Ski Championships 2005
- Venue: Oberstdorf
- Date: 24 February 2005
- Competitors: 68 from 17 nations
- Teams: 17
- Winning time: 1:39:04.4

Medalists
gold medal	Odd-Bjørn Hjelmeset; Frode Estil; Lars Berger; Tore Ruud Hofstad	Norway
silver medal	Jens Filbrich; Andreas Schlütter; Tobias Angerer; Axel Teichmann	Germany
bronze medal	Nikolay Pankratov; Vasily Rochev; Yevgeny Dementyev; Nikolay Bolshakov	Russia

The men's 4 x 10 kilometre relay was held on 24 February 2005 at 12:30 CET in Oberstdorf, Germany. The defending world champions were the Norwegian team of Anders Aukland, Frode Estil, Tore Ruud Hofstad and Thomas Alsgaard.

== Results ==
Rank	Bib	Country	Athlete	Time	Deficit
1st place, gold medalist(s)	1	Norway	Odd-Bjørn Hjelmeset; Frode Estil; Lars Berger; Tore Ruud Hofstad	1:39:04.4; 25:04.6; 24:58.4; 24:02.3; 24:59.1	–
2nd place, silver medalist(s)	2	Germany	Jens Filbrich; Andreas Schlütter; Tobias Angerer; Axel Teichmann	1:39:22.1; 25:05.1; 25:58.6; 24:37.2; 23:41.2	+17.7
3rd place, bronze medalist(s)	4	Russia	Nikolay Pankratov; Vasily Rochev; Yevgeny Dementyev; Nikolay Bolshakov	1:39:23.1; 25:04.2; 24:59.3; 24:04.5; 25:15.1	+18.7
4	10	Italy	Giorgio Di Centa; Fulvio Valbusa; Pietro Piller Cottrer; Cristian Zorzi	1:39:49.3; 25:04.2; 25:57.6; 23:59.8; 24:47.7	+44.9
5	16	Austria	Martin Tauber; Mikhail Botvinov; Roland Diethard; Christian Hoffmann	1:40:40.9; 25:58.2; 25:09.9; 25:12.6; 24:20.2	+1:36.5
6	11	France	Christophe Perrillat; Vincent Vittoz; Emmanuel Jonnier; Alexandre Rousselet	1:40:42.0; 25:40.7; 25:23.2; 24:56.6; 24:41.5	+1:37.6
7	3	Sweden	Mats Larsson; Anders Södergren; Johan Olsson; Mathias Fredriksson	1:42:14.7; 26:17.6; 25:57.7; 25:30.4; 24:29.0	+3:10.3
8	7	Czech Republic	Jiří Magál; Lukáš Bauer; Martin Koukal; Petr Michl	1:42:28.8; 26:35.7; 25:39.9; 24:47.9; 25:25.3	+3:24.4
9	8	Estonia	Raul Olle; Andrus Veerpalu; Jaak Mae; Anti Saarepuu	1:43:21.2; 26:09.1; 25:39.4; 25:15.4; 26:17.3	+4:16.8
10	13	Kazakhstan	Andrey Golovko; Dmitry Eremenko; Nikolay Chebotko; Yevgeniy Koschevoy	1:43:21.6; 25:58.9; 26:34.8; 24:41.7; 26:06.2	+4:17.2
11	12	United States	Kris Freeman; David Chamberlain; Andrew Johnson; Lars Flora	1:43:22.2; 25:42.8; 26:54.3; 24:39.3; 26:05.8	+4:17.8
12	6	Finland	Tero Similä; Olli Ohtonen; Teemu Kattilakoski; Sami Jauhojärvi	1:44:32.9; 27:01.4; 27:02.8; 25:07.7; 25:21.0	+5:28.5
13	15	Canada	Devon Kershaw; George Grey; Dan Roycroft; Chris Jeffries	1:45:03.3; 26:22.5; 26:38.3; 26:08.2; 25:54.3	+5:58.9
14	9	Japan	Katsuhito Ebisawa; Shunsuke Komamura; Ryo Saito; Tomio Kanamaru	1:45:51.1; 27:01.9; 26:54.2; 25:47.3; 26:07.7	+6:46.7
15	14	Ukraine	Vitaly Martsyv; Roman Leybyuk; Olexandr Putsko; Mikhail Gumenyak	LAP; 28:31.6; 26:34.7; 25:51.7; LAP	
16	5	Switzerland	Beat Koch; Reto Burgermeister; Gion Andrea Bundi; Remo Fischer	LAP; 28:32.3; 27:13.0; LAP	
17	17	China	Ye Tian; Geliang Li; Han Dawei; Li Zhiguang	LAP; 29:14.7; 27:12.8; LAP	
