= Christian Stebler =

Swiss cross-country skier

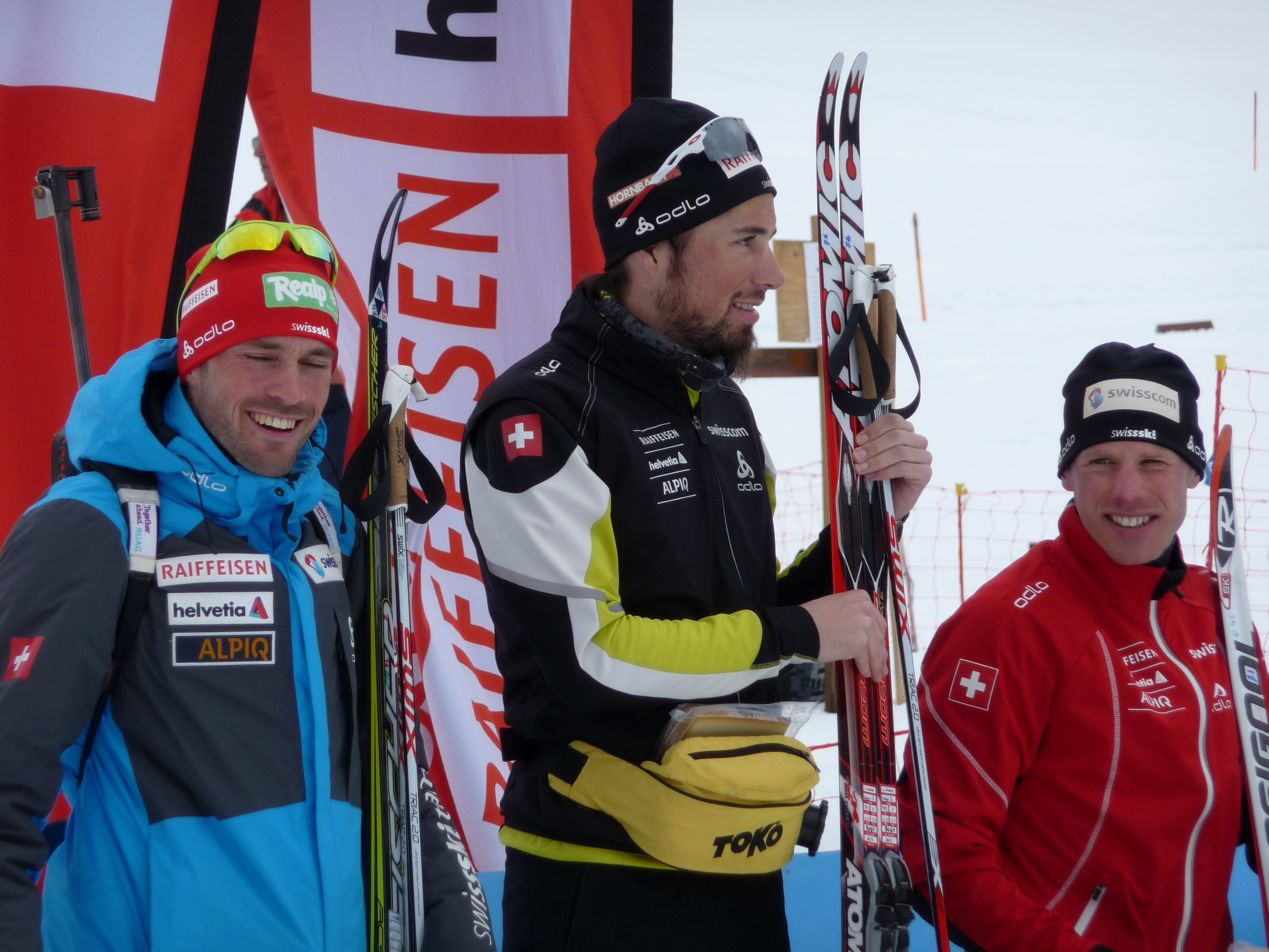
- Christian Stebler (left) in 2013

Personal information
- Nationality: Swiss
- Born: 23 April 1981 (age 45) Switzerland
- Height: 176 cm (5 ft 9 in)
- Weight: 76 kg (168 lb; 12 st 0 lb)

Sport
- Sport: Cross-country skiing

Achievements and titles
- Olympic finals: 2006 Winter Olympics

Christian Stebler (born 23 April 1981) is a Swiss cross-country skier. He competed in the men's 15 kilometre classical event at the 2006 Winter Olympics.
