= Andrew Johnson (skier) =

American cross-country skier

Andrew Johnson is a cross-country skier from the United States. He was born and raised in Greensboro, Vermont, and is a member of the U.S. 2006 Olympic Cross-Country Ski Team. He has been a Junior National Champ, an Overall "Supertour Champ", and a three-time All American. He is a four-time national champion, winning at the 2005 and 2006 championships, both held in Soldier Hollow, Utah.

After attending Middlebury College, Johnson signed with Madshus skis, Alpina boots, and Rottefella bindings. He is still skiing for these sponsors today, as well as for the U.S. Ski Team, and ski wax and ski pole manufacturer Swix.

Johnson is currently the head Nordic ski coach at Middlebury.
