= Vicenç Vilarrubla =

Spanish cross-country skier (born 1981)

Vicenç Vilarrubla Solsona (born 31 January 1981 in la Seu d'Urgell) is a Catalan Spanish cross-country skier from Bellestar (Alt Urgell) who has competed in the World Cup since 2001. Vilarrubla competed in four FIS Nordic World Ski Championships from 2003 to 2009 and at 2006 and 2010 Winter Olympics. Vilarrubla's best Olympic results are 31st places in 30 km pursuit events in 2006 and 2010. His best World Championships result is a 27th place at the 15 km event in Oberstdorf in 2005, and his best World Cup result is a 17th place at a 15 km event in Changchun in 2007.
