= Gion-Andrea Bundi =

Swiss cross-country skier

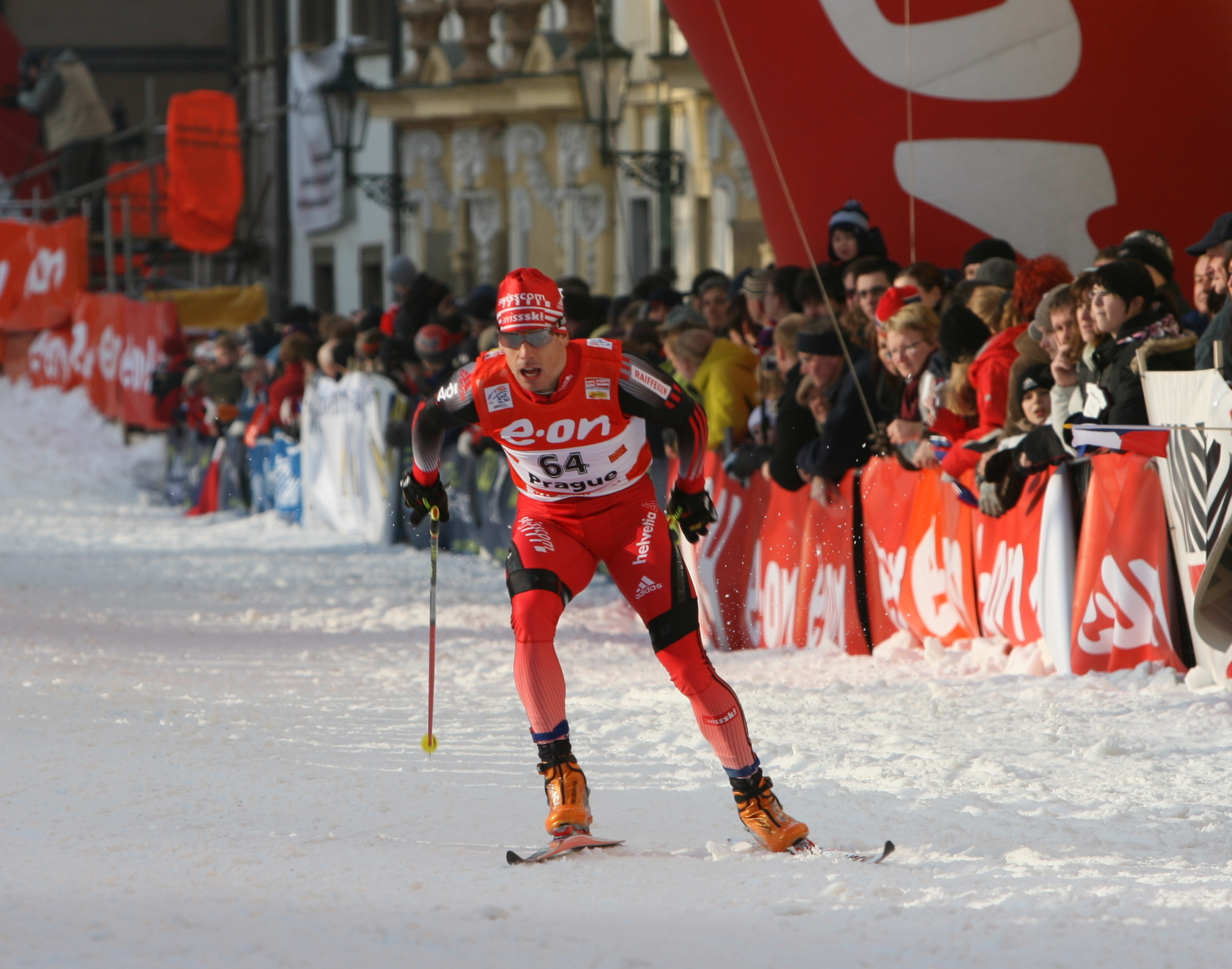
- Gion-Andrea Bundi in 2007

Personal information
- Nationality: Swiss
- Born: 18 May 1976 (age 49) Thal, Switzerland

Sport
- Sport: Cross-country skiing

Gion-Andrea Bundi (born 18 May 1976) is a Swiss cross-country skier. He competed in the men's 30 kilometre freestyle mass start event at the 2002 Winter Olympics.
