= Kaspar Kokk =

Estonian cross-country skier (born 1982)

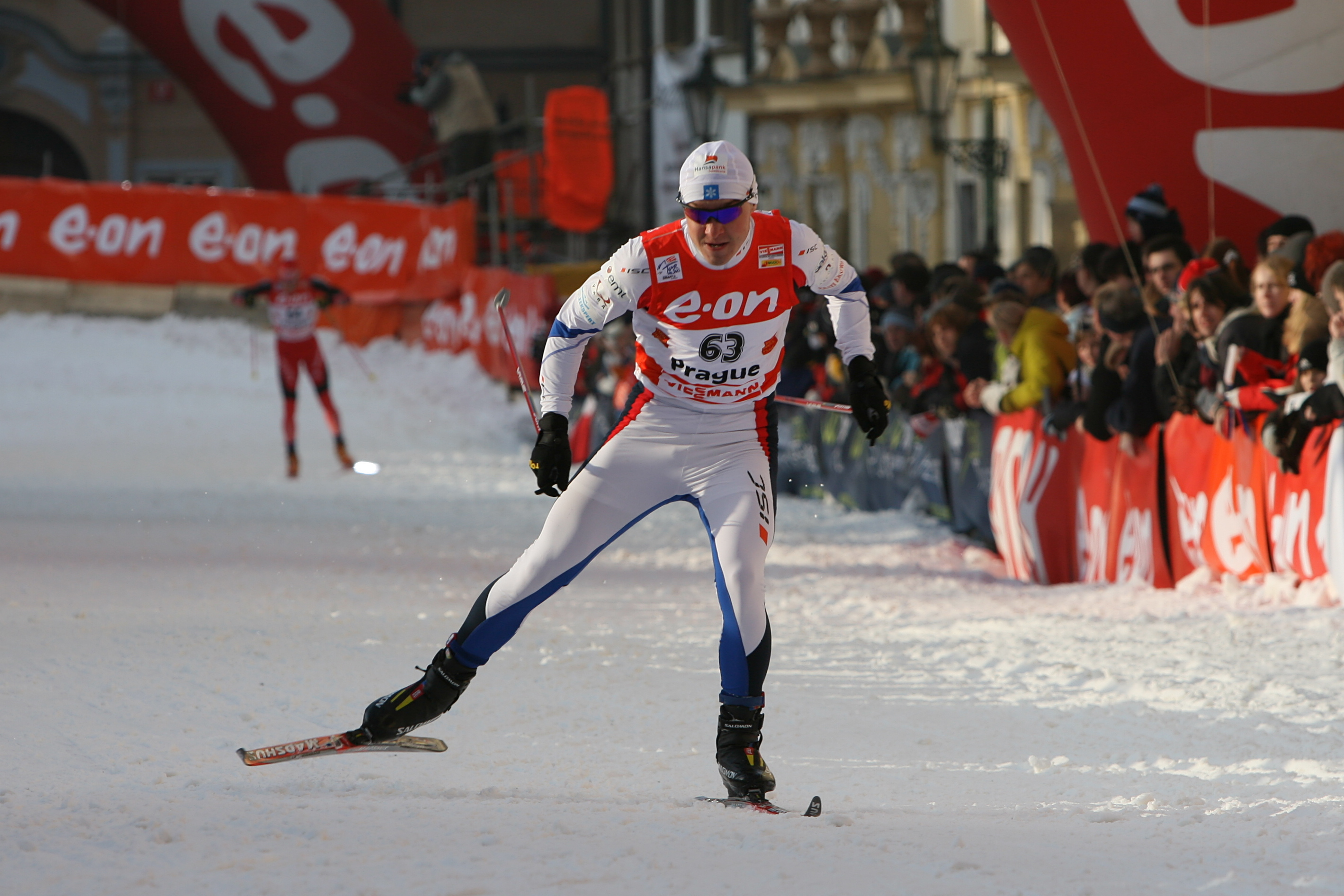
Kaspar Kokk at Tour de Ski in 2007.

Kaspar Kokk (born August 3, 1982, in Tartu) is an Estonian cross-country skier. He competed at the 2006 Winter Olympics in Turin. He represents Estonia at the 2010 Winter Olympics in Vancouver, British Columbia, Canada. Kokk's best finish was 8th in the 4 x 10 km relay at the 2006 Games.

His best finish was the FIS Nordic World Ski Championships was eighth in the 4 x 10 km relay at Liberec in 2009. Kokk's best World Cup finish was 11th in a 4 x 10 km relay at Norway in November 2009 while his best individual finish was 16th in a 15 km +15 km double pursuit event in Germany in 2006.
