= Dan Roycroft =

Canadian cross-country skier (born 1978)

Dan Roycroft (born February 23, 1978) is a Canadian cross-country skier who has been competing since 1998. He has competed in the 2003, 2005, and 2007 FIS Nordic World Ski Championships with his best placings being 29th in the 50 km event in 2007 and 31st in the 50 km in 2005.

Roycroft competed in the 2006 Winter Olympics, earning his best finish of 39th in the 15 km + 15 km double pursuit. His best FIS World Cup result is 15th in the 15 km + 15 km double pursuit in Whistler Olympic Park, Canada in 2009. He has 4 national championships in his career with two in 2003 (30 km classic & 50 km classic) one in 2006 (15 km skate), and one in 2007 (10 km Skate).
