= FIS Nordic World Ski Championships 2007 – Men's sprint =

Men's sprint at the FIS Nordic World Ski Championships 2007
- Venue: Sapporo Dome
- Date: 22 February 2007
- Competitors: 83 from 39 nations

Medalists
gold medal	Jens Arne Svartedal	Norway
silver medal	Mats Larsson	Sweden
bronze medal	Eldar Rønning	Norway

The men's sprint cross-country skiing competition at the FIS Nordic World Ski Championships 2007 was held on 22 February 2007 in the Sapporo Dome.

== Results ==
=== Qualification ===
83 competitors started the qualification race.

Rank	Bib	Athlete	Country	Time	Deficit	Note
1	9	Andrew Newell	United States	3:04.71	—	Q
2	1	Odd-Bjørn Hjelmeset	Norway	3:04.93	+0.22	Q
3	10	Emil Jönsson	Sweden	3:05.68	+0.97	Q
4	4	Eldar Rønning	Norway	3:05.81	+1.10	Q
5	40	Mats Larsson	Sweden	3:06.14	+1.43	Q
6	17	Björn Lind	Sweden	3:06.25	+1.54	Q
7	3	Jens Arne Svartedal	Norway	3:06.80	+2.09	Q
	36	Yevgeniy Koschevoy	Kazakhstan	DSQ		
8	5	Vasily Rochev	Russia	3:07.40	+2.69	Q
9	41	Mikhail Devyatyarov	Russia	3:07.64	+2.93	Q
10	27	Kalle Lassila	Finland	3:07.71	+3.00	Q
11	35	Matias Strandvall	Finland	3:07.79	+3.08	Q
12	2	Janusz Krezelok	Poland	3:08.29	+3.58	Q
13	7	Nikolay Morilov	Russia	3:08.48	+3.77	Q
14	11	Torin Koos	United States	3:09.24	+4.53	Q
15	29	Cyril Miranda	France	3:09.79	+5.08	Q
16	26	Lauri Pyykönen	Finland	3:10.27	+5.56	Q
17	6	Petter Myhlback	Sweden	3:11.20	+6.49	Q
18	24	Dusan Kozisek	Czech Republic	3:11.21	+6.50	Q
19	14	Yuichi Onda	Japan	3:12.04	+7.33	Q
20	18	Loris Frasnelli	Italy	3:12.39	+7.68	Q
21	43	Sergey Cherepanov	Kazakhstan	3:12.89	+8.18	Q
22	51	Alexey Poltoranin	Kazakhstan	3:12.99	+8.28	Q
23	12	Tor Arne Hetland	Norway	3:13.07	+8.36	Q
24	32	Nikolay Chebotko	Kazakhstan	3:13.18	+8.47	Q
25	33	Thomas Stöggl	Austria	3:13.76	+9.05	Q
26	30	Maciej Kreczmer	Poland	3:13.92	+9.21	Q
27	21	Priit Narusk	Estonia	3:14.22	+9.51	Q
28	37	Timo Simonlatser	Estonia	3:14.53	+9.82	Q
29	8	Josef Wenzl	Germany	3:14.55	+9.84	Q
30	31	Sean Crooks	Canada	3:14.75	+10.04	
31	25	Chris Cook	United States	3:14.90	+10.19	
32	50	Osamu Yamagishi	Japan	3:15.42	+10.71	
33	20	Christoph Eigenmann	Switzerland	3:16.10	+11.39	
34	57	Olexandr Putsko	Ukraine	3:17.11	+12.40	
35	52	Roman Leybyuk	Ukraine	3:17.44	+12.73	
36	44	Martin Otcenas	Slovakia	3:17.51	+12.80	
37	55	Paul Murray	Australia	3:17.54	+12.83	
38	22	Devon Kershaw	Canada	3:18.39	+13.68	
39	38	Stefan Kuhn	Canada	3:18.45	+13.74	
40	23	Harald Wurm	Austria	3:18.80	+14.09	
41	53	Xia Wan	China	3:19.03	+14.32	
42	28	Lefteris Fafalis	Greece	3:19.24	+14.53	
43	16	Martin Stockinger	Austria	3:20.64	+15.93	
44	34	Nejc Brodar	Slovenia	3:22.03	+17.32	
45	54	Mikhail Gumenyak	Ukraine	3:22.53	+17.82	
46	45	Oliver Kraas	South Africa	3:22.77	+18.06	
47	42	Lars Flora	United States	3:22.97	+18.26	
48	47	Qinghai Sun	China	3:24.68	+19.97	
49	49	Ben Sim	Australia	3:25.34	+20.63	
50	69	Aleksey Ivanov	Belarus	3:26.44	+21.37	
51	61	Francesc Soulie	Andorra	3:26.72	+22.01	
52	48	Zoltan Tagscherer	Hungary	3:28.56	+23.85	
53	63	Vitaly Shtun	Ukraine	3:30.34	+25.63	
54	83	Zsolt Antal	Romania	3:30.50	+25.79	
55	71	Hak-Jin Kim	South Korea	3:30.83	+26.12	
56	73	Daniel Kuzmin	Israel	3:31.00	+26.29	
57	64	Veselin Tzinzov	Bulgaria	3:31.80	+27.09	
58	62	Wenyou Bian	China	3:32.93	+28.22	
59	58	Sebahattin Oglago	Turkey	3:35.88	+31.17	
60	59	Kari Peters	Luxembourg	3:37.10	+32.39	
61	80	Imre Tagscherer	Hungary	3:37.66	+32.95	
62	60	Muhammet Kizilarslan	Turkey	3:38.76	+34.05	
63	39	Phil Widmer	Canada	3:39.05	+34.34	
64	56	Wang Songtao	China	3:39.93	+35.22	
65	65	Matyas Hollo	Hungary	3:42.93	+39.22	
66	82	Csaba Cseke	Hungary	3:44.63	+39.92	
67	67	Hovhannes Sargsyan	Armenia	3:44.87	+40.16	
68	70	Karapet Sahradyan	Armenia	3:45.57	+40.86	
69	81	Grigoris Moschovakos	Greece	3:47.83	+43.12	
70	72	Mayis Soghoyan	Armenia	4:02.52	+57.81	
71	74	Nikos Kalofyris	Greece	4:03.51	+58.80	
72	75	Armen Meliqyan	Armenia	4:05.79	+1:01.08	
73	66	Alan Eason	United Kingdom	4:07.81	+1:03.10	
74	76	Robel Teklemariam	Ethiopia	4:19.95	+1:15.24	
75	79	Helio Freitas	Brazil	4:38.84	+1:34.13	
76	77	Rory Morrish	Ireland	4:40.19	+1:35.48	
77	68	Danny Silva	Portugal	4:45.74	+1:41.03	
78	78	Philip Boit	Kenya	4:59.19	+1:54.48	
	13	Renato Pasini	Italy	DSQ		
	15	Peeter Kummel	Estonia	DSQ		
	19	Roddy Darragon	France	DSQ		
	46	Sergey Shiryayev	Russia	DSQ		

=== Quarterfinals ===
Q - Qualified for next round
PF - Photo Finish
LL - Lucky Loser - qualified for next round due to their times

Quarterfinal 1

Rank	Seed	Athlete	Country	Time	Deficit	Note
1	11	Kalle Lassila	Finland	3:08.2	—	Q
2	1	Andrew Newell	United States	3:09.1	+0.9	Q
3	30	Josef Wenzl	Germany	3:09.2	+1.0	14th
4	10	Mikhail Devyatyarov	Russia	3:09.6	+1.4	15th
5	21	Loris Frasnelli	Italy	3:12.9	+4.7	23rd
6	20	Yuichi Onda	Japan	3:58.7	+50.5	25th

Quarterfinal 2

Rank	Seed	Athlete	Country	Time	Deficit	Note
1	7	Jens Arne Svartedal	Norway	3:03.8	—	Q
2	4	Eldar Rønning	Norway	3:04.1	+0.3	Q
3	17	Lauri Pyykönen	Finland	3:06.1	+2.3	13th
4	24	Tor Arne Hetland	Norway	3:06.6	+2.8	18th
5	14	Nikolay Morilov	Russia	3:08.4	+4.6	20th
6	27	Maciej Kreczmer	Poland	3:11.1	+7.3	28th

Quarterfinal 3

Rank	Seed	Athlete	Country	Time	Deficit	Note
1	6	Björn Lind	Sweden	3:02.3	—	Q
2	5	Mats Larsson	Sweden	3:02.5	+0.3	Q
3	16	Cyril Miranda	France	3:06.7	+4.4	12th
4	25	Nikolay Chebotko	Kazakhstan	3:07.1	+4.8	19th
5	15	Torin Koos	United States	3:12.9	+10.6	21st
6	26	Thomas Stöggl	Austria	3:15.2	+12.9	27th

Quarterfinal 4

Rank	Seed	Athlete	Country	Time	Deficit	Note
1	2	Odd-Bjørn Hjelmeset	Norway	3:03.8	—	Q PF
2	9	Vasily Rochev	Russia	3:03.8	+0.0	Q PF
3	12	Matias Strandvall	Finland	3:04.9	+1.1	LL
4	19	Dusan Kozisek	Czech Republic	3:06.1	+2.3	16th
5	29	Timo Simonlatser	Estonia	3:06.3	+2.5	24th
6	22	Sergey Cherepanov	Kazakhstan	3:10.7	+6.9	26th

Quarterfinal 5

Rank	Seed	Athlete	Country	Time	Deficit	Note
1	3	Emil Jönsson	Sweden	3:05.0	—	Q
2	8	Yevgeniy Koschevoy	Kazakhstan	3:05.9	+0.4	Q
3	13	Janusz Krezelok	Poland	3:05.6	+0.6	LL
4	23	Alexey Poltoranin	Kazakhstan	3:08.2	+3.2	17th
5	18	Petter Myhlback	Sweden	3:09.9	+4.9	22nd
6	28	Priit Narusk	Estonia	3:10.3	+5.3	29th

=== Semifinals ===
Semifinal 1

Rank	Seed	Athlete	Country	Time	Deficit	Note
1	5	Mats Larsson	Sweden	3:01.2	—	QA PF
2	7	Jens Arne Svartedal	Norway	3:01.3	+0.1	QA PF
3	1	Andrew Newell	United States	3:02.4	+1.2	QA LL
4	4	Eldar Rønning	Norway	3:03.2	+2.0	QA LL
5	12	Matias Strandvall	Finland	3:18.9	+17.7	QB PF
6	11	Kalle Lassila	Finland	3:18.9	+17.7	QB PF

Semifinal 2

Rank	Seed	Athlete	Country	Time	Deficit	Note
1	3	Emil Jönsson	Sweden	3:05.7	—	QA
2	6	Björn Lind	Sweden	3:06.4	+0.7	QA
3	2	Odd-Bjørn Hjelmeset	Norway	3:07.7	+2.2	QB
4	9	Vasily Rochev	Russia	3:09.5	+3.8	QB
5	13	Janusz Krezelok	Poland	3:12.0	+6.3	QB
6	8	Yevgeniy Koschevoy	Kazakhstan	3:12.5	+6.8	QB

=== Finals ===
Final A

Rank	Seed	Athlete	Country	Time	Deficit	Note
1st place, gold medalist(s)	7	Jens Arne Svartedal	Norway	3:03.8	—	1st
2nd place, silver medalist(s)	5	Mats Larsson	Sweden	3:04.0	+0.2	2nd
3rd place, bronze medalist(s)	4	Eldar Rønning	Norway	3:04.6	+0.8	3rd
4	6	Björn Lind	Sweden	3:05.0	+1.2	4th
5	1	Andrew Newell	United States	3:09.4	+5.6	5th
6	3	Emil Jönsson	Sweden	3:47.6	+43.8	6th

Final B

Rank	Seed	Athlete	Country	Time	Deficit	Note
1	2	Odd-Bjørn Hjelmeset	Norway	3:09.9	—	7th PF
2	9	Vasily Rochev	Russia	3:10.0	+0.1	8th PF
3	12	Matias Strandvall	Finland	3:11.0	+1.1	9th PF
4	13	Janusz Krezelok	Poland	3:11.0	+1.1	10th PF
5	11	Kalle Lassila	Finland	3:12.8	+2.9	11th
6	8	Yevgeniy Koschevoy	Kazakhstan	3:14.4	+4.5	DSQ
