= FIS Nordic World Ski Championships 2005 – Men's sprint =

Men's sprint at the FIS Nordic World Ski Championships 2005
- Venue: Oberstdorf
- Date: 22 February 2005
- Competitors: 89 from 40 nations

Medalists
gold medal	Vasily Rochev	Russia
silver medal	Tor Arne Hetland	Norway
bronze medal	Thobias Fredriksson	Sweden

The men's sprint cross-country skiing competition at the FIS Nordic World Ski Championships 2005 was held on 22 February 2005 in Oberstdorf, Germany.

== Results ==
=== Qualification ===
89 competitors started the qualification race.

Rank	Bib	Athlete	Country	Time	Deficit	Note
1	46	Vasily Rochev	Russia	2:33.52	—	Q
2	40	Björn Lind	Sweden	2:34.25	+0.73	Q
3	26	Nikolay Chebotko	Kazakhstan	2:34.26	+0.74	Q
4	13	Mats Larsson	Sweden	2:34.97	+1.45	Q
5	49	Tor Arne Hetland	Norway	2:35.83	+2.31	Q
6	37	Trond Iversen	Norway	2:35.87	+2.35	Q
7	41	Thobias Fredriksson	Sweden	2:35.90	+2.38	Q
8	30	Lauri Pyykönen	Finland	2:36.20	+2.68	Q
9	45	Odd-Bjørn Hjelmeset	Norway	2:36.39	+2.87	Q
10	35	Anti Saarepuu	Estonia	2:36.65	+3.13	Q
11	48	Janusz Krezelok	Poland	2:36.78	+3.26	Q
12	42	Eldar Rønning	Norway	2:37.02	+3.50	Q
13	21	Devon Kershaw	Canada	2:37.03	+3.51	Q
14	34	Keijo Kurttila	Finland	2:37.09	+3.57	Q
15	29	Priit Narusk	Estonia	2:38.37	+4.85	Q
16	28	Andrew Newell	United States	2:38.40	+4.88	Q
17	23	Maciej Kreczmer	Poland	2:38.42	+4.90	
18	10	Andreas Schlütter	Germany	2:38.97	+5.45	
19	18	George Grey	Canada	2:39.04	+5.52	
20	2	Franz Göring	Germany	2:39.07	+5.55	
21	20	Drew Goldsack	Canada	2:39.82	+6.30	
22	5	Yevgeniy Koschevoy	Kazakhstan	2:40.20	+6.68	
23	24	Fabio Pasini	Italy	2:40.24	+6.72	
24	44	Fredrik Östberg	Sweden	2:40.26	+6.74	
25	31	Jari Joutsen	Finland	2:40.42	+6.90	
26	32	Loris Frasnelli	Italy	2:40.45	+6.93	
27	47	Jörgen Brink	Sweden	2:40.60	+7.08	
28	55	Vitaly Martsyv	Ukraine	2:40.73	+7.21	
29	50	Christoph Eigenmann	Switzerland	2:40.74	+7.22	
30	43	Renato Pasini	Italy	2:40.88	+7.36	
31	17	Paul Murray	Australia	2:41.11	+7.59	
32	25	Torin Koos	United States	2:41.39	+7.87	
33	38	Freddy Schwienbacher	Italy	2:41.49	+7.97	
34	39	Ivan Alypov	Russia	2:41.54	+8.02	
35	51	Roddy Darragon	France	2:42.83	+9.31	
36	52	Li Geliang	China	2:43.17	+9.65	
37	6	Gordon Jewett	Canada	2:43.24	+9.72	
38	19	Dusan Kozisek	Czech Republic	2:43.28	+9.76	
39	56	Roman Leybyuk	Ukraine	2:43.36	+9.84	
40	27	Lefteris Fafalis	Greece	2:43.49	+9.97	
41	14	Shunsuke Komamura	Japan	2:43.83	+10.31	
42	11	Nejc Brodar	Slovenia	2:44.09	+10.57	
43	9	Stanislav Holenčík	Slovakia	2:44.16	+10.64	
44	33	Peter von Allmen	Switzerland	2:45.37	+11.85	
45	15	Benoît Chauvet	France	2:45.40	+11.88	
46	68	Mikhail Gumenyak	Ukraine	2:46.39	+12.87	
47	3	Michal Malak	Slovakia	2:46.40	+12.88	
48	1	Andrey Kondroschev	Kazakhstan	2:47.24	+13.72	
49	16	Martin Møller	Denmark	2:48.51	+14.99	
50	8	Alexander Legkov	Russia	2:48.60	+15.08	
51	53	Tian Ye	China	2:48.92	+15.40	
52	54	Lars Flora	United States	2:48.96	+15.44	
53	7	Artem Norin	Russia	2:49.19	+15.67	
54	57	Ben Sim	Australia	2:50.39	+16.87	
55	59	Alexey Ivanov	Belarus	2:50.50	+16.98	
56	22	Thomas Stöggl	Austria	2:50.76	+17.24	
57	69	Olexandr Putsko	Ukraine	2:51.42	+17.90	
58	64	Mihai Galiteanu	Romania	2:51.67	+18.15	
59	4	Oliver Kraas	South Africa	2:51.86	+18.34	
60	67	Zhiguang Li	China	2:52.51	+18.99	
61	62	Dawei Han	China	2:53.34	+19.82	
62	60	Aleksei Novoselki	Lithuania	2:53.54	+20.02	
63	61	Sebastian Sørensen	Denmark	2:55.64	+22.12	
64	12	Zoltan Tagscherer	Hungary	2:55.73	+22.21	
65	58	Denis Klobučar	Croatia	2:57.90	+24.38	
66	71	Andrew Mock	Australia	2:58.42	+24.90	
67	66	Damir Jurčević	Croatia	2:59.65	+26.13	
68	72	Jakob Jakobsson	Iceland	3:00.15	+26.63	
69	65	Daniel Kuzmin	Israel	3:00.89	+27.37	
70	70	Ivan Bariakov	Bulgaria	3:01.77	+28.25	
71	63	Ben Derrick	Australia	3:02.93	+29.41	
72	89	Khurebaatar Khah-Erdene	Mongolia	3:03.51	+29.99	
73	73	Muhammet Kizilarslan	Turkey	3:06.16	+32.64	
74	75	Veselin Tzinzov	Bulgaria	3:09.02	+35.50	
75	83	Csaba Cseke	Hungary	3:09.95	+36.43	
76	79	Hovhannes Sargsyan	Armenia	3:10.49	+36.97	
77	76	Martin Bianchi	Argentina	3:12.00	+38.48	
78	86	Edmond Khachatryan	Armenia	3:14.80	+41.28	
79	78	Alan Eason	Great Britain	3:16.15	+42.63	
80	36	Erki Jallai	Estonia	3:18.02	+44.50	
80	80	Burhan Oglago	Turkey	3:18.02	+44.50	
82	74	Matyas Hollo	Hungary	3:18.09	+44.57	
83	88	Igor Ilieski	Macedonia	3:23.51	+49.99	
84	82	Berau Ferreira	South Africa	3:27.72	+54.20	
85	77	Gjoko Icoski	Macedonia	3:32.14	+58.62	
86	81	Borce Jovanoski	Macedonia	3:45.20	+1:11.68	
87	87	Ile Spaseski	Macedonia	3:48.87	+1:15.35	
88	84	Danny Silva	Portugal	4:27.76	+1:54.24	
89	85	Helio Freitas	Brazil	4:38.41	+2:04.89	

=== Quarterfinals ===
Q - Qualified for next round
PF - Photo Finish

==== Quarterfinal 1 ====
Rank	Seed	Athlete	Country	Time	Deficit	Note
1	1	Vasily Rochev	Russia	2:33.9	—	Q
2	9	Odd-Bjørn Hjelmeset	Norway	2:35.0	+1.1	Q
3	16	Andrew Newell	United States	2:36.1	+2.2	12th PF
4	8	Lauri Pyykönen	Finland	2:36.2	+2.3	13th PF

==== Quarterfinal 2 ====
Rank	Seed	Athlete	Country	Time	Deficit	Note
1	5	Tor Arne Hetland	Norway	2:33.5	—	Q
2	4	Mats Larsson	Sweden	2:33.9	+0.4	Q
3	12	Eldar Rønning	Norway	2:31.4	+0.1	11th
4	13	Devon Kershaw	Canada	2:37.9	+4.4	14th

==== Quarterfinal 3 ====
Rank	Seed	Athlete	Country	Time	Deficit	Note
1	7	Thobias Fredriksson	Sweden	2:32.3	—	Q
2	2	Björn Lind	Sweden	2:32.5	+0.2	Q
3	10	Anti Saarepuu	Estonia	2:32.9	+0.6	10th
4	15	Priit Narusk	Estonia	2:38.2	+5.9	16th

==== Quarterfinal 4 ====
Rank	Seed	Athlete	Country	Time	Deficit	Note
1	3	Nikolay Chebotko	Kazakhstan	2:33.1	—	Q
2	11	Janusz Krezelok	Poland	2:33.3	+0.2	Q PF
3	6	Trond Iversen	Norway	2:33.3	+0.2	9th PF
4	14	Keijo Kurttila	Finland	2:33.4	+0.3	15th

=== Semifinals ===
==== Semifinal 1 ====
Rank	Seed	Athlete	Country	Time	Deficit	Note
1	5	Tor Arne Hetland	Norway	2:31.3	—	QA PF
2	1	Vasily Rochev	Russia	2:31.4	+0.1	QA PF
3	9	Odd-Bjørn Hjelmeset	Norway	2:31.4	+0.1	QB PF
4	4	Mats Larsson	Sweden	2:37.9	+6.6	QB

==== Semifinal 2 ====
Rank	Seed	Athlete	Country	Time	Deficit	Note
1	7	Thobias Fredriksson	Sweden	2:37.4	—	QA
2	2	Björn Lind	Sweden	2:37.9	+0.5	QA
3	3	Nikolay Chebotko	Kazakhstan	2:38.7	+1.3	QB
4	11	Janusz Krezelok	Poland	2:41.1	+3.7	QB

=== Finals ===
==== Final A ====
Rank	Seed	Athlete	Country	Time	Deficit	Note
1st place, gold medalist(s)	1	Vasily Rochev	Russia	2:32.1	—	1st
2nd place, silver medalist(s)	5	Tor Arne Hetland	Norway	2:32.3	+0.2	2nd
3rd place, bronze medalist(s)	7	Thobias Fredriksson	Sweden	2:39.0	+6.9	3rd
4	2	Björn Lind	Sweden	3:15.9	+43.8	4th

==== Final B ====
Rank	Seed	Athlete	Country	Time	Deficit	Note
1	9	Odd-Bjørn Hjelmeset	Norway	2:36.0	—	5th PF
2	4	Mats Larsson	Sweden	2:36.1	+0.1	6th PF
3	11	Janusz Krezelok	Poland	2:42.9	+6.9	7th
4	3	Nikolay Chebotko	Kazakhstan	2:48.4	+12.4	8th
