= Cross-country skiing at the 2006 Winter Olympics – Men's sprint =

Men's sprint at the XX Olympic Winter Games
- Venue: Pragelato
- Dates: 22 February 2006
- Competitors: 80 from 34 nations

Medalists
1st place, gold medalist(s)		Björn Lind	Sweden
2nd place, silver medalist(s)		Roddy Darragon	France
3rd place, bronze medalist(s)		Thobias Fredriksson	Sweden

The men's sprint cross-country skiing competition at the 2006 Winter Olympics in Turin, Italy, was held on 22 February at Pragelato.

Vasily Rochev was the defending world champion at this event, but he won in the classical style. The last free style sprint at the World Championships was won by Thobias Fredriksson in 2003, while Tor Arne Hetland was defending Olympic champion. Swede Björn Lind won the two most recent World Cup events, and also won the Olympic race, beating Frenchman Roddy Darragon to the line. Darragon won France's first cross-country skiing medal in the history of the Olympics, while Sweden took the bronze through Thobias Fredriksson.

== Results ==
=== Qualifying ===
Eighty skiers completed the 1.3 kilometre course in the qualifying portion of the event, with the top thirty advancing to the quarterfinals.

Rank	Name	Country	Time	Notes
1	Björn Lind	Sweden	2:13.53	Q
2	Andrew Newell	United States	2:14.79	Q
3	Johan Kjølstad	Norway	2:15.11	Q
4	Vasily Rochev	Russia	2:16.19	Q
5	Cristian Zorzi	Italy	2:16.23	Q
6	Mikael Östberg	Sweden	2:16.24	Q
7	Trond Iversen	Norway	2:16.25	Q
8	Loris Frasnelli	Italy	2:16.30	Q
9	Peter Larsson	Sweden	2:16.62	Q
10	Roddy Darragon	France	2:16.76	Q
11	Renato Pasini	Italy	2:16.87	Q
12	Ola Vigen Hattestad	Norway	2:17.26	Q
13	Yuichi Onda	Japan	2:17.53	Q
14	Anti Saarepuu	Estonia	2:17:75	Q
15	Tor Arne Hetland	Norway	2:17.91	Q
16	Chris Cook	United States	2:18.46	Q
17	Freddy Schwienbacher	Italy	2:18.59	Q
18	Yevgeniy Koschevoy	Kazakhstan	2:18.88	Q
19	Thobias Fredriksson	Sweden	2:18.90	Q
20	Martin Koukal	Czech Republic	2:19.39	Q
21	Dušan Kožíšek	Czech Republic	2:19.64	Q
22	Keijo Kurttila	Finland	2:19.94	Q
23	Janusz Krężelok	Poland	2:20.04	Q
24	Harald Wurm	Austria	2:20.11	Q
25	Martin Stockinger	Austria	2:20.18	Q
26	Lauri Pyykönen	Finland	2:20.21	Q
27	Ivan Alypov	Russia	2:20.21	Q
28	Sergey Novikov	Russia	2:20.29	Q
29	Lefteris Fafalis	Greece	2:20.33	Q
30	Christoph Eigenmann	Switzerland	2:20.46	Q
31	Drew Goldsack	Canada	2:20.62	
32	Sean Crooks	Canada	2:20.70	
33	Maciej Kreczmer	Poland	2:20.83	
34	Pavel Korostelev	Russia	2:21.00	
35	Nikolay Chebotko	Kazakhstan	2:21.23	
36	Torin Koos	United States	2:21.47	
37	Devon Kershaw	Canada	2:21.49	
38	Peeter Kümmel	Estonia	2:21.60	
39	Nejc Brodar	Slovenia	2:21.94	
40	Ivan Bilosyuk	Ukraine	2:21.97	
41	Priit Narusk	Estonia	2:22.19	
42	Vitaly Martsyv	Ukraine	2:22.30	
43	Shunsuke Komamura	Japan	2:22.38	
44	Zoltan Tagscherer	Hungary	2:22.69	
45	Yevgeni Safonov	Kazakhstan	2:22.99	
46	Lars Flora	United States	2:23.02	
47	Phil Widmer	Canada	2:23.79	
48	Zhang Chengye	China	2:24.18	
49	Martin Otcenas	Slovakia	2:24.77	
50	Oļegs Maļuhins	Latvia	2:24.88	
51	Paul Murray	Australia	2:25.29	
52	Alexander Lasutkin	Belarus	2:25.79	
53	Tian Ye	China	2:25.85	
54	Aivar Rehemaa	Estonia	2:26.09	
55	Sergey Cherepanov	Kazakhstan	2:26.48	
56	Joze Mehle	Slovenia	2:27.02	
57	Oliver Kraas	South Africa	2:27.68	
58	Zhang Qing	China	2:27.90	
59	Aleksej Novoselskij	Lithuania	2:28.04	
60	Damir Jurcevic	Croatia	2:28.21	
61	Sami Jauhojärvi	Finland	2:28.42	
62	Mikhail Gumenyak	Ukraine	2:28.72	
63	Park Byung Joo	South Korea	2:28.85	
64	Muhammet Kızılarslan	Turkey	2:28.94	
65	Zsolt Antal	Romania	2:29.40	
66	Olexandr Putsko	Ukraine	2:30.99	
67	Sabahattin Oglago	Turkey	2:31.10	
68	Valts Eiduks	Latvia	2:31.25	
69	Mihai Galiceanu	Romania	2:31.43	
70	Chen Haibin	China	2:32.01	
71	Ivan Bariakov	Bulgaria	2:32.18	
72	Intars Spalviņš	Latvia	2:32.26	
73	Denis Klobucar	Croatia	2:33.10	
74	Olegs Andrejevs	Latvia	2:33.23	
75	Alen Abramovic	Croatia	2:34.61	
76	Jung Eui Myung	South Korea	2:35.39	
77	Ilie Bria	Moldova	2:42.30	
78	Bahadur Gupta	India	2:43.30	
79	Hovhannes Sargsyan	Armenia	2:47.68	
80	Edmond Khachatryan	Armenia	2:49.98	

=== Quarterfinals ===
There were five quarterfinal races, each with six skiers. The top two in each heat advanced to the semifinals.

Quarterfinal 1

Rank	Seed	Athlete	Result	Notes
1	1	Björn Lind (SWE)	2:21.5	Q
2	10	Roddy Darragon (FRA)	2:21.9	Q
3	20	Martin Koukal (CZE)	2:23.5	
4	11	Renato Pasini (ITA)	2:23.7	
5	21	Dušan Kožíšek (CZE)	2:24.5	
6	30	Christoph Eigenmann (SUI)	2:25.6	

Quarterfinal 2

Rank	Seed	Athlete	Result	Notes
1	17	Freddy Schwienbacher (ITA)	2:20.4	Q
2	14	Anti Saarepuu (EST)	2:20.7	Q
3	4	Vasily Rochev (RUS)	2:22.0	
4	7	Trond Iversen (NOR)	2:22.5	
5	24	Harald Wurm (AUT)	2:23.4	
6	27	Ivan Alypov (RUS)	2:24.7	

Quarterfinal 3

Rank	Seed	Athlete	Result	Notes
1	5	Cristian Zorzi (ITA)	2:25.9	Q
2	15	Tor Arne Hetland (NOR)	2:26.1	Q
3	6	Mikael Östberg (SWE)	2:26.7	
4	25	Martin Stockinger (AUT)	2:27.1	
5	16	Chris Cook (USA)	2:27.9	
6	26	Lauri Pyykönen (FIN)	2:28.1	

Quarterfinal 4

Rank	Seed	Athlete	Result	Notes
1	12	Ola Vigen Hattestad (NOR)	2:23.1	Q
2	19	Thobias Fredriksson (SWE)	2:23.2	Q
3	9	Peter Larsson (SWE)	2:23.3	
4	2	Andrew Newell (USA)	2:24.3	
5	22	Keijo Kurttila (FIN)	2:25.1	
6	29	Lefteris Fafalis (GRE)	2:26.7	

Quarterfinal 5

Rank	Seed	Athlete	Result	Notes
1	3	Johan Kjølstad (NOR)	2:20.2	Q
2	8	Loris Frasnelli (ITA)	2:20.4	Q
3	18	Yevgeniy Koschevoy (KAZ)	2:20.7	
4	23	Janusz Krężelok (POL)	2:21.6	
5	28	Sergei Novikov (RUS)	2:21.9	
6	13	Yuichi Onda (JPN)	2:22.3	

=== Semifinals ===
There were two semifinal races, each with five skiers. The top two in each semifinal advanced to the A Final, to compete for the top four places, while the third and fourth placed finishers advanced to the B Final, for places five through eight.

Semifinal 1

Rank	Seed	Athlete	Result	Notes
1	1	Björn Lind (SWE)	2:19.6	Q
2	10	Roddy Darragon (FRA)	2:19.9	Q
3	17	Freddy Schwienbacher (ITA)	2:22.8	
4	14	Anti Saarepuu (EST)	2:34.8	
5	15	Tor Arne Hetland (NOR)	2:43.2	

Semifinal 2

Rank	Seed	Athlete	Result	Notes
1	19	Thobias Fredriksson (SWE)	2:25.9	Q
2	5	Cristian Zorzi (ITA)	2:26.1	Q
3	8	Loris Frasnelli (ITA)	2:26.8	
4	3	Johan Kjølstad (NOR)	2:27.1	
5	12	Ola Vigen Hattestad (NOR)	2:29.0	

=== Finals ===
Björn Lind finished 0.6 seconds ahead of Roddy Darragon to win the Olympic gold medal in the cross-country sprint.

Final A

Rank	Seed	Athlete	Result
Gold medal	1	Björn Lind (SWE)	2:26.5
Silver medal	10	Roddy Darragon (FRA)	2:27.1
Bronze medal	19	Thobias Fredriksson (SWE)	2:27.8
4	5	Cristian Zorzi (ITA)	2:31.7

Final B

Rank	Seed	Athlete	Result
5	17	Freddy Schwienbacher (ITA)	2:23.9
6	8	Loris Frasnelli (ITA)	2:25.2
7	3	Johan Kjølstad (NOR)	2:25.6
8	14	Anti Saarepuu (EST)	2:27.9
