= Cross-country skiing at the 2006 Winter Olympics – Men's team sprint =

Men's team sprint at the XX Olympic Winter Games
- Venue: Pragelato
- Dates: 14 February 2006
- Competitors: 50 from 25 nations
- Winning time: 17:02.9

Medalists
1st place, gold medalist(s)		Sweden Thobias Fredriksson & Björn Lind
2nd place, silver medalist(s)		Norway Jens Arne Svartedal & Tor Arne Hetland
3rd place, bronze medalist(s)		Russia Ivan Alypov & Vasily Rochev

The Men's team sprint cross-country skiing competition at the 2006 Winter Olympics in Turin, Italy, was held on 14 February 2006 at Pragelato. This was the first time the team sprint was contested in the Winter Olympics. Each race featured teams of two, with each skier completing 3 laps of a 1325-metre course.

Norway, with Tore Ruud Hofstad and Tor Arne Hetland, had won the competition at the 2005 Nordic skiing World Championship, the only time it had been skied in the World Championship prior to the Turin games, but that was in free technique. The most recent team sprint event in classic technique had been in Canmore, Canada, on 18 December 2004. Jens Arne Svartedal and Eldar Rønning won that race for Norway's first team. However, despite this good Norwegian record, it was the Sweden's Thobias Fredriksson and Björn Lind who pipped Norway to the title.

== Results ==
=== Semifinals ===
Fifteen teams were entered in the two semifinals, with the top five in each advancing to the final.

Semifinal 1

Rank	Country	Athletes	Time	Notes
1	Sweden	Thobias Fredriksson; Björn Lind	17:34.0	Q
2	Czech Republic	Dušan Kožíšek; Martin Koukal	17:34.9	Q
3	Slovakia	Martin Bajčičák; Ivan Bátory	17:36.1	Q
4	Finland	Keijo Kurttila; Lauri Pyykönen	17:39.2	Q
5	Kazakhstan	Nikolay Chebotko; Yevgeniy Koschevoy	17:42.6	Q
6	Japan	Katsuhito Ebisawa; Yuichi Onda	17:46.6	
7	Estonia	Priit Barusk; Anti Saarepuu	18:07.4	
8	Slovenia	Nejc Brodar; Joze Mehle	18:34.4	
9	Ukraine	Ivan Bilosyuk; Vitaly Martsyv	18:50.4	
10	China	Tian Ye; Li Geiliang	18:57.4	
11	Romania	Zsolt Antal; Mihai Galiceanu	18:04.3	
12	Turkey	Sebahattin Oğlago; Muhammet Kızılarslan	19:46.5	
	Belarus	Sergei Dolidovich; Alexander Lasutkin	DNS	

Semifinal 2

Rank	Country	Athletes	Time	Notes
1	Norway	Jens Arne Svartedal; Tor Arne Hetland	17:22.1	Q
2	Russia	Ivan Alypov; Vasily Rochev	17:22.2	Q
3	Germany	Jens Filbrich; Andreas Schlütter	17:22.6	Q
4	Italy	Freddy Schwienbacher; Giorgio Di Centa	17:26.2	Q
5	Poland	Maciej Kreczmer; Janusz Krężelok	17:27.1	Q
6	Canada	Devon Kershaw; George Grey	17:31.2	
7	United States	Chris Cook; Andrew Newell	17:54.9	
8	Switzerland	Reto Burgermeister; Christoph Eigenmann	18:00.5	
9	Austria	Johannes Eder; Juergen Pinter	18:12.2	
10	South Korea	Choi Im-Heon; Park Byung Joo	19:40.0	
11	Croatia	Damir Jurčević; Denis Klobučar	19.43.1	
	Armenia	Hovhannes Sargsyan; Edmond Khachatryan	DNF	

=== Final ===
The top three teams separated themselves from the pack fairly easily, with Sweden finishing just 0.6 seconds ahead of Norway to take the gold medal.

Rank	Country	Athletes	Time
Gold medal	Sweden	Thobias Fredriksson; Björn Lind	17:02.9
Silver medal	Norway	Jens Arne Svartedal; Tor Arne Hetland	17:03.5
Bronze medal	Russia	Ivan Alypov; Vasily Rochev	17:05.2
4	Germany	Jens Filbrich; Andreas Schlütter	17:14.0
5	Finland	Keijo Kurttila; Lauri Pyykönen	17:21.5
6	Kazakhstan	Nikolay Chebotko; Yevgeniy Koschevoy	17:25.1
7	Poland	Maciej Kreczmer; Janusz Krężelok	17:26.3
8	Slovakia	Martin Bajčičák; Ivan Bátory	18:30.9
9	Italy	Freddy Schwienbacher; Giorgio Di Centa	18:31.3
10	Czech Republic	Dušan Kožíšek; Martin Koukal	18:49.6
