= Johannes Eder =

Austrian cross-country skier

Personal information
- Nationality: Austria
- Born: 19 October 1979 (age 46) Oberndorf bei Salzburg, Austria

Sport
- Sport: Skiing
- Club: SK Maishofen

World Cup career
- Seasons: 1998–1999, 2001–2006
- Indiv. starts: 37
- Indiv. podiums: 0
- Team starts: 6
- Team podiums: 0
- Overall titles: 0 – (93rd in 1999)
- Discipline titles: 0

Johannes Eder (born 19 October 1979) is an Austrian cross-country skier who competed between 1998 and 2007.

Eder has five individual career victories up to 30 km (four in Continental Cup, one in an FIS race) from 2001 to 2004. In 2006, he was disqualified for doping violations in the last two races he entered for the 2005-06 racing season, but was reinstated in time to compete in the 2007 FIS Nordic World Ski Championships in Sapporo.

On 22 November 2007, the FIS announced that Eder along with two other cross country skiers from Austria (Roland Diethard and Martin Tauber), received two-year bans for doping incurred. All results from the incursion that was caught on 18 February 2006 during the 2006 Winter Olympics in Turin for Eder and the two other skiers to the date of the suspension issued were disqualified and any awards earned were forfeited. Seven months earlier, Eder received a lifetime ban from the IOC for his doping actions in Turin.

== Cross-country skiing results ==
=== Olympic Games ===
Year	Age	15 km individual	30 km skiathlon	50 km mass start	Sprint	4 × 10 km relay	Team sprint
2006	26	—	—	—	—	DSQ	DSQ

=== World Championships ===
Year	Age	15 km individual	30 km skiathlon	50 km mass start	Sprint	4 × 10 km relay	Team sprint
2005	25	30	DNF	—	—	—	11
2007	27	DSQ	DSQ	DSQ	—	—	—

=== World Cup ===
Season Standings
Season	Age	Discipline standings			
Season	Age	Overall	Distance	Long Distance	Sprint
1998	19	NC	—N/a	NC	DNP
1999	20	93	—N/a	NC	93
2001	22	NC	—N/a	—N/a	DNP
2002	23	NC	—N/a	—N/a	NC
2003	24	NC	—N/a	—N/a	NC
2004	25	NC	NC	—N/a	DNP
2005	26	144	91	—N/a	DNP
2006	27	175	127	—N/a	DNP
