= Loris Frasnelli =

Italian cross-country skier (born 1979)

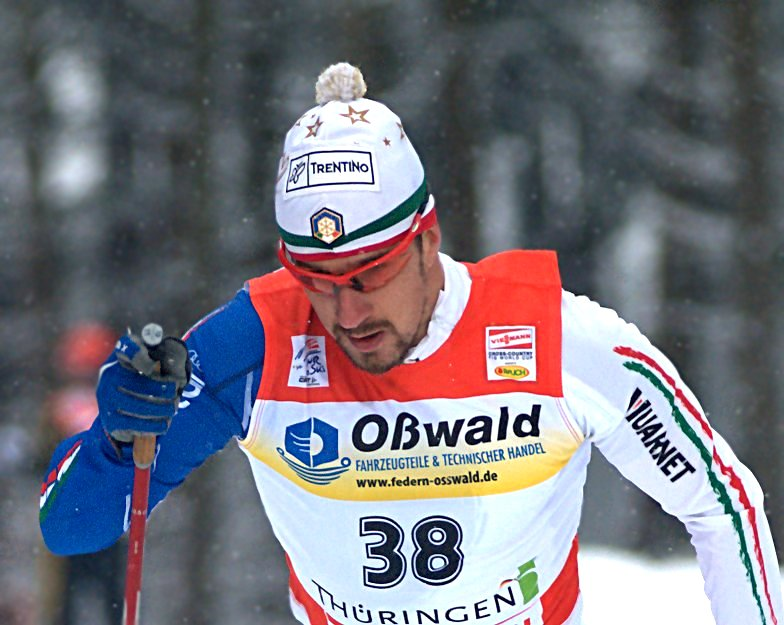
- Frasnelli in 2010

Personal information
- Nationality: Italy
- Born: 22 February 1979 (age 47) Trento, Italy

Sport
- Sport: Skiing
- Club: Robinson Ski Team

World Cup career
- Seasons: 13 – (2001–2012, 2014)
- Indiv. starts: 86
- Indiv. podiums: 0
- Team starts: 13
- Team podiums: 2
- Team wins: 1
- Overall titles: 0 – (46th in 2006)
- Discipline titles: 0
Medal record
Men's cross-country skiing
Representing Italy
U23 World Championships
Gold medal – first place	2002 Val di Fiemme	Individual sprint
Junior World Championships
Bronze medal – third place	1998 Pontresina	4 × 10 km relay

Loris Frasnelli (born 22 February 1979) is an Italian cross-country skier who has competed since 1998. His lone World Cup victory was in a team sprint event in Japan in 2006.

Competing in two Winter Olympics, he earned his best finish of sixth in the individual sprint event at Turin in 2006.

His best finish at the FIS Nordic World Ski Championships was 23rd in the individual sprint event at Sapporo in 2007.

== Cross-country skiing results ==
=== Olympic Games ===
Year	Age	15 km individual	30 km skiathlon	50 km mass start	Sprint	4 × 10 km relay	Team sprint
2006	27	—	—	—	8	—	—
2010	31	—	—	—	30	—	—

=== World Championships ===
Year	Age	15 km individual	30 km skiathlon	50 km mass start	Sprint	4 × 10 km relay	Team sprint
2005	26	—	—	—	26	—	—
2007	28	—	—	—	23	—	—
2011	32	—	—	—	—	—	9

=== World Cup ===
Season standings
Season	Age	Discipline standings			Ski Tour standings		
Season	Age	Overall	Distance	Sprint	Nordic Opening	Tour de Ski	World Cup Final
2001	22	77	—N/a	39	—N/a	—N/a	—N/a
2002	23	107	—N/a	53	—N/a	—N/a	—N/a
2003	24	142	—N/a	78	—N/a	—N/a	—N/a
2004	25	88	NC	42	—N/a	—N/a	—N/a
2005	26	85	—	40	—N/a	—N/a	—N/a
2006	27	46	NC	18	—N/a	—N/a	—N/a
2007	28	109	NC	52	—N/a	61	—N/a
2008	29	NC	—	NC	—N/a	—	—
2009	30	137	107	86	—N/a	—	—
2010	31	60	69	31	—N/a	DNF	—
2011	32	48	45	31	—	DNF	40
2012	33	97	—	48	—	—	—
2014	35	NC	—	NC	—	—	—

==== Team podiums ====
- 1 victory – (1 TS)
- 2 podiums – (2 TS)

No.	Season	Date	Location	Race	Level	Place	Teammate
1	2005–06	16 March 2008	Sapporo, Japan	6 × 1.5 km Team Sprint F	World Cup	1st	Zorzi
2	2009–10	24 January 2010	Rybinsk, Russia	6 × 1.3 km Team Sprint F	World Cup	2nd	Pasini
