= Renato Pasini =

Italian cross-country skier

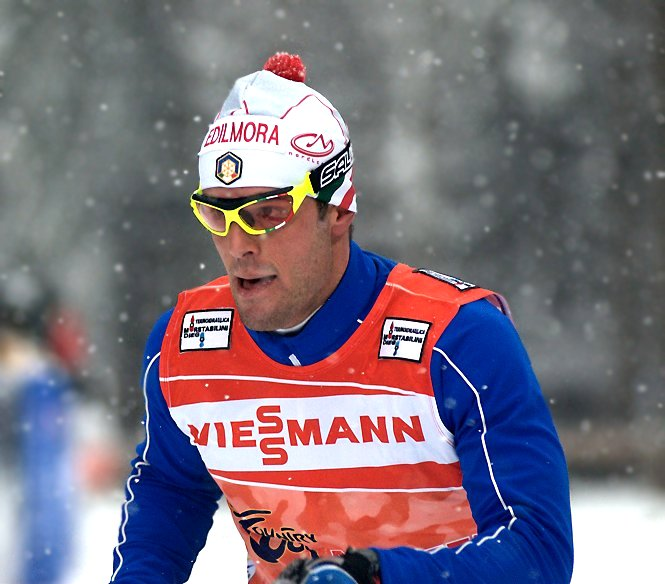
- Renato Pasini in 2010

Personal information
- Nationality: Italy
- Born: 31 July 1977 (age 49) Gazzaniga, Italy

Sport
- Sport: Skiing
- Club: G.S. Forestale

World Cup career
- Seasons: 14 – (2000–2013)
- Indiv. starts: 111
- Indiv. podiums: 3
- Indiv. wins: 2
- Team starts: 28
- Team podiums: 4
- Team wins: 0
- Overall titles: 0 – (20th in 2009)
- Discipline titles: 0
Medal record
Men's cross-country skiing
Representing Italy
World Championships
Gold medal – first place	2007 Sapporo	Team sprint

Renato Pasini (born 31 July 1977) is an Italian former cross-country skier who began competing in 1996. He won the gold medal in the team sprint (with Cristian Zorzi) at the 2007 FIS Nordic World Ski Championships in Sapporo. Pasini also has seven individual victories at various levels all in sprint since 2002.

Competing in two Winter Olympics, his best finish at the Winter Olympics was 18th in the individual sprint at Turin in 2006.

He has also finished second in the 2008–2009 Sprint World Cup.

Pasini competes also in ski mountaineering events, amongst others in the Trofeo Mezzalama race, in which he finished sixth in 2001, together with Luciano Fontana and Ivano Molin, and 10th together with his brother Fabio Pasini and Daniele Chioda in 2009.

== Cross-country skiing results ==
All results are sourced from the International Ski Federation (FIS).

=== Olympic Games ===
Year	Age	15 km individual	30 km skiathlon	50 km mass start	Sprint	4 × 10 km relay	Team sprint
2006	28	—	—	—	18	—	—
2010	32	—	—	—	20	—	8

=== World Championships ===
- 1 medal – (1 gold)

Year	Age	15 km	Pursuit	30 km	50 km	Sprint	4 × 10 km relay	Team sprint
2003	25	—	—	—	—	22	—	—N/a
2005	27	—	—	—N/a	—	30	—	—
2007	29	—	—	—N/a	—	DSQ	—	Gold
2009	31	—	—	—N/a	—	14	—	13
2011	33	—	—	—N/a	—	30	—	9

=== World Cup ===
==== Season standings ====
Season	Age	Discipline standings					Ski Tour standings		
Season	Age	Overall	Distance	Long Distance	Middle Distance	Sprint	Nordic Opening	Tour de Ski	World Cup Final
2000	22	NC	—N/a	–	NC	–	—N/a	—N/a	—N/a
2001	23	63	—N/a	—N/a	—N/a	29	—N/a	—N/a	—N/a
2002	24	84	—N/a	—N/a	—N/a	39	—N/a	—N/a	—N/a
2003	25	69	—N/a	—N/a	—N/a	32	—N/a	—N/a	—N/a
2004	26	38	NC	—N/a	—N/a	13	—N/a	—N/a	—N/a
2005	27	41	NC	—N/a	—N/a	20	—N/a	—N/a	—N/a
2006	28	79	–	—N/a	—N/a	31	—N/a	—N/a	—N/a
2007	29	38	NC	—N/a	—N/a	14	—N/a	–	—N/a
2008	30	115	NC	—N/a	—N/a	78	—N/a	53	–
2009	31	20	NC	—N/a	—N/a	2nd place, silver medalist(s)	—N/a	–	75
2010	32	53	NC	—N/a	—N/a	19	—N/a	DNF	–
2011	33	40	NC	—N/a	—N/a	9	DNF	DNF	44
2012	34	115	NC	—N/a	—N/a	63	DNF	–	–
2013	35	NC	–	—N/a	—N/a	NC	–	–	–

==== Individual podiums ====
- 2 victories – (2 WC)
- 3 podiums – (3 WC)

No.	Season	Date	Location	Race	Level	Place
1	2006–07	21 January 2007	Rybinsk, Russia	1.2 km Sprint F	World Cup	1st
2	2008–09	14 December 2008	Davos, Switzerland	1.7 km Sprint F	World Cup	3rd
3	2008–09	31 January 2009	Rybinsk, Russia	1.3 km Sprint F	World Cup	1st

==== Team podiums ====
- 4 podiums – (4 TS)

No.	Season	Date	Location	Race	Level	Place	Teammate
1	2002–03	14 February 2003	Asiago, Italy	10 × 1.4 km Team Sprint	World Cup	3rd	Schwienbacher
2	2004–05	5 December 2004	Bern, Switzerland	6 × 1.1 km Team Sprint	World Cup	3rd	Zorzi
3	2006–07	29 October 2006	Düsseldorf, Germany	6 × 1.5 km Team Sprint F	World Cup	3rd	Zorzi
4	2008–09	18 January 2009	Whistler, Canada	6 × 1.6 km Team Sprint	World Cup	2nd	F. Pasini
