= FIS Nordic World Ski Championships 2007 – Men's team sprint =

Men's team sprint at the FIS Nordic World Ski Championships 2007
- Venue: Sapporo Dome
- Date: 23 February 2007
- Competitors: 42 from 21 nations
- Teams: 21
- Winning time: 17:50.6

Medalists
gold medal	Renato Pasini; Cristian Zorzi	Italy
silver medal	Nikolay Morilov; Vasily Rochev	Russia
bronze medal	Milan Šperl; Dušan Kožíšek	Czech Republic

The men's team sprint took place on 23 February 2007. Team sprint qualifying at 16:20 CET and finals at 17:20 CET. The defending world champions were Norway's Tore Ruud Hofstad and Tor Arne Hetland.

== Results ==
Q – Qualified for final round due to placing in heat
q – Qualified for final round due to times
PF – Placing decided by Photo finish

=== Semifinals ===
Semifinal 1

Rank	Bib	Country	Athletes	Time	Deficit	Note
	2	Norway	Tor Arne Hetland; Petter Northug			Q
	3	Russia	Nikolay Morilov; Vasily Rochev			Q
	4	Canada	Devon Kershaw; Drew Goldsack			Q
	5	Poland	Maciej Kreczmer; Janusz Krężelok			Q
	6	Czech Republic	Milan Šperl; Dušan Kožíšek			Q
6	7	Finland	Ville Nousiainen; Sami Jauhojärvi	18:28.1	+5.7	
7	8	Switzerland	Christoph Eigenmann; Remo Fischer	19:09.4	+47.0	
8	11	Australia	Ben Sim; Paul Murray	19:58.4	+1:36.0	
9	10	Hungary	Imre Tagscherer; Zoltán Tagscherer	20:06.1	+1:43.7	
10	9	Greece	Lefteris Fafalis; Grigoris Moschovakos	20:28.2	+2:05.8	
—	1	Sweden	Björn Lind; Peter Larsson	DNF		

Semifinal 2

Rank	Bib	Country	Athletes	Time	Deficit	Note
	13	Italy	Renato Pasini; Cristian Zorzi			Q
	14	Estonia	Peeter Kummel; Priit Narusk			Q
	16	Germany	Tobias Angerer; Axel Teichmann			Q
	17	Kazakhstan	Nikolay Chebotko; Yevgeniy Koschevoy			Q
	18	Austria	Martin Stockinger; Jürgen Pinter			Q
6	19	Japan	Osamu Yamagishi; Yuichi Onda	18:37.5	+14.6	
7	15	France	Roddy Darragon; Cyril Miranda	18:43.7	+20.8	
8	12	United States	Torin Koos; Andrew Newell	18:54.0	+31.1	
9	20	Slovakia	Martin Otčenáš; Michal Malák	19:03.9	+41.0	
10	21	China	Songtao Wang; Geliang Li	19:23.5	+1:00.6	

=== Final ===
Rank	Bib	Country	Athlete	Time	Deficit	Note
1st place, gold medalist(s)	13	Italy	Renato Pasini; Cristian Zorzi	17:50.6	—	PF
2nd place, silver medalist(s)	3	Russia	Nikolay Morilov; Vasily Rochev	17:50.6	+0.0	PF
3rd place, bronze medalist(s)	6	Czech Republic	Milan Šperl; Dušan Kožíšek	17:51.3	+0.7	
4	16	Germany	Tobias Angerer; Axel Teichmann	17:51.4	+0.8	PF
5	5	Poland	Maciej Kreczmer; Janusz Krężelok	17:51.5	+0.9	PF
6	4	Canada	Devon Kershaw; Drew Goldsack	17:54.9	+4.3	
7	2	Norway	Tor Arne Hetland; Petter Northug	17:58.7	+8.1	
8	14	Estonia	Peeter Kummel; Priit Narusk	18:45.7	+55.1	
—	17	Kazakhstan	Nikolay Chebotko; Yevgeniy Koschevoy	DSQ		
—	18	Austria	Martin Stockinger; Jürgen Pinter	DSQ		
