= Ivan Alypov =

Russian cross-country skier

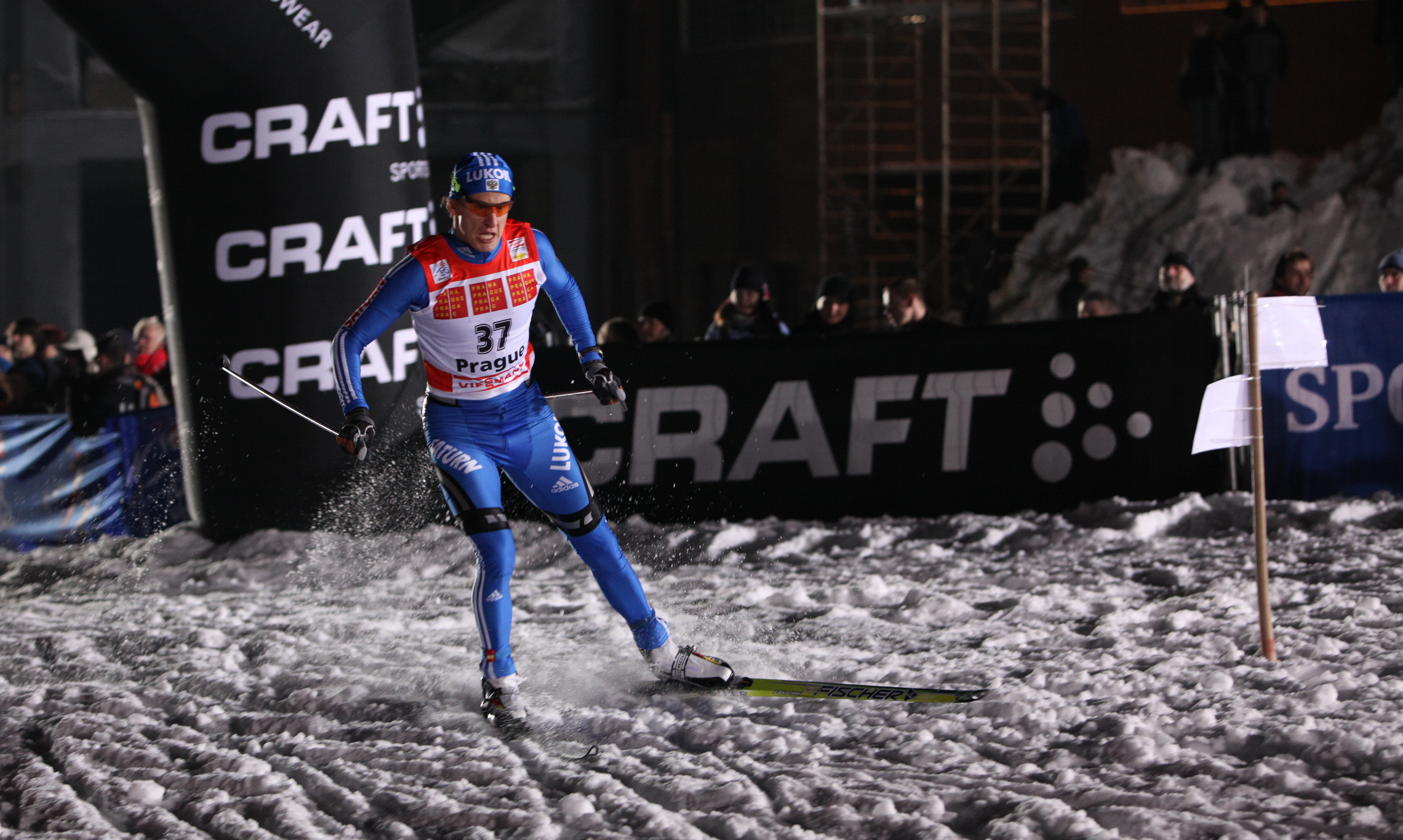
- Ivan Alypov in 2010

Personal information
- Full name: Ivan Vladimirovich Alypov
- Nationality: Russia
- Born: 19 April 1982 (age 44) Sverdlovsk, Soviet Union

Sport
- Sport: Skiing

World Cup career
- Seasons: 9 – (2003–2011)
- Indiv. starts: 80
- Indiv. podiums: 2
- Indiv. wins: 0
- Team starts: 17
- Team podiums: 3
- Team wins: 1
- Overall titles: 0 – (35th in 2006)
- Discipline titles: 0
Medal record
Men's cross-country skiing
Representing Russia
Olympic Games
Bronze medal – third place	2006 Turin	Team sprint

Ivan Vladimirovich Alypov (Russian: Иван Владимирович Алыпов; born 19 April 1982) is a Russian cross-country skier who has competed since 2002. He won the bronze medal in the Team Sprint event at the 2006 Winter Olympics at Turin.

Alypov's best finish at the Nordic skiing World Championships was 34th in the Sprint event in 2005. He won a 30 km event in Italy in 2003 and was a Russian national champion in a 50 km event in 2006.

== Cross-country skiing results ==
All results are sourced from the International Ski Federation (FIS).

=== Olympic Games ===
- 1 medal – (1 bronze)

Year	Age	15 km individual	30 km skiathlon	50 km mass start	Sprint	4 × 10 km relay	Team sprint
2006	23	—	—	—	28	6	3rd

=== World Championships ===
Year	Age	15 km individual	30 km skiathlon	50 km mass start	Sprint	4 × 10 km relay	Team sprint
2005	22	—	—	DNF	34	—	8
2007	24	—	—	39	—	—	—

=== World Cup ===
Season	Age	Discipline standings			Ski Tour standings		
Season	Age	Overall	Distance	Sprint	Nordic Opening	Tour de Ski	World Cup Final
2003	20	NC	—N/a	—	—N/a	—N/a	—N/a
2004	21	41	36	28	—N/a	—N/a	—N/a
2005	22	72	69	32	—N/a	—N/a	—N/a
2006	23	35	38	27	—N/a	—N/a	—N/a
2007	24	80	91	40	—N/a	29	—N/a
2008	25	98	68	88	—N/a	—	57
2009	26	99	100	61	—N/a	—	—
2010	27	87	108	44	—N/a	DNF	—
2011	28	NC	NC	—	—	—	—

==== Individual podiums ====
- 2 podiums – (1 WC, 1 SWC)

No.	Season	Date	Location	Race	Level	Place
1	2003–04	10 January 2004	Otepää, Estonia	30 km Mass Start C	World Cup	3rd
2	2006–07	6 January 2007	Val di Fiemme, Italy	30 km Mass Start C	Stage World Cup	2nd

==== Team podiums ====
- 1 victory – (1 TS)
- 3 podiums – (1 RL, 2 TS)

No.	Season	Date	Location	Race	Level	Place	Teammate(s)
1	2003–04	11 January 2004	Otepää, Estonia	4 × 10 km Relay C/F	World Cup	3rd	Pankratov / Ivanov / Vilisov
2	2003–04	15 February 2004	Oberstdorf, Germany	6 × 1.2 km Team Sprint F	World Cup	3rd	Rochev
3	2004–05	5 December 2004	Bern, Switzerland	6 × 1.1 km Team Sprint F	World Cup	1st	Rochev
