= Lauri Pyykönen =

Finnish cross-country skier

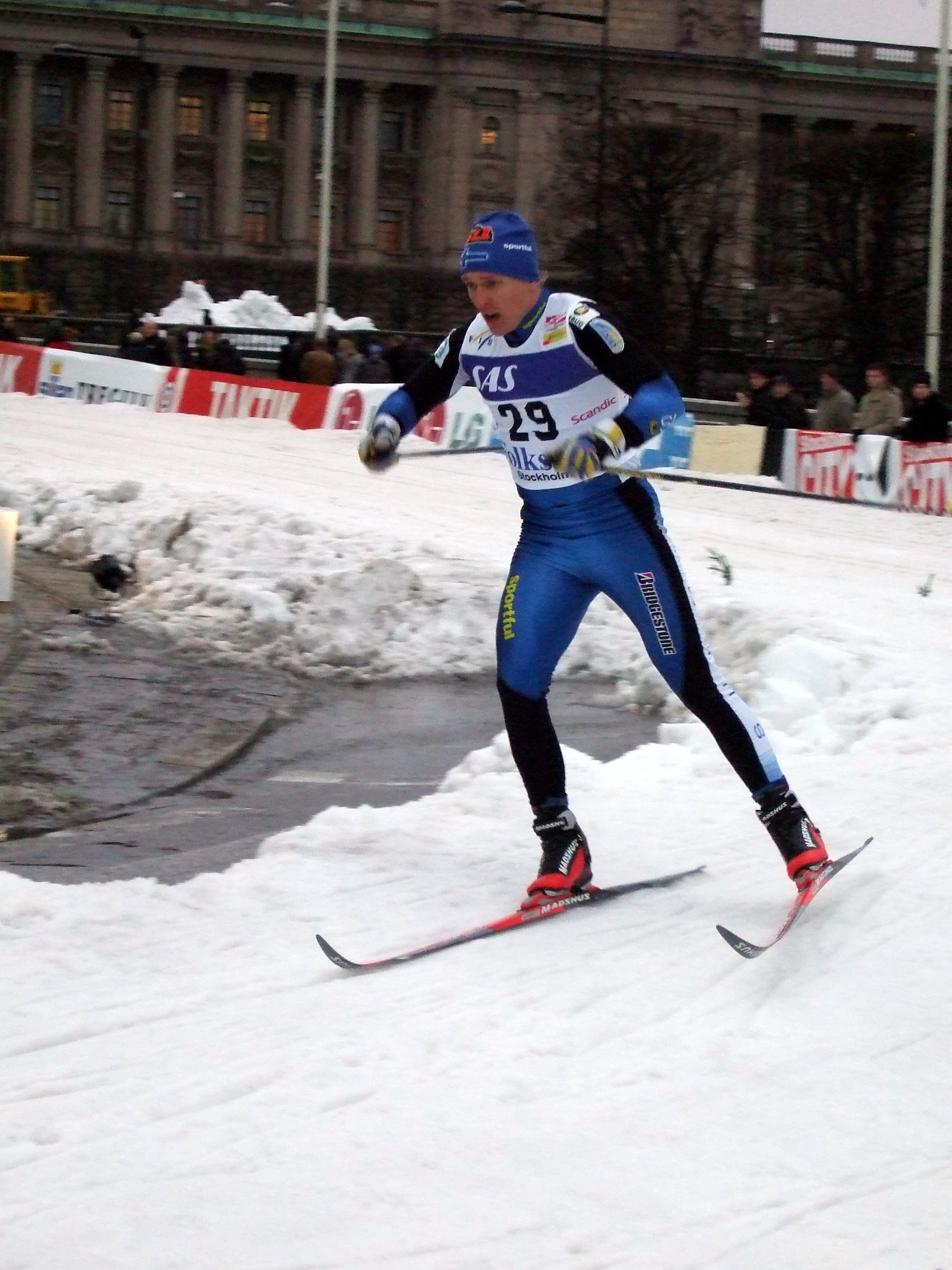

Personal information
- Nationality: Finland
- Born: 20 April 1978 (age 48) Pirkkala, Finland

Sport
- Sport: Skiing
- Club: Vantaan Hiihtoseura

World Cup career
- Seasons: 9 – (1999, 2001–2008)
- Indiv. starts: 67
- Indiv. podiums: 2
- Indiv. wins: 0
- Team starts: 15
- Team podiums: 0
- Overall titles: 0 – (26th in 2003)
- Discipline titles: 0

Lauri Pyykönen (born 20 April 1978 in Pirkkala) is a Finnish cross-country skier who competed from 1998 to 2008. His best World Cup finish was second twice, both in sprint events, with one each in 2002 and in 2003.

At the 2006 Winter Olympics in Turin, Pyykönen finished fifth in the team sprint, 27th in the individual sprint, and 54th in the 15 km events. His best finish at the FIS Nordic World Ski Championships was 12th in the sprint event at Val di Fiemme in 2003.

== Cross-country skiing results ==
All results are sourced from the International Ski Federation (FIS).

=== Olympic Games ===
Year	Age	15 km individual	30 km skiathlon	50 km mass start	Sprint	4 × 10 km relay	Team sprint
2006	27	54	—	—	27	—	5

=== World Championships ===
Year	Age	15 km	Pursuit	30 km	50 km	Sprint	4 × 10 km relay	Team sprint
2003	24	22	—	—	—	12	—	—N/a
2005	26	—	—	—N/a	—	13	—	15
2007	28	—	DNF	—N/a	—	13	—	—

=== World Cup ===
==== Season standings ====
Season	Age	Discipline standings				Ski Tour standings	
Season	Age	Overall	Distance	Long Distance	Sprint	Tour de Ski	World Cup Final
1999	20	NC	—N/a	NC	—	—N/a	—N/a
2001	22	55	—N/a	—N/a	10	—N/a	—N/a
2002	23	67	—N/a	—N/a	28	—N/a	—N/a
2003	24	26	—N/a	—N/a	3rd place, bronze medalist(s)	—N/a	—N/a
2004	25	61	NC	—N/a	27	—N/a	—N/a
2005	26	50	NC	—N/a	25	—N/a	—N/a
2006	27	135	NC	—N/a	59	—N/a	—N/a
2007	28	91	NC	—N/a	44	—	—N/a
2008	29	NC	—	—N/a	NC	—	—

==== Individual podiums ====
- 2 podiums – (2 WC)

No.	Season	Date	Location	Race	Level	Place
1	2002–03	15 December 2002	Cogne, Italy	1.5 km Sprint C	World Cup	2nd
2	2002–03	6 March 2003	Oslo, Norway	1.5 km Sprint C	World Cup	2nd
