= Trond Iversen =

Norwegian cross-country skier

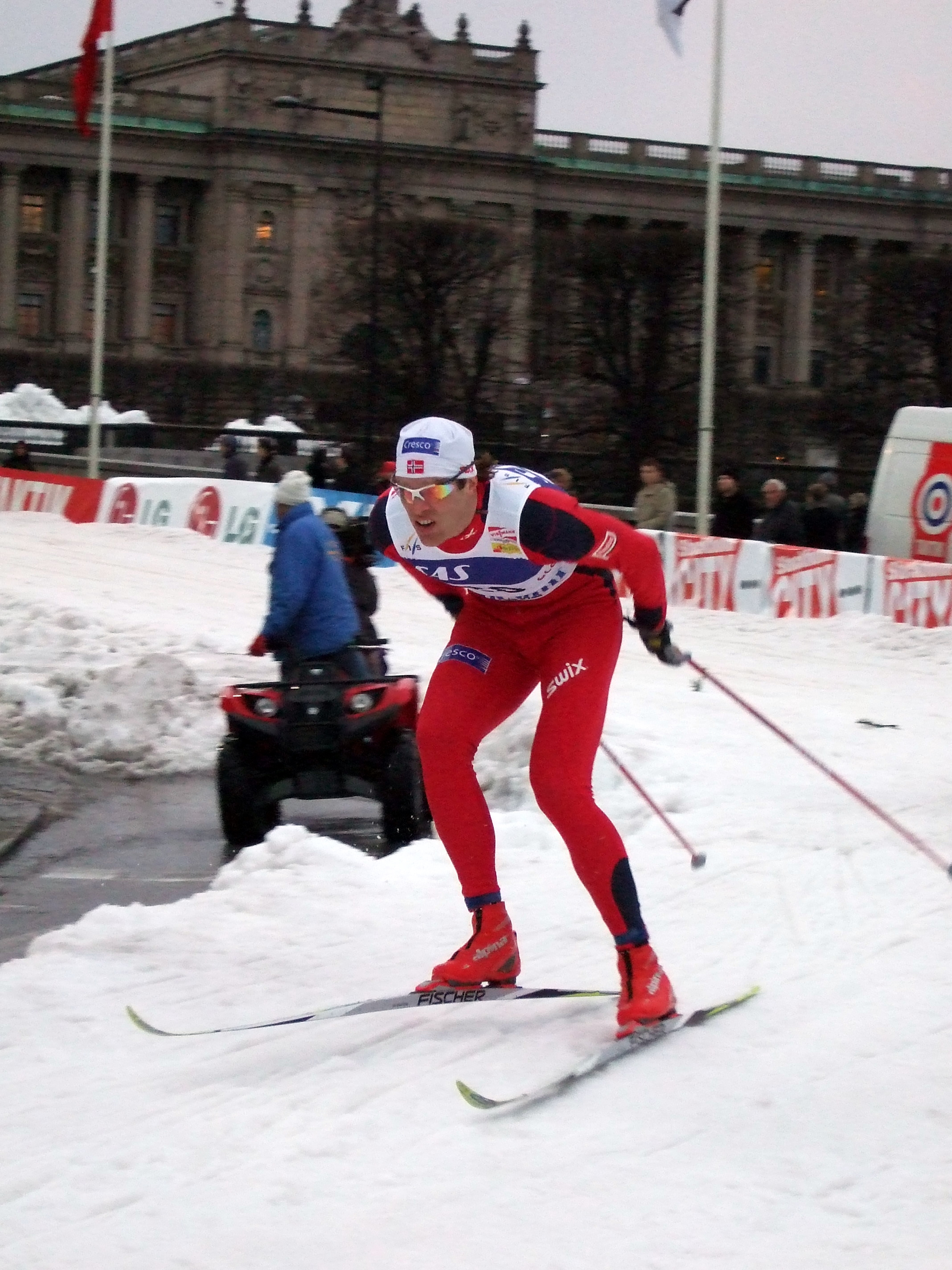
- Trond Iversen in Stockholm, 2007

Personal information
- Nationality: Norway
- Born: 26 March 1976 (age 50) Drammen, Norway

Sport
- Sport: Skiing
- Club: Mjøndalen IF

World Cup career
- Seasons: 10 – (2000–2009)
- Indiv. starts: 55
- Indiv. podiums: 7
- Indiv. wins: 2
- Team starts: 5
- Team podiums: 2
- Team wins: 1
- Overall titles: 0 – (12th in 2002)
- Discipline titles: 1 – (1 SP: 2002)

Trond Iversen (born 22 March 1976) is a Norwegian cross-country skier who competed between 1996 and 2010.

Iversen has a total of ten victories since 2001. His best finish at the Winter Olympics was sixth in the individual sprint at the 2002 Games in Salt Lake City. His best finish at the FIS Nordic World Ski Championships was ninth in the individual sprint event at the 2005 championships in Oberstdorf, Germany.

Despite being ranked third in the 2006–07 World Cup Sprint category standings as of 16 February 2007, Iversen was not selected to represent the Norwegian team at the FIS Nordic World Ski Championships 2007 in Sapporo, Japan.

Iversen is married and has two children.

== Cross-country skiing results ==
All results are sourced from the International Ski Federation (FIS).

=== Olympic Games ===
Year	Age	15 km	Pursuit	30 km	50 km	Sprint	4 × 10 km relay	Team sprint
2002	25	10	16	—	—	6	—	—N/a
2006	29	—	—	—N/a	—	17	—	—

=== World Championships ===
Year	Age	15 km individual	30 km skiathlon	50 km mass start	Sprint	4 × 10 km relay	Team sprint
2005	28	—	—	—	9	—	—

=== World Cup ===
==== Season titles ====
- 1 title – (1 sprint)

Season
Season	Discipline
2002	Sprint

==== Season standings ====
Season	Age	Discipline standings					Ski Tour standings	
Season	Age	Overall	Distance	Long Distance	Middle Distance	Sprint	Tour de Ski	World Cup Final
2000	24	60	—N/a	—	—	25	—N/a	—N/a
2001	25	39	—N/a	—N/a	—N/a	16	—N/a	—N/a
2002	26	12	—N/a	—N/a	—N/a	1st place, gold medalist(s)	—N/a	—N/a
2003	27	49	—N/a	—N/a	—N/a	17	—N/a	—N/a
2004	28	40	—	—N/a	—N/a	15	—N/a	—N/a
2005	29	17	—	—N/a	—N/a	3rd place, bronze medalist(s)	—N/a	—N/a
2006	30	30	—	—N/a	—N/a	11	—N/a	—N/a
2007	31	22	—	—N/a	—N/a	2nd place, silver medalist(s)	—	—N/a
2008	32	86	—	—N/a	—N/a	16	—	—
2009	33	95	—	—N/a	—N/a	25	—	—

==== Individual podiums ====
- 2 victories – (2 WC)
- 7 podiums – (7 WC)

No.	Season	Date	Location	Race	Level	Place
1	1999–00	8 March 2000	Oslo, Norway	1.0 km Sprint C	World Cup	3rd
2	2000–01	1 February 2001	Asiago, Italy	1.5 km Sprint F	World Cup	2nd
3	2001–02	19 December 2001	Asiago, Italy	1.5 km Sprint C	World Cup	2nd
4	2001–02	6 January 2002	Val di Fiemme, Italy	1.5 km Sprint F	World Cup	1st
5	2001–02	5 March 2002	Stockholm, Sweden	1.5 km Sprint C	World Cup	2nd
6	2004–05	16 March 2005	Gothenburg, Sweden	1.1 km Sprint F	World Cup	1st
7	2006–07	14 March 2007	Drammen, Norway	1.2 km Sprint C	World Cup	3rd

==== Team podiums ====
- 1 victory – (1 TS)
- 2 podiums – (2 TS)

No.	Season	Date	Location	Race	Level	Place	Teammate
1	2004–05	15 December 2004	Asiago, Italy	6 × 1.2 km Team Sprint C	World Cup	3rd	Næss
2	2005–06	23 October 2005	Düsseldorf, Germany	6 × 1.5 km Team Sprint F	World Cup	1st	Kjølstad
