= FIS Nordic World Ski Championships 2007 – Men's 50 kilometre classical =

Men's 50 kilometre classical at the FIS Nordic World Ski Championships 2007
- Venue: Shirahatayama Open Stadium
- Date: 4 March 2007
- Competitors: 88 from 28 nations
- Winning time: 2:20:12.16

Medalists
gold medal	Odd-Bjørn Hjelmeset	Norway
silver medal	Frode Estil	Norway
bronze medal	Jens Filbrich	Germany

The men's 50 kilometre classical mass start event at the FIS Nordic World Ski Championships 2007 took place on 4 March 2007 at the Shirahatayama Open Stadium.

== Results ==
Rank	Bib	Athlete	Country	Time	Deficit
1st place, gold medalist(s)	6	Odd-Bjørn Hjelmeset	Norway	2:20:12.6	—
2nd place, silver medalist(s)	5	Frode Estil	Norway	2:20:13.0	+0.4
3rd place, bronze medalist(s)	7	Jens Filbrich	Germany	2:20:17.1	+4.5
4	1	Tobias Angerer	Germany	2:20:23.1	+10.5
5	13	Lukáš Bauer	Czech Republic	2:20:25.7	+13.1
6	20	Martin Bajcicak	Slovakia	2:20:53.6	+41.0
7	11	Jean Marc Gaillard	France	2:21:36.6	+1:24.0
8	10	Jaak Mae	Estonia	2:21:46.2	+1:33.6
9	18	Nikolay Pankratov	Russia	2:21:50.6	+1:38.0
10	31	Ville Nousiainen	Finland	2:22:27.5	+2:14.9
11	46	Kaspar Kokk	Estonia	2:22:40.8	+2:28.2
12	42	Kris Freeman	United States	2:22:51.5	+2:38.9
13	12	Sami Jauhojärvi	Finland	2:22:55.3	+2:42.7
14	3	Anders Södergren	Sweden	2:22:58.7	+2:46.1
15	8	René Sommerfeldt	Germany	2:23:00.0	+2:47.4
16	32	Anders Aukland	Norway	2:23:07.3	+2:54.7
17	16	Martin Larsson	Sweden	2:23:16.4	+3:03.8
18	17	Tom Reichelt	Germany	2:25:23.7	+5:11.1
19	23	Jens Arne Svartedal	Norway	2:25:41.9	+5:29.3
20	43	Shunsuke Komamura	Japan	2:25:47.5	+5:34.9
21	9	Martin Koukal	Czech Republic	2:26:04.0	+5:51.4
22	35	Tero Similä	Finland	2:26:13.6	+6:01.0
23	22	Maxim Odnodvortsev	Kazakhstan	2:26:41.7	+6:29.1
24	44	Katsuhito Ebiswawa	Japan	2:26:50.0	+6:37.4
25	38	Christophe Perrillat	France	2:27:39.0	+7:26.4
26	54	Katsuhiro Oyama	Japan	2:28:04.6	+7:52.0
27	2	Eldar Rønning	Norway	2:28:45.1	+8:32.5
28	51	Priit Narusk	Estonia	2:29:13.2	+9:00.6
29	49	Dan Roycroft	Canada	2:30:05.8	+9:53.2
30	57	Mikhail Gumenyak	Ukraine	2:30:18.6	+10:06.0
31	19	Giorgio Di Centa	Italy	2:30:27.6	+10:15.0
32	41	Aivar Rehemaa	Estonia	2:31:09.3	+10:56.7
33	63	Brian McKeever	Canada	2:32:10.4	+11:57.8
34	59	Olexandr Putsko	Ukraine	2:32:45.3	+12:32.7
35	56	Lars Flora	United States	2:32:47.6	+12:35.0
36	55	Aleksey Ivanov	Belarus	2:33:06.9	+12:54.3
37	14	Ivan Batory	Slovakia	2:33:41.7	+13:29.1
38	52	Stephan Kuhn	Canada	2:35:01.7	+14:49.1
39	30	Ivan Alypov	Russia	2:35:05.0	+14:52.4
40	33	Reto Burgermeister	Switzerland	2:35:30.5	+15:17.9
41	28	Sergey Novikov	Russia	2:35:54.3	+15:41.7
42	24	Alexandre Rousselet	France	2:36:27.4	+16:14.8
43	48	Masaaki Kozu	Japan	2:37:36.4	+17:23.8
44	61	Francesc Soulie	Andorra	2:37:59.6	+17:47.0
45	29	Ivan Babikov	Canada	2:38:29.0	+18:16.4
46	40	Diego Ruiz	Spain	2:38:48.8	+18:36.2
47	53	James Southam	United States	2:41:39.7	+21:27.1
48	65	Wenyou Bian	China	LAP	
49	67	Jonas Thor Olsen	Denmark	LAP	
50	68	Daniel Kuzmin	Israel	LAP	
51	70	Rory Morrish	Ireland	LAP	
52	71	Helio Freitas	Brazil	LAP	
—	4	Mathias Fredriksson	Sweden	DNF	
—	25	Mikhail Botvinov	Austria	DNF	
—	26	Valerio Checchi	Italy	DNF	
—	27	Fabio Santus	Italy	DNF	
—	34	Sergei Dolidovich	Belarus	DNF	
—	37	Roman Leybyuk	Ukraine	DNF	
—	39	Andrey Golovko	Kazakhstan	DNF	
—	45	Vicente Vilarrubla	Spain	DNF	
—	50	Geliang Li	China	DNF	
—	58	Xia Wan	China	DNF	
—	64	Sebahattin Oglago	Turkey	DNF	
—	69	Alan Eason	United Kingdom	DNF	
—	15	Pietro Piller Cottrer	Italy	DNS	
—	36	Alexander Lasutkin	Belarus	DNS	
—	60	Zsolt Antal	Romania	DNS	
—	66	Songtao Wang	China	DNS	
—	21	Martin Tauber	Austria	DSQ	
—	47	Jürgen Pinter	Austria	DSQ	
—	62	Andrey Kondroschev	Kazakhstan	DSQ	
—	72	Johannes Eder	Austria	DSQ	
