= Kurttila =

Kurttila is a Finnish surname. Notable people with the surname include:

- Keijo Kurttila (born 1975), Finnish cross-country skier
- Scott Kurttila (born c. 1965), American figure skater
