= Freddy Schwienbacher =

Italian cross-country skier

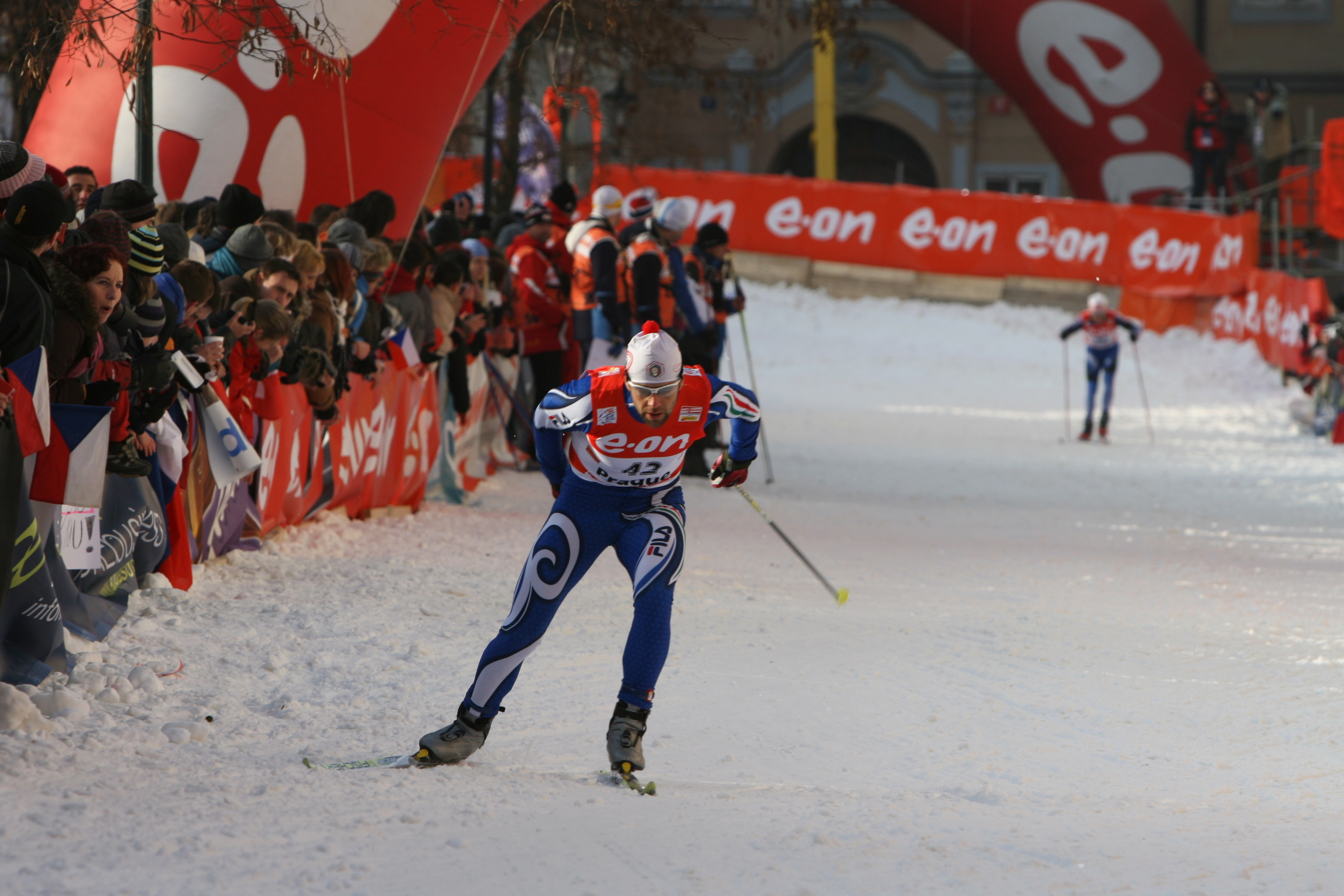
- Freddy Schwienbacher in 2007

Personal information
- Nationality: Italy
- Born: 3 August 1975 (age 51) Merano, Italy

Sport
- Sport: Skiing
- Club: Fiamme Gialle

World Cup career
- Seasons: 13 – (1996–1998, 2000–2009)
- Indiv. starts: 123
- Indiv. podiums: 2
- Indiv. wins: 1
- Team starts: 24
- Team podiums: 4
- Team wins: 1
- Overall titles: 0 – (27th in 2002, 2005)
- Discipline titles: 0
Medal record
Men's cross-country skiing
Representing Italy
Junior World Championships
Gold medal – first place	1995 Gällivare	4 × 10 km relay

Freddy Schwienbacher (born 3 August 1975) is an Italian cross-country skier. He competed at the 2002 Winter Olympics and the 2006 Winter Olympics.

== Cross-country skiing results ==
All results are sourced from the International Ski Federation (FIS).

=== Olympic Games ===
Year	Age	15 km	Pursuit	30 km	50 km	Sprint	4 × 10 km relay	Team sprint
2002	26	26	—	—	—	5	—	—N/a
2006	30	—	—	—N/a	—	5	—	9

=== World Championships ===
Year	Age	15 km	Pursuit	30 km	50 km	Sprint	4 × 10 km relay	Team sprint
2001	25	34	—	—	—	20	—	—N/a
2003	27	—	8	—	—	6	—	—N/a
2005	29	—	—	—N/a	—	33	—	4

=== World Cup ===
==== Season standings ====
Season	Age	Discipline standings					Ski Tour standings	
Season	Age	Overall	Distance	Long Distance	Middle Distance	Sprint	Tour de Ski	World Cup Final
1996	20	78	—N/a	—N/a	—N/a	—N/a	—N/a	—N/a
1997	21	NC	—N/a	NC	—N/a	—	—N/a	—N/a
1998	22	NC	—N/a	NC	—N/a	–	—N/a	—N/a
2000	24	30	—N/a	NC	29	12	—N/a	—N/a
2001	25	41	—N/a	—N/a	—N/a	18	—N/a	—N/a
2002	26	27	—N/a	—N/a	—N/a	10	—N/a	—N/a
2003	27	42	—N/a	—N/a	—N/a	22	—N/a	—N/a
2004	28	34	99	—N/a	—N/a	12	—N/a	—N/a
2005	29	27	40	—N/a	—N/a	18	—N/a	—N/a
2006	30	65	67	—N/a	—N/a	38	—N/a	—N/a
2007	31	NC	NC	—N/a	—N/a	NC	–	—N/a
2008	32	139	NC	—N/a	—N/a	94	39	–
2009	33	NC	–	—N/a	—N/a	NC	–	–

==== Individual podiums ====
- 1 victory – (1 WC)
- 2 podiums – (2 WC)

No.	Season	Date	Location	Race	Level	Place
1	2003–04	12 March 2004	Pragelato, Italy	1.3 km Sprint F	World Cup	1st
2	2004–05	16 January 2005	Nové Město, Czech Republic	1.2 km Sprint F	World Cup	2nd

==== Team podiums ====
- 1 victory – (1 TS)
- 4 podiums – (2 RL, 2 TS)

No.	Season	Date	Location	Race	Level	Place	Teammate(s)
1	2001–02	13 January 2002	Nové Město, Czech Republic	6 × 1.5 km Team Sprint F	World Cup	1st	Maj
2	2002–03	8 December 2002	Davos, Switzerland	4 × 10 km Relay C/F	World Cup	2nd	Di Centa / Piller Cottrer / Zorzi
3	2002–03	19 January 2003	Nové Město, Czech Republic	4 × 10 km Relay C/F	World Cup	2nd	Di Centa / Valbusa / Zorzi
4	2002–03	14 February 2003	Asiago, Italy	10 × 1.4 km Team Sprint	World Cup	3rd	Pasini
