= Roddy Darragon =

French cross-country skier

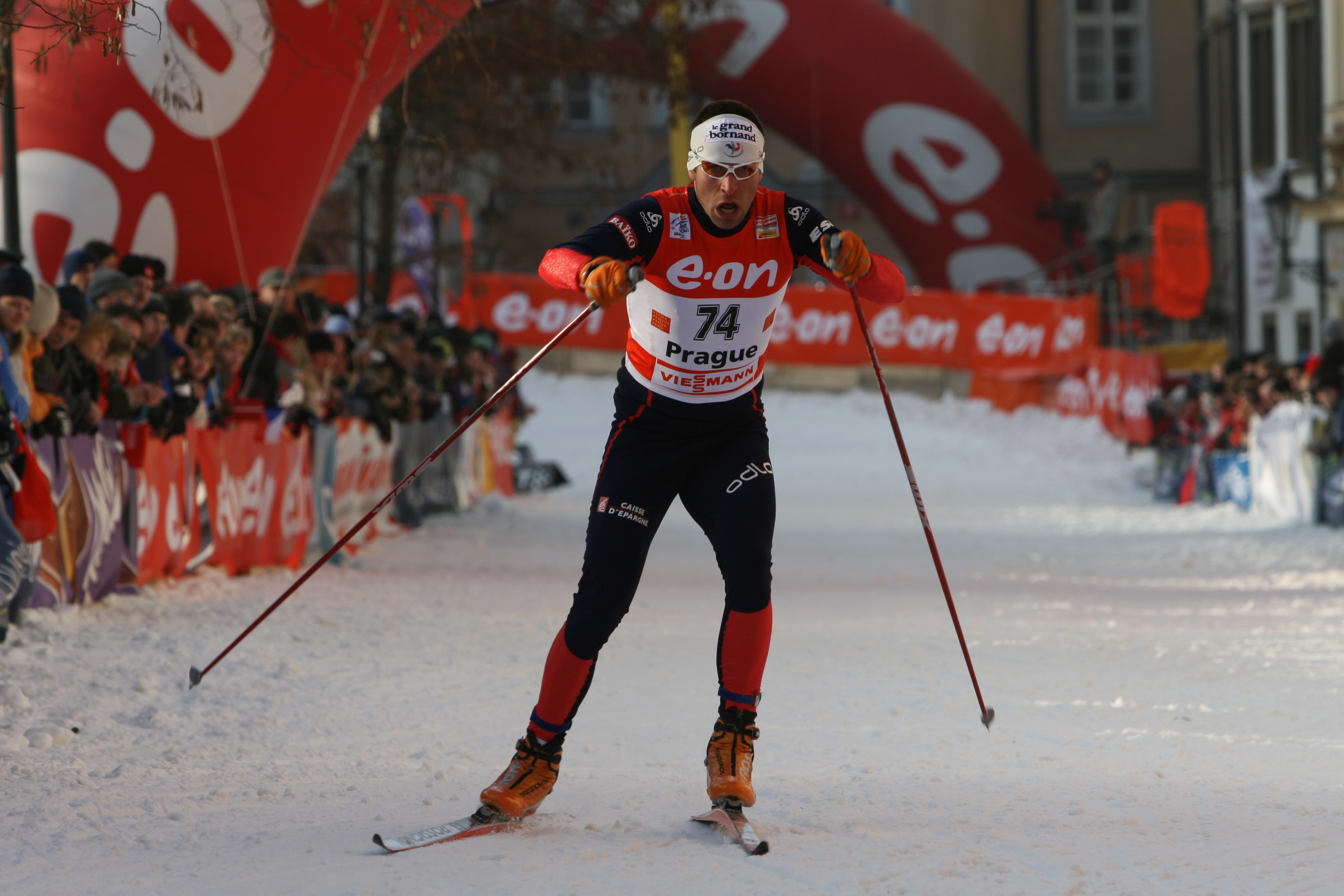
- Darragon at Tour de Ski, Prague 2007

Personal information
- Born: 31 July 1983 (age 42) Le Grand-Bornand, France

Sport
- Sport: Skiing
- Club: SC le Grand Bornand

World Cup career
- Seasons: 11 – (2004–2014)
- Indiv. starts: 83
- Indiv. podiums: 1
- Indiv. wins: 0
- Team starts: 17
- Team podiums: 0
- Overall titles: 0 – (45th in 2005)
- Discipline titles: 0
Medal record
Men's cross-country skiing
Representing France
Olympic Games
Silver medal – second place	2006 Turin	Individual sprint

Roddy Darragon (born August 31, 1983 in Le Grand-Bornand) is a French cross-country skier and non-commissioned officer who has competed since 2002. Competing in three Winter Olympics, he earned France's first ever Winter Olympic cross-country skiing medal with a silver in the individual sprint event at Turin in 2006.

Darragon's best finish at the FIS Nordic World Ski Championships was a 35th in the individual sprint event in 2005. His best World Cup finish was fourth in a sprint event in the Czech Republic in 2005.

== Cross-country skiing results ==
All results are sourced from the International Ski Federation (FIS).

=== Olympic Games ===
- 1 medal – (1 silver)

Year	Age	15 km individual	30 km skiathlon	50 km mass start	Sprint	4 × 10 km relay	Team sprint
2006	22	—	—	—	Silver	—	—
2010	26	—	—	—	31	—	—

=== World Championships ===
Year	Age	15 km individual	30 km skiathlon	50 km mass start	Sprint	4 × 10 km relay	Team sprint
2007	23	—	—	—	DSQ	—	11
2009	25	—	—	—	38	—	—

=== World Cup ===
==== Season standings ====
Season	Age	Discipline standings			Ski Tour standings		
Season	Age	Overall	Distance	Sprint	Nordic Opening	Tour de Ski	World Cup Final
2004	20	152	—	72	—N/a	—N/a	—N/a
2005	21	45	—	24	—N/a	—N/a	—N/a
2006	22	61	—	23	—N/a	—N/a	—N/a
2007	23	102	NC	49	—N/a	DNF	—N/a
2008	24	71	NC	39	—N/a	DNF	—
2009	25	48	NC	16	—N/a	50	76
2010	26	NC	—	NC	—N/a	—	—
2011	27	NC	NC	NC	DNF	—	—
2012	28	77	—	35	—	—	—
2013	29	87	NC	43	DNF	DNF	—
2014	30	NC	—	NC	—	—	—

==== Individual podiums ====
- 1 podium – (1 SWC)

No.	Season	Date	Location	Race	Level	Place
1	2006–07	31 December 2006	Munich, Germany	1.1 km Sprint F	Stage World Cup	3rd
