= Keijo Kurttila =

Finnish cross-country skier

Personal information
- Nationality: Finland
- Born: 8 April 1975 (age 51) Utajärvi, Finland

Sport
- Sport: Skiing
- Club: Imatran Urheilijat

World Cup career
- Seasons: 11 – (2000–2010)
- Indiv. starts: 62
- Indiv. podiums: 4
- Indiv. wins: 0
- Team starts: 13
- Team podiums: 0
- Overall titles: 0 – (29th in 2005)
- Discipline titles: 0

Keijo Kurttila (born 8 April 1975) is a Finnish cross-country skier. He competed at the 2002 Winter Olympics, and the 2006 Winter Olympics.

== Cross-country skiing results ==
All results are sourced from the International Ski Federation (FIS).

=== Olympic Games ===
Year	Age	15 km	Pursuit	30 km	50 km	Sprint	4 × 10 km relay	Team sprint
2002	26	—	—	—	—	25	—	—N/a
2006	30	—	—	—N/a	—	23	—	5

=== World Championships ===
Year	Age	15 km	Pursuit	30 km	50 km	Sprint	4 × 10 km relay	Team sprint
2003	27	—	—	—	—	15	—	—N/a
2005	29	—	—	—N/a	—	15	—	15

=== World Cup ===
==== Season standings ====
Season	Age	Discipline standings					Ski Tour standings	
Season	Age	Overall	Distance	Long Distance	Middle Distance	Sprint	Tour de Ski	World Cup Final
2000	24	109	—N/a	—	—	68	—N/a	—N/a
2001	25	94	—N/a	—N/a	—N/a	54	—N/a	—N/a
2002	26	31	—N/a	—N/a	—N/a	9	—N/a	—N/a
2003	27	37	—N/a	—N/a	—N/a	14	—N/a	—N/a
2004	28	86	86	—N/a	—N/a	55	—N/a	—N/a
2005	29	29	NC	—N/a	—N/a	10	—N/a	—N/a
2006	30	88	NC	—N/a	—N/a	33	—N/a	—N/a
2007	31	87	NC	—N/a	—N/a	41	—	—N/a
2008	32	NC	NC	—N/a	—N/a	NC	—	—
2009	33	NC	—	—N/a	—N/a	NC	—	—
2010	34	NC	—	—N/a	—N/a	NC	—	—

==== Individual podiums ====
- 4 podiums – (4 WC)

No.	Season	Date	Location	Race	Level	Place
1	2001–02	6 January 2002	Val di Fiemme, Italy	1.5 km Sprint F	World Cup	2nd
2	2001–02	13 March 2002	Oslo, Norway	1.5 km Sprint C	World Cup	3rd
3	2002–03	11 March 2003	Drammen, Norway	1.0 km Sprint C	World Cup	2nd
4	2004–05	16 March 2005	Gothenburg, Sweden	1.1 km Sprint F	World Cup	2nd
