= Pavel Korostelyov =

Russian cross-country skier

Personal information
- Nationality: Russian
- Born: 25 November 1978 (age 46); Yaroslavl, Russia

Sport
- Sport: Cross-country skiing

Pavel Korostelyov (born 25 November 1978) is a Russian cross-country skier. He competed in the men's sprint event at the 2006 Winter Olympics.
