= Yevgeni Safonov (skier) =

Kazakhstani cross-country skier (born 1985)

Personal information
- Nationality: Kazakhstani
- Born: 8 December 1985 (age 40) Shchuchinsk, Kazakhstan

Sport
- Sport: Cross-country skiing

Yevgeni Safonov (Евгений Вячеславович Сафонов, born 8 December 1985) is a Kazakhstani cross-country skier. He competed in the men's sprint event at the 2006 Winter Olympics.
