= FIS Nordic World Ski Championships 2005 – Men's 15 kilometre freestyle =

Men's 15 km freestyle interval start at the FIS Nordic World Ski Championships 2005
- Venue: Oberstdorf
- Date: 17 February 2005
- Competitors: 123
- Winning time: 34:49.7

Medalists
gold medal	Pietro Piller Cottrer	Italy
silver medal	Fulvio Valbusa	Italy
bronze medal	Tore Ruud Hofstad	Norway

The Men's 15 km freestyle interval start was part of the FIS Nordic World Ski Championships 2005's events held in Oberstdorf, Germany. The race went underway on 17 February 2005 at 15:00 CET. The defending world champion was Germany's Axel Teichmann, then in classical style.

== Results ==
Rank	Bib	Athlete	Country	Time	Deficit
1st place, gold medalist(s)	108	Pietro Piller Cottrer	Italy	34:49.7	—
2nd place, silver medalist(s)	120	Fulvio Valbusa	Italy	35:00.9	+11.2
3rd place, bronze medalist(s)	109	Tore Ruud Hofstad	Norway	35:03.9	+14.2
4	63	Lars Berger	Norway	35:06.6	+16.9
5	113	Lukas Bauer	Czech Republic	35:08.3	+18.6
6	117	Vincent Vittoz	France	35:08.7	+19.0
7	118	Axel Teichmann	Germany	35:16.2	+26.5
8	107	Jens Filbrich	Germany	35:25.8	+36.1
9	74	Teemu Kattilakoski	Finland	35:28.3	+38.6
10	119	Martin Bajcicak	Slovakia	35:29.4	+39.7
11	91	Ole Einar Bjørndalen	Norway	35:30.6	+40.9
12	93	Nikolay Bolshakov	Russia	35:42.3	+52.6
13	89	Franz Göring	Germany	35:42.7	+53.0
14	111	Giorgio Di Centa	Italy	35:42.9	+53.2
15	105	Anders Södergren	Sweden	35:47.9	+58.2
16	88	Remo Fischer	Switzerland	35:48.8	+59.1
17	95	Cristian Zorzi	Italy	35:54.8	+1:05.1
18	106	Jiri Magal	Czech Republic	35:55.4	+1:05.7
19	114	Tobias Angerer	Germany	35:55.5	+1:05.8
20	77	Emmanuel Jonnier	France	35:59.6	+1:09.9
21	45	Toni Livers	Switzerland	36:02.2	+1:12.5
22	115	Vasily Rochev	Russia	36:08.2	+1:18.5
23	121	Yevgeny Dementyev	Russia	36:09.3	+1:19.6
24	83	Maxim Odnodvortsev	Kazakhstan	36:09.5	+1:19.8
25	58	Alexandre Rousselet	France	36:13.4	+1:23.7
26	79	Markus Hasler	Liechtenstein	36:15.7	+1:26.0
27	51	Vicente Vilarrubla	Spain	36:17.8	+1:28.1
28	44	Olli Ohtonen	Finland	36:27.6	+1:37.9
29	50	Jan Egil Andresen	Norway	36:28.2	+1:38.5
30	49	Johannes Eder	Austria	36:29.0	+1:39.3
31	68	Gerhard Urain	Austria	36:31.8	+1:42.1
32	76	Juha Lallukka	Finland	36:32.9	+1:43.2
33	97	Roman Leybyuk	Ukraine	36:33.3	+1:43.6
34	112	René Sommerfeldt	Germany	36:33.4	+1:43.7
35	84	Nikolay Chebotko	Kazakhstan	36:34.1	+1:44.4
36	75	Sergei Dolidovich	Belarus	36:36.0	+1:46.3
37	100	Juan Jesús Gutiérrez	Spain	36:37.5	+1:47.8
38	82	Alexander Lasutkin	Belarus	36:38.7	+1:49.0
38	116	Mathias Fredriksson	Sweden	36:38.7	+1:49.0
40	54	Maciej Kreczmer	Poland	36:40.3	+1:50.6
41	62	Petr Michl	Czech Republic	36:43.9	+1:54.2
42	87	Roland Diethard	Austria	36:44.1	+1:54.4
43	98	Gion Andrea Bundi	Switzerland	36:45.5	+1:55.8
44	59	Sami Jauhojärvi	Finland	36:48.0	+1:58.3
45	94	Andrew Johnson	United States	36:48.9	+1:59.2
46	92	Johan Olsson	Sweden	36:49.5	+1:59.8
47	73	Diego Ruiz	Spain	36:57.9	+2:08.2
48	66	Alexander Legkov	Russia	36:59.7	+2:10.0
49	53	Dmitriy Eremenko	Kazakhstan	37:09.5	+2:19.8
50	52	Benoit Chauvet	France	37:11.6	+2:21.9
51	61	Christian Stebler	Switzerland	37:13.1	+2:23.4
52	101	Martin Koukal	Czech Republic	37:15.1	+2:25.4
53	99	Nejc Brodar	Slovenia	37:28.0	+2:38.3
54	42	Olexandr Putsko	Ukraine	37:32.7	+2:43.0
55	81	Chris Jeffries	Canada	37:35.8	+2:46.1
56	40	Lars Flora	United States	37:39.8	+2:50.1
57	55	Andrey Golovko	Kazakhstan	37:48.1	+2:58.4
58	90	Zsolt Antal	Romania	37:53.6	+3:03.9
59	85	Mikhail Gumenyak	Ukraine	37:54.5	+3:04.8
60	80	Michal Malak	Slovakia	37:56.5	+3:06.8
61	86	Tomio Kanamuru	Japan	37:59.1	+3:09.4
62	70	Mats Larsson	Sweden	38:05.1	+3:15.4
63	104	Dan Roycroft	Canada	38:05.2	+3:15.5
64	65	Martin Troels Møller	Denmark	38:07.5	+3:17.8
64	103	Kaspar Kokk	Estonia	38:07.5	+3:17.8
66	57	Ryo Saito	Japan	38:20.3	+3:30.6
67	47	Aleksey Ivanov	Belarus	38:26.2	+3:36.5
68	64	Gordon Jewett	Canada	38:29.2	+3:39.5
69	56	James Southam	United States	38:34.1	+3:44.4
70	22	Tian Ye	China	38:41.8	+3:52.1
—	...	...	...	...	...
120	9	Helio Freitas	Brazil	57:29.1	+22:39.4
121	125	Brahim Aitboubella	Morocco	58:22.8	+23:33.1
—	110	Christian Hoffmann	Austria	DNS	
—	71	Denis Vorobiev	Belarus	DSQ	
