= Ivan Bilosiuk =

Ukrainian cross-country skier (born 1984)

Personal information
- Nationality: Ukrainian
- Born: 18 January 1984 (age 42) Zakarpattia, Ukrainian SSR, Soviet Union

Sport
- Sport: Cross-country skiing
Medal record
Men's cross-country skiing
Representing Ukraine
Winter Universiade
Bronze medal – third place	2011 Erzurum	Mixed team

Ivan Bilosiuk (born 18 January 1984) is a Ukrainian cross-country skier. He competed in the men's sprint event at the 2006 Winter Olympics.
