= Kalle Lassila =

Finnish cross-country skier

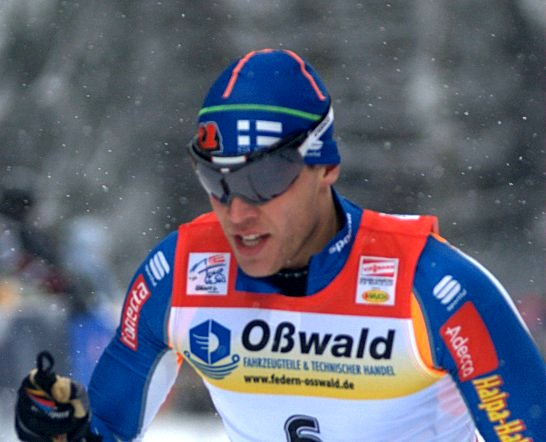
- Kalle Lassila in 2010

Personal information
- Nationality: Finland
- Born: January 23, 1985 (age 41) Veteli, Finland

Sport
- Sport: Skiing
- Club: Vetelin Urheilijat

World Cup career
- Seasons: 10 – (2005–2013, 2015)
- Indiv. starts: 50
- Indiv. podiums: 0
- Team starts: 4
- Team podiums: 0
- Overall titles: 0 – (49th in 2009)
- Discipline titles: 0

Kalle Lassila (born January 23, 1985, in Veteli) is a Finnish cross-country skier who has competed since 2005. He finished tenth in the individual sprint event at the 2010 Winter Olympics in Vancouver, British Columbia, Canada.

Lassila's best finish at the FIS Nordic World Ski Championships was 11th in the sprint event at Sapporo in 2007.

His best World Cup finish was fourth in a sprint event in Finland in November 2008.

== Cross-country skiing results ==
All results are sourced from the International Ski Federation (FIS).

=== Olympic Games ===
Year	Age	15 km individual	30 km skiathlon	50 km mass start	Sprint	4 × 10 km relay	Team sprint
2010	25	—	—	—	10	—	—

=== World Championships ===
Year	Age	15 km individual	30 km skiathlon	50 km mass start	Sprint	4 × 10 km relay	Team sprint
2007	22	—	—	—	11	—	—
2009	24	—	—	—	18	—	—
2013	28	—	—	—	28	—	—

=== World Cup ===
==== Season standings ====
Season	Age	Discipline standings			Ski Tour standings		
Season	Age	Overall	Distance	Sprint	Nordic Opening	Tour de Ski	World Cup Final
2005	20	152	—	77	—N/a	—N/a	—N/a
2006	21	137	—	61	—N/a	—N/a	—N/a
2007	22	93	—	45	—N/a	—	—N/a
2008	23	67	—	33	—N/a	—	—
2009	24	49	—	17	—N/a	—	DNF
2010	25	57	NC	20	—N/a	DNF	—
2011	26	NC	—	NC	DNF	—	—
2012	27	108	—	55	—	—	—
2013	28	76	—	35	DNF	—	—
2015	30	NC	—	—	—	—	—N/a
