= Philip Widmer =

Canadian cross-country skier

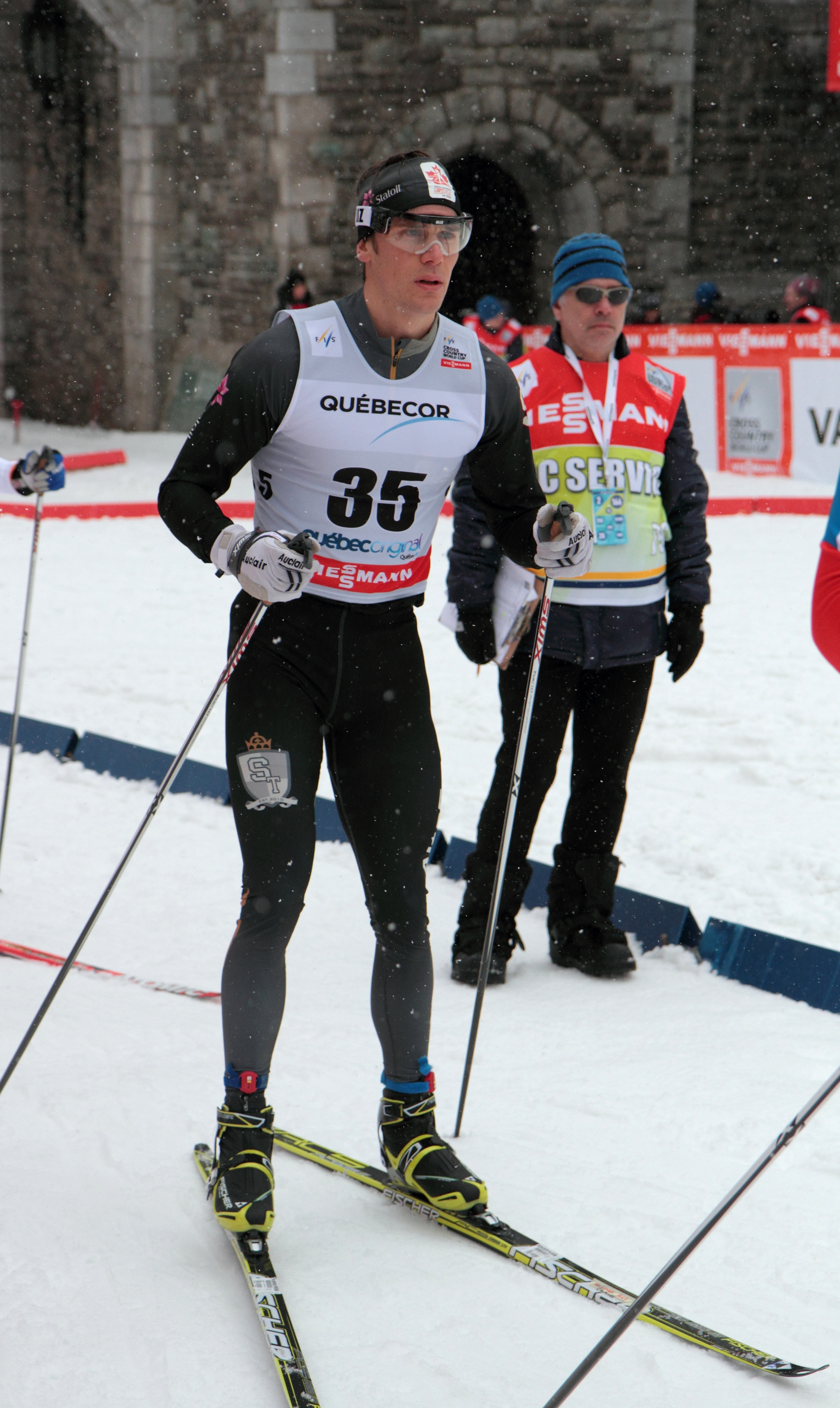
Philip Widmer

Philip Widmer (born October 18, 1983) is a Canadian cross-country skier.

Born in Banff, Alberta, Widmer made his World Cup debut in 2005. His best finish to date came in January 2009, when he teamed with Brent McMurtry to finish 9th in the team sprint in Vancouver. His best individual performances came in 2008, when he placed 13th in the sprint event at Canmore. Widmer is the older brother of Heidi Widmer.

Widmer competed in one event at the 2006 Olympics in Turin. He finished 47th in the qualifying portion of the sprint, failing to advance to the quarterfinals.
