= Jože Mehle =

Slovenian cross-country skier

- Country: Slovenian
- Born: 6 May 1980 (age 45) Ljubljana, Yugoslavia
- Height: 183 cm (6 ft 0 in)

Jože Mehle (born 6 May 1980) is a Slovenian cross-country skier. He competed in the men's sprint event at the 2006 Winter Olympics.
