= Mihai Galiceanu =

Romanian cross-country skier (born 1982)

Personal information
- Nationality: Romanian
- Born: 27 September 1982 (age 42); Reșița, Romania

Sport
- Sport: Cross-country skiing

Mihai Galiceanu (born 27 September 1982) is a Romanian cross-country skier. He competed in the men's sprint event at the 2006 Winter Olympics.
