= Martin Stockinger =

Austrian cross-country skier

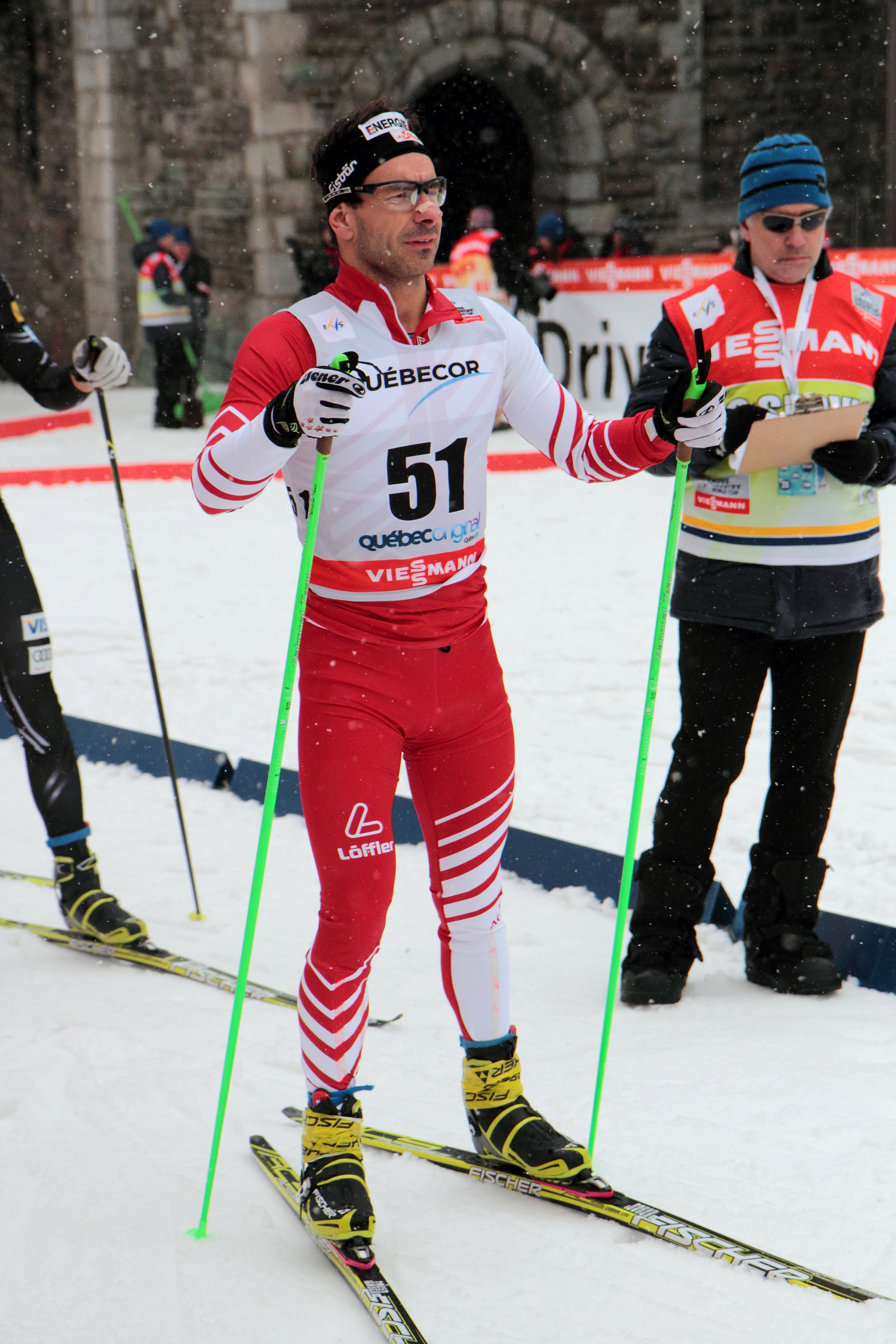
- Martin Stockinger in 2012

Personal information
- Nationality: Austrian
- Born: 10 February 1984 (age 41); Rohrbach, Austria

Sport
- Sport: Cross-country skiing

Martin Stockinger (born 10 February 1984) is an Austrian cross-country skier. He competed in the men's sprint event at the 2006 Winter Olympics.
