= Edmond Khachatryan =

Armenian cross-country skier (born 1983)

Personal information
- Nationality: Armenian
- Born: 21 October 1983 (age 42) Gyumri, Armenia

Sport
- Sport: Cross-country skiing

Edmond Khachatryan (Armenian: Էդմոնդ Խաչատրյան, born 21 October 1983) is an Armenian cross-country skier. He competed in the men's sprint event at the 2006 Winter Olympics.
