= Harald Wurm =

Austrian cross-country skier

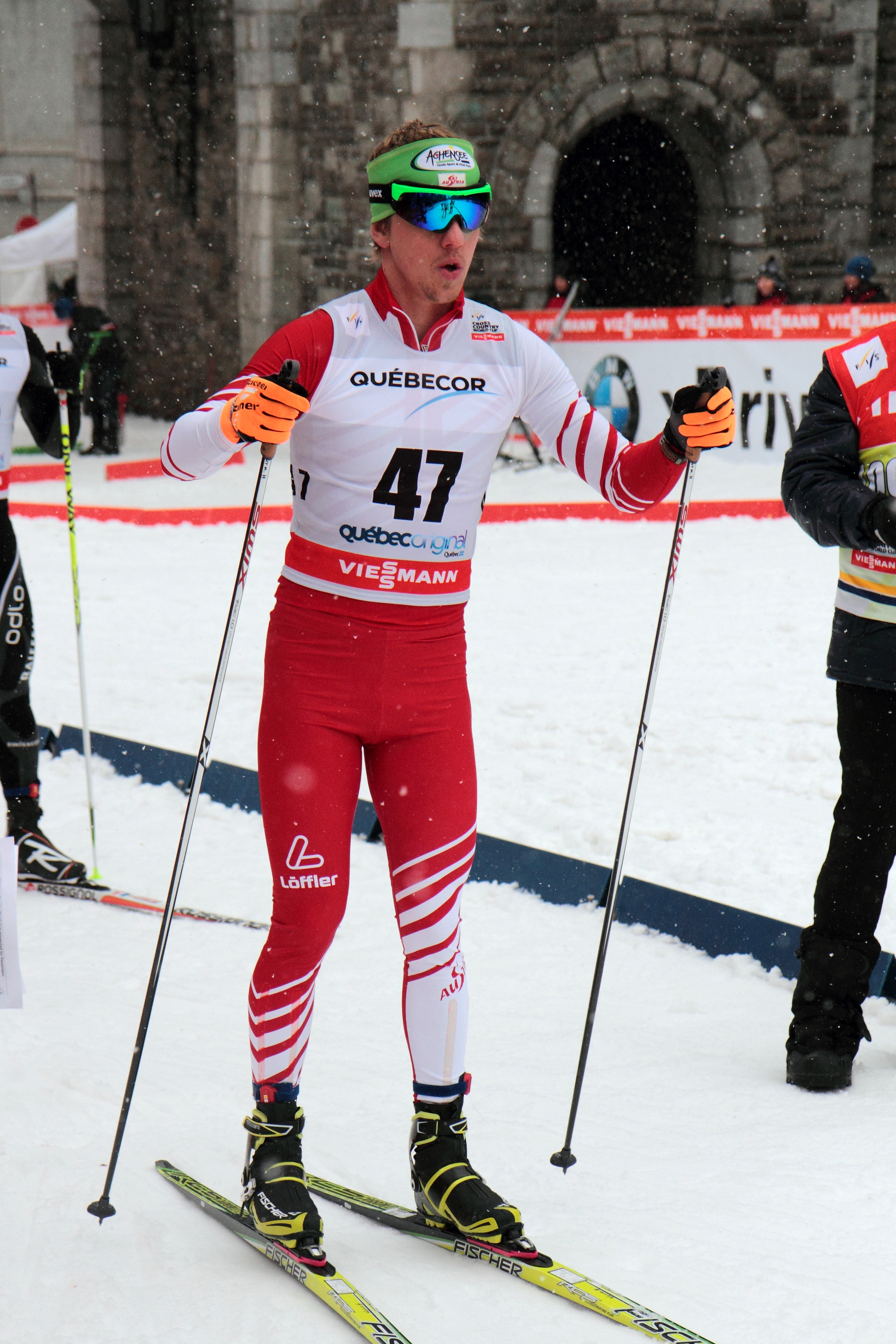
- Harald Wurm in 2012

Personal information
- Nationality: Austria
- Born: 8 September 1984 (age 41) Schwaz, Austria

Sport
- Sport: Skiing
- Club: WSV Vomp-Tirol

World Cup career
- Seasons: 2003–2015
- Indiv. starts: 76
- Indiv. podiums: 0
- Team starts: 12
- Team podiums: 0
- Overall titles: 0 – (70th in 2013)
- Discipline titles: 0
Medal record
Men's cross-country skiing
Representing Austria
Junior World Championships
Gold medal – first place	2006 Kranj	Individual sprint

Harald Wurm (born 8 September 1984) was an Austrian cross-country skier. He started for the WSV Vomp until 2015, when he was banned by the Austrian Anti-Doping Legal Committee for four years for using cobalt.

== World Cup results ==
All results are sourced from the International Ski Federation (FIS).

=== World Cup standings ===
Season	Age	Season standings			Ski Tour standings		
Season	Age	Overall	Distance	Sprint	Nordic Opening	Tour de Ski	World Cup Final
2003	19	NC	—N/a	NC	—N/a	—N/a	—N/a
2004	20	NC	DNP	NC	—N/a	—N/a	—N/a
2005	21	78	DNP	35	—N/a	—N/a	—N/a
2006	22	85	DNP	32	—N/a	—N/a	—N/a
2007	23	149	DNP	76	—N/a	DNP	—N/a
2008	24	117	NC	80	—N/a	58	DNP
2009	25	148	NC	87	—N/a	54	DNP
2010	26	165	DNP	94	—N/a	DNP	DNP
2011	27	122	DNP	72	DNP	DNP	DNP
2012	28	NC	NC	NC	DNP	DNP	DNP
2013	29	70	DNP	31	DNP	DNP	DNP
2014	30	98	NC	46	DNP	DNF	DNP
2015	31	NC	NC	NC	DNF	DNP	—N/a
