= Chris Cook (skier) =

American cross-country skier (born 1980)

Personal information
- Born: June 15, 1980 (age 46) Neenah, Wisconsin, United States

Sport
- Sport: Cross-country skiing

Chris Cook (born June 15, 1980) is an American cross-country skier. He competed in the men's sprint event at the 2006 Winter Olympics.
