= Vitaliy Martsiv =

Ukrainian cross-country skier (born 1983)

Personal information
- Nationality: Ukrainian
- Born: 19 June 1983 (age 41); Sumy, Ukraine

Sport
- Sport: Cross-country skiing

Vitaliy Martsiv (born 19 June 1983) is a Ukrainian cross-country skier. He competed in the men's sprint event at the 2006 Winter Olympics.
