= Anti Saarepuu =

Estonian cross-country skier (born 1983)

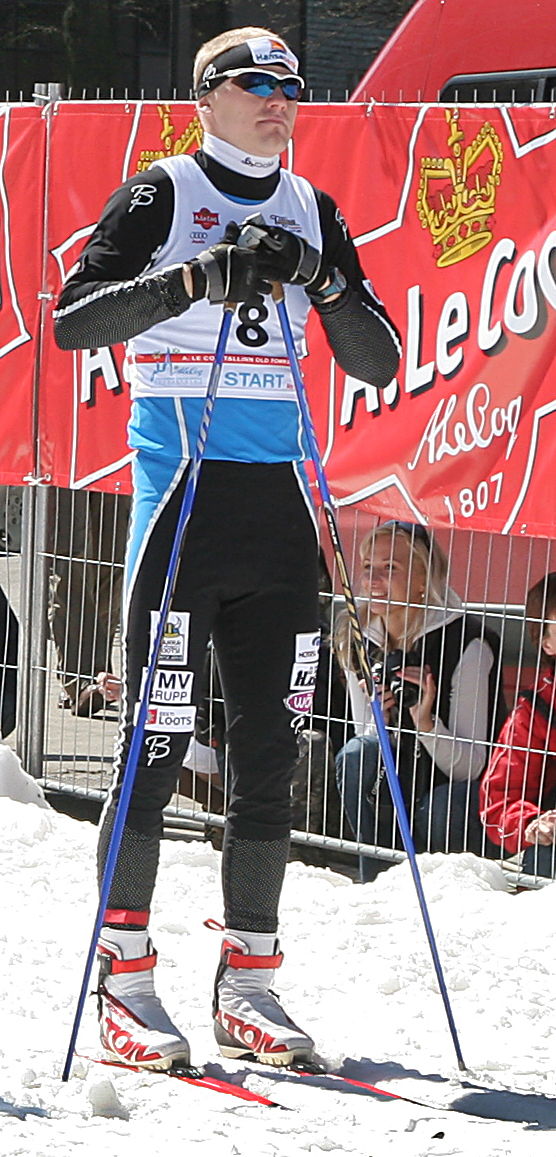
Anti Saarepuu in 2007 in Tallinn

Anti Saarepuu (born 26 March 1983 in Võru) is a retired Estonian cross-country skier who has competed since 2003. He competed at the 2006 Winter Olympics in Turin and at the 2010 Winter Olympics in Vancouver. Saarepuu's best finish at the Winter Olympics was eighth in the individual sprint event at Turin in 2006.

Saarepuu's best finish at the FIS Nordic World Ski Championships was seventh in the individual sprint event at Liberec in 2009.

His best World Cup finish was seventh in a sprint event at Sweden in 2005.
