= Denis Klobučar =

Croatian cross-country skier (born 1983)

Personal information
- Nationality: Croatian
- Born: 16 April 1983 (age 41); Rijeka, Yugoslavia

Sport
- Sport: Cross-country skiing

Denis Klobučar (born 16 April 1983) is a Croatian cross-country skier. He competed at the 2002 Winter Olympics and the 2006 Winter Olympics.
