= Hovhannes Sargsyan =

Armenian cross-country skier (born 1987)

Personal information
- Nationality: Armenian
- Born: 14 November 1987 (age 37); Gyumri, Armenia

Sport
- Sport: Cross-country skiing

Hovhannes Sargsyan (born 14 November 1987) is an Armenian cross-country skier. He competed in the men's sprint event at the 2006 Winter Olympics.
