= Mikhail Gumenyak =

Ukrainian cross-country skier (born 1980)

Personal information
- Nationality: Ukrainian
- Born: 1 October 1980 (age 45) Solotvyno, Ukrainian SSR, Soviet Union

Sport
- Sport: Cross-country skiing
Medal record
Men's cross-country skiing
Representing Ukraine
Winter Universiade
Bronze medal – third place	2005 Innsbruck	Relay

Mikhail Gumenyak (born 1 October 1980) is a Ukrainian cross-country skier. He competed in the men's sprint event at the 2006 Winter Olympics.
