= Paul Murray (skier) =

Australian cross-country skier (born 1977)

Paul Murray (born 8 May 1977) is an Australian cross-country skier who has competed since 1997. Competing in two Winter Olympics, he earned his best finish of 20th in the team sprint event at Vancouver in 2010 while earning his best individual finish of 51st in the individual sprint event at Turin four years earlier.

Murray's best finish at the FIS Nordic World Ski Championships was 14th in the team sprint at Sapporo in 2007 while his best individual finish was 31st in an individual sprint event at Oberstdorf two years earlier.

His best World Cup finish was 16th in a team sprint event in Canada in 2009 while his best individual finish was 29th in an individual sprint event at Germany in 2005.
