= Hélio Freitas =

Brazilian cross-country skier (born 1969)

Personal information
- Born: 23 October 1969 (age 55); Porto Alegre, Brazil

Sport
- Sport: Cross-country skiing

Hélio Freitas (born 23 October 1969) is a Brazilian cross-country skier. He competed in the men's 15 kilometre classical event at the 2006 Winter Olympics.
