= Torin Koos =

American cross-country skier (born 1980)

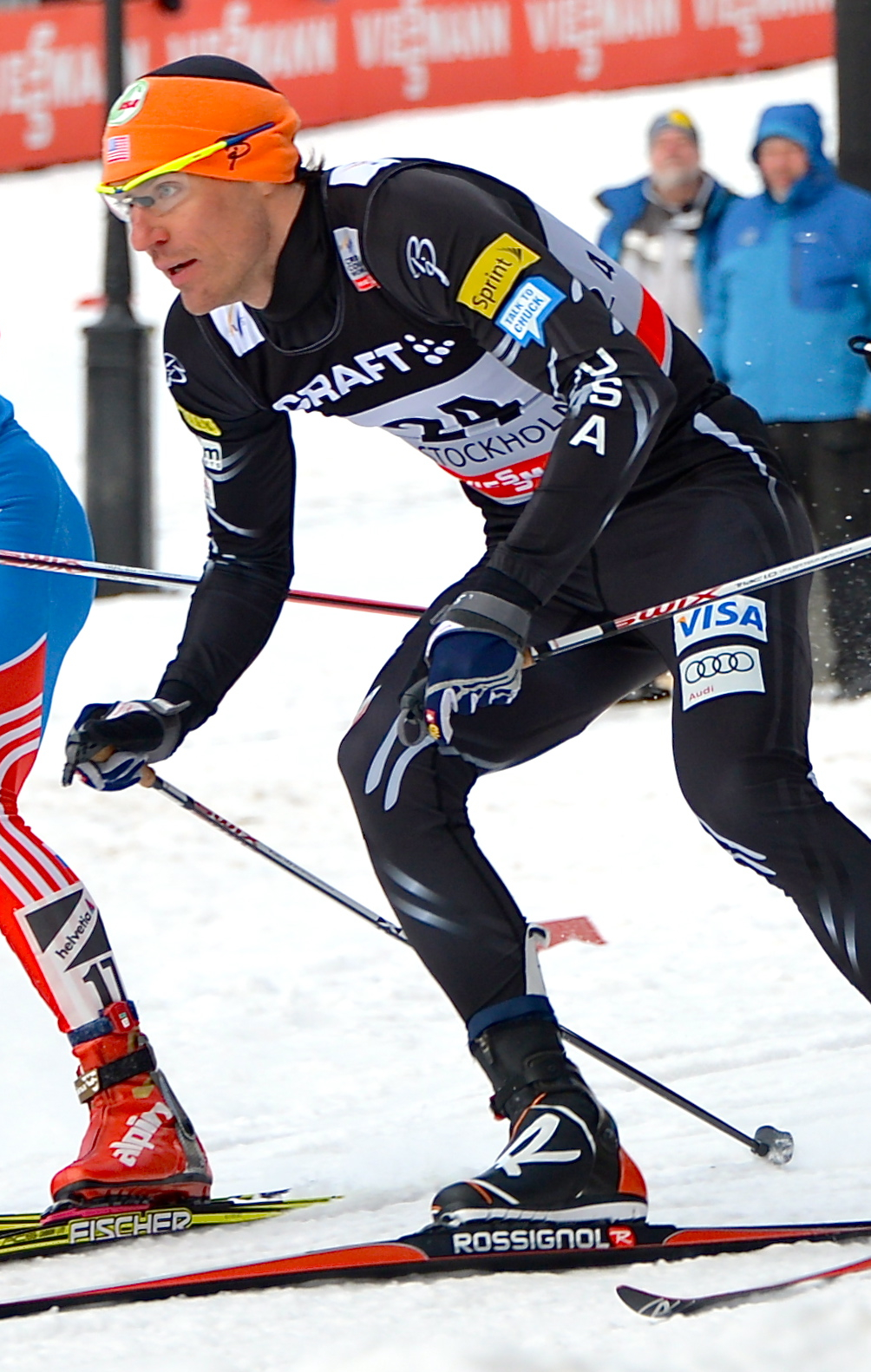
Koos in 2013

Torin Koos (born July 19, 1980, in Minneapolis) is an American cross-country skier who has competed since 1998. His best World Cup finish was third in a sprint event in Estonia in 2007.

Koos has competed in four Winter Olympics, earning his best finish of ninth in the team sprint event at Vancouver in 2010. His best finish at the FIS Nordic World Ski Championships was 11th in the team sprint event at Liberec in 2009.

It was announced on 19 January 2010 that Koos qualified for the 2010 Winter Olympics.

He also competed in the 2014 Sochi Olympics.
