= Nejc Brodar =

Slovenian cross-country skier

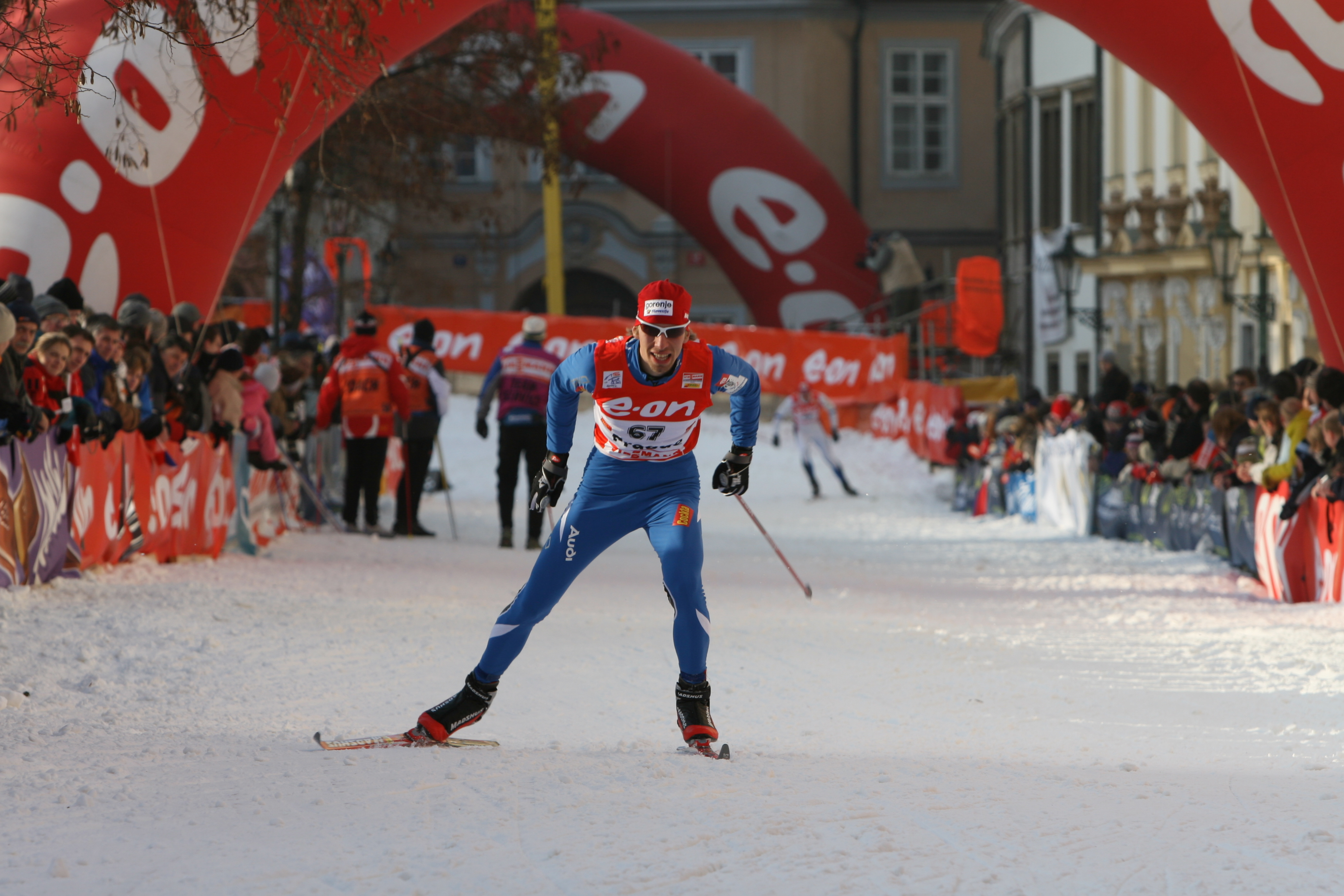
- Nejc Brodar in 2007

Personal information
- Nationality: Slovenian
- Born: 10 July 1982 (age 42); Škofja Loka, Yugoslavia

Sport
- Sport: Cross-country skiing

Nejc Brodar (born 10 July 1982) is a Slovenian cross-country skier. He competed in the men's sprint event at the 2006 Winter Olympics.
