= Lars Flora =

American cross-country skier (born 1978)

Personal information
- Born: January 6, 1978 (age 48) Portland, Oregon, United States

Sport
- Sport: Cross-country skiing

Lars Flora (born January 6, 1978) is an American cross-country skier. He competed at the 2002 Winter Olympics and the 2006 Winter Olympics.
