= Olexandr Putsko =

Ukrainian cross-country skier (born 1981)

Medal record

Men's cross-country skiing

Representing Ukraine

Winter Universiade
Bronze medal – third place	2005 Innsbruck	Relay

Olexandr Putsko (born 4 August 1981) is a Ukrainian cross-country skier who has competed since 2000. Competing in two Winter Olympics, he earned his best finish of 52nd twice, both in the 30 km mixed pursuit events (2006, 2010).

Putsko's best finish at the FIS Nordic World Ski Championships was 14th in the 4 x 10 km relay at Val di Fiemme in 2003 while his best individual finish was 15th in the 15 km event at Sapporo in 2007).

His best World cup finish was 14th in 1 4 x 10 km relay at Norway in 2005 while his best individual finish was 48th in a 15 km event at Russia in 2009..
