= Zsolt Antal =

Romanian cross-country skier (born 1972)

Personal information
- Nationality: Romanian
- Born: 21 March 1972 (age 53); Gheorgheni, Romania

Sport
- Sport: Cross-country skiing

Zsolt Antal (born 21 March 1972) is a Romanian cross-country skier. He competed at the 1994, 1998, 2002 and the 2006 Winter Olympics.
