= Janusz Krężelok =

Polish cross-country skier

Janusz Adam Krężelok (born 18 December 1974 in Istebna) is a Polish cross-country skier who has competed since 1994. His best individual finish at the FIS Nordic World Ski Championships was a seventh in the individual sprint in 2005 while his best overall finish was fifth in the team sprint (with Maciej Kreczmer) event in 2007.

Krężelok's best individual finish at the Winter Olympics was ninth in the sprint event at Salt Lake City in 2002.

He has a total of nine individual career victories at various levels up to 15 km since 1999.
