= Yevgeniy Koshevoy =

Kazakhstani cross-country skier (born 1984)

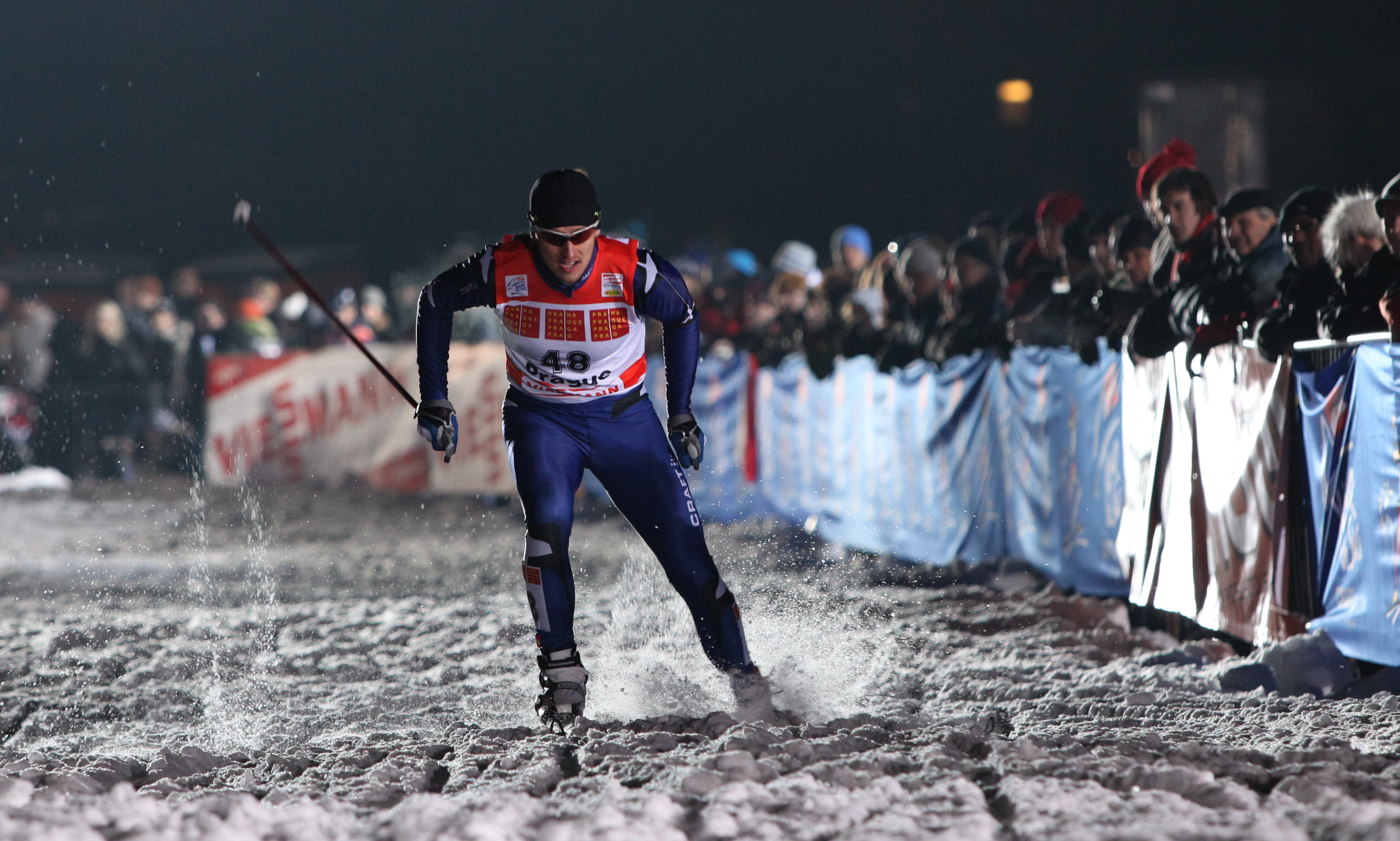
Koshevoy in 2010

Yevgeniy Nikolayevich Koshevoy (Russian: Евгений Николаевич Кошевой; born 6 October 1984) is a Kazakh cross-country skier who has competed since 2001. Competing in two Winter Olympics, he earned his best finish of sixth in the team sprint event at Turin in 2006. He was born in Shchuchinsk, Kokchetav Oblast.

Koshevoy's best finish at the FIS Nordic World Ski Championships was seventh in the team sprint at Oberstdorf in 2005. He did compete at the 2007 championships in Sapporo, but his records were stripped in wake of being banned from doping prior to the event, serving a two-year suspension from 2007 to 2009.

His best World Cup finish was sixth in the individual sprint at Germany in 2006.
