= Priit Narusk =

Estonian cross-country skier (born 1977)

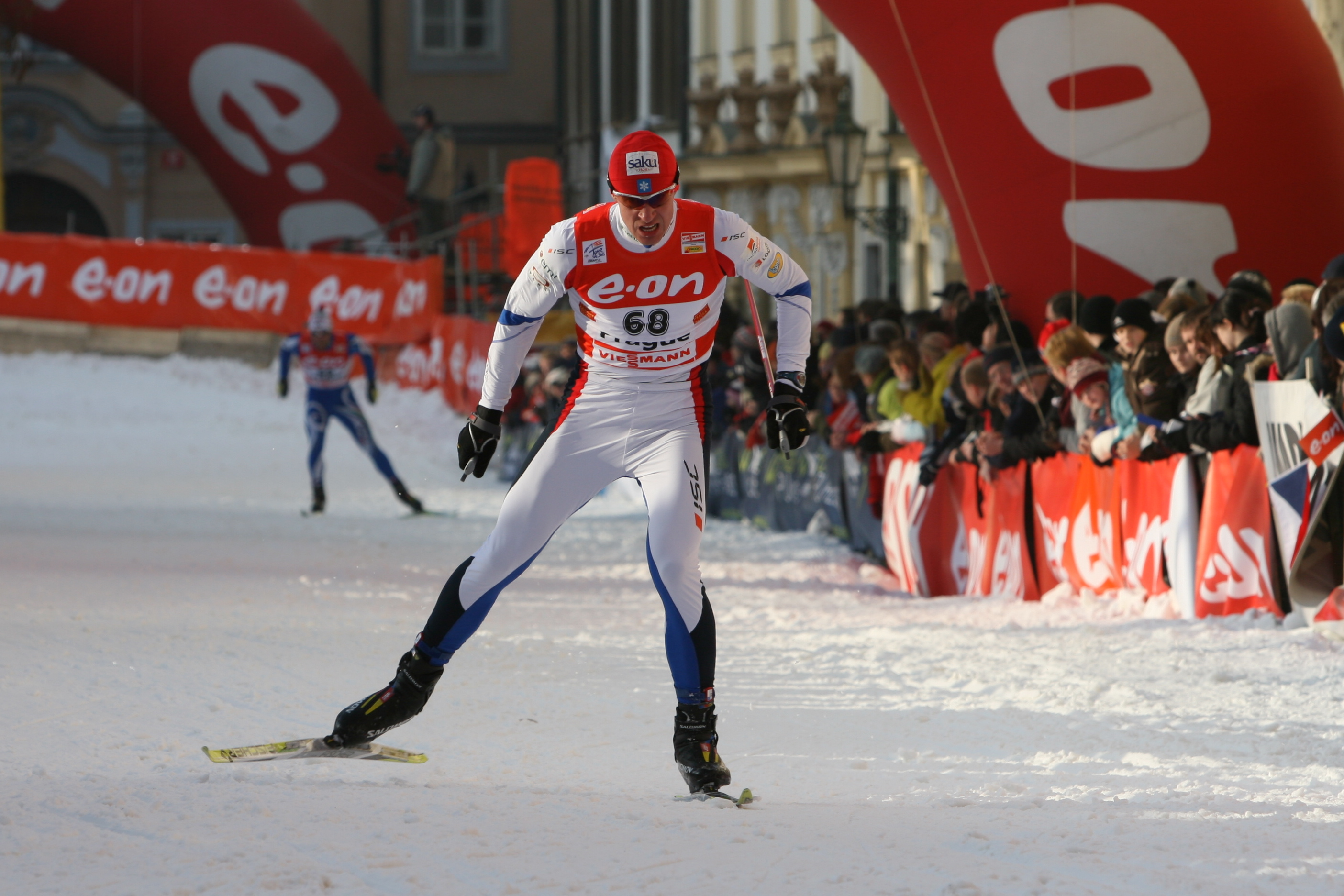
Priit Narusk in the qualification for the Tour de Ski in Prague.

Priit Narusk (born 8 December 1977, in Võru) is a retired Estonian cross-country skier. He represented Estonia at the 2002 Winter Olympics in Salt Lake City, and at the 2006 Winter Olympics in Turin.
