= Maciej Kreczmer =

Polish cross-country skier

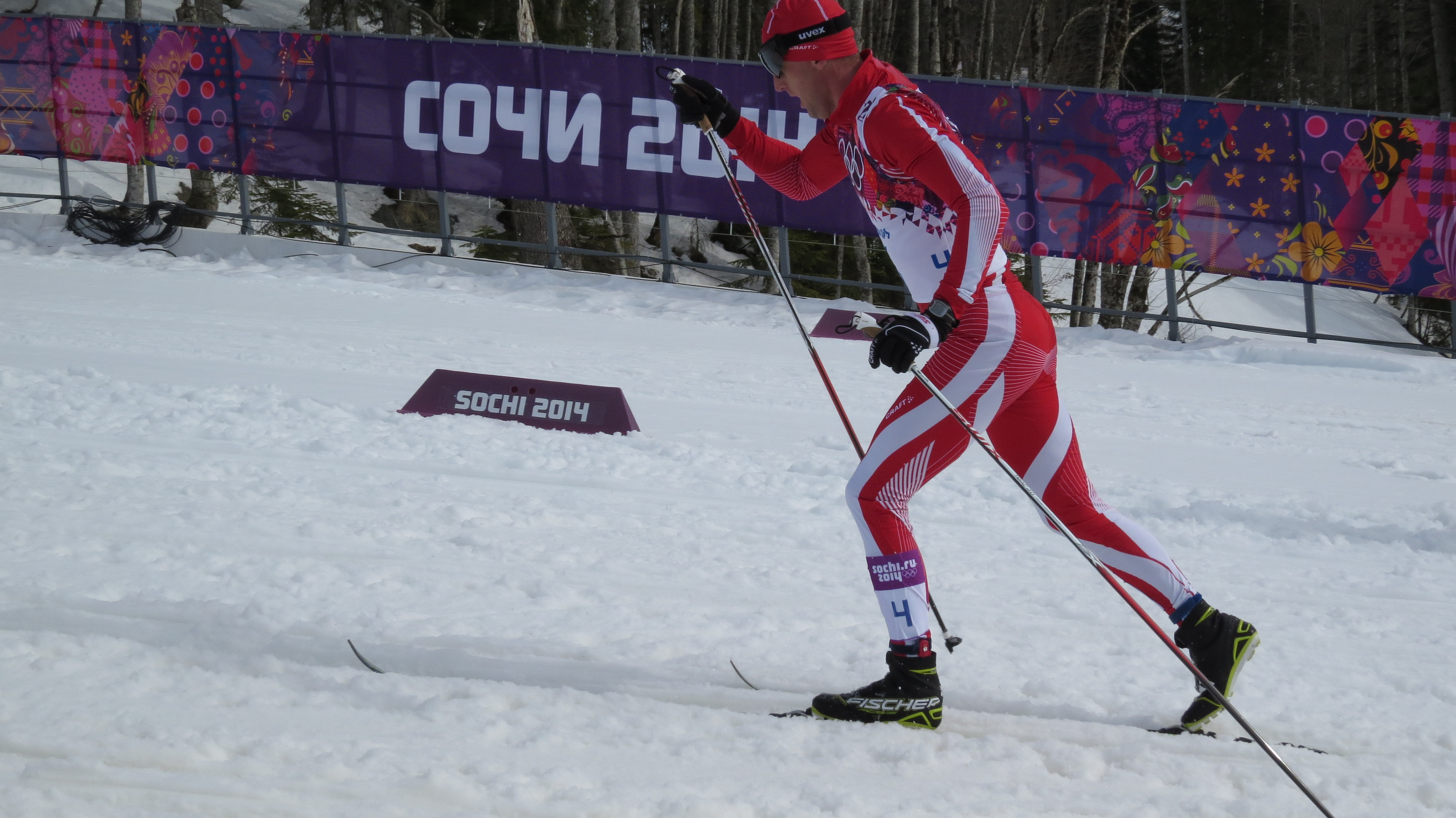
Kreczmer at the 2014 Winter Olympics

Maciej Kreczmer (born 4 April 1981 in Rajcza) is a Polish cross-country skier who has competed since 1999. His best individual finish at the FIS Nordic World Ski Championships was 17th in the sprint event in 2005 while his best overall finish was fifth in the team sprint event (with Janusz Krężelok) in 2007.

Kreczmer's best individual finish at the Winter Olympics was 25th in the sprint event at Vancouver in 2010.

He has two individual career victories at various levels both in sprint (2000, 2005).
