= Dušan Kožíšek =

Czech cross country skier (born 1983)

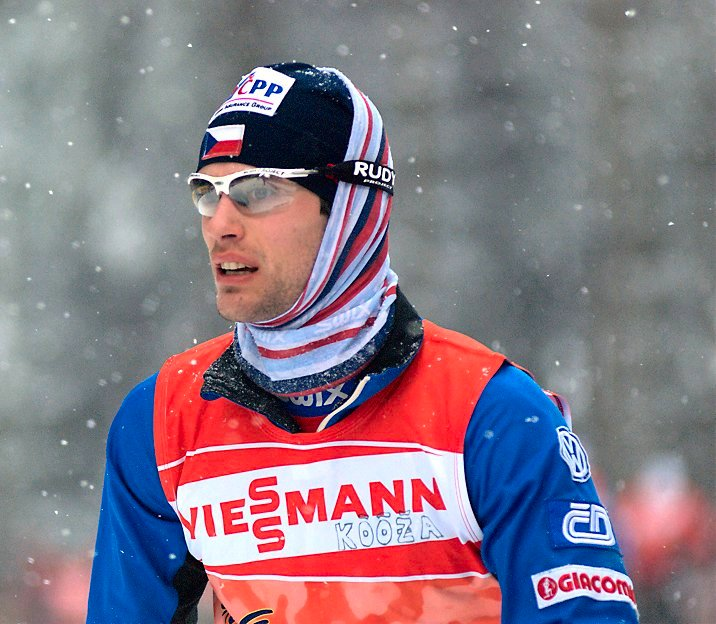
- Dušan Kožíšek in 2010

Personal information
- Nationality: Czech Republic
- Born: 25 April 1983 (age 43) Jilemnice, Czechoslovak Socialist Republic

Sport
- Sport: Skiing
- Club: Dukla Liberec

World Cup career
- Seasons: 14 – (2004–2017)
- Indiv. starts: 128
- Indiv. podiums: 1
- Indiv. wins: 0
- Team starts: 24
- Team podiums: 0
- Overall titles: 0 – (58th in 2008)
- Discipline titles: 0
Medal record
Men's cross-country skiing
Representing Czech Republic
World Championships
Bronze medal – third place	2005 Oberstdorf	Team sprint
Bronze medal – third place	2007 Sapporo	Team sprint
U23 World Championships
Gold medal – first place	2005 Oberstdorf	Individual sprint

Dušan Kožíšek (pronounced [ˈduʃan ˈkoʒiːʃɛk], born 25 April 1983 in Jilemnice) is a Czech cross-country skier who has been competing since 2002. He won a bronze medal in the team sprint (with Martin Koukal) at the 2005 FIS Nordic World Ski Championships in Oberstdorf and finished 38th in the individual sprint in those same games. Kožíšek repeated the success in the team sprint at the 2007 FIS Nordic World Ski Championships in Sapporo when he won a bronze medal, this time with Milan Šperl. Kožíšek also finished 17th in the individual sprint at those same games.

Kožíšek's best individual finish at the Winter Olympics was 22nd in the individual sprint in 2006. He has two career victories (2004, 2005) in distances up to 15 km.

== Cross-country skiing results ==
All results are sourced from the International Ski Federation (FIS).

=== Olympic Games ===
Year	Age	15 km individual	30 km skiathlon	50 km mass start	Sprint	4 × 10 km relay	Team sprint
2006	22	—	—	—	22	9	10
2010	26	—	—	—	35	—	6
2014	29	—	—	—	41	8	—

=== World Championships ===
- 2 medals – (2 bronze)

Year	Age	15 km individual	30 km skiathlon	50 km mass start	Sprint	4 × 10 km relay	Team sprint
2005	24	—	—	—	38	—	Bronze
2007	26	DNS	—	—	16	—	Bronze
2009	25	—	—	34	41	—	—
2011	27	—	—	—	24	—	13
2013	29	—	—	—	65	—	8
2015	31	41	—	—	51	9	6

=== World Cup ===
==== Season standings ====
Season	Age	Discipline standings			Ski Tour standings			
Season	Age	Overall	Distance	Sprint	Nordic Opening	Tour de Ski	World Cup Final	Ski Tour Canada
2004	20	NC	NC	NC	—N/a	—N/a	—N/a	—N/a
2005	21	94	99	47	—N/a	—N/a	—N/a	—N/a
2006	22	99	NC	40	—N/a	—N/a	—N/a	—N/a
2007	23	75	NC	35	—N/a	48	—N/a	—N/a
2008	24	58	81	25	—N/a	DNF	27	—N/a
2009	25	81	80	45	—N/a	—	56	—N/a
2010	26	93	109	49	—N/a	DNF	—	—N/a
2011	27	65	NC	26	DNF	DNF	—	—N/a
2012	28	NC	NC	NC	—	—	—	—N/a
2013	29	140	NC	84	74	—	—	—N/a
2014	30	164	NC	104	84	DNF	—	—N/a
2015	31	85	NC	38	—	DNF	—N/a	—N/a
2016	32	NC	NC	NC	—	DNF	—N/a	—
2017	33	NC	NC	NC	—	DNF	—	—N/a

==== Individual podiums ====
- 1 podium – (1 WC)

No.	Season	Date	Location	Race	Level	Place
1	2010–11	15 January 2011	Liberec, Czech Republic	1.6 km Sprint F	World Cup	3rd
