= Martin Jakš =

Czech cross-country skier

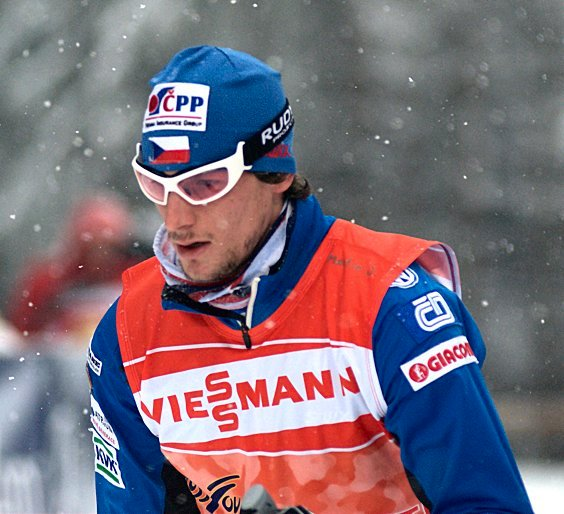
- Martin Jakš in January, 2010

Personal information
- Nationality: Czech Republic
- Born: 6 September 1986 (age 39) Plzeň, Czechoslovakia

Sport
- Sport: Skiing
- Club: Dukla Liberec

World Cup career
- Seasons: 13 – (2006–2018)
- Indiv. starts: 177
- Indiv. podiums: 2
- Indiv. wins: 0
- Team starts: 21
- Team podiums: 3
- Team wins: 1
- Overall titles: 0 – (16th in 2011)
- Discipline titles: 0
Medal record
Men's cross-country skiing
Representing Czech Republic
Olympic Games
Bronze medal – third place	2010 Vancouver	4 × 10 km relay
U23 World Championships
Gold medal – first place	2008 Mals	15 km classical
Junior World Championships
Silver medal – second place	2006 Kranj	10 km classical
Bronze medal – third place	2006 Kranj	20 km skiathlon
Bronze medal – third place	2006 Kranj	4 × 5 km relay

Martin Jakš (Czech pronunciation: [ˈmarcɪn ˈjakʃ]; born 6 September 1986) is a Czech cross-country skier who has competed since 2004. His best World Cup finish was third in a 3.3 km event in Italy in 2008. He also has two wins in the 4 × 10 km relay, earning them in 2007 and 2008.

His best finish at the FIS Nordic World Ski Championships was 22nd in the 15 km event at Liberec in 2009.

== Cross-country skiing results ==
All results are sourced from the International Ski Federation (FIS).

=== Olympic Games ===
- 1 medal – (1 bronze)

Year	Age	15 km individual	30 km skiathlon	50 km mass start	Sprint	4 × 10 km relay	Team sprint
2010	23	29	27	—	—	Bronze	—
2014	27	—	27	37	—	8	9
2018	31	16	9	8	—	10	7

=== World Championships ===
Year	Age	15 km individual	30 km skiathlon	50 km mass start	Sprint	4 × 10 km relay	Team sprint
2007	20	—	DNF	—	—	—	—
2009	22	22	—	—	—	11	12
2011	24	18	31	—	—	8	—
2013	26	30	27	26	—	11	—
2015	28	17	31	16	—	9	—
2017	30	28	—	14	—	11	—

=== World Cup ===
==== Season standings ====
Season	Age	Discipline standings			Ski Tour standings			
Season	Age	Overall	Distance	Sprint	Nordic Opening	Tour de Ski	World Cup Final	Ski Tour Canada
2006	19	157	114	—	—N/a	—N/a	—N/a	—N/a
2007	20	110	64	—	—N/a	—	—N/a	—N/a
2008	21	23	27	36	—N/a	11	17	—N/a
2009	22	115	69	NC	—N/a	—	—	—N/a
2010	23	140	89	NC	—N/a	DNF	—	—N/a
2011	24	16	15	55	22	8	26	—N/a
2012	25	22	23	58	24	9	19	—N/a
2013	26	60	48	75	—	DNF	—	—N/a
2014	27	29	33	55	DNF	10	17	—N/a
2015	28	50	34	95	37	DNF	—N/a	—N/a
2016	29	48	35	NC	36	19	—N/a	37
2017	30	87	56	NC	—	DNF	—	—N/a
2018	31	46	41	NC	34	16	—	—N/a

==== Individual podiums ====
- 2 podiums – (1 WC, 1 SWC)

No.	Season	Date	Location	Race	Level	Place
1	2007–08	14 March 2008	Bormio, Italy	3.3 km Individual F	World Cup	3rd
2	2010–11	3 January 2010	Oberstdorf, Germany	10 km + 10 km Pursuit C/F	Stage World Cup	3rd

==== Team podiums ====
- 1 victory – (1 RL)
- 3 podiums – (3 RL)

No.	Season	Date	Location	Race	Level	Place	Teammates
1	2007–08	9 December 2007	Davos, Switzerland	4 × 10 km Relay C/F	World Cup	1st	Bauer / Šperl / Koukal
2	2007–08	24 February 2008	Falun, Sweden	4 × 10 km Relay C/F	World Cup	3rd	Bauer / Magál / Koukal
3	2012–13	20 January 2013	La Clusaz, France	4 × 7.5 km Relay C/F	World Cup	3rd	Magál / Bauer / Razým
