= Drew Goldsack =

Canadian cross-country skier

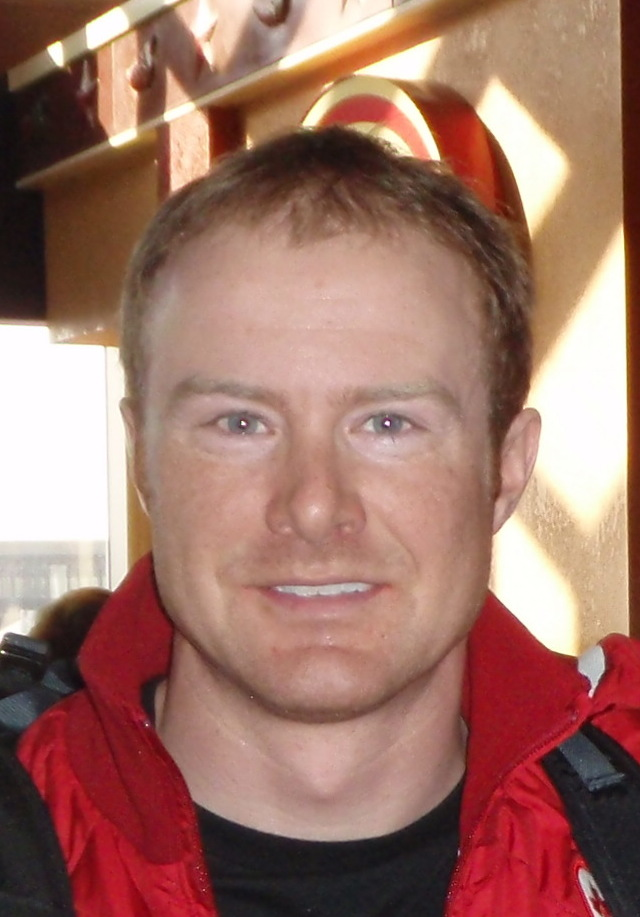
- Goldsack in 2010

Personal information
- Nationality: Canada
- Born: 23 August 1981 (age 44) Red Deer, Alberta, Canada

Sport
- Sport: Skiing
- Club: Rocky Mountain Racers

World Cup career
- Seasons: 8 – (2004–2010, 2012)
- Indiv. starts: 38
- Indiv. podiums: 0
- Team starts: 9
- Team podiums: 0
- Overall titles: 0 – (104th in 2008)
- Discipline titles: 0
Medal record
Men's cross-country skiing
Representing Canada
U23 World Championships
Gold medal – first place	2004 Park City	Individual sprint
Bronze medal – third place	2004 Park City	Team sprint

Drew Goldsack (born August 23, 1981) is a Canadian cross-country skier who has competed since 2001. His best finish at the FIS Nordic World Ski Championships was sixth in the team sprint (with Devon Kershaw) in 2007 while his best individual finish was 21st in the sprint in 2005. Drew recorded a 1st-place finish at the 2004 U23 FIS World Championships in the individual sprint as well as a 3rd-place finish in the team sprint (with Devon Kershaw). Drew's best FIS World Cup result was a fifth in the team sprint (with Len Väljas in Duesseldorf, GER in 2011 with. His best individual World Cup result was 11th place in the sprint event in Canmore in 2007.

Competing in two Winter Olympics, Goldsack's best individual finish at the Winter Olympics was 31st in the sprint event at Turin in 2006.

He won the NorAm Sprint championship (2011)

He has a number of individual career victories in sprint events at various levels in Canada (2003, 2006, 2009, 2010, 2011). He has a number of individual career victories in various events at NorAm levels in North America (3003, 2006, 2009, 2010, 2011).

He won the aggregate Senior Canadian National Championship (2003)

He won the aggregate Junior Canadian National Championship (2001)

== Cross-country skiing results ==
All results are sourced from the International Ski Federation (FIS).

=== Olympic Games ===
Year	Age	15 km individual	30 km skiathlon	50 km mass start	Sprint	4 × 10 km relay	Team sprint
2006	24	53	56	—	31	—	—
2010	28	—	—	—	40	—	—

=== World Championships ===
Year	Age	15 km	Pursuit	30 km	50 km	Sprint	4 × 10 km relay	Team sprint
2003	21	58	—	—	—	59	14	—N/a
2005	23	76	—	—N/a	DNF	21	—	—
2007	25	59	—	—N/a	—	—	11	6

=== World Cup ===
==== Season standings ====
Season	Age	Discipline standings			Ski Tour standings		
Season	Age	Overall	Distance	Sprint	Nordic Opening	Tour de Ski	World Cup Final
2004	22	NC	NC	NC	—N/a	—N/a	—N/a
2005	23	NC	NC	NC	—N/a	—N/a	—N/a
2006	24	125	NC	53	—N/a	—N/a	—N/a
2007	25	NC	NC	NC	—N/a	DNF	—N/a
2008	26	104	NC	67	—N/a	—	—
2009	27	NC	—	NC	—N/a	—	—
2010	28	NC	—	NC	—N/a	—	—
2012	30	NC	NC	NC	DNF	—	—
