= Milan Šperl =

Czech cross-country skier

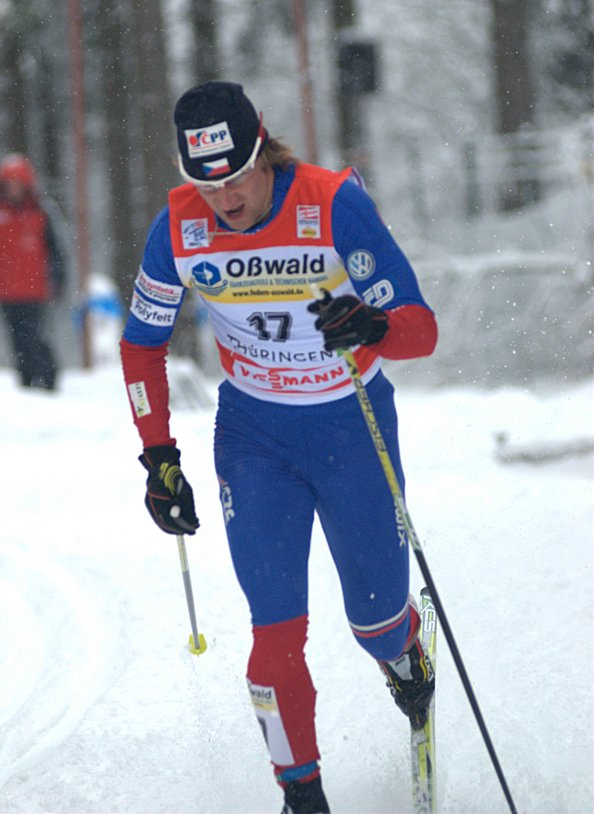
- Milan Šperl in 2010

Personal information
- Nationality: Czech Republic
- Born: 26 February 1980 (age 46) Karlovy Vary, Czechoslovak Socialist Republic

Sport
- Sport: Skiing
- Club: Dukla Liberec

World Cup career
- Seasons: 11 – (2000–2010)
- Indiv. starts: 71
- Indiv. podiums: 0
- Team starts: 16
- Team podiums: 2
- Team wins: 1
- Overall titles: 0 – (73rd in 2007)
- Discipline titles: 0
Medal record
Men's cross-country skiing
Representing Czech Republic
World Championships
Bronze medal – third place	2007 Sapporo	Team sprint

Milan Šperl (Czech pronunciation: [ˈmɪlan ˈʃpɛrl̩]; born 26 February 1980 in Karlovy Vary) is a Czech cross-country skier who has been competing since 2000.

== Professional career ==
He won a bronze medal in the team sprint (with Dušan Kožíšek) at the 2007 FIS Nordic World Ski Championships in Sapporo. Šperl's best individual finish at the FIS Nordic World Ski Championships was a sixth in the 50 km event at Oberstdorf in 2005.

He is also a six times champion of the Czech Republic in individual races (2002 1.8 km sprint, 2003 50 km classical 2004 1.2 km sprint and 50 km freestyle, 2005 2 × 10 km double pursuit, and 2006 10 km freestyle.)

== Olympic career ==
His best finish at the Winter Olympics was 27th in the 50 km event at Turin in 2006. Šperl has a total of eight individual victories at distances up to 15 km since 2002 in FIS races.

== Cross-country skiing results ==
All results are sourced from the International Ski Federation (FIS).

=== Olympic Games ===
Year	Age	15 km	Pursuit	30 km	50 km	Sprint	4 × 10 km relay	Team sprint
2002	21	45	52	—	49	—	—	—N/a
2006	25	—	35	—N/a	27	—	—	—
2010	29	43	—	—N/a	—	—	—	—

=== World Championships ===
- 1 medal – (1 bronze)

Year	Age	15 km	Pursuit	30 km	50 km	Sprint	4 × 10 km relay	Team sprint
2003	22	40	—	54	—	46	—	—N/a
2005	24	—	59	—N/a	6	—	—	—
2007	26	44	—	—N/a	—	—	8	Bronze
2009	28	—	53	—N/a	32	—	—	—

=== World Cup ===
==== Season standings ====
Season	Age	Discipline standings					Ski Tour standings	
Season	Age	Overall	Distance	Long Distance	Middle Distance	Sprint	Tour de Ski	World Cup Final
2000	20	NC	—N/a	—	NC	—	—N/a	—N/a
2001	21	NC	—N/a	—N/a	—N/a	NC	—N/a	—N/a
2002	22	NC	—N/a	—N/a	—N/a	NC	—N/a	—N/a
2003	23	NC	—N/a	—N/a	—N/a	NC	—N/a	—N/a
2004	24	NC	NC	—N/a	—N/a	NC	—N/a	—N/a
2005	25	106	67	—N/a	—N/a	NC	—N/a	—N/a
2006	26	77	51	—N/a	—N/a	—	—N/a	—N/a
2007	27	73	52	—N/a	—N/a	NC	41	—N/a
2008	28	85	54	—N/a	—N/a	—	—	—
2009	29	151	92	—N/a	—N/a	NC	DNF	45
2010	30	NC	NC	—N/a	—N/a	NC	37	—

==== Team podiums ====
- 1 victory – (1 RL)
- 2 podiums – (2 RL)

No.	Season	Date	Location	Race	Level	Place	Teammates
1	2006–07	19 November 2006	Gällivare, Sweden	4 × 10 km Relay C/F	World Cup	3rd	Bauer / Koukal / Magál
2	2007–08	9 December 2007	Davos, Switzerland	4 × 10 km Relay C/F	World Cup	1st	Jakš / Bauer / Koukal
