= Devon Kershaw =

Canadian retired cross country skier (born 1982)

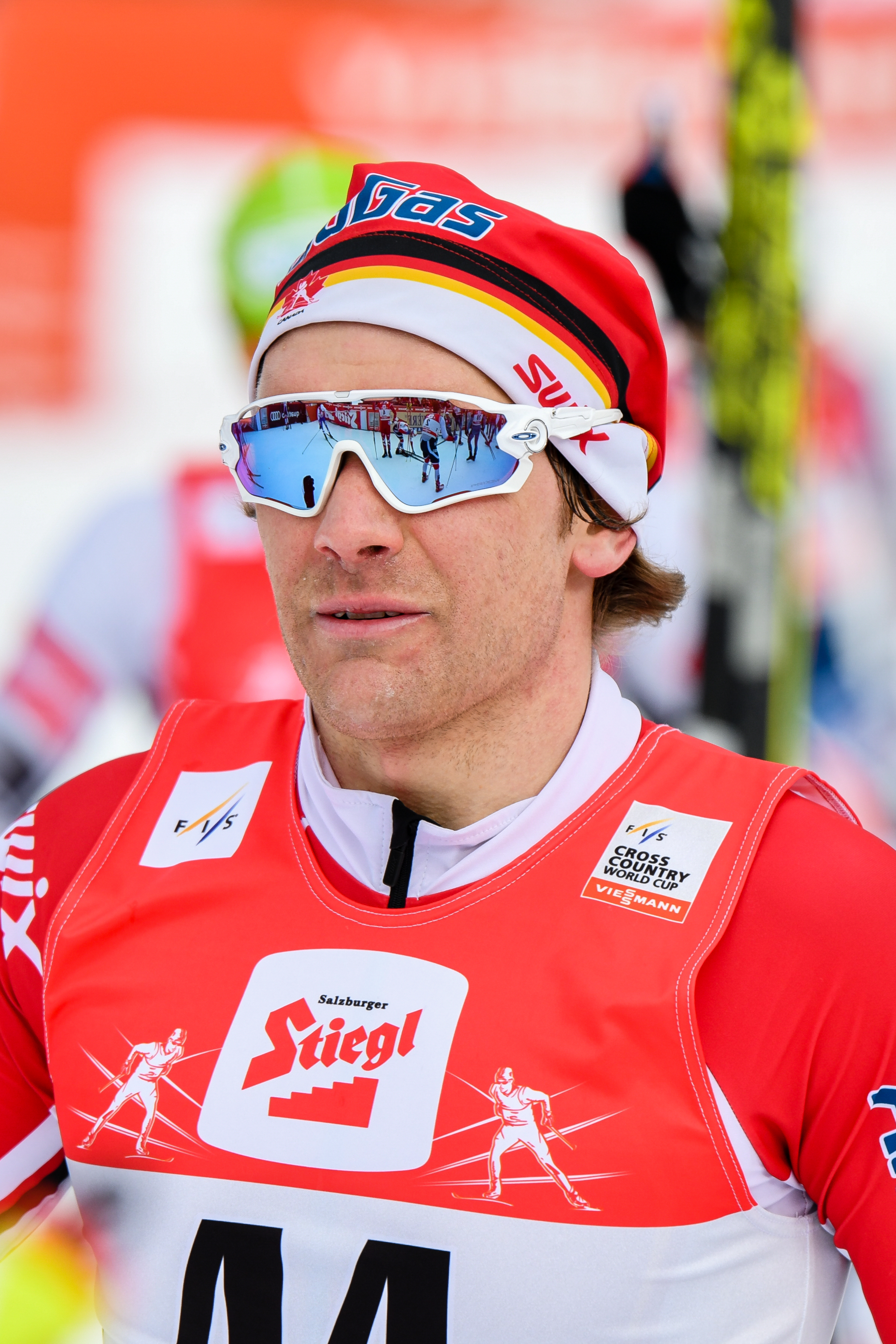

Personal information
- Full name: Luke Devon Kershaw
- Born: 20 December 1982 (age 43) Sudbury, Ontario
- Height: 1.77 m (5 ft 10 in)
- Spouse: Kristin Størmer Steira

Sport
- Sport: Skiing
- Club: Onaping Falls Nordics Ski Club

World Cup career
- Seasons: 15 – (2004–2018)
- Indiv. starts: 290
- Indiv. podiums: 14
- Indiv. wins: 3
- Team starts: 24
- Team podiums: 1
- Team wins: 0
- Overall titles: 0 – (2nd in 2012)
- Discipline titles: 0
Medal record
Men's cross-country skiing
Representing Canada
World Championships
Gold medal – first place	2011 Oslo	Team sprint
U23 World Championships
Bronze medal – third place	2004 Park City	Team sprint
New Zealand Winter Games
Bronze medal – third place	2013 Wanaka	Individual sprint

Devon Kershaw (born December 20, 1982) is a Canadian retired cross-country skier who competed from 2005 to 2018. Growing up in Sudbury, Ontario, Canada, he split his time between several sports before choosing to focus on his cross-country ski career. His career highlights include placing second overall in the World Cup standing in 2011/2012 and claiming the World Champion title in 2011 at the World Ski Championships in Oslo, Norway in the men's team sprint with teammate Alex Harvey.

== Early life and career ==
Kershaw grew up in the Northern Ontario city of Sudbury. His father, Will, and mother, Maureen, were instrumental in developing and nurturing a love of the natural environment and active lifestyle. Kershaw was a serious sports enthusiast growing up, playing hockey, volleyball, badminton, and tennis, and running competitively in his younger years.

Skiing for Laurentian Nordic as a young skier in Sudbury, he participated in three World Junior Championships (2000, 2001, 2002) and won 18 National Junior Medals. As a senior racer he moved west to Canmore, Alberta, home of Canada's National Ski Team, to pursue his athletic dreams and pursuits.

== Athletic career ==
In the 2005 World Championships in Oberstdorf finished 14th in the individual sprint.

He was also the first Canadian male cross country skier to medal in the sprint category – placing third in the Freestyle Sprint in Borlänge, Sweden, on March 7, 2006. In November 2006, he skied his way into the history books again by placing a best finish for a Canadian male in more than 10 years in a World Cup event – 2nd in the Men's 15 kilometre classic race in Saariselkae, Finland.

During the first Tour de Ski in 2006–2007, Kershaw came 2nd in the first Stage – the Freestyle Sprint. Unfortunately, Kershaw became ill and was unable to finish the Tour.

In 2009, Kershaw and the Canadian team finish sixth in the 4 x 10 km relay in the Liberec World Championships, the highest placing ever for the Canadian Team.

In the Vancouver 2010 Winter Olympics, Kershaw's best individual finish was fifth in the 50 km event, and fourth in the team sprint with teammate Alex Harvey. This is the best placing ever for Canadian men in an Olympic cross-country competition.

In the 2011 tour de ski, Kershaw came in first in one of the sprint stages, beating Dario Cologna, and Petter Northug. In the Oslo 2011 World Championship Kershaw and Harvey won the gold medal in the team sprint, bringing Canada their first ever gold and second World Championship medal ever, the first being Sara Renner's bronze in 2005.

In the 2012 Tour de Ski, Kershaw came in fourth place overall, the best a Canadian has ever done.

Kershaw had his best ever season in 2011/2012, finishing second overall in the World Cup standings. He was on the podium in six world cup podiums with two gold, one silver, and three bronze.

== Cross-country skiing results ==
All results are sourced from the International Ski Federation (FIS).

=== Olympic Games ===
Year	Age	15 km individual	30 km skiathlon	50 km mass start	Sprint	4 × 10 km relay	Team sprint
2006	24	47	—	—	37	11	11
2010	28	—	16	5	23	7	4
2014	32	35	—	—	56	—	12
2018	36	71	36	26	—	—	—

=== World Championships ===
- 1 medal – (1 gold)

Year	Age	15 km	Pursuit	30 km	50 km	Sprint	4 × 10 km relay	Team sprint
2003	21	62	55	—	—	50	—	—N/a
2005	23	—	61	—N/a	—	14	13	6
2007	25	68	—	—N/a	—	38	11	6
2009	27	37	27	—N/a	—	—	5	9
2011	29	—	9	—N/a	—	31	—	Gold
2013	31	33	DNS	—N/a	—	46	12	4
2017	35	35	DNS	—N/a	38	—	12	—

=== World Cup ===
==== Season standings ====
Season	Age	Discipline standings			Ski Tour standings			
Season	Age	Overall	Distance	Sprint	Nordic Opening	Tour de Ski	World Cup Final	Ski Tour Canada
2004	22	NC	NC	NC	—N/a	—N/a	—N/a	—N/a
2005	23	97	NC	48	—N/a	—N/a	—N/a	—N/a
2006	24	57	88	25	—N/a	—N/a	—N/a	—N/a
2007	25	96	60	83	—N/a	DNF	—N/a	—N/a
2008	26	38	37	30	—N/a	DNF	23	—N/a
2009	27	18	14	34	—N/a	20	20	—N/a
2010	28	40	39	54	—N/a	16	31	—N/a
2011	29	8	12	18	10	7	27	—N/a
2012	30	2nd place, silver medalist(s)	2nd place, silver medalist(s)	7	20	4	2nd place, silver medalist(s)	—N/a
2013	31	27	41	21	22	12	31	—N/a
2014	32	43	29	60	65	DNF	12	—N/a
2015	33	93	58	75	41	34	—N/a	—N/a
2016	34	35	29	NC	23	32	—N/a	16
2017	35	61	48	NC	27	25	26	—N/a
2018	36	74	48	NC	29	DNF	28	—N/a

==== Individual podiums ====
- 3 victories – (2 WC, 1 SWC)
- 14 podiums – (6 WC, 8 SWC)

No.	Season	Date	Location	Race	Level	Place
1	2005–06	7 March 2006	Borlänge, Sweden	1.5 km Sprint F	World Cup	3rd
2	2006–07	31 December 2006	Munich, Germany	1.1 km Sprint F	Stage World Cup	2nd
3	2008–09	28 December 2008	Oberhof, Germany	15 km Pursuit C	Stage World Cup	3rd
4	2010–11	1 January 2011	Oberhof, Germany	15 km Pursuit C	Stage World Cup	2nd
5	2010–11	2 January 2011	Oberstdorf, Germany	1.2 km Sprint C	Stage World Cup	2nd
6	2010–11	5 January 2011	Toblach, Italy	1.3 km Sprint F	Stage World Cup	1st
7	2010–11	8 January 2011	Val di Fiemme, Italy	20 km Mass Start C	Stage World Cup	3rd
8	2011–12	22 January 2012	Otepää, Estonia	15 km Individual C	World Cup	3rd
9	2011–12	2 February 2012	Moscow, Russia	1.5 km Sprint F	World Cup	3rd
10	2011–12	4 February 2012	Rybinsk, Russia	15 km Mass Start F	World Cup	1st
11	2011–12	17 February 2012	Szklarska Poręba, Poland	1.6 km Sprint F	World Cup	1st
12	2011–12	16 March 2012	Falun, Sweden	3.3 km Individual F	Stage World Cup	3rd
13	2011–12	14–18 March 2012	(Sweden) World Cup Final	Overall Standings	World Cup	2nd
14	2013–14	28 December 2013	Oberhof, Germany	4.5 km Individual F	Stage World Cup	2nd

==== Team podiums ====
- 1 podium – (1 RL)

No.	Season	Date	Location	Race	Level	Place	Teammates
1	2016–17	22 January 2017	Ulricehamn, Sweden	4 × 7.5 km Relay C/F	World Cup	3rd	Harvey / Johnsgaard / Väljas

== Personal life ==
Kershaw is the eldest of three children, sister Linnaea is a journalism student in Vancouver and brother Sean an Art History student in Montreal.

He is married to Norwegian cross-country skier Kristin Størmer Steira, the two having been together since December 2012 and married since July 2015, and has one daughter, born in 2017.
