= Jiří Magál =

Czech cross-country skier

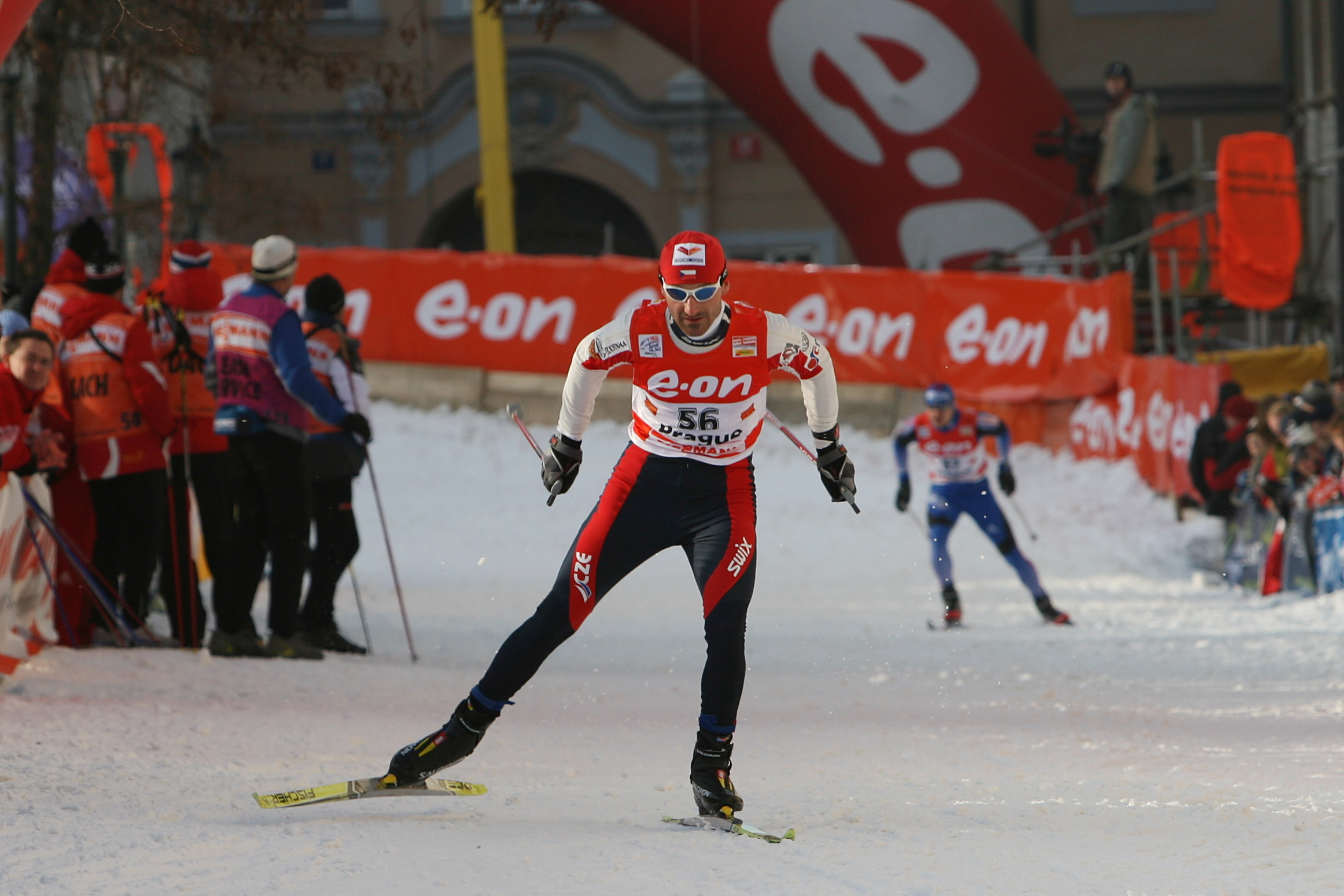
- Jiří Magál in 2007

Personal information
- Nationality: Czech Republic
- Born: 11 April 1977 (age 49) Chrudim, Czechoslovak Socialist Republic

Sport
- Sport: Skiing
- Club: Dukla Liberec

World Cup career
- Seasons: 17 – (1998–2014)
- Indiv. starts: 176
- Indiv. podiums: 0
- Team starts: 36
- Team podiums: 3
- Team wins: 0
- Overall titles: 0 – (29th in 2007)
- Discipline titles: 0
Medal record
Men's cross-country skiing
Representing Czech Republic
Olympic Games
Bronze medal – third place	2010 Vancouver	4 × 10 km relay

Jiří Magál (Czech pronunciation: [ˈjɪr̝iː ˈmaɡaːl]; born 11 April 1977 in Chrudim) is a Czech cross-country skier. Magál has appeared in four Winter Olympics and at every World Championship since 1999.

== Career ==
=== World Championship finishes ===
Magál's highest finish in the World Championships was in 2003, where he finished in 7th in the team event.

=== Other events ===
He made his World Cup debut in the 1998 season in a race in Val di Fiemme, Italy. In World Cups, his highest finish is 3rd, which he achieved in the 2007 season in a race in Gaellivare and the 2008 season in a race in Falun. He has also won the 10 km and pursuit races in the 2009 Slavic Cup in his homeland.

== Outside competitions ==
Magál is a sports instructor by profession, and lives in Krnov. In his free time he enjoys travelling, bowling and films.

== Cross-country skiing results ==
All results are sourced from the International Ski Federation (FIS).

=== Olympic Games ===
- 1 medal – (1 bronze)

Year	Age	10 km	15 km	Pursuit	30 km	50 km	Sprint	4 × 10 km relay	Team sprint
1998	20	—	—N/a	—	22	47	—N/a	15	—N/a
2002	24	—N/a	29	—	43	19	—	7	—N/a
2006	28	—N/a	—	14	—N/a	8	—	9	—
2010	32	—N/a	—	38	—N/a	49	—	Bronze	—
2014	36	—N/a	43	—	—N/a	52	—	—	—

=== World Championships ===
Year	Age	10 km	15 km	Pursuit	30 km	50 km	Sprint	4 × 10 km relay	Team sprint
1999	21	60	—N/a	39	37	—	—N/a	8	—N/a
2001	23	—N/a	54	70	—	46	45	—	—N/a
2003	25	—N/a	29	23	31	55	—	7	—N/a
2005	27	—N/a	18	18	—N/a	27	—	8	—
2007	29	—N/a	29	15	—N/a	—	—	8	—
2009	31	—N/a	30	13	—N/a	17	—	11	—
2011	33	—N/a	—	39	—N/a	43	—	8	—
2013	35	—N/a	27	30	—N/a	20	—	11	—

=== World Cup ===
==== Season standings ====
Season	Age	Discipline standings					Ski Tour standings		
Season	Age	Overall	Distance	Long Distance	Middle Distance	Sprint	Nordic Opening	Tour de Ski	World Cup Final
1998	20	88	—N/a	59	—N/a	—	—N/a	—N/a	—N/a
1999	21	NC	—N/a	NC	—N/a	NC	—N/a	—N/a	—N/a
2000	22	NC	—N/a	NC	NC	NC	—N/a	—N/a	—N/a
2001	23	NC	—N/a	—N/a	—N/a	—	—N/a	—N/a	—N/a
2002	24	NC	—N/a	—N/a	—N/a	—	—N/a	—N/a	—N/a
2003	25	NC	—N/a	—N/a	—N/a	NC	—N/a	—N/a	—N/a
2004	26	50	32	—N/a	—N/a	—	—N/a	—N/a	—N/a
2005	27	42	24	—N/a	—N/a	—	—N/a	—N/a	—N/a
2006	28	40	26	—N/a	—N/a	—	—N/a	—N/a	—N/a
2007	29	29	30	—N/a	—N/a	NC	—N/a	13	—N/a
2008	30	93	58	—N/a	—N/a	NC	—N/a	DNF	—
2009	31	75	49	—N/a	—N/a	NC	—N/a	36	26
2010	32	114	70	—N/a	—N/a	NC	—N/a	36	—
2011	33	115	65	—N/a	—N/a	NC	36	—	—
2012	34	94	61	—N/a	—N/a	NC	37	DNF	—
2013	35	102	64	—N/a	—N/a	NC	45	40	—
2014	36	109	65	—N/a	—N/a	NC	44	32	—

==== Team podiums ====
- 3 podiums – (3 RL)

No.	Season	Date	Location	Race	Level	Place	Teammates
1	2006–07	19 November 2006	Gällivare, Sweden	4 × 10 km Relay C/F	World Cup	3rd	Bauer / Koukal / Šperl
2	2007–08	24 February 2008	Falun, Sweden	4 × 10 km Relay C/F	World Cup	3rd	Jakš / Bauer / Koukal
3	2012–13	20 January 2013	La Clusaz, France	4 × 7.5 km Relay C/F	World Cup	3rd	Bauer / Razým / Jakš
