= Alex Harvey (skier) =

Canadian cross-country skier

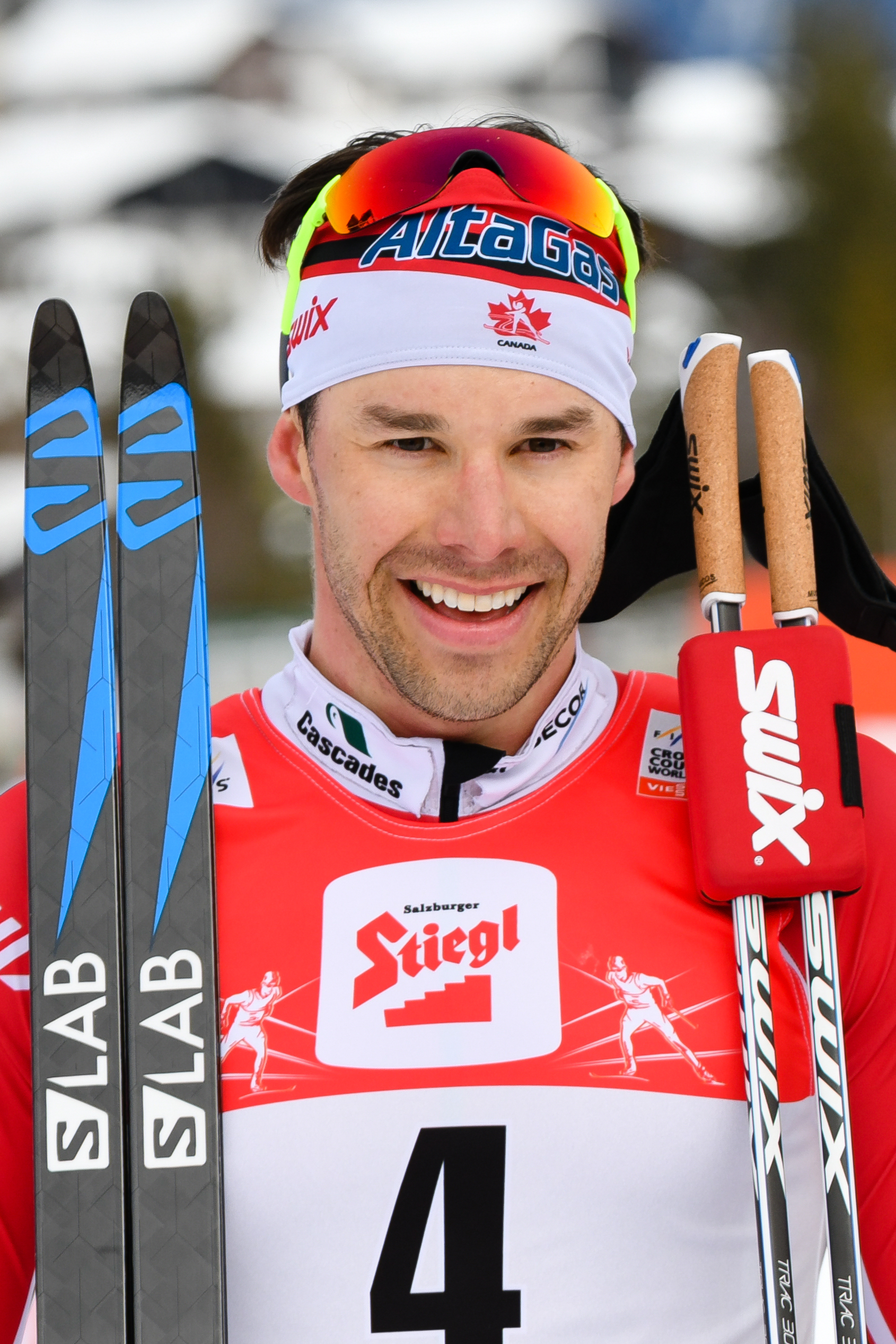
- Harvey in Seefeld 2018

Personal information
- Nationality: Canada
- Born: 7 September 1988 (age 37) Saint-Ferréol-les-Neiges, Quebec, Canada
- Height: 184 cm (6 ft 0 in)

Sport
- Sport: Skiing
- Club: Club Nordique Mont St. Anne

World Cup career
- Seasons: 12 – (2008–2019)
- Indiv. starts: 258
- Indiv. podiums: 30
- Indiv. wins: 8
- Team starts: 11
- Team podiums: 3
- Team wins: 1
- Overall titles: 0 – (3rd in 2014, 2017)
- Discipline titles: 0 – (2nd in DI in 2017)
Medal record
Men's cross-country skiing
Representing Canada
World Championships
Gold medal – first place	2011 Oslo	Team sprint
Gold medal – first place	2017 Lahti	50 km freestyle
Silver medal – second place	2015 Falun	Individual sprint
Bronze medal – third place	2013 Val di Fiemme	Individual sprint
Bronze medal – third place	2015 Falun	30 km skiathlon
Junior World Championships
Gold medal – first place	2011 Otepää	30 km skiathlon
Silver medal – second place	2008 Mals	10 km classical
Bronze medal – third place	2007 Tarvisio	10 km freestyle
Bronze medal – third place	2007 Tarvisio	20 km skiathlon

Alex Harvey (French pronunciation: [alɛks aʁˈve]; born 7 September 1988) is a retired Canadian cross-country skier who competed between 2005 and 2019. Harvey is also a member of the Quebec Provincial Cycling Team.

== Career ==
In 2008 Harvey finished third both in the (Team sprint: Whistler Olympic Park, and the 50 km: Trondheim). He also competed at the FIS Nordic World Ski Championships 2009 in Liberec, finishing fifth in the 4 x 10 km, 22nd in the 15 km + 15 km double pursuit, 28th in the individual sprint, and 36th in the 15 km events.

In the Vancouver 2010 Winter Olympics, Harvey finished fourth in the team sprint with teammate Devon Kershaw. This is the best placing ever for Canadian men in an Olympic cross-country competition. In the men's 4 x 10 km relay, Harvey and Canada finished seventh.

At the 2011 U-23 World Championship, Harvey won the 30 km pursuit race.

At the 30 km pursuit in the 2011 World Championships in Oslo, Norway, Harvey took the lead early on in the freestyle portion of the race, but lost the lead with 2 km to go finishing at 13th place. Three days later, he won gold medal in the team sprint together with Devon Kershaw. At the men's 50 km freestyle Harvey finished fifth, after falling in the Feed Zone after 3 kilometres. He then won a silver medal at the 2011–12 Tour de Ski in Val di Fiemme, Italy, in stage 8 at the 20 km classical mass start.

During the 2013–14 Tour de Ski, Harvey achieved three podium finishes (one first place, one second place and one third place), including a win at the 4,5 km classic technique prologue in Oberhof, Germany. He ended the competition in third place of the Tour de Ski sprint standing with 62 pts, getting a bronze medal. Then, he won a bronze medal at the FIS Nordic World Ski Championships 2013 in the individual sprint event, finishing 0,1 seconds behind the winner, Petter Northug.

He finished third overall of the 2013–14 FIS Cross-Country World Cup rankings, achieved six podium finishes (three first places, two second places and one third place), including a win in Oberhof, Szklarska Poręba and at the World Cup Final in Falun. At the 2015 Tour de Ski, he won a silver medal in stage 6 at the 10 km individual classic.

At the FIS Nordic World Ski Championships 2015 in Falun, Sweden, Harvey won a silver medal in the individual sprint classic and a bronze medal in the 15f/15c skiathlon (30K pursuit) events.

He won the gold medal in the 50-kilometre freestyle race at the 2017 cross-country skiing world championships in Lahti, Finland, the first North American to do so since the event began in 1925.

In February 2019, Harvey announced that he was going to retire at the end of the 2019 season.

== Cross-country skiing results ==
All results are sourced from the International Ski Federation (FIS).

=== Olympic Games ===
Year	Age	15 km individual	30 km skiathlon	50 km mass start	Sprint	4 × 10 km relay	Team sprint
2010	21	21	9	32	—	7	4
2014	25	DNF	17	19	19	—	12
2018	29	7	8	4	32	—	8

=== World Championships ===
- 5 medals – (2 gold, 1 silver, 2 bronze)

Year	Age	15 km individual	30 km skiathlon	50 km mass start	Sprint	4 × 10 km relay	Team sprint
2009	20	36	22	—	28	5	—
2011	22	—	12	5	7	—	Gold
2013	24	—	13	28	Bronze	12	4
2015	26	—	Bronze	5	Silver	10	—
2017	28	—	5	Gold	12	12	6
2019	30	—	6	12	16	12	—

=== World Cup ===
==== Season standings ====
Season	Age	Discipline standings			Ski Tour standings			
Season	Age	Overall	Distance	Sprint	Nordic Opening	Tour de Ski	World Cup Final	Ski Tour Canada
2008	20	NC	NC	NC	—N/a	—	—	—N/a
2009	21	25	21	99	—N/a	—	6	—N/a
2010	22	48	31	82	—N/a	22	32	—N/a
2011	23	10	21	10	17	10	11	—N/a
2012	24	6	7	13	11	12	6	—N/a
2013	25	34	23	45	23	DNF	25	—N/a
2014	26	3rd place, bronze medalist(s)	5	8	42	DNF	2nd place, silver medalist(s)	—N/a
2015	27	9	9	13	10	DNF	—N/a	—N/a
2016	28	7	13	18	7	14	—N/a	5
2017	29	3rd place, bronze medalist(s)	2nd place, silver medalist(s)	13	9	7	2nd place, silver medalist(s)	—N/a
2018	30	4	4	25	4	3rd place, bronze medalist(s)	2nd place, silver medalist(s)	—N/a
2019	31	13	12	26	16	DNF	2nd place, silver medalist(s)	—N/a

==== Individual podiums ====
- 8 victories – (2 WC, 6 SWC)
- 30 podiums – (12 WC, 18 SWC)

No.	Season	Date	Location	Race	Level	Place
1	2008–09	14 March 2009	Trondheim, Norway	50 km Mass Start C	World Cup	3rd
2	2010–11	20 February 2011	Drammen, Norway	1.6 km Sprint F	World Cup	2nd
3	2011–12	7 January 2012	Val di Fiemme, Italy	20 km Mass Start C	Stage World Cup	2nd
4	2011–12	3 March 2012	Lahti, Finland	15 km + 15 km Skiathlon C/F	World Cup	3rd
5	2011–12	16 March 2012	Falun, Sweden	3.3 km Individual F	Stage World Cup	1st
6	2011–12	18 March 2012	Falun, Sweden	15 km Pursuit F	Stage World Cup	2nd
7	2012–13	5 January 2013	Val di Fiemme, Italy	15 km Mass Start C	Stage World Cup	3rd
8	2013–14	28 December 2013	Oberhof, Germany	4.5 km Individual F	Stage World Cup	1st
9	2013–14	31 December 2013	Lenzerheide, Switzerland	1.5 km Sprint F	Stage World Cup	2nd
10	2013–14	3 January 2014	Cortina–Toblach, Italy	35 km Pursuit F	Stage World Cup	3rd
11	2013–14	18 January 2014	Szklarska Poręba, Poland	1.5 km Sprint F	World Cup	1st
12	2013–14	15 March 2014	Falun, Sweden	15 km + 15 km Skiathlon C/F	Stage World Cup	1st
13	2013–14	14–16 March 2014	(Sweden) World Cup Final	Overall Standings	World Cup	2nd
14	2014–15	4 January 2015	Oberstdorf, Germany	15 km Pursuit C	Stage World Cup	2nd
15	2014–15	14 February 2015	Östersund, Sweden	1.2 km Sprint C	World Cup	2nd
16	2015–16	28 November 2015	Rukatunturi, Finland	10 km Individual F	Stage World Cup	2nd
17	2015–16	4 March 2016	Quebec City, Canada	1.7 km Sprint F	Stage World Cup	2nd
18	2016–17	4 January 2017	Oberstdorf, Germany	15 km Pursuit F	Stage World Cup	3rd
19	2016–17	21 January 2017	Ulricehamn, Sweden	15 km Individual F	World Cup	1st
20	2016–17	17 March 2017	Quebec City, Canada	1.5 km Sprint F	Stage World Cup	1st
21	2016–17	17–19 March 2017	(Canada) World Cup Final	Overall Standings	World Cup	2nd
22	2017–18	6 January 2018	Val di Fiemme, Italy	15 km Mass Start C	Stage World Cup	3rd
23	2017–18	30 December 2017 – 7 January 2018	(Switzerland) (Germany) (Italy) Tour de Ski	Overall Standings	World Cup	3rd
24	2017–18	28 January 2018	Seefeld, Austria	15 km Mass Start F	World Cup	2nd
25	2017–18	18 March 2018	Falun, Sweden	15 km Pursuit F	Stage World Cup	1st
26	2017–18	16–18 March 2018	(Sweden) World Cup Final	Overall Standings	World Cup	2nd
27	2018–19	30 November 2018	Lillehammer, Norway	1.6 km Sprint F	Stage World Cup	3rd
28	2018–19	23 March 2019	Quebec City, Canada	15 km Mass Start C	Stage World Cup	2nd
29	2018–19	24 March 2019	Quebec City, Canada	15 km Pursuit F	Stage World Cup	1st
30	2018–19	24 March 2019	(Canada) World Cup Final	Overall Standings	World Cup	2nd

==== Team podiums ====
- 1 victory – (1 TS)
- 3 podiums – (1 RL, 2 TS)

No.	Season	Date	Location	Race	Level	Place	Teammate(s)
1	2008–09	18 January 2009	Whistler, Canada	6 × 1.6 km Team Sprint F	World Cup	3rd	Grey
2	2016–17	15 January 2017	Toblach, Italy	6 × 1.3 km Team Sprint F	World Cup	1st	Väljas
3	2016–17	22 January 2017	Ulricehamn, Sweden	4 × 7.5 km Relay C/F	World Cup	3rd	Kershaw / Johnsgaard / Väljas
