= Anders Södergren =

Swedish cross-country skier

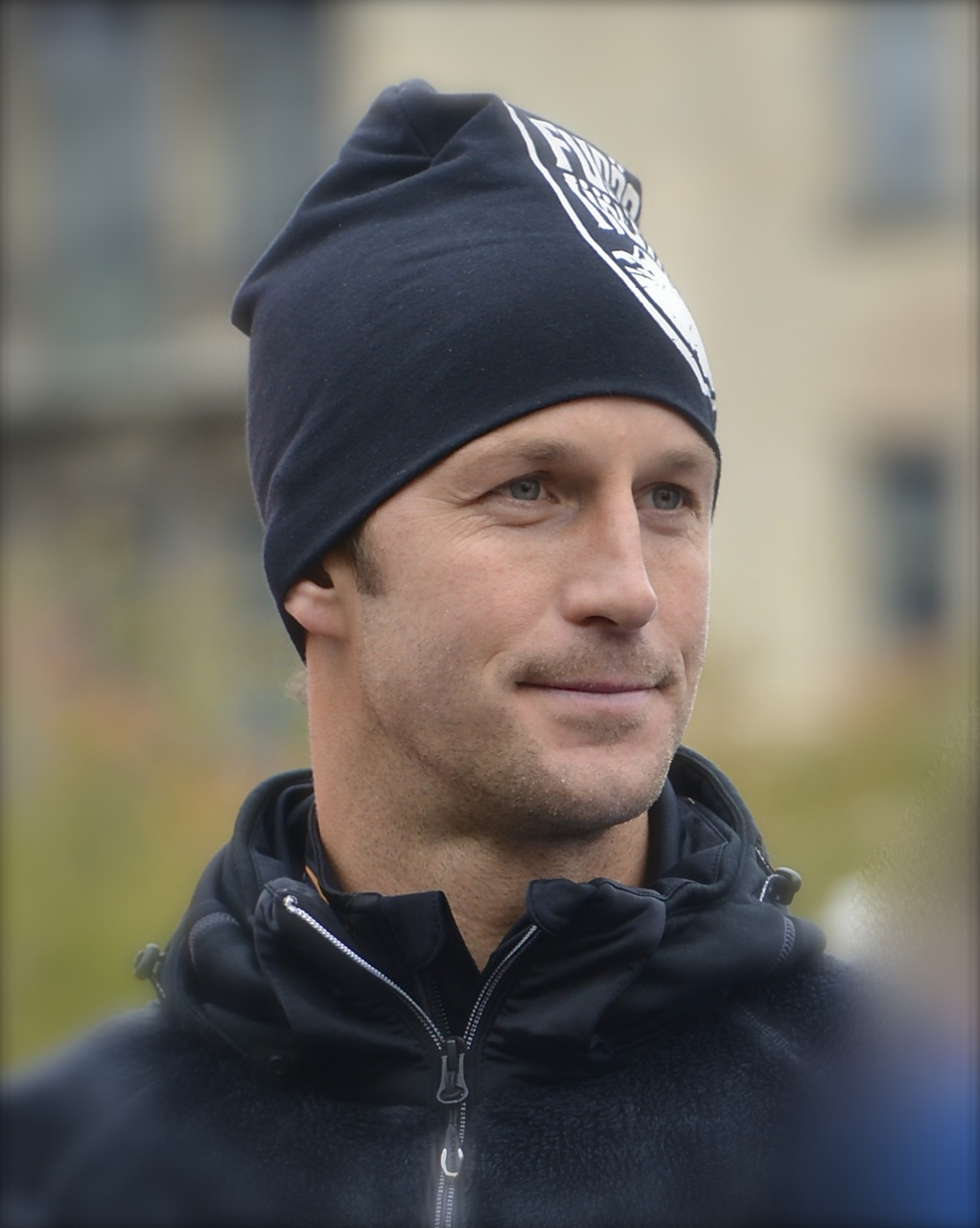
- Anders Södergren in Kungsträdgården in Stockholm, Sweden in October 2014

Personal information
- Full name: Hans Anders Södergren
- Nationality: Sweden
- Born: 17 May 1977 (age 49) Söderhamn, Sweden
- Height: 1.82 m (6 ft 0 in)

Sport
- Sport: Skiing
- Club: Hudiksvalls IF

World Cup career
- Seasons: 17 – (1999–2015)
- Indiv. starts: 164
- Indiv. podiums: 14
- Indiv. wins: 3
- Team starts: 23
- Team podiums: 6
- Team wins: 1
- Overall titles: 0 – (7th in 2008)
- Discipline titles: 0
Medal record
Men's cross-country skiing
Representing Sweden
Event	1st	2nd	3rd
Olympic Games	1	0	1
World Championships	0	3	2
Total	1	3	3
Olympic Games
Gold medal – first place	2010 Vancouver	4 × 10 km relay
Bronze medal – third place	2006 Turin	4 × 10 km relay
World Championships
Silver medal – second place	2003 Val di Fiemme	50 km freestyle
Silver medal – second place	2009 Liberec	30 km double pursuit
Silver medal – second place	2011 Oslo	4 × 10 km relay
Bronze medal – third place	2003 Val di Fiemme	4 × 10 km relay
Bronze medal – third place	2007 Sapporo	4 × 10 km relay

Hans Anders Södergren (born 17 May 1977 in Söderhamn, Hälsingland) is a Swedish cross-country skier who has competed since 1999. He earned a bronze medal in the 4 × 10 km relay at the 2006 Winter Olympics in Turin and also finished 5th in the 15 km + 15 km double pursuit event at those same Olympics. In the 2010 Winter Olympics in Vancouver he won a gold medal with the Swedish team in the 4 × 10 km relay.

Södergren won four medals at the FIS Nordic World Ski Championships with two silvers (15 km + 15 km double pursuit: 2009, 50 km: 2003) and two bronzes in the 4 × 10 km relay (2003, 2007). He has eight FIS Race victories and is a ten-time national champion at distances between 15 km and 50 km as of the 2005–06 season.

Södergren won the 50 km event at both the 2006 and the 2008 Holmenkollen ski festival, making him the only skier to have won an international 50 km elite race with individual start in free technique since 2004.

Södergren has a twin brother, Pär, who was forced to abandon his cross-country skiing career following a back injury.

== Cross-country skiing results ==
All results are sourced from the International Ski Federation (FIS).

=== Olympic Games ===
- 2 medals – (1 gold, 1 bronze)

Year	Age	15 km individual	30 km skiathlon	50 km mass start	Sprint	4 × 10 km relay	Team sprint
2006	28	10	5	6	—	Bronze	—
2010	32	25	10	9	—	Gold	—
2014	36	—	13	7	—	—	—

=== World Championships ===
- 5 medals – (3 silver, 2 bronze)

Year	Age	15 km	Pursuit	30 km	50 km	Sprint	4 × 10 km relay	Team sprint
2001	23	—	—	15	15	—	—	—N/a
2003	25	—	15	11	Silver	—	Bronze	—N/a
2005	27	15	5	—N/a	9	—	7	—
2007	29	10	8	—N/a	14	—	Bronze	—
2009	31	18	Silver	—N/a	DNS	—	—	—
2011	33	22	20	—N/a	14	—	Silver	—
2013	35	—	19	—N/a	15	—	—	—
2015	37	—	—	—N/a	15	—	—	—

=== World Cup ===
==== Season standings ====
Season	Age	Discipline standings					Ski Tour standings		
Season	Age	Overall	Distance	Long Distance	Middle Distance	Sprint	Nordic Opening	Tour de Ski	World Cup Final
1999	21	NC	—N/a	NC	—N/a	—	—N/a	—N/a	—N/a
2000	22	100	—N/a	66	NC	71	—N/a	—N/a	—N/a
2001	23	125	—N/a	—N/a	—N/a	—	—N/a	—N/a	—N/a
2002	24	43	—N/a	—N/a	—N/a	63	—N/a	—N/a	—N/a
2003	25	16	—N/a	—N/a	—N/a	—	—N/a	—N/a	—N/a
2004	26	10	8	—N/a	—N/a	NC	—N/a	—N/a	—N/a
2005	27	24	13	—N/a	—N/a	—	—N/a	—N/a	—N/a
2006	28	8	3rd place, bronze medalist(s)	—N/a	—N/a	—	—N/a	—N/a	—N/a
2007	29	15	8	—N/a	—N/a	NC	—N/a	16	—N/a
2008	30	7	5	—N/a	—N/a	42	—N/a	16	25
2009	31	37	22	—N/a	—N/a	NC	—N/a	DNF	—
2010	32	32	26	—N/a	—N/a	NC	—N/a	—	6
2011	33	39	26	—N/a	—N/a	NC	20	DNF	23
2012	34	54	32	—N/a	—N/a	NC	57	—	—
2013	35	81	52	—N/a	—N/a	NC	37	—	—
2014	36	119	71	—N/a	—N/a	NC	—	DNF	—
2015	37	118	69	—N/a	—N/a	NC	65	—	—

==== Individual podiums ====
- 3 victories – (3 WC)
- 14 podiums – (14 WC)

No.	Season	Date	Location	Race	Level	Place
1	2002–03	21 December 2002	Ramsau, Austria	5 km + 5 km Pursuit C/F	World Cup	2nd
2	2003–04	28 November 2003	Rukatunturi, Finland	15 km Individual C	World Cup	3rd
3	2003–04	30 November 2003	Rukatunturi, Finland	7.5 km + 7.5 km Pursuit C/F	World Cup	2nd
4	2003–04	13 December 2003	Davos, Switzerland	15 km Individual C	World Cup	3rd
5	2003–04	18 December 2003	Ramsau, Austria	7.5 km + 7.5 km Pursuit C/F	World Cup	3rd
6	2004–05	18 December 2004	Ramsau, Austria	30 km Mass Start F	World Cup	2nd
7	2005–06	21 January 2006	Oberstdorf, Germany	7.5 km + 7.5 km Pursuit C/F	World Cup	2nd
8	2005–06	11 March 2006	Oslo, Norway	50 km Individual F	World Cup	1st
9	2005–06	19 March 2006	Sapporo, Japan	7.5 km + 7.5 km Pursuit C/F	World Cup	3rd
10	2006–07	26 November 2006	Rukatunturi, Finland	15 km Individual C	World Cup	3rd
11	2007–08	24 November 2007	Beitostølen, Norway	15 km Individual F	World Cup	3rd
12	2007–08	23 February 2008	Falun, Sweden	15 km + 15 km Pursuit C/F	World Cup	3rd
13	2007–08	8 March 2008	Oslo, Norway	50 km Individual F	World Cup	1st
14	2008–09	14 February 2009	Valdidentro, Italy	15 km Individual C	World Cup	1st

==== Team podiums ====
- 1 victory – (1 RL)
- 6 podiums – (6 RL)

No.	Season	Date	Location	Race	Level	Place	Teammates
1	2001–02	10 March 2002	Falun, Sweden	4 × 10 km Relay C/F	World Cup	2nd	M. Fredriksson / Elofsson / Östberg
2	2002–03	23 March 2003	Falun, Sweden	4 × 10 km Relay C/F	World Cup	1st	Carlsson / M. Fredriksson / Brink
3	2004–05	20 March 2005	Falun, Sweden	4 × 10 km Relay C/F	World Cup	3rd	T. Fredriksson / Karlsson / M. Fredriksson
4	2007–08	9 December 2007	Davos, Switzerland	4 × 10 km Relay C/F	World Cup	3rd	Larsson / Olsson / Hellner
5	2008–09	7 December 2008	La Clusaz, France	4 × 10 km Relay C/F	World Cup	2nd	Rickardsson / Olsson / Hellner
6	2011–12	12 February 2012	Nové Město, Czech Republic	4 × 10 km Relay C/F	World Cup	3rd	Rickardsson / Olsson / Hellner

Olympic Games
Preceded by Peter Forsberg	Flagbearer for Sweden; Sochi 2014	Succeeded by Niklas Edin
