= Martin Bajčičák =

Slovak ski runner and Olympic athlete (born 1976)

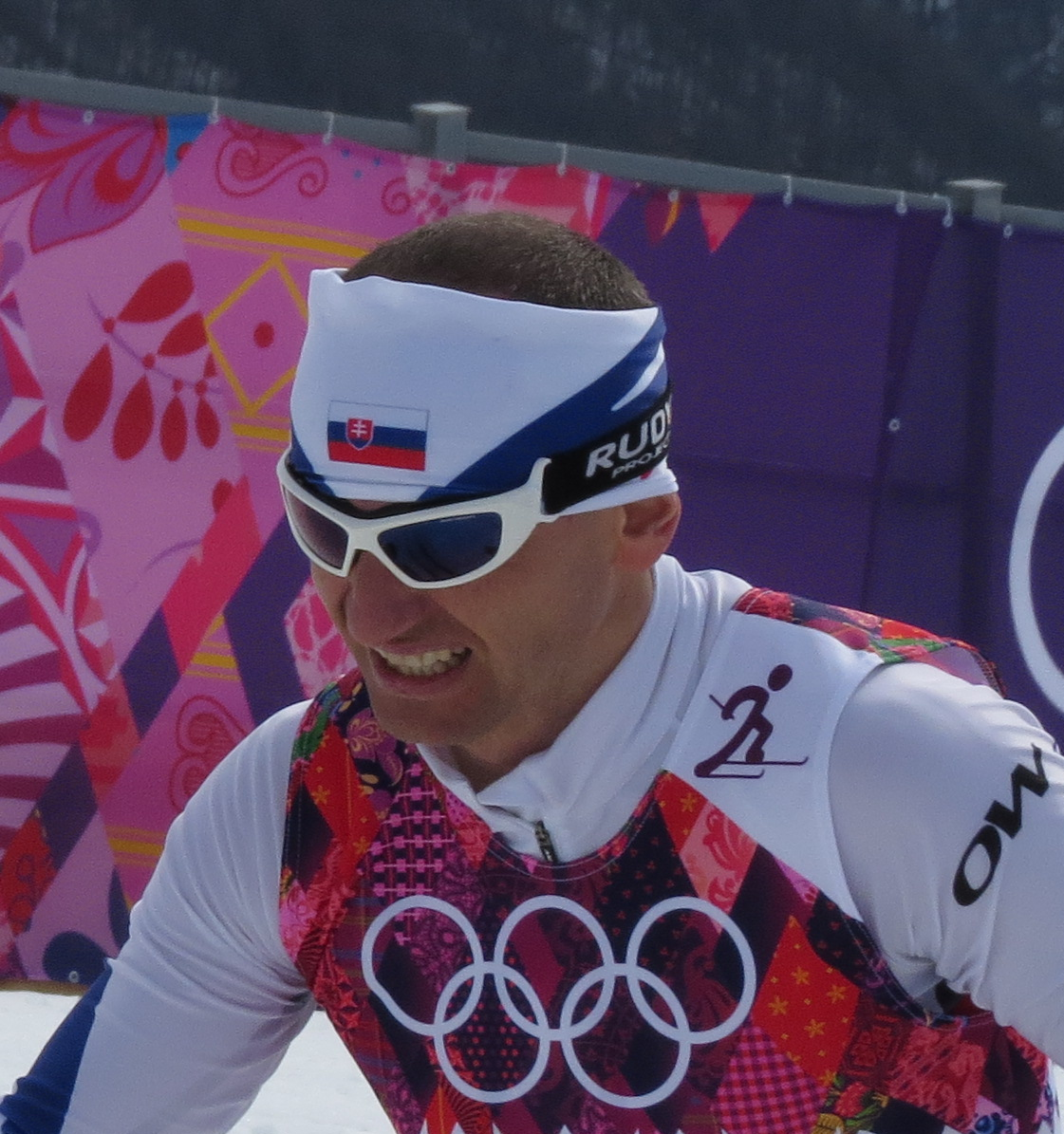
- Bajčičák in 2014

Personal information
- Nationality: Slovakia
- Born: 12 June 1976 (age 50) Dolný Kubín, Czechoslovakia

Sport
- Sport: Skiing
- Club: SKP Štrbské Pleso

World Cup career
- Seasons: 20 – (1996–2015)
- Indiv. starts: 211
- Indiv. podiums: 3
- Indiv. wins: 1
- Team starts: 30
- Team podiums: 0
- Overall titles: 0 – (16th in 2005)
- Discipline titles: 0
Medal record
Men's cross-country skiing
Representing Slovakia
Junior World Championships
Silver medal – second place	1996 Asiago	10 km classical
Bronze medal – third place	1996 Asiago	30 km freestyle
Winter Universiade
Gold medal – first place	1997 Muju-Chonju	4 × 10 km relay
Gold medal – first place	1999 Poprad-Tatry	4 × 10 km relay
European Youth Olympic Winter Festival
Bronze medal – third place	1993 Aosta	7.5 km classical

Martin Bajčičák (born 12 June 1976 in Dolný Kubín) is a Slovak cross-country skier who has been competing since 1994. His best finish at the FIS Nordic World Ski Championships was fourth in the 15 km + 15 km double pursuit in 2005.

Bajčičák's best finish at the Winter Olympics was also in the 15 km + 15 km double pursuit, though it was eighth in 2006.

His only individual World Cup victory came in 15 km event in Germany in 2005. Bajčičák also has seven FIS race victories up to the 15 km + 15 km double pursuit distance from 2000 to 2006.

== Cross-country skiing results ==
All results are sourced from the International Ski Federation (FIS).

=== Olympic Games ===
Year	Age	10 km	15 km	Pursuit	30 km	50 km	Sprint	4 × 10 km relay	Team sprint
1998	21	67	—N/a	38	28	DNF	—N/a	11	—N/a
2002	25	—N/a	24	50	32	12	—	—	—N/a
2006	29	—N/a	28	8	—N/a	14	—	—	8
2010	33	—N/a	23	25	—N/a	DNF	—	12	—
2014	37	—N/a	23	30	—N/a	14	—	—	17

=== World Championships ===
Year	Age	10 km	15 km	Pursuit	30 km	50 km	Sprint	4 × 10 km relay	Team sprint
1997	20	57	—N/a	50	—	—	—N/a	9	—N/a
1999	22	48	—N/a	28	22	35	—N/a	11	—N/a
2001	24	—N/a	DNF	42	—	20	—	10	—N/a
2003	26	—N/a	—	40	24	33	—	—	—N/a
2005	28	—N/a	10	4	—N/a	24	—	—	—
2007	30	—N/a	72	18	—N/a	6	—	—	—
2009	32	—N/a	10	15	—N/a	21	—	—	15
2011	34	—N/a	19	26	—N/a	25	—	—	—
2013	36	—N/a	38	37	—N/a	34	—	—	20
2015	38	—N/a	46	38	—N/a	37	—	—	—

=== World Cup ===
==== Season standings ====
Season	Age	Discipline standings					Ski Tour standings		
Season	Age	Overall	Distance	Long Distance	Middle Distance	Sprint	Nordic Opening	Tour de Ski	World Cup Final
1996	19	NC	—N/a	—N/a	—N/a	—N/a	—N/a	—N/a	—N/a
1997	20	98	—N/a	NC	—N/a	74	—N/a	—N/a	—N/a
1998	21	76	—N/a	NC	—N/a	63	—N/a	—N/a	—N/a
1999	22	54	—N/a	57	—N/a	71	—N/a	—N/a	—N/a
2000	23	53	—N/a	NC	31	NC	—N/a	—N/a	—N/a
2001	24	62	—N/a	—N/a	—N/a	NC	—N/a	—N/a	—N/a
2002	25	76	—N/a	—N/a	—N/a	—	—N/a	—N/a	—N/a
2003	26	72	—N/a	—N/a	—N/a	—	—N/a	—N/a	—N/a
2004	27	42	26	—N/a	—N/a	NC	—N/a	—N/a	—N/a
2005	28	16	11	—N/a	—N/a	NC	—N/a	—N/a	—N/a
2006	29	63	41	—N/a	—N/a	—	—N/a	—N/a	—N/a
2007	30	62	37	—N/a	—N/a	NC	—N/a	34	—N/a
2008	31	35	20	—N/a	—N/a	100	—N/a	25	16
2009	32	97	71	—N/a	—N/a	NC	—N/a	DNF	24
2010	33	56	30	—N/a	—N/a	—	—N/a	—	—
2011	34	100	59	—N/a	—N/a	NC	39	—	—
2012	35	88	55	—N/a	—N/a	NC	59	40	—
2013	36	124	79	—N/a	—N/a	NC	53	—	—
2014	37	124	76	—N/a	—N/a	NC	80	38	—
2015	38	NC	NC	—N/a	—N/a	NC	—	44	—N/a

==== Individual podiums ====
- 1 victory – (1 WC)
- 3 podiums – (2 WC, 1 SWC)

No.	Season	Date	Location	Place	Level	Place
1	2004–05	12 February 2005	Reit im Winkl, Germany	15 km Individual F	World Cup	1st
2	2004–05	19 March 2005	Falun, Sweden	30 km Skiathlon C/F	World Cup	3rd
3	2007–08	6 January 2008	Val di Fiemme, Italy	10 km Pursuit F	Stage World Cup	3rd
