= FIS Nordic World Ski Championships 2009 – Men's 30 kilometre pursuit =

Men's 30 kilometre pursuit at the FIS Nordic World Ski Championships 2009
- Venue: Liberec
- Date: 22 February 2009
- Competitors: 93 from 41 nations
- Winning time: 1:15:52.4

Medalists
gold medal	Petter Northug	Norway
silver medal	Anders Södergren	Sweden
bronze medal	Giorgio Di Centa	Italy

The men's 30 kilometre pursuit (15 km classical + 15 km freestyle) at the FIS Nordic World Ski Championships 2009 took place on 22 February 2009 at 13:00 CET at Liberec.

== Results ==
Rank	Bib	Athlete	Country	Time	Deficit
1st place, gold medalist(s)	6	Petter Northug	Norway	1:15:52.4	—
2nd place, silver medalist(s)	16	Anders Södergren	Sweden	1:15:55.5	+3.1
3rd place, bronze medalist(s)	12	Giorgio Di Centa	Italy	1:16:04.3	+11.9
4	11	Alexander Legkov	Russia	1:16:12.5	+20.1
5	27	Roland Clara	Italy	1:16:16.0	+23.6
6	9	Vincent Vittoz	France	1:16:21.6	+29.2
7	14	Tobias Angerer	Germany	1:16:22.2	+29.8
8	8	Sami Jauhojärvi	Finland	1:16:24.8	+32.4
9	39	Martin Koukal	Czech Republic	1:16:25.1	+32.7
10	19	Jens Filbrich	Germany	1:16:27.8	+35.4
11	15	Matti Heikkinen	Finland	1:16:27.9	+35.5
12	38	Sergey Cherepanov	Kazakhstan	1:16:28.4	+36.0
13	34	Jiri Magal	Czech Republic	1:16:28.9	+36.5
14	24	Tord Asle Gjerdalen	Norway	1:16:30.7	+38.3
15	42	Martin Bajcicak	Slovakia	1:16:30.9	+38.5
16	5	Johan Olsson	Sweden	1:16:32.1	+39.7
17	40	Mathias Fredriksson	Sweden	1:16:33.9	+41.5
18	32	Ville Nousiainen	Finland	1:16:34.1	+41.7
19	17	Andrus Veerpalu	Estonia	1:16:34.6	+42.2
20	23	Marcus Hellner	Sweden	1:16:34.6	+42.2
21	28	Valerio Checchi	Italy	1:16:37.9	+45.5
22	46	Alex Harvey	Canada	1:16:39.2	+46.8
23	25	Nikolay Chebotko	Kazakhstan	1:16:47.2	+54.8
24	30	Maxim Vylegzhanin	Russia	1:16:51.3	+58.9
25	4	Lukas Bauer	Czech Republic	1:16:55.8	+1:03.4
26	33	Sergei Dolidovich	Belarus	1:16:57.6	+1:05.2
27	13	Devon Kershaw	Canada	1:17:14.7	+1:22.3
28	10	Eldar Rønning	Norway	1:17:19.2	+1:26.8
29	21	Aivar Rehemaa	Estonia	1:17:24.3	+1:31.9
30	2	Axel Teichmann	Germany	1:17:24.4	+1:32.0
31	31	René Sommerfeldt	Germany	1:17:24.5	+1:32.1
32	3	Pietro Piller Cottrer	Italy	1:17:35.3	+1:42.9
33	57	James Southam	United States	1:17:36.6	+1:44.2
34	35	Tore Ruud Hofstad	Norway	1:17:55.7	+2:03.3
35	50	Alexander Lasutkin	Belarus	1:18:16.4	+2:24.0
36	49	Roman Leybyuk	Ukraine	1:18:28.7	+2:36.3
37	18	Jaak Mae	Estonia	1:18:28.7	+2:36.3
38	26	Toni Livers	Switzerland	1:18:32.6	+2:40.2
39	22	Tom Reichelt	Germany	1:18:43.2	+2:50.8
40	20	Ivan Babikov	Canada	1:18:56.7	+3:04.3
41	1	Dario Cologna	Switzerland	1:19:34.3	+3:41.9
42	59	Ben Sim	Australia	1:19:56.2	+4:03.8
43	53	Shohei Honda	Japan	1:19:57.5	+4:05.1
44	52	Chris Butler	Canada	1:20:01.6	+4:09.2
45	62	Andrew Musgrave	United Kingdom	1:20:03.8	+4:11.4
46	43	Sergey Novikov	Russia	1:20:16.3	+4:23.9
47	41	Maurice Manificat	France	1:20:16.6	+4:24.2
48	36	Remo Fischer	Switzerland	1:20:25.4	+4:33.0
49	44	Alexey Poltoranin	Kazakhstan	1:20:48.9	+4:56.5
50	51	Aleksandr Ossipov	Kazakhstan	1:20:57.9	+5:05.5
51	29	Emmanuel Jonnier	France	1:21:15.5	+5:23.1
52	37	Ivan Arteev	Russia	1:21:18.3	+5:25.9
53	45	Milan Sperl	Czech Republic	1:21:28.8	+5:36.4
54	7	Jean Marc Gaillard	France	1:21:49.6	+5:57.2
55	60	Paul Constantin Pepene	Romania	1:22:24.3	+6:31.9
56	63	Mikhail Gumenyak	Ukraine	1:23:37.3	+7:44.9
57	64	Jonas Thor Olsen	Denmark	1:23:41.0	+7:48.6
58	47	Diego Ruiz	Spain	1:24:55.7	+9:03.3
59	61	Francesc Soulie	Andorra	1:25:05.6	+9:13.2
60	55	Vicente Vilarrubla	Spain	LAP	
61	65	Callum Watson	Australia	LAP	
62	66	Arvis Liepiņš	Latvia	LAP	
63	69	Artem Rojin	Kyrgyzstan	LAP	
64	80	Aigars Kalnups	Latvia	LAP	
65	70	Daniel Kuzmin	Israel	LAP	
66	75	Carlos Lannes	Argentina	LAP	
67	77	Sergey Mikayelan	Armenia	LAP	
68	92	Thorsten Langer	Belgium	LAP	
69	67	Chris Darlington	Australia	LAP	
70	76	Stephan Langer	Belgium	LAP	
71	68	Nat Anglem	New Zealand	LAP	
72	78	Georgios Nakas	Greece	LAP	
73	90	Tadevos Poghosyan	Armenia	LAP	
74	72	Andrew Wynd	Australia	LAP	
75	85	Dorjgotov Tumur	Mongolia	LAP	
76	86	Dachhiri Sherpa	Nepal	LAP	
77	93	Noreddine Bentoumi	Algeria	LAP	
78	88	Helio Freitas	Greece	LAP	
79	82	Leandro Ribela	Brazil	LAP	
80	73	Darko Damjanovski	Macedonia	LAP	
81	71	Gjoko Icoski	Macedonia	LAP	
82	89	Cesar Baena	Venezuela	LAP	
—	48	Kaspar Kokk	Estonia	DNF	
—	54	Vitaly Shtun	Ukraine	DNF	
—	56	Veselin Tzinzov	Bulgaria	DNF	
—	58	Leif-Orin Zimmermann	United States	DNF	
—	74	Hovhannes Sargsyan	Armenia	DNF	
—	81	Khurelbaatar Khash-Erdene	Mongolia	DNF	
—	83	Jānis Paipals	Latvia	DNF	
—	84	Danny Silva	Portugal	DNF	
—	87	Philip Boit	Kenya	DNF	
—	91	Roberto Carcelen	Peru	DNF	
—	79	Argam Grigoryan	Armenia	DNS	
