= FIS Nordic World Ski Championships 2005 – Men's 50 kilometre classical =

Men's 50 km classical mass start at the FIS Nordic World Ski Championships 2005
- Venue: Oberstdorf
- Date: 27 February 2005
- Competitors: 72
- Winning time: 2:30:10.1

Medalists
| gold medal | Frode Estil | Norway |
| silver medal | Anders Aukland | Norway |
| bronze medal | Odd-Bjørn Hjelmeset | Norway |

The Men's 50 km classical mass start was part of the FIS Nordic World Ski Championships 2005's events held in Oberstdorf, Germany. The race went underway on 27 February 2005 at 12:30 CET. The defending world champion was Czech Republic's Martin Koukal, then in freestyle and interval start.

== Results ==
| Rank | Bib | Athlete | Country | Time | Deficit |
|---|---|---|---|---|---|
| 1st place, gold medalist(s) | 2 | Frode Estil | Norway | 2:30:10.1 | – |
| 2nd place, silver medalist(s) | 27 | Anders Aukland | Norway | 2:30:10.8 | +0.7 |
| 3rd place, bronze medalist(s) | 9 | Odd-Bjørn Hjelmeset | Norway | 2:30:11.5 | +1.4 |
| 4 | 4 | Andrus Veerpalu | Estonia | 2:30:15.1 | +5.0 |
| 5 | 1 | Mathias Fredriksson | Sweden | 2:30:18.3 | +8.2 |
| 6 | 40 | Milan Šperl | Czech Republic | 2:30:18.6 | +8.5 |
| 7 | 6 | Kristen Skjeldal | Norway | 2:30:18.7 | +8.6 |
| 8 | 11 | Mikhail Botvinov | Austria | 2:30:18.9 | +8.8 |
| 9 | 7 | Anders Södergren | Sweden | 2:30:23.5 | +13.4 |
| 10 | 13 | Andreas Schlütter | Germany | 2:30:26.8 | +16.7 |
| 11 | 3 | Lukáš Bauer | Czech Republic | 2:30:31.5 | +21.4 |
| 12 | 39 | Dmitri Pirogov | Russia | 2:30:35.7 | +25.6 |
| 13 | 25 | Markus Hasler | Liechtenstein | 2:30:37.1 | +27.0 |
| 14 | 32 | Sami Jauhojärvi | Finland | 2:30:38.0 | +27.9 |
| 15 | 33 | Christophe Perrillat | France | 2:30:39.1 | +29.0 |
| 16 | 17 | Valerio Checchi | Italy | 2:30:39.5 | +29.4 |
| 17 | 43 | Diego Ruiz | Spain | 2:30:44.6 | +34.5 |
| 18 | 28 | Martin Tauber | Austria | 2:30:47.0 | +36.9 |
| 19 | 16 | Johan Olsson | Sweden | 2:30:49.0 | +38.9 |
| 20 | 22 | Sergei Dolidovich | Belarus | 2:30:52.3 | +42.2 |
| 21 | 42 | Katsuhito Ebisawa | Japan | 2:30:58.9 | +48.8 |
| 22 | 51 | Shunsuke Komamura | Japan | 2:31:07.4 | +57.3 |
| 23 | 48 | Gerhard Urain | Austria | 2:31:13.0 | +1:02.9 |
| 24 | 12 | Martin Bajčičák | Slovakia | 2:31:15.5 | +1:05.4 |
| 25 | 31 | Tero Similä | Finland | 2:31:16.9 | +1:06.8 |
| 26 | 24 | Alexandre Rousselet | France | 2:31:19.9 | +1:09.8 |
| 27 | 10 | Jiří Magál | Czech Republic | 2:31:20.4 | +1:10.3 |
| 28 | 26 | Cristian Saracco | Italy | 2:31:21.0 | +1:10.9 |
| 29 | 8 | Nikolay Pankratov | Russia | 2:31:23.4 | +1:13.3 |
| 30 | 29 | Lars Carlsson | Sweden | 2:31:24.6 | +1:14.5 |
| 31 | 46 | Dan Roycroft | Canada | 2:31:26.5 | +1:16.4 |
| 32 | 5 | Jaak Mae | Estonia | 2:31:28.8 | +1:18.7 |
| 33 | 52 | Jürgen Pinter | Austria | 2:31:34.7 | +1:24.6 |
| 34 | 59 | Andrey Kondroschev | Kazakhstan | 2:32:13.5 | +2:03.4 |
| 35 | 14 | Fabio Santus | Italy | 2:32:40.8 | +2:30.7 |
| 36 | 15 | Thomas Moriggl | Italy | 2:32:41.8 | +2:31.7 |
| 37 | 20 | Ivan Bátory | Slovakia | 2:34:13.3 | +4:03.2 |
| 38 | 23 | Roman Leybyuk | Ukraine | 2:34:27.6 | +4:17.5 |
| 39 | 21 | Franz Göring | Germany | 2:35:40.2 | +5:30.1 |
| 40 | 64 | Li Geliang | China | 2:36:06.6 | +5:56.5 |
| 41 | 54 | Valery Rodokhlebov | Finland | 2:36:57.1 | +6:47.0 |
| 42 | 47 | Vicente Vilarrubla | Spain | 2:37:22.9 | +7:12.8 |
| 43 | 45 | David Chamberlain | United States | 2:37:37.5 | +7:27.4 |
| 44 | 18 | Artem Norin | Russia | 2:37:46.4 | +7:36.3 |
| 45 | 30 | Andrey Golovko | Kazakhstan | 2:38:40.7 | +8:30.6 |
| 46 | 55 | Aliaksei Ivanou | Belarus | 2:39:44.0 | +9:33.9 |
| 47 | 58 | Vitaly Martsyv | Ukraine | 2:40:51.3 | +10:41.2 |
| 48 | 69 | Ye Tian | China | 2:44:37.5 | +14:27.4 |
| 49 | 67 | Li Zhiguang | China | 2:44:56.3 | +14:46.2 |
| 50 | 56 | Ben Derrick | Australia | 2:48:20.4 | +18:10.3 |
| 51 | 60 | Jonas Thor Olsen | Denmark | 2:49:51.2 | +19:41.1 |
| 52 | 63 | Daniel Kuzmin | Israel | 2:51:37.6 | +21:27.5 |
| | 19 | Olli Ohtonen | Finland | DNF | |
| | 34 | Chris Jeffries | Canada | DNF | |
| | 35 | Petr Michl | Czech Republic | DNF | |
| | 36 | Benoit Chauvet | France | DNF | |
| | 37 | Jean-Marc Gaillard | France | DNF | |
| | 38 | Ivan Alypov | Russia | DNF | |
| | 44 | Dmitry Eremenko | Kazakhstan | DNF | |
| | 49 | Drew Goldsack | Canada | DNF | |
| | 50 | James Southam | United States | DNF | |
| | 53 | Lars Flora | United States | DNF | |
| | 57 | Alexander Lasutkin | Belarus | DNF | |
| | 61 | Martin Bianchi | Argentina | DNF | |
| | 65 | Vladimir Tupytzin | Israel | DNF | |
| | 66 | Han Dawei | China | DNF | |
| | 68 | Alan Eason | United Kingdom | DNF | |
| | 70 | Danny Silva | Portugal | DNF | |
| | 71 | Helio Freitas | Greece | DNF | |
| | 72 | Khürelbaataryn Khash-Erdene | Mongolia | DNF | |
| | 41 | George Grey | Canada | DNS | |
| | 62 | Sebastian Sørensen | Denmark | DNS | |
