= Martin Koukal =

Czech cross-country skier (born 1978)

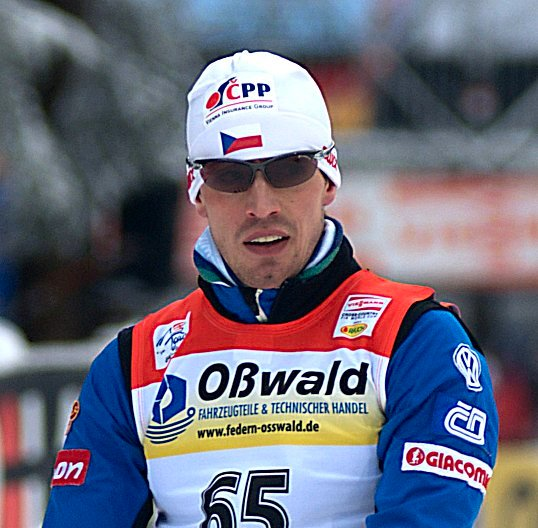
- Martin Koukal in January, 2010

Personal information
- Nationality: Czech Republic
- Born: 25 September 1978 (age 48) Nové Město na Moravě, Czechoslovak Socialist Republic

Sport
- Sport: Skiing
- Club: Dukla Liberec

World Cup career
- Seasons: 1997–2011
- Indiv. starts: 171
- Indiv. podiums: 3
- Indiv. wins: 0
- Team starts: 41
- Team podiums: 4
- Team wins: 1
- Overall titles: 0 – (23rd in 2003)
- Discipline titles: 0
Medal record
Men's cross-country skiing
Representing Czech Republic
Olympic Games
Bronze medal – third place	2010 Vancouver	4 × 10 km relay
World Championships
Gold medal – first place	2003 Val di Fiemme	50 km freestyle
Bronze medal – third place	2005 Oberstdorf	Team sprint
Junior World Championships
Gold medal – first place	1998 Pontresina	4 × 10 km relay
Bronze medal – third place	1997 Canmore	30 km freestyle
Bronze medal – third place	1998 Pontresina	10 km freestyle

Martin Koukal (Czech pronunciation: [ˈmarcɪn ˈkoukal]) (born 25 September 1978 in Nové Město na Moravě) is a Czech cross-country skier and mountaineer who has been competing since 1996. He won two medals at the FIS Nordic World Ski Championships with gold in 50 km (2003) and a bronze in the team sprint (2005). Koukal's best finish at the Winter Olympics was a seventh in the 50 km freestyle mass start in 2006. He also won eight other events in his career from 1998 to 2005 in distances up to 15 km. He has some mountaineering successes, like his Cho Oyu, Huascarán and Kangchenjunga expeditions. His younger brother, Petr, plays ice hockey for HC Pardubice in Czech Extraliga and in 2010 also became world champion of his own.

== Cross-country skiing results ==
All results are sourced from the International Ski Federation (FIS).

=== Olympic Games ===
- 1 medals – (1 bronze)

Year	Age	10 km	15 km	Pursuit	30 km	50 km	Sprint	4 × 10 km relay	Team sprint
1998	19	35	—N/a	37	—	—	—N/a	15	—N/a
2002	23	—N/a	—	44	20	—	10	7	—N/a
2006	27	—N/a	—	21	—N/a	7	15	9	10
2010	31	—N/a	18	DNF	—N/a	—	—	Bronze	6

=== World Championships ===
- 2 medals – (1 gold, 1 bronze)

Year	Age	10 km	15 km	Pursuit	30 km	50 km	Sprint	4 × 10 km relay	Team sprint
1997	18	79	—N/a	37	27	—	—N/a	—	—N/a
1999	20	46	—N/a	23	22		—N/a	8	—N/a
2001	22	—N/a	51	37	—	38	14	14	—N/a
2003	24	—N/a	—	6	—	Gold	5	7	—N/a
2005	26	—N/a	52	27	—N/a	—	—	8	Bronze
2007	28	—N/a	26	DNF	—N/a	21	—	8	—
2009	30	—N/a	—	9	—N/a	7	—	11	—
2011	32	—N/a	—	51	—N/a	23	23	8	—

=== World Cup ===
==== Season standings ====
Season	Age	Discipline standings					Ski Tour standings		
Season	Age	Overall	Distance	Long Distance	Middle Distance	Sprint	Nordic Opening	Tour de Ski	World Cup Final
1997	18	94	—N/a	—	—N/a	—	—N/a	—N/a	—N/a
1998	19	NC	—N/a	NC	—N/a	—	—N/a	—N/a	—N/a
1999	20	31	—N/a	28	—N/a	51	—N/a	—N/a	—N/a
2000	21	50	—N/a	66	52	25	—N/a	—N/a	—N/a
2001	22	52	—N/a	—N/a	—N/a	21	—N/a	—N/a	—N/a
2002	23	41	—N/a	—N/a	—N/a	26	—N/a	—N/a	—N/a
2003	24	23	—N/a	—N/a	—N/a	20	—N/a	—N/a	—N/a
2004	25	48	NC	—N/a	—N/a	16	—N/a	—N/a	—N/a
2005	26	59	50	—N/a	—N/a	31	—N/a	—N/a	—N/a
2006	27	86	69	—N/a	—N/a	60	—N/a	—N/a	—N/a
2007	28	42	22	—N/a	—N/a	NC	—N/a	DNF	—N/a
2008	29	33	38	—N/a	—N/a	48	—N/a	12	34
2009	30	45	36	—N/a	—N/a	NC	—N/a	—	9
2010	31	55	75	—N/a	—N/a	27	—N/a	28	—
2011	32	114	NC	—N/a	—N/a	66	DNF	DNF	—

==== Individual podiums ====
- 3 podiums – (2 WC, 1 SWC)

No.	Season	Date	Location	Race	Level	Place
1	1999–00	28 December 1999	Garmisch-Partenkirchen, Germany	1.0 km Sprint F	World Cup	3rd
2	2003-04	25 October 2003	Düsseldorf, Germany	1.5 km Sprint F	World Cup	2nd
3	2008–09	20 March 2009	Falun, Sweden	3.3 km Individual F	Stage World Cup	3rd

==== Team podiums ====
- 1 victory – (1 RL)
- 4 podiums – (3 RL, 1 TS)

No.	Season	Date	Location	Race	Level	Place	Teammate(s)
1	2001–02	3 March 2002	Lahti, Finland	6 × 1.5 km Team Sprint F	World Cup	3rd	Bauer
2	2006–07	19 November 2006	Gällivare, Sweden	4 × 10 km Relay C/F	World Cup	3rd	Bauer / Magál / Šperl
3	2007–08	9 December 2007	Davos, Switzerland	4 × 10 km Relay C/F	World Cup	1st	Jakš / Bauer / Šperl
4	2007–08	24 February 2008	Falun, Sweden	4 × 10 km Relay C/F	World Cup	3rd	Jakš / Bauer / Magál
