= Martin Bianchi =

Argentine cross-country skier (born 1981)

Personal information
- Born: 11 February 1981 (age 44); Buenos Aires, Argentina

Sport
- Sport: Cross-country skiing

Martin Bianchi (born 11 February 1981) is an Argentine cross-country skier. He competed in the men's 15 kilometre classical event at the 2006 Winter Olympics.
