= FIS Nordic World Ski Championships 2011 – Men's 30 kilometre pursuit =

Men's 30 kilometre pursuit at the FIS Nordic World Ski Championships 2011
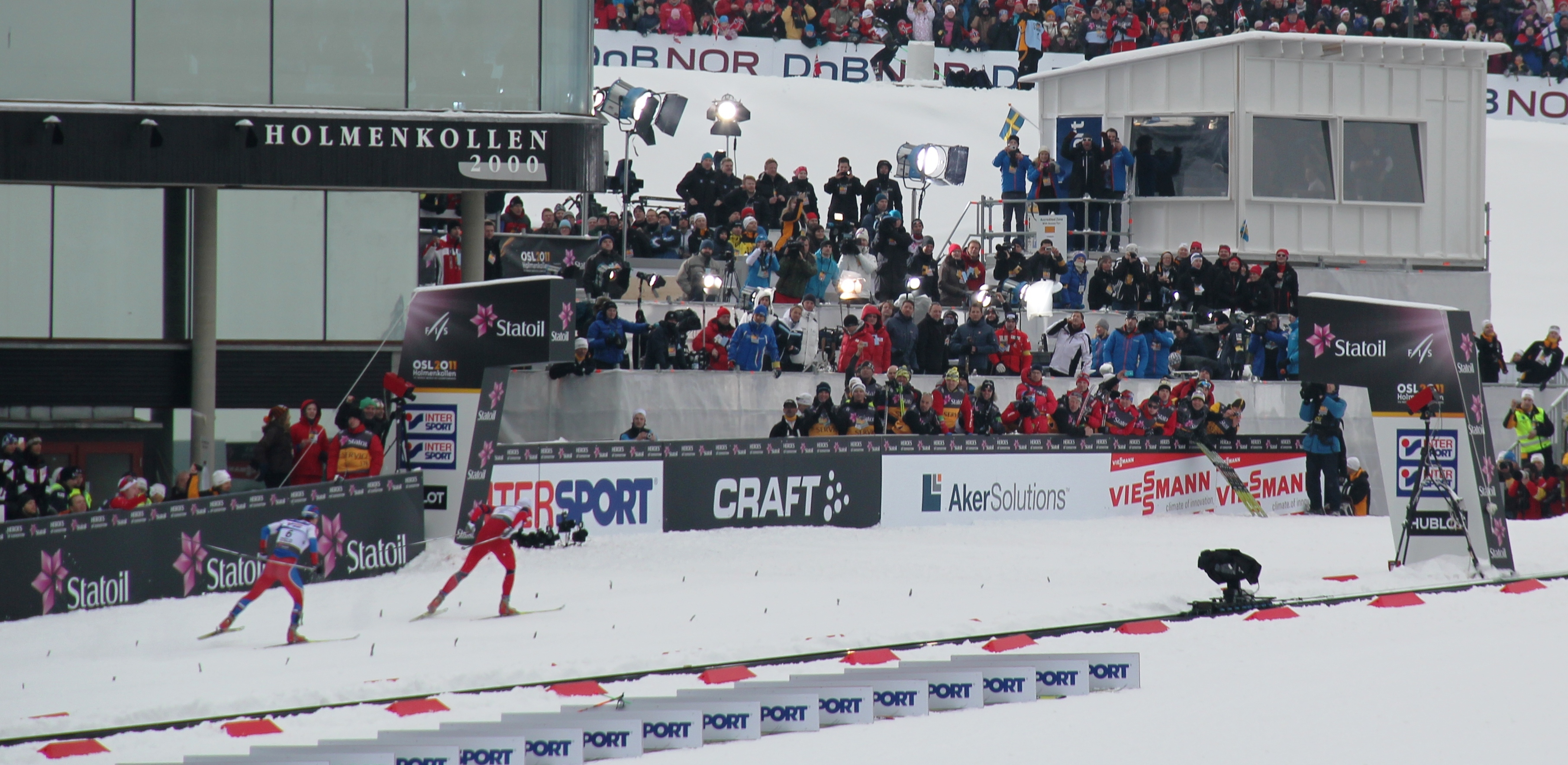
- Petter Northug winning ahead of Maxim Vylegzhanin
- Venue: Holmenkollen National Arena
- Date: 27 February 2011
- Competitors: 83 from 31 nations
- Winning time: 1:14:10.4

Medalists
| gold medal | Petter Northug | Norway |
| silver medal | Maxim Vylegzhanin | Russia |
| bronze medal | Ilia Chernousov | Russia |

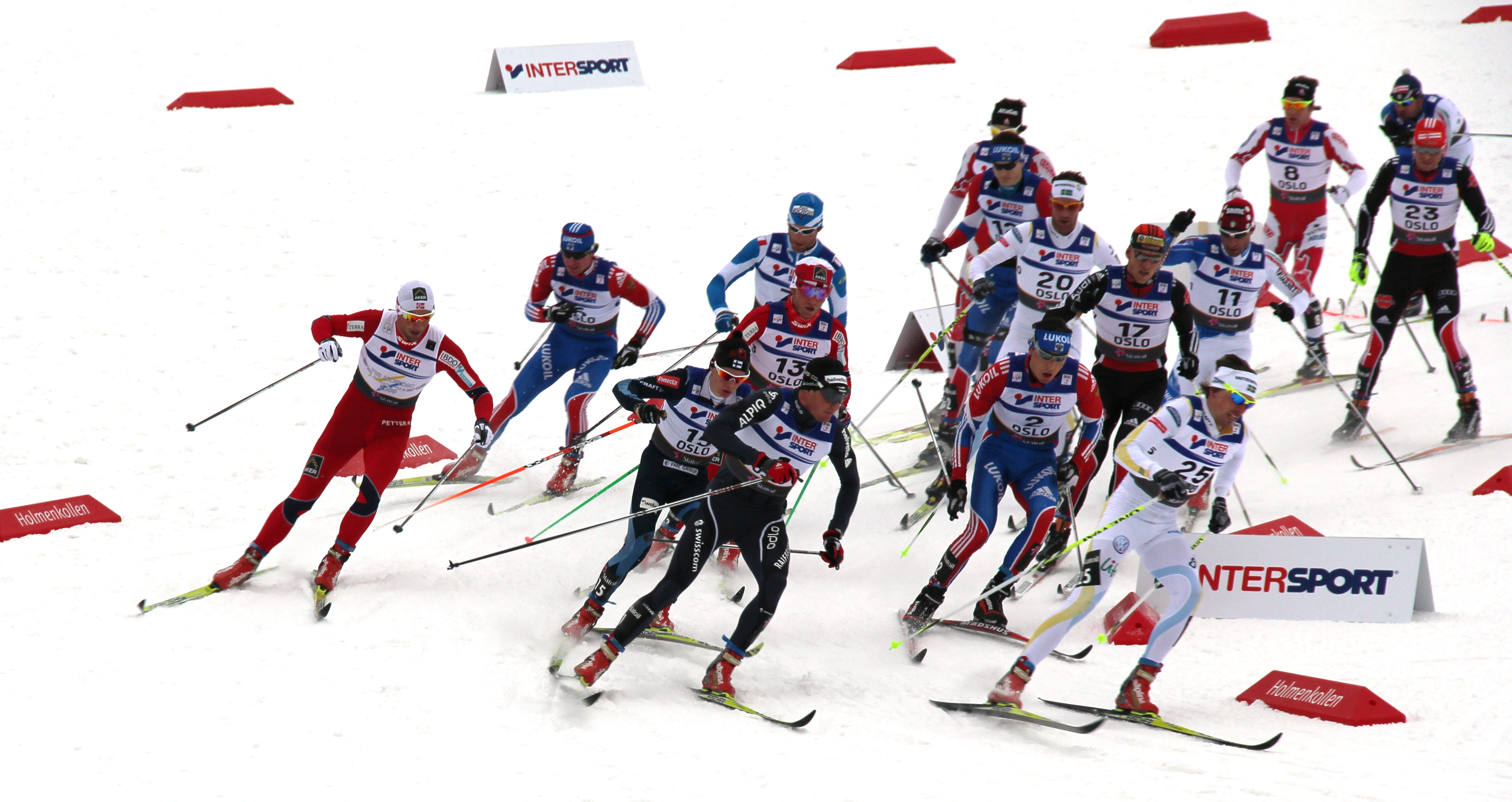
The skiers rounding at Holmenkollen arena at the 30 kilometre pursuit. Defending champion and winner, Petter Northug advancing on the outside left. The other competitors are: #1: Dario Cologna, #2: Alexander Legkov, #6: Maxim Vylegzhanin, #7 (behind #13): Jean-Marc Gaillard, #8: Devon Kershaw, #11: Giorgio di Centa, #12 (behind #20): Petr Sedov, #13: Martin Johnsrud Sundby, #15 Maurice Manificat, #16 (behind #12): Alex Harvey, #17: Jens Filbrich, #20: Anders Södergren, #23: Tobias Angerer, #25: Johan Olsson

The men's 30 kilometre pursuit at the FIS Nordic World Ski Championships 2011 took place on 27 February 2011 at 12:00 CET at Holmenkollen National Arena. The defending world champion was Norway's Petter Northug while the defending Olympic champion was Sweden's Marcus Hellner.

== Results ==
| Rank | Bib | Athlete | Country | Time | Deficit |
|---|---|---|---|---|---|
| 1st place, gold medalist(s) | 4 | Petter Northug | Norway | 1:14:10.4 | |
| 2nd place, silver medalist(s) | 6 | Maxim Vylegzhanin | Russia | 1:14:11.1 | +0.7 |
| 3rd place, bronze medalist(s) | 24 | Ilia Chernousov | Russia | 1:14:11.6 | +1.2 |
| 4 | 38 | Sergei Dolidovich | Belarus | 1:14:13.0 | +2.6 |
| 5 | 13 | Martin Johnsrud Sundby | Norway | 1:14:13.5 | +3.1 |
| 6 | 5 | Marcus Hellner | Sweden | 1:14:13.5 | +3.1 |
| 7 | 10 | Roland Clara | Italy | 1:14:15.8 | +5.4 |
| 8 | 23 | Tobias Angerer | Germany | 1:14:16.9 | +6.5 |
| 9 | 8 | Devon Kershaw | Canada | 1:14:16.9 | +6.5 |
| 10 | 11 | Giorgio Di Centa | Italy | 1:14:19.8 | +9.4 |
| 11 | 36 | Franz Göring | Germany | 1:14:20.5 | +10.1 |
| 12 | 16 | Alex Harvey | Canada | 1:14:20.7 | +10.3 |
| 13 | 26 | Pietro Piller Cottrer | Italy | 1:14:21.0 | +10.6 |
| 14 | 35 | Sjur Røthe | Norway | 1:14:21.2 | +10.8 |
| 15 | 28 | Ivan Babikov | Canada | 1:14:22.2 | +11.8 |
| 16 | 25 | Johan Olsson | Sweden | 1:14:23.0 | +12.6 |
| 17 | 19 | Tord Asle Gjerdalen | Norway | 1:14:23.6 | +13.2 |
| 18 | 15 | Matti Heikkinen | Finland | 1:14:24.2 | +13.8 |
| 19 | 2 | Alexander Legkov | Russia | 1:14:25.9 | +15.5 |
| 20 | 20 | Anders Södergren | Sweden | 1:14:27.6 | +17.2 |
| 21 | 12 | Petr Sedov | Russia | 1:14:31.3 | +20.9 |
| 22 | 14 | Maurice Manificat | France | 1:14:41.2 | +30.8 |
| 23 | 7 | Jean-Marc Gaillard | France | 1:15:03.8 | +53.4 |
| 24 | 1 | Dario Cologna | Switzerland | 1:15:04.6 | +54.2 |
| 25 | 27 | Valerio Checchi | Italy | 1:15:05.2 | +54.8 |
| 26 | 32 | Martin Bajčičák | Slovakia | 1:15:32.6 | +1:22.2 |
| 27 | 3 | Daniel Rickardsson | Sweden | 1:15:40.3 | +1:29.9 |
| 28 | 47 | Tero Similä | Finland | 1:15:50.2 | +1:39.8 |
| 29 | 18 | Kris Freeman | United States | 1:16:20.3 | +2:09.9 |
| 30 | 17 | Jens Filbrich | Germany | 1:16:21.2 | +2:10.8 |
| 31 | 9 | Martin Jakš | Czech Republic | 1:17:04.2 | +2:53.8 |
| 32 | 29 | Christophe Perrillat | France | 1:17:05.5 | +2:55.1 |
| 33 | 33 | Remo Fischer | Switzerland | 1:17:06.1 | +2:55.7 |
| 34 | 22 | Vincent Vittoz | France | 1:17:07.3 | +2:56.9 |
| 35 | 42 | Paul Constantin Pepene | Romania | 1:17:09.6 | +2:59.2 |
| 36 | 21 | Tom Reichelt | Germany | 1:17:11.4 | +3:01.0 |
| 37 | 45 | Noah Hoffman | United States | 1:17:14.1 | +3:03.7 |
| 38 | 49 | Karel Tammjärv | Estonia | 1:17:15.0 | +3:04.6 |
| 39 | 43 | Jiří Magál | Czech Republic | 1:17:17.7 | +3:07.3 |
| 40 | 41 | Jürgen Pinter | Austria | 1:17:36.7 | +3:26.3 |
| 41 | 63 | Eeri Vahtra | Estonia | 1:17:43.4 | +3:33.0 |
| 42 | 31 | Keishin Yoshida | Japan | 1:17:52.2 | +3:41.8 |
| 43 | 39 | Lari Lehtonen | Finland | 1:17:59.9 | +3:49.5 |
| 44 | 51 | Sergey Cherepanov | Kazakhstan | 1:18:00.4 | +3:50.0 |
| 45 | 55 | Kari Varis | Finland | 1:18:13.4 | +4:03.0 |
| 46 | 30 | George Grey | Canada | 1:18:35.1 | +4:24.7 |
| 47 | 59 | Alexander Lasutkin | Belarus | 1:18:46.8 | +4:36.4 |
| 48 | 72 | Yerdos Akhmadiyev | Kazakhstan | 1:18:48.0 | +4:37.6 |
| 49 | 62 | Gennadiy Matviyenko | Kazakhstan | 1:19:03.2 | +4:52.8 |
| 50 | 52 | Petr Novák | Czech Republic | 1:19:27.1 | +5:16.7 |
| 51 | 37 | Martin Koukal | Czech Republic | 1:19:27.4 | +5:17.0 |
| 52 | 56 | Vicenç Vilarrubla | Spain | 1:19:27.6 | +5:17.2 |
| 53 | 40 | Lars Flora | United States | 1:20:02.4 | +5:52.0 |
| 54 | 34 | Toni Livers | Switzerland | 1:20:06.3 | +5:55.9 |
| 55 | 46 | Tad Elliot | United States | 1:20:08.8 | +5:58.4 |
| 56 | 44 | Nobu Naruse | Japan | 1:20:10.9 | +6:00.5 |
| 57 | 48 | Aivar Rehemaa | Estonia | 1:20:23.3 | +6:12.9 |
| 58 | 50 | Andrew Musgrave | United Kingdom | 1:20:23.3 | +6:12.9 |
| 59 | 61 | Veselin Tzinzov | Bulgaria | 1:20:25.8 | +6:15.4 |
| 60 | 60 | Roman Leybyuk | Ukraine | 1:21:05.4 | +6:55.0 |
| 61 | 71 | Aleksandr Ossipov | Kazakhstan | 1:21:10.4 | +7:00.0 |
| 62 | 54 | Ben Sim | Australia | 1:21:53.6 | +7:43.2 |
| 63 | 58 | Masaya Kimura | Japan | 1:22:34.5 | +8:24.1 |
| 64 | 53 | Javier Gutiérrez | Spain | 1:22:38.1 | +8:27.7 |
| 65 | 57 | Eirik Brandsdal | Norway | 1:23:20.9 | +9:10.5 |
| 66 | 64 | Myroslav Bilosyuk | Ukraine | 1:23:36.9 | +9:26.5 |
| 67 | 66 | Nils Koons | New Zealand | LAP | |
| 68 | 69 | Callum Watson | Australia | LAP | |
| 69 | 75 | Ewan Watson | Australia | LAP | |
| 70 | 76 | Benjamin Koons | New Zealand | LAP | |
| 71 | 78 | Artem Rojin | Kyrgyzstan | LAP | |
| 72 | 73 | Jonas Thor Olsen | Denmark | LAP | |
| 73 | 68 | Petrică Hogiu | Romania | LAP | |
| 74 | 70 | Kristian Wulff | Denmark | LAP | |
| 75 | 77 | Nick Grimmer | Australia | LAP | |
| 76 | 79 | Federico Pablo Cichero | Argentina | LAP | |
| 77 | 74 | Andrej Burić | Croatia | LAP | |
| 78 | 82 | Philip Boit | Kenya | LAP | |
| 79 | 80 | Leandro Ribela | Brazil | LAP | |
| 80 | 81 | Leonardo Lutz | Brazil | LAP | |
| 81 | 83 | Cesar Baena | Venezuela | LAP | |
| | 65 | Rok Trsan | Slovenia | DNF | |
| | 67 | Kaspar Kokk | Estonia | DNF | |
| | 84 | Bernardo Baena | Venezuela | DNS | |
