= FIS Nordic World Ski Championships 2009 – Men's 50 kilometre freestyle =

Men's 50 kilometre freestyle at the FIS Nordic World Ski Championships 2009
- Venue: Liberec
- Date: 1 March 2009
- Competitors: 72
- Winning time: 1:59:38.1

Medalists
gold medal	Petter Northug	Norway
silver medal	Maxim Vylegzhanin	Russia
bronze medal	Tobias Angerer	Germany

The men's 50 kilometre freestyle at the FIS Nordic World Ski Championships 2009 took place on 1 March 2009 at 13:00 CET at Liberec.

== Results ==
Rank	Bib	Athlete	Country	Time	Deficit
1st place, gold medalist(s)	2	Petter Northug	Norway	1:59:38.1	—
2nd place, silver medalist(s)	18	Maxim Vylegzhanin	Russia	1:59:38.8	+0.7
3rd place, bronze medalist(s)	7	Tobias Angerer	Germany	1:59:40.1	+2.0
4	6	Giorgio Di Centa	Italy	1:59:42.1	+4.0
5	21	Sergei Dolidovich	Belarus	1:59:43.7	+5.6
6	19	René Sommerfeldt	Germany	1:59:45.6	+7.5
7	28	Martin Koukal	Czech Republic	1:59:46.2	+8.1
8	40	Teemu Kattilakoski	Finland	1:59:46.5	+8.4
9	4	Vincent Vittoz	France	1:59:47.2	+9.1
10	11	Aivar Rehemaa	Estonia	1:59:47.3	+9.2
11	1	Pietro Piller Cottrer	Italy	1:59:48.0	+9.9
12	35	Cristian Zorzi	Italy	1:59:49.1	+11.0
13	17	Emmanuel Jonnier	France	1:59:50.7	+12.6
14	15	Toni Livers	Switzerland	1:59:51.4	+13.3
15	54	Juha Lallukka	Finland	1:59:51.9	+13.8
16	10	Ivan Babikov	Canada	1:59:53.8	+15.7
17	22	Jiri Magal	Czech Republic	1:59:55.6	+17.5
18	5	Alexander Legkov	Russia	1:59:56.6	+18.5
19	24	Remo Fischer	Switzerland	1:59:57.1	+19.0
20	14	Tord Asle Gjerdalen	Norway	2:00:02.7	+24.6
21	34	Martin Bajcicak	Slovakia	2:00:02.8	+24.7
22	3	Jean Marc Gaillard	France	2:00:19.4	+41.3
23	12	Tom Reichelt	Germany	2:00:28.7	+50.6
24	33	Christian Hoffmann	Austria	2:00:31.1	+53.0
25	20	Ville Nousiainen	Finland	2:00:59.1	+1:21.0
26	25	Curdin Perl	Switzerland	2:01:40.6	+2:02.5
27	13	Marcus Hellner	Sweden	2:01:42.8	+2:04.7
28	29	Christophe Perrillat	France	2:01:49.2	+2:11.1
29	31	Mathias Fredriksson	Sweden	2:02:27.3	+2:49.2
30	32	Daniel Rickardsson	Sweden	2:02:36.0	+2:57.9
31	44	Alexander Lasutkin	Belarus	2:03:30.4	+3:52.3
32	37	Milan Sperl	Czech Republic	2:03:30.8	+3:52.7
33	39	Diego Ruiz	Spain	2:03:42.4	+4:04.3
34	38	Dusan Kozisek	Czech Republic	2:04:08.5	+4:30.4
35	26	Ivan Arteev	Russia	2:05:06.5	+5:28.4
36	30	David Hofer	Italy	2:05:38.7	+6:00.6
37	8	Matti Heikkinen	Finland	2:06:13.3	+6:35.2
38	51	James Southam	United States	2:06:15.2	+6:37.1
39	46	Chris Butler	Canada	2:07:45.6	+8:07.5
40	55	Mikhail Gumenyak	Ukraine	2:08:28.7	+8:50.6
...	...	...	...	...	...
61	68	Cesar Baena	Venezuela	LAP	—
—	16	Evgeniy Dementiev	Russia	DSQ	—
—	36	Ivan Batory	Slovakia	DNF	—
—	43	Yevgeniy Velichko	Kazakhstan	DNF	—
—	52	Leanid Karneyenka	Belarus	DNF	—
—	56	Sergei Kuzmenko	Belarus	DNF	—
—	64	Nat Anglem	New Zealand	DNF	—
—	69	Roberto Carcelen	Peru	DNF	—
—	9	Anders Södergren	Sweden	DNS	—
—	23	Tore Ruud Hofstad	Norway	DNS	—
—	27	Sergey Cherepanov	Kazakhstan	DNS	—
—	41	Kaspar Kokk	Estonia	DNS	—
