= FIS Nordic World Ski Championships 2011 – Men's 50 kilometre freestyle =

Men's 50 kilometre freestyle at the FIS Nordic World Ski Championships 2011
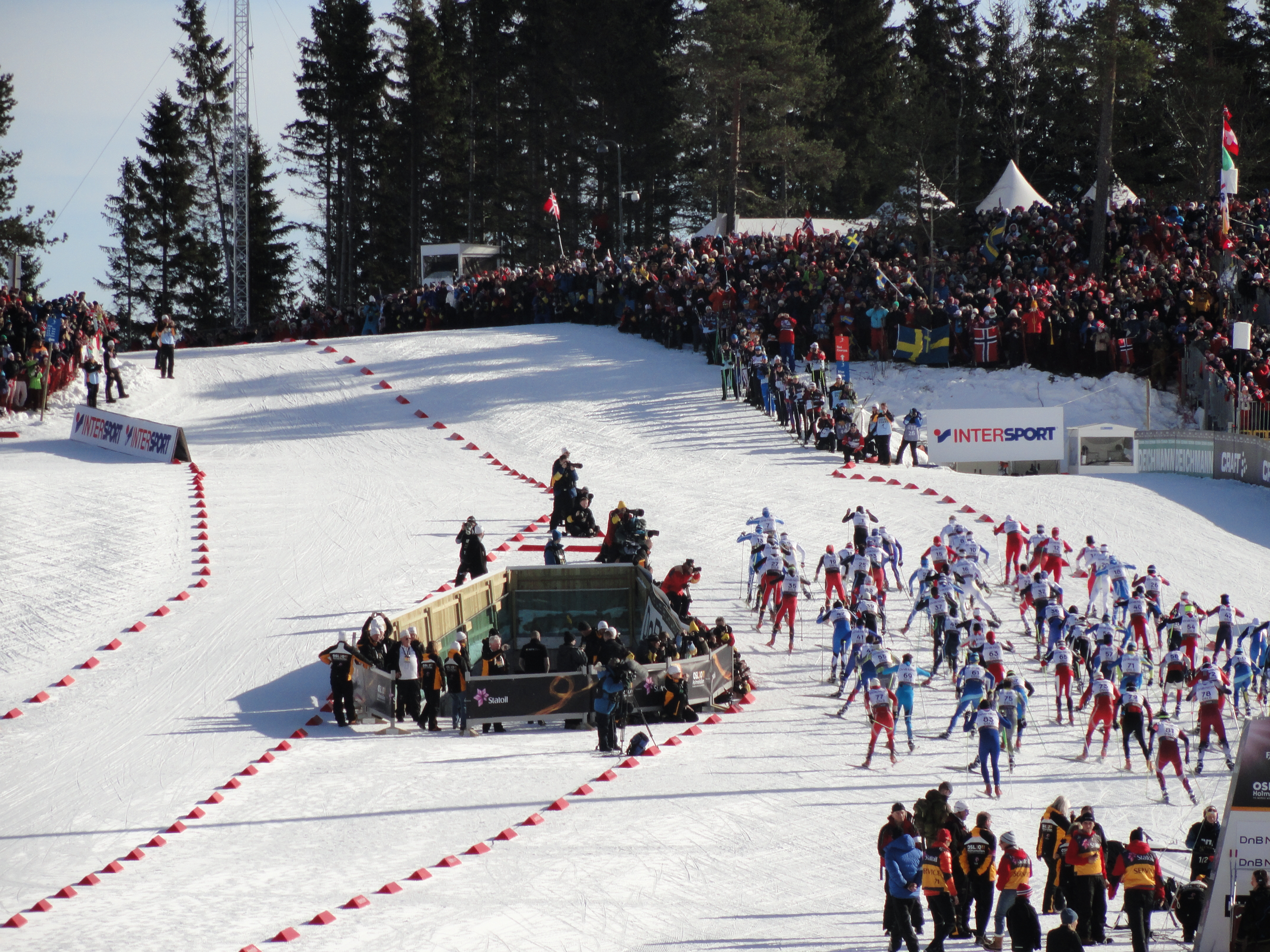
- The starting field in the 50 km men's freestyle
- Venue: Holmenkollen National Arena
- Date: 6 March 2011
- Competitors: 85
- Winning time: 2:08:09.0

Medalists
gold medal	Petter Northug	Norway
silver medal	Maxim Vylegzhanin	Russia
bronze medal	Tord Asle Gjerdalen	Norway

The Men's 50 km freestyle mass start was the final event of the FIS Nordic World Ski Championships 2011. It was held at 6 March 2011 at 13:00 CET. Norway's Petter Northug is both the defending world and Olympic champion.

== Results ==
Rank	Bib	Athlete	Country	Time	Deficit
1st place, gold medalist(s)	4	Petter Northug	Norway	2:08:09.0	
2nd place, silver medalist(s)	6	Maxim Vylegzhanin	Russia	2:08:10.7	+1.7
3rd place, bronze medalist(s)	15	Tord Asle Gjerdalen	Norway	2:08:15.3	+6.3
4	34	Sjur Røthe	Norway	2:08:17.0	+8.0
5	14	Alex Harvey	Canada	2:08:17.2	+8.2
6	19	Tobias Angerer	Germany	2:08:17.2	+8.2
7	2	Daniel Rickardsson	Sweden	2:08:17.5	+8.5
8	38	Juha Lallukka	Finland	2:08:19.4	+10.4
9	11	Giorgio Di Centa	Italy	2:08:33.9	+24.9
10	37	Sergei Dolidovich	Belarus	2:08:35.9	+26.9
11	33	Petter Eliassen	Norway	2:08:36.9	+27.9
12	8	Ilia Chernousov	Russia	2:08:40.5	+31.5
13	3	Lukáš Bauer	Czech Republic	2:08:41.1	+32.1
14	16	Anders Södergren	Sweden	2:08:41.5	+32.5
15	5	Marcus Hellner	Sweden	2:08:47.4	+38.4
16	20	Johan Olsson	Sweden	2:08:47.4	+38.4
17	22	Ivan Babikov	Canada	2:08:59.2	+50.2
18	17	Tom Reichelt	Germany	2:09:31.2	+1:22.2
19	21	Pietro Piller Cottrer	Italy	2:09:31.5	+1:22.5
20	1	Dario Cologna	Switzerland	2:09:58.7	+1:49.7
21	31	Thomas Moriggl	Italy	2:10:18.6	+2:09.6
22	18	Vincent Vittoz	France	2:10:40.9	+2:31.9
23	36	Martin Koukal	Czech Republic	2:10:45.7	+2:36.7
24	12	Martin Johnsrud Sundby	Norway	2:11:12.0	+3:03.0
25	28	Martin Bajčičák	Slovakia	2:11:25.1	+3:16.1
26	25	Ville Nousiainen	Finland	2:11:31.3	+3:22.3
27	35	Franz Göring	Germany	2:11:49.4	+3:40.4
28	10	Roland Clara	Italy	2:12:00.8	+3:51.8
29	23	Konstantin Glavatskikh	Russia	2:12:46.0	+4:37.0
30	43	Noah Hoffman	United States	2:12:47.7	+4:38.7
31	45	Tero Similae	Finland	2:13:28.3	+5:19.3
32	46	Aivar Rehemaa	Estonia	2:13:28.4	+5:19.4
33	29	Robin Duvillard	France	2:13:29.9	+5:20.9
34	27	Tim Tscharnke	Germany	2:14:07.3	+5:58.3
35	48	Teemu Kattilakoski	Finland	2:14:56.6	+6:47.6
36	26	Keishin Yoshida	Japan	2:15:27.3	+7:18.3
37	30	Remo Fischer	Switzerland	2:15:29.3	+7:20.3
38	50	Sergey Cherepanov	Kazakhstan	2:15:42.0	+7:33.0
39	39	Lars Flora	United States	2:15:42.4	+7:33.4
40	44	Tad Elliot	United States	2:15:45.8	+7:36.8
41	24	Sergey Shiryayev	Russia	2:15:55.6	+7:46.6
42	62	Eeri Vahtra	Estonia	2:16:11.4	+8:02.4
43	41	Jiří Magál	Czech Republic	2:17:08.9	+8:59.9
44	9	Curdin Perl	Switzerland	2:17:27.0	+9:18.0
45	13	Maurice Manificat	France	2:17:36.6	+9:27.6
46	56	Vicenç Vilarrubla	Spain	2:18:11.2	+10:02.2
47	40	Juergen Pinter	Austria	2:18:19.8	+10:10.8
48	65	Bernhard Tritscher	Austria	2:19:00.7	+10:51.7
49	47	Karel Tammjärv	Estonia	2:20:01.1	+11:52.1
50	51	Michail Semenov	Belarus	2:20:01.4	+11:52.4
51	84	Bill Demong	United States	2:20:06.9	+11:57.9
52	60	Gennadiy Matviyenko	Kazakhstan	2:20:12.6	+12:03.6
53	71	Yerdos Akhmadiyev	Kazakhstan	2:20:13.0	+12:04.0
54	58	Diego Ruiz	Spain	2:21:00.1	+12:51.1
55	32	Toni Livers	Switzerland	2:21:12.2	+13:03.2
56	42	Nobu Naruse	Japan	2:22:16.6	+14:07.6
57	66	Ioseba Rojo	Spain	2:23:00.1	+14:51.1
58	53	Javier Gutiérrez	Spain	2:23:07.4	+14:58.4
59	49	Andrew Musgrave	United Kingdom	2:23:54.5	+15:45.5
60	63	Thomas Grader	Austria	2:24:18.2	+16:09.2
61	67	Oleksiy Shvidkiy	Ukraine	2:25:04.7	+16:55.7
62	76	Benjamin Koons	New Zealand	2:26:54.2	+18:45.2
63	55	Ben Sim	Australia	2:28:16.2	+20:07.2
64	54	Johannes Duerr	Austria	2:30:05.1	+21:56.1
65	64	Ivan Bilosyuk	Ukraine	2:30:10.5	+22:01.5
66	68	Callum Watson	Australia	2:30:43.9	+22:34.9
67	78	Raivis Zīmelis	Latvia	2:31:05.8	+22:56.8
68	69	Francois Soulie	Andorra	2:32:33.7	+24:24.7
69	72	Jonas Thor Olsen	Denmark	2:36:06.1	+27:57.1
70	73	Asger Fischer Moelgaard	Denmark	LAP	
71	70	Arvis Liepiņš	Latvia	LAP	
72	75	Ewan Watson	Australia	LAP	
73	74	Chris Darlington	Australia	LAP	
74	79	Pavles Ribakovs	Latvia	LAP	
75	77	Jens Hulgaard	Denmark	LAP	
76	80	Simon James Platt	United Kingdom	LAP	
77	81	Janis Teteris	Latvia	LAP	
78	82	Leonardo Lutz	Brazil	LAP	
79	83	Cesar Baena	Venezuela	LAP	
	7	Jean-Marc Gaillard	France	DNF	
	57	Masaya Kimura	Japan	DNF	
	61	Denis Volotka	Kazakhstan	DNF	
	52	Petr Novák	Czech Republic	DNS	
	59	Alexander Lasutkin	Belarus	DNS	
	85	Bernardo Baena	Venezuela	DNS	
