= Ivan Arteyev =

Russian cross-country skier

Personal information
- Nationality: Russian
- Born: 24 March 1977 (age 48); Respublika Komi, Russia

Sport
- Sport: Cross-country skiing

Ivan Arteyev (born 24 March 1977) is a Russian cross-country skier. He competed in the men's 15 kilometre classical event at the 2006 Winter Olympics.
