= Cross-country skiing at the 2010 Winter Olympics – Men's 4 × 10 kilometre relay =

Men's 4 × 10 kilometre relay at the XXI Olympic Winter Games
- Pictogram for cross country
- Venue: Whistler Olympic Park
- Dates: 24 February 2010
- Competitors: 56 (14 teams) from 14 nations
- Winning time: 1:45:05.4

Medalists
| 1st place, gold medalist(s) | | Daniel Rickardsson; Johan Olsson; Anders Södergren; Marcus Hellner | Sweden |
| 2nd place, silver medalist(s) | | Martin Johnsrud Sundby; Odd-Bjørn Hjelmeset; Lars Berger; Petter Northug | Norway |
| 3rd place, bronze medalist(s) | | Martin Jakš; Lukáš Bauer; Jiří Magál; Martin Koukal | Czech Republic |

The men's 4 × 10 kilometre relay cross-country skiing competition at the 2010 Winter Olympics in Vancouver, Canada, was held on 24 February at Whistler Olympic Park at 11:15 PST.

Italy was the defending Olympic champion with the team of Fulvio Valbusa, Giorgio Di Centa, Pietro Piller Cottrer and Cristian Zorzi. Valbusa retired following the 2006 Winter Olympics. The defending world champions were the Norwegian team of Eldar Rønning, Odd-Bjørn Hjelmeset, Tore Ruud Hofstad and Petter Northug. The last World Cup competition for this event prior to the 2010 Games took place 22 November 2009 in Beitostoelen, Norway, and was won by the Norwegian team of Rønning, Martin Johnsrud Sundby, Ronny Hafsås and Northug.

Each team used four skiers, who competed over one 3.3 km circuit in classical and a second 3.3 km circuit in freestyle. The first two raced in the classical technique, and the final pair of skiers raced freestyle technique.

== Results ==
Jauhojärvi of Finland (who finished fifth) had the fastest first leg with the second and third place teams being France (who would finish fourth) and Sweden. Bauer of the Czech Republic had the fastest run in the second leg and the classical style to propel his country from ninth in the first leg to second in the second leg. Sweden moved from third to first in the second leg while France fell from second to third. France's Manificat had the fastest third leg to move his team from third to second in the third leg. Sweden still led after the third run while the Czech Republic dropped from second to third. Defending world champion Norway, who was sixth after the third leg with Johnsrud Sundby replacing Rønning and biathlete Berger replacing both Hofstad and Hafsås, before anchor leg Northug had the fastest final run and in the freestyle technique to move his team to the silver medal, edging out the Czech Republic's Koukal. Defending Olympic champion Italy, with Checchi replacing Valbusa, finished a disappointing ninth. Despite not having any of the fastest legs, Sweden won their first relay Olympic gold medal since 1988.

| Rank | Bib | Country | Time | Deficit |
|---|---|---|---|---|
| 1st place, gold medalist(s) | 6 | Sweden; Daniel Rickardsson; Johan Olsson; Anders Södergren; Marcus Hellner | 1:45:05.4; 27:57.9; 27:55.2; 24:35.2; 24:37.1 | — |
| 2nd place, silver medalist(s) | 1 | Norway; Martin Johnsrud Sundby; Odd-Bjørn Hjelmeset; Lars Berger; Petter Northug | 1:45:21.3; 27:59.9; 28:27.5; 24:38.4; 24:15.5 | +15.9 |
| 3rd place, bronze medalist(s) | 11 | Czech Republic; Martin Jakš; Lukáš Bauer; Jiří Magál; Martin Koukal | 1:45:21.9; 28:22.4; 27:36.4; 24:34.8; 24:48.3 | +16.5 |
| 4 | 9 | France; Jean-Marc Gaillard; Vincent Vittoz; Maurice Manificat; Emmanuel Jonnier | 1:45:26.3; 27:56.7; 28:03.6; 24:31.5; 24:54.5 | +20.9 |
| 5 | 3 | Finland; Sami Jauhojärvi; Matti Heikkinen; Teemu Kattilakoski; Ville Nousiainen | 1:45:30.3; 27:55.6; 28:32.3; 24:37.1; 24:25.3 | +24.9 |
| 6 | 2 | Germany; Jens Filbrich; Axel Teichmann; René Sommerfeldt; Tobias Angerer | 1:45:49.4; 27:58.3; 28:22.6; 24:43.7; 24:44.8 | +44.0 |
| 7 | 5 | Canada; Devon Kershaw; Alex Harvey; Ivan Babikov; George Grey | 1:47:03.2; 28:23.8; 28:21.3; 24:33.5; 25:44.6 | +1:57.8 |
| 8 | 13 | Russia; Nikolay Pankratov; Petr Sedov; Alexander Legkov; Maxim Vylegzhanin | 1:47:04.7; 28:33.4; 28:07.4; 24:56.9; 25:27.0 | +1:59.3 |
| 9 | 4 | Italy; Valerio Checchi; Giorgio Di Centa; Pietro Piller Cottrer; Cristian Zorzi | 1:47:16.6; 28:22.1; 28:34.3; 24:39.8; 25:40.4 | +2:11.2 |
| 10 | 7 | Switzerland; Toni Livers; Curdin Perl; Remo Fischer; Dario Cologna | 1:47:57.2; 28:20.7; 28:26.7; 25:35.1; 25:34.7 | +2:51.8 |
| 11 | 10 | Kazakhstan; Sergey Cherepanov; Alexey Poltaranin; Yevgeniy Velichko; Nikolay Chebotko | 1:49:49.1; 28:36.1; 27:45.2; 26:38.3; 26:49.5 | +4:43.7 |
| 12 | 14 | Slovakia; Martin Bajčičák; Ivan Bátory; Michal Malak; Peter Mlynár | 1:49:52.0; 28:21.2; 28:28.7; 25:49.6; 27:12.5 | +4:46.6 |
| 13 | 12 | United States; Andrew Newell; Torin Koos; Garrott Kuzzy; Simi Hamilton | 1:51:27.7; 28:37.9; 30:01.5; 25:49.6; 26:58.7 | +6:22.3 |
| 14 | 8 | Estonia; Algo Kärp; Jaak Mae; Aivar Rehemaa; Kaspar Kokk | 1:51:41.2; 29:54.6; 28:43.4; 25:50.0; 27:13.2 | +6:35.8 |

== See also ==
- Cross-country skiing at the 2010 Winter Paralympics – Men's 1 x 4 km + 2 x 5 km Relay
