= Cross-country skiing at the 2006 Winter Olympics – Men's 15 kilometre classical =

Men's 15 kilometre classical at the XX Olympic Winter Games
- Venue: Pragelato
- Dates: 17 February 2006
- Competitors: 99 from 46 nations
- Winning time: 38:01.3

Medalists
1st place, gold medalist(s)		Andrus Veerpalu; Estonia
2nd place, silver medalist(s)		Lukáš Bauer; Czech Republic
3rd place, bronze medalist(s)		Tobias Angerer; Germany

The men's 15 kilometre classical cross-country skiing competition at the 2006 Winter Olympics in Turin, Italy, was held on 17 February at Pragelato.

Each skier started at half a minute intervals, skiing the entire 15 kilometre course. Pietro Piller Cottrer was the 2005 World champion, though he did it in freestyle. The defending Olympic champion was the Estonian Andrus Veerpalu, who won in Salt Lake. There had been three World Cup events in this competition: German Tobias Angerer won the first in November, Vasily Rochev of Russia won in Estonia in January, and Jens Arne Svartedal won in Davos a week and a half before the games. However, neither of the World Cup winners took the gold in Turin, as defending champion Veerpalu peaked at the right time to win by 14 seconds.

== Results ==
Martin Tauber, an Austrian skier, originally placed 8th, but was disqualified after the IOC declared him permanently ineligible for doping-related violations.

The race was started at 10:00.

Rank	Bib	Name	Country	Time	Deficit
1st place, gold medalist(s)	89	Andrus Veerpalu	Estonia	38:01.3	–
2nd place, silver medalist(s)	93	Lukáš Bauer	Czech Republic	38:15.8	+14.5
3rd place, bronze medalist(s)	99	Tobias Angerer	Germany	38:20.5	+19.2
4	91	Vasily Rochev	Russia	38:24.4	+23.1
5	79	Jaak Mae	Estonia	38:35.2	+33.9
6	74	Johan Olsson	Sweden	38:38.8	+37.5
7	85	Andreas Schlütter	Germany	38:44.7	+43.4
8	88	Sergey Novikov	Russia	39:15.0	+1:13.7
9	84	Sami Jauhojärvi	Finland	39:15.3	+1:14.0
10	92	Anders Södergren	Sweden	39:17.1	+1:15.8
11	95	René Sommerfeldt	Germany	39:17.2	+1:15.9
12	80	Fulvio Valbusa	Italy	39:18.8	+1:17.5
13	94	Mathias Fredriksson	Sweden	39:19.1	+1:17.8
14	98	Vincent Vittoz	France	39:27.3	+1:26.0
15	49	Alexander Lasutkin	Belarus	39:35.3	+1:34.0
16	96	Frode Estil	Norway	39:39.6	+1:38.3
17	65	Roman Leybyuk	Ukraine	39:48.1	+1:46.8
18	87	Alexandre Rousselet	France	39:48.4	+1:47.1
19	69	Mats Larsson	Sweden	39:51.7	+1:50.4
20	76	Anders Aukland	Norway	39:53.6	+1:52.3
21	73	Kris Freeman	United States	39:57.4	+1:56.1
22	77	Ivan Babikov	Russia	39:59.5	+1:58.2
23	71	Jean-Marc Gaillard	France	40:09.2	+2:07.9
24	78	Christophe Perrillat	France	40:12.0	+2:10.7
25	54	Janusz Krężelok	Poland	40:24.5	+2:23.2
26	64	Ivan Bátory	Slovakia	40:26.1	+2:24.8
27	81	Odd-Bjørn Hjelmeset	Norway	40:31.3	+2:30.0
28	82	Martin Bajčičák	Slovakia	40:35.6	+2:34.3
29	63	Christian Stebler	Switzerland	40:38.6	+2:37.3
30	48	Dmitrij Eremenko	Kazakhstan	40:42.8	+2:41.5
31	61	George Grey	Canada	40:43.9	+2:42.6
32	72	Tero Similä	Finland	40:44.5	+2:43.2
33	83	Fabio Santus	Italy	40:47.0	+2:45.7
34	46	Ivan Arteev	Russia	40:49.1	+2:47.8
35	55	Kaspar Kokk	Estonia	40:51.7	+2:50.4
36	67	Maxim Odnodvortsev	Kazakhstan	40:53.2	+2:51.9
37	52	Andrey Golovko	Kazakhstan	40:58.0	+2:56.7
38	86	Valerio Checchi	Italy	41:01.5	+3:00.2
39	21	Alexey Poltaranin	Kazakhstan	41:09.7	+3:08.4
40	68	Cristian Saracco	Italy	41:12.0	+3:10.7
41	53	Nobu Naruse	Japan	41:22.0	+3:20.7
42	70	Katsuhito Ebisawa	Japan	41:25.8	+3:24.5
43	75	Franz Göring	Germany	41:29.9	+3:28.6
44	97	Jens Arne Svartedal	Norway	41:32.4	+3:31.1
45	60	Priit Narusk	Estonia	41:35.8	+3:34.5
46	66	Diego Ruiz	Spain	41:37.9	+3:36.6
47	41	Devon Kershaw	Canada	41:42.7	+3:41.4
48	62	Olli Ohtonen	Finland	41:47.4	+3:46.1
49	36	Xia Wan	China	41:48.0	+3:46.7
50	47	Lars Flora	United States	41:53.1	+3:51.8
51	59	Andrew Johnson	United States	41:53.9	+3:52.6
52	51	Justin Freeman	United States	42:00.9	+3:59.6
53	42	Drew Goldsack	Canada	42:09.3	+4:08.0
54	39	Lauri Pyykönen	Finland	42:10.4	+4:09.1
55	27	Sabahattin Oglago	Turkey	42:18.9	+4:17.6
56	32	Vladimir Olschanski	Ukraine	42:39.6	+4:38.3
57	58	Dan Roycroft	Canada	42:39.7	+4:38.4
58	57	Petr Michl	Czech Republic	42:54.0	+4:52.7
59	45	Jože Mehle	Slovenia	42:56.9	+4:55.6
60	50	Vitaly Martsyv	Ukraine	42:57.4	+4:56.1
61	40	Zsolt Antal	Romania	43:10.0	+5:08.7
62	43	Li Geliang	China	43:14.7	+5:13.4
63	37	Oleksandr Batiuk	Ukraine	43:17.4	+5:16.1
64	38	Tian Ye	China	43:32.2	+5:30.9
65	56	Vicente Vilarrubla	Spain	43:47.2	+5:45.9
66	33	Denis Klobučar	Croatia	43:55.4	+5:54.1
67	20	Ivan Bariakov	Bulgaria	44:06.3	+6:05.0
68	24	Valts Eiduks	Latvia	44:12.0	+6:10.7
69	28	Wang Songtao	China	44:12.2	+6:10.9
70	23	Damir Jurčević	Croatia	44:20.8	+6:19.5
71	25	Francesc Soulie	Andorra	44:42.6	+6:41.3
72	26	Mihai Galiceanu	Romania	44:52.0	+6:50.7
73	44	Michal Malák	Slovakia	44:52.9	+6:51.6
74	29	Muhammet Kızılarslan	Turkey	45:06.8	+7:05.5
75	22	Intars Spalvins	Latvia	45:13.4	+7:12.1
76	18	Zoltan Tagscherer	Hungary	45:20.3	+7:19.0
77	17	Olegs Andrejevs	Latvia	45:44.2	+7:42.9
78	31	Choi Im-heon	South Korea	46:21.7	+8:20.4
79	34	Park Byung-joo	South Korea	46:38.9	+8:37.6
80	30	Jung Eui-myung	South Korea	46:40.8	+8:39.5
81	19	Alen Abramović	Croatia	46:52.1	+8:50.8
82	14	Edmond Khachatryan	Armenia	47:37.8	+9:36.5
83	11	Robel Teklemariam	Ethiopia	47:53.8	+9:52.5
84	13	Darko Damjanovski	Macedonia	48:33.7	+10:32.4
85	1	Khash Erdene Khurelbaatar	Mongolia	48:47.2	+10:45.9
86	16	Martin Bianchi	Argentina	49:08.0	+11:06.7
87	9	Rory Morrish	Ireland	50:28.1	+12:26.8
88	10	Hovhannes Sargsyan	Armenia	50:45.7	+12:44.4
89	15	Bojan Samardija	Bosnia and Herzegovina	51:28.8	+13:27.5
90	8	Mojtaba Mirhashemi	Iran	52:27.0	+14:25.7
91	7	Phillip Kimely Boit	Kenya	53:32.4	+15:31.1
92	5	Helio Freitas	Brazil	54:06.8	+16:05.5
93	4	Danny Silva	Portugal	54:34.1	+16:32.8
94	6	Dachhiri Sherpa	Nepal	56:47.1	+18:45.8
95	2	Arturo Kinch	Costa Rica	1:06:50.3	+28:49.0
96	3	Prawat Nagvajara	Thailand	1:07:15.9	+29:14.6
	12	Oliver Kraas	South Africa	DNF	
	35	Aleksei Novoselski	Lithuania	DNF	
DQ	90	Martin Tauber	Austria	~~38:49.5~~	~~+48.2~~
