= Diego Ruiz (skier) =

Spanish cross-country skier (born 1977)

Diego Ruiz Asín (born 25 June 1977) is a Spanish cross-country skier who has competed in the World Cup since 1998. Ruiz competed at three Winter Olympics (1998, 2006, and 2010) and in four FIS Nordic World Ski Championships from 2003 to 2009. His best Olympic result is a 23rd place in the 50 km event in 2006. His best World Championships result is a 17th place at the 50 km event in Oberstdorf in 2005, and his best World Cup result is an 18th place at a 15 km event in Changchun in 2007.

Ruiz was born in Jaca, where he currently lives.
