= Cross-country skiing at the 2010 Winter Olympics – Men's team sprint =

Men's team sprint at the XXI Olympic Winter Games
- Pictogram for cross country
- Venue: Whistler Olympic Park
- Dates: 22 February 2010
- Competitors: 44 from 22 nations
- Winning time: 19:01.0

Medalists
1st place, gold medalist(s)		Øystein Pettersen; Petter Northug	Norway
2nd place, silver medalist(s)		Tim Tscharnke; Axel Teichmann	Germany
3rd place, bronze medalist(s)		Nikolay Morilov; Alexey Petukhov	Russia

The men's team sprint cross-country skiing competition in the freestyle technique at the 2010 Winter Olympics in Vancouver, Canada was held on 22 February at Whistler Olympic Park in Whistler, British Columbia.

The Swedish team of Björn Lind and Thobias Fredriksson were the defending Olympic champions when the technique was classical. The defending world champions were the Norwegian duo of Ola Vigen Hattestad and Johan Kjølstad when the technique was also classical. Sweden's team of Emil Jönsson and Robin Bryntesson won the test event that took place at the Olympic venue on 18 January 2009. The last World Cup event in this format prior to the 2010 Games took place in Rybinsk, Russia on 24 January 2010 and was won by the Russian duo of Nikolay Morilov and Alexey Petukhov.

== Results ==
=== Semifinals ===
The semifinals took place at 11:35 and 12:00 PST.

Rank	Heat	Bib	Country	Athlete	Time	Note
1	1	1	Russia	Nikolay Morilov; Alexey Petukhov	18:47.6	Q
2	1	2	Norway	Øystein Pettersen; Petter Northug	18:48.5	Q
3	1	5	Germany	Tim Tscharnke; Axel Teichmann	18:48.9	Q
4	1	4	Canada	Devon Kershaw; Alex Harvey	18:49.2	q
5	1	6	Finland	Lasse Paakkonen; Ville Nousiainen	18:54.3	q
6	1	7	Poland	Maciej Kreczmer; Janusz Krężelok	19:07.2	
7	1	11	Slovakia	Ivan Bátory; Michal Malák	19:07.5	
8	1	3	Estonia	Anti Saarepuu; Peeter Kümmel	19:27.6	
9	1	9	Lithuania	Modestas Vaičiulis; Mantas Strolia	19:43.1	
10	1	8	China	Sun Qinghai; Xu Wenlong	19:43.6	
	1	10	Great Britain	Andrew Musgrave; Andrew Young	DNF	
1	2	16	Czech Republic	Dušan Kožíšek; Martin Koukal	18:43.1	Q
2	2	19	France	Vincent Vittoz; Cyril Miranda	18:43.8	Q
3	2	15	Italy	Cristian Zorzi; Renato Pasini	18:43.9	Q
4	2	13	United States	Torin Koos; Andrew Newell	18:43.7	q
5	2	17	Kazakhstan	Nikolay Chebotko; Alexey Poltaranin	18:45.3	q
6	2	12	Switzerland	Eligius Tambornino; Dario Cologna	18:54.6	
7	2	18	Japan	Nobu Naruse; Yuichi Onda	18:54.8	
8	2	14	Sweden	Marcus Hellner; Teodor Peterson	19:06.5	
9	2	22	Romania	Paul Constantin Pepene; Petrica Hogiu	19:09.2	
10	2	20	Australia	Ben Sim; Paul Murray	19:57.0	
	2	21	Belarus	Sergei Dolidovich; Leanid Karneyenka	DNF	

=== Final ===
The following are the results of the event.

Neither of the Swedish pair that won at the previous Olympics or at the test event participated and the Swedish team was eliminated in the semifinals. Norway's defending world champions did not participate though the ones who replaced them would win gold. The Russian team that won the last event in this format prior to the Olympics would win bronze.

Rank	Bib	Country	Athlete	Time	Deficit
1st place, gold medalist(s)	2	Norway	Øystein Pettersen; Petter Northug	19:01.0	+0.0
2nd place, silver medalist(s)	5	Germany	Tim Tscharnke; Axel Teichmann	19:02.3	+1.3
3rd place, bronze medalist(s)	1	Russia	Nikolay Morilov; Alexey Petukhov	19:02.5	+1.5
4	4	Canada	Devon Kershaw; Alex Harvey	19:07.3	+6.3
5	17	Kazakhstan	Nikolay Chebotko; Alexey Poltaranin	19:07.5	+6.5
6	16	Czech Republic	Dušan Kožíšek; Martin Koukal	19:13.8	+12.8
7	19	France	Vincent Vittoz; Cyril Miranda	19:18.7	+17.7
8	15	Italy	Cristian Zorzi; Renato Pasini	19:21.1	+20.1
9	13	United States	Torin Koos; Andrew Newell	19:21.6	+20.6
10	6	Finland	Lasse Paakkonen; Ville Nousiainen	19:50.8	+49.8
