= Elina Pienimäki-Hietamäki =

Finnish cross-country skier

Personal information
- Born: 20 July 1976 (age 50) Oulu, Finland

Sport
- Sport: Skiing
- Club: Tampereen Pyrintö

World Cup career
- Seasons: 11 – (1995–2004, 2006)
- Indiv. starts: 69
- Indiv. podiums: 2
- Indiv. wins: 0
- Team starts: 18
- Team podiums: 2
- Team wins: 0
- Overall titles: 0 – (19th in 2004)
- Discipline titles: 0
Medal record
Women's cross-country skiing
Representing Finland
Junior World Championships
Bronze medal – third place	1996 Asiago	4 × 5 km relay

Elina Pienimäki-Hietamäki (born 20 July 1976) is a Finnish cross-country skier. She competed at the 2002 Winter Olympics and the 2006 Winter Olympics.

== Cross-country skiing results ==
All results are sourced from the International Ski Federation (FIS).

=== Olympic Games ===
Year	Age	10 km	15 km	Pursuit	30 km	Sprint	4 × 5 km relay	Team sprint
2002	25	—	—	40	—	14	—	—N/a
2006	29	—	—N/a	33	—	42	—	—

=== World Championships ===
Year	Age	5 km	15 km	Pursuit	30 km	Sprint	4 × 5 km relay
2001	24	—	—	—	CNX^{[a]}	8	—
2003	26	—	—	23	—	19	—

a. ^{1} Cancelled due to extremely cold weather.

=== World Cup ===
==== Season standings ====
Season	Age					
Season	Age	Overall	Distance	Long Distance	Middle Distance	Sprint
1995	18	NC	—N/a	—N/a	—N/a	—N/a
1996	19	NC	—N/a	—N/a	—N/a	—N/a
1997	20	NC	—N/a	NC	—N/a	NC
1998	21	NC	—N/a	NC	—N/a	—
1999	22	51	—N/a	NC	—N/a	23
2000	23	49	—N/a	NC	NC	31
2001	24	31	—N/a	—N/a	—N/a	10
2002	25	33	—N/a	—N/a	—N/a	12
2003	26	37	—N/a	—N/a	—N/a	25
2004	27	19	62	—N/a	—N/a	5
2006	28	74	64	—N/a	—N/a	64

==== Individual podiums ====
- 2 podiums – (2 WC)

No.	Season	Date	Location	Race	Level	Place
1	2003–04	26 February 2004	Drammen, Norway	1.2 km Sprint C	World Cup	3rd
2	2003–04	12 March 2004	Pragelato, Italy	1.0 km Sprint F	World Cup	3rd

==== Team podiums ====
- 2 podiums – (1 RL, 1 TS)

No.	Season	Date	Location	Race	Level	Place	Teammate(s)
1	2002–03	19 January 2003	Nové Město, Czech Republic	4 × 5 km Relay C/F	World Cup	3rd	Välimaa / Saarinen / Varis
2	2003–04	6 March 2004	Lahti, Finland	6 × 1.0 km Team Sprint C	World Cup	2nd	Manninen
