= Tor Arne Hetland =

Norwegian cross-country skier (born 1974)

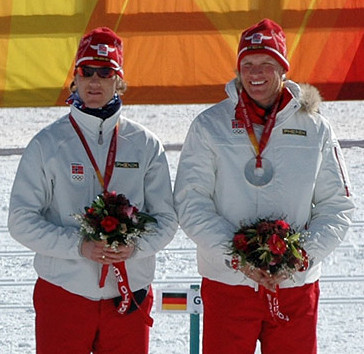
- Tor Arne Hetland (right) and Jens Arne Svartedal

Personal information
- Nationality: Norway
- Born: 12 January 1974 (age 52) Stavanger, Norway
- Spouse: Guri Hetland (m. 2004)

Sport
- Sport: Skiing
- Club: Byåsen IL

World Cup career
- Seasons: 15 – (1995–2009)
- Indiv. starts: 169
- Indiv. podiums: 35
- Indiv. wins: 13
- Team starts: 40
- Team podiums: 24
- Team wins: 12
- Overall titles: 0 – (3rd in 2005 and 2006)
- Discipline titles: 1 – (1 SP)
Medal record
Men's cross-country skiing
Representing Norway
International nordic ski competitions
Event	1st	2nd	3rd
Olympic Games	1	1	0
World Championships	3	1	1
Total	4	2	1
Olympic Games
Gold medal – first place	2002 Salt Lake City	Individual sprint
Silver medal – second place	2006 Turin	Team sprint
World Championships
Gold medal – first place	2001 Lahti	Individual sprint
Gold medal – first place	2001 Lahti	4 × 10 km relay
Gold medal – first place	2005 Oberstdorf	Team sprint
Silver medal – second place	2005 Oberstdorf	Individual sprint
Bronze medal – third place	2003 Val di Fiemme	Individual sprint
Junior World Championships
Gold medal – first place	1993 Harrachov	4 × 10 km relay
Silver medal – second place	1994 Breitenwang	4 × 10 km relay
Bronze medal – third place	1994 Breitenwang	30 km freestyle

Tor Arne Hetland (born 12 January 1974) is a Norwegian cross-country skiing coach and a former professional cross-country skier.

Hetland was born in Stavanger. He now lives in Trondheim. While active he represented Byåsen IL ski club. He was coached by Ulf Morten Aune. Hetland is 6 ft 2 in and 12 st 10 lb (178 lb).

== World Cup career ==
Hetland began his career in 1990, but only started competing in the World Cup in 1996/97, where he finished 11th in the long distance standings and 46th in the sprint, finishing 30th in the overall standings. The year after he did much worse, coming 42nd in the long distance, and 78th in the sprint, finishing 62nd overall. For the next three seasons he improved his overall standing and became a main contender in the sprint. In 1998/99 he came second in the sprints, and 23rd in the overall, in 1999/2000 he came fourth in the sprints but had a better long distance season than the one before, and in 2000/01 he came third in the sprints and 12th overall. In 2001/02 he came 13th in the overall standing, whilst finishing the sprint in sixth, and in 2003/04 he came fourth in the sprint, and claimed his first distance points, coming in 37th, and 14th in the overall. The following season, 2004/05, was Hetland's most successful year to date, winning the sprint title, and coming third in the overall standings.

Hetland finished the 2005/06 FIS World Cup season in third place, 259 points behind Tobias Angerer, and 7 points behind fellow countryman Jens Arne Svartedal. He finished third in the sprints, 163 points behind Björn Lind, and 20 points behind Thobias Fredriksson. He was 20th in the distance standings, 632 points behind Angerer.

Hetland has had 23 podium finishes in his World Cup career, 10 in first place, 10 in second place and three in third place. He has podiumed at least once every season since 1996/97, except for 1997/98 and 1999/2000. The most podium finishes he has had in one season was in 2004/05 when he had five. He had four in 2005/06 and three for three consecutive seasons from 2000/01. Of his 23 podium finishes all but three have come in sprints. His first non sprint podium was in 1996/97, when he came second in a 50 km race. In 2000/01 he came third in a 15 km race and on 19 November 2005 he won his first distance race (15 km) in Beitostølen, Norway. The victory on this particular course was no great shock as the Beitostølen track is very flat as the tracks on the cross country circuit goes, and when taken into consideration that the Norwegian athletes, much like the larger teams like the Germans and Russians, are expected to be in near top condition at the beginning of the season so as to secure team selection. His victory in the sprint event in Vernon, Canada on 12 December 2005, was his 100th career race.

== Retirement ==
Hetland announced his retirement the week of 27 April 2009 to a lingering knee injury and asthma. He stated that he "...[felt]... like I am quitting like I am top".

== Cross-country skiing results ==
All results are sourced from the International Ski Federation (FIS).

=== Olympic Games ===
- 2 medals – (1 gold, 1 silver)

Year	Age	10 km	15 km	Pursuit	30 km	50 km	Sprint	4 × 10 km relay	Team sprint
1998	24	—	—N/a	—	—	24	—N/a	—	—N/a
2002	28	—N/a	—	—	49	—	Gold	—	—N/a
2006	32	—N/a	—	—	—N/a	33	10	—	Silver

=== World Championships ===
- 5 medals – (3 gold, 1 silver, 1 bronze)

Year	Age	10 km	15 km	Pursuit	30 km	50 km	Sprint	4 × 10 km relay	Team sprint
1999	25	—	—N/a	—	17	—	—N/a	—	—N/a
2001	27	—N/a	—	7	—	DNS	Gold	Gold	—N/a
2003	29	—N/a	—	—	—	—	Bronze	—	—N/a
2005	31	—N/a	—	—	—N/a	—	Silver	—	Gold
2007	32	—N/a	—	—	—N/a	—	18	—	7
2009	34	—N/a	—	—	—N/a	—	22	—	—

=== World Cup ===
==== Season titles ====
- 1 title – (1 sprint)

Season
Season	Discipline
2005	Sprint

==== Season standings ====
Season	Age	Discipline standings					Ski Tour standings	
Season	Age	Overall	Distance	Long Distance	Middle Distance	Sprint	Tour de Ski	World Cup Final
1995	21	NC	—N/a	—N/a	—N/a	—N/a	—N/a	—N/a
1996	22	NC	—N/a	—N/a	—N/a	—N/a	—N/a	—N/a
1997	23	30	—N/a	11	—N/a	46	—N/a	—N/a
1998	24	63	—N/a	42	—N/a	78	—N/a	—N/a
1999	25	23	—N/a	24	—N/a	2nd place, silver medalist(s)	—N/a	—N/a
2000	26	18	—N/a	22	52	4	—N/a	—N/a
2001	27	12	—N/a	—N/a	—N/a	3rd place, bronze medalist(s)	—N/a	—N/a
2002	28	13	—N/a	—N/a	—N/a	6	—N/a	—N/a
2003	29	9	—N/a	—N/a	—N/a	2nd place, silver medalist(s)	—N/a	—N/a
2004	30	14	37	—N/a	—N/a	4	—N/a	—N/a
2005	31	3rd place, bronze medalist(s)	61	—N/a	—N/a	1st place, gold medalist(s)	—N/a	—N/a
2006	32	3rd place, bronze medalist(s)	20	—N/a	—N/a	3rd place, bronze medalist(s)	—N/a	—N/a
2007	33	4	21	—N/a	—N/a	4	5	—N/a
2008	34	6	16	—N/a	—N/a	5	5	DNF
2009	35	19	58	—N/a	—N/a	3rd place, bronze medalist(s)	42	—

==== Individual podiums ====
- 13 victories (11 WC, 2 SWC)
- 35 podiums (30 WC, 5 SWC)

No.	Season	Date	Location	Race	Level	Place
1	1995–96	4 February 1996	Reit im Winkl, Germany	1.0 km Sprint F	World Cup	1st
2	1996–97	15 March 1997	Oslo, Norway	50 km Individual F	World Cup	2nd
3	1998–99	27 December 1998	Garmisch-Partenkirchen, Germany	1.0 km Sprint F	World Cup	1st
4	1998–99	28 December 1998	Engelberg, Switzerland	1.0 km Sprint F	World Cup	1st
5	2000–01	8 December 2000	Santa Caterina, Italy	15 km Individual F	World Cup	3rd
6	2000–01	28 December 2000	Engelberg, Switzerland	1.0 km Sprint C	World Cup	2nd
7	2000–01	29 December 2000	Engelberg, Switzerland	1.0 km Sprint F	World Cup	1st
8	2001–02	9 December 2001	Cogne, Italy	1.5 km Sprint F	World Cup	2nd
9	2001–02	27 December 2001	Garmisch-Partenkirchen, Germany	1.5 km Sprint F	World Cup	2nd
10	2001–02	29 December 2001	Salzburg, Austria	1.5 km Sprint C	World Cup	3rd
11	2002–03	26 October 2002	Düsseldorf, Germany	1.5 km Sprint F	World Cup	3rd
12	2002–03	11 December 2002	Clusone, Italy	1.5 km Sprint F	World Cup	1st
13	2002–03	15 December 2002	Cogne, Italy	1.5 km Sprint C	World Cup	1st
14	2003–04	26 February 2004	Drammen, Norway	1.2 km Sprint C	World Cup	2nd
15	2004–05	23 October 2004	Düsseldorf, Germany	1.5 km Sprint F	World Cup	2nd
16	2004–05	4 December 2004	Bern, Switzerland	1.35 km Sprint F	World Cup	1st
17	2004–05	14 December 2004	Asiago, Italy	1.2 km Sprint C	World Cup	2nd
18	2004–05	5 March 2005	Lahti, Finland	1.4 km Sprint C	World Cup	2nd
19	2004–05	9 March 2005	Drammen, Norway	1.2 km Sprint C	World Cup	1st
20	2005–06	22 October 2004	Düsseldorf, Germany	1.5 km Sprint F	World Cup	2nd
21	2005–06	19 November 2005	Beitostølen, Norway	15 km Individual C	World Cup	1st
22	2005–06	11 December 2005	Vernon, Canada	1.3 km Sprint F	World Cup	1st
23	2005–06	8 January 2006	Otepää, Estonia	1.5 km Sprint C	World Cup	2nd
24	2006–07	28 October 2006	Düsseldorf, Germany	1.5 km Sprint F	World Cup	3rd
25	2006–07	25 November 2006	Rukatunturi, Finland	1.2 km Sprint C	World Cup	3rd
26	2006–07	13 December 2006	Cogne, Italy	15 km Individual C	World Cup	2nd
28	2006–07	5 January 2007	Asiago, Italy	1.2 km Sprint F	Stage World Cup	1st
28	2006–07	15 February 2007	Changchun, China	1.3 km Sprint C	World Cup	3rd
29	2007–08	15 December 2007	Rybinsk, Russia	30 km Mass Start F	World Cup	1st
30	2007–08	30 December 2007	Prague, Czech Republic	1.0 km Sprint F	Stage World Cup	3rd
31	2007–08	4 January 2008	Asiago, Italy	1.2 km Sprint F	Stage World Cup	3rd
32	2008–09	29 November 2008	Rukatunturi, Finland	1.4 km Sprint C	World Cup	2nd
33	2008–09	20 December 2008	Düsseldorf, Germany	1.5 km Sprint F	World Cup	2nd
34	2008–09	29 December 2008	Prague, Czech Republic	1.3 km Sprint F	Stage World Cup	1st
35	2008–09	20 December 2008	Nové Město, Czech Republic	1.2 km Sprint F	Stage World Cup	2nd

==== Team podiums ====
- 12 victories – (8 RL, 4 TS)
- 24 podiums – (15 RL, 9 TS)

No.	Season	Date	Location	Race	Level	Place	Teammate(s)
1	1995–96	17 March 1996	Oslo, Norway	4 × 5 km Relay F	World Cup	1st	Bjonviken / Estil / Andersen
2	1997–98	10 March 1998	Falun, Sweden	10 × 1.6 km Team Sprint F	World Cup	2nd	Torseth
3	1998–99	29 November 1998	Muonio, Finland	4 × 10 km Relay F	World Cup	2nd	Bjørndalen / Skjeldal / Dæhlie
4	1998–99	20 December 1998	Davos, Switzerland	4 × 10 km Relay C/F	World Cup	1st	Bjervig / Jevne / Dæhlie
5	1998–99	10 January 1999	Nové Město, Czech Republic	4 × 10 km Relay C/F	World Cup	3rd	Hjelmeset / Jevne / Jermstad
6	1999–00	28 November 1999	Kiruna, Sweden	4 × 10 km Relay F	World Cup	2nd	Bjervig / Skjeldal / Alsgaard
7	2000–01	26 November 2000	Beitostølen, Norway	4 × 10 km Relay C/F	World Cup	1st	Bjonviken / Hjelmeset / Skjeldal
8	2000–01	9 December 2000	Santa Caterina, Italy	4 × 5 km Relay C/F	World Cup	1st	Estil / Skjeldal / Alsgaard
9	2001–02	27 November 2001	Kuopio, Finland	4 × 10 km Relay C/F	World Cup	1st	Hjelmeset / Jevne / Bjerkeli
10	2001–02	16 December 2001	Davos, Switzerland	4 × 10 km Relay C/F	World Cup	3rd	Estil / Jevne / Alsgaard
11	2002–03	24 November 2002	Kiruna, Sweden	4 × 10 km Relay C/F	World Cup	2nd	Skjeldal / Aukland / Alsgaard
12	2003–04	26 October 2003	Düsseldorf, Germany	6 × 1.5 km Team Sprint F	World Cup	3rd	Bjerkeli
13	2003–04	7 December 2003	Toblach, Italy	6 × 1.2 km Team Sprint F	World Cup	1st	Bjerkeli
14	2003–04	14 December 2003	Davos, Switzerland	4 × 10 km Relay C/F	World Cup	1st	Aukland / Estil / Skjeldal
15	2004–05	24 October 2004	Düsseldorf, Germany	6 × 1.5 km Team Sprint F	World Cup	1st	Bjerkeli
16	2004–05	5 December 2004	Bern, Switzerland	6 × 1.1 km Team Sprint F	World Cup	2nd	Svartedal
17	2004–05	15 December 2004	Asiago, Italy	6 × 1.2 km Team Sprint C	World Cup	1st	Svartedal
18	2005–06	23 October 2005	Düsseldorf, Germany	6 × 1.5 km Team Sprint F	World Cup	3rd	Rønning
19	2005–06	20 November 2005	Beitostølen, Norway	4 × 10 km Relay C/F	World Cup	3rd	Rønning / Svartedal / Hofstad
20	2006–07	17 December 2006	La Clusaz, France	4 × 10 km Relay C/F	World Cup	2nd	Rønning / Bjørndalen / Northug
21	2007–08	28 October 2007	Düsseldorf, Germany	6 × 1.5 km Team Sprint F	World Cup	2nd	Kjølstad
22	2007–08	25 November 2007	Beitostølen, Norway	4 × 10 km Relay C/F	World Cup	1st	Sundby / Svartedal / Hofstad
23	2008–09	7 December 2008	La Clusaz, France	4 × 10 km Relay C/F	World Cup	1st	Sundby / Gjerdalen / Northug
24	2008–09	21 December 2008	Düsseldorf, Germany	6 × 1.5 km Team Sprint F	World Cup	1st	Hattestad
