= Robin Bryntesson =

Swedish cross-country skier

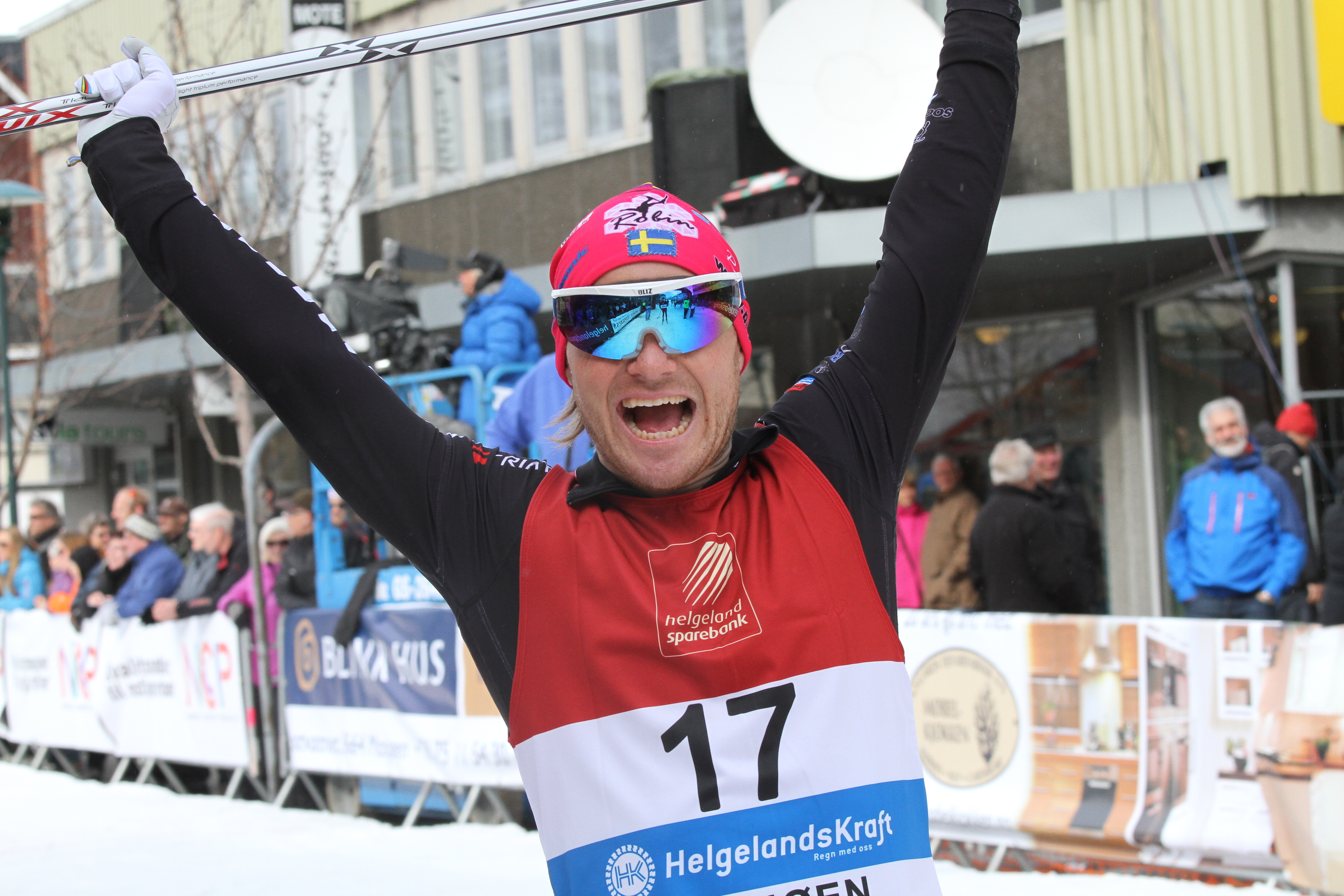
- Bryntesson in April, 2013

Personal information
- Full name: Kjell Magnus Robin Bryntesson
- Nationality: Sweden
- Born: 17 October 1985 (age 40) Rossön, Ångermanland, Sweden
- Height: 174 cm (5 ft 9 in)

Sport
- Sport: Skiing
- Club: Sollefteå Skidor IF

World Cup career
- Seasons: 10 – (2004, 2006–2014)
- Indiv. starts: 44
- Indiv. podiums: 0
- Team starts: 7
- Team podiums: 2
- Team wins: 1
- Overall titles: 0 – (61st in 2008)
- Discipline titles: 0
Medal record
Men's cross-country skiing
Representing Sweden
U23 World Championships
Gold medal – first place	2007 Tarvisio	Individual sprint
Gold medal – first place	2008 Mals	Individual sprint
Junior World Championships
Gold medal – first place	2004 Stryn	Individual sprint
Paralympic Games
Silver medal – second place	2018 Pyeongchang	1.5km sprint classical

Kjell Magnus Robin Bryntesson (born 17 October 1985 in Rossön, Ångermanland) is a Swedish cross-country skier who has been competing since 2003. His only World Cup victory took place at Whistler Olympic Park in the team sprint event on 17 January 2009.

Bryntesson also won seven FIS Races during his career since 2007.

Bryntesson won a silver medal as the sighted guide for Zebastian Modin at the 2018 Winter Paralympics in Pyeongchang.

== Cross-country skiing results ==
All results are sourced from the International Ski Federation (FIS).

=== World Cup ===
==== Season standings ====
Season	Age	Discipline standings			Ski Tour standings		
Season	Age	Overall	Distance	Sprint	Nordic Opening	Tour de Ski	World Cup Final
2004	18	NC	—	NC	—N/a	—N/a	—N/a
2006	20	147	NC	65	—N/a	—N/a	—N/a
2007	21	118	—	56	—N/a	—	—N/a
2008	22	61	—	24	—N/a	—	—
2009	23	104	—	56	—N/a	—	—
2010	24	95	—	46	—N/a	—	—
2011	25	76	—	36	—	—	—
2012	26	71	—	32	—	—	—
2013	27	111	—	61	—	—	—
2014	28	149	—	92	—	—	—

==== Team podiums ====
- 1 victory – (1 TS)
- 2 podiums – (2 TS)

No.	Season	Date	Location	Race	Level	Place	Teammate
1	2008–09	18 January 2009	Whistler, Canada	6 × 1.6 km Team Sprint F	World Cup	1st	Jönsson
2	2009–10	6 December 2009	Düsseldorf, Germany	6 × 1.5 km Team Sprint F	World Cup	3rd	Lind
