= Guro Strøm Solli =

Norwegian cross-country skier

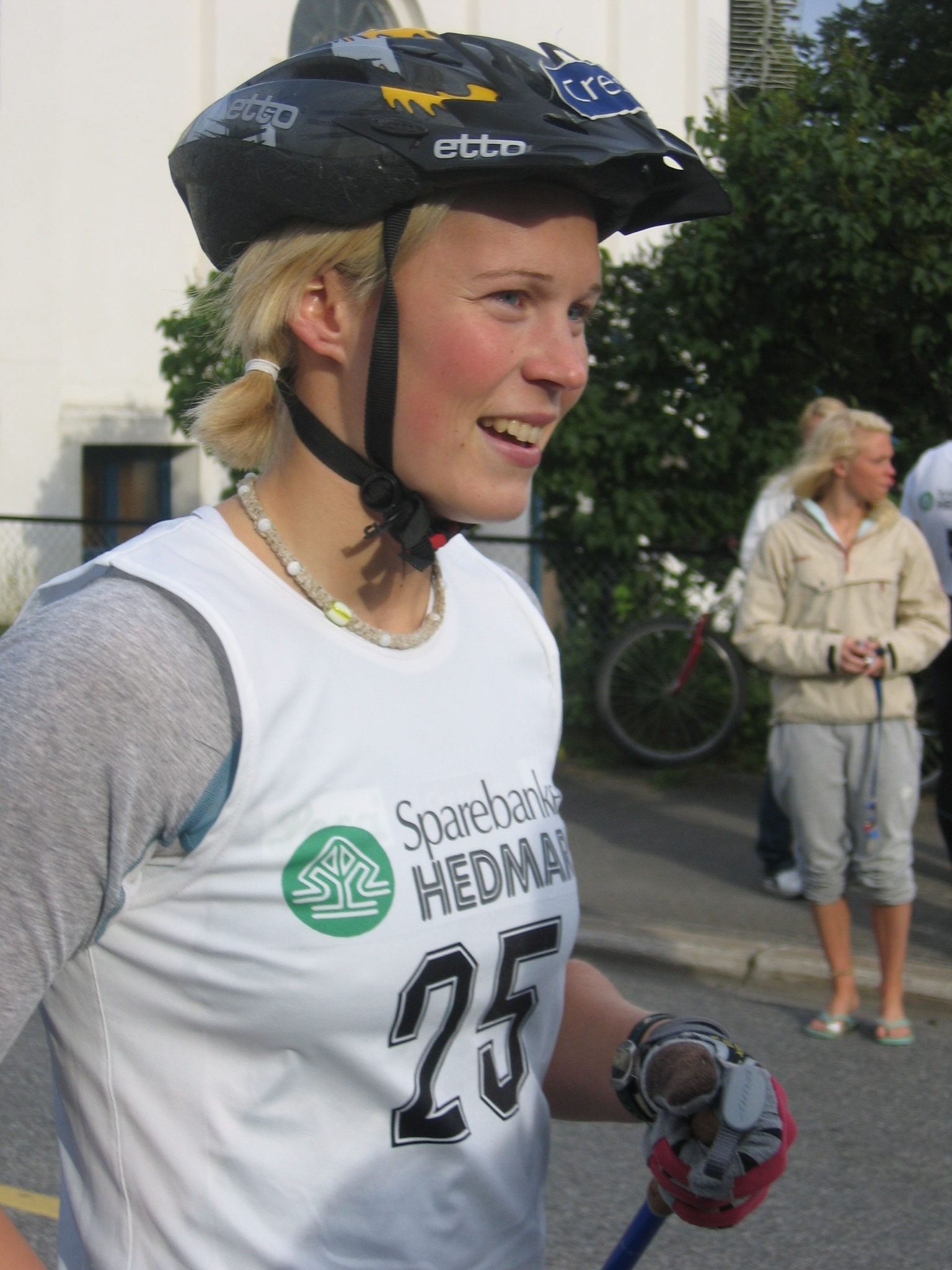
- Guro Strøm Solli

Personal information
- Nationality: Norway
- Born: 29 July 1983 (age 42) Bodø, Norway

Sport
- Sport: Skiing
- Club: Drevja IL

World Cup career
- Seasons: 6 – (2004–2008, 2010)
- Indiv. starts: 35
- Indiv. podiums: 2
- Indiv. wins: 0
- Team starts: 4
- Team podiums: 1
- Team wins: 0
- Overall titles: 0 – (32nd in 2007)
- Discipline titles: 0
Medal record
Women's cross-country skiing
Representing Norway
U23 World Championships
Gold medal – first place	2006 Kranj	Individual sprint

Guro Strøm Solli (born July 29, 1983) is a Norwegian cross-country skier who has competed since 2003. Her best World Cup finish was second in a team sprint event in Germany in 2005. Solli finished tenth in the sprint event at the FIS Nordic World Ski Championships 2005 in Oberstdorf.

A classical 300-meter rollerski race was on the agenda at the Norwegian national team’s training camp in Klekken/Hønefoss. The event was held Thursday night and 2000 spectators showed up for the downtown race despite bad weather. The race included qualification heat, semifinal and finale. Solli won the women’s event ahead of Marit Bjørgen and Ella Gjømle Berg.

== Cross-country skiing results ==
All results are sourced from the International Ski Federation (FIS).

=== World Championships ===
Year	Age	10 km individual	15 km skiathlon	30 km mass start	Sprint	4 × 5 km relay	Team sprint
2005	21	—	—	—	10	—	—

=== World Cup ===
==== Season standings ====
Season	Age	Discipline standings			Ski Tour standings	
Season	Age	Overall	Distance	Sprint	Tour de Ski	World Cup Final
2004	20	101	—	62	—N/a	—N/a
2005	21	35	—	15	—N/a	—N/a
2006	22	33	NC	15	—N/a	—N/a
2007	23	32	—	15	—	—N/a
2008	24	NC	—	NC	—	—
2010	26	NC	—	NC	—	—

==== Individual podiums ====
- 2 podiums

No.	Season	Date	Location	Race	Level	Place
1	2005–06	22 January 2006	Oberstdorf, Germany	0.9 km Sprint C	World Cup	3rd
2	2006–07	15 February 2007	Changchun, China	1.1 km Sprint C	World Cup	3rd

==== Team podiums ====
- 1 podium – (1 TS)

No.	Season	Date	Location	Race	Level	Place	Teammate
1	2005–06	23 October 2005	Düsseldorf, Germany	6 × 0.8 km Team Sprint F	World Cup	2nd	Berg
