= Martin Larsson (skier) =

Swedish cross-country skier (born 1979)

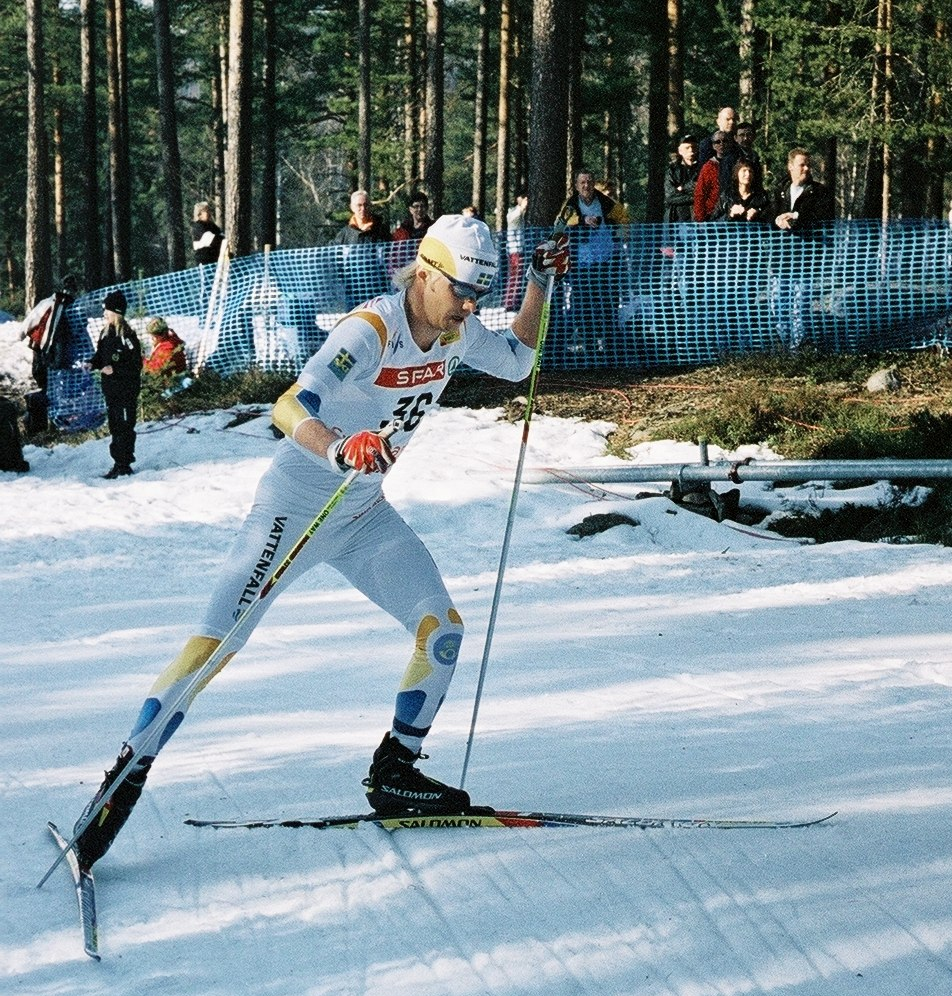

Personal information
- Nationality: Sweden
- Born: March 27, 1979 (age 47) Arvika, Sweden

Sport
- Sport: Skiing
- Club: Arvika IS

World Cup career
- Seasons: 10 – (2000–2009)
- Indiv. starts: 26
- Indiv. podiums: 0
- Team starts: 13
- Team podiums: 1
- Team wins: 0
- Overall titles: 0 – (64th in 2007)
- Discipline titles: 0
Medal record
Men's cross-country skiing
Representing Sweden
World Championships
Bronze medal – third place	2007 Sapporo	4 × 10 km relay

Martin Larsson (born March 27, 1979) is a Swedish cross-country skier who competed between 1999 and 2011. He won a bronze medal in the 4 × 10 km relay at the 2007 FIS Nordic World Ski Championships in Sapporo and finished 79th in the 15 km event at those same championships.

Larsson has a total of five victories at various levels at distances up to 15 km since 2002.

== Cross-country skiing results ==
All results are sourced from the International Ski Federation (FIS).

=== World Championships ===
- 1 medal – (1 bronze)

Year	Age	15 km individual	30 km skiathlon	50 km mass start	Sprint	4 × 10 km relay	Team sprint
2007	27	75	—	17	—	Bronze	—

=== World Cup ===
==== Season standings ====
Season	Age	Discipline standings					Ski Tour standings	
Season	Age	Overall	Distance	Long Distance	Middle Distance	Sprint	Tour de Ski	World Cup Final
2000	20	NC	—N/a	—	NC	NC	—N/a	—N/a
2001	21	NC	—N/a	—N/a	—N/a	—	—N/a	—N/a
2002	22	NC	—N/a	—N/a	—N/a	NC	—N/a	—N/a
2003	23	NC	—N/a	—N/a	—N/a	—	—N/a	—N/a
2004	24	121	81	—N/a	—N/a	NC	—N/a	—N/a
2005	25	NC	NC	—N/a	—N/a	—	—N/a	—N/a
2006	26	134	95	—N/a	—N/a	NC	—N/a	—N/a
2007	27	64	39	—N/a	—N/a	NC	—	—N/a
2008	28	NC	NC	—N/a	—N/a	—	—	—
2009	29	NC	NC	—N/a	—N/a	—	—	—

==== Team podiums ====
- 1 podium (1 RL)

No.	Season	Date	Location	Race	Level	Place	Teammates
1	2003–04	14 December 2003	Davos, Switzerland	4 × 10 km Relay C/F	World Cup	3rd	Larsson / Olsson / Högberg
