= Håvard Bjerkeli =

Norwegian cross-country skier

Personal information
- Nationality: Norway
- Born: August 5, 1977 (age 49) Molde, Norway

Sport
- Sport: Skiing
- Club: Isfjorden IL

World Cup career
- Seasons: 8 – (1999–2006)
- Indiv. starts: 61
- Indiv. podiums: 5
- Indiv. wins: 3
- Team starts: 9
- Team podiums: 4
- Team wins: 2
- Overall titles: 0 – (18th in 2004)
- Discipline titles: 0
Medal record
Men's cross-country skiing
Representing Norway
World Championships
Silver medal – second place	2003 Val di Fiemme	Individual sprint

Håvard Bjerkeli (born August 5, 1977) is a Norwegian cross-country skier who competed between 1996 and 2006. He won a silver medal in the individual sprint at the 2003 FIS Nordic World Ski Championships in Val di Fiemme.

Bjerkeli also finished 13th in the individual sprint at the 2002 Winter Olympics in Salt Lake City. He also has fifteen individual victories from 1999 to 2004.

== Cross-country skiing results ==
All results are sourced from the International Ski Federation (FIS).

=== Olympic Games ===
Year	Age	15 km	Pursuit	30 km	50 km	Sprint	4 × 10 km relay
2002	24	—	—	—	—	13	—

=== World Championships ===
- 1 medal – (1 silver)

Year	Age	15 km	Pursuit	30 km	50 km	Sprint	4 × 10 km relay
2003	25	—	—	—	30	Silver	—

=== World Cup ===
==== Season standings ====
Season	Age					
Season	Age	Overall	Distance	Long Distance	Middle Distance	Sprint
1999	21	60	—N/a	NC	—N/a	24
2000	22	37	—N/a	NC	NC	6
2001	23	36	—N/a	—N/a	—N/a	7
2002	24	18	—N/a	—N/a	—N/a	5
2003	25	27	—N/a	—N/a	—N/a	6
2004	26	18	NC	—N/a	—N/a	3rd place, bronze medalist(s)
2005	27	89	—	—N/a	—N/a	43
2006	28	73	—	—N/a	—N/a	29

==== Individual podiums ====
- 3 victories
- 5 podiums

No.	Season	Date	Location	Race	Level	Place
1	1999–00	29 December 1999	Kitzbühel, Austria	1.0 km Sprint F	World Cup	3rd
2	2001–02	29 December 2001	Salzburg, Austria	1.5 km Sprint C	World Cup	1st
3	2002–03	6 March 2003	Oslo, Norway	1.5 km Sprint C	World Cup	1st
4	2003–04	18 January 2004	Nové Město, Czech Republic	1.2 km Sprint F	World Cup	3rd
5	2003–04	26 February 2004	Drammen, Norway	1.2 km Sprint C	World Cup	1st

==== Team podiums ====
- 3 victories – (1 RL, 2 TS)
- 4 podiums – (1 RL, 3 TS)

No.	Season	Date	Location	Race	Level	Place	Teammate(s)
1	2001–02	27 November 2001	Kuopio, Finland	4 × 10 km Relay C/F	World Cup	1st	Hjelmeset / Jevne / Hetland
2	2003–04	26 October 2003	Düsseldorf, Germany	6 × 1.5 km Team Sprint F	World Cup	3rd	Hetland
3	2003–04	7 December 2003	Toblach, Italy	6 × 1.2 km Team Sprint F	World Cup	1st	Hetland
4	2004–05	24 October 2004	Düsseldorf, Germany	6 × 1.5 km Team Sprint F	World Cup	1st	Hetland
