= Peter Larsson (cross-country skier) =

Swedish cross-country skier

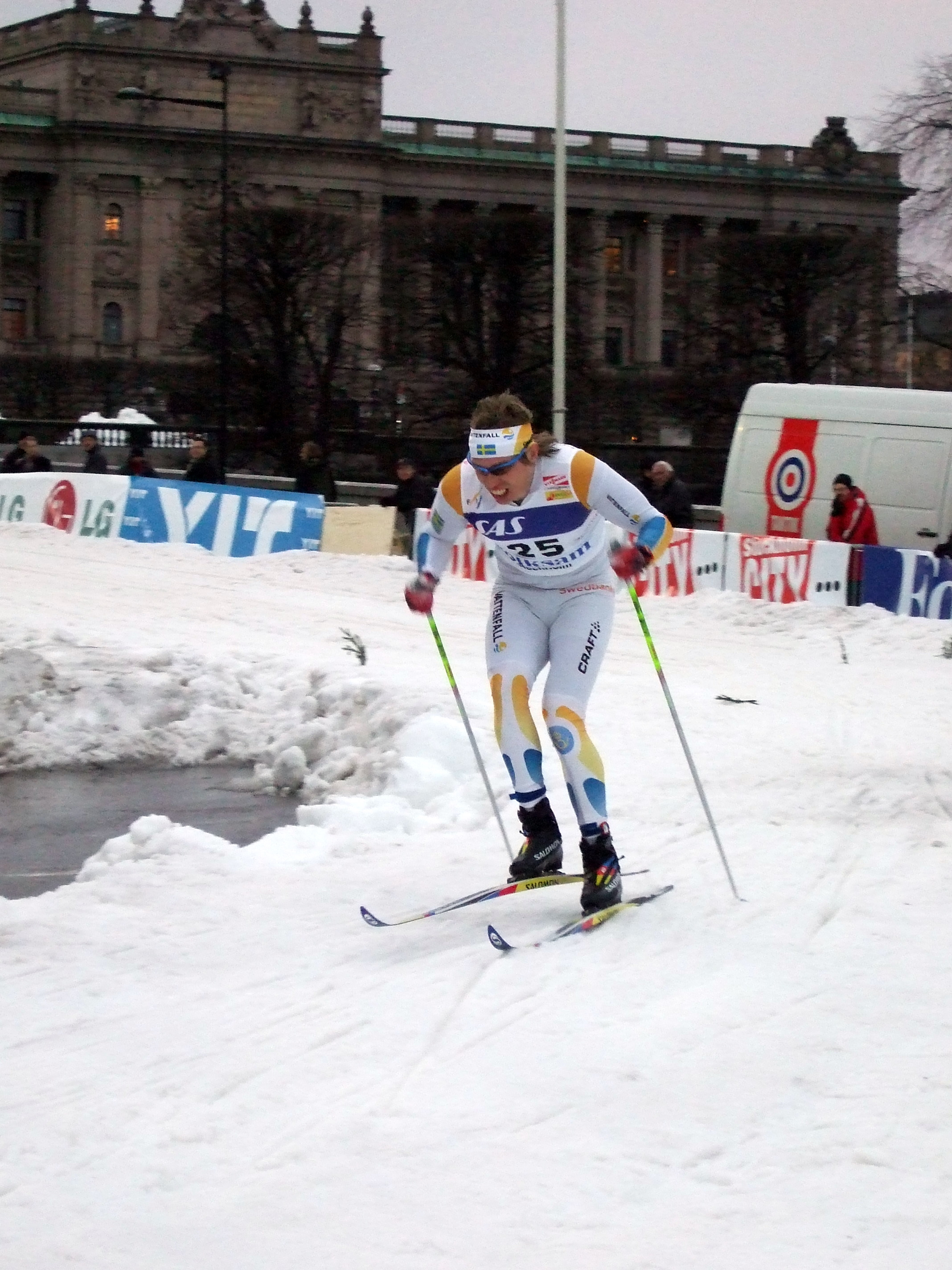

Personal information
- Full name: Peter Mathias Larsson
- Nationality: Sweden
- Born: 10 November 1978 Luleå, Sweden

Sport
- Sport: Skiing
- Club: Hudiksvalls IF

World Cup career
- Seasons: 10 – (2000–2009)
- Indiv. starts: 53
- Indiv. podiums: 9
- Indiv. wins: 4
- Team starts: 14
- Team podiums: 4
- Team wins: 3
- Overall titles: 0 – (12th in 2006)
- Discipline titles: 0
- Updated on 4 April 2019

Peter Larsson (born 10 November 1978 in Luleå, Norrbotten) is a Swedish cross-country skier who has competed since 2000. He has six World Cup victories from 2002 to 2007, all in sprint events.

At the 2006 Winter Olympics in Turin, Larsson finished 13th in the sprint event. He finished 17th in the sprint event at the FIS Nordic World Ski Championships 2003 in Val di Fiemme.

== Cross-country skiing results ==
All results are sourced from the International Ski Federation (FIS).

=== Olympic Games ===
Year	Age	15 km	Pursuit	30 km	50 km	Sprint	4 × 10 km relay	Team sprint
2002	23	—	—	—	—	DSQ	—	—N/a
2006	27	—	—	—N/a	—	13	—	—

=== World Championships ===
Year	Age	15 km	Pursuit	30 km	50 km	Sprint	4 × 10 km relay	Team sprint
2003	24	—	—	—	—	17	—	—N/a
2007	28	—	—	—N/a	—	—	—	DNF

=== World Cup ===
==== Season standings ====
Season	Age	Discipline standings					Ski Tour standings	
Season	Age	Overall	Distance	Long distance	Middle distance	Sprint	Tour de Ski	World Cup Final
2000	21	NC	—N/a	—	—	NC	—N/a	—N/a
2001	22	NC	—N/a	—N/a	—N/a	NC	—N/a	—N/a
2002	23	45	—N/a	—N/a	—N/a	16	—N/a	—N/a
2003	24	21	—N/a	—N/a	—N/a	7	—N/a	—N/a
2004	25	21	NC	—N/a	—N/a	5	—N/a	—N/a
2005	26	37	—	—N/a	—N/a	16	—N/a	—N/a
2006	27	12	NC	—N/a	—N/a	4	—N/a	—N/a
2007	28	90	NC	—N/a	—N/a	43	62	—N/a
2008	29	116	—	—N/a	—N/a	79	—	—
2009	30	152	—	—N/a	—N/a	89	—	—

==== Individual podiums ====
- 4 victories – (4 WC)
- 9 podiums – (9 WC)

No.	Season	Date	Location	Race	Level	Place
1	2001–02	27 December 2001	Garmisch-Partenkirchen, Germany	1.5 km sprint F	World Cup	3rd
2	2002–03	26 October 2002	Düsseldorf, Germany	1.5 km sprint F	World Cup	1st
3	2002–03	20 March 2003	Borlänge, Sweden	1.0 km sprint F	World Cup	2nd
4	2003–04	25 October 2003	Düsseldorf, Germany	2.0 km sprint F	World Cup	1st
5	2003–04	18 January 2004	Nové Město, Czech Republic	1.2 km sprint F	World Cup	2nd
6	2004–05	23 October 2004	Düsseldorf, Germany	1.5 km sprint F	World Cup	1st
7	2005–06	22 October 2005	Düsseldorf, Germany	1.5 km sprint F	World Cup	1st
8	2005–06	30 December 2005	Nové Město, Czech Republic	1.2 km sprint F	World Cup	2nd
9	2005–06	7 March 2006	Borlänge, Sweden	1.5 km sprint F	World Cup	2nd

==== Team podiums ====
- 3 victories – (3 TS)
- 4 podiums – (4 TS)

No.	Season	Date	Location	Race	Level	Place	Teammate
1	2003–04	26 October 2003	Düsseldorf, Germany	6 × 1.5 km team sprint F	World Cup	1st	Fredriksson
2	2003–04	12 December 2003	Toblach, Italy	6 × 1.2 km team sprint F	World Cup	2nd	Fredriksson
3	2006–07	29 October 2006	Düsseldorf, Germany	6 × 1.5 km team sprint F	World Cup	1st	Lind
4	2007–08	28 October 2007	Düsseldorf, Germany	6 × 1.5 km team sprint F	World Cup	1st	Fredriksson
