= Mikael Östberg =

Swedish cross-country skier

Personal information
- Nationality: Sweden
- Born: 21 May 1977 (age 49) Stockholm, Sweden

Sport
- Sport: Skiing
- Club: Falun-Borlänge SK

World Cup career
- Seasons: 10 – (1998, 2000–2008)
- Indiv. starts: 54
- Indiv. podiums: 2
- Indiv. wins: 1
- Team starts: 17
- Team podiums: 1
- Team wins: 0
- Overall titles: 0 – (31st in 2003, 2005, 2006)
- Discipline titles: 0

Mikael Östberg (born 21 May 1977) is a Swedish cross-country skier. He competed in the men's sprint event at the 2006 Winter Olympics.

== Cross-country skiing results ==
All results are sourced from the International Ski Federation (FIS).

=== Olympic Games ===
Year	Age	15 km individual	30 km skiathlon	50 km mass start	Sprint	4 × 10 km relay	Team sprint
2006	28	—	—	—	12	—	—

=== World Championships ===
Year	Age	15 km	Pursuit	30 km	50 km	Sprint	4 × 10 km relay
2003	25	—	—	—	—	9	—

=== World Cup ===
==== Season standings ====
Season	Age	Discipline standings					Ski Tour standings	
Season	Age	Overall	Distance	Long Distance	Middle Distance	Sprint	Tour de Ski	World Cup Final
1998	20	NC	—N/a	NC	—N/a	—	—N/a	—N/a
2000	22	74	—N/a	—	NC	39	—N/a	—N/a
2001	23	100	—N/a	—N/a	—N/a	58	—N/a	—N/a
2002	24	58	—N/a	—N/a	—N/a	24	—N/a	—N/a
2003	25	31	—N/a	—N/a	—N/a	9	—N/a	—N/a
2004	26	39	NC	—N/a	—N/a	14	—N/a	—N/a
2005	27	31	NC	—N/a	—N/a	12	—N/a	—N/a
2006	28	31	—	—N/a	—N/a	13	—N/a	—N/a
2007	29	121	—	—N/a	—N/a	57	—	—N/a
2008	30	109	—	—N/a	—N/a	72	—	—

==== Individual podiums ====
- 1 victory – (1 WC)
- 2 podiums – (2 WC)

No.	Season	Date	Location	Race	Level	Place
1	2002–03	19 December 2002	Linz, Austria	1.0 km Sprint F	World Cup	1st
2	2003–04	5 March 2004	Lahti, Finland	1.0 km Sprint F	World Cup	3rd

==== Team podiums ====
- 1 podium – (1 TS)

No.	Season	Date	Location	Race	Level	Place	Teammate
1	2005–06	18 December 2005	Canmore, Canada	6 × 1.2 km Team Sprint C	World Cup	3rd	Larsson
