= Anders Aukland =

Norwegian cross-country skier

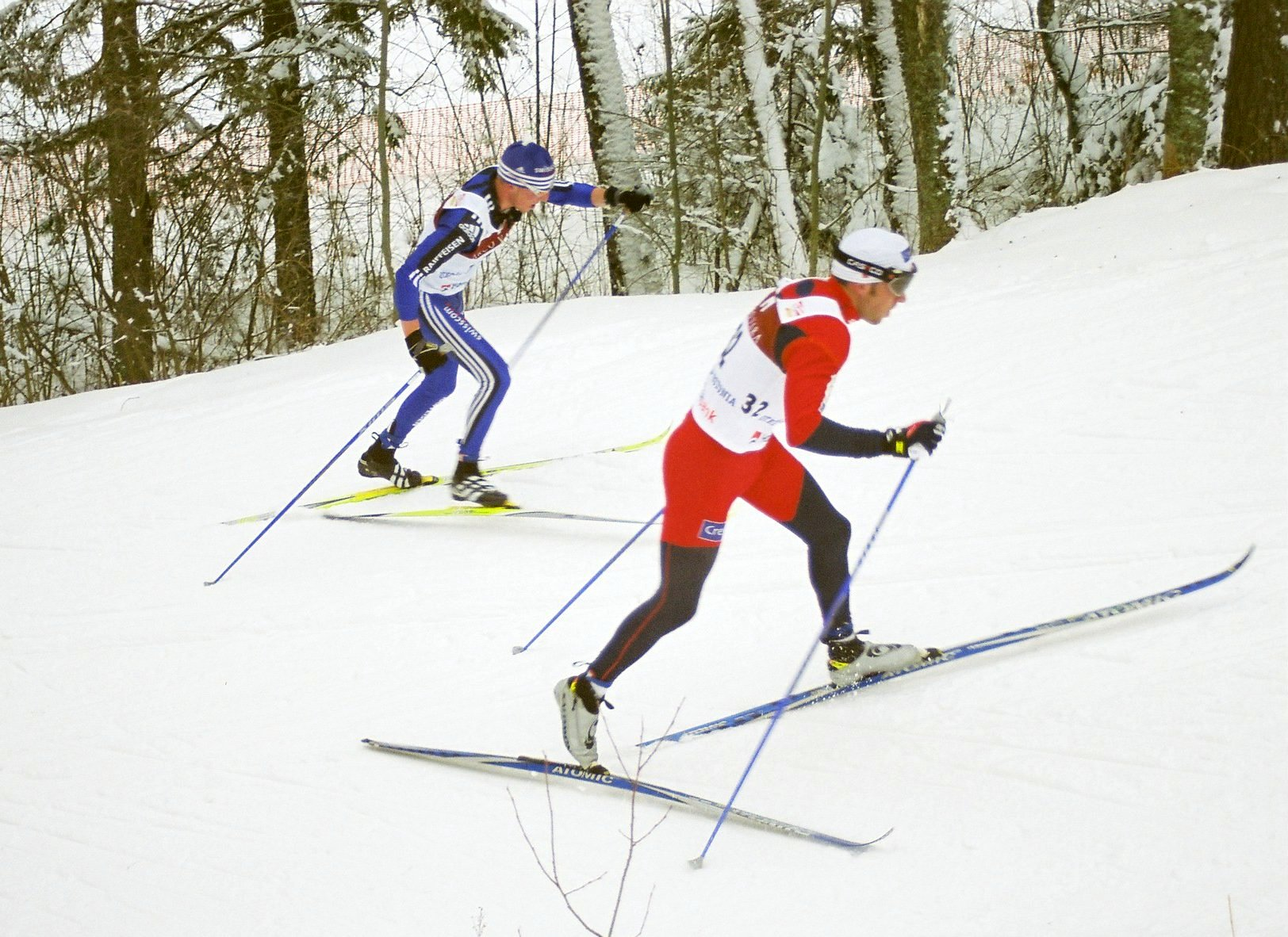
- Anders Aukland (in red)

Personal information
- Nationality: Norway
- Born: 12 September 1972 (age 53) Tønsberg, Norway

Sport
- Sport: Skiing
- Club: Oseberg SL

World Cup career
- Seasons: 18 – (1993–2007, 2009–2010, 2012)
- Indiv. starts: 94
- Indiv. podiums: 13
- Indiv. wins: 6
- Team starts: 20
- Team podiums: 5
- Team wins: 4
- Overall titles: 0 – (3rd in 2002)
- Discipline titles: 0
Medal record
Men's cross-country skiing
Representing Norway
Olympic Games
Gold medal – first place	2002 Salt Lake City	4 × 10 km relay
World Championships
Gold medal – first place	2003 Val di Fiemme	4 × 10 km relay
Silver medal – second place	2003 Val di Fiemme	30 km classical
Silver medal – second place	2005 Oberstdorf	50 km classical

Anders Aukland (born 12 September 1972 in Tønsberg) is a retired professional Norwegian cross-country skier who won both Olympic and World Championship gold medals. He lives in Oslo. He competed in the last race of his career on April 2, 2023.

Aukland also used to compete in athletics, and is a former national champion in 5000 meters (1995) and 10,000 metres (1996 and 1997) as well as cross-country running. He has represented Tønsberg FIK and IK Tjalve. In his only international athletics competition he finished seventh in 5000 m at the 1991 European Junior Championships.

Aukland received the Egebergs Ærespris in 2001.

On 7 March 2004, Aukland won the Vasaloppet in Sweden, becoming the second Norwegian to accomplish this feat after 1971 winner Ole Ellefsæter. Aukland's brother Jørgen finished 3rd in that event. In 2010 Anders won the 54 km Birkebeinerrennet. In 2008 he won Marcialonga.

He has his education from the Norwegian School of Sport Sciences.

== Cross-country skiing results ==
All results are sourced from the International Ski Federation (FIS).

=== Olympic Games ===
- 1 medal – (1 gold)

Year	Age	15 km	Pursuit	30 km	50 km	Sprint	4 × 10 km relay	Team sprint
2002	29	4	7	—	7	—	Gold	—N/a
2006	33	20	28	—N/a	—	—	—	—

=== World Championships ===
- 3 medals – (1 gold, 2 silver)

Year	Age	15 km	Pursuit	30 km	50 km	Sprint	4 × 10 km relay	Team sprint
2001	28	7	9	—	—	—	—	—N/a
2003	30	—	—	Silver	—	—	Gold	—N/a
2005	32	—	—	—N/a	Silver	—	—	—
2007	34	—	—	—N/a	16	—	—	—

=== World Cup ===
==== Season standings ====
Season	Age	Discipline standings					Ski Tour standings		
Season	Age	Overall	Distance	Long Distance	Middle Distance	Sprint	Nordic Opening	Tour de Ski	World Cup Final
1993	20	77	—N/a	—N/a	—N/a	—N/a	—N/a	—N/a	—N/a
1994	21	NC	—N/a	—N/a	—N/a	—N/a	—N/a	—N/a	—N/a
1995	22	66	—N/a	—N/a	—N/a	—N/a	—N/a	—N/a	—N/a
1996	23	49	—N/a	—N/a	—N/a	—N/a	—N/a	—N/a	—N/a
1997	24	72	—N/a	46	—N/a	71	—N/a	—N/a	—N/a
1998	25	33	—N/a	22	—N/a	42	—N/a	—N/a	—N/a
1999	26	51	—N/a	50	—N/a	—	—N/a	—N/a	—N/a
2000	27	51	—N/a	36	42	68	—N/a	—N/a	—N/a
2001	28	22	—N/a	—N/a	—N/a	51	—N/a	—N/a	—N/a
2002	29	3rd place, bronze medalist(s)	—N/a	—N/a	—N/a	44	—N/a	—N/a	—N/a
2003	30	10	—N/a	—N/a	—N/a	76	—N/a	—N/a	—N/a
2004	31	13	11	—N/a	—N/a	NC	—N/a	—N/a	—N/a
2005	32	143	90	—N/a	—N/a	—	—N/a	—N/a	—N/a
2006	33	50	33	—N/a	—N/a	—	—N/a	—N/a	—N/a
2007	34	98	58	—N/a	—N/a	—	—N/a	—	—N/a
2009	36	87	54	—N/a	—N/a	—	—N/a	—	—
2010	37	138	87	—N/a	—N/a	—	—N/a	—	—
2012	39	NC	NC	—N/a	—N/a	—	—	—	—

==== Individual podiums ====
- 6 victories (6 WC)
- 13 podiums (13 WC)

No.	Season	Date	Location	Race	Level	Place
1	2000–01	10 March 2001	Oslo, Norway	50 km Individual C	World Cup	2nd
2	2001–02	24 November 2001	Kuopio, Finland	15 km Individual C	World Cup	1st
3	2001–02	8 December 2001	Cogne, Italy	10 km Individual C	World Cup	1st
4	2001–02	5 January 2002	Val di Fiemme, Italy	10 km + 10 km Pursuit C/F	World Cup	3rd
5	2001–02	8 January 2002	Val di Fiemme, Italy	30 km Mass Start C	World Cup	1st
6	2001–02	23 March 2002	Birkebeinerrennet, Norway	58 km Mass Start C	World Cup	2nd
7	2002–03	14 December 2002	Cogne, Italy	30 km Mass Start C	World Cup	1st
8	2002–03	12 January 2003	Otepää, Estonia	30 km Mass Start C	World Cup	2nd
9	2002–03	8 March 2003	Oslo, Norway	50 km Individual C	World Cup	2nd
10	2003–04	28 November 2003	Rukatunturi, Finland	15 km Individual C	World Cup	1st
11	2003–04	10 January 2003	Otepää, Estonia	30 km Mass Start C	World Cup	2nd
12	2003–04	25 January 2004	Marcialonga, Italy	70 km Mass Start C	World Cup	1st
13	2005–06	5 March 2006	Vasaloppet, Sweden	90 km Mass Start C	World Cup	3rd

==== Team podiums ====
- 4 victories – (4 RL)
- 5 podiums – (5 RL)

No.	Season	Date	Location	Race	Level	Place	Teammates
1	2001–02	10 March 2002	Falun, Sweden	4 × 10 km Relay C/F	World Cup	1st	Estil / Skjeldal / Alsgaard
2	2002–03	24 November 2002	Kiruna, Sweden	4 × 10 km Relay C/F	World Cup	2nd	Skjeldal / Hetland / Alsgaard
3	2002–03	8 December 2002	Davos, Switzerland	4 × 10 km Relay C/F	World Cup	1st	Bjonviken / Hetland / Alsgaard
4	2002–03	19 January 2003	Nové Město, Czech Republic	4 × 10 km Relay C/F	World Cup	1st	Bjonviken / Hetland / Alsgaard
5	2010–11	14 December 2003	Davos, Switzerland	4 × 10 km Relay C/F	World Cup	1st	Estil / Skjeldal / Hetland

Awards
Preceded by Anette Bøe	Egebergs Ærespris; 2001	Succeeded by Ole Einar Bjørndalen
