= Andreas Schlütter =

German cross-country skier

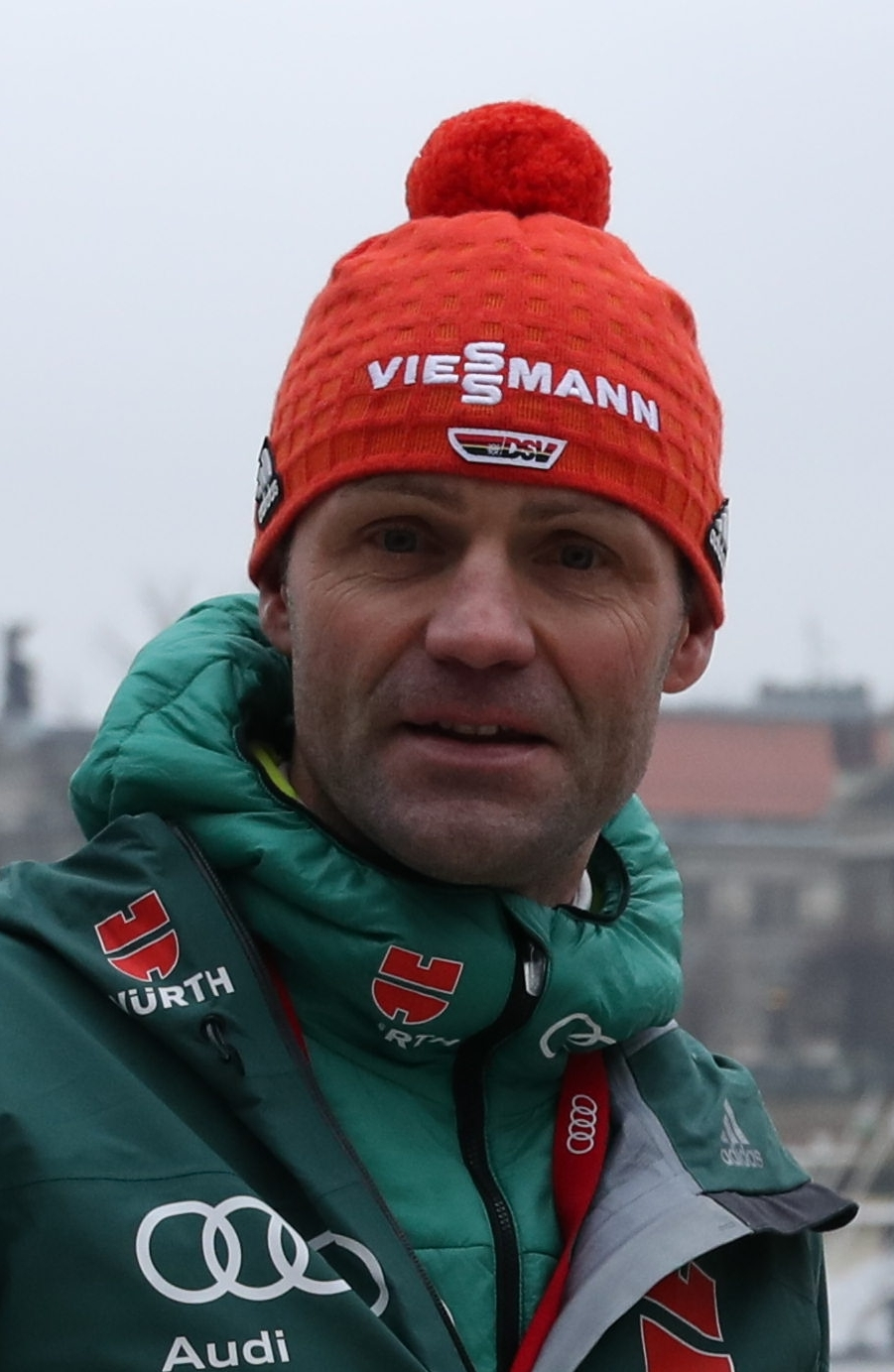
- Schlütter in Dresden, January 2018

Personal information
- Nationality: Germany
- Born: 17 August 1972 (age 54) Suhl, East Germany
- Height: 185 cm (6 ft 1 in)

Sport
- Sport: Skiing
- Club: WSV Oberhof 05

World Cup career
- Seasons: 12 – (1994–1999, 2001–2006)
- Indiv. starts: 145
- Indiv. podiums: 2
- Indiv. wins: 0
- Team starts: 34
- Team podiums: 8
- Team wins: 3
- Overall titles: 0 – (17th in 2002)
- Discipline titles: 0
Medal record
Men's cross-country skiing
Representing Germany
Olympic Games
Silver medal – second place	2006 Turin	4 × 10 km relay
Bronze medal – third place	2002 Salt Lake City	4 × 10 km relay
World Championships
Silver medal – second place	2003 Val di Fiemme	4 × 10 km relay
Silver medal – second place	2005 Oberstdorf	4 × 10 km relay
Bronze medal – third place	2001 Lahti	4 × 10 km relay

Andreas Schlütter (born 17 August 1972) is a German cross-country skier who has been competing since 1993. He won two medals in the 4 × 10 km relay at the Winter Olympics with a silver in 2006 and a bronze in 2002. Schlütter's best individual Olympic finish was fourth in the 50 km event in 2002.

Schlütter also has three 4 × 10 km relay medals at the FIS Nordic World Ski Championships, earning two silvers (2003, 2005) and one bronze (2001). His best individual finishes at the World Championships were in 2003 with fifth-place finishes in the 15 km and 30 km events.

In April 2014, Schlütter was appointed as Sporting Director of cross-country skiing of the German Ski Association.

== Cross-country skiing results ==
All results are sourced from the International Ski Federation (FIS).

=== Olympic Games ===
- 2 medals – (1 silver, 1 bronze)

Year	Age	10 km	15 km	Pursuit	30 km	50 km	Sprint	4 × 10 km relay	Team sprint
1998	25	16	—N/a	12	21	36	—N/a	8	—N/a
2002	29	—N/a	15	17	—	4	—	Bronze	—N/a
2006	33	—N/a	7	—	—N/a	—	—	Silver	4

=== World Championships ===
- 3 medals – (2 silver, 1 bronze)

Year	Age	10 km	15 km	Pursuit	30 km	50 km	Sprint	4 × 10 km relay	Team sprint
1995	22	18	—N/a	29	17	—	—N/a	7	—N/a
1997	24	—	—N/a	—	—	40	—N/a	—	—N/a
1999	26	—	—N/a	—	—	23	—N/a	4	—N/a
2001	28	—N/a	13	16	—	—	—	Bronze	—N/a
2003	30	—N/a	5	—	5	—	—	Silver	—N/a
2005	32	—N/a	—	—	—N/a	10	18	Silver	—

=== World Cup ===
==== Season standings ====
Season	Age	Discipline standings				
Season	Age	Overall	Distance	Long Distance	Middle Distance	Sprint
1994	22	NC	—N/a	—N/a	—N/a	—N/a
1995	23	38	—N/a	—N/a	—N/a	—N/a
1996	24	35	—N/a	—N/a	—N/a	—N/a
1997	25	91	—N/a	64	—N/a	68
1998	26	39	—N/a	43	—N/a	34
1999	27	28	—N/a	26	—N/a	30
2001	29	72	—N/a	—N/a	—N/a	50
2002	30	17	—N/a	—N/a	—N/a	18
2003	31	28	—N/a	—N/a	—N/a	35
2004	32	25	21	—N/a	—N/a	38
2005	33	32	22	—N/a	—N/a	46
2006	34	43	30	—N/a	—N/a	67

==== Individual podiums ====
- 2 podiums

No.	Season	Date	Location	Race	Level	Place
1	2001–02	19 December 2001	Asiago, Italy	1.5 km Sprint C	World Cup	3rd
2	2005–06	20 December 2005	Vernon, Canada	15 km + 15 km Pursuit C/F	World Cup	3rd

==== Team podiums ====
- 3 victories – (3 RL)
- 8 podiums – (7 RL, 1 TS)

No.	Season	Date	Location	Race	Level	Place	Teammate(s)
1	2002–03	24 November 2002	Kiruna, Sweden	4 × 10 km Relay C/F	World Cup	3rd	Teichmann / Angerer / Sommerfeldt
2	2002–03	19 January 2003	Nové Město, Czech Republic	4 x 10 km Relay C/F	World Cup	3rd	Filbrich / Angerer / Stitzl
3	2002–03	23 March 2003	Falun, Sweden	4 × 10 km Relay C/F	World Cup	3rd	Filbrich / Sommerfeldt / Teichmann
4	2003–04	14 December 2003	Davos, Switzerland	4 × 10 km Relay C/F	World Cup	2nd	Filbrich / Sommerfeldt / Angerer
5	2003–04	11 January 2004	Otepää, Estonia	4 × 10 km Relay C/F	World Cup	1st	Filbrich / Teichmann / Angerer
6	2003–04	22 February 2004	Umeå, Sweden	4 × 10 km Relay C/F	World Cup	1st	Göring / Filbrich / Teichmann
7	2004–05	23 January 2005	Pragelato, Italy	6 × 1.2 km Team Sprint C	World Cup	3rd	Sommerfeldt
8	2005–06	20 November 2005	Beitostølen, Norway	4 × 10 km Relay C/F	World Cup	1st	Teichmann / Filbrich / Angerer
