= Mats Larsson =

Swedish cross-country skier

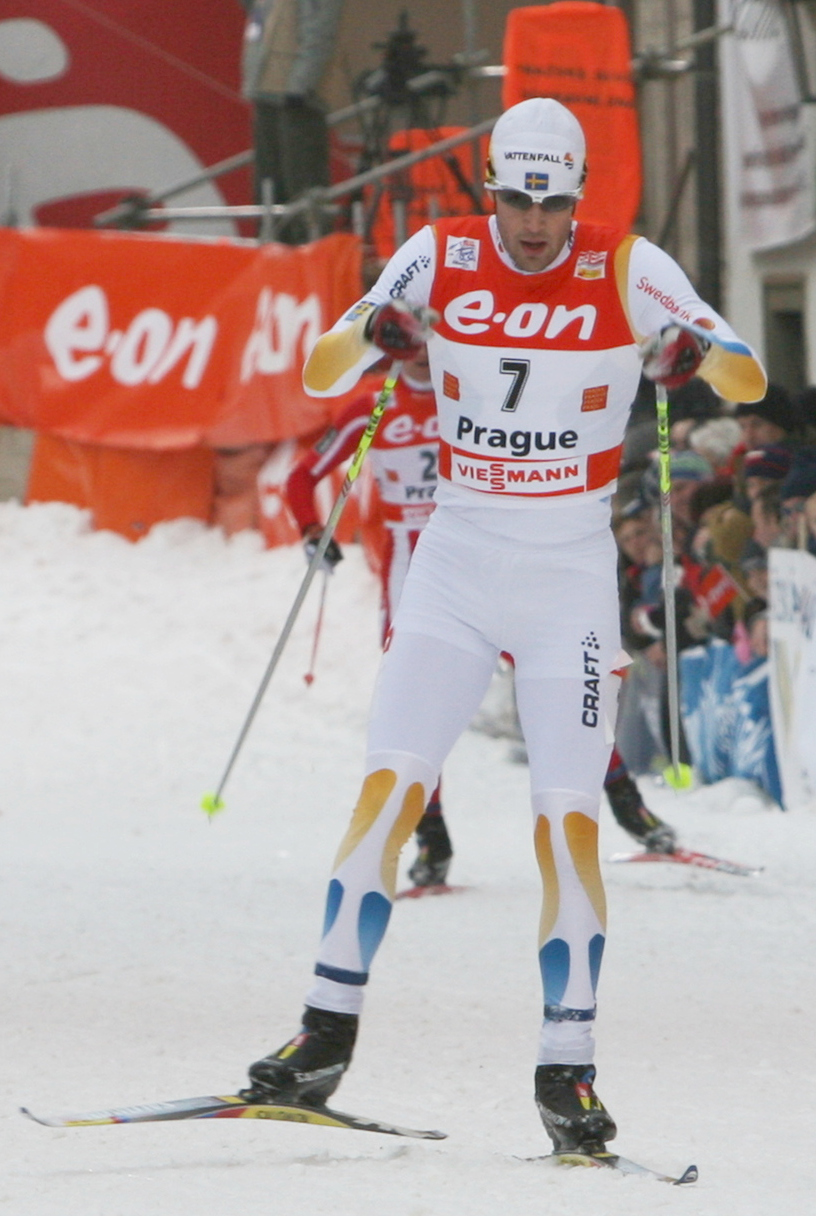
- Larsson during Tour de Ski competitions in Prague, Czech Republic in December 2007

Personal information
- Full name: Ål Mats Arne Larsson
- Nationality: Sweden
- Born: 20 March 1980 (age 46) Järna, Vansbro, Sweden
- Height: 184 cm (6 ft 0 in)

Sport
- Sport: Skiing
- Club: Åsarna IK

World Cup career
- Seasons: 12 – (2000–2011)
- Indiv. starts: 85
- Indiv. podiums: 4
- Indiv. wins: 0
- Team starts: 24
- Team podiums: 7
- Team wins: 1
- Overall titles: 0 – (25th in 2007)
- Discipline titles: 0
Medal record
Men's cross-country skiing
Representing Sweden
Olympic Games
Bronze medal – third place	2006 Turin	4 × 10 km relay
World Championships
Silver medal – second place	2007 Sapporo	Individual sprint
U23 World Championships
Gold medal – first place	2002 Val di Fiemme	15 km skiathlon
Junior World Championships
Silver medal – second place	2000 Štrbské Pleso	4 × 10 km relay

Ål Mats Arne Larsson (born 20 March 1980) is a Swedish cross-country skier who has raced since 1999. He won a bronze medal in the 4 × 10 km relay and finished 20th in the 15 km event at the 2006 Winter Olympics in Turin.

Larsson won a silver medal in the individual sprint event at the 2007 FIS Nordic World Ski Championships in Sapporo. His only career win came in a 15 km event in 2002 in Italy.

In May 2013, he was appointed as a coach for the Swedish national cross-country ski team. His father Gunnar was also an Olympic cross-country skier.

== Cross-country skiing results ==
All results are sourced from the International Ski Federation (FIS).

=== Olympic Games ===
- 1 medal – (1 bronze)

Year	Age	15 km individual	30 km skiathlon	50 km mass start	Sprint	4 × 10 km relay	Team sprint
2006	25	9	—	—	—	Bronze	—

=== World Championships ===
- 1 medal – (1 silver)

Year	Age	15 km individual	30 km skiathlon	50 km mass start	Sprint	4 × 10 km relay	Team sprint
2005	24	62	—	—	6	7	—
2007	26	—	33	—	Silver	—	—
2009	28	—	—	—	—	—	6

=== World Cup ===
==== Season standings ====
Season	Age	Discipline standings					Ski Tour standings		
Season	Age	Overall	Distance	Long Distance	Middle Distance	Sprint	Nordic Opening	Tour de Ski	World Cup Final
2000	20	NC	—N/a	—	NC	—	—N/a	—N/a	—N/a
2001	21	NC	—N/a	—N/a	—N/a	—	—N/a	—N/a	—N/a
2002	22	NC	—N/a	—N/a	—N/a	NC	—N/a	—N/a	—N/a
2003	23	81	—N/a	—N/a	—N/a	—	—N/a	—N/a	—N/a
2004	24	55	51	—N/a	—N/a	33	—N/a	—N/a	—N/a
2005	25	66	NC	—N/a	—N/a	29	—N/a	—N/a	—N/a
2006	26	93	85	—N/a	—N/a	48	—N/a	—N/a	—N/a
2007	27	25	53	—N/a	—N/a	11	—N/a	DNF	—N/a
2008	28	44	57	—N/a	—N/a	20	—N/a	29	—
2009	29	58	56	—N/a	—N/a	37	—N/a	—	55
2010	30	50	53	—N/a	—N/a	33	—N/a	—	19
2011	31	50	93	—N/a	—N/a	17	DNF	—	—

==== Individual podiums ====
- 4 podiums – (3 WC, 1 SWC)

No.	Season	Date	Location	Race	Level	Place
1	2006–07	14 March 2007	Drammen, Norway	1.2 km Sprint C	World Cup	2nd
2	2006–07	21 March 2007	Stockholm, Sweden	1.0 km Sprint C	World Cup	3rd
3	2007–08	1 December 2007	Rukatunturi, Finland	1.2 km Sprint C	World Cup	3rd
4	2009–10	19 March 2010	Falun, Sweden	3.3 km Individual C	Stage World Cup	2nd

==== Team podiums ====
- 1 victory – (1 RL)
- 7 podiums – (4 RL, 3 TS)

No.	Season	Date	Location	Race	Level	Place	Teammate(s)
1	2003–04	14 December 2003	Davos, Switzerland	4 × 10 km Relay C/F	World Cup	3rd	Larsson / Olsson / Högberg
2	2003–04	22 February 2004	Umeå, Sweden	4 × 10 km Relay C/F	World Cup	3rd	Brink / Högberg / Fredriksson
3	2005–06	18 December 2005	Canmore, Canada	6 × 1.2 km Team Sprint C	World Cup	3rd	Östberg
4	2007–08	9 December 2007	Davos, Switzerland	4 × 10 km Relay C/F	World Cup	3rd	Olsson / Södergren / Hellner
5	2010–11	21 November 2010	Gällivare, Sweden	4 × 10 km Relay C/F	World Cup	1st	Olsson / Rickardsson / Hellner
6	2010–11	5 December 2010	Düsseldorf, Germany	6 × 1.6 km Team Sprint F	World Cup	2nd	Jönsson
7	2010–11	16 January 2011	Liberec, Czech Republic	6 × 1.6 km Team Sprint C	World Cup	2nd	Modin

== See also ==
- List of Olympic medalist families
