= Thobias Fredriksson =

Swedish cross-country skier

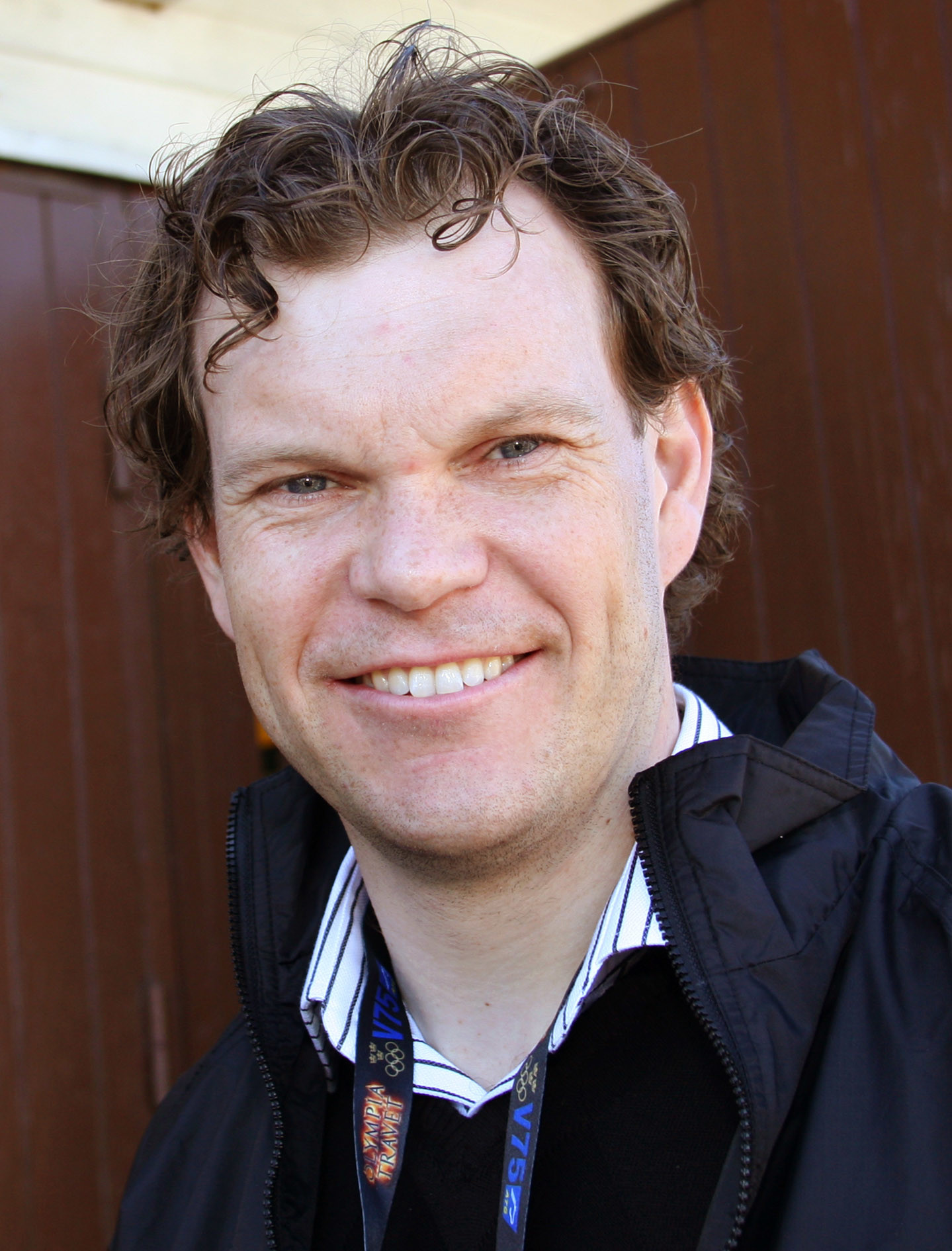
- Thobias Fredriksson in March 2010

Personal information
- Full name: Karl Daniel Thobias Fredriksson
- Nationality: Sweden
- Born: 4 April 1975 (age 51) Dals Rostock, Sweden

Sport
- Sport: Skiing
- Club: AXA Sports Club

World Cup career
- Seasons: 15 – (1996–2010)
- Indiv. starts: 102
- Indiv. podiums: 20
- Indiv. wins: 5
- Team starts: 24
- Team podiums: 8
- Team wins: 2
- Overall titles: 0 – (7th in 2006)
- Discipline titles: 2 – (2 SP)
Medal record
Men's cross-country skiing
Representing Sweden
Event	1st	2nd	3rd
Olympic Games	1	0	1
World Championships	1	0	1
Total	2	0	2
Olympic Games
Gold medal – first place	2006 Turin	Team sprint
Bronze medal – third place	2006 Turin	Individual sprint
World Championships
Gold medal – first place	2003 Val di Fiemme	Individual sprint
Bronze medal – third place	2005 Oberstdorf	Individual sprint
Junior World Championships
Silver medal – second place	1993 Harrachov	4 × 10 km relay
Bronze medal – third place	1993 Harrachov	10 km classical
Bronze medal – third place	1994 Breitenwang	4 × 10 km relay
Bronze medal – third place	1995 Gällivare	10 km classical
- Updated on 2 April 2019

Thobias Fredriksson (born 4 April 1975 in Dals Rostock, Dalsland) is a Swedish former cross-country skier who began competing in 2000. He won two medals at the 2006 Winter Olympics in Turin, Italy with a gold in the team sprint and a bronze in the individual sprint events.

Fredriksson won two medals in the individual sprint events at the FIS Nordic World Ski Championships with a gold in 2003 and a bronze in 2005. After the 2010 season, he retired. He has a brother, Mathias Fredriksson, who skied at the same professional level.

== Cross-country skiing results ==
All results are sourced from the International Ski Federation.

=== Olympic Games ===
- 2 medals – (1 gold, 1 bronze)

Year	Age	15 km	Pursuit	30 km	50 km	Sprint	4 × 10 km relay	Team sprint
2002	26	—	—	—	—	17	—	—N/a
2006	30	—	—	—N/a	—	Bronze	—	Gold

=== World Championships ===
- 2 medals – (1 gold, 1 bronze)

Year	Age	15 km	Pursuit	30 km	50 km	Sprint	4 × 10 km relay	Team sprint
2001	25	—	—	—	—	11	—	—N/a
2003	27	—	—	—	—	Gold	—	—N/a
2005	29	—	—	—N/a	—	Bronze	—	9
2009	33	—	—	—N/a	—	29	—	—

=== World Cup ===
==== Season standings ====
Season	Age	Discipline standings					Ski Tour standings	
Season	Age	Overall	Distance	Long Distance	Middle Distance	Sprint	Tour de Ski	World Cup Final
1996	20	NC	—N/a	NC	—N/a	—	—N/a	—N/a
1997	21	79	—N/a	NC	—N/a	58	—N/a	—N/a
1998	22	30	—N/a	NC	—N/a	23	—N/a	—N/a
1999	23	43	—N/a	NC	—N/a	9	—N/a	—N/a
2000	24	73	—N/a	—	NC	39	—N/a	—N/a
2001	25	32	—N/a	—N/a	—N/a	8	—N/a	—N/a
2002	26	30	—N/a	—N/a	—N/a	4	—N/a	—N/a
2003	27	17	—N/a	—N/a	—N/a	1st place, gold medalist(s)	—N/a	—N/a
2004	28	9	61	—N/a	—N/a	1st place, gold medalist(s)	—N/a	—N/a
2005	29	18	55	—N/a	—N/a	4	—N/a	—N/a
2006	30	7	—	—N/a	—N/a	2nd place, silver medalist(s)	—N/a	—N/a
2007	31	49	NC	—N/a	—N/a	23	58	—N/a
2008	32	64	—	—N/a	—N/a	31	—	—
2009	33	110	—	—N/a	—N/a	60	—	—
2010	34	96	—	—N/a	—N/a	47	—	—

==== Individual podiums ====
- 5 victories – (5 WC)
- 20 podiums – (19 WC, 1 SWC)

No.	Season	Date	Location	Race	Level	Place
1	1997–98	12 December 1997	Milan, Italy	1.0 km Sprint F	World Cup	2nd
2	1998–99	12 December 1998	Milan, Italy	0.6 km Sprint F	World Cup	3rd
3	1998–99	27 December 1998	Garmisch-Partenkirchen, Germany	1.0 km Sprint F	World Cup	2nd
4	1998–99	27 December 1998	Kitzbühel, Austria	1.0 km Sprint F	World Cup	2nd
5	2000–01	14 January 2001	Soldier Hollow, United States	1.0 km Sprint F	World Cup	2nd
6	2001–02	6 January 2002	Val di Fiemme, Italy	1.5 km Sprint F	World Cup	3rd
7	2002-03	26 October 2002	Düsseldorf, Germany	2.0 km Sprint F	World Cup	2nd
8	2002-03	19 December 2002	Linz, Austria	1.0 km Sprint F	World Cup	2nd
9	2002-03	6 March 2003	Oslo, Norway	1.5 km Sprint C	World Cup	3rd
10	2002-03	11 March 2003	Drammen, Norway	1.0 km Sprint C	World Cup	3rd
11	2002-03	20 March 2003	Borlänge, Sweden	1.0 km Sprint F	World Cup	1st
12	2003-04	25 October 2003	Düsseldorf, Germany	1.5 km Sprint F	World Cup	3rd
13	2003-04	18 January 2004	Nové Město, Czech Republic	1.2 km Sprint F	World Cup	1st
14	2003-04	24 February 2004	Trondheim, Norway	1.5 km Sprint F	World Cup	2nd
15	2003-04	5 March 2004	Lahti, Finland	1.0 km Sprint F	World Cup	1st
16	2004-05	4 December 2004	Bern, Switzerland	1.35 km Sprint F	World Cup	2nd
17	2005-06	22 October 2005	Düsseldorf, Germany	1.5 km Sprint F	World Cup	3rd
18	2005-06	7 March 2006	Borlänge, Sweden	1.5 km Sprint F	World Cup	1st
19	2005-06	15 March 2006	Changchun, China	1.0 km Sprint F	World Cup	1st
20	2006-07	5 January 2007	Asiago, Italy	1.2 km Sprint F	Stage World Cup	2nd

==== Team podiums ====
- 2 victories – (2 TS)
- 8 podiums – (1 RL, 7 TS)

No.	Season	Date	Location	Race	Level	Place	Teammate(s)
1	2003–04	26 October 2003	Düsseldorf, Germany	6 × 1.5 km Team Sprint F	World Cup	1st	Larsson
2	2003–04	7 December 2003	Toblach, Italy	6 × 1.2 km Team Sprint F	World Cup	2nd	Larsson
3	2004–05	23 January 2005	Pragelato, Italy	6 × 1.2 km Team Sprint C	World Cup	2nd	Lind
4	2004–05	20 March 2005	Falun, Sweden	4 × 10 km Relay C/F	World Cup	3rd	Karlsson / Södergren / Fredriksson
5	2005–06	23 October 2005	Düsseldorf, Germany	6 × 1.5 km Team Sprint F	World Cup	2nd	Lind
6	2005–06	18 December 2005	Canmore, Canada	6 × 1.2 km Team Sprint C	World Cup	2nd	Lind
7	2007–08	28 October 2007	Düsseldorf, Germany	6 × 1.5 km Team Sprint F	World Cup	1st	Larsson
8	2008–09	21 December 2008	Düsseldorf, Germany	6 × 1.5 km Team Sprint F	World Cup	2nd	Lind

== See also ==
- List of Olympic medalist families
