= Björn Lind =

Swedish cross-country skier (born 1978)

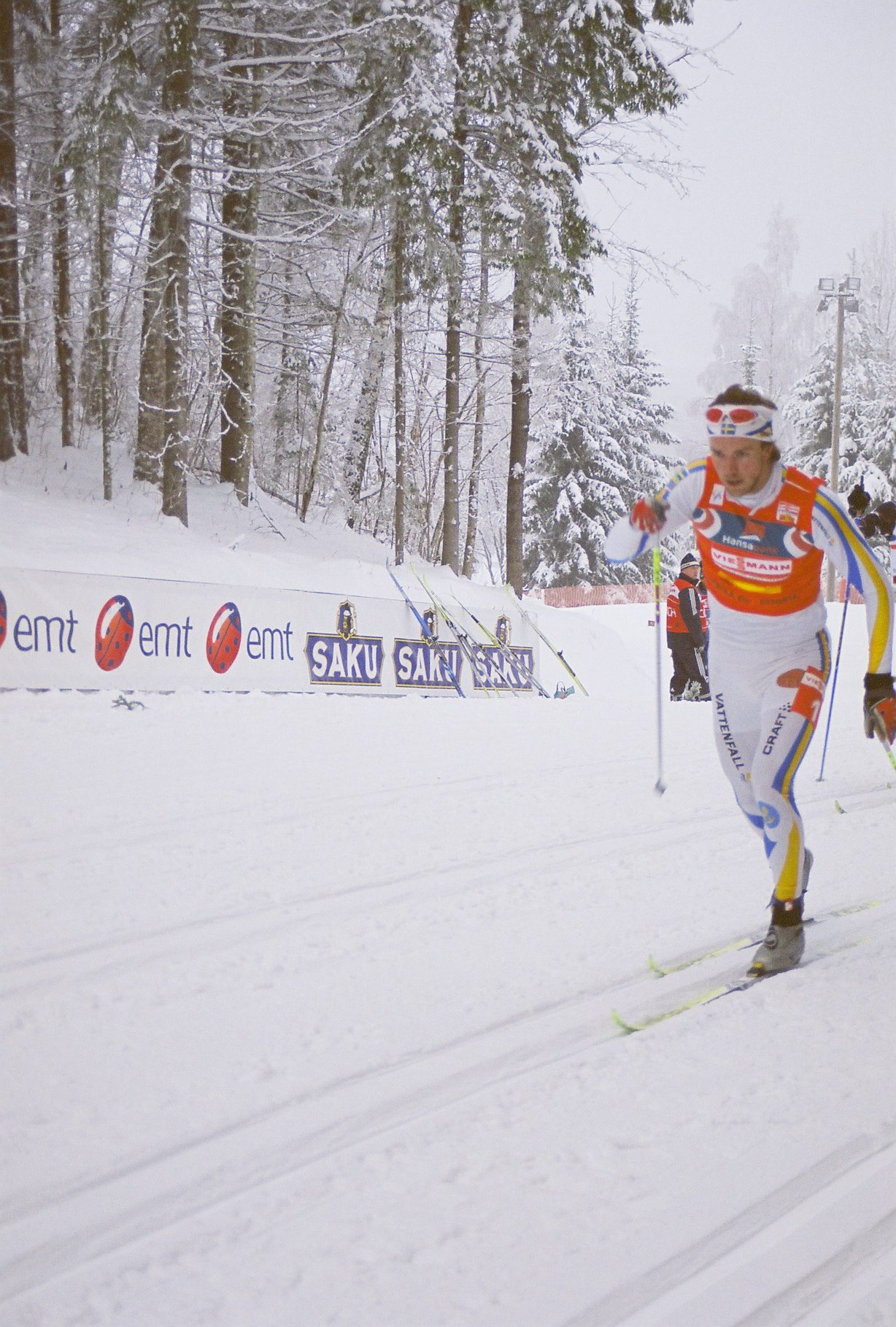
- Björn Lind at FIS Cross Country Skiing World Cup competitions in Otepää, Estonia in January 2006

Personal information
- Full name: Björn Johan Lind
- Nationality: Sweden
- Born: March 22, 1978 (age 48) Ljusterö, Sweden

Sport
- Sport: Skiing
- Club: IFK Umeå

World Cup career
- Seasons: 11 – (2000–2010)
- Indiv. starts: 74
- Indiv. podiums: 7
- Indiv. wins: 3
- Team starts: 14
- Team podiums: 6
- Team wins: 1
- Overall titles: 0 – (4th in 2006)
- Discipline titles: 1 – (1 SP)
Medal record
Men's cross-country skiing
Representing Sweden
Olympic Games
| Gold medal – first place | 2006 Turin | Individual sprint |
| Gold medal – first place | 2006 Turin | Team sprint |
- Updated on 3 April 2019

Björn Johan Lind (born March 22, 1978, in Ljusterö, Uppland) is a Swedish former cross-country skier who competed since 2000. Competing in three Winter Olympics, he won gold medals in both the Individual and Team sprint events at Turin in 2006.

Lind's best finish at the FIS Nordic World Ski Championships was a fourth in the individual sprint twice (2005, 2007). He has three World Cup victories in individual sprint events since 2005.

After the 2010–11 season, Lind retired.

== Cross-country skiing results ==
All results are sourced from the International Ski Federation (FIS).

=== Olympic Games ===
- 2 medals – (2 gold)

| Year | Age | 15 km | Pursuit | 30 km | 50 km | Sprint | 4 × 10 km relay | Team sprint |
|---|---|---|---|---|---|---|---|---|
| 2002 | 23 | — | — | — | — | 4 | — | —N/a |
| 2006 | 27 | — | — | —N/a | — | Gold | — | Gold |
| 2010 | 31 | — | — | —N/a | — | 19 | — | — |

=== World Championships ===
| Year | Age | 15 km individual | 30 km skiathlon | 50 km mass start | Sprint | 4 × 10 km relay | Team sprint |
|---|---|---|---|---|---|---|---|
| 2005 | 26 | — | — | — | 4 | — | 9 |
| 2007 | 28 | — | — | — | 4 | — | DNF |
| 2009 | 30 | — | — | — | 61 | — | — |

=== World Cup ===
==== Season titles ====
- 1 title – (1 sprint)

Season
| Season | Discipline |
| 2006 | Sprint |

==== Season standings ====
| Season | Age | Discipline standings | | | | | Ski Tour standings | |
| Season | Age | Overall | Distance | Long Distance | Middle Distance | Sprint | Tour de Ski | World Cup Final |
|---|---|---|---|---|---|---|---|---|
| 2000 | 22 | 103 | —N/a | — | — | 63 | —N/a | —N/a |
| 2001 | 23 | NC | —N/a | —N/a | —N/a | NC | —N/a | —N/a |
| 2002 | 24 | 33 | —N/a | —N/a | —N/a | 7 | —N/a | —N/a |
| 2003 | 25 | 45 | —N/a | —N/a | —N/a | 12 | —N/a | —N/a |
| 2004 | 26 | 29 | — | —N/a | —N/a | 9 | —N/a | —N/a |
| 2005 | 27 | 20 | NC | —N/a | —N/a | 6 | —N/a | —N/a |
| 2006 | 28 | 4 | 115 | —N/a | —N/a | 1st place, gold medalist(s) | —N/a | —N/a |
| 2007 | 29 | 53 | NC | —N/a | —N/a | 26 | 63 | —N/a |
| 2008 | 30 | 28 | — | —N/a | —N/a | 8 | — | — |
| 2009 | 31 | 54 | — | —N/a | —N/a | 20 | — | — |
| 2010 | 32 | 52 | — | —N/a | —N/a | 18 | — | — |

==== Individual podiums ====
- 3 victories – (3 WC)
- 7 podiums – (7 WC)

| No. | Season | Date | Location | Race | Level | Place |
|---|---|---|---|---|---|---|
| 1 | 2004–05 | 14 December 2004 | Asiago, Italy | 1.2 km Sprint C | World Cup | 3rd |
| 2 | 2004–05 | 16 January 2005 | Nové Město, Czech Republic | 1.2 km Sprint F | World Cup | 3rd |
| 3 | 2005–06 | 11 December 2005 | Vernon, Canada | 1.3 km Sprint F | World Cup | 2nd |
| 4 | 2005–06 | 30 December 2005 | Nové Město, Czech Republic | 1.2 km Sprint F | World Cup | 1st |
| 5 | 2005–06 | 8 January 2006 | Otepää, Estonia | 1.5 km Sprint C | World Cup | 1st |
| 6 | 2005–06 | 2 February 2006 | Davos, Switzerland | 1.1 km Sprint F | World Cup | 1st |
| 7 | 2007–08 | 27 October 2007 | Düsseldorf, Germany | 1.5 km Sprint F | World Cup | 2nd |

==== Team podiums ====
- 1 victory – (1 TS)
- 6 podiums – (6 TS)

| No. | Season | Date | Location | Race | Level | Place | Teammate |
|---|---|---|---|---|---|---|---|
| 1 | 2004–05 | 23 January 2005 | Pragelato, Italy | 6 × 1.2 km Team Sprint C | World Cup | 2nd | Fredriksson |
| 2 | 2005–06 | 23 October 2005 | Düsseldorf, Germany | 6 × 1.5 km Team Sprint F | World Cup | 2nd | Fredriksson |
| 3 | 2005–06 | 18 December 2005 | Canmore, Canada | 6 × 1.2 km Team Sprint C | World Cup | 2nd | Fredriksson |
| 4 | 2006–07 | 29 October 2006 | Düsseldorf, Germany | 6 × 1.5 km Team Sprint F | World Cup | 1st | Larsson |
| 5 | 2008–09 | 21 December 2008 | Düsseldorf, Germany | 6 × 1.5 km Team Sprint F | World Cup | 2nd | Fredriksson |
| 6 | 2009–10 | 6 December 2009 | Düsseldorf, Germany | 6 × 1.5 km Team Sprint F | World Cup | 3rd | Bryntesson |
