= Dals Rostock =

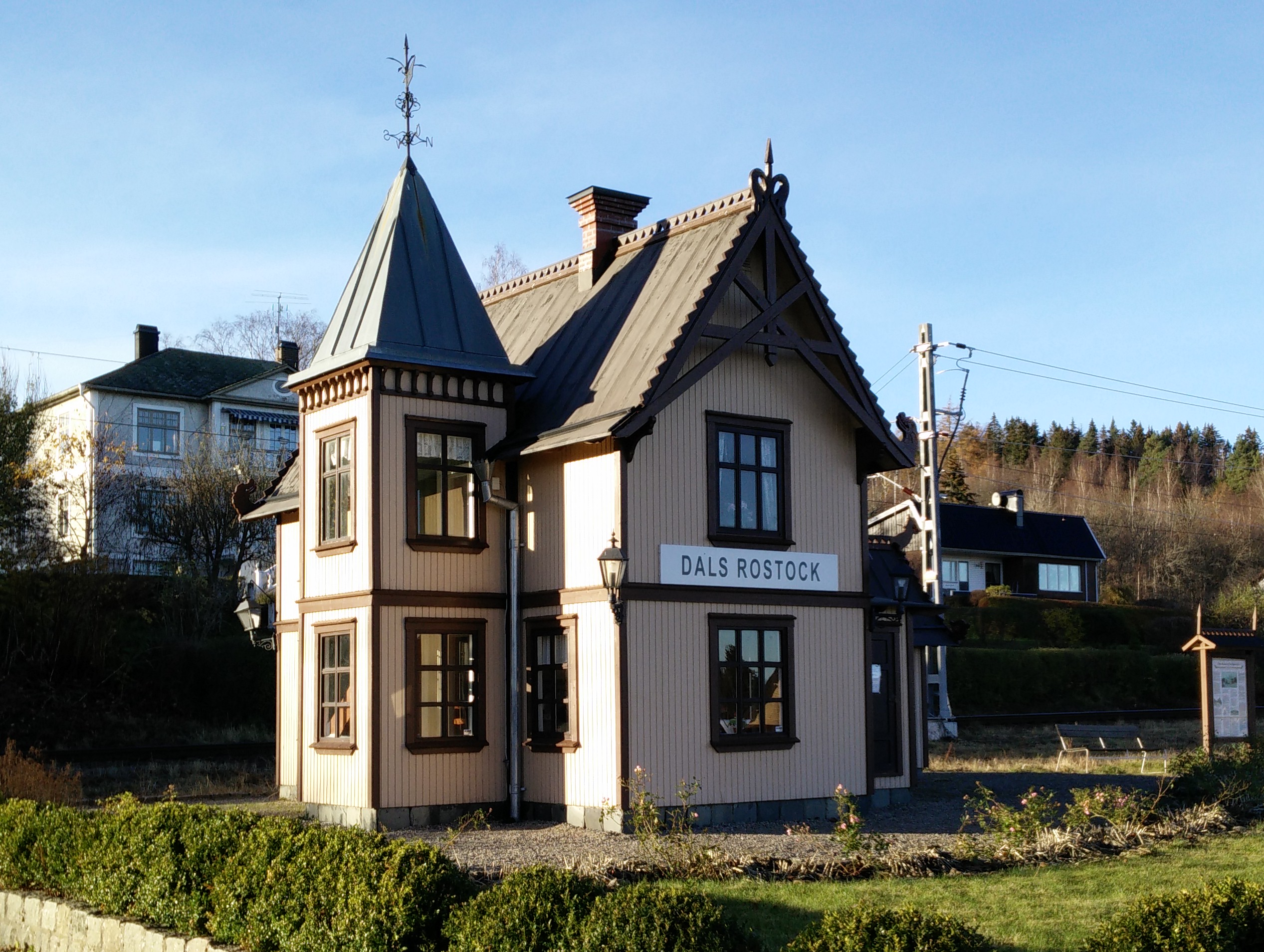
- Dals Rostock station

- Location within Västra Götaland Location within Sweden
- Coordinates: 58°43′N 12°21′E
- Country: Sweden
- Province: Dalsland
- County: Västra Götaland County
- Municipality: Mellerud Municipality

Area
  - Total: 1.41 km^{2} (0.54 sq mi)

Population (31 December 2010)
  - Total: 829
  - Density: 588/km^{2} (1,520/sq mi)
- Time zone: UTC+1 (CET)
  - Summer (DST): UTC+2 (CEST)
- Climate: Dfb

Dals Rostock (Swedish pronunciation: [dɑːls ˈrɔ̌sːtɔk]) is a locality situated in Mellerud Municipality, Västra Götaland County, Sweden. It had 829 inhabitants in 2010.
