= 2003–04 FIS Cross-Country World Cup =

Cross-country skiing competition

Discipline	Men	Women
Overall	(Germany) René Sommerfeldt	(Italy) Gabriella Paruzzi
Distance	(Germany) René Sommerfeldt	(Ukraine) Valentyna Shevchenko
Sprint	(Sweden) Thobias Fredriksson	(Norway) Marit Bjørgen
Nations Cup	Norway	Norway
- Nations Cup Overall: Norway

Competition
Locations	19 venues	19 venues
Individual	25 events	25 events
Relay/Team	9 events	9 events

The 2003–04 FIS Cross-Country World Cup was the 23rd official World Cup season in cross-country skiing for men and women. The season began in Düsseldorf, Germany on 25 October 2003 and finished in Pragelato, Italy on 14 March 2004. René Sommerfeldt of Germany won the overall men's cup, and Gabriella Paruzzi of Italy won the women's.

== Calendar ==
=== Men ===
C – Classic / F – Freestyle
WC	Date	Venue	Discipline	Winner	Second	Third	Yellow bib	Ref.
1	25 October 2003	(Germany) Düsseldorf	Sprint F	(Sweden) Peter Larsson	(Czech Republic) Martin Koukal	(Sweden) Thobias Fredriksson	(Sweden) Peter Larsson	
2	22 November 2003	(Norway) Beitostølen	15 km F	(Italy) Pietro Piller Cottrer	(Norway) Tore Ruud Hofstad	(Germany) Axel Teichmann	(Sweden) Peter Larsson (Italy) Pietro Piller Cottrer	
3	28 November 2003	(Finland) Ruka	15 km C	(Norway) Anders Aukland	(Norway) Jens Arne Svartedal	(Sweden) Anders Södergren	(Norway) Jens Arne Svartedal	
4	30 November 2003	(Finland) Ruka	30 km Skiathlon	(Germany) Axel Teichmann	(Sweden) Anders Södergren	(Germany) René Sommerfeldt	(Germany) Axel Teichmann	
5	6 December 2003	(Italy) Toblach	30 km F Mass Start	(Sweden) Mathias Fredriksson	(Germany) René Sommerfeldt	(France) Vincent Vittoz	(Sweden) Mathias Fredriksson	
6	13 December 2003	(Switzerland) Davos	15 km C	(Estonia) Andrus Veerpalu	(Russia) Nikolay Pankratov	(Sweden) Anders Södergren	(Germany) René Sommerfeldt	
7	16 December 2003	(Italy) Val di Fiemme	Sprint C	(Norway) Jens Arne Svartedal	(Norway) John Kristian Dahl	(Estonia) Andrus Veerpalu	(Germany) Axel Teichmann	
8	20 December 2003	(Austria) Ramsau	30 km Skiathlon	(Sweden) Mathias Fredriksson	(Germany) René Sommerfeldt	(Sweden) Anders Södergren	(Sweden) Mathias Fredriksson	
9	21 December 2003	(Austria) Ramsau	10 km F	(Austria) Christian Hoffmann	(Germany) Axel Teichmann	(Germany) Tobias Angerer	(Germany) René Sommerfeldt	
10	6 January 2004	(Sweden) Falun	30 km Skiathlon	(Germany) Tobias Angerer	(Italy) Pietro Piller Cottrer	(Germany) Jens Filbrich	(Germany) René Sommerfeldt	
11	10 January 2004	(Estonia) Otepää	30 km C Mass Start	(Norway) Frode Estil	(Norway) Anders Aukland	(Russia) Ivan Alypov	(Germany) René Sommerfeldt	
12	17 January 2004	(Czech Republic) Nové Město	15 km C	(Estonia) Andrus Veerpalu	(Norway) Frode Estil	(Estonia) Jaak Mae	(Germany) René Sommerfeldt	
13	18 January 2004	(Czech Republic) Nové Město	Sprint F	(Sweden) Thobias Fredriksson	(Sweden) Peter Larsson	(Norway) Håvard Bjerkeli	(Germany) René Sommerfeldt	
14	25 January 2004	(Italy) Val di Fiemme	70 km C Mass Start (Marcialonga)	(Norway) Anders Aukland	(Italy) Giorgio Di Centa	(Norway) Jørgen Aukland	(Germany) René Sommerfeldt	
15	6 February 2004	(France) La Clusaz	15 km F	(Italy) Fulvio Valbusa	(France) Vincent Vittoz	(Austria) Christian Hoffmann	(Germany) René Sommerfeldt	
16	13 February 2004	(Germany) Oberstdorf	30 km Skiathlon	(Germany) René Sommerfeldt	(Switzerland) Reto Burgermeister	(Czech Republic) Lukáš Bauer	(Germany) René Sommerfeldt	
17	18 February 2004	(Sweden) Stockholm	Sprint C	(Norway) Jens Arne Svartedal	(Norway) John Kristian Dahl	(Norway) Odd-Bjørn Hjelmeset	(Germany) René Sommerfeldt	
18	21 February 2004	(Sweden) Umeå	15 km C	(Sweden) Mathias Fredriksson	(Russia) Yevgeny Dementyev	(Estonia) Jaak Mae	(Germany) René Sommerfeldt	
19	24 February 2004	(Norway) Trondheim	Sprint F	(Poland) Janusz Krezelok	(Sweden) Thobias Fredriksson	(Sweden) Anders Högberg	(Germany) René Sommerfeldt	
20	26 February 2004	(Norway) Drammen	Sprint C	(Norway) Håvard Bjerkeli	(Norway) Tor Arne Hetland	(Sweden) Anders Högberg	(Germany) René Sommerfeldt	
21	28 February 2004	(Norway) Oslo	50 km F	(Germany) René Sommerfeldt	(Italy) Fulvio Valbusa	(Czech Republic) Lukáš Bauer	(Germany) René Sommerfeldt	
22	5 March 2004	(Finland) Lahti	Sprint F	(Sweden) Thobias Fredriksson	(Sweden) Mikael Östberg	(Sweden) Jörgen Brink	(Germany) René Sommerfeldt	
23	7 March 2004	(Finland) Lahti	15 km C	(Norway) Frode Estil	(Estonia) Jaak Mae	(Estonia) Andrus Veerpalu	(Germany) René Sommerfeldt	
24	12 March 2004	(Italy) Pragelato	Sprint F	(Italy) Freddy Schwienbacher	(Norway) Jens Arne Svartedal	(Norway) Børre Næss	(Germany) René Sommerfeldt	
25	13 March 2004	(Italy) Pragelato	30 km F	(Austria) Christian Hoffmann	(Germany) René Sommerfeldt	(Italy) Thomas Moriggl	(Germany) René Sommerfeldt	

=== Women ===
C – Classic / F – Freestyle
WC	Date	Venue	Discipline	Winner	Second	Third	Yellow bib	Ref.
1	25 October 2003	(Germany) Düsseldorf	Sprint F	(Italy) Gabriella Paruzzi	(Russia) Alyona Sidko	(Russia) Evgenia Hahina	(Italy) Gabriella Paruzzi	
2	22 November 2003	(Norway) Beitostølen	10 km F	(Estonia) Kristina Šmigun	(Ukraine) Valentyna Shevchenko	(Germany) Claudia Künzel	(Italy) Gabriella Paruzzi	
3	28 November 2003	(Finland) Ruka	10 km C	(Ukraine) Valentyna Shevchenko	(Norway) Vibeke Skofterud	(Estonia) Kristina Šmigun	(Italy) Gabriella Paruzzi	
4	29 November 2003	(Finland) Ruka	15 km Skiathlon	(Estonia) Kristina Šmigun	(Russia) Olga Zavyalova	(Germany) Evi Sachenbacher	(Estonia) Kristina Smigun	
5	6 December 2003	(Italy) Toblach	15 km F Mass Start	(Estonia) Kristina Šmigun	(Ukraine) Valentyna Shevchenko	(Germany) Claudia Künzel	(Estonia) Kristina Smigun	
6	13 December 2003	(Switzerland) Davos	10 km C	(Ukraine) Valentyna Shevchenko	(Finland) Virpi Kuitunen	(Italy) Gabriella Paruzzi	(Ukraine) Valentyna Shevchenko	
7	16 December 2003	(Italy) Val di Fiemme	Sprint C	(Norway) Marit Bjørgen	(Sweden) Anna Dahlberg	(Germany) Manuela Henkel	(Ukraine) Valentyna Shevchenko	
8	20 December 2003	(Austria) Ramsau	10 km F	(Czech Republic) Kateřina Neumannová	(Estonia) Kristina Šmigun	(Italy) Gabriella Paruzzi	(Estonia) Kristina Smigun	
9	21 December 2003	(Austria) Ramsau	10 km F	(Estonia) Kristina Šmigun	(Ukraine) Valentyna Shevchenko	(Germany) Claudia Künzel	(Estonia) Kristina Smigun	
10	6 January 2004	(Sweden) Falun	15 km Skiathlon	(Czech Republic) Kateřina Neumannová	(Italy) Gabriella Paruzzi	(Estonia) Kristina Šmigun	(Estonia) Kristina Smigun	
11	10 January 2004	(Estonia) Otepää	15 km C Mass Start	(Germany) Claudia Künzel	(Estonia) Kristina Šmigun	(Norway) Hilde Gjermundshaug Pedersen	(Estonia) Kristina Smigun	
12	17 January 2004	(Czech Republic) Nové Město	10 km C	(Italy) Gabriella Paruzzi	(Germany) Claudia Künzel	(Czech Republic) Kateřina Neumannová	(Estonia) Kristina Smigun	
13	18 January 2004	(Czech Republic) Nové Město	Sprint F	(Norway) Marit Bjørgen	(Finland) Virpi Kuitunen	(Finland) Pirjo Manninen	(Estonia) Kristina Smigun	
14	25 January 2004	(Italy) Val di Fiemme	70 km C Mass Start (Marcialonga)	(Italy) Gabriella Paruzzi	(Ukraine) Valentyna Shevchenko	(Germany) Manuela Henkel	(Estonia) Kristina Smigun	
15	6 February 2004	(France) La Clusaz	10 km F	(Czech Republic) Kateřina Neumannová	(Russia) Yuliya Chepalova	(Italy) Sabina Valbusa	(Estonia) Kristina Smigun	
16	14 February 2004	(Germany) Oberstdorf	15 km Skiathlon	(Russia) Yuliya Chepalova	(Norway) Hilde Gjermundshaug Pedersen	(Russia) Olga Zavyalova	(Estonia) Kristina Smigun	
17	18 February 2004	(Sweden) Stockholm	Sprint C	(Norway) Marit Bjørgen	(Sweden) Anna Dahlberg	(Norway) Ella Gjømle	(Estonia) Kristina Smigun	
18	21 February 2004	(Sweden) Umeå	10 km C	(Czech Republic) Kateřina Neumannová	(Norway) Hilde Gjermundshaug Pedersen	(Norway) Marit Bjørgen	(Italy) Gabriella Paruzzi	
19	24 February 2004	(Norway) Trondheim	Sprint F	(Norway) Marit Bjørgen	(Germany) Evi Sachenbacher	(Germany) Claudia Künzel	(Italy) Gabriella Paruzzi	
20	26 February 2004	(Norway) Drammen	Sprint C	(Norway) Marit Bjørgen	(Finland) Virpi Kuitunen	(Finland) Elina Hietamäki	(Italy) Gabriella Paruzzi	
21	28 February 2004	(Norway) Oslo	30 km F	(Russia) Yuliya Chepalova	(Italy) Sabina Valbusa	(Ukraine) Valentyna Shevchenko	(Italy) Gabriella Paruzzi	
22	5 March 2004	(Finland) Lahti	Sprint F	(Norway) Marit Bjørgen	(Italy) Gabriella Paruzzi	(Sweden) Anna Dahlberg	(Italy) Gabriella Paruzzi	
23	7 March 2004	(Finland) Lahti	10 km C	(Finland) Virpi Kuitunen	(Italy) Gabriella Paruzzi	(Russia) Olga Zavyalova	(Italy) Gabriella Paruzzi	
24	12 March 2004	(Italy) Pragelato	Sprint F	(Norway) Marit Bjørgen	(Canada) Beckie Scott	(Finland) Elina Hietamäki	(Italy) Gabriella Paruzzi	
25	13 March 2004	(Italy) Pragelato	15 km F	(Italy) Sabina Valbusa	(Russia) Yuliya Chepalova	(Czech Republic) Kateřina Neumannová	(Italy) Gabriella Paruzzi	

=== Men's team ===
C – Classic / F – Freestyle
WC	Date	Venue	Discipline	Winner	Second	Third	Ref.
1	26 October 2003	(Germany) Düsseldorf	Team Sprint F	Sweden I Peter Larsson; Thobias Fredriksson	Germany I Axel Teichmann; Tobias Angerer	Norway II Tor Arne Hetland; Håvard Bjerkeli	
2	23 November 2003	(Norway) Beitostølen	4 × 10 km C/C/F/F	Germany Jens Filbrich; Axel Teichmann; René Sommerfeldt; Tobias Angerer	Norway I Jens Arne Svartedal; Odd-Bjørn Hjelmeset; Lars Berger; Tore Ruud Hofstad	Norway II Frode Estil; Tore Bjonviken; Frode Andresen; Ole Einar Bjørndalen	
3	7 December 2003	(Italy) Toblach	Team Sprint F	Norway I Håvard Bjerkeli; Tor Arne Hetland	Sweden I Thobias Fredriksson; Peter Larsson	Norway II Håvard Solbakken; John Kristian Dahl	
4	14 December 2003	(Switzerland) Davos	4 × 10 km C/C/F/F	Norway I Anders Aukland; Frode Estil; Kristen Skjeldal; Tor Arne Hetland	Germany Jens Filbrich; Andreas Schlütter; René Sommerfeldt; Tobias Angerer	Sweden Martin Larsson; Mats Larsson; Johan Olsson; Anders Högberg	
5	11 January 2004	(Estonia) Otepää	4 × 10 km C/C/F/F	Germany Andreas Schlütter; Jens Filbrich; Axel Teichmann; Tobias Angerer	Italy I Bruno Carrara; Valerio Checchi; Pietro Piller Cottrer; Fulvio Valbusa	Russia I Maxim Bulgakov; Alexander Legkov; Yevgeny Dementyev; Sergey Novikov	
6	7 February 2004	(France) La Clusaz	4 × 10 km C/C/F/F	France I Alexandre Rousselet; Christophe Perrillat; Vincent Vittoz; Emmanuel Jonnier	Germany Jens Filbrich; Axel Teichmann; René Sommerfeldt; Tobias Angerer	Russia Nikolay Pankratov; Mikhail Ivanov; Yevgeny Dementyev; Sergey Novikov	
7	15 February 2004	(Germany) Oberstdorf	Team Sprint F	Germany II Jens Filbrich; Axel Teichmann	Russia I Ivan Alypov; Vasily Rochev	Germany I René Sommerfeldt; Tobias Angerer	
8	22 February 2004	(Sweden) Umeå	4 × 10 km C/C/F/F	Germany Franz Göring; Andreas Schlütter; Jens Filbrich; Axel Teichmann	Norway I Odd-Bjørn Hjelmeset; Frode Estil; Kristen Skjeldal; Tore Ruud Hofstad	Sweden I Mats Larsson; Jörgen Brink; Anders Högberg; Mathias Fredriksson	
9	6 March 2004	(Finland) Lahti	Team Sprint C	Russia I Nikolay Pankratov; Vasily Rochev	Sweden II Mats Larsson; Björn Lind	Norway I Odd-Bjørn Hjelmeset; Jens Arne Svartedal	

=== Women's team ===
C – Classic / F – Freestyle
WC	Date	Venue	Discipline	Winner	Second	Third	Ref.
1	26 October 2003	(Germany) Düsseldorf	Team Sprint F	Norway I Hilde Gjermundshaug Pedersen; Marit Bjørgen	Germany I Uschi Disl; Claudia Künzel	Russia I Alyona Sidko; Evgenia Hahina	
2	23 November 2003	(Norway) Beitostølen	4 × 5 km C/C/F/F	Norway I Vibeke Skofterud; Hilde Gjermundshaug Pedersen; Kristin Størmer Steira; Marit Bjørgen	Germany Manuela Henkel; Stefanie Böhler; Evi Sachenbacher; Claudia Künzel	Russia Evgenia Hahina; Alyona Sidko; Ekaterina Vorontsova; Olga Zavyalova	
3	7 December 2003	(Italy) Toblach	Team Sprint F	Norway I Hilde Gjermundshaug Pedersen; Marit Bjørgen	Germany I Evi Sachenbacher; Claudia Künzel	Italy II Karin Moroder; Cristina Kelder	
4	14 December 2003	(Switzerland) Davos	4 × 5 km C/C/F/F	Norway I Vibeke Skofterud; Marit Bjørgen; Kristin Mürer Stemland; Hilde Gjermundshaug Pedersen	Germany Stefanie Böhler; Manuela Henkel; Evi Sachenbacher; Claudia Künzel	Russia I Larisa Kurkina; Lilia Vasilieva; Ekaterina Vorontsova; Olga Zavyalova	
5	11 January 2004	(Estonia) Otepää	4 × 5 km C/C/F/F	Norway Vibeke Skofterud; Hilde Gjermundshaug Pedersen; Kristin Størmer Steira; Marit Bjørgen	Germany Manuela Henkel; Viola Bauer; Evi Sachenbacher; Claudia Künzel	Finland I Kirsi Välimaa; Aino-Kaisa Saarinen; Riikka Sarasoja; Virpi Kuitunen	
6	7 February 2004	(France) La Clusaz	4 × 5 km C/C/F/F	Russia Larisa Kurkina; Lilia Vasilieva; Ekaterina Vorontsova; Olga Zavyalova	Germany Manuela Henkel; Viola Bauer; Anke Reschwam Schulze; Claudia Künzel	Italy Marianna Longa; Gabriella Paruzzi; Antonella Confortola; Sabina Valbusa	
7	15 February 2004	(Germany) Oberstdorf	Team Sprint F	Norway I Hilde Gjermundshaug Pedersen; Marit Bjørgen	Germany I Evi Sachenbacher; Claudia Künzel	Germany III Manuela Henkel; Isabel Klaus	
8	22 February 2004	(Sweden) Umeå	4 × 5 km C/C/F/F	Norway Vibeke Skofterud; Marit Bjørgen; Kristin Størmer Steira; Hilde Gjermundshaug Pedersen	Russia Larisa Kurkina; Olga Zavyalova; Ekaterina Vorontsova; Yuliya Chepalova	Finland I Aino-Kaisa Saarinen; Satu Salonen; Riikka Sarasoja; Kati Venäläinen	
9	6 March 2004	(Finland) Lahti	Team Sprint C	Norway I Ella Gjømle; Hilde Gjermundshaug Pedersen	Finland I Elina Hietamäki; Pirjo Manninen	Russia Larisa Kurkina; Olga Zavyalova	

== Men's standings ==
=== Overall ===
Rank	Skier	Points
1	(Germany) René Sommerfeldt	956
2	(Sweden) Mathias Fredriksson	606
3	(Norway) Jens Arne Svartedal	592
4	(Germany) Tobias Angerer	582
5	(Germany) Axel Teichmann	575
6	(Norway) Frode Estil	558
7	(Estonia) Andrus Veerpalu	539
8	(Italy) Fulvio Valbusa	462
9	(Sweden) Thobias Fredriksson	436
10	(Sweden) Anders Södergren	434

=== Distance ===
Rank	Skier	Points
1	(Germany) René Sommerfeldt	902
2	(Sweden) Mathias Fredriksson	569
3	(Norway) Frode Estil	558
4	(Germany) Axel Teichmann	495
5	(Germany) Tobias Angerer	488
6	(Estonia) Andrus Veerpalu	465
7	(Italy) Fulvio Valbusa	439
8	(Sweden) Anders Södergren	434
9	(Czech Republic) Lukáš Bauer	420
10	(Italy) Pietro Piller Cottrer	411

=== Sprint ===
Rank	Skier	Points
1	(Sweden) Thobias Fredriksson	410
2	(Norway) Jens Arne Svartedal	381
3	(Norway) Håvard Bjerkeli	337
4	(Norway) Tor Arne Hetland	296
5	(Sweden) Peter Larsson	270
6	(Norway) John Kristian Dahl	237
7	(Poland) Janusz Krężelok	226
8	(Sweden) Jörgen Brink	212
9	(Sweden) Björn Lind	211
10	(Sweden) Anders Högberg	191

== Women's standings ==
=== Overall ===
Rank	Skier	Points
1	(Italy) Gabriella Paruzzi	1228
2	(Norway) Marit Bjørgen	1139
3	(Ukraine) Valentyna Shevchenko	983
4	(Norway) Hilde Gjermundshaug Pedersen	856
5	(Estonia) Kristina Šmigun	853
6	(Finland) Virpi Kuitunen	848
7	(Germany) Claudia Künzel	762
8	(Russia) Olga Zavyalova	664
9	(Czech Republic) Kateřina Neumannová	629
10	(Italy) Sabina Valbusa	554

=== Distance ===
Rank	Skier	Points
1	(Ukraine) Valentyna Shevchenko	983
2	(Italy) Gabriella Paruzzi	870
3	(Estonia) Kristina Šmigun	839
4	(Norway) Hilde Gjermundshaug Pedersen	656
5	(Russia) Olga Zavyalova	625
6	(Germany) Claudia Künzel	587
7	(Finland) Virpi Kuitunen	543
8	(Czech Republic) Kateřina Neumannová	542
9	(Italy) Sabina Valbusa	527
10	(Russia) Yuliya Chepalova	460

=== Sprint ===
Rank	Skier	Points
1	(Norway) Marit Bjørgen	745
2	(Italy) Gabriella Paruzzi	358
3	(Sweden) Anna Dahlberg	330
4	(Finland) Virpi Kuitunen	305
5	(Finland) Elina Hietamäki	268
6	(Canada) Beckie Scott	229
7	(Finland) Aino-Kaisa Saarinen	205
8	(Norway) Hilde Gjermundshaug Pedersen	200
9	(Germany) Manuela Henkel	189
10	(Germany) Claudia Künzel	175

== Nations Cup ==
=== Overall ===
Rank	Nation	Points
1	Norway	9915
2	Germany	7452
3	Italy	6552
4	Russia	5572
5	Sweden	5347
6	Finland	3889
7	Estonia	2228
8	Czech Republic	1576
9	Kazakhstan	1284
10	France	1172

=== Men ===
Rank	Nation	Points
1	Norway	5130
2	Germany	4146
3	Sweden	3840
4	Italy	3263
5	Russia	2245
6	Estonia	1311
7	Czech Republic	892
8	France	855
9	Finland	668
10	Kazakhstan	638

=== Women ===
Rank	Nation	Points
1	Norway	4785
2	Russia	3327
3	Germany	3306
4	Italy	3289
5	Finland	3221
6	Sweden	1507
7	Ukraine	993
8	Estonia	917
9	Czech Republic	684
10	Kazakhstan	646

== Achievements ==
Victories in this World Cup (all-time number of victories as of 2003–04 season in parentheses)

Men

- Mathias Fredriksson (SWE), 3 (8) first places
- Jens Arne Svartedal (NOR), 2 (6) first places
- Anders Aukland (NOR), 2 (5) first places
- Andrus Veerpalu (EST), 2 (4) first places
- Frode Estil (NOR), 2 (4) first places
- Thobias Fredriksson (SWE), 2 (3) first places
- René Sommerfeldt (GER), 2 (3) first places
- Christian Hoffmann (AUT), 2 (2) first places
- Håvard Bjerkeli (NOR), 1 (3) first place
- Peter Larsson (SWE), 1 (2) first place
- Pietro Piller Cottrer (ITA), 1 (2) first place
- Axel Teichmann (GER), 1 (2) first place
- Fulvio Valbusa (ITA), 1 (2) first place
- Tobias Angerer (GER), 1 (1) first place
- Janusz Krężelok (POL), 1 (1) first place
- Freddy Schwienbacher (ITA), 1 (1) first place

Women

- Marit Bjørgen (NOR), 7 (10) first places
- Kristina Šmigun (EST), 4 (13) first places
- Kateřina Neumannová (CZE), 4 (11) first places
- Gabriella Paruzzi (ITA), 3 (4) first places
- Yuliya Chepalova (RUS), 2 (15) first places
- Valentyna Shevchenko (UKR), 2 (2) first places
- Claudia Künzel (GER), 1 (1) first place
- Virpi Kuitunen (FIN), 1 (1) first place
- Sabina Valbusa (ITA), 1 (1) first place
