= 2005–06 FIS Cross-Country World Cup =

Cross-country skiing competition

Discipline	Men	Women
Overall	(Germany) Tobias Angerer	(Norway) Marit Bjørgen (2nd title)
Distance	(Germany) Tobias Angerer	(Russia) Yuliya Chepalova
Sprint	(Sweden) Björn Lind	(Norway) Marit Bjørgen
Nations Cup	Norway	Norway
- Nations Cup Overall: Norway

Competition
Locations	17 venues	17 venues
Individual	24 events	24 events
Relay/Team	5 events	5 events

The 2005–06 FIS Cross-Country World Cup was the 25th official World Cup season in cross-country skiing for men and women. The season began in Düsseldorf on 22 October 2005 and was concluded in Sapporo on 19 March 2006.

== Calendar ==
=== Men ===
Key: C – Classic / F – Freestyle
WC	Date	Place	Discipline	Winner	Second	Third	Yellow bib	Ref.
1	22 October 2005	(Germany) Düsseldorf	Sprint F	(Sweden) Peter Larsson	(Norway) Tor Arne Hetland	(Sweden) Thobias Fredriksson	(Sweden) Peter Larsson	
2	19 November 2005	(Norway) Beitostølen	15 km C	(Norway) Tor Arne Hetland	(Norway) Jens Arne Svartedal	(Slovakia) Ivan Bátory	(Norway) Tor Arne Hetland	
3	26 November 2005	(Finland) Ruka	15 km C	(Germany) Tobias Angerer	(Norway) Jens Arne Svartedal	(Germany) Jens Filbrich	(Norway) Tor Arne Hetland	
4	27 November 2005	(Finland) Ruka	15 km F	(Norway) Tore Ruud Hofstad	(France) Vincent Vittoz	(Germany) Tobias Angerer	(Norway) Tor Arne Hetland	
5	10 December 2005	(Canada) Vernon	15 km C + 15 km F Double Pursuit	(Germany) Tobias Angerer	(Germany) Axel Teichmann	(Germany) Andreas Schlütter	(Germany) Tobias Angerer	
6	11 December 2005	(Canada) Vernon	Sprint F	(Norway) Tor Arne Hetland	(Sweden) Björn Lind	(Norway) Ola Vigen Hattestad	(Norway) Tor Arne Hetland	
7	15 December 2005	(Canada) Canmore	15 km F	(Italy) Pietro Piller Cottrer	(France) Vincent Vittoz	(Germany) Tobias Angerer	(Germany) Tobias Angerer	
8	17 December 2005	(Canada) Canmore	30 km C Mass Start	(Germany) Tobias Angerer	(Norway) Frode Estil	(Germany) Jens Filbrich	(Germany) Tobias Angerer	
9	30 December 2005	(Czech Republic) Nové Město	Sprint F	(Sweden) Björn Lind	(Sweden) Peter Larsson	(Norway) Johan Kjølstad	(Germany) Tobias Angerer	
10	31 December 2005	(Czech Republic) Nové Město	15 km F	(France) Vincent Vittoz	(Czech Republic) Lukáš Bauer	(Austria) Christian Hoffmann	(Germany) Tobias Angerer	
11	7 January 2006	(Estonia) Otepää	15 km C	(Russia) Vasily Rochev	(Czech Republic) Lukáš Bauer	(Russia) Sergey Novikov	(Germany) Tobias Angerer	
12	8 January 2006	(Estonia) Otepää	Sprint C	(Sweden) Björn Lind	(Norway) Tor Arne Hetland	(Russia) Vasily Rochev	(Germany) Tobias Angerer	
13	14 January 2006	(Italy) Val di Fiemme	30 km F Mass Start	(Germany) Tobias Angerer	(Russia) Yevgeny Dementyev	(Italy) Pietro Piller Cottrer	(Germany) Tobias Angerer	
14	21 January 2006	(Germany) Oberstdorf	15 km C + 15 km F Double Pursuit	(Germany) Tobias Angerer	(Sweden) Anders Södergren	(Germany) René Sommerfeldt	(Germany) Tobias Angerer	
15	22 January 2006	(Germany) Oberstdorf	Sprint C	(Norway) Odd-Bjørn Hjelmeset	(Norway) Johan Kjølstad	(Russia) Vasily Rochev	(Germany) Tobias Angerer	
16	4 February 2006	(Switzerland) Davos	Sprint F	(Sweden) Björn Lind	(Italy) Cristian Zorzi	(Norway) John Kristian Dahl	(Germany) Tobias Angerer	
17	5 February 2006	(Switzerland) Davos	15 km C	(Norway) Jens Arne Svartedal	(Austria) Martin Tauber	(France) Vincent Vittoz	(Germany) Tobias Angerer	
2006 Winter Olympics (12–26 February)
18	5 March 2006	(Sweden) Sälen–Mora	90 km C Mass start (Vasaloppet)	(Sweden) Daniel Tynell	(Sweden) Jerry Ahrlin	(Norway) Anders Aukland	(Germany) Tobias Angerer	
19	7 March 2006	(Sweden) Borlänge	Sprint F	(Sweden) Thobias Fredriksson	(Sweden) Peter Larsson	(Canada) Devon Kershaw	(Germany) Tobias Angerer	
20	8 March 2006	(Sweden) Falun	10 km C + 10 km F Double Pursuit	(Norway) Petter Northug	(Germany) Tobias Angerer	(Germany) Axel Teichmann	(Germany) Tobias Angerer	
21	9 March 2006	(Norway) Drammen	Sprint C	(Norway) Jens Arne Svartedal	(Norway) Børre Næss	(Norway) Eldar Rønning	(Germany) Tobias Angerer	
22	11 March 2006	(Norway) Oslo	50 km F	(Sweden) Anders Södergren	(Italy) Giorgio Di Centa	(Germany) Tom Reichelt	(Germany) Tobias Angerer	
23	15 March 2006	(China) Changchun	Sprint F	(Sweden) Thobias Fredriksson	(Switzerland) Christoph Eigenmann	(United States) Andrew Newell	(Germany) Tobias Angerer	
24	19 March 2006	(Japan) Sapporo	15 km C + 15 km F Double Pursuit	(Sweden) Mathias Fredriksson	(Norway) Petter Northug	(Sweden) Anders Södergren	(Germany) Tobias Angerer	

=== Women ===
Key: C – Classic / F – Freestyle
WC	Date	Place	Discipline	Winner	Second	Third	Yellow bib	Ref.
1	22 October 2005	(Germany) Düsseldorf	Sprint F	(Norway) Marit Bjørgen	(Finland) Aino-Kaisa Saarinen	(Russia) Natalya Matveyeva	(Norway) Marit Bjørgen	
2	19 November 2005	(Norway) Beitostølen	10 km C	(Norway) Marit Bjørgen	(Finland) Virpi Kuitunen	(Russia) Natalya Baranova-Masalkina	(Norway) Marit Bjørgen	
3	26 November 2005	(Finland) Ruka	10 km C	(Norway) Marit Bjørgen	(Finland) Virpi Kuitunen	(Germany) Claudia Künzel-Nystad	(Norway) Marit Bjørgen	
4	27 November 2005	(Finland) Ruka	10 km F	(Czech Republic) Kateřina Neumannová	(Russia) Yuliya Chepalova	(Estonia) Kristina Šmigun	(Norway) Marit Bjørgen	
5	10 December 2005	(Canada) Vernon	7.5 km C+7.5 km F Double Pursuit	(Norway) Marit Bjørgen	(Canada) Beckie Scott	(Norway) Hilde Gjermundshaug Pedersen	(Norway) Marit Bjørgen	
6	11 December 2005	(Canada) Vernon	Sprint F	(Canada) Beckie Scott	(Germany) Claudia Künzel-Nystad	(Canada) Sara Renner	(Norway) Marit Bjørgen	
7	15 December 2005	(Canada) Canmore	10 km F	(Russia) Yuliya Chepalova	(Canada) Beckie Scott	(Germany) Evi Sachenbacher-Stehle	(Norway) Marit Bjørgen	
8	17 December 2005	(Canada) Canmore	15 km C Mass start	(Canada) Beckie Scott	(Russia) Yuliya Chepalova	(Germany) Claudia Künzel-Nystad	(Norway) Marit Bjørgen	
9	30 December 2005	(Czech Republic) Nové Město	Sprint F	(Russia) Alyona Sidko	(Sweden) Anna Dahlberg	(Germany) Claudia Künzel-Nystad	(Norway) Marit Bjørgen	
10	31 December 2005	(Czech Republic) Nové Město	10 km F	(Czech Republic) Kateřina Neumannová	(Russia) Yuliya Chepalova	(Ukraine) Valentyna Shevchenko	(Norway) Marit Bjørgen	
11	7 January 2006	(Estonia) Otepää	10 km C	(Norway) Hilde Gjermundshaug Pedersen	(Estonia) Kristina Šmigun	(Poland) Justyna Kowalczyk	(Norway) Marit Bjørgen	
12	8 January 2006	(Estonia) Otepää	Sprint C	(Sweden) Lina Andersson	(Germany) Manuela Henkel	(Norway) Ella Gjømle	(Norway) Marit Bjørgen	
13	14 January 2006	(Italy) Val di Fiemme	15 km F Mass start	(Czech Republic) Kateřina Neumannová	(Russia) Yuliya Chepalova	(Norway) Marit Bjørgen	(Norway) Marit Bjørgen	
14	21 January 2006	(Germany) Oberstdorf	7.5 km C+7.5 km F Double Pursuit	(Canada) Beckie Scott	(Germany) Claudia Künzel-Nystad	(Czech Republic) Kateřina Neumannová	(Norway) Marit Bjørgen	
15	22 January 2006	(Germany) Oberstdorf	Sprint C	(Norway) Ella Gjømle	(Sweden) Lina Andersson	(Norway) Guro Strøm Solli	(Norway) Marit Bjørgen	
16	4 February 2006	(Switzerland) Davos	Sprint F	(Sweden) Anna Dahlberg	(Finland) Virpi Kuitunen	(Canada) Chandra Crawford	(Norway) Marit Bjørgen	
17	5 February 2006	(Switzerland) Davos	10 km C	(Finland) Virpi Kuitunen	(Canada) Sara Renner	(Slovenia) Petra Majdič	(Norway) Marit Bjørgen	
2006 Winter Olympics (12–26 February)
18	4 March 2006	(Sweden) Mora	45 km C Mass start	(Norway) Marit Bjørgen	(Norway) Hilde Gjermundshaug Pedersen	(Slovenia) Petra Majdič	(Norway) Marit Bjørgen	
19	7 March 2006	(Sweden) Borlänge	Sprint F	(Italy) Arianna Follis	(Norway) Marit Bjørgen	(Canada) Sara Renner	(Norway) Marit Bjørgen	
20	8 March 2006	(Sweden) Falun	5 km C+5 km F Double Pursuit	(Germany) Evi Sachenbacher-Stehle	(Czech Republic) Kateřina Neumannová	(Canada) Beckie Scott	(Norway) Marit Bjørgen	
21	9 March 2006	(Norway) Drammen	Sprint C	(Slovenia) Petra Majdič	(Canada) Beckie Scott	(Norway) Hilde Gjermundshaug Pedersen	(Norway) Marit Bjørgen	
22	11 March 2006	(Norway) Oslo	30 km F	(Russia) Yuliya Chepalova	(Czech Republic) Kateřina Neumannová	(Germany) Evi Sachenbacher-Stehle	(Norway) Marit Bjørgen	
23	15 March 2006	(China) Changchun	Sprint F	(Norway) Marit Bjørgen	(Canada) Beckie Scott	(Norway) Ella Gjømle	(Norway) Marit Bjørgen	
24	19 March 2006	(Japan) Sapporo	7.5 km C+7.5 km F Double Pursuit	(Canada) Beckie Scott	(Norway) Kristin Størmer Steira	(Germany) Evi Sachenbacher-Stehle	(Norway) Marit Bjørgen	

=== Men's team ===
WC	Date	Place	Discipline	Winner	Second	Third	Ref.
1	23 October 2005	(Germany) Düsseldorf	Team Sprint F	Norway II Trond Iversen; Johan Kjølstad	Sweden Thobias Fredriksson; Björn Lind	Norway I Eldar Rønning; Tor Arne Hetland	
2	20 November 2005	(Norway) Beitostølen	4 × 10 km relay C/F	Germany Andreas Schlütter; Axel Teichmann; Jens Filbrich; Tobias Angerer	France Alexandre Rousselet; Christophe Perrillat; Emmanuel Jonnier; Vincent Vittoz	Norway Eldar Rønning; Jens Arne Svartedal; Tor Arne Hetland; Tore Ruud Hofstad	
3	18 December 2005	(Canada) Canmore	Team Sprint C	Norway Jens Arne Svartedal; Eldar Rønning	Sweden I Björn Lind; Thobias Fredriksson	Sweden II Mats Larsson; Mikael Östberg	
4	15 January 2006	(Italy) Val di Fiemme	4 × 10 km relay C/F	Italy Giorgio di Centa; Valerio Checchi; Pietro Piller Cottrer; Cristian Zorzi	Germany René Sommerfeldt; Axel Teichmann; Jens Filbrich; Tobias Angerer	Norway Odd-Bjørn Hjelmeset; Jens Arne Svartedal; Tord Asle Gjerdalen; Tore Ruud Hofstad	
5	18 March 2006	(Japan) Sapporo	Team Sprint F	Italy Loris Frasnelli; Cristian Zorzi	Norway Johan Kjølstad; Eldar Rønning	Germany Tobias Angerer; Axel Teichmann	

=== Women's team ===
WC	Date	Place	Discipline	Winner	Second	Third	Ref.
1	23 October 2005	(Germany) Düsseldorf	Team Sprint F	Norway I Hilde Gjermundshaug Pedersen; Marit Bjørgen	Norway II Ella Gjømle; Guro Strøm Solli	Russia Natalya Matveyeva; Alyona Sidko	
2	20 November 2005	(Norway) Beitostølen	4 × 5 km relay C/F	Norway Ella Gjømle; Vibeke Skofterud; Hilde Gjermundshaug Pedersen; Marit Bjørgen	Germany Manuela Henkel; Stefanie Böhler; Claudia Künzel-Nystad; Evi Sachenbacher-Stehle	Finland Aino-Kaisa Saarinen; Kirsi Välimaa; Riitta-Liisa Roponen; Virpi Kuitunen	
3	18 December 2005	(Canada) Canmore	Team Sprint C	Germany Manuela Henkel; Viola Bauer	Canada Beckie Scott; Sara Renner	Sweden Lina Andersson; Anna Dahlberg	
4	15 January 2006	(Italy) Val di Fiemme	4 × 5 km relay C/F	Finland Aino-Kaisa Saarinen; Virpi Kuitunen; Riitta-Liisa Roponen; Kaisa Varis	Russia Olga Rocheva; Natalya Baranova-Masalkina; Yevgeniya Medvedeva-Abruzova; Yuliya Chepalova	Norway Vibeke Skofterud; Marit Bjørgen; Kristin Mürer Stemland; Kristin Størmer Steira	
5	18 March 2006	(Japan) Sapporo	Team Sprint F	Germany Evi Sachenbacher-Stehle; Claudia Künzel-Nystad	Finland Riitta-Liisa Roponen; Pirjo Manninen	Sweden Britta Norgren; Anna-Karin Strömstedt	

== Men's standings ==
=== Overall ===
Rank		Points
1	(Germany) Tobias Angerer	829
2	(Norway) Jens Arne Svartedal	577
3	(Norway) Tor Arne Hetland	570
4	(Sweden) Björn Lind	531
5	(France) Vincent Vittoz	502
6	(Russia) Vasily Rochev	443
7	(Sweden) Thobias Fredriksson	414
8	(Sweden) Anders Södergren	392
9	(Norway) Frode Estil	373
10	(Sweden) Mathias Fredriksson	368

=== Distance ===
Rank		Points
1	(Germany) Tobias Angerer	793
2	(France) Vincent Vittoz	502
3	(Sweden) Anders Södergren	392
4	(Norway) Frode Estil	373
5	(Norway) Jens Arne Svartedal	372
6	(Sweden) Mathias Fredriksson	365
7	(Italy) Pietro Piller Cottrer	330
8	(Italy) Giorgio Di Centa	279
9	(Germany) René Sommerfeldt	267
10	(Germany) Jens Filbrich	259

=== Sprint ===
Rank		Points
1	(Sweden) Björn Lind	586
2	(Sweden) Thobias Fredriksson	443
3	(Norway) Tor Arne Hetland	423
4	(Sweden) Peter Larsson	358
5	(Norway) Johan Kjølstad	320
6	(Russia) Vasily Rochev	262
7	(Norway) Eldar Rønning	237
8	(United States) Andrew Newell	222
9	(Norway) Jens Arne Svartedal	205
10	(Switzerland) Christoph Eigenmann	199

== Women's standings ==
=== Overall ===
Rank		Points
1	(Norway) Marit Bjørgen	1036
2	(Canada) Beckie Scott	1020
3	(Russia) Yuliya Chepalova	780
4	(Germany) Evi Sachenbacher-Stehle	716
5	(Czech Republic) Kateřina Neumannová	655
6	(Finland) Virpi Kuitunen	636
7	(Germany) Claudia Nystad	571
8	(Norway) Hilde Gjermundshaug Pedersen	557
9	(Slovenia) Petra Majdič	538
10	(Canada) Sara Renner	446

=== Distance ===
Rank		Points
1	(Russia) Yuliya Chepalova	750
2	(Czech Republic) Kateřina Neumannová	655
3	(Canada) Beckie Scott	644
4	(Norway) Marit Bjørgen	642
5	(Germany) Evi Sachenbacher-Stehle	575
6	(Norway) Hilde Gjermundshaug Pedersen	421
7	(Finland) Virpi Kuitunen	411
8	(Ukraine) Valentyna Shevchenko	575
9	(Germany) Claudia Nystad	337
10	(Slovenia) Petra Majdič	333

=== Sprint ===
Rank		Points
1	(Norway) Marit Bjørgen	394
2	(Norway) Ella Gjømle	388
3	(Canada) Beckie Scott	376
4	(Sweden) Lina Andersson	309
5	(Germany) Manuela Henkel	289
6	(Sweden) Anna Dahlberg	282
7	(Italy) Arianna Follis	235
8	(Germany) Claudia Nystad	234
9	(Sweden) Emilie Öhrstig	228
10	(Finland) Virpi Kuitunen	225

== Nations Cup ==
=== Overall ===
Rank		Points
1	Norway	8728
2	Sweden	5435
3	Germany	5287
4	Russia	4354
5	Italy	3226
6	Finland	2680
7	Canada	2117
8	France	2076
9	Czech Republic	1584
10	Estonia	1210

=== Men ===
Rank		Points
1	Norway	5166
2	Sweden	3526
3	Germany	2474
4	Italy	2074
5	Russia	1533
6	France	1520
7	Estonia	812
8	Czech Republic	795
9	Austria	620
10	Finland	520

=== Women ===
Rank		Points
1	Norway	3562
2	Russia	3001
3	Germany	2813
4	Finland	2160
5	Sweden	1909
6	Canada	1841
7	Italy	1147
8	Czech Republic	789
9	Slovenia	610
10	France	556

== Points distribution ==
The World Cup points in the 2005–06 season were awarded according to the following table:

Place	1	2	3	4	5	6	7	8	9	10	11	12	13	14	15	16	17	18	19	20	21	22	23	24	25	26	27	28	29	30
Individual	100	80	60	50	45	40	36	32	29	26	24	22	20	18	16	15	14	13	12	11	10	9	8	7	6	5	4	3	2	1
Team Sprint	100	80	60	50	45	40	36	32	29	26	24	22	20	18	16	15	14	13	12	11	10	9	8	7	6	5	4	3	2	1
Relay	200	160	120	100	90	80	72	64	58	52	48	44	40	36	32	30	28	26	24	22	20	18	16	14	12	10	8	6	4	2

== Achievements ==
Victories in this World Cup (all-time number of victories as of 2005–06 season in parentheses)

Men

- Tobias Angerer (GER), 5 (6) first places
- Björn Lind (SWE), 3 (3) first places
- Tor Arne Hetland (NOR), 2 (10) first places
- Jens Arne Svartedal (NOR), 2 (9) first places
- Thobias Fredriksson (SWE), 2 (5) first places
- Mathias Fredriksson (SWE), 1 (9) first places
- Odd-Bjørn Hjelmeset (NOR), 1 (6) first place
- Vincent Vittoz (FRA), 1 (5) first place
- Peter Larsson (SWE), 1 (4) first place
- Pietro Piller Cottrer (ITA), 1 (3) first place
- Vasily Rochev (RUS), 1 (2) first place
- Tore Ruud Hofstad (NOR), 1 (1) first place
- Daniel Tynell (SWE), 1 (1) first place
- Petter Northug (NOR), 1 (1) first place
- Anders Södergren (SWE), 1 (1) first place

Women

- Marit Bjørgen (NOR), 6 (26) first places
- Beckie Scott (CAN), 4 (4) first places
- Kateřina Neumannová (CZE), 3 (16) first places
- Yuliya Chepalova (RUS), 2 (18) first places
- Virpi Kuitunen (FIN), 1 (4) first place
- Evi Sachenbacher-Stehle (GER), 1 (3) first place
- Lina Andersson (SWE), 1 (2) first place
- Alyona Sidko (RUS), 1 (1) first place
- Hilde Gjermundshaug Pedersen (NOR), 1 (1) first place
- Ella Gjømle (NOR), 1 (1) first place
- Anna Dahlberg (SWE), 1 (1) first place
- Arianna Follis (ITA), 1 (1) first place
- Petra Majdič (SLO), 1 (1) first place

== Retirements ==
Men

Women

Beckie Scott (CAN)
