= Cross-country skiing at the 2006 Winter Olympics =

Cross-country skiing at the XX Olympic Winter Games
- Venue: Pragelato Plan
- Dates: 11–26 February 2006
- No. of events: 12
- Competitors: 307 from 53 nations

The cross-country skiing events at the 2006 Winter Olympics featured 12 events, from 11 to 26 February 2006 at Pragelato in Turin.

== Medal summary ==
=== Medal table ===
Rank	Nation	Gold	Silver	Bronze	Total
1	Sweden	3	0	2	5
2	Estonia	3	0	0	3
3	Russia	2	2	3	7
4	Italy	2	0	2	4
5	Czech Republic	1	2	0	3
6	Canada	1	1	0	2
7	Germany	0	3	1	4
7	Norway	0	3	1	4
9	France	0	1	0	1
10	Austria	0	0	1	1
10	Finland	0	0	1	1
10	Poland	0	0	1	1
Totals (12 entries)		12	12	12	36

=== Men's events ===
Event	Gold	Silver	Bronze
15 km classical	Andrus Veerpalu; Estonia	Lukáš Bauer; Czech Republic	Tobias Angerer; Germany
30 km pursuit	Yevgeny Dementyev; Russia	Frode Estil; Norway	Pietro Piller Cottrer; Italy
50 km freestyle	Giorgio Di Centa; Italy	Yevgeny Dementyev; Russia	Mikhail Botvinov; Austria
4 × 10 km relay	Italy; Fulvio Valbusa; Giorgio Di Centa; Pietro Piller Cottrer; Cristian Zorzi	Germany; Andreas Schlütter; Jens Filbrich; René Sommerfeldt; Tobias Angerer	Sweden; Mats Larsson; Johan Olsson; Anders Södergren; Mathias Fredriksson
Sprint	Björn Lind; Sweden	Roddy Darragon; France	Thobias Fredriksson; Sweden
Team sprint	Sweden; Thobias Fredriksson; Björn Lind	Norway; Jens Arne Svartedal; Tor Arne Hetland	Russia; Ivan Alypov; Vasily Rochev

=== Women's events ===
Event	Gold	Silver	Bronze
10 km classical	Kristina Šmigun; Estonia	Marit Bjørgen; Norway	Hilde Gjermundshaug Pedersen; Norway
15 km pursuit	Kristina Šmigun; Estonia	Kateřina Neumannová; Czech Republic	Yevgeniya Medvedeva-Arbuzova; Russia
30 km freestyle	Kateřina Neumannová; Czech Republic	Yuliya Chepalova; Russia	Justyna Kowalczyk; Poland
4 × 5 km relay	Russia; Natalya Baranova-Masalkina; Larisa Kurkina; Yuliya Chepalova; Yevgeniya Medvedeva-Arbuzova	Germany; Stefanie Böhler; Viola Bauer; Evi Sachenbacher-Stehle; Claudia Künzel	Italy; Arianna Follis; Gabriella Paruzzi; Antonella Confortola; Sabina Valbusa
Sprint	Chandra Crawford; Canada	Claudia Künzel; Germany	Alyona Sidko; Russia
Team sprint	Sweden; Lina Andersson; Anna Dahlberg	Canada; Sara Renner; Beckie Scott	Finland; Aino-Kaisa Saarinen; Virpi Kuitunen

== Participating nations ==
Fifty-three nations contributed competitors to the events. Below is a list of the competing nations; in parentheses are the number of national competitors.

- Algeria (1)
- Andorra (1)
- Argentina (1)
- Armenia (2)
- Australia (3)
- Austria (7)
- Belarus (7)
- Bosnia and Herzegovina (2)
- Brazil (2)
- Bulgaria (1)
- Canada (12)
- China (20)
- Costa Rica (1)
- Croatia (4)
- Czech Republic (11)
- Spain (5)
- Estonia (12)
- Ethiopia (1)
- Finland (13)
- France (11)
- Germany (11)
- Greece (2)
- Hungary (2)
- India (1)
- Iran (1)
- Ireland (1)
- Italy (17)
- Japan (9)
- Kazakhstan (17)
- Kenya (1)
- South Korea (4)
- Latvia (4)
- Liechtenstein (1)
- Lithuania (2)
- Moldova (2)
- Mongolia (2)
- Macedonia (1)
- Nepal (1)
- Norway (16)
- Poland (3)
- Portugal (1)
- Romania (3)
- South Africa (1)
- Russia (18)
- Serbia and Montenegro (2)
- Slovenia (5)
- Switzerland (9)
- Slovakia (6)
- Sweden (15)
- Thailand (1)
- Turkey (3)
- Ukraine (12)
- United States (16)

== See also ==
- Cross-country skiing at the 2006 Winter Paralympics
