= Petra Majdič =

Slovenian cross-country skier

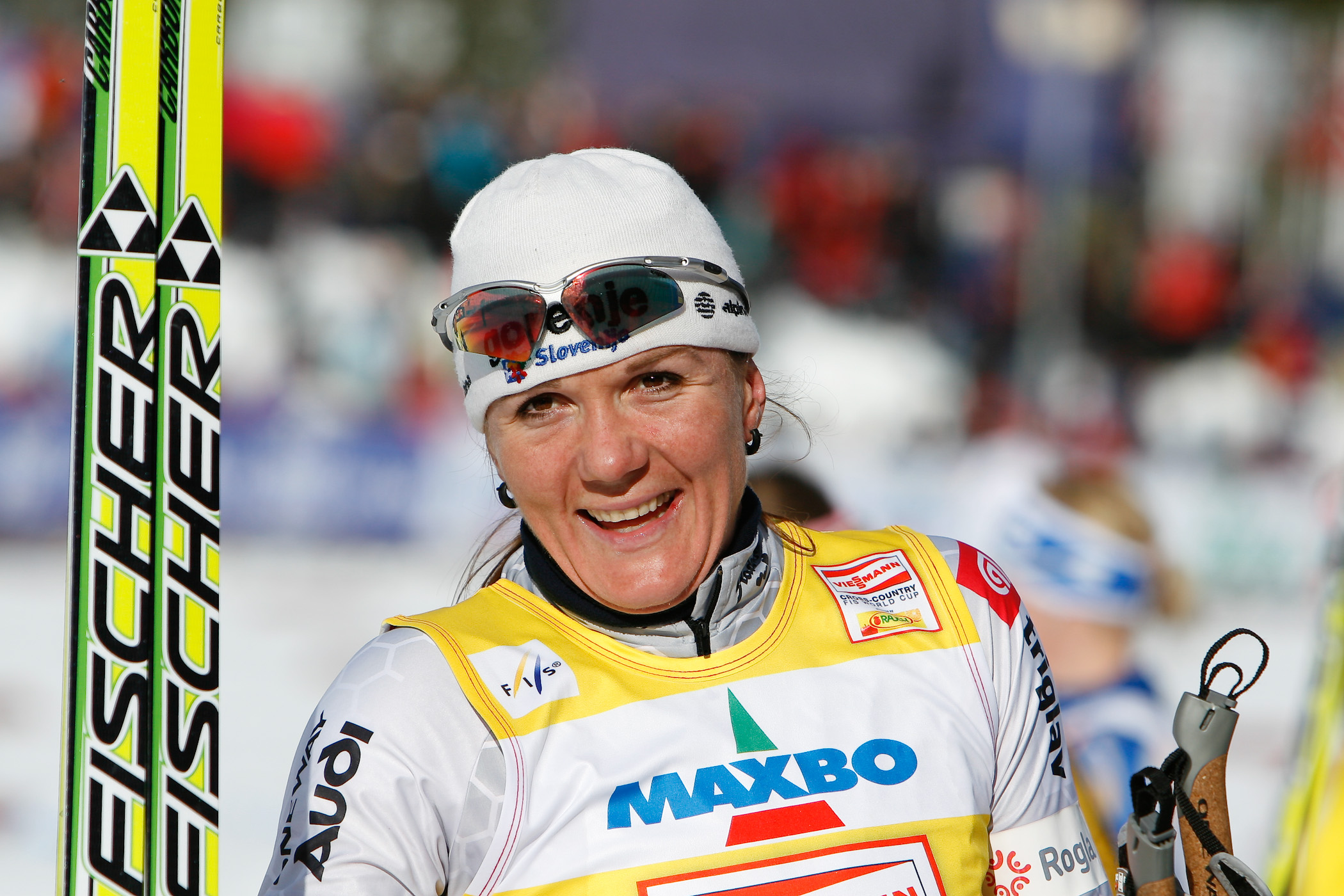
- Petra Majdic competing in 2009

Personal information
- Full name: Petra Majdič
- Born: 22 December 1979 (age 46) Ljubljana, SR Slovenia, SFR Yugoslavia
- Height: 1.78 m (5 ft 10 in)

Sport
- Sport: Skiing
- Club: ŠD Atrans Trojane

World Cup career
- Seasons: 13 – (1999–2011)
- Indiv. starts: 222
- Indiv. podiums: 49
- Indiv. wins: 24
- Team starts: 18
- Team podiums: 0
- Team wins: 0
- Overall titles: 0 – (2nd in 2009)
- Discipline titles: 3 – (3 SP)
Medal record
Women's cross-country skiing
Representing Slovenia
Olympic Games
Bronze medal – third place	2010 Vancouver	Individual sprint
World Championships
Silver medal – second place	2007 Sapporo	Individual sprint
Bronze medal – third place	2011 Oslo	Individual sprint
- Updated on 28 January 2018

Petra Majdič (born 22 December 1979) is a Slovenian former cross-country skier. Her best results came in classic style races. She won twenty-four World Cup races, twenty in sprint races, but she also won a marathon (30 km race) in Trondheim in 2009. She is the first Slovenian cross-country skier to win a World Cup race, the first to get a medal at the World Championships and the first to get an Olympic medal. With 20 wins, Majdič is the second-most successful sprinter in FIS Cross-Country World Cup history and with 24 wins in total she's the fourth-most successful World Cup competitor of all time.

== Career ==
She first appeared in World Cup on 9 January 1999 in Novo mesto, where she ended 10 km classic as 69th. In 2000, she won her first point in Falun with 30th place in 10 km freestyle. She showed talent for sprint events a year later in Asiago, where she earned her first podium for a 3rd-place finish in 1.5 km freestyle sprint. But real breakthrough came late for Majdič; after achieving two more podium finishes in 2002, she struggled for four years to make a major progress. Cross-country skiing was a marginal sport in Slovenia at that time and she was often frustrated about her training conditions and especially about her skis. As a skier from outside the World Cup elite and from a low-ranked country, she was unable to get the same quality skis as her competitors. The only way forward was even more hard work, as only top results could provide her with a chance to get equal terms with others. Her first victory came at the end of successful 2006 season in 1 km classic sprint of Drammen. First win, 3rd place in 45 km classic marathon of Mora and 9th place overall put Majdič in the spotlight for the first time, after so many years of hard work and little payback. She was recognized as the best female athlete in Slovenia and in the 2007 season she was finally able to compete on top skis and with an excellent support team, including a new coach and ski service team. She won three races and grabbed three more podium finishes to end season as 4th overall, 2nd in sprint and 8th in distance. Additionally, she earned a silver in the individual sprint at the 2007 FIS Nordic World Ski Championships. In the 2008 season, Majdič won her first World Cup title for sprints. In the 2009 season, she profiled herself as a serial winner, winning first four sprints of the season and eight sprints all together, but modified World Cup Finale rules prevented her from winning the World Cup overall. She won her second World Cup title for sprints, however, with a record 879 points and a record 409 points margin ahead of second-placed Arianna Follis.

=== 2010 Winter Olympics ===
During the warm-up for the 1.4 km classic sprint on 17 February in the 2010 Olympics she skied off-course, down a bank, into a 3 m (10 ft) deep gully where she crashed on rocks breaking both ski poles, a ski tip, and sustained five broken ribs along with a pneumothorax. The start time for her qualifying round was pushed back, but she collapsed in pain after qualifying and was taken to hospital to be x-rayed. The ultrasound failed to show the rib fractures. Thus, she returned to the course and, despite the agonizing pain, won her quarterfinal and just got through the semifinal as a lucky loser. During the semifinal, one of the broken ribs pierced her lung, collapsing it. Despite this and the excruciating pain, she finished third to win the bronze medal in the final, the first individual Winter Olympic medal for Slovenia in 16 years. She earned the highest praise from other skiers, staff and the media for her amazing bravery as she attended the medal giving ceremony with a tube in her chest to relieve pneumothorax. She said at the press conference afterward "Today, this is not a bronze. This is a gold with little diamonds on it".

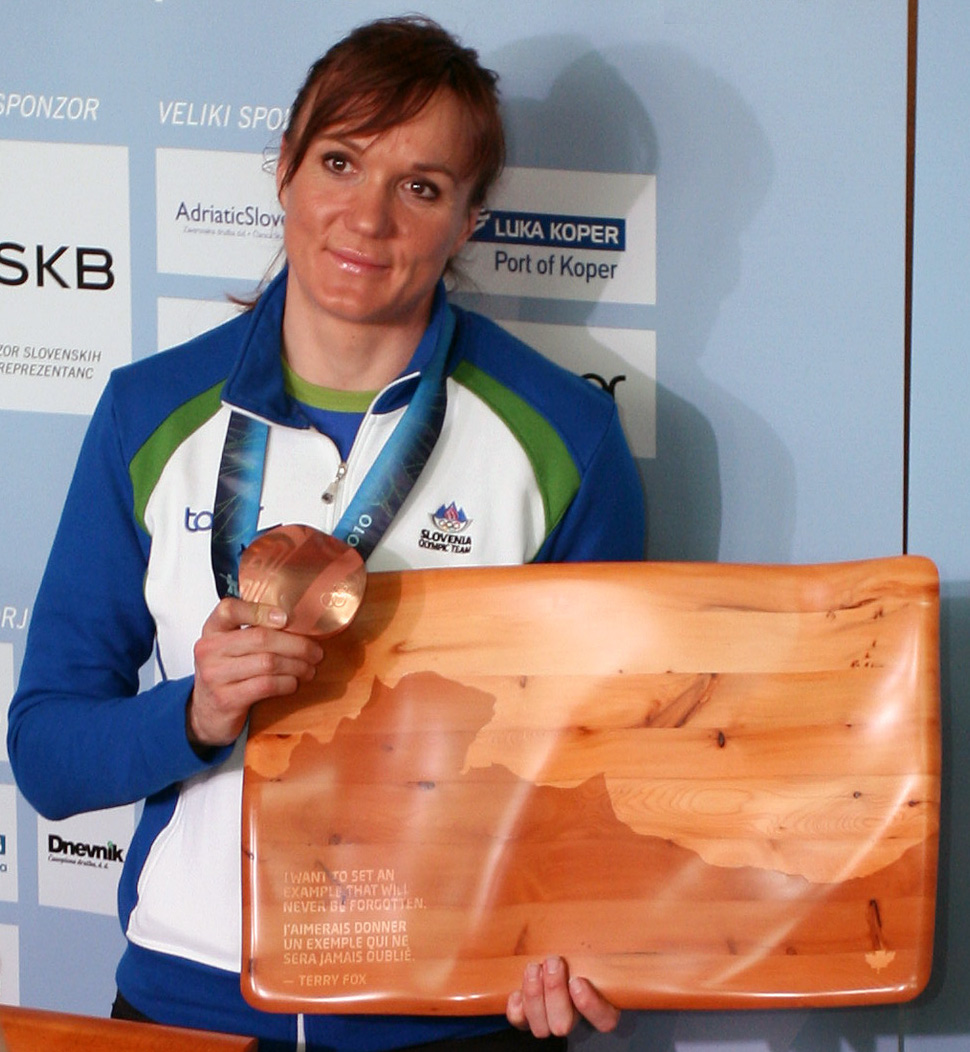
Petra Majdić with the Terry Fox Award

Two days after the race she was awarded with the Golden Order for Services by the President of Slovenia Danilo Türk. On February 26 it was announced that Petra Majdič and Joannie Rochette are the two Olympians to receive the Terry Fox Award, the purpose of which is to honour an Olympian, who touched the world with courage, humility and extraordinary athletic abilities at the 2010 Games.

After an inspiring Olympic performance, anecdotal factoids had appeared amongst her supporters, all including Majdič herself and Chuck Norris, a typical one being "When Chuck Norris can't go on, Petra Majdič perseveres!".

On 11 January 2011, she was proclaimed the Slovenian Woman of the Year for 2010. The award is conferred each year by the readers of Jana, the oldest women's magazine in Slovenia.

=== 2011 comeback ===
Due to the extent of her injury, many wrote Majdič off, while some were convinced that she would retire. Her coach Ivan Hudač persuaded her to continue with her career for at least another year and after a successful preparation period she was fit enough to start the 2010–11 season along with other top skiers. It took Majdič only two World Cup races to get back to the podium, she was second in 1.2 km classic sprint of Kuusamo. She was unable to win any races in November and December, but raised her form and won three races in January. She moved on to win a bronze medal in freestyle sprint of the FIS Nordic World Ski Championships 2011 in Oslo. She won yet another World Cup sprint in March, her twenty-fourth career win and third in Stockholm. With that win Majdič clinched her third Sprint title.

She retired from competitive skiing on 20 March 2011, wearing the "Goodbye, I love you" sign on her backside. Justyna Kowalczyk also appeared with a "Goodbye Petra" sign on her head during that same race.

== Cross-country skiing results ==
All results are sourced from the International Ski Federation (FIS).

=== Olympic Games ===
- 1 medal – (1 bronze)

Year	Age	10 km	15 km	Pursuit	30 km	Sprint	4 × 5 km relay	Team sprint
2002	22	6	—	7	12	—	9	—N/a
2006	26	6	—N/a	11	14	8	—	—
2010	30	—	—N/a	—	—	Bronze	—	—

=== World Championships ===
- 2 medals – (1 silver, 1 bronze)

Year	Age	5 km	10 km	15 km	Pursuit	30 km	Sprint	4 × 5 km relay	Team sprint
1999	19	59	—N/a	—	53	—	—	—	—N/a
2001	21	—N/a	17	14	32	—	—	11	—N/a
2003	23	—N/a	7	8	10	—	—	—	—N/a
2005	25	—N/a	—	—N/a	23	—	15	—	—
2007	27	—N/a	—	—N/a	16	5	Silver	—	9
2009	29	—N/a	15	—N/a	9	—	12	—	—
2011	31	—N/a	13	—N/a	—	—	Bronze	7	5

=== World Cup ===
==== Season titles ====
- 3 titles – (3 sprint)

Season
Season	Discipline
2008	Sprint
2009	Sprint
2011	Sprint

==== Season standings ====
Season	Age	Discipline standings					Ski Tour standings		
Season	Age	Overall	Distance	Long Distance	Middle Distance	Sprint	Nordic Opening	Tour de Ski	World Cup Final
1999	19	NC	—N/a	NC	—N/a	—	—N/a	—N/a	—N/a
2000	20	69	—N/a	NC	47	NC	—N/a	—N/a	—N/a
2001	21	34	—N/a	—N/a	—N/a	24	—N/a	—N/a	—N/a
2002	22	14	—N/a	—N/a	—N/a	9	—N/a	—N/a	—N/a
2003	23	14	—N/a	—N/a	—N/a	22	—N/a	—N/a	—N/a
2004	24	24	21	—N/a	—N/a	32	—N/a	—N/a	—N/a
2005	25	9	18	—N/a	—N/a	11	—N/a	—N/a	—N/a
2006	26	9	10	—N/a	—N/a	12	—N/a	—N/a	—N/a
2007	27	4	8	—N/a	—N/a	2nd place, silver medalist(s)	—N/a	6	—N/a
2008	28	5	14	—N/a	—N/a	1st place, gold medalist(s)	—N/a	18	13
2009	29	2nd place, silver medalist(s)	5	—N/a	—N/a	1st place, gold medalist(s)	—N/a	3rd place, bronze medalist(s)	12
2010	30	3rd place, bronze medalist(s)	8	—N/a	—N/a	3rd place, bronze medalist(s)	—N/a	2nd place, silver medalist(s)	—
2011	31	6	13	—N/a	—N/a	1st place, gold medalist(s)	7	6	9

==== Individual podiums ====
- 24 victories – (16 WC, 8 SWC)
- 49 podiums – (32 WC, 17 SWC)

No.	Season	Date	Location	Race	Level	Place
1	2000–01	1 February 2001	Asiago, Italy	1.5 km Sprint F	World Cup	3rd
2	2001–02	19 December 2001	Asiago, Italy	1.5 km Sprint C	World Cup	2nd
3	2001–02	5 March 2002	Stockholm, Sweden	1.5 km Sprint C	World Cup	2nd
4	2005–06	5 February 2006	Davos, Switzerland	10 km Individual C	World Cup	3rd
5	2005–06	4 March 2006	Mora, Sweden	45 km Mass Start C	World Cup	3rd
6	2005–06	9 March 2006	Drammen, Norway	1.0 km Sprint C	World Cup	1st
7	2006–07	25 November 2006	Rukatunturi, Finland	1.2 km Sprint C	World Cup	1st
8	2006–07	13 December 2006	Cogne, Italy	10 km Individual C	World Cup	2nd
9	2006–07	3 January 2007	Oberstdorf, Germany	10 km Individual C	Stage World Cup	1st
10	2006–07	14 March 2007	Drammen, Norway	1.0 km Sprint C	World Cup	2nd
11	2006–07	17 March 2007	Oslo, Norway	30 km Individual C	World Cup	3rd
12	2006–07	21 March 2007	Stockholm, Sweden	1.0 km Sprint C	World Cup	1st
13	2007–08	1 December 2007	Rukatunturi, Finland	1.2 km Sprint C	World Cup	1st
14	2007–08	23 January 2008	Canmore, Canada	1.2 km Sprint C	World Cup	1st
15	2007–08	10 February 2008	Otepää, Estonia	1.2 km Sprint C	World Cup	1st
16	2007–08	27 February 2008	Stockholm, Sweden	1.0 km Sprint C	World Cup	2nd
17	2007–08	5 March 2008	Drammen, Norway	1.0 km Sprint C	World Cup	2nd
18	2008–09	29 November 2008	Rukatunturi, Finland	1.2 km Sprint C	World Cup	1st
19	2008–09	14 December 2008	Davos, Switzerland	1.4 km Sprint F	World Cup	1st
20	2008–09	20 December 2008	Düsseldorf, Germany	0.8 km Sprint F	World Cup	1st
21	2008–09	27 December 2008	Oberhof, Germany	2.8 km Individual F	Stage World Cup	3rd
22	2008–09	29 December 2008	Prague, Czech Republic	1.3 km Sprint F	Stage World Cup	3rd
23	2008–09	1 January 2009	Nové Město, Czech Republic	1.2 km Sprint F	Stage World Cup	2nd
24	2008–09	3 January 2009	Val di Fiemme, Italy	10 km Mass Start C	Stage World Cup	2nd
25	2008–09	27 December 2008 – 4 January 2009	(Germany) (Czech Republic) (Italy) Tour de Ski	Overall Standings	World Cup	3rd
26	2008–09	25 January 2009	Otepää, Estonia	1.2 km Sprint C	World Cup	1st
27	2008–09	13 February 2009	Valdidentro, Italy	1.4 km Sprint F	World Cup	1st
28	2008–09	14 February 2009	Valdidentro, Italy	10 km C	World Cup	3rd
29	2008–09	7 March 2009	Lahti, Finland	1.2 km Sprint F	World Cup	1st
30	2008–09	12 March 2009	Trondheim, Norway	1.4 km Sprint C	World Cup	1st
31	2008–09	14 March 2009	Trondheim, Norway	30 km Mass Start C	World Cup	1st
32	2008–09	12 March 2009	Stockholm, Sweden	1.0 km Sprint C	Stage World Cup	1st
33	2009–10	28 November 2009	Rukatunturi, Finland	1.2 km Sprint C	World Cup	2nd
34	2009–10	13 December 2009	Davos, Switzerland	1.0 km Sprint F	World Cup	1st
35	2009–10	19 December 2009	Rogla, Slovenia	1.0 km Sprint C	World Cup	3rd
36	2009–10	1 January 2010	Oberhof, Germany	2.8 km Individual F	Stage World Cup	1st
37	2009–10	3 January 2010	Oberhof, Germany	1.6 km Sprint C	Stage World Cup	1st
38	2009–10	6 January 2010	Cortina–Toblach, Italy	16 km Pursuit F	Stage World Cup	2nd
39	2009–10	7 January 2010	Cortina–Toblach, Italy	5 km Individual C	Stage World Cup	3rd
40	2009–10	3 January 2010	Val di Fiemme, Italy	10 km Mass Start C	Stage World Cup	1st
41	2009–10	1–10 January 2010	(Germany) (Czech Republic) (Italy) Tour de Ski	Overall Standings	World Cup	2nd
42	2009–10	17 January 2010	Otepää, Estonia	1.2 km Sprint C	Stage World Cup	2nd
43	2010–11	26 November 2010	Rukatunturi, Finland	1.2 km Sprint C	Stage World Cup	2nd
44	2010–11	27 November 2010	Rukatunturi, Finland	5 km Individual C	Stage World Cup	3rd
45	2010–11	2 January 2011	Oberstdorf, Germany	1.2 km Sprint C	Stage World Cup	1st
46	2010–11	5 January 2011	Toblach, Italy	1.3 km Sprint F	Stage World Cup	1st
47	2010–11	23 January 2011	Otepää, Estonia	1.2 km Sprint C	World Cup	1st
48	2010–11	13 March 2011	Lahti, Finland	1.4 km Sprint C	World Cup	3rd
49	2010–11	16 March 2011	Stockholm, Sweden	1.0 km Sprint C	Stage World Cup	1st
