= Silvia Rupil =

Italian cross-country skier (born 1985)

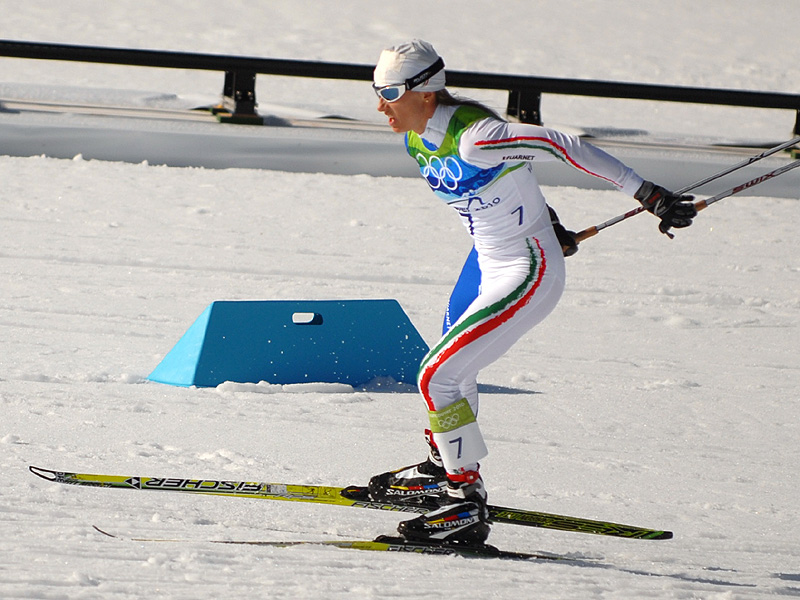
- Silvia Rupil in 2010

Personal information
- Nationality: Italy
- Born: 15 May 1985 (age 41) Gemona del Friuli, Italy

Sport
- Sport: Skiing
- Club: G.S. Fiamme Gialle

World Cup career
- Seasons: 6 – (2007–2012)
- Indiv. starts: 49
- Indiv. podiums: 0
- Team starts: 6
- Team podiums: 3
- Team wins: 1
- Overall titles: 0 – (48th in 2011)
- Discipline titles: 0

Silvia Rupil (born 15 May 1985) is an Italian cross-country skier. She has competed in the World Cup since 2006, and competed in the 2009-10 Tour de Ski and the 2010 Winter Olympics. Her best World Cup result is a sixth place at a 6 km freestyle event in Canmore in 2010. In her Olympic debut, Rupil finished fourth in the relay, 14th in the 10 km freestyle event, and 16th in the 7.5 km + 7.5 km double pursuit event.

== Cross-country skiing results ==
All results are sourced from the International Ski Federation (FIS).

=== Olympic Games ===
Year	Age	10 km individual	15 km skiathlon	30 km mass start	Sprint	4 × 5 km relay	Team sprint
2010	24	14	16	—	—	4	—

=== World Championships ===
Year	Age	10 km individual	15 km skiathlon	30 km mass start	Sprint	4 × 5 km relay	Team sprint
2011	25	—	—	DNF	—	4	—

=== World Cup ===
==== Season standings ====
Season	Age	Discipline standings			Ski Tour standings		
Season	Age	Overall	Distance	Sprint	Nordic Opening	Tour de Ski	World Cup Final
2007	21	NC	NC	—	—N/a	—	—N/a
2008	22	NC	NC	—	—N/a	—	—
2009	23	NC	NC	NC	—N/a	—	45
2010	24	69	41	NC	—N/a	DNF	—
2011	25	48	29	NC	DNF	DNF	38
2012	26	73	55	NC	60	DNF	—

==== Team podiums ====
- 1 victory – (1 RL)
- 3 podiums – (3 RL)

No.	Season	Date	Location	Race	Level	Place	Teammates
1	2010–11	21 November 2010	Gällivare, Sweden	4 × 5 km Relay C/F	World Cup	3rd	Genuin / Longa / Follis
2	2010–11	19 December 2010	La Clusaz, France	4 × 5 km Relay C/F	World Cup	2nd	De Martin Topranin / Longa / Follis
3	2010–11	6 February 2011	Rybinsk, Russia	4 × 5 km Relay C/F	World Cup	1st	Genuin / Longa / Follis
