= Marianna Longa =

Italian cross-country skier (born 1979)

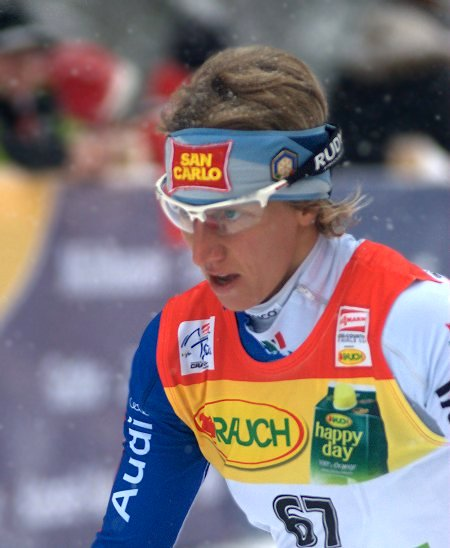
- Marianna Longa in 2010

Personal information
- Nationality: Italy
- Born: 26 August 1979 (age 46) Tirano, Italy

Sport
- Sport: Skiing
- Club: G.S. Fiamme Gialle

World Cup career
- Seasons: 11 – (2000–2005, 2007–2011)
- Indiv. starts: 134
- Indiv. podiums: 9
- Indiv. wins: 1
- Team starts: 24
- Team podiums: 6
- Team wins: 1
- Overall titles: 0 – (6th in 2009)
- Discipline titles: 0
Medal record
Women's cross-country skiing
Representing Italy
World Championships
Silver medal – second place	2009 Liberec	10 km classical
Bronze medal – third place	2009 Liberec	Team sprint
Junior World Championships
Gold medal – first place	1997 Canmore	4 × 5 km relay
Bronze medal – third place	1999 Saafelden	5 km classical

Marianna Longa (born 26 August 1979 in Tirano) is an Italian cross-country skier from Livigno. She started her professional career in 1997, and her first appearance in a World Cup race was on 17 March 2000 in Bormio. Longa is currently part of the Fiamme Gialle, and the Italian cross-country national team. Longa is also a strong runner. She retired from cross-country skiing after the 2010–11 season.

== Biography ==
=== Early life ===
In the early ages she excelled in all the major national, and international races. She approached the professional level at the age of 18, in 1997. In her first year, she obtained ninth place in the 5 km freestyle, at the 1997 FIS Junior World Ski Championships in Canmore, Canada.

In 1999, she achieved a podium position at the FIS Junior World Ski Championships in Saalfelden, Austria with a 3rd place in the 5 km C, a race where athletes like Marit Bjørgen, Petra Majdič, and Aino-Kaisa Saarinen were also competing. Longa also earned great results in the Continental Cup, including the win at the 5 km classical stage in Candanchu, Spain where she preceded Majdič|.

=== World Cup debut ===
Between 2000 and 2001 she was competing in both the Continental Cup, and the World Cup. The top result was a second position in the 5 km classical in Schonach, Germany in the Continental Cup. She ended the 2001 season in 85th position in the overall World Cup standings.

=== Winter Olympics and World Ski Championships Debuts ===
In the 2002 Winter Olympics, in Salt Lake City, at the age of 22, she obtained 6th position in the 4 × 5 km relay, and a 20th position in the 10 km classical. She ended the 2002 season in 80th position in the World Cup overall standings

In the 2003 World Ski Championships, in Val di Fiemme, she finished 7th in the 4 × 5 km relay and 11th in the 15 km C Mass start. Longa ended the 2003 season in 51st position in the world cup overall standing achieving a 7th place in the 10 km classical mass start as top result.

=== Pregnancy and return to competitions 2004–2008 ===
Between 2004 and 2006 she did not obtain major results as a consequence of her pregnancy, announced in February 2005. In the 2007 World Ski Championship, in Sapporo, Japan, she obtained eight position in the 15 km M Pursuit, and sixth in the 4 × 5 km relay. Her best individual result in 2007 is a fifth-place in the 10 km classical in Otepaeae, Estonia. She ended the season with an overall 19th position in the world cup standing. In March 2007, she retired, at the end of her best world cup season so far. Although the decision to retire was made one year earlier, Longa made her comeback already in March 2008.

Longa had a brilliant start on returning to competition, with a fifth place on the 10 km classical World Cup in Lathi, Finland. The 2008 also brought a fourth place on the 10 km classical, and a fifth place on the 10 km freestyle pursuit in the World Cup Finals in Bormio. In the summer of 2008 she also competed in roller skiing races to speed-up her recovery, obtaining a victory, two seconds and a fourth place.

=== From 2009 ===
On 30 January 2009 she won her first world cup race in Rybinsk, Russia on the 10 km F Mass start. A month after, she won two medals at the 2009 FIS Nordic World Ski Championship in Liberec with a silver in the 10 km C and bronze in the team sprint C event. She finished the 2009 season in sixth position in the overall World Cup Standings.

In the 2010 Winter Olympics in Vancouver, she earned fourth place in the relay 4 × 5 km relay, seventh place in the 15 km pursuit, and eleventh in the 30 km classical. She ended the 2010 World Cup season in ninth position in the overall standings, with the major World Cup results of a third in Lahti in the 4 × 5 km relay, and a fourth place in the 10 km classical in Rukatunturi, Finland

In January 2011 she obtained third place in the 2010-11 Tour de Ski, arriving third on the final climb finish in Val di Fiemme, following Justyna Kowalczyk and Therese Johaug. The 2011 season brought several good results in all the different disciplines, with a total of six podium positions in World Cup races, and three podium positions in Stage World Cup races.

=== 2011 World Championships, Oslo ===
Longa did not compete at the starting race in the world championship, the sprint won by Marit Bjørgen. She took start at the 15 km pursuit and finished 5th, following Bjørgen, Justyna Kowalczyk, Therese Johaug and Charlotte Kalla. At the 10 km classical she finished seventh. Longa also participated at the Team Sprint, completing the Italian team together with Arianna Follis. They secured the fourth position, following in order of Sweden, Finland and Norway. In the relay 4 × 5 km relay, together with Follis, Antonella Confortola and Silvia Rupil, Longa secured the fourth position, with a start that saw her in the first place after her fraction. On the last race, the 30 km, she obtained the eight position in a spectacular day, where Johaug offered an outstanding performance securing the gold medal ahead of Bjørgen and Kowalczyk.

== Cross-country skiing results ==
All results are sourced from the International Ski Federation (FIS).

=== Olympic Games ===
Year	Age	10 km	15 km	Pursuit	30 km	Sprint	4 × 5 km relay	Team sprint
2002	22	20	—	—	33	—	6	—N/a
2010	30	18	—N/a	7	11	—	4	—

=== World Championships ===
- 2 medals – (1 silver, 1 bronze)

Year	Age	10 km	15 km	Pursuit	30 km	Sprint	4 × 5 km relay	Team sprint
2003	23	20	11	—	—	—	7	—N/a
2007	27	—	—N/a	8	19	39	6	—
2009	29	Silver	—N/a	4	9	—	5	Bronze
2011	31	7	—N/a	5	8	—	4	4

=== World Cup ===
==== Season standings ====
Season	Age	Discipline standings					Ski Tour standings		
Season	Age	Overall	Distance	Long Distance	Middle Distance	Sprint	Nordic Opening	Tour de Ski	World Cup Final
2000	20	NC	—N/a	—	NC	—	—N/a	—N/a	—N/a
2001	21	85	—N/a	—N/a	—N/a	59	—N/a	—N/a	—N/a
2002	22	80	—N/a	—N/a	—N/a	57	—N/a	—N/a	—N/a
2003	23	51	—N/a	—N/a	—N/a	—	—N/a	—N/a	—N/a
2004	24	55	38	—N/a	—N/a	—	—N/a	—N/a	—N/a
2005	25	69	45	—N/a	—N/a	—	—N/a	—N/a	—N/a
2007	27	19	13	—N/a	—N/a	51	—N/a	15	—N/a
2008	28	34	26	—N/a	—N/a	51	—N/a	—	5
2009	29	6	3rd place, bronze medalist(s)	—N/a	—N/a	20	—N/a	5	13
2010	30	9	10	—N/a	—N/a	26	—N/a	8	16
2011	31	7	4	—N/a	—N/a	13	8	3rd place, bronze medalist(s)	DNF

==== Individual podiums ====
- 1 victory – (1 WC)
- 9 podiums – (5 WC, 4 SWC)

No.	Season	Date	Location	Race	Level	Place
1	2008–09	17 January 2009	Whistler, Canada	7.5 km + 7.5 km Pursuit C/F	World Cup	2nd
2	2008–09	30 January 2009	Rybinsk, Russia	10 km Mass Start F	World Cup	1st
3	2008–09	14 February 2009	Valdidentro, Italy	10 km Individual C	World Cup	2nd
4	2009–10	9 January 2010	Val di Fiemme, Italy	10 km Mass Start C	Stage World Cup	3rd
5	2010–11	1 January 2011	Oberhof, Germany	10 km Pursuit C	Stage World Cup	3rd
6	2010–11	6 January 2011	Toblach, Italy	15 km Pursuit F	Stage World Cup	3rd
7	2010–11	8 January 2011	Val di Fiemme, Italy	10 km Mass Start C	Stage World Cup	3rd
8	2010–11	31 December 2010 – 9 January 2011	(Germany) (Italy) Tour de Ski	Overall Standings	World Cup	3rd
9	2010–11	4 February 2011	Rybinsk, Russia	5 km + 5 km Pursuit C/F	World Cup	2nd

==== Team podiums ====
- 1 victory – (1 RL)
- 6 podiums – (5 RL, 1 TS)

No.	Season	Date	Location	Race	Level	Place	Teammate(s)
1	2003–04	7 February 2004	La Clusaz, France	4 × 5 km Relay C/F	World Cup	3rd	Paruzzi / Confortola / Valbusa
2	2009–10	7 March 2010	Lahti, Finland	4 × 5 km Relay C/F	World Cup	3rd	Confortola / Valbusa / Follis
3	2010–11	21 November 2010	Gällivare, Sweden	4 × 5 km Relay C/F	World Cup	3rd	Genuin / Rupil / Follis
4	2010–11	19 December 2010	La Clusaz, France	4 × 5 km Relay C/F	World Cup	2nd	De Martin Topranin / Rupil / Follis
5	2010–11	16 January 2011	Liberec, Czech Republic	6 × 1.3 km Team Sprint C	World Cup	2nd	Genuin
6	2010–11	6 February 2011	Rybinsk, Russia	4 × 5 km Relay C/F	World Cup	1st	Genuin / Rupil / Follis
