= Virginia De Martin Topranin =

Italian cross-country skier

Personal information
- Nationality: Italy
- Born: 20 August 1987 (age 38) Innichen, Italy

Sport
- Sport: Skiing
- Club: C.S. Carabinieri

World Cup career
- Seasons: 8 – (2011–2018)
- Indiv. starts: 132
- Indiv. podiums: 0
- Team starts: 11
- Team podiums: 1
- Team wins: 0
- Overall titles: 0 – (28th in 2016)
- Discipline titles: 0
- Updated on 18 January 2019

Virginia De Martin Topranin (born 20 August 1987) is an Italian cross-country skier. She competed at the FIS Nordic World Ski Championships 2013 in Val di Fiemme. She competed at the 2014 Winter Olympics in Sochi, in 15 kilometre skiathlon, and was part of the Italian team that placed eighth in the relay.

== Cross-country skiing results ==
All results are sourced from the International Ski Federation (FIS).

=== Olympic games ===
Year	Age	10 km individual	15 km skiathlon	30 km mass start	Sprint	4 × 5 km relay	Team sprint
2014	26	—	43	—	—	7	—

=== World championships ===
Year	Age	10 km individual	15 km skiathlon	30 km mass start	Sprint	4 × 5 km relay	Team sprint
2011	23	34	35	—	—	—	—
2013	25	—	19	20	—	8	—
2015	27	—	25	24	—	9	—
2017	29	41	32	—	—	—	—

=== World Cup ===
Season	Age	Discipline standings			Ski Tour standings			
Season	Age	Overall	Distance	Sprint	Nordic Opening	Tour de Ski	World Cup Final	Ski Tour Canada
2011	24	56	47	NC	40	24	—	—N/a
2012	25	48	37	NC	43	17	26	—N/a
2013	26	38	30	NC	34	24	20	—N/a
2014	27	98	85	64	73	DNF	—	—N/a
2015	28	68	63	NC	66	23	—N/a	—N/a
2016	29	28	26	NC	33	17	—N/a	22
2017	30	66	55	NC	49	24	—	—N/a
2018	31	NC	NC	—	—	—	—	—N/a

==== Team podiums ====
- 1 podium

No.	Season	Date	Location	Race	Level	Place	Teammates
1	2010–11	19 December 2010	La Clusaz, France	4 × 5 km Relay C/F	World Cup	2nd	Longa / Rupil / Follis
