= Magda Genuin =

Italian cross-country skier

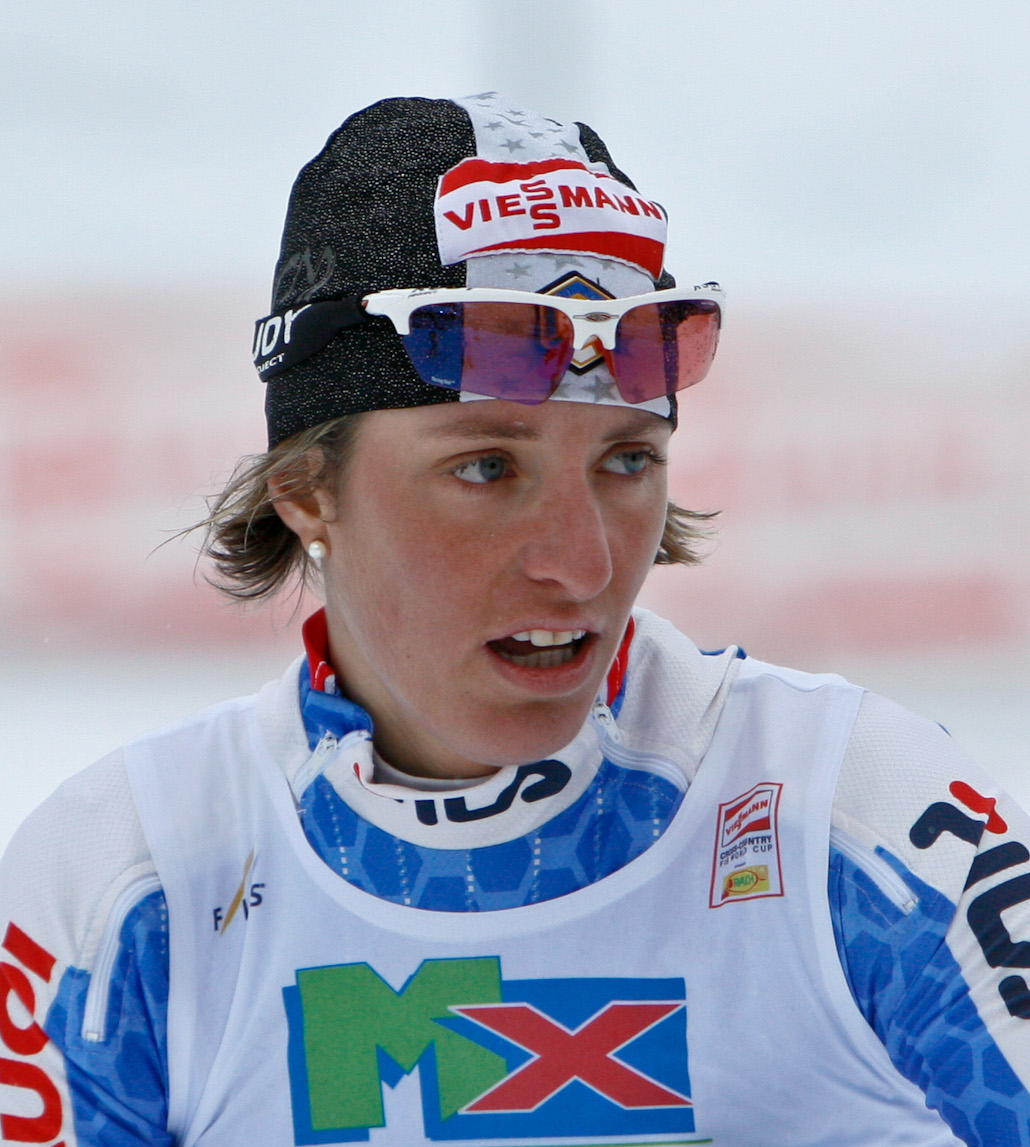
- Genuin in Trondheim, March 2009

Personal information
- Nationality: Italy
- Born: 17 June 1979 (age 47) Agordo, Italy

Sport
- Sport: Skiing
- Club: Centro Sportivo Esercito

World Cup career
- Seasons: 2000–2011
- Indiv. starts: 150
- Indiv. podiums: 5
- Indiv. wins: 0
- Team starts: 27
- Team podiums: 7
- Team wins: 4
- Overall titles: 0 – (21st in 2009)
- Discipline titles: 0

Magda Genuin (born 17 June 1979 in Agordo) is an Italian cross-country skier who competed from 1997 to 2011.

== Biography ==
She finished sixth in the 4 × 5 km relay at the 2007 FIS Nordic World Ski Championships in Sapporo and earned her best individual finish of 12th in the 10 km event at those same championships.

Genuin's best individual finish at the Winter Olympics was fifth in individual sprint at Vancouver in 2010.

She has a total of eight individual victories at various levels at various distances up to 10 km since 2000. Genuin's best individual World Cup finish was second in Rybinsk in 2010.

== Cross-country skiing results ==
All results are sourced from the International Ski Federation (FIS).

=== Olympic Games ===
Year	Age	10 km	15 km	Pursuit	30 km	Sprint	4 × 5 km relay	Team sprint
2002	22	—	—	—	—	22	—	—N/a
2006	26	48	—N/a	—	—	19	—	—
2010	30	—	—N/a	—	—	5	—	4

=== World Championships ===
Year	Age	10 km	15 km	Pursuit	30 km	Sprint	4 × 5 km relay	Team sprint
2003	23	42	—	38	—	17	—	—N/a
2007	27	12	—N/a	—	—	28	6	—
2009	29	—	—N/a	—	—	13	—	—
2011	31	—	—N/a	—	—	17	—	—

=== World Cup ===
==== Season standings ====
Season	Age	Discipline standings					Ski Tour standings		
Season	Age	Overall	Distance	Long Distance	Middle Distance	Sprint	Nordic Opening	Tour de Ski	World Cup Final
2000	20	NC	—N/a	—	NC	—	—N/a	—N/a	—N/a
2001	21	78	—N/a	—N/a	—N/a	54	—N/a	—N/a	—N/a
2002	22	52	—N/a	—N/a	—N/a	32	—N/a	—N/a	—N/a
2003	23	70	—N/a	—N/a	—N/a	49	—N/a	—N/a	—N/a
2004	24	50	65	—N/a	—N/a	28	—N/a	—N/a	—N/a
2005	25	86	NC	—N/a	—N/a	64	—N/a	—N/a	—N/a
2006	26	62	91	—N/a	—N/a	37	—N/a	—N/a	—N/a
2007	27	48	64	—N/a	—N/a	31	—N/a	40	—N/a
2008	28	29	53	—N/a	—N/a	14	—N/a	30	48
2009	29	21	81	—N/a	—N/a	7	—N/a	29	DNF
2010	30	28	56	—N/a	—N/a	9	—N/a	23	DNF
2011	31	27	45	—N/a	—N/a	11	20	DNF	DNF

=== Individual podiums ===
- 5 podiums – (4 WC, 1 SWC)

No.	Season	Date	Location	Race	Level	Place
1	2007–08	26 January 2008	Canmore, Canada	1.1 km Sprint F	World Cup	3rd
2	2008–09	31 January 2009	Rybinsk, Russia	1.3 km Sprint F	World Cup	3rd
3	2008–09	13 February 2009	Valdidentro, Italy	1.4 km Sprint F	World Cup	3rd
4	2009–10	22 January 2010	Rybinsk, Russia	1.3 km Sprint F	World Cup	2nd
5	2010–11	5 January 2011	Toblach, Italy	1.3 km Sprint F	Stage World Cup	3rd

=== Team podiums ===
- 4 victories – (1 RL, 3 TS)
- 7 podiums – (3 RL, 4 TS)

No.	Season	Date	Location	Race	Leve	Place	Teammate(s)
1	2002–03	24 November 2002	Kiruna, Sweden	4 × 5 km Relay C/F	World Cup	3rd	Paruzzi / Follis / Valbusa
2	2008–09	18 January 2009	Whistler, Canada	6 × 1.3 km Team Sprint F	World Cup	1st	Follis
3	2009–10	6 December 2009	Düsseldorf, Germany	6 × 0.8 km Team Sprint F	World Cup	1st	Follis
4	2010–11	21 November 2010	Gällivare, Sweden	4 × 5 km Relay C/F	World Cup	3rd	Longa / Rupil / Follis
5	2010–11	5 December 2010	Düsseldorf, Germany	6 × 0.9 km Team Sprint F	World Cup	1st	Follis
6	2010–11	16 January 2011	Liberec, Czech Republic	6 × 1.3 km Team Sprint C	World Cup	2nd	Longa
7	2010–11	6 February 2011	Rybinsk, Russia	4 × 5 km Relay C/F	World Cup	1st	Longa / Rupil / Follis

== Italian Championships ==
- 2002: 1st, Italian women's championships of cross-country skiing, sprint
- 2003: 3rd, Italian women's championships of cross-country skiing, sprint
- 2004: 2nd, Italian women's championships of cross-country skiing, 5 km
- 2005:
  - 2nd, Italian women's championships of cross-country skiing, 7.5 km free
  - 3rnd, Italian women's championships of cross-country skiing, 7.5 km classic
- 2007:
  - 2nd, Italian women's championships of cross-country skiing, 10 km
  - 2nd, Italian women's championships of cross-country skiing, sprint
- 2009: 1st, Italian women's championships of cross-country skiing, sprint
- 2010:
  - 1st, Italian women's championships of cross-country skiing, sprint
  - 3rd, Italian women's championships of cross-country skiing, 10 km
- 2011:
  - 1st, Italian women's championships of cross-country skiing, sprint
  - 2nd, Italian women's championships of cross-country skiing, 2 × 7.5 km pursuit
  - 3rd, Italian women's championships of cross-country skiing, 5 km
