= 2009–10 Tour de Ski =

Cross-country skiing event

Tour de Ski
2009–10 FIS Cross-Country World Cup

Ski tour details
- Venue(s): Oberhof, Germany; Prague, Czech Republic; Cortina d'Ampezzo, Italy; Toblach, Italy; Val di Fiemme, Italy
- Dates: 1 January 2010 – 10 January 2010
- Stages: 8

Results
Men
Jersey awarded to the men's overall winner	Winner	Lukáš Bauer (CZE)
	Second	Petter Northug (NOR)
	Third	Dario Cologna (SUI)
Jersey awarded to the men's sprint classification winner	Sprint	Petter Northug (NOR)
Women
Jersey awarded to the women's overall winner	Winner	Justyna Kowalczyk (POL)
	Second	Petra Majdič (SLO)
	Third	Arianna Follis (ITA)
Jersey awarded to the women's sprint classification winner	Sprint	Petra Majdič (SLO)

The 2009–10 Tour de Ski was the 4th edition of the Tour de Ski and took place 1–10 January 2010. The race started in Oberhof, Germany, and ended in Val di Fiemme, Italy. The defending champions was Switzerland's Dario Cologna for the men and Finland's Virpi Kuitunen for the women. This year's event was won by Lukáš Bauer of the Czech Republic for the men and Poland's Justyna Kowalczyk for the women.

== Final standings ==
Legend
Denotes the winner of the Overall standings	Denotes the winner of the Sprint standings

=== Overall standings ===
==== Men ====
Final overall standings (1–10)
Rank	Name	Time
1	Lukáš Bauer (CZE)	4:13:10.6
2	Petter Northug (NOR)	+1:16.4
3	Dario Cologna (SUI)	+1:32.2
4	Marcus Hellner (SWE)	+1:41.4
5	Jean-Marc Gaillard (FRA)	+1:52.6
6	René Sommerfeldt (GER)	+3:01.4
7	Axel Teichmann (GER)	+3:08.0
8	Daniel Rickardsson (SWE)	+3:16.3
9	Ivan Babikov (CAN)	+3:31.8
10	Giorgio Di Centa (ITA)	+3:38.4

Final overall standings (11–39)
Rank	Name	Time
11	Jens Filbrich (GER)	+4:10.2
12	Matti Heikkinen (FIN)	+4:18.5
13	Tord Asle Gjerdalen (NOR)	+4:49.3
14	Valerio Checchi (ITA)	+5:01.8
15	Curdin Perl (SUI)	+5:19.4
16	Devon Kershaw (CAN)	+5:36.9
17	Tom Reichelt (GER)	+6:00.1
18	Vincent Vittoz (FRA)	+6:15.9
19	Maurice Manificat (FRA)	+6:32.0
20	Martin Johnsrud Sundby (NOR)	+7:18.3
21	Roland Clara (ITA)	+7:55.9
22	Alex Harvey (CAN)	+7:58.2
23	Ville Nousiainen (FIN)	+8:13.4
24	Ilia Chernousov (RUS)	+8:57.7
25	Simen Østensen (NOR)	+9:10.2
26	Sergey Turyshev (RUS)	+9:56.9
27	Nikolay Chebotko (KAZ)	+10:04.5
28	Martin Koukal (CZE)	+11:16.2
29	Sergey Shiryayev (RUS)	+11:28.4
30	Yevgeniy Velichko (KAZ)	+11:37.7
31	Jiří Magál (CZE)	+11:47.0
32	Fabio Pasini (ITA)	+11:57.6
33	Thomas Moriggl (ITA)	+12:22.6
34	Sergey Cherepanov (KAZ)	+13:18.0
35	Robin Duvillard (FRA)	+15:21.2
36	Roman Leybyuk (UKR)	+20:11.6
37	Milan Šperl (CZE)	+20:12.9
38	Yevgeniy Koschevoy (KAZ)	+23:55.6
39	Alexander Osipov (KAZ)	+27:09.5

==== Women ====
Final overall standings (1–10)
Rank	Name	Time
1	Justyna Kowalczyk (POL)	2:37:49.5
2	Petra Majdič (SLO)	+24.2
3	Arianna Follis (ITA)	+1:17.2
4	Aino-Kaisa Saarinen (FIN)	+1:39.7
5	Kristin Størmer Steira (NOR)	+2:08.1
6	Riitta-Liisa Roponen (FIN)	+2:31.2
7	Olga Zavyalova (RUS)	+3:25.3
8	Marianna Longa (ITA)	+3:26.6
9	Katrin Zeller (GER)	+4:50.9
10	Marthe Kristoffersen (NOR)	+5:07.9

Final overall standings (11–41)
Rank	Name	Time
11	Yevgeniya Medvedeva (RUS)	+5:16.4
12	Yuliya Chekalyova (RUS)	+5:25.1
13	Olga Schuchkina (RUS)	+5:34.4
14	Riikka Sarasoja (FIN)	+5:47.6
15	Karine Laurent Philippot (FRA)	+6:07.3
16	Sara Renner (CAN)	+6:23.0
17	Elena Kolomina (KAZ)	+6:26.4
18	Sabina Valbusa (ITA)	+6:26.5
19	Valentyna Shevchenko (UKR)	+6:31.3
20	Kamila Rajdlová (CZE)	+7:06.6
21	Svetlana Malahova-Shishkina (KAZ)	+7:24.1
22	Eva Nývltová (CZE)	+7:30.2
23	Magda Genuin (ITA)	+7:48.8
24	Ivana Janečková (CZE)	+7:59.2
25	Valentyna Novikova (RUS)	+8:21.1
26	Britta Johansson Norgren (SWE)	+8:42.0
27	Elisa Brocard (ITA)	+8:43.6
28	Natalya Ilyana (RUS)	+9:01.9
29	Lisa Larsen (SWE)	+9:09.7
30	Olga Vasiljonok (BLR)	+9:14.9
31	Emilie Vina (FRA)	+10:03.6
32	Cécile Storti (FRA)	+10:18.9
33	Oxana Yatskaya (KAZ)	+10:40.4
34	Célia Bourgeois (FRA)	+11:15.2
35	Magdalena Pajala (SWE)	+11:33.4
36	Lada Nesterenko (UKR)	+12:11.3
37	Nastasia Dubarezava (BLR)	+12:42.2
38	Marina Matrosova (KAZ)	+12:43.2
39	Vita Yakymchuk (UKR)	+13:01.2
40	Coraline Hugue (FRA)	+15:21.1
41	Tatyana Roshina (KAZ)	+15:24.8

- Alyona Sidko (Russia) finished 9th but was later disqualified after she tested positive for recombinant erythropoietin (EPO).

=== Sprint standings ===
==== Men ====
Final sprint standings (1–10)
Rank	Name	Time
1	Petter Northug (NOR)	2:16
2	Simen Østensen (NOR)	1:39
3	Marcus Hellner (SWE)	1:22
4	Dario Cologna (SUI)	1:11
5	Axel Teichmann (GER)	1:02
6	Lukáš Bauer (CZE)	1:00
7	Martin Koukal (CZE)	0:48
8	Maurice Manificat (FRA)	0:38
9	Yevgeniy Koschevoy (KAZ)	0:37
10	Jean-Marc Gaillard (FRA)	0:34

==== Women ====
Final sprint standings (1–10)
Rank	Name	Time
1	Petra Majdič (SLO)	2:40
2	Arianna Follis (ITA)	1:36
3	Aino-Kaisa Saarinen (FIN)	1:36
4	Justyna Kowalczyk (POL)	1:33
5	Valentina Novikova (RUS)	0:55
6	Kristin Størmer Steira (NOR)	0:54
7	Marianna Longa (ITA)	0:50
8	Britta Johansson Norgren (SWE)	0:50
9	Magda Genuin (ITA)	0:50
10	Magdalena Pajala (SWE)	0:46

== Stages ==
=== Stage 1 ===
1 January 2010, Oberhof, Germany - prologue

Men - 3.75 km freestyle
Place	Name	Time
1	Petter Northug (NOR)	7:37.4
2	Marcus Hellner (SWE)	+ 0.8
3	Axel Teichmann (GER)	+ 2.0
4	Dario Cologna (SUI)	+ 2.5
5	Sergey Shiryayev (RUS)	+ 5.2
6	Loris Frasnelli (ITA)	+ 6.2
7	Lukáš Bauer (CZE)	+ 7.1
8	Jean Marc Gaillard (FRA)	+ 7.7
9	Jesper Modin (SWE)	+ 9.7
9	Alexander Legkov (RUS)	+ 9.7

Women - 2.5 km freestyle
Place	Name	Time
1	Petra Majdič (SLO)	6:35.3
2	Natalya Korostelyova (RUS)	+ 2.1
3	Justyna Kowalczyk (POL)	+ 6.3
4	Arianna Follis (ITA)	+ 7.0
5	Miriam Gössner (GER)	+12.7
6	Aino-Kaisa Saarinen (FIN)	+15.5
7	Celine Brun-Lie (NOR)	+15.7
8	Riitta-Liisa Roponen (FIN)	+16.2
9	Kristin Størmer Steira (NOR)	+16.4
10	Hanna Brodin (SWE)	+17.6

=== Stage 2 ===
2 January 2010, Oberhof - distance (handicap start)

Men - 15 km classical
Place	Name	Time
1	Petter Northug (NOR)	39:45.8
2	Maxim Vylegzhanin (RUS)	+ 0.1
3	Matti Heikkinen (FIN)	+ 0.7
4	Lukáš Bauer (CZE)	+ 2.4
5	Tobias Angerer (GER)	+ 3.0
6	Axel Teichmann (GER)	+ 5.3
7	Sami Jauhojärvi (FIN)	+ 9.5
8	Jens Filbrich (GER)	+ 10.0
9	Marcus Hellner (SWE)	+ 10.5
10	Devon Kershaw (CAN)	+ 10.9

Women - 10 km classical
Place	Name	Time
1	Justyna Kowalczyk (POL)	28:10.0
2	Aino-Kaisa Saarinen (FIN)	+ 2.8
3	Kristin Størmer Steira (NOR)	+ 5.7
4	Virpi Kuitunen (FIN)	+13.2
5	Arianna Follis (ITA)	+26.6
6	Natalya Korostelyova (RUS)	+31.3
7	Marianna Longa (ITA)	+34.0
8	Vibeke Skofterud (NOR)	+34.8
9	Olga Zavyalova (RUS)	+35.2
10	Petra Majdič (SLO)	+35.7

=== Stage 3 ===
3 January 2010, Oberhof - sprint

Men - sprint classical
Place	Name	Time
1	Eldar Rønning (NOR)	3:55.0
2	Petter Northug (NOR)	+ 2.1
3	Axel Teichmann (GER)	+ 3.1
4	Teodor Peterson (SWE)	+ 9.7
5	Emil Jönsson (SWE)	+39.1
6	Ivan Alypov (RUS)	

Women - sprint classical
Place	Name	Time
1	Petra Majdič (SLO)	4:18.8
2	Justyna Kowalczyk (POL)	+ 2.1
3	Aino-Kaisa Saarinen (FIN)	+ 3.6
4	Arianna Follis (ITA)	+ 9.3
5	Kristin Størmer Steira (NOR)	+10.6
6	Alena Procházková (SVK)	

Defending champion Virpi Kuitunen (FIN) abandoned Tour de Ski after Stage 3 positioned in sixth place overall.

=== Stage 4 ===
4 January 2010, Prague, Czech Republic - sprint

Men - sprint freestyle
Place	Name	Time
1	Emil Jönsson (SWE)	2:26.5
2	Marcus Hellner (SWE)	+ 1.4
3	Simen Østensen (NOR)	+ 3.0
4	Dušan Kožíšek (CZE)	+ 3.6
5	Teodor Peterson (SWE)	+ 3.8
6	Andrew Newell (USA)	

Women - sprint freestyle
Place	Name	Time
1	Natalya Korostelyova (RUS)	2:45.7
2	Celine Brun-Lie (NOR)	+ 0.9
3	Alena Procházková (SVK)	+ 2.2
4	Arianna Follis (ITA)	+ 2.7
5	Aino-Kaisa Saarinen (FIN)	+ 9.9
6	Vesna Fabjan (SLO)	

Twenty male athletes left Tour de Ski after stage 4, including the tour leader Emil Jönsson (SWE), fourth placed Maxim Vylegzhanin (RUS) and seventh placed Eldar Rønning (NOR). The top three finishers in the women's sprint stage did not compete in the following stage.

=== Stage 5 ===
6 January 2010, Cortina d'Ampezzo – Toblach, Italy - handicap start

Men - 36 km freestyle (pursuit)
Place	Name	Time
1	Petter Northug (NOR)	1:25:38.0
2	Dario Cologna (SUI)	+ 0.4
3	Marcus Hellner (SWE)	+ 0.8
4	Jean-Marc Gaillard (FRA)	+ 10.8
5	Matti Heikkinen (FIN)	+ 12.0
6	Axel Teichmann (GER)	+ 22.3
7	Curdin Perl (SUI)	+ 36.1
8	Tord Asle Gjerdalen (NOR)	+ 36.7
9	Ivan Babikov (CAN)	+ 37.1
10	Tom Reichelt (GER)	+ 37.1

Women - 16 km freestyle (pursuit)
Place	Name	Time
1	Arianna Follis (ITA)	34:34.8
2	Petra Majdič (SLO)	+ 3.4
3	Justyna Kowalczyk (POL)	+ 4.1
4	Aino-Kaisa Saarinen (FIN)	+ 27.6
5	Marianna Longa (ITA)	+ 2:00.9
6	Riitta-Liisa Roponen (FIN)	+ 2:03.7
7	Olga Zavyalova (RUS)	+ 2:04.1
8	Kristin Størmer Steira (NOR)	+ 2:07.7
9	Vibeke Skofterud (NOR)	+ 2:43.4
10	Magda Genuin (ITA)	+ 3:07.1

=== Stage 6 ===
7 January 2010, Toblach - individual start

Men - 10 km classical
Place	Name	Time
1	Daniel Rickardsson (SWE)	23:14.5
2	Lukáš Bauer (CZE)	+1.7
3	Petter Northug (NOR)	+6.2
4	Axel Teichmann (GER)	+13.4
5	Marcus Hellner (SWE)	+25.5
6	Matti Heikkinen (FIN)	+28.6
7	Giorgio Di Centa (ITA)	+31.6
8	Dario Cologna (SUI)	+35.5
9	Alex Harvey (CAN)	+42.4
10	Jens Filbrich (GER)	+46.4

Women - 5 km classical
Place	Name	Time
1	Justyna Kowalczyk (POL)	12:37.6
2	Aino-Kaisa Saarinen (FIN)	+11.6
3	Petra Majdič (SLO)	+14.8
4	Kristin Størmer Steira (NOR)	+25.6
5	Vibeke Skofterud (NOR)	+27.1
6	Arianna Follis (ITA)	+27.3
7	Yuliya Chekalyova (RUS)	+29.6
8	Marthe Kristoffersen (NOR)	+35.4
9	Katrin Zeller (GER)	+36.9
10	Pirjo Muranen (FIN)	+39.1

=== Stage 7 ===
9 January 2010, Val di Fiemme - mass start

Men - 20 km classical (mass start)
Place	Name	Time
1	Lukáš Bauer (CZE)	59:03.5
2	Petter Northug (NOR)	+31.5
3	Axel Teichmann (GER)	+32.3
4	Dario Cologna (SUI)	+33.3
5	Daniel Rickardsson (SWE)	+37.1
6	Jean-Marc Gaillard (FRA)	+42.0
7	René Sommerfeldt (GER)	+44.6
8	Sergey Cherepanov (KAZ)	+45.4
9	Martin Johnsrud Sundby (NOR)	+46.5
10	Jens Filbrich (GER)	+48.0

Women - 10 km classical (mass start)
Place	Name	Time
1	Petra Majdič (SLO)	34:06.4
2	Elena Kolomina (KAZ)	+0.1
3	Marianna Longa (ITA)	+1.0
4	Riikka Sarasoja (FIN)	+1.3
5	Arianna Follis (ITA)	+2.4
6	Britta Johansson Norgren (SWE)	+2.5
7	Olga Zavyalova (RUS)	+4.4
8	Eva Nývltová (CZE)	+4.5
9	Magdalena Pajala (SWE)	+4.7
10	Katrin Zeller (GER)	+6.0

=== Stage 8 ===
10 January 2010, Val di Fiemme - distance

Men - 10 km freestyle Final Climb (pursuit)
Place	Name	Time
1	Lukáš Bauer (CZE)	33:43.4
2	Marcus Hellner (SWE)	+2.4
3	Jean-Marc Gaillard (FRA)	+2.5
4	Ivan Babikov (CAN)	+5.3
5	Dario Cologna (SUI)	+9.0
6	Vincent Vittoz (FRA)	+27.3
7	René Sommerfeldt (GER)	+32.0
8	Giorgio Di Centa (ITA)	+39.2
9	Jiří Magál (CZE)	+43.4
10	Roland Clara (ITA)	+45.5

Women - 9 km freestyle Final Climb (pursuit)
Place	Name	Time
1	Kristin Størmer Steira (NOR)	35:49.8
2	Riitta-Liisa Roponen (FIN)	+3.0
3	Yevgeniya Medvedeva (RUS)	+3.9
4	Justyna Kowalczyk (POL)	+25.0
5	Sabina Valbusa (ITA)	+30.3
6	Karine Laurent Philippot (FRA)	+42.8
7	Aino-Kaisa Saarinen (FIN)	+55.7
8	Olga Zavyalova (RUS)	+56.1
9	Svetlana Malahova-Shishkina (KAZ)	+1:11.6
10	Arianna Follis (ITA)	+1:12.1
