= Justyna Kowalczyk-Tekieli =

Polish cross-country skier (born 1983)

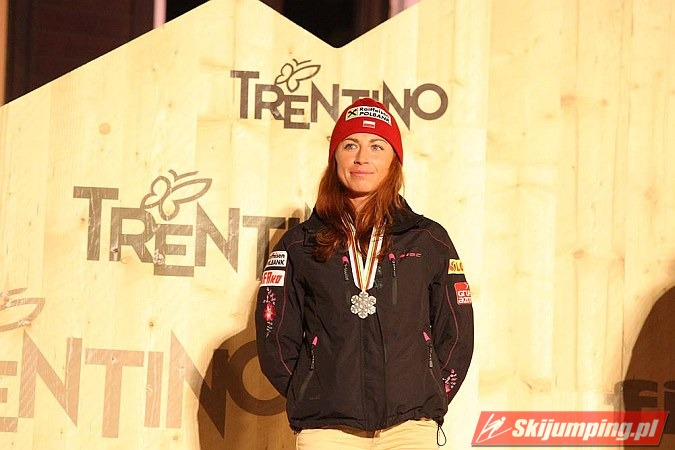

Personal information
- Nationality: Poland
- Born: 19 January 1983 (age 43) Limanowa, Poland
- Height: 1.73 m (5 ft 8 in)

Sport
- Sport: Skiing
- Club: AZS AWF Katowice

World Cup career
- Seasons: 17 – (2002–2018)
- Indiv. starts: 319
- Indiv. podiums: 104
- Indiv. wins: 50
- Team starts: 14
- Team podiums: 1
- Team wins: 0
- Overall titles: 4 – (2009, 2010, 2011, 2013)
- Discipline titles: 5 – (4 DI, 1 SP)
Medal record
Women's cross-country skiing
Representing Poland
Event	1st	2nd	3rd
Olympic Games	2	1	2
World Championships	2	3	3
Total	4	4	5
Olympic Games
Gold medal – first place	2010 Vancouver	30 km classical
Gold medal – first place	2014 Sochi	10 km classical
Silver medal – second place	2010 Vancouver	Individual sprint
Bronze medal – third place	2006 Turin	30 km freestyle
Bronze medal – third place	2010 Vancouver	15 km pursuit
World Championships
Gold medal – first place	2009 Liberec	15 km pursuit
Gold medal – first place	2009 Liberec	30 km freestyle
Silver medal – second place	2011 Oslo	10 km classical
Silver medal – second place	2011 Oslo	15 km pursuit
Silver medal – second place	2013 Val di Fiemme	30 km classical
Bronze medal – third place	2009 Liberec	10 km classical
Bronze medal – third place	2011 Oslo	30 km freestyle
Bronze medal – third place	2015 Falun	Team sprint
U23 World Championships
Gold medal – first place	2004 Park City	10 km skiathlon
Gold medal – first place	2004 Park City	15 km freestyle
Gold medal – first place	2006 Kranj	10 km classical
Gold medal – first place	2006 Kranj	15 km skiathlon
Bronze medal – third place	2004 Park City	Individual sprint
Junior World Championships
Silver medal – second place	2003 Sollefteå	Individual sprint
- Updated on 4 February 2017

Justyna Kowalczyk-Tekieli (Polish: [jusˈtɨna kɔˈvalt͡ʂɨk tɛˈkjɛli]; born 19 January 1983) is a Polish cross-country skier who has been competing since 2000. Kowalczyk is a double Olympic Champion and a double World Champion. She is also the only skier to win the Tour de Ski four times in a row and one of two female skiers (the other being Finn Marjo Matikainen) to win the FIS Cross-Country World Cup three times in a row. Kowalczyk holds the all-time record for wins in the Tour de Ski with 14, and had 29 podiums in total. She also won the Vasaloppet women's edition in 2015. She was voted the Polish Sports Personality of the Year a record five times.

She is a member of cross country ski department of AZS AWF Katowice and is coached by Aleksander Wierietielny.

== Career ==
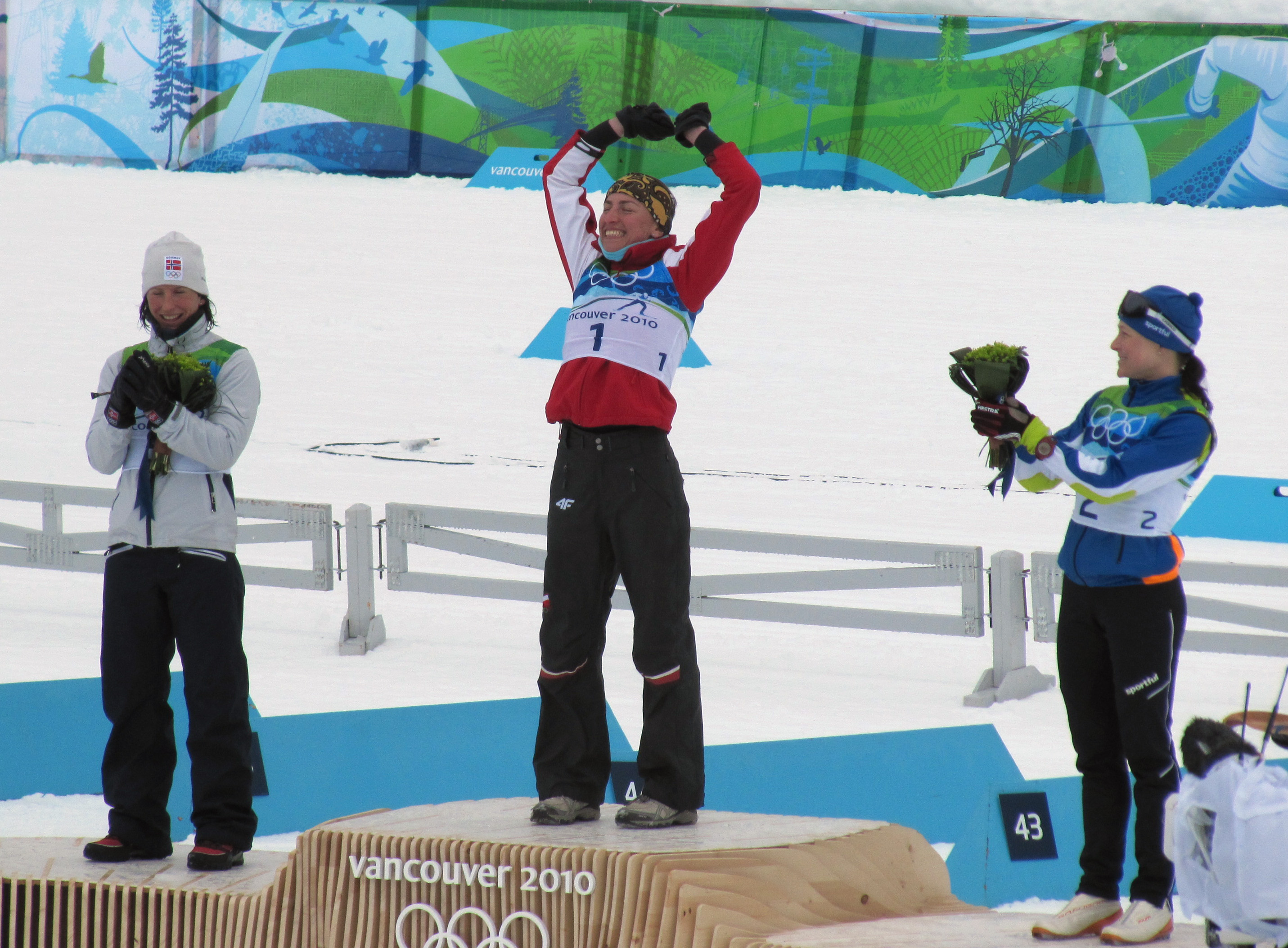
Justyna Kowalczyk celebrates the gold medal in the women's 30 km classical event at the 2010 Olympics.

Raised in the mountainous Goral village of Kasina Wielka, Southern Poland, Kowalczyk took up cross country skiing at the age of 10. She then competed in her first FIS World Cup race at Cogne (ITA) in December 2001.

In 2002 she came second in the individual sprint at the World Junior Championships. She finished 31st in the individual sprint at the 2003 FIS Nordic World Ski Championships. Kowalczyk's first World Cup Victory was the 10 km classic race at Otepää on 27 January 2007. Kowalczyk was 3rd overall in the 2007 World Cup.

She won the overall 2008–09 Cross-Country Skiing World Cup. On 24 March 2009, Kowalczyk was awarded the Knight's Cross of the Order of Polonia Restituta.

At the 2009 world championships in Liberec, Kowalczyk won two gold medals, one in the women's pursuit (7.5 km classical + 7.5 km free technique), and another one in the 30 km mass start. She also secured a bronze medal in the 10 km classical event.

On 27 February 2010, Kowalczyk beat Norway's Marit Bjørgen by 0.3 seconds to win the gold medal in the women's 30 km classical event in the 2010 Winter Olympics. She posted a time of one hour, 30 minutes, 33.7 seconds. She earned two more medals in Vancouver, taking silver behind Bjørgen in the individual sprint classic on 17 February 2010, and bronze in the 15 km pursuit on 19 February 2010.

Kowalczyk won the 10 km classical race in the 2014 Winter Olympics in Sochi on a broken foot. She did not finish 30 km freestyle race.

On 22 February 2015 won bronze medal of the World Championship 2015 in team sprint with Sylwia Jaśkowiec in Falun, Sweden.

She won the Vasaloppet ski marathon in 2015 with a time of 4:41:02. She also won the Birkebeinerrennet long-distance cross-country ski marathon held annually in Norway in 2017 and 2018.

=== Education ===
Kowalczyk graduated from the Jerzy Kukuczka University of Physical Education in Katowice with an M.A. and a Ph.D. degree in physical education in 2014 at the Bronisław Czech University of Physical Education in Kraków, where her dissertation was titled "The structure and volume of training load cross-country skiing on the background of the evolution of technology gear and different levels of sports".

== 2005 Suspension ==
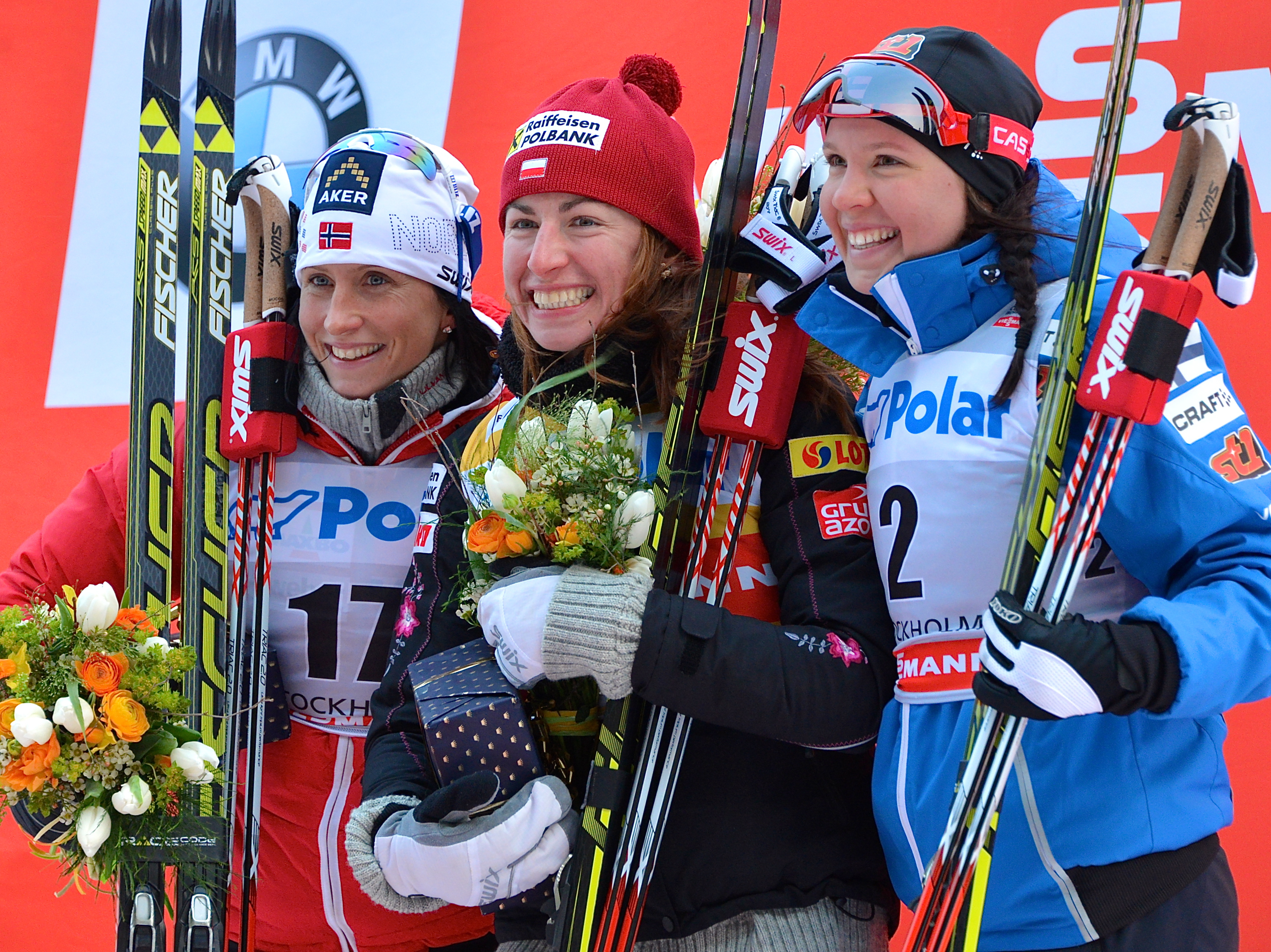
Justyna Kowalczyk (middle) in 2013 alongside Marit Bjørgen and Kerttu Niskanen.

At the 2005 World Championships, Kowalczyk competed but was subsequently disqualified for taking dexamethasone at the Under23 (U23) OPA (Alpine Nations) Intercontinental Cup competition in Oberstdorf, Germany back on 23 January 2005. Dexamethasone is a substance that is allowed Out-of-Competition but prohibited In-Competition. It acts as an anti-inflammatory and immunosuppressant. Kowalczyk used the substance to alleviate an Achilles tendon condition.

On 13 June 2005, the FIS Doping Panel issued a two-year suspension (23 January 2005 – 22 January 2007) for Kowalczyk. In late June 2005 FIS determined that since dexamethasone was a glucocorticosteroid, it was classified as a specified substance on the World Anti-Doping Agency (WADA) list of prohibited substances, and therefore the period of ineligibility for the first violation is at a maximum, one year's ineligibility. The FIS Doping Panel therefore reduced the suspension to one year.

Kowalczyk appealed to the Court of Arbitration for Sport (CAS) which held that Kowalczyk did not use Dexamethasone to enhance her sport performance. However, she acted negligently, but the measure of the negligence did not justify a one-year term of ineligibility. According to CAS, a reduced period of ineligibility ending 8 December 2005 (the day of the hearing) provided the fair and proportionate measure of sanction.

CAS criticised the FIS Doping Panel that their decision excluded any consideration of Kowalczyk's defence that she did not use the substance to enhance her sport performance. According to CAS, Kowalczyk had disclosed and substantiated her defence that Dexamethasone was not intended to enhance performance. She had submitted corresponding medical certifications to the FIS Doping Panel as proof of use in alleviating an Achilles tendon condition. Upon Kowalczyk's prima facie showing that her use of the substance was for medical reasons, the burden of proof shifted to FIS to prove the contrary.

== Criticism of anti-asthma drugs ==
Kowalczyk criticized Marit Bjørgen and other competitors during the Olympic Games in 2010 for using anti-asthma drugs. Bjørgen won five medals in the Olympics, three of them gold. The drug is allowed by FIS if prescribed by an Olympic team physician. Kowalczyk later apologized for the timing of her statements, since the Games were still going on at the time. The asthma medication Marit Bjørgen was using, Symbicort, has since been removed from WADA's list of banned substances.

== Personal life ==
She has three elder siblings: sisters Ilona and Wioletta and brother Tomasz. In 2014, she revealed in an interview with Gazeta Wyborcza that she had a miscarriage and later struggled with depression.

In 2020, she married Polish mountaineer Kacper Tekieli with whom she has a son Hugon (born 2021). In May 2023, her husband died in an avalanche in Swiss Alps while descending from the summit of Jungfrau.

== Cross-country skiing results ==
All results are sourced from the International Ski Federation (FIS).

=== Olympic Games ===
- 5 medals – (2 gold, 1 silver, 2 bronze)

Year	Age	10 km individual	15 km skiathlon	30 km mass start	Sprint	4 × 5 km relay	Team sprint
2006	23	DNF	8	3rd	44	—	—
2010	27	5	3rd	1st	2nd	DSQ	—
2014	31	1st	6	DNF	—	7	5
2018	35	—	17	14	22	10	7

=== World Championships ===
- 8 medals – (2 gold, 3 silver, 3 bronze)

Year	Age	10 km	Pursuit	30 km	Sprint	4 × 5 km relay	Team sprint
2003	20	48	—	—	31	—	—
2005	22	9	13	4	12	—	—
2007	24	18	9	DNF	17	—	—
2009	26	3rd	1st	1st	—	6	—
2011	28	2nd	2nd	3rd	5	8	—
2013	30	—	5	2nd	6	9	—
2015	32	—	—	17	4	5	3rd
2017	34	8	—	—	—	8	9
2019	36	—	—	—	—	13	10

=== World Cup ===
- 9 titles – (4 overall, 4 distance, 1 sprint)

Season Titles
Season	Discipline
2008–09	Overall
2008–09	Distance
2009–10	Overall
2009–10	Distance
2009–10	Sprint
2010–11	Overall
2010–11	Distance
2012–13	Overall
2012–13	Distance

Season Standings
Season	Age	Discipline standings			Ski Tour standings			
Season	Age	Overall	Distance	Sprint	Nordic Opening	Tour de Ski	World Cup Final	Ski Tour Canada
2002	19	103	—	73	—N/a	—N/a	—N/a	—N/a
2003	20	88	NC	61	—N/a	—N/a	—N/a	—N/a
2004	21	46	42	38	—N/a	—N/a	—N/a	—N/a
2005	22	44	30	44	—N/a	—N/a	—N/a	—N/a
2006	23	13	17	17	—N/a	—N/a	—N/a	—N/a
2007	24	8	10	17	—N/a	11	—N/a	—N/a
2008	25	3rd	3rd	8	—N/a	7	—N/a	—N/a
2009	26	1st	1st	4	—N/a	4	1st	—N/a
2010	27	1st	1st	1st	—N/a	1st	2nd	—N/a
2011	28	1st	1st	5	2nd	1st	2nd	—N/a
2012	29	2nd	2nd	4	5	1st	5	—N/a
2013	30	1st	1st	2nd	2nd	1st	DNF	—N/a
2014	31	12	7	13	4	—	—	—N/a
2015	32	13	13	33	10	DNF	—N/a	—N/a
2016	33	16	13	35	11	23	—N/a	9
2017	34	21	14	27	19	—	—	—N/a
2018	35	54	49	41	24	—	—	—N/a

==== Individual podiums ====
- 50 victories – (31 WC, 19 SWC)
- 104 podiums – (64 WC, 40 SWC)

No.	Season	Date	Location	Race	Level	Place
1	2005–06	7 January 2006	Otepää, Estonia	10 km Individual C	World Cup	3rd
2	2006–07	27 January 2007	Otepää, Estonia	10 km Individual C	World Cup	1st
3	2007–08	2 December 2007	Rukatunturi, Finland	10 km Individual C	World Cup	3rd
4	2007–08	28 December 2007	Nové Město, Czech Republic	3.3 km Individual C	Stage World Cup	3rd
5	2007–08	4 January 2008	Asiago, Italy	1.2 km Sprint F	Stage World Cup	3rd
6	2007–08	22 January 2008	Canmore, Canada	7.5 km + 7.5 km Pursuit C/F	World Cup	1st
7	2007–08	22 January 2008	Canmore, Canada	1.2 km Sprint C	World Cup	3rd
8	2007–08	23 January 2008	Canmore, Canada	10 km Individual F	World Cup	3rd
9	2007–08	16 February 2008	Liberec, Czech Republic	7.6 km Individual F	World Cup	2nd
10	2007–08	16 March 2008	Bormio, Italy	10 km Pursuit F	World Cup	2nd
11	2008–09	29 November 2008	Rukatunturi, Finland	1.2 km Sprint C	World Cup	3rd
12	2008–09	27 December 2008	Oberhof, Germany	2.8 km Individual F	Stage World Cup	3rd
13	2008–09	28 December 2008	Oberhof, Germany	10 km Pursuit C	Stage World Cup	3rd
14	2008–09	16 January 2009	Whistler, Canada	1.2 km Sprint C	World Cup	2nd
15	2008–09	17 January 2009	Whistler, Canada	7.5 km + 7.5 km Pursuit C/F	World Cup	1st
16	2008–09	24 January 2009	Otepää, Estonia	10 km Individual C	World Cup	1st
17	2008–09	14 February 2009	Valdidentro, Italy	10 km Individual C	World Cup	1st
18	2008–09	8 March 2009	Lahti, Finland	10 km Individual F	World Cup	1st
18	2008–09	12 March 2009	Trondheim, Norway	1.4 km Sprint C	World Cup	3rd
20	2008–09	14 March 2009	Trondheim, Norway	30 km Mass Start C	World Cup	2nd
21	2008–09	20 March 2009	Falun, Sweden	2.5 km Individual F	Stage World Cup	3rd
22	2008–09	21 March 2009	Falun, Sweden	5 km + 5 km Pursuit C/F	Stage World Cup	3rd
23	2008–09	18–22 March 2009	(Sweden) World Cup Final	Overall Standings	World Cup	1st
24	2009–10	28 November 2009	Rukatunturi, Finland	1.2 km Sprint C	World Cup	1st
25	2009–10	19 December 2009	Rogla, Slovenia	1.0 km Sprint C	World Cup	2nd
26	2009–10	20 December 2009	Rogla, Slovenia	15 km Mass Start C	World Cup	1st
27	2009–10	1 January 2010	Oberhof, Germany	2.8 km Individual F	Stage World Cup	3rd
28	2009–10	2 January 2010	Oberhof, Germany	10 km Pursuit C	Stage World Cup	1st
29	2009–10	3 January 2010	Oberhof, Germany	1.6 km Sprint C	Stage World Cup	2nd
30	2009–10	6 January 2010	Cortina–Toblach, Italy	16 km Pursuit F	Stage World Cup	2nd
31	2009–10	7 January 2010	Cortina–Toblach, Italy	5 km Individual C	Stage World Cup	1st
32	2009–10	1–10 January 2010	(Germany) (Czech Republic) (Italy) Tour de Ski	Overall Standings	World Cup	1st
33	2009–10	16 January 2010	Otepää, Estonia	10 km Individual C	World Cup	1st
34	2009–10	22 January 2010	Rybinsk, Russia	1.0 km Sprint F	World Cup	3rd
35	2009–10	23 January 2010	Rybinsk, Russia	7.5 km + 7.5 km Pursuit C/F	World Cup	1st
36	2009–10	5 February 2010	Canmore, Canada	10 km Individual F	World Cup	2nd
37	2009–10	6 February 2010	Canmore, Canada	1.45 km Sprint C	World Cup	1st
38	2009–10	6 March 2010	Lahti, Finland	7.5 km + 7.5 km Pursuit C/F	World Cup	2nd
39	2009–10	17 March 2010	Stockholm, Sweden	1.1 km Sprint C	Stage World Cup	2nd
40	2009–10	19 March 2010	Falun, Sweden	2.5 km Individual C	Stage World Cup	1st
41	2009–10	17–21 March 2010	(Sweden) World Cup Final	Overall Standings	World Cup	2nd
42	2010–11	27 November 2010	Rukatunturi, Finland	5 km Individual C	Stage World Cup	2nd
43	2010–11	28 November 2010	Rukatunturi, Finland	10 km Pursuit F	Stage World Cup	3rd
44	2010–11	26–28 November 2010	(Finland) Nordic Opening	Overall Standings	World Cup	2nd
45	2010–11	11 December 2010	Davos, Switzerland	10 km Individual C	World Cup	2nd
46	2010–11	18 December 2010	La Clusaz, France	15 km Mass Start F	World Cup	2nd
47	2010–11	31 December 2010	Oberhof, Germany	2.5 km Individual F	Stage World Cup	1st
48	2010–11	1 January 2011	Oberhof, Germany	10 km Pursuit C	Stage World Cup	1st
49	2010–11	2 January 2011	Oberstdorf, Germany	1.2 km Sprint C	Stage World Cup	2nd
50	2010–11	6 January 2011	Cortina–Toblach, Italy	16 km Pursuit F	Stage World Cup	1st
51	2010–11	6 January 2011	Val di Fiemme, Italy	10 km Mass Start	Stage World Cup	1st
52	2010–11	31 December 2010 – 9 January 2011	(Germany) (Italy) Tour de Ski	Overall Standings	World Cup	1st
53	2010–11	22 January 2011	Otepää, Estonia	10 km Individual C	World Cup	2nd
54	2010–11	4 February 2011	Rybinsk, Russia	5 km + 5 km Pursuit C/F	World Cup	1st
55	2010–11	5 February 2011	Rybinsk, Russia	1.3 km Sprint F	World Cup	3rd
56	2010–11	19 February 2011	Drammen, Norway	10 km Individual C	World Cup	2nd
57	2010–11	12 March 2011	Lahti, Finland	5 km + 5 km Pursuit C/F	World Cup	2nd
58	2010–11	18 March 2011	Falun, Sweden	2.5 km Individual C	Stage World Cup	2nd
59	2010–11	19 March 2011	Falun, Sweden	5 km + 5 km Pursuit C/F	Stage World Cup	2nd
60	2010–11	16–20 March 2011	(Sweden) World Cup Final	Overall Standings	World Cup	2nd
61	2011–12	17 December 2011	Rogla, Slovenia	10 km Mass Start C	World Cup	1st
62	2011–12	29 December 2011	Oberhof, Germany	2.5 km Individual F	Stage World Cup	1st
63	2011–12	30 December 2011	Oberhof, Germany	10 km Pursuit C	Stage World Cup	1st
64	2011–12	31 December 2011	Oberstdorf, Germany	1.2 km Sprint C	Stage World Cup	1st
65	2011–12	1 January 2012	Oberstdorf, Germany	5 km + 5 km Skiathlon C/F	Stage World Cup	2nd
66	2011–12	3 January 2012	Toblach, Italy	3 km Individual C	Stage World Cup	2nd
67	2011–12	4 January 2012	Toblach, Italy	1.3 km Sprint F	Stage World Cup	3rd
68	2011–12	5 January 2012	Toblach, Italy	15 km Pursuit F	Stage World Cup	2nd
69	2011–12	7 January 2012	Val di Fiemme, Italy	10 km Mass Start C	Stage World Cup	1st
70	2011–12	8 January 2012	Val di Fiemme, Italy	9 km Pursuit F	Stage World Cup	2nd
71	2011–12	29 December 2011 – 8 January 2012	(Germany) (Italy) Tour de Ski	Overall Standings	World Cup	1st
72	2011–12	21 January 2012	Otepää, Estonia	1.2 km Sprint C	World Cup	1st
73	2011–12	22 January 2012	Otepää, Estonia	10 km Individual C	World Cup	1st
74	2011–12	2 February 2012	Moscow, Russia	1.5 km Sprint F	World Cup	1st
75	2011–12	5 February 2012	Rybinsk, Russia	7.5 km + 7.5 km Skiathlon C/F	World Cup	2nd
76	2011–12	11 February 2012	Nové Město, Czech Republic	15 km Mass Start C	World Cup	2nd
77	2011–12	18 February 2012	Szklarska Poręba, Poland	10 km Individual C	World Cup	1st
78	2011–12	4 March 2012	Lahti, Finland	1.4 km Sprint C	World Cup	3rd
79	2011–12	7 March 2012	Drammen, Norway	1.2 km Sprint C	World Cup	3rd
80	2011–12	11 March 2012	Oslo, Norway	30 km Mass Start	World Cup	2nd
81	2011–12	17 March 2012	Falun, Sweden	10 km Mass Start C	Stage World Cup	1st
82	2012–13	30 November – 2 December 2012	(Finland) Nordic Opening	Overall Standings	World Cup	2nd
83	2012–13	13 December 2012	Canmore, Canada	10 km Mass Start C	World Cup	1st
84	2012–13	16 December 2012	Canmore, Canada	7.5 km + 7.5 km Skiathlon C/F	World Cup	1st
85	2012–13	29 December 2012	Oberhof, Germany	3 km Individual F	Stage World Cup	3rd
86	2012–13	30 December 2012	Oberhof, Germany	9 km Pursuit C	Stage World Cup	1st
87	2012–13	3 January 2013	Cortina–Toblach, Italy	15 km Pursuit F	Stage World Cup	1st
88	2012–13	4 January 2013	Toblach, Italy	3 km Individual C	Stage World Cup	1st
89	2012–13	4 January 2013	Val di Fiemme, Italy	10 km Mass Start C	Stage World Cup	1st
90	2012–13	29 December 2012 – 6 January 2013	(Germany) (Switzerland) (Italy) Tour de Ski	Overall Standings	World Cup	1st
91	2012–13	12 January 2013	Liberec, Czech Republic	0.85 km Sprint C	World Cup	2nd
92	2012–13	19 January 2013	La Clusaz, France	10 km Mass Start C	World Cup	3rd
93	2012–13	16 February 2013	Davos, Switzerland	1.5 km Sprint C	World Cup	1st
94	2012–13	17 February 2013	Davos, Switzerland	10 km Individual F	World Cup	2nd
95	2012–13	10 March 2013	Lahti, Finland	10 km Individual C	World Cup	1st
96	2012–13	13 March 2013	Drammen, Norway	1.3 km Sprint C	World Cup	1st
97	2012–13	17 March 2013	Oslo, Norway	30 km Mass Start F	World Cup	2nd
98	2012–13	20 March 2013	Stockholm, Sweden	1.1 km Sprint C	Stage World Cup	1st
99	2013–14	29 November 2013	Rukatunturi, Finland	1.4 km Sprint C	Stage World Cup	1st
100	2013–14	30 November 2013	Rukatunturi, Finland	5 km Individual C	Stage World Cup	1st
101	2013–14	7 December 2013	Lillehammer, Norway	10 km Individual C	World Cup	1st
102	2013–14	21 December 2013	Asiago, Italy	1.25 km Sprint C	World Cup	1st
103	2013–14	19 January 2014	Szklarska Poręba, Poland	10 km Mass Start C	World Cup	1st
104	2016–17	4 February 2017	Pyeongchang, South Korea	7.5 km + 7.5 km Skiathlon C/F	World Cup	1st

==== Team podiums ====
- 1 podium – (1 TS)

No.	Season	Date	Location	Race	Level	Place	Teammate
1	2014–15	18 January 2015	Otepää, Estonia	6 × 1.2 km Team Sprint F	World Cup	3rd	Jaśkowiec

== See also ==
- Sport in Poland
- Tour de Ski
- List of Polish people
