= Terry Fox Award =

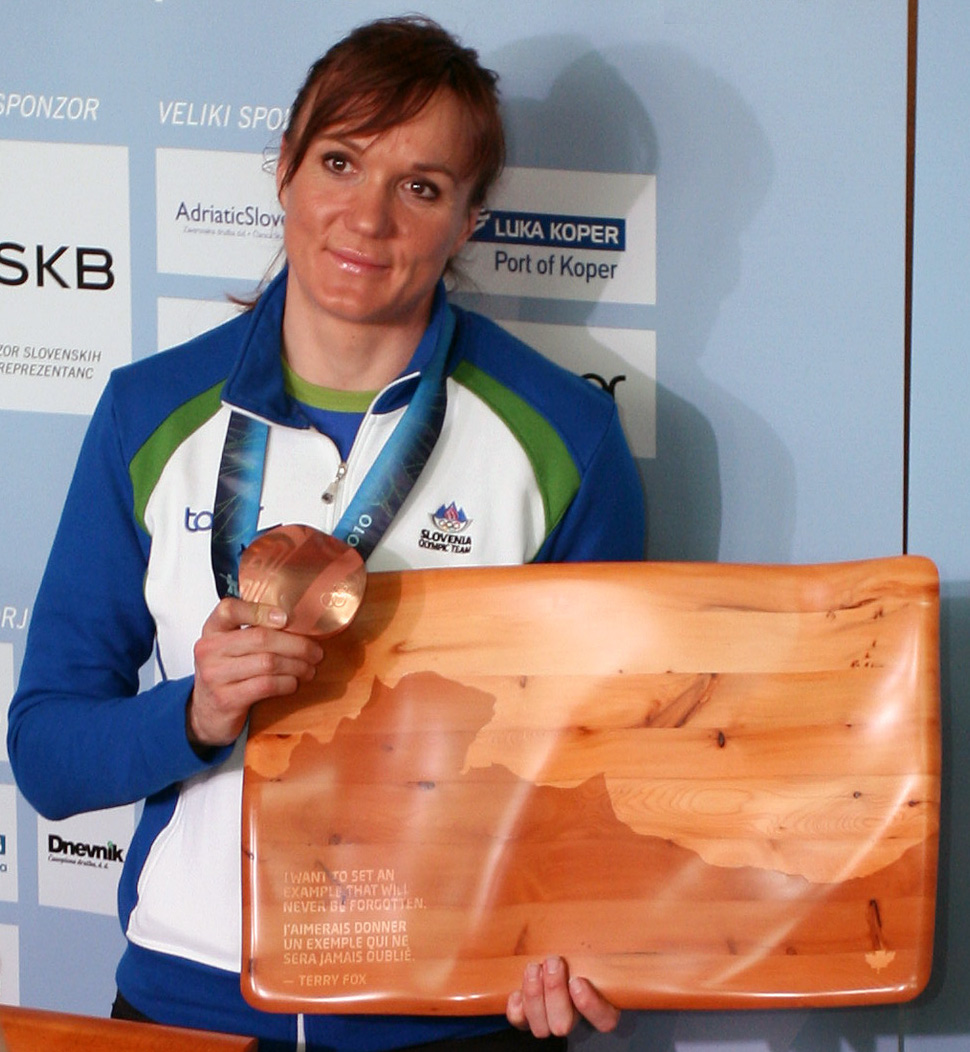
- Petra Majdić with the Terry Fox Award
- Date: February 27, 2010
- Country: Canada
- First award: 2010
- Final award: 2010
- Currently held by: Joannie Rochette, and Petra Majdič

The Vancouver 2010 Terry Fox Award was awarded to Olympic athletes who embodied Terry Fox's values of determination and humility in the face of adversity. It was created for the 2010 Winter Olympics in Vancouver, British Columbia, Canada. The Vancouver Olympic Committee collaborated with Fox's parents, Betty and Rolly, to create the award.

Fox's parents presented the awards to Joannie Rochette and Petra Majdič on February 27, 2010. The award is a nickel and wooden tray depicting the path of Fox's 1980 Marathon of Hope run across Canada to raise funds for cancer research. The words: "I want to set an example that will never be forgotten. —Terry Fox" are written on the tray in English and French.

Rochette is a Canadian figure skater whose mother, Therese, died suddenly on February 21, 2010, of a massive heart attack, just hours after she and Rochette's father, Normand, arrived in Vancouver and two days before the women's short program. Despite emotional turmoil, she went on to win bronze in Ladies' Figure Skating.

Majdič is a Slovenian cross-country skier who continued competing despite suffering four broken ribs and a collapsed lung as a result of a crash during training before the individual classical sprint on February 17, 2010. She fell on a sharp curve and tumbled off the course, then slid on her back down a three-metre slope and onto some rocks. Despite obvious physical pain, she went on to win bronze in the Ladies' Individual Sprint Classic. She needed help stepping onto the podium due to her injuries.

The selection committee, that included Fox's brother, Darrell, sportscaster Brian Williams, former-Olympian and VANOC board member Charmaine Crooks and former rower Tricia Smith, originally planned to choose only one recipient but felt both athletes' stories were so compelling that they decided to honour both.
