= Arianna Follis =

Italian cross-country skier

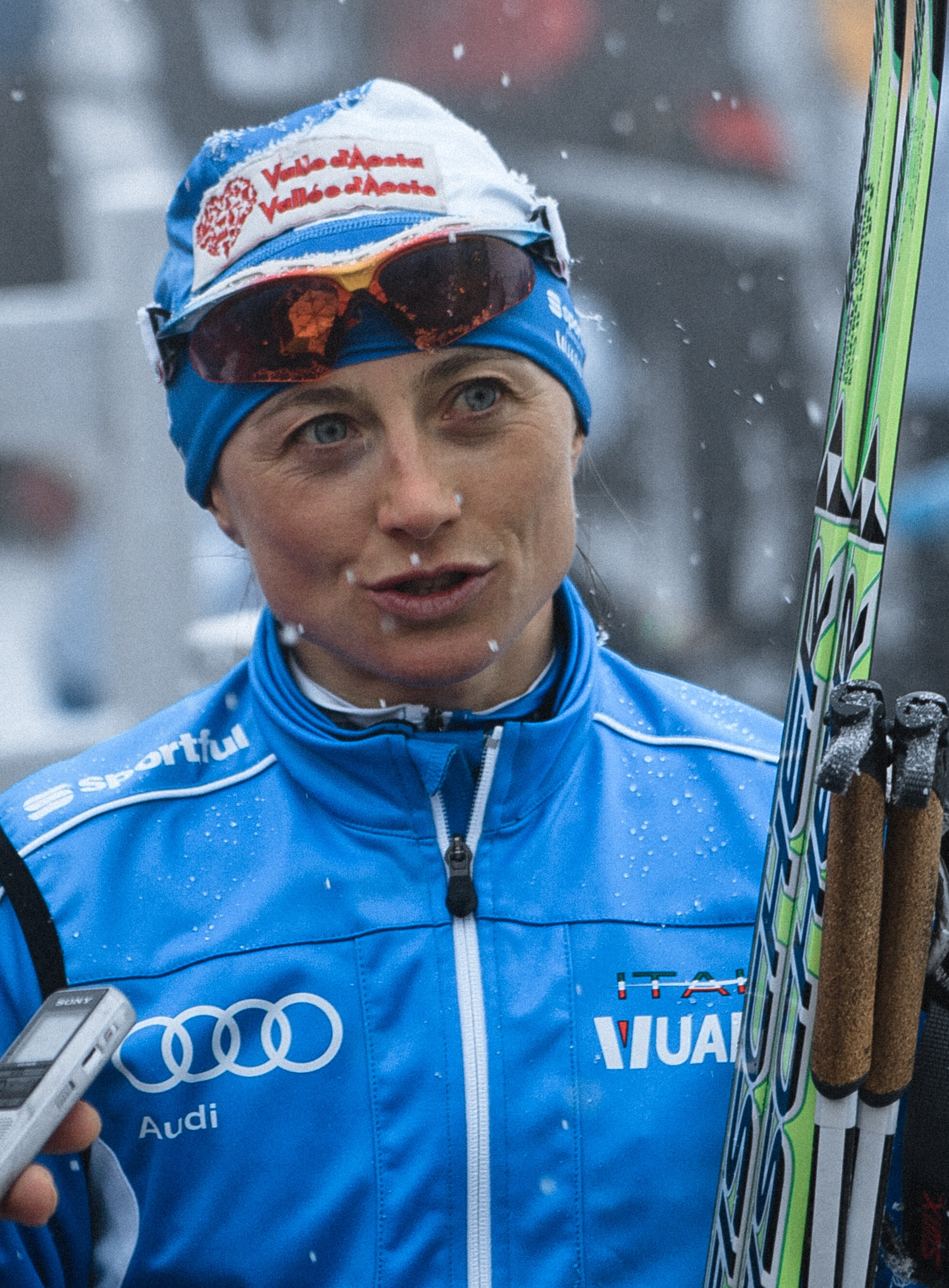

Personal information
- Full name: Arianna Fernanda Follis
- Nationality: Italy
- Born: 11 November 1977 (age 48) Ivrea, Piedmont, Italy
- Height: 162 cm (5 ft 4 in)

Sport
- Sport: Skiing
- Club: G.S. Forestale

World Cup career
- Seasons: 15 – (1996, 1998–2011)
- Indiv. starts: 199
- Indiv. podiums: 23
- Indiv. wins: 8
- Team starts: 43
- Team podiums: 13
- Team wins: 4
- Overall titles: 0 – (3rd in 2011)
- Discipline titles: 0
Medal record
Women's cross-country skiing
Representing Italy
Olympic Games
Bronze medal – third place	2006 Turin	4 × 5 km relay
World Championships
Gold medal – first place	2009 Liberec	Individual sprint
Silver medal – second place	2011 Oslo	Individual sprint
Bronze medal – third place	2005 Oberstdorf	4 × 5 km relay
Bronze medal – third place	2007 Sapporo	10 km freestyle
Bronze medal – third place	2009 Liberec	Team sprint
Junior World Championships
Gold medal – first place	1997 Canmore	4 × 5 km relay

Arianna Fernanda Follis (born 11 November 1977, in Ivrea) is an Italian cross-country skier.

== Biography ==
Born in Ivrea, Piedmont, but originally from Gressoney-Saint-Jean, Aosta Valley, where she was raised, Follis started competing in 1995. Competing in two Winter Olympics, she earned a bronze medal in the 4 × 5 km relay at Turin in 2006.

Follis earned five medals at the FIS Nordic World Ski Championships with a gold (Individual sprint: 2009), one silver (Individual sprint: 2011) and three bronzes (10 km: 2007, Team sprint: 2009, 4 × 5 km relay: 2005). She has six individual victories at various levels up to 10 km since 1998.

She retired from cross-country skiing after the 2010–2011 season.

== Cross-country skiing results ==
All results are sourced from the International Ski Federation (FIS).

=== Olympic Games ===
- 1 medal – (1 bronze)

Year	Age	10 km individual	15 km skiathlon	30 km mass start	Sprint	4 × 5 km relay	Team sprint
2006	28	—	36	12	7	Bronze	7
2010	32	11	9	—	—	4	4

=== World Championships ===
- 5 medals – (1 gold, 1 silver, 3 bronze)

Year	Age	10 km	15 km	Pursuit	30 km	Sprint	4 × 5 km relay	Team sprint
2001	23	—	—	28	CNX^{[a]}	13	—	—N/a
2003	25	—	—	21	30	—	7	—N/a
2005	27	18	—N/a	—	—	—	Bronze	5
2007	29	Bronze	—N/a	19	—	—	6	8
2009	31	—	—N/a	7	8	Gold	5	Bronze
2011	33	—	—N/a	19	DNS	Silver	4	4

a. ^{1} Cancelled due to extremely cold weather.

=== World Cup ===
==== Season standings ====
Season	Age	Discipline standings					Ski Tour standings		
Season	Age	Overall	Distance	Long Distance	Middle Distance	Sprint	Nordic Opening	Tour de Ski	World Cup Final
1996	18	NC	—N/a	—N/a	—N/a	—N/a	—N/a	—N/a	—N/a
1998	20	NC	—N/a	NC	—N/a	—	—N/a	—N/a	—N/a
1999	21	NC	—N/a	NC	—N/a	—	—N/a	—N/a	—N/a
2000	22	77	—N/a	45	NC	—	—N/a	—N/a	—N/a
2001	23	49	—N/a	—N/a	—N/a	37	—N/a	—N/a	—N/a
2002	24	85	—N/a	—N/a	—N/a	73	—N/a	—N/a	—N/a
2003	25	57	—N/a	—N/a	—N/a	40	—N/a	—N/a	—N/a
2004	26	36	48	—N/a	—N/a	20	—N/a	—N/a	—N/a
2005	27	48	51	—N/a	—N/a	25	—N/a	—N/a	—N/a
2006	28	16	30	—N/a	—N/a	7	—N/a	—N/a	—N/a
2007	29	10	17	—N/a	—N/a	8	—N/a	16	—N/a
2008	30	7	9	—N/a	—N/a	9	—N/a	3rd place, bronze medalist(s)	9
2009	31	4	8	—N/a	—N/a	2nd place, silver medalist(s)	—N/a	8	11
2010	32	5	7	—N/a	—N/a	10	—N/a	3rd place, bronze medalist(s)	12
2011	33	3rd place, bronze medalist(s)	5	—N/a	—N/a	2nd place, silver medalist(s)	9	4	4

==== Individual podiums ====
- 8 victories – (3 WC, 5 SWC)
- 23 podiums – (13 WC, 10 SWC)

No.	Season	Date	Location	Race	Level	Place
1	2005–06	7 March 2006	Borlänge, Sweden	0.75 km Sprint F	World Cup	1st
2	2006–07	16 December 2006	La Clusaz, France	15 km Mass Start F	World Cup	3rd
3	2006–07	31 December 2006	Munich, Germany	1.1 km Sprint F	Stage World Cup	2nd
4	2006–07	5 January 2007	Asiago, Italy	1.2 km Sprint F	Stage World Cup	3rd
5	2006–07	21 January 2007	Rybinsk, Russia	1.2 km Sprint F	World Cup	1st
6	2007–08	30 December 2007	Prague, Czech Republic	1.0 km Sprint F	Stage World Cup	1st
7	2007–08	28 December 2007 – 6 January 2008	(Czech Republic) (Italy) Tour de Ski	Overall Standings	World Cup	3rd
8	2008–09	27 December 2008	Oberhof, Germany	2.8 km Individual F	Stage World Cup	2nd
9	2008–09	29 December 2008	Prague, Czech Republic	1.3 km Sprint F	Stage World Cup	1st
10	2008–09	1 January 2009	Nové Město, Czech Republic	1.2 km Sprint F	Stage World Cup	1st
11	2008–09	17 January 2009	Whistler, Canada	7.5 km + 7.5 km Pursuit C/F	World Cup	3rd
12	2008–09	30 January 2009	Rybinsk, Russia	10 km Mass Start F	World Cup	2nd
13	2008–09	31 January 2009	Rybinsk, Russia	1.3 km Sprint F	World Cup	2nd
14	2008–09	7 March 2009	Lahti, Finland	1.2 km Sprint F	World Cup	2nd
15	2009–10	6 January 2010	Toblach, Italy	15 km Pursuit F	Stage World Cup	1st
16	2009–10	1–10 January 2010	(Germany) (Czech Republic) (Italy) Tour de Ski	Overall Standings	World Cup	3rd
17	2010–11	20 November 2010	Gällivare, Sweden	10 km Individual F	World Cup	3rd
18	2010–11	4 December 2010	Düsseldorf, Germany	0.9 km Sprint F	World Cup	1st
19	2010–11	12 December 2010	Davos, Switzerland	1.4 km Sprint F	World Cup	2nd
20	2010–11	5 January 2011	Toblach, Italy	1.3 km Sprint F	Stage World Cup	2nd
21	2010–11	6 January 2011	Toblach, Italy	15 km Pursuit F	Stage World Cup	2nd
22	2010–11	12 March 2011	Lahti, Finland	5 km + 5 km Pursuit C/F	World Cup	3rd
23	2010–11	20 March 2011	Falun, Sweden	10 km Pursuit F	Stage World Cup	1st

==== Team podiums ====
- 4 victories – (1 RL, 3 TS)
- 13 podiums – (7 RL, 6 TS)

No.	Season	Date	Location	Race	Level	Place	Teammate(s)
1	2001–02	16 December 2001	Davos, Switzerland	4 × 5 km Relay C/F	World Cup	3rd	Paluselli / Paruzzi / Belmondo
2	2002–03	24 November 2002	Kiruna, Sweden	4 × 5 km Relay C/F	World Cup	3rd	Genuin / Paruzzi / Valbusa
3	2002–03	14 February 2003	Asiago, Italy	6 × 1.4 km Team Sprint F	World Cup	3rd	Moroder
4	2002–03	23 March 2003	Falun, Sweden	4 × 5 km Relay C/F	World Cup	3rd	Valbusa / Paruzzi / Confortola
5	2004–05	24 November 2004	Düsseldorf, Germany	6 × 0.8 km Team Sprint F	World Cup	3rd	Paruzzi
6	2004–05	5 December 2004	Bern, Switzerland	6 × 1.1 km Team Sprint F	World Cup	3rd	Paruzzi
7	2008–09	18 January 2009	Whistler, Canada	6 × 1.3 km Team Sprint F	World Cup	1st	Genuin
8	2009–10	6 December 2009	Düsseldorf, Germany	6 × 0.8 km Team Sprint F	World Cup	1st	Genuin
9	2009–10	7 March 2010	Lahti, Finland	4 × 5 km Relay C/F	World Cup	3rd	Longa / Confortola / Valbusa
10	2010–11	21 November 2010	Gällivare, Sweden	4 × 5 km Relay C/F	World Cup	3rd	Genuin / Longa / Rupil
11	2010–11	5 December 2010	Düsseldorf, Germany	6 × 0.9 km Team Sprint F	World Cup	1st	Genuin
12	2010–11	19 December 2010	La Clusaz, France	4 × 5 km Relay C/F	World Cup	2nd	De Martin Topranin / Longa / Rupil
13	2010–11	6 February 2011	Rybinsk, Russia	4 × 5 km Relay C/F	World Cup	1st	Genuin / Longa / Rupil

=== Italian Championships ===
- 2001: 2nd, Italian women's championships of cross-country skiing, sprint
- 2003: 3rd, Italian women's championships of cross-country skiing, 10 km pursuit
- 2004: 2nd, Italian women's championships of cross-country skiing, sprint
- 2005: 3rd, Italian women's championships of cross-country skiing, 2 × 7.5 km pursuit
- 2006: 3rd, Italian women's championships of cross-country skiing, sprint
- 2007: 3rd, Italian women's championships of cross-country skiing, 2 × 7.5 km pursuit
- 2008: 1st, Italian women's championships of cross-country skiing, 30 km
- 2009: 1st, Italian women's championships of cross-country skiing, 30 km
- 2010:
  - 1st, Italian women's championships of cross-country skiing, 30 km
  - 1st, Italian women's championships of cross-country skiing, 2 × 7.5 km pursuit
- 2011: 2nd, Italian women's championships of cross-country skiing, 10 km

== Ski mountaineering results ==
- 2000: 1st, Tour du Rutor (together with Gloriana Pellissier)
- 2001: 1st, Trofeo Mezzalama (together with Gloriana Pellissier and Alexia Zuberer)
- 2003: 1st, Trofeo Mezzalama (together with Cristina Favre-Moretti and Chiara Raso)
