= Cross-country skiing at the 2010 Winter Olympics – Women's 15 kilometre pursuit =

Women's 15 kilometre pursuit at the XXI Olympic Winter Games
- Pictogram for cross country
- Venue: Whistler Olympic Park
- Dates: 19 February 2010
- Competitors: 68 from 25 nations
- Winning time: 39:58.1

Medalists
1st place, gold medalist(s)		Marit Bjørgen	Norway
2nd place, silver medalist(s)		Anna Haag	Sweden
3rd place, bronze medalist(s)		Justyna Kowalczyk	Poland

The women's 7.5 kilometre + 7.5 kilometre double pursuit cross-country skiing competition at the 2010 Winter Olympics in Vancouver, Canada was held on 19 February at Whistler Olympic Park in Whistler, British Columbia at 13:00 PST.

The 15 km double pursuit format has been competed at the world championship level since 2005 and at the Winter Olympic level since 2006. Estonia's Kristina Šmigun-Vähi was the defending Olympic champion. Poland's Justyna Kowalczyk was the defending world champion. Kowalczyk also won the test event that took place at the Olympic venue on 17 January 2009. The last World Cup event prior to the 2010 Games in this format took place on 23 January 2010 in Rybinsk, Russia and was won by Kowalczyk.

The pursuit consisted of a 7.5 kilometre section raced in the classical style, followed by a 7.5 kilometre portion raced freestyle. In between the sections, each skier takes time (approximately 30 seconds) to change skis and poles in a pit stop.

== Results ==
Leaders after the classical portion were Finland's Saarinen (who finished fifth), Bjørgen, and Kowalczyk. Pit stop leaders were tied for first with Saarinen and Italy's Follis (who finished ninth), and Finland's Roponen (who finished 15th). Kowalczyk edged out Størmer Steira in a photo finish in the bronze. For Størmer Steira, it became the fourth fourth-place finish in the Olympics (following three fourth places in 2006), and she again failed to win a medal. (She became on Olympic champion in the relay several days later). Defending Olympic champion Smigun-Vähi dropped out during the classical portion of the event.

Rank	Bib	Name	Country	7.5 km C	Rank	Pitstop	7.5 km F	Rank	Finish Time	Deficit
1st place, gold medalist(s)	6	Marit Bjørgen	Norway	21:00.8	2	25.8	18:31.5	1	39:58.1	
2nd place, silver medalist(s)	11	Anna Haag	Sweden	21:04.5	4	24.7	18:37.8	2	40:07.0	+8.9
3rd place, bronze medalist(s)	1	Justyna Kowalczyk	Poland	21:02.2	3	23.2	18:42.0	4	40:07.4	+9.3
4	4	Kristin Størmer Steira	Norway	21:05.1	5	22.7	18:39.7	3	40:07.5	+9.4
5	2	Aino-Kaisa Saarinen	Finland	21:00.7	1	21.9	19:18.0	7	40:40.6	+42.5
6	23	Therese Johaug	Norway	21:06.1	7	26.9	19:17.0	5	40:50.0	+51.9
7	9	Marianna Longa	Italy	21:05.5	6	23.1	19:33.6	14	41:02.2	+1:04.1
8	3	Charlotte Kalla	Sweden	21:26.4	9	24.6	19:27.5	11	41:18.5	+1:20.4
9	7	Arianna Follis	Italy	21:26.0	8	21.9	19:33.7	15	41:21.6	+1:23.5
10	28	Sara Renner	Canada	21:28.1	10	25.5	19:44.3	21	41:37.9	+1:39.8
11	15	Evi Sachenbacher-Stehle	Germany	21:38.3	12	26.7	19:32.9	13	41:37.9	+1:39.8
12	14	Olga Zavyalova	Russia	21:35.7	11	26.6	19:36.0	16	41:38.3	+1:40.2
13	5	Irina Khazova	Russia	22:07.0	18	28.9	19:20.2	9	41:56.1	+1:58.0
14	13	Valentyna Shevchenko	Ukraine	22:06.6	17	24.5	19:27.6	12	41:58.7	+2:00.6
15	8	Riitta-Liisa Roponen	Finland	22:20.4	31	22.2	19:17.6	6	42:00.2	+2:02.1
16	36	Silvia Rupil	Italy	22:18.2	28	24.0	19:19.4	8	42:01.6	+2:03.5
17	61	Barbara Jezeršek	Slovenia	22:16.2	26	24.1	19:36.7	17	42:17.0	+2:18.9
18	21	Sabina Valbusa	Italy	22:11.0	22	26.8	19:41.6	19	42:19.4	+2:21.3
19	26	Karine Laurent Philippot	France	22:11.5	23	24.5	19:45.2	22	42:21.2	+2:23.1
20	27	Masako Ishida	Japan	21:57.8	14	24.7	20:01.8	31	42:24.3	+2:26.2
21	20	Riikka Sarasoja	Finland	22:20.8	32	24.6	19:39.0	18	42:24.4	+2:26.3
22	40	Nicole Fessel	Germany	22:30.3	36	28.3	19:26.5	10	42:25.1	+2:27.0
23	25	Kamila Rajdlová	Czech Republic	22:06.0	16	26.8	19:53.7	25	42:26.5	+2:28.4
24	19	Katrin Zeller	Germany	21:51.9	13	27.7	20:07.3	34	42:26.9	+2:28.8
25	18	Svetlana Malahova-Shishkina	Kazakhstan	22:19.2	29	25.6	19:42.3	20	42:27.1	+2:29.0
26	17	Olga Rocheva	Russia	22:07.5	19	29.1	19:53.9	26	42:30.5	+2:32.4
27	35	Laura Orgue	Spain	22:15.2	25	26.5	19:56.6	28	42:38.3	+2:40.2
28	22	Elena Kolomina	Kazakhstan	22:22.5	34	27.9	19:58.0	29	42:48.4	+2:50.3
29	31	Kateřina Smutná	Austria	22:19.7	30	28.0	20:02.6	32	42:50.3	+2:52.2
30	24	Pirjo Muranen	Finland	22:10.4	21	25.7	20:14.4	40	42:50.5	+2:52.4
31	41	Tetyana Zavalíy	Ukraine	22:21.2	33	30.4	19:59.1	30	42:50.7	+2:52.6
32	37	Aurore Cuinet	France	21:59.8	15	42.9	20:09.0	35	42:51.7	+2:53.6
33	38	Oxana Yatskaya	Kazakhstan	22:10.1	20	29.0	20:13.9	37	42:53.0	+2:54.9
34	46	Sylwia Jaśkowiec	Poland	22:30.0	35	28.6	19:56.2	27	42:54.8	+2:56.7
35	52	Kornelia Marek	Poland	22:17.7	27	25.2	20:14.0	39	42:56.9	+2:58.8
36	29	Stefanie Böhler	Germany	22:12.0	24	26.2	20:39.7	45	43:17.9	+3:19.8
37	34	Li Hongxue	China	22:44.1	39	26.3	20:13.9	37	43:24.3	+3:26.2
38	44	Morgan Arritola	United States	23:06.6	43	28.8	19:50.5	24	43:25.9	+3:27.8
39	32	Alena Sannikova	Belarus	22:34.5	37	27.1	20:32.1	43	43:33.7	+3:35.6
40	12	Yevgeniya Medvedeva	Russia	23:27.9	49	25.8	20:05.9	33	43:59.6	+4:01.5
41	54	Madeleine Williams	Canada	23:09.3	44	29.2	20:32.7	44	44:11.2	+4:13.1
42	48	Ida Ingemarsdotter	Sweden	22:43.3	38	24.4	21:08.8	53	44:16.5	+4:18.4
43	59	Caitlin Compton	United States	24:01.2	56	35.3	19:46.8	23	44:23.3	+4:25.2
44	47	Tatjana Mannima	Estonia	23:01.9	42	28.7	20:53.6	48	44:24.2	+4:26.1
45	43	Cécile Storti	France	23:41.7	54	30.0	20:12.6	36	44:24.3	+4:26.2
46	58	Vita Yakymchuk	Ukraine	23:30.2	50	24.9	20:29.7	42	44:24.8	+4:26.7
47	50	Daria Gaiazova	Canada	23:00.6	40	30.1	21:05.2	51	44:35.9	+4:37.8
48	53	Marina Matrosova	Kazakhstan	23:13.0	46	30.9	20:52.3	46	44:36.2	+4:38.1
49	60	Emilie Vina	France	23:01.1	41	27.3	21:16.6	56	44:45.0	+4:46.9
50	45	Ekaterina Rudakova	Belarus	24:01.8	57	26.1	20:22.6	41	44:50.5	+4:52.4
51	39	Eva Nývltová	Czech Republic	23:23.9	48	29.1	20:59.8	49	44:52.8	+4:54.7
52	62	Paulina Maciuszek	Poland	23:23.0	47	33.4	21:00.2	50	44:56.6	+4:58.5
53	30	Britta Johansson Norgren	Sweden	23:46.6	55	27.0	21:12.1	54	45:25.7	+5:27.6
54	49	Nastassia Dubarezava	Belarus	23:35.4	52	29.6	21:22.9	57	45:27.9	+5:29.8
55	57	Monika Gyorgy	Romania	24:18.9	59	26.2	20:52.4	47	45:37.5	+5:39.4
56	51	Holly Brooks	United States	23:38.2	53	28.7	21:31.9	58	45:38.8	+5:40.7
57	64	Perianne Jones	Canada	23:30.6	51	27.0	21:51.1	59	45:48.7	+5:50.6
58	42	Liz Stephen	United States	24:21.3	60	27.2	21:05.3	52	45:53.8	+5:55.7
59	67	Lee Chae-Won	South Korea	25:48.9	62	29.9	21:15.8	55	47:34.6	+7:36.5
60	65	Anja Eržen	Slovenia	24:18.5	58	30.0	23:34.4	62	48:22.9	+8:24.8
61	68	Kelime Çetinkaya	Turkey	25:12.7	61	29.3	23:04.0	60	48:46.0	+8:47.9
62	66	Antonia Grigorova	Bulgaria	25:59.7	63	26.3	23:05.5	61	49:31.5	+9:33.4
	56	Maryna Antsybor	Ukraine	23:11.1	45	29.7	DNF			
	10	Vibeke Skofterud	Norway	DNF						
	16	Kristina Šmigun-Vähi	Estonia	DNF						
	55	Kaija Udras	Estonia	DNF						
	33	Ivana Janečková	Czech Republic	DNS						
	63	Katherine Calder	New Zealand	DNS						
