= FIS Nordic World Ski Championships 2011 – Women's team sprint =

Women's team sprint at the FIS Nordic World Ski Championships 2011
- Venue: Holmenkollen National Arena
- Date: 2 March 2011
- Competitors: 32 from 16 nations
- Teams: 16
- Winning time: 19:25.0

Medalists
gold medal	Ida Ingemarsdotter; Charlotte Kalla	Sweden
silver medal	Aino Kaisa Saarinen; Krista Lähteenmäki	Finland
bronze medal	Maiken Caspersen Falla; Astrid Uhrenholdt Jacobsen	Norway

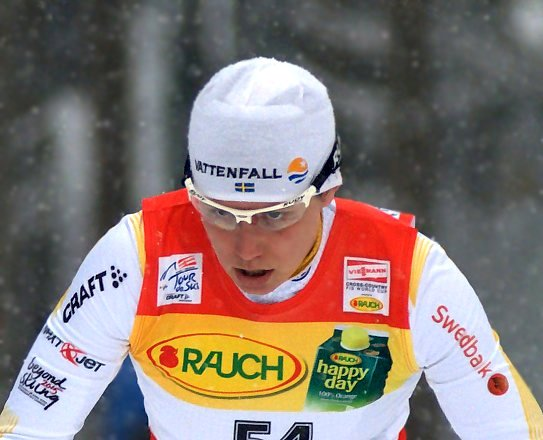
FIS Nordic World Ski Championships 2011 – Women's team sprint

The Women's team sprint at the FIS Nordic World Ski Championships 2011 was held on 2 March 2011. Sprint qualifying at 12:00 CET with finals at 14:15 CET. The defending world champions were Finland's Virpi Kuitunen and Aino-Kaisa Saarinen while the defending Olympic champions were Germany's Evi Sachenbacher-Stehle and Claudia Nystad. Kuitunen retired after the 2009-10 season.

== Results ==
=== Semifinals ===
Semifinal 1

Rank	Heat	Bib	Country	Athlete	Time	Note
1	1	1	Slovenia	Katja Višnar; Petra Majdič	19:58.6	Q
2	1	2	Norway	Maiken Caspersen Falla; Astrid Uhrenholdt Jacobsen	19:59.6	Q
3	1	3	Sweden	Ida Ingemarsdotter; Charlotte Kalla	20:00.2	Q
4	1	5	Canada	Perianne Jones; Daria Gaiazova	20:36.9	q
5	1	4	Japan	Masako Ishida; Madoka Natsumi	20:41.0	q
6	1	7	Czech Republic	Eva Nývltová; Ivana Janečková	21:08.1	out
7	1	6	Kazakhstan	Oxana Yatskaya; Tatyana Roshchina	21:16.9	out
8	1	8	Ukraine	Zoya Zaviedieieva; Vita Yakymchuk	22:45.7	out

Semifinal 2

Rank	Heat	Bib	Country	Athlete	Time	Note
1	2	9	Finland	Aino-Kaisa Saarinen; Krista Lähteenmäki	20:04.0	Q
2	2	10	Italy	Arianna Follis; Marianna Longa	20:04.0	Q
3	2	12	United States	Sadie Bjornsen; Kikkan Randall	20:31.9	Q
4	2	11	Germany	Stefanie Böhler; Nicole Fessel	20:33.9	q
5	2	13	Russia	Anastasia Dotsenko; Yuliya Ivanova	20:48.6	q
6	2	14	Estonia	Piret Pormeister; Triin Ojaste	20:55.6	out
7	2	16	Lithuania	Lina Kreivenaitė; Ingrida Ardišauskaitė	22:50.2	out
8	2	15	United Kingdom	Rosamund Musgrave; Sarah Young	23:31.8	out

=== Final ===
Rank	Bib	Country	Athlete	Time	Deficit
1st place, gold medalist(s)	3	Sweden	Ida Ingemarsdotter; Charlotte Kalla	19:25.0	
2nd place, silver medalist(s)	9	Finland	Aino Kaisa Saarinen; Krista Lähteenmäki	19:28.3	+3.3
3rd place, bronze medalist(s)	2	Norway	Maiken Caspersen Falla; Astrid Uhrenholdt Jacobsen	19:29.1	+4.1
4	10	Italy	Arianna Follis; Marianna Longa	19:40.1	+15.1
5	1	Slovenia	Katja Višnar; Petra Majdič	19:43.5	+18.5
6	5	Canada	Perianne Jones; Daria Gaiazova	20:11.9	+46.9
7	11	Germany	Stefanie Böhler; Nicole Fessel	20:12.8	+47.8
8	4	Japan	Masako Ishida; Madoka Natsumi	20:19.1	+54.1
9	12	United States	Sadie Bjornsen; Kikkan Randall	20:21.5	+56.5
10	13	Russia	Anastasia Dotsenko; Yuliya Ivanova	20:23.3	+58.3
