= FIS Nordic World Ski Championships 2011 – Women's 30 kilometre freestyle =

Women's 30 kilometre freestyle at the FIS Nordic World Ski Championships 2011
- Venue: Holmenkollen National Arena
- Date: 5 March 2011
- Competitors: 57
- Winning time: 1:23:45.1

Medalists
| gold medal | Therese Johaug | Norway |
| silver medal | Marit Bjørgen | Norway |
| bronze medal | Justyna Kowalczyk | Poland |

The Women's 30 kilometre freestyle at the FIS Nordic World Ski Championships 2011 was held on 5 March 2011 at 12:00 CET. Poland's Justyna Kowalczyk is both the defending world and Olympic champion. Norwegian Therese Johaug won after a dash in the steepest hills giving her the lead for most of the race.

== Results ==
| Rank | Bib | Athlete | Country | Time | Deficit |
|---|---|---|---|---|---|
| 1st place, gold medalist(s) | 4 | Therese Johaug | Norway | 1:23:45.1 | |
| 2nd place, silver medalist(s) | 2 | Marit Bjørgen | Norway | 1:24:29.1 | +44.0 |
| 3rd place, bronze medalist(s) | 1 | Justyna Kowalczyk | Poland | 1:25:19.1 | +1:34.0 |
| 4 | 5 | Charlotte Kalla | Sweden | 1:25:50.6 | +2:05.5 |
| 5 | 15 | Kristin Størmer Steira | Norway | 1:26:05.9 | +2:20.8 |
| 6 | 13 | Vibeke Skofterud | Norway | 1:26:21.5 | +2:36.4 |
| 7 | 17 | Nicole Fessel | Germany | 1:26:49.0 | +3:03.9 |
| 8 | 3 | Marianna Longa | Italy | 1:26:54.9 | +3:09.8 |
| 9 | 31 | Antonella Confortola Wyatt | Italy | 1:26:55.3 | +3:10.2 |
| 10 | 9 | Anna Haag | Sweden | 1:26:56.5 | +3:11.4 |
| 11 | 10 | Krista Lähteenmäki | Finland | 1:27:42.1 | +3:57.0 |
| 12 | 12 | Katrin Zeller | Germany | 1:27:45.8 | +4:00.7 |
| 13 | 23 | Evi Sachenbacher-Stehle | Germany | 1:28:17.9 | +4:32.8 |
| 14 | 14 | Valentyna Shevchenko | Ukraine | 1:28:43.8 | +4:58.7 |
| 15 | 8 | Riitta-Liisa Roponen | Finland | 1:29:52.6 | +6:07.5 |
| 16 | 37 | Elizabeth Stephen | United States | 1:30:07.3 | +6:22.2 |
| 17 | 25 | Valentina Novikova | Russia | 1:30:18.9 | +6:33.8 |
| 18 | 21 | Kikkan Randall | United States | 1:30:57.3 | +7:12.2 |
| 19 | 43 | Silvana Bucher | Switzerland | 1:30:59.9 | +7:14.8 |
| 20 | 32 | Ivana Janečková | Czech Republic | 1:31:01.4 | +7:16.3 |
| 21 | 42 | Morgan Arritola | United States | 1:31:09.8 | +7:24.7 |
| 22 | 29 | Barbara Jezeršek | Slovenia | 1:31:33.7 | +7:48.6 |
| 23 | 7 | Aino-Kaisa Saarinen | Finland | 1:31:39.4 | +7:54.3 |
| 24 | 50 | Lada Nesterenko | Ukraine | 1:31:39.5 | +7:54.4 |
| 25 | 33 | Holly Brooks | United States | 1:31:42.5 | +7:57.4 |
| 26 | 11 | Yuliya Chekalyova | Russia | 1:31:47.8 | +8:02.7 |
| 27 | 46 | Yuki Kobayashi | Japan | 1:32:04.7 | +8:19.6 |
| 28 | 48 | Mirjam Cossettini | Slovenia | 1:32:10.5 | +8:25.4 |
| 29 | 34 | Eva Nývltová | Czech Republic | 1:32:11.3 | +8:26.2 |
| 30 | 36 | Sara Lindborg | Sweden | 1:32:17.4 | +8:32.3 |
| 31 | 22 | Britta Johansson Norgren | Sweden | 1:32:32.7 | +8:47.6 |
| 32 | 26 | Anastasia Dotsenko | Russia | 1:32:36.1 | +8:51.0 |
| 33 | 18 | Riikka Sarasoja | Finland | 1:32:46.1 | +9:01.0 |
| 34 | 30 | Elena Kolomina | Kazakhstan | 1:33:08.2 | +9:23.1 |
| 35 | 19 | Laure Barthélémy | France | 1:33:29.6 | +9:44.5 |
| 36 | 28 | Svetlana Malakhova-Shishkina | Kazakhstan | 1:34:21.5 | +10:36.4 |
| 37 | 51 | Oxana Yatskaya | Kazakhstan | 1:34:30.7 | +10:45.6 |
| 38 | 45 | Laura Orgué | Spain | 1:34:45.4 | +11:00.3 |
| 39 | 27 | Denise Herrmann | Germany | 1:35:10.6 | +11:25.5 |
| 40 | 47 | Maryna Antsybor | Ukraine | 1:35:16.8 | +11:31.7 |
| 41 | 40 | Alena Sannikova | Belarus | 1:35:32.3 | +11:47.2 |
| 42 | 49 | Chandra Crawford | Canada | 1:35:51.2 | +12:06.1 |
| 43 | 41 | Paulina Maciuszek | Poland | 1:36:09.8 | +12:24.7 |
| 44 | 39 | Brooke Gosling | Canada | 1:36:56.6 | +13:11.5 |
| 45 | 44 | Émilie Vina | France | 1:37:02.2 | +13:17.1 |
| 46 | 54 | Marina Matrosova | Kazakhstan | 1:37:23.3 | +13:38.2 |
| 47 | 53 | Agnieszka Szymańczak | Poland | 1:37:28.6 | +13:43.5 |
| 48 | 38 | Célia Bourgeois | France | 1:39:32.4 | +15:47.3 |
| 49 | 56 | Niviaq Chemnitz Berthelsen | Denmark | 1:47:09.9 | +23:24.8 |
| 50 | 55 | Rosamund Musgrave | United Kingdom | 1:48:05.3 | +24:20.2 |
| 51 | 57 | Mirlene Picin | Brazil | 1:55:11.7 | +31:26.6 |
| | 20 | Silvia Rupil | Italy | DNF | |
| | 35 | Aurore Jéan | France | DNF | |
| | 52 | Vita Yakymchuk | Ukraine | DNF | |
| | 6 | Arianna Follis | Italy | DNS | |
| | 16 | Masako Ishida | Japan | DNS | |
| | 24 | Olga Mikhailova | Russia | DNS | |
