= Whistler Olympic Park =

Winter sports venue in Canada

Coordinates: 50°8′7″N 123°7′9″W

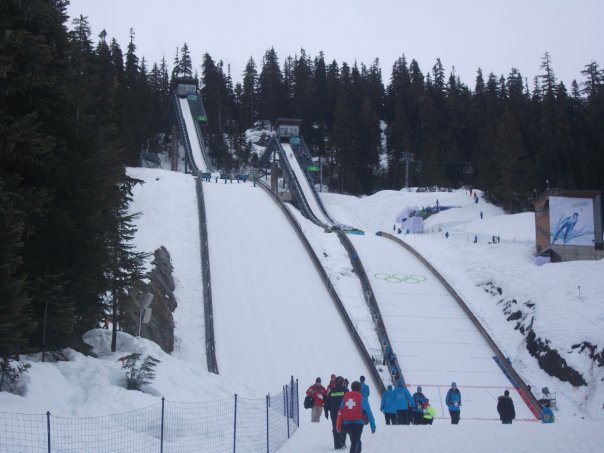
Whistler Olympic Park: two ski jumps (HS 140 and HS 106 metre)

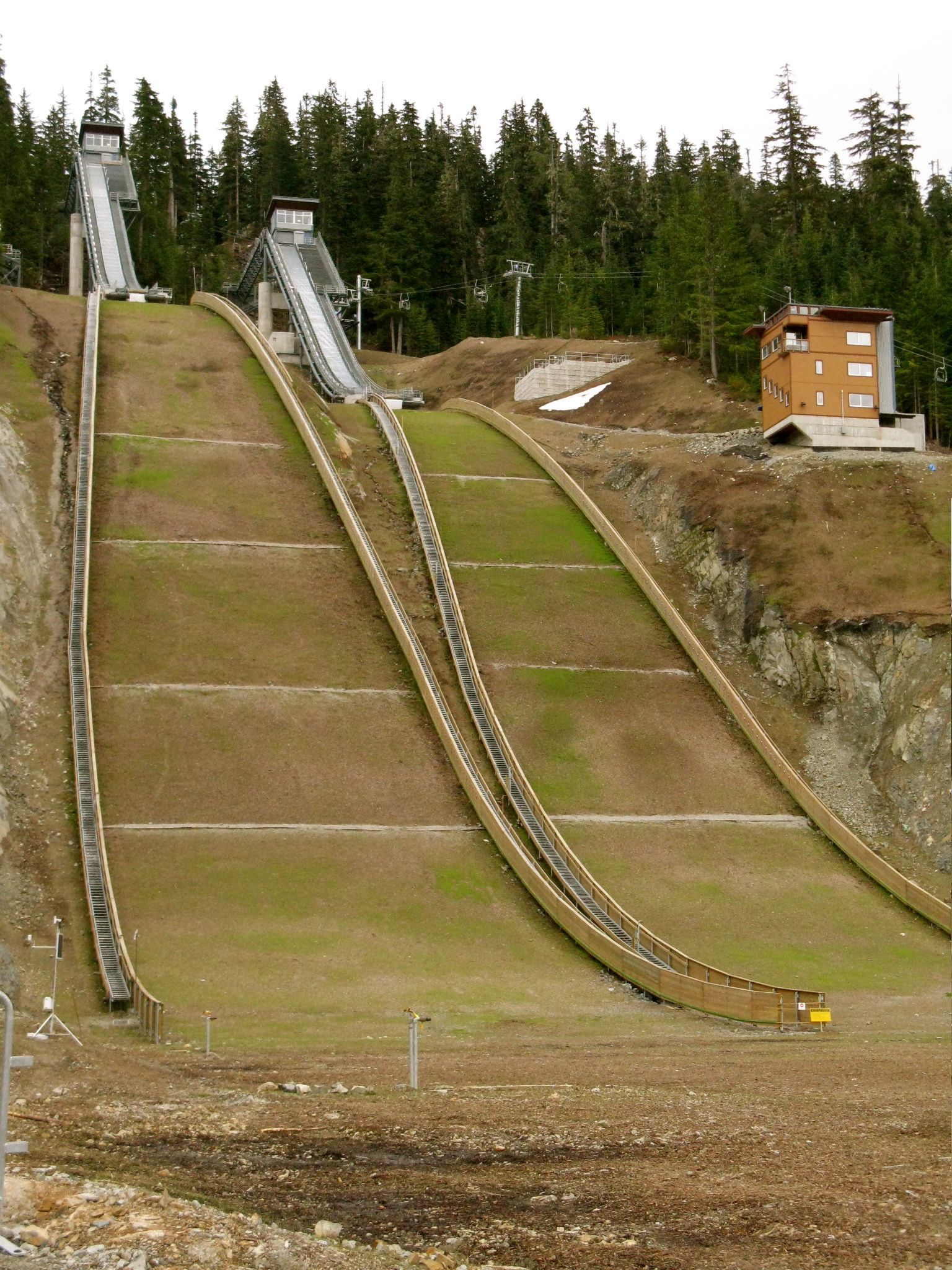
Summer picture

The Whistler Olympic Park is the location of the Nordic and Biathlon events facilities for the 2010 Winter Olympics and is located in the Madeley Creek basin in the Callaghan Valley, west of Whistler, British Columbia, Canada. The facility hosted the biathlon, cross-country skiing, Nordic combined, and ski jumping. After the Olympics the park remains a public facility, complementing the extensive wilderness trails and alpine routes already in use. Three temporary stadiums were built with a capacity for 12,000 spectators each (6,000 for the Paralympics). The location is approximately 8 km from the junction of its access road with Highway 99 and 14 km from the Whistler Olympic Village.

The two year construction project saw, 14 km (8.7 mi) of cross country and biathlon trails, two ski jumps (HS 106 and HS 140 metre), and another 20 to 25 km of recreational trails built. There is also a permanent Biathlon range which can be used daily. Overall, $119.7 million was spent on the facilities in the Callaghan Valley. Permanent features were completed in the fall of 2007. It is now a public cross-country and back country ski facility.

Located between the ski jumps and cross country area there is an 11,000-square-foot (1,000 m^{2}) Day Lodge. Which has a gift shop, cafeteria, washrooms, lounge and rental centre. In addition to the Lodge, there are two 6,000-square-foot (560 m^{2}) Technical Buildings, one for Cross Country and one for Biathlon located at each of the sports main venue area of the park. There are also other necessary infrastructure facilities on site.

The park was officially opened to the public on November 22, 2008 at noon PST despite having no snow the previous evening. Inauguration took place at the day lodge to mark the start of the public skiing season. 500 people daily would use the lodge during weekends and 100 during a regular weekday.

During the Olympics the park was managed by VANOC, it is now owned and operated by Whistler 2010 Sport Legacies. They also operate the Sliding Centre and Training Centre.

World Cup competitions at the park took place the weekend of January 15–18, 2009 for cross-country skiing and Nordic combined. Eleven Nordic combined teams totalling 50 skiers and 47 support staff along with 17 cross country teams with about 230 skiers participated in the event. Ski jumping World Cup at the venue took place on the weekend of January 22–25, 2009. The Park is the first venue in 2009 to have its operational readiness tested for the upcoming Games in 2010.

Winners of the test events for cross country skiing were Slovakia's Alena Prochazkova in women's sprint, Emil Jönsson of Sweden in the men's sprint, Justyna Kowalczyk of Poland in the women's double pursuit, Italy's Pietro Piller Cottrer in the men's double pursuit, and in the team sprint, the winners were Italy for the women (Magda Genuin and Arianna Follis) and Sweden for the men (Jönsson and Robin Bryntesson). The Nordic combined winners were Bill Demong of the United States on the 16th and Norway's Magnus Moan on the 17th. Austria's Gregor Schlierenzauer won both ski jumping test events.
