= Cross-country skiing at the 2010 Winter Olympics – Women's team sprint =

Women's team sprint at the XXI Olympic Winter Games
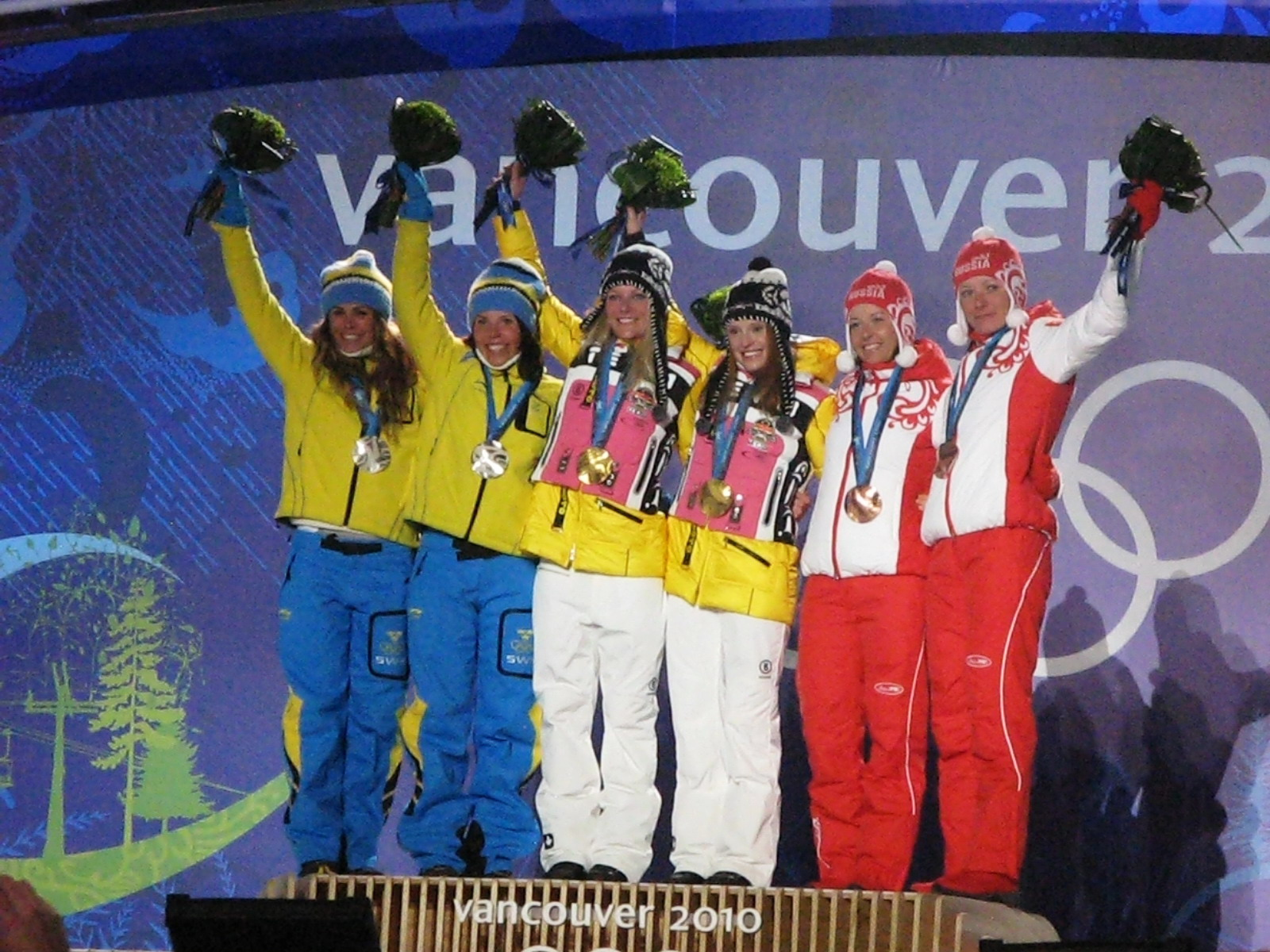
- The medal ceremony. From left: Sweden (silver), Germany (gold), Russia (bronze)
- Venue: Whistler Olympic Park
- Dates: 22 February 2010
- Competitors: 36 from 18 nations
- Winning time: 18:03.7

Medalists
1st place, gold medalist(s)		Evi Sachenbacher-Stehle; Claudia Nystad	Germany
2nd place, silver medalist(s)		Charlotte Kalla; Anna Haag	Sweden
3rd place, bronze medalist(s)		Irina Khazova; Natalya Korostelyova	Russia

The women's team sprint cross-country skiing competition in the freestyle technique at the 2010 Winter Olympics in Vancouver, Canada was held on 22 February at Whistler Olympic Park in Whistler, British Columbia.

The Swedish team of Lina Andersson and Anna Dahlberg (Olsson since 2008) were the defending Olympic champions when the technique was classical. The defending world champions were the Finnish duo of Virpi Kuitunen and Aino-Kaisa Saarinen, the defending Olympic bronze medalists, when the technique was also classical. Italy's team of Magda Genuin and Arianna Follis won the test event that took place at the Olympic venue on 18 January 2009. The last World Cup event in this format prior to the 2010 Games took place in Rybinsk, Russia on 24 January 2010 and was won by the German team of Stefanie Böhler and Evi Sachenbacher-Stehle.

== Results ==
=== Semifinals ===
The semifinals took place at 10:45 and 11:10 PST.

Rank	Heat	Bib	Country	Athlete	Time	Note
1	1	6	France	Karine Laurent Philippot; Laure Barthélémy	18:42.2	Q
2	1	1	Italy	Magda Genuin; Arianna Follis	18:43.0	Q
3	1	3	Germany	Evi Sachenbacher-Stehle; Claudia Nystad	18:43.5	Q
4	1	8	Poland	Kornelia Marek; Sylwia Jaśkowiec	18:44.1	q
5	1	4	Russia	Irina Khazova; Natalya Korostelyova	18:48.0	q
6	1	2	Finland	Riitta-Liisa Roponen; Riikka Sarasoja	18:53.8	q
7	1	5	Japan	Nobuko Fukuda; Madoka Natsumi	19:51.7	
8	1	9	Ukraine	Kateryna Grygorenko; Maryna Antsybor	19:55.6	
9	1	7	Switzerland	Bettina Gruber; Silvana Bucher	20:04.6	
1	2	12	Sweden	Charlotte Kalla; Anna Haag	18:35.9	Q
2	2	11	Norway	Astrid Jacobsen; Celine Brun-Lie	18:47.2	Q
3	2	16	United States	Caitlin Compton; Kikkan Randall	18:48.9	Q
4	2	14	Canada	Daria Gaiazova; Sara Renner	18:54.9	q
5	2	10	Slovenia	Katja Višnar; Vesna Fabjan	18:58.9	
6	2	15	Kazakhstan	Oxana Yatskaya; Elena Kolomina	19:33.6	
7	2	17	Belarus	Ekaterina Rudakova; Olga Vasiljonok	19:52.3	
8	2	13	Estonia	Triin Ojaste; Kaija Udras	20:02.2	
9	2	18	China	Man Dandan; Li Hongxue	20:02.7	

=== Final ===
The following are the results of the event.

Defending Olympic champion Sweden won silver under a different team. Finland, the defending world champions, finished a disappointing eighth under a different team. Test event winners Italy finished fourth with the same team members. Germany, the last winners prior to the Olympics in this event, won gold with Nystad replacing Böhler.

Rank	Bib	Country	Athlete	Time	Deficit
1st place, gold medalist(s)	3	Germany	Evi Sachenbacher-Stehle; Claudia Nystad	18:03.7	—
2nd place, silver medalist(s)	12	Sweden	Charlotte Kalla; Anna Haag	18:04.3	+0.6
3rd place, bronze medalist(s)	4	Russia	Irina Khazova; Natalya Korostelyova	18:07.7	+4.0
4	1	Italy	Magda Genuin; Arianna Follis	18:14.2	+10.5
5	11	Norway	Astrid Jacobsen; Celine Brun-Lie	18:32.8	+29.1
6	16	United States	Caitlin Compton; Kikkan Randall	18:51.6	+47.9
7	14	Canada	Daria Gaiazova; Sara Renner	18:51.8	+48.1
8	2	Finland	Riitta-Liisa Roponen; Riikka Sarasoja	18:56.6	+52.9
9	8	Poland	Kornelia Marek; Sylwia Jaśkowiec	18:59.1	+55.4
10	6	France	Karine Laurent Philippot; Laure Barthélémy	19:04.2	+1:00.5
