= Riikka Sarasoja-Lilja =

Finnish cross-country skier

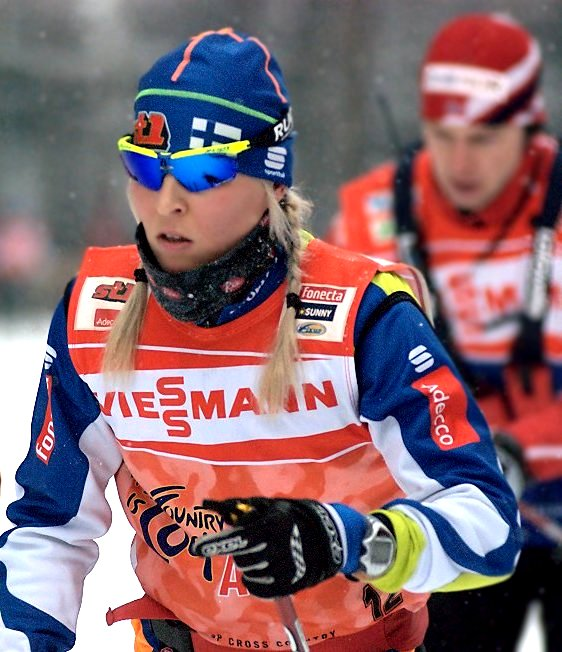

Personal information
- Born: 23 February 1982 (age 44) Lempäälä, Finland

Sport
- Sport: Skiing
- Club: Lappeen Riento

World Cup career
- Seasons: 14 – (2002–2015)
- Indiv. starts: 183
- Indiv. podiums: 0
- Team starts: 21
- Team podiums: 6
- Team wins: 0
- Overall titles: 0 – (24th in 2012)
- Discipline titles: 0
Medal record
Women's cross-country skiing
Representing Finland
World Championships
Bronze medal – third place	2013 Val di Fiemme	Team sprint
Junior World Championships
Gold medal – first place	2001 Karpacz	4 × 5 km relay

Riikka Sarasoja-Lilja (born February 23, 1982, in Lempäälä, Pirkanmaa) is a Finnish cross-country skier who has competed since 2001. At the 2010 Winter Olympics in Vancouver, she finished eighth in the team sprint, 13th in the 30 km, 21st in the 7.5 km + 7.5 km double pursuit, and 31st in the 10 km events.

At the FIS Nordic World Ski Championships 2009 in Liberec, Sarasoja finished 21st in the individual sprint, 24th in the 7.5 km + 7.5 km double pursuit, and 25th in the 30 km events.

Her best World Cup finish was sixth in a sprint event in Finland in 2009.

== Cross-country skiing results ==
All results are sourced from the International Ski Federation (FIS).

=== Olympic Games ===
Year	Age	10 km individual	15 km skiathlon	30 km mass start	Sprint	4 × 5 km relay	Team sprint
2010	28	31	21	12	—	—	8
2014	32	—	—	—	36	—	—

=== World Championships ===
- 1 medal – (1 bronze)

Year	Age	10 km individual	15 km skiathlon	30 km mass start	Sprint	4 × 5 km relay	Team sprint
2009	27	—	24	24	20	—	—
2011	29	—	18	33	27	—	—
2013	31	12	—	—	—	5	3rd
2015	33	—	—	—	—	—	10

=== World Cup ===
Season Standings
Season	Age	Discipline standings			Ski Tour standings		
Season	Age	Overall	Distance	Sprint	Nordic Opening	Tour de Ski	World Cup Final
2002	20	NC	—N/a	—	—N/a	—N/a	—N/a
2003	21	76	—N/a	53	—N/a	—N/a	—N/a
2004	22	51	61	29	—N/a	—N/a	—N/a
2005	23	64	NC	39	—N/a	—N/a	—N/a
2006	24	55	NC	30	—N/a	—N/a	—N/a
2007	25	NC	NC	NC	—N/a	—	—N/a
2008	26	50	38	45	—N/a	—	27
2009	27	36	36	27	—N/a	—	42
2010	28	26	29	27	—N/a	14	DNF
2011	29	26	24	27	21	18	24
2012	30	24	19	24	21	DNF	32
2013	31	27	23	30	15	DNF	22
2014	32	74	NC	46	48	DNF	—
2015	33	56	81	25	42	—	—N/a

==== Team podiums ====
- 6 podiums – (6 RL)

No.	Season	Date	Location	Race	Level	Place	Teammates
1	2003–04	11 January 2004	Otepää, Estonia	4 × 5 km Relay C/F	World Cup	3rd	Välimaa / Saarinen / Kuitunen
2	2003–04	22 February 2004	Umeå, Sweden	4 × 5 km Relay C/F	World Cup	3rd	Saarinen / Salonen / Venäläinen
3	2007–08	25 November 2007	Beitostølen, Norway	4 × 5 km Relay C/F	World Cup	3rd	Saarinen / Roponen / Muranen
4	2007–08	24 February 2008	Falun, Sweden	4 × 5 km Relay C/F	World Cup	2nd	Kuitunen / Saarinen / Roponen
5	2011–12	20 November 2011	Sjusjøen, Norway	4 × 5 km Relay C/F	World Cup	3rd	Lähteenmäki / Saarinen / Roponen
6	2011–12	12 February 2012	Nové Město, Czech Republic	4 × 5 km Relay C/F	World Cup	2nd	Saarinen / Roponen / Lähteenmäki
