= Roponen =

Surname list

Roponen is a Finnish surname. Notable people with the surname include:

- Riitta-Liisa Roponen (born 1978), Finnish cross-country skier
- Toni Roponen (born 1973), Finnish cross-country coach and commentator
