= Juha Lallukka =

Finnish cross-country skier

Personal information
- Nationality: Finland
- Born: 27 October 1979 (age 46) Kouvola, Finland

Sport
- Sport: Skiing
- Club: Kouvolan Hiihtoseura

World Cup career
- Seasons: 10 – (2002–2011)
- Indiv. starts: 22
- Indiv. podiums: 1
- Indiv. wins: 0
- Team starts: 5
- Team podiums: 0
- Overall titles: 0 – (57th in 2005)
- Discipline titles: 0

Juha Lallukka (born 27 October 1979 in Kouvola) is a Finnish cross-country skier who competed between 2002 and 2018. He finished 34th in the 15 km event at the 2010 Winter Olympics in Vancouver, British Columbia, Canada.

Lallukka's best finish at the FIS Nordic World Ski Championships, was fourth in the 4 × 10 km relay in Oslo in 2011 while, his best individual finish was eighth in the 50 km event at the same championships.

His best World Cup result was a third-fastest stage time in the 15 km pursuit race in Falun in 2009.

On 16 November 2011, it was reported that he had tested positive for HGH. He was banned for two years.

== Cross-country skiing results ==
All results are sourced from the International Ski Federation (FIS).

=== Olympic Games ===
Year	Age	15 km individual	30 km skiathlon	50 km mass start	Sprint	4 × 10 km relay	Team sprint
2010	30	34	—	—	—	—	—

=== World Championships ===
Year	Age	15 km individual	30 km skiathlon	50 km mass start	Sprint	4 × 10 km relay	Team sprint
2005	26	32	—	—	—	—	—
2007	28	11	—	—	—	6	—
2009	30	—	—	15	—	—	—
2011	32	—	—	8	—	4	—

=== World Cup ===
==== Season standings ====
Season	Age	Discipline standings			Ski Tour standings		
Season	Age	Overall	Distance	Sprint	Nordic Opening	Tour de Ski	World Cup Final
2002	22	NC	—N/a	—	—N/a	—N/a	—N/a
2003	23	NC	—N/a	—	—N/a	—N/a	—N/a
2004	24	143	102	—	—N/a	—N/a	—N/a
2005	25	57	35	—	—N/a	—N/a	—N/a
2006	26	NC	NC	—	—N/a	—N/a	—N/a
2007	27	117	67	—	—N/a	—	—N/a
2008	28	124	69	—	—N/a	—	—
2009	29	74	47	NC	—N/a	—	29
2010	30	NC	NC	—	—N/a	—	—
2011	31	97	54	—	—	—	—

==== Individual podiums ====
- 1 podium – (1 SWC)

No.	Season	Date	Location	Race	Level	Place
1	2008–09	22 March 2009	Falun, Sweden	15 km Pursuit F	Stage World Cup	3rd
