= Kati Sundqvist =

Finnish cross-country skier

Kati Venäläinen-Sundqvist
Personal information
- Nationality: Finland
- Born: 15 February 1975 (age 51) Noormarkku, Finland

Sport
- Sport: Skiing
- Club: Noormarkun Nopsa

World Cup career
- Seasons: 13 – (1995–2007)
- Indiv. starts: 139
- Indiv. podiums: 1
- Indiv. wins: 0
- Team starts: 33
- Team podiums: 2
- Team wins: 0
- Overall titles: 0 – (20th in 2001)
- Discipline titles: 0
Medal record
Women's cross-country skiing
Representing Finland
World Championships
Silver medal – second place	2001 Lahti	Individual sprint
Junior World Championships
Bronze medal – third place	1995 Gällivare	4 × 5 km relay

Kati Venäläinen-Sundqvist (born Kati Sundqvist on February 15, 1975 in Noormarkku, Satakunta) is a Finnish cross-country skier who has competed since 1995. She won a silver medal in the individual sprint at the 2001 FIS Nordic World Ski Championships in Lahti.

Sundqvist's best individual finish at the Winter Olympics was 16th in the 5 km + 5 km combined pursuit at Salt Lake City in 2002. She has five individual career victories up to 10 km from 2002 to 2005.

== Cross-country skiing results ==
All results are sourced from the International Ski Federation (FIS).

=== Olympic Games ===
Year	Age	5 km	10 km	15 km	Pursuit	30 km	Sprint	4 × 5 km relay	Team sprint
1998	23	—	—N/a	41	—	DNS	—N/a	—	—N/a
2002	27	—N/a	28	—	16	—	18	7	—N/a
2006	31	—N/a	43	—N/a	—	DNF	29	7	—

=== World Championships ===
- 1 medal – (1 silver)

Year	Age	5 km	10 km	15 km	Pursuit	30 km	Sprint	4 × 5 km relay
1997	22	—	—N/a	35	—	—	—N/a	—
1999	24	—	—N/a	32	30	—	—N/a	—
2001	26	—N/a	—	32	—	CNX^{[a]}	Silver	—
2003	28	—N/a	—	—	27	—	15	—

a. ^{1} Cancelled due to extremely cold weather.

=== World Cup ===
==== Season standings ====
Season	Age	Discipline standings					Ski Tour standings
Season	Age	Overall	Distance	Long Distance	Middle Distance	Sprint	Tour de Ski
1995	20	NC	—N/a	—N/a	—N/a	—N/a	—N/a
1996	21	64	—N/a	—N/a	—N/a	—N/a	—N/a
1997	22	39	—N/a	25	—N/a	39	—N/a
1998	23	51	—N/a	NC	—N/a	44	—N/a
1999	24	47	—N/a	64	—N/a	47	—N/a
2000	25	24	—N/a	26	26	14	—N/a
2001	26	20	—N/a	—N/a	—N/a	20	—N/a
2002	27	26	—N/a	—N/a	—N/a	13	—N/a
2003	28	31	—N/a	—N/a	—N/a	12	—N/a
2004	29	45	73	—N/a	—N/a	24	—N/a
2005	30	43	NC	—N/a	—N/a	20	—N/a
2006	31	40	46	—N/a	—N/a	22	—N/a
2007	32	75	62	—N/a	—N/a	59	—

==== Individual podiums ====
- 1 podium

No.	Season	Date	Location	Race	Level	Place
1	1999–00	28 February 2000	Stockholm, Sweden	1.0 km Sprint C	World Cup	3rd

==== Team podiums ====
- 2 podiums – (2 RL)

No.	Season	Date	Location	Race	Level	Place	Teammates
1	2003–04	22 February 2004	Umeå, Sweden	4 × 5 km Relay C/F	World Cup	3rd	Saarinen / Salonen / Sarasoja
2	2006–07	4 February 2007	Davos, Switzerland	4 × 5 km Relay C/F	World Cup	3rd	Manninen / Saarinen / Roponen
