= Virpi Sarasvuo =

Finnish cross-country skier

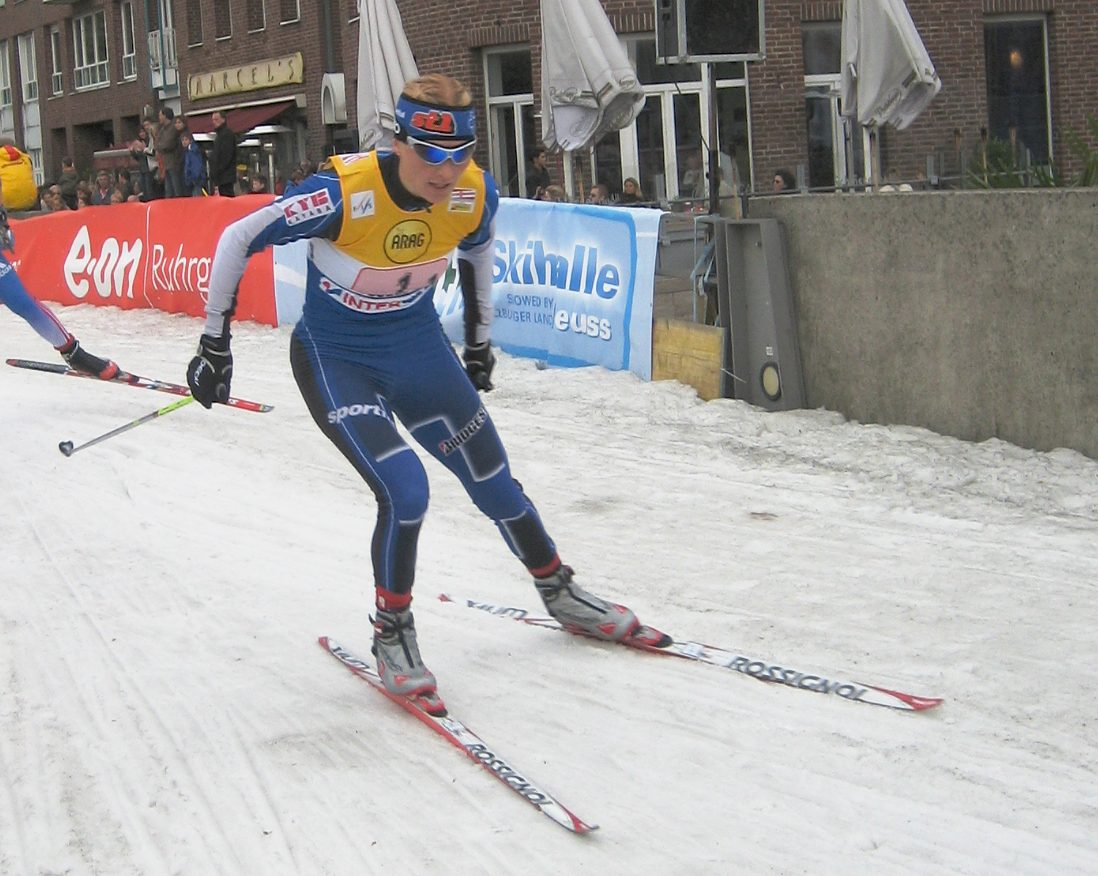

Personal information
- Full name: Virpi Katriina Sarasvuo
- Nationality: Finland
- Born: 20 May 1976 (age 50) Kangasniemi, Finland
- Height: 174 cm (5 ft 9 in)

Sport
- Sport: Skiing
- Club: Kangasniemen Kalske

World Cup career
- Seasons: 14 – (1995, 1997–2001, 2003–2010)
- Indiv. starts: 173
- Indiv. podiums: 52
- Indiv. wins: 27
- Team starts: 32
- Team podiums: 16
- Team wins: 4
- Overall titles: 2 – (2007, 2008)
- Discipline titles: 3 – (2 DI, 1 SP)
Medal record
Women's cross-country skiing
Representing Finland
International nordic ski competitions
Event	1st	2nd	3rd
Olympic Games	0	0	2
World Championships	6	1	1
Total	6	1	3
Olympic Games
Bronze medal – third place	2006 Turin	Team sprint
Bronze medal – third place	2010 Vancouver	4 × 5 km relay
World Championships
Gold medal – first place	2001 Lahti	5 km + 5 km combined pursuit
Gold medal – first place	2007 Sapporo	Team sprint
Gold medal – first place	2007 Sapporo	30 km classical
Gold medal – first place	2007 Sapporo	4 × 5 km relay
Gold medal – first place	2009 Liberec	Team sprint
Gold medal – first place	2009 Liberec	4 × 5 km relay
Silver medal – second place	2005 Oberstdorf	30 km classical
Bronze medal – third place	2007 Sapporo	Individual sprint
Disqualified	2001 Lahti	4 × 5 km relay
Junior World Championships
Bronze medal – third place	1995 Gällivare	4 × 5 km relay

Virpi Katriina Sarasvuo (née Kuitunen, born 20 May 1976) is a Finnish former cross-country skier who competed from 1995 to 2010. She won a bronze medal in the team sprint event (with Aino-Kaisa Saarinen) at the 2006 Winter Olympics in Turin and earned her best individual finish of fifth in the individual sprint event in those same games. Four years later in Vancouver, Kuitunen won another bronze, this time in the 4 × 5 km relay.

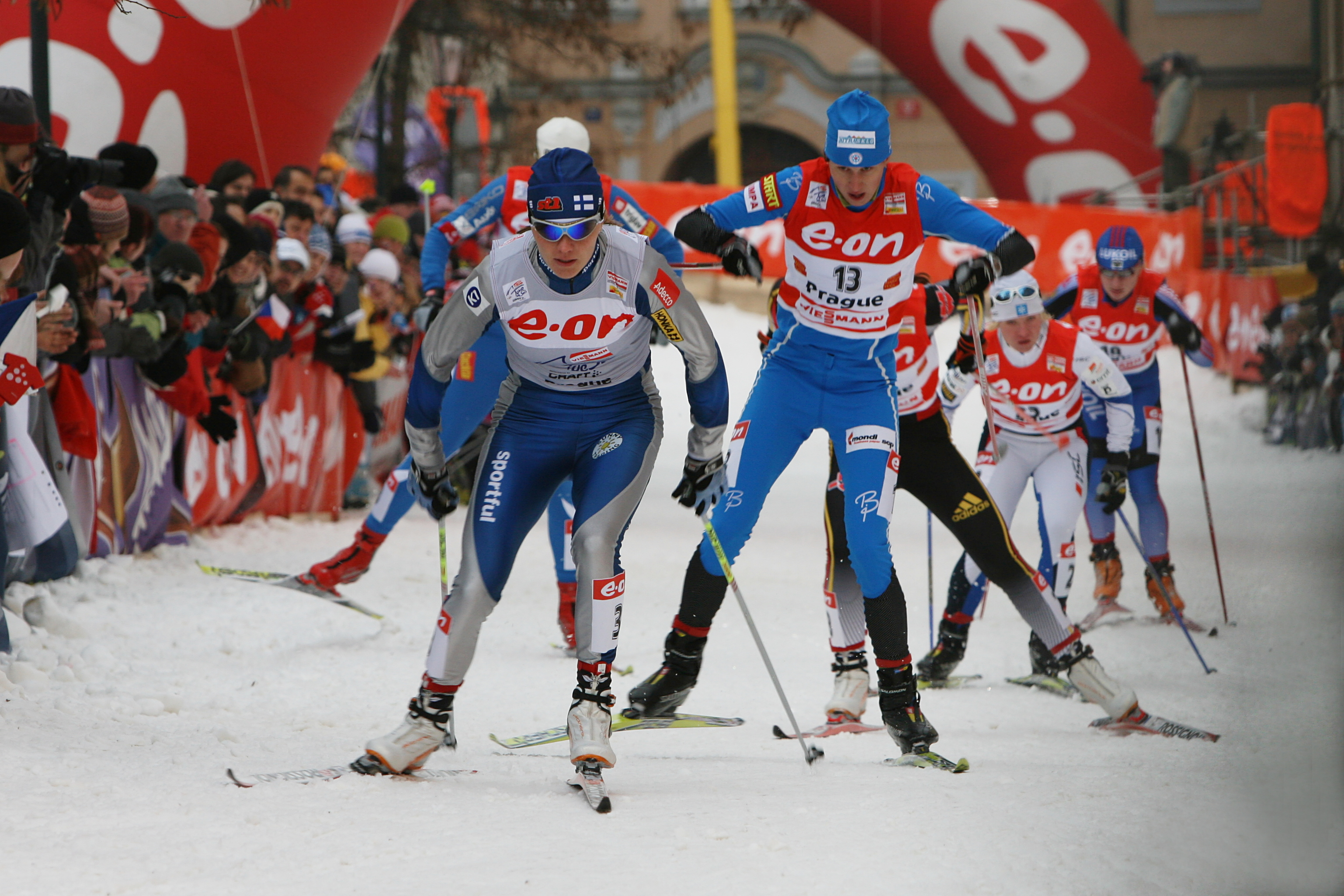
Virpi Kuitunen leading the group in the quarterfinals of Tour de Ski, Prague 2007

Kuitunen has eight medals at the FIS Nordic World Ski Championships with six golds (2001: 5 km + 5 km combined pursuit, 2007: Team sprint, with Riitta-Liisa Roponen, 30 km, & 4 × 5 km; 2009: Team sprint, 4 × 5 km), one silver (2005: 30 km), one bronze (2007: Individual sprint). She also has thirty-four additional individual victories at various levels of various distances since 2000.

Kuitunen won the first ever Tour de Ski competition for women in 2006–07, winning over Norway's Marit Bjørgen by 1:17.5. She also won the overall 2006–07 Cross-Country Skiing World Cup, as well as the sprint World Cup the same season. In the season 2007–08 Kuitunen won the overall again.

Because of Kuitunen's successes in cross-country skiing in 2007, she was awarded Finnish Sportswoman of the Year. Kuitunen also won the Tour de Ski in 2008–09.

Virpi Kuitunen married Jari Sarasvuo on 16 July 2010.

== Doping controversy ==
At the 2001 FIS Nordic World Ski Championships in Lahti, Kuitunen was disqualified when she tested positive for hydroxyethyl starch, a banned blood plasma expander. She was forced to relinquish her silver medal earned in the 4 × 5 km and served a two-year suspension until the 2003 FIS Nordic World Ski Championships.

== Cross-country skiing results ==
All results are sourced from the International Ski Federation (FIS).

=== Olympic Games ===
- 2 medals – (2 bronze)

Year	Age	10 km individual	15 km skiathlon	30 km mass start	Sprint	4 × 5 km relay	Team sprint
2006	29	9	—	DNF	5	7	Bronze
2010	33	—	—	13	9	Bronze	—

=== World Championships ===
- 8 medals – (6 gold, 1 silver, 1 bronze)

Year	Age	5 km	10 km	15 km	Pursuit	30 km	Sprint	4 × 5 km relay	Team sprint
1999	22	35	—N/a	—	—	—	—N/a	—	—N/a
2001	24	—N/a	—	—	Gold	CNX^{[a]}	—	DSQ	—N/a
2003	26	—N/a	—	—	16	—	—	—	—N/a
2005	28	—N/a	4	—N/a	—	Silver	5	5	—
2007	30	—N/a	—	—N/a	DNF	Gold	Bronze	Gold	Gold
2009	32	—N/a	4	—N/a	13	DNF	—	Gold	Gold

a. ^{1} Cancelled due to extremely cold weather.

=== World Cup ===
==== Season titles ====
- 5 titles – (2 overall, 2 distance, 1 sprint)

Season	
Season	Discipline
2007	Overall
2007	Distance
2007	Sprint
2008	Overall
2008	Distance

==== Season standings ====
Season	Age	Discipline standings					Ski Tour standings	
Season	Age	Overall	Distance	Long Distance	Middle Distance	Sprint	Tour de Ski	World Cup Final
1995	18	NC	—N/a	—N/a	—N/a	—N/a	—N/a	—N/a
1997	20	NC	—N/a	NC	—N/a	—	—N/a	—N/a
1998	21	NC	—N/a	NC	—N/a	—	—N/a	—N/a
1999	22	81	—N/a	NC	—N/a	79	—N/a	—N/a
2000	23	34	—N/a	33	28	35	—N/a	—N/a
2001	24	18	—N/a	—N/a	—N/a	NC	—N/a	—N/a
2003	26	23	—N/a	—N/a	—N/a	20	—N/a	—N/a
2004	27	6	7	—N/a	—N/a	4	—N/a	—N/a
2005	28	3	8	—N/a	—N/a	2	—N/a	—N/a
2006	29	6	7	—N/a	—N/a	10	—N/a	—N/a
2007	30	1	1	—N/a	—N/a	1	1	—N/a
2008	31	1	1	—N/a	—N/a	3	2	1
2009	32	5	6	—N/a	—N/a	11	1	DNF
2010	33	22	21	—N/a	—N/a	20	DNF	28

==== Individual podiums ====
- 27 victories – (21 WC, 6 SWC)
- 52 podiums – (44 WC, 8 SWC)

No.	Season	Date	Location	Race	Level	Place
1	2000–01	17 December 2000	Brusson, Italy	1.5 km Sprint F	World Cup	3rd
2	2000–01	10 February 2001	Otepää, Estonia	5 km C Individual	World Cup	2nd
3	2002–03	11 March 2003	Drammen, Norway	1.5 km Sprint C	World Cup	3rd
4	2003–04	13 December 2003	Davos, Switzerland	10 km C Individual	World Cup	2nd
5	2003–04	18 January 2004	Nové Město, Czech Republic	1.2 km Sprint F	World Cup	2nd
6	2003–04	26 February 2004	Drammen, Norway	1.5 km Sprint C	World Cup	2nd
7	2003–04	7 March 2004	Lahti, Finland	10 km C Individual	World Cup	1st
8	2004–05	20 November 2004	Gällivare, Sweden	10 km C Individual	World Cup	3rd
9	2004–05	14 December 2004	Asiago, Italy	1.2 km Sprint C	World Cup	2nd
10	2004–05	13 February 2005	Reit im Winkl, Germany	1.2 km Sprint C	World Cup	1st
11	2004–05	5 March 2005	Lahti, Finland	1.2 km Sprint C	World Cup	3rd
12	2004–05	9 March 2005	Drammen, Norway	1.2 km Sprint C	World Cup	1st
13	2004–05	12 March 2005	Oslo, Norway	30 km C Individual	World Cup	3rd
14	2004–05	16 March 2005	Gothenburg, Sweden	1.1 km Sprint F	World Cup	3rd
15	2005–06	19 November 2005	Beitostølen, Norway	10 km C Individual	World Cup	2nd
16	2005–06	26 November 2005	Rukatunturi, Finland	10 km C Individual	World Cup	2nd
17	2005–06	4 February 2006	Davos, Switzerland	1.0 km Sprint F	World Cup	2nd
18	2005–06	5 February 2006	Davos, Switzerland	10 km C Individual	World Cup	1st
19	2006–07	25 November 2006	Rukatunturi, Finland	1.2 km Sprint C	World Cup	2nd
20	2006–07	26 November 2006	Rukatunturi, Finland	10 km C Individual	World Cup	1st
21	2006–07	13 December 2006	Cogne, Italy	10 km C Individual	World Cup	1st
22	2006–07	16 December 2006	La Clusaz, France	15 km F Mass Start	World Cup	1st
23	2006–07	3 January 2007	Oberstdorf, Germany	10 km C Individual	Stage World Cup	3rd
24	2006–07	5 January 2007	Asiago, Italy	1.2 km Sprint F	Stage World Cup	1st
25	2006–07	6 January 2007	Cavalese, Italy	15 km C Mass Start	Stage World Cup	1st
26	2006–07	29 December 2006 – 7 January 2007	(Czech Republic) (Germany) (Italy) Tour de Ski	Overall Standings	World Cup	1st
27	2006–07	27 January 2007	Otepää, Estonia	10 km C Individual	World Cup	2nd
28	2006–07	28 January 2007	Otepää, Estonia	1.0 km Sprint C	World Cup	1st
29	2006–07	3 February 2007	Davos, Switzerland	10 km F Individual	World Cup	1st
30	2006–07	10 March 2007	Lahti, Finland	1.2 km Sprint F	World Cup	1st
31	2006–07	14 March 2007	Drammen, Norway	1.2 km Sprint C	World Cup	1st
32	2006–07	17 March 2007	Oslo, Norway	30 km C Individual	World Cup	2nd
33	2006–07	21 March 2007	Stockholm, Sweden	1.1 km Sprint C	World Cup	2nd
34	2007–08	8 December 2007	Davos, Switzerland	10 km C Individual	World Cup	1st
35	2007–08	28 December 2007	Nové Město, Czech Republic	3.3 km C Individual	Stage World Cup	1st
36	2007–08	2 January 2008	Nové Město, Czech Republic	10 km C Individual	Stage World Cup	2nd
37	2007–08	5 January 2008	Val di Fiemme, Italy	10 km C Mass Start	Stage World Cup	1st
38	2007–08	28 December 2007 – 6 January 2008	(Czech Republic) (Italy) Tour de Ski	Overall Standings	World Cup	2nd
39	2007–08	9 February 2008	Otepää, Estonia	10 km C Individual	World Cup	1st
40	2007–08	10 February 2008	Otepää, Estonia	1.2 km Sprint C	World Cup	3rd
41	2007–08	27 February 2008	Stockholm, Sweden	1.1 km Sprint C	World Cup	1st
42	2007–08	2 March 2008	Lahti, Finland	10 km C Individual	World Cup	1st
43	2007–08	5 March 2008	Drammen, Norway	1.2 km Sprint C	World Cup	1st
44	2007–08	16 March 2008	Bormio, Italy	10 km F Pursuit	World Cup	1st
45	2008–09	30 November 2008	Rukatunturi, Finland	10 km C Individual	World Cup	2nd
46	2008–09	13 December 2008	Davos, Switzerland	10 km C Individual	World Cup	1st
47	2008–09	28 December 2008	Oberhof, Germany	10 km C Pursuit	Stage World Cup	1st
48	2008–09	31 December 2008	Nové Město, Czech Republic	9 km C Individual	Stage World Cup	1st
49	2008–09	3 January 2009	Val di Fiemme, Italy	10 km C Mass Start	Stage World Cup	1st
50	2008–09	27 December 2008 – 4 January 2009	(Germany) (Czech Republic) (Italy) Tour de Ski	Overall Standings	World Cup	1st
51	2008–09	24 January 2009	Otepää, Estonia	10 km C Individual	World Cup	3rd
52	2008–09	25 January 2009	Otepää, Estonia	1.2 km Sprint C	World Cup	3rd

==== Team podiums ====
- 4 victories – (4 RL)
- 16 podiums – (13 RL, 3 TS)

No.	Season	Date	Location	Race	Level	Place	Teammate(s)
1	2000–01	25 November 2000	Beitostølen, Norway	4 × 5 km Relay C/F	World Cup	1st	Manninen / Jauho / Varis
2	2000–01	16 December 2000	Santa Caterina, Italy	4 × 3 km Relay C/F	World Cup	3rd	Manninen / Salonen / Jauho
3	2003–04	11 January 2004	Otepää, Estonia	4 × 5 km Relay C/F	World Cup	3rd	Välimaa / Saarinen / Sarasoja-Lilja
4	2004–05	21 November 2004	Gällivare, Sweden	4 × 5 km Relay C/F	World Cup	2nd	Välimaa / Saarinen / Roponen
5	2004–05	15 December 2004	Asiago, Italy	6 × 1.2 km Team Sprint C	World Cup	2nd	Saarinen
6	2004–05	20 March 2005	Falun, Sweden	4 × 5 km Relay C/F	World Cup	1st	Saarinen / Välimaa / Roponen
7	2005–06	20 November 2005	Beitostølen, Norway	4 × 5 km Relay C/F	World Cup	3rd	Saarinen / Välimaa / Roponen
8	2005–06	15 January 2006	Val di Fiemme, Italy	4 × 5 km Relay C/F	World Cup	1st	Saarinen / Roponen / Varis
9	2006–07	29 October 2006	Düsseldorf, Germany	6 × 0.8 km Team Sprint F	World Cup	3rd	Saarinen
10	2006–07	19 November 2006	Gällivare, Sweden	4 × 5 km Relay C/F	World Cup	3rd	Välimaa / Roponen / Saarinen
11	2006–07	27 March 2007	Falun, Sweden	4 × 5 km Relay C/F	World Cup	2nd	Manninen / Roponen / Saarinen
12	2007–08	28 October 2007	Düsseldorf, Germany	6 × 0.8 km Team Sprint F	World Cup	3rd	Muranen
13	2007–08	24 February 2008	Falun, Sweden	4 × 5 km Relay C/F	World Cup	2nd	Saarinen / Roponen / Sarasoja-Lilja
14	2008–09	23 November 2008	Gällivare, Sweden	4 × 5 km Relay C/F	World Cup	2nd	Muranen / Saarinen / Roponen
15	2008–09	7 December 2008	La Clusaz, France	4 × 5 km Relay C/F	World Cup	1st	Muranen / Roponen / Saarinen
16	2009–10	22 November 2009	Beitostølen, Norway	4 × 5 km Relay C/F	World Cup	3rd	Muranen / Roponen / Saarinen

==== Overall record ====
Result	Distance Races^{[a]}						Sprint	Ski tours	Individual events	Team Events		All events
Result	≤ 5 km^{[b]}	≤ 10 km^{[b]}	≤ 15 km^{[b]}	≤ 30 km^{[b]}	≥ 30 km^{[b]}	Pursuit^{[c]}	Sprint	Ski tours	Individual events	Team sprint	Relay^{[d]}	All events
1st place	1	12	2	–	–	2	8	2	27	–	2	29
2nd place	1	6	–	1	–	–	6	1	15	–	4	19
3rd place	–	3	–	1	–	–	6	–	10	2	4	16
Podiums	2	21	2	2	–	2	20	3	52	2	10	64
Top 10	5	29	8	4	–	11	39	3	99	5	16	120
Points	10	55	13	6	–	22	58	4	168	6	16	190
Others	3	1^{[e]}	3	–	–	2^{[e]}	1	1^{[f]}	11	–	–	11
Starts	13	56	16	6	–	24	59	5	179	6	16	201

a. ^{1} Classification is made according to FIS classification.
b. ^{1} ^{2} ^{3} ^{4} ^{5} Includes individual and mass start races.
c. ^{1} Includes handicap start, pursuit and double pursuit races.
d. ^{1} Incomplete due to lack of appropriate sources prior to 2001.
e. ^{1} ^{2} Did not finish the race (DNF).
f. ^{1} Withdrawn from 2009–10 Tour de Ski.

Note: Until 1999 World Championships, World Championship races are part of the World Cup. Hence results from 1999 World Championships races are included in the World Cup overall record.
