= Jiří Kittner =

Czech politician

Jiří Kittner (born 5 January 1963 in Liberec) is a Czech politician and former mayor of Liberec. He served as mayor from 1999 to 2010.

A native of Liberec, Kittner earned his degrees in automotive and electronic technology. In 1982, he became chair of the economic school in Prague. By 1991, he ran a commercial bank, then joined an economic firm in 1994. Kittner joined the local community government in Liberec in 1998 before being elected the city's mayor in 2009.

Kittner has been a major sponsor of the 2009 Nordic skiing world championships in his hometown, which was awarded to his city by the International Ski Federation in 2004.
