= Kirsi Välimaa =

Finnish cross-country skier

Personal information
- Full name: Kirsi Välimaa-Antila
- Nationality: Finland
- Born: 15 October 1978 (age 47) Jämijärvi, Finland

Sport
- Sport: Skiing
- Club: Jämin Jänne

World Cup career
- Seasons: 10 – (1999–2008)
- Indiv. starts: 76
- Indiv. podiums: 2
- Indiv. wins: 0
- Team starts: 14
- Team podiums: 8
- Team wins: 1
- Overall titles: 0 – (19th in 2003)
- Discipline titles: 0

Kirsi Välimaa-Antila (born 15 October 1978 in Jämijärvi, Satakunta) is a Finnish cross-country skier who competed from 1999 to 2008. Her lone World Cup victory was in a 4 × 5 km relay event in Sweden in 2005.

At the 2006 Winter Olympics in Turin, Välimaa-Antila finished 34th in the 7.5 km + 7.5 km double pursuit event. Her best finish at the FIS Nordic World Ski Championships was fifth in the 4 × 5 km relay at Oberstdorf in 2005.

== Cross-country skiing results ==
All results are sourced from the International Ski Federation (FIS).

=== Olympic Games ===
| Year | Age | 10 km individual | 15 km skiathlon | 30 km mass start | Sprint | 4 × 5 km relay | Team sprint |
|---|---|---|---|---|---|---|---|
| 2006 | 24 | — | 34 | — | — | — | — |

=== World Championships ===
| Year | Age | 10 km | 15 km | Pursuit | 30 km | Sprint | 4 × 5 km relay | Team sprint |
|---|---|---|---|---|---|---|---|---|
| 2003 | 24 | 10 | — | 24 | — | — | — | —N/a |
| 2005 | 26 | — | —N/a | 27 | 21 | 22 | — | 5 |

=== World Cup ===
==== Season standings ====
| Season | Age | Discipline standings | | | | | Ski Tour standings | |
| Season | Age | Overall | Distance | Long Distance | Middle Distance | Sprint | Tour de Ski | World Cup Final |
|---|---|---|---|---|---|---|---|---|
| 1999 | 20 | NC | —N/a | NC | —N/a | — | —N/a | —N/a |
| 2000 | 21 | NC | —N/a | — | NC | — | —N/a | —N/a |
| 2001 | 22 | 56 | —N/a | —N/a | —N/a | 33 | —N/a | —N/a |
| 2002 | 23 | 38 | —N/a | —N/a | —N/a | 18 | —N/a | —N/a |
| 2003 | 24 | 19 | —N/a | —N/a | —N/a | 18 | —N/a | —N/a |
| 2004 | 25 | 25 | 27 | —N/a | —N/a | 25 | —N/a | —N/a |
| 2005 | 26 | 24 | 29 | —N/a | —N/a | 13 | —N/a | —N/a |
| 2006 | 27 | 47 | 33 | —N/a | —N/a | 57 | —N/a | —N/a |
| 2007 | 28 | 86 | 76 | —N/a | —N/a | 65 | — | —N/a |
| 2008 | 29 | NC | NC | —N/a | —N/a | — | — | — |

==== Individual podiums ====
- 2 podiums

| No. | Season | Date | Location | Race | Level | Place |
|---|---|---|---|---|---|---|
| 1 | 2002–03 | 6 March 2003 | Oslo, Norway | 1.5 km Sprint C | World Cup | 3rd |
| 2 | 2004–05 | 5 March 2005 | Lahti, Finland | 1.2 km Sprint C | World Cup | 2nd |

==== Team podiums ====
- 1 victory
- 8 podiums

| No. | Season | Date | Location | Race | Level | Place | Teammates |
|---|---|---|---|---|---|---|---|
| 1 | 2000–01 | 13 January 2001 | Soldier Hollow, United States | 4 × 5 km Relay C/F | World Cup | 3rd | Rauhala / Sirviö / Saarinen |
| 2 | 2002–03 | 1 December 2012 | Kuusamo, Finland | 2 × 5 km / 2 × 10 km Relay C/F | World Cup | 2nd | Taipale / Lassila / Jauhojärvi |
| 3 | 2002–03 | 19 January 2003 | Nové Město, Czech Republic | 4 × 5 km Relay C/F | World Cup | 3rd | Saarinen / Pienimäki-Hietamäki / Varis |
| 4 | 2003–04 | 11 January 2004 | Otepää, Estonia | 4 × 5 km Relay C/F | World Cup | 3rd | Saarinen / Sarasoja / Kuitunen |
| 5 | 2004–05 | 21 November 2004 | Gällivare, Sweden | 4 × 5 km Relay C/F | World Cup | 2nd | Kuitunen / Saarinen / Roponen |
| 6 | 2004–05 | 20 March 2005 | Falun, Sweden | 4 × 5 km Relay C/F | World Cup | 1st | Saarinen / Roponen / Kuitunen |
| 7 | 2005–06 | 20 November 2005 | Beitostølen, Norway | 4 × 5 km Relay C/F | World Cup | 3rd | Saarinen / Roponen / Kuitunen |
| 8 | 2006–07 | 19 November 2006 | Gällivare, Sweden | 4 × 5 km Relay C/F | World Cup | 3rd | Kuitunen / Roponen / Saarinen |
