= Toni Roponen =

Toni Roponen (born 15 October 1973 Mikkeli, Finland) is a Finnish cross-country skiing coach and co-commentator for Finnish broadcasting company Yle. His wife is the cross-country skier, Riitta-Liisa Roponen. From 2002 to 2005, Toni Roponen was the head coach of Finland's biathlon team.
