= Aino-Kaisa Saarinen =

Finnish cross-country skier (born 1979)

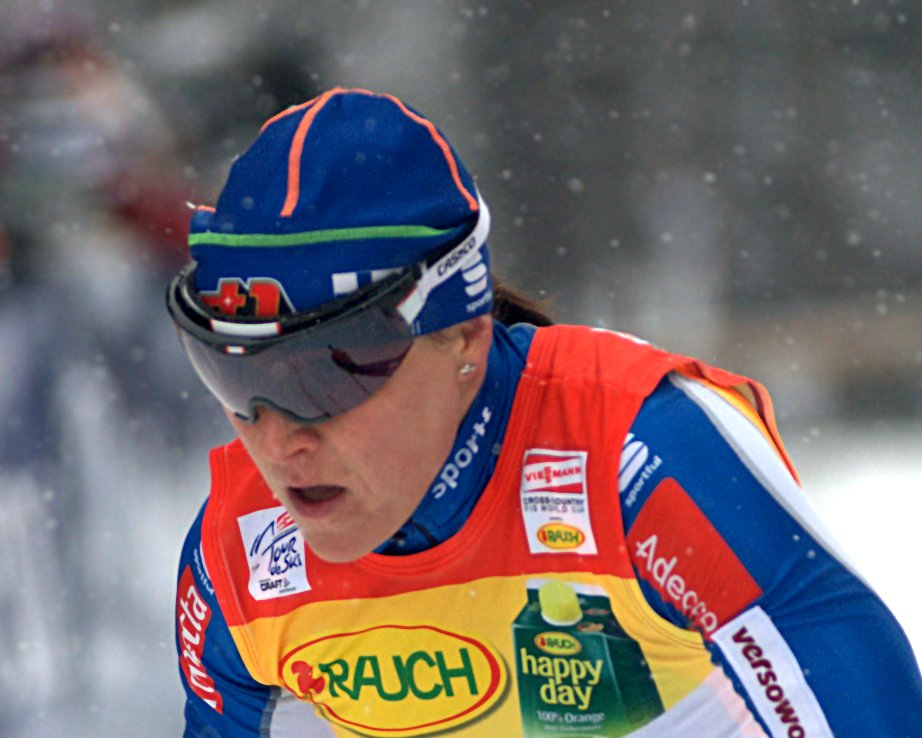

Personal information
- Nationality: Finland
- Born: 1 February 1979 (age 47) Hollola, Finland
- Height: 1.67 m (5 ft 6 in)

Sport
- Sport: Skiing
- Club: Lempäälän Kisa

World Cup career
- Seasons: 21 – (1998–2018)
- Indiv. starts: 356
- Indiv. podiums: 35
- Indiv. wins: 4
- Team starts: 48
- Team podiums: 26
- Team wins: 3
- Overall titles: 0 – (3rd in 2009)
- Discipline titles: 0
Medal record
Women's cross-country skiing
Representing Finland
Olympic Games
Silver medal – second place	2014 Sochi	4 × 5 km relay
Silver medal – second place	2014 Sochi	Team sprint
Bronze medal – third place	2006 Turin	Team sprint
Bronze medal – third place	2010 Vancouver	30 km classical
Bronze medal – third place	2010 Vancouver	4 × 5 km relay
World Championships
Gold medal – first place	2007 Sapporo	4 × 5 km relay
Gold medal – first place	2009 Liberec	10 km classical
Gold medal – first place	2009 Liberec	Team sprint
Gold medal – first place	2009 Liberec	4 × 5 km relay
Silver medal – second place	2011 Oslo	Team sprint
Bronze medal – third place	2009 Liberec	15 km pursuit
Bronze medal – third place	2011 Oslo	10 km classical
Bronze medal – third place	2011 Oslo	4 × 5 km relay
Bronze medal – third place	2015 Falun	4 × 5 km relay
Bronze medal – third place	2017 Lahti	4 × 5 km relay
U23 World Championships
Silver medal – second place	2002 Val di Fiemme	15 km freestyle
Junior World Championships
Gold medal – first place	1999 Saalfelden	4 × 5 km relay

Aino-Kaisa Saarinen (born 1 February 1979) is a retired Finnish cross-country skier who competed in the World Cup between 1998 and 2018. With 354 individual World Cup starts, Saarinen is the current record holder for both men and women, with Stefanie Böhler in second place with 343.

== Career ==
Competing in two Winter Olympics, she won three bronze medals with one in 2006 (Team sprint) and two in 2010 (30 km, 4 × 5 km relay).

Saarinen also won six medals at the FIS Nordic World Ski Championships with four golds (Team sprint: 2009, 10 km: 2009, 4 × 5 km relay: 2007, 2009) and two bronze (7.5 km + 7.5 km double pursuit: 2009, 10 km: 2011). She has six individual victories in FIS races since 2002, but did not win her first World Cup event until she won the 30 km classical event at the Holmenkollen ski festival on 17 March 2007.

Saarinen finished second in the 2008/09 Tour de Ski behind Virpi Kuitunen.

== Cross-country skiing results ==
All results are sourced from the International Ski Federation (FIS).

=== Olympic Games ===
- 5 medals – (2 silver, 3 bronze)

Year	Age	10 km individual	15 km skiathlon	30 km mass start	Sprint	4 × 5 km relay	Team sprint
2006	27	7	—	17	26	7	Bronze
2010	31	15	5	Bronze	13	Bronze	—
2014	35	4	5	21	—	Silver	Silver
2018	39	—	—	20	25	4	—

=== World Championships ===
- 10 medals – (4 gold, 1 silver, 5 bronze)

Year	Age	10 km	15 km	Pursuit	30 km	Sprint	4 × 5 km relay	Team sprint
2001	22	—	—	—	CNX^{[a]}	11	—	—N/a
2003	24	—	25	—	22	29	—	—N/a
2005	26	—	—N/a	30	4	8	5	—
2007	28	—	—N/a	6	4	18	Gold	—
2009	30	Gold	—N/a	Bronze	7	—	Gold	Gold
2011	32	Bronze	—N/a	8	23	—	Bronze	Silver
2013	34	—	—N/a	—	17	—	—	—
2015	36	—	—N/a	15	7	18	Bronze	—
2017	38	—	—N/a	—	14	—	Bronze	5

'a.' ^{1} Cancelled due to extremely cold weather.

=== World Cup ===
==== Season standings ====
Season	Age	Discipline standings					Ski Tour standings			
Season	Age	Overall	Distance	Long Distance	Middle Distance	Sprint	Nordic Opening	Tour de Ski	World Cup Final	Ski Tour Canada
1998	19	NC	—N/a	NC	—N/a	—	—N/a	—N/a	—N/a	—N/a
1999	20	NC	—N/a	NC	—N/a	—	—N/a	—N/a	—N/a	—N/a
2000	21	49	—N/a	NC	NC	31	—N/a	—N/a	—N/a	—N/a
2001	22	28	—N/a	—N/a	—N/a	15	—N/a	—N/a	—N/a	—N/a
2002	23	62	—N/a	—N/a	—N/a	53	—N/a	—N/a	—N/a	—N/a
2003	24	27	—N/a	—N/a	—N/a	33	—N/a	—N/a	—N/a	—N/a
2004	25	14	16	—N/a	—N/a	7	—N/a	—N/a	—N/a	—N/a
2005	26	8	17	—N/a	—N/a	4	—N/a	—N/a	—N/a	—N/a
2006	27	12	13	—N/a	—N/a	18	—N/a	—N/a	—N/a	—N/a
2007	28	5	3rd place, bronze medalist(s)	—N/a	—N/a	7	—N/a	4	—N/a	—N/a
2008	29	9	8	—N/a	—N/a	6	—N/a	17	11	—N/a
2009	30	3rd place, bronze medalist(s)	2nd place, silver medalist(s)	—N/a	—N/a	5	—N/a	2nd place, silver medalist(s)	16	—N/a
2010	31	4	6	—N/a	—N/a	4	—N/a	4	9	—N/a
2011	32	9	7	—N/a	—N/a	19	—	13	13	—N/a
2012	33	8	8	—N/a	—N/a	20	7	9	27	—N/a
2013	34	26	21	—N/a	—N/a	35	31	DNF	18	—N/a
2014	35	13	8	—N/a	—N/a	21	28	9	24	—N/a
2015	36	29	28	—N/a	—N/a	46	—	13	—N/a	—N/a
2016	37	NC	NC	—N/a	—N/a	NC	43	—	—N/a	—
2017	38	24	21	—N/a	—N/a	41	—	17	19	—N/a
2018	39	22	19	—N/a	—N/a	38	32	15	23	—N/a

==== Individual podiums ====
- 4 victories – (3 WC, 1 SWC)
- 35 podiums – (24 WC, 11 SWC)

No.	Season	Date	Location	Race	Level	Place
1	2002–03	8 March 2003	Oslo, Norway	30 km Individual C	World Cup	3rd
2	2004–05	16 March 2005	Gothenburg, Sweden	1.0 km Sprint F	World Cup	2nd
3	2005–06	22 October 2005	Düsseldorf, Germany	0.8 km Sprint F	World Cup	2nd
4	2006–07	13 December 2006	Cogne, Italy	10 km Individual C	World Cup	3rd
5	2006–07	6 January 2007	Cavalese, Italy	15 km Mass Start C	Stage World Cup	2nd
6	2006–07	20 January 2007	Rybinsk, Russia	15 km Mass Start F	World Cup	3rd
7	2006–07	14 March 2007	Drammen, Norway	1.0 km Sprint C	World Cup	3rd
8	2006–07	17 March 2007	Oslo, Norway	30 km Individual C	World Cup	1st
9	2007–08	8 December 2007	Davos, Switzerland	10 km Individual C	World Cup	3rd
10	2007–08	28 December 2007	Nové Město, Czech Republic	3.3 km Individual C	Stage World Cup	2nd
11	2007–08	2 January 2008	Nové Město, Czech Republic	10 km Individual C	Stage World Cup	1st
12	2007–08	9 February 2008	Otepää, Estonia	10 km Individual C	World Cup	2nd
13	2007–08	23 February 2008	Falun, Sweden	7.5 km + 7.5 km Pursuit C/F	World Cup	3rd
14	2008–09	22 November 2008	Gällivare, Sweden	10 km Individual F	World Cup	3rd
15	2008–09	30 November 2008	Rukatunturi, Finland	10 km Individual C	World Cup	1st
16	2008–09	6 December 2008	La Clusaz, France	15 km Mass Start F	World Cup	2nd
17	2008–09	13 December 2008	Davos, Switzerland	10 km Individual C	World Cup	2nd
18	2008–09	29 December 2008	Prague, Czech Republic	1.3 km Sprint F	Stage World Cup	2nd
19	2008–09	31 December 2008	Nové Město, Czech Republic	9 km Individual C	Stage World Cup	2nd
20	2008–09	1 January 2009	Nové Město, Czech Republic	1.2 km Sprint F	Stage World Cup	3rd
21	2008–09	3 January 2009	Val di Fiemme, Italy	10 km Mass Start C	Stage World Cup	3rd
22	2008–09	27 December 2008 – 4 January 2009	(Germany) (Czech Republic) (Italy) Tour de Ski	Overall Standings	World Cup	2nd
23	2008–09	24 January 2009	Otepää, Estonia	10 km Individual C	World Cup	2nd
24	2008–09	25 January 2009	Otepää, Estonia	1.2 km Sprint C	World Cup	2nd
25	2008–09	18 March 2009	Stockholm, Sweden	1.0 km Sprint C	Stage World Cup	2nd
26	2009–10	29 November 2009	Rukatunturi, Finland	10 km Individual C	World Cup	1st
27	2009–10	13 December 2009	Davos, Switzerland	1.0 km Sprint F	World Cup	3rd
28	2009–10	2 January 2010	Oberhof, Germany	10 km Pursuit C	Stage World Cup	2nd
29	2009–10	3 January 2010	Oberhof, Germany	1.6 km Sprint C	Stage World Cup	3rd
30	2009–10	7 January 2010	Cortina–Toblach, Italy	5 km Individual C	Stage World Cup	2nd
31	2009–10	16 January 2010	Otepää, Estonia	10 km Individual C	World Cup	3rd
32	2009–10	17 January 2010	Otepää, Estonia	1.2 km Sprint C	World Cup	3rd
33	2009–10	11 March 2010	Drammen, Norway	1.0 km Sprint C	World Cup	2nd
34	2010–11	4 February 2011	Rybinsk, Russia	7.5 km + 7.5 km Pursuit C/F	World Cup	3rd
35	2010–11	19 February 2011	Drammen, Norway	10 km Individual C	World Cup	3rd

==== Team podiums ====
- 3 victories – (2 RL, 1 TS)
- 26 podiums – (20 RL, 6 TS)

No.	Season	Date	Location	Race	Level	Place	Teammate(s)
1	2000–01	13 January 2001	Soldier Hollow, United States	4 × 5 km Relay C/F	World Cup	3rd	Rauhala / Välimaa / Sirviö
2	2002–03	19 January 2003	Nové Město, Czech Republic	4 × 5 km Relay C/F	World Cup	3rd	Välimaa / Pienimäki-Hietamäki / Varis
3	2003–04	11 January 2004	Otepää, Estonia	4 × 5 km Relay C/F	World Cup	3rd	Välimaa / Sarasoja / Kuitunen
4	2003–04	22 February 2004	Umeå, Sweden	4 × 5 km Relay C/F	World Cup	3rd	Salonen / Sarasoja / Venäläinen
5	2004–05	21 November 2004	Gällivare, Sweden	4 × 5 km Relay C/F	World Cup	3rd	Välimaa / Kuitunen / Roponen
6	2004–05	15 December 2004	Asiago, Italy	6 × 1.2 km Team Sprint C	World Cup	2nd	Kuitunen
7	2004–05	23 January 2005	Pragelato, Italy	6 × 1.2 km Team Sprint C	World Cup	3rd	Manninen
8	2004–05	20 March 2005	Falun, Sweden	4 × 5 km Relay C/F	World Cup	1st	Välimaa / Roponen / Kuitunen
9	2005–06	20 November 2005	Beitostølen, Norway	4 × 5 km Relay C/F	World Cup	3rd	Välimaa / Roponen / Kuitunen
10	2006–07	29 October 2006	Düsseldorf, Germany	6 × 0.8 km Team Sprint F	World Cup	3rd	Kuitunen
11	2006–07	19 November 2006	Gällivare, Sweden	4 × 5 km Relay C/F	World Cup	3rd	Välimaa / Kuitunen / Roponen
12	2006–07	4 February 2007	Davos, Switzerland	4 × 5 km Relay C/F	World Cup	3rd	Manninen / Venäläinen / Roponen
13	2006–07	25 March 2007	Falun, Sweden	4 × 5 km Relay C/F	World Cup	2nd	Kuitunen / Roponen / Muranen
14	2007–08	25 November 2007	Beitostølen, Norway	4 × 5 km Relay C/F	World Cup	3rd	Sarasoja / Roponen / Muranen
15	2007–08	17 February 2008	Liberec, Czech Republic	4 × 1.4 km Team Sprint C	World Cup	2nd	Muranen
16	2007–08	24 February 2008	Falun, Sweden	4 × 5 km Relay C/F	World Cup	2nd	Kuitunen / Roponen / Sarasoja
17	2008–09	23 November 2008	Gällivare, Sweden	4 × 5 km Relay C/F	World Cup	2nd	Muranen / Kuitunen / Roponen
18	2008–09	7 December 2008	La Clusaz, France	4 × 5 km Relay C/F	World Cup	1st	Muranen / Kuitunen / Roponen
19	2009–10	22 November 2009	Beitostølen, Norway	4 × 5 km Relay C/F	World Cup	3rd	Muranen / Kuitunen / Roponen
20	2011–12	20 November 2011	Sjusjøen, Norway	4 × 5 km Relay C/F	World Cup	3rd	Lähteenmäki / Roponen / Sarasoja-Lilja
21	2011–12	12 February 2012	Nové Město, Czech Republic	4 × 5 km Relay C/F	World Cup	2nd	Sarasoja-Lilja / Roponen / Lähteenmäki
22	2012–13	20 January 2013	La Clusaz, France	4 × 5 km Relay C/F	World Cup	2nd	Kyllönen / Roponen / Niskanen
23	2013–14	8 December 2013	Lillehammer, Norway	4 × 5 km Relay C/F	World Cup	2nd	Kyllönen / Niskanen / Lähteenmäki
24	2013–14	22 December 2013	Asiago, Italy	6 × 1.25 km Team Sprint C	World Cup	1st	Kyllönen
25	2013–14	12 January 2014	Nové Město, Czech Republic	6 × 1.3 km Team Sprint C	World Cup	2nd	Malvalehto
26	2016–17	18 December 2016	La Clusaz, France	4 × 5 km Relay C/F	World Cup	2nd	Kyllönen / Roponen / Mononen
