= Johan Kjølstad =

Norwegian cross-country skier

Personal information
- Nationality: Norway
- Born: 9 March 1983 (age 43) Levanger Municipality, Norway

Sport
- Sport: Skiing
- Club: Skogn IL

World Cup career
- Seasons: 13 – (2002–2012)
- Indiv. starts: 68
- Indiv. podiums: 7
- Indiv. wins: 3
- Team starts: 6
- Team podiums: 4
- Team wins: 2
- Overall titles: 0 – (15th in 2006)
- Discipline titles: 0
Medal record
Men's cross-country skiing
Representing Norway
World Championships
Gold medal – first place	2009 Liberec	Team sprint
Silver medal – second place	2009 Liberec	Individual sprint
Junior World Championships
Gold medal – first place	2003 Sollefteå	Individual sprint

Johan Kjølstad (born 9 March 1983) is a Norwegian cross-country skier who has competed since 2002.

Born in Levanger Municipality, he represents the sports club Skogn IL.

Competing in two Winter Olympics, he earned his best finish of seventh in the individual sprint event at Turin in 2006. He finished sixth overall in the Sprint Cup at the 2007-08 Cross-country Skiing World Cup, and won one of the races.

At the 2009 FIS Nordic World Ski Championships, Kjølstad won the sprint prologue before American Andrew Newell and Russian Alexei Petukhov. In the quarter-finals, Kjølstad progressed alongside Swiss World Cup leader Dario Cologna. Then, Kjølstad defeated Nikolay Morilov in the semi-final and went to the final heat, being a medal favourite. Here, he fought with Ola Vigen Hattestad for the gold, having broken free from the other four competitors. At the sprint final, Vigen Hattestad defeated Kjølstad who grabbed the silver medal. The following day, Kjølstad teamed up with Vigen Hattestad to win gold in the team sprint event.

== Cross-country skiing results ==
All results are sourced from the International Ski Federation (FIS).

=== Olympic Games ===
Year	Age	15 km individual	30 km skiathlon	50 km mass start	Sprint	4 × 10 km relay	Team sprint
2006	23	—	—	—	7	—	—
2010	27	—	—	—	9	—	—

=== World Championships ===
- 2 medals – (1 gold, 1 silver)

Year	Age	15 km individual	30 km skiathlon	50 km mass start	Sprint	4 × 10 km relay	Team sprint
2009	26	—	—	—	Silver	—	Gold

=== World Cup ===
==== Season standings ====
Season	Age	Discipline standings			Ski Tour standings		
Season	Age	Overall	Distance	Sprint	Nordic Opening	Tour de Ski	World Cup Final
2002	19	NC	—N/a	NC	—N/a	—N/a	—N/a
2003	20	128	—N/a	71	—N/a	—N/a	—N/a
2004	21	NC	—	NC	—N/a	—N/a	—N/a
2005	22	22	—	7	—N/a	—N/a	—N/a
2006	23	15	—	5	—N/a	—N/a	—N/a
2007	24	33	—	8	—N/a	—	—N/a
2008	25	25	NC	6	—N/a	DNF	—
2009	26	38	NC	11	—N/a	—	77
2010	27	74	—	32	—N/a	—	—
2011	28	80	—	40	—	—	—
2012	29	109	—	56	—	—	—

==== Individual podiums ====
- 3 victories – (2 WC, 1 SWC)
- 7 podiums – (6 WC, 1 SWC)

No.	Season	Date	Location	Race	Level	Place
1	2004–05	4 December 2004	Bern, Switzerland	1.35 km Sprint F	World Cup	3rd
2	2004–05	16 January 2005	Nové Město, Czech Republic	1.2 km Sprint F	World Cup	1st
3	2005–06	30 December 2005	Nové Město, Czech Republic	1.2 km Sprint F	World Cup	3rd
4	2005–06	22 January 2006	Oberstdorf, Germany	1.2 km Sprint C	World Cup	2nd
5	2007–08	1 December 2007	Rukatunturi, Finland	1.2 km Sprint C	World Cup	1st
6	2008–09	14 December 2008	Davos, Switzerland	1.7 km Sprint F	World Cup	2nd
7	2008–09	18 March 2009	Stockholm, Sweden	1.0 km Sprint C	Stage World Cup	1st

==== Team podiums ====
- 2 victories (2 TS)
- 4 podiums (4 TS)

No.	Season	Date	Location	Race	Level	Place	Teammate
1	2005–06	23 October 2005	Düsseldorf, Germany	6 × 1.5 km Team Sprint F	World Cup	1st	Iversen
2	2005–06	18 March 2006	Sapporo, Japan	6 × 1.2 km Team Sprint F	World Cup	2nd	Rønning
3	2007–08	28 October 2007	Düsseldorf, Germany	6 × 1.5 km Team Sprint F	World Cup	2nd	Hetland
4	2010–11	16 January 2011	Liberec, Czech Republic	6 × 1.6 km Team Sprint C	World Cup	1st	Hattestad
