= Kaisa Varis =

Finnish cross-country skier and biathlete (born 1975)

Personal information
- Nationality: Finland
- Born: 21 September 1975 (age 50) Ilomantsi, Finland

Sport
- Sport: Skiing
- Club: Joensuun Hiihtoveikot

World Cup career
- Seasons: 10 – (1996–2003, 2005–2006)
- Indiv. starts: 54
- Indiv. podiums: 9
- Indiv. wins: 2
- Team starts: 11
- Team podiums: 3
- Team wins: 2
- Overall titles: 0 – (8th in 2000)
- Discipline titles: 0
Medal record
Representing Finland
Women's cross-country skiing
World Championships
Bronze medal – third place	2001 Lahti	15 km classical
Disqualified	2003 Val di Fiemme	4 × 5 km relay
Disqualified	2001 Lahti	4 × 5 km relay

Kaisa Varis (born 21 September 1975, in Ilomantsi) is a Finnish retired cross-country skier and biathlete. Her career has been marred by doping convictions: as a cross-country skier, she was involved but not suspended in a doping scandal and in 2003 she was suspended two years for doping use. After her suspension, she returned as a biathlete in 2007, but in 2008 she received a lifetime ban from all International Biathlon Union (IBU) competitions after another positive doping test. However, her lifetime ban was overturned in March 2009 because the Court of Arbitration for Sport ruled that the IBU failed to adhere to correct testing procedures; she remains eligible to compete in biathlon.

== Career ==
=== Cross-country skiing ===
In cross-country skiing, Varis competed from 1995 to 2006. Her biggest success was the win of the bronze medal in the 15 km at the 2001 FIS Nordic World Ski Championships, but she is better known for her doping controversies at those championships: Varis was part of the 4 × 5 km relay that was disqualified when fellow skiers Virpi Kuitunen and Milla Jauho were disqualified for taking hydroxyethyl starch, a banned blood plasma expander. Varis was originally implicated, but later was cleared in this scandal.

Varis's best individual finish at the Winter Olympics was fourth in the 15 km at Salt Lake City in 2002. She also has ten individual career victories at various distances from 1998 to 2002.

Two years after the first doping incident, at the 2003 World Championships in Val di Fiemme, she was suspended for five days before the event's start due to a high hemoglobin count, though was allowed to compete when a second test came back five days later with a lower count. Varis attended the 30 km event, but was later disqualified for taking EPO, an endurance-enhancing drug, and served a two-year suspension as a result.

Though she qualified, she did not compete in the 2006 Winter Olympics in Torino, because she was excluded by Finland's Olympic committee.

=== Biathlon ===
Varis switched from cross-country skiing to biathlon and made her debut in the Biathlon World Cup on March 2, 2007, in Lahti, Finland, by finishing 70th in the 7.5 km sprint race. On November 30, 2007, she finished fifth in the 7.5 km sprint event in Kontiolahti. On January 11, 2008, Varis scored her first victory in a biathlon World Cup race in the 7.5 km sprint event in Ruhpolding, Germany, but it was later voided because of her positive doping test.

On January 24, 2008, it was made public that at least the A sample from a test for prohibited substances on January 6 had again tested positive for EPO. Varis denied any doping. However, on January 31, 2008, the IBU announced, that the B sample confirmed the results; due to this case, the Finnish Biathlon Association did not register Varis for the 2008 World Championships. Despite her first ban coming as a cross-country skier, she was considered a repeat offender by the IBU Executive Board and banned from the sport for life on February 11, 2008.

In March 2008 she announced her intention to appeal to overturn the ban. In March 2009, the Court of Arbitration for Sport ruled that the International Biathlon Union had violated Varis' rights under the World Anti-Doping Agency's code by refusing to allow her or a representative to be present when her backup sample was opened for testing. Because of that, her backup sample could not be used as evidence against her, and her ban was overturned.

== Cross-country skiing results ==
All results are sourced from the International Ski Federation (FIS).

=== Olympic Games ===
Year	Age	10 km	15 km	Pursuit	30 km	Sprint	4 × 5 km relay
2002	26	—	4	12	—	23	7

=== World Championships ===
- 1 medal – (1 bronze)

Year	Age	5 km	10 km	15 km	Pursuit	30 km	Sprint	4 × 5 km relay
1999	23	—	—N/a	44	—	—	—N/a	—
2001	25	—N/a	7	Bronze	6	CNX^{[a]}	—	DSQ
2003	27	—N/a	—	DNS	—	DSQ	—	DSQ

a. ^{1} Cancelled due to extremely cold weather.

=== World Cup ===
==== Season standings ====
Season	Age	Season standings				
Season	Age	Overall	Distance	Long Distance	Middle Distance	Sprint
1996	20	NC	—N/a	—N/a	—N/a	—N/a
1997	21	NC	—N/a	NC	—N/a	—
1998	22	71	—N/a	45	—N/a	—
1999	23	34	—N/a	48	—N/a	25
2000	24	8	—N/a	4	8	25
2001	25	12	—N/a	—N/a	—N/a	—
2002	26	25	—N/a	—N/a	—N/a	73
2003	27	26	—N/a	—N/a	—N/a	—
2005	29	NC	NC	—N/a	—N/a	—
2006	30	70	53	—N/a	—N/a	—

==== Individual podiums ====
- 2 victories
- 9 podiums

No.	Season	Date	Location	Race	Level	Place
1	1999–00	8 January 2000	Moscow, Russia	15 km Individual F	World Cup	1st
2	1999–00	3 March 2000	Lahti, Finland	1.2 km Sprint F	World Cup	3rd
3	1999–00	11 March 2000	Oslo, Norway	30 km Individual C	World Cup	3rd
4	1999–00	17 March 2000	Bormio, Italy	5 km Individual C	World Cup	3rd
5	1999–00	18 March 2000	Bormio, Italy	10 km Pursuit F	World Cup	3rd
6	2000–01	25 November 2000	Beitostølen, Norway	10 km Individual C	World Cup	2nd
7	2000–01	29 November 2000	Beitostølen, Norway	5 km Individual F	World Cup	1st
8	2002–03	12 January 2003	Otepää, Estonia	15 km Mass Start C	World Cup	3rd
9	2002–03	25 January 2003	Oberhof, Germany	10 km Mass Start C	World Cup	3rd

==== Team podiums ====
- 2 victories
- 3 podiums

No.	Season	Date	Location	Race	Level	Place	Teammates
1	2000–01	25 November 2000	Beitostølen, Norway	4 × 5 km Relay C/F	World Cup	1st	Manninen / Jauho / Kuitunen
2	2002–03	19 January 2003	Nové Město, Czech Republic	4 × 5 km Relay C/F	World Cup	3rd	Välimaa / Saarinen / Hietamäki-Pienimäki
3	2005–06	15 January 2005	Val di Fiemme, Italy	4 × 5 km Relay C/F	World Cup	1st	Saarinen / Kuitunen / Roponen

== See also ==
- List of sportspeople sanctioned for doping offences
