= 2008–09 FIS Cross-Country World Cup =

Cross-country skiing competition

Discipline	Men	Women
Overall	(Switzerland) Dario Cologna	(Poland) Justyna Kowalczyk
Distance	(Italy) Pietro Piller Cottrer	(Poland) Justyna Kowalczyk
Sprint	(Norway) Ola Vigen Hattestad	(Slovenia) Petra Majdič
Nations Cup	Norway	Finland
- Nations Cup Overall: Norway

Stage events
Tour de Ski	(Switzerland) Dario Cologna	(Finland) Virpi Kuitunen
World Cup Final	(Switzerland) Dario Cologna	(Poland) Justyna Kowalczyk

Competition
Locations	17 venues	17 venues
Individual	30 events	30 events
Relay/Team	4 events	4 events
Cancelled	1 event	1 event

The 2008–09 FIS Cross-Country World Cup was a multi-race tournament over the season for cross-country skiers. It was the 28th official World Cup season in cross-country skiing for men and women. The season began on 22 November 2008 with 15 km freestyle races for women in Gällivare, won by Charlotte Kalla of Sweden. The World Cup is organised by the FIS who also run world cups and championships in ski jumping, snowboarding and alpine skiing amongst others.

== Calendar ==
Both men's and women's events tend to be held at the same resorts over a 2 or 3 day period. Listed below is a list of races which equates with the points table further down this page.

The Tour de Ski is a series of events which count towards the World Cup. This starts with the meet at Oberhof and concludes at Val di Fiemme.

=== Men ===
Key: C – Classic / F – Freestyle
WC	Stage	Date	Place	Discipline	Winner	Second	Third	Yellow bib	Ref.
1	1	22 November 2008	(Sweden) Gällivare	15 km F	(Sweden) Marcus Hellner	(Italy) Pietro Piller Cottrer	(Norway) Petter Northug	(Sweden) Marcus Hellner	
2	2	29 November 2008	(Finland) Ruka	Sprint C	(Norway) Ola Vigen Hattestad	(Norway) Tor Arne Hetland	(Norway) John Kristian Dahl	(Norway) Ola Vigen Hattestad (Sweden) Marcus Hellner	
3	3	30 November 2008	(Finland) Ruka	15 km C	(Norway) Martin Johnsrud Sundby	(Czech Republic) Lukáš Bauer	(Finland) Sami Jauhojärvi	(Norway) Martin Johnsrud Sundby	
4	4	6 December 2008	(France) La Clusaz	30 km F Mass Start	(Norway) Petter Northug	(Switzerland) Dario Cologna	(Russia) Alexander Legkov	(Norway) Petter Northug	
5	5	13 December 2008	(Switzerland) Davos	15 km C	(Sweden) Johan Olsson	(Germany) Axel Teichmann	(Finland) Sami Jauhojärvi	(Sweden) Johan Olsson	
6	6	14 December 2008	(Switzerland) Davos	Sprint F	(Norway) Ola Vigen Hattestad	(Norway) Johan Kjølstad	(Italy) Renato Pasini	(Switzerland) Dario Cologna	
7	7	20 December 2008	(Germany) Düsseldorf	Sprint F	(Norway) Ola Vigen Hattestad	(Norway) Tor Arne Hetland	(Italy) Fabio Pasini	(Norway) Ola Vigen Hattestad	
	8	27 December 2008	(Germany) Oberhof	3.75 km F Prologue	(Germany) Axel Teichmann	(Switzerland) Dario Cologna	(Norway) Petter Northug	(Norway) Ola Vigen Hattestad	
	9	28 December 2008	(Germany) Oberhof	15 km C Pursuit	(Switzerland) Dario Cologna	(Germany) Axel Teichmann	(Canada) Devon Kershaw	(Switzerland) Dario Cologna	
	10	29 December 2008	(Czech Republic) Prague	Sprint F	(Norway) Tor Arne Hetland	(Russia) Vasily Rochev	(France) Jean-Marc Gaillard	(Switzerland) Dario Cologna	
	11	31 December 2008	(Czech Republic) Nové Město	15 km C	(Germany) Axel Teichmann	(Norway) Martin Johnsrud Sundby	(Kazakhstan) Nikolay Chebotko	(Switzerland) Dario Cologna	
	12	1 January 2009	(Czech Republic) Nové Město	Sprint F	(Norway) Petter Northug	(Norway) Tor Arne Hetland	(Italy) Cristian Zorzi	(Switzerland) Dario Cologna	
	13	3 January 2009	(Italy) Val di Fiemme	20 km C Mass Start	(Germany) Axel Teichmann	(Finland) Sami Jauhojärvi	(Kazakhstan) Nikolay Chebotko	(Switzerland) Dario Cologna	
	14	4 January 2009	(Italy) Val di Fiemme	10 km F Pursuit; Final Climb	(Canada) Ivan Babikov	(Germany) Tom Reichelt	(Italy) Giorgio Di Centa	(Switzerland) Dario Cologna	
8	3rd Tour de Ski Overall (27 December 2008 – 4 January 2009)				(Switzerland) Dario Cologna	(Norway) Petter Northug	(Germany) Axel Teichmann	(Switzerland) Dario Cologna	
9	15	16 January 2009	(Canada) Vancouver	Sprint C	(Sweden) Emil Jönsson	(Norway) Ola Vigen Hattestad	(Germany) Josef Wenzl	(Switzerland) Dario Cologna	
10	16	17 January 2009	(Canada) Vancouver	15 km C + 15 km F Double Pursuit	(Italy) Pietro Piller Cottrer	(France) Jean-Marc Gaillard	(Italy) Valerio Checchi	(Switzerland) Dario Cologna	
11	17	24 January 2009	(Estonia) Otepää	15 km C	(Czech Republic) Lukáš Bauer	(Sweden) Johan Olsson	(France) Vincent Vittoz	(Switzerland) Dario Cologna	
12	18	25 January 2009	(Estonia) Otepää	Sprint C	(Norway) Ola Vigen Hattestad	(Norway) Øystein Pettersen	(Norway) Børre Næss	(Switzerland) Dario Cologna	
13	19	30 January 2009	(Russia) Rybinsk	15 km F Mass Start	(Germany) Tobias Angerer	(France) Jean-Marc Gaillard	(Belarus) Sergei Dolidovich	(Switzerland) Dario Cologna	
14	20	31 January 2009	(Russia) Rybinsk	Sprint F	(Italy) Renato Pasini	(Russia) Alexey Petukhov	(Russia) Anton Gafarov	(Switzerland) Dario Cologna	
		1 February 2009	(Russia) Rybinsk	15 km C + 15 km F Double Pursuit	cancelled due to cold weather, not rescheduled				
15	21	13 February 2009	(Italy) Valdidentro	Sprint F	(Norway) Ola Vigen Hattestad	(Russia) Alexey Petukhov	(Sweden) Emil Jönsson	(Switzerland) Dario Cologna	
16	22	14 February 2009	(Italy) Valdidentro	15 km C	(Sweden) Anders Södergren	(Norway) Jens Arne Svartedal	(Sweden) Johan Olsson	(Switzerland) Dario Cologna	
FIS Nordic World Ski Championships 2009 (19 February – 1 March)
17	23	7 March 2009	(Finland) Lahti	Sprint F	(Norway) Petter Northug	(Norway) Ola Vigen Hattestad	(Russia) Nikolay Morilov	(Switzerland) Dario Cologna	
18	24	8 March 2009	(Finland) Lahti	15 km F	(Russia) Alexander Legkov	(Italy) Pietro Piller Cottrer	(Austria) Christian Hoffmann	(Switzerland) Dario Cologna	
19	25	12 March 2009	(Norway) Trondheim	Sprint C	(Norway) Ola Vigen Hattestad	(Norway) Petter Northug	(Norway) John Kristian Dahl	(Switzerland) Dario Cologna	
20	26	14 March 2009	(Norway) Trondheim	50 km C Mass Start	(Finland) Sami Jauhojärvi	(Germany) Tobias Angerer	(Canada) Alex Harvey	(Norway) Petter Northug	
	27	18 March 2009	(Sweden) Stockholm	Sprint C	(Norway) Johan Kjølstad	(Norway) John Kristian Dahl	(Norway) Eldar Rønning	(Norway) Petter Northug	
	28	20 March 2009	(Sweden) Falun	3.3 km F	(Germany) Axel Teichmann	(Switzerland) Dario Cologna	(Czech Republic) Martin Koukal	(Norway) Petter Northug	
	29	21 March 2009	(Sweden) Falun	10 km C + 10 km F Double Pursuit	(Switzerland) Dario Cologna	(Sweden) Marcus Hellner	(Germany) Tobias Angerer	(Switzerland) Dario Cologna	
	30	22 March 2009	(Sweden) Falun	15 km F Pursuit	(Russia) Sergey Shiryayev	(France) Vincent Vittoz	(Finland) Juha Lallukka	(Switzerland) Dario Cologna	
21	2008–09 World Cup Final (18–22 March 2009)				(Switzerland) Dario Cologna	(France) Vincent Vittoz	(Russia) Alexander Legkov	(Switzerland) Dario Cologna	

=== Women ===
Key: C – Classic / F – Freestyle
WC	Stage	Date	Place	Discipline	Winner	Second	Third	Yellow bib	Ref.
1	1	22 November 2008	(Sweden) Gällivare	10 km F	(Sweden) Charlotte Kalla	(Norway) Marit Bjørgen	(Finland) Aino-Kaisa Saarinen	(Sweden) Charlotte Kalla	
2	2	29 November 2008	(Finland) Ruka	Sprint C	(Slovenia) Petra Majdič	(Sweden) Lina Andersson	(Poland) Justyna Kowalczyk	(Slovenia) Petra Majdič	
3	3	30 November 2008	(Finland) Ruka	10 km C	(Finland) Aino-Kaisa Saarinen	(Finland) Virpi Kuitunen	(Norway) Marit Bjørgen	(Finland) Aino-Kaisa Saarinen	
4	4	6 December 2008	(France) La Clusaz	15 km F Mass Start	(Norway) Kristin Størmer Steira	(Finland) Aino-Kaisa Saarinen	(Norway) Therese Johaug	(Finland) Aino-Kaisa Saarinen	
5	5	13 December 2008	(Switzerland) Davos	10 km C	(Finland) Virpi Kuitunen	(Finland) Aino-Kaisa Saarinen	(Norway) Marit Bjørgen	(Finland) Aino-Kaisa Saarinen	
6	6	14 December 2008	(Switzerland) Davos	Sprint F	(Slovenia) Petra Majdič	(Norway) Celine Brun-Lie	(Norway) Marit Bjørgen	(Finland) Aino-Kaisa Saarinen	
7	7	20 December 2008	(Germany) Düsseldorf	Sprint F	(Slovenia) Petra Majdič	(Russia) Natalya Matveyeva	(Norway) Maiken Caspersen Falla	(Finland) Aino-Kaisa Saarinen	
	8	27 December 2008	(Germany) Oberhof	2.8 km F Prologue	(Germany) Claudia Nystad	(Italy) Arianna Follis	(Slovenia) Petra Majdič (Poland) Justyna Kowalczyk	(Slovenia) Petra Majdič	
	9	28 December 2008	(Germany) Oberhof	10 km C Pursuit	(Finland) Virpi Kuitunen	(Norway) Marit Bjørgen	(Poland) Justyna Kowalczyk	(Slovenia) Petra Majdič	
	10	29 December 2008	(Czech Republic) Prague	Sprint F	(Italy) Arianna Follis	(Finland) Aino-Kaisa Saarinen	(Slovenia) Petra Majdič	(Finland) Aino-Kaisa Saarinen	
	11	31 December 2008	(Czech Republic) Nové Město	9 km C	(Finland) Virpi Kuitunen	(Finland) Aino-Kaisa Saarinen	(Norway) Marit Bjørgen	(Finland) Aino-Kaisa Saarinen	
	12	1 January 2009	(Czech Republic) Nové Město	Sprint F	(Italy) Arianna Follis	(Slovenia) Petra Majdič	(Finland) Aino-Kaisa Saarinen	(Finland) Aino-Kaisa Saarinen	
	13	3 January 2009	(Italy) Val di Fiemme	10 km C Mass Start	(Finland) Virpi Kuitunen	(Slovenia) Petra Majdič	(Finland) Aino-Kaisa Saarinen	(Finland) Aino-Kaisa Saarinen	
	14	4 January 2009	(Italy) Val di Fiemme	9 km F Pursuit; Final Climb	(Norway) Therese Johaug	(Norway) Kristin Størmer Steira	(Ukraine) Valentyna Shevchenko	(Finland) Aino-Kaisa Saarinen	
8	2nd Tour de Ski Overall (27 December 2008 – 4 January 2009)				(Finland) Virpi Kuitunen	(Finland) Aino-Kaisa Saarinen	(Slovenia) Petra Majdič	(Finland) Aino-Kaisa Saarinen	
9	15	16 January 2009	(Canada) Vancouver	Sprint C	(Slovakia) Alena Procházková	(Poland) Justyna Kowalczyk	(Sweden) Anna Olsson	(Finland) Aino-Kaisa Saarinen	
10	16	17 January 2009	(Canada) Vancouver	7.5 km C + 7.5 km F Double Pursuit	(Poland) Justyna Kowalczyk	(Italy) Marianna Longa	(Italy) Arianna Follis	(Finland) Aino-Kaisa Saarinen	
11	17	24 January 2009	(Estonia) Otepää	10 km C	(Poland) Justyna Kowalczyk	(Finland) Aino-Kaisa Saarinen	(Finland) Virpi Kuitunen	(Finland) Aino-Kaisa Saarinen	
12	18	25 January 2009	(Estonia) Otepää	Sprint C	(Slovenia) Petra Majdič	(Finland) Aino-Kaisa Saarinen	(Finland) Virpi Kuitunen	(Finland) Aino-Kaisa Saarinen	
13	19	30 January 2009	(Russia) Rybinsk	10 km F Mass Start	(Italy) Marianna Longa	(Italy) Arianna Follis	(Germany) Stefanie Böhler	(Finland) Aino-Kaisa Saarinen	
14	20	31 January 2009	(Russia) Rybinsk	Sprint F	(Finland) Pirjo Muranen	(Italy) Arianna Follis	(Italy) Magda Genuin	(Finland) Aino-Kaisa Saarinen	
		1 February 2009	(Russia) Rybinsk	7.5 km C + 7.5 km F Double Pursuit	cancelled due to cold weather, not rescheduled				
15	21	13 February 2009	(Italy) Valdidentro	Sprint F	(Slovenia) Petra Majdič	(Finland) Pirjo Muranen	(Italy) Magda Genuin	(Finland) Aino-Kaisa Saarinen	
16	22	14 February 2009	(Italy) Valdidentro	10 km C	(Poland) Justyna Kowalczyk	(Italy) Marianna Longa	(Slovenia) Petra Majdič	(Finland) Aino-Kaisa Saarinen	
FIS Nordic World Ski Championships 2009 (19 February – 1 March)
17	23	7 March 2009	(Finland) Lahti	Sprint F	(Slovenia) Petra Majdič	(Italy) Arianna Follis	(Finland) Pirjo Muranen	(Slovenia) Petra Majdič	
18	24	8 March 2009	(Finland) Lahti	10 km F	(Poland) Justyna Kowalczyk	(Sweden) Charlotte Kalla	(Norway) Marthe Kristoffersen	(Slovenia) Petra Majdič	
19	25	12 March 2009	(Norway) Trondheim	Sprint C	(Slovenia) Petra Majdič	(Slovakia) Alena Procházková	(Poland) Justyna Kowalczyk	(Slovenia) Petra Majdič	
20	26	14 March 2009	(Norway) Trondheim	30 km C Mass Start	(Slovenia) Petra Majdič	(Poland) Justyna Kowalczyk	(Japan) Masako Ishida	(Slovenia) Petra Majdič	
	27	18 March 2009	(Sweden) Stockholm	Sprint C	(Slovenia) Petra Majdič	(Finland) Aino-Kaisa Saarinen	(Sweden) Anna Olsson	(Slovenia) Petra Majdič	
	28	20 March 2009	(Sweden) Falun	2.5 km F	(Germany) Claudia Nystad	(Sweden) Charlotte Kalla	(Poland) Justyna Kowalczyk	(Slovenia) Petra Majdič	
	29	21 March 2009	(Sweden) Falun	5 km C + 5 km F Double Pursuit	(Finland) Riitta-Liisa Roponen	(Norway) Therese Johaug	(Poland) Justyna Kowalczyk	(Slovenia) Petra Majdič	
	30	22 March 2009	(Sweden) Falun	10 km F Pursuit	(Norway) Kristin Størmer Steira	(Norway) Therese Johaug	(Norway) Marthe Kristoffersen	(Slovenia) Petra Majdič	
21	2008–09 World Cup Final (18–22 March 2009)				(Poland) Justyna Kowalczyk	(Norway) Therese Johaug	(Sweden) Charlotte Kalla	(Poland) Justyna Kowalczyk	

=== Men's team ===
WC	Date	Place	Discipline	Winner	Second	Third	Ref.
1	23 November 2008	(Sweden) Gällivare	4 × 10 km relay C/F	Norway I Martin Johnsrud Sundby; Eldar Rønning; Tore Ruud Hofstad; Petter Northug	Sweden I Daniel Rickardsson; Johan Olsson; Rikard Andreasson; Marcus Hellner	Germany Jens Filbrich; Tobias Angerer; Tom Reichelt; Axel Teichmann	
2	7 December 2008	(France) La Clusaz	4 × 10 km relay C/F	Norway I Tor Arne Hetland; Martin Johnsrud Sundby; Tord Asle Gjerdalen; Petter Northug	Sweden Daniel Rickardsson; Johan Olsson; Anders Södergren; Marcus Hellner	France I Jean-Marc Gaillard; Vincent Vittoz; Maurice Manificat; Emmanuel Jonnier	
3	21 December 2008	(Germany) Düsseldorf	Team Sprint F	Norway I Tor Arne Hetland; Ola Vigen Hattestad	Sweden I Björn Lind; Thobias Fredriksson	Russia I Alexey Petukhov; Nikolay Morilov	
4	18 January 2009	(Canada) Vancouver	Team Sprint F	Sweden I Robin Bryntesson; Emil Jönsson	Italy I Fabio Pasini; Renato Pasini	Canada I George Grey; Alex Harvey	

=== Women's team ===
WC	Date	Place	Discipline	Winner	Second	Third	Ref.
1	23 November 2008	(Sweden) Gällivare	4 × 5 km relay C/F	Norway I Marit Bjørgen; Therese Johaug; Kristin Størmer Steira; Marthe Kristoffersen	Finland Pirjo Muranen; Virpi Kuitunen; Aino-Kaisa Saarinen; Riitta-Liisa Roponen	Sweden I Jenny Hansson; Britta Norgren; Anna Haag; Charlotte Kalla	
2	7 December 2008	(France) La Clusaz	4 × 5 km relay C/F	Finland Pirjo Muranen; Virpi Kuitunen; Riitta-Liisa Roponen; Aino-Kaisa Saarinen	Sweden Lina Andersson; Sara Lindborg; Anna Haag; Charlotte Kalla	Norway Kristin Mürer Stemland; Therese Johaug; Betty Ann Bjerkreim Nilsen; Kristin Størmer Steira	
3	21 December 2008	(Germany) Düsseldorf	Team Sprint F	Russia I Natalya Korostelyova; Natalya Matveyeva	Norway I Celine Brun-Lie; Maiken Caspersen Falla	Germany I Claudia Nystad; Stefanie Böhler	
4	18 January 2009	(Canada) Vancouver	Team Sprint F	Italy I Magda Genuin; Arianna Follis	Germany Nicole Fessel; Stefanie Böhler	Sweden I Lina Andersson; Anna Olsson	

== World Cup points ==
The table shows the number of points won in the 2008–09 Cross-Country Skiing World Cup for men and women.

Place	1	2	3	4	5	6	7	8	9	10	11	12	13	14	15	16	17	18	19	20	21	22	23	24	25	26	27	28	29	30
Individual	100	80	60	50	45	40	36	32	29	26	24	22	20	18	16	15	14	13	12	11	10	9	8	7	6	5	4	3	2	1
Team Sprint	100	80	60	50	45	40	36	32	29	26	24	22	20	18	16	15	14	13	12	11	10	9	8	7	6	5	4	3	2	1
World Cup Final	200	160	120	100	90	80	72	64	58	52	48	44	40	36	32	30	28	26	24	22	20	18	16	14	12	10	8	6	4	2
Relay	200	160	120	100	90	80	72	64	58	52	48	44	40	36	32	30	28	26	24	22	20	18	16	14	12	10	8	6	4	2
Tour de Ski	400	320	240	200	180	160	144	128	116	104	96	88	80	72	64	60	56	52	48	44	40	36	32	28	24	20	16	12	8	4
Stage Tour de Ski	50	46	43	40	37	34	32	30	28	26	24	22	20	18	16	15	14	13	12	11	10	9	8	7	6	5	4	3	2	1
Stage World Cup Final	50	46	43	40	37	34	32	30	28	26	24	22	20	18	16	15	14	13	12	11	10	9	8	7	6	5	4	3	2	1

A skier's best results in all distance races and sprint races counts towards the overall World Cup totals.

All distance races, included individual stages in Tour de Ski and in World Cup Final (which counts as 50% of a normal race), count towards the distance standings. All sprint races, including the sprint races during the Tour de Ski and the first race of the World Cup Final (which counts as 50% of a normal race), count towards the sprint standings.

The Nations Cup ranking is calculated by adding each country's individual competitors' scores and scores from team events. Relay events count double (see World Cup final positions), with only one team counting towards the total, while in team sprint events two teams contribute towards the total, with the usual World Cup points (100 to winning team, etc.) awarded.

== Men's standings ==
=== Overall ===
Rank	Athlete	Points
1	(Switzerland) Dario Cologna	1344
2	(Norway) Petter Northug	1207
3	(Norway) Ola Vigen Hattestad	792
4	(Finland) Sami Jauhojärvi	789
5	(Italy) Pietro Piller Cottrer	774
6	(Germany) Axel Teichmann	724
7	(Italy) Giorgio Di Centa	660
8	(France) Jean-Marc Gaillard	627
9	(Czech Republic) Lukáš Bauer	612
10	(France) Vincent Vittoz	583

Rank	Athlete	Points
11	(Russia) Alexander Legkov	562
12	(Norway) Eldar Rønning	518
13	(Norway) Martin Johnsrud Sundby	508
14	(Germany) Tobias Angerer	477
15	(Sweden) Johan Olsson	462
16	(Norway) John Kristian Dahl	444
17	(Russia) Vasily Rochev	437
18	(Canada) Devon Kershaw	398
19	(Norway) Tor Arne Hetland	373
20	(Sweden) Marcus Hellner	367

Rank	Athlete	Points
21	(Italy) Renato Pasini	359
22	(Russia) Yevgeny Dementyev	354
23	(Germany) Jens Filbrich	305
24	(Russia) Alexey Petukhov	291
25	(Russia) Maxim Vylegzhanin	288
26	(Estonia) Jaak Mae	275
27	(Estonia) Andrus Veerpalu	275
28	(Sweden) Emil Jönsson	272
29	(Italy) David Hofer	265
30	(Russia) Nikolay Morilov	260

=== Distance ===
Rank	Athlete	Points
1	(Italy) Pietro Piller Cottrer	559
2	(Switzerland) Dario Cologna	539
3	(Norway) Petter Northug	489
4	(Finland) Sami Jauhojärvi	466
5	(Czech Republic) Lukáš Bauer	460
6	(Germany) Axel Teichmann	445
7	(Sweden) Johan Olsson	432
8	(Russia) Alexander Legkov	407
9	(Germany) Tobias Angerer	377
10	(France) Jean-Marc Gaillard	374

=== Sprint ===
Rank	Athlete	Points
1	(Norway) Ola Vigen Hattestad	792
2	(Italy) Renato Pasini	359
3	(Norway) Tor Arne Hetland	335
4	(Norway) John Kristian Dahl	326
5	(Norway) Petter Northug	308
6	(Russia) Alexey Petukhov	278
7	(Sweden) Emil Jönsson	272
8	(Russia) Nikolay Morilov	260
9	(Switzerland) Dario Cologna	205
10	(Russia) Nikita Kriukov	203

== Women's standings ==
=== Overall ===
Rank	Athlete	Points
1	(Poland) Justyna Kowalczyk	1810
2	(Slovenia) Petra Majdič	1730
3	(Finland) Aino-Kaisa Saarinen	1485
4	(Italy) Arianna Follis	1127
5	(Finland) Virpi Kuitunen	1124
6	(Finland) Pirjo Muranen	999
7	(Italy) Marianna Longa	991
8	(Norway) Kristin Størmer Steira	771
9	(Norway) Therese Johaug	725
10	(Norway) Marit Bjørgen	714

Rank	Athlete	Points
11	(Finland) Riitta-Liisa Roponen	710
12	(Sweden) Charlotte Kalla	623
13	(Germany) Claudia Nystad	599
14	(Sweden) Anna Olsson	509
15	(Germany) Stefanie Böhler	505
16	(Ukraine) Valentyna Shevchenko	492
17	(Germany) Evi Sachenbacher-Stehle	484
18	(Slovakia) Alena Procházková	423
19	(Sweden) Anna Haag	413
20	(Russia) Yevgeniya Medvedeva-Arbuzova	379

Rank	Athlete	Points
21	(Canada) Sara Renner	333
22	(Austria) Katerina Smutna	331
23	(Italy) Magda Genuin	329
24	(Norway) Marthe Kristoffersen	316
25	(Germany) Katrin Zeller	306
26	(Russia) Natalya Matveyeva	283
27	(Norway) Celine Brun-Lie	247
28	(Russia) Alena Sidko	240
29	(Sweden) Lina Andersson	226
30	(France) Karine Laurent Philippot	219

=== Distance ===
Rank	Athlete	Points
1	(Poland) Justyna Kowalczyk	1004
2	(Finland) Aino-Kaisa Saarinen	706
3	(Italy) Marianna Longa	662
4	(Norway) Kristin Størmer Steira	590
5	(Slovenia) Petra Majdič	551
6	(Finland) Virpi Kuitunen	525
7	(Norway) Therese Johaug	507
8	(Italy) Arianna Follis	490
9	(Norway) Marit Bjørgen	435
10	(Ukraine) Valentyna Shevchenko	418

=== Sprint ===
Rank	Athlete	Points
1	(Slovenia) Petra Majdič	875
2	(Italy) Arianna Follis	469
3	(Finland) Pirjo Muranen	461
4	(Finland) Aino-Kaisa Saarinen	407
5	(Poland) Justyna Kowalczyk	406
6	(Slovakia) Alena Procházková	353
7	(Italy) Magda Genuin	319
8	(Russia) Natalya Matveyeva	283
9	(Sweden) Anna Olsson	256
10	(Norway) Celine Brun-Lie	209

== Nations Cup ==
Rank	Nation	Points
1	Norway	9334
2	Finland	6675
3	Italy	6413
4	Russia	6197
5	Sweden	4920
6	Germany	4353
7	France	2738
8	Slovenia	2032
9	Switzerland	2028
10	Poland	1954

== Achievements ==
First World Cup Podium

- Anton Gafarov (RUS), 21, in his 2nd season – no. 3 in the WC 20 (Sprint F) in Rybinsk

Victories in this World Cup (all-time number of victories as of 2008/09 season in parentheses)

Men

- Ola Vigen Hattestad (NOR), 6 (8) first places
- Axel Teichmann (GER), 4 (12) first places
- Dario Cologna (SUI), 4 (4) first places
- Petter Northug (NOR), 3 (6) first places
- Tor Arne Hetland (NOR), 1 (13) first place
- Lukáš Bauer (CZE), 1 (11) first place
- Tobias Angerer (GER), 1 (11) first place
- Pietro Piller Cottrer (ITA), 1 (6) first places
- Anders Södergren (SWE), 1 (3) first place
- Emil Jönsson (SWE), 1 (2) first place
- Renato Pasini (ITA), 1 (2) first place
- Alexander Legkov (RUS), 1 (2) first place
- Sergey Shiryayev (RUS), 1 (2) first place
- Johan Kjølstad (NOR), 1 (2) first place
- Marcus Hellner (SWE), 1 (1) first place
- Martin Johnsrud Sundby (NOR), 1 (1) first place
- Johan Olsson (SWE), 1 (1) first place
- Ivan Babikov (CAN), 1 (1) first place
- Sami Jauhojärvi (FIN), 1 (1) first place

Women

- Petra Majdič (SLO), 9 (16) first places
- Virpi Kuitunen (FIN), 5 (27) first places
- Justyna Kowalczyk (POL), 5 (7) first places
- Arianna Follis (ITA), 2 (5) first places
- Kristin Størmer Steira (NOR), 2 (4) first places
- Claudia Künzel-Nystad (GER), 2 (4) first places
- Charlotte Kalla (SWE), 1 (5) first place
- Pirjo Muranen (FIN), 1 (5) first place
- Aino-Kaisa Saarinen (FIN), 1 (3) first place
- Riitta-Liisa Roponen (FIN), 1 (2) first place
- Therese Johaug (NOR), 1 (1) first place
- Alena Procházková (SVK), 1 (1) first place
- Marianna Longa (ITA), 1 (1) first place
