= FIS Nordic World Ski Championships 2009 =

- Official logo for the FIS Nordic World Ski Championships 2009
- Host city: Liberec, Czech Republic
- Nations: 61
- Athletes: 589
- Events: 20
- Opening: 18 February 2009
- Closing: 1 March 2009
- Main venue: Tipsport Arena
- Website: Liberec2009.com

The FIS Nordic World Ski Championships 2009 (Czech: Mistrovství světa v klasickém lyžování Liberec 2009) took place 18 February – 1 March 2009 in Liberec, Czech Republic. This was the fourth time these championships were hosted either in the Czech Republic or in Czechoslovakia, having done so at Janské Lázně (1925) and Vysoké Tatry (in both 1935 and 1970).

The biggest sports event in the country's history, it hosted 589 athletes from 61 countries. Women's ski jumping and Men's Nordic combined 10 km mass start events debuted at these championships, both won by Americans Lindsey Van and Todd Lodwick, respectively. Estonia's Andrus Veerpalu became the oldest gold medalist at 38 when he won gold in the men's 15 km event.

Norway won the most medals with twelve and most golds with five, all in the men's cross-country skiing events, including three from Petter Northug. Germany finished second in the total medal count with nine though none of them were gold (eight silver and one bronze). Finland finished third in the medal count with eight with three golds, all from Aino-Kaisa Saarinen in women's cross-country skiing.

Fourth in total medal count, but second in gold medal count was the United States with six, including four golds, who prior to these championships, had won only three medals in all of the previous championships combined, including four medals in Nordic combined (Lodwick: two golds, Bill Demong: one gold and one bronze). Kikkan Randall became the first American woman to win a medal in cross country skiing at the world championships with her silver in the individual sprint.

Besides the debut of women's ski jumping at these championships, the big winner in the jumping events was Austria with three medals and two each for Wolfgang Loitzl and Gregor Schlierenzauer. Adding the 10 km mass start, the Nordic combined format was changed from 7.5 km sprint and 15 km individual Gundersen to 10 km individual large hill (aka Large hill Gundersen) and 10 km individual normal hill (aka Normal hill Gundersen), respectively.

Despite concern over the lack of snowfall that plagued event preparation prior to the championships, the championships themselves had an abundance of snowfall and wind that caused the ski jumping part of the Nordic combined mass start to be postponed for a day and the ski jumping individual large hill competition to be limited to one jump.

Attendance was between 180,000 and 200,000, twice the number at the previous championships in Sapporo, but 35 to 40 percent lower than the 2005 championships in Oberstdorf. FIS President Gian Franco Kasper commented at the closing ceremonies of the 15 nations earning medals at these championships, along with the successes of the television coverage by Czech TV and the success of the women's ski jumping at these championships would pave the way for inclusion into the 2014 Winter Olympics. A broadcast report from the European Broadcasting Union released on 4 June 2009 had total viewership of 666 million global viewers, higher than that of the 2005 championships and the 2001 championships.

== Competition format changes ==
The initial schedule for the competition was approved at the FIS Council meeting in Portorož, Slovenia during the weekend of 25–28 May 2007. Women's ski jumping became an official event for the first time at these championships on the normal hill which took place 20 February. This was approved at the May 2006 FIS Congress in Vilamoura, Portugal. Cross country skiing events had its classical interval start events adjusted to include a 5 km qualification event for women and a 10 km qualification for men for the women's 10 km and men's 15 km event with the top 20 finishers in each qualification advancing to the main events. These events took place 18–20 February. Nordic combined had the greatest changes in it schedule with the debut of the 10 km mass start that was also approved at the 2006 Congress in Vilamoura, and the replacement of the 7.5 km sprint and 15 km individual Gundersen events with two separate 10 km individual events. The first event, replacing the 15 km Gundersen, was a single jump from the individual normal hill followed by a 10 km cross country event using the Gundersen system while the second event, replacing the 7.5 km sprint, was a single jump from the individual large hill followed by a 10 km cross country event also using the Gundersen system. The Nordic combined changes were approved at an autumn seasonal meeting in Zürich, Switzerland, the week of 29 September 2008. Other changes listed in the ski jumping part of the Nordic combined team event was only one jump and being listed was the point-time differential at 1 point equaling 1.33 seconds.

== History ==
=== 2004 – June 2007 ===
The host of the 2009 World championships was awarded at the 2004 FIS Congress in Miami, Florida, USA on 3 June 2004. The opposing candidate city to Liberec was Oslo, Norway. Norwegian Ski President Sverre Seeberg stated to the Norwegian press before the voting started that he "thought it would be a close call, but not as close for FIS President Kasper to use his deciding vote." The fact this was the fourth time in a row that Liberec applied for the championships, and that it was almost 40 years since it last was arranged in Eastern Europe (1970 in Vysoké Tatry, Czechoslovakia) might give Liberec an advantage, according to Seeberg.

Liberec was selected 11–4 over Oslo, and since there were 17 FIS members, Kasper did not vote. Seeberg was ineligible to vote, even though he served in place of the late Jan Jensen. The Oslo committee quickly announced after the loss that they would apply for the 2011 championships, which they got awarded two years later.

Prior to being awarded the World championships in 2004, Liberec had hosted a total of 40 cross country skiing, Nordic combined, and ski jumping competitions though it had not hosted a cross country World Cup event by June 2005. At a 24–25 May 2005 meeting, a report was given by the Liberec committee to the FIS race directors on course inspection, including layout of the courses. On 10 May 2006, a coordination group meeting was held led by Roman Kumpošt, the first organizing committee chair, regarding venue construction, television production, and construction within Liberec itself in preparation for the championships. A coordination meeting took place in Liberec 18–19 April 2007 to discuss venue information and event preparation.

=== July – December 2007 ===
Czech cross country skier and six-time Winter Olympic medalist Kateřina Neumannová was originally an honorary vice president of the organizing committee. On 25 July 2007, Neumannová was appointed as the new president of the organizing committee as approved by the organizing committee, replacing Kumpošt. She also served as a World Cup organizer for the second of the Tour de Ski events that took place in Prague on 30 December 2007. During the week of 13 August 2007, a delegation visited the FIS headquarters in Oberhofen, Switzerland and met with FIS President Kasper. This delegation included Liberec Mayor Jiří Kittner, Organizing Committee Secretary Marek Rejman, Czech Ski Association President Lukáš Sobotka, and its General Secretary Norbert Pelc, and all four confirmed the work toward the sites used for the championships were proceeding as planned with test events that occurred in February 2008. Financing issues for the event were also clarified. The next scheduled update occurred at the FIS Autumn Meeting in Zürich during the week of 24 September 2007. Progress was given by Organizing President Neumannová and Executive Director Marek Rejman while at Zürich, including updates on the venues (shown in the next section), and focused on the sports organization (including the technical directors); and the marketing and promotion of the test events. Liberec had also confirmed their support of the governmental financing for the university campus which served as the village for the teams in 2009.

=== 2008 ===
FIS President Kasper stated that the first test weekend of 8–9 February 2008 "went well" in terms of sports organization. Kasper also expressed concerns about the cost for accommodation for skiing officials and media for the upcoming events. A spring coordination meeting was held the week of 7 April 2008 that discussed preparations for the event. Among the participants were FIS, the EBU, and marketing partner APF, whom focused on lessons learned from the test events held in February 2008. Coordination group members were pleased in what transpired during the February 2008 test events, including an athletes' village that was constructed at the local university. Final competition schedule was confirmed by the FIS Council in its May 2008 meeting in Cape Town, followed by a final inspection on 13 October 2008. Following the final inspection that day, a six-hour press conference was held on the status of preparations. Detailed reports were given on the test events held in February 2008 and the lessons learned from them. FIS President Kasper expressed his support of the organizing committee's efforts to present the best championships ever. Neumannová stated that the cross country skiing facility at Vesec was ready while the ski jumping facility at Ještěd was ready in the fall once construction of the access road and surrounding area was complete. The main concern of Neumannová's was the weather given the problems with the test events in February and the need for snow making equipment. The Czech government gave the organizing committee an additional CZK 189 million (€ 7.3 million) in financial support. At the end of 2008, the championships were the biggest sports event in the history of the Czech Republic. On 16 December 2008, FIS Secretary General Lewis, FIS Event and Sponsor Manager Niklas Carlsson, Neumannová, and other key Organizing Committee staff met to discuss promotional activities for the event, including ceremonies, social events, and the accreditation system. That same day, an entire inspection of the team village took place at the Technical University of Liberec where the entire complex was renovated. The students at the university left at the end of January 2009 for the teams to arrive on campus in mid-February.

=== 2009 ===
As of 21 January 2009, there were a total of 600 competitors from 59 nations, both Championship records. Neumannová stated that the area had about 70 centimetres (28 in) of snow at both testing areas. She also stated that Czech representatives had tested both Ještěd and Vesec and were satisfied with both areas. Free public transportation in Liberec and tram transfers from the neighboring town of Jablonec nad Nisou were organized.

Doping programs that were successful at the previous World Championships in Sapporo continued with 78 EPO and 430 blood testing on athletes in 1–15 February period prior to the 2009 championships. 450 pre-competition blood tests were conducted with the top four finishers plus two randomly selected athletes of each event, totalling 120 for the championships. These tests were conducted by the Czech National Anti-Doping Agency with assistance of the World Anti-Doping Agency. Testing costs for the program were CHF 1.5 million.

As of 25 February, a total of 90,000 spectators had attended the championships. Prior to the championships, there was concern of the lack of snowfall during the championships. During the championships, there was continuing snowfall. On 23 February, Czech Republic Senate Parliament chair Přemysl Sobotka presented FIS President Kasper with a silver commemorative medal of the Senate for his merits in the development of world skiing. Kasper lead the FIS delegation to this ceremony that took place in Liberec with Sobotka which included FIS officials and representative of all 61 teams. Included in this delegation were Milan Jirasek, FIS Council Member and Chair of the Czech Olympic Committee, and Neumannová.

=== Media accreditation and television coverage ===
Media accreditation was available online until 17 October 2008. Television coverage was provided by Czech Television (CT), the host broadcaster. CT expected to produce over 60 hours of international coverage with a total of 54 TV cameras connected to 60 kilometres (37 mi) of cables. Over 1500 international media were onsite for the event. A total of 771 cumulative broadcast hours took place during the championship event, 70.3% shown live with the rest being tape-delayed. 17 national broadcasters televised the championships along with 69 Eurosport and Eurosport Asia-Pacific nations., resulting in a total of 666 million global viewers. The top events with the greatest naitional live audience was the men's ski jumping individual large and normal hill event from Poland's TVP1 with 5.0 and 4.4 million viewers respectively. Germany's ZDF had the 2nd highest national event ratings with 4.0 million viewers for the ski jumping men's team large hill event.

=== Mascot ===
The mascot was announced by the Organizing Committee during the week of 30 June 2008. It was a lion named Libi and it made its first appearance in the Czech Republic with Neumannová and Czech Republic prime minister Mirek Topolánek at a meeting that same week.

== Social programs ==
Among the social programs involved during the event were the opening ceremonies at the Tipsport arena. Included were musical performances from the English rock band Deep Purple, who performed at the opening ceremony 18 February, and the Slovak band Elán, who performed on 20 February. Concerts took place on the Liberec main square where medal award ceremonies occurred. In addition, there were special themed days, including Italian Day, Czech Day, Norwegian Day and Slovak Day. One recurring theme of this was free beer for people from these countries in some pubs at happy hour. The most famous fans at the championships were the Norwegians, who were very numerous compared with the other countries.

== World Cup discipline leaders prior to the World championships ==
As of 15 February 2009, the top three World Cup positions were as follows:

Men	Leader	Second	Third
Nordic combined	Anssi Koivuranta (FIN)	Magnus Moan (NOR)	Björn Kircheisen (GER)
Ski jumping	Gregor Schlierenzauer (AUT)	Simon Ammann (SUI)	Wolfgang Loitzl (AUT)
Cross-Country, Overall	Dario Cologna (SUI)	Petter Northug (NOR)	Axel Teichmann (GER)
Cross-Country, Distance	Axel Teichmann (GER)	Dario Cologna (SUI)	Pietro Piller Cottrer (ITA)
Cross-Country, Sprint	Ola Vigen Hattestad (NOR)	Tor Arne Hetland (NOR)	Renato Pasini (ITA)
Women	Leader	Second	Third
Cross-Country, Overall	Aino-Kaisa Saarinen (FIN)	Petra Majdič (SLO)	Justyna Kowalczyk (POL)
Cross-Country, Distance	Justyna Kowalczyk (POL)	Aino-Kaisa Saarinen (FIN)	Marianna Longa (ITA)
Cross-Country, Sprint	Petra Majdič (SLO)	Pirjo Muranen (FIN)	Arianna Follis (ITA)

Cross-country skiing's Tour de Ski winners were Finland's Virpi Kuitunen for the women and Cologna for the men; both got 400 World Cup points for their respective TdS victories. Loitzl won Ski jumping's Four Hills Tournament.

== Participants ==
589 athletes from 61 countries were entered to compete for the championships. These include 239 men and 155 women from 60 countries in cross country skiing, 77 athletes from 18 countries in Nordic combined, and 79 athletes from 22 countries in ski jumping. Additionally, 39 women from 13 countries competed in the premiere world championship ski jumping event. FIS President Kaspar hoped that the women's ski jumping event did well enough for inclusion in the 2014 Winter Olympics in Sochi, Russia.

== Venues ==
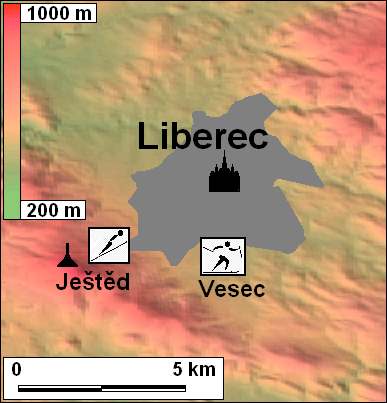
Location of venues within city of Liberec

At a coordination group meeting on 18–19 April 2007 in Liberec, the event and facility preparations were discussed. A review was also done for what could have done better from the previous World Championships in Sapporo earlier that year. According to FIS Secretary General Lewis, she was pleased about the construction progress of both Ještěd (ski jumping) and Vesec (cross country skiing) and both venues were used as test events for the upcoming World Cup season. Organizing Committee chair Kumpošt stated that both venues would be completed by fall 2007 in order to ensure FIS certification. Also in attendance was the EBU and the organizing committee for the 2011 Championships in Oslo. Snowfall that started on 17 November 2008 made it possible to produce man-made snow for the event, according to Vesec cross country skiing venue manager Robert Heczko. In ideal conditions, fourteen days of snow production were required to create the needed 60,000 cubic metres (2,100,000 cu ft) of snow to ensure coverage of all competition courses at Vesec. Over 20 snow cannons were used in the snow-making process when temperatures dip below freezing according to Heczko.

=== Cross country skiing ===
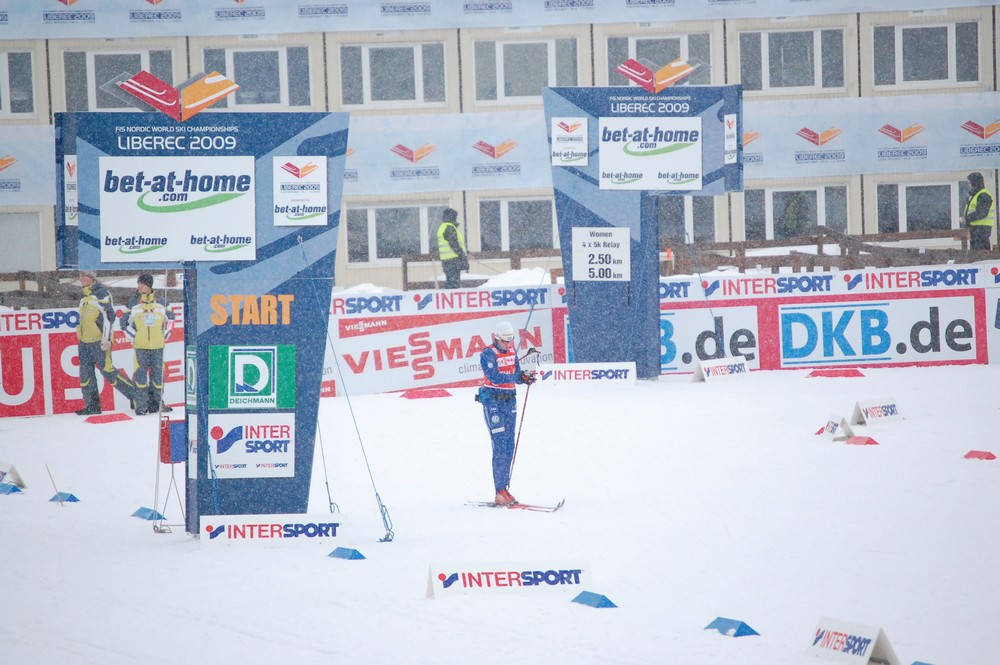
Unidentified skier during the women's 4 × 5 km relay event at the championships on 26 February 2009.

The cross country skiing venue took place at Vesec which had two 3.75 km loops in 2007. These loops were shortened to 3.3 km and 2.5 km, and then combined. Four additional loops of 1.2 km (women's sprint), 1.3 km (men's sprint), 5 km, and 7.5 km were also created. At the fall 2007 meeting in Zürich during the week of 24 September 2007, it was announced that Vesec had completed paving the courses for roller skiing and in-line skating, finalization of bridges, access roads, and permanent facilities; and installing snow-making equipment. The test event for cross country occurred during the weekend of 15–17 February 2008. Because of warm weather and the lack of snow, the organizing committee was forced to bring snow from the mountains surrounding Liberec. As a result, the races were held on the paved roller skiing track. Initially on 16 February they were scheduled to be pursuit events, but were changed to interval start events. The winner of the 10 km women's event was Norway's Astrid Jacobsen while the winner of the 15 km men's event was Jean Marc Gaillard of France. Team sprint winners on the 17th were both from Norway with the ladies going to Marit Bjørgen and Astrid Jacobsen and the men going to Martin Johnsrud Sundby and Simen Østensen Snow was lacking at the cross-country course as of 16 December 2008, but organizers were ready for expected cold temperatures from Christmas 2008 onward to prepare the courses for the championships. As of 14 January 2009, about 50,000 cubic metres (1,800,000 cu ft) of snow had been produced using between 20 and 27 snow guns and two snow lances. Tracks were groomed, widen, and maintained in preparation of the Slavic Cup (Czech Republic, Poland, and Slovakia) events that took place the weekend of 17–18 January 2009. Courses were covered with snow of 50 centimetres (20 in) as of 11 February 2009. Snow reserves guaranteed the best conditions even if warm weather hit the Jizera Mountains. Closing ceremonies of the championships were held at Vesec.

=== Ski jumping ===
The ski jumping venue took place at Ještěd which has two hills that were already to FIS specifications. The normal hill size (HS) was 100 m (HS100) while the large hill size was 134 m (HS134). Both hills were used for FIS ski jumping World Cup venues with Finnish ski jumper Janne Ahonen holding the record jump of 139 m on the HS134 hill in 2004. Modifications were done to the outrun and data was gathered on the wind flow within the ski jumping area from January to March for 2006 to 2009. At the fall 2007 meeting in Zürich during the week of 24 September 2007, it was announced by the Organizing Committee that construction was proceeding according to schedule, with completion in mid-December 2007. The test event for Jested took place on 8–9 February 2008. A grandstand of 10,000 spectators was constructed in order to have night time ski jumping the weekend of 9–10 February 2008. The hill suffered a landslide caused by continuous rainfall around the hill during the week of 28 January 2008, but the outrun was not affected by the event, according to Liberec mayor Jiri Kittner. On 1 February, Neumannová stated that the ski jumping events took place as scheduled. The lift to the ski jump that was not working during the FIS World Cup B Nordic combined event in January was fixed. The winners of the ski jumping test event at the HS134 hill were Thomas Morgenstern of Austria on 8 February and Anders Jacobsen of Norway on 9 February. An Alpen Cup competition took place on the weekend of 20–21 December 2008 to have final test procedures and infrastructure for the championships. As of 14 January 2009, the main grandstand was complete while the teams worked on proper shaping of the hills for use. The large hill was closed while the normal hill was designated for ski jumper and Nordic combined athlete training. Further construction during the week of 19 January 2009 included spectator stairs on the side of the hill, mobile containers for the athletes and their service teams; and a spectator catering tent was set up.

=== Nordic combined ===
The Nordic combined events used both venues listed for cross country skiing and ski jumping. The test event for Nordic combined occurred during the weekend of 15–17 February 2008. Because of the lack of snow and warm weather prior to the test event, the schedule for the test event was adjusted to the sprint event on 15 February, the Gundersen event on 16 February, and the sprint qualification event on 17 February. The sprint event on 15 February was cancelled to changing winds. Meanwhile, the Gundersen event on 16 February was changed to a mass start event won by Norway's Petter Tande. Two unsuccessful attempts at the ski jumping part of the sprint qualification event to high winds on the 17th resulted in the event's cancellation. A World Cup event leading up to the championships was to have taken place 13–14 December 2008 in the 10 km individual large hill event as a test event, but was cancelled on 6 December 2008 to warm weather and lack of snow. Neumannová stated that they had a second plan in getting snow from the Jizerske mountains higher elevations where there were better conditions for snowing. 10,000 cubic metres (350,000 cu ft) of snow at Bedřichov and Albrechtice v Jizerských horách were prepared for two nights. The third plan proposed two large parking places in the Giant Mountains with natural snow collected for use in the Vesec area. Neumannová assured everyone "that the entire team is working very hard in order to deliver a successful FIS Nordic World Ski Championships." and could not wait to "welcome all the teams, the international media, our guest, and of course, thousands of fans to Liberec in February."

=== Tipsport arena ===
The Tipsport Arena in Liberec was used as the operational centre for the championships. This included accreditation for the athletes, location of the organizing committee support staff, an international media centre, and individual race offices. It also served as the site for the opening ceremonies of the championships.

== Cross-country skiing ==
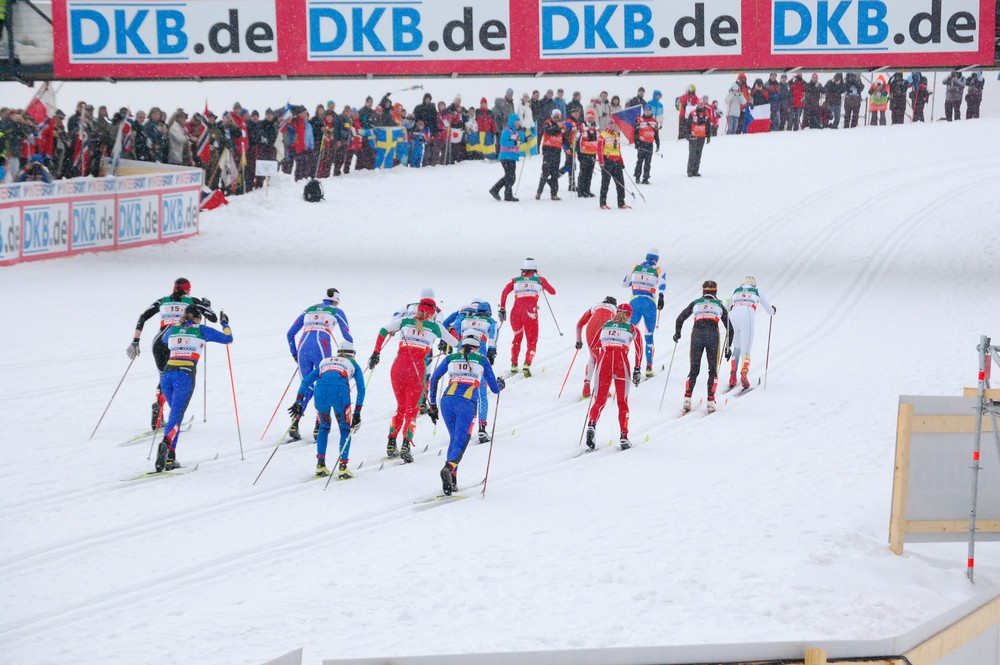
Early part of the first leg of the women's 4 × 5 km relay

The main winner in the cross country events was Norway with seven medals, including five golds, all in the men's events. Petter Northug of Norway won three golds, earning them in the 15 km + 15 km double pursuit, 50 km, and 4 x 10 km relay. His teammate, Ola Vigen Hattestad, won golds in the individual and team sprint events. Estonia's Andrus Veerpalu became the oldest winner at 38 in the men's 15 km event. Kristin Størmer Steira was Norway's only medal in the women's events with a silver in the 7.5 km + 7.5 km double pursuit event. For the women's events, the biggest winner was Finland's Aino-Kaisa Saarinen with four medals, including three golds (Team sprint, 10 km, and 4 x 5 km relay) and one bronze (7.5 km + 7.5 km double pursuit). Poland's Justyna Kowalczyk won three medals at the championships with two golds (7.5 km + 7.5 km double pursuit and 30 km) and a bronze (10 km). The only gold not awarded to either Kowalczyk or Saarinen was the women's individual sprint won by Italy's Arianna Follis. In that same event, Kikkan Randall became the first American woman to medal in cross country skiing at the world championships with her silver.

Medal table – men's cross country skiing

Event	Date	Gold	Silver	Bronze
15 km classical interval start	20 February	Andrus Veerpalu (EST)	Lukáš Bauer (CZE)	Matti Heikkinen (FIN)
15 km + 15 km double pursuit	22 February	Petter Northug (NOR)	Anders Södergren (SWE)	Giorgio Di Centa (ITA)
50 km freestyle mass start	1 March	Petter Northug (NOR)	Maxim Vylegzhanin (RUS)	Tobias Angerer (GER)
4 × 10 km relay	27 February	Eldar Rønning; Odd-Bjørn Hjelmeset; Tore Ruud Hofstad; Petter Northug; Norway	Jens Filbrich; Tobias Angerer; Franz Göring; Axel Teichmann; Germany	Matti Heikkinen; Sami Jauhojärvi; Teemu Kattilakoski; Ville Nousiainen; Finland
Individual sprint freestyle	24 February	Ola Vigen Hattestad (NOR)	Johan Kjølstad (NOR)	Nikolay Morilov (RUS)
Team sprint classical	25 February	Johan Kjølstad; Ola Vigen Hattestad; Norway	Tobias Angerer; Axel Teichmann; Germany	Ville Nousiainen; Sami Jauhojärvi; Finland

Medal table – women's cross country skiing

Event	Date	Gold	Silver	Bronze
10 km classical interval start	19 February	Aino-Kaisa Saarinen (FIN)	Marianna Longa (ITA)	Justyna Kowalczyk (POL)
7.5 km + 7.5 km double pursuit	21 February	Justyna Kowalczyk (POL)	Kristin Størmer Steira (NOR)	Aino-Kaisa Saarinen (FIN)
30 km freestyle mass start	28 February	Justyna Kowalczyk (POL)	Yevgeniya Medvedeva (RUS)	Valentina Shevchenko (UKR)
4 × 5 km relay	26 February	Pirjo Muranen; Virpi Kuitunen; Riitta-Liisa Roponen; Aino-Kaisa Saarinen; Finland	Katrin Zeller; Evi Sachenbacher-Stehle; Miriam Gössner; Claudia Künzel-Nystad; Germany	Lina Andersson; Britta Norgren; Anna Haag; Charlotte Kalla; Sweden
Individual sprint freestyle	24 February	Arianna Follis (ITA)	Kikkan Randall (USA)	Pirjo Muranen (FIN)
Team sprint classical	25 February	Aino-Kaisa Saarinen; Virpi Kuitunen; Finland	Anna Olsson; Lina Andersson; Sweden	Marianna Longa; Arianna Follis; Italy

== Men's Nordic combined ==
The United States was the big winner at these championships with four medals. Todd Lodwick and Bill Demong each won two medals with two golds for Lodwick (10 km individual normal hill, 10 km mass start), and a gold (10 km individual large hill) and a bronze (10 km individual normal hill) for Demong. Demong's disqualification in the ski jumping part of the 4 × 5 team event led to the United States withdrawal from the cross country part of the event. This led to a surprise gold medal for the Japanese in the team event, their first at the world championships in this event since 1995.

Medal table

Event	Date	Gold	Silver	Bronze
10 km individual normal hill	22 February	Todd Lodwick (USA)	Jan Schmid (NOR)	Bill Demong (USA)
10 km individual large hill	28 February	Bill Demong (USA)	Björn Kircheisen (GER)	Jason Lamy Chappuis (FRA)
10 km mass start	20 February	Todd Lodwick (USA)	Tino Edelmann (GER)	Jason Lamy Chappuis (FRA)
4 x 5 km freestyle team	26 February	Yūsuke Minato; Taihei Kato; Akito Watabe; Norihito Kobayashi; Japan	Ronny Ackermann; Eric Frenzel; Björn Kircheisen; Tino Edelmann; Germany	Mikko Kokslien; Petter Tande; Jan Schmid; Magnus Moan; Norway

== Ski jumping ==
Women's ski jumping debuted at these championships which was won by American Lindsay Van. She was also the first North American to medal in ski jumping and the first American woman to medal at the championships. On the men's side, Austria was the big winner with three medals and two each for Wolfgang Loitzl (golds in men's individual normal hill and team large hill events) and Gregor Schlierenzauer (gold in team large hill and silver in individual normal hill events). Both Loitzl and Schlierenzauer, World Cup leaders prior to the championships, joined Switzerland's Simon Ammann in the podium of the individual normal hill event. Ammann's teammate Andreas Küttel won gold in the individual large hill event in which only one jump was performed to unstable weather conditions. Norway also won three medals in the championships with a silver in the team large hill and bronzes from Anders Jacobsen (individual large hill) and Anette Sagen (women's individual normal hill).

Medal table – men's ski jumping

Event	Date	Gold	Silver	Bronze
Individual normal (HS100) hill	21 February	Wolfgang Loitzl (AUT)	Gregor Schlierenzauer (AUT)	Simon Ammann (SUI)
Individual large (HS134) hill	27 February	Andreas Küttel (SUI)	Martin Schmitt (GER)	Anders Jacobsen (NOR)
Team large (HS134) hill	28 February	Wolfgang Loitzl; Martin Koch; Thomas Morgenstern; Gregor Schlierenzauer; Austria	Anders Bardal; Tom Hilde; Johan Remen Evensen; Anders Jacobsen; Norway	Shohhei Tochimoto; Takanobu Okabe; Daiki Ito; Noriaki Kasai; Japan

Medal table – women's ski jumping

Event	Date	Gold	Silver	Bronze
Individual normal (HS100) hill	20 February	Lindsey Van (USA)	Ulrike Grässler (GER)	Anette Sagen (NOR)

== Closing ceremonies ==
At the closing ceremonies of the championships, FIS President Kasper expressed great satisfaction with the championships, stating that it was the first time that a nation without any successful national favorites (The Czech won only one medal, a silver by Bauer in the men's 15 km) had organized such a successful championship. According to Kasper, attendance reached between 180,000 and 200,000 in the 12 days of competition. The lack of snowfall concerns prior to the championships were more than made up for with continuous snowfall though that affected spectators and competitors alike. Praise was given by Kasper both to the venue managers and Czech TV for their efforts in their successful championships. 15 different nations reached the podium at the championships noted Kasper. Kasper also state the success of the women's ski jumping event will hopefully push the International Olympic Committee to include the event for the 2014 Games in Sochi with a possible team event as well. Concerning the Nordic combined 10 km mass start, Kasper stated that the event will be thoroughly analyzed as part of an overall season assessment as part of the discipline's current overhaul. Finally, Kasper wished everyone the best and looked forward to seeing everyone at Oslo for the next Nordic World Ski Championships.

== Post-event information ==
The organizing committee for the 2009 championships met in Oslo with the organizing committee of the 2011 championships on 20 April 2009 to discuss lessons learned. In the presentation was a comprehensive and frank analysis of the critical areas of Liberec's organization. Key success factors were detailed and lessons learned were elaborated, including several recommendations to both the 2011 championships and the organizing committee for the 2013 championships in Val di Fiemme, Italy. Besides the 2009, 2011, and 2013 organizing committees in attendance, other attendees included the Norwegian Ski Federation, the European Broadcasting Union television, FIS, and the APF marketing partners.

Of the 73 skiers who won medals at these championships, 34 of them would medal at the Winter Olympics in Vancouver the following year. Three of the skiers who won the world championships in their respective events, Bill Demong in the Nordic combined 10 km individual large hill, Justyna Kowalczyk in the cross-country skiing women's 30 km, and Petter Northug in the cross-country skiing men's 50 km, would win Olympic gold in those same events.

== Medal table ==
=== Top nations ===
Medal winners by nation.

* Host nation (Czech Republic)

Rank	Nation	Gold	Silver	Bronze	Total
1	Norway (NOR)	5	4	3	12
2	United States (USA)	4	1	1	6
3	Finland (FIN)	3	0	5	8
4	Austria (AUT)	2	1	0	3
5	Poland (POL)	2	0	1	3
6	Italy (ITA)	1	1	2	4
7	Japan (JPN)	1	0	1	2
7	Switzerland (SUI)	1	0	1	2
9	Estonia (EST)	1	0	0	1
10	Germany (GER)	0	8	1	9
11	Russia (RUS)	0	2	1	3
11	Sweden (SWE)	0	2	1	3
13	Czech Republic (CZE)*	0	1	0	1
14	France (FRA)	0	0	2	2
15	Ukraine (UKR)	0	0	1	1
Totals (15 entries)		20	20	20	60

=== Top athletes ===
All athletes with two or more medals.

Rank	Athlete	Gold	Silver	Bronze	Total
1	Aino-Kaisa Saarinen (FIN)	3	0	1	4
2	Petter Northug (NOR)	3	0	0	3
3	Justyna Kowalczyk (POL)	2	0	1	3
4	Ola Vigen Hattestad (NOR)	2	0	0	2
4	Todd Lodwick (USA)	2	0	0	2
4	Virpi Kuitunen (FIN)	2	0	0	2
4	Wolfgang Loitzl (AUT)	2	0	0	2
8	Gregor Schlierenzauer (AUT)	1	1	0	2
8	Johan Kjølstad (NOR)	1	1	0	2
10	Arianna Follis (ITA)	1	0	1	2
10	Bill Demong (USA)	1	0	1	2
10	Pirjo Muranen (FIN)	1	0	1	2
13	Riitta-Liisa Roponen (FIN)	1	0	0	1
14	Tobias Angerer (GER)	0	2	1	3
15	Axel Teichmann (GER)	0	2	0	2
15	Björn Kircheisen (GER)	0	2	0	2
15	Tino Edelmann (GER)	0	2	0	2
18	Anders Jacobsen (NOR)	0	1	1	2
18	Jan Schmid (NOR)	0	1	1	2
18	Lina Andersson (SWE)	0	1	1	2
18	Marianna Longa (ITA)	0	1	1	2
22	Jason Lamy-Chappuis (FRA)	0	0	2	2
22	Matti Heikkinen (FIN)	0	0	2	2
22	Sami Jauhojärvi (FIN)	0	0	2	2
22	Ville Nousiainen (FIN)	0	0	2	2
