= Riitta-Liisa Roponen =

Finnish cross-country skier

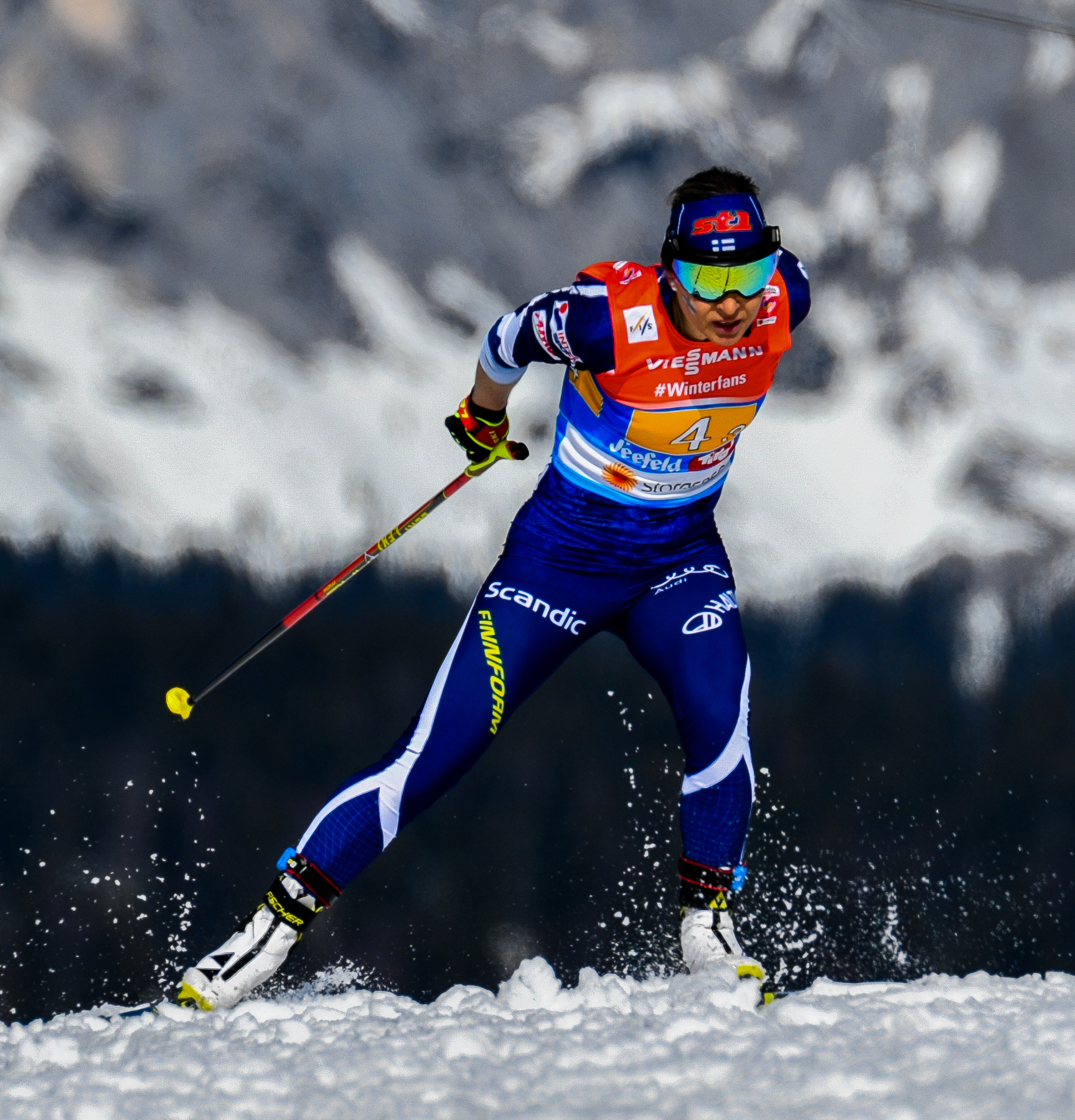
- Roponen in 2019

Personal information
- Nationality: Finland
- Born: 6 May 1978 (age 48) Haukipudas, Finland

Sport
- Sport: Skiing
- Club: Visa Ski Team Kemi

World Cup career
- Seasons: 22 – (1999–2000, 2002–2003, 2005–2019, 2021–2022, 2024)
- Indiv. starts: 239
- Indiv. podiums: 8
- Indiv. wins: 2
- Team starts: 40
- Team podiums: 22
- Team wins: 3
- Overall titles: 0 – (6th in 2007)
- Discipline titles: 0
Medal record
Women's cross-country skiing
Representing Finland
Olympic Games
Bronze medal – third place	2010 Vancouver	4 × 5 km relay
World Championships
Gold medal – first place	2007 Sapporo	Team sprint
Gold medal – first place	2007 Sapporo	4 × 5 km relay
Gold medal – first place	2009 Liberec	4 × 5 km relay
Silver medal – second place	2005 Oberstdorf	Team sprint
Bronze medal – third place	2011 Oslo	4 × 5 km relay
Bronze medal – third place	2015 Falun	4 × 5 km relay
Bronze medal – third place	2021 Oberstdorf	4 × 5 km relay
- Updated on 02 December 2023

Riitta-Liisa Roponen (née Lassila, born 6 May 1978) is a Finnish cross-country skier who has competed since 1998.

== Career ==
She won a bronze in the 4 × 5 km relay at the 2010 Winter Olympics in Vancouver.

Roponen also won two team sprint medals at the FIS Nordic World Ski Championships with a gold in 2007 (with Virpi Kuitunen) and a silver in 2005 (with Pirjo Manninen). Roponen also earned two more gold medals in the 4 × 5 km relay, earning them in 2007 and 2009.

Roponen's best individual finish at the Winter Olympics is sixth in the 10 km freestyle at Vancouver in 2010. She has three individual victories since 2006.

== Cross-country skiing results ==
All results are sourced from the International Ski Federation (FIS).

=== Olympic Games ===
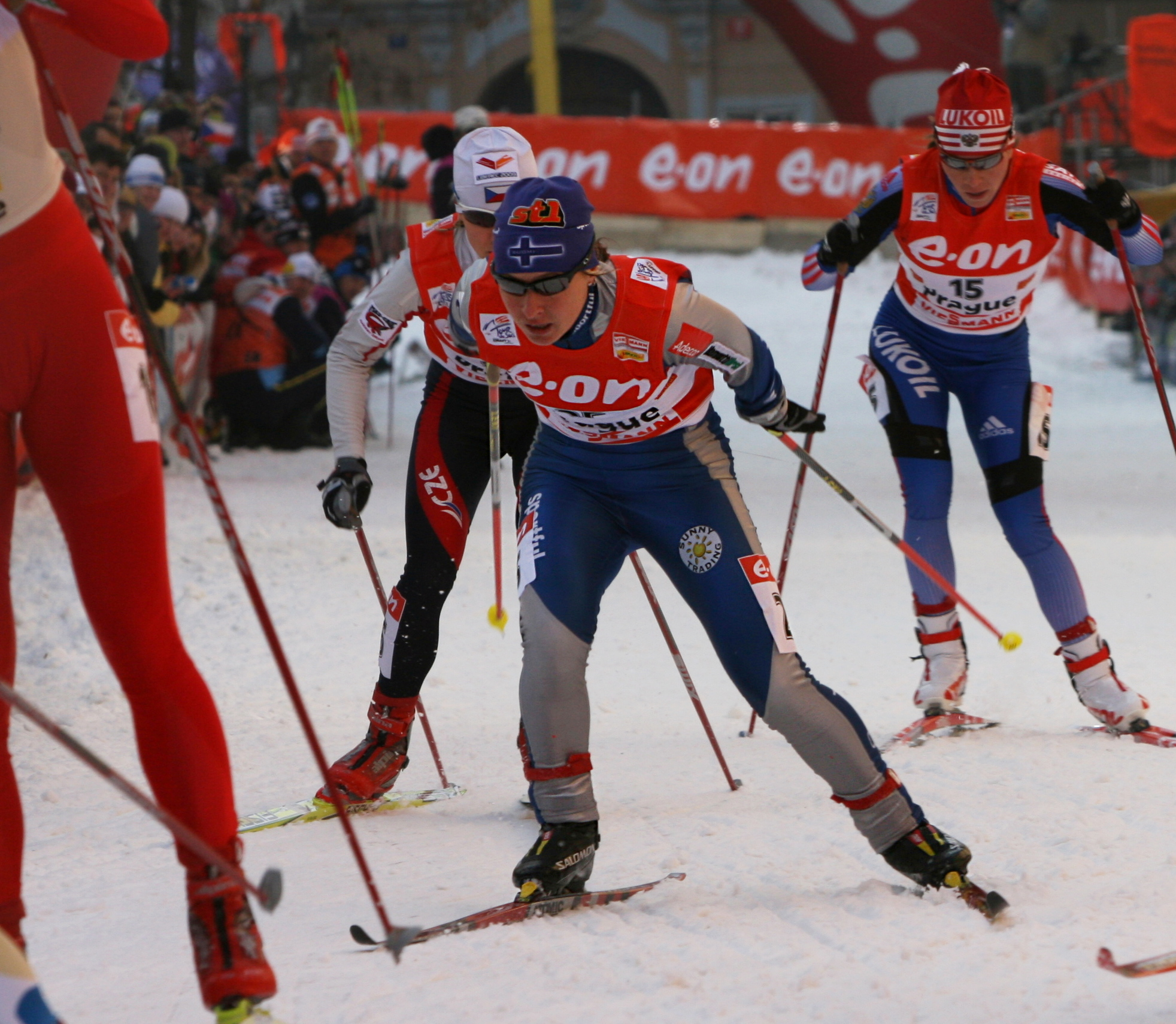
Riitta-Liisa Roponen at Tour de Ski in 2007.

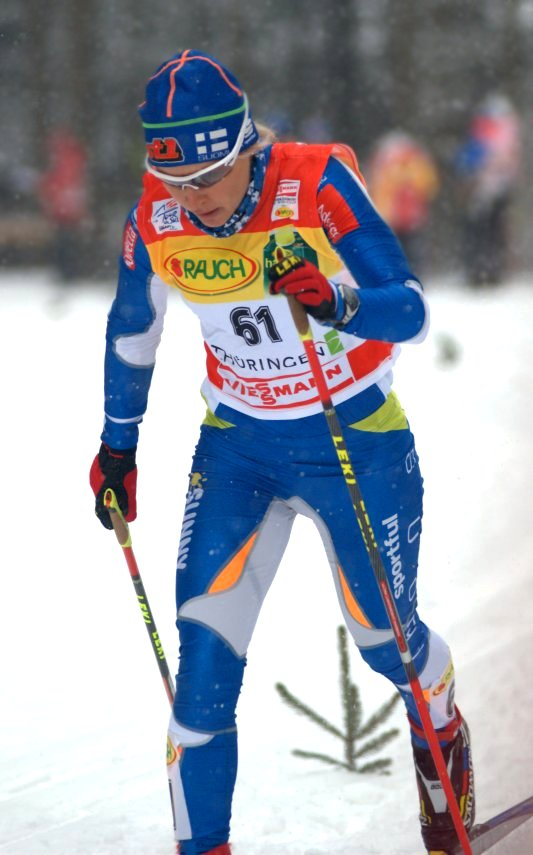
Riitta-Liisa Roponen at Tour de Ski in 2010.

- 1 medal – (1 bronze)

Year	Age	10 km individual	15 km mass start	Pursuit	30 km	Sprint	4 × 5 km relay	Team sprint
2002	23	—	19	—	—	36	7	—N/a
2006	27	35	—N/a	13	23	—	7	—
2010	31	6	—N/a	15	—	—	Bronze	8
2014	35	—	—N/a	—	26	—	—	—
2018	39	20	—N/a	—	—	—	4	—

=== World Championships ===
- 7 medals – (3 gold, 1 silver, 3 bronze)

Year	Age	10 km individual	15 km classical	Pursuit	30 km	Sprint	4 × 5 km relay	Team sprint
2003	24	—	—	41	35	—	—	—N/a
2005	26	12	—N/a	8	—	—	5	Silver
2007	28	7	—N/a	5	—	—	Gold	Gold
2009	30	—	—N/a	23	6	14	Gold	—
2011	32	18	—N/a	14	15	—	Bronze	—
2013	34	8	—N/a	16	—	—	5	—
2015	36	19	—N/a	8	18	—	Bronze	—
2019	40	—	—N/a	—	22	—	6	—
2021	42	10	—N/a	—	—	—	Bronze	—

=== World Cup ===
==== Season standings ====
Season	Age	Discipline standings					Ski Tour standings			
Season	Age	Overall	Distance	Long Distance	Middle Distance	Sprint	Nordic Opening	Tour de Ski	World Cup Final	Ski Tour Canada
1999	20	NC	—N/a	NC	—N/a	—	—N/a	—N/a	—N/a	—N/a
2000	21	NC	—N/a	—	NC	NC	—N/a	—N/a	—N/a	—N/a
2002	23	35	—N/a	—N/a	—N/a	NC	—N/a	—N/a	—N/a	—N/a
2003	24	55	—N/a	—N/a	—N/a	—	—N/a	—N/a	—N/a	—N/a
2005	26	16	14	—N/a	—N/a	45	—N/a	—N/a	—N/a	—N/a
2006	27	37	28	—N/a	—N/a	45	—N/a	—N/a	—N/a	—N/a
2007	28	6	6	—N/a	—N/a	20	—N/a	13	—N/a	—N/a
2008	29	13	11	—N/a	—N/a	20	—N/a	10	10	—N/a
2009	30	11	11	—N/a	—N/a	18	—N/a	11	10	—N/a
2010	31	7	5	—N/a	—N/a	40	—N/a	6	5	—N/a
2011	32	14	9	—N/a	—N/a	50	13	11	—	—N/a
2012	33	15	12	—N/a	—N/a	55	17	11	11	—N/a
2013	34	18	16	—N/a	—N/a	68	21	8	—	—N/a
2014	35	33	20	—N/a	—N/a	NC	41	16	—	—N/a
2015	36	41	21	—N/a	—N/a	NC	39	—	—N/a	—N/a
2016	37	31	25	—N/a	—N/a	NC	20	—	—N/a	—
2017	38	57	34	—N/a	—N/a	—	—	—	—	—N/a
2018	39	61	41	—N/a	—N/a	NC	36	—	—	—N/a
2019	40	66	46	—N/a	—N/a	—	—	—	—	—N/a
2021	42	77	50	—N/a	—N/a	NC	39	—	—N/a	—N/a
2022	43	96	65	—N/a	—N/a	NC	—N/a	DNF	—N/a	—N/a
2024	45	135	108	—N/a	—N/a	—N/a	—N/a	—N/a	—N/a	—N/a

==== Individual podiums ====
- 2 victories – (1 WC, 1 SWC)
- 8 podiums – (6 WC, 2 SWC)

No.	Season	Date	Location	Race	Level	Place
1	2006–07	16 December 2006	La Clusaz, France	15 km Mass Start F	World Cup	2nd
2	2006–07	20 January 2007	Rybinsk, Russia	15 km Mass Start F	World Cup	1st
3	2006–07	10 March 2007	Lahti, Finland	1.2 km Sprint F	World Cup	2nd
4	2007–08	15 December 2007	Rybinsk, Russia	15 km Mass Start F	World Cup	3rd
5	2007–08	14 March 2008	Bormio, Italy	2.5 km Individual F	World Cup	3rd
6	2008–09	21 March 2009	Falun, Sweden	5 km + 5 km Pursuit C/F	Stage World Cup	1st
7	2009–10	10 January 2010	Val di Fiemme, Italy	9 km Pursuit F	Stage World Cup	2nd
8	2014–15	10 January 2015	Rybinsk, Russia	7.5 km + 7.5 km Skiathlon C/F	World Cup	3rd

==== Team podiums ====
- 3 victories – (3 RL)
- 22 podiums – (20 RL, 2 TS)

No.	Season	Date	Location	Race	Level	Place	Teammate(s)
1	2001–02	13 January 2002	Nové Město, Czech Republic	4 × 1.5 km Team Sprint F	World Cup	3rd	Sirviö
2	2002–03	1 December 2002	Rukatunturi, Finland	2 × 5 km / 2 × 10 km Relay C/F	World Cup	2nd	Välimaa / Taipale / Jauhojärvi
3	2004–05	21 November 2004	Gällivare, Sweden	4 × 5 km Relay C/F	World Cup	2nd	Välimaa / Kuitunen / Saarinen
4	2004–05	20 March 2005	Falun, Sweden	4 × 5 km Relay C/F	World Cup	1st	Saarinen / Välimaa / Kuitunen
5	2005–06	20 November 2005	Beitostølen, Norway	4 × 5 km Relay C/F	World Cup	3rd	Saarinen / Välimaa / Kuitunen
6	2005–06	15 January 2006	Lago Di Tesero, Italy	4 × 5 km Relay C/F	World Cup	1st	Saarinen / Kuitunen / Varis
7	2005–06	18 March 2006	Sapporo, Japan	6 × 0.8 km Team Sprint F	World Cup	2nd	Manninen
7	2006–07	19 November 2006	Gällivare, Sweden	4 × 5 km Relay C/F	World Cup	3rd	Välimaa / Kuitunen / Saarinen
8	2006–07	4 February 2007	Davos, Switzerland	4 × 5 km Relay C/F	World Cup	3rd	Manninen / Saarinen / Venäläinen
9	2006–07	25 March 2007	Falun, Sweden	4 × 5 km Relay C/F	World Cup	2nd	Kuitunen / Muranen / Saarinen
10	2007–08	25 November 2007	Beitostølen, Norway	4 × 5 km Relay C/F	World Cup	3rd	Sarasoja / Saarinen / Muranen
11	2007–08	24 February 2008	Falun, Sweden	4 × 5 km Relay C/F	World Cup	2nd	Kuitunen / Saarinen / Sarasoja
12	2008–09	23 November 2008	Gällivare, Sweden	4 × 5 km Relay C/F	World Cup	2nd	Muranen / Kuitunen / Saarinen
13	2008–09	7 December 2008	La Clusaz, France	4 × 5 km Relay C/F	World Cup	1st	Muranen / Kuitunen / Saarinen
14	2009–10	22 November 2009	Beitostølen, Norway	4 × 5 km Relay C/F	World Cup	3rd	Muranen / Kuitunen / Saarinen
15	2011–12	20 November 2011	Sjusjøen, Norway	4 × 5 km Relay C/F	World Cup	3rd	Lähteenmäki / Saarinen / Sarasoja-Lilja
16	2011–12	12 February 2012	Nové Město, Czech Republic	4 × 5 km Relay C/F	World Cup	2nd	Sarasoja-Lilja / Saarinen / Lähteenmäki
17	2012–13	20 January 2013	La Clusaz, France	4 × 5 km Relay C/F	World Cup	2nd	Kyllönen / Saarinen / Niskanen
19	2015–16	24 January 2016	Nové Město, Czech Republic	4 × 5 km Relay C/F	World Cup	3rd	Kyllönen / Pärmäkoski / Niskanen
20	2016–17	18 December 2016	La Clusaz, France	4 × 5 km Relay C/F	World Cup	2nd	Saarinen / Kyllönen / Mononen
21	2018–19	9 December 2018	Beitostølen, Norway	4 × 5 km Relay C/F	World Cup	3rd	Matintalo / Pärmäkoski / Piippo
22	2018–19	27 January 2019	Ulricehamn, Sweden	4 × 5 km Relay C/F	World Cup	3rd	Mononen / Pärmäkoski / Piippo
