= 2008–09 Tour de Ski =

Cross-country skiing event

Tour de Ski
2008–09 FIS Cross-Country World Cup

Ski tour details
- Venue(s): Oberhof, Germany; Prague, Czech Republic; Nové Město, Czech Republic; Val di Fiemme, Italy
- Dates: 27 December 2008 – 4 January 2009
- Stages: 7

Results
Men
| Jersey awarded to the men's overall winner | Winner | Dario Cologna (SUI) |
| | Second | Petter Northug (NOR) |
| | Third | Axel Teichmann (GER) |
| Jersey awarded to the men's sprint classification winner | Sprint | Tor Arne Hetland (NOR) |
Women
| Jersey awarded to the women's overall winner | Winner | Virpi Kuitunen (FIN) |
| | Second | Aino-Kaisa Saarinen (FIN) |
| | Third | Petra Majdič (SLO) |
| Jersey awarded to the women's sprint classification winner | Sprint | Petra Majdič (SLO) |

The 2008–09 Tour de Ski was the third edition of the Tour de Ski and took place from 27 December 2008 until 4 January 2009. The race kicked off in Oberhof, Germany, and concluded with the Final Climb stage in Val di Fiemme, Italy. The tour was the first tour starting in Oberhof and the second starting in Germany. The men's event was 102 km, won by Dario Cologna of Switzerland; and the women's event was 60 km, won by Virpi Kuitunen of Finland.

== Overall leadership ==
Overall leadership by stage
| Stage | Men | | | Ladies | | |
| Stage | Winner | Overall standings | Sprint standings | Winner | Overall standings | Sprint standings |
|---|---|---|---|---|---|---|
| 1 | Axel Teichmann | Axel Teichmann | Axel Teichmann | Claudia Nystad | Claudia Nystad | Claudia Nystad |
| 2 | Dario Cologna | Dario Cologna | Axel Teichmann | Virpi Kuitunen | Virpi Kuitunen | Claudia Nystad |
| 3 | Tor Arne Hetland | Dario Cologna | Tor Arne Hetland | Arianna Follis | Arianna Follis | Arianna Follis |
| 4 | Axel Teichmann | Dario Cologna | Tor Arne Hetland | Virpi Kuitunen | Virpi Kuitunen | Arianna Follis |
| 5 | Petter Northug | Dario Cologna | Tor Arne Hetland | Arianna Follis | Aino-Kaisa Saarinen | Arianna Follis |
| 6 | Axel Teichmann | Dario Cologna | Tor Arne Hetland | Virpi Kuitunen | Virpi Kuitunen | Petra Majdič |
| 7 | Ivan Babikov | Dario Cologna | Tor Arne Hetland | Therese Johaug | Virpi Kuitunen | Petra Majdič |
| Final | | Dario Cologna | Tor Arne Hetland | Final | Virpi Kuitunen | Petra Majdič |

== Final standings ==
Legend
| Denotes the winner of the Overall standings | Denotes the winner of the Sprint standings |

=== Overall standings ===
==== Men ====
Final overall standings (1–10)
| Rank | Name | Time |
|---|---|---|
| 1 | Dario Cologna (SUI) | 2:56:05.4 |
| 2 | Petter Northug (NOR) | +59.0 |
| 3 | Axel Teichmann (GER) | +1:02.8 |
| 4 | Giorgio Di Centa (ITA) | +1:22.2 |
| 5 | Vasily Rochev (RUS) | +1:31.0 |
| 6 | Jean-Marc Gaillard (FRA) | +1:39.1 |
| 7 | Pietro Piller Cottrer (ITA) | +1:52.7 |
| 8 | Martin Johnsrud Sundby (NOR) | +2:06.3 |
| 9 | Sami Jauhojärvi (FIN) | +2:16.4 |
| 10 | Lukáš Bauer (CZE) | +2:20.8 |

Final overall standings (11–54)
| Rank | Name | Time |
|---|---|---|
| 11 | Jaak Mae (EST) | +2:21.6 |
| 12 | Jens Filbrich (GER) | +2:41.5 |
| 13 | Eldar Rønning (NOR) | +2:47.7 |
| 14 | Toni Livers (SUI) | +2:49.3 |
| 15 | Maxim Vylegzhanin (RUS) | +3:05.2 |
| 16 | Aivar Rehemaa (EST) | +3:07.2 |
| 17 | Vincent Vittoz (FRA) | +3:11.0 |
| 18 | Nikolay Chebotko (KAZ) | +3:40.8 |
| 19 | Andrus Veerpalu (EST) | +3:45.2 |
| 20 | Devon Kershaw (CAN) | +3:55.3 |
| 21 | John Kristian Dahl (NOR) | +4:14.4 |
| 22 | Tord Asle Gjerdalen (NOR) | +4:20.7 |
| 23 | Daniel Rickardsson (SWE) | +4:26.7 |
| 24 | David Hofer (ITA) | +4:33.7 |
| 25 | Emmanuel Jonnier (FRA) | +4:37.9 |
| 26 | Matti Heikkinen (FIN) | +4:40.7 |
| 27 | Roland Clara (ITA) | +4:52.4 |
| 28 | Tom Reichelt (GER) | +4:59.5 |
| 29 | Curdin Perl (SUI) | +5:16.1 |
| 30 | Alexandre Rousselet (FRA) | +5:18.9 |
| 31 | Nikolay Pankratov (RUS) | +5:24.9 |
| 32 | Valerio Checchi (ITA) | +5:28.5 |
| 33 | Alexander Legkov (RUS) | +5:37.4 |
| 34 | Fabio Pasini (ITA) | +6:29.8 |
| 35 | Ivan Babikov (CAN) | +7:05.1 |
| 36 | Jiří Magál (CZE) | +7:30.5 |
| 37 | Alexander Kuznetsov (RUS) | +7:45.1 |
| 38 | Yevgeniy Velichko (KAZ) | +7:51.3 |
| 39 | Ivan Bátory (SVK) | +7:53.6 |
| 40 | Aleš Razým (CZE) | +8:20.9 |
| 41 | Algo Kärp (EST) | +8:42.4 |
| 42 | Tor Arne Hetland (NOR) | +9:40.1 |
| 43 | Aleksandr Ossipov (KAZ) | +10:07.1 |
| 44 | Roman Leybyuk (UKR) | +10:18.4 |
| 45 | Cyril Miranda (FRA) | +11:45.8 |
| 46 | Janusz Krężelok (POL) | +11:57.8 |
| 47 | Andrey Gridin (KAZ) | +13:30.6 |
| 48 | Cristian Zorzi (ITA) | +14:15.9 |
| 49 | Damien Ambrosetti (FRA) | +22:08.8 |
| 50 | Roddy Darragon (FRA) | +22:37.8 |
| 51 | Martin Stockinger (AUT) | +23:05.0 |
| 52 | François Soulié (AND) | +23:23.5 |
| 53 | Jonas Thor Olsen (DEN) | +23:51.6 |
| 54 | Harald Wurm (AUT) | +28:34.1 |

==== Women ====
Final overall standings (1–10)
| Rank | Name | Time |
|---|---|---|
| 1 | Virpi Kuitunen (FIN) | 2:06:41.4 |
| 2 | Aino-Kaisa Saarinen (FIN) | +7.2 |
| 3 | Petra Majdič (SLO) | +34.5 |
| 4 | Justyna Kowalczyk (POL) | +1:21.1 |
| 5 | Marianna Longa (ITA) | +1:36.5 |
| 6 | Therese Johaug (NOR) | +2:20.0 |
| 7 | Anna Haag (SWE) | +2:26.5 |
| 8 | Arianna Follis (ITA) | +2:35.6 |
| 9 | Kristin Størmer Steira (NOR) | +2:51.8 |
| 10 | Marit Bjørgen (NOR) | +3:12.4 |

Final overall standings (11–36)
| Rank | Name | Time |
|---|---|---|
| 11 | Riitta-Liisa Roponen (FIN) | +3:24.6 |
| 12 | Pirjo Muranen (FIN) | +3:42.3 |
| 13 | Stefanie Böhler (GER) | +4:05.5 |
| 14 | Valentyna Shevchenko (UKR) | +4:06.6 |
| 15 | Sara Renner (CAN) | +4:51.7 |
| 16 | Claudia Nystad (GER) | +5:06.5 |
| 17 | Katrin Zeller (GER) | +5:23.3 |
| 18 | Yevgeniya Medvedeva (RUS) | +5:27.6 |
| 19 | Olga Rocheva (RUS) | +6:31.4 |
| 20 | Larisa Kurkina (RUS) | +6:37.2 |
| 21 | Olga Zavyalova (RUS) | +6:58.6 |
| 22 | Kamila Rajdlová (CZE) | +7:18.3 |
| 23 | Kateřina Smutná (AUT) | +7:45.9 |
| 24 | Sara Lindborg (SWE) | +8:17.7 |
| 25 | Olga Tiagai (RUS) | +8:30.5 |
| 26 | Alena Procházková (SVK) | +9:01.1 |
| 27 | Svetlana Malahova-Shishkina (KAZ) | +9:04.1 |
| 28 | Antonella Confortola Wyatt (ITA) | +9:35.8 |
| 29 | Magda Genuin (ITA) | +9:54.9 |
| 30 | Natalya Ilyina (RUS) | +10:17.0 |
| 31 | Yuliya Ivanova (RUS) | +10:50.0 |
| 32 | Karin Moroder (ITA) | +11:43.7 |
| 33 | Vesna Fabjan (SLO) | +12:27.6 |
| 34 | Oxana Yatskaya (KAZ) | +13:17.2 |
| 35 | Lada Nesterenko (UKR) | +13:25.0 |
| 36 | Tatjana Mannima (EST) | +13:28.3 |

- Yevgeny Dementyev finished 9th but was later disqualified after he tested positive for recombinant erythropoietin (EPO).

=== Sprint standings ===
The sprint competition was contested during the sprint races and partly during the other races. According to the position in the race, the skiers achieved bonus seconds for sprints, and bonus points for intermediate points in mass start races.

==== Men ====
Final sprint standings (1–10)
| Rank | Name | Total |
|---|---|---|
| 1 | Tor Arne Hetland (NOR) | 131 |
| 2 | Dario Cologna (SUI) | 122 |
| 3 | Petter Northug (NOR) | 105 |
| 4 | John Kristian Dahl (NOR) | 102 |
| 5 | Vasily Rochev (RUS) | 101 |
| 6 | Eldar Rønning (NOR) | 88 |
| 7 | Cristian Zorzi (ITA) | 86 |
| 8 | Jean-Marc Gaillard (FRA) | 74 |
| 9 | Axel Teichmann (GER) | 73 |
| 10 | Sami Jauhojärvi (FIN) | 70 |

==== Women ====
Final sprint standings (1–10)
| Rank | Name | Total |
|---|---|---|
| 1 | Petra Majdič (SLO) | 148 |
| 2 | Arianna Follis (ITA) | 130 |
| 3 | Aino-Kaisa Saarinen (FIN) | 123 |
| 4 | Virpi Kuitunen (FIN) | 92 |
| 5 | Marit Bjørgen (NOR) | 74 |
| 6 | Marthe Kristoffersen (NOR) | 74 |
| 7 | Marianna Longa (ITA) | 72 |
| 8 | Vesna Fabjan (SLO) | 72 |
| 9 | Riitta-Liisa Roponen (FIN) | 70 |
| 10 | Claudia Nystad (GER) | 67 |

== Stages ==
=== Stage 1 ===
27 December 2008, Oberhof - Prologue, Individual start

Men - 3.75 km Free
| Place | Name | Time |
|---|---|---|
| 1 | (Germany) Axel Teichmann | 7:11,8 min |
| 2 | (Switzerland) Dario Cologna | + 8,2 s |
| 3 | (Norway) Petter Northug | + 13,0 s |
| 4 | (Estonia) Aivar Rehemaa | + 13,3 s |
| 5 | (Canada) Devon Kershaw | + 13,8 s |
| 6 | (Germany) Tom Reichelt | + 14,9 s |

Women - 2.8 km Free
| Place | Name | Time |
|---|---|---|
| 1 | (Germany) Claudia Nystad | 6:17,2 min |
| 2 | (Italy) Arianna Follis | + 1,1 s |
| 3 | (Poland) Justyna Kowalczyk | + 2,3 s |
| 3 | (Slovenia) Petra Majdič | + 2,3 s |
| 5 | (Norway) Marit Bjørgen | + 7,6 s |
| 6 | (Finland) Pirjo Muranen | + 8,1 s |

=== Stage 2 ===
27 December 2008, Oberhof - Handicap Start

Women - 10 km Classic
| Place | Name | Time |
|---|---|---|
| 1 | (Finland) Virpi Kuitunen | 30:22,7 min |
| 2 | (Norway) Marit Bjørgen | + 1,9 s |
| 3 | (Poland) Justyna Kowalczyk | + 6,2 s |
| 4 | (Italy) Arianna Follis | + 8,9 s |
| 5 | (Finland) Aino-Kaisa Saarinen | + 10,4 s |
| 6 | (Slovenia) Petra Majdič | + 29,4 s |

Men - 15 km Classic
| Place | Name | Time |
|---|---|---|
| 1 | (Switzerland) Dario Cologna | 43:05,1 min |
| 2 | (Germany) Axel Teichmann | + 4,8 s |
| 3 | (Canada) Devon Kershaw | + 26,4 s |
| 4 | (Finland) Sami Jauhojärvi | + 26,4 s |
| 5 | (Germany) Tobias Angerer | + 28,3 s |
| 6 | (Estonia) Jaak Mae | + 28,4 s |

Women - Pursuit Time ("Winner of the Day")
| Place | Name | Time |
|---|---|---|
| 1 | (Finland) Virpi Kuitunen | 23:56,7 min |
| 2 | (Norway) Marit Bjørgen | + 3,9 s |
| 3 | (Finland) Aino-Kaisa Saarinen | + 10,4 s |
| 4 | (Poland) Justyna Kowalczyk | + 18,2 s |
| 5 | (Italy) Arianna Follis | + 26,9 s |

Men - Pursuit Time ("Winner of the Day")
| Place | Name | Time |
|---|---|---|
| 1 | (Norway) Martin Johnsrud Sundby | 35:47,9 min |
| 2 | (Estonia) Andrus Veerpalu | + 2,9 s |
| 3 | (Switzerland) Toni Livers | + 3,5 s |
| 4 | (Sweden) Daniel Rickardsson | + 4,4 s |
| 5 | (Finland) Sami Jauhojärvi | + 6,6 s |

=== Stage 3 ===
29 December 2008, Prague - Sprint

Men - 1.3 km Free
| Place | Name | Time |
|---|---|---|
| 1 | (Norway) Tor Arne Hetland | 2:34,3 min + 60 bonus seconds |
| 2 | (Russia) Vasily Rochev | 2:33,8 min + 56 bonus seconds |
| 3 | (France) Jean-Marc Gaillard | 2:38,0 min + 52 bonus seconds |
| 4 | (Finland) Sami Jauhojärvi | 2:39,0 min + 48 bonus seconds |
| 5 | (Norway) John Kristian Dahl | 2:36,2 min + 44 bonus seconds |
| 6 | (Norway) Eldar Rønning | 2:36,2 min + 42 bonus seconds |

Women - 1.3 km Free
| Place | Name | Time |
|---|---|---|
| 1 | (Italy) Arianna Follis | 2:52,3 min + 60 bonus seconds |
| 2 | (Finland) Aino-Kaisa Saarinen | 2:54,8 min + 56 bonus seconds |
| 3 | (Slovenia) Petra Majdič | 2:58,3 min + 52 bonus seconds |
| 4 | (Finland) Pirjo Muranen | 2:56,8 min + 48 bonus seconds |
| 5 | (Norway) Marthe Kristoffersen | 2:54,9 min + 44 bonus seconds |
| 6 | (Germany) Claudia Nystad | 2:54,9 min + 42 bonus seconds |

=== Stage 4 ===
31 December 2008, Nové Město na Moravě - Individual start

Men - 15 km Classic
| Place | Name | Time |
|---|---|---|
| 1 | (Germany) Axel Teichmann | 39:03,7 min |
| 2 | (Norway) Martin Johnsrud Sundby | + 5,0 s |
| 3 | (Kazakhstan) Nikolay Chebotko | + 10,5 s |
| 4 | (Estonia) Jaak Mae | +11,3 s |
| 5 | (Czech Republic) Lukáš Bauer | + 13,4 s |
| 6 | (Norway) Eldar Rønning | + 14,7 s |

Women - 9 km Classic
| Place | Name | Time |
|---|---|---|
| 1 | (Finland) Virpi Kuitunen | 24:45,4 min |
| 2 | (Finland) Aino-Kaisa Saarinen | + 37,6 s |
| 3 | (Norway) Marit Bjørgen | + 49,9 s |
| 4 | (Poland) Justyna Kowalczyk | + 55,1 s |
| 5 | (Slovenia) Petra Majdič | + 59,5 s |
| 6 | (Italy) Marianna Longa | + 1:15,0 s |

=== Stage 5 ===
1 January 2009, Nové Město na Moravě - Sprint

Men - 1.2 km Free
| Place | Name | Time |
|---|---|---|
| 1 | (Norway) Petter Northug | 60 bonus seconds |
| 2 | (Norway) Tor Arne Hetland | 56 bonus seconds |
| 3 | (Italy) Cristian Zorzi | 52 bonus seconds |
| 4 | (Norway) John Kristian Dahl | 48 bonus seconds |
| 5 | (Switzerland) Dario Cologna | 44 bonus seconds |
| 6 | (Kazakhstan) Nikolay Chebotko | 42 bonus seconds |

Women - 1.2 km Free
| Place | Name | Time |
|---|---|---|
| 1 | (Italy) Arianna Follis | 60 bonus seconds |
| 2 | (Slovenia) Petra Majdič | 56 bonus seconds |
| 3 | (Finland) Aino-Kaisa Saarinen | 52 bonus seconds |
| 4 | (Italy) Magda Genuin | 48 bonus seconds |
| 5 | (Slovakia) Alena Procházková | 44 bonus seconds |
| 6 | (Italy) Marianna Longa | 42 bonus seconds |

=== Stage 6 ===
3 January 2009, Val di Fiemme, Italy - Mass start

Men - 20 km Classic
| Place | Name | Time |
|---|---|---|
| 1 | (Germany) Axel Teichmann | 55:19,2 min |
| 2 | (Finland) Sami Jauhojärvi | + 0,3 s |
| 3 | (Kazakhstan) Nikolay Chebotko | + 1,3 s |
| 4 | (Switzerland) Dario Cologna | + 1,8 s |
| 5 | (Norway) Martin Johnsrud Sundby | + 2,5 s |
| 6 | (Russia) Maxim Vylegzhanin | + 3,9 s |

Women - 10 km Classic
| Place | Name | Time |
|---|---|---|
| 1 | (Finland) Virpi Kuitunen | 30:10,3 min |
| 2 | (Slovenia) Petra Majdič | + 13,8 s |
| 3 | (Finland) Aino-Kaisa Saarinen | + 20,5 s |
| 4 | (Italy) Marianna Longa | + 24,6 s |
| 5 | (Norway) Marit Bjørgen | + 33,0 s |
| 6 | (Finland) Pirjo Muranen | + 34,7 s |

=== Stage 7 ===
4 January 2009, Val di Fiemme - Pursuit

Men - 10 km Free Final Climb
| Place | Name | Time |
|---|---|---|
| 1 | (Canada) Ivan Babikov | 33:51,2 min |
| 2 | (Germany) Tom Reichelt | + 1,5 s |
| 3 | (Italy) Giorgio Di Centa | + 3,2 s |
| 4 | (Finland) Matti Heikkinen | + 12,0 s |
| 5 | (Czech Republic) Lukáš Bauer | + 15,2 s |
| 6 | (France) Jean-Marc Gaillard | + 21,7 s |

Women - 9 km Free Final Climb
| Place | Name | Time |
|---|---|---|
| 1 | (Norway) Therese Johaug | 35:07,7 min |
| 2 | (Norway) Kristin Størmer Steira | + 8,7 s |
| 3 | (Ukraine) Valentyna Shevchenko | + 44,3 s |
| 4 | (Poland) Justyna Kowalczyk | + 47,1 s |
| 5 | (Russia) Yevgeniya Medvedeva-Arbuzova | + 54,6 s |
| 6 | (Sweden) Anna Haag | + 58,4 s |
