= Cross-country skiing at the FIS Nordic World Ski Championships 2007 =

Cross-country skiing was one of the three disciplines of the FIS Nordic World Ski Championships 2007, held between February 22 and March 4, 2007 in Sapporo, Japan. The sprint events were held at the Sapporo Dome and the distance races were held at the Shirahatayama Open Stadium.

The distances and skiing styles were unchanged from Oberstdorf, and as in 2005, nine different nations won medals. However, France and Canada were without medals this time around, replaced by Belarus, who won their first medal ever through 19-year-old Leanid Karneyenka, and Slovenia, for whom Petra Majdič won silver on the very first day of the Championships.

Norway took the most medals: twelve medals of a possible 36, with five of twelve golds, despite falling in the men's team sprint where the Norwegians were defending champions. However, compared to 2005 Norway had one less gold medal and two fewer medals, largely due to the less than stellar performance of Marit Bjørgen, who won five medals in Oberstdorf, but earned her best individual finish of ninth in the 30 km event in Sapporo. However, Norwegian skiers won both the sprint and 15 km for men, events they had not taken in 2005, as well as dominating the 50 km with gold and silver.

Finland took three golds and a bronze, all by Virpi Kuitunen, who won the most medals at the games, while Germany won six medals but only one gold with Tobias Angerer in the 15 km + 15 km double pursuit where German skiers finished first, second and fourth. Russia won four medals, earned by the men's team (sprint and relay: both silvers) and Olga Zavyalova, but also had to suffer with a doping controversy with newcomer Sergey Shiryayev being disqualified for EPO doping and serving a two-year ban as a result.

The Czech Republic won three medals, with Kateřina Neumannová winning a gold and a silver medal at her final World Championships to retire with five medals, as did Italy, where 35-year-old Cristian Zorzi won his first gold medal at the World Championships with a team sprint win along with Renato Pasini. Finally, Sweden won two medals, with substitute Mats Larsson winning silver in the individual sprint, and the relay team winning bronze.

== Men's events ==
=== Individual sprint classical ===
February 22, 2007 at the Sapporo Dome. The defending champion was Vasily Rochev of Russia. Svartedal's third international win of the season was the most important one, improving significantly from his previous career-best 11th place. Rochev was eliminated in the semi-finals after losing contact with Swedes Björn Lind and Emil Jönsson over the final climb; Lind, the Olympic sprint champion, reached the final but lost the sprint for bronze to Rønning. Larsson, who was a reserve for former the world champion Thobias Fredriksson, was the best Swede to finish after passing Rønning at the final curve.

Medal	Athlete	Time
Gold	Jens Arne Svartedal (NOR)	3:03.8
Silver	Mats Larsson (SWE)	3:04.0
Bronze	Eldar Rønning (NOR)	3:04.6
4	Björn Lind (SWE)	
5	Andrew Newell (USA)	
6	Emil Jönsson (SWE)	
B final
7	Odd-Bjørn Hjelmeset (NOR)	
8	Vasily Rochev (RUS)	
9	Mattias Strandvall (FIN)	
10	Janusz Krężelok (POL)	

=== Team sprint freestyle ===
February 23, 2007 at the Sapporo Dome. The defending winners were Norway's Tore Ruud Hofstad and Tor Arne Hetland. Zorzi edged Rochev at the line to earn the gold. The Czech Republic team of Šperl and Kožíšek earned the bronze after the favored Norwegian team fell at the end of the third leg, causing the team to finish seventh in the final.

Medal	Team	Athletes	Time
Gold	Italy	Renato Pasini	17:50.6
Gold	Italy	Cristian Zorzi	17:50.6
Silver	Russia	Nikolay Morilov	17:50.6
Silver	Russia	Vasily Rochev	17:50.6
Bronze	Czech Republic	Milan Šperl	17:51.3
Bronze	Czech Republic	Dušan Kožíšek	17:51.3
4	Germany	Tobias Angerer	17:51.4
4	Germany	Axel Teichmann	17:51.4
5	Poland	Maciej Kreczmer	17:51.4
5	Poland	Janusz Krężelok	17:51.4
6	Canada	Devon Kershaw	17:54.9
6	Canada	Drew Goldsack	17:54.9

=== 15 km freestyle interval start ===
February 28, 2007 at the Shirahatayama Open Stadium. Pietro Piller Cottrer of Italy was the defending champion. Biathlete Lars Berger, with three World Championship medals in men's biathlon (including a silver medal at the most recent championships in the 4 x 7.5 km relay at Rasen-Antholz), started early and went through half the race before snow started to fill the tracks. This would prove advantegous when the third of the 121 starters, Leanid Karneyenka, with no World Cup starts and a previous best of 16th from the World Junior Championships, won silver, Belarus' first medal at the World Championships. Angerer, the World Cup leader, earned his second medal at the championships with a bronze. Berger is the first person to win medals in both the biathlon and Nordic skiing world championships in the same year. Austria's Johannes Eder originally finished fourth in this event, but was disqualified on November 22, 2007 after the FIS issued a two-year doping suspension in the wake of Eder's action during the Winter Olympics in Turin the previous year. Eder had appealed the initial ban in 2006 only to have the FIS reinstate the ban the following year.

The results below are correct as of November 29, 2007.

Medal	Athlete	Time
Gold	Lars Berger (NOR)	35:50.0
Silver	Leanid Karneyenka (BLR)	36:25.8
Bronze	Tobias Angerer (GER)	36:42.4
4	Axel Teichmann (GER)	37:04.6
5	Alexander Legkov (RUS)	37:06.4
6	Franz Göring (GER)	37:07.9
7	Johan Olsson (SWE)	37:09.3
8	Marcus Hellner (SWE)	37:13.0
9	Pietro Piller Cottrer (ITA)	37:14.3
10	Anders Södergren (SWE)	37:19.0

=== 15 km + 15 km double pursuit ===
February 24, 2007 at the Shirahatayama Open Stadium. France's Vincent Vittoz was the defending champion, but the Frenchman lost contact at the end of the classical section, never recovered, and finished tenth. The top three positions at the end of the classical part were Germany's Jens Filbrich (who finished fourth), Sweden's Mathias Fredriksson (who finished 14th), and Angerer. A peloton of 15–20 skiers entered the last lap in the lead, but Angerer blew the field apart in the final climb, reducing the field to six in the last 500 metres. Norway's Petter Northug, at his first individual World Championship appearance, advanced through the six-man group in the final 500 m stretch, but stuck a pole between his skis and took a tumble with approximately 300 metres to the finish, eventually finishing fifth. Teichmann beat Angerer in a dash to the finish, while Piller Cottrer settled for bronze. Teichmann and Angerer are the first Germans to win gold and silver at the same distance in the cross-country portion of the World Championships.

Medal	Athlete	Time
Gold	Axel Teichmann (GER)	1:11:35.8
Silver	Tobias Angerer (GER)	1:11:36.3
Bronze	Pietro Piller Cottrer (ITA)	1:11:36.7
4	Jens Filbrich (GER)	1:11:39.0
5	Petter Northug (NOR)	1:11:44.0
6	Alexander Legkov (RUS)	1:11:45.3
7	Lukáš Bauer (CZE)	1:11:51.3
8	Anders Södergren (SWE)	1:11:51.6
9	Toni Livers (SUI)	1:11:51.7
10	Vincent Vittoz (FRA)	1:11:52.4

=== 50 km classical mass start ===
March 4, 2007 at the Shirahatayama Open Stadium. Frode Estil of Norway was the defending champion and lost it in the final meters of the event to fellow Norwegian Hjelmeset in a race where the lead changed hands continuously, as more and more people fell off the leading group. At 5 km, the top three were Eldar Rønning (Norway), Jean Marc Gaillard (France), and Dan Roycroft (Canada), in a peloton still consisting of nearly 60 skiers. Rønning and Roycroft would fall off within 25 km, while Gaillard stayed with the peloton for nearly 40 km. By the 20 km mark, the leaders were Sweden's Anders Södergren (who would finish 14th), Hjelmeset, and Estil, with a field of 20 remaining within ten seconds of the leader. At the 35 km mark, a group of nine had taken the lead, with Estil, Lukáš Bauer of the Czech Republic (who would finish fifth after leading for most of the second of half of the race), and Gaillard in the top three positions. Midway through the race, Hjelmeset suffered a broken binding and had to have one of his skis replaced. Four skiers fell off before the last 3.75 km loop, leaving two Norwegians, two Germans (Jens Filbrich and Tobias Angerer), and Bauer to fight for the medals. The two Norwegians attacked at the 48 km mark, and then held on for first and second. It was Hjelmeset's third championships gold medal, the first in an individual event. Germany's Filbrich would earn the bronze, his first individual medal in his championship history.

Medal	Athlete	Time
Gold	Odd-Bjørn Hjelmeset (NOR)	2:20:12.6
Silver	Frode Estil (NOR)	2:20:13.0
Bronze	Jens Filbrich (GER)	2:20:17.1
4	Tobias Angerer (GER)	2:20:23.1
5	Lukáš Bauer (CZE)	2:20:25.7
6	Martin Bajčičák (SVK)	2:20:53.6
7	Jean-Marc Gaillard (FRA)	2:21:36.6
8	Jaak Mae (EST)	2:21:46.2
9	Nikolay Pankratov (RUS)	2:21:50.6
10	Ville Nousiainen (FIN)	2:22:27.5

=== 4 × 10 km relay ===
March 2, 2007 at the Shirahatayama Open Stadium. The defending champions of this event were the Norwegian foursome of Odd-Bjørn Hjelmeset, Frode Estil, Lars Berger, and Tore Ruud Hofstad which they successfully defended following a race in which the lead changed hands at the line on all four legs of the event. The top three after the first leg were Finland (who finished sixth), France (who finished fifth), and Norway with Finland's Ville Nousiainen having the fastest leg of 25:39.4. Leaders after the second leg were a tie for first with Norway and Sweden, followed by Russia with Sweden's Mathias Fredriksson having the fastest time of 24:45.5 (also the fastest time in the classical legs of the event). Russia, Norway, Sweden were the top three leaders after the third leg with Russian Alexander Legkov having the fastest time of 20:03.0 (also the fastest time in the freestyle legs of the event). Petter Northug of Norway had the fastest time in the anchor leg (20:15.1) to propel the Norwegians to the gold ahead of Russia and Sweden while Dementyev edged Södergren by 0.3 seconds to help Russia earn the silver over the Swedes.

Medal	Team	Athletes	Time
Gold	Norway	Eldar Rønning	1:30:49.2
Gold	Norway	Odd-Bjørn Hjelmeset	1:30:49.2
Gold	Norway	Lars Berger	1:30:49.2
Gold	Norway	Petter Northug	1:30:49.2
Silver	Russia	Nikolay Pankratov	1:30:52.4
Silver	Russia	Vasily Rochev	1:30:52.4
Silver	Russia	Alexander Legkov	1:30:52.4
Silver	Russia	Yevgeny Dementyev	1:30:52.4
Bronze	Sweden	Martin Larsson	1:30:52.7
Bronze	Sweden	Mathias Fredriksson	1:30:52.7
Bronze	Sweden	Marcus Hellner	1:30:52.7
Bronze	Sweden	Anders Södergren	1:30:52.7
4	Germany	Jens Filbrich	1:31:39.7
4	Germany	Franz Göring	1:31:39.7
4	Germany	Tobias Angerer	1:31:39.7
4	Germany	Axel Teichmann	1:31:39.7
5	France	Jean-Marc Gaillard	1:32:15.0
5	France	Vincent Vittoz	1:32:15.0
5	France	Emmanuel Jonnier	1:32:15.0
5	France	Alexandre Rousselet	1:32:15.0
6	Finland	Ville Nousiainen	1:32:55.5
6	Finland	Sami Jauhojärvi	1:32:55.5
6	Finland	Juha Lallukka	1:32:55.5
6	Finland	Teemu Kattilakoski	1:32:55.5

== Women's event ==
=== Individual sprint classical ===
February 22, 2007 at the Sapporo Dome. Emelie Öhrstig of Sweden was the defending champion. Majdič led for almost the entire race, with 20-year-old Jacobsen in second ahead of the season's dominant skier Kuitunen. In the final dash, Jacobsen came from behind to nip Majdič at the line. Majdič won Slovenia's first ever medal in cross-country skiing at the World Championships.

Medal	Athlete	Time
Gold	Astrid Jacobsen (NOR)	2:50.9
Silver	Petra Majdič (SLO)	2:51.1
Bronze	Virpi Kuitunen (FIN)	2:51.2
4	Anna Dahlberg (SWE)	
5	Madoka Natsumi (JPN)	
6	Lina Andersson (SWE)	
B Final
7	Pirjo Manninen (FIN)	
8	Ida Ingemarsdotter (SWE)	
9	Manuela Henkel (GER)	
10	Marit Bjørgen (NOR)	

=== Team sprint freestyle ===
February 23, 2007 at the Sapporo Dome. The defending champions in the event were the Norwegian duo of Hilde Gjermundshaug Pedersen and Marit Bjørgen. Kuitunen and Jacobsen earned their second medals of the championships.

Medal	Team	Athletes	Time
Gold	Finland	Riitta-Liisa Roponen	16:20.9
Gold	Finland	Virpi Kuitunen	16:20.9
Silver	Germany	Evi Sachenbacher-Stehle	16:21.6
Silver	Germany	Claudia Künzel-Nystad	16:21.6
Bronze	Norway	Astrid Jacobsen	16:24.0
Bronze	Norway	Marit Bjørgen	16:24.0
4	Sweden	Britta Norgren	16:40.5
4	Sweden	Lina Andersson	16:40.5
5	Kazakhstan	Oxana Yatskaya	16:42.8
5	Kazakhstan	Elena Kolomina	16:42.8
6	Belarus	Viktoria Lopatina	16:44.0
6	Belarus	Olga Vasiljonok	16:44.0

=== 10 km freestyle interval start ===
February 27, 2007 at the Shirahatayama Open Stadium. The Czech Republic's Kateřina Neumannová was the defending champion, and avenged her defeat to Zavyalova in the pursuit race by leading the entire race to win by 26.5 seconds. Neumannová led the entire race while Savialova and Norway's Kristin Størmer Steira were second and third at all three checkpoints. In the final kilometres, Arianna Follis rallied by gaining 11 seconds in the final 1.7 km to beat Steira by four seconds. Zavyalova managed to hold on by finishing 3.7 seconds faster than Follis, but a couple of minutes later Neumannová finished in first place to defend her title.

Medal	Athlete	Time
Gold	Kateřina Neumannová (CZE)	23:58.4
Silver	Olga Zavyalova (RUS)	24:24.9
Bronze	Arianna Follis (ITA)	24:28.6
4	Kristin Størmer Steira (NOR)	24:33.9
5	Charlotte Kalla (SWE)	24:41.9
6	Evi Sachenbacher-Stehle (GER)	24:44.4
7	Riitta-Liisa Roponen (FIN)	24:48.4
8	Valentyna Shevchenko (UKR)	24:51.7
9	Kristina Šmigun (EST)	24:56.3
10	Natalya Korostelyova (RUS)	24:57.2

=== 7.5 km + 7.5 km double pursuit ===
February 25, 2007 at the Shirahatayama Open Stadium. Russia's Julija Tchepalova had been the defending champion, but was not defending her title due to being on maternity leave. The top three skiers leading at the end of the classical portion were Charlotte Kalla of Sweden (she finished seventh), Kristin Størmer Steira of Norway, and Justyna Kowalczyk of Poland (she finished ninth). Størmer Steira led the field through the first lap of the free style leg of the pursuit, with the lead group down to four in the last lap, including Steira, Olga Zavyalova, Kateřina Neumannová and Evi Sachenbacher-Stehle. Zavyalova led for the entire final lap, and held on in the dash for the finish, while Sachenbacher-Stehle could not keep up with the group and finished fourth. World Cup leader Virpi Kuitunen lost contact with the leading group at the end of the classical leg and did not finish the race.

Medal	Athlete	Time
Gold	Olga Zavyalova (RUS)	41:27.5
Silver	Kateřina Neumannová (CZE)	41:28.0
Bronze	Kristin Størmer Steira (NOR)	41:29.6
4	Evi Sachenbacher-Stehle (GER)	41:32.1
5	Riitta-Liisa Roponen (FIN)	41:51.5
6	Aino-Kaisa Saarinen (FIN)	41:52.4
7	Charlotte Kalla (SWE)	41:53.6
8	Marianna Longa (ITA)	41:53.2
9	Justyna Kowalczyk (POL)	41:59.5
10	Kristina Šmigun (EST)	42:07.0

=== 30 km classical mass start ===
March 3, 2007 at the Shirahatayama Open Stadium. Marit Bjørgen of Norway was the defending champion and would finish ninth. Defending Olympic champion Kateřina Neumannová of the Czech Republic did not start. Kuitunen came in as the heavy favorite for the event given her performance in previous classical skiing events during the 2006–7 World Cup season. Johaug, Steira, and Kuitunen broke away around the 13 km mark, and Johaug remained within the leading group until 19 km, when Steira and Kuitunen pulled away. Kuitunen would beat Steira to win her third gold of the championships, first individual gold, and fourth total medal. The 18-year-old Johaug, who only had two World Cup races in her career prior to this event, would take bronze.

Medal	Athlete	Time
Gold	Virpi Kuitunen (FIN)	1:29:47.1
Silver	Kristin Størmer Steira (NOR)	1:29:54.0
Bronze	Therese Johaug (NOR)	1:31:09.9
4	Aino-Kaisa Saarinen (FIN)	1:31:30.1
5	Petra Majdič (SLO)	1:32:04.5
6	Kristina Šmigun (EST)	1:32:19.4
7	Lada Nesterenko (UKR)	1:32:37.9
8	Olga Zavyalova (RUS)	1:32:54.1
9	Marit Bjørgen (NOR)	1:33:15.0
10	Evi Sachenbacher-Stehle (GER)	1:33:31.5

=== 4 × 5 km relay ===
March 1, 2007 at the Shirahatayama Open Stadium. Norway's relay team of Vibeke Skofterud, Hilde Gjermundshaug Pedersen, Kristin Størmer Steira, and Marit Bjørgen were the defending champions. Finland lead from start to finish in the event with both Kuitunen and Saarinen earning the fastest times in the classical legs of the competition (13:53.0). Roponen had the fourth fastest time in the third leg (first in freestyle) while Manninen had the tenth fastest time in the anchor leg, but the Finns had too big of a lead and were able to hold off the anchor leg of Germany's Sachenbacher-Stehle. The top three positions after the first leg were Finland, Norway, and Switzerland while the leaders after the second leg were Finland, Norway, and Germany. Sweden's Charlotte Kalla had the fastest time in the third leg (12:32.3), moving the Swedes from sixth to third after the third leg behind Finland and Norway (Sweden would finish fourth in the race) while the Czech Republic's Kateřina Neumannová had the fastest time both in the freestyle and the anchor legs (12:27.8) to move the Czechs from seventh to fifth. Sachenbacher-Stehle passed Norway's Jacobsen with 500 meters left in the race to earn Germany the silver medal by 3.8 seconds over the Norwegians. Pirjo Manninen joined her older brother Hannu in becoming the first brother and sister to win gold medals at the same championships. Hannu had won the Nordic combined sprint and team events earlier in these championships.

Medal	Team	Athletes	Time
Gold	Finland	Virpi Kuitunen	54:18.6
Gold	Finland	Aino-Kaisa Saarinen	54:18.6
Gold	Finland	Riitta-Liisa Roponen	54:18.6
Gold	Finland	Pirjo Manninen	54:18.6
Silver	Germany	Stefanie Böhler	54:30.5
Silver	Germany	Viola Bauer	54:30.5
Silver	Germany	Claudia Künzel-Nystad	54:30.5
Silver	Germany	Evi Sachenbacher-Stehle	54:30.5
Bronze	Norway	Vibeke Skofterud	54:34.3
Bronze	Norway	Marit Bjørgen	54:34.3
Bronze	Norway	Kristin Størmer Steira	54:34.3
Bronze	Norway	Astrid Jacobsen	54:34.3
4	Sweden	Anna Dahlberg	54:50.3
4	Sweden	Lina Andersson	54:50.3
4	Sweden	Charlotte Kalla	54:50.3
4	Sweden	Britta Norgren	54:50.3
5	Czech Republic	Helena Erbenová	55:02.9
5	Czech Republic	Kamila Rajdlová	55:02.9
5	Czech Republic	Ivana Janečková	55:02.9
5	Czech Republic	Kateřina Neumannová	55:02.9
6	Italy	Magda Genuin	55:14.7
6	Italy	Marianna Longa	55:14.7
6	Italy	Sabina Valbusa	55:14.7
6	Italy	Arianna Follis	55:14.7

== Doping controversy ==
On February 21, 2007, Sergey Shiryayev of Russia was involved in pre-competition testing for doping with a blood and urine sample. The blood sample in the "A-test" turned out high in hemoglobin, so the "B-test" was evaluated and confirmed to contain EPO. Shiryayev, who had his best finish of 11th in the 15 km event at the championships, was subsequently disqualified on March 4, 2007. FIS President Gian Franco Kasper expressed both disappointment in Shiriaev's doping actions and happiness in the efficiency of FIS's doping controls. Shiryayev's case was heard in Portnoz, Slovenia at the FIS Council Meeting in May 2007. The result of the hearing was Shiryayev receiving a two-year suspension from the FIS with two coaches receiving sanctions from the Russian ski federation because of this.
