= Sergey Novikov (cross-country skier) =

Russian cross-country skier

Personal information
- Full name: Sergey Vladimirovich Novikov
- Nationality: Russia
- Born: 28 August 1980 (age 45) Dolinsk, Soviet Union

Sport
- Sport: Skiing

World Cup career
- Seasons: 15 – (2000–2014)
- Indiv. starts: 108
- Indiv. podiums: 1
- Indiv. wins: 0
- Team starts: 24
- Team podiums: 2
- Team wins: 1
- Overall titles: 0 – (39th in 2006)
- Discipline titles: 0
Medal record
Men's cross-country skiing
Representing Russia
U23 World Championships
Gold medal – first place	2003 Valdidentro	15 km skiathlon
Junior World Championships
Gold medal – first place	2000 Štrbské Pleso	Individual sprint
Bronze medal – third place	1999 Saalfelden	4 × 10 km relay

Sergey Vladimirovich Novikov (Russian: Сергей Владимирович Новиков, born 28 August 1980 in Dolinsk, Soviet Union) is a Russian cross-country skier who has competed since 1999. His lone World Cup victory was in a 4 × 10 km event in Switzerland in 2007 while Novikov's best individual finish was third in a 15 km event in Estonia the previous year.

Competing in three Winter Olympics, his best finish was sixth in the 4 × 10 km relay at Salt Lake City in 2002. Novikov's best finish at the FIS Nordic World Ski Championships was fourth in the 4 × 10 km relay at Val di Fiemme in 2003.

== Cross-country skiing results ==
All results are sourced from the International Ski Federation (FIS).

=== Olympic Games ===
Year	Age	15 km	Pursuit	30 km	50 km	Sprint	4 × 10 km relay	Team sprint
2002	21	10	16	—	—	16	6	—N/a
2006	25	8	—	—N/a	—	25	6	—
2010	29	—	43	—N/a	—	—	—	—

=== World Championships ===
Year	Age	15 km	Pursuit	30 km	50 km	Sprint	4 × 10 km relay	Team sprint
2003	22	—	17	—	—	14	4	—N/a
2007	26	—	—	—N/a	41	—	—	—
2009	28	25	46	—N/a	—	—	DSQ	—

=== World Cup ===
Season	Age	Discipline standings					Ski Tour standings		
Season	Age	Overall	Distance	Long Distance	Middle Distance	Sprint	Nordic Opening	Tour de Ski	World Cup Final
2000	19	NC	—N/a	NC	NC	NC	—N/a	—N/a	—N/a
2001	20	NC	—N/a	—N/a	—N/a	NC	—N/a	—N/a	—N/a
2002	21	78	—N/a	—N/a	—N/a	NC	—N/a	—N/a	—N/a
2003	22	70	—N/a	—N/a	—N/a	49	—N/a	—N/a	—N/a
2004	23	43	31	—N/a	—N/a	51	—N/a	—N/a	—N/a
2005	24	112	71	—N/a	—N/a	NC	—N/a	—N/a	—N/a
2006	25	39	27	—N/a	—N/a	63	—N/a	—N/a	—N/a
2007	26	57	50	—N/a	—N/a	NC	—N/a	22	—N/a
2008	27	106	62	—N/a	—N/a	—	—N/a	—	—
2009	28	138	85	—N/a	—N/a	NC	—N/a	—	51
2010	29	51	29	—N/a	—N/a	65	—N/a	—	35
2011	30	NC	NC	—N/a	—N/a	—	—	—	—
2012	31	NC	NC	—N/a	—N/a	—	—	—	—
2013	32	NC	NC	—N/a	—N/a	NC	—	—	—
2014	33	135	88	—N/a	—N/a	NC	30	—	—

==== Individual podiums ====
- 1 podium – (1 WC)

No.	Season	Date	Location	Race	Level	Place
1	2005–06	7 January 2006	Otepää, Estonia	15 km Individual C	World Cup	3rd

==== Team podiums ====
- 1 victory – (1 RL)
- 2 podiums – (2 RL)

No.	Season	Date	Location	Race	Level	Place	Teammates
1	2003–04	7 February 2004	La Clusaz, France	4 × 10 km Relay C/F	World Cup	3rd	Pankratov / Ivanov / Dementyev
2	2006–07	4 February 2007	Davos, Switzerland	4 × 10 km Relay C/F	World Cup	1st	Babikov / Chernousov / Shiryayev
