= Vasily Rochev (skier, born 1980) =

Russian cross-country skier

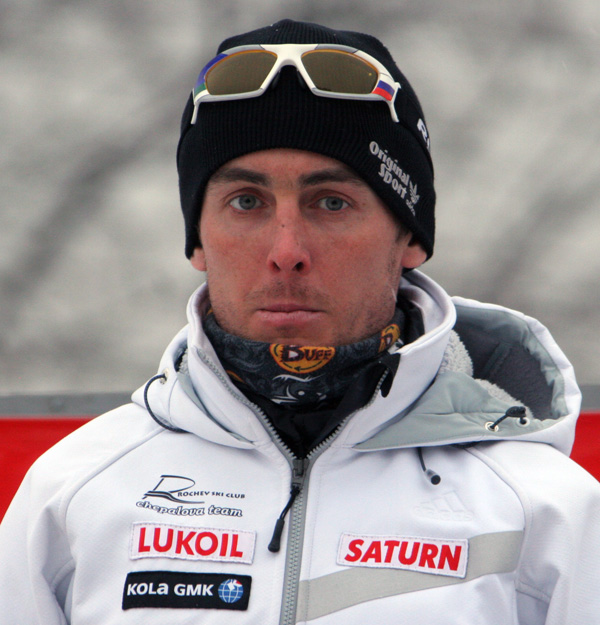
- Vasily Rochev in 2008

Personal information
- Full name: Vasily Vasilyevich Rochev
- Nationality: Russia
- Born: 23 October 1980 (age 45) Syktyvkar, Soviet Union

Sport
- Sport: Skiing

World Cup career
- Seasons: 11 – (2000–2010)
- Indiv. starts: 130
- Indiv. podiums: 8
- Indiv. wins: 2
- Team starts: 33
- Team podiums: 9
- Team wins: 3
- Overall titles: 0 – (6th in 2006)
- Discipline titles: 0
Medal record
Men's cross-country skiing
Representing Russia
Olympic Games
Bronze medal – third place	2006 Turin	Team sprint
World Championships
Gold medal – first place	2005 Oberstdorf	Individual sprint
Silver medal – second place	2007 Sapporo	Team sprint
Silver medal – second place	2007 Sapporo	4 × 10 km relay
Bronze medal – third place	2005 Oberstdorf	4 × 10 km relay
Junior World Championships
Gold medal – first place	2000 Štrbské Pleso	4 × 10 km relay
Silver medal – second place	2000 Štrbské Pleso	30 km classical

Vasily Vasilyevich Rochev (Russian: Василий Васильевич Рочев; born 23 October 1980 in Syktyvkar, Komi ASSR, Russian SFSR) is a Russian cross-country skier who has competed since 2000. He won the bronze medal in the Team sprint event at the 2006 Winter Olympics at Turin.

Rochev has four medals at the FIS Nordic World Ski Championships with a gold (Individual sprint: 2005), two silvers (Team sprint and 4x10 km: both 2007), and one bronze (4x10 km: 2005). He has won fourteen events in cross-country skiing since 2002.

He is the son of Vasily Rochev who won two medals at the 1980 Winter Olympics in Lake Placid, New York (gold: 4 x 10 km, silver: 30 km), and two medals at the 1974 FIS Nordic World Ski Championships in Falun (silver: 4 x 10 km, bronze: 15 km).

He is the second husband of fellow Russian cross-country skier Yuliya Chepalova, who gave birth to their daughter Vaselina in April 2007. Chepalova had another child in 2003 from a previous marriage.

== Cross-country skiing results ==
All results are sourced from the International Ski Federation (FIS).

=== Olympic Games ===
- 1 medal – (1 bronze)

Year	Age	15 km	Pursuit	30 km	50 km	Sprint	4 × 10 km relay	Team sprint
2002	21	25	—	—	—	28	—	—N/a
2006	25	4	—	—N/a	—	11	6	Bronze

=== World Championships ===
- 5 medals – (1 gold, 2 silver, 1 bronze)

Year	Age	15 km	Pursuit	30 km	50 km	Sprint	4 × 10 km relay	Team sprint
2001	20	24	21	—	—	—	—	—N/a
2003	22	31	—	—	—	7	4	—N/a
2005	24	22	—	—N/a	—	Gold	Bronze	8
2007	26	—	—	—N/a	—	8	Silver	Silver
2009	28	19	—	—N/a	—	11	DSQ	—

=== World Cup ===
==== Season standings ====
Season	Age	Discipline standings					Ski Tour standings	
Season	Age	Overall	Distance	Long Distance	Middle Distance	Sprint	Tour de Ski	World Cup Final
2000	19	84	—N/a	—	—	47	—N/a	—N/a
2001	20	102	—N/a	—N/a	—N/a	68	—N/a	—N/a
2002	21	50	—N/a	—N/a	—N/a	23	—N/a	—N/a
2003	22	20	—N/a	—N/a	—N/a	15	—N/a	—N/a
2004	23	32	78	—N/a	—N/a	11	—N/a	—N/a
2005	24	15	16	—N/a	—N/a	22	—N/a	—N/a
2006	25	6	19	—N/a	—N/a	6	—N/a	—N/a
2007	26	23	48	—N/a	—N/a	10	—	—N/a
2008	27	41	39	—N/a	—N/a	34	—	51
2009	28	17	28	—N/a	—N/a	22	5	38
2010	29	78	65	—N/a	—N/a	64	—	—

==== Individual podiums ====
- 2 victories – (2 WC)
- 8 podiums – (7 WC, 1 SWC)

No.	Season	Date	Location	Race	Level	Place
1	2002–03	30 November 2002	Rukatunturi, Finland	15 km Individual C	World Cup	1st
2	2004–05	20 November 2004	Gällivare, Sweden	15 km Individual C	World Cup	3rd
3	2004–05	28 November 2004	Rukatunturi, Finland	15 km Individual C	World Cup	2nd
4	2005–06	7 January 2006	Otepää, Estonia	15 km Individual C	World Cup	1st
5	2005–06	8 January 2006	Otepää, Estonia	1.5 km Sprint C	World Cup	3rd
6	2005–06	22 January 2006	Oberstdorf, Germany	1.2 km Sprint C	World Cup	3rd
7	2006–07	28 January 2007	Otepää, Estonia	1.2 km Sprint C	World Cup	2nd
8	2008–09	29 December 2008	Prague, Czech Republic	1.3 km Sprint F	Stage World Cup	2nd

==== Team podiums ====
- 3 victories – (1 RL, 2 TS)
- 9 podiums – (5 RL, 4 TS

No.	Season	Date	Location	Race	Level	Place	Teammate(s)
1	2001–02	27 November 2001	Kuopio, Finland	4 × 10 km Relay C/F	World Cup	3rd	Ivanov / Bolshakov / Vilisov
2	2003–04	15 February 2004	Oberstdorf, Germany	6 × 1.2 km Team Sprint F	World Cup	3rd	Alypov
3	2003–04	6 March 2004	Lahti, Finland	6 × 1.0 km Team Sprint C	World Cup	1st	Pankratov
4	2004–05	5 December 2004	Bern, Switzerland	6 × 1.1 km Team Sprint F	World Cup	1st	Alypov
5	2004–05	15 December 2004	Asiago, Italy	6 × 1.2 km Team Sprint C	World Cup	2nd	Pankratov
6	2006–07	19 November 2006	Gällivare, Sweden	4 × 10 km Relay C/F	World Cup	2nd	Pankratov / Legkov / Dementyev
7	2006–07	17 December 2006	La Clusaz, France	4 × 10 km Relay C/F	World Cup	1st	Pankratov / Legkov / Dementyev
8	2006–07	25 March 2007	Falun, Sweden	4 × 10 km Relay C/F	World Cup	3rd	Pankratov / Legkov / Vylegzhanin
9	2007–08	25 November 2007	Beitostølen, Norway	4 × 10 km Relay C/F	World Cup	3rd	Pankratov / Legkov / Dementyev
