= Vitaly Denisov =

Russian cross-country skier

Personal information
- Nationality: Russia
- Born: 27 February 1976 (age 50) Barnaul, Soviet Union

Sport
- Sport: Skiing

World Cup career
- Seasons: 7 – (1997–2003)
- Indiv. starts: 74
- Indiv. podiums: 1
- Indiv. wins: 0
- Team starts: 17
- Team podiums: 8
- Team wins: 1
- Overall titles: 0 – (32nd in 2000)
- Discipline titles: 0
Medal record
Men's cross-country skiing
Representing Russia
World Championships
Bronze medal – third place	2001 Lahti	10 km + 10 km combined pursuit
Junior World Championships
Gold medal – first place	1996 Asiago	4 × 10 km relay

Vitaly Denisov (born February 27, 1976) is a Russian cross-country skier who competed from 1997 to 2003. He won a bronze medal in the 10 km + 10 km combined pursuit at the 2001 FIS Nordic World Ski Championships in Lahti.

Denisov's best individual finish at the Winter Olympics was 5th in the 10 km + 10 km combined pursuit at Salt Lake City in 2002. He won two individual races in his career (1999, 2002).

== Cross-country skiing results ==
All results are sourced from the International Ski Federation (FIS).

=== Olympic Games ===
Year	Age	15 km	Pursuit	30 km	50 km	Sprint	4 × 10 km relay
2002	26	7	5	—	—	30	6

=== World Championships ===
- 1 medal – (1 bronze)

Year	Age	10 km	15 km	Pursuit	30 km	50 km	Sprint	4 × 10 km relay
1999	23	38	—N/a	25	—	27	—N/a	—
2001	25	—N/a	15	Bronze	—	—	—	4
2003	27	—N/a	9	—	46	—	—	4

=== World Cup ===
==== Season standings ====
Season	Age	Discipline standings			
Season	Age	Overall	Long Distance	Middle Distance	Sprint
1997	21	NC	NC	—N/a	—
1998	22	72	45	—N/a	—
1999	23	47	65	—N/a	53
2000	24	32	23	24	47
2001	25	34	—N/a	—N/a	40
2002	26	37	—N/a	—N/a	NC
2003	27	38	—N/a	—N/a	56

==== Individual podiums ====
- 1 podium

No.	Season	Date	Location	Race	Level	Place
1	2001–02	8 January 2002	Val di Fiemme, Italy	30 km Mass Start C	World Cup	2nd

==== Team podiums ====
- 1 victory – (1 RL)
- 8 podiums – (8 RL)

No.	Season	Date	Location	Race	Level	Place	Teammates
1	1998–99	14 March 1999	Falun, Sweden	4 × 10 km Relay C/F	World Cup	3rd	Ivanov / Prokurorov / Vilisov
2	1998–99	21 March 1999	Oslo, Norway	4 × 10 km Relay C	World Cup	2nd	Ivanov / Prokurorov / Vilisov
3	1999–00	13 January 2000	Nové Město, Czech Republic	4 × 10 km Relay C/F	World Cup	3rd	Ivanov / Vilisov / Prokurorov
4	1999–00	27 February 2000	Falun, Sweden	4 × 10 km Relay F	World Cup	2nd	Ivanov / Bolshakov / Vilisov
5	1999–00	5 March 2000	Lahti, Finland	4 × 10 km Relay C/F	World Cup	3rd	Bolshakov / Ivanov / Vilisov
6	2000–01	9 December 2000	Santa Caterina, Italy	4 × 5 km Relay C/F	World Cup	3rd	Ivanov / Bolshakov / Vilisov
7	2000–01	21 March 2001	Lugnet, Falun, Sweden	4 × 10 km Relay C/F	World Cup	1st	Ivanov / Bolshakov / Vilisov
8	2001–02	16 December 2001	Davos, Switzerland	4 × 10 km Relay C/F	World Cup	2nd	Ivanov / Vilisov / Bolshakov
