= Vladimir Vilisov =

Russian cross-country skier

Personal information
- Full name: Vladimir Petrovich Vilisov
- Nationality: Russia
- Born: 19 April 1976 (age 50) Novokuznetsk, Russian SFSR, Soviet Union

Sport
- Sport: Skiing

World Cup career
- Seasons: 8 – (1998–2005)
- Indiv. starts: 94
- Indiv. podiums: 2
- Indiv. wins: 0
- Team starts: 23
- Team podiums: 10
- Team wins: 1
- Overall titles: 0 – (21st in 1999)
- Discipline titles: 0
Medal record
Men's cross-country skiing
Representing Russia
Junior World Championships
Gold medal – first place	1996 Asiago	4 × 10 km relay

Vladimir Petrovich Vilisov (Russian: Владимир Петрович Вилисов; born 19 April 1976) is a Russian cross-country skier. He competed in the men's 30 kilometre freestyle mass start event at the 2002 Winter Olympics.

== Cross-country skiing results ==
All results are sourced from the International Ski Federation.

=== Olympic Games ===
Year	Age	15 km	Pursuit	30 km	50 km	Sprint	4 × 10 km relay
2002	25	—	36	15	15	—	—

=== World Championships ===
Year	Age	10 km	15 km	Pursuit	30 km	50 km	Sprint	4 × 10 km relay
1999	22	—	—N/a	—	9	7	—N/a	7
2001	24	—N/a	—	13	11	7	—	4
2003	26	—N/a	—	35	13	17	—	—

=== World Cup ===
==== Season standings ====
Season	Age					
Season	Age	Overall	Distance	Long Distance	Middle Distance	Sprint
1998	21	102	—N/a	67	—N/a	—
1999	22	21	—N/a	12	—N/a	26
2000	23	25	—N/a	8	35	30
2001	24	28	—N/a	—N/a	—N/a	31
2002	25	56	—N/a	—N/a	—N/a	57
2003	26	35	—N/a	—N/a	—N/a	67
2004	27	47	30	—N/a	—N/a	66
2005	28	138	87	—N/a	—N/a	NC

==== Individual podiums ====
- 2 podiums – (2 WC)

No.	Season	Date	Location	Place	Level	Place
1	1998–99	7 March 1999	Lahti, Finland	15 km Individual C	World Cup	2nd
2	1999–00	4 March 2000	Lahti, Finland	30 km Mass Start C	World Cup	3rd

==== Team podiums ====
- 1 victory – (1 RL)
- 10 podiums – (10 RL)

No.	Season	Date	Location	Race	Level	Place	Teammates
1	1998–99	14 March 1999	Falun, Sweden	4 × 10 km Relay C/F	World Cup	3rd	Denisov / Ivanov / Prokurorov
2	1998–99	21 March 1999	Oslo, Norway	4 × 10 km Relay C	World Cup	2nd	Denisov / Ivanov / Prokurorov
3	1999–00	13 January 2000	Nové Město, Czech Republic	4 × 10 km Relay C/F	World Cup	3rd	Denisov / Ivanov / Prokurorov
4	1999–00	27 February 2000	Falun, Sweden	4 × 10 km Relay F	World Cup	2nd	Denisov / Bolshakov / Ivanov
5	1999–00	5 March 2000	Lahti, Finland	4 × 10 km Relay C/F	World Cup	3rd	Denisov / Ivanov / Bolshakov
6	2000–01	9 December 2000	Santa Caterina, Italy	4 × 5 km Relay C/F	World Cup	3rd	Denisov / Ivanov / Bolshakov
7	2000–01	21 March 2001	Lugnet, Falun, Sweden	4 × 10 km Relay C/F	World Cup	1st	Denisov / Ivanov / Bolshakov
8	2001–02	21 November 2001	Kuopio, Finland	4 × 10 km Relay C/F	World Cup	3rd	Rochev / Ivanov / Bolshakov
9	2001–02	16 December 2001	Davos, Switzerland	4 × 10 km Relay C/F	World Cup	2nd	Denisov / Ivanov / Bolshakov
10	2003–04	11 January 2004	Otepää, Estonia	4 × 10 km Relay C/F	World Cup	3rd	Pankratov / Ivanov / Alypov
