= Nikolay Bolshakov =

Russian cross-country skier

Personal information
- Nationality: Russia
- Born: 11 May 1977 (age 49) Chernogorsk, Soviet Union

Sport
- Sport: Skiing

World Cup career
- Seasons: 7 – (1998, 2000–2003, 2005–2006)
- Indiv. starts: 55
- Indiv. podiums: 0
- Team starts: 12
- Team podiums: 6
- Team wins: 1
- Overall titles: 0 – (45th in 2000)
- Discipline titles: 0
Medal record
Men'scross-country skiing
Representing Russia
World Championships
Bronze medal – third place	2005 Oberstdorf	4 × 10 km relay
Junior World Championships
Silver medal – second place	1997 Canmore	10 km classical
Silver medal – second place	1997 Canmore	4 × 10 km relay

Nikolay Valerievich Bolshakov (Russian: Никола́й Валерьевич Большако́в; born 11 May 1977) is a Russian cross-country skier who has competed since 2000. He won the bronze medal in the 4 × 10 km relay at the 2005 FIS Nordic World Ski Championships in Oberstdorf.

Bolschakov's best individual finish was a 14th in a 10 km event in Finland in 2005.

== Cross-country skiing results ==
All results are sourced from the International Ski Federation (FIS).

=== Olympic Games ===
Year	Age	15 km	Pursuit	30 km	50 km	Sprint	4 × 10 km relay
2002	24	10	16	7	—	—	6

=== World Championships ===
- 1 medal – (1 bronze)

Year	Age	15 km	Pursuit	30 km	50 km	Sprint	4 × 10 km relay	Team sprint
2001	23	—	29	—	—	35	4	—N/a
2005	27	—	—	—N/a	—	—	Bronze	—

=== World Cup ===
==== Season standings ====
Season	Age	Discipline standings				
Season	Age	Overall	Distance	Long Distance	Middle Distance	Sprint
1998	20	NC	—N/a	NC	—N/a	—
2000	22	45	—N/a	44	30	NC
2001	23	88	—N/a	—N/a	—N/a	NC
2002	24	49	—N/a	—N/a	—N/a	NC
2003	25	47	—N/a	—N/a	—N/a	NC
2005	27	125	81	—N/a	—N/a	—
2006	28	NC	NC	—N/a	—N/a	—

==== Team podiums ====
- 1 victory – (1 RL)
- 6 podiums – (6 RL)

No.	Season	Date	Location	Race	Level	Place	Teammates
1	1999–00	27 February 2000	Falun, Sweden	4 × 10 km Relay F	World Cup	2nd	Denisov / Ivanov / Vilisov
2	1999–00	5 March 2000	Lahti, Finland	4 × 10 km Relay C/F	World Cup	3rd	Denisov / Ivanov / Vilisov
3	2000–01	9 December 2000	Santa Caterina, Italy	4 × 5 km Relay C/F	World Cup	3rd	Denisov / Ivanov / Vilisov
4	2000–01	21 March 2001	Lugnet, Falun, Sweden	4 × 10 km Relay C/F	World Cup	1st	Denisov / Ivanov / Vilisov
5	2001–02	21 November 2001	Kuopio, Finland	4 × 10 km Relay C/F	World Cup	3rd	Rochev / Ivanov / Vilisov
6	2001–02	16 December 2001	Davos, Switzerland	4 × 10 km Relay C/F	World Cup	2nd	Denisov / Ivanov / Vilisov
