= FIS Nordic World Ski Championships 2009 – Men's 4 × 10 kilometre relay =

Men's 4 × 10 kilometre relay at the FIS Nordic World Ski Championships 2009
- Date: 27 February 2009
- Competitors: 60 from 15 nations
- Winning time: 1:41:50.6

Medalists
gold medal	Eldar Rønning; Odd-Bjørn Hjelmeset; Tore Ruud Hofstad; Petter Northug	Norway
silver medal	Jens Filbrich; Tobias Angerer; Franz Göring; Axel Teichmann	Germany
bronze medal	Matti Heikkinen; Sami Jauhojärvi; Teemu Kattilakoski; Ville Nousiainen	Finland

The men's 4 × 10 kilometre relay was held on 27 February 2009 at 13:00 CET. The defending world champions were the Norwegian team of Eldar Rønning, Odd-Bjørn Hjelmeset, Lars Berger and Petter Northug.

== Results ==
Rank	Bib	Country	Athlete	Time	Deficit
1st place, gold medalist(s)	1	Norway	Eldar Rønning; Odd-Bjørn Hjelmeset; Tore Ruud Hofstad; Petter Northug	1:41:50.6; 26:28.3; 26:12.7; 24:40.7; 24:28.9	—
2nd place, silver medalist(s)	4	Germany	Jens Filbrich; Tobias Angerer; Franz Göring; Axel Teichmann	1:41:53.2; 26:03.4; 26:13.7; 24:50.1; 24:46.0	+2.6
3rd place, bronze medalist(s)	6	Finland	Matti Heikkinen; Sami Jauhojärvi; Teemu Kattilakoski; Ville Nousiainen	1:42:34.5; 26:22.4; 25:55.3; 25:31.2; 24:45.6	+43.9
4	9	Italy	Roland Clara; Valerio Checchi; Pietro Piller Cottrer; Giorgio Di Centa	1:43:13.0; 26:56.5; 27:17.9; 24:29.7; 24:28.9	+1:22.4
5	11	Canada	Devon Kershaw; George Grey; Ivan Babikov; Alex Harvey	1:43:21.9; 26:03.9; 27:26.6; 24:55.3; 24:56.1	+1:31.3
6	3	Sweden	Daniel Rickardsson; Johan Olsson; Mathias Fredriksson; Marcus Hellner	1:44:03.7; 27:13.5; 26:21.5; 25:09.6; 25:19.1	+2:13.1
7	10	Switzerland	Curdin Perl; Dario Cologna; Remo Fischer; Toni Livers	1:44:34.4; 27:19.2; 26:16.2; 25:18.1; 25:40.9	+2:43.8
8	12	Estonia	Jaak Mae; Andrus Veerpalu; Kaspar Kokk; Aivar Rehemaa	1:44:34.4; 26:16.3; 26:14.0; 26:47.7; 25:16.4	+2:43.8
9	5	France	Alexandre Rousselet; Jean-Marc Gaillard; Vincent Vittoz; Emmanuel Jonnier	1:45:00.3; 28:16.2; 27:26.8; 24:55.1; 24:22.2	+3:09.7
10	7	Kazakhstan	Sergey Cherepanov; Alexey Poltoranin; Yevgeniy Velichko; Nikolay Chebotko	1:45:35.4; 27:12.2; 26:49.3; 25:20.4; 26:13.5	+3:44.8
11	8	Czech Republic	Martin Jakš; Lukáš Bauer; Jiří Magál; Martin Koukal	1:46:52.3; 28:24.1; 27:20.9; 25:48.5; 25:18.8	+5:01.7
12	13	United States	Kris Freeman; Chris Cook; James Southam; Andrew Newell	1:47:25.5; 26:20.2; 27:47.6; 26:19.2; 26:58.5	+5:34.9
13	15	Australia	Ben Sim; Callum Watson; Andrew Mock; Mark van der Ploeg	LAP; 29:14.9; 29:55.6; LAP	—
14	14	Great Britain	Andrew Musgrave; Alexander Standen; Andrew Young; Simon James Platt	LAP; 29:03.3; LAP	—
	2	Russia	Sergey Novikov; Vasily Rochev; Alexander Legkov; Yevgeny Dementyev	DSQ	—
