= Mikhail Ivanov (cross-country skier) =

Russian cross-country skier

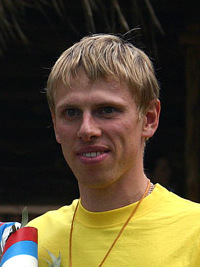
- Ivanov during the 60th birthday party of coach Aleksandr Grushin at the Romantic Country Club in July 2005

Personal information
- Full name: Mikhail Petrovich Ivanov
- Nationality: Russia
- Born: 20 November 1977 (age 48) Ostrov, Russian SFSR, Soviet Union

Sport
- Sport: Skiing

World Cup career
- Seasons: 11 – (1997–2007)
- Indiv. starts: 87
- Indiv. podiums: 4
- Indiv. wins: 2
- Team starts: 25
- Team podiums: 11
- Team wins: 1
- Overall titles: 0 – (15th in 2000, 2001)
- Discipline titles: 0
Medal record
Men's cross-country skiing
Representing Russia
Olympic Games
Gold medal – first place	2002 Salt Lake City	50 km classical
World Championships
Bronze medal – third place	2001 Lahti	30 km classical
Junior World Championships
Gold medal – first place	1996 Asiago	4 × 10 km relay
Silver medal – second place	1995 Gällivare	4 × 10 km relay
Silver medal – second place	1997 Canmore	4 × 10 km relay

Mikhail Petrovich Ivanov (Russian: Михаил Петрович Иванов); born 20 November 1977 in Ostrov, Soviet Union) is a Russian cross-country skier who competed from 1996 to 2007.

== Career ==
He finished second in the 50 km at the 2002 Winter Olympics in Salt Lake City to Spain's Johann Mühlegg, but was awarded the gold medal upon Mühlegg's blood-doping disqualification of darbepoetin alfa.

Ivanov won the bronze medal in the 30 km event at the 2001 FIS Nordic World Ski Championships in Lahti. He also won two World Cup events in his career (30 km: 2000, 15 km: 2001).

== Cross-country skiing results ==
All results are sourced from the International Ski Federation (FIS).

=== Olympic Games ===
- 1 medal – (1 gold)

Year	Age	15 km	Pursuit	30 km	50 km	Sprint	4 × 10 km relay
2002	24	11	—	—	Gold	—	6

=== World Championships ===
- 1 medal – (1 bronze)

Year	Age	10 km	15 km	Pursuit	30 km	50 km	Sprint	4 × 10 km relay	Team sprint
1997	19	49	—N/a	38	—	—	—N/a	—	—N/a
1999	21	9	—N/a	15	—	—	—N/a	7	—N/a
2001	23	—N/a	20	—	Bronze	—	—	4	—N/a
2003	25	—N/a	—	—	17	—	—	—	—N/a
2005	27	—N/a	—	44	—N/a	—	—	—	—

=== World Cup ===
==== Season standings ====
Season	Age	Discipline standings					Ski Tour standings
Season	Age	Overall	Distance	Long Distance	Middle Distance	Sprint	Tour de Ski
1997	19	NC	—N/a	NC	—N/a	—	—N/a
1998	20	NC	—N/a	NC	—N/a	—	—N/a
1999	21	29	—N/a	35	—N/a	55	—N/a
2000	22	15	—N/a	2nd place, silver medalist(s)	34	61	—N/a
2001	23	15	—N/a	—N/a	—N/a	48	—N/a
2002	24	47	—N/a	—N/a	—N/a	NC	—N/a
2003	25	67	—N/a	—N/a	—N/a	—	—N/a
2004	26	45	28	—N/a	—N/a	NC	—N/a
2005	27	63	38	—N/a	—N/a	NC	—N/a
2006	28	161	119	—N/a	—N/a	—	—N/a
2007	29	NC	NC	—N/a	—N/a	—	—

==== Individual podiums ====
- 2 victories – (2 WC)
- 4 podiums – (4 WC)

No.	Season	Date	Location	Race	Level	Place
1	1999–00	4 March 2000	Lahti, Finland	30 km Mass Start C	World Cup	1st
2	1999–00	11 March 2000	Oslo, Norway	50 km Individual C	World Cup	2nd
3	2000–01	20 December 2000	Davos, Switzerland	30 km Individual C	World Cup	2nd
4	2000–01	17 March 2001	Falun, Sweden	15 km Individual C	World Cup	1st

==== Team podiums ====
- 1 victory – (1 RL)
- 11 podiums – (11 RL)

No.	Season	Date	Location	Race	Level	Place	Teammates
1	1998–99	14 March 1999	Falun, Sweden	4 × 10 km Relay C/F	World Cup	3rd	Denisov / Prokurorov / Vilisov
2	1998–99	21 March 1999	Oslo, Norway	4 × 10 km Relay C	World Cup	2nd	Denisov / Prokurorov / Vilisov
3	1999–00	13 January 2000	Nové Město, Czech Republic	4 × 10 km Relay C/F	World Cup	3rd	Denisov / Vilisov / Prokurorov
4	1999–00	27 February 2000	Falun, Sweden	4 × 10 km Relay F	World Cup	2nd	Denisov / Bolshakov / Vilisov
5	1999–00	5 March 2000	Lahti, Finland	4 × 10 km Relay C/F	World Cup	3rd	Denisov / Bolshakov / Vilisov
6	2000–01	9 December 2000	Santa Caterina, Italy	4 × 5 km Relay C/F	World Cup	3rd	Denisov / Bolshakov / Vilisov
7	2000–01	21 March 2001	Lugnet, Falun, Sweden	4 × 10 km Relay C/F	World Cup	1st	Denisov / Bolshakov / Vilisov
8	2001–02	21 November 2001	Kuopio, Finland	4 × 10 km Relay C/F	World Cup	3rd	Rochev / Bolshakov / Vilisov
9	2001–02	16 December 2001	Davos, Switzerland	4 × 10 km Relay C/F	World Cup	2nd	Denisov / Vilisov / Bolshakov
10	2003–04	11 January 2004	Otepää, Estonia	4 × 10 km Relay C/F	World Cup	3rd	Pankratov / Alypov / Vilisov
11	2003–04	7 February 2004	La Clusaz, France	4 × 10 km Relay C/F	World Cup	3rd	Pankratov / Dementyev / Novikov
