= Alexander Penna =

Brazilian cross-country skier (born 1974)

Personal information
- Nationality: Brazilian
- Born: 15 June 1974 (age 50); Philadelphia, Pennsylvania, United States

Sport
- Sport: Cross-country skiing

Alexander Penna (born 15 June 1974) is a Brazilian cross-country skier. He competed in the men's 50 kilometre classical event at the 2002 Winter Olympics.
