= Leanid Karneyenka =

Belarusian cross country skier (born 1987)

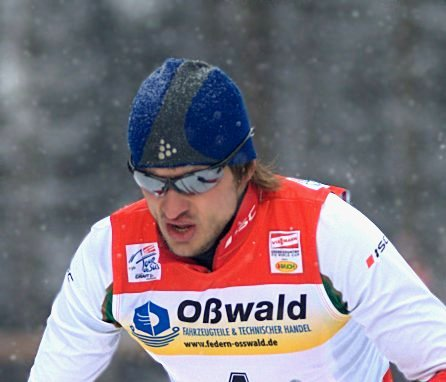
- Karneyenka in 2010.

Medal record

World Championships

Men's cross-country skiing
Silver medal – second place	2007 Sapporo	15 km

Leanid Karneyenka (Belarusian: Леанід Карнеенка, born August 20, 1987) is a Belarusian cross-country skier who has competed since 2005. He became the first Belarusian to win a medal at the FIS Nordic World Ski Championships by winning a silver medal in the men's 15 km. This he achieved at the 2007 World Championships without any prior World Cup experience and with a previous best of 16th from the World Junior Championships in 2006. On the FIS distance ranking, he was placed 647th. However, the low ranking gave him an early start position in the 15 km freestyle, which helped as the late starters had to go through snowy tracks while Karneyenka avoided the snow. Karneyenka was described as "completely unknown" by several media sources, and the feat described as "sensational".

At the 2010 Winter Olympics in Vancouver, he finished 51st in the individual sprint event and 63rd in the 15 km event. He also finished 21st in the 15 km event at the 2010 Winter Military World Games.
