= Jaak Mae =

Estonian cross-country skier

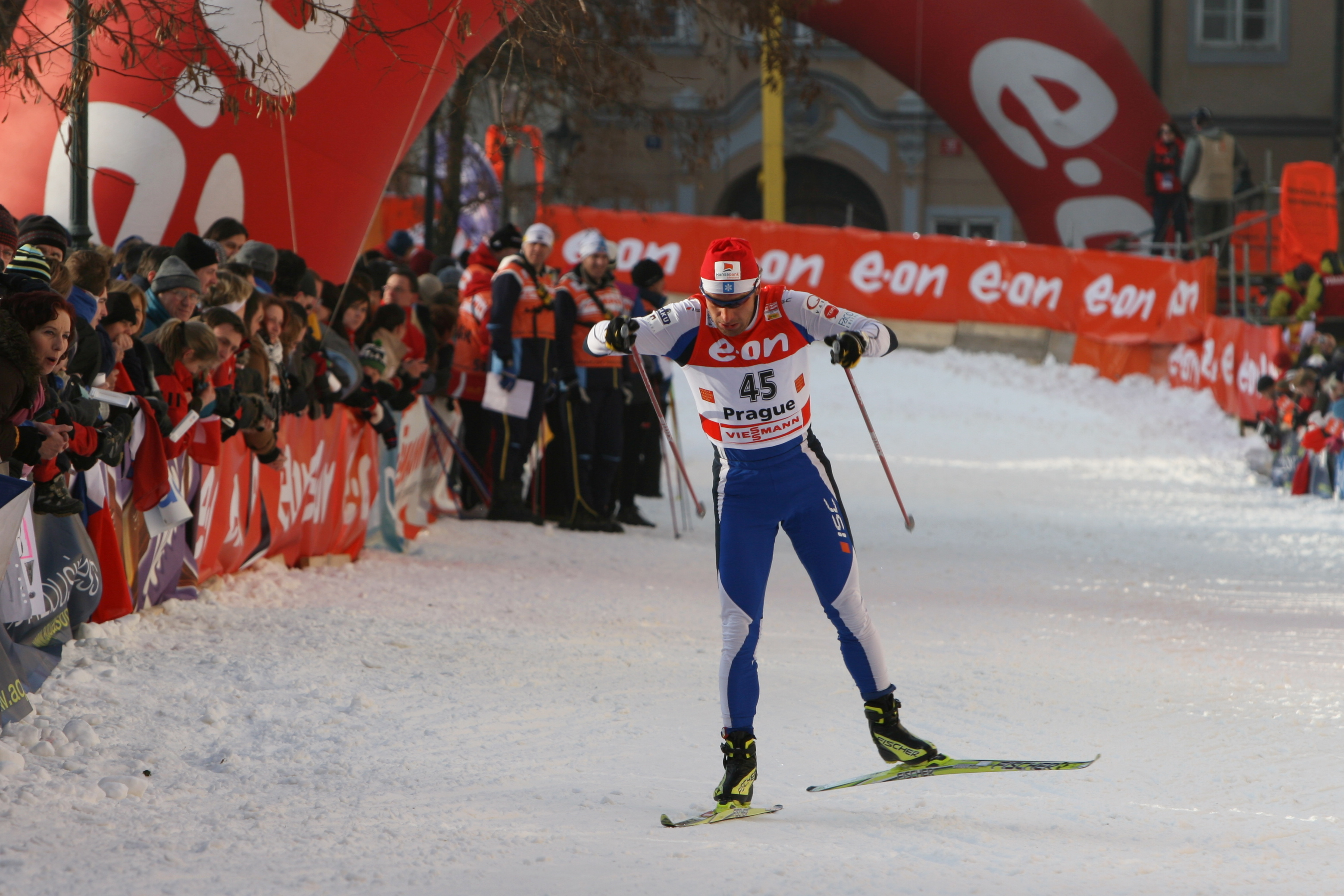
- Jaak Mae in 2007

Personal information
- Nationality: Estonia
- Born: 25 February 1972 (age 54) Tapa, then part of Estonian SSR, Soviet Union

Sport
- Sport: Skiing
- Club: Oti Sportclub

World Cup career
- Seasons: 1993–2011
- Indiv. starts: 180
- Indiv. podiums: 7
- Indiv. wins: 0
- Team starts: 28
- Team podiums: 0
- Overall titles: 0 – (6th in 2002)
- Discipline titles: 0
Medal record
Representing Estonia
Men's cross-country skiing
Olympic Games
Bronze medal – third place	2002 Salt Lake City	15 km classical
World Championships
Silver medal – second place	2003 Val di Fiemme	15 km classical

Jaak Mae (born February 25, 1972) is an Estonian cross-country skier who has competed since 1994. He won a bronze in the 15 km event at the 2002 Winter Olympics in Salt Lake City.

Mae won a silver medal in the 15 km event at the 2003 FIS Nordic World Ski Championships in Val di Fiemme. He also finished fifth at the 2006 Winter Olympics and fifth at the FIS Nordic World Ski Championships 2009.

== Cross-country skiing results ==
All results are sourced from the International Ski Federation (FIS).

=== Olympic Games ===
- 1 medal – (1 bronze)

Year	Age	10 km	15 km	Pursuit	30 km	50 km	Sprint	4 × 10 km relay	Team sprint
1994	22	35	—N/a	40	59	—	—N/a	11	—N/a
1998	26	6	—N/a	15	11	—	—N/a	10	—N/a
2002	30	—N/a	Bronze	8	—	—	—	9	—N/a
2006	34	—N/a	5	—	—N/a	—	—	8	—
2010	38	—N/a	—	—	—N/a	30	—	14	—

=== World Championships ===
- 1 medal – (1 silver)

Year	Age	10 km	15 km	Pursuit	30 km	50 km	Sprint	4 × 10 km relay	Team sprint
1993	21	61	—N/a	63	56	—	—N/a	15	—N/a
1995	23	—	—N/a	—	55	57	—N/a	11	—N/a
1997	25	34	—N/a	33	—	31	—N/a	11	—N/a
1999	27	7	—N/a	5	—	18	—N/a	10	—N/a
2001	29	—N/a	10	12	27	—	—	7	—N/a
2003	31	—N/a	Silver	10	—	—	—	8	—N/a
2005	33	—N/a	—	29	—N/a	32	—	9	—
2007	35	—N/a	67	—	—N/a	8	—	12	—
2009	37	—N/a	5	37	—N/a	—	—	8	—
2011	39	—N/a	14	—	—N/a	—	—	10	—

=== World Cup ===
==== Season standings ====
Season	Age	Discipline standings					Ski Tour standings		
Season	Age	Overall	Distance	Long Distance	Middle Distance	Sprint	Nordic Opening	Tour de Ski	World Cup Final
1993	21	NC	—N/a	—N/a	—N/a	—N/a	—N/a	—N/a	—N/a
1994	22	NC	—N/a	—N/a	—N/a	—N/a	—N/a	—N/a	—N/a
1995	23	NC	—N/a	—N/a	—N/a	—N/a	—N/a	—N/a	—N/a
1996	24	NC	—N/a	—N/a	—N/a	—N/a	—N/a	—N/a	—N/a
1997	25	76	—N/a	NC	—N/a	55	—N/a	—N/a	—N/a
1998	26	61	—N/a	NC	—N/a	50	—N/a	—N/a	—N/a
1999	27	27	—N/a	33	—N/a	69	—N/a	—N/a	—N/a
2000	28	47	—N/a	30	41	65	—N/a	—N/a	—N/a
2001	29	37	—N/a	—N/a	—N/a	—	—N/a	—N/a	—N/a
2002	30	6	—N/a	—N/a	—N/a	—	—N/a	—N/a	—N/a
2003	31	19	—N/a	—N/a	—N/a	—	—N/a	—N/a	—N/a
2004	32	17	14	—N/a	—N/a	—	—N/a	—N/a	—N/a
2005	33	33	18	—N/a	—N/a	—	—N/a	—N/a	—N/a
2006	34	49	32	—N/a	—N/a	NC	—N/a	—N/a	—N/a
2007	35	26	11	—N/a	—N/a	NC	—N/a	35	—N/a
2008	36	52	30	—N/a	—N/a	NC	—N/a	35	28
2009	37	26	23	—N/a	—N/a	NC	—N/a	11	—
2010	38	89	49	—N/a	—N/a	NC	—N/a	—	—
2011	39	101	77	—N/a	—N/a	NC	DNF	27	—

==== Individual podiums ====
- 7 podiums – (7 WC)

No.	Season	Date	Location	Race	Level	Place
1	2001–02	12 January 2002	Nové Město, Czech Republic	10 km Individual F	World Cup	2nd
2	2003–04	17 January 2004	Nové Město, Czech Republic	15 km Individual C	World Cup	3rd
3	2003–04	21 February 2004	Umeå, Sweden	15 km Individual C	World Cup	3rd
4	2003–04	7 March 2004	Lahti, Finland	15 km Individual C	World Cup	2nd
5	2004–05	8 January 2005	Otepää, Estonia	15 km Individual C	World Cup	3rd
6	2007–08	9 February 2008	Otepää, Estonia	15 km Individual C	World Cup	2nd
7	2009–10	16 January 2010	Otepää, Estonia	15 km Individual C	World Cup	3rd
