= Dolinsk =

Dolinsk (Russian: Долинск) is the name of several inhabited localities in Russia.

Urban localities

- Dolinsk, Sakhalin Oblast, a town in Dolinsky District of Sakhalin Oblast

Rural localities

- Dolinsk, Orenburg Oblast, a settlement in Toksky Selsoviet of Krasnogvardeysky District of Orenburg Oblast
