= Ville Nousiainen =

Finnish cross-country skier

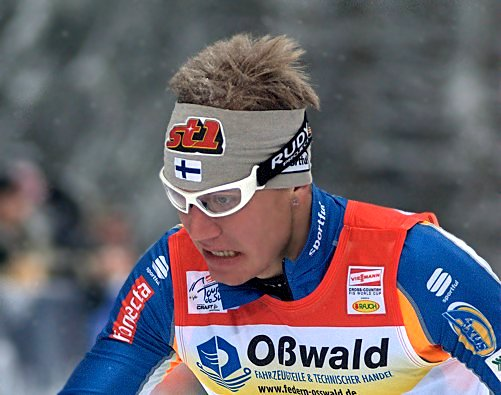
- Ville Nousiainen, Tour de Ski 2010

Personal information
- Full name: Ville Antero Nousiainen
- Nationality: Finland
- Born: 5 December 1983 (age 42) Kouvola, Finland
- Height: 185 cm (6 ft 1 in)
- Spouse: Mona-Liisa Nousiainen (m. 2015; died 2019)

Sport
- Sport: Skiing
- Club: Kouvolan Hiihtoseura

World Cup career
- Seasons: 16 – (2003–2018)
- Indiv. starts: 169
- Indiv. podiums: 2
- Indiv. wins: 0
- Team starts: 19
- Team podiums: 1
- Team wins: 0
- Overall titles: 0 – (17th in 2008)
- Discipline titles: 0
Medal record
Men's cross-country skiing
Representing Finland
World Championships
Bronze medal – third place	2009 Liberec	Team sprint
Bronze medal – third place	2009 Liberec	4 × 10 km relay

Ville Nousiainen (born 5 December 1983, in Kouvola) is a Finnish cross-country skier who has been competing since 2002. He finished fifth in the 4 × 10 km relay at the 2010 Winter Olympics in Vancouver, Canada.

Nousiainen won his first world championship medal, a bronze, in the team sprint event with Sami Jauhojärvi at Liberec in 2009. He then followed it with another bronze in the 4 × 10 km relay at the same championships.

First place victories include two 10 km FIS races and most recently two National Championships in Finland in 2010 (50 km, 19.8 km).

Ville Nousiainen was married to compatriot cross-country skier Mona-Liisa Nousiainen since 2015 until her death in 2019. They have one daughter together.

== Cross-country skiing results ==
All results are sourced from the International Ski Federation (FIS).

=== Olympic Games ===
Year	Age	15 km individual	30 km skiathlon	50 km mass start	Sprint	4 × 10 km relay	Team sprint
2006	22	—	—	DNF	—	—	—
2010	26	13	DNF	37	—	5	10
2014	30	28	—	—	24	—	—

=== World Championships ===
- 2 medals – (2 bronze)

Year	Age	15 km individual	30 km skiathlon	50 km mass start	Sprint	4 × 10 km relay	Team sprint
2007	23	18	24	10	—	6	9
2009	25	DNF	18	25	—	Bronze	Bronze
2011	27	8	—	26	—	4	5
2013	29	26	—	—	—	5	—
2015	31	22	—	—	—	8	5
2017	33	—	38	—	—	—	—

=== World Cup ===
==== Season standings ====
Season	Age	Discipline standings			Ski Tour standings			
Season	Age	Overall	Distance	Sprint	Nordic Opening	Tour de Ski	World Cup Final	Ski Tour Canada
2003	19	NC	—N/a	—	—N/a	—N/a	—N/a	—N/a
2004	20	NC	NC	—	—N/a	—N/a	—N/a	—N/a
2005	21	NC	NC	—	—N/a	—N/a	—N/a	—N/a
2006	22	153	111	—	—N/a	—N/a	—N/a	—N/a
2007	23	44	31	NC	—N/a	23	—N/a	—N/a
2008	24	17	10	55	—N/a	19	10	—N/a
2009	25	139	86	NC	—N/a	—	—	—N/a
2010	26	37	36	58	—N/a	23	14	—N/a
2011	27	58	42	52	34	DNF	—	—N/a
2012	28	83	60	94	44	28	—	—N/a
2013	29	NC	NC	NC	DNF	—	—	—N/a
2014	30	47	39	69	31	13	27	—N/a
2015	31	77	53	84	23	DNF	—N/a	—N/a
2016	32	151	96	NC	36	DNF	—N/a	—
2017	33	139	96	—	—	—	—	—N/a
2018	34	150	98	NC	DNF	—	—	—N/a

==== Individual podiums ====
- 2 podiums

No.	Season	Date	Location	Race	Level	Place
1	2007–08	15 December 2007	Rybinsk, Russia	30 km Mass Start F	World Cup	2nd
2	2007–08	9 February 2008	Otepää, Estonia	15 km Individual C	World Cup	3rd

==== Team podiums ====
- 1 podium

No.	Season	Date	Location	Race	Level	Place	Teammate
1	2007–08	17 February 2008	Liberec, Czech Republic	6 × 1.4 km Team Sprint C	World Cup	2nd	Jauhojärvi
