= Nikolay Pankratov =

Russian cross-country skier

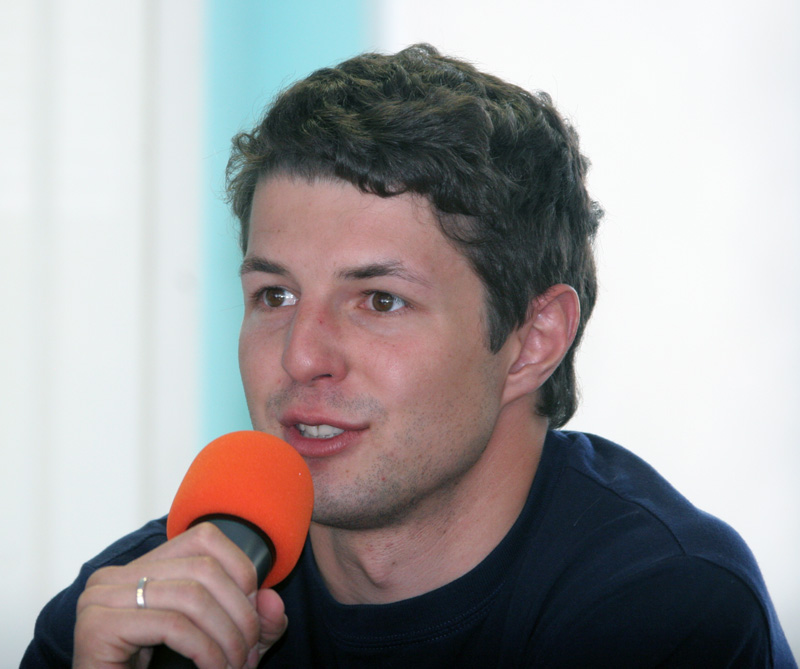
- Nikolay Pankratov in 2008

Personal information
- Nationality: Russia
- Born: 23 December 1982 (age 43) Sverdlovsk, Soviet Union

Sport
- Sport: Skiing

World Cup career
- Seasons: 8 – (2003–2010)
- Indiv. starts: 113
- Indiv. podiums: 4
- Indiv. wins: 1
- Team starts: 16
- Team podiums: 9
- Team wins: 2
- Overall titles: 0 – (16th in 2007)
- Discipline titles: 0
Medal record
Men's cross-country skiing
Representing Russia
World Championships
Silver medal – second place	2007 Sapporo	4 × 10 km relay
Bronze medal – third place	2005 Oberstdorf	4 × 10 km relay
Junior World Championships
Gold medal – first place	2001 Karpacz	4 × 10 km relay

Nikolay Vladimirovich Pankratov (Russian: Николай Владимирович Панкратов; born 23 December 1982 in Sverdlovsk) is a Russian cross-country skier who competed between 1999 and 2013. He won two medals in the 4 × 10 km at the FIS Nordic World Ski Championships with a silver in 2007 and a bronze in 2005, and finished 10th in the 15 km + 15 km double pursuit at the 2005 championships in Oberstdorf.

Pankratov also finished eighth in the 4 × 10 km event at the 2010 Winter Olympics in Vancouver. His only individual win was in a 10 km event in Italy in 2003.

In 2010, Pankratov was allegedly caught with the forbidden substance actovegin when crossing the border to Switzerland.

== Cross-country skiing results ==
All results are sourced from the International Ski Federation (FIS).

=== Olympic Games ===
Year	Age	15 km individual	30 km skiathlon	50 km mass start	Sprint	4 × 10 km relay	Team sprint
2006	23	—	—	18	—	—	—
2010	27	—	32	—	—	8	—

=== World Championships ===
- 2 medals – (1 silver, 1 bronze)

Year	Age	15 km individual	30 km skiathlon	50 km mass start	Sprint	4 × 10 km relay	Team sprint
2005	22	—	10	29	—	Bronze	—
2007	24	36	—	9	—	Silver	—

=== World Cup ===
Season	Age	Discipline standings			Ski Tour standings		
Season	Age	Overall	Distance	Sprint	Nordic Opening	Tour de Ski	World Cup Final
2003	20	114	—N/a	—	—N/a	—N/a	—N/a
2004	21	20	18	37	—N/a	—N/a	—N/a
2005	22	38	25	42	—N/a	—N/a	—N/a
2006	23	53	46	43	—N/a	—N/a	—N/a
2007	24	16	33	21	—N/a	10	—N/a
2008	25	24	14	108	—N/a	18	35
2009	26	93	57	NC	—N/a	31	41
2010	27	45	46	35	—N/a	DNF	23

==== Individual podiums ====
- 1 victory – (1 SWC)
- 4 podiums – (3 WC, 1 SWC)

No.	Season	Date	Location	Race	Level	Place
1	2003–04	13 December 2003	Davos, Switzerland	15 km Individual C	World Cup	2nd
2	2006–07	21 January 2007	Rybinsk, Russia	1.2 km Sprint F	World Cup	2nd
3	2007–08	2 January 2008	Nové Město, Czech Republic	15 km Individual C	Stage World Cup	3rd
4	2007–08	22 January 2008	Canmore, Canada	15 km + 15 km Pursuit C/F	World Cup	1st

==== Team podiums ====
- 2 victories – (1 RL, 1 TS)
- 9 podiums – (7 RL, 2 TS)

No.	Season	Date	Location	Race	Level	Place	Teammate(s)
1	2003–04	11 January 2004	Otepää, Estonia	4 × 10 km Relay C/F	World Cup	3rd	Ivanov / Alypov / Vilisov
2	2003–04	7 February 2004	La Clusaz, France	4 × 10 km Relay C/F	World Cup	3rd	Ivanov / Dementyev / Novikov
3	2003–04	6 March 2004	Lahti, Finland	6 × 1.0 km Team Sprint C	World Cup	1st	Rochev
4	2004–05	15 December 2004	Asiago, Italy	6 × 1.2 km Team Sprint C	World Cup	2nd	Rochev
5	2006–07	19 November 2006	Gällivare, Sweden	4 × 10 km Relay C/F	World Cup	2nd	Rochev / Legkov / Dementyev
6	2006–07	17 December 2006	La Clusaz, France	4 × 10 km Relay C/F	World Cup	1st	Rochev / Legkov / Dementyev
7	2006–07	25 March 2007	Falun, Sweden	4 × 10 km Relay C/F	World Cup	3rd	Rochev / Legkov / Vylegzhanin
8	2007–08	25 November 2007	Beitostølen, Norway	4 × 10 km Relay C/F	World Cup	3rd	Rochev / Legkov / Dementyev
9	2009–10	22 November 2009	Beitostølen, Norway	4 × 10 km Relay C/F	World Cup	2nd	Vylegzhanin / Legkov / Chernousov
