= Ivan Babikov =

Russian cross-country skier

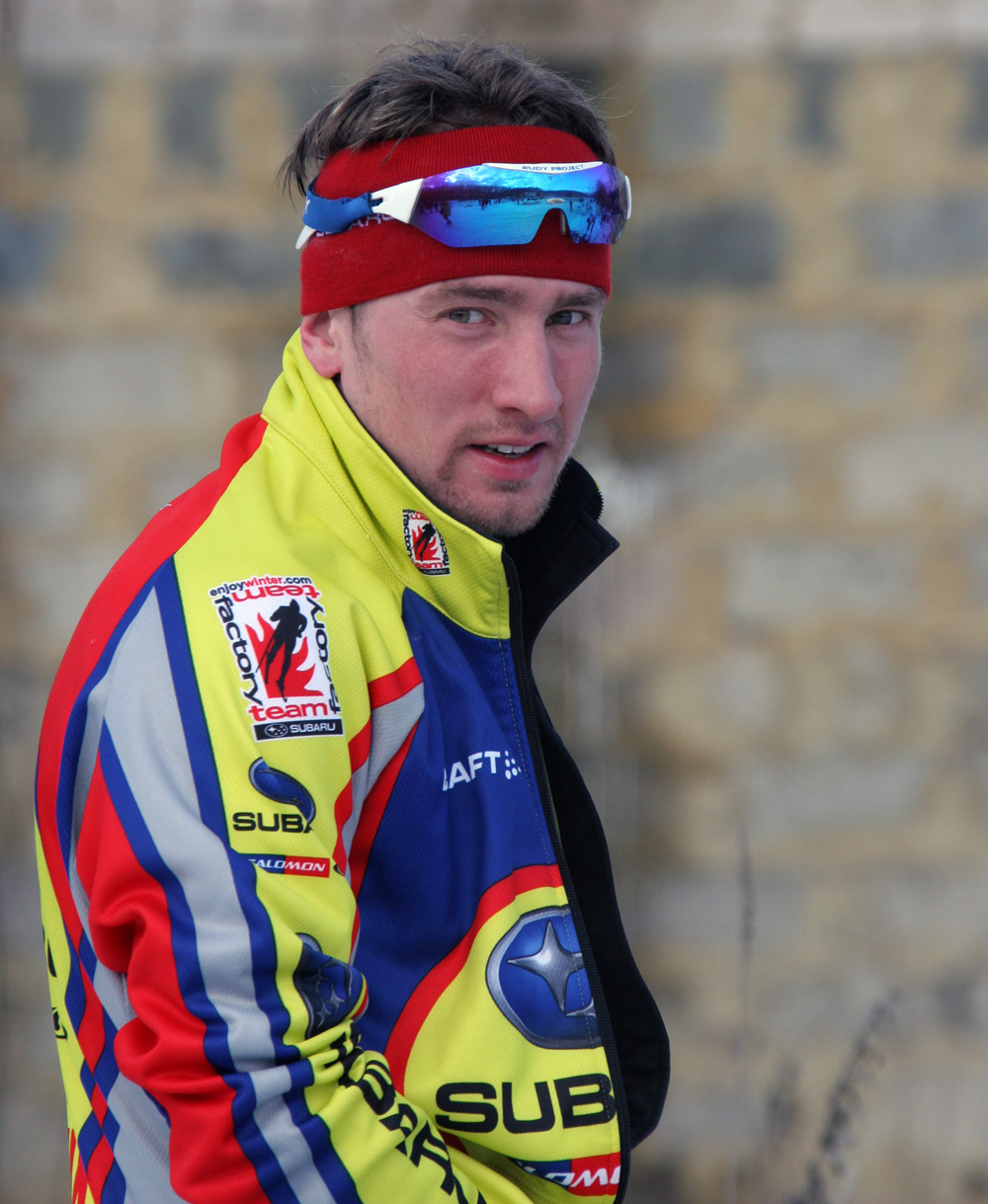
- Babikov in 2008

Personal information
- Nationality: Canada
- Born: July 4, 1980 (age 46) Syktyvkar, Komi ASSR, Russian SFSR, Soviet Union

Sport
- Sport: Skiing
- Club: Foothills Nordic Ski Club

World Cup career
- Seasons: 11 – (2006–2016)
- Indiv. starts: 164
- Indiv. podiums: 3
- Indiv. wins: 1
- Team starts: 11
- Team podiums: 1
- Team wins: 1
- Overall titles: 0 – (20th in 2013)
- Discipline titles: 0

Ivan Sergeyevich Babikov (Russian: Иван Сергеевич Бабиков; born July 4, 1980) is a Russian-born Canadian cross-country skier who competed between 2002 and 2016. At the 2010 Winter Olympics in Whistler, he earned his best finish of fifth in the 15 km + 15 km double pursuit, and was fourth in 2013 World Championship 15 km freestyle, representing Canada.

He was raised in Kozhva, Pechora District, Komi Republic and studied at Syktyvkar State University Sport faculty (1997–2004).

== Skiing ==
Babikov immigrated to Canada in the spring of 2003, as he and his mother joined his sister, who had moved to this country in 1998, in the Toronto area. Initially, Babikov had no intentions of skiing after his career had stalled in Russia. But that fall he moved to Canmore and began competing with the Canadian team, but with a Russian license from the International Skiing Federation (FIS). Without Canadian citizenship, however, he chose to return to Russia and was selected to compete for that country at the 2006 Olympic Winter Games. He continued to compete for Russia in 2006-07 after a bid to fast-track his Canadian citizenship was unsuccessful.

By this time, Babikov was determined to make his home in Canada, especially after his mother was granted her citizenship. Midway through the 2007-08 season, Babikov also officially became Canadian and began representing the maple leaf internationally in 2008-09. In January 2009 he finished first in the final stage of the Tour de Ski, becoming just the second Canadian man (and still just one of four) to win a World Cup race. It was the first World Cup victory by a Canadian man since Pierre Harvey in March 1988.

Babikov was part of the home team at Vancouver 2010, where the men’s cross-country team posted several unprecedented results. In the event now known as the 30 km skiathlon, Babikov placed a Canadian best-ever fifth in a race in which three Canadians were in the top-10. He also finished a best-ever eighth in the 15 km freestyle race and helped the 4 × 10 km relay team to a seventh place finish.

Babikov has 33 individual career victories up to 50 km at lesser events from 2003 to 2006.

He competed in 2006 Winter Olympics for Russia (he was 13th in 30 km skiathlon) and in the 2010 Winter Olympics in Vancouver, Canada, finishing seventh in the 4 × 10 km relay. In Vancouver he showed his best personal Olympic results: He was fifth in the skiathlon and eighth in 15 km freestyle.

He announced his retirement from cross-country skiing in June, 2016 and joined the coaching staff of the Canadian National Cross-Country Ski Team.

== Change of nationality ==
Babikov lived in Canada in spring 2003 on a sponsorship, and got his Canadian citizenship in December 2007. In 2008, he still had to ski for Russia, according to rules about the licenses from International Ski Federation. He officially became a Canadian ski competitor in January 2009. Now he lives in Alberta.

== Cross-country skiing results ==
All results are sourced from the International Ski Federation (FIS).

=== Olympic Games ===
Year	Age	15 km individual	30 km skiathlon	50 km mass start	Sprint	4 × 10 km relay	Team sprint
2006	26	22	13	38	—	—	—
2010	30	8	5	33	—	7	—
2014	34	39	24	20	—	12	—

=== World Championships ===
Year	Age	15 km individual	30 km skiathlon	50 km mass start	Sprint	4 × 10 km relay	Team sprint
2007	27	—	—	45	—	—	—
2009	29	—	40	16	—	5	—
2011	31	30	15	17	—	12	—
2013	33	4	31	DNF	—	12	—
2015	35	20	23	30	—	10	—

=== World Cup ===
==== Season standings ====
Season	Age	Discipline standings			Ski Tour standings			
Season	Age	Overall	Distance	Sprint	Nordic Opening	Tour de Ski	World Cup Final	Ski Tour Canada
2006	26	45	29	—	—N/a	—N/a	—N/a	—N/a
2007	27	136	83	—	—N/a	—	—N/a	—N/a
2008	28	84	53	—	—N/a	—	—	—N/a
2009	29	46	25	NC	—N/a	35	33	—N/a
2010	30	23	27	NC	—N/a	9	17	—N/a
2011	31	42	33	NC	41	21	16	—N/a
2012	32	52	34	NC	46	27	—	—N/a
2013	33	20	20	NC	25	7	41	—N/a
2014	34	40	30	NC	36	15	23	—N/a
2015	35	67	43	NC	28	30	—N/a	—N/a
2016	36	38	32	NC	50	29	—N/a	14

==== Individual podiums ====
- 1 victory – (1 SWC)
- 3 podiums – (3 SWC)

No.	Season	Date	Location	Race	Level	Place
1	2008–09	4 January 2009	Val di Fiemme, Italy	10 km Pursuit F	Stage World Cup	1st
2	2012–13	6 January 2013	Val di Fiemme, Italy	9 km Pursuit F	Stage World Cup	2nd
3	2013–14	5 January 2014	Val di Fiemme, Italy	9 km Pursuit F	Stage World Cup	3rd

==== Team podiums ====
- 1 victory – (1 RL)
- 1 podium – (1 RL)

No.	Season	Date	Location	Race	Level	Place	Teammates
1	2006–07	4 February 2007	Davos, Switzerland	4 × 10 km Relay C/F	World Cup	1st	Novikov / Chernousov / Shiryayev
