= Toni Livers =

Swiss cross-country skier

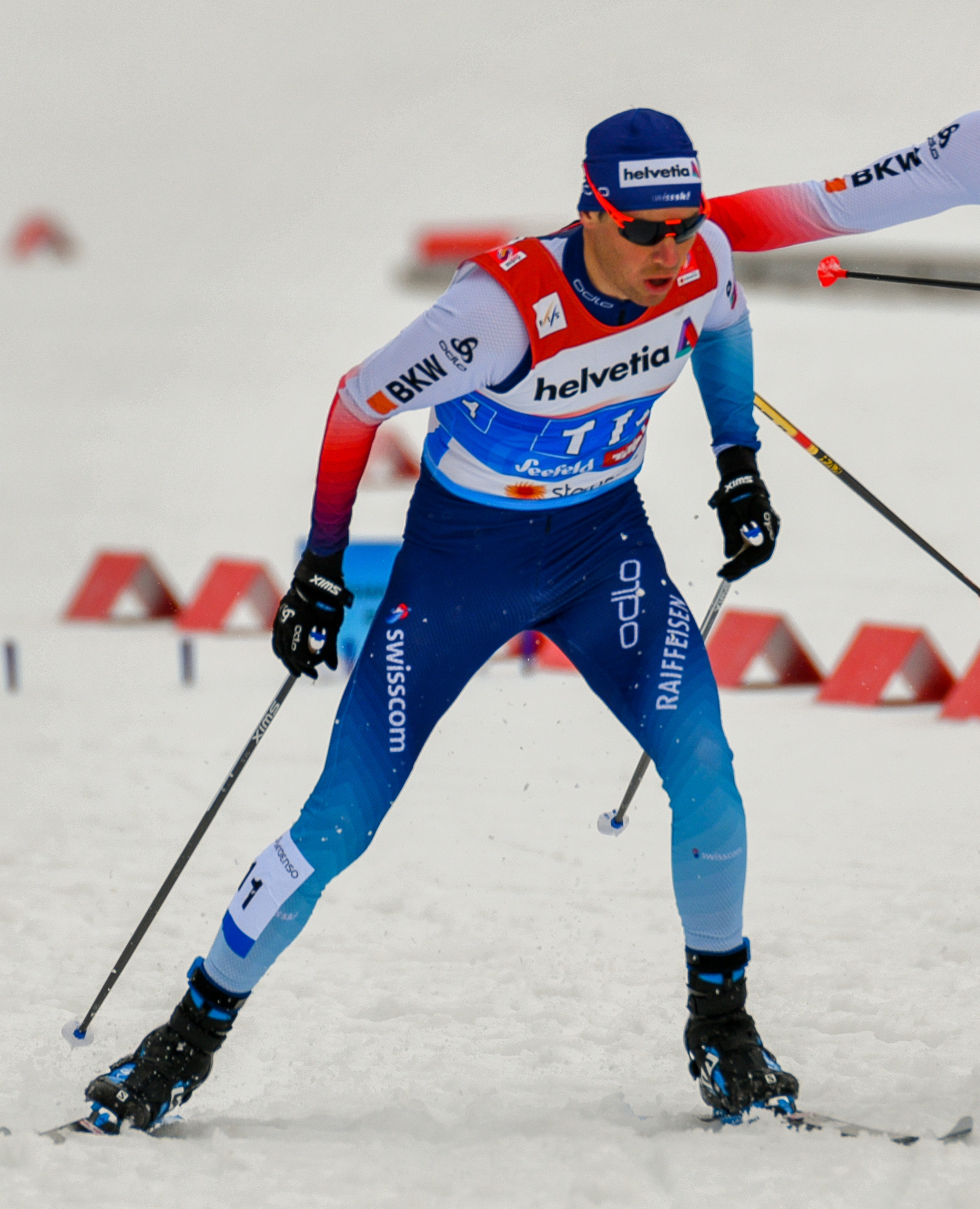

Personal information
- Nationality: Switzerland
- Born: 2 June 1983 (age 43) Trun, Switzerland

Sport
- Sport: Skiing
- Club: Gardes Frontières

World Cup career
- Seasons: 17 – (2004–2020)
- Indiv. starts: 183
- Indiv. podiums: 2
- Indiv. wins: 1
- Team starts: 22
- Team podiums: 1
- Team wins: 0
- Overall titles: 0 – (30th in 2015)
- Discipline titles: 0

Toni Livers (born 2 June 1983 in Trun) is a Swiss former cross-country skier. Livers began competing in 2000 and competed in the World Cup from 2003 to 2020. His best individual finish at the FIS Nordic World Ski Championships was ninth in the 15 km + 15 km double pursuit at Sapporo in 2007.

Livers' best finish at the Winter Olympics was tenth in the 4 x 10 km relay at Vancouver in 2010.

His only World Cup victory occurred in the 15 km event in Davos, Switzerland, on 3 February 2007. He finished third at the 9 km Final Climb event at the 2014–15 Tour de Ski. Livers also has seven individual victories in lesser events from 2002 to 2005. He retired after the 2019–20 season.

== Cross-country skiing results ==
All results are sourced from the International Ski Federation (FIS).

=== Olympic Games ===
Year	Age	15 km individual	30 km skiathlon	50 km mass start	Sprint	4 × 10 km relay	Team sprint
2006	22	—	40	32	—	7	—
2010	26	12	22	—	—	10	—
2014	30	—	—	30	—	7	—
2018	34	34	40	—	—	11	—

=== World Championships ===
Year	Age	15 km individual	30 km skiathlon	50 km mass start	Sprint	4 × 10 km relay	Team sprint
2005	21	21	—	—	—	—	—
2007	23	37	9	—	—	10	—
2009	25	26	38	14	—	7	—
2011	27	—	54	55	—	9	—
2013	29	16	—	—	—	6	—
2015	31	15	—	—	—	5	—
2017	33	—	—	37	—	—	—
2019	35	—	DNS	24	—	8	—

=== World Cup ===
==== Season standings ====
Season	Age	Discipline standings			Ski Tour standings				
Season	Age	Overall	Distance	Sprint	Nordic Opening	Tour de Ski	Ski Tour 2020	World Cup Final	Ski Tour Canada
2004	20	NC	NC	—	—N/a	—N/a	—N/a	—N/a	—N/a
2005	21	NC	NC	—	—N/a	—N/a	—N/a	—N/a	—N/a
2006	22	118	79	—	—N/a	—N/a	—N/a	—N/a	—N/a
2007	23	43	23	NC	—N/a	47	—N/a	—N/a	—N/a
2008	24	55	33	105	—N/a	—	—N/a	32	—N/a
2009	25	34	30	NC	—N/a	14	—N/a	42	—N/a
2010	26	63	33	NC	—N/a	—	—N/a	—	—N/a
2011	27	93	62	NC	26	DNF	—N/a	—	—N/a
2012	28	120	75	NC	DNF	DNF	—N/a	—	—N/a
2013	29	134	85	NC	52	50	—N/a	—	—N/a
2014	30	99	59	NC	32	31	—N/a	—	—N/a
2015	31	30	31	NC	31	12	—N/a	—N/a	—N/a
2016	32	44	28	NC	—	23	—N/a	—N/a	—
2017	33	36	28	NC	54	20	—N/a	—	—N/a
2018	34	57	45	NC	—	22	—N/a	—	—N/a
2019	35	93	60	NC	42	31	—N/a	—	—N/a
2020	36	NC	NC	NC	—	DNF	—	—N/a	—N/a

==== Individual podiums ====
- 1 victory – (1 WC)
- 2 podiums – (1 WC, 1 SWC)

No.	Season	Date	Location	Race	Level	Place
1	2006–07	3 February 2007	Davos, Switzerland	15 km Individual F	World Cup	1st
2	2014–15	11 January 2015	Val di Fiemme, Italy	9 km Pursuit F	Stage World Cup	3rd

==== Team podiums ====
- 1 victory – (1 RL)
- 1 podium – (1 RL)

No.	Season	Date	Location	Race	Level	Place	Teammates
1	2010–11	19 December 2010	La Clusaz, France	4 × 10 km Relay C/F	World Cup	1st	Cologna / Fischer / Perl
