= Sami Jauhojärvi =

Finnish cross-country skier

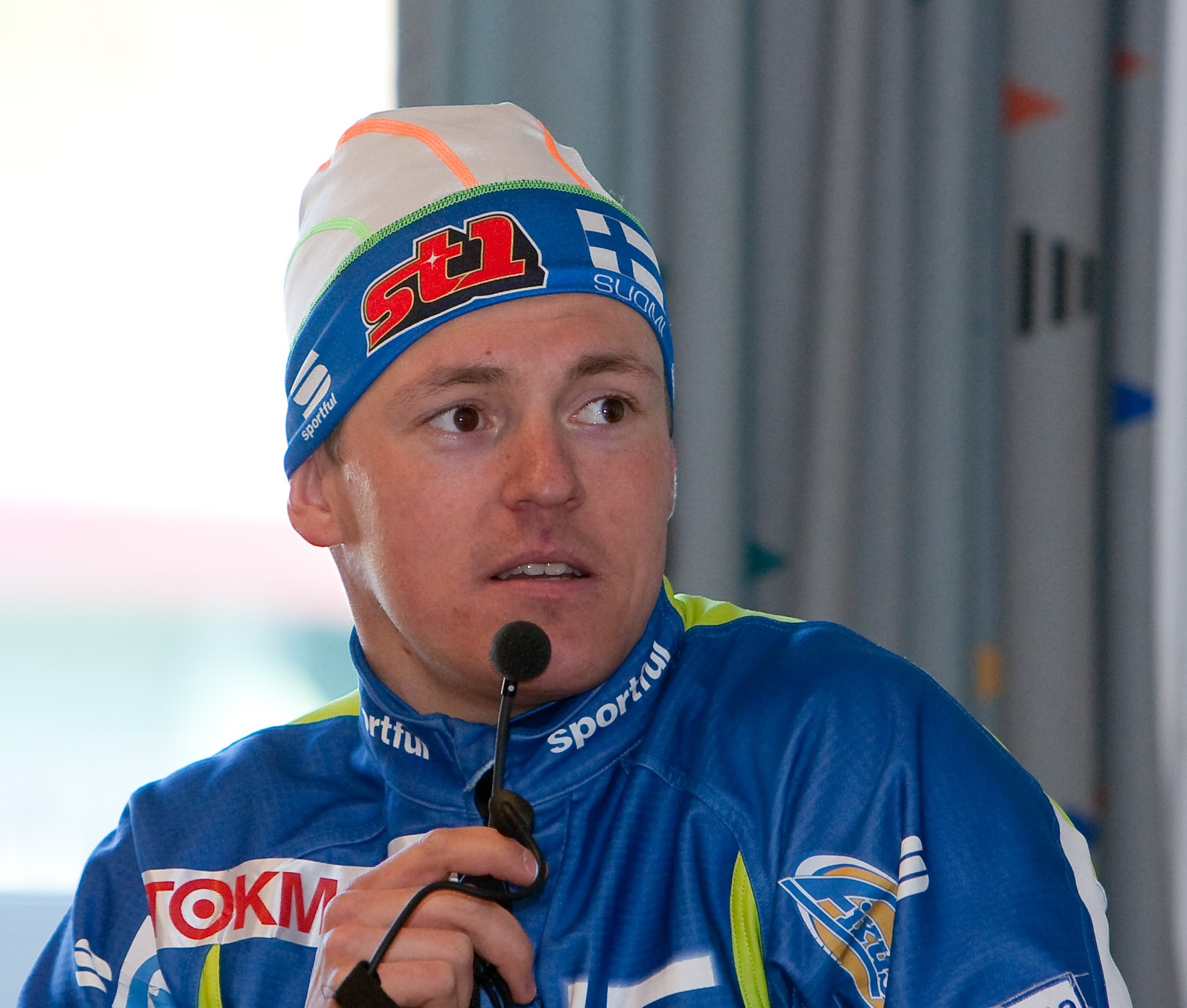
- Jauhojärvi in 2009

Personal information
- Full name: Sami Olavi Jauhojärvi
- Nationality: Finland
- Born: 5 May 1981 (age 45) Ylitornio, Finland
- Height: 1.74 m (5 ft 9 in)

Sport
- Sport: Skiing
- Club: Vuokatti Ski Team Kainuu

World Cup career
- Seasons: 17 – (2001–2017)
- Indiv. starts: 213
- Indiv. podiums: 9
- Indiv. wins: 1
- Team starts: 32
- Team podiums: 2
- Team wins: 0
- Overall titles: 0 – (4th in 2009)
- Discipline titles: 0
Medal record
Men's cross-country skiing
Representing Finland
Olympic Games
Gold medal – first place	2014 Sochi	Team sprint
World Championships
Bronze medal – third place	2009 Liberec	Team sprint
Bronze medal – third place	2009 Liberec	4 × 10 km relay
Bronze medal – third place	2017 Lahti	Team sprint
U23 World Championships
Silver medal – second place	2002 Val di Fiemme	30 km freestyle
Junior World Championships
Gold medal – first place	2001 Karpacz	30 km freestyle
Silver medal – second place	2001 Karpacz	4 × 10 km relay
Bronze medal – third place	2001 Karpacz	10 km classical

Sami Jauhojärvi (born 5 May 1981) is a Finnish former cross-country skier who competed between 2000 and 2017. At the 2014 Winter Olympics, he won men's team sprint with Iivo Niskanen. Germany launched a protest over the result due to a final-leg collision between Jauhojärvi and Tim Tscharnke, but it was rejected by the jury. Jauhojärvi's Finland finished fifth in the 4 x 10 km relay in Vancouver in 2010.

Jauhojärvi won his first medal at the FIS Nordic World Ski Championships 2009 in Liberec with a bronze in the team sprint with Ville Nousiainen, and then added a second in the 4 × 10 km relay. Jauhojärvi has won one World Cup race; in Trondheim 2009 he won the 50 km classic mass start competition.

He was the 2001 Junior World Ski Champion in the 30 km freestyle at Karpacz.

== Cross-country skiing results ==
All results are sourced from the International Ski Federation (FIS).

=== Olympic Games ===
- 1 medal – (1 gold)

Year	Age	15 km individual	30 km skiathlon	50 km mass start	Sprint	4 × 10 km relay	Team sprint
2006	24	9	20	—	61	10	—
2010	28	—	DNF	20	12	5	—
2014	32	17	32	—	—	6	Gold

=== World Championships ===
- 3 medals – (3 bronze)

Year	Age	15 km	Pursuit	30 km	50 km	Sprint	4 × 10 km relay	Team sprint
2001	19	—	—	—	—	18	—	—N/a
2005	23	44	11	—N/a	14	—	12	—
2007	25	—	16	—N/a	13	—	6	9
2009	27	12	8	—N/a	—	—	Bronze	Bronze
2011	29	5	—	—N/a	—	—	4	5
2013	31	—	53	—N/a	30	—	5	—
2015	32	—	34	—N/a	29	—	8	—
2017	34	8	—	—N/a	—	—	5	Bronze

=== World Cup ===
==== Season standings ====
Season	Age	Discipline standings			Ski Tour standings			
Season	Age	Overall	Distance	Sprint	Nordic Opening	Tour de Ski	World Cup Final	Ski Tour Canada
2001	19	NC	—N/a	—	—N/a	—N/a	—N/a	—N/a
2002	20	NC	—N/a	—	—N/a	—N/a	—N/a	—N/a
2003	21	132	—N/a	NC	—N/a	—N/a	—N/a	—N/a
2004	22	138	103	70	—N/a	—N/a	—N/a	—N/a
2005	23	117	76	—	—N/a	—N/a	—N/a	—N/a
2006	24	44	34	50	—N/a	—N/a	—N/a	—N/a
2007	25	9	14	29	—N/a	7	—N/a	—N/a
2008	26	20	13	27	—N/a	34	5	—N/a
2009	27	4	4	19	—N/a	9	11	—N/a
2010	28	58	40	56	—N/a	DNF	—	—N/a
2011	29	30	27	32	24	DNF	29	—N/a
2012	30	40	36	30	26	33	—	—N/a
2013	31	82	75	61	41	—	—	—N/a
2014	32	34	26	64	46	18	19	—N/a
2015	33	35	24	63	—	—	—N/a	—N/a
2016	34	102	66	83	33	36	—N/a	—
2017	35	56	38	99	32	—	16	—N/a

==== Individual podiums ====
- 1 victory – (1 WC)
- 9 podiums – (6 WC, 3 SWC)

No.	Season	Date	Location	Race	Level	Place
1	2006–07	6 January 2007	Cavalese, Italy	30 km Mass Start C	Stage World Cup	3rd
2	2007–08	8 December 2007	Davos, Switzerland	15 km Individual C	World Cup	3rd
3	2008–09	30 November 2008	Rukatunturi, Finland	15 km Individual C	World Cup	3rd
4	2008–09	13 December 2008	Davos, Switzerland	15 km Individual C	World Cup	3rd
5	2008–09	3 February 2009	Val di Fiemme, Italy	20 km Mass Start C	Stage World Cup	2nd
6	2008–09	14 March 2009	Trondheim, Norway	50 km Mass Start C	World Cup	1st
7	2010–11	26 November 2010	Rukatunturi, Finland	1.4 km Sprint C	Stage World Cup	3rd
8	2014–15	30 November 2014	Rukatunturi, Finland	15 km Individual C	World Cup	3rd
9	2014–15	8 March 2015	Lahti, Finland	15 km Individual C	World Cup	3rd

==== Team podiums ====
- 2 podiums – (1 RL, 1 TS)

No.	Season	Date	Location	Race	Level	Place	Teammate(s)
1	2002–03	1 December 2002	Rukatunturi, Finland	2 × 5 km / 2 × 10 km Relay C/F	World Cup	2nd	Välimaa / Taipale / Lassila
2	2007–08	17 February 2008	Liberec, Czech Republic	6 × 1.4 km Team Sprint F	World Cup	2nd	Nousiainen

== Awards ==
- Finnish Sports Personality of the Year: 2014 (shared with Iivo Niskanen)
