= Yevgeny Dementyev =

Russian cross-country skier

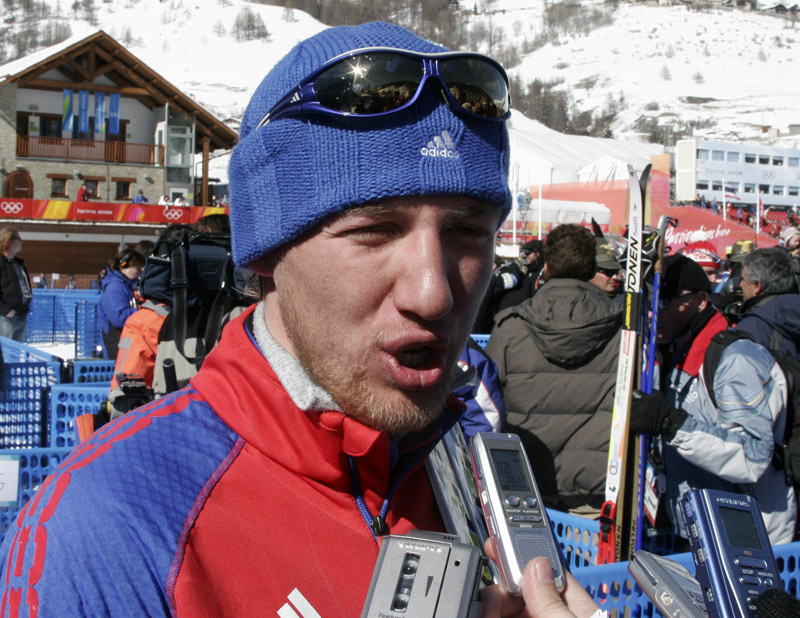
- Yevgeny Dementyev in 2006

Personal information
- Nationality: Russia
- Born: 17 January 1983 (age 43) Tayozhny, Soviet Union

Sport
- Sport: Skiing

World Cup career
- Seasons: 11 – (2003–2009, 2012–2013, 2015, 2017)
- Indiv. starts: 105
- Indiv. podiums: 5
- Indiv. wins: 1
- Team starts: 16
- Team podiums: 4
- Team wins: 1
- Overall titles: 0 – (9th in 2005)
- Discipline titles: 0
Medal record
Men's cross-country skiing
Representing Russia
Olympic Games
Gold medal – first place	2006 Turin	30 km double pursuit
Silver medal – second place	2006 Turin	50 km freestyle
World Championships
Silver medal – second place	2007 Sapporo	4 × 10 km relay
Bronze medal – third place	2005 Oberstdorf	4 × 10 km relay
Junior World Championships
Gold medal – first place	2001 Karpacz	4 × 10 km relay
Gold medal – first place	2003 Sollefteå	10 km classical
Gold medal – first place	2003 Sollefteå	4 × 10 km relay
Bronze medal – third place	2003 Sollefteå	30 km freestyle

Yevgeny Alexandrovich Dementyev (Russian: Евге́ний Александрович Деме́нтьев; born 17 January 1983) is a Russian cross-country skier. He attended Children and Youth Sports School of Sovetsky District, Khanty–Mansi Autonomous Okrug, where his first trainer was Valery Ukhov. Dementyev's first international success was in 2001 at the Junior World Championship. He won two medals at the 2006 Winter Olympics in Turin, with a gold in the men's 15 km + 15 km pursuit event and a silver in the men's 50 km freestyle mass start.

Dementyev finished 0.8 seconds behind the winner Giorgio Di Centa in the 50 km event, the closest margin of victory in Olympic history of this event. This margin of victory eclipsed the previous record of 4.9 seconds set at the 1984 Winter Olympics in Sarajevo between fellow Swedes Thomas Wassberg and Gunde Svan.

He also won two medals at the 2003 Nordic skiing World Junior Championships with a gold in 10 km and a bronze in the 30 km. Dementyev has two 4 × 10 km medals at the FIS Nordic World Ski Championships with a silver in 2007 and a bronze in 2005. His best individual finish at the FIS Nordic World Ski Championships was 22nd in the 15 km + 15 km double pursuit in 2005.

On 25 August 2009, Dementyev tested positive for recombinant erythropoietin. He returned in 2011 after a two-year ban but retired shortly thereafter.

== Cross-country skiing results ==
All results are sourced from the International Ski Federation (FIS).

=== Olympic Games ===
- 2 medals – (1 gold, 1 silver)

Year	Age	15 km individual	30 km skiathlon	50 km mass start	Sprint	4 × 10 km relay	Team sprint
2006	23	—	Gold	Silver	—	6	—

=== World Championships ===
- 2 medals – (1 silver, 1 bronze)

Year	Age	15 km individual	30 km skiathlon	50 km mass start	Sprint	4 × 10 km relay	Team sprint
2005	22	23	22	—	—	Bronze	—
2007	24	22	—	—	—	Silver	—
2009	26	—	—	DSQ	—	DSQ	—

=== World Cup ===
==== Season standings ====
Season	Age	Discipline standings			Ski Tour standings		
Season	Age	Overall	Distance	Sprint	Nordic Opening	Tour de Ski	World Cup Final
2003	20	90	—N/a	—	—N/a	—N/a	—N/a
2004	21	33	23	NC	—N/a	—N/a	—N/a
2005	22	9	6	NC	—N/a	—N/a	—N/a
2006	23	38	25	NC	—N/a	—N/a	—N/a
2007	24	13	13	NC	—N/a	8	—N/a
2008	25	29	31	93	—N/a	9	30
2009	26	67	48	69	—N/a	DSQ	DSQ
2012	29	65	41	—	—	—	—
2013	30	134	85	—	—	—	—
2015	32	87	51	—	—	—	—N/a
2017	34	109	88	NC	25	—	—

==== Individual podiums ====
- 1 victory – (1 WC)
- 5 podiums – (5 WC)

No.	Season	Date	Location	Race	Level	Place
1	2003–04	21 February 2004	Umeå, Sweden	15 km Individual C	World Cup	2nd
2	2004–05	19 March 2005	Falun, Sweden	15 km + 15 km Skiathlon C/F	World Cup	1st
3	2005–06	14 January 2006	Lago di Tesero, Italy	30 km Mass Start F	World Cup	2nd
4	2006–07	13 December 2006	Cogne, Italy	15 km Individual C	World Cup	3rd
5	2006–07	16 December 2006	La Clusaz, France	30 km Mass Start F	World Cup	3rd

==== Team podiums ====
- 1 victory – (1 RL)
- 4 podiums – (4 RL)

No.	Season	Date	Location	Race	Level	Place	Teammates
1	2003–04	7 February 2004	La Clusaz, France	4 × 10 km Relay C/F	World Cup	3rd	Pankratov / Ivanov / Novikov
2	2006–07	19 November 2006	Gällivare, Sweden	4 × 10 km Relay C/F	World Cup	2nd	Pankratov / Rochev / Legkov
3	2006–07	17 December 2006	La Clusaz, France	4 × 10 km Relay C/F	World Cup	1st	Pankratov / Rochev / Legkov
4	2007–08	25 November 2007	Beitostølen, Norway	4 × 10 km Relay C/F	World Cup	3rd	Rochev / Pankratov / Legkov
