= Vadim Gusevas =

Lithuanian cross-country skier (born 1981)

Personal information
- Nationality: Lithuanian
- Born: 16 June 1981 (age 44) Visaginas, Lithuanian SSR, Soviet Union

Sport
- Sport: Cross-country skiing

Vadim Gusevas (born 16 June 1981) is a Lithuanian cross-country skier. He competed in the men's 15 kilometre classical event at the 2002 Winter Olympics.
