= Cross-country skiing at the 2002 Winter Olympics – Men's 4 × 10 kilometre relay =

Men's 4 × 10 kilometre relay at the XIX Olympic Winter Games
- Venue: Soldier Hollow
- Dates: 17 February 2002
- Competitors: 60 from 15 nations
- Teams: 15
- Winning time: 1:32:45.5

Medalists
1st place, gold medalist(s)		Anders Aukland; Frode Estil; Kristen Skjeldal; Thomas Alsgaard	Norway
2nd place, silver medalist(s)		Fabio Maj; Giorgio Di Centa; Pietro Piller Cottrer; Cristian Zorzi	Italy
3rd place, bronze medalist(s)		Jens Filbrich; Andreas Schlütter; Tobias Angerer; René Sommerfeldt	Germany

The men's 4 × 10 kilometre relay cross-country skiing competition at the 2002 Winter Olympics in Salt Lake City, United States, was held on 17 February at Soldier Hollow.

At Nagano in 1998, the Norwegians beat the Italians by less than one tenth of a second, and in 1994 at Lillehammer the Italians beat the Norwegians by less than one tenth of a second. In the previous three Olympics, the winning team beat the silver medalists by a cumulative time of just under one tenth of a second.

== Results ==
Each team used four skiers, with each completing racing over the same 10 kilometre circuit. The first two raced in the classical style, and the final pair of skiers raced freestyle.

The race was started at 09:30.

Rank	Bib	Team	Time	Deficit
1st place, gold medalist(s)	1	Norway; Anders Aukland; Frode Estil; Kristen Skjeldal; Thomas Alsgaard	1:32:45.5; 24:27.4; 24:22.9; 22:10.5; 21:44.7	—
2nd place, silver medalist(s)	6	Italy; Fabio Maj; Giorgio Di Centa; Pietro Piller Cottrer; Cristian Zorzi	1:32:45.8; 24:35.8; 24:38.4; 21:47.1; 21:44.5	+0.3
3rd place, bronze medalist(s)	3	Germany; Jens Filbrich; Andreas Schlütter; Tobias Angerer; René Sommerfeldt	1:33:34.5; 24:39.9; 24:21.4; 22:12.4; 22:20.8	+49.0
4	5	Austria; Alexander Marent; Mikhail Botvinov; Gerhard Urain; Christian Hoffmann	1:34:04.9; 25:15.0; 24:22.1; 22:19.9; 22:07.9	+1:19.4
5	12	United States; John Bauer; Kris Freeman; Justin Wadsworth; Carl Swenson	1:34:05.5; 24:40.9; 24:34.9; 22:40.7; 22:09.0	+1:20.0
6	4	Russia; Sergey Novikov; Mikhail Ivanov; Vitaly Denisov; Nikolay Bolshakov	1:34:50.1; 25:17.6; 24:14.3; 22:34.9; 22:43.3	+2:04.6
7	13	Czech Republic; Martin Koukal; Jiří Magál; Lukáš Bauer; Petr Michl	1:35:31.3; 25:07.9; 25:30.9; 21:29.6; 23:22.9	+2:45.8
8	14	France; Alexandre Rousselet; Christophe Perrillat; Vincent Vittoz; Emmanuel Jonnier	1:35:50.8; 24:57.3; 25:31.9; 22:01.3; 23:20.3	+3:05.3
9	7	Estonia; Raul Olle; Andrus Veerpalu; Jaak Mae; Meelis Aasmäe	1:36:07.0; 25:16.7; 23:45.2; 22:08.0; 24:57.1	+3:21.5
10	8	Switzerland; Wilhelm Aschwanden; Reto Burgermeister; Patrick Mächler; Gion-Andrea Bundi	1:37:26.4; 25:54.9; 25:09.4; 23:05.5; 23:16.6	+4:40.9
11	15	Finland; Kuisma Taipale; Karri Hietamäki; Teemu Kattilakoski; Sami Repo	1:37:41.8; 26:01.7; 26:08.8; 23:02.2; 22:29.1	+4:56.3
12	11	Japan; Masaaki Kozu; Hiroyuki Imai; Mitsuo Horigome; Katsuhito Ebisawa	1:37:50.5; 26:28.4; 25:34.7; 22:56.5; 22:50.9	+5:05.0
13	2	Sweden; Urban Lindgren; Mathias Fredriksson; Niklas Jonsson; Morgan Göransson	1:37:59.5; 25:56.4; 25:35.3; 22:38.4; 23:49.4	+5:14.0
14	10	Kazakhstan; Andrey Golovko; Pavel Ryabinin; Nikolay Chebotko; Andrey Nevzorov	1:38:20.8; 24:39.2; 26:38.0; 23:42.2; 23:21.4	+5:35.3
15	9	Belarus; Roman Virolainen; Nikolay Semenyako; Aleksandr Sannikov; Sergey Dolidovich	1:42:12.0; 25:54.0; 27:24.8; 24:51.1; 24:02.1	+9:26.5
