= Cross-country skiing at the 2002 Winter Olympics – Men's 50 kilometre classical =

Men's 50 kilometre classical at the XIX Olympic Winter Games
- Venue: Soldier Hollow
- Dates: 23 February 2002
- Competitors: 61 from 24 nations
- Winning time: 2:06:20.8

Medalists
1st place, gold medalist(s)		Mikhail Ivanov; Russia
2nd place, silver medalist(s)		Andrus Veerpalu; Estonia
3rd place, bronze medalist(s)		Odd-Bjørn Hjelmeset; Norway

The Men's 50 kilometre classical cross-country skiing competition at the 2002 Winter Olympics in Salt Lake City, United States, was held on 23 February at Soldier Hollow.

All skiers started at 30 second intervals, skiing the entire 50 kilometre course. The defending Olympic champion was the Norwegian Bjørn Dæhlie, who won in Nagano with freestyle, but he retired after an accident, two years before the Olympics. Johann Mühlegg of Spain originally won the competition, but failed the doping test.

== Results ==
Rank	Name	Country	Time
Gold medal	Mikhail Ivanov	Russia	2:06:20.8
Silver medal	Andrus Veerpalu	Estonia	2:06:44.5
Bronze medal	Odd-Bjørn Hjelmeset	Norway	2:08:41.5
4	Andreas Schlütter	Germany	2:08:54.8
5	Mikhail Botvinov	Austria	2:09:21.7
6	Hiroyuki Imai	Japan	2:09:41.3
7	Anders Aukland	Norway	2:10:02.7
8	Lukáš Bauer	Czech Republic	2:10:41.9
9	Frode Estil	Norway	2:10:44.8
10	Erling Jevne	Norway	2:12:06.6
11	Giorgio Di Centa	Italy	2:12:59.6
12	Martin Bajčičák	Slovakia	2:13:07.9
13	Andrey Nevzorov	Kazakhstan	2:13:53.1
14	Fabio Maj	Italy	2:14:32.4
15	Vladimir Vilisov	Russia	2:14:37.5
16	Magnus Ingesson	Sweden	2:14:48.6
17	Per Elofsson	Sweden	2:14:50.6
18	Raul Olle	Estonia	2:15:00.0
19	Jiří Magál	Czech Republic	2:15:06.8
20	Juan Jesús Gutiérrez	Spain	2:15:14.4
21	Jens Filbrich	Germany	2:15:44.8
22	Roman Leybyuk	Ukraine	2:15:50.9
23	Andrey Golovko	Kazakhstan	2:16:42.2
24	Sergey Kryanin	Russia	2:16:59.8
25	Ivan Bátory	Slovakia	2:17:25.2
26	Fabio Santus	Italy	2:17:41.4
27	Masaaki Kozu	Japan	2:17:51.9
28	Aleksey Prokurorov	Russia	2:18:30.4
29	Mathias Fredriksson	Sweden	2:18:42.1
30	Sami Pietilä	Finland	2:19:10.7
31	Karri Hietamäki	Finland	2:19:32.0
32	Wilhelm Aschwanden	Switzerland	2:19:33.9
33	John Bauer	United States	2:19:35.7
34	Maksim Odnodvortsev	Kazakhstan	2:19:50.3
35	Igor Zubrilin	Kazakhstan	2:20:25.7
36	Markus Hasler	Liechtenstein	2:20:31.8
37	Reto Burgermeister	Switzerland	2:20:43.3
38	Katsuhito Ebisawa	Japan	2:21:05.3
39	Donald Farley	Canada	2:21:26.5
40	Aleksey Tregubov	Belarus	2:22:29.3
41	Hiroshi Kudo	Japan	2:23:02.3
42	Petr Michl	Czech Republic	2:23:43.3
43	Ričardas Panavas	Lithuania	2:23:56.4
44	Aleksandr Sannikov	Belarus	2:24:14.2
45	Patrick Rölli	Switzerland	2:24:34.4
46	Aleksandr Shalak	Belarus	2:24:37.2
47	Kuisma Taipale	Finland	2:24:40.5
48	Meelis Aasmäe	Estonia	2:27:18.8
49	Milan Šperl	Czech Republic	2:28:28.8
50	Vladislavas Zybaila	Lithuania	2:29:27.4
51	Andrew Johnson	United States	2:32:44.3
52	Damir Jurčević	Croatia	2:35:54.9
53	Denis Klobučar	Croatia	2:35:58.8
54	Han Dawei	China	2:44:50.0
55	Vadim Gusevas	Lithuania	2:45:23.0
56	Aram Hadzhiyan	Armenia	2:48:48.1
57	Alexander Penna	Brazil	3:23:58.7
	Haritz Zunzunegui	Spain	DNF
	Justin Wadsworth	United States	DNF
	Johann Mühlegg	Spain	DSQ
	Marc Mayer	Austria	DSQ
