= FIS Nordic World Ski Championships 2005 =

- Official logo for the FIS Nordic World Ski Championships 2005.
- Host city: Oberstdorf, Germany
- Events: 19
- Opening: 16 February 2005
- Closing: 27 February 2005
- Main venue: Schattenbergschanze
- Website: Oberstdorf2005.com

The FIS Nordic World Ski Championships 2005 took place 16–27 February 2005 in Oberstdorf, Germany, for the second time after hosting it previously in 1987. The ski jumping team normal hill event returned after not being held in 2003. The double pursuit distances of 10 km (5 km classical mass start + 5 km freestyle pursuit) women and 20 km (10 km classical mass start + 10 km freestyle pursuit) men were lengthened to 15 km for women (7.5 km classical mass start + 7.5 km freestyle pursuit) and 30 km for men (15 km classical mass start + 15 km freestyle pursuit). Team sprint was also added as well. The Nordic combined 4 × 5 km team event had its change between ski jumping points and cross-country skiing start time changed from 1 point equals to 1.5 seconds to 1 point equals 1 second at this championship.

== Cross-country skiing ==
=== Men ===
Event	Gold		Silver		Bronze	
15 kilometre freestyle	Pietro Piller Cottrer; Italy	34:49.7	Fulvio Valbusa; Italy	35:00.9	Tore Ruud Hofstad; Norway	35:03.9
30 kilometre skiathlon	Vincent Vittoz; France	1:19:20.5	Giorgio Di Centa; Italy	1:19:21.3	Frode Estil; Norway	1:19:21.3
50 kilometre classic mass start	Frode Estil; Norway	2:30:10.1	Anders Aukland; Norway	2:30:10.8	Odd-Bjørn Hjelmeset; Norway	2:30:11.5
4 × 10 kilometre relay	Norway; Odd-Bjørn Hjelmeset; Frode Estil; Lars Berger; Tore Ruud Hofstad	1:39:04.4	Germany; Jens Filbrich; Andreas Schlütter; Tobias Angerer; Axel Teichmann	1:39:22.1	Russia; Nikolay Pankratov; Vasily Rochev; Yevgeny Dementyev; Nikolay Bolshakov	1:39:23.1
Sprint classic	Vasily Rochev; Russia	2:32.1	Tor Arne Hetland; Norway	2:32.3	Thobias Fredriksson; Sweden	2:39.0
Team sprint	Norway; Tore Ruud Hofstad; Tor Arne Hetland	14:08.6	Germany; Jens Filbrich; Axel Teichmann	14:12.4	Czech Republic; Dušan Kožíšek; Martin Koukal	14:13.4

=== Women ===
Event	Gold		Silver		Bronze	
10 kilometre freestyle	Kateřina Neumannová; Czech Republic	26:27.6	Yuliya Chepalova; Russia	26:28.8	Marit Bjørgen; Norway	26:42.8
15 kilometre skiathlon	Yuliya Chepalova; Russia	42:16.8	Marit Bjørgen; Norway	42:32.5	Kristin Størmer Steira; Norway	42:42.7
30 kilometre classic mass start	Marit Bjørgen; Norway	1:27:05.8	Virpi Kuitunen; Finland	1:27:14.7	Natalya Baranova-Masalkina; Russia	1:27:16.1
4 × 5 kilometre relay	Norway; Vibeke Skofterud; Hilde Gjermundshaug Pedersen; Kristin Størmer Steira; Marit Bjørgen	57:15.7	Russia; Larisa Kurkina; Natalya Baranova-Masalkina; Yevgeniya Medvedeva-Abruzova; Yuliya Chepalova	57:23.3	Italy; Gabriella Paruzzi; Antonella Confortola; Sabina Valbusa; Arianna Follis	58:05.4
Sprint classic	Emilie Öhrstig; Sweden	2:15.5	Lina Andersson; Sweden	2:16.8	Sara Renner; Canada	2:16.9
Team sprint	Norway; Hilde Gjermundshaug Pedersen; Marit Bjørgen	12:19.7	Finland; Riitta-Liisa Lassila; Pirjo Manninen	12:22.5	Russia; Yuliya Chepalova; Alyona Sidko	12:23.3

- On the women's sprint classic, Sara Renner of Canada became the first North American skier to win a medal at the Nordic World Ski Championships.

== Men's Nordic combined ==
=== 7.5 km sprint ===
27 February 2005

Medal	Athlete	Time
Gold	Ronny Ackermann (GER)	20:15.6
Silver	Magnus Moan (NOR)	20:26.7
Bronze	Kristian Hammer (NOR)	20:53.3

=== 15 km individual Gundersen ===
18 February 2005

Medal	Athlete	Time
Gold	Ronny Ackermann (GER)	38:56.2
Silver	Björn Kircheisen (GER)	38:57.6
Bronze	Felix Gottwald (AUT)	38:59.4

=== 4 × 5 km team ===
23 February 2005

Medal	Athlete	Time
Gold	Norway (Petter Tande, Håvard Klemetsen, Magnus Moan, Kristian Hammer)	49:45.5
Silver	Germany (Sebastian Haseney, Georg Hettich, Björn Kircheisen, Ronny Ackermann)	49:52.6
Bronze	Austria (Michael Gruber, Christoph Bieler, David Kreiner, Felix Gottwald)	49:52.9

== Men's ski jumping ==
=== Individual normal hill ===
19 February 2005

Medal	Athlete	Points
Gold	Rok Benkovič (SLO)	256.0
Silver	Jakub Janda (CZE)	249.5
Bronze	Janne Ahonen (FIN)	249.0

=== Individual large hill ===
25 February 2005

Medal	Athlete	Points
Gold	Janne Ahonen (FIN)	313.2
Silver	Roar Ljøkelsøy (NOR)	307.2
Bronze	Jakub Janda (CZE)	304.2

=== Team normal hill ===
20 February 2005

Medal	Athlete	Points
Gold	Austria (Wolfgang Loitzl, Andreas Widhölzl, Thomas Morgenstern, Martin Höllwarth)	970.5
Silver	Germany (Michael Neumayer, Martin Schmitt, Michael Uhrmann, Georg Späth)	964.0
Bronze	Slovenia (Primož Peterka, Jure Bogataj, Rok Benkovič, Jernej Damjan)	929.5

=== Team large hill ===
26 February 2005

Medal	Athlete	Points
Gold	Austria (Wolfgang Loitzl, Andreas Widhölzl, Thomas Morgenstern, Martin Höllwarth)	1137.3
Silver	Finland (Risto Jussilainen, Tami Kiuru, Matti Hautamäki, Janne Ahonen)	1122.9
Bronze	Norway (Bjørn Einar Romøren, Sigurd Pettersen, Lars Bystøl, Roar Ljøkelsøy)	1113.5

== Medal table ==
Medal winners by nation.

* Host nation (Germany)

Rank	Nation	Gold	Silver	Bronze	Total
1	Norway (NOR)	7	5	7	19
2	Germany (GER)*	2	5	0	7
3	Russia (RUS)	2	2	3	7
4	Austria (AUT)	2	0	2	4
5	Finland (FIN)	1	3	1	5
6	Italy (ITA)	1	2	1	4
7	Czech Republic (CZE)	1	1	2	4
8	Sweden (SWE)	1	1	1	3
9	Slovenia (SLO)	1	0	1	2
10	France (FRA)	1	0	0	1
11	Canada (CAN)	0	0	1	1
Totals (11 entries)		19	19	19	57
