= 2012–13 Tour de Ski =

Cross-country skiing event

Tour de Ski
2012–13 FIS Cross-Country World Cup
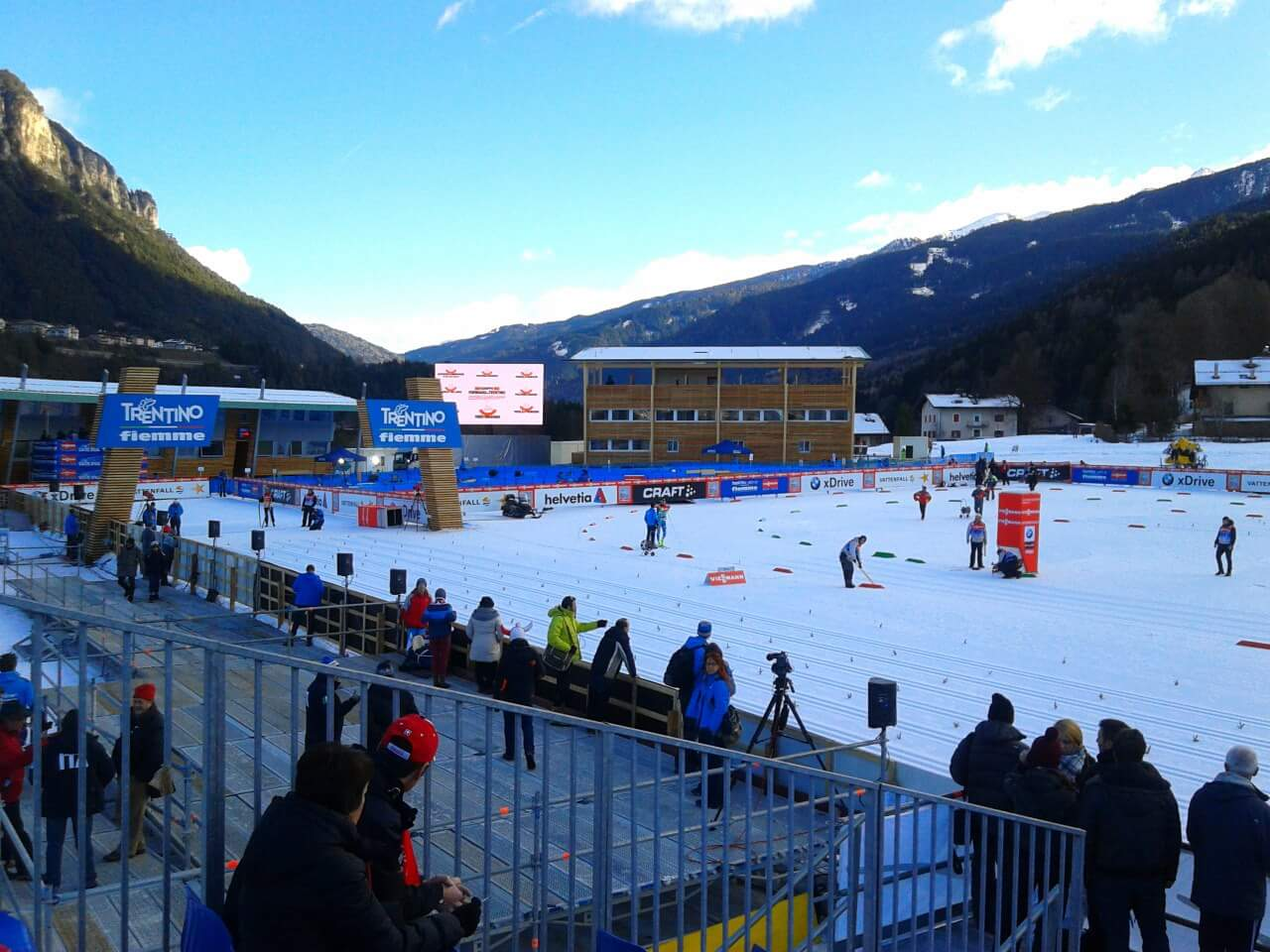
- Tour de Ski 2013 at Lago di Tesero Cross Country Stadium, Val di Fiemme, Italy.

Ski tour details
- Venue(s): Oberhof, Germany; Val Müstair, Switzerland; Cortina d'Ampezzo, Italy; Toblach, Italy; Val di Fiemme, Italy
- Dates: 29 December 2012 – 6 January 2013
- Stages: 7

Results
Men
| Jersey awarded to the men's overall winner | Winner | Alexander Legkov (RUS) |
| | Second | Dario Cologna (SUI) |
| | Third | Maxim Vylegzhanin (RUS) |
| Jersey awarded to the men's sprint classification winner | Sprint | Petter Northug (NOR) |
Women
| Jersey awarded to the women's overall winner | Winner | Justyna Kowalczyk (POL) |
| | Second | Therese Johaug (NOR) |
| | Third | Kristin Størmer Steira (NOR) |
| Jersey awarded to the women's sprint classification winner | Sprint | Justyna Kowalczyk (POL) |

The 2012–13 Tour de Ski was the seventh edition of the Tour de Ski. The event began in Oberhof, Germany on December 29, 2012, and ended in Val di Fiemme, Italy on January 6, 2013. The women's trophy was won by defending champion Justyna Kowalczyk (Poland) while the men's trophy was won by Russian Alexander Legkov ahead of defending champion Dario Cologna of Switzerland.

== Schedule ==
| Stage | Venue | Date | Event | Technique | Distance | | Start time (CET) | |
| Stage | Venue | Date | Event | Technique | Women | Men | Women | Men |
|---|---|---|---|---|---|---|---|---|
| 1 | Oberhof (GER) | 29 December 2012 | Prologue, individual start | Freestyle | 3.1 km | 4.0 km | 13:15 | 14:30 |
| 2 | Oberhof (GER) | 30 December 2012 | Distance, pursuit | Classic | 9 km | 15 km | 13:45 | 14:45 |
| 3 | Val Müstair (SUI) | 1 January 2013 | Sprint, qualification and finals | Freestyle | 1.4 km | 1.4 km | 14:00 Q 16:00 F | |
| 4 | Cortina-Toblach (ITA) | 3 January 2013 | Distance, pursuit | Freestyle | 15 km | 35 km | 12:15 | 15:15 |
| 5 | Toblach (ITA) | 4 January 2013 | Distance, individual start | Classic | 3 km | 5 km | 11:15 | 12:30 |
| 6 | Val di Fiemme (ITA) | 5 January 2013 | Distance, mass start | Classic | 10 km | 15 km | 12:30 | 13:30 |
| 7 | Val di Fiemme (ITA) | 6 January 2013 | Final Climb, pursuit | Freestyle | 9 km | 9 km | 11:45 | 14:50 |

== Final standings ==
Legend
| Denotes the winner of the Overall standings | Denotes the winner of the Sprint standings |

=== Overall standings ===
Final standings, with bonus seconds deducted.

==== Men ====
Final overall standings (1–10)
| Rank | Name | Time |
|---|---|---|
| 1 | Alexander Legkov (RUS) | 3:29:28.6 |
| 2 | Dario Cologna (SUI) | +18.7 |
| 3 | Maxim Vylegzhanin (RUS) | +40.7 |
| 4 | Petter Northug (NOR) | +1:07.7 |
| 5 | Marcus Hellner (SWE) | +1:12.4 |
| 6 | Lukáš Bauer (CZE) | +1:41.7 |
| 7 | Ivan Babikov (CAN) | +2:04.4 |
| 8 | Giorgio Di Centa (ITA) | +2:15.5 |
| 9 | Johan Olsson (SWE) | +2:20.7 |
| 10 | Ilia Chernousov (RUS) | +2:47.5 |

Final overall standings (11–65)
| Rank | Name | Time |
|---|---|---|
| 11 | Alexey Poltoranin (KAZ) | +2:54.2 |
| 12 | Devon Kershaw (CAN) | +2:57.4 |
| 13 | Daniel Rickardsson (SWE) | +2:58.3 |
| 14 | Calle Halfvarsson (SWE) | +2:58.3 |
| 15 | Tobias Angerer (GER) | +3:01.0 |
| 16 | Jens Filbrich (GER) | +3:33.1 |
| 17 | Curdin Perl (SUI) | +3:35.7 |
| 18 | Finn Hågen Krogh (NOR) | +3:45.6 |
| 19 | Dmitry Yaparov (RUS) | +3:46.3 |
| 20 | Alexander Bessmertnykh (RUS) | +4:07.2 |
| 21 | Tord Asle Gjerdalen (NOR) | +4:27.3 |
| 22 | Sergey Turyshev (RUS) | +4:31.2 |
| 23 | Len Väljas (CAN) | +4:54.8 |
| 24 | Johannes Dürr (AUT) | +5:07.7 |
| 25 | Thomas Moriggl (ITA) | +5:38.6 |
| 26 | Jean-Marc Gaillard (FRA) | +5:55.6 |
| 27 | Tom Reichelt (GER) | +6:49.7 |
| 28 | Hannes Dotzler (GER) | +6:49.7 |
| 29 | Remo Fischer (SUI) | +7:02.8 |
| 30 | Roland Clara (ITA) | +7:21.5 |
| 31 | Dietmar Nöckler (ITA) | +7:28.6 |
| 32 | Andrey Larkov (RUS) | +7:50.9 |
| 33 | Valerio Checchi (ITA) | +7:51.5 |
| 34 | Aivar Rehemaa (EST) | +8:02.1 |
| 35 | Michail Semenov (BLR) | +8:12.7 |
| 36 | Konstantin Glavatskikh (RUS) | +8:20.6 |
| 37 | Mathias Wibault (FRA) | +8:31.5 |
| 38 | Andreas Katz (GER) | +8:42.7 |
| 39 | Andy Kühne (GER) | +9:06.1 |
| 40 | Jiří Magál (CZE) | +9:13.3 |
| 41 | Thomas Bing (GER) | +9:13.9 |
| 42 | Lari Lehtonen (FIN) | +9:32.8 |
| 43 | Aleš Razým (CZE) | +9:38.5 |
| 44 | Kris Freeman (USA) | +10:09.7 |
| 45 | Fabrizio Clementi (ITA) | +10:18.6 |
| 46 | Noah Hoffman (USA) | +10:39.0 |
| 47 | Alexander Lasutkin (BLR) | +11:08.9 |
| 48 | Robin Duvillard (FRA) | +11:17.7 |
| 49 | Martin Johansson (SWE) | +11:25.8 |
| 50 | Toni Livers (SUI) | +12:28.8 |
| 51 | Maciej Kreczmer (POL) | +12:39.2 |
| 52 | Andrew Musgrave (GBR) | +13:33.3 |
| 53 | Vitaly Shtun (UKR) | +13:48.8 |
| 54 | Mattia Pellegrin (ITA) | +14:07.6 |
| 55 | Anton Linblad (SWE) | +14:12.0 |
| 56 | Yevgeniy Velichko (KAZ) | +14:58.8 |
| 57 | Algo Kärp (EST) | +15:52.1 |
| 58 | Jonas Baumann (SUI) | +16:13.6 |
| 59 | Yerdos Akhmadiyev (KAZ) | +16:59.0 |
| 60 | Artem Zhmurko (RUS) | +17:06.3 |
| 61 | Gennadiy Matviyenko (KAZ) | +18:46.4 |
| 62 | Myroslav Bilosyuk (UKR) | +20:23.5 |
| 63 | Karel Tammjärv (EST) | +20:43.8 |
| 64 | Oleksiy Shvidkiy (UKR) | +22:31.3 |
| 65 | Martin Møller (DEN) | +34:25.6 |

==== Women ====
Final overall standings (1–10)
| Rank | Name | Time |
|---|---|---|
| 1 | Justyna Kowalczyk (POL) | 2:25:21.6 |
| 2 | Therese Johaug (NOR) | +27.9 |
| 3 | Kristin Størmer Steira (NOR) | +2:39.5 |
| 4 | Krista Lähteenmäki (FIN) | +3:04.7 |
| 5 | Astrid Uhrenholdt Jacobsen (NOR) | +3:13.5 |
| 6 | Heidi Weng (NOR) | +3.29.1 |
| 7 | Charlotte Kalla (SWE) | +3.51.3 |
| 8 | Riitta-Liisa Roponen (FIN) | +4.19.6 |
| 9 | Anne Kyllönen (FIN) | +4:23.0 |
| 10 | Katrin Zeller (GER) | +4.58.4 |

Final overall standings (11–51)
| Rank | Name | Time |
|---|---|---|
| 11 | Emma Wikén (SWE) | +5:09.1 |
| 12 | Kikkan Randall (USA) | +5:19.9 |
| 13 | Denise Herrmann (GER) | +5:36.5 |
| 14 | Yuliya Chekalyova (RUS) | +5:40.4 |
| 15 | Elizabeth Stephen (USA) | +6:09.5 |
| 16 | Valentyna Shevchenko (UKR) | +6:31.2 |
| 17 | Kerttu Niskanen (FIN) | +6:42.2 |
| 18 | Anna Haag (SWE) | +7:16.6 |
| 19 | Yuliya Ivanova (RUS) | +7:37.5 |
| 20 | Aurore Jéan (FRA) | +8:27.7 |
| 21 | Jessie Diggins (USA) | +8:47.8 |
| 22 | Debora Agreiter (ITA) | +8:53.6 |
| 23 | Aliya Iksanova (RUS) | +9:17.0 |
| 24 | Virginia De Martin Topranin (ITA) | +9:20.5 |
| 25 | Polina Medvedeva (RUS) | +9:50.0 |
| 26 | Eva Vrabcová-Nývltová (CZE) | +10:17.8 |
| 27 | Anastasia Dotsenko (RUS) | +10:32.5 |
| 28 | Stefanie Böhler (GER) | +10:37.8 |
| 29 | Coraline Hugue (FRA) | +10:44.1 |
| 30 | Laura Ahervo (FIN) | +10:49.5 |
| 31 | Irina Khazova (RUS) | +10:56.0 |
| 32 | Olga Kuzyukova (RUS) | +11:32.2 |
| 33 | Anouk Faivre-Picon (FRA) | +11:39.8 |
| 34 | Veronica Cavallar (ITA) | +11:48.0 |
| 35 | Maryna Antsybor (UKR) | +12:25.7 |
| 36 | Yelena Kolomina (KAZ) | +12:33.5 |
| 37 | Kornelia Kubińska (POL) | +12:39.2 |
| 38 | Holly Brooks (USA) | +12:46.5 |
| 39 | Sara Lindborg (SWE) | +13:02.4 |
| 40 | Paulina Maciuszek (POL) | +13:13.3 |
| 41 | Mia Eriksson (SWE) | +14:13.8 |
| 42 | Marina Piller (ITA) | +14:15.9 |
| 43 | Jennie Öberg (SWE) | +14:22.7 |
| 44 | Ekaterina Rudakova (BLR) | +14:33.1 |
| 45 | Tatyana Osipova (KAZ) | +15:23.0 |
| 46 | Tatjana Mannima (EST) | +15:44.4 |
| 47 | Larisa Shaidurova (RUS) | +15:52.7 |
| 48 | Marina Matrosova (KAZ) | +16:10.7 |
| 49 | Alena Sannikova (BLR) | +16:17.4 |
| 50 | Oxana Yatskaya (KAZ) | +16:38.1 |
| 51 | Viktoriya Lanchakova (KAZ) | +20:06.1 |

=== Sprint standings ===
Final sprint standings, all bonus seconds counts.

==== Men ====
Final sprint standings (1–10)
| Rank | Name | Time |
|---|---|---|
| 1 | Petter Northug (NOR) | 1:38 |
| 2 | Maxim Vylegzhanin (RUS) | 1:28 |
| 3 | Dario Cologna (SUI) | 1:22 |
| 4 | Alexander Legkov (RUS) | 1:07 |
| 5 | Len Väljas (CAN) | 1:02 |
| 6 | Marcus Hellner (SWE) | 1:00 |
| 7 | Finn Hågen Krogh (NOR) | 1:00 |
| 8 | Alexey Poltoranin (KAZ) | 0:58 |
| 9 | Calle Halfvarsson (SWE) | 0:52 |
| 10 | Alex Harvey (CAN) | 0:37 |

==== Women ====
Final sprint standings (1–10)
| Rank | Name | Time |
|---|---|---|
| 1 | Justyna Kowalczyk (POL) | 2:15 |
| 2 | Kikkan Randall (USA) | 1:20 |
| 3 | Kristin Størmer Steira (NOR) | 1:14 |
| 4 | Therese Johaug (NOR) | 1:13 |
| 5 | Charlotte Kalla (SWE) | 1:08 |
| 6 | Heidi Weng (NOR) | 1:06 |
| 7 | Denise Herrmann (GER) | 0:38 |
| 8 | Aurore Jean (FRA) | 0:36 |
| 9 | Astrid Uhrenholdt Jacobsen (NOR) | 0:27 |
| 10 | Krista Lähteenmäki (FIN) | 0:25 |

== Stages ==
=== Stage 1 ===
29 December 2012, Oberhof, Germany - prologue

Men - 4.0 km Freestyle (individual start)
| Place | Name | Time |
|---|---|---|
| 1 | Petter Northug (NOR) | 8:28.7 |
| 2 | Marcus Hellner (SWE) | +6.1 |
| 3 | Alexander Legkov (RUS) | +7.2 |
| 4 | Dario Cologna (SUI) | +10.1 |
| 5 | Ilia Chernousov (RUS) | +10.7 |

Women - 3.1 km Freestyle (individual start)
| Place | Name | Time |
|---|---|---|
| 1 | Kikkan Randall (USA) | 7:28.1 |
| 2 | Charlotte Kalla (SWE) | +4.4 |
| 3 | Justyna Kowalczyk (POL) | +4.7 |
| 4 | Denise Herrmann (GER) | +9.3 |
| 5 | Riitta-Liisa Roponen (FIN) | +10.6 |

=== Stage 2 ===
30 December 2012, Oberhof, Germany

Men - 15 km Classic (pursuit)
| Place | Name | Time |
|---|---|---|
| 1 | Maxim Vylegzhanin (RUS) | 39:47.0 |
| 2 | Alexander Legkov (RUS) | +0.1 |
| 3 | Petter Northug (NOR) | +6.5 |
| 4 | Dario Cologna (SUI) | +6.7 |
| 5 | Alex Harvey (CAN) | +7.7 |

Women - 9 km Classic (pursuit)
| Place | Name | Time |
|---|---|---|
| 1 | Justyna Kowalczyk (POL) | 25:01.4 |
| 2 | Therese Johaug (NOR) | +41.4 |
| 3 | Anne Kyllönen (FIN) | +45.0 |
| 4 | Denise Herrmann (GER) | +48.5 |
| 5 | Kristin Størmer Steira (NOR) | +49.1 |

=== Stage 3 ===
1 January 2013, Val Müstair, Switzerland - sprint

Men - Sprint Freestyle
| Place | Name | Time |
|---|---|---|
| 1 | Finn Hågen Krogh (NOR) | 3:21.3 |
| 2 | Federico Pellegrino (ITA) | +1.0 |
| 3 | Len Väljas (CAN) | +1.6 |
| 4 | Dario Cologna (SUI) | +3.5 |
| 5 | Calle Halfvarsson (SWE) | +6.5 |
| 6 | Emil Jönsson (SWE) | +32.9 |

Women - Sprint Freestyle
| Place | Name | Time |
|---|---|---|
| 1 | Kikkan Randall (USA) | 3:37.0 |
| 2 | Ingvild Flugstad Østberg (NOR) | +8.7 |
| 3 | Heidi Weng (NOR) | +10.6 |
| 4 | Hanna Kolb (GER) | +12.6 |
| 5 | Kristin Størmer Steira (NOR) | +14.7 |
| 6 | Charlotte Kalla (SWE) | +19.6 |

=== Stage 4 ===
3 January 2013, Cortina d'Ampezzo – Toblach - distance (handicap start)

Men - 35 km Freestyle (pursuit)
| Rank | Name | Time |
|---|---|---|
| 1 | Petter Northug (NOR) | 1:16:32.7 |
| 2 | Alexander Legkov (RUS) | +0.7 |
| 3 | Dario Cologna (SUI) | +0.9 |
| 4 | Maxim Vylegzhanin (RUS) | +1.6 |
| 5 | Ilia Chernousov (RUS) | +1:25.7 |
| 6 | Alex Harvey (CAN) | +1:25.8 |
| 7 | Marcus Hellner (SWE) | +1:27.3 |
| 8 | Lukáš Bauer (CZE) | +1:27.8 |
| 9 | Finn Hågen Krogh (NOR) | +1:46.3 |
| 10 | Curdin Perl (SUI) | +1:47.1 |

Women - 15 km Freestyle (pursuit)
| Rank | Name | Time |
|---|---|---|
| 1 | Justyna Kowalczyk (POL) | 37:15.1 |
| 2 | Charlotte Kalla (SWE) | +18.3 |
| 3 | Therese Johaug (NOR) | +18.7 |
| 4 | Kristin Størmer Steira (NOR) | +19.2 |
| 5 | Anne Kyllönen (FIN) | +43.1 |
| 6 | Denise Herrmann (GER) | +43.3 |
| 7 | Astrid Uhrenholdt Jacobsen (NOR) | +44.0 |
| 8 | Kikkan Randall (USA) | +44.3 |
| 9 | Krista Lähteenmäki (FIN) | +1:25.8 |
| 10 | Emma Wikén (SWE) | +1:26.1 |

=== Stage 5 ===
4 January 2013, Val di Fiemme - distance (individual start)

Men - 5 km Classic (individual start)
| Place | Name | Time |
|---|---|---|
| 1 | Alexey Poltoranin (KAZ) | 12:37.9 |
| 2 | Petter Northug (NOR) | +8.0 |
| 3 | Dario Cologna (SUI) | +8.2 |
| 4 | Dmitriy Yaparov (RUS) | +13.7 |
| 5 | Alexander Legkov (RUS) | +15.7 |

Women - 3 km Classic (individual start)
| Place | Name | Time |
|---|---|---|
| 1 | Justyna Kowalczyk (POL) | 10:08.1 |
| 2 | Krista Lähteenmäki (FIN) | +16.5 |
| 3 | Astrid Uhrenholdt Jacobsen (NOR) | +17.1 |
| 4 | Anne Kyllönen (FIN) | +17.7 |
| 5 | Aino-Kaisa Saarinen (FIN) | +21.1 |

=== Stage 6 ===
5 January 2013, Val di Fiemme - distance (mass start)

Men - 15 km Classic (mass start)
| Place | Name | Time |
|---|---|---|
| 1 | Alexey Poltoranin (KAZ) | 39:01.5 |
| 2 | Len Väljas (CAN) | +0.1 |
| 3 | Alex Harvey (CAN) | +0.4 |
| 4 | Giorgio di Centa (ITA) | +0.7 |
| 5 | Alexander Legkov (RUS) | +0.9 |

Women - 10 km Classic (mass start)
| Place | Name | Time |
|---|---|---|
| 1 | Justyna Kowalczyk (POL) | 28:12.9 |
| 2 | Kristin Størmer Steira (NOR) | +33.2 |
| 3 | Krista Lähteenmäki (FIN) | +39.0 |
| 4 | Therese Johaug (NOR) | +41.1 |
| 5 | Aino-Kaisa Saarinen (FIN) | +1:01.6 |

=== Stage 7 ===
6 January 2013, Val di Fiemme - distance (final climb)

Men - 9 km Final Climb Freestyle (pursuit)
| Place | Name | Time |
|---|---|---|
| 1 | Marcus Hellner (SWE) | 29:59.6 |
| 2 | Ivan Babikov (CAN) | +13.3 |
| 3 | Roland Clara (ITA) | +14.6 |
| 4 | Johannes Dürr (AUT) | +20.3 |
| 5 | Thomas Moriggl (ITA) | +31.5 |
| 6 | Giorgio Di Centa (ITA) | +41.4 |
| 7 | Johan Olsson (SWE) | +42.8 |
| 8 | Lukáš Bauer (CZE) | +43.2 |
| 9 | Robin Duvillard (FRA) | +53.8 |
| 10 | Alexander Legkov (RUS) | +57.3 |

Women - 9 km Final Climb Freestyle (pursuit)
| Place | Name | Time |
|---|---|---|
| 1 | Therese Johaug (NOR) | 34:12.4 |
| 2 | Elizabeth Stephen (USA) | +39.5 |
| 3 | Heidi Weng (NOR) | +1:10.8 |
| 4 | Riitta-Liisa Roponen (FIN) | +1:33.3 |
| 5 | Krista Lähteenmäki (FIN) | +1:33.5 |
| 6 | Astrid Uhrenholdt Jacobsen (NOR) | +1:35.0 |
| 7 | Justyna Kowalczyk (POL) | +1:40.1 |
| 8 | Valentyna Shevchenko (UKR) | +1:41.8 |
| 9 | Debora Agreiter (ITA) | +1:44.1 |
| 10 | Katrin Zeller (GER) | +1:54.4 |
