= Ukraine at the 2013 Winter Universiade =

- IOC code: UKR
- NOC: Sports Student Union of Ukraine
- Website: osvitasport.org

in Trentino, Italy 11 December 2013 – 21 December 2013
- Competitors: 92 in 9 sports
- Medals Ranked 8th: Gold 3 Silver 3 Bronze 3 Total 9

Winter Universiade appearances (overview)
- 1993; 1995; 1997; 1999; 2001; 2003; 2005; 2007; 2009; 2011; 2013; 2015; 2017; 2019; 2023; 2025

Ukraine competed at the 2013 Winter Universiade in Trentino, Italy. 92 Ukrainian athletes (sixth largest team behind Russia, Japan, Canada, United States, and Italy) competed in 9 sports out of 12 except in curling, freestyle skiing, and speed skating. Ukraine won 9 medals, 3 of which were gold, and ranked 8th.

== Competitors ==
At the Games, 92 Ukrainian athletes took part. The team included four Olympians.

Sport	Men	Women	Total
Alpine skiing	5	1	6
Biathlon	7	8	15
Cross-country skiing	9	8	17
Figure skating	3	4	7
Ice hockey	22	—	22
Nordic combined	1	—	1
Short-track speed skating	5	2	7
Ski jumping	3	—	5
Snowboarding	4	4	8
Total	59	27	86

== Medallists ==
Medal	Name	Sport	Event
Gold	Dmytro Pidruchnyi	Biathlon	Men's 15 km mass start
Gold	Kateryna Grygorenko	Cross-country skiing	Women's 5 km freestyle
Gold	Kateryna Grygorenko; Maryna Antsybor; Kateryna Serdyuk	Cross-country skiing	Women's 3 x 5 km relay
Silver	Vitaliy Kilchytskyy	Biathlon	Men's 10 km sprint
Silver	Iryna Varvynets; Iana Bondar; Vitaliy Kilchytskyy; Dmytro Pidruchnyi	Biathlon	Mixed 2 x 6 km + 2 x 7.5 km relay
Silver	Kateryna Grygorenko	Cross-country skiing	Women's skiathlon
Bronze	Dmytro Pidruchnyi	Biathlon	Men's 10 km sprint
Bronze	Iryna Varvynets	Biathlon	Women's 12.5 km mass start
Bronze	Maryna Antsybor	Cross-country skiing	Women's 5 km freestyle

== Alpine skiing ==
The team included one Olympian (Rostyslav Feshchuk).

Men

Athlete	Event	Run 1		Run 2		Total	
Athlete	Event	Time	Rank	Time	Rank	Time	Rank
Vasyl Telychuk	Downhill	—N/a				1:22.13	43
Vasyl Telychuk	Super-G	—N/a				1:31.79	55
Vasyl Telychuk	Giant slalom	1:03.55	74	DNF2			
Vasyl Telychuk	Slalom	DNF1					
Dmytro Mytsak	Downhill	—N/a				1:19.31	39
Dmytro Mytsak	Super-G	—N/a				1:30.27	49
Rostyslav Feshchuk	Downhill	—N/a				1:19.04	37
Rostyslav Feshchuk	Super-G	—N/a				1:30.50	51
Ivan Kovbasnyuk	Downhill	—N/a				1:18.60	34
Ivan Kovbasnyuk	Super-G	—N/a				DNF	
Illya Karpushyn	Super-G	—N/a				DNS	

Women

Athlete	Event	Run 1		Run 2		Total	
Athlete	Event	Time	Rank	Time	Rank	Time	Rank
Tetyana Tikun	Combined	—N/a				223 p.	15
Tetyana Tikun	Downhill	—N/a				1:22.38	15
Tetyana Tikun	Super-G	—N/a				1:33.83	26
Tetyana Tikun	Giant slalom	59.20	43	59.18	41	1:58.38	39
Tetyana Tikun	Slalom	DNF1					

== Biathlon ==
Men

Athlete	Event	Time	Misses	Rank
Dmytro Pidruchnyi	Individual	54:59.5	4 (0+1+1+2)	9
Ivan Moravskyi	Individual	55:15.7	2 (0+2+0+0)	11
Oleksandr Dakhno	Individual	55:51.5	2 (1+0+0+1)	15
Vitaliy Kilchytskyy	Individual	56:06.9	4 (1+1+1+1)	17
Vasyl Potapenko	Individual	56:35.6	3 (1+1+0+1)	18
Dmytro Rusinov	Individual	58:12.0	7 (2+3+2+0)	27
Vitaliy Kilchytskyy	Sprint	25:33.0	0 (0+0)	2nd place, silver medalist(s)
Dmytro Pidruchnyi	Sprint	25:38.2	2 (1+1)	3rd place, bronze medalist(s)
Dmytro Rusinov	Sprint	25:56.7	2 (1+1)	6
Ruslan Tkalenko	Sprint	26:04.0	2 (1+1)	9
Artem Tyshchenko	Sprint	28:40.1	0 (0+0)	10
Ivan Moravskyi	Sprint	26:28.6	1 (0+1)	17
Dmytro Pidruchnyi	Pursuit	+27.1	4 (1+0+1+2)	5
Ruslan Tkalenko	Pursuit	+1:52.0	5 (0+0+2+3)	13
Artem Tyshchenko	Pursuit	+1:58.7	3 (0+1+1+1)	14
Vitaliy Kilchytskyy	Pursuit	+2:01.6	5 (1+0+2+2)	16
Dmytro Rusinov	Pursuit	+2:23.2	6 (2+2+2+0)	19
Ivan Moravskyi	Pursuit	+3:09.3	5 (1+1+1+2)	23
Dmytro Pidruchnyi	Mass start	39:00.8	1 (0+0+1+0)	1st place, gold medalist(s)
Ivan Moravskyi	Mass start	+1:53.7	3 (1+0+1+1)	14
Artem Tyshchenko	Mass start	+3:05.9	7 (2+0+2+3)	22
Dmytro Rusinov	Mass start	+3:16.5	7 (3+3+0+1)	24
Ruslan Tkalenko	Mass start	+3:36.2	7 (2+1+2+2)	25

Women

Athlete	Event	Time	Misses	Rank
Yuliya Zhuravok	Individual	49:08.2	1 (0+0+0+1)	7
Yuliya Bryhynets	Individual	51:13.4	3 (0+2+1+0)	14
Nadiia Bielkina	Individual	54:49.0	8 (1+1+4+2)	25
Olga Abramova	Individual	Did not start		
Iryna Varvynets	Sprint	24:00.0	1 (0+1)	4
Alla Ghilenko	Sprint	24:41.8	1 (1+0)	10
Anastasiya Merkushyna	Sprint	24:50.6	2 (1+1)	13
Olga Abramova	Sprint	25:20.8	3 (1+2)	16
Iana Bondar	Sprint	25:23.3	5 (2+3)	17
Nadiia Bielkina	Sprint	25:32.7	3 (1+2)	21
Iryna Varvynets	Pursuit	+1:12.0	1 (0+0+1+0)	4
Iana Bondar	Pursuit	+3:33.1	4 (0+1+2+1)	8
Anastasiya Merkushyna	Pursuit	+4:09.3	5 (3+0+0+2)	10
Alla Ghilenko	Pursuit	+4:32.5	6 (2+2+1+1)	13
Nadiia Bielkina	Pursuit	+6:08.1	6 (3+1+1+1)	21
Olga Abramova	Pursuit	Did not start		
Iryna Varvynets	Mass start	+56.0	1 (0+0+0+1)	3rd place, bronze medalist(s)
Iana Bondar	Mass start	+2:04.3	4 (0+2+1+1)	8
Anastasiya Merkushyna	Mass start	+2:51.5	3 (1+1+0+1)	13
Yuliya Zhuravok	Mass start	+3:14.5	3 (1+1+1+0)	14
Alla Ghilenko	Mass start	+5:29.4	8 (1+3+2+2)	22

Mixed

Athlete	Event	Time	Misses	Rank
Iryna Varvynets; Iana Bondar; Vitaliy Kilchytskyy; Dmytro Pidruchnyi	Relay	+1:28.9	1+11	2nd place, silver medalist(s)

== Cross-country skiing ==
Ukraine was represented by 17 athletes. The team included two Olympians (Maryna Antsybor and Kateryna Grygorenko). Oleksandr Moskalenko, Iryna Leletko and Zlata Solovei were reserve skiers.

Distance
Men

Athlete	Event	Final result		
Athlete	Event	Time	Deficit	Rank
Oleksiy Krasovsky	15 km skiathlon	DNF		
Oleksiy Krasovsky	30 km mass start	1:28:05.5	+4:51.3	26
Kostyantyn Yaremenko	10 km freestyle	25:53.2	+1:55.8	52
Kostyantyn Yaremenko	15 km skiathlon	42:36.6	+3:54.5	50
Kostyantyn Yaremenko	30 km mass start	1:36:35.6	+13:21.4	57
Myroslav Bilosyuk	10 km freestyle	25:08.1	+1:10.7	24
Myroslav Bilosyuk	15 km skiathlon	41:45.8	+3:03.7	42
Myroslav Bilosyuk	30 km mass start	1:30:10.2	+6:56.0	34
Dmytro Kozachok	15 km skiathlon	42:11.8	+3:29.7	47
Dmytro Kozachok	30 km mass start	1:29:06.7	+5:52.5	31
Ruslan Perekhoda	10 km freestyle	25:33.5	+1:36.1	39
Vitaliy Shtun	10 km freestyle	25:01.7	+1:04.3	19
Vitaliy Shtun	15 km skiathlon	39:01.7	+19.6	10
Oleksiy Shvidkiy	15 km skiathlon	40:59.6	+2:17.5	37
Oleh Ioltukhovskyi	10 km freestyle	25:18.3	+1:20.9	30
Oleksiy Krasovsky; Vitaliy Shtun; Oleh Ioltukhovskyi; Myroslav Bilosyuk	4×7.5 km relay	1:46:18.6	+3:15.0	9

Women

Athlete	Event	Final result		
Athlete	Event	Time	Deficit	Rank
Maryna Antsybor	5 km freestyle	13:27.3	+0.2	3rd place, bronze medalist(s)
Maryna Antsybor	10 km skiathlon	30:16.0	+41.3	13
Maryna Antsybor	15 km mass start	DNS		
Kateryna Grygorenko	5 km freestyle	13:27.1		1st place, gold medalist(s)
Kateryna Grygorenko	10 km skiathlon	29:35.7	+1.0	2nd place, silver medalist(s)
Kateryna Grygorenko	15 km mass start	43:57.4	+1:07.0	12
Viktoriia Olekh	5 km freestyle	14:26.5	+59.4	45
Viktoriia Olekh	10 km skiathlon	33:11.6	+3:36.9	51
Viktoriia Olekh	15 km mass start	DNS		
Kateryna Serdiuk	5 km freestyle	13:28.6	+1.5	4
Kateryna Serdiuk	10 km skiathlon	29:46.6	+11.9	7
Kateryna Serdiuk	15 km mass start	43:57.7	+1:07.3	13
Oksana Shatalova	5 km freestyle	14:30.3	+1:03.2	49
Oksana Shatalova	10 km skiathlon	32:42.9	+3:08.2	46
Oksana Shatalova	15 km mass start	48:07.9	+5:17.5	43
Zoia Zaviedieieva	5 km freestyle	13:53.4	+26.3	21
Zoia Zaviedieieva	10 km skiathlon	30:20.5	+45.8	16
Zoia Zaviedieieva	15 km mass start	44:28.4	+1:38.0	17
Kateryna Grygorenko; Maryna Antsybor; Kateryna Serdiuk	3×5 km relay	42:15.8		1st place, gold medalist(s)

Sprint

Athlete	Event	Qualification		Quarterfinal		Semifinal		Final	
Athlete	Event	Time	Rank	Time	Rank	Time	Rank	Time	Rank
Oleksiy Krasovsky	Men's sprint	3:35.68	26 Q	+9.23	QF5	Did not advance			
Myroslav Bilosyuk	Men's sprint	3:45.92	56	Did not advance					
Ruslan Perekhoda	Men's sprint	3:32.30	17 Q	+16.52	QF6	Did not advance			
Vitaliy Shtun	Men's sprint	3:40.75	45	Did not advance					
Oleksiy Shvidkiy	Men's sprint	3:35.84	27 Q	+1.32	QF4	Did not advance			
Oleh Ioltukhovskyi	Men's sprint	3:48.09	63	Did not advance					
Maryna Antsybor	Women's sprint	3:35.77	17 Q	+3.39	QF4	Did not advance			
Kateryna Grygorenko	Women's sprint	3:38.20	24 Q	+9.59	QF5	Did not advance			
Viktoriia Olekh	Women's sprint	3:48.42	43	Did not advance					
Kateryna Serdiuk	Women's sprint	3:34.64	15 Q	+1.88	QF2 Q	+5.37	SF5	Did not advance	
Oksana Shatalova	Women's sprint	3:50.22	47	Did not advance					
Zoia Zaviedieieva	Women's sprint	3:36.71	20 Q	+7.82	QF6	Did not advance			

Mixed team sprint

Athlete	Event	Semifinal		Final	
Athlete	Event	Time	Rank	Time	Rank
Kateryna Serdiuk; Ruslan Perekhoda	Mixed team sprint	+10.73	4 QF	+20.24	8
Maryna Antsybor; Oleh Ioltukhovskyi	Mixed team sprint	+23.02	7	DNA	

== Figure skating ==
Athlete	Event	SP		FS		Total	
Athlete	Event	Points	Rank	Points	Rank	Points	Rank
Ihor Reznichenko	Men's singles	62.65	12 Q	117.86	10	180.51	11
Anna Khnychenkova	Ladies' singles	41.38	11 Q	87.34	8	128.72	9
Anastasia Yalovaia	Ladies' singles	35.88	16 Q	60.74	21	96.62	19
Siobhan Heekin-Canedy; Dmytro Dun	Ice dance	44.34	10	74.37	8	118.71	9
Nadiia Frolenkova; Vitali Nikiforov	Ice dance	41.21	12	64.44	11	105.65	12

== Ice hockey ==
Team roster

Head coach: Serhiy Lubnin

No.	Pos.	Name	Height	Weight	Birthdate	Team
1	GK	Andrii Bezkhlibnyi	182 cm (6 ft 0 in)	78 kg (172 lb)	25 July 1989 (aged 24)	(Ukraine) Bilyi Bars
2	D	Andriy Tatarenko	175 cm (5 ft 9 in)	72 kg (159 lb)	26 February 1991 (aged 22)	(Ukraine) Kompanion Kyiv
3	D	Kostiantyn Sharapov	173 cm (5 ft 8 in)	69 kg (152 lb)	9 May 1991 (aged 22)	(Ukraine) Bilyi Bars
5	D	Pavlo Akymov	186 cm (6 ft 1 in)	92 kg (203 lb)	5 March 1986 (aged 27)	(Ukraine) Sokil Kyiv
6	D	Artem Ievseichyk	176 cm (5 ft 9 in)	71 kg (157 lb)	8 September 1993 (aged 20)	(Ukraine) HC Kremenchuk
7	А	Vitalii Kyrychenko	185 cm (6 ft 1 in)	80 kg (180 lb)	4 January 1985 (aged 28)	(Ukraine) Bilyi Bars
8	D	Ruslan Svyrydov	169 cm (5 ft 7 in)	60 kg (130 lb)	8 January 1988 (aged 25)	(Ukraine) Kompanion Kyiv
9	D	Dmytro Nimenko	180 cm (5 ft 11 in)	79 kg (174 lb)	1 May 1988 (aged 25)	(Ukraine) Bilyi Bars
10	F	Ivan Savchenko	196 cm (6 ft 5 in)	86 kg (190 lb)	19 March 1993 (aged 20)	(Ukraine) Bilyi Bars
11	D	Denys Khonin	186 cm (6 ft 1 in)	85 kg (187 lb)	24 June 1989 (aged 24)	(Ukraine) HC Generals Kyiv
13	F	Yevgeniy Lymnaskyy	196 cm (6 ft 5 in)	88 kg (194 lb)	10 September 1992 (aged 21)	(Ukraine) Sokil Kyiv
14	F	Nikita Butsenko	185 cm (6 ft 1 in)	74 kg (163 lb)	20 January 1990 (aged 23)	(Ukraine) Bilyi Bars
15	F	Sergii Babynets	195 cm (6 ft 5 in)	89 kg (196 lb)	5 September 1987 (aged 26)	(Ukraine) Bilyi Bars
16	F	Oleg Zadoienko	168 cm (5 ft 6 in)	65 kg (143 lb)	20 January 1990 (aged 23)	(Ukraine) Sokil Kyiv
17	D	Dmytro Isaienko	185 cm (6 ft 1 in)	86 kg (190 lb)	5 March 1988 (aged 25)	(Ukraine) Haidamaky Kharkiv
18	F	Oleksei Voytsekhovsky	195 cm (6 ft 5 in)	87 kg (192 lb)	10 May 1987 (aged 26)	(Ukraine) Sokil Kyiv
19	F	Dmytro Demianiuk	185 cm (6 ft 1 in)	80 kg (180 lb)	12 August 1988 (aged 25)	(Ukraine) Bilyi Bars
20	GK	Ievgenii Napnenko	169 cm (5 ft 7 in)	65 kg (143 lb)	27 May 1988 (aged 25)	(Ukraine) Bilyi Bars
21	D	Volodymyr Aleksyuk	192 cm (6 ft 4 in)	86 kg (190 lb)	22 June 1987 (aged 26)	(Ukraine) Bilyi Bars
22	F	Yegor Bezuglyy	176 cm (5 ft 9 in)	70 kg (150 lb)	1 October 1991 (aged 22)	(Ukraine) Sokil Kyiv
23	D	Valentyn Aleksiuk	196 cm (6 ft 5 in)	89 kg (196 lb)	15 September 1989 (aged 24)	(Ukraine) Bilyi Bars
24	F	Ievgen Sekirko	189 cm (6 ft 2 in)	85 kg (187 lb)	24 May 1988 (aged 25)	(Ukraine) Sokil Kyiv

Summary

Team	Event	Group stage				Placement round	Placement game	
Team	Event	Opposition Score	Opposition Score	Opposition Score	Rank	Opposition Score	Opposition Score	Rank
Ukraine men's team	Men's tournament	Kazakhstan; L 2-4	Canada; L 0-11	Japan; W 4-3 SO	3	Great Britain; W 14-1	Sweden; W 6-5 OT	9

== Nordic combined ==
Men

Athlete	Event	Total	
Athlete	Event	Time/Points	Rank
Oleh Vilivchuk	Individual Gundersen	34:07.2	34
Oleh Vilivchuk	Mass start	128.7	35

== Short track speed skating ==
Ukraine was represented by 7 athletes.

Men

Athlete	Event	Prel. Heat		Heat		Quarterfinal		Semifinal		Final	
Athlete	Event	Time	Rank	Time	Rank	Time	Rank	Time	Rank	Time	Rank
Valentyn Danilovskyi	500 m	PEN		Did not advance							
Valentyn Danilovskyi	1000 m	1:30.106	3	Did not advance							
Ievgen Gutenkov	500 m	42.939	4	Did not advance							
Ievgen Gutenkov	1000 m	PEN		Did not advance							
Ievgen Gutenkov	1500 m	—N/a		2:17.955	2 Q	2:31.924	4	Did not advance			
Artem Khmelivskyi	1500 m	—N/a		2:23.273	4	Did not advance					
Serhiy Lifyrenko	500 m	PEN		Did not advance							
Serhiy Lifyrenko	1000 m	1:30.732	2 Q	1:30.210	3	Did not advance					
Serhiy Lifyrenko	1500 m	—N/a		2:23.246	3 Q	2:27.644	5	Did not advance			
Valentyn Danilovskyi; Ievgen Gutenkov; Artem Khmelivskyi; Serhiy Lifyrenko; Mykyta Sokolov	5000 m relay	—N/a				7:13.285	3 q	7:03.323	3 QB	7:01.737	3 (7)

Women

Athlete	Event	Heat		Quarterfinal		Semifinal		Final	
Athlete	Event	Time	Rank	Time	Rank	Time	Rank	Time	Rank
Olena Korinchuk	500 m	PEN		Did not advance					
Olena Korinchuk	1000 m	1:34.440	3	Did not advance					
Olena Korinchuk	1500 m	2:30.895	3 Q	2:26.509	5	Did not advance			
Sofiya Vlasova	500 m	46.702	4	Did not advance					
Sofiya Vlasova	1000 m	1:36.212	3	Did not advance					
Sofiya Vlasova	1500 m	2:30.578	3 Q	2:26.618	6	Did not advance			

== Ski jumping ==
Men

Athlete	Event	Jump 1		Jump 2		Total	
Athlete	Event	Distance	Points	Distance	Points	Points	Rank
Andriy Kalinchuk	Men's normal hill	84.7	37	Did not advance			
Andriy Kalinchuk	Men's large hill	69.8	37	Did not advance			
Ihor Yakibyuk	Men's normal hill	66.5	43	Did not advance			
Ihor Yakibyuk	Men's large hill	38.4	39	Did not advance			
Vitaliy Dodyuk	Men's normal hill	48.9	44	Did not advance			
Vitaliy Dodyuk	Men's large hill	DSQ		Did not advance			
Andriy Kalinchuk; Ihor Yakibyuk; Vitaliy Dodyuk	Men's large hill team	—N/a				373.3	8

== Snowboarding ==
The team included one Olympian (Annamari Chundak). Oksana Dmytriv was expected to compete in halfpipe but she eventually did not appear in the start list.

Parallel giant slalom

Athlete	Event	Qualification		Round of 16	Quarterfinal	Semifinal	Final	
Athlete	Event	Time	Rank	Opposition Time	Opposition Time	Opposition Time	Opposition Time	Rank
Oleksandr Belinskyy	Men's	1:24.90	11 Q	(Russia) Zhivaev; L +0.34	Did not advance			
Taras Bihus	Men's	1:26.39	19	Did not advance				
Oleksandr Hasparovych	Men's	1:33.81	26	Did not advance				
Roman Aleksandrovskyy	Men's	DSQ		Did not advance				
Annamari Chundak	Women's	1:33.36	8 Q	(Italy) Boccacini; W	(Austria) Dujmovits; L +0.68	Did not advance		7
Tetyana Romanyshyn	Women's	1:38.52	16 Q	(Austria) Dujmovits; L +6.04	Did not advance			
Iryna Hreshchuk	Women's	1:45.82	21	Did not advance				
Oksana Dmytriv	Women's	DNF2	29	Did not advance				

== See also ==
- Ukraine at the 2013 Summer Universiade

== Sources ==
- Results in alpine skiing
- Results in biathlon
- Results in cross-country skiing
- Results in freestyle skiing
- Results in Nordic combined
- Results in short track speed skating
- Results in ski jumping
- Results in snowboarding
- Results in speed skating
