= FIS Nordic World Ski Championships 2013 – Men's 30 kilometre pursuit =

Men's 30 kilometre pursuit at the FIS Nordic World Ski Championships 2013
- Date: 23 February 2013
- Competitors: 94 from 36 nations
- Winning time: 1:13:09.3

Medalists
gold medal	Dario Cologna	Switzerland
silver medal	Martin Johnsrud Sundby	Norway
bronze medal	Sjur Røthe	Norway

The men's 30 kilometre pursuit at the FIS Nordic World Ski Championships 2013 took place on 23 February 2013.

== Results ==
The race was started at 14:15.

Rank	Bib	Athlete	Country	Time	Deficit
1st place, gold medalist(s)	1	Dario Cologna	Switzerland	1:13:09.3	
2nd place, silver medalist(s)	14	Martin Johnsrud Sundby	Norway	1:13:11.1	+1.8
3rd place, bronze medalist(s)	5	Sjur Røthe	Norway	1:13:11.3	+2.0
4	4	Petter Northug	Norway	1:13:14.5	+5.2
5	6	Maxim Vylegzhanin	Russia	1:13:15.4	+6.1
6	2	Alexander Legkov	Russia	1:13:19.4	+10.1
7	20	Calle Halfvarsson	Sweden	1:13:20.9	+11.6
8	7	Marcus Hellner	Sweden	1:13:21.3	+12.0
9	8	Tobias Angerer	Germany	1:13:21.7	+12.4
10	22	Jean-Marc Gaillard	France	1:13:22.0	+12.7
11	9	Evgeniy Belov	Russia	1:13:22.3	+13.0
12	41	Tord Asle Gjerdalen	Norway	1:13:22.7	+13.4
13	17	Alex Harvey	Canada	1:13:25.4	+16.1
14	18	Curdin Perl	Switzerland	1:13:25.9	+16.6
15	23	Johannes Dürr	Austria	1:13:26.0	+16.7
16	13	Giorgio di Centa	Italy	1:13:27.1	+17.8
17	19	Matti Heikkinen	Finland	1:13:30.0	+20.7
18	26	Daniel Rickardsson	Sweden	1:13:31.1	+21.8
19	29	Anders Södergren	Sweden	1:13:31.5	+22.2
20	11	Roland Clara	Italy	1:13:32.2	+22.9
21	10	Maurice Manificat	France	1:13:35.2	+25.9
22	37	Keishin Yoshida	Japan	1:13:36.1	+26.8
23	12	Lukáš Bauer	Czech Republic	1:13:36.9	+27.6
24	21	Hannes Dotzler	Germany	1:13:42.5	+33.2
25	3	Ilia Chernousov	Russia	1:13:42.5	+33.2
26	46	Michail Semenov	Belarus	1:13:43.6	+34.3
27	43	Lari Lehtonen	Finland	1:13:54.9	+45.6
28	31	Martin Jakš	Czech Republic	1:13:55.6	+46.3
29	32	Dietmar Noeckler	Italy	1:13:57.2	+47.9
30	42	Aivar Rehemaa	Estonia	1:13:59.7	+50.4
31	44	Jiří Magál	Czech Republic	1:14:00.8	+51.5
32	16	Ivan Babikov	Canada	1:14:03.0	+53.7
33	24	Eldar Rønning	Norway	1:14:20.3	+1:11.0
34	15	Jens Filbrich	Germany	1:14:28.6	+1:19.3
35	53	Yevgeniy Velichko	Kazakhstan	1:14:35.7	+1:26.4
36	30	Valerio Checchi	Italy	1:14:57.6	+1:48.3
37	38	Mathias Wibault	France	1:15:02.1	+1:52.8
38	33	Martin Bajčičák	Slovakia	1:15:25.7	+2:16.4
39	51	Andrew Musgrave	Great Britain	1:15:33.4	+2:24.1
40	47	Tero Similä	Finland	1:15:35.1	+2:25.8
41	28	Kris Freeman	United States	1:15:44.3	+2:35.0
42	50	Paul Constantin Pepene	Romania	1:15:45.2	+2:35.9
43	27	Noah Hoffman	United States	1:15:58.5	+2:49.2
44	45	Mark Starostin	Kazakhstan	1:16:21.8	+3:12.5
45	52	Akira Lenting	Japan	1:16:24.1	+3:14.8
46	57	Eeri Vahtra	Estonia	1:16:40.7	+3:31.4
47	36	Andy Kühne	Germany	1:17:02.2	+3:52.9
48	63	Yerdos Akhmadiyev	Kazakhstan	1:17:02.6	+3:53.3
49	56	Veselin Tsinzov	Bulgaria	1:17:04.8	+3:55.5
50	64	Gennadiy Matviyenko	Kazakhstan	1:17:18.2	+4:08.9
50	58	Vitaliy Shtun	Ukraine	1:17:18.2	+4:08.9
52	34	Graham Nishikawa	Canada	1:17:18.9	+4:09.6
53	48	Tad Elliott	United States	1:17:36.6	+4:27.3
54	39	Sami Jauhojärvi	Finland	1:17:54.7	+4:45.4
55	55	Myroslav Bilosyuk	Ukraine	1:18:16.1	+5:06.8
56	66	Andrew Young	Great Britain	1:18:19.5	+5:10.2
57	65	Philipp Hälg	Liechtenstein	1:18:19.6	+5:10.3
58	40	Karel Tammjärv	Estonia	1:18:26.7	+5:17.4
59	62	Sergey Mikayelyan	Armenia	1:19:04.3	+5:55.0
60	60	Nils Koons	New Zealand	1:19:17.5	+6:08.2
61	54	Alexander Lasutkin	Belarus	1:19:18.4	+6:09.1
62	61	Javier Gutiérrez	Spain	1:19:48.7	+6:39.4
63	68	Yury Astapenka	Belarus	1:20:17.3	+7:08.0
64	67	Oleksiy Shvidkiy	Ukraine	1:20:20.2	+7:10.9
65	73	Xu Wenlong	China	1:20:20.9	+7:11.6
66	59	Ondřej Horyna	Czech Republic	1:20:23.9	+7:14.6
67	69	Imanol Rojo	Spain	1:20:25.5	+7:16.2
68	75	Callum Watson	Australia	1:20:31.6	+7:22.3
69	78	Andrew Pohl	New Zealand	1:20:48.2	+7:38.9
70	84	Callum Smith	Great Britain	1:22:01.3	+8:52.0
71	74	Vytautas Strolia	Lithuania	1:22:22.2	+9:12.9
72	85	Artur Yeghoyan	Armenia	1:22:22.9	+9:13.6
73	71	Edi Dadić	Croatia	1:23:20.7	+10:11.4
	70	Petrică Hogiu	Romania	LAP	
	77	Andrej Burić	Croatia	LAP	
	79	Viorel Andrei Palici	Romania	LAP	
	80	Zhou Hu	China	LAP	
	81	Tadevos Poghosyan	Armenia	LAP	
	82	Brynjar Leo Kristinsson	Iceland	LAP	
	83	Lukas Jakeliunas	Lithuania	LAP	
	86	Federico Pablo Cichero	Argentina	LAP	
	88	Paul Kovacs	Australia	LAP	
	89	Mark van der Ploeg	Australia	LAP	
	90	Cesar Baena	Venezuela	LAP	
	91	Viossi-Akpedje Madja	Togo	LAP	
	93	Boldyn Byambadorj	Mongolia	LAP	
	94	Dachhiri Sherpa	Nepal	LAP	
	35	Sergei Dolidovich	Belarus	DNF	
	72	Oleksiy Krasovsky	Ukraine	DNF	
	76	Roberts Slotiņš	Latvia	DNF	
	92	Bayaraagiin Gerelt-Od	Mongolia	DNF	
	25	Devon Kershaw	Canada	DNS	
	49	Erik Bjornsen	United States	DNS	
	87	Alexander Standen	Great Britain	DNS	
