= FIS Nordic World Ski Championships 2013 – Men's 15 kilometre freestyle =

Men's 15 kilometre freestyle at the FIS Nordic World Ski Championships 2013
- Date: 27 February 2013
- Competitors: 98 from 34 nations
- Winning time: 34:37.1

Medalists
gold medal	Petter Northug	Norway
silver medal	Johan Olsson	Sweden
bronze medal	Tord Asle Gjerdalen	Norway

The Men's 15 kilometre freestyle at the FIS Nordic World Ski Championships 2013 was held on 27 February 2013. A 10 km qualifying event took place on 20 February.

== Results ==
=== Race ===
The race started at 12:45.

Rank	Bib	Athlete	Country	Time	Deficit
1st place, gold medalist(s)	89	Petter Northug	Norway	34:37.1	
2nd place, silver medalist(s)	77	Johan Olsson	Sweden	34:48.9	+11.8
3rd place, bronze medalist(s)	71	Tord Asle Gjerdalen	Norway	34:59.4	+22.3
4	69	Ivan Babikov	Canada	35:30.7	+53.6
5	87	Sjur Røthe	Norway	35:40.1	+1:03.0
6	63	Calle Halfvarsson	Sweden	35:46.6	+1:09.5
7	39	Aivar Rehemaa	Estonia	35:49.5	+1:12.4
8	95	Dario Cologna	Switzerland	35:58.2	+1:21.1
9	37	Axel Teichmann	Germany	36:02.8	+1:25.7
10	50	Daniel Rickardsson	Sweden	36:03.9	+1:26.8
11	67	Curdin Perl	Switzerland	36:12.6	+1:35.5
12	65	Matti Heikkinen	Finland	36:16.8	+1:39.7
13	55	David Hofer	Italy	36:25.0	+1:47.9
14	59	Tim Tscharnke	Germany	36:25.9	+1:48.8
15	48	Noah Hoffman	United States	36:27.1	+1:50.0
16	36	Toni Livers	Switzerland	36:34.0	+1:56.9
17	83	Marcus Hellner	Sweden	36:46.3	+2:09.2
18	79	Maurice Manificat	France	36:49.2	+2:12.1
19	73	Lukáš Bauer	Czech Republic	36:50.8	+2:13.7
20	34	Lari Lehtonen	Finland	36:56.2	+2:19.1
21	75	Roland Clara	Italy	37:01.1	+2:24.0
22	19	Aliaksei Ivanou	Belarus	37:04.1	+2:27.0
23	41	Aleš Razým	Czech Republic	37:04.5	+2:27.4
24	61	Hannes Dotzler	Germany	37:04.8	+2:27.7
25	93	Alexander Legkov	Russia	37:05.8	+2:28.7
26	16	Ville Nousiainen	Finland	37:11.3	+2:34.2
27	32	Jiří Magál	Czech Republic	37:12.8	+2:35.7
28	22	Andrew Musgrave	Great Britain	37:16.3	+2:39.2
29	42	Mathias Wibault	France	37:17.6	+2:40.5
30	47	Martin Jakš	Czech Republic	37:21.4	+2:44.3
31	49	Finn Haagen Krogh	Norway	37:28.3	+2:51.2
32	40	Fabio Clementi	Italy	37:29.7	+2:52.6
33	51	Devon Kershaw	Canada	37:31.1	+2:54.0
34	38	Remo Fischer	Switzerland	37:32.3	+2:55.2
34	28	Tad Elliott	United States	37:32.3	+2:55.2
36	17	Maciej Kreczmer	Poland	37:35.6	+2:58.5
37	29	Tero Similä	Finland	37:36.8	+2:59.7
38	46	Martin Bajčičák	Slovakia	37:40.3	+3:03.2
39	44	Graham Nishikawa	Canada	37:40.7	+3:03.6
40	91	Ilia Chernousov	Russia	37:45.8	+3:08.7
41	84	Philipp Hälg	Liechtenstein	37:48.5	+3:11.4
42	81	Tobias Angerer	Germany	37:48.9	+3:11.8
43	53	Johannes Dürr	Austria	37:49.3	+3:12.2
44	35	Robin Duvillard	France	37:51.4	+3:14.3
45	13	Max Hauke	Austria	37:56.2	+3:19.1
46	15	Alexander Lasutkin	Belarus	37:57.8	+3:20.7
47	45	Sergey Ustiugov	Russia	38:02.9	+3:25.8
48	25	Erik Bjornsen	United States	38:04.6	+3:27.5
49	94	Vitaliy Shtun	Ukraine	38:05.8	+3:28.7
50	18	Yevgeniy Velichko	Kazakhstan	38:07.0	+3:29.9
51	26	Bernhard Tritscher	Austria	38:08.6	+3:31.5
52	30	Michail Semenov	Belarus	38:26.2	+3:49.1
53	80	Andrew Young	Great Britain	38:29.9	+3:52.8
54	27	Nobu Naruse	Japan	38:40.2	+4:03.1
55	86	Sergey Mikayelyan	Armenia	38:40.7	+4:03.6
56	24	Paul Constantin Pepene	Romania	38:43.7	+4:06.6
57	85	Maxim Vylegzhanin	Russia	38:52.2	+4:15.1
57	70	Maciej Staręga	Poland	38:52.2	+4:15.1
59	33	Thomas Moriggl	Italy	38:52.7	+4:15.6
60	14	Myroslav Bilosyuk	Ukraine	38:58.2	+4:21.1
61	43	Sergei Dolidovich	Belarus	38:58.7	+4:21.6
62	62	Denis Volotka	Kazakhstan	38:59.1	+4:22.0
63	23	Nikolay Chebotko	Kazakhstan	39:12.2	+4:35.1
64	7	Andrew Pohl	New Zealand	39:17.5	+4:40.4
65	54	Xu Wenlong	China	39:23.4	+4:46.3
66	31	Mark Starostin	Kazakhstan	39:23.6	+4:46.5
67	56	Ruslan Perekhoda	Ukraine	39:24.9	+4:47.8
68	6	Viorel Andrei Palici	Romania	39:31.1	+4:54.0
69	90	Nils Koons	New Zealand	39:37.2	+5:00.1
70	21	Akira Lenting	Japan	39:48.2	+5:11.1
71	82	Ioseba Rojo	Spain	40:24.3	+5:47.2
72	10	Callum Watson	Australia	40:26.5	+5:49.4
73	60	Sebastian Gazurek	Poland	40:27.7	+5:50.6
74	88	Javier Gutiérrez	Spain	40:28.0	+5:50.9
75	64	Edi Dadić	Croatia	40:28.2	+5:51.1
76	8	Peter Mlynár	Slovakia	40:29.0	+5:51.9
77	78	Oleksiy Shvidkiy	Ukraine	40:33.0	+5:55.9
78	12	Veselin Tzinzov	Bulgaria	40:39.2	+6:02.1
79	76	Lasse Mølgård	Denmark	40:51.2	+6:14.1
80	11	Eeri Vahtra	Estonia	40:51.9	+6:14.8
81	74	Imanol Rojo	Spain	40:53.7	+6:16.6
82	58	Jan Antolec	Poland	41:01.8	+6:24.7
83	5	Martin Møller	Denmark	41:15.2	+6:38.1
84	68	Petrică Hogiu	Romania	41:41.6	+7:04.5
85	66	Peeter Kümmel	Estonia	41:44.3	+7:07.2
86	92	Vicenç Vilarrubla	Spain	41:49.1	+7:12.0
87	72	Arvis Liepiņš	Latvia	42:03.9	+7:26.8
88	1	Øystein Slettemark	Denmark	42:08.5	+7:31.4
89	52	Vytautas Strolia	Lithuania	42:28.1	+7:51.0
90	4	Zhou Hu	China	42:43.3	+8:06.2
91	2	Alexander Standen	Great Britain	42:54.9	+8:17.8
92	3	Artur Yeghoyan	Armenia	44:39.9	+10:02.8
	9	Roberts Slotiņš	Latvia	DNF	
	20	Aurelius Herburger	Austria	DNF	
	57	Jean-Marc Gaillard	France	DNF	

=== Qualification ===
The Qualification was held at 10:45.

Rank	Bib	Athlete	Country	Time	Deficit	Notes
1	69	Viorel Andrei Palici	Romania	24:53.2		Q
2	7	Pavel Andreiv	Kyrgyzstan	25:17.3	+24.1	Q
3	67	Martin Møller	Denmark	25:28.8	+35.6	Q
4	55	Artur Yeghoyan	Armenia	25:35.2	+42.0	Q
5	71	Andrew Pohl	New Zealand	25:37.7	+44.5	Q
6	36	Karolis Zlatkauskas	Lithuania	25:40.4	+47.2	Q
7	65	Zhou Hu	China	25:42.5	+49.3	Q
8	51	Alexander Standen	Great Britain	25:44.5	+51.3	Q
9	48	Mladen Plakalović	Bosnia and Herzegovina	25:51.3	+58.1	Q
10	46	Øystein Slettemark	Denmark	26:05.4	+1:12.2	Q
11	47	Sattar Seid	Iran	26:06.4	+1:13.2	
12	63	Phillip Bellingham	Australia	26:07.8	+1:14.6	
13	60	Lukas Jakeliunas	Lithuania	26:07.9	+1:14.7	
14	58	Lasse Hulgaard	Denmark	26:13.9	+1:20.7	
15	64	Tadevos Poghosyan	Armenia	26:14.5	+1:21.3	
16	56	Callum Smith	Great Britain	26:15.4	+1:22.2	
16	54	Darko Damjanovski	Macedonia	26:15.4	+1:22.2	
18	35	Nemanja Košarac	Bosnia and Herzegovina	26:21.5	+1:28.3	
19	37	Milan Szabó	Hungary	26:24.4	+1:31.2	
20	53	Dzevad Hadzifejzović	Serbia	26:27.5	+1:34.3	
21	41	Mark van der Ploeg	Australia	26:30.9	+1:37.7	
22	27	Károly Gombos	Hungary	26:32.1	+1:38.9	
23	45	Sanjin Dezdarević	Serbia	26:35.3	+1:42.1	
24	62	Brynjar Leo Kristinsson	Iceland	26:40.1	+1:46.9	
25	28	Apostolos Aggelis	Greece	26:41.6	+1:48.4	
26	61	Imre Tagscherer	Hungary	26:58.9	+2:05.7	
27	57	Arnis Pētersons	Latvia	27:02.3	+2:09.1	
28	72	Andrej Burić	Croatia	27:03.7	+2:10.5	
29	24	Thorsten Langer	Belgium	27:07.9	+2:14.7	
30	40	Olegs Andrejevs	Latvia	27:09.7	+2:16.5	
31	49	Paul Kovacs	Australia	27:10.4	+2:17.2	
32	59	Carlos Lannes	Argentina	27:19.5	+2:26.3	
33	52	Federico Pablo Cichero	Argentina	27:25.2	+2:32.0	
34	4	Evgeni Kirilov	Kyrgyzstan	27:31.1	+2:37.9	
35	14	Marijus Butrimavicius	Lithuania	27:45.4	+2:52.2	
36	17	Dimitrios Kappas	Greece	27:47.6	+2:54.4	
37	38	Goran Košarac	Bosnia and Herzegovina	27:49.5	+2:56.3	
38	66	Pavels Ribakovs	Latvia	27:57.0	+3:03.8	
38	44	Ajlan Rastić	Serbia	27:57.0	+3:03.8	
40	23	Victor Pinzaru	Moldova	27:58.6	+3:05.4	
41	39	Yasin Shemshaki	Iran	28:00.3	+3:07.1	
42	31	Myasnik Gharibyan	Armenia	28:06.9	+3:13.7	
43	21	Stephan Langer	Belgium	28:15.2	+3:22.0	
44	25	Kleanthis Karamichas	Greece	28:20.8	+3:27.6	
45	30	Alexis Gkounko	Greece	28:25.6	+3:32.4	
46	43	Reinis Korsunovs	Latvia	28:27.4	+3:34.2	
47	3	Marijus Rindzevicius	Lithuania	28:27.9	+3:34.7	
48	26	Abolfazl Savei	Iran	28:39.5	+3:46.3	
49	29	Toni Stanoeski	Macedonia	28:40.8	+3:47.6	
50	42	Sævar Birgisson	Iceland	28:48.3	+3:55.1	
51	6	Bayaraagiin Gerelt-Od	Mongolia	28:59.4	+4:06.2	
52	32	Leandro Ribela	Brazil	28:59.6	+4:06.4	
53	22	Tumur Dorjgotov	Mongolia	29:01.9	+4:08.7	
54	34	Marko Starčević	Bosnia and Herzegovina	29:16.1	+4:22.9	
55	19	Alireza Moghdid	Iran	29:23.1	+4:29.9	
56	33	Marton Pálfy	Hungary	29:37.5	+4:44.3	
57	8	Bold Byambadorj	Mongolia	29:39.7	+4:46.5	
58	20	Toso Stanoeski	Macedonia	29:56.0	+5:02.8	
59	18	Sote Andreski	Macedonia	30:20.4	+5:27.2	
60	10	Sveatoslav Maliutin	Moldova	30:31.0	+5:37.8	
61	5	Dachhiri Sherpa	Nepal	30:53.0	+5:59.8	
62	11	Jagdish Singh	India	31:13.6	+6:20.4	
63	1	Colum O'Farrell	Ireland	31:14.5	+6:21.3	
64	16	Nadeem Iqbal	India	31:32.4	+6:39.2	
65	15	Roberto Carcelen	Peru	31:53.7	+7:00.5	
66	50	Ivan Burgov	Bulgaria	33:01.1	+8:07.9	
	2	Conor McLaughlin	Ireland	DNS		
	9	Liviu Dubalari	Moldova	DNS		
	12	Nicolae Gaiduc	Moldova	DNS		
	13	César Baena	Venezuela	DNS		
	68	Sun Qinghai	China	DNS		
	70	Rejhan Smrkovic	Serbia	DNF		
