= FIS Nordic World Ski Championships 2013 – Men's 50 kilometre classical =

Championship

Men's 50 kilometer classical at the FIS Nordic World Ski Championships 2013
- Date: 3 March 2013
- Competitors: 73 from 25 nations
- Winning time: 2:10:41.4

Medalists
gold medal	Johan Olsson	Sweden
silver medal	Dario Cologna	Switzerland
bronze medal	Alexey Poltoranin	Kazakhstan

The Men's 50 kilometer classical at the FIS Nordic World Ski Championships 2013 was held on 3 March 2013.[1]

== Results ==
The race was started at 12:30.

Rank	Bib	Athlete	Country	Time	Deficit
1st place, gold medalist(s)	10	Johan Olsson	Sweden	2:10:41.4	
2nd place, silver medalist(s)	1	Dario Cologna	Switzerland	2:10:54.3	+12.9
3rd place, bronze medalist(s)	3	Alexey Poltoranin	Kazakhstan	2:10:58.2	+16.8
4	2	Alexander Legkov	Russia	2:11:00.9	+19.5
5	23	Eldar Rønning	Norway	2:11:01.6	+20.2
6	38	Tord Asle Gjerdalen	Norway	2:11:13.7	+32.3
7	19	Hannes Dotzler	Germany	2:11:14.1	+32.7
8	6	Maxim Vylegzhanin	Russia	2:11:16.0	+34.6
9	13	Jens Filbrich	Germany	2:11:19.9	+38.5
10	25	Daniel Rickardsson	Sweden	2:11:22.7	+41.3
11	22	Dmitriy Yaparov	Russia	2:11:23.6	+42.2
12	34	Keishin Yoshida	Japan	2:11:25.6	+44.2
13	8	Tobias Angerer	Germany	2:11:26.8	+45.4
14	24	Petter Eliassen	Norway	2:11:36.2	+54.8
15	28	Anders Södergren	Sweden	2:11:40.5	+59.1
16	11	Lukáš Bauer	Czech Republic	2:11:41.4	+1:00.0
17	5	Sjur Røthe	Norway	2:11:49.6	+1:08.2
18	31	Dietmar Nöckler	Italy	2:11:52.8	+1:11.4
19	12	Giorgio Di Centa	Italy	2:12:10.5	+1:29.1
20	42	Jiří Magál	Czech Republic	2:12:30.6	+1:49.2
21	4	Petter Northug	Norway	2:12:42.3	+2:00.9
22	41	Lari Lehtonen	Finland	2:12:52.2	+2:10.8
23	14	Alexander Bessmertnykh	Russia	2:13:32.2	+2:50.8
24	9	Maurice Manificat	France	2:13:41.1	+2:59.7
25	18	Matti Heikkinen	Finland	2:14:11.7	+3:30.3
26	30	Martin Jakš	Czech Republic	2:14:46.1	+4:04.7
27	26	Noah Hoffman	United States	2:15:00.5	+4:19.1
28	16	Alex Harvey	Canada	2:15:12.8	+4:31.4
29	7	Marcus Hellner	Sweden	2:15:23.9	+4:42.5
30	36	Sami Jauhojärvi	Finland	2:16:19.7	+5:38.3
31	35	Mathias Wibault	France	2:16:28.2	+5:46.8
32	17	Curdin Perl	Switzerland	2:16:34.8	+5:53.4
33	56	Gennadiy Matviyenko	Kazakhstan	2:16:44.5	+6:03.1
34	32	Martin Bajčičák	Slovakia	2:17:17.5	+6:36.1
35	43	Tero Similä	Finland	2:17:32.9	+6:51.5
36	29	Valerio Checchi	Italy	2:18:02.5	+7:21.1
37	27	Kris Freeman	United States	2:18:18.6	+7:37.2
38	40	Mattia Pellegrin	Italy	2:19:33.5	+8:52.1
39	37	Karel Tammjärv	Estonia	2:20:21.2	+9:39.8
40	44	Tad Elliott	United States	2:20:50.8	+10:09.4
41	46	Andrew Musgrave	Great Britain	2:20:58.5	+10:17.1
42	47	Aliaksei Ivanou	Belarus	2:21:01.2	+10:19.8
43	39	Aivar Rehemaa	Estonia	2:21:48.5	+11:07.1
44	20	Andy Kühne	Germany	2:21:59.5	+11:18.1
45	55	Yerdos Akhmadiyev	Kazakhstan	2:22:01.2	+11:19.8
46	50	Ondřej Horyna	Czech Republic	2:22:30.6	+11:49.2
47	53	Algo Kärp	Estonia	2:23:02.9	+12:21.5
48	33	Graham Nishikawa	Canada	2:23:41.7	+13:00.3
49	51	Raido Ränkel	Estonia	2:24:06.6	+13:25.2
50	57	Ioseba Rojo	Spain	2:24:18.8	+13:37.4
51	54	Javier Gutiérrez	Spain	2:24:31.0	+13:49.6
52	45	Erik Bjornsen	United States	2:25:55.8	+15:14.4
53	61	Xu Wenlong	China	2:27:06.6	+16:25.2
54	58	Andrew Young	Great Britain	2:28:29.6	+17:48.2
55	52	Nils Koons	New Zealand	2:29:50.3	+19:08.9
56	59	Oleksiy Shvidkiy	Ukraine	2:30:26.5	+19:45.1
57	60	Yury Astapenka	Belarus	2:31:00.5	+20:19.1
58	49	Alexandr Malyshev	Kazakhstan	2:33:38.8	+22:57.4
	63	Sun Qinghai	China	LAP	
	65	Aliaksandr Ionenkau	Belarus	LAP	
	66	Paul Kovacs	Australia	LAP	
	68	Janis Teteris	Latvia	LAP	
	69	Valdis Bodnieks	Latvia	LAP	
	70	Marijus Butrimavicius	Lithuania	LAP	
	71	Cesar Baena	Venezuela	LAP	
	72	Bernardo Baena	Venezuela	LAP	
	73	Marijus Rindzevicius	Lithuania	LAP	
	15	Ivan Babikov	Canada	DNF	
	21	Jean-Marc Gaillard	France	DNF	
	48	Vitaliy Shtun	Ukraine	DNF	
	62	Callum Watson	Australia	DNF	
	64	Zhou Hu	China	DNF	
	67	Vasyl Koval	Ukraine	DNF	
