= FIS Nordic World Ski Championships 2013 – Men's 4 × 10 kilometre relay =

Men's 4 × 10 kilometre relay at the FIS Nordic World Ski Championships 2013
- Date: 1 March 2013
- Competitors: 72 from 18 nations
- Winning time: 1:41:37.2

Medalists
gold medal	Tord Asle Gjerdalen; Eldar Rønning; Sjur Røthe; Petter Northug	Norway
silver medal	Daniel Rickardsson; Johan Olsson; Marcus Hellner; Calle Halfvarsson	Sweden
bronze medal	Evgeniy Belov; Maxim Vylegzhanin; Alexander Legkov; Sergey Ustiugov	Russia

The men's 4 x 10 kilometre relay at the FIS Nordic World Ski Championships 2013 was held on 1 March 2013.

== Results ==
The race started at 13:30.

Rank	Bib	Country	Athlete	Time	Deficit
1st place, gold medalist(s)	1	Norway	Tord Asle Gjerdalen; Eldar Rønning; Sjur Røthe; Petter Northug	1:41:37.2; 27:13.7; 26:34.3; 23:30.0; 24:19.2	
2nd place, silver medalist(s)	2	Sweden	Daniel Rickardsson; Johan Olsson; Marcus Hellner; Calle Halfvarsson	1:41:38.4; 27:17.1; 26:31.6; 23:27.9; 24:21.8	+1.2
3rd place, bronze medalist(s)	7	Russia	Evgeniy Belov; Maxim Vylegzhanin; Alexander Legkov; Sergey Ustiugov	1:41:39.6; 27:31.7; 26:15.5; 23:28.8; 24:23.6	+2.4
4	5	Italy	Dietmar Nöckler; Giorgio di Centa; Roland Clara; David Hofer	1:41:39.8; 27:18.8; 26:26.4; 23:33.1; 24:21.5	+02.6
5	4	Finland	Sami Jauhojärvi; Ville Nousiainen; Lari Lehtonen; Matti Heikkinen	1:41:48.9; 27:18.0; 27:34.8; 23:49.0; 23:07.1	+11.7
6	9	Switzerland	Curdin Perl; Dario Cologna; Toni Livers; Remo Fischer	1:41:50.2; 27:32.2; 26:12.4; 23:55.3; 24:10.3	+13.0
7	3	Germany	Hannes Dotzler; Tobias Angerer; Tim Tscharnke; Axel Teichmann	1:42:22.7; 27:13.4; 26:34.2; 23:43.1; 24:52.0	+45.5
8	6	Japan	Hiroyuki Miyazawa; Keishin Yoshida; Nobu Naruse; Akira Lenting	1:42:31.4; 27:16.7; 26:56.7; 23:58.4; 24:19.6	+54.2
9	11	France	Mathias Wibault; Maurice Manificat; Robin Duvillard; Ivan Perrillat Boiteux	1:42:32.8; 27:23.9; 27:27.6; 23:23.3; 24:18.0	+55.6
10	14	United States	Andrew Newell; Kris Freeman; Noah Hoffman; Tad Elliott	1:42:38.6; 27:17.5; 27:27.3; 23:30.3; 24:23.5	+1:01.4
11	8	Czech Republic	Jiří Magál; Lukáš Bauer; Aleš Razym; Martin Jakš	1:42:42.6; 27:23.6; 26:49.3; 24:22.8; 24:06.9	+1:05.4
12	12	Canada	Len Väljas; Devon Kershaw; Ivan Babikov; Alex Harvey	1:44:16.5; 27:25.0; 28:06.9; 24:25.6; 24:19.0	+2:39.3
13	13	Kazakhstan	Sergey Cherepanov; Alexey Poltoranin; Nikolay Chebotko; Yevgeniy Velichko	1:44:52.7; 29:00.6; 27:04.8; 24:14.1; 24:33.2	+3:15.5
14	16	Belarus	Michail Semenov; Sergei Dolidovich; Aliaksei Ivanou; Alexander Lasutkin	1:45:03.5; 27:24.7; 28:48.3; 24:09.3; 24:41.2	+3:26.3
15	10	Estonia	Peeter Kümmel; Karel Tammjärv; Eeri Vahtra; Aivar Rehemaa	1:47:19.2; 28:39.9; 28:42.3; 24:54.4; 25:02.6	+5:42.0
16	18	Poland	Maciej Kreczmer; Sebastian Gazurek; Maciej Staręga; Jan Antolec	1:48:01.7; 27:30.3; 28:42.1; 26:01.6; 25:47.7	+6:24.5
17	17	Ukraine	Vitaliy Shtun; Oleksiy Krasovsky; Myroslav Bilosyuk; Ruslan Perekhoda	1:48:20.6; 27:30.9; 29:52.3; 25:03.6; 25:53.8	+6:43.4
	15	Denmark	Lasse Mølgaard; Karl Peter Kristensen; Lasse Hulgaard; Rasmus Jensen	DNF; 30:04.6	
