= Ruslan Perekhoda =

Ukrainian cross-country skier (born 1987)

Personal information
- Born: 18 July 1987 (age 39) Staryi Saltiv, Kharkiv Oblast, Ukrainian SSR
- Height: 182 cm (6 ft 0 in)

Sport
- Sport: Skiing

World Cup career
- Seasons: 2011-
- Updated on January 20, 2022

Ruslan Yuriyovych Perekhoda (Ukrainian: Руслан Юрійович Перехода, born July 18, 1987) is a cross-country skier from Ukraine. He represented Ukraine at the 2014 Winter Olympics.

== Career ==
Perekhoda started his career at major competitions in March 2007 when he competed at the 2007 Junior World Ski Championships in Tarvisio, Italy. His World Cup debut took place on November 25, 2011, in Kuusamo, Finland, where he was 84th in sprint competition. As of January 2022, his best World Cup achievement was 26th rank in sprint freestyle in Sochi on February 1, 2013. His best team performance (together with Vitaliy Shtun, Myroslav Bilosyuk, and Oleksiy Shvidkiy) was 19th in relay on November 25, 2012, in Gällivare.

Olympic debut occurred at the 2014 Winter Games in Russian Sochi. There Perekhoda was 50th in sprint and 20th in team sprint (together with Oleksii Krasovskyi) competitions. He did not qualify to represent Ukraine at the 2018 Winter Olympics.

In 2022, Ruslan Perekhoda was nominated for his second Winter Games in Beijing.

Perekhoda participated at five World Championships: in 2013, 2015, 2017, 2019, and 2021. His best personal performance was 49th in sprint in 2017. He also took part in four Universiades (2009, 2011, 2013, and 2015), with his best personal result being 16th in 30 km free style mass start in 2015.

== Career results ==
=== Winter Olympics ===
Year	Host	Freestyle	Skiathlon	Classical	Relay	Sprint	Team sprint
2014	Sochi, Russia					50	20
2022	Beijing, China		64	78		46	17

=== World Championships ===
Year	Event	Freestyle	Skiathlon	Classical	Relay	Sprint	Team sprint
2013	Val di Fiemme, Italy	67			17	56	19
2015	Falun, Sweden	73			17	56	19
2017	Kontiolahti, Finland			77	16	49	17
2019	Seefeld, Austria	59			14		
2021	Oberstdorf, Germany	79	DNF			63	21

=== World Cup ===
==== Rankings ====
Season	Overall	Distance	Sprint
2012–13	158	—	100
