= Biathlon at the 2013 Winter Universiade =

Biathlon at the 2013 Winter Universiade was held at the Stadio del Fondo di Lago di Tesero in Tesero from December 13 to December 20, 2013.

== Men's events ==
Event	Gold		Silver		Bronze	
10 km sprint	Milanko Petrović; Serbia	25:29.5	Vitaliy Kilchytskyy; Ukraine	25:33.0	Dmytro Pidruchnyi; Ukraine	25:38.2
12.5 km pursuit	Aleksandr Pechenkin; Russia	35:09.9	Sergei Kliachin; Russia	35:10.7	Alexei Almoukov; Australia	35:10.7
15 km mass start	Dmytro Pidruchnyi; Ukraine	39:00.8	Tomáš Krupčík; Czech Republic	39:29.2	Dmitrii Elkhin; Russia	39:31.3
20 km individual	Sergei Kliachin; Russia	51:56.7	Aleksandr Mingalev; Russia	53:28.0	Milanko Petrović; Serbia	53:36.1

- Russian Aleksandr Pechenkin, who finished first in pursuit, was later disqualified by the IBU because of an anti-doping rule violation. However, there were no decision on medal reallocation regarding the results of the Universiade.

== Women's events ==
Event	Gold		Silver		Bronze	
7.5 km sprint	Weronika Nowakowska-Ziemniak; Poland	22:44.8	Monika Hojnisz; Poland	22:55.4	Tatiana Semenova; Russia	23:31.2
10 km pursuit	Weronika Nowakowska-Ziemniak; Poland	33:05.6	Monika Hojnisz; Poland	33:31.7	Tatiana Semenova; Russia	33:46.3
12.5 km mass start	Jitka Landová; Czech Republic	38:41.8	Weronika Nowakowska-Ziemniak; Poland	38:42.0	Iryna Varvynets; Ukraine	39:37.8
15 km individual	Natália Prekopová; Slovakia	47:38.9	Weronika Nowakowska-Ziemniak; Poland	47:53.5	Jitka Landová; Czech Republic	48:00.2

== Mixed events ==
Event	Gold		Silver		Bronze	
2 x 6 km + 2 x 7.5 km relay	Russia (RUS); Larisa Kuznetsova; Tatiana Semenova; Sergei Kliachin; Aleksandr Pechenkin	1:28:25.6	Ukraine (UKR); Iryna Varvynets; Iana Bondar; Vitaliy Kilchytskyy; Dmytro Pidruchnyi	1:19:54.5	Czech Republic (CZE); Jitka Landová; Kristýna Černá; Michal Žák; Tomáš Krupčík	1:20:58.2

- Though Aleksandr Pechenkin was later disqualified by the IBU because of an anti-doping rule violation, there were no decision on the medal reallocation.

== Medal table ==
Rank	Nation	Gold	Silver	Bronze	Total
1	Russia	3	2	3	8
2	Poland	2	4	0	6
3	Ukraine	1	2	2	5
4	Czech Republic	1	1	2	4
5	Serbia	1	0	1	2
6	Slovakia	1	0	0	1
7	Australia	0	0	1	1
Totals (7 entries)		9	9	9	27
