= Johan Olsson (skier) =

Swedish cross-country skier

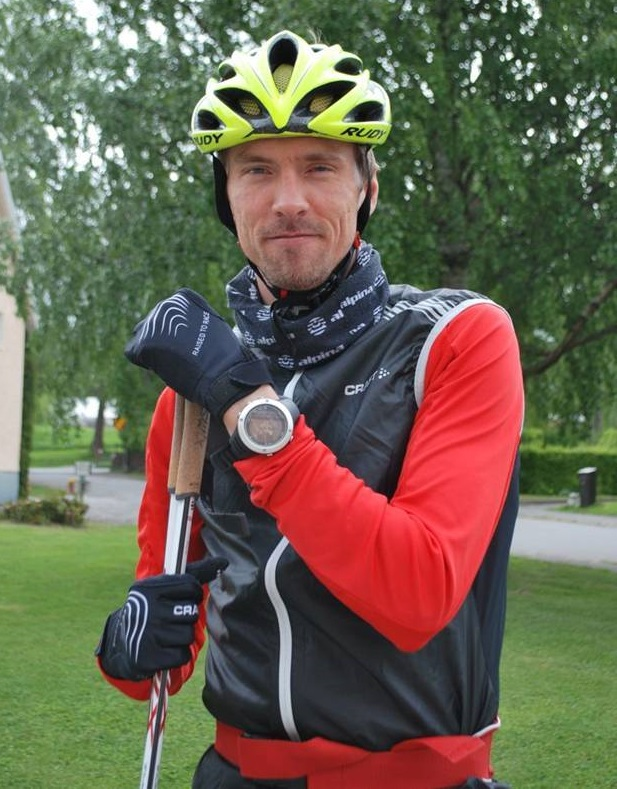
- Johan Olsson in 2013

Personal information
- Full name: Johan Arne Olsson
- Nationality: Sweden
- Born: 19 March 1980 (age 46) Skultuna, Sweden
- Height: 1.81 m (5 ft 11 in)
- Spouse: Anna Olsson (m. 2008)

Sport
- Sport: Skiing
- Club: Åsarna IK

World Cup career
- Seasons: 16 – (2001–2015, 2017)
- Indiv. starts: 101
- Indiv. podiums: 7
- Indiv. wins: 5
- Team starts: 25
- Team podiums: 9
- Team wins: 1
- Overall titles: 0 – (14th in 2009, 2012)
- Discipline titles: 0
Medal record
Men's cross-country skiing
Representing Sweden
Event	1st	2nd	3rd
Olympic Games	2	1	3
World Championships	2	4	2
Total	4	5	5
Olympic Games
Gold medal – first place	2010 Vancouver	4 × 10 km relay
Gold medal – first place	2014 Sochi	4 × 10 km relay
Silver medal – second place	2014 Sochi	15 km classical
Bronze medal – third place	2006 Turin	4 × 10 km relay
Bronze medal – third place	2010 Vancouver	30 km skiathlon
Bronze medal – third place	2010 Vancouver	50 km classical
World Championships
Gold medal – first place	2013 Val di Fiemme	50 km classical
Gold medal – first place	2015 Falun	15 km freestyle
Silver medal – second place	2011 Oslo	4 × 10 km relay
Silver medal – second place	2013 Val di Fiemme	15 km freestyle
Silver medal – second place	2013 Val di Fiemme	4 × 10 km relay
Silver medal – second place	2015 Falun	4 × 10 km relay
Bronze medal – third place	2015 Falun	50 km classical
Bronze medal – third place	2017 Lahti	4 × 10 km relay
U23 World Championships
Silver medal – second place	2003 Valdidentro	30 km classical
Junior World Championships
Silver medal – second place	2000 Štrbské Pleso	4 × 10 km relay

Johan Arne Olsson (born 19 March 1980) is a Swedish cross-country skiing coach and former skier. He is a two-time Olympic champion who raced from 1998 to 2017. Olsson won five individual FIS Cross-Country World Cup victories and two additional podium finishes during his career.

== Athletic career ==
Olsson became an Olympian in 2006 when he was selected to represent Sweden in the 2006 Winter Olympics in Turin. He earned a bronze medal in the 4 × 10 km relay and finished 6th in the 15 km event. At the 2010 Winter Olympics in Vancouver, Olsson earned a bronze medal in the 30 km pursuit after leading most of the race, and together with the Swedish team he won the gold medal on the 4 × 10 km relay after a deciding performance on the 2nd stage. During the same Olympic Games Olsson won another bronze medal in the 50 km event.

In the FIS Nordic World Ski Championships 2013 in Val di Fiemme, Olsson won the prestigious 50 km classical race. He pulled ahead of the pack after 20 km and never let go of his lead. It was an impressive solo performance to win Sweden's first gold medal on the 50 km in a big competition in over 20 years. Olsson also won silver on the 15 km freestyle, finishing 9 seconds behind Petter Northug.

At the 2014 Winter Olympics Olsson won a silver medal at the 15 km classical.

Olsson retired from skiing before the 2015–2016 season, but announced a comeback in April 2016 for the FIS Nordic World Ski Championships in Lahti. Olsson retired from professional skiing in April 2017.

On 12 April 2017, his second retirement from cross-country skiing was announced.

== Coaching career ==
In May 2018, it was announced that Olsson would become a coach for Team Sweden men's cross-country skiing, for the 2018–2019 season, together with Mattias Nilsson and Fredrik Uusitalo.

== Cross-country skiing results ==
All results are sourced from the International Ski Federation (FIS).

=== Olympic Games ===
- 6 medals – (2 gold, 1 silver, 3 bronze)

Year	Age	15 km individual	30 km skiathlon	50 km mass start	Sprint	4 × 10 km relay	Team sprint
2006	25	6	23	25	—	Bronze	—
2010	29	11	Bronze	Bronze	—	Gold	—
2014	33	Silver	—	9	—	Gold	—

=== World Championships ===
- 8 medals – (2 gold, 4 silver, 2 bronze)

Year	Age	15 km individual	30 km skiathlon	50 km mass start	Sprint	4 × 10 km relay	Team sprint
2005	24	46	21	19	—	7	—
2007	26	7	20	—	—	—	—
2009	28	8	16	—	—	6	—
2011	30	17	16	16	—	Silver	—
2013	32	Silver	—	Gold	—	Silver	—
2015	34	Gold	—	Bronze	—	Silver	—
2017	36	9	—	26	—	Bronze	—

=== World Cup ===
==== Season standings ====
Season	Age	Discipline standings			Ski Tour standings		
Season	Age	Overall	Distance	Sprint	Nordic Opening	Tour de Ski	World Cup Final
2001	21	NC	—N/a	—	—N/a	—N/a	—N/a
2002	22	NC	—N/a	—	—N/a	—N/a	—N/a
2003	23	NC	—N/a	—	—N/a	—N/a	—N/a
2004	24	78	52	—	—N/a	—N/a	—N/a
2005	25	55	33	—	—N/a	—N/a	—N/a
2006	26	74	50	—	—N/a	—N/a	—N/a
2007	27	61	36	—	—N/a	—	—N/a
2008	28	45	25	—	—N/a	—	—
2009	29	14	7	NC	—N/a	—	13
2010	30	38	17	NC	—N/a	—	DNF
2011	31	45	34	NC	7	DNF	—
2012	32	14	10	NC	5	—	—
2013	33	18	16	NC	—	9	DNF
2014	34	75	44	—	—	—	—
2015	35	94	54	—	—	—	—N/a
2017	37	69	40	—	—	—	—

==== Individual podiums ====
- 5 victories – (5 WC)
- 7 podiums – (7 WC)

No.	Season	Date	Location	Race	Level	Place
1	2008–09	13 December 2008	Davos, Switzerland	15 km Individual C	World Cup	1st
2	2008–09	24 January 2009	Otepää, Estonia	15 km Individual C	World Cup	2nd
3	2008–09	14 February 2009	Valdidentro, Italy	15 km Individual C	World Cup	3rd
4	2011–12	19 November 2011	Sjusjøen, Norway	15 km Individual F	World Cup	1st
5	2011–12	11 February 2012	Nové Město, Czech Republic	30 km Mass Start C	World Cup	1st
6	2011–12	18 February 2012	Szklarska Poręba, Poland	15 km Individual C	World Cup	1st
7	2012–13	17 February 2013	Davos, Switzerland	15 km Individual F	World Cup	1st

==== Team podiums ====
- 1 victory – (1 RL)
- 9 podiums – (9 RL)

No.	Season	Date	Location	Race	Level	Place	Teammates
1	2003–04	14 December 2003	Davos, Switzerland	4 × 10 km Relay C/F	World Cup	3rd	Larsson / Larsson / Högberg
2	2007–08	9 December 2007	Davos, Switzerland	4 × 10 km Relay C/F	World Cup	3rd	Larsson / Södergren / Hellner
3	2008–09	23 November 2008	Gällivare, Sweden	4 × 10 km Relay C/F	World Cup	2nd	Rickardsson / Andreasson / Hellner
4	2008–09	7 December 2008	La Clusaz, France	4 × 10 km Relay C/F	World Cup	2nd	Rickardsson / Södergren / Hellner
5	2010–11	21 November 2010	Gällivare, Sweden	4 × 10 km Relay C/F	World Cup	1st	Larsson / Rickardsson / Hellner
6	2011–12	20 November 2011	Sjusjøen, Norway	4 × 10 km Relay C/F	World Cup	3rd	Hellner / Rickardsson / Halfvarsson
7	2011–12	12 February 2012	Nové Město, Czech Republic	4 × 10 km Relay C/F	World Cup	2nd	Rickardsson / Södergren / Hellner
8	2012–13	25 November 2012	Gällivare, Sweden	4 × 7.5 km Relay C/F	World Cup	2nd	Jönsson / Rickardsson / Hellner
9	2012–13	20 January 2013	La Clusaz, France	4 × 7.5 km Relay C/F	World Cup	2nd	Rickardsson / Halfvarsson / Hellner
10	2016–17	21 January 2017	Ulricehamn, Sweden	4 × 7.5 km Relay C/F	World Cup	2nd	Rickardsson / Hellner / Halfvarsson

== Personal life ==
Olsson married his former teammate Anna Olsson (née Dahlberg) in 2008. Together they have two daughters, named Molly and Signe.
