= Monika Hojnisz-Staręga =

Polish biathlete

Monika Hojnisz
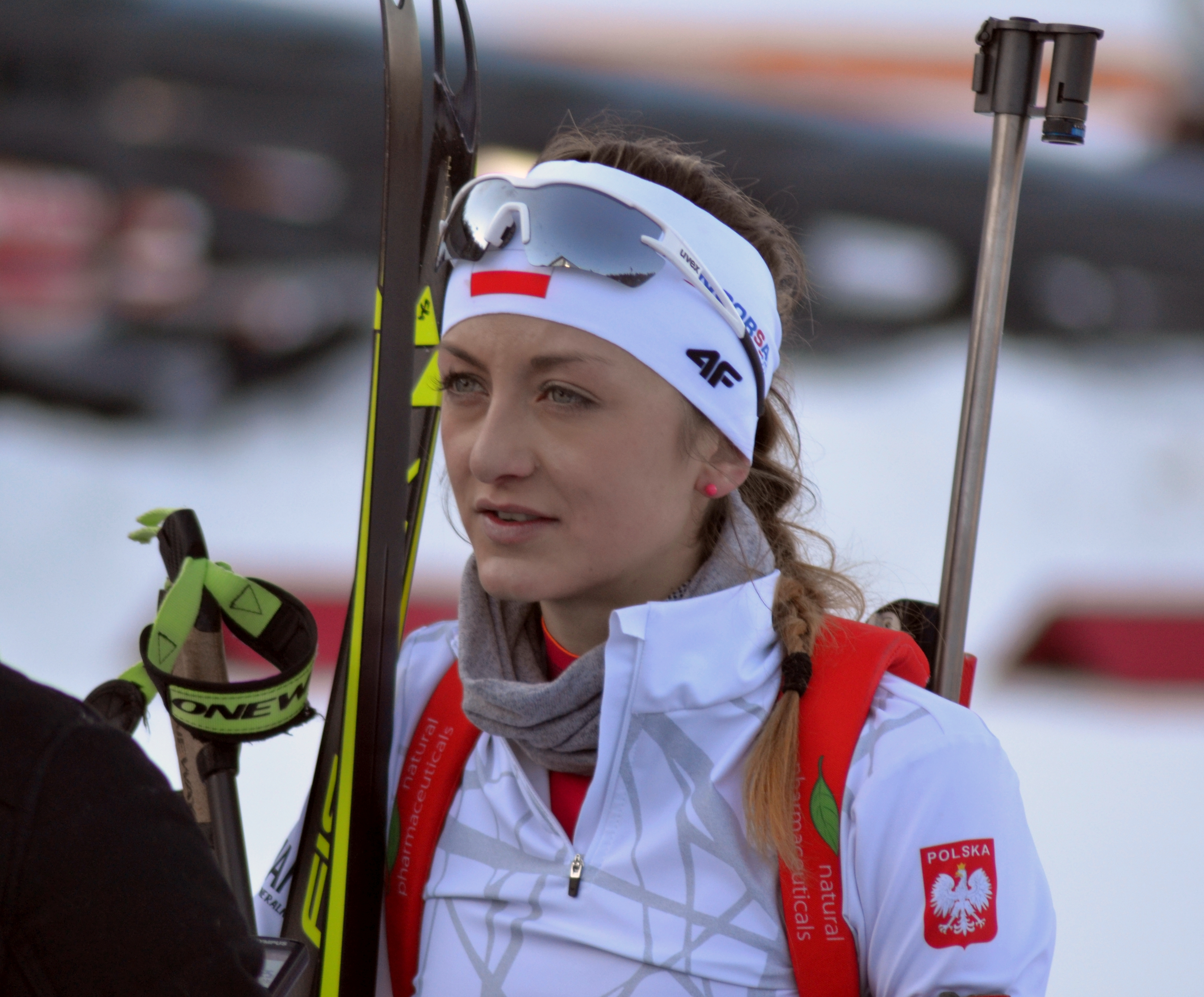
- Hojnisz in 2017

Personal information
- Born: 27 August 1991 (age 34) Chorzów, Poland
- Height: 1.67 m (5 ft 6 in)

Sport
- Sport: Skiing
- Club: UKS Lider Katowice

World Cup career
- Indiv. podiums: 2
- Indiv. wins: –
Medal record
Women's biathlon
Representing Poland
World Championships
Bronze medal – third place	2013 Nové Město	Mass start
Junior World Championships
Silver medal – second place	2012 Kontiolahti	12.5 km individual
Youth World Championships
Bronze medal – third place	2010 Torsby	6 km sprint
Bronze medal – third place	2010 Torsby	7.5 km pursuit
European Championships
Gold medal – first place	2021 Duszniki-Zdrój	Individual
Gold medal – first place	2013 Bansko	Pursuit
Bronze medal – third place	2013 Bansko	Individual
Bronze medal – third place	2013 Bansko	Sprint
Universiade
Silver medal – second place	2013 Trentino	Sprint
Silver medal – second place	2013 Trentino	Pursuit
- Updated on 17 February 2014

Monika Hojnisz (born 27 August 1991), now Monika Hojnisz-Staręga, is a Polish biathlete. She competes in the Biathlon World Cup. Hojnisz won a bronze medal at the Biathlon World Championships 2013 (12.5 km mass start). In December 2018 she scored her best World Cup finish, taking second place in the 15 km individual at the Pokljuka round of the World Cup. She finished sixth in the 15 km individual at the 2018 Winter Olympics in Pyeongchang.

She married Polish cross-county skier Maciej Staręga in June 2019.

== Biathlon results ==
All results are sourced from the International Biathlon Union.

=== Olympic Games ===
0 medals

Event	Individual	Sprint	Pursuit	Mass Start	Relay	Mixed Relay
(Russia) 2014 Sochi	12th	21st	19th	5th	10th	–
(South Korea) 2018 Pyeongchang	6th	45th	43rd	15th	7th	–
(China) 2022 Beijing	20th	16th	9th	27th	14th	–

*The mixed relay was added as an event in 2014.

=== World Championships ===
1 medal (1 bronze)

Event	Individual	Sprint	Pursuit	Mass Start	Relay	Mixed Relay	Single mixed relay
(Russia) 2011 Khanty-Mansiysk	59th	68th	–	–	9th	–	—N/a
(Czech Republic) 2013 Nové Město	–	24th	13th	Bronze	9th	–	—N/a
(Finland) 2015 Kontiolahti	9th	74th	–	–	12th	–	—N/a
(Norway) 2016 Oslo	40th	44th	29th	–	4th	–	—N/a
(Austria) 2017 Hochfilzen	30th	39th	51st	–	7th	–	—N/a
(Sweden) 2019 Östersund	39th	34th	DNS	13th	7th	–	–
(Italy) 2020 Antholz-Anterselva	6th	28th	26th	4th	7th	–	–
(Slovenia) 2021 Pokljuka	16th	30th	16th	22nd	6th	–	–

*During Olympic seasons competitions are only held for those events not included in the Olympic program.
**The single mixed relay was added as an event in 2019.

=== World Cup ===
Season	Age	Overall		Sprint		Pursuit		Individual		Mass start	
Season	Age	Points	Position	Points	Position	Points	Position	Points	Position	Points	Position
2010–11	19	27	75th	8	77th	0	–	19	47th	0	–
2011–12	20	22	70th	0	–	22	53rd	0	–	0	–
2012–13	21	179	37th	81	33rd	50	39th	0	–	48	32nd
2013–14	22	148	43rd	53	51st	66	41st	29	22nd	0	–
2014–15	23	248	29th	111	27th	55	36th	72	13th	10	43rd
2015–16	24	306	26th	119	24th	80	34th	26	34th	81	21st
2016–17	25	225	36th	85	36th	65	38th	47	21st	28	38th
2017–18	26	13	82nd	7	82nd	6	74th	0	–	0	–
2018–19	27	567	10th	238	6th	159	15th	66	13th	104	18th
2019–20	28	500	12th	162	14th	91	19th	96	7th	151	7th
