= Rikard Andreasson =

Swedish cross country skier

Personal information
- Nationality: Sweden
- Born: 22 January 1979 (age 47)

Sport
- Sport: Skiing
- Club: Laisvalls SK

World Cup career
- Seasons: 9 – (2001–2003, 2006–2011)
- Indiv. starts: 19
- Indiv. podiums: 0
- Team starts: 12
- Team podiums: 1
- Team wins: 0
- Overall titles: 0 – (96th in 2006)
- Discipline titles: 0

Rikard Andreasson (born 22 January 1979) is a Swedish cross-country skier who has competed since 2000. His best World Cup finish was second in the 4 × 10 km relay at Sweden in November 2008.

== Cross-country skiing results ==
All results are sourced from the International Ski Federation (FIS).

=== World Cup ===
==== Season standings ====
Season	Age	Discipline standings			Ski Tour standings		
Season	Age	Overall	Distance	Sprint	Nordic Opening	Tour de Ski	World Cup Final
2001	22	NC	—N/a	—	—N/a	—N/a	—N/a
2002	23	NC	—N/a	—	—N/a	—N/a	—N/a
2003	24	NC	—N/a	—	—N/a	—N/a	—N/a
2006	27	96	65	—	—N/a	—N/a	—N/a
2007	28	NC	NC	—	—N/a	—	—N/a
2008	29	NC	NC	—	—N/a	—	—
2009	30	NC	NC	—	—N/a	—	—
2010	31	NC	NC	—	—N/a	—	—
2011	32	NC	NC	—	—	—	—

==== Team podiums ====
- 1 podium

No.	Season	Date	Location	Race	Level	Place	Teammates
1	2008–09	23 November 2008	Gällivare, Sweden	4 × 10 km Relay C/F	World Cup	2nd	Olsson / Rickardsson / Hellner
