= Cross-country skiing at the 2013 Winter Universiade =

Cross-country skiing at the 2013 Winter Universiade was held at the Stadio del Fondo di Lago di Tesero in Tesero from December 12 to December 21, 2013.

== Men's events ==
Event	Gold		Silver		Bronze	
10 km freestyle	Milanko Petrović; Serbia	23:57.4	Michail Semenov; Belarus	24:02.9	Raul Shakirzianov; Russia	24:11.1
7.5 km classic + 7.5 km freestyle skiathlon	Raul Shakirzianov; Russia	38:42.1	Mark Starostin; Kazakhstan	38:42.7	Pavel Siulatov; Russia	38:42.7
30 km classic mass start	Vladislav Skobelev; Russia	1:23:14.2	Ermil Vokuev; Russia	1:23:16.6	Andrey Feller; Russia	1:23:18.8
Sprint classic	Maxim Kovalev; Russia	3:25.71	Pavel Siulatov; Russia	3:26.35	Heikki Sakari Korpela; Finland	3:27.43
4 x 10 km relay	Kazakhstan (KAZ); Alexandr Malyshev; Sergey Malyshev; Gennadiy Matviyenko; Mark Starostin	1:43:03.6	Russia (RUS); Pavel Siulatov; Vladislav Skobelev; Ermil Vokuev; Raul Shakirzianov	1:43:04.7	Finland (FIN); Heikki Korpela; Perttu Hyvarinen; Jari Huhta; Juha-Matti Mikkolainen	1:43:30.7

== Women's events ==
Event	Gold		Silver		Bronze	
5 km freestyle	Kateryna Grygorenko; Ukraine; Astrid Øyre Slind; Norway	13:27.1	Not awarded		Maryna Antsybor; Ukraine	13:27.3
5 km classic + 5 km freestyle skiathlon	Tatyana Ossipova; Kazakhstan	29:34.7	Kateryna Grygorenko; Ukraine	29:35.7	Marjaana Pitkänen; Finland	29:36.1
15 km classic mass start	Oxana Usatova; Russia	42:50.4	Marte Monrad-Hansen; Norway	42:54.0	Astrid Øyre Slind; Norway	42:55.0
Sprint classic	Oxana Usatova; Russia	3:24.27	Olga Tsareva; Russia	3:24.28	Olga Repnitsyna; Russia	3:26.64
3 x 5 km relay	Ukraine (UKR); Kateryna Grygorenko; Maryna Antsybor; Kateryna Serdyuk	42:15.8	Sweden (SWE); Lisa Dahl; Sofie Elebro; Julia Jansson	42:18.9	Kazakhstan (KAZ); Tatyana Ossipova; Olga Mandrika; Marina Matrossova	42:18.9

== Mixed events ==
Event	Gold		Silver		Bronze	
Team sprint freestyle	Russia (RUS); Ermil Vokuev; Evgeniia Oschepkova	17:55.40	Sweden (SWE); Anton Arne Karlsson; Emilie Fanny Cedervaern	17:56.58	Russia (RUS); Raul Shakirzianov; Anna Pavaliaeva	17:58.08

== Medal table ==
Rank	Nation	Gold	Silver	Bronze	Total
1	Russia	6	4	5	15
2	Kazakhstan	2	1	1	4
2	Ukraine	2	1	1	4
4	Norway	1	1	1	3
5	Serbia	1	0	0	1
6	Sweden	0	2	0	2
7	Belarus	0	1	0	1
8	Finland	0	0	3	3
Totals (8 entries)		12	10	11	33
