= Oleksiy Krasovsky =

Ukrainian cross-country skier

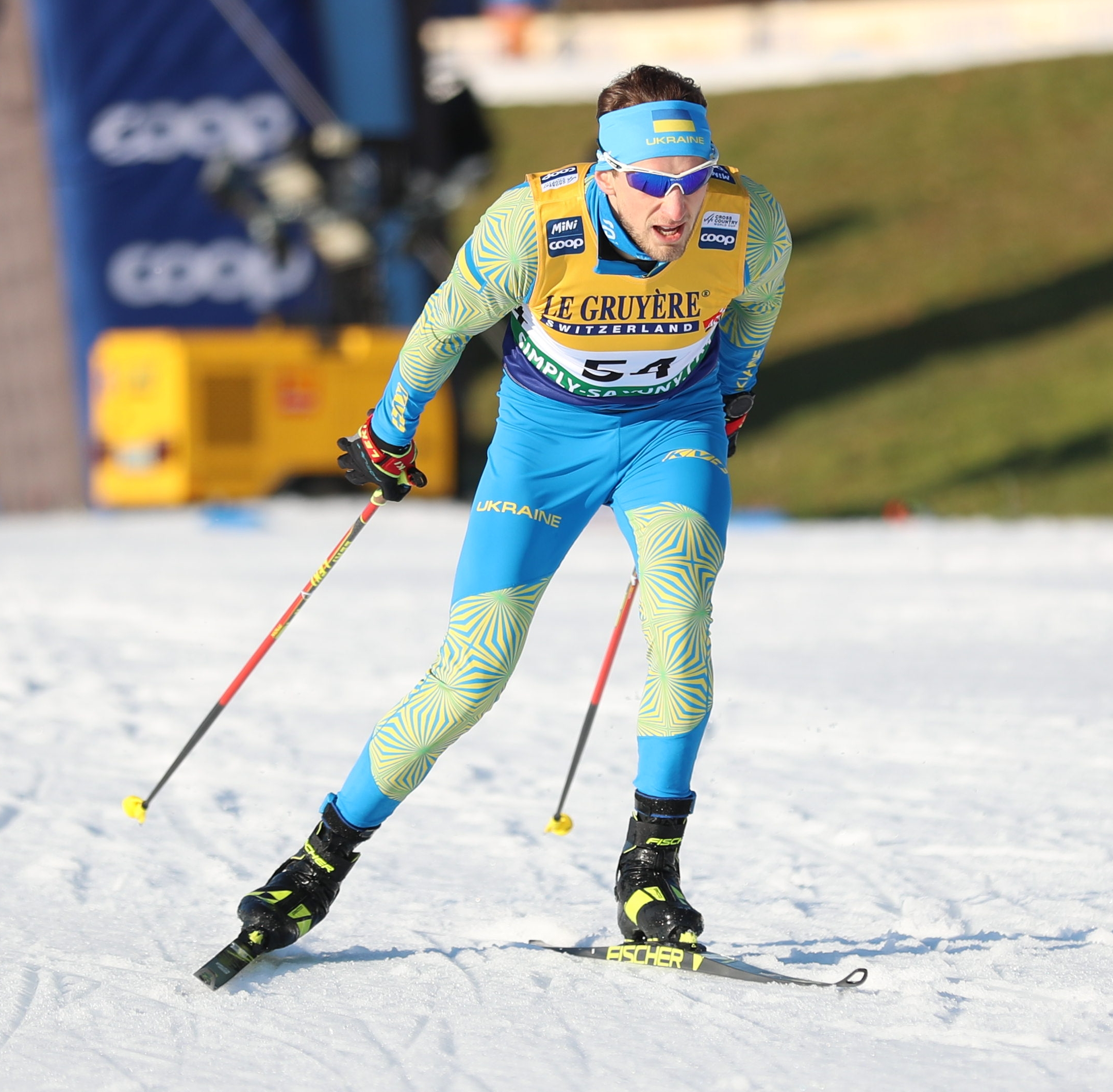
- Krasovsky in 2020

Personal information
- Full name: Oleksiy Ruslanovych Krasovsky
- Born: 30 March 1994 (age 32) Rokytne, Rivne Oblast, Ukraine

Sport
- Sport: Skiing

World Cup career
- Seasons: 8 – (2015–2022)
- Indiv. starts: 41
- Indiv. podiums: 0
- Team starts: 3
- Team podiums: 0
- Overall titles: 0
- Discipline titles: 0
- Updated on 18 March 2023

Oleksiy Ruslanovych Krasovsky (Ukrainian: Олексій Русланович Красовський; born 30 March 1994 in Rokytne, Rivne Oblast, Ukraine) is a cross-country skier from Ukraine. He represented Ukraine at the 2014 and 2018 Winter Olympics.

== Career ==
Krasovsky took up skiing in Shostka, where his parents worked in a youth sport school after moving there when he was very young. His parents were his first trainers. Viktor Shamrai and Valerii Liesnikov also trained him.

Krasovsky started his career at major competitions in February 2012 when he competed at the 2012 Winter Youth Olympics in Innsbruck. He was 14th in mixed relay, 20th in 10km classical race, and 25th in sprint competition.

At World Cup, Krasovsky debuted on 29 November 2014 in Ruka, Finland, where he was 80th in sprint competition. As of January 2022, his best World Cup achievement was 58th rank in sprint freestyle in Dresden on 19 December 2020. His best team performance (together with Dmytro Drahun) was 22nd in team sprint on 20 December 2020 in Dresden.

Olympic debut occurred at the 2014 Winter Games in Russian Sochi. There he was 69th in 15km classical race and 81st in sprint competitions.

At his second Winter Olympics in 2018, Krasovsky participated in almost all competitions except the men's relay. He improved his performance a little compared to the previous Games, achieving 50th rank in the 50 km classical style mass start.

In 2022, Krasovsky was nominated for his third Winter Games in Beijing.

Krasovsky participated at four World Championships: in 2013, 2015, 2017, and 2019. His best personal performance was 49th in skiathlon in 2015. He also took part in three Universiades (2013, 2015, 2017), with his best personal result being 6th in 30 km classical mass start in 2017.

== Cross-country skiing results ==
All results are sourced from the International Ski Federation (FIS).

=== Olympic Games ===
Year	Age	15 km individual	30 km skiathlon	50 km mass start	Sprint	4 × 10 km relay	Team sprint
2014	19	69	—	—	81	—	20
2018	23	84	61	50	71	—	20
2022	27	77	—	—^{[a]}	64	—	17

^{a} Distance reduced to 30 km due to weather conditions.

=== World Championships ===
Year	Age	15 km individual	30 km skiathlon	50 km mass start	Sprint	4 × 10 km relay	Team sprint
2013	18	—	DNF	—	80	17	—
2015	20	—	49	DNF	62	17	—
2017	22	58	50	—	68	16	16
2019	24	55	61	—	70	14	19

=== World Cup ===
==== Season standings ====
Season	Age	Discipline standings				Ski Tour standings				
Season	Age	Overall	Distance	Sprint	U23	Nordic Opening	Tour de Ski	Ski Tour 2020	World Cup Final	Ski Tour Canada
2015	20	NC	NC	NC	NC	—	—	—N/a	—N/a	—N/a
2016	21	NC	NC	NC	NC	DNF	—	—N/a	—N/a	—
2017	22	NC	NC	NC	NC	—	—	—N/a	—	—N/a
2018	23	NC	NC	NC	—N/a	80	—	—N/a	—	—N/a
2019	24	NC	NC	NC	—N/a	—	DNF	—N/a	—	—N/a
2020	25	NC	NC	NC	—N/a	DNF	—	—	—N/a	—N/a
2021	26	NC	NC	NC	—N/a	DNF	—	—N/a	—N/a	—N/a
2022	27	NC	NC	NC	—N/a	—N/a	—	—N/a	—N/a	—N/a

== Personal life ==
He now lives and trains in Shostka, Sumy Oblast. He studied energy management at the Sumy State University.
