= Figure skating at the 2013 Winter Universiade – Ladies' singles =

Figure skating at the 2013 Winter Universiade included a ladies' event for senior level skaters. The short program was held on December 14 and the free skating on December 15, 2013.

== Results ==
Rank	Name	Nation	Total points	SP		FS	
1	Sofia Biryukova	Russia	161.91	1	58.37	2	103.54
2	Valentina Marchei	Italy	160.18	3	53.61	1	106.57
3	Sofia Mishina	Russia	154.89	5	51.67	3	103.22
4	Jelena Glebova	Estonia	152.92	4	51.98	4	100.94
5	Saya Ueno	Japan	146.21	2	55.79	6	90.42
6	Mari Suzuki	Japan	136.47	7	49.13	7	87.34
7	Maria Artemieva	Russia	133.08	6	50.00	10	83.08
8	Roberta Rodeghiero	Italy	132.68	10	42.15	5	90.53
9	Anna Khnychenkova	Ukraine	128.72	11	41.38	8	87.34
10	Francesca Rio	Italy	128.32	9	43.40	9	84.92
11	Daša Grm	Slovenia	124.21	8	44.00	11	80.21
12	Candice Didier	France	120.84	12	40.83	12	80.01
13	Nicole Graf	Switzerland	116.91	13	39.52	13	77.39
14	Alexandra Kunová	Slovakia	108.63	18	34.05	14	74.58
15	Sonia Lafuente	Spain	104.30	17	34.97	15	69.33
16	Jiao Yunya	China	102.24	14	39.45	17	62.79
17	Crystal Kiang	Chinese Taipei	99.07	19	33.20	16	65.87
18	Nika Ceric	Slovenia	98.15	15	36.38	20	61.77
19	Anastasia Yalovaia	Ukraine	96.62	16	35.88	21	60.74
20	Birce Atabey	Turkey	92.24	20	30.43	19	61.81
21	Pina Umek	Slovenia	91.38	21	29.31	18	62.07
22	Mary Ro Reyes	Mexico	86.23	22	28.84	22	57.39
23	Mirna Libric	Croatia	81.49	23	27.82	23	53.67
24	Priscila Alavez	Mexico	71.87	24	27.38	24	44.49
Did not advance to free skating
25	Kim Falconer	South Africa		25	23.85		
26	Christina Grill	Austria		26	21.46		

== Panel of Judges ==
Function	Name	Nation
Referee	Franco Benini	ISU
Technical Controller	Leena Laaksonen	ISU
Technical Specialist	Makoto Okazaki	ISU
Assistant Technical Specialist	Christel Borghi	ISU
Judge	Igor Dolgushin	Russia
Judge	Neil Garrard	South Africa
Judge	Ayumi Kozuka	Japan
Judge	Marta Olozagarre	Spain
Judge	Vladislav Petukhov	Ukraine
Judge	Zanna Kulik	Estonia
Judge	Karol Pescosta	Italy
Data Operator	Maria Baekgaard Kjaer	ISU
Replay Operator	Flavia Graglia	ISU
