= Figure skating at the 2013 Winter Universiade – Ice dance =

Figure skating at the 2013 Winter Universiade included an ice dancing event for senior level skaters. The short dance was held on December 13 and the free dance on December 14, 2013.

== Results ==
Rank	Name	Nation	Total points	SD		FD	
1	Pernelle Carron / Lloyd Jones	France	153.65	1	60.35	1	93.30
2	Julia Zlobina / Alexei Sitnikov	Azerbaijan	142.66	3	56.80	4	85.86
3	Victoria Sinitsina / Ruslan Zhiganshin	Russia	142.50	2	57.05	5	85.45
4	Federica Testa / Lukáš Csölley	Slovakia	141.61	5	52.54	2	89.07
5	Alexandra Stepanova / Ivan Bukin	Russia	139.28	6	51.04	3	88.24
6	Ksenia Monko / Kirill Khaliavin	Russia	135.39	4	53.64	7	81.75
7	Lorenza Alessandrini / Simone Vaturi	Italy	128.22	9	45.99	6	82.23
8	Sara Hurtado / Adrià Díaz	Spain	124.65	7	50.32	9	74.33
9	Siobhan Heekin-Canedy / Dmitri Dun	Ukraine	118.71	10	44.34	8	74.37
10	Dóra Turóczi / Balázs Major	Hungary	115.49	11	44.22	10	71.27
11	Federica Bernardi / Christopher Mior	Italy	109.90	8	46.92	12	62.98
12	Nadezhda Frolenkova / Vitali Nikiforov	Ukraine	105.65	12	41.21	11	64.44
13	Wang Shiyue / Liu Xinyu	China	102.88	13	40.71	13	62.17
14	Zhang Yiyi / Wu Nan	China	101.68	14	39.92	15	61.76
15	Zhao Yue / Liu Chang	China	99.12	15	37.04	14	62.08
16	Celia Robledo / Luis Fenero	Spain	89.83	16	34.81	16	55.02

== Panel of Judges ==
Function	Name	Nation
Referee	Walter Zuccaro	ISU
Technical Controller	Janet Coton	ISU
Technical Specialist	Michael Webster	ISU
Assistant Technical Specialist	Tomas Kika	ISU
Judge	Csaba Balint	Hungary
Judge	Marta Olozagarre	Spain
Judge	Chen Weiguang	China
Judge	Irina Medvedeva	Ukraine
Judge	Alexei Soutchkov	Russia
Judge	Allan Böhm	Slovakia
Judge	Michela Cesaro	Italy
Data Operator	Flavia Graglia	ISU
Replay Operator	Maria Baekgaard Kjaer	ISU
