= Daniel Rickardsson =

Swedish cross-country skier

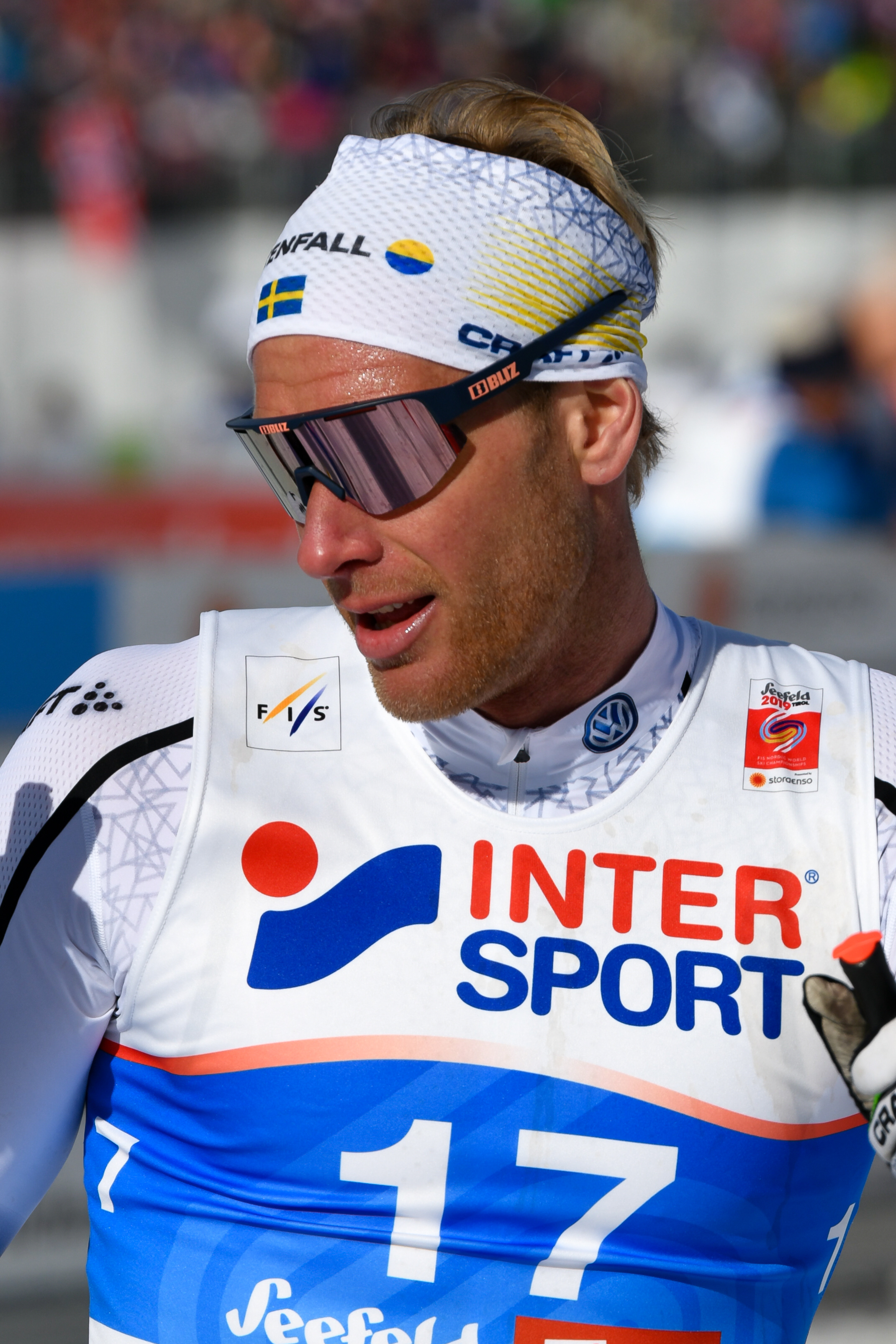
- Rickardsson in March 2019

Personal information
- Full name: Jan Olof Daniel Rickardsson
- Nationality: Sweden
- Born: 15 March 1982 (age 44) Iggesund, Sweden
- Height: 1.92 m (6 ft 4 in)

Sport
- Sport: Skiing
- Club: Hudiksvalls IF

World Cup career
- Seasons: 18 – (2004–2021)
- Indiv. starts: 212
- Indiv. podiums: 10
- Indiv. wins: 3
- Team starts: 22
- Team podiums: 8
- Team wins: 1
- Overall titles: 0 – (3rd in 2011)
- Discipline titles: 0
Medal record
Men's cross-country skiing
Representing Sweden
Event	1st	2nd	3rd
Olympic Games	2	0	1
World Championships	0	3	1
Total	2	3	2
Olympic Games
Gold medal – first place	2010 Vancouver	4 × 10 km relay
Gold medal – first place	2014 Sochi	4 × 10 km relay
Bronze medal – third place	2014 Sochi	15 km classical
World Championships
Silver medal – second place	2011 Oslo	4 × 10 km relay
Silver medal – second place	2013 Val di Fiemme	4 × 10 km relay
Silver medal – second place	2015 Falun	4 × 10 km relay
Bronze medal – third place	2017 Lahti	4 × 10 km relay
- Updated on 15 December 2021

Jan Olof Daniel Rickardsson (born 15 March 1982) is a Swedish retired cross-country skier who started competing in 2002.

== Athletic career ==
His best World Cup finish in 2008 was second in two in 4 × 10 km relay events.

Rickardsson also competed at the FIS Nordic World Ski Championships 2009 in Liberec, finishing sixth in the 4 ×10 km relay, 20th in the 15 km, and 31st in the 50 km events.

In the Vancouver 2010 Winter Olympics, Rickardsson skied the first leg for the gold winning Swedish team in the 4 × 10 km relay event.

In the Oslo 2011 World Championships Rickardsson skied the first leg for the Swedish silver winning team.

On 14 July 2013, Rickardsson and a friend were involved in a traffic accident, after their car had had a punctured tyre. As they stood by the car at the side of the road, they were hit by a recreational vehicle, the driver of which apparently failed to observe them in time. Rickardsson suffered ligament injuries and bruises, but his friend was killed.

At the 2014 Winter Olympics Rickardsson won bronze at the 15 km classical and helped Sweden win gold in the 4 × 10 km relay.

== Cross-country skiing results ==
All results are sourced from the International Ski Federation (FIS).

=== Olympic Games ===
- 3 medals – (2 gold, 1 bronze)

Year	Age	15 km individual	30 km skiathlon	50 km mass start	Sprint	4 × 10 km relay	Team sprint
2010	27	22	23	7	—	Gold	—
2014	31	Bronze	7	8	—	Gold	—
2018	35	11	14	7	—	5	—

=== World Championships ===
- 4 medals – (3 silver, 1 bronze)

Year	Age	15 km individual	30 km skiathlon	50 km mass start	Sprint	4 × 10 km relay	Team sprint
2009	26	20	—	30	—	6	—
2011	28	42	27	7	—	Silver	—
2013	30	10	18	10	—	Silver	—
2015	32	13	—	9	—	Silver	—
2017	34	13	23	—	—	Bronze	—
2019	36	21	15	15	—	—	—

=== World Cup ===
==== Season standings ====
Season	Age	Discipline standings			Ski Tour standings				
Season	Age	Overall	Distance	Sprint	Nordic Opening	Tour de Ski	Ski Tour 2020	World Cup Final	Ski Tour Canada
2004	22	NC	NC	—	—N/a	—N/a	—N/a	—N/a	—N/a
2005	23	NC	NC	—	—N/a	—N/a	—N/a	—N/a	—N/a
2006	24	120	82	—	—N/a	—N/a	—N/a	—N/a	—N/a
2007	25	NC	NC	—	—N/a	—	—N/a	—N/a	—N/a
2008	26	112	83	89	—N/a	47	—N/a	—	—N/a
2009	27	50	35	NC	—N/a	23	—N/a	48	—N/a
2010	28	17	18	83	—N/a	8	—N/a	27	—N/a
2011	29	3rd place, bronze medalist(s)	2nd place, silver medalist(s)	23	3rd place, bronze medalist(s)	9	—N/a	6	—N/a
2012	30	38	30	NC	13	DNF	—N/a	22	—N/a
2013	31	24	21	92	47	13	—N/a	11	—N/a
2014	32	8	3rd place, bronze medalist(s)	97	27	19	—N/a	4	—N/a
2015	33	14	16	NC	12	10	—N/a	—N/a	—N/a
2016	34	64	41	NC	18	—	—N/a	—N/a	—
2017	35	33	24	NC	—	24	—N/a	—	—N/a
2018	36	17	16	NC	35	8	—N/a	17	—N/a
2019	37	62	40	NC	—	28	—N/a	29	—N/a
2020	38	49	42	NC	—	—	19	—N/a	—N/a

==== Individual podiums ====
- 3 victories – (2 WC, 1 SWC)
- 10 podiums – (5 WC, 5 SWC)

No.	Season	Date	Location	Race	Level	Place
1	2009–10	7 January 2010	Toblach, Italy	10 km Individual C	Stage World Cup	1st
2	2010–11	20 November 2010	Gällivare, Sweden	15 km Individual F	World Cup	3rd
3	2010–11	27 November 2010	Rukatunturi, Finland	10 km Individual C	Stage World Cup	3rd
4	2010–11	28 November 2010	(Finland) Nordic Opening	Overall Standings	World Cup	3rd
5	2010–11	22 January 2011	Otepää, Estonia	15 km Individual C	World Cup	2nd
6	2010–11	19 February 2011	Drammen, Norway	15 km Individual C	World Cup	1st
7	2010–11	19 March 2011	Falun, Sweden	10 km + 10 km Pursuit C/F	Stage World Cup	3rd
8	2011–12	27 November 2011	Lahti, Finland	15 km Pursuit C	Stage World Cup	3rd
9	2013–14	2 March 2014	Rukatunturi, Finland	15 km Individual F	Stage World Cup	2nd
10	2013–14	8 March 2014	Oslo, Norway	50 km Mass Start C	World Cup	1st

==== Team podiums ====
- 1 victory – (1 RL)
- 8 podiums – (8 RL)

No.	Season	Date	Location	Race	Level	Place	Teammates
1	2008–09	23 November 2008	Gällivare, Sweden	4 × 10 km Relay C/F	World Cup	2nd	Olsson / Andreasson / Hellner
2	2008–09	7 December 2008	La Clusaz, France	4 × 10 km Relay C/F	World Cup	2nd	Olsson / Södergren / Hellner
3	2010–11	21 November 2010	Gällivare, Sweden	4 × 10 km Relay C/F	World Cup	1st	Larsson / Olsson / Hellner
4	2011–12	20 November 2011	Sjusjøen, Norway	4 × 10 km Relay C/F	World Cup	3rd	Hellner / Olsson / Halfvarsson
5	2011–12	12 February 2012	Nové Město, Czech Republic	4 × 10 km Relay C/F	World Cup	2nd	Olsson / Södergren / Hellner
6	2012–13	25 November 2012	Gällivare, Sweden	4 × 7.5 km Relay C/F	World Cup	2nd	Jönsson / Olsson / Hellner
7	2012–13	20 January 2013	La Clusaz, France	4 × 7.5 km Relay C/F	World Cup	2nd	Olsson / Halfvarsson / Hellner
8	2016–17	21 January 2017	Ulricehamn, Sweden	4 × 7.5 km Relay C/F	World Cup	2nd	Olsson / Hellner / Halfvarsson
