= Michal Žák =

Czech meteorologist and television presenter (born 1978)

Michal Žák (born 12 July 1978 in Třebíč) is a Czech meteorologist and television presenter. working for Czech Television since 2005. He works with the Czech Hydrometeorological Institute and is a pedagogue at Charles University, having co-authored a book about climate and weather in 2018.

== Bibliography ==
- Zárybnická, Alena; ŽÁK, Michal; KARAS, Pavel; MÍKOVÁ, Taťána (2018). Když se blýská na časy : počasí a klima u nás i ve světě (1. vydání ed.). Brno: CPress. ISBN 978-80-264-2304-1.m
