= Vitaliy Kilchytskyy =

Ukrainian biathlete (born 1988)

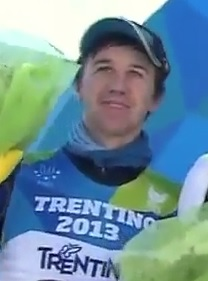

Personal information
- Full name: Vitaliy Kilchytskyy
- Born: 17 June 1988 (age 38) Novoyavorivsk, Ukrainian SSR

Sport
- Sport: Skiing
Medal record
Men's biathlon
Representing Ukraine
European Championships (U21)
Silver medal – second place	2009 Ufa	Relay
Bronze medal – third place	2008 Nové Město	Relay
Bronze medal – third place	2007 Bansko	Relay
Youth World Championships
Bronze medal – third place	2005 Kontiolahti	3 × 7.5 km relay
Universiade
Gold medal – first place	2015 Osrblie	Mass start
Silver medal – second place	2013 Trentino	Sprint
Silver medal – second place	2013 Trentino	Mixed relay

Vitaliy Kilchytskyy (Ukrainian: Віталій Ярославович Кільчицький; born 17 June 1988) is a Ukrainian biathlete. Champion and medalist of the Winter Universiade, bronze medalist of the World Junior Biathlon Championships, two-time medalist of the European Junior Biathlon Championships, participant of the European Biathlon Championships, participant of the World Cup biathlon stages.
