= Vasyl Koval =

Ukrainian cross-country skier (born 1988)

Personal information
- Full name: Vasyl Koval
- Born: 17 January 1988 (age 38) Ukraine

Sport
- Sport: Skiing
- Updated on 21 February 2013

Vasyl Koval (Василь Коваль 17 January 1988) is a cross-country skier from Ukraine.

== Performances ==
Level	Year	Event	SP	IS	PU	MS	TS	R
NJWSC	2006	Kranj, Slovenia	60	42	DNF			
NJWSC	2007	Tarvisio, Italy	DNS		48			
NJWSC	2008	Mals, Italy	57	73	29			20
NWSC	2013	Val di Fiemme, Italy	95					
