= Cesar Baena =

Venezuelan cross-country skier

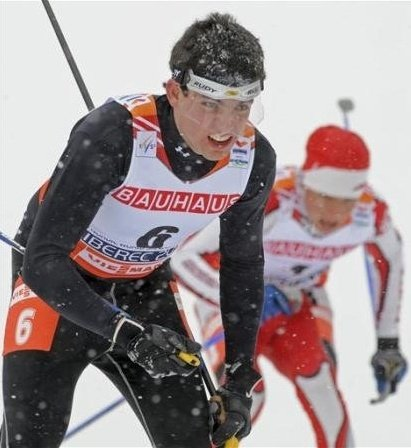
- Baena during the 2009 FIS Nordic World Ski Championships in Liberec, Czech Republic

Personal information
- Full name: Cesar Augusto Baena Sierraalta
- Nationality: Venezuela Spain
- Born: 2 November 1986 (age 40) Caracas-Altamira, Venezuela
- Height: 1.81 m (5 ft 11 in)

Sport
- Sport: Skiing
- Club: Ski Alliance

World Cup career
- Seasons: 2009

Cesar Baena (born 2 November 1986) is a Venezuelan and Spanish cross-country skier and former Guinness World Record holder. Head coach of the venezuelan ski team. He has participated in a total of five FIS Nordic World Ski Championships.

== Skiing career ==
Baena was the first South American skier to compete in a FIS Cross-Country World Cup, a sprint qualification in Düsseldorf in 2009. That year, he competed in his first World Championships.

On 5 July 2012, Baena set the Guinness World Record for the Longest Journey on Roller Skis, a 2246 km journey between Stockholm and Oslo. The record no longer stands.

Baena was the coach of Adrian Solano, a fellow Venezuelan who was dubbed the "world's worst skier" for his performance at the 2017 FIS Nordic World Ski Championships.

In 2017, Baena was detained after punching the landlord of the Embassy of Venezuela in Canberra, Australia. Baena claimed that the landlord had been "very provocative" toward him. He avoided jail time and was placed on a 12-month good behaviour order.
