= Andrew Pohl =

New Zealand cross-country skier (born 1989)

Personal information
- Full name: Andrew Pohl
- Born: 20 March 1989 (age 37)

Sport
- Sport: Skiing

Andrew Pohl (born 20 March 1989) is a New Zealand cross-country skier.

He represented New Zealand at the FIS Nordic World Ski Championships 2015 in Falun.
