= Maryna Antsybor =

Ukrainian cross country skier (born 1987)

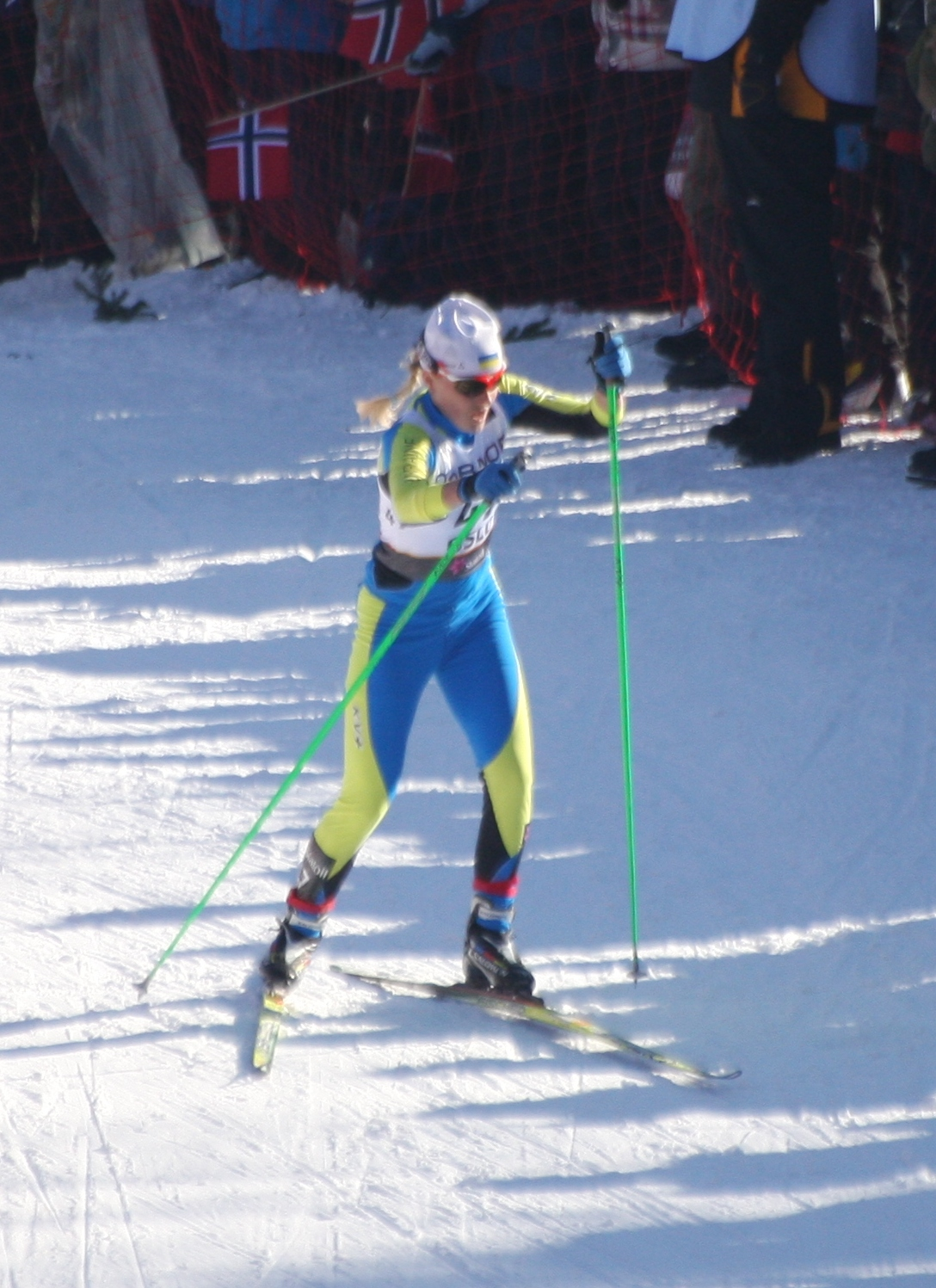
- Antsybor in 2011

Personal information
- Full name: Maryna Mykolayivna Antsybor
- Nationality: Ukraine
- Born: 10 October 1987 (age 39) Konotop, Ukrainian SSR, Soviet Union
- Height: 1.61 m (5 ft 3 in)

Sport
- Sport: Skiing
- Club: Dynamo

World Cup career
- Seasons: 11 – (2008–2009, 2011–2016, 2018, 2021–2022)
- Indiv. starts: 70
- Indiv. podiums: 0
- Team starts: 7
- Team podiums: 0
- Overall titles: 0 – (74th in 2008)
- Discipline titles: 0
Medal record
Representing Ukraine
Women's cross-country skiing
Winter Universiade
Gold medal – first place	2013 Trentino	3 × 5 km relay
Silver medal – second place	2011 Erzurum	3 × 5 km relay
Bronze medal – third place	2013 Trentino	5 km freestyle
- Updated on 8 January 2023

Maryna Mykolayivna Antsybor (Ukrainian: Марина Миколаївна Анцибор, born 10 October 1987, in Konotop, Ukrainian SSR) is a Ukrainian cross country skier who has competed internationally since 2005. She represented Ukraine at the 2010, 2014, and 2018 Winter Olympics. She won a gold and a bronze medal at the 2013 Winter Universiade as well as a silver medal at the 2011 Winter Universiade. . She competed at the 2022 Winter Olympics, in Women's 10 kilometre classical, Women's 30 kilometre freestyle, Women's 15 kilometre skiathlon, Women's sprint, and Women's 4 × 5 kilometre relay.

== Career ==
Antsybor started her international career in 2005 when she participated at the 2005 European Youth Olympic Winter Festival in Swiss Monthey and finished 4th in 7.5 km freestyle race and 13th in 5 km classical race. She also took part in three FIS Nordic Junior World Ski Championships between 2005 and 2007, with her best personal result being 7th in 10 km pursuit in Italian Tarvisio in 2007.

She debuted at World Cup on December 1, 2007, in Finnish Kuusamo where she finished 61st in classical sprint. That season, she had three Top-30 results and earned her first World Cup points. As of January 2022, Antsybor's best World Cup individual finish was 19th at a 7.6 km event in Liberec, Czech Republic, on December 16, 2008, and best World Cup team finishes were 11th in team relay in Lahti, Finland, on January 24, 2021 (together with Kaminska, Olekh, and Kovalova), and in Gällivare, Sweden, on November 21, 2010 (together with Nesterenko, Hryhorenko, and Shevchenko).

At the 2010 Winter Olympics in Vancouver, she finished 14th in the 4 × 5 km relay (together with Zavalii, Hryhorenko, and Shevchenko), 15th in the team sprint (together with Hryhorenko), and 37th in the 10 km events. Antsybor also competed in the 7.5 km + 7.5 km double pursuit event, but did not finish.

She competed at the 2014 Winter Olympics in Sochi where she was 47th in skiathlon, 35th in mass start, 12th in relay (together with Antypenko, Hryhorenko, and Shevchenko) and 34th in sprint.

Antsybor was nominated for Ukrainian national team at the 2018 Winter Olympics in Pyeongchang. She was 46th in 10 km individual race, 53rd in skiathlon, 56th in sprint, and 19th in team sprint (together with Antypenko).

In 2022, Maryna Antsybor was nominated for her fourth Winter Games in Beijing.

She participated in six FIS Nordic World Ski Championships. Her best finish was 10th in the 4 × 5 km relay in 2013 (together with Antypenko, Hryhorenko, and Shevchenko) while her best individual finish was 30th in the 30 km event in 2009. She also took part in four Universiades (2007, 2011, 2013, 2015) and won three medals.

== Cross-country skiing results ==
All results are sourced from the International Ski Federation (FIS).

=== Olympic Games ===
Year	Age	10 km individual	15 km skiathlon	30 km mass start	Sprint	4 × 5 km relay	Team sprint
2010	22	37	DNF	—	—	13	14
2014	26	—	47	33	33	11	—
2018	30	46	53	—	56	—	19
2022	34	58	56	37	54	18	18

=== World Championships ===
Year	Age	10 km individual	15 km skiathlon	30 km mass start	Sprint	4 × 5 km relay	Team sprint
2007	19	35	—	—	53	12	16
2009	21	42	—	30	47	11	—
2011	23	—	50	40	57	12	—
2013	25	49	47	—	—	10	19
2015	27	40	—	—	48	11	14
2021	33	49	54	41	64	13	18

=== World Cup ===
==== Season standings ====
Season	Age	Discipline standings			Ski Tour standings			
Season	Age	Overall	Distance	Sprint	Nordic Opening	Tour de Ski	World Cup Final	Ski Tour Canada
2008	20	74	49	NC	—N/a	—	—	—N/a
2009	21	NC	NC	NC	—N/a	—	—	—N/a
2011	23	NC	NC	NC	61	—	—	—N/a
2012	24	108	78	NC	65	44	—	—N/a
2013	25	99	70	NC	57	35	—	—N/a
2014	26	NC	NC	NC	60	—	—	—N/a
2015	27	NC	NC	NC	—	—	—N/a	—N/a
2016	28	NC	NC	NC	73	—	—N/a	—
2018	30	NC	NC	NC	—	—	—	—N/a
2021	33	111	81	NC	60	—	—N/a	—N/a
2022	34	NC	NC	NC	—N/a	—	—N/a	—N/a

== Personal life ==
On February 16, 2017, she gave birth to a son.
