= Brynjar Kristinsson =

Icelandic cross country skier (born 1988)

Personal information
- Full name: Brynjar Leo Kristinsson
- Born: 21 January 1988 (age 38)

Sport
- Sport: Skiing
- Club: Akureyri

World Cup career
- Seasons: -
Medal record
Men's cross-country skiing
Representing Iceland

Brynjar Kristinsson (born 21 January 1988) is an Icelandic cross-country skier.

He represented Iceland at the FIS Nordic World Ski Championships 2015 in Falun.
