= Yerdos Akhmadiyev =

Kazakh cross-country skier (born 1985)

Personal information
- Native name: Ердос Жаксимбинович Ахмадиев
- Full name: Yerdos Akhmadiyev
- Born: 6 March 1985 (age 41) Urzhar, Kazakhstan

Sport
- Country: Kazakhstan
- Sport: Cross-country skiing

Yerdos Akhmadiyev (Ердос Жаксимбинович Ахмадиев, born 6 March 1985) is a Kazakh cross-country skier who has competed since 2010. Akhmadiyev was selected to carry the Kazakh flag during the opening ceremony of the 2014 Winter Olympics in Sochi, Russia.

Akhmadiyev is also scheduled to carry the Kazakh flag during the opening ceremony of the 2017 Asian Winter Games.

== See also ==
- Kazakhstan at the 2014 Winter Olympics

Olympic Games
Preceded by Nurmakhan Tinaliyev	Flagbearer for Kazakhstan; Sochi 2014	Succeeded by Ruslan Zhaparov
