= Michail Semenov =

Belarusian cross-country skier (born 1986)

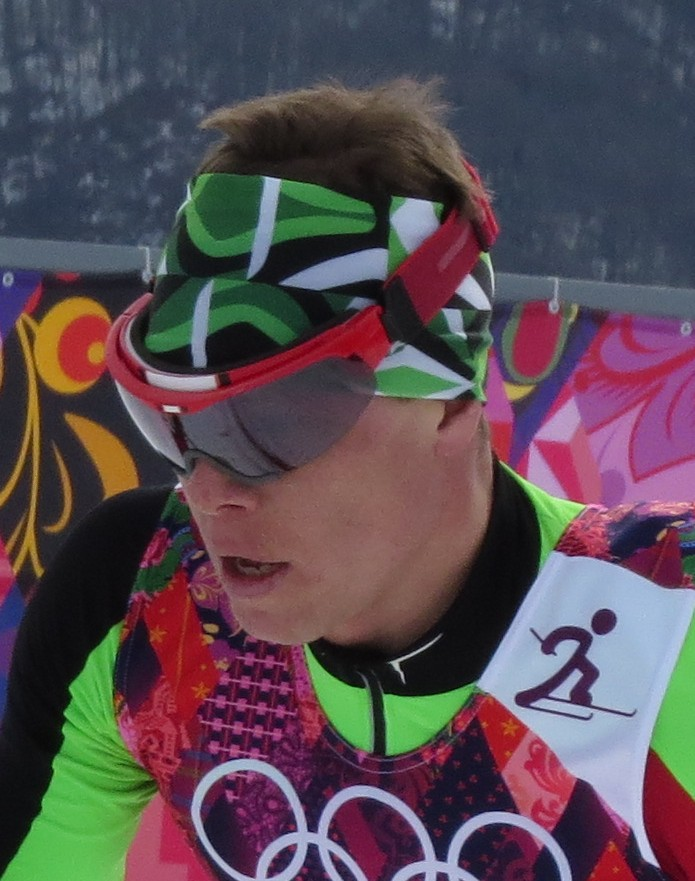
- Semenov in 2014

Personal information
- Born: 6 February 1986 (age 40) Ostrov, Pskov Oblast, Soviet Union
- Height: 1.68 m (5 ft 6 in)
- Weight: 66 kg (146 lb)
Medal record
Men's cross-country skiing
Representing Belarus
Winter Universiade
| Silver medal – second place | 2013 Trentino | 10 km freestyle |

Michail Alekseyevich Semenov (Russian: Михаил Алексеевич Семёнов, Mikhail Aliaksevich Siamionau, born 6 February 1986) is a cross-country skier from Belarus. He competed for Belarus at the 2014 Winter Olympics in the cross-country skiing events.
