= Aivar Rehemaa =

Estonian cross-country skier (born 1982)

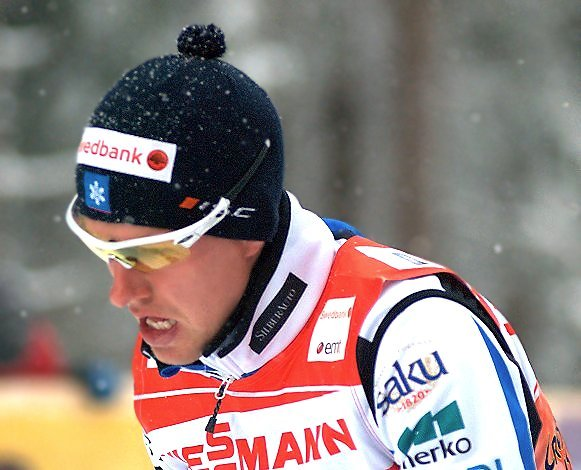
Aivar Rehemaa in 2010.

Aivar Rehemaa (born 28 September 1982) is an Estonian cross-country skier. He competed at the 2006 Winter Olympics in Turin. He represented Estonia at the 2010 Winter Olympics in Vancouver. His best finish at the Winter Olympics is 8th in the 4×10 km relay in 2006.

Rehemaa's best finish at the FIS Nordic World Ski Championships was eighth on three occasions (Team Sprint: 2009, 4×10 km relay: 2003, 2009). His best World Cup finish was eighth at a 15 km event in Italy in 2009.

He is a junior world champion of 2002 Schonach's 30 km classical mass-start.
