= Myroslav Bilosyuk =

Ukrainian cross-country skier (born 1985)

Personal information
- Full name: Myroslav Bilosyuk
- Born: 29 July 1985 (age 40) Ukrainian SSR, Soviet Union

Sport
- Sport: Skiing
- Updated on 23 February 2013

Myroslav Bilosyuk (Ukrainian: Мирослав Билосюк; born 29 July 1985) is a cross-country skier from Ukraine.

== Performances ==
Level	Year	Event	SP	IS	PU	MS	TS	R
NJWSC	2005	Rovaniemi, Finland	52	56	66			
NWSC	2011	Oslo, Norway	66	61	66			
NWSC	2013	Val di Fiemme, Italy		60	54		19	17
