= Oleksiy Shvidkiy =

Ukrainian cross-country skier (born 1986)

Personal information
- Full name: Oleksiy Shvidkiy
- Born: 10 March 1986 (age 40) Ukraine

Sport
- Sport: Skiing
- Updated on 21 February 2013

Oleksiy Shvidkiy (born 10 March 1986) is a cross-country skier from Ukraine.

== Performances ==
Level	Year	Event	SP	IS	PU	MS	TS	R
NJWSC	2005	Rovaniemi, Finland		69	63			
NWSC	2011	Oslo, Norway		60		61	23	
NWSC	2013	Val di Fiemme, Italy	56	77	63			
