= Vitaliy Shtun =

Ukrainian cross-country skier (born 1986)

Personal information
- Full name: Vitaliy Shtun
- Born: 10 October 1986 (age 39) Ukrainian SSR, Soviet Union

Sport
- Sport: Skiing
- Updated on 23 February 2013

Vitaliy Shtun (Ukrainian: Віталій Штун; born 10 October 1986) is a cross-country skier from Ukraine.

== Performances ==
| Level | Year | Event | SP | IS | PU | MS | TS | R |
|---|---|---|---|---|---|---|---|---|
| NJWSC | 2005 | Rovaniemi, Finland | 58 | 42 | 38 | | | |
| NJWSC | 2006 | Kranj, Slovenia | 52 | 38 | 36 | | | |
| NWSC | 2007 | Sapporo, Japan | 53 | 82 | | | | 15 |
| NWSC | 2009 | Liberec, Czech Republic | 51 | 55 | DNF | 52 | 18 | |
| NWSC | 2013 | Val di Fiemme, Italy | | 49 | 49 | | | 17 |
