= United States at the 1998 Winter Olympics =

- Flag of the United States
- IOC code: USA
- NOC: United States Olympic Committee

in Nagano
- Competitors: 186 (105 men, 81 women) in 8 sports
- Flag bearers: Eric Flaim (Opening) (short track speed skating); Cammi Granato (Closing) (ice hockey)
- Medals Ranked 5th: Gold 6 Silver 3 Bronze 4 Total 13

Winter Olympics appearances (overview)
- 1924; 1928; 1932; 1936; 1948; 1952; 1956; 1960; 1964; 1968; 1972; 1976; 1980; 1984; 1988; 1992; 1994; 1998; 2002; 2006; 2010; 2014; 2018; 2022; 2026

The United States competed at the 1998 Winter Olympics in Nagano, Japan.

With Salt Lake City hosting the 2002 Winter Olympics, a cultural segment of the city and the state of Utah was shown during the closing ceremony.

== Medalists ==
The following U.S. competitors won medals at the games. In the discipline-specific sections below, medalists' names are bolded.

Medal	Name	Sport	Event	Date
Gold	Picabo Street	Alpine skiing	Women's super-G	February 11
Gold	Jonny Moseley	Freestyle skiing	Men's moguls	February 11
Gold	United States women's national ice hockey team: Chris Bailey; Laurie Baker; Alana Blahoski; Lisa Brown-Miller; Karyn Bye; Colleen Coyne; Sara Decosta; Tricia Dunn-Luoma; Cammi Granato; Katie King; Shelley Looney; Sue Merz; Allison Mleczko; Tara Mounsey; Vicki Movsessian; Jenny Potter; Angela Ruggiero; Sarah Tueting; Gretchen Ulion; Sandra Whyte	Ice hockey	Women's tournament	February 17
Gold	Eric Bergoust	Freestyle skiing	Men's aerials	February 18
Gold	Nikki Stone	Freestyle skiing	Women's aerials	February 18
Gold	Tara Lipinski	Figure skating	Women's singles	February 20
Silver	Gordon Sheer; Chris Thorpe	Luge	Doubles	February 13
Silver	Chris Witty	Speed skating	Women's 1000 meters	February 19
Silver	Michelle Kwan	Figure skating	Women's singles	February 20
Bronze	Ross Powers	Snowboarding	Men's halfpipe	February 12
Bronze	Shannon Dunn-Downing	Snowboarding	Women's halfpipe	February 12
Bronze	Mark Grimmette; Brian Martin	Luge	Doubles	February 13
Bronze	Chris Witty	Speed skating	Women's 1500 meters	February 16

Medals by sport
Sport	1st place, gold medalist(s)	2nd place, silver medalist(s)	3rd place, bronze medalist(s)	Total
Freestyle skiing	3	0	0	**3**
Figure skating	1	1	0	**2**
Alpine skiing	1	0	0	**1**
Ice hockey	1	0	0	**1**
Luge	0	1	1	**2**
Speed skating	0	1	1	**2**
Snowboarding	0	0	2	**2**
Total	6	3	4	13

Medals by gender
Gender	1st place, gold medalist(s)	2nd place, silver medalist(s)	3rd place, bronze medalist(s)	Total	Percentage
Female	4	2	2	**8**	61.5%
Male	2	1	2	**5**	38.5%
Total	6	3	4	13	100%

Multiple medalists
Name	Sport	1st place, gold medalist(s)	2nd place, silver medalist(s)	3rd place, bronze medalist(s)	Total
Chris Witty	Speed skating	0	1	1	**2**

== Competitors ==
The following is the list of number of competitors in the Games.

Sport	Men	Women	Total
Alpine skiing	12	10	22
Biathlon	4	5	9
Bobsleigh	8	–	8
Cross-country skiing	5	5	10
Curling	5	5	10
Figure skating	6	7	13
Freestyle skiing	8	6	14
Ice hockey	22	20	42
Luge	7	3	10
Nordic combined	4	–	4
Short track speed skating	6	5	11
Ski jumping	5	–	5
Snowboarding	6	8	14
Speed skating	7	7	14
Total	105	81	186

== Alpine skiing ==
Men

Athlete	Event	Run 1		Run 2		Run 3		Total	
Athlete	Event	Time	Rank	Time	Rank	Time	Rank	Time	Rank
A. J. Kitt	Downhill	—N/a						DNF	
Tommy Moe	Downhill	—N/a						1:51.43	12
Kyle Rasmussen	Downhill	—N/a						1:51.09	9
Jason Rosener	Downhill	—N/a						1:52.33	15
Chad Fleischer	Combined	DNF							
Matt Grosjean	Combined	48.32	3	DNF					
Jason Rosener	Combined	DNF							
Chad Fleischer	Super-G	—N/a						1:40.19	34
Kyle Rasmussen	Super-G	—N/a						1:36.52	13
Tommy Moe	Super-G	—N/a						1:35.97	8
Daron Rahlves	Super-G	—N/a						1:35.96	7
Sacha Gros	Giant slalom	1:24.57	29	1:22.32	29	—N/a		2:46.89	26
Bode Miller	Giant slalom	1:56.98	46	DSQ		—N/a		DSQ	
Casey Puckett	Giant slalom	DNF				—N/a		DNF	
Daron Rahlves	Giant slalom	1:22.81	21	1:20.78	22	—N/a		2:43.59	20
Matt Grosjean	Slalom	56.58	11	55.98	16	—N/a		1:52.56	15
Chip Knight	Slalom	DNF				—N/a		DNF	
Andy LeRoy	Slalom	DNF				—N/a		DNF	
Bode Miller	Slalom	57.52	22	DNF		—N/a		DNF	

Women

Athlete	Event	Run 1		Run 2		Run 3		Total	
Athlete	Event	Time	Rank	Time	Rank	Time	Rank	Time	Rank
Kirsten Clark	Downhill	—N/a						1:32.25	28
Jonna Mendes	Downhill	—N/a						1:30.89	17
Kathleen Monahan	Downhill	—N/a						1:32.22	26
Picabo Street	Downhill	—N/a						1:29.54	6
Kirsten Clark	Combined	1:31.47	17	41.75	21	39.03	19	2:52.25	18
Caroline Lalive	Combined	1:31.05	14	37.29	7	36.42	10	2:44.76	7
Jonna Mendes	Combined	1:31.16	15	39.92	18	37.51	15	2:48.59	14
Alex Shaffer	Combined	1:32.53	19	37.33	9	35.38	6	2:45.24	9
Kirsten Clark	Super-G	—N/a						DNF	
Jonna Mendes	Super-G	—N/a						1:20.35	32
Kathleen Monahan	Super-G	—N/a						1:20.25	29
Picabo Street	Super-G	—N/a						1:18.02	1st place, gold medalist(s)
Caroline Lalive	Giant slalom	DNF				—N/a		DNF	
Julie Parisien	Giant slalom	1:25.34	30	1:37.44	27	—N/a		3:02.78	28
Sarah Schleper	Giant slalom	1:23.63	26	DNF		—N/a		DNF	
Alex Shaffer	Giant slalom	1:25.02	29	DNF		—N/a		DNF	
Kristina Koznick	Slalom	46.73	9	DNF		—N/a		DNF	
Tasha Nelson	Slalom	DSQ				—N/a		DSQ	
Julie Parisien	Slalom	47.91	22	48.44	13	—N/a		1:36.35	13
Sarah Schleper	Slalom	49.17	31	50.25	22	—N/a		1:39.42	22

== Biathlon ==
Men

Athlete	Event	Time	Misses	Rank
Jay Hakkinen	Sprint	31:31.6	3 (1+2)	60
Dan Westover	Sprint	30:39.5	1 (1+0)	49
Jay Hakkinen	Individual	1:02:10.3	4 (1+1+0+2)	42
Robert Rosser	Individual	1:08:35.7	7 (1+4+1+1)	69
Andrew Erickson; Jay Hakkinen; Robert Rosser; Dan Westover	Relay	1:28:13.9	0 (0+0)	17

Women

Athlete	Event	Time	Misses	Rank
Deborah Nordyke	Sprint	25:50.5	2	48
Kristina Sabasteanski	Sprint	25:12.2	1	33
Stacey Wooley	Sprint	27:03.0	3	58
Kara Salmela	Individual	1:04:43.7	5	56
Ntala Skinner	Individual	1:09:09.0	3	61
Stacey Wooley	Individual	1:03:57.3	2	55
Kristina Sabasteanski; Kara Salmela; Ntala Skinner; Stacey Wooley	Relay	1:48:30.2	1 (0+1)	15

== Bobsleigh ==
Athletes	Event	Run 1		Run 2		Run 3		Run 4		Total	
Athletes	Event	Time	Rank	Time	Rank	Time	Rank	Time	Rank	Time	Rank
Jim Herberich; Robert Olesen	Two-man	54.91	10	54.70	9	54.46	8	54.46	5	3:38.53	7
Brian Shimer; Garrett Hines	Two-man	54.88	9	54.79	13	54.42	6	54.66	11	3:38.75	10
Jim Herberich; Darrin Steele; John Kasper; Robert Olesen	Four-man	53.74	15	53.72	14	53.81	8	—N/a		2:41.27	12
Brian Shimer; Chip Minton; Randy Jones; Garrett Hines	Four-man	52.93	4	53.42	4	53.73	4	—N/a		2:40.08	5

== Cross-country skiing ==
Men

Athlete	Event	Time	Rank
John Bauer	10 km classical	29:58.4	41
Marcus Nash	10 km classical	32:11.9	78
Justin Wadsworth	10 km classical	30:26.3	47
Patrick Weaver	10 km classical	30:04.4	43
John Bauer	15 km freestyle pursuit	45:24.6	47
Justin Wadsworth	15 km freestyle pursuit	45:18.0	44
Patrick Weaver	15 km freestyle pursuit	45:07.1	40
John Bauer	30 km classical	1:44:15.3	47
Marcus Nash	30 km classical	1:44:37.7	49
Justin Wadsworth	30 km classical	1:42:21.1	37
Patrick Weaver	30 km classical	DNF	
John Bauer	50 km freestyle	2:24:45.4	53
Marc Gilbertson	50 km freestyle	2:24:37.5	52
Marcus Nash	50 km freestyle	2:17:37.8	35
Patrick Weaver	50 km freestyle	2:20:37.7	44
John Bauer; Marcus Nash; Justin Wadsworth; Patrick Weaver	4×10 km relay	1:48:16.4	17

Women

Athlete	Event	Time	Rank
Nina Kemppel	5 km classical	20:29.7	67
Laura McCabe	5 km classical	21:06.9	75
Karen Petty	5 km classical	19:36.6	51
Laura Wilson	5 km classical	20:24.6	65
Laura McCabe	10 km freestyle pursuit	DNF	
Karen Petty	10 km freestyle pursuit	34:12.2	52
Laura Wilson	10 km freestyle pursuit	34:42.4	57
Nina Kemppel	15 km classical	53:57.2	52
Suzanne King	15 km classical	52:58.9	48
Karen Petty	15 km classical	52:45.3	47
Laura Wilson	15 km classical	54:10.4	53
Suzanne King	30 km freestyle	1:34:01.8	43
Laura McCabe	30 km freestyle	1:35:09.9	49
Karen Petty	30 km freestyle	1:33:47.3	41
Laura Wilson	30 km freestyle	1:33:10.6	36
Suzanne King; Laura McCabe; Karen Petty; Laura Wilson	4×5 km relay	1:00:51.2	15

== Curling ==
Summary

Team	Event	Group stage								Tie-breaker 1	Tie-breaker 2	Semifinal	Final / BM	
Team	Event	Opposition Score	Opposition Score	Opposition Score	Opposition Score	Opposition Score	Opposition Score	Opposition Score	Rank	Opposition Score	Opposition Score	Opposition Score	Opposition Score	Rank
Tim Somerville; Mike Peplinski; Myles Brundidge; John Gordon; Tim Solin	Men's tournament	SWE; L 2–6	CAN; L 3–11	NOR; W 7–6	SUI; L 2–7	GER; W 8–5	JPN; L 6–8	GBR; W 6–3	=4 Q	SWE; W 5–2	JPN; W 5–4	CAN; L 1–7	Bronze medal final NOR; L 4–9	4
Lisa Schoeneberg; Erika Brown; Debbie Henry; Lori Mountford; Stacey Liapis	Women's tournament	CAN; L 6–7	SWE; L 5–8	GER; W 8–5	GBR; L 5–8	DEN; L 5–8	NOR; L 8–9	JPN; W 10–2	7	—N/a		Did not advance		

=== Men's tournament ===
Team

Position	Curler
Skip	Tim Somerville
Third	Mike Peplinski
Second	Myles Brundidge
Lead	John Gordon
Alternate	Tim Solin

Round-robin
Top four teams advanced to semi-finals.

Country	Skip	W	L
Canada	Mike Harris	6	1
Norway	Eigil Ramsfjell	5	2
Switzerland	Patrick Hürlimann	5	2
United States	Tim Somerville	3	4
Japan	Makoto Tsuruga	3	4
Sweden	Peja Lindholm	3	4
Great Britain	Douglas Dryburgh	2	5
Germany	Andy Kapp	1	6

Draw 1
Monday, February 9, 14:00

Sheet D	1	2	3	4	5	6	7	8	9	10	Final
United States (Somerville) 🔨	1	0	0	0	0	0	0	1	0	0	2
Sweden (Lindholm)	0	0	0	0	0	1	0	0	2	3	6

Draw 3
Tuesday, February 10, 19:00

Sheet C	1	2	3	4	5	6	7	8	9	10	Final
United States (Somerville) 🔨	0	1	1	0	0	2	0	2	0	1	7
Norway (Ramsfjell)	0	0	0	1	1	0	3	0	1	0	6

Draw 5
Thursday, February 12, 9:00

Sheet A	1	2	3	4	5	6	7	8	9	10	Final
United States (Somerville) 🔨	2	0	2	0	1	1	0	0	2	X	8
Germany (Kapp)	0	1	0	2	0	0	1	1	0	X	5

Draw 7
Friday, February 13, 14:00

Sheet A	1	2	3	4	5	6	7	8	9	10	Final
Great Britain (Dryburgh) 🔨	1	0	1	0	0	0	1	0	0	X	3
United States (Somerville)	0	2	0	0	0	3	0	0	1	X	6

Draw 2
Tuesday, February 10, 9:00

Sheet B	1	2	3	4	5	6	7	8	9	10	Final
Canada (Harris) 🔨	3	0	2	0	1	5	X	X	X	X	11
United States (Somerville)	0	1	0	2	0	0	X	X	X	X	3

Draw 4
Wednesday, February 11, 14:00

Sheet B	1	2	3	4	5	6	7	8	9	10	Final
United States (Somerville) 🔨	0	0	0	0	0	2	0	0	X	X	2
Switzerland (Hürlimann)	0	0	1	0	2	0	1	3	X	X	7

Draw 6
Thursday, February 12, 19:00

Sheet D	1	2	3	4	5	6	7	8	9	10	Final
Japan (Tsuruga) 🔨	0	1	0	2	0	1	0	4	0	X	8
United States (Somerville)	0	0	1	0	2	0	2	0	1	X	6

Tie-breaker 1
Friday, February 13, 19:00

Sheet B	1	2	3	4	5	6	7	8	9	10	Final
United States (Somerville) 🔨	0	0	0	3	0	0	1	1	0	X	5
Sweden (Lindholm)	0	0	1	0	0	0	0	0	1	X	2

Tie-breaker 2
Saturday, February 14, 9:00

Sheet C	1	2	3	4	5	6	7	8	9	10	Final
United States (Somerville)	0	0	1	0	0	3	0	0	0	1	5
Japan (Tsuruga) 🔨	1	0	0	0	1	0	0	2	0	0	4

Semi-final
Saturday, February 14, 18:00

Sheet D	1	2	3	4	5	6	7	8	9	10	Final
Canada (Harris) 🔨	2	1	1	0	1	2	0	0	X	X	7
United States (Somerville)	0	0	0	0	0	0	0	1	X	X	1

Bronze medal match
Sunday, February 15, 9:00

Sheet B	1	2	3	4	5	6	7	8	9	10	Final
United States (Somerville) 🔨 4th	0	0	0	0	0	3	0	1	0	X	4
Norway (Ramsfjell)	0	1	1	1	3	0	2	0	1	X	9

=== Women's tournament ===
Team

Position	Curler
Skip	Lisa Schoeneberg
Third	Erika Brown
Second	Debbie Henry
Lead	Lori Mountford
Alternate	Stacey Liapis

Round-robin
Top four teams advanced to semi-finals.

Country	Skip	W	L
Canada	Sandra Schmirler	6	1
Sweden	Elisabet Gustafson	6	1
Denmark	Helena Blach Lavrsen	5	2
Great Britain	Kirsty Hay	4	3
Japan	Mayumi Ohkutsu	2	5
Norway	Dordi Nordby	2	5
United States 7th	Lisa Schoeneberg	2	5
Germany	Andrea Schöpp	1	6

Draw 1
Monday, February 8, 9:00

Sheet B	1	2	3	4	5	6	7	8	9	10	Final
Canada (Schmirler)	0	2	0	3	2	0	0	0	0	X	7
United States (Schoeneberg) 🔨	1	0	1	0	0	2	1	1	0	X	6

Draw 3
Tuesday, February 10, 14:00

Sheet A	1	2	3	4	5	6	7	8	9	10	Final
Germany (Schöpp) 🔨	0	0	2	1	0	0	0	2	0	0	5
United States (Schoeneberg)	2	1	0	0	0	1	1	0	2	1	8

Draw 5
Wednesday, February 11, 19:00

Sheet B	1	2	3	4	5	6	7	8	9	10	Final
United States (Schoeneberg)	0	0	1	2	0	1	0	1	0	X	5
Denmark (Lavrsen) 🔨	2	3	0	0	1	0	1	0	1	X	8

Draw 7
Friday, February 13, 9:00

Sheet A	1	2	3	4	5	6	7	8	9	10	Final
United States (Schoeneberg) 🔨	1	2	1	0	1	3	0	2	X	X	10
Japan (Ohkutsu)	0	0	0	0	0	0	2	0	X	X	2

Draw 2
Monday, February 9, 19:00

Sheet C	1	2	3	4	5	6	7	8	9	10	Final
Sweden (Gustafson)	1	0	1	1	0	2	2	0	1	X	8
United States (Schoeneberg) 🔨	0	0	0	0	3	0	0	2	0	X	5

Draw 4
Wednesday, February 11, 9:00

Sheet D	1	2	3	4	5	6	7	8	9	10	Final
Great Britain (Hay) 🔨	0	3	2	0	2	0	0	0	1	X	8
United States (Schoeneberg)	0	0	0	2	0	1	1	1	0	X	5

Draw 6
Thursday, February 12, 14:00

Sheet C	1	2	3	4	5	6	7	8	9	10	11	Final
United States (Schoeneberg) 🔨	2	0	0	1	1	0	1	0	2	1	0	8
Norway (Nordby)	0	2	1	0	0	3	0	2	0	0	1	9

== Figure skating ==
Tara Lipinski became the youngest competitor in Winter Olympics history to earn a gold medal in an individual event.

Individual

Athlete	Event	SP	FS	Total	
Athlete	Event	Rank	Rank	TFP	Rank
Todd Eldredge	Men's singles	3	4	5.5	4
Michael Weiss	Men's singles	11	6	11.5	7
Nicole Bobek	Ladies' singles	17	17	25.5	17
Michelle Kwan	Ladies' singles	1	2	2.5	2nd place, silver medalist(s)
Tara Lipinski	Ladies' singles	2	1	2.0	1st place, gold medalist(s)

Mixed

Athlete	Event	CD1	CD2	SP / OD	FD / FD	Total	
Athlete	Event	Rank	Rank	Rank	Rank	TFP	Rank
Kyoko Ina; Jason Dungjen	Pairs	—N/a		4	4	6.0	4
Jenni Meno; Todd Sand	Pairs	—N/a		6	9	12.0	8
Jessica Joseph; Charles Butler	Ice dancing	22	20	20	21	41.4	21
Elizabeth Punsalan; Jerod Swallow	Ice dancing	7	7	7	7	14.0	7

== Freestyle skiing ==
Aerials
Men

Athlete	Event	Qualification				Final			
Athlete	Event	Jump 1	Jump 2	Total	Rank	Jump 1	Jump 2	Total	Rank
Eric Bergoust	Aerials	121.04	111.57	232.61	4 Q	133.05	122.59	255.64	1st place, gold medalist(s)
Matt Chojnacki	Aerials	81.65	83.43	165.08	21	Did not advance			
Mariano Ferrario	Aerials	111.17	75.81	186.98	15	Did not advance			
Britt Swartley	Aerials	126.60	120.48	247.08	2 Q	121.70	109.91	231.61	5

Women

Athlete	Event	Qualification				Final			
Athlete	Event	Jump 1	Jump 2	Total	Rank	Jump 1	Jump 2	Total	Rank
Stacey Blumer	Aerials	84.00	46.91	130.90	20	Did not advance			
Tracy Evans	Aerials	88.96	58.27	147.23	17	Did not advance			
Nikki Stone	Aerials	78.10	95.90	174.00	4 Q	98.15	94.85	193.00	1st place, gold medalist(s)

Moguls
Men

Athlete	Event	Qualification			Final		
Athlete	Event	Time	Points	Rank	Time	Points	Rank
Evan Dybvig	Moguls	DNF	4.55	31	Did not advance		
Jim Moran	Moguls	28.05	22.90	23	Did not advance		
Jonny Moseley	Moguls	25.78	26.53	1 Q	25.10	26.93	1st place, gold medalist(s)
Alexander Wilson	Moguls	28.10	24.32	10 Q	26.31	24.68	10

Women

Athlete	Event	Qualification			Final		
Athlete	Event	Time	Points	Rank	Time	Points	Rank
Ann Battelle	Moguls	34.01	21.24	16 Q	31.89	23.65	10
Liz McIntyre	Moguls	34.77	23.07	3 Q	32.79	23.72	8
Donna Weinbrecht	Moguls	33.47	23.35	1 Q	33.40	24.02	4

== Ice hockey ==
Summary

Team	Event	Preliminary round						First round				Quarterfinal	Semifinal	Final / BM	
Team	Event	Opposition Score	Opposition Score	Opposition Score	Opposition Score	Opposition Score	Rank	Opposition Score	Opposition Score	Opposition Score	Rank	Opposition Score	Opposition Score	Opposition Score	Rank
United States men's	Men's tournament	Bye			—N/a		Bye	Sweden; L 2–4	Belarus; W 5–2	Canada; L 1–4	3 Q	Czech Republic; L 1–4	Did not advance		6
United States women's	Women's tournament	China; W 5–0	Sweden; W 7–1	Finland; W 4–2	Japan; W 10–0	Canada; W 7–4	1 Q	—N/a						Canada; W 3–1	1st place, gold medalist(s)

=== Men's tournament ===
Roster
The following is the United States roster for the men's ice hockey tournament at the 1998 Winter Olympics.

Head coach: Ron Wilson

Assistant coaches: John Cunniff, Paul Holmgren, Jeff Jackson

No.	Pos.	Name	Height	Weight	Birthdate	Team
2	D	Brian Leetch (A)	6 ft 1 in (185 cm)	187 lb (85 kg)	March 3, 1968 (aged 29)	(United States) New York Rangers
3	D	Derian Hatcher	6 ft 5 in (196 cm)	245 lb (111 kg)	June 4, 1972 (aged 25)	(United States) Dallas Stars
4	D	Kevin Hatcher	6 ft 3 in (191 cm)	231 lb (105 kg)	September 9, 1966 (aged 31)	(United States) Pittsburgh Penguins
5	D	Mathieu Schneider	5 ft 11 in (180 cm)	192 lb (87 kg)	June 12, 1969 (aged 28)	(Canada) Toronto Maple Leafs
6	D	Bryan Berard	6 ft 2 in (188 cm)	220 lb (100 kg)	March 5, 1977 (aged 20)	(United States) New York Islanders
7	D	Chris Chelios (C)	5 ft 11 in (180 cm)	191 lb (87 kg)	January 25, 1962 (aged 36)	(United States) Chicago Blackhawks
9	F	Mike Modano	6 ft 3 in (191 cm)	210 lb (95 kg)	June 7, 1970 (aged 27)	(United States) Dallas Stars
10	F	John LeClair	6 ft 3 in (191 cm)	225 lb (102 kg)	July 5, 1969 (aged 28)	(United States) Philadelphia Flyers
11	F	Tony Amonte	6 ft 0 in (183 cm)	202 lb (92 kg)	August 2, 1970 (aged 27)	(United States) Chicago Blackhawks
12	F	Bill Guerin	6 ft 2 in (188 cm)	220 lb (100 kg)	November 9, 1970 (aged 27)	(Canada) Edmonton Oilers
15	F	Brett Hull	5 ft 11 in (180 cm)	201 lb (91 kg)	August 9, 1964 (aged 33)	(United States) St. Louis Blues
16	F	Pat LaFontaine	5 ft 10 in (178 cm)	181 lb (82 kg)	February 22, 1965 (aged 32)	(United States) New York Rangers
17	F	Keith Tkachuk (A)	6 ft 2 in (188 cm)	235 lb (107 kg)	March 28, 1972 (aged 25)	(United States) Phoenix Coyotes
18	F	Adam Deadmarsh	6 ft 0 in (183 cm)	205 lb (93 kg)	May 10, 1975 (aged 22)	(United States) Colorado Avalanche
19	F	Doug Weight	5 ft 11 in (180 cm)	196 lb (89 kg)	January 21, 1971 (aged 27)	(Canada) Edmonton Oilers
20	D	Gary Suter	6 ft 0 in (183 cm)	205 lb (93 kg)	June 24, 1964 (aged 33)	(United States) Chicago Blackhawks
24	D	Keith Carney	6 ft 1 in (185 cm)	207 lb (94 kg)	February 3, 1970 (aged 28)	(United States) Chicago Blackhawks
25	F	Jamie Langenbrunner	6 ft 1 in (185 cm)	202 lb (92 kg)	July 24, 1975 (aged 22)	(United States) Dallas Stars
27	F	Jeremy Roenick	6 ft 1 in (185 cm)	205 lb (93 kg)	January 17, 1970 (aged 28)	(United States) Phoenix Coyotes
29	F	Joel Otto	6 ft 5 in (196 cm)	220 lb (100 kg)	October 29, 1961 (aged 36)	(United States) Philadelphia Flyers
31	G	Guy Hebert	5 ft 11 in (180 cm)	185 lb (84 kg)	January 7, 1967 (aged 31)	(United States) Mighty Ducks of Anaheim
34	G	John Vanbiesbrouck	5 ft 8 in (173 cm)	176 lb (80 kg)	September 4, 1963 (aged 34)	(United States) Florida Panthers
35	G	Mike Richter	5 ft 11 in (180 cm)	185 lb (84 kg)	September 22, 1966 (aged 31)	(United States) New York Rangers

First round

Pos	Team	Pld	W	D	L	GF	GA	GD	Pts	Qualification
1	Canada	3	3	0	0	12	3	+9	6	Quarterfinals
2	Sweden	3	2	0	1	11	7	+4	4	Quarterfinals
3	United States	3	1	0	2	8	10	−2	2	Quarterfinals
4	Belarus	3	0	0	3	4	15	−11	0	Quarterfinals

Source: Olympedia

All times are local (UTC+9).

13 February 1998; 14:45	Sweden	4–2 (1–2, 2–0, 1–0)	United States	The Big Hat, Nagano, Japan; Attendance: 9,985

Tommy Salo
Goalies
Mike Richter
Referee:
(Canada) Bill McCreary
Linesmen:
(Canada) Gérard Gauthier
(Canada) Troy Sartison

	0–1	11:10 – Chelios (Guerin, Tkachuk)
Alfredsson (Forsberg) (PP) – 12:26	1–1
	1–2	12:50 – Modano (Guerin)
Kjellberg (Renberg, Samuelsson) – 21:50	2–2
Alfredsson (Forsberg) – 31:33	3–2
Sundin (Andersson) – 57:04	4–2

16 min
Penalties
20 min
20
Shots
31

14 February 1998; 14:45	United States	5–2 (2–1, 1–0, 2–1)	Belarus	The Big Hat, Nagano, Japan; Attendance: 9,975

Mike Richter
Goalies
Andrei Mezin
Referee:
(Canada) Kerry Fraser
Linesmen:
(Canada) Gérard Gauthier
(Canada) Troy Sartison

Chelios (LaFontaine) (PP) – 9:06	1–0
LaFontaine (Leetch, K. Hatcher) (PP) – 10:31	2–0
	2–1	18:02 – Karachun (Lozhkin, Galchenyuk)
Leetch (LeClair, Hull) (PP) – 28:16	3–1
	3–2	40:27 – Pankov (Skabelka, Bekbulatov)
Hull (Weight, K. Hatcher) (PP) – 53:45	4–2
Deadmarsh (Guerin, Roenick) – 58:14	5–2

14 min
Penalties
16 min
31
Shots
30

14 February 1998; 18:45	Sweden	2–3 (1–0, 0–3, 1–0)	Canada	The Big Hat, Nagano, Japan; Attendance: 9,945

Tommy Salo
Goalies
Patrick Roy
Referee:
(United States) Mark Faucette
Linesmen:
(United States) Kevin Collins
(Finland) Janne Rautavuori

Lidström (Alfredsson, Renberg) (PP) – 15:27	1–0
	1–1	31:56 – Nieuwendyk (Blake, Lindros)
	1–2	37:02 – MacInnis (Nieuwendyk) (PP)
	1–3	39:53 – Blake (Nieuwendyk, Fleury)
Sundin (Lidström, Norström) – 49:31	2–3

14 min
Penalties
14 min
30
Shots
29

Quarterfinal

18 February 1998; 14:45	Czech Republic	4–1 (0–1, 3–0, 1–0)	United States	The Big Hat, Nagano, Japan; Attendance: 9,822

Dominik Hašek
Goalies
Mike Richter
John Vanbiesbrouck
Referee:
(Canada) Bill McCreary
Linesmen:
(Russia) Alexander Poliakov
(Canada) Ray Scapinello

	0–1	16:12 – Modano (Amonte, Tkachuk)
Růžička (Jágr, Straka) – 28:21	1–1
Jágr (Dopita) – 29:19	2–1
Ručinský (Lang, Šmehlík) – 36:35	3–1
Dopita – 59:21	4–1

6 min
Penalties
8 min
19
Shots
39

=== Women's tournament ===
Roster
The following is the United States roster for the women's ice hockey tournament at the 1998 Winter Olympics.

Head coach: (United States) Ben Smith
Assistant coach: (United States) Tom Mutch

No.	Pos.	Name	Height	Weight	Birthdate	Birthplace	1996–97 team
1	G	Sara DeCosta	5 ft 9 in (1.75 m)	130 lb (59 kg)	13 May 1977 (aged 20)	Warwick, Rhode Island	(United States) Providence College
2	D	Tara Mounsey	5 ft 6 in (1.68 m)	150 lb (68 kg)	12 March 1978 (aged 19)	Concord, New Hampshire	(United States) Brown University
3	F	Lisa Brown-Miller	5 ft 1 in (1.55 m)	128 lb (58 kg)	16 November 1966 (aged 31)	Union Lake, Michigan	(United States) National Team
4	D	Angela Ruggiero	5 ft 9 in (1.75 m)	175 lb (79 kg)	3 January 1980 (aged 18)	Panorama City, California	(United States) Choate Rosemary Hall
5	D	Colleen Coyne	5 ft 3 in (1.60 m)	131 lb (59 kg)	19 September 1971 (aged 26)	Medford, Massachusetts	(United States) National Team
6	F	Karyn Bye – A	5 ft 8 in (1.73 m)	160 lb (73 kg)	18 May 1971 (aged 26)	River Falls, Wisconsin	(United States) National Team
7	D	Sue Merz	5 ft 5 in (1.65 m)	145 lb (66 kg)	10 April 1972 (aged 25)	Greenwich, Connecticut	(Canada) Newtonbrook Panthers
8	F	Laurie Baker	5 ft 6 in (1.68 m)	140 lb (64 kg)	6 November 1976 (aged 21)	Concord, Massachusetts	(United States) Providence College
9	F	Sandra Whyte	5 ft 7 in (1.70 m)	130 lb (59 kg)	24 August 1970 (aged 27)	Saugus, Massachusetts	(United States) National Team
11	F	A. J. Mleczko	5 ft 11 in (1.80 m)	160 lb (73 kg)	14 June 1975 (aged 22)	Nantucket, Massachusetts	(United States) National Team
12	F	Jenny Schmidgall	5 ft 3 in (1.60 m)	130 lb (59 kg)	12 January 1979 (aged 19)	Saint Paul, Minnesota	(United States) Edina High School
14	D	Vicki Movsessian	5 ft 5 in (1.65 m)	140 lb (64 kg)	6 November 1972 (aged 25)	Lexington, Massachusetts	(United States) National Team
15	F	Shelley Looney	5 ft 5 in (1.65 m)	140 lb (64 kg)	21 January 1972 (aged 26)	Brownstown Township, Michigan	(United States) National Team
18	F	Alana Blahoski	5 ft 7 in (1.70 m)	127 lb (58 kg)	29 April 1974 (aged 23)	Saint Paul, Minnesota	(United States) National Team
20	F	Katie King	5 ft 8 in (1.73 m)	165 lb (75 kg)	24 May 1975 (aged 22)	Salem, New Hampshire	(United States) Brown University
21	F	Cammi Granato – C	5 ft 7 in (1.70 m)	140 lb (64 kg)	25 March 1971 (aged 26)	Downers Grove, Illinois	(United States) Concordia University
22	F	Gretchen Ulion	5 ft 2 in (1.57 m)	130 lb (59 kg)	4 May 1972 (aged 25)	Marlborough, Connecticut	(United States) National Team
24	D	Chris Bailey	5 ft 6 in (1.68 m)	160 lb (73 kg)	5 February 1972 (aged 26)	Marietta, New York	(United States) National Team
25	F	Tricia Dunn	5 ft 8 in (1.73 m)	142 lb (64 kg)	25 April 1974 (aged 23)	Derry, New Hampshire	(United States) National Team
29	G	Sarah Tueting	5 ft 7 in (1.70 m)	140 lb (64 kg)	26 April 1976 (aged 21)	Winnetka, Illinois	(United States) National Team

Preliminary round

Pos	Team	Pld	W	D	L	GF	GA	GD	Pts	Qualification
1	United States	5	5	0	0	33	7	+26	10	Gold medal game
2	Canada	5	4	0	1	28	12	+16	8	Gold medal game
3	Finland	5	3	0	2	27	10	+17	6	Bronze medal game
4	China	5	2	0	3	10	15	−5	4	Bronze medal game
5	Sweden	5	1	0	4	10	21	−11	2	
6	Japan (H)	5	0	0	5	2	45	−43	0	

(H) Hosts

All times are local (UTC+9).

8 February 1998; 20:00	China	0–5 (0–2, 0–1, 0–2)	United States	Aqua Wing Arena; Attendance: 3,255

Game reference

Guo Hong
Goalies
Sarah Tueting
Referee:
Laurie Taylor-Bolton
Linesmen:
Isabelle Giguère
Sandra Dombrowski

0–1	07:39 – Granato (Ulion, Schmidgall) (PP)
0–2	19:17 – Bye (Mounsey) (PP)
0–3	34:53 – Mounsey (King)
0–4	51:05 – Schmidgall (Bye)
0–5	56:20 – Granato (King)

14 min
Penalties
10 min
10
Shots
31

9 February 1998; 16:00	United States	7–1 (1–1, 4–0, 2–0)	Sweden	Aqua Wing Arena; Attendance: 3,607

Game reference

Sara DeCosta
Goalies
Annica Åhlén
Referee:
Manuela Gröger
Linesmen:
Isabelle Giguère
Marina Zenk

	0–1	10:02 – Morelius (Sjölander, Holst) (PP)
Baker (Merz) – 16:27	1–1
Bye (Merz, Mounsey) (PP) – 32:39	2–1
King (Blahoski) – 34:26	3–1
Merz – 36:20	4–1
Bye (SH) – 38:39	5–1
Ulion (Granato) (PP) – 54:28	6–1
Looney (SH) – 55:30	7–1

14 min
Penalties
24 min
47
Shots
3

11 February 1998; 20:00	United States	4–2 (1–1, 3–1, 0–0)	Finland	Aqua Wing Arena; Attendance: 3,688

Game reference

Sarah Tueting
Goalies
Tuula Puputti
Referee:
Marina Zenk
Linesmen:
Isabelle Giguère
Laurie Taylor-Bolton

Movsessian (King) – 02:48	1–0
	1–1	18:09 – Hänninen (Lehto, Nieminen) (PP)
Bye (Schmidgall) – 21:22	2–1
	2–2	25:27 – Nieminen (SH)
Mounsey (Bye, Merz) (PP) – 26:49	3–2
Ulion (Bye) – 36:56	4–2

18 min
Penalties
10 min
25
Shots
22

12 February 1998; 16:00	United States	10–0 (5–0, 2–0, 3–0)	Japan	Aqua Wing Arena; Attendance: 5,015

Sara DeCosta
Goalies
Haruka Watanabe
Yuka Oda
Referee:
Laurie Taylor-Bolton
Linesmen:
Isabelle Giguère
Sigrid Nonas

Looney – 03:55	1–0
Mleczko (Merz) – 09:08	2–0
Whyte (Granato) – 13:32	3–0
Looney (Ulion, Schmidgall) (PP) – 14:14	4–0
Mleczko (Brown-Miller, Looney) – 14:36	5–0
King (Baker, Bailey) – 29:18	6–0
King (Blahoski, Baker) – 39:34	7–0
Baker (Granato) (PP) – 45:37	8–0
Bye (Mounsey, Ulion) (PP) – 51:46	9–0
King (Baker) – 53:03	10–0

8 min
Penalties
12 min
56
Shots
4

14 February 1998; 20:00	Canada	4–7 (1–1, 0–0, 3–6)	United States	Aqua Wing Arena; Attendance: 5,872

Lesley Reddon
Goalies
Sarah Tueting
Sara DeCosta
Referee:
Manuela Gröger
Linesmen:
Johanna Kuisma
Sigrid Nonas

Dupuis (Sunohara) (PP) – 03:01	1–0
	1–1	19:20 – Granato (PP)
Dupuis (Brisson) (PP) – 41:24	2–1
Hefford (Dupuis) (PP2) – 45:28	3–1
Brisson (Wilson, Wickenheiser) (PP) – 45:53	4–1
	4–2	47:05 – Baker (King)
	4–3	50:57 – Granato (Ulion, Mounsey) (PP2)
	4–4	52:25 – Schmidgall (Granato) (PP)
	4–5	52:48 – Dunn (Mleczko)
	4–6	57:06 – Brown-Miller (Mleczko)
	4–7	58:58 – Baker (ENG)

18 min
Penalties
30 min
35
Shots
30

Gold medal game

17 February 1998; 18:00	(gold) United States	3–1 (0–0, 1–0, 2–1)	Canada (silver)	Big Hat; Attendance: 8,626

Game reference

Sarah Tueting
Goalies
Manon Rhéaume
Referee:
Marina Zenk
Linesmen:
Isabelle Giguère
Debra Parece

Ulion (Whyte, Merz) (PP) − 22:38	1–0
Looney (Whyte, Ulion) (PP) − 50:57	2–0
	2–1	55:59 − Goyette (Wickenheiser, Heaney) (PP)
Whyte (ENG) − 59:52	3–1

8 min
Penalties
6 min
24
Shots
22

== Luge ==
Men

Athlete	Event	Run 1		Run 2		Run 3		Run 4		Total	
Athlete	Event	Time	Rank	Time	Rank	Time	Rank	Time	Rank	Time	Rank
Larry Dolan	Singles	50.558	15	50.163	12	50.140	12	50.267	12	3:21.128	13
Adam Heidt	Singles	50.401	13	49.899	8	49.971	9	49.827	4	3:20.098	9
Wendel Suckow	Singles	50.069	6	49.871	7	49.908	6	49.880	5	3:19.728	6
Mark Grimmette; Brian Martin	Doubles	50.716	3	50.501	2	—N/a				1:41.217	3rd place, bronze medalist(s)
Chris Thorpe; Gordy Sheer	Doubles	50.634	2	50.493	1	—N/a				1:41.127	2nd place, silver medalist(s)

Women

Athlete	Event	Run 1		Run 2		Run 3		Run 4		Total	
Athlete	Event	Time	Rank	Time	Rank	Time	Rank	Time	Rank	Time	Rank
Bethany Calcaterra-McMahon	Singles	51.696	7	51.651	7	51.296	7	50.915	8	3:25.5558	8
Cammy Myler	Singles	51.795	9	51.654	8	51.219	6	50.807	6	3:25.475	7
Erin Warren	Singles	51.644	6	51.461	6	51.364	8	50.859	7	3:25.328	6

== Nordic combined ==
Athlete	Event	Ski jumping				Cross-country		Total	
Athlete	Event	Jump 1	Jump 2	Total	Rank	Time	Rank	Time	Rank
Bill Demong	Individual	110.5	98.0	208.5	19	44:03.9	40	47:18.9	34
Dave Jarrett	Individual	105.5	89.5	195.0	34	42:16.0	25	46:52.0	30
Todd Lodwick	Individual	101.0	116.0	217.0	13	42:33.4	28	44:57.4	20
Tim Tetreault	Individual	94.0	96.5	190.5	39	42:45.5	29	47:48.5	36
Bill Demong; Dave Jarrett; Todd Lodwick; Tim Tetreault	Team	—N/a		807.0	9	55:53.6	6	58:38.6	10

== Short track speed skating ==
Men

Athlete	Event	Heat		Quarterfinal		Semifinal		Final	
Athlete	Event	Time	Rank	Time	Rank	Time	Rank	Time	Rank
Andy Gabel	500 m	43.899	2 Q	44.124	3 ADV	59.811	4 QB	43.072	7
Rusty Smith	500 m	44.584	3	Did not advance					
Dan Weinstein	500 m	43.492	3	Did not advance					
Andy Gabel	1000 m	1:31.672	2 Q	1:35.641	3 ADV	1:32.985	1 QA	1:33.518	4
Scott Koons	1000 m	1:31.110	4	Did not advance					
Rusty Smith	1000 m	1:33.326	1 Q	1:39.775	4	Did not advance			
Eric Flaim; Andy Gabel; Tommy O'Hare; Rusty Smith	5000 m relay	—N/a				7:16.724	4 QB	7:02.014	6

Qualification legend: ADV – Advanced due to being impeded by another skater; FA – Qualify to medal round; FB – Qualify to consolation round.

Women

Athlete	Event	Heat		Quarterfinal		Semifinal		Final	
Athlete	Event	Time	Rank	Time	Rank	Time	Rank	Time	Rank
Erin Gleason	500 m	48.767	2 Q	46.425	4	Did not advance			
Erin Porter	500 m	1:04.113	4	Did not advance					
Amy Peterson	500 m	46.764	3	Did not advance					
Erin Gleason	1000 m	1:36.965	3	Did not advance					
Erin Porter	1000 m	1:52.939	4	Did not advance					
Amy Peterson	1000 m	1:33.530	1 Q	1:36.274	2 Q	1:35.644	4 QB	1:37.348	4
Erin Gleason; Caroline Hallisey; Amy Peterson; Erin Porter; Cathy Turner	3000 m relay	—N/a				4:33.352	4 QB	4:26.253	5

Qualification legend: FA – Qualify to medal round; FB – Qualify to consolation round.

== Ski jumping ==
Athlete	Event	Jump 1			Jump 2			Total	
Athlete	Event	Distance	Points	Rank	Distance	Points	Rank	Points	Rank
Alan Alborn	Normal hill	74.0	79.5	42	Did not advance				
Casey Colby	Normal hill	73.0	79.5	42	Did not advance				
Brendan Doran	Normal hill	68.5	69.5	52	Did not advance				
Randy Weber	Normal hill	71.0	74.5	49	Did not advance				
Alan Alborn	Large hill	102.5	82.5	44	Did not advance				
Casey Colby	Large hill	109.0	96.2	29 Q	97.0	69.6	30	165.8	30
Brendan Doran	Large hill	91.5	58.7	58	Did not advance				
Randy Weber	Large hill	98.5	75.3	50	Did not advance				
Alan Alborn; Casey Colby; Mike Keuler; Randy Weber	Team large hill	—N/a	211.5	—N/a		279.2	—N/a	490.7	12

== Snowboarding ==
Alpine
Men

Athlete	Event	Race 1	Race 2	Total	
Athlete	Event	Time	Time	Time	Rank
Adam Hostetter	Giant slalom	DSQ			
Mike Jacoby	Giant slalom	1:03.53	1:08.27	2:11.80	17
Chris Klug	Giant slalom	59.38	1:05.87	2:05.25	6

Women

Athlete	Event	Race 1	Race 2	Total	
Athlete	Event	Time	Time	Time	Rank
Rosey Fletcher	Giant slalom	DNF			
Lisa Kosglow	Giant slalom	DNF			
Betsy Shaw	Giant slalom	DSQ			
Sondra Van Ert	Giant slalom	1:17.89	1:08.67	2:26.56	12

Freestyle
Men

Athlete	Event	Qualifying round 1		Qualifying round 2		Final	
Athlete	Event	Points	Rank	Points	Rank	Points	Rank
Ron Chiodi	Halfpipe	29.0	31	32.1	23	Did not advance	
Ross Powers	Halfpipe	38.0	10	39.4	7 Q	82.1	3rd place, bronze medalist(s)
Todd Richards	Halfpipe	32.4	26	39.5	6 Q	69.6	16

Women

Athlete	Event	Qualifying round 1		Qualifying round 2		Final	
Athlete	Event	Points	Rank	Points	Rank	Points	Rank
Cara-Beth Burnside	Halfpipe	36.7	2 Q	Bye		72.6	4
Barrett Christy	Halfpipe	30.3	14	31.6	10	Did not advance	
Shannon Dunn	Halfpipe	33.3	7	36.6	2 Q	72.8	3rd place, bronze medalist(s)
Michelle Taggart	Halfpipe	26.1	18	25.5	15	Did not advance	

== Speed skating ==
Men

Athlete	Event	Race 1		Race 2		Total	
Athlete	Event	Time	Rank	Time	Rank	Time	Rank
Cory Carpenter	500 m	37.35	39	37.76	36	75.11	36
Dave Cruikshank	500 m	36.67	21	36.86	28	73.53	25
Casey FitzRandolph	500 m	35.81	3	36.39	13	72.20	6
Marc Pelchat	500 m	36.94	32	36.41	15	73.35	23
K. C. Boutiette	1000 m	—N/a				1:11.75	8
Cory Carpenter	1000 m	—N/a				1:13.03	29
Casey FitzRandolph	1000 m	—N/a				1:11.64	7
Nate Mills	1000 m	—N/a				1:12.61	23
K. C. Boutiette	1500 m	—N/a				1:50.04	5
Cory Carpenter	1500 m	—N/a				1:53.50	32
Casey FitzRandolph	1500 m	—N/a				1:53.26	31
Dave Tamburrino	1500 m	—N/a				1:54.91	35
K. C. Boutiette	5000 m	—N/a				6:39.67	14
Dave Tamburrino	5000 m	—N/a				6:41.19	16
K. C. Boutiette	10000 m	—N/a				13:44.03	8
Dave Tamburrino	10000 m	—N/a				14:12.00	16

Women

Athlete	Event	Race 1		Race 2		Total	
Athlete	Event	Time	Rank	Time	Rank	Time	Rank
Moira D'Andrea	500 m	39.83	18	40.09	23	79.92	19
Amy Sannes	500 m	40.41	27	40.49	26	80.90	26
Becky Sundstrom	500 m	40.20	25	39.66	15	79.86	17
Chris Witty	500 m	39.09	6	39.44	12	78.53	10
Moira D'Andrea	1000 m	—N/a				1:18.38	9
Jennifer Rodriguez	1000 m	—N/a				1:19.19	13
Becky Sundstrom	1000 m	—N/a				1:18.23	6
Chris Witty	1000 m	—N/a				1:16.79	2nd place, silver medalist(s)
Moira D'Andrea	1500 m	—N/a				2:02.47	14
Jennifer Rodriguez	1500 m	—N/a				2:00.97	8
Becky Sundstrom	1500 m	—N/a				2:01.81	12
Chris Witty	1500 m	—N/a				1:58.97	3rd place, bronze medalist(s)
Kirstin Holum	3000 m	—N/a				4:12.24	6
Catherine Raney-Norman	3000 m	—N/a				4:22.55	22
Jennifer Rodriguez	3000 m	—N/a				4:11.64	4
Kirstin Holum	5000 m	—N/a				7:14.20	7
Jennifer Rodriguez	5000 m	—N/a				7:16.78	10
