= Cross-country skiing at the 1998 Winter Olympics – Men's 15 kilometre freestyle pursuit =

Men's 15 kilometre freestyle pursuit at the XVIII Olympic Winter Games
- Venue: Snow Harp
- Dates: 14 February 1998
- Competitors: 87 from 29 nations
- Winning time: 39:37.7

Medalists
1st place, gold medalist(s)		Thomas Alsgaard; Norway
2nd place, silver medalist(s)		Bjørn Dæhlie; Norway
3rd place, bronze medalist(s)		Vladimir Smirnov; Kazakhstan

The men's 15 kilometre freestyle pursuit cross-country skiing competition at the 1998 Winter Olympics in Nagano, Japan, was held on 14 February at Snow Harp.

The startlist for this race was based on the 10 km classical event from earlier in the games. The winner of the 10 km classical event, Bjørn Dæhlie of Norway, was the first starter in the pursuit. The rest of the competitors started behind Dæhlie with the same number of seconds that they were behind him at the 10 km classical event. The winner of the race was the first competitor to finish the pursuit.

== Background ==
At the previous Olympics, Bjørn Dæhlie successfully defended his gold medal. The silver medalist, Vladimir Smirnov, and the bronze medalist, Silvio Fauner both qualified for the event. Dæhlie was the 1997 world champion.

== Results ==
Rank	Bib	Name	Country	Start	Time	Deficit
1st place, gold medalist(s)	5	Thomas Alsgaard	Norway	0:24	39:37.7	
2nd place, silver medalist(s)	1	Bjørn Dæhlie	Norway	0:00	39:38.8	+1.1
3rd place, bronze medalist(s)	4	Vladimir Smirnov	Kazakhstan	0:21	40:07.5	+29.8
4	10	Silvio Fauner	Italy	0:51	40:24.9	+47.2
5	11	Fulvio Valbusa	Italy	0:53	40:25.1	+47.4
6	3	Mika Myllylä	Finland	0:16	40:26.6	+48.9
7	2	Markus Gandler	Austria	0:08	40:50.2	+1:12.5
8	15	Jari Isometsä	Finland	1:12	40:55.4	+1:17.7
9	22	Sergei Tchepikov	Russia	1:31	41:00.3	+1:22.6
10	25	Niklas Jonsson	Sweden	1:40	41:01.7	+1:24.0
11	23	Achim Walcher	Austria	1:34	41:02.9	+1:25.2
12	16	Andreas Schlütter	Germany	1:24	41:08.3	+1:30.6
13	28	Fabio Maj	Italy	1:49	41:31.4	+1:53.7
14	12	Alois Stadlober	Austria	0:57	41:33.1	+1:55.4
15	6	Jaak Mae	Estonia	0:32	41:38.7	+2:01.0
16	14	Gerhard Urain	Austria	1:01	41:40.8	+2:03.1
17	27	Johann Mühlegg	Germany	1:48	41:48.3	+2:10.6
18	31	Alexey Prokourorov	Russia	2:03	42:24.1	+2:46.4
19	24	Vincent Vittoz	France	1:39	42:31.9	+2:54.2
20	18	Sami Repo	Finland	1:27	42:38.9	+3:01.2
21	34	Katsuhito Ebisawa	Japan	2:06	42:46.0	+3:08.3
22	36	Mitsuo Horigome	Japan	2:20	42:47.1	+3:09.4
23	32	Petr Michl	Czech Republic	2:04	42:47.5	+3:09.8
24	29	Masaaki Kozu	Japan	1:59	42:59.9	+3:22.2
25	42	Sergey Kriyanin	Russia	2:39	43:09.4	+3:31.7
26	39	Alexander Sannikov	Belarus	2:30	43:16.9	+3:39.2
27	9	Sture Sivertsen	Norway	0:46	43:29.3	+3:51.6
28	19	Hiroyuki Imai	Japan	1:27	43:31.0	+3:53.3
29	38	René Sommerfeldt	Germany	2:28	43:49.5	+4:11.8
30	20	Patrick Remy	France	1:31	43:56.8	+4:19.1
31	56	Henrik Forsberg	Sweden	3:31	44:04.9	+4:27.2
32	45	Lukas Bauer	Czech Republic	2:47	44:16.3	+4:38.6
33	61	Ivan Batory	Slovakia	3:43	44:18.2	+4:40.5
34	57	Stephan Kunz	Liechtenstein	3:32	44:18.9	+4:41.2
35	21	Markus Hasler	Liechtenstein	1:31	44:31.9	+4:54.2
36	50	Pavel Riabinine	Kazakhstan	3:13	44:41.7	+5:04.0
37	35	Martin Koukal	Czech Republic	2:17	44:41.8	+5:04.1
38	67	Martin Bajcicak	Slovakia	4:05	44:54.6	+5:16.9
39	62	Vladimir Legotine	Russia	3:46	44:55.5	+5:17.8
40	43	Patrick Weaver	United States	2:40	45:07.1	+5:29.4
41	46	Michael Binzer	Denmark	2:50	45:12.0	+5:34.3
42	30	Ricardas Panavas	Lithuania	2:00	45:12.3	+5:34.6
43	58	Elmo Kassin	Estonia	3:33	45:13.2	+5:35.5
44	47	Justin Wadsworth	United States	3:02	45:18.0	+5:40.3
45	69	Zsolt Antal	Romania	4:17	45:19.9	+5:42.2
46	60	Gennadiy Nikon	Ukraine	3:43	45:20.1	+5:42.4
47	41	John Bauer	United States	2:34	45:24.6	+5:46.9
48	68	Andrey Nevzorov	Kazakhstan	4:06	45:30.7	+5:53.0
49	63	Wilhelm Aschwanden	Switzerland	3:46	45:32.8	+5:55.1
50	52	Lubos Buchta	Czech Republic	3:14	45:36.6	+5:58.9
51	44	Vladislavas Zybailo	Lithuania	2:45	46:12.9	+6:35.2
52	72	Mikhailo Artyukhov	Ukraine	4:28	46:28.5	+6:50.8
53	76	Janusz Krezelok	Poland	4:38	47:13.3	+7:35.6
54	54	Jordi Ribo	Spain	3:21	47:27.3	+7:49.6
55	66	Anthony Evans	Australia	3:48	47:43.4	+8:05.7
56	51	Chris Blanchard	Canada	3:13	47:44.3	+8:06.6
57	64	Stanislav Jezik	Slovakia	3:47	48:30.3	+8:52.6
58	71	Guido Visser	Canada	4:26	48:43.5	+9:05.8
59	80	Vitaly Lilitchenko	Kazakhstan	5:30	48:58.1	+9:20.4
60	73	Nikolai Semeniako	Belarus	4:30	49:31.3	+9:53.6
61	84	Slavtscho Batinkov	Bulgaria	5:59	49:41.5	+10:03.8
62	82	Alvaro Gijon	Spain	5:38	49:49.2	+10:11.5
63	65	Janis Hermanis	Latvia	3:48	49:55.1	+10:17.4
64	85	Ivan Hudac	Slovakia	6:17	50:14.7	+10:37.0
65	86	Diego Ruiz	Spain	6:53	51:09.2	+11:31.5
66	74	Jin Soo Ahn	South Korea	4:31	51:27.4	+11:49.7
67	79	Park Byeong-ju	South Korea	5:22	51:55.8	+12:18.1
68	81	Jintao Wu	China	5:33	52:28.1	+12:50.4
DNF	33	Juan J. Gutiérrez	Spain	2:05	Did not finish	
DNF	53	Byung-Chul Park	South Korea	3:18	Did not finish	
DNF	55	Nikolay Popovich	Ukraine	3:27	Did not finish	
DNF	70	Aleksey Tregubov	Belarus	4:19	Did not finish	
DNF	77	Juris Germanis	Latvia	4:41	Did not finish	
DNF	87	Paul Gray	Australia	7:21	Did not finish	
DNS	7	Erling Jevne	Norway	0:34	Did not start	
DNS	8	Andrus Veerpalu	Estonia	0:36	Did not start	
DNS	13	Harri Kirvesniemi	Finland	0:58	Did not start	
DNS	17	Beat Koch	Switzerland	1:25	Did not start	
DNS	26	Marco Albarello	Italy	1:46	Did not start	
DNS	37	Raul Olle	Estonia	2:28	Did not start	
DNS	40	Jochen Behle	Germany	2:31	Did not start	
DNS	48	Robin McKeever	Canada	3:08	Did not start	
DNS	49	Jeremias Wigger	Switzerland	3:09	Did not start	
DNS	59	Philippe Sanchez	France	3:39	Did not start	
DNS	75	Yves Bilodeau	Canada	4:38	Did not start	
DNS	78	Marcus Nash	United States	4:47	Did not start	
DNS	83	Roberts Raimo	Latvia	5:45	Did not start	
