= Cross-country skiing at the 1998 Winter Olympics – Men's 30 kilometre classical =

Men's 30 kilometre classical at the XVIII Olympic Winter Games
- Venue: Snow Harp
- Dates: 9 February 1998
- Competitors: 75 from 28 nations
- Winning time: 1:33:55.8

Medalists
1st place, gold medalist(s)		Mika Myllylä; Finland
2nd place, silver medalist(s)		Erling Jevne; Norway
3rd place, bronze medalist(s)		Silvio Fauner; Italy

The men's 30 kilometre classical cross-country skiing competition at the 1998 Winter Olympics in Nagano, Japan, was held on 9 February at Snow Harp. The competitors started with a 30-second interval.

== Results ==
The results:

Rank	Bib	Name	Country	Time	Deficit
1st place, gold medalist(s)	70	Mika Myllylä	Finland	1:33:55.8	—
2nd place, silver medalist(s)	73	Erling Jevne	Norway	1:35:27.1	+1:31.3
3rd place, bronze medalist(s)	71	Silvio Fauner	Italy	1:36:08.5	+2:12.7
4	65	Jari Isometsä	Finland	1:36:51.4	+2:55.6
5	67	Fulvio Valbusa	Italy	1:37:31.1	+3:35.3
6	18	Harri Kirvesniemi	Finland	1:37:45.9	+3:50.1
7	38	Marco Albarello	Italy	1:38:07.1	+4:11.3
8	27	Giorgio Di Centa	Italy	1:38:14.9	+4:19.1
9	42	Vladimir Legotine	Russia	1:38:23.7	+4:27.9
10	32	Per Elofsson	Sweden	1:38:47.0	+4:51.2
11	56	Jaak Mae	Estonia	1:38:52.3	+4:56.5
12	72	Vladimir Smirnov	Kazakhstan	1:38:59.1	+5:03.3
13	54	Pavel Riabinine	Kazakhstan	1:39:31.6	+5:35.8
14	21	Stephan Kunz	Liechtenstein	1:39:33.3	+5:37.5
15	64	Sture Sivertsen	Norway	1:39:44.9	+5:49.1
16	41	Jeremias Wigger	Switzerland	1:39:46.4	+5:50.6
17	29	Raul Olle	Estonia	1:40:03.5	+6:07.7
18	20	Aleksey Tregubov	Belarus	1:40:05.9	+6:10.1
19	52	Andrus Veerpalu	Estonia	1:40:09.9	+6:14.1
20	75	Bjørn Dæhlie	Norway	1:40:18.5	+6:22.7
21	53	Andreas Schlütter	Germany	1:40:27.1	+6:31.3
22	26	Jiri Magal	Czech Republic	1:40:29.6	+6:33.8
23	74	Anders Bergström	Sweden	1:40:44.1	+6:35.0
24	23	Hiroyuki Imai	Japan	1:40:40.9	+6:45.1
25	66	Henrik Forsberg	Sweden	1:40:44.1	+6:48.3
26	48	Ivan Batory	Slovakia	1:40:47.8	+6:52.0
27	39	Katsuhito Ebisawa	Japan	1:40:48.0	+6:52.2
28	49	Martin Bajcicak	Slovakia	1:40:52.5	+6:56.7
29	62	Mikhailo Artyukhov	Ukraine	1:41:13.0	+7:17.2
30	61	Ricardas Panavas	Lithuania	1:41:15.6	+7:19.8
31	11	Aleksandr Kravchenko	Russia	1:41:22.3	+7:26.5
32	30	Sergei Tchepikov	Russia	1:41:59.9	+8:04.1
33	40	Lukas Bauer	Czech Republic	1:42:08.8	+8:13.0
34	46	Sami Repo	Finland	1:42:16.8	+8:21.0
35	55	Markus Hasler	Liechtenstein	1:42:17.4	+8:21.6
36	45	Sergei Dolidovich	Belarus	1:42:18.7	+8:22.9
37	43	Justin Wadsworth	United States	1:42:21.1	+8:25.3
38	34	Gennadiy Nikon	Ukraine	1:42:32.7	+8:36.9
39	31	Maxim Pitchougine	Russia	1:42:41.7	+8:45.9
40	12	Alexander Sannikov	Belarus	1:42:48.0	+8:52.2
41	16	Andrey Nevzorov	Kazakhstan	1:42:48.8	+8:53.0
42	5	Kazutoshi Nagahama	Japan	1:42:58.7	+9:02.9
43	51	Gerhard Urain	Austria	1:43:22.9	+9:27.1
44	6	Olexander Zarovnyi	Ukraine	1:43:26.2	+9:30.4
45	44	Zsolt Antal	Romania	1:43:56.6	+10:00.8
46	17	Stanislav Jezik	Slovakia	1:44:01.0	+10:05.2
47	19	John Bauer	United States	1:44:15.3	+10:19.5
48	28	Alexander Ushkalenko	Ukraine	1:44:15.7	+10:19.9
49	37	Marcus Nash	United States	1:44:37.7	+10:41.9
50	7	Vladimir Bortsov	Kazakhstan	1:45:12.8	+11:17.0
51	36	Anthony Evans	Australia	1:45:26.3	+11:30.5
52	9	Meelis Aasmäe	Estonia	1:46:08.8	+12:13.0
53	13	Beat Koch	Switzerland	1:46:38.3	+12:42.5
54	63	Nikolai Semeniako	Belarus	1:47:32.5	+13:36.7
55	14	Byung-Chul Park	South Korea	1:47:41.5	+13:45.7
56	59	Masaaki Kozu	Japan	1:48:15.3	+14:19.5
57	24	Torald Rein	Germany	1:49:06.7	+15:10.9
58	35	Michael Binzer	Denmark	1:49:42.2	+15:46.4
59	4	Ivan Hudac	Slovakia	1:50:11.6	+16:15.8
60	50	Slavtscho Batinkov	Bulgaria	1:50:35.0	+16:39.2
61	25	Donald Farley	Canada	1:50:47.8	+16:52.0
62	57	Robin McKeever	Canada	1:51:23.5	+17:27.7
63	10	Jin-Soo Ahn	South Korea	1:54:12.2	+20:16.4
64	8	Guido Visser	Canada	1:55:04.1	+21:08.3
DNF	2	Patrick Weaver	United States	—	—
DNF	3	Janis Hermanis	Latvia	—	—
DNF	15	Vladislavas Zybailo	Lithuania	—	—
DNF	33	Jintao Wu	China	—	—
DNF	47	Jochen Behle	Germany	—	—
DNF	58	Patrick Remy	France	—	—
DNF	68	Thomas Alsgaard	Norway	—	—
DNF	69	Lubos Buchta	Czech Republic	—	—
DNS	1	René Sommerfeldt	Germany	—	—
DNS	22	Lars Håland	Sweden	—	—
DNS	60	Antonio Racki	Croatia	—	—
