= Cross-country skiing at the 1998 Winter Olympics – Women's 10 kilometre freestyle pursuit =

Women's 10 kilometre freestyle pursuit at the XVIII Olympic Winter Games
- Venue: Snow Harp
- Dates: 12 February 1998
- Competitors: 78 from 24 nations
- Winning time: 28:29.9

Medalists
| 1st place, gold medalist(s) | | Larisa Lazutina; Russia |
| 2nd place, silver medalist(s) | | Olga Danilova; Russia |
| 3rd place, bronze medalist(s) | | Kateřina Neumannová; Czech Republic |

The women's 10 kilometre freestyle pursuit cross-country skiing competition at the 1998 Winter Olympics in Nagano, Japan, was held on 12 February at Snow Harp.

The startlist for this race was based on the 5 km classical event from earlier in the games. The winner of the 5 km classical event, Larissa Lazutina of Russia, was the first starter in the pursuit. The rest of the competitors started behind Lazutina with the same number of seconds that they were behind her at the 5 km classical event. The winner of the race was the first competitor to finish the pursuit.

== Background ==
At the previous Olympics, Lyubov Yegorova successfully defended her gold medal. However, she was suspended from competition in February of 1997 after failing a doping test. Both the silver medalist, Manuela Di Centa, and bronze medalist, Stefania Belmondo, qualified for the event. Bente Martinsen was the overall leader in the World Cup standings prior to the Olympics. Yelena Välbe was the 1997 world champion.

== Results ==
| Rank | Bib | Name | Country | Start | Time | Deficit |
|---|---|---|---|---|---|---|
| 1st place, gold medalist(s) | 1 | Larisa Lazutina | Russia | 0:00 | 28:29.9 | |
| 2nd place, silver medalist(s) | 5 | Olga Danilova | Russia | 0:14 | 28:36.4 | +6.5 |
| 3rd place, bronze medalist(s) | 2 | Kateřina Neumannová | Czech Republic | 0:05 | 28:37.2 | +7.3 |
| 4 | 11 | Iryna Terelya | Ukraine | 0:40 | 28:40.1 | +10.2 |
| 5 | 12 | Stefania Belmondo | Italy | 0:42 | 28:42.6 | +12.7 |
| 6 | 13 | Yuliya Chepalova | Russia | 0:43 | 28:51.4 | +21.5 |
| 7 | 4 | Nina Gavrylyuk | Russia | 0:13 | 29:12.3 | +42.4 |
| 8 | 7 | Anita Moen-Guidon | Norway | 0:27 | 29:27.6 | +57.7 |
| 9 | 3 | Bente Martinsen | Norway | 0:12 | 29:34.1 | +1:04.2 |
| 10 | 10 | Brigitte Albrecht | Switzerland | 0:39 | 29:34.8 | +1:04.9 |
| 11 | 8 | Trude Dybendahl Hartz | Norway | 0:31 | 29:36.0 | +1:06.1 |
| 12 | 9 | Gabriella Paruzzi | Italy | 0:37 | 29:36.8 | +1:06.9 |
| 13 | 15 | Maria Theurl | Austria | 0:59 | 29:58.8 | +1:28.9 |
| 14 | 6 | Marit Mikkelsplass | Norway | 0:16 | 30:15.3 | +1:45.4 |
| 15 | 20 | Katrin Šmigun | Estonia | 1:11 | 30:16.3 | +1:46.4 |
| 16 | 18 | Satu Salonen | Finland | 1:06 | 30:32.0 | +2:02.1 |
| 17 | 29 | Sabina Valbusa | Italy | 1:23 | 30:34.0 | +2:04.1 |
| 18 | 16 | Jaroslava Bukvajová | Slovakia | 1:02 | 30:34.5 | +2:04.6 |
| 19 | 24 | Antonina Ordina | Sweden | 1:13 | 30:35.6 | +2:05.7 |
| 20 | 19 | Valentyna Shevchenko | Ukraine | 1:10 | 30:38.8 | +2:08.9 |
| 21 | 23 | Yelena Sinkevitch | Belarus | 1:13 | 30:42.5 | +2:12.6 |
| 22 | 14 | Sylvia Honegger | Switzerland | 0:52 | 30:44.3 | +2:14.4 |
| 23 | 21 | Manuela Di Centa | Italy | 1:11 | 30:47.1 | +2:17.2 |
| 24 | 22 | Kateřina Hanušová | Czech Republic | 1:12 | 30:58.8 | +2:28.9 |
| 25 | 25 | Sumiko Yokoyama | Japan | 1:18 | 31:04.2 | +2:34.3 |
| 26 | 30 | Constanze Blum | Germany | 1:25 | 31:28.5 | +2:58.6 |
| 27 | 32 | Sophie Villeneuve | France | 1:28 | 31:31.5 | +3:01.6 |
| 28 | 36 | Karin Säterkvist | Sweden | 1:35 | 31:49.4 | +3:19.5 |
| 29 | 31 | Fumiko Aoki | Japan | 1:27 | 31:50.1 | +3:20.2 |
| 30 | 41 | Olena Hayasova | Ukraine | 1:41 | 31:51.9 | +3:22.0 |
| 31 | 37 | Anke Reschwamm Schulze | Germany | 1:37 | 31:53.4 | +3:23.5 |
| 32 | 26 | Kati Wilhelm | Germany | 1:19 | 31:54.0 | +3:24.1 |
| 33 | 52 | Karine Philippot | France | 2:01 | 32:00.3 | +3:30.4 |
| 34 | 34 | Nataša Lačen | Slovenia | 1:32 | 32:03.6 | +3:33.7 |
| 35 | 33 | Małgorzata Ruchała | Poland | 1:29 | 32:15.2 | +3:45.3 |
| 36 | 40 | Maryna Pestryakova | Ukraine | 1:40 | 32:18.7 | +3:48.8 |
| 37 | 49 | Annick Vaxelaire-Pierrel | France | 1:56 | 32:20.0 | +3:50.1 |
| 38 | 44 | Svetlana Deshevykh | Kazakhstan | 1:48 | 32:20.2 | +3:50.3 |
| 39 | 27 | Oxana Yatskaya | Kazakhstan | 1:20 | 32:20.5 | +3:50.6 |
| 40 | 58 | Alžbeta Havrančíková | Slovakia | 2:11 | 32:21.3 | +3:51.4 |
| 41 | 59 | Zuzana Kocumová | Czech Republic | 2:21 | 32:34.9 | +4:05.0 |
| 42 | 35 | Svetlana Shishkina | Kazakhstan | 1:33 | 32:39.4 | +4:09.5 |
| 43 | 39 | Bernadeta Piotrowska Pocek | Poland | 1:40 | 32:50.9 | +4:21.0 |
| 44 | 56 | Anita Nyman | Finland | 2:08 | 32:53.7 | +4:23.8 |
| 45 | 47 | Beckie Scott | Canada | 1:55 | 33:04.8 | +4:34.9 |
| 46 | 50 | Kumiko Yokoyama | Japan | 1:57 | 33:07.0 | +4:37.1 |
| 47 | 48 | Svetlana Kamotskaya | Belarus | 1:55 | 33:11.2 | +4:41.3 |
| 48 | 46 | Tomomi Otaka | Japan | 1:51 | 33:21.9 | +4:52.0 |
| 49 | 61 | Dorota Kwaśna | Poland | 2:26 | 33:38.6 | +5:08.7 |
| 50 | 53 | Cristel Vahtra | Estonia | 2:04 | 33:40.4 | +5:10.5 |
| 51 | 57 | Kati Pulkkinen | Finland | 2:11 | 33:43.5 | +5:13.6 |
| 52 | 51 | Kerrin Petty | United States | 1:59 | 34:12.2 | +5:42.3 |
| 53 | 70 | Irina Nikulchina | Bulgaria | 3:15 | 34:13.5 | +5:43.6 |
| 54 | 38 | Sigrid Wille | Germany | 1:38 | 34:15.1 | +5:45.2 |
| 55 | 55 | Irina Skripnik | Belarus | 2:07 | 34:15.8 | +5:45.9 |
| 56 | 54 | Milaine Thériault | Canada | 2:04 | 34:29.8 | +5:59.9 |
| 57 | 65 | Laura Wilson | United States | 2:47 | 34:42.4 | +6:12.5 |
| 58 | 63 | Ludmila Korolik | Belarus | 2:40 | 34:55.4 | +6:25.5 |
| 59 | 60 | Katarzyna Gębala | Poland | 2:21 | 35:04.3 | +6:34.4 |
| 60 | 69 | Monica Lăzăruț | Romania | 3:12 | 35:27.9 | +6:58.0 |
| 61 | 73 | Õnne Kurg | Estonia | 3:21 | 35:45.5 | +7:15.6 |
| 62 | 68 | Zhengrong Luan | China | 2:53 | 35:47.3 | +7:17.4 |
| 63 | 66 | Olga Selezneva | Kazakhstan | 2:50 | 36:00.6 | +7:30.7 |
| 64 | 74 | Sara Renner | Canada | 3:25 | 36:36.7 | +8:06.8 |
| 65 | 72 | Dongling Guo | China | 3:21 | 36:58.2 | +8:28.3 |
| 66 | 78 | Anžela Brice | Latvia | 4:02 | 37:07.5 | +8:37.6 |
| 67 | 71 | Ināra Rudko | Latvia | 3:19 | 37:20.3 | +8:50.4 |
| 68 | 76 | Kazimiera Strolienė | Lithuania | 3:40 | 38:44.3 | +10:14.4 |
| DNF | 75 | Laura McCabe | United States | 3:29 | Did not finish | |
| DNS | 17 | Tuulikki Pyykkönen | Finland | 1:05 | Did not start | |
| DNS | 28 | Jana Šaldová | Czech Republic | 1:23 | Did not start | |
| DNS | 42 | Renate Roider | Austria | 1:41 | Did not start | |
| DNS | 43 | Elin Ek | Sweden | 1:42 | Did not start | |
| DNS | 45 | Andrea Huber | Switzerland | 1:50 | Did not start | |
| DNS | 62 | Andrea Senteler | Switzerland | 2:30 | Did not start | |
| DNS | 64 | Anne-Laure Mignerey Condevaux | France | 2:44 | Did not start | |
| DNS | 67 | Nina Kemppel | United States | 2:52 | Did not start | |
| DNS | 77 | Jaime Fortier | Canada | 3:43 | Did not start | |
