= Cross-country skiing at the 1998 Winter Olympics – Men's 10 kilometre classical =

Men's 10 kilometre classical at the XVIII Olympic Winter Games
- Venue: Snow Harp
- Dates: 12 February 1998
- Competitors: 97 from 35 nations
- Winning time: 27:24.5

Medalists
1st place, gold medalist(s)		Bjørn Dæhlie	Norway
2nd place, silver medalist(s)		Markus Gandler	Austria
3rd place, bronze medalist(s)		Mika Myllylä	Finland

The men's 10 kilometre classical cross-country skiing competition at the 1998 Winter Olympics in Nagano, Japan, was held on 12 February at Snow Harp in Nozawa Onsen.

Each skier started at half a minute intervals, skiing the entire 10 kilometre course. Bjørn Dæhlie was the 1997 World champion. Dæhlie was also defending Olympic champion due to his win in 1994 Olympics in Lillehammer.

Bjørn Dæhlie won the race, and memorably insisted that the medals ceremony be delayed as he waited at the finish line to greet the final athlete to complete the race, Philip Boit of Kenya, who was the first Kenyan to compete in a Winter Olympics.

== Results ==
Rank	Bib	Name	Country	Time	Deficit
1st place, gold medalist(s)	45	Bjørn Dæhlie	Norway	27:24.5	
2nd place, silver medalist(s)	53	Markus Gandler	Austria	27:32.5	+8.0
3rd place, bronze medalist(s)	39	Mika Myllylä	Finland	27:40.1	+15.6
4	47	Vladimir Smirnov	Kazakhstan	27:45.1	+20.6
5	43	Thomas Alsgaard	Norway	27:48.1	+23.6
6	56	Jaak Mae	Estonia	27:56.0	+31.5
7	33	Erling Jevne	Norway	27:58.7	+34.2
8	57	Andrus Veerpalu	Estonia	28:00.7	+36.2
9	38	Sture Sivertsen	Norway	28:10.6	+46.1
10	46	Silvio Fauner	Italy	28:15.5	+51.0
11	37	Fulvio Valbusa	Italy	28:17.0	+52.5
12	41	Alois Stadlober	Austria	28:21.2	+56.7
13	67	Harri Kirvesniemi	Finland	28:22.5	+58.0
14	82	Gerhard Urain	Austria	28:25.2	+1:00.7
15	36	Jari Isometsä	Finland	28:36.7	+1:12.2
16	24	Andreas Schlütter	Germany	28:48.0	+1:23.5
17	59	Beat Koch	Switzerland	28:49.6	+1:25.1
18	92	Sami Repo	Finland	28:51.3	+1:26.8
19	85	Hiroyuki Imai	Japan	28:51.5	+1:51.5
20	55	Markus Hasler	Liechtenstein	28:55.2	+1:30.7
20	54	Patrick Remy	France	28:55.2	+1:30.7
22	66	Sergey Tchepikov	Russia	28:55.9	+1:31.4
23	30	Achim Walcher	Austria	28:58.6	+1:34.1
24	11	Vincent Vittoz	France	29:03.5	+1:39.0
25	31	Niklas Jonsson	Sweden	29:04.9	+1:40.4
26	20	Marco Albarello	Italy	29:10.1	+1:45.6
27	35	Johann Mühlegg	Germany	29:12.3	+1:47.8
28	44	Fabio Maj	Italy	29:13.8	+1:49.3
29	28	Masaaki Kozu	Japan	29:23.1	+1:58.6
30	15	Ricardas Panavas	Lithuania	29:24.1	+1:59.6
31	40	Alexey Prokourorov	Russia	29:27.3	+2:02.8
32	93	Petr Michl	Czech Republic	29:28.5	+2:04.0
33	61	Juan Jesús Gutiérrez	Spain	29:29.0	+2:04.5
34	71	Katsuhito Ebisawa	Japan	29:30.0	+2:05.5
35	64	Martin Koukal	Czech Republic	29:41.8	+2:17.3
36	49	Mitsuo Horigome	Japan	29:44.8	+2:20.3
37	76	Raul Olle	Estonia	29:52.3	+2:27.8
38	77	René Sommerfeldt	Germany	29:52.5	+2:28.0
39	73	Alexander Sannikov	Belarus	29:54.7	+2:30.2
40	74	Jochen Behle	Germany	29:55.9	+2:31.4
41	69	John Bauer	United States	29:58.4	+2:33.9
42	78	Sergey Kriyanin	Russia	30:03.2	+2:38.7
43	81	Patrick Weaver	United States	30:04.4	+2:39.9
44	65	Vladislavas Zybailo	Lithuania	30:09.9	+2:45.4
45	25	Lukáš Bauer	Czech Republic	30:11.1	+2:46.6
46	7	Michael Binzer	Denmark	30:14.2	+2:49.7
47	1	Justin Wadsworth	United States	30:26.3	+3:01.8
48	50	Robin McKeever	Canada	30:32.2	+3:07.7
49	14	Jeremias Wigger	Switzerland	30:33.4	+3:08.9
50	68	Pavel Riabinine	Kazakhstan	30:37.0	+3:12.5
51	70	Chris Blanchard	Canada	30:37.1	+3:12.6
52	32	Lubos Buchta	Czech Republic	30:38.4	+3:13.9
53	13	Park Byung-chul	South Korea	30:42.1	+3:17.6
54	58	Jordi Ribo	Spain	30:45.0	+3:20.5
55	87	Nikolay Popovich	Ukraine	30:51.2	+3:26.7
56	34	Henrik Forsberg	Sweden	30:55.7	+3:31.2
57	12	Stephan Kunz	Liechtenstein	30:56.8	+3:32.3
58	9	Elmo Kassin	Estonia	30:57.8	+3:33.3
59	83	Philippe Sanchez	France	31:03.5	+3:39.0
60	22	Gennadiy Nikon	Ukraine	31:07.6	+3:43.1
60	48	Ivan Bátory	Slovakia	31:07.6	+3:43.1
62	17	Vladimir Legotine	Russia	31:10.3	+3:45.8
63	3	Wilhelm Aschwanden	Switzerland	31:10.5	+3:46.0
64	8	Stanislav Jezik	Slovakia	31:11.2	+3:46.7
65	51	Janis Hermanis	Latvia	31:12.1	+3:47.6
66	4	Anthony Evans	Australia	31:12.7	+3:48.2
67	60	Martin Bajcicak	Slovakia	31:29.0	+4:04.5
68	10	Andrei Nevzorov	Kazakhstan	31:30.4	+4:05.9
69	16	Zsolt Antal	Romania	31:41.0	+4:16.5
70	19	Aleksey Tregubov	Belarus	31:43.9	+4:19.4
71	18	Guido Visser	Canada	31:50.8	+4:26.3
72	29	Mikhailo Artyukhov	Ukraine	31:52.8	+4:28.3
73	89	Nikolay Semeniako	Belarus	31:54.5	+4:30.0
74	63	Ahn Jin-soo	South Korea	31:55.5	+4:31.0
75	75	Yves Bilodeau	Canada	31:56.9	+4:32.4
76	62	Janusz Krezolok	Poland	32:02.8	+4:38.3
77	90	Juris Germanis	Latvia	32:05.8	+4:41.3
78	2	Marcus Nash	United States	32:11.9	+4:47.4
79	88	Park Byeong-ju	South Korea	32:46.1	+5:21.6
80	91	Vitaly Lilichenko	Kazakhstan	32:54.5	+5:30.0
81	52	Wu Jintao	China	32:57.7	+5:33.2
82	79	Alvaro Gijon	Spain	33:02.7	+5:38.2
83	26	Roberts Raimo	Latvia	33:09.9	+5:45.4
84	5	Slavtscho Batinkov	Bulgaria	33:23.2	+5:58.7
85	86	Ivan Hudač	Slovakia	33:41.9	+6:17.4
86	95	Lefteris Fafalis	Greece	34:13.7	+6:49.2
87	21	Diego Ruiz	Spain	34:17.3	+6:52.8
88	80	Paul Gray	Australia	34:45.1	+7:20.6
89	96	Balazs Latrompette	Hungary	35:30.9	+8:06.4
90	98	Dashzevegiin Ochirsükh	Mongolia	39:38.6	+12:14.1
91	94	Gjoko Dineski	Macedonia	39:39.3	+12:14.8
92	97	Philip Boit	Kenya	47:25.5	+20:01.0
	6	Antonio Racki	Croatia	Did not finish	
	23	Qu Donghai	China	Did not finish	
	27	Sergei Dolidovich	Belarus	Did not finish	
	72	Oleksandr Zarovniy	Ukraine	Did not finish	
	84	Patrick Mächler	Switzerland	Did not finish	
	42	Torgny Mogren	Sweden	Did not start	
