= Cross-country skiing at the 1998 Winter Olympics – Women's 5 kilometre classical =

Women's 5 kilometre classical at the XVIII Olympic Winter Games
- Venue: Snow Harp
- Dates: 10 February 1998
- Competitors: 79 from 26 nations
- Winning time: 17:37.9

Medalists
1st place, gold medalist(s)		Larisa Lazutina	Russia
2nd place, silver medalist(s)		Kateřina Neumannová	Czech Republic
3rd place, bronze medalist(s)		Bente Martinsen	Norway

The women's 5 kilometre classical cross-country skiing competition at the 1998 Winter Olympics in Nagano, Japan, was held on 10 February at Snow Harp. Each skier started at half-minute intervals, skiing the entire 5 kilometre course. The defending Olympic champion was the Russian Lyubov Yegorova, who won in Lillehammer.

== Results ==
Rank	Bib	Name	Country	Time	Deficit
1st place, gold medalist(s)	62	Larisa Lazutina	Russia	17:37.9	
2nd place, silver medalist(s)	72	Kateřina Neumannová	Czech Republic	17:42.7	+4.8
3rd place, bronze medalist(s)	58	Bente Martinsen	Norway	17:49.4	+11.5
4	76	Nina Gavrylyuk	Russia	17:50.3	+12.4
5	63	Olga Danilova	Russia	17:51.3	+13.4
6	61	Marit Mikkelsplass	Norway	17:53.5	+15.6
7	75	Anita Moen	Norway	18:04.4	+26.5
8	78	Trude Dybendahl Hartz	Norway	18:08.0	+30.1
9	59	Gabriella Paruzzi	Italy	18:14.7	+36.8
10	56	Brigitte Albrecht	Switzerland	18:16.5	+38.6
11	74	Iryna Terelya	Ukraine	18:17.2	+39.3
12	57	Stefania Belmondo	Italy	18:19.8	+41.9
13	73	Yuliya Chepalova	Russia	18:20.0	+42.1
14	71	Sylvia Honegger	Switzerland	18:29.6	+51.7
15	69	Maria Theurl	Austria	18:36.8	+58.9
16	50	Jaroslava Bukvajova	Slovakia	18:39.7	+1:01.8
17	36	Tuulikki Pyykkönen	Finland	18:42.8	+1:04.9
18	60	Satu Salonen	Finland	18:43.4	+1:05.5
19	65	Valentyna Shevchenko	Ukraine	18:47.5	+1:09.6
20	49	Katrin Šmigun	Estonia	18:48.7	+1:10.8
21	77	Manuela Di Centa	Italy	18:48.9	+1:11.0
22	45	Kateřina Hanušová	Czech Republic	18:49.1	+1:11.2
23	32	Yelena Sinkevitch	Belarus	18:50.2	+1:12.3
24	66	Antonina Ordina	Sweden	18:50.7	+1:12.8
25	38	Sumiko Yokoyama	Japan	18:55.1	+1:17.2
26	17	Kati Wilhelm	Germany	18:56.9	+1:19.0
27	37	Oxana Yatskaya	Kazakhstan	18:57.3	+1:19.4
28	27	Jana Šaldová	Czech Republic	19:00.4	+1:22.5
29	68	Sabina Valbusa	Italy	19:00.6	+1:22.7
30	42	Constanze Blum	Germany	19:02.4	+1:24.5
31	51	Fumiko Aoki	Japan	19:04.8	+1:26.9
32	67	Sophie Villeneuve	France	19:05.5	+1:27.6
33	33	Małgorzata Ruchała	Poland	19:06.4	+1:28.5
34	52	Natasa Lacen	Slovenia	19:09.3	+1:31.4
35	30	Svetlana Shishkina	Kazakhstan	19:10.7	+1:32.8
36	16	Karin Säterkvist	Sweden	19:12.9	+1:35.0
37	9	Anke Reschwamm Schulze	Germany	19:14.7	+1:36.8
38	41	Sigrid Wille	Germany	19:15.6	+1:37.7
39	53	Bernadeta Piotrowska	Poland	19:17.3	+1:39.4
40	22	Maryna Pestryakova	Ukraine	19:17.6	+1:39.7
41	39	Olena Hayasova	Ukraine	19:18.2	+1:40.3
42	70	Renate Roider	Austria	19:18.3	+1:40.4
43	48	Elin Ek	Sweden	19:19.2	+1:41.3
44	43	Svetlana Deshevykh	Kazakhstan	19:25.3	+1:47.4
45	40	Andrea Huber	Switzerland	19:27.6	+1:49.7
46	8	Tomomi Otaka	Japan	19:28.8	+1:50.9
47	64	Beckie Scott	Canada	19:32.6	+1:54.7
48	34	Svetlana Kamotskaya	Belarus	19:32.7	+1:54.8
49	46	Annick Vaxelaire-Pierrel	France	19:33.4	+1:55.5
50	26	Kumiko Yokoyama	Japan	19:34.5	+1:56.6
51	55	Kerrin Petty	United States	19:36.6	+1:58.7
52	18	Karine Philippot	France	19:38.6	+2:00.7
53	5	Cristel Vahtra	Estonia	19:41.4	+2:03.5
54	44	Milaine Theriault	Canada	19:41.8	+2:03.9
55	6	Irina Skripnik	Belarus	19:44.2	+2:06.3
56	7	Anita Hakala	Finland	19:45.0	+2:07.1
57	29	Kati Pulkkinen	Finland	19:48.0	+2:10.1
58	25	Alžbeta Havrančíková	Slovakia	19:48.5	+2:10.6
59	3	Zuzana Kocumová	Czech Republic	19:58.3	+2:20.4
60	15	Katarzyna Gębala	Poland	19:58.8	+2:20.9
61	11	Dorota Kwaśna	Poland	20:03.1	+2:25.2
62	14	Andrea Senteler	Switzerland	20:07.5	+2:29.6
63	21	Lyudmila Korolik	Belarus	20:17.9	+2:40.0
64	12	Anne-Laure Condevaux	France	20:21.2	+2:43.3
65	23	Laura Wilson	United States	20:24.6	+2:46.7
66	2	Olga Seleznyova	Kazakhstan	20:27.7	+2:49.8
67	35	Nina Kemppel	United States	20:29.7	+2:51.8
68	19	Luan Zhengrong	China	20:30.0	+2:52.1
69	31	Monica Lăzăruț	Romania	20:49.5	+3:11.6
70	47	Irina Nikulchina	Bulgaria	20:52.6	+3:14.7
71	13	Ināra Rudko	Latvia	20:56.1	+3:18.2
72	54	Guo Dongling	China	20:58.0	+3:20.1
73	20	Õnne Kurg	Estonia	20:58.7	+3:20.8
74	28	Sara Renner	Canada	21:02.4	+3:24.5
75	10	Laura McCabe	United States	21:06.9	+3:29.0
76	24	Kazimiera Strolienė	Lithuania	21:17.5	+3:39.6
77	1	Jaime Fortier	Canada	21:20.8	+3:42.9
78	4	Anzela Brice	Latvia	21:39.2	+4:01.3
79	79	Katerina Anastasiou	Greece	23:15.8	+5:37.9
