= Marie-Odile Raymond =

Canadian cross-country skier

Marie-Odile Raymond (born 13 December 1973) is a Canadian former cross-country skier who competed in the 1998 Winter Olympics.

== Cross-country skiing results ==
All results are sourced from the International Ski Federation (FIS).

=== Olympic Games ===
Year	Age	5 km	15 km	Pursuit	30 km	4 × 5 km relay
1998	24	—	62	—	56	—
