= Cross-country skiing at the 1998 Winter Olympics – Women's 30 kilometre freestyle =

Women's 30 kilometre freestyle at the XVIII Olympic Winter Games
- Venue: Snow Harp
- Dates: 20 February 1998
- Competitors: 68 from 25 nations
- Winning time: 1:22:01.5

Medalists
1st place, gold medalist(s)		Yuliya Chepalova; Russia
2nd place, silver medalist(s)		Stefania Belmondo; Italy
3rd place, bronze medalist(s)		Larisa Lazutina; Russia

The women's 30 kilometre freestyle cross-country skiing competition at the 1998 Winter Olympics in Nagano, Japan, was held on 20 February at Snow Harp.

Each skier started at half a minute intervals, skiing the entire 30 kilometre course. The defending Olympic champion was the Italian Manuela Di Centa, who won in Lillehammer, then in classical technique.

== Results ==
Rank	Bib	Name	Country	Time	Deficit
1st place, gold medalist(s)	28	Yuliya Chepalova	Russia	1:22:01.5	—
2nd place, silver medalist(s)	34	Stefania Belmondo	Italy	1:22:11.7	+10.2
3rd place, bronze medalist(s)	38	Larisa Lazutina	Russia	1:23:15.7	+1:14.2
4	40	Elin Nilsen	Norway	1:24:24.5	+2:23.0
5	26	Yelena Välbe	Russia	1:24:52.8	+2:51.3
6	35	Maria Theurl	Austria	1:24:54.3	+2:52.8
7	31	Brigitte Albrecht	Switzerland	1:25:15.0	+3:13.5
8	25	Iryna Terelya	Ukraine	1:25:22.3	+3:20.8
9	37	Marit Mikkelsplass	Norway	1:25:36.9	+3:35.4
10	32	Gabriella Paruzzi	Italy	1:26:06.0	+4:04.5
11	29	Antonina Ordina	Sweden	1:26:13.8	+4:12.3
12	7	Yelena Sinkevitch	Belarus	1:27:15.3	+5:13.8
13	30	Olga Danilova	Russia	1:28:08.1	+6:06.6
14	23	Valentyna Shevchenko	Ukraine	1:28:20.0	+6:18.5
15	44	Jaroslava Bukvajová	Slovakia	1:28:21.0	+6:19.5
16	8	Kati Wilhelm	Germany	1:28:27.7	+6:26.2
17	27	Sophie Villeneuve	France	1:28:57.8	+6:56.3
18	20	Nataša Lačen	Slovenia	1:29:10.4	+7:08.9
19	24	Maj Helen Sorkmo	Norway	1:29:16.9	+7:15.4
20	4	Antonella Confortola	Italy	1:29:31.6	+7:30.1
21	6	Svetlana Deshevykh	Kazakhstan	1:29:48.1	+7:46.6
22	14	Karine Philippot	France	1:29:51.6	+7:50.1
23	22	Kateřina Hanusová	Czech Republic	1:29:59.9	+7:58.4
24	17	Natascia Leonardi	Switzerland	1:30:31.8	+8:30.3
25	3	Alžbeta Havrančíková	Slovakia	1:30:38.6	+8:37.1
26	9	Anke Reschwamm Schulze	Germany	1:30:54.6	+8:53.1
27	1	Olena Hayasova	Ukraine	1:31:01.0	+8:59.5
28	11	Irina Nikulchina	Bulgaria	1:31:04.7	+9:03.2
29	19	Cristel Vahtra	Estonia	1:31:09.3	+9:07.8
30	56	Svetlana Shishkina	Kazakhstan	1:31:39.7	+9:38.2
31	59	Constanze Blum	Germany	1:31:52.9	+9:51.4
32	43	Sumiko Yokoyama	Japan	1:32:04.3	+10:02.8
33	16	Bernadeta Piotrowska	Poland	1:32:37.6	+10:36.1
34	12	Monica Lăzăruț	Romania	1:32:41.7	+10:40.2
35	49	Zuzana Kocumová	Czech Republic	1:32:52.1	+10:50.6
36	46	Laura Wilson	United States	1:33:10.6	+11:09.1
37	57	Anette Fanqvist	Sweden	1:33:10.7	+11:09.2
38	53	Midori Furusawa	Japan	1:33:16.2	+11:14.7
39	10	Kumiko Yokoyama	Japan	1:33:19.7	+11:18.2
40	13	Oxana Yatskaya	Kazakhstan	1:33:23.4	+11:21.9
41	48	Kerrin Petty	United States	1:33:47.3	+11:45.8
42	5	Svetlana Kamotskaya	Belarus	1:33:51.6	+11:50.1
43	2	Suzanne King	United States	1:34:01.8	+12:00.3
44	67	Ludmila Korolik	Belarus	1:34:07.5	+12:06.0
45	18	Karin Säterkvist	Sweden	1:34:15.1	+12:13.6
46	33	Kristina Šmigun	Estonia	1:34:18.1	+12:16.6
47	50	Irina Skripnik	Belarus	1:34:38.4	+12:36.9
48	52	Õnne Kurg	Estonia	1:34:59.9	+12:58.4
49	65	Laura McCabe	United States	1:35:09.9	+13:08.4
50	64	Milla Jauho	Finland	1:35:39.2	+13:45.9
51	39	Beckie Scott	Canada	1:35:47.4	+13:45.9
52	60	Olga Selezneva	Kazakhstan	1:36:30.6	+14:29.1
53	45	Anžela Brice	Latvia	1:37:08.4	+15:06.9
54	21	Sara Renner	Canada	1:40:14.6	+18:13.1
55	47	Kazimiera Strolienė	Lithuania	1:40:57.9	+18:56.4
56	54	Marie-Odile Raymond	Canada	1:41:07.2	+19:05.7
57	63	Ināra Rudko	Latvia	1:43:22.8	+21:21.3
58	68	Alla Mikayelyan	Armenia	1:44:03.6	+22:02.1
DNF	36	Trude Dybendahl Hartz	Norway	—	—
DNF	42	Karin Moroder	Italy	—	—
DNF	55	Dorota Kwaśna	Poland	—	—
DNF	58	Hanna Slipenko	Ukraine	—	—
DNF	62	Manuela Henkel	Germany	—	—
DNS	15	Anita Nyman	Finland	—	—
DNS	41	Annick Pierrel	France	—	—
DNS	51	Kati Sundqvist	Finland	—	—
DNS	61	Jaime Fortier	Canada	—	—
DNS	66	Tomomi Otaka	Japan	—	—
