= Andrea Senteler =

Swiss cross-country skier

Personal information
- Nationality: Switzerland
- Born: 28 April 1977 (age 49) Davos, Switzerland

Sport
- Sport: Skiing
- Club: SC Klosters

World Cup career
- Seasons: 6 – (1998–2003)
- Indiv. starts: 47
- Indiv. podiums: 0
- Team starts: 9
- Team podiums: 0
- Overall titles: 0 – (62nd in 2000, 2003)
- Discipline titles: 0

Andrea Senteler (born 28 April 1977) is a Swiss former cross-country skier. She competed in the women's 5 kilometre classical at the 1998 Winter Olympics.

== Cross-country skiing results ==
All results are sourced from the International Ski Federation (FIS).

=== Olympic Games ===
Year	Age	5 km	15 km	Pursuit	30 km	4 × 5 km relay
1998	20	62	—	DNS	—	—

=== World Championships ===
Year	Age	5 km	10 km	15 km	Pursuit	30 km	Sprint	4 × 5 km relay
1999	21	61	—N/a	30	40	25	—N/a	—
2003	25	—N/a	—	—	DNS	—	35	—

=== World Cup ===
==== Season standings ====
Season	Age				
Season	Age	Overall	Long Distance	Middle Distance	Sprint
1998	20	NC	NC	—N/a	—
1999	21	71	NC	—N/a	45
2000	22	62	NC	NC	43
2001	23	NC	—N/a	—N/a	NC
2002	24	NC	—N/a	—N/a	—
2003	25	62	—N/a	—N/a	39
