= Õnne Kurg =

Estonian cross-country skier

Personal information
- Nationality: Estonia
- Born: 8 March 1973 (age 53) Rakke, Estonia

Sport
- Sport: Skiing
- Club: Tamsalu AO Suusaklubi

World Cup career
- Seasons: 6 – (1997–2000, 2005–2006)
- Indiv. starts: 17
- Indiv. podiums: 0
- Team starts: 6
- Team podiums: 0
- Overall titles: 0 – (126th in 2006)
- Discipline titles: 0

Õnne Kurg (born 8 March 1973) is an Estonian cross-country skier. She competed in four events at the 1998 Winter Olympics.

== Cross-country skiing results ==
All results are sourced from the International Ski Federation (FIS).

=== Olympic Games ===
Year	Age	5 km	15 km	Pursuit	30 km	4 × 5 km relay
1998	24	73	40	61	48	—

=== World Championships ===
Year	Age	5 km	15 km	Pursuit	30 km	4 × 5 km relay
1997	23	67	—	DNF	49	—
1999	25	55	—	47	—	10

=== World Cup ===
==== Season standings ====
Season	Age					
Season	Age	Overall	Distance	Long Distance	Middle Distance	Sprint
1997	23	NC	—N/a	NC	—N/a	—
1998	24	NC	—N/a	NC	—N/a	—
1999	25	NC	—N/a	NC	—N/a	—
2000	26	NC	—N/a	—	NC	—
2005	31	NC	NC	—N/a	—N/a	—
2006	32	126	94	—N/a	—N/a	—
