= Cross-country skiing at the 1998 Winter Olympics – Women's 4 × 5 kilometre relay =

Women's 4 × 5 kilometre relay at the XVIII Olympic Winter Games
- Venue: Snow Harp
- Dates: 16 February 1998
- Competitors: 64 (16 teams) from 16 nations
- Winning time: 55:13.5

Medalists
1st place, gold medalist(s)		Nina Gavrylyuk; Olga Danilova; Yelena Välbe; Larisa Lazutina; Russia
2nd place, silver medalist(s)		Bente Martinsen; Marit Mikkelsplass; Elin Nilsen; Anita Moen-Guidon; Norway
3rd place, bronze medalist(s)		Karin Moroder; Gabriella Paruzzi; Manuela Di Centa; Stefania Belmondo; Italy

The women's 4 × 5 kilometre relay cross-country skiing competition at the 1998 Winter Olympics in Nagano, Japan, was held on 16 February at Snow Harp.

== Race summary ==
Russia had won the last three World Championships, and the 1994 Olympic gold medal, which had been won in 1992 by the Unified Team, and 1988 by the Soviet Union.

Russia and Norway started out quickly, with Nina Gavrylyuk leading over Bente Martinsen, who had a 17.7 lead over third-place Sweden. On the second leg, Norway moved ahead, one second in front of Russia, with Italy back in 12th place. Yelena Välbe, skiing the third leg for Russia, created a gap, and put Russia in front of Norway by 22.8 seconds at the final exchange, with Switzerland another minute behind. Manuela Di Centa skied well for Italy on the third leg but could only move her team up to ninth position. Välbe's split had made it an easy task for Russian anchor Larisa Lazutina, who increased the lead slightly as Russia won a comfortable gold medal over Norway. For Italy, the impossible occurred, as Stefania Belmondo's anchor leg was the fastest of the event, by over 26 seconds, and brought Italy in 1.9 seconds ahead of Switzerland. The podium had Russia, Norway, and Italy, in that order, exactly the same medal finish as in 1994.

== Results ==
Each team used four skiers, with each completing racing over the same 5 kilometre circuit. The first two raced in the classical style, and the final pair of skiers raced freestyle.

Rank	Bib	Team	Time	Deficit
1st place, gold medalist(s)	1	Russia; Nina Gavrylyuk; Olga Danilova; Yelena Välbe; Larisa Lazutina	55:13.5; 14:13.8; 13:53.2; 13:39.8; 13:26.7	—
2nd place, silver medalist(s)	2	Norway; Bente Martinsen; Marit Mikkelsplass; Elin Nilsen; Anita Moen-Guidon	55:38.0; 14:14.3; 13:51.7; 14:03.6; 13:28.4	+24.5
3rd place, bronze medalist(s)	4	Italy; Karin Moroder; Gabriella Paruzzi; Manuela Di Centa; Stefania Belmondo	56:53.3; 15:16.7; 14:35.7; 14:00.8; 13:00.1	+1:39.8
4	8	Switzerland; Sylvia Honegger; Andrea Huber; Brigitte Albrecht; Natascia Leonardi	56:55.2; 14:41.2; 14:43.6; 13:39.8; 13:50.6	+1:41.7
5	6	Germany; Kati Wilhelm; Manuela Henkel; Constanze Blum; Anke Reschwamm Schulze	56:55.4; 14:40.7; 14:17.9; 14:06.5; 13:50.3	+1:41.9
6	5	Czech Republic; Jana Saldová; Kateřina Neumannová; Kateřina Hanušová; Zuzana Kocumová	56:58.7; 14:58.3; 14:04.2; 14:10.2; 13:46.0	+1:45.2
7	3	Finland; Tuulikki Pyykkönen; Milla Jauho; Satu Salonen; Anita Nyman	57:34.3; 14:37.4; 14:44.6; 14:04.3; 14:08.0	+2:20.8
8	9	Sweden; Antonina Ordina; Anette Fanqvist; Magdalena Forsberg; Karin Säterkvist	57:53.7; 14:32.0; 14:44.8; 14:12.1; 14:24.8	+2:40.2
9	10	Ukraine; Valentyna Shevchenko; Iryna Terelya; Olena Hayasova; Maryna Pestryakova	57:54.8; 14:57.2; 13:53.1; 14:39.2; 14:25.3	+2:41.3
10	14	Japan; Tomomi Otaka; Sumiko Yokoyama; Fumiko Aoki; Kumiko Yokoyama	58:22.8; 14:40.3; 14:27.0; 14:46.9; 14:28.6	+3:09.3
11	7	France; Sophie Villeneuve; Annick Vaxelaire-Pierrel; Anne-Laure Mignerey Condevaux; Karine Philippot	58:27.7; 14:35.6; 14:48.5; 15:06.7; 13:56.9	+3:14.2
12	11	Kazakhstan; Svetlana Deshevykh; Oksana Yatskaya; Svetlana Shishkina; Olga Selezneva	59:11.3; 14:41.6; 14:36.0; 15:06.8; 14:46.9	+3:57.8
13	12	Poland; Katarzyna Gębala; Małgorzata Ruchała; Dorota Kwaśna; Bernadeta Piotrowska	59:56.7; 15:41.8; 15:00.8; 14:45.1; 14:29.0	+4:43.2
14	16	Belarus; Svetlana Kamotskaya; Ekaterina Antonuk; Yelena Sinkevitch; Ludmila Shablouskaya	59:56.9; 15:06.8; 15:19.7; 14:49.0; 14:41.4	+4:43.4
15	15	United States; Kerrin Petty; Suzanne King; Laura McCabe; Laura Wilson	1:00:51.2; 15:45.6; 15:33.5; 15:04.2; 14:27.9	+5:37.7
16	13	Canada; Beckie Scott; Milaine Thériault; Sara Renner; Jaime Fortier	1:01:09.9; 14:38.1; 15:14.7; 15:34.1; 15:43.0	+5:56.4
