= Anne-Laure Mignerey =

French cross-country skier (born 1973)

Personal information
- Nationality: France
- Born: 16 July 1973 (age 53) Ambilly, France

Sport
- Sport: Skiing

World Cup career
- Seasons: 4 – (1997–1999, 2007)
- Indiv. starts: 20
- Indiv. podiums: 0
- Team starts: 11
- Team podiums: 0
- Overall titles: 0 – (56th in 1998)
- Discipline titles: 0

Anne-Laure Mignerey (née Condevaux; born 16 July 1973) is a French cross-country skier. She competed in two events at the 1998 Winter Olympics.

== Cross-country skiing results ==
All results are sourced from the International Ski Federation (FIS).

=== Olympic Games ===
Year	Age	5 km	15 km	Pursuit	30 km	4 × 5 km relay
1998	24	64	—	DNS	—	11

=== World Championships ===
Year	Age	5 km	15 km	Pursuit	30 km	4 × 5 km relay
1997	23	53	37	DNF	—	7
1999	25	—	—	—	—	9

=== World Cup ===
==== Season standings ====
Season	Age	Discipline standings				Ski Tour standings
Season	Age	Overall	Distance	Long Distance	Sprint	Tour de Ski
1997	23	NC	—N/a	NC	NC	—N/a
1998	24	56	—N/a	NC	49	—N/a
1999	25	69	—N/a	NC	71	—N/a
2007	33	NC	NC	—N/a	—	—
