= Katarzyna Gębala =

Polish skier

Personal information
- Nationality: Poland
- Born: 4 September 1974 (age 51) Bielsko-Biała, Poland

Sport
- Sport: Skiing
- Club: AZS AWF Katowice

World Cup career
- Seasons: 4 – (1995–1998)
- Indiv. starts: 19
- Indiv. podiums: 0
- Team starts: 6
- Team podiums: 0
- Overall titles: 0
- Discipline titles: 0

Katarzyna Gębala (born 4 September 1974) is a Polish cross-country skier. She competed in three events at the 1998 Winter Olympics.

== Cross-country skiing results ==
All results are sourced from the International Ski Federation (FIS).

=== Olympic Games ===
| Year | Age | 5 km | 15 km | Pursuit | 30 km | 4 × 5 km relay |
|---|---|---|---|---|---|---|
| 1998 | 23 | 60 | — | 59 | — | 13 |

=== World Championships ===
| Year | Age | 5 km | 15 km | Pursuit | 30 km | 4 × 5 km relay |
|---|---|---|---|---|---|---|
| 1995 | 20 | 49 | — | 45 | 45 | — |
| 1997 | 22 | 63 | 52 | 53 | DNF | 13 |

=== World Cup ===
==== Season standings ====
| Season | Age | | | |
| Season | Age | Overall | Long Distance | Sprint |
|---|---|---|---|---|
| 1995 | 20 | NC | —N/a | —N/a |
| 1996 | 21 | NC | —N/a | —N/a |
| 1997 | 22 | NC | NC | — |
| 1998 | 23 | NC | NC | — |
