= Jana Šaldová =

Czech cross-country skier (born 1975)

Personal information
- Nationality: Czech Republic
- Born: 8 July 1975 (age 51) Jilemnice, Czechoslovakia

Sport
- Sport: Skiing

World Cup career
- Seasons: 6 – (1995–1998, 2000, 2002)
- Indiv. starts: 18
- Indiv. podiums: 0
- Team starts: 5
- Team podiums: 0
- Overall titles: 0 – (74th in 1997)
- Discipline titles: 0
Medal record
Women's cross-country skiing
Representing Czech Republic
Junior World Championships
Gold medal – first place	1994 Breitenwang	4 × 5 km relay
Silver medal – second place	1995 Gällivare	4 × 5 km relay

Jana Šaldová (born 8 July 1975) is a Czech cross-country skier who competed from 1994 to 2003. Competing at the 1998 Winter Olympics in Nagano, she finished sixth in the 4 × 5 km relay, 28th in the 5 km event, and 29th in the 15 km event.

Šaldová's best finish at the FIS Nordic World Ski Championships was 27th in the 5 km event at Trondheim in 1997. Her best World Cup finish was 33rd in a 5 km event in the Czech Republic in 2002.

Šaldová earned two individual career victories up to 15 km in the Czech Republic, both in 1998.

== Cross-country skiing results ==
All results are sourced from the International Ski Federation (FIS).

=== Olympic Games ===
Year	Age	5 km	15 km	Pursuit	30 km	4 × 5 km relay
1998	22	28	29	DNS	—	6

=== World Championships ===
Year	Age	5 km	10 km	15 km	Pursuit	30 km	Sprint	4 × 5 km relay
1995	19	36	—N/a	—	DNS	—	—N/a	8
1997	21	27	—N/a	—	DNF	33	—N/a	5
2001	25	—N/a	32	51	—	CNX^{[a]}	36	8

a. ^{1} Cancelled due to extremely cold weather.

=== World Cup ===
==== Season standings ====
Season	Age				
Season	Age	Overall	Long Distance	Middle Distance	Sprint
1995	19	NC	—N/a	—N/a	—N/a
1996	20	NC	—N/a	—N/a	—N/a
1997	21	74	74	—N/a	—
1998	22	NC	NC	—N/a	—
2000	24	NC	—	NC	—
2002	26	NC	—N/a	—N/a	—
