= Suzanne King =

American cross-country skier (born 1964)

Personal information
- Nationality: United States
- Born: May 12, 1964 (age 62) New Haven, Connecticut, United States

Sport
- Sport: Skiing

World Cup career
- Seasons: 3 – (1994–1995, 1997)
- Indiv. starts: 14
- Indiv. podiums: 0
- Team starts: 1
- Team podiums: 0
- Overall titles: 0
- Discipline titles: 0

Suzanne King (born May 12, 1964) is an American cross-country skier. She competed at the 1994 Winter Olympics in Lillehammer and the 1998 Winter Olympics in Nagano.

== Cross-country skiing results ==
All results are sourced from the International Ski Federation (FIS).

=== Olympic Games ===
Year	Age	5 km	15 km	Pursuit	30 km	4 × 5 km relay
1994	29	—	—	—	51	—
1998	33	—	48	—	43	15

=== World Championships ===
Year	Age	5 km	15 km	Pursuit	30 km	4 × 5 km relay
1995	30	56	46	55	44	10
1997	32	64	39	49	46	—

=== World Cup ===
==== Season standings ====
Season	Age			
Season	Age	Overall	Long Distance	Sprint
1994	29	NC	—N/a	—N/a
1995	30	NC	—N/a	—N/a
1997	32	NC	NC	—
