= 2023 NCAA Skiing Championships =

American college skiing competition

2023 NCAA Skiing tournament
- Teams: 22
- Format: Duration scoring
- Finals site: Wilmington and Lake Placid, New York
- Champions: Utah Utes (15th title)
- Runner-up: Colorado Buffaloes
- Semifinalists: Denver Pioneers; Vermont Catamounts
- Television: NCAA

The 2023 NCAA Skiing Championships took place from March 8 to March 11 in New York, at Mt. Van Hoevenberg, which hosted the cross-country events, and Whiteface Mountain, which hosted the alpine events. The tournament went into its 69th consecutive NCAA Skiing Championships, and featured twenty-two teams across all divisions.

== Team results ==
- Note: Top 10 only
- (H): Team from hosting U.S. state

Rank	Team	Points
1st place, gold medalist(s)	Utah	526
2nd place, silver medalist(s)	Colorado	491.5
3rd place, bronze medalist(s)	Denver	416.5
4	Vermont	343
5	Dartmouth	335.5
6	Montana State	280
7	Alaska Fairbanks	268
8	New Hampshire	234
9	Westminster	225
10	Middlebury	215

== Individual Results ==
- Note: Table does not include consolation
- (H): Individual from hosting U.S. State

Games	First	Second	Third
Women's giant slalom details	Madison Hoffman; Utah	Sara Rask (Colorado) Denver	Justine Lamontagne; Montana State
Women's giant slalom details	Madison Hoffman; Utah	Sara Rask (Colorado) Denver	Hannah Saethereng (Utah) Westminster
Women's 5K freestyle details	Novie McCabe; Utah	Jasmine Lyons; New Hampshire	Anna-Maria Dietze; Colorado
Women's 5K freestyle details	Novie McCabe; Utah	Jasmine Lyons; New Hampshire	Sophia Laukli; Utah
Women's slalom details	Madison Hoffman; Utah	Nora Brand (Colorado) Denver	Sara Rask (Colorado) Denver
Women's slalom details	Madison Hoffman; Utah	Nora Brand (Colorado) Denver	Ella Bromee; Alaska Anchorage
Women's 20K classic details	Novie McCabe; Utah	Hanna Abrahamsson; Colorado	Sophia Laukli; Utah
Women's 20K classic details	Novie McCabe; Utah	Hanna Abrahamsson; Colorado	Mariel Pulles; Alaska Fairbanks
Men's giant slalom details	Filip Forejtek; Colorado	Louis Fausa; Colorado	Riley Seger; Montana State
Men's giant slalom details	Filip Forejtek; Colorado	Louis Fausa; Colorado	Joachim Lindstol; Vermont
Men's 10K freestyle details	Joe Davies; Alaska Fairbanks	John Hagenbuch (New Hampshire) Dartmouth	Bernhard Flaschberger (Colorado) Denver
Men's 10K freestyle details	Joe Davies; Alaska Fairbanks	John Hagenbuch (New Hampshire) Dartmouth	Andreas Kirkeng (Colorado) Denver
Men's slalom details	Mathias Tefre; Vermont	Wilhelm Normannseth; Utah	Joachim Lindstol; Vermont
Men's slalom details	Mathias Tefre; Vermont	Wilhelm Normannseth; Utah	Mikkel Solbakken (Utah) Westminster
Men's 20K classic details	Remi Drolet (Massachusetts) Harvard	John Hagenbuch (New Hampshire) Dartmouth	Jacob Nystedt; Vermont
Men's 20K classic details	Remi Drolet (Massachusetts) Harvard	John Hagenbuch (New Hampshire) Dartmouth	Samuel Hendry; Utah
