= Isabelle Doucet =

Canadian speed skater

Personal information
- Born: 25 October 1973 (age 52) Sainte-Foy, Quebec, Canada

Sport
- Sport: Speed skating

Isabelle Doucet (born 25 October 1973) is a Canadian speed skater. She competed in the women's 1500 metres at the 1998 Winter Olympics.
