= Laura McCabe =

American cross-country skier (born 1966)

Personal information
- Born: March 8, 1966 (age 60) Bozeman, Montana, United States

Sport
- Sport: Skiing

World Cup career
- Seasons: 1 – (1994)
- Indiv. starts: 1
- Indiv. podiums: 0
- Team starts: 1
- Team podiums: 0
- Overall titles: 0

Laura McCabe (born March 8, 1966) is an American cross-country skier. She competed at the 1994 Winter Olympics and the 1998 Winter Olympics.

== Personal life ==
Laura's daughter, Novie, represented the United States at the 2022 Winter Olympics in the 10 kilometre classical.

== Cross-country skiing results ==
All results are sourced from the International Ski Federation (FIS).

=== Olympic Games ===
Year	Age	5 km	15 km	Pursuit	30 km	4 × 5 km relay
1994	28	—	34	—	—	10
1998	32	75	—	DNF	49	15

=== World Cup ===
==== Season standings ====
Season	Age	Overall
1994	28	NC
