= Kerrin Petty =

US-Swedish female cross-country skier

Personal information
- Born: 6 January 1970 Townsend, Vermont, United States

Sport
- Sport: Skiing
- Club: IFK Mora SK

World Cup career
- Seasons: 5 – (1994–1998)
- Indiv. starts: 30
- Indiv. podiums: 0
- Team starts: 3
- Team podiums: 0
- Overall titles: 0 – (77th in 1997)
- Discipline titles: 0

Kerrin Petty-Nilsson (born 6 January 1970 in Townshend, Vermont, United States), is an American-Swedish former cross-country skier. After competing on the cross-country ski team at the University of Vermont, she represented the United States during the 1994 Olympic Winter Games in Lillehammer, and in Nagano in 1998. Petty achieved success in Swedish ski races, winning the women's main competition of Vasaloppet in 1998 and the unofficial women's competitions in 1994 and 1996.

She also won the Swedish women's 30 km national championship in 1996 and Tjejvasan in 1996 and 1997.

After her athletic career, she has worked in environmental and health protection roles in Sweden, including as an inspector in Forshaga Municipality.

== Cross-country skiing results ==
All results are sourced from the International Ski Federation (FIS).

=== Olympic Games ===
Year	Age	5 km	15 km	Pursuit	30 km	4 × 5 km relay
1994	24	59	—	DNF	—	—
1998	28	51	47	52	41	15

=== World Championships ===
Year	Age	5 km	15 km	Pursuit	30 km	4 × 5 km relay
1995	25	64	39	DNS	33	10

=== World Cup ===
==== Season standings ====
Season	Age			
Season	Age	Overall	Long Distance	Sprint
1994	24	NC	—N/a	—N/a
1995	25	NC	—N/a	—N/a
1996	26	NC	—N/a	—N/a
1997	27	77		61
1998	28	NC	NC	NC
