= Laura Wilson (cross-country skier) =

American skier (born 1969)

Personal information
- Born: September 27, 1969 (age 56) Utica, New York, United States

Sport
- Sport: Skiing
- Club: Sun Valley Ski Club

World Cup career
- Seasons: 5 – (1992, 1994, 1996–1998)
- Indiv. starts: 17
- Indiv. podiums: 0
- Team starts: 3
- Team podiums: 0
- Overall titles: 0

Laura Wilson (born September 27, 1969) is an American cross-country skier. She competed at the 1994 Winter Olympics and the 1998 Winter Olympics.

Born in New York, but raised in Montpelier, Vermont, Wilson was a four-time First Team All-American at the University of Vermont and part of the Catamounts' 1990 NCAA Championship team. In 2015, she was inducted into the Vermont Sports Hall of Fame.

== Cross-country skiing results ==
All results are sourced from the International Ski Federation (FIS).

=== Olympic Games ===
Year	Age	5 km	15 km	Pursuit	30 km	4 × 5 km relay
1994	24	—	35	—	49	10
1998	28	65	53	57	36	15

=== World Championships ===
Year	Age	5 km	15 km	Pursuit	30 km	4 × 5 km relay
1997	27	55	44	43	DNF	—

=== World Cup ===
==== Season standings ====
Season	Age			
Season	Age	Overall	Long Distance	Sprint
1992	22	NC	—N/a	—N/a
1994	24	NC	—N/a	—N/a
1996	26	NC	—N/a	—N/a
1997	27	NC	NC	—
1998	28	NC	NC	—
