= Alexander Kravchenko (skier) =

Russian cross-country skier (born 1973)

Aleksandr Kravchenko
Personal information
- Nationality: Russian
- Born: 19 May 1973 (age 51); Katav-Ivanovsk, Russia

Sport
- Sport: Cross-country skiing

Aleksandr Kravchenko (born 19 May 1973) is a Russian cross-country skier. He competed in the men's 30 kilometre classical event at the 1998 Winter Olympics.
