= Becky Sundstrom =

American speed skater

Personal information
- Born: May 10, 1976 (age 49); Glen Ellyn, Illinois, United States

Sport
- Sport: Speed skating

Becky Sundstrom (born May 10, 1976) is an American speed skater. She competed at the 1998 Winter Olympics and the 2002 Winter Olympics. Her sisters Shana and Tama were also international speed skaters.
