= Sue Merz =

American ice hockey player (born 1972)

- Born: April 10, 1972 (age 54) Greenwich, Connecticut, U.S.
- Height: 5 ft 5 in (165 cm)
- Weight: 150 lb (68 kg; 10 st 10 lb)
- Position: Defense
- Shot: left
- ECAC team: New Hampshire Wildcats
- National team: United States
- Playing career: 1990–2002
Medal record
Representing United States
Women's ice hockey
Olympic Games
Gold medal – first place	1998 Nagano	Tournament
Silver medal – second place	2002 Salt Lake City	Tournament
IIHF World Women's Championships
Silver medal – second place	1990 Canada	Tournament
Silver medal – second place	1992 Finland	Tournament
Silver medal – second place	1994 United States	Tournament
Silver medal – second place	1999 Finland	Tournament
Silver medal – second place	2000 Canada	Tournament
Silver medal – second place	2001 United States	Tournament

Suzanne Rose Merz (born April 10, 1972) is an American ice hockey player. She won a gold medal at the 1998 Winter Olympics and a silver medal at the 2002 Winter Olympics.

== Early life and education ==
Merz was born April 10, 1972 in Greenwich, Connecticut, to André Merz, a Swiss-born hairdresser, and Rosly Katherine (died 1981). She has one brother, Jean-Claude Merz. She graduated from Greenwich High School and the University of New Hampshire through an ice hockey scholarship. In her hometown, Greenwich, Connecticut, Susan Merz Way is named in her honor.

== Personal life ==
Merz is married to Margaret Mullen-Merz (née Mullen). She is a Swiss-American dual citizen.

== Career statistics ==
=== International ===
Year	Team	Event	Result	GP	G	A	Pts	PIM
1990	USA	WC	2nd place, silver medalist(s)	5	-	-	-	-
