= Moira D'Andrea =

American speed skater (born 1968)

Personal information
- Full name: Moira D'Andrea-Marshall
- Nationality: American
- Born: March 4, 1968 (age 58) Saratoga Springs, New York, United States

Sport
- Sport: Speed skating

Moira D'Andrea (born March 4, 1968) is an American speed skater. She competed at the 1992 Winter Olympics and the 1998 Winter Olympics, with her career in speed skating spanning twelve years from 1986 to 1998. She later became the coach of the Canadian national speed skating team. In 2015, she was inducted into the United States Speed Skating Hall of Fame.

== Biography ==
D'Andrea was born in Saratoga Springs, New York in 1968. She made her debut on the Senior World Team at the age of 14, and she competed at the World Junior Speed Skating Championships in 1986. D'Andrea competed at seven editions of the World Speed Skating Championships, finishing on the podium twice during the mid-1990s. D'Andrea was involved in two car crashes during her career, one in 1991, and the second in 1996 when she was a cyclist.

At the 1992 Winter Olympics in Albertville, D'Andrea competed in the women's 1000 metres, where she finished in 32nd place. Six years later, she competed in three events at the 1998 Winter Olympics in Nagano, with a best finish of ninth, also in the women's 1000 metres.

Following her skating career, D'Andrea moved to Canada to become a coach. She attended the National Coaching Institute in Calgary, where she gained her coaching qualifications. She became the Female Coach of the Year, and went on to coach the Canadian national team for the 2002 Winter Olympics. D'Andrea was inducted into the United States Speed Skating Hall of Fame in 2015.

Her husband, Mike, was a former Canadian speed skater, and two of D'Andrea's brother-in-laws, Neal Marshall and Kevin Marshall, also competed for Canada in speed skating at the Winter Olympics.
