= Novie McCabe =

American cross-country skier (born 2001)

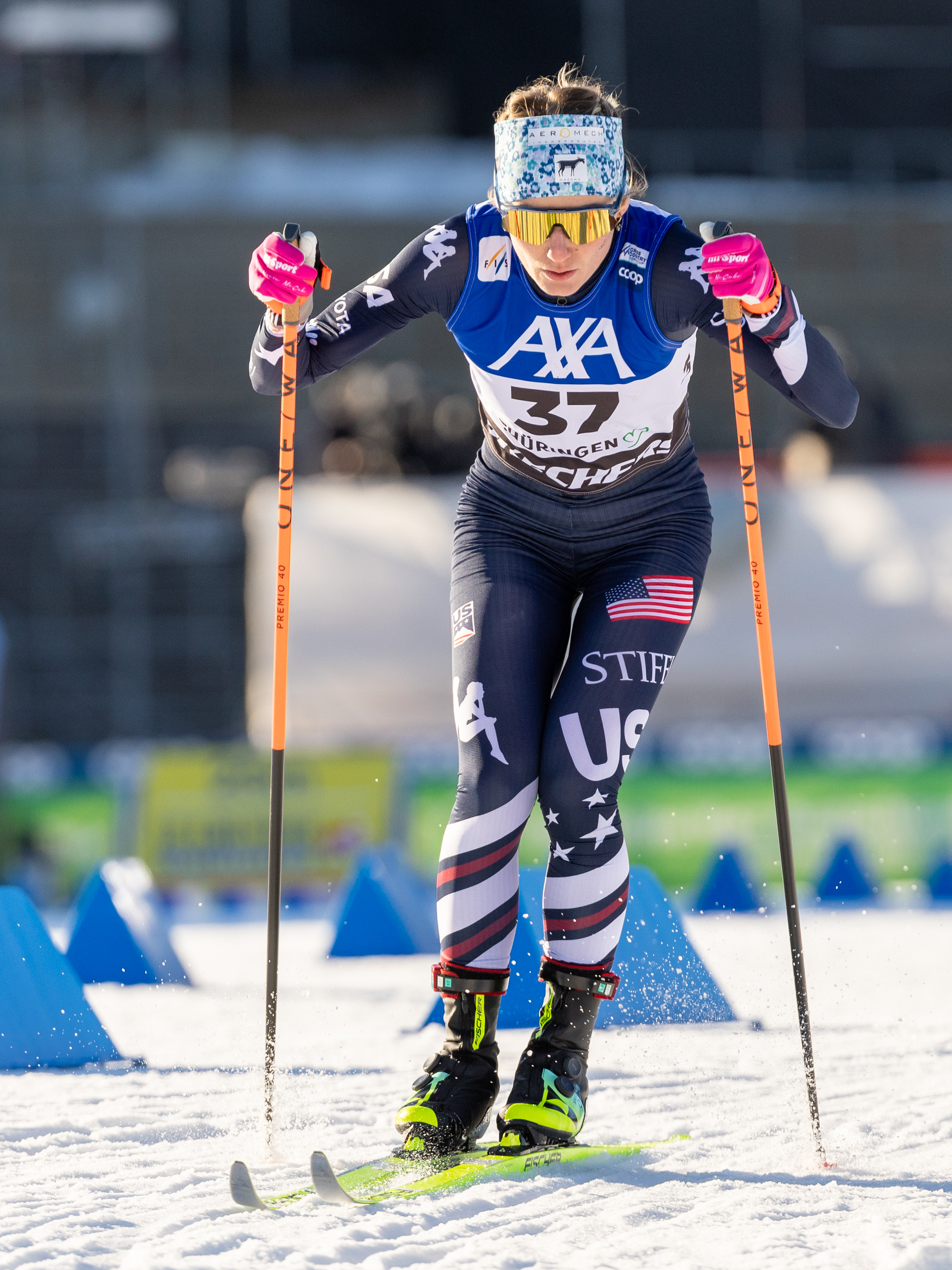

Personal information
- Nationality: United States
- Born: December 15, 2001 (age 24) Winthrop, Washington, U.S.

Sport
- Sport: Skiing
- Club: University of Utah Ski Team

World Cup career
- Seasons: 4 – (2022–present)
- Indiv. starts: 21
- Team starts: 2
Medal record
Women's cross-country skiing
Representing United States
Junior World Championships
Silver medal – second place	2020 Oberwiesenthal	4 × 3.33 km relay
- Updated on March 27, 2023

Novie McCabe (born December 15, 2001) is an American cross-country skier.

== Career ==
McCabe made her World Cup debut in November 2021, in Rukatunturi, Finland, finishing 61st in the classical sprint. Her best World Cup finish is seventh, in the 10 km mass start in Val di Fiemme, Italy, in January 2022.

She represented the United States at the 2022 Winter Olympics in Beijing, China. In January 2026, she was again selected to represent the United States at the 2026 Winter Olympics in Milan, Italy.

== Personal life ==
She is the daughter of former cross-country skier Laura McCabe.

Her idol growing up was Swedish cross-country skier Charlotte Kalla.

== Cross-country skiing results ==
All results are sourced from the International Ski Federation (FIS).

=== Olympic Games ===
Year	Age	Individual	Skiathlon	Mass start	Sprint	Relay	Team sprint
2022	20	24	—	18	—	6	—
2026	24	31	26	—	—	5	—

=== World Cup ===
==== Season standings ====
Season	Age	Discipline standings				Ski Tour standings
Season	Age	Overall	Distance	Sprint	U23	Tour de Ski
2022	20	58	45	NC	6	24
2023	21	73	49	97	10	—
