= Kristina Sabasteanski =

American biathlete (born 1969)

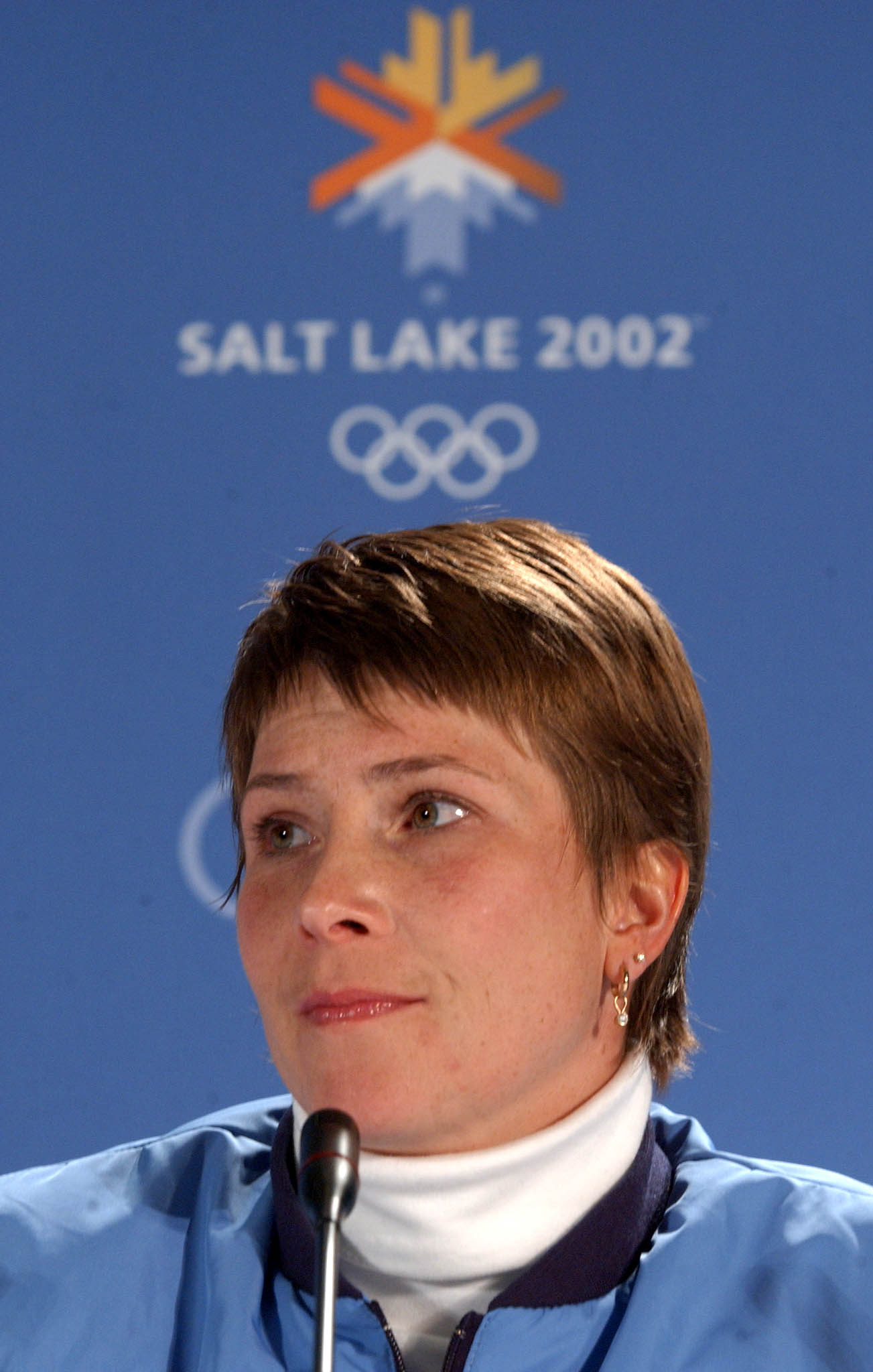
- Kristina Sabasteanski in 2002

Personal information
- Full name: Kristina Sabasteanski-Viljanen
- National team: United States
- Born: April 1, 1969 (age 56) Pittsfield, Massachusetts

Sport
- Country: America
- Sport: Biathlon

Kristina Sabasteanski-Viljanen (born in Pittsfield, Massachusetts on April 1, 1969) is a former instructor at the University of Southern Maine and a retired American biathlete who has competed in two Olympics.
