= Jason Rosener =

American alpine skier (born 1975)

Jason Rosener (born February 12, 1975 in Omaha, Nebraska) is an American retired alpine skier who competed in the 1998 Winter Olympics.
