= Stacey Wooley =

American biathlete (born 1968)

Personal information
- Nationality: American
- Born: April 21, 1968 (age 56); Lebanon, New Hampshire, United States
- Height: 162 cm (5 ft 4 in)
- Weight: 57 kg (126 lb)

Sport
- Sport: Biathlon
- Event(s): 7.5 kilometres sprint, 15 kilometres, 4 x 7.5 kilometres Relay

Stacey Wooley (born April 21, 1968) is an Dartmouth graduate and American biathlete. She competed in the three events at the 1998 Winter Olympics.

== Career ==
=== 1998 Winter Olympics ===
She competed in the three events at the 1998 Winter Olympics.

Games	Event	Team	Position
1998 Winter Olympics	Biathlon	USA	
1998 Winter Olympics	7.5 kilometres Sprint, Women	USA	58
1998 Winter Olympics	15 kilometres, Women	USA	55
1998 Winter Olympics	4 × 7.5 kilometres Relay, Women	USA	15

=== Later life ===
She later competed on the World Cup circuit from 1992 - 2002. After she finished competing in Germany, she worked as a lifestyle trainer at Oxygym Wellness in Traunstein from 2002 - 04.

In 2004 she moved back to Park City, Utah where she worked various jobs until becoming an associate director of high performance Paralympic winter sports for the US Olympic Committee. Wooley further went on to become the director of development for the US Ski and Snowboard Hall of Fame and Museum in Park City in 2014.
