= Roberts Raimo =

Latvian cross-country skier (born 1968)

Personal information
- Nationality: Latvian
- Born: 10 April 1968 (age 56); Riga, Latvia

Sport
- Sport: Cross-country skiing

Roberts Raimo (born 10 April 1968) is a Latvian cross-country skier. He competed in the men's 10 kilometre classical event at the 1998 Winter Olympics.
