= Dan Westover =

American biathlete (born 1974)

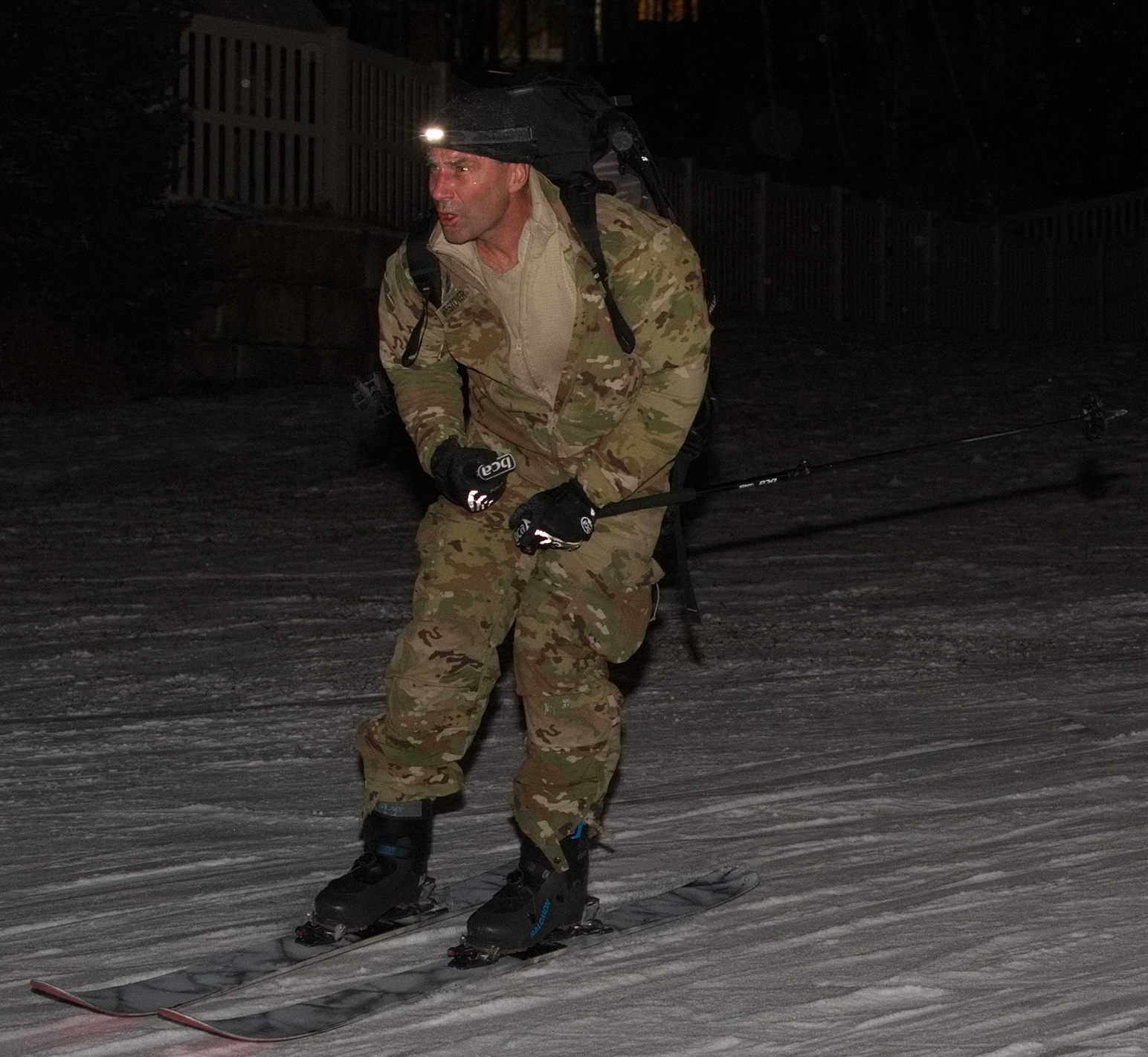
- Westover in 2023

Personal information
- Nationality: American
- Born: March 10, 1974 (age 52) Madagascar

Sport
- Sport: Biathlon

Dan Westover (born March 10, 1974) is an American biathlete. He competed in the men's sprint event at the 1998 Winter Olympics.

Westover was born in Madagascar where his father was working for Catholic Relief Services. He was the first African-born athlete to represent the United States at the Winter Olympics.
