= Cory Carpenter =

American speed skater

Personal information
- Born: August 30, 1976 (age 49) Kalamazoo, Michigan, United States

Sport
- Sport: Speed skating

Cory Carpenter (born August 30, 1976) is an American speed skater. He competed in three events at the 1998 Winter Olympics.
