= Robert Rosser =

American biathlete (born 1969)

Personal information
- Nationality: American
- Born: April 11, 1969 (age 57) Plattsburgh, New York, United States
- Education: Eastern Oregon University
- Height: 178 cm (5 ft 10 in)
- Weight: 75 kg (165 lb; 11 st 11 lb)

Sport
- Sport: Biathlon

Robert Rosser (born April 11, 1969) is an American biathlete. He competed in the men's 20 km individual event at the 1998 Winter Olympics.
