= Ināra Rudko =

Latvian cross-country skier (born 1975)

Personal information
- Nationality: Latvian
- Born: 21 July 1975 (age 49); Daugavpils, Latvia
- Height: 168 cm (5 ft 6 in)
- Weight: 54 kg (119 lb)

Sport
- Sport: Cross-country skiing

Ināra Rudko (born 21 July 1975) is a Latvian cross-country skier. She competed in four events at the 1998 Winter Olympics.
