= Mykhailo Artiukhov =

Ukrainian cross-country skier (born 1971)

Personal information
- Nationality: Ukrainian
- Born: 15 June 1971 (age 53); Kyiv, Ukraine

Sport
- Sport: Cross-country skiing

Mykhailo Artiukhov (born 15 June 1971) is a Ukrainian cross-country skier. He competed in the men's 10 kilometre classical event at the 1998 Winter Olympics.
