= Ivan Hudač =

Slovak cross-country skier (born 1971)

Personal information
- Nationality: Slovak
- Born: 10 August 1971 (age 53); Šuňava, Czechoslovakia

Sport
- Sport: Cross-country skiing

Ivan Hudač (born 10 August 1971) is a Slovak cross-country skier. He competed in the men's 10 kilometre classical event at the 1998 Winter Olympics.
