= Stanislav Ježík =

Slovak cross-country skier (born 1972)

Personal information
- Nationality: Slovak
- Born: 11 February 1972 (age 53); Dubnica nad Váhom, Czechoslovakia

Sport
- Sport: Cross-country skiing

Stanislav Ježík (born 11 February 1972) is a Slovak cross-country skier. He competed in the men's 10 kilometre classical event at the 1998 Winter Olympics.
