= Monica Lăzăruț =

Romanian cross-country skier (born 1977)

Personal information
- Nationality: Romanian
- Born: 13 July 1977 (age 47); Susenii Bârgăului, Romania

Sport
- Sport: Cross-country skiing

Monica Lăzăruț (born 13 July 1977) is a Romanian cross-country skier. She competed in four events at the 1998 Winter Olympics.
