= Guido Visser =

Canadian cross-country skier

Guido Visser (born 22 July 1970) is a Canadian former cross-country skier who competed in the 1998 Winter Olympics.
