= Wu Jintao =

Chinese cross-country skier

Personal information
- Nationality: Chinese
- Born: 6 January 1975 (age 50)

Sport
- Sport: Cross-country skiing

Wu Jintao (born 6 January 1975) is a Chinese cross-country skier. He competed at the 1992 Winter Olympics and the 1998 Winter Olympics.
