= Olena Hayasova =

Ukrainian cross-country skier (born 1969)

Personal information
- Nationality: Ukrainian
- Born: 10 May 1969 (age 57) Vologda, Soviet Union

Sport
- Sport: Cross-country skiing
Medal record
Women's cross-country skiing
Representing Ukraine
Winter Universiade
Gold medal – first place	1993 Zakopane	Relay

Olena Hayasova (born 10 May 1969) is a Ukrainian cross-country skier. She competed in five events at the 1998 Winter Olympics.
