= Aleksandr Sannikov =

Belarusian cross-country skier (born 1971)

Personal information
- Nationality: Belarusian
- Born: 12 July 1971 (age 53); Perm, Russia

Sport
- Sport: Cross-country skiing

Aleksandr Sannikov (born 12 July 1971) is a Belarusian cross-country skier. He competed at the 1998 Winter Olympics and the 2002 Winter Olympics.
