= Kumiko Yokoyama =

Japanese cross-country skier (born 1972)

Personal information
- Nationality: Japanese
- Born: 7 April 1972 (age 52); Niigata, Japan

Sport
- Sport: Cross-country skiing

Kumiko Yokoyama (横山 久美子, Yokoyama Kumiko, born 7 April 1972) is a Japanese cross-country skier. She competed in five events at the 1998 Winter Olympics.
