= Irina Skripnik =

Belarusian cross-country skier (born 1970)

Personal information
- Nationality: Belarusian
- Born: 26 January 1970 (age 55); Tula, Soviet Union

Sport
- Sport: Cross-country skiing

Irina Skripnik (born 26 January 1970) is a Belarusian cross-country skier. She competed at the 1998 Winter Olympics and the 2002 Winter Olympics.
