= John Bauer (skier) =

American cross-country skier (born 1969)

John William Bauer (born February 6, 1969, in Champlin, Minnesota, United States) is an American cross-country skier. He competed in three Winter Olympics, earning his best finish of 5th in the men's 4 by 10 kilometres relay at the 2002 games.

He attended Anoka High School and was active in the concert band and a member of the National Honor Society. In Nordic skiing, Bauer was a two-time state champion (1986 and 1987) and began his post-secondary career at Folkhogskola Ski School in Mora, Sweden (1987-1988) and then attended Central Oregon Community College in Bend, Oregon (1988-1990).

As a member of the United States Olympic Ski Team he represented his country in Albertville, France, in 1992; Nagano, Japan, in 1998; and Salt Lake City, Utah, in 2002. In addition to competing in three Olympics, Bauer also raced in 16 USA National Championships and five World Championships.

Bauer graduated from the University of Minnesota in 1997 with degrees in history and German. Bauer currently resides in Hayward, Wisconsin, with his wife, Susan, and their children Anneliese and Bryce. In September 2011, Bauer was named to the inaugural class of the Anoka High School Hall of Fame.
