= Tomomi Otaka =

Japanese cross-country skier (born 1976)

Personal information
- Nationality: Japanese
- Born: 21 November 1976 (age 48); Rumoi, Hokkaido, Japan

Sport
- Sport: Biathlon

Tomomi Otaka (Japanese: 大高 友美, Hepburn: Ōtaka Tomomi, born 21 November 1976) is a Japanese cross-country skier and biathlete. She competed in the cross-country skiing at the 1998 Winter Olympics and the 2002 Winter Olympics and in the biathlon at the 2006 Winter Olympics.
