= Patrick Weaver =

American cross-country skier

Personal information
- Nationality: American
- Born: May 29, 1969 (age 55); Frankfurt, Germany

Sport
- Sport: Cross-country skiing

Patrick Weaver (born May 29, 1969) is an American former cross-country skier. He competed at the 1998 Winter Olympics and the 2002 Winter Olympics. He later became a skiing coach.

== Biography ==
Weaver was born Frankfurt, Germany in 1969. Growing up in Lenox, Massachusetts, Weaver began to ski when he was seven years old. He worked at Home Depot, taking up a training opportunity scheme, where he was paid as a full-time employee, but was allowed to work part-time in order to train. He studied at the University of New Hampshire for a business degree. Weaver was later inducted into the Hall of Fame at the University. He became the US national champion in cross-country skiing in 1998 and 1999.

Weaver competed in seven cross-country skiing events at the 1998 Winter Olympics and the 2002 Winter Olympics, with a best finish of 16th place in the men's 15 kilometre classical event at the 2002 Olympics.

In 2004, Weaver became a Nordic ski coach in Bend, Oregon, and went on to become the Nordic coach at the University of Vermont in 2010. In 2011, the Eastern Intercollegiate Ski Association named Weaver as the coach of the year. In 2019, the New England Nordic Ski Association also named Weaver as the coach of the year.
