= Yelena Sinkevich =

Belarusian cross-country skier (born 1971)

Personal information
- Nationality: Belarusian
- Born: 16 May 1971 (age 53); Minsk, Byelorussian SSR, Soviet Union

Sport
- Sport: Cross-country skiing

Yelena Sinkevich (born 16 May 1971) is a Belarusian cross-country skier. She competed at the 1994 Winter Olympics and the 1998 Winter Olympics.
