= Marcus Nash (skier) =

American cross-country skier (born 1971)

Personal information
- Nationality: American
- Born: April 1, 1971 (age 53); Bristol, England

Sport
- Sport: Cross-country skiing

Marcus Nash (born April 1, 1971) is an American cross-country skier. He competed at the 1994 Winter Olympics and the 1998 Winter Olympics.
