= Justin Wadsworth =

American cross-country skier

Personal information
- Born: August 14, 1968 (age 57) La Jolla, San Diego, United States

Sport
- Sport: Cross-country skiing

Justin Wadsworth (born August 14, 1968) is an American former cross-country skier and coach. He competed at the 1994 Winter Olympics, the 1998 Winter Olympics and the 2002 Winter Olympics. He is also known for an act of sportsmanship at the 2014 Winter Olympics, when as head coach of the Canadian ski team, he rushed to hand one of his charges' spare ski to Russian Anton Gafarov after he had fallen and broken one of his skis at the Sochi Olympic Games in 2014.

== Biography ==
Wadsworth was born in La Jolla, San Diego in 1968. He competed in nine events at three Winter Olympics in cross-country skiing. While at a skiing competition, he met his future wife Beckie Scott. Wadsworth later became a coach, and moved to Canmore, Alberta with his wife. In 2010 in Canada, he became the head coach of the Canadian cross-country ski team.

At the 2014 Winter Olympics in Sochi, Wadsworth was the head coach of the Canadian cross-country skiing team. During the men's sprint event, Russian skier Anton Gafarov broke a ski as he was approaching the finish line. Wadsworth witnessed the incident and gave Gafarov a spare ski from Canada's stock. Wadsworth later said that he could not do nothing in the situation and that he "wanted him to have dignity as he crossed the finish line".

After becoming the head coach of the Canadian cross-country ski team in 2010, Wadsworth left the role in 2016, to focus his time on his young family. In late 2019, Wadsworth was named as the head coach of Biathlon Canada ahead of the 2019/2020 season.
