= Snow Harp =

Cross-country skiing venue in Japan

- Interactive map of Snow Harp
- Full name: Hakuba Cross-Country Stadium (白馬クロスカントリー競技場)
- Location: Hakuba, Nagano, Japan
- Coordinates: 36°38′04″N 137°51′27″E

Construction
- Groundbreaking: 1994
- Opened: 28 November 1996

Tenants
- 1998 Winter Olympics; 1998 Winter Paralympics; 2005 Special Olympics World Winter Games

Snow Harp is a cross-country skiing venue located in Hakuba, Nagano, Japan. For the 1998 Winter Olympics, the venue hosted the cross-country skiing and the cross-country skiing portion of the Nordic combined events.

Completed in 1996, test events were held in 1997. The venues consisted of three courses that were 4.8 km (3.0 mi), 4.8 km (3.0 mi), and 7.5 km (4.7 mi) in length, respectively. It hosted 12 events during the 1998 Games, the most of any venue.
