= Cross-country skiing at the 1998 Winter Olympics =

Cross-country skiing at the XVIII Olympic Winter Games
- Venue: Snow Harp
- Dates: 8–22 February
- No. of events: 10
- Competitors: 228 (126 men and 102 women) from 37 nations

The 1998 Winter Olympic Games cross-country skiing competition results were as follows.

== Medal summary ==
=== Medal table ===
Rank	Nation	Gold	Silver	Bronze	Total
1	Russia	5	2	1	8
2	Norway	4	3	2	9
3	Finland	1	0	2	3
4	Italy	0	2	2	4
5	Austria	0	1	1	2
5	Czech Republic	0	1	1	2
7	Sweden	0	1	0	1
8	Kazakhstan	0	0	1	1
Totals (8 entries)		10	10	10	30

=== Men's events ===
Event	Gold		Silver		Bronze	
10 km classical	Bjørn Dæhlie; Norway	27:24.5	Markus Gandler; Austria	27:32.5	Mika Myllylä; Finland	27:40.1
15 km freestyle pursuit	Thomas Alsgaard; Norway	1:07:01.7	Bjørn Dæhlie; Norway	1:07:02.8	Vladimir Smirnov; Kazakhstan	1:07:31.5
30 km classical	Mika Myllylä; Finland	1:33:55.8	Erling Jevne; Norway	1:35:27.1	Silvio Fauner; Italy	1:36:08.5
50 km freestyle	Bjørn Dæhlie; Norway	2:05:08.2	Niklas Jonsson; Sweden	2:05:16.3	Christian Hoffmann; Austria	2:06:01.8
4 × 10 km relay	Norway; Sture Sivertsen; Erling Jevne; Bjørn Dæhlie; Thomas Alsgaard	1:40:55.7	Italy; Marco Albarello; Fulvio Valbusa; Fabio Maj; Silvio Fauner	1:40:55.9	Finland; Harri Kirvesniemi; Mika Myllylä; Sami Repo; Jari Isometsä	1:42:15.5

=== Women's events ===
Event	Gold		Silver		Bronze	
5 km classical	Larisa Lazutina; Russia	17:37.9	Kateřina Neumannová; Czech Republic	17:42.7	Bente Martinsen; Norway	17:49.4
10 km freestyle pursuit	Larisa Lazutina; Russia	28:29.9	Olga Danilova; Russia	28:36.7	Kateřina Neumannová; Czech Republic	28:37.2
15 km classical	Olga Danilova; Russia	46:55.4	Larisa Lazutina; Russia	47:01.0	Anita Moen-Guidon; Norway	47:52.6
30 km freestyle	Yuliya Chepalova; Russia	1:22:01.5	Stefania Belmondo; Italy	1:22:11.7	Larisa Lazutina; Russia	1:23:15.7
4 × 5 km relay	Russia; Nina Gavrylyuk; Olga Danilova; Yelena Välbe; Larisa Lazutina	55:13.5	Norway; Bente Martinsen; Marit Mikkelsplass; Elin Nilsen; Anita Moen-Guidon	55:38.0	Italy; Karin Moroder; Gabriella Paruzzi; Manuela Di Centa; Stefania Belmondo	56:53.3

== Participating NOCs ==
Thirty-six nations competed in the cross-country skiing events at Nagano.

- Australia
- Austria
- Belarus
- Bulgaria
- Canada
- China
- Croatia
- Czech Republic
- Denmark
- Estonia
- Finland
- France
- Germany
- Greece
- Hungary
- Italy
- Japan
- Kazakhstan
- Kenya
- Latvia
- Liechtenstein
- Lithuania
- Macedonia
- Mongolia
- Norway
- Poland
- Romania
- Russia
- Slovakia
- Slovenia
- South Korea
- Spain
- Sweden
- Switzerland
- Ukraine
- United States
