= Ukraine at the 1998 Winter Olympics =

- IOC code: UKR
- NOC: National Olympic Committee of Ukraine
- Website: www.noc-ukr.org (in Ukrainian and English)

in Nagano
- Competitors: 56 (30 men, 26 women) in 10 sports
- Flag bearer: Andriy Deryzemlya (biathlon)
- Medals Ranked 18th: Gold 0 Silver 1 Bronze 0 Total 1

Winter Olympics appearances (overview)
- 1994; 1998; 2002; 2006; 2010; 2014; 2018; 2022; 2026

Other related appearances
- Czechoslovakia (1924–1936); Poland (1924–1936); Romania (1924–1936); Soviet Union (1956–1988); Unified Team (1992)

Ukraine was represented at the 1998 Winter Olympics in Nagano, Japan by the National Olympic Committee of Ukraine.

In total, 56 athletes including 30 men and 26 women represented Ukraine in 10 different sports including alpine skiing, biathlon, bobsleigh, cross-country skiing, figure skating, freestyle skating, luge, short track speed skating, ski jumping and speed skating.

Ukraine won one medal at the games after Olena Petrova claimed silver in the biathlon women's individual.

== Competitors ==
In total, 56 athletes represented Ukraine at the 1998 Winter Olympics in Nagano, Japan across 10 different sports.

Sport	Men	Women	Total
Alpine skiing	1	1	2
Biathlon	4	6	10
Bobsleigh	2	–	2
Cross-country skiing	5	5	10
Figure skating	5	5	10
Freestyle skiing	3	4	7
Luge	4	2	6
Short track speed skating	1	1	2
Ski jumping	3	–	3
Speed skating	2	2	4
Total	30	26	56

== Medalists ==
Ukraine won one medal at the games after Olena Petrova claimed silver in the biathlon women's 15 km individual.

Medal	Name	Sport	Event
Silver	Olena Petrova	Biathlon	Women's 15 km individual

== Alpine skiing ==
In total, two Ukrainian athletes participated in the alpine skiing events – Yuliya Kharkivska in the women's downhill and the women's combined and Mykola Skriabin in the men's combined.

Athlete	Event	Race 1	Race 2	Total	
Athlete	Event	Time	Time	Time	Rank
Yuliya Kharkivska	Women's downhill			1:35.60	33

Athlete	Event	Slalom		Downhill	Total	
Athlete	Event	Time 1	Time 2	Time	Total time	Rank
Mykola Skriabin	Men's combined	55.18	51.99	1:43.08	3:30.25	12
Yuliya Kharkivska	Women's combined	1:35.84	41.10	40.17	2:57.11	20

== Biathlon ==
In total, 10 Ukrainian athletes participated in the biathlon events – Vyacheslav Derkach, Andriy Deryzemlya, Mykola Krupnyk, Nina Lemesh, Ruslan Lysenko, Iryna Merkushina, Olena Petrova, Valentina Tserbe-Nessina, Tetiana Vodop'ianova and Olena Zubrilova-Ohurtsova.

Event	Athlete	Misses ^{1}	Time	Rank
Men's 10 km Sprint	Andriy Deryzemlya	3	30:33.6	45
Men's 10 km Sprint	Ruslan Lysenko	0	29:49.6	30

Event	Athlete	Time	Misses	Adjusted time ^{2}	Rank
Men's 20 km	Mykola Krupnyk	59:36.3	6	1'05:36.3	63
Men's 20 km	Vyacheslav Derkach	59:14.6	4	1'03:14.6	50

Event	Athletes	Race		
Event	Athletes	Misses ^{1}	Time	Rank
Men's relay	Vyacheslav Derkach; Ruslan Lysenko; Mykola Krupnyk; Andriy Deryzemlya	4	1'28:57.1	18

Event	Athlete	Misses ^{1}	Time	Rank
Women's 7.5 km Sprint	Iryna Merkushina	3	25:58.6	49
Women's 7.5 km Sprint	Nina Lemesh	1	24:39.8	21
Women's 7.5 km Sprint	Tetiana Vodop'ianova	0	24:23.3	19
Women's 7.5 km Sprint	Olena Petrova	1	24:04.5	11

Event	Athlete	Time	Misses	Adjusted time ^{2}	Rank
Women's 15 km	Valentina Tserbe-Nessina	57:58.8	4	1'01:58.8	47
Women's 15 km	Olena Zubrilova-Ohurtsova	57:43.0	2	59:43.0	28
Women's 15 km	Tetiana Vodop'ianova	55:45.9	3	58:45.9	24
Women's 15 km	Olena Petrova	54:09.8	1	55:09.8	2nd place, silver medalist(s)

Event	Athletes	Race		
Event	Athletes	Misses ^{1}	Time	Rank
Women's relay	Valentina Tserbe-Nessina; Olena Petrova; Tetiana Vodop'ianova; Olena Zubrilova-Ohurtsova	0	1'42:32.6	5

^{1} A penalty loop of 150 metres had to be skied per missed target.
^{2} One minute added per missed target.

== Bobsleigh ==
In total, two Ukrainian athletes participated in the bobsleigh events – Yuriy Panchuk and Oleh Polyvach in the two-man bob.

Sled	Athletes	Event	Run 1		Run 2		Run 3		Run 4		Total	
Sled	Athletes	Event	Time	Rank	Time	Rank	Time	Rank	Time	Rank	Time	Rank
UKR-1	Yuriy Panchuk; Oleh Polyvach	Two-man	55.47	20	55.36	22	55.52	23	55.47	23	3:41.82	23

== Cross-country skiing ==
In total, 10 Ukrainian athletes participated in the cross-country skiing events – Mykhailo Artiukhov, Olena Haiasova, Hennadiy Nykon, Maryna Pestriakova, Mykola Popovych, Valentina Shevchenko, Hanna Slipenko, Iryna Taranenko-Terelia, Oleksandr Ushkalenko and Oleksandr Zarovniy.

Event	Athlete	Race	
Event	Athlete	Time	Rank
Men's 10 km C	Oleksandr Zarovniy	DNF	–
Men's 10 km C	Mykhailo Artiukhov	31:52.8	72
Men's 10 km C	Hennadiy Nykon	31:07.6	60
Men's 10 km C	Mykola Popovych	30:51.2	55
Men's 15 km pursuit^{1} F	Mykola Popovych	DNF	–
Men's 15 km pursuit^{1} F	Mykhailo Artiukhov	46:28.5	52
Men's 15 km pursuit^{1} F	Hennadiy Nykon	45:20.1	46
Men's 30 km C	Oleksandr Ushkalenko	1'44:15.7	48
Men's 30 km C	Oleksandr Zarovniy	1'43:26.2	44
Men's 30 km C	Hennadiy Nykon	1'42:32.7	38
Men's 30 km C	Mykhailo Artiukhov	1'41:13.0	29
Men's 50 km F	Oleksandr Ushkalenko	2'27:09.1	57
Men's 50 km F	Mykola Popovych	2'22:48.0	50
Men's 50 km F	Mykhailo Artiukhov	2'20:59.2	46
Men's 50 km F	Oleksandr Zarovniy	2'20:31.0	43
Men's 4 × 10 km relay	Hennadiy Nykon; Oleksandr Zarovniy; Mykhailo Artiukhov; Mykola Popovych	1'44:33.9	12
Women's 5 km C	Olena Haiasova	19:18.2	41
Women's 5 km C	Maryna Pestriakova	19:17.6	40
Women's 5 km C	Valentina Shevchenko	18:47.5	19
Women's 5 km C	Iryna Taranenko-Terelia	18:17.2	11
Women's 10 km pursuit^{2} F	Maryna Pestriakova	32:18.7	36
Women's 10 km pursuit^{2} F	Olena Haiasova	31:51.9	30
Women's 10 km pursuit^{2} F	Valentina Shevchenko	30:38.8	20
Women's 10 km pursuit^{2} F	Iryna Taranenko-Terelia	28:40.1	4
Women's 15 km C	Olena Haiasova	DNF	–
Women's 15 km C	Maryna Pestriakova	50:45.6	23
Women's 15 km C	Valentina Shevchenko	49:12.9	11
Women's 15 km C	Iryna Taranenko-Terelia	48:10.2	4
Women's 30 km F	Hanna Slipenko	DNF	–
Women's 30 km F	Olena Haiasova	1'31:01.0	27
Women's 30 km F	Valentina Shevchenko	1'28:20.0	14
Women's 30 km F	Iryna Taranenko-Terelia	1'25:22.3	8
Women's 4 × 5 km relay	Valentina Shevchenko; Iryna Taranenko-Terelia; Olena Haiasova; Maryna Pestriakova	57:54.8	9

^{1} Starting delay based on 10 km results.
^{2} Starting delay based on 5 km results.
C = Classical style, F = Freestyle

== Figure skating ==
In total, 10 Ukrainian athletes participated in the figure skating events – Dmitry Dmitrenko and Viacheslav Zagorodniuk in the men's singles, Yulia Lavrenchuk and Elena Liashenko in the women's singles, Evgenia Filonenko and Igor Marchenko in the pairs and Ruslan Goncharov, Elena Grushina, Irina Romanova and Igor Yaroshenko in the ice dance.

Athlete	Event	SP	FS	TFP	Rank
Dmitry Dmitrenko	Men's singles	8	16	20.0	14
Viacheslav Zagorodniuk	Men's singles	16	8	16.0	10
Yulia Lavrenchuk	Women's singles	15	9	16.5	11
Elena Liashenko	Women's singles	7	10	13.5	9
Evgenia Filonenko; Igor Marchenko	Pairs	13	10	16.5	11

Athletes	CD1	CD2	OD	FD	TFP	Rank
Elena Grushina; Ruslan Goncharov	15	16	15	15	30.2	15
Irina Romanova; Igor Yaroshenko	9	8	10	9	18.4	9

== Freestyle skiing ==
In total, seven Ukrainian athletes participated in the freestyle skiing events – Serhiy But, Stanislav Kravchuk and Yuriy Stetsko in the men's aerials and Yuliya Kliukova, Tetiana Kozachenko, Alla Tsuper and Olena Yunchyk in the women's aerials.

Athlete	Event	Qualification		Final	
Athlete	Event	Points	Rank	Points	Rank
Serhiy But	Men's aerials	110.61	24	did not advance	
Yuriy Stetsko	Men's aerials	171.46	19	did not advance	
Stanislav Kravchuk	Men's aerials	226.65	6 Q	219.94	9
Olena Yunchyk	Women's aerials	156.95	12 Q	139.05	10
Yuliya Kliukova	Women's aerials	161.59	11 Q	153.15	8
Tetiana Kozachenko	Women's aerials	162.09	9 Q	167.32	4
Alla Tsuper	Women's aerials	178.46	2 Q	166.12	5

== Luge ==
In total, six Ukrainian athletes participated in the luge events – Oleh Avdeev, Andriy Mukhin, Danylo Panchenko and Ihor Urbanskiy in the doubles and Liliya Ludan and Nataliya Yakushenko in the women's singles.

Athletes	Event	Run 1		Run 2		Total	
Athletes	Event	Time	Rank	Time	Rank	Time	Rank
Ihor Urbanskiy; Andriy Mukhin	Doubles	51.262	7	50.706	5	1:41.968	7
Oleh Avdeev; Danylo Panchenko	Doubles	51.413	11	51.275	12	1:42.688	11

Athlete	Event	Run 1		Run 2		Run 3		Run 4		Total	
Athlete	Event	Time	Rank	Time	Rank	Time	Rank	Time	Rank	Time	Rank
Liliya Ludan	Women's singles	52.213	17	52.087	15	51.815	19	51.596	19	3:27.711	16
Nataliya Yakushenko	Women's singles	52.014	13	51.746	9	51.511	11	51.277	12	3:26.548	11

== Short track speed skating ==
In total, two Ukrainian athletes participated in the short track speed skating events – Nataliya Sverchikova in the women's 500 m and the women's 1,000 m and Yevhen Yakovlev in the men's 500 m and the men's 1,000 m.

Athlete	Event	Round one		Quarter finals		Semi finals		Finals	
Athlete	Event	Time	Rank	Time	Rank	Time	Rank	Time	Final rank
Yevhen Yakovlev	Men's 500 m	44.041	3	did not advance					
Yevhen Yakovlev	Men's 1,000 m	1:36.005	3	did not advance					
Nataliya Sverchikova	Women's 500 m	46.976	3	did not advance					
Nataliya Sverchikova	Women's 1,000 m	1:45.279	4	did not advance					

== Ski jumping ==
In total, three Ukrainian athletes participated in the ski jumping events – Volodymyr Hlyvka, Liubym Kohan and Ivan Kozlov in the normal hill individual and the large hill individual.

Athlete	Event	Jump 1			Jump 2		Total	
Athlete	Event	Distance	Points	Rank	Distance	Points	Points	Rank
Liubym Kohan	Normal hill	67.5	63.5	56	did not advance			
Volodymyr Hlyvka	Normal hill	73.0	77.0	47	did not advance			
Ivan Kozlov	Normal hill	76.0	85.5	31	did not advance			
Liubym Kohan	Large hill	79.0	35.2	61	did not advance			
Ivan Kozlov	Large hill	108.0	91.9	36	did not advance			
Volodymyr Hlyvka	Large hill	109.0	94.7	30 Q	98.5	73.8	168.5	29

== Speed skating ==
In total, four Ukrainian athletes participated in the speed skating events – Lesia Bilozub in the women's 500 m and the women's 1,000 m, Svitlana Konstantynova in the women's 1,500 m and the women's 3,000 m, Oleh Kostromitin in the men's 500 m and the men's 1,000 m and Serhiy Priz in the men's 5,000 m.

Event	Athlete	Race 1		Race 2		Total	
Event	Athlete	Time	Rank	Time	Rank	Time	Rank
Men's 500 m	Oleh Kostromitin	37.27	37	37.19	35	74.46	35
Men's 1,000 m	Oleh Kostromitin					1:14.53	39
Men's 5,000 m	Serhiy Priz					6:54.27	28
Women's 500 m	Lesia Bilozub	40.42	28	40.52	27	80.94	27
Women's 1,000 m	Lesia Bilozub					1:21.84	28
Women's 1,500 m	Svitlana Konstantynova					2:08.76	33
Women's 3,000 m	Svitlana Konstantynova					4:37.27	30
