= Ukraine at the 2005 Winter Universiade =

- IOC code: UKR
- NOC: Sports Students Union of Ukraine
- Website: osvitasport.org

in Innsbruck and Seefeld, Austria 12 January 2005 – 22 January 2005
- Competitors: 96 in 10 sports
- Medals Ranked 6th: Gold 4 Silver 10 Bronze 2 Total 16

Winter Universiade appearances (overview)
- 1993; 1995; 1997; 1999; 2001; 2003; 2005; 2007; 2009; 2011; 2013; 2015; 2017; 2019; 2023; 2025

Ukraine competed at the 2005 Winter Universiade in Innsbruck and Seefeld, Austria. Ukraine won 16 medals, four of which were gold, ranked 6th by both number of gold medals and overall number of medals.

== Medallists ==
Medal	Name	Sport	Event
Gold	Olexander Bilanenko	Biathlon	Men's 20 km individual
Gold	Oksana Khvostenko	Biathlon	Women's 12,5 km mass start
Gold	Oksana Khvostenko; Inna Suprun; Oksana Yakovleva	Biathlon	Women's relay
Gold	Roman Leybyuk	Cross-country skiing	Men's 10 km freestyle
Silver	Olexander Bilanenko	Biathlon	Men's 10 km sprint
Silver	Andriy Deryzemlya	Biathlon	Men's 12,5 km pursuit
Silver	Roman Pryma	Biathlon	Men's 15 km mass start
Silver	Oleh Berezhnyi; Roman Pryma; Oleksiy Korobeinikov; Andriy Deryzemlya	Biathlon	Men's relay
Silver	Oksana Yakovleva	Biathlon	Women's 15 km individual
Silver	Oksana Khvostenko	Biathlon	Women's 7,5 km sprint
Silver	Oksana Khvostenko	Biathlon	Women's 10 km pursuit
Silver	Galina Maniachenko	Figure skating	Ladies
Silver	Tatiana Volosozhar; Stanislav Morozov	Figure skating	Pairs
Silver	Julia Golovina; Oleg Voiko	Figure skating	Ice dancing
Bronze	Olexander Bilanenko	Biathlon	Men's 12,5 km pursuit
Bronze	Olexiy Prokhor; Roman Leybyuk; Olexandr Putsko; Mykhailo Humeniak	Cross-country skiing	Men's relay

== Figure skating ==
Athlete	Event	Rank
Anton Kovalevski	Men's singles	14
Halyna Maniachenko	Ladies' singles	2nd place, silver medalist(s)
Iryna Lukianenko	Ladies' singles	17
Tetiana Volosozhar; Stanislav Morozov	Pairs	2nd place, silver medalist(s)
Yuliia Bilohlazova; Andriy Bekh	Pairs	6
Yuliia Holovina; Oleh Voyko	Ice dance	2nd place, silver medalist(s)
Anna Zadorozhniuk; Serhiy Verbillo	Ice dance	6
Alla Beknazarova; Volodymyr Zuev	Ice dance	7

== Short track speed skating ==
Ukraine was represented by 5 athletes.

Men

Athlete	Event	Prel. Heat		Heat		Quarterfinal		Semifinal		Final	
Athlete	Event	Time	Rank	Time	Rank	Time	Rank	Time	Rank	Time	Rank
Vladimir Grigoryev	500 m	44.027	2 Q	42.978	1 Q	43.172	2 Q	43.154	4	Did not advance	
Vladimir Grigoryev	1000 m	1:29.604	1 Q	1:32.495	2 Q	1:32.556	2 Q	1:30.796	4	Did not advance	
Vladimir Grigoryev	1500 m	—N/a		2:31.690	1 Q	—N/a		2:19.963	4	Did not advance	
Vladimir Grigoryev	3000 m	—N/a		5:45.804	2 Q	—N/a		5:40.350	8	Did not advance	
Yevhen Yakovlev	500 m	DSQ		Did not advance							
Yevhen Yakovlev	1000 m	—N/a		1:33.673	3	Did not advance					
Yevhen Yakovlev	1500 m	—N/a		2:39.654	5	—N/a		Did not advance			
Yevhen Yakovlev	3000 m	—N/a		5:30.941	6	—N/a		Did not advance			
Serhiy Lifyrenko	500 m	45.110	3	Did not advance							
Serhiy Lifyrenko	1500 m	—N/a		2:25.780	3 q	—N/a		2:24.655	6	Did not advance	
Serhiy Lifyrenko	3000 m	—N/a		5:21.253	7	—N/a		Did not advance			
Volodymyr Chernega	500 m	44.445	3	Did not advance							
Mykhaylo Serheyko	1000 m	1:43.727	2 Q	1:34.660	3	Did not advance					
Mykhaylo Serheyko	1500 m	—N/a		2:37.064	2 Q	—N/a		2:30.320	6	Did not advance	
Mykhaylo Serheyko	3000 m	—N/a		5:38.990	6	—N/a		Did not advance			
Vladimir Grigoryev; Serhiy Lifyrenko; Mykhaylo Serheyko; Yevhen Yakovlev	5000 m relay	—N/a						7:11.838	3	Did not advance	

== See also ==
- Ukraine at the 2005 Summer Universiade

== Sources ==
- Archive of the official web site
- Archive file with all results
- Results in cross-country skiing
- Results in figure skating
- Results in short track speed skating
