= Ukraine at the FISU World University Games =

Ukraine at the Universiade
- IOC code: UKR
- National federation: Ukrainian University Sports Association
- Website: studsport.com.ua
- Medals Ranked 8th: Gold 220 Silver 233 Bronze 226 Total 679

Summer appearances
- 1993; 1995; 1997; 1999; 2001; 2003; 2005; 2007; 2009; 2011; 2013; 2015; 2017; 2019; 2021; 2025

Winter appearances
- 1993; 1995; 1997; 1999; 2001; 2003; 2005; 2007; 2009; 2011; 2013; 2015; 2017; 2019; 2023; 2025

Ukraine has participated in all Summer and Winter Universiades since the dissolution of the Soviet Union in 1991.

== Medal count ==
=== Medals at the Summer Universiade ===
Universiade	Gold	Silver	Bronze		Rank
1959–1991	part of Soviet Union				
(United States) 1993 Buffalo	11	6	9	26	4
(Japan) 1995 Fukuoka	4	5	6	15	9
(Italy) 1997 Sicily	17	6	4	27	2
(Spain) 1999 Palma de Mallorca	7	7	8	22	7
(China) 2001 Beijing	13	14	7	34	4
(South Korea) 2003 Daegu	23	15	17	55	4
(Turkey) 2005 İzmir	18	16	18	51	4
(Thailand) 2007 Bangkok	28	22	18	68	3
(Serbia) 2009 Belgrade	7	11	13	31	6
(China) 2011 Shenzhen	12	19	14	45	7
(Russia) 2013 Kazan	12	28	36	76	6
(South Korea) 2015 Gwangju	8	17	6	31	8
2017 Taipei	12	11	13	36	6
(Italy) 2019 Naples	6	7	7	20	11
(China) 2021 Chengdu	4	4	3	11	13
(Germany) 2025 Rhine-Ruhr	4	3	5	12	14
(South Korea) 2027 Chungcheong	Future events				
(United States) 2029 North Carolina	Future events				
Total	186	189	182	559	8

=== Medals at the Winter Universiade ===
Universiade	Gold	Silver	Bronze		Rank
1960–1991	part of Soviet Union				
(Poland) 1993 Zakopane	1	0	0	1	11
(Spain) 1995 Jaca	0	0	4	4	18
(South Korea) 1997 Muju-Chonju	0	2	2	4	15
(Slovakia) 1999 Poprad-Tatry	4	1	2	7	6
(Poland) 2001 Zakopane	1	1	2	4	11
(Italy) 2003 Tarvisio	7	4	3	14	2
(Austria) 2005 Innsbruck	4	10	2	16	6
(Italy) 2007 Turin	2	8	6	16	11
(China) 2009 Harbin	1	2	4	7	13
(Turkey) 2011 Erzurum	6	5	4	15	3
(Italy) 2013 Trentino	3	3	3	9	8
(Spain) / (Slovakia) 2015 Granada and Štrbské Pleso	2	1	2	5	13
(Kazakhstan) 2017 Almaty	2	3	4	9	10
(Russia) 2019 Krasnoyarsk	Did not participated				
(United States) 2023 Lake Placid	1	1	4	6	18
(Italy) 2025 Turin	4	4	4	12	10
(China) 2027 Changchun	Future event				
Total	38	45	46	129	13

=== Medals by summer sport ===
As of 2025.

Sport	Gold	Silver	Bronze	Total
Athletics	51	37	26	114
Swimming	37	27	23	87
Rhythmic gymnastics	27	31	21	79
Fencing	23	18	14	55
Artistic gymnastics	21	19	24	64
Shooting	6	8	8	22
Rowing	3	8	3	14
Diving	3	7	10	20
Taekwondo	3	1	6	10
Archery	2	5	7	14
Wrestling	2	4	9	15
Football	2	1	0	3
Boxing	2	0	1	3
Judo	1	5	17	23
Cycling	1	2	1	4
Weightlifting	1	2	1	4
Canoeing	1	2	0	3
Sambo	0	5	2	7
Volleyball	0	3	1	4
Belt wrestling	0	2	4	6
Tennis	0	2	2	4
Basketball	0	1	0	1
Chess	0	1	0	1
Beach volleyball	0	0	1	1
Table tennis	0	0	1	1
Wushu	0	0	1	1
Totals (26 entries)	186	191	183	560

=== Medals by winter sport ===
As of 2025.

Sport	Gold	Silver	Bronze	Total
Biathlon	26	30	24	80
Cross-country skiing	8	6	13	27
Figure skating	2	5	2	9
Snowboarding	1	2	4	7
Ice hockey	1	0	2	3
Freestyle skiing	0	2	0	2
Nordic combined	0	0	1	1
Totals (7 entries)	38	45	46	129

== Most successful Ukrainian competitors ==
=== Summer Univesiades ===
221 Ukrainian athletes won at least two medals at Winter Universiades. Among athletes who won more than 6 medals are also Olena Dmytrash (rhythmic gymnastics, 9 medals), Hanna Rizatdinova (rhythmic gymnastics, 8 medals), Ihor Radivilov (artistic gymnastics, 7 medals), Serhiy Breus, Vyacheslav Shyrshov, Serhiy Frolov (all — swimming, 6 medals), Natalia Hodunko, Oleksandra Hridasova, and Yevheniia Homon (all — rhythmic gymnastics, 6 medals).

As of 2025.

No	Athlete	Sport	1st place, gold medalist(s)	2nd place, silver medalist(s)	3rd place, bronze medalist(s)	Total
1	Anna Bessonova	Rhythmic gymnastics	10	8	1	19
2	Yana Klochkova	Swimming	7	1	0	8
3	Oleh Lisohor	Swimming	6	2	1	9
4	Olena Vitrychenko	Rhythmic gymnastics	4	1	0	5
4	Tamara Yerofeeva	Rhythmic gymnastics	4	1	0	5
6	Ihor Snitko	Swimming	4	0	0	4
6	Yana Shemyakina	Fencing	4	0	0	4
8	Oleg Verniaiev	Artistic gymnastics	3	5	6	14
9	Andriy Serdinov	Swimming	3	3	0	6
10	Olena Kostevych	Shooting	3	2	4	9

=== Winter Univesiades ===
45 Ukrainian athletes won at least two medals at Winter Universiades. Among athletes who won more than 4 medals are also Iana Bondar (biathlon, 6 medals), Roman Pryma and Oleh Berezhnyi (both — biathlon, 5 medals), Valentyna Semerenko, Oleksiy Korobeinikov, Serhiy Sednev (all — biathlon, 4 medals), and Mykola Popovych (cross-country skiing, 4 medals).

As of 2025.

No	Athlete	Sport	1st place, gold medalist(s)	2nd place, silver medalist(s)	3rd place, bronze medalist(s)	Total
1	Oksana Khvostenko	Biathlon	4	3	2	9
2	Vita Semerenko	Biathlon	4	1	2	7
3	Valentyna Shevchenko	Cross-country skiing	4	0	2	6
4	Artem Pryma	Biathlon	3	1	0	4
5	Kateryna Hryhorenko	Cross-country skiing	2	3	3	8
6	Oksana Yakovlieva	Biathlon	2	3	1	6
7	Andriy Deryzemlya	Biathlon	2	2	1	5
8	Oleksandr Bilanenko	Biathlon	2	1	2	5
9	Serhiy Semenov	Biathlon	2	1	1	4
10	Bohdan Borkovskyi	Biathlon	2	0	1	3

== See also ==
- Ukraine at the Olympics
- Ukraine at the Paralympics
- Ukraine at the European Games
- Ukraine at the Youth Olympics
- Ukraine at the European Youth Olympic Festival
- Ukraine at the World Games
