= Ukraine at the 1999 Winter Universiade =

- IOC code: UKR
- NOC: Sports Students Union of Ukraine
- Website: osvitasport.org

in Poprad, Slovakia 22 January 1999 – 30 January
- Medals Ranked 6th: Gold 4 Silver 1 Bronze 2 Total 7

Winter Universiade appearances (overview)
- 1993; 1995; 1997; 1999; 2001; 2003; 2005; 2007; 2009; 2011; 2013; 2015; 2017; 2019; 2023; 2025

Ukraine competed at the 1999 Winter Universiade in Poprad, Slovakia. Ukraine won 7 medals: four gold, one silver, and two bronze medals.

== Medallists ==
| Medal | Name | Sport | Event |
|---|---|---|---|
| Gold | Valentyna Shevchenko | Cross-country skiing | 5 km |
| Gold | Valentyna Shevchenko | Cross-country skiing | 10 km pursuit |
| Gold | Valentyna Shevchenko | Cross-country skiing | 15 km mass start |
| Gold | Oleksandr Fedorov; Denys Pashinskyi; Dmytro Zyrul; Oleh Blahoi; Serhiy Deshevyi; Andriy Savchenko; Vladyslav Shevchenko; Serhiy Harkusha; Serhiy Sadiy; Yuriy Navarenko; Serhiy Hodovanyi; Yevhen Kabanets; Ruslan Bezshchasnyi; Oleh Krykunenko; Vasyl Bobrovnykov; Dmytro Markvskyi; Danylo Didkovskyi; Oleksandr Zinevych; Valeriy Svoboda | Ice hockey | Men's team |
| Silver | Oleksandr Bilanenko; Yuriy Yemelyanenko; Oleh Babich; Mykola Krupnyk | Biathlon | Men's relay |
| Bronze | Oksana Khvostenko | Biathlon | Women's individual race |
| Bronze | Valentyna Shevchenko; Marina Pestrekova; Vita Yakymchuk | Cross-country skiing | Women's relay |

== Figure skating ==
| Athlete | Event | Rank |
|---|---|---|
| Yevhen Martynov | Men's singles | 9 |
| Anna Neshcheret | Ladies' singles | 5 |
| Halyna Maniachenko | Ladies' singles | 7 |
| Olena Solonnikova; Yevhen Polishchuk | Ice dance | 8 |
| Darya Manoylo; Vasyl Baranov | Ice dance | 10 |

== Short track speed skating ==
Ukraine was represented by 5 athletes.

Men

| Athlete | Event | Prel. | | Heat | | Quarterfinal | | Semifinal | | Final | |
| Athlete | Event | Time | Rank | Time | Rank | Time | Rank | Time | Rank | Time | Rank |
|---|---|---|---|---|---|---|---|---|---|---|---|
| Yevhen Yakovlev | 500 m | 44.002 | 2 Q | 43.714 | 4 | Did not advance | | | | | |
| Yevhen Yakovlev | 1000 m | DSQ | | Did not advance | | | | | | | |
| Yevhen Yakovlev | 1500 m | —N/a | | 2:27.515 | 3 Q | —N/a | | 2:21.360 | 6 | Did not advance | |
| Yevhen Yakovlev | 3000 m | —N/a | | 5:33.801 | 3 Q | —N/a | | 5:24.867 | 5 | Did not advance | |

Women

| Athlete | Event | Prel. | | Heat | | Quarterfinal | | Semifinal | | Final | |
| Athlete | Event | Time | Rank | Time | Rank | Time | Rank | Time | Rank | Time | Rank |
|---|---|---|---|---|---|---|---|---|---|---|---|
| Iryna Yacoub | 500 m | —N/a | | 49.010 | 4 | Did not advance | | | | | |
| Iryna Yacoub | 1000 m | —N/a | | 1:46.782 | 3 | Did not advance | | | | | |
| Iryna Yacoub | 1500 m | —N/a | | 2:50.156 | 4 | —N/a | | Did not advance | | | |
| Iryna Yacoub | 3000 m | —N/a | | 5:43.315 | 4 | —N/a | | Did not advance | | | |
| Nataliya Sverchikova | 500 m | —N/a | | 47.674 | 1 Q | Q | | 46.773 | 3 | Did not advance | |
| Nataliya Sverchikova | 1000 m | —N/a | | 1:43.498 | 2 Q | DQ | | Did not advance | | | |
| Nataliya Sverchikova | 1500 m | —N/a | | 2:39.877 | 3 Q | —N/a | | DQ | | Did not advance | |
| Nataliya Sverchikova | 3000 m | —N/a | | 5:51.379 | 2 Q | —N/a | | DNS | | Did not advance | |
| Olga Solomatina | 500 m | —N/a | | 47.710 | 3 | Did not advance | | | | | |
| Olga Solomatina | 1000 m | —N/a | | 1:40.439 | 4 | Did not advance | | | | | |
| Olga Solomatina | 1500 m | —N/a | | 2:35.750 | 4 | —N/a | | Did not advance | | | |
| Olga Solomatina | 3000 m | —N/a | | 5:59.253 | 3 Q | —N/a | | DNS | | Did not advance | |
| Yulia Soldatenkova | 500 m | —N/a | | 50.113 | 3 | Did not advance | | | | | |
| Yulia Soldatenkova | 1000 m | —N/a | | 1:58.107 | 3 | Did not advance | | | | | |
| Yulia Soldatenkova | 1500 m | —N/a | | 2:54.924 | 4 | —N/a | | Did not advance | | | |
| Yulia Soldatenkova | 3000 m | —N/a | | 6:05.650 | 5 | —N/a | | Did not advance | | | |
| Yulia Soldatenkova; Olga Solomatina; Nataliya Sverchikova; Iryna Yacoub | 3000 m relay | —N/a | | | | | | 4:36.617 | 2 Q | 4:31.400 | 4 |

== See also ==
- Ukraine at the 1999 Summer Universiade

== Sources ==
- Results
