= Short-track speed skating at the 1998 Winter Olympics – Women's 1000 metres =

Women's 1000 metres at the XVIII Olympic Winter Games
- Pictogram for short track
- Venue: White Ring
- Dates: 21 February 1998
- Competitors: 31 from 13 nations
- Winning time: 1:42.776

Medalists
1st place, gold medalist(s)		Chun Lee-kyung	South Korea
2nd place, silver medalist(s)		Yang Yang (S)	China
3rd place, bronze medalist(s)		Won Hye-kyung	South Korea

The women's 1000 metres in short track speed skating at the 1998 Winter Olympics took place on 21 February at the White Ring.

== Results ==
=== Heats ===
The first round was held on 21 February. There were eight heats, with the top two finishers moving on to the quarterfinals. In heat 5, the Netherlands' Anke Jannie Landman was advanced to the quarterfinals and China's Wang Chunlu was disqualified.

Heat 1

Rank	Athlete	Country	Time	Notes
1	Ikue Teshigawara	Japan	1:35.964	Q
2	Marinella Canclini	Italy	1:35.971	Q
3	Erin Gleason	United States	1:36.965	
4	Janet Daly	Australia	1:59.990	

Heat 2

Rank	Athlete	Country	Time	Notes
1	Yang Yang (S)	China	1:35.244	Q
2	Sachi Ozawa	Japan	1:35.275	Q
3	Daniela Vlaeva	Bulgaria	1:37.124	
4	Erin Porter	United States	1:52.939	

Heat 3

Rank	Athlete	Country	Time	Notes
1	Isabelle Charest	Canada	1:39.729	Q
2	Chikage Tanaka	Japan	1:39.822	Q
3	Katia Colturi	Italy	1:39.937	

Heat 4

Rank	Athlete	Country	Time	Notes
1	Kim Yun-mi	South Korea	1:39.042	Q
2	Annie Perreault	Canada	1:39.128	Q
3	Mara Urbani	Italy	1:39.231	
–	Marina Pylayeva	Russia	1:39.340	

Heat 5

Rank	Athlete	Country	Time	Notes
1	Amy Peterson	United States	1:33.530	Q OR
2	Han Ryon-hui	North Korea	1:34.493	Q
3	Anke Jannie Landman	Netherlands	2:08.819	ADV
–	Wang Chunlu	China	DSQ	

Heat 6

Rank	Athlete	Country	Time	Notes
1	Yang Yang (A)	China	1:37.062	Q
2	Ellen Wiegers	Netherlands	1:37.775	Q
3	Susanne Busch	Germany	1:38.379	
4	Yelena Tikhanina	Russia	1:39.242	

Heat 7

Rank	Athlete	Country	Time	Notes
1	Chun Lee-kyung	South Korea	1:39.107	Q
2	Evgeniya Radanova	Bulgaria	1:39.279	Q
3	Tania Vicent	Canada	1:40.293	
–	Jong Ok-myong	North Korea	DSQ	

Heat 8

Rank	Athlete	Country	Time	Notes
1	Won Hye-kyung	South Korea	1:44.005	Q
2	Ho Jong-hae	North Korea	1:44.256	Q
3	Yvonne Kunze	Germany	1:44.870	
4	Nataliya Sverchikova	Ukraine	1:45.279	

=== Quarterfinals ===
The quarterfinals were held on 21 February. The top two finishers in each of the four quarterfinals advanced to the semifinals.

Quarterfinal 1

Rank	Athlete	Country	Time	Notes
1	Yang Yang (A)	China	1:31.991	Q WR
2	Kim Yun-mi	South Korea	1:32.097	Q
3	Anke Jannie Landman	Netherlands	1:32.939	
4	Han Ryon-hui	North Korea	1:34.405	
5	Annie Perreault	Canada	1:35.302	

Quarterfinal 2

Rank	Athlete	Country	Time	Notes
1	Chun Lee-kyung	South Korea	1:38.068	Q
2	Ikue Teshigawara	Japan	1:38.446	Q
3	Evgeniya Radanova	Bulgaria	1:38.510	
4	Marinella Canclini	Italy	1:38.517	

Quarterfinal 3

Rank	Athlete	Country	Time	Notes
1	Yang Yang (S)	China	1:35.244	Q
2	Isabelle Charest	Canada	1:37.200	Q
3	Sachi Ozawa	Japan	1:37.493	
4	Ho Jong-hae	North Korea	1:38.546	

Quarterfinal 4

Rank	Athlete	Country	Time	Notes
1	Won Hye-kyung	South Korea	1:36.210	Q
2	Amy Peterson	United States	1:36.274	Q
3	Ellen Wiegers	Netherlands	1:36.343	
4	Chikage Tanaka	Japan	1:36.570	

=== Semifinals ===
The semifinals were held on 21 February. The top two finishers in each of the two semifinals qualified for the A final, while the third and fourth place skaters advanced to the B Final.

Semifinal 1

Rank	Athlete	Country	Time	Notes
1	Won Hye-kyung	South Korea	1:35.606	QA
2	Yang Yang (S)	China	1:35.721	QA
3	Isabelle Charest	Canada	1:35.741	QB
4	Kim Yun-mi	South Korea	1:38.420	QB

Semifinal 2

Rank	Athlete	Country	Time	Notes
1	Yang Yang (A)	China	1:34.688	QA
2	Chun Lee-kyung	South Korea	1:34.789	QA
3	Ikue Teshigawara	Japan	1:35.266	QB
4	Amy Peterson	United States	1:35.644	QB

=== Finals ===
The four qualifying skaters competed in Final A, while four others raced for 5th place in Final B.

Final A

Rank	Athlete	Country	Time	Notes
1st place, gold medalist(s)	Chun Lee-kyung	South Korea	1:42.776	
2nd place, silver medalist(s)	Yang Yang (S)	China	1:43.343	
3rd place, bronze medalist(s)	Won Hye-kyung	South Korea	1:43.361	
–	Yang Yang (A)	China	DSQ	

Final B

Rank	Athlete	Country	Time	Notes
4	Amy Peterson	United States	1:37.348	
5	Ikue Teshigawara	Japan	1:37.693	
6	Kim Yun-mi	South Korea	1:37.777	
7	Isabelle Charest	Canada	1:37.813	
