= Ukraine at the 1995 Winter Universiade =

- IOC code: UKR
- NOC: Sports Student Union of Ukraine
- Website: osvitasport.org

in Jaca, Spain 18 February 1995 – 26 February 1995
- Medals Ranked 18th: Gold 0 Silver 0 Bronze 4 Total 4

Winter Universiade appearances (overview)
- 1993; 1995; 1997; 1999; 2001; 2003; 2005; 2007; 2009; 2011; 2013; 2015; 2017; 2019; 2023; 2025

Ukraine competed at the 1995 Winter Universiade in Jaca, Spain. Ukraine won 4 medals, all of which were bronze.

== Medallists ==
Medal	Name	Sport	Event
Bronze	Mykola Popovych	Cross-country skiing	Men's 30 km mass start
Bronze	Anna Slipenko	Cross-country skiing	Women's 10 km classical
Bronze	Mykola Popovych; Oleksandr Zarovniy; Hennadiy Nykon; Oleksandr Vashchenko	Cross-country skiing	Men's relay
Bronze	Anna Slipenko; Valentyna Shevchenko; Olena Otroshko	Cross-country skiing	Women's relay

== See also ==
- Ukraine at the 1995 Summer Universiade

== Sources ==
- Results
