= Ukraine at the 2001 Winter Universiade =

- IOC code: UKR
- NOC: Sports Students Union of Ukraine
- Website: osvitasport.org

in Zakopane, Poland 7 February 2001 – 17 February 2001
- Competitors: 115
- Medals Ranked 11th: Gold 1 Silver 1 Bronze 2 Total 4

Winter Universiade appearances (overview)
- 1993; 1995; 1997; 1999; 2001; 2003; 2005; 2007; 2009; 2011; 2013; 2015; 2017; 2019; 2023; 2025

Ukraine competed at the 2001 Winter Universiade in Zakopane, Poland. Ukraine won 4 medals: one gold, one silver, and two bronze medals.

== Medallists ==
Medal	Name	Sport	Event
Gold	Elena Grushina; Ruslan Goncharov	Figure skating	Ice dancing
Silver	Roman Leybyuk; Oleksandr Zarovniy; Volodymyr Olshanskiy; Volodymyr Ivanov	Cross-country skiing	Men's relay
Bronze	Oksana Khvostenko; Oksana Yakovleva; Tetiana Rud	Biathlon	Women's relay
Bronze	Oleksandr Fedorov; Denys Pashinskyi; Vasyl Polonitskyi; Oleksiy Bernatskyi; Serhiy Kharchenko; Rostyslav Sahlo; Oleksandr Bobkin; Oleksandr Panchenko; Yuriy Diachenko; Oleksandr Mikhanov; Volodymyr Dehtiarenko; Viacheslav Kulikov; Artem Bondarev; Oleh Shafarenko; Andriy Voiush; Oleksandr Pobedonostsev; Denys Isayenko; Serhiy Rublevskyi; Pavlo Homernik; Yuriy Liaskovskyi; Andriy Butochnev; Roman Shcherbatiuk	Ice hockey	Men's team

== Figure skating ==
Athlete	Event	Rank
Oleksandr Smokvin	Men's singles	16
Iryna Lukianenko	Ladies' singles	9
Olena Hrushyna; Ruslan Honcharov	Ice dance	1st place, gold medalist(s)
Yuliia Holovina; Oleh Voyko	Ice dance	7
Mariana Kozlova; Serhiy Baranov	Ice dance	15

== See also ==
- Ukraine at the 2001 Summer Universiade

== Sources ==
- Results in figure skating
