= Short-track speed skating at the 1998 Winter Olympics – Women's 500 metres =

Women's 500 metres at the XVIII Olympic Winter Games
- Pictogram for short track
- Venue: White Ring
- Dates: 19 February 1998
- Competitors: 32 from 13 nations
- Winning time: 46.568

Medalists
1st place, gold medalist(s)		Annie Perreault	Canada
2nd place, silver medalist(s)		Yang Yang (S)	China
3rd place, bronze medalist(s)		Chun Lee-Kyung	South Korea

The women's 500 metres in short track speed skating at the 1998 Winter Olympics took place on 19 February at the White Ring. It featured an uncommon occurrence, as two finalists failed to finish (one was disqualified), meaning that the winner of the B Final, Chun Lee-kyung, won a bronze medal. A consequence of this is that Chun actually recorded a faster time in the final than the two women who won medals ahead of her.

== Results ==
=== Heats ===
The first round was held on 19 February. There were eight heats, with the top two finishers moving on to the quarterfinals.

Heat 1

Rank	Athlete	Country	Time	Notes
1	Chikage Tanaka	Japan	46.768	Q
2	Jong Ok-myong	North Korea	46.835	Q
3	Yvonne Kunze	Germany	46.887	
4	Erin Porter	United States	64.113	

Heat 2

Rank	Athlete	Country	Time	Notes
1	Chun Lee-kyung	South Korea	48.024	Q
2	Erin Gleason	United States	48.767	Q
3	Ellen Wiegers	Netherlands	56.250	
4	Tania Vicent	Canada	70.212	

Heat 3

Rank	Athlete	Country	Time	Notes
1	Wang Chunlu	China	45.655	Q OR
2	Annie Perreault	Canada	45.866	Q
3	Barbara Baldissera	Italy	46.113	
–	Han Ryon-hui	North Korea	DNF	

Heat 4

Rank	Athlete	Country	Time	Notes
1	Ikue Teshigawara	Japan	47.354	Q
2	Kim Yun-mi	South Korea	48.184	Q
3	Melanie de Lange	Netherlands	48.598	
4	Susanne Busch	Germany	90.607	

Heat 5

Rank	Athlete	Country	Time	Notes
1	Yang Yang (A)	China	46.815	Q
2	Yelena Tikhanina	Russia	46.980	Q
3	Hwang Ok-sil	North Korea	46.987	
4	Anke Jannie Landman	Netherlands	47.090	

Heat 6

Rank	Athlete	Country	Time	Notes
1	Evgeniya Radanova	Bulgaria	45.977	Q
2	Choi Min-kyung	South Korea	46.126	Q
3	Nataliya Sverchikova	Ukraine	46.976	
4	Marinella Canclini	Italy	74.224	

Heat 7

Rank	Athlete	Country	Time	Notes
1	Yang Yang (S)	China	46.136	Q
2	Mara Urbani	Italy	46.287	Q
3	Amy Peterson	United States	46.764	
4	Janet Daly	Australia	49.158	

Heat 8

Rank	Athlete	Country	Time	Notes
1	Isabelle Charest	Canada	46.085	Q
2	Marina Pylayeva	Russia	46.359	Q
3	Daniela Vlaeva	Bulgaria	46.681	
4	Ayako Tsubaki	Japan	46.950	

=== Quarterfinals ===
The top two finishers in each of the four quarterfinals advanced to the semifinals. In quarterfinal 2, Japan's Chikage Tanaka was advanced, and North Korea's Jong Ok-myong disqualified. In quarterfinal 3, Japan's Ikue Teshigawara was advanced and Bulgaria's Evgeniya Radanova disqualified.

Quarterfinal 1

Rank	Athlete	Country	Time	Notes
1	Choi Min-kyung	South Korea	46.033	Q
2	Isabelle Charest	Canada	46.194	Q
3	Yelena Tikhanina	Russia	46.206	
–	Yang Yang (A)	China	DQ	

Quarterfinal 2

Rank	Athlete	Country	Time	Notes
1	Annie Perreault	Canada	46.421	Q
2	Yang Yang (S)	China	46.578	Q
3	Chikage Tanaka	Japan	56.798	ADV
–	Jong Ok-myong	North Korea	DQ	

Quarterfinal 3

Rank	Athlete	Country	Time	Notes
1	Mara Urbani	Italy	46.215	Q
2	Kim Yun-mi	South Korea	46.640	Q
3	Ikue Teshigawara	Japan	52.693	ADV
–	Evgeniya Radanova	Bulgaria	DQ	

Quarterfinal 4

Rank	Athlete	Country	Time	Notes
1	Wang Chunlu	China	46.091	Q
2	Chun Lee-kyung	South Korea	46.163	Q
3	Marina Pylayeva	Russia	46.220	
4	Erin Gleason	United States	46.425	

=== Semifinals ===
The top two finishers in each of the two semifinals qualified for the A final, while the third and fourth place skaters advanced to the B Final.

Semifinal 1

Rank	Athlete	Country	Time	Notes
1	Isabelle Charest	Canada	44.991	QA OR
2	Yang Yang (S)	China	45.101	QA
3	Choi Min-kyung	South Korea	46.000	QB
4	Mara Urbani	Italy	46.473	QB
5	Chikage Tanaka	Japan	46.497	

Semifinal 2

Rank	Athlete	Country	Time	Notes
1	Annie Perreault	Canada	45.612	QA
2	Wang Chunlu	China	45.655	QA
3	Ikue Teshigawara	Japan	45.736	QB
4	Chun Lee-kyung	South Korea	46.168	QB
5	Kim Yun-mi	South Korea	47.337	

=== Finals ===
The four qualifying skaters competed in Final A, while four others raced for 5th place in Final B. The disqualification of Isabelle Charest and Wang Chunlu's failure to finish resulted in the bronze medal being awarded to the winner of Final B.

Final A

Rank	Athlete	Country	Time	Notes
1st place, gold medalist(s)	Annie Perreault	Canada	46.568	
2nd place, silver medalist(s)	Yang Yang (S)	China	46.627	
–	Isabelle Charest	Canada	DQ	
–	Wang Chunlu	China	DNF	

Final B

Rank	Athlete	Country	Time	Notes
3rd place, bronze medalist(s)	Chun Lee-kyung	South Korea	46.335	
4	Choi Min-kyung	South Korea	46.504	
5	Mara Urbani	Italy	46.687	
6	Ikue Teshigawara	Japan	46.889	
