= Ukraine at the 1997 Winter Universiade =

- IOC code: UKR
- NOC: Sports Students Union of Ukraine
- Website: osvitasport.org

in Muju and Chonju, South Korea 24 January 1997 – 2 February 1997
- Competitors: 24
- Medals Ranked 15th: Gold 0 Silver 2 Bronze 2 Total 4

Winter Universiade appearances (overview)
- 1993; 1995; 1997; 1999; 2001; 2003; 2005; 2007; 2009; 2011; 2013; 2015; 2017; 2019; 2023; 2025

Ukraine competed at the 1997 Winter Universiade in Muju and Chonju, South Korea. Ukraine won 4 medals: two silver and two bronze medals.

== Medallists ==
Medal	Name	Sport	Event
Silver	Oleksandr Lysenko; Oleksandr Bilanenko; Oleksandr Prymak; Kyrylo Kolupayev	Biathlon	Men's relay
Silver	Nina Stenkova; Natalia Tereshchenko; Tetiana Rud	Biathlon	Women's relay
Bronze	Mykola Popovych	Cross-country skiing	Men's 30 km mass start
Bronze	Ihor Spivak; Hennadiy Nykon; Volodymyr Olshanskiy; Mykola Popovych	Cross-country skiing	Men's relay

== Alpine skiing ==
Ukrainians did not compete in alpine skiing.

== Figure skating ==
Athlete	Event	Rank
Yevhen Martynov	Men's singles	11

== See also ==
- Ukraine at the 1997 Summer Universiade

== Sources ==
- Results
