= Luge at the 1998 Winter Olympics – Doubles =

Doubles at the XVIII Olympic Winter Games
- Venue: Spiral
- Dates: 13 February 1998
- Competitors: 34 from 11 nations
- Winning time: 1:41.105

Medalists
1st place, gold medalist(s)		Germany; Stefan Krauße, Jan Behrendt
2nd place, silver medalist(s)		United States; Chris Thorpe, Gordy Sheer
3rd place, bronze medalist(s)		United States; Mark Grimmette, Brian Martin

The Doubles luge competition at the 1998 Winter Olympics in Nagano was held on 13 February, at Spiral.

== Results ==
Rank	Athletes	Country	Run 1	Run 2	Total
1st place, gold medalist(s)	Stefan Krauße; Jan Behrendt	Germany	50.592	50.513	1:41.105
2nd place, silver medalist(s)	Chris Thorpe; Gordy Sheer	United States	50.634	50.493	1:41.127
3rd place, bronze medalist(s)	Mark Grimmette; Brian Martin	United States	50.716	50.501	1:41.217
4	Tobias Schiegl; Markus Schiegl	Austria	50.846	50.575	1:41.421
5	Kurt Brugger; Wilfried Huber	Italy	50.897	50.871	1:41.768
6	Gerhard Plankensteiner; Oswald Haselrieder	Italy	51.084	50.833	1:41.917
7	Ihor Urbanskiy; Andriy Mukhin	Ukraine	51.262	50.706	1:41.968
8	Steffen Skel; Steffen Wöller	Germany	51.408	50.816	1:42.224
9	Danil Chaban; Viktor Kneyb	Russia	51.370	51.023	1:42.393
10	Albert Demchenko; Semyon Kolobayev	Russia	51.515	51.041	1:42.556
11	Oleh Avdieiev; Danylo Panchenko	Ukraine	51.413	51.275	1:42.688
12	Anders Söderberg; Bengt Walden	Sweden	51.725	51.137	1:42.862
13	Roberts Suharevs; Dairis Leksis	Latvia	51.281	51.970	1:43.251
14	Atsushi Sasaki; Kei Takahashi	Japan	51.541	51.835	1:43.376
15	Piotr Orslowski; Robert Mieszała	Poland	52.062	51.445	1:43.507
16	Ion Cristian Stanciu; Liviu Cepoi	Romania	52.289	52.986	1:45.275
17	Juris Vovčoks; Māris Lēģeris	Latvia	53.969	52.586	1:46.555
