= Ukraine at the 2025 Winter World University Games =

- IOC code: UKR
- NOC: Sports Students Union of Ukraine
- Website: studsport.com.ua

in Turin, Italy 13 January 2025 – 23 January 2025
- Competitors: 52 in 7 sports
- Medals Ranked 10th: Gold 4 Silver 4 Bronze 4 Total 12

Winter Universiade appearances (overview)
- 1993; 1995; 1997; 1999; 2001; 2003; 2005; 2007; 2009; 2011; 2013; 2015; 2017; 2019; 2023; 2025

Ukraine competed at the 2025 Winter World University Games in Turin, Italy, from 13 to 23 January 2025. The team won 12 medals and finished 10th. This marked the best result since the 2011 Winter Universiade, when Ukraine won 15 medals including 6 golds and finished 3rd. Ukraine debuted in curling and won its first Universiade medals in freestyle skiing.

== Competitors ==
At the Games, 52 Ukrainian athletes took part. Ukrainians did not compete in cross-country skiing, para alpine skiing, para cross-country skiing, short track speed skating, ski mountaineering, and ski orienteering. The team included one Olympian (Anastasiya Shepilenko).

Sport	Men	Women	Total
Alpine skiing	2	1	3
Biathlon	5	4	9
Curling	5	—	5
Figure skating	2	2	4
Freestyle skiing	2	1	3
Ice hockey	21	—	21
Snowboarding	6	1	7
Total	43	9	52

List of Ukrainian athletes at the 2025 Winter World University Games
Athlete	Date of birth	Sport	University	Sex
Yevhenii Abadzhian	8 July 2001	Ice hockey	Kharkiv State Academy of Physical Culture	M
Rasim Abdullaiev	29 August 2002	Ice hockey	Kharkiv National Academy of Urban Economy	M
Mariia Aniichyn	28 August 2007	Freestyle skiing	Vasyl Stefanyk Precarpathian National University	F
Sviatoslav Bazhan	25 February 2007	Snowboarding	Ivano-Frankivsk College of Physical Education	M
Nestor Bilous	13 August 2005	Snowboarding	Ivano-Frankivsk College of Physical Education	M
Oleh Boiko	4 April 2003	Freestyle skiing	National University of Ukraine on Physical Education and Sport	M
Bohdan Borkovskyi	18 April 2004	Biathlon	Sumy State University	M
Denys Borodai	10 July 2002	Ice hockey	Kharkiv State Academy of Physical Culture	M
Roman Borovyk	28 January 2000	Biathlon	Hlukhiv National Pedagogical University of Oleksandr Dovzhenko	M
Vladyslav Braha	4 September 2001	Ice hockey	National University of Ukraine on Physical Education and Sport	M
Daryna Chalyk	19 August 2001	Biathlon	Chernihiv State T.G. Shevchenko Pedagogical Institute	F
Vladyslav Chykhar	16 April 2002	Biathlon	Sumy State University	M
Oleksandr Filimonov	28 November 2002	Ice hockey	Kharkiv State Academy of Physical Culture	M
Anastasia Gozhva	5 December 2001	Figure skating	Taras Shevchenko National University of Kyiv	F
Artem Hasynets	6 November 2004	Curling	National University of Ukraine on Physical Education and Sport	M
Artem Hrebenyk	28 June 2002	Ice hockey	Kharkiv State Academy of Physical Culture	M
Mykhailo Kabaliuk	12 May 2005	Snowboarding	Ivano-Frankivsk College of Physical Education	M
Zakhar Kasatonov	7 July 2005	Ice hockey	Kharkiv National University of Radioelectronics	M
Stepan Kinash	5 February 2002	Biathlon	Kharkiv State Academy of Physical Culture	M
Dmytro Kobylnyk	5 July 2002	Ice hockey	Prydniprovsk State Academy of Physical Culture and Sport	M
Vladyslav Koval	20 July 2004	Curling	Odesa National Polytechnic University	M
Hlib Krivoshapkin	10 May 2000	Ice hockey	National University of Ukraine on Physical Education and Sport	M
Nikita Kruhliakov	9 November 2001	Ice hockey	Kherson State Agrarian University	M
Illia Kryklia	1 October 2004	Ice hockey	National University of Ukraine on Physical Education and Sport	M
Andrii Kryvonozhkin	8 February 2003	Ice hockey	National Aerospace University – Kharkiv Aviation Institute	M
Danylo Makarenko	3 April 2001	Ice hockey	Prydniprovsk State Academy of Physical Culture and Sport	M
Ivan Malovannyi	9 October 2003	Snowboarding	National University of Ukraine on Physical Education and Sport	M
Kyrylo Marsak	7 September 2004	Figure skating	National University of Ukraine on Physical Education and Sport	M
Oleksandra Merkushyna	14 January 2005	Biathlon	Kharkiv State Academy of Physical Culture	F
Hlib Mostovenko	8 September 2001	Snowboarding	Bogomolets National Medical University	M
Eduard Nikolov	10 August 2003	Curling	National University of Ukraine on Physical Education and Sport	M
Oleksandr Patsahan	26 January 2006	Alpine skiing	Lviv State University of Physical Culture	M
Eleonora Pavliuk	10 May 2005	Snowboarding	National University Odesa Law Academy	F
Mariia Pinchuk	7 April 2006	Figure skating	Kharkiv State Academy of Physical Culture	F
Mykyta Pogorielov	24 September 2002	Figure skating	Kharkiv State Academy of Physical Culture	M
Serhii Poimanov	21 May 2002	Ice hockey	Kharkiv State Academy of Physical Culture	M
Artem Portnoi	5 March 2003	Ice hockey	Ukrainian Academy of Customs	M
Oleksandr Popadych	27 September 2006	Snowboarding	Vasyl Stefanyk Precarpathian National University	M
Kseniia Prykhodko	6 February 2005	Biathlon	Sumy State University	F
Tymofii Savytskyi	31 May 2003	Ice hockey	Prydniprovsk State Academy of Physical Culture and Sport	M
Yaroslav Shchur	16 April 2003	Curling	National University of Ukraine on Physical Education and Sport	M
Anastasiya Shepilenko	9 October 2000	Alpine skiing	Lviv State University of Physical Culture	F
Dmytro Shepiuk	2 November 2005	Alpine skiing	Uzhhorod National University	M
Liliia Steblyna	1 May 2000	Biathlon	National University of Ukraine on Physical Education and Sport	F
Danylo Stepaniuk	29 October 2002	Freestyle skiing	International University of Economics and Humanities	M
Serhii Stetsiura	18 July 2004	Ice hockey	Hryhorii Skovoroda University in Pereiaslav	M
Artem Suhak	16 December 2003	Curling	National University of Ukraine on Physical Education and Sport	M
Serhii Suprun	28 December 2003	Biathlon	Sumy State University	M
Mykyta Sydorenko	13 September 2004	Ice hockey	Kharkiv State Academy of Physical Culture	M
Artem Tselohorodtsev	9 November 2001	Ice hockey	Kharkiv State Academy of Physical Culture	M
Hlib Varava	19 April 2002	Ice hockey	Hryhorii Skovoroda University in Pereiaslav	M
Oleksandr Zaruba	19 May 2005	Ice hockey	State Biotechnological University	M

== Medalists ==
Medal	Name	Sport	Event	Date
Gold	Bohdan Borkovskyi	Biathlon	Men's short individual	January 14
Gold	Oleksandra Merkushyna; Serhii Suprun	Biathlon	Single mixed relay	January 16
Gold	Bohdan Borkovskyi	Biathlon	Men's pursuit	January 20
Gold	Daryna Chalyk	Biathlon	Women's mass start	January 22
Silver	Oleh Boiko	Freestyle skiing	Men's big air	January 19
Silver	Mariia Aniichyn	Freestyle skiing	Women's big air	January 19
Silver	Serhii Suprun	Biathlon	Men's pursuit	January 20
Silver	Oleksandra Merkushyna	Biathlon	Women's mass start	January 22
Bronze	Daryna Chalyk	Biathlon	Women's short individual	January 14
Bronze	Bohdan Borkovskyi	Biathlon	Men's sprint	January 19
Bronze	Daryna Chalyk	Biathlon	Women's pursuit	January 20
Bronze	Yevhenii Abadzhian; Rasim Abdullaiev; Denys Borodai; Vladyslav Braha; Oleksandr Filimonov; Artem Hrebenyk; Zakhar Kasatonov; Dmytro Kobylnyk; Hlib Krivoshapkin; Nikita Kruhliakov; Illia Kryklia; Andrii Kryvonozhkin; Danylo Makarenko; Serhii Poimanov; Artem Portnoi; Tymofii Savytskyi; Serhii Stetsiura; Mykyta Sydorenko; Artem Tselohorodtsev; Hlib Varava; Oleksandr Zaruba	Ice hockey	Men	January 22

Medals by sport
Sport	1st place, gold medalist(s)	2nd place, silver medalist(s)	3rd place, bronze medalist(s)	Total
Biathlon	4	2	3	9
Freestyle skiing	0	2	0	2
Ice hockey	0	0	1	1

== Alpine skiing ==
Anastasiya Shepilenko competed at her second Winter World University Games.

Men

Athlete	Event	Run 1		Run 2		Total	
Athlete	Event	Time	Rank	Time	Rank	Time	Rank
Dmytro Shepiuk	Combined	1:01.95	40	43.51	35	1:45.46	35
Dmytro Shepiuk	Super-G	—N/a				1:00.75	32
Dmytro Shepiuk	Giant slalom	1:06.90	60	1:08.23	58	2:15.13	55
Dmytro Shepiuk	Slalom	DNF1					
Oleksandr Patsahan	Combined	1:06.03	51	DSQ			
Oleksandr Patsahan	Super-G	—N/a				1:06.81	44
Oleksandr Patsahan	Giant slalom	1:10.06	78	1:10.99	68	2:21.05	68
Oleksandr Patsahan	Slalom	DNF1					

Women

Athlete	Event	Run 1		Run 2		Total	
Athlete	Event	Time	Rank	Time	Rank	Time	Rank
Anastasiya Shepilenko	Combined	1:02.76	=11	51.62	5	1:54.38	7
Anastasiya Shepilenko	Super-G	—N/a				1:02.73	=7
Anastasiya Shepilenko	Giant slalom	1:05.27	12	1:04.14	8	2:09.41	8

== Biathlon ==
Being fifth-largest team at the Games, Ukraine became the most successful one in biathlon. Stepan Kinash, Vladyslav Chykhar, Roman Borovyk, and Liliia Steblyna competed at their second Winter World University Games.

Men

Athlete	Event	Time	Misses	Rank
Bohdan Borkovskyi	Short individual	38:40.9	3 (0+0+1+2)	1st place, gold medalist(s)
Bohdan Borkovskyi	Sprint	23:39.7	1 (0+1)	3rd place, bronze medalist(s)
Bohdan Borkovskyi	Pursuit	37:48.9	4 (0+2+1+1)	1st place, gold medalist(s)
Serhii Suprun	Short individual	39:31.1	2 (0+1+0+1)	4
Serhii Suprun	Sprint	23:59.6	0 (0+0)	6
Serhii Suprun	Pursuit	38:17.8	4 (0+0+2+2)	2nd place, silver medalist(s)
Vladyslav Chykhar	Short individual	39:58.9	3 (1+1+0+1)	5
Vladyslav Chykhar	Sprint	25:50.6	2 (1+1)	26
Vladyslav Chykhar	Pursuit	DNS		
Roman Borovyk	Short individual	41:52.3	5 (1+2+1+1)	16
Roman Borovyk	Sprint	24:19.4	1 (1+0)	10
Roman Borovyk	Pursuit	41:05.4	6 (1+2+3+0)	14
Roman Borovyk	Mass start	44:47.7	7 (1+1+3+2)	11
Stepan Kinash	Short individual	42:21.1	4 (0+1+1+2)	20
Stepan Kinash	Sprint	DNS		
Stepan Kinash	Mass start	45:22.2	4 (0+1+0+3)	14

Women

Athlete	Event	Time	Misses	Rank
Daryna Chalyk	Short individual	39:04.2	4 (1+0+2+1)	3rd place, bronze medalist(s)
Daryna Chalyk	Sprint	24:15.4	5 (3+2)	9
Daryna Chalyk	Pursuit	38:38.3	5 (0+1+3+1)	3rd place, bronze medalist(s)
Daryna Chalyk	Mass start	41:46.6	3 (1+1+1+0)	1st place, gold medalist(s)
Oleksandra Merkushyna	Short individual	DNS		
Oleksandra Merkushyna	Sprint	23:45.9	3 (1+2)	5
Oleksandra Merkushyna	Pursuit	38:59.0	4 (1+1+0+2)	4
Oleksandra Merkushyna	Mass start	42:25.5	2 (1+0+0+1)	2nd place, silver medalist(s)
Liliia Steblyna	Short individual	40:29.2	6 (2+2+1+1)	10
Liliia Steblyna	Sprint	25:45.0	7 (4+3)	23
Liliia Steblyna	Pursuit	42:06.7	7 (1+2+2+2)	15
Liliia Steblyna	Mass start	45:44.4	8 (1+3+1+3)	15
Kseniia Prykhodko	Short individual	DNS		
Kseniia Prykhodko	Sprint	DNS		

Mixed

Athlete	Event	Time	Misses	Rank
Oleksandra Merkushyna; Serhii Suprun	Single mixed relay	39:52.5	0+8	1st place, gold medalist(s)

== Curling ==
Ukraine debuted in the sport at Winter World University Games. In the round robin, Ukraine finished 8th out of 10 team ahead of Great Britain and China.

Summary

Team	Event	Group stage										Semifinal	Final / BM	
Team	Event	Opposition Score	Opposition Score	Opposition Score	Opposition Score	Opposition Score	Opposition Score	Opposition Score	Opposition Score	Opposition Score	Rank	Opposition Score	Opposition Score	Rank
Eduard Nikolov; Yaroslav Shchur; Artem Suhak; Vladyslav Koval; Artem Hasynets	Men's tournament	Sweden; L 4–7	Great Britain; L 6–8	South Korea; W 6–5	Italy; L 1–7	Norway; L 6–8	Switzerland; W 7–5	United States; L 4–6	Canada; L 1–7	China; W 6–3	8	Did not advance		

== Figure skating ==
Anastasia Hozhva competed at her second Winter World University Games.

Athlete	Event	SP		FS		Total	
Athlete	Event	Points	Rank	Points	Rank	Points	Rank
Kyrylo Marsak	Men's singles	55.58	25	Did not advance			
Anastasia Hozhva	Women's singles	43.52	19 Q	90.85	16	134.37	19
Mariia Pinchuk; Mykyta Pogorielov	Ice dance	61.39	4	94.13	4	155.52	4

== Freestyle skiing ==
Ukraine won its first ever medals in freestyle skiing at the Winter Universiades.

Slopestyle

Athlete	Event	Qualification				Final			
Athlete	Event	Run 1	Run 2	Best	Rank	Run 1	Run 2	Best	Rank
Oleh Boiko	Men's	~~67.50~~	68.75	68.75	8 Q	60.00	~~DNI~~	60.00	8
Danylo Stepaniuk	Men's	~~17.75~~	53.25	53.25	11 Q	36.25	~~DNI~~	36.25	11
Mariia Aniichyn	Women's	85.25	~~DNI~~	85.25	3 Q	79.00	~~DNI~~	79.00	5
Anastasiia Melnyk	Women's	~~45.00~~	52.50	52.50	8	Did not advance			

Big Air

Athlete	Event	Qualification				Final			
Athlete	Event	Run 1	Run 2	Best	Rank	Run 1	Run 2	Best	Rank
Oleh Boiko	Men's	~~68.25~~	80.75	80.75	5 Q	86.00	~~DNI~~	86.00	2nd place, silver medalist(s)
Danylo Stepaniuk	Men's	~~8.25~~	40.00	40.00	12 Q	~~33.25~~	82.00	82.00	4
Mariia Aniichyn	Women's	~~13.75~~	75.50	75.50	2 Q	~~87.00~~	89.25	89.25	2nd place, silver medalist(s)
Anastasiia Melnyk	Women's	65.50	~~DNI~~	65.50	7	Did not advance			

== Ice hockey ==
Denys Borodai, Artem Hrebenyk, Hlib Kryvoshapkin, Artem Tselohorodtsev, and Hlib Varava played at their second Winter World University Games. Ukraine won its first medal in ice hockey since 2001.

Team roster

Head coach: Artem Gnidenko

No.	Pos.	Name	Height	Weight	Birthdate	Team
21	F	Yevhenii Abadzhian	183 cm (6 ft 0 in)	94 kg (207 lb)	8 July 2001 (aged 23)	(Ukraine) HK Kremenchuk
15	D	Rasim Abdullaiev	183 cm (6 ft 0 in)	78 kg (172 lb)	29 August 2002 (aged 22)	(Ukraine) HK Kremenchuk
19	F	Hlib Krivoshapkin (C)	180 cm (5 ft 11 in)	80 kg (180 lb)	10 May 2000 (aged 24)	(Ukraine) HK Kremenchuk
23	F	Denys Borodai (A)	188 cm (6 ft 2 in)	85 kg (187 lb)	10 July 2002 (aged 22)	(Ukraine) Sokil Kyiv
6	F	Vladyslav Braha	182 cm (6 ft 0 in)	83 kg (183 lb)	4 September 2001 (aged 23)	(Ukraine) HK Kremenchuk
4	D	Oleksandr Filimonov	183 cm (6 ft 0 in)	83 kg (183 lb)	28 November 2002 (aged 22)	(Ukraine) Sokil Kyiv
3	D	Artem Hrebenyk	181 cm (5 ft 11 in)	83 kg (183 lb)	28 June 2002 (aged 22)	(France) Mont-Blanc
25	GK	Zakhar Kasatonov	186 cm (6 ft 1 in)	78 kg (172 lb)	7 July 2005 (aged 19)	(Ukraine) HC Kharkiv Berserks
11	D	Dmytro Kobylnyk	191 cm (6 ft 3 in)	77 kg (170 lb)	5 July 2002 (aged 22)	(Ukraine) HC Storm Odessa
8	D	Nikita Kruhliakov	190 cm (6 ft 3 in)	90 kg (200 lb)	9 November 2001 (aged 23)	(Ukraine) HK Kremenchuk
10	F	Illia Kryklia	180 cm (5 ft 11 in)	70 kg (150 lb)	1 October 2004 (aged 20)	(Ukraine) HC Storm Odessa
24	F	Andrii Kryvonozhkin	195 cm (6 ft 5 in)	110 kg (240 lb)	28 February 2003 (aged 21)	(Ukraine) HC Kyiv Capitals
20	GK	Danylo Makarenko	182 cm (6 ft 0 in)	76 kg (168 lb)	3 April 2001 (aged 23)	(Ukraine) HC Kryzhynka Kyiv
9	F	Serhii Poimanov	180 cm (5 ft 11 in)	77 kg (170 lb)	21 May 2002 (aged 22)	(Ukraine) HC Storm Odessa
13	D	Artem Portnoi	173 cm (5 ft 8 in)	73 kg (161 lb)	5 March 2003 (aged 21)	(Ukraine) HC Storm Odessa
7	D	Hlib Varava (A)	184 cm (6 ft 0 in)	88 kg (194 lb)	19 April 2002 (aged 22)	(Ukraine) HC Storm Odessa
5	F	Tymofii Savytskyi	185 cm (6 ft 1 in)	73 kg (161 lb)	31 May 2003 (aged 21)	(Ukraine) Sokil Kyiv
12	F	Serhii Stetsiura	181 cm (5 ft 11 in)	76 kg (168 lb)	18 July 2004 (aged 20)	(Ukraine) HC Storm Odessa
22	F	Mykyta Sydorenko	188 cm (6 ft 2 in)	82 kg (181 lb)	13 September 2004 (aged 20)	(Ukraine) HC Storm Odessa
18	F	Artem Tselohorodtsev	187 cm (6 ft 2 in)	84 kg (185 lb)	9 November 2001 (aged 23)	(Ukraine) HK Kremenchuk
16	D	Oleksandr Zaruba	190 cm (6 ft 3 in)	80 kg (180 lb)	19 May 2005 (aged 19)	(Norway) Forus/Sandnes

Summary

Team	Event	Group stage					Quarterfinal	Semi-final	Final / BM	
Team	Event	Opposition Score	Opposition Score	Opposition Score	Opposition Score	Rank	Opposition Score	Opposition Score	Opposition Score	Rank
Ukraine men's team	Men's tournament	Slovakia; L 2-4	Poland; W 8-2	Japan; L 4-7	United States; L 1-5	4 Q	Czech Republic; W 4-3 OT	Slovakia; L 1-3	United States; W 5-3	3rd place, bronze medalist(s)

== Snowboarding ==
Ivan Malovannyi and Hlib Mostovenko competed at their second Winter World University Games.

Snowboard cross

Athlete	Event	Seeding		Elimination		Semifinal	Final
Athlete	Event	Time	Rank	Points	Position	Position	Rank
Ivan Malovannyi	Men's	32.54	15 Q	14	7	Did not advance	
Hlib Mostovenko	Men's	53.32	26	8	13	Did not advance	

Parallel

Athlete	Event	Qualification		Round of 16	Quarterfinal	Semifinal	Final	
Athlete	Event	Total time	Rank	Opposition Time	Opposition Time	Opposition Time	Opposition Time	Rank
Mykhailo Kabaliuk	Men's parallel giant slalom	1:13.27	16 Q	(Austria) Pink; W	(Bulgaria) Krashniak; L DSQ	Did not advance		
Mykhailo Kabaliuk	Men's parallel slalom	1:16.87	10 Q	(Italy) Dorfmann; L +1.02	Did not advance			
Oleksandr Popadych	Men's parallel giant slalom	1:12.51	14 Q	(Austria) Burgstaller; L +2.37	Did not advance			
Oleksandr Popadych	Men's parallel slalom	1:18.39	14 Q	(Bulgaria) Zamfirov; W	(Ukraine) Bilous; L +1.49	Did not advance		
Nestor Bilous	Men's parallel giant slalom	1:15.42	19	Did not advance				
Nestor Bilous	Men's parallel slalom	1:17.65	11 Q	(South Korea) Geon-ho; W	(Ukraine) Popadych; W	(Italy) Dorfmann; L +1.23	(Bulgaria) Krashniak; L DSQ	4
Sviatoslav Bazhan	Men's parallel giant slalom	1:18.80	24	Did not advance				
Sviatoslav Bazhan	Men's parallel slalom	1:21.55	19	Did not advance				
Eleonora Pavliuk	Women's parallel giant slalom	1:16.21	7 Q	(Poland) Kaciczak; L +5.24	Did not advance			
Eleonora Pavliuk	Women's parallel slalom	1:21.10	5 Q	(Poland) Piwowarczyk; W	(Austria) Kainz; L DSQ	Did not advance		
