= Shepilenko =

Shepilenko (Ukrainian: Шепіленко) is a surname. Notable people with the surname include:

- Anastasiya Shepilenko (born 2000), Ukrainian alpine skier
- Yuliya Shepilenko (born 1976), Ukrainian alpine skier
