= Ukraine at the 2003 Winter Universiade =

- IOC code: UKR
- NOC: Sports Students Union of Ukraine
- Website: osvitasport.org

in Tarvisio, Italy 16 January 2003 – 26 January 2003
- Competitors: 85
- Medals Ranked 2nd: Gold 7 Silver 4 Bronze 3 Total 14

Winter Universiade appearances (overview)
- 1993; 1995; 1997; 1999; 2001; 2003; 2005; 2007; 2009; 2011; 2013; 2015; 2017; 2019; 2023; 2025

Ukraine competed at the 2003 Winter Universiade in Tarvisio, Italy (ice hockey and ski jumping events were held in neighbouring cities of Austria). Ukraine won 14 medals, seven of which were gold, ranked 2nd by both number of gold medals and shared 2nd place with Japan and hosts Italy by the overall number of medals.

== Medallists ==
Medal	Name	Sport	Event
Gold	Valentyna Shevchenko	Cross-country skiing	Women's 15 km individual
Gold	Andriy Deryzemlya	Biathlon	Men's 10 km sprint
Gold	Andriy Deryzemlya	Biathlon	Men's 15 km mass start
Gold	Vyacheslav Derkach	Biathlon	Men's 12,5 km pursuit
Gold	Olexander Bilanenko	Biathlon	Men's 20 km individual
Gold	Oksana Khvostenko	Biathlon	Women's 10 km pursuit
Gold	Oksana Khvostenko	Biathlon	Women's 12,5 km mass start
Silver	Oleksiy Korobeinikov	Biathlon	Men's 12,5 km pursuit
Silver	Vyacheslav Derkach	Biathlon	Men's 15 km mass start
Silver	Oksana Yakovleva; Liudmyla Zakhodiak; Oksana Khvostenko	Biathlon	Women's relay
Silver	Mariana Kozlova; Serhiy Baranov	Figure skating	Ice dancing
Bronze	Andriy Deryzemlya	Biathlon	Men's 12,5 km pursuit
Bronze	Oleksiy Korobeinikov	Biathlon	Men's 20 km individual
Bronze	Olexander Bilanenko; Oleksiy Korobeinikov; Roman Pryma; Ruslan Lysenko	Biathlon	Men's relay

== Figure skating ==
Athlete	Event	Rank
Anton Kovalevski	Men's singles	5
Mariana Kozlova; Serhiy Baranov	Ice dance	2nd place, silver medalist(s)
Alla Beknazarova; Yuriy Kocherzhenko	Ice dance	4

== See also ==
- Ukraine at the 2003 Summer Universiade

== Sources ==
- Results in cross-country skiing
- Results in figure skating
