= Freestyle skiing at the 1998 Winter Olympics – Women's aerials =

Women's aerials at the XVIII Olympic Winter Games
- Venue: Iizuna Kogen Ski Area
- Dates: 18 February 1998
- Competitors: 24 from 12 nations
- Winning Score: 193.00

Medalists
1st place, gold medalist(s)		Nikki Stone	United States
2nd place, silver medalist(s)		Xu Nannan	China
3rd place, bronze medalist(s)		Colette Brand	Switzerland

The Women's aerials event in freestyle skiing at the 1998 Winter Olympics in Nagano took place from 16 to 18 February at Iizuna Kogen Ski Area.

== Results ==
=== Qualification ===
The top 12 advanced to the final.

Rank	Name	Country	Jump 1	Jump 2	Total	Notes
1	Xu Nannan	China	88.83	93.18	182.01	Q
2	Alla Tsuper	Ukraine	91.05	87.41	178.46	Q
3	Veronica Brenner	Canada	85.40	89.46	174.86	Q
4	Nikki Stone	United States	78.10	95.90	174.00	Q
5	Hilde Synnøve Lid	Norway	84.53	84.26	168.79	Q
6	Ji Xiaoou	China	86.10	81.32	167.42	Q
7	Colette Brand	Switzerland	90.40	74.67	165.07	Q
8	Guo Dandan	China	85.68	78.27	163.95	Q
9	Tetiana Kozachenko	Ukraine	72.79	89.30	162.09	Q
10	Michèle Rohrbach	Switzerland	74.67	87.09	161.76	Q
11	Yuliya Kliukova	Ukraine	79.23	82.36	161.59	Q
12	Olena Yunchyk	Ukraine	77.64	79.31	156.95	Q
13	Lina Cheryazova	Uzbekistan	76.45	77.57	154.02	
14	Kirstie Marshall	Australia	66.46	82.53	148.99	
15	Evelyne Leu	Switzerland	93.60	55.12	148.72	
16	Sabina Hudribusch	Austria	68.87	78.56	147.43	
17	Tracy Evans	United States	88.96	58.27	147.23	
18	Liselotte Johansson	Sweden	60.48	79.75	140.23	
19	Caroline Olivier	Canada	57.71	76.23	133.94	
20	Stacey Blumer	United States	84.00	46.90	130.90	
21	Mafalda Pereira	Portugal	60.90	57.96	118.86	
22	Nataliya Orekhova	Russia	69.45	49.16	118.61	
23	Jacqui Cooper	Australia	69.65	31.54	101.19	
24	Yin Hong	China	69.61	21.12	90.73	

=== Final ===
Rank	Name	Country	Jump 1	Jump 2	Total	Notes
1st place, gold medalist(s)	Nikki Stone	United States	98.15	94.85	193.00	
2nd place, silver medalist(s)	Xu Nannan	China	87.57	99.40	186.97	
3rd place, bronze medalist(s)	Colette Brand	Switzerland	87.88	83.95	171.83	
4	Tetiana Kozachenko	Ukraine	81.49	85.83	167.32	
5	Alla Tsuper	Ukraine	82.18	83.94	166.12	
6	Hilde Synnøve Lid	Norway	74.82	85.36	160.18	
7	Guo Dandan	China	89.81	69.93	159.74	
8	Yuliya Kliukova	Ukraine	68.76	84.39	153.15	
9	Veronica Brenner	Canada	60.75	90.40	151.15	
10	Olena Yunchyk	Ukraine	56.84	82.21	139.05	
11	Michèle Rohrbach	Switzerland	61.48	67.88	129.36	
-	Ji Xiaoou	China	DNS	DNS	DNS	
