= Ukraine at the 1993 Winter Universiade =

- IOC code: UKR
- NOC: National Olympic Committee of Ukraine
- Website: noc-ukr.org

in Zakopane, Poland 6 February 1993 – 14 February 1993
- Medals Ranked 11th: Gold 1 Silver 0 Bronze 0 Total 1

Winter Universiade appearances (overview)
- 1993; 1995; 1997; 1999; 2001; 2003; 2005; 2007; 2009; 2011; 2013; 2015; 2017; 2019; 2023; 2025

Ukraine competed at the 1993 Winter Universiade in Zakopane, Poland. Ukraine won one gold medal.

== Medallists ==
Medal	Name	Sport	Event
Gold	Iryna Taranenko; Maryna Pestriakova; Olena Haiasova	Cross-country skiing	Women's relay

== See also ==
- Ukraine at the 1993 Summer Universiade

== Sources ==
- Results
