= 2005 Universiade =

2005 Universiade may refer to:

- 2005 Summer Universiade, a summer sporting event held in Izmir, Turkey
- 2005 Winter Universiade, a winter sporting event held in Innsbruck, Austria
