= Ukraine at the 2007 Winter Universiade =

- IOC code: UKR
- NOC: Sports Students Union of Ukraine
- Website: osvitasport.org

in Turin, Italy 17 January 2007 – 27 January 2007
- Competitors: 91 in 10 sports
- Medals Ranked 11th: Gold 2 Silver 8 Bronze 6 Total 16

Winter Universiade appearances (overview)
- 1993; 1995; 1997; 1999; 2001; 2003; 2005; 2007; 2009; 2011; 2013; 2015; 2017; 2019; 2023; 2025

Ukraine competed at the 2007 Winter Universiade in Turin, Italy. 91 Ukrainian athletes competed in 10 sports out of 12 except for curling and ice hockey. Ukraine won 16 medals, two of which was gold, ranked 11th by number of gold medals and shared with Italy 3rd rank by overall number of medals (after Russia and South Korea).

== Medallists ==
| Medal | Name | Sport | Event |
|---|---|---|---|
| Gold | Oksana Yakovleva | Biathlon | Women's 15 km individual |
| Gold | Vita Semerenko | Biathlon | Women's 10 km pursuit |
| Silver | Serhiy Sednev | Biathlon | Men's 20 km individual |
| Silver | Oleh Berezhnyi | Biathlon | Men's 15 km mass start |
| Silver | Oleh Berezhnyi; Serhiy Sednev; Anton Yunak; Roman Pryma | Biathlon | Men's relay |
| Silver | Valj Semerenko | Biathlon | Women's 7,5 km sprint |
| Silver | Valj Semerenko | Biathlon | Women's 10 km pursuit |
| Silver | Vita Semerenko; Valj Semerenko; Oksana Yakovleva | Biathlon | Women's relay |
| Silver | Vita Jakimchuk | Cross-country skiing | Women's mass start 15 km |
| Silver | Tatiana Volosozhar; Stanislav Morozov | Figure skating | Pairs |
| Bronze | Roman Pryma | Biathlon | Men's 20 km individual |
| Bronze | Serhiy Sednev | Biathlon | Men's 10 km sprint |
| Bronze | Serhiy Sednev | Biathlon | Men's 15 km mass start |
| Bronze | Vita Semerenko | Biathlon | Women's 15 km individual |
| Bronze | Vita Semerenko | Biathlon | Women's 7,5 km sprint |
| Bronze | Valj Semerenko | Biathlon | Women's 12,5 km mass start |

== Figure skating ==
| Athlete | Event | SP | | OD | | FS | | Total | |
| Athlete | Event | Points | Rank | Points | Rank | Points | Rank | Points | Rank |
|---|---|---|---|---|---|---|---|---|---|
| Yaroslav Fursov | Men's singles | 49.61 | 15 | —N/a | | 91.98 | 14 | 141.59 | 16 |
| Alexei Bychenko | Men's singles | 41.48 | 23 | —N/a | | 73.44 | 29 | 114.92 | 29 |
| Alisa Kireeva | Ladies' singles | 21.78 | 29 | —N/a | | 44.00 | 30 | 65.78 | 29 |
| Tetiana Volosozhar; Stanislav Morozov | Pairs | 54.80 | 2 | —N/a | | 95.40 | 2 | 150.20 | 2nd place, silver medalist(s) |
| Olha Oksenych; Oleh Tazetdinov | Ice dance | 25.57 | 6 | 41.89 | 7 | 65.42 | 9 | 132.88 | 7 |
| Nadiia Frolenkova; Mykhailo Kasalo | Ice dance | 22.93 | 10 | 40.57 | 8 | 66.63 | 8 | 130.13 | 9 |
| Alina Saprykina; Pavlo Khimych | Ice dance | 24.05 | 8 | 39.62 | 10 | 63.26 | 10 | 126.93 | 10 |

== Short track speed skating ==
Ukraine was represented by 5 male athletes.

Men

| Athlete | Event | Prel. Heat | | Heat | | Quarterfinal | | Semifinal | | Final | |
| Athlete | Event | Time | Rank | Time | Rank | Time | Rank | Time | Rank | Time | Rank |
|---|---|---|---|---|---|---|---|---|---|---|---|
| Oleksiy Koshelenko | 500 m | 44.895 | 3 q | 45.278 | 4 | Did not advance | | | | | |
| Oleksiy Koshelenko | 1500 m | —N/a | | 2:26.719 | 5 | —N/a | | Did not advance | | | |
| Oleksiy Koshelenko | 3000 m | —N/a | | 5:39.066 | 4 | —N/a | | Did not advance | | | |
| Serhiy Lifyrenko | 500 m | 45.776 | 2 Q | 44.376 | 3 | Did not advance | | | | | |
| Serhiy Lifyrenko | 1000 m | 1:33.529 | 4 | Did not advance | | | | | | | |
| Serhiy Lifyrenko | 1500 m | —N/a | | 2:29.992 | 4 | —N/a | | Did not advance | | | |
| Serhiy Lifyrenko | 3000 m | —N/a | | 5:32.036 | 6 | —N/a | | Did not advance | | | |
| Dmytro Poltavets | 500 m | 44.242 | 3 q | 44.752 | 3 | Did not advance | | | | | |
| Dmytro Poltavets | 1000 m | 1:31.640 | 4 | Did not advance | | | | | | | |
| Dmytro Poltavets | 1500 m | —N/a | | DSQ | | Did not advance | | | | | |
| Dmytro Poltavets | 3000 m | —N/a | | 5:37.819 | 3 | —N/a | | Did not advance | | | |
| Volodymyr Chernega | 500 m | 44.861 | 1 Q | 44.411 | 3 | Did not advance | | | | | |
| Volodymyr Chernega | 1000 m | 1:33.358 | 3 | Did not advance | | | | | | | |
| Volodymyr Chernega | 1500 m | —N/a | | 2:34.417 | 5 | —N/a | | Did not advance | | | |
| Anton Simon | 1000 m | 1:35.375 | 4 | Did not advance | | | | | | | |
| Anton Simon | 3000 m | —N/a | | 5:13.099 | 5 | —N/a | | Did not advance | | | |
| Volodymyr Chernega; Oleksiy Koshelenko; Serhiy Lifyrenko; Dmytro Poltavets | 5000 m relay | —N/a | | 7:14.513 | 2 Q | —N/a | | 7:15.959 | 4 | Did not advance | |

== See also ==
- Ukraine at the 2007 Summer Universiade

== Sources ==
- Archive of the official web site
- Apline Skiing results
- Figure Skating results
- Nordic Combined results
- Ski Jumping results
- Results in speed skating
- Results in short track speed skating
- Snowboarding results
