= Freestyle skiing at the 1996 Asian Winter Games =

- Venue: Yabuli Ski Resort

Freestyle skiing at the 1996 Asian Winter Games took place in the city of Harbin, China with two events contested - one each for men and women.

Freestyle skiing was introduced in this edition of the Winter Asiad.

== Medalists ==
Event	Gold	Silver	Bronze
Men's aerials	Ou Xiaotao; China	Fei Dongpeng; China	Sergey Brener; Uzbekistan
Women's aerials	Guo Dandan; China	Xu Nannan; China	Yin Hong; China

== Medal table ==
Rank	Nation	Gold	Silver	Bronze	Total
1	China (CHN)	2	2	1	5
2	Uzbekistan (UZB)	0	0	1	1
Totals (2 entries)		2	2	2	6
