= Biathlon European Championships 2002 =

International biathlon competition

The 9th Biathlon European Championships were held in Kontiolahti, Finland, from March 6 to March 10, 2002. It was the second time Kontiolahti hosted European Championships after it did so in 1994.

There were total of 16 competitions held: sprint, pursuit, individual and relay both for U26 and U21.

== Results ==
=== U26 ===
==== Men's ====
Competition	1st	2nd	3rd
Men's 10 km sprint	(Latvia) Oļegs Maļuhins	(Germany) Carsten Heymann	(Poland) Tomasz Sikora
Men's 12.5 km pursuit	(Latvia) Oļegs Maļuhins	(Germany) Carsten Heymann	(Latvia) Ilmārs Bricis
Men's 20 km individual	(Ukraine) Andriy Deryzemlia	(Poland) Tomasz Sikora	(Poland) Wojciech Kozub
Men's 4 × 7.5 km relay	(Germany) Germany; Daniel Graf; Carsten Heymann; Andreas Stitzl; Andreas Birnbacher	(Ukraine) Ukraine; Ruslan Lysenko; Olexander Bilanenko; Roman Pryma; Vyacheslav Derkach	(Latvia) Latvia; Oļegs Maļuhins; Gundars Upenieks; Ilmārs Bricis; Jēkabs Nākums

==== Women's ====
Competition	1st	2nd	3rd
Women's 7.5 km sprint	(Russia) Irina Malgina	(Bulgaria) Radka Popova	(Norway) Liv-Kjersti Eikeland
Women's 10 km pursuit	(Russia) Irina Malgina	(Bulgaria) Radka Popova	(Russia) Olga Romasko
Women's 15 km individual	(Bulgaria) Radka Popova	(Russia) Irina Malgina	(Czech Republic) Irena Česneková
Women's 4 × 6 km relay	(Germany) Germany; Ina Menzel; Janet Klein; Simone Denkinger; Sabrina Buchholz	(Russia) Russia; Irina Malgina; Yuliya Makarova; Lilia Efremova; Olga Romasko	(Ukraine) Ukraine; Iryna Merkushina; Nina Lemesh; Oksana Khvostenko; Oksana Yakovleva

=== U21 ===
==== Men's ====
Competition	1st	2nd	3rd
Men's 10 km sprint	(Russia) Andrei Makoveev	(Germany) Michael Rösch	(Slovakia) Dušan Šimočko
Men's 12.5 km pursuit	(Germany) Michael Rösch	(Slovakia) Dušan Šimočko	(Germany) Hansjörg Reuter
Men's 20 km individual	(Russia) Maxim Chudov	(Germany) Hansjörg Reuter	(Latvia) Jānis Bērziņš
Men's 4 × 7.5 km relay	(Russia) Russia; Artem Gusin; Andrei Makoveev; Aleksandr Kudrashev; Maxim Chudov	(Germany) Germany; Michael Rösch; Robert Wick; Hansjörg Reuter; Markus Neumaier	(Latvia) Latvia; Jānis Pleikšnis; Jānis Bērziņš; Edgars Piksons; Kristaps Lībietis

==== Women's ====
Competition	1st	2nd	3rd
Women's 7.5 km sprint	(Czech Republic) Magda Rezlerová	(Slovakia) Zuzana Hasillová	(Germany) Barbara Ertl
Women's 10 km pursuit	(Czech Republic) Magda Rezlerová	(Slovakia) Zuzana Hasillová	(Germany) Barbara Ertl
Women's 15 km individual	(Germany) Jenny Adler	(Belarus) Lyudmila Ananko	(Germany) Barbara Ertl
Women's 3 × 6 km relay	(Germany) Germany; Katharina Echter; Barbara Ertl; Jenny Adler	(Russia) Russia; Elena Davgul; Uliana Denisova; Nadiezhda Chastina	(Belarus) Belarus; Lyudmila Ananko; Tatsiana Shyntar; Liudmila Kalinchik

== Medal table ==
No.	Country	Gold	Silver	Bronze	Total
1	Germany	5	5	4	14
2	Russia	5	3	1	9
3	Latvia	2		4	6
4	Czech Republic	2		1	3
5	Bulgaria	1	2		3
6	Ukraine	1	1	1	3
7	Slovakia		3	1	4
8	Poland		1	1	2
9	Norway			1	1
