= Piotr Orslowski =

Polish luger (born 1974)

Personal information
- Nationality: Polish
- Born: 16 August 1974 (age 50); Jelenia Góra, Poland

Sport
- Sport: Luge

Piotr Orslowski (born 16 August 1974) is a Polish luger. He competed in the men's doubles event at the 1998 Winter Olympics.
