= Robert Mieszała =

Polish luger (born 1973)

Personal information
- Nationality: Polish
- Born: 17 September 1973 (age 51); Jelenia Góra, Poland

Sport
- Sport: Luge

Robert Mieszała (born 17 September 1973) is a Polish luger. He competed in the men's doubles event at the 1998 Winter Olympics.
