= Guo Dandan =

Chinese freestyle skier

Personal information
- Born: 5 August 1977 (age 49) Fushun, China

Sport
- Country: China
- Sport: Freestyle skiing
Medal record
Women's freestyle skiing
Representing China
Asian Games
Gold medal – first place	1996 Harbin	Aerials

Guo Dandan (born 5 August 1977) is a Chinese freestyle skier. She was born in Fushun. She competed at the 1998 Winter Olympics, in women's aerials.
