= Sabina Hudribusch =

Austrian freestyle skier

Personal information
- Born: 11 January 1967 (age 58); Vienna, Austria

Sport
- Country: Austria
- Sport: Freestyle skiing

Sabina Hudribusch (born 11 January 1967) is an Austrian freestyle skier. She was born in Vienna. She competed at the 1998 Winter Olympics in Nagano, in women's aerials.
