= Olha Knysh =

Ukrainian alpine skier (born 1995)

Personal information
- Full name: Olha Knysh
- Born: 6 October 1995 (age 30) Lviv, Ukraine

Sport
- Sport: Skiing
- Updated on 29 January 2018

Olha Ihorivna Knysh (Ukrainian: Ольга Ігорівна Книш; born 6 October 1995) is a former female alpine skier from Ukraine. She represented Ukraine at the 2018 Winter Olympics. She participated thrice at World Cup in giant slalom but she didn't manage to qualify for the second run in any race.

== Sporting career ==
Knysh began skiing in September 1998 in Lviv, Ukraine. She also tried tennis, judo and artistic gymnastics but decided to focus on alpine skiing at the age of 14.

Knysh was coached by former Olympian Yuliya Shepilenko who represented Ukraine at the 1998 Winter Olympics.

She represented Ukraine at the 2011 European Youth Olympic Winter Festival and 2013 European Youth Olympic Winter Festival with her best result being 35th in giant slalom in 2013.

She started at three World Championships between 2015 and 2019. Her best finish was 49th in slalom in 2017.

In 2018, Knysh qualified to represent Ukraine at the 2018 Winter Olympics where she competed in three races and achieved her best result being 43rd in super-G.

Knysh finished her professional sporting career in February 2020. She started to work as ski instructor and fitness coach after retiring from competitive sport.

== Career results ==
=== Winter Olympics ===
Year	Event	SL	GS	SG	DH	AC	T
2018	Pyeongchang, South Korea	45	DNF	43			

=== World Championships ===
Year	Event	SL	GS	SG	DH	AC	T
2015	Vail/Beaver Creek, United States	55	66				
2017	St. Moritz, Switzerland	49	58				
2019	Åre, Sweden	DNF1	55				

== Personal life ==
Knysh graduated from the Lviv State University of Physical Culture.
