= Ukraine at the 2009 Winter Universiade =

- IOC code: UKR
- NOC: Sports Students Union of Ukraine
- Website: osvitasport.org

in Harbin, China 18 February 2009 – 28 February 2009
- Medals Ranked 13th: Gold 1 Silver 2 Bronze 4 Total 7

Winter Universiade appearances (overview)
- 1993; 1995; 1997; 1999; 2001; 2003; 2005; 2007; 2009; 2011; 2013; 2015; 2017; 2019; 2023; 2025

Ukraine competed at the 2009 Winter Universiade in Harbin, China. Ukrainian athletes competed in 10 sports out of 12 except for curling and ice hockey. Ukraine won seven medals, one of which was gold, and ranked 13th.

== Medallists ==
Medal	Name	Sport	Event
Gold	Oleh Berezhnyi	Biathlon	Men's 12.5 km pursuit
Silver	Oleh Berezhnyi	Biathlon	Men's 10 km sprint
Silver	Maria Loseva; Marina Malets; Tatjana Zavalij	Cross-country skiing	Women's 3 x 5 km relay
Bronze	Serhiy Semenov	Biathlon	Men's 20 km individual
Bronze	Liudmyla Zhyber; Valentyna Shestak; Anton Yunak; Oleksandr Kolos	Biathlon	Mixed relay 2 x 6 km + 2 x 7,5 km
Bronze	Marina Malets	Cross-country skiing	Women's individual sprint
Bronze	Alla Beknazarova; Vladimir Zuev	Figure skating	Ice dancing

== Figure skating ==
Athlete	Event	SP		OD		FS		Total	
Athlete	Event	Points	Rank	Points	Rank	Points	Rank	Points	Rank
Vitali Sazonets	Men's singles	43.47	27	—N/a		107.22	8	150.69	16
Kateryna Proyda	Ladies' singles	34.86	25	—N/a		57.29	26	92.15	25
Kateryna Kostenko; Roman Talan	Pairs	41.52	7	—N/a		72.83	7	114.35	7
Alla Beknazarova; Volodymyr Zuev	Ice dance	33.44	3	50.54	4	79.09	5	163.07	3rd place, bronze medalist(s)
Nadiia Frolenkova; Mykhailo Kasalo	Ice dance	26.23	10	39.63	11	67.20	11	133.06	10

== Short track speed skating ==
Ukraine was represented by 4 athletes.

Men

Athlete	Event	Prel. Heat		Heat		Quarterfinal		Semifinal		Final	
Athlete	Event	Time	Rank	Time	Rank	Time	Rank	Time	Rank	Time	Rank
Oleksiy Koshelenko	500 m	DSQ		Did not advance							
Oleksiy Koshelenko	1000 m	—N/a		1:34.338	3	Did not advance					
Oleksiy Koshelenko	1500 m	—N/a		2:23.854	5	—N/a		Did not advance			
Oleksiy Koshelenko	3000 m	—N/a		5:19.463	7	—N/a		Did not advance			
Ievgen Gutenkov	500 m	45.351	3	Did not advance							
Ievgen Gutenkov	1000 m	—N/a		1:33.126	5	Did not advance					
Ievgen Gutenkov	1500 m	—N/a		2:25.584	3 ADV	—N/a		2:27.662	7	Did not advance	
Ievgen Gutenkov	3000 m	—N/a		5:13.127	5	—N/a		Did not advance			
Dmytro Poltavets	500 m	45.036	3	Did not advance							
Dmytro Poltavets	1000 m	—N/a		1:33.916	3	Did not advance					
Dmytro Poltavets	1500 m	—N/a		2:22.992	3 q	—N/a		2:21.011	5	Did not advance	
Dmytro Poltavets	3000 m	—N/a		5:29.648	5	—N/a		Did not advance			
Serhiy Lifyrenko	500 m	1:03.397	4	Did not advance							
Serhiy Lifyrenko	1000 m	—N/a		1:30.500	3	Did not advance					
Serhiy Lifyrenko	1500 m	—N/a		2:27.803	4	—N/a		Did not advance			
Serhiy Lifyrenko	3000 m	—N/a		5:12.441	4	—N/a		Did not advance			
Dmytro Poltavets; Ievgen Gutenkov; Serhiy Lifyrenko; Oleksiy Koshelenko	5000 m relay	—N/a						7:11.239	3	Did not advance	

== See also ==
- Ukraine at the 2009 Summer Universiade

== Sources ==
- Archive of the official web site
- Results in speed skating
- Results in short track speed skating
