= Xu Nannan =

Chinese freestyle skier (born 1977)

Medal record

Representing China

Women's freestyle skiing

Olympic Games
Silver medal – second place	1998 Nagano	Aerials

Asian Winter Games
Silver medal – second place	1996 Harbin	Aerials

Xu Nannan (徐囡囡; born August 16, 1977 in Benxi, Liaoning, China) is a Chinese freestyle skier and Olympic medalist. She received a silver medal at the 1998 Winter Olympics in Nagano, in aerials.

She participated at the 1996 Asian Winter Games in Harbin, where she received a silver medal.
