= Yuriy Panchuk =

Ukrainian bobsledder

Personal information
- Nationality: Ukrainian
- Born: 28 April 1965 (age 59); Kyiv, Ukrainian SSR, Soviet Union

Sport
- Sport: Bobsleigh

Yuriy Panchuk (born 28 April 1965) is a Ukrainian bobsledder. He competed in the two man event at the 1998 Winter Olympics.
