= Barbara Ertl =

Italian biathlete (born 1982)

Personal information
- Nationality: Italian
- Born: 27 January 1982 (age 43); Benediktbeuern, Germany

Sport
- Sport: Biathlon
- Club: SS Campo Tures

Barbara Ertl (born 27 January 1982) is an Italian biathlete. She competed in two events at the 2006 Winter Olympics. She lives in Sand in Taufers, Italy.
