= Yuliya Kliukova =

Ukrainian freestyle skier

Personal information
- Nationality: Ukrainian
- Born: 10 January 1982 (age 43) Ivano-Frankivsk, Ukrainian SSR, Soviet Union

Sport
- Country: Ukraine
- Sport: Freestyle skiing

Yuliya Kliukova (born 10 January 1982) is a Ukrainian freestyle skier. She was born in Ivano-Frankivsk. She competed at the 1998 Winter Olympics, in women's aerials.

On 26 February 2000, she became the first Ukrainian to land a podium place at a Freestyle Skiing World Cup event, when she finished 3rd in aerials in Piancavallo, Italy. This was her last competition at an international level.

== World Cup podiums ==
Date	Location	Rank	Event
26 February 2000	Piancavallo	3rd place, bronze medalist(s)	Aerials
