= Tetiana Kozachenko =

Ukrainian freestyle skier

Personal information
- Nationality: Ukrainian
- Born: 18 December 1981 (age 44) Rivne, Ukrainian SSR, Soviet Union

Sport
- Country: Ukraine
- Sport: Freestyle skiing

Tetiana Valeriïvna Kozachenko (Ukrainian: Тетяна Валеріївна Козаченко, born 18 December 1981) is a former Ukrainian freestyle skier. Kozachenko finished 4th in Aerial skiing at the 1998 Winter Olympics.

== World Cup podiums ==
Date	Location	Rank	Event
8 January 2006	Mont Gabriel	3rd place, bronze medalist(s)	Aerials
