= Oleh Polyvach =

Ukrainian bobsledder

Personal information
- Nationality: Ukrainian
- Born: 16 January 1975 (age 50); Kyiv, Ukrainian SSR, Soviet Union

Sport
- Sport: Bobsleigh

Oleh Polyvach (born 16 January 1975) is a Ukrainian bobsledder. He competed at the 1998 Winter Olympics and the 2002 Winter Olympics.
