= Volodymyr Olshanskiy =

Ukrainian cross-country skier (born 1976)

Personal information
- Nationality: Ukrainian
- Born: 21 February 1976 (age 50) Sumy, Ukraine

Sport
- Sport: Cross-country skiing
Medal record
Men's cross-country skiing
Representing Ukraine
Winter Universiade
Silver medal – second place	2001 Zakopane	Relay
Bronze medal – third place	1997 Muju	Relay

Volodymyr Olshanskiy (born 21 February 1976) is a Ukrainian cross-country skier. He competed in the men's 15 kilometre classical event at the 2006 Winter Olympics.
