= Olena Yunchyk =

Ukrainian freestyle skier

Personal information
- Nationality: Ukrainian
- Born: 9 September 1982 (age 42); Rivne, Ukrainian SSR, Soviet Union

Sport
- Country: Ukraine
- Sport: Freestyle skiing

Olena Yunchyk (born 9 September 1982) is a Ukrainian freestyle skier. She was born in Rivne. She competed at the 1998 Winter Olympics, in women's aerials.
