= Oleksandr Zarovniy =

Ukrainian cross-country skier (born 1975)

Personal information
- Nationality: Ukrainian
- Born: 20 February 1975 (age 51) Chernihiv, Ukraine

Sport
- Sport: Cross-country skiing
Medal record
Men's cross-country skiing
Representing Ukraine
Winter Universiade
| Silver medal – second place | 2001 Zakopane | Relay |
| Bronze medal – third place | 1995 Jaca | Relay |

Oleksandr Zarovniy (born 20 February 1975) is a Ukrainian cross-country skier. He competed in the men's 10 kilometre classical event at the 1998 Winter Olympics.
