= Yuriy Stetsko =

Ukrainian freestyle skier

Personal information
- Nationality: Ukrainian
- Born: 4 August 1981 (age 43); Rivne, Ukraine

Sport
- Sport: Freestyle skiing

Yuriy Stetsko (born 4 August 1981) is a Ukrainian freestyle skier. He competed in the men's aerials event at the 1998 Winter Olympics.
