= Oleg Voyko =

Ukrainian ice dancer (born 1980)

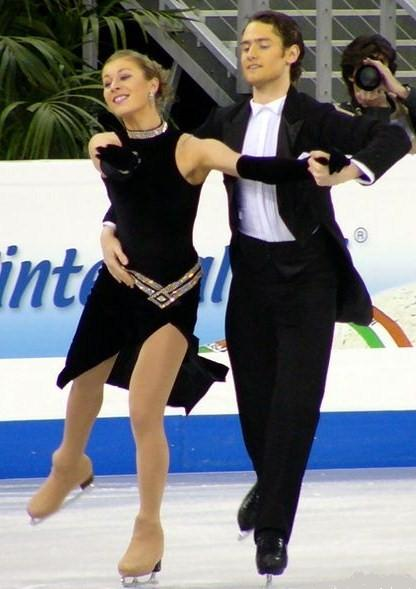
- Golovina and Voiko in 2004

Personal information
- Native name: Олег Войко
- Born: March 25, 1980 (age 46) Kharkiv, Ukrainian SSR, Soviet Union (now Ukraine)
- Height: 1.76 m (5 ft 9 1/2 in)

Figure skating career
- Country: Ukraine
- Began skating: 1984
- Retired: 2006
Medal record
Figure skating: Ice dancing
Representing Ukraine
Winter Universiade
Silver medal – second place	2005 Innsbruck	Ice dancing

Oleg Yevhenovych Voyko (Note: Ukrainian: Олег Євгенович Войко, romanized: Oleh Yevhenovych Voiko) (born March 25, 1980) is a Ukrainian former ice dancer. With former partner Julia Golovina, he is the 2003 Ukrainian national champion. They competed at the 2002 Winter Olympics and the 2006 Winter Olympics, placing 21st and 23rd, respectively.

== Career ==
Voyko began skating at age three. Initially a singles skater, he first took up ice dancing at age nine, and then took time off from skating. In 1996, he teamed up with Kristina Kobaladze. They placed fourth at the 1999 World Junior Championships and fifth at the 2000 World Junior Championships. They were coached by Galina Churilova in Kharkiv. Their partnership ended in 2000.

Voyko teamed up with Julia Golovina later in the same year. Their highest placement at an ISU Championship was 15th at the 2003 and 2004 European Figure Skating Championships. They skated together until 2006.

Voyko briefly competed with Natalie Bos. He works as a skating coach in Connecticut. He is married with three kids.

== Programs ==
=== With Golovina ===
Season	Short dance	Free dance
2005–2006	Samba: Ritmo de Bom-Bom by Vimi; Rhumba: Eres Todo en Mí by Ana Gabriel; Samba: Ritmo de Bom-Bom by Vimi	Adiós Nonino by Astor Piazzolla
2002–2003	March: Radetzky March op. 228 by Johann Strauss I; Waltz: Waltz No. 2 by Dmitri Shostakovich	Skake by T Naito - Kodo Drums; I Put a Spell on You
2001–2002	Tango: Verano Porteno by Raul Garello; Flamenco: Nyah (from Mission: Impossible II)	Nothing Else Matters

=== With Kobaladze ===
Season	Short dance	Free dance
1999–2000		Allegria (from Cirque du Soleil) by René Dupéré

== Results ==
GP: Grand Prix; JGP: Junior Series / Junior Grand Prix

=== With Golovina ===
International
Event	00–01	01–02	02–03	03–04	04–05	05–06
Winter Olympics		21st				23rd
World Champ.				22nd	21st	21st
European Champ.		18th	15th	15th	16th	17th
GP Cup of China						8th
GP Cup of Russia			8th			
GP NHK Trophy				9th	7th	
GP Skate America				8th	6th	12th
Golden Spin		6th	1st			
Nepela Memorial		1st	1st			
Winter Universiade	7th				2nd	
International: Junior
JGP Final		WD				
JGP Czech Republic		1st				
JGP Netherlands		2nd				
National
Ukrainian Champ.	3rd	2nd	1st	2nd	2nd	2nd

=== With Kobaladze ===
International
Event	95–96	96–97	97–98	98–99	99–00
European Champ.				21st	18th
International: Junior
World Junior Champ.		15th	9th	4th	5th
JGP Final				5th	3rd
JGP Czech Republic					1st
JGP Germany			7th		
JGP Slovakia				2nd	
JGP Sweden					2nd
JGP Ukraine			3rd	1st	
Blue Swords	13th J	10th J			
EYOF		7th J			
Ukrainian Souvenir	6th J				
National
Ukrainian Champ.	2nd J	1st J	2nd J	2nd	1st
