= Julia Golovina =

Ukrainian ice dancer (born 1982)

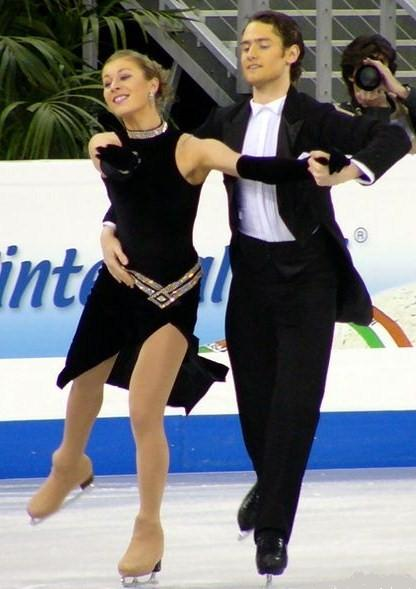
- Golovina and Voiko in 2004

Personal information
- Born: 30 May 1982 (age 44) Kharkiv, Ukrainian SSR
- Height: 1.65 m (5 ft 5 in)

Figure skating career
- Country: Ukraine; Russia
- Skating club: Dallas Figure Skating Club
- Began skating: 1986
- Retired: 2006
Medal record
Figure skating: Ice dancing
Representing Ukraine
Winter Universiade
Silver medal – second place	2005 Innsbruck	Ice dancing

Julia Golovina (born 30 May 1982) is a Ukrainian former competitive ice dancer. With former partner Oleg Voiko, she is the 2003 Ukrainian national champion. They competed at the 2002 Winter Olympics and the 2006 Winter Olympics, placing 21st and 23rd, respectively. Their highest placement at an ISU Championship was 15th at the 2003 and 2004 European Figure Skating Championships.

Initially a singles skater, Golovina took up ice dancing at 14 years old. She competed for Russia with Denis Egorov for four years. They placed sixth at the 1999 World Junior Championships. In 2000, she teamed up with Oleg Voiko.

== Results ==
GP: Grand Prix; JGP: Junior Grand Prix

=== With Voiko for Ukraine ===
International
Event	00–01	01–02	02–03	03–04	04–05	05–06
Winter Olympics		21st				23rd
World Champ.				22nd	21st	21st
European Champ.		18th	15th	15th	16th	17th
GP Cup of China						8th
GP Cup of Russia			8th			
GP NHK Trophy				9th	7th	
GP Skate America				8th	6th	12th
Golden Spin		6th	1st			
Nepela Memorial		1st	1st			
Winter Universiade	7th				2nd	
International: Junior
JGP Final		WD				
JGP Czech Republic		1st				
JGP Netherlands		2nd				
National
Ukrainian Champ.	3rd	2nd	1st	2nd	2nd	2nd

=== With Egorov for Russia ===
International
Event	96–97	97–98	98–99	99–00
Junior Worlds			6th	
JGP Final			4th	
JGP Bulgaria		3rd		
JGP Czech Rep.				2nd
JGP France		3rd		
JGP Hungary			1st	
JGP Norway				2nd
JGP Ukraine			2nd	
Autumn Trophy	6th J			
