= Hanna Slipenko =

Ukrainian cross-country skier (born 1973)

Personal information
- Nationality: Ukrainian
- Born: 22 November 1973 (age 52) Severodvinsk, Russia

Sport
- Sport: Cross-country skiing
Medal record
Women's cross-country skiing
Representing Ukraine
Winter Universiade
Bronze medal – third place	1995 Jaca	10 km classical
Bronze medal – third place	1995 Jaca	Relay

Hanna Slipenko (born 22 November 1973) is a Ukrainian cross-country skier. She competed in the women's 30 kilometre freestyle event at the 1998 Winter Olympics.
