= Figure skating at the 2005 Winter Universiade =

Figure skating competition

- Type: Senior international
- Date: January 12 – 22
- Season: 2004–05
- Location: Innsbruck, Austria

Champions
- Men's singles: (Japan) Daisuke Takahashi
- Ladies' singles: (Japan) Yoshie Onda
- Pairs: (China) Zhang Dan / Zhang Hao
- Ice dance: (Russia) Jana Khokhlova / Sergei Novitski
- Previous: 2003 Winter Universiade
- Next: 2007 Winter Universiade

Figure skating was contested at the 2005 Winter Universiade. Skaters competed in the disciplines of men's singles, ladies' singles, pair skating, and ice dancing.

== Results ==
=== Men ===
| Rank | Name | Nation | TFP | SP | FS |
|---|---|---|---|---|---|
| 1 | Daisuke Takahashi | Japan | 2.0 | 2 | 1 |
| 2 | Song Lun | China | 2.5 | 1 | 2 |
| 3 | Hu Xiaoou | China | 6.0 | 4 | 4 |
| 4 | Kensuke Nakaniwa | Japan | 7.0 | 8 | 3 |
| 5 | Andrei Lutai | Russia | 8.0 | 6 | 5 |
| 6 | Alban Préaubert | France | 8.5 | 5 | 6 |
| 7 | Gao Song | China | 9.5 | 3 | 8 |
| 8 | Yasuharu Nanri | Japan | 10.5 | 7 | 7 |
| 9 | Filip Stiller | Sweden | 13.5 | 9 | 9 |
| 10 | Yannick Ponsero | France | 16.5 | 11 | 11 |
| 11 | Konstantin Menshov | Russia | 17.0 | 14 | 10 |
| 12 | Stanick Jeannette | France | 18.0 | 10 | 13 |
| 13 | Denis Balandin | Russia | 19.5 | 15 | 12 |
| 14 | Anton Kovalevski | Ukraine | 21.5 | 13 | 15 |
| 15 | Lukáš Rakowski | Czech Republic | 22.0 | 12 | 16 |
| 16 | Maciej Kuś | Poland | 22.5 | 17 | 14 |
| 17 | Frederik Pauls | Germany | 25.0 | 16 | 17 |
| 18 | Fabio Mascarello | Italy | 27.0 | 18 | 18 |
| 19 | Adis Reklys | Lithuania | 29.0 | 20 | 19 |
| 20 | Christian Rauchbauer | Austria | 30.5 | 21 | 20 |
| 21 | Igor Rolinski | Belarus | 30.5 | 19 | 21 |
| 22 | Alper Uçar | Turkey | 33.5 | 23 | 22 |
| 23 | Adrian Alvarado | Mexico | 34.0 | 22 | 23 |

=== Ladies ===
| Rank | Name | Nation | TFP | SP | FS |
|---|---|---|---|---|---|
| 1 | Yoshie Onda | Japan | 2.5 | 3 | 1 |
| 2 | Galina Maniachenko | Ukraine | 3.5 | 1 | 3 |
| 3 | Liu Yan | China | 5.0 | 6 | 2 |
| 4 | Yukari Nakano | Japan | 6.0 | 4 | 4 |
| 5 | Sarah Meier | Switzerland | 6.0 | 2 | 5 |
| 6 | Olga Naidenova | Russia | 8.5 | 5 | 6 |
| 7 | Idora Hegel | Croatia | 11.0 | 8 | 7 |
| 8 | Akiko Suzuki | Japan | 11.5 | 7 | 8 |
| 9 | Fang Dan | China | 15.0 | 12 | 9 |
| 10 | Bao Li | China | 16.5 | 11 | 11 |
| 11 | Elena Zhidkova | Russia | 16.5 | 9 | 12 |
| 12 | Andrea Kreuzer | Austria | 20.0 | 10 | 15 |
| 13 | Miia Marttinen | Finland | 20.5 | 15 | 13 |
| 14 | Tytti Tervonen | Finland | 22.0 | 24 | 10 |
| 15 | Malin Hållberg-Leuf | Sweden | 22.0 | 16 | 14 |
| 16 | Roxana Luca | Romania | 22.5 | 13 | 16 |
| 17 | Iryna Lukianenko | Ukraine | 27.5 | 21 | 17 |
| 18 | Anja Bratec | Slovenia | 27.5 | 19 | 18 |
| 19 | Park Bit-na | South Korea | 28.5 | 17 | 20 |
| 20 | Silvia Koncokova | Slovakia | 29.0 | 14 | 22 |
| 21 | Lee Chu-hong | South Korea | 30.0 | 22 | 19 |
| 22 | Anni Luftensteiner | Austria | 33.0 | 20 | 23 |
| 23 | Ivana Hudziecová | Czech Republic | 33.0 | 18 | 24 |
| 24 | Sarah-Yvonne Prytula | Australia | 33.5 | 25 | 21 |
| 25 | Ekaterina Bourtseva | Russia | 36.5 | 23 | 25 |
| 26 | Alenka Zidar | Slovenia | 40.0 | 28 | 26 |
| 27 | Darja Škrlj | Slovenia | 40.0 | 26 | 27 |
| 28 | Gamze Iyiis | Turkey | 42.5 | 27 | 29 |
| 29 | Ksenija Jastsenjski | Serbia and Montenegro | 43.0 | 30 | 28 |
| 30 | Hsin-Hui Tsai | Chinese Taipei | 46.0 | 32 | 30 |
| 31 | Anny Hou | Chinese Taipei | 46.5 | 31 | 31 |
| 32 | Liina-Grete Lilender | Estonia | 47.5 | 29 | 33 |
| 33 | Sofia Florell | Sweden | 48.5 | 33 | 32 |

=== Pairs ===
| Rank | Name | Nation | TFP | SP | FS |
|---|---|---|---|---|---|
| 1 | Zhang Dan / Zhang Hao | China | 1.5 | 1 | 1 |
| 2 | Tatiana Volosozhar / Stanislav Morozov | Ukraine | 3.5 | 3 | 2 |
| 3 | Maria Mukhortova / Maxim Trankov | Russia | 4.0 | 2 | 3 |
| 4 | Ding Yang / Ren Zhongfei | China | 6.0 | 4 | 4 |
| 5 | Ekaterina Gladkova / Mikhail Bolshedvorski | Russia | 7.5 | 5 | 5 |
| 6 | Julia Beloglazova / Andrei Bekh | Ukraine | 9.0 | 6 | 6 |

=== Ice dancing ===
| Rank | Name | Nation | TFP | CD | OD | FD |
|---|---|---|---|---|---|---|
| 1 | Jana Khokhlova / Sergei Novitski | Russia | 2.0 | 1 | 1 | 1 |
| 2 | Julia Golovina / Oleg Voiko | Ukraine | 4.4 | 3 | 2 | 2 |
| 3 | Nathalie Péchalat / Fabian Bourzat | France | 5.6 | 2 | 3 | 3 |
| 4 | Elena Romanovskaya / Alexander Grachev | Russia | 8.0 | 4 | 4 | 4 |
| 5 | Ekaterina Rubleva / Ivan Shefer | Russia | 10.0 | 5 | 5 | 5 |
| 6 | Anna Zadorozhniuk / Sergei Verbillo | Ukraine | 13.6 | 7 | 8 | 6 |
| 7 | Alla Beknazarova / Vladimir Zuev | Ukraine | 14.0 | 6 | 6 | 8 |
| 8 | Diana Janostakova / Jiří Procházka | Czech Republic | 14.4 | 8 | 7 | 7 |
| 9 | Yu Xiaoyang / Wang Chen | China | 18.0 | 9 | 9 | 9 |
| 10 | Amandi Borsi / Fabrice Blondel | France | 20.0 | 10 | 10 | 10 |
| 11 | Minami Sakacho / Tatsuya Sakacho | Japan | 22.4 | 12 | 11 | 11 |
| 12 | Qi Jia / Sun Xu | China | 24.6 | 11 | 12 | 13 |
| 13 | Anna Galcheniuk / Oleg Krupen | Belarus | 25.4 | 14 | 13 | 12 |
| 14 | Kim Hye-min / Kim Min-woo | South Korea | 27.6 | 13 | 14 | 14 |
