= National University of Ukraine on Physical Education and Sport =

University in Kyiv, Ukraine

- Національний університет фізичного виховання і спорту України
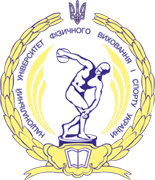
- Established: 1930
- Accreditation: Ministry of Education and Science of Ukraine
- Rector: Yevhen Imas
- Students: 3,000
- Location: Kyiv, Ukraine; 50°25′51″N 30°31′6″E
- Website: uni-sport.com.ua
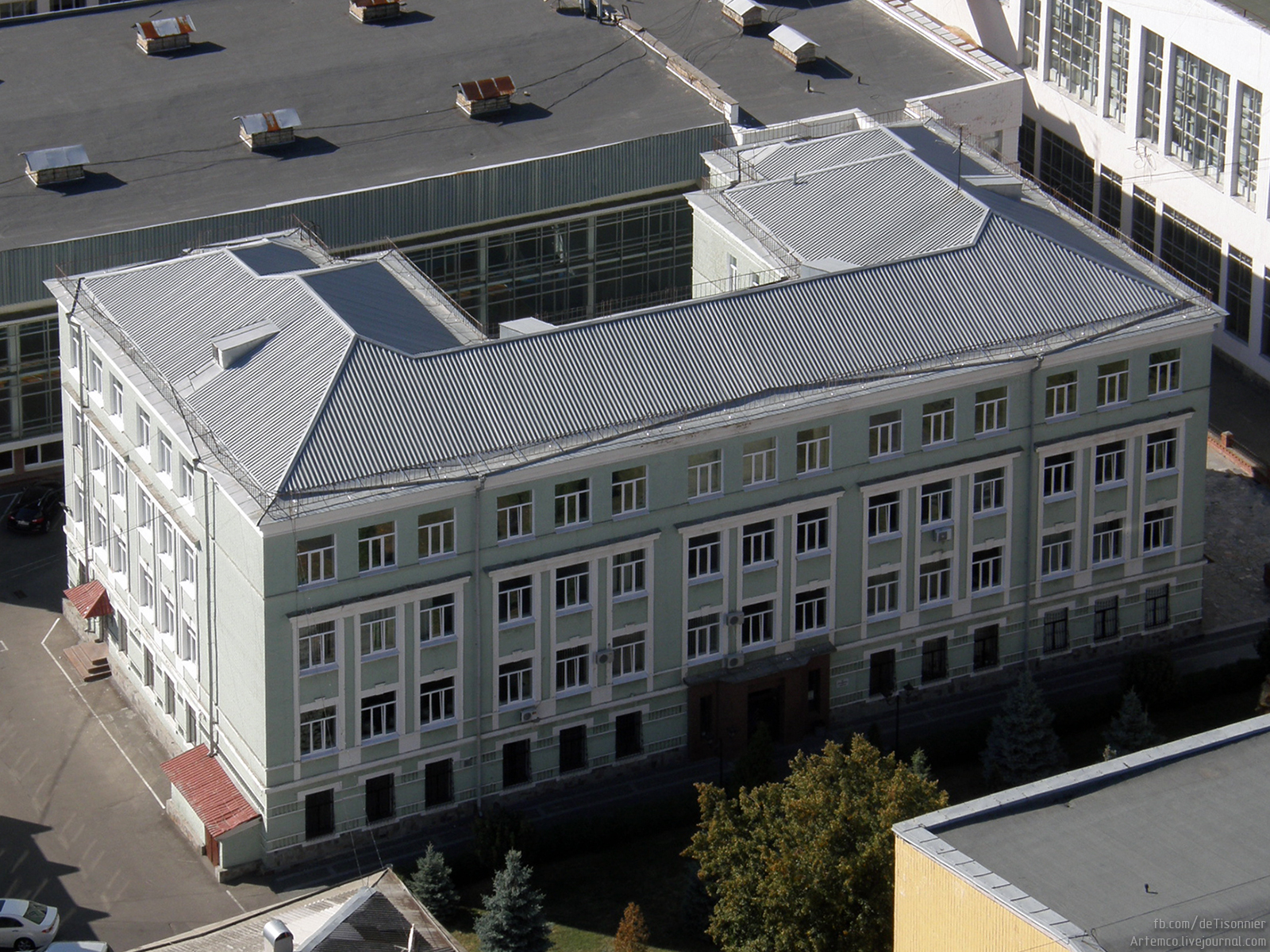

The National University of Ukraine on Physical Education and Sport is a Ukrainian university in Kyiv.

== History ==
The university opened in 1930 as the National Institute of Physical Education of Ukraine in Kharkiv. In 1944 the institute was transferred to Kyiv and changed its name to Kyiv State Institute of Physical Education.

After the independence of Ukraine, in 1995 the university was reorganized in Kyiv National University of Physical Education, which in 1998 acquired the status of national and adopted the name of the National University of Physical Education and Sport of Ukraine.

== Structure ==
Four faculties function in the structure of the university and one branch in Ivano-Frankivsk.

- Coach Faculty
- Sport and Management Faculty
- Health, Physical Education and Tourism Faculty
- Extra-Mural Faculty (distance learning)
- Ivano-Frankivsk College of Physical Education

== Sports and supporting facilities ==
- Rowing facilities at Dnieper
- Biking and skiing facilities at the Holosiiv Park
- Sports complex "Olimp"
  - main short course pool with six lanes (25x12 m)
  - two children's pools (13.6x2.8 m and 5.7x2.8 m)
- Fitness center "Olimpiysky styl" (Olympic style)
- Center of sport traumatology
- International center of Olympic research and education
- Research Institute
- Library

== See also ==
- List of universities in Ukraine
