= Oleksandr Ushkalenko =

Ukrainian cross-country skier (born 1964)

Personal information
- Nationality: Ukrainian
- Born: 2 August 1964 (age 60); Sumy, Ukraine

Sport
- Sport: Cross-country skiing

Oleksandr Ushkalenko (born 2 August 1964) is a Ukrainian cross-country skier. He competed in the men's 30 kilometre classical event at the 1998 Winter Olympics.
