= Andriy Mukhin =

Ukrainian luger (born 1971)

Andriy Mukhin (born 6 January 1971 in Kyiv, Ukrainian SSR, Soviet Union) is a Ukrainian luger who competed in the mid to late 1990s. Competing in two Winter Olympics, he earned his best finish of seventh in the men's doubles event at Nagano in 1998.
