= Erin Gleason =

American speed skater (born 1977)

Personal information
- Nationality: American
- Born: September 18, 1977 (age 47); Dover Township, New Jersey, United States

Sport
- Sport: Short track speed skating

Erin Gleason (born September 18, 1977) is an American short track speed skater. She competed in three events at the 1998 Winter Olympics. Raised in Jackson Township, New Jersey, Gleason graduated from Jackson Memorial High School.
