= Ikue Teshigawara =

Japanese speed skater (born 1978)

Personal information
- Nationality: Japanese
- Born: 27 October 1978 (age 46); Gifu, Japan

Sport
- Sport: Short track speed skating

Ikue Teshigawara (勅使川原 郁恵, Teshigawara Ikue, born 27 October 1978) is a Japanese short track speed skater. She competed at the 1998 Winter Olympics, the 2002 Winter Olympics and the 2006 Winter Olympics.
