= Yin Hong (skier) =

Chinese freestyle skier

Personal information
- Nationality: Chinese
- Born: 15 January 1976 (age 49)

Sport
- Sport: Freestyle skiing

Yin Hong (born 15 January 1976) is a Chinese freestyle skier. She competed at the 1994 Winter Olympics and the 1998 Winter Olympics.
