= Anastasiya Shepilenko =

Ukrainian alpine skier (born 2000)

Personal information
- Born: 9 October 2000 (age 25) Lviv, Ukraine

Skiing career
- Country: Ukraine
- Sport: Alpine skiing
- Disciplines: Super-G, giant slalom, slalom
- World Cup debut: 23 January 2022

Olympics
- Teams: 2 – (2022, 2026)

World Championships
- Teams: 4 – (2019, 2021, 2023, 2025)

World Cup
- Seasons: 2 – (2022, 2025)

Anastasiya Ruslanivna Shepilenko (Ukrainian: Анастасія Русланівна Шепіленко, born 9 October 2000) is a World Cup alpine ski racer from Ukraine. She represented Ukraine at the 2022 and 2026 Winter Olympics.

== Career ==
Shepilenko was born in Lviv. She started her international career in 2017 when she represented Ukraine at the 2017 European Youth Olympic Winter Festival in Turkish Erzerum (she was 25th in slalom and 36th in giant slalom). After that she competed at four World Junior Championships achieving following best results by discipline: 23rd in alpine combined in 2020, 28th in Super-G in 2020, 30th in slalom in 2021, 35th in downhill in 2020, 51st in giant slalom in 2020. She also competed at the 2023 and 2025 Winter World University Games, achieving 3 finished in the top 10 with 7th in the 2025 Super-G being the best result.

Shepilenko debuted at the World Cup on 23 January 2022, when she finished 34th in Super-G in Cortina d'Ampezzo.

In 2022, Anastasiya Shepilenko was nominated for her first Winter Games in Beijing. Her best finish at the Games was 37th in Super-G.

As of January 2025, Shepilenko participated at four consecutive World Championships from 2019 to 2025. As of 2025, her best performance was 30th in Super-G in 2023. In 2025, Ukraine competed in the team event for the first time ever, losing 0–4 to Italy in the first round. The team included both sisters Shepilenko, Maksym Mariichyn, and Roman Tsybelenko.

On 3 September 2025, Anastasiya Shepilenko finished 3rd behind American Haley Cutler and Czech Barbora Novakova in downhill at the South American Cup stage held in La Parva, Chile.

== Career results ==
=== Olympics ===
Year
Year	Age	Slalom	Giant slalom	Super-G	Downhill	Combined	Team combined	Team event
2022	21	DNF1	39	37	—	—	—N/a	—
2026	25	DNF1	39	DNF	32	—N/a	—	—N/a

=== World Championships ===
Year
Year	Age	Slalom	Giant slalom	Super-G	Downhill	Combined	Team combined	Team event
2019	18	41	64	—	—	—	—N/a	—
2021	20	35	36	39	—	—	—N/a	—
2023	22	47	36	30	—	—	—N/a	—
2025	24	DNF1	DNF2	31	—	—N/a	—	13

=== World Cup ===
==== Results per discipline ====
Discipline	WC starts	WC Podium	WC Top 5	WC Top 15	WC Top 30	Best result		
Discipline	WC starts	WC Podium	WC Top 5	WC Top 15	WC Top 30	Date	Location	Place
Slalom	0	0	0	0	0			
Giant slalom	2	0	0	0	0	26 October 2024	Sölden, Austria	56th
Super-G	1	0	0	0	0	23 January 2022	Cortina d'Ampezzo, Italy	34th
Downhill	0	0	0	0	0			
Combined	0	0	0	0	0			
Total	3	0	0	0	0			

- Standings through 2 January 2026.

=== European Cup ===
==== Results per discipline ====
Discipline	EC starts	EC Podium	EC Top 5	EC Top 15	EC Top 30	Best result		
Discipline	EC starts	EC Podium	EC Top 5	EC Top 15	EC Top 30	Date	Location	Place
Slalom	2	0	0	0	0	17 January 2020	Zell am See, Austria	48th
Giant slalom	7	0	0	0	1	3 December 2024	Zinal, Switzerland	30th
Super-G	3	0	0	0	0	20 January 2026	St. Anton, Austria	49th
Downhill	4	0	0	0	0	2 February 2023	Châtel, France	42th
Combined	0	0	0	0	0			
Total	16	0	0	0	1			

- Standings through 27 February 2026.

== Personal life ==
Her mother, Yuliya Shepilenko, is a former alpine skier who represented Ukraine at the 1998 Winter Olympics. Her sister Kateryna, who is two years younger, is also an alpine skier and participated at the World Championships.

Shepilenko studied at Lviv State School of Physical Culture. She completed a bachelor's programm in physical education and sports at the Lviv State University of Physical Culture.
