= Yuliya Shepilenko =

Ukrainian alpine skier (born 1976)

Personal information
- Nationality: Ukrainian
- Born: 14 September 1976 (age 48); Lviv, Ukrainian SSR, Soviet Union

Sport
- Sport: Alpine skiing

Yuliya Shepilenko (née Kharkivska, born 14 September 1976) is a former female Ukrainian alpine skier. She competed in two events at the 1998 Winter Olympics. She finished 33rd in downhill and 20th in combined.

After she finished her sporting career, she started to work as alpine skiing coach. She coached Olha Knysh who represented Ukraine at the 2018 Winter Olympics. Both her daughters, Anastasiya and Kateryna, compete in alpine skiing. Anastasiya represented Ukraine at the 2022 Winter Olympics.
