= Oleh Avdieiev =

Ukrainian luger (1973–2026)

Personal information
- Nationality: Ukrainian
- Born: 7 April 1973 Lviv, Ukrainian SSR, Soviet Union
- Died: 2 April 2026 (aged 52) Lviv, Ukraine

Sport
- Sport: Luge

Oleh Avdieiev (Ukrainian: Олег Авдєєв; 7 April 1973 – 2 April 2026) was a Ukrainian luger. He competed at the 1998 Winter Olympics and the 2002 Winter Olympics. While conducting a check on customs documents relating to mobilization measures during the Russo-Ukrainian war, Avdieiev, an employee of the Lviv territorial recruitment and social support center, was stabbed in the neck by one of the two occupants of the vehicle being checked. Avdieiev died from his wound in Lviv on 2 April 2026, at the age of 52.
