= Bohdan Borkovskyi =

Ukrainian biathlete (born 2004)

Personal information
- Nationality: Ukrainian
- Born: 18 April 2004 (age 22) Zhovtneve, Sumy Oblast, Ukraine

Sport
- Country: Ukraine
- Sport: Biathlon
Medal record
Men's biathlon
Representing Ukraine
Universiade
Gold medal – first place	2025 Turin	Short individual
Gold medal – first place	2025 Turin	Pursuit
Bronze medal – third place	2025 Turin	Sprint
Junior and Youth World Championships
Silver medal – second place	2024 Otepää	Junior Relay
Bronze medal – third place	2023 Shchuchinsk	Youth Mixed relay

Bohdan Mykolaiovych Borkovskyi (Ukrainian: Богдан Миколайович Борковський, born 18 April 2004) is a Ukrainian biathlete. He has competed in the Biathlon World Cup since 2025.

== Biathlon results ==
All results are sourced from the International Biathlon Union.

=== Olympic Games ===
0 medals

Event	Individual	Sprint	Pursuit	Mass start	Relay	Mixed relay
(Italy) 2026 Milano Cortina	—	63rd	—	—	16th	—

=== World Cup ===
Season	Overall			Individual		Sprint		Pursuit		Mass start	
Season	Races	Points	Position	Points	Position	Points	Position	Points	Position	Points	Position
2025–26	/21										
