= Hennadiy Nykon =

Ukrainian cross-country skier (born 1975)

Personal information
- Nationality: Ukrainian
- Born: 16 April 1975 (age 51) Sumy, Ukraine

Sport
- Sport: Cross-country skiing
Medal record
Men's cross-country skiing
Representing Ukraine
Winter Universiade
Bronze medal – third place	1995 Jaca	Relay
Bronze medal – third place	1997 Muju	Relay

Hennadiy Nykon (born 16 April 1975) is a Ukrainian cross-country skier. He competed in the men's 10 kilometre classical event at the 1998 Winter Olympics.
