= Mara Urbani =

Italian speed skater

Personal information
- Nationality: Italian
- Born: 2 June 1976 (age 50) Bormio, Italy

Sport
- Sport: Short track speed skating
Medal record
Women's short track speed skating
Representing Italy
World Team Championships
Gold medal – first place	1993 Budapest	Team
Silver medal – second place	1996 Lake Placid	Team
Bronze medal – third place	1994 Cambridge	Team

Mara Urbani (born 2 June 1976) is an Italian short track speed skater. She competed at the 1994 Winter Olympics and the 1998 Winter Olympics.
