= Anke Jannie Landman =

Dutch speed skater (born 1974)

Personal information
- Nationality: Dutch
- Born: 8 October 1974 (age 51) Assen, Netherlands

Sport
- Sport: Short track speed skating

Anke Jannie Landman (born 8 October 1974) is a Dutch short track speed skater. She competed at the 1994 Winter Olympics and the 1998 Winter Olympics.
