= Mykola Krupnyk =

Ukrainian biathlete (born 1972)

Personal information
- Nationality: Ukrainian
- Born: 2 September 1972 (age 53) Kyiv, Ukrainian SSR, Soviet Union

Sport
- Sport: Biathlon
Medal record
Men's biathlon
Representing Ukraine
Winter Universiade
Silver medal – second place	1999 Poprad	Relay

Mykola Krupnyk (born 2 September 1972) is a Ukrainian biathlete. He competed in the men's 20 km individual event during the 1998 Winter Olympics.
