= Igor Urbanski =

Ukrainian luger (born 1970)

Ihor Urbanskiy
Personal information
- Nationality: Ukrainian
- Born: 16 July 1970 (age 54); Kyiv, Ukrainian SSR, Soviet Union

Sport
- Sport: Luge

Ihor Urbansky (born 16 July 1970 in Kyiv, Ukrainian SSR, Soviet Union) is a Ukrainian luger who competed in the mid to late 1990s. Competing in two Winter Olympics, he earned his best finish of seventh in the men's doubles event at Nagano in 1998.
