= Danylo Panchenko =

Ukrainian luger (born 1973)

Personal information
- Nationality: Ukrainian
- Born: 15 August 1973 (age 51); Lviv, Ukraine

Sport
- Sport: Luge

Danylo Panchenko (born 15 August 1973) is a Ukrainian luger. He competed at the 1998 Winter Olympics and the 2002 Winter Olympics.
