= Roman Pryma =

Ukrainian biathlete (born 1981)

Personal information
- Nationality: Ukrainian
- Born: 6 November 1981 (age 44) Chernihiv, Ukraine

Sport
- Sport: Biathlon
Medal record
Men's biathlon
Representing Ukraine
European Championships
Silver medal – second place	2002 Kontiolahti	4 × 7.5 km relay
Winter Universiade
Silver medal – second place	2005 Innsbruck	15 km mass start
Silver medal – second place	2005 Innsbruck	Relay
Silver medal – second place	2007 Turin	Relay
Bronze medal – third place	2003 Tarvisio	Relay
Bronze medal – third place	2007 Turin	20 km individual

Roman Pryma (born 6 November 1981) is a Ukrainian biathlete. He competed in the men's sprint event at the 2002 Winter Olympics.
