= Yevhen Yakovlev =

Ukrainian speed skater

Personal information
- Nationality: Ukrainian
- Born: 30 April 1977 (age 49) Kharkiv, Ukraine

Sport
- Sport: Short track speed skating
Medal record
Men's short track speed skating
Representing Ukraine
European Championships
Bronze medal – third place	2005 Turin	5000m relay

Yevhen Yakovlev (born 30 April 1977) is a Ukrainian short track speed skater. He competed in two events at the 1998 Winter Olympics.
