= Mykola Popovych =

Ukrainian cross-country skier (born 1971)

Personal information
- Nationality: Ukrainian
- Born: 3 May 1971 (age 55) Ivano-Frankivsk, Ukraine

Sport
- Sport: Cross-country skiing
Medal record
Men's cross-country skiing
Representing Ukraine
Winter Universiade
Bronze medal – third place	1995 Jaca	30 km mass start
Bronze medal – third place	1995 Jaca	Relay
Bronze medal – third place	1997 Muju	30 km mass start
Bronze medal – third place	1997 Muju	Relay

Mykola Popovych (born 3 May 1971) is a Ukrainian cross-country skier. He competed in the men's 10 kilometre classical event at the 1998 Winter Olympics.
