= Maryna Pestryakova =

Ukrainian cross-country skier (born 1972)

Personal information
- Nationality: Ukrainian
- Born: 26 January 1972 (age 54) Tomsk, Soviet Union

Sport
- Sport: Cross-country skiing
Medal record
Women's cross-country skiing
Representing Ukraine
Winter Universiade
Gold medal – first place	1993 Zakopane	Relay
Bronze medal – third place	1999 Poprad	Relay

Maryna Pestryakova (born 26 January 1972) is a Ukrainian cross-country skier. She competed at the 1998 Winter Olympics and the 2002 Winter Olympics.
