= 2001 Winter Universiade =

Multi-sport event in Zakopane, Poland

Coordinates: 49.3°N 19.966°E

XX Winter Universiade XX Zimowa Uniwersjada
- Host city: Zakopane, Poland
- Nations: 41
- Athletes: 1,543
- Events: 9 sports
- Opening: February 7, 2001
- Closing: February 17, 2001
- Opened by: Aleksander Kwaśniewski
- Main venue: Wielka Krokiew
- Website: universiade2001.zakopane.pl/ (archived)

The 2001 Winter Universiade, the XX Winter Universiade, took place in Zakopane, Poland.

== Medal table ==
* Host nation (Poland)

Rank	Nation	Gold	Silver	Bronze	Total
1	Russia (RUS)	14	9	8	31
2	South Korea (KOR)	8	4	2	14
3	Poland (POL)*	8	3	3	14
4	Slovenia (SLO)	6	4	3	13
5	Switzerland (SUI)	5	3	3	11
6	Japan (JPN)	3	2	5	10
7	Austria (AUT)	2	4	3	9
8	Slovakia (SVK)	2	1	3	6
9	Belarus (BLR)	1	4	4	9
10	Bulgaria (BUL)	1	3	1	5
11	Ukraine (UKR)	1	1	2	4
12	United States (USA)	1	0	0	1
13	China (CHN)	0	3	5	8
14	Italy (ITA)	0	3	3	6
15	Finland (FIN)	0	2	2	4
16	France (FRA)	0	2	0	2
17	Canada (CAN)	0	1	0	1
17	Hungary (HUN)	0	1	0	1
17	Spain (ESP)	0	1	0	1
17	Sweden (SWE)	0	1	0	1
21	Czech Republic (CZE)	0	0	2	2
22	Germany (GER)	0	0	1	1
22	Great Britain (GBR)	0	0	1	1
Totals (23 entries)		52	52	51	155

=== Sports ===
- Alpine skiing (8)
- Biathlon (8)
- Cross-country skiing (8)
- Figure skating (4)
- Ice hockey (1)
- Nordic combined (2)
- Short track speed skating (10)
- Ski jumping (3)
- Snowboarding (8)
