= Nataliya Sverchikova =

Ukrainian speed skater

Personal information
- Nationality: Ukrainian
- Born: 6 June 1974 (age 52) Kyiv, Ukraine

Sport
- Sport: Short track speed skating

Nataliya Sverchikova (born 6 June 1974) is a Ukrainian short track speed skater. She competed in two events at the 1998 Winter Olympics.
