= Olexander Bilanenko =

Ukrainian biathlete (born 1978)

Personal information
- Full name: Olexander Viktorovich Bilanenko
- Born: 8 January 1978 (age 48) Sumy, Ukrainian SSR, Soviet Union
- Height: 1.83 m (6 ft 0 in)

Sport
- Sport: Skiing
- Club: ZSU

World Cup career
- Seasons: 1999–2000 – 2013–14
Medal record
Men's biathlon
Representing Ukraine
World Championships
Silver medal – second place	2011 Khanty-Mansiysk	4 × 7.5 km relay
European Championships
Gold medal – first place	2003 Forni Avoltri	Individual
Silver medal – second place	2002 Kontiolahti	Relay
Silver medal – second place	2005 Novosibirsk	Relay
Silver medal – second place	2006 Langdorf	Relay
Winter Universiade
Gold medal – first place	2003 Tarvisio	20 km individual
Gold medal – first place	2005 Innsbruck	20 km individual
Silver medal – second place	1999 Poprad	Relay
Silver medal – second place	2005 Innsbruck	10 km sprint
Bronze medal – third place	1997 Muju	Relay
Bronze medal – third place	2003 Tarvisio	Relay
Bronze medal – third place	2005 Innsbruck	12.5 km pursuit
- Updated on 26 December 2014

Olexander Viktorovich Bilanenko (Ukrainian: Олександр Вікторович Біланенко) (born 8 January 8, 1978) is a former Ukrainian biathlete.

He retired from the sport at the end of the 2013–14 season.

== Performances ==
Level	Year	Event	IN	SP	PU	MS	RL	MRL
BWCH	2000	Oslo, Norway; Lahti, Finland	69	49	44		8	
EBCH	2001	Maurienne, France	DNF	22	DNS		4	
BWCH	2001	Pokljuka, Slovenia	41	51	53		13	
OLY	2002	Salt Lake City, United States	68				7	
EBCH	2002	Kontiolahti, Finland	33				2	
EBCH	2003	Forni Avoltri, Italy	1				5	
BWCH	2003	Khanty-Mansiysk, Russia	53	46	DNS		10	
BWCH	2004	Oberhof, Germany	8	9	27	8	7	
EBCH	2004	Minsk, Belarus	8	12	12		DSQ	
EBCH	2005	Novosibirsk, Russia	DNF	10	8		2	
BWCH	2005	Hochfilzen, Austria	67	67		9	10	
OLY	2006	Turin, Italy	49	34	DNS		7	
EBCH	2006	Langdorf, Germany	6	7	DNF		2	
BWCH	2007	Rasen-Antholz, Italy	18	21	38	19	8	
EBCH	2007	Bansko, Bulgaria	8	13	DNS		4	
BWCH	2008	Östersund, Sweden		44	46		10	
EBCH	2008	Nové Město na Moravě, Czech Republic	42				6	
BWCH	2009	Pyeongchang, South Korea	16	76			5	11
OLY	2010	Vancouver, Canada	22				8	
BWCH	2011	Khanty-Mansiysk, Russia		25	42		2	8
BWCH	2012	Ruhpolding, Germany	58					
BWCH	2013	Nové Město na Moravě, Czech Republic	73					

=== World Cup ===
==== Podiums ====
Season	Place	Competition	Placement
2000-01	Hochfilzen, Austria	Relay	2

==== Positions ====
Season	Individual	Sprint	Pursuit	Mass starts	TOTAL
1999-00	40				63
2000-01	58				78
2001-02		73	74		84
2002-03		45			58
2003-04	22	45	42	26	36
2004-05	32	27	19	16	20
2005-06		79	71		87
2006-07	41	48	57	36	48
2007-08	24	71			58
2008-09	20	70	57		55
2009-10	31	97	70		68
2010-11	54	64	53		61
2011-12	47	72	56		58
2012-13		66	55		67
