= 1995 Winter Universiade =

Multi-sport event in Jaca, Spain

XVII Winter Universiade XVII Universiada de invierno
- Host city: Jaca, Spain
- Events: 9 sports
- Opening: February 18, 1995
- Closing: February 26, 1995
- Opened by: Juan Carlos I

The 1995 Winter Universiade, the XVII Winter Universiade, took place in Jaca, Spain.For the first time, Snowboarding was an optional sport during these games.

== Medal table ==
* Host nation (Spain)

| Rank | Nation | Gold | Silver | Bronze | Total |
|---|---|---|---|---|---|
| 1 | South Korea (KOR) | 6 | 4 | 4 | 14 |
| 2 | Russia (RUS) | 6 | 3 | 2 | 11 |
| 3 | United States (USA) | 4 | 2 | 6 | 12 |
| 4 | Japan (JPN) | 3 | 5 | 6 | 14 |
| 5 | China (CHN) | 3 | 4 | 3 | 10 |
| 6 | Sweden (SWE) | 2 | 1 | 2 | 5 |
| 7 | Kazakhstan (KAZ) | 2 | 0 | 1 | 3 |
| 7 | Switzerland (SUI) | 2 | 0 | 1 | 3 |
| 9 | Belarus (BLR) | 2 | 0 | 0 | 2 |
| 9 | Spain (ESP)* | 2 | 0 | 0 | 2 |
| 11 | France (FRA) | 1 | 4 | 2 | 7 |
| 12 | Italy (ITA) | 1 | 4 | 1 | 6 |
| 13 | Canada (CAN) | 1 | 0 | 2 | 3 |
| 14 | Austria (AUT) | 1 | 0 | 1 | 2 |
| 15 | Slovenia (SLO) | 0 | 3 | 1 | 4 |
| 16 | Poland (POL) | 0 | 3 | 0 | 3 |
| 17 | Czech Republic (CZE) | 0 | 2 | 0 | 2 |
| 18 | Finland (FIN) | 0 | 1 | 0 | 1 |
| 19 | Ukraine (UKR) | 0 | 0 | 4 | 4 |
| Totals (19 entries) | | 36 | 36 | 36 | 108 |

=== Sports ===
- Alpine skiing (8)
- Cross-country skiing (8)
- Figure skating (4)
- Ice hockey (1)
- Nordic combined (1)
- Short track speed skating (10)
- Ski jumping (2)
- Snowboarding (4)
