= 2005 Winter Universiade =

Multi-sport event in Innsbruck and Seefeld, Austria

XXII Winter Universiade XXII Winter-Universiade
- Slogan: "u better be there"
- Host city: Innsbruck and Seefeld, Austria
- Nations: 53 (estimated)
- Athletes: 1,500
- Events: 13 sports
- Opening: January 12, 2005
- Closing: January 22, 2005
- Opened by: Heinz Fischer
- Main venue: Olympia World Innsbruck-Olympic Stadium

The 2005 Winter Universiade, the XXII Winter Universiade, took place in Innsbruck and Seefeld, Austria. South Korea won 23 medals, the most of any of the participating nations.

== Venues ==
=== Innsbruck ===
Venue	Sports	Capacity	Ref.
Bergiselschanze	Ski jumping	28,000	
Tivoli-Neu	Opening Ceremony	35,000	
Kühtai	Freestyle skiing, Snowboarding	8,000	
Tyrolean Ice Arena	Ice hockey	8,000	
Eisschnellaufbahn	Speed skating	4,000	
Olympiahalle	Figure skating, Short track	10,600	

=== Seefeld ===
Venue	Sports	Capacity	Ref.
Patscherkofel	Alpine skiing	8,000	
Seefeld Arena	Biathlon, Cross-country skiing, Nordic combined, Ski jumping	12,000	
Seefeld Hockey Center	Ice hockey	5,000 (temporary)	

=== Sports ===
- Alpine skiing (8)
- Biathlon (10)
- Cross-country skiing (8)
- Figure skating (4)
- Freestyle skiing (2)
- Ice hockey (1)
- Nordic combined (3)
- Short track speed skating (10)
- Skeleton (2)
- Ski jumping (4)
- Snowboarding (8)
- Speed skating (10)

== Medal table ==
* Host nation (Austria)

Rank	Nation	Gold	Silver	Bronze	Total
1	Austria (AUT)*	10	8	4	22
2	South Korea (KOR)	10	7	6	23
3	Russia (RUS)	7	5	9	21
4	Japan (JPN)	5	6	6	17
5	Poland (POL)	5	2	1	8
6	Ukraine (UKR)	4	10	2	16
7	Kazakhstan (KAZ)	4	1	2	7
8	Italy (ITA)	4	0	5	9
9	China (CHN)	3	6	8	17
10	Netherlands (NED)	3	5	2	10
11	Slovenia (SLO)	3	4	3	10
12	Czech Republic (CZE)	3	2	4	9
13	France (FRA)	2	1	4	7
14	Switzerland (SUI)	1	3	3	7
15	Finland (FIN)	1	2	2	5
16	Great Britain (GBR)	1	2	0	3
16	Serbia and Montenegro (SCG)	1	2	0	3
16	United States (USA)	1	2	0	3
19	Germany (GER)	1	1	3	5
20	Belarus (BLR)	0	3	2	5
21	Slovakia (SVK)	0	0	2	2
22	Bulgaria (BUL)	0	0	1	1
Totals (22 entries)		69	72	69	210
