= Ukraine at the 2011 Winter Universiade =

- IOC code: UKR
- NOC: Sports Students Union of Ukraine
- Website: osvitasport.org

in Erzurum, Turkey 27 January 2011 – 6 February 2011
- Competitors: 78 in 8 sports
- Medals Ranked 3rd: Gold 6 Silver 5 Bronze 4 Total 15

Winter Universiade appearances (overview)
- 1993; 1995; 1997; 1999; 2001; 2003; 2005; 2007; 2009; 2011; 2013; 2015; 2017; 2019; 2023; 2025

Ukraine competed at the 2011 Winter Universiade in Erzurum, Turkey. 78 Ukrainian athletes (ninth largest team behind Russia, Turkey, Canada, Japan, South Korea, Finland, Czech Republic, and United States) competed in 8 sports out of 11 except for curling, freestyle skiing, and ice hockey. Ukraine won 15 medals, 6 of which were gold, and ranked 3rd behind Russia and South Korea.

== Medallists ==
| Medal | Name | Sport | Event |
|---|---|---|---|
| Gold | Artem Pryma | Biathlon | Men's 10 km sprint |
| Gold | Sergii Semenov | Biathlon | Men's 12.5 km pursuit |
| Gold | Artem Pryma | Biathlon | Men's 15 km mass start |
| Gold | Vita Semerenko | Biathlon | Women's 7.5 km sprint |
| Gold | Vita Semerenko | Biathlon | Women's 10 km pursuit |
| Gold | Svitlana Krykonchuk; Vita Semerenko; Artem Pryma; Sergii Semenov | Biathlon | Mixed relay |
| Silver | Sergii Semenov | Biathlon | Men's 10 km sprint |
| Silver | Artem Pryma | Biathlon | Men's 12.5 km pursuit |
| Silver | Kateryna Grygorenko | Cross-country skiing | Women's 5 kilometre classical |
| Silver | Kateryna Grygorenko; Maryna Antsybor; Zoya Zaviedieieva | Cross-country skiing | Women's 3 x 5 kilometre relay |
| Silver | Annamari Chundak | Snowboarding | Women's parallel giant slalom |
| Bronze | Kateryna Grygorenko | Cross-country skiing | Women's 10 kilometre pursuit |
| Bronze | Kateryna Grygorenko | Cross-country skiing | Women's 15 kilometre freestyle |
| Bronze | Ivan Bilosyuk; Kateryna Grygorenko | Cross-country skiing | Mixed team sprint |
| Bronze | Nadezhda Frolenkova; Mikhail Kasalo | Figure skating | Ice dancing |

== Alpine skiing ==
The team included two Olympians (Rostyslav Feshchuk and Bohdana Matsotska).

Men

| Athlete | Event | Result | |
| Athlete | Event | Time | Rank |
|---|---|---|---|
| Rostyslav Feshchuk | Giant slalom | DNS2 | |
| Rostyslav Feshchuk | Super-G | DNF | |
| Rostyslav Feshchuk | Combined | DNF1 | |

Women

| Athlete | Event | Result | |
| Athlete | Event | Time | Rank |
|---|---|---|---|
| Bohdana Matsotska | Combined | 1:57.11 | 19 |
| Bohdana Matsotska | Super-G | 1:16.39 | 48 |
| Bohdana Matsotska | Giant slalom | 1:59.97 | 43 |
| Bohdana Matsotska | Slalom | 1:49.56 | 17 |

== Biathlon ==
The team included 2 Olympians (Serhiy Semenov and Vita Semerenko).

Men

| Athlete | Event | Time | Misses | Rank |
|---|---|---|---|---|
| Serhiy Semenov | Individual | 1:00:10.1 | 4 (2+1+0+1) | 5 |
| Oleg Berezhnyy | Individual | 1:00:27.1 | 2 (1+0+1+0) | 7 |
| Artem Pryma | Individual | 1:00:56.5 | 3 (2+0+0+1) | 8 |
| Anton Yunak | Individual | 1:02:53.3 | 3 (0+1+0+2) | 11 |
| Andriy Voznyak | Individual | 1:04:44.9 | 4 (2+0+1+1) | 20 |
| Mykhaylo Serdyuk | Individual | 1:05:45.1 | 6 (2+2+1+1) | 23 |
| Artem Pryma | Sprint | 28:25.3 | 0 (0+0) | 1st place, gold medalist(s) |
| Serhiy Semenov | Sprint | 28:31.7 | 0 (0+0) | 2nd place, silver medalist(s) |
| Oleg Berezhnyy | Sprint | 28:50.2 | 0 (0+0) | 4 |
| Anton Yunak | Sprint | 29:53.2 | 1 (0+1) | 12 |
| Andriy Voznyak | Sprint | 31:03.1 | 2 (0+2) | 21 |
| Vitaliy Kozhushko | Sprint | 31:43.4 | 2 (1+1) | 25 |
| Serhiy Semenov | Pursuit | 36:08.6 | 3 (1+0+1+1) | 1st place, gold medalist(s) |
| Artem Pryma | Pursuit | +13.1 | 3 (0+3+0+0) | 2nd place, silver medalist(s) |
| Oleg Berezhnyy | Pursuit | +52.4 | 3 (1+0+1+1) | 4 |
| Anton Yunak | Pursuit | +2:02.5 | 2 (1+0+0+1) | 8 |
| Andriy Voznyak | Pursuit | +4:59.6 | 5 (0+2+1+2) | 19 |
| Vitaliy Kozhushko | Pursuit | +5:30.7 | 2 (0+0+1+1) | 20 |
| Artem Pryma | Mass start | 41:22.2 | 1 (0+1+0+0) | 1st place, gold medalist(s) |
| Serhiy Semenov | Mass start | +39.2 | 3 (1+1+1+0) | 4 |
| Oleg Berezhnyy | Mass start | +44.9 | 2 (0+0+1+1) | 5 |
| Andriy Voznyak | Mass start | +2:43.6 | 3 (0+2+0+1) | 14 |
| Vitaliy Kozhushko | Mass start | +3:16.5 | 4 (1+0+2+1) | 18 |

Women

| Athlete | Event | Time | Misses | Rank |
|---|---|---|---|---|
| Svitlana Krykonchuk | Individual | 50:48.1 | 1 (0+1+0+0) | 7 |
| Iryna Pipkun | Individual | 52:08.6 | 2 (0+1+1+0) | 10 |
| Olga Poleshchykova | Individual | 53:57.8 | 1 (0+0+1+0) | 16 |
| Nina Karasevych | Individual | 55:10.3 | 4 (1+1+1+1) | 21 |
| Kateryna Tseselska | Individual | 59:56.7 | 11 (2+2+4+3) | 28 |
| Vita Semerenko | Individual | Did not start | | |
| Vita Semerenko | Sprint | 23:39.5 | 1 (1+0) | 1st place, gold medalist(s) |
| Nina Karasevych | Sprint | 25:44.8 | 1 (0+1) | 12 |
| Svitlana Krykonchuk | Sprint | 26:18.2 | 1 (1+0) | 16 |
| Kateryna Tseselska | Sprint | 27:14.8 | 5 (2+3) | 18 |
| Olga Poleshchykova | Sprint | 27:55.7 | 2 (2+0) | 24 |
| Iryna Pipkun | Sprint | 27:55.8 | 4 (1+3) | 25 |
| Vita Semerenko | Pursuit | 32:16.3 | 4 (0+2+1+1) | 1st place, gold medalist(s) |
| Svitlana Krykonchuk | Pursuit | +5:03.7 | 2 (0+0+1+1) | 12 |
| Kateryna Tseselska | Pursuit | +6:41.6 | 6 (0+1+2+3) | 17 |
| Olga Poleshchykova | Pursuit | +4:16 | 2 (1+1) | Lapped |
| Iryna Pipkun | Pursuit | +4:16 | 7 (2+5) | Lapped |
| Nina Karasevych | Pursuit | Did not start | | |
| Svitlana Krykonchuk | Mass start | +1:19.6 | 1 (1+0+0+0) | 4 |
| Kateryna Tseselska | Mass start | +2:54.2 | 7 (0+1+4+2) | 11 |
| Iryna Pipkun | Mass start | +3:31.0 | 4 (0+0+3+1) | 12 |
| Olga Poleshchykova | Mass start | +4:22.6 | 1 (0+0+1+0) | 14 |
| Nina Karasevych | Mass start | Did not finish | | 2 (0+1+0+1) |
| Vita Semerenko | Mass start | Did not start | | |

Mixed

| Athlete | Event | Time | Misses | Rank |
|---|---|---|---|---|
| Svitlana Krykonchuk; Vita Semerenko; Artem Pryma; Serhiy Semenov | Relay | 1:24:58.6 | 0+7 | 1st place, gold medalist(s) |

== Figure skating ==
| Athlete | Event | SP | | FS | | Total | |
| Athlete | Event | Points | Rank | Points | Rank | Points | Rank |
|---|---|---|---|---|---|---|---|
| Stanislav Pertsov | Men's singles | 59.50 | 9 | 101.66 | 14 | 161.16 | 12 |
| Dmytro Ihnatenko | Men's singles | 45.02 | 17 | 95.35 | 17 | 140.37 | 17 |
| Iryna Movchan | Ladies' singles | 39.40 | 16 | 69.62 | 14 | 109.02 | 16 |
| Nadiia Frolenkova; Mykhailo Kasalo | Ice dance | 47.90 | 8 | 74.06 | 3 | 121.96 | 3rd place, bronze medalist(s) |
| Iryna Babchenko; Vitali Nikiforov | Ice dance | 44.25 | 9 | 63.44 | 9 | 107.69 | 9 |
| Xenia Chepizhko; Serhiy Shevchenko | Ice dance | 28.83 | 15 | 57.02 | 12 | 85.85 | 13 |

== Nordic combined ==
The team included one Olympian (Volodymyr Trachuk).

Men

| Athlete | Event | Total | |
| Athlete | Event | Time/Points | Rank |
|---|---|---|---|
| Volodymyr Trachuk | Individual Gundersen | 30:03.9 | 13 |
| Andriy Parkhomchuk | Individual Gundersen | 31:23.3 | 21 |
| Oleksiy Khomyn | Individual Gundersen | 33:49.8 | 26 |
| Volodymyr Trachuk | Mass start | | 7 |
| Andriy Parkhomchuk | Mass start | | 15 |
| Oleksiy Khomyn | Mass start | | 23 |
| Oleksiy Khomyn; Andriy Parkhomchuk; Volodymyr Trachuk | Team Gundersen | DNS | |

== Short track speed skating ==
Ukraine was represented by 4 athletes.

Men

| Athlete | Event | Prel. Heat | | Heat | | Quarterfinal | | Semifinal | | Final | |
| Athlete | Event | Time | Rank | Time | Rank | Time | Rank | Time | Rank | Time | Rank |
|---|---|---|---|---|---|---|---|---|---|---|---|
| Oleksiy Koshelenko | 500 m | 44.454 | 2 Q | 51.242 | 3 | Did not advance | | | | | |
| Oleksiy Koshelenko | 1000 m | 1:31.080 | 3 | Did not advance | | | | | | | |
| Oleksiy Koshelenko | 1500 m | —N/a | | 2:24.175 | 2 Q | —N/a | | 2:36.031 | 5 | Did not advance | |
| Ievgen Gutenkov | 500 m | 43.467 | 2 Q | 44.835 | 5 | Did not advance | | | | | |
| Ievgen Gutenkov | 1000 m | 1:33.684 | 3 | Did not advance | | | | | | | |
| Ievgen Gutenkov | 1500 m | —N/a | | 2:23.344 | 6 | —N/a | | Did not advance | | | |
| Dmytro Poltavets | 500 m | 44.126 | 2 Q | 44.100 | 4 | Did not advance | | | | | |
| Dmytro Poltavets | 1000 m | 1:31.388 | 2 Q | 1:30.397 | 4 | Did not advance | | | | | |
| Dmytro Poltavets | 1500 m | —N/a | | 2:21.330 | 5 | —N/a | | Did not advance | | | |
| Serhiy Lifyrenko | 500 m | 45.049 | 4 | Did not advance | | | | | | | |
| Serhiy Lifyrenko | 1000 m | 1:32.272 | 3 ADV | 1:31.501 | 4 | Did not advance | | | | | |
| Serhiy Lifyrenko | 1500 m | —N/a | | 2:24.141 | 6 | —N/a | | Did not advance | | | |
| Dmytro Poltavets; Ievgen Gutenkov; Serhiy Lifyrenko; Oleksiy Koshelenko | 5000 m relay | —N/a | | | | 7:10.809 | 3 q | 7:09.462 | 3 | Did not advance | |

== Ski jumping ==
The team included one Olympian (Oleksandr Lazarovych).

Men

| Athlete | Event | Jump 1 | | Jump 2 | | Total | |
| Athlete | Event | Distance | Points | Distance | Points | Points | Rank |
|---|---|---|---|---|---|---|---|
| Oleksandr Lazarovych | Men's normal hill | DNS | | | | | |
| Oleksandr Lazarovych | Men's large hill | DNS | | | | | |

== Snowboarding ==
The team included two OLympians (Annamari Dancha and Yosyf Penyak).

Snowboard cross

| Athlete | Event | Qualification | | | | | | Quarterfinals | Semifinals | Final | |
| Athlete | Event | Run 1 | | Run 2 | | Best | | Position | Position | Position | Rank |
| Athlete | Event | Time | Rank | Time | Rank | Time | Rank | Position | Position | Position | Rank |
|---|---|---|---|---|---|---|---|---|---|---|---|
| Olha Fedak | Women's | 1:05.54 | 12 | 57.81 | 13 | 57.81 | 13 Q | 3 | Did not advance | | |

Parallel

| Athlete | Event | Qualification | | Round of 16 | Quarterfinal | Semifinal | Final | |
| Athlete | Event | Time | Rank | Opposition Time | Opposition Time | Opposition Time | Opposition Time | Rank |
|---|---|---|---|---|---|---|---|---|
| Yosyf Penyak | Men's parallel giant slalom | 1:16.76 | 11 Q | (Germany) Deubl; W | (South Korea) Kim; L +0.18 | Did not advance | | 7 |
| Taras Bihus | Men's parallel giant slalom | 1:18.77 | 21 | Did not advance | | | | |
| Volodymyr Stipakhno | Men's parallel giant slalom | 1:19.45 | 24 | Did not advance | | | | |
| Annamari Dancha | Women's parallel giant slalom | 1:22.50 | 3 Q | (Serbia) Micić; W | (Germany) Kummer; W | (Slovenia) Kotnik; W | (Germany) Jörg; L +0.62 | 2nd place, silver medalist(s) |
| Olena Rykhlivska | Women's parallel giant slalom | 1:27.87 | 16 | (Austria) Dujmovits; L +8.00 | Did not advance | | | |
| Olha Fedak | Women's parallel giant slalom | Did not finish | | Did not advance | | | | |

== See also ==
- Ukraine at the 2011 Summer Universiade

== Sources ==
- Archive of the official web site
- Results in skiing events
- Biathlon men's individual
- Biathlon men's sprint
- Biathlon men's pursuit
- Biathlon men's mass start
- Biathlon women's individual
- Biathlon women's sprint
- Biathlon women's pursuit
- Biathlon women's mass start
- Biathlon mixed relay
