= 2014 World Team Challenge =

The 13th World Team Challenge 2014 (officially: R(H)EINPOWER-Biathlon-WTC 14) was a biathlon competition, that was held at December 27, 2014, at the Veltins-Arena in Gelsenkirchen, Germany. The winners were Valj Semerenko and Serhiy Semenov from Ukraine, and it was second victory for this country after Ukrainian team had won it in 2008.

== Participants ==
20 sportsmen (10 male, 10 female) competed as mixed teams. 9 countries were represented at this event since the host country was represented by two teams.

== Results ==
Rank	Name	Country	Time
1	Valj Semerenko / Serhiy Semenov	Ukraine	31:03,2
2	Franziska Hildebrand / Erik Lesser	Germany II	+0:07,7
3	Yana Romanova / Evgeniy Garanichev	Russia	+0:15,1
4	Gabriela Soukalová / Ondřej Moravec	Czech Republic	+0:19,4
5	Anaïs Chevalier / Martin Fourcade	France	+0:26,3
6	Laura Dahlmeier / Florian Graf	Germany I	+0:35,1
7	Fanny Horn / Lars Helge Birkeland	Norway	+0:36,8
8	Katharina Innerhofer / Dominik Landertinger	Austria	+1:01,2
9	Dorothea Wierer / Lukas Hofer	Italy	+1:03,5
10	Elisa Gasparin / Benjamin Weger	Switzerland	+3:16,9
