= Brazil at the 2011 Winter Universiade =

- IOC code: BRA
- NOC: Brazilian University Sports Confederation
- Website: www.cbdu.org.br

in Erzurum
- Competitors: 4 in 2 sports
- Medals: Gold 0 Silver 0 Bronze 0 Total 0

Winter Universiade appearances (overview)
- 1960; 1962; 1964; 1966; 1968; 1972; 1978; 1981; 1983; 1985; 1987; 1989; 1991; 1993; 1995; 1997; 1999; 2001; 2003; 2005; 2007; 2009; 2011; 2013; 2015; 2017; 2019; 2023; 2025

Brazil competed at the 2011 Winter Universiade in Erzurum, Turkey. Brazil sent 4 athletes, the most ever sent by Brazil.

== Alpine skiing ==
Brazil sent one male alpine skier.

Men

- Paulo Setubal

== Figure skating ==
Men

Athlete(s)	Event	SP/SP		FS/LP		Total	
Athlete(s)	Event	Points	Rank	Points	Rank	Points	Rank
Kevin Alves	Men's	43.25	18th	91.17	19th	134.42	19th

Women

Athlete(s)	Event	SP/SP		FS/LP		Total	
Athlete(s)	Event	Points	Rank	Points	Rank	Points	Rank
Alessia Baldo	Women's	19.86	29th	39.42	30th	59.28	30th
Elena Rodriguez	Women's	25.72	26th	46.76	29th	72.48	28th
