= Biathlon World Championships 2016 – Men's sprint =

Men's sprint at the Biathlon World Championships 2016
- Venue: Oslo, Norway
- Date: 5 March
- Competitors: 102 from 32 nations
- Winning time: 25:35:4

Medalists
gold medal	Martin Fourcade	France
silver medal	Ole Einar Bjørndalen	Norway
bronze medal	Serhiy Semenov	Ukraine

The Men's sprint event of the Biathlon World Championships 2016 was held on 5 March 2016 at 11:30 local time.

== Results ==
Rank	Bib	Name	Nationality	Time	Penalties (P+S)	Deficit
1st place, gold medalist(s)	8	Martin Fourcade	France	25:35.4	0 (0+0)	—
2nd place, silver medalist(s)	53	Ole Einar Bjørndalen	Norway	26:02.3	0 (0+0)	+26.9
3rd place, bronze medalist(s)	69	Serhiy Semenov	Ukraine	26:03.0	0 (0+0)	+27.6
4	58	Johannes Thingnes Bø	Norway	26:10.9	1 (0+1)	+35.5
5	34	Dominik Windisch	Italy	26:14.9	1 (1+0)	+39.5
6	9	Evgeniy Garanichev	Russia	26:15.8	1 (0+1)	+40.4
7	47	Arnd Peiffer	Germany	26:17.5	0 (0+0)	+42.1
8	84	Simon Schempp	Germany	26:19.2	1 (1+0)	+43.8
9	81	Dominik Landertinger	Austria	26:21.4	1 (1+0)	+46.0
10	45	Vladimir Iliev	Bulgaria	26:27.6	1 (0+1)	+52.2
11	76	Serafin Wiestner	Switzerland	26:32.8	1 (0+1)	+57.4
12	82	Simon Desthieux	France	26:35.1	1 (0+1)	+59.7
13	33	Vladimir Chepelin	Belarus	26:43.6	1 (1+0)	+1:08.2
14	35	Tim Burke	United States	26:44.5	1 (0+1)	+1:09.1
15	83	Michal Šlesingr	Czech Republic	26:44.9	1 (1+0)	+1:09.5
16	12	Quentin Fillon Maillet	France	26:47.9	1 (1+0)	+1:12.5
17	87	Emil Hegle Svendsen	Norway	26:51.3	1 (0+1)	+1:15.9
18	91	Leif Nordgren	United States	26:52.2	0 (0+0)	+1:16.8
19	80	Erik Lesser	Germany	26:53.9	2 (0+2)	+1:18.5
20	24	Andrejs Rastorgujevs	Latvia	26:55.0	2 (0+2)	+1:19.6
21	73	Tomas Kaukėnas	Lithuania	26:55.7	1 (0+1)	+1:20.3
22	93	Artem Pryma	Ukraine	26:57.0	1 (0+1)	+1:21.6
23	30	Anton Babikov	Russia	26:58.9	0 (0+0)	+1:23.5
24	101	Michal Krčmář	Czech Republic	27:00.8	1 (1+0)	+1:25.4
25	65	Martin Otčenáš	Slovakia	27:04.2	1 (0+1)	+1:28.8
26	96	Cornel Puchianu	Romania	27:04.8	0 (0+0)	+1:29.4
27	62	Simon Eder	Austria	27:09.2	3 (1+2)	+1:33.8
28	3	Oleksander Zhyrnyi	Ukraine	27:09.9	0 (0+0)	+1:34.5
29	79	Lowell Bailey	United States	27:10.2	1 (1+0)	+1:34.8
30	43	Fredrik Lindström	Sweden	27:10.7	1 (0+1)	+1:35.3
31	75	Jesper Nelin	Sweden	27:12.2	2 (0+2)	+1:36.8
32	71	Aliaksandr Darozhka	Belarus	27:12.6	1 (0+1)	+1:37.2
33	46	Benedikt Doll	Germany	27:16.3	3 (1+2)	+1:40.9
34	61	Krasimir Anev	Bulgaria	27:16.5	2 (0+2)	+1:41.1
35	60	Brendan Green	Canada	27:19.5	1 (0+1)	+1:44.1
36	97	Julian Eberhard	Austria	27:20.3	4 (2+2)	+1:44.9
37	44	Roland Lessing	Estonia	27:20.5	1 (0+1)	+1:45.1
38	88	Kauri Kõiv	Estonia	27:21.7	0 (0+0)	+1:46.3
39	36	Jakov Fak	Slovenia	27:22.2	2 (1+1)	+1:46.8
40	32	Yan Savitskiy	Kazakhstan	27:23.3	1 (0+1)	+1:47.9
41	25	Christian De Lorenzi	Italy	27:23.6	2 (1+1)	+1:48.2
42	67	Maxim Tsvetkov	Russia	27:29.8	1 (0+1)	+1:54.4
43	20	Sean Doherty	United States	27:31.9	2 (1+1)	+1:56.5
44	27	Dmytro Pidruchnyi	Ukraine	27:32.4	2 (2+0)	+1:57.0
45	1	Anton Shipulin	Russia	27:33.1	2 (1+1)	+1:57.7
46	40	Nathan Smith	Canada	27:34.1	4 (1+3)	+1:58.7
47	99	Scott Gow	Canada	27:39.0	2 (0+2)	+2:03.6
48	100	Martin Jäger	Switzerland	27:40.1	2 (0+2)	+2:04.7
49	90	Michail Kletcherov	Bulgaria	27:41.0	0 (0+0)	+2:05.6
50	70	Klemen Bauer	Slovenia	27:42.1	2 (0+2)	+2:06.7
51	37	Sven Grossegger	Austria	27:43.8	1 (1+0)	+2:08.4
51	52	Benjamin Weger	Switzerland	27:43.8	2 (1+1)	+2:08.4
53	59	Simon Fourcade	France	27:44.1	2 (2+0)	+2:08.7
54	86	Tarjei Bø	Norway	27:44.9	4 (1+3)	+2:09.5
55	48	Olli Hiidensalo	Finland	27:47.2	1 (0+1)	+2:11.8
56	102	Thomas Bormolini	Italy	27:50.1	2 (0+2)	+2:14.7
57	26	Matej Kazár	Slovakia	27:56.5	3 (2+1)	+2:21.1
58	15	Macx Davies	Canada	27:57.4	1 (0+1)	+2:22.0
59	42	Ondřej Moravec	Czech Republic	27:58.2	3 (0+3)	+2:22.8
60	11	Jaroslav Soukup	Czech Republic	28:02.9	3 (1+2)	+2:27.5
61	14	Torstein Stenersen	Sweden	28:03.6	1 (0+1)	+2:28.2
62	19	Tomáš Hasilla	Slovakia	28:05.8	1 (0+1)	+2:30.4
63	10	Kalev Ermits	Estonia	28:10.1	3 (3+0)	+2:34.7
64	50	Mateusz Janik	Poland	28:13.9	1 (0+1)	+2:38.5
65	7	Anton Sinapov	Bulgaria	28:14.8	2 (1+1)	+2:39.4
66	18	Mario Dolder	Switzerland	28:18.0	3 (2+1)	+2:42.6
67	84	Tsukasa Kobonoki	Japan	28:20.7	1 (0+1)	+2:45.3
68	23	Mikito Tachizaki	Japan	28:23.4	0 (0+0)	+2:48.0
69	94	Erlend Bjøntegaard	Norway	28:25.5	3 (1+2)	+2:50.1
70	55	George Buta	Romania	28:27.9	1 (0+1)	+2:52.5
71	98	Miha Dovžan	Slovenia	28:29.4	2 (0+2)	+2:54.0
72	13	Vassiliy Podkorytov	Kazakhstan	28:31.1	0 (0+0)	+2:55.7
73	28	Junji Nagai	Japan	28:39.3	1 (0+1)	+3:03.9
74	5	Raman Yaliotnau	Belarus	28:41.0	4 (2+2)	+3:05.6
75	63	Lukas Hofer	Italy	28:46.5	3 (1+2)	+3:11.1
76	78	Łukasz Szczurek	Poland	28:50.3	2 (1+1)	+3:14.9
77	72	Maxim Braun	Kazakhstan	28:52.9	0 (0+0)	+3:17.5
78	22	Grzegorz Guzik	Poland	28:59.1	3 (2+1)	+3:23.7
79	89	Maksim Varabei	Belarus	29:08.2	3 (1+2)	+3:32.8
80	31	Michael Rösch	Belgium	29:12.4	3 (1+2)	+3:37.0
81	64	Remus Faur	Romania	29:20.7	2 (1+1)	+3:45.3
82	17	Sami Orpana	Finland	29:22.9	2 (0+2)	+3:47.5
83	4	Krešimir Crnković	Croatia	29:23.6	3 (1+2)	+3:48.2
84	74	Thierry Langer	Belgium	29:25.1	2 (2+0)	+3:49.7
85	16	Rok Tršan	Slovenia	29:34.0	5 (3+2)	+3:58.6
86	6	Lee In-bok	South Korea	29:53.2	4 (3+1)	+4:17.8
87	95	Vytautas Strolia	Lithuania	29:56.9	6 (2+4)	+4:21.5
88	92	Ted Armgren	Sweden	30:03.1	5 (3+2)	+4:27.7
89	66	Tuomas Grönman	Finland	30:08.3	4 (2+2)	+4:32.9
90	77	Marcel Laponder	Great Britain	30:08.9	2 (0+2)	+4:33.5
91	51	Scott Dixon	Great Britain	30:13.8	4 (1+3)	+4:38.4
92	57	Kim Jong-min	South Korea	30:22.1	3 (3+0)	+4:46.7
93	46	Roberts Slotiņš	Latvia	30:30.1	4 (1+3)	+4:54.7
94	49	Apostolos Angelis	Greece	30:40.7	3 (3+0)	+5:05.3
95	39	Karol Dombrovski	Lithuania	30:48.3	4 (1+3)	+5:12.9
96	56	Károly Gombos	Hungary	31:34.6	3 (1+2)	+5:59.2
97	38	Mehmet Üstüntaş	Turkey	31:39.3	0 (0+0)	+6:03.9
98	29	Filip Petrović	Croatia	31:45.8	5 (3+2)	+6:10.0
99	2	Emir Hrkalović	Serbia	31:54.2	3 (1+2)	+6:18.8
100	41	Aleksandrs Patrijuks	Latvia	32:01.1	5 (3+2)	+6:25.7
101	21	Ahmet Üstüntaş	Turkey	32:01.2	2 (1+1)	+6:25.8
102	54	Dejan Krsmanović	Serbia	32:41.5	5 (4+1)	+7:06.1
