= World Team Challenge =

International biathlon competition in Germany

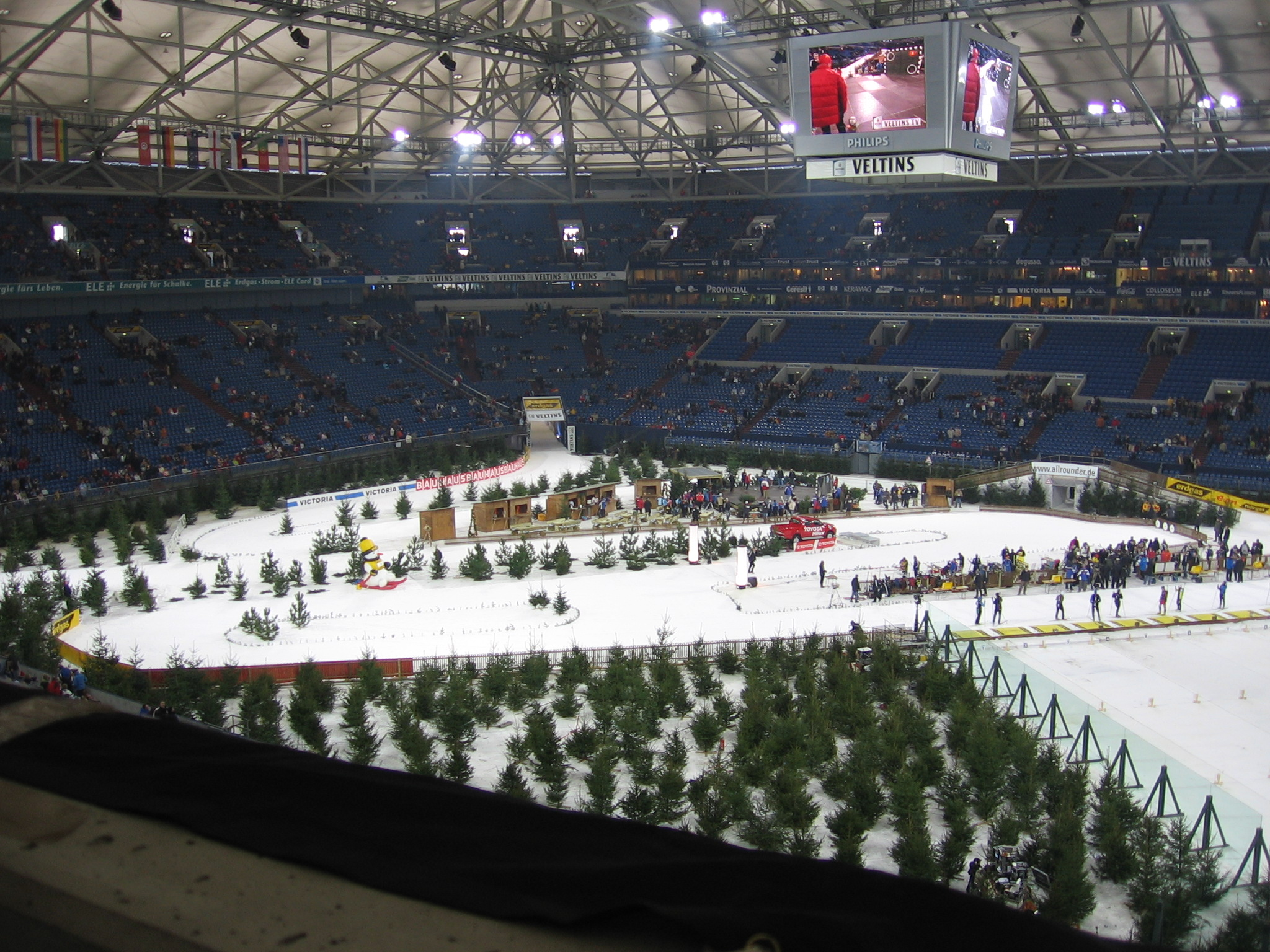
- World Team Challenge 2005
- Status: active
- Genre: sports event
- Date: December
- Frequency: annual
- Locations: Gelsenkirchen, North Rhine-Westphalia
- Country: Germany
- Inaugurated: 2002

The World Team Challenge is an international biathlon competition, which has been held every year between Christmas and New Year since 2002 in Veltins-Arena in Gelsenkirchen. Previously a similar competition was held at the same time of year in Ruhpolding, but since 2001 the venue was changed due to financial troubles. The competition isn't part of the World Cup.

== Statistics ==
=== Winners by edition ===
Year	Gold	Silver	Bronze
2002	(Germany) Michael Greis / Martina Glagow	(Russia) Viktor Maigourov / Albina Akhatova	(Finland) Vesa Hietalahti / Sanna-Leena Perunka
2003	(Norway) Ole Einar Bjørndalen / Gunn Margit Andreassen	(Germany) Michael Greis / Katja Beer	(Germany) Ricco Groß / Kati Wilhelm
2004	(Norway) Ole Einar Bjørndalen / Liv Kjersti Eikeland	(France) Vincent Defrasne / Sandrine Bailly	(Poland) Tomasz Sikora / Magdalena Gwizdoń
2005	(Norway) Ole Einar Bjørndalen / Linda Tjørhom	(Russia) Sergey Rozhkov / Olga Zaitseva	(France) Vincent Defrasne / Sandrine Bailly
2006	(Norway) Ole Einar Bjørndalen / Linda Grubben	(France) Julien Robert / Florence Baverel-Robert	(Germany) Michael Greis / Martina Glagow
2007	(Russia) Dmitri Yaroshenko / Ekaterina Iourieva	(Norway) Ole Einar Bjørndalen / Tora Berger	(Germany) Michael Greis / Anne Preußler
2008	(Ukraine) Andriy Deryzemlya / Oksana Khvostenko	(Austria) Christoph Sumann / (Germany) Martina Beck	(Russia) Dmitri Yaroshenko / Ekaterina Iourieva
2009	(Austria) Christoph Sumann / (Germany) Kati Wilhelm	(Ukraine) Andriy Deryzemlya / Oksana Khvostenko	(France) Vincent Defrasne / Marie-Laure Brunet
2010 ^{a}	(Russia) Evgeny Ustyugov / Svetlana Sleptsova	(Germany) Florian Graf / Kathrin Hitzer	(Germany) Michael Greis / Andrea Henkel
2011	(Sweden) Carl Johan Bergman / (Finland) Kaisa Mäkäräinen	(Ukraine) Serhiy Sednev / Valentyna Semerenko	(Sweden) Björn Ferry / Helena Ekholm
2012	(Russia) Anton Shipulin / Ekaterina Yurlova	(France) Martin Fourcade / Marie Dorin-Habert	(Norway) Lars Helge Birkeland / Fanny Horn
2013	(Germany) Florian Graf / Laura Dahlmeier	(Ukraine) Andriy Deryzemlya / Olena Pidhrushna	(Slovenia) Jakov Fak / Teja Gregorin
2014	(Ukraine) Serhiy Semenov / Valentina Semerenko	(Germany) Erik Lesser / Franziska Hildebrand	(Russia) Evgeniy Garanichev / Yana Romanova
2015	(France) Martin Fourcade / Marie Dorin-Habert	(Czech Republic) Ondřej Moravec / Gabriela Soukalová	(Germany) Simon Schempp / Vanessa Hinz
2016	(Germany) Simon Schempp / Vanessa Hinz	(Germany) Erik Lesser / Franziska Hildebrand	(Russia) Alexey Volkov / Olga Podchufarova
2017	(Russia) Alexey Volkov / Ekaterina Yurlova-Percht	(Czech Republic) Ondřej Moravec / Eva Puskarčíková	(Austria) Julian Eberhard / Lisa Theresa Hauser
2018	(Italy) Lukas Hofer / Dorothea Wierer	(Germany) Simon Schempp / Franziska Preuß	(Norway) Ole Einar Bjørndalen / (Belarus) Darya Domracheva
2019	(Norway) Vetle Sjåstad Christiansen / Marte Olsbu Røiseland	(Ukraine) Dmytro Pidruchnyi / Anastasiya Merkushyna	(France) Antonin Guigonnat / Anaïs Bescond
2020	(Russia) Matvey Eliseev / Evgeniya Pavlova	(Germany) Simon Schempp / Franziska Preuß	(Germany) Benedikt Doll / Denise Herrmann
2021	(Austria) Felix Leitner / Lisa Theresa Hauser	(Russia) Matvey Eliseev / Evgeniya Burtasova	(Czech Republic) Michal Krčmář / Markéta Davidová
2022	(France) Fabien Claude / Julia Simon	(Norway) Vetle Sjåstad Christiansen / Ingrid Landmark Tandrevold	(Austria) Felix Leitner / Lisa Theresa Hauser
2023	(France) Fabien Claude / Julia Simon	(Norway) Sturla Holm Lægreid / Ingrid Landmark Tandrevold	(Slovenia) Jakov Fak / Polona Klemenčič
2024	(Norway) Sturla Holm Lægreid / Karoline Offigstad Knotten	(Germany) Justus Strelow / Anna Weidel	(Germany) Philipp Nawrath / Franziska Preuß
2025	(Germany) Justus Strelow / Janina Hettich-Walz	(France) Fabien Claude / Lou Jeanmonnot	(Norway) Mats Øverby / Juni Arnekleiv

- ^a The 2010 event was rescheduled for March 2011 because of the roof destruction.

=== Successful nations ===
Rank	Country	Victories
1	Norway	6
2	Russia	5
3	Germany	4.5
4	France	3
5	Ukraine	2
6	Austria	1.5
7	Italy	1
8	Finland; Sweden	0.5

=== Participating nations ===
Country	02	03	04	05	06	07	08	09	10	11	12	13	14	15	16	17	18	19	20	21	22	23	24	25
Austria							*	**	1*	1		1	1	1	1	1	1	1	1	1	1	1		1
Belarus	1		1					*									*		1					
Belgium																*						1	1	1
Canada															1	1				1				
China				1		1																		
Czech Republic		1		1								1	1	1	1	1	1	1	1	1	1	1	1	1
Finland	1	1							*	*	*									1	1			1
France	1	2	1	1	2	2	1	1		1	1		1	1	1	1	1	1			1	1	1	1
Germany	4	5	4	5	6	5	3*	1**	3	2	3	2	2	2	2	2	2	2	2	2	2	2	2	2
Italy	1				1	1				1		1	1	1	1	1	1	1	1	1	1			
Japan																1	1							
Latvia																							1	
Norway	2	2	2	2	2	2	2	1	2		1	2	1		1		*	1			1	1	1	1
Poland			1					1																
Romania								*																
Russia	2	1	1	1	1	1	1	1	1	1	1	1	1	1	1	1	1	1	1	1				
Slovakia			1																					
Slovenia			1								1	1		1								1	1	1
Sweden										1*	*			1					1				1	
Switzerland										1			1					1	1	1	1	1		1
Ukraine				1			1	1	1	1	1	1	1	1	1	*	1	1	1	1	1	1	1	
United States							1	1	1		1													

Legend to the table

«*» – one athlete in a mixed pair.
