= Biathlon World Championships 2019 – Men's individual =

Men's individual at the Biathlon World Championships 2019
- Venue: Östersund Ski Stadium
- Location: Östersund, Sweden
- Dates: 13 March
- Competitors: 102 from 33 nations
- Winning time: 52:42.4

Medalists
| gold medal | Arnd Peiffer | Germany |
| silver medal | Vladimir Iliev | Bulgaria |
| bronze medal | Tarjei Bø | Norway |

The men's individual competition at the Biathlon World Championships 2019 was held on 13 March 2019.

== Results ==
The race was started at 16:10.

| Rank | Bib | Name | Nationality | Time | Penalties (P+S+P+S) | Deficit |
|---|---|---|---|---|---|---|
| 1st place, gold medalist(s) | 24 | Arnd Peiffer | Germany | 52:42.4 | 0 (0+0+0+0) | |
| 2nd place, silver medalist(s) | 42 | Vladimir Iliev | Bulgaria | 53:51.1 | 1 (0+1+0+0) | +1:08.7 |
| 3rd place, bronze medalist(s) | 83 | Tarjei Bø | Norway | 53:51.5 | 1 (0+1+0+0) | +1:09.1 |
| 4 | 19 | Sebastian Samuelsson | Sweden | 54:18.1 | 1 (0+0+1+0) | +1:35.7 |
| 5 | 29 | Lukas Hofer | Italy | 54:35.6 | 2 (0+1+1+0) | +1:53.2 |
| 6 | 26 | Simon Desthieux | France | 54:36.4 | 3 (0+2+0+1) | +1:54.0 |
| 7 | 48 | Evgeniy Garanichev | Russia | 54:38.9 | 1 (0+0+1+0) | +1:56.5 |
| 8 | 75 | Vetle Sjåstad Christiansen | Norway | 54:41.6 | 0 (0+0+0+0) | +1:59.2 |
| 9 | 53 | Johannes Thingnes Bø | Norway | 54:43.2 | 3 (0+2+1+0) | +2:00.8 |
| 10 | 35 | Benedikt Doll | Germany | 54:45.9 | 3 (0+1+1+1) | +2:03.5 |
| 11 | 55 | Erik Lesser | Germany | 54:49.0 | 2 (0+1+0+1) | +2:06.6 |
| 12 | 59 | Quentin Fillon Maillet | France | 54:57.2 | 2 (1+1+0+0) | +2:14.8 |
| 13 | 61 | Andrejs Rastorgujevs | Latvia | 55:08.0 | 2 (0+0+0+2) | +2:25.6 |
| 14 | 33 | Alexander Loginov | Russia | 55:30.7 | 3 (1+1+0+1) | +2:48.3 |
| 15 | 34 | Vladimir Chepelin | Belarus | 55:38.1 | 2 (0+1+0+1) | +2:55.7 |
| 16 | 71 | Leif Nordgren | United States | 55:58.1 | 1 (0+0+0+1) | +3:15.7 |
| 17 | 41 | Sean Doherty | United States | 56:00.9 | 2 (0+1+0+1) | +3:18.5 |
| 18 | 36 | Lars Helge Birkeland | Norway | 56:02.9 | 1 (0+0+1+0) | +3:20.5 |
| 19 | 60 | Simon Fourcade | France | 56:18.7 | 2 (0+1+0+1) | +3:36.3 |
| 20 | 72 | Roman Rees | Germany | 56:24.5 | 2 (1+0+1+0) | +3:42.1 |
| 21 | 2 | Dimitar Gerdzhikov | Bulgaria | 56:24.7 | 1 (0+1+0+0) | +3:42.3 |
| 22 | 54 | Tomáš Krupčík | Czech Republic | 56:29.7 | 2 (1+0+1+0) | +3:47.3 |
| 23 | 90 | Michal Krčmář | Czech Republic | 56:33.3 | 2 (1+1+0+0) | +3:50.9 |
| 24 | 22 | Jeremy Finello | Switzerland | 56:42.9 | 3 (0+1+1+1) | +4:00.5 |
| 25 | 67 | Roland Lessing | Estonia | 56:53.5 | 1 (1+0+0+0) | +4:11.1 |
| 26 | 49 | Scott Gow | Canada | 56:55.5 | 3 (1+0+0+2) | +4:13.1 |
| 27 | 70 | Krasimir Anev | Bulgaria | 56:55.7 | 2 (1+1+0+0) | +4:13.3 |
| 28 | 65 | Jesper Nelin | Sweden | 56:56.5 | 3 (0+1+0+2) | +4:14.1 |
| 29 | 56 | Dominik Windisch | Italy | 57:13.4 | 4 (2+1+1+0) | +4:31.0 |
| 30 | 27 | Felix Leitner | Austria | 57:20.0 | 3 (1+1+0+1) | +4:37.6 |
| 31 | 23 | Tero Seppälä | Finland | 57:34.1 | 3 (2+0+0+1) | +4:51.7 |
| 32 | 21 | Florent Claude | Belgium | 57:38.6 | 2 (0+0+0+2) | +4:56.2 |
| 33 | 63 | Raman Yaliotnau | Belarus | 57:41.7 | 4 (2+0+1+1) | +4:59.3 |
| 34 | 44 | Timofey Lapshin | South Korea | 57:48.6 | 2 (0+1+0+1) | +5:06.2 |
| 35 | 95 | Michal Šlesingr | Czech Republic | 57:55.3 | 2 (0+1+0+1) | +5:12.9 |
| 36 | 1 | Nikita Porshnev | Russia | 57:55.5 | 4 (1+1+1+1) | +5:13.1 |
| 37 | 4 | Ondřej Moravec | Czech Republic | 58:12.8 | 4 (0+2+1+1) | +5:30.4 |
| 38 | 50 | Kalev Ermits | Estonia | 58:24.5 | 3 (0+1+1+1) | +5:42.1 |
| 39 | 43 | Martin Fourcade | France | 58:28.4 | 4 (1+1+0+2) | +5:46.0 |
| 40 | 68 | Matej Kazár | Slovakia | 58:54.9 | 3 (0+1+0+2) | +6:12.5 |
| 41 | 37 | Julian Eberhard | Austria | 58:58.7 | 5 (3+0+1+1) | +6:16.3 |
| 42 | 38 | Jakov Fak | Slovenia | 59:02.1 | 4 (0+1+1+2) | +6:19.7 |
| 43 | 76 | Thomas Bormolini | Italy | 59:11.3 | 3 (2+0+0+1) | +6:28.9 |
| 44 | 47 | Benjamin Weger | Switzerland | 59:13.1 | 6 (2+2+2+0) | +6:30.7 |
| 45 | 78 | Alexander Povarnitsyn | Russia | 59:14.0 | 4 (0+2+1+1) | +6:31.6 |
| 46 | 9 | Klemen Bauer | Slovenia | 59:16.6 | 5 (1+2+0+2) | +6:34.2 |
| 47 | 101 | Martin Ponsiluoma | Sweden | 59:22.9 | 4 (0+1+3+0) | +6:40.5 |
| 48 | 85 | Dominik Landertinger | Austria | 59:23.9 | 4 (0+1+1+2) | +6:41.5 |
| 49 | 16 | Sergey Bocharnikov | Belarus | 59:31.4 | 4 (1+1+1+1) | +6:49.0 |
| 50 | 73 | Łukasz Szczurek | Poland | 59:42.5 | 3 (1+1+0+1) | +7:00.1 |
| 51 | 31 | Karol Dombrovski | Lithuania | 59:50.2 | 3 (0+1+1+1) | +7:07.8 |
| 52 | 57 | Tsukasa Kobonoki | Japan | 1:00:09.1 | 4 (0+0+1+3) | +7:26.7 |
| 53 | 40 | Cornel Puchianu | Romania | 1:00:13.6 | 4 (0+1+1+2) | +7:31.2 |
| 54 | 3 | Roman Yeremin | Kazakhstan | 1:00:16.3 | 6 (3+0+2+1) | +7:33.9 |
| 55 | 97 | Rok Tršan | Slovenia | 1:00:16.8 | 2 (1+0+0+1) | +7:34.4 |
| 56 | 39 | Martin Otčenáš | Slovakia | 1:00:26.0 | 5 (1+2+1+1) | +7:43.6 |
| 57 | 91 | Andrzej Nędza-Kubiniec | Poland | 1:00:26.1 | 3 (1+1+1+0) | +7:43.7 |
| 58 | 103 | Anton Smolski | Belarus | 1:00:34.2 | 5 (2+1+2+0) | +7:51.8 |
| 59 | 96 | Vitaliy Trush | Ukraine | 1:00:42.0 | 2 (0+1+1+0) | +7:59.6 |
| 60 | 45 | Aleksandrs Patrijuks | Latvia | 1:00:49.1 | 4 (2+2+0+0) | +8:06.7 |
| 61 | 66 | Vytautas Strolia | Lithuania | 1:00:54.4 | 5 (0+1+3+1) | +8:12.0 |
| 62 | 77 | Olli Hiidensalo | Finland | 1:01:21.1 | 4 (1+0+2+1) | +8:38.7 |
| 63 | 15 | Tomas Kaukėnas | Lithuania | 1:01:28.2 | 4 (0+4+0+0) | +8:45.8 |
| 64 | 86 | Erlend Bjøntegaard | Norway | 1:01:30.2 | 7 (1+3+1+2) | +8:47.8 |
| 65 | 80 | Ruslan Tkalenko | Ukraine | 1:01:30.8 | 6 (0+3+0+3) | +8:48.4 |
| 66 | 84 | Kosuke Ozaki | Japan | 1:01:33.7 | 4 (2+0+1+1) | +8:51.3 |
| 67 | 7 | Peppe Femling | Sweden | 1:01:58.0 | 6 (0+1+4+1) | +9:15.6 |
| 68 | 6 | Jake Brown | United States | 1:02:00.8 | 7 (1+0+2+4) | +9:18.4 |
| 69 | 51 | Serhiy Semenov | Ukraine | 1:02:04.5 | 6 (2+1+0+3) | +9:22.1 |
| 70 | 52 | Grzegorz Guzik | Poland | 1:02:07.5 | 6 (1+2+2+1) | +9:25.1 |
| 71 | 69 | Miha Dovžan | Slovenia | 1:02:34.2 | 4 (1+3+0+0) | +9:51.8 |
| 72 | 5 | Thierry Chenal | Italy | 1:02:35.2 | 4 (0+1+2+1) | +9:52.8 |
| 73 | 62 | Martin Jäger | Switzerland | 1:02:36.7 | 7 (2+2+0+3) | +9:54.3 |
| 74 | 20 | Yan Xingyuan | China | 1:02:40.1 | 5 (1+1+0+3) | +9:57.7 |
| 75 | 94 | Denis Șerban | Romania | 1:02:45.2 | 3 (1+0+1+1) | +10:02.8 |
| 76 | 25 | Mihail Usov | Moldova | 1:02:48.3 | 6 (0+4+0+2) | +10:05.9 |
| 77 | 58 | Timur Kuts | Kazakhstan | 1:03:09.2 | 4 (0+2+1+1) | +10:26.8 |
| 78 | 102 | Tuomas Grönman | Finland | 1:03:19.3 | 5 (2+1+1+1) | +10:36.9 |
| 79 | 17 | Choi Du-jin | South Korea | 1:03:31.8 | 3 (1+1+1+0) | +10:49.4 |
| 80 | 82 | Wang Wenqiang | China | 1:03:33.0 | 5 (1+1+0+3) | +10:50.6 |
| 81 | 74 | George Buta | Romania | 1:04:01.9 | 5 (3+1+1+0) | +11:19.5 |
| 82 | 8 | Kauri Kõiv | Estonia | 1:04:05.5 | 7 (4+1+2+0) | +11:23.1 |
| 83 | 18 | Artem Tyshchenko | Ukraine | 1:04:09.2 | 7 (1+2+1+3) | +11:26.8 |
| 84 | 99 | Alex Howe | United States | 1:04:26.8 | 6 (1+3+1+1) | +11:44.4 |
| 85 | 32 | Apostolos Angelis | Greece | 1:04:34.3 | 7 (2+3+0+2) | +11:51.9 |
| 86 | 11 | Michal Šíma | Slovakia | 1:04:38.9 | 7 (2+2+2+1) | +11:56.5 |
| 87 | 93 | Mario Dolder | Switzerland | 1:04:52.5 | 9 (4+1+3+1) | +12:10.1 |
| 88 | 64 | Thierry Langer | Belgium | 1:05:00.7 | 7 (2+2+2+1) | +12:18.3 |
| 89 | 88 | Sergey Sirik | Kazakhstan | 1:05:41.6 | 5 (1+2+1+1) | +12:59.2 |
| 90 | 98 | Kazuya Inomata | Japan | 1:05:43.1 | 6 (1+1+2+2) | +13:00.7 |
| 91 | 46 | Milanko Petrović | Serbia | 1:05:43.6 | 5 (3+0+2+0) | +13:01.2 |
| 92 | 13 | Roberts Slotiņš | Latvia | 1:06:28.4 | 7 (2+3+0+2) | +13:46.0 |
| 93 | 100 | Aidan Millar | Canada | 1:08:04.8 | 7 (3+0+1+3) | +15:22.4 |
| 94 | 14 | Dávid Panyik | Hungary | 1:08:19.4 | 6 (1+0+1+4) | +15:37.0 |
| 95 | 87 | Damir Rastić | Serbia | 1:08:22.5 | 10 (2+3+2+3) | +15:40.1 |
| 96 | 79 | Lee Su-young | South Korea | 1:08:35.1 | 5 (1+2+1+1) | +15:52.7 |
| 97 | 30 | Roberto Piqueras | Spain | 1:12:34.9 | 10 (4+1+4+1) | +19:52.5 |
| 98 | 28 | Soma Gyallai | Hungary | 1:18:00.6 | 12 (2+4+5+1) | +25:18.2 |
| | 12 | Stavre Jada | North Macedonia | DNF | 11 (4+2+1+4) | |
| | 81 | Christian Gow | Canada | DNF | (0+0+ + ) | |
| | 89 | Simon Eder | Austria | DNF | (1+2+0+ ) | |
| | 92 | Anton Sinapov | Bulgaria | DNF | (2+2+2+ ) | |
| | 10 | Jules Burnotte | Canada | Did not start | | |
