= Brazil at the 2017 Winter Universiade =

- IOC code: BRA
- NOC: Brazilian University Sports Confederation
- Website: www.cbdu.org.br

in Almaty
- Competitors: 1 in 1 sport
- Medals: Gold 0 Silver 0 Bronze 0 Total 0

Winter Universiade appearances (overview)
- 1960; 1962; 1964; 1966; 1968; 1972; 1978; 1981; 1983; 1985; 1987; 1989; 1991; 1993; 1995; 1997; 1999; 2001; 2003; 2005; 2007; 2009; 2011; 2013; 2015; 2017; 2019; 2023; 2025

Brazil competed at the 2017 Winter Universiade in Almaty, Kazakhstan. Brazil sent only one athlete, Bruna Moura in cross-country skiing.

== Cross-country skiing ==
Athlete	Event	Qualification	Rank	Quarterfinal	Rank	Semifinal	Rank	Final	Rank
Bruna Moura	5 km classic	—						18:52.1	56
Bruna Moura	5 km pursuit free	—						21:01.1	52
Bruna Moura	sprint free	4:09.66	43	did not advance					
Bruna Moura	15 km free mass start	—						54:37.9	34
