= Daisuke Murakami (figure skater) =

Japanese figure skater (born 1991)

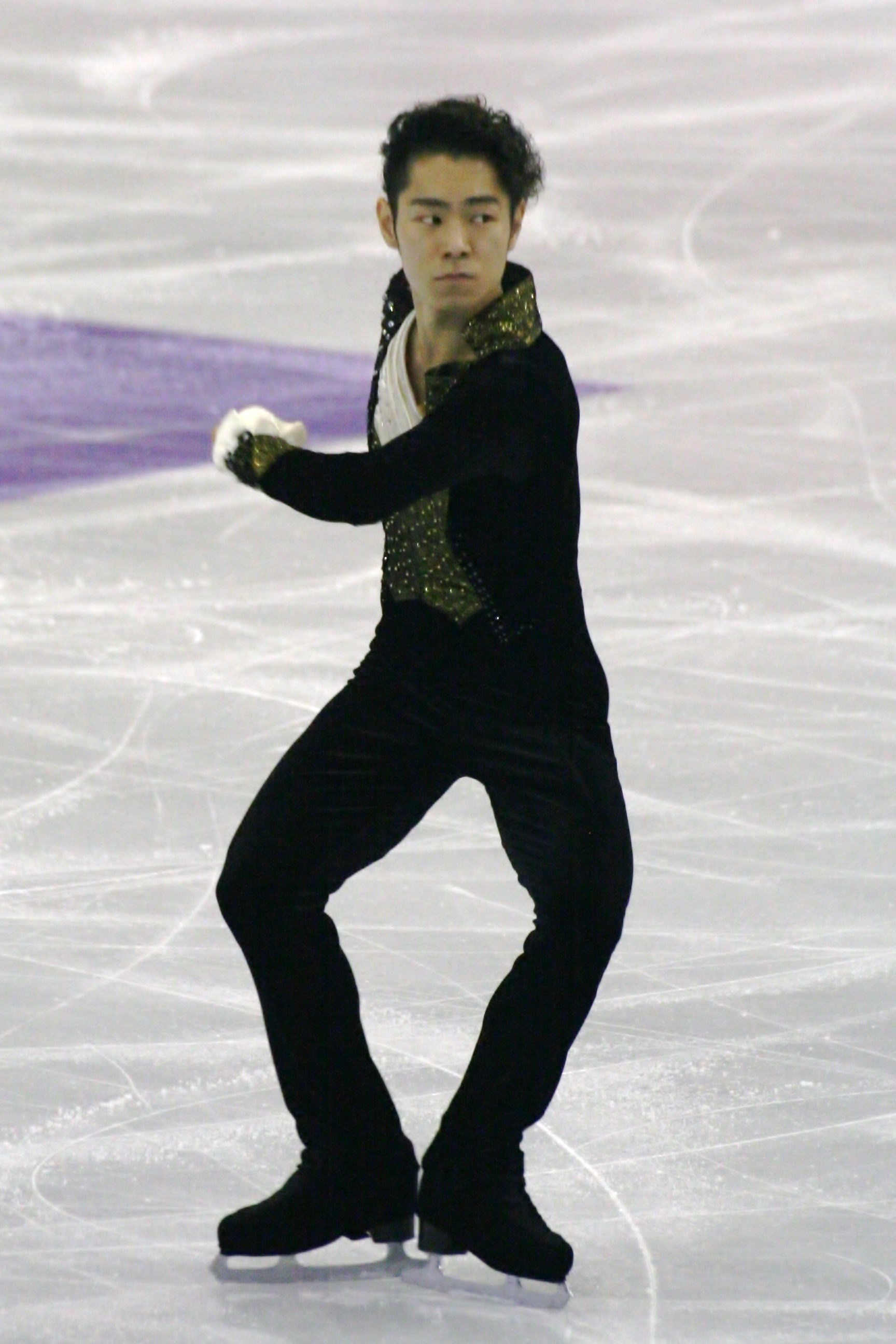
- Daisuke Murakami at 2015 Grand Prix of Figure Skating Final

Personal information
- Born: January 15, 1991 (age 35) Kanagawa, Japan
- Height: 165 cm (5 ft 5 in)

Figure skating career
- Country: Japan
- Coach: Frank Carroll; Kumiko Sato
- Skating club: Aomori FSC
- Began skating: 2001
- Retired: June 14, 2018

Daisuke Murakami

Japanese name
- Kanji: 村上 大介
- Kana: むらかみ だいすけ
Transcriptions
- Romanization: Murakami Daisuke

Daisuke "Dice" Murakami (村上 大介, Murakami Daisuke; born January 15, 1991, in Kanagawa) is a Japanese figure skater.

He is the 2014 NHK Trophy champion, 2011 Ondrej Nepela Memorial champion, and 2009 Japan Junior bronze medalist.

Earlier in his career, he represented the United States, winning a bronze medal on the ISU Junior Grand Prix series and the 2006 U.S. junior national pewter medal.

In 2011, Murakami became the first to land the quad salchow jump in the men's category at the Japan Championships.

Murakami has appeared in variety of TV shows in Japan collaborating with Yoshiki Hayashi from X Japan and Kenta Maeda from Los Angeles Dodgers.

== Personal life ==
Daisuke "Dice" Murakami was born on January 15, 1991, in Kanagawa, Japan.

His family moved to the United States in 2000 after winning a green-card lottery to become US residents.

== Career ==
=== For the United States ===
Murakami began skating at age ten, soon after moving to the U.S. He began competing on the juvenile level in 2001.

Representing the U.S., Murakami made his international debut in April 2004 at the Triglav Trophy, where he won the novice men's title. He received his first ISU Junior Grand Prix (JGP) assignments in autumn 2004. In the 2006–07 season, he won the bronze medal at his JGP event in Mexico.

=== For Japan ===
Murakami made no international appearances during the 2007–08 season due to his switch to Japan. He was released at the start of the following season but could not compete at his first JGP assignment, in Mexico, due to a paperwork problem. He placed fourth at his next JGP event, in South Africa.

Making his senior international debut, Murakami placed 7th at the 2009 Finlandia Trophy and 9th at his first Grand Prix event, the 2009 NHK Trophy. In 2010, he parted ways with his coach, Nikolai Morozov, and relocated to Los Angeles, California to work with Frank Carroll. He won the bronze medal at the 2011 Winter Universiade in Turkey.

The following season, Murakami won gold at the 2011 Ondrej Nepela Memorial and 2011 Merano Cup. He finished sixth at the 2011 Skate America and 2011–12 Japanese Nationals.

Murakami began the 2012–13 season by winning the silver medal at 2012 Ondrej Nepela Memorial. He dislocated his right shoulder during competition at the 2012 NHK Trophy, forcing him to withdraw from the event. He also withdrew from the 2012–13 Japanese Nationals due to his recovery, but came back to finish the season with a bronze medal at the 2012 Triglav Trophy.

In the 2013–14 season, Murakami won both the Tokyo Regionals and the Eastern Sectionals. He then won the silver medal at 2013 Merano Cup. He came in tenth at the 2013–14 Japanese Nationals and finished the season with a gold medal at the Coupe du Printemps in Luxembourg.

On August 12, 2014, it was announced that Murakami had been selected as a host pick at the 2014 NHK Trophy. In September, he placed third in the 2014 U.S. International Classic at Salt Lake City, Utah. In November, he won the men's single event at the NHK Trophy, beating three skaters who qualified for the Grand Prix Final. At the 2015 Four Continents Championships in Seoul, Korea, he set personal best scores in all segments; he placed third in the free skate and fourth overall.

In the 2014–15 season, Murakami won the bronze medal at Grand Prix Skate Canada. He then was awarded the bronze medal at the 2015 Trophee Eric Bompard after placing third in the short program. The second day of competition was cancelled due to the November 2015 Paris attacks. Murakami qualified for the Grand Prix Final where he finished 6th. He was named as an alternate for the Japanese Olympic team

== Programs ==
Season	Short program	Free skating	Exhibition
2017–2018	Bring Him Home (from Les Misérables) by Claude-Michel Schönberg performed by Josh Groban choreo. by Lori Nichol	Pagliacci by Ruggero Leoncavallo performed by Andrea Bocelli choreo. by Lori Nichol	
2016–2017	Bring Him Home (from Les Misérables) by Claude-Michel Schönberg performed by Josh Groban choreo. by Lori Nichol	Pagliacci by Ruggero Leoncavallo performed by Andrea Bocelli choreo. by Lori Nichol	
2015–2016	Bring Him Home (from Les Misérables) by Claude-Michel Schönberg performed by Josh Groban choreo. by Lori Nichol	Anniversary by Yoshiki choreo. by Lori Nichol	The Prayer by David Foster, Carole Bayer Sager, Alberto Testa, Tony Renis performed by David Archuleta, Nathan Pacheco; El Tango de Roxanne (from Moulin Rouge soundtrack)
2014–2015	El Tango de Roxanne (from Moulin Rouge soundtrack); The Wind and the Lion by Jerry Goldsmith	Piano Concerto No. 2 by Sergei Rachmaninoff	Say Something by A Great Big World
2013–2014	Once Upon a Time in Mexico by Robert Rodriguez	Gladiator by Hans Zimmer	
2012–2013	Bolero for Violin and Orchestra by Walter Taieb	The Mission by Ennio Morricone	Die in Your Arms
2011–2012	The Feeling Begins by Peter Gabriel	Gladiator by Hans Zimmer	
2010–2011	Toccata and Fugue by Johann Sebastian Bach performed by Vanessa-Mae	Lawrence of Arabia by Maurice Jarre	SexyBack by Justin Timberlake; Move, Shake, and Drop by DJ Laz
2009–2010	West Side Story by Leonard Bernstein	The Rock by Nick Glennie-Smith, Hans Zimmer, and Harry Gregson-Williams	Señorita by Justin Timberlake; Low by Flo Rida
2008–2009	Night on Bald Mountain by Modest Mussorgsky choreo. by Nikolai Morozov	Rhapsody on a Theme of Paganini by Sergei Rachmaninoff choreo. by Nikolai Morozov	Apologize by OneRepublic
2007–2008			Pump It by Black Eyed Peas
2006–2007	Breakfast at Tiffany's by Henry Mancini	The Vision of Escaflowne by Yoko Kanno	
2005–2006	Korobushka by Bond	West Side Story by Leonard Bernstein	Pump It by Black Eyed Peas
2004–2005	Hava Nagila by various artists	Pirates of the Caribbean by Hans Zimmer, Klaus Badelt	
2003–2004	Sing Sing Sing by Louis Prima	Fiddler on the Roof by Jerry Bock, Sheldon Harnick, John Williams	
2002–2003		Iron Monkey by Richard Yuen, James L. Venable	

== Competitive highlights ==
GP: Grand Prix; CS: Challenger Series; JGP: Junior Grand Prix

=== Results for Japan ===
International
Event	07–08	08–09	09–10	10–11	11–12	12–13	13–14	14–15	15–16	16–17	17–18
Four Continents								4th			
GP Final									6th		
GP France									3rd	WD	
GP NHK Trophy			9th			WD		1st			
GP Skate America				5th	6th					WD	
GP Skate Canada									3rd		
CS Autumn Classic											8th
CS Ondrej Nepela										4th	
CS U.S. Classic								3rd			
Finlandia Trophy			7th	5th							
Merano Cup					1st		2nd				
Printemps							1st	1st			
Nepela Memorial					1st	2nd					
Triglav Trophy				2nd		3rd					
Universiade				3rd							
International: Junior
JGP South Africa		4th									
Challenge Cup		1st J									
National
Japan Champ.		5th	19th	7th	6th		10th	7th	7th		5th
Japan Junior	5th	3rd									
Team events
Japan Open									1st T 5th P		

=== Results for the United States ===
International: Junior or novice
Event	04–05	05–06	06–07
World Junior Champ.		11th	
JGP China	11th		
JGP Chinese Taipei			4th
JGP Mexico			3rd
National
U.S. Championships		4th J	15th
