= Biathlon at the 2011 Winter Universiade =

Biathlon at the 2011 Winter Universiade were held in Dumlu District in Erzurum, Turkey. The nine events were scheduled for January 29 - February 5, 2011.

== Men's events ==
Event	Gold		Silver		Bronze	
Individual	Alexey Trusov; Russia	57:34.2 (1+0+0+0)	Krasimir Anev; Bulgaria	57:43.1 (0+0+0+1)	Matej Kazar; Slovakia	57:44.6 (0+0+0+1)
Sprint	Artem Pryma; Ukraine	28:25.3 (0+0)	Sergii Semenov; Ukraine	28:31.7 (0+0)	Evgeniy Garanichev; Russia	28:38.9 (1+0)
Pursuit	Sergii Semenov; Ukraine	36:08.6 (1+0+1+1)	Artem Pryma; Ukraine	35:21.7 (0+3+0+0)	Evgeniy Garanichev; Russia	36:31.5 (1+1+2+0)
Mass start	Artem Pryma; Ukraine	41:22.2 (0+1+0+0)	Krasimir Anev; Bulgaria	41:31.2 (0+0+1+1)	Alexey Trusov; Russia	41:31.4 (1+1+1+0)

== Women's events ==
Event	Gold		Silver		Bronze	
Individual	Daria Virolaynen; Russia	48:13.6 (0+0+0+1)	Franziska Hildebrand; Germany	48:56.9 (0+0+0+0)	Darya Yurkevich; Belarus	49:09.9 (0+1+0+0)
Sprint	Vita Semerenko; Ukraine	23:39.5 (1+0)	Evgeniya Sedova; Russia	24:18.7 (1+1)	Emilia Yordanova; Bulgaria	24:27.4 (0+0)
Pursuit	Vita Semerenko; Ukraine	32:16.3 (0+2+1+1)	Daria Virolaynen; Russia	32:33.0 (0+0+0+0)	Evgeniya Sedova; Russia	32:40.1 (0+1+0+2)
Mass start	Maria Sadilova; Russia	42:00.7 (0+0+1+0)	Anna Kunaeva; Russia	42:47.3 (0+3+0+1)	Stefanie Hildebrand; Germany	43:10.5 (0+0+2+0)

== Mixed Event ==
Event	Gold		Silver		Bronze	
Mixed relay	Ukraine (UKR); Svitlana Krykonchuk; Vita Semerenko; Artem Pryma; Sergii Semenov	1:24:58.6; 0+0; 0+2; 0+3; 0+2	Russia (RUS); Anastasiya Romanova; Evgeniya Sedova; Alexey Trusov; Evgeniy Garanichev	1:27:27.2; 0+2; 0+5; 4+4; 0+3	Bulgaria (BUL); Emilia Yordanova; Silviya Georgieva; Vladimir Iliev; Krasimir Anev	1:28:46.4; 0+3; 0+3; 0+0; 0+1

== Medal table ==
Rank	Nation	Gold	Silver	Bronze	Total
1	Ukraine	6	2	0	8
2	Russia	3	4	4	11
3	Bulgaria	0	2	2	4
4	Germany	0	1	1	2
5	Belarus	0	0	1	1
5	Slovakia	0	0	1	1
Totals (6 entries)		9	9	9	27
