= 2018 World Team Challenge =

The 17th World Team Challenge 2018 (officially: Joka Classic Biathlon World Team Challenge auf Schalke 2018) was a biathlon competition, that was held at December 29, 2018, at the Veltins-Arena in Gelsenkirchen, Germany. The event was visited by 46.412 fans.

== Format of competition ==
The competition was held in two stages: mass start and pursuit.

== Participants ==
20 sportsmen (10 male, 10 female) competed as mixed teams. 10 different countries were represented at this event. Ole Einar Bjørndalen from Norway and Darya Domracheva from Belarus, who were at the moment retired athletes, took part in this competition as a pair.

== Results ==
=== Mass start ===
Results and video are available here.

Rank	Name	Country	Time
1	Dorothea Wierer / Lukas Hofer	Italy	33:24,8
2	Anaïs Bescond / Émilien Jacquelin	France	+3,4
3	Darya Domracheva / Ole Einar Bjørndalen	Belarus / Norway	+6,1
4	Lisa Hauser / Dominik Landertinger	Austria	+8,2
5	Franziska Preuß / Simon Schempp	Germany	+21,0
6	Denise Herrmann / Benedikt Doll	Germany	+52,1
7	Artem Pryma / Yuliia Dzhima	Ukraine	+1:02,8
8	Veronika Vítková / Michal Krčmář	Czech Republic	+1:10,6
9	Ekaterina Yurlova-Percht / Anton Shipulin	Russia	+1:14,7
10	Fuyuko Tachizaki / Mikito Tachizaki	Japan	+1:16,2

=== Pursuit ===
Results, video and photos are available here.

Rank	Name	Country	Time
1	Dorothea Wierer / Lukas Hofer	Italy	33:23,6
2	Franziska Preuß / Simon Schempp	Germany	+1,2
3	Darya Domracheva / Ole Einar Bjørndalen	Belarus / Norway	+24,2
4	Denise Herrmann / Benedikt Doll	Germany	+24,3
5	Lisa Hauser / Dominik Landertinger	Austria	+1:04,1
6	Veronika Vítková / Michal Krčmář	Czech Republic	+1:09,5
7	Ekaterina Yurlova-Percht / Anton Shipulin	Russia	+1:48,8
8	Yuliia Dzhima / Artem Pryma	Ukraine	+2:12,3
9	Anaïs Bescond / Émilien Jacquelin	France	+3:11,3
10	Fuyuko Tachizaki / Mikito Tachizaki	Japan	+4:58,0
