= 2019 World Team Challenge =

The 18th World Team Challenge 2019 (officially: Joka Classic Biathlon World Team Challenge auf Schalke 2019) was a biathlon competition, that was held at December 28, 2019, at the Veltins-Arena in Gelsenkirchen, Germany.

== Format of competition ==
The competition was held in two stages: mass start and pursuit.

== Participants ==
20 sportsmen (10 male, 10 female) competed as mixed teams. 9 countries were represented at this event.

== Results ==
=== Mass start ===
Results and video are available here.

Rank	Name	Country	Time
1	Dorothea Wierer / Lukas Hofer	Italy	32:16,9
2	Laura Dahlmeier / Philipp Nawrath	Germany	+4,5
3	Anastasiya Merkushyna / Dmytro Pidruchnyi	Ukraine	+12,0
4	Marte Olsbu Røiseland / Vetle Sjåstad Christiansen	Norway	+16,6
5	Anaïs Bescond / Antonin Guigonnat	France	+26,1
6	Lena Häcki / Benjamin Weger	Switzerland	+36,2
7	Lisa Hauser / Felix Leitner	Austria	+44,9
8	Markéta Davidová / Michal Krčmář	Czech Republic	48,4
9	Denise Herrmann / Benedikt Doll	Germany	+1:08,7
10	Ekaterina Yurlova-Percht / Matvey Eliseev	Russia	+1:43,9

=== Pursuit ===
Results, video and photos are available here.

Rank	Name	Country	Time
1	Marte Olsbu Røiseland / Vetle Sjåstad Christiansen	Norway	32:40,9
2	Anastasiya Merkushyna / Dmytro Pidruchnyi	Ukraine	+25,7
3	Anaïs Bescond / Antonin Guigonnat	France	+32,5
4	Laura Dahlmeier / Philipp Nawrath	Germany	+33,1
5	Dorothea Wierer / Lukas Hofer	Italy	+1:03,4
6	Lisa Hauser / Felix Leitner	Austria	+1:03,9
7	Lena Häcki / Benjamin Weger	Switzerland	+1:04,3
8	Markéta Davidová / Michal Krčmář	Czech Republic	+1:10,5
9	Denise Herrmann / Benedikt Doll	Germany	+1:48,2
10	Ekaterina Yurlova-Percht / Matvey Eliseev	Russia	+2:50,1
