= Cross-country skiing at the 2011 Winter Universiade =

Cross-country skiing at the 2011 Winter Universiade was held at the Dumlu District in Erzurum, Turkey. The eleven events were scheduled for January 28 to February 5, 2011.

== Men's events ==
Event	Gold		Silver		Bronze	
10 kilometre classical	Vladislav Skobelev; Russia	25:43.1	Akira Lenting; Japan	25:43.1	Gennadiy Matviyenko; Kazakhstan	26:41.6
15 kilometre pursuit	Vladislav Skobelev; Russia	43:58.7	Ilshat Nigmatullin; Russia	44:40.9	Alexandr Ossipov; Kazakhstan	44:47.9
30 kilometre freestyle	Vladislav Skobelev; Russia	1:17:19.5	Ilshat Nigmatullin; Russia	1:17:19.8	Andrey Kal'sin; Russia	1:17:24.0
4 x 10 kilometre relay	France (FRA); Clement Molliet; Cyril Galliard; Martin Egraz; Baptiste Gros	1:40:44.8; 25:21.4; 25:33.0; 24:56.5; 24:53.9	Russia (RUS); Dmitry Baklanov; Vladislav Skobelev; Anton Suzdalev; Ilshat Nigmatullin	1:40:46.0; 26:20.6; 24:30.0; 25:01.6; 24:53.8	Kazakhstan (KAZ); Gennadiy Matviyenko; Ivan Drobyuazko; Alexandr Ossipov; Denis Volotka	1:42:28.3; 25:27.1; 26:12.5; 25:21.4; 25:27.3
Sprint	Radik Gaziev; Russia	3:02.3	Baptiste Gros; France	3:03.2	Denis Volotka; Kazakhstan	3:03.7

== Women's events ==
Event	Gold		Silver		Bronze	
5 kilometre classical	Alia Iksanova; Russia	14:45.7	Kateryna Grygorenko; Ukraine	15:03.1	Virginia De Martin Topranin; Italy	15:12.3
10 kilometre pursuit	Alena Procházková; Slovakia	31:11.6	Alia Iksanova; Russia	31:12.2	Kateryna Grygorenko; Ukraine	31:27.3
15 kilometre freestyle	Alena Procházková; Slovakia	43:33.2	Alia Iksanova; Russia	43:34.1	Kateryna Grygorenko; Ukraine	43:42.0
3 x 5 kilometre relay	Russia (RUS); Svetlana Bochkareva; Yana Yanovskaya; Alia Iksanova	41:51.6; 13:54.1; 14:12.0; 13:45.5	Ukraine (UKR); Kateryna Grygorenko; Maryna Antsybor; Zoya Zaviedieieva	42:55.2; 13:51.4; 14:01.3; 15:02.5	France (FRA); Marion Buillet; Pauline Caprini; Anouk Faivre Picon	42:55.2; 14:52.7; 14:01.3; 14:01.2
Sprint	Alena Procházková; Slovakia	2:43.7	Eva Nývltová; Czech Republic	2:45.2	Alina Kashina; Russia	2:45.3

== Mixed Event ==
Event	Gold		Silver		Bronze	
Mixed team sprint	Slovakia (SVK) I Peter Mlynar; Alena Procházková	14:55.8	France (FRA) I Baptiste Gros; Marion Buillet	15:00.7	Ukraine (UKR) I Ivan Bilosyuk; Kateryna Grygorenko	15:08.1

== Medal table ==
Rank	Nation	Gold	Silver	Bronze	Total
1	Russia	6	5	2	13
2	Slovakia	4	0	0	4
3	France	1	2	1	4
4	Ukraine	0	2	3	5
5	Czech Republic	0	1	0	1
5	Japan	0	1	0	1
7	Kazakhstan	0	0	4	4
8	Italy	0	0	1	1
Totals (8 entries)		11	11	11	33
