= Kateryna Grygorenko =

Ukrainian cross-country skier (born 1985)

Personal information
- Full name: Kateryna Vasylivna Grygorenko
- Nationality: Ukraine
- Born: 30 October 1985 (age 40) Ostriv, Rokytne Raion, Kyiv Oblast, Ukrainian SSR, Soviet Union
- Height: 1.66 m (5 ft 5 in)

Sport
- Sport: Skiing

World Cup career
- Seasons: 7 – (2006–2009, 2011, 2013–2014)
- Indiv. starts: 28
- Indiv. podiums: 0
- Team starts: 3
- Team podiums: 0
- Overall titles: 0 – (97th in 2011)
- Discipline titles: 0
Medal record
Women's cross-country skiing
Representing Ukraine
Winter Universiade
Gold medal – first place	2013 Trentino	3 × 5 km relay
Gold medal – first place	2013 Trentino	5 km freestyle
Silver medal – second place	2011 Erzurum	3 × 5 km relay
Silver medal – second place	2011 Erzurum	5 km classical
Silver medal – second place	2013 Trentino	Skiathlon
Bronze medal – third place	2011 Erzurum	10 km pursuit
Bronze medal – third place	2011 Erzurum	15 km freestyle
Bronze medal – third place	2011 Erzurum	Mixed team

Kateryna Vasylivna Grygorenko (Ukrainian: Катерина Василівна Григоренко, born 30 October 1985) is a Ukrainian cross-country skier who competed between 2004 and 2015.

== Career ==
Competing in two Winter Olympics, she earned her best finish of eighth in the 4 x 5 km relay at Turin in 2006 and earned her best individual finish of 27th in the 30 km event at Vancouver four years later.

Grygorenko's best finish at the FIS Nordic World Ski Championships was 38th in the 30 km event at Sapporo in 2007.

Her best World Cup finish was 40th at a 10 km event in Estonia in 2009.

Grygorenko has one child, a son.

== Cross-country skiing results ==
All results are sourced from the International Ski Federation (FIS).

=== Olympic Games ===
Year	Age	10 km individual	15 km skiathlon	30 km mass start	Sprint	4 × 5 km relay	Team sprint
2006	20	44	40	42	—	8	—
2010	24	45	—	26	—	13	14
2014	28	47	48	36	—	11	—

=== World Championships ===
Year	Age	10 km individual	15 km skiathlon	30 km mass start	Sprint	4 × 5 km relay	Team sprint
2007	21	—	48	38	—	—	—
2009	23	—	—	44	61	—	—
2011	25	35	33	—	51	12	—
2013	27	53	43	30	69	10	—
2015	29	38	44	42	—	11	—

=== World Cup ===
==== Season standings ====
Season	Age	Discipline standings			Ski Tour standings		
Season	Age	Overall	Distance	Sprint	Nordic Opening	Tour de Ski	World Cup Final
2006	20	NC	NC	—	—N/a	—N/a	—N/a
2007	21	NC	NC	—	—N/a	—	—N/a
2008	22	NC	NC	—	—N/a	—	—
2009	23	NC	NC	NC	—N/a	—	—
2011	25	97	76	NC	42	29	—
2013	27	NC	NC	NC	66	—	—
2014	28	NC	NC	NC	71	—	—
