= 2008 World Team Challenge =

International biathlon competition

The 7th World Team Challenge 2008 (officially: VELTINS-Biathlon-WTC 08) was a commercial biathlon competition, that was held at the 27th of December, 2008, at the Veltins-Arena in Gelsenkirchen, Germany. The winners were Andriy Deryzemlya and Oksana Khvostenko from Ukraine.

== Participants ==
20 sportsmen (10 male, 10 female) participated as mixed teams. Host country was represented by 3 teams. Beside that, one German athlete competed in a mixed pair with a partner from Austria. There were representatives from 7 countries, including one outside Europe.

== Results ==
Rank	Name	Country	Time (min)
1	Andriy Deryzemlya / Oksana Khvostenko	Ukraine	32:21,6
2	Christoph Sumann / Martina Beck	Austria / Germany	+0:14,6
3	Dmitri Yaroshenko / Ekaterina Iourieva	Russia	+0:32,8
4	Michael Rösch / Kati Wilhelm	Germany	+0:57,0
5	Rune Brattsveen / Tora Berger	Norway	+1:44,0
6	Alexander Wolf / Andrea Henkel	Germany	+1:58,8
7	Michael Greis / Kathrin Hitzer	Germany	+2:10,9
8	Vincent Defrasne / Sylvie Becaert	France	+2:40,2
9	Jay Hakkinen / Lanny Barnes	United States	LAP
10	Emil Hegle Svendsen / Solveig Rogstad	Norway	LAP
