= Vladimir Iliev =

Bulgarian biathlete (born 1987)

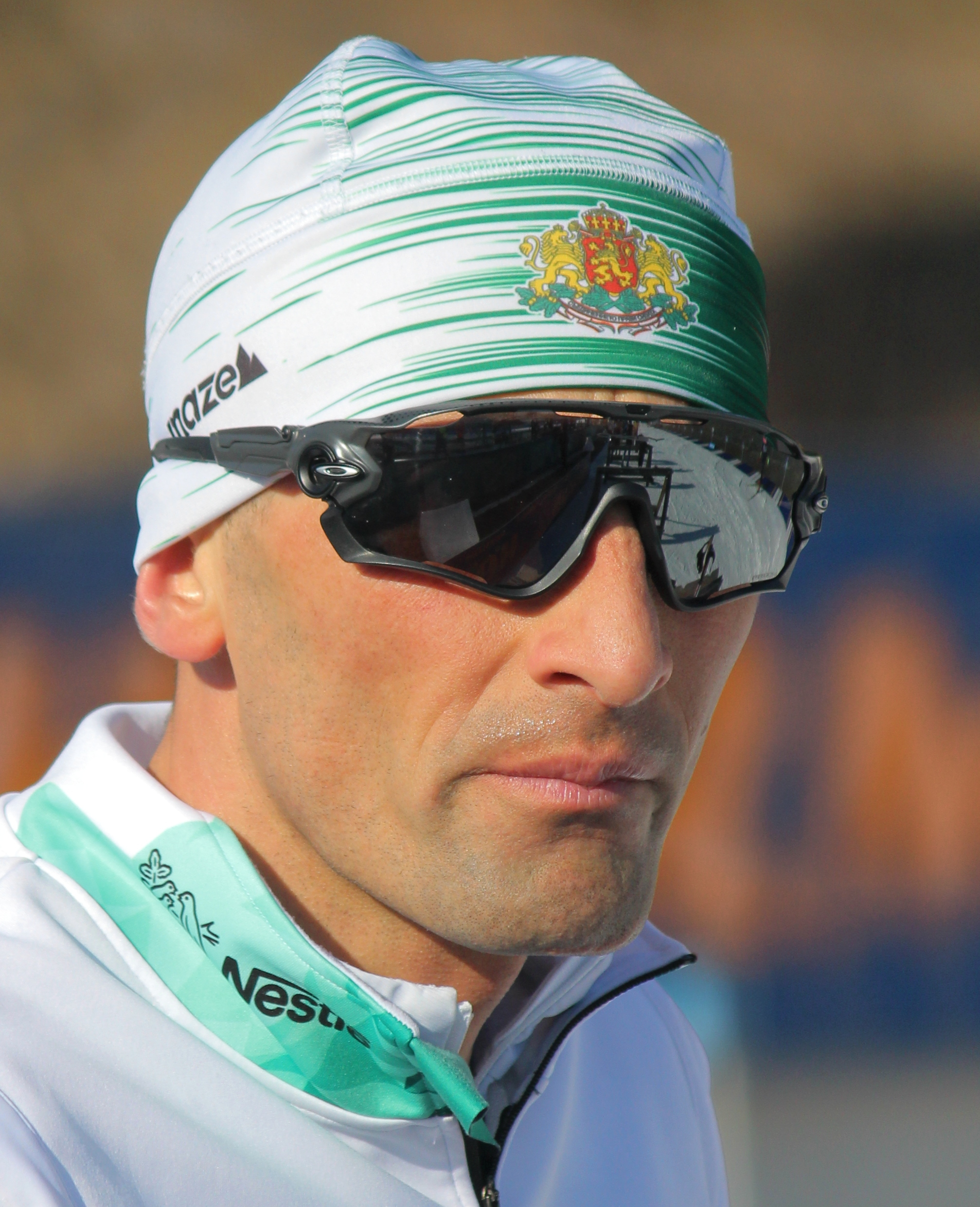
- Iliev in 2017

Personal information
- Nationality: Bulgarian
- Born: 17 March 1987 (age 39) Troyan, PR Bulgaria
- Height: 1.82 m (6 ft 0 in)
- Weight: 72 kg (159 lb)

Sport

Professional information
- Sport: Biathlon
- World Cup debut: 2006

Olympic Games
- Teams: 5 (2010–2026)
- Medals: 0

World Championships
- Teams: 10 (2007–2019)
- Medals: 1 (0 gold)
Medal record
Representing Bulgaria
World Championships
Silver medal – second place	2019 Östersund	20 km individual
European Championships
Gold medal – first place	2017 Duszniki-Zdrój	10 km sprint
Bronze medal – third place	2016 Tyumen	15 km mass start
Bronze medal – third place	2015 Otepää	20 km individual
Universiade
Bronze medal – third place	2011 Erzurum	Mixed relay
Summer World Championships
Gold medal – first place	2015 Cheile Grădiștei	10 km sprint
Bronze medal – third place	2011 Nové Město	10 km sprint
World Military Games
Silver medal – second place	2017 Sochi	10 km sprint
Junior Summer World Championships
Bronze medal – third place	2007 Otepää	10 km sprint
- Updated on 09 February 2023

Vladimir Iliev Iliev (Bulgarian: Владимир Илиев Илиев; born 17 March 1987) is a Bulgarian biathlete.

== Career ==
He competed in the 2010 Winter Olympics for Bulgaria. His best performance was 16th, as part of the Bulgarian relay team. His best individual performance was 79th, in the individual and 83rd in the sprint.

Iliev participated and competed in the 2014 Winter Olympics. His best performance was 15th, as part of the Bulgarian relay team. His best individual performance was 38th, in the individual and 59rd in the sprint and 54th in the pursuit.

He competed at the 2018 Winter Olympics and finished 54th in the sprint, 46th in the pursuit, 19th in the individual and was part of the lapped relay.

As of February 2018, his best performance at the Biathlon World Championships, is 6th in the pursuit in 2015, his best Biathlon World Cup finish is 5th, in the sprint at Nové Město na Moravě in 2016/17, while his best overall finish in the Biathlon World Cup is 25th, in 2014/15.

On 13 March 2019, Iliev won silver in the 20km individual at the 2019 Biathlon World Championships in Östersund, Sweden – Bulgaria's best ever individual result in men's biathlon.

== Biathlon results ==
All results are sourced from the International Biathlon Union.

=== Olympic Games ===
0 medals

Event	Individual	Sprint	Pursuit	Mass start	Relay	Mixed relay
(Canada) 2010 Vancouver	79th	83rd	—	—	16th	—
(Russia) 2014 Sochi	38th	59th	54th	—	15th	—
(South Korea) 2018 Pyeongchang	19th	54th	46th	—	LAP	17th
(China) 2022 Beijing	61st	31st	25th	—	LAP (19th)	11th
(Italy) 2026 Milano-Cortina	75th	70th	—	—	12th	16th

:*The mixed relay was added as an event in 2014.

=== World Championships ===
1 medal (1 silver)

Event	Individual	Sprint	Pursuit	Mass start	Relay	Mixed relay	Single mixed relay
(Italy) 2007 Antholz	63rd	86th	—	—	18th	18th	—N/a
(Sweden) 2008 Östersund	—	96th	—	—	20th	—	—N/a
(South Korea) 2009 Pyeongchang	32nd	84th	—	—	14th	—	—N/a
(Russia) 2011 Khanty-Mansiysk	59th	68th	—	—	16th	—	—N/a
(Germany) 2012 Ruhpolding	16th	57th	DNS	—	17th	—	—N/a
(Czech Republic) 2013 Nové Město	DNF	42nd	39th	—	9th	—	—N/a
(Finland) 2015 Kontiolahti	27th	8th	6th	25th	16th	18th	—N/a
(Norway) 2016 Oslo Holmenkollen	21st	10th	24th	21st	13th	16th	—N/a
(Austria) 2017 Hochfilzen	24th	13th	18th	20th	9th	17th	—N/a
(Sweden) 2019 Östersund	Silver	38th	37th	29th	9th	21st	—
(Italy) 2020 Antholz	54th	58th	44th	–	11th	24th	—
(Slovenia) 2021 Pokljuka	12th	56th	37th	–	16th	15th	19th
(Germany) 2023 Oberhof	28th	20th	16th	29th	–	17th	–
(Czech Republic) 2024 Nové Město na Moravě	54th	DNS	–	–	–	22nd	–
(Switzerland) 2025 Lenzerheide	56th	25th	54th	—	15th	15th	—

*During Olympic seasons competitions are only held for those events not included in the Olympic program.
**The mixed relay was added as an event in 2005.
***The single mixed relay was added as an event in 2019.

Olympic Games
Preceded by Maria Zdravkova and Radoslav Yankov	Flagbearer for Bulgaria (with Alexandra Feigin); Milano Cortina 2026	Succeeded by
