= Figure skating at the 2011 Winter Universiade – Men's singles =

Figure skating at the 2011 Winter Universiade included a men's event for senior level skaters. The short program was held on February 1 and the free skating on February 2, 2011.

== Results ==
Rank	Name	Nation	Total points	SP		FS	
1	Nobunari Oda	Japan	223.15	1	77.04	1	146.11
2	Sergei Voronov	Russia	204.54	3	71.98	2	132.56
3	Daisuke Murakami	Japan	202.83	2	76.04	5	126.79
4	Guan Jinlin	China	195.74	4	65.58	3	130.16
5	Chafik Besseghier	France	186.22	12	57.44	4	128.78
6	Denis Leushin	Russia	181.93	5	63.91	7	118.02
7	Paolo Bacchini	Italy	180.53	10	59.38	6	121.15
8	Laurent Alvarez	Switzerland	174.37	8	59.68	8	114.69
9	Yannick Ponsero	France	172.30	7	61.85	11	110.45
10	Pavel Kaška	Czech Republic	167.30	11	57.65	12	109.65
11	Thomas Sosniak	France	164.76	14	53.65	10	111.11
12	Stanislav Pertsov	Ukraine	161.16	9	59.50	14	101.66
13	Xu Zuoren	China	160.90	13	56.91	13	103.99
14	Javier Raya	Spain	152.11	25	39.99	9	112.12
15	Stéphane Walker	Switzerland	147.22	15	51.55	15	95.67
16	Mario-Rafael Ionian	Austria	146.56	16	50.89	16	95.67
17	Dmytro Ihnatenko	Ukraine	140.37	17	45.02	17	95.35
18	Kutay Eryoldas	Turkey	136.83	20	42.76	18	94.07
19	Kevin Alves	Brazil	134.42	18	43.25	19	91.17
20	Anton Truvé	Sweden	128.68	21	41.94	20	86.74
21	Engin Ali Artan	Turkey	125.97	24	40.91	21	85.06
22	Takuya Kondoh	Japan	124.35	22	41.65	22	82.70
23	Ali Demirboga	Turkey	123.69	19	43.22	24	80.47
24	Fabio Mascarello	Italy	117.92	26	37.37	23	80.55
25	Samuli Tyyskä	Finland	116.83	23	41.60	27	75.23
26	Saulius Ambrulevičius	Lithuania	114.42	27	36.35	25	78.07
27	Alexei Mialionkhin	Belarus	112.85	28	35.59	26	77.26
28	Adrian Alvarado	Mexico	77.94	31	29.35	28	48.59
29	Adil Zharbolov	Kazakhstan	77.48	30	31.72	29	45.76
30	Hung-Wen Tien	Chinese Taipei	68.57	32	27.52	30	41.05
WD	Ivan Bariev	Russia		6	62.11		
WD	Artem Khramov	Kazakhstan		29	33.23		
WD	Boris Martinec	Croatia					

== Judges ==
- Referee: Ms. Gale TANGER (ISU)
- Technical Controller: Ms. Vera TAUCHMANOVA (ISU)
- Technical Specialist: Ms. Wilhelmina VAN VEEN (ISU)
- Assistant Technical Specialist: Ms. Vanessa GUSMEROLI (ISU)
- Judge No.1: Ms. Isabelle BERNARD BRULS (France)
- Judge No.2: Ms. Jia YAO (China)
- Judge No.3: Ms. Natalia BOGUSH (Russia)
- Judge No.4: Ms. Masako KUBOTA (Japan)
- Judge No.5: Ms. Beatrice PFISTER (Switzerland)
- Judge No.6: Mr. Yury BALKOV (Ukraine)
- Judge No.7: Ms. Senem AHISKAL (Turkey)
- Data Operator: Mr. Alexander KUZNETSOV (ISU)
- Replay Operator: Mr. Wieland LUEDERS (ISU)
