= Figure skating at the 2011 Winter Universiade – Ladies' singles =

Figure skating at the 2011 Winter Universiade included a ladies' event for senior level skaters. The short program was held on February 3 and the free skating on February 4, 2011.

== Results ==
Rank	Name	Nation	Total points	SP		FS	
1	Candice Didier	France	144.08	1	54.40	4	89.68
2	Sonia Lafuente	Spain	143.43	2	52.00	2	91.43
3	Shion Kokubun	Japan	141.80	3	51.08	3	90.72
4	Linnea Mellgren	Sweden	136.72	8	45.06	1	91.66
5	Shoko Ishikawa	Japan	131.30	4	49.90	8	81.40
6	Roberta Rodeghiero	Italy	129.17	10	44.42	6	84.75
7	Jelena Glebova	Estonia	127.87	13	42.52	5	85.35
8	Kerstin Frank	Austria	123.47	14	42.28	9	81.19
9	Daša Grm	Slovenia	121.80	12	43.54	10	78.26
10	Alice Garlisi	Italy	120.64	17	37.70	7	82.94
11	Maria Artemieva	Russia	120.64	6	46.40	12	74.24
12	Francesca Rio	Italy	115.91	15	39.94	11	75.97
13	Bettina Heim	Switzerland	114.75	5	46.48	17	68.27
14	Mari Suzuki	Japan	113.92	9	44.52	15	69.40
15	Andrea Kreuzer	Austria	110.05	7	45.12	18	64.93
16	Irina Movchan	Ukraine	109.02	16	39.40	14	69.62
17	Jiao Yunya	China	106.04	19	35.90	13	70.14
18	Constanze Paulinus	Germany	104.30	11	43.58	21	60.72
19	Henriikka Hietaniemi	Finland	102.97	20	34.06	16	68.91
20	Lejeanne Marais	South Africa	96.21	22	32.14	19	64.07
21	Myriam Leuenberger	Switzerland	94.48	18	37.28	24	57.20
22	Nika Ceric	Slovenia	93.32	21	33.92	22	59.40
23	Monica Gimeno	Spain	90.21	25	26.50	20	63.71
24	Sin Na-hee	South Korea	86.09	23	27.82	23	58.27
25	Renk Kemaloglu	Turkey	79.76	27	24.62	25	55.14
26	Victoria Liakhava	Belarus	75.90	24	27.64	27	48.26
27	Aida Rybalko	Lithuania	74.21	30	19.26	26	54.95
28	Elena Rodrigues	Brazil	72.48	26	25.72	29	46.76
29	Beril Bektas	Turkey	64.50	31	17.68	28	46.82
30	Alessia Baldo	Brazil	59.28	29	19.86	30	39.42
31	Kim Falconer	South Africa	57.88	28	22.64	31	35.24
32	Allysha Tan	Malaysia	48.57	32	17.40	32	31.17
WD	Minna Parviainen	Finland					
WD	Ekaterina Kozireva	Russia					
