= Evgeniy Garanichev =

Russian biathlete

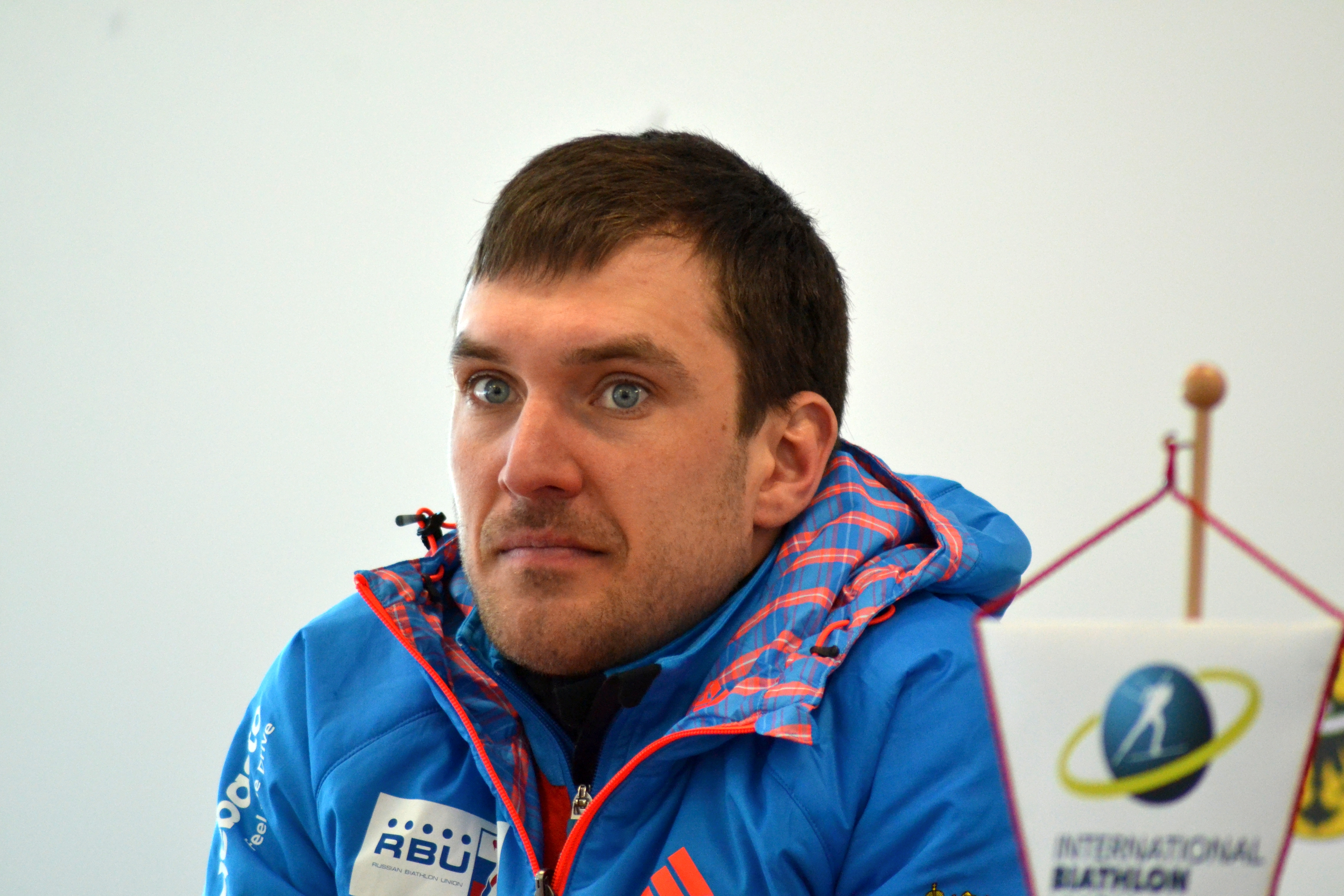
- Garanichev in 2017

Personal information
- Full name: Evgeniy Aleksandrovich Garanichev
- Born: 13 February 1988 (age 38) Novoilyinsky, Perm Krai, RSFSR, Soviet Union
- Height: 1.75 m (5 ft 9 in)

Sport

Professional information
- Sport: Biathlon
- World Cup debut: 20 January 2011

Olympic Games
- Teams: 1 (2014)
- Medals: 1 (0 gold)

World Championships
- Teams: 7 (2012–2019, 2021)
- Medals: 0

World Cup
- Seasons: 10 (2010/11–)
- Individual victories: 1
- All victories: 8
- Individual podiums: 15
- All podiums: 27
Medal record
Men's biathlon
Representing Russia
Olympic Games
Bronze medal – third place	2014 Sochi	20 km individual
European Championships
Gold medal – first place	2016 Tumen	10 km sprint
Gold medal – first place	2016 Tumen	Mixed relay
Gold medal – first place	2017 Duszniki-Zdrój	Single mixed relay
Silver medal – second place	2016 Tumen	12.5 km pursuit
Silver medal – second place	2017 Duszniki-Zdrój	12.5 km pursuit
Silver medal – second place	2018 Ridnaun	Mixed relay
Bronze medal – third place	2018 Ridnaun	12.5 km pursuit
Bronze medal – third place	2021 Duszniki-Zdrój	Single mixed relay
Winter Universiade
Silver medal – second place	2011 Erzurum	Mixed relay
Bronze medal – third place	2011 Erzurum	10 km sprint
Bronze medal – third place	2011 Erzurum	12.5 km pursuit
Men's cross-country skiing
Junior World Championships
Gold medal – first place	2008 Mals	4 × 5 km relay
- Updated on 10 March 2019

Evgeniy Aleksandrovich Garanichev (Russian: Евгений Александрович Гараничев; born 13 February 1988) is a former Russian biathlete, who has been competing on the World Cup circuit since the 2010–11 season. He has had five Top 10 finishes in World Cup races in individual races. He got his first win in individual races on 3 February 2012.

== Career ==
=== 2011 Winter Universiade ===
Evgeniy participated in 2011 Winter Universiade and got 3 medals.

=== 2010–11 World Cup Season ===
His debut was in Antholz, Italy. It was his only event.

2010–11 World Cup season results
No.	World Cup location	Individual	Sprint	Pursuit	Mass Start	Relay	Mixed relay
1	Östersund, Sweden	–	–	–	–	–	–
2	Hochfilzen, Austria	–	–	–	–	–	–
3	Pokljuka, Slovenia	–	–	–	–	–	–
4	Oberhof, Germany	–	–	–	–	–	–
5	Ruhpolding, Germany	–	–	–	–	–	–
6	Antholz, Italy	–	13	–	24	4	–
7	Presque Isle, United States	–	–	–	–	–	–
8	Fort Kent, United States	–	–	–	–	–	–
WCH	Khanty-Mansiysk, Russia	–	–	–	–	–	–
9	Oslo, Norway	–	–	–	–	–	–
Key:"—" denotes discipline not held; DNS—Did not start; WCH—World Championships

=== 2011–12 World Cup Season ===
He started his second season in Östersund, Sweden with 10 place in individual and 63 in sprint. In Hochfilzen, Austria he was 30 and 32 in sprint and pursuit. After this he was out from World Cup team. He won sprint and pursuit in IBU Cup in Obertilliach. In Oberhof relay was only his race and he scored first podium – 2 place. In Nové Město, Czech Republic he returned to World Cup with his best individual result in career – 7 place in pursuit. In Antholz, Italy he scored his first individual World Cup podium – 2 in sprint. In Oslo, Norway he scored his first win (sprint) and finished 3rd in Pursuit and Mass start. He entered to Oslo's events at 25 place in World Cup Standings and jumped up to 15 place after Mass start. At the Biathlon World Championships 2012 he competed in sprint, pursuit, mass start and relay. His best finish was 9th place at mass start and 6th at relay. In sprint and pursuit he was 14 and 12. At the overall standings he was at 12th position with 585 points after 20 races from 26. He collected 1 win, 1 2nd place and 2 3rd place finishes in personal races and once he was 2nd at relay.

2011–12 World Cup season results
No.	World Cup location	Individual	Sprint	Pursuit	Mass Start	Relay	Mixed relay
1	Östersund, Sweden	10	63	–	–	–	–
2	Hochfilzen, Austria	–	30	32	–	–	–
3	Hochfilzen, Austria	–	–	–	–	–	–
4	Oberhof, Germany	–	–	–	–	2	–
5	Nové Město, Czech Republic	23	19	7	–	–	–
6	Antholz, Italy	–	2	–	16	4	–
7	Oslo, Norway	–	1	3	3	–	–
8	Kontiolahti, Finland	–	19	5	–	–	–
WCH	Ruhpolding, Germany	–	14	12	9	6	–
9	Khanty-Mansiysk, Russia	–	15	25	10	–	–
Key:"—" denotes discipline not held; DNS—Did not start; WCH—World Championships

=== 2012–13 World Cup Season ===
2012–13 World Cup season was first full-schedule season for Evgeniy. His first race was individual race in Östersund, Sweden. He finished at 19th place. The same result he did in sprint and his first finish in Top10 was in pursuit – 9th place. In Hochfilzen, Austria's sprint he demonstrated worst result since 2011–12 Östersund, Sweden's sprint (63rd) – he was 45th, but on the next day he gained 32 places and finished 13th. In Pokljuka, Slovenia he showed his best results of the season to the date in sprint – 14th place and pursuit – 4th place. In Oberhof he scored 3 podiums in 3 races: he has run 2nd leg in relay, which Russia win. After this he was twice at 2nd place in sprint and pursuit, right behind his teammate Dmitry Malyshko. He entered at the WC 4 at 8th place and after sprint and pursuit he jumped up to 5th place.

2012–13 World Cup season results
No.	World Cup location	Individual	Sprint	Pursuit	Mass Start	Relay	Mixed relay
1	Östersund, Sweden	18	19	9	–	–	–
2	Hochfilzen, Austria	–	45	13	–	–	–
3	Pokljuka, Slovenia	–	14	4	8	–	–
4	Oberhof, Germany	–	2	2	–	1	–
5	Ruhpolding, Germany	–	–	–	–	–	–
6	Antholz, Italy	–	–	–	–	–	–
WCH	Nové Město, Czech Republic	–	–	–	–	–	–
7	Oslo, Norway	–	–	–	–	–	–
8	Sochi, Russia	–	–	–	–	–	–
9	Khanty-Mansiysk, Russia	–	–	–	–	–	–
Key:"—" denotes discipline not held; DNS—Did not start; WCH—World Championships

== Results ==
=== Olympics ===
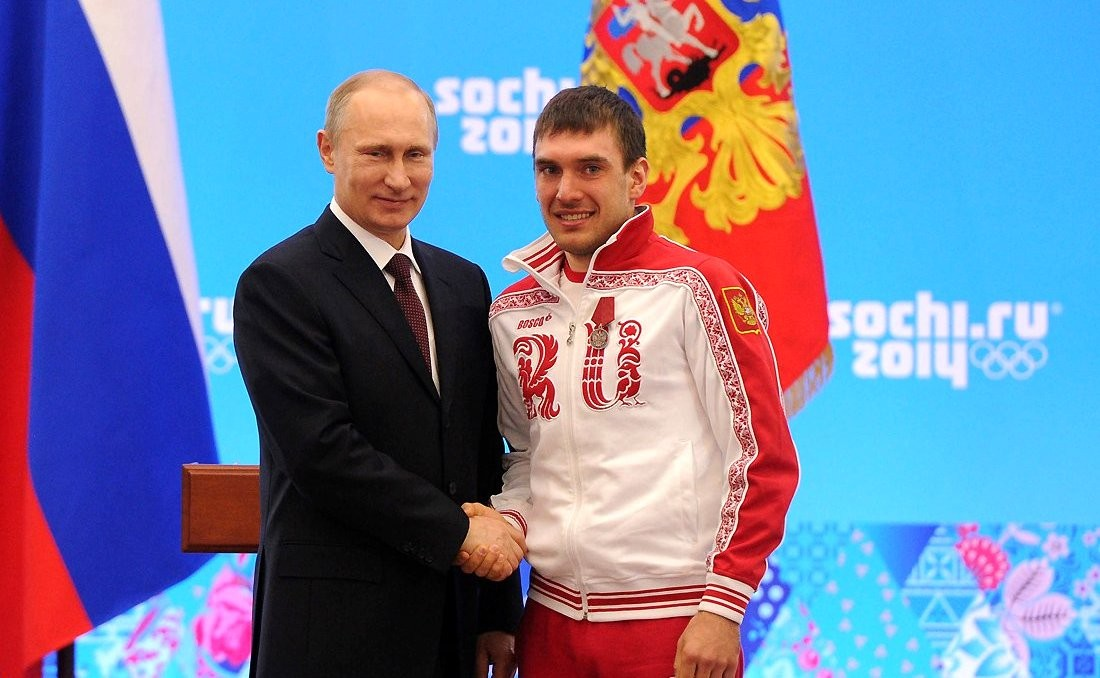
Garanichev with Vladimir Putin in 2014.

Event	Individual	Sprint	Pursuit	Mass start	Relay	Mixed relay
(Russia) 2014 Sochi	Bronze	27th	15th	5th	—	DSQ (4th)

=== World Championships ===
Event	Individual	Sprint	Pursuit	Mass start	Relay	Mixed relay	Single mixed relay
(Germany) 2012 Ruhpolding	—	12th	14th	9th	6th	—	—N/a
(Czech Republic) 2013 Nové Město	—	19th	28th	25th	4th	—	—N/a
(Finland) 2015 Kontiolahti	35th	6th	22nd	11th	4th	—	—N/a
(Norway) 2016 Oslo	8th	6th	11th	23rd	6th	7th	—N/a
(Austria) 2017 Hochfilzen	20th	10th	20th	11th	—	—	—N/a
(Sweden) 2019 Östersund	7th	19th	9th	16th	—	—	—
(Slovenia) 2021 Pokljuka	16th	—	—	—	—	—	—

*The single mixed relay was added as an event in 2019.

=== Winter Universiade ===
Event	Individual	Sprint	Pursuit	Mass Start	Mixed Relay
(Turkey) 2011 Erzurum	–	Bronze	Bronze	–	Silver

=== Individual victories ===
No.	Season	Date	Location	Discipline	Level
1	2011/12	2 February 2012	(Norway) Holmenkollen	10 km Sprint	World Cup

*Results are from IBU races which include the Biathlon World Cup, Biathlon World Championships and the Winter Olympic Games.

=== Biathlon World Cup ===
Overall record

Result	Individual	Sprint	Pursuit	Mass Start	Relay	Mixed Relay	Total		
Result	Individual	Sprint	Pursuit	Mass Start	Relay	Mixed Relay	Individual events	Team events	All events
1st place		1			6		1	6	7
2nd place	1	4	1		3		6	3	9
3rd place		1	3	3	3		7	3	10
Podiums	1	6	4	3	12		14	12	26
Top 10									
Points									
Starts									

Season Standings

Season	Individual			Sprint			Pursuit			Mass Start			Overall		
Season	Races	Points	Position	Races	Points	Position	Races	Points	Position	Races	Points	Position	Races	Points	Position
2010–11	0/4	0	–	1/10	28	67th	0/7	0	–	1/5	17	52nd	2/26	45	72nd
2011–12	2/3	49	19th	8/10	224	12th	6/8	176	13th	4/5	136	10th	20/26	585	12th
2012–13	2/3	27	42nd	9/10	214	12th	7/8	217	7th	4/5	101	18th	22/26	559	14th
2013–14	2/2		27th	8/9		25th	8/8		16th	1/3		27th	19/22		25th
2014–15	3/3	86	9th	10/10	258	6th	7/7	179	9th	5/5	117	13th	25/25	635	7th
2015–16	3/3	82	8th	8/9	205	11th	7/8	219	8th	5/5	153	5th	23/25	659	7th
2016–17	3/3	68	14th	8/9	143	20th	8/9	194	14th	3/5	90	22nd	22/26	495	18th
2017–18	2/2	0	–	7/8	76	31st	6/7	91	27th	2/5	45	30th	17/22	212	31st
2018–19															
2019–20	3/3	63	15th	8/8	47	48th	5/5	64	25th	0/5	0	-	16/21	174	32nd
2020–21	2/3	52	16th	7/10	85	32nd	6/8	81	27th	3/5	42	29th	18/26	240	27th

*Key:Races—number of entered races/all races; Points—won World Cup points; Position—World Cup season ranking.
