= Serhiy Semenov =

Ukrainian biathlete (born 1988)

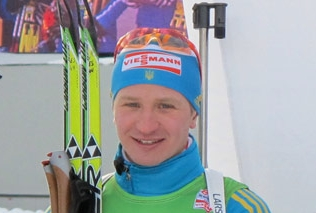

Personal information
- Full name: Serhiy Oleksandrovych Semenov
- Born: 28 July 1988 (age 38) Chernihiv, Ukrainian SSR
- Height: 1.79 m (5 ft 10 in)

Sport
- Sport: Skiing
- Club: Ukraina

World Cup career
- Seasons: 2009–
- Indiv. podiums: 5 (incl. 1 at World Champ.)
Medal record
World Championships
Silver medal – second place	2011 Khanty-Mansiysk	Relay
Bronze medal – third place	2016 Oslo	Sprint
European Championships
Gold medal – first place	2013 Bansko	Individual
Gold medal – first place	2015 Otepää	Relay
Silver medal – second place	2012 Osorblie	Pursuit
Silver medal – second place	2015 Otepää	Individual
Junior European Championships
Silver medal – second place	2009 Ufa	Individual
Winter Universiade
Gold medal – first place	2011 Erzurum	Pursuit
Gold medal – first place	2011 Erzurum	Mixed relay
Silver medal – second place	2011 Erzurum	Sprint
Bronze medal – third place	2009 Harbin	Individual

Serhiy Oleksandrovych Semenov (Ukrainian: Сергій Олександрович Семенов; born 28 July 1988 in Chernihiv, Ukrainian SSR) is a Ukrainian biathlete. He is first Ukrainian male biathlete to win a World Cup title in a single discipline, having become World Cup champion in the individual in the 2014–15 season. He is two-time World Championships medalist.

== Career ==
His first international competition was 2005 Junior Worlds but he participated only in individual race where he was 38th. He missed next season returning in 2007. In Martell he had much better achievements than previously. Next two years he mainly participated in junior competitions and only once in IBU Cup. The most successful competition in his early career was 2009 European championships in Ufa, Russia, where he won silver in individual race and was 4th in sprint and pursuit.

He debuted in World Cup in 2009-10 season. On December 17, 2009, he was just 50th in individual in Pokljuka, Slovenia. After few days he finished 19th in sprint and 21st in pursuit. He also took part in two sprints in Oberhof (16th) and Antholz-Anterselva (13th). Due to such good results he got a place in national team for 2010 Winter Olympics. At those Games his best result was 33rd in sprint. He didn't manage to get a place in relay team.

2010–11 season was marked with mixed relay podium in Pokljuka and World Championships. The first ever World Championships medal was won at 2011 Worlds in Khanty-Mansiysk, Russia, when Ukrainian men's rely team (Semenov together with Deryzemlya, Sednev and Bilanenko) unexpectedly won bronze. It was also Serhiy's debut at these competitions. At 2011 Winter Universiade he won two gold and one silver medal. Semenov also won a silver medal at 2012, one gold at 2013 and two silver medals at 2015 European championships.

On March 7, 2013, he had his first World Cup podium in individual in Sochi, Russia. In 2014 together with Valj Semerenko he won World Team Challenge. They became second Ukrainian pair to win these competitions after Andriy Deryzemlya and Oksana Khvostenko won in 2008.

Semenov participated at 2014 Winter Olympics in Sochi, Russia. His best personal finish was 9th in individual race.

In 2014–15 season he won Small World Cup in individual races. That season he was 2nd in Östersund, 3rd in Holmenkollen and 5th at Worlds in Kontiolahti. His shooting statistics in individual races was 96,7% (58/60). Semenov later stated in a TV-interview that individual isn't his favourite discipline but still he shows the best results in individual races. That season he also had one mixed relay podium.

Serhiy won bronze medal in sprint at 2016 World Championships.

He qualified to represent Ukraine at the 2018 Winter Olympics. Due to poor physical conditions and illnesses he didn't show good results being just 46th in sprint.

== Career results ==
=== Winter Olympics ===
Event	Individual	Sprint	Pursuit	Mass start	Relay	Mixed relay
(Canada) 2010 Vancouver	52	33	39	—	—	—
(Russia) 2014 Sochi	9	41	39	—	9	7
(South Korea) 2018 Pyeongchang	53	46	49	—	9	—

=== World Championships ===
Event	Individual	Sprint	Pursuit	Mass start	Relay	Mixed relay
(Russia) 2011 Khanty-Mansiysk	20	28	15	22	2	8
(Germany) 2012 Ruhpolding	60	22	49	—	8	14
(Czech Republic) 2013 Nové Město	—	41	45	—	14	—
(Finland) 2015 Kontiolahti	5	26	11	27	9	11
(Norway) 2016 Oslo Holmenkollen	55	3	8	8	16	4
(Austria) 2017 Hochfilzen	5	41	15	27	6	5
(Sweden) 2019 Östersund	69th	—	—	—	12th	—
(Italy) 2020 Rasen-Antholz	31st	42nd	41st	—	12th	—

=== World Cup ===
==== Individual podiums ====
Season	Place	Competition	Rank
2012–13	Sochi, Russia	Individual	3
2014–15	Östersund, Sweden	Individual	2
2014–15	Holmenkollen, Norway	Individual	3
2016–17	Antholz-Anterselva, Italy	Individual	3

==== Relay podiums ====
Season	Place	Competition	Rank
2010–11	Pokljuka, Slovenia	Mixed relay	2
2013–14	Östersund, Sweden	Mixed relay	3
2014–15	Nové Město, Czech Republic	Mixed relay	3
2016–17	Kontiolahti, Finland	Mixed relay	3

==== Rankings ====
Season	Individual	Sprint	Pursuit	Mass start	Total
2009–10	—	30	48	—	47
2010–11	39	26	43	36	35
2011–12	—	37	36	41	42
2012–13	19	39	43	—	42
2013–14	10	22	36	18	23
2014–15	1	34	24	45	26
2015–16	31	16	19	28	21
2016–17	7	22	32	20	23
