= David Hofer =

Italian cross-country skier

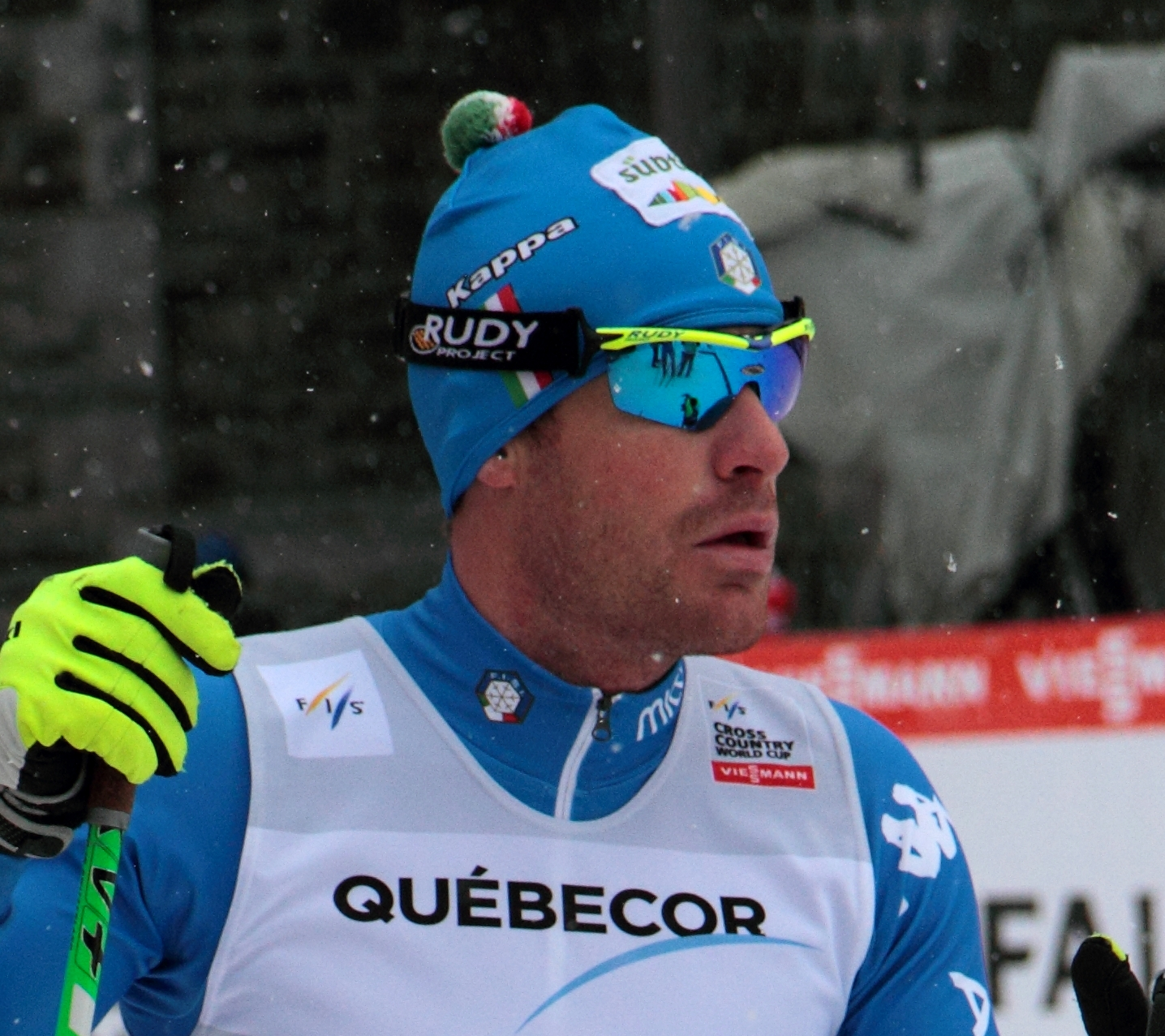
- Hofer in 2012

Personal information
- Nationality: Italy
- Born: 21 June 1983 (age 43) Bolzano, Italy

Sport
- Sport: Skiing
- Club: C.S. Carabinieri

World Cup career
- Seasons: 10 – (2006–2015)
- Indiv. starts: 138
- Indiv. podiums: 1
- Indiv. wins: 0
- Team starts: 16
- Team podiums: 2
- Team wins: 0
- Overall titles: 0 – (29th in 2009)
- Discipline titles: 0
- Updated on 16 April 2019

David Hofer (born 21 June 1983) is an Italian cross-country skier who has competed since 2002. At the 2010 Winter Olympics in Vancouver, he finished 39th in the individual sprint and 53rd in the 15 km + 15 km double pursuit events.

At the FIS Nordic World Ski Championships 2009 in Liberec, Hofer finished 37th in the 50 km and 58th in the 15 km events.

== Cross-country skiing results ==
All results are sourced from the International Ski Federation (FIS).

=== Olympic Games ===
| Year | Age | 15 km individual | 30 km skiathlon | 50 km mass start | Sprint | 4 × 10 km relay | Team sprint |
|---|---|---|---|---|---|---|---|
| 2010 | 26 | — | 53 | — | 39 | — | — |
| 2014 | 30 | — | — | 16 | 15 | 5 | — |

=== World Championships ===
| Year | Age | 15 km individual | 30 km skiathlon | 50 km mass start | Sprint | 4 × 10 km relay | Team sprint |
|---|---|---|---|---|---|---|---|
| 2009 | 25 | 58 | — | 36 | — | — | — |
| 2011 | 27 | 38 | — | — | 18 | — | — |
| 2013 | 29 | 13 | — | — | — | 4 | 5 |
| 2015 | 31 | 43 | 32 | — | — | — | — |

=== World Cup ===
==== Season standings ====
| Season | Age | Discipline standings | | | Ski Tour standings | | |
| Season | Age | Overall | Distance | Sprint | Nordic Opening | Tour de Ski | World Cup Final |
|---|---|---|---|---|---|---|---|
| 2006 | 22 | NC | — | NC | —N/a | —N/a | —N/a |
| 2007 | 23 | NC | NC | — | —N/a | — | —N/a |
| 2008 | 24 | NC | NC | — | —N/a | — | — |
| 2009 | 25 | 29 | 31 | 23 | —N/a | 24 | 60 |
| 2010 | 26 | 68 | 52 | 53 | —N/a | DNF | — |
| 2011 | 27 | 56 | 79 | 25 | 34 | DNF | — |
| 2012 | 28 | 45 | 40 | 24 | 39 | 34 | 28 |
| 2013 | 29 | 38 | 34 | 25 | DNF | DNF | 45 |
| 2014 | 30 | 93 | NC | 43 | 55 | DNF | — |
| 2015 | 31 | 131 | 80 | 93 | 74 | 40 | —N/a |

==== Individual podiums ====
- 1 podium – (1 WC)

| No. | Season | Date | Location | Race | Level | Place |
|---|---|---|---|---|---|---|
| 1 | 2012–13 | 1 February 2013 | Sochi, Russia | 1.8 km Sprint F | World Cup | 3rd |

==== Team podiums ====
- 2 podiums – (2 TS)

| No. | Season | Date | Location | Race | Level | Place | Teammate |
|---|---|---|---|---|---|---|---|
| 1 | 2010–11 | 5 December 2010 | Düsseldorf, Germany | 6 × 1.6 km Team Sprint F | World Cup | 3rd | Pasini |
| 2 | 2011–12 | 15 January 2012 | Milan, Italy | 6 × 1.4 km Team Sprint F | World Cup | 3rd | Scola |
