= FIS Nordic World Ski Championships 2013 – Men's sprint =

Men's sprint at the FIS Nordic World Ski Championships 2013
- Date: 21 February 2013
- Competitors: 72
- Winning time: 3:30.4

Medalists
| gold medal | Nikita Kryukov | Russia |
| silver medal | Petter Northug | Norway |
| bronze medal | Alex Harvey | Canada |

The men's sprint in the FIS Nordic World Ski Championships 2013 was held on 21 February 2013. The qualifying was held in the morning to determine the final participants.

Nikita Kryukov of Russia won the gold medal, while Petter Northug of Norway repeated his silver from the previous championships, and Alex Harvey of Canada claimed the bronze medal. Defending champion Marcus Hellner of Sweden did not participate in the event.

== Qualification ==
| Rank | Bib | Athlete | Country | Time | Deficit | Note |
|---|---|---|---|---|---|---|
| 1 | 20 | Nikita Kryukov | Russia | 3:29.75 | | Q |
| 2 | 15 | Alexey Poltoranin | Kazakhstan | 3:30.05 | +0.30 | Q |
| 3 | 12 | Anssi Pentsinen | Finland | 3:30.25 | +0.50 | Q |
| 4 | 22 | Emil Jönsson | Sweden | 3:30.41 | +0.66 | Q |
| 5 | 19 | Dmitriy Yaparov | Russia | 3:31.36 | +1.61 | Q |
| 6 | 9 | Ola Vigen Hattestad | Norway | 3:32.46 | +2.71 | Q |
| 7 | 17 | Andrew Newell | United States | 3:32.68 | +2.93 | Q |
| 8 | 14 | Eirik Brandsdal | Norway | 3:32.96 | +3.21 | Q |
| 9 | 28 | Calle Halfvarsson | Sweden | 3:32.98 | +3.23 | Q |
| 10 | 21 | Pål Golberg | Norway | 3:33.44 | +3.69 | Q |
| 11 | 24 | Nikolay Chebotko | Kazakhstan | 3:33.68 | +3.93 | Q |
| 12 | 3 | Alexander Panzhinskiy | Russia | 3:33.85 | +4.10 | Q |
| 13 | 26 | Petter Northug | Norway | 3:34.02 | 4.27 | Q |
| 14 | 10 | Matias Strandvall | Finland | 3:34.11 | +4.36 | Q |
| 15 | 11 | Mikhail Devyatyarov, Jr. | Russia | 3:34.44 | +4.69 | Q |
| 16 | 42 | Cyril Miranda | France | 3:34.45 | +4.70 | Q |
| 17 | 34 | Gianluca Cologna | Switzerland | 3:34.65 | +4.90 | Q |
| 18 | 16 | Kalle Lassila | Finland | 3:34.80 | +5.05 | Q |
| 19 | 18 | Teodor Peterson | Sweden | 3:35.35 | +5.60 | Q |
| 20 | 45 | Yuichi Onda | Japan | 3:35.95 | +6.20 | Q |
| 21 | 47 | Axel Teichmann | Germany | 3:35.98 | +6.23 | Q |
| 22 | 46 | Hiroyuki Miyazawa | Japan | 3:36.02 | +6.27 | Q |
| 23 | 27 | Federico Pellegrino | Italy | 3:36.06 | +6.31 | Q |
| 24 | 6 | Toni Ketelä | Finland | 3:36.15 | +6.40 | Q |
| 25 | 23 | Tim Tscharnke | Germany | 3:36.36 | +6.61 | Q |
| 26 | 8 | Alex Harvey | Canada | 3:36.42 | +6.67 | Q |
| 27 | 33 | Fabio Pasini | Italy | 3:37.10 | +7.35 | Q |
| 28 | 7 | Jovian Hediger | Switzerland | 3:37.19 | +7.44 | Q |
| 29 | 29 | Jens Eriksson | Sweden | 3:37.22 | +7.47 | Q |
| 30 | 51 | Sun Qinghai | China | 3:37.42 | +7.67 | Q |
| 31 | 32 | Aleš Razym | Czech Republic | 3:37.75 | +8.00 | |
| 32 | 38 | Maciej Kreczmer | Poland | 3:38.31 | +8.56 | |
| 33 | 2 | Peeter Kümmel | Estonia | 3:38.42 | +8.67 | |
| 34 | 5 | Simi Hamilton | United States | 3:38.50 | +8.75 | |
| 35 | 48 | Dietmar Nöckler | Italy | 3:38.51 | +8.76 | |
| 36 | 36 | Fulvio Scola | Italy | 3:38.68 | +8.93 | |
| 37 | 49 | Valerio Leccardi | Switzerland | 3:38.77 | +9.02 | |
| 38 | 55 | Peter Mlynár | Slovakia | 3:39.69 | +9.94 | |
| 39 | 31 | Anti Saarepuu | Estonia | 3:39.90 | +10.15 | |
| 40 | 13 | Len Väljas | Canada | 3:40.31 | +10.56 | |
| 41 | 1 | Maciej Staręga | Poland | 3:40.62 | +10.87 | |
| 42 | 57 | Yevgeniy Koshevoy | Kazakhstan | 3:41.17 | +11.42 | |
| 43 | 30 | Sebastian Eisenlauer | Germany | 3:41.96 | +12.21 | |
| 44 | 44 | Alexander Wolz | Germany | 3:42.09 | +12.34 | |
| 45 | 56 | Andrew Young | Great Britain | 3:42.31 | +12.56 | |
| 46 | 25 | Devon Kershaw | Canada | 3:42.44 | +12.69 | |
| 47 | 37 | Ueli Schnider | Switzerland | 3:42.68 | +12.93 | |
| 48 | 50 | Max Hauke | Austria | 3:43.18 | +13.43 | |
| 49 | 4 | Philip Widmer | Canada | 3:43.60 | +13.85 | |
| 50 | 35 | Denis Volotka | Kazakhstan | 3:44.18 | +14.43 | |
| 51 | 43 | Erik Bjornsen | United States | 3:44.44 | +14.69 | |
| 52 | 59 | Aurelius Herburger | Austria | 3:45.88 | +16.13 | |
| 53 | 39 | Kein Einaste | Estonia | 3:46.16 | +16.41 | |
| 54 | 67 | Xu Wenlong | China | 3:46.39 | +16.64 | |
| 55 | 53 | Jan Barton | Czech Republic | 3:46.99 | +17.24 | |
| 56 | 80 | Oleksiy Shvidkiy | Ukraine | 3:47.79 | +18.04 | |
| 57 | 40 | Raido Rankel | Estonia | 3:48.24 | +18.49 | |
| 58 | 70 | Alexander Lasutkin | Belarus | 3:48.39 | +18.64 | |
| 59 | 77 | Aliaksandr Ionenkau | Belarus | 3:48.40 | +18.65 | |
| 60 | 63 | Sebastian Gazurek | Poland | 3:48.59 | +18.84 | |
| 61 | 64 | Nils Koons | New Zealand | 3:50.99 | +21.24 | |
| 62 | 60 | Ondřej Horyna | Czech Republic | 3:51.00 | +21.25 | |
| 63 | 61 | Rok Tršan | Slovenia | 3:51.47 | +21.72 | |
| 64 | 133 | Pavel Andreiv | Kyrgyzstan | 3:51.49 | +21.74 | |
| 65 | 41 | Dušan Kožíšek | Czech Republic | 3:51.67 | +21.92 | |
| 66 | 52 | Ruslan Perekhoda | Ukraine | 3:51.87 | +22.12 | |
| 67 | 87 | Martin Kapso | Slovakia | 3:51.90 | +22.15 | |
| 68 | 78 | Paul Constantin Pepene | Romania | 3:52.27 | +22.52 | |
| 69 | 66 | Boštjan Klavžar | Slovenia | 3:52.36 | +22.61 | |
| 70 | 54 | Aliaksandr Voranau | Belarus | 3:52.87 | +23.12 | |
| 71 | 69 | Veselin Tzinzov | Bulgaria | 3:53.85 | +24.10 | |
| 72 | 83 | Andrej Burić | Croatia | 3:54.75 | +25.00 | |
| 73 | 85 | Lasse Mølgaard | Denmark | 3:54.78 | +25.03 | |
| 74 | 58 | Phillip Bellingham | Australia | 3:54.80 | +25.05 | |
| 75 | 65 | Mark van der Ploeg | Australia | 3:55.63 | +25.88 | |
| 76 | 73 | Sergey Mikayelyan | Armenia | 3:57.08 | +27.33 | |
| 77 | 79 | Martin Møller | Denmark | 3:58.17 | +28.42 | |
| 78 | 88 | Edi Dadić | Croatia | 3:58.35 | +28.60 | |
| 79 | 84 | Callum Smith | Great Britain | 4:01.50 | +31.75 | |
| 80 | 95 | Oleksiy Krasovsky | Ukraine | 4:01.75 | +32.00 | |
| 81 | 75 | Andrej Segec | Slovakia | 4:01.91 | +32.16 | |
| 82 | 68 | Vytautas Strolia | Lithuania | 4:02.56 | +32.81 | |
| 83 | 81 | Kari Peters | Luxembourg | 4:03.29 | +33.54 | |
| 84 | 76 | Pavels Ribakovs | Latvia | 4:03.31 | +33.56 | |
| 85 | 71 | Petrică Hogiu | Romania | 4:03.96 | +34.21 | |
| 86 | 98 | Viorel Andrei Palici | Romania | 4:04.03 | +34.28 | |
| 87 | 82 | Alexander Standen | Great Britain | 4:04.31 | +34.56 | |
| 88 | 74 | Lasse Hulgaard | Denmark | 4:06.02 | +36.27 | |
| 89 | 104 | Tadevos Poghosyan | Armenia | 4:07.85 | +38.10 | |
| 90 | 94 | Aigars Kalnups | Latvia | 4:08.97 | +39.22 | |
| 91 | 91 | Lukas Jakeliunas | Lithuania | 4:09.04 | +39.29 | |
| 92 | 72 | Sævar Birgisson | Iceland | 4:09.32 | +39.57 | |
| 93 | 93 | Asger Fischer Mølgaard | Denmark | 4:09.77 | +40.02 | |
| 94 | 89 | Janis Puida | Latvia | 4:10.70 | +40.95 | |
| 95 | 117 | Vasyl Koval | Ukraine | 4:11.06 | +41.31 | |
| 96 | 86 | Andrew Pohl | New Zealand | 4:14.25 | +44.50 | |
| 97 | 103 | Carlos Lannes | Argentina | 4:15.80 | +46.05 | |
| 98 | 105 | Artur Yeghoyan | Armenia | 4:15.99 | +46.24 | |
| 99 | 90 | Sattar Seyd | Iran | 4:20.17 | +50.42 | |
| 100 | 108 | Tumur Dorjgotov | Mongolia | 4:24.40 | +54.65 | |
| 101 | 92 | Alexis Gkounko | Greece | 4:26.27 | +56.52 | |
| 102 | 102 | Victor Pinzaru | Moldova | 4:27.84 | +58.09 | |
| 103 | 120 | Thorsten Langer | Belgium | 4:30.50 | +1:00.75 | |
| 104 | 97 | Yasin Shemshaki | Iran | 4:32.74 | +1:02.99 | |
| 105 | 118 | Marton Pálfy | Hungary | 4:33.89 | +1:04.14 | |
| 106 | 96 | Leandro Ribela | Brazil | 4:34.13 | +1:04.38 | |
| 107 | 100 | Dimitrios Kappas | Greece | 4:34.56 | +1:04.81 | |
| 108 | 116 | Darko Damjanovski | Macedonia | 4:36.59 | +1:06.84 | |
| 109 | 110 | Apostolos Aggelis | Greece | 4:36.84 | +1:07.09 | |
| 110 | 128 | Csaba Cseke | Hungary | 4:38.74 | +1:08.99 | |
| 111 | 121 | Stephan Langer | Belgium | 4:39.96 | +1:10.21 | |
| 112 | 99 | Alireza Moghdid | Iran | 4:40.31 | +1:10.56 | |
| 113 | 111 | Ivan Burgov | Bulgaria | 4:42.44 | +1:12.69 | |
| 114 | 106 | Abolfazl Savei | Iran | 4:43.23 | +1:13.48 | |
| 115 | 131 | Damir Jurcević | Croatia | 4:45.28 | +1:15.53 | |
| 116 | 109 | Myasnik Gharibyan | Armenia | 4:47.26 | +1:17.51 | |
| 117 | 134 | Evgeni Kirilov | Kyrgyzstan | 4:49.47 | +1:19.72 | |
| 118 | 107 | Kleanthis Karamichas | Greece | 4:53.29 | +1:23.54 | |
| 119 | 129 | Colum O'Farrell | Ireland | 4:53.67 | +1:23.92 | |
| 120 | 125 | Sveatoslav Maliutin | Moldova | 5:02.63 | +1:32.88 | |
| 121 | 119 | Gjorgji Icoski | Macedonia | 5:04.33 | +1:34.58 | |
| 122 | 115 | Roberto Carcelen | Peru | 5:08.57 | +1:38.82 | |
| 123 | 130 | Alen Kufner | Croatia | 5:15.87 | +1:46.12 | |
| 124 | 112 | Pavle Kurunoski | Macedonia | 5:24.27 | +1:54.52 | |
| 125 | 126 | Liviu Dubalari | Moldova | 5:25.29 | +1:55.54 | |
| 126 | 113 | Velce Georgieski | Macedonia | 5:30.97 | +2:01.22 | |
| 127 | 114 | Cesar Baena | Venezuela | 5:44.99 | +2:15.24 | |
| 128 | 136 | Conor McLaughlin | Ireland | 6:13.08 | +2:43.33 | |
| 129 | 127 | Viossi-Akpedje Madja | Togo | 7:19.09 | +3:49.34 | |
| | 62 | Arvis Liepiņš | Latvia | DNS | | |
| | 101 | Zhou Hu | China | DNS | | |
| | 122 | Nadeem Iqbal | India | DNS | | |
| | 123 | Nicolae Gaiduc | Moldova | DNS | | |
| | 124 | Jagdish Singh | India | DNS | | |
| | 132 | Dachhiri Sherpa | Nepal | DNS | | |
| | 135 | Balázs Gond | Hungary | DNS | | |

== Quarterfinals ==
=== Quarterfinal 1 ===
| Rank | Seed | Athlete | Country | Time | Deficit | Note |
|---|---|---|---|---|---|---|
| 1 | 10 | Pål Golberg | Norway | 3:32.7 | | Q |
| 2 | 1 | Nikita Kryukov | Russia | 3:32.7 | +0.0 | Q |
| 3 | 11 | Nikolay Chebotko | Kazakhstan | 3:32.8 | +0.1 | |
| 4 | 20 | Yuichi Onda | Japan | 3:33.3 | +0.6 | |
| 5 | 21 | Axel Teichmann | Germany | 3:34.3 | +1.6 | |
| 6 | 30 | Sun Qinghai | China | 3:35.9 | +3.2 | |

=== Quarterfinal 2 ===
| Rank | Seed | Athlete | Country | Time | Deficit | Note |
|---|---|---|---|---|---|---|
| 1 | 4 | Emil Jönsson | Sweden | 3:30.5 | | Q |
| 2 | 24 | Toni Ketelä | Finland | 3:30.8 | +0.3 | Q |
| 3 | 27 | Fabio Pasini | Italy | 3:31.1 | +0.6 | LL |
| 4 | 14 | Matias Strandvall | Finland | 3:31.9 | +1.4 | |
| 5 | 7 | Andrew Newell | United States | 3:32.0 | +1.5 | |
| 6 | 17 | Gianluca Cologna | Switzerland | 3:33.5 | +3.0 | |

=== Quarterfinal 3 ===
| Rank | Seed | Athlete | Country | Time | Deficit | Note |
|---|---|---|---|---|---|---|
| 1 | 26 | Alex Harvey | Canada | 3:30.5 | | Q |
| 2 | 6 | Ola Vigen Hattestad | Norway | 3:31.2 | +0.7 | Q |
| 3 | 5 | Dmitriy Yaparov | Russia | 3:31.3 | +0.8 | |
| 4 | 16 | Cyril Miranda | France | 3:31.7 | +1.2 | |
| 5 | 15 | Mikhail Devyatyarov, Jr. | Russia | 3:33.5 | +3.0 | |
| 6 | 25 | Tim Tscharnke | Germany | 3:34.3 | +3.8 | |

=== Quarterfinal 4 ===
| Rank | Seed | Athlete | Country | Time | Deficit | Note |
|---|---|---|---|---|---|---|
| 1 | 2 | Alexey Poltoranin | Kazakhstan | 3:30.6 | | Q |
| 2 | 9 | Calle Halfvarsson | Sweden | 3:31.3 | +0.7 | Q |
| 3 | 19 | Teodor Peterson | Sweden | 3:33.0 | +2.4 | |
| 4 | 29 | Jens Eriksson | Sweden | 3:33.4 | +2.8 | |
| 5 | 22 | Hiroyuki Miyazawa | Japan | 3:34.7 | +4.1 | |
| 6 | 12 | Alexander Panzhinskiy | Russia | 3:35.6 | +5.0 | |

=== Quarterfinal 5 ===
| Rank | Seed | Athlete | Country | Time | Deficit | Note |
|---|---|---|---|---|---|---|
| 1 | 8 | Eirik Brandsdal | Norway | 3:29.3 | | Q |
| 2 | 13 | Petter Northug | Norway | 3:29.9 | +0.6 | Q |
| 3 | 23 | Federico Pellegrino | Italy | 3:30.4 | +1.1 | LL |
| 4 | 3 | Anssi Pentsinen | Finland | 3:33.8 | +4.5 | |
| 5 | 28 | Jovian Hediger | Switzerland | 3:34.0 | +4.7 | |
| 6 | 18 | Kalle Lassila | Finland | 3:36.4 | +7.1 | |

== Semifinals ==
=== Semifinal 1 ===
| Rank | Seed | Athlete | Country | Time | Deficit | Note |
|---|---|---|---|---|---|---|
| 1 | 1 | Nikita Kryukov | Russia | 3:30.3 | | Q |
| 2 | 4 | Emil Jönsson | Sweden | 3:30.6 | +0.3 | Q |
| 3 | 10 | Pål Golberg | Norway | 3:30.8 | +0.5 | LL |
| 4 | 24 | Toni Ketelä | Finland | 3:33.7 | +3.4 | |
| 5 | 6 | Ola Vigen Hattestad | Norway | 3:37.4 | +7.1 | |
| 6 | 23 | Federico Pellegrino | Italy | 3:43.6 | +13.3 | |

=== Semifinal 2 ===
| Rank | Seed | Athlete | Country | Time | Deficit | Note |
|---|---|---|---|---|---|---|
| 1 | 13 | Petter Northug | Norway | 3:31.1 | | Q |
| 2 | 8 | Eirik Brandsdal | Norway | 3:31.1 | +0.0 | Q |
| 3 | 26 | Alex Harvey | Canada | 3:31.2 | +0.1 | LL |
| 4 | 9 | Calle Halfvarsson | Sweden | 3:31.8 | +0.7 | |
| 5 | 27 | Fabio Pasini | Italy | 3:31.9 | +0.8 | |
| 6 | 2 | Alexey Poltoranin | Kazakhstan | 4:08.6 | +37.5 | |

== Finals ==
The final races were held from 13:12 to 14:25.

| Rank | Seed | Athlete | Country | Time | Deficit | Note |
|---|---|---|---|---|---|---|
| 1st place, gold medalist(s) | 1 | Nikita Kryukov | Russia | 3:30.4 | | |
| 2nd place, silver medalist(s) | 13 | Petter Northug | Norway | 3:30.8 | +0.4 | |
| 3rd place, bronze medalist(s) | 26 | Alex Harvey | Canada | 3:31.2 | +0.8 | |
| 4 | 4 | Emil Jönsson | Sweden | 3:33.0 | +2.6 | |
| 5 | 10 | Pål Golberg | Norway | 3:39.6 | +9.2 | |
| 6 | 8 | Eirik Brandsdal | Norway | 3:57.5 | +27.1 | |
