= Andrew Newell (skier) =

American cross-country skier

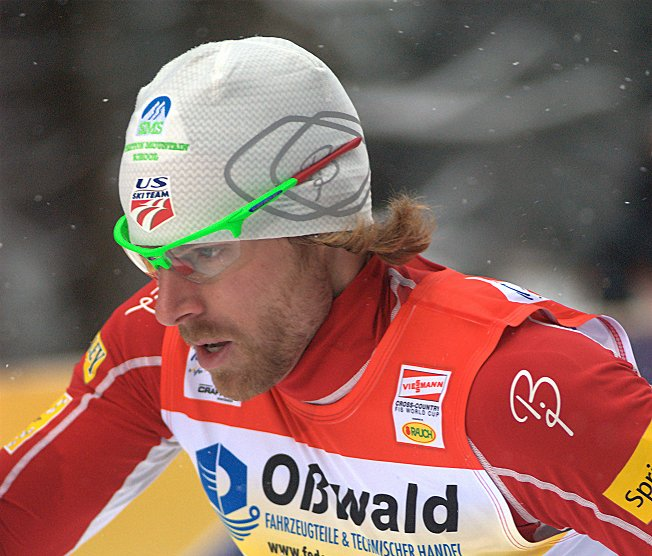

Personal information
- Nationality: United States
- Born: November 30, 1983 (age 42) Bennington, Vermont, United States

Sport
- Sport: Skiing
- Club: Stratton Mountain School

World Cup career
- Seasons: 17 – (2004–2020)
- Indiv. starts: 220
- Indiv. podiums: 3
- Indiv. wins: 0
- Team starts: 36
- Team podiums: 0
- Overall titles: 0 – (19th in 2010)
- Discipline titles: 0
- Updated on 18 November 2021

Andrew "Andy" Newell (born November 30, 1983) is an American former cross-country skier. He began competing on international level in 2001 and debuted in the World Cup in the 2003–04 season. In 2020 Newell launched is online coaching platform Nordic Team Solutions. He is currently the Bridger Ski Foundation Pro Team coach in Bozeman, Montana

== Career ==
His best individual finish at the FIS Nordic World Ski Championships was fifth in the sprint at the 2007 championships in Sapporo. Newell's best individual finish at the Winter Olympics was 16th in the sprint at Turin in 2006. In March, 2006, Newell reached a third place in a World Cup sprint race in Changchun, China. This podium position was the first in just over 20 years for an American Nordic skier. Newell has a total of twenty one individual sprint victories at various levels since 2001, including his first national championship in January, 2007, at Houghton, MI.

Results in 2007–08 season include: 2008 US National Sprint Champion, 4th place World Cup Kuusamo Finland, 2nd place World Cup Lahti Finland.

Andrew Newell was born in Shaftsbury, Vermont. He attended the Stratton Mountain School for several years, where his career as a ski racer began to flourish. After completing his high school degree and some post-grad work at Stratton, Newell went on to join the US Ski Team, which he still competes for today.

He also does cinematography as a hobby, and is the owner of a film company called 'X Ski Films.' Newell is known as one of the most talented persons on cross-country skis, as he demonstrates as a star in his own films. Among Newell's most noteworthy accomplishments in the XSki world are huge backflips on his skinny skis, 720's, and a radar-clocking (by the Vermont State Police) of over 50 mph.

It was announced on January 19, 2010, that Newell had qualified for the 2010 Winter Olympics where he earned his best finish of ninth in the team sprint.

He is represented by Ken Sowles Athletes Management and Sport Promotion.

In 2013 Newell founded the Organization Athletes For Action, an Environmental organization focused on using professional athletes to bring attention to climate change. Some of his climate change op-eds were featured in The New York Times and USA Today. Newell also works with the environmental organization Protect Our Winters and regularly speaks on behalf of sustainable practices and urging world leaders to politically take action against climate change.

Newell retired after the 2019–20 season.

== Cross-country skiing results ==
All results are sourced from the International Ski Federation (FIS).

=== Olympic Games ===
Year	Age	15 km	30 km	50 km	Sprint	4 × 10 km relay	Team sprint
2006	22	—	—	—	16	—	13
2010	26	—	—	—	45	13	9
2014	30	—	—	—	18	11	—
2018	34	—	—	—	37	14	—

=== World Championships ===
Year	Age	15 km	Pursuit	30 km	50 km	Sprint	4 × 10 km relay	Team sprint
2003	19	—	—	—	—	31	—	—N/a
2005	21	—	—	—N/a	—	12	—	14
2007	23	—	—	—N/a	—	5	—	13
2009	25	—	—	—N/a	—	12	12	—
2011	27	—	—	—N/a	—	10	14	10
2013	29	—	—	—N/a	—	21	10	14
2015	31	—	—	—N/a	—	17	—	7
2017	33	50	—	—N/a	—	21	—	—
2019	35	—	—	—N/a	—	40	—	—

=== World Cup ===
==== Season standings ====
Season	Age	Discipline standings			Ski Tour standings				
Season	Age	Overall	Distance	Sprint	Nordic Opening	Tour de Ski	Ski Tour 2020	World Cup Final	Ski Tour Canada
2004	20	102	—	53	—N/a	—N/a	—N/a	—N/a	—N/a
2005	21	NC	—	NC	—N/a	—N/a	—N/a	—N/a	—N/a
2006	22	25	NC	8	—N/a	—N/a	—N/a	—N/a	—N/a
2007	23	35	—	6	—N/a	—	—N/a	—N/a	—N/a
2008	24	36	NC	10	—N/a	—	—N/a	—	—N/a
2009	25	47	NC	15	—N/a	—	—N/a	DNF	—N/a
2010	26	19	NC	4	—N/a	DNF	—N/a	40	—N/a
2011	27	36	74	8	DNF	DNF	—N/a	DNF	—N/a
2012	28	42	85	16	72	DNF	—N/a	32	—N/a
2013	29	29	70	5	DNF	DNF	—N/a	38	—N/a
2014	30	39	83	15	87	DNF	—N/a	DNF	—N/a
2015	31	54	NC	18	DNF	DNF	—N/a	—N/a	—N/a
2016	32	62	NC	27	DNF	DNF	—N/a	—N/a	DNF
2017	33	66	NC	28	DNF	—	—N/a	44	—N/a
2018	34	86	NC	40	75	DNF	—N/a	DNF	—N/a
2019	35	99	NC	51	—	—	—N/a	DNF	—N/a
2020	36	NC	—	NC	—	—	–	—N/a	—N/a

==== Individual podiums ====
- 3 podiums – (3 WC)

No.	Season	Date	Location	Race	Level	Place
1	2005–06	15 March 2006	Changchun, China	1.0 km Sprint F	World Cup	3rd
2	2007–08	3 March 2008	Lahti, Finland	1.4 km Sprint F	World Cup	2nd
3	2009–10	11 March 2010	Drammen, Norway	1.2 km Sprint C	World Cup	3rd
