= Fulvio Scola =

Italian cross-country skier (born 1982)

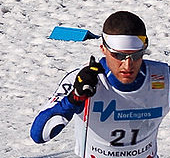

Personal information
- Nationality: Italy
- Born: 10 December 1982 (age 43) Agordo, Italy

Sport
- Sport: Skiing
- Club: G.S. Fiamme Gialle

World Cup career
- Seasons: 11 – (2004–2014)
- Indiv. starts: 89
- Indiv. podiums: 1
- Indiv. wins: 0
- Team starts: 16
- Team podiums: 1
- Team wins: 0
- Overall titles: 0 – (24th in 2011)
- Discipline titles: 0
Medal record
Men's cross-country skiing
Representing Italy
U23 World Championships
Silver medal – second place	2004 Soldier Hollow	Team sprint
- Updated on 16 April 2019

Fulvio Scola (born 10 December 1982) is an Italian cross-country skier who has competed since 2001. His best finish at the FIS Nordic World Ski Championships was eighth in the individual sprint event at Liberec in 2009.

Scola's best World Cup finish was 12th in the 15 km event in Otepää, Estonia in 2007. He has two career victories in the Alpen Cup, both in sprint events, with one in 2008 and one in 2009.

== Cross-country skiing results ==
All results are sourced from the International Ski Federation (FIS).

=== World Championships ===
Year	Age	15 km individual	30 km skiathlon	50 km mass start	Sprint	4 × 10 km relay	Team sprint
2009	26	—	—	—	8	—	13
2011	28	41	—	—	43	—	—
2013	30	—	—	—	36	—	—

=== World Cup ===
==== Season standings ====
Season	Age	Discipline standings			Ski Tour standings		
Season	Age	Overall	Distance	Sprint	Nordic Opening	Tour de Ski	World Cup Final
2004	21	NC	—	NC	—N/a	—N/a	—N/a
2005	22	NC	—	NC	—N/a	—N/a	—N/a
2006	23	NC	NC	—	—N/a	—N/a	—N/a
2007	24	103	61	NC	—N/a	46	—N/a
2008	25	151	89	NC	—N/a	—	—
2009	26	79	78	43	—N/a	—	40
2010	27	NC	NC	NC	—N/a	—	—
2011	28	24	94	5	38	DNF	31
2012	29	106	NC	54	76	DNF	—
2013	30	115	NC	65	—	DNF	—
2014	31	164	NC	104	—	—	—

==== Individual podiums ====
- 1 podium – (1 WC)

No.	Season	Date	Location	Race	Level	Place
1	2010–11	4 December 2010	Düsseldorf, Germany	1.7 km Sprint F	World Cup	2nd

==== Team podiums ====
- 1 podium – (1 TS)

No.	Season	Date	Location	Race	Level	Place	Teammate
1	2011–12	15 January 2012	Milan, Italy	6 × 1.4 km Team Sprint	World Cup	3rd	Hofer
