= Marcus Hellner =

Swedish cross-country skier

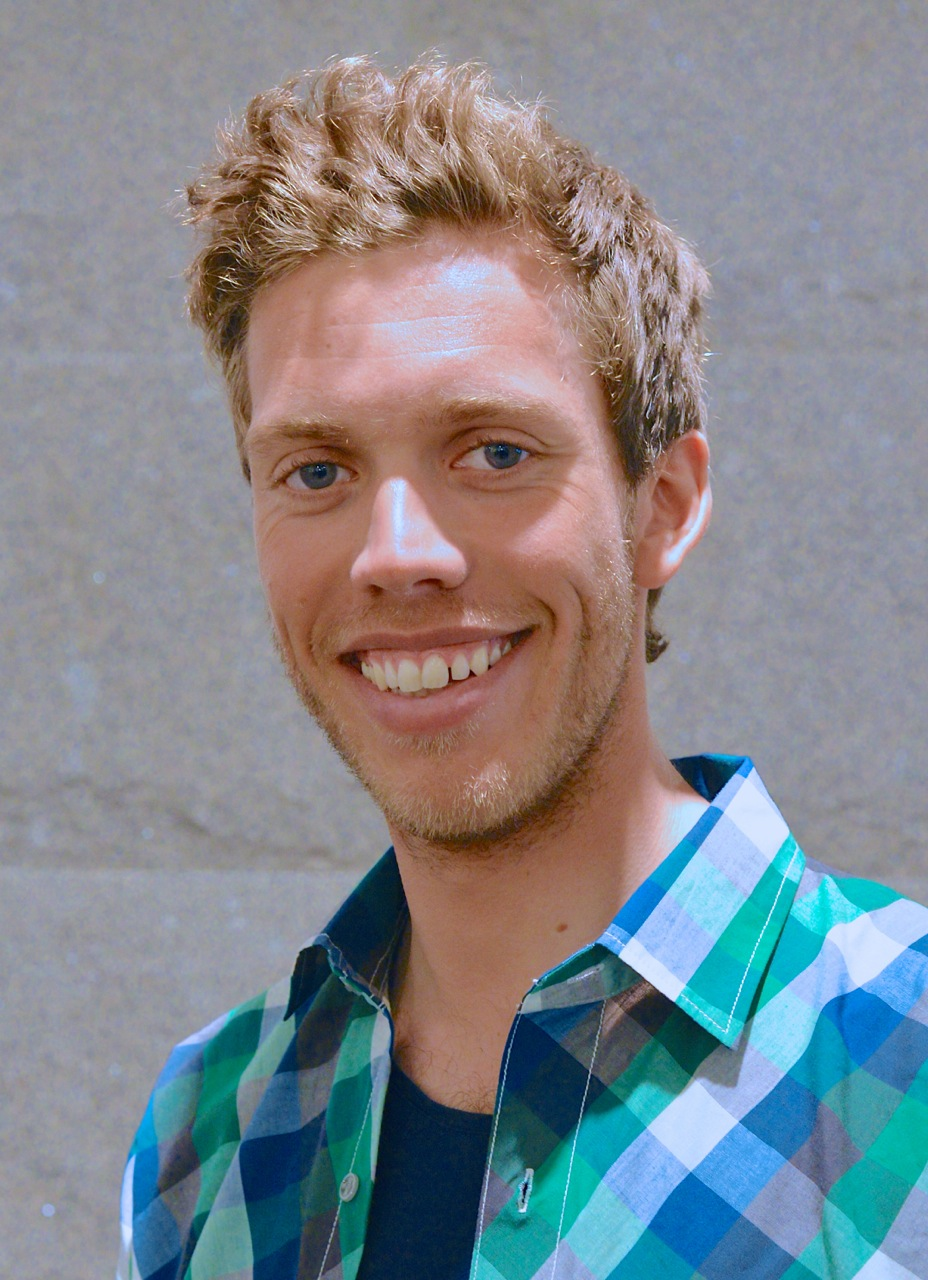

Personal information
- Nationality: Sweden
- Born: 25 November 1985 (age 40) Lerdala, Sweden
- Height: 1.83 m (6 ft 0 in)

Sport
- Sport: Skiing
- Club: Gellivare Skidallians IK

World Cup career
- Seasons: 13 – (2006–2018)
- Indiv. starts: 207
- Indiv. podiums: 26
- Indiv. wins: 5
- Team starts: 19
- Team podiums: 10
- Team wins: 1
- Overall titles: 0 – (3rd in 2010)
- Discipline titles: 0
Medal record
Men's cross-country skiing
Representing Sweden
Event	1st	2nd	3rd
Olympic Games	3	1	0
World Championships	1	4	2
Total	4	5	2
Olympic Games
Gold medal – first place	2010 Vancouver	30 km skiathlon
Gold medal – first place	2010 Vancouver	4 × 10 km relay
Gold medal – first place	2014 Sochi	4 × 10 km relay
Silver medal – second place	2014 Sochi	30 km skiathlon
World Championships
Gold medal – first place	2011 Oslo	Individual sprint
Silver medal – second place	2011 Oslo	4 × 10 km relay
Silver medal – second place	2013 Val di Fiemme	Team sprint
Silver medal – second place	2013 Val di Fiemme	4 × 10 km relay
Silver medal – second place	2015 Falun	4 × 10 km relay
Bronze medal – third place	2007 Sapporo	4 × 10 km relay
Bronze medal – third place	2017 Lahti	4 × 10 km relay
U23 World Championships
Silver medal – second place	2007 Tarvisio	Individual sprint
Bronze medal – third place	2006 Kranj	Individual sprint

Carl Marcus Joakim Hellner (born 25 November 1985) is a Swedish former cross-country skier who competed between 2003 and 2018. He retired at the end of the 2017-18 FIS World Cup season.

== Athletic career ==
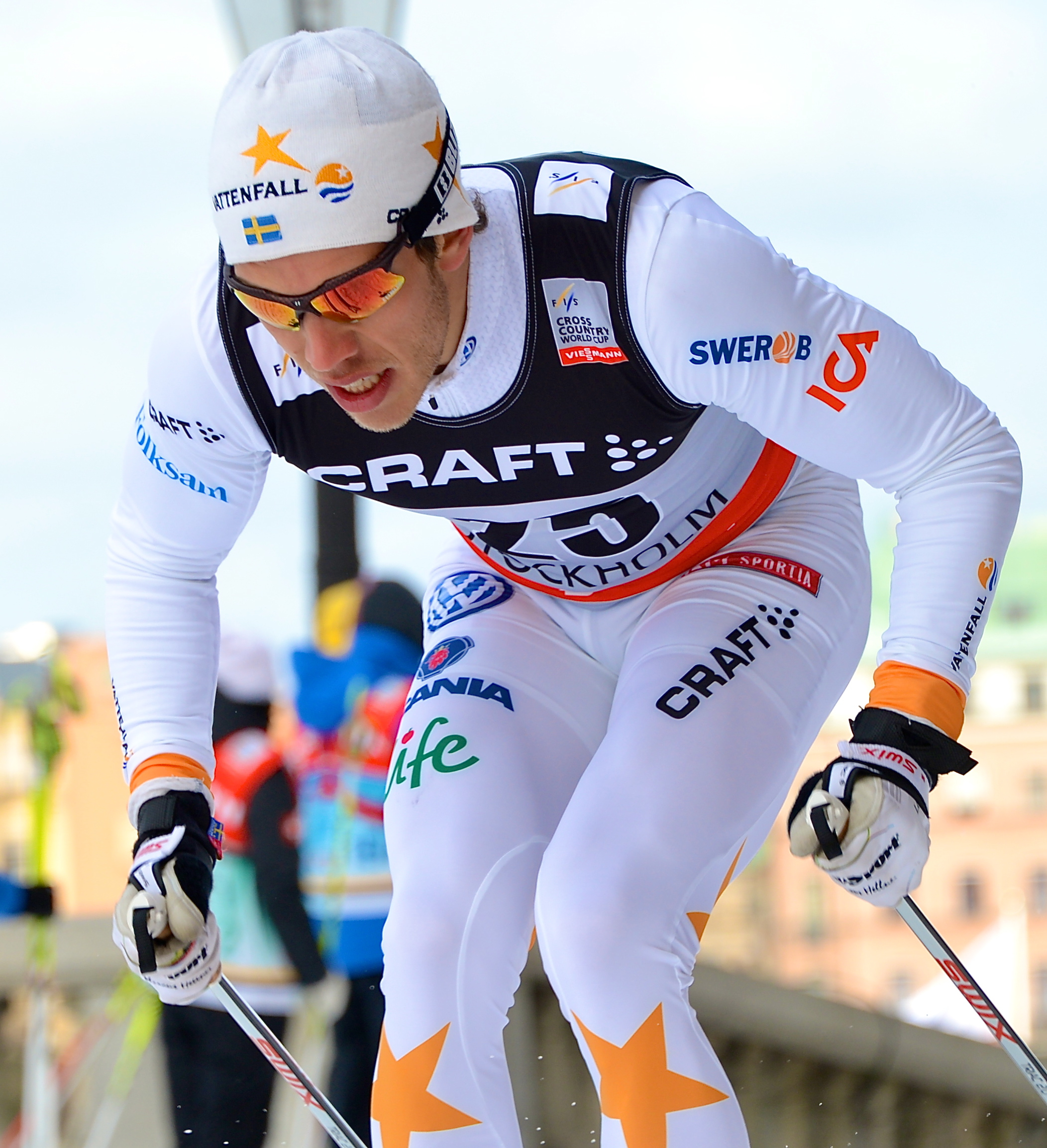
Hellner at the Royal Palace Sprint, Stockholm (2013)

Hellner had a total of seven victories in the junior levels of cross-country skiing up to 30 km from 2003 to 2005. In Gällivare, Sweden, he took his first world cup win on a 15 km event.

Hellner won bronze, his first medal, in the 4 × 10 km relay at the 2007 FIS Nordic World Ski Championships in Sapporo.

In the 2010 Winter Olympics in Vancouver, Hellner won his first Olympic gold medal in the 30 km skiathlon, deciding the race in a sprint at the end. At the 4 × 10 km relay, Hellner took gold for Sweden after leading the race from the very start.

In the 2011 FIS Nordic World Ski Championships in Oslo, Hellner opened his championship with winning a victory in the men's sprint. A couple of days later, Hellner, like in the 2010 Winter Olympics, rode the last lap for Sweden in the 4 × 10 km relay. This time finishing second, winning a silver medal for Sweden.

In the 2012, Hellner became the first Swedish male skier to be on the podium in Tour de Ski by securing a second place overall after passing Petter Northug in the final uphill event.

At the 2014 Winter Olympics Hellner won a silver medal at the 30 km skiathlon and a gold in the men's 4 × 10 km relay, skiing the last leg.

On 6 May 2018, his retirement from cross–country skiing was announced.

== Cross-country skiing results ==
All results are sourced from the International Ski Federation (FIS).

=== Olympic Games ===
- 4 medals – (3 gold, 1 silver)

Year	Age	15 km individual	30 km skiathlon	50 km mass start	Sprint	4 × 10 km relay	Team sprint
2010	24	4	Gold	22	—	Gold	15
2014	28	10	Silver	—	6	Gold	—
2018	32	8	12	—	—	5	4

=== World Championships ===
- 7 medals – (1 gold, 4 silver, 2 bronze)

Year	Age	15 km individual	30 km skiathlon	50 km mass start	Sprint	4 × 10 km relay	Team sprint
2007	21	8	—	—	—	Bronze	—
2009	23	—	19	27	5	6	—
2011	25	34	6	15	Gold	Silver	—
2013	27	17	8	29	—	Silver	Silver
2015	29	4	10	—	—	Silver	—
2017	31	—	7	12	—	Bronze	—

=== World Cup ===
==== Season standings ====
Season	Age	Discipline standings			Ski Tour standings			
Season	Age	Overall	Distance	Sprint	Nordic Opening	Tour de Ski	World Cup Final	Ski Tour Canada
2006	20	NC	NC	NC	—N/a	—N/a	—N/a	—N/a
2007	21	114	81	73	—N/a	50	—N/a	—N/a
2008	22	53	45	41	—N/a	36	—	—N/a
2009	23	21	17	35	—N/a	DNF	8	—N/a
2010	24	3rd place, bronze medalist(s)	3rd place, bronze medalist(s)	15	—N/a	4	3rd place, bronze medalist(s)	—N/a
2011	25	7	7	15	4	14	DNF	—N/a
2012	26	4	8	34	6	2nd place, silver medalist(s)	9	—N/a
2013	27	9	11	53	12	5	23	—N/a
2014	28	17	15	82	7	—	6	—N/a
2015	29	19	14	NC	—	11	—N/a	—N/a
2016	30	30	27	64	—	—	—N/a	10
2017	31	6	8	40	6	6	6	—N/a
2018	32	26	22	40	19	DNF	13	—N/a

==== Individual podiums ====
- 5 victories – (2 WC, 3 SWC)
- 26 podiums – (10 WC, 16 SWC)

No.	Season	Date	Location	Race	Level	Place
1	2008–09	22 November 2008	Gällivare, Sweden	15 km Individual F	World Cup	1st
2	2008–09	21 March 2009	Falun, Sweden	10 km + 10 km Pursuit C/F	Stage World Cup	2nd
3	2009–10	12 December 2009	Davos, Switzerland	15 km Individual F	World Cup	2nd
4	2009–10	1 January 2010	Oberhof, Germany	3.7 km Individual F	Stage World Cup	2nd
5	2009–10	4 January 2010	Prague, Czech Republic	1.2 km Sprint F	Stage World Cup	2nd
6	2009–10	6 January 2010	Cortina-Toblach, Italy	35 km Pursuit F	Stage World Cup	3rd
7	2009–10	10 January 2010	Val di Fiemme, Italy	10 km Pursuit F	Stage World Cup	2nd
8	2009–10	14 March 2010	Oslo, Norway	1.0 km Sprint F	World Cup	3rd
9	2009–10	21 March 2010	(Sweden) World Cup Final	Overall Standings	World Cup	3rd
10	2010–11	20 November 2010	Gällivare, Sweden	15 km Individual F	World Cup	1st
11	2010–11	28 November 2010	Rukatunturi, Finland	15 km Pursuit F	Stage World Cup	3rd
12	2010–11	31 December 2010	Oberhof, Germany	3.75 km Individual F	Stage World Cup	1st
13	2010–11	6 January 2011	Cortina-Toblach, Italy	35 km Pursuit F	Stage World Cup	2nd
14	2011–12	8 January 2012	Val di Fiemme, Italy	9 km Pursuit F	Stage World Cup	3rd
15	2011–12	29 December 2011 – 8 January 2012	(Germany) (Italy) Tour de Ski	Overall Standings	World Cup	2nd
16	2012–13	24 November 2012	Gällivare, Sweden	15 km Individual F	World Cup	3rd
17	2012–13	29 December 2012	Oberhof, Germany	4 km Individual F	Stage World Cup	2nd
18	2012–13	6 January 2013	Val di Fiemme, Italy	9 km Pursuit F	Stage World Cup	1st
19	2013–14	1 December 2013	Rukatunturi, Finland	15 km Pursuit F	Stage World Cup	3rd
20	2013–14	1 February 2014	Toblach, Italy	15 km Individual C	World Cup	3rd
21	2013–14	16 March 2014	Falun, Sweden	15 km Pursuit F	Stage World Cup	2nd
22	2014–15	15 February 2015	Östersund, Sweden	15 km Individual F	World Cup	3rd
23	2015–16	11 March 2016	Canmore, Canada	15 km Individual F	Stage World Cup	3rd
24	2016–17	3 December 2016	Lillehammer, Norway	10 km Individual F	Stage World Cup	2nd
25	2016–17	21 January 2017	Ulricehamn, Sweden	15 km Individual F	World Cup	3rd
26	2016–17	19 March 2017	Quebec City, Canada	15 km Pursuit F	Stage World Cup	1st

==== Team podiums ====
- 1 victory – (1 RL)
- 10 podiums – (9 RL, 1 TS)

No.	Season	Date	Location	Race	Level	Place	Teammate(s)
1	2007–08	28 October 2007	Düsseldorf, Germany	6 × 1.5 km Team Sprint F	World Cup	3rd	Jönsson
2	2007–08	9 December 2007	Davos, Switzerland	4 × 10 km Relay C/F	World Cup	3rd	Larsson / Olsson / Södergren
3	2008–09	23 November 2008	Gällivare, Sweden	4 × 10 km Relay C/F	World Cup	2nd	Rickardsson / Olsson / Andreasson
4	2008–09	7 December 2008	La Clusaz, France	4 × 10 km Relay C/F	World Cup	2nd	Rickardsson / Olsson / Södergren
5	2010–11	21 November 2010	Gällivare, Sweden	4 × 10 km Relay C/F	World Cup	1st	Larsson / Olsson / Rickardsson
6	2011–12	20 November 2011	Sjusjøen, Norway	4 × 10 km Relay C/F	World Cup	3rd	Rickardsson / Olsson / Halfvarsson
7	2011–12	12 February 2012	Nové Město, Czech Republic	4 × 10 km Relay C/F	World Cup	2nd	Rickardsson / Olsson / Södergren
8	2012–13	25 November 2012	Gällivare, Sweden	4 × 7.5 km Relay C/F	World Cup	2nd	Jönsson / Olsson / Rickardsson
9	2012–13	20 January 2013	La Clusaz, France	4 × 7.5 km Relay C/F	World Cup	2nd	Rickardsson / Olsson / Halfvarsson
10	2016–17	21 January 2017	Ulricehamn, Sweden	4 × 7.5 km Relay C/F	World Cup	2nd	Rickardsson / Olsson / Halfvarsson

== Personal life ==
Hellner participated in the 2010 World Series of Poker main event. In March 2012, Hellner joined Team Pokerstars SportsStars alongside Mats Sundin and Boris Becker.
