= Ola Vigen Hattestad =

Norwegian cross-country skier

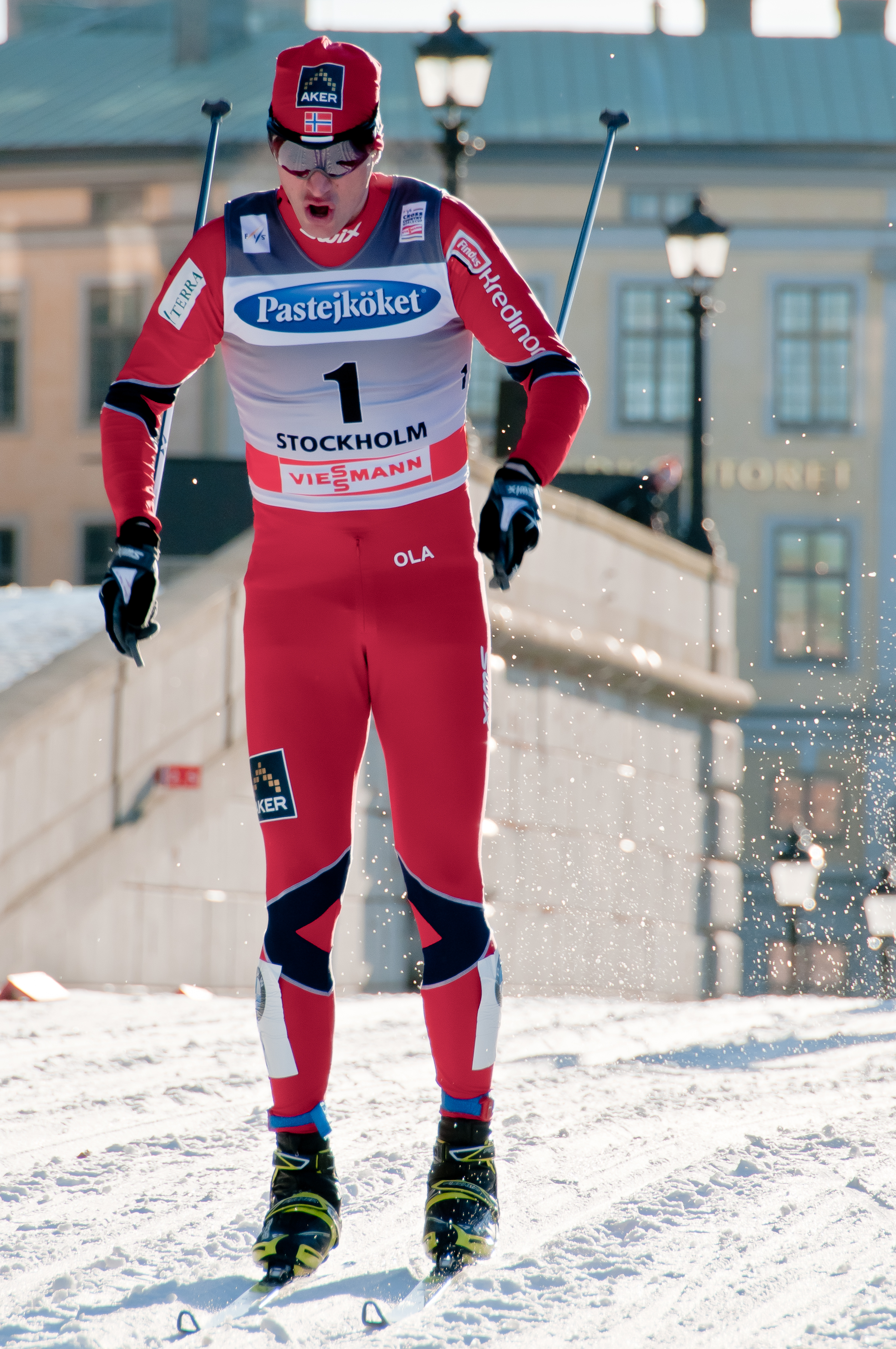

Personal information
- Nationality: Norway
- Born: 19 April 1982 (age 44) Askim, Østfold, Norway
- Spouse: Katja Višnar

Sport
- Sport: Skiing
- Club: Ørje IL

World Cup career
- Seasons: 15 – (2003–2017)
- Indiv. starts: 117
- Indiv. podiums: 32
- Indiv. wins: 13
- Team starts: 10
- Team podiums: 6
- Team wins: 4
- Overall titles: 0 – (3rd in 2009)
- Discipline titles: 3 – (3 SP)
Medal record
Men's cross-country skiing
Representing Norway
Event	1st	2nd	3rd
Olympic Games	1	0	0
World Championships	2	1	1
Total	3	1	1
Olympic Games
Gold medal – first place	2014 Sochi	Individual sprint
World Championships
Gold medal – first place	2009 Liberec	Individual sprint
Gold medal – first place	2009 Liberec	Team sprint
Silver medal – second place	2011 Holmenkollen	Team sprint
Bronze medal – third place	2015 Falun	Individual sprint

Ola Vigen Hattestad (born 19 April 1982) is a former Norwegian cross-country skier who competed from 2002 through 2018. Competing in three Winter Olympics, he became Olympic champion in the individual sprint event at Sochi in 2014.

== Career ==
Hattestad has 13 individual World Cup victories, all in the sprint events. He also won the 2007–08, 2008–09 and 2013–14 World Cup in the sprint discipline and finished third in the overall 2008–2009 world cup.

Hattestad won two gold medals at the 2009 World Championships, earning them in the individual and team sprint events. Having ranked sixth in the qualifying round, Hattestad progressed through the quarterfinals and semifinals by winning each round, eventually taking the title ahead of fellow Norwegian Johan Kjølstad. The subsequent day, the two of them teamed up for the team sprint and won another gold medal.

He was initially not qualified for the Norwegian team for the 2014 Winter Olympics, but this changed before the opening individual sprint, where he emerged victorious after the fastest prologue, and winning the quarterfinal, semifinal and final.

On 3 May 2018, he announced his retirement from cross-country skiing.

== Cross-country skiing results ==
All results are sourced from the International Ski Federation (FIS).

=== Olympic Games ===
- 1 medal – (1 gold)

Year	Age	15 km individual	30 km skiathlon	50 km mass start	Sprint	4 × 10 km relay	Team sprint
2006	23	—	—	—	9	—	—
2010	27	—	—	—	4	—	—
2014	31	—	—	—	Gold	—	4

=== World Championships ===
- 4 medals – (2 gold, 1 silver, 1 bronze)

Year	Age	15 km individual	30 km skiathlon	50 km mass start	Sprint	4 × 10 km relay	Team sprint
2009	26	—	—	—	Gold	—	Gold
2011	28	—	—	—	4	—	Silver
2013	30	—	—	—	9	—	—
2015	32	—	—	—	Bronze	—	—

=== World Cup ===
==== Season titles ====
- 3 titles – (3 sprint)

Season
Season	Discipline
2008	Sprint
2009	Sprint
2014	Sprint

==== Season standings ====
Season	Age	Discipline standings			Ski Tour standings			
Season	Age	Overall	Distance	Sprint	Nordic Opening	Tour de Ski	World Cup Final	Ski Tour Canada
2003	20	NC	—N/a	NC	—N/a	—N/a	—N/a	—N/a
2004	21	NC	—	NC	—N/a	—N/a	—N/a	—N/a
2005	22	28	—	9	—N/a	—N/a	—N/a	—N/a
2006	23	42	—	16	—N/a	—N/a	—N/a	—N/a
2007	24	30	—	9	—N/a	—	—N/a	—N/a
2008	25	14	NC	1st place, gold medalist(s)	—N/a	—	DNF	—N/a
2009	26	3rd place, bronze medalist(s)	NC	1st place, gold medalist(s)	—N/a	—	69	—N/a
2010	27	20	NC	5	—N/a	—	DNF	—N/a
2011	28	18	NC	2nd place, silver medalist(s)	DNF	—	DNF	—N/a
2012	29	21	NC	5	DNF	DNF	38	—N/a
2013	30	51	—	16	—	—	—	—N/a
2014	31	15	86	1st place, gold medalist(s)	49	—	35	—N/a
2015	32	33	—	9	DNF	—	—N/a	—N/a
2016	33	26	72	7	—	—	—N/a	DNF
2017	34	98	—	46	—	—	—	—N/a

==== Individual podiums ====
- 13 victories – (13 WC)
- 32 podiums – (31 WC, 1 SWC)

No.	Season	Date	Location	Race	Level	Place
1	2004–05	16 March 2005	Gothenburg, Sweden	1.1 km Sprint F	World Cup	3rd
2	2005–06	11 December 2005	Vernon, Canada	1.3 km Sprint F	World Cup	3rd
3	2006–07	15 February 2007	Changchun, China	1.3 km Sprint C	World Cup	1st
4	2007–08	16 December 2007	Rybinsk, Russia	1.2 km Sprint F	World Cup	2nd
5	2007–08	23 January 2008	Canmore, Canada	1.2 km Sprint C	World Cup	2nd
6	2007–08	10 February 2008	Otepää, Estonia	1.4 km Sprint C	World Cup	3rd
7	2007–08	1 March 2008	Lahti, Finland	1.4 km Sprint F	World Cup	3rd
8	2007–08	5 March 2008	Drammen, Norway	1.2 km Sprint C	World Cup	1st
9	2008–09	29 November 2008	Rukatunturi, Finland	1.4 km Sprint C	World Cup	1st
10	2008–09	14 December 2008	Davos, Switzerland	1.7 km Sprint F	World Cup	1st
11	2008–09	20 December 2008	Düsseldorf, Germany	1.5 km Sprint F	World Cup	1st
12	2008–09	16 January 2009	Whistler, Canada	1.6 km Sprint C	World Cup	2nd
13	2008–09	25 January 2009	Otepää, Estonia	1.4 km Sprint C	World Cup	1st
14	2008–09	13 February 2009	Valdidentro, Italy	1.7 km Sprint F	World Cup	1st
15	2008–09	7 March 2009	Lahti, Finland	1.5 km Sprint F	World Cup	2nd
16	2008–09	12 March 2009	(Norway) Trondheim, Norge	1.6 km Sprint C	World Cup	1st
17	2009–10	28 November 2009	Rukatunturi, Finland	1.4 km Sprint C	World Cup	1st
18	2009–10	17 January 2010	Otepää, Estonia	1.4 km Sprint C	World Cup	2nd
19	2010–11	15 January 2011	Liberec, Czech Republic	1.6 km Sprint F	World Cup	1st
20	2010–11	23 January 2011	Otepää, Estonia	1.4 km Sprint C	World Cup	2nd
21	2010–11	5 February 2011	Rybinsk, Russia	1.3 km Sprint F	World Cup	2nd
22	2010–11	16 March 2011	Stockholm, Sweden	1.0 km Sprint C	Stage World Cup	3rd
23	2011–12	3 December 2011	Düsseldorf, Germany	1.7 km Sprint F	World Cup	1st
24	2011–12	21 January 2012	Otepää, Estonia	1.4 km Sprint C	World Cup	2nd
25	2011–12	17 February 2012	Szklarska Poręba, Poland	1.6 km Sprint F	World Cup	3rd
26	2012–13	9 March 2013	Lahti, Finland	1.2 km Sprint F	World Cup	2nd
27	2013–14	2 February 2014	Toblach, Italy	1.3 km Sprint F	World Cup	1st
28	2013–14	5 March 2014	Drammen, Norway	1.3 km Sprint C	World Cup	1st
29	2014–15	17 January 2015	Otepää, Estonia	1.5 km Sprint C	World Cup	2nd
30	2014–15	11 March 2015	Drammen, Norway	1.3 km Sprint C	World Cup	3rd
31	2015–16	3 February 2016	Drammen, Norway	1.2 km Sprint C	World Cup	2nd
32	2015–16	11 February 2016	Stockholm, Sweden	1.2 km Sprint C	World Cup	2nd

==== Team podiums ====
- 4 victories – (4 TS)
- 6 podiums – (6 TS)

No.	Season	Date	Location	Race	Level	Place	Teammate
1	2008–09	21 December 2008	Düsseldorf, Germany	6 × 1.5 km Team Sprint F	World Cup	1st	Hetland
2	2010–11	5 December 2010	Düsseldorf, Germany	6 × 1.6 km Team Sprint F	World Cup	1st	Gløersen
3	2010–11	16 January 2011	Liberec, Czech Republic	6 × 1.6 km Team Sprint C	World Cup	1st	Kjølstad
4	2011–12	4 December 2011	Düsseldorf, Germany	6 × 1.7 km Team Sprint F	World Cup	3rd	Golberg
5	2013–14	22 December 2013	Asiago, Italy	6 × 1.6 km Team Sprint F	World Cup	1st	Rønning
6	2013–14	12 January 2014	Nové Město, Czech Republic	6 × 1.6 km Team Sprint C	World Cup	3rd	Golberg
