= FIS Nordic World Ski Championships 2009 – Men's sprint =

Men's sprint at the FIS Nordic World Ski Championships 2009
- Venue: Liberec
- Date: 24 February 2009
- Competitors: 135

Medalists
gold medal	Ola Vigen Hattestad	Norway
silver medal	Johan Kjølstad	Norway
bronze medal	Nikolay Morilov	Russia

The men's sprint cross-country skiing competition at the FIS Nordic World Ski Championships 2009 was held on 24 February 2009. The sprint qualifying began at 11:35 CET with finals at 13:30 CET. The defending world champion was Norway's Jens Arne Svartedal, but he was eliminated in the quarterfinals at these championships. It was the first individual medal for all three finishers.

== Results ==
=== Qualification ===
Rank	Bib	Athlete	Country	Time	Deficit	Note
1	25	Johan Kjølstad	Norway	3:02.05	—	Q
2	30	Andrew Newell	USA	3:03.95	+1.90	Q
3	36	Alexey Petukhov	Russia	3:03.97	+1.92	Q
4	35	Nikolay Morilov	Russia	3:04.30	+2.25	Q
5	26	Emil Jönsson	Sweden	3:04.97	+2.92	Q
6	27	Ola Vigen Hattestad	Norway	3:05.16	+3.11	Q
7	20	Eligius Tambornino	Switzerland	3:05.79	+3.74	Q
8	28	Tor Arne Hetland	Norway	3:06.08	+4.03	Q
9	37	Renato Pasini	Italy	3:06.25	+4.20	Q
10	23	Dario Cologna	Switzerland	3:06.60	+4.55	Q
11	29	Cristian Zorzi	Italy	3:06.70	+4.65	Q
12	19	Matias Strandvall	Finland	3:06.82	+4.77	Q
13	44	Fulvio Scola	Italy	3:06.84	+4.79	Q
14	18	Ales Razym	Czech Republic	3:06.95	+4.90	Q
15	5	Anti Saarepuu	Estonia	3:06.98	+4.93	Q
16	32	Fabio Pasini	Italy	3:07.25	+5.20	Q
17	40	Kalle Lassila	Finland	3:07.54	+5.49	Q
18	34	Marcus Hellner	Sweden	3:07.56	+5.51	Q
19	24	Josef Wenzl	Germany	3:08.10	+6.05	Q
20	39	John Kristian Dahl	Norway	3:08.18	+6.13	Q
21	1	Franz Göring	Germany	3:08.27	+6.22	Q
22	6	Jens Arne Svartedal	Norway	3:08.28	+6.23	Q
23	21	Cyril Miranda	France	3:08.34	+6.29	Q
24	38	Nikolay Chebotko	Kazakhstan	3:08.77	+6.72	Q
25	16	Yuichi Onda	Japan	3:08.79	+6.74	Q
26	10	Peeter Kummel	Estonia	3:09.04	+6.99	Q
27	51	Alex Harvey	Canada	3:09.39	+7.34	Q
28	12	Thobias Fredriksson	Sweden	3:09.67	+7.62	Q
29	31	Vasily Rochev	Russia	3:09.73	+7.68	Q
30	43	Phil Widmer	Canada	3:09.78	+7.73	Q
31	13	Valerio Leccardi	Switzerland	3:09.79	+7.74	
32	47	Tom Reichelt	Germany	3:10.35	+8.30	
33	17	Martti Jylhä	Finland	3:10.61	+8.56	
34	11	Janusz Krezelok	Poland	3:10.95	+8.90	
35	7	Martin Jäger	Switzerland	3:10.97	+8.92	
36	14	Damien Ambrosetti	France	3:11.51	+9.46	
37	46	Chris Cook	USA	3:11.84	+9.79	
38	33	Roddy Darragon	France	3:12.08	+10.03	
39	4	Timo Simonlatser	Estonia	3:12.23	+10.18	
40	50	Leanid Karneyenka	Belarus	3:12.34	+10.29	
41	42	Dusan Kozisek	Czech Republic	3:12.48	+10.43	
42	9	Anton Gafarov	Russia	3:12.57	+10.52	
43	22	Torin Koos	USA	3:12.76	+10.71	
44	53	Garrott Kuzzy	USA	3:13.21	+11.16	
45	3	Alexey Poltoranin	Kazakhstan	3:13.28	+11.23	
46	2	Priit Narusk	Estonia	3:13.63	+11.58	
47	54	Manuel Hirner	Austria	3:13.90	+11.85	
48	48	Sean Crooks	Canada	3:15.14	+13.09	
49	58	Modestas Vaiciulis	Lithuania	3:15.19	+13.14	
50	45	Maciej Kreczmer	Poland	3:15.37	+13.32	
51	77	Vitaly Shtun	Ukraine	3:16.19	+14.14	
52	60	Michal Malak	Slovakia	3:16.43	+14.38	
53	119	Alexander Lasutkin	Belarus	3:16.56	+14.51	
54	8	Harald Wurm	Austria	3:16.80	+14.75	
55	57	Sergey Kuzmenko	Belarus	3:17.05	+15.00	
56	72	Veselin Tzinzov	Bulgaria	3:17.09	+15.04	
57	55	Paul Murray	Australia	3:17.47	+15.42	
58	70	Mark Van Der Ploeg	Australia	3:17.61	+15.56	
59	62	Aleksei Novoselki	Lithuania	3:18.28	+16.23	
60	52	Mantas Strolia	Lithuania	3:18.47	+16.42	
61	41	Björn Lind	Sweden	3:18.59	+16.54	
62	66	Davorin Skvaridlo	Slovakia	3:18.67	+16.62	
63	49	Sergey Cherepanov	Kazakhstan	3:18.72	+16.67	
64	63	Andrew Mock	Australia	3:19.04	+16.99	
65	61	Andrew Musgrave	United Kingdom	3:19.17	+17.12	
66	67	Wenlong Xu	China	3:19.30	+17.25	
67	125	Janis Paipals	Latvia	3:21.00	+18.95	
68	59	Yevgeniy Velichko	Kazakhstan	3:21.07	+19.02	
69	64	Zoltan Tagscherer	Hungary	3:21.49	+19.44	
70	103	Olegs Maluhins	Latvia	3:22.30	+20.25	
71	65	Sebastian Sørensen	Denmark	3:22.31	+20.26	
72	84	Aigars Kalnups	Latvia	3:22.67	+20.62	
73	76	Mikhail Gumenyak	Ukraine	3:22.71	+20.66	
74	68	Nick Grimmer	Australia	3:23.23	+21.18	
75	15	Martin Stockinger	Austria	3:23.40	+21.35	
76	75	Oliver Kraas	South Africa	3:23.77	+21.72	
77	71	Kari Peters	Luxembourg	3:24.17	+22.12	
78	81	Asger Fischer Mølgaard	Denmark	3:26.13	+24.08	
79	80	Paul Constantin Pepene	Romania	3:27.01	+24.96	
80	90	Jun-Gil Lee	South Korea	3:27.24	+25.19	
81	129	Karoly Gombos	Hungary	3:28.94	+26.89	
82	91	Dimitrios Kappas	Greece	3:29.84	+27.79	
83	97	Daniel Kuzmin	Israel	3:30.40	+28.35	
84	131	Victor Pinzaru	Moldova	3:30.42	+28.37	
85	96	Athanassios Barbagiannis	Greece	3:30.90	+28.85	
86	88	Artem Rojin	Kyrgyzstan	3:30.94	+28.89	
87	95	Imre Tagscherer	Hungary	3:31.24	+29.19	
88	82	Arvis Liepins	Latvia	3:31.62	+29.57	
89	89	Omer Yusufuoglu	Turkey	3:31.83	+29.78	
90	94	Lyuben Velichkov	Bulgaria	3:32.66	+30.61	
91	107	Milan Szabo	Hungary	3:32.76	+30.71	
92	93	Hovhannes Sargsyan	Armenia	3:32.94	+30.89	
93	83	Filip Kontak	Croatia	3:33.16	+31.11	
94	87	Ivan Burgov	Bulgaria	3:33.43	+31.38	
95	100	Simon James Platt	United Kingdom	3:33.65	+31.60	
96	92	Alexis Gkounko	Greece	3:33.78	+31.73	
97	74	Lasse Mølgaard	Denmark	3:34.56	+32.51	
98	69	Andrew Young	United Kingdom	3:34.89	+32.84	
99	78	Andrej Buric	Croatia	3:36.31	+34.26	
100	132	Sergiu Balan	Moldova	3:36.44	+34.39	
...	...	...	...	...	...	
132	127	Cesar Baena	Venezuela	6:32.17	+3:30.12	
DNS	56	Lefteris Fafalis	Greece	—	—	
DNS	86	Vicente Vilarrubla	Spain	—	—	
DNS	118	Diego Ruiz	Spain	—	—	

=== Quarterfinals ===
Q - Qualified for next round
PF - Photo Finish
LL - Lucky Loser - qualified for next round due to their times

Quarterfinal 1

Rank	Seed	Athlete	Country	Time	Deficit	Note
1	1	Johan Kjølstad	Norway		—	Q
2	10	Dario Cologna	Switzerland			Q
3	20	John Kristian Dahl	Norway			15th
4	21	Franz Göring	Germany			19th
5	11	Cristian Zorzi	Italy			23rd
6	30	Phil Widmer	Canada			30th

Quarterfinal 2

Rank	Seed	Athlete	Country	Time	Deficit	Note
1	4	Nikolay Morilov	Russia		—	Q
2	14	Ales Razym	Czech Republic			Q
3	24	Nikolay Chebotko	Kazakhstan			16th
4	17	Kalle Lassila	Finland			18th
5	7	Eligius Tambornino	Switzerland			21st
6	27	Alex Harvey	Canada			28th

Quarterfinal 3

Rank	Seed	Athlete	Country	Time	Deficit	Note
1	6	Ola Vigen Hattestad	Norway	3:03.2	—	Q
2	15	Anti Saarepuu	Estonia	3:03.5	+0.3	Q PF
3	5	Emil Jönsson	Sweden	3:03.7	+0.5	13th PF
4	16	Fabio Pasini	Italy	3:04.2	+1.0	17th
5	26	Peeter Kummel	Estonia	3:05.6	+2.4	25th
6	25	Yuichi Onda	Japan	3:05.9	+2.7	27th

Quarterfinal 4

Rank	Seed	Athlete	Country	Time	Deficit	Note
1	2	Andrew Newell	USA	3:04.7	—	Q PF
2	29	Vasily Rochev	Russia	3:04.7	+0.0	Q PF
3	9	Renato Pasini	Italy	3:04.7	+0.0	14th PF
4	22	Jens Arne Svartedal	Norway	3:05.9	+1.2	20th
5	12	Matias Strandvall	Finland	3:06.8	+2.1	24th
6	19	Josef Wenzl	Germany	3:08.0	+3.3	26th

Quarterfinal 5

Rank	Seed	Athlete	Country	Time	Deficit	Note
1	3	Alexey Petukhov	Russia	2:59.6	—	Q
2	18	Marcus Hellner	Sweden	3:00.8	+1.2	Q
3	13	Fulvio Scola	Italy	3:01.5	+1.9	LL
4	23	Cyril Miranda	France	3:01.6	+2.0	LL
5	8	Tor Arne Hetland	Norway	3:01.7	+2.1	22nd
6	28	Thobias Fredriksson	Sweden	3:08.3	+9.7	29th

=== Semifinals ===
Semifinal 1

Rank	Seed	Athlete	Country	Time	Deficit	Note
1	1	Johan Kjølstad	Norway	3:03.7	—	QA
2	4	Nikolay Morilov	Russia	3:04.0	+0.3	QA
3	14	Ales Razym	Czech Republic	3:04.0	+0.3	QA LL
4	10	Dario Cologna	Switzerland	3:05.0	+1.3	QA LL
5	13	Fulvio Scola	Italy	3:27.1	+23.4	QB
6	15	Anti Saarepuu	Estonia	3:28.7	+25.0	QB

Semifinal 2

Rank	Seed	Athlete	Country	Time	Deficit	Note
1	6	Ola Vigen Hattestad	Norway	3:04.1	—	QA
2	18	Marcus Hellner	Sweden	3:04.9	+0.8	QA
3	23	Cyril Miranda	France	3:05.3	+1.2	QB
4	29	Vasily Rochev	Russia	3:05.6	+1.5	QB
5	2	Andrew Newell	USA	3:05.6	+1.5	QB
6	3	Alexey Petukhov	Russia	3:07.6	+3.5	QB

=== Finals ===
Final A

Rank	Seed	Athlete	Country	Time	Deficit	Note
1st place, gold medalist(s)	6	Ola Vigen Hattestad	Norway	3:00.8	—	1st
2nd place, silver medalist(s)	1	Johan Kjølstad	Norway	3:01.2	+0.4	2nd
3rd place, bronze medalist(s)	4	Nikolay Morilov	Russia	3:01.9	+1.1	3rd
4	10	Dario Cologna	Switzerland	3:02.9	+2.1	4th
5	18	Marcus Hellner	Sweden	3:03.1	+2.3	5th
6	14	Ales Razym	Czech Republic	3:03.6	+2.8	6th

Final B

Rank	Seed	Athlete	Country	Time	Deficit	Note
1	15	Anti Saarepuu	Estonia		—	7th
2	13	Fulvio Scola	Italy			8th
3	3	Alexey Petukhov	Russia			9th
4	23	Cyril Miranda	France			10th
5	29	Vasily Rochev	Russia			11th
6	2	Andrew Newell	USA			12th
