= Cyril Miranda =

French cross-country skier (born 1985)

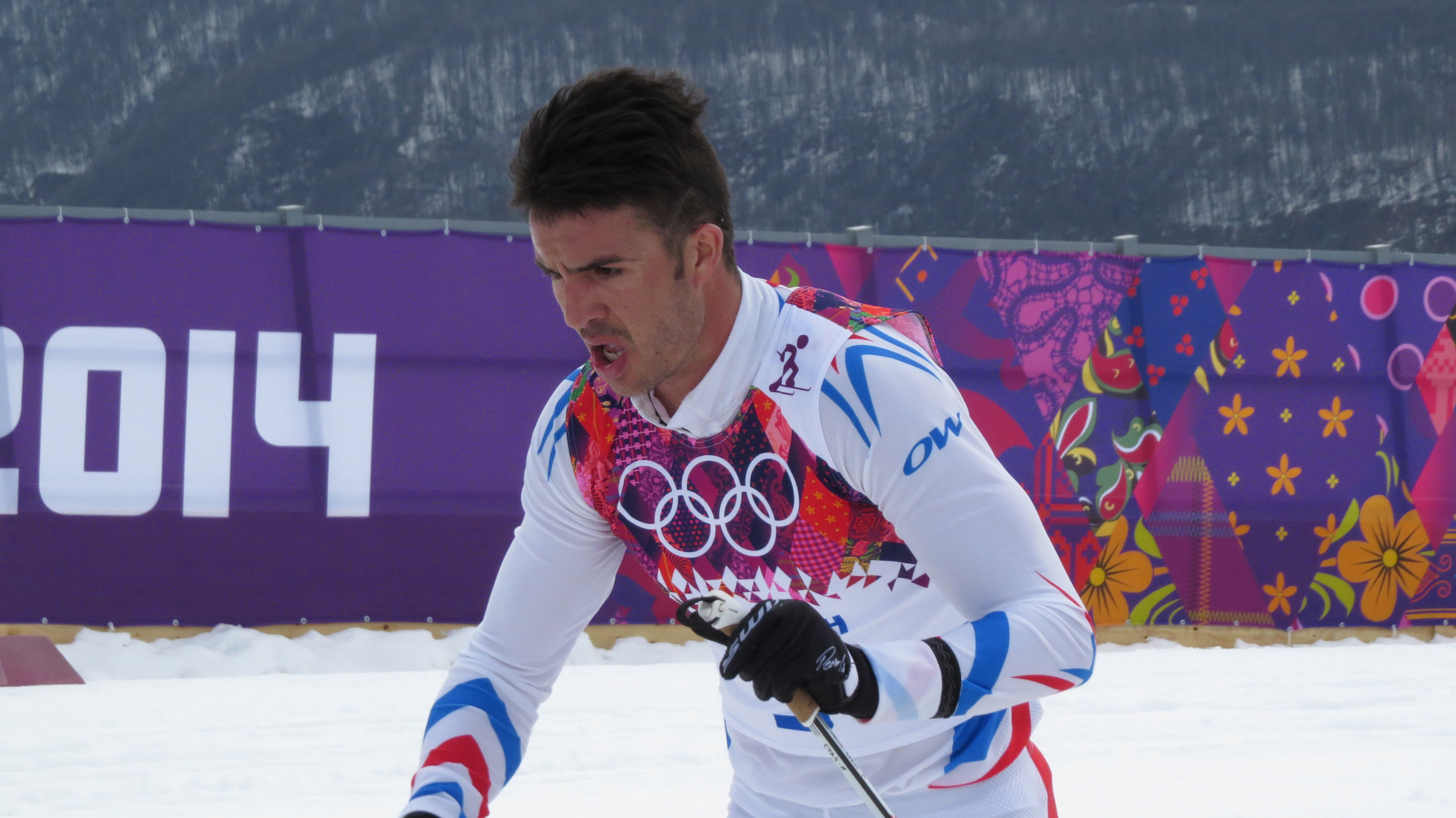
- Miranda at the 2014 Winter Olympics

Personal information
- Nationality: France
- Born: 25 March 1985 (age 41) Le Sentier, Switzerland
- Height: 1.85 m (6 ft 1 in)

Sport
- Sport: Skiing
- Club: SC Bois d'Amont

World Cup career
- Seasons: 9 – (2007–2015)
- Indiv. starts: 100
- Indiv. podiums: 0
- Team starts: 15
- Team podiums: 0
- Overall titles: 0 – (62nd in 2008)
- Discipline titles: 0
Medal record
Men's cross-country skiing
Representing France
U23 World Championships
Silver medal – second place	2008 Mals	Individual sprint
Junior World Championships
Bronze medal – third place	2005 Rovaniemi	4 × 10 km relay

Cyril Miranda (born 25 March 1985) is a retired French cross-country skier who made his World Cup debut in 2007. At the 2010 Winter Olympics in Vancouver, he finished seventh in the team sprint, 16th in the individual sprint, and 38th in the 50 km events.

Miranda's best finish at the FIS Nordic World Ski Championships was fifth in the team sprint event at Liberec in 2009.

His best World Cup finish was fifth twice with one in 2008 in Sweden and the other in 2009 in Canada.

== Cross-country skiing results ==
All results are sourced from the International Ski Federation (FIS).

=== Olympic Games ===
Year	Age	15 km individual	30 km skiathlon	50 km mass start	Sprint	4 × 10 km relay	Team sprint
2010	24	—	—	38	16	—	7
2014	28	56	—	—	16	—	10

=== World Championships ===
Year	Age	15 km individual	30 km skiathlon	50 km mass start	Sprint	4 × 10 km relay	Team sprint
2007	21	—	—	—	12	—	11
2009	23	—	—	—	10	—	5
2011	25	—	—	—	42	—	8
2013	27	—	—	—	18	—	—

=== World Cup ===
==== Season standings ====
Season	Age	Discipline standings			Ski Tour standings		
Season	Age	Overall	Distance	Sprint	Nordic Opening	Tour de Ski	World Cup Final
2007	21	95	88	53	—N/a	—	—N/a
2008	22	62	NC	26	—N/a	—	53
2009	23	64	NC	28	—N/a	45	—
2010	24	72	123	30	—N/a	DNF	—
2011	25	81	72	50	45	DNF	—
2012	26	96	74	81	65	DNF	—
2013	27	147	NC	89	51	DNF	—
2014	28	91	99	46	47	—	—
2015	29	152	—	94	—	—	—N/a
