= Aleš Razým =

Czech cross-country skier (born 1983)

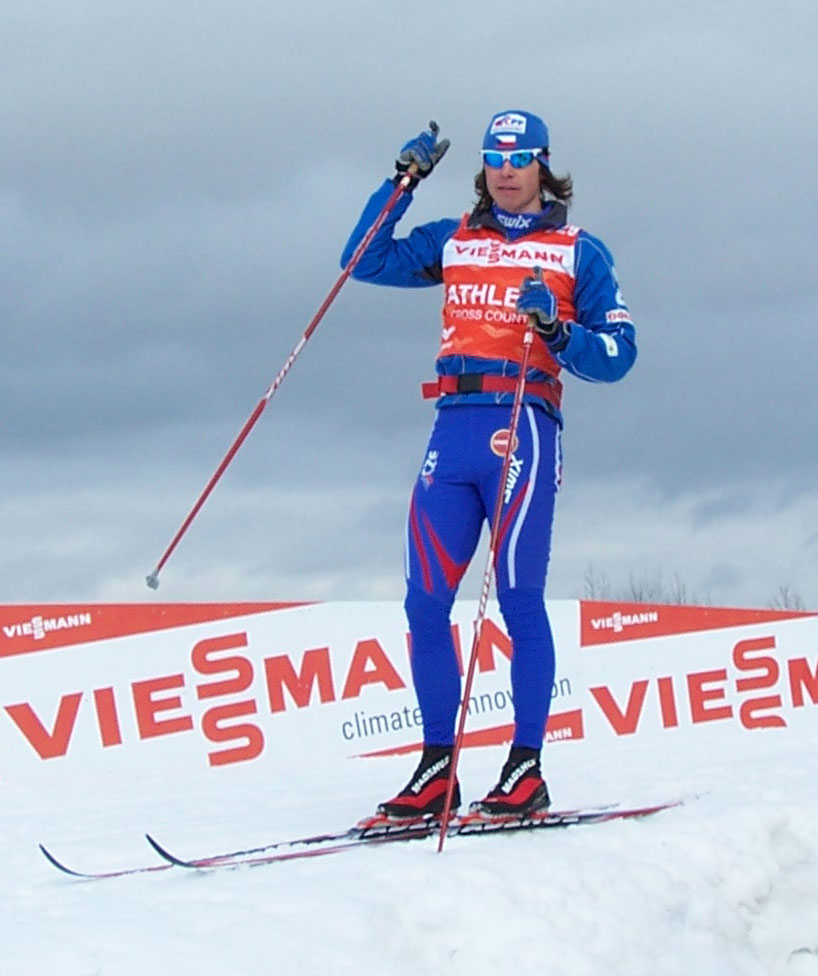
- Aleš Razym in 2009

Personal information
- Nationality: Czech Republic
- Born: 25 April 1983 (age 43) Plzeň, Czechoslovakia

Sport
- Sport: Skiing
- Club: SC Plzeň

World Cup career
- Seasons: 14 – (2005–2018)
- Indiv. starts: 125
- Indiv. podiums: 0
- Team starts: 18
- Team podiums: 1
- Team wins: 0
- Overall titles: 0 – (59th in 2014)
- Discipline titles: 0
Medal record
Men's cross-country skiing
Representing Czech Republic
U23 World Championships
Gold medal – first place	2009 Praz de Lys-Sommand	Individual sprint
Junior World Championships
Bronze medal – third place	2006 Kranj	4 × 5 km relay

Aleš Razým (born 19 August 1986) is a Czech cross-country skier. He has competed since 2004 and finished 44th in the individual sprint event at the 2010 Winter Olympics in Vancouver.

At the FIS Nordic World Ski Championships 2009 in Liberec, Razým finished sixth in the individual sprint and 12th in the team sprint events. He is a student and lives in Chotíkov.

His best World Cup finish was fifth in the team sprint event at Germany in 2007 while his best individual finish was 11th in Switzerland in 2008.

== Cross-country skiing results ==
All results are sourced from the International Ski Federation (FIS).

=== Olympic Games ===
Year	Age	15 km individual	30 km skiathlon	50 km mass start	Sprint	4 × 10 km relay	Team sprint
2010	23	—	—	—	44	—	—
2014	27	—	—	—	49	8	9
2018	31	30	55	41	44	10	7

=== World Championships ===
Year	Age	15 km individual	30 km skiathlon	50 km mass start	Sprint	4 × 10 km relay	Team sprint
2009	22	—	—	—	6	—	12
2013	26	23	—	—	31	11	8
2015	28	—	—	36	48	9	6
2017	30	—	—	48	55	—	12

=== World Cup ===
==== Season standings ====
Season	Age	Discipline standings			Ski Tour standings			
Season	Age	Overall	Distance	Sprint	Nordic Opening	Tour de Ski	World Cup Final	Ski Tour Canada
2005	18	NC	NC	NC	—N/a	—N/a	—N/a	—N/a
2006	19	173	NC	75	—N/a	—N/a	—N/a	—N/a
2007	20	NC	NC	NC	—N/a	DNF	—N/a	—N/a
2008	21	140	NC	95	—N/a	—	—	—N/a
2009	22	78	NC	39	—N/a	40	53	—N/a
2010	23	NC	NC	NC	—N/a	DNF	—	—N/a
2011	24	NC	—	NC	—	—	—	—N/a
2012	25	144	NC	91	—	DNF	—	—N/a
2013	26	67	54	75	39	43	—	—N/a
2014	27	59	58	46	23	35	—	—N/a
2015	28	NC	NC	NC	58	DNF	—N/a	—N/a
2016	29	NC	NC	NC	—	—	—N/a	—
2017	30	NC	NC	NC	59	—	—	—N/a
2018	31	NC	NC	NC	—	36	—	—N/a

==== Team podiums ====
- 1 podium – (1 RL)

No.	Season	Date	Location	Race	Level	Place	Teammates
1	2012–13	20 January 2013	La Clusaz, France	4 × 7.5 km Relay C/F	World Cup	3rd	Magál / Bauer / Jakš
