= FIS Nordic World Ski Championships 2011 – Men's sprint =

Men's sprint at the FIS Nordic World Ski Championships 2011
- Venue: Holmenkollen National Arena
- Date: 24 February 2011
- Competitors: 122 from 43 nations
- Winning time: 3:02.2

Medalists
gold medal	Marcus Hellner	Sweden
silver medal	Petter Northug	Norway
bronze medal	Emil Jönsson	Sweden

The men's sprint was held on 24 February 2011. Sprint qualifying at 13:00 CET with finals at 15:00 CET. The defending world champion was Norway's Ola Vigen Hattestad while the defending Olympic champion was Russia's Nikita Kriukov.

== Results ==
=== Qualification ===
Rank	Bib	Athlete	Country	Time	Deficit	Note
1	36	Jesper Modin	Sweden	2:57.17		Q
2	35	Anders Gløersen	Norway	2:57.41	+0.24	Q
3	15	Martin Jäger	Switzerland	2:57.64	+0.47	Q
4	37	Dario Cologna	Switzerland	2:58.82	+1.65	Q
5	25	Marcus Hellner	Sweden	2:59.20	+2.03	Q
6	21	Eirik Brandsdal	Norway	2:59.49	+2.32	Q
7	24	Ola Vigen Hattestad	Norway	2:59.80	+2.63	Q
8	42	Yuichi Onda	Japan	3:00.20	+3.03	Q
9	16	Alex Harvey	Canada	3:00.46	+3.29	Q
10	17	Petter Northug	Norway	3:00.50	+3.33	Q
11	27	David Hofer	Italy	3:00.91	+3.74	Q
12	31	Emil Jönsson	Sweden	3:01.07	+3.90	Q
13	39	Bernhard Tritscher	Austria	3:01.21	+4.04	Q
14	43	Martti Jylhä	Finland	3:01.66	+4.49	Q
15	23	Federico Pellegrino	Italy	3:02.12	+4.95	Q
16	38	Alexey Petukhov	Russia	3:02.32	+5.15	Q
17	40	Peeter Kümmel	Estonia	3:02.32	+5.15	Q
18	46	Mikhail Devyatyarov, Jr.	Russia	3:02.51	+5.34	Q
19	29	Matias Strandvall	Finland	3:02.85	+5.68	Q
20	10	Martin Koukal	Czech Republic	3:03.01	+5.84	Q
21	44	Len Valjas	Canada	3:03.09	+5.92	Q
22	12	Daniel Heun	Germany	3:03.15	+5.98	Q
23	45	Teodor Peterson	Sweden	3:03.53	+6.36	Q
24	28	Andrew Newell	United States	3:03.67	+6.50	Q
25	18	Dušan Kožíšek	Czech Republic	3:03.75	+6.58	Q
26	6	Andrew Musgrave	Great Britain	3:03.88	+6.71	Q
27	48	Tim Tscharnke	Germany	3:03.97	+6.80	Q
28	34	Nikolay Morilov	Russia	3:04.24	+7.07	Q
29	53	Simeon Hamilton	United States	3:04.29	+7.12	Q
30	26	Renato Pasini	Italy	3:04.60	+7.43	Q
31	30	Devon Kershaw	Canada	3:04.67	+7.50	
32	13	Anssi Pentsinen	Finland	3:04.82	+7.65	
33	4	Maciej Staręga	Poland	3:04.85	+7.68	
34	49	Anti Saarepuu	Estonia	3:04.86	+7.69	
35	9	Alexis Bœuf	France	3:05.09	+7.92	
36	11	Torin Koos	United States	3:05.36	+8.19	
37	7	Evgeniy Belov	Russia	3:05.68	+8.51	
38	50	Jöri Kindschi	Switzerland	3:05.75	+8.58	
39	19	Josef Wenzl	Germany	3:05.89	+8.72	
40	20	Christoph Eigenmann	Switzerland	3:06.18	+9.01	
41	22	Øystein Pettersen	Norway	3:06.27	+9.10	
42	47	Cyril Miranda	France	3:06.42	+9.25	
43	33	Fulvio Scola	Italy	3:06.68	+9.51	
44	41	Kein Einaste	Estonia	3:07.31	+10.14	
45	3	Hannes Dotzler	Germany	3:08.07	+10.90	
46	57	Ivan Bilosyuk	Ukraine	3:08.18	+11.01	
47	32	Timo Simonlatser	Estonia	3:08.36	+11.19	
48	8	Nobu Naruse	Japan	3:08.45	+11.28	
49	54	Maciej Kreczmer	Poland	3:08.48	+11.31	
49	55	Boštjan Klavžar	Slovenia	3:08.48	+11.31	
51	51	Stefan Kuhn	Canada	3:09.16	+11.99	
52	61	Petr Novák	Czech Republic	3:09.28	+12.11	
53	52	Harald Wurm	Austria	3:09.53	+12.36	
54	14	Markus Bader	Austria	3:09.65	+12.48	
55	59	Max Hauke	Austria	3:10.66	+13.49	
56	56	Sergey Cherepanov	Kazakhstan	3:11.27	+14.10	
57	1	Modestas Vaičiulis	Lithuania	3:12.77	+15.60	
58	5	Kris Freeman	United States	3:13.64	+16.47	
59	83	Paul Constantin Pepene	Romania	3:13.73	+16.56	
60	58	Aleksei Novoselski	Lithuania	3:13.74	+16.57	
61	68	Andrew Young	Great Britain	3:14.42	+17.25	
62	2	Peter Mlynár	Slovakia	3:14.89	+17.72	
63	63	Ben Sim	Australia	3:15.52	+18.35	
64	62	Gennadiy Matviyenko	Kazakhstan	3:18.47	+21.30	
65	60	Rinalds Kostjukovs	Latvia	3:18.51	+21.34	
66	67	Myroslav Bilosyuk	Ukraine	3:18.88	+21.71	
67	78	Jens Hulgaard	Denmark	3:19.13	+21.96	
68	75	Juris Damškalns	Latvia	3:19.19	+22.02	
69	81	Lasse Hulgaard	Denmark	3:19.49	+22.32	
70	64	Mark van der Ploeg	Australia	3:19.86	+22.69	
71	69	Nick Grimmer	Australia	3:19.96	+22.79	
72	66	Roman Leybyuk	Ukraine	3:20.32	+23.15	
73	98	Ivan Burgov	Bulgaria	3:20.68	+23.51	
74	86	Callum Smith	Great Britain	3:20.97	+23.80	
75	85	Yerdos Akhmadiyev	Kazakhstan	3:21.22	+24.05	
76	79	Asger Fischer Mølgaard	Denmark	3:21.28	+24.11	
77	72	Zoltán Tagscherer	Hungary	3:22.37	+25.20	
78	84	Oskars Muižnieks	Latvia	3:22.92	+25.75	
79	94	Artem Rojin	Kyrgyzstan	3:23.76	+26.59	
80	96	Petrică Hogiu	Romania	3:23.79	+26.62	
81	65	Francesc Soulie	Andorra	3:23.88	+26.71	
82	93	Milán Szabó	Hungary	3:24.93	+27.76	
83	87	Simeon Deyanov	Bulgaria	3:25.69	+28.52	
84	88	Edi Dadić	Croatia	3:26.35	+29.18	
85	97	Kristian Wulff	Denmark	3:26.41	+29.24	
86	102	Dimitrios Kappas	Greece	3:27.54	+30.37	
87	105	Anton Sinapov	Bulgaria	3:27.57	+30.40	
88	90	Victor Pinzaru	Moldova	3:27.91	+30.74	
89	77	Simon James Platt	Great Britain	3:28.46	+31.29	
90	80	Roberts Slotiņš	Latvia	3:28.80	+31.63	
91	92	Sergey Mikayelyan	Armenia	3:29.44	+32.27	
92	73	Aleksandr Ossipov	Kazakhstan	3:30.41	+33.24	
93	74	Chris Darlington	Australia	3:31.64	+34.47	
94	76	Bijan Kangarloo	Iran	3:31.92	+34.75	
95	95	Imre Tagscherer	Hungary	3:33.09	+35.92	
96	89	Andrej Burić	Croatia	3:33.20	+36.03	
97	106	Mladen Plakalović	Bosnia and Herzegovina	3:34.06	+36.89	
98	82	Vytautas Strolia	Lithuania	3:35.65	+38.48	
99	122	Balázs Gond	Hungary	3:36.98	+39.81	
100	91	Daniel Kuzmin	Israel	3:39.15	+41.98	
101	108	Carlos Lannes	Argentina	3:40.22	+43.05	
102	104	Tadevos Poghosyan	Armenia	3:43.15	+45.98	
103	99	Sattar Seid	Iran	3:44.77	+47.60	
104	100	Alexis Gkounko	Greece	3:44.97	+47.80	
105	107	Peter-James Barron	Ireland	3:45.87	+48.70	
106	113	Leandro Ribela	Brazil	3:47.55	+50.38	
107	109	Abolfazl Savei	Iran	3:50.36	+53.19	
108	101	Hovhannes Sargsyan	Armenia	3:51.28	+54.11	
109	111	Yasin Shemshaki	Iran	3:51.41	+54.24	
110	112	Andrej Petrov	Macedonia	3:51.94	+54.77	
111	103	Shavarsh Gasparyan	Armenia	3:52.40	+55.23	
112	121	Federico Pablo Cichero	Argentina	3:52.55	+55.38	
113	117	Sote Andreski	Macedonia	3:52.74	+55.57	
114	110	Georgios Nakas	Greece	3:57.27	+1:00.10	
115	114	Toni Stanoeski	Macedonia	4:07.88	+1:10.71	
116	116	Cesar Baena	Venezuela	4:16.43	+1:19.26	
117	115	Tošo Stanoeski	Macedonia	4:19.98	+1:22.81	
118	119	Philip Boit	Kenya	4:25.32	+1:28.15	
119	118	Rory Morrish	Ireland	4:27.95	+1:30.78	
120	120	Bernardo Baena	Venezuela	5:25.80	+2:28.63	
	70	Benjamin Koons	New Zealand			
	71	Nils Koons	New Zealand			

=== Quarterfinals ===
Quarterfinal 1

Rank	Seed	Athlete	Country	Time	Deficit	Note
1	1	Jesper Modin	Sweden	2:59.9		Q
2	10	Petter Northug	Norway	3:00.1	+0.2	Q
3	21	Len Valjas	Canada	3:00.2	+0.3	
4	11	David Hofer	Italy	3:00.2	+0.3	
5	20	Martin Koukal	Czech Republic	3:04.7	+4.8	
6	30	Renato Pasini	Italy	3:33.7	+33.8	

Quarterfinal 2

Rank	Seed	Athlete	Country	Time	Deficit	Note
1	7	Ola Vigen Hattestad	Norway	2:57.0		Q
2	4	Dario Cologna	Switzerland	2:57.0	+0.0	Q
3	17	Peeter Kümmel	Estonia	2:57.2	+0.2	LL
4	24	Andrew Newell	United States	2:57.5	+0.5	LL
5	14	Martti Jylhä	Finland	2:57.8	+0.8	
6	27	Tim Tscharnke	Germany	3:02.3	+5.3	

Quarterfinal 3

Rank	Seed	Athlete	Country	Time	Deficit	Note
1	5	Marcus Hellner	Sweden	2:57.2		Q
2	15	Federico Pellegrino	Italy	2:57.5	+0.3	Q
3	16	Alexei Petukhov	Russia	2:58.2	+1.0	
4	6	Eirik Brandsdal	Norway	2:58.4	+1.2	
5	25	Dušan Kožíšek	Czech Republic	3:00.0	+2.8	
6	26	Andrew Musgrave	Great Britain	3:02.9	+5.7	

Quarterfinal 4

Rank	Seed	Athlete	Country	Time	Deficit	Note
1	12	Emil Jönsson	Sweden	2:57.5		Q
2	9	Alex Harvey	Canada	2:57.5	+0.0	Q
3	2	Anders Gløersen	Norway	2:57.6	+0.1	
4	19	Matias Strandvall	Finland	2:58.6	+1.1	
5	29	Simeon Hamilton	United States	2:58.7	+1.2	
6	22	Daniel Heun	Germany	2:59.1	+1.6	

Quarterfinal 5

Rank	Seed	Athlete	Country	Time	Deficit	Note
1	3	Martin Jäger	Switzerland	2:58.2		Q
2	28	Nikolay Morilov	Russia	2:58.4	+0.2	Q
3	23	Teodor Peterson	Sweden	2:58.5	+0.3	
4	18	Mikhail Devyatyarov, Jr.	Russia	2:58.8	+0.6	
5	13	Bernhard Tritscher	Austria	2:59.6	+1.4	
6	8	Yuichi Onda	Japan	3:39.0	+40.8	

=== Semifinals ===
Semifinal 1

Rank	Seed	Athlete	Country	Time	Deficit	Note
1	10	Petter Northug	Norway	2:58.6		Q
2	7	Ola Vigen Hattestad	Norway	2:58.7	+0.1	Q
3	1	Jesper Modin	Sweden	2:58.8	+0.2	LL
4	17	Peeter Kümmel	Estonia	2:59.1	+0.5	LL
5	4	Dario Cologna	Switzerland	2:59.9	+0.8	
6	15	Federico Pellegrino	Italy	3:01.6	+3.0	

Semifinal 2

Rank	Seed	Athlete	Country	Time	Deficit	Note
1	5	Marcus Hellner	Sweden	3:02.2		Q
2	12	Emil Jönsson	Sweden	3:02.3	+0.1	Q
3	9	Alex Harvey	Canada	3:02.9	+0.7	
4	28	Nikolay Morilov	Russia	3:05.0	+2.8	
5	24	Andrew Newell	United States	3:05.2	+3.0	
6	3	Martin Jäger	Switzerland	3:05.3	+3.1	

=== Finals ===
Rank	Seed	Athlete	Country	Time	Deficit	Note
1st place, gold medalist(s)	5	Marcus Hellner	Sweden	2:57.4		
2nd place, silver medalist(s)	10	Petter Northug	Norway	2:58.0	+0.6	
3rd place, bronze medalist(s)	12	Emil Jönsson	Sweden	2:58.5	+1.1	
4	7	Ola Vigen Hattestad	Norway	2:59.8	+2.4	
5	1	Jesper Modin	Sweden	3:00.4	+3.0	
6	17	Peeter Kümmel	Estonia	3:01.4	+4.0	

== See also ==
- 2011 IPC Biathlon and Cross-Country Skiing World Championships – Men's sprint
