= Emil Jönsson =

Swedish cross-country skier

Emil Jönsson Haag
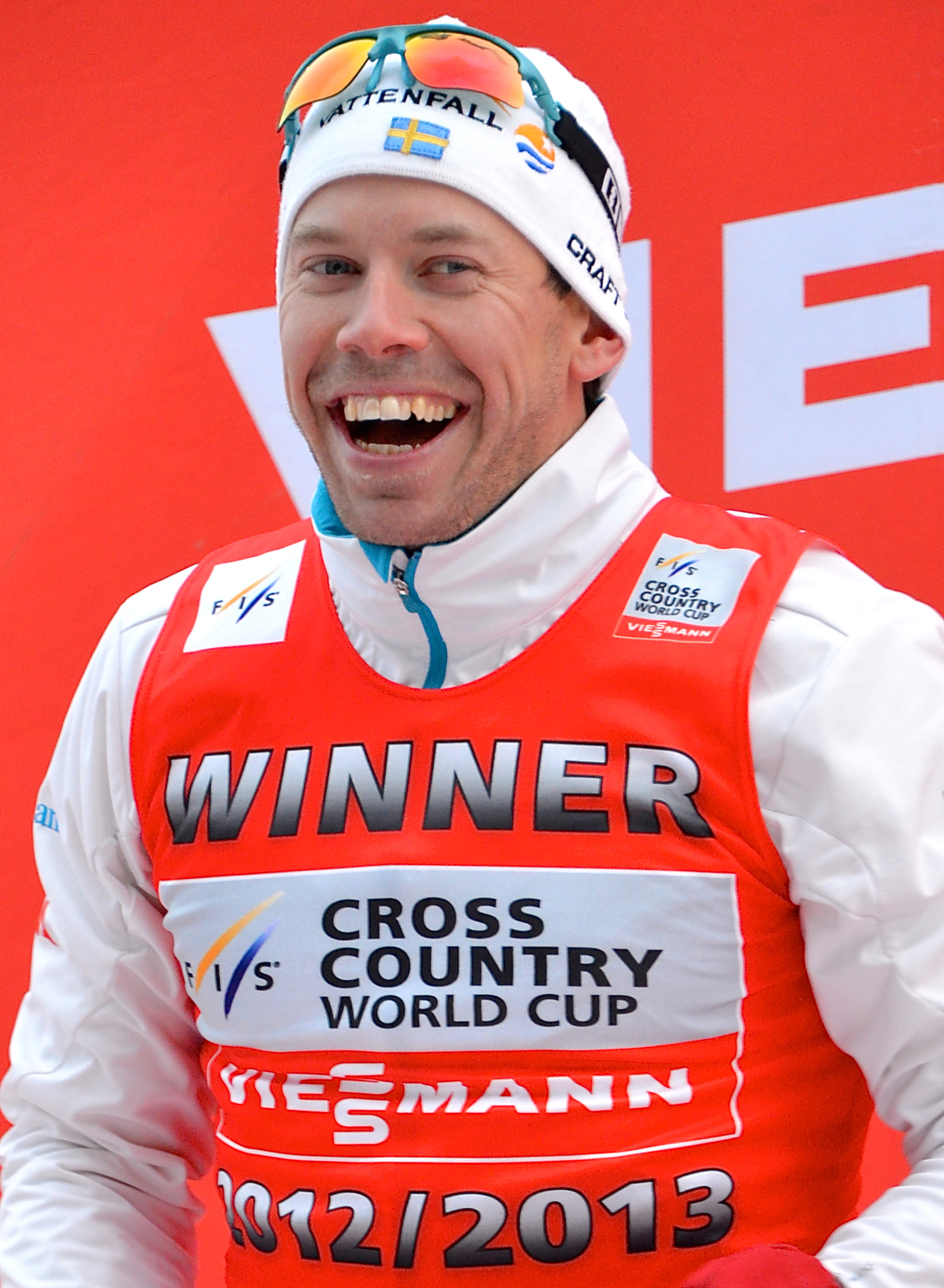
- Emil Jönsson in March 2013

Personal information
- Full name: Karl Emil Jönsson Haag
- Nationality: Sweden
- Born: 15 August 1985 (age 40) Årsunda, Sweden
- Height: 1.72 m (5 ft 8 in)
- Spouse: Anna Haag (m. 2018)

Sport
- Sport: Skiing
- Club: Anna & Emil Sportklubb

World Cup career
- Seasons: 14 – (2004, 2006–2018)
- Indiv. starts: 150
- Indiv. podiums: 25
- Indiv. wins: 16
- Team starts: 15
- Team podiums: 6
- Team wins: 1
- Overall titles: 0 – (6th in 2010, 2011)
- Discipline titles: 3 – (3 SP)
Medal record
Men's cross-country skiing
Representing Sweden
Olympic Games
Bronze medal – third place	2014 Sochi	Individual sprint
Bronze medal – third place	2014 Sochi	Team sprint
World Championships
Silver medal – second place	2013 Val di Fiemme	Team sprint
Bronze medal – third place	2011 Oslo	Individual sprint
Paralympic Games
Silver medal – second place	2022 Beijing	12.5km freestyle
Bronze medal – third place	2022 Beijing	20 km classical
Bronze medal – third place	2022 Beijing	1.5 km freestyle sprint
Junior World Championships
Bronze medal – third place	2005 Rovaniemi	Individual sprint

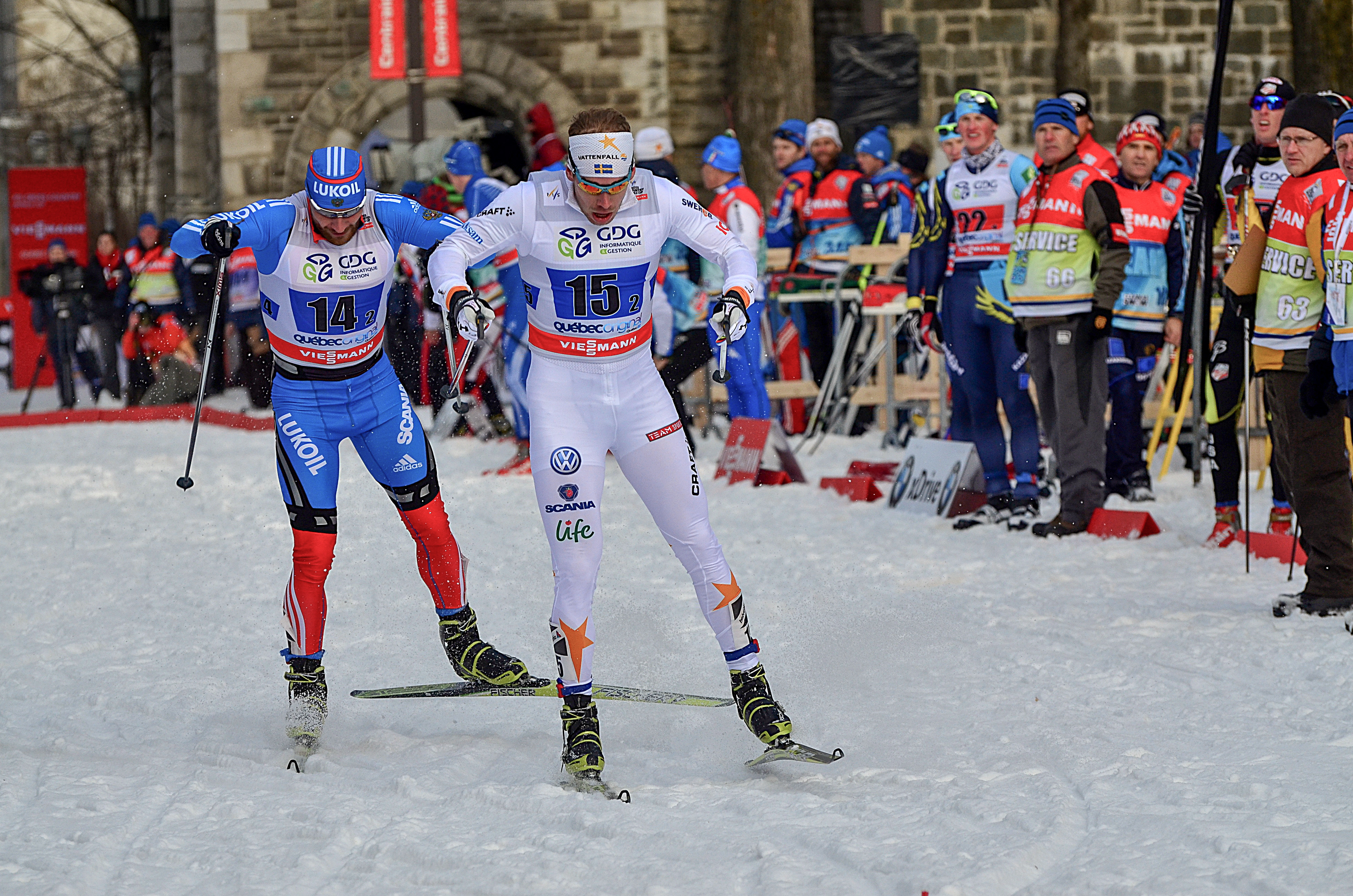
Emil Jönsson during a World Cup event in Quebec City, in December 2012. He won the event.

Emil Jönsson Haag (born 15 August 1985) is a Swedish retired cross-country skier who competed between 2004 and 2018.

== Career ==
At the 2010 Winter Olympics in Vancouver, he finished seventh in the individual sprint event.

He has twelve World Cup victories, all in sprint events, since 2008. He won the FIS Cross-Country Sprint World Cup in 2009–10 and 2010–11.

He won bronze in the sprint at the 2014 Winter Olympics in Sochi.

In March 2018, his retirement from cross-country skiing following the 2017–2018 season was announced.

Following his retirement he became sighted guide for visually impaired para athlete Zebastian Modin. They participated together at the 2022 Winter Paralympics and won a bronze medal in men's 20 km classical.

== Cross-country skiing results ==
All results are sourced from the International Ski Federation (FIS).

=== Olympic Games ===
- 2 medals – (2 bronze)

Year	Age	15 km individual	30 km skiathlon	50 km mass start	Sprint	4 × 10 km relay	Team sprint
2010	24	—	—	—	7	—	—
2014	28	—	—	—	Bronze	—	Bronze

=== World Championships ===
- 4 medals – (2 gold, 1 silver, 1 bronze)

Year	Age	15 km individual	30 km skiathlon	50 km mass start	Sprint	4 × 10 km relay	Team sprint
2007	21	—	—	—	6	—	—
2009	23	—	—	—	13	—	6
2011	25	—	—	—	Bronze	—	7
2013	27	—	—	—	4	—	Silver
2017	31	16	—	—	—	—	8

=== World Cup ===
==== Season titles ====
- 3 titles – (3 sprint)

Season
Season	Discipline
2010	Sprint
2011	Sprint
2013	Sprint

==== Season standings ====
Season	Age	Discipline standings			Ski Tour standings			
Season	Age	Overall	Distance	Sprint	Nordic Opening	Tour de Ski	World Cup Final	Ski Tour Canada
2004	18	NC	—	NC	—N/a	—N/a	—N/a	—N/a
2006	20	177	—	77	—N/a	—N/a	—N/a	—N/a
2007	21	20	NC	3rd place, bronze medalist(s)	—N/a	—	—N/a	—N/a
2008	22	15	NC	2nd place, silver medalist(s)	—N/a	—	50	—N/a
2009	23	28	NC	7	—N/a	—	67	—N/a
2010	24	6	61	1st place, gold medalist(s)	—N/a	DNF	30	—N/a
2011	25	6	36	1st place, gold medalist(s)	18	DNF	10	—N/a
2012	26	33	81	8	—	41	DNF	—N/a
2013	27	7	33	1st place, gold medalist(s)	9	DNF	15	—N/a
2014	28	45	109	14	—	—	DNF	—N/a
2015	29	48	79	17	42	DNF	—N/a	—N/a
2016	30	47	62	25	20	DNF	—N/a	—
2017	31	39	60	26	42	—	18	—N/a
2018	32	54	NC	21	—	—	68	—N/a

==== Individual podiums ====
- 16 victories – (13 WC, 3 SWC)
- 25 podiums – (20 WC, 5 SWC)

No.	Season	Date	Location	Race	Level	Place
1	2006–07	21 March 2007	Stockholm, Sweden	1.0 km Sprint C	World Cup	2nd
2	2007–08	1 December 2007	Rukatunturi, Finland	1.2 km Sprint C	World Cup	2nd
3	2007–08	26 January 2008	Canmore, Canada	1.2 km Sprint F	World Cup	1st
4	2007–08	27 February 2008	Stockholm, Sweden	1.0 km Sprint C	World Cup	3rd
5	2007–08	5 March 2008	Drammen, Norway	1.0 km Sprint C	World Cup	3rd
6	2008–09	16 January 2009	Whistler, Canada	1.2 km Sprint C	World Cup	1st
7	2008–09	13 March 2009	Valdidentro, Italy	1.7 km Sprint F	World Cup	3rd
8	2009–10	4 January 2010	Prague, Czech Republic	1.2 km Sprint C	Stage World Cup	1st
9	2009–10	17 January 2010	Otepää, Estonia	1.4 km Sprint C	World Cup	1st
10	2009–10	2 February 2010	Canmore, Canada	1.7 km Sprint C	World Cup	1st
11	2009–10	11 March 2010	Drammen, Norway	1.0 km Sprint C	World Cup	1st
12	2009–10	17 March 2010	Stockholm, Sweden	1.1 km Sprint C	Stage World Cup	3rd
13	2010–11	4 December 2010	Düsseldorf, Germany	1.7 km Sprint F	World Cup	1st
14	2010–11	12 December 2010	Davos, Switzerland	1.4 km Sprint F	World Cup	1st
15	2010–11	2 January 2011	Oberstdorf, Germany	1.2 km Sprint C	Stage World Cup	1st
16	2010–11	20 February 2011	Drammen, Norway	1.6 km Sprint F	World Cup	1st
17	2010–11	13 March 2011	Lahti, Finland	1.4 km Sprint C	World Cup	1st
18	2010–11	16 March 2011	Stockholm, Sweden	1.0 km Sprint C	Stage World Cup	1st
19	2011–12	11 December 2011	Davos, Switzerland	1.5 km Sprint F	World Cup	3rd
20	2011–12	4 March 2012	Lahti, Finland	1.4 km Sprint C	World Cup	1st
21	2012–13	8 December 2012	Quebec City, Canada	1.6 km Sprint F	World Cup	1st
22	2012–13	15 December 2012	Canmore, Canada	1.3 km Sprint F	World Cup	1st
23	2012–13	12 January 2013	Liberec, Czech Republic	1.6 km Sprint C	World Cup	2nd
24	2012–13	9 March 2013	Lahti, Finland	1.55 km Sprint F	World Cup	1st
25	2013–14	14 March 2014	Falun, Sweden	1.4 km Sprint C	Stage World Cup	2nd

==== Team podiums ====
- 1 victory – (1 TS)
- 6 podiums – (1 RL, 5 TS)

No.	Season	Date	Location	Race	Level	Place	Teammate(s)
1	2007–08	28 October 2007	Gällivare, Sweden	6 × 1.5 km Team Sprint F	World Cup	3rd	Hellner
2	2008–09	18 January 2009	Whistler, Canada	6 × 1.6 km Team Sprint F	World Cup	1st	Bryntesson
3	2010–11	5 December 2010	Düsseldorf, Germany	6 × 1.6 km Team Sprint F	World Cup	2nd	Larsson
4	2012–13	25 November 2012	Gällivare, Sweden	4 × 7.5 km Relay C/F	World Cup	2nd	Olsson / Richardsson / Hellner
5	2012–13	3 February 2013	Sochi, Russia	6 × 1.8 km Team Sprint C	World Cup	2nd	Peterson
6	2017–18	14 January 2018	Dresden, Germany	6 × 1.3 km Team Sprint F	World Cup	2nd	Peterson

== Personal life ==
Jönsson married fellow skier and olympic medalist Anna Haag in 2018. They spend their time between Östersund and Davos.
