= FIS Nordic World Ski Championships 2013 – Men's team sprint =

Men's team sprint at the FIS Nordic World Ski Championships 2013
- Date: 24 February 2013
- Competitors: 20 from 10 nations
- Winning time: 21:30.9

Medalists
gold medal	Alexei Petukhov; Nikita Kryukov	Russia
silver medal	Marcus Hellner; Emil Jönsson	Sweden
bronze medal	Nikolay Chebotko; Alexey Poltoranin	Kazakhstan

The men's team sprint took place on 24 February 2013.

== Results ==
=== Semifinals ===
Semifinal 1

Rank	Heat	Bib	Country	Athletes	Time	Note
1	1	1	Sweden	Marcus Hellner; Emil Jönsson	21:55.5	Q
2	1	5	Kazakhstan	Nikolay Chebotko; Alexey Poltoranin	21:55.5	Q
3	1	4	Italy	David Hofer; Federico Pellegrino	21:56.6	q
4	1	3	Russia	Alexei Petukhov; Nikita Kryukov	21:58.0	q
5	1	7	Czech Republic	Dušan Kožíšek; Aleš Razym	21:59.4	q
6	1	2	Norway	Pål Golberg; Petter Northug	22:03.5	
7	1	9	Japan	Hiroyuki Miyazawa; Yuichi Onda	22:03.5	
8	1	6	Switzerland	Eligius Tambornino; Joeri Kindschi	22:23.3	
9	1	8	Estonia	Raido Rankel; Peeter Kümmel	22:30.4	
10	1	10	Ukraine	Ruslan Perekhoda; Miroslav Bilosyuk	22:51.1	
11	1	11	New Zealand	Andrew Pohl; Nils Koons	23:43.0	
12	1	13	Denmark	Lasse Mølgård; Lasse Hulgård	23:47.2	
13	1	12	Australia	Phillip Bellingham; Callum Watson	24:02.8	
14	1	14	Lithuania	Lukas Jakeliūnas; Karolis Zlatkauskas	24:06.8	
	1	15	Latvia	Juris Damshkalns; Rinalds Kostjukovs	LAP	

Semifinal 2

Rank	Heat	Bib	Country	Athletes	Time	Note
1	2	16	Canada	Devon Kershaw; Alex Harvey	21:50.4	Q
2	2	20	Belarus	Sergei Dolidovich; Michail Semenov	21:50.4	Q
3	2	18	Germany	Tim Tscharnke; Axel Teichmann	21:50.5	q
4	2	17	France	Jean-Marc Gaillard; Maurice Manificat	21:54.4	q
5	2	22	Austria	Harald Wurm; Bernhard Tritscher	22:02.6	q
6	2	23	Poland	Maciej Kreczmer; Maciej Staręga	22:08.8	
7	2	21	United States	Erik Bjornsen; Andrew Newell	22:17.3	
8	2	19	Finland	Anssi Pentsinen; Matias Strandvall	22:32.2	
9	2	25	Romania	Petrică Hogiu; Paul Constantin Pepene	22:43.2	
10	2	24	Slovakia	Martin Bajčičák; Peter Mlynár	23:18.7	
11	2	26	China	Xu Wenlong; Sun Qinghai	24:16.3	
12	2	27	Slovenia	Boštjan Klavžar; Rok Tršan	24:25.6	
	2	28	Great Britain	Alexander Standen; Callum Smith	LAP	
	2	29	Iceland	Sævar Birgisson; Brynjar Leo Kristinsson	LAP	
	2	31	Hungary	Milán Szabó; Balázs Gond	LAP	
	2	30	Venezuela	Cesar Baena; Bernardo Baena	DNS	

=== Final ===
The final was held at 12:30.

Rank	Bib	Country	Athletes	Time	Deficit
1st place, gold medalist(s)	3	Russia	Alexei Petukhov; Nikita Kryukov	21:30.9	
2nd place, silver medalist(s)	1	Sweden	Marcus Hellner; Emil Jönsson	21:31.3	+0.4
3rd place, bronze medalist(s)	5	Kazakhstan	Nikolay Chebotko; Alexey Poltoranin	21:31.6	+0.7
4	16	Canada	Devon Kershaw; Alex Harvey	21:31.6	+0.7
5	4	Italy	David Hofer; Federico Pellegrino	21:34.4	+3.5
6	17	France	Jean-Marc Gaillard; Maurice Manificat	21:36.2	+5.3
7	22	Austria	Harald Wurm; Bernhard Tritscher	21:39.2	+8.3
8	7	Czech Republic	Dušan Kožíšek; Aleš Razym	21:39.3	+8.4
9	18	Germany	Tim Tscharnke; Axel Teichmann	21:40.6	+9.7
10	20	Belarus	Sergei Dolidovich; Michail Semenov	21:42.4	+11.5
