= FIS Nordic World Ski Championships 2011 – Men's 15 kilometre classical =

Men's 15 km classical interval start at the FIS Nordic World Ski Championships 2011
- Venue: Holmenkollen National Arena
- Date: 1 March 2011
- Competitors: 77 from 41 nations
- Winning time: 38:14.7

Medalists
gold medal	Matti Heikkinen	Finland
silver medal	Eldar Rønning	Norway
bronze medal	Martin Johnsrud Sundby	Norway

The Men's 15 km classical interval start was part of the FIS Nordic World Ski Championships 2011's events held in Oslo, Norway. The race went underway on 1 March 2011 at 13:00 CET. A 10 km qualifying race took place on 23 February at 11:00 CET. The defending world champion was Estonia's Andrus Veerpalu while the defending Olympic champion was Switzerland's Dario Cologna.

== Results ==
Rank	Bib	Athlete	Country	Time	Deficit
1st place, gold medalist(s)	68	Matti Heikkinen	Finland	38:14.7	
2nd place, silver medalist(s)	71	Eldar Rønning	Norway	38:28.0	+13.3
3rd place, bronze medalist(s)	70	Martin Johnsrud Sundby	Norway	38:46.6	+31.9
4	48	Stanislav Volzhentsev	Russia	38:51.3	+36.6
5	62	Sami Jauhojärvi	Finland	38:58.9	+44.2
6	69	Maurice Manificat	France	39:03.5	+48.8
7	75	Lukáš Bauer	Czech Republic	39:09.7	+55.0
8	56	Ville Nousiainen	Finland	39:11.0	+56.3
9	61	Tobias Angerer	Germany	39:24.8	+1:10.1
10	73	Maxim Vylegzhanin	Russia	39:25.7	+1:11.0
11	35	Sergey Cherepanov	Kazakhstan	39:35.0	+1:20.3
12	55	Keishin Yoshida	Japan	39:40.9	+1:26.2
13	66	Axel Teichmann	Germany	39:42.8	+1:28.1
14	44	Jaak Mae	Estonia	39:43.4	+1:28.7
15	52	Petter Eliassen	Norway	39:45.0	+1:30.3
16	41	Tero Similä	Finland	39:47.6	+1:32.9
17	60	Johan Olsson	Sweden	39:53.1	+1:38.4
18	72	Martin Jakš	Czech Republic	39:55.0	+1:40.3
19	54	Martin Bajčičák	Slovakia	40:11.5	+1:56.8
20	77	Alexander Legkov	Russia	40:13.9	+1:59.2
21	51	Sjur Røthe	Norway	40:14.5	+1:59.8
22	65	Anders Södergren	Sweden	40:22.5	+2:07.8
23	38	Algo Kärp	Estonia	40:22.9	+2:08.2
24	67	Kris Freeman	United States	40:24.4	+2:09.7
25	78	Dario Cologna	Switzerland	40:26.5	+2:11.8
26	37	Karel Tammjärv	Estonia	40:29.8	+2:15.1
27	40	Giovanni Gullo	Italy	40:32.8	+2:18.1
28	29	Kouhei Shimizu	Japan	40:40.6	+2:25.9
29	43	Noah Hoffman	United States	40:42.8	+2:28.1
30	59	Ivan Babikov	Canada	40:42.9	+2:28.2
31	64	Alexey Poltoranin	Kazakhstan	40:44.6	+2:29.9
32	58	Christophe Perrillat	France	40:50.5	+2:35.8
33	53	Thomas Moriggl	Italy	40:56.9	+2:42.2
34	74	Marcus Hellner	Sweden	41:00.6	+2:45.9
35	34	Michail Semenov	Belarus	41:04.9	+2:50.2
36	25	Roman Leybyuk	Ukraine	41:05.2	+2:50.5
37	63	Evgeniy Belov	Russia	41:05.4	+2:50.7
38	47	David Hofer	Italy	41:08.5	+2:53.8
39	46	Lars Flora	United States	41:09.5	+2:54.8
40	26	Yevgeniy Velichko	Kazakhstan	41:12.8	+2:58.1
41	49	Fulvio Scola	Italy	41:21.6	+3:06.9
42	76	Daniel Rickardsson	Sweden	41:27.1	+3:12.4
43	33	Ivan Bátory	Slovakia	41:31.5	+3:16.8
44	27	Alexander Lasutkin	Belarus	41:34.8	+3:20.1
45	45	Paul Constantin Pepene	Romania	41:37.0	+3:22.3
46	24	Veselin Tzinzov	Bulgaria	41:40.4	+3:25.7
47	50	Hannes Dotzler	Germany	41:43.9	+3:29.2
48	23	Len Väljas	Canada	41:45.9	+3:31.2
49	42	Benoit-Gilles Dufourd	France	41:51.5	+3:36.8
50	36	Andrew Musgrave	United Kingdom	42:00.2	+3:45.5
51	14	Simeon Hamilton	United States	42:08.3	+3:53.6
52	39	Stefan Kuhn	Canada	42:10.6	+3:55.9
53	13	Andrey Golovko	Kazakhstan	42:17.7	+4:03.0
54	18	Maciej Staręga	Poland	42:20.5	+4:05.8
55	28	Maciej Kreczmer	Poland	42:23.8	+4:09.1
56	8	Sergey Mikayelyan	Armenia	42:38.9	+4:24.2
57	57	George Grey	Canada	42:42.3	+4:27.6
58	30	Vicenç Vilarrubla	Spain	42:45.1	+4:30.4
59	31	Ben Sim	Australia	42:45.5	+4:30.8
60	16	Oleksiy Shvidkiy	Ukraine	42:55.1	+4:40.4
61	20	Myroslav Bilosyuk	Ukraine	42:59.2	+4:44.5
62	10	Edi Dadić	Croatia	43:17.7	+5:03
63	32	Javier Gutiérrez	Spain	43:19.8	+5:05.1
64	7	Sabahattin Oğlago	Turkey	43:21.6	+5:06.9
65	12	Francois Soulie	Andorra	43:40.7	+5:26.0
66	15	Callum Watson	Australia	43:56.4	+5:41.7
67	3	Ewan Watson	Australia	43:58.7	+5:44.0
68	2	Benjamin Koons	New Zealand	44:00.4	+5:45.7
69	19	Nils Koons	New Zealand	44:16.8	+6:02.1
70	4	Callum Smith	United Kingdom	44:26.9	+6:12.2
71	1	Mark van der Ploeg	Australia	44:40.5	+6:25.8
72	22	Ivan Bilosyuk	Ukraine	44:43.3	+6:28.6
73	5	Ivan Burgov	Bulgaria	44:57.1	+6:42.4
74	6	Asger Fischer Moelgaard	Denmark	45:19.1	+7:04.4
75	9	Arvis Liepiņš	Latvia	45:31.7	+7:17.0
76	11	Kristian Wulff	Denmark	45:49.9	+7:35.2
	17	Petrică Hogiu	Romania	DNF	
	21	Bernhard Tritscher	Austria	DNS	

== Qualification ==
Rank	Bib	Athlete	Country	Time	Deficit	Notes
1	36	Benjamin Koons	New Zealand	29:59.0		Q
2	39	Callum Smith	United Kingdom	30:15.9	+16.9	Q
3	47	Sergey Mikayelyan	Armenia	30:20.6	+21.6	Q
4	35	Mark van der Ploeg	Australia	30:24.6	+25.6	Q
5	31	Janis Paipals	Latvia	30:28.3	+29.3	Q
6	37	Ewan Watson	Australia	30:38.5	+39.5	Q
7	40	Aleksei Novoselski	Lithuania	30:41.5	+42.5	Q
8	44	Asger Fischer Moelgaard	Denmark	30:42.3	+43.3	Q
9	41	Ivan Burgov	Bulgaria	30:49.8	+50.8	Q
10	45	Sabahattin Oğlago	Turkey	30:50.4	+51.4	Q
11	30	Nick Grimmer	Australia	30:53.4	+54.4	
12	46	Jonas Thor Olsen	Denmark	30:57.3	+58.3	
13	27	Modestas Vaičiulis	Lithuania	31:07.4	+1:08.4	
14	22	Artem Rojin	Kyrgyzstan	31:27.1	+1:28.1	
15	42	Chris Darlington	Australia	31:45.3	+1:46.3	
16	34	Jens Hulgaard	Denmark	31:51.4	+1:52.4	
17	28	Nauris Bikernieks	Latvia	31:56.3	+1:57.3	
18	43	Andrej Burić	Croatia	31:57.5	+1:58.5	
19	19	Sattar Seid	Iran	32:05.2	+2:06.2	
20	26	Adam Konya	Hungary	32:10.3	+2:11.3	
21	29	Simeon Deyanov	Bulgaria	32:16.3	+2:17.3	
22	25	Simon James Platt	United Kingdom	32:18.9	+2:19.9	
23	16	Alexis Gkounko	Greece	32:26.6	+2:27.6	
24	20	Tadevos Poghosyan	Armenia	32:30.0	+2:31.0	
25	32	Vytautas Strolia	Lithuania	32:31.5	+2:32.5	
26	23	Carlos Lannes	Argentina	32:38.5	+2:39.5	
27	21	Federico Cichero	Argentina	32:45.1	+2:46.1	
28	18	Bijan Kangarloo	Iran	33:10.2	+3:11.2	
29	33	Anton Sinapov	Bulgaria	33:10.7	+3:11.7	
30	13	Daniel Kuzmin	Israel	33:19.0	+3:20.0	
30	38	Ha Tae Bok	South Korea	33:19.0	+3:20.0	
32	15	Shavarsh Gasparyan	Armenia	33:37.5	+3:38.5	
33	9	Csaba Cseke	Hungary	34:33.9	+4:34.9	
34	14	Yasin Shemshaki	Iran	34:38.5	+4:39.5	
35	12	Dimitrios Kappas	Greece	34:44.5	+4:45.5	
36	11	Georgios Nakas	Greece	34:47.7	+4:48.7	
37	24	Karoly Gombos	Hungary	34:48.5	+4:49.5	
38	10	Peter-James Barron	Ireland	35:16.6	+5:17.6	
39	6	Mate Palfy	Hungary	35:24.3	+5:25.3	
40	8	Hovhannes Sargsyan	Armenia	36:35.9	+6:36.9	
41	7	Abolfazl Savei	Iran	36:48.8	+6:49.8	
42	2	Philip Boit	Kenya	37:08.0	+7:09.0	
43	5	Leonardo Lutz	Brazil	39:04.4	+9:05.4	
44	17	Leandro Ribela	Brazil	39:10.7	+9:11.7	
45	4	Cesar Baena	Venezuela	39:33.4	+9:34.4	
46	3	Rory Morrish	Ireland	41:38.8	+11:39.8	
47	1	Bernardo Baena	Venezuela	44:22.6	+14:23.6	
	48	Andrew Young	United Kingdom	DNS		
