= Cross-country skiing at the 2014 Winter Olympics – Men's team sprint =

Men's team sprint at the XXII Olympic Winter Games
- Venue: Laura Biathlon & Ski Complex
- Dates: 19 February 2014
- Competitors: 46 from 23 nations
- Winning time: 23:14.89

Medalists
| 1st place, gold medalist(s) | | Iivo Niskanen; Sami Jauhojärvi | Finland |
| 2nd place, silver medalist(s) | | Maxim Vylegzhanin; Nikita Kryukov | Russia |
| 3rd place, bronze medalist(s) | | Emil Jönsson; Teodor Peterson | Sweden |

The men's team sprint cross-country skiing competition in the classical technique at the 2014 Sochi Olympics took place on 19 February at Laura Biathlon & Ski Complex. The race was won by Finland's Iivo Niskanen and Sami Jauhojärvi, followed by Russia's Maxim Vylegzhanin and Nikita Kriukov second (+0.97 seconds) and Sweden's Emil Jönsson and Teodor Peterson third (+15.12 seconds). Teamed up with Hannes Dotzler, Germany's anchor Tim Tscharnke clashed with Jauhojärvi's skis in the last leg, as Jauhojärvi changed his line. The results were protested by Germany, but the protest was rejected and the results were confirmed. Yelena Välbe, president of the Russian Ski Federation, told reporters: "Finland should be disqualified but the protest has already been rejected".

In November 2017 Maxim Vylegzhanin was disqualified for doping offenses, as a result Russia lost its silver medal. On 22 December, Nikita Kryukov was disqualified as well. On 1 February 2018, their results were restored as a result of the successful appeal.

== Results ==
The races were started at 14:05.

=== Semifinals ===
| Rank | Heat | Bib | Country | Athletes | Time | Note |
|---|---|---|---|---|---|---|
| 1 | 1 | 2 | Germany | Hannes Dotzler; Tim Tscharnke | 23:36.23 | Q |
| 2 | 1 | 6 | Czech Republic | Martin Jakš; Aleš Razým | 23:39.06 | Q |
| 3 | 1 | 5 | Switzerland | Dario Cologna; Gianluca Cologna | 23:42.31 | LL |
| 4 | 1 | 1 | Norway | Ola Vigen Hattestad; Petter Northug | 23:43.63 | LL |
| 5 | 1 | 3 | Italy | Federico Pellegrino; Dietmar Nöckler | 23:58.12 | |
| 6 | 1 | 4 | Canada | Devon Kershaw; Alex Harvey | 24:20.37 | |
| 7 | 1 | 9 | Estonia | Peeter Kümmel; Raido Ränkel | 24:26.49 | |
| 8 | 1 | 7 | Austria | Harald Wurm; Max Hauke | 25:01.23 | |
| 9 | 1 | 10 | Romania | Daniel Pripici; Paul Constantin Pepene | 26:06.80 | |
| | 1 | 8 | Great Britain | Andrew Young; Andrew Musgrave | DNF | |
| | 1 | 11 | China | Sun Qinghai; Xu Wenlong | DNS | |
| 1 | 2 | 16 | Finland | Iivo Niskanen; Sami Jauhojärvi | 23:26.13 | Q |
| 2 | 2 | 13 | Russia | Maxim Vylegzhanin; Nikita Kryukov | 23:26.91 | Q |
| 3 | 2 | 15 | Sweden | Emil Jönsson; Teodor Peterson | 23:28.22 | LL |
| 4 | 2 | 14 | Kazakhstan | Nikolay Chebotko; Alexey Poltoranin | 23:28.50 | LL |
| 5 | 2 | 17 | United States | Simi Hamilton; Erik Bjornsen | 23:29.14 | LL |
| 6 | 2 | 12 | France | Cyril Miranda; Jean-Marc Gaillard | 23:41.79 | LL |
| 7 | 2 | 19 | Japan | Hiroyuki Miyazawa; Yuichi Onda | 23:49.41 | |
| 8 | 2 | 18 | Poland | Maciej Kreczmer; Maciej Staręga | 23:53.09 | |
| 9 | 2 | 20 | Slovakia | Peter Mlynár; Martin Bajčičák | 24:58.06 | |
| 10 | 2 | 21 | Bulgaria | Andrey Gridin; Veselin Tsinzov | 25:11.06 | |
| 11 | 2 | 23 | Ukraine | Ruslan Perekhoda; Oleksiy Krasovsky | 25:31.13 | |
| 12 | 2 | 22 | Australia | Phil Bellingham; Callum Watson | 25:54.31 | |

=== Final ===
| Rank | Bib | Country | Athletes | Time | Deficit |
|---|---|---|---|---|---|
| 1st place, gold medalist(s) | 16 | Finland | Iivo Niskanen; Sami Jauhojärvi | 23:14.89 | — |
| 2nd place, silver medalist(s) | 13 | Russia | Maxim Vylegzhanin; Nikita Kryukov | 23:15.86 | +0.97 |
| 3rd place, bronze medalist(s) | 15 | Sweden | Emil Jönsson; Teodor Peterson | 23:30.01 | +15.12 |
| 4 | 1 | Norway | Ola Vigen Hattestad; Petter Northug | 23:33.55 | +18.66 |
| 5 | 5 | Switzerland | Dario Cologna; Gianluca Cologna | 23:35.90 | +21.01 |
| 6 | 17 | United States | Simi Hamilton; Erik Bjornsen | 23:49.95 | +35.06 |
| 7 | 2 | Germany | Hannes Dotzler; Tim Tscharnke | 23:57.02 | +42.13 |
| 8 | 14 | Kazakhstan | Nikolay Chebotko; Alexey Poltoranin | 24:01.38 | +46.49 |
| 9 | 6 | Czech Republic | Martin Jakš; Aleš Razým | 24:01.83 | +46.94 |
| 10 | 12 | France | Cyril Miranda; Jean-Marc Gaillard | DNS | |
