= Eligius Tambornino =

Swiss cross country skier (born 2012)

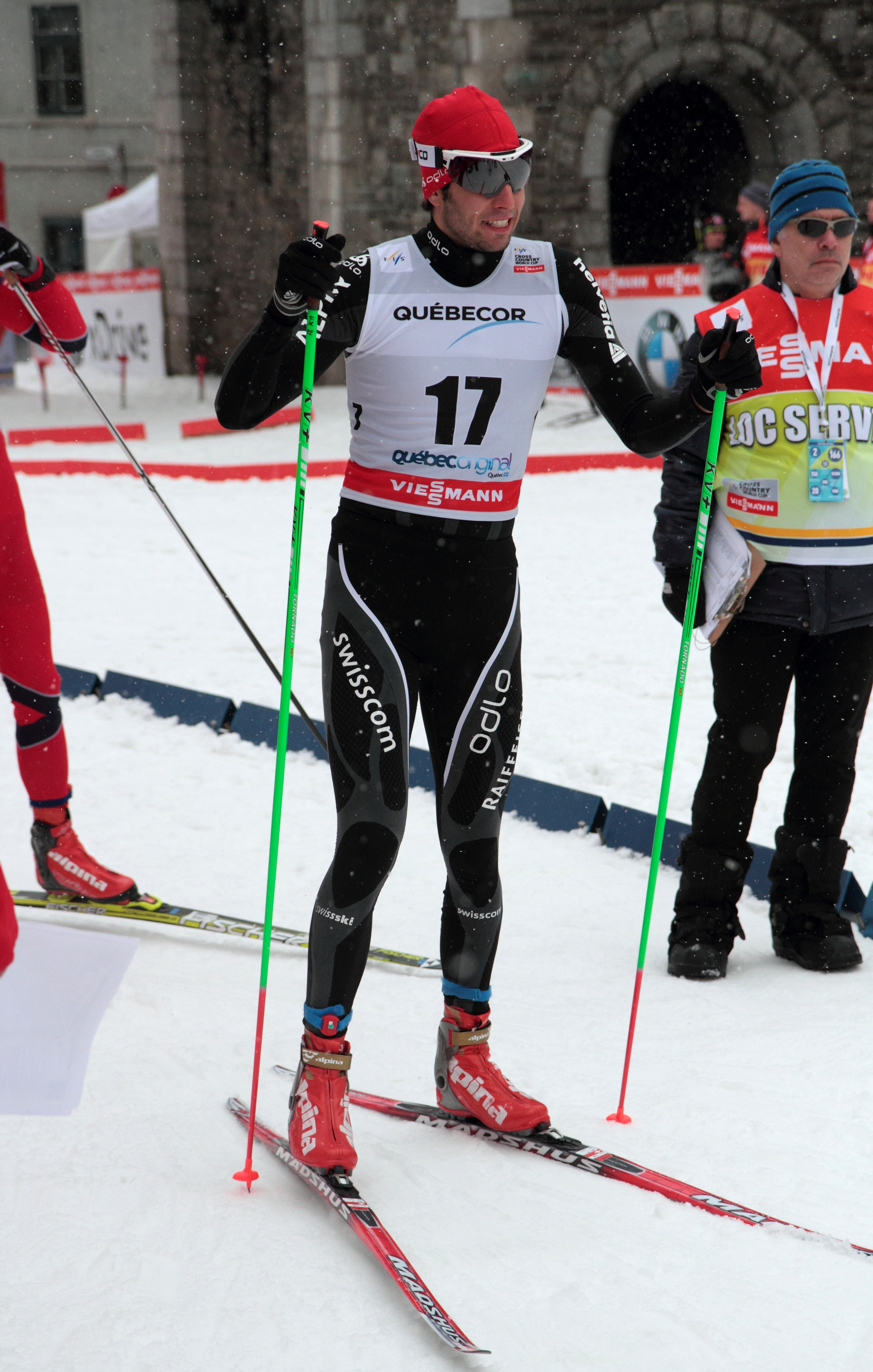
- Tambornino in 2012
- Born: 25 October 1986 (age 38); Chur, Graubünden, Switzerland
- Height: 183 cm (6 ft 0 in)
- Ski club: Trun Ski Club

Eligius Tambornino (born 25 October 1986) is a Swiss cross-country skier who has been competing since 2003.

At the FIS Nordic World Ski Championships 2009 in Liberec, Tambornino finished 21st in the individual sprint event. At the 2010 Winter Olympics in Vancouver, he finished 11th in the team sprint event and 49th in the individual sprint events. His best World Cup finish was fourth at a team sprint event in Germany in 2009 while his best individual finish was tenth in an individual sprint event at Switzerland in 2008.

He later switched to biathlon, making his World Cup debut in 2017.
