= Carlos Lannes =

Argentine cross-country skier (born 1979)

Carlos Lannes (born 22 February 1979) is an Argentine cross-country skier who has competed since 2004. He finished 82nd in the 15 km event at the 2010 Winter Olympics in Vancouver.

At the FIS Nordic World Ski Championships 2009 in Liberec, Lannes finished 111th in the individual sprint while being lapped in the 30 km mixed pursuit event.

His best career finish was third twice in lesser events in 2007 and 2008.
