= Xu Wenlong =

Chinese cross-country skier

Xu Wenlong (Chinese: 许文龙; born February 27, 1987) is a Chinese cross-country skier who has competed since 2007. At the 2010 Winter Olympics in Vancouver, he finished 19th in the team sprint and 68th in the individual sprint event.

He won the men's 10 km qualifying event at the FIS Nordic World Ski Championships 2009 in Liberec, Czech Republic.

Xu's best World Cup finish was 23rd in a 15 km event at Changchun in 2007. His best overall finish second in a 50 km race, also in Changchun, in early 2009.
