= Andrej Burić =

Croatian cross-country skier (born 1989)

Andrej Burić (born 6 February 1989 in Rijeka) is a Croatian cross-country skier who competed at the international level between 2005 and 2014. He finished 75th in the 15 km event at the 2010 Winter Olympics in Vancouver.

At the FIS Nordic World Ski Championships 2009 in Liberec, Burić finished 99th in the individual sprint event.

His best career finish was ninth twice in lesser events in Croatia, earned in 2008 and 2009.
