= FIS Nordic World Ski Championships 2009 – Men's team sprint =

Men's team sprint at the FIS Nordic World Ski Championships 2009
- Venue: Liberec
- Date: 25 February 2009
- Competitors: 46 from 23 nations
- Teams: 23
- Winning time: 22:48.5

Medalists
gold medal	Johan Kjølstad; Ola Vigen Hattestad	Norway
silver medal	Tobias Angerer; Axel Teichmann	Germany
bronze medal	Ville Nousiainen; Sami Jauhojärvi	Finland

The Men's team sprint took place on 25 February 2009. Team sprint qualifying at 11:00 CET and finals at 13:00 CET. The defending world champions were Italy's Renato Pasini and Cristian Zorzi.

== Results ==
Q – Qualified for final round due to placing in heat
q – Qualified for final round due to times
PF – Placing decided by Photo finish

=== Semifinals ===
Qualification: First 3 in each heat (Q) and the next 6 fastest (q) advance to the final.

Semifinal 1

Rank	Heat	Bib	Country	Athletes	Time	Note

Semifinal 2

Rank	Heat	Bib	Country	Athletes	Time	Note

=== Final ===
Rank	Bib	Country	Athlete	Time	Deficit	Note
1st place, gold medalist(s)	12	Norway	Johan Kjølstad; Ola Vigen Hattestad	22:48.5	—	
2nd place, silver medalist(s)	14	Germany	Tobias Angerer; Axel Teichmann	22:49.0	+0.5	PF
3rd place, bronze medalist(s)	7	Finland	Ville Nousiainen; Sami Jauhojärvi	22:49.0	+0.5	PF
4	13	Russia	Andrey Parfenov; Nikita Kryukov	22:50.7	+2.2	
5	15	France	Jean-Marc Gaillard; Cyril Miranda	22:51.5	+3.0	
6	1	Sweden	Mats Larsson; Emil Jönsson	22:52.8	+4.3	
7	3	Kazakhstan	Alexey Poltoranin; Nikolay Chebotko	22:54.3	+5.8	
8	4	Estonia	Aivar Rehemaa; Andrus Veerpalu	22:57.2	+8.7	
9	16	Canada	George Grey; Devon Kershaw	22:58.2	+9.7	
10	18	Japan	Shohei Honda; Yuichi Onda	22:58.8	+10.3	
