= 2006–07 Tour de Ski =

Cross-country skiing event

Tour de Ski
2006–07 FIS Cross-Country World Cup

Ski tour details
- Venue(s): Munich, Germany; Oberstdorf, Germany; Asiago, Italy; Val di Fiemme, Italy
- Dates: 31 December 2006 – 7 January 2007
- Stages: 8 (6 completed, 2 cancelled)

Results
Men
Jersey awarded to the men's overall winner	Winner	Tobias Angerer (GER)
	Second	Alexander Legkov (RUS)
	Third	Simen Østensen (NOR)
Jersey awarded to the men's sprint classification winner	Sprint	Tor Arne Hetland (NOR)
Women
Jersey awarded to the women's overall winner	Winner	Virpi Kuitunen (FIN)
	Second	Marit Bjørgen (NOR)
	Third	Valentyna Shevchenko (UKR)
Jersey awarded to the women's sprint classification winner	Sprint	Virpi Kuitunen (FIN)

The 2006–07 Tour de Ski was the first Tour to take place, from 31 December 2006 until 7 January 2007. It was won by German Tobias Angerer for men, while Finn Virpi Kuitunen won the women's Tour.

The first edition of the tour was held in Germany and Italy, with six races spread out over eight days, including two separate days of rest. The prize money for the event amounted to 750,000 Swiss francs, shared out on both men and women. Men's and women's events were held together on the same days.

== Origin ==
Cross-country skiing had been through a period of renewal from the early 1980s, when the free technique was first introduced to the World Championships which led to a rush of new events, including pursuit skiing, sprint skiing and eventually long mass start races, to complement the traditional time trial or individual start style of skiing. The Tour de Ski was modelled on the Tour de France of cycling and the idea has been reported to come from a meeting between former Olympic gold medallist Vegard Ulvang and Jürg Capol, the International Ski Federation's (FIS) chief executive officer for cross-country competitions, in Ulvang's sauna in Maridalen, Norway. Their idea was to create a stage competition consisting of different events which they expected would lead to several days of continuous excitement before the most complete skiers would become Tour de Ski champions.

== Ranking ==
The overall results were based on the aggregate time for all events, as well as bonus seconds awarded on sprint and mass start stages.

The two sprint races carried bonus seconds for the finish, which were subtracted from the overall time, as follows:

Finishing position	1	2	3	4	5	6	7	8	9	10	11	12	13	14	15	16	17	18	19	20	21	22	23	24	25	26	27	28	29	30
Seconds deducted	50	40	30	28	26	25	24	23	22	21	20	19	18	17	16	15	14	13	12	11	10	9	8	7	6	5	4	3	2	1

In mass start competitions, intermediate points carried bonus seconds; 15 to the winner, 10 to number two, and 5 to number three. The same number of seconds were awarded at the finish. In the 30 km race there were two intermediate points, in the 15 km race one intermediate point.

== Stages ==
Date	Place	Country	Women's distance	Men's distance	Event	Technique	Women's winner	Men's winner
~~29 December~~	~~Nové Město na Moravě~~	~~Czech Republic~~	~~3 km~~	~~4.5 km~~	Prologue, interval start - cancelled	Classic	Not available	Not available
~~30 December~~	~~Nové Město na Moravě~~	~~Czech Republic~~	~~10 km~~	~~15 km~~	Pursuit, starting intervals according to results in prologue - cancelled	Freestyle	Not available	Not available
31 December	Munich	Germany	1100 m	1100 m	Sprint	Freestyle	Marit Bjørgen (NOR)	Christoph Eigenmann (SUI)
2 January	Oberstdorf	Germany	5+5 km	10+10 km	Double pursuit	Classic/Freestyle	Kristin Størmer Steira (NOR)	Vincent Vittoz (FRA)
3 January	Oberstdorf	Germany	10 km	15 km	Interval start	Classic	Petra Majdič (SLO)	Franz Göring (GER)
5 January	Asiago	Italy	1200 m	1200 m	Sprint	Freestyle	Virpi Kuitunen (FIN)	Tor Arne Hetland (NOR)
6 January	Cavalese	Italy	15 km	30 km	Mass start	Classic	Virpi Kuitunen (FIN)	Eldar Rønning (NOR)
7 January	Cavalese	Italy	10 km	15 km	Pursuit. Hill climb finish. Starting intervals according to time differences in overall ranking.	Freestyle	Virpi Kuitunen (FIN)	Tobias Angerer (GER)

== Favourites ==
Dagbladet's Brynjar Skjærli listed Finland's Virpi Kuitunen as the main favourite in the women's event, with Marit Bjørgen the main challenger. Justyna Kowalczyk, Petra Majdič, Kateřina Neumannová, Evi Sachenbacher-Stehle, Claudia Künzel-Nystad, Aino-Kaisa Saarinen, Vibeke Skofterud and Kristina Šmigun were listed as "outsiders" or dark horses. In the men's event, Tobias Angerer was the favourite, with Yevgeny Dementyev, Tor Arne Hetland, Petter Northug, Eldar Rønning, Anders Södergren, Jens Arne Svartedal and Axel Teichmann all listed as challengers. Frode Estil was named as an outsider.

== Stage 1: Sprint Munich, 31 December ==
This was held at Munich Olympic Stadium in front of 6,500 spectators.

Women's event, 822 m

The listed times were achieved in the qualification race.

Final A

Rank	Name	Nation	Time	Bonus seconds
1	Marit Bjørgen	NOR	1:31.9	50
2	Arianna Follis	ITA	1:31.8	40
3	Chandra Crawford	CAN	1:32.1	30
4	Aino-Kaisa Saarinen	FIN	1:34.2	28
5	Petra Majdič	SLO	1:33.8	26
6	Virpi Kuitunen	FIN	1:32.6	25

Final B

Rank	Name	Nation	Time	Bonus seconds
7	Pirjo Manninen	FIN	1:36.2	24
8	Claudia Künzel-Nystad	GER	1:34.0	23
9	Britta Norgren	SWE	1:32.6	22
10	Karin Moroder	ITA	1:35.9	21
11	Evi Sachenbacher-Stehle	GER	1:35.5	20
12	Caroline Weibel	FRA	1:34.8	19

Tour de Ski standings

Rank	Name	Nation	Total time
1	Marit Bjørgen	NOR	41.9''
2	Arianna Follis	ITA	+9.9
3	Chandra Crawford	CAN	+20.2
4	Aino-Kaisa Saarinen	FIN	+24.3
5	Virpi Kuitunen	FIN	+25.7
6	Petra Majdič	SLO	+25.9

Sprint standings

Rank	Name	Nation	Points
1	Marit Bjørgen	NOR	50
2	Arianna Follis	ITA	40
3	Chandra Crawford	CAN	30
4	Aino-Kaisa Saarinen	FIN	28
5	Petra Majdič	SLO	26
6	Virpi Kuitunen	FIN	25

Men's event, 1200 m

The listed times were achieved in the qualification race.

Northug fell in the first curve of the final, taking Pettersen and Fredriksson with him.

Final A

Rank	Name	Nation	Time	Bonus seconds
1	Christoph Eigenmann	SUI	1:20.3	50
2	Devon Kershaw	CAN	1:24.0	40
3	Roddy Darragon	FRA	1:23.7	30
4	Thobias Fredriksson	SWE	1:23.9	28
5	Petter Northug	NOR	1:25.1	26
6	Øystein Pettersen	NOR	1:22.1	25

Final B

Rank	Name	Nation	Time	Bonus seconds
7	Simen Østensen	NOR	1:22.8	24
8	Tor Arne Hetland	NOR	1:23.4	23
9	Björn Lind	SWE	1:24.4	22
10	Fredrik Östberg	SWE	1:24.4	21
11	Anti Saarepuu	EST	1:23.9	20
12	Peter Larsson	SWE	1:23.4	19

Tour de Ski standings

Rank	Name	Nation	Total time
1	Christoph Eigenmann	SUI	30.3''
2	Devon Kershaw	CAN	+13.7
3	Roddy Darragon	FRA	+23.4
4	Thobias Fredriksson	SWE	+25.6
5	Øystein Pettersen	NOR	+26.8
6	Simen Østensen	NOR	+28.5

Sprint standings

Rank	Name	Nation	Points
1	Christoph Eigenmann	SUI	50
2	Devon Kershaw	CAN	40
3	Roddy Darragon	FRA	30
4	Thobias Fredriksson	SWE	28
5	Petter Northug	NOR	26
6	Øystein Pettersen	NOR	25

== Stage 2: Pursuit Oberstdorf, 2 January ==
Women's event, 5 km classical + 5 km free

Bonus seconds earned during the race:

Seconds	Point 1	Finish
15	Aino-Kaisa Saarinen (FIN)	Kristin Størmer Steira (NOR)
10	Virpi Kuitunen (FIN)	Valentyna Shevchenko (UKR)
5	Marit Bjørgen (NOR)	Olga Zavyalova (RUS)

Rank	Name	Nation	Time
1	Kristin Størmer Steira	NOR	29:27.6
2	Valentyna Shevchenko	UKR	+13.3
3	Olga Zavyalova	RUS	+17.2
4	Kateřina Neumannová	CZE	+17.9
5	Riitta-Liisa Roponen	FIN	+18.8
6	Yuliya Chekalyova	RUS	+21.5
7	Karine Philippot	FRA	+22.8
8	Betty Ann Bjerkreim Nilsen	NOR	+22.9
9	Kine Beate Bjørnås	NOR	+23.4
10	Vibeke Skofterud	NOR	+27.3
11	Irina Artemova	RUS	+27.5
12	Marianna Longa	ITA	+28.0
21	Aino-Kaisa Saarinen	FIN	+47.6
22	Virpi Kuitunen	FIN	+48.5
25	Marit Bjørgen	NOR	+55.5
29	Arianna Follis	ITA	+1:00.1
33	Petra Majdič	SLO	+1:06.1
52	Chandra Crawford	CAN	+3:22.4

Tour de Ski standings

Rank	Name	Nation	Total time
1	Kristin Størmer Steira	NOR	30:53.9
2	Marit Bjørgen	NOR	+6.1
3	Aino-Kaisa Saarinen	FIN	+12.5
4	Kateřina Neumannová	CZE	+16.6
5	Claudia Künzel-Nystad	GER	+16.9
6	Valentyna Shevchenko	UKR	+18.0

Sprint standings

Rank	Name	Nation	Points
1	Marit Bjørgen	NOR	55
2	Aino-Kaisa Saarinen	FIN	43
3	Arianna Follis	ITA	40
4	Virpi Kuitunen	FIN	35
5	Chandra Crawford	CAN	30
6	Petra Majdič	SLO	26

Men's event, 10 km classical + 10 km free

Neither Christoph Eigenmann nor Roddy Darragon, number one and three in the overall standings before the race, finished, and were thus eliminated from the overall competition.

Bonus seconds earned during the race:

Seconds	Point 1	Finish
15	Simen Østensen (NOR)	Vincent Vittoz (FRA)
10	Björn Lind (SWE)	Alexander Legkov (RUS)
5	Sami Jauhojärvi (FIN)	Tobias Angerer (GER)

Rank	Name	Nation	Time
1	Vincent Vittoz	FRA	50:55.9
2	Alexander Legkov	RUS	+0.9
3	Tobias Angerer	GER	+2.5
4	Nikolay Pankratov	RUS	+3.1
5	Anders Södergren	SWE	+3.3
6	Yevgeny Dementyev	RUS	+3.4
7	Pietro Piller Cottrer	ITA	+3.7
8	Sergey Shiryayev	RUS	+5.4
9	Axel Teichmann	GER	+6.0
10	Mathias Fredriksson	SWE	+8.0
11	Jens Filbrich	GER	+9.6
12	Simen Østensen	NOR	+11.6
25	Devon Kershaw	CAN	+52.7
49	Øystein Pettersen	NOR	+2:09.1
69	Thobias Fredriksson	SWE	+4:26.7

Tour de Ski standings

Rank	Name	Nation	Total time
1	Simen Østensen	NOR	51:51.3
2	Vincent Vittoz	FRA	+14.4
3	Alexander Legkov	RUS	+23.6
4	Tobias Angerer	GER	+28.3
5	Yevgeny Dementyev	RUS	+33.6
6	Nikolay Pankratov	RUS	+33.7

Sprint standings

Rank	Name	Nation	Points
1	Devon Kershaw	CAN	40
2	Simen Østensen	NOR	39
3	Björn Lind	SWE	32
4	Thobias Fredriksson	SWE	28
5	Petter Northug	NOR	26
6	Øystein Pettersen	NOR	25

== Stage 3: Individual Start Oberstdorf, 3 January ==
Women's event, 10 km classical

Rank	Name	Nation	Time
1	Petra Majdič	SLO	28:44.8
2	Kristin Størmer Steira	NOR	+27.2
3	Virpi Kuitunen	FIN	+33.8
4	Valentyna Shevchenko	UKR	+37.1
5	Aino-Kaisa Saarinen	FIN	+37.9
6	Vibeke Skofterud	NOR	+38.3
7	Marianna Longa	ITA	+54.8
8	Viola Bauer	GER	+56.0
9	Evi Sachenbacher-Stehle	GER	+59.5
10	Kamila Rajdlová	CZE	+1:04.2
11	Marit Bjørgen	NOR	+1:05.0
12	Justyna Kowalczyk	POL	+1:11.7
17	Kateřina Neumannová	CZE	+1:37.4
26	Claudia Künzel-Nystad	GER	+2:09.2

Tour de Ski standings

Rank	Name	Nation	Total time
1	Kristin Størmer Steira	NOR	1:00:05.9
2	Petra Majdič	SLO	+20.4
3	Aino-Kaisa Saarinen	FIN	+23.2
4	Virpi Kuitunen	FIN	+26.4
5	Valentyna Shevchenko	UKR	+27.9
6	Vibeke Skofterud	NOR	+41.5

Sprint standings

Rank	Name	Nation	Points
1	Marit Bjørgen	NOR	55
2	Aino-Kaisa Saarinen	FIN	43
3	Arianna Follis	ITA	40
4	Virpi Kuitunen	FIN	35
5	Chandra Crawford	CAN	30
6	Petra Majdič	SLO	26

Men's event, 15 km classical

Rank	Name	Nation	Time
1	Franz Göring	GER	39:40.7
2	René Sommerfeldt	GER	+13.3
3	Tobias Angerer	GER	+30.0
4	Eldar Rønning	NOR	+30.4
5	Martin Bajčičák	SVK	+41.2
6	Reto Burgermeister	SUI	+50.0
7	Sami Jauhojärvi	FIN	+50.6
8	Petter Northug	NOR	+51.2
9	Mats Larsson	SWE	+52.5
10	Jean-Marc Gaillard	FRA	+52.9
11	Jens Arne Svartedal	NOR	+54.8
12	Roman Leybyuk	UKR	+59.4
13	Yevgeny Dementyev	RUS	+1:00.1
18	Simen Østensen	NOR	+1:15.3
27	Nikolay Pankratov	RUS	+1:31.6
44	Alexander Legkov	RUS	+2:15.2

Tour de Ski standings

Rank	Name	Nation	Total time
1	Tobias Angerer	GER	1:32.30.3
2	Simen Østensen	NOR	+17.0
3	Franz Göring	GER	+30.7
4	Yevgeny Dementyev	RUS	+35.4
5	Petter Northug	NOR	+42.8
6	Vincent Vittoz	FRA	+44.9

Sprint standings

Rank	Name	Nation	Points
1	Devon Kershaw	CAN	40
2	Simen Østensen	NOR	39
3	Björn Lind	SWE	32
4	Thobias Fredriksson	SWE	28
5	Petter Northug	NOR	26
6	Øystein Pettersen	NOR	25

== Stage 4: Sprint Asiago, 5 January ==
Women's event, 1.2 km

The listed times were achieved in the qualification race.

Final A

Rank	Name	Nation	Time	Bonus seconds
1	Virpi Kuitunen	FIN	2:39.1	50
2	Marit Bjørgen	NOR	2:39.9	40
3	Arianna Follis	ITA	2:42.9	30
4	Britta Norgren	SWE	2:44.1	28
5	Kateřina Neumannová	CZE	2:44.5	26
6	Natalya Korostelyova	RUS	2:45.2	25

Final B

Rank	Name	Nation	Time	Bonus seconds
7	Pirjo Manninen	FIN	2:44.4	24
8	Nicole Fessel	GER	2:47.1	23
9	Evi Sachenbacher-Stehle	GER	2:46.0	22
10	Riitta-Liisa Roponen	FIN	2:43.4	21
11	Claudia Künzel-Nystad	GER	2:40.9	20
12	Chandra Crawford	CAN	2:41.4	19

Eliminated before finals

Rank	Name	Nation	Time
27	Aino-Kaisa Saarinen	FIN	2:43.7
32	Valentyna Shevchenko	UKR	2:49.3
48	Kristin Størmer Steira	NOR	2:54.2

Tour de Ski standings

Rank	Name	Nation	Total time
1	Virpi Kuitunen	FIN	1:02.21.4
2	Marit Bjørgen	NOR	+28.3
3	Petra Majdič	SLO	+34.3
4	Kristin Størmer Steira	NOR	+38.7
5	Aino-Kaisa Saarinen	FIN	+47.4
6	Vibeke Skofterud	NOR	+55.6

Sprint standings

Rank	Name	Nation	Points
1	Marit Bjørgen	NOR	95
2	Virpi Kuitunen	FIN	85
3	Arianna Follis	ITA	70
4	Britta Norgren	SWE	50
5	Chandra Crawford	CAN	49
6	Pirjo Manninen	FIN	48

Men's event, 1.2 km

The listed times were achieved in the qualification race.

Final A

Rank	Name	Nation	Time	Bonus seconds
1	Tor Arne Hetland	NOR	2:21.5	50
2	Thobias Fredriksson	SWE	2:22.0	40
3	Petter Northug	NOR	2:24.4	30
4	Janusz Krężelok	POL	2:25.6	28
5	Marcus Hellner	SWE	2:24.3	26
6	Dušan Kožíšek	CZE	2:25.8	25

Final B

Rank	Name	Nation	Time	Bonus seconds
7	Nikolay Pankratov	RUS	2:23.3	24
8	Jörgen Brink	SWE	2:23.5	23
9	Yevgeny Dementyev	RUS	2:23.4	22
10	Björn Lind	SWE	2:21.4	21
11	Peter Larsson	SWE	2:23.6	20
12	Tobias Angerer	GER	2:24.7	19

Eliminated before finals

Rank	Name	Nation	Time
26	Simen Østensen	NOR	2:21.0
30	Vincent Vittoz	FRA	2:26.3
44	Alexander Legkov	RUS	2:28.6

Tour de Ski standings

Rank	Name	Nation	Total time
1	Tobias Angerer	GER	1:34:36.0
2	Simen Østensen	NOR	+27.3
3	Yevgeny Dementyev	RUS	+31.1
4	Petter Northug	NOR	+31.5
5	Franz Göring	GER	+46.9
6	Nikolay Pankratov	RUS	+1:00.6

Sprint standings

Rank	Name	Nation	Points
1	Tor Arne Hetland	NOR	73
2	Thobias Fredriksson	SWE	68
3	Petter Northug	NOR	56
4	Björn Lind	SWE	53
5	Simen Østensen	NOR	44
6	Marcus Hellner	SWE	44

== Stage 5: Mass Start Cavalese, Val di Fiemme, 6 January ==
The sprint jersey was awarded after this stage; Virpi Kuitunen of Finland earned 45 bonus points and won the women's black jersey, while Tor Arne Hetland from Norway successfully defended the men's jersey.

Women's event, 15 km

Bonus seconds earned during the race:

Seconds	Point 1	Point 2	Finish
15	Virpi Kuitunen (FIN)	Virpi Kuitunen (FIN)	Virpi Kuitunen (FIN)
10	Aino-Kaisa Saarinen (FIN)	Aino-Kaisa Saarinen (FIN)	Aino-Kaisa Saarinen (FIN)
5	Marit Bjørgen (NOR)	Marit Bjørgen (NOR)	Marit Bjørgen (NOR)

Rank	Name	Nation	Time
1	Virpi Kuitunen	FIN	42:02.2
2	Aino-Kaisa Saarinen	FIN	+37.1
3	Marit Bjørgen	NOR	+1:06.3
4	Vibeke Skofterud	NOR	+1:20.1
5	Justyna Kowalczyk	POL	+1:21.3
6	Viola Bauer	GER	+1:21.6
7	Kateřina Neumannová	CZE	+1:21.7
8	Evi Sachenbacher-Stehle	GER	+1:23.7
9	Petra Majdič	SLO	+1:26.0
10	Stefanie Böhler	GER	+1:40.3
11	Valentyna Shevchenko	UKR	+1:40.6
12	Marianna Longa	ITA	+1:45.3
20	Kristin Størmer Steira	NOR	+2:40.7

Tour de Ski standings

Rank	Name	Nation	Total time
1	Virpi Kuitunen	FIN	1:43:38.6
2	Aino-Kaisa Saarinen	FIN	+1:39.5
3	Marit Bjørgen	NOR	+2:09.8
4	Petra Majdič	SLO	+2:40.3
5	Vibeke Skofterud	NOR	+3:00.7
6	Evi Sachenbacher-Stehle	GER	+3:09.5

Sprint standings

Rank	Name	Nation	Points
1	Virpi Kuitunen	FIN	130
2	Marit Bjørgen	NOR	105
3	Aino-Kaisa Saarinen	FIN	77
4	Arianna Follis	ITA	70
5	Britta Norgren	SWE	50
6	Chandra Crawford	CAN	49

Men's event, 30 km

Bonus seconds earned during the race:

Seconds	Point 1	Point 2	Finish
15	Sergey Shiryayev (RUS)	Simen Østensen (NOR)	Eldar Rønning (NOR)
10	Frode Estil (NOR)	Frode Estil (NOR)	Ivan Alypov (RUS)
5	Eldar Rønning (NOR)	Eldar Rønning (NOR)	Sami Jauhojärvi (FIN)

Rank	Name	Nation	Time
1	Eldar Rønning	NOR	1:21:30.0
2	Ivan Alypov	RUS	+0.6
3	Sami Jauhojärvi	FIN	+1.6
4	Tor Arne Hetland	NOR	+3.8
5	Tobias Angerer	GER	+4.2
6	Frode Estil	NOR	+5.1
7	Simen Østensen	NOR	+7.1
8	Petter Northug	NOR	+11.1
9	Jiří Magál	CZE	+11.7
10	Alexander Legkov	RUS	+13.9
11	Jens Filbrich	GER	+15.4
12	Franz Göring	GER	+34.1
19	Nikolay Pankratov	RUS	+1:21.7
22	Yevgeny Dementyev	RUS	+1:49.2

Tour de Ski standings

Rank	Name	Nation	Total time
1	Tobias Angerer	GER	1:34:36.0
2	Simen Østensen	NOR	+15.2
3	Petter Northug	NOR	+38.4
4	Tor Arne Hetland	NOR	+1:05.8
5	Franz Göring	GER	+1:15.8
6	Sami Jauhojärvi	FIN	+1:16.9

Sprint standings

Rank	Name	Nation	Points
1	Tor Arne Hetland	NOR	73
2	Thobias Fredriksson	SWE	68
3	Simen Østensen	NOR	59
4	Petter Northug	NOR	56
5	Björn Lind	SWE	53
6	Marcus Hellner	SWE	44

== Stage 6: Final Climb Cavalese, Val di Fiemme, 7 January ==
Athletes started in order of the aggregate standings, and the first athlete to reach the finish won. After the first 15 athletes, the remainder were released in a "wave start" five minutes behind Kuitunen, the leader, but their total time behind Kuitunen was added to the final time.

Women's event, 10 km

Rank	Name	Nation	Stage time	Stage rank	Total time
1	Virpi Kuitunen	FIN	36:36.7	31	2:20.15.3
2	Marit Bjørgen	NOR	35:44.4	16	+1:17.5
3	Valentyna Shevchenko	UKR	34:30.2	3	+1:20.8
4	Aino-Kaisa Saarinen	FIN	36:19.0	24	+1:21.8
5	Kateřina Neumannová	CZE	34:24.0	1	+1:23.8
6	Petra Majdič	SLO	35:48.4	17	+1:52.0
7	Kristin Størmer Steira	NOR	34:25.3	2	+1:53.8
8	Evi Sachenbacher-Stehle	GER	35:25.4	10	+1:58.2
9	Vibeke Skofterud	NOR	35:59.7	20	+2:23.7
10	Viola Bauer	GER	35:18.8	9	+2:41.5
11	Justyna Kowalczyk	POL	35:33.1	13	+3:08.5
12	Karine Philippot	FRA	34:56.2	6	+3:20.4
13	Riitta-Liisa Roponen	FIN	35:39.2	14	+3:22.0
14	Olga Zavyalova	RUS	35:27.0	11	+3:36.0
15	Marianna Longa	ITA	36:32.7	29	+3:41.1
Top stage times
34	Yevgeniya Medvedeva-Arbuzova	RUS	34:44.7	4	
18	Sabina Valbusa	ITA	34:50.7	5	
30	Oxana Yatskaya	KAZ	34:56.2	7	
35	Svetlana Malahova	KAZ	35:28.8	12	

Men's event, 11 km

A wave start was also employed in the men's event, but the first 30 started according to the time differences in the overall Tour standings. The remainder started six minutes behind Angerer.

Rank	Name	Nation	Stage time	Stage rank	Total time
1	Tobias Angerer	GER	33:39.5	18	3:29:49.7
2	Alexander Legkov	RUS	32:12.8	2	+46.4
3	Simen Østensen	NOR	34:14.5	33	+50.2
4	Petter Northug	NOR	34:08.1	30	+1:07.0
5	Tor Arne Hetland	NOR	33:43.1	20	+1:09.4
6	Franz Göring	GER	33:41.4	19	+1:18.7
7	Sami Jauhojärvi	FIN	33:46.9	22	+1:24.3
8	Yevgeny Dementyev	RUS	32:55.6	7	+1:32.2
9	Jens Filbrich	GER	33:36.6	16	+1:34.8
10	Nikolay Pankratov	RUS	33:07.5	9	+1:46.1
11	Frode Estil	NOR	34:12.8	32	+1:56.9
12	Sergey Shiryayev	RUS	32:08.4	1	+2:18.5
13	Jiří Magál	CZE	33:46.0	21	+2:38.1
14	Mathias Fredriksson	SWE	33:30.8	14	+2:53.9
15	René Sommerfeldt	GER	32:54.0	5	+3:05.2
Top stage times
20	Giorgio Di Centa	ITA	32:49.7	3	
26	Emmanuel Jonnier	FRA	32:51.8	4	
34	Martin Bajčičák	SVK	32:55.3	6	
32	Christian Hoffmann	AUT	32:56.8	8	
36	Jean-Marc Gaillard	FRA	33:12.7	10	
19	Vincent Vittoz	FRA	33:23.9	11	
16	Anders Södergren	SWE	33:28.3	12	

== See also ==
- 2007 in cross-country skiing
