= Cross-country skiing at the 2010 Winter Olympics – Men's 50 kilometre classical =

Men's 50 kilometre classical at the XXI Olympic Winter Games
- Pictogram for cross country
- Venue: Whistler Olympic Park
- Dates: 28 February 2010
- Competitors: 55 from 22 nations
- Winning time: 2:05:35.5

Medalists
1st place, gold medalist(s)		Petter Northug	Norway
2nd place, silver medalist(s)		Axel Teichmann	Germany
3rd place, bronze medalist(s)		Johan Olsson	Sweden

The men's 50 kilometre classical cross-country skiing competition at the 2010 Winter Olympics in Vancouver, Canada was held on 28 February at Whistler Olympic Park in Whistler, British Columbia at 09:30 PST. on the final day of the Games.

The 50 kilometre has been skated as a mass start event at the World Championships since 2005 and since the 2006 Winter Olympics. Italy's Giorgio Di Centa was the defending Olympic champion though that event was held in the freestyle technique. Norway's Petter Northug was the reigning world champion though that was also in the freestyle technique. The last World Cup event in the 50 km classical took place in Trondheim, Norway on 14 March 2009 and was won by Sami Jauhojärvi of Finland. All three medalists of the shorter 30 kilometre event were scheduled to participate in the 50 km race; in that race, Marcus Hellner of Sweden came first, Petter Northug was 11th, Giorgio Di Centa was 12th, and Sami Jauhojärvi failed to finish.

== Results ==
There were 55 participants in this event.

Defending Olympic champion di Centa finished 11th. Jauhojärvi finished 20th. At the 12.3 km mark, the top three were Södergren (who finished ninth), 2007 champion Hjelmeset (who finished 17th), and Legkov (who finished 14th). By the halfway mark, the top three were Johnsrud Sundby (who finished 15th), Richardsson (who finished seventh), and Olsson. France's Gaillard (who finished 19th) led at the 39.2 km mark, followed by Cologna (who finished tenth), and Legkov. Northug's 0.3 second victory over Teichmann is the closest 50 km event in Olympic history, beating the previous record of 0.8 seconds set at the previous Olympics when di Centa edged out Russia's Yevgeny Dementyev. Additionally, he is the sixth Norwegian to win the Olympic 50 km event, but the first since Bjørn Dæhlie's second triumph at the 1998 Winter Olympics in Nagano. The medals were presented at the closing ceremony at BC Place Stadium in Vancouver that same evening.

Rank	Bib	Name	Country	Time	Deficit
1st place, gold medalist(s)	1	Petter Northug	Norway	2:05:35.5	+0.0
2nd place, silver medalist(s)	6	Axel Teichmann	Germany	2:05:35.8	+0.3
3rd place, bronze medalist(s)	18	Johan Olsson	Sweden	2:05:36.5	+1.0
4	19	Tobias Angerer	Germany	2:05:37.0	+1.5
5	28	Devon Kershaw	Canada	2:05:37.1	+1.6
6	24	Andrus Veerpalu	Estonia	2:05:41.6	+6.1
7	14	Daniel Rickardsson	Sweden	2:05:45.2	+9.7
8	12	Maxim Vylegzhanin	Russia	2:05:46.4	+10.9
9	29	Anders Södergren	Sweden	2:05:47.1	+11.6
10	4	Dario Cologna	Switzerland	2:05:47.5	+12.0
11	5	Giorgio Di Centa	Italy	2:05:49.0	+13.5
12	3	Lukáš Bauer	Czech Republic	2:05:49.4	+13.9
13	10	Vincent Vittoz	France	2:05:49.6	+14.1
14	8	Alexander Legkov	Russia	2:05:53.3	+17.8
15	20	Martin Johnsrud Sundby	Norway	2:05:57.7	+22.2
16	13	Jens Filbrich	Germany	2:06:07.8	+32.3
17	38	Odd-Bjørn Hjelmeset	Norway	2:06:08.3	+32.8
18	36	George Grey	Canada	2:06:18.1	+42.6
19	9	Jean Marc Gaillard	France	2:06:38.0	+1:02.5
20	23	Sami Jauhojärvi	Finland	2:06:43.2	+1:07.7
21	7	René Sommerfeldt	Germany	2:06:52.5	+1:17.0
22	2	Marcus Hellner	Sweden	2:07:03.2	+1:27.7
23	27	Jens Arne Svartedal	Norway	2:07:32.5	+1:57.0
24	39	Petr Sedov	Russia	2:07:35.4	+1:59.9
25	26	Sergei Dolidovich	Belarus	2:07:47.6	+2:12.1
26	11	Pietro Piller Cottrer	Italy	2:08:21.6	+2:46.1
27	30	Alexey Poltaranin	Kazakhstan	2:09:29.6	+3:54.1
28	44	James Southam	United States	2:10:08.3	+4:32.8
29	33	Jiří Magál	Czech Republic	2:10:22.7	+4:47.2
30	35	Jaak Mae	Estonia	2:10:41.3	+5:05.8
31	16	Valerio Checchi	Italy	2:10:49.7	+5:14.2
32	22	Alex Harvey	Canada	2:10:49.9	+5:14.4
33	17	Ivan Babikov	Canada	2:10:50.2	+5:14.7
34	34	Aivar Rehemaa	Estonia	2:10:57.6	+5:22.1
35	40	Nobu Naruse	Japan	2:10:59.2	+5:23.7
36	32	Roland Clara	Italy	2:11:00.8	+5:25.3
37	31	Ville Nousiainen	Finland	2:11:38.0	+6:02.5
38	55	Cyril Miranda	France	2:11:56.9	+6:21.4
39	45	Yevgeniy Velichko	Kazakhstan	2:13:01.5	+7:26.0
40	48	Vicenc Vilarrubla	Spain	2:13:33.8	+7:58.3
41	50	Algo Kärp	Estonia	2:13:49.6	+8:14.1
42	47	Roman Leybyuk	Ukraine	2:15:19.9	+9:44.4
43	42	Lari Lehtonen	Finland	2:16:26.2	+10:50.7
44	49	Diego Ruiz	Spain	2:17:49.8	+12:14.3
45	46	Aliaksei Ivanou	Belarus	2:17:59.2	+12:23.7
46	53	Benjamin Koons	New Zealand	2:21:53.9	+16:18.4
47	52	Francesc Soulie	Andorra	2:25:00.8	+19:25.3
48	54	Jonas Thor Olsen	Denmark	2:25:00.9	+19:25.4
	25	Martin Bajčičák	Slovakia	DNF	
	21	Kris Freeman	United States	DNF	
	43	Ivan Bátory	Slovakia	DNF	
	15	Sergey Shiryayev	Russia	DNF	
	51	Javier Gutierrez	Spain	DNF	
	37	Sergey Cherepanov	Kazakhstan	DNS	
	41	Paul Constantin Pepene	Romania	DNS	
