= FIS Nordic World Ski Championships 2009 – Men's 15 kilometre classical =

Men's 15 km classical interval start at the FIS Nordic World Ski Championships 2009
- Venue: Liberec
- Date: 20 February 2009
- Competitors: 75 from 30 nations
- Winning time: 38:54.4

Medalists
gold medal	Andrus Veerpalu	Estonia
silver medal	Lukas Bauer	Czech Republic
bronze medal	Matti Heikkinen	Finland

The Men's 15 km classical interval start was part of the FIS Nordic World Ski Championships 2009's events held in Liberec, Czech Republic. The race went underway on 20 February 2009 at 13:00 CET. A 10 km qualifying race took place on 23 February at 11:00 CET. The defending world champion was Norway's Lars Berger

== Results ==
Rank	Bib	Athlete	Country	Time	Deficit
1st place, gold medalist(s)	36	Andrus Veerpalu	Estonia	38:54.4	—
2nd place, silver medalist(s)	48	Lukáš Bauer	Czech Republic	39:00.7	+6.3
3rd place, bronze medalist(s)	38	Matti Heikkinen	Finland	39:10.8	+16.4
4	21	Kris Freeman	United States	39:12.1	+17.7
5	35	Jaak Mae	Estonia	39:25.1	+30.7
6	50	Dario Cologna	Switzerland	39:27.7	+33.3
7	41	Eldar Rønning	Norway	39:35.6	+41.2
8	46	Johan Olsson	Sweden	39:36.5	+42.1
9	39	Tobias Angerer	Germany	39:44.9	+50.5
10	15	Martin Bajčičák	Slovakia	39:51.9	+57.5
11	9	Franz Göring	Germany	39:52.7	+58.3
12	43	Sami Jauhojärvi	Finland	39:52.8	+58.4
13	34	Jens Filbrich	Germany	39:56.2	+1:01.8
14	44	Jean Marc Gaillard	France	39:59.0	+1:04.6
15	22	Odd-Bjørn Hjelmeset	Norway	39:59.6	+1:05.2
16	13	Alexey Poltoranin	Kazakhstan	39:59.9	+1:05.5
17	11	Ivan Batory	Slovakia	40:13.2	+1:18.8
18	37	Anders Södergren	Sweden	40:13.9	+1:19.5
19	32	Vasily Rochev	Russia	40:20.0	+1:25.6
20	16	Daniel Rickardsson	Sweden	40:20.2	+1:25.8
21	10	George Grey	Canada	40:20.6	+1:26.2
22	25	Martin Jakš	Czech Republic	40:24.7	+1:30.3
23	42	Vincent Vittoz	France	40:26.3	+1:31.9
24	28	Valerio Checchi	Italy	40:31.7	+1:37.3
25	14	Sergey Novikov	Russia	40:34.8	+1:40.4
26	30	Toni Livers	Switzerland	40:37.3	+1:42.9
27	12	Alexandre Rousselet	France	40:41.8	+1:47.4
27	29	Roland Clara	Italy	40:41.8	+1:47.4
29	45	Petter Northug	Norway	40:55.1	+2:00.7
30	24	Jiří Magál	Czech Republic	41:01.0	+2:06.6
31	17	Mathias Fredriksson	Sweden	41:01.7	+2:07.3
32	20	Sergey Cherepanov	Kazakhstan	41:04.6	+2:10.2
33	8	Giovanni Gullo	Italy	41:15.5	+2:21.1
34	47	Martin Johnsrud Sundby	Norway	41:17.5	+2:23.1
35	4	Roman Leybyuk	Ukraine	41:17.8	+2:23.4
36	6	Alex Harvey	Canada	41:19.4	+2:25.0
37	40	Devon Kershaw	Canada	41:23.1	+2:28.7
38	49	Axel Teichmann	Germany	41:26.5	+2:32.1
39	33	Aivar Rehemaa	Estonia	41:38.0	+2:43.6
40	1	Maciej Kreczmer	Poland	41:49.2	+2:54.8
41	19	Christophe Perillat	France	41:51.3	+2:56.9
42	58	Olexandr Putsko	Ukraine	42:03.1	+3:08.7
43	23	Alexander Kuznetsov	Russia	42:05.4	+3:11.0
44	53	Shohei Honda	Japan	42:06.8	+3:12.4
45	27	Maxim Vylegzhanin	Russia	42:11.5	+3:17.1
46	51	Manuel Hirner	Austria	42:19.9	+3:25.5
47	3	Yevgeniy Velichko	Kazakhstan	42:25.2	+3:30.8
48	55	Vicente Vilarrubla	Spain	42:33.3	+3:38.9
49	57	James Southam	United States	42:37.8	+3:43.4
50	7	Reto Burgermeister	Switzerland	42:40.7	+3:46.3
51	60	Ben Sim	Australia	42:45.5	+3:51.1
52	62	Chris Cook	United States	42:49.7	+3:55.3
53	56	Veselin Tzinzov	Bulgaria	42:55.6	+4:01.2
54	52	Chris Butler	Canada	43:00.0	+4:05.6
55	54	Vitaly Shtun	Ukraine	43:02.9	+4:08.5
56	64	Andrew Musgrave	United Kingdom	43:15.6	+4:21.2
57	5	Algo Kärp	Estonia	43:26.6	+4:32.2
58	18	David Hofer	Italy	43:37.0	+4:42.6
59	31	Nikolay Chebotko	Kazakhstan	43:38.7	+4:44.3
60	2	Alexander Lasutkin	Belarus	43:46.2	+4:51.8
61	59	Yuichi Onda	Japan	43:50.9	+4:56.5
62	63	Francesc Soulie	Andorra	44:01.2	+5:06.8
63	68	Jonas Thor Olsen	Denmark	44:25.6	+5:31.2
64	61	Paul Constantin Pepene	Romania	44:27.8	+5:33.4
65	74	Sebastian Sørensen	Denmark	44:56.4	+6:02.0
66	69	Wenlong Xu	China	44:58.4	+6:04.0
67	66	Javier Gutiérrez	Spain	45:35.0	+6:40.6
68	70	Callum Watson	Australia	45:35.3	+6:40.9
69	71	Arvis Liepins	New Zealand	46:15.5	+7:21.1
70	67	Andrew Mock	Australia	46:32.4	+7:38.0
71	73	Asger Fischer Mølgaard	Denmark	47:30.3	+8:35.9
72	72	Ivan Burgov	Bulgaria	49:20.7	+10:26.3
73	65	Mantas Strolia	Lithuania	50:29.1	+11:34.7
—	26	Ville Nousiainen	Finland	DNF	—
—	75	Aigars Kalnups	Latvia	DNF	—

== Qualification ==
Rank	Bib	Athlete	Country	Time	Deficit	Notes
1	52	Wenlong Xu	China	31:22.9	—	Q
2	53	Jonas Thor Olsen	Denmark	31:44.5	+21.6	Q
3	32	Sebastian Sørensen	Denmark	31:57.4	+34.5	Q
4	54	Andrew Mock	Australia	32:12.0	+49.1	Q
5	51	Callum Watson	Australia	32:28.1	+1:05.2	Q
6	56	Javier Gutiérrez	Spain	32:35.5	+1:12.6	Q
7	40	Ivan Burgov	Bulgaria	32:44.3	+1:21.4	Q
8	45	Arvis Liepins	Latvia	32:56.5	+1:33.6	Q
9	19	Aigars Kalnups	Latvia	33:00.5	+1:37.6	Q
10	39	Asger Fischer Moelgaard	Denmark	33:01.2	+1:38.3	Q
11	37	Jun-Gil Lee	South Korea	33:02.9	+1:40.0	
12	35	Artem Rojin	Kyrgyzstan	33:16.1	+1:53.2	
13	16	Janis Paipals	Latvia	33:23.4	+2:00.5	
14	38	Ulrich Ghisler	Denmark	33:24.0	+2:01.1	
15	48	Nick Grimmer	Australia	33:25.6	+2:02.7	
	...	...	...	...	...	
55	6	Cear Baena	Venezuela	1:08:10.6	+36:47.7	
—	34	Alexander Standen	United Kingdom	DNS	—	
