= Christoph Eigenmann =

Swiss cross country skier

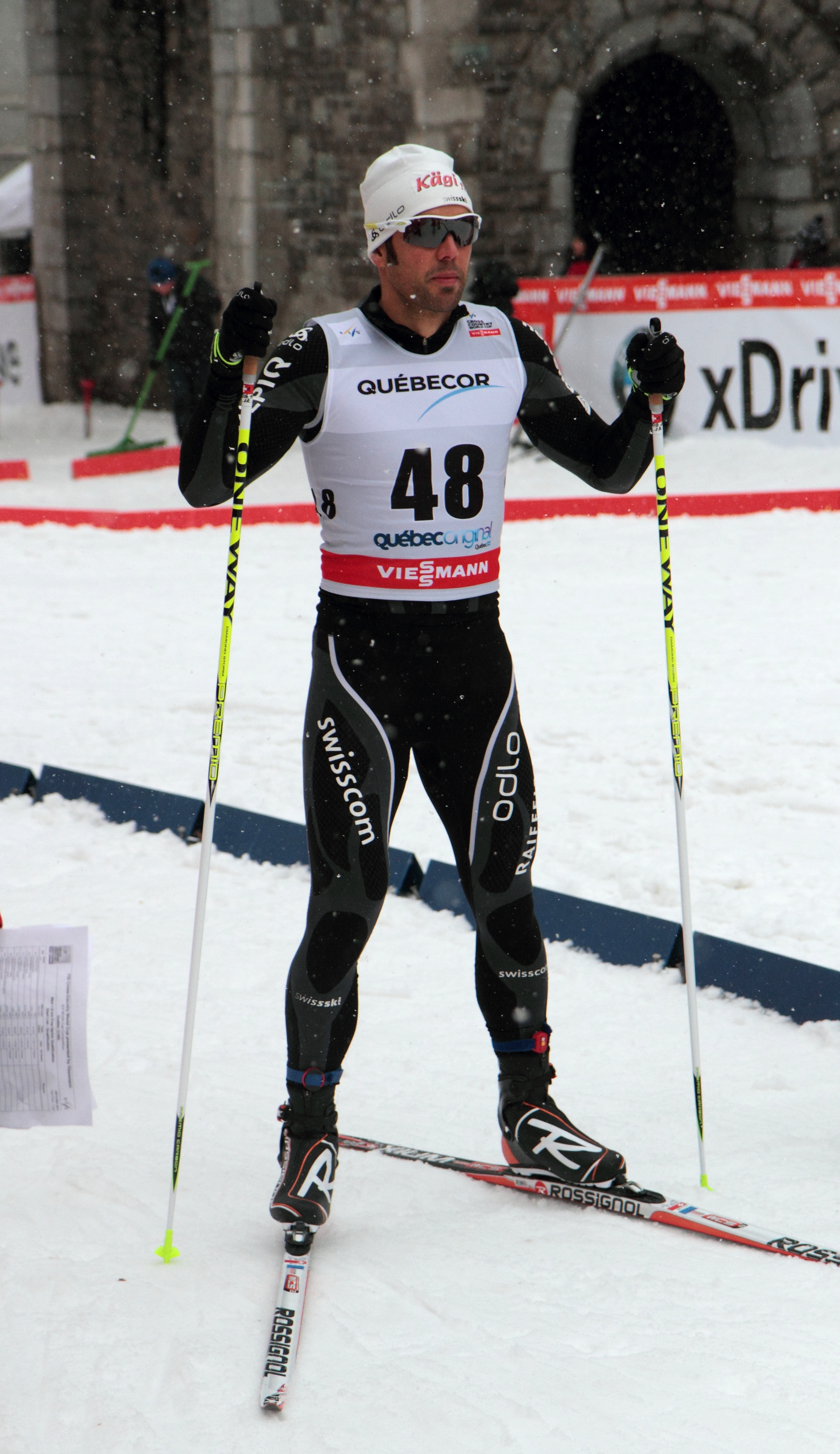

Personal information
- Nationality: Switzerland
- Born: 22 May 1979 (age 47) Wattwil, Switzerland

Sport
- Sport: Skiing
- Club: SC Gardes Frontières

World Cup career
- Seasons: 2000–2014
- Indiv. starts: 83
- Indiv. podiums: 2
- Indiv. wins: 1
- Team starts: 16
- Team podiums: 0
- Overall titles: 0 – (27th in 2006)
- Discipline titles: 0

Christoph Eigenmann (born 22 May 1979) is a Swiss cross-country skier who has competed between 1998 and 2013. He won his only World Cup victory on 31 December 2006, when he won the first stage in the inaugural edition of the Tour de Ski, a sprint freestyle. His first World Cup podium was a second place in sprint freestyle in Changchun, China on 15 March 2006.

Eigenmann also competed in three Winter Olympics, earning his best finish of 15th in the team sprint event at Turin in 2006. His best finish at the FIS Nordic World Ski Championships was 12th in the team sprint event at Sapporo in 2007.

== Cross-country skiing results ==
All results are sourced from the International Ski Federation (FIS).

=== Olympic Games ===
Year	Age	15 km individual	Pursuit	30 km mass start	50 km	Sprint	4 × 10 km relay	Team sprint
2002	22	—	—	—	—	18	—	—N/a
2006	26	—	—	—N/a	—	30	—	15
2010	30	—	—	—N/a	—	34	—	—

=== World Championships ===
Year	Age	15 km individual	Pursuit	30 km mass start	50 km	Sprint	4 × 10 km relay	Team sprint
2003	23	—	—	—	—	28	—	—N/a
2005	25	—	—	—N/a	—	29	—	19
2007	27	—	—	—N/a	—	33	—	12
2009	29	—	—	—N/a	—	—	—	16
2011	31	—	—	—N/a	—	40	—	16

=== World Cup ===
==== Season standings ====
Season	Age	Discipline standings					Ski Tour standings		
Season	Age	Overall	Distance	Long Distance	Middle Distance	Sprint	Nordic Opening	Tour de Ski	World Cup Final
2000	20	NC	—N/a	—	—	NC	—N/a	—N/a	—N/a
2001	21	NC	—N/a	—N/a	—N/a	NC	—N/a	—N/a	—N/a
2002	22	102	—N/a	—N/a	—N/a	49	—N/a	—N/a	—N/a
2003	23	77	—N/a	—N/a	—N/a	40	—N/a	—N/a	—N/a
2004	24	NC	—	—N/a	—N/a	NC	—N/a	—N/a	—N/a
2005	25	40	—	—N/a	—N/a	17	—N/a	—N/a	—N/a
2006	26	27	—	—N/a	—N/a	10	—N/a	—N/a	—N/a
2007	27	84	NC	—N/a	—N/a	40	—N/a	DNF	—N/a
2008	28	59	—	—N/a	—N/a	23	—N/a	—	—
2009	29	116	—	—N/a	—N/a	64	—N/a	—	—
2010	30	104	—	—N/a	—N/a	51	—N/a	—	—
2011	31	75	—	—N/a	—N/a	35	—	—	—
2012	32	113	—	—N/a	—N/a	62	DNF	—	—
2013	33	134	—	—N/a	—N/a	80	—	—	—
2014	34	NC	—	—N/a	—N/a	NC	—	—	—

==== Individual podiums ====
- 1 victory – (1 SWC)
- 2 podiums – (1 WC, 1 SWC)

No.	Season	Date	Location	Race	Level	Place
1	2005–06	15 March 2006	Changchun, China	1.0 km Sprint F	World Cup	2nd
2	2006–07	31 December 2006	Munich, Germany	1.2 km Sprint F	Stage World Cup	1st
