= 2006–07 FIS Cross-Country World Cup =

Cross-country skiing competition

Discipline	Men	Women
Overall	(Germany) Tobias Angerer (2nd title)	(Finland) Virpi Kuitunen
Distance	(Germany) Tobias Angerer	(Finland) Virpi Kuitunen
Sprint	(Norway) Jens Arne Svartedal	(Finland) Virpi Kuitunen
Nations Cup	Norway	Finland
- Nations Cup Overall: Norway

Stage events
Tour de Ski	(Germany) Tobias Angerer	(Finland) Virpi Kuitunen

Competition
Locations	18 venues	18 venues
Individual	25 events	25 events
Relay/Team	5 events	5 events
Cancelled	3 events	3 events

The 2006–07 FIS Cross-Country World Cup was a multi-race tournament over a season for cross-country skiers. It was the 26th official World Cup season in cross-country skiing for men and women. The season began on 28 October 2006 with 800m sprint races for women in Düsseldorf which was eventually won by Marit Bjørgen of Norway. This season, Tour de Ski was a part of the World Cup for the first time. The World Cup is organised by the FIS who also run world cups and championships in ski jumping, snowboarding and alpine skiing amongst others.

== Calendar ==
Both men's and women's events tend to be held at the same resorts over a 2 or 3 day period. Listed below is a list of races which equates with the points table further down this page.

The Tour de Ski is a series of events which count towards the World Cup. The inaugural Tour de Ski was supposed to start with the meet at Nové Město, but due to lack of snow the first two events were cancelled. The 1st Tour the Ski started in München and concluded at Val di Fiemme.

=== Men ===
Key: C – Classic / F – Freestyle
WC	Stage	Date	Place	Discipline	Winner	Second	Third	Yellow bib	Ref.
1	1	28 October 2006	(Germany) Düsseldorf	Sprint F	(Norway) Eldar Rønning	(Norway) Øystein Pettersen	(Norway) Tor Arne Hetland	(Norway) Eldar Rønning	
2	2	18 November 2006	(Sweden) Gällivare	15 km F	(Norway) Ole Einar Bjørndalen	(Norway) Tore Ruud Hofstad	(Germany) Franz Göring	(Norway) Ole Einar Bjørndalen (Norway) Eldar Rønning	
3	3	25 November 2006	(Finland) Ruka	Sprint C	(Norway) Jens Arne Svartedal	(Norway) Odd-Bjørn Hjelmeset	(Norway) Tor Arne Hetland	(Norway) Eldar Rønning	
4	4	26 November 2006	(Finland) Ruka	15 km C	(Norway) Eldar Rønning	(France) Vincent Vittoz	(Sweden) Anders Södergren	(Norway) Eldar Rønning	
		8 December 2006	(Italy) Aosta	Sprint F	cancelled, rescheduled to Rybinsk (21 Jan)				
		10 December 2006	(Italy) Aosta	30 km C Mass Start	cancelled				
5	5	13 December 2006	(Italy) Cogne/Val d'Aosta	15 km C	(Norway) Eldar Rønning	(Norway) Tor Arne Hetland	(Russia) Yevgeny Dementyev	(Norway) Eldar Rønning	
6	6	16 December 2006	(France) La Clusaz	30 km F Mass Start	(Germany) Tobias Angerer	(Russia) Alexander Legkov	(Russia) Yevgeny Dementyev	(Norway) Eldar Rønning	
		29 December 2006	(Czech Republic) Nové Město	4.5 km C Prologue	cancelled due to lack of snow, not rescheduled				
		30 December 2006	(Czech Republic) Nové Město	15 km F Pursuit	cancelled due to lack of snow, not rescheduled				
	7	31 December 2006	(Germany) Munich	Sprint F	(Switzerland) Christoph Eigenmann	(Canada) Devon Kershaw	(France) Roddy Darragon	(Norway) Eldar Rønning	
	8	2 January 2007	(Germany) Oberstdorf	10 km C + 10 km F Double Pursuit	(France) Vincent Vittoz	(Russia) Alexander Legkov	(Germany) Tobias Angerer	(Norway) Eldar Rønning	
	9	3 January 2007	(Germany) Oberstdorf	15 km C	(Germany) Franz Göring	(Germany) René Sommerfeldt	(Germany) Tobias Angerer	(Norway) Eldar Rønning	
	10	5 January 2007	(Italy) Asiago	Sprint F	(Norway) Tor Arne Hetland	(Sweden) Thobias Fredriksson	(Norway) Petter Northug	(Norway) Eldar Rønning	
	11	6 January 2007	(Italy) Val di Fiemme	30 km C Mass Start	(Norway) Eldar Rønning	(Russia) Ivan Alypov	(Finland) Sami Jauhojärvi	(Norway) Eldar Rønning	
	12	7 January 2007	(Italy) Val di Fiemme	11 km F Pursuit; Final Climb	(Russia) Sergey Shiryayev	(Russia) Alexander Legkov	(Italy) Giorgio Di Centa	(Norway) Eldar Rønning	
7	1st Tour de Ski Overall (29 December 2006 – 7 January 2007)				(Germany) Tobias Angerer	(Russia) Alexander Legkov	(Norway) Simen Østensen	(Germany) Tobias Angerer	
8	13	20 January 2007	(Russia) Rybinsk	30 km F Mass Start	(Russia) Alexander Legkov	(France) Emmanuel Jonnier	(Germany) Tobias Angerer	(Germany) Tobias Angerer	
9	14	21 January 2007	(Russia) Rybinsk	Sprint F	(Italy) Renato Pasini	(Russia) Nikolay Pankratov	(Germany) Tobias Angerer	(Germany) Tobias Angerer	
10	15	27 January 2007	(Estonia) Otepää	15 km C	(Germany) Axel Teichmann	(Norway) Frode Estil	(Norway) Odd-Bjørn Hjelmeset	(Germany) Tobias Angerer	
11	16	28 January 2007	(Estonia) Otepää	Sprint C	(Norway) Jens Arne Svartedal	(Russia) Vasily Rochev	(United States) Torin Koos	(Germany) Tobias Angerer	
12	17	3 February 2007	(Switzerland) Davos	15 km F	(France) Vincent Vittoz (Switzerland) Toni Livers	Not awarded	(Austria) Christian Hoffmann	(Germany) Tobias Angerer	
13	18	15 February 2007	(China) Changchun	Sprint C	(Norway) Ola Vigen Hattestad	(Norway) Børre Næss	(Norway) Tor Arne Hetland	(Germany) Tobias Angerer	
14	19	16 February 2007	(China) Changchun	15 km F	(Germany) Tobias Angerer	(France) Vincent Vittoz	(France) Emmanuel Jonnier	(Germany) Tobias Angerer	
FIS Nordic World Ski Championships 2007 (22 February–4 March)
15	20	10 March 2007	(Finland) Lahti	Sprint F	(Norway) Petter Northug	(Norway) Jens Arne Svartedal	(Norway) Eldar Rønning	(Germany) Tobias Angerer	
16	21	11 March 2007	(Finland) Lahti	15 km C	(Norway) Odd-Bjørn Hjelmeset	(Norway) Eldar Rønning	(Germany) Tobias Angerer	(Germany) Tobias Angerer	
17	22	14 March 2007	(Norway) Drammen	Sprint C	(Norway) Børre Næss	(Sweden) Mats Larsson	(Norway) Trond Iversen	(Germany) Tobias Angerer	
18	23	17 March 2007	(Norway) Oslo	50 km C	(Norway) Odd-Bjørn Hjelmeset	(Germany) Tobias Angerer	(Norway) Frode Estil	(Germany) Tobias Angerer	
19	24	21 March 2007	(Sweden) Stockholm	Sprint C	(Russia) Mikhail Devyatyarov	(Sweden) Emil Jönsson	(Sweden) Mats Larsson	(Germany) Tobias Angerer	
20	25	24 March 2007	(Sweden) Falun	15 km C + 15 km F Double Pursuit	(Germany) Tobias Angerer	(Sweden) Mathias Fredriksson	(France) Emmanuel Jonnier	(Germany) Tobias Angerer	

=== Women ===
Key: C – Classic / F – Freestyle
WC	Stage	Date	Place	Discipline	Winner	Second	Third	Yellow bib	Ref.
1	1	28 October 2006	(Germany) Düsseldorf	Sprint F	(Norway) Marit Bjørgen	(Russia) Natalya Matveyeva	(Norway) Ella Gjømle	(Norway) Marit Bjørgen	
2	2	18 November 2006	(Sweden) Gällivare	10 km F	(Czech Republic) Kateřina Neumannová	(Estonia) Kristina Šmigun	(Norway) Marit Bjørgen	(Norway) Marit Bjørgen	
3	3	25 November 2006	(Finland) Ruka	Sprint C	(Slovenia) Petra Majdič	(Finland) Virpi Kuitunen	(Norway) Marit Bjørgen	(Norway) Marit Bjørgen	
4	4	26 November 2006	(Finland) Ruka	10 km C	(Finland) Virpi Kuitunen	(Norway) Marit Bjørgen	(Estonia) Kristina Šmigun	(Norway) Marit Bjørgen	
		9 December 2006	(Italy) Aosta	Sprint F	cancelled, rescheduled to Rybinsk (21 Jan)				
		10 December 2006	(Italy) Aosta	15 km C Mass Start	cancelled				
5	5	13 December 2006	(Italy) Cogne/Val d'Aosta	10 km C	(Finland) Virpi Kuitunen	(Slovenia) Petra Majdič	(Finland) Aino-Kaisa Saarinen	(Finland) Virpi Kuitunen	
6	6	16 December 2006	(France) La Clusaz	15 km F Mass Start	(Finland) Virpi Kuitunen	(Finland) Riitta-Liisa Roponen	(Italy) Arianna Follis	(Finland) Virpi Kuitunen	
		29 December 2006	(Czech Republic) Nové Město	3 km C Prologue	cancelled due to lack of snow, not rescheduled				
		30 December 2006	(Czech Republic) Nové Město	10 km F Pursuit	cancelled due to lack of snow, not rescheduled				
	7	31 December 2006	(Germany) Munich	Sprint F	(Norway) Marit Bjørgen	(Italy) Arianna Follis	(Canada) Chandra Crawford	(Finland) Virpi Kuitunen	
	8	2 January 2007	(Germany) Oberstdorf	5 km C + 5 km F Double Pursuit	(Norway) Kristin Størmer Steira	(Ukraine) Valentyna Shevchenko	(Russia) Olga Zavyalova	(Finland) Virpi Kuitunen	
	9	3 January 2007	(Germany) Oberstdorf	10 km C	(Slovenia) Petra Majdič	(Norway) Kristin Størmer Steira	(Finland) Virpi Kuitunen	(Finland) Virpi Kuitunen	
	10	5 January 2007	(Italy) Asiago	Sprint F	(Finland) Virpi Kuitunen	(Norway) Marit Bjørgen	(Italy) Arianna Follis	(Finland) Virpi Kuitunen	
	11	6 January 2007	(Italy) Val di Fiemme	15 km C Mass Start	(Finland) Virpi Kuitunen	(Finland) Aino-Kaisa Saarinen	(Norway) Marit Bjørgen	(Finland) Virpi Kuitunen	
	12	7 January 2007	(Italy) Val di Fiemme	10 km F Pursuit; Final Climb	(Czech Republic) Kateřina Neumannová	(Norway) Kristin Størmer Steira	(Ukraine) Valentyna Shevchenko	(Finland) Virpi Kuitunen	
7	1st Tour de Ski Overall (29 December 2006 – 7 January 2007)				(Finland) Virpi Kuitunen	(Norway) Marit Bjørgen	(Ukraine) Valentyna Shevchenko	(Finland) Virpi Kuitunen	
8	13	20 January 2007	(Russia) Rybinsk	15 km F Mass Start	(Finland) Riitta-Liisa Roponen	(Czech Republic) Kateřina Neumannová	(Finland) Aino-Kaisa Saarinen	(Finland) Virpi Kuitunen	
9	14	21 January 2007	(Russia) Rybinsk	Sprint F	(Italy) Arianna Follis	(Germany) Claudia Künzel-Nystad	(United States) Kikkan Randall	(Finland) Virpi Kuitunen	
10	15	27 January 2007	(Estonia) Otepää	10 km C	(Poland) Justyna Kowalczyk	(Finland) Virpi Kuitunen	(Ukraine) Valentyna Shevchenko	(Finland) Virpi Kuitunen	
11	16	28 January 2007	(Estonia) Otepää	Sprint C	(Finland) Virpi Kuitunen	(Norway) Astrid Jacobsen	(Russia) Yevgeniya Shapovalova	(Finland) Virpi Kuitunen	
12	17	3 February 2007	(Switzerland) Davos	10 km F	(Finland) Virpi Kuitunen	(Russia) Olga Zavyalova	(Norway) Marit Bjørgen	(Finland) Virpi Kuitunen	
13	18	15 February 2007	(China) Changchun	Sprint C	(Russia) Yevgeniya Shapovalova	(Russia) Natalya Matveyeva	(Norway) Guro Strøm Solli	(Finland) Virpi Kuitunen	
14	19	16 February 2007	(China) Changchun	10 km F	(Czech Republic) Kateřina Neumannová	(France) Karine Philippot	(Kazakhstan) Svetlana Malahova	(Finland) Virpi Kuitunen	
FIS Nordic World Ski Championships 2007 (22 February–4 March)
15	20	10 March 2007	(Finland) Lahti	Sprint F	(Finland) Virpi Kuitunen	(Finland) Riitta-Liisa Roponen	(Sweden) Anna Dahlberg	(Finland) Virpi Kuitunen	
16	21	11 March 2007	(Finland) Lahti	10 km C	(Estonia) Kristina Šmigun	(Russia) Olga Zavyalova	(Germany) Viola Bauer	(Finland) Virpi Kuitunen	
17	22	14 March 2007	(Norway) Drammen	Sprint C	(Finland) Virpi Kuitunen	(Slovenia) Petra Majdič	(Finland) Aino-Kaisa Saarinen	(Finland) Virpi Kuitunen	
18	23	17 March 2007	(Norway) Oslo	30 km C	(Finland) Aino-Kaisa Saarinen	(Finland) Virpi Kuitunen	(Slovenia) Petra Majdič	(Finland) Virpi Kuitunen	
19	24	21 March 2007	(Sweden) Stockholm	Sprint C	(Slovenia) Petra Majdič	(Finland) Virpi Kuitunen	(Sweden) Anna Dahlberg	(Finland) Virpi Kuitunen	
20	25	24 March 2007	(Sweden) Falun	7.5 km C + 7.5 km F Double Pursuit	(Norway) Marit Bjørgen	(Czech Republic) Kateřina Neumannová	(Norway) Therese Johaug	(Finland) Virpi Kuitunen	

=== Men's team ===
WC	Date	Place	Discipline	Winner	Second	Third	Ref.
1	29 October 2006	(Germany) Düsseldorf	Team Sprint F	Sweden I Björn Lind; Peter Larsson	Norway II Øystein Pettersen; Eldar Rønning	Italy I Renato Pasini; Cristian Zorzi	
2	19 November 2006	(Sweden) Gällivare	4 × 10 km relay C/F	Germany Jens Filbrich; Franz Göring; Tobias Angerer; Axel Teichmann	Russia Nikolay Pankratov; Vasily Rochev; Alexander Legkov; Yevgeny Dementyev	Czech Republic Martin Koukal; Lukáš Bauer; Jiří Magál; Milan Šperl	
3	17 December 2006	(France) La Clusaz	4 × 10 km relay C/F	Russia I Vasily Rochev; Nikolay Pankratov; Alexander Legkov; Yevgeny Dementyev	Norway Tor Arne Hetland; Eldar Rønning; Ole Einar Bjørndalen; Petter Northug	Germany Benjamin Seifert; Axel Teichmann; René Sommerfeldt; Tobias Angerer	
	21 January 2007	(Russia) Rybinsk	Team Sprint C	cancelled, due to rescheduled sprint to Rybinsk (21 Jan)			
4	4 February 2007	(Switzerland) Davos	4 × 10 km relay C/F	Russia Ivan Babikov; Sergey Novikov; Ilia Chernousov; Sergey Shiryayev	Italy Valerio Checchi; Giorgio Di Centa; Fabio Santus; Pietro Piller Cottrer	France Jean-Marc Gaillard; Vincent Vittoz; Emmanuel Jonnier; Alexandre Rousselet	
5	25 March 2007	(Sweden) Falun	4 × 10 km relay C/F	Norway I Øystein Pettersen; Odd-Bjørn Hjelmeset; Frode Estil; Petter Northug	Russia Nikolay Pankratov; Vasily Rochev; Alexander Legkov; Maxim Vylegzhanin	France Christophe Perrillat-Collomb; Jean-Marc Gaillard; Vincent Vittoz; Emmanuel Jonnier	

=== Women's team ===
WC	Date	Place	Discipline	Winner	Second	Third	Ref.
1	29 October 2006	(Germany) Düsseldorf	Team Sprint F	Norway I Ella Gjømle; Marit Bjørgen	Sweden I Britta Norgren; Lina Andersson	Finland II Virpi Kuitunen; Aino-Kaisa Saarinen	
2	19 November 2006	(Sweden) Gällivare	4 × 5 km relay C/F	Norway I Vibeke Skofterud; Hilde Gjermundshaug Pedersen; Kristin Størmer Steira; Marit Bjørgen	Germany I Manuela Henkel; Katrin Zeller; Evi Sachenbacher-Stehle; Claudia Künzel	Finland Kirsi Välimaa; Virpi Kuitunen; Riitta-Liisa Roponen; Aino-Kaisa Saarinen	
3	17 December 2006	(France) La Clusaz	4 × 5 km relay C/F	Germany Stefanie Böhler; Viola Bauer; Claudia Künzel-Nystad; Evi Sachenbacher-Stehle	Sweden Lina Andersson; Sara Lindborg; Charlotte Kalla; Britta Norgren	Czech Republic Helena Erbenová; Kamila Rajdlová; Ivana Janečková; Kateřina Neumannová	
	21 January 2007	(Russia) Rybinsk	Team Sprint C	cancelled, due to rescheduled sprint to Rybinsk (21 Jan)			
4	4 February 2007	(Switzerland) Davos	4 × 5 km relay C/F	Sweden Lina Andersson; Anna Karin Strömstedt; Charlotte Kalla; Britta Norgren	Norway I Astrid Jacobsen; Vibeke Skofterud; Kristin Størmer Steira; Marit Bjørgen	Finland Pirjo Muranen; Aino-Kaisa Saarinen; Kati Venäläinen; Riitta-Liisa Roponen	
5	25 March 2007	(Sweden) Falun	4 × 5 km relay C/F	Germany Stefanie Böhler; Viola Bauer; Evi Sachenbacher-Stehle; Claudia Künzel-Nystad	Finland I Pirjo Muranen; Virpi Kuitunen; Riitta-Liisa Roponen; Aino-Kaisa Saarinen	Sweden I Anna Dahlberg; Maria Rydqvist; Charlotte Kalla; Britta Norgren	

== Men's standings ==
Below are tables showing the number of points won in the 2006–07 Cross-Country Skiing World Cup for men.

The first place skier got 100 points, second place got 80, 3rd - 60, 4th - 50, 5th - 45, 6th - 40, 7th - 36, 8th - 32, 9th - 29, 10th - 26, 11th - 24, 12th - 22, 13th - 20, 14th - 18, 15th - 16, 16th - 15... and from then on all the way to 30th - 1 point.

11 distance events and five sprint events counted in the World Cup overall standings.

=== Overall ===
Pos	Skier	1	2	3	4	6	7	8-15	16	17	18	19	20	21	22	23	24	25	26	27	28	Pts
1	(Germany) Tobias Angerer	4	8		13		1	1	3	3	6				1	9	3		2		1	1131
2	(Russia) Alexander Legkov		7		12	22	2	2	1		25										26	578
3	(Norway) Eldar Rønning	1		8	1	1		17			26			17		3	2	22				556
4	(Norway) Tor Arne Hetland	3		3	7	2	15	5		15	20		3		18		17					522
5	(Norway) Odd-Bjørn Hjelmeset			2	11	4					3			16			1	7	1		17	479
6	(France) Vincent Vittoz		30		2	9	14	19	7				1=		2	10					5	463
7	(Norway) Petter Northug	11				24		4							5	1	7		12		23	442
8	(Norway) Jens Arne Svartedal	15		1	19	15		21				1		21		2		18		12		386
9	(Finland) Sami Jauhojärvi		25	22	8	8	26	7			17	8	27=			24	8	13	5			382
10	(Norway) Frode Estil				16	6		11			2						4		3		6	381
11	(Norway) Simen Østensen							3			30	5		5	19			14				361
12	(Sweden) Mathias Fredriksson		27		4	14	11	14			13		27=		13		14		17	19	2	336
13	(Germany) Franz Göring		3					6			4				6		24					317
14	(Russia) Yevgeny Dementiev				18	3	3	8	9		24		18				26					315
15	(Sweden) Anders Södergren				3	5	4	16			23						11				4	297
16	(Russia) Nikolay Pankratov				29		13	10	23	2	11	7									13	294
17	(Germany) René Sommerfeldt						8	15	6	20	8				11		15		4			269
18	(Germany) Axel Teichmann		6	7			5				1	22			8							262
19	(Germany) Jens Filbrich		9		9	12	12	9	19					29	15		29					250
20	(Sweden) Emil Jönsson			6								6		7		7		4		2		246
21	(France) Emmanuel Jonnier		16					26	2		28				3						3	238
22	(Norway) Trond Iversen	9		4						13		12		4		10		3		9		218
23	(Russia) Vasily Rochev			10	17					4	15	2				17	17					214
24	(Norway) Børre Næss	13												2		29		1		24		209
25	(Sweden) Mats Larsson					16								10			23	2		3	18	202
25	(Estonia) Jaak Mae				5	26					5						5		6		12	202
27	(Russia) Sergey Shiryayev							12	10				7		4							200
28	(Norway) Øystein Pettersen	2		9												16	19	11			11	184
29	(Czech Republic) Jiří Magál		12				29	13					8						18		9	178
30	(Norway) Ola Vigen Hattestad									30		23		1		22		21		4		177

=== Distance ===
Rank		Points
1	Tobias Angerer (GER)	592
2	Vincent Vittoz (FRA)	415
3	Odd-Bjørn Hjelmeset (NOR)	348
4	Eldar Rønning (NOR)	286
5	Frode Estil (NOR)	285
6	Alexander Legkov (RUS)	260
7	Mathias Fredriksson (SWE)	255
8	Anders Södergren (SWE)	238
9	Emmanuel Jonnier (FRA)	219
10	Axel Teichmann (GER)	217

=== Sprint ===
Rank		Points
1	Jens Arne Svartedal (NOR)	341
2	Trond Iversen (NOR)	286
3	Emil Jönsson (SWE)	282
4	Tor Arne Hetland (NOR)	234
5	Eldar Rønning (NOR)	215
6	Andrew Newell (USA)	210
7	Børre Næss (NOR)	209
8	Johan Kjølstad (NOR)	181
9	Ola Vigen Hattestad (NOR)	178
10	Vasily Rochev (RUS)	170

== Women's standings ==
Below are tables showing the number of points won in the 2006–07 Cross-Country Skiing World Cup for women.

The first place skier got 100 points, second place got 80, 3rd - 60, 4th - 50, 5th - 45, 6th - 40, 7th - 36, 8th - 32, 9th - 29, 10th - 26, 11th - 24, 12th - 22, 13th - 20, 14th - 18, 15th - 16, 16th - 15... and from then on all the way to 30th - 1 point.

11 distance events and five sprint events counted in the World Cup overall standings.

=== Overall ===
Pos	Skier	1	2	3	4	5	6	7-14	15	16	17	18	19	20	21	22	23	24	25	26	27	Pts
1	(Finland) Virpi Kuitunen	12	13	2	1	1	1	1	5	4	2	1	1			1	12	1	2	2	28	1510
2	(Norway) Marit Bjørgen	1	3	3	2	17		2			4	19	3			8	16		10	19	1	941
3	(Czech Republic) Kateřina Neumannová	24	1		4	5	4	5	2	6			4		1	6	7		7		2	894
4	(Slovenia) Petra Majdič	10	8	1	7	2	8	6			15	9	11			4	6	2	3	1	26	844
5	(Finland) Aino-Kaisa Saarinen	17	17	8	8	3	7	4	3	16	6	6	17			9	5	3	1	11	6	826
6	(Finland) Riitta-Liisa Roponen		9=		12	8	2	13	1	13			15			2	9		5		16	548
7	(Ukraine) Valentyna Shevchenko		4		6	9	6	3			3	25	12				23		12		11	541
8	(Poland) Justyna Kowalczyk		18		27	4	27	11			1	7	5			11	10	7		6	21	484
9	(Germany) Evi Sachenbacher-Stehle	7	19	16	18	25	9	8	9	10			25=	9	8			19	16	27	4	438
10	(Italy) Arianna Follis	5	14	18		30=	3	16	10	1			21			5	25	28		29	8	419
11	(Estonia) Kristina Šmigun		2		3	10	15		7		21						1		8		5	405
12	(Russia) Olga Zavyalova		9=		15	14	25	14	8				2				2		9		7	398
13	(Germany) Claudia Künzel-Nystad	23	16	15	21	28	17	19	22	2	14	28	8			14	17	17	4		13	369
14	(Norway) Kristin Størmer Steira		12			19	5	7			23		7				4		11		10	367
15	(Norway) Vibeke Skofterud		5	27	5	6	19	9			7		19				14		13		15	364
16	(Germany) Viola Bauer			26	13	15		10			16	27		10	16		3	14	20	10	18	333
17	(Russia) Natalya Matveyeva	2		23						5	24	4		2	13=	23		18		9		311
18	(France) Karine Philippot	21	22		20		14	12			19		6		2	24					19	287
19	(Italy) Marianna Longa		11		22	13		15	17	18	5		18				21		6		9	281
20	(Sweden) Lina Andersson	4		7		30=					9	5	10	5				6		12		272
21	(Sweden) Anna Dahlberg											14		6		3	15	4		3	20	255
22	(Russia) Natalya Korostelyova		15	11	28	11	24	23	11	7			9			22		30	18			218
23	(Russia) Yevgeniya Shapovalova			13						14		3		1	18	26						216
24	(Norway) Astrid Uhrenholdt Jacobsen	25		4							17	2								4	17	214
25	(Germany) Stefanie Böhler	18		10				21						11	6	17	11	20	21	17	23	213
26	(Norway) Ella Gjømle	3	30	6	14						28	16				12	13		27	23		191
27	(Finland) Mona-Liisa Malvalehto	6		5								8						5		13		182
28	(Russia) Alyona Sidko		29			22		29		21	25	12			5	10		12	23	14		176
29	(Finland) Pirjo Manninen	22		25	19	26		22			11	17						21	29	5	29	165
30	(United States) Kikkan Randall			12						3				7		7				30		155

=== Distance ===
Rank		Points
1	Virpi Kuitunen (FIN)	650
2	Kateřina Neumannová (CZE)	627
3	Aino-Kaisa Saarinen (FIN)	441
4	Marit Bjørgen (NOR)	405
5	Kristina Smigun (EST)	405
6	Riitta-Liisa Roponen (FIN)	368
7	Olga Zavyalova (RUS)	326
8	Petra Majdič (SVN)	325
9	Valentyna Shevchenko (UKR)	295
10	Justyna Kowalczyk (POL)	252

=== Sprint ===
Rank		Points
1	Virpi Kuitunen (FIN)	532
2	Petra Majdič (SVN)	385
3	Natalya Matveyeva (RUS)	313
4	Lina Andersson (SWE)	238
5	Anna Dahlberg (SWE)	228
6	Marit Bjørgen (NOR)	216
7	Aino-Kaisa Saarinen (FIN)	214
8	Arianna Follis (ITA)	208
9	Yevgeniya Shapovalova (RUS)	203
10	Astrid Uhrenholdt Jacobsen (NOR)	182

== Nations Cup ==
This is the sum of all individual points scored plus points for relay events. Relays count double (200 to the winner), while two teams may be counted for team sprints.

=== Overall ===
Pos	Nation	Points	Men's (Rk)	Women's (Rk)
1	Norway	849	522 (1)	327 (1)
2	Sweden	380	174 (3)	206 (2)
3	Germany	337	201 (2)	136 (4)
4	Italy	245	130 (4)	115 (6)
5	Finland	208	33 (9)	175 (3)
6	Russia	177	42 (7)	135 (5)
7	Switzerland	139	74 (5)	65 (8)
8	Slovenia	88		88 (7)
9	France	87	50 (6)	37 (10)
10	Japan	72	29 (12)	42 (9)
11	Estonia	51	41 (8)	10 (14)
12	Czech Republic	40	33 (9)	7 (15)
13	Austria	35	22 (13)	13 (13)
14	United States	32	32 (11)	
15	Belarus	31		31 (11)
16	China	30	10 (15)	20 (12)
17	Poland	15	15 (14)	

== Achievements ==
Victories in this World Cup (all-time number of victories as of 2006/07 season in parentheses)

Men

- Tobias Angerer (GER), 4 (10) first places
- Eldar Rønning (NOR), 4 (4) first places
- Jens Arne Svartedal (NOR), 2 (11) first places
- Odd-Bjørn Hjelmeset (NOR), 2 (8) first places
- Vincent Vittoz (FRA), 2 (7) first places
- Tor Arne Hetland (NOR), 1 (11) first place
- Axel Teichmann (GER), 1 (6) first place
- Petter Northug (NOR), 1 (2) first place
- Børre Næss (NOR), 1 (2) first place
- Ole Einar Bjørndalen (NOR), 1 (1) first place
- Christoph Eigenmann (SUI), 1 (1) first place
- Franz Göring (GER), 1 (1) first place
- Sergey Shiryayev (RUS), 1 (1) first place
- Alexander Legkov (RUS), 1 (1) first place
- Renato Pasini (ITA), 1 (1) first place
- Toni Livers (SUI), 1 (1) first place
- Ola Vigen Hattestad (NOR), 1 (1) first place
- Mikhail Devyatyarov (RUS), 1 (1) first place

Women

- Virpi Kuitunen (FIN), 10 (14) first places
- Marit Bjørgen (NOR), 3 (29) first places
- Kateřina Neumannová (CZE), 3 (19) first places
- Petra Majdič (SLO), 3 (4) first places
- Kristina Šmigun (EST), 1 (16) first place
- Kristin Størmer Steira (NOR), 1 (2) first place
- Arianna Follis (ITA), 1 (2) first place
- Riitta-Liisa Roponen (FIN), 1 (1) first place
- Justyna Kowalczyk (POL), 1 (1) first place
- Yevgeniya Shapovalova (RUS), 1 (1) first place
- Aino-Kaisa Saarinen (FIN), 1 (1) first place

== Retirements ==
Men

Women

Kateřina Neumannová (CZE)

== See also ==
- 2007 in cross-country skiing
