= Cross-country skiing at the 2010 Winter Olympics – Men's 30 kilometre pursuit =

Men's 30 kilometre pursuit at the XXI Olympic Winter Games
- Pictogram for cross country
- Venue: Whistler Olympic Park
- Dates: 20 February 2010
- Competitors: 64 from 26 nations
- Winning time: 1:15:11.4

Medalists
1st place, gold medalist(s)		Marcus Hellner	Sweden
2nd place, silver medalist(s)		Tobias Angerer	Germany
3rd place, bronze medalist(s)		Johan Olsson	Sweden

The men's 15 kilometre + 15 kilometre double Pursuit cross-country skiing competition at the 2010 Winter Olympics in Vancouver, Canada, was held on 20 February at Whistler Olympic Park in Whistler, British Columbia, at 13:30 PST.

== Summary ==
The 30 km double pursuit format has been competed at the world championship level since 2005 and at the Winter Olympic level since 2006. Russia's Yevgeny Dementyev was the defending Olympic champion, but didn't defend after it was reported that he tested positive to erythropoietin (EPO) in August 2009. Norway's Petter Northug was the reigning world champion. Italy's Pietro Piller Cottrer won the test event that took place at the Olympic venue on 17 January 2009. The last World Cup event prior to the 2010 Games in this format took place on 23 January 2010 in Rybinsk, Russia, and was won by Russian Artem Zhmurko. Zhrumko did not qualify for the men's cross-country team for Russia at the 2010 Winter Olympics.

The pursuit consisted of a 15 kilometre section raced in the classic style, followed by a 15 kilometre portion raced freestyle. In between the sections, each skier takes time (approximately 30 seconds) to change skis and poles.

Top three leaders after the classic portion of the event were Bauer (who finished seventh), Cologna (who finished 13th), and Olsson. Pit stop leaders were test event winner Piller Cottrer (who finished 14th), Babikov (who finished fifth), and defending World Champion Northug (who finished 11th). Hellner was Sweden's first male individual gold medalist in the traditional cross-country skiing distances at the Winter Olympics since Gunde Svan's 50 km victory at Calgary in 1988.

== Results ==
Rank	Bib	Name	Country	15 km classic	Rank	Pitstop	15 km free	Rank	Finish time	Deficit
1st place, gold medalist(s)	2	Marcus Hellner	Sweden	39:43.5	11	22.6	35:05.3	2	1:15:11.4	0.0
2nd place, silver medalist(s)	17	Tobias Angerer	Germany	39:40.9	6	26.0	35:06.6	3	1:15:13.5	+2.1
3rd place, bronze medalist(s)	16	Johan Olsson	Sweden	39:39.9	3	24.8	35:09.5	5	1:15:14.2	+2.8
4	8	Alexander Legkov	Russia	39:40.2	4	26.3	35:08.9	4	1:15:15.4	+4.0
5	15	Ivan Babikov	Canada	40:08.9	25	22.1	34:49.5	1	1:15:20.5	+9.1
6	13	Jens Filbrich	Germany	39:41.3	7	24.8	35:18.9	6	1:15:25.0	+13.6
7	3	Lukáš Bauer	Czech Republic	39:39.0	1	25.9	35:20.3	7	1:15:25.2	+13.8
8	41	George Grey	Canada	39:41.5	8	25.0	35:25.5	8	1:15:32.0	+20.6
9	24	Alex Harvey	Canada	39:44.1	12	22.8	35:36.1	10	1:15:43.0	+31.6
10	34	Anders Södergren	Sweden	39:48.3	18	23.5	35:35.2	9	1:15:47.0	+35.6
11	1	Petter Northug	Norway	39:45.0	13	22.5	35:45.6	11	1:15:53.1	+41.7
12	6	Giorgio Di Centa	Italy	39:40.6	5	26.2	35:58.3	12	1:16:05.1	+53.7
13	4	Dario Cologna	Switzerland	39:39.4	2	25.5	36:07.3	13	1:16:12.2	+1:00.8
14	11	Pietro Piller Cottrer	Italy	39:49.3	20	21.6	36:09.0	14	1:16:19.9	+1:08.5
15	10	Vincent Vittoz	France	39:45.9	14	26.8	36:10.7	15	1:16:23.4	+1:12.0
16	31	Devon Kershaw	Canada	39:46.3	15	22.9	36:14.4	16	1:16:23.6	+1:12.2
17	12	Maxim Vylegzhanin	Russia	39:42.3	9	27.7	36:54.2	20	1:17:04.2	+1:52.8
18	20	Martin Johnsrud Sundby	Norway	39:48.8	19	25.7	36:50.0	19	1:17:04.5	+1:53.1
19	30	Tord Asle Gjerdalen	Norway	40:23.4	28	24.3	36:16.8	17	1:17:04.5	+1:53.1
20	18	Curdin Perl	Switzerland	39:46.8	16	23.8	36:54.4	21	1:17:05.0	+1:53.6
21	7	René Sommerfeldt	Germany	39:49.9	21	25.6	36:56.4	22	1:17:11.9	+2:00.5
22	32	Toni Livers	Switzerland	39:50.6	22	25.5	37:09.9	24	1:17:26.0	+2:14.6
23	14	Daniel Rickardsson	Sweden	39:47.6	17	25.3	37:21.1	26	1:17:34.0	+2:22.6
24	22	Thomas Moriggl	Italy	40:11.3	26	23.3	37:06.3	23	1:17:40.9	+2:29.5
25	27	Martin Bajčičák	Slovakia	40:03.4	24	29.6	37:25.1	27	1:17:58.1	+2:46.7
26	23	Maurice Manificat	France	41:12.3	31	26.5	36:19.4	18	1:17:58.2	+2:46.8
27	46	Martin Jakš	Czech Republic	40:01.5	23	23.6	37:33.1	28	1:17:58.2	+2:46.8
28	50	Yevgeniy Velichko	Kazakhstan	40:23.0	27	25.2	37:12.0	25	1:18:00.2	+2:48.8
29	45	Paul Constantin Pepene	Romania	41:30.3	35	25.1	37:38.7	28	1:19:34.1	+4:22.7
30	9	Jean-Marc Gaillard	France	39:42.8	10	27.5	39:37.8	44	1:19:48.1	+4:36.7
31	53	Vicenc Vilarrubla	Spain	41:28.8	33	23.6	37:55.8	31	1:19:48.2	+4:36.8
32	36	Nikolay Pankratov	Russia	40:32.8	29	25.0	38:51.1	35	1:19:48.9	+4:37.5
33	47	Lari Lehtonen	Finland	41:28.5	32	25.1	38:40.9	33	1:20:34.5	+5:23.1
34	49	James Southam	United States	41:29.5	34	29.0	38:47.7	34	1:20:46.2	+5:34.8
35	37	Tom Reichelt	Germany	42:29.0	45	25.5	38:18.7	32	1:21:13.2	+6:01.8
36	28	Eldar Rønning	Norway	41:31.2	36	25.9	39:17.0	40	1:21:14.1	+6:02.7
37	40	Aivar Rehemaa	Estonia	41:48.1	39	26.4	39:01.3	37	1:21:15.8	+6:04.4
38	38	Jiří Magál	Czech Republic	41:45.4	37	26.5	39:27.1	42	1:21:39.0	+6:27.6
39	44	Nobu Naruse	Japan	43:54.7	51	24.7	37:51.7	30	1:22:11.1	+6:59.7
40	59	Javier Gutiérrez	Spain	42:28.1	43	25.4	39:26.9	41	1:22:20.4	+7:09.0
41	52	Roman Leybyuk	Ukraine	42:26.0	40	29.8	39:36.2	43	1:22:32.0	+7:20.6
42	56	Kaspar Kokk	Estonia	42:27.1	41	29.4	39:43.8	46	1:22:40.3	+7:28.9
43	19	Sergey Novikov	Russia	41:47.3	38	27.7	40:29.3	51	1:22:44.3	+7:32.9
44	33	Remo Fischer	Switzerland	42:28.1	43	25.5	39:58.5	49	1:22:52.1	+7:40.7
45	21	Kris Freeman	United States	43:17.1	48	29.4	39:16.1	39	1:23:02.6	+7:51.2
46	54	Karel Tammjärv	Estonia	42:54.1	46	23.8	39:45.0	47	1:23:02.9	+7:51.5
47	48	Ben Sim	Australia	43:16.4	47	23.7	39:45.7	48	1:23:25.8	+8:14.4
48	51	Aliaksei Ivanou	Belarus	44:15.2	53	25.5	38:57.0	36	1:23:37.7	+8:26.3
49	42	Sergey Cherepanov	Kazakhstan	42:27.8	42	29.0	40:46.9	53	1:23:43.7	+8:32.3
50	43	Robin Duvillard	France	43:53.8	50	25.8	39:38.0	45	1:23:57.6	+8:46.2
51	55	Andrew Musgrave	Great Britain	44:28.6	54	31.9	39:07.4	38	1:24:07.9	+8:56.5
52	57	Olexandr Putsko	Ukraine	44:09.3	52	28.6	40:09.2	50	1:24:47.1	+9:35.7
53	39	David Hofer	Italy	43:53.5	49	25.3	40:43.8	52	1:25:02.6	+9:51.2
54	64	Jānis Paipals	Latvia	46:30.9	55	29.0			LAP	
55	63	Jonas Thor Olsen	Denmark	46:32.0	56	27.7			LAP	
56	62	Benjamin Koons	New Zealand						LAP	
	5	Matti Heikkinen	Finland						DNF	
	25	Sami Jauhojärvi	Finland						DNF	
	26	Martin Koukal	Czech Republic						DNF	
	29	Sergei Dolidovich	Belarus						DNF	
	35	Ville Nousiainen	Finland	41:07.8	30	25.3			DNF	
	58	Veselin Tzinzov	Bulgaria						DNF	
	60	Petrică Hogiu	Romania						DNF	
	61	François Soulié	Andorra						DNF	
