= Sergey Shiryayev =

Russian cross-country skier

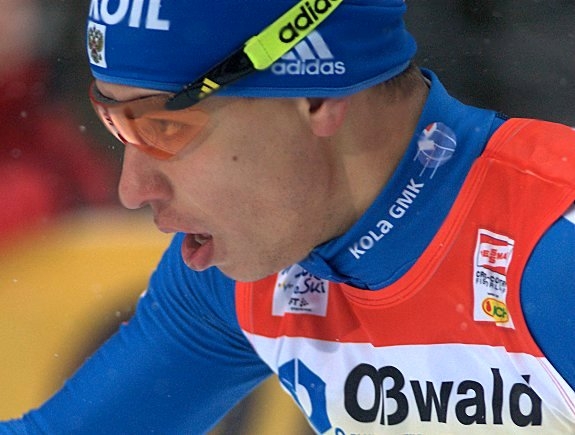
- Sergey Shiryayev in 2010

Personal information
- Nationality: Russia
- Born: 8 February 1983 (age 43) Gorky, Soviet Union

Sport
- Sport: Skiing

World Cup career
- Seasons: 5 – (2007, 2009–2010, 2012–2013)
- Indiv. starts: 34
- Indiv. podiums: 3
- Indiv. wins: 2
- Team starts: 4
- Team podiums: 1
- Team wins: 1
- Overall titles: 0 – (27th in 2007)
- Discipline titles: 0
Medal record
Men's cross-country skiing
Representing Russia
U23 World Championships
Silver medal – second place	2006 Kranj	30 km skiathlon

Sergey Yuryevich Shiryayev (Russian: Серге́й Юрьевич Ширя́ев, born 8 February 1983) is a Russian cross-country skier who competed between 2002 and 2015. His best finish at the FIS Nordic World Ski Championships was 11th in the 15 km event (9.3 miles) at the 2007 event in Sapporo, but that result was declared null and void upon announcing Shiryayev's disqualification for doping on EPO at the last day of the championships on 4 March 2007. His case was heard at the FIS Council meeting in Portorož, Slovenia in May 2007, resulting in a two-year suspension from the sport. Two other coaches also received sanctions from the Russian Ski Federation.

Shiryayev's best World Cup finish was third in a 30 km mixed pursuit event (18.6 miles) in Russia in January 2010.

At the 2010 Winter Olympics, he finished 31st in the 15 km event while not finishing the 50 km event (31.1 miles).

== Cross-country skiing results ==
All results are sourced from the International Ski Federation (FIS).

=== Olympic Games ===
Year	Age	15 km individual	30 km skiathlon	50 km mass start	Sprint	4 × 10 km relay	Team sprint
2010	27	31	—	DNF	—	—	—

=== World Championships ===
Year	Age	15 km individual	30 km skiathlon	50 km mass start	Sprint	4 × 10 km relay	Team sprint
2007	24	DSQ	DSQ	—	DSQ	—	—
2011	28	—	—	41	—	—	—

=== World Cup ===
==== Season standings ====
Season	Age	Discipline standings			Ski Tour standings		
Season	Age	Overall	Distance	Sprint	Nordic Opening	Tour de Ski	World Cup Final
2007	24	27	26	NC	—N/a	12	—N/a
2009	26	51	40	NC	—N/a	—	10
2010	27	44	24	NC	—N/a	29	29
2012	29	NC	NC	—	—	—	—
2013	30	NC	NC	NC	—	—	—

==== Individual podiums ====
- 2 victories – (2 SWC)
- 3 podiums – (1 WC, 2 SWC)

No.	Season	Date	Location	Race	Level	Place
1	2006–07	7 January 2007	Val di Fiemme, Italy	11 km Pursuit F	Stage World Cup	1st
2	2008–09	22 March 2009	Falun, Sweden	15 km Pursuit F	Stage World Cup	1st
3	2009–10	23 January 2010	Rybinsk, Russia	15 km + 15 km Skiathlon C/F	World Cup	3rd

==== Team podiums ====
- 1 victory – (1 RL)
- 1 podium – (1 RL)

No.	Season	Date	Location	Race	Level	Place	Teammates
1	2006–07	4 February 2007	Davos, Switzerland	4 × 10 km Relay C/F	World Cup	1st	Babikov / Novikov / Chernousov

== See also ==
- List of sportspeople sanctioned for doping offences
