= Benjamin Seifert =

Germany cross-country skier (born 1982)

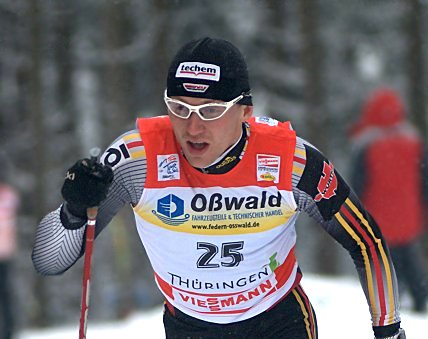
- Benjamin Seifert in 2010

Personal information
- Nationality: Germany
- Born: 9 January 1982 (age 44)

Sport
- Sport: Skiing
- Club: TSG Bau Hammerbrücke

World Cup career
- Seasons: 2003, 2005–2010
- Indiv. starts: 43
- Indiv. podiums: 0
- Team starts: 6
- Team podiums: 1
- Team wins: 0
- Overall titles: 0 – (76th in 2007)
- Discipline titles: 0

Benjamin Seifert (born 9 January 1982) is a Germany cross-country skier who has competed since 2000. His best World Cup finish was third in a 4 × 10 km relay event in France in 2006 while Seifert's best individual finish was 12th in a 15 km event in Finland the following year.

== Cross-country skiing results ==
All results are sourced from the International Ski Federation (FIS).

=== World Cup ===
==== Season standings ====
Season	Age	Discipline standings			Ski Tour standings	
Season	Age	Overall	Distance	Sprint	Tour de Ski	World Cup Final
2003	21	143	—N/a	NC	—N/a	—N/a
2005	23	159	101	NC	—N/a	—N/a
2006	24	106	72	NC	—N/a	—N/a
2007	25	76	44	NC	37	—N/a
2008	26	138	79	NC	49	—
2009	27	143	87	—	—	—
2010	28	NC	NC	NC	DNF	—

==== Team podiums ====
- 1 podium – (1 RL)

No.	Season	Date	Location	Race	Level	Place	Teammates
1	2006–07	17 December 2006	La Clusaz, France	4 × 10 km Relay C/F	World Cup	3rd	Teichmann / Sommerfeldt / Angerer
