= 2007 in cross-country skiing =

== News ==
=== January ===
- 2 - Kristin Størmer Steira wins the second race of the Tour de Ski and claims the yellow jersey with previous leader Marit Bjørgen only finishing in 25th position 55.5 seconds behind Steira who now leads the rankings by 6.1 seconds. In the men's competition leader Christoph Eigenmann does not finish and thus loses his yellow jersey to Simen Østensen who finished in 12th position, 11.6 seconds behind winner Vincent Vittoz.
- 3 - During the second race in Oberstdorf, the third in total for the Tour de Ski, leader Kristin Størmer Steira successfully defends her yellow jersey by finishing second behind Petra Majdič who follows in second position in the overall rankings, 20.4 seconds behind Steira. Franz Göring wins the men's race being the first of three Germans entering the podium, the others being René Sommerfeldt and Tobias Angerer. With leader Simen Østensen finishing in 18th position Angerer overtook him to take the yellow jersey and now leads by 17.0 seconds.

== Cross-country skiing World Cup ==
=== Men's results ===
Date	Place	Discipline	Winner	Leader
28 October 2006	Düsseldorf, Germany	1.5 km F Sprint	(Norway) Eldar Rønning	(Norway) Eldar Rønning
18 November 2006	Gällivare, Sweden	15 km F Individual	(Norway) Ole Einar Bjørndalen	(Norway) Eldar Rønning (Norway) Ole Einar Bjørndalen
25 November 2006	Kuusamo, Finland	1.2 km C Sprint	(Norway) Jens Arne Svartedal	(Norway) Eldar Rønning
26 November 2006	Kuusamo, Finland	15 km C Individual	(Norway) Eldar Rønning	(Norway) Eldar Rønning
13 December 2006	Cogne/Val d'Aosta, Italy	15 km C + 15 km F Pursuit	(Norway) Eldar Rønning	(Norway) Eldar Rønning
16 December 2006	La Clusaz, France	30 km F Mass Start	(Germany) Tobias Angerer	(Norway) Eldar Rønning

=== Women's results ===
Date	Place	Discipline	Winner	Leader
28 October 2006	Düsseldorf, Germany	800m F Sprint	(Norway) Marit Bjørgen	(Norway) Marit Bjørgen
18 November 2006	Gällivare, Sweden	10 km F Individual	(Czech Republic) Kateřina Neumannová	(Norway) Marit Bjørgen
25 November 2006	Kuusamo, Finland	1.2 km C Sprint	(Slovenia) Petra Majdič	(Norway) Marit Bjørgen
26 November 2006	Kuusamo, Finland	10 km C Individual	(Finland) Virpi Kuitunen	(Norway) Marit Bjørgen
13 December 2006	Cogne/Val d'Aosta, Italy	10 km C Individual	(Finland) Virpi Kuitunen	(Finland) Virpi Kuitunen
16 December 2006	La Clusaz, France	15 km F Mass Start	(Finland) Virpi Kuitunen	(Finland) Virpi Kuitunen

== Tour de Ski ==
=== Men's results ===
Date	Place	Discipline	Top 3	Leader
31 December 2006	Munich, Germany	1.2 km F Sprint	(Switzerland) Christoph Eigenmann (Canada) Devon Kershaw (France) Roddy Darragon	(Switzerland) Christoph Eigenmann
2 January 2007	Oberstdorf, Germany	10 km C + 10 km F Pursuit	(France) Vincent Vittoz (Russia) Alexander Legkov (Germany) Tobias Angerer	(Norway) Simen Østensen
3 January 2007	Oberstdorf, Germany	15 km C Individual	(Germany) Franz Göring (Germany) René Sommerfeldt (Germany) Tobias Angerer	(Germany) Tobias Angerer

=== Women's results ===
Date	Place	Discipline	Top 3	Leader
31 December 2006	Munich, Germany	822m F Sprint	(Norway) Marit Bjørgen (Italy) Arianna Follis (Canada) Chandra Crawford	(Norway) Marit Bjørgen
2 January 2007	Oberstdorf, Germany	5 km C + 5 km F Pursuit	(Norway) Kristin Størmer Steira (Ukraine) Valentina Shevchenko (Russia) Olga Savialova	(Norway) Kristin Størmer Steira
3 January 2007	Oberstdorf, Germany	10 km C Individual	(Slovenia) Petra Majdič (Norway) Kristin Størmer Steira (Finland) Virpi Kuitunen	(Norway) Kristin Størmer Steira
