= Axel Teichmann =

German cross-country skier

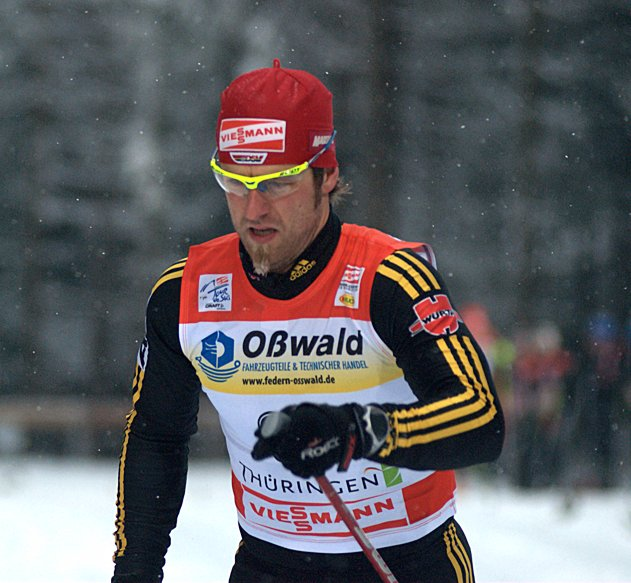
- Teichmann during the Tour de Ski in Oberhof, Germany in January 2010

Personal information
- Nationality: Germany
- Born: 14 July 1979 (age 47) Saalburg-Ebersdorf, East Germany
- Height: 1.86 m (6 ft 1 in)

Sport
- Sport: Skiing
- Club: WSV Bad Lobenstein

World Cup career
- Seasons: 16 – (1999–2014)
- Indiv. starts: 227
- Indiv. podiums: 30
- Indiv. wins: 13
- Team starts: 42
- Team podiums: 19
- Team wins: 8
- Overall titles: 1 – (2005)
- Discipline titles: 1 – (DI)
Medal record
Men's cross-country skiing
Representing Germany
Event	1st	2nd	3rd
Olympic Games	0	2	0
World Championships	2	5	1
Total	2	7	1
Olympic Games
Silver medal – second place	2010 Vancouver	50 km classical
Silver medal – second place	2010 Vancouver	Team sprint
World Championships
Gold medal – first place	2003 Val di Fiemme	15 km classical
Gold medal – first place	2007 Sapporo	30 km double pursuit
Silver medal – second place	2003 Val di Fiemme	4 × 10 km relay
Silver medal – second place	2005 Oberstdorf	Team sprint
Silver medal – second place	2005 Oberstdorf	4 × 10 km relay
Silver medal – second place	2009 Liberec	Team sprint
Silver medal – second place	2009 Liberec	4 × 10 km relay
Bronze medal – third place	2011 Oslo	4 × 10 km relay
Junior World Championships
Gold medal – first place	1999 Saalfelden	10 km classical
Gold medal – first place	1999 Saalfelden	4 × 10 km relay

Axel Teichmann (born 14 July 1979) is a German cross-country skiing coach and former skier.

== Background ==
Teichmann started cross-country skiing at the age of ten. He completed his secondary education at Bad Lobenstein and, from 1993, at Oberhof. Since graduation in 1998, he has been aided in his sporting career by the German armed forces as a military athlete. In addition to professional sport, Teichmann studies electrical engineering at FernUniversität Hagen.

== Career ==
Teichmann competed at the 2002, the 2010, and the 2014 Winter Olympics. He was sick for a large part of the 2005–06 season and failed to compete in the 2006 Winter Olympics. Due to the Germans selection criteria of either an Olympic medal or a top 10 finish in the World Cup, Teichmann, who won the overall World Cup in 2004–05, was left out of the German A-team for the 2006–07 season. Teichmann was still able to compete, only he received less financing and did not train with the other elite members.

In June 2006 Teichmann had leg surgery for an injury he had, but he was given a modified wheelchair while he recovered. The wheelchair was made with rollerskis, so that he could still train.

He won silver with Tim Tscharnke in the Team Sprint at the 2010 Winter Olympics in Vancouver.

After the 50 km freestyle race at the 2014 Winter Olympics in Sochi, he announced his immediate retirement from the sport.

== Cross-country skiing results ==
All results are sourced from the International Ski Federation (FIS).

=== Olympic Games ===
- 2 medals – (2 silver)

Year	Age	15 km	Pursuit	30 km	50 km	Sprint	4 × 10 km relay	Team sprint
2002	22	14	38	19	—	DNS	—	—N/a
2010	30	44	—	—N/a	Silver	—	6	Silver
2014	34	8	22	—N/a	39	—	9	—

=== World Championships ===
- 8 medals – (2 gold, 5 silver, 1 bronze)

Year	Age	10 km	15 km	Pursuit	30 km	50 km	Sprint	4 × 10 km relay	Team sprint
1999	19	34	—N/a	DNF	—	—	—N/a	4	—N/a
2001	21	—N/a	14	14	—	—	—	—	—N/a
2003	23	—N/a	Gold	5	—	—	—	Silver	—N/a
2005	25	—N/a	7	30	—N/a	—	—	Silver	Silver
2007	27	—N/a	4	Gold	—N/a	—	—	4	4
2009	29	—N/a	38	30	—N/a	—	—	Silver	Silver
2011	31	—N/a	13	—	—N/a	—	—	Bronze	—
2013	33	—N/a	9	—	—N/a	—	23	7	9

=== Season titles ===
- 2 titles – (1 overall, 1 distance)

Season
Season	Discipline
2005	Overall
2005	Distance

==== Season standings ====
Season	Age	Discipline standings					Ski Tour standings		
Season	Age	Overall	Distance	Long Distance	Middle Distance	Sprint	Nordic Opening	Tour de Ski	World Cup Final
1999	19	77	—N/a	NC	—N/a	67	—N/a	—N/a	—N/a
2000	20	57	—N/a	NC	61	29	—N/a	—N/a	—N/a
2001	21	24	—N/a	—N/a	—N/a	23	—N/a	—N/a	—N/a
2002	22	44	—N/a	—N/a	—N/a	67	—N/a	—N/a	—N/a
2003	23	4	—N/a	—N/a	—N/a	24	—N/a	—N/a	—N/a
2004	24	5	4	—N/a	—N/a	22	—N/a	—N/a	—N/a
2005	25	1st place, gold medalist(s)	1st place, gold medalist(s)	—N/a	—N/a	36	—N/a	—N/a	—N/a
2006	26	24	15	—N/a	—N/a	NC	—N/a	—N/a	—N/a
2007	27	18	10	—N/a	—N/a	37	—N/a	DNF	—N/a
2008	28	8	8	—N/a	—N/a	29	—N/a	13	—
2009	29	6	6	—N/a	—N/a	49	—N/a	3rd place, bronze medalist(s)	59
2010	30	7	10	—N/a	—N/a	36	—N/a	7	DNF
2011	31	49	30	—N/a	—N/a	NC	DNF	DNF	—
2012	32	51	31	—N/a	—N/a	85	42	39	—
2013	33	61	45	—N/a	—N/a	94	48	DNF	—
2014	34	84	50	—N/a	—N/a	NC	DNF	DNF	—

==== Individual podiums ====
- 13 victories – (8 WC, 5 SWC)
- 30 podiums – (20 WC, 10 SWC)

No.	Season	Date	Location	Race	Level	Place
1	2002–03	30 November 2002	Rukatunturi, Finland	15 km Individual C	World Cup	3rd
2	2002–03	21 December 2002	Ramsau, Austria	10 km + 10 km Pursuit C/F	World Cup	1st
3	2002–03	4 January 2003	Kavgolovo, Russia	10 km Individual F	World Cup	3rd
4	2003–04	22 November 2003	Beitostølen, Norway	15 km Individual F	World Cup	3rd
5	2003–04	30 November 2003	Rukatunturi, Finland	15 km + 15 km Pursuit C/F	World Cup	1st
6	2003–04	21 December 2003	Ramsau, Austria	10 km Individual F	World Cup	2nd
7	2004–05	21 November 2004	Gällivare, Sweden	15 km Individual C	World Cup	1st
8	2004–05	27 November 2004	Rukatunturi, Finland	15 km Individual F	World Cup	2nd
9	2004–05	28 November 2004	Rukatunturi, Finland	15 km Individual C	World Cup	1st
10	2004–05	11 December 2004	Lago di Tesero, Italy	15 km + 15 km Pursuit C/F	World Cup	1st
11	2004–05	18 December 2004	Ramsau, Austria	30 km Mass Start F	World Cup	3rd
12	2005–06	10 December 2005	Vernon, Canada	15 km + 15 km Pursuit C/F	World Cup	2nd
13	2005–06	8 March 2006	Falun, Sweden	10 km + 10 km Pursuit C/F	World Cup	3rd
14	2006–07	27 January 2007	Otepää, Estonia	15 km Individual C	World Cup	1st
15	2007–08	27 November 2007	Beitostølen, Norway	15 km Individual F	World Cup	1st
16	2007–08	2 December 2007	Rukatunturi, Finland	15 km Individual C	World Cup	3rd
17	2007–08	8 December 2007	Davos, Switzerland	15 km Individual C	World Cup	1st
18	2007–08	28 December 2007	Nové Město, Czech Republic	4.5 km Individual C	Stage World Cup	2nd
19	2007–08	28 January 2008	Canmore, Canada	15 km + 15 km Pursuit C/F	World Cup	3rd
20	2008–09	13 December 2008	Davos, Switzerland	15 km Individual C	World Cup	2nd
21	2008–09	27 December 2008	Oberhof, Germany	3.75 km Individual F	Stage World Cup	1st
22	2008–09	28 December 2008	Oberhof, Germany	15 km Pursuit C	Stage World Cup	2nd
23	2008–09	31 December 2008	Nové Město, Czech Republic	15 km Individual C	Stage World Cup	1st
24	2008–09	3 January 2009	Val di Fiemme, Italy	20 km Mass Start C	Stage World Cup	1st
25	2008–09	27 December 2008 – 4 January 2009	(Germany) (Czech Republic) (Italy) Tour de Ski	Overall Standings	World Cup	3rd
26	2008–09	20 March 2009	Falun, Sweden	3.3 km Individual F	Stage World Cup	1st
27	2009–10	1 January 2010	Oberhof, Germany	3.7 km Individual F	Stage World Cup	3rd
28	2009–10	3 January 2010	Oberhof, Germany	1.6 km Sprint C	Stage World Cup	3rd
29	2009–10	9 January 2010	Val di Fiemme, Italy	20 km Mass Start C	Stage World Cup	3rd
30	2011–12	30 December 2011	Oberhof, Germany	15 km Pursuit C	Stage World Cup	1st

==== Team podiums ====
- 8 victories – (6 RL, 2 TS)
- 19 podiums – (13 RL, 6 TS)

No.	Season	Date	Location	Race	Level	Place	Teammate(s)
1	2002–03	24 November 2002	Kiruna, Sweden	4 × 10 km Relay C/F	World Cup	3rd	Schlütter / Angerer / Sommerfeldt
2	2002–03	23 March 2003	Falun, Sweden	4 × 10 km Relay C/F	World Cup	3rd	Filbrich / Schlütter / Sommerfeldt
3	2003–04	26 October 2003	Düsseldorf, Germany	6 × 1.5 km Team Sprint F	World Cup	2nd	Angerer
4	2003–04	23 November 2003	Beitostølen, Norway	4 × 10 km Relay C/F	World Cup	1st	Filbrich / Sommerfeldt / Angerer
5	2003–04	11 January 2004	Otepää, Estonia	4 × 10 km Relay C/F	World Cup	1st	Schlütter / Filbrich / Angerer
6	2003–04	7 February 2004	La Clusaz, France	4 × 10 km Relay C/F	World Cup	2nd	Filbrich / Sommerfeldt / Angerer
7	2003–04	15 February 2004	Oberstdorf, Germany	6 × 1.2 km Team Sprint F	World Cup	1st	Filbrich
8	2003–04	22 February 2004	Umeå, Sweden	4 × 10 km Relay C/F	World Cup	1st	Göring / Schlütter / Filbrich
9	2004–05	24 October 2004	Düsseldorf, Germany	6 × 1.5 km Team Sprint F	World Cup	2nd	Angerer
10	2004–05	21 November 2004	Gällivare, Sweden	4 × 10 km Relay C/F	World Cup	1st	Filbrich / Angerer / Sommerfeldt
11	2004–05	23 January 2005	Pragelato, Italy	6 × 1.2 km Team Sprint C	World Cup	1st	Filbrich
12	2005–06	20 November 2005	Beitostølen, Norway	4 × 10 km Relay C/F	World Cup	1st	Schlütter / Filbrich / Angerer
13	2005–06	15 January 2006	Lago di Tesero, Italy	4 × 10 km Relay C/F	World Cup	2nd	Sommerfeldt / Filbrich / Angerer
14	2005–06	18 March 2006	Sapporo, Japan	6 × 1.5 km Team Sprint F	World Cup	3rd	Angerer
15	2006–07	19 November 2006	Gällivare, Sweden	4 × 10 km Relay C/F	World Cup	1st	Angerer / Filbrich / Göring
16	2006–07	17 December 2006	La Clusaz, France	4 × 10 km Relay C/F	World Cup	3rd	Angerer / Seifert / Sommerfeldt
17	2008–09	23 November 2008	Gällivare, Sweden	4 × 10 km Relay C/F	World Cup	3rd	Filbrich / Angerer / Reichelt
18	2009–10	22 November 2009	Beitostølen, Norway	4 × 10 km Relay C/F	World Cup	3rd	Filbrich / Sommerfeldt / Angerer
19	2012–13	3 February 2013	Sochi, Russia	6 × 1.8 km Team Sprint C	World Cup	3rd	Angerer
