= René Sommerfeldt =

German cross-country skier

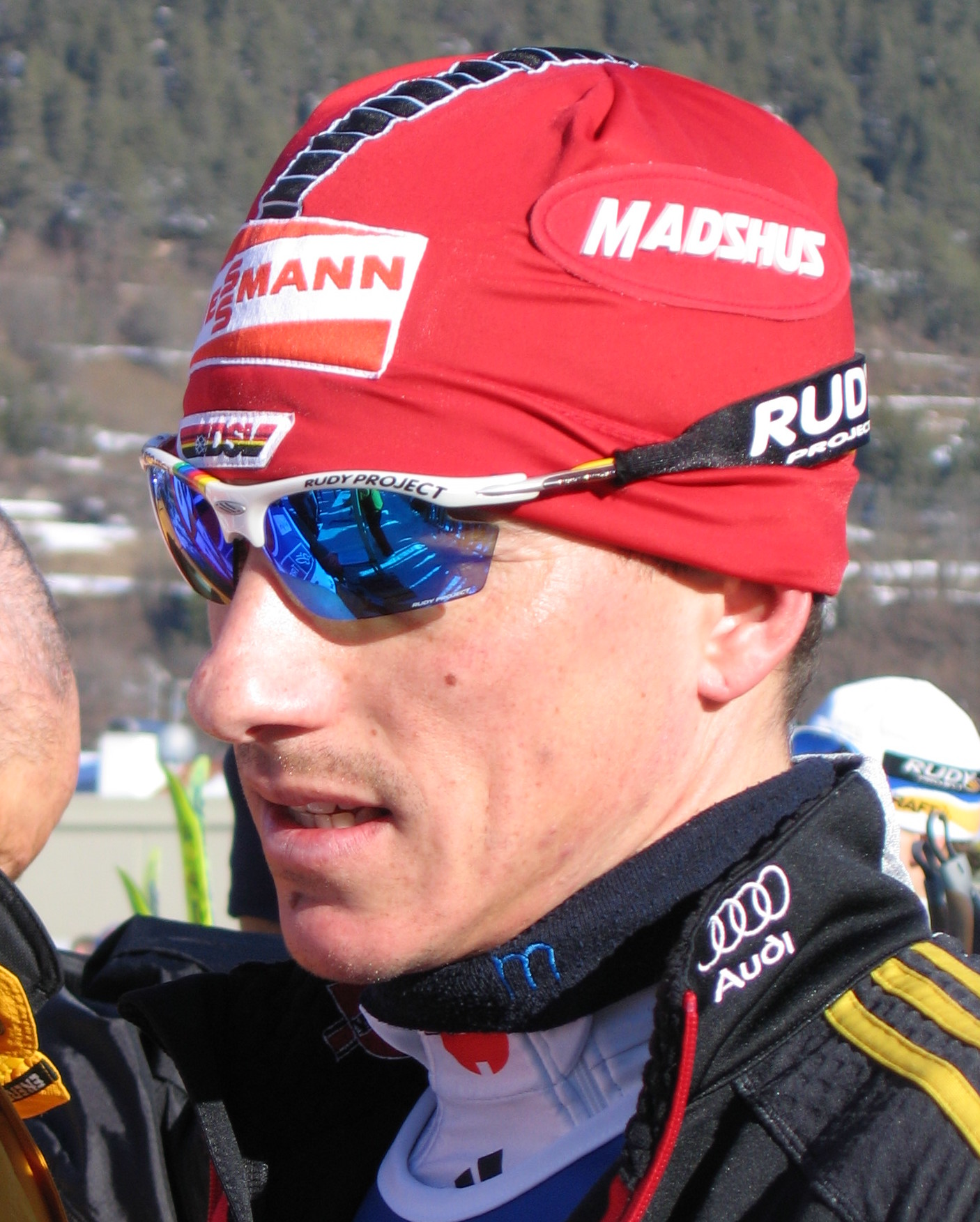

Personal information
- Nationality: Germany
- Born: 2 October 1974 (age 51) Zittau, East Germany

Sport
- Sport: Skiing
- Club: WSC Erzgebierge Oberwiesenthal

World Cup career
- Seasons: 15 – (1996–2010)
- Indiv. starts: 229
- Indiv. podiums: 19
- Indiv. wins: 4
- Team starts: 39
- Team podiums: 15
- Team wins: 2
- Overall titles: 1 – (2004)
- Discipline titles: 1 – (1 DI)
Medal record
Men's cross-country skiing
Representing Germany
Event	1st	2nd	3rd
Olympic Games	0	1	1
World Championships	0	2	1
Total	0	3	2
Olympic Games
Silver medal – second place	2006 Turin	4 × 10 km relay
Bronze medal – third place	2002 Salt Lake City	4 × 10 km relay
World Championships
Silver medal – second place	2001 Lahti	50 km freestyle
Silver medal – second place	2003 Val di Fiemme	4 × 10 km relay
Bronze medal – third place	2001 Lahti	4 × 10 km relay

René Sommerfeldt (born 2 October 1974 in Zittau) is a German cross-country skier who competed from 1994 to 2010. He won two medals in the 4 × 10 km relays at the Winter Olympics with a silver in 2006 and a bronze in 2002. Sommerfeldt's best individual Olympic finish was 12th in the 15 km event in 2006.

Sommerfeldt also has three medals at the FIS Nordic World Ski Championships, earning two silvers (50 km: 2001, 4 × 10 km relay: 2003) and one bronze (4 × 10 km relay: 2001).

He also won the 50 km event at the Holmenkollen Ski Festival in 2004, becoming the second German to win this prestigious honor (the first was Gerhard Grimmer in 1970/71).

Sommerfeldt will become a coach in cross-country skiing for the German team.

== Cross-country skiing results ==
All results are sourced from the International Ski Federation (FIS).

=== Olympic Games ===
- 2 medals – (1 silver, 1 bronze)

Year	Age	10 km	15 km	Pursuit	30 km	50 km	Sprint	4 × 10 km relay	Team sprint
1998	23	38	—N/a	29	DNS	26	—N/a	8	—N/a
2002	27	—N/a	—	10	16	—	19	Bronze	—N/a
2006	31	—N/a	11	DNF	—N/a	36	—	Silver	—
2010	35	—N/a	36	21	—N/a	21	—	6	—

=== World Championships ===
- 3 medals – (2 silver, 1 bronze)

Year	Age	10 km	15 km	Pursuit	30 km	50 km	Sprint	4 × 10 km relay	Team sprint
1997	22	37	—N/a	27	—	—	—N/a	6	—N/a
1999	24	44	—N/a	40	41	—	—N/a	—	—N/a
2001	26	—N/a	—	34	—	Silver	8	Bronze	—N/a
2003	28	—N/a	—	18	23	—	19	Silver	—N/a
2005	30	—N/a	34	28	—N/a	—	—	—	—
2007	32	—N/a	19	13	—N/a	15	—	—	—
2009	34	—N/a	—	31	—N/a	6	—	—	—

=== World Cup ===
==== Season titles ====
- 2 titles – (1 overall, 1 distance)

Season
Season	Discipline
2004	Overall
2004	Distance

==== Season standings ====
Season	Age	Discipline standings					Ski Tour standings	
Season	Age	Overall	Distance	Long Distance	Middle Distance	Sprint	Tour de Ski	World Cup Final
1996	22	43	—N/a	—N/a	—N/a	—N/a	—N/a	—N/a
1997	23	40	—N/a	57	—N/a	29	—N/a	—N/a
1998	24	46	—N/a	51	—N/a	44	—N/a	—N/a
1999	25	58	—N/a	NC	—N/a	62	—N/a	—N/a
2000	26	13	—N/a	28	15	14	—N/a	—N/a
2001	27	6	—N/a	—N/a	—N/a	14	—N/a	—N/a
2002	28	36	—N/a	—N/a	—N/a	46	—N/a	—N/a
2003	29	2nd place, silver medalist(s)	—N/a	—N/a	—N/a	10	—N/a	—N/a
2004	30	1st place, gold medalist(s)	1st place, gold medalist(s)	—N/a	—N/a	31	—N/a	—N/a
2005	31	5	4	—N/a	—N/a	NC	—N/a	—N/a
2006	32	17	9	—N/a	—N/a	NC	—N/a	—N/a
2007	33	17	12	—N/a	—N/a	68	15	—N/a
2008	34	2nd place, silver medalist(s)	3rd place, bronze medalist(s)	—N/a	—N/a	81	2nd place, silver medalist(s)	12
2009	35	61	43	—N/a	—N/a	NC	DNF	21
2010	36	12	12	—N/a	—N/a	71	6	39

==== Individual podiums ====
- 4 victories – (3 WC, 1 SWC)
- 19 podiums – (17 WC, 2 SWC)

No.	Season	Date	Location	Race	Level	Place
1	1999–00	16 February 2000	Ulrichen, Switzerland	10 km Individual F	World Cup	3rd
2	2000–01	10 January 2001	Soldier Hollow, United States	30 km Mass Start F	World Cup	3rd
3	2002–03	10 January 2001	Clusone, Italy	1.4 km Sprint F	World Cup	2nd
4	2002–03	4 January 2003	Kavgolovo, Russia	10 km Individual F	World Cup	1st
5	2003–04	30 November 2003	Rukatunturi, Finland	15 km + 15 km Pursuit C/F	World Cup	3rd
6	2003–04	6 December 2003	Toblach, Italy	30 km Mass Start F	World Cup	2nd
7	2003–04	20 December 2003	Ramsau, Austria	15 km + 15 Pursuit C/F	World Cup	2nd
8	2003–04	6 January 2004	Falun, Sweden	15 km + 15 Pursuit C/F	World Cup	3rd
9	2003–04	13 February 2004	Oberstdorf, Germany	15 km + 15 Pursuit C/F	World Cup	1st
10	2003–04	28 February 2004	Oslo, Norway	50 km Individual F	World Cup	1st
11	2003–04	14 March 2004	Pragelato, Italy	30 km Individual F	World Cup	2nd
12	2004–05	20 November 2004	Gällivare, Sweden	15 km Individual C	World Cup	2nd
13	2004–05	28 November 2004	Rukatunturi, Finland	15 km Individual C	World Cup	3rd
14	2005–06	21 January 2006	Oberstdorf, Germany	15 km + 15 Pursuit C/F	World Cup	3rd
15	2006–07	3 January 2007	Oberstdorf, Germany	15 km Individual C	Stage World Cup	2nd
16	2007–08	6 January 2008	Val di Fiemme, Italy	10 km Pursuit F	Stage World Cup	1st
17	2007–08	28 December 2007 – 6 January 2008	(Czech Republic) (Italy) Tour de Ski	Overall Standings	World Cup	2nd
18	2007–08	25 January 2008	Canmore, Canada	15 km Individual F	World Cup	2nd
19	2007–08	2 March 2008	Lahti, Finland	15 km Individual C	World Cup	2nd

==== Team podiums ====
- 2 victories – (2 RL)
- 15 podiums – (9 RL, 6 TS)

No.	'Season	Date	Location	Race	Level	Place	Teammate(s)
1	2000–01	13 December 2000	Clusone, Italy	10 × 1.5 km Team Sprint F	World Cup	3rd	Schlickenrieder
2	2001–02	3 March 2002	Lahti, Finland	6 × 1.5 km Team Sprint F	World Cup	2nd	Angerer
3	2002–03	24 November 2002	Kiruna, Sweden	4 × 10 km Relay C/F	World Cup	3rd	Schlütter / Teichmann / Angerer
4	2002–03	26 January 2003	Oberhof, Germany	10 × 1.5 km Team Sprint F	World Cup	2nd	Angerer
5	2002–03	14 February 2003	Asiago, Italy	10 × 1.4 km Team Sprint F	World Cup	2nd	Angerer
6	2002–03	23 March 2003	Falun, Sweden	4 × 10 km Relay C/F	World Cup	3rd	Filbrich / Schlütter / Teichmann
7	2003–04	23 November 2003	Beitostølen, Norway	4 × 10 km Relay C/F	World Cup	1st	Filbrich / Teichmann / Angerer
8	2003–04	14 December 2003	Davos, Switzerland	4 × 10 km Relay C/F	World Cup	2nd	Filbrich / Schlütter / Angerer
9	2003–04	7 February 2004	La Clusaz, France	4 × 10 km Relay C/F	World Cup	2nd	Filbrich / Teichmann / Angerer
10	2003–04	15 February 2004	Oberstdorf, Germany	6 × 1.2 km Team Sprint F	World Cup	3rd	Angerer
11	2004–05	21 November 2004	Gällivare, Sweden	4 × 10 km Relay C/F	World Cup	1st	Filbrich / Angerer / Teichmann
12	2004–05	23 January 2005	Pragelato, Italy	6 × 1.2 km Team Sprint C	World Cup	3rd	Schlütter
13	2005–06	15 January 2006	Lago di Tesero, Italy	4 × 10 km Relay C/F	World Cup	2nd	Teichmann / Filbrich / Angerer
14	2006–07	7 December 2006	La Clusaz, France	4 × 10 km Relay C/F	World Cup	3rd	Angerer / Seifert / Teichmann
15	2009–10	22 November 2009	Beitostølen, Norway	4 × 10 km Relay C/F	World Cup	3rd	Filbrich / Teichmann / Angerer
