= Jens Filbrich =

German cross-country skier (born 1979)

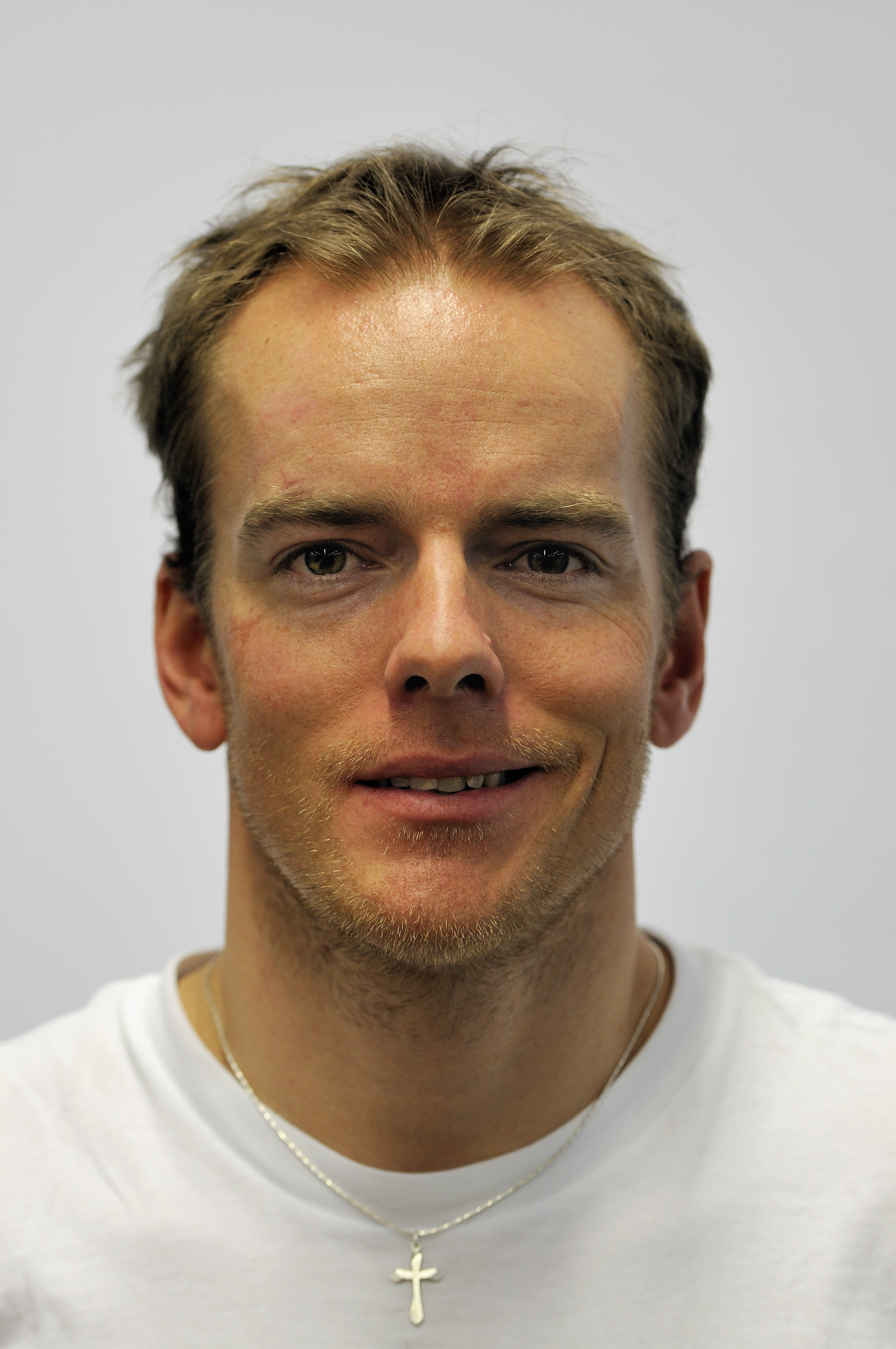
- Filbrich in 2014

Personal information
- Nationality: Germany
- Born: 13 March 1979 (age 47) Suhl, Bezirk Suhl, East Germany

Sport
- Sport: Skiing
- Club: SV Eintracht Frankenhain

World Cup career
- Seasons: 16 – (1999–2014)
- Indiv. starts: 225
- Indiv. podiums: 5
- Indiv. wins: 0
- Team starts: 44
- Team podiums: 15
- Team wins: 8
- Overall titles: 0 – (11th in 2004)
- Discipline titles: 0
Medal record
Men's cross-country skiing
Representing Germany
Olympic Games
Silver medal – second place	2006 Turin	4 × 10 km relay
Bronze medal – third place	2002 Salt Lake City	4 × 10 km relay
World Championships
Silver medal – second place	2003 Val di Fiemme	4 × 10 km relay
Silver medal – second place	2005 Oberstdorf	Team sprint
Silver medal – second place	2005 Oberstdorf	4 × 10 km relay
Silver medal – second place	2009 Liberec	4 × 10 km relay
Bronze medal – third place	2001 Lahti	4 × 10 km relay
Bronze medal – third place	2007 Sapporo	50 km classical
Bronze medal – third place	2011 Oslo	4 × 10 km relay
Junior World Championships
Gold medal – first place	1999 Saalfelden	4 × 10 km relay
Bronze medal – third place	1999 Saafelden	10 km classical
Bronze medal – third place	1999 Saafelden	30 km freestyle

Jens Filbrich (born 13 March 1979 in Suhl, Bezirk Suhl) is a German cross-country skier who has been competing since 1998. He won two medals in the 4 × 10 km relay at the Winter Olympics with a silver in 2006 and a bronze in 2002. Filbrich's best individual Olympic finish was 17th in the 50 km freestyle event in 2006.

Filbrich also has six medals at the FIS Nordic World Ski Championships, earning four silvers (Team sprint: 2005, 4 × 10 km: 2003, 2005, 2009) and two bronzes (4 × 10 km: 2001 50 km: 2007).

Filbrich has two skiing victories in the World and Continental Cups as of the 2005–6 season (2003, 2005).

He is the son of former cross-country skier Sigrun Krause, and former cross-country skier, coach and sports official Wolfgang Filbrich.

== Cross-country skiing results ==
All results are sourced from the International Ski Federation (FIS).

=== Olympic Games ===
- 2 medals – (1 silver, 1 bronze)

Year	Age	15 km	Pursuit	30 km	50 km	Sprint	4 × 10 km relay	Team sprint
2002	22	33	—	—	21	—	Bronze	—N/a
2006	26	—	22	—N/a	17	—	Silver	4
2010	30	—	6	—N/a	16	—	6	—
2014	34	14	—	—N/a	—	—	9	—

=== World Championships ===
- 7 medals – (4 silver, 3 bronze)

Year	Age	15 km	Pursuit	30 km	50 km	Sprint	4 × 10 km relay	Team sprint
2001	21	23	—	20	—	—	Bronze	—N/a
2003	23	—	16	6	—	—	Silver	—N/a
2005	25	8	14	—N/a	—	—	Silver	Silver
2007	27	—	4	—N/a	Bronze	—	4	—
2009	29	13	10	—N/a	—	—	Silver	—
2011	31	—	30	—N/a	—	—	Bronze	4
2013	33	—	33	—N/a	9	—	—	—

=== World Cup ===
==== Season standings ====
Season	Age	Discipline standings					Ski Tour standings		
Season	Age	Overall	Distance	Long Distance	Middle Distance	Sprint	Nordic Opening	Tour de Ski	World Cup Final
1999	20	NC	—N/a	NC	—N/a	—	—N/a	—N/a	—N/a
2000	21	NC	—N/a	—	NC	NC	—N/a	—N/a	—N/a
2001	22	106	—N/a	—N/a	—N/a	NC	—N/a	—N/a	—N/a
2002	23	60	—N/a	—N/a	—N/a	NC	—N/a	—N/a	—N/a
2003	24	29	—N/a	—N/a	—N/a	51	—N/a	—N/a	—N/a
2004	25	16	13	—N/a	—N/a	NC	—N/a	—N/a	—N/a
2005	26	11	8	—N/a	—N/a	NC	—N/a	—N/a	—N/a
2006	27	19	10	—N/a	—N/a	NC	—N/a	—N/a	—N/a
2007	28	19	20	—N/a	—N/a	84	—N/a	9	—N/a
2008	29	30	19	—N/a	—N/a	84	—N/a	24	9
2009	30	22	18	—N/a	—N/a	NC	—N/a	12	22
2010	31	27	23	—N/a	—N/a	112	—N/a	11	—
2011	32	26	23	—N/a	—N/a	NC	14	15	DNF
2012	33	25	18	—N/a	—N/a	NC	22	13	25
2013	34	28	19	—N/a	—N/a	NC	19	16	43
2014	35	56	38	—N/a	—N/a	NC	34	25	—

==== Individual podiums ====
- 5 podiums

No.	Season	Date	Location	Race	Level	Place
1	2003–04	6 January 2004	Falun, Sweden	15 km + 15 km Pursuit C/F	World Cup	3rd
2	2004–05	11 December 2004	Lago di Tesero, Italy	15 km + 15 km Pursuit C/F	World Cup	2nd
3	2004–05	12 March 2005	Oslo, Norway	50 km Individual C	World Cup	2nd
4	2005–06	26 November 2005	Rukatunturi, Finland	15 km Individual C	World Cup	3rd
5	2005–06	17 December 2005	Canmore, Canada	30 km Mass Start C	World Cup	3rd

==== Team podiums ====
- 8 victories – (6 RL, 2 TS)
- 15 podiums – (13 RL, 2 TS)

No.	Season	Date	Location	Race	Level	Place	Teammate(s)
1	2002–03	19 January 2003	Nové Město, Czech Republic	4 × 10 km Relay C/F	World Cup	3rd	Schlütter / Angerer / Stitzl
2	2002–03	23 March 2003	Falun, Sweden	4 × 10 km Relay C/F	World Cup	3rd	Schlütter / Sommerfeldt / Teichmann
3	2003–04	23 November 2003	Beitostølen, Norway	4 × 10 km Relay C/F	World Cup	1st	Teichmann / Sommerfeldt / Angerer
4	2003–04	14 December 2003	Davos, Switzerland	4 × 10 km Relay C/F	World Cup	2nd	Schlütter / Sommerfeldt / Angerer
5	2003–04	11 January 2004	Otepää, Estonia	4 × 10 km Relay C/F	World Cup	1st	Schlütter / Teichmann / Angerer
6	2003–04	7 February 2004	La Clusaz, France	4 × 10 km Relay C/F	World Cup	2nd	Teichmann / Sommerfeldt / Angerer
7	2003–04	15 February 2004	Oberstdorf, Germany	6 × 1.2 km Team Sprint F	World Cup	1st	Teichmann
8	2003–04	22 February 2004	Umeå, Sweden	4 × 10 km Relay C/F	World Cup	1st	Göring / Schlütter / Teichmann
9	2004–05	21 November 2004	Gällivare, Sweden	4 × 10 km Relay C/F	World Cup	1st	Angerer / Sommerfeldt / Teichmann
10	2004–05	23 January 2005	Pragelato, Italy	6 × 1.2 km Team Sprint C	World Cup	1st	Teichmann
11	2005–06	29 November 2005	Beitostølen, Norway	4 × 10 km Relay C/F	World Cup	1st	Schlütter / Teichmann / Angerer
12	2005–06	15 January 2006	Lago di Tesero, Italy	4 × 10 km Relay C/F	World Cup	2nd	Sommerfeldt / Teichmann / Angerer
13	2005–06	19 November 2006	Gällivare, Sweden	4 × 10 km Relay C/F	World Cup	1st	Angerer / Göring / Teichmann
14	2008–09	23 November 2008	Gällivare, Sweden	4 × 10 km Relay C/F	World Cup	3rd	Angerer / Reichelt / Teichmann
15	2009–10	22 November 2009	Beitostølen, Norway	4 × 10 km Relay C/F	World Cup	3rd	Teichmann / Sommerfeldt / Angerer
