= Javier Gutiérrez Cuevas =

Spanish cross-country skier (born 1985)

Javier Gutiérrez Cuevas (born 29 March 1985 in Santander, Cantabria) is a Spanish cross-country skier who has competed since 2004. At the 2010 Winter Olympics in Vancouver, he finished 40th in the 30 km mixed pursuit, 69th in the 15 km events, and did not finish the 50 km event.

Gutierrez finished 67th in the 15 km event at the FIS Nordic World Ski Championships 2009 in Liberec.

His best World Cup finish was 19th in a 4 x 10 km relay at Norway in 2007 while his best individual finish was 61st in a 15 km event at Italy in 2009.

== Olympic results ==
Season	Date	Location	Discipline	Place
2010	15 Feb 2010	Vancouver, Canada	15km freestyle	69th
2010	20 Feb 2010	Vancouver, Canada	30km pursuit	40th
2010	28 Feb 2010	Vancouver, Canada	50km classical	DNF
2014	9 Feb 2014	Sochi, Russia	30km skiathlon	58th
2014	14 Feb 2014	Sochi, Russia	15km classical	63rd
2014	23 Feb 2014	Sochi, Russia	50km freestyle	47th
