= Aliaksei Ivanou =

Belarusian cross-country skier (born 1980)

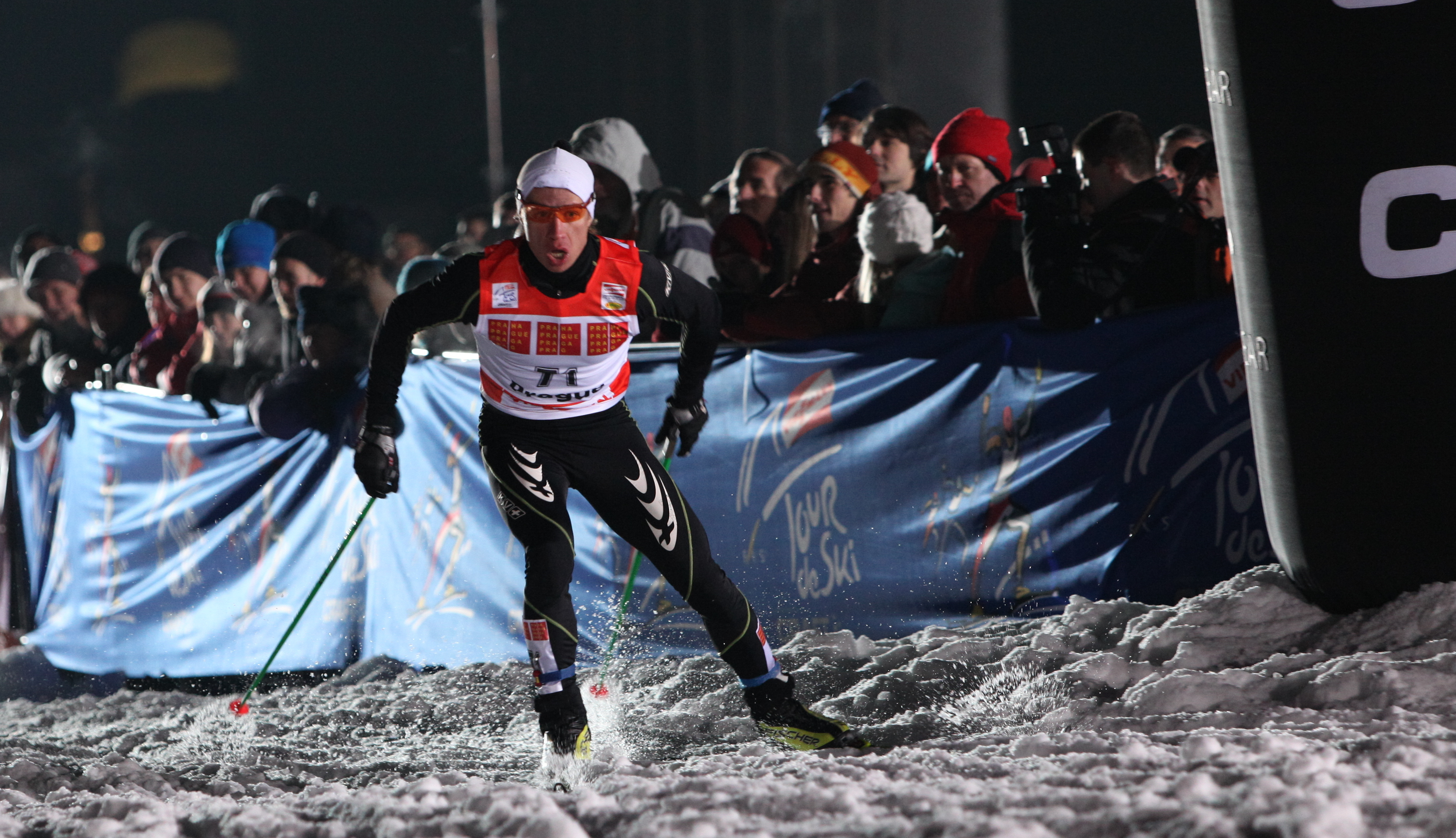
Aliaksei Ivanou in 2010

Aliaksei Ivanou (Belarusian: Аляксей Іваноў, Russian: Алексей Иванов) (born 17 May 1980) is a Belarusian cross-country skier who has competed swince 2004. At the 2010 Winter Olympics in Vancouver, he finished 45th in the 50 km, 48th in the 30 km mixed pursuit, and 60th in the 15 km events.

Iavnou's best finish at the FIS Nordic World Ski Championships was 13th in the 4 x 10 km relay at Sapporo in 2007 while his best individual finish was 36th in the 50 km event at those sam championships.

His best World Cup finish was ninth in a 4 x 10 km relay at Norway in 2009 while his best individual finish was 42nd in a 30 km event at France in 2006.
