= Benjamin Koons =

New Zealand cross-country skier (born 1986)

Benjamin Koons (born 9 April 1986) is a cross-country skier from New Zealand who has competed since 2004. He attended Messalonskee High School, and Dartmouth College. At the 2010 Winter Olympics, he finished 46th in the 50 km event. At the 2011 FIS World Championships in Oslo, Norway he finished 68th in the 15k Classic, 62nd in the 50k Skate, and 20th in the Team Sprint.
