= James Southam =

American cross-country skier (born 1978)

James Southam (born June 5, 1978, in Anchorage) is an American cross-country skier who has competed since 1998. His best individual World Cup finish was 22nd in a 15 km + 15 km double pursuit event at Whistler Olympic Park in January 2009. He races with the Alaska Pacific University Ski Center in Anchorage.

Competing in two Winter Olympics, he earned his best finish of 28th in the 50 km event at Vancouver in 2010. His best finish at the FIS Nordic World Ski Championships was 13th in the 4 x 10 km relay at Liberec in 2009 while his best individual finish was 33rd in the 15 km + 15 km double pursuit at those same championships.

Southam is a 4-time US national champion and 2-time Tour of Anchorage champion.
