= Jonas Thor Olsen =

Danish cross-country skier (born 1978)

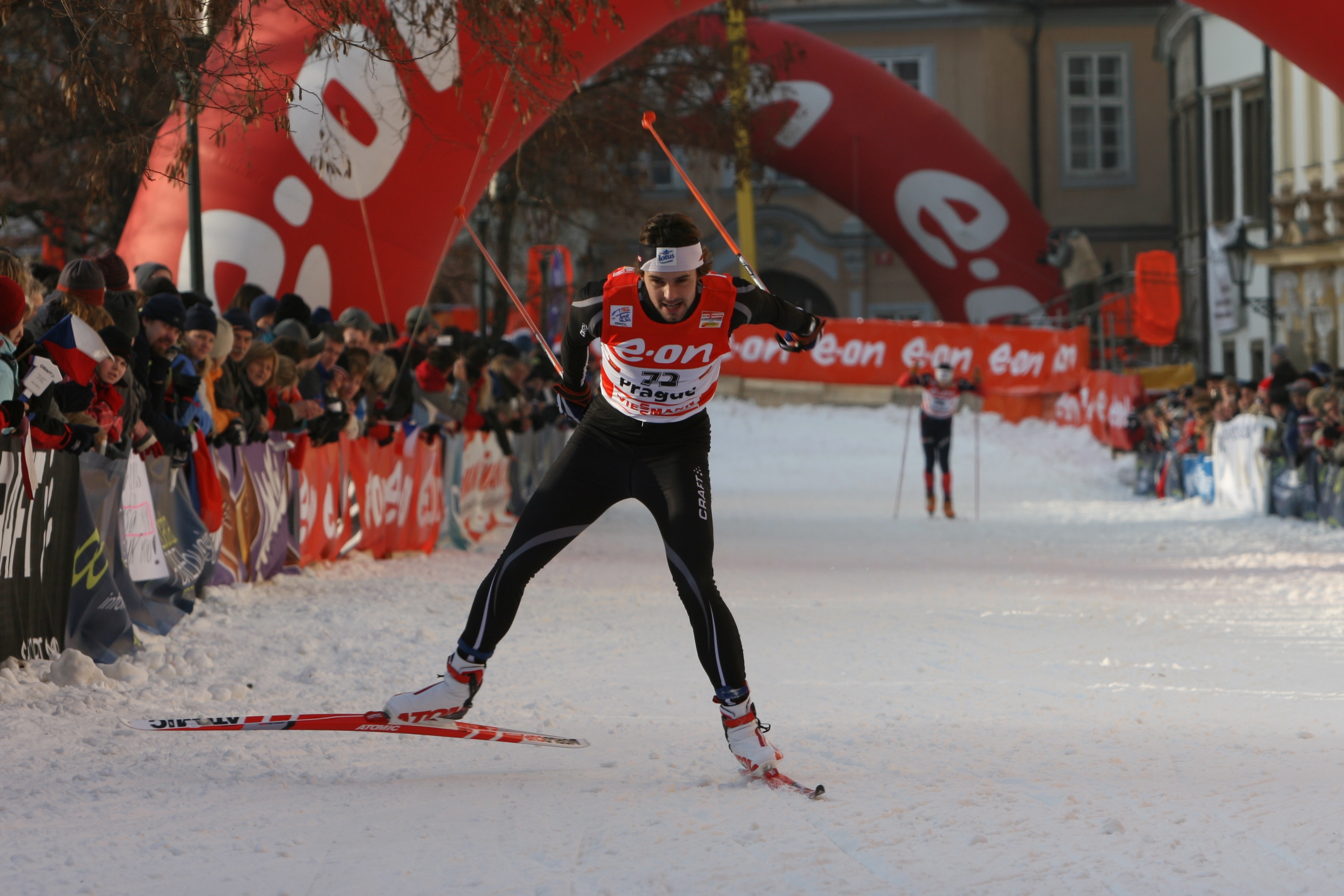
Jonas Thor Olsen competes at Tour de Ski in Prague (2007)

Jonas Thor Olsen (born 3 January 1978 in Nuuk) is a Danish cross-country skier who has competed since 1999. At the 2010 Winter Olympics in Vancouver, he finished 48th in the 50 km, 78th in the 15 km, and was lapped in the 30 km mixed pursuit events.

Thor Olson's best finish at the FIS Nordic World Ski Championships was 16th in the 4 x 10 km relay at Val di Fiemme in 2003. His best individual finish was 49th in the 50 km event at Liberec in 2009.

At the World Cup level, Thor Olsen's best finish was 23rd in the team sprint event at Düsseldorf in 2003. His best individual finish was 44th in the 50 km at Oslo in 2007.
