= Roman Leybyuk =

Ukrainian cross-country skier (born 1977)

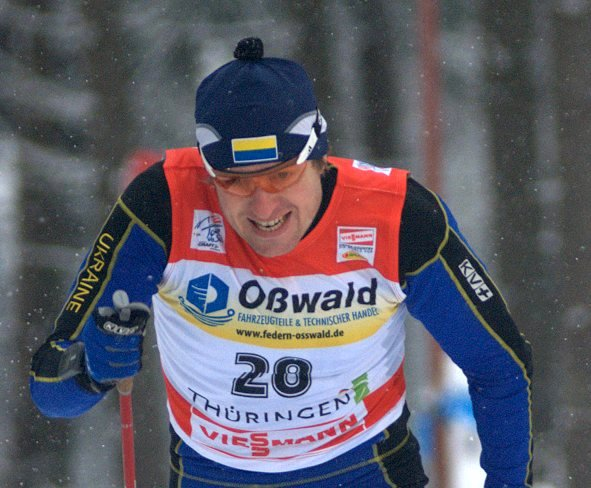
- Roman Leybyuk (Tour de Ski 2010)

Medal record

Men's cross-country skiing

Representing Ukraine

Winter Universiade
Gold medal – first place	2005 Innsbruck	10 km freestyle
Silver medal – second place	2001 Zakopane	Relay
Bronze medal – third place	2005 Innsbruck	Relay

Roman Leybyuk (born 16 January 1977 in Yaremche) is a Ukrainian cross-country skier who has competed since 1998. Competing in three Winter Olympics, he earned his best finish of 11th in the 10 km + 10 km combined pursuit at Salt Lake City in 2002.

Leybyuk's best finish at the FIS Nordic World Ski Championships was 14th in the 4 x 10 km relay at Val di Fiemme in 2003 while his best individual finish was 33rd twice (10 km: 1999, 15 km: 2005).

His best World cup finish was seventh at a 15 km event in Finland in 2004.
