= 2007–08 FIS Cross-Country World Cup Finals =

International skiing competition

2007–08 FIS Cross-Country World Cup

Ski tour details
- Venue(s): Bormio, Italy
- Dates: 14–16 March
- Stages: 3: Prologue F 10/20 km C Mass start 10/25 km F Pursuit

Results
Men
	Winner	Vincent Vittoz (FRA)
	Second	Lukáš Bauer (CZE)
	Third	Giorgio Di Centa (ITA)
Women
	Winner	Virpi Kuitunen (FIN)
	Second	Justyna Kowalczyk (POL)
	Third	Claudia Nystad (GER)

The 2007–08 FIS Cross-Country World Cup Finals were the 1st edition of the FIS Cross-Country World Cup Finals, an annual cross-country skiing mini-tour event. The three-day event was held in Bormio, Italy. It began on 14 March 2008 and concluded on 16 March 2008. It was the final competition round of the 2007–08 FIS Cross-Country World Cup.

Pietro Piller Cottrer of Italy and Claudia Nystad of Germany won the first stage of the mini-tour; a prologue freestyle. The second stage, a mass start in classic technique, did not count as an ordinary World Cup race as no World Cup points were awarded on the stage. However, the stage counted in the World Cup Final overall standings and was won by Vincent Vittoz in the men's competition and by Virpi Kuitunen among the women. Vittoz and Kuitunen both lead the overall standings after two stages and both won the World Cup Final overall by defending their positions on the third stage.

== Overall leadership ==
Bonus seconds for the top 30 positions by type
Type		1	2	3	4	5	6	7	8	9	10	11	12	13–15	16–20	21–25	26–30
Finish	Prologue	15	10	5	none												
Finish	Mass start	15	10	5	none												
Finish	Pursuit	none															
Intermediate sprint	Mass start	15	10	5	none												

The results in the overall standings were calculated by adding each rider's finishing times on each stage. On the two first stages, the winners were awarded 15 bonus seconds. On the second stage, the three first skiers to pass the intermediate sprint points were also awarded bonus seconds. No bonus seconds were awarded on the third stage. The skier with the lowest cumulative time was the overall winner of the Cross-Country World Cup Finals.

Overall leadership by stage
Stage	Men		Women	
Stage	Winner	Overall standings	Winner	Overall standings
1	Pietro Piller Cottrer	Pietro Piller Cottrer	Claudia Nystad	Claudia Nystad
2	Vincent Vittoz	Vincent Vittoz	Virpi Kuitunen	Virpi Kuitunen
3 Pursuit		Vincent Vittoz	3 Pursuit	Virpi Kuitunen

== Overall standings ==
Men's overall standings (1–10)
Rank	Name	Time
1	Vincent Vittoz (FRA)	1:39:08.3
2	Lukáš Bauer (CZE)	+1:10.2
3	Giorgio Di Centa (ITA)	+1:58.5
4	Pietro Piller Cottrer (ITA)	+1:58.9
5	Sami Jauhojärvi (FIN)	+1:59.0
6	Petter Northug (NOR)	+2:19.9
7	Tord Asle Gjerdalen (NOR)	+2:32.2
8	Roland Clara (ITA)	+2:44.6
9	Jens Filbrich (GER)	+2:53.7
10	Ville Nousiainen (FIN)	+3:21.7

Final overall standings (11–63)
Rank	Name	Time
11	Thomas Moriggl (ITA)	+3:30.1
12	René Sommerfeldt (GER)	+3:31.2
13	Valerio Checchi (ITA)	+3:46.8
14	Matti Heikkinen (FIN)	+3:53.7
15	Simen Østensen (NOR)	+4:11.4
16	Martin Bajčičák (SVK)	+4:25.8
17	Martin Jakš (CZE)	+4:25.9
18	Christian Hoffmann (AUT)	+4:52.4
19	Tobias Angerer (GER)	+4:52.6
20	Fabio Santus (ITA)	+4:52.7
21	Thomas Diezig (SUI)	+4:52.9
22	Andrus Veerpalu (EST)	+4:53.3
23	Devon Kershaw (CAN)	+4:53.7
24	Ivan Bátory (SVK)	+4:55.9
25	Anders Södergren (SWE)	+4:56.0
26	Emmanuel Jonnier (FRA)	+4:59.2
27	Dušan Kožíšek (CZE)	+5:11.4
28	Jaak Mae (EST)	+5:11.8
29	Curdin Perl (SUI)	+5:12.2
30	Yevgeny Dementyev (RUS)	+5:12.6
31	Sergey Cherepanov (KAZ)	+5:12.7
32	Toni Livers (SUI)	+5:19.0
33	Alexander Legkov (RUS)	+5:19.7
34	Martin Koukal (CZE)	+5:54.0
35	Nikolay Pankratov (RUS)	+5:54.1
36	Remo Fischer (SUI)	+5:55.3
37	Martin Johnsrud Sundby (NOR)	+6:08.8
38	Nikolay Chebotko (KAZ)	+6:14.4
39	Maurice Manificat (FRA)	+6:29.4
40	Dario Cologna (SUI)	+6:35.8
41	Jens Arne Svartedal (NOR)	+6:41.9
42	Alexandre Rousselet (FRA)	+6:42.0
43	Alexey Poltoranin (KAZ)	+6:57.0
44	John Kristian Dahl (NOR)	+7:06.3
45	Martin Stockinger (AUT)	+8:40.5
46	Aivar Rehemaa (EST)	+8:44.1
47	Christophe Perrillat (FRA)	+4:52.7
48	Vicenç Vilarrubla (ESP)	+9:41.2
49	Andrey Parfenov (RUS)	+9:46.6
50	Emil Jönsson (SWE)	+9:54.7
51	Vasily Rochev (RUS)	+10:07.3
52	Manuel Hirner (AUT)	+10:14.6
53	Cyril Miranda (FRA)	+10:16.1
54	Shohei Honda (JPN)	+10:32.0
55	Janusz Krężelok (POL)	+11:09.8
56	Masaya Kimura (JPN)	+11:29.9
57	Ivan Alypov (RUS)	+11:59.3
58	François Soulié (AND)	+12:42.0
59	Ivan Ivanov (RUS)	+13:41.1
60	Josef Wenzl (GER)	+14:10.3
61	Javier Gutiérrez (ESP)	+14:43.7
62	Alexandr Ionenkow (BLR)	+16:19.7
63	Jonas Thor Olsen (DEN)	+17:11.8

Women's overall standings (1–10)
Rank	Name	Time
1	Virpi Kuitunen (FIN)	1:08:49.9
2	Justyna Kowalczyk (POL)	+0.3
3	Claudia Nystad (GER)	+39.6
4	Valentyna Shevchenko (UKR)	+1:02.5
5	Marianna Longa (ITA)	+1:14.1
6	Marit Bjørgen (NOR)	+1:26.0
7	Astrid Jacobsen (NOR)	+1:27.7
8	Arianna Follis (ITA)	+1:28.1
9	Katrin Zeller (GER)	+1:28.1
10	Riitta-Liisa Roponen (FIN)	+2:00.0

Final overall standings (11–58)
Rank	Name	Time
11	Aino-Kaisa Saarinen (FIN)	+2:03.3
12	Seraina Mischol (SUI)	+2:04.1
13	Petra Majdič (SLO)	+2:07.8
14	Sabina Valbusa (ITA)	+2:31.7
15	Kristin Størmer Steira (NOR)	+2:37.5
16	Antonella Confortola (ITA)	+2:48.1
17	Evi Sachenbacher-Stehle (GER)	+2:58.3
18	Charlotte Kalla (SWE)	+3:11.7
19	Sara Svendsen (NOR)	+3:11.8
20	Olga Rocheva (RUS)	+2:50.4
21	Therese Johaug (NOR)	+3:17.9
22	Stefanie Böhler (GER)	+3:18.7
23	Larisa Kurkina (RUS)	+3:47.8
24	Coraline Hugue (FRA)	+3:48.1
25	Yevgeniya Medvedeva (RUS)	+3:59.1
26	Marthe Kristoffersen (NOR)	+4:12.1
27	Kristin Mürer Stemland (NOR)	+4:12.6
28	Riikka Sarasoja (FIN)	+4:12.6
29	Alena Procházková (SVK)	+4:16.0
30	Silvana Bucher (SUI)	+4:23.3
31	Yuliya Chekalyova (RUS)	+4:25.1
32	Karine Laurent Philippot (FRA)	+4:32.9
33	Kateřina Smutná (AUT)	+4:46.7
34	Helena Erbenová (CZE)	+4:46.9
35	Elisa Brocard (ITA)	+5:03.6
36	Ingrid Aunet Tyldum (NOR)	+5:12.7
37	Diana Sapronova (RUS)	+5:33.7
38	Alena Sannikova (BLR)	+5:53.1
39	Olga Tiagai (RUS)	+6:07.9
40	Nicole Fessel (GER)	+6:18.5
41	Tatjana Mannima (EST)	+6:19.9
42	Marte Elden (NOR)	+6:21.3
43	Pirjo Muranen (FIN)	+6:21.7
44	Sylwia Jaśkowiec (POL)	+6:26.7
45	Lada Nesterenko (UKR)	+6:35.0
46	Anouk Faivre-Picon (FRA)	+6:35.5
47	Laure Barthélémy (FRA)	+6:36.9
48	Magda Genuin (ITA)	+6:47.3
49	Madoka Natsumi (JPN)	+7:16.9
50	Stephanie Santer (ITA)	+7:30.5
51	Ursina Badilatti (SUI)	+7:46.4
52	Silja Tarvonen (FIN)	+7:47.3
53	Vesna Fabjan (SLO)	+7:55.4
54	Yuliya Chepalova (RUS)	+8:15.6
55	Tatyana Shedenko (KAZ)	+8:33.8
56	Kornelia Marek (POL)	+8:39.0
57	Paulina Maciuszek (POL)	+11:27.0
58	Yuki Kobayashi (JPN)	+13:16.6

== Stages ==
=== Stage 1 ===
14 March 2020

- Bonus seconds in finish: 15–10–5 to the 3 first skiers crossing the finish line.

Men – 3.3 km Prologue Freestyle (individual)
Rank	Name	Time	BS
1	Pietro Piller Cottrer (ITA)	8:31.7	15
2	Tord Asle Gjerdalen (NOR)	+0.1	10
3	Martin Jakš (CZE)	+1.8	5
4	Dario Cologna (SUI)	+2.5	
5	Giorgio Di Centa (ITA)	+3.4	
6	Anders Södergren (SWE)	+3.9	
7	Vincent Vittoz (FRA)	+4.6	
8	Petter Northug (NOR)	+6.0	
9	Martin Koukal (CZE)	+8.0	
10	Lukáš Bauer (CZE)	+8.8	

Women – 3.3 km Prologue Freestyle (individual)
Rank	Name	Time	BS
1	Claudia Nystad (GER)	7:46.4	15
2	Astrid Jacobsen (NOR)	+5.6	10
3	Riitta-Liisa Roponen (FIN)	+9.3	5
4	Virpi Kuitunen (FIN)	+13.4	
5	Petra Majdič (SLO)	+14.2	
6	Stefanie Böhler (GER)	+16.2	
7	Valentyna Shevchenko (UKR)	+18.3	
8	Arianna Follis (ITA)	+18.9	
9	Seraina Mischol (SUI)	+20.4	
10	Aino-Kaisa Saarinen (FIN)	+23.9	

=== Stage 2 ===
15 March 2008

- Does not count as World Cup race as no World Cup points were awarded.

Men – 20 km Classic (mass start)
Rank	Name	Time	BS
1	Vincent Vittoz (FRA)	51:27.5	75
2	Lukáš Bauer (CZE)	+18.3	40
3	Tord Asle Gjerdalen (NOR)	+52.1	10
4	Valerio Checchi (ITA)	+1:05.7	5
5	Simen Østensen (NOR)	+1:20.5	
6	Jens Filbrich (GER)	+1:24.1	5
7	Sami Jauhojärvi (FIN)	+1:30.6	
8	Petter Northug (NOR)	+1:31.0	
9	Giorgio Di Centa (ITA)	+1:32.7	5
10	Pietro Piller Cottrer (ITA)	+1:44.4	

Women – 10 km Classic (mass start)
Rank	Name	Time	BS
1	Virpi Kuitunen (FIN)	30:52.0	30
2	Justyna Kowalczyk (POL)	+0.6	40
3	Marit Bjørgen (NOR)	+3.0	10
4	Marianna Longa (ITA)	+6.8	
5	Claudia Nystad (GER)	+26.0	
6	Katrin Zeller (GER)	+27.9	
7	Arianna Follis (ITA)	+30.1	
8	Kristin Størmer Steira (NOR)	+35.3	
9	Petra Majdič (SLO)	+44.2	
10	Valentyna Shevchenko (UKR)	+53.4	10

==== Stage 2 bonus seconds ====
- Men: 4 intermediate sprints, bonus seconds to the 3 first skiers (15–10–5) past the intermediate points.
- Women: 2 intermediate sprints, bonus seconds to the 3 first skiers (15–10–5) past the intermediate point.
- Bonus seconds in finish: 15–10–5 to the 3 first skiers crossing the finish line.

Bonus seconds (Stage 2 – Men)
Name	Point 1	Point 2	Point 3	Point 4	Finish	Total
Vincent Vittoz (FRA)	15	15	15	15	15	75
Lukáš Bauer (CZE)		10	10	10	10	40
Martin Jakš (CZE)	10					10
Tord Asle Gjerdalen (NOR)				5	5	10
Giorgio Di Centa (ITA)	5					5
Jens Filbrich (GER)		5				5
Valerio Checchi (ITA)			5			5

Bonus seconds (Stage 2 – Women)
Name	Point 1	Point 2	Finish	Total
Justyna Kowalczyk (POL)	15	15	10	40
Virpi Kuitunen (FIN)	5	10	15	30
Valentyna Shevchenko (UKR)	10			10
Marit Bjørgen (NOR)		5	5	10

=== Stage 3 ===
16 March 2019

- The race for "Winner of the Day" did not receive 2007–08 FIS Cross-Country World Cup points. Therefore, pursuit results are presented. No bonus seconds were awarded on this stage.

Men – 15 km Freestyle (pursuit)
Rank	Name	Time
1	Vincent Vittoz (FRA)	40:19.5
2	Lukáš Bauer (CZE)	+1:10.2
3	Giorgio Di Centa (ITA)	+1:58.5
4	Pietro Piller Cottrer (ITA)	+1:58.9
5	Sami Jauhojärvi (FIN)	+1:59.0
6	Petter Northug (NOR)	+2:19.9
7	Tord Asle Gjerdalen (NOR)	+2:32.2
8	Roland Clara (ITA)	+2:44.6
9	Jens Filbrich (GER)	+2:53.7
10	Ville Nousiainen (FIN)	+3:21.7

Women – 10 km Freestyle (pursuit)
Rank	Name	Time
1	Virpi Kuitunen (FIN)	30:28.1
2	Justyna Kowalczyk (POL)	+0.3
3	Claudia Nystad (GER)	+39.6
4	Valentyna Shevchenko (UKR)	+1:02.5
5	Marianna Longa (ITA)	+1:14.1
6	Marit Bjørgen (NOR)	+1:26.0
7	Astrid Jacobsen (NOR)	+1:27.7
8	Arianna Follis (ITA)	+1:28.1
9	Katrin Zeller (GER)	+1:28.1
10	Riitta-Liisa Roponen (FIN)	+2:00.0

== World Cup points distribution ==
The overall winners are awarded 200 points. The winners of each of the first stage are awarded 100 points. The maximum number of points an athlete can earn is therefore 300 points.

Position	1	2	3	4	5	6	7	8	9	10	11	12	13	14	15	16	17	18	19	20	21	22	23	24	25	26	27	28	29	30
Overall	200	160	120	100	90	80	72	64	58	52	48	44	40	36	32	30	28	26	24	22	20	18	16	14	12	10	8	6	4	2
Stage 1	100	80	60	50	45	40	36	32	29	26	24	22	20	18	16	15	14	13	12	11	10	9	8	7	6	5	4	3	2	1
Stage 2 and 3	none																													
