= 2007–08 Tour de Ski =

Cross-country skiing event

Tour de Ski
2007–08 FIS Cross-Country World Cup

Ski tour details
- Venue(s): Nové Město, Czech Republic; Prague, Czech Republic; Asiago, Italy; Val di Fiemme, Italy
- Dates: 28 December 2007 – 6 January 2008
- Stages: 8

Results
Men
Jersey awarded to the men's overall winner	Winner	Lukáš Bauer (CZE)
	Second	René Sommerfeldt (GER)
	Third	Giorgio Di Centa (ITA)
Jersey awarded to the men's sprint classification winner	Sprint	Petter Northug (NOR)
Women
Jersey awarded to the women's overall winner	Winner	Charlotte Kalla (SWE)
	Second	Virpi Kuitunen (FIN)
	Third	Arianna Follis (ITA)
Jersey awarded to the women's sprint classification winner	Sprint	Virpi Kuitunen (FIN)

The 2007–08 Tour de Ski was the 2nd edition of the Tour de Ski and took place from 28 December 2007 until 6 January 2008. The race kicked off in Nové Město, the Czech Republic, and finished in Val di Fiemme, Italy, ten days later. It featured 8 top international cross-country skiing competitions, of which two were sprint events.

== Women ==
=== Final standings ===
==== Overall standings ====
#	Name	Nation	Time	Ranking per stage								WC Points
#	Name	Nation	Time	1	2	3	4	5	6	7	8	WC Points
1	Charlotte Kalla	SWE	2:43:01.0	7	1	16	1	6	1	2	9	400 pts
2	Virpi Kuitunen	FIN	+36.4	1	22	5	12	2	11	1	21	320 pts
3	Arianna Follis	ITA	+53.3	11	7	1	14	9	4	10	7	240 pts
4	Valentyna Shevchenko	UKR	+1:09.2	9	11	42	8	5	31	17	1	200 pts
5	Olga Rocheva	RUS	+1:14.8	8	8	18	7	4	5	4	16	180 pts
6	Claudia Künzel-Nystad	GER	+2:07.8	22	17	9	3	27	13	3	3	160 pts
7	Justyna Kowalczyk	POL	+2:20.8	3	15	6	9	8	3	26	18	144 pts
8	Evi Sachenbacher-Stehle	GER	+2:23.8	13	9	15	6	23	17	6	10	128 pts
9	Katrin Zeller	GER	+2:29.8	17	6	19	16	13	20	5	6	116 pts
10	Riitta-Liisa Roponen	FIN	+2:31.7	19	4	12	13	22	8	20	8	104 pts
11	Kristin Størmer Steira	NOR	+2:42.9	=24	19	31	2	14	32	9	2	96 pts
12	Seraina Mischol	SUI	+2:58.7	5	12	7	19	11	16	13	13	88 pts
13	Anna Hansson	SWE	+3:22.7	12	5	39	15	17	27	7	11	80 pts
14	Therese Johaug	NOR	+3:33.7	10	27	44	22	3	29	15	4	72 pts
15	Pirjo Muranen	FIN	+3:49.2	31	28	2	20	12	7	8	20	64 pts
16	Astrid Uhrenholdt Jacobsen	NOR	+4:00.1	18	14	11	10	10	6	27	23	60 pts
17	Aino-Kaisa Saarinen	FIN	+4:07.1	2	23	14	28	1	22	23	25	56 pts
18	Petra Majdič	SLO	+4:36.0	20	25	13	18	7	15	14	22	52 pts
19	Sabina Valbusa	ITA	+5:01.9	23	2	20	21	25	23	25	15	48 pts
20	Larisa Kurkina	RUS	+5:02.3	=15	21	35	25	19	30	11	17	44 pts
21	Antonella Confortola	ITA	+5:07.2	29	16	40	17	28	33	16	12	40 pts
22	Natalya Korostelyova	RUS	+5:29.8	32	13	10	4	18	2	18	42	36 pts
23	Stefanie Böhler	GER	+5:30.6	21	20	34	5	37	18	34	5	32 pts
24	Yevgeniya Medvedeva	RUS	+6:50.0	=27	24	=46	24	32	28	21	14	28 pts
25	Alena Procházková	SVK	+7:53.8	42	26	8	36	24	10	19	33	24 pts
26	Kristin Mürer Stemland	NOR	+8:13.2	26	18	43	30	26	36	28	30	20 pts
27	Kateřina Smutná	AUT	+8:21.2	=15	36	21	34	21	19	12	34	16 pts
28	Yuliya Chekalyova	RUS	+8:53.3	33	29	51	31	29	40	22	26	12 pts
29	Yuliya Ivanova	RUS	+9:07.2	6	32	33	23	16	24	31	41	8 pts
30	Magda Genuin	ITA	+9:59.1	30	41	4	33	31	9	35	35	4 pts
-	Marit Bjørgen	NOR	-	4*	3*	3*	27*	20*		DNS	DNS	pts

*Marit Bjørgen was leading Tour de Ski after the second and third stages but had to pull out after stage 6, as she had contracted a virus infection. Source:

==== Sprint Standings ====
Women's sprint standings (1–10)
Rank	Name	Bonus
1	Virpi Kuitunen (FIN)	156s
2	Arianna Follis (ITA)	109s
3	Pirjo Muranen (FIN)	106s
4	Justyna Kowalczyk (POL)	99s
5	Natalya Korostelyova (RUS)	90s
6	Charlotte Kalla (SWE)	85s
7	Magda Genuin (ITA)	85s
8	Aino-Kaisa Saarinen (FIN)	76s
9	Astrid Uhrenholdt Jacobsen (NOR)	74s
10	Alena Procházková (SVK)	72s

=== Stages ===
==== Stage 1 ====
Prologue - December 28; 3.3 km classical, individual start; Nové Město, Czech Republic

Stage result

#	Name	Nation	Time	WC Points
1	Virpi Kuitunen	FIN	9:22.8	50 pts.
2	Aino-Kaisa Saarinen	FIN	+ 0.7	40 pts.
3	Justyna Kowalczyk	POL	+ 1.9	30 pts.
4	Marit Bjørgen	NOR	+ 6.1	
5	Seraina Mischol	SUI	+ 13.0	23 pts.
6	Yuliya Ivanova	RUS	+ 14.4	20 pts.
7	Charlotte Kalla	SWE	+ 14.5	18 pts.
8	Olga Rocheva	RUS	+ 14.8	16 pts.
9	Valentyna Shevchenko	UKR	+ 15.3	14 pts.
10	Therese Johaug	NOR	+ 15.8	13 pts.
11	Arianna Follis	ITA	+ 17.2	12 pts.
12	Anna Hansson	SWE	+ 17.4	11 pts.
13	Evi Sachenbacher-Stehle	GER	+ 18.8	10 pts.
14	Vibeke Skofterud	NOR	+ 19.7	
15	Kateřina Smutná	AUT	+ 20.4	8 pts.
15	Larisa Kurkina	RUS	+ 20.4	8 pts.

Tour de Ski standings

#	Name	Nation	Time
1	Virpi Kuitunen	FIN	9:07.8
2	Aino-Kaisa Saarinen	FIN	+ 5.7
3	Justyna Kowalczyk	POL	+ 11.9
4	Marit Bjørgen	NOR	+ 21.1
5	Seraina Mischol	SUI	+ 28.0

Sprint standings

#	Name	Nation	Points
1	Virpi Kuitunen	FIN	15
2	Aino-Kaisa Saarinen	FIN	10
3	Justyna Kowalczyk	POL	5

==== Stage 2 ====
December 29; 10 km free technique, pursuit; Nové Město, Czech Republic

Stage result

#	Name	Nation	Time	WC Points
1	Charlotte Kalla	SWE	25:47.9	50 pts.
2	Sabina Valbusa	ITA	+ 2.1	40 pts.
3	Marit Bjørgen	NOR	+ 8.2	
4	Riitta-Liisa Roponen	FIN	+ 9.3	25 pts.
5	Anna Hansson	SWE	+ 12.7	23 pts.
6	Katrin Zeller	GER	+ 13.5	20 pts.
7	Arianna Follis	ITA	+ 14.5	18 pts.
8	Olga Rocheva	RUS	+ 14.8	16 pts.
9	Evi Sachenbacher-Stehle	GER	+ 15.1	14 pts.
10	Vibeke Skofterud	NOR	+ 16.6	
11	Valentyna Shevchenko	UKR	+ 18.2	12 pts.
12	Seraina Mischol	SUI	+ 19.2	11 pts.
13	Natalya Korostelyova	RUS	+ 21.5	10 pts.
14	Astrid Uhrenholdt Jacobsen	NOR	+ 22.0	9 pts.
15	Justyna Kowalczyk	POL	+ 24.6	8 pts.

Tour de Ski standings

#	Name	Nation	Time
1	Marit Bjørgen	NOR	35:25.0
2	Charlotte Kalla	SWE	+ 0.2
3	Justyna Kowalczyk	POL	+ 15.0
4	Virpi Kuitunen	FIN	+ 15.3
5	Olga Rocheva	RUS	+ 15.8

Sprint standings

#	Name	Nation	Points
1	Virpi Kuitunen	FIN	15
2	Aino-Kaisa Saarinen	FIN	10
3	Justyna Kowalczyk	POL	5

==== Stage 3 ====
December 30; 1.0 km free technique, sprint; Prague, Czech Republic

Stage result

#	Name	Nation	Time	WC Points
1	Arianna Follis	ITA	1:50.5	50 pts.
2	Pirjo Muranen	FIN	+ 0.2	40 pts.
3	Marit Bjørgen	NOR	+ 0.7	
4	Magda Genuin	ITA	+ 1.0	25 pts.
5	Virpi Kuitunen	FIN	+ 2.0	23 pts.
6	Justyna Kowalczyk	POL	+ 10.9	20 pts.
B Final
7	Seraina Mischol	SUI	1:51.3	18 pts.
8	Alena Procházková	SVK	+ 0.1	16 pts.
9	Claudia Künzel-Nystad	GER	+ 0.6	14 pts.
10	Natalya Korostelyova	RUS	+ 0.8	13 pts.
11	Astrid Uhrenholdt Jacobsen	NOR	+ 1.1	12 pts.
12	Riitta-Liisa Roponen	FIN	+ 1.3	11 pts.
Eliminated in the Quarter-final
13	Petra Majdič	SLO	-	10 pts.
14	Aino-Kaisa Saarinen	FIN	-	9 pts.
15	Evi Sachenbacher-Stehle	GER	-	8 pts.

Tour de Ski standings

#	Name	Nation	Time
1	Marit Bjørgen	NOR	36:25.6
2	Arianna Follis	ITA	+ 9.4
3	Justyna Kowalczyk	POL	+ 22.0
4	Virpi Kuitunen	FIN	+ 23.5
5	Seraina Mischol	SUI	+ 31.5

Sprint standings

#	Name	Nation	Points
1	Arianna Follis	ITA	60
2	Virpi Kuitunen	FIN	59
3	Pirjo Muranen	FIN	56
4	Marit Bjørgen	NOR	52
5	Magda Genuin	ITA	49
6	Justyna Kowalczyk	POL	47

==== Stage 4 ====
January 1; 10 km free technique, pursuit; Nové Město, Czech Republic

Stage result

#	Name	Nation	Time	WC Points
1	Charlotte Kalla	SWE	26:21.9	50 pts.
2	Kristin Størmer Steira	NOR	+ 3.0	40 pts.
3	Claudia Künzel-Nystad	GER	+ 4.2	30 pts.
4	Natalya Korostelyova	RUS	+ 5.0	25 pts.
5	Stefanie Böhler	GER	+ 8.7	23 pts.
6	Evi Sachenbacher-Stehle	GER	+ 11.7	20 pts.
7	Olga Rocheva	RUS	+ 11.8	18 pts.
8	Valentyna Shevchenko	UKR	+ 14.8	16 pts.
9	Justyna Kowalczyk	POL	+ 26.1	14 pts.
10	Astrid Uhrenholdt Jacobsen	NOR	+ 27.3	13 pts.
11	Vibeke Skofterud	NOR	+ 31.5	
12	Virpi Kuitunen	FIN	+ 32.1	11 pts.
13	Riitta-Liisa Roponen	FIN	+ 33.4	10 pts.
14	Arianna Follis	ITA	+ 37.1	9 pts.
15	Anna Hansson	SWE	+ 40.0	8 pts.

Tour de Ski standings

#	Name	Nation	Time
1	Charlotte Kalla	SWE	1:03:25.5
2	Arianna Follis	ITA	+ 8.5
3	Justyna Kowalczyk	POL	+ 10.1
4	Virpi Kuitunen	FIN	+ 17.6
5	Claudia Künzel-Nystad	GER	+ 30.8

Sprint standings

#	Name	Nation	Points
1	Arianna Follis	ITA	60
2	Virpi Kuitunen	FIN	59
3	Pirjo Muranen	FIN	56
4	Marit Bjørgen	NOR	52
5	Magda Genuin	ITA	49
6	Justyna Kowalczyk	POL	47

==== Stage 5 ====
January 2; 10 km classical, individual start; Nové Město, Czech Republic

Stage result

#	Name	Nation	Time	WC Points
1	Aino-Kaisa Saarinen	FIN	28:55.7	50 pts.
2	Virpi Kuitunen	FIN	+ 2.6	40 pts.
3	Therese Johaug	NOR	+ 13.3	30 pts.
4	Olga Rocheva	RUS	+ 14.3	25 pts.
5	Valentyna Shevchenko	UKR	+ 23.0	23 pts.
6	Charlotte Kalla	SWE	+ 25.2	20 pts.
7	Petra Majdič	SLO	+ 25.3	18 pts.
8	Justyna Kowalczyk	POL	+ 32.2	16 pts.
9	Arianna Follis	ITA	+ 47.9	14 pts.
10	Astrid Uhrenholdt Jacobsen	NOR	+ 49.7	13 pts.
11	Seraina Mischol	SUI	+ 53.0	12 pts.
12	Pirjo Muranen	FIN	+ 54.4	11 pts.
13	Katrin Zeller	GER	+ 55.9	10 pts.
14	Kristin Størmer Steira	NOR	+ 58.6	9 pts.
15	Vibeke Skofterud	NOR	+ 58.8	

Tour de Ski standings

#	Name	Nation	Time
1	Virpi Kuitunen	FIN	1:32:21.4
2	Charlotte Kalla	SWE	+ 25.0
3	Justyna Kowalczyk	POL	+42.1
4	Olga Rocheva	RUS	+ 45.7
5	Arianna Follis	ITA	+ 56.2

Sprint standings

#	Name	Nation	Points
1	Virpi Kuitunen	FIN	79
2	Arianna Follis	ITA	60
3	Aino-Kaisa Saarinen	FIN	57
4	Pirjo Muranen	FIN	56
5	Marit Bjørgen	NOR	52
6	Magda Genuin	ITA	49
7	Justyna Kowalczyk	POL	47

==== Stage 6 ====
January 4; 1.2 km free technique, sprint; Asiago, Italy

Stage result

#	Name	Nation	Time	WC Points
1	Charlotte Kalla	SWE	2:51.0	50 pts.
2	Natalya Korostelyova	RUS	+ 0.6	40 pts.
3	Justyna Kowalczyk	POL	+ 1.2	30 pts.
4	Arianna Follis	ITA	+ 1.2	25 pts.
5	Olga Rocheva	RUS	+ 3.9	23 pts.
6	Astrid Uhrenholdt Jacobsen	NOR	+ 14.3	20 pts.
B Final
7	Pirjo Muranen	FIN	2:55.3	18 pts.
8	Riitta-Liisa Roponen	FIN	+ 0.7	16 pts.
9	Magda Genuin	ITA	+ 2.5	14 pts.
10	Alena Procházková	SVK	+ 3.3	13 pts.
11	Virpi Kuitunen	FIN	+ 3.4	12 pts.
12	Vesna Fabjan	SLO	+ 3.4	11 pts.
Eliminated in the Quarter-final
13	Claudia Künzel-Nystad	GER	-	10 pts.
14	Natalya Ilyina	RUS	-	9 pts.
15	Petra Majdič	SLO	-	8 pts.

Tour de Ski standings

#	Name	Nation	Time
1	Virpi Kuitunen	FIN	1:34:41.3
2	Charlotte Kalla	SWE	+ 0.2
3	Justyna Kowalczyk	POL	+ 23.7
4	Olga Rocheva	RUS	+ 36.1
5	Arianna Follis	ITA	+ 38.2

Sprint standings

#	Name	Nation	Points
1	Virpi Kuitunen	FIN	111
2	Arianna Follis	ITA	109
3	Justyna Kowalczyk	POL	99
4	Pirjo Muranen	FIN	96
5	Natalya Korostelyova	RUS	90
6	Magda Genuin	ITA	85
7	Charlotte Kalla	SWE	75
8	Astrid Uhrenholdt Jacobsen	NOR	74

==== Stage 7 ====
January 5; 10 km classical, mass start; Val di Fiemme, Italy

Stage result

#	Name	Nation	Time	WC Points
1	Virpi Kuitunen	FIN	32:48.1	50 pts.
2	Charlotte Kalla	SWE	+ 4.5	40 pts.
3	Claudia Künzel-Nystad	GER	+ 5.0	30 pts.
4	Olga Rocheva	RUS	+ 5.1	25 pts.
5	Katrin Zeller	GER	+ 5.5	23 pts.
6	Evi Sachenbacher-Stehle	GER	+ 5.6	20 pts.
7	Anna Hansson	SWE	+ 5.7	18 pts.
8	Pirjo Muranen	FIN	+ 12.4	16 pts.
9	Kristin Størmer Steira	NOR	+ 13.0	14 pts.
10	Arianna Follis	ITA	+ 13.2	13 pts.
11	Larisa Kurkina	RUS	+ 17.2	12 pts.
12	Kateřina Smutná	AUT	+ 20.5	11 pts.
13	Seraina Mischol	SUI	+ 28.3	10 pts.
14	Petra Majdič	SLO	+ 28.8	9 pts.
15	Therese Johaug	NOR	+ 29.4	8 pts.

Tour de Ski standings

#	Name	Nation	Time
1	Virpi Kuitunen	FIN	2:06:44.4
2	Charlotte Kalla	SWE	+ 39.7
3	Olga Rocheva	RUS	+ 1:26.2
4	Arianna Follis	ITA	+ 1:36.4
5	Justyna Kowalczyk	POL	+ 2:19.1
6	Natalya Korostelyova	RUS	+ 2:39.7

Sprint standings

#	Name	Nation	Points
1	Virpi Kuitunen	FIN	156
2	Arianna Follis	ITA	109
3	Pirjo Muranen	FIN	106
4	Justyna Kowalczyk	POL	99
5	Natalya Korostelyova	RUS	90

==== Stage 8 ====
Final Climb - January 6; 10 km free technique, pursuit; Val di Fiemme, Italy

Stage result

#	Name	Nation	Time	WC Points
1	Valentyna Shevchenko	UKR	34:06.2	50 pts.
2	Kristin Størmer Steira	NOR	+55.3	40 pts.
3	Claudia Künzel-Nystad	GER	+1:10.8	30 pts.
4	Therese Johaug	NOR	+1:16.5	25 pts.
5	Stefanie Böhler	GER	+1:17.3	23 pts.
6	Katrin Zeller	GER	+1:25.0	20 pts.
7	Arianna Follis	ITA	+1:27.3	18 pts.
8	Riitta-Liisa Roponen	FIN	+1:29.1	16 pts.
9	Charlotte Kalla	SWE	+1:30.7	14 pts.
10	Evi Sachenbacher-Stehle	GER	+1:32.8	13 pts.
11	Anna Hansson	SWE	+1:39.7	12 pts.
12	Antonella Confortola	ITA	+1:48.6	11 pts.
13	Seraina Mischol	SUI	+1:52.3	10 pts.
14	Yevgeniya Medvedeva	RUS	+1:53.7	9 pts.
15	Sabina Valbusa	ITA	+1:57.5	8 pts.

Tour de Ski standings

#	Name	Nation	Time
1	Charlotte Kalla	SWE	2:43:01.0
2	Virpi Kuitunen	FIN	+36.4
3	Arianna Follis	ITA	+53.3
4	Valentyna Shevchenko	UKR	+1:09.2
5	Olga Rocheva	RUS	+1:14.8

Sprint standings

#	Name	Nation	Points
1	Virpi Kuitunen	FIN	156
2	Arianna Follis	ITA	109
3	Pirjo Muranen	FIN	106
4	Justyna Kowalczyk	POL	99
5	Natalya Korostelyova	RUS	90

== Men ==
=== Final standings ===
==== Overall standings ====
Men's overall standings (1–20)
Rank	Name	Time
1	Lukáš Bauer (CZE)	3:38:07.4
2	René Sommerfeldt (GER)	+2:47.3
3	Giorgio Di Centa (ITA)	+2:47.6
4	Tord Asle Gjerdalen (NOR)	+2:53.9
5	Tor Arne Hetland (NOR)	+3:04.0
6	Franz Göring (GER)	+3:39.9
7	Pietro Piller Cottrer (ITA)	+3:47.5
8	Petter Northug (NOR)	+3:52.9
9	Eugeni Dementiev (RUS)	+3:53.3
10	Jens Arne Svartedal (NOR)	+4:01.3
11	Martin Jakš (CZE)	+4:17.6
12	Martin Koukal (CZE)	+4:24.2
13	Axel Teichmann (GER)	+4:36.5
14	Tobias Angerer (GER)	+4:37.3
15	Valerio Checchi (ITA)	+4:54.8
16	Anders Södergren (SWE)	+5:03.2
17	Christian Hoffmann (AUT)	+5:17.3
18	Nikolay Pankratov (RUS)	+5:19.1
19	Ville Nousiainen (FIN)	+5:19.9
20	Alexander Legkov (RUS)	+5:27.0

==== Sprint Standings ====
Men's sprint standings (1–10)
Rank	Name	Bonus
1	Petter Northug (NOR)	104s
2	Tor Arne Hetland (NOR)	104s
3	Giorgio Di Centa (ITA)	96s
4	Nikolay Morilov (RUS)	90s
5	Tord Asle Gjerdalen (NOR)	88s
6	Lukáš Bauer (CZE)	85s
7	Maxim Vylegzhanin (RUS)	76s
8	John Kristian Dahl (NOR)	66s
9	Nikolay Chebotko (KAZ)	61s
10	Andrey Parfenov (RUS)	59s

=== Stages ===
==== Stage 1 ====
Prologue - December 28; 4.5 km classical, individual start; Nové Město, Czech Republic

Stage result

#	Name	Nation	Time	WC Points
1	Lukáš Bauer	CZE	11:15.6	50 pts.
2	Axel Teichmann	GER	+ 1.0	40 pts.
3	Odd-Bjørn Hjelmeset	NOR	+ 3.3	30 pts.
4	Sami Jauhojärvi	FIN	+ 3.5	25 pts.
5	Mats Larsson	SWE	+ 4.9	23 pts.
6	Jens Arne Svartedal	NOR	+ 5.6	20 pts.
7	Dmitry Liashenko	RUS	+ 8.5	18 pts.
8	Anders Södergren	SWE	+ 10.6	16 pts.
9	John Kristian Dahl	NOR	+ 12.8	14 pts.
9	Tor Arne Hetland	NOR	+ 12.8	14 pts.
11	Eldar Rønning	NOR	+ 14.1	12 pts.
12	Ville Nousiainen	FIN	+ 14.4	11 pts.
13	Maxim Vylegzhanin	RUS	+ 14.7	10 pts.
14	Martin Jakš	CZE	+ 15.5	9 pts.
15	Franz Göring	GER	+ 15.6	8 pts.

Tour de Ski standings

#	Name	Nation	Time
1	Lukáš Bauer	CZE	11:00.6
2	Axel Teichmann	GER	+ 6.0
3	Odd-Bjørn Hjelmeset	NOR	+ 13.3
4	Sami Jauhojärvi	FIN	+ 18.5
5	Mats Larsson	SWE	+ 19.9

Sprint standings

#	Name	Nation	Points
1	Lukáš Bauer	CZE	15
2	Axel Teichmann	GER	10
3	Odd-Bjørn Hjelmeset	NOR	5

==== Stage 2 ====
December 29; 15 km free technique, pursuit; Nové Město, Czech Republic

Stage result

#	Name	Nation	Time	WC Points
1	Emmanuel Jonnier	FRA	34:43.9	50 pts.
2	Lukáš Bauer	CZE	+ 9.6	40 pts.
3	Valerio Checchi	ITA	+ 11.2	30 pts.
4	Tord Asle Gjerdalen	NOR	+ 11.6	25 pts.
5	Pietro Piller Cottrer	ITA	+ 16.2	23 pts.
6	Martin Bajčičák	SVK	+ 17.6	20 pts.
6	Fabio Santus	ITA	+ 17.6	20 pts.
8	Jean Marc Gaillard	FRA	+ 18.5	16 pts.
9	Simen Østensen	NOR	+ 20.3	14 pts.
10	Tobias Angerer	GER	+ 20.4	13 pts.
11	Petter Northug	NOR	+ 20.6	12 pts.
12	René Sommerfeldt	GER	+ 21.2	11 pts.
13	Martin Koukal	CZE	+ 21.4	10 pts.
14	Marcus Hellner	SWE	+ 21.5	9 pts.
15	Yevgeny Dementyev	RUS	+ 22.7	8 pts.

Tour de Ski standings

#	Name	Nation	Time
1	Lukáš Bauer	CZE	45:54.1
2	Marcus Hellner	SWE	+ 47.0
3	Anders Södergren	SWE	+ 47.9
4	Maxim Vylegzhanin	RUS	+ 48.0
5	Simen Østensen	NOR	+ 48.9

Sprint standings

#	Name	Nation	Points
1	Lukáš Bauer	CZE	15
2	Axel Teichmann	GER	10
3	Odd-Bjørn Hjelmeset	NOR	5

==== Stage 3 ====
December 30; 1.2 km free technique, sprint; Prague, Czech Republic

Stage result

#	Name	Nation	Time	WC Points
1	Nikolay Morilov	RUS		50 pts.
2	Simen Østensen	NOR		40 pts.
3	Tor Arne Hetland	NOR		30 pts.
4	Andrey Parfenov	RUS		25 pts.
5	Petter Northug	NOR		23 pts.
6	Maxim Vylegzhanin	RUS		20 pts.
B Final
7	Timo Simonlatser	EST		
8	Dušan Kožíšek	CZE		
9	Tord Asle Gjerdalen	NOR		14 pts.
10	Giorgio Di Centa	ITA		13 pts.
11	Sami Jauhojärvi	FIN		12 pts.
12	Renato Pasini	ITA		11 pts.
Eliminated in the Quarter-final
13	Damien Ambrosetti	FRA	-	
14	Dario Cologna	SUI	-	9 pts.
15	Freddy Schwienbacher	ITA	-	8 pts.

Tour de Ski standings

#	Name	Nation	Time
1	Simen Østensen	NOR	47:27.2
2	Lukáš Bauer	CZE	+12.1
3	Tor Arne Hetland	NOR	+14.9
4	Maxim Vylegzhanin	RUS	+15.2
5	Petter Northug	NOR	+17.1

Sprint standings

#	Name	Nation	Points
1	Nikolay Morilov	RUS	60
2	Simen Østensen	NOR	56
3	Tor Arne Hetland	NOR	52
4	Andrey Parfenov	RUS	49
5	Petter Northug	NOR	44

==== Stage 4 ====
January 1; 15 km free technique, pursuit; Nové Město, Czech Republic

Stage result

#	Name	Nation	Time	WC Points
1	Pietro Piller Cottrer	ITA	35:30.4	50 pts.
2	Valerio Checchi	ITA	+ 4.5	40 pts.
3	Emmanuel Jonnier	FRA	+ 15.3	30 pts.
4	Martin Koukal	CZE	+ 18.2	25 pts.
5	Fabio Santus	ITA	+ 30.7	23 pts.
6	Martin Jakš	CZE	+ 35.0	20 pts.
7	Axel Teichmann	GER	+ 35.3	18 pts.
8	Franz Göring	GER	+ 35.6	16 pts.
9	Giorgio Di Centa	ITA	+ 39.4	14 pts.
10	René Sommerfeldt	GER	+ 42.5	13 pts.
11	Tord Asle Gjerdalen	NOR	+ 46.5	12 pts.
12	Christian Hoffmann	AUT	+ 50.6	11 pts.
13	Lukáš Bauer	CZE	+ 52.4	10 pts.
14	Ilia Chernousov	RUS	+ 52.5	9 pts.
15	Alexander Legkov	RUS	+ 52.7	8 pts.

Tour de Ski standings

#	Name	Nation	Time
1	Lukáš Bauer	CZE	1:24:02.1
2	Martin Koukal	CZE	+ 3.2
3	Pietro Piller Cottrer	ITA	+ 3.4
4	Valerio Checchi	ITA	+ 4.6
5	Tord Asle Gjerdalen	NOR	+ 6.9

Sprint standings

#	Name	Nation	Points
1	Nikolay Morilov	RUS	60
2	Simen Østensen	NOR	56
3	Tor Arne Hetland	NOR	52
4	Andrey Parfenov	RUS	49
5	Petter Northug	NOR	44

==== Stage 5 ====
January 2; 15 km classical, individual start; Nové Město, Czech Republic

Stage result

#	Name	Nation	Time	WC Points
1	Lukáš Bauer	CZE	38:26.9	50 pts.
2	Jens Arne Svartedal	NOR	+ 27.8	40 pts.
3	Nikolay Pankratov	RUS	+ 28.5	30 pts.
4	Mats Larsson	SWE	+ 40.0	25 pts.
5	Eldar Rønning	NOR	+ 49.9	23 pts.
6	Yevgeny Dementyev	RUS	+ 55.9	20 pts.
7	Maxim Vylegzhanin	RUS	+ 56.1	18 pts.
8	Odd-Bjørn Hjelmeset	NOR	+ 1:15.7	16 pts.
9	Jaak Mae	EST	+ 1:19.9	14 pts.
10	Ilia Chernousov	RUS	+ 1:20.8	13 pts.
11	Alexey Poltaranin	KAZ	+ 1:24.1	12 pts.
12	Alexander Legkov	RUS	+ 1:26.2	11 pts.
13	Stanislav Volzhentsev	RUS	+ 1:29.9	10 pts.
14	Anders Södergren	SWE	+ 1:30.2	9 pts.
15	Dmitry Liashenko	RUS	+ 1:31.7	8 pts.

Tour de Ski standings

#	Name	Nation	Time
1	Lukáš Bauer	CZE	2:02:04.0
2	Tord Asle Gjerdalen	NOR	+ 2:07.3
3	Pietro Piller Cottrer	ITA	+ 2:32.8
4	René Sommerfeldt	GER	+ 2:39.3
5	Emmanuel Jonnier	FRA	+ 2:41.7

Sprint standings

#	Name	Nation	Points
1	Nikolay Morilov	RUS	60
2	Simen Østensen	NOR	56
3	Andrey Parfenov	RUS	54
4	Tor Arne Hetland	NOR	52
5	Petter Northug	NOR	44
6	Maxim Vylegzhanin	RUS	42

==== Stage 6 ====
January 4; 1.2 km free technique, sprint; Asiago, Italy

Stage result

#	Name	Nation	Time	WC Points
1	Petter Northug	NOR	2:33.8	50 pts.
2	Nikolay Chebotko	KAZ	+ 0.2	40 pts.
3	Tor Arne Hetland	NOR	+ 0.2	30 pts.
4	Cristian Zorzi	ITA	+ 0.3	25 pts.
5	Pietro Piller Cottrer	ITA	+ 0.3	23 pts.
6	Tord Asle Gjerdalen	NOR	+ 4.7	20 pts.
B Final
7	Martin Koukal	CZE	2:33.9	18 pts.
8	Marcus Hellner	SWE	+ 1.1	16 pts.
9	John Kristian Dahl	NOR	+ 1.9	14 pts.
10	Maxim Vylegzhanin	RUS	+ 2.3	13 pts.
11	Giorgio Di Centa	ITA	+ 2.5	12 pts.
12	Nikolay Morilov	RUS	+ 7.9	11 pts.
Eliminated in the Quarter-final
13	Eldar Rønning	NOR	-	10 pts.
14	Ville Nousiainen	FIN	-	9 pts.
15	Jens Arne Svartedal	NOR	-	8 pts.

Tour de Ski standings

#	Name	Nation	Time
1	Lukáš Bauer	CZE	2:04:42.0
2	Tord Asle Gjerdalen	NOR	+ 1:17.1
3	Pietro Piller Cottrer	ITA	+ 1:45.2
4	Tor Arne Hetland	NOR	+ 2:00.4
5	Petter Northug	NOR	+ 2:03.9

Sprint standings

#	Name	Nation	Points
1	Petter Northug	NOR	104
1	Tor Arne Hetland	NOR	104
3	Nikolay Morilov	RUS	90
4	Tord Asle Gjerdalen	NOR	78
5	Maxim Vylegzhanin	RUS	76
6	John Kristian Dahl	NOR	66
6	Giorgio Di Centa	ITA	66

==== Stage 7 ====
January 5; 20 km classical, mass start; Val di Fiemme, Italy

Stage result

#	Name	Nation	Time	WC Points
1	Odd-Bjørn Hjelmeset	NOR	1:00:17.8	50 pts.
2	Jens Arne Svartedal	NOR	1:00:17.8	40 pts.
3	Franz Göring	GER	+ 3.2	30 pts.
4	Tord Asle Gjerdalen	NOR	+ 5.2	25 pts.
5	Axel Teichmann	GER	+ 5.5	23 pts.
6	Yevgeny Dementyev	RUS	+ 6.2	20 pts.
7	Lukáš Bauer	CZE	+ 7.5	18 pts.
8	Valerio Checchi	ITA	+ 9.0	16 pts.
9	Tobias Angerer	GER	+ 10.2	14 pts.
10	Tor Arne Hetland	NOR	+ 10.2	13 pts.
11	Pietro Piller Cottrer	ITA	+ 11.0	12 pts.
12	Ville Nousiainen	FIN	+ 12.8	11 pts.
13	Petter Northug	NOR	+ 20.4	10 pts.
14	John Kristian Dahl	NOR	+ 21.1	9 pts.
15	Eldar Rønning	NOR	+ 21.9	8 pts.

Tour de Ski standings

#	Name	Nation	Time
1	Lukáš Bauer	CZE	3:04:22.3
2	Tord Asle Gjerdalen	NOR	+ 1:49.8
3	Pietro Piller Cottrer	ITA	+ 2:23.7
4	Jens Arne Svartedal	NOR	+ 2:41.2
5	Tor Arne Hetland	NOR	+ 2:48.1
6	Giorgio Di Centa	ITA	+ 2:58.3
7	Petter Northug	NOR	+ 3:01.8

Sprint standings

#	Name	Nation	Points
1	Petter Northug	NOR	104
1	Tor Arne Hetland	NOR	104
3	Giorgio Di Centa	ITA	96
4	Nikolay Morilov	RUS	90
5	Tord Asle Gjerdalen	NOR	88

==== Stage 8 ====
Final Climb - January 6; 10 km free technique, pursuit; Val di Fiemme, Italy

Stage result

#	Name	Nation	Time	WC Points
1	René Sommerfeldt	GER	32:59.0	50 pts.
2	Christian Hoffmann	AUT	+19.3	40 pts.
3	Martin Bajčičák	SVK	+19.8	30 pts.
4	Giorgio Di Centa	ITA	+35.4	25 pts.
5	Franz Göring	GER	+39.5	23 pts.
6	Anders Södergren	SWE	+40.3	20 pts.
7	Lukáš Bauer	CZE	+46.1	18 pts.
8	Nikolay Pankratov	RUS	+50.4	16 pts.
9	Tor Arne Hetland	NOR	+1:02.0	14 pts.
10	Tobias Angerer	GER	+1:04.1	13 pts.
11	Valerio Checchi	ITA	+1:06.7	12 pts.
12	Martin Jakš	CZE	+1:09.6	11 pts.
13	Fabio Santus	ITA	+1:14.0	10 pts.
14	Marcus Hellner	SWE	+1:16.3	9 pts.
15	Emmanuel Jonnier	FRA	+1:16.4	8 pts.

Tour de Ski standings

#	Name	Nation	Time
1	Lukáš Bauer	CZE	3:38:07.4
2	René Sommerfeldt	GER	+2:47.3
3	Giorgio Di Centa	ITA	+2:47.6
4	Tord Asle Gjerdalen	NOR	+2:53.9
5	Tor Arne Hetland	NOR	+3:04.0

Sprint standings

#	Name	Nation	Points
1	Petter Northug	NOR	104
2	Tor Arne Hetland	NOR	104
3	Giorgio Di Centa	ITA	96
4	Nikolay Morilov	RUS	90
5	Tord Asle Gjerdalen	NOR	88
