= Lukas Bauer =

Lukas Bauer may refer to:

- Lukáš Bauer (born 1977), Czech cross country skier
- Lukas Bauer (volleyball) (born 1989), German volleyball player in the Germany men's national volleyball team
