= Tyldum =

Tyldum is a Norwegian surname. Notable people with the surname include:

- Ingri Aunet Tyldum (born 1983), Norwegian cross-country skier
- Jon Åge Tyldum (born 1968), Norwegian biathlete
- Morten Tyldum (born 1967), Norwegian film director
- Pål Tyldum (born 1942), Norwegian cross-country skier
