= Morten Eilifsen =

Norwegian cross-country skier

Personal information
- Nationality: Norway
- Born: January 6, 1984 (age 42)

Sport
- Sport: Skiing
- Club: Henning SL

World Cup career
- Seasons: 6 – (2006, 2008–2012)
- Indiv. starts: 20
- Indiv. podiums: 0
- Team starts: 5
- Team podiums: 3
- Team wins: 1
- Overall titles: 0 – (72nd in 2008)
- Discipline titles: 0

Morten Eilifsen (born January 6, 1984) is a Norwegian cross-country skier who competed between 2004 and 2014. His best World Cup finish was ninth in a 15 km event in Norway in 2007. Eilifsen's lone win was in the 4 × 10 km relay in Sweden in 2008. He was never selected to compete in the Olympic Games or the FIS Nordic World Ski Championships.

== Cross-country skiing results ==
All results are sourced from the International Ski Federation (FIS).

=== World Cup ===
==== Season standings ====
Season	Age	Discipline standings			Ski Tour standings		
Season	Age	Overall	Distance	Sprint	Nordic Opening	Tour de Ski	World Cup Final
2006	22	NC	NC	—	—N/a	—N/a	—N/a
2008	24	72	46	—	—N/a	—	—
2009	25	179	113	—	—N/a	—	—
2010	26	106	66	NC	—N/a	—	—
2011	27	123	75	—	—	—	—
2012	28	NC	NC	—	—	—	—

==== Team podiums ====
- 1 victory – (1 RL)
- 3 podiums – (3 RL)

No.	Season	Date	Location	Race	Level	Place	Teammates
1	2007–08	25 November 2007	Beitostølen, Norway	4 × 10 km Relay C/F	World Cup	2nd	Rønning / Hjelmeset / Gjerdalen
2	2007–08	24 February 2008	Falun, Sweden	4 × 10 km Relay C/F	World Cup	1st	Sundby / Jespersen / Northug
3	2011–12	20 November 2011	Sjusjøen, Norway	4 × 10 km Relay C/F	World Cup	2nd	Dahl / Ansnes / Røthe
