= 2007–08 FIS Cross-Country World Cup =

Cross-country skiing competition

Discipline	Men	Women
Overall	(Czech Republic) Lukáš Bauer	(Finland) Virpi Kuitunen (2nd title)
Distance	(Czech Republic) Lukáš Bauer	(Finland) Virpi Kuitunen
Sprint	(Norway) Ola Vigen Hattestad	(Slovenia) Petra Majdič
Nations Cup	Norway	Norway
- Nations Cup Overall: Norway

Stage events
Tour de Ski	(Czech Republic) Lukáš Bauer	(Sweden) Charlotte Kalla
World Cup Final	(France) Vincent Vittoz	(Finland) Virpi Kuitunen

Competition
Locations	18 venues	18 venues
Individual	31 events	31 events
Relay/Team	5 events	5 events

The 2007–08 FIS Cross-Country World Cup was a multi-race tournament over the season for cross-country skiers. It was the 27th official World Cup season in cross-country skiing for men and women. The season began on 27 October 2007 with 800m sprint races for women in Düsseldorf, won by Natalia Matveeva of Russia, who took her first World Cup victory. The season concluded with World Cup Finals, a mini-tour held in Bormio, Italy. Finnish skier Virpi Kuitunen won the overall women's cup for the 2nd consecutive season and Lukáš Bauer of Czech Republic won the overall men's cup. The World Cup is organised by the FIS who also run world cups and championships in ski jumping, snowboarding and alpine skiing amongst others.

== Calendar ==
Both men's and women's events tend to be held at the same resorts over a 2 or 3 day period. Listed below is a list of races which equates with the points table further down this page.

The Tour de Ski is a series of events which count towards the World Cup. This starts with the meet at Nové Město and concludes at Val di Fiemme.

=== Men ===
Key: C – Classic / F – Freestyle
WC	Date	Place	Discipline	Winner	Second	Third	Yellow bib	Ref.
1	27 October 2007	(Germany) Düsseldorf	Sprint F	Josef Wenzl (GER)	Björn Lind (SWE)	John Kristian Dahl (NOR)	Josef Wenzl (GER)	
2	24 November 2007	(Norway) Beitostølen	15 km F	Axel Teichmann (GER)	Lukáš Bauer (CZE)	Anders Södergren (SWE)	(Germany) Teichmann/Wenzl	
3	1 December 2007	(Finland) Ruka	Sprint C	Johan Kjølstad (NOR)	Emil Jönsson (SWE)	Mats Larsson (SWE)	Johan Kjølstad (NOR)	
4	2 December 2007	(Finland) Ruka	15 km C	Lukáš Bauer (CZE)	Eldar Rønning (NOR)	Axel Teichmann (GER)	Lukáš Bauer (CZE)	
5	8 December 2007	(Switzerland) Davos	15 km C	Axel Teichmann (GER)	Odd-Bjørn Hjelmeset (NOR)	Sami Jauhojärvi (FIN)	Axel Teichmann (GER)	
6	15 December 2007	(Russia) Rybinsk	30 km F Mass Start	Tor Arne Hetland (NOR)	Ville Nousiainen (FIN)	Pietro Piller Cottrer (ITA)	Axel Teichmann (GER)	
7	16 December 2007	(Russia) Rybinsk	Sprint F	Anders Gløersen (NOR)	Ola Vigen Hattestad (NOR)	Øystein Pettersen (NOR)	Axel Teichmann (GER)	
8	28 December 2007	(Czech Republic) Nové Město	4.5 km C Prologue	Lukáš Bauer (CZE)	Axel Teichmann (GER)	Odd-Bjørn Hjelmeset (NOR)	Axel Teichmann (GER)	
9	29 December 2007	(Czech Republic) Nové Město	15 km F Pursuit	Emmanuel Jonnier (FRA)	Lukáš Bauer (CZE)	Valerio Checchi (ITA)	Lukáš Bauer (CZE)	
10	30 December 2007	(Czech Republic) Prague	Sprint F	Nikolay Morilov (RUS)	Simen Østensen (NOR)	Tor Arne Hetland (NOR)	Lukáš Bauer (CZE)	
11	1 January 2008	(Czech Republic) Nové Město (Note: Rescheduled from Oberstdorf.)	15 km F Pursuit	Pietro Piller Cottrer (ITA)	Valerio Checchi (ITA)	Emmanuel Jonnier (FRA)	Lukáš Bauer (CZE)	
12	2 January 2008	(Czech Republic) Nové Město	15 km C	Lukáš Bauer (CZE)	Jens Arne Svartedal (NOR)	Nikolay Pankratov (RUS)	Lukáš Bauer (CZE)	
13	4 January 2008	(Italy) Asiago	Sprint F	Petter Northug (NOR)	Nikolay Chebotko (KAZ)	Tor Arne Hetland (NOR)	Lukáš Bauer (CZE)	
14	5 January 2008	(Italy) Val di Fiemme	20 km C Mass Start	Odd-Bjørn Hjelmeset (NOR)	Jens Arne Svartedal (NOR)	Franz Göring (GER)	Lukáš Bauer (CZE)	
15	6 January 2008	(Italy) Val di Fiemme	10 km F Final Climb	René Sommerfeldt (GER)	Christian Hoffmann (AUT)	Martin Bajčičák (SVK)	Lukáš Bauer (CZE)	
2nd Tour de Ski Overall (28 December 2007 – 6 January 2008)				Lukáš Bauer (CZE)	René Sommerfeldt (GER)	Giorgio Di Centa (ITA)	Lukáš Bauer (CZE)	
16	22 January 2008	(Canada) Canmore	15 km C + 15 km F Double Pursuit	Nikolay Pankratov (RUS)	Giorgio Di Centa (ITA)	Axel Teichmann (GER)	Lukáš Bauer (CZE)	
17	23 January 2008	(Canada) Canmore	Sprint C	Børre Næss (NOR)	Ola Vigen Hattestad (NOR)	Eldar Rønning (NOR)	Lukáš Bauer (CZE)	
18	25 January 2008	(Canada) Canmore	15 km F	Valerio Checchi (ITA)	René Sommerfeldt (GER)	Pietro Piller Cottrer (ITA)	Lukáš Bauer (CZE)	
19	26 January 2008	(Canada) Canmore	Sprint F	Emil Jönsson (SWE)	Ivan Ivanov (RUS)	Mattias Strandvall (FIN)	Lukáš Bauer (CZE)	
20	9 February 2008	(Estonia) Otepää	15 km C	Lukáš Bauer (CZE)	Jaak Mae (EST)	Ville Nousiainen (FIN)	Lukáš Bauer (CZE)	
21	10 February 2008	(Estonia) Otepää	Sprint C	Eldar Rønning (NOR)	John Kristian Dahl (NOR)	Ola Vigen Hattestad (NOR)	Lukáš Bauer (CZE)	
22	16 February 2008	(Czech Republic) Liberec	11.4 km F	Jean Marc Gaillard (FRA)	Lukáš Bauer (CZE)	Christian Hoffmann (AUT)	Lukáš Bauer (CZE)	
23	23 February 2008	(Sweden) Falun	15 km C + 15 km F Double Pursuit	Lukáš Bauer (CZE)	Tord Asle Gjerdalen (NOR)	Anders Södergren (SWE)	Lukáš Bauer (CZE)	
24	27 February 2008	(Sweden) Stockholm	Sprint C	Jens Arne Svartedal (NOR)	Børre Næss (NOR)	Emil Jönsson (SWE)	Lukáš Bauer (CZE)	
25	1 March 2008	(Finland) Lahti	Sprint F	Anders Gløersen (NOR)	Andrew Newell (USA)	Ola Vigen Hattestad (NOR)	Lukáš Bauer (CZE)	
26	2 March 2008	(Finland) Lahti	15 km C	Lukáš Bauer (CZE)	René Sommerfeldt (GER)	Sergey Cherepanov (KAZ)	Lukáš Bauer (CZE)	
27	5 March 2008	(Norway) Drammen	Sprint C	Ola Vigen Hattestad (NOR)	Jens Arne Svartedal (NOR)	Emil Jönsson (SWE)	Lukáš Bauer (CZE)	
28	8 March 2008	(Norway) Oslo	50 km F	Anders Södergren (SWE)	Lukáš Bauer (CZE)	Remo Fischer (SUI)	Lukáš Bauer (CZE)	
29	14 March 2008	(Italy) Bormio	3.3 km F Prologue	Pietro Piller Cottrer (ITA)	Tord Asle Gjerdalen (NOR)	Martin Jakš (CZE)	Lukáš Bauer (CZE)	
30	15 March 2008	(Italy) Bormio	20 km C Mass Start (Note: No World Cup points were awarded in this race, thus neither podium positions or other placing in the race count in the World Cup statistics.)	Vincent Vittoz (FRA)	Lukáš Bauer (CZE)	Tord Asle Gjerdalen (NOR)	Lukáš Bauer (CZE)	
31	16 March 2008	(Italy) Bormio	15 km F Pursuit; World Cup Final Overall	Vincent Vittoz (FRA)	Lukáš Bauer (CZE)	Giorgio Di Centa (ITA)	Lukáš Bauer (CZE)	

=== Women ===
Key: C – Classic / F – Freestyle
WC	Date	Place	Discipline	Winner	Second	Third	Yellow bib	Ref.
1	27 October 2007	(Germany) Düsseldorf	Sprint F	(Russia) Natalya Matveyeva	(Norway) Marit Bjørgen	(Sweden) Anna Dahlberg	(Russia) Natalya Matveyeva	
2	24 November 2007	(Norway) Beitostølen	10 km F	(Norway) Marit Bjørgen	(Norway) Vibeke Skofterud	(Sweden) Charlotte Kalla	(Norway) Marit Bjørgen	
3	1 December 2007	(Finland) Ruka	Sprint C	(Slovenia) Petra Majdič	(Norway) Astrid Uhrenholdt Jacobsen	(Slovakia) Alena Procházková	(Norway) Marit Bjørgen	
4	2 December 2007	(Finland) Ruka	10 km C	(Norway) Marit Bjørgen	(Norway) Astrid Uhrenholdt Jacobsen	(Poland) Justyna Kowalczyk	(Norway) Marit Bjørgen	
5	8 December 2007	(Switzerland) Davos	10 km C	(Finland) Virpi Kuitunen	(Norway) Vibeke Skofterud	(Norway) Kristin Størmer Steira	(Norway) Marit Bjørgen	
6	15 December 2007	(Russia) Rybinsk	15 km F Mass Start	(Norway) Astrid Uhrenholdt Jacobsen	(Russia) Natalya Korostelyova	(Finland) Riitta-Liisa Roponen	(Norway) Marit Bjørgen	
7	16 December 2007	(Russia) Rybinsk	Sprint F	(United States) Kikkan Randall	(Norway) Astrid Uhrenholdt Jacobsen	(Russia) Natalya Korostelyova	(Norway) Astrid Uhrenholdt Jacobsen	
8	28 December 2007	(Czech Republic) Nové Město	3.3 km C Prologue	(Finland) Virpi Kuitunen	(Finland) Aino-Kaisa Saarinen	(Poland) Justyna Kowalczyk	(Norway) Astrid Uhrenholdt Jacobsen	
9	29 December 2007	(Czech Republic) Nové Město	10 km F Pursuit	(Sweden) Charlotte Kalla	(Italy) Sabina Valbusa	(Norway) Marit Bjørgen	(Norway) Astrid Uhrenholdt Jacobsen	
10	30 December 2007	(Czech Republic) Prague	Sprint F	(Italy) Arianna Follis	(Finland) Pirjo Muranen	(Norway) Marit Bjørgen	(Norway) Astrid Uhrenholdt Jacobsen	
11	1 January 2008	(Czech Republic) Nové Město	10 km F Pursuit	(Sweden) Charlotte Kalla	(Norway) Kristin Størmer Steira	(Germany) Claudia Künzel-Nystad	(Norway) Astrid Uhrenholdt Jacobsen	
12	2 January 2008	(Czech Republic) Nové Město	10 km C	(Finland) Aino-Kaisa Saarinen	(Finland) Virpi Kuitunen	(Norway) Therese Johaug	(Norway) Astrid Uhrenholdt Jacobsen	
13	4 January 2008	(Italy) Asiago	Sprint F	(Sweden) Charlotte Kalla	(Russia) Natalya Korostelyova	(Poland) Justyna Kowalczyk	(Norway) Astrid Uhrenholdt Jacobsen	
14	5 January 2008	(Italy) Val di Fiemme	10 km C Mass Start	(Finland) Virpi Kuitunen	(Sweden) Charlotte Kalla	(Germany) Claudia Künzel-Nystad	(Norway) Astrid Uhrenholdt Jacobsen	
15	6 January 2008	(Italy) Val di Fiemme	9 km F Final Climb	(Ukraine) Valentyna Shevchenko	(Norway) Kristin Størmer Steira	(Germany) Claudia Künzel-Nystad	(Norway) Astrid Uhrenholdt Jacobsen	
2nd Tour de Ski Overall (28 December 2007 – 6 January 2008)				(Sweden) Charlotte Kalla	(Finland) Virpi Kuitunen	(Italy) Arianna Follis	(Sweden) Charlotte Kalla	
16	22 January 2008	(Canada) Canmore	7.5 km C + 7.5 km F Double Pursuit	(Poland) Justyna Kowalczyk	(Russia) Yevgeniya Medvedeva	(Russia) Olga Rocheva	(Sweden) Charlotte Kalla	
17	23 January 2008	(Canada) Canmore	Sprint C	(Slovenia) Petra Majdič	(Norway) Astrid Uhrenholdt Jacobsen	(Poland) Justyna Kowalczyk	(Sweden) Charlotte Kalla	
18	25 January 2008	(Canada) Canmore	10 km F	(Ukraine) Valentyna Shevchenko	(Russia) Yevgeniya Medvedeva	(Poland) Justyna Kowalczyk	(Sweden) Charlotte Kalla	
19	26 January 2008	(Canada) Canmore	Sprint F	(Canada) Chandra Crawford	(Finland) Pirjo Muranen	(Italy) Magda Genuin	(Finland) Virpi Kuitunen	
20	9 February 2008	(Estonia) Otepää	10 km C	(Finland) Virpi Kuitunen	(Finland) Aino-Kaisa Saarinen	(Norway) Therese Johaug	(Finland) Virpi Kuitunen	
21	10 February 2008	(Estonia) Otepää	Sprint C	(Slovenia) Petra Majdič	(Norway) Astrid Uhrenholdt Jacobsen	(Finland) Virpi Kuitunen	(Finland) Virpi Kuitunen	
22	16 February 2008	(Czech Republic) Liberec	7.6 km F	(Norway) Astrid Uhrenholdt Jacobsen	(Poland) Justyna Kowalczyk	(Sweden) Charlotte Kalla	(Finland) Virpi Kuitunen	
23	23 February 2008	(Sweden) Falun	7.5 km C + 7.5 km F Double Pursuit	(Norway) Astrid Uhrenholdt Jacobsen	(Norway) Marit Bjørgen	(Finland) Aino-Kaisa Saarinen	(Finland) Virpi Kuitunen	
24	27 February 2008	(Sweden) Stockholm	Sprint C	(Finland) Virpi Kuitunen	(Slovenia) Petra Majdič	(Japan) Madoka Natsumi	(Finland) Virpi Kuitunen	
25	1 March 2008	(Finland) Lahti	Sprint F	(Canada) Chandra Crawford	(Russia) Natalya Matveyeva	(Germany) Evi Sachenbacher-Stehle	(Finland) Virpi Kuitunen	
26	2 March 2008	(Finland) Lahti	10 km C	(Finland) Virpi Kuitunen	(Ukraine) Valentyna Shevchenko	(Germany) Katrin Zeller	(Finland) Virpi Kuitunen	
27	5 March 2008	(Norway) Drammen	Sprint C	(Finland) Virpi Kuitunen	(Slovenia) Petra Majdič	(Norway) Astrid Uhrenholdt Jacobsen	(Finland) Virpi Kuitunen	
28	8 March 2008	(Norway) Oslo	30 km F	(Ukraine) Valentyna Shevchenko	(Sweden) Charlotte Kalla	(Germany) Claudia Künzel-Nystad	(Finland) Virpi Kuitunen	
29	14 March 2008	(Italy) Bormio	2.5 km F Prologue	(Germany) Claudia Künzel-Nystad	(Norway) Astrid Uhrenholdt Jacobsen	(Finland) Riitta-Liisa Roponen	(Finland) Virpi Kuitunen	
30	15 March 2008	(Italy) Bormio	10 km C Mass Start	(Finland) Virpi Kuitunen	(Poland) Justyna Kowalczyk	(Norway) Marit Bjørgen	(Finland) Virpi Kuitunen	
31	16 March 2008	(Italy) Bormio	10 km F Pursuit; World Cup Final Overall	(Finland) Virpi Kuitunen	(Poland) Justyna Kowalczyk	(Germany) Claudia Künzel-Nystad	(Finland) Virpi Kuitunen	

=== Men's team ===
WC	Date	Place	Discipline	Winner	Second	Third	Ref.
1	28 October 2007	(Germany) Düsseldorf	Team Sprint F	Sweden I Thobias Fredriksson; Peter Larsson	Norway II Johan Kjølstad; Tor Arne Hetland	Sweden II Marcus Hellner; Emil Jönsson	
2	25 November 2007	(Norway) Beitostølen	4 × 10 km relay C/F	Norway II Martin Johnsrud Sundby; Jens Arne Svartedal; Tore Ruud Hofstad; Tor Arne Hetland	Norway I Eldar Rønning; Odd-Bjørn Hjelmeset; Morten Eilifsen; Tord Asle Gjerdalen	Russia I Vasily Rochev; Nikolay Pankratov; Alexander Legkov; Yevgeny Dementyev	
3	9 December 2007	(Switzerland) Davos	4 × 10 km relay C/F	Czech Republic Milan Šperl; Martin Jakš; Lukáš Bauer; Martin Koukal	Italy Giorgio Di Centa; Valerio Checchi; Pietro Piller Cottrer; Cristian Zorzi	Sweden Mats Larsson; Johan Olsson; Anders Södergren; Marcus Hellner	
4	17 February 2008	(Czech Republic) Liberec	Team Sprint C	Norway II Martin Johnsrud Sundby; Simen Østensen	Finland I Sami Jauhojärvi; Ville Nousiainen	Norway I John Kristian Dahl; Eldar Rønning	
5	24 February 2008	(Sweden) Falun	4 × 10 km relay C/F	Norway II Martin Johnsrud Sundby; Chris Jespersen; Morten Eilifsen; Petter Northug	Norway I Jens Arne Svartedal; Odd-Bjørn Hjelmeset; Simen Østensen; Tord Asle Gjerdalen	Czech Republic Martin Jakš; Lukáš Bauer; Jiří Magál; Martin Koukal	

=== Women's team ===
WC	Date	Place	Discipline	Winner	Second	Third	Ref.
1	28 October 2007	(Germany) Düsseldorf	Team Sprint F	Sweden II Charlotte Kalla; Britta Norgren	Russia I Natalya Matveyeva; Natalya Korostelyova	Finland I Pirjo Muranen; Virpi Kuitunen	
2	25 November 2007	(Norway) Beitostølen	4 × 5 km relay C/F	Norway I Astrid Uhrenholdt Jacobsen; Therese Johaug; Vibeke Skofterud; Marit Bjørgen	Germany I Stefanie Böhler; Katrin Zeller; Evi Sachenbacher-Stehle; Claudia Künzel-Nystad	Finland Riikka Sarasoja; Aino-Kaisa Saarinen; Riitta-Liisa Roponen; Pirjo Muranen	
3	9 December 2007	(Switzerland) Davos	4 × 5 km relay C/F	Norway Kristin Mürer Stemland; Therese Johaug; Kristin Størmer Steira; Vibeke Skofterud	Germany Manuela Henkel; Katrin Zeller; Evi Sachenbacher-Stehle; Stefanie Böhler	Russia I Larisa Kurkina; Olga Rocheva; Yuliya Chekalyova; Natalya Korostelyova	
4	17 February 2008	(Czech Republic) Liberec	Team Sprint C	Norway I Marit Bjørgen; Astrid Uhrenholdt Jacobsen	Finland I Aino-Kaisa Saarinen; Pirjo Muranen	Russia I Yevgeniya Shapovalova; Natalya Matveyeva	
5	24 February 2008	(Sweden) Falun	4 × 5 km relay C/F	Norway I Ingrid Aunet Tyldum; Astrid Uhrenholdt Jacobsen; Kristin Størmer Steira; Marit Bjørgen	Finland Virpi Kuitunen; Aino-Kaisa Saarinen; Riitta-Liisa Roponen; Riikka Sarasoja	Germany Stefanie Böhler; Katrin Zeller; Claudia Künzel-Nystad; Evi Sachenbacher-Stehle	

== World Cup points ==
Place	1	2	3	4	5	6	7	8	9	10	11	12	13	14	15	16	17	18	19	20	21	22	23	24	25	26	27	28	29	30
Individual	100	80	60	50	45	40	36	32	29	26	24	22	20	18	16	15	14	13	12	11	10	9	8	7	6	5	4	3	2	1
Team Sprint	100	80	60	50	45	40	36	32	29	26	24	22	20	18	16	15	14	13	12	11	10	9	8	7	6	5	4	3	2	1
World Cup Final	200	160	120	100	90	80	72	64	58	52	48	44	40	36	32	30	28	26	24	22	20	18	16	14	12	10	8	6	4	2
Relay	200	160	120	100	90	80	72	64	58	52	48	44	40	36	32	30	28	26	24	22	20	18	16	14	12	10	8	6	4	2
Tour de Ski	400	320	240	200	180	160	144	128	116	104	96	88	80	72	64	60	56	52	48	44	40	36	32	28	24	20	16	12	8	4
Stage Tour de Ski	50	40	30	25	23	20	18	16	14	13	12	11	10	9	8

The table shows the number of points won in the 2007–08 Cross-Country Skiing World Cup for men and women.

A skier's best results in 18 distance races and 9 sprint races counts towards the overall World Cup totals.

All distance races, included individual stages in Tour de Ski (which counts as 50% of a normal race) and the total World Cup Final, count towards the distance standings. All sprint races, including the sprint races during the Tour de Ski (which counts as 50% of a normal race) and the first race of the World Cup final, count towards the sprint standings.

The Nations Cup ranking is calculated by adding each country's individual competitors' scores and scores from team events. Relay events count double (see World Cup final positions), with only one team counting towards the total, while in team sprint events two teams contribute towards the total, with the usual World Cup points (100 to winning team, etc.) awarded.

=== Men's standings ===
==== Overall ====
Pos	Athlete	1	2	3	4	5	6	7	8	9	10	11	12	13	14	15	TdS	16	17	18	19	20	21	22	23	24	25	26	27	28	29	WCF	Total
1	Lukáš Bauer (CZE)		80		100	50			50	40		10	50		18	18	400					100		80	100			100		80	26	160	1462
2	René Sommerfeldt (GER)		50		11	14	45			11		13				50	320	13		80		14		22	45			80		2	15	44	829
3	Pietro Piller Cottrer (ITA)		12			8	60			23		50		23	12		144	45		80				50	29			22		45	100	100	783
4	Tord Asle Gjerdalen (NOR)		36		3	7	29			25	14	12		20	25		200	8		24	15				80		10	32			80	72	692
5	Giorgio Di Centa (ITA)		18				20				13	14		12		25	240	80		45					36					24	45	120	692
6	Tor Arne Hetland (NOR)	18	9	~~13~~	4	40	100	50	14		30			30	13	14	180		45		~~12~~		~~4~~		26	13	36	8	26				656
7	Anders Södergren (SWE)		60		14	11			16				9			20	60	36		32		36		45	60					100	40	10	549
8	Axel Teichmann (GER)		100		60	100			40			18			23		80	60	13	7		1	36					5					543
9	Jens Arne Svartedal (NOR)				40	29			20				40	8	40		104					40				100		26	80				527
10	Valerio Checchi (ITA)		4		20	7	50			30		40			16	12	64	40		100		13		26	16			10			22	40	510
11	Vincent Vittoz (FRA)		24			22	24											4		50		26		32	24					50	36	200	492
12	Petter Northug (NOR)	50					9	2		12	23			50	10		128	1		9				29			24	16			32	90	475
13	Eldar Rønning (NOR)	11	5	3	80	45			12				23	10	8		20	2	60				100			50		14	20				463
14	Ola Vigen Hattestad (NOR)			36				80											80		5		60			29	60		100				450
15	Emil Jönsson (SWE)	14		80				40											36		100		50			60	8		60				448
16	Tobias Angerer (GER)	26	32		32	40				13					14	13	72	50				20		1	15			9		26	14	22	399
17	Ville Nousiainen (FIN)				22		80		11					9	11		48			20	2	60		11	11			24			12	52	373
18	Odd Bjørn Hjelmeset (NOR)		3			80			30				16		50		36					45						45	32				337
19	John Kristian Dahl (NOR)	60		32				16	14					14	9								80			40	20		45	3			333
20	Sami Jauhojärvi (FIN)				1	60			25		12													12	13	7	32	50	9		11	90	322
21	Anders Gløersen (NOR)							100											50		4		40			15	100		6				315
22	Franz Göring (GER)		14	12	24	13			8			16			30	23	160						11										311
23	Martin Jakš (CZE)			6	13	5			9			20				11	96					24		20				18	1		60	26	309
24	Nikolay Pankratov (RUS)				26	16	8						30			16	52	100		29											1		278
25	Johan Kjølstad (NOR)	24		100				45											4		13		24			32			36				278
26	Alexander Legkov (RUS)		22		32	15	40					8	11				44	29		16		10			22						24		273
27	Simen Østensen (NOR)				9	32				14	40						12					18		2	40			20	29		18	30	264
28	Björn Lind (SWE)	80		29				22											24		26					26	50		4				261
29	Yevgeny Dementyev (RUS)				18		3			8			20		20		116			10					32					11	11		249
30	Børre Næss (NOR)																		100				14			80			50				244

==== Distance ====
Pos	Athlete	2	4	5	6	9	11	12	14	15	16	18	20	22	23	26	28	WCF	Total
1	Lukáš Bauer (CZE)	80	100	50		40	10	50	18	18			100	80	100	100	80	160	986
2	Pietro Piller Cottrer (ITA)	12		8	60	23	50		12		45	60		50	29	22	45	100	516
3	René Sommerfeldt (GER)	50	11	14	45	11	13			50	13	80	14	22	45	80	2	44	494
4	Vincent Vittoz (FRA)	24		22	24						4	50	26	32	24		50	200	456
5	Anders Södergren (SWE)	60	14	11				9		20	36	32	36	45	60		100	10	433
6	Valerio Checchi (ITA)	4	20	7	50	30	40		16	12	40	100	13	26	16	10		40	424
7	Giorgio Di Centa (ITA)	18			20		14			25	80	45			36		24	120	382
8	Axel Teichmann (GER)	100	60	100			18		23		60	7	1			5			374
9	Tord Asle Gjerdalen (NOR)	36	3	7	29	25	12		25		8	24			80	32		72	353
10	Ville Nousiainen (FIN)		22		80				11			20	60	11	11	24		52	291

==== Sprint ====
Pos	Athlete	1	3	7	8	10	13	17	19	21	24	25	27	29	Total
1	Ola Vigen Hattestad (NOR)		36	80				80	5	60	29	60	100		450
2	Emil Jönsson (SWE)	14	80	40				36	100	50	60	8	60		448
3	John Kristian Dahl (NOR)	60	32	16	14		14			80	40	20	45		321
4	Anders Gløersen (NOR)			100				50	4	40	18	100	6		318
5	Tor Arne Hetland (NOR)	18	13	50	14	30	30	45	12	4	13	36	26		291
6	Johan Kjølstad (NOR)	24	100	45				4	13	24	32		36		278
7	Eldar Rønning (NOR)	11	3		12		10	60		100	50		20		266
8	Björn Lind (SWE)	80	29	22				24	26		26	50	4		261
9	Børre Næss (NOR)							100		14	80		50		244
10	Andrew Newell (USA)	12	50	36				14	14	3		80	10		219

=== Women's standings ===
==== Overall ====
Pos	Athlete	1	2	3	4	5	6	7	8	9	10	11	12	13	14	15	TdS	16	17	18	19	20	21	22	23	24	25	26	27	28	29	WCF	Total
1	Virpi Kuitunen (FIN)	24				100	10	29	50		~~23~~	11	40	~~12~~	50		320	36	50	24	40	100	60		22	100		100	100	36	50	200	1552
2	Astrid Uhrenholdt Jacobsen (NOR)		40	80	80		100	80		9	~~12~~	13	13	20			60	15	80	40	26	22	80	100	100	45	~~7~~	40	60		80	72	1255
3	Justyna Kowalczyk (POL)		36	36	60	24			30	8	20	14	16	30			144	100	60	60	~~10~~	45	36	80	32		29	26	32		18	160	1096
4	Charlotte Kalla (SWE)	16	60	22	29	26			18	50		50	20	50	40	14	400					15	20	60	11		32	8		80	3	24	1046
5	Petra Majdič (SLO)		24	100	45	40					10		18	~~8~~	9		52	26	100	45	36	32	100	11	6	80	50	20	80		45	40	969
6	Valentyna Shevchenko (UKR)		50		22	12			14	12		16	23			50	200	50		100		11		45	36			80		100	36	100	957
7	Arianna Follis (ITA)	50	45	10	18	16	45	18	12	18	50	9	14	25	13	18	240	40	~~5~~	32	45			40	7	13	~~4~~	36	24		32	64	934
8	Claudia Künzel-Nystad (GER)	36	29		16	36	40				14	30		10	30	30	160	22	16	15	4	50	8	26	20	26	12	11		60	100	120	921
9	Aino-Kaisa Saarinen (FIN)	20	14			60	14	~~7~~	40		~~9~~		50				56	32	36	7	20	80	50	9	60	50	22	50	50	32	26	48	826
10	Evi Sachenbacher-Stehle (GER)	9	18	20	36	32	50	36	10	14	~~8~~	20			20	13	128	18	14	29	14	15	9	50	18	40	60	8	~~6~~	29	~~7~~	26	736
11	Marit Bjørgen (NOR)	80	100	32	100																	36		29	80		40	32	14	45	22	80	690
12	Olga Rocheva (RUS)				13	20	15	20	16	16		18	25	23	25		180	60	20	36	8	24	15	16	16	7	3	18	15	10		20	639
13	Riitta-Liisa Roponen (FIN)		32		8	15	60	24		25	11	10		16		16	104	8		16	9	40		14	24		24	29		40	60	52	637
14	Pirjo Muranen (FIN)	40		29	24	14	12	~~11~~			40		11	18	16		64	9	45		80	18	40				26	1	36				523
15	Seraina Mischol (SUI)	45		14	32	3			23	11	18		12		10	10	88	16	29	22		10	45		12	29					29	44	502
16	Kristin Størmer Steira (NOR)		16		26	60						40	9		14	40	96	14		12				24	40			24		18		30	463
17	Katrin Zeller (GER)		3		12	18	32	9		20			10		23	20	116	13	4	13		6	4	10	8			60			10	56	447
18	Therese Johaug (NOR)		26		40	11			13				30		8	25	72					60		36						50	12	18	401
19	Anna Hansson (SWE)		7		20	45	16		11	23		8			18	12	80	24		14	11	3		15	45			22		20			394
20	Natalya Korostelyova (RUS)	12	13		14	22	80	60		10	13	25		40			36	29		10	6						20						390
21	Natalya Matveyeva (RUS)	100		50				32											32		50		16			4	80		1				365
22	Sabina Valbusa (ITA)		22		10	13	20	10		40						8	48			50				13	50					26	15	36	361
23	Chandra Crawford (CAN)	26						15											22		100		22			22	100		12				319
24	Yevgeniya Medvedeva (RUS)		15			5	26									9	28	80		80		7		32						15		10	307
25	Stefanie Böhler (GER)	2	8	24	5	4						23				23	32	12	8	18	29	13	5	8		11	9	4			40	16	294
26	Larisa Kurkina (RUS)		5		15	29	13		8						12		44	45	3	26					14			7		5		14	240
27	Madoka Natsumi (JPN)	18		45				13											10		13		32			60	18		29				238
28	Magda Genuin (ITA)		4	18				50			25			14			4		~~2~~	8	60		7			24	16				5		235
29	Vibeke Skofterud (NOR)		80	2	50	80	22																										234
30	Antonella Confortola (ITA)		10				18									11	40	20		20				18	13			10		22	24	28	234

==== Distance ====
Pos	Athlete	2	4	5	6	9	11	12	14	15	16	18	20	22	23	26	28	WCF	Total
1	Virpi Kuitunen (FIN)			100	10		11	40	50		36	24	100		22	100	36	200	729
2	Valentyna Shevchenko (UKR)	50	22	12		12	16	23		50	50	100	11	45	36	80	100	100	707
3	Justyna Kowalczyk (POL)	36	60	24		8	14	16			100	60	45	80	32	26		160	661
4	Astrid Uhrenholdt Jacobsen (NOR)	40	80		100	9	13	13			15	40	22	100	100	40		72	644
5	Claudia Künzel-Nystad (GER)	29	16	36	40		30		30	30	22	15	50	26	20	11	60	120	535
6	Marit Bjørgen (NOR)	100	100										36	29	80	32	45	80	502
7	Charlotte Kalla (SWE)	60	29	26		50	50	20	40	14			15	60	11	6	80	24	485
8	Aino-Kaisa Saarinen (FIN)	14		60	14			50			32	7	80	9	60	50	32	48	456
9	Arianna Follis (ITA)	45	18	16	45	18	9	14	13	18	40	32		40	7	36	24	64	439
10	Evi Sachenbacher-Stehle (GER)	18	36	32	50	14	20		20	13	18	29	15	50	18	8	29	26	396

==== Sprint ====
Pos	Athlete	1	3	7	8	10	13	17	19	21	24	25	27	29	Total
1	Petra Majdič (SLO)		100			10	8	100	36	100	80	50	80	45	609
2	Astrid Uhrenholdt Jacobsen (NOR)		80	80		12	20	80	26	80	45	7	60	80	570
3	Virpi Kuitunen (FIN)	24		29	50	23	12	50	40	60	100		100	50	538
4	Natalya Matveyeva (RUS)	100	50	32				32	50	16	4	80	1		365
5	Pirjo Muranen (FIN)	40	29	11		40	18	45	80	40		26	36		365
6	Aino-Kaisa Saarinen (FIN)	20		7	40	9		36	20	50	50	22	50	26	330
7	Chandra Crawford (CAN)	26		15				22	100	22	22	100	12		319
8	Justyna Kowalczyk (POL)		36		30	20	30	60	10	36		29	32	18	301
9	Arianna Follis (ITA)	50	10	18	12	50	25	5	45		13	4		32	264
10	Madoka Natsumi (JPN)	18	45	13				10	13	32	60	18	29		238

== Nations Cup ==
=== Overall ===
Rank	Nation	Points
1	Norway	11017
2	Finland	6067
3	Germany	6027
4	Russia	5238
5	Italy	5049
6	Sweden	4758
7	Czech Republic	2886
8	France	1702
9	Switzerland	1580
10	Slovenia	1238

=== Men ===
Rank	Nation	Points
1	Norway	6448
2	Italy	2844
3	Germany	2838
4	Czech Republic	2764
5	Sweden	2502
6	Russia	2304
7	Finland	1641
8	France	1383
9	Switzerland	807
10	United States	550

=== Women ===
Rank	Nation	Points
1	Norway	4569
2	Finland	4426
3	Germany	3189
4	Russia	2934
5	Sweden	2256
6	Italy	2205
7	Slovenia	1238
8	Poland	1156
9	Ukraine	993
10	Switzerland	773

== Achievements ==
Victories in this World Cup (all-time number of victories as of 2007/08 season in parentheses)

Men

- Lukáš Bauer (CZE), 7 (10) first places
- Axel Teichmann (GER), 2 (8) first places
- Pietro Piller Cottrer (ITA), 2 (5) first places
- Anders Gløersen (NOR), 2 (2) first places
- Tor Arne Hetland (NOR), 1 (12) first place
- Jens Arne Svartedal (NOR), 1 (12) first place
- Odd-Bjørn Hjelmeset (NOR), 1 (9) first place
- Vincent Vittoz (FRA), 1 (8) first place
- Eldar Rønning (NOR), 1 (5) first place
- René Sommerfeldt (GER), 1 (4) first place
- Petter Northug (NOR), 1 (3) first place
- Børre Næss (NOR), 1 (3) first place
- Ola Vigen Hattestad (NOR), 1 (2) first place
- Anders Södergren (SWE), 1 (2) first place
- Josef Wenzl (GER), 1 (1) first place
- Johan Kjølstad (NOR), 1 (1) first place
- Emmanuel Jonnier (FRA), 1 (1) first place
- Nikolay Morilov (RUS), 1 (1) first place
- Nikolay Pankratov (RUS), 1 (1) first place
- Valerio Checchi (ITA), 1 (1) first place
- Emil Jönsson (SWE), 1 (1) first place
- Jean-Marc Gaillard (FRA), 1 (1) first place

Women

- Virpi Kuitunen (FIN), 8 (22) first places
- Charlotte Kalla (SWE), 4 (4) first places
- Petra Majdič (SLO), 3 (7) first places
- Valentyna Shevchenko (UKR), 3 (5) first places
- Astrid Uhrenholdt Jacobsen (NOR), 3 (3) first places
- Marit Bjørgen (NOR), 2 (31) first places
- Chandra Crawford (CAN), 2 (2) first places
- Arianna Follis (ITA), 1 (3) first place
- Aino-Kaisa Saarinen (FIN), 1 (2) first place
- Justyna Kowalczyk (POL), 1 (2) first place
- Claudia Künzel-Nystad (GER), 1 (2) first place
- Natalya Matveyeva (RUS), 1 (1) first place
- Kikkan Randall (USA), 1 (1) first place
