= Gard Filip Gjerdalen =

Norwegian cross-country skier

Personal information
- Nationality: Norway
- Born: March 25, 1982 (age 44)

Sport
- Sport: Skiing
- Club: IL Holeværingen

World Cup career
- Seasons: 1 – (2006)
- Indiv. starts: 1
- Indiv. podiums: 0
- Team starts: 0
- Overall titles: 0 – (123rd in 2006)
- Discipline titles: 0

Gard Filip Gjerdalen (born 25 March 1982) is a Norwegian cross-country skier.

His only start in the World Cup to date was in March 2006 in Mora, where he finished in a fifteenth place. He also featured in many Marathon Cup races in 2006 and 2007, recording a sixth place over 50 km in January 2006 in Bedřichov.

He represents the sports club IL Holeværingen, and lives in Hole. He is the brother of fellow skiers Tord Asle Gjerdalen and Njål Tage Gjerdalen.

== Cross-country skiing results ==
All results are sourced from the International Ski Federation (FIS).

=== World Cup ===
==== Season standings ====
Season	Age			
Season	Age	Overall	Distance	Sprint
2006	24	123	87	—
