= Stephanie Santer =

Italian cross-country skier (born 1981)

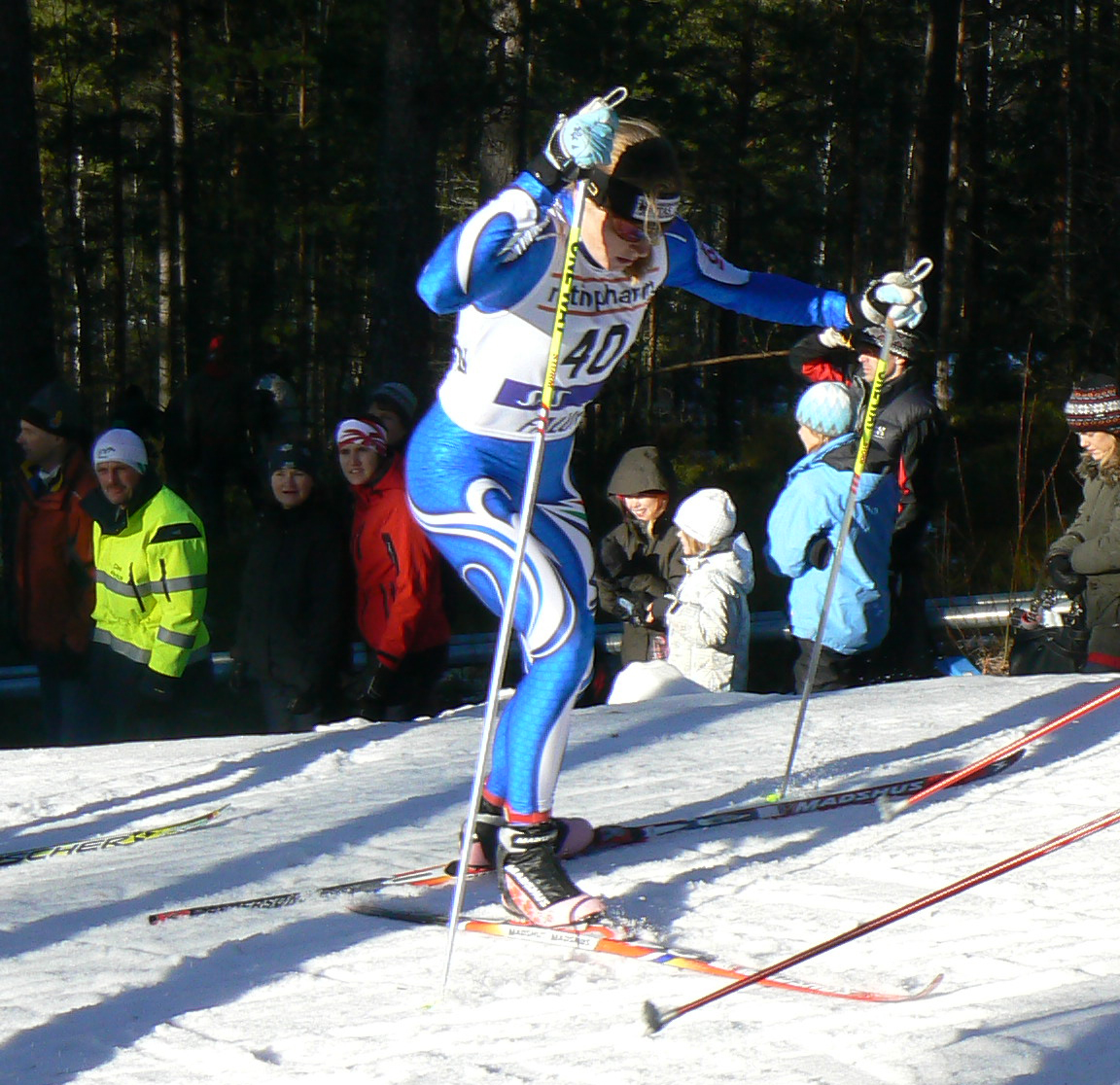
Stephanie Santer.

Stephanie Santer (born 1981) is an Italian cross-country skier.

She competed at the 2000 and 2001 Junior World Championships, managing a 16th place at best. Competing at the 2001, 2003 and 2009 Winter Universiade, she managed three top-10 placements at the latter championship, one of which in the relay.

She made her World Cup debut in December 2001 in Cogne, finishing a measly 77th, but broke the top 30-barrier in December 2005 in Nové Město na Moravě. Her career highlight was a 31st place in the 30 kilometres event at the 2007 Nordic World Ski Championships.

She represented the sports club ASC Toblach.
