= Odd-Bjørn Hjelmeset =

Norwegian cross-country skier

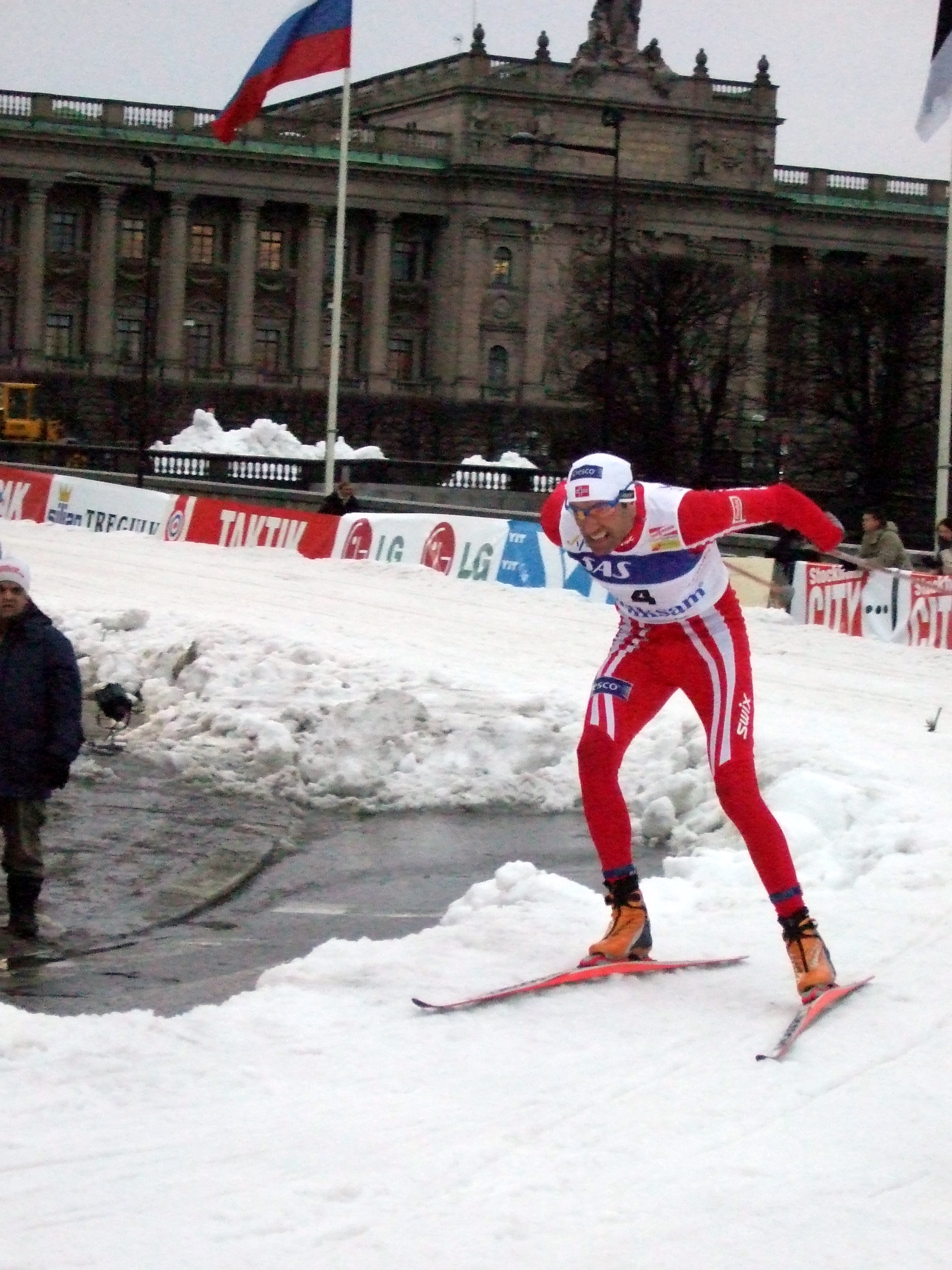
- Odd-Bjørn Hjelmeset during the Royal Palace Sprint in Stockholm, Sweden in March 2007

Personal information
- Full name: Odd-Bjørn Hjelmeset
- Nationality: Norway
- Born: 6 December 1971 (age 54) Vereide, Norway

Sport
- Sport: Skiing
- Club: Fjellhug/Vereide IL

World Cup career
- Seasons: 20 – (1993–2012)
- Indiv. starts: 140
- Indiv. podiums: 21
- Indiv. wins: 9
- Team starts: 30
- Team podiums: 17
- Team wins: 8
- Overall titles: 0 – (3rd in 2000)
- Discipline titles: 0
Medal record
Men's cross-country skiing
Representing Norway
Olympic Games
Silver medal – second place	2010 Vancouver	4 × 10 km relay
Bronze medal – third place	2002 Salt Lake City	50 km classical
World Championships
Gold medal – first place	2001 Lahti	4 × 10 km relay
Gold medal – first place	2005 Oberstdorf	4 × 10 km relay
Gold medal – first place	2007 Sapporo	50 km classical
Gold medal – first place	2007 Sapporo	4 × 10 km relay
Gold medal – first place	2009 Liberec	4 × 10 km relay
Bronze medal – third place	1999 Ramsau	10 km classical
Bronze medal – third place	2001 Lahti	15 km classical
Bronze medal – third place	2005 Oberstdorf	50 km classical
Junior World Championships
Gold medal – first place	1991 Reit im Winkl	4 × 10 km relay

Odd-Bjørn Hjelmeset (born 6 December 1971 in Nordfjordeid) is a Norwegian former cross-country skier who competed from 1993 to 2012.

A classical technique specialist, Hjelmeset's biggest success is the gold medal in the 50 km event at the FIS Nordic World Ski Championships 2007 in Sapporo. At the FIS Nordic World Ski Championships he won eight medals (all in the classical style). This includes five gold medals (50 km: 2007, 4 × 10 km relay: 2001, 2005, 2007, 2009) and three bronze medals (1999: 10 km, 2001: 15 km, and 2005: 50 km).

Hjelmeset has also competed on the national level in athletics, and won the bronze medal at the Norwegian championships in the 3000 metre steeplechase in 1996 and 1999.

The 2007 season was Hjelmeset's best. He won two gold medals at the World Championships in Sapporo, then a World Cup race in Lahti, before winning the 50 km individual start in Holmenkollen where he had won the sprint event in 2000. Hjelmeset was awarded the Holmenkollen medal in 2007 (Shared with Frode Estil, King Harald V, and Queen Sonja).

He retired after he failed to qualify for the 2011 Nordic World Ski Championships in Oslo. He last World Cup race was the 50 kilometre at the 2012 Holmenkollen Ski Festival, where he finished 52nd.

== Cross-country skiing results ==
All results are sourced from the International Ski Federation (FIS).

=== Olympic Games ===
- 2 medals – (1 silver, 1 bronze)

Year	Age	15 km	Pursuit	30 km	50 km	Sprint	4 × 10 km relay	Team sprint
2002	30	20	—	—	Bronze	—	—	—N/a
2006	34	27	—	—N/a	—	—	5	—
2010	38	—	—	—N/a	17	—	Silver	—

=== World Championships ===
- 8 medals – (5 gold, 3 bronze)

Year	Age	10 km	15 km	Pursuit	30 km	50 km	Sprint	4 × 10 km relay	Team sprint
1999	27	Bronze	—N/a	17	—	28	—N/a	—	—N/a
2001	29	—N/a	Bronze	—	5	—	—	Gold	—N/a
2003	31	—N/a	10	DNF	8	—	—	—	—N/a
2005	33	—N/a	—	DNF	—N/a	Bronze	5	Gold	—
2007	35	—N/a	—	—	—N/a	Gold	7	Gold	—
2009	37	—N/a	15	—	—N/a	—	—	Gold	—

=== World Cup ===
==== Season standings ====
Season	Age	Discipline standings					Ski Tour standings		
Season	Age	Overall	Distance	Long Distance	Middle Distance	Sprint	Nordic Opening	Tour de Ski	World Cup Final
1993	21	100	—N/a	—N/a	—N/a	—N/a	—N/a	—N/a	—N/a
1994	22	NC	—N/a	—N/a	—N/a	—N/a	—N/a	—N/a	—N/a
1995	23	77	—N/a	—N/a	—N/a	—N/a	—N/a	—N/a	—N/a
1996	24	48	—N/a	—N/a	—N/a	—N/a	—N/a	—N/a	—N/a
1997	25	38	—N/a	34	—N/a	46	—N/a	—N/a	—N/a
1998	26	20	—N/a	11	—N/a	27	—N/a	—N/a	—N/a
1999	27	17	—N/a	29	—N/a	11	—N/a	—N/a	—N/a
2000	28	3rd place, bronze medalist(s)	—N/a	17	5	2nd place, silver medalist(s)	—N/a	—N/a	—N/a
2001	29	5	—N/a	—N/a	—N/a	13	—N/a	—N/a	—N/a
2002	30	25	—N/a	—N/a	—N/a	74	—N/a	—N/a	—N/a
2003	31	25	—N/a	—N/a	—N/a	26	—N/a	—N/a	—N/a
2004	32	35	34	—N/a	—N/a	26	—N/a	—N/a	—N/a
2005	33	14	17	—N/a	—N/a	19	—N/a	—N/a	—N/a
2006	34	18	39	—N/a	—N/a	14	—N/a	—N/a	—N/a
2007	35	5	3rd place, bronze medalist(s)	—N/a	—N/a	16	—N/a	DNF	—N/a
2008	36	18	12	—N/a	—N/a	40	—N/a	22	—
2009	37	72	45	—N/a	—N/a	NC	—N/a	—	—
2010	38	98	57	—N/a	—N/a	NC	—N/a	—	—
2011	39	124	76	—N/a	—N/a	—	—	—	—
2012	40	NC	NC	—N/a	—N/a	—	—	—	—

==== Individual podiums ====
- 9 victories (8 WC, 1 SWC)
- 21 podiums (19 WC, 2 SWC)

No.	Season	Date	Location	Race	Level	Place
1	1997–98	13 March 1998	Oslo, Norway	50 km Individual C	World Cup	2nd
2	1998–99	22 February 1999	Ramsau, Austria	10 km Individual C	World Championships^{[1]}	3rd
3	1999–00	27 November 1999	Kiruna, Sweden	15 km Individual C	World Cup	1st
4	1999–00	27 December 1999	Engelberg, Switzerland	1.0 km Sprint C	World Cup	3rd
5	1999–00	28 February 2000	Stockholm, Sweden	1.0 km Sprint C	World Cup	1st
6	1999–00	8 March 2000	Oslo, Norway	1.0 km Sprint C	World Cup	1st
7	1999–00	17 March 2000	Bormio, Italy	10 km Individual C	World Cup	2nd
8	2000–01	25 November 2000	Beitostølen, Norway	15 km Individual C	World Cup	1st
9	2000–01	20 December 2000	Davos, Switzerland	30 km Individual C	World Cup	3rd
10	2000–01	1 February 2001	Asiago, Italy	1.5 km Sprint F	World Cup	1st
11	2003–04	18 February 2004	Stockholm, Sweden	1.1 km Sprint C	World Cup	3rd
12	2004–05	13 February 2005	Reit im Winkl, Germany	1.2 km Sprint C	World Cup	2nd
13	2004–05	12 March 2005	Oslo, Norway	50 km Individual C	World Cup	3rd
14	2005–06	22 January 2006	Oberstdorf, Germany	1.2 km Sprint C	World Cup	1st
15	2006–07	25 November 2006	Rukatunturi, Finland	1.2 km Sprint C	World Cup	2nd
16	2006–07	27 January 2007	Otepää, Estonia	15 km Individual C	World Cup	3rd
17	2006–07	11 March 2007	Lahti, Finland	15 km Individual C	World Cup	1st
18	2006–07	17 March 2007	Oslo, Norway	50 km Individual C	World Cup	1st
19	2007–08	8 December 2007	Davos, Switzerland	15 km Individual C	World Cup	2nd
20	2007–08	28 December 2007	Nové Město, Czech Republic	4.5 km Individual C	Stage World Cup	3rd
21	2007–08	5 January 2008	Val di Fiemme, Italy	20 km Mass Start C	Stage World Cup	1st

Note: ^{1} Until the 1999 World Championships, World Championship races were included in the World Cup scoring system.

==== Team podiums ====
- 8 victories (8 RL)
- 17 podiums (16 RL, 1 TS)

No.	Season	Date	Location	Race	Level	Place	Teammate(s)
1	1996–97	9 March 1997	Falun, Sweden	4 × 10 km Relay C/F	World Cup	2nd	Skaanes / Sørgård / Alsgaard
2	1998–99	10 January 1999	Nové Město, Czech Republic	4 × 10 km Relay C/F	World Cup	3rd	Jevne / Jermstad / Hetland
3	1998–99	21 March 1999	Oslo, Norway	4 × 10 km Relay C	World Cup	1st	Estil / Bjervig / Aukland
4	1999–00	19 December 1999	Davos, Switzerland	4 x 10 km Relay C	World Cup	1st	Jevne / Bjervig / Estil
5	1999–00	13 January 2000	Nové Město, Czech Republic	4 ×10 km Relay C/F	World Cup	1st	Jevne / Skjeldal / Alsgaard
6	2000–01	26 November 2000	Beitostølen, Norway	4 × 10 km Relay C/F	World Cup	1st	Bjonviken / Skjeldal / Hetland
7	2001–02	24 November 2001	Kuopio, Finland	4 × 10 km Relay C/F	World Cup	1st	Jevne / Bjerkeli / Hetland
8	2002–03	8 December 2002	Davos, Switzerland	4 × 10 km Relay C/F	World Cup	3rd	Estil / Skjeldal / Bjervig
9	2003–04	23 November 2003	Beitostølen, Norway	4 × 10 km Relay C/F	World Cup	2nd	Svartedal / Berger / Hofstad
10	2003–04	22 February 2004	Umeå, Sweden	4 × 10 km Relay C/F	World Cup	2nd	Estil / Skjeldal / Hofstad
11	2003–04	6 March 2004	Lahti, Finland	6 × 1.0 km Team Sprint C	World Cup	3rd	Svartedal
12	2004–05	12 December 2004	Lago di Tesero, Italy	4 × 10 km Relay C/F	World Cup	1st	Svartedal / Estil / Hofstad
13	2004–05	20 March 2005	Falun, Sweden	4 × 10 km Relay C/F	World Cup	1st	Svartedal / Skjeldal / Hofstad
14	2005–06	15 January 2006	Lago di Tesero, Italy	4 × 10 km Relay C/F	World Cup	3rd	Svartedal / Gjerdalen / Hofstad
15	2006–07	25 March 2007	Falun, Sweden	4 × 10 km Relay C/F	World Cup	1st	Pettersen / Estil / Northug
16	2007–08	23 November 2007	Beitostølen, Norway	4 × 10 km Relay C/F	World Cup	2nd	Rønning / Eilifsen / Gjerdalen
17	2007–08	24 February 2008	Falun, Sweden	4 × 10 km Relay C/F	World Cup	2nd	Svartedal / Østensen / Gjerdalen
