= Tord Asle Gjerdalen =

Norwegian cross-country skier

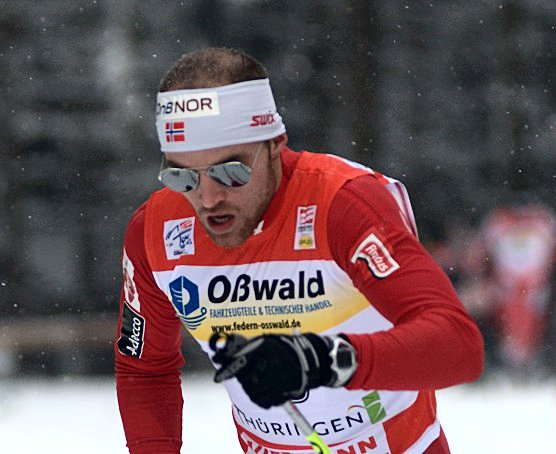
- Tord Asle Gjerdalen in 2010

Personal information
- Full name: Tord Asle Gjerdalen
- Nationality: Norway
- Born: 3 August 1983 (age 42) Ringerike, Norway

Sport
- Sport: Skiing
- Club: Fossum IF

World Cup career
- Seasons: 11 – (2004, 2006–2015)
- Indiv. starts: 111
- Indiv. podiums: 2
- Indiv. wins: 0
- Team starts: 16
- Team podiums: 6
- Team wins: 1
- Overall titles: 0 – (4th in 2008)
- Discipline titles: 0
Medal record
Men's cross-country skiing
Representing Norway
World Championships
Gold medal – first place	2011 Oslo	4 × 10 km relay
Gold medal – first place	2013 Val di Fiemme	4 × 10 km relay
Bronze medal – third place	2011 Oslo	50 km freestyle
Bronze medal – third place	2013 Val di Fiemme	15 km freestyle
Junior World Championships
Silver medal – second place	2003 Sollefteå	4 × 10 km relay

Tord Asle Gjerdalen (born 3 August 1983) is a Norwegian cross-country skier

== Career ==
In his early career, he finished ninth in the 30 km event at the 2003 Junior World Championships. He made his debut in the World Cup in February 2004 in Trondheim, where he finished 67th in the sprint race. He also competed in the 50 km event in Oslo the same month, where he finished 50th. In a Marathon Cup race in March 2005 in Mora, he finished sixth. Already at the 2005–06 World Cup opener in Beitostølen, in November 2005, he collected his first World Cup points with a twelfth place in the 15 km event. He followed up with a thirteenth and a fifteenth place in December, in Canmore and Nové Město respectively. In January 2006 in Lago di Tesero he finished among the top ten for the first time, with a seventh place in the 30 km event. He finished among the top five for the first time with a fourth place in March 2006 in Falun. At the 2006 Winter Olympics he finished seventeenth in the 2 × 15 km pursuit, and fifteenth in the 50 km freestyle event. He also became a part of the Norwegian national cross-country skiing squad. He had been offered a team spot twice before, but rejected both times, as it would interfere with his medicine studies.

In the 2006–07 World Cup he did not compete often. Except for relay events, his best placement was tenth in the 50 km event at Holmenkollen in March 2007. In the 2007–08 World Cup, however, he opened with a seventh place at Beitostølen, and recorded a ninth place in Rybinsk right before the Tour de Ski. He performed well here, with two fourth places, one sixth place and a ninth place, and he ended up in fourth in the overall standings. He recorded an eleventh and a sixteenth place in January 2008 in Canmore, and finished on the podium for the first time. He was runner-up both in Falun in February and Bormio in March. He ended eleventh in his last race for the season.

The 2008–09 World Cup season was more unstable. He did finish fifth in La Clusaz in December 2008, but also recorded a 58th, 47th, and 36th place. In the 2008-09 Tour de Ski a twelfth place was his best achievement, and he ended 23rd overall. A sixth place in Rybinsk in January 2009 followed, and at the Nordic World Ski Championships 2009 he finished fourteenth in the 2 × 15 km pursuit, and twentieth in the 50 km freestyle event. The rest of his World Cup showings that season, including the World Cup finale in Sweden, were poor. He opened the 2009–10 World Cup season with a relay race in Beitostølen.

At the 2010 Winter Olympics, Gjerdalen finished 19th in the 30 km mixed pursuit and 28th in the 15 km events.

At the Oslo 2011 World Championships Gjerdalen received a bronze medal in the men's 50 km freestyle and a gold medal in the men's 4 × 10 km relay, racing the third leg for Norway.

He won the Marcialonga in 2015, 2016 and 2017. In March 2021, he won Vasaloppet, and was noticed for the record time 3:28:18.

== Cross-country skiing results ==
All results are sourced from the International Ski Federation (FIS).

=== Olympic Games ===
Year	Age	15 km individual	30 km skiathlon	50 km mass start	Sprint	4 × 10 km relay	Team sprint
2006	22	—	17	15	—	—	—
2010	26	28	19	—	—	—	—
2014	30	—	20	21	—	—	—

=== World Championships ===
- 4 medals – (2 gold, 2 bronze)

Year	Age	15 km individual	30 km skiathlon	50 km mass start	Sprint	4 × 10 km relay	Team sprint
2009	25	—	14	20	—	—	—
2011	27	—	17	Bronze	—	Gold	—
2013	29	Bronze	12	6	—	Gold	—

=== World Cup ===
==== Season standings ====
Season	Age	Discipline standings			Ski Tour standings		
Season	Age	Overall	Distance	Sprint	Nordic Opening	Tour de Ski	World Cup Final
2004	20	NC	NC	NC	—N/a	—N/a	—N/a
2006	22	34	22	—	—N/a	—N/a	—N/a
2007	23	85	51	—	—N/a	—	—N/a
2008	24	4	9	18	—N/a	4	7
2009	25	40	32	66	—N/a	22	44
2010	26	39	35	86	—N/a	13	DNF
2011	27	33	24	73	—	16	—
2012	28	150	96	NC	30	—	—
2013	29	50	41	NC	—	21	29
2014	30	30	36	NC	—	6	—
2015	31	NC	NC	—	—	—	—N/a

==== Individual podiums ====
- 2 podiums (2 WC)

No.	Season	Date	Location	Race	Level	Place
1	2007–08	23 February 2008	Falun, Sweden	15 km + 15 km Pursuit C/F	World Cup	2nd
2	2007–08	14 March 2008	Bormio, Italy	3.3 km Individual F	World Cup	2nd

==== Team podiums ====
- 1 victory – (1 RL)
- 6 podiums – (6 RL)

No.	Season	Date	Location	Race	Level	Place	Teammates
1	2005–06	15 January 2006	Lago di Tesero, Italy	4 × 10 km Relay C/F	World Cup	3rd	Hjelmeset / Svartedal / Hofstad
2	2007–08	25 November 2007	Beitostølen, Norway	4 × 10 km Relay C/F	World Cup	2nd	Rønning / Hjelmeset / Eilifsen
3	2007–08	24 February 2008	Falun, Sweden	4 × 10 km Relay C/F	World Cup	2nd	Svartedal / Hjelmeset / Østensen
4	2008–09	7 December 2008	La Clusaz, France	4 × 10 km Relay C/F	World Cup	1st	Hetland / Sundby / Northug
5	2009–10	7 March 2010	Lahti, Finland	4 × 10 km Relay C/F	World Cup	2nd	Rønning / Sundby / Eliassen
6	2010–11	19 December 2010	La Clusaz, France	4 × 10 km Relay C/F	World Cup	2nd	Rønning / Sundby / Northug

== Personal life ==
Gjerdalen is the brother of fellow skiers Gard Filip Gjerdalen and Njål Tage Gjerdalen. He lives in Hole, formerly represented the local sports club IL Holeværingen before changing club to Fossum IF. He is known for his trademark aviator glasses, which he chooses over the more specialised winter-sports eyewear of his rivals.
