= Ivan Ivanov (cross-country skier) =

Russian cross-country skier

Personal information
- Nationality: Russia
- Born: 11 May 1987 (age 39)

Sport
- Sport: Skiing

World Cup career
- Seasons: 2 – (2008–2009)
- Indiv. starts: 15
- Indiv. podiums: 1
- Indiv. wins: 0
- Team starts: 2
- Team podiums: 0
- Overall titles: 0 – (54th in 2008)
- Discipline titles: 0
Medal record
Men's cross-country skiing
Representing Russia
Junior World Championships
Gold medal – first place	2007 Tarvisio	Individual sprint
Silver medal – second place	2007 Tarvisio	4 × 5 km relay

Ivan Alexeyevich Ivanov (Russian: Иван Алексеевич Иванов; born 11 May 1987) is a Russian cross-country skier who has competed between 2005 and 2012. His best World Cup finish was second in a sprint event in Canada in 2008.

== Cross-country skiing results ==
All results are sourced from the International Ski Federation (FIS).

=== World Cup ===
==== Season standings ====
Season	Age	Discipline standings			Ski Tour standings	
Season	Age	Overall	Distance	Sprint	Tour de Ski	World Cup Final
2008	20	54	NC	21	—	59
2009	21	132	—	78	—	—

==== Individual podiums ====
- 1 podium – (1 WC)

No.	Season	Date	Location	Race	Level	Place
1	2007–08	26 January 2008	Canmore, Canada	1.1 km Sprint F	World Cup	2nd
