= Lukáš Bauer =

Czech cross-country skier

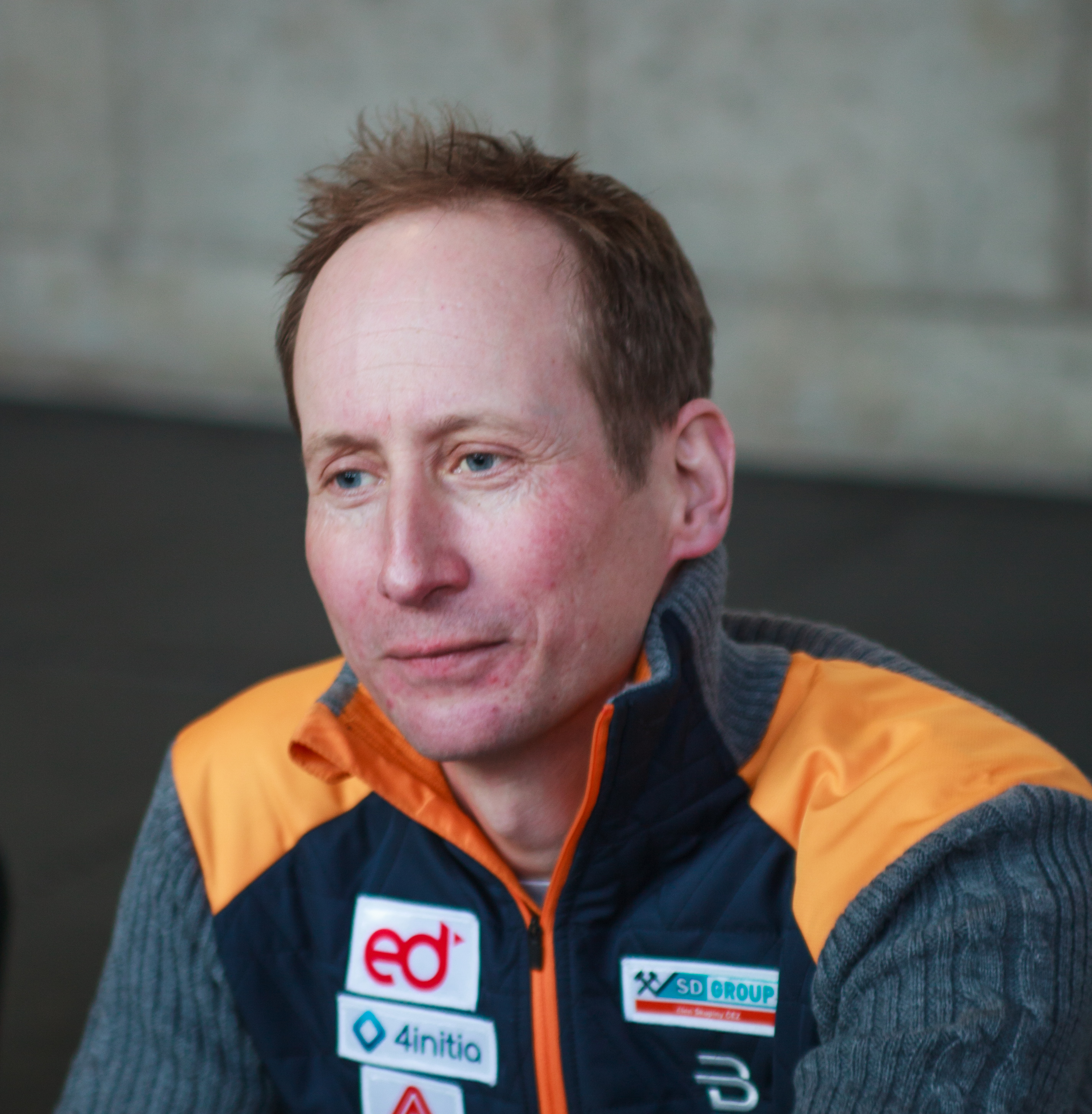
- Lukáš Bauer in February 2019

Personal information
- Nationality: Czech Republic
- Born: 18 August 1977 (age 48) Ostrov nad Ohří, Czechoslovak Socialist Republic
- Height: 1.81 m (5 ft 11 in)

Sport
- Sport: Skiing
- Club: Dukla Liberec

World Cup career
- Seasons: 21 – (1997–2017)
- Indiv. starts: 237
- Indiv. podiums: 38
- Indiv. wins: 18
- Team starts: 32
- Team podiums: 5
- Team wins: 1
- Overall titles: 1 – (2008)
- Discipline titles: 1 – (DI)
Medal record
Men's cross-country skiing
Representing Czech Republic
Olympic Games
Silver medal – second place	2006 Turin	15 km classical
Bronze medal – third place	2010 Vancouver	15 km freestyle
Bronze medal – third place	2010 Vancouver	4 × 10 km relay
World Championships
Silver medal – second place	2009 Liberec	15 km classical
Silver medal – second place	2015 Falun	50 km classical
Junior World Championships
Silver medal – second place	1997 Canmore	30 km freestyle

Lukáš Bauer (Czech pronunciation: [ˈlukaːʃ ˈbauɛr]; born 18 August 1977) is a Czech cross-country skier who has competed since 1996.

== Biography ==
On 17 February 2006 he won the Winter Olympics silver medal for the 15 km cross-country classical.

His best finish at the FIS Nordic World Ski Championships was second in the 15 km classic in 2009.

Bauer is son-in-law of another Czech skier Helena Balatková-Šikolová.

In season 2007–08 he was overall winner of the men's version of the Tour de Ski and FIS Cross-Country World Cup. In 2010, he again won the Tour de Ski in a dramatic come-from-behind victory over Norwegian skier Petter Northug.

Bauer finished with the bronze medal in the 15 km freestyle event at the 2010 Winter Olympics.

After a career in which he collected three Olympic and two World Championship medals, Bauer confirmed his retirement from competing for the Czech national team after the 2017 Nordic World Championships in Lahti, although he indicated that he would continue competing in long-distance races for his own team, which he had set up three years previously. In April 2019 he was named as the Visma Ski Classics Pro Team Director of the year for his work with his ED System Bauer Team. The following month, he was announced as head coach of the Polish men's cross-country ski team.

== Cross-country skiing results ==
All results are sourced from the International Ski Federation (FIS).

=== Olympic Games ===
- 3 medals – (1 silver, 2 bronze)

Year	Age	10 km	15 km	Pursuit	30 km	50 km	Sprint	4 × 10 km relay	Team sprint
1998	20	45	—N/a	32	33	DNS	—N/a	15	—N/a
2002	24	—N/a	—	12	6	8	—	7	—N/a
2006	28	—N/a	Silver	10	—N/a	16	—	9	—
2010	32	—N/a	Bronze	7	—N/a	12	—	Bronze	—
2014	36	—N/a	5	—	—N/a	31	—	8	—

=== World Championships ===
- 2 medals – (2 silver)

Year	Age	10 km	15 km	Pursuit	30 km	50 km	Sprint	4 × 10 km relay	Team sprint
1997	19	47	—N/a	DNF	—	—	—N/a	8	—N/a
1999	21	20	—N/a	13	—	DNF	—N/a	8	—N/a
2001	23	—N/a	22	17	26	27	—	14	—N/a
2003	25	—N/a	17	20	—	—	—	7	—N/a
2005	27	—N/a	5	34	—N/a	11	—	8	—
2007	29	—N/a	—	7	—N/a	5	—	8	—
2009	31	—N/a	Silver	25	—N/a	—	—	11	—
2011	33	—N/a	7	—	—N/a	13	—	8	—
2013	35	—N/a	19	23	—N/a	16	—	11	—
2015	37	—N/a	7	—	—N/a	Silver	—	—	—
2017	39	—N/a	19	—	—N/a	—	—	11	—

=== World Cup ===
==== Season titles ====
- 2 titles – (1 overall, 1 distance)

Season
Season	Discipline
2008	Overall
2008	Distance

==== Season standings ====
Season	Age	Discipline standings					Ski Tour standings			
Season	Age	Overall	Distance	Long Distance	Middle Distance	Sprint	Nordic Opening	Tour de Ski	World Cup Final	Ski Tour Canada
1997	19	NC	—N/a	NC	—N/a	—	—N/a	—N/a	—N/a	—N/a
1998	20	NC	—N/a	NC	—N/a	—	—N/a	—N/a	—N/a	—N/a
1999	21	42	—N/a	53	—N/a	68	—N/a	—N/a	—N/a	—N/a
2000	22	61	—N/a	35	48	NC	—N/a	—N/a	—N/a	—N/a
2001	23	70	—N/a	—N/a	—N/a	NC	—N/a	—N/a	—N/a	—N/a
2002	24	11	—N/a	—N/a	—N/a	—	—N/a	—N/a	—N/a	—N/a
2003	25	5	—N/a	—N/a	—N/a	—	—N/a	—N/a	—N/a	—N/a
2004	26	11	9	—N/a	—N/a	NC	—N/a	—N/a	—N/a	—N/a
2005	27	12	9	—N/a	—N/a	—	—N/a	—N/a	—N/a	—N/a
2006	28	20	11	—N/a	—N/a	—	—N/a	—N/a	—N/a	—N/a
2007	29	37	19	—N/a	—N/a	—	—N/a	—	—N/a	—N/a
2008	30	1st place, gold medalist(s)	1st place, gold medalist(s)	—N/a	—N/a	35	—N/a	1st place, gold medalist(s)	2nd place, silver medalist(s)	—N/a
2009	31	9	5	—N/a	—N/a	NC	—N/a	10	12	—N/a
2010	32	2nd place, silver medalist(s)	2nd place, silver medalist(s)	—N/a	—N/a	NC	—N/a	1st place, gold medalist(s)	10	—N/a
2011	33	4	3rd place, bronze medalist(s)	—N/a	—N/a	NC	9	3rd place, bronze medalist(s)	7	—N/a
2012	34	13	13	—N/a	—N/a	NC	9	6	—	—N/a
2013	35	12	13	—N/a	—N/a	NC	24	6	22	—N/a
2014	36	20	10	—N/a	—N/a	NC	11	DNF	13	—N/a
2015	37	71	42	—N/a	—N/a	NC	32	—	—N/a	—N/a
2016	38	61	48	—N/a	—N/a	NC	—	—	—N/a	17
2017	39	167	116	—N/a	—N/a	—	—	—	—	—N/a

==== Individual podiums ====
- 18 victories – (11 WC, 7 SWC)
- 38 podiums – (27 WC, 11 SWC)

No.	Season	Date	Location	Race	Level	Place
1	2002–03	30 November 2002	Rukatunturi, Finland	30 km Individual C	World Cup	2nd
2	2002–03	18 January 2003	Nové Město, Czech Republic	15 km Individual F	World Cup	1st
3	2002–03	16 March 2003	Lahti, Finland	15 km Individual F	World Cup	2nd
4	2003–04	13 February 2004	Oberstdorf, Germany	15 km + 15 km Pursuit C/F	World Cup	3rd
5	2003–04	16 March 2003	Oslo, Norway	50 km Individual F	World Cup	3rd
6	2004–05	22 January 2005	Pragelato, Italy	15 km + 15 km Pursuit C/F	World Cup	1st
7	2004–05	6 March 2005	Lahti, Finland	15 km Individual F	World Cup	1st
8	2005–06	31 December 2005	Nové Město, Czech Republic	15 km Individual F	World Cup	2nd
9	2005–06	7 January 2006	Otepää, Estonia	15 km Individual C	World Cup	2nd
10	2007–08	24 November 2007	Beitostølen, Norway	15 km Individual F	World Cup	2nd
11	2007–08	2 December 2007	Rukatunturi, Finland	15 km Individual C	World Cup	1st
12	2007–08	28 December 2007	Nové Město, Czech Republic	4.5 km Individual C	Stage World Cup	1st
13	2007–08	29 January 2007	Nové Město, Czech Republic	15 km Pursuit F	Stage World Cup	2nd
14	2007–08	2 January 2008	Nové Město, Czech Republic	15 km Individual C	Stage World Cup	1st
15	2007–08	28 December 2007 – 6 January 2008	(Czech Republic) (Italy) Tour de Ski	Overall Standings	World Cup	1st
16	2007–08	9 February 2008	Otepää, Estonia	15 km Individual C	World Cup	1st
17	2007–08	16 February 2008	Liberec, Czech Republic	11.4 km Individual F	World Cup	2nd
18	2007–08	23 February 2008	Falun, Sweden	15 km + 15 km Pursuit C/F	World Cup	1st
19	2007–08	2 March 2008	Lahti, Finland	15 km Individual C	World Cup	1st
20	2007–08	8 March 2008	Oslo, Norway	50 km Individual F	World Cup	2nd
21	2007–08	16 March 2008	Bormio, Italy	15 km Pursuit F	World Cup	2nd
22	2008–09	30 November 2008	Rukatunturi, Finland	15 km Individual C	World Cup	2nd
23	2008–09	24 January 2009	Otepää, Estonia	15 km Individual C	World Cup	1st
24	2009–10	7 January 2010	Cortina-Toblach, Italy	10 km Individual C	Stage World Cup	2nd
25	2009–10	9 January 2010	Val di Fiemme, Italy	20 km Mass Start C	Stage World Cup	1st
26	2009–10	10 January 2010	Val di Fiemme, Italy	10 km Pursuit F	Stage World Cup	1st
27	2009–10	1–10 January 2010	(Germany) (Czech Republic) (Italy) Tour de Ski	Overall Standings	World Cup	1st
28	2009–10	16 January 2010	Otepää, Estonia	15 km Individual C	World Cup	1st
29	2009–10	6 March 2010	Lahti, Finland	15 km + 15 km Pursuit C/F	World Cup	2nd
30	2009–10	20 March 2010	Falun, Sweden	10 km + 10 km Pursuit C/F	Stage World Cup	3rd
31	2010–11	28 November 2010	Rukatunturi, Finland	15 km Pursuit F	Stage World Cup	1st
32	2010–11	11 December 2010	Davos, Switzerland	15 km Individual C	World Cup	3rd
33	2010–11	9 January 2011	Val di Fiemme, Italy	9 km Pursuit F	Stage World Cup	1st
34	2010–11	31 December 2010 – 9 January 2011	(Germany) (Italy) Tour de Ski	Overall Standings	World Cup	3rd
35	2010–11	20 March 2011	Falun, Sweden	15 km Pursuit F	Stage World Cup	3rd
36	2011–12	10 December 2011	Davos, Switzerland	30 km Individual F	World Cup	3rd
37	2011–12	22 January 2012	Otepää, Estonia	15 km Individual C	World Cup	2nd
38	2013–14	30 November 2013	Rukatunturi, Finland	10 km Individual C	Stage World Cup	1st

==== Team podiums ====
- 1 victory – (1 RL)
- 5 podiums – (4 RL, 1 TS)

No.	Season	Date	Location	Race	Level	Place	Teammate(s)
1	2001–02	3 March 2002	Lahti, Finland	6 × 1.5 km Team Sprint F	World Cup	3rd	Koukal
2	2006–07	19 November 2006	Gällivare, Sweden	4 × 10 km Relay C/F	World Cup	3rd	Koukal / Magál / Šperl
3	2007–08	9 December 2007	Davos, Switzerland	4 × 10 km Relay C/F	World Cup	1st	Jakš / Šperl / Koukal
4	2007–08	24 February 2008	Falun, Sweden	4 × 10 km Relay C/F	World Cup	3rd	Jakš / Magál / Koukal
5	2012–13	20 January 2013	La Clusaz, France	4 × 7.5 km Relay C/F	World Cup	3rd	Magál / Razým / Jakš
