= Ingri Aunet Tyldum =

Norwegian cross-country skier

Personal information
- Nationality: Norway
- Born: 4 November 1983 (age 42) Overhalla Municipality, Norway

Sport
- Sport: Skiing
- Club: Overhalla IL

World Cup career
- Seasons: 6 – (2003–2004, 2007–2010)
- Indiv. starts: 27
- Indiv. podiums: 0
- Team starts: 3
- Team podiums: 1
- Team wins: 1
- Overall titles: 0 – (36th in 2008)
- Discipline titles: 0

Ingri Aunet Tyldum (born 14 October 1983 in Overhalla Municipality) is a Norwegian cross-country skier who has competed since 2002. Her best World Cup finish was eighth in a sprint event in Sweden in 2008.

== Cross-country skiing results ==
All results are sourced from the International Ski Federation (FIS).

=== World Cup ===
==== Season standings ====
Season	Age	Discipline standings			Ski Tour standings	
Season	Age	Overall	Distance	Sprint	Tour de Ski	World Cup Final
2003	19	NC	—N/a	NC	—N/a	—N/a
2004	20	NC	NC	NC	—N/a	—N/a
2007	23	93	89	62	—	—N/a
2008	24	36	32	33	—	26
2009	25	109	NC	72	—	—
2010	26	NC	—	NC	—	—

==== Team podiums ====
- 1 victory
- 1 podium

No.	Season	Date	Location	Race	Level	Place	Teammates
1	2007–08	24 February 2008	Falun, Sweden	4 × 5 km Relay C/F	World Cup	1st	Jacobsen / Steira / Bjørgen
