= Larisa Kurkina =

Russian cross-country skier

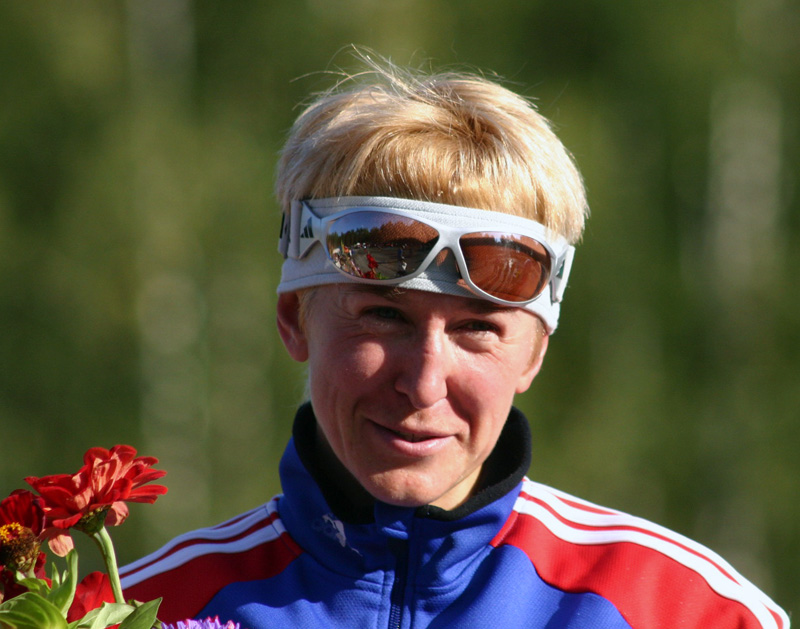
- Larisa Kurkina in 2004

Personal information
- Nationality: Russia
- Born: 18 December 1973 (age 52) Bryansk, Soviet Union

Sport
- Sport: Skiing

World Cup career
- Seasons: 7 – (2003–2006, 2008–2010)
- Indiv. starts: 73
- Indiv. podiums: 0
- Team starts: 14
- Team podiums: 7
- Team wins: 2
- Overall titles: 0 – (17th in 2004)
- Discipline titles: 0
Medal record
Women's cross-country skiing
Representing Russia
Olympic Games
Gold medal – first place	2006 Turin	4 × 5 km relay
World Championships
Silver medal – second place	2005 Oberstdorf	4 × 5 km relay

Larisa Nikolaevna Kurkina (Russian: Лариса Николаевна Куркина) born 18 December 1973) is a Russian cross-country skier who has competed since 2002. She won a gold medal in the 4 × 5 km relay at the 2006 Winter Olympics in Turin.

Kurkina won a silver medal in the 4 × 5 km relay at the 2005 FIS Nordic World Ski Championships and finished fifth in the 30 km at those same championships. She also has one individual victory in a 2004 individual sprint event in Russia.

== Cross-country skiing results ==
All results are sourced from the International Ski Federation (FIS).

=== Olympic Games ===
- 1 medal – (1 gold)

Year	Age	10 km individual	15 km skiathlon	30 km mass start	Sprint	4 × 5 km relay	Team sprint
2006	32	19	—	—	—	Gold	—

=== World Championships ===
- 1 medal – (1 silver)

Year	Age	10 km individual	15 km skiathlon	30 km mass start	Sprint	4 × 5 km relay	Team sprint
2005	31	—	9	5	20	—	Silver

=== World Cup ===
==== Season standings ====
Season	Age	Discipline standings			Ski Tour standings	
Season	Age	Overall	Distance	Sprint	Tour de Ski	World Cup Final
2003	29	NC	—N/a	—	—N/a	—N/a
2004	30	17	14	39	—N/a	—N/a
2005	31	20	15	53	—N/a	—N/a
2006	32	50	34	—	—N/a	—N/a
2008	34	26	22	57	20	23
2009	35	38	31	NC	20	—
2010	36	95	68	—	—	—

==== Team podiums ====
- 2 victories – (2 RL)
- 7 podiums – (6 RL, 1 TS)

No.	Season	Date	Location	Race	Level	Place	Teammate(s)
1	2003–04	14 December 2003	Davos, Switzerland	4 × 5 km Relay C/F	World Cup	3rd	Vasilyeva / Vorontsova / Zavyalova
2	2003–04	7 February 2004	La Clusaz, France	4 × 5 km Relay C/F	World Cup	1st	Vasilyeva / Vorontsova / Zavyalova
3	2003–04	22 February 2004	Umeå, Sweden	4 × 5 km Relay C/F	World Cup	2nd	Zavyalova / Vorontsova / Chepalova
4	2003–04	6 March 2004	Lahti, Finland	6 × 1.0 km Team Sprint C	World Cup	3rd	Zavyalova
5	2004–05	12 December 2004	Val di Fiemme, Italy	4 × 5 km Relay C/F	World Cup	1st	Baranova-Masalkina / Medvedeva-Arbuzova / Chepalova
6	2004–05	20 March 2005	Falun, Sweden	4 × 5 km Relay C/F	World Cup	3rd	Baranova-Masalkina / Medvedeva-Arbuzova / Chepalova
7	2007–08	9 December 2007	Davos, Switzerland	4 × 5 km Relay C/F	World Cup	3rd	Rocheva / Chekalyova / Korostelyova
