= Seraina Mischol =

Swiss cross-country skier

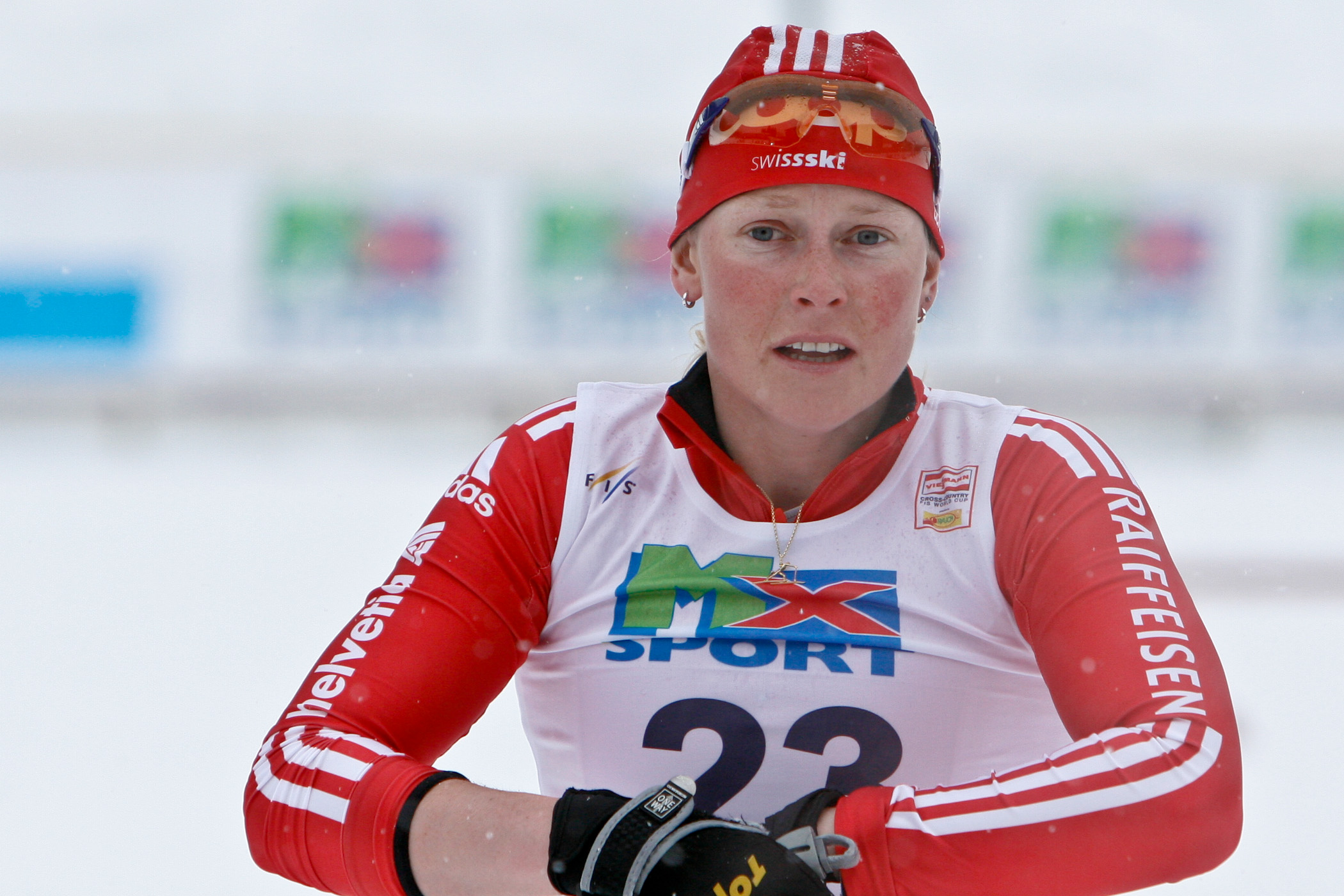
- Mischol in Trondheim, March 2009

Personal information
- Nationality: Switzerland
- Born: December 1, 1981 (age 44) Samedan, Switzerland

Sport
- Sport: Skiing
- Club: SC Davos

World Cup career
- Seasons: 11 – (2000, 2002–2011)
- Indiv. starts: 118
- Indiv. podiums: 0
- Team starts: 25
- Team podiums: 0
- Overall titles: 0 – (15th in 2008)
- Discipline titles: 0
Medal record
Women's cross-country skiing
Representing Switzerland
U23 World Championships
Gold medal – first place	2003 Valdidentro	15 km classical
Silver medal – second place	2002 Val di Fiemme	Individual sprint
Bronze medal – third place	2002 Val di Fiemme	10 km skiathlon
Junior World Championships
Bronze medal – third place	2001 Karpacz	15 km freestyle

Seraina Mischol (born 1 December 1981) is a Swiss cross-country skier, who competed between 1999 and 2011.

== Cross-country skiing results ==
All results are sourced from the International Ski Federation (FIS).

=== Olympic Games ===
Year	Age	10 km individual	15 km skiathlon	30 km mass start	Sprint	4 × 5 km relay	Team sprint
2006	24	15	—	—	32	11	—

=== World Championships ===
Year	Age	10 km	15 km	Pursuit	30 km	Sprint	4 × 5 km relay	Team sprint
2001	19	55	—	—	CNX^{[a]}	—	7	—N/a
2003	21	33	34	—	—	—	10	—N/a
2005	23	38	—N/a	—	DNS	11	33	8
2007	25	—	—N/a	—	—	14	9	14
2009	27	22	—N/a	DNF	—	37	—	—

a. ^{1} Cancelled due to extremely cold weather.

=== World Cup ===
==== Season standings ====
Season	Age	Discipline standings					Ski Tour standings		
Season	Age	Overall	Distance	Long Distance	Middle Distance	Sprint	Nordic Opening	Tour de Ski	World Cup Final
2000	18	NC	—N/a	—	—	NC	—N/a	—N/a	—N/a
2002	20	NC	—N/a	—N/a	—N/a	—	—N/a	—N/a	—N/a
2003	21	NC	—N/a	—N/a	—N/a	NC	—N/a	—N/a	—N/a
2004	22	75	79	—N/a	—N/a	49	—N/a	—N/a	—N/a
2005	23	37	41	—N/a	—N/a	23	—N/a	—N/a	—N/a
2006	24	45	49	—N/a	—N/a	26	—N/a	—N/a	—N/a
2007	25	40	37	—N/a	—N/a	33	—N/a	DNF	—N/a
2008	26	15	23	—N/a	—N/a	12	—N/a	12	12
2009	27	62	52	—N/a	—N/a	46	—N/a	DNF	—
2010	28	128	NC	—N/a	—N/a	94	—N/a	DNF	—
2011	29	NC	NC	—N/a	—N/a	NC	—	—	—
