= 2006 Nordic Junior World Ski Championships =

International skiing competition

FIS Nordic Junior and U23 World Ski Championships 2006
- Host city: Kranj, Slovenia
- Events: 20
- Opening: 30 January
- Closing: 5 February

The FIS Nordic Junior and U23 World Ski Championships 2006 took place in Kranj, Slovenia from 30 January to 5 February 2006. It was the 29th Junior World Championships. This was the first time that the Under-23 World Championships and the Junior World Champions were held at the same time and location.

This was the first championship where women competed in ski jumping. Juliane Seyfarth of Germany became the first female junior world champion by winning the normal hill event on 2 February 2006.

== Medal summary ==
=== Junior events ===
==== Cross-country skiing ====
Event	Gold		Silver		Bronze	
Men's Junior Events
Men's junior sprint free	Petter Northug; Norway		Daniel Heun; Germany		Anton Smirnov; Russia	
Men's junior 10 kilometre classic	Petter Northug; Norway	26:33.2	Martin Jakš; Czech Republic	26:58.4	Dario Cologna; Switzerland	27:53.6
Men's junior 20 kilometre pursuit	Petter Northug; Norway	51:34.3	Ilia Chernousov; Russia	51:39.6	Martin Jakš; Czech Republic	51:45.8
Men's junior 4 × 5 km relay	Norway; Glenn Elvestad; Eirik Kurland Olsen; Eirik Sæves; Petter Northug	47:15.7	Russia; Nikolay Morilov; Yuriy Vinogradov; Andrey Parfenov; Ilia Chernousov	47:30.5	Czech Republic; Aleš Razým; Jan Krska; Ondřej Horyna; Martin Jakš	47:31.4
Women's Junior Events
Women's junior sprint free	Astrid Jacobsen; Norway		Natalya Matveyeva; Russia		Celine Brun-Lie; Norway	
Women's junior 5 kilometre classic	Astrid Jacobsen; Norway	13:57.9	Eva Nývltová; Czech Republic	14:16.3	Charlotte Kalla; Sweden	14:30.6
Women's junior 10 kilometre pursuit	Charlotte Kalla; Sweden	29:12.2	Betty Ann Bjerkreim Nilsen; Norway	29:21.8	Eva Nývltová; Czech Republic	29:38.8
Women's junior 4 × 3.33 km relay	Norway; Ingunn Weltzien; Marit Liland Fredriksen; Marte Elden; Betty Ann Bjerkreim Nilsen	34:59.0	Sweden; Emma Bergman; Anna Simberg; Anna Hansson; Charlotte Kalla	35:04.2	Russia; Nina Ryusina; Larisa Shaidurova; Tatyana Morogova; Svetlana Ovchinnikova	35:14.6

==== Nordic Combined ====
Event	Gold		Silver		Bronze	
Normal hill/5 km	Tom Beetz; Germany	13:06.3	Akito Watabe; Japan	13:08.9	Miroslav Dvořák; Czech Republic	13:16.7
Normal hill/10 km	François Braud; France	29:59.9	Tom Beetz; Germany	30:47.6	Miroslav Dvořák; Czech Republic	30:50.0
Team normal hill/4 × 5 km	Germany; Toni Englert; Ruben Welde; Stefan Tuss; Tom Beetz	55:42.3	Austria; Tomaz Druml; Tobias Kammerlander; Marco Pichlmayer; Alfred Rainer	55:42.6	Norway; Jonas Nermoen; Joakim Aakvik; Torkil Rasmussen Aam; Thomas Kjelbotn	56:12.4

==== Ski jumping ====
Event	Gold		Silver		Bronze	
Men's Junior Events
Men's junior individual normal hill	Gregor Schlierenzauer; Austria	259.6	Jurij Tepeš; Slovenia	249.4	Andrea Morassi; Italy	247.4
Men's junior team normal hill	Austria; Arthur Pauli; Thomas Thurnbichler; Mario Innauer; Gregor Schlierenzauer	930.6	Slovenia; Jernej Košnjek; Primož Roglič; Jurij Tepeš; Robert Hrgota	927.7	Japan; Naoya Toyama; Yuhei Sasaki; Shohhei Tochimoto; Kenshiro Ito	900.8
Women's Junior Events
Women's junior individual normal hill	Juliane Seyfarth; Germany	255.8	Atsuko Tanaka; Canada	223.4	Elena Runggaldier; Italy	217.8

=== Under-23 events ===
==== Cross-country skiing ====
Event	Gold		Silver		Bronze	
Men's Under-23 Events
Men's Under-23 sprint free	Harald Wurm; Austria		Josef Wenzl; Germany		Marcus Hellner; Sweden	
Men's Under-23 15 kilometre classic	Franz Göring; Germany	38:23.9	Maxim Bulgakov; Russia	39:09.0	Alexander Legkov; Russia	39:19.5
Men's Under-23 30 kilometre pursuit	Alexander Legkov; Russia	1:17:19.7	Sergey Shiryayev; Russia	1:17:33.6	Franz Göring; Germany	1:17:35.6
Women's Under-23 Events
Women's Under-23 sprint free	Guro Strøm Solli; Norway		Valentina Novikova; Russia		Nicole Fessel; Germany	
Women's Under-23 10 kilometre classic	Justyna Kowalczyk; Poland	28:07.0	Irina Artemova; Russia	28:30.9	Yuliya Chekalyova; Russia	28:36.9
Women's Under-23 15 kilometre pursuit	Justyna Kowalczyk; Poland	44:14.7	Irina Artemova; Russia	44:41.2	Yuliya Chekalyova; Russia	44:54.5

=== Medal tables ===
==== All events ====
* Host nation (Slovenia)

Rank	Nation	Gold	Silver	Bronze	Total
1	Norway (NOR)	8	1	2	11
2	Germany (GER)	4	3	2	9
3	Austria (AUT)	3	1	0	4
4	Poland (POL)	2	0	0	2
5	Russia (RUS)	1	8	5	14
6	Sweden (SWE)	1	1	2	4
7	France (FRA)	1	0	0	1
8	Czech Republic (CZE)	0	2	5	7
9	Slovenia (SVN)*	0	2	0	2
10	Japan (JPN)	0	1	1	2
11	Canada (CAN)	0	1	0	1
12	Italy (ITA)	0	0	2	2
13	Switzerland (SUI)	0	0	1	1
Totals (13 entries)		20	20	20	60

==== Junior events ====
* Host nation (Slovenia)

Rank	Nation	Gold	Silver	Bronze	Total
1	Norway (NOR)	7	1	2	10
2	Germany (GER)	3	2	0	5
3	Austria (AUT)	2	1	0	3
4	Sweden (SWE)	1	1	1	3
5	France (FRA)	1	0	0	1
6	Russia (RUS)	0	3	2	5
7	Czech Republic (CZE)	0	2	5	7
8	Slovenia (SVN)*	0	2	0	2
9	Japan (JPN)	0	1	1	2
10	Canada (CAN)	0	1	0	1
11	Italy (ITA)	0	0	2	2
12	Switzerland (SUI)	0	0	1	1
Totals (12 entries)		14	14	14	42

==== Under-23 events ====
* Host nation (Slovenia)

Rank	Nation	Gold	Silver	Bronze	Total
1	Poland (POL)	2	0	0	2
2	Russia (RUS)	1	5	3	9
3	Germany (GER)	1	1	2	4
4	Austria (AUT)	1	0	0	1
4	Norway (NOR)	1	0	0	1
6	Sweden (SWE)	0	0	1	1
Totals (6 entries)		6	6	6	18
