= 2007 Nordic Junior World Ski Championships =

International skiing competition

FIS Nordic Junior and U23 World Ski Championships 2007
- Host city: Planica, Slovenia; Tarvisio, Italy
- Events: 20
- Opening: 12 March
- Closing: 18 March

The FIS Nordic Junior and U23 World Ski Championships 2007 took place in Planica, Slovenia and Tarvisio, Italy from 12 March to 18 March 2007. It was the 30th Junior World Championships and the second Under-23 World Championships in Nordic skiing. Cross-country skiing and Nordic combined events were held in Tarvisio, while the ski jumping events were held in Planica.

== Medal summary ==
=== Junior events ===
==== Cross-country skiing ====
Event	Gold		Silver		Bronze	
Men's Junior Events
Men's junior sprint classic	Ivan Ivanov; Russia		Martti Jylhä; Finland		Eirik Sæves; Norway	
Men's junior 10 kilometre free	Martti Jylhä; Finland	22:40.9	Alexey Poltoranin; Kazakhstan	22:57.3	Alex Harvey; Canada	23:11.4
Men's junior 20 kilometre pursuit	Eirik Kurland Olsen; Norway	52:49.8	Sjur Røthe; Norway	52:53.3	Alex Harvey; Canada	52:54.5
Men's junior 4 × 5 km relay	Sweden; Jesper Modin; Patrik Karlsson; Magnus Engström; Adam Johansson	49.18,4	Russia; Ivan Ivanov; Dmitry Vasiliev; Evgeniy Garanichev; Andrey Parfenov	49.18,4	Austria; Markus Bader; Michael Reiter; Felizian Herburger; Johannes Dürr	49.22,6
Ladies' Junior Events
Ladies' junior sprint classic	Astrid Jacobsen; Norway		Charlotte Kalla; Sweden		Denise Herrmann; Germany	
Ladies' junior 5 kilometre free	Charlotte Kalla; Sweden	11:44.5	Marthe Kristoffersen; Norway	12:15.2	Astrid Jacobsen; Norway	12:19.2
Ladies' junior 10 kilometre pursuit	Charlotte Kalla; Sweden	26:10.9	Marte Monrad-Hansen; Norway	26:51.7	Therese Johaug; Norway	26:52.6
Ladies' junior 4 × 3.33 km relay	Norway; Celine Brun-Lie; Therese Johaug; Marte Monrad-Hansen; Astrid Jacobsen	34:09.4	Sweden; Mia Eriksson; Eva Svensson; Anna Simberg; Charlotte Kalla	34:12.0	Finland; Satu Annila; Kerttu Niskanen; Anne Kyllönen; Mari Laukkanen	34:56.2

==== Nordic Combined ====
Event	Gold		Silver		Bronze	
Normal hill/5 km	Eric Frenzel; Germany	15:13.3	Anssi Koivuranta; Finland	15:39.5	Alfred Rainer; Austria	15:47.1
Normal hill/10 km	Anssi Koivuranta; Finland	33:26.7	Marco Pichlmayer; Austria	33:43.1	Alfred Rainer; Austria	34:05.2
Team normal hill/4 × 5 km	Austria; Marco Pichlmayer; Johannes Weiss; Tomaz Druml; Alfred Rainer	1:05:35.0	Germany; Sebastian Reuschel; Stefan Tuss; Ruben Welde; Eric Frenzel	1:05:40.1	Norway; Magnus Krog; Ole Martin Storlien; Glenn Arne Sollid; Peder Blaauw Sandell	1:07:04.0

==== Ski jumping ====
Event	Gold		Silver		Bronze	
Men's Junior Events
Men's junior individual normal hill	Roman Koudelka; Czech Republic	268.0	Shohhei Tochimoto; Japan	256.5	Thomas Thurnbichler; Austria	254.5
Men's junior team normal hill	Slovenia; Robert Hrgota; Primož Roglič; Jurij Tepeš; Mitja Mežnar	981.0	Japan; Shohhei Tochimoto; Tsubasa Chonan; Yumu Harada; Kenshiro Ito	945.5	Finland; Mika Kauhanen; Lauri Asikainen; Sami Niemi; Olli Muotka	937.5
Ladies' Junior Events
Ladies' junior individual normal hill	Lisa Demetz; Italy	229.5	Katie Willis; Canada	228.0	Maja Vtič; Slovenia	227.0

=== Under-23 events ===
==== Cross-country skiing ====
Event	Gold		Silver		Bronze	
Men's Under-23 Events
Men's under-23 sprint classic	Robin Bryntesson; Sweden		Marcus Hellner; Sweden		Matias Strandvall; Finland	
Men's under-23 15 kilometre free	Dario Cologna; Switzerland	34:57.0	Ilia Chernousov; Russia	35:44.2	Nobu Naruse; Japan	35:46.7
Men's under-23 30 kilometre pursuit	Dario Cologna; Switzerland	1:21:50.4	Curdin Perl; Switzerland	1:21:52.0	Stanislav Volzhentsev; Russia	1:21:52.0
Ladies' Under-23 Events
Ladies' under-23 sprint classic	Alena Procházková; Slovakia		Laura Valaas; United States		Piret Pormeister; Estonia	
Ladies' under-23 10 kilometre free	Silvana Bucher; Switzerland	24:28.1	Sofia Bleckur; Sweden	24:47.7	Marina Piller; Italy	24:49.0
Ladies' under-23 15 kilometre pursuit	Yuliya Chekalyova; Russia	41:53.8	Coraline Hugue; France	42:00.2	Ivana Janečková; Czech Republic	42:08.8

=== Medal tables ===
==== All events ====
Rank	Nation	Gold	Silver	Bronze	Total
1	Sweden (SWE)	4	4	0	8
2	Norway (NOR)	3	3	4	10
3	Switzerland (SUI)	3	1	0	4
4	Russia (RUS)	2	3	0	5
5	Finland (FIN)	2	2	3	7
6	Austria (AUT)	1	1	4	6
7	Germany (GER)	1	1	1	3
8	Czech Republic (CZE)	1	0	1	2
8	Italy (ITA)	1	0	1	2
8	Slovenia (SLO)	1	0	1	2
11	Slovakia (SVK)	1	0	0	1
12	Japan (JPN)	0	2	1	3
13	Canada (CAN)	0	1	2	3
14	France (FRA)	0	1	0	1
14	Kazakhstan (KAZ)	0	1	0	1
14	United States (USA)	0	1	0	1
17	Estonia (EST)	0	0	1	1
Totals (17 entries)		20	21	19	60

==== Junior events ====
Rank	Nation	Gold	Silver	Bronze	Total
1	Norway (NOR)	3	3	4	10
2	Finland (FIN)	2	2	2	6
3	Sweden (SWE)	2	2	0	4
4	Russia (RUS)	2	0	0	2
5	Germany (GER)	1	2	1	4
6	Austria (AUT)	1	1	3	5
7	Slovenia (SLO)	1	0	1	2
8	Czech Republic (CZE)	1	0	0	1
8	Italy (ITA)	1	0	0	1
10	Japan (JPN)	0	2	0	2
11	Canada (CAN)	0	1	2	3
12	Kazakhstan (KAZ)	0	1	1	2
Totals (12 entries)		14	14	14	42

==== Under-23 events ====
* Host nation (Italy)

Rank	Nation	Gold	Silver	Bronze	Total
1	Switzerland (SUI)	3	1	0	4
2	Sweden (SWE)	1	2	0	3
3	Russia (RUS)	1	1	1	3
4	Slovakia (SVK)	1	0	0	1
5	France (FRA)	0	1	0	1
5	United States (USA)	0	1	0	1
7	Czech Republic (CZE)	0	0	1	1
7	Estonia (EST)	0	0	1	1
7	Finland (FIN)	0	0	1	1
7	Italy (ITA)*	0	0	1	1
7	Japan (JPN)	0	0	1	1
Totals (11 entries)		6	6	6	18
