= Mateusz Rutkowski =

Polish ski jumper (1986–2024)

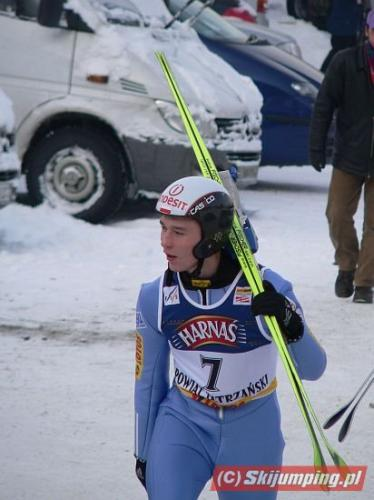
- Rutkowski in 2005

Personal information
- Nationality: Poland
- Born: 18 April 1986 Skrzypne, Poland
- Died: 7 January 2024 (aged 37) Skrzypne, Poland
- Height: 1.70 m (5 ft 7 in)

Sport
- Sport: Skiing
- Club: LKS Poroniec Poronin

World Cup career
- Seasons: 2004–2005
- Indiv. podiums: 0
- Indiv. wins: 0

Achievements and titles
- Personal bests: 201.5 m (Planica, 2004)
Medal record
Men's ski jumping
Representing Poland
World Junior Championship
Gold medal – first place	2004 Stryn	Individual NH
Silver medal – second place	2004 Stryn	Team NH
- Updated on 26 February 2014

Mateusz Rutkowski (18 April 1986 − 7 January 2024) was a Polish ski jumper. He won an individual gold medal and a team silver medal at the 2004 World Junior Championships.

== Personal life ==
Mateusz Rutkowski was born in Skrzypne, Poland. He had a younger brother Łukasz, who is also a ski jumper. Mateusz was considered the most talented Polish ski jumper and Adam Małysz's successor.

In 2017, together with his brother Łukasz, he founded the Rutkow-Ski Sports Club dedicated to training children and youth.

Mateusz Rutkowski died on 7 January 2024, at the age of 37 due to sudden cardiac arrest.

== Career ==
Rutkowski competed at the 2002 and 2003 Junior World Championships, placing lowly. On 7 February 2004, he won the gold medal at the World Junior Championships, the first Pole in history to do so. During the competition he set a hill record (104.5 m) of Bjørkelibakken in Stryn Municipality, Norway.

Rutkowski was also allowed to make his debut in the FIS Ski Jumping World Cup in January 2004, starting out by finishing 37th in Liberec. On the next day, he collected his first World Cup point when finishing 30h in the same hill. The next week, he managed to improve to a 15th place in Zakopane. He was given a berth on the Polish team for the FIS Ski Flying World Championships 2004, finishing 28th individually and 8th in the team competition.

Rutkowski competed in one additional World Cup season, the 2004-05 FIS Ski Jumping World Cup circuit. Individually, he only managed to record placements between 32nd and 49th in Ruka, Titisee-Neustadt, Zakopane, and Pragelato. His last World Cup outing resulted in a 4th place in the team competition at Pragelato in February 2005. Later in February 2005, Rutkowski competed in three events at the FIS Nordic World Ski Championships 2005. He failed to make the cut with a 45th place in the normal hill and 39th place in the large hill, and lastly finished 9th in the team competition.

As the third Pole in history to do so, he surpassed the length of 200 metres during the Ski-Flying World Championships at Letalnica in Planica.

After his problems with alcohol, weight, and lack of discipline, he was kicked out of the Polish national ski jumping team after the 2004–05 season. Later, he trained only at his club Wisła Zakopane.
