= Khazov =

Khazov (Russian: Хазов) is a Russian masculine surname, its feminine counterpart is Khazova. Notable people with the surname include:

- Anton Khazov (born 1979), Russian football player
- Irina Khazova (born 1984), Russian cross-country skier
