= 2004 Nordic Junior World Ski Championships =

International skiing competition

FIS Nordic Junior World Ski Championships 2004
- Host city: Stryn, Norway
- Events: 13
- Opening: 3 February
- Closing: 8 February

The FIS Nordic Junior World Ski Championships 2004 took place in Stryn Municipality, Norway from 3 February to 8 February 2004. It was the 27th Junior World Championships in Nordic skiing.

== Schedule ==
All times are in Central European Time (CET).

Cross-country

Date	Time	Event
3 February	10:00	Women's 15 km classic mass start
3 February	11:30	Men's 30 km classic mass start
5 February	10:00	Women's 5 km free
5 February	11:30	Men's 10 km free
7 February	11:00	Men's sprint Women's sprint
8 February	09:30	Women's 4×5 km relay
8 February	11:00	Men's 4×10 km relay

Nordic combined

Date	Time	Event
4 February	15:30	HS100 / 10 km
7 February	10:00	Team 4×5 km Mass Start / HS100
8 February	13:30	Sprint HS100 / 5 km

Ski jumping

Date	Time	Event
5 February	17:00	Team HS100
7 February	16:00	Individual HS100

== Medal summary ==
=== Junior events ===
==== Cross-country skiing ====
Event	Gold		Silver		Bronze	
Men's Junior Events
Men's sprint free	Robin Bryntesson; Sweden		Ville Verkama; Finland		Martin Stockinger; Austria	
Men's 10 kilometre free	Franz Göring; Germany	24:19.2	Yevgeniy Koshevoy; Kazakhstan	+3.0	Nikolay Morilov; Russia	+26.6
Men's 30 kilometre classic mass start	Anatoly Neuchesov; Russia	1:24:32.7	Curdin Perl; Switzerland	+11.6	Franz Göring; Germany	+1:21.8
Men's 4 × 10 km relay	Kazakhstan; Sergey Cherepanov; Alexey Poltoranin; Yevgeniy Safonov; Yevgeniy Koshevoy	1:44:09.8	Germany; Steve Ullmann; Stefan Kirchner; Franz Göring; Erik Hänel	+1.9	Russia; Vyacheslav Dvoskin; Anatoly Neuchesov; Alexander Parusov; Nikolay Morilov	+1:19.6
Ladies' Junior Events
Ladies' sprint free	Astrid Øvstedal; Norway		Ida Ingemarsdotter; Sweden		Valentina Novikova; Russia	
Ladies' 5 kilometre free	Irina Artemova; Russia	13:03.7	Anna Slepova; Russia	+13.5	Valentina Novikova; Russia	+16.8
Ladies' 15 kilometre classic mass start	Irina Artemova; Russia	46:12.6	Antje Dittrich; Germany	+10.8	Marion Ruf; Germany	+15.7
Ladies' 4 × 5 km relay	Russia; Valentina Novikova; Anna Slepova; Natalya Iliana; Irina Artemova	58:44.3	Czech Republic; Eva Nývltová; Lenka Munclingerová; Petra Markelová; Ivana Janečková	+ 21.5	Germany; Antje Dittrich; Nadine Bachmann; Julia Swieder; Marion Ruf	+1:43.3

==== Nordic Combined ====
Event	Gold		Silver		Bronze	
Normal hill/5 km	Petter Tande; Norway	14:02.1	Tino Edelmann; Germany	+35.9	Anssi Koivuranta; Finland	+43.5
Normal hill/10 km	Petter Tande; Norway	26:06.3	Tino Edelmann; Germany	+2:30.7	David Zauner; Austria	+2:54.6
Team 4 × 5 km/normal hill	Norway; Einar Uvsløkk; Mikko Kokslien; Jon-Richard Rundsveen; Petter Tande	794.0	Germany; Christian Ulmer; Christian Beetz; Florian Schillinger; Tino Edelmann	769.7	Austria; Michael Palli; Lukas Klapfer; Benjamin Kreiner; David Zauner	757.0

==== Ski jumping ====
Event	Gold		Silver		Bronze	
Individual normal hill	Mateusz Rutkowski; Poland	273.5	Thomas Morgenstern; Austria	261.0	Olli Pekkala; Finland	248.0
Team normal hill	Austria; Roland Müller; Christoph Lenz; Nicolas Fettner; Thomas Morgenstern	955.0	Poland; Kamil Stoch; Dawid Kowal; Stefan Hula; Mateusz Rutkowski	904.5	Germany; Patrick Kaltenbach; Tobias Bogner; Marc Krauspenhaar; Julian Musiol	901.5

=== Medal table ===
* Host nation (Norway)

Rank	Nation	Gold	Silver	Bronze	Total
1	Russia (RUS)	4	1	4	9
2	Norway (NOR)*	4	0	0	4
3	Germany (GER)	1	5	4	10
4	Austria (AUT)	1	1	3	5
5	Kazakhstan (KAZ)	1	1	0	2
5	Poland (POL)	1	1	0	2
5	Sweden (SWE)	1	1	0	2
8	Finland (FIN)	0	1	2	3
9	Czech Republic (CZE)	0	1	0	1
9	Switzerland (SUI)	0	1	0	1
Totals (10 entries)		13	13	13	39
