= Kammerlander =

Kammerlander is an Austrian surname that may refer to

- Gerald Kammerlander (born 1981), Austrian luger
- Hans Kammerlander (born 1956), Italian mountaineer
  - 185321 Kammerlander, a minor planet named after Hans
- Simon Breitfuss Kammerlander (born 1992), Bolivian-Austrian alpine skier
- Thomas Kammerlander (born 1990), Austrian luger, brother of Gerald
- Tobias Kammerlander (born 1986), Austrian Nordic combined skier
