= Stefan Tuss =

German Nordic combined skier

Stefan Tuss (born 1988) is a retired German Nordic combined skier.

He competed at the 2006, 2007 and 2008 Junior World Championships. He won two gold medals in the team competitions of 2006 and 2008, and a team silver in 2007. His best individual placement was 5th in 2008.

He made his World Cup debut in December 2006 in Lillehammer, finishing 33rd. He collected his first World Cup points when finishing 15th in December 2007 in Trondheim. This remained his only top-20 placement. His last World Cup outing came in February 2009 in Klingenthal.

He made his Continental Cup debut in December 2008 in Park City and recorded his only podium in January 2009 in Eisenerz. His last Continental Cup outing came in February 2011 in Szczyrk.

He represented the sports club SK Winterberg.
