= Zaskale, Lesser Poland Voivodeship =

Zaskale
- Village
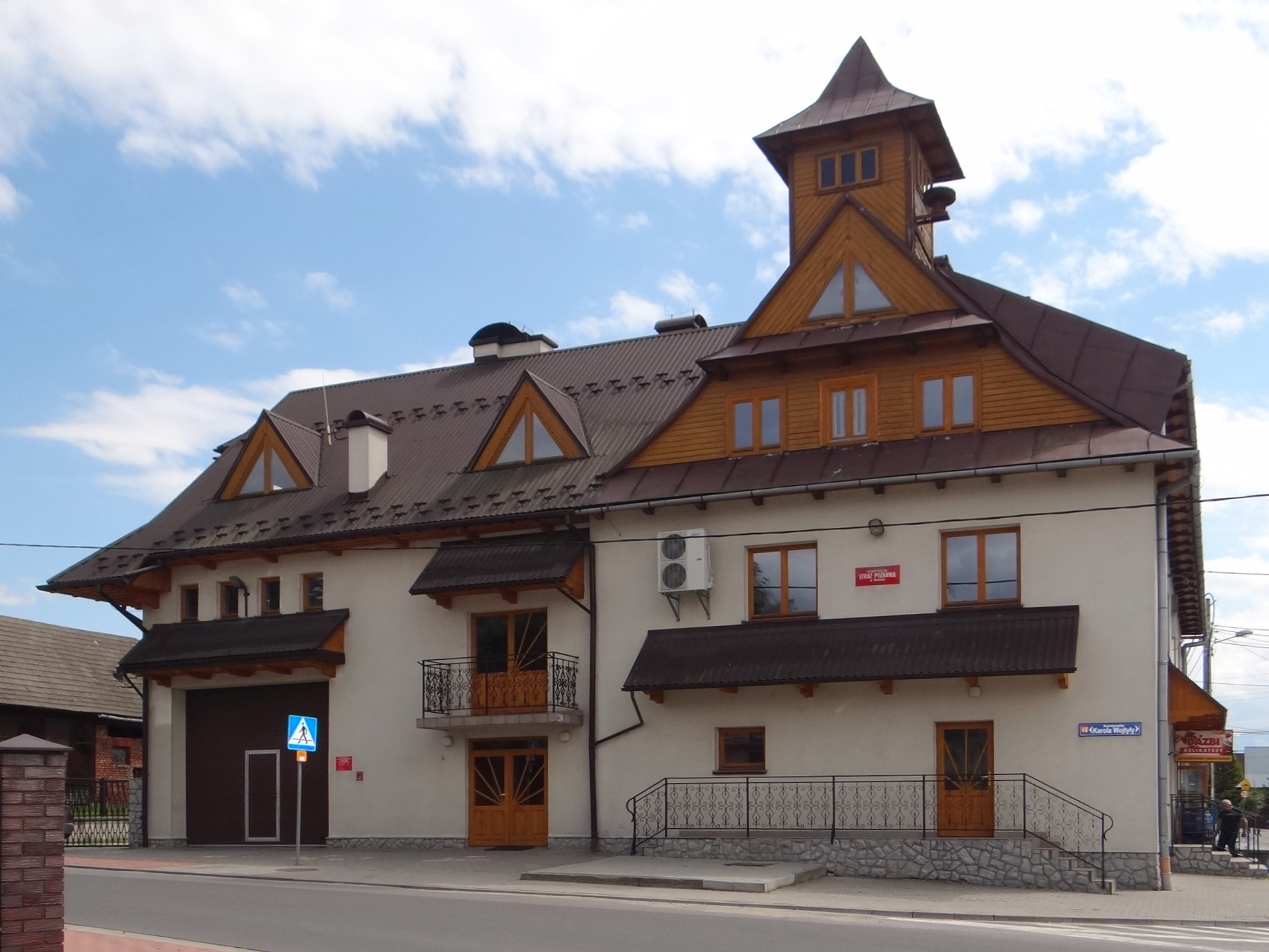
- Fire station

- Location within Poland
- Coordinates: 49°27′N 19°59′E
- Country: Poland
- Voivodeship: Lesser Poland
- County: Nowy Targ
- Gmina: Szaflary

Zaskale [zasˈkalɛ] is a village in the administrative district of Gmina Szaflary, within Nowy Targ County, Lesser Poland Voivodeship, in southern Poland.
