= Bańska Niżna =

- Village
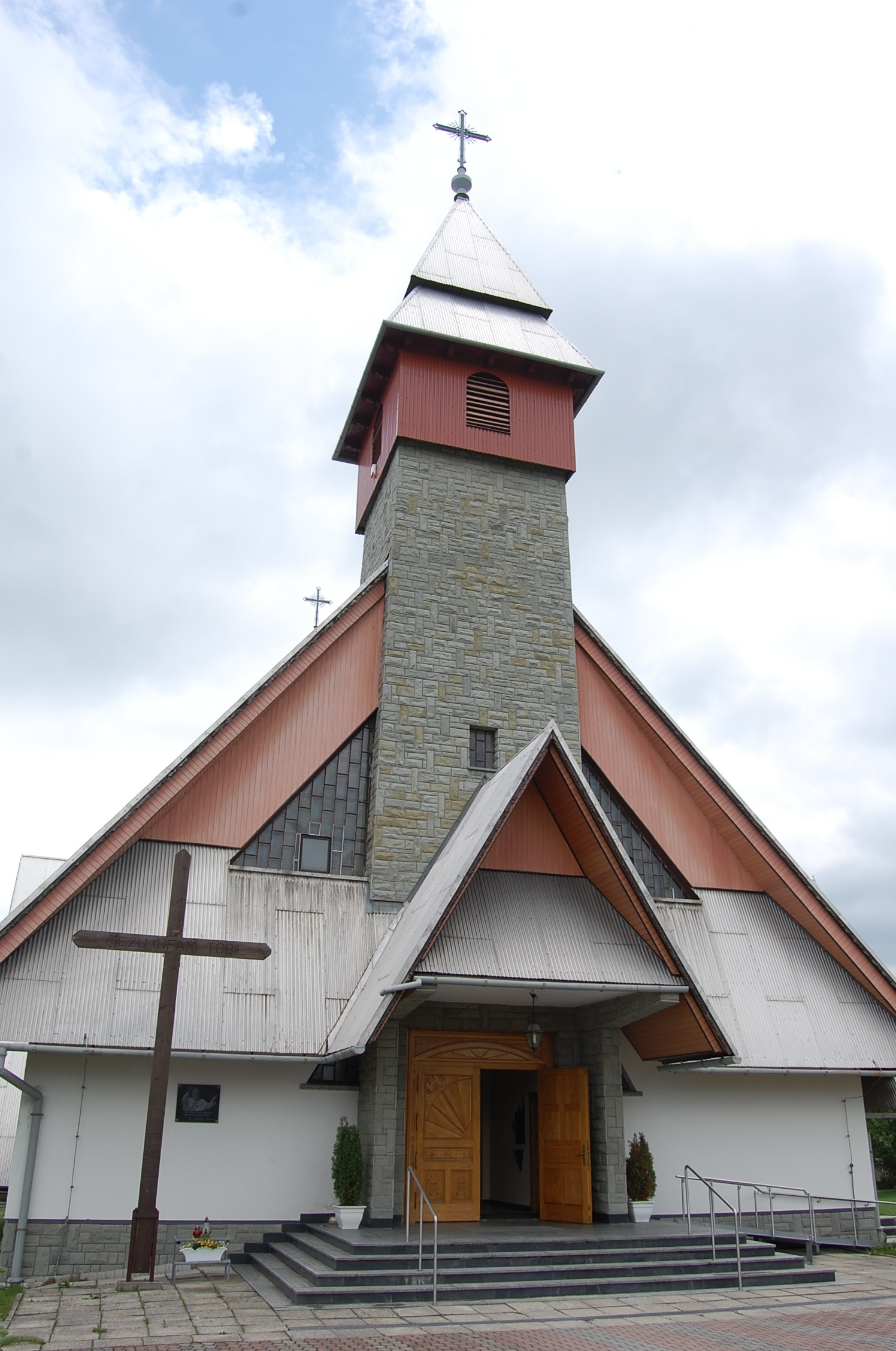
- Divine Mercy church in Bańska Niżna

- Location within Poland
- Coordinates: 49°24′N 20°1′E
- Country: Poland
- Voivodeship: Lesser Poland
- County: Nowy Targ
- Gmina: Szaflary
- Elevation: 700 m (2,300 ft)
- Population: 1,000
- Website: https://banska-nizna.pl/

Bańska Niżna [ˈbaɲska ˈniʐna] is a village in the administrative district of Gmina Szaflary, within Nowy Targ County, Lesser Poland Voivodeship, in southern Poland.
