= Cécile Storti =

French cross-country skier (born 1983)

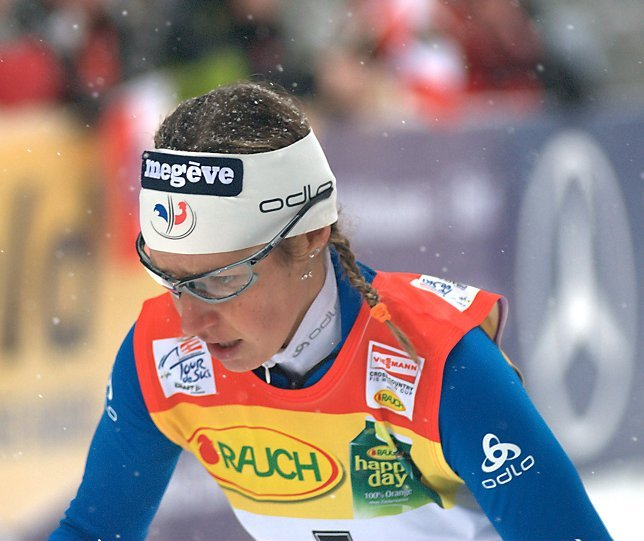
- Storti in 2010

Personal information
- Nationality: France
- Born: April 5, 1983 (age 43) Évian-les-Bains, France

Sport
- Sport: Skiing

World Cup career
- Seasons: 7 – (2004–2010)
- Indiv. starts: 29
- Indiv. podiums: 0
- Team starts: 10
- Team podiums: 0
- Overall titles: 0 – (77th in 2010)
- Discipline titles: 0
Medal record
Women's cross-country skiing
Representing France
Junior World Championships
Silver medal – second place	2002 Schonach	5 km freestyle

Cécile Storti (born April 5, 1983 in Évian-les-Bains) is a French cross-country skier who has competed since 2000. Competing in two Winter Olympics, she earned her best finish of sixth in the 4 × 5 km relay at Vancouver in 2010.

Storti's best finish at the FIS Nordic World Ski Championships was ninth in the 4 × 5 km relay at Oberstdorf in 2005.

Her best World Cup finish was fifth at a 4 × 5 km relay in Italy in 2006 while her best individual finish was 19th at a 7.5 km + 7.5 km double pursuit event in Canada in 2009.

== Cross-country skiing results ==
All results are sourced from the International Ski Federation (FIS).

=== Olympic Games ===
Year	Age	10 km individual	15 km skiathlon	30 km mass start	Sprint	4 × 5 km relay	Team sprint
2006	22	—	—	—	—	9	—
2010	26	—	44	DNF	—	6	—

=== World Championships ===
Year	Age	10 km individual	15 km skiathlon	30 km mass start	Sprint	4 × 5 km relay	Team sprint
2005	21	30	—	—	—	9	—
2009	25	—	42	DNF	—	—	—

=== World Cup ===
==== Season standings ====
Season	Age	Discipline standings			Ski Tour standings	
Season	Age	Overall	Distance	Sprint	Tour de Ski	World Cup Final
2004	20	NC	NC	—	—N/a	—N/a
2005	21	NC	NC	—	—N/a	—N/a
2006	22	85	61	—	—N/a	—N/a
2007	23	NC	NC	NC	DNF	—N/a
2008	24	NC	NC	—	—	—
2009	25	84	55	—	—	—
2010	26	77	55	NC	32	—
