= Franz Göring =

German cross-country skier (born 1984)

Personal information
- Nationality: Germany
- Born: 22 October 1984 (age 41) Suhl, East Germany

Sport
- Sport: Skiing
- Club: SC Motor Zella-Mehlis

World Cup career
- Seasons: 11 – (2003–2009, 2011–2014)
- Indiv. starts: 93
- Indiv. podiums: 3
- Indiv. wins: 1
- Team starts: 12
- Team podiums: 3
- Team wins: 2
- Overall titles: 0 – (14th in 2007)
- Discipline titles: 0
Medal record
Representing Germany
Men's cross-country skiing
World Championships
Silver medal – second place	2009 Liberec	4 × 10 km relay
Bronze medal – third place	2011 Oslo	4 × 10 km relay
U23 World Championships
Gold medal – first place	2005 Oberstdorf	20 km skiathlon
Gold medal – first place	2005 Oberstdorf	15 km freestyle
Gold medal – first place	2006 Kranj	15 km classical
Bronze medal – third place	2006 Kranj	20 km skiathlon
Junior World Championships
Gold medal – first place	2004 Stryn	10 km freestyle
Silver medal – second place	2004 Stryn	4 × 10 km relay
Bronze medal – third place	2003 Sollefteå	4 × 10 km relay
Bronze medal – third place	2004 Stryn	30 km classical

Franz Göring (born 22 October 1984) is a German cross-country skier who has been competing since 2002. He won a silver medal in the 4 × 10 km event at the FIS Nordic World Ski Championships 2009 in Liberec and had his best individual finish of sixth in the 15 km at the 2007 championships in Sapporo.

Göring also finished 44th in the 15 km event at the 2006 Winter Olympics in Turin.

He has eight overall individual victories at various levels at various distances up to 15 km since 2002.

== Cross-country skiing results ==
All results are sourced from the International Ski Federation (FIS).

=== Olympic Games ===
Year	Age	15 km individual	30 km skiathlon	50 km mass start	Sprint	4 × 10 km relay	Team sprint
2006	21	43	—	—	—	—	—

=== World Championships ===
- 2 medals – (1 silver, 1 bronze)

Year	Age	15 km individual	30 km skiathlon	50 km mass start	Sprint	4 × 10 km relay	Team sprint
2005	20	13	—	39	20	—	—
2007	22	6	—	—	—	4	—
2009	24	11	—	—	19	Silver	—
2011	26	—	11	27	—	Bronze	—

=== World Cup ===
==== Season standings ====
Season	Age	Discipline standings			Ski Tour standings		
Season	Age	Overall	Distance	Sprint	Nordic Opening	Tour de Ski	World Cup Final
2003	18	NC	—N/a	—	—N/a	—N/a	—N/a
2004	19	131	92	—	—N/a	—N/a	—N/a
2005	20	53	31	NC	—N/a	—N/a	—N/a
2006	21	83	57	NC	—N/a	—N/a	—N/a
2007	22	14	17	NC	—N/a	6	—N/a
2008	23	22	32	59	—N/a	6	—
2009	24	76	76	52	—N/a	—	—
2011	26	74	43	NC	DNF	DNF	—
2012	27	102	66	101	DNF	DNF	—
2013	28	152	NC	94	—	DNF	—
2014	29	NC	NC	NC	—	DNF	—

==== Individual podiums ====
- 1 victory – (1 SWC)
- 3 podiums – (1 WC, 2 SWC)

No.	Season	Date	Location	Race	Level	Place
1	2006–07	18 November 2006	Gällivare, Sweden	15 km Individual F	World Cup	3rd
2	2006–07	3 January 2007	Oberstdorf, Germany	15 km Individual C	Stage World Cup	1st
3	2007–08	5 January 2008	Val di Fiemme, Italy	20 km Mass Start C	Stage World Cup	3rd

==== Team podiums ====
- 2 victories – (2 RL)
- 3 podiums – (3 RL)

No.	Season	Date	Location	Race	Level	Place	Teammates
1	2003–04	22 February 2004	Umeå, Sweden	4 × 10 km Relay C/F	World Cup	1st	Schlütter / Filbrich / Teichmann
2	2006–07	19 November 2006	Gällivare, Sweden	4 × 10 km Relay C/F	World Cup	1st	Angerer / Filbrich / Teichmann
3	2010–11	6 February 2011	Rybinsk, Russia	4 × 10 km Relay C/F	World Cup	3rd	Kühne / Reichelt / Angerer
