= Maruszyna =

- Village
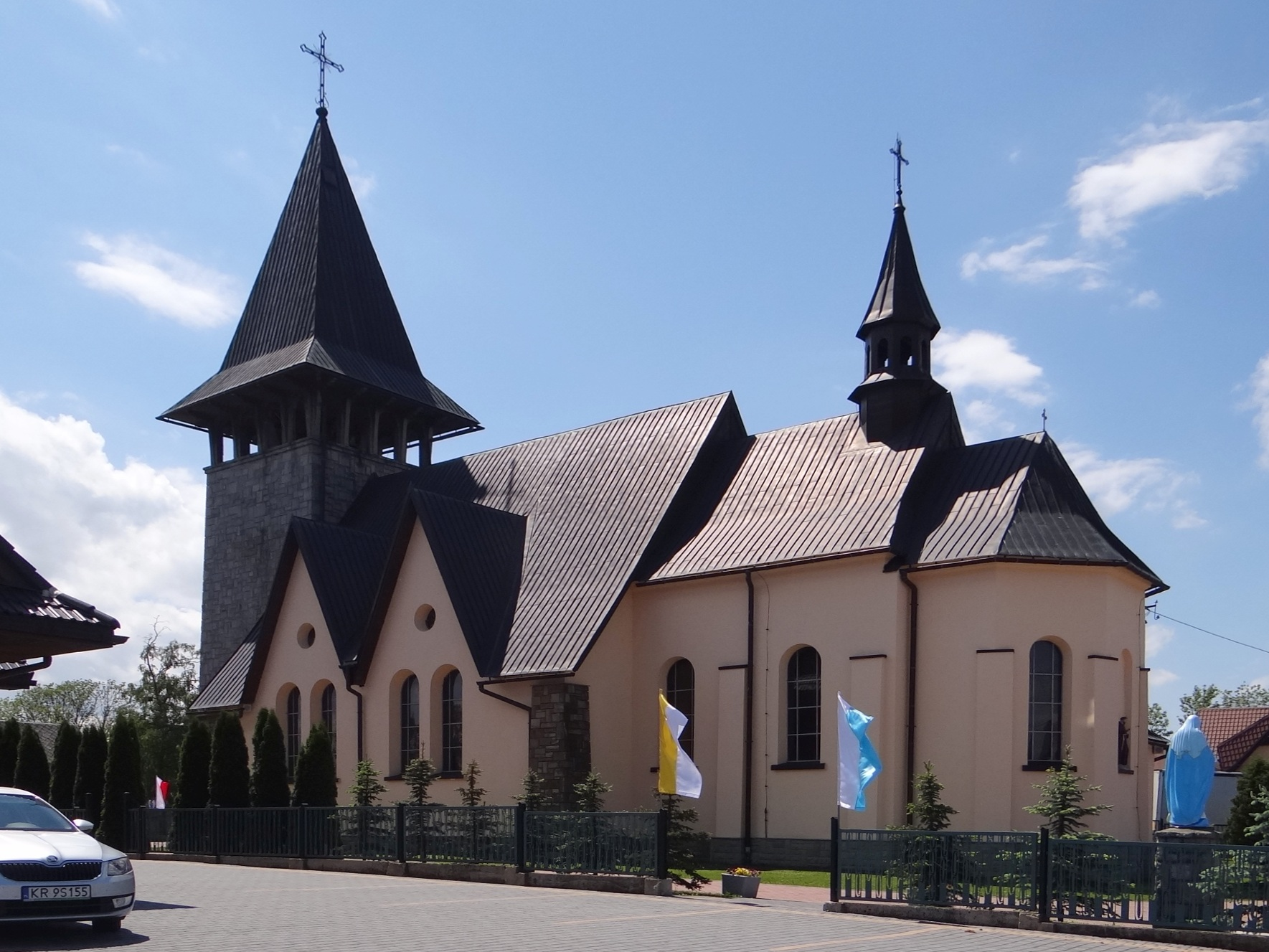
- Church of the Transfiguration

- Location within Poland
- Coordinates: 49°25′9″N 19°57′38″E
- Country: Poland
- Voivodeship: Lesser Poland
- County: Nowy Targ
- Gmina: Szaflary

Maruszyna [maruˈʂɨna] is a village in the administrative district of Gmina Szaflary, within Nowy Targ County, Lesser Poland Voivodeship, in southern Poland.
