= Bańska Wyżna =

- Village
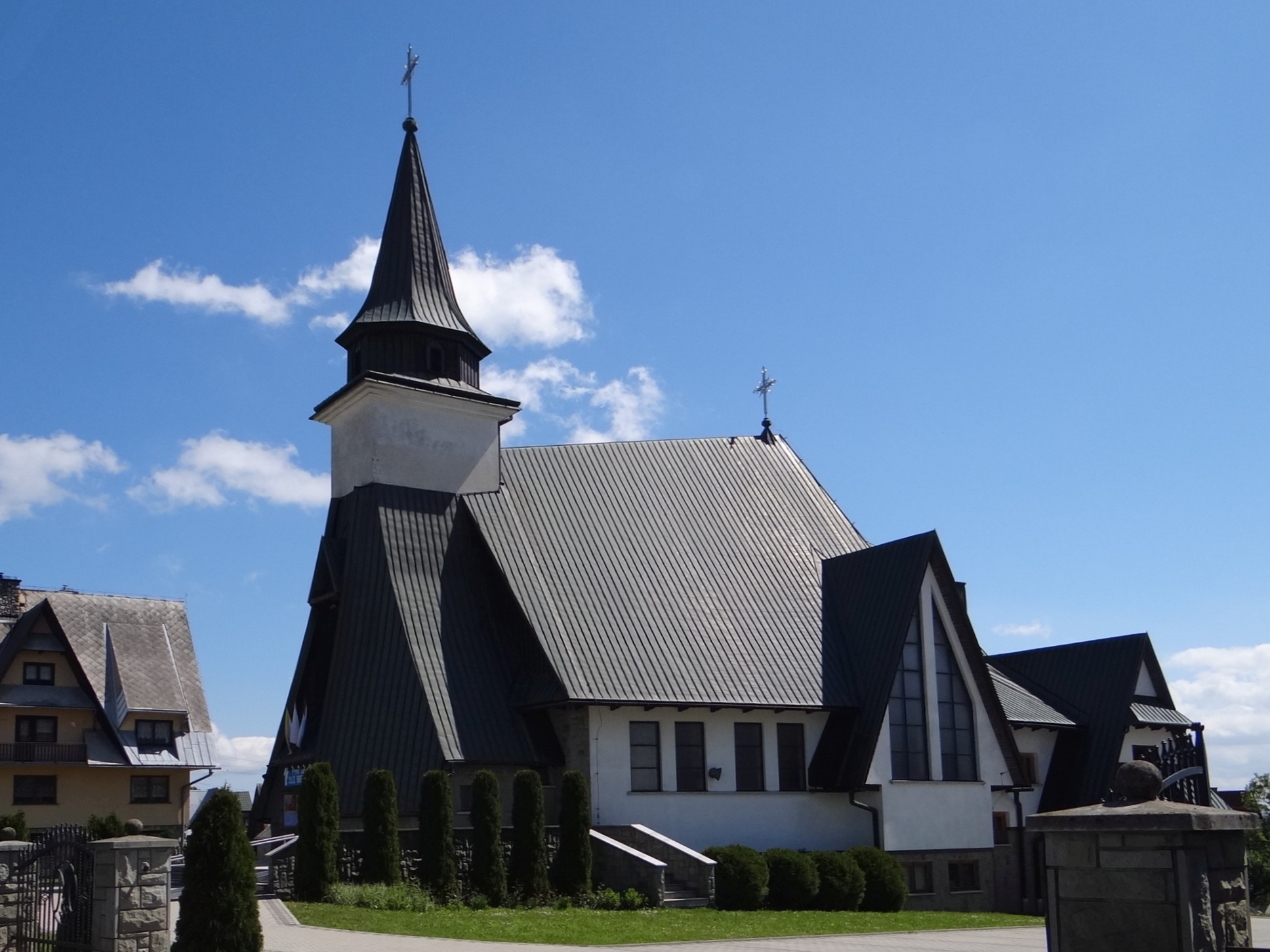
- Church of Our Lady of Fatima

- Location within Poland
- Coordinates: 49°24′N 19°59′E
- Country: Poland
- Voivodeship: Lesser Poland
- County: Nowy Targ
- Gmina: Szaflary
- Elevation: 900 m (3,000 ft)

Population
  - Total: 600
- Website: https://banska-wyzna.pl/en/

Bańska Wyżna [ˈbaɲska ˈvɨʐna] is a village in the administrative district of Gmina Szaflary, within Nowy Targ County, Lesser Poland Voivodeship, in southern Poland.
