= Alexey Petukhov =

Russian cross-country skier

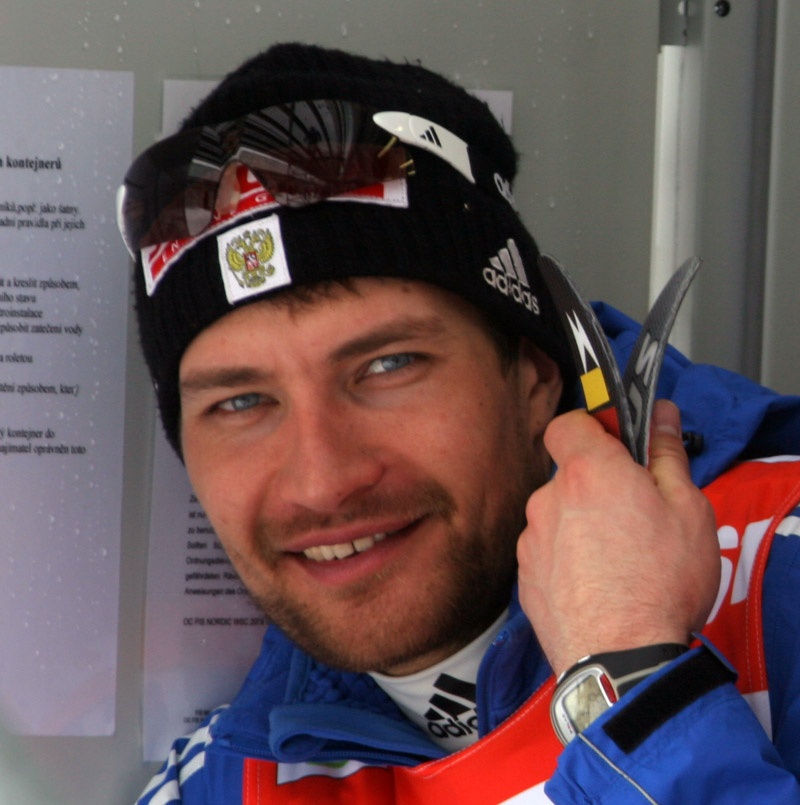
- Petukhov in 2009

Personal information
- Nationality: Russia
- Born: 28 June 1983 (age 43) Klintsy, Soviet Union

Sport
- Sport: Skiing

World Cup career
- Seasons: 14 – (2003–2004, 2008–2019)
- Indiv. starts: 85
- Indiv. podiums: 17
- Indiv. wins: 3
- Team starts: 14
- Team podiums: 8
- Team wins: 4
- Overall titles: 0 – (18th in 2010)
- Discipline titles: 0
Medal record
Men's cross-country skiing
Representing Russia
Olympic Games
Bronze medal – third place	2010 Vancouver	Team sprint
World Championships
Gold medal – first place	2013 Val di Flemme	Team sprint
Silver medal – second place	2015 Falun	Team sprint
Junior World Championships
Gold medal – first place	2003 Sollefteå	4 × 10 km relay
Silver medal – second place	2003 Sollefteå	30 km freestyle

Alexey Yevgenyevich Petukhov (Russian: Алексей Евгеньевич Петухов; born 28 June 1983) is a Russian cross-country skier who competed between 2002 and 2019.

== Career ==
His best World Cup finishes were two second places, both in sprint events in 2009, until December 2011, when he won a skate sprint in Davos, Switzerland. Petukhov finished ninth in the sprint event at the FIS Nordic World Ski Championships 2009 in Liberec. He won bronze with Nikolay Morilov in the Team Sprint at the 2010 Winter Olympics in Vancouver. In December 2016, FIS provisionally suspended six Russian cross-country skiers linked to doping violations during the 2014 Winter Olympics, including Petukhov. On 9 November 2017, he was officially disqualified from the 2014 Winter Olympics by the International Olympic Committee.

Petukhov also won the gold in the 4 x 10 km relay at the 2003 Nordic Junior World Ski Championships at Sollefteå.

== Cross-country skiing results ==
All results are sourced from the International Ski Federation (FIS).

=== Olympic Games ===
- 1 medal – (1 bronze)

Year	Age	15 km individual	30 km skiathlon	50 km mass start	Sprint	4 × 10 km relay	Team sprint
2010	26	—	—	—	—	—	Bronze
2014	30	—	—	—	8	—	—

=== World Championships ===
- 2 medals – (1 gold, 1 silver)

Year	Age	15 km individual	30 km skiathlon	50 km mass start	Sprint	4 × 10 km relay	Team sprint
2009	25	—	—	—	9	—	—
2011	27	—	—	—	14	—	—
2013	29	—	—	—	—	—	Gold
2015	31	—	—	—	20	—	Silver

=== World Cup ===
==== Season standings ====
Season	Age	Discipline standings			Ski Tour standings			
Season	Age	Overall	Distance	Sprint	Nordic Opening	Tour de Ski	World Cup Final	Ski Tour Canada
2003	19	NC	—N/a	—	—N/a	—N/a	—N/a	—N/a
2004	20	NC	NC	—	—N/a	—N/a	—N/a	—N/a
2008	24	125	—	85	—N/a	—	—	—N/a
2009	25	24	83	6	—N/a	—	73	—N/a
2010	26	18	—	3rd place, bronze medalist(s)	—N/a	—	DNF	—N/a
2011	27	21	51	4	DNF	DNF	—	—N/a
2012	28	20	NC	4	DNF	DNF	DNF	—N/a
2013	29	46	—	13	DNF	—	—	—N/a
2014	30	32	—	10	—	—	DNF	—N/a
2015	31	24	NC	4	DNF	—	—N/a	—N/a
2016	32	72	83	34	DNF	—	—N/a	—
2017	33	79	—	34	—	—	—	—N/a
2018	34	NC	—	NC	—	—	—	—N/a
2019	35	NC	—	NC	—	—	—	—N/a

==== Individual podiums ====
- 3 victories – (2 WC, 1 SWC)
- 17 podiums – (13 WC, 4 SWC)

No.	Season	Date	Location	Race	Level	Place
1	2008–09	31 January 2009	Rybinsk, Russia	1.3 km Sprint F	World Cup	2nd
2	2008–09	13 February 2009	Valdidentro, Italy	1.7 km Sprint F	World Cup	2nd
3	2009–10	5 December 2009	Düsseldorf, Germany	1.5 km Sprint F	World Cup	1st
4	2009–10	13 December 2009	Davos, Switzerland	1.5 km Sprint F	World Cup	3rd
5	2009–10	22 January 2010	Rybinsk, Russia	1.3 km Sprint F	World Cup	2nd
6	2009–10	14 March 2010	Oslo, Norway	1.5 km Sprint F	World Cup	2nd
7	2010–11	12 December 2011	Davos, Switzerland	1.4 km Sprint F	World Cup	2nd
8	2010–11	31 December 2010	Oberhof, Germany	3.75 km Individual F	Stage World Cup	2nd
9	2010–11	5 February 2011	Rybinsk, Russia	1.3 km Sprint F	Stage World Cup	1st
10	2011–12	3 December 2011	Düsseldorf, Germany	1.7 km Sprint F	World Cup	2nd
11	2011–12	11 December 2011	Davos, Switzerland	1.5 km Sprint F	World Cup	1st
12	2011–12	31 December 2011	Oberstdorf, Germany	1.2 km Sprint C	Stage World Cup	2nd
13	2012–13	8 December 2012	Quebec City, Canada	1.6 km Sprint F	World Cup	3rd
14	2013–14	11 January 2014	Nové Město, Czech Republic	1.6 km Sprint F	World Cup	3rd
15	2013–14	1 March 2014	Lahti, Finland	1.55 km Sprint F	World Cup	2nd
16	2014–15	5 December 2014	Lillehammer, Norway	1.5 km Sprint F	Stage World Cup	2nd
17	2014–15	21 December 2014	Davos, Switzerland	1.3 km Sprint F	World Cup	2nd

==== Team podiums ====
- 4 victories – (4 TS)
- 8 podiums – (8 TS)

No.	Season	Date	Location	Race	Level	Place	Teammate
1	2008–09	21 December 2008	Düsseldorf, Germany	6 × 1.5 km Team Sprint F	World Cup	3rd	Morilov
2	2009–10	6 December 2009	Düsseldorf, Germany	6 × 1.5 km Team Sprint F	World Cup	1st	Morilov
3	2009–10	24 January 2010	Rybinsk, Russia	6 × 1.3 km Team Sprint F	World Cup	1st	Morilov
4	2011–12	4 December 2011	Düsseldorf, Germany	6 × 1.7 km Team Sprint F	World Cup	2nd	Kryukov
5	2011–12	15 January 2012	Milan, Italy	6 × 1.4 km Team Sprint F	World Cup	1st	Morilov
6	2013–13	4 December 2011	Quebec City, Canada	6 × 1.6 km Team Sprint F	World Cup	2nd	Kryukov
7	2013–13	13 January 2013	Liberec, Czech Republic	6 × 1.6 km Team Sprint F	World Cup	3rd	Kryukov
8	2014–15	18 January 2015	Otepää, Estonia	6 × 1.5 km Team Sprint F	World Cup	1st	Ustiugov
