= Marte Monrad-Hansen =

Norwegian cross-country skier

Marte Monrad-Hansen (born 1987) is a retired Norwegian cross-country skier.

She competed at the 2007 Junior World Championships, winning the silver medal in the 10 km pursuit. She later competed in five events at the 2013 Winter Universiade and won the silver medal in the 15 km race.

She made her World Cup debut in March 2006 at the Holmenkollen ski festival, finishing 47th. She collected her first World Cup points in the 2012 edition of the race, finishing 28th. Her best World Cup placement was 5th in a March 2007 Falun relay. Her last World Cup outing was the 2013 Holmenkollen ski festival.

She represented the sports clubs IL Heming. She also played bandy for IF Ready.
