= Szaflary =

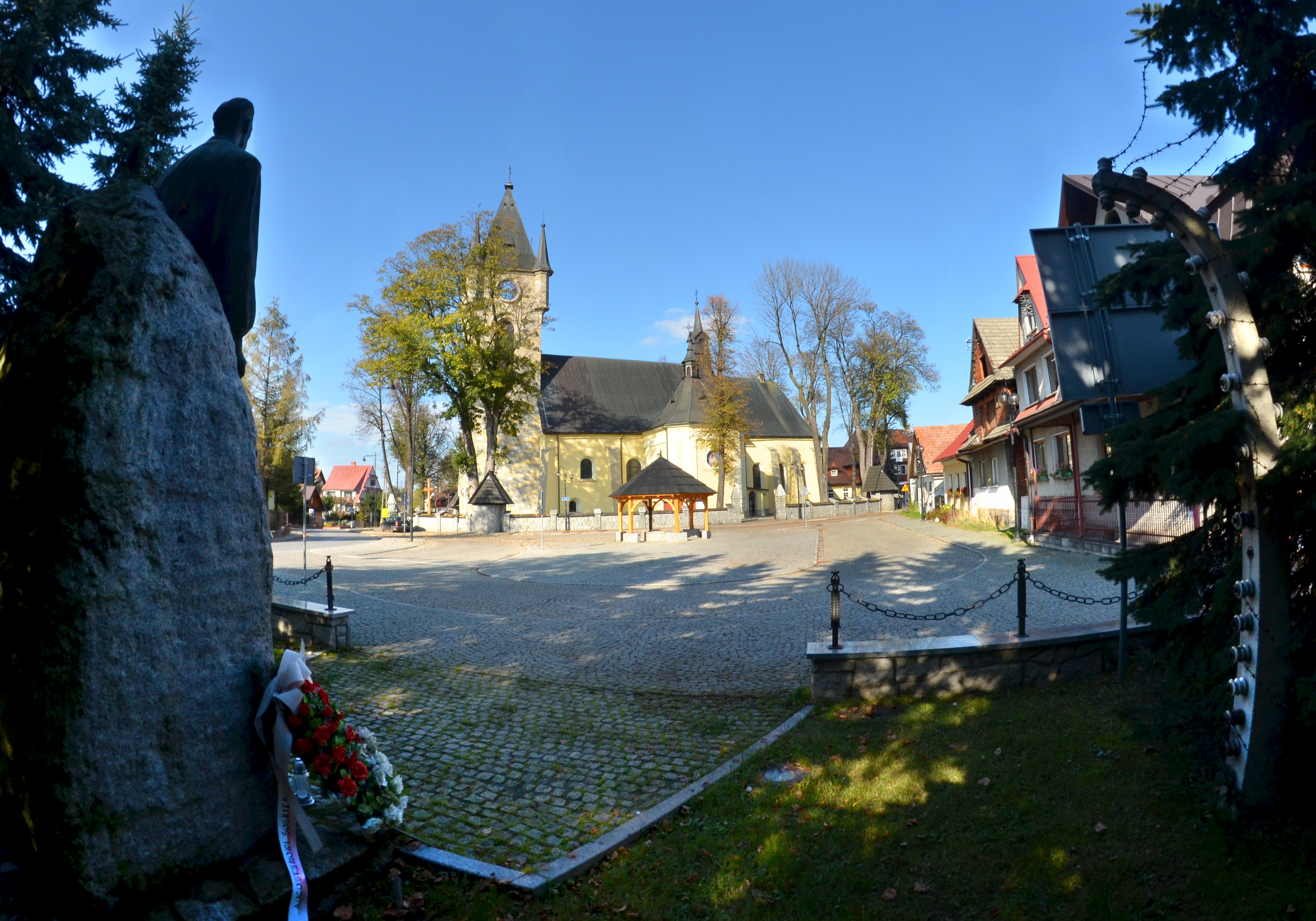
- Main square with church

- Location within Poland
- Coordinates: 49°26′N 20°2′E
- Country: Poland
- Voivodeship: Lesser Poland
- County: Nowy Targ
- Gmina: Szaflary

Population (2006)
  - Total: 2,200
- Time zone: UTC+1 (CET)
  - Summer (DST): UTC+2 (CEST)
- Postal code: 34-424
- Area code: +48 18
- Car plates: KNT

Szaflary [ʂaˈflarɨ] is a village in southern Poland situated in the Lesser Poland Voivodeship since 1999 (it was previously in Nowy Sącz Voivodeship from 1975 to 1998). Szaflary has about 2,200 residents. There is a church, a fire station, and a few grocery stores in the village. The village lies along the Dunajec River.

== See also ==
- Zakopianka
- Nowy Targ
- Zakopane
