= Mona-Liisa Nousiainen =

Finnish cross-country skier (1983–2019)

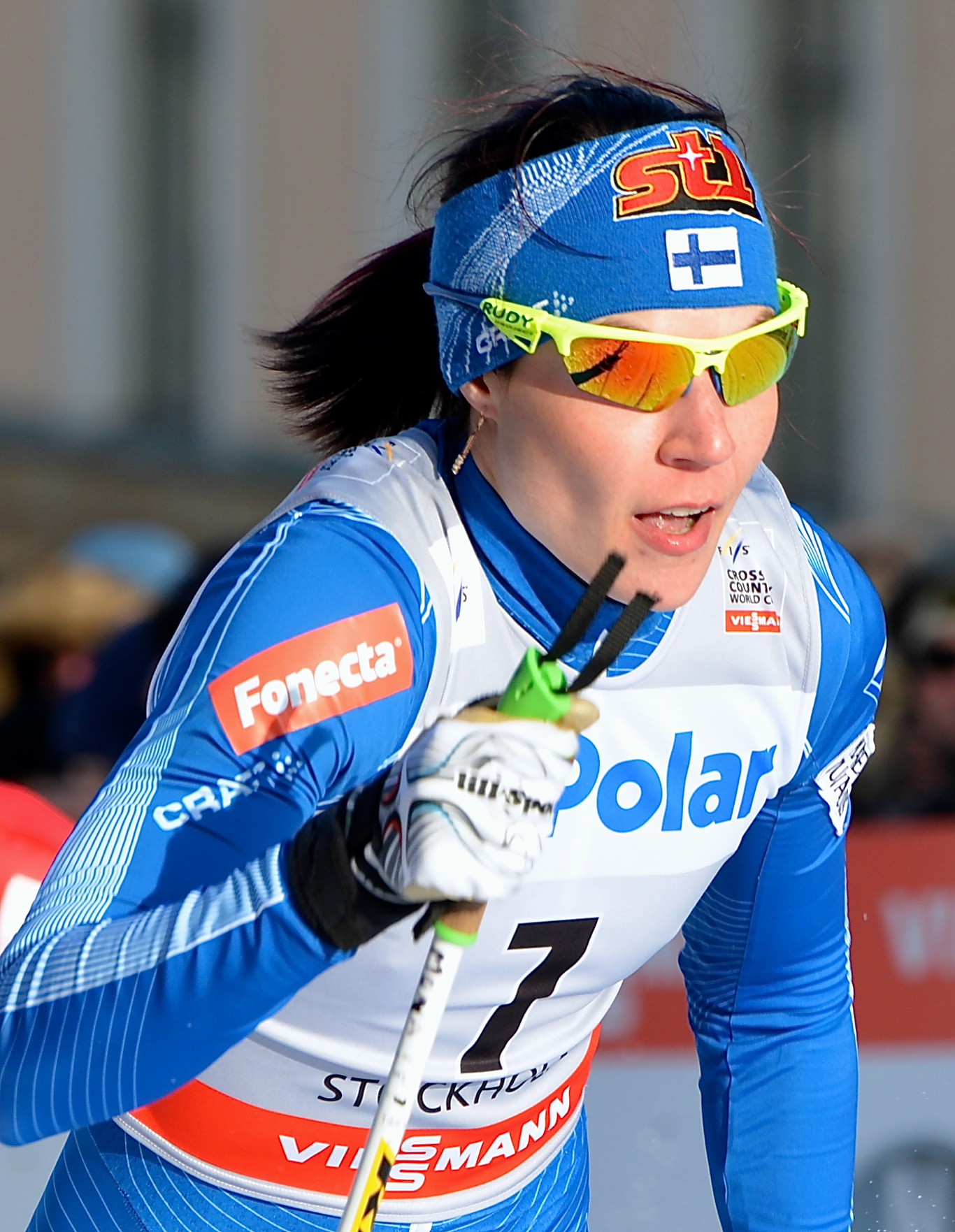
- Mona-Liisa Nousiainen during the Stockholm Royal Palace Sprint in Sweden in March 2013

Personal information
- Born: Mona-Liisa Malvalehto; 20 July 1983 Rovaniemi, Finland
- Died: 29 July 2019 (aged 36) Kouvola, Finland
- Spouse: Ville Nousiainen (m. 2015)

Sport
- Sport: Skiing
- Club: Kouvolan Hiihtoseura

World Cup career
- Seasons: 17 – (2002–2018)
- Indiv. starts: 110
- Indiv. podiums: 1
- Indiv. wins: 1
- Team starts: 12
- Team podiums: 2
- Team wins: 1
- Overall titles: 0 – (27th in 2007)
- Discipline titles: 0
Medal record
Representing Finland
Women's cross-country skiing
Junior World Championships
Gold medal – first place	2001 Karpacz	4 × 5 km relay
Gold medal – first place	2002 Schonach	Individual sprint
Gold medal – first place	2003 Sollefteå	5 km classical
Silver medal – second place	2003 Sollefteå	4 × 5 km relay
Bronze medal – third place	2002 Schonach	15 km classical

Mona-Liisa Nousiainen (née Malvalehto; 20 July 1983 – 29 July 2019) was a Finnish cross-country skier who competed in the World Cup between 2002 and 2018. Her best World Cup finish was first place in a sprint event in Liberec, in the Czech Republic, on 12 January 2013.

Malvalehto's best finish at the FIS Nordic World Ski Championships was seventh in the sprint event at Oberstdorf in 2005.

In 1999, she won the Finnish Championship in accordion playing. She studied at the Sibelius Academy.

She announced her retirement from cross-country skiing after not being selected for the 2018 Winter Olympics.

Mona-Liisa Nousiainen was married to fellow cross-country skier Ville Nousiainen since 2015, with whom she had one daughter. She was a friend of Swedish cross-country skier Charlotte Kalla.

Nousiainen died of stomach cancer on 29 July 2019 at the age of 36. She is buried in Valkeala cemetery in Kouvola.

== Cross-country skiing results ==
All results are sourced from the International Ski Federation (FIS).

=== Olympic Games ===
Year	Age	10 km individual	15 km skiathlon	30 km mass start	Sprint	4 × 5 km relay	Team sprint
2014	30	—	—	—	28	—	—

=== World Championships ===
Year	Age	10 km individual	15 km skiathlon	30 km mass start	Sprint	4 × 5 km relay	Team sprint
2005	21	—	—	—	7	—	—
2007	23	—	—	—	12	—	—
2013	29	—	—	—	7	—	—
2015	31	—	—	—	22	—	—

=== World Cup ===
==== Season standings ====
Season	Age	Discipline standings			Ski Tour standings			
Season	Age	Overall	Distance	Sprint	Nordic Opening	Tour de Ski	World Cup Final	Ski Tour Canada
2002	18	71	—N/a	47	—N/a	—N/a	—N/a	—N/a
2003	19	61	—N/a	43	—N/a	—N/a	—N/a	—N/a
2004	20	64	58	45	—N/a	—N/a	—N/a	—N/a
2005	21	39	—	18	—N/a	—N/a	—N/a	—N/a
2006	22	58	NC	32	—N/a	—N/a	—N/a	—N/a
2007	23	27	NC	11	—N/a	—	—N/a	—N/a
2008	24	38	NC	24	—N/a	—	—	—N/a
2009	25	82	NC	57	—N/a	—	—	—N/a
2010	26	NC	—	NC	—N/a	—	—	—N/a
2011	27	NC	—	NC	—	—	—	—N/a
2012	28	40	NC	18	55	—	DNF	—N/a
2013	29	30	NC	8	DNF	—	39	—N/a
2014	30	54	NC	25	DNF	—	—	—N/a
2015	31	61	NC	28	67	—	—N/a	—N/a
2016	32	63	NC	42	50	—	—N/a	—
2017	33	104	—	77	—	—	—	—N/a
2018	34	NC	—	NC	—	—	—	—N/a

==== Individual podiums ====
- 1 victory

No.	Season	Date	Location	Race	Level	Place
1	2012–13	12 January 2013	Liberec, Czech Republic	0.85 km Sprint C	World Cup	1st

==== Team podiums ====
- 1 victory – (1 TS)
- 2 podiums – (2 TS)

No.	Season	Date	Location	Race	Level	Place	Teammate
1	2012–13	3 March 2013	Sochi, Russia	6 × 1.25 km Team Sprint C	World Cup	1st	Kyllönen
2	2013–14	12 January 2014	Nové Město, Czech Republic	6 × 1.3 km Team Sprint C	World Cup	2nd	Saarinen
