= Bór, Lesser Poland Voivodeship =

Bór
- Village
- Location within Poland
- Coordinates: 49°26′07″N 20°03′37″E
- Country: Poland
- Voivodeship: Lesser Poland
- County: Nowy Targ
- Gmina: Szaflary

Bór [bur] is a village in the administrative district of Gmina Szaflary, within Nowy Targ County, Lesser Poland Voivodeship, in southern Poland.
