= Ole Martin Storlien =

Norwegian Nordic combined skier

Ole Martin Storlien (born 30 June 1988) is a former Norwegian Nordic combined skier, who competed for the Veldre ski club. Storlien came at a 21st place in Vikersund 2009. That was his World Cup debut. He also has some great results from the Continental Cup (earlier named World Cup B). A 2nd place as best. Storlien came at the 7th place in the World Junior Championships 2008 in Zakopane.

He retired at the end of the 2015-16 season.
