= 2002 Nordic Junior World Ski Championships =

International skiing competition

FIS Nordic Junior World Ski Championships 2002
- Host city: Schonach im Schwarzwald, Germany
- Events: 10
- Opening: 20 January
- Closing: 27 January

The FIS Nordic Junior World Ski Championships 2002 took place in Schonach im Schwarzwald, Germany from 20 January to 27 January 2002. It was the 25th Junior World Championships in Nordic skiing.

== Schedule ==
All times are in Central European Time (CET).

Cross-country

Date	Time	Event
22 January	09:30	Women's 15 km classic mass start
22 January	10:30	Men's 30 km classic mass start
24 January	10:00	Women's 5 km free
24 January	11:15	Men's 10 km free
26 January	09:00	Women's sprint free
26 January	09:35	Men's sprint free
27 January	Cancelled	Women's 4×5 km relay
27 January	Cancelled	Men's 4×10 km relay

Nordic combined

Date	Time	Event
23 January	14:30	K90 / 10 km
25 January	10:00	Team 4×5 km Mass Start / K90
27 January	Cancelled	Sprint K90 / 5 km

Ski jumping

Date	Time	Event
24 January	19:00	Team K90
26 January	15:00	Individual K90

== Medal summary ==
=== Junior events ===
==== Cross-country skiing ====
Event	Gold		Silver		Bronze	
Men's Junior Events
Men's sprint free	Johannes Bredl; Germany		Ulrich Eger; Austria		Frederik Byström; Sweden	
Men's 10 kilometre free	Kristian Horntvedt; Norway	29:34.1	Johan Höök; Sweden	+3.7	Alexey Troussov; Russia	+33.5
Men's 30 kilometre classic mass start	Aivar Rehemaa; Estonia	1:27:50.2	Maxim Bulgakov; Russia	+23.3	Eivind Juul-Pedersen; Norway	+1:30.9
Men's 4 × 10 km relay	Cancelled due to weather conditions					
Ladies' Junior Events
Ladies' sprint free	Mona-Liisa Malvalehto; Finland		Nicole Fessel; Germany		Kjersti Nordberg; Norway	
Ladies' 5 kilometre free	Élodie Bourgeois-Pin; France	16:15.1	Cécile Storti; France	+27.5	Irina Terentjeva; Lithuania	+33.8
Ladies' 15 kilometre classic mass start	Yevgeniya Kravtsova; Russia	44:00.0	Ellen Sandbakken; Norway	+4.2	Mona-Liisa Malvalehto; Finland	+5.0
Ladies' 4 × 5 km relay	Cancelled due to weather conditions					

==== Nordic Combined ====
Event	Gold		Silver		Bronze	
Normal hill/5 km	Cancelled due to weather conditions					
Normal hill/10 km	Björn Kircheisen; Germany	30:54.2	Alex Glueck; United States	+2:14.5	Nathan Gerhart; United States	+2:19.6
Team 4 × 5 km/normal hill	Germany; Florian Schillinger; Tino Edelmann; Christian Beetz; Björn Kircheisen	844.0	France; Maxime Laheurte; Mathieu Martinez; François Braud; Sébastien Lacroix	763.3	Norway; Jo Wesche Fossheim; Magnus Moan; Mathias Østvik; Petter Tande	742.7

==== Ski jumping ====
Event	Gold		Silver		Bronze	
Individual normal hill	Janne Happonen; Finland	255.5	Daiki Ito; Japan	248.0	Kalle Keituri; Finland	245.0
Team normal hill	Finland; Janne Happonen; Harri Olli; Arttu Lappi; Akseli Kokkonen	953.0	Austria; Balthasar Schneider; Christoph Strickner; Christian Nagiller; Manuel Fettner	924.0	Slovenia; Bine Zupan; Zvonko Kordež; Rok Benkovič; Jaka Oblak	851.0

=== Medal table ===
* Host nation (Germany)

Rank	Nation	Gold	Silver	Bronze	Total
1	Germany (GER)*	3	1	0	4
2	Finland (FIN)	3	0	2	5
3	France (FRA)	1	2	0	3
4	Norway (NOR)	1	1	3	5
5	Russia (RUS)	1	1	1	3
6	Estonia (EST)	1	0	0	1
7	Austria (AUT)	0	2	0	2
8	Sweden (SWE)	0	1	1	2
8	United States (USA)	0	1	1	2
10	Japan (JPN)	0	1	0	1
11	Lithuania (LTU)	0	0	1	1
11	Slovenia (SVN)	0	0	1	1
Totals (12 entries)		10	10	10	30
