= 2003 Nordic Junior World Ski Championships =

International skiing competition

FIS Nordic Junior World Ski Championships 2003
- Host city: Sollefteå, Sweden
- Events: 13
- Opening: 4 February
- Closing: 9 February
- Main venue: Hallstabacken; Hallstaberget Ski Stadium

The FIS Nordic Junior World Ski Championships 2003 took place in Sollefteå, Sweden from 4 February to 9 February 2003. It was the 26th Junior World Championships in Nordic skiing.

== Schedule ==
All times are in Central European Time (CET).

Cross-country

Date	Time	Event
4 February	10:00	Women's 15 km free mass start
4 February	12:00	Men's 30 km free mass start
6 February	10:00	Women's 5 km classic
6 February	12:00	Men's 10 km classic
8 February	09:00	Women's sprint free
8 February	09:30	Men's sprint free
9 February	09:30	Women's 4×5 km relay
9 February	11:30	Men's 4×10 km relay

Nordic combined

Date	Time	Event
5 February	14:00	HS120 / 10 km
7 February	09:30	Team 4×5 km Mass Start / HS120
9 February	14:00	Sprint HS120 / 5 km

Ski jumping

Date	Time	Event
6 February	14:00	Team HS120
7 February	16:00	Individual HS120

== Medal summary ==
=== Junior events ===
==== Cross-country skiing ====
Event	Gold		Silver		Bronze	
Men's Junior Events
Men's sprint free	Johan Kjølstad; Norway		Erik Bakkejord; Norway		Sylvain Fanjas Claret; France	
Men's 10 kilometre classic	Yevgeny Dementyev; Russia	27:40.0	Yevgeniy Koshevoy; Kazakhstan	+29.1	Maxim Bulgakov; Russia	+31.9
Men's 30 kilometre free mass start	Chris Jespersen; Norway	1:23:13.5	Alexey Petukhov; Russia	+33.2	Yevgeny Dementyev; Russia	+57.5
Men's 4 × 10 km relay	Russia; Maxim Bulgakov; Artem Norin; Yevgeny Dementyev; Alexey Petukhov	1:45:39.7	Norway; Øystein Pettersen; Martin Johnsrud Sundby; Tord Asle Gjerdalen; Chris Jespersen	+2:11.7	Germany; Steve Ullmann; Stefan Kirchner; Franz Göring; Eric Schneider	+3:10.9
Ladies' Junior Events
Ladies' sprint free	Nicole Fessel; Germany		Justyna Kowalczyk; Poland		Christine Mathiesen; Norway	
Ladies' 5 kilometre classic	Mona-Liisa Malvalehto; Finland	15:23.5	Yekaterina Vorontsova; Russia	+25.8	Elena Plotzskaya; Russia	+31.0
Ladies' 15 kilometre free mass start	Yekaterina Vorontsova; Russia	46:37.7	Maria Rydqvist; Sweden	+36.7	Irina Artemova; Russia	+39.4
Ladies' 4 × 5 km relay	Russia; Valentina Novikova; Elena Plotskaya; Irina Artemova; Yekaterina Vorontsova	58:51.3	Finland; Reetta Jäskelainen; Mona-Liisa Malvalehto; Hilla Herranen; Lotta Puttonen	+ 29.0	Sweden; Julia Limby; Helena Kallander; Hanna Forsberg; Maria Rydqvist	+45.2

==== Nordic Combined ====
Event	Gold		Silver		Bronze	
Normal hill/5 km	Björn Kircheisen; Germany	14:02.6	David Zauner; Austria	+8.7	Petter Tande; Norway	+28.4
Normal hill/10 km	Björn Kircheisen; Germany	28:39.2	Sébastien Lacroix; France	+13.3	Petter Tande; Norway	+45.5
Team 4 × 5 km/normal hill	Germany; Christian Beetz; Marco Kühne; Tino Edelmann; Björn Kircheisen		Norway; Magnus Moan; Petter Tande; Jon-Richard Rundsveen; Mikko Kokslien		France; Maxime Laheurte; Sébastien Lacroix; François Braud; Jason Lamy-Chappuis	

==== Ski jumping ====
Event	Gold		Silver		Bronze	
Individual normal hill	Thomas Morgenstern; Austria	261.0	Rok Benkovic; Slovenia	258.2	Jan Mazoch; Czech Republic	241.9
Team normal hill	Austria; Nicolas Fettner; Christoph Strickner; Roland Müller; Thomas Morgenstern	945.2	Slovenia; Rok Benkovič; Jure Bogataj; Rok Urbanc; Jaka Oblak	944.8	Finland; Jarkko Heikkonen; Antti Pesonen; Olli Pekkala; Harri Olli	895.1

=== Medal table ===
* Host nation (Sweden)

Rank	Nation	Gold	Silver	Bronze	Total
1	Russia (RUS)	4	2	4	10
2	Germany (GER)	4	0	1	5
3	Norway (NOR)	2	3	3	8
4	Austria (AUT)	2	1	0	3
5	Finland (FIN)	1	1	1	3
6	Slovenia (SVN)	0	2	0	2
7	France (FRA)	0	1	2	3
8	Sweden (SWE)*	0	1	1	2
9	Kazakhstan (KAZ)	0	1	0	1
9	Poland (POL)	0	1	0	1
11	Czech Republic (CZE)	0	0	1	1
Totals (11 entries)		13	13	13	39
