= Irina Khazova =

Russian cross-country skier

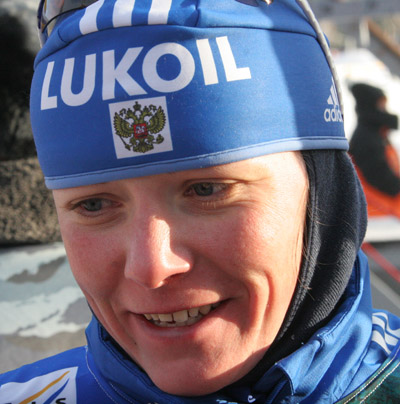
- Irina Khazova in 2010

Personal information
- Nationality: Russia
- Born: 20 March 1984 (age 42) Sarov, Soviet Union

Sport
- Sport: Skiing

World Cup career
- Seasons: 8 – (2004–2007, 2010, 2012–2014)
- Indiv. starts: 87
- Indiv. podiums: 3
- Indiv. wins: 1
- Team starts: 14
- Team podiums: 1
- Team wins: 0
- Overall titles: 0 – (13th in 2010)
- Discipline titles: 0
Medal record
Women's cross-country skiing
Representing Russia
Olympic Games
Bronze medal – third place	2010 Vancouver	Team sprint
U23 World Championships
Silver medal – second place	2006 Kranj	10 km classical
Silver medal – second place	2006 Kranj	15 km skiathlon
Junior World Championships
Gold medal – first place	2003 Sollefteå	4 × 5 km relay
Gold medal – first place	2004 Stryn	5 km freestyle
Gold medal – first place	2004 Stryn	15 km classical
Gold medal – first place	2004 Stryn	4 × 5 km relay
Bronze medal – third place	2003 Sollefteå	15 km freestyle

Irina Viktorovna Khazova, born Irina Artemova (Russian: Ирина Викторовна Хазова; born March 20, 1984, in Sarov) is a Russian cross-country skier who competed from 2003 to 2007. She was then suspended for two years for the use of illegal drugs (doping). She then resumed her career for the 2009–10 Olympic season in very good shape. Khazova won a bronze in the women's team sprint event at the 2010 Winter Olympics in Vancouver.

Her best World Cup finish so far is a second place, which she earned in a 10 km classic competition at Ruka, Kuusamo, Finland on November 29, 2009.

Khazova competed for Russia at the 2007 World Championships in Sapporo, finishing 24th in the 7.5 km + 7.5 km double pursuit.

== Doping sanction ==
Khazova tested positive for the diuretic Furosemide in 2007 and received a two-year sanction from sports.

== Cross-country skiing results ==
All results are sourced from the International Ski Federation (FIS).

=== Olympic Games ===
- 1 medal – (1 bronze)

Year	Age	10 km individual	15 km skiathlon	30 km mass start	Sprint	4 × 5 km relay	Team sprint
2010	25	20	13	—	—	7	Bronze
2014	29	—	24	29	49	—	—

=== World Championships ===
Year	Age	10 km individual	15 km skiathlon	30 km mass start	Sprint	4 × 5 km relay	Team sprint
2007	22	—	—	—	—	—	—

=== World Cup ===
==== Season standings ====
Season	Age	Discipline standings			Ski Tour standings		
Season	Age	Overall	Distance	Sprint	Nordic Opening	Tour de Ski	World Cup Final
2004	20	58	41	NC	—N/a	—N/a	—N/a
2005	21	45	26	NC	—N/a	—N/a	—N/a
2006	22	76	57	—	—N/a	—N/a	—N/a
2007	23	39	29	NC	—N/a	25	—N/a
2010	26	13	9	NC	—N/a	—	24
2012	28	75	56	NC	DNF	—	—
2013	29	58	39	NC	30	31	—
2014	30	52	41	NC	—	20	—

==== Individual podiums ====
- 1 victory
- 3 podiums

No.	Season	Date	Location	Race	Level	Place
1	2009–10	29 November 2009	Rukatunturi, Finland	10 km Individual C	World Cup	2nd
2	2009–10	12 December 2009	Davos, Switzerland	10 km Individual F	World Cup	1st
3	2009–10	5 February 2010	Canmore, Canada	10 km Individual F	World Cup	3rd

==== Team podiums ====
- 1 podium

No.	Season	Date	Location	Race	Level	Place	Teammate
1	2009–10	24 January 2010	Rybinsk, Russia	6 × 1.3 km Team Sprint	World Cup	3rd	Rocheva
