= Nikolay Morilov =

Russian cross-country skier

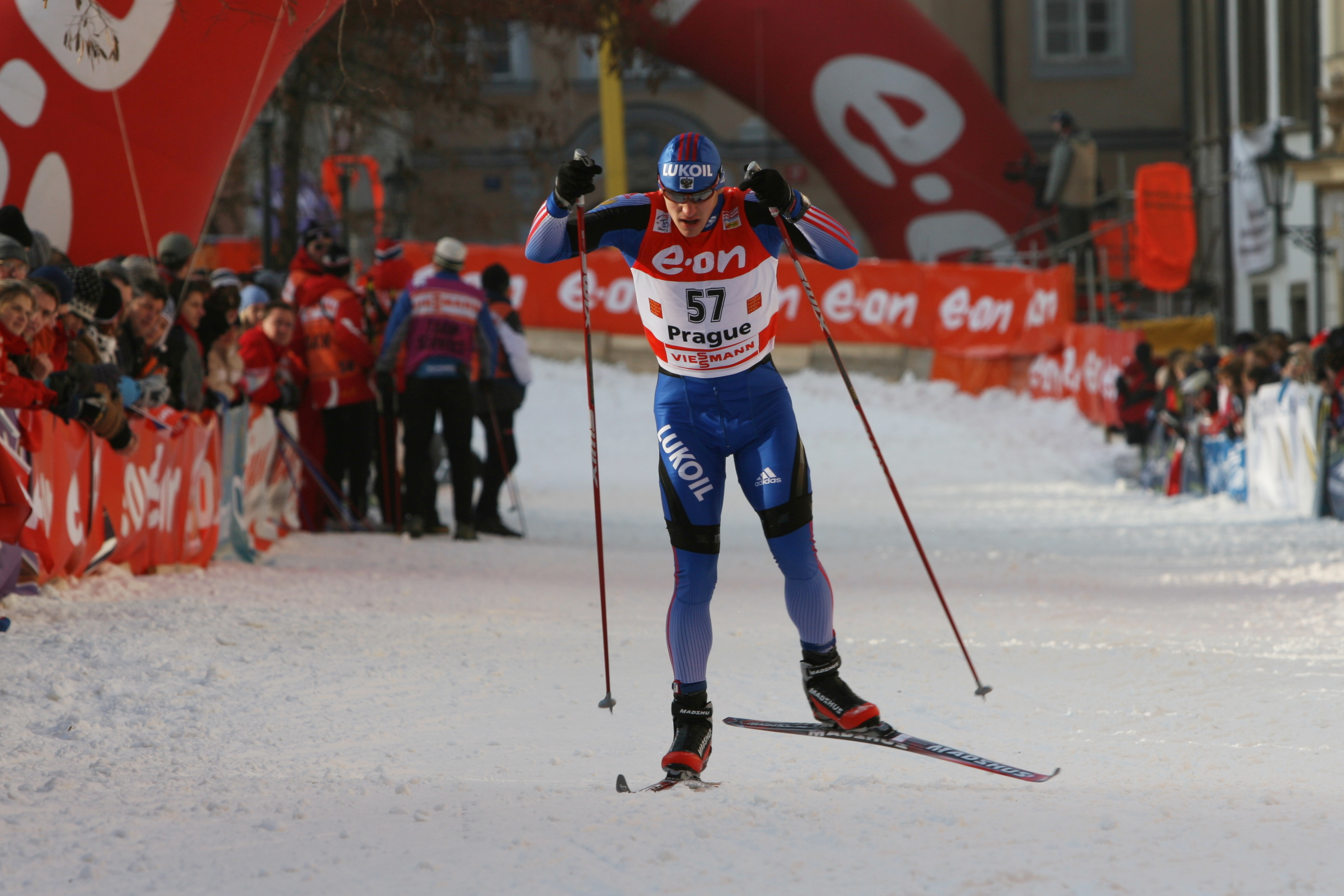

Personal information
- Nationality: Russia
- Born: 11 August 1986 (age 39) Perm, Soviet Union

Sport
- Sport: Skiing
- Club: Tyumen

World Cup career
- Seasons: 13 – (2005–2017)
- Indiv. starts: 100
- Indiv. podiums: 7
- Indiv. wins: 3
- Team starts: 16
- Team podiums: 5
- Team wins: 4
- Overall titles: 0 – (15th in 2012)
- Discipline titles: 0
Medal record
Men's cross-country skiing
Representing Russia
Olympic Games
Bronze medal – third place	2010 Vancouver	Team sprint
World Championships
Silver medal – second place	2007 Sapporo	Team sprint
Bronze medal – third place	2009 Liberec	Individual sprint
U23 World Championships
Bronze medal – third place	2008 Mals	Individual sprint
Junior World Championships
Bronze medal – third place	2004 Stryn	10 km freestyle
Bronze medal – third place	2004 Stryn	4 × 10 km relay
World Military Games
Gold medal – first place	2017 Sochi	Team sprint

Nikolay Sergeyevich Morilov (Russian: Николай Серге́евич Морилов; born 11 August 1986 in Perm) is a Russian cross-country skier who has been competing since 2004. He won two medals at the FIS Nordic World Ski Championships with a silver in the team sprint (2007) and a bronze in the individual sprint (2009).

Morilov has two individual victories at the junior level of cross country up to 10 km, both in 2004.

Morilov won bronze with Alexey Petukhov in the Team Sprint at the 2010 Winter Olympics in Vancouver. In his World Cup career, Morilov has had 100 starts across 13 seasons, and seven podium finishes.

== Cross-country skiing results ==
All results are sourced from the International Ski Federation (FIS).

=== Olympic Games ===
- 1 medal – (1 bronze)

Year	Age	15 km individual	30 km skiathlon	50 km mass start	Sprint	4 × 10 km relay	Team sprint
2010	23	—	—	—	26	—	Bronze

=== World Championships ===
- 2 medals – (1 silver, 1 bronze)

Year	Age	15 km individual	30 km skiathlon	50 km mass start	Sprint	4 × 10 km relay	Team sprint
2007	20	—	—	—	20	—	Silver
2009	22	—	—	—	Bronze	—	—
2011	24	—	—	—	8	—	—

=== World Cup ===
==== Season standings ====
Season	Age	Discipline standings			Ski Tour standings			
Season	Age	Overall	Distance	Sprint	Nordic Opening	Tour de Ski	World Cup Final	Ski Tour Canada
2005	19	NC	—	NC	—N/a	—N/a	—N/a	—N/a
2006	20	112	—	47	—N/a	—N/a	—N/a	—N/a
2007	21	52	70	28	—N/a	—	—N/a	—N/a
2008	22	42	NC	15	—N/a	52	—	—N/a
2009	23	31	—	8	—N/a	—	—	—N/a
2010	24	25	NC	8	—N/a	—	36	—N/a
2011	25	44	NC	14	DNF	DNF	DNF	—N/a
2012	26	15	69	2nd place, silver medalist(s)	49	DNF	DNF	—N/a
2013	27	54	—	18	DNF	—	—	—N/a
2014	28	66	NC	27	—	—	—	—N/a
2015	29	64	—	24	—	—	—N/a	—N/a
2016	30	83	—	43	—	—	—N/a	—
2017	31	172	—	101	—	—	—	—N/a

==== Individual podiums ====
- 3 victories – (1 WC, 2 SWC)
- 7 podiums – (4 WC, 3 SWC)

No.	Season	Date	Location	Race	Level	Place
1	2007–08	31 December 2007	Prague, Czech Republic	1.5 km Sprint F	Stage World Cup	1st
2	2008–09	7 March 2009	Lahti, Finland	1.55 km Sprint F	World Cup	3rd
3	2009–10	22 January 2010	Rybinsk, Russia	1.3 km Sprint F	World Cup	1st
4	2011–12	18 December 2011	Rogla, Slovenia	1.2 km Sprint F	World Cup	2nd
5	2011–12	13 January 2013	Oberstdorf, Germany	1.2 km Sprint C	Stage World Cup	3rd
6	2011–12	4 January 2012	Toblach, Italy	1.3 km Sprint F	Stage World Cup	1st
7	2011–12	17 February 2012	Szklarska Poręba, Poland	1.6 km Sprint F	World Cup	2nd

==== Team podiums ====
- 4 victories – (4 TS)
- 5 podiums – (5 TS)

No.	Season	Date	Location	Race	Level	Place	Teammate
1	2008–09	21 December 2008	Düsseldorf, Germany	6 × 1.5 km Team Sprint F	World Cup	3rd	Petukhov
2	2009–10	6 December 2009	Düsseldorf, Germany	6 × 1.5 km Team Sprint F	World Cup	1st	Petukhov
3	2009–10	24 January 2010	Rybinsk, Russia	6 × 1.3 km Team Sprint F	World Cup	1st	Petukhov
4	2011–12	15 January 2012	Milan, Italy	6 × 1.4 km Team Sprint F	World Cup	1st	Petukhov
5	2012–13	13 January 2013	Liberec, Czech Republic	6 × 1.6 km Team Sprint F	World Cup	1st	Devyatyarov Jr.
