= Skrzypne =

- Village
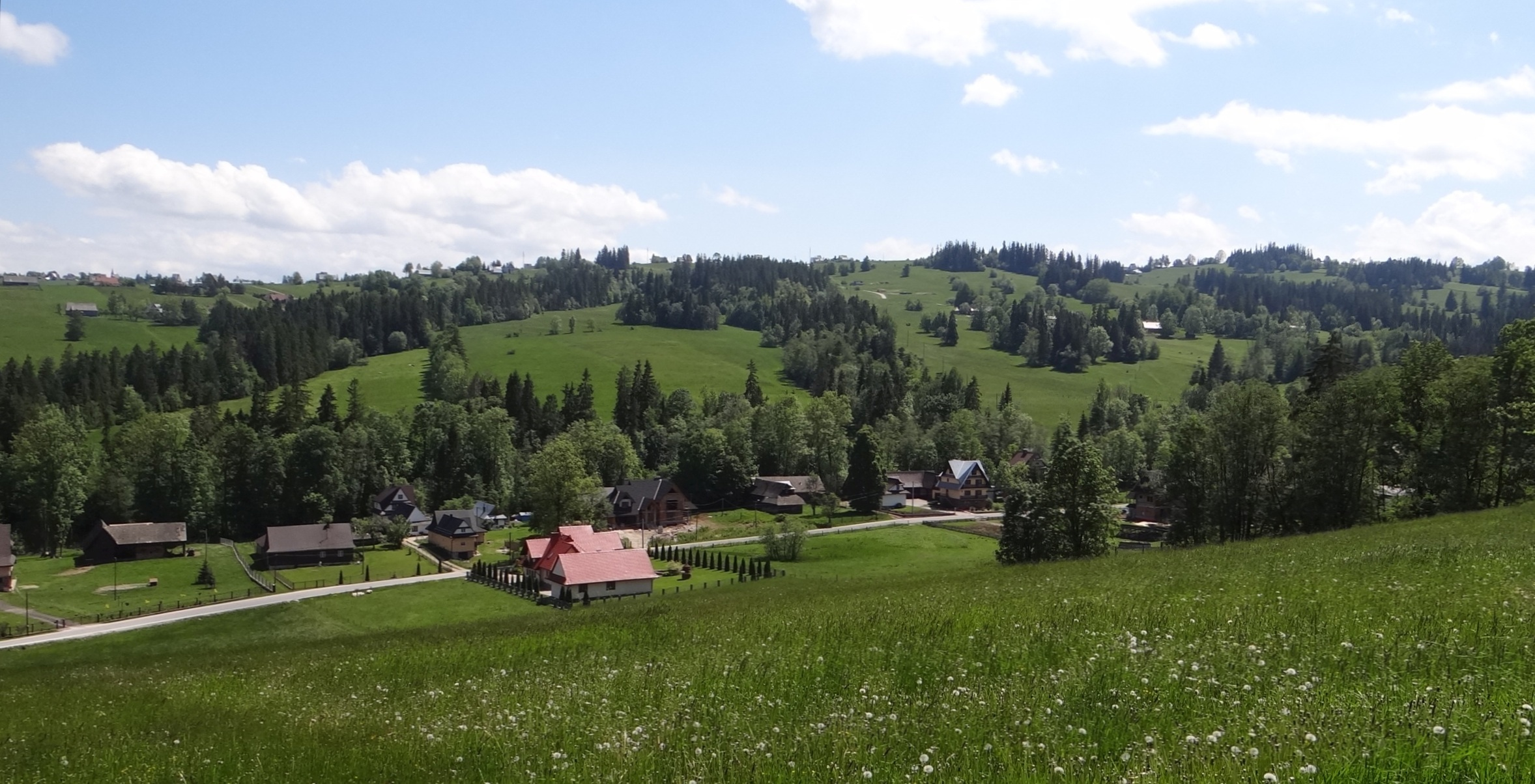
- General view
- Interactive map of Skrzypne
- Location within Poland
- Coordinates: 49°24′N 19°57′E
- Country: Poland
- Voivodeship: Lesser Poland
- County: Nowy Targ
- Gmina: Szaflary

Skrzypne [ˈskʂɨpnɛ] is a village in the administrative district of Gmina Szaflary, within Nowy Targ County, Lesser Poland Voivodeship, in southern Poland.
