= Tobias Kammerlander =

Austrian Nordic combined skier (born 1986)

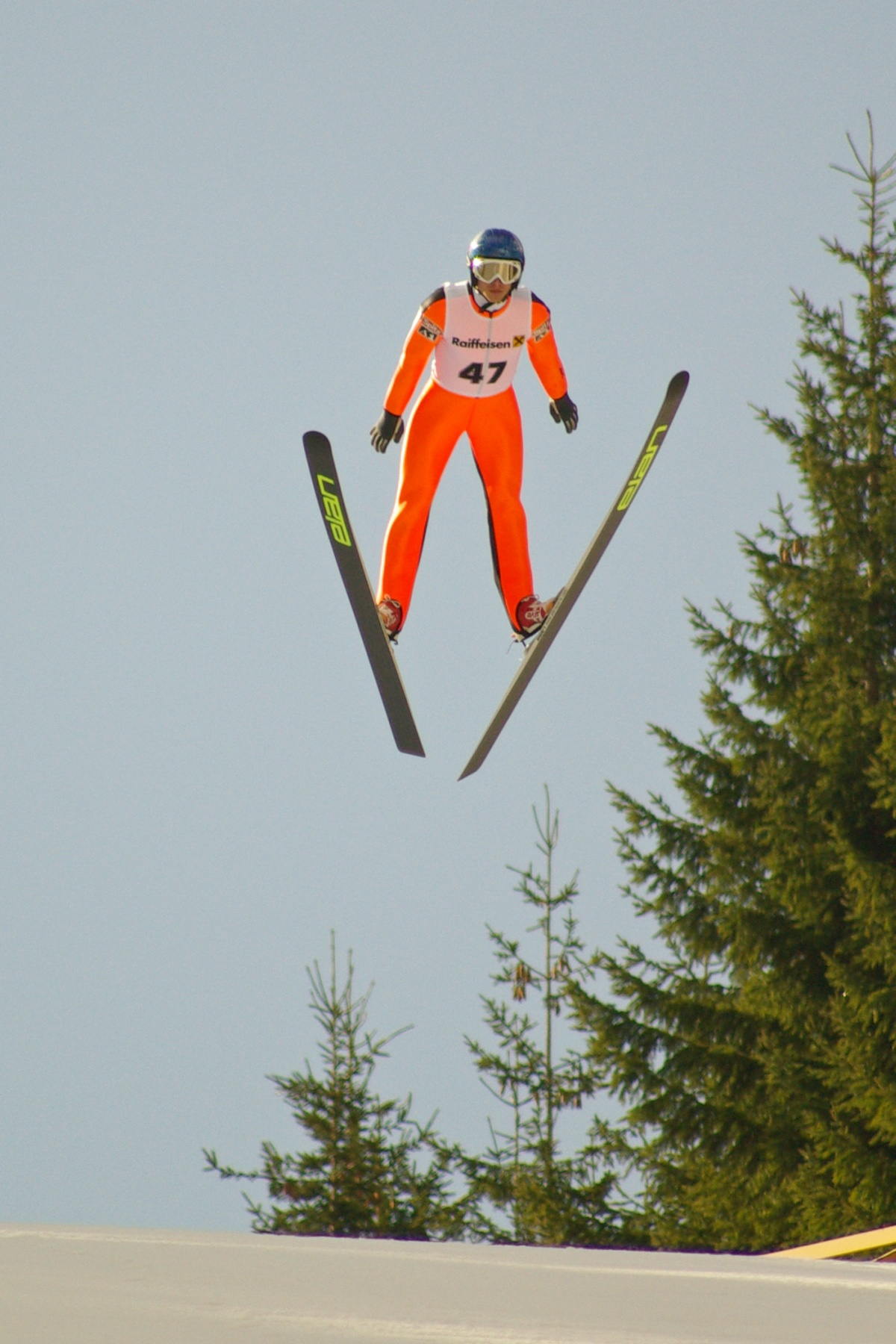
Tobias Kammerlander in March 2008

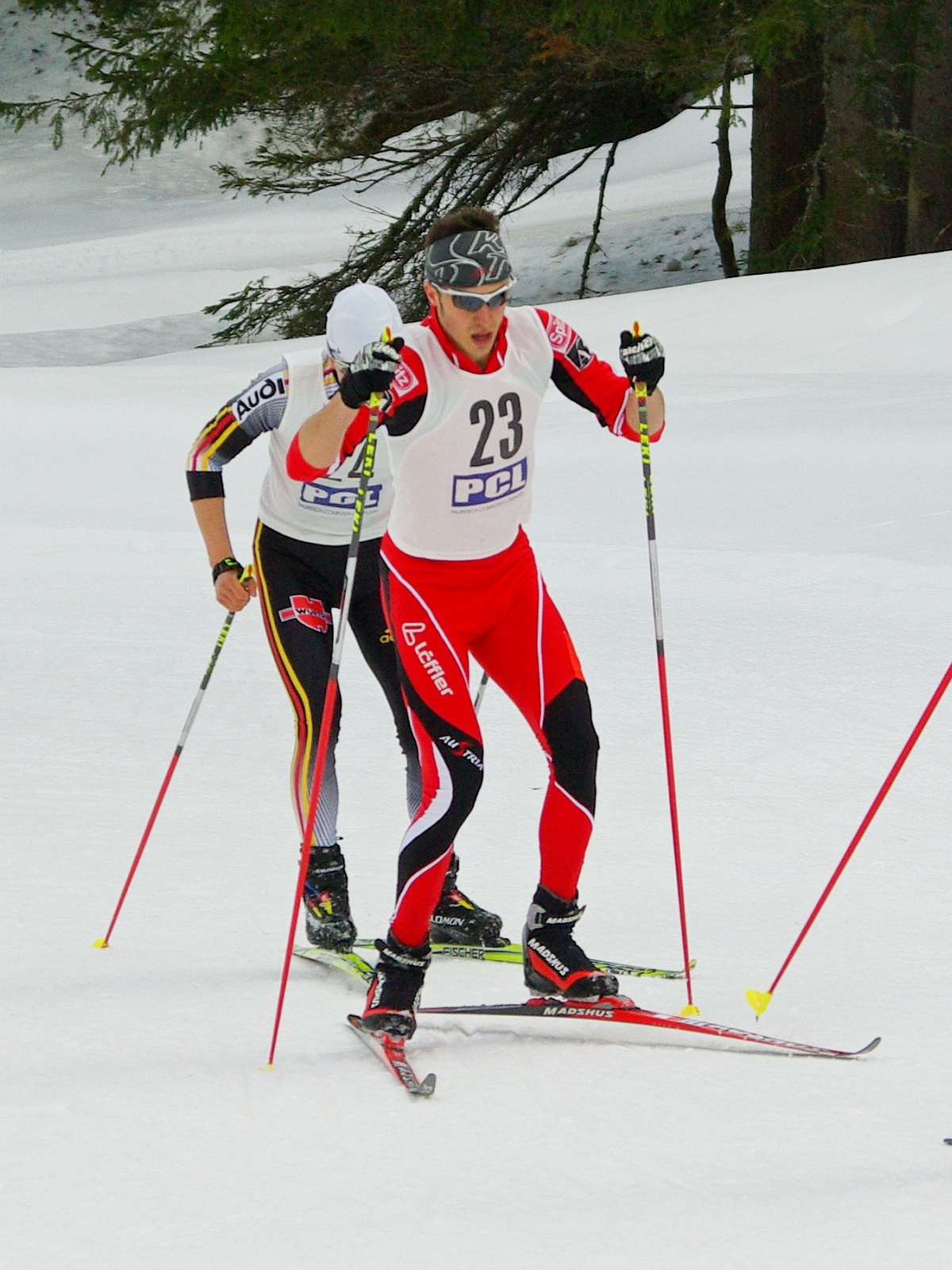
Tobias Kammerlander in March 2008

Tobias Kammerlander (born 25 March 1986) is an Austrian Nordic combined skier who has competed since 2003. His best World Cup finish was third in a 4 x 5 km team event in Germany in January 2010 while his best individual finish was 17th twice (Germany in 2008 and Italy in 2009).
