= Marco Pichlmayer =

Austrian Nordic combined skier (born 1987)

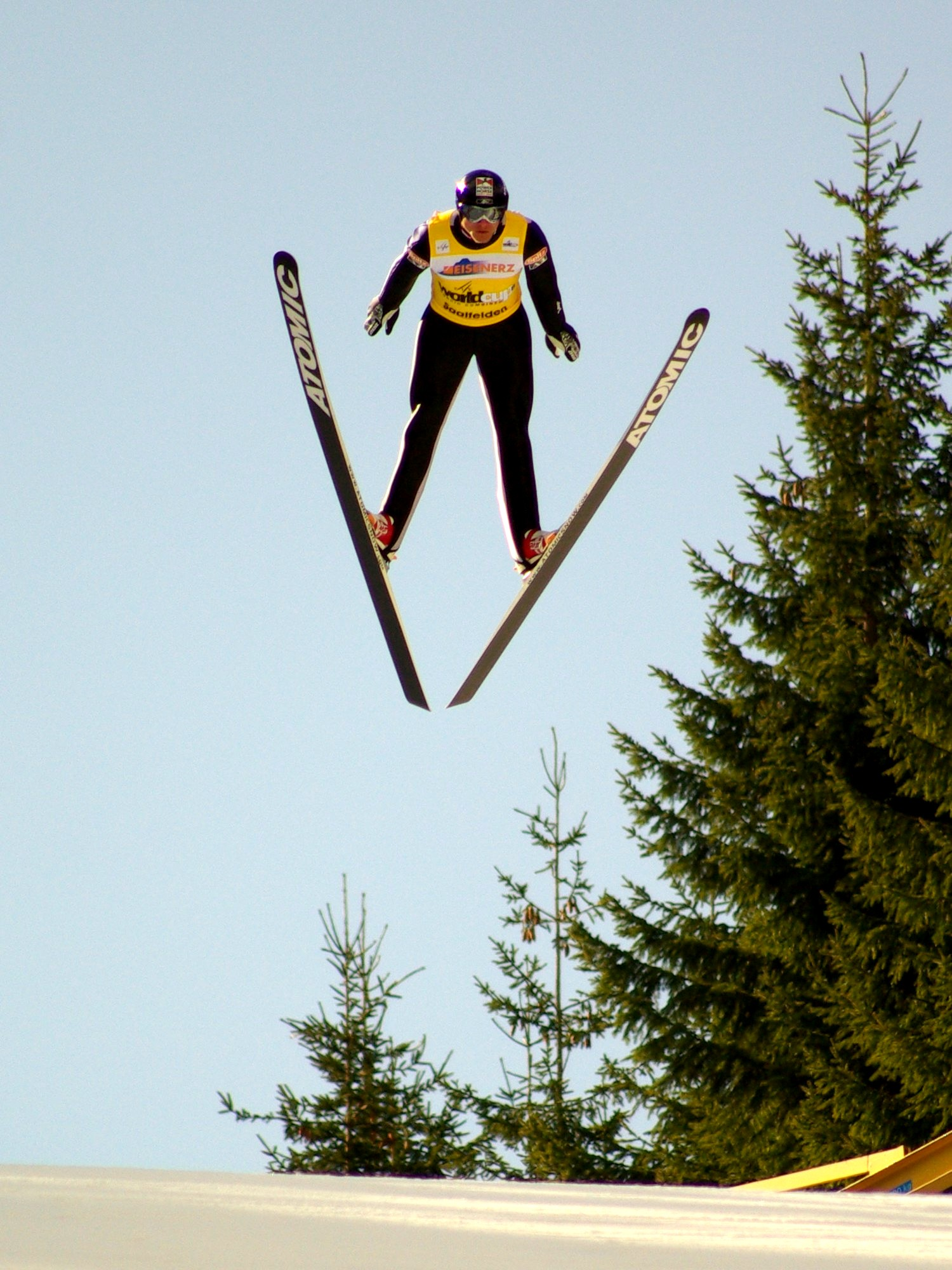
Marco Pichlmayer, Eisenerz 2008

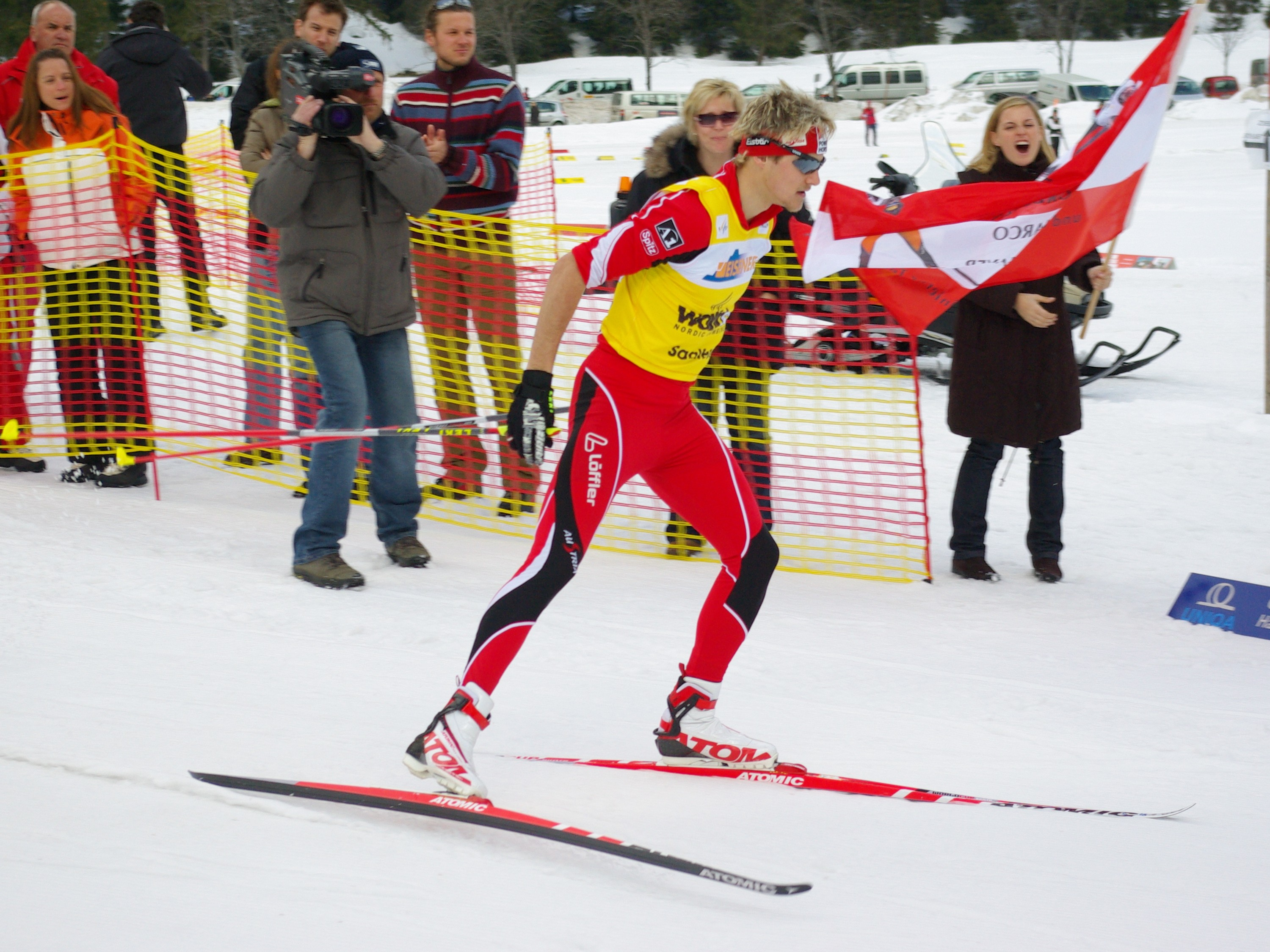
Marco Pichlmayer, Eisenerz 2008

Marco Pichlmayer (born July 27, 1987) is an Austrian Nordic combined skier who has competed since 2003. His best World Cup finish was third in a 4 x 5 km team event in Germany in January 2010 while his best individual finish was sixth in a normal hill Gundersen event in France in January 2009.

At the FIS Nordic World Ski Championships 2009 in Liberec, Pichlmayer finished 18th in the 10 km individual large hill event.
