= Alfred Rainer =

Austrian alpine skier (1987–2008)

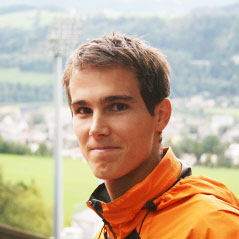

Personal information
- Born: September 22, 1987 Saalfelden, Austria
- Died: August 16, 2008 (aged 20) Innsbruck, Austria
- Height: 1.81 m (5 ft 11 in)

Skiing career
- Sport: Alpine skiing
- Club: SC Saalfelden
- Disciplines: Nordic Combined
- World Cup debut: 2007

World Cup
- Seasons: 2
- Wins: 0
- Podiums: 0
- Overall titles: 0
- Discipline titles: 0

Alfred Rainer (22 September 1987, in Saalfelden – 16 August 2008, in Innsbruck) was a World Cup competitor representing Austria in the Nordic combined event.

== Career ==
Rainer represented Austria in the 2006 Junior World Cup, securing a silver medal, and in 2007 at the same event Rainer won team gold and two individual bronze medals. He competed in his first World Cup at Zakopane finishing 11th. Rainer was ranked 34th in the Nordic Combined World Cup standings for the season ending March 2007, and 24th for the season ending March 2008.

== Death ==
On August 7, 2008, Rainer was paragliding over his home town of Maria Alm. He got into difficulty at approximately 20 meters (66 ft) and crashed. He was taken to hospital in Innsbruck, where he was found to have numerous broken bones. He subsequently was placed in a deep coma, and died on August 16, 2008 as a result of injuries sustained in the accident.

== Personal life ==
Rainer had previously been a soldier in the Austrian Army and a joiner. He spoke both German and English and enjoyed a range of hobbies, including football, movies, music, skiing and bicycling.
